= Ozzy Wiesblatt =

Canadian ice hockey player (born 2002)

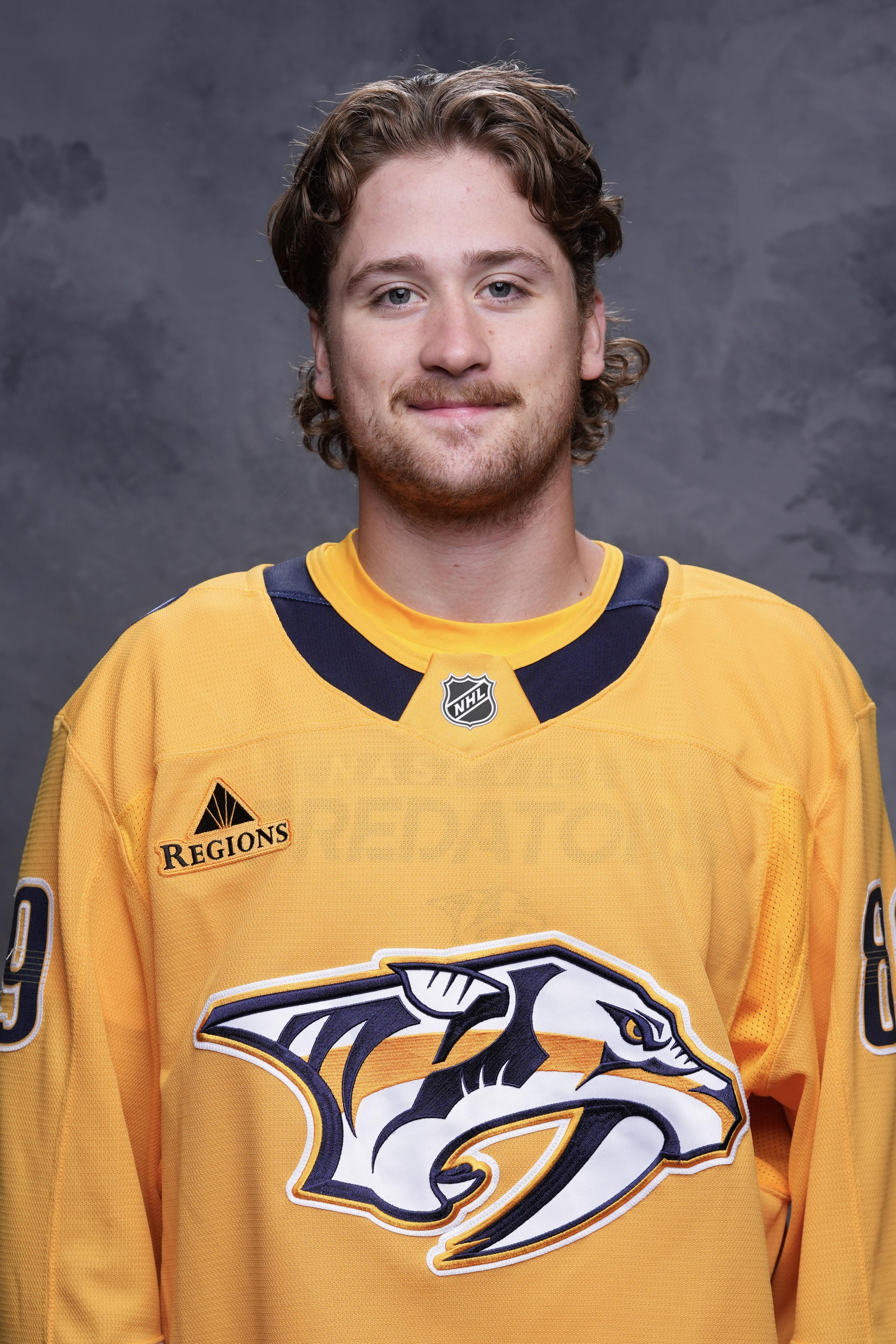
- Wiesblatt with the Nashville Predators in 2024
- Born: March 9, 2002 (age 24) Calgary, Alberta, Canada
- Height: 5 ft 10 in (178 cm)
- Weight: 183 lb (83 kg; 13 st 1 lb)
- Position: Right wing
- Shoots: Right
- NHL team (P) Cur. team: Nashville Predators; Milwaukee Admirals (AHL)
- NHL draft: 31st overall, 2020; San Jose Sharks
- Playing career: 2021–present

Ozzy Wiesblatt (born March 9, 2002) is a Canadian professional ice hockey player who is a right winger for the Milwaukee Admirals of the American Hockey League (AHL) while under contract to the Nashville Predators of the National Hockey League (NHL). He was drafted in the first round, 31st overall, by the San Jose Sharks in the 2020 NHL entry draft. He made his NHL debut with the Predators in January 2025.

== Early life ==
Wiesblatt was born to Kimberly White and Art Wiesblatt in Calgary, Alberta, Canada. He and his family lived in Kelowna in British Columbia, Canada, and in 2013 moved to Calgary.

== Playing career ==
Wiesblatt began his ice hockey career playing for the Calgary Bisons U15 AAA in the Alberta Major Bantam Hockey League before being drafted into the Western Hockey League (WHL). Prior to being drafted 25th overall, Wiesblatt recorded 38 goals and 35 assists in 32 games during the 2016–17 season. In spite of being drafted, he remained in the Alberta Midget Hockey League with the Calgary Bisons U18 team but was selected for Team Alberta at the 2017 WHL Cup. He made his WHL debut during the 2017–18 season, during which he recorded his first career WHL goal.

Wiesblatt officially joined the Raiders roster for the 2018–19 season where he recorded 39 points and helped lead the team to the Ed Chynoweth Cup. As a result, he shared the team's Rookie of the Year award with Kaiden Guhle. This caught the attention of San Jose Sharks' general manager and director of scouting, who referred to Wiesblatt as a center rather than a winger.

Wiesblatt entered his first year of draft eligibility ranking 19th overall North American skaters per the NHL Central Scouting Bureau's Midterm Rankings. Although the season was shortened due to the COVID-19 pandemic in North America, he placed second on the team in scoring with 70 points in 64 games. As a result, he was drafted in the first round, 31st overall, by the San Jose Sharks in the 2020 NHL entry draft. He signed his contract on October 16, 2020.

On March 18, 2024, Wiesblatt was reassigned by the Sharks from the San Jose Barracuda to the Milwaukee Admirals. He played out the remainder of the season with the Admirals, posting 6 points through 16 regular season games and adding 9 points in 15 playoff contests.

He was traded by the Sharks to the Nashville Predators in exchange for Egor Afanasyev on June 23, 2024.

On January 3, 2025, Wiesblatt made his NHL debut with the Nashville Predators.

== Personal life ==
Wiesblatt's parents are both deaf from birth, and as a result, he and his siblings all learned American sign language to communicate. All three of Wiesblatt's brothers have played hockey; Ocean has played professionally in the Federal Prospects Hockey League (FPHL), and Oasiz plays for the Milwaukee Admirals of the American Hockey League (AHL) alongside Ozzy. Their third brother, Orca, played in the FPHL and SPHL, and had signed a contract with the ECHL's Allen Americans before dying in a car accident in 2025. They also have a younger sister, Oceania. Wiesblatt is Jewish.

== Career statistics ==
=== Regular season and playoffs ===
			Regular season					Playoffs
Season	Team	League	GP	G	A	Pts	PIM	GP	G	A	Pts	PIM
2017–18	Calgary Buffaloes U18	AMHL	33	21	20	41	22	5	2	2	4	2
2017–18	Prince Albert Raiders	WHL	1	1	0	1	0	—	—	—	—	—
2018–19	Prince Albert Raiders	WHL	64	15	24	39	20	23	5	5	10	2
2019–20	Prince Albert Raiders	WHL	64	25	45	70	36	—	—	—	—	—
2020–21	San Jose Barracuda	AHL	6	2	1	3	0	—	—	—	—	—
2020–21	Prince Albert Raiders	WHL	23	7	21	28	29	—	—	—	—	—
2021–22	Prince Albert Raiders	WHL	43	10	31	41	55	3	0	1	1	0
2022–23	San Jose Barracuda	AHL	45	6	9	15	30	—	—	—	—	—
2023–24	San Jose Barracuda	AHL	34	3	8	11	33	—	—	—	—	—
2023–24	Milwaukee Admirals	AHL	16	1	5	6	22	15	2	7	9	12
2024–25	Milwaukee Admirals	AHL	64	15	25	40	96	10	2	6	8	6
2024–25	Nashville Predators	NHL	5	0	1	1	0	—	—	—	—	—
2025–26	Nashville Predators	NHL	40	1	4	5	38	—	—	—	—	—
NHL totals			45	1	5	6	38	—	—	—	—	—

=== International ===
Year	Team	Event	Result	GP	G	A	Pts	PIM
2018	Canada Black	U17	5th	5	1	2	3	6
2019	Canada	HG18	2nd place, silver medalist(s)	5	0	1	1	12
Junior totals				10	1	3	4	18

== See also ==
- List of select Jewish ice hockey players

Awards and achievements
Preceded by Ryan Merkley	San Jose Sharks first-round draft pick 2020	Succeeded by William Eklund
