= James Hamblin (ice hockey) =

Canadian ice hockey player (born 1999)

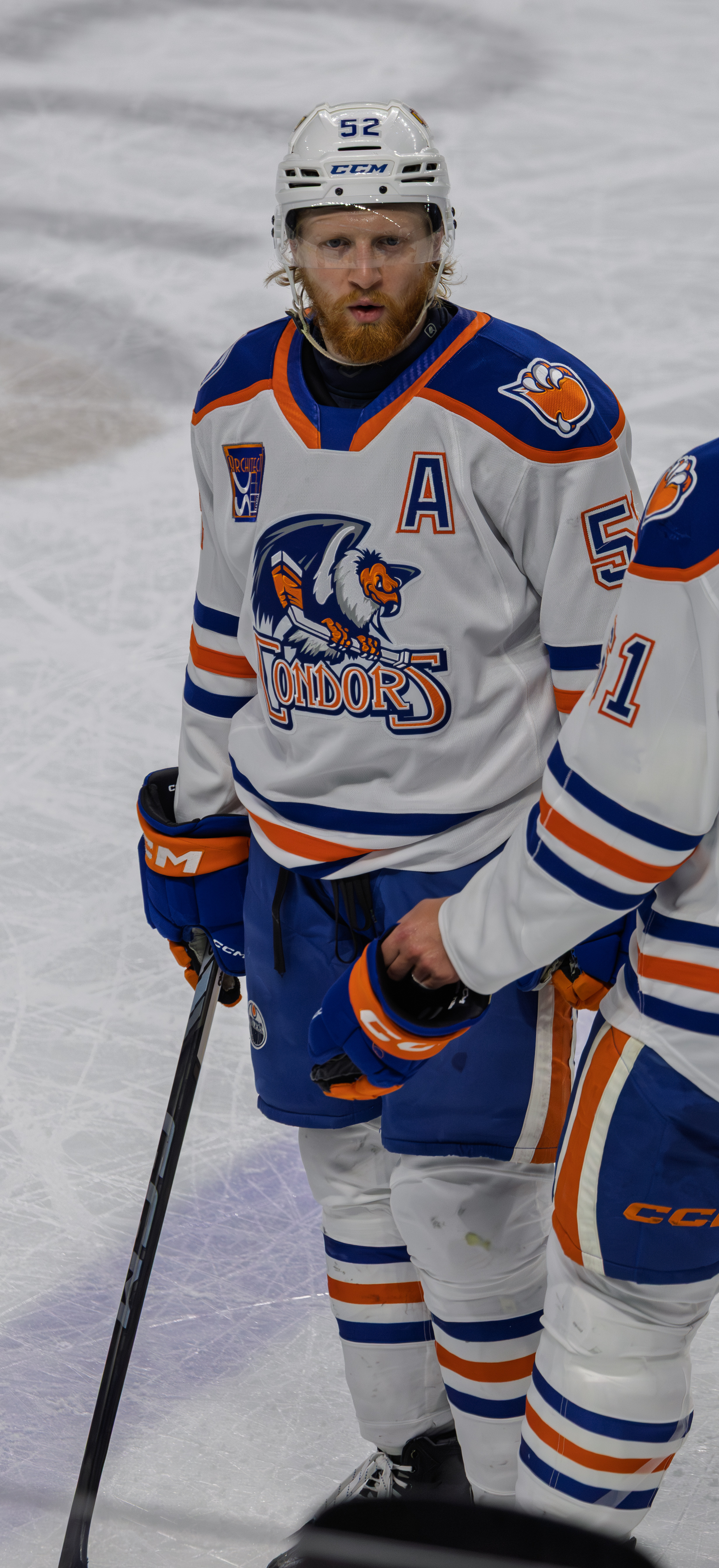
- Hamblin with the Bakersfield Condors in 2026
- Born: April 27, 1999 (age 27) Edmonton, Alberta, Canada
- Height: 5 ft 10 in (178 cm)
- Weight: 185 lb (84 kg; 13 st 3 lb)
- Position: Forward
- Shoots: Left
- NHL team (P) Cur. team Former teams: Anaheim Ducks; San Diego Gulls (AHL); Edmonton Oilers
- NHL draft: Undrafted
- Playing career: 2020–present

James Hamblin (born April 27, 1999) is a Canadian professional ice hockey player who is a forward for the San Diego Gulls of the American Hockey League (AHL) while under contract to the Anaheim Ducks of the National Hockey League (NHL).

== Playing career ==
Hamblin played four seasons for the Medicine Hat Tigers of the Western Hockey League (WHL), serving as the team's captain from 2017 through 2020.

On April 30, 2020, Hamblin signed a two-year contract with the Bakersfield Condors of the American Hockey League (AHL). He spent part of the 2020–21 season on loan with Östersunds IK of Hockeyettan due in part to the COVID-19 pandemic. Hamblin recorded 25 points in 23 games before returning to North America to play for the Condors. In 38 games for the club, he scored seven goals and eight assists for 15 points.

On March 2, 2022, Hamblin signed a one-year contract with the Condors' National Hockey League (NHL) affiliate, the Edmonton Oilers. On November 28, 2022, Hamblin skated in his first career NHL game in a 4–3 win over the Florida Panthers.

On November 18, 2023, Hamblin recorded his first career goal, scoring against Jonas Johansson in a 6–4 loss against the Tampa Bay Lightning. In his reaction to the goal, Hamblin pointed upwards and stated "that's for you, mom," dedicating the milestone to his late mother Gina, who died of cancer in September 2017.

After his sixth season within the Oilers organization, Hamblin left as a free agent and was signed to a two-year, two-way contract with the Anaheim Ducks on July 1, 2026.

== Personal life ==
Hamblin was born and raised in Edmonton, and played minor hockey at the South Side Athletic Club (SSAC), including one season of overlap on the SSAC Lions of the Alberta Major Bantam Hockey League with future Edmonton Oiler teammates Tyler Benson and Stuart Skinner, before being drafted into the Western Hockey League.

He is the son of Tim and Gina Hamblin. His father was a physical education teacher at Leduc Composite High School, just south of Edmonton. His mother, Gina, died of cancer in September 2017.

== Career statistics ==
=== Regular season and playoffs ===
			Regular season					Playoffs
Season	Team	League	GP	G	A	Pts	PIM	GP	G	A	Pts	PIM
2012–13	SSAC Lions	AMBHL	33	8	10	18	29	11	8	4	12	6
2013–14	SSAC Lions	AMBHL	31	32	30	62	50	8	6	6	12	12
2014–15	SSAC Athletics	AMHL	34	10	13	23	18	4	2	4	6	0
2015–16	Medicine Hat Tigers	WHL	54	2	1	3	14	—	—	—	—	—
2016–17	Medicine Hat Tigers	WHL	69	23	24	47	32	11	2	3	5	0
2017–18	Medicine Hat Tigers	WHL	70	21	43	64	30	—	—	—	—	—
2018–19	Medicine Hat Tigers	WHL	67	33	44	77	18	6	5	2	7	6
2019–20	Medicine Hat Tigers	WHL	63	36	56	92	35	—	—	—	—	—
2020–21	Östersunds IK	Div.1	22	12	13	25	10	—	—	—	—	—
2020–21	Bakersfield Condors	AHL	38	7	8	15	2	6	0	1	1	2
2021–22	Bakersfield Condors	AHL	64	21	14	35	28	5	1	1	2	0
2022–23	Bakersfield Condors	AHL	52	10	18	28	14	2	1	0	1	0
2022–23	Edmonton Oilers	NHL	10	0	0	0	2	—	—	—	—	—
2023–24	Bakersfield Condors	AHL	13	4	4	8	8	—	—	—	—	—
2023–24	Edmonton Oilers	NHL	31	2	1	3	0	—	—	—	—	—
2024–25	Bakersfield Condors	AHL	51	19	26	45	24	—	—	—	—	—
2025–26	Bakersfield Condors	AHL	64	27	14	41	32	3	1	0	1	0
NHL totals			41	2	1	3	2	—	—	—	—	—

=== International ===
Year	Team	Event	Result	GP	G	A	Pts	PIM
2015	Canada White	U17	1st place, gold medalist(s)	6	5	1	6	2
Junior totals				6	5	1	6	2

== Awards and honours ==
Award	Year	Ref
WHL
East First All-Star Team	2020	
