= Bryce Kindopp =

Canadian ice hockey player

- Born: June 14, 1999 (age 27) Lloydminster, Alberta, Canada
- Height: 6 ft 1 in (185 cm)
- Weight: 185 lb (84 kg; 13 st 3 lb)
- Position: Right wing
- Shoots: Right
- DEL2 team Former teams: Eisbären Regensburg; Anaheim Ducks
- NHL draft: Undrafted
- Playing career: 2021–present

Bryce Kindopp (born June 14, 1999) is a Canadian professional ice hockey forward under contract to Eisbären Regensburg of the DEL2.

== Playing career ==
Kindopp first played as a youth within his hometown of Lloydminster, Alberta, with the Blazers, Heat and Rage before appearing in the Alberta Junior Hockey League with the Lloydminster Bobcats. He was selected in the 2014 WHL Bantam Draft with the 49th overall pick by the Everett Silvertips and made his debut with the team during the following 2014–15 season.

Kindopp played six seasons within the Silvertips, captaining the club in his final major junior year in posting careers bests with 40 goals and 74 points through 63 games in the 2019-20 season. On March 4, 2020, Kindopp was signed as an undrafted free agent, to a three-year, entry-level contract with the Anaheim Ducks.

Kindopp made his professional debut in the pandemic delayed 2020–21 season in the ECHL with the Tulsa Oilers. After registering 4 points through 14 games, Kindopp was reassigned by the Ducks to primary affiliate, the San Diego Gulls of the AHL upon the commencement of the season. Through his rookie season, Kindopp showed offensive promise in contributing with 10 goals and 20 points through 39 regular season games.

In the following 2021–22 season, Kindopp remained with the Gulls before he received his first recall by the Ducks on January 5, 2022. He made his NHL debut that night, playing in a fourth-line role, in a 4–1 victory over the Philadelphia Flyers. He was returned to the Gulls in the AHL the following day.

On June 30, 2023, as a pending restricted free agent Kindopp was not tendered a qualifying offer by the Ducks and was released as a free agent. Opting to continue his professional career in the AHL, Kindopp secured a one-year contract with the Rockford IceHogs, the primary affiliate to the Chicago Blackhawks on August 21, 2023.

At the conclusion of his contract with the IceHogs, Kindopp remained an un-signed free agent over the summer. On September 30, 2024, Kindopp was revealed to have signed a one-year AHL contract with the Bakersfield Condors, affiliate to the Edmonton Oilers, for the 2024–25 season. Kindopp was reassigned to begin the season in the ECHL however did not report and was suspended for the remainder of the season.

In a return to professional hockey in the following season, Kindopp moved abroad to sign a one-year contract with German second-tier club, Eisbären Regensburg of the DEL2, on May 30, 2025.

== Career statistics ==
			Regular season					Playoffs
Season	Team	League	GP	G	A	Pts	PIM	GP	G	A	Pts	PIM
2012–13	Lloydminster Heat	AMBHL	2	0	0	0	0	—	—	—	—	—
2013–14	Lloydminster Heat	AMBHL	33	26	37	63	58	11	16	9	25	10
2014–15	Lloyminster Bobcats AAA	AMHL	32	12	17	29	48	8	2	1	3	6
2014–15	Lloydminster Bobcats	AJHL	1	0	0	0	0	—	—	—	—	—
2014–15	Everett Silvertips	WHL	3	0	0	0	0	—	—	—	—	—
2015–16	Lloydminster Bobcats AAA	AMHL	32	14	22	36	50	10	6	5	11	0
2015–16	Lloydminster Bobcats	AJHL	2	0	0	0	0	—	—	—	—	—
2015–16	Everett Silvertips	WHL	1	0	0	0	0	—	—	—	—	—
2016–17	Everett Silvertips	WHL	60	7	7	14	8	10	1	0	1	0
2017–18	Everett Silvertips	WHL	72	24	12	36	10	22	2	3	5	4
2018–19	Everett Silvertips	WHL	67	39	34	73	26	10	5	6	11	6
2019–20	Everett Silvertips	WHL	63	40	34	74	42	—	—	—	—	—
2020–21	Tulsa Oilers	ECHL	14	2	2	4	2	—	—	—	—	—
2020–21	San Diego Gulls	AHL	39	10	10	20	4	3	0	0	0	2
2021–22	San Diego Gulls	AHL	67	12	17	29	35	2	0	0	0	0
2021–22	Anaheim Ducks	NHL	1	0	0	0	0	—	—	—	—	—
2022–23	San Diego Gulls	AHL	65	6	3	9	14	—	—	—	—	—
2023–24	Rockford IceHogs	AHL	39	4	3	7	12	—	—	—	—	—
NHL totals			1	0	0	0	0	—	—	—	—	—

== Awards and honours ==
Award	Year
AMHL
Second all-star team	2016
WHL
West Second All-Star Team	2020
