= Trey Fix-Wolansky =

Canadian ice hockey player (born 1999)

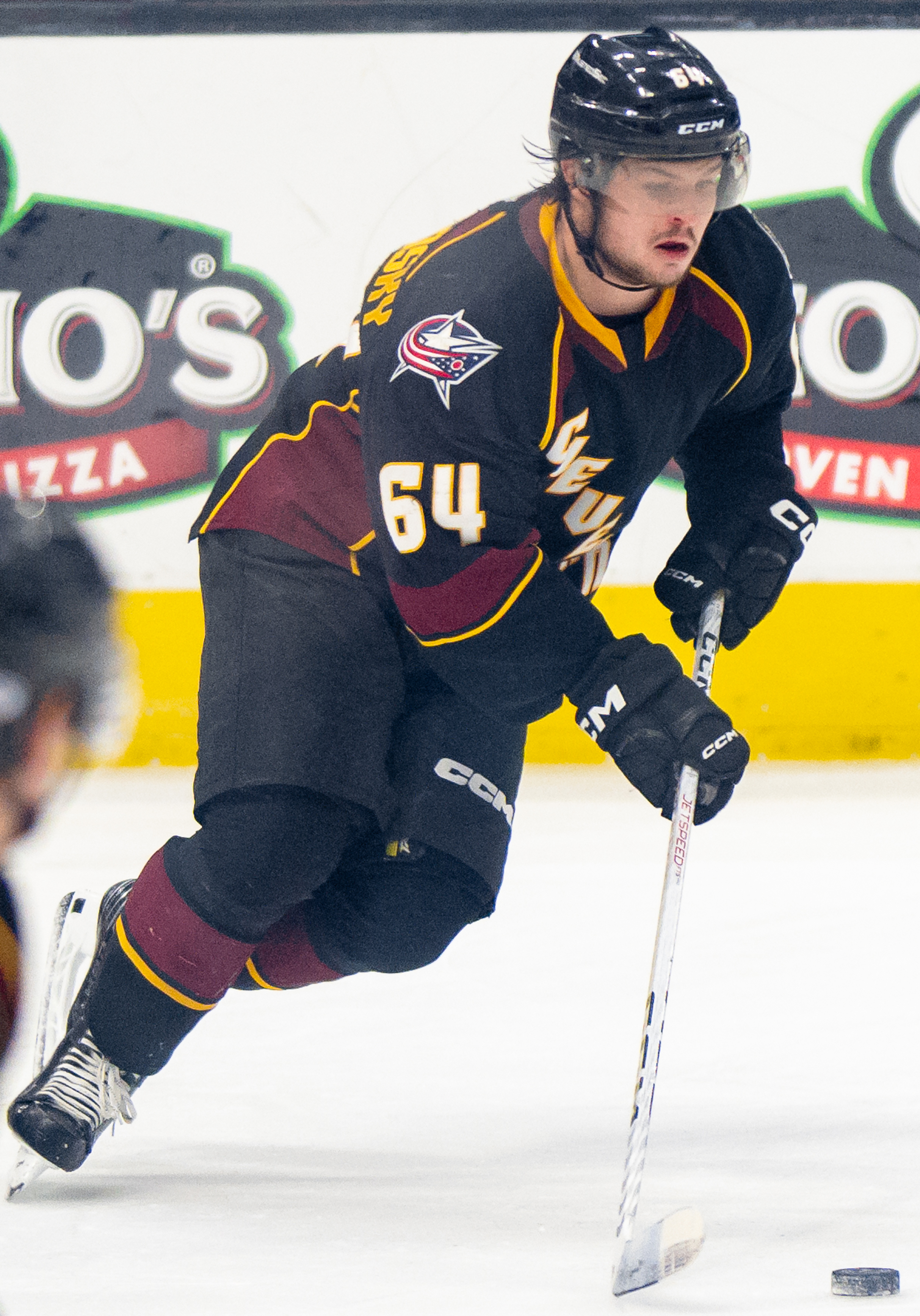
- Fix-Wolansky with the Cleveland Monsters in 2023
- Born: May 26, 1999 (age 27) Edmonton, Alberta, Canada
- Height: 5 ft 7 in (170 cm)
- Weight: 179 lb (81 kg; 12 st 11 lb)
- Position: Right wing
- Shoots: Right
- NHL team (P) Cur. team Former teams: Vancouver Canucks; Abbotsford Canucks (AHL); Columbus Blue Jackets
- NHL draft: 204th overall, 2018; Columbus Blue Jackets
- Playing career: 2019–present

Trey Kieren Fix-Wolansky (born May 26, 1999) is a Canadian professional ice hockey forward for the Abbotsford Canucks of the American Hockey League (AHL) while under contract to the Vancouver Canucks of the National Hockey League (NHL). Fix-Wolansky was selected 204th overall in the seventh round of the 2018 NHL entry draft by the Columbus Blue Jackets, with whom he played parts of three seasons.

== Early life ==
Fix-Wolansky was born on May 26, 1999, in Edmonton, Alberta, to parents Cheryn and Dallas.

== Playing career ==
Growing up in Edmonton, Fix-Wolansky played for the CAC Canadians U15 and U18 AAA team in the Alberta Major Bantam Hockey League. In 2014, he was selected for the 2014 AMBHL All-Star Game. He finished his AMBHL career in 2015 and joined the Spruce Grove Saints of the Alberta Junior Hockey League. At 16 years old, Fix Wolansky tallied 16 goals 15 assists for 31 points and was subsequently selected for the AJHL North Division All Rookie Team.

=== Major junior ===
Fix-Wolansky was originally drafted by the Prince Albert Raiders of the Western Hockey League (WHL) but his playing rights were sent to the Edmonton Oil Kings in exchange for a fourth round pick at the 2018 WHL bantam draft. Upon joining the Oil Kings, Fix-Wolansky immediately signed a WHL Standard Player Agreement. On September 24, 2016, the first WHL game at Rogers Place, Fix-Wolansky scored the first-ever goal at the arena and was named the game’s first star. In his first five games as an Oil King, Fix-Wolansky recorded two goals and three assists. As a result of his play, Fix-Wolansky was named to the NHL Central Scouting Bureau's November ‘Players to Watch’ list leading up to the 2017 NHL entry draft. In February 2017, Fix-Wolansky recorded his first career hat trick in an eventual 7–4 loss against the Medicine Hat Tigers. Following the hat-trick, Fix-Wolansky recorded his 21st goal of the year, snapping an Oil Kings franchise record for goals by a rookie. Fix-Wolansky finished the 2016–17 season as the team's second-leading scorer, with 25 goals and 54 points in 70 games, and was named the Oil Kings Rookie of the Year. As such, he earned an invite to participate in the Edmonton Oilers rookie camp to compete in the Young Stars Tournament. While playing for the Oil Kings, Fix-Wolansky attended St. Francis Xavier High School.

Fix-Wolansky returned to the Oil Kings for his sophomore season where he opened the season with three assists against the Red Deer Rebels. He began the year on an eight-game point streak and continued to pick up on scoring after the Christmas break. He finished the season with 32 goals and 57 assists for 89 points and 81 penalty minutes. In June, Fix-Wolansky was drafted 204th overall by the Columbus Blue Jackets in the 2018 NHL entry draft.

Prior to the start of the 2018–19 season, Fix-Wolansky was named the 12th captain in modern franchise history. He missed the beginning of Oil Kings' pre-season while attending the Blue Jackets training camp. Upon returning to the team, Fix-Wolansky tallied 45 points through the first 22 games of the season. In December, Fix-Wolansky tallied his 75th career goal and 200th career point. As a result of his strong play, Fix-Wolansky was invite to be a member of Team WHL for both games during the CIBC Canada Russia Series. He signed an entry-level contract with the Blue Jackets on March 15, 2019, and finished the regular season with a career-high 37 goals and 65 assists for 102 points through 65 games. On March 20, Fix-Wolansky was named to WHL’s Eastern Conference First All-Star Team and was recognized as the WHL’s Eastern Conference Player of the Year.

=== Professional ===
Following his third season with the Oil Kings, Fix-Wolansky made his professional ice hockey debut with the Cleveland Monsters of the American Hockey League (AHL) during their post-season run. He played three games with the Monsters, recording one goal and one assist, before they were eliminated by the Toronto Marlies. He began the 2019–20 season in the AHL, and played in four games before suffering a groin injury that lingered for nearly two months. Upon returning to the team, he recorded a goal and five assists as the Monsters entered into first place in the Central Division.

When the AHL season was postponed due to the COVID-19 pandemic, he participated in 4-on-4 summer skates around his native Edmonton with NHL, AHL, and college players. Upon returning to the ice, Fix-Wolansky recorded four goals and three assists to tie for the Monsters lead with seven points in five games. However, his success was shortlived as he suffered a leg injury during a game against the Grand Rapids Griffins on March 20, 2021, which required surgery. On February 8, 2022, Fix-Wolansky scored his first NHL goal during his NHL debut for the Blue Jackets in a game against the Washington Capitals.

As a restricted free agent, Fix-Wolansky was re-signed to a one-year, two-way contract extension with the Blue Jackets on July 23, 2022.

Following the expiration of his contract with Columbus, Fix-Wolansky signed a one-year, two-way contract worth $775,000 with the New York Rangers on July 3, 2025. Fix-Wolansky departed the Blue Jackets organization as the Cleveland Monsters' all-time leader in goals, assists, and points.

After a lone season within the Rangers organization, Fix-Wolansky left to sign as a free agent to a one-year, two-way contract with the Vancouver Canucks for the 2026–27 season on July 1, 2026.

== Career statistics ==
			Regular season					Playoffs
Season	Team	League	GP	G	A	Pts	PIM	GP	G	A	Pts	PIM
2014–15	CAC Canadians AAA	AMHL	32	9	16	25	28	13	6	4	10	23
2015–16	Spruce Grove Saints	AJHL	51	15	16	31	74	14	5	9	14	8
2016–17	Edmonton Oil Kings	WHL	70	24	30	54	69	—	—	—	—	—
2017–18	Edmonton Oil Kings	WHL	71	32	57	89	81	—	—	—	—	—
2018–19	Edmonton Oil Kings	WHL	65	37	65	102	52	16	6	8	14	14
2018–19	Cleveland Monsters	AHL	—	—	—	—	—	3	1	1	2	0
2019–20	Cleveland Monsters	AHL	43	12	14	26	32	—	—	—	—	—
2020–21	Cleveland Monsters	AHL	9	4	5	9	2	—	—	—	—	—
2021–22	Cleveland Monsters	AHL	53	15	18	33	59	—	—	—	—	—
2021–22	Columbus Blue Jackets	NHL	6	1	1	2	0	—	—	—	—	—
2022–23	Cleveland Monsters	AHL	61	29	42	71	40	—	—	—	—	—
2022–23	Columbus Blue Jackets	NHL	9	1	0	1	0	—	—	—	—	—
2023–24	Cleveland Monsters	AHL	58	26	34	60	48	14	3	5	8	6
2023–24	Columbus Blue Jackets	NHL	11	2	1	3	2	—	—	—	—	—
2024–25	Cleveland Monsters	AHL	65	26	34	60	73	6	0	3	3	8
2025–26	Hartford Wolf Pack	AHL	72	31	24	55	121	—	—	—	—	—
NHL totals			26	4	2	6	2	—	—	—	—	—

== Awards and honours ==
Award	Year
AJHL
North All-Rookie Team	2016
WHL
East First All-Star Team	2019
