= 2018–19 WHL season =

53rd season of the Western Hockey League

- League: Western Hockey League
- Sport: Ice hockey
- Duration: Regular season September 21, 2018 – March 19, 2019; Playoffs; March 22, 2019 – May 13, 2019
- Teams: 22
- TV partner(s): CW 32, JOEtv, Rogers Sportsnet

Regular season
- Scotty Munro Memorial Trophy: Prince Albert Raiders (2)
- Season MVP: Joachim Blichfeld (Portland Winterhawks)
- Top scorer: Joachim Blichfeld (Portland Winterhawks)

Playoffs
- Playoffs MVP: Ian Scott (Raiders)
- Finals champions: Prince Albert Raiders (2)
- Runners-up: Vancouver Giants

WHL seasons
- 2017–18 2019–20

2018–19 CHL seasons
- League: Canadian Hockey League
- Sport: Ice hockey
- Duration: OHL; September 2018 – March 2019; QMJHL; September 2018 – March 2019; WHL; September 2018 – March 2019
- Teams: 60
- TV partner(s): TVA Sports, Rogers Sportsnet/Rogers TV, Shaw TV
- Season MVP: Alexis Lafrenière (Rimouski Océanic) (QMJHL)
- Top scorer: Jason Robertson (Kingston/Niagara) (OHL)

Memorial Cup
- Finals champions: Rouyn-Noranda Huskies (QMJHL) (1st title)
- Runners-up: Halifax Mooseheads (QMJHL)

The 2018–19 WHL season was the 53rd season of the Western Hockey League (WHL). The regular season began on September 21, 2018, and ended on March 17, 2019. The regular season schedule was shortened from 72 to 68 games; the league had used a 72-game schedule since the 1975–76 season. The playoffs began on March 22, 2019, and ended on May 13; the winning team, the Prince Albert Raiders, were awarded the Ed Chynoweth Cup and a berth in the 2019 Memorial Cup, held at the Scotiabank Centre in Halifax, Nova Scotia, from May 17 to 26.

== Standings ==
Map of WHL, 2011–12 to 2018–19
East Division
Central Division
BC Division
US Division

Updated to game(s) played on March 17.

East division: Top 3
| Pos | Team | Pld | W | L | OTL | SOL | GF | GA | Pts |
|---|---|---|---|---|---|---|---|---|---|
| 1 | x, y, z – Prince Albert Raiders | 68 | 54 | 10 | 2 | 2 | 307 | 156 | 112 |
| 2 | x – Saskatoon Blades | 68 | 45 | 15 | 8 | 0 | 259 | 190 | 98 |
| 3 | x – Moose Jaw Warriors | 68 | 40 | 20 | 6 | 2 | 234 | 192 | 88 |

x – clinched playoff berth; y – clinched division title; z – clinched conference title

Central division: Top 3
| Pos | Team | Pld | W | L | OTL | SOL | GF | GA | Pts |
|---|---|---|---|---|---|---|---|---|---|
| 1 | x, y – Edmonton Oil Kings | 68 | 42 | 18 | 4 | 4 | 259 | 196 | 92 |
| 2 | x – Lethbridge Hurricanes | 68 | 40 | 18 | 5 | 5 | 268 | 234 | 90 |
| 3 | x – Calgary Hitmen | 68 | 36 | 26 | 5 | 1 | 255 | 240 | 78 |

x – clinched playoff berth; y – clinched division title

Eastern Conference wild card: Top 2 qualify for playoffs
| Pos | Div | Team | Pld | W | L | OTL | SOL | GF | GA | Pts |
|---|---|---|---|---|---|---|---|---|---|---|
| 1 | Cen. | x – Medicine Hat Tigers | 68 | 35 | 27 | 4 | 2 | 217 | 222 | 76 |
| 2 | Cen. | x – Red Deer Rebels | 68 | 33 | 29 | 4 | 2 | 223 | 225 | 72 |
| 3 | East | Brandon Wheat Kings | 68 | 31 | 29 | 4 | 4 | 230 | 243 | 70 |
| 4 | East | Regina Pats | 68 | 19 | 45 | 1 | 3 | 173 | 271 | 42 |
| 5 | Cen. | Kootenay Ice | 68 | 13 | 45 | 7 | 3 | 181 | 324 | 36 |
| 6 | East | Swift Current Broncos | 68 | 11 | 51 | 4 | 2 | 135 | 301 | 28 |

x – clinched playoff berth

U.S. division: Top 3
| Pos | Team | Pld | W | L | OTL | SOL | GF | GA | Pts |
|---|---|---|---|---|---|---|---|---|---|
| 1 | x, y – Everett Silvertips | 68 | 47 | 16 | 2 | 3 | 223 | 130 | 99 |
| 2 | x – Spokane Chiefs | 68 | 40 | 21 | 2 | 5 | 267 | 222 | 87 |
| 3 | x – Portland Winterhawks | 68 | 40 | 22 | 3 | 3 | 258 | 210 | 86 |

x – clinched playoff berth; y – clinched division title

B.C. division: Top 3
| Pos | Team | Pld | W | L | OTL | SOL | GF | GA | Pts |
|---|---|---|---|---|---|---|---|---|---|
| 1 | x, y – Vancouver Giants | 68 | 48 | 15 | 3 | 2 | 228 | 162 | 101 |
| 2 | x – Victoria Royals | 68 | 34 | 30 | 2 | 2 | 199 | 227 | 72 |
| 3 | x – Kamloops Blazers | 68 | 28 | 32 | 6 | 2 | 196 | 212 | 64 |

x – clinched playoff berth; y – clinched division title

Western Conference wild card: Top 2 qualify for playoffs
| Pos | Div | Team | Pld | W | L | OTL | SOL | GF | GA | Pts |
|---|---|---|---|---|---|---|---|---|---|---|
| 1 | U.S. | x – Tri-City Americans | 68 | 34 | 28 | 5 | 1 | 214 | 230 | 74 |
| 2 | U.S. | x – Seattle Thunderbirds | 68 | 31 | 29 | 6 | 2 | 231 | 245 | 70 |
| 3 | B.C. | Kelowna Rockets | 68 | 28 | 32 | 6 | 2 | 169 | 209 | 64 |
| 4 | B.C. | Prince George Cougars | 68 | 19 | 41 | 5 | 3 | 152 | 237 | 46 |

x – clinched playoff berth

=== Western Conference tiebreaker ===
==== Kamloops Blazers vs. Kelowna Rockets ====
| March 19 | Kelowna Rockets | 1 – 5 | Kamloops Blazers | Sandman Centre | Recap |
| No scoring | | First period | No scoring |
| Mark Liwiski (1) - 7:56 | | Second period | 4:11 - pp - Kyrell Sopotyk (1) |
| No scoring | | Third period | 6:10 - Kobe Mohr (1); 8:44 - sh - Connor Zary (1); 10:12 - sh - Brodi Stuart (1); 18:29 - en - Jermaine Loewen (1) |
| Roman Basran (30 saves / 34 shots); James Porter (5 saves / 5 shots) | | Goalie stats | Dylan Garand (27 saves / 28 shots) |

| Kamloops claims final playoff spot |

== Statistics ==
=== Scoring leaders ===
Players are listed by points, then goals.

Note: GP = Games played; G = Goals; A = Assists; Pts. = Points; PIM = Penalty minutes

| Player | Team | GP | G | A | Pts | PIM |
|---|---|---|---|---|---|---|
| Joachim Blichfeld | Portland Winterhawks | 68 | 53 | 61 | 114 | 70 |
| Tristin Langan | Moose Jaw Warriors | 67 | 53 | 60 | 113 | 89 |
| Justin Almeida | Moose Jaw Warriors | 64 | 33 | 78 | 111 | 14 |
| Brandon Hagel | Red Deer Rebels | 66 | 41 | 61 | 102 | 80 |
| Trey Fix-Wolansky | Edmonton Oil Kings | 65 | 37 | 65 | 102 | 52 |
| Stelio Mattheos | Brandon Wheat Kings | 65 | 44 | 52 | 96 | 77 |
| Nick Henry | Regina/Lethbridge | 69 | 29 | 65 | 94 | 66 |
| Brett Leason | Prince Albert Raiders | 55 | 36 | 53 | 89 | 28 |
| Noah Gregor | Prince Albert Raiders | 63 | 43 | 45 | 88 | 38 |
| Parker AuCoin | Tri-City Americans | 68 | 42 | 42 | 84 | 21 |

=== Leading goaltenders ===
These are the goaltenders that lead the league in GAA that have played at least 1500 minutes.

Note: GP = Games played; Mins = Minutes played; W = Wins; L = Losses; OTL = Overtime losses; SOL = Shootout losses; SO = Shutouts; GAA = Goals against average; Sv% = Save percentage

| Player | Team | GP | Mins | W | L | OTL | SOL | SO | GAA | Sv% |
|---|---|---|---|---|---|---|---|---|---|---|
| Dustin Wolf | Everett Silvertips | 61 | 3615 | 41 | 15 | 2 | 2 | 7 | 1.69 | .936 |
| Ian Scott | Prince Albert Raiders | 49 | 2923 | 38 | 8 | 1 | 2 | 8 | 1.83 | .932 |
| Trent Miner | Vancouver Giants | 32 | 1876 | 24 | 5 | 1 | 1 | 3 | 1.98 | .924 |
| David Tendeck | Vancouver Giants | 38 | 2225 | 24 | 10 | 2 | 1 | 4 | 2.48 | .911 |
| Dylan Myskiw | Edmonton Oil Kings | 45 | 2629 | 28 | 11 | 2 | 3 | 1 | 2.53 | .914 |

== 2019 WHL playoffs ==
Conference Quarter-finals | Conference Semi-finals
E1 | Prince Albert | 4
W2 | Red Deer | 0
E1 | Prince Albert | 4
E2 | Saskatoon | 2
E2 | Saskatoon | 4
E3 | Moose Jaw | 0
Eastern Conference
C1 | Edmonton | 4
W1 | Medicine Hat | 2
C1 | Edmonton | 4
C3 | Calgary | 0
C2 | Lethbridge | 3
C3 | Calgary | 4
U1 | Everett | 4
W1 | Tri-City | 1
U1 | Everett | 1
U2 | Spokane | 4
U2 | Spokane | 4
U3 | Portland | 1
Western Conference
B1 | Vancouver | 4
W2 | Seattle | 2
B1 | Vancouver | 4
B2 | Victoria | 0
B2 | Victoria | 4
B3 | Kamloops | 2

Conference Finals
E1 | Prince Albert | 4
C1 | Edmonton | 2
U2 | Spokane | 1
B1 | Vancouver | 4

WHL Championship
E1 | Prince Albert | 4
B1 | Vancouver | 3

== Conference Quarter-finals ==
=== Eastern Conference ===
==== (E1) Prince Albert Raiders vs. (W2) Red Deer Rebels ====
| March 22 | Red Deer Rebels | 0 – 3 | Prince Albert Raiders | Art Hauser Centre | Recap |
| No scoring | | First period | 19:28 - Dante Hannoun (1) |
| No scoring | | Second period | 8:49 - Ozzy Wiesblatt (1); 16:53 - Sean Montgomery (1) |
| No scoring | | Third period | No scoring |
| Ethan Anders (25 saves / 28 shots) | | Goalie stats | Ian Scott (21 saves / 21 shots) |

| March 23 | Red Deer Rebels | 4 – 6 | Prince Albert Raiders | Art Hauser Centre | Recap |
| Chris Douglas (1) - pp - 14:55 | | First period | 6:08 - Aliaksei Protas (1); 8:32 - pp - Sergei Sapego (1); 16:19 - Sergei Sapego (2) |
| Brandon Hagel (1) - pp - 8:00; Brandon Hagel (2) - 9:00 | | Second period | 11:14 - Brayden Pachal (1) |
| Brandon Hagel (3) - pp - 10:42 | | Third period | 2:08 - Aliaksei Protas (2); 7:47 - Ozzy Wiesblatt (2) |
| Ethan Anders (25 saves / 31 shots) | | Goalie stats | Ian Scott (19 saves / 23 shots) |

| March 26 | Prince Albert Raiders | 4 – 2 | Red Deer Rebels | ENMAX Centrium | Recap |
| Noah Gregor (1) - sh - 1:09; Dante Hannoun (2) - sh - 13:22 | | First period | No scoring |
| No scoring | | Second period | 4:37 - Brandon Hagel (4) |
| Noah Gregor (2) - 16:46; Parker Kelly (1) - en - 19:41 | | Third period | 18:58 - Reese Johnson (1) |
| Ian Scott (14 saves / 16 shots) | | Goalie stats | Ethan Anders (38 saves / 41 shots) |

| March 27 | Prince Albert Raiders | 4 – 1 | Red Deer Rebels | ENMAX Centrium | Recap |
| No scoring | | First period | 19:50 - Jeff de Wit (1) |
| Ozzy Wiesblatt (3) - 9:08 | | Second period | No scoring |
| Brett Leason (1) - 0:58; Brett Leason (2) - pp - 11:27; Cole Fonstad (1) - en - 16:26 | | Third period | No scoring |
| Ian Scott (21 saves / 22 shots) | | Goalie stats | Ethan Anders (31 saves / 34 shots) |

| Prince Albert wins series 4 – 0 |

==== (E2) Saskatoon Blades vs. (E3) Moose Jaw Warriors ====
| March 22 | Moose Jaw Warriors | 2 – 3 | OT | Saskatoon Blades | SaskTel Centre | Recap |
| No scoring | | First period | | No scoring |
| Kaeden Taphorn (1) - 3:03; Eric Alarie (1) - 4:34 | | Second period | | 7:21 - pp - Max Gerlach (1) |
| No scoring | | Third period | | 11:48 - Riley McKay (1) |
| No scoring | | First overtime period | | 3:23 - Chase Wouters (1) |
| Brodan Salmond (35 saves / 38 shots) | | Goalie stats | | Nolan Maier (21 saves / 23 shots) |

| March 23 | Moose Jaw Warriors | 1 – 3 | Saskatoon Blades | SaskTel Centre | Recap |
| No scoring | | First period | No scoring |
| No scoring | | Second period | 11:55 - Max Gerlach (2) |
| Carson Denomie (1) - pp - 5:07 | | Third period | 10:05 - Max Gerlach (3); 19:24 - en - Kirby Dach (1) |
| Adam Evanoff (27 saves / 29 shots) | | Goalie stats | Nolan Maier (21 saves / 22 shots) |

| March 26 | Saskatoon Blades | 3 – 2 | Moose Jaw Warriors | Mosaic Place | Recap |
| Kyle Crnkovic (1) - 18:03 | | First period | No scoring |
| Kirby Dach (2) - 17:15 | | Second period | 11:29 - Keenan Taphorn (1) |
| Max Gerlach (4) - pp - 15:39 | | Third period | 6:27 - Carson Denomie (2) |
| Nolan Maier (22 saves / 24 shots) | | Goalie stats | Adam Evanoff (37 saves / 40 shots) |

| March 27 | Saskatoon Blades | 4 – 3 | OT | Moose Jaw Warriors | Mosaic Place | Recap |
| Max Gerlach (5) - 7:37 | | First period | | 18:03 - Luke Ormsby (1) |
| Tristen Robins (1) - 9:40 | | Second period | | 2:06 - Matthew Benson (1) |
| Kirby Dach (3) - sh - 15:35 | | Third period | | 17:43 - sh - Tristin Langan (1) |
| Kristian Marthinsen (1) - 4:36 | | First overtime period | | No scoring |
| Nolan Maier (23 saves / 26 shots) | | Goalie stats | | Adam Evanoff (44 saves / 48 shots) |

| Saskatoon wins series 4 – 0 |

==== (C1) Edmonton Oil Kings vs. (W1) Medicine Hat Tigers ====
| March 23 | Medicine Hat Tigers | 2 – 1 | Edmonton Oil Kings | Rogers Place | Recap |
| No scoring | | First period | No scoring |
| James Hamblin (1) - sh - 4:18; Hayden Ostir (1) - 13:20 | | Second period | No scoring |
| No scoring | | Third period | 17:58 - Josh Williams (1) |
| Mads Søgaard (49 saves / 50 shots) | | Goalie stats | Dylan Myskiw (25 saves / 27 shots) |

| March 24 | Medicine Hat Tigers | 3 – 4 | Edmonton Oil Kings | Rogers Place | Recap |
| Linus Nassen (1) - pp - 11:36; Linus Nassen (2) - 14:39 | | First period | 2:26 - Liam Keeler (1) |
| Brett Kemp (1) - pp - 18:42 | | Second period | 12:49 - pp - Vince Loschiavo (1) |
| No scoring | | Third period | 7:25 - Carter Souch (1); 17:04 - Quinn Benjafield (1) |
| Mads Søgaard (37 saves / 41 shots) | | Goalie stats | Dylan Myskiw (18 saves / 21 shots) |

| March 26 | Edmonton Oil Kings | 0 – 5 | Medicine Hat Tigers | Canalta Centre | Recap |
| No scoring | | First period | 15:09 - Cole Sillinger (1) |
| No scoring | | Second period | 9:24 - sh - James Hamblin (2); 12:53 - Elijah Brown (1) |
| No scoring | | Third period | 1:55 - Ryan Chyzowski (1); 10:19 - Hayden Ostir (2) |
| Dylan Myskiw (19 saves / 23 shots); Todd Scott (10 saves / 11 shots) | | Goalie stats | Mads Søgaard (32 saves / 32 shots) |

| March 27 | Edmonton Oil Kings | 5 – 1 | Medicine Hat Tigers | Canalta Centre | Recap |
| No scoring | | First period | No scoring |
| Quinn Benjafield (2) - pp - 15:32; Andrew Fyten (1) - 16:45; Vince Loschiavo (2) - 17:28 | | Second period | 9:34 - pp - Ryan Jevne (1) |
| Vince Loschiavo (3) - pp - 7:31; Matthew Robertson (1) - 11:19 | | Third period | No scoring |
| Todd Scott (14 saves / 15 shots) | | Goalie stats | Mads Søgaard (31 saves / 36 shots) |

| March 29 | Medicine Hat Tigers | 4 – 5 | Edmonton Oil Kings | Rogers Place | Recap |
| Linus Nassen (3) - pp - 0:39 | | First period | 0:16 - Andrei Pavlenko (1); 5:08 - Andrew Fyten (2); 7:57 - Trey Fix-Wolansky (1); 18:49 - Scott Atkinson (1) |
| Ryan Chyzowski (2) - 0:41 | | Second period | 12:31 - Trey Fix-Wolansky (2) |
| James Hamblin (3) - 8:12; Ryan Chyzowski (3) - 11:22 | | Third period | No scoring |
| Mads Søgaard (34 saves / 39 shots) | | Goalie stats | Todd Scott (27 saves / 31 shots) |

| March 31 | Edmonton Oil Kings | 4 – 3 | OT | Medicine Hat Tigers | Canalta Centre | Recap |
| Trey Fix-Wolansky (3) - sh - 4:09 | | First period | | 5:54 - Corson Hopwo (1) |
| Wyatt McLeod (1) - 8:06 | | Second period | | 7:14 - James Hamblin (4); 7:41 - pp - James Hamblin (5) |
| Conner McDonald (1) - 0:31 | | Third period | | No scoring |
| Vince Loschiavo (4) - 2:43 | | First overtime period | | No scoring |
| Todd Scott (26 saves / 29 shots) | | Goalie stats | | Mads Søgaard (32 saves / 36 shots) |

| Edmonton wins series 4 – 2 |

==== (C2) Lethbridge Hurricanes vs. (C3) Calgary Hitmen ====
| March 22 | Calgary Hitmen | 2 – 3 | OT | Lethbridge Hurricanes | ENMAX Centre | Recap |
| Mark Kastelic (1) - 14:36 | | First period | | No scoring |
| Devan Klassen (1) - 3:33 | | Second period | | 1:35 - Nick Henry (1); 11:24 - Dylan Cozens (1) |
| No scoring | | Third period | | No scoring |
| No scoring | | First overtime period | | 5:43 - Calen Addison (1) |
| Jack McNaughton (30 saves / 33 shots) | | Goalie stats | | Carl Tetachuk (31 saves / 33 shots) |

| March 23 | Calgary Hitmen | 1 – 4 | Lethbridge Hurricanes | ENMAX Centre | Recap |
| No scoring | | First period | 0:25 - Nick Henry (2); 12:16 - pp - Jake Leschyshyn (1); 19:13 - Jake Leschyshyn (2) |
| No scoring | | Second period | No scoring |
| Dakota Krebs (1) - 11:28 | | Third period | 8:57 - pp - Jake Leschyshyn (3) |
| Jack McNaughton (28 saves / 32 shots) | | Goalie stats | Carl Tetachuk (32 saves / 33 shots) |

| March 26 | Lethbridge Hurricanes | 3 – 5 | Calgary Hitmen | Scotiabank Saddledome | Recap |
| No scoring | | First period | 3:24 - Ryder Korczak (1); 4:43 - Carson Focht (1) |
| Dylan Cozens (2) - 9:39; Zack Stringer (1) - 17:38 | | Second period | 9:01 - Josh Prokop (1) |
| Dylan Cozens (3) - 11:27 | | Third period | 6:13 - pp - Carson Focht (2); 19:55 - en - Luke Coleman (1) |
| Carl Tetachuk (31 saves / 35 shots) | | Goalie stats | Jack McNaughton (26 saves / 29 shots) |

| March 28 | Lethbridge Hurricanes | 2 – 5 | Calgary Hitmen | Scotiabank Saddledome | Recap |
| No scoring | | First period | 3:28 - Riley Stotts (1) |
| Jake Elmer (1) - 1:36; Logan Barlage (1) - pp - 12:42 | | Second period | 8:53 - James Malm (1) |
| No scoring | | Third period | 1:44 - Josh Prokop (2); 5:04 - pp - Vladislav Yerymenko (1); 17:45 - en - Luke Coleman (2) |
| Carl Tetachuk (30 saves / 34 shots) | | Goalie stats | Jack McNaughton (37 saves / 39 shots) |

| March 30* | Calgary Hitmen | 6 – 5 | Lethbridge Hurricanes | ENMAX Centre | Recap |
| Luke Coleman (3) - pp - 7:05; Mark Kastelic (2) - pp - 16:18 | | First period | 17:11 - Jordy Bellerive (1) |
| Josh Prokop (3) - 0:36; Vladislav Yeryomenko (2) - 4:45; Cael Zimmerman (1) - 17:51; Mark Kastelic (3) - 19:36 | | Second period | 2:59 - Jake Leschyshyn (4); 8:44 - pp - Nick Henry (3); 12:04 - pp - Logan Barlage (2) |
| No scoring | | Third period | 15:31 - pp - Jake Leschyshyn (5) |
| Jack McNaughton (29 saves / 34 shots) | | Goalie stats | Carl Tetachuk (32 shots / 36 saves); Bryan Thomson (4 shots / 6 saves) |

| March 31 | Lethbridge Hurricanes | 7 – 6 | OT | Calgary Hitmen | Scotiabank Saddledome | Recap |
| Zachary Cox (1) - 2:08; Dylan Cozens (4) - 3:08; Jordy Bellerive (2) - pp - 6:32 | | First period | | 1:00 - Kaden Elder (1); 12:53 - pp - Cael Zimmerman (2) |
| No scoring | | Second period | | 5:42 - Devan Klassen (2) |
| Nick Henry (4) - pp - 2:57; Jake Leschyshyn (6) - pp - 11:47; Calen Addison (2) - 19:27 | | Third period | | 11:12 - Ryder Korczak (2); 13:05 - James Malm (2); 17:37 - Mark Kastelic (4) |
| Taylor Ross (1) - 3:57 | | First overtime period | | No scoring |
| Carl Tetachuk (27 saves / 33 shots) | | Goalie stats | | Jack McNaughton (34 saves / 41 shots) |

| April 2* | Calgary Hitmen | 4 – 2 | Lethbridge Hurricanes | ENMAX Centre | Recap |
| Carson Focht (3) - pp - 3:30; Riley Fiddler-Schultz (1) - 15:23; Carson Focht (4) - 16:19 | | First period | No scoring |
| No scoring | | Second period | 2:49 - Zachary Cox (2); 12:52 - Alex Cotton (1) |
| Mark Kastelic (5) - en - 19:41 | | Third period | No scoring |
| Jack McNaughton (25 saves / 27 shots) | | Goalie stats | Carl Tetachuk (23 saves / 26 shots) |

| Calgary wins series 4 – 3 |

* Note: Games 5 and 7 were played at the Nicholas Sheran Arena in Lethbridge due to the 2019 World Men's Curling Championship taking place at the ENMAX Centre from March 30 to April 7.

=== Western Conference ===
==== (U1) Everett Silvertips vs. (W1) Tri-City Americans ====
| March 22 | Tri-City Americans | 1 – 6 | Everett Silvertips | Angel of the Winds Arena | Recap |
| No scoring | | First period | 17:44 - Connor Dewar (1) |
| No scoring | | Second period | No scoring |
| Nolan Yaremko (1) - 13:30 | | Third period | 6:54 - sh - Connor Dewar (2); 12:34 - Max Patterson (1); 17:40 - Zack Andrusiak (1); 18:39 - Lucas Cullen (1); 19:49 - pp - Martin Faško-Rudáš (1) |
| Beck Warm (42 saves / 47 shots) | | Goalie stats | Dustin Wolf (21 saves / 22 shots) |

| March 23 | Tri-City Americans | 3 – 4 | Everett Silvertips | Angel of the Winds Arena | Recap |
| Krystof Hrabik (1) - pp - 10:51 | | First period | 17:15 - pp - Martin Faško-Rudáš (2) |
| No scoring | | Second period | 9:02 - Jake Christiansen (1); 9:21 - Gage Goncalves (1); 18:23 - Robbie Holmes (1) |
| Nolan Yaremko (2) - sh - 2:36; Aaron Hyman (1) - pp - 18:58 | | Third period | No scoring |
| Beck Warm (35 saves / 39 shots) | | Goalie stats | Dustin Wolf (28 saves / 31 shots) |

| March 27 | Everett Silvertips | 2 – 3 | OT | Tri-City Americans | Toyota Center | Recap |
| Martin Faško-Rudáš (3) - pp - 17:35 | | First period | | No scoring |
| Bryce Kindopp (1) - pp - 19:51 | | Second period | | 16:54 - pp - Samuel Stewart (1) |
| No scoring | | Third period | | 2:16 - Nolan Yaremko (3) |
| No scoring | | First overtime period | | 7:52 - pp - Parker AuCoin (1) |
| Dustin Wolf (28 saves / 31 shots) | | Goalie stats | | Beck Warm (39 saves / 41 shots) |

| March 28 | Everett Silvertips | 3 – 0 | Tri-City Americans | Toyota Center | Recap |
| Bryce Kindopp (2) - pp - 12:34 | | First period | No scoring |
| Max Patterson (2) - 7:56 | | Second period | No scoring |
| Zack Andrusiak (2) - en - 19:19 | | Third period | No scoring |
| Dustin Wolf (24 saves / 24 shots) | | Goalie stats | Beck Warm (35 saves / 37 shots) |

| March 30 | Tri-City Americans | 1 – 9 | Everett Silvertips | Angel of the Winds Arena | Recap |
| No scoring | | First period | 11:59 - Bryce Kindopp (3); 15:15 - pp - Zack Andrusiak (3); 18:53 - Martin Faško-Rudáš (4) |
| No scoring | | Second period | 1:27 - Connor Dewar (3); 9:26 - Gage Goncalves (2); 11:44 - Bryce Kindopp (4) |
| Kyle Olson (1) - pp - 10:35 | | Third period | 2:07 - Bryce Kindopp (5); 7:14 - Zack Andrusiak (4); 11:12 - Ronan Seeley (1) |
| Beck Warm (21 saves / 27 shots); Talyn Boyko (16 saves / 19 shots) | | Goalie stats | Dustin Wolf (17 saves / 18 shots); Max Palaga (5 saves / 5 shots) |

| Everett wins series 4 – 1 |

==== (U2) Spokane Chiefs vs. (U3) Portland Winterhawks ====
| March 22 | Portland Winterhawks | 2 – 5 | Spokane Chiefs | Spokane Veterans Memorial Arena | Recap |
| Jake Gricius (1) - pp - 11:20 | | First period | No scoring |
| No scoring | | Second period | 3:08 - pp - Adam Beckman (1); 12:02 - pp - Riley Woods (1); 17:56 - pp - Jaret Anderson-Dolan (1) |
| Joachim Blichfeld (1) - pp - 19:03 | | Third period | 3:34 - Kaden Hanas (1); 4:23 - Ethan McIndoe (1) |
| Joel Hofer (17 saves / 22 shots) | | Goalie stats | Bailey Brkin (34 saves / 36 shots) |

| March 23 | Portland Winterhawks | 5 – 3 | Spokane Chiefs | Spokane Veterans Memorial Arena | Recap |
| No scoring | | First period | 6:19 - Jaret Anderson-Dolan (2) |
| Josh Paterson (1) - 15:25 | | Second period | 13:19 - Luc Smith (1) |
| Lane Gilliss (1) - 8:11; Josh Paterson (2) - 9:51; Mason Mannek (1) - 12:37; Matthew Quigley (1) - en - 17:45 | | Third period | 17:26 - Adam Beckman (2) |
| Joel Hofer (23 saves / 26 shots) | | Goalie stats | Bailey Brkin (30 saves / 34 shots) |

| March 26 | Spokane Chiefs | 5 – 4 | OT | Portland Winterhawks | Veterans Memorial Coliseum | Recap |
| Luke Toporowski (1) - 16:37 | | First period | | 1:39 - Robbie Fromm-Delorme (1); 6:57 - Joachim Blichfeld (2) |
| Luc Smith (2) - pp - 5:03; Ethan McIndoe (2) - 5:42 | | Second period | | 10:06 - Jared Freadrich (1) |
| Jack Finley (1) - 7:48 | | Third period | | 1:44 - Robbie Fromm-Delorme (2) |
| Riley Woods (2) - 9:35 | | First overtime period | | No scoring |
| Bailey Brkin (28 saves / 32 shots) | | Goalie stats | | Joel Hofer (38 saves / 43 shots) |

| March 27 | Spokane Chiefs | 4 – 3 | OT | Portland Winterhawks | Veterans Memorial Coliseum | Recap |
| Ty Smith (1) - 0:31 | | First period | | 9:51 - Brendan De Jong (1); 18:30 - Josh Paterson (3) |
| No scoring | | Second period | | 7:46 - Josh Paterson (4) |
| Luke Toporowski (2) - 3:25; Eli Zummack (1) - 19:00 | | Third period | | No scoring |
| Adam Beckman (3) - pp - 4:39 | | First overtime period | | No scoring |
| Bailey Brkin (35 saves / 38 shots) | | Goalie stats | | Joel Hofer (33 saves / 37 shots) |

| March 30 | Portland Winterhawks | 1 – 4 | Spokane Chiefs | Spokane Veterans Memorial Arena | Recap |
| Cody Glass (1) - sh - 4:04 | | First period | 4:52 - pp - Luke Toporowski (3); 17:52 - Luke Toporowski (4) |
| No scoring | | Second period | No scoring |
| No scoring | | Third period | 1:28 - Riley Woods (3); 3:13 - Riley Woods (4) |
| Joel Hofer (31 saves / 35 shots) | | Goalie stats | Bailey Brkin (38 saves / 39 shots) |

| Spokane wins series 4 – 1 |

==== (B1) Vancouver Giants vs. (W2) Seattle Thunderbirds ====
| March 22 | Seattle Thunderbirds | 1 – 7 | Vancouver Giants | Langley Events Centre | Recap |
| No scoring | | First period | No scoring |
| Andrej Kukuča (1) - 19:57 | | Second period | 1:20 - pp - Miloš Roman (1); 1:43 - Lukáš Švejkovský (1); 6:47 - sh - Jadon Joseph (1); 16:57 - Dylan Plouffe (1) |
| No scoring | | Third period | 2:10 - Dawson Holt (1); 4:23 - pp - Dylan Plouffe (2); 6:41 - Bowen Byram (1) |
| Roddy Ross (25 saves / 31 shots); Cole Schwebius (8 saves / 9 shots) | | Goalie stats | Trent Miner (27 saves / 28 shots) |

| March 23 | Seattle Thunderbirds | 4 – 1 | Vancouver Giants | Langley Events Centre | Recap |
| Sean Richards (1) - 4:38; Simon Kubicek (1) - pp - 15:09 | | First period | 18:10 - pp - Jadon Joseph (2) |
| No scoring | | Second period | No scoring |
| Andrej Kukuča (2) - 4:33; Nolan Volcan (1) - en - 17:58 | | Third period | No scoring |
| Roddy Ross (39 saves / 40 shots) | | Goalie stats | Trent Miner (24 saves / 27 shots) |

| March 26 | Vancouver Giants | 6 – 4 | Seattle Thunderbirds | ShoWare Center | Recap |
| Tristen Nielsen (1) - pp - 19:27 | | First period | 4:06 - Matthew Wedman (1) |
| Bowen Byram (2) - 3:21; Jadon Joseph (3) - pp - 18:48 | | Second period | 8:49 - pp - Payton Mount (1); 11:09 - pp - Payton Mount (2) |
| Alex Kannok Leipert (1) - 0:24; Dallas Hines (1) - 7:02; Brayden Watts (1) - en - 19:38 | | Third period | 16:38 - Sean Richards (2) |
| David Tendeck (25 saves / 29 shots) | | Goalie stats | Roddy Ross (31 saves / 36 shots) |

| March 27 | Vancouver Giants | 3 – 4 | Seattle Thunderbirds | ShoWare Center | Recap |
| Dylan Plouffe (3) - 10:33; Brayden Watts (2) - 17:00 | | First period | No scoring |
| Davis Koch (1) - 2:19 | | Second period | 5:18 - pp - Keltie Jeri-Leon (1) |
| No scoring | | Third period | 7:11 - Noah Philp (1); 11:13 - pp - Andrej Kukuča (3); 15:46 - Matthew Wedman (2) |
| David Tendeck (30 saves/34 shots) | | Goalie stats | Roddy Ross (26 saves / 29 shots) |

| March 29 | Seattle Thunderbirds | 2 – 3 | Vancouver Giants | Langley Events Centre | Recap |
| 14:Matthew Wedman (3) - pp - 14:14 | | First period | 7:06 - Dylan Plouffe (4); 12:58 - pp - Jadon Joseph (4) |
| Noah Philp (2) - pp - 3:57 | | Second period | No scoring |
| No scoring | | Third period | 4:43 - Dallas Hines (2) |
| Roddy Ross (30 saves / 33 shots) | | Goalie stats | Trent Miner (25 saves / 27 shots) |

| March 30 | Vancouver Giants | 5 – 1 | Seattle Thunderbirds | ShoWare Center | Recap |
| Bowen Byram (3) - 11:01 | | First period | No scoring |
| Jared Dmytriw (1) - sh - 7:14; Jadon Joseph (5) - 15:08; Jadon Joseph (6) - pp - 18:13 | | Second period | No scoring |
| Tristen Nielsen (2) - 2:40 | | Third period | 15:32 - Andrej Kukuča (4) |
| David Tendeck (33 saves / 34 shots) | | Goalie stats | Roddy Ross (28 saves / 33 shots) |

| Vancouver wins series 4 – 2 |

==== (B2) Victoria Royals vs. (B3) Kamloops Blazers ====
| March 22 | Kamloops Blazers | 0 – 4 | Victoria Royals | Save-On-Foods Memorial Centre | Recap |
| No scoring | | First period | 6:23 - Sean Gulka (1) |
| No scoring | | Second period | 9:51 - Carson Miller (1); 13:17 - Dino Kambeitz (1) |
| No scoring | | Third period | 16:23 - en - Dino Kambeitz (2) |
| Dylan Garand (33 saves / 36 shots) | | Goalie stats | Griffen Outhouse (28 saves / 28 shots) |

| March 23 | Kamloops Blazers | 4 – 3 | OT | Victoria Royals | Save-On-Foods Memorial Centre | Recap |
| Kyrell Sopotyk (1) - 5:21; Brodi Stuart (1) - 7:06 | | First period | | No scoring |
| No scoring | | Second period | | 2:53 - pp - Kody McDonald (1); 9:15 - pp - Carson Miller (2) |
| Kyrell Sopotyk (2) - pp - 3:54 | | Third period | | 4:11 - Kody McDonald (2) |
| Jermaine Loewen (1) - 5:14 | | First overtime period | | No scoring |
| Dylan Ferguson (39 saves / 42 shots) | | Goalie stats | | Griffen Outhouse (31 saves / 35 shots) |

| March 26 | Victoria Royals | 3 – 2 | Kamloops Blazers | Sandman Centre | Recap |
| Carson Miller (3) - 17:36 | | First period | 19:03 - Jermaine Loewen (2) |
| No scoring | | Second period | No scoring |
| Brandon Cutler (1) - 4:48; Kody McDonald (3) - 8:08 | | Third period | 2:15 - sh - Connor Zary (1) |
| Griffen Outhouse (32 saves / 34 shots) | | Goalie stats | Dylan Ferguson (28 saves / 31 shots) |

| March 27 | Victoria Royals | 3 – 6 | Kamloops Blazers | Sandman Centre | Recap |
| Dino Kambeitz (3) - sh - 10:37; Dino Kambeitz (4) - pp - 13:48 | | First period | 6:52 - Kyrell Sopotyk (3); 19:39 - pp - Connor Zary (2) |
| Igor Martynov (1) - 15:09 | | Second period | 8:11 - Zane Franklin (1) |
| No scoring | | Third period | 8:19 - Connor Zary (3); 10:52 - pp - Luke Zazula (1); 15:11 - pp - Martin Lang (1) |
| Griffen Outhouse (41 saves / 47 shots) | | Goalie stats | Dylan Ferguson (15 saves / 18 shots) |

| March 30 | Kamloops Blazers | 3 – 6 | Victoria Royals | Save-On-Foods Memorial Centre | Recap |
| Ryley Appelt (1) - 13:54 | | First period | 1:27 - D-Jay Jerome (1); 17:42 - pp - Dino Kambeitz (5) |
| No scoring | | Second period | 6:36 - Noah Lamb (1); 15:30 - Phillip Schultz (1) |
| Logan Stankoven (1) - 10:48; Jermaine Loewen (3) - 18:31 | | Third period | 18:07 - en - Tanner Sidaway (1); 19:20 - en - Phillip Schultz (2) |
| Dylan Ferguson (10 saves / 14 shots); Dylan Garand (9 saves / 9 shots) | | Goalie stats | Griffen Outhouse (27 saves / 30 shots) |

| April 1 | Victoria Royals | 4 – 1 | Kamloops Blazers | Sandman Centre | Recap |
| Brandon Cutler (2) - 12:05 | | First period | No scoring |
| Brandon Cutler (3) - pp - 5:57; Ralph Jarratt (1) - pp - 13:45; Carson Miller (1) - 19:49 | | Second period | No scoring |
| No scoring | | Third period | 14:18 - Orrin Centazzo (1) |
| Griffen Outhouse (34 saves / 35 shots) | | Goalie stats | Dylan Garand (9 saves / 13 shots); Dylan Ferguson (10 saves / 10 shots) |

| Victoria wins series 4 – 2 |

== Conference Semi-finals ==
=== Eastern Conference ===
==== (E1) Prince Albert Raiders vs. (E2) Saskatoon Blades ====
| April 5 | Saskatoon Blades | 1 – 6 | Prince Albert Raiders | Art Hauser Centre | Recap |
| 5:24 - Chase Wouters (2) | | First period | 3:47 - Sean Montgomery (2); 12:07 - Brett Leason (3) |
| No scoring | | Second period | 11:39 - Sean Montgomery (3); 17:42 - Parker Kelly (2) |
| No scoring | | Third period | 5:51 - pp - Sean Montgomery (4); 13:40 - pp - Parker Kelly (3) |
| Nolan Maier (31 saves / 36 shots); Koen MacInnes (2 saves / 3 shots) | | Goalie stats | Ian Scott (23 saves / 24 shots) |

| April 7 | Saskatoon Blades | 2 – 3 | Prince Albert Raiders | Art Hauser Centre | Recap |
| Kirby Dach (4) - 8:56 | | First period | No scoring |
| Eric Florchuk (1) - pp - 4:35 | | Second period | 19:31 - Zack Hayes (1) |
| No scoring | | Third period | 1:34 - Dante Hannoun (3); 2:11 - pp - Sean Montgomery (5) |
| Nolan Maier (29 saves / 32 shots) | | Goalie stats | Ian Scott (24 saves / 26 shots) |

| April 9 | Prince Albert Raiders | 0 – 1 | Saskatoon Blades | SaskTel Centre | Recap |
| No scoring | | First period | 4:21 - Kirby Dach (5) |
| No scoring | | Second period | No scoring |
| No scoring | | Third period | No scoring |
| Ian Scott (26 saves / 27 shots) | | Goalie stats | Nolan Maier (26 saves / 26 saves) |

| April 10 | Prince Albert Raiders | 1 – 4 | Saskatoon Blades | SaskTel Centre | Recap |
| Dante Hannoun (4) - sh - 11:15 | | First period | No scoring |
| No scoring | | Second period | 12:02 - pp - Max Gerlach (6); 13:13 - Tristen Robins (2) |
| No scoring | | Third period | 16:18 - Kyle Crnkovic (2); 17:53 - en - Eric Florchuk (2) |
| Ian Scott (34 saves / 37 shots) | | Goalie stats | Nolan Maier (43 saves / 44 shots) |

| April 12 | Saskatoon Blades | 1 – 6 | Prince Albert Raiders | Art Hauser Centre | Recap |
| No scoring | | First period | No scoring |
| Emil Malysjev (1) - 9:07 | | Second period | 2:51 - pp - Dante Hannoun (5); 6:01 - sh - Noah Gregor (3); 10:23 - Noah Gregor (4) |
| No scoring | | Third period | 1:01 - Aliaksei Protas (3); 12:31 - Dante Hannoun (6); 13:54 - Sean Montgomery (6) |
| Nolan Maier (19 saves / 25 shots); Koen MacInnes (0 saves / 0 shots) | | Goalie stats | Ian Scott (26 saves / 27 shots) |

| April 14 | Prince Albert Raiders | 6 – 3 | Saskatoon Blades | SaskTel Centre | Recap |
| Parker Kelly (4) - 10:28 | | First period | 16:45 - pp - Ryan Hughes (1) |
| Dante Hannoun (7) - 5:08; Aliaksei Protas (4) - pp - 8:18 | | Second period | 15:24 - pp - Ryan Hughes (2) |
| Dante Hannoun (8) - 3:33; Sean Montgomery (7) - pp - 5:27; Dante Hannoun (9) - en - 19:58 | | Third period | 5:56 - Tristen Robins (3) |
| Ian Scott (19 shots / 22 saves) | | Goalie stats | Nolan Maier (26 saves / 31 shots) |

| Prince Albert wins series 4 – 2 |

==== (C1) Edmonton Oil Kings vs. (C3) Calgary Hitmen ====
| April 6 | Calgary Hitmen | 2 – 3 | OT | Edmonton Oil Kings | Rogers Place | Recap |
| No scoring | | First period | | No scoring |
| Kaden Elder (2) - 10:00 | | Second period | | No scoring |
| Luke Coleman (4) - pp - 7:09 | | Third period | | 15:57 - Parker Gavlas (1); 19:47 - Jake Neighbours (1) |
| No scoring | | First overtime period | | 3:20 - Jake Neighbours (2) |
| Jack McNaughton (31 saves / 34 shots) | | Goalie stats | | Dylan Myskiw (20 saves / 22 shots) |

| April 7 | Calgary Hitmen | 1 – 4 | Edmonton Oil Kings | Rogers Place | Recap |
| No scoring | | First period | 9:22 - Quinn Benjafield (3) |
| Carson Focht (5) - pp - 10:31 | | Second period | 3:05 - Liam Keeler (2); 18:19 - Matthew Robertson (2) |
| No scoring | | Third period | 15:46 - pp - David Kope (1) |
| Jack McNaughton (35 saves / 39 shots) | | Goalie stats | Dylan Myskiw (26 saves / 27 shots) |

| April 9 | Edmonton Oil Kings | 2 – 1 | OT | Calgary Hitmen | Scotiabank Saddledome | Recap |
| No scoring | | First period | | No scoring |
| Zach Russell (1) - 7:57 | | Second period | | No scoring |
| No scoring | | Third period | | 18:53 - pp - Mark Kastelic (6) |
| Wyatt McLeod (2) - 2:46 | | First overtime period | | No scoring |
| Dylan Myskiw (24 saves / 25 shots) | | Goalie stats | | Jack McNaughton (27 saves / 29 shots) |

| April 10 | Edmonton Oil Kings | 6 – 0 | Calgary Hitmen | Scotiabank Saddledome | Recap |
| Scott Atkinson (2) - 4:56; Quinn Benjafield (4) - 17:59 | | First period | No scoring |
| Jake Neighbours (3) - 7:40; Vince Loschiavo (5) - pp - 9:15; Wyatt McLeod (3) - 17:38 | | Second period | No scoring |
| Andrew Fyten (3) - 5:53 | | Third period | No scoring |
| Dylan Myskiw (18 saves / 18 shots) | | Goalie stats | Jack McNaughton (24 saves / 29 shots); Carl Stankowski (7 saves / 8 shots) |

| Edmonton wins series 4 – 0 |

=== Western Conference ===
==== (U1) Everett Silvertips vs. (U2) Spokane Chiefs ====
| April 6 | Spokane Chiefs | 6 – 3 | Everett Silvertips | Angel of the Winds Arena | Recap |
| Ethan McIndoe (3) - 2:01 | | First period | 12:54 - Zack Andrusiak (5) |
| Eli Zummack (2) - 1:41 | | Second period | 19:34 - Jackson Berezowski (1) |
| Luke Toporowski (5) - 0:39; Riley Woods (5) - pp - 10:20; Ethan McIndoe (4) - 16:26; Luc Smith (3) - en - 18:06 | | Third period | 13:08 - Jackson Berezowski (2) |
| Bailey Brkin (29 saves / 32 shots) | | Goalie stats | Dustin Wolf (17 saves / 22 shots) |

| April 7 | Spokane Chiefs | 3 – 1 | Everett Silvertips | Angel of the Winds Arena | Recap |
| Jake McGrew (1) - 18:01 | | First period | 16:01 - Wyatte Wylie (1) |
| Eli Zummack (3) - pp - 16:56 | | Second period | No scoring |
| Luc Smith (4) - en - 19:28 | | Third period | No scoring |
| Bailey Brkin (30 saves / 31 shots) | | Goalie stats | Dustin Wolf (14 saves / 16 shots) |

| April 10 | Everett Silvertips | 1 – 3 | Spokane Chiefs | Spokane Veterans Memorial Arena | Recap |
| Robbie Holmes (2) - 9:39 | | First period | 7:42 - pp - Ethan McIndoe (5) |
| No scoring | | Second period | No scoring |
| No scoring | | Third period | 2:21 - Adam Beckman (4); 19:32 - en - Jaret Anderson-Dolan (3) |
| Dustin Wolf (17 saves / 19 shots) | | Goalie stats | Bailey Brkin (29 saves / 30 shots) |

| April 12 | Everett Silvertips | 4 – 1 | Spokane Chiefs | Spokane Veterans Memorial Arena | Recap |
| Robbie Holmes (3) - 6:21; Zack Andrusiak (6) - pp - 9:47 | | First period | 18:53 - pp - Adam Beckman (5) |
| Connor Dewar (4) - 6:41 | | Second period | No scoring |
| Connor Dewar (5) - en - 18:46 | | Third period | No scoring |
| Dustin Wolf (27 saves / 28 shots) | | Goalie stats | Bailey Brkin (23 saves / 26 shots) |

| April 13 | Everett Silvertips | 1 – 2 | Spokane Chiefs | Spokane Veterans Memorial Arena | Recap |
| 1:32 - Robbie Holmes (4) | | First period | Nolan Reid (1) - pp - 10:00 |
| No scoring | | Second period | Riley Woods (6) - pp - 5:24 |
| No scoring | | Third period | No scoring |
| Dustin Wolf (19 saves / 21 shots) | | Goalie stats | Bailey Brkin (34 saves / 35 shots) |

| Spokane wins series 4 – 1 |

==== (B1) Vancouver Giants vs. (B2) Victoria Royals ====
| April 5 | Victoria Royals | 0 – 3 | Vancouver Giants | Langley Events Centre | Recap |
| No scoring | | First period | 13:44 - pp - Davis Koch (2) |
| No scoring | | Second period | No scoring |
| No scoring | | Third period | 5:50 - Jared Dmytriw (2); 18:12 - en - Dawson Holt (2) |
| Griffen Outhouse (25 saves / 27 shots) | | Goalie stats | Trent Miner (15 saves / 15 shots) |

| April 6 | Victoria Royals | 1 – 2 | OT | Vancouver Giants | Langley Events Centre | Recap |
| No scoring | | First period | | No scoring |
| No scoring | | Second period | | 5:51 - pp - Lukáš Švejkovský (2) |
| Ralph Jarratt (2) - pp - 10:12 | | Third period | | No scoring |
| No scoring | | First overtime period | | 3:29 - Tristen Nielsen (3) |
| Griffen Outhouse (37 saves / 39 shots) | | Goalie stats | | David Tendeck (9 saves / 10 shots) |

| April 9 | Vancouver Giants | 5 – 4 | OT | Victoria Royals | Save-On-Foods Memorial Centre | Recap |
| Jared Dmytriw (3) - 3:32 | | First period | | 9:10 - Sean Gulka (2); 19:31 - pp - Igor Martynov (2) |
| Miloš Roman (2) - pp - 3:44 | | Second period | | 13:06 - Mitchell Prowse (1) |
| Owen Hardy (1) - 0:14; Alex Kannok Leipert (2) - 15:40 | | Third period | | 10:15 - Carson Miller (5) |
| Owen Hardy (2) - 13:34 | | First overtime period | | No scoring |
| Trent Miner (16 saves / 20 shots) | | Goalie stats | | Griffen Outhouse (52 saves / 57 shots) |

| April 11 | Vancouver Giants | 6 – 1 | Victoria Royals | Save-On-Foods Memorial Centre | Recap |
| Lukáš Švejkovský (3) - 10:04; Bowen Byram (4) - 16:19; Dallas Hines (3) - 16:37 | | First period | No scoring |
| Owen Hardy (3) - 9:39 | | Second period | 11:58 - D-Jay Jerome (2) |
| Brayden Watts (3) - 8:03; Jared Dmytriw (4) - pp - 12:47 | | Third period | No scoring |
| David Tendeck (17 saves / 18 shots) | | Goalie stats | Griffen Outhouse (27 saves / 33 shots) |

| Vancouver wins series 4 – 0 |

== Conference Finals ==
=== Eastern Conference ===
==== (E1) Prince Albert Raiders vs. (C1) Edmonton Oil Kings ====
| April 19 | Edmonton Oil Kings | 0 – 1 | Prince Albert Raiders | Art Hauser Centre | Recap |
| No scoring | | First period | No scoring |
| No scoring | | Second period | 1:48 - Ozzy Wiesblatt (4) |
| No scoring | | Third period | No scoring |
| Dylan Myskiw (23 saves / 24 shots) | | Goalie stats | Ian Scott (26 saves / 26 shots) |

| April 20 | Edmonton Oil Kings | 4 – 3 | OT | Prince Albert Raiders | Art Hauser Centre | Recap |
| Matthew Robertson (2) - pp - 13:58; Andrew Fyten (4) - pp - 19:31 | | First period | | 3:28 - Noah Gregor (5); 6:55 - Justin Nachbaur (1) |
| No scoring | | Second period | | No scoring |
| Trey Fix-Wolansky (4) - 5:38 | | Third period | | 2:47 - Aliaksei Protas (5) |
| Jake Neighbours (4) - 14:49 | | First overtime period | | No scoring |
| Dylan Myskiw (22 saves / 25 shots) | | Goalie stats | | Ian Scott (30 saves / 34 shots) |

| April 23 | Prince Albert Raiders | 1 – 5 | Edmonton Oil Kings | Rogers Place | Recap |
| No scoring | | First period | No scoring |
| Sean Montgomery (8) - pp - 19:59 | | Second period | 1:27 - Vince Loschiavo (6); 9:48 - Conner McDonald (2); 14:48 - pp - Vince Loschiavo (7); 18:54 - Matthew Robertson (4) |
| No scoring | | Third period | 16:05 - pp - Josh Williams (2) |
| Ian Scott (34 saves / 39 shots) | | Goalie stats | Dylan Myskiw (28 saves / 29 shots) |

| April 24 | Prince Albert Raiders | 2 – 1 | Edmonton Oil Kings | Rogers Place | Recap |
| No scoring | | First period | No scoring |
| Brett Leason (4) - 13:01 | | Second period | No scoring |
| Noah Gregor (6) - 2:13 | | Third period | 13:54 - Wyatt McLeod (4) |
| Ian Scott (25 saves / 26 shots) | | Goalie stats | Dylan Myskiw (25 saves / 27 shots) |

| April 26 | Edmonton Oil Kings | 0 – 4 | Prince Albert Raiders | Art Hauser Centre | Recap |
| No scoring | | First period | 11:31 - pp - Aliaksei Protas (6); 17:03 - Aliaksei Protas (7) |
| No scoring | | Second period | No scoring |
| No scoring | | Third period | 5:22 - Brett Leason (5); 19:35 - Aliaksei Protas (8) |
| Dylan Myskiw (26 saves / 30 shots) | | Goalie stats | Ian Scott (24 saves / 24 shots) |

| April 28 | Prince Albert Raiders | 4 – 2 | Edmonton Oil Kings | Rogers Place | Recap |
| Aliaksei Protas (9) - pp - 14:05; Aliaksei Protas (10) - 14:44; Noah Gregor (7) - pp - 17:58 | | First period | 11:49 - Trey Fix-Wolansky (5) |
| Aliaksei Protas (11) - 16:40 | | Second period | 10:41 - sh - Trey Fix-Wolansky (6) |
| No scoring | | Third period | No scoring |
| Ian Scott (32 saves / 34 shots) | | Goalie stats | Dylan Myskiw (20 saves / 24 shots) |

| Prince Albert wins series 4 – 2 |

=== Western Conference ===
==== (B1) Vancouver Giants vs. (U2) Spokane Chiefs ====
| April 19 | Spokane Chiefs | 1 – 4 | Vancouver Giants | Langley Events Centre | Recap |
| No scoring | | First period | 6:25 - pp - Lukáš Švejkovský (4); 8:37 - Dawson Holt (3) |
| Adam Beckman (6) - 5:30 | | Second period | 0:57 - Owen Hardy (4) |
| No scoring | | Third period | 18:06 - en - Bowen Byram (5) |
| Bailey Brkin (26 saves / 29 shots) | | Goalie stats | David Tendeck (30 saves / 31 shots) |

| April 20 | Spokane Chiefs | 2 – 4 | Vancouver Giants | Langley Events Centre | Recap |
| Noah King (1) - 19:41 | | First period | No scoring |
| Jaret Anderson-Dolan (4) - 0:19 | | Second period | No scoring |
| No scoring | | Third period | 5:15 - Dawson Holt (4); 7:11 - Jared Dmytriw (5); 7:33 - Jared Dmytriw (6); 8:36 - pp - Yannik Valenti (1) |
| Bailey Brkin (40 saves / 44 shots) | | Goalie stats | David Tendeck (24 saves / 26 shots) |

| April 23 | Vancouver Giants | 2 – 3 | OT | Spokane Chiefs | Spokane Veterans Memorial Arena | Recap |
| No scoring | | First period | | No scoring |
| No scoring | | Second period | | 17:40 - Eli Zummack (4) |
| Justin Sourdif (1) - 2:22; Jared Dmytriw (7) - pp - 17:01 | | Third period | | 10:51 - Luke Toporowski (6) |
| No scoring | | First overtime period | | 8:51 - Jake McGrew (2) |
| David Tendeck (35 saves / 38 shots) | | Goalie stats | | Bailey Brkin (27 saves / 29 shots) |

| April 24 | Vancouver Giants | 4 – 3 | OT | Spokane Chiefs | Spokane Veterans Memorial Arena | Recap |
| No scoring | | First period | | 18:38 - Adam Beckman (7) |
| No scoring | | Second period | | 10:06 - Adam Beckman (8) |
| Jadon Joseph (7) - 4:26; Bowen Byram (6) - pp - 9:11; Brayden Watts (4) - 10:04 | | Third period | | 16:25 - Riley Woods (7) |
| Dawson Holt (5) - 7:07 | | First overtime period | | No scoring |
| David Tendeck (28 saves / 31 shots) | | Goalie stats | | Bailey Brkin (26 saves / 30 shots) |

| April 26 | Spokane Chiefs | 2 – 3 | Vancouver Giants | Langley Events Centre | Recap |
| No scoring | | First period | 16:42 - sh - Bowen Byram (7); 19:22 - pp - Justin Sourdif (2) |
| No scoring | | Second period | No scoring |
| Jaret Anderson-Dolan (5) - pp - 4:22; Ethan McIndoe (6) - 18:13 | | Third period | 4:43 - Brayden Watts (5) |
| Bailey Brkin (29 saves / 32 shots) | | Goalie stats | David Tendeck (27 saves / 29 shots) |

| Vancouver wins series 4 – 1 |

== WHL Championship ==
=== (E1) Prince Albert Raiders vs. (B1) Vancouver Giants ===
| May 3 | Vancouver Giants | 5 – 4 | Prince Albert Raiders | Art Hauser Centre | Recap |
| Dylan Plouffe (5) - pp - 4:20; Dawson Holt (6) - 6:06 | | First period | No scoring |
| Jared Dmytriw (8) - 5:13; Yannik Valenti (2) - pp - 19:29; Dawson Holt (7) - 19:43 | | Second period | 3:20 - pp - Brett Leason (6); 6:17 - Noah Gregor (8); 16:45 - Dante Hannoun (10) |
| No scoring | | Third period | 2:50 - Jeremy Masella (1) |
| David Tendeck (25 saves / 29 shots) | | Goalie stats | Ian Scott (21 saves / 26 shots) |

| May 4 | Vancouver Giants | 0 – 4 | Prince Albert Raiders | Art Hauser Centre | Recap |
| No scoring | | First period | 10:17 - Dante Hannoun (11) |
| No scoring | | Second period | 7:43 - Sergei Sapego (3); 10:39 - pp - Noah Gregor (9) |
| No scoring | | Third period | 18:39 - en - Brett Leason (7) |
| David Tendeck (30 saves / 33 shots) | | Goalie stats | Ian Scott (15 saves / 15 shots) |

| May 7 | Prince Albert Raiders | 8 – 2 | Vancouver Giants | Langley Events Centre | Recap |
| Parker Kelly (5) - 0:41; Ozzy Wiesblatt (5) - pp - 2:27; Brett Leason (8) - 4:15; Cole Fonstad (2) - pp - 6:33; Brett Leason (9) - pp - 8:20; Parker Kelly (6) - 16:30; Noah Gregor (10) - 19:44 | | First period | No scoring |
| Dante Hannoun (12) - pp - 16:11 | | Second period | 19:08 - pp - Brayden Watts (6) |
| No scoring | | Third period | 14:44 - pp - Yannik Valenti (3) |
| Ian Scott (27 saves / 29 shots) | | Goalie stats | David Tendeck (10 saves / 13 shots); Trent Miner (9 saves / 14 shots) |

| May 8 | Prince Albert Raiders | 1 – 0 | Vancouver Giants | Langley Events Centre | Recap |
| No scoring | | First period | No scoring |
| No scoring | | Second period | No scoring |
| Brett Leason (10) - 4:21 | | Third period | No scoring |
| Ian Scott (36 saves / 36 shots) | | Goalie stats | David Tendeck (25 saves / 26 shots) |

| May 10 | Prince Albert Raiders | 3 – 4 | Vancouver Giants | Langley Events Centre | Recap |
| 10:44 - Aliaksei Protas (12) | | First period | Brayden Watts (7) - 7:42 |
| 2:45 - Dante Hannoun (13); 15:54 - Noah Gregor (11) | | Second period | Bowen Byram (8) - 3:35; Davis Koch (3) - 9:24; Dylan Plouffe (6) - 11:13 |
| No scoring | | Third period | No scoring |
| Ian Scott (26 saves / 30 shots) | | Goalie stats | David Tendeck (37 saves / 40 shots) |

| May 12 | Vancouver Giants | 4 – 2 | Prince Albert Raiders | Art Hauser Centre | Recap |
| 6:58 - Davis Koch (4); 15:17 - Owen Hardy (5) | | First period | Parker Kelly (7) - 0:53; Parker Kelly (8) - 19:27 |
| No scoring | | Second period | No scoring |
| 3:40 - Jared Dmytriw (9); 19:45 - en - Davis Koch (5) | | Third period | No scoring |
| David Tendeck (36 saves / 38 shots) | | Goalie stats | Ian Scott (23 saves / 26 shots) |

| May 13 | Vancouver Giants | 2 – 3 | OT | Prince Albert Raiders | Art Hauser Centre | Recap |
| No scoring | | First period | | No scoring |
| Miloš Roman (3) - 4:45 | | Second period | | 14:55 - Noah Gregor (12) |
| Miloš Roman (4) - pp - 8:30 | | Third period | | 4:25 - Noah Gregor (13) |
| No scoring | | First overtime period | | 18:25 - Dante Hannoun (14) |
| David Tendeck (37 saves / 40 shots) | | Goalie stats | | Ian Scott (24 shots / 26 saves) |

| Prince Albert wins series 4 – 3 |

== Playoff scoring leaders ==
Note: GP = Games played; G = Goals; A = Assists; Pts = Points; PIM = Penalty minutes

| Player | Team | GP | G | A | Pts | PIM |
|---|---|---|---|---|---|---|
| Bowen Byram | Vancouver Giants | 22 | 8 | 18 | 26 | 18 |
| Brett Leason | Prince Albert Raiders | 22 | 10 | 15 | 25 | 15 |
| Dante Hannoun | Prince Albert Raiders | 23 | 14 | 10 | 24 | 14 |
| Noah Gregor | Prince Albert Raiders | 23 | 13 | 11 | 24 | 10 |
| Aliaksei Protas | Prince Albert Raiders | 23 | 12 | 10 | 22 | 6 |
| Jared Dmytriw | Vancouver Giants | 22 | 9 | 12 | 21 | 16 |
| Davis Koch | Vancouver Giants | 22 | 5 | 16 | 21 | 0 |
| Parker Kelly | Prince Albert Raiders | 23 | 8 | 9 | 17 | 14 |
| Dawson Holt | Vancouver Giants | 22 | 7 | 9 | 16 | 6 |
| Dylan Plouffe | Vancouver Giants | 22 | 6 | 10 | 16 | 23 |

== Playoff leading goaltenders ==
Note: GP = Games played; Mins = Minutes played; W = Wins; L = Losses; GA = Goals Allowed; SO = Shutouts; SV& = Save percentage; GAA = Goals against average

| Player | Team | GP | Mins | W | L | GA | SO | Sv% | GAA |
|---|---|---|---|---|---|---|---|---|---|
| Ian Scott | Prince Albert Raiders | 23 | 1406 | 16 | 7 | 46 | 5 | .925 | 1.96 |
| Dustin Wolf | Everett Silvertips | 10 | 595 | 5 | 5 | 20 | 1 | .914 | 2.02 |
| Dylan Myskiw | Edmonton Oil Kings | 13 | 774 | 7 | 6 | 28 | 1 | .913 | 2.17 |
| David Tendeck | Vancouver Giants | 17 | 1034 | 11 | 5 | 41 | 0 | .918 | 2.38 |
| Bailey Brkin | Spokane Chiefs | 15 | 917 | 9 | 6 | 39 | 0 | .922 | 2.55 |

== WHL awards ==
| Name | Award | Winner |
|---|---|---|
| Ed Chynoweth Cup | WHL Champions | Prince Albert Raiders |
| Scotty Munro Memorial Trophy | Regular season champions | Prince Albert Raiders |
| Four Broncos Memorial Trophy | Player of the Year | Joachim Blichfeld, Portland Winterhawks |
| Bob Clarke Trophy | Top Scorer | Joachim Blichfeld, Portland Winterhawks |
| Bill Hunter Memorial Trophy | Top Defenceman | Ty Smith, Spokane Chiefs |
| Jim Piggott Memorial Trophy | Rookie of the Year | Brayden Tracey, Moose Jaw Warriors |
| Del Wilson Trophy | Top Goaltender | Ian Scott, Prince Albert Raiders |
| WHL Plus-Minus Award | Top Plus-Minus Rating | Brayden Pachal, Prince Albert Raiders |
| Brad Hornung Trophy | Most Sportsmanlike Player | Justin Almeida, Moose Jaw Warriors |
| Daryl K. (Doc) Seaman Trophy | Scholastic Player of the Year | Dustin Wolf, Everett Silvertips |
| Jim Donlevy Memorial Trophy | Scholastic team of the Year | Portland Winterhawks |
| Dunc McCallum Memorial Trophy | Coach of the Year | Marc Habscheid, Prince Albert Raiders |
| Lloyd Saunders Memorial Trophy | Executive of the Year | Curtis Hunt, Prince Albert Raiders |
| Allen Paradice Memorial Trophy | Top Official | Brett Iverson |
| St. Clair Group Trophy | Marketing/Public Relations Award | Everett Silvertips |
| Doug Wickenheiser Memorial Trophy | Humanitarian of the Year | Will Warm, Edmonton Oil Kings |
| WHL Playoff MVP | WHL Finals Most Valuable Player | Ian Scott, Prince Albert Raiders |
| Professional Hockey Achievement; Academic Recipient | Alumni Achievement Awards | Patrick Marleau |

=== All-Star teams ===
==== Eastern Conference ====
| First Team | | Pos. | Second Team | |
| Player | Team | Pos. | Player | Team |
|---|---|---|---|---|
| Ian Scott | Prince Albert Raiders | G | Mads Sogaard | Medicine Hat Tigers |
| Josh Brook | Moose Jaw Warriors | D | Jett Woo | Moose Jaw Warriors |
| Dawson Davidson | Saskatoon Blades | D | Brayden Pachal | Prince Albert Raiders |
| Trey Fix-Wolansky | Edmonton Oil Kings | F | Brandon Hagel | Red Deer Rebels |
| Tristin Langan | Moose Jaw Warriors | F | Stelio Mattheos | Brandon Wheat Kings |
| Brett Leason | Prince Albert Raiders | F | Mark Kastelic | Calgary Hitmen |

==== Western Conference ====
| First Team | | Pos. | Second Team | |
| Player | Team | Pos. | Player | Team |
|---|---|---|---|---|
| Dustin Wolf | Everett Silvertips | G | Beck Warm | Tri-City Americans |
| Ty Smith | Spokane Chiefs | D | Lassi Thomson | Kelowna Rockets |
| Bowen Byram | Vancouver Giants | D | Scott Walford | Victoria Royals |
| Joachim Blichfeld | Portland Winterhawks | F | Parker AuCoin | Tri-City Americans |
| Cody Glass | Portland Winterhawks | F | Matthew Wedman | Seattle Thunderbirds |
| Connor Dewar | Everett Silvertips | F | Riley Woods | Spokane Chiefs |

== See also ==
- List of WHL seasons
- 2018–19 OHL season
- 2018–19 QMJHL season
- 2018 in ice hockey
- 2019 in ice hockey

| Preceded by 2017–18 WHL season | WHL seasons | Succeeded by 2019–20 WHL season |
