= Brett Leason =

Canadian ice hockey player (born 1999)

- Leason with the San Jose Sharks in 2026
- Born: April 30, 1999 (age 27) Calgary, Alberta, Canada
- Height: 6 ft 5 in (196 cm)
- Weight: 220 lb (100 kg; 15 st 10 lb)
- Position: Right wing
- Shoots: Right
- NHL team Former teams: San Jose Sharks; Washington Capitals; Anaheim Ducks
- NHL draft: 56th overall, 2019; Washington Capitals
- Playing career: 2019–present

Brett Leason (born April 30, 1999) is a Canadian professional ice hockey winger for the San Jose Sharks of the National Hockey League (NHL). He was selected 56th overall by the Capitals in the 2019 NHL entry draft after going undrafted the previous two years, and has also played in the NHL for the Anaheim Ducks.

== Playing career ==
=== Amateur career ===
Leason played his minor hockey in Calgary, Alberta, for the Calgary Stampeders and the junior Calgary Flames organizations of the Alberta Minor Hockey Association. He was chosen in the third round, 50th overall by the Tri-City Americans of the Western Hockey League (WHL) in the 2014 WHL Bantam Draft. He earned a silver medal with Calgary North at the 2015 Alberta Cup. Starting the 2016–17 season, Leason earned a spot with the Americans but could not move up in their roster and was traded the following season to the Prince Albert Raiders for a draft pick. After joining the Raiders, Leason blossomed, scoring 15 goals and 32 points in his next 54 games. In the 2018–19 season, Leason led the Raiders in scoring with 36 goals and 89 points. With his solid play, the Raiders earned a first place finish in the league. Leason continued his great play into the WHL playoffs, where he led his team in scoring with 10 goals and 25 points in 22 games, helping the Raiders win the Ed Chynoweth Cup as champions of the WHL. Leason and the Raiders were invited to the 2019 Memorial Cup tournament, but finished fourth. Leason was named to the WHL (East) First All-Star Team at the end of the season.

=== Professional career ===
He was selected 56th overall by the Washington Capitals of the National Hockey League (NHL) in the 2019 NHL entry draft after going undrafted the previous two years. On July 11, 2019, Leason signed a three-year, entry-level contract with the Capitals. Leason played his first two full professional seasons in the American Hockey League (AHL) with the Hershey Bears. Leason made his NHL debut for the Washington Capitals on October 29, 2021, against the Arizona Coyotes. Three days later, he scored his first NHL goal on Andrei Vasilevskiy in a 3–2 loss to the Tampa Bay Lightning. He finished the season with three goals and six points in 36 games with the Capitals. Leason made his Stanley Cup playoffs debut on Game 2 of Washington's first round series against the Florida Panthers replacing Tom Wilson who was injured in Game 1. On June 20, 2022, he re-signed with the Capitals to a two-year, $1.55 million contract. Leason failed to make the Capitals team out of training camp and was placed on waivers on October 9, 2022.

On October 10, 2022, Leason was claimed off waivers by the Anaheim Ducks. He made his Ducks debut in a 6–4 loss to the New York Rangers on October 17. Leason scored his first goal as a Duck against James Reimer in a 5–4 win over the San Jose Sharks on November 5.

Following his third season with the Ducks in 2024–25, Leason as a pending restricted free agent was not tendered a qualifying offer, ending his tenure in Anaheim.

Un-signed over the summer, Leason initially accepted an invitation to join the Minnesota Wild training camp for the 2025–26 season. After his release by the Wild, Leason was later signed to a PTO in joining the Charlotte Checkers, affiliate to the Florida Panthers on October 13, 2025. Two weeks later, Leason returned to the NHL, signing a one-year contract to return to the Capitals on October 27.

On July 2, 2026, having left the Capitals as a free agent he was signed to a one-year, two-way contract by the San Jose Sharks for the 2026–27 season.

== International play ==
Leason also represented Team Canada at the 2019 World Juniors. He registered three goals and five points in the five games Canada played.

== Career statistics ==
=== Regular season and playoffs ===
			Regular season					Playoffs
Season	Team	League	GP	G	A	Pts	PIM	GP	G	A	Pts	PIM
2015–16	Calgary Canucks	AJHL	1	0	0	0	0	—	—	—	—	—
2015–16	Tri-City Americans	WHL	1	0	0	0	0	—	—	—	—	—
2016–17	Calgary Canucks	AJHL	1	0	0	0	0	—	—	—	—	—
2016–17	Tri-City Americans	WHL	68	8	10	18	6	4	0	0	0	0
2017–18	Tri-City Americans	WHL	12	1	0	1	2	—	—	—	—	—
2017–18	Prince Albert Raiders	WHL	54	15	17	32	14	7	0	3	3	0
2018–19	Prince Albert Raiders	WHL	55	36	53	89	28	22	10	15	25	15
2019–20	Hershey Bears	AHL	50	3	11	14	12	—	—	—	—	—
2020–21	Hershey Bears	AHL	33	9	11	20	8	—	—	—	—	—
2021–22	Hershey Bears	AHL	31	6	7	13	14	2	1	0	1	0
2021–22	Washington Capitals	NHL	36	3	3	6	4	1	0	0	0	0
2022–23	Anaheim Ducks	NHL	54	6	3	9	14	—	—	—	—	—
2023–24	Anaheim Ducks	NHL	68	11	11	22	14	—	—	—	—	—
2024–25	Anaheim Ducks	NHL	62	5	12	17	22	—	—	—	—	—
2025–26	Hershey Bears	AHL	56	14	30	44	47	6	2	0	2	0
2025–26	Washington Capitals	NHL	6	0	0	0	0	—	—	—	—	—
NHL totals			226	25	29	54	54	1	0	0	0	0

=== International ===
Year	Team	Event	Result	GP	G	A	Pts	PIM
2019	Canada	WJC	6th	5	3	2	5	0
Junior totals				5	3	2	5	0

== Awards and honors ==
Award	Year	Ref
NHL
E.J. McGuire Award of Excellence	2019	
