= Linus Nässén (ice hockey, born 1998) =

Swedish ice hockey player

- Born: May 10, 1998 (age 28) Norrtälje, Sweden
- Height: 6 ft 0 in (183 cm)
- Weight: 185 lb (84 kg; 13 st 3 lb)
- Position: Defence
- Shoots: Left
- SHL team Former teams: Timrå IK; Luleå HF; Växjö Lakers; Jukurit
- NHL draft: 89th overall, 2016; Florida Panthers
- Playing career: 2016–present

Linus Nässén (born May 10, 1998) is a Swedish professional ice hockey defenceman. He is currently playing with Timrå IK of the Swedish Hockey League (SHL).

== Playing career ==
Nässén made his Swedish Hockey League debut during the 2015–16 SHL season. He appeared in 10 scoreless games with Luleå HF as a 17-year old before he was selected in the third round, 89th overall, in the 2016 NHL entry draft by the Florida Panthers.

After continuing in the SHL with Luleå HF for the 2016–17 season, Nässén opted to further his development in North America, selected in the CHL import draft for the second consecutive season and signing with the Medicine Hat Tigers of the Western Hockey League (WHL), on September 21, 2017.

Nässén was productive from the blueline in each of his two seasons with Medicine Hat, however did not receive a contract offer from the Panthers. On April 15, 2019, he agreed to return to his native Sweden, agreeing to a two-year contract with the Växjö Lakers to resume his SHL career.

== Career statistics ==
=== Regular season and playoffs ===
			Regular season					Playoffs
Season	Team	League	GP	G	A	Pts	PIM	GP	G	A	Pts	PIM
2014–15	Luleå HF	J20	5	0	0	0	0	—	—	—	—	—
2015–16	Luleå HF	J20	42	5	16	21	22	2	0	0	0	2
2015–16	Luleå HF	SHL	10	0	0	0	0	—	—	—	—	—
2016–17	Luleå HF	J20	25	3	13	16	37	3	1	0	1	0
2016–17	Luleå HF	SHL	21	1	1	2	2	—	—	—	—	—
2016–17	AIK	Allsv	4	0	0	0	2	—	—	—	—	—
2017–18	Medicine Hat Tigers	WHL	44	1	25	26	14	3	0	0	0	0
2018–19	Medicine Hat Tigers	WHL	62	7	39	46	18	6	3	2	5	4
2019–20	Växjö Lakers	SHL	35	0	0	0	0	—	—	—	—	—
2019–20	Modo Hockey	Allsv	7	0	0	0	0	2	0	1	1	2
2020–21	Växjö Lakers	SHL	33	0	3	3	4	13	0	2	2	0
2020–21	HC Vita Hästen	Allsv	6	0	3	3	0	—	—	—	—	—
2021–22	Jukurit	Liiga	59	3	23	26	16	7	1	3	4	2
2022–23	Jukurit	Liiga	56	4	17	21	18	—	—	—	—	—
2023–24	Jukurit	Liiga	57	5	30	35	14	6	1	0	1	0
2024–25	Timrå IK	SHL	49	2	16	18	16	6	0	2	2	0
SHL totals			148	3	20	23	22	19	0	4	4	0
Liiga totals			172	12	70	82	48	13	2	3	5	2

=== International ===
Year	Team	Event	Result	GP	G	A	Pts	PIM
2015	Sweden	IH18	2nd place, silver medalist(s)	4	0	0	0	0
Junior totals				4	0	0	0	0

== Awards and honours ==
Award	Year
SHL
Le Mat Trophy (Växjö Lakers)	2021
