= Jaret Anderson-Dolan =

Canadian ice hockey player (born 1999)

- Born: September 12, 1999 (age 27) Calgary, Alberta, Canada
- Height: 5 ft 11 in (180 cm)
- Weight: 200 lb (91 kg; 14 st 4 lb)
- Position: Centre
- Shoots: Left
- SHL team Former teams: Brynäs IF; Los Angeles Kings; Nashville Predators; Winnipeg Jets
- National team: Canada
- NHL draft: 41st overall, 2017; Los Angeles Kings
- Playing career: 2018–present

Jaret Lynn Anderson-Dolan (born September 12, 1999) is a Canadian professional ice hockey forward for Brynäs IF of the Swedish Hockey League (SHL). Anderson-Dolan was selected in the second round of the 2017 NHL entry draft, 41st overall, by the Los Angeles Kings.

== Playing career ==
=== Junior ===
As a 14-year old with the Edge School Mountaineers Bantam AAA team, Anderson-Dolan scored 103 points in 50 games.

Anderson-Dolan was drafted 14th in the 2014 WHL Bantam Draft to the Spokane Chiefs. He was expected to be one of the top 5 selections but slipped because some teams did not want to draft him because of his family situation. He put up 76 points in 72 regular season games in his sophomore 2016–17 season. He ended the season as the 21st ranked North American skater by NHL Central Scouting.

=== Professional ===
Anderson-Dolan was drafted 41st overall in the 2nd round of the 2017 NHL entry draft by the Los Angeles Kings. He signed a three-year entry-level contract with the Kings on September 25, 2017.

After completing the 2017–18 season with the Chiefs, Anderson-Dolan was loaned to the Kings American Hockey League affiliate, the Ontario Reign, on April 6, 2018.

After attending the Kings training camp, Anderson-Dolan was named to the Kings opening night roster. Sitting as a healthy scratch for the Kings first game on October 5, he made his NHL debut on October 7 against the Detroit Red Wings. By making his debut, Anderson-Dolan became the youngest Kings player since Craig Redmond in 1984 and 10th youngest in franchise history. Two games later on October 11, he recorded his first career NHL point, an assist on Michael Amadio's goal, in a 3–0 win over the Montreal Canadiens. He was reassigned to the Spokane Chiefs on October 22, after playing in five NHL games and earning one point, and in the same day was added to Team WHL to compete at the 2018 CHL Canada/Russia Series. The following day, Anderson-Dolan was named co-captain of the Chiefs alongside Ty Smith. On March 16, 2019, Anderson-Dolan was awarded the Chiefs' Players' Player award for the 2018–19 season.

In the 2020–21 season, the Kings named Anderson-Dolan to their taxi squad. He was recalled to the active roster on February 5, 2021, and on February 7 scored his first NHL goal on Robin Lehner in a 4–3 loss to the Vegas Golden Knights.

As a restricted free agent, Anderson-Dolan was signed to a one-year, two-way contract extension with the Kings on July 23, 2022. In the following 2022–23 season, Anderson-Dolan collected his first career multi-goal game in the NHL on January 22, 2023, scoring both Kings goals in a 2–1 win over the Chicago Blackhawks.

During the 2023–24 season, following 30 games with the Kings, contributing just 4 points, Anderson-Dolan was claimed by the Nashville Predators off waivers on March 7, 2024. He remained on the Predators roster for the remainder of the season, making a lone appearance.

Leaving the Predators as a free agent, Anderson-Dolan signed a two-year, $1.55 million contract with the Winnipeg Jets on July 2, 2024.

At the conclusion of his two seasons within the Jets organization, Anderson-Dolan left North America as a free agent and was signed to a two-year contract with Swedish club, Brynäs IF of the SHL, on July 17, 2026.

== International play ==
Medal record

Representing Canada

Ice hockey

World Championships
Gold medal – first place	2021 Latvia	

On April 12, 2017, Anderson-Dolan was selected as team captain to represent Canada at the 2017 IIHF World U18 Championships. Team Canada was eliminated in the quarter-finals against Sweden.

On December 25, 2018, Anderson-Dolan was named an alternate captain for Team Canada, along with Evan Bouchard and Ian Mitchell, for the 2019 World Junior Ice Hockey Championships.

In May 2021, Anderson-Dolan joined Team Canada at the 2021 IIHF World Championship for his first senior international tournament. He was named Canada's player of the game following their May 28 win against Kazakhstan.

== Personal life ==
Prior to his draft year, Anderson-Dolan's personal life drew significant interest from hockey personnel. Anderson-Dolan and his older brother, Dorian were raised by two mothers, Fran and Nancy. As a result of his upbringing, Anderson-Dolan has been active in promoting support for the LGBTQ community and in efforts to end homophobia, and became the first NHL player to have been raised from a same-sex marriage. Both of his mothers were hockey players, and he learned to skate from mother Fran, his first coach.

== Career statistics ==
=== Regular season and playoffs ===
			Regular season					Playoffs
Season	Team	League	GP	G	A	Pts	PIM	GP	G	A	Pts	PIM
2014–15	Spokane Chiefs	WHL	5	0	0	0	0	1	0	0	0	0
2015–16	Spokane Chiefs	WHL	65	14	12	26	21	6	1	2	3	2
2016–17	Spokane Chiefs	WHL	72	39	37	76	22	—	—	—	—	—
2017–18	Spokane Chiefs	WHL	70	40	51	91	27	7	2	7	9	4
2017–18	Ontario Reign	AHL	5	0	2	2	2	3	0	0	0	0
2018–19	Los Angeles Kings	NHL	5	0	1	1	0	—	—	—	—	—
2018–19	Spokane Chiefs	WHL	32	20	23	43	15	15	5	8	13	8
2019–20	Ontario Reign	AHL	53	8	20	28	31	—	—	—	—	—
2019–20	Los Angeles Kings	NHL	4	0	0	0	0	—	—	—	—	—
2020–21	Los Angeles Kings	NHL	34	7	4	11	6	—	—	—	—	—
2021–22	Ontario Reign	AHL	54	24	23	47	51	5	0	1	1	10
2021–22	Los Angeles Kings	NHL	7	0	0	0	4	—	—	—	—	—
2022–23	Los Angeles Kings	NHL	46	7	5	12	2	4	0	0	0	0
2023–24	Los Angeles Kings	NHL	30	1	3	4	6	—	—	—	—	—
2023–24	Ontario Reign	AHL	3	2	0	2	0	—	—	—	—	—
2023–24	Nashville Predators	NHL	1	0	0	0	0	—	—	—	—	—
2024–25	Manitoba Moose	AHL	51	7	12	19	30	—	—	—	—	—
2024–25	Winnipeg Jets	NHL	7	0	1	1	4	5	1	1	2	2
2025–26	Manitoba Moose	AHL	72	13	23	36	58	7	0	1	1	0
NHL totals			134	15	14	29	22	9	1	1	2	2

=== International ===
Year	Team	Event	Result	GP	G	A	Pts	PIM
2015	Canada White	U17	1st place, gold medalist(s)	6	1	3	4	8
2017	Canada	U18	5th	5	0	0	0	4
2019	Canada	WJC	6th	5	1	0	1	2
2021	Canada	WC	1st place, gold medalist(s)	10	0	2	2	0
Junior totals				16	2	3	5	14
Senior totals				10	0	2	2	0
