= Mark Kastelic =

American ice hockey player (born 1999)

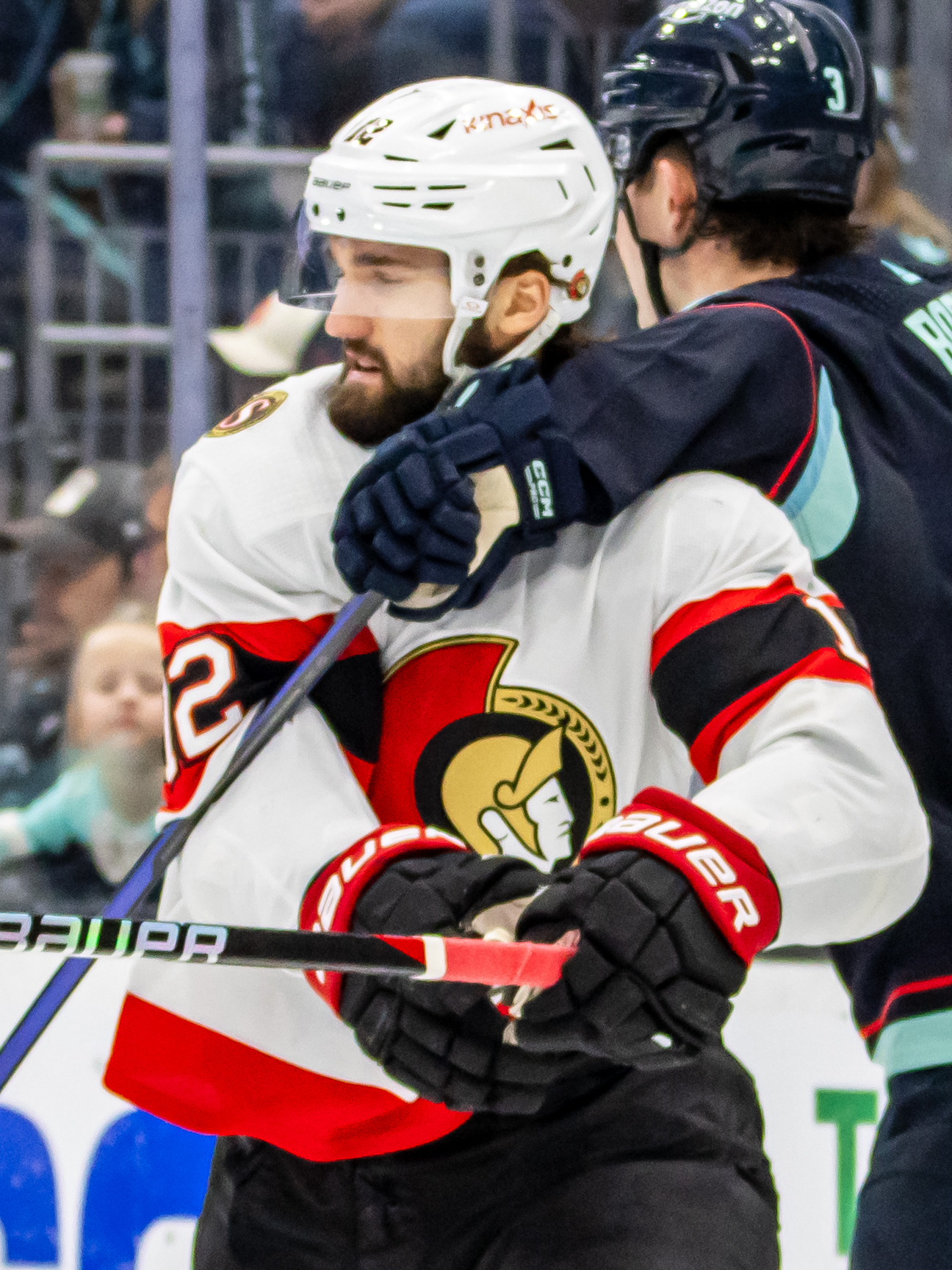
- Kastelic with the Ottawa Senators in 2024
- Born: March 11, 1999 (age 27) Phoenix, Arizona, U.S.
- Height: 6 ft 4 in (193 cm)
- Weight: 234 lb (106 kg; 16 st 10 lb)
- Position: Center
- Shoots: Right
- NHL team Former teams: Boston Bruins; Ottawa Senators
- NHL draft: 125th overall, 2019; Ottawa Senators
- Playing career: 2021–present

Mark Kastelic (born March 11, 1999) is an American professional ice hockey player who is a center for the Boston Bruins of the National Hockey League (NHL). Kastelic was drafted in the fifth round of the 2019 NHL entry draft by the Ottawa Senators.

== Early life ==
Kastelic was born in Phoenix, Arizona. Kastelic played his youth ice hockey years with the Phoenix Jr. Coyotes teams while attending Desert Vista High School.

== Playing career ==
=== Amateur ===
Kastelic joined the Calgary Hitmen junior team of the Western Hockey League (WHL) in 2015. He played five seasons for the Hitmen. His best season was 2018–19 when he scored 47 goals and had 77 points. He served as team captain for the 2018–19 and 2019–20 seasons. He went undrafted twice during his time with Calgary.

=== Professional ===
==== Ottawa Senators ====
After his outstanding 2018–19 season, Kastelic was drafted in the 2019 NHL entry draft in the fifth round, 125th overall, as an over-age player by the Ottawa Senators. Kastelic signed a three-year, entry-level contract with the Senators. Kastelic returned to Calgary for the 2019–20 and 2020–21 seasons. In 2021, Kastelic made his professional debut, joining the Belleville Senators of the American Hockey League (AHL), Ottawa's primary minor-league affiliate.

Due to injuries to several Senators players, Kastelic was called up to Ottawa in January 2022. Kastelic made his NHL debut on January 29, 2022, against the Anaheim Ducks. On April 23, Kastelic scored his first two career NHL goals, including the eventual game-winner, in a 6–4 win against the Montreal Canadiens.

During the 2022–23 season, Kastelic made the Ottawa Senators out of training camp and became an NHL regular. Impressed with his play, general manager Pierre Dorion signed him to a two-year $1.67 million contract on October 27, 2022. On January 13, 2023, Kastelic scored the game-winning goal in a 5–3 win over the Arizona Coyotes, playing in his hometown for the first time. During the NHL All-Star break, Kastelic was sent back to Belleville on February 2, 2023, after having missed the previous four Ottawa games with an illness/injury. He was recalled on February 25.

==== Boston Bruins ====
On June 24, 2024, Kastelic was traded alongside Joonas Korpisalo and a 2024 first round pick to the Boston Bruins, in exchange for goaltender Linus Ullmark.

Making the Bruins roster out of camp, Kastelic had a successful start to the season, and provided solid fourth-line scoring to the team. In the second game of the season, on October 10, 2024, Kastelic had his second career two goal game against the Montreal Canadiens. Just four days later, on October 14, 2024, Kastelic had his first career three-point game, notching three assists in a 4-3 loss to the Florida Panthers. Kastelic also played a big role in the 6-3 victory in the Bruins Centennial Game matchup against the Canadiens, registering two assists. This led to Kastelic signing a three-year, $1.567 million AAV deal with the team on January 3, 2025. However, after the 4 Nations break in mid-February, the Bruins struggled mightily, and Kastelic was unable to produce. After the break, Kastelic only managed to score a single goal. Kastelic was injured on March 22, 2025, against the Vegas Golden Knights, with no timetable to return. On April 10, 2025, it was announced that Kastelic would not return for the rest of the season. Kastelic finished his first season with the Bruins with five goals and nine assists for 14 points, tying his career high for goals, and breaking his previous career high for assists and points.

== Personal ==
Kastelic is of Slovenian descent. His father Ed is a former professional ice hockey player who played 220 games for the Washington Capitals and Hartford Whalers of the NHL. His grandfather Pat Stapleton played over 600 games for the Chicago Blackhawks and the Boston Bruins of the NHL. His uncle Mike Stapleton played 697 games in the NHL for several teams.

== Career statistics ==
=== Regular season and playoffs ===
			Regular season					Playoffs
Season	Team	League	GP	G	A	Pts	PIM	GP	G	A	Pts	PIM
2014–15	Phoenix Jr. Coyotes	T1EHL	24	5	10	15	38	4	1	3	4	4
2015–16	Calgary Hitmen	WHL	59	5	5	10	39	5	0	1	1	4
2016–17	Calgary Hitmen	WHL	67	13	22	35	65	4	0	1	1	10
2017–18	Calgary Hitmen	WHL	71	23	22	45	93	—	—	—	—	—
2018–19	Calgary Hitmen	WHL	66	47	30	77	122	9	6	3	9	18
2019–20	Calgary Hitmen	WHL	58	38	30	68	83	—	—	—	—	—
2020–21	Belleville Senators	AHL	31	4	6	10	18	—	—	—	—	—
2021–22	Belleville Senators	AHL	64	14	14	28	87	2	0	2	2	4
2021–22	Ottawa Senators	NHL	16	2	2	4	14	—	—	—	—	—
2022–23	Ottawa Senators	NHL	65	7	4	11	102	—	—	—	—	—
2022–23	Belleville Senators	AHL	7	1	4	5	5	—	—	—	—	—
2023–24	Ottawa Senators	NHL	63	5	5	10	63	—	—	—	—	—
2024–25	Boston Bruins	NHL	61	5	9	14	106	—	—	—	—	—
2025–26	Boston Bruins	NHL	82	12	10	22	140	6	0	1	1	11
NHL totals			287	31	30	61	425	6	0	1	1	11

=== International ===
Year	Team	Event	Result	GP	G	A	Pts	PIM
2016	United States	IH18	2nd place, silver medalist(s)	5	0	0	0	4
Junior totals				5	0	0	0	4

== Awards and honors ==
Award	Year
WHL
East Second All-Star Team	2019, 2020
