= Matthew Robertson =

Canadian ice hockey player (born 2001)

- Born: March 9, 2001 (age 25) Edmonton, Alberta, Canada
- Height: 6 ft 4 in (193 cm)
- Weight: 210 lb (95 kg; 15 st 0 lb)
- Position: Defence
- Shoots: Left
- NHL team: New York Rangers
- NHL draft: 49th overall, 2019; New York Rangers
- Playing career: 2021–present

Matthew Robertson (born March 9, 2001) is a Canadian professional ice hockey player who is a defenceman for the New York Rangers of the National Hockey League (NHL). He was selected by the Rangers in the second round (49th overall) of the 2019 NHL entry draft.

== Playing career ==
=== Junior ===
Robertson played junior ice hockey for the Edmonton Oil Kings of the Western Hockey League (WHL) from 2017 to 2021. He was selected by Edmonton in the 2016 WHL bantam draft with the seventh overall selection. He played seven games for Edmonton in the 2016–17 season where he got to be a teammate of his older brother Tyler Robertson, who played forward with the Oil Kings. In his first full season with Edmonton in 2017–18, he played in 67 games in which he recorded seven goals and 17 assists. Robertson missed six games early in Edmonton's 2018–19 season with a concussion, but ended up playing 52 games with seven goals and 26 assists.

Going into the 2019 NHL entry draft Robertson was projected by many draft analysts as a possible first round draft choice. He was ranked 26th among North American skaters by the NHL Central Scouting Bureau. He ended up being drafted by the New York Rangers in the second round with the 49th overall pick. Robertson said of being drafted "Just hearing my name get called, it's a dream I've had since a little kid. It's a surreal experience just going through it." USA Today writer Vincent Mercogliano immediately rated Robertson as the Rangers' 10th-best prospect.

Robertson returned to Edmonton for the 2019–20 season. He played 60 games recording 13 goals and 34 assists. After the season Mercogliano increased his rating to being the Rangers' seventh-best prospect. In the COVID-19 pandemic-shortened 2020–21 season, Robertson played 22 games for Edmonton, scoring at a point-per-game pace with four goals and 18 assists. Oil Kings' assistant coach Luke Pierce noticed an improvement in his play, saying "He turned a corner where he really started to buy into feedback and having an open dialogue and conversations about his game. That's where we really thought he started to takeoff." Pierce also said "He was mean. He was hard to play against. He really did start to play like a guy the size that he is with how quickly he can end plays and transition pucks." He was named a WHL Eastern Conference Second Team All-Star and Defenceman of the Year in the Eastern Conference's Central Division. Mercogliano named him the Rangers' sixth-best prospect.

=== Professional ===
Robertson played for the Rangers' minor league affiliate, the Hartford Wolf Pack of the American Hockey League (AHL), in 2021–22. He had one goal and 10 assists in 65 games. He spent some time with the Rangers on their taxi squad during the 2020–21 NHL season but did not get into any games for New York. After the season Mercogliano named him the Rangers' fourth-best prospect. Robertson said of the experience that "I learned a lot. On the defensive side – positioning, angles, just little things to be more efficient. ... On the offensive side, just getting shots through, knowing when to jump up and get into little pockets. I simplified my game." Rangers director of player development Jed Ortmeyer said "He had a great year, his first pro year, full year. He made some big strides. He played really well for us in Hartford. He's a great defenseman, he moves well and he's big. It wasn't much of an adjustment for him in pro hockey. We're excited about seeing how big of a summer he has. He got a taste of NHL playoffs being a black ace. Just a lot of momentum going forward for him."

Robertson started the 2022–23 preseason with the Rangers but was assigned to the Hartford Wolf Pack before the season began. His 2022–23 season ended after 57 games when he suffered a shoulder injury. Although he improved offensively in 2022–23, Robertson committed too many turnovers and his defensive play was sometimes inconsistent.

Prior to the 2023–24 season, Journal News writer Vincent Z. Mercogliano rated Robertson as the Rangers' 8th best prospect. Robertson started the 2023–24 season with Hartford and was recalled to the Rangers three times, although he was returned to Hartford each time without playing in a game for the Rangers. After Hartford was eliminated from the Calder Cup playoffs, Robertson was recalled to the Rangers roster for the Stanley Cup playoffs.

Prior to the 2024–25 season, Robertson received a qualifying offer from the Rangers at the end of his entry level contract despite having not yet played a game for the Rangers. During the offseason leading up to the 2024–25 season he worked with a mental skills coach to help with confidence issues that he felt had been holding his career back. McKeen's Hockey rated him as the Rangers' 8th best prospect, saying that he "excels in the defensive end as a physical, shut down type", but has limited offensive potential. Robertson started the 2024–25 season with Hartford, but was recalled to the Rangers on February 26. He was sent down before playing a game but was recalled again on April 13 and made his NHL debut for the Rangers the following day in a game against the Florida Panthers.

Robertson made the Rangers opening night roster to begin the 2025–26 season. He scored his first NHL goal on 18 October 2025 in a game against the Montreal Canadiens.

He was on the Rangers' opening night roster at the start of the 2026-27 season but lost his starting job to rookie Alberts Šmits, and after not playing in the team's first four games he was demoted to Hartford.

== International play ==
Robertson played for Canada national junior team in the 2018 Hlinka Gretzky Cup and won a gold medal while recording two goals and two assists in five games.

== Playing style ==
One of Robertson's attributes is his size, with a 6 foot, 4 inch frame. In 2019, The Hockey News writer Ryan Kennedy said that although he provides some offense "it's his hockey sense and defensive positioning that has scouts excited." After the 2019–20 season, the Edmonton Oil Kings head coach Brad Lauer said that "His strength, for me watching him play, is his ability to skate. He can skate the puck out of traffic. He can jump in on the rush and be in that second wave of attack." Chris Drury, the Rangers' assistant general manager said at the time, "We're really happy with the pick [of Robertson in the 2019 draft]. We definitely feel like he has a lot of the tools you need to have success in the NHL.

Rangers' director of player development Jed Ortmeyer said of Robertson in 2021 that "His foot in the door, I think, will potentially be that he's responsible defensively. With this skating ability and his offensive upside, that's only going to make his transition out of his own zone easier – making that first pass and being able to skate the puck out of trouble. But obviously, you've got to defend first to play in the NHL, and we think that he can do that." In 2022, Ortmeyer said "He's a big body that moves really well. He's a guy that can chew up 20, 25 minutes of ice time and just make the sound, smart play. If he uses his body and his reach, he can be a really sound defenseman." Wolf Pack's assistant coach Casey Torres said "He's got that physical presence. He does do a very good job of ending plays in the defensive zone, like that's a really good skill set for him."

In 2021, Robertson described himself as "a defenseman who tries to focus a little more on the defensive side, but loves to jump up in the play." In 2022, The Hockey News writer Tony Ferrari praised his "quick decisions, precise execution, and...solid all-around game" as well as his "passing ability on the breakout." In 2023 an NHL scout noting that Robertson had not reached the NHL as quickly as expected said "It's been slower than expected. He's 6-4 and that good of a skater, but the development has slowed. I think part of it is his injuries; part of it is his sense. I wish he would have been pigeonholed better in that defensive defenseman, big-man role."

== Career statistics ==
=== Regular season and playoffs ===
			Regular season					Playoffs
Season	Team	League	GP	G	A	Pts	PIM	GP	G	A	Pts	PIM
2016–17	Edmonton Oil Kings	WHL	7	0	1	1	2	—	—	—	—	—
2017–18	Edmonton Oil Kings	WHL	67	7	17	24	44	—	—	—	—	—
2018–19	Edmonton Oil Kings	WHL	52	7	26	33	26	16	4	4	8	10
2019–20	Edmonton Oil Kings	WHL	60	13	34	47	52	—	—	—	—	—
2020–21	Edmonton Oil Kings	WHL	22	4	18	22	22	—	—	—	—	—
2021–22	Hartford Wolf Pack	AHL	65	1	10	11	36	—	—	—	—	—
2022–23	Hartford Wolf Pack	AHL	57	5	18	23	36	—	—	—	—	—
2023–24	Hartford Wolf Pack	AHL	68	4	17	21	49	10	0	1	1	23
2024–25	Hartford Wolf Pack	AHL	60	1	24	25	55	—	—	—	—	—
2024–25	New York Rangers	NHL	2	0	0	0	0	—	—	—	—	—
2025–26	New York Rangers	NHL	72	6	12	18	38	—	—	—	—	—
NHL totals			74	6	12	18	28	—	—	—	—	—

=== International ===
Year	Team	Event	GP	G	A	Pts	PIM
2018	Canada	U18	5	0	2	2	0
Junior totals			5	0	2	2	0
