= Ian Scott (ice hockey) =

Canadian ice hockey player (born 1999)

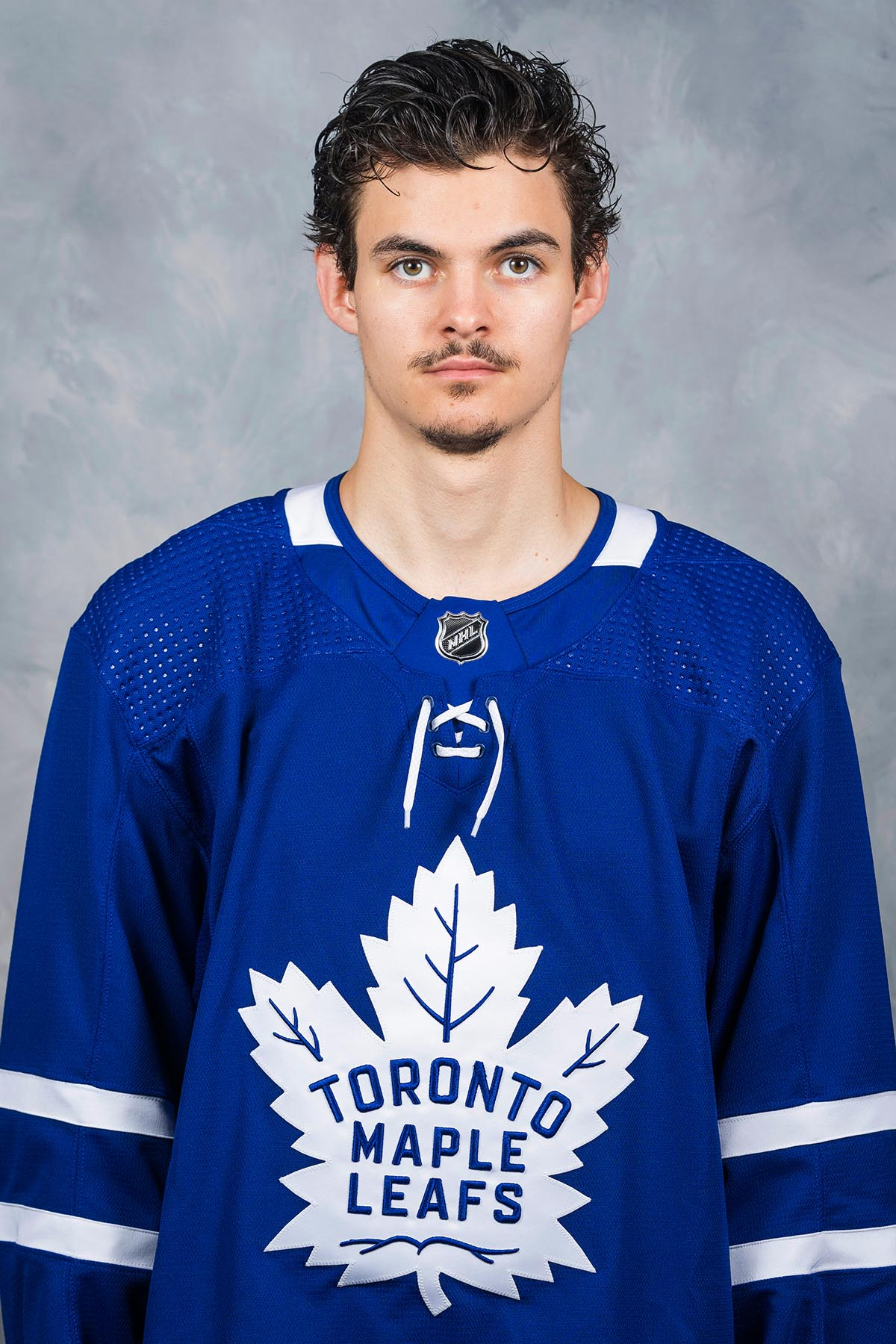
- Scott with the Toronto Maple Leafs in 2021
- Born: January 11, 1999 (age 27) Calgary, Alberta, Canada
- Height: 6 ft 3 in (191 cm)
- Weight: 178 lb (81 kg; 12 st 10 lb)
- Position: Goaltender
- Caught: Left
- Played for: Toronto Marlies
- NHL draft: 110th overall, 2017; Toronto Maple Leafs
- Playing career: 2017–2022

Ian Scott (born January 11, 1999) is a Canadian former professional ice hockey goaltender. After being drafted 110th overall by the Leafs in the 2017 NHL entry draft, Scott was named to the WHL (East) First All-Star Team and selected as CHL Goaltender of the Year.

Scott announced his retirement at 23 years old on July 21, 2022, citing multiple injuries over his past several seasons.

== Career statistics ==
| | | | Regular season | | | | | | | | | Playoffs |
| Season | Team | League | GP | W | L | OTL | MIN | GA | SO | GAA | SV% | GP | W | L | MIN | GA | SO | GAA | SV% |
|---|---|---|---|---|---|---|---|---|---|---|---|---|---|---|---|---|---|---|---|
| 2014–15 | Calgary Northstars | AMHL | 16 | 4 | 7 | 5 | — | — | 1 | 2.75 | .917 | — | — | — | — | — | — | — | — |
| 2015–16 | Prince Albert Raiders | WHL | 26 | 13 | 9 | 2 | 1316 | 71 | 1 | 3.24 | .892 | 1 | 0 | 0 | — | — | 0 | 5.52 | .800 |
| 2016–17 | Prince Albert Raiders | WHL | 50 | 12 | 31 | 3 | 2649 | 163 | 2 | 3.69 | .895 | — | — | — | — | — | — | — | — |
| 2017–18 | Prince Albert Raiders | WHL | 50 | 24 | 16 | 6 | 2865 | 148 | 0 | 3.10 | .897 | 7 | 3 | 4 | — | — | 0 | 3.25 | .897 |
| 2017–18 | Toronto Marlies | AHL | 1 | 1 | 0 | 0 | 60 | 3 | 0 | 3.00 | .909 | — | — | — | — | — | — | — | — |
| 2018–19 | Prince Albert Raiders | WHL | 49 | 38 | 8 | 3 | 2923 | 89 | 8 | 1.83 | .932 | 23 | 16 | 7 | — | — | 5 | 1.96 | .925 |
| 2020–21 | Toronto Marlies | AHL | 1 | 0 | 1 | 0 | 58 | 4 | 0 | 4.17 | .857 | — | — | — | — | — | — | — | — |
| 2020–21 | Wichita Thunder | ECHL | 5 | 0 | 1 | 0 | 101 | 7 | 0 | 4.17 | .844 | — | — | — | — | — | — | — | — |
| 2021–22 | Newfoundland Growlers | ECHL | 1 | 0 | 0 | 0 | 20 | 1 | 0 | 3.00 | .833 | — | — | — | — | — | — | — | — |
| AHL totals | | | 2 | 1 | 1 | 0 | 118 | 7 | 0 | 3.56 | .885 | — | — | — | — | — | — | — | — |

=== International ===
| Year | Team | Event | GP | W | L | T | MIN | GA | SO | GAA | SV% |
|---|---|---|---|---|---|---|---|---|---|---|---|
| 2015 | Canada White | U17 | 4 | 3 | 1 | 0 | — | — | 0 | 2.78 | .900 |
| 2016 | Canada | IH18 | 1 | — | — | — | — | — | 0 | 1.86 | .913 |
| 2017 | Canada | U18 | 4 | 2 | 2 | 0 | — | — | 0 | 4.02 | .861 |
| 2019 | Canada | WJC | 1 | 1 | 0 | 0 | — | — | 0 | 2.00 | .882 |
| Junior totals | | | 10 | 6 | 3 | 0 | — | — | 0 | 2.67 | .889 |
