= Tristen Robins =

Canadian ice hockey player

- Born: November 15, 2001 (age 24) London, England
- Height: 5 ft 10 in (178 cm)
- Weight: 176 lb (80 kg; 12 st 8 lb)
- Position: Centre
- Shoots: Right
- SHL team Former teams: IF Björklöven; San Jose Sharks; Rytíři Kladno
- NHL draft: 56th overall, 2020; San Jose Sharks
- Playing career: 2021–present

Tristen Robins (born November 15, 2001) is an English-born Canadian professional ice hockey who is a centre for IF Björklöven of the Swedish Hockey League. He was selected 56th overall in the National Hockey League (NHL) 2020 entry draft by the San Jose Sharks and made his NHL debut in 2023. He predominantly played with their minor league affiliate and was traded to the Ottawa Senators in 2025 but never played for them. He also played for Rytíři Kladno of the Czech Extraliga.

== Early life ==
Robins was born in London, England, while his father Trevor was playing minor league pro hockey for the London Knights (UK). The family moved home to Brandon, Manitoba following his father's retirement while Tristen was still an infant.

== Playing career ==
=== Amateur ===
Robins was selected in the fourth round, 76th overall, by Regina Pats of the Western Hockey League (WHL) in the 2016 WHL Bantam Draft. He appeared in one game for the Pats in the 2017–18 season, going scoreless. Robins was traded to the Saskatoon Blades on January 9, 2018 along with Dawson Davidson and a draft pick, for Libor Hájek. He made his debut for the Blades following the trade, and appeared in three games, scoring one goal. In the 2018–19 season, Robins joined the Blades and appeared in 68 games, scoring nine goals and 16 assists for 25 points. The Blades qualified for the 2019 WHL playoffs and swept the Moose Jaw Warriors in four games in their best-of-seven first round series. They faced the Prince Albert Raiders in the second round, and were eliminated in six games. In the playoffs Robins added three goals and four points in ten games. He returned to the Blades for the 2019–20 season and improved his scoring, marking 33 goals and 78 points in 62 games before the season was cancelled due to the COVID-19 pandemic on March 18, 2020.

Robins rejoined to the Blades for the pandemic-shortened 2020–21 season, in which the Blades played other Eastern Division teams in a "bubble" location in Regina, Saskatchewan. Robins finished the season with ten goals and 23 points in 16 games. In his final year of major junior hockey with Saskatoon in 2021–22, Robins was touted as "one of the very best players in our league" by the Blades general manager, Colin Priestner. He recorded 33 goals and 78 points in 62 games for the Blades and was named to the WHL's Second All-Star Team. Saskatoon qualified for the 2022 WHL playoffs and the Blades faced a rematch with Moose Jaw in the first round. Moose Jaw eliminated Saskatoon in five games.

=== Professional ===
Robins was selected by the San Jose Sharks of the National Hockey League (NHL) in the second round, 56th overall, of the 2020 NHL entry draft. Robins was signed to a three-year, entry-level contract with the Sharks on January 2, 2021. He joined San Jose's American Hockey League (AHL) affiliate, the San Jose Barracuda, in February 2021 while awaiting the return of WHL during the pandemic. He appeared in two games for the Barracuda, going scoreless, before being returned to the WHL. He was assigned to the Barracuda for the 2022–23 season. Robins played in 64 games for the Barracuda, scoring 17 goals and 38 points, finishing fifth in team scoring. He was recalled by the Sharks on April 9, 2023 along with Nikolai Knyzhov and made his NHL debut on April 10, 2023 versus the Winnipeg Jets. He appeared in three games for the Sharks, going scoreless.

He was assigned to the Barracuda for the 2023–24 season. After suffering an ankle injury in a preseason exhibition game, Robins missed 23 games, returning on December 23 against the Henderson Silver Knights. He appeared in 42 games with the Barracuda, recording 7 goals and 18 points. He attended the Sharks 2024 training camp, but failed to make the team and was assigned to the Barracuda for the 2024–25 season. He played in 41 games with the Barracuda, scoring seven goals and 18 points.

Robins was traded to the Ottawa Senators alongside Fabian Zetterlund and a 2025 fourth-round pick in exchange for Zack Ostapchuk, Noah Gregor, and a second-round pick in 2025 on March 6, 2025. Robins was assigned to Ottawa's AHL affiliate, the Belleville Senators, and remained with them for the rest of the season, appearing in 15 games, scoring one goal and six points.

==== Europe ====
In September 2025, Robins signed a contract with Rytíři Kladno of the Czech Extraliga. He made 45 appearances with Kladno, scoring 18 goals and 35 points. Kladno made the playoffs for the first time in 13 years and Robins scored the game-winning goal in game one of the opening round series against HC Sparta Praha. Kladno was eliminated by Sparta in five games. Robins tallied the one goal in the series.

In June 2026, he left the Czech Extraliga and signed with IF Björklöven of the Swedish Hockey League.

== Career statistics ==
			Regular season					Playoffs
Season	Team	League	GP	G	A	Pts	PIM	GP	G	A	Pts	PIM
2017–18	Regina Pats	WHL	1	0	0	0	0	—	—	—	—	—
2017–18	Steinbach Pistons	MJHL	1	1	0	1	0	—	—	—	—	—
2017–18	Saskatoon Blades	WHL	3	0	1	1	0	—	—	—	—	—
2018–19	Saskatoon Blades	WHL	68	9	16	25	26	10	3	1	4	0
2019–20	Saskatoon Blades	WHL	62	33	40	73	28	—	—	—	—	—
2020–21	San Jose Barracuda	AHL	2	0	0	0	0	—	—	—	—	—
2020–21	Saskatoon Blades	WHL	16	10	13	23	8	—	—	—	—	—
2021–22	Saskatoon Blades	WHL	62	33	45	78	54	3	0	1	1	2
2022–23	San Jose Barracuda	AHL	64	17	21	38	16	—	—	—	—	—
2022–23	San Jose Sharks	NHL	3	0	0	0	0	—	—	—	—	—
2023–24	San Jose Barracuda	AHL	42	7	11	18	12	—	—	—	—	—
2024–25	San Jose Barracuda	AHL	41	7	11	18	17	—	—	—	—	—
2024–25	Belleville Senators	AHL	15	1	5	6	8	—	—	—	—	—
2025–26	Rytíři Kladno	ELH	45	18	17	35	22	5	1	0	1	2
NHL totals			3	0	0	0	0	—	—	—	—	—

== Awards and honours ==
Award	Year
WHL
East Second All-Star Team	2022
