= Art Hauser Centre =

Arena in Prince Albert, Saskatchewan

Coordinates: 53°11′3″N 105°44′4″W

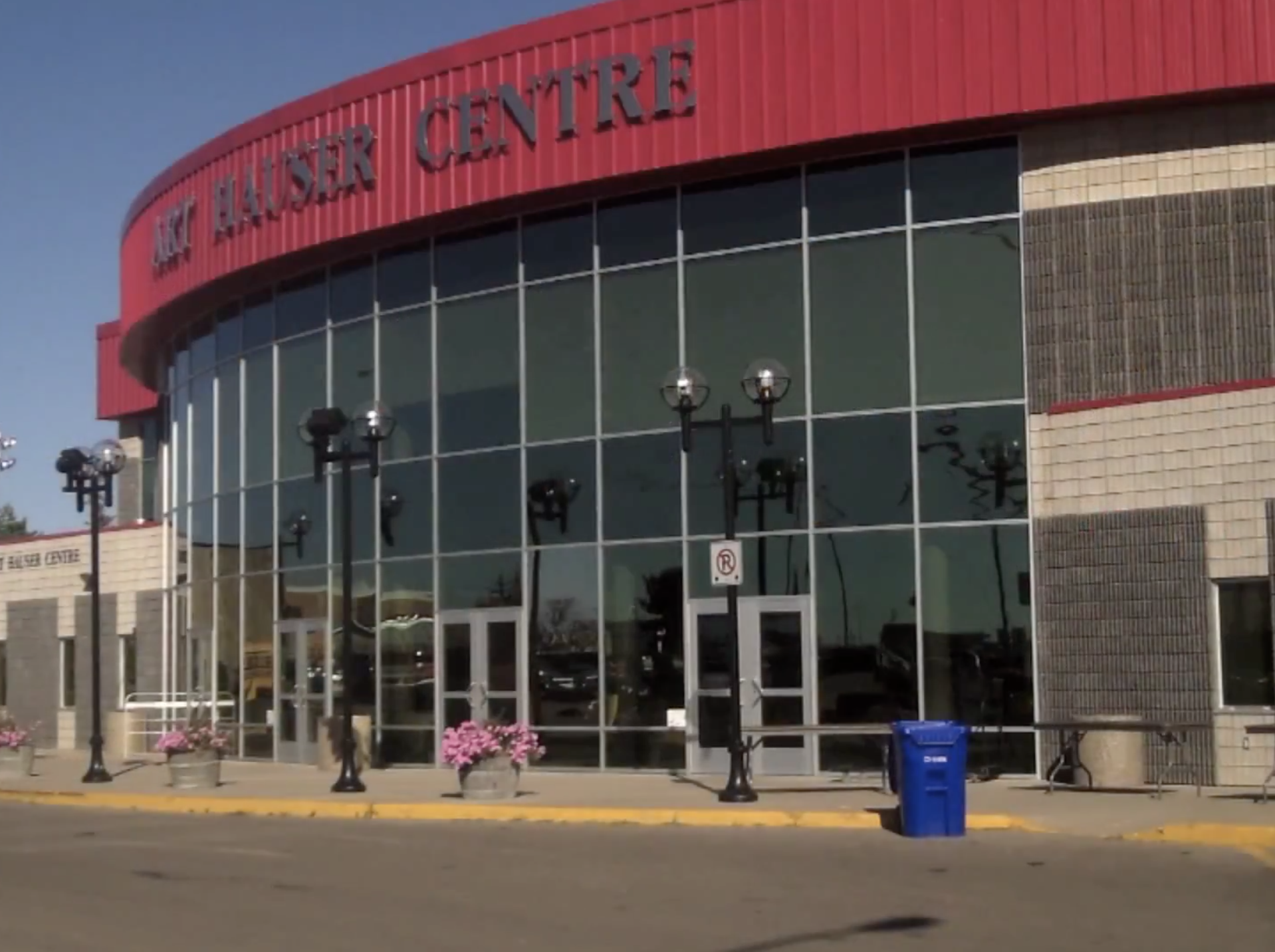

- Location within Saskatchewan Location within Canada
- Former names: Communiplex
- Location: 690 Gary Anderson Way; Prince Albert, SK S6V 2W8
- Owner: City of Prince Albert
- Operator: City of Prince Albert
- Capacity: Hockey: 2,580 (3,366 with standing room); Concerts: 3,571; Boxing: 3,071
- Surface: Multi-surface

Construction
- Groundbreaking: 1971
- Opened: December 12, 1971
- Renovated: 2005
- Expanded: 2005
- Cost: $500,000 ($3.93 million in 2025 dollars)
- Architects: Moore & Taylor Architects
- Project managers: Design Management, Ltd.

Tenants
- Prince Albert Raiders (WHL) (1971–present); Prince Albert Mintos

The Art Hauser Centre (formerly the Communiplex) is a multi-purpose arena in Prince Albert, Saskatchewan, Canada. It was built in 1971 and is home to the Prince Albert Raiders Ice hockey team in the Western Hockey League. Its hockey capacity is 2,580 seated, plus another 786 spots that are standing-room only.

The Art Hauser Centre was formerly known as the Prince Albert Communiplex, but it was renamed late in the 2004-2005 hockey season as part of the "Bring Back The Magic" campaign. This was an endeavour to raise money for extensive renovations to the Communiplex. In just under a month, the campaign raised over $3 million.

The arena was named in honour of local businessperson Art Hauser, who made a donation of $1 million to the campaign. Renovations were completed in the spring of 2006.

Changes to the arena included new concessions at the southeast corner of the building on both levels, new washrooms at the southeast corner of the building on both levels, new seats in the entire arena, renovated dressing rooms, a new centre-ice scoreboard with video boards on all 4 sides, an expanded Ches Leach Lounge, a new front lobby named for Prince Albert-born former NHL goalie Johnny Bower with concessions and team store, and new offices for both the WHL Raiders and the City of Prince Albert.
