= Alberta Major Bantam Hockey League =

The Alberta Major Bantam Hockey League (AMBHL) is the provincial Bantam AAA ice hockey league for Alberta, Canada. Established in 1990, the AMBHL operates under the jurisdiction of Hockey Alberta and Hockey Canada as an AAA-level minor ice hockey league for players under 15 years of age.

== See also ==
- List of ice hockey leagues
