= Garrett Pilon =

Canadian ice hockey player (born 1998)

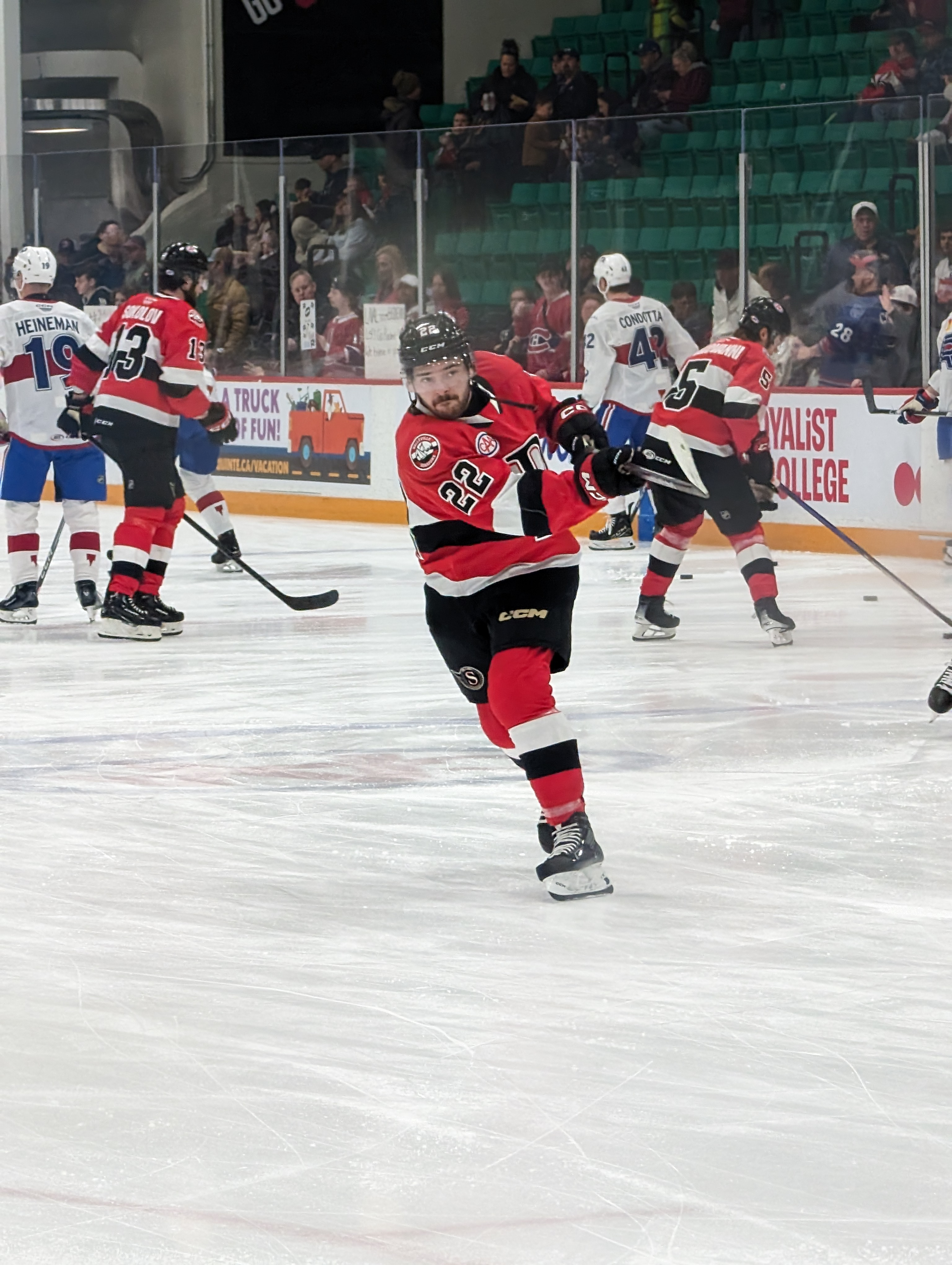
- Garrett Pilon with the Belleville Senators in 2024
- Born: April 13, 1998 (age 28) Mineola, New York, U.S.
- Height: 6 ft 0 in (183 cm)
- Weight: 190 lb (86 kg; 13 st 8 lb)
- Position: Centre
- Shoots: Right
- KHL team Former teams: Barys Astana; Washington Capitals
- NHL draft: 87th overall, 2016; Washington Capitals
- Playing career: 2018–present

Garrett Pilon (born April 13, 1998) is an American-born Canadian professional ice hockey centre for Barys Astana of the Kontinental Hockey League. He was drafted 87th overall, in the third round of the 2016 NHL entry draft by the Washington Capitals.

== Playing career ==
=== Amateur ===
Pilon played midget junior hockey with Saskatoon Contacts of the Saskatchewan Midget AAA Hockey League. He was selected by the Kamloops Blazers of the Western Hockey League (WHL) in the seventh round of the 2013 WHL Bantam Draft. He joined the Blazers ahead of the 2015–16 season and in 71 games, tallied 15 goals and 32 assists for 47 points in his rookie campaign. The Blazers advanced to the playoffs where they faced the Kelowna Rockets in the opening round. The Rockets eliminated the Blazers in the best-of-seven series, with Pilon playing in all seven games, scoring twice and recording three points. In his second season in the WHL in 2016–17, he improved his scoring, marking 20 goals and 65 points in 67 games. The Rockets made the playoffs and again faced the Rockets, this time losing in six games. In the series, Pilon scored once and recorded four points. In his third season with Kamloops in 2017–18, he posted 18 goals and 44 points in 39 games. However, on January 7, 2018, Kamloops traded Pilon along with defenseman Ondrej Vala to the Everett Silvertips for four prospects and two draft picks. He spent the rest of the season with the Silvertips, recording 16 goals and 36 points in 30 games. The Silvertips made the playoffs and advanced all the way to the league final against the Swift Current Broncos. Ultimately, the Silvertips fell to the Broncos and in 22 playoff games, Pilon added 11 goals and 18 points. He was named the WHL player of the month for April 2018.

=== Professional ===
Pilon was selected 87th overall by the Washington Capitals of the National Hockey League (NHL) in the third round of the 2016 NHL entry draft. On March 30, 2017, Pilon signed a three-year entry-level contract with the Capitals and was assigned to their American Hockey League (AHL) affiliate, the Hershey Bears. At the end of the 2017 WHL playoffs, Pilon joined the Capitals' American Hockey League (AHL) affiliate on an amateur tryout during their Calder Cup playoff run and appeared in one game, going scoreless. He was assigned to the Bears at the beginning of the 2018–19 season. In his rookie AHL campaign, he scored ten goals and 33 points in 71 games and was named the team's rookie of the year. The Bears made the playoffs and advanced to the Atlantic Division finals where they were knocked out by the Charlotte Checkers. In nine playoff games he marked five assists. Pilon returned to the AHL for the 2019–20 season and tallied 18 goals and 36 points in 61 games before the season was paused due to the COVID-19 pandemic on March 12, 2020, and then cancelled.

In the pandemic-delayed 2020–21 season, Pilon scored four goals and 12 assists over 14 games with Hershey. During the 2020–21 season, on May 8, 2021, Pilon was recalled by the Capitals and made his NHL debut against the Philadelphia Flyers. In the offseason Pilon re-signed with the Capitals to a two-year contract. In the following 2021–22 season which he began with Hershey, he was recalled after Lars Eller contracted COVID-19. At the time, he was leading the Hershey Bears in points. On November 16, Pilon scored his first career NHL goal against the Anaheim Ducks. On November 21, he was returned to Hershey having appeared in two games. He finished the season in the AHL, recording 17 goals and 42 points in 60 games. The Bears qualified for the playoffs and faced the Wilkes-Barre/Scranton Penguins in the opening round. In the best-of-three game series, which Hershey lost, Pilon put up one goal and two points. In his final season with Hershey in 2022–23, he scored 11 goals and 29 points in 53 games. He was briefly called up by the Capitals in November 2022 after the team was depleted by injuries to Beck Malenstyn and T. J. Oshie, but did not play. The Bears made the playoffs again and Pilon scored an overtime goal in game five of the 2023 Calder Cup finals (the only goal of the game) to give the Bears a 3–2 series lead against the Coachella Valley Firebirds. The Bears went on to win their 12th Calder Cup in game seven. In the playoffs, Pilon added four goals and 10 points in 20 games.

As an unrestricted free agent from the Capitals, Pilon was signed to a one-year, two-way contract with the Ottawa Senators on July 1, 2023. Pilon attended Ottawa's 2023 training camp, but was placed on waivers on September 30. After going unclaimed, he was assigned to Ottawa's AHL affiliate, the Belleville Senators, to start the 2023–24 season. Pilon played the entire season with Belleville, finishing with 18 goals and a total of 47 points in 62 games. Belleville made the playoffs and Pilon secured both the franchise's first playoff overtime game and series win when he scored in overtime to give the team a 4–3 victory over the Toronto Marlies in game three of the opening round. However, Belleville was eliminated in the following round by the Cleveland Monsters. In seven playoff games, he scored three goals and five points. He signed a two-year, two-way deal to stay with Ottawa on July 1, 2024. He was assigned to Belleville after clearing waivers ahead of the 2024–25 season. After the departure of captain Dillon Heatherington in the offseason, on October 8, 2024, Belleville named Pilon the sixth captain in franchise history. In his first season as captain, he appeared in 68 games, scoring 11 goals and 54 points. In the 2025–26 season, which was spent entirely with Belleville, he put up eight goals and 31 points in 56 games.

An unrestricted free agent at season's end, he signed a one-year contract with Barys Astana of the Kontinental Hockey League on July 1, 2026.

== Personal life ==
Pilon was born in Mineola, New York while his father, Rich, played 15 seasons in the NHL, most notably for the New York Islanders. Pilon is of Métis heritage, and grew up in Saskatoon. Pilon is married.

== Career statistics ==
			Regular season					Playoffs
Season	Team	League	GP	G	A	Pts	PIM	GP	G	A	Pts	PIM
2015–16	Kamloops Blazers	WHL	71	15	32	47	24	7	2	1	3	0
2016–17	Kamloops Blazers	WHL	67	20	45	65	20	6	1	3	4	6
2016–17	Hershey Bears	AHL	—	—	—	—	—	1	0	0	0	0
2017–18	Kamloops Blazers	WHL	39	18	26	44	34	—	—	—	—	—
2017–18	Everett Silvertips	WHL	30	16	20	36	14	22	11	17	28	8
2018–19	Hershey Bears	AHL	71	10	23	33	12	9	0	5	5	0
2019–20	Hershey Bears	AHL	61	18	18	36	17	—	—	—	—	—
2020–21	Hershey Bears	AHL	14	4	12	16	4	—	—	—	—	—
2020–21	Washington Capitals	NHL	1	0	0	0	0	—	—	—	—	—
2021–22	Hershey Bears	AHL	60	17	25	42	30	3	1	1	2	2
2021–22	Washington Capitals	NHL	2	1	0	1	0	—	—	—	—	—
2022–23	Hershey Bears	AHL	53	11	18	29	24	20	4	6	10	6
2023–24	Belleville Senators	AHL	62	18	29	47	12	7	3	2	5	4
2024–25	Belleville Senators	AHL	68	11	37	48	61	—	—	—	—	—
2025–26	Belleville Senators	AHL	56	8	23	31	8	—	—	—	—	—
NHL totals			3	1	0	1	0	—	—	—	—	—

== Awards and honours ==
Award	Year
AHL
Calder Cup	2023
