= Michael Rasmussen =

Michael Rasmussen may refer to:

- Michael Rasmussen (cyclist) (born 1974), Danish cyclist
- Michael Rasmussen (ice hockey) (born 1999), Canadian ice hockey player
