= Parker Kelly =

Canadian ice hockey player (born 1999)

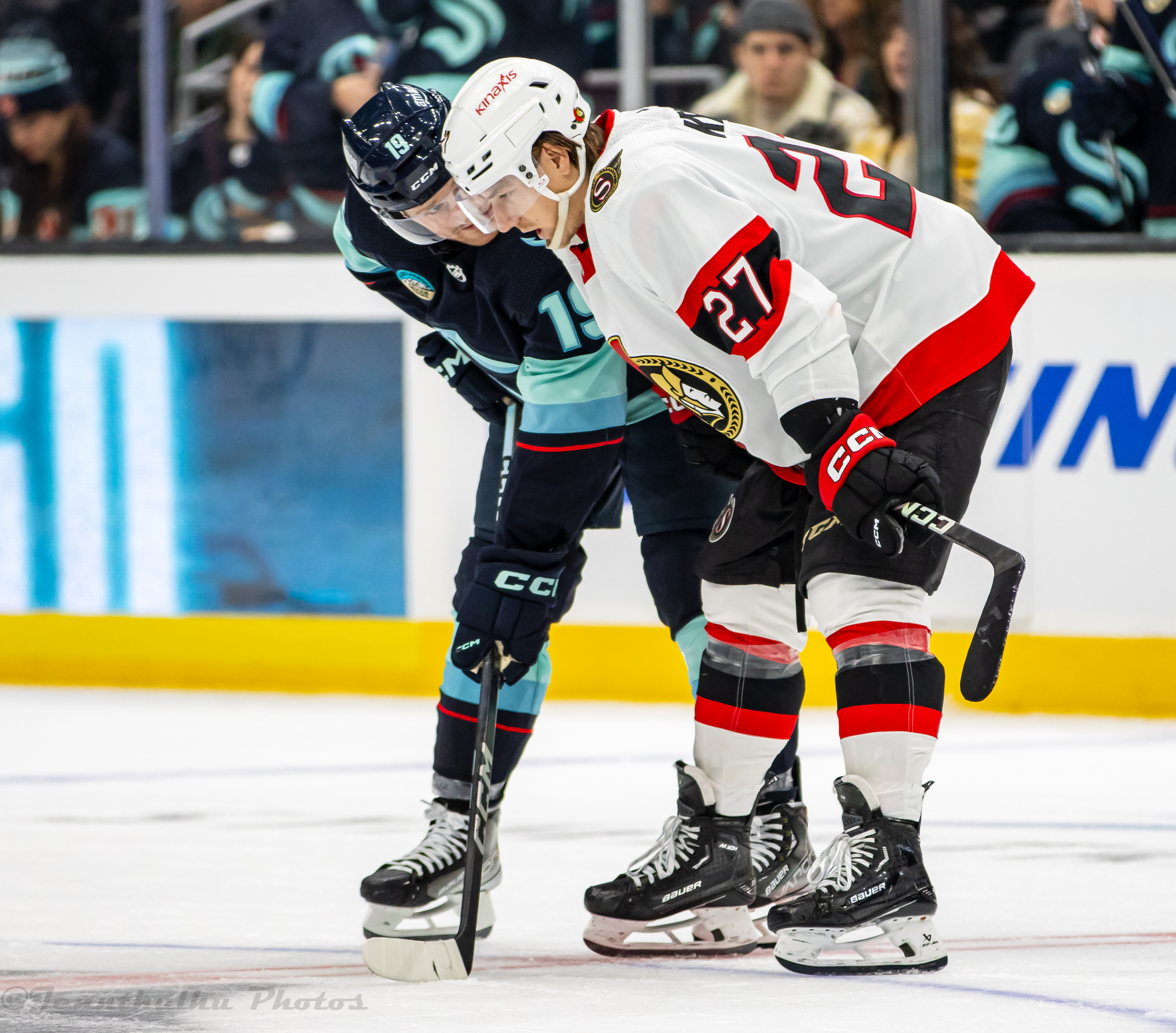
- Kelly (right) with the Ottawa Senators, alongside Jared McCann in 2024
- Born: May 14, 1999 (age 27) Camrose, Alberta, Canada
- Height: 6 ft 0 in (183 cm)
- Weight: 196 lb (89 kg; 14 st 0 lb)
- Position: Forward
- Shoots: Left
- NHL team Former teams: Colorado Avalanche; Ottawa Senators
- NHL draft: Undrafted
- Playing career: 2018–present

Parker Kelly (born May 14, 1999) is a Canadian professional ice hockey player who is a forward for the Colorado Avalanche of the National Hockey League (NHL). He previously played for the Ottawa Senators.

== Early life ==
Kelly was born on May 14, 1999, in Camrose, Alberta, Canada. His grandfather, Nicolaas Keyzer, was born in the Netherlands before moving his family to Leamington, Ontario.

== Playing career ==
=== Amateur ===
Growing up in Alberta, Kelly played Bantam AAA ice hockey with the Camrose Vikings before being drafted in the seventh round of the 2014 Western Hockey League (WHL) Bantam Draft by the Prince Albert Raiders. In his final full season with the Vikings, Kelly had recorded 58 points through 31 games. Following the draft, Kelly attended their training camp but was one of nine players to be returned to their AAA club. He then joined the Sherwood Park Kings and Camrose Kodiaks for the remainder of the 2014–15 season.

The following season, Kelly joined the Raiders for 68 games where he recorded eight goals and 11 assists for 19 points. His first career WHL goal came with nine minutes remaining in the third period of a game against the Lethbridge Hurricanes on December 15, 2015. During his rookie season, Kelly was given the moniker "Pesky Parker Kelly" due to his scrappy style of play. He finished the year with two team awards; Rookie of the Year and Scholastic Player of the Year. He returned to the Raiders for his sophomore season, where he improved his offensive output and collected 22 goals and 43 points. In spite of his success, the team failed to qualify for the 2017 WHL playoffs and ranked third-last leaguewide.

Kelly concluded his third season with the Raiders with 21 goals and 43 points in 72 games. On September 19, 2017, Kelly signed a three-year entry-level contract with the Ottawa Senators.

=== Professional ===
==== Ottawa Senators ====
After signing with the Senators organization, Kelly joined the Belleville Senators, the Senators' American Hockey League (AHL) affiliate for five games. He spent the 2018–19 season with the Raiders before joining Belleville for the 2019–20 season. Kelly scored ten goals and six assists for 16 points in 57 games. Kelly was again assigned to Belleville for the 2020–21 season. Kelly scored 18 points in 33 games with Belleville.

After the AHL season was concluded, Kelly was called up to Ottawa in May 2021. He made his NHL debut on May 12, 2021, against the Toronto Maple Leafs in the Senators' final game of the 2020–21 NHL season. He scored on his only shot in the game despite playing 7:32 minutes. Kelly remained with Ottawa following training camp at the beginning of the 2021–22 season, playing as the team's fourth-line center. On October 12, 2021, Kelly signed a two-year contract extension. He was assigned to Belleville on October 24, 2021. He was recalled on November 6 after Tyler Ennis became ill. After playing in his eleventh game with the Senators, he was reassigned to Belleville on November 28. He served as an alternate captain with Belleville. He played in 22 games with Belleville registering nine points before being recalled by Ottawa on February 8, 2022. He returned to Belleville on February 11. Kelly was brought back up to Ottawa for the fifth time on April 5 after Mathieu Joseph was injured. Kelly had spent the majority of his time in Ottawa on the fourth line, but after being called up, saw some time on Ottawa's top line with Brady Tkachuk and Josh Norris. The 2022–23 season marked Kelly's first as a regular in the NHL. He played mainly on the fourth line with Austin Watson and Dylan Gambrell. On March 23, it was announced that Kelly had suffered a broken kneecap and would be out for the remainder of the season. He finished with one goal and just four points in 55 games.

In the final year of his contract with the Senators in 2023–24, Kelly responded offensively following his lowly output the previous season, registering career highs with 8 goals and 10 assists for 18 points in 80 regular season. While primarily used in a fourth-line role, Kelly tied the team-lead with two shorthanded goals and recorded his first career tally while shorthanded in Ottawa's season-opener against the Carolina Hurricanes on October 11, 2023.

With the Senators missing the playoffs for the seventh consecutive season, Kelly as a pending restricted free agent was not tendered a qualifying offer, resulting in his release as a free agent on June 30, 2024.

==== Colorado Avalanche ====
Kelly agreed to a two-year, $1.65 million contract with the Colorado Avalanche on July 1, 2024. He made his Avalanche debut on the opening night of the 2024–25 season in a 8-4 defeat to the Vegas Golden Knights on October 9, 2024. Thrust into centering the Avalanche's fourth-line, Kelly recorded his first goal with Colorado in a multi-point effort against the Washington Capitals on November 15, 2024. Kelly demonstrated his versatility throughout the season, and after the acquisition of Jack Drury, he responded in a move to the wing by increasing his offensive output and finishing the regular season setting career-highs with 11 assists and 19 points. Kelly also matched his career-bests in goals and games played and since hits began being tracked in 2005-06, he became the third player in Avalanche history to play at least 80 games and record at least 150 hits in his first season, joining Blake Comeau and Gabriel Landeskog. He made his NHL playoff debut with Colorado, registering 1 assist through 7 games in a first-round defeat to the Dallas Stars.

After a successful debut season with the Avalanche, Kelly was signed to a four-year, $6.8 million contract extension through to 2030 on July 1, 2025. He set a new career-high for goals in a season, at 9, after scoring in a January 24, 2026 game against the Philadelphia Flyers. He scored his first playoff goal and first playoff game-winning goal during Game 4 of the Avalanche's second round series against the Minnesota Wild on May 11, 2026 during the 2026 Stanley Cup playoffs.

== Career statistics ==
			Regular season					Playoffs
Season	Team	League	GP	G	A	Pts	PIM	GP	G	A	Pts	PIM
2014–15	Camrose Kodiaks	AJHL	1	1	0	1	0	1	0	0	0	0
2015–16	Prince Albert Raiders	WHL	68	8	11	19	31	5	0	0	0	0
2016–17	Prince Albert Raiders	WHL	72	21	22	43	75	—	—	—	—	—
2017–18	Prince Albert Raiders	WHL	69	29	30	59	75	7	3	1	4	8
2017–18	Belleville Senators	AHL	5	1	0	1	0	—	—	—	—	—
2018–19	Prince Albert Raiders	WHL	64	35	32	67	54	23	8	9	17	14
2019–20	Belleville Senators	AHL	57	10	6	16	18	—	—	—	—	—
2020–21	Belleville Senators	AHL	33	10	8	18	32	—	—	—	—	—
2020–21	Ottawa Senators	NHL	1	1	0	1	0	—	—	—	—	—
2021–22	Ottawa Senators	NHL	41	7	5	12	60	—	—	—	—	—
2021–22	Belleville Senators	AHL	33	5	9	14	34	2	0	0	0	0
2022–23	Ottawa Senators	NHL	55	1	3	4	37	—	—	—	—	—
2023–24	Ottawa Senators	NHL	80	8	10	18	30	—	—	—	—	—
2024–25	Colorado Avalanche	NHL	80	8	11	19	29	7	0	1	1	18
2025–26	Colorado Avalanche	NHL	82	21	14	35	30	13	2	2	4	8
NHL totals			339	46	43	89	186	20	2	3	5	26
