= Martin Faško-Rudáš =

Slovak ice hockey player

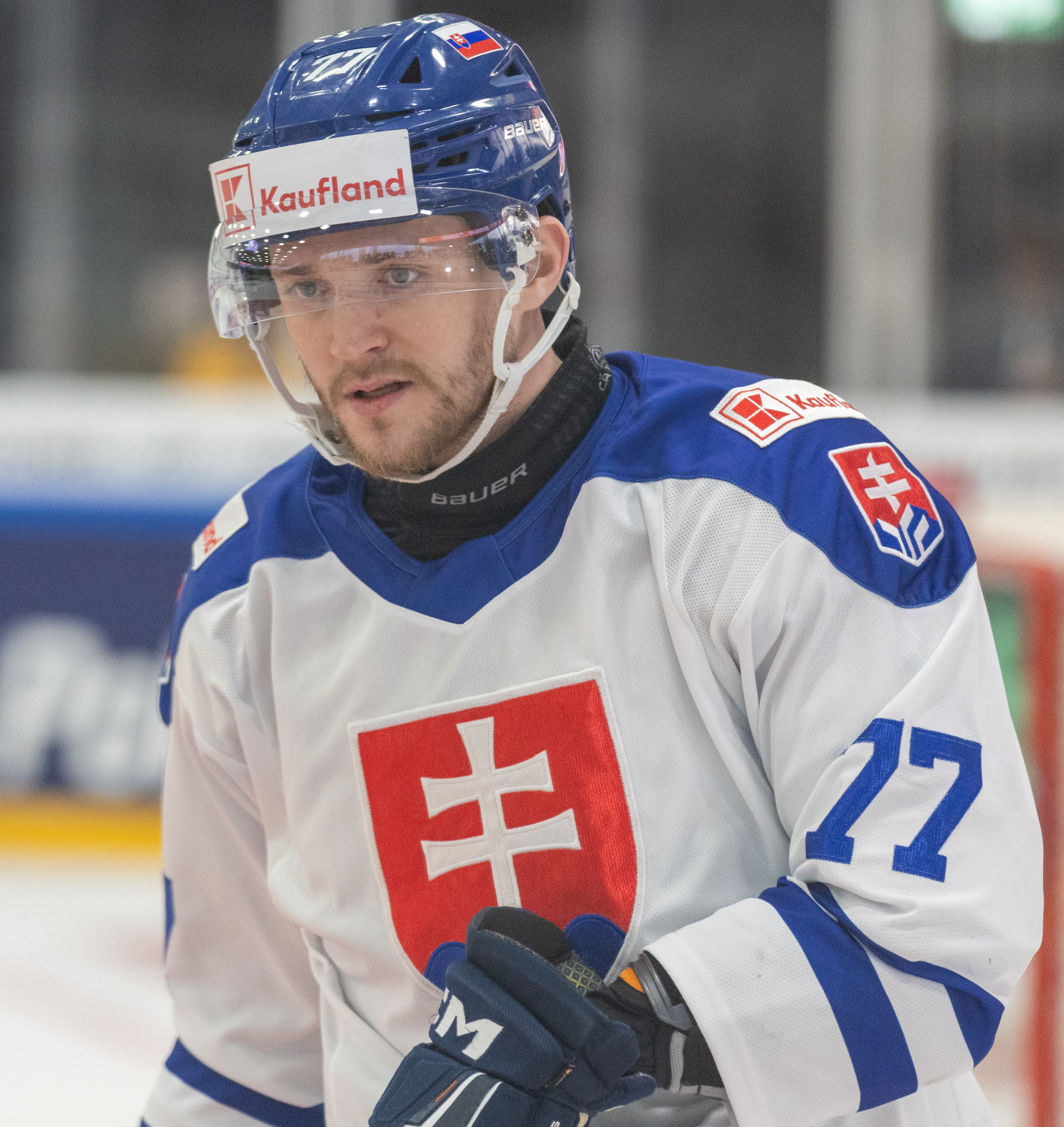
- Faško-Rudáš in 2026
- Born: 10 August 2000 (age 25) Banská Bystrica, Slovakia
- Height: 6 ft 0 in (183 cm)
- Weight: 172 lb (78 kg; 12 st 4 lb)
- Position: Right wing
- Shoots: Right
- ELH team Former teams: HC Bílí Tygři Liberec; HC ’05 Banská Bystrica
- National team: Slovakia
- NHL draft: Undrafted
- Playing career: 2017–present

Martin Faško-Rudáš (born 10 August 2000) is a Slovak professional ice hockey player who is a right winger for HC Bílí Tygři Liberec of the Czech Extraliga (ELH).

== International play ==
He was selected to make his full IIHF international debut, participating for Slovakia in the 2021 IIHF World Championship.

== Career statistics ==
=== Regular season and playoffs ===
			Regular season					Playoffs
Season	Team	League	GP	G	A	Pts	PIM	GP	G	A	Pts	PIM
2016–17	Team Slovakia U18	Slovak-Jr.	31	8	7	15	41	—	—	—	—	—
2016–17	HK Dukla Trenčín	Slovak-Jr.	2	1	3	4	0	9	1	5	6	0
2017–18	Everett Silvertips	WHL	70	6	9	15	22	20	5	3	8	4
2018–19	Everett Silvertips	WHL	60	15	16	31	34	10	4	5	9	6
2019–20	Everett Silvertips	WHL	17	4	4	8	8	—	—	—	—	—
2019–20	Saskatoon Blades	WHL	23	10	8	18	2	—	—	—	—	—
2020–21	HC '05 Banská Bystrica	Slovak	48	15	23	38	20	4	2	1	3	4
2021–22	Bílí Tygři Liberec	ELH	50	3	7	10	16	9	1	0	1	2
2021–22	HC Benátky nad Jizerou	Czech.1	7	1	5	6	4	—	—	—	—	—
2022–23	Bílí Tygři Liberec	ELH	51	10	8	18	22	5	0	0	0	0
2023–24	Bílí Tygři Liberec	ELH	48	13	10	23	18	9	2	2	4	0
2024–25	Bílí Tygři Liberec	ELH	51	10	12	22	22	5	0	0	0	4
Slovak totals			48	15	23	38	20	4	2	1	3	4
ELH totals			200	36	37	73	78	28	3	2	5	6

=== International ===
Year	Team	Event	Result	GP	G	A	Pts	PIM
2020	Slovakia	WJC	8th	5	1	1	2	4
2021	Slovakia	WC	8th	4	0	1	1	0
2024	Slovakia	WC	7th	5	1	1	2	0
2026	Slovakia	WC	9th	7	1	3	4	0
Junior totals				5	1	1	2	4
Senior totals				16	2	5	7	0
