= Jayden Halbgewachs =

Canadian ice hockey player (born 1997)

- Born: March 22, 1997 (age 29) Regina, Saskatchewan, Canada
- Height: 5 ft 8 in (173 cm)
- Weight: 161 lb (73 kg; 11 st 7 lb)
- Position: Left wing
- Shoots: Left
- SL team Former teams: HC Sierre; San Jose Sharks; Växjö Lakers; Frölunda HC; Kunlun Red Star
- NHL draft: Undrafted
- Playing career: 2018–present

Jayden Halbgewachs (born March 22, 1997) is a Canadian professional ice hockey forward who currently plays for HC Sierre of the Swiss League (SL). He formerly played for the San Jose Sharks of the National Hockey League (NHL).

== Early life ==
Halbgewachs was born on March 22, 1997, in Regina, Saskatchewan, to father Jamie. He grew up as the middle of two other brothers, Taylor and Brandon.

== Playing career ==
=== Amateur ===
Growing up in Emerald Park, Saskatchewan, Halbgewachs played bantam AA ice hockey for the Prairie Storm before being drafted in the 2012 Western Hockey League (WHL) Draft by the Kamloops Blazers. In his last season of bantam AA, Halbgewachs recorded 89 points, including 55 goals, in 24 games. During this time, he also attended Greenall School and said his favourite subject was mathematics. Although Halbgewachs signed his WHL contract with the Blazers, he was traded to the Moose Jaw Warriors before playing his first major junior hockey game.

Halbgewachs experienced a breakout season during his 2017–18 campaign and gained attention from NHL teams. After going undrafted in the 2017 NHL entry draft, Halbgewachs signed an entry-level contract with the San Jose Sharks on December 28, 2017. At the time of his signing, he had recorded 61 points in 36 games and led all Canadian junior players in goals. Halbgewachs concluded the season with 70 goals in 72 games, becoming the first WHL player to reach the 70-goal plateau since Pavel Brendl during the 1998–99 season. As a result of his 129 overall points, which helped the Moose Jaw claim the WHL Regular Season title, he was recognized as the CHL's CCM Top Scorer. He was also named to the WHL Eastern Conference First All-Star Team.

=== Professional ===
Halbgewachs began his first professional season with the San Jose Sharks organization during the 2018–19 season. While attending the Sharks' 2018 training camp, he said his goal was to "continue to grow and prove myself each and every day and I think good things will happen." He was re-assigned to the Sharks' American Hockey League (AHL) team, the San Jose Barracuda, to begin the season and he subsequently spent his entire rookie campaign with the team. Halbgewachs recorded his first professional goal on October 6 in a 5–1 win over the Bakersfield Condors. By the end of October, he was tied for co-leader on the team in goals and points.

After concluding the 2019–20 season with 35 points in 55 games, Halbgewachs signed a two-year contract extension with the Sharks on October 6, 2020. After attending the Sharks' training camp prior to the shortened 2020–21 season, Halbgewachs was re-assigned to the Barracuda to begin the season. After recording four goals in 17 games, he was called up the Sharks' taxi squad. He made his NHL debut on December 17, 2021, in a 2–5 loss to the Vancouver Canucks. His first point, as assist, came on December 28, 2021, in 8–7 shootout victory over the Arizona Coyotes. In the 2022 offseason, he signed for Swedish team Växjö Lakers.

As a free agent following two seasons in Sweden, Halbgewachs signed a contract with Chinese club, Kunlun Red Star of the KHL, on June 15, 2024.

== Career statistics ==
=== Regular season and playoffs ===
			Regular season					Playoffs
Season	Team	League	GP	G	A	Pts	PIM	GP	G	A	Pts	PIM
2012–13	Regina Pat Canadians	SMAAAHL	42	13	23	36	8	8	1	1	2	4
2012–13	Moose Jaw Warriors	WHL	1	0	0	0	8	—	—	—	—	—
2013–14	Regina Pat Canadians	SMAAAHL	42	28	38	66	12	9	6	4	10	2
2013–14	Moose Jaw Warriors	WHL	4	0	1	1	0	—	—	—	—	—
2014–15	Moose Jaw Warriors	WHL	59	4	4	8	6	—	—	—	—	—
2015–16	Moose Jaw Warriors	WHL	69	15	26	41	4	10	9	6	15	4
2016–17	Moose Jaw Warriors	WHL	71	50	51	101	27	7	1	2	3	0
2017–18	Moose Jaw Warriors	WHL	72	70	59	129	12	14	4	4	8	6
2018–19	San Jose Barracuda	AHL	64	13	22	35	20	4	1	1	2	0
2019–20	San Jose Barracuda	AHL	55	19	16	35	18	—	—	—	—	—
2020–21	San Jose Barracuda	AHL	25	6	5	11	4	4	1	2	3	2
2021–22	San Jose Barracuda	AHL	59	17	24	41	10	—	—	—	—	—
2021–22	San Jose Sharks	NHL	3	0	1	1	4	—	—	—	—	—
2022–23	Växjö Lakers	SHL	52	10	10	20	10	17	2	2	4	2
2023–24	Milestone Flyers	QVHHL	3	4	4	8	4	—	—	—	—	—
2023–24	Frölunda HC	SHL	11	3	3	6	0	14	1	5	6	8
2024–25	Kunlun Red Star	KHL	61	8	11	19	15	—	—	—	—	—
NHL totals			3	0	1	1	4	—	—	—	—	—
SHL totals			63	13	13	26	10	31	3	7	10	10

=== International ===
Year	Team	Event	Result	GP	G	A	Pts	PIM
2014	Canada Western	U17	9th	5	1	0	1	0
Junior totals				5	1	0	1	0

== Awards and honours ==
Award	Year
WHL
East Second All-Star Team	2017
East First All-Star Team	2018
Bobby Clarke Trophy	2018
CHL Top Scorer Award	2018
SHL
Le Mat Trophy champion	2023
