= Matthew Phillips (ice hockey) =

Canadian ice hockey player (born 1998)

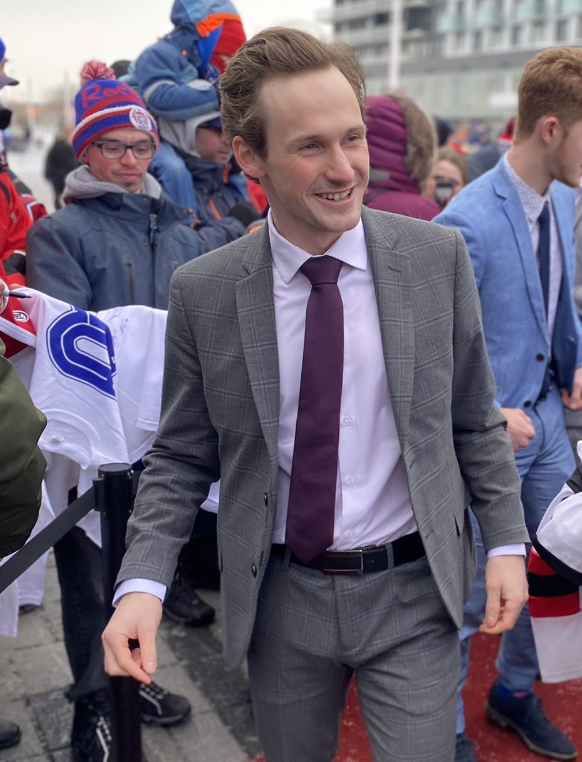
- Phillips at the 2023 AHL All-Star Classic
- Born: April 6, 1998 (age 28) Calgary, Alberta, Canada
- Height: 5 ft 8 in (173 cm)
- Weight: 160 lb (73 kg; 11 st 6 lb)
- Position: Right wing
- Shoots: Right
- AHL team Former teams: San Diego Gulls; Calgary Flames; Washington Capitals; Pittsburgh Penguins
- NHL draft: 166th overall, 2016; Calgary Flames
- Playing career: 2017–present

Matthew Phillips (born April 6, 1998) is a Canadian professional ice hockey right wing who is currently playing with the San Diego Gulls in the American Hockey League (AHL). He was selected by the Calgary Flames, 166th overall, in the 2016 NHL entry draft.

== Playing career ==
=== Junior ===
Phillips was drafted in the second round, 33rd overall by the Victoria Royals in the 2013 WHL Bantam Draft. The season prior to being drafted, Phillips scored forty goals and 77 points in 37 games played with the Calgary Bisons of the Alberta Major Bantam Hockey League (AMBHL). Phillips participated in the Royals' training camp and preseason for the 2013–14 WHL season as a 15-year old, despite not being eligible to play in the regular season, as WHL rules prevent players under the age of 16 from playing. He was subsequently returned to his minor ice hockey team, the Alberta Midget Hockey League (AMHL) Calgary Buffaloes, where he finished the season with fifteen goals and 35 points in 33 games played.

Phillips joined the Royals' training camp and preseason for the 2014–15 WHL season, but was again returned to his minor ice hockey team in Calgary. Playing with the AMHL Calgary Buffaloes for the second straight season, Phillips was leading the league in scoring when he was called up to the Royals. Phillips made his Western Hockey League debut for the Royals on January 23, 2015, against the Kamloops Blazers, scoring one goal in a 4–3 overtime loss. He played one more game during the 2014–15 WHL season, finishing with three points in two games played, before being returned to the Buffaloes. He finished his second season with the Buffaloes winning the Harry Allen Memorial Trophy as the top scorer in the AMHL with 33 goals and 73 points in 34 games played. He also won the Trevor Linden Trophy as the league's top forward and was named to the AMHL First All-Star Team.

=== Professional ===
On December 31, 2017, Phillips signed a three-year, $2.325 million entry-level contract with the Calgary Flames. Philips made his National Hockey League debut with the Flames on May 19, 2021, against the Vancouver Canucks, finishing the game with two shots on goal in 14:19 of ice time in a 6–2 victory.

On August 8, 2021, Phillips signed a one-year, two-way contract extension with the Flames worth $750,000 at the NHL level. During the 2021–22 season with the Stockton Heat, the Flames' American Hockey League affiliate, Phillips became the Heat's franchise leader in career goals and points.

On July 23, 2022, Phillips signed another one-year, two-way contract extension with the Flames worth $750,000 at the NHL level.

Phillips would spend the majority of the 2022–23 season with the Flames affiliate the Calgary Wranglers, where he led the team in goals and points. On December 8, 2022, Phillips was called up to the Calgary Flames, where he would play in two games before being reassigned to the Wranglers. Phillips would enjoy significant success during the season, including being named AHL player of the month for November 2022, being named to the AHL All-Star Classic along with teammate Dustin Wolf and coach Mitch Love, and being named to the AHL First All-Star team along with Wolf.

On July 2, 2023, Phillips as a free agent from the Flames signed a one-year, one-way contract worth $775,000 with the Washington Capitals, joining former coach Mitch Love for the 2023–24 season. He scored his first career NHL goal and added an assist in his first game against his former team on October 16. After contributing with 3 points through his first five appearances with the Capitals, Phillips was unable to cement a forward role, resulting in reduced minutes through 27 games. On February 16, 2024, after Phillips was claimed off waivers from the Capitals by the Pittsburgh Penguins. He made his debut with the Penguins in a 2-1 defeat to the Los Angeles Kings on February 18, 2024. Phillips was scoreless through just 3 games with the Penguins before he was returned on waivers and re-claimed by the Washington Capitals on March 6, 2024. He was immediately re-assigned to AHL affiliate, the Hershey Bears, finishing with 6 points through 9 regular season games, while adding one further appearance in the NHL. Remaining with Hershey through the 2024 Calder Cup playoffs, Phillips was sparingly used in 6 post-season games as the Bears defended the Calder Cup.

Leaving the Capitals as a free agent, Phillips was later signed through the summer to a one-year, two-way contract with the Colorado Avalanche on August 9, 2024. After attending the Avalanche's 2024 training camp, Phillips was re-assigned to AHL affiliate, the Colorado Eagles for the 2024–25 season. Assuming a top-line forward role, Phillips led the Colorado Eagles in points, collecting 18 goals and 39 assists for 57 points. Among Eagles skaters, he ranked second in assists, tied for third in +/- rating and fifth in goals. His 57 point campaign marked his third AHL season with 55 plus points in his last four seasons. Helping the Eagles claim the Pacific Division title, Phillips also tallied 8 points in 9 Calder Cup Playoff appearances.

At the conclusion of his contract with the Avalanche, Phillips opted to continue his career in the minor leagues, signing a two-year AHL contract with fellow Pacific Division club, the San Diego Gulls, on July 2, 2025.

== Career statistics ==
			Regular season					Playoffs
Season	Team	League	GP	G	A	Pts	PIM	GP	G	A	Pts	PIM
2014–15	Victoria Royals	WHL	2	1	2	3	0	—	—	—	—	—
2015–16	Victoria Royals	WHL	72	37	39	76	16	13	5	3	8	2
2016–17	Victoria Royals	WHL	70	50	40	90	50	6	1	2	3	2
2016–17	Stockton Heat	AHL	1	0	1	1	0	2	0	0	0	2
2017–18	Victoria Royals	WHL	71	48	64	112	32	11	6	13	19	6
2018–19	Stockton Heat	AHL	65	13	25	38	2	—	—	—	—	—
2019–20	Stockton Heat	AHL	38	15	18	33	6	—	—	—	—	—
2020–21	Stockton Heat	AHL	30	8	13	21	6	—	—	—	—	—
2020–21	Calgary Flames	NHL	1	0	0	0	0	—	—	—	—	—
2021–22	Stockton Heat	AHL	65	31	37	68	16	13	3	5	8	4
2022–23	Calgary Flames	NHL	2	0	0	0	2	—	—	—	—	—
2022–23	Calgary Wranglers	AHL	66	36	40	76	12	9	1	6	7	15
2023–24	Washington Capitals	NHL	28	1	4	5	0	—	—	—	—	—
2023–24	Pittsburgh Penguins	NHL	3	0	0	0	0	—	—	—	—	—
2023–24	Hershey Bears	AHL	9	3	3	6	2	6	0	0	0	0
2024–25	Colorado Eagles	AHL	65	18	39	57	8	9	1	7	8	0
2025–26	San Diego Gulls	AHL	71	16	36	52	18	2	0	0	0	0
NHL totals			34	1	4	5	2	—	—	—	—	—

== Awards and honours ==
Award	Year	Ref
AMHL
Harry Allen Memorial Trophy (AMHL Top Scorer)	2015	
Trevor Linden Trophy (AMHL Top Forward)	2015	
AMHL First All-Star Team	2015	
WHL
Jim Piggott Memorial Trophy (WHL Rookie of the Year)	2016	
WHL Western Conference First All-Star Team	2017, 2018	
AHL
First All-Star Team	2023	
Calder Cup	2024	
