= Rich Pilon =

Canadian ice hockey player (born 1968)

- Born: April 30, 1968 (age 58) Saskatoon, Saskatchewan, Canada
- Height: 6 ft 0 in (183 cm)
- Weight: 216 lb (98 kg; 15 st 6 lb)
- Position: Defence
- Shot: Left
- Played for: New York Islanders; New York Rangers; St. Louis Blues
- NHL draft: 143rd overall, 1986; New York Islanders
- Playing career: 1988–2001

Richard Brian Pilon (born April 30, 1968) is a Canadian former professional ice hockey player of Métis heritage. He was drafted 143rd overall in the 1986 NHL entry draft by the New York Islanders. Playing as a defenceman, Pilon played for the Islanders, New York Rangers and St. Louis Blues during his 15-year NHL career. He is the former coach of the Weyburn Red Wings of The SJHL.

== Playing career ==
Pilon was born in Saskatoon, Saskatchewan. He made his debut in the 1988–89 season, playing 62 games, recording 14 assists and 242 penalty minutes for the New York Islanders as a left shooting defenseman. He would play 10 seasons for the Islanders before being put on waivers by the team. He was then picked up on December 1, 1999, by the New York Rangers. Due to injury, he played parts of two seasons for the Rangers, before he was traded to the San Jose Sharks for a seventh round draft pick, days before he became an unrestricted free agent in 2001. He was then signed by the St. Louis Blues on July 10, 2001. He played eight games for the Blues before he suffered a broken left wrist in a game against the Rangers that subsequently ended his NHL career.

=== The Kevin Stevens incident ===
On May 14, 1993, game seven of the Patrick Division finals between the New York Islanders and the favored defending Stanley Cup champion Pittsburgh Penguins saw not only one of the greatest upsets in NHL playoff history (with Islanders' overtime goal by David Volek), but one of the worst freak accidents to ever occur on the ice.

Early in the first period, the puck went into the Islanders' corner. The Penguins' star power forward, Kevin Stevens, skated in hard and attempted to hit Pilon who was battling for the puck, but instead was met by Pilon's visor which knocked Stevens unconscious in mid-air. The unprotected fall left Stevens to smash his face on the ice upon impact. Stevens lay motionless on the ice for several seconds, a pool of blood forming around his head, before the team trainer attended to him. Stevens was carted off the ice in a stretcher with a neck brace. He required immediate surgery on his crushed face to repair injuries that ended up being a broken sinus bone and nose, as well as many facial lacerations and bruises. Stevens' face required over one-hundred stitches that left him unrecognizable, even to his own family, for the next few weeks until the swelling went down. Fortunately for Stevens, the injury did not end his career, and he played 10 more seasons in the NHL.

== PPG Paints Arena statue ==
Pilon and Jeff Norton are depicted as the two defenders Mario Lemieux skates between in a 4,700-pound bronze statue unveiled on March 7, 2012, at PPG Paints Arena (then called Consol Energy Center) in Pittsburgh, Pennsylvania.

== Personal life ==
Pilon was born in Saskatoon, but grew up in St. Louis, Saskatchewan. His son Garrett was drafted by the Washington Capitals in the third round of the 2016 NHL entry draft.

Pilon runs a horse-drawn carriage business and received approval from Saskatoon City Council for a temporary permit to operate within city limits in December 2025.

== Career statistics ==
=== Regular season and playoffs ===
			Regular season					Playoffs
Season	Team	League	GP	G	A	Pts	PIM	GP	G	A	Pts	PIM
1985-86	Prince Albert Raiders	WHL	6	0	0	0	0	5	0	1	1	10
1986–87	Prince Albert Raiders	WHL	68	4	21	25	192	7	1	6	7	17
1987–88	Prince Albert Raiders	WHL	65	13	34	47	177	9	0	6	6	38
1988-89	New York Islanders	NHL	62	0	14	14	272	—	—	—	—	—
1989–90	New York Islanders	NHL	14	0	2	2	31	—	—	—	—	—
1990–91	New York Islanders	NHL	60	1	4	5	126	—	—	—	—	—
1991–92	New York Islanders	NHL	65	1	6	7	183	—	—	—	—	—
1992–93	New York Islanders	NHL	44	1	3	4	194	15	0	0	0	50
1992–93	Capital District Islanders	AHL	6	0	1	1	8	—	—	—	—	—
1993–94	New York Islanders	NHL	28	1	4	5	75	—	—	—	—	—
1993–94	Salt Lake Golden Eagles	IHL	2	0	0	0	8	—	—	—	—	—
1994–95	New York Islanders	NHL	20	1	1	2	40	—	—	—	—	—
1995–96	New York Islanders	NHL	27	0	3	3	72	—	—	—	—	—
1996–97	New York Islanders	NHL	52	1	4	5	179	—	—	—	—	—
1997–98	New York Islanders	NHL	76	0	7	7	291	—	—	—	—	—
1998–99	New York Islanders	NHL	52	0	4	4	88	—	—	—	—	—
1999–00	New York Islanders	NHL	9	0	2	2	34	—	—	—	—	—
1999–00	New York Rangers	NHL	45	0	4	4	36	—	—	—	—	—
2000–01	New York Rangers	NHL	69	2	9	11	175	—	—	—	—	—
2001–02	St. Louis Blues	NHL	8	0	2	2	9	—	—	—	—	—
NHL totals			631	8	69	77	1745	15	0	0	0	50

== Awards ==
- Bob Nystrom Award – 1997
- WHL East Second All-Star Team – 1988
