= 2017–18 WHL season =

52nd season of the Western Hockey League

- League: Western Hockey League
- Sport: Ice hockey
- Duration: Regular season September 22, 2017 – March 18, 2018; Playoffs; March 22, 2018 – May 13, 2018
- Teams: 22
- TV partner(s): CW 32, JOEtv, Rogers Sportsnet

Regular season
- Scotty Munro Memorial Trophy: Moose Jaw Warriors (1)
- Season MVP: Carter Hart (Everett Silvertips)
- Top scorer: Jayden Halbgewachs (Moose Jaw Warriors)

Playoffs
- Playoffs MVP: Glenn Gawdin (Broncos)
- Finals champions: Swift Current Broncos (3)
- Runners-up: Everett Silvertips

WHL seasons
- 2016–17 2018–19

2017–18 CHL seasons
- League: Canadian Hockey League
- Sport: Hockey
- Duration: OHL; September 2017 – March 2018; QMJHL; September 2017 – March 2018; WHL; September 2017 – March 2018
- Teams: 60
- TV partner(s): TVA Sports, Rogers Sportsnet, Rogers TV, Shaw TV
- Season MVP: Alex Barré-Boulet (Blainville-Boisbriand Armada) (QMJHL)
- Top scorer: Jayden Halbgewachs (Swift Current Broncos) (WHL)

Memorial Cup
- Finals champions: Acadie-Bathurst Titan (QMJHL) (1st title)
- Runners-up: Regina Pats (WHL)

The 2017–18 WHL season was the 52nd season of the Western Hockey League (WHL). The regular season began on September 22, 2017, and ended on March 18, 2018. The Moose Jaw Warriors finished the season with the league's best record. The playoffs began on March 22, 2018, and ended on May 13; the winning team, the Swift Current Broncos, were awarded the Ed Chynoweth Cup and a berth in the 2018 Memorial Cup tournament, held at the Brandt Centre in Regina, Saskatchewan from May 18 to 27, 2018. The Regina Pats automatically qualified for the tournament as hosts.

== Standings ==
Map of WHL, 2011–12 to 2018–19
East Division
Central Division
BC Division
US Division

Updated to game(s) played on March 18, 2018. Source: Western Hockey League

East division: Top 3
Pos	Team	Pld	W	L	OTL	SOL	GF	GA	Pts
1	x, y, z – Moose Jaw Warriors	72	52	15	2	3	326	216	109
2	x – Swift Current Broncos	72	48	17	5	2	284	213	103
3	x – Regina Pats	72	40	25	6	1	245	235	87

x – clinched playoff berth; y – clinched division title; z – clinched conference title

Central division: Top 3
Pos	Team	Pld	W	L	OTL	SOL	GF	GA	Pts
1	x, y – Medicine Hat Tigers	72	36	28	8	0	260	252	80
2	x – Lethbridge Hurricanes	72	33	33	6	0	244	260	72
3	x – Red Deer Rebels	72	27	32	10	3	209	250	67

x – clinched playoff berth; y – clinched division title

Eastern conference wild card: Top 2 qualify for playoffs
Pos	Div	Team	Pld	W	L	OTL	SOL	GF	GA	Pts
1	East	x – Brandon Wheat Kings	72	40	27	3	2	272	255	85
2	East	x – Prince Albert Raiders	72	32	27	9	4	245	250	77
3	East	Saskatoon Blades	72	35	33	3	1	237	276	74
4	Cen.	Kootenay Ice	72	27	38	5	2	215	275	61
5	Cen.	Calgary Hitmen	72	24	37	9	2	226	276	59
6	Cen.	Edmonton Oil Kings	72	22	42	6	2	204	315	52

x – clinched playoff berth

U.S. division: Top 3
Pos	Team	Pld	W	L	OTL	SOL	GF	GA	Pts
1	x, y – Everett Silvertips	72	47	20	2	3	246	167	99
2	x – Portland Winterhawks	72	44	22	1	5	274	214	94
3	x – Spokane Chiefs	72	41	25	3	3	282	240	88

x – clinched playoff berth; y – clinched division title

B.C. division: Top 3
Pos	Team	Pld	W	L	OTL	SOL	GF	GA	Pts
1	x, y – Kelowna Rockets	72	43	22	5	2	280	249	93
2	x – Victoria Royals	72	39	27	4	2	287	264	84
3	x – Vancouver Giants	72	36	27	6	3	233	257	81

x – clinched playoff berth; y – clinched division title

Western conference wild card: Top 2 qualify for playoffs
Pos	Div	Team	Pld	W	L	OTL	SOL	GF	GA	Pts
1	U.S.	x – Tri-City Americans	72	38	25	8	1	255	249	85
2	U.S.	x – Seattle Thunderbirds	72	34	28	8	2	250	258	78
3	B.C.	Kamloops Blazers	72	30	37	1	4	212	237	65
4	B.C.	Prince George Cougars	72	24	38	5	5	217	295	58

x – clinched playoff berth

== Statistical leaders ==
=== Scoring leaders ===
Players are listed by points, then goals.

Note: GP = Games played; G = Goals; A = Assists; Pts. = Points; PIM = Penalty minutes

Player	Team	GP	G	A	Pts	PIM
Jayden Halbgewachs	Moose Jaw Warriors	72	70	59	129	12
Glenn Gawdin	Swift Current Broncos	67	56	69	125	101
Aleksi Heponiemi	Swift Current Broncos	57	28	90	118	28
Brayden Burke	Moose Jaw Warriors	61	31	82	113	45
Matthew Phillips	Victoria Royals	71	48	64	112	32
Tyler Steenbergen	Swift Current Broncos	56	47	55	102	44
Cody Glass	Portland Winterhawks	64	37	65	102	26
Ty Lewis	Brandon Wheat Kings	70	44	56	100	60
Patrick Bajkov	Everett Silvertips	72	33	67	100	56
Justin Almeida	Moose Jaw Warriors	72	43	55	98	10

=== Leading goaltenders ===
These are the goaltenders that lead the league in GAA that played at least 1800 minutes.

Note: GP = Games played; Mins = Minutes played; W = Wins; L = Losses; OTL = Overtime losses; SOL = Shootout losses; SO = Shutouts; GAA = Goals against average; Sv% = Save percentage

Player	Team	GP	Mins	W	L	OTL	SOL	SO	GAA	Sv%
Carter Hart	Everett Silvertips	41	2437	31	6	1	3	7	1.60	.947
Cole Kehler	Portland Winterhawks	53	3079	30	16	1	4	4	2.77	.909
Dylan Ferguson	Kamloops Blazers	59	3382	24	28	1	3	1	2.96	.907
Brody Willms	Moose Jaw Warriors	54	3158	37	11	2	2	4	3.00	.898
David Tendeck	Vancouver Giants	48	2745	25	16	3	2	3	3.02	.912

== 2018 WHL playoffs ==
Conference Quarter-finals	Conference Semi-finals
E1	Moose Jaw	4
W2	Prince Albert	3
E1	Moose Jaw	3
E2	Swift Current	4
E2	Swift Current	4
E3	Regina	3
Eastern
C2	Lethbridge	4
C3	Red Deer	1
C2	Lethbridge	4
W1	Brandon	1
C1	Medicine Hat	2
W1	Brandon	4
U1	Everett	4
W2	Seattle	1
U1	Everett	4
U2	Portland	1
U2	Portland	4
U3	Spokane	3
Western
B2	Victoria	4
B3	Vancouver	3
B2	Victoria	0
W1	Tri-City	4
B1	Kelowna	0
W1	Tri-City	4

Conference Finals
E2	Swift Current	4
C2	Lethbridge	2
U1	Everett	4
W1	Tri-City	2

WHL Championship
E2	Swift Current	4
U1	Everett	2

== Conference Quarter-finals ==
=== Eastern Conference ===
==== (E1) Moose Jaw Warriors vs. (W2) Prince Albert Raiders ====
March 23	Moose Jaw Warriors	3 – 5	Prince Albert Raiders	Mosaic Place	Recap
No scoring		First period	Jordy Stallard (1) - 12:41; Jordy Stallard (2) - 17:24
5:53 - Vince Loschiavo (1)		Second period	Cole Fonstad (1) - 7:19; Cole Fonstad (2) - 16:36
16:14 - Tristyn DeRoose (1); 18:46 - pp - Kale Clague (1)		Third period	6:35 - Regan Nagy (1)
Brody Willms (17 saves / 22 shots); Adam Evanoff (2 saves / 2 shots)		Goalie stats	Ian Scott (35 saves / 38 shots)

March 24	Moose Jaw Warriors	3 – 2	OT	Prince Albert Raiders	Mosaic Place	Recap
18:55 - Brett Howden (1)		First period		No scoring
0:11 - Brett Howden (2)		Second period		Sean Montgomery (1) - 12:00
No scoring		Third period		Vojtěch Budík (1) - pp - 4:49
7:30 - Justin Almeida (1)		First overtime period		No scoring
Brody Willms (28 saves / 30 shots)		Goalie stats		Ian Scott (38 saves / 41 shots)

March 27	Prince Albert Raiders	4 – 5	OT	Moose Jaw Warriors	Art Hauser Centre	Recap
0:59 - Curtis Miske (1)		First period		Ryan Peckford (1) - 4:24
12:19 - pp - Vojtěch Budík (2); 17:42 - Jordy Stallard (3)		Second period		Brayden Burke (1) - pp - 9:46
17:20 - Justin Nachbaur (1)		Third period		Josh Brook (1) - 18:23; Brett Howden (3) - 19:10
No scoring		First overtime period		Brayden Burke (2) - 0:19
Ian Scott (40 saves / 45 shots)		Goalie stats		Brody Willms (17 saves / 21 shots)

March 28	Prince Albert Raiders	0 – 2	Moose Jaw Warriors	Art Hauser Centre	Recap
No scoring		First period	No scoring
No scoring		Second period	Justin Almeida (2) - 16:03
No scoring		Third period	Brayden Burke (3) - en - 19:44
Ian Scott (20 saves / 21 shots)		Goalie stats	Brody Willms (32 saves / 32 shots)

March 31	Moose Jaw Warriors	1 – 5	Prince Albert Raiders	Mosaic Place	Recap
No scoring		First period	Sean Montgomery (2) - 10:56; Parker Kelly (1) - 18:07
14:25 - Justin Almeida (3)		Second period	Max Martin (1) - pp - 13:27
No scoring		Third period	Sean Montgomery (3) - 4:15; Curtis Miske (2) - pp - 11:01
Brody Willms (17 saves / 22 shots); Adam Evanoff (4 saves / 4 shots)		Goalie stats	Ian Scott (31 saves / 32 shots)

April 1	Prince Albert Raiders	5 – 4	Moose Jaw Warriors	Art Hauser Centre	Recap
7:34 - Cole Fonstad (3)		First period	Brayden Burke (4) - 17:35
12:09 - pp - Curtis Miske (3); 19:01 - Sean Montgomery (4)		Second period	Brayden Burke (5) - pp - 16:18; Jayden Halbgewachs (1) - 18:17
1:14 - pp - Regan Nagy (2); 11:34 - Cole Fonstad (4)		Third period	Brett Howden (4) - pp - 5:17
Ian Scott (16 saves / 20 shots)		Goalie stats	Brody Willms (27 saves / 32 shots)

April 3	Moose Jaw Warriors	5 – 4	Prince Albert Raiders	Mosaic Place	Recap
7:23 - Jayden Halbgewachs (2); 7:48 - Ryan Peckford (2)		First period	Justin Nachbaur (2) - 1:28; Parker Kelly (2) - 5:59; Parker Kelly (3) - 11:38
18:09 - pp - Justin Almeida (4)		Second period	No scoring
11:01 - pp - Justin Almeida (5); 16:10 - pp - Brayden Burke (6)		Third period	Brayden Pachal (1) - sh - 15:40
Brody Willms (24 saves / 28 shots)		Goalie stats	Ian Scott (21 saves / 26 shots)

Moose Jaw wins series 4 – 3

==== (E2) Swift Current Broncos vs. (E3) Regina Pats ====
March 23	Swift Current Broncos	3 – 0	Regina Pats	Credit Union iPlex	Recap
3:43 - Beck Malenstyn (1); 13:59 - pp - Tyler Steenbergen (1); 18:48 - pp - Matteo Gennaro (1)		First period	No scoring
No scoring		Second period	No scoring
No scoring		Third period	No scoring
Stuart Skinner (34 saves / 34 shots)		Goalie stats	Ryan Kubic (23 saves / 26 shots)

March 24	Swift Current Broncos	1 – 2	Regina Pats	Credit Union iPlex	Recap
No scoring		First period	Cameron Hebig (1) - 9:46
No scoring		Second period	No scoring
12:48 - Kaden Elder (1)		Third period	Cameron Hebig (2) - pp - 5:45
Stuart Skinner (30 saves / 32 shots)		Goalie stats	Ryan Kubic (32 saves / 33 shots)

March 26	Regina Pats	1 – 4	Swift Current Broncos	Brandt Centre	Recap
No scoring		First period	Colby Sissons (1) - 8:11; Glenn Gawdin (1) - pp - 13:58
No scoring		Second period	No scoring
11:34 - Emil Oksanen (1)		Third period	Tanner Nagel (1) - 5:09; Glenn Gawdin (2) - 12:16
Ryan Kubic (20 saves / 24 shots)		Goalie stats	Stuart Skinner (39 saves / 40 shots)

March 28	Regina Pats	6 – 3	Swift Current Broncos	Brandt Centre	Recap
2:28 - Cameron Hebig (3); 9:56 - pp - Emil Oksanen (2)		First period	No scoring
7:26 - Jared Legien (1); 9:44 - pp - Libor Hájek (1); 11:35 - Jake Leschyshyn (1)		Second period	Glenn Gawdin (3) pp - 5:28; Tyler Steenbergen (2) - pp - 15:43
19:21 - en - Jake Leschyshyn (2)		Third period	Matteo Gennaro (2) - pp - 12:47
Ryan Kubic (26 saves / 29 shots)		Goalie stats	Stuart Skinner (15 saves / 20 shots); Joel Hofer (7 saves / 7 shots)

March 30	Swift Current Broncos	5 – 2	Regina Pats	Credit Union iPlex	Recap
16:44 - pp - Tyler Steenbergen (3); 19:06 - pp - Glenn Gawdin (4)		First period	Nick Henry (1) - pp - 9:40
2:40 - pp - Tyler Steenbergen (4); 4:43 - Sahvan Kharia (1); 18:11 - Tyler Steenbergen (5)		Second period	No scoring
No scoring		Third period	Nick Henry (2) - pp - 2:01
Stuart Skinner (40 saves / 42 shots)		Goalie stats	Ryan Kubic (28 saves / 33 shots); Kyle Dumba (0 saves / 0 shots)

March 31	Regina Pats	7 – 2	Swift Current Broncos	Brandt Centre	Recap
14:25 - Robbie Holmes (1); 15:31 - Cameron Hebig (4)		First period	No scoring
0:55 - Cameron Hebig (5); 9:22 - Jake Leschyshyn (3); 16:40 - Nick Henry (3)		Second period	Giorgio Estephan (1) - pp - 14:10
6:54 - Sam Steel (1); 9:40 - Matt Bradley (1)		Third period	Max Patterson (1) - pp - 18:32
Ryan Kubic (25 saves / 27 shots)		Goalie stats	Stuart Skinner (19 saves / 24 shots); Joel Hofer (7 saves / 9 shots)

April 2	Swift Current Broncos	3 – 2	Regina Pats	Credit Union iPlex	Recap
11:14 - Tyler Steenbergen (6)		First period	Cameron Hebig (6) - 6:07
7:45 - Max Patterson (2); 13:37 - Glenn Gawdin (5)		Second period	Robbie Holmes (2) - 15:52
No scoring		Third period	No scoring
Stuart Skinner (36 saves / 38 shots)		Goalie stats	Ryan Kubic (18 saves / 21 shots)

Swift Current wins series 4 – 3

==== (C1) Medicine Hat Tigers vs. (W1) Brandon Wheat Kings ====
March 23	Medicine Hat Tigers	7 – 2	Brandon Wheat Kings	Canalta Centre	Recap
10:32 - pp - Ryan Jevne (1); 10:43 - Cole Clayton (1); 13:56 - pp - Mark Rassell (1)		First period	Luka Burzan (1) - 17:36
3:08 - Ryan Chyzowski (1); 8:50 - sh - Gary Haden (1); 11:35 - Bryan Lockner (1)		Second period	No scoring
3:59 - Kristiāns Rubīns (1)		Third period	James Shearer (1) - pp - 18:34
Jordan Hollett (32 saves / 34 shots)		Goalie stats	Logan Thompson (12 saves / 18 shots); Dylan Myskiw (6 saves / 7 shots)

March 25	Medicine Hat Tigers	7 – 3	Brandon Wheat Kings	Canalta Centre	Recap
4:48 - Ryan Chyzowski (2); 11:19 - David Quenneville (1); 12:06 - pp - Mark Rassell (2)		First period	No scoring
3:12 - Mark Rassell (3); 16:53 - pp - Elijah Brown (1)		Second period	Marcus Sekundiak (1) - 2:53
5:47 - pp - Jaeger White (1); 18:29 - Josh Williams (1)		Third period	Ty Lewis (1) - sh - 4:29; Marcus Sekundiak (2) - 8:47
Jordan Hollett (23 saves / 26 shots)		Goalie stats	Logan Thompson (27 saves / 33 shots); Dylan Myskiw (2 saves / 3 shots)

March 27*	Brandon Wheat Kings	5 – 3	Medicine Hat Tigers	Credit Union Place	Recap
19:51 - Ty Lewis (2)		First period	Mark Rassell (4) - 5:16
3:00 - Connor Gutenberg (1)		Second period	Gary Haden (2) - 13:11
6:23 - Ben McCartney (1); 6:41 - pp - Evan Weinger (1); 18:18 - Ty Lewis (3)		Third period	Jaeger White (2) - pp - 5:41
Dylan Myskiw (32 saves / 35 shots)		Goalie stats	Jordan Hollett (28 saves / 33 shots)

March 28*	Brandon Wheat Kings	5 – 2	Medicine Hat Tigers	Credit Union Place	Recap
17:39 - Daniel Bukac (1); 18:50 - Stelio Mattheos (1)		First period	No scoring
10:34 - pp - Cole Reinhardt (1)		Second period	Josh Williams (2) - 16:59
2:48 - Linden McCorrister (1); 10:12 - Gunnar Wegleitner (1)		Third period	Mark Rassell (5) - 5:41
Dylan Myskiw (38 saves / 40 shots)		Goalie stats	Michael Bullion (31 saves / 36 shots)

March 30	Medicine Hat Tigers	2 – 5	Brandon Wheat Kings	Canalta Centre	Recap
9:14 - Ryan Chyzowski (3)		First period	No scoring
0:33 - Ryan Chyzowski (4)		Second period	Ty Lewis (4) - pp - 5:52; Luka Burzan (2) - 17:01
No scoring		Third period	Connor Gutenberg (2) - pp - 0:19; Linden McCorrister (2) - pp - 2:06; Stelio Mattheos (2) - en - 19:20
Jordan Hollett (26 saves / 30 shots)		Goalie stats	Dylan Myskiw (24 saves / 26 shots)

April 1*	Brandon Wheat Kings	4 – 3	OT	Medicine Hat Tigers	Credit Union Place	Recap
No scoring		First period		Mark Rassell (6) - 3:37
11:53 - Stelio Mattheos (3); 15:57 - Evan Weinger (2)		Second period		Mark Rassell (7) - 10:10
11:51 - Linden McCorrister (3)		Third period		Mark Rassell (8) - 0:34
10:37 - Linden McCorrister (4)		First overtime period		No scoring
Dylan Myskiw (52 saves / 55 shots)		Goalie stats		Jordan Hollett (42 saves / 46 shots)

Brandon wins series 4 – 2

* Note: Games 3, 4, and 6 were played at Credit Union Place in Dauphin due to the Royal Manitoba Winter Fair taking place at the Keystone Centre from March 26 to 31.

==== (C2) Lethbridge Hurricanes vs. (C3) Red Deer Rebels ====
March 23	Lethbridge Hurricanes	6 – 0	Red Deer Rebels	ENMAX Centre	Recap
No scoring		First period	No scoring
3:01 - pp - Taylor Ross (1); 8:23 - Tate Olson (1)		Second period	No scoring
6:50 - Brad Morrison (1); 10:08 - pp - Jordy Bellerive (1); 15:18 - pp - Logan Barlage (1); 16:52 - Jake Elmer (1)		Third period	No scoring
Logan Flodell (30 saves / 30 shots)		Goalie stats	Riley Lamb (20 saves / 26 shots)

March 24	Lethbridge Hurricanes	8 – 3	Red Deer Rebels	ENMAX Centre	Recap
7:44 - sh - Dylan Cozens (1); 11:49 - pp - Dylan Cozens (2); 13:03 - Zachary Cox (1); 17:41 - Brad Morrison (2)		First period	Brandon Hagel (1) - pp - 0:59; Josh Tarzwell (1) - 18:38
6:59 - Taylor Ross (2); 8:39 - pp - Dylan Cozens (3); 9:15 - pp - Jordy Bellerive (2)		Second period	No scoring
4:43 - Brad Morrison (3)		Third period	Brandon Hagel (2) - pp - 10:55
Logan Flodell (28 saves / 30 shots); Reece Klassen (3 saves / 4 shots)		Goalie stats	Ethan Anders (6 saves / 9 shots); Riley Lamb (24 saves / 29 shots)

March 27	Red Deer Rebels	4 – 5	OT	Lethbridge Hurricanes	ENMAX Centrium	Recap
18:14 - sh - Brandon Hagel (3)		First period		Taylor Ross (3) - pp - 1:35
13:52 - Kristian Reichel (1)		Second period		Zachary Cox (2) - 6:48; Brad Morrison (4) - pp - 19:42
13:38 - Grayson Pawlenchuk (1); 19:13 - pp - Kristian Reichel (2)		Third period		Jordy Bellerive (3) - 12:29
No scoring		First overtime period		Calen Addison (1) - pp - 0:38
Riley Lamb (25 saves / 30 shots)		Goalie stats		Logan Flodell (25 saves / 29 shots)

March 28	Red Deer Rebels	5 – 2	Lethbridge Hurricanes	ENMAX Centrium	Recap
7:33 - Reese Johnson (1)		First period	Matt Stanley (1) - 19:20
16:15 - Mason McCarty (1)		Second period	Tate Olson (2) - 15:17
0:38 - pp - Brandon Hagel (4); 11:39 - Alexander Alexeyev (1); 19:32 - sh - Kristian Reichel (3)		Third period	No scoring
Ethan Anders (28 saves / 30 shots)		Goalie stats	Logan Flodell (31 saves / 35 shots)

March 31	Lethbridge Hurricanes	6 – 4	Red Deer Rebels	ENMAX Centre	Recap
7:08 - Brad Morrison (5); 16:08 - pp - Jordy Bellerive (4)		First period	Grayson Pawlenchuk (2) - 9:34; Brandon Hagel (5) - pp - 14:00
No scoring		Second period	Alexander Alexeyev (2) - pp - 3:52
3:17 - Calen Addison (2); 4:40 - Taylor Ross (4); 7:24 - Taylor Ross (5); 18:42 - en - Brad Morrison (6)		Third period	Reese Johnson (2) - 6:24
Logan Flodell (20 saves / 24 shots)		Goalie stats	Ethan Anders (44 saves / 49 shots)

Lethbridge wins series 4 – 1

=== Western Conference ===
==== (U1) Everett Silvertips vs. (W2) Seattle Thunderbirds ====
March 23	Everett Silvertips	4 – 1	Seattle Thunderbirds	Angel of the Winds Arena	Recap
10:19 - Garrett Pilon (1)		First period	No scoring
1:47 - sh - Patrick Bajkov (1); 5:59 - Patrick Bajkov (2); 10:12 - Bryce Kindopp (1)		Second period	Zack Andrusiak (1) - 7:03
No scoring		Third period	No scoring
Carter Hart (25 saves / 26 shots)		Goalie stats	Liam Hughes (42 saves / 46 shots)

March 24	Everett Silvertips	4 – 5	OT	Seattle Thunderbirds	Angel of the Winds Arena	Recap
2:17 - Martin Faško-Rudáš (1)		First period		Austin Strand (1) - pp - 4:15; Sami Moilanen (1) - 6:33
0:33 - pp - Garrett Pilon (2); 17:11 - Garrett Pilon (3)		Second period		Turner Ottenbreit (1) - pp - 13:23
19:06 - Garrett Pilon (4)		Third period		Mike McLean (1) - 7:35
No scoring		First overtime period		Zack Andrusiak (2) - 5:04
Carter Hart (28 saves / 33 shots)		Goalie stats		Liam Hughes (45 saves / 49 shots)

March 27	Seattle Thunderbirds	1 – 3	Everett Silvertips	accesso ShoWare Center	Recap
1:38 - pp - Nolan Volcan (1)		First period	Reece Vitelli (1) - 8:56
No scoring		Second period	Matt Fonteyne (1) - pp - 4:58
No scoring		Third period	Matt Fonteyne (2) - en - 19:29
Liam Hughes (34 saves / 36 shots)		Goalie stats	Carter Hart (33 saves / 34 shots)

March 30	Seattle Thunderbirds	3 – 7	Everett Silvertips	accesso ShoWare Center	Recap
13:12 - Nolan Volcan (2)		First period	Patrick Bajkov (3) - pp - 12:10; Kevin Davis (1) - 12:48; Connor Dewar (1) - sh - ps - 19:26
No scoring		Second period	Sean Richards (1) - 3:45; Ethan O'Rourke (1) - 13:08
1:36 - Dillon Hamaliuk (1); 6:41 - Matthew Wedman (1)		Third period	Riley Sutter (1) - 15:37; Matt Fonteyne (3) - en - 17:15
Liam Hughes (29 saves / 35 shots)		Goalie stats	Carter Hart (28 saves / 31 shots)

March 31	Everett Silvertips	4 – 0	Seattle Thunderbirds	Angel of the Winds Arena	Recap
5:46 - Riley Sutter (2)		First period	No scoring
11:42 - Ondřej Vála (1); 16:10 - pp - Patrick Bajkov (4)		Second period	No scoring
17:29 - en - Connor Dewar (2)		Third period	No scoring
Carter Hart (36 saves / 36 shots)		Goalie stats	Liam Hughes (42 saves / 45 shots)

Everett wins series 4 – 1

==== (U2) Portland Winterhawks vs. (U3) Spokane Chiefs ====
March 24	Portland Winterhawks	3 – 4	OT	Spokane Chiefs	Veterans Memorial Coliseum	Recap
No scoring		First period		Nolan Reid (1) - 18:32
0:48 - pp - Dennis Cholowski (1); 5:51 - Henri Jokiharju (1); 17:02 - Dennis Cholowski (2)		Second period		Riley Woods (1) - 1:07; Hudson Elynuik (1) - pp - 11:55
No scoring		Third period		No scoring
No scoring		First overtime period		Luke Toporowski (1) - 2:15
Cole Kehler (35 saves / 39 shots)		Goalie stats		Bailey Brkin (36 saves / 39 shots)

March 25	Portland Winterhawks	4 – 3	Spokane Chiefs	Veterans Memorial Coliseum	Recap
2:25 - Kieffer Bellows (1); 8:43 - Jake Gricius (1); 15:28 - Alex Overhardt (1)		First period	No scoring
6:36 - Mason Mannek (1)		Second period	Tyson Helgesen (1) - 14:33; Ethan McIndoe (1) - pp - 18:49
No scoring		Third period	Zach Fischer (1) - 5:57
Cole Kehler (26 saves / 29 shots)		Goalie stats	Bailey Brkin (12 saves / 15 shots); Dawson Weatherill (15 saves / 16 shots)

March 28	Spokane Chiefs	1 – 3	Portland Winterhawks	Spokane Veterans Memorial Arena	Recap
No scoring		First period	Cody Glass (1) - 6:50
5:31 - Jaret Anderson-Dolan (1)		Second period	Dennis Cholowski (3) - pp - 7:53; Joachim Blichfeld (1) - 11:30
No scoring		Third period	No scoring
Bailey Brkin (27 saves / 30 shots)		Goalie stats	Cole Kehler (28 saves / 29 shots)

March 29	Spokane Chiefs	3 – 4	Portland Winterhawks	Spokane Veterans Memorial Arena	Recap
9:01 - pp - Hudson Elynuik (2); 10:28 - Eli Zummack (1)		First period	Alex Overhardt (2) - 17:39
No scoring		Second period	No scoring
9:50 - pp - Jaret Anderson-Dolan (2)		Third period	Skyler McKenzie (1) - 2:30; Joachim Blichfeld (2) - 13:38; Joachim Blichfeld (3) - 13:45
Dawson Weatherill (20 saves / 24 shots)		Goalie stats	Cole Kehler (25 saves / 28 shots)

March 31	Portland Winterhawks	4 – 5	OT	Spokane Chiefs	Veterans Memorial Coliseum	Recap
9:20 - Mason Mannek (2); 16:10 - Cody Glass (2)		First period		Riley Woods (2) - pp - 12:38
12:57 - Ryan Hughes (1)		Second period		Hudson Elynuik (3) - 12:38
13:33 - Dennis Cholowski (4)		Third period		Jake McGrew (1) - 5:05; Nolan Reid (2) - 19:30
No scoring		First overtime period		Kailer Yamamoto (1) - 9:19
Cole Kehler (49 saves / 54 shots)		Goalie stats		Dawson Weatherill (40 saves / 44 shots)

April 2	Spokane Chiefs	5 – 2	Portland Winterhawks	Spokane Veterans Memorial Arena	Recap
16:29 - Jake McGrew (2); 16:43 - Eli Zummack (2)		First period	No scoring
7:52 - Ty Smith (1); 13:50 - pp - Ethan McIndoe (2)		Second period	Mason Mannek (3) - pp - 3:42
16:39 - Luke Toporowski (2)		Third period	Henri Jokiharju (2) - 4:09
Dawson Weatherill (31 saves / 33 shots)		Goalie stats	Cole Kehler (22 saves / 27 shots)

April 3	Portland Winterhawks	3 – 1	Spokane Chiefs	Veterans Memorial Coliseum	Recap
9:38 - pp - Cody Glass (3)		First period	No scoring
No scoring		Second period	Ty Smith (2) - 11:31
15:22 - Kieffer Bellows (2); 17:37 - pp - Skyler McKenzie (2)		Third period	No scoring
Cole Kehler (30 saves / 31 shots)		Goalie stats	Dawson Weatherill (39 saves / 42 shots)

Portland wins series 4 – 3

==== (B1) Kelowna Rockets vs. (W1) Tri-City Americans ====
March 22	Kelowna Rockets	0 – 5	Tri-City Americans	Prospera Place	Recap
No scoring		First period	Morgan Geekie (1) - 15:22
No scoring		Second period	Isaac Johnson (1) - 5:11
No scoring		Third period	Morgan Geekie (2) - pp - 3:38; Michael Rasmussen (1) - pp - 4:01; Michael Rasmussen (2) - pp - 6:00
James Porter (27 saves / 32 shots)		Goalie stats	Patrick Dea (39 saves / 39 shots)

March 24	Kelowna Rockets	7 – 9	Tri-City Americans	Prospera Place	Recap
0:36 - pp - Kole Lind (1); 0:51 - Kyle Topping (1); 3:00 - Cal Foote (1)		First period	Michael Rasmussen (3) - pp - 8:51; Nolan Yaremko (1) - pp - 13:36; Michael Rasmussen (4) - 15:19; Nolan Yaremko (2) - 16:09
2:45 - Nolan Foote (1); 8:58 - pp - Kole Lind (2); 15:01 - Kaedan Korczak (1)		Second period	Isaac Johnson (2) - 11:18
11:37 - pp - Carsen Twarynski (1)		Third period	Morgan Geekie (3) - 3:00; Morgan Geekie (4) - 12:10; Isaac Johnson (3) - 13:12; Nolan Yaremko (3) - en - 19:11
James Porter (12 saves / 16 shots); Brodan Salmond (18 saves / 22 shots)		Goalie stats	Patrick Dea (10 saves / 16 shots); Beck Warm (9 saves / 10 shots)

March 28	Tri-City Americans	5 – 3	Kelowna Rockets	Toyota Center	Recap
3:08 - pp - Juuso Välimäki (1); 10:10 - Brett Clayton (1)		First period	Carsen Twarynski (2) - 10:22
1:08 - Michael Rasmussen (2); 13:04 - Morgan Geekie (5)		Second period	Kole Lind (3) - 1:26
13:05 - pp - Morgan Geekie (6)		Third period	Conner Bruggen-Cate (1) - 18:29
Patrick Dea (22 saves / 25 shots)		Goalie stats	James Porter (21 saves / 26 shots)

March 29	Tri-City Americans	5 – 3	Kelowna Rockets	Toyota Center	Recap
7:04 - Jordan Topping (1)		First period	No scoring
17:41 - Morgan Geekie (7)		Second period	Dillon Dubé (1) - 4:38
10:03 - Nolan Yaremko (4); 19:05 - Morgan Geekie (8); 19:22 - Morgan Geekie (9)		Third period	Kyle Topping (2) - pp - 4:45; Dillon Dubé (2) - 10:44
Patrick Dea (25 saves / 28 shots)		Goalie stats	James Porter (36 saves / 41 shots)

Tri-City wins series 4 – 0

==== (B2) Victoria Royals vs. (B3) Vancouver Giants ====
March 23	Victoria Royals	1 – 2	Vancouver Giants	Save-On-Foods Memorial Centre	Recap
No scoring		First period	No scoring
11:36 - Tanner Kaspick (1)		Second period	Miloš Roman (1) - 5:48; Matt Barberis (1) - 18:25
No scoring		Third period	No scoring
Griffen Outhouse (31 saves / 33 shots)		Goalie stats	Trent Miner (40 saves / 41 shots)

March 24	Victoria Royals	5 – 4	Vancouver Giants	Save-On-Foods Memorial Centre	Recap
8:44 - Braydon Buziak (1); 15:04 - Noah Gregor (1); 17:22 - Tarun Fizer (1)		First period	Dawson Holt (1) - 16:34
12:01 - pp - Jared Freadrich (1); 18:02 - Jeff de Wit (1)		Second period	Brennan Riddle (1) - 3:11; Miloš Roman (2) - 4:26; Dawson Holt (2) - 12:18
No scoring		Third period	No scoring
Griffen Outhouse (33 saves / 37 shots)		Goalie stats	Trent Miner (21 saves / 26 shots)

March 27	Vancouver Giants	5 – 1	Victoria Royals	Langley Events Centre	Recap
6:32 - Owen Hardy (1)		First period	No scoring
19:19 - pp - Tyler Benson (1)		Second period	No scoring
7:41 - Miloš Roman (3); 10:54 - Bowen Byram (1); 15:16 - James Malm (1)		Third period	Noah Gregor (2) - pp - 12:08
David Tendeck (35 saves / 36 shots)		Goalie stats	Griffen Outhouse (28 saves / 33 shots)

March 29	Vancouver Giants	3 – 7	Victoria Royals	Langley Events Centre	Recap
No scoring		First period	Matthew Phillips (1) - 7:18; Ralph Jarratt (1) - 13:52; Tyler Soy (1) - pp - 17:44
1:33 - pp - Dylan Plouffe (1); 7:20 - Davis Koch (1)		Second period	Dante Hannoun (1) - 12:22; Tyler Soy (2) - pp - 13:54
18:00 - Jared Dmytriw (1)		Third period	Tyler Soy (3) - 3:10; Jeff de Wit (2) - pp - 11:52
David Tendeck (24 saves / 31 shots)		Goalie stats	Griffen Outhouse (24 saves / 26 shots); Dean McNabb (3 saves / 4 shots)

March 31	Victoria Royals	3 – 5	Vancouver Giants	Save-On-Foods Memorial Centre	Recap
No scoring		First period	Davis Koch (2) - 9:41
10:22 - Matthew Phillips (2)		Second period	Bowen Byram (2) - 7:28; Bowen Byram (3) - 8:13; Jared Dmytriw (2) - 9:56
7:21 - Noah Gregor (3); 11:41 - pp - Dante Hannoun (2)		Third period	James Malm (2) - 8:43
Griffen Outhouse (26 saves / 31 shots)		Goalie stats	David Tendeck (26 saves / 29 shots)

April 2	Vancouver Giants	3 – 4	OT	Victoria Royals	Langley Events Centre	Recap
7:07 - Tyler Benson (2)		First period		No scoring
No scoring		Second period		Dante Hannoun (3) - 14:57
6:10 - Ty Ronning (1); 14:37 - Tyler Benson (3)		Third period		Matthew Phillips (3) - 0:18; Matthew Phillips (4) - pp - 2:15
No scoring		First overtime period		Noah Gregor (4) - 7:06
David Tendeck (16 saves / 20 shots)		Goalie stats		Griffen Outhouse (40 saves / 43 shots)

April 3	Victoria Royals	4 – 3	Vancouver Giants	Save-On-Foods Memorial Centre	Recap
18:36 - pp - Chaz Reddekopp (1)		First period	No scoring
1:17 - Lane Zablocki (1); 6:01 - Matthew Phillips (5); 9:36 - Matthew Phillips (6)		Second period	Tyler Popowich (1) - 7:49; Matt Barberis (2) - 14:27; Brendan Riddle (2) - 18:40
No scoring		Third period	No scoring
Griffen Outhouse (30 saves / 33 shots)		Goalie stats	David Tendeck (17 saves / 20 shots); Trent Miner (3 saves / 4 shots)

Victoria wins series 4 – 3

== Conference Semi-finals ==
=== Eastern Conference ===
==== (E1) Moose Jaw Warriors vs. (E2) Swift Current Broncos ====
April 6	Moose Jaw Warriors	5 – 3	Swift Current Broncos	Mosaic Place	Recap
15:34 - Jayden Halbgewachs (3)		First period	No scoring
5:15 - pp - Justin Almeida (6); 7:50 - Tanner Jeannot (1)		Second period	Sahvan Khaira (2) - 19:19
10:33 - Brayden Burke (7); 19:51 - en - Tanner Jeannot (2)		Third period	Andrew Fyten (1) - sh - 5:44; Tyler Steenbergen (7) - 13:35
Brody Willms (25 saves / 28 shots)		Goalie stats	Stuart Skinner (20 saves / 24 shots)

April 7	Moose Jaw Warriors	0 – 4	Swift Current Broncos	Mosaic Place	Recap
No scoring		First period	Glenn Gawdin (6) - pp - 13:08
No scoring		Second period	Giorgio Estephan (2) - 2:57; Tyler Steenbergen (8) - 7:27
No scoring		Third period	Kaden Elder (2) - en - 17:57
Brody Willms (26 saves / 29 shots)		Goalie stats	Stuart Skinner (20 saves / 20 shots)

April 10	Swift Current Broncos	3 – 4	OT	Moose Jaw Warriors	Credit Union iPlex	Recap
9:21 - pp - Glenn Gawdin (7)		First period		Brayden Burke (8) - 12:11
9:43 - pp - Matteo Gennaro (3); 12:18 - Artyom Minulin (1)		Second period		Brett Howden (5) - pp - 5:24
No scoring		Third period		Brayden Burke (9) - 5:11
No scoring		First overtime period		Brett Howden (6) - 2:49
Stuart Skinner (27 saves / 31 shots)		Goalie stats		Brody Willms (20 saves / 23 shots)

April 11	Swift Current Broncos	3 – 2	2OT	Moose Jaw Warriors	Credit Union iPlex	Recap
14:07 - pp - Matteo Gennaro (4)		First period		No scoring
No scoring		Second period		Tanner Jeannot (3) - 8:40; Jett Woo (1) - 18:24
1:22 - pp - Matteo Gennaro (5)		Third period		No scoring
18:14 - Matteo Gennaro (6)		Second overtime period		No scoring
Stuart Skinner (51 saves / 53 shots)		Goalie stats		Brody Willms (40 saves / 43 shots)

April 13	Moose Jaw Warriors	0 – 2	Swift Current Broncos	Mosaic Place	Recap
No scoring		First period	Kaden Elder (3) - 3:53
No scoring		Second period	No scoring
No scoring		Third period	Giorgio Estephan (3) - 9:56
Brody Willms (22 saves / 24 shots)		Goalie stats	Stuart Skinner (36 saves / 36 shots)

April 14	Swift Current Broncos	2 – 3	3OT	Moose Jaw Warriors	Credit Union iPlex	Recap
No scoring		First period		No scoring
13:43 - pp - Matteo Gennaro (7)		Second period		No scoring
3:35 - Tyler Steenbergen (9)		Third period		Jett Woo (2) - 6:43; Brett Howden (7) - 11:28
No scoring		Third overtime period		Jayden Halbgewachs (4) - pp - 1:14
Stuart Skinner (35 saves / 38 shots)		Goalie stats		Brody Willms (58 saves / 60 shots)

April 16	Moose Jaw Warriors	0 – 6	Swift Current Broncos	Mosaic Place	Recap
No scoring		First period	Colby Sissons (2) - 12:45; Glenn Gawdin (8) - 19:25
No scoring		Second period	Tyler Steenbergen (10) - 3:22; Glenn Gawdin (9) - 4:40
No scoring		Third period	Giorgio Estephan (4) - pp - 3:42; Max Patterson (3) - 6:19
Brody Willms (32 saves / 38 shots)		Goalie stats	Stuart Skinner (25 saves / 25 shots)

Swift Current wins series 4 – 3

==== (C2) Lethbridge Hurricanes vs. (W1) Brandon Wheat Kings ====
April 6	Lethbridge Hurricanes	5 – 1	Brandon Wheat Kings	ENMAX Centre	Recap
6:23 - sh - Taylor Ross (6); 9:43 - pp - Jordy Bellerive (5)		First period	No scoring
13:15 - pp - Jadon Joseph (1)		Second period	Marcus Sekundiak (3) - 6:31
6:20 - pp - Taylor Ross (7); 14:00 - pp - Jordy Bellerive (6)		Third period	No scoring
Logan Flodell (25 saves / 26 shots)		Goalie stats	Dylan Myskiw (30 saves / 35 shots)

April 7	Lethbridge Hurricanes	5 – 4	OT	Brandon Wheat Kings	ENMAX Centre	Recap
No scoring		First period		Marcus Sekundiak (4) - 2:53
15:26 - Jordy Bellerive (7); 17:29 - sh - Taylor Ross (8)		Second period		Connor Gutenberg (3) - 2:55; Stelio Mattheos (4) - 3:36; Evan Weinger (3) - sh - 4:27
12:11 - Jordy Bellerive (8); 17:22 - pp - Jake Elmer (2)		Third period		No scoring
16:31 - Tate Olson (3)		First overtime period		No scoring
Logan Flodell (29 saves / 33 shots)		Goalie stats		Dylan Myskiw (42 saves / 47 shots)

April 10	Brandon Wheat Kings	5 – 4	Lethbridge Hurricanes	Westoba Place	Recap
3:57 - Linden McCorrister (5); 18:51 - pp - Ty Lewis (5)		First period	Logan Barlage (2) - 16:08
3:12 - Luka Burzan (4); 17:35 - Luka Burzan (5); 19:14 - pp - Stelio Mattheos (5)		Second period	Calen Addison (3) - 2:54; Brad Morrison (7) - pp - 9:12
No scoring		Third period	Brad Morrison (8) - pp - 14:35
Dylan Myskiw (35 saves / 39 shots)		Goalie stats	Logan Flodell (35 saves / 40 shots)

April 11	Brandon Wheat Kings	4 – 7	Lethbridge Hurricanes	Westoba Place	Recap
No scoring		First period	Brad Morrison (9) - 1:50; Jake Elmer (3) - 5:11; Dylan Cozens (4) - 8:34; Brad Morrison (10) - 10:05
3:28 - Marcus Sekundiak (5); 6:14 - Luka Burzan (5); 12:18 - Stelio Mattheos (6)		Second period	Zane Franklin (1) - 15:25
4:34 - Ty Lewis (6)		Third period	Jake Elmer (4) - 1:37; Logan Barlage (3) - 17:02
Dylan Myskiw (20 saves / 27 shots)		Goalie stats	Logan Flodell (27 saves / 31 shots)

April 13	Lethbridge Hurricanes	3 – 0	Brandon Wheat Kings	ENMAX Centre	Recap
10:09 - sh - Brad Morrison (11)		First period	No scoring
10:53 - pp - Logan Barlage (4)		Second period	No scoring
19:54 - en - Brad Morrison (12)		Third period	No scoring
Logan Flodell (32 saves / 32 shots)		Goalie stats	Dylan Myskiw (27 saves / 29 shots)

Lethbridge wins series 4 – 1

=== Western Conference ===
==== (U1) Everett Silvertips vs. (U2) Portland Winterhawks ====
April 6	Everett Silvertips	2 – 5	Portland Winterhawks	Angel of the Winds Arena	Recap
No scoring		First period	Jake Gricius (2) - 2:13; Conor MacEachern (1) - 9:32
12:36 - Matt Fonteyne (4); 18:53 - Sean Richards (2)		Second period	John Ludvig (1) - 2:52; Skyler McKenzie (3) - 19:58
No scoring		Third period	Cody Glass (4) - 9:57
Carter Hart (31 saves / 36 shots)		Goalie stats	Cole Kehler (32 saves / 34 shots)

April 7	Everett Silvertips	6 – 0	Portland Winterhawks	Angel of the Winds Arena	Recap
1:02 - Sean Richards (3); 13:27 - Patrick Bajkov (5)		First period	No scoring
3:23 - Martin Faško-Rudáš (2); 4:51 - pp - Patrick Bajkov (6); 15:13 - Garrett Pilon (5)		Second period	No scoring
18:25 - pp - Patrick Bajkov (7)		Third period	No scoring
Carter Hart (26 saves / 26 shots)		Goalie stats	Cole Kehler (17 saves / 22 shots); Shane Farkas (9 saves / 10 shots)

April 10	Portland Winterhawks	2 – 6	Everett Silvertips	Veterans Memorial Coliseum	Recap
15:35 - Dennis Cholowski (5)		First period	Riley Sutter (3) - 4:35; Bryce Kindopp (2) - 7:43; Riley Sutter (4) - 9:11
14:11 - pp - Kieffer Bellows (3)		Second period	Reece Vitelli (2) - 14:49
No scoring		Third period	Martin Faško-Rudáš (3) - 7:06; Connor Dewar (3) - en - 17:55
Cole Kehler (22 saves / 27 shots)		Goalie stats	Carter Hart (40 saves / 42 shots)

April 12*	Portland Winterhawks	2 – 3	Everett Silvertips	Veterans Memorial Coliseum	Recap
No scoring		First period	Connor Dewar (4) - 18:59
No scoring		Second period	No scoring
5:14 - Brendan De Jong (1); 17:53 - pp - Henri Jokiharju (3)		Third period	Riley Sutter (6) - 18:02; Wyatte Wylie (1) - 18:48
Cole Kehler (23 saves / 26 shots)		Goalie stats	Carter Hart (42 saves / 44 shots)

April 13	Everett Silvertips	4 – 0	Portland Winterhawks	Angel of the Winds Arena	Recap
No scoring		First period	No scoring
9:53 - Jake Christiansen (1)		Second period	No scoring
2:49 - Riley Sutter (5); 7:13 - Gianni Fairbrother (1); 15:57 - en - Jake Christiansen (2)		Third period	No scoring
Carter Hart (30 saves / 30 shots); Dustin Wolf (4 saves / 4 shots)		Goalie stats	Cole Kehler (39 saves / 42 shots)

Everett wins series 4 – 1

* Note: Game 4 was played at Moda Center.

==== (B2) Victoria Royals vs. (W1) Tri-City Americans ====
April 6	Victoria Royals	0 – 7	Tri-City Americans	Save-On-Foods Memorial Centre	Recap
No scoring		First period	Michael Rasmussen (6) - 11:18
No scoring		Second period	Morgan Geekie (10) - 6:08; Jake Bean (1) - 12:50; Nolan Yaremko (5) - 16:45
No scoring		Third period	Dylan Coghlan (1) - pp - 0:32; Jordan Topping (2) - 5:44; Parker AuCoin (1) - 17:14
Griffen Outhouse (31 saves / 38 shots); Dean McNabb (1 save / 1 shot)		Goalie stats	Patrick Dea (27 saves / 27 shots)

April 7	Victoria Royals	1 – 4	Tri-City Americans	Save-On-Foods Memorial Centre	Recap
No scoring		First period	No scoring
6:59 - pp - Dante Hannoun (4)		Second period	Michael Rasmussen (7) - 0:49; Michael Rasmussen (8) - pp - 16:05
No scoring		Third period	Morgan Geekie (11) - 2:49; Michael Rasmussen (9) - en - 18:44
Patrick Dea (25 saves / 26 shots)		Goalie stats	Griffen Outhouse (37 saves / 40 shots); Dean McNabb (0 saves / 0 shots)

April 10	Tri-City Americans	6 – 5	Victoria Royals	Toyota Center	Recap
9:45 - pp - Morgan Geekie (12); 10:44 - pp - Nolan Yaremko (6)		First period	No scoring
2:45 - Morgan Geekie (13); 11:10 - Morgan Geekie (14)		Second period	No scoring
6:39 - Dylan Coghlan (2); 19:15 - en - Michael Rasmussen (10)		Third period	Igor Martynov (1) - 7:36; Tarun Fizer (2) - 11:21; Lane Zablocki (2) - pp - 15:42; Dante Hannoun (5) - 17:50; Andrei Grishakov (1) - 19:58
Patrick Dea (27 saves / 32 shots)		Goalie stats	Griffen Outhouse (25 saves / 30 shots)

April 11	Tri-City Americans	5 – 3	Victoria Royals	Toyota Center	Recap
9:09 - Isaac Johnson (4); 12:36 - Sasha Mutala (1); 15:58 - Dylan Coghlan (3)		First period	Noah Gregor (5) - 3:49
No scoring		Second period	Kaid Oliver (1) - 2:43; Noah Gregor (6) - pp - 11:20
5:29 - Morgan Geekie (15); 16:21 - Riley Sawchuk (1)		Third period	No scoring
Patrick Dea (24 saves / 27 shots)		Goalie stats	Griffen Outhouse (34 saves / 39 shots)

Tri-City wins series 4 – 0

== Conference Finals ==
=== Eastern Conference ===
==== (E2) Swift Current Broncos vs. (C2) Lethbridge Hurricanes ====
April 20	Swift Current Broncos	3 – 2	Lethbridge Hurricanes	Credit Union iPlex	Recap
No scoring		First period	No scoring
6:15 - Max Patterson (4); 13:05 - pp - Giorgio Estephan (5)		Second period	No scoring
11:11 - Aleksi Heponiemi (1)		Third period	Matt Stanley (2) - 6:37; Calen Addison (4) - pp - 9:56
Stuart Skinner (39 saves / 41 shots)		Goalie stats	Logan Flodell (27 saves / 30 shots)

April 21	Swift Current Broncos	4 – 3	OT	Lethbridge Hurricanes	Credit Union iPlex	Recap
3:58 - pp - Giorgio Estephan (6); 4:53 - Giorgio Estephan (7)		First period		No scoring
No scoring		Second period		Jordy Bellerive (9) - 4:03; Dylan Cozens (5) - ps - 15:51; Jadon Joseph (2) - 18:43
9:23 - pp - Aleksi Heponiemi (2)		Third period		No scoring
9:41 - Giorgio Estephan (8)		First overtime period		No scoring
Stuart Skinner (36 saves / 39 shots)		Goalie stats		Logan Flodell (29 saves / 32 shots)

April 24	Lethbridge Hurricanes	5 – 1	Swift Current Broncos	ENMAX Centre	Recap
No scoring		First period	No scoring
2:11 - pp - Dylan Cozens (6); 17:59 - pp - Brad Morrison (13)		Second period	Andrew Fyten (2) - 16:53
1:14 - Dylan Cozens (7); 11:35 - Brad Morrison (14); 16:12 - en - Brad Morrison (15)		Third period	No scoring
Logan Flodell (23 saves / 24 shots)		Goalie stats	Stuart Skinner (29 saves / 33 shots)

April 25	Lethbridge Hurricanes	5 – 1	Swift Current Broncos	ENMAX Centre	Recap
6:28 - sh - Jadon Joseph (3); 14:03 - pp - Logan Barlage (5); 17:43 - pp - Taylor Ross (9)		First period	Tyler Steenbergen (11) - 14:54
18:32 - pp - Calen Addison (5)		Second period	No scoring
6:57 - pp - Calen Addison (6)		Third period	No scoring
Logan Flodell (25 saves / 26 shots)		Goalie stats	Stuart Skinner (23 saves / 28 shots)

April 28	Swift Current Broncos	4 – 3	Lethbridge Hurricanes	Credit Union iPlex	Recap
No scoring		First period	No scoring
13:12 - Max Patterson (5); 19:12 - pp - Giorgio Estephan (9)		Second period	Zane Franklin (2) - 18:45
2:37 - Colby Sissons (3); 6:41 - Giorgio Estephan (10)		Third period	Brad Morrison (16) - 3:57; Egor Zudilov (1) - pp - 18:59
Stuart Skinner (27 saves / 30 shots)		Goalie stats	Logan Flodell (28 saves / 32 shots)

April 30	Lethbridge Hurricanes	1 – 5	Swift Current Broncos	ENMAX Centre	Recap
16:36 - Calen Addison (7)		First period	No scoring
No scoring		Second period	Matteo Gennaro (8) - 6:33; Aleksi Heponiemi (3) - 7:02; Beck Malenstyn (2) - sh - 8:09
No scoring		Third period	Giorgio Estephan (11) - pp - 2:12; Beck Malenstyn (3) - en - 16:51
Logan Flodell (22 saves / 26 shots)		Goalie stats	Stuart Skinner (33 saves / 34 shots)

Swift Current wins series 4 – 2

=== Western Conference ===
==== (U1) Everett Silvertips vs. (W1) Tri-City Americans ====
April 20	Everett Silvertips	3 – 2	Tri-City Americans	Angel of the Winds Arena	Recap
1:05 - Garrett Pilon (7); 12:03 - Connor Dewar (5)		First period	No scoring
17:12 - Garrett Pilon (8)		Second period	0:47 - pp - Morgan Geekie (16); 3:55 - pp - Morgan Rasmussen (11)
No scoring		Third period	No scoring
Carter Hart (24 shots / 26 saves)		Goalie stats	Patrick Dea (30 saves / 33 shots)

April 21	Everett Silvertips	3 – 5	Tri-City Americans	Angel of the Winds Arena	Recap
7:34 - pp - Matt Fonteyne (5); 14:37 - pp - Patrick Bajkov (8)		First period	Parker AuCoin (2) - 12:29
No scoring		Second period	Jordan Topping (3) - 12:02
11:25 - Garrett Pilon (9)		Third period	Parker AuCoin (3) - 10:19; Maxwell James (1) - 12:29; Michael Rasmussen (12) - en - 19:38
Carter Hart (22 saves / 26 shots)		Goalie stats	Patrick Dea (37 saves / 40 shots)

April 23	Tri-City Americans	4 – 8	Everett Silvertips	Toyota Center	Recap
15:55 - pp - Michael Rasmussen (13)		First period	Martin Faško-Rudáš (4) - 2:36; Patrick Bajkov (9) - 10:21
1:42 - pp - Juuso Välimäki (2)		Second period	Reece Vitelli (3) - 3:55; Ian Walker (1) - 13:02
0:47 - Isaac Johnson (5); 1:45 - Michael Rasmussen (14)		Third period	Patrick Bajkov (10) - 6:54; Patrick Bajkov (11) - 9:21; Connor Dewar (6) - 10:47; Garrett Pilon (10) - 11:44
Patrick Dea (18 saves / 26 shots); Beck Warm (2 saves / 2 shots)		Goalie stats	Carter Hart (29 saves / 33 shots)

April 26	Tri-City Americans	1 – 3	Everett Silvertips	Toyota Center	Recap
No scoring		First period	No scoring
No scoring		Second period	Riley Sutter (6) - 9:48; Reece Vitelli (4) - 17:22
5:45 - Riley Sawchuk (2)		Third period	Matt Fonteyne (6) - en - 19:20
Patrick Dea (23 saves / 25 shots)		Goalie stats	Carter Hart (29 saves / 30 shots)

April 28	Everett Silvertips	2 – 5	Tri-City Americans	Angel of the Winds Arena	Recap
0:07 - Connor Dewar (7)		First period	No scoring
No scoring		Second period	Juuso Välimäki (3) - 2:29; Nolan Yaremko (7) - 12:42
17:11 - Connor Dewar (8)		Third period	Juuso Välimäki (4) - 5:23; Parker AuCoin (4) - 15:57; Michael Rasmussen (15) - en - 18:11
Carter Hart (19 saves / 23 shots)		Goalie stats	Patrick Dea (35 saves / 37 shots)

April 30	Tri-City Americans	5 – 6	OT	Everett Silvertips	Toyota Center	Recap
11:25 - pp - Morgan Geekie (17)		First period		Patrick Bajkov (12) - 8:54; Patrick Bajkov (13) - pp - 18:23
1:19 - Kyle Olson (1); 6:30 - pp - Michael Rasmussen (16)		Second period		No scoring
4:37 - Kyle Olson (2); 8:52 - Jordan Topping (4)		Third period		Connor Dewar (9) - 9:52; Kevin Davis (2) - 13:53; Garrett Pilon (11) - 14:29
No scoring		First overtime period		Kevin Davis (3) - pp - 5:58
Patrick Dea (36 saves / 42 shots)		Goalie stats		Carter Hart (18 saves / 23 shots)

Everett wins series 4 – 2

== WHL Championship ==
=== (E2) Swift Current Broncos vs. (U1) Everett Silvertips ===
May 4	Swift Current Broncos	1 – 2	Everett Silvertips	Credit Union iPlex	Recap
No scoring		First period	Patrick Bajkov (14) - pp 14:43
11:26 - Aleksi Heponiemi (4)		Second period	No scoring
No scoring		Third period	Connor Dewar (10) - 1:49
Stuart Skinner (23 saves / 25 shots)		Goalie stats	Carter Hart (34 saves / 35 shots)

May 5	Swift Current Broncos	4 – 3	OT	Everett Silvertips	Credit Union iPlex	Recap
No scoring		First period		Matt Fonteyne (7) - 3:14; Martin Faško-Rudáš (5) - 10:11; Riley Sutter (7) - 14:26
8:17 - Matteo Gennaro (9)		Second period		No scoring
6:22 - Colby Sissons (4); 18:23 - Tyler Steenbergen (12)		Third period		No scoring
9:27 - Giorgio Estephan (12)		First overtime period		No scoring
Stuart Skinner (40 saves / 43 shots)		Goalie stats		Carter Hart (34 saves / 38 shots)

May 8	Everett Silvertips	2 – 3	OT	Swift Current Broncos	Angel of the Winds Arena	Recap
15:44 - Riley Sutter (8); 18:35 - Matt Fonteyne (8)		First period		Glenn Gawdin (10) - 14:44
No scoring		Second period		No scoring
No scoring		Third period		Glenn Gawdin (11) - sh - 16:43
No scoring		First overtime period		Glenn Gawdin (12) - 2:40
Carter Hart (29 saves / 32 shots)		Goalie stats		Stuart Skinner (37 saves / 39 shots)

May 9	Everett Silvertips	0 – 1	Swift Current Broncos	Angel of the Winds Arena	Recap
No scoring		First period	No scoring
No scoring		Second period	Colby Sissons (5) - pp - 14:35
No scoring		Third period	No scoring
Carter Hart (18 saves / 19 shots)		Goalie stats	Stuart Skinner (32 saves / 32 shots)

May 11	Swift Current Broncos	3 – 6	Everett Silvertips	Credit Union iPlex	Recap
17:50 - pp - Glenn Gawdin (13)		First period	Wyatte Wylie (2) - pp - 6:19; Matt Fonteyne (9) - 16:07
6:37 - Glenn Gawdin (14)		Second period	No scoring
12:51 - Noah King (1)		Third period	Sean Richards (4) - 4:48; Riley Sutter (9) - 6:09; Connor Dewar (11) - en - 18:20; Connor Dewar (12) - en - 19:31
Stuart Skinner (34 saves / 38 shots)		Goalie stats	Carter Hart (21 saves / 24 shots)

May 13	Everett Silvertips	0 – 3	Swift Current Broncos	Angel of the Winds Arena	Recap
No scoring		First period	Giorgio Estephan (13) - 6:41; Aleksi Heponiemi (5) - 19:59
No scoring		Second period	No scoring
No scoring		Third period	Beck Malenstyn (4) - en - 19:53
Carter Hart (22 saves / 24 shots)		Goalie stats	Stuart Skinner (31 saves / 31 shots)

Swift Current wins series 4 – 2

== Playoff scoring leaders ==
Note: GP = Games played; G = Goals; A = Assists; Pts = Points; PIM = Penalty minutes

Player	Team	GP	G	A	Pts	PIM
Brad Morrison	Lethbridge Hurricanes	16	16	21	37	6
Michael Rasmussen	Tri-City Americans	14	16	17	33	4
Glenn Gawdin	Swift Current Broncos	24	14	18	32	32
Aleksi Heponiemi	Swift Current Broncos	26	5	25	30	2
Garrett Pilon	Everett Silvertips	22	11	17	28	8
Morgan Geekie	Tri-City Americans	14	17	10	27	4
Tyler Steenbergen	Swift Current Broncos	26	12	15	27	12
Connor Dewar	Everett Silvertips	22	12	14	26	24
Jordy Bellerive	Lethbridge Hurricanes	16	9	16	25	20
Patrick Bajkov	Everett Silvertips	22	14	9	23	18

== Playoff leading goaltenders ==
Note: GP = Games played; Mins = Minutes played; W = Wins; L = Losses; GA = Goals Allowed; SO = Shutouts; SV& = Save percentage; GAA = Goals against average

Player	Team	GP	Mins	W	L	GA	SO	Sv%	GAA
Stuart Skinner	Swift Current Broncos	26	1609	16	10	59	6	.932	2.20
Carter Hart	Everett Silvertips	22	1325	14	8	53	2	.921	2.40
Logan Flodell	Lethbridge Hurricanes	16	968	10	6	45	2	.906	2.79
Dawson Weatherill	Spokane Chiefs	5	284	2	3	14	0	.912	2.96
Ryan Kubic	Regina Pats	7	409	3	4	21	0	.891	3.08

== WHL awards ==
Ed Chynoweth Cup	WHL Champions	Swift Current Broncos	
Scotty Munro Memorial Trophy	Regular season champions	Moose Jaw Warriors	
Four Broncos Memorial Trophy	Player of the Year	Carter Hart	Everett Silvertips
Bob Clarke Trophy	Top Scorer	Jayden Halbgewachs	Moose Jaw Warriors
Bill Hunter Memorial Trophy	Top Defenceman	Kale Clague	Moose Jaw Warriors
Jim Piggott Memorial Trophy	Rookie of the Year	Dylan Cozens	Lethbridge Hurricanes
Del Wilson Trophy	Top Goaltender	Carter Hart	Everett Silvertips
WHL Plus-Minus Award	Top Plus-Minus Rating	Glenn Gawdin	Swift Current Broncos
Brad Hornung Trophy	Most Sportsmanlike Player	Aleksi Heponiemi	Swift Current Broncos
Daryl K. (Doc) Seaman Trophy	Scholastic Player of the Year	Ty Smith	Spokane Chiefs
Jim Donlevy Memorial Trophy	Scholastic team of the Year	Saskatoon Blades	
Dunc McCallum Memorial Trophy	Coach of the Year	Emanuel Viveiros	Swift Current Broncos
Lloyd Saunders Memorial Trophy	Executive of the Year	Garry Davidson	Everett Silvertips
Allen Paradice Memorial Trophy	Top Official	Brett Iverson	
St. Clair Group Trophy	Marketing/Public Relations Award	Edmonton Oil Kings	
Doug Wickenheiser Memorial Trophy	Humanitarian of the Year	Ty Ronning	Vancouver Giants
WHL Playoff MVP	WHL Finals Most Valuable Player	Glenn Gawdin	Swift Current Broncos
Professional Hockey Achievement; Academic Recipient	Alumni Achievement Awards	Jerome Iginla	

=== All-Star teams ===
==== Eastern Conference ====
First Team		Pos.	Second Team	
Player	Team	Pos.	Player	Team
Logan Flodell	Lethbridge Hurricanes	G	Logan Thompson	Brandon Wheat Kings
Kale Clague	Moose Jaw Warriors	D	Josh Mahura	Regina Pats
David Quenneville	Medicine Hat Tigers	D	Colby Sissons	Swift Current Broncos
Jayden Halbgewachs	Moose Jaw Warriors	F	Tyler Steenbergen	Swift Current Broncos
Glenn Gawdin	Swift Current Broncos	F	Jordy Bellerive	Lethbridge Hurricanes
Aleksi Heponiemi	Swift Current Broncos	F	Brayden Burke	Moose Jaw Warriors

==== Western Conference ====
First Team		Pos.	Second Team	
Player	Team	Pos.	Player	Team
Carter Hart	Everett Silvertips	G	David Tendeck	Vancouver Giants
Cal Foote	Kelowna Rockets	D	Henri Jokiharju	Portland Winterhawks
Ty Smith	Spokane Chiefs	D	Juuso Valimaki	Tri-City Americans
Matthew Phillips	Victoria Royals	F	Ty Ronning	Vancouver Giants
Cody Glass	Portland Winterhawks	F	Dillon Dubé	Kelowna Rockets
Jaret Anderson-Dolan	Spokane Chiefs	F	Patrick Bajkov	Everett Silvertips

== See also ==
- List of WHL seasons
- 2017–18 OHL season
- 2017–18 QMJHL season
- 2017 in ice hockey
- 2018 in ice hockey

Preceded by 2016–17 WHL season	WHL seasons	Succeeded by 2018–19 WHL season
