= Victoria Royals =

Western Hockey League team in Victoria, British Columbia

- City: Victoria, British Columbia, Canada
- League: Western Hockey League
- Conference: Western
- Division: B.C.
- Founded: 2006
- Home arena: Save-On-Foods Memorial Centre
- Colours: Royal blue, silver, white, black
- Owner: Graham Lee (Chairman - GSL Group)
- General manager: Jake Heisinger
- Head coach: James Patrick
- Website: chl.ca/whl-royals/

Franchise history
- 2006–2011: Chilliwack Bruins
- 2011–present: Victoria Royals

Championships
- Regular season titles: 1 (2015–16)

Current uniform

The Victoria Royals are a Canadian major junior ice hockey team based in Victoria, British Columbia. The Royals play in the B.C. Division of the Western Conference in the Western Hockey League (WHL). The team began play during the 2011–12 season after the league announced the relocation of the Chilliwack Bruins to Victoria. It marked the return of the WHL to Vancouver Island, 17 years after the departure of the Victoria Cougars. The Royals play their home games at the Save-On-Foods Memorial Centre.

== History ==
Victoria was left without a WHL team when the Cougars franchise relocated to Prince George in 1994. The city acquired a professional ECHL—the Victoria Salmon Kings—in 2004 when the Save-On-Foods Memorial Centre was opened, but the city had made inquiries about returning the WHL to Vancouver Island in the past.

While two minority owners of the Chilliwack Bruins hoped to purchase the team and keep it in Chilliwack following the 2010–11 season, they were outvoted by the remaining partners who opted to sell the team to a group planning to relocate the franchise. On April 20, 2011, the WHL announced the approval of the sale and the relocation of the Bruins to Victoria. The relocation was brought about partially by the WHL's desire to protect the Victoria market, as the league feared that a potential summer relocation of the National Hockey League's Atlanta Thrashers to Winnipeg could result in the American Hockey League's Manitoba Moose moving to Victoria.

The Royals got off to a relatively strong start in Victoria, making the playoffs in each of the team's first eight seasons; the team was on track to make the playoffs for a ninth straight year in 2019–20 when the season was cut short by the COVID-19 pandemic. The team's best season came in 2015–16. The Royals reached the 50-win mark for the first time and secured their first Scotty Munro Memorial Trophy as the league's best team in the regular season. They ultimately lost their second-round playoff series against the defending champion Kelowna Rockets; the Royals were leading in the seventh and deciding game when the Rockets tied the game with less than a second remaining in regulation, going on to win in overtime.

== Season-by-season record ==
Note: GP = Games played, W = Wins, L = Losses, OTL = Overtime losses, SOL = Shootout losses, GF = Goals for, GA = Goals against

Season	GP	W	L	OTL	SOL	GF	GA	Points	Finish	Playoffs
2011–12	72	24	41	3	4	233	325	55	4th B.C.	Lost Western Conference quarter-final (0–4, KAM)
2012–13	72	35	30	2	5	223	252	77	3rd B.C.	Lost Western Conference quarter-final (2–4, KAM)
2013–14	72	48	20	1	3	238	181	100	2nd B.C.	Won Western Conference quarter-final (4–0, SPO); Lost Western Conference semi-final (1–4, POR)
2014–15	72	39	29	3	1	244	219	82	2nd B.C.	Won Western Conference quarter-final (4–1, PRG); Lost Western Conference semi-final (1–4, KEL)
2015–16	72	50	16	3	3	281	166	106	1st B.C. 1st WHL	Won Western Conference quarter-final (4–2, SPO); Lost Western Conference semi-final (3–4 KEL)
2016–17	72	37	29	5	1	239	219	80	4th B.C.	Lost Western Conference quarter-final (2–4, EVT)
2017–18	72	39	27	4	2	287	264	84	2nd B.C.	Won Western Conference quarter-final (4–3, VAN); Lost Western Conference semi-final (0–4, TRI)
2018–19	68	34	30	2	2	199	227	72	2nd B.C.	Won Western Conference quarter-final (4–2, KAM); Lost Western Conference semi-final (0–4, VAN)
2019–20	64	34	24	6	2	176	190	72	2nd B.C.	Cancelled due to COVID-19 pandemic
2020–21	22	3	17	1	1	48	96	8	5th B.C.	No playoffs due to COVID-19 pandemic
2021–22	68	23	39	5	1	193	275	52	5th B.C.	Did not qualify
2022–23	68	17	43	6	2	199	323	42	5th B.C.	Did not qualify
2023–24	68	29	30	5	4	221	272	67	4th B.C.	Lost Western Conference quarter-final (0–4, POR)
2024–25	68	40	19	4	7	272	218	91	1st B.C.	Won Western Conference quarterfinal (4–1, TRI); Lost Western Conference semifinal (2–4, SPO)
2025–26	68	28	30	6	4	209	253	91	5th B.C.	Did not Qualify

=== WHL Championship history ===
- Scotty Munro Memorial Trophy (1): 2015-16
- Regular season division titles (2): 2015–16, 2024–25

== Players ==
=== Team captains ===
- Hayden Rintoul, 2011–2012
- Tyler Stahl, 2012–2013
- Jordan Fransoo, 2013–2014
- Joe Hicketts, 2014–2016
- Ryan Gagnon, 2016–2017
- Matthew Phillips, 2017–2018
- Phillip Schultz, 2019–2020
- Tarun Fizer, 2021–2022
- Gannon Laroque, 2022–2023
- Justin Kipkie, 2024–2025
- Reggie Newman, 2025–2026
- Miles Cooper, 2026-present

=== NHL alumni ===
The following is a list of players from the Victoria Royals who have played in the National Hockey League.

- Noah Gregor
- Joe Hicketts
- Brayden Pachal
- Matthew Phillips
- Brayden Tracey

== Head coaches ==
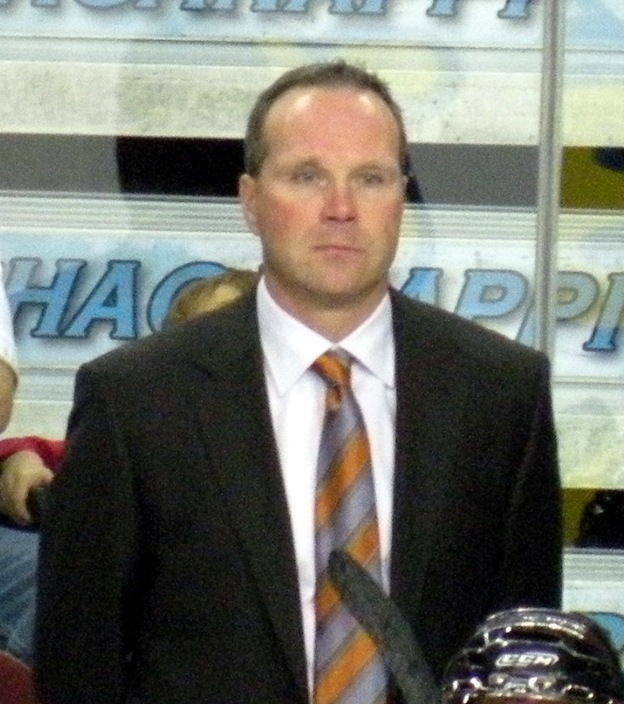
Dave Lowry coached the Royals for five seasons from 2012 to 2017.

Marc Habscheid served as the first head coach and general manager of the Royals during the team's inaugural season; in June 2012, he announced that he was leaving both positions. The Royals named Cam Hope as their new general manager. The Royals named Dave Lowry as head coach for the 2012–13 season. He coached the Royals for five seasons, leading the team to franchise highs in wins and points on the way to a Scotty Munro Memorial Trophy as WHL regular season champions in 2015–16. He left the club in 2017. In 2017, the Royals promoted assistant coach Dan Price to the head coaching position. Price became the third head coach in franchise history.

On November 6, 2023, following a 6–3 loss to the Wenatchee Wild, the Royals dismissed Price and named former Winnipeg Ice head coach James Patrick the fifth head coach in franchise history.

=== List of coaches ===
#	Coach	Years	GC
1	Marc Habscheid	2011–2012	72
2	Dave Lowry	2012–2017	360
3	Dan Price	2017–2023	
4	James Patrick	2023–present	

== Awards and honours ==
=== Team ===
Scotty Munro Memorial Trophy
WHL Regular Season Champion

- 2015–16

St. Clair Group Trophy
WHL Marketing/Business Award

- 2015–16

WHL Scholastic Team of the Year

- 2016–17

=== Individual ===
Brad Hornung Trophy
WHL Most Sportsmanlike Player

- Tyler Soy: 2015–16

Jim Piggott Memorial Trophy
WHL Rookie of the Year

- Matthew Phillips: 2015–16

Dunc McCallum Memorial Trophy
WHL Coach of the Year

- Dave Lowry (2): 2013–14, 2015–16
- James Patrick: 2024–25

Lloyd Saunders Memorial Trophy
WHL Executive of the Year

- Cam Hope: 2013–14

WHL Western Conference First All-Star Team

- Joe Hicketts: 2015–16
- Matthew Phillips: 2016–17, 2017–18

WHL Western Conference Second All-Star Team

- Joe Hicketts: 2014–15
- Tyler Soy: 2015–16
- Scott Walford: 2018–19
- Justin Kipkie: 2024–25

WHL B.C. Division First All-Star Team

- Gannon Laroque: 2021–22
- Bailey Peach: 2021–22
- Justin Kipkie: 2023–24

WHL B.C. Division Second All-Star Team

- Tarun Fizer: 2021–22

== See also ==
- List of ice hockey teams in British Columbia
