= Cole Kehler =

Canadian ice hockey player (born 1997)

- Born: December 17, 1997 (age 28) Altona, Manitoba, Canada
- Height: 6 ft 4 in (193 cm)
- Weight: 205 lb (93 kg; 14 st 9 lb)
- Position: Goaltender
- Catches: Right
- NHL team Former teams: Winnipeg Jets; Ontario Reign; Manitoba Moose
- NHL draft: Undrafted
- Playing career: 2018–present

Cole Kehler (born December 17, 1997) is a Canadian professional ice hockey goaltender who is currently the emergency back-up goaltender for the Winnipeg Jets of the National Hockey League (NHL). He most recently played professionally with the Utah Grizzlies in the ECHL.

== Playing career ==
After being selected by the Kamloops Blazers of the Western Hockey League in the 2012 Bantam Draft, Kehler competed for the starting goaltender position with Connor Ingram during the 2014–15 season. After two partial seasons of poor performance with Kamloops, Kehler was assigned to play for the Merritt Centennials of the British Columbia Hockey League and was named the starting goalie.

The Blazers traded Kehler's WHL rights to the Portland Winterhawks in August, 2016. He played for Portland between 2016 and 2018, guiding the Winterhawks to playoff appearances in both seasons. After attending the Winnipeg Jets Skills Development Camp in 2017, Kehler signed a professional contract with the Los Angeles Kings.

Kehler made his professional debut in 2018 with the Kings secondary affiliate, the Manchester Monarchs of the ECHL.

After leaving the Kings organization as a free agent, as he was not tendered a qualifying offer, Kehler was later offered a professional tryout to attend training camp with the Winnipeg Jets. He released by the Jets following the conclusion of training camp and later signed a one-year AHL contract with affiliate, the Manitoba Moose, on January 24, 2021. Kehler appeared in 1 game with the Moose, before he was signed by the Winnipeg Jets for the remainder of the season to add insurance depth on April 9, 2021.

In the following off-season as a pending restricted free agent, Kehler's rights were not retained by the Jets after failing to receive a qualifying offer. As a free agent, Kehler signed a contract in the ECHL to join the Rapid City Rush to open the 2021–22 season. Following two games with the Rush, Kehler was traded to the Cincinnati Cyclones on November 30, 2021. He appeared in 4 games with the Cyclones before he was traded a month later on December 30, to the Utah Grizzlies.

After playing in the ECHL, Kehler played senior men's hockey with the Altona Maroons of the South Eastern Manitoba Hockey League, and eventually became their goaltending coach before leaving to join the Winnipeg Jets as their emergency back-up goaltender ahead of the 2026–27 NHL season.

== Career statistics ==
| | | | Regular season | | | | | | | | | Playoffs |
| Season | Team | League | GP | W | L | T/OT | MIN | GA | SO | GAA | SV% | GP | W | L | MIN | GA | SO | GAA | SV% |
|---|---|---|---|---|---|---|---|---|---|---|---|---|---|---|---|---|---|---|---|
| 2013–14 | Kamloops Blazers | WHL | 11 | 1 | 4 | 0 | 430 | 37 | 0 | 5.16 | .857 | — | — | — | — | — | — | — | — |
| 2014–15 | Kamloops Blazers | WHL | 21 | 3 | 14 | 2 | 1123 | 87 | 0 | 4.65 | .855 | — | — | — | — | — | — | — | — |
| 2015–16 | Merritt Centennials | BCHL | 43 | 18 | 24 | 0 | 2454 | 157 | 0 | 3.84 | .898 | — | — | — | — | — | — | — | — |
| 2016–17 | Portland Winterhawks | WHL | 56 | 32 | 17 | 3 | 3151 | 163 | 2 | 3.10 | .910 | 11 | 5 | 6 | 604 | 42 | 0 | 4.17 | .897 |
| 2017–18 | Portland Winterhawks | WHL | 53 | 30 | 16 | 4 | 3079 | 142 | 4 | 2.77 | .909 | 12 | 5 | 5 | 709 | 40 | 0 | 3.39 | .897 |
| 2018–19 | Manchester Monarchs | ECHL | 17 | 7 | 8 | 0 | 862 | 61 | 0 | 4.25 | .883 | 1 | 0 | 0 | 33 | 0 | 0 | 0.00 | 1.000 |
| 2019–20 | Fort Wayne Komets | ECHL | 31 | 14 | 10 | 4 | 1709 | 87 | 2 | 3.05 | .901 | — | — | — | — | — | — | — | — |
| 2019–20 | Ontario Reign | AHL | 1 | 0 | 0 | 0 | 8 | 0 | 0 | 0.00 | 1.000 | — | — | — | — | — | — | — | — |
| 2020–21 | Manitoba Moose | AHL | 3 | 2 | 1 | 0 | 119 | 5 | 0 | 2.52 | .861 | — | — | — | — | — | — | — | — |
| 2021–22 | Rapid City Rush | ECHL | 2 | 1 | 0 | 1 | 127 | 9 | 0 | 4.25 | .830 | — | — | — | — | — | — | — | — |
| 2021–22 | Cincinnati Cyclones | ECHL | 4 | 2 | 1 | 0 | 219 | 13 | 0 | 3.57 | .871 | — | — | — | — | — | — | — | — |
| 2021–22 | Utah Grizzlies | ECHL | 6 | 3 | 2 | 1 | 365 | 20 | 0 | 3.29 | .898 | — | — | — | — | — | — | — | — |
| 2022–23 | Altona Maroons | SEMHL | 17 | - | - | - | 995 | 115 | 0 | 6.93 | .887 | — | — | — | — | — | — | — | — |
| 2023–24 | Altona Maroons | SEMHL | 18 | - | - | - | 1035 | 98 | 0 | 5.68 | .896 | — | — | — | — | — | — | — | — |
| AHL totals | | | 4 | 2 | 1 | 0 | 127 | 5 | 0 | 2.35 | .881 | — | — | — | — | — | — | — | — |
