= Evan Weinger =

American ice hockey player

- Born: April 18, 1997 (age 29) Los Angeles, California, U.S.
- Height: 6 ft 0 in (183 cm)
- Weight: 194 lb (88 kg; 13 st 12 lb)
- Position: Right wing
- Shoots: Right
- team Former teams: Free agent Vienna Capitals; San Jose Barracuda; HC TPS; San Diego Gulls; IK Oskarshamn; Södertälje SK
- NHL draft: Undrafted
- Playing career: 2018–present

Evan Weinger (born April 18, 1997) is an American professional ice hockey winger who is currently an unrestricted free agent. He last played with Södertälje SK of the HockeyAllsvenskan. As an undrafted player, he was signed out of major junior hockey by the San Jose Sharks organization.

== Playing career ==
=== Amateur ===
Weinger was born on April 18, 1997, in Los Angeles, California. He began his minor hockey career with the Los Angeles Jr. Kings in the Tier 1 Elite Hockey League before being drafted in the 13th round of the 2012 Western Hockey League (WHL) by the Portland Winterhawks. He remained with the Jr. Kings for the 2013–14 season, recording 12 goals and 14 assists, before signing with the Winterhawks. During his rookie season, Career led team rookies in scoring with seven goals and 19 assists for 26 points in 61 games. As a result, he was ranked 161st amongst North American skaters by the NHL Central Scouting Bureau prior to the 2015 NHL entry draft.

After going undrafted into the NHL twice, Weinger was signed to an Amateur tryout contract by his hometown Los Angeles Kings and participated in their 2017 training camp. Upon being returned to the WHL, Weinger was traded to the Brandon Wheat Kings in exchange for a third round draft choice in the 2018 WHL Bantam Draft on October 10, 2017. At the time of the trade, Weinger had played in 187 regular season games and amassed 37 goals, 89 points and 97 penalty minutes. During the 2017–18 season, Weinger recorded 50 points in 55 games and signed an American Hockey League (AHL) contract with the San Jose Barracuda to begin his professional career.

=== Professional ===
In his first professional season in San Jose, Weinger played in 60 games and recorded 22 points while also spending time on their top-10 penalty killing unit. When the Barracuda qualified for the 2018 Calder Cup playoffs, he played in four games and tied the team lead in points with four. Following his rookie season, Weinger signed a one-year contract extension on May 28, 2019.

During the shortened 2019–20 season, Weinger led the team in shorthanded goals and points-per-game, and finished second on the team in Plus–minus with +12. As a result of his second successful season, Weinger signed another contract extension to remain with the Barracuda. While the league was paused due to the COVID-19 pandemic, Weinger was loaned to the HC TPS in the Liiga. He played in nine games for the team, recording one goal, before returning to the AHL. On February 13, 2021, Weinger played in his 100th career AHL game.

Following his fifth professional season in the AHL, Weinger halted his North American career in signing his first contract abroad by agreeing to a one-year contract with Austrian based club, the Vienna Capitals of the ICE Hockey League, on May 30, 2023.

== Career statistics ==
			Regular season					Playoffs
Season	Team	League	GP	G	A	Pts	PIM	GP	G	A	Pts	PIM
2013–14	Los Angeles Jr. Kings	T1EHL	35	12	14	26	38	—	—	—	—	—
2014–15	Portland Winterhawks	WHL	61	7	19	26	27	17	1	5	6	2
2015–16	Portland Winterhawks	WHL	63	10	15	25	33	4	0	0	0	0
2016–17	Portland Winterhawks	WHL	62	20	18	38	37	9	2	2	4	8
2017–18	Portland Winterhawks	WHL	1	0	0	0	0	—	—	—	—	—
2017–18	Brandon Wheat Kings	WHL	64	31	26	57	23	11	3	4	7	6
2018–19	San Jose Barracuda	AHL	60	11	11	22	16	4	2	2	4	0
2019–20	San Jose Barracuda	AHL	38	9	11	20	2	—	—	—	—	—
2020–21	HC TPS	Liiga	9	1	0	1	4	—	—	—	—	—
2020–21	San Jose Barracuda	AHL	28	4	4	8	25	4	1	2	3	0
2021–22	San Jose Barracuda	AHL	60	12	12	24	18	—	—	—	—	—
2022–23	Tulsa Oilers	ECHL	9	6	5	11	10	—	—	—	—	—
2022–23	San Diego Gulls	AHL	39	3	5	8	28	—	—	—	—	—
Liiga totals			9	1	0	1	4	—	—	—	—	—
