= Beck Malenstyn =

Canadian ice hockey player (born 1998)

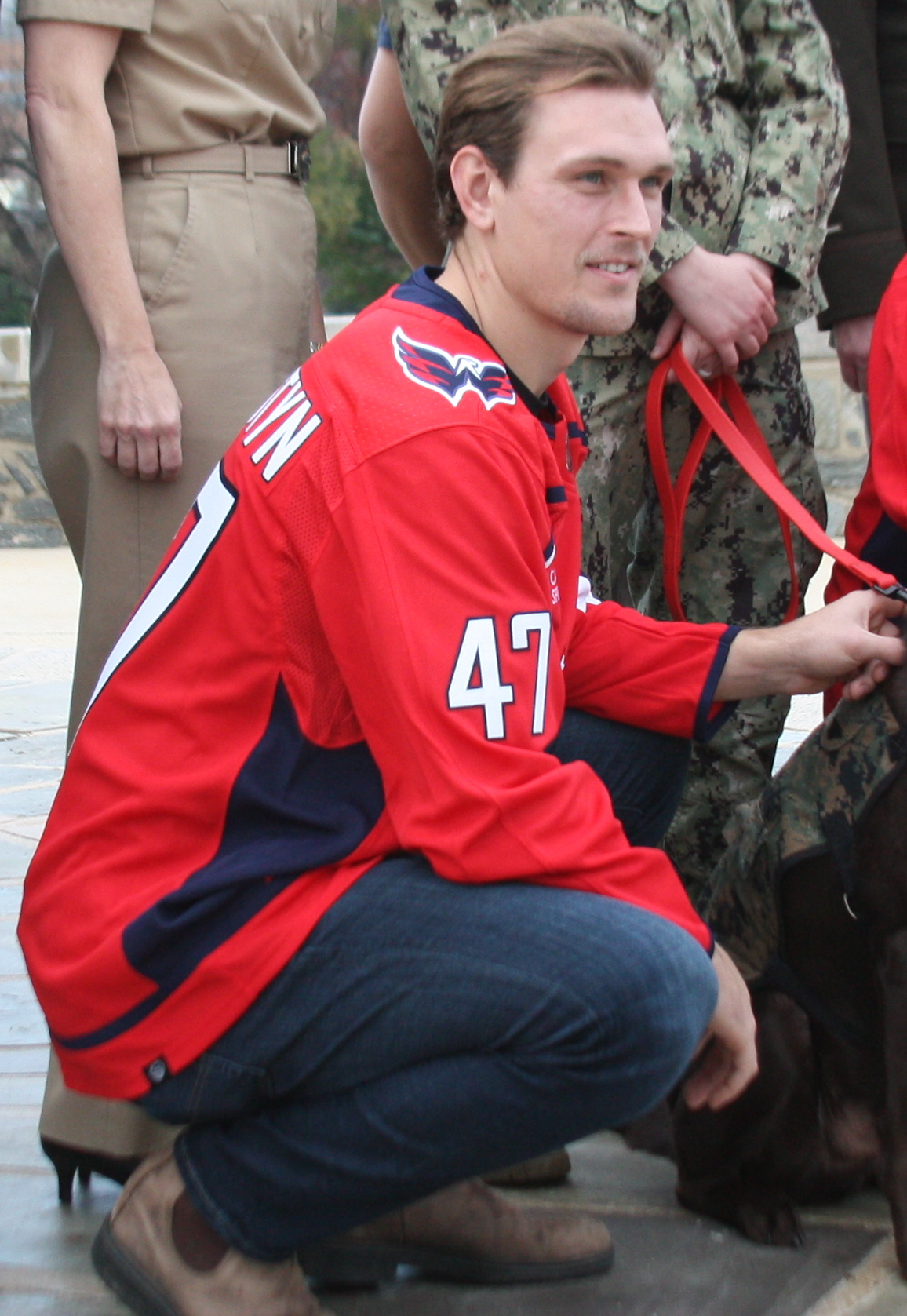
- Malenstyn with the Washington Capitals in 2023
- Born: February 4, 1998 (age 28) Delta, British Columbia, Canada
- Height: 6 ft 3 in (191 cm)
- Weight: 200 lb (91 kg; 14 st 4 lb)
- Position: Left wing
- Shoots: Left
- NHL team Former teams: Buffalo Sabres; Washington Capitals
- NHL draft: 145th overall, 2016; Washington Capitals
- Playing career: 2018–present

Beck Malenstyn /ˈmælɛnstaɪn/ (born February 4, 1998) is a Canadian ice hockey player who is a left winger for the Buffalo Sabres of the National Hockey League (NHL). He was selected 145th overall in the 2016 NHL entry draft by the Washington Capitals.

== Early life ==
Malenstyn was born on February 4, 1998, in Delta, British Columbia, Canada.

== Playing career ==
=== Minors ===
Growing up in British Columbia, Malenstyn spent three seasons with the Okanagan Hockey Academy on their OHA Bantam Prep team and OHA Midget Prep team. While serving as team captain, he recorded a team-leading 119 points, including a team-high 62 goals, along with 108 penalty minutes in 57 games played. As a result of his play, Malenstyn was drafted in the first round, 18th overall, by the Calgary Hitmen in the 2013 Western Hockey League (WHL) Bantam Draft. He returned to Okanagan for the 2013–14 season where he helped them capture the Canadian Sport School Hockey League Midget Prep Division Championship by recording 26 points in 21 games.

=== Major junior ===
Malenstyn joined the Hitmen for his rookie season during their 2014–15 campaign at the age of 16. He played 11 games, and recorded two goals, before being chosen to represent Team Canada at the 2014 World Under-17 Hockey Challenge. Upon returning to the Hitmen, Malenstyn tallied eight goals and four assists in 51 games.

Prior to his sophomore season, Malenstyn and his teammate Jake Bean were selected to represent Team Canada at the 2015 Ivan Hlinka Memorial Tournament. Malenstyn finished the tournament with three points in five games, including a goal in Canada's 7–3 over Sweden to earn a gold medal. Upon joining the Hitmen for their 2015–16 season, he was named to the National Hockey League’s Players to Watch list for November in advance of the 2016 NHL Draft. By January 2016, Malenstyn was ranked 124th amongst all North American skaters after he recorded 20 points in 44 games. He was later named to Canada men's national under-18 ice hockey team pre-competition roster for the 2016 IIHF World U18 Championships. Malenstyn concluded his sophomore season with 25 points in 70 games and earned the teams' Chrysler Canada Inc. Scholastic Player Award.

During the offseason, Malenstyn was drafted 145th overall by the Washington Capitals at the 2016 NHL entry draft. He was subsequently invited to the Capitals training camp but was released and returned to the Hitmen prior to the start of the 2016–17 season.

In November 2017, Malenstyn, a fifth-round pick, and team captain Matteo Gennaro were traded to the Swift Current Broncos in exchange for three players, the rights to two more players, and a second-round pick. Malenstyn won the 2018 WHL Championship as a member of the Swift Current Broncos.

=== Professional ===
On November 20, 2019, Malenstyn was recalled from the Hershey Bears to the Capitals and made his NHL debut that night against the New York Rangers.

In December 2020, he tore his Achilles tendon which required surgery and he was expected to miss six to eight months to recover, ruling him out for the entirety of the 2020–21 season.

Following his first full season in the NHL, as a pending restricted free agent, Malenstyn was traded during the second round of the 2024 NHL entry draft to the Buffalo Sabres in exchange for a second-round pick on June 29, 2024. On July 23, he signed a two-year, $2.7 million contract with the Sabres to avoid salary arbitration.

== Career statistics ==
=== Regular season and playoffs ===
			Regular season					Playoffs
Season	Team	League	GP	G	A	Pts	PIM	GP	G	A	Pts	PIM
2013–14	Calgary Hitmen	WHL	5	0	3	3	4	—	—	—	—	—
2014–15	Calgary Hitmen	WHL	51	8	4	12	25	11	1	1	2	4
2015–16	Calgary Hitmen	WHL	70	8	17	25	47	5	2	1	3	2
2016–17	Calgary Hitmen	WHL	70	32	24	56	60	4	0	0	0	2
2017–18	Calgary Hitmen	WHL	4	0	3	3	0	—	—	—	—	—
2017–18	Swift Current Broncos	WHL	38	17	12	29	28	26	4	7	11	18
2018–19	Hershey Bears	AHL	74	7	9	16	66	9	0	2	2	6
2019–20	Hershey Bears	AHL	46	7	8	15	20	—	—	—	—	—
2019–20	Washington Capitals	NHL	3	0	0	0	0	—	—	—	—	—
2021–22	Hershey Bears	AHL	65	10	6	16	20	3	1	0	1	0
2021–22	Washington Capitals	NHL	12	1	0	1	9	—	—	—	—	—
2022–23	Hershey Bears	AHL	40	6	4	10	23	20	4	4	8	12
2022–23	Washington Capitals	NHL	9	1	1	2	2	—	—	—	—	—
2023–24	Washington Capitals	NHL	81	6	15	21	25	4	0	0	0	2
2024–25	Buffalo Sabres	NHL	76	4	6	10	29	—	—	—	—	—
2025–26	Buffalo Sabres	NHL	81	7	7	14	38	13	1	2	3	8
NHL totals			262	19	29	48	103	17	1	2	3	10

=== International ===
Year	Team	Event	Result	GP	G	A	Pts	PIM
2015	Canada	IH18	1st place, gold medalist(s)	4	1	1	2	4
2016	Canada	U18	4th	7	1	2	3	4
Junior totals				11	2	3	5	8

== Awards and honours ==
Award	Year
AHL
Calder Cup	2023
