= Michael Rasmussen (ice hockey) =

Canadian ice hockey player (born 1999)

- Born: April 17, 1999 (age 27) Vancouver, British Columbia, Canada
- Height: 6 ft 6 in (198 cm)
- Weight: 222 lb (101 kg; 15 st 12 lb)
- Position: Centre
- Shoots: Left
- NHL team Former teams: Detroit Red Wings; Graz99ers
- NHL draft: 9th overall, 2017; Detroit Red Wings
- Playing career: 2018–present

Michael Rasmussen (born April 17, 1999) is a Canadian professional ice hockey player who is a centre for the Detroit Red Wings of the National Hockey League (NHL). Rasmussen was drafted ninth overall by the Red Wings in the 2017 NHL entry draft. He was born in Vancouver, and grew up in the neighboring suburb of Surrey.

== Playing career ==
Rasmussen was selected seventh overall by the Tri-City Americans in the 2014 WHL bantam draft. During the 2015–16 season in his rookie season, he recorded 18 goals and 25 assists in 63 games. During the 2016–17 season, he was limited to 50 out of 70 games played due to injury. He recorded 32 goals and 23 assists, including a team-best 15 power-play goals, which tied for sixth most in the WHL.

Leading up to the NHL draft, Rasmussen was ranked the no. 5 North American skater by NHL Central Scouting. Craig Button of TSN described him as a solid player with size that can score at the net.

On June 23, 2017, Rasmussen was drafted ninth overall by the Detroit Red Wings in the 2017 NHL entry draft. On August 5, the Red Wings signed Rasmussen to a three-year, entry-level contract.

Rasmussen made his NHL debut for the Red Wings on October 4, 2018, during a 3–2 overtime loss to the Columbus Blue Jackets. On October 8, Rasmussen recorded his first career NHL point, assisting on a goal by Tyler Bertuzzi during a 3–2 shootout loss to the Anaheim Ducks. On October 30, Rasmussen scored his first career NHL goal against Joonas Korpisalo of the Columbus Blue Jackets in a 5–3 win.

Due to the delayed start to the 2020-21 NHL season, Rasmussen was loaned to the Graz99ers of the ICE Hockey League (ICEHL). He appeared in 18 games in the ICEHL with the 99ers, recording 11 assists and 16 points, before returning to the Red Wings organization.

On July 22, 2021, Rasmussen signed a three-year, $4.38 million contract extension with the Red Wings. He reached double-digits in goals in each of the next three seasons. He set career highs in assists (19) and points (29) in 56 games with the Red Wings during the 2022–23 season.

On February 20, 2024, Rasmussen signed a four-year, $12.8 million contract extension with the Red Wings.

== International play ==
Rasmussen represented Canada Black at the 2015 World U-17 Hockey Challenge, where he recorded two goals and one assist in five games. Rasmussen represented Canada junior team at the 2016 Ivan Hlinka Memorial Tournament, where he recorded one goal and three assists in four games.

== Personal life ==
Rasmussen's parents are Denise and Paul and he has two older sisters, Jaclyn and Samantha.

== Career statistics ==
=== Regular season and playoffs ===
			Regular season					Playoffs
Season	Team	League	GP	G	A	Pts	PIM	GP	G	A	Pts	PIM
2014–15	Okanagan Hockey Academy	CSSHL	28	27	23	50	36	3	3	5	8	4
2014–15	Penticton Vees	BCHL	1	0	0	0	0	—	—	—	—	—
2014–15	Tri-City Americans	WHL	1	0	0	0	2	3	0	0	0	0
2015–16	Tri-City Americans	WHL	63	18	25	43	37	—	—	—	—	—
2016–17	Tri-City Americans	WHL	50	32	23	55	50	—	—	—	—	—
2017–18	Tri-City Americans	WHL	47	31	28	59	40	14	16	17	33	4
2018–19	Detroit Red Wings	NHL	62	8	10	18	29	—	—	—	—	—
2018–19	Grand Rapids Griffins	AHL	3	2	0	2	0	—	—	—	—	—
2019–20	Grand Rapids Griffins	AHL	35	7	15	22	20	—	—	—	—	—
2020–21	Graz99ers	ICEHL	18	5	11	16	42	—	—	—	—	—
2020–21	Detroit Red Wings	NHL	40	3	9	12	26	—	—	—	—	—
2020–21	Grand Rapids Griffins	AHL	7	2	4	6	6	—	—	—	—	—
2021–22	Detroit Red Wings	NHL	80	15	12	27	66	—	—	—	—	—
2022–23	Detroit Red Wings	NHL	56	10	19	29	43	—	—	—	—	—
2023–24	Detroit Red Wings	NHL	75	13	20	33	47	—	—	—	—	—
2024–25	Detroit Red Wings	NHL	77	11	10	21	24	—	—	—	—	—
2025–26	Detroit Red Wings	NHL	64	6	8	14	8	—	—	—	—	—
NHL totals			454	66	88	154	243	—	—	—	—	—

=== International ===
Year	Team	Event	Result	GP	G	A	Pts	PIM
2015	Canada Black	U17	8th	5	2	1	3	16
2016	Canada	IH18	5th	4	1	3	4	8
Junior totals				9	3	4	7	24

Awards and achievements
Preceded by Dennis Cholowski	Detroit Red Wings first-round draft pick 2017	Succeeded by Filip Zadina
