= St. Clair Group Trophy =

The St. Clair Group Trophy is awarded annually by the Western Hockey League to its top public relations and marketing personnel. It has been handed out since 1989–90.

== List of winners ==
Season	Winner	Team
1989–90	Jeff Chynoweth	Lethbridge Hurricanes
1990–91	Bill Lee	Seattle Thunderbirds
1991–92	Mark Dennis	Tacoma Rockets
1992–93	Rick Dillabough	Brandon Wheat Kings
1993–94	Mark Miller	Portland Winter Hawks
1994–95	Herm Hordal	Saskatoon Blades
1995–96	Dave Pier	Spokane Chiefs
1996–97	Pat Garrity	Red Deer Rebels
1997–98	Dane MacKinnon	Prince George Cougars
1998–99	Scott Clark	Regina Pats
1999–2000	Mike Jenkins	Prince Albert Raiders
2000–01	Mark Miles	Spokane Chiefs
2001–02	Greg McConkey	Red Deer Rebels
2002–03	(tie) Anne-Marie Hamilton	Kelowna Rockets
2002–03	(tie) Reid Pedersen	Regina Pats
2003–04	Mark Stiles	Calgary Hitmen
2004–05	Roger Lemire	Vancouver Giants
2005–06	Dave Andjelic	Medicine Hat Tigers
2006–07	Bruce Vance	Prince Albert Raiders
2007–08	Kip Reghenas	Calgary Hitmen
2008-09	Mike Bortolussi	Medicine Hat Tigers
2009–10	Zoran Rajcic	Everett Silvertips
2010–11	Mike Moore	Calgary Hitmen
2011–12	Corey Nyhagen	Moose Jaw Warriors
2012–13	Dave Chyzowski	Kamloops Blazers
2013–14	Seattle Thunderbirds	
2014–15	Kelowna Rockets	
2015–16	Victoria Royals	
2016–17	Regina Pats	
2017–18	Edmonton Oil Kings	
2018–19	Everett Silvertips	
2019–20	Lethbridge Hurricanes	
2020–21	not awarded	
2021–22	Everett Silvertips	
2022–23	Spokane Chiefs	
2023–24	Edmonton Oil Kings	
2024–25	Spokane Chiefs	
2025–26	Portland Winterhawks	

|}
