= Dave Peterson Goalie of the Year Award =

Award presented by USA Hockey for best junior goaltender

The Dave Peterson Goalie of the Year Award is presented annually by USA Hockey (the governing body for amateur ice hockey in the United States) to the best American goaltender in junior ice hockey. It is USA Hockey's top award for the position of goaltender. The award is named for Dave Peterson, former director of coaching and player development for USA Hockey and coach of the United States men's national ice hockey team.

== List of winners ==
- 2001–02: Jimmy Howard – USNTDP Juniors
- 2002–03: Dominic Vicari – River City Lancers
- 2003–04: Cory Schneider – USNTDP Juniors
- 2004–05: Jeff Lerg – Omaha Lancers
- 2005–06: Alex Stalock – Cedar Rapids RoughRiders
- 2006–07: Jeremy Smith – Plymouth Whalers
- 2007–08: Drew Palmisano – Omaha Lancers
- 2008–09: Mike Lee – Fargo Force
- 2009–10: Jack Campbell – USNTDP Juniors
- 2010–11: John Gibson – USNTDP Juniors
- 2011–12: Ryan McKay – Green Bay Gamblers
- 2012–13: Charlie Lindgren – Sioux Falls Stampede
- 2013–14: Cal Petersen – Waterloo Blackhawks
- 2014–15: Eric Schierhorn – Muskegon Lumberjacks
- 2015–16: Hunter Miska – Dubuque Fighting Saints
- 2016–17: Keith Petruzzelli – Muskegon Lumberjacks
- 2017–18: Zach Driscoll – Omaha Lancers
- 2018–19: Isaiah Saville – Tri-City Storm
- 2019–20: Dustin Wolf – Everett Silvertips
- 2020–21: Jake Sibell – Aberdeen Wings
- 2021–22: Alex Tracy – Sioux City Musketeers
- 2022–23: Jacob Fowler – Youngstown Phantoms
- 2023–24: Hampton Slukynsky – Fargo Force
- 2024–25: Ryan Cameron – Lone Star Brahmas
- 2025–26: Caleb Heil – Madison Capitols
