= Justin Sourdif =

Canadian ice hockey player (born 2002)

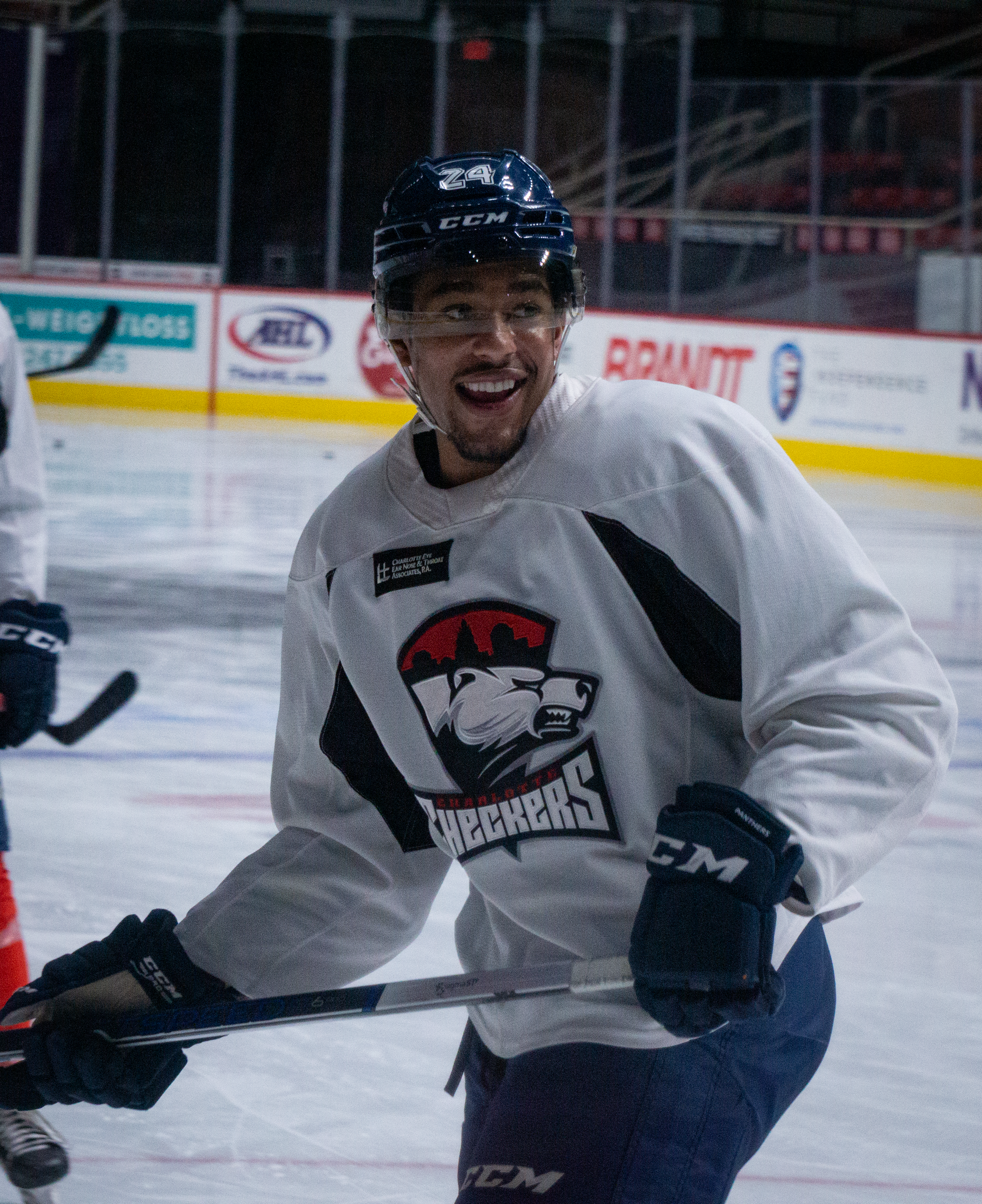
- Sourdif with the Charlotte Checkers in 2024
- Born: March 24, 2002 (age 24) Richmond, British Columbia, Canada
- Height: 5 ft 11 in (180 cm)
- Weight: 195 lb (88 kg; 13 st 13 lb)
- Position: Right wing
- Shoots: Right
- NHL team Former teams: Washington Capitals; Florida Panthers
- NHL draft: 87th overall, 2020; Florida Panthers
- Playing career: 2022–present

Justin Sourdif (born March 24, 2002) is a Canadian professional ice hockey player who is a right winger for the Washington Capitals of the National Hockey League (NHL).

== Playing career ==
=== Junior ===
Sourdif played in the Delta Hockey Academy before he was selected third overall by the Vancouver Giants of the Western Hockey League (WHL) in the 2017 WHL bantam draft. He began his major junior career with the Giants in the following 2017–18 season. In the 2018–19 season, Sourdif was a member of the Giants team that advanced all the way to the WHL championship, losing in seven games to the Prince Albert Raiders. During the pandemic-shortened 2019–20 season, Sourdif registered 54 points for the Giants. That season, Sourdif was among those chosen to the play in the Kubota CHL/NHL Top Prospects Game. He was selected as the Giants captain leading into his final junior season in 2021–22 and with the club out of playoff contention he was dealt to the Edmonton Oil Kings at the trade deadline in exchange for two first-round draft picks and a fellow junior player on January 17, 2022. Sourdif contributed with 14 points through 19 playoff games with the Oil Kings to help capture the Ed Chynoweth Cup as WHL champions. As WHL champions, the Oil Kings were one of the four teams at the 2022 Memorial Cup, however, the team finished last in the tournament.

=== Professional ===
Sourdif was selected in the third round, 87th overall, by the Florida Panthers of the National Hockey League (NHL) at the 2020 NHL entry draft held virtually on October 7, 2020. Sourdif was signed to a three-year, entry-level contract with the Florida Panthers on September 25, 2021. Sourdif began his professional career in the 2022–23 season, assigned by the Panthers to American Hockey League (AHL) affiliate, the Charlotte Checkers. Remaining with the Checkers for the entirety of the season, Sourdif showed offensive potential in posting seven goals and 24 points while limited to just 48 games through injury as a rookie.

In the 2023–24 season, following an impressive training camp with the Panthers, Sourdif was the final cut reassigned to the Checkers before the commencement of the season. Before joining the Checkers, Sourdif was recalled by the Panthers and was named to the opening season roster. He later made his NHL debut on October 16, 2023, in a 4–3 victory against the New Jersey Devils. He went scoreless in three games with the Panthers before he was reassigned to the AHL on October 23, 2023. On January 19, 2024, Sourdif was suspended for two games after committing an illegal check to head in a game versus the San Jose Barracuda. He had 12 goals and 38 points in 58 games with Charlotte.

Sourdif began the 2024–25 season on injured reserve with an undisclosed upper-body injury suffered during training camp. He was activated and assigned to Charlotte on October 23. Sourdif scored his first NHL goal on February 25, 2025, against the Nashville Predators.

On June 27, 2025, Sourdif was traded by the Panthers to the Washington Capitals in exchange for 2026 second-round and a 2027 sixth-round selection. On the following day, Sourdif was signed to a two-year, $1.65 million contract extension with the Capitals. On January 5, 2026, Sourdif recorded his first career NHL hat trick, scoring five points for the Capitals against the Anaheim Ducks. His effort tied the Capitals record for points scored in a single game by a rookie.

On September 15, 2026, the Capitals signed Sourdif to an eight-year, $50.8 million contract extension, carrying an average annual value of $6.35 million.

== International play ==
Sourdif was selected to play for Canada at the 2019 Hlinka Gretzky Cup. In five games he scored one goal and five points as the team won a silver medal.

== Personal life ==
Sourdif grew up in the Boundary Park area of Newton in Surrey, British Columbia. Sourdif's mother is from Ghana, where his grandparents still live. Sourdif began playing hockey with Surrey Minor Hockey and grew up a Capitals fan.

== Career statistics ==
=== Regular season and playoffs ===
			Regular season					Playoffs
Season	Team	League	GP	G	A	Pts	PIM	GP	G	A	Pts	PIM
2017–18	Valley West Hawks U18	BCEHL	35	23	50	73	57	3	2	3	5	4
2017–18	Vancouver Giants	WHL	4	0	0	0	0	7	0	0	0	0
2018–19	Vancouver Giants	WHL	64	23	23	46	31	17	2	6	8	16
2019–20	Vancouver Giants	WHL	57	26	28	54	44	—	—	—	—	—
2020–21	Vancouver Giants	WHL	22	11	23	34	29	—	—	—	—	—
2021–22	Edmonton Oil Kings	WHL	28	17	22	39	33	19	5	9	14	18
2021–22	Vancouver Giants	WHL	24	9	23	32	28	—	—	—	—	—
2022–23	Charlotte Checkers	AHL	48	7	17	24	32	6	1	1	2	4
2023–24	Charlotte Checkers	AHL	58	12	26	38	62	3	1	0	1	2
2023–24	Florida Panthers	NHL	3	0	0	0	0	—	—	—	—	—
2024–25	Charlotte Checkers	AHL	43	16	18	34	58	18	4	6	10	32
2024–25	Florida Panthers	NHL	1	1	0	1	0	—	—	—	—	—
2025–26	Washington Capitals	NHL	78	15	20	35	35	—	—	—	—	—
NHL totals			82	16	20	36	35	—	—	—	—	—

=== International ===
Year	Team	Event	Result	GP	G	A	Pts	PIM
2018	Canada Red	U17	4th	6	1	2	3	4
2019	Canada	HG18	2nd place, silver medalist(s)	5	1	4	5	2
Junior totals				11	2	6	8	6

== Awards and honours ==
Award	Year
WHL
Kubota CHL/NHL Top Prospects Game	2020
WHL Champion	2022
