= Gage Goncalves =

Canadian ice hockey player (born 2001)

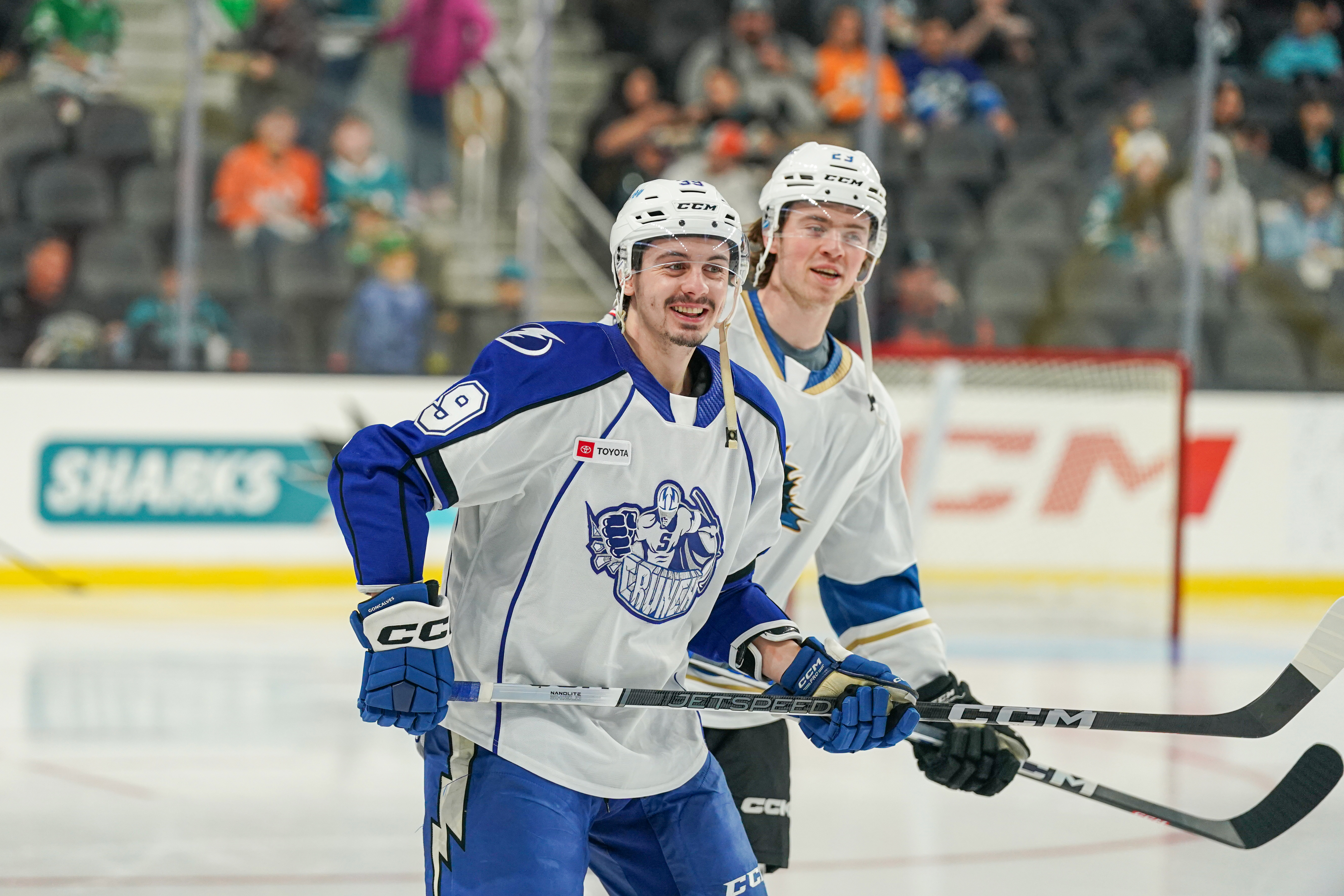
- Goncalves with the Syracuse Crunch in 2024
- Born: January 16, 2001 (age 25) Mission, British Columbia, Canada
- Height: 6 ft 0 in (183 cm)
- Weight: 189 lb (86 kg; 13 st 7 lb)
- Position: Forward
- Shoots: Left
- NHL team: Tampa Bay Lightning
- NHL draft: 62nd overall, 2020; Tampa Bay Lightning
- Playing career: 2021–present

Gage Goncalves (born January 16, 2001) is a Canadian professional ice hockey player who is a forward for the Tampa Bay Lightning of the National Hockey League (NHL).

== Playing career ==
Goncalves played bantam hockey at the Yale Hockey Academy in Abbotsford. Goncalves won the Canadian Sport School Bantam Hockey League while attending the academy. Goncalves went on to join the Everett Silvertips after going undrafted in the 2016 bantam draft.

On October 7, 2020, Goncalves was drafted with the 62nd pick in the second round of the 2020 NHL entry draft by the Tampa Bay Lightning.

In the 2020–21 WHL season Goncalves helped the Silvertips capture a U.S. Division title. In doing so Goncalves captured the top scorer award for the U.S. Division. In doing so, Goncalves recorded 34 points over 23 games. This was tied for third in the WHL that season.

On January 11, 2024, Goncalves was named to the 2024 American Hockey League All-Star Classic. Goncalves was named to the game after recording 7 goals, 23 assists and 30 points with the Syracuse Crunch. That same day Goncalves was called up to the Lightning. That night Goncalves made his NHL debut with the Tampa Bay Lightning. Goncalves helped the Lightning defeat the visiting New Jersey Devils 4–3 at Amalie Arena.

== Career statistics ==
			Regular season					Playoffs
Season	Team	League	GP	G	A	Pts	PIM	GP	G	A	Pts	PIM
2017–18	Chilliwack Chiefs	BCHL	4	1	1	2	4	—	—	—	—	—
2017–18	Everett Silvertips	WHL	1	0	0	0	2	—	—	—	—	—
2018–19	Everett Silvertips	WHL	67	1	14	15	26	10	2	4	6	2
2019–20	Everett Silvertips	WHL	60	33	38	71	44	—	—	—	—	—
2020–21	Everett Silvertips	WHL	23	12	22	34	12	—	—	—	—	—
2020–21	Syracuse Crunch	AHL	2	0	1	1	0	—	—	—	—	—
2021–22	Syracuse Crunch	AHL	70	17	15	32	39	5	0	1	1	0
2022–23	Syracuse Crunch	AHL	71	13	41	54	34	5	3	2	5	10
2023–24	Syracuse Crunch	AHL	69	13	45	58	43	7	1	5	6	0
2023–24	Tampa Bay Lightning	NHL	2	0	0	0	6	—	—	—	—	—
2024–25	Syracuse Crunch	AHL	14	5	13	18	10	—	—	—	—	—
2024–25	Tampa Bay Lightning	NHL	60	8	12	20	14	5	1	3	4	2
2025–26	Tampa Bay Lightning	NHL	74	11	22	33	41	7	1	2	3	0
NHL totals			136	19	34	53	61	12	2	5	7	2

== Awards and honours ==
Award	Year	Ref
AHL
All-Star Game	2024	
