= Adam Beckman =

Canadian ice hockey player (born 2001)

- Born: May 10, 2001 (age 25) Saskatoon, Saskatchewan, Canada
- Height: 6 ft 1 in (185 cm)
- Weight: 192 lb (87 kg; 13 st 10 lb)
- Position: Forward
- Shoots: Left
- NHL team (P) Cur. team Former teams: Colorado Avalanche; Colorado Eagles (AHL); Minnesota Wild
- NHL draft: 75th overall, 2019; Minnesota Wild
- Playing career: 2020–present

Adam Beckman (born May 10, 2001) is a Canadian professional ice hockey player who is a forward for the Colorado Eagles of the American Hockey League (AHL) while under contract to the Colorado Avalanche of the National Hockey League (NHL). He was drafted by the Minnesota Wild in the third round, 75th overall, of the 2019 NHL entry draft and made his NHL debut in October 2021.

== Early life ==
Beckman was born on May 10, 2001, in Saskatoon, Saskatchewan, to parents Janet and Dale. He is the youngest of three siblings, with an older brother and older sister. His sister Sydney also played ice hockey growing up, while his cousins Grace and Sophie are collegiate athletes for the Wisconsin Badgers.

== Playing career ==
=== Junior ===
Growing up in Saskatoon, Beckman played with the Saskatoon Frostbite U15 AA and Battleford Stars of the Saskatchewan Midget AAA League. During his time with the Stars, Beckman tallied 15 goals and 26 assists for 41 points through 44 games and was drafted 96th overall by the Spokane Chiefs in the 2016 Western Hockey League (WHL) Bantam Draft. Following the draft, he played in five pre-season games with the Chiefs before being reassigned to the Saskatoon Minor Hockey League (SMHL). He finished the 2017–18 season with the Battlefords Stars as the league’s leading scorer with 78 points.

Beckman joined the Chiefs for their 2018–19 season while attending Joel E. Ferris High School. Although he began the season with no ranking from the NHL Central Scouting Bureau, he began to lead the league in goals scored by a rookie with eight and caught the attention of NHL scouts and earned a "C" rating in November as a potential 4th-6th round pick in the draft. By April 2019, Beckman became the first rookie in franchise history to lead the team in goals since Daniel Bohac in the 1998-99 season. He finished the season with 62 points to rank second on the franchise's list of most goals by a first-year player. As a result, Beckman jumped up 10 spots in the NHL Central Scouting Final Rankings to rank 34th amongst North American skaters, Beckman was invited to participate in the NHL Scouting Combine. He was eventually drafted in the third round, 75th overall, by the Minnesota Wild.

Following the 2019 NHL Entry Draft, Beckman participated in their training camp and was selected to play in the CHL Canada/Russia Series. During a game against the Portland Winterhawks in January 2020, Beckman set a Spokane Chiefs franchise record for longest goal streak with 10. On March 5, 2020, Beckman became the first player in the league to reach 100 points during the 2019–20 season. At the time of this milestone, Beckman had recorded 44 goals and 56 assists through 60 games. He later added to that total and concluded the season with 48 goals and 59 assists for 107 points in 63 games to win the Bob Clarke Trophy as the WHL's top scorer. A month later, Beckman was again recognized for his career-best season with the WHL Western Conference Player of the Year and a selection onto the Western Conference First All-Star Team.

=== Professional ===
On October 9, 2021, Beckman was reassigned to the Wild's American Hockey League affiliate, the Iowa Wild, to begin the season. He was recalled to the NHL level at the end of October and made his NHL debut on October 30, against the Colorado Avalanche. Upon making his debut, Beckman became the fourth player during the 2021–22 season and 92nd in team history to make his NHL debut with the Wild.

On June 21, 2024, Beckman was traded to the New Jersey Devils in exchange for Graeme Clarke. In the following 2024–25 season, Beckman was assigned by the Devils to the AHL to play with affiliate the Utica Comets. Beckman registered 20 assists and 33 points through 43 appearances before he was traded by the Devils to the New York Islanders, in exchange for Dennis Cholowski on March 7, 2025. After playing out the season in the AHL, Beckman was re-signed by the Islanders to a one-year, two-way contract extension on July 9, 2025.

Beckman played exclusively with the Bridgeport Islanders in the AHL while under contract with New York, recording 51 points in 68 appearances in the 2025–26 season. He led Bridgeport with a professional-high 30 goals and picked up 1 point in 2 Calder Cup playoff games.

As a free agent from the Islanders, Beckman was signed to a two-year, two-way contract with the Colorado Avalanche on July 1, 2026. He made his Avalanche debut on November 19 against the Anaheim Ducks following an injury to Gavin Brindley.

== International play ==
In the summer of 2020, Beckman was invited to participate in Team Canada's National Junior Team Summer Development Camp.

== Career statistics ==
			Regular season					Playoffs
Season	Team	League	GP	G	A	Pts	PIM	GP	G	A	Pts	PIM
2017–18	Nipawin Hawks	SJHL	1	1	1	2	0	3	2	0	2	0
2017–18	Spokane Chiefs	WHL	1	0	0	0	0	—	—	—	—	—
2018–19	Spokane Chiefs	WHL	68	32	30	62	16	15	8	4	12	2
2019–20	Spokane Chiefs	WHL	63	48	59	107	18	—	—	—	—	—
2020–21	Iowa Wild	AHL	9	3	2	5	0	—	—	—	—	—
2020–21	Spokane Chiefs	WHL	21	17	10	27	8	—	—	—	—	—
2021–22	Iowa Wild	AHL	68	11	23	34	28	—	—	—	—	—
2021–22	Minnesota Wild	NHL	3	0	1	1	2	—	—	—	—	—
2022–23	Iowa Wild	AHL	53	24	12	36	18	2	1	0	1	0
2022–23	Minnesota Wild	NHL	9	0	0	0	0	—	—	—	—	—
2023–24	Iowa Wild	AHL	51	19	14	33	24	—	—	—	—	—
2023–24	Minnesota Wild	NHL	11	0	2	2	12	—	—	—	—	—
2024–25	Utica Comets	AHL	43	13	20	33	26	—	—	—	—	—
2024–25	Bridgeport Islanders	AHL	12	4	3	7	0	—	—	—	—	—
2025–26	Bridgeport Islanders	AHL	68	30	21	51	36	2	0	1	1	0
NHL totals			23	0	3	3	14	—	—	—	—	—

== Awards and honours ==
Award	Year	Ref
SMAAAHL
First All-Star Team	2018	
Top Forward	2018	
WHL
West First All-Star Team	2020	
Bob Clarke Trophy	2020	
Four Broncos Memorial Trophy	2020	
