= Lloyd Saunders Memorial Trophy =

- Awarded for: Top executive in the WHL
- 2019–20 Winner: Peter Anholt (Lethbridge Hurricanes)

The Lloyd Saunders Memorial Trophy is awarded annually to the top executive in the Western Hockey League. It is named in honour of former broadcaster Lloyd Saunders.

== Winners ==
Season	Player	Team
1987–88	Jim Loria	Spokane Chiefs
1988–89	Dennis Beyak	Saskatoon Blades
1989–90	Russ Farwell	Seattle Thunderbirds
1990–91	Bob Brown	Kamloops Blazers
1991–92	Daryl Lubiniecki	Saskatoon Blades
1992–93	Bruce Hamilton	Tacoma Rockets
1993–94	Bob Brown	Kamloops Blazers
1994–95	Kelly McCrimmon	Brandon Wheat Kings
1995–96	Tim Speltz	Spokane Chiefs
1996–97	Todd McLellan	Swift Current Broncos
1997–98	Ken Hodge	Portland Winter Hawks
1998–99	Don Hay	Tri-City Americans
1999–2000	Tim Speltz	Spokane Chiefs
2000–01	Brent Sutter	Red Deer Rebels
2001–02	Brad McEwen	Swift Current Broncos
2002–03	Bruce Hamilton	Kelowna Rockets
2003–04	Kelly Kisio	Calgary Hitmen
2004–05	Jeff Chynoweth	Kootenay Ice
2005–06	Scott Bonner	Vancouver Giants
2006–07	Bob Tory	Tri-City Americans
2007–08	Bob Tory	Tri-City Americans
2008–09	Kelly Kisio	Calgary Hitmen
2009–10	Kelly McCrimmon	Brandon Wheat Kings
2010–11	Lorne Molleken	Saskatoon Blades
2011–12	Bob Green	Edmonton Oil Kings
2012–13	Bob Green	Edmonton Oil Kings
2013–14	Cam Hope	Victoria Royals
2014–15	Kelly McCrimmon	Brandon Wheat Kings
2015–16	Peter Anholt	Lethbridge Hurricanes
2016–17	John Paddock	Regina Pats
2017–18	Garry Davidson	Everett Silvertips
2018–19	Curtis Hunt	Prince Albert Raiders
2019–20	Peter Anholt	Lethbridge Hurricanes
2020–21	not awarded	
2021–22	Matt Cockell	Winnipeg Ice
2022–23	Bil La Forge	Seattle Thunderbirds
2023–24	Mark Lamb	Prince George Cougars
2024–25	Matt Bardsley	Spokane Chiefs
2025–26	Fred Harbinson	Penticton Vees

== See also ==
- OHL Executive of the Year
- John Horman Trophy - Quebec Major Junior Hockey League Executive of the Year
