= Dave Peterson (ice hockey) =

American ice hockey coach (1931–1997)

- Born: January 5, 1931; Superior, Wisconsin, US
- Died: July 17, 1997 (aged 66); Colorado Springs, Colorado, US
- Resting place: Lakewood Cemetery
- Education: Hamline University
- Occupation: High school teacher
- Years active: 1953–1984
- Known for: United States men's national ice hockey team coach; USA Hockey technical director
- Honors: Dave Peterson Goalie of the Year Award

David Richard Peterson (January 5, 1931 – July 17, 1997) was an American ice hockey coach. He grew up in Saint Paul, Minnesota, graduated from Hamline University, and played semi-professional hockey as a goaltender for the Minneapolis Millers. He served as head coach of ice hockey at Southwest High School from 1955 to 1982, where he also taught business. His teams qualified for 14 Minnesota State High School League tournaments, which included an undefeated 1969–70 season to win the state championship.

Peterson was the director of coaching and player development for USA Hockey, wrote its coaching manual for goaltenders, served as the goaltender coach on the United States men's team at the 1984 Winter Olympics, and was head coach of the team at Ice Hockey World Championships in 1985, 1986, and 1987. As head coach of the United States men's team at the 1988 and 1992 Winter Olympics, his teams finished in seventh and fourth place respectively. He also served as head coach of the United States men's junior team which won its first World Junior Championship medal with a bronze in 1986. He verbally sparred with media at the 1988 Winter Olympics, and was criticized for his coaching strategy, player selection, and gruff disposition.

The American Hockey Coaches Association recognized him with the John "Snooks" Kelley Founders Award in 1993. He was inducted into the Minnesota State High School Coaches Association Hall of Fame, and the Minneapolis Hockey Hall of Fame. USA Hockey annually gives the Dave Peterson Goalie of the Year Award to a junior ice hockey goaltender. Minnesota Hockey operates an annual Dave Peterson CCM High Performance Goalie Camp for high school students, and gives the Dave Peterson Award to a high school coach for leadership in developing hockey.

== Early life and playing career ==
David Richard Peterson was born on January 5, 1931, in Superior, Wisconsin, to parents Hiram and Marie Peterson. (Note: Full name: David Richard Peterson; Birthdate calculated as January 5, 1931: Peterson was reported to have his 57th birthday on January 5, 1988.; Born in Superior, Wisconsin, to parents Hiram and Marie Peterson) Peterson was the son of a barber, his family had German, Irish, and Norwegian heritage, and moved to Saint Paul, Minnesota, when he was two years old. As a youth, he played ice hockey outdoors at a local park, and also played baseball and American football.

First playing as a goaltender as a freshman at Harding Senior High School in Saint Paul, Peterson then participated in the Minnesota state hockey championships during his senior year. His high school hockey team won the Region IV championship in 1948, then won the consolation championship at the Minnesota State High School League tournament, with Peterson winning two games as their goaltender.

Peterson attended Hamline University to play football, and earned a teacher's degree. He was a top-scoring placekicker in the Minnesota Intercollegiate Athletic Conference, and also played offensive and defensive guard. He also played hockey at Hamline, and semi-professional hockey for US$10 per game.

Coach John Mariucci signed Peterson to play for the Minneapolis Millers in the American Amateur Hockey League, during the 1951–52 season. Peterson returned to the Millers for the 1952–53 season, now in the Central Hockey League, and later played for the Minneapolis Bungalows in the Minnesota Hockey League during the 1954–55 season.

== Minnesota high school coaching ==
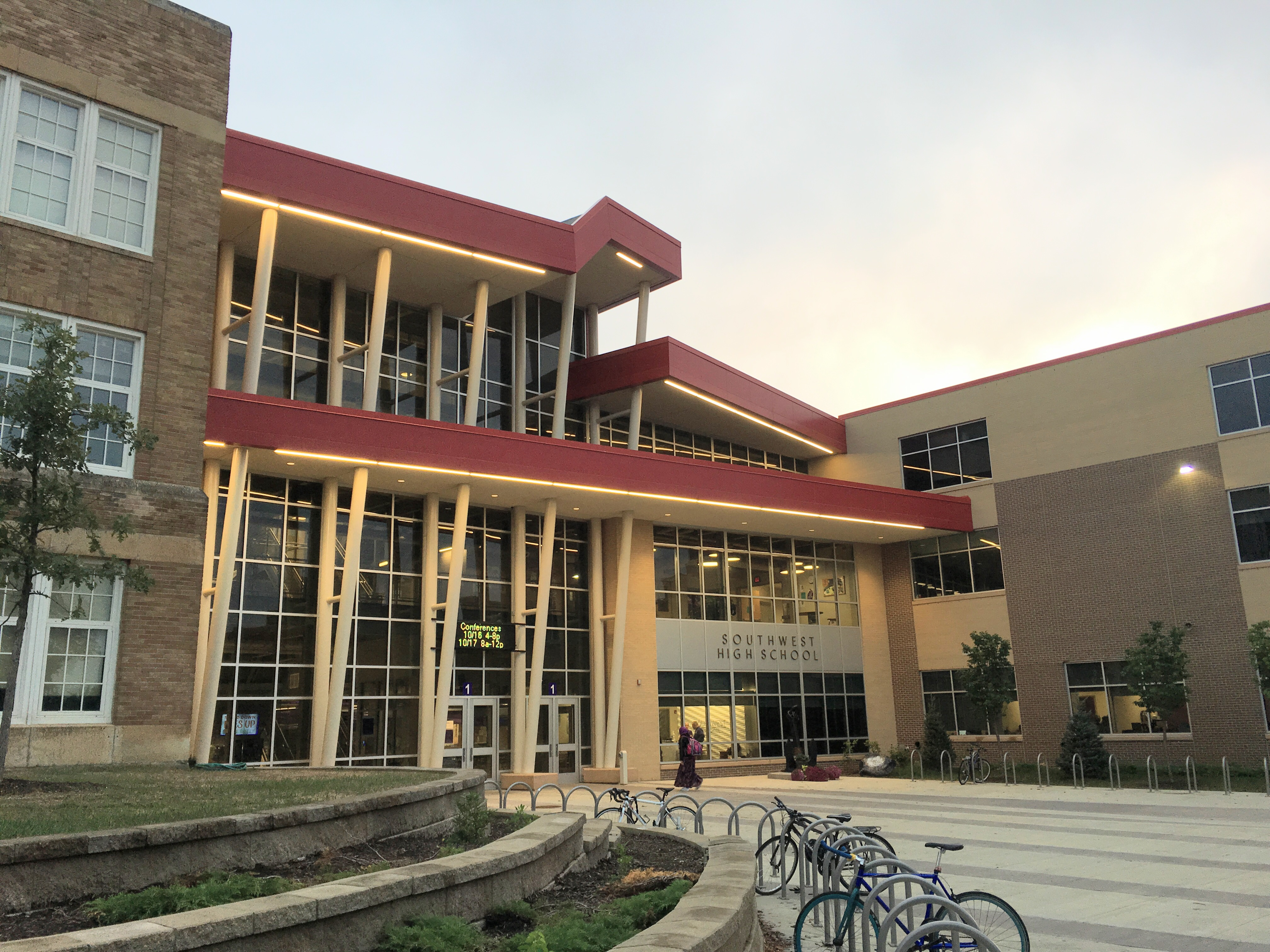
Southwest High School

In 1953, Peterson began teaching business and coaching basketball at Braham, Minnesota, then moved to Minneapolis North High School in 1954. After one season of coaching hockey at Minneapolis North, he became head coach of hockey and assistant coach of football at Southwest High School in 1955. He also served as the school's first soccer coach, and taught business classes including typing, shorthand, and bookkeeping. He coached hockey at Southwest High School from 1955 to 1982, and retired as a teacher in 1984.

Peterson maximized practice time for the senior hockey team by maintaining an outdoor rink at Pershing Park with assistance from the players, rather than travelling longer distances to an indoor rink. He also made goaltender masks for high school players. Peterson's teams at Southwest High School qualified for 14 Minnesota State High School League tournaments, including one state championship, one second-place finish, two third-place results, and one consolation championship. His 1969–70 team had an undefeated season, and won the state championship versus Edina High School.

== United States national coaching ==
Peterson began working for the Amateur Hockey Association of the United States (AHAUS) in the mid-1970s, writing a manual on coaching goaltenders. He served as an assistant coach to Lou Vairo on the United States men's junior team at the 1983 World Junior Championships. Peterson later served as the goaltending coach for Vairo on the United States men's team which placed seventh in ice hockey at the 1984 Winter Olympics.

As head coach of the United States men's team at Ice Hockey World Championships, Peterson led them in 1985, 1986, and 1987. He also served as head coach of the United States men's junior team which won its first IIHF World Junior Championship medal with a bronze in 1986, and a fourth-place finish in 1987. He later served as head coach for the US men's national team at the 1987 Pravda Cup.

=== 1988 Winter Olympics ===
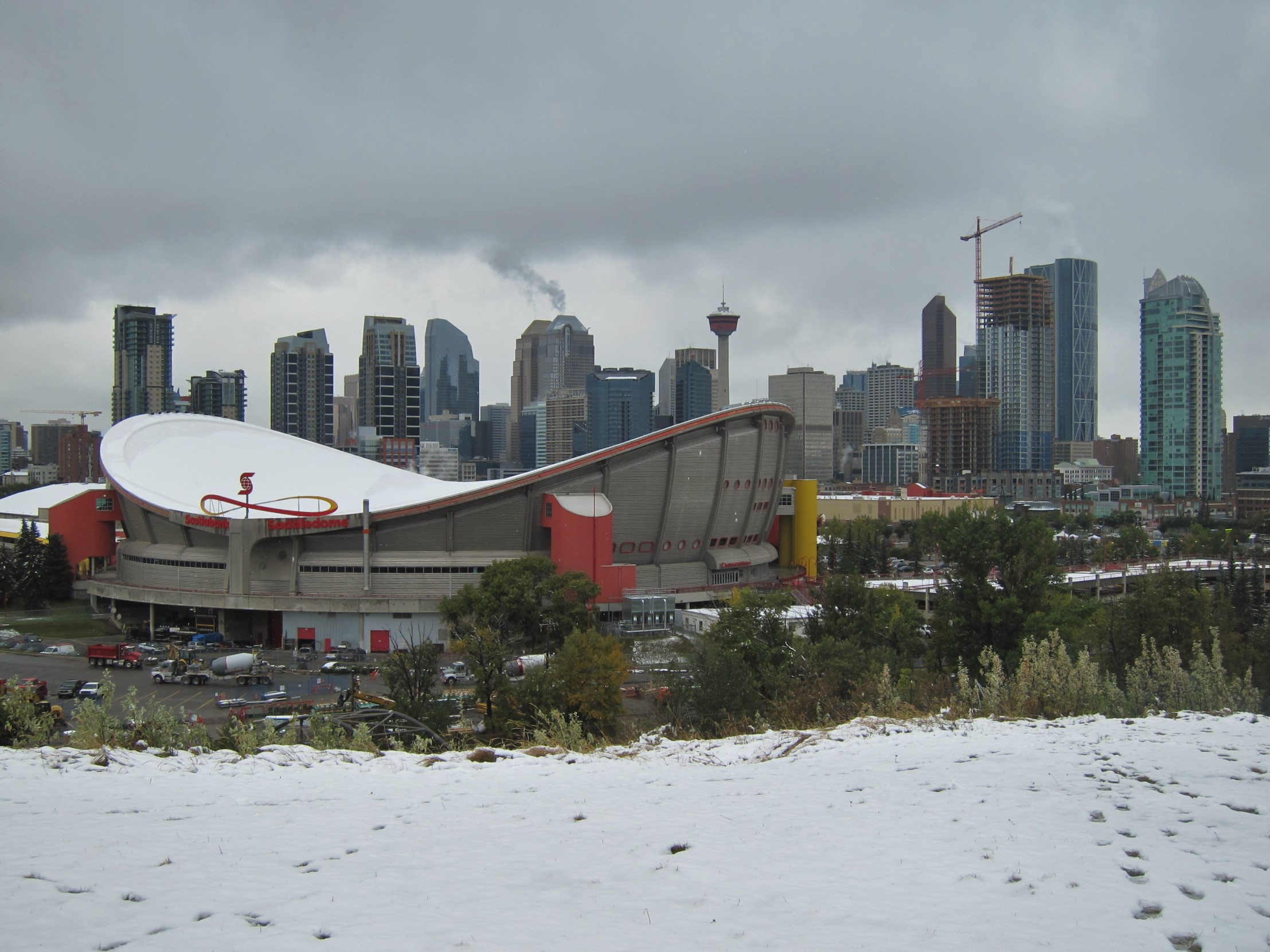
The Calgary Saddledome hosted ice hockey games at the 1988 Winter Olympics.

The AHAUS chose Peterson as head coach of the United States men's team for ice hockey at the 1988 Winter Olympics, when it desired a coach who was committed to the players and teaching, instead of furthering his own career. National team general manager Art Berglund stated, "it doesn't matter whether it's high school, college or the pros, [Peterson] knows how to handle young men", and that "he's been part of our developmental program for years". Chicago Tribune journalist Bob Verdi felt that Peterson was expected to be a father figure to the players, who played a schedule of exhibition games with the national team during the 1987–88 season. Peterson opted against last-minute additions of National Hockey League (NHL) players to the Olympic roster, as not to be unfair to the players who played the season.

Peterson was criticized by media at the 1988 Winter Olympics for his coaching strategy, player selection, and gruff disposition. He defended his team's offensive-style system despite losses early in the Olympic tournament. He had a verbal exchange with Klauss Zaugg, a German-language reporter from Switzerland, who questioned the offensive style and lack of defense. After losing to the West Germany national team and being eliminated from medal contention, Zaugg stated, "What is your system, Coach? You have no system". Peterson called the international media "dishonest, lazy and uninformed", and also stated "I have a tough time believing some of you have ever seen a hockey game".

Patrick Reusse wrote in the Star Tribune, that Peterson deliberately took the role of a villain, to alleviate the pressure on the players. Sports Illustrated wrote that United States men's team "massively underachieved" with a seventh-place finish, and noted that twelve of the players were in the NHL within four years of the Olympics. Sports Illustrated also wrote that the exhibition season prior to the Olympics included games against college teams, which were easily defeated while falling into "bad defensive habits".

After the 1988 Winter Olympics, Peterson worked as the director of coaching and player development for AHAUS. He conducted coaching clinics across the nation, and wanted to change the perception that a player had to go to a college-preparatory school in the Eastern United States for better coaching. He also advocated more quality coaching time for youths, and to have two practices per game played.

=== 1992 Winter Olympics ===
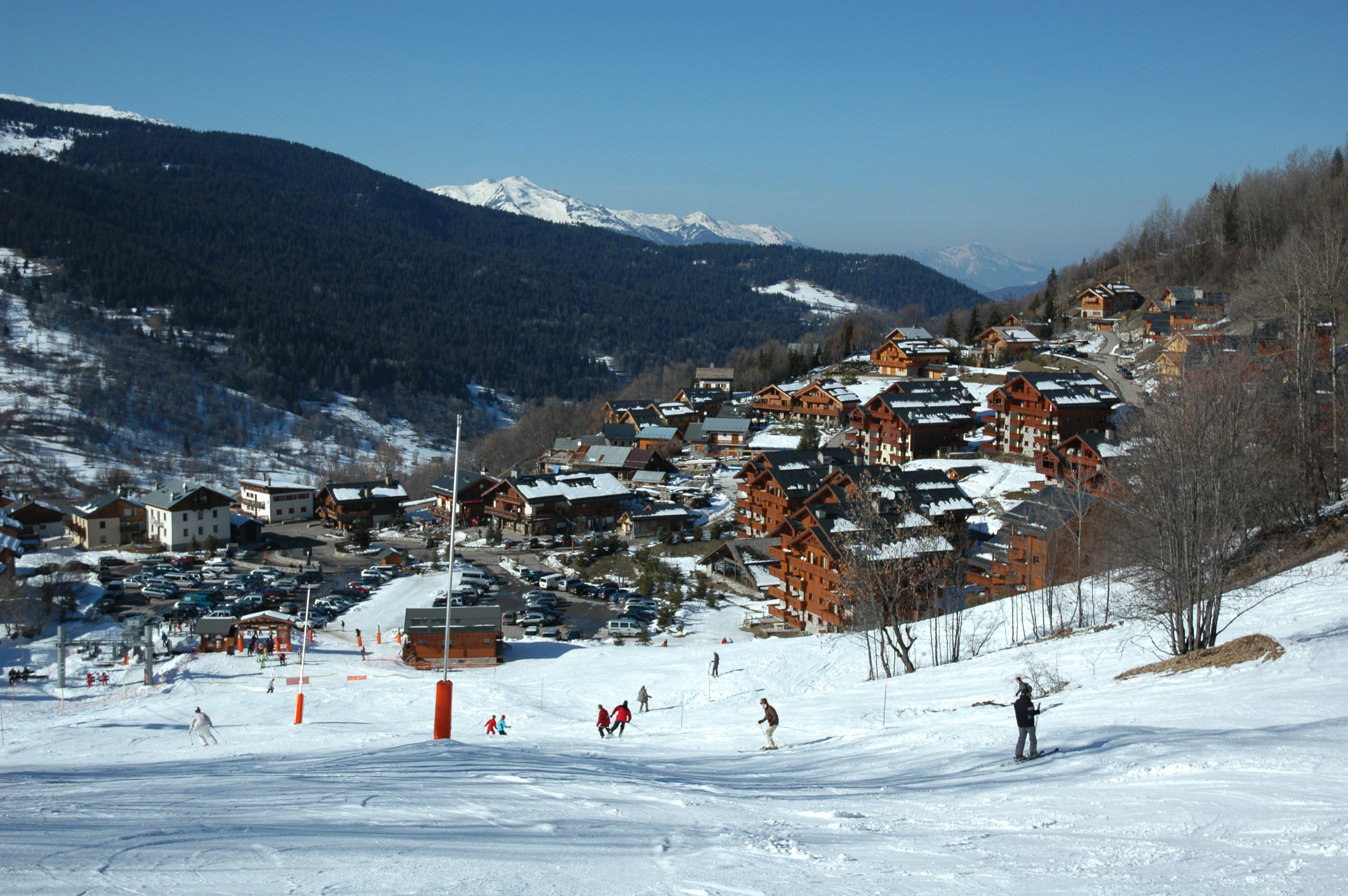
The French ski resort Méribel hosted ice hockey games at the 1992 Winter Olympics.

USA Hockey chose Peterson as head coach for the United States men's team in ice hockey at the 1992 Winter Olympics. Despite the previous criticism, Art Berglund felt that Peterson deserved a second chance, and stated that "most of the criticism was unfair". Selection committee chairman Bob Fleming, stated that Peterson was chosen because he had more continuous international experience. The choice of Peterson as coach was criticized by Sports Illustrated, which wrote that teaching was Peterson's primary weakness, and reported that national team players compared the instruction they received from Peterson and his staff compared to coaching in college, instead of preparing them for a high-level games.

The exhibition schedule for the 1991–92 season included 60 games, more practice time, and higher-caliber opponents. Peterson coached the national team in 21 games versus NHL teams, 14 versus the Canada national team, and eight versus the Russia national team. USA Hockey also had Peterson coached on public relations and dealing with the media. Patrick Reusse wrote in the Star Tribune, that Peterson later proved he could coach by leading a lesser-talented team to a fourth-place finish at the 1992 Winter Olympics. After the Olympics, Peterson worked as the director of coaching and player development for USA Hockey from 1992 to 1997.

== Personal life ==
Peterson married Janice Amsden, a fellow Hamline physical education student, with whom he had four daughters. He was a recreational golfer, and umpired baseball games in Minnesota with fellow hockey coach Bob Johnson.

Peterson had a heart attack on June 22, 1997, at his home in Colorado Springs, Colorado. He subsequently had an angioplasty and recovered at home awaiting coronary artery bypass surgery. He died on July 17, 1997, following complications from the surgery at Penrose Hospital in Colorado Springs. His remains were cremated and interred in Lakewood Cemetery in Minneapolis.

== Honors and legacy ==
Peterson received the John "Snooks" Kelley Founders Award from the American Hockey Coaches Association in 1993, in recognition of his contributions to coaching with the AHAUS and USA Hockey. He was inducted into the Minnesota State High School Coaches Association Hall of Fame in 1996.

After Peterson's death, USA Hockey president Walter Bush said, "The sport of hockey has lost a true leader, a man who touched the lives of countless players, fellow coaches and friends during a remarkable career". Since 2001, USA Hockey annually gives the Dave Peterson Goalie of the Year Award to an outstanding junior ice hockey goaltender.

Peterson was posthumously inducted into the Minneapolis Hockey Hall of Fame in 2016. Minnesota Hockey operates an annual Dave Peterson CCM High Performance Goalie Camp for high school students, and gives the Dave Peterson Award to a high school coach for leadership in developing hockey.
