= Braden Schneider =

Canadian ice hockey player (born 2001)

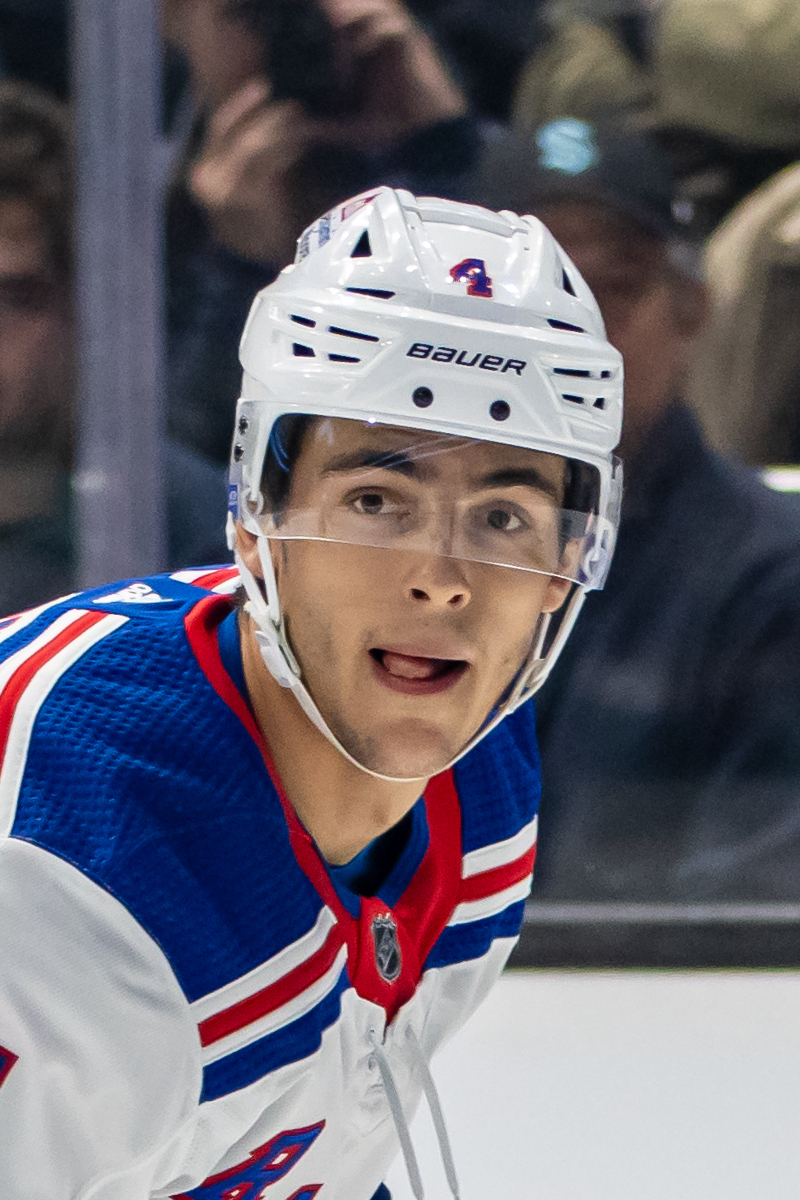
- Schneider (2023)
- Born: September 20, 2001 (age 24) Prince Albert, Saskatchewan, Canada
- Height: 6 ft 3 in (191 cm)
- Weight: 206 lb (93 kg; 14 st 10 lb)
- Position: Defence
- Shoots: Right
- NHL team: New York Rangers
- National team: Canada
- NHL draft: 19th overall, 2020; New York Rangers
- Playing career: 2021–present

Braden Schneider (born September 20, 2001) is a Canadian professional ice hockey player who is a defenceman for the New York Rangers of the National Hockey League (NHL). He was drafted 19th overall by the Rangers in the 2020 NHL entry draft.

== Playing career ==
Schneider finished his 2019–20 season for the Brandon Wheat Kings with 35 assists and 42 points. Schneider was drafted 19th overall by the New York Rangers in the 2020 NHL entry draft. Because of the COVID-19 pandemic causing the Western Hockey League (WHL) to be on hold, Schneider began play in 2021 with the Rangers' American Hockey League (AHL) partner, the Hartford Wolf Pack, on an amateur tryout that would allow him to return to the Wheat Kings. He made his professional debut with the Wolf Pack, totaling two appearances for one assist before he was returned to junior on February 13, 2021. On March 4, Schneider was signed to a three-year, entry-level contract by the Rangers.

Schneider made his NHL debut against the San Jose Sharks on January 13, 2022. He scored his first NHL goal in the same game.

He began the 2024-25 NHL season playing as a left defenseman rather than on his natural right side due to an injury to Rangers' left defenseman Ryan Lindgren.

== International play ==
Medal record

Representing Canada

Ice hockey

World Championships
Gold medal – first place	2021 Latvia	

World Junior Championships
Silver medal – second place	2021 Canada	

He played for Canada under-18 team at the 2019 IIHF World U18 Championships and won a gold medal at the 2018 Hlinka Gretzky Cup.

Schneider played for Canada junior team at the 2021 World Junior Ice Hockey Championships. He was suspended one game during the tournament for his hit on German player Jan-Luca Schumacher in Canada's 16–2 win. In the tournament Schneider posted three points in six games for Canada and the team won silver medals.

That same year Schneider played for Canada men's national ice hockey team at the 2021 Men's Ice Hockey World Championships in which he scored an assist en route to a gold medal.

== Career statistics ==
=== Regular season and playoffs ===
			Regular season					Playoffs
Season	Team	League	GP	G	A	Pts	PIM	GP	G	A	Pts	PIM
2016–17	Brandon Wheat Kings	WHL	1	0	0	0	0	3	0	1	1	0
2017–18	Brandon Wheat Kings	WHL	66	1	21	22	16	11	0	6	6	4
2018–19	Brandon Wheat Kings	WHL	58	8	16	24	26	—	—	—	—	—
2019–20	Brandon Wheat Kings	WHL	60	7	35	42	42	—	—	—	—	—
2020–21	Hartford Wolf Pack	AHL	2	0	1	1	0	—	—	—	—	—
2020–21	Brandon Wheat Kings	WHL	22	5	22	27	12	—	—	—	—	—
2021–22	Hartford Wolf Pack	AHL	24	0	9	9	10	—	—	—	—	—
2021–22	New York Rangers	NHL	43	2	9	11	9	20	0	3	3	6
2022–23	New York Rangers	NHL	81	5	13	18	16	7	1	0	1	9
2023–24	New York Rangers	NHL	82	5	14	19	16	16	0	2	2	16
2024–25	New York Rangers	NHL	80	6	15	21	18	—	—	—	—	—
2025–26	New York Rangers	NHL	82	2	16	18	26	—	—	—	—	—
NHL totals			368	20	67	87	85	43	1	5	6	31

=== International ===
Year	Team	Event	GP	G	A	Pts	PIM
2019	Canada	U18	7	2	1	3	2
2021	Canada	WJC	6	1	2	3	25
2021	Canada	WC	9	0	1	1	0
Junior totals			13	3	3	6	27
Senior totals			9	0	1	1	0

Awards and achievements
Preceded by Alexis Lafrenière	New York Rangers first-round draft pick 2020	Succeeded by Brennan Othmann
