= David Andrews Awards of Excellence =

US ice hockey awards

The David Andrews Awards of Excellence, formerly the President's Awards, are two annual awards given out by the American Hockey League (AHL). The first award is presented to an AHL organization and recognizes "excellence in all areas off the ice." The second is given to a player as recognition of outstanding accomplishments in that year. The awards were first handed out following the 2008–09 season. The name was changed for the 2025–26 season in honor of former AHL president Dave Andrews.

The first recipients were the Manitoba Moose and Alexandre Giroux. Since its inception no winning players have been a part of the winning organization.

== Winners ==
Season	Organization Awarded	Player Awarded	Player's team
2008–09	Manitoba Moose	Alexandre Giroux	Hershey Bears
2009–10	Chicago Wolves	P. K. Subban	Hamilton Bulldogs
2010–11	San Antonio Rampage	Bryan Helmer	Oklahoma City Barons
2011–12	Providence Bruins	Cory Conacher	Norfolk Admirals
2012–13	Toronto Marlies	Tyler Johnson	Syracuse Crunch
2013–14	St. John's IceCaps	Travis Morin	Texas Stars
2014–15	Utica Comets	Brian O'Neill	Manchester Monarchs
2015–16	Lake Erie Monsters	Michael Leighton	Rockford IceHogs
2016–17	San Diego Gulls		
2017–18	Toronto Marlies	Mike McKenna	Texas Stars
2018–19	Iowa Wild	Andrew Poturalski	Charlotte Checkers
2019–20	Charlotte Checkers		
2020–21			
2021–22	Springfield Thunderbirds	Stefan Noesen	Chicago Wolves
2022–23	Coachella Valley Firebirds	Dustin Wolf	Calgary Wranglers
2023–24	Hershey Bears	Mavrik Bourque	Texas Stars
2024–25	Laval Rocket	Jacob MacDonald	Colorado Eagles
2025–26	Colorado Eagles	Logan Shaw	Toronto Marlies
