= Jake Christiansen (ice hockey) =

Canadian ice hockey player (born 1999)

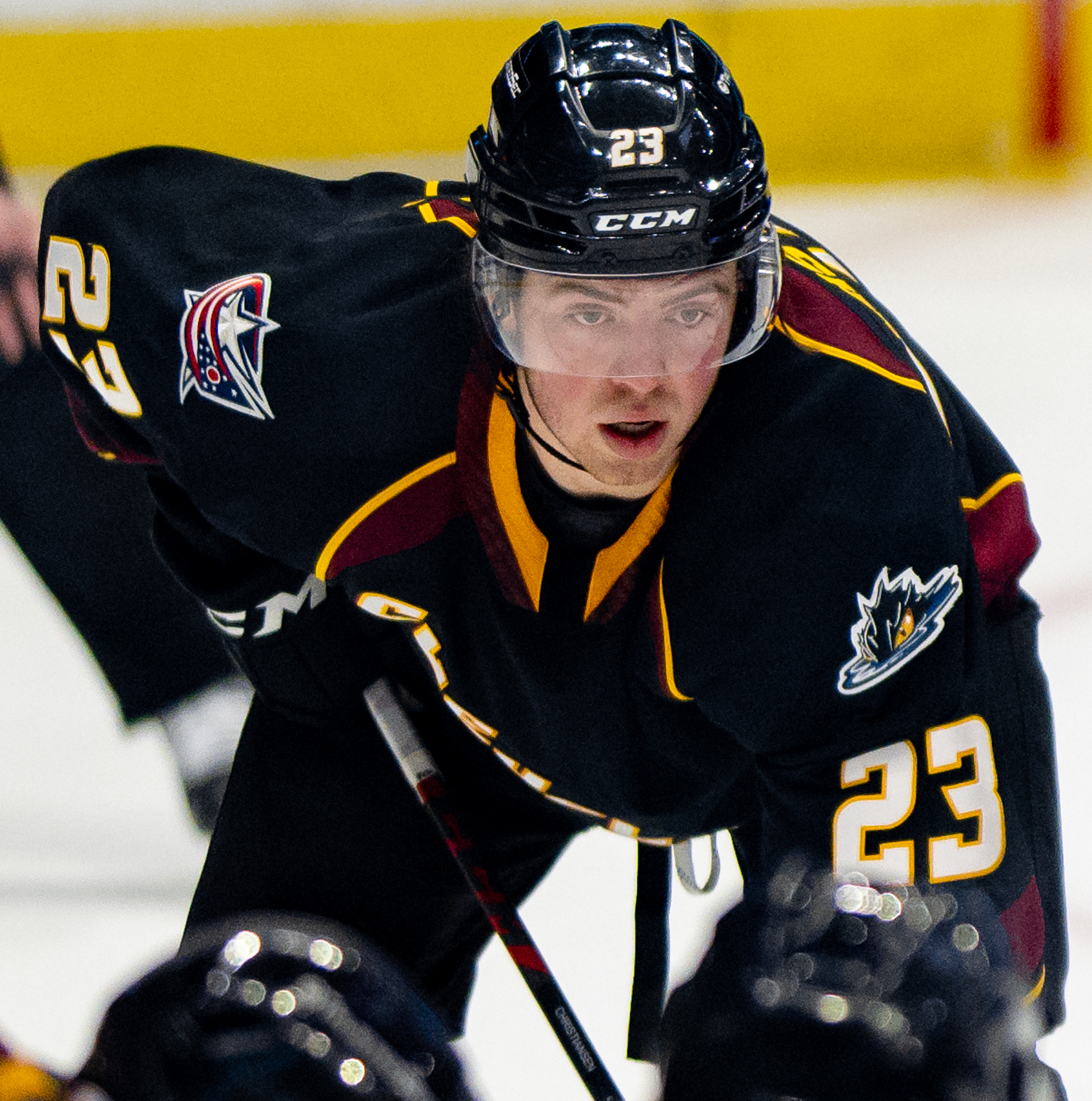
- Christiansen with the Cleveland Monsters in 2023
- Born: September 12, 1999 (age 26) West Vancouver, British Columbia, Canada
- Height: 6 ft 1 in (185 cm)
- Weight: 194 lb (88 kg; 13 st 12 lb)
- Position: Defence
- Shoots: Left
- NHL team: Columbus Blue Jackets
- NHL draft: Undrafted
- Playing career: 2020–present

Jacob Christiansen (born September 12, 1999) is a Canadian professional ice hockey player who is a defenceman for the Columbus Blue Jackets of the National Hockey League (NHL).

== Early life ==
Christiansen was born in West Vancouver. He played major junior hockey in the Western Hockey League (WHL) with the Everett Silvertips. He was originally selected in the fifth-round, 105th overall by the Silvertips in the 2014 WHL Bantam Draft.

== Playing career ==
Following five junior seasons with the Silvertips, Christiansen embarked on his professional career by signing a professional tryout contract with the Stockton Heat of the American Hockey League, the primary affiliate to the Calgary Flames, to begin the 2019–20 season on October 4, 2019. He made his professional debut against the Bakersfield Condors on October 19, 2019, featuring on the Heat's third pairing. He featured in nine games going scoreless before he was released from his tryout and returned to the Everett Silvertips.

In his final overage major junior season, Christiansen notched career bests in registering 22 goals and 28 assists for 50 points in 38 games with the Everett Silvertips, leading the league amongst defensemen in goals and points-per-game. He was signed as an undrafted free agent to a three-year, entry-level contract with the Columbus Blue Jackets on March 4, 2020.

In his first full professional season, Christiansen was reassigned by the Blue Jackets to join AHL affiliate, the Cleveland Monsters, for the shortened pandemic delayed 2020–21 season. He contributed with three goals and 15 points through 28 regular season games.

In the following 2021–22 season, Christiansen continued his tenure with the Monsters before receiving his first recall to Blue Jackets on January 5, 2022. He made his NHL debut with Columbus the following day, playing 12 minutes in a 3–1 defeat to the New Jersey Devils.

== Career statistics ==
| | | | Regular season | | | | | Playoffs |
| Season | Team | League | GP | G | A | Pts | PIM | GP | G | A | Pts | PIM |
|---|---|---|---|---|---|---|---|---|---|---|---|---|
| 2015–16 | Everett Silvertips | WHL | 48 | 4 | 4 | 8 | 10 | 9 | 0 | 0 | 0 | 2 |
| 2016–17 | Everett Silvertips | WHL | 72 | 6 | 13 | 19 | 29 | 10 | 0 | 2 | 2 | 6 |
| 2017–18 | Everett Silvertips | WHL | 72 | 6 | 25 | 31 | 20 | 22 | 2 | 5 | 7 | 2 |
| 2018–19 | Everett Silvertips | WHL | 67 | 12 | 32 | 44 | 20 | 10 | 1 | 7 | 8 | 0 |
| 2019–20 | Stockton Heat | AHL | 9 | 0 | 0 | 0 | 0 | — | — | — | — | — |
| 2019–20 | Everett Silvertips | WHL | 38 | 22 | 28 | 50 | 35 | — | — | — | — | — |
| 2020–21 | Cleveland Monsters | AHL | 28 | 3 | 12 | 15 | 14 | — | — | — | — | — |
| 2021–22 | Cleveland Monsters | AHL | 62 | 13 | 32 | 45 | 33 | — | — | — | — | — |
| 2021–22 | Columbus Blue Jackets | NHL | 8 | 1 | 0 | 1 | 0 | — | — | — | — | — |
| 2022–23 | Cleveland Monsters | AHL | 50 | 11 | 23 | 34 | 53 | — | — | — | — | — |
| 2022–23 | Columbus Blue Jackets | NHL | 24 | 0 | 4 | 4 | 4 | — | — | — | — | — |
| 2023–24 | Cleveland Monsters | AHL | 62 | 13 | 33 | 46 | 34 | 4 | 1 | 0 | 1 | 0 |
| 2023–24 | Columbus Blue Jackets | NHL | 12 | 0 | 2 | 2 | 2 | — | — | — | — | — |
| 2024–25 | Columbus Blue Jackets | NHL | 68 | 1 | 7 | 8 | 11 | — | — | — | — | — |
| 2025–26 | Columbus Blue Jackets | NHL | 40 | 0 | 3 | 3 | 8 | — | — | — | — | — |
| NHL totals | | | 152 | 2 | 16 | 18 | 25 | — | — | — | — | — |

== Awards and honours ==
| Award | Year |
WHL
| West Second All-Star Team | 2020 |
AHL
| Second All-Star Team | 2022 |
