= Dustin Wolf =

American ice hockey player (born 2001)

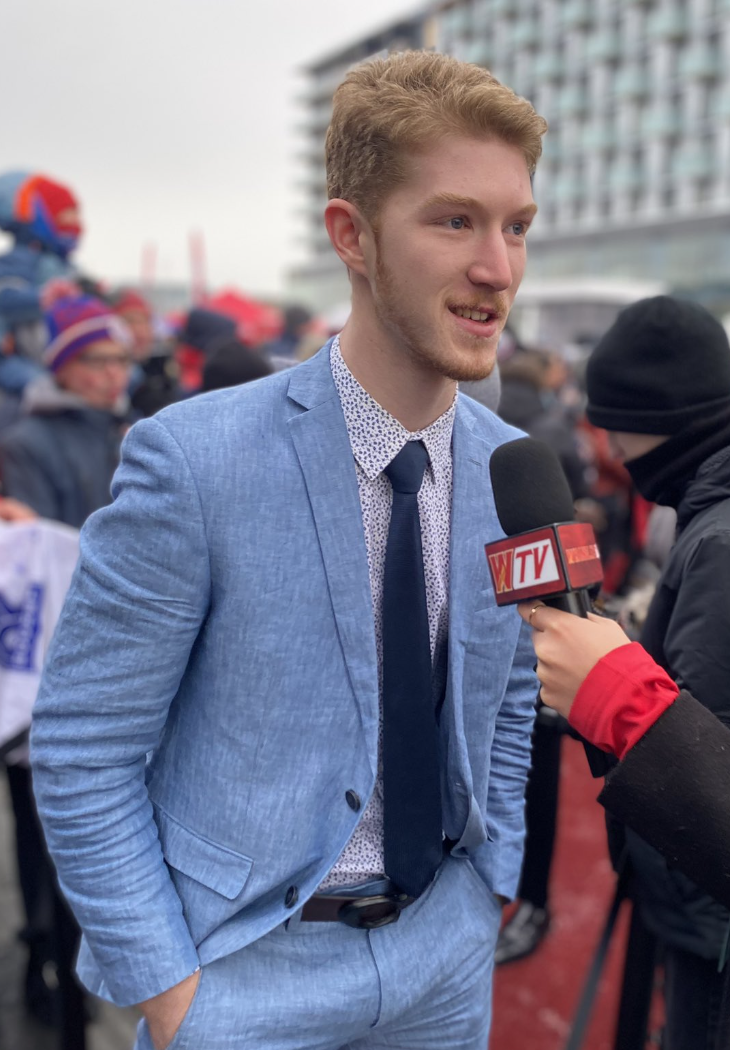
- Wolf in 2023
- Born: April 16, 2001 (age 25) Gilroy, California, U.S.
- Height: 6 ft 0 in (183 cm)
- Weight: 166 lb (75 kg; 11 st 12 lb)
- Position: Goaltender
- Catches: Left
- NHL team: Calgary Flames
- NHL draft: 214th overall, 2019; Calgary Flames
- Playing career: 2021–present

Dustin Wolf (born April 16, 2001) is an American professional ice hockey player who is a goaltender for the Calgary Flames of the National Hockey League (NHL). He was selected in the seventh round of the 2019 NHL entry draft, 214th overall, by the Flames.

Wolf is noted for his small stature. Weighing 166 pounds and standing six feet tall, he is considered significantly undersized for a goaltender. Despite this, Wolf has been highly successful thus far, being named goaltender of the year in his respective leagues for four consecutive seasons from 2020 through 2023. When he became a full-time member of the Flames, he was the runner-up for the Calder Memorial Trophy in 2025 as rookie of the year.

In his major junior career, Wolf played for the Everett Silvertips in the Western Hockey League (WHL), initially as the backup to Carter Hart before claiming the starting position the following season. Wolf would play for four seasons with the Silvertips, posting statistics at or near the top of the league in almost every category, and being named the league's goaltender of the year for two consecutive seasons.

As a professional player, Wolf has spent time with the Calgary Flames AHL affiliate, the Stockton Heat, and remained with the team through their relocation to become the Calgary Wranglers. As of the 2024–25 NHL season, he is playing full-time for the Flames as their starting goaltender. Wolf was named the AHL goaltender of the year in both of his full-time seasons in the league, posted league-leading statistics, and was considered one of the top NHL goaltending prospects during his time in the minors, with The Hockey Writers ranking him as the number one prospect in 2023.

== Early life ==
Wolf was born in Gilroy, California, as the only child to parents Mike and Michelle Wolf. His father Mike worked as a software engineer and his mother Michelle worked as a veterinarian in nearby Morgan Hill, California. Wolf's parents were season-ticket holders for the San Jose Sharks, and he attended their games as an infant. He first began to skate when he was a toddler and began focusing on goaltending around age 5.

In 2011, Wolf's family moved to Hermosa Beach in Southern California after being persuaded by his agent, and he began to play for the Los Angeles Junior Kings. In 2014 Wolf relocated again to nearby Tustin, California.

Wolf spent seven years with the Junior Kings, including competing in the 2014 Quebec International Pee-Wee Hockey Tournament, where he played against future top CHL prospects Samuel Poulin and Xavier Parent. During his WHL bantam draft year, Wolf posted a 2.99 goals against average (GAA) and .905 save percentage (SV%) through seven games with the Junior Kings' bantam AAA team. The following season saw significant improvement, with Wolf posting a 1.63 GAA and .941 SV% while playing for the Junior Kings U16 team.

Former coaches and Los Angeles Kings personnel spoke highly of Wolf's time with the Junior Kings, calling him one of the best goalies in his class, and speaking on his ability to elevate his team respectively.

In my opinion he's one of the top '01 goalies in the country. He's dedicated himself to getting better and it shows – continuously putting a lot of time and energy into working on his skills. We’ve admired his attitude, demeanor, and composure – no matter the situation, he's been dialed in. It's left us with no surprise that he's earned this opportunity.

— Nick Vachon, Junior Kings coach.

Once we started realized how talented this kid was, we all got better...we'd go to Vancouver and we'd upset these superstar teams. Dustin would have a ton of shots, our defense would play great, and the score was always 2-1 or 3-2. Every time.

— Nelson Emerson, Director of Player Personnel, Los Angeles Kings.

== Playing career ==
=== Junior ===
==== 2017–2018: Silvertips backup ====
Selected 104th overall, in the fifth round of the 2016 WHL bantam draft, Wolf began his junior career with the Everett Silvertips of the Western Hockey League (WHL) during the 2017–18 season, serving as the backup goaltender behind the Philadelphia Flyers' then-prospect Carter Hart. Wolf's WHL debut came on October 27, 2017, making 38 stops and recording an assist in a 3–1 win over the Kamloops Blazers. Wolf had a successful initial season, winning 13 of his 20 games with a .928 save percentage, the highest among any rookie with at least 10 games played.

On April 13, 2018, during game five against the Portland Winterhawks in the Conference Semi-finals of the 2018 WHL playoffs, Hart left the game for an undisclosed reason midway through the second period. Coming in for relief, Wolf made his postseason debut, stopping all 4 shots he faced during 9:22 of ice time before Hart's return at the start of the third period in the 4–0, series-clinching win.

==== 2018–2019: Graduation to starter ====
With Hart graduating from the WHL into the Flyers' professional ranks before the 2018–19 WHL season, Wolf became the Silvertips' starter, tripling his number of games from the previous season. Wolf's numbers improved under his increased workload, posting the highest save percentage and goals against average of any goaltender in the Canadian Hockey League with at least 15 games played, with a .936 SV% and 1.69 GAA respectively, amassing a 41–15–2 record in the process. Wolf would make his first postseason start on March 22, 2019, during the 2019 WHL playoffs in the Silvertips first round matchup against the Tri-City Americans, stopping 21 of 22 shots and recording his first playoff win. On March 28, 2019, Wolf would record his first WHL playoff shutout, saving all 24 shots faced in game 4 of their first round matchup. Wolf would start every game for the Silvertips in the 2019 playoffs, earning a 5–4–1 record, a 2.02 GAA, and a .914 SV%, with the Silvertips losing their second round matchup against the Spokane Chiefs.

After being named the WHL Western Conference Goaltender of the Year, Wolf would narrowly lose both the Del Wilson Trophy for the top goaltender in the WHL, and the CHL Goaltender of the Year award to Ian Scott of the Prince Albert Raiders. Wolf lead Scott in every category except one: shutouts, with Wolf's seven falling one short of Scott. After the season, Wolf was awarded the Daryl K. (Doc) Seaman Trophy as the WHL's scholastic player of the year, as well as being named the CHL Scholastic Player of the Year, for his on-ice performance in combination with maintaining a 100% average in his grade 12 classes. Wolf would also be named to the first All-Star team for the WHL's Western Conference.

==== 2019–2021: NHL draft and pandemic seasons ====
Ranked 12th by the league's Central Scouting Bureau among North American goaltenders eligible for the 2019 NHL entry draft, Wolf became the 22nd and final goaltender taken when the Calgary Flames selected him in the seventh round, 214th overall. Before the draft, most analysts expected Wolf to be drafted in the middle of the draft, potentially even as high as the second round. Wolf's slide to the final round of the draft was seen as due to his significantly smaller than average stature for modern NHL goaltenders.

Following the draft, Wolf returned to the Everett Silvertips for the 2019–20 season. Wolf posted stellar numbers for Everett in the pandemic-shortened season, winning 34 out of his 46 games and leading the league in every significant goaltending statistic. After recording nine wins and only a single loss during February, Wolf would be named the WHL's goaltender of the month. Wolf's nine shutouts during the season led by a wide margin, with second place only recording five. At the conclusion of the season, which was shortened and had its playoffs cancelled due to the COVID-19 pandemic, Wolf was awarded both the Del Wilson Trophy as the WHL's top goaltender, and CHL Goaltender of the Year award, becoming the second Silvertips goaltender in three years to earn the award. Additionally, Wolf was once again named to the First All-Star Team for the WHL's Western Conference, and on June 3, 2020, he was named as the recipient of the Dave Peterson Award as the top junior level goaltender in the United States.

The Flames signed Wolf to a three-year entry-level contract on May 1, 2020. On August 31, 2020, 5% of Flames fans surveyed by the Calgary Herald believed Wolf should be the team's starting goaltender for the upcoming season, and on October 15, 2020, The Athletic named Wolf the fifth-best goaltending prospect affiliated with an NHL team.

After a brief stint with the Calgary Flames top affiliate, the Stockton Heat of the American Hockey League (AHL) during a pause in junior hockey due to the COVID-19 pandemic, Wolf returned to the Silvertips to open their 2020–21 season when the WHL's U.S. Division resumed play in March. Wolf once again had a remarkable season for Everett, winning a league-high 18 games and posting a WHL career high .940 SV% during the significantly shortened season. Wolf registered another four shutouts during the season, including three in a row, bringing his WHL career total to 24, the second-highest total of all time behind Carter Hart and Tyson Sexsmith, who are tied at 26. Both Hart and Sexsmith played in significantly more games than Wolf over their WHL careers, with 41 and 30 more games respectively. During Wolf's three-game shutout streak, he set a Silvertips team record, not allowing a goal for 216:27.

After the season, Wolf was awarded the Del Wilson trophy for a second consecutive year. Due to the pandemic-modified schedule, First and Second All-Star Teams were not named for each conference, instead, each division named their own All-Star Team. On May 31, 2021, Wolf, along with three other members of the Silvertips were named to the All-Star Team for the U.S. Division, marking the third year in a row that Wolf was named to one of the league's All-Star Teams.

=== Professional ===
==== 2021–2022: Stockton Heat ====
Wolf began the 2020–21 season with the Stockton Heat, making his professional debut on February 21, 2021, allowing 5 goals on 11 shots before being replaced by Garret Sparks in the eventual 7–1 loss to the Toronto Marlies. Three days later on February 24, 2021, Wolf earned his first professional win, making 36 saves in a 4–2 victory against Toronto. Wolf's time in the AHL that season was cut short when his junior team, the Everett Silvertips resumed play in March.

For the 2021–22 season, Wolf would transition to playing professionally full-time, claiming the starting goaltender spot on the Stockton Heat. Wolf would receive attention for his strong start to the season, not recording a regulation loss until his 18th game of the season. During December, Wolf recorded 7 wins and zero losses, leading to him being named the AHL's goaltender of the month. Wolf had a standout rookie season with the team, leading the league with 33 wins, posting an eighth-best GAA of 2.35, and the fourth-best save percentage with .924.

After the Heat earned a first-round bye based on their regular season performance, Wolf made his professional playoff debut on May 10, 2022, during the Heat's second-round matchup against the Bakersfield Condors in the 2022 Calder Cup playoffs, making 27 saves in the 3–1 win. During their third-round matchup against the Colorado Eagles, Wolf became the third goaltender in AHL history to record three shutouts in a single playoff series. Through his first seven postseason starts, Wolf recorded a brilliant 1.82 GAA and .941 save percentage, and only a single loss. Wolf and the Heat were eliminated in six games during the semi-finals against the Chicago Wolves, the only team with a better regular season record than the Heat.

Following Wolf's dominant freshman season, he was named to both the AHL's All-Rookie team, and the AHL's First All-Star team. On May 5, 2022, Wolf was named as the winner of the Aldege "Baz" Bastien Memorial Award as the league's most outstanding goaltender.

==== 2022–2024: Calgary Wranglers ====
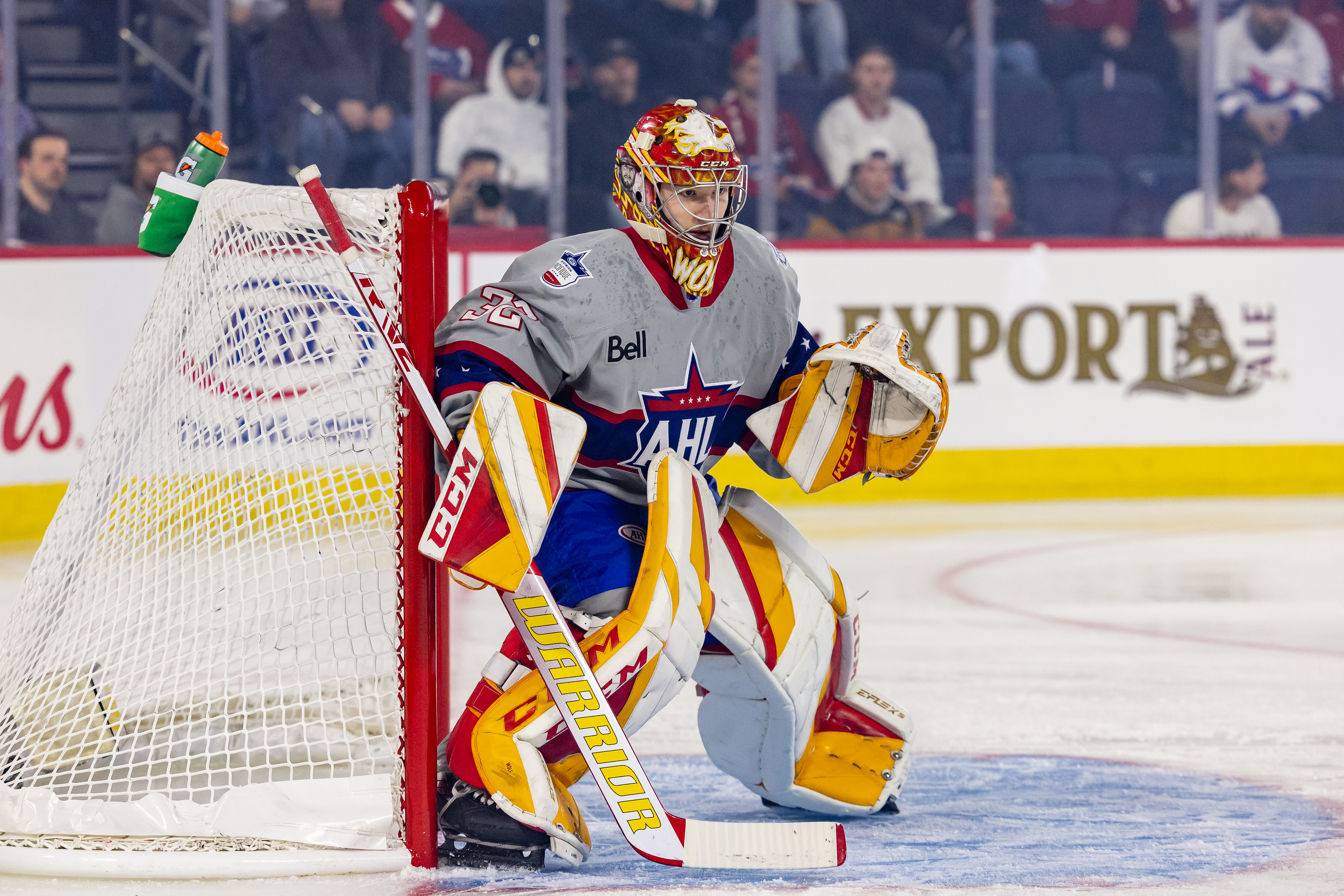
Wolf representing the Pacific Division at the 2023 AHL All-Star Classic

Before the 2022–23 season the Stockton Heat relocated to become the Calgary Wranglers, principally to allow for players to be called up to the Flames on shorter notice. Wolf's sophomore season with the Flames farm club saw him improve over his award-winning rookie season, posting career highs and dominating statistics. Wolf led the league in every major statistical category for goaltenders, and his 42 wins was the most by any goalie in the AHL since the 1960s.

During the 2023 Calder Cup playoffs, Wolf started every game for the Wranglers, recording 5 wins and 4 losses. During the first-round matchup against the Abbotsford Canucks, Wolf recorded a .917 SV% and 2.32 goals against average, significantly worse than his regular-season performance, but enough to propel the Wranglers past the Canucks. During their second-round matchup against the Coachella Valley Firebirds, Wolf would go from cold to hot, being pulled from the net less than halfway through the first game after allowing 5 goals on 21 shots, then recording a shutout in game 4. Game three of the series would not be decided until triple-overtime, with Wolf between the pipes for 1:51:22 in the eventual 3–2 loss. Wolf and the Wranglers would be eliminated from Calder Cup contention during overtime in game 5 on May 20, 2023, with Wolf allowing 6 goals on 41 shots.

Wolf's dominant season would result in him being named the recipient of every possible AHL award for regular-season performance. These awards were: the Les Cunningham Award, awarded as the league's MVP, the President's Award, for outstanding accomplishments in that year, the Harry "Hap" Holmes Memorial Award, for having the lowest goals against average (GAA), and a second consecutive Aldege “Baz” Bastien Memorial Award as the league's top goaltender, the first time a player had ever won the award back to back. Additionally, Wolf was selected to play in the seasons AHL All-Star Classic, where he was named MVP of the tournament alongside Lukas Dostal, and he was once again named to the First All-Star team, along with his teammate Matthew Phillips.

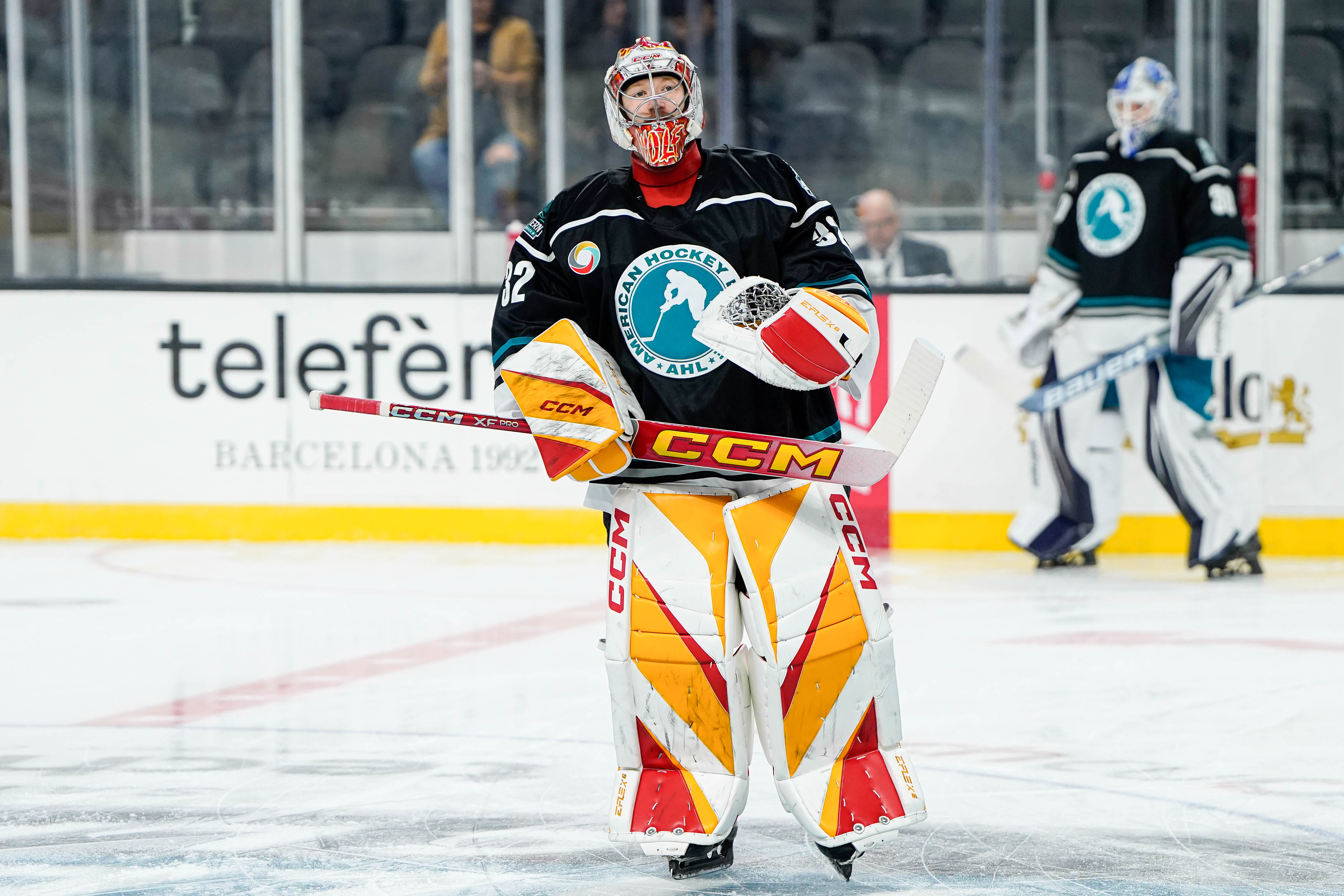
Wolf would again represent the Pacific Division at the 2024 AHL All-Star Classic.

During the 2023–24 season Wolf would split time between the Wranglers and the Flames, playing a handful of games for the major club, but mostly spending time in the AHL. Wolf's dominant performance the prior season would continue at the beginning of the season, resulting in him once again being named to the season's AHL All-Star Classic, this year alongside Matt Coronato, where he would help lead the Pacific division to the championship undefeated.

Wolf would see slight regressions in his AHL performance this season, placing fourth in save percentage and eleventh in GAA among American league starting goaltenders. Wolf explained this, as well as his early struggles in the NHL as a result of his frequent switches between playing with the Flames and Wranglers.

You can never truly get settled into where you're at. There's certainly an adjustment period of a couple of days when you go up. And when you're only up there for a week, and you're on the road, or you're not skating every single day. It can be difficult. And I think that's something that's been a learning curve for me.

— Dustin Wolf

Following the conclusion of the Flames 2023–24 season, Wolf would be reassigned to the Wranglers for the 2024 Calder Cup playoffs. During the first round of the playoffs, Wolf would lead the 7 seed Wranglers to an upset sweep over the 2 seed Tucson Roadrunners, recording a 46 save shutout in game one, and stopping 86 out of 89 total shots in the best-of-three series. During the second round, in a repeat matchup of the previous season's round-three series against the Coachella Valley Firebirds, Wolf and the Wranglers would win game one, before losing three in a row to end their season in the best-of-five series. Game two of the series would end controversially when the Firebirds scored the game-winning overtime goal during a sequence that appeared to be offside, with too many men, and potential goaltender and player interference, though due to league rules, the goal could not be reviewed.

==== 2023–present: Calgary Flames ====
Wolf was recalled by the Calgary Flames on April 12, 2023, where he made his National Hockey League debut alongside rookie Matthew Coronato. He stopped 23 of 24 shots en route to his first career NHL win, with the Flames beating the San Jose Sharks 3–1.

Wolf with the Flames in 2026

In the leadup to the 2023–24 season, there was significant discussion as to whether or not Wolf would have a spot on the opening night roster for the Flames. However, with the Flames already having two goalies in Jacob Markström and Daniel Vladař committed to contracts, they were unable to open a roster spot. When asked about whether or not Wolf would begin the season with the Flames, general manager Craig Conroy stated "If I was looking right now today, I think the two guys that were here in the years past are really dialed in. I mean, they look sharp. So it's tough to say we’re going to change something." Due to this, as well as the fact that he is waivers exempt, Wolf would begin the season once again in the AHL with the Calgary Wranglers. On November 9, 2023, Wolf was recalled by the Flames following Markström being named as day-to-day with an unspecified injury. On November 14, 2023, Wolf was reassigned to the Wranglers following Markstrom returning to the lineup from his injury. During his 5-day stint with the Flames, he played one game against the Ottawa Senators, saving 34 out of 38 shots in a 4–1 loss. On December 5, 2023, Markström was once again injured, suffering a fractured finger. Resultingly, Wolf would be recalled to the Flames for the second time during the season. During his second call-up, Wolf would appear in 4 games, 3 as the starter, and once as a mid-game replacement for Vladař before being returned to the Wranglers on December 17, 2023. Wolf would be recalled a third time, from January 16 to 21 2024, again due to an injury to Markström, but would not play in any games during the time. He would be recalled a fourth time on 12 March 2024, following another lower-body injury to Markström. During Wolf's fourth recall, on March 21, 2024, the Flames announced that Vladař would undergo season-ending hip surgery and that resultingly, Wolf would remain with the Flames for the remainder of the season. After winning his final four starts, Wolf returned to the Wranglers following the conclusion of the Flames' season on April 18, 2024.

On July 30, 2024, the Flames re-signed Wolf to a two-year, $1.7 million contract extension to avoid salary arbitration.

In advance of the 2024–25 season, the Flames would trade Jacob Markström to the New Jersey Devils on June 19, 2024. This trade would open up the starting goaltender position for the Flames, and along with the signing of Devin Cooley, caused significant discussion as to who would start the season in net for the team. After training camp, Devin Cooley would be assigned to the Calgary Wranglers, leaving Daniel Vladař and Wolf. The duo would split duties evenly for the first 11 games, alternating starts, with both goaltenders performing well. In early November, the Flames would stray from their rotation, starting both goaltenders for two games in a row. Later in the same month, Wolf would start three consecutive games, including earning his first NHL shutout with a 2–0 win over the Nashville Predators on November 15, 2024. By the end of the season, Wolf had cemented himself as the starting goaltender for the Flames, starting 53 out 82 games. Wolf's dominant performances early in the season would spark significant discussion around him potentially winning the Calder Memorial Trophy, the NHL's award for best rookie player. Wolf led the Flames to a ninth-place finish in the Western Conference, narrowly missing qualification for the 2025 Stanley Cup playoffs. He was widely credited as the main reason for the team's success that season, finishing with a 29–16–8 record with a .910 save percentage. At the end of the season he was a finalist for the Calder Memorial Trophy, coming in second place behind Lane Hutson, and was named to the league's All-Rookie Team.

On September 9, 2025, after his first full-time season, Wolf signed a seven-year, $52.5 million contract extension with the Flames, which starts in 2026-27.

== International play ==
Medal record

Representing United States

Men's ice hockey

World Junior Championships
| Gold medal – first place | 2021 Canada | |

On July 2, 2018, Wolf was named to the USA Hockey National Team Development Program's U-18 roster for the 2018 Hlinka Gretzky Cup. Wolf would record a shutout in his international debut, stopping all 23 shots in a 6–0 win over the Czech Republic. In the tournament semi-final against Team Canada, Wolf would be scored on after the final buzzer by Dylan Cozens, controversially sending the game to overtime due to an executive decision to not allow video-review at the tournament. Wolf would be scored on again at the 1:44 mark of the overtime period, ending the game with a final score of 6–5. Wolf would not play in the bronze-medal game, where Team USA would fall to Russia in a 5–4 loss, placing fourth in the tournament. Over his 3 games at the tournament, Wolf would be credited with two wins, a .909 save percentage, and a 2.65 goals against average.

On December 23, 2019, USA Hockey announced that Wolf had been named to Team USA for the 2020 World Junior Ice Hockey Championships in the Czech Republic. Wolf played one game in the tournament: a round-robin match against Germany, in which he made 17 saves on 20 shots en route to a 6–3 USA victory. Team USA would finish sixth in the tournament, falling to Finland in the quarterfinals.

In advance of the pandemic-delayed 2020–21 hockey seasons for both the NHL and the WHL, Wolf was again named to the Team USA roster for the 2021 World Junior Ice Hockey Championships. Wolf's first game at the tournament would be as a mid-game replacement for Spencer Knight on December 25, 2020, stopping all 11 shots faced en route to a 5–3 loss against Russia. The next night, on December 26, 2020, Wolf recorded his first career World Junior shutout, making 10 saves during Team USA's 11–0 win over Austria. Through his two appearances at the tournament, Wolf stopped all 21 shots faced and was not credited with a loss, helping lead Team USA towards capturing the gold medal.

== Goaltending style ==
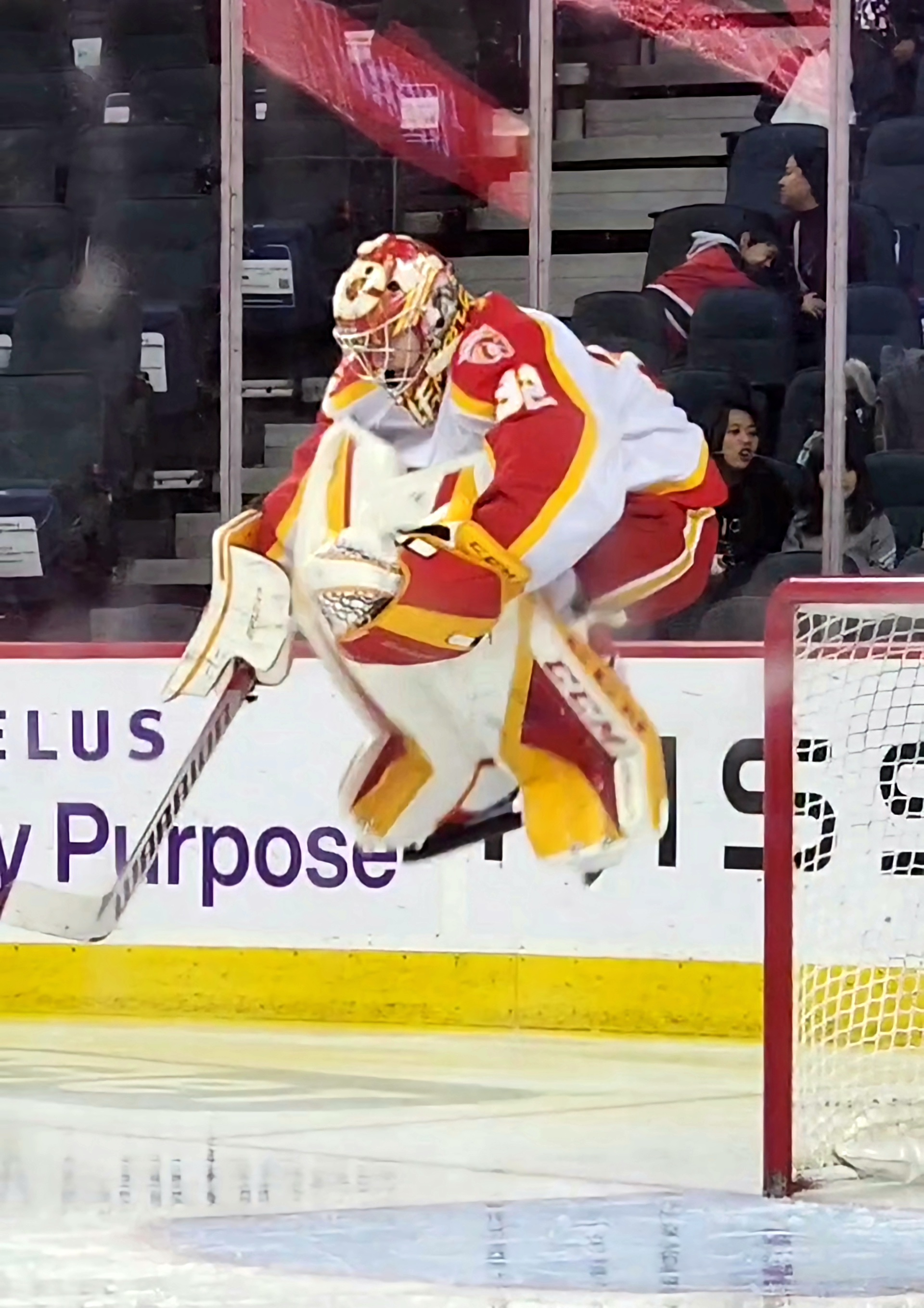
Wolf performing his warmup jump.

Due to his smaller-than-average size, Wolf plays a more upright style than is typical for modern goaltenders. He has received praise for his high skill in lateral movement and positioning, as well as his quick reflexes.

Wolf is noted for his warmup routine at the start of each period, which is concluded by a vertical jump. Wolf has been performing the jump since his time playing for the Everett Silvertips.

Wolf has described reading the pace of a pass as a key trigger in lateral save decisions, noting that a soft, deliberate feed from a point man signals a one-timer threat and informs whether he moves across on his feet rather than initiating a slide.

== Career statistics ==
=== Regular season and playoffs ===
Bold indicate led league

| | | | Regular season | | | | | | | | | Playoffs |
| Season | Team | League | GP | W | L | OTL | MIN | GA | SO | GAA | SV% | GP | W | L | MIN | GA | SO | GAA | SV% |
|---|---|---|---|---|---|---|---|---|---|---|---|---|---|---|---|---|---|---|---|
| 2017–18 | Everett Silvertips | WHL | 20 | 13 | 6 | 0 | 1,147 | 43 | 4 | 2.25 | .928 | 1 | 0 | 0 | 9 | 0 | 0 | 0.00 | 1.000 |
| 2018–19 | Everett Silvertips | WHL | **61** | **41** | 15 | 4 | **3,615** | 102 | 7 | **1.69** | **.936** | 10 | 5 | 5 | 595 | 20 | 1 | 2.02 | .914 |
| 2019–20 | Everett Silvertips | WHL | 46 | **34** | 10 | 2 | 2,713 | 85 | **9** | **1.88** | **.935** | — | — | — | — | — | — | — | — |
| 2020–21 | Everett Silvertips | WHL | **22** | **18** | 3 | 0 | **1,298** | 39 | **4** | 1.80 | .940 | — | — | — | — | — | — | — | — |
| 2020–21 | Stockton Heat | AHL | 3 | 2 | 1 | 0 | 148 | 8 | 0 | 3.24 | .895 | — | — | — | — | — | — | — | — |
| 2021–22 | Stockton Heat | AHL | 47 | **33** | 9 | 4 | 2,810 | 110 | 0 | 2.35 | .924 | 13 | 8 | 5 | 809 | 30 | **3** | 2.23 | .929 |
| 2022–23 | Calgary Wranglers | AHL | **55** | **42** | 10 | 2 | **3,239** | 113 | **7** | **2.09** | **.932** | 9 | 5 | 4 | 585 | 26 | 1 | 2.67 | .912 |
| 2022–23 | Calgary Flames | NHL | 1 | 1 | 0 | 0 | 60 | 1 | 0 | 1.00 | .958 | — | — | — | — | — | — | — | — |
| 2023–24 | Calgary Wranglers | AHL | 36 | 20 | 12 | 3 | 2,082 | 85 | 4 | 2.45 | .922 | 6 | 3 | 3 | 360 | 17 | 1 | 2.84 | .924 |
| 2023–24 | Calgary Flames | NHL | 17 | 7 | 7 | 1 | 950 | 50 | 0 | 3.16 | .893 | — | — | — | — | — | — | — | — |
| 2024–25 | Calgary Flames | NHL | 53 | 29 | 16 | 8 | 3,182 | 140 | 3 | 2.64 | .910 | — | — | — | — | — | — | — | — |
| 2025–26 | Calgary Flames | NHL | 57 | 23 | 29 | 3 | 3,149 | 157 | 2 | 2.99 | .899 | — | — | — | — | — | — | — | — |
| NHL totals | | | 128 | 60 | 52 | 12 | 7,342 | 348 | 5 | 2.85 | .903 | — | — | — | — | — | — | — | — |

=== International ===
| Year | Team | Event | Results | GP | W | L | T | MIN | GA | SO | GAA | SV% |
|---|---|---|---|---|---|---|---|---|---|---|---|---|
| 2018 | United States | HG18 | 4th | 3 | 2 | 1 | 0 | 181 | 8 | 1 | 2.65 | .909 |
| 2020 | United States | WJC | 6th | 1 | 1 | 0 | 0 | 60 | 3 | 0 | 3.00 | .850 |
| 2021 | United States | WJC | 1st place, gold medalist(s) | 2 | 1 | 0 | 0 | 86 | 0 | 1 | 0.00 | 1.000 |
| Junior totals | | | | 6 | 4 | 1 | 0 | 327 | 11 | 2 | 2.01 | .915 |

== Awards and honors ==
| Award | Year | Ref |
Junior
| Del Wilson Trophy | 2020, 2021 | |
| Dave Peterson Award | 2020 | |
| Daryl K. (Doc) Seaman Trophy | 2019 | |
| First All-Star Team (Western Conference) | 2019, 2020 | |
| All-Star Team (U.S. Division) | 2021 | |
| CHL Goaltender of the Year | 2020 | |
| CHL Scholastic Player of the Year | 2019 | |
AHL
| Aldege "Baz" Bastien Memorial Award | 2022, 2023 | |
| All-Rookie Team | 2022 | |
| First All-Star Team | 2022, 2023 | |
| Harry "Hap" Holmes Memorial Award | 2023 | |
| Les Cunningham Award | 2023 | |
| President's Award | 2023 | |
NHL
| All-Rookie Team | 2025 | |
