= 2020–21 WHL season =

- League: Western Hockey League
- Sport: Hockey
- Duration: February 26, 2021 – May 12, 2021
- Teams: 22
- TV partner(s): KRCW-TV; KZJO; Sportsnet

Regular season
- Scotty Munro Memorial Trophy: Not awarded
- Season MVP: Peyton Krebs (Winnipeg Ice)
- Top scorer: Peyton Krebs (Winnipeg Ice)

Playoffs
- Finals champions: None (cancelled)

WHL seasons
- 2019–20 2021–22

2020–21 CHL seasons
- League: Canadian Hockey League
- Sport: Hockey
- Duration: OHL; Did not play QMJHL; October 2020–June 2021; WHL; February–May 2021
- Teams: 60
- TV partner(s): TVA Sports; Rogers Sportsnet; Rogers TV; Shaw TV

The 2020–21 WHL season was the 55th season of the Western Hockey League (WHL). The season began on February 26 and ended on May 12.

Due to the ongoing COVID-19 pandemic and a late start, the season was shortened from 68 to 24 games, and the WHL officially termed the season as a "developmental season". Teams played within their respective divisions only: the Central Division consisted exclusively of Alberta-based teams, the U.S. Division played exclusively in Washington state, all B.C.-based teams played from either Sandman Centre or Prospera Place in Kamloops and Kelowna, British Columbia, and all East Division games were played at Brandt Centre in Regina, Saskatchewan.

In Alberta due to protocols agreed upon by the league, a five-day period was required between games involving different opponents. Therefore, all Central Division games were scheduled as home-and-home series on weekends only, and thus no team was scheduled to play more than one opponent per-week.

On April 19, citing logistical issues and interprovincial travel restrictions, and following the cancellation of the 2021 Memorial Cup, the WHL announced that it had cancelled the playoffs. Therefore, no league champion was declared for the second season in a row.

== Standings ==
Map of WHL, 2019–20 to 2022–23
East Division
Central Division
BC Division
US Division

Central Division
| Pos | Team | Pld | W | L | OTL | SOL | GF | GA | Pts |
|---|---|---|---|---|---|---|---|---|---|
| 1 | y, z – Edmonton Oil Kings | 23 | 20 | 2 | 0 | 1 | 104 | 41 | 41 |
| 2 | Medicine Hat Tigers | 23 | 14 | 8 | 0 | 1 | 87 | 69 | 29 |
| 3 | Calgary Hitmen | 21 | 10 | 8 | 3 | 0 | 72 | 79 | 23 |
| 4 | Lethbridge Hurricanes | 24 | 9 | 12 | 3 | 0 | 81 | 108 | 21 |
| 5 | Red Deer Rebels | 23 | 4 | 15 | 4 | 0 | 59 | 106 | 12 |

y – clinched division title; z – clinched conference title

East Division
| Pos | Team | Pld | W | L | OTL | SOL | GF | GA | Pts |
|---|---|---|---|---|---|---|---|---|---|
| 1 | y – Brandon Wheat Kings | 24 | 18 | 4 | 2 | 0 | 104 | 61 | 38 |
| 2 | Winnipeg Ice | 24 | 18 | 5 | 1 | 0 | 100 | 70 | 37 |
| 3 | Saskatoon Blades | 24 | 16 | 5 | 2 | 1 | 80 | 62 | 35 |
| 4 | Prince Albert Raiders | 24 | 9 | 11 | 3 | 1 | 70 | 81 | 22 |
| 5 | Regina Pats | 24 | 9 | 12 | 2 | 1 | 76 | 96 | 21 |
| 6 | Moose Jaw Warriors | 24 | 8 | 13 | 3 | 0 | 71 | 95 | 19 |
| 7 | Swift Current Broncos | 24 | 6 | 16 | 2 | 0 | 72 | 108 | 14 |

y – clinched division title

U.S. Division
| Pos | Team | Pld | W | L | OTL | SOL | GF | GA | Pts |
|---|---|---|---|---|---|---|---|---|---|
| 1 | y – Everett Silvertips | 23 | 19 | 4 | 0 | 0 | 91 | 45 | 38 |
| 2 | Portland Winterhawks | 24 | 13 | 8 | 3 | 0 | 96 | 72 | 29 |
| 3 | Seattle Thunderbirds | 23 | 10 | 12 | 0 | 1 | 67 | 82 | 21 |
| 4 | Spokane Chiefs | 21 | 6 | 10 | 4 | 1 | 55 | 79 | 17 |
| 5 | Tri-City Americans | 19 | 7 | 12 | 0 | 0 | 47 | 78 | 14 |

y – clinched division title

B.C. Division
| Pos | Team | Pld | W | L | OTL | SOL | GF | GA | Pts |
|---|---|---|---|---|---|---|---|---|---|
| 1 | y – Kamloops Blazers | 22 | 18 | 4 | 0 | 0 | 87 | 51 | 36 |
| 2 | Vancouver Giants | 22 | 12 | 10 | 0 | 0 | 71 | 59 | 24 |
| 3 | Kelowna Rockets | 16 | 10 | 5 | 1 | 0 | 58 | 53 | 21 |
| 4 | Prince George Cougars | 22 | 9 | 10 | 2 | 1 | 57 | 62 | 21 |
| 5 | Victoria Royals | 22 | 3 | 17 | 1 | 1 | 48 | 96 | 8 |

y – clinched division title

== Statistics ==
=== Scoring leaders ===
Players are listed by points, then goals.

Note: GP = Games played; G = Goals; A = Assists; Pts. = Points; PIM = Penalty minutes

| Player | Team | GP | G | A | Pts | PIM |
|---|---|---|---|---|---|---|
| Peyton Krebs | Winnipeg Ice | 24 | 13 | 30 | 43 | 28 |
| Ben McCartney | Brandon Wheat Kings | 24 | 13 | 24 | 37 | 29 |
| Cole Fonstad | Everett Silvertips | 23 | 16 | 18 | 34 | 14 |
| Gage Goncalves | Everett Silvertips | 23 | 12 | 22 | 34 | 12 |
| Justin Sourdif | Vancouver Giants | 22 | 11 | 23 | 34 | 29 |
| Connor McClennon | Winnipeg Ice | 24 | 14 | 19 | 33 | 27 |
| Jake Neighbours | Edmonton Oil Kings | 19 | 9 | 24 | 33 | 17 |
| Tristen Nielsen | Vancouver Giants | 22 | 15 | 17 | 32 | 14 |
| Ridly Greig | Brandon Wheat Kings | 21 | 10 | 22 | 32 | 39 |
| Kyle Crnkovic | Saskatoon Blades | 24 | 10 | 22 | 32 | 8 |

=== Leading goaltenders ===
These are the goaltenders that lead the league in GAA that have played at least 420 minutes.

Note: GP = Games played; Mins = Minutes played; W = Wins; L = Losses; OTL = Overtime losses; SOL = Shootout Losses; SO = Shutouts; GAA = Goals against average; Sv% = Save percentage

| Player | Team | GP | Mins | W | L | OTL | SOL | SO | GAA | Sv% |
|---|---|---|---|---|---|---|---|---|---|---|
| Sebastian Cossa | Edmonton Oil Kings | 19 | 1144 | 17 | 1 | 0 | 1 | 4 | 1.57 | 0.941 |
| Dustin Wolf | Everett Silvertips | 22 | 1298 | 18 | 3 | 0 | 0 | 4 | 1.80 | 0.940 |
| Dylan Garand | Kamloops Blazers | 18 | 1086 | 15 | 3 | 0 | 0 | 3 | 2.15 | 0.921 |
| Trent Miner | Vancouver Giants | 15 | 832 | 7 | 8 | 0 | 0 | 4 | 2.16 | 0.915 |
| Gage Alexander | Winnipeg Ice | 9 | 538 | 6 | 3 | 0 | 0 | 1 | 2.23 | 0.917 |

== WHL awards ==
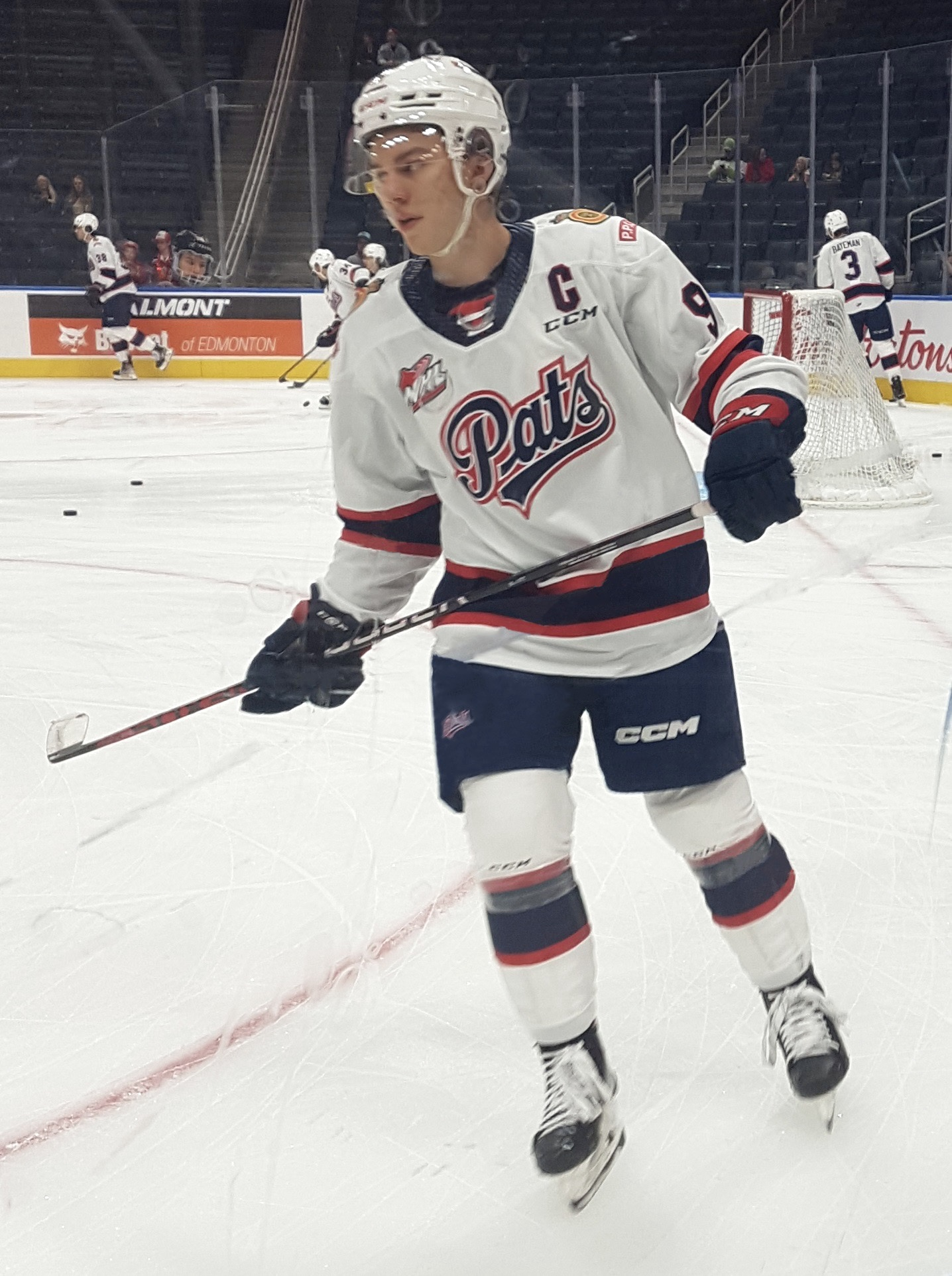
Connor Bedard was awarded the Jim Piggott Memorial Trophy as rookie of the year

| Award | Name | Winner |
|---|---|---|
| WHL Champions | Ed Chynoweth Cup | Not Awarded |
| Regular season champions | Scotty Munro Memorial Trophy | not awarded |
| Player of the Year | Four Broncos Memorial Trophy | Peyton Krebs, Winnipeg Ice |
| Top Scorer | Bob Clarke Trophy | Peyton Krebs, Winnipeg Ice |
| Top Defenceman | Bill Hunter Memorial Trophy | Braden Schneider, Brandon Wheat Kings |
| Rookie of the Year | Jim Piggott Memorial Trophy | Connor Bedard, Regina Pats |
| Top Goaltender | Del Wilson Trophy | Dustin Wolf, Everett Silvertips |
| Top Plus-Minus Rating | WHL Plus-Minus Award | Jake Neighbours, Edmonton Oil Kings |
| Most Sportsmanlike Player | Brad Hornung Trophy | Eli Zummack, Spokane Chiefs |
| Scholastic Player of the Year | Daryl K. (Doc) Seaman Trophy | Ethan Peters, Edmonton Oil Kings |
| Scholastic team of the Year | Jim Donlevy Memorial Trophy | not awarded |
| Coach of the Year | Dunc McCallum Memorial Trophy | |
| Executive of the Year | Lloyd Saunders Memorial Trophy | |
| Top Official | Allen Paradice Memorial Trophy | |
| Marketing/Public Relations Award | St. Clair Group Trophy | |
| Humanitarian of the Year | Doug Wickenheiser Memorial Trophy | |
| WHL Finals Most Valuable Player | airBC Trophy | Not Awarded |
| Alumni Achievement Awards | Professional Hockey Achievement; Academic Recipient | not awarded |

== See also ==
- List of WHL seasons
- 2020–21 OHL season
- 2020–21 QMJHL season
- 2020 in ice hockey

| Preceded by 2019–20 WHL season | WHL seasons | Succeeded by 2021–22 WHL season |
