= 2019–20 WHL season =

- League: Western Hockey League
- Sport: Ice hockey
- Duration: September 20, 2019 – March 18, 2020
- Teams: 22
- TV partner(s): KRCW-TV, KZJO, Sportsnet

Regular season
- Scotty Munro Memorial Trophy: Portland Winterhawks (4)
- Season MVP: Adam Beckman (Spokane Chiefs)
- Top scorer: Adam Beckman (Spokane Chiefs)

Playoffs
- Finals champions: None (cancelled)

WHL seasons
- 2018–19 2020–21

2019–20 CHL seasons
- League: Canadian Hockey League
- Sport: Hockey
- Duration: OHL; September 2019 – March 2020; QMJHL; September 2019 – March 2020; WHL; September 2019 – March 2020
- Teams: 60
- TV partner(s): TVA Sports, Rogers Sportsnet, Rogers TV, Shaw TV
- Season MVP: Alexis Lafrenière (Rimouski Océanic) (QMJHL)
- Top scorer: Marco Rossi (Ottawa 67's) (OHL)

Memorial Cup
- Finals champions: None (cancelled)

The 2019–20 WHL season was the 54th season of the Western Hockey League (WHL). The regular season began on September 20, 2019, and was scheduled to end on March 22, 2020. Due to the COVID-19 pandemic in North America the regular season was suspended on March 12 and cancelled six days later along with the playoffs. The post-season had been scheduled to begin on March 27, in which sixteen teams would have competed for the Ed Chynoweth Cup.

This was the first season for the Winnipeg Ice after being moved to Winnipeg, Manitoba, from Cranbrook, British Columbia.

== Suspension and cancellation of season ==
On March 12, the WHL suspended the season until further notice due to the COVID-19 pandemic. Six days later, on March 18, the WHL cancelled the remainder of the regular season, but stated its intention to hold playoffs at a later time. The final WHL standings are based on win percentage for all clubs. The Portland Winterhawks were awarded the Scotty Munro Memorial Trophy as regular season champions.

=== Cancellation of playoffs and Memorial Cup ===
On March 23, the WHL announced that it had cancelled the playoffs due to the COVID-19 pandemic. The Canadian Hockey League cancelled the 2020 Memorial Cup, which had been scheduled to take place in Kelowna, British Columbia.

== Final standings ==
Map of WHL, 2019–20 to 2022–23
East Division
Central Division
BC Division
US Division

Central division: Top 3
Pos	Team	Pld	W	L	OTL	SOL	GF	GA	Pts
1	x, y – Edmonton Oil Kings	64	42	12	6	4	239	167	94
2	x – Medicine Hat Tigers	63	41	19	2	1	265	182	85
3	x – Lethbridge Hurricanes	63	37	19	2	5	249	193	81

x – clinched playoff berth; y – clinched division title

East division: Top 3
Pos	Team	Pld	W	L	OTL	SOL	GF	GA	Pts
1	x, y – Prince Albert Raiders	64	36	18	6	4	210	160	82
2	x – Winnipeg Ice	63	38	24	1	0	231	207	77
3	x – Brandon Wheat Kings	63	35	22	4	2	227	173	76

x – clinched playoff berth; y – clinched division title

Eastern Conference wild card: Top 2 qualify for playoffs
Pos	Div	Team	Pld	W	L	OTL	SOL	GF	GA	Pts
1	Cen.	x – Calgary Hitmen	64	35	24	4	1	219	201	75
2	East	x – Saskatoon Blades	63	34	24	2	3	211	197	73
3	Cen.	Red Deer Rebels	63	24	33	3	3	181	250	54
4	East	Regina Pats	63	21	34	6	2	183	258	50
5	East	Moose Jaw Warriors	62	14	44	4	0	146	291	32
6	Cen.	Swift Current Broncos	63	10	48	2	3	129	298	25

x – clinched playoff berth

U.S. division: Top 3
Pos	Team	Pld	W	L	OTL	SOL	GF	GA	Pts
1	x, y, z – Portland Winterhawks	63	45	11	3	4	270	164	97
2	x – Everett Silvertips	63	46	13	3	1	228	142	96
3	x – Spokane Chiefs	64	41	18	4	1	258	179	87

x – clinched playoff berth; y – clinched division title; z – clinched conference title

B.C. division: Top 3
Pos	Team	Pld	W	L	OTL	SOL	GF	GA	Pts
1	x, y – Kamloops Blazers	63	41	18	3	1	271	166	86
2	x – Victoria Royals	64	32	24	6	2	176	190	72
3	x – Vancouver Giants	62	32	24	4	2	189	166	70

x – clinched playoff berth; y – clinched division title

Western Conference wild card: Top 2 qualify for playoffs
Pos	Div	Team	Pld	W	L	OTL	SOL	GF	GA	Pts
1	B.C.	x – Kelowna Rockets	63	29	28	3	3	181	208	64
2	U.S.	x – Seattle Thunderbirds	63	24	32	4	3	175	240	55
3	B.C.	Prince George Cougars	62	20	34	4	4	144	205	48
4	U.S.	Tri-City Americans	63	17	40	4	2	157	302	40

x – clinched playoff berth

== Statistics ==
=== Scoring leaders ===
Players are listed by points, then goals.

Note: GP = Games played; G = Goals; A = Assists; Pts. = Points; PIM = Penalty minutes

Player	Team	GP	G	A	Pts	PIM
Adam Beckman	Spokane Chiefs	63	48	59	107	18
Seth Jarvis	Portland Winterhawks	58	42	56	98	24
James Hamblin	Medicine Hat Tigers	63	36	56	92	35
Zane Franklin	Kamloops Blazers	63	29	62	91	89
Connor Zary	Kamloops Blazers	57	38	48	86	51
Eli Zummack	Spokane Chiefs	64	22	64	86	18
Dylan Cozens	Lethbridge Hurricanes	51	38	47	85	38
Orrin Centazzo	Kamloops Blazers	63	44	37	81	33
Aliaksei Protas	Prince Albert Raiders	58	31	49	80	8
Brett Kemp	Medicine Hat Tigers	62	30	47	77	43

=== Leading goaltenders ===
These are the goaltenders that lead the league in GAA that have played at least 1500 minutes.

Note: GP = Games played; Mins = Minutes played; W = Wins; L = Losses; OTL = Overtime losses; SOL = Shootout Losses; SO = Shutouts; GAA = Goals against average; Sv% = Save percentage

Player	Team	GP	Mins	W	L	OTL	SOL	SO	GAA	Sv%
Dustin Wolf	Everett Silvertips	46	2713	34	10	2	0	9	1.88	0.935
Shane Farkas	Victoria Royals	28	1585	18	7	1	0	2	2.20	0.929
Dylan Garand	Kamloops Blazers	42	2443	28	10	2	1	4	2.21	0.921
Sebastian Cossa	Edmonton Oil Kings	33	1880	21	6	2	1	4	2.23	0.921
David Tendeck	Vancouver Giants	35	2017	18	13	1	1	3	2.29	0.920

== WHL awards ==
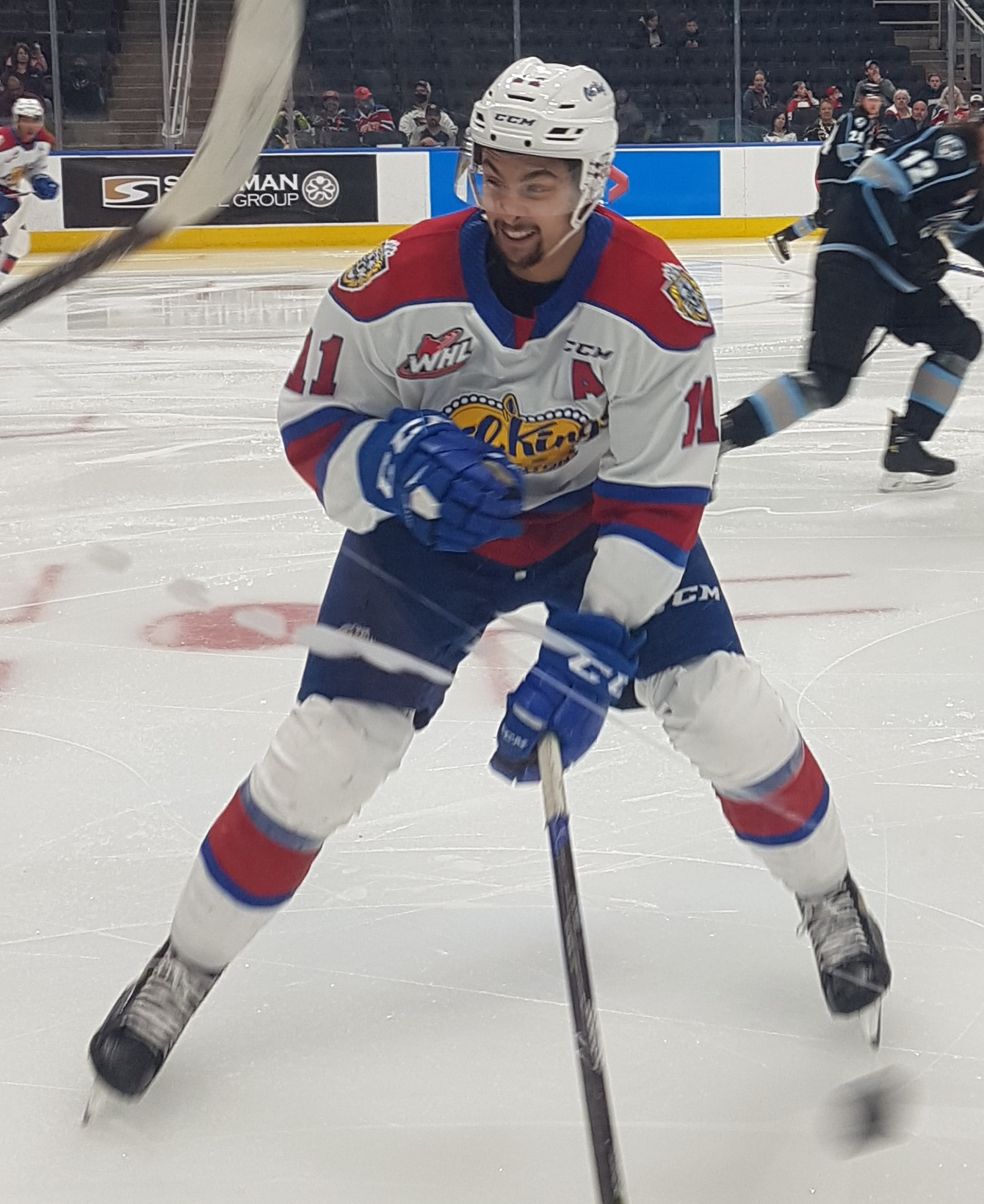
Dylan Guenther was awarded the Jim Piggott Memorial Trophy as the league's rookie of the year

Name	Award	Winner
Ed Chynoweth Cup	WHL Champions	Not Awarded
Scotty Munro Memorial Trophy	Regular season champions	Portland Winterhawks
Four Broncos Memorial Trophy	Player of the Year	Adam Beckman, Spokane Chiefs
Bob Clarke Trophy	Top Scorer	Adam Beckman, Spokane Chiefs
Bill Hunter Memorial Trophy	Top Defenceman	Ty Smith, Spokane Chiefs
Jim Piggott Memorial Trophy	Rookie of the Year	Dylan Guenther, Edmonton Oil Kings
Del Wilson Trophy	Top Goaltender	Dustin Wolf, Everett Silvertips
WHL Plus-Minus Award	Top Plus-Minus Rating	Noah King, Spokane Chiefs
Brad Hornung Trophy	Most Sportsmanlike Player	Seth Jarvis, Portland Winterhawks
Daryl K. (Doc) Seaman Trophy	Scholastic Player of the Year	Dylan Garand, Kamloops Blazers
Jim Donlevy Memorial Trophy	Scholastic team of the Year	Kamloops Blazers
Dunc McCallum Memorial Trophy	Coach of the Year	Brad Lauer, Edmonton Oil Kings
Lloyd Saunders Memorial Trophy	Executive of the Year	Peter Anholt, Lethbridge Hurricanes
Allen Paradice Memorial Trophy	Top Official	Jeff Ingram
St. Clair Group Trophy	Marketing/Public Relations Award	Lethbridge Hurricanes
Doug Wickenheiser Memorial Trophy	Humanitarian of the Year	Riley Fiddler-Schultz, Calgary Hitmen
WHL Playoff MVP	WHL Finals Most Valuable Player	Not Awarded
Professional Hockey Achievement; Academic Recipient	Alumni Achievement Awards	Marian Hossa

=== All-Star teams ===
==== Eastern Conference ====
First Team		Pos.	Second Team	
Player	Team	Pos.	Player	Team
Jiri Patera	Brandon Wheat Kings	G	Max Paddock	Prince Albert Raiders
Calen Addison	Lethbridge Hurricanes	D	Alex Cotton	Lethbridge Hurricanes
Braden Schneider	Brandon Wheat Kings	D	Matthew Robertson	Edmonton Oil Kings
Dylan Cozens	Lethbridge Hurricanes	F	Mark Kastelic	Calgary Hitmen
James Hamblin	Medicine Hat Tigers	F	Peyton Krebs	Winnipeg Ice
Aliaksei Protas	Prince Albert Raiders	F	Riley Sawchuk	Edmonton Oil Kings

==== Western Conference ====
First Team		Pos.	Second Team	
Player	Team	Pos.	Player	Team
Dustin Wolf	Everett Silvertips	G	Joel Hofer	Portland Winterhawks
John Ludvig	Portland Winterhawks	D	Bowen Byram	Vancouver Giants
Ty Smith	Spokane Chiefs	D	Jake Christiansen	Everett Silvertips
Adam Beckman	Spokane Chiefs	F	Zane Franklin	Kamloops Blazers
Seth Jarvis	Portland Winterhawks	F	Bryce Kindopp	Everett Silvertips
Connor Zary	Kamloops Blazers	F	Eli Zummack	Spokane Chiefs

== Attendance ==
Team	Home average
Edmonton	7,008
Calgary	6,742
Everett	5,730
Spokane	5,709
Portland	5,540
Kelowna	5,136
Seattle	4,735
Regina	4,710
Victoria	4,638
Kamloops	4,178
Lethbridge	3,969
Red Deer	3,963
Vancouver	3,919
Tri-City	3,729
Saskatoon	3,605
Brandon	3,489
Moose Jaw	2,981
Medicine Hat	2,946
Prince Albert	2,641
Prince George	2,433
Swift Current	1,953
Winnipeg	1,512
Total Average	4,153
Total	2,882,799
total games	694

== See also ==
- List of WHL seasons
- 2019–20 OHL season
- 2019–20 QMJHL season
- 2019 in ice hockey
- 2020 in ice hockey

Preceded by 2018–19 WHL season	WHL seasons	Succeeded by 2020–21 WHL season
