= Everett Silvertips =

Western Hockey League team in Everett, Washington

- City: Everett, Washington
- League: Western Hockey League
- Conference: Western
- Division: U.S.
- Founded: 2003
- Home arena: Angel of the Winds Arena
- Colors: Forest Green, White, Silver
- General manager: Mike Fraser
- Head coach: Steve Hamilton
- Website: chl.ca/whl-silvertips

Championships
- Regular season titles: 3 (2006–07, 2024–25, 2025–26)
- Playoff championships: Ed Chynoweth Cup; 1 (2025–26); Conference Championships; 3 (2003–04, 2017–18, 2025–26)

Current uniform

The Everett Silvertips are an American major junior ice hockey team based in Everett, Washington. The team plays in the U.S. Division of the Western Conference of the Western Hockey League (WHL), and hosts games at Angel of the Winds Arena. The Silvertips joined the WHL as an expansion team ahead of the 2003–04 season. The team has not missed the playoffs in its 21-year history and won their first Ed Chynoweth Cup in the 2025–26 season after two previous defeats in the final.

== History ==
The city of Everett, with plans to build a new downtown arena complex, applied for a WHL franchise and was awarded conditional approval for an expansion franchise from the league in 2001. With the new team falling within the territorial rights of the Seattle Thunderbirds, Seattle ownership was given right of first refusal to purchase the new team; Bill Yuill decided to sell the Thunderbirds in order to take over the new expansion club. The new multi-million dollar complex, the Everett Events Centre, was completed ahead of the team's inaugural season, offering a seating capacity of 8,200. In 2003, the team hired former National Hockey League coach Kevin Constantine to be its first head coach.

Beginning play in the 2003–04 season with a roster built through an expansion draft, the Silvertips rapidly established themselves as the best expansion team in league history. By January, Everett posted its 19th win of the season, breaking the previous expansion record of 18 wins posted by the 1995–96 Calgary Hitmen. The team would go on to win 35 games and finish atop the U.S. Division standings. In the playoffs, the Silvertips advanced all the way to the league final, upsetting the defending champion and heavily-favored Kelowna Rockets in the Western Conference final, with defender Mitch Love opening the series with an overtime goal. The team faced the Medicine Hat Tigers in the championship series, losing four straight games to fall short of the title. By the end of the year, the Silvertips, who earned a reputation as a disciplined defensive team, had set new records for an expansion team in every category. Constantine was named the league's coach-of-the-year.

Three seasons later, the Silvertips won the Scotty Munro Memorial Trophy for the best regular season record after its 54-win, 111-point season, before losing in the second round of the playoffs. That season, the team's first ever bantam draft selection, Zach Hamill, became the first Silvertip to lead the WHL in scoring.

The team's success on the ice translated into fan support, and the Silvertips earned a reputation for drawing strong crowds—more than a decade into the team's history, the Silvertips were in the top half of the league in attendance.

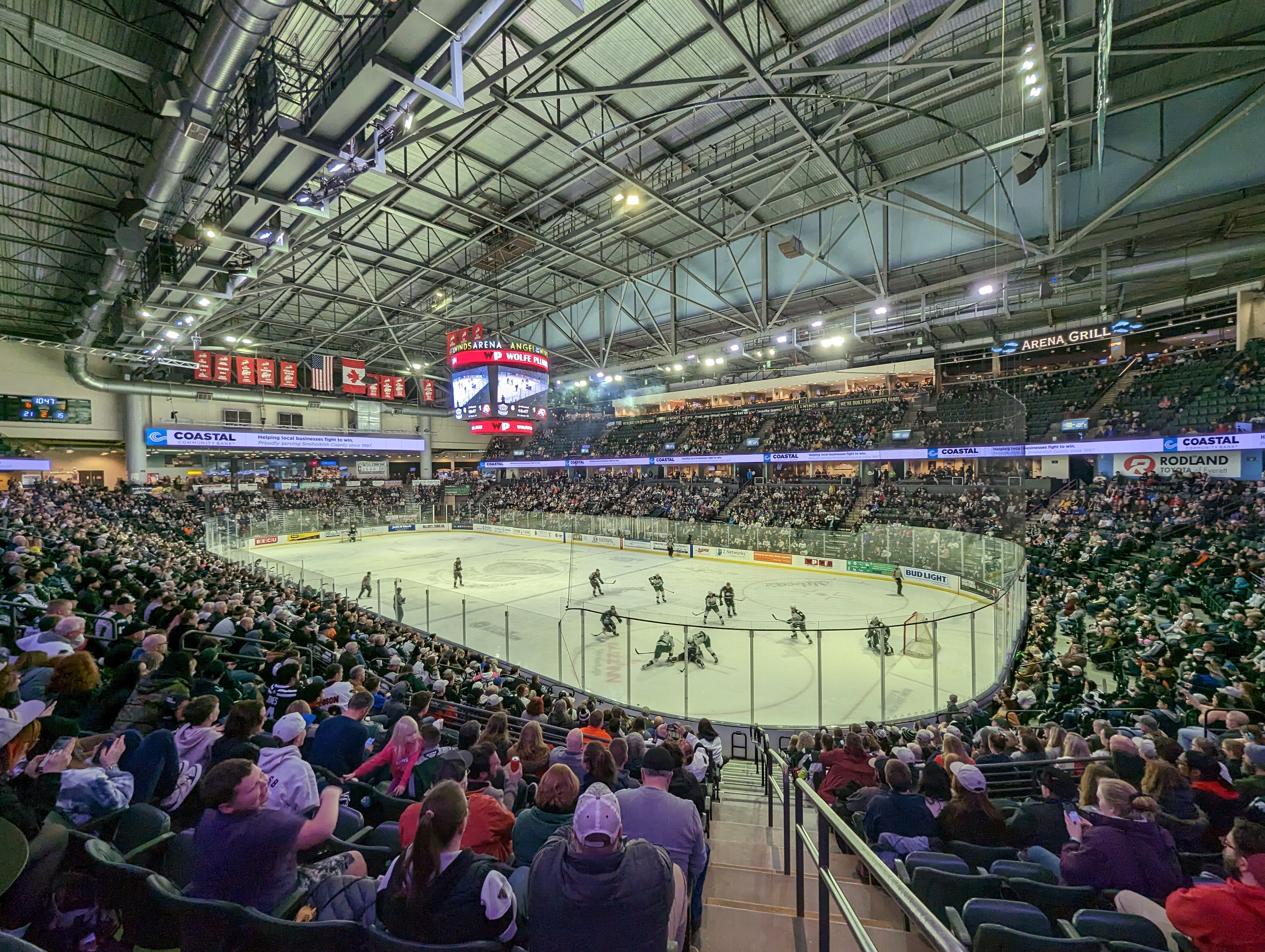
Everett hosting the Portland Winterhawks at Angel of the Winds Arena in March 2023.

Everett established itself as a perennial playoff team, and in 2017–18, led by goaltender Carter Hart and coach Dennis Williams, the Silvertips made a second run to the league championship series. After a 47-win season, the team's best since 2007, Everett faced the Swift Current Broncos in the playoff finals, ultimately losing the series in six games. Hart's dominant season—he was named the league's best player, on top of being named its best goaltender for a third straight season—added to the team's historic reputation for exceptional goaltending. After Hart turned professional, Dustin Wolf was named top goaltender two years in a row.

Ahead of the 2024 playoffs, it was announced that long-time coach and manager Williams would be leaving the Silvertips after the season.

Led by defenceman Landon DuPont, only the second WHL player awarded exceptional player status, the Silvertips won back-to-back regular season titles in 2024–25 and 2025–26. In 2026, the Silvertips won their first Ed Chynoweth Cup as WHL champions, defeating Prince Albert Raiders in the playoff finals. This earned Everett its first trip to the Memorial Cup tournament, which in 2026 was hosted by the Kelowna Rockets. The Silvertips advanced to the tournament final, but were defeated by the Kitchener Rangers.

=== Rivals ===
The Silvertips have formed an enduring rivalry with the nearby Seattle Thunderbirds. The teams have met regularly in the playoffs, including a three-year stretch between 2016 and 2018 where the winner of the series between the two made it all the way to the championship series.

== Name and logos ==
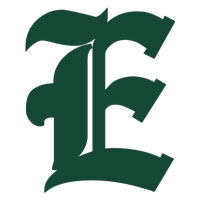
Logo unveiled for the Silvertips' 15th anniversary in 2017–18.

The team adopted the "Silvertips" name after the grizzly bears of the Pacific Northwest. The team opted for a green and silver color-scheme. Ahead of their inaugural season, the team introduced a bear mascot, Lincoln, named after the aircraft carrier USS Abraham Lincoln, which was stationed at Naval Station Everett at the time.

== Season-by-season record ==
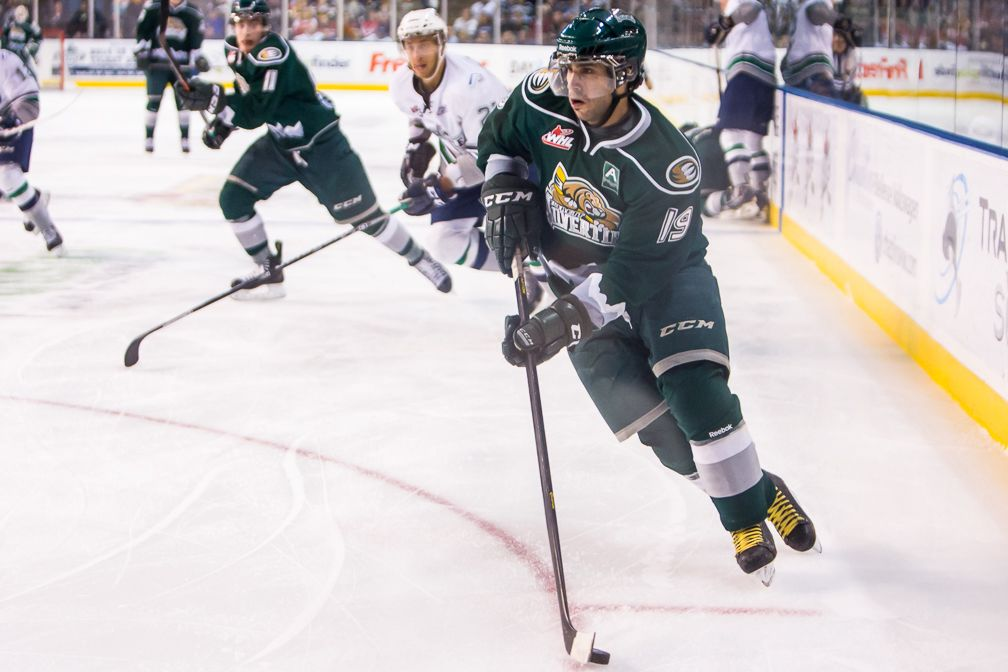
Manraj Hayer played for the Silvertips between 2010 and 2014.

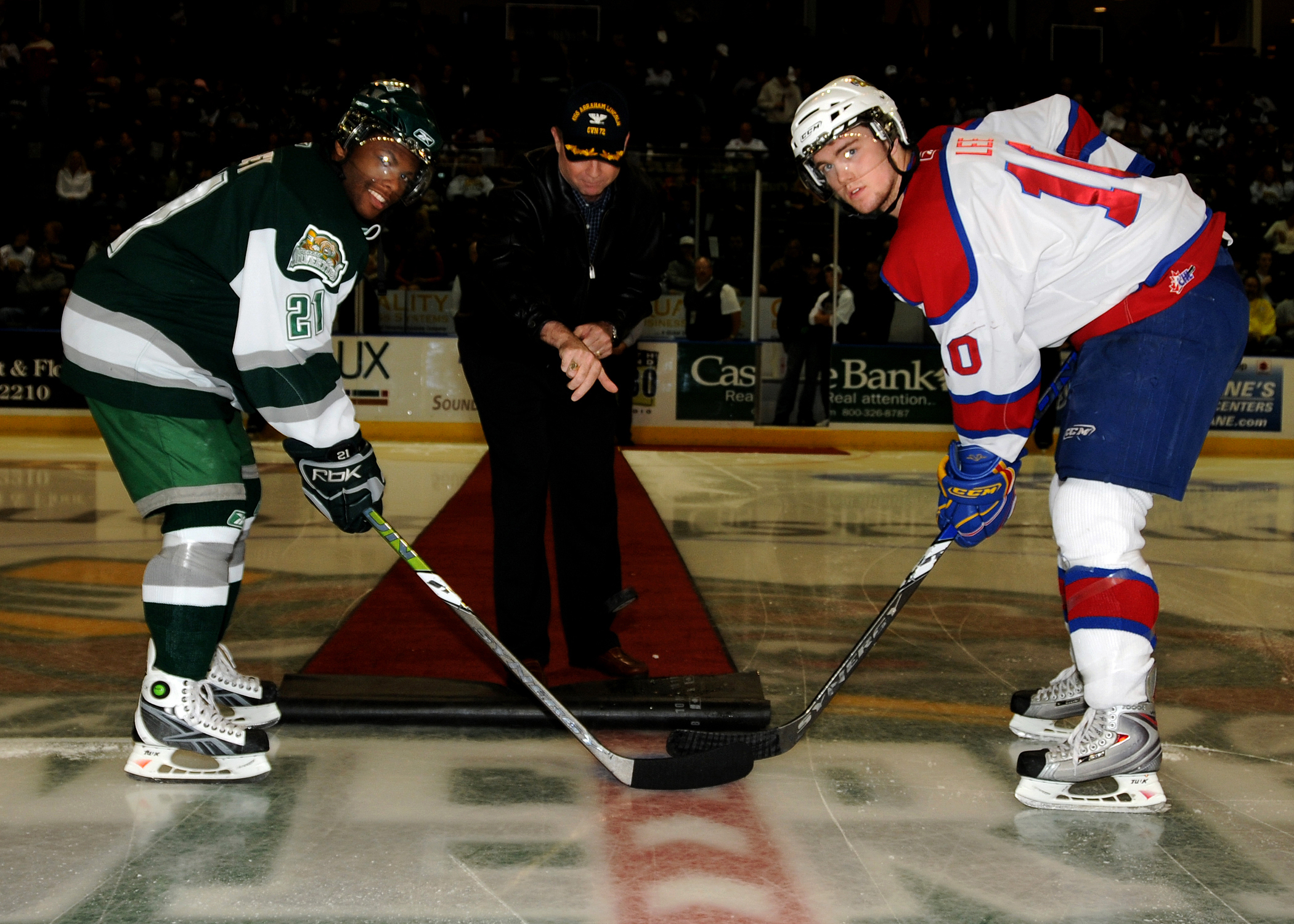
Ceremonial face-off ahead of a Silvertips home game in 2008.

Note: GP = Games played, W = Wins, L = Losses, T = Ties, OTL = Overtime losses, SOL = Shootout losses, Pts = Points, GF = Goals for, GA = Goals against

Season	GP	W	L	OTL	SOL	GF	GA	Points	Finish	Playoffs
2003–04	72	35	27	8	2	157	153	80	1st U.S.	Lost final
2004–05	72	33	28	9	2	167	149	77	3rd U.S.	Lost Western Conference semifinal
2005–06	72	40	27	2	3	203	158	85	1st U.S.	Lost Western Conference final
2006–07	72	54	15	1	2	239	142	111	1st WHL	Lost Western Conference semifinal
2007–08	72	39	30	0	3	205	198	81	4th U.S.	Lost Western Conference quarterfinal
2008–09	72	27	36	7	2	199	259	63	4th U.S.	Lost Western Conference quarterfinal
2009–10	72	46	21	3	2	232	175	97	2nd U.S.	Lost Western Conference quarterfinal
2010–11	72	28	33	7	4	172	218	67	4th U.S.	Lost Western Conference quarterfinal
2011–12	72	22	40	2	8	185	268	54	4th U.S.	Lost Western Conference quarterfinal
2012–13	72	25	40	3	4	172	268	57	5th U.S.	Lost Western Conference quarterfinal
2013–14	72	39	23	7	3	218	206	88	3rd U.S.	Lost Western Conference quarterfinal
2014–15	72	43	20	3	6	242	199	95	1st U.S.	Lost Western Conference semifinal
2015–16	72	38	26	5	3	182	172	84	2nd U.S.	Lost Western Conference semifinal
2016–17	72	44	16	9	3	229	169	100	1st U.S.	Lost Western Conference semifinal
2017–18	72	47	20	2	3	246	167	99	1st U.S.	Lost final
2018–19	68	47	16	2	3	223	130	99	1st U.S.	Lost Western Conference semifinal
2019–20	63	46	13	3	1	228	142	96	2nd U.S.	Cancelled due to the COVID-19 pandemic
2020–21	23	19	4	0	0	91	45	38	1st U.S.	No playoffs held due to COVID-19 pandemic
2021–22	68	45	13	5	5	280	190	100	1st U.S.	Lost Western Conference quarterfinal
2022–23	68	33	32	2	1	221	245	69	4th U.S.	Lost Western Conference quarterfinal
2023–24	68	45	18	2	3	296	208	95	2nd U.S.	Lost Western Conference semifinal
2024–25	68	48	12	4	4	277	178	104	1st WHL	Lost Western Conference semifinal
2025–26	68	57	8	2	1	304	173	117	1st WHL	Won Championship

=== WHL Championship history ===
- Ed Chynoweth Cup (1): 2025–26
- Scotty Munro Memorial Trophy (3): 2006–07, 2024–25, 2025–26
- Conference champions (3): 2003–04, 2017–18, 2025–26
- Regular season division titles (11): 2003–04, 2005–06, 2006–07, 2014–15, 2016–17, 2017–18, 2018–19, 2020–21, 2021–22, 2024–25, 2025–26

WHL championship series

- 2003–04: Loss, 0–4 vs. Medicine Hat Tigers
- 2017–18: Loss, 2–4 vs. Swift Current Broncos
- 2025–26: Won, 4–1 vs. Prince Albert Raiders

Memorial Cup finals

- 2026: Loss, 2–6 vs. Kitchener Rangers

== Players ==
=== First round NHL draft picks ===
List of Silvertips players selected in the first round of the NHL entry draft.

Year	Pick	Player	Team	Hometown
2006	8	Peter Mueller	Phoenix Coyotes	Bloomington, Minnesota
2006	26	Leland Irving	Calgary Flames	Swan Hills, Alberta
2007	8	Zach Hamill	Boston Bruins	Port Coquitlam, British Columbia
2008	11	Kyle Beach	Chicago Blackhawks	Kelowna, British Columbia
2012	2	Ryan Murray	Columbus Blue Jackets	White City, Saskatchewan
2013	18	Mirco Mueller	San Jose Sharks	Winterthur, Switzerland
2014	26	Nikita Scherbak	Montreal Canadiens	Moscow, Russia
2015	26	Noah Juulsen	Montreal Canadiens	Abbotsford, British Columbia
2025	13	Carter Bear	Detroit Red Wings	Winnipeg, Manitoba

=== NHL alumni ===
List of Silvertips who went on to play in the NHL:

- Riley Armstrong
- Ivan Baranka
- Jake Christiansen
- Connor Dewar
- Landon Ferraro
- Byron Froese
- Gage Goncalves
- Radko Gudas
- Zach Hamill
- Shane Harper
- Carter Hart
- Shaun Heshka
- Leland Irving
- Noah Juulsen
- Jujhar Khaira
- Bryce Kindopp
- Mirco Mueller
- Peter Mueller
- Ryan Murray
- Garrett Pilon
- Rasmus Rissanen
- Nikita Scherbak
- Kent Simpson
- Mike Wall
- Dustin Wolf
- Olen Zellweger

=== Retired numbers ===
Players who have had their numbers retired by the Silvertips:

#	Player	Ref.
2	Mitch Love	

== Awards ==
- Four Broncos Memorial Trophy
  - Carter Hart: 2017–18
- Bob Clarke Trophy (WHL top scorer)
  - Zach Hamill: 2006–07
- Daryl K. (Doc) Seaman Trophy (WHL scholastic player of the year)
  - Brian King: 2016–17
  - Dustin Wolf: 2018–19
- Del Wilson Trophy (WHL goaltender of the year)
  - Carter Hart: 2015–16, 2016–17, 2017–18
  - Dustin Wolf: 2019–20, 2020–21
- Jim Piggott Memorial Trophy (WHL rookie of the year)
  - Peter Mueller: 2005–06
  - Kyle Beach: 2006–07
  - Landon DuPont: 2024–25
- Dunc McCallum Memorial Trophy (WHL coach of the year)
  - Kevin Constantine: 2003–04
- CHL Rookie of the Year Award
  - Landon DuPont: 2024–25
