= 2023–24 Ottawa Senators season =

National Hockey League season

2023–24 Ottawa Senators
- Division: 7th Atlantic
- Conference: 14th Eastern
- 2023–24 record: 37–41–4
- Home record: 21–18–2
- Road record: 16–23–2
- Goals for: 255
- Goals against: 281

Team information
- General manager: Pierre Dorion (Oct. 11 – Nov. 1); Steve Staios (Nov. 1 – Apr 16)
- Coach: D. J. Smith (Oct. 11 – Dec. 18); Jacques Martin (Dec. 18 – Apr 16)
- Captain: Brady Tkachuk
- Alternate captains: Thomas Chabot; Claude Giroux
- Arena: Canadian Tire Centre
- Average attendance: 17,822
- Minor league affiliates: Belleville Senators (AHL); Allen Americans (ECHL)

Team leaders
- Goals: Brady Tkachuk (37)
- Assists: Tim Stutzle (52)
- Points: Brady Tkachuk (74)
- Penalty minutes: Brady Tkachuk (132)
- Plus/minus: Vladimir Tarasenko (+13)
- Wins: Joonas Korpisalo (21)
- Goals against average: Anton Forsberg (3.21)

The 2023–24 Ottawa Senators season was the 32nd season of the Ottawa Senators of the National Hockey League (NHL). The Senators failed to return to the Stanley Cup playoffs for the seventh straight season after losing 4–3 to the New Jersey Devils on April 6, 2024 at the 76th game of the season. This was the Senators' first season under the new ownership of Michael Andlauer.

== Off-season ==
The biggest change for the Senators was the change in ownership, from the estate of the late Eugene Melnyk to the ownership of a group of investors led by Michael Andlauer. The change became official in September 2023. Andlauer made changes in the executive staff, bringing back founder Cyril Leeder as CEO and club president, and Steve Staios as president of hockey operations.

On the ice, the team traded Alex DeBrincat to the Detroit Red Wings, in return for Dominik Kubalik, prospect Donovan Sebrango and two draft picks. In free agency, the Senators picked up goaltender Joonas Korpisalo, and forwards Vladimir Tarasenko and Zack MacEwen.

== Regular season ==
The Senators started the season with centre Shane Pinto unsigned as a restricted free agent. Speculation in the media was that the Senators did not have salary cap room and would have to trade a player. However, the NHL announced on October 26 a 41-game suspension of Pinto due to gambling activities. The Senators had been advised prior to the start of the season. The suspension was negotiated with the National Hockey League Players' Association (NHLPA) and back-dated to the start of the season. The NHL stated that there was no evidence that Pinto had bet on NHL games himself. As a condition of the suspension, Pinto will not require special permission to return to the NHL and can re-sign with the Senators at any time before the 42nd game of the season to be able to play this season.

On November 1, 2023, the NHL announced that the Senators would forfeit a first-round pick in either the 2024, 2025 or 2026 NHL Entry Drafts. This was levied by the NHL as punishment for failing to disclose the no-trade list of Evgeni Dadonov to the Vegas Golden Knights when he was traded to the Knights. The list came to light when the Knights attempted to trade Dadonov to the Anaheim Ducks, a team on the no-trade list. The trade was nullified by the NHL. Also on November 1, 2023 the team announced the departure of general manager Pierre Dorion, as a 'mutual parting of ways.' Hockey president Steve Staios took over as interim general manager. The Senators played two games in Stockholm at the Avicii Arena on November 16 and 18 as part of the NHL Global Series.

After a four-game losing streak, and the Senators in the Eastern Conference basement, the Senators fired head coach D. J. Smith and assistant coach Davis Payne on December 18, 2023. Coaching advisor Jacques Martin, a former head coach of the Senators, was named interim head coach. Former player Daniel Alfredsson replaced Payne as assistant coach. Changes continued as Staios was named permanent general manager, the team added Dave Poulin as vice-president of hockey operations in late December. In January 2024, Zac Bierk was relieved of his goaltending coach duties and re-assigned as a scout within the organization and was replaced by Justin Peters.

The Senators missed the playoffs again. The team finished 13 points behind the final wild card position, held by the Washington Capitals.

After the season, on May 7, the Senators announced their new head coach Travis Green, a former head coach with the Vancouver Canucks, and former player.

== Standings ==
=== Divisional standings ===
Atlantic Division
Pos	Team	GP	W	L	OTL	RW	GF	GA	GD	Pts
1	y – Florida Panthers	82	52	24	6	42	268	200	+68	110
2	x – Boston Bruins	82	47	20	15	36	267	224	+43	109
3	x – Toronto Maple Leafs	82	46	26	10	33	303	263	+40	102
4	x – Tampa Bay Lightning	82	45	29	8	37	291	268	+23	98
5	Detroit Red Wings	82	41	32	9	27	278	274	+4	91
6	Buffalo Sabres	82	39	37	6	33	246	244	+2	84
7	Ottawa Senators	82	37	41	4	25	255	281	−26	78
8	Montreal Canadiens	82	30	36	16	20	236	289	−53	76

Source: National Hockey League
Rules for classification: 1) Fewer number of games played (GP, only during regular season); 2) Greater number of regulation wins (RW); 3) Greater number of wins in regulation and overtime, excluding shootout wins (ROW); 4) Greater number of total wins, including shootouts (W); 5) Greater number of points earned in head-to-head play; if teams played an uneven number of head-to-head games, the result of the first game on the home ice of the team with the extra home game is discarded; 6) Greater goal differential (GD); 7) Greater number of goals scored (GF)
x – Clinched playoff spot; y – Clinched division

=== Conference standings ===
Eastern Conference Wild Card
Pos	Div	Team	GP	W	L	OTL	RW	GF	GA	GD	Pts
1	AT	x – Tampa Bay Lightning	82	45	29	8	37	291	268	+23	98
2	ME	x – Washington Capitals	82	40	31	11	32	220	257	−37	91
3	AT	Detroit Red Wings	82	41	32	9	27	278	274	+4	91
4	ME	Pittsburgh Penguins	82	38	32	12	32	255	251	+4	88
5	ME	Philadelphia Flyers	82	38	33	11	30	235	261	−26	87
6	AT	Buffalo Sabres	82	39	37	6	33	246	244	+2	84
7	ME	New Jersey Devils	82	38	39	5	33	264	283	−19	81
8	AT	Ottawa Senators	82	37	41	4	25	255	281	−26	78
9	AT	Montreal Canadiens	82	30	36	16	20	236	289	−53	76
10	ME	Columbus Blue Jackets	82	27	43	12	21	237	300	−63	66

Source: National Hockey League
Rules for classification: 1) Fewer number of games played (GP, only during regular season); 2) Greater number of regulation wins (RW); 3) Greater number of wins in regulation and overtime, excluding shootout wins (ROW); 4) Greater number of total wins, including shootouts (W); 5) Greater number of points earned in head-to-head play; if teams played an uneven number of head-to-head games, the result of the first game on the home ice of the team with the extra home game is discarded; 6) Greater goal differential (GD); 7) Greater number of goals scored (GF)
x – Clinched playoff spot

== Schedule and results ==
=== Preseason ===
The pre-season schedule was published on June 23, 2023.

2023 preseason game log: 6–2–0 (home: 3–1–0; road: 3–1–0)
#	Date	Visitor	Score	Home	OT	Decision	Attendance	Record	Recap
1	September 24	Toronto	2–3	Ottawa		Forsberg	15,013	1–0–0
2	September 25	Ottawa	4–3	Toronto	OT	Sogaard	14,296	2–0–0
3	September 27	Ottawa	3–4	Montreal		Korpisalo	20,225	2–1–0
4	September 29	Winnipeg	1–3	Ottawa		Mandolese	12,276	3–1–0
5	October 1	Florida	2–4	Ottawa		Forsberg	4,926	4–1–0
6	October 2	Ottawa	3–0	Pittsburgh		Korpisalo	10,595	5–1–0
7	October 5	Ottawa	3–0	Winnipeg		Forsberg	13,601	6–1–0
8	October 7	Montreal	6–4	Ottawa		Sogaard	17,601	6–2–0

=== Regular season ===
The Ottawa Senators regular season schedule was released on June 27, 2023.

2023–24 game log

October: 4–4–0 (home: 3–2–0; road: 1–2–0)
#	Date	Visitor	Score	Home	OT	Decision	Attendance	Record	Pts	Recap
1	October 11	Ottawa	3–5	Carolina		Korpisalo	18,893	0–1–0	0
2	October 14	Philadelphia	2–5	Ottawa		Forsberg	20,011	1–1–0	2
3	October 15	Tampa Bay	2–5	Ottawa		Korpisalo	15,584	2–1–0	4
4	October 18	Washington	1–6	Ottawa		Forsberg	15,021	3–1–0	6
5	October 21	Detroit	5–2	Ottawa		Korpisalo	18,834	3–2–0	6
6	October 24	Buffalo	6–4	Ottawa		Forsberg	14,278	3–3–0	6
7	October 26	Ottawa	2–3	NY Islanders		Korpisalo	14,911	3–4–0	6
8	October 28	Ottawa	5–2	Pittsburgh		Korpisalo	17,631	4–4–0	8

November: 4–5–0 (home: 3–5–0; road: 1–0–0)
#	Date	Visitor	Score	Home	OT	Decision	Attendance	Record	Pts	Recap
9	November 2	Los Angeles	3–2	Ottawa		Korpisalo	16,216	4–5–0	8
10	November 4	Tampa Bay	6–4	Ottawa		Korpisalo	17,387	4–6–0	8
11	November 8	Ottawa	6–3	Toronto		Korpisalo	18,372	5–6–0	10
12	November 9	Vancouver	5–2	Ottawa		Forsberg	16,653	5–7–0	10
13	November 11	Calgary	1–4	Ottawa		Korpisalo	18,874	6–7–0	12
14	November 16^{[a]}	Detroit	4–5	Ottawa	OT	Korpisalo	12,487	7–7–0	14
15	November 18^{[a]}	Minnesota	1–2	Ottawa	SO	Forsberg	13,213	8–7–0	16
16	November 24	NY Islanders	5–3	Ottawa		Forsberg	17,693	8–8–0	16
17	November 27	Florida	5–0	Ottawa		Korpisalo	15,594	8–9–0	16

December: 6–9–0 (home: 4–3–0; road: 2–6–0)
#	Date	Visitor	Score	Home	OT	Decision	Attendance	Record	Pts	Recap
18	December 1	Ottawa	2–4	Columbus		Korpisalo	15,552	8–10–0	16
19	December 2	Seattle	0–2	Ottawa		Forsberg	18,159	9–10–0	18
20	December 5	NY Rangers	2–6	Ottawa		Forsberg	17,362	10–10–0	20
21	December 7	Toronto	4–3	Ottawa		Forsberg	19,309	10–11–0	20
22	December 9	Ottawa	5–1	Detroit		Korpisalo	19,515	11–11–0	22
23	December 12	Carolina	4–1	Ottawa		Korpisalo	16,877	11–12–0	22
24	December 14	Ottawa	2–4	St. Louis		Korpisalo	18,096	11–13–0	22
25	December 15	Ottawa	4–5	Dallas		Forsberg	18,532	11–14–0	22
26	December 17	Ottawa	3–6	Vegas		Korpisalo	17,892	11–15–0	22
27	December 19	Ottawa	3–4	Arizona		Korpisalo	4,600	11–16–0	22
28	December 21	Ottawa	4–6	Colorado		Korpisalo	18,107	11–17–0	22
29	December 23	Pittsburgh	4–5	Ottawa	OT	Forsberg	19,286	12–17–0	24
30	December 27	Ottawa	4–2	Toronto		Korpisalo	19,261	13–17–0	26
31	December 29	New Jersey	6–2	Ottawa		Korpisalo	20,022	13–18–0	26
32	December 31	Buffalo	1–5	Ottawa		Forsberg	19,421	14–18–0	28

January: 6–7–2 (home: 3–2–2; road: 3–5–0)
#	Date	Visitor	Score	Home	OT	Decision	Attendance	Record	Pts	Recap
33	January 2	Ottawa	3–6	Vancouver		Forsberg	18,810	14–19–0	28
34	January 4	Ottawa	1–4	Seattle		Korpisalo	17,151	14–20–0	28
35	January 6	Ottawa	1–3	Edmonton		Forsberg	18,347	14–21–0	28
36	January 9	Ottawa	3–6	Calgary		Korpisalo	17,219	14–22–0	28
37	January 11	Ottawa	3–5	Buffalo		Korpisalo	16,083	14–23–0	28
38	January 13	San Jose	4–5	Ottawa		Korpisalo	18,764	15–23–0	30
39	January 16	Colorado	7–4	Ottawa		Sogaard	16,242	15–24–0	30
40	January 18	Montreal	2–6	Ottawa		Korpisalo	19,286	16–24–0	32
41	January 20	Winnipeg	2–1	Ottawa	OT	Korpisalo	19,388	16–24–1	33
42	January 21	Ottawa	5–3	Philadelphia		Sogaard	18,930	17–24–1	35
43	January 23	Ottawa	4–1	Montreal		Korpisalo	21,105	18–24–1	37
44	January 25	Boston	3–2	Ottawa	OT	Korpisalo	18,722	18–24–2	38
45	January 27	NY Rangers	7–2	Ottawa		Korpisalo	19,262	18–25–2	38
46	January 29	Nashville	3–4	Ottawa	OT	Korpisalo	16,284	19–25–2	40
47	January 31	Ottawa	3–2	Detroit	OT	Korpisalo	19,515	20–25–2	42

February: 5–4–1 (home: 4–1–0; road: 1–3–1)
#	Date	Visitor	Score	Home	OT	Decision	Attendance	Record	Pts	Recap
48	February 10	Toronto	3–5	Ottawa		Korpisalo	19,679	21–25–2	44
49	February 13	Columbus	3–6	Ottawa		Forsberg	15,203	22–25–2	46
50	February 15	Anaheim	5–1	Ottawa		Korpisalo	16,297	22–26–2	46
51	February 17	Ottawa	2–3	Chicago		Korpisalo	18,888	22–27–2	46
52	February 19	Ottawa	4–2	Tampa Bay		Forsberg	19,092	23–27–2	48
53	February 20	Ottawa	2–3	Florida	OT	Korpisalo	19,000	23–27–3	49
54	February 22	Dallas	1–4	Ottawa		Forsberg	16,118	24–27–3	51
55	February 24	Vegas	3–4	Ottawa	SO	Forsberg	19,197	25–27–3	53
56	February 26	Ottawa	3–6	Washington		Forsberg	17,296	25–28–3	53
57	February 27	Ottawa	1–4	Nashville		Korpisalo	17,159	25–29–3	53

March: 8–7–1 (home: 3–3–0; road: 5–4–1)
#	Date	Visitor	Score	Home	OT	Decision	Attendance	Record	Pts	Recap
58	March 1	Arizona	5–3	Ottawa		Forsberg	17,734	25–30–3	53
59	March 2	Ottawa	2–4	Philadelphia		Sogaard	18,971	25–31–3	53
60	March 6	Ottawa	1–2	Anaheim		Sogaard	14,000	25–32–3	53
61	March 7	Ottawa	3–4	Los Angeles	OT	Korpisalo	16,855	25–32–4	54
62	March 9	Ottawa	1–2	San Jose		Korpisalo	17,008	25–33–4	54
63	March 12	Pittsburgh	1–2	Ottawa	OT	Korpisalo	19,296	26–33–4	56
64	March 14	Ottawa	3–2	Columbus	SO	Forsberg	15,667	27–33–4	58
65	March 16	Ottawa	4–3	NY Islanders	OT	Korpisalo	17,255	28–33–4	60
66	March 17	Carolina	7–2	Ottawa		Forsberg	16,273	28–34–4	60
67	March 19	Ottawa	2–6	Boston		Korpisalo	17,850	28–35–4	60
68	March 21	St. Louis	5–2	Ottawa		Forsberg	16,040	28–36–4	60
69	March 23	Ottawa	5–2	New Jersey		Korpisalo	16,514	29–36–4	62
70	March 24	Edmonton	3–5	Ottawa		Korpisalo	19,344	30–36–4	64
71	March 27	Ottawa	6–2	Buffalo		Korpisalo	14,583	31–36–4	66
72	March 28	Chicago	0–2	Ottawa		Forsberg	19,292	32–36–4	68
73	March 30	Ottawa	3–2	Winnipeg		Korpisalo	15,225	33–36–4	70

April: 4–5–0 (home: 1–2–0; road: 3–3–0)
#	Date	Visitor	Score	Home	OT	Decision	Attendance	Record	Pts	Recap
74	April 2	Ottawa	2–3	Minnesota		Korpisalo	18,056	33–37–4	70
75	April 4	Florida	6–0	Ottawa		Korpisalo	17,653	33–38–4	70
76	April 6	New Jersey	4–3	Ottawa		Korpisalo	19,146	33–39–4	70
77	April 7	Ottawa	3–2	Washington	OT	Korpisalo	17,902	34–39–4	72
78	April 9	Ottawa	0–2	Florida		Korpisalo	17,872	34–40–4	72
79	April 11	Ottawa	3–2	Tampa Bay	SO	Forsberg	19,092	35–40–4	74
80	April 13	Montreal	4–5	Ottawa	SO	Korpisalo	19,337	36–40–4	76
81	April 15	Ottawa	0–4	NY Rangers		Korpisalo	18,006	36–41–4	76
82	April 16	Ottawa	3–1	Boston		Forsberg	17,850	37–41–4	78

Legend: Win (2 points) Loss (0 points) Overtime/shootout loss (1 point)
Notes:
^{a} Game was played at Avicii Arena in Stockholm, Sweden.

== Player statistics ==
Final statistics

=== Skaters ===
Regular season
Player	GP	G	A	Pts	+/−	PIM
Brady Tkachuk	81	37	37	74	+1	134
Tim Stutzle	75	18	52	70	−17	28
Drake Batherson	82	28	38	66	−9	42
Claude Giroux	82	21	43	64	−14	26
Vladimir Tarasenko^{‡}	57	17	24	41	+13	12
Jakob Chychrun	82	14	27	41	−30	60
Jake Sanderson	79	10	28	38	+8	23
Mathieu Joseph	72	11	24	35	−4	51
Josh Norris	50	16	14	30	−6	22
Thomas Chabot	51	9	21	30	−3	22
Shane Pinto	41	9	18	27	+9	14
Ridly Greig	72	13	13	26	+11	66
Artyom Zub	69	5	20	25	+5	32
Erik Brannstrom	76	3	17	20	+5	36
Parker Kelly	80	8	10	18	−8	30
Dominik Kubalik	74	11	4	15	−30	19
Jacob Bernard-Docker	72	4	10	14	−7	25
Mark Kastelic	63	5	5	10	−5	63
Travis Hamonic	48	2	4	6	−10	40
Boris Katchouk^{†}	21	2	2	4	−4	0
Rourke Chartier	37	2	1	3	−4	14
Zack MacEwen	30	2	1	3	−4	57
Angus Crookshank	13	2	1	3	−3	4
Jiri Smejkal	20	1	1	2	−6	4
Matthew Highmore	7	0	2	2	0	0
Roby Jarventie	7	0	1	1	−5	4
Tyler Kleven	9	0	1	1	−1	2
Maxence Guenette	7	0	0	0	−1	2
Zack Ostapchuk	7	0	0	0	−1	0
Bokondji Imama	6	0	0	0	+1	7
Nikolas Matinpalo	4	0	0	0	+1	0

=== Goaltenders ===
Regular season
Player	GP	GS	TOI	W	L	OT	GA	GAA	SA	SV%	SO	G	A	PIM
Joonas Korpisalo	55	49	3080:28	21	26	4	168	3.27	1522	.890	0	0	1	0
Anton Forsberg	30	28	1569:09	15	12	0	84	3.21	766	.890	2	0	1	2
Mads Sogaard	6	5	281:34	1	3	0	19	4.05	135	.859	0	0	0	0

^{†}Denotes player spent time with another team before joining the Senators. Stats reflect time with the Senators only.
^{‡}No longer with the Senators.

== Awards and milestones ==
=== Milestones ===
Player	Milestone	Date	Ref.
Parker Kelly	100th NHL game	October 15, 2023	
Drake Batherson	100th NHL assist	October 24, 2023	
Travis Hamonic	800th NHL game	October 26, 2023	
Rourke Chartier	1st NHL assist	October 26, 2023	
Nikolas Matinpalo	1st NHL game	October 28, 2023	
Roby Jarventie	1st NHL game	November 4, 2023	
Josh Norris	100th NHL point	November 4, 2023	
Roby Jarventie	1st NHL assist 1st NHL point	November 8, 2023	
Mathieu Joseph	300th NHL game	November 9, 2023	
Jakob Chychrun	400th NHL game	November 18, 2023	
Erik Brannstrom	200th NHL game	November 18, 2023	
Dominik Kubalik	300th NHL game	November 27, 2023	
Tim Stutzle	200th NHL point	December 2, 2023	
Jacob Bernard-Docker	1st NHL goal	December 7, 2023	
Jiri Smejkal	1st NHL game	December 9, 2023	
Joonas Korpisalo	100th NHL win	December 9, 2023	
Jake Sanderson	100th NHL game	December 12, 2023	
Artem Zub	200th NHL game	December 17, 2023	
Angus Crookshank	1st NHL game	December 17, 2023	
Vladimir Tarasenko	700th NHL game	December 19, 2023	
Angus Crookshank	1st NHL goal 1st NHL point	December 19, 2023	
Jiri Smejkal	1st NHL assist 1st NHL point	December 21, 2023	
Brady Tkachuk	300th NHL point	December 27, 2023	
Angus Crookshank	1st NHL assist	December 29, 2023	
Jakob Chychrun	200th NHL point	December 31, 2023	
Mark Kastelic	100th NHL game	January 2, 2024	
Zack MacEwen	200th NHL game	January 2, 2024	
Vladimir Tarasenko	600th NHL point	January 11, 2024	
Thomas Chabot	400th NHL game	January 20, 2024	
Brady Tkachuk	400th NHL game	January 20, 2024	
Shane Pinto	100th NHL game	January 21, 2024	
Claude Giroux	700th NHL assist	January 27, 2024	
Drake Batherson	200th NHL point	February 22, 2024	
Zack Ostapchuk	1st NHL game	March 12, 2024	
Drake Batherson	300th NHL game	March 30, 2024	
Jacob Bernard-Docker	100th NHL game	April 9, 2024	
Jiri Smejkal	1st NHL goal	April 16, 2024	

== Transactions ==
The Senators have been involved in the following transactions during the 2023–24 season.

=== Trades ===
Date	Details		Ref
July 9, 2023	To Detroit Red Wings Alex DeBrincat	To Ottawa Senators Dominik Kubalik; Donovan Sebrango; Conditional 1st-round pick in 2024^{1} 4th-round pick in 2024	
March 6, 2024	To Florida Panthers Vladimir Tarasenko	To Ottawa Senators Conditional 4th-round pick in 2024^{2} 3rd-round pick in 2025	
March 15, 2024	To Winnipeg Jets Future considerations	To Ottawa Senators Wyatt Bongiovanni	
March 15, 2024	To Carolina Hurricanes 6th-round pick in 2024	To Ottawa Senators Jamieson Rees	
June 24, 2024	To Boston Bruins Mark Kastelic; Joonas Korpisalo; 1st-round pick in 2024^{3}	To Ottawa Senators Linus Ullmark	

==== Notes ====
1. The Ottawa Senators will receive either the 2024 first-round pick of the Boston Bruins or the Detroit Red Wings. However, if the Bruins' pick is in the top ten, the Bruins will send their 2025 first-round draft pick. The Red Wings will then have the choice of sending Detroit's 2024 1st-round pick or the Bruins' 2025 1st-round pick.
2. The fourth-round pick in 2024 became a 2026 third-round pick after the Florida Panthers won the 2024 Stanley Cup.
3. The first-round pick the Ottawa Senators traded to the Boston Bruins was Boston's pick from the Alex DeBrincat trade.

=== Players acquired ===
Date	Player	Former team	Term	Via	Ref
July 1, 2023	Josh Currie	Metallurg Magnitogorsk (KHL)	1-year	Free agency	
July 1, 2023	Matthew Highmore	St. Louis Blues	1-year	Free agency	
July 1, 2023	Bokondji Imama	Arizona Coyotes	1-year	Free agency	
July 1, 2023	Joonas Korpisalo	Los Angeles Kings	5-year	Free agency	
July 1, 2023	Garrett Pilon	Washington Capitals	1-year	Free agency	
July 6, 2023	Zack MacEwen	Los Angeles Kings	3-year	Free agency	
July 27, 2023	Vladimir Tarasenko	New York Rangers	1-year	Free agency	
October 9, 2023	Lassi Thomson	Anaheim Ducks		Waivers	
March 8, 2024	Boris Katchouk	Chicago Blackhawks		Waivers	

=== Players lost ===
Date	Player	New team	Term	Via	Ref
July 1, 2023	Patrick Brown	Boston Bruins	2-year	Free agency	
July 1, 2023	Jake Lucchini	Minnesota Wild	1-year	Free agency	
July 1, 2023	Cam Talbot	Los Angeles Kings	1-year	Free agency	
July 2, 2023	Scott Sabourin	San Jose Sharks	2-year	Free agency	
July 3, 2023	Dylan Gambrell	Toronto Maple Leafs	1-year	Free agency	
July 5, 2023	Julien Gauthier	New York Islanders	2-year	Free agency	
July 23, 2023	Antoine Bibeau	AIK IF (HA)	1-year	Free agency	
July 28, 2023	Dylan Ferguson	Dinamo Minsk (KHL)	N/A	Free agency	
September 12, 2023	Nick Holden			Retirement	
October 1, 2023	Lassi Thomson	Anaheim Ducks		Waivers	
October 9, 2023	Austin Watson	Tampa Bay Lightning	1-year	Free agency	
May 13, 2024	Lassi Thomson	Malmö Redhawks (SHL)	2-year‡	Free agency	
May 31, 2024	Jacob Larsson	SC Rapperswil-Jona Lakers (NL)	2-year‡	Free agency	
June 13, 2024	Jiri Smejkal	HC Dynamo Pardubice (ELH)	5-year‡	Free agency	

=== Player signings ===
Date	Player	Term	Ref
July 1, 2023	Jacob Bernard-Docker	2-year	
July 1, 2023	Erik Brannstrom	1-year	
July 1, 2023	Rourke Chartier	1-year	
July 4, 2023	Travis Hamonic	2-year	
July 11, 2023	Kevin Mandolese	1-year	
September 6, 2023	Jake Sanderson	8-year‡	
September 19, 2023	Egor Sokolov	1-year	
September 21, 2023	Djibril Toure	3-year†	
January 19, 2024	Shane Pinto	1-year	
March 22, 2024	Stephen Halliday	2-year†‡	
June 12, 2024	Angus Crookshank	1-year‡	
June 14, 2024	Cole Reinhardt	1-year‡	
June 18, 2024	Maxence Guenette	1-year‡	
June 20, 2024	Nikolas Matinpalo	1-year‡	
June 21, 2024	Jamieson Rees	1-year‡	
June 25, 2024	Wyatt Bongiovanni	1-year‡	
June 27, 2024	Matthew Highmore	1-year‡	

==== Key ====
† Contract is entry-level.
‡ Contract takes effect in the 2024–25 season.

== Draft picks ==
The 2023 NHL entry draft was held June 28–29, 2023 in Nashville, Tennessee, USA. The Senators had previously traded their first-round, second-round, third-round and sixth-round picks. The Senators' first pick was made in the fourth round - defenceman Hoyt Stanley with the 108th overall pick.

Round	Overall	Player	Position	Nationality	Club team
4	108	Hoyt Stanley	D	Canada	Victoria Grizzlies (BCHL)
5	140	Matthew Andonovski	D	Canada	Kitchener Rangers (OHL)
7	204	Owen Beckner	C	Canada	Salmon Arm Silverbacks (BCHL)
7	207	Vladimir Nikitin	G	Kazakhstan	Snezhnye Barsy (PHL)
7	215	Nicholas Vantassell	C	United States	Green Bay Gamblers (USHL)
