= Zack MacEwen =

Canadian ice hockey player (born 1996)

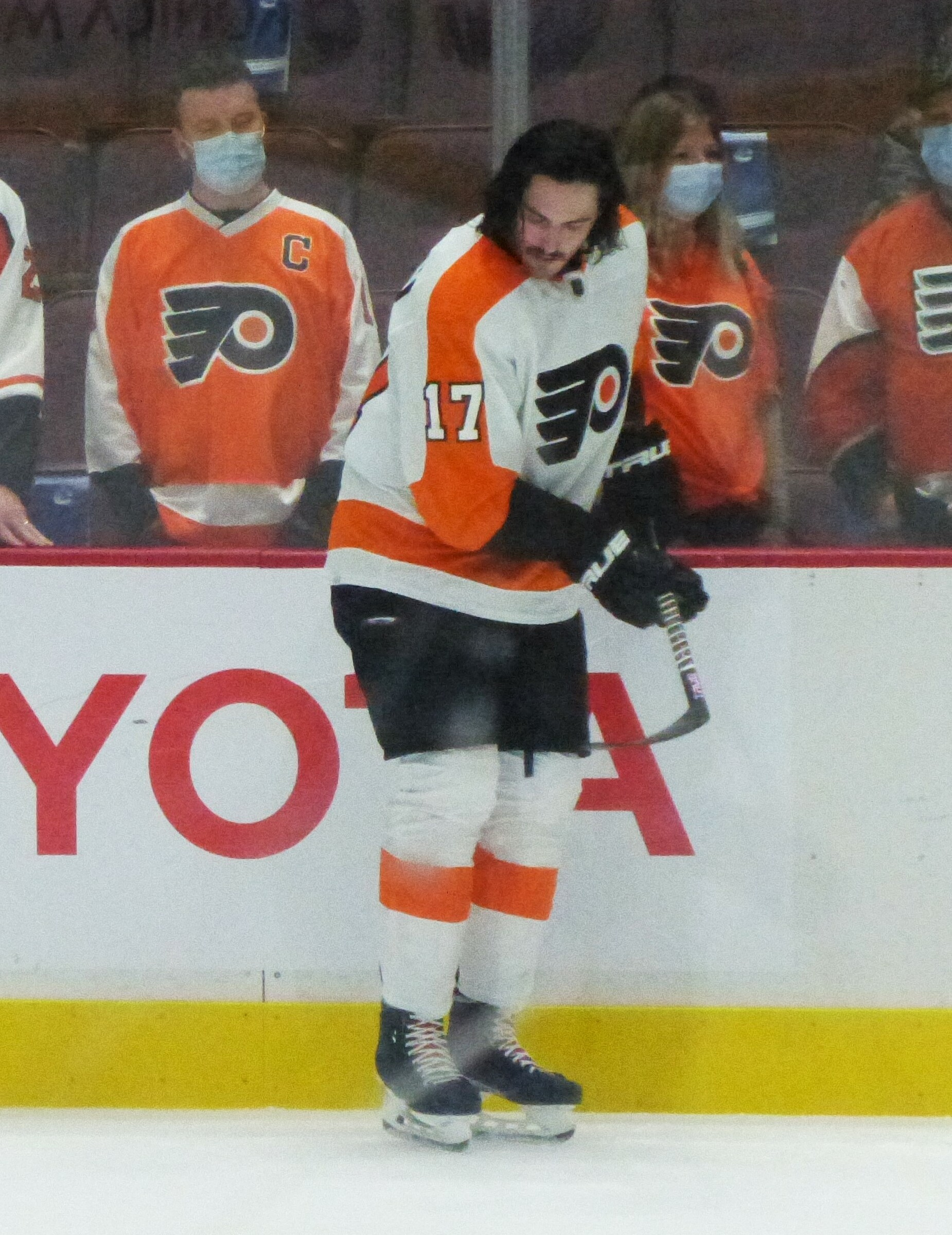
- MacEwen with the Philadelphia Flyers in 2021
- Born: July 8, 1996 (age 30) Charlottetown, Prince Edward Island, Canada
- Height: 6 ft 3 in (191 cm)
- Weight: 227 lb (103 kg; 16 st 3 lb)
- Position: Forward
- Shoots: Right
- NHL team Former teams: Toronto Maple Leafs; Vancouver Canucks; Philadelphia Flyers; Los Angeles Kings; Ottawa Senators; New Jersey Devils
- NHL draft: Undrafted
- Playing career: 2017–present

Zack MacEwen (born July 8, 1996) is a Canadian professional ice hockey player who is a forward for the Toronto Maple Leafs of the National Hockey League (NHL). He previously played for the Vancouver Canucks, Philadelphia Flyers, Los Angeles Kings, Ottawa Senators, and the New Jersey Devils.

== Playing career ==
=== Amateur ===
MacEwen was selected 45th overall in the fifth round of the 2013 Maritime Junior Hockey League by the Amherst Ramblers. He played two seasons with the Ramblers, breaking out in his second season with 29 goals and 52 points in 46 games. During the 2014–15 season season, he signed as a free agent with the Moncton Wildcats of the Quebec Major Junior Hockey League (QMJHL), briefly filling in for various skaters who were attending that year's World Junior Championship. However, he returned to Amherst to finish the season. In nine games played with Moncton, he scored one goal and one assist for two points. Once the Ramblers season ended, MacEwen returned to Moncton for their playoff run. He did not play in the Wildcats' first round series, but appeared in the following two as the Wildcats advanced to the semifinals before losing to the Quebec Remparts. In nine playoff appearances, he scored two goals and four points. He rejoined Moncton for the 2015–16 season, scoring ten goals and 30 assists in 66 games. Moncton once again made the playoffs and advanced to the semifinals where they were eliminated by the Rouyn-Noranda Huskies. In 17 playoff games, he recorded four goals and eight points.

On August 12, 2016, the Wildcats traded MacEwen to the Gatineau Olympiques in exchange for a fifth-round selection in the 2017 QMJHL entry draft. Although Moncton had expressed interest in retaining him for the 2016–17 season, the league only allowed three 20-year-old players per team. With the Olympiques he delivered his best season in major junior, marking 31 goals and 74 points in 66 games. The Olympiques qualified for the playoffs but were knocked out in the first round by the Cape Breton Screaming Eagles. In seven playoff games, he scored six goals and nine points.

=== Professional ===
==== Vancouver Canucks (2017–2021) ====
MacEwen, having gone undrafted in the National Hockey League (NHL) entry draft attended the Anaheim Ducks prospect camp, but went unsigned. Other teams interested in signing MacEwen included the Tampa Bay Lightning, Dallas Stars, and Toronto Maple Leafs. Ultimately, on March 3, 2017, he signed a three-year entry-level contract with the Vancouver Canucks. He later signed an amateur tryout contract with the Canucks American Hockey League (AHL) affiliate, the Utica Comets, on April 10, but did not appear for the team that season. He was assigned to the Comets to begin the 2017–18 season. He scored his first career AHL goal on October 29, against the Charlotte Checkers and ended his first professional season with ten goals and 33 points in 66 games. He was awarded the Ian Anderson Award as the Comets' Most Improved rookie. The Comets made the 2018 Calder Cup playoffs and faced the Toronto Marlies in the opening round, which the Comets ultimately lost, but not before pushing the eventual Calder Cup champions to the brink of elimination. In five playoff appearances, MacEwen scored one goal.

After attending the Canucks training camp, MacEwen was assigned to the Comets to begin the 2018–19 season in the AHL. He was recalled from the AHL on February 10, 2019, after a four-point game the previous night against the Rochester Americans. He subsequently made his NHL debut on February 11, against the San Jose Sharks. He recorded his first NHL point in his debut with an assist on Derrick Pouliot's goal. However, the Canucks lost 7–2. MacEwen played four games, recording the one assist. He was returned to Utica where he finished the season tallying 22 goals and 52 points in 69 games as the team missed the playoffs. After spending the first 13 games of the 2019–20 season with the Comets, MacEwen and Tyler Graovac were recalled to the NHL on November 13, with Jalen Chatfield sent down to the AHL in their place. He scored his first NHL goal on December 3 in the first period of a 5–2 victory over the Ottawa Senators. MacEwen was briefly reassigned to Utica when Michael Ferland was activated from concussion protocols, but was called back up four days later when Ferland suffered an additional upper-body injury. After the arrival of Tyler Toffoli sent MacEwen back to Utica, he was recalled once more on January 30, 2020, when MacEwen and Justin Bailey were called up in place of an injured Tyler Motte. The NHL season was suspended on March 12 due to the COVID-19 pandemic. In 17 games with the Canucks, he recorded five goals and six points. In 20 games with Utica, five goals and 11 points. He also joined Vancouver for the pandemic-delayed 2020 Stanley Cup playoffs, appearing in six games for a team that defeated the defending champion St. Louis Blues before losing in the second round to the Vegas Golden Knights.

With the NHL instituting a strict salary cap for the 2020–21 season, Vancouver general manager Jim Benning began looking at MacEwen as an inexpensive everyday NHL player by February 2020. MacEwen signed a two-year contract extension with Vancouver on October 6, 2020, a deal with an average annual value of $825,000. He had difficulty settling into the 2020–21 season, as several injuries and an outbreak of COVID-19 among players and staff led to a constant rotation of skaters on the fourth line. MacEwan himself only skated in 34 of 56 games in the pandemic-shortened season, notching two points in the process. He was also one of 21 members of the Canucks organization to contract COVID-19, missing two weeks in April with the virus. After being initially asymptomatic, MacEwen suffered from an "uncomfortable tiredness" for a short period of time. MacEwen was also suspended for one game in May for a series of hits on Darnell Nurse of the Edmonton Oilers. While he originally received a minor penalty for high-sticking Nurse after a collision, MacEwan was suspended and fined $7,000 for kneeing a prone Nurse in the head. Neither player left the game, and they fought twice more, once in the second and once in the third period.

==== Philadelphia Flyers (2021–2023) ====
On October 12, 2021, shortly before the start of the 2021–22 NHL season, the Canucks placed MacEwen on waivers in order to make room for Alex Chiasson, who was being signed to a one-year contract. The Philadelphia Flyers, who were short a forward after an injury to Kevin Hayes, claimed MacEwen off of waivers the next day. After successfully acquiring his US work visa, MacEwen joined the Flyers on October 20, skating on the fourth line alongside Nate Thompson and former QMJHL teammate Nicolas Aubé-Kubel. In 75 games that season, MacEwen racked up three goals and a career-high nine points.

As a restricted free agent in the off-season, MacEwen was re-signed to a one-year, $925,000 contract extension with the Flyers on August 2, 2022. On October 10, he was assigned to Philadelphia's AHL affiliate, the Lehigh Valley Phantoms. After appearing two games with Lehigh Valley in which he scored one goal and three points, he was recalled on October 17. Under new coach John Tortorella, MacEwen played effectively on the fourth line alongside Nicolas Deslauriers and Patrick Brown. On January 29, 2023, MacEwen suffered a broken jaw in a fight with the Minnesota Wild's Marcus Foligno. He had already tied his career-high in points with nine in a season before his injury. He was expected to miss five weeks.

==== Los Angeles Kings (2023) ====
On March 3, 2023, the Flyers traded MacEwen to the Los Angeles Kings in exchange for Brendan Lemieux and a fifth-round pick in the 2024 NHL entry draft. He played his first game with Los Angeles in a 4–2 win over the Washington Capitals. He registered his first point with the Kings on March 20, assisting on Carl Grundström's goal in an 8–2 victory over the Calgary Flames, setting a new career-high in single season points. He finished the season with a combined four goals and 10 points in 57 games and appeared in one post-season game with the Kings versus the Edmonton Oilers.

==== Ottawa Senators (2023–2025) ====
On July 6, 2023, MacEwen as an unrestricted free agent was signed to a three-year, $2.325 million contract with the Ottawa Senators. He made the team out of training camp, but after four games, MacEwen was placed on waivers due to salary cap implications. After going unclaimed, he was assigned to Ottawa's AHL affiliate, the Belleville Senators. He was recalled by Ottawa on November 4 after Ridly Greig and Mark Kastelic suffered injuries. MacEwen was fined by the NHL on November 28 for unsportsmanlike conduct after an altercation with Matthew Tkachuk of the Florida Panthers during the Senators 5–0 loss on November 27. MacEwen scored his first goal with the Senators on December 31 in a 5–1 over the Buffalo Sabres. On February 12, 2024, MacEwen was placed on waivers again by the Senators in order to make room on the roster for Anton Forsberg who was returning from injury. After going unclaimed, he was assigned to Belleville. He was recalled on March 1 after Josh Norris suffered a season-ending injury and Brady Tkachuk suffered an upper-body injury. However, in his first game back with the team on March 2, he suffered a lower body injury in the first period and did not return. He returned to the lineup on April 7 versus the Washington Capitals.

He began the 2024–25 season with Ottawa and recorded a two-goal game in an 8–7 overtime victory over the Los Angeles Kings on October 14. He played in 19 games with Ottawa, scoring two goals and five points before being placed on waivers on November 24. He cleared waivers on November 25 and was assigned to Belleville. He was recalled by Ottawa on January 10, 2025, and appeared in two more games with the team before being returned to Belleville on January 16. MacEwen took an indefinite leave of absence from the organization for personal reasons on January 21. He finished the season having appeared in 21 games for Ottawa, recording two goals and three points, and 23 games for Belleville, scoring seven goals and 16 points.

==== New Jersey Devils (2025–2026) ====
On October 3, 2025, ahead of the 2025–26 season, MacEwen was traded to the New Jersey Devils in exchange for Kurtis MacDermid. On October 4, the Devils placed him on waivers, but he went unclaimed. He made his debut for New Jersey on October 11, but was injured in the game and missed a month. He returned to the lineup on November 10, but on November 12, he was injured again and placed on injured reserve. The injury, which required surgery on his anterior cruciate ligament to repair, kept him out for the remainder of the season.

==== Toronto Maple Leafs (2026–present) ====
On July 1, 2026, MacEwen signed a two-year, $1.75 million contract with the Toronto Maple Leafs.

== Personal life ==
MacEwen is of Scottish descent from his paternal great-grandmother. While being raised in Stratford, Prince Edward Island by parents Craig and Juliana, his family ran a berry farm. On May 6, 2020, it was announced that his father Craig had died.

== Career statistics ==
			Regular season					Playoffs
Season	Team	League	GP	G	A	Pts	PIM	GP	G	A	Pts	PIM
2014–15	Moncton Wildcats	QMJHL	9	1	1	2	6	9	2	2	4	10
2015–16	Moncton Wildcats	QMJHL	66	10	30	40	56	17	4	4	8	14
2016–17	Gatineau Olympiques	QMJHL	66	31	43	74	90	7	6	3	9	2
2017–18	Utica Comets	AHL	66	10	23	33	56	5	1	0	1	4
2018–19	Utica Comets	AHL	69	22	30	52	75	—	—	—	—	—
2018–19	Vancouver Canucks	NHL	4	0	1	1	5	—	—	—	—	—
2019–20	Utica Comets	AHL	20	5	6	11	25	—	—	—	—	—
2019–20	Vancouver Canucks	NHL	17	5	1	6	20	6	0	0	0	9
2020–21	Vancouver Canucks	NHL	34	1	1	2	44	—	—	—	—	—
2021–22	Philadelphia Flyers	NHL	75	3	6	9	110	—	—	—	—	—
2022–23	Lehigh Valley Phantoms	AHL	2	1	2	3	0	—	—	—	—	—
2022–23	Philadelphia Flyers	NHL	46	4	5	9	54	—	—	—	—	—
2022–23	Los Angeles Kings	NHL	10	0	1	1	12	1	0	0	0	2
2023–24	Ottawa Senators	NHL	30	2	1	3	57	—	—	—	—	—
2023–24	Belleville Senators	AHL	10	5	2	7	8	—	—	—	—	—
2024–25	Ottawa Senators	NHL	21	2	1	3	21	—	—	—	—	—
2024–25	Belleville Senators	AHL	23	7	9	16	29	—	—	—	—	—
2025–26	New Jersey Devils	NHL	3	0	0	0	0	—	—	—	—	—
NHL totals			240	17	17	34	323	7	0	0	0	11
