= Jiří Smejkal =

Czech ice hockey forward (born 1996)

- Born: 5 November 1996 (age 30) České Budějovice, Czech Republic
- Height: 6 ft 3 in (191 cm)
- Weight: 203 lb (92 kg; 14 st 7 lb)
- Position: Forward
- Shoots: Left
- ELH team Former teams: HC Dynamo Pardubice; Medveščak Zagreb; Sparta Praha; Piráti Chomutov; Tappara; Lahti Pelicans; IK Oskarshamn; Ottawa Senators
- National team: Czech Republic
- NHL draft: Undrafted
- Playing career: 2016–present

Jiří Smejkal (born 5 November 1996) is a Czech professional ice hockey forward for HC Dynamo Pardubice of the Czech Extraliga. He has previously played in the National Hockey League for the Ottawa Senators and in several European leagues.

== Playing career ==
Smejkal started his career in the youth setup at ČEZ Motor České Budějovice. He was picked by Medveščak Zagreb of the Kontinental Hockey League (KHL) in the 2013 KHL draft. In 2014, he headed over the Atlantic to hone his skills in the Western Hockey League (WHL), joining the Moose Jaw Warriors. In his first year with the Warriors, Smejkal made 72 WHL appearances, tallying 12 goals and 20 assists. He also started the 2015–16 season playing for the team but was traded to fellow WHL side Kamloops Blazers in January 2016.

On 15 July 2016, Smejkal signed with Medveščak Zagreb of the KHL. He left for Sparta Praha on 31 January 2017. On 27 December, Smejkal was loaned to Piráti Chomutov for the remainder of the 2017–18 season.

After the conclusion of Smejkal's contract with Sparta Praha, he moved to Finland and signed one-year contracts with Tappara in May 2020, and then with Lahti Pelicans in July 2021.

Smejkal spent the 2022–23 season with IK Oskarshamn of the Swedish Hockey League (SHL). He placed third in team scoring with 23 goals and 43 points in 49 games.

As an undrafted free agent, Smejkal signed a one-year, entry-level contract with the Ottawa Senators of the National Hockey League (NHL) on 4 May 2023. The signing came in response to the Senators' stated goal of bolstering its scoring and organizational depth ahead of a 2023–24 season in which they hoped to make the Stanley Cup playoffs for the first time since 2017. Described as a "prototypical power forward", it was hoped that Smejkal's combination of size and skill would help the team achieve that goal. Smejkal was assigned to Ottawa's American Hockey League (AHL) affiliate, the Belleville Senators, to start the 2023–24 season. On 9 December, Smejkal made his NHL debut in a 5–1 win over the Detroit Red Wings. He played in two games with Ottawa before being returned to Belleville. He was recalled again, along with Angus Crookshank, on 16 December after injuries to Mathieu Joseph and Rourke Chartier. On 22 December, Smejkal collected his first NHL point, assisting on Jacob Bernard-Docker's goal in a 6–4 loss to the Colorado Avalanche. He played in seven games before being sent back to Belleville on 7 January 2024. He was recalled again on 7 March. However, his stay in the NHL was short, being returned to the AHL after Parker Kelly returned from suspension on 13 March. Smejkal finished his AHL season on 4 April, recording nine goals and 22 points in 46 games with Belleville. He was recalled that day due to an injury to Crookshank and remained with Ottawa until the end of the season. In the final game of the season on 16 April, Smejkal recorded his first NHL goal against Linus Ullmark in 3–1 win over the Boston Bruins.

On 13 June 2024, Smejkal signed a five-year contract with HC Dynamo Pardubice of the Czech Extraliga.

== International play ==
Medal record

Representing Czech Republic

World Championships
Bronze medal – third place	2022 Finland	

Smejkal has represented Czech national teams on several occasions, including the 2014 IIHF World U18 Championships, where they won silver, and the 2016 World Junior Ice Hockey Championships. He played for the senior team at the 2021 IIHF World Championship, 2022 IIHF World Championship, where they won bronze medals, and 2023 IIHF World Championship. Smejkal also represented the Czech national team at the 2022 Winter Olympics.

== Career statistics ==
=== Regular season and playoffs ===
			Regular season					Playoffs
Season	Team	League	GP	G	A	Pts	PIM	GP	G	A	Pts	PIM
2011–12	HC Mountfield	CZE U18	15	5	4	9	6	—	—	—	—	—
2012–13	HC Mountfield	CZE U18	36	16	27	43	63	5	2	1	3	14
2012–13	HC Mountfield	CZE U20	1	0	0	0	0	—	—	—	—	—
2013–14	ČEZ Motor České Budějovice	CZE U18	7	5	5	10	20	7	5	5	10	4
2013–14	ČEZ Motor České Budějovice	CZE U20	28	7	12	19	12	—	—	—	—	—
2014–15	Moose Jaw Warriors	WHL	72	12	20	32	50	—	—	—	—	—
2015–16	Moose Jaw Warriors	WHL	28	4	14	18	34	—	—	—	—	—
2015–16	Kamloops Blazers	WHL	30	1	8	9	18	7	0	1	1	2
2016–17	KHL Medveščak Zagreb	KHL	26	3	1	4	6	—	—	—	—	—
2016–17	HC Sparta Praha	ELH	9	0	2	2	0	1	0	0	0	0
2017–18	HC Sparta Praha	ELH	26	4	2	6	16	—	—	—	—	—
2017–18	Piráti Chomutov	ELH	17	4	5	9	24	—	—	—	—	—
2018–19	HC Sparta Praha	ELH	47	7	9	16	20	4	0	0	0	2
2019–20	HC Sparta Praha	ELH	47	13	18	31	51	—	—	—	—	—
2020–21	Tappara	Liiga	48	9	17	26	28	9	0	0	0	29
2021–22	Lahti Pelicans	Liiga	44	25	20	45	32	3	1	1	2	22
2022–23	IK Oskarshamn	SHL	49	23	20	43	30	3	1	1	2	0
2023–24	Belleville Senators	AHL	47	9	13	22	16	7	0	0	0	2
2023–24	Ottawa Senators	NHL	20	1	1	2	4	—	—	—	—	—
2024–25	HC Dynamo Pardubice	ELH	41	11	17	28	24	16	7	2	9	14
2025–26	HC Dynamo Pardubice	ELH	14	4	5	9	2	17	5	3	8	2
ELH totals			201	43	58	101	137	38	12	5	17	18
NHL totals			20	1	1	2	4	—	—	—	—	—

=== International ===
Year	Team	Event	Result	GP	G	A	Pts	PIM
2014	Czech Republic	WJC18	2nd place, silver medalist(s)	6	4	0	4	0
2016	Czech Republic	WJC	5th	5	2	2	4	0
2021	Czech Republic	WC	7th	8	1	1	2	0
2022	Czech Republic	OG	9th	4	1	0	1	2
2022	Czech Republic	WC	3rd place, bronze medalist(s)	10	2	3	5	0
2023	Czech Republic	WC	8th	8	0	1	1	2
Junior totals				11	6	2	8	0
Senior totals				30	4	5	9	4
