= Cole Reinhardt =

Canadian ice hockey player (born 2000)

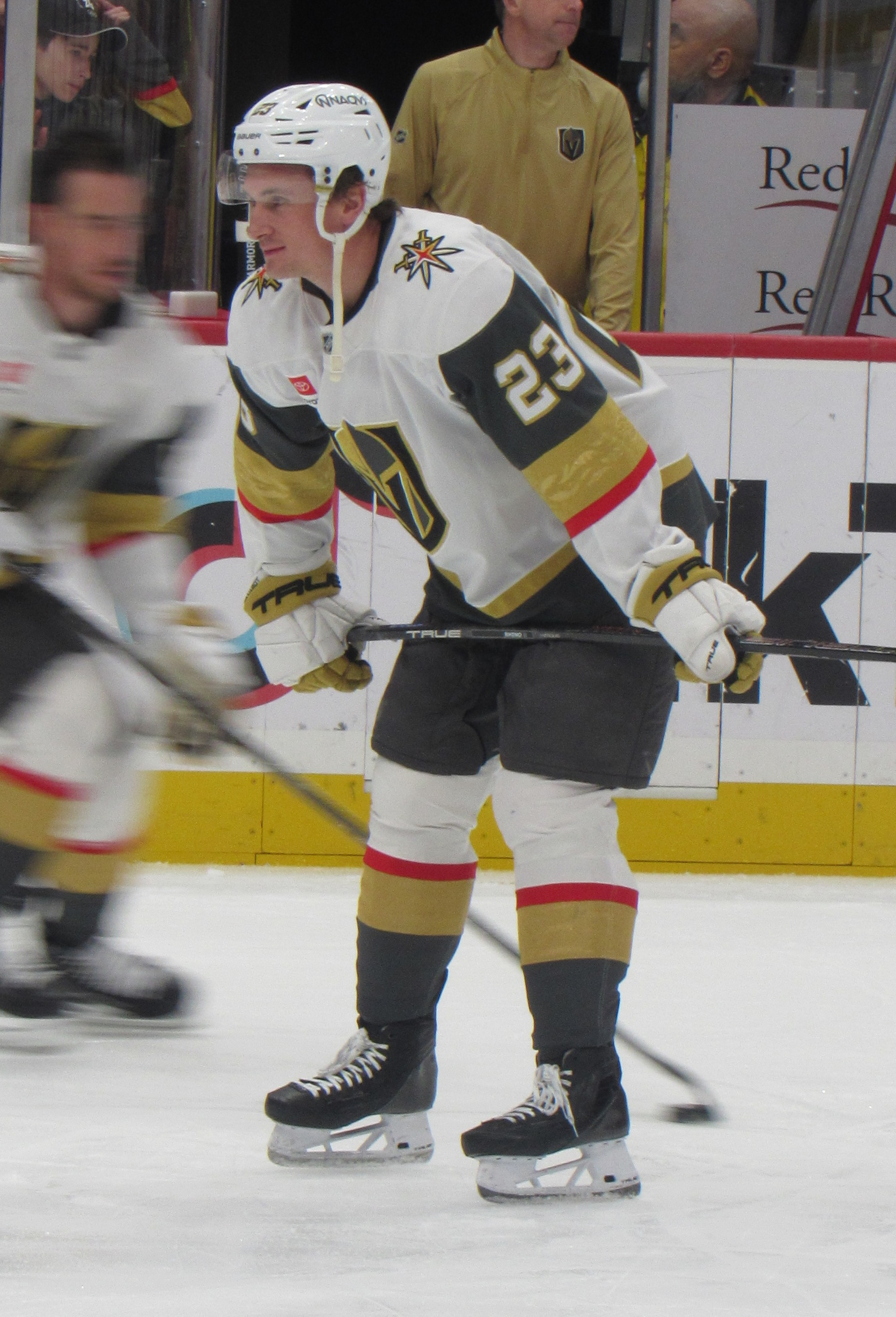
- Reinhardt with the Vegas Golden Knights in 2026
- Born: February 1, 2000 (age 26) Calgary, Alberta, Canada
- Height: 6 ft 1 in (185 cm)
- Weight: 207 lb (94 kg; 14 st 11 lb)
- Position: Left wing
- Shoots: Left
- NHL team (P) Cur. team Former teams: Florida Panthers; Charlotte Checkers (AHL); Ottawa Senators; Vegas Golden Knights
- NHL draft: 181st overall, 2020; Ottawa Senators
- Playing career: 2021–present

Cole Reinhardt (born February 1, 2000) is a Canadian professional ice hockey player who is a left winger for the Charlotte Checkers of the American Hockey League (AHL) while under contract to the Florida Panthers of the National Hockey League (NHL). Reinhardt was drafted by the Ottawa Senators in the sixth round of the 2020 NHL entry draft with the 181st overall pick, and has also played in the NHL for the Vegas Golden Knights.

== Playing career ==
Reinhardt played four seasons of junior with the Brandon Wheat Kings of the Western Hockey League (WHL). He compiled 75 goals and 141 points in 252 games in the WHL. As an overage player, Ottawa drafted him in the sixth round, 181st overall in the 2020 NHL entry draft. He made his professional debut with Ottawa's American Hockey League (AHL) affiliate Belleville Senators in 2020, on an amateur tryout. Happy with his play, Ottawa signed him to a three-year entry-level contract in April 2021, commencing with the 2021–22 season. In the 2020–21 season, Reinhardt scored six goals and twelve points in 33 games. Reinhardt returned to Belleville for the 2021–22 season and improved his statistics to 15 goals and 30 points in 70 games. Reinhardt was recalled by Ottawa on April 7, 2022. He played in his first and only NHL game of the season in a 3–2 loss to the Nashville Predators on April 7, 2022. He was returned to Belleville on April 8.

Reinhardt played the 2022–23 season with Belleville, reaching a career high in points in a season, with 11 goals and 34 points in 66 games. Invited to Ottawa's training in September 2023, he was assigned to Belleville on October 2 to begin the 2023–24 season. Reinhardt spent the entire season in Belleville and played in all seven of Belleville's games in the Calder Cup playoffs, scoring one goal. It was announced he signed a one-year, two-way contract extension with Ottawa on June 14, 2024.

Reinhardt was placed on waivers in October and cleared. He was assigned to Belleville to start the 2024–25 season. He was recalled by Ottawa on October 25 after David Perron left the team for personal reasons. He made his NHL season debut on that night against the Vegas Golden Knights and registered his first NHL point, assisting on Adam Gaudette's first goal of the game. He appeared in one more before being returned to Belleville on October 28. Reinhardt was recalled by Ottawa for its November 25 game against the Calgary Flames, where he scored his first NHL goal. On January 11, 2025, in a game against the Pittsburgh Penguins, Reinhardt suffered an upper body injury that kept him out of the lineup until January 28, when he was placed on waivers again, and after going unclaimed, was assigned to Belleville. After injuries Josh Norris, Nick Cousins, and Noah Gregor, Reinhardt was recalled on February 2, and bounced between the teams for most of February, when he was once again assigned to Belleville.

As a free agent from Ottawa following the season, Reinhardt signed a two-year contract with the Vegas Golden Knights on July 1, 2025. After making the Golden Knights' season-opening roster, Reinhardt debuted for Vegas on October 14, 2025, playing nine minutes in a 4–2 victory over the Calgary Flames. Two nights later, on October 16, Reinhardt scored his first goal as a Golden Knight in a 6–5 win over the Boston Bruins. On March 5, 2026, Reinhardt was placed on waivers by Vegas, and was subsequently claimed by the Florida Panthers the following day. He played in his first game for the team on March 12 in a 2–1 overtime win over the Columbus Blue Jackets. He marked his first goal and point for the team on March 19 in 4–0 shutout win over the Edmonton Oilers. He was placed on waivers during the Panthers 2026 training camp and after going unclaimed, was assigned to their AHL affiliate, the Charlotte Checkers to start the 2026–27 season.

== Career statistics ==
			Regular season					Playoffs
Season	Team	League	GP	G	A	Pts	PIM	GP	G	A	Pts	PIM
2016–17	Brandon Wheat Kings	WHL	61	3	4	7	20	2	0	0	0	0
2017–18	Brandon Wheat Kings	WHL	68	19	25	44	40	11	1	1	2	8
2018–19	Brandon Wheat Kings	WHL	67	22	23	45	53	—	—	—	—	—
2019–20	Brandon Wheat Kings	WHL	56	31	24	55	38	—	—	—	—	—
2020–21	Belleville Senators	AHL	33	6	6	12	8	—	—	—	—	—
2021–22	Belleville Senators	AHL	70	15	15	30	60	1	1	0	1	2
2021–22	Ottawa Senators	NHL	1	0	0	0	2	—	—	—	—	—
2022–23	Belleville Senators	AHL	66	11	23	34	91	—	—	—	—	—
2023–24	Belleville Senators	AHL	56	8	15	23	76	7	1	0	1	2
2024–25	Belleville Senators	AHL	45	14	18	32	40	—	—	—	—	—
2024–25	Ottawa Senators	NHL	17	1	1	2	15	—	—	—	—	—
2025–26	Vegas Golden Knights	NHL	44	3	4	7	19	—	—	—	—	—
2025–26	Florida Panthers	NHL	15	6	2	8	2	—	—	—	—	—
NHL totals			77	10	7	17	38	—	—	—	—	—
