= Hoyt Stanley =

- Born: February 4, 2005 (age 21), West Vancouver, British Columbia, Canada
- Height: 6 ft 3 in (191 cm)
- Weight: 213 lb (97 kg; 15 st 3 lb)
- Position: Defence
- Shoots: Right
- NHL team (P) Cur. team: Ottawa Senators; Belleville Senators (AHL)
- NHL draft: 108th overall, 2023; Ottawa Senators
- Playing career: 2026–present

Hoyt Elliot Ryder Stanley (born February 4, 2005) is a Canadian professional ice hockey player. He is a member of the Belleville Senators, the American Hockey League (AHL) affiliate of the Ottawa Senators of the National Hockey League (NHL).

== Early life ==
Stanley was born on February 4, 2005 in West Vancouver, British Columbia, Canada. Stanley is the son of Graham and Kyra Stanley. His father played professionally in the AHL, ECHL, and International Hockey League between 1989-91. after playing college hockey.

== Playing career ==
Prior to playing junior, Stanley played for St. George High School where he initially played forward but transitioned to defence to make the team. Stanley played junior hockey for the Victoria Grizzlies of the British Columbia Hockey League. After the 2022-23 season, he was drafted by the Ottawa Senators in the fourth round, 108th overall of the 2023 NHL entry draft.

Stanley chose to go to university and played for Cornell University for three seasons. Among his accomplishments, he was named to the 2025 ECAC Hockey All-Academic Team, and was a finalist for the ECAC Hockey Best Defensive Defenseman award in 2026. At the end of the 2025-26 season, after graduating from Cornell's SC Johnson School of Business, he signed a three-year entry-level contract with Ottawa, and he joined the Belleville Senators for six games to make his professional debut.

In September 2026, Stanley made a strong push to make the Ottawa squad and was one of the final cuts, being assigned to Belleville just before Ottawa's first game. He was later called up after Jake Sanderson was injured. Stanley made his NHL debut on October 8, 2026 in Ottawa versus the Philadelphia Flyers in a 2-1 victory. After Artem Zub returned from injury, Stanley was assigned to Belleville.

== Career statistics ==
			Regular season					Playoffs
Season	Team	League	GP	G	A	Pts	PIM	GP	G	A	Pts	PIM
2021–22	Victoria Grizzlies	BCHL	13	0	1	1	8	5	1	3	4	0
2022–23	Victoria Grizzlies	BCHL	53	4	34	38	30	4	0	1	1	6
2023–24	Cornell University	ECAC	35	2	8	10	22	—	—	—	—	—
2024–25	Cornell University	ECAC	35	2	11	13	40	—	—	—	—	—
2025–26	Cornell University	ECAC	34	3	12	15	33	—	—	—	—	—
2025–26	Belleville Senators	AHL	6	1	0	1	0	—	—	—	—	—
AHL totals			6	1	0	1	0	—	—	—	—	—
