= Angus Crookshank =

Canadian ice hockey player (born 1999)

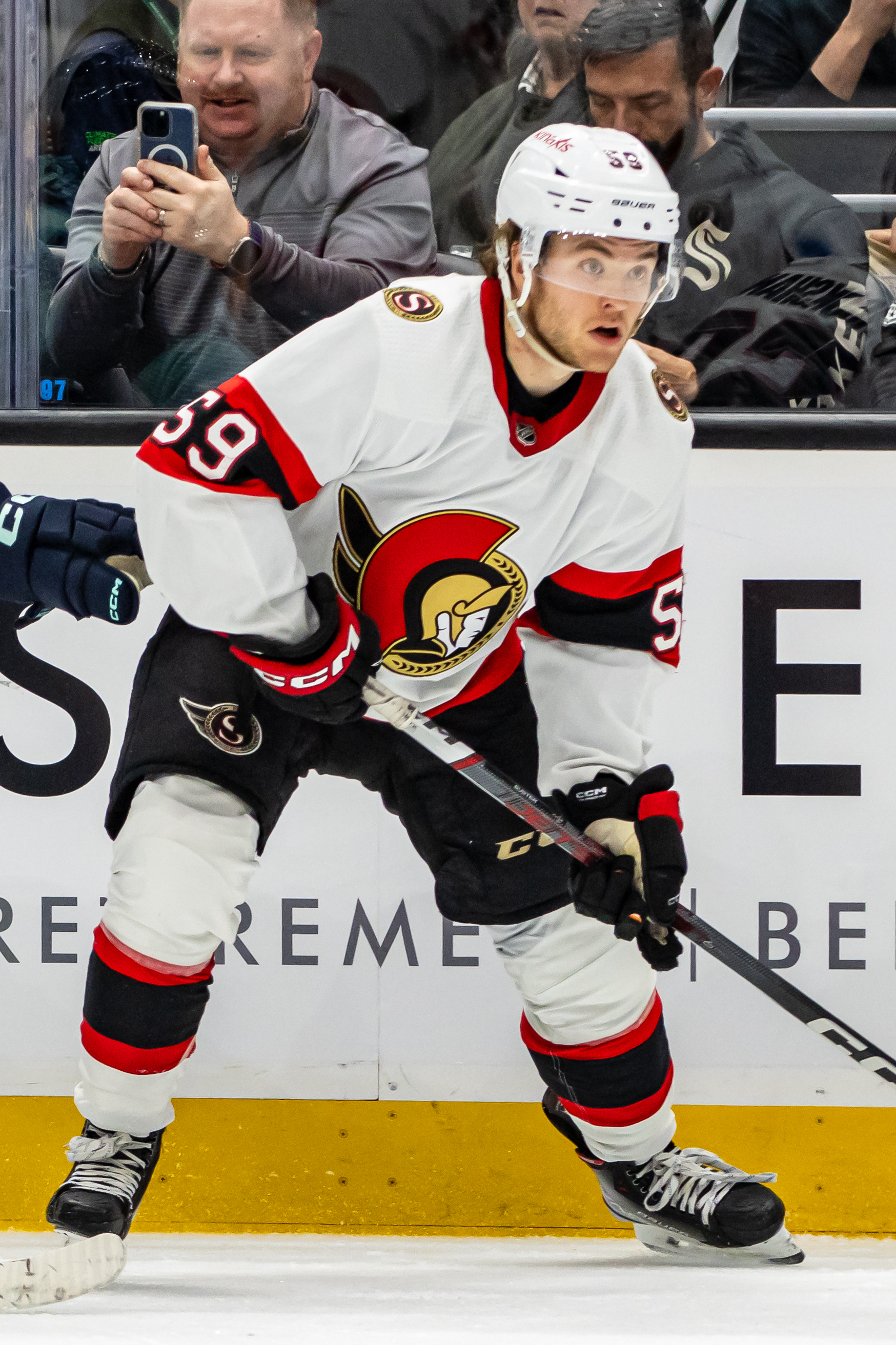
- Crookshank in 2024
- Born: October 2, 1999 (age 27) North Vancouver, British Columbia, Canada
- Height: 5 ft 10 in (178 cm)
- Weight: 181 lb (82 kg; 12 st 13 lb)
- Position: Left wing
- Shoots: Left
- NHL team (P) Cur. team Former teams: Florida Panthers; Charlotte Checkers (AHL); Ottawa Senators; New Jersey Devils
- NHL draft: 126th overall, 2018; Ottawa Senators
- Playing career: 2021–present

Angus Crookshank (born October 2, 1999) is a Canadian professional ice hockey player who is a left winger for the Charlotte Checkers of the American Hockey League (AHL) while under contract to the Florida Panthers of the National Hockey League (NHL). Crookshank was selected 126th overall in the fifth round of the 2018 NHL entry draft by the Ottawa Senators, and has also played for the New Jersey Devils

== Playing career ==
=== Amateur ===
Crookshank played junior hockey with the Langley Rivermen of the British Columbia Hockey League (BCHL). Following his final year in the BCHL, Crookshank committed to play college hockey for the University of New Hampshire Wildcats program in the Hockey East conference. In his first season with the Wildcats in 2018–19, he put up ten goals and 13 assists for 23 points in 36 games played. He returned for the 2019–20 season and appeared in 34 games, scoring 16 times and recording 22 points before the National Collegiate Athletic Association cancelled the season on March 12, 2020 due to the COVID-19 pandemic. For the pandemic-delayed 2020–21 season, he tallied nine goals and 18 points in 20 games played. In his final year, Crookshank was named a Third Team Hockey East All-Star. In his three seasons with the New Hampshire Wildcats, he scored 35 goals and 63 points in 90 career games.

=== Professional ===
Crookshank was selected by the Ottawa Senators of the National Hockey League (NHL) in the fifth round, 126th overall, in the 2018 NHL entry draft. After completing his third year with the Wildcats, Crookshank signed a three-year entry-level contract with Ottawa on March 17, 2021. He was immediately assigned to Ottawa's American Hockey League (AHL) affiliate, the Belleville Senators for the remainder of the season. In 19 games he marked five goals and 16 points. The following 2021–22 season was over shortly after it began, as Crookshank suffered a season-ending anterior cruciate ligament injury in training camp. He returned to Belleville for the 2022–23 season and scored a team-leading 26 goals and 47 points in 71 games, good for fourth overall on the team.

Crookshank was assigned to the AHL to begin the 2023–24 season. Crookshank was recalled by Ottawa on December 16 after injuries to forwards Mathieu Joseph and Rourke Chartier. He made his NHL debut in a 6–3 loss to the Vegas Golden Knights on December 17. In his second game, he scored his first NHL goal against Connor Ingram in a 4–3 loss to the Arizona Coyotes. He played in seven games with Ottawa, scoring the one goal and two points before being sent back to Belleville on January 7, 2024. Crookshank was named to the 2024 AHL All-Star Classic representing Belleville along with teammate Maxence Guénette. On March 1, Crookshank was named the AHL Player of the Month for February after tallying eight goals and 14 points in 12 games. He finished with 24 goals and 46 points in 50 games with Belleville, before being recalled on March 21 in case Claude Giroux felt he could not play due to an illness. However, he made the lineup for the following game against the New Jersey Devils on March 23, replacing Zack Ostapchuk. In his sixth game after his call-up, Crookshank suffered a lower-body injury in a game against the Minnesota Wild that ended his season. He was returned to Belleville on April 23 and suited up for the team in the playoffs. In Belleville's seven playoff games, he scored one goal and two points as they were eliminated by the Cleveland Monsters in the second round.

Crookshank signed a one-year, two-way contract extension with Ottawa on June 12, 2024. He was assigned to Belleville to start the 2024–25 season. He was recalled on February 26, 2025 after injuries to Brady Tkachuk, Josh Norris, and Shane Pinto and made his NHL season debut that night against the Winnipeg Jets. He was returned to Belleville after the one game. He received a second call up on April 1 after Tkachuk missed time again. He was placed on the fourth line with Adam Gaudette and Matthew Highmore. He recorded his first point of the season assisting on Thomas Chabot's game-tying goal in the third period of a 4–3 overtime win over the Philadelphia Flyers on April 13. He was returned to Belleville on April 16, having recorded just the one assist in eight games for Ottawa. In 62 games with Belleville, he scored 22 goals and 40 points.

On July 1, 2025, Crookshank was signed as a free agent by the New Jersey Devils to a two-year, $1.55 million contract. He was placed on waivers and after going unclaimed by other NHL teams, was assigned to New Jersey's AHL affiliate, the Utica Devils to being the 2025–26 season. He was recalled on December 5 and made his NHL season debut that night against the Golden Knights. He tallied his first goal for the Devils on December 11 in an 8–4 loss to the Tampa Bay Lightning. He appeared in eight games with New Jersey, scoring the one goal before being sent back to Utica on December 28. In 60 games with Utica, he scored 24 goals and 36 points.

On June 30, 2026, Crookshank was traded to the Florida Panthers, alongside goaltender Jacob Markström, in exchange for forwards Jesper Boqvist, Evan Rodrigues, and Ben Steeves. To start the 2026–27 season, he was placed on waivers and having gone unclaimed, was assigned to Florida's AHL affiliate, the Charlotte Checkers.

== Career statistics ==
| | | | Regular season | | | | | Playoffs |
| Season | Team | League | GP | G | A | Pts | PIM | GP | G | A | Pts | PIM |
|---|---|---|---|---|---|---|---|---|---|---|---|---|
| 2015–16 | Langley Rivermen | BCHL | 4 | 1 | 0 | 1 | 0 | 1 | 0 | 0 | 0 | 0 |
| 2016–17 | Langley Rivermen | BCHL | 31 | 9 | 12 | 21 | 14 | 6 | 2 | 1 | 3 | 0 |
| 2017–18 | Langley Rivermen | BCHL | 42 | 22 | 23 | 45 | 34 | 6 | 3 | 4 | 7 | 6 |
| 2018–19 | University of New Hampshire | HE | 36 | 10 | 13 | 23 | 6 | — | — | — | — | — |
| 2019–20 | University of New Hampshire | HE | 34 | 16 | 6 | 22 | 39 | — | — | — | — | — |
| 2020–21 | University of New Hampshire | HE | 20 | 9 | 9 | 18 | 4 | — | — | — | — | — |
| 2020–21 | Belleville Senators | AHL | 19 | 5 | 11 | 16 | 6 | — | — | — | — | — |
| 2022–23 | Belleville Senators | AHL | 71 | 26 | 21 | 47 | 31 | — | — | — | — | — |
| 2023–24 | Belleville Senators | AHL | 50 | 24 | 22 | 46 | 60 | 7 | 1 | 1 | 2 | 4 |
| 2023–24 | Ottawa Senators | NHL | 13 | 2 | 1 | 3 | 4 | — | — | — | — | — |
| 2024–25 | Belleville Senators | AHL | 62 | 22 | 18 | 40 | 36 | — | — | — | — | — |
| 2024–25 | Ottawa Senators | NHL | 8 | 0 | 1 | 1 | 0 | — | — | — | — | — |
| 2025–26 | Utica Comets | AHL | 60 | 24 | 12 | 36 | 14 | — | — | — | — | — |
| 2025–26 | New Jersey Devils | NHL | 8 | 1 | 0 | 1 | 4 | — | — | — | — | — |
| NHL totals | | | 29 | 3 | 2 | 5 | 8 | — | — | — | — | — |
