= Anton Forsberg =

Swedish ice hockey player (born 1992)

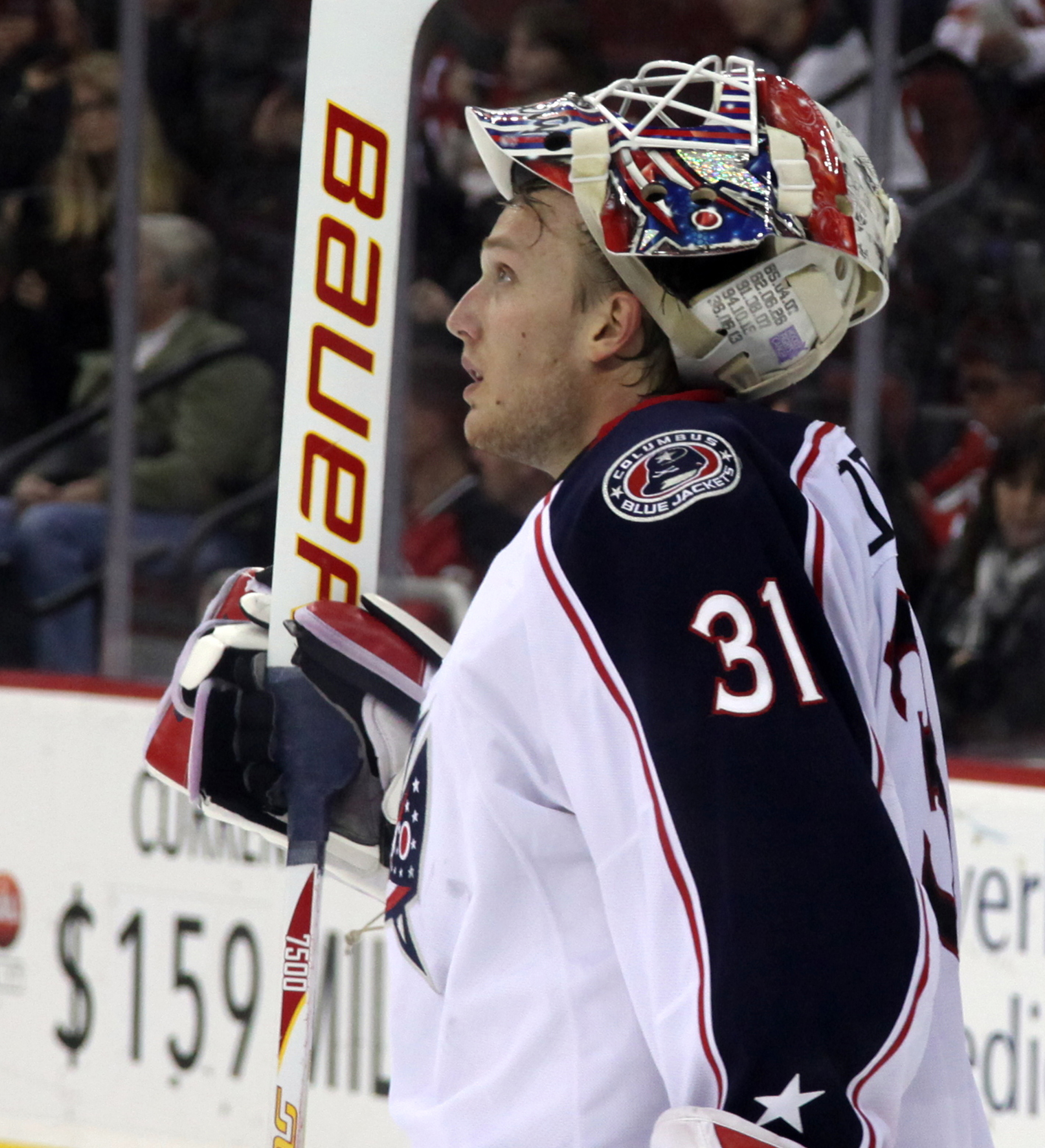
- Forsberg with the Columbus Blue Jackets in 2014
- Born: 27 November 1992 (age 33) Härnösand, Sweden
- Height: 6 ft 3 in (191 cm)
- Weight: 192 lb (87 kg; 13 st 10 lb)
- Position: Goaltender
- Catches: Left
- NHL team Former teams: Los Angeles Kings; Modo Hockey; Columbus Blue Jackets; Chicago Blackhawks; Carolina Hurricanes; Ottawa Senators
- NHL draft: 188th overall, 2011; Columbus Blue Jackets
- Playing career: 2008–present

Anton Forsberg (born 27 November 1992) is a Swedish professional ice hockey player who is a goaltender for the Los Angeles Kings of the National Hockey League (NHL). He was selected by the Columbus Blue Jackets in the seventh round (188th overall) of the 2011 NHL entry draft. Forsberg played for the Lake Erie Monsters and went undefeated during the playoffs en route to winning the 2016 Calder Cup playoffs. He has also played in the NHL for the Chicago Blackhawks, Carolina Hurricanes, and Ottawa Senators.

== Playing career ==
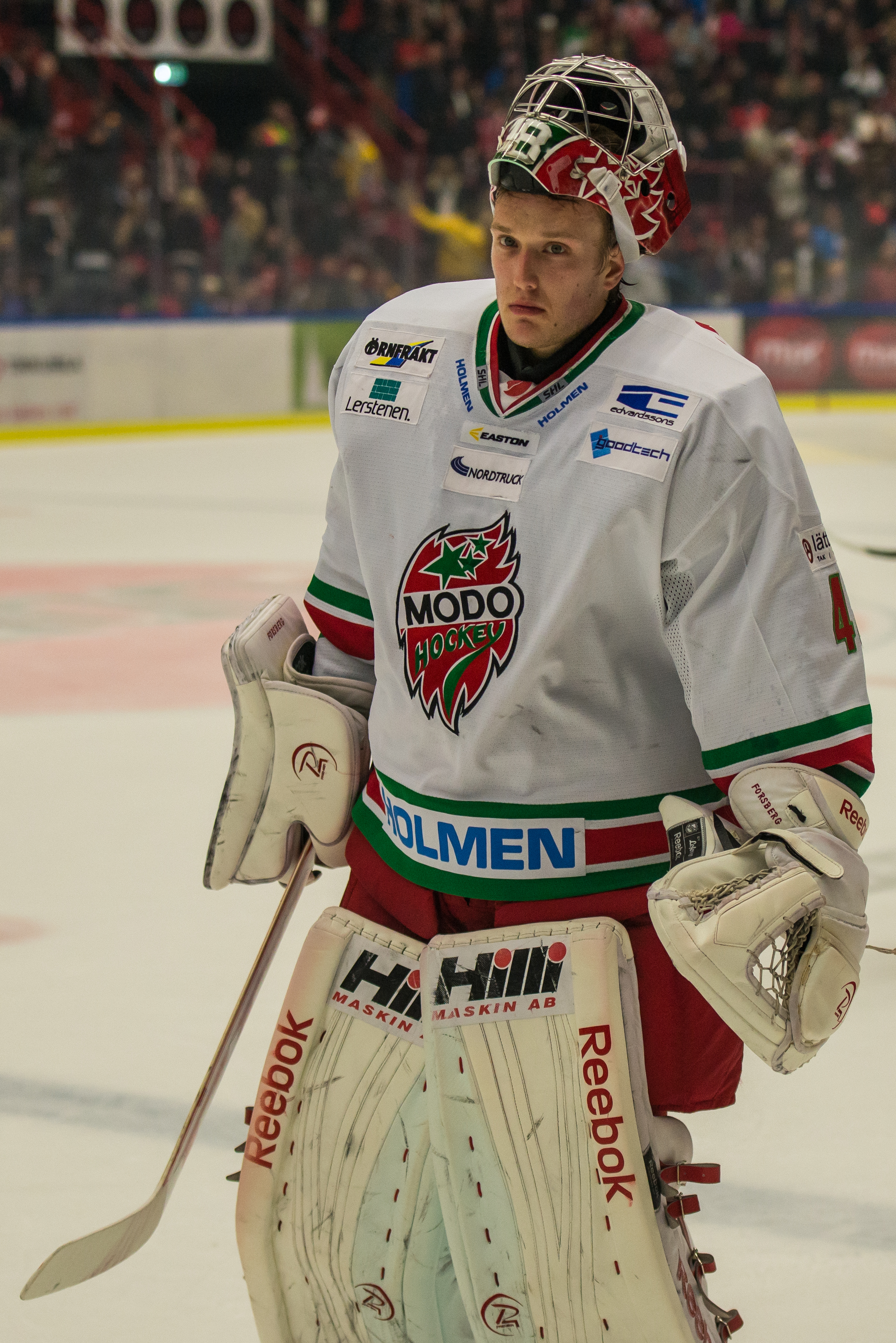
Forsberg with Modo Hockey in 2013

=== Sweden ===
Forsberg played in his native Sweden as a youth with Modo Hockey. In the 2011–12 season, Forsberg made his senior debut with Modo in the top tier Elitserien. He played in 15 games, with a record of four wins and five losses (4–5–0), a goals against average (GAA) of 3.05 and a save percentage of .901. He was loaned to Södertälje SK of the second-tier HockeyAllsvenskan for the 2012–13 season. In 33 appearances, he had a record of 24–9–0, three shutouts, a GAA of 2.04 (second best in the league) and a save percentage of .933. Södertälje was among the teams vying for promotion to the Elitserien and took part in the 2013 Kvalserien. Södertälje remained in the HockeyAllsvenskan and Forsberg went 2–5–0, with a GAA of 2.99 and a save percentage of .901. For the 2013–14 season, he returned to Modo, where he went 11–11–0 with one shutout, a GAA of 2.44 and a save percentage of .920.

=== National Hockey League ===
==== Columbus Blue Jackets ====
Forsberg was selected 188th overall by the Columbus Blue Jackets of the National Hockey League (NHL) during the 2011 NHL entry draft. On 28 May 2013, the Blue Jackets signed Forsberg to a three-year, entry-level contract, and he was assigned to play with their affiliate, the Springfield Falcons of the American Hockey League (AHL) after the completion of the Swedish 2013–14 season. Forsberg subsequently played his first professional game in North America on 1 April 2014, stopping 25 of 26 shots to lead the Falcons to a 3–1 win over the Bridgeport Sound Tigers. He made four appearances with Springfield, going 3–0–0, with a GAA of 1.13 and a save percentage of .957. The Falcons made the 2014 Calder Cup playoffs but were eliminated in the first round by the Providence Bruins. Forsberg made two appearances in the playoffs backing up starter Malcolm Subban, going 0–1–0, with a GAA of 3.03 and save percentage .917. During the 2014–15 AHL season, he helped the Falcons reach a new franchise record of 11 consecutive wins while playing in 10 of those games. As a result of his success, Forsberg was recalled on 20 October 2014 and made his NHL debut on 1 November against the New Jersey Devils at the Prudential Center. He appeared in one more game before he was sent back to Springfield on 14 November. He was named the AHL Goaltender of the Month for November by the AHL. Forsberg and teammate Austin Madaisky were selected to represent Springfield at the 2015 AHL All-Star Classic. He was recalled again by Columbus on 26 January 2015 after starting goaltender Sergei Bobrovsky went down with an injury and made three more appearances before being returned to Springfield on 25 February. In five games with Columbus, he went 0–4–0, with a GAA of 4.69 and a save percentage of .866. He finished the season with Springfield, going 20–8–1, a GAA of 2.01, and a save percentage of .927.

In his second season in North America in 2015–16, Forsberg was assigned to Columbus' new AHL affiliate, the Lake Erie Monsters. Forsberg was recalled to the NHL on an emergency basis on 2 January 2016 after Bobrovsky suffered an injury. Forsberg entered the game against the Washington Capitals that night as the backup to Curtis McElhinney. However, McElhinney suffered an injury and did not come out for overtime as the game was tied 4–4. Despite Forsberg letting one goal in, the Blue Jackets won the game and he recorded his first career NHL win and became the first goaltender to do so after entering the game post-regulation. He made four appearances with Columbus, going 1–3–0 with a GAA of 3.03 and a save percentage of .907 before being re-assigned to the Monsters. With the Monsters he helped lead the team to the 2016 Calder Cup playoffs, posting a record of 23–10–6 in 41 games, recording two shutouts, a GAA of 2.40 and a save percentage of .914. The team clinched their first Calder Cup championship in franchise history by winning all nine starts in the playoffs, with a GAA of 1.34 and a save percentage of .949. On 17 June, Forsberg was signed to a one-year contract extension to remain within the Blue Jackets organization.

After attending the Blue Jackets training camp, Forsberg was reassigned to the AHL to begin the 2016–17 season. He spent the majority of the campaign with the Monsters, playing in 51 games with a record of 27–17–6, posting two shutouts, a GAA of 2.28 and a save percentage of .926. He was selected to represent the Monsters, alongside teammates Oliver Bjorkstrand and Ryan Craig, at the 2017 AHL All-Star Classic. On 10 January 2017, Forsberg was recalled by the Blue Jackets and made his first appearance in a 5–3 loss to the Carolina Hurricanes that night. He was returned to Cleveland on 13 February.

==== Chicago Blackhawks and Carolina Hurricanes ====
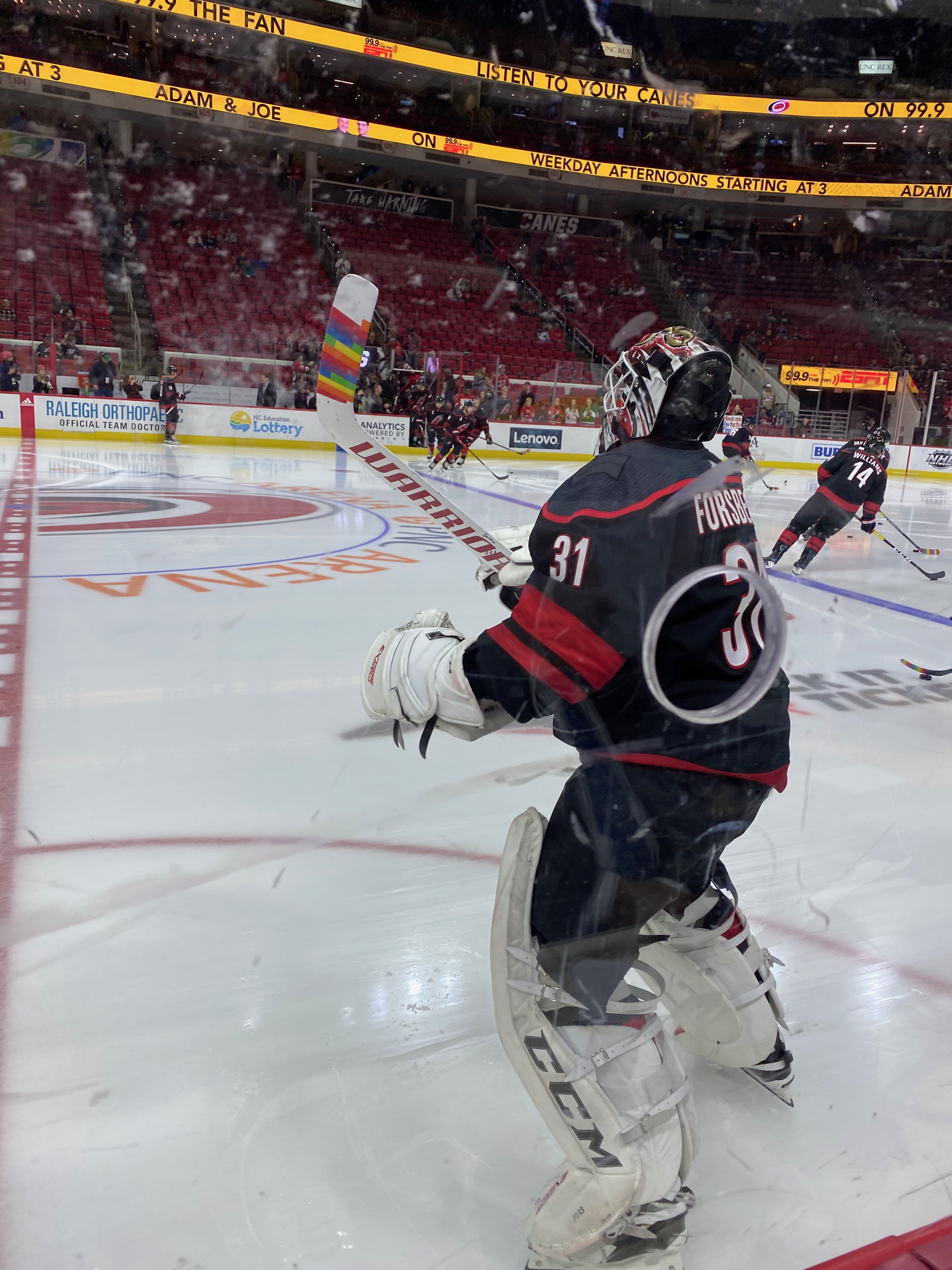
Forsberg with the Carolina Hurricanes in 2020

On 23 June 2017, Forsberg was traded by the Blue Jackets, alongside forward Brandon Saad and a fifth-round pick in 2018, to the Chicago Blackhawks in exchange for forwards Artemi Panarin and Tyler Motte, and a sixth-round pick in 2017. Three days later, on 26 June, Forsberg signed a two-year contract with the Blackhawks. He made his Blackhawks debut in the 2017–18 season on 9 October in a 4–3 overtime loss to the Toronto Maple Leafs. Forsberg had been brought in to the backup to starter Corey Crawford, but when Crawford suffered an injury at the end of December, Forsberg took over the role. In 35 games with Chicago, he had a record of 10–16–4, a GAA of 2.97 and a save percentage of .908. In his second season with the Blackhawks organization, he failed to make the team out of training camp and was placed on waivers. Having gone unclaimed, he was assigned to Chicago's AHL affiliate, the Rockford IceHogs to begin the 2018–19 season. He spent the entire season with the IceHogs going 15–15–3 with a GAA of 2.64 and a save percentage of .919.

On 24 June 2019, Forsberg was traded to the Carolina Hurricanes along with defenceman Gustav Forsling in exchange for defenceman Calvin de Haan and forward Aleksi Saarela. He was assigned to Carolina's AHL affiliate, the Charlotte Checkers to begin the 2019–20 season. He spent the majority of the season with Charlotte, appearing in 27 games, going 15–9–2, with a GAA of 2.95 and a save percentage of .905. He was recalled on 23 February 2020 by Carolina after both of the team's goaltenders were injured in the same game. Forsberg made his Hurricanes debut on 28 February in a 3–2 loss to the Colorado Avalanche. He recorded his first win on 7 March in a 3–2 victory over the New York Islanders. However, it was the last time he would play that campaign as the season was suspended on 12 March on account of the COVID-19 pandemic.

Forsberg left the Hurricanes at the conclusion of his contract and as an unrestricted free agent agreed to sign a one-year, $700,000 contract with the Edmonton Oilers on 9 October 2020. Prior to the start of the pandemic-shortened 2020–21 season, Forsberg was waived by the Oilers and subsequently claimed and reacquired by the Carolina Hurricanes on 12 January 2021. Claimed to provide insurance for the waiving of former teammate, Alex Nedeljkovic, Forsberg was returned on waivers once Nedeljkovic cleared and was claimed by the Winnipeg Jets on 16 January 2021.

==== Ottawa Senators ====
After two months on the Jets roster without featuring for the club, Forsberg continued his journeyman season after he was claimed off waivers from the Jets by the Ottawa Senators on 17 March 2021. Forsberg played one game for Ottawa's AHL affiliate, the Belleville Senators, then was recalled to Ottawa. Forsberg suited up for the first time with Ottawa on 22 March in a backup role, and started in net on 25 March. He served as backup to Matt Murray in Ottawa's net, though was initially acquired due to a series of injuries to the goaltenders in the Senators franchise. He earned his first victory on 3 April in a 6–3 win over the Montreal Canadiens in his second start. On 5 May, Forsberg signed a one-year contract extension with the Senators. He finished the season with a record of 3–4–1 in eight games, a GAA of 3.21 and a save percentage of .909.

For the 2021–22 season, Forsberg started as Murray's backup. However, Murray's poor play and injuries allowed Forsberg to became the starter, and he appeared in 46 games for the Senators going 22–17–4, with a GAA of 2.82 and a save percentage of .917. On 11 December he recorded his first NHL career shutout with the team, a 4–0 win over the Tampa Bay Lightning. On 27 December, the Senators placed Forsberg in COVID-19 protocol. On 21 March 2022, the Senators signed Forsberg to a three-year, $8.25 million contract extension. After the acquisition of Cam Talbot during the 2022 off-season, it was planned that the two goalies would form a tandem for the 2022–23 season. However, Talbot struggled with injuries. Forsberg was coming off his third consecutive win when on 11 February 2023 in a game versus the Edmonton Oilers, Forsberg tore the medial collateral ligament in both knees in a collision with teammate Travis Hamonic and the Oilers' Zach Hyman. He was stretchered off the ice and missed the remainder of the season. In 28 games he had a record of 11–11–2 with two shutouts, a GAA of 3.26 and a save percentage of .902.

Forsberg surprised many by recovering from the dual MCL tears well enough to play the first preseason game in the 2023–24 NHL season. Joonas Korpisalo had been brought in during the offseason to be Ottawa's new starting goaltender. However, in November, Korpisalo went down with an injury and Forsberg took over as the team's starter. Korpisalo came back and resumed his position as starter. On 7 January 2024, Forsberg suffered a groin injury causing him to miss ten games. In 30 games, Forsberg went 15–12–0, with two shutouts, a GAA of 3.21, and a save percentage of .890. Forsberg had a new partner in Ottawa's net again in the 2024 offseason, as the Senators traded Korpisalo to the Boston Bruins for star netminder Linus Ullmark. Now Ullmark's backup for the 2024–25 season, he made 30 appearances, going 11–12–3 with three shutouts, a 2.72 GAA and a .901 save percentage. He suffered an injury in warmups on 14 December. He returned on 3 January 2025 in a 4–0 loss to the St. Louis Blues.

==== Los Angeles Kings ====
On 1 July 2025, Forsberg left Ottawa as an unrestricted free agent and signed a two-year, $4.5 million contract with the Los Angeles Kings. He was brought in by Kings management to be the backup to Darcy Kuemper. He made his Kings debut on 8 October in a 6–5 overtime win over the Vegas Golden Knights. In Forsberg's first appearance against the Senators as a member of the Kings, he recorded his first shutout with the team, a 1–0 win in Ottawa. In the second half of the season Forsberg showed strong play and finished the season with a 16–12–5, notching three shutouts, a GAA of 2.57 and a save percentage of .910. Ahead of the Kings' first round matchup against the Colorado Avalanche in the 2026 Stanley Cup playoffs, Forsberg was chosen to start over Kuemper, who suffered with inconsistency in the final month of the regular season. Forsberg made his first career NHL playoff start in the process, making 30 saves in a 2–1 loss. He continued to play the rest of the series as the Kings were swept in the best-of-seven series, losing all four games to the Avalanche.

== International play ==
Medal record

Representing Sweden

Ice hockey

World Junior Championships
| Gold medal – first place | 2012 Calgary | |

He was selected to compete for Team Sweden at the 2012 World Junior Ice Hockey Championships where he won gold.

== Personal life ==
Forsberg is a native of Härnösand in central Sweden. He has a wife and two children. Forsberg's father is a trainer and chiropractor in Sweden for a professional ice hockey team.

== Career statistics ==
=== Regular season and playoffs ===
| | | | Regular season | | | | | | | | | Playoffs |
| Season | Team | League | GP | W | L | T/OT | MIN | GA | SO | GAA | SV% | GP | W | L | MIN | GA | SO | GAA | SV% |
|---|---|---|---|---|---|---|---|---|---|---|---|---|---|---|---|---|---|---|---|
| 2007–08 | AIK Härnösand | Div.1 | 1 | — | — | — | 20 | 2 | 0 | 6.00 | .714 | — | — | — | — | — | — | — | — |
| 2009–10 | Modo Hockey | J20 | 21 | — | — | — | 1183 | 73 | 1 | 3.70 | .874 | 3 | — | — | 177 | 3 | 0 | 2.37 | .903 |
| 2010–11 | Modo Hockey | J20 | 33 | — | — | — | 1942 | 94 | 3 | 2.90 | .907 | 6 | — | — | 358 | 17 | 0 | 2.85 | .921 |
| 2010–11 | AIK Härnösand | Div.1 | 1 | — | — | — | 59 | 5 | 0 | 5.11 | .857 | — | — | — | — | — | — | — | — |
| 2011–12 | Modo Hockey | J20 | 14 | 11 | 3 | 0 | 847 | 31 | 2 | 2.19 | .923 | 4 | 1 | 3 | 248 | 14 | 0 | 3.39 | .891 |
| 2011–12 | Modo Hockey | SEL | 15 | 4 | 5 | 0 | 609 | 32 | 0 | 3.15 | .898 | — | — | — | — | — | — | — | — |
| 2012–13 | Södertälje SK | Allsv | 33 | 24 | 9 | 0 | 1972 | 67 | 3 | 2.04 | .933 | 8 | 2 | 5 | — | — | 0 | 3.00 | .901 |
| 2013–14 | Modo Hockey | SHL | 22 | 11 | 11 | 0 | 1304 | 53 | 1 | 2.44 | .919 | — | — | — | — | — | — | — | — |
| 2013–14 | Springfield Falcons | AHL | 4 | 3 | 0 | 0 | 212 | 4 | 0 | 1.13 | .957 | 2 | 0 | 1 | 59 | 3 | 0 | 3.03 | .917 |
| 2014–15 | Springfield Falcons | AHL | 30 | 20 | 8 | 1 | 1764 | 59 | 3 | 2.01 | .927 | — | — | — | — | — | — | — | — |
| 2014–15 | Columbus Blue Jackets | NHL | 5 | 0 | 4 | 0 | 256 | 20 | 0 | 4.69 | .866 | — | — | — | — | — | — | — | — |
| 2015–16 | Lake Erie Monsters | AHL | 41 | 23 | 10 | 5 | 2302 | 92 | 2 | 2.40 | .914 | 10 | 9 | 0 | 584 | 13 | 2 | 1.34 | .949 |
| 2015–16 | Columbus Blue Jackets | NHL | 4 | 1 | 3 | 0 | 178 | 9 | 0 | 3.03 | .907 | — | — | — | — | — | — | — | — |
| 2016–17 | Cleveland Monsters | AHL | 51 | 27 | 17 | 6 | 2977 | 113 | 4 | 2.28 | .926 | — | — | — | — | — | — | — | — |
| 2016–17 | Columbus Blue Jackets | NHL | 1 | 0 | 1 | 0 | 59 | 4 | 0 | 4.10 | .852 | — | — | — | — | — | — | — | — |
| 2017–18 | Chicago Blackhawks | NHL | 35 | 10 | 16 | 4 | 1715 | 85 | 0 | 2.97 | .908 | — | — | — | — | — | — | — | — |
| 2018–19 | Rockford IceHogs | AHL | 32 | 15 | 15 | 2 | 1906 | 84 | 0 | 2.64 | .919 | — | — | — | — | — | — | — | — |
| 2019–20 | Charlotte Checkers | AHL | 27 | 15 | 9 | 2 | 1568 | 77 | 0 | 2.95 | .905 | — | — | — | — | — | — | — | — |
| 2019–20 | Carolina Hurricanes | NHL | 3 | 1 | 1 | 0 | 144 | 8 | 0 | 3.35 | .897 | — | — | — | — | — | — | — | — |
| 2020–21 | Belleville Senators | AHL | 1 | 1 | 0 | 0 | 60 | 1 | 0 | 1.00 | .971 | — | — | — | — | — | — | — | — |
| 2020–21 | Ottawa Senators | NHL | 8 | 3 | 4 | 1 | 449 | 24 | 0 | 3.21 | .909 | — | — | — | — | — | — | — | — |
| 2021–22 | Ottawa Senators | NHL | 46 | 22 | 17 | 4 | 2572 | 121 | 1 | 2.82 | .917 | — | — | — | — | — | — | — | — |
| 2022–23 | Ottawa Senators | NHL | 28 | 11 | 11 | 2 | 1472 | 80 | 2 | 3.26 | .902 | — | — | — | — | — | — | — | — |
| 2023–24 | Ottawa Senators | NHL | 30 | 15 | 12 | 0 | 1570 | 84 | 2 | 3.21 | .890 | — | — | — | — | — | — | — | — |
| 2024–25 | Ottawa Senators | NHL | 30 | 11 | 12 | 3 | 1677 | 76 | 3 | 2.72 | .901 | — | — | — | — | — | — | — | — |
| 2025–26 | Los Angeles Kings | NHL | 36 | 16 | 12 | 5 | 2032 | 87 | 3 | 2.57 | .910 | 4 | 0 | 4 | 184 | 11 | 0 | 2.70 | .909 |
| SHL totals | | | 36 | 16 | 12 | 5 | 2,032 | 87 | 1 | 2.57 | .910 | — | — | — | — | — | — | — | — |
| NHL totals | | | 226 | 90 | 93 | 19 | 12,120 | 598 | 11 | 2.96 | .905 | 4 | 0 | 4 | 184 | 11 | 0 | 2.70 | .909 |

=== International ===
| Year | Team | Event | Result | GP | W | L | T | MIN | GA | SO | GAA | SV% |
|---|---|---|---|---|---|---|---|---|---|---|---|---|
| 2012 | Sweden | WJC | 1st place, gold medalist(s) | 2 | 1 | 0 | 0 | 60 | 1 | 0 | 0.99 | .933 |
| Junior totals | | | | 2 | 1 | 0 | 0 | 60 | 1 | 0 | 0.99 | .933 |

== Awards and honors ==
| Awards | Year |
AHL
| AHL All-Star Classic | 2015, 2017 |
| Calder Cup champion | 2016 |
