= Jacob Bernard-Docker =

Canadian ice hockey player (born 2000)

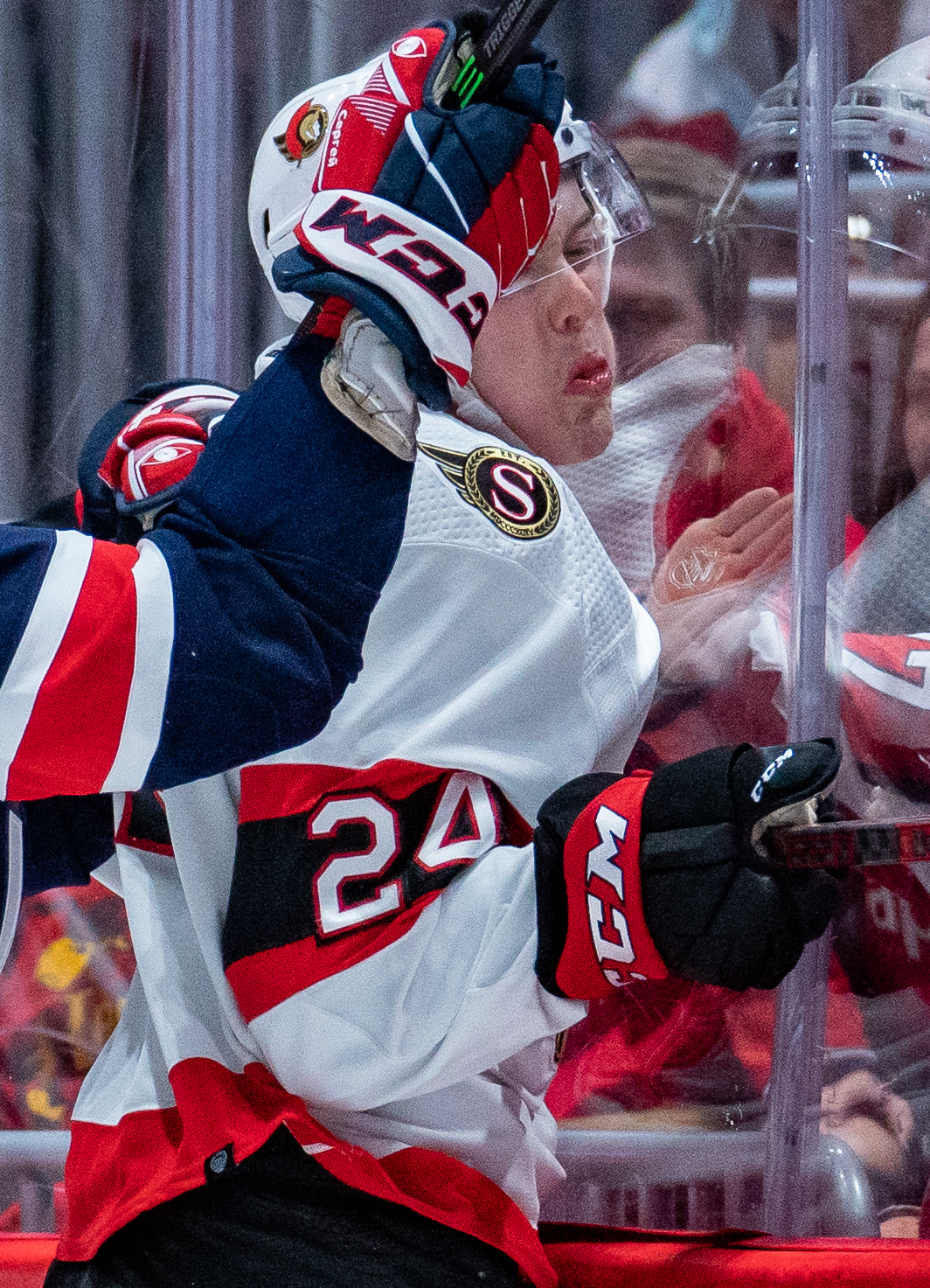
- Bernard-Docker with the Ottawa Senators in 2022
- Born: June 30, 2000 (age 26) Canmore, Alberta, Canada
- Height: 6 ft 1 in (185 cm)
- Weight: 196 lb (89 kg; 14 st 0 lb)
- Position: Defence
- Shoots: Right
- NHL team Former teams: Detroit Red Wings; Ottawa Senators; Buffalo Sabres
- National team: Canada
- NHL draft: 26th overall, 2018; Ottawa Senators
- Playing career: 2021–present

Jacob Bernard-Docker (born June 30, 2000) is a Canadian professional ice hockey player who is a defenceman for the Detroit Red Wings of the National Hockey League (NHL). Bernard-Docker was drafted in the first round, 26th overall, by the Ottawa Senators in the 2018 NHL entry draft.

== Early life ==
Bernard-Docker was born on June 30, 2000, in Canmore, Alberta, Canada to parents Thomas and Rolanda Bernard-Docker. Although he was born and raised in Canmore, his family spent every summer in Pictou County to visit his grandparents. Bernard-Docker played peewee ice hockey with a AA team in Cochrane and a bantam AAA in Airdrie, Alberta before enrolling at the Edge School for Athletes with his two younger siblings. During this time, he was selected to participate in the 2010 Brick Invitational Super Novice Tournament.

== Playing career ==
=== Amateur ===
While serving as captain of the Airdrie Extreme bantam AAA team, Bernard-Docker was drafted in the fifth round, 98th overall, by the Swift Current Broncos of the Western Hockey League's 2015 Bantam Draft. At the time of his selection, he had accumulated 20 points through 32 games. However, he chose to follow the Alberta Junior Hockey League (AJHL) route to maintain his American National Collegiate Athletic Association (NCAA) eligibility. Upon joining the Okotoks Oilers of the AJHL for the 2016–17 season, Bernard-Docker tallied seven goals and 15 assists through 54 games. During his rookie season with the Oilers, he participated in various health programs including Bell Let's Talk and the Royal Canadian Mounted Police's Drug Abuse Resistance Education program. In February 2017, Bernard-Docker committed to play college hockey for the University of North Dakota Fighting Hawks.

Bernard-Docker returned to the Oilers for the 2017–18 season where he greatly improved offensively and received numerous awards including the CJHL's Top Defenceman and W. G. (Bill) Scott Memorial Trophy. Bernard-Docker scored 20 goals and added 21 assists for 41 points through 49 games in order to tie sixth in offensive production among all AJHL defencemen. Leading up to the National Hockey League (NHL)'s 2018 entry draft, Bernard-Docker was placed 33rd overall for North American skaters in the final NHL Central Scouting Bureau rankings. Despite being drafted, Bernard-Docker stayed committed to the University of North Dakota.

=== Collegiate ===
Bernard-Docker played with the North Dakota Fighting Hawks from 2018 to 2021 while majoring in kinesiology. When speaking of his decision to go through the NCAA, Bernard-Docker said, "[t]he reputation of North Dakota moving guys on is a big factor in my decision, but the coaching staff was probably the biggest and their professionalism and knowledge of the game." Through his first 13 collegiate games, Bernard-Docker tallied nine points, including a three-game point streak, to tie for the team scoring leader. As such, he received the National Collegiate Hockey Conference (NCHC) Defenseman of the Week award for the period ending on November 26. As the season continued, Bernard-Docker was again named the NCHC Defenseman of the Week for the week ending on January 14 after he helped the Fighting Hawks sweep Colorado College. Bernard-Docker finished his season with five goals and added 12 assists for 17 points. He was also named an AHCA Krampade Division I All-American Scholar for having earned at least a 3.6 grade-point average during each semester of the 2018–19 academic year.

Following his freshman season, Bernard-Docker improved offensively and tallied three goals and 11 assists through his first 17 games of the 2019–20 season. On October 12, he became the first Fighting Hawks player to record four points in a single game since Tucker Poolman in 2017. He recorded his first career multi-goal game in the season finale at Omaha and finished the season with seven goals and 18 assists for 25 points through 32 games. Bernard-Docker was also named an NCHC Distinguished Scholar-Athlete and a member of the NCHC All-Academic Team. However, the NCHC's postseason was cancelled due to the COVID-19 pandemic.

Once collegiate hockey resumed in November 2020, Bernard-Docker was named an assistant captain for the Fighting Hawks alongside Mark Senden and Jasper Weatherby. He was also chosen for the 2020 NCHC Preseason All-Conference Team. In their season opener, Bernard-Docker and teammate Weatherby knelt during the national anthem. He finished the season with three goals and 18 points in 27 games.

=== Professional ===
Bernard-Docker was selected by the Ottawa Senators in the first round, 26th overall, of the 2018 NHL entry draft, making him the highest drafted Okotoks Oilers player in team history. On April 1, 2021, Bernard-Docker signalled the end of his collegiate career by signing a three-year, entry-level contract with Ottawa. He then made his NHL debut on April 14, playing 15:33 and blocking two shots, during a loss to the Winnipeg Jets. He made five appearances for Ottawa, going scoreless.

Bernard-Docker skated with members of the Senators roster instead of participating in the teams' development part of preseason camp. Before the start of the 2021–22 season, Bernard-Docker was assigned to the Senators American Hockey League (AHL) affiliate, the Belleville Senators, for the start of the season. After playing in 11 games with their AHL affiliate, tallying two goals and one assist, Bernard-Docker received his first NHL call-up of the season due to Nikita Zaitsev being added to the NHL's COVID-19 protocol. In his first NHL game of the season, he played 8:47 and tallied his first career NHL point by notching the primary assist on Zach Sanford's goal. He finished the season having played in eight games for Ottawa, recording the one point and 58 games for Belleville, adding two goals and nine points. Belleville qualified for the 2022 Calder Cup playoffs and faced the Rochester Americans in the opening round best-of-three series. Belleville was swept in two games, with Bernard-Docker going scoreless.

During the 2022–23 season, Bernard-Docker bounced between Belleville and Ottawa, being recalled several times as cover for injured players. He played alongside Thomas Chabot while in Ottawa. He finished the season with 19 games in Ottawa, marking just one point and 41 games with Belleville, tallying two goals and six points. A restricted free agent at season's end, Bernard-Docker signed a two-year contract extension with Ottawa. Bernard-Docker attended the Senators 2023 training camp, however, he failed to make the NHL team, and was placed on waivers, but went unclaimed. He was assigned to Belleville to start the 2023–24 season. After Artyom Zub suffered an injury, Bernard-Docker was recalled by Ottawa on October 23. Bernard-Docker scored his first NHL goal on December 7, 2023, against Joseph Woll on a slapshot in a 4–3 loss to the Toronto Maple Leafs. He remained with Ottawa for the remainder of the season, appearing in 72 games, scoring four goals and 14 points. In two appearances with Belleville before his recall, he went scoreless. He opened the 2024–25 season with Ottawa He suffered a high ankle sprain in January 2025 in a collision with teammate Zack Ostapchuk in practice. He remained out of the lineup into March. He made 25 appearances with Ottawa, recording one goal and four points.

On March 7, Bernard-Docker was traded to the Buffalo Sabres along with Josh Norris in exchange for Dylan Cozens, Dennis Gilbert, and a 2026 second-round pick. Bernard-Docker returned to practice with the Sabres on March 14 and made his Buffalo debut on March 22 against the Minnesota Wild. In his second game with Buffalo he recorded his first points with the Sabres, assisting on the team's first two goals in a 5–3 victory over the Winnipeg Jets. He scored his first goal with the Sabres in his third game and first back in Ottawa on March 25, scoring the game-tying goal in the second period, in a 3–2 win. He appeared in 15 games with Buffalo scoring the one goal and four points, playing mainly alongside Owen Power.

Released as an unrestricted free agent by the Sabres after not being tendered a qualifying offer, on July 1, 2025, Bernard-Docker was signed to a one-year, $875,000 contract with the Detroit Red Wings for the 2025–26 season. He played primarily with Albert Johansson on the third defensive paring. In 63 games, he scored one goal and five points. In the offseason he signed a two-year, $3.2 million extension with the Red Wings. He was injured to start the 2026–27 season and after being activated on October 8 from injured reserve, he was placed on waivers on October 17 without having appeared for the Red Wings. Having gone unclaimed, he was assigned to Detroit's AHL affiliate, the Grand Rapids Griffins on October 18.

== International play ==
Medal record

Representing Canada

Ice hockey

World Championships
Gold medal – first place	2021 Latvia	

World Junior Championships
Gold medal – first place	2020 Czech Republic	

He was invited to participate in Team Canada junior's selection camp ahead of the 2019 World Junior Ice Hockey Championships but was cut before the final roster was finalized. He was selected for Team Canada' junior team for the 2020 World Junior Ice Hockey Championships, the only player attended college to make the team. He played on Canada's top defence pairing, and assisted on Akil Thomas' game-winning goal in a 4–3 victory over Russia to win the gold medal.

Bernard-Docker was selected to replace injured defenceman Kevin Bahl for Team Canada during the 2021 IIHF World Championship. Canada advanced to the final, facing Finland, who they beat 3–2 in overtime to win the gold medal.

== Career statistics ==
=== Regular season and playoffs ===
			Regular season					Playoffs
Season	Team	League	GP	G	A	Pts	PIM	GP	G	A	Pts	PIM
2016–17	Okotoks Oilers	AJHL	54	7	15	22	12	12	2	5	7	8
2017–18	Okotoks Oilers	AJHL	49	20	21	41	34	15	7	7	14	8
2018–19	U. of North Dakota	NCHC	36	5	12	17	6	—	—	—	—	—
2019–20	U. of North Dakota	NCHC	32	7	18	25	12	—	—	—	—	—
2020–21	U. of North Dakota	NCHC	27	3	15	18	20	—	—	—	—	—
2020–21	Ottawa Senators	NHL	5	0	0	0	0	—	—	—	—	—
2021–22	Belleville Senators	AHL	58	2	7	9	22	2	0	0	0	0
2021–22	Ottawa Senators	NHL	8	0	1	1	4	—	—	—	—	—
2022–23	Belleville Senators	AHL	41	2	4	6	35	—	—	—	—	—
2022–23	Ottawa Senators	NHL	19	0	1	1	11	—	—	—	—	—
2023–24	Ottawa Senators	NHL	72	4	10	14	25	—	—	—	—	—
2023–24	Belleville Senators	AHL	2	0	0	0	2	—	—	—	—	—
2024–25	Ottawa Senators	NHL	25	1	3	4	4	—	—	—	—	—
2024–25	Buffalo Sabres	NHL	15	1	3	4	13	—	—	—	—	—
2025–26	Detroit Red Wings	NHL	63	1	4	5	25	—	—	—	—	—
NHL totals			207	7	22	29	82	—	—	—	—	—

=== International ===
Year	Team	Event	Result	GP	G	A	Pts	PIM
2020	Canada	WJC	1st place, gold medalist(s)	7	1	0	1	6
2021	Canada	WC	1st place, gold medalist(s)	10	0	0	0	0
Junior totals				7	1	0	1	6
Senior totals				10	0	0	0	0

== Awards and honours ==
Award	Year	Ref
College
All-NCHC Second Team	2020–21	

Awards and achievements
Preceded by Brady Tkachuk	Ottawa Senators first-round draft pick 2018	Succeeded by Lassi Thomson
Preceded by Colton Poolman	NCHC Defensive Defenseman of the Year; 2020–21	Succeeded by Ethan Frisch
