= Belleville Senators =

American Hockey League team in Belleville, Ontario

- City: Belleville, Ontario, Canada
- League: American Hockey League
- Conference: Eastern
- Division: North
- Founded: 1972
- Home arena: CIBC Place
- Colours: Red, black, white
- Owner: Michael Andlauer
- General manager: Matt Turek
- Head coach: Andrew Campbell
- Captain: Scott Harrington
- Media: AHL.TV (Internet); CJBQ
- Affiliates: Ottawa Senators (NHL) Allen Americans (ECHL)
- Website: Official website

Franchise history
- 1972–1992: New Haven Nighthawks
- 1992–1993: New Haven Senators
- 1993–1996: Prince Edward Island Senators
- 2002–2017: Binghamton Senators
- 2017–present: Belleville Senators

Championships
- Division titles: 1 (2019–20)

The Belleville Senators (colloquially known as the B-Sens) are a professional ice hockey team based in Belleville, Ontario, Canada. They are the American Hockey League (AHL) affiliate of the National Hockey League (NHL)'s Ottawa Senators. The Senators play their home games at CIBC Place. The franchise was previously based in Binghamton, New York, as the Binghamton Senators.

== History ==
In July 2016, Broome County officials stated that the Ottawa Senators intended to relocate their franchise, then known as the Binghamton Senators, closer to the parent club for the 2017–18 season despite still having three more years on their lease. On September 26, 2016, Ottawa Senators owner Eugene Melnyk confirmed that he had purchased the Binghamton team and would be relocating it to become the Belleville Senators for the 2017–18 season with the Binghamton Devils eventually announced to be taking over their lease. In order to accommodate an AHL team, the City of Belleville approved more than $20 million in upgrades to Yardmen Arena once the Senators agreed to an eight-year lease.

The Senators kept Kurt Kleinendorst as head coach for the franchise's inaugural season in Belleville, but after a 29–42–2–3 record and missing the playoffs, his contract was not renewed. He was replaced by Troy Mann, the recently released coach of the Hershey Bears. The team improved in the 2018–19 season, finishing in fifth place in the North Division behind the play of younger players Drake Batherson, Logan Brown, Rudolfs Balcers, and Erik Brannstrom.

Led by Josh Norris, Alex Formenton, and Drake Batherson, the B-Sens were leading the North Division when the 2019–20 season was cancelled on May 11 due to the COVID-19 pandemic. The team had amassed a 38–20–4–1 record and were the best road team in the league having won 23 games and a .790 road win percentage. The B-Sens' 234 goals were the most in the AHL.

The start for the following 2020–21 season was delayed due to the ongoing pandemic. In December 2020, the Senators agreed to a seven-year lease extension with the city of Belleville through the 2026–27 AHL season. In January 2021, the league announced a temporary realignment due to the pandemic border restrictions and the B-Sens were placed in an all-Canada division, but had no set start date due to venue usage and restrictions in the province of Ontario. The league eventually announced a start for the teams in Canada for one week after the rest of the league, but without any games initially scheduled in Ontario. The Belleville Senators started on the road before announcing their home games would be played in Ottawa at the Canadian Tire Centre for the entire season.

During the 2022–23 season, Belleville fired Troy Mann as coach on February 2, 2023, while sitting sixth in the AHL's North Division. Assistant coach David Bell was named new head coach.

After the departure of captain Dillon Heatherington in the offseason, on October 8, 2024, Belleville named Garrett Pilon the sixth captain in franchise history.

In August 2025, the City of Belleville and the Senators agreed to a three-year lease extension through the 2029–30 AHL season, with the option to extend the lease another five years up to 2034–35.

After going 11–14–3 to start the 2025–26 season, Belleville fired David Bell as head coach on December 17, 2025, while sitting fifth in the North Division. The Senators named assistant coach Andrew Campbell as interim head coach. The interim tag was lifted on June 22, 2026, when Campbell signed a three-year extension with Belleville.

On November 6, 2026, Belleville named Scott Harrington the seventh captain in franchise history.

== Broadcasting ==
The official broadcasting partner of the Belleville Senators is radio station 800 CJBQ. Commentators David Foot and Tim Durkin cover all games. David Foot also has a weekly podcast featuring news on the Belleville Senators and the AHL.

== Season-by-season results ==
| Calder Cup champions | Conference champions | Division champions | League leader |

| Regular season | | | | | | | | | | | Playoffs | | | | | |
| Season | Games | Won | Lost | OTL | SOL | Points | PCT | Goals for | Goals against | Standing | Year | Prelims | 1st round | 2nd round | 3rd round | Finals |
|---|---|---|---|---|---|---|---|---|---|---|---|---|---|---|---|---|
| 2017–18 | 76 | 29 | 42 | 2 | 3 | 63 | .414 | 194 | 266 | 6th, North | 2018 | Did not qualify | | | | |
| 2018–19 | 76 | 37 | 31 | 3 | 5 | 82 | .539 | 228 | 228 | 5th, North | 2019 | Did not qualify | | | | |
| 2019–20 | 63 | 38 | 20 | 4 | 1 | 81 | .643 | 234 | 197 | 1st, North | 2020 | Season cancelled due to the COVID-19 pandemic | | | | |
| 2020–21 | 35 | 18 | 16 | 1 | 0 | 37 | .529 | 102 | 111 | 3rd, Canadian | 2021 | No playoffs were held | | | | |
| 2021–22 | 72 | 40 | 28 | 4 | 0 | 84 | .583 | 219 | 218 | 4th, North | 2022 | L, 0–2, ROC | — | — | — | — |
| 2022–23 | 72 | 31 | 31 | 6 | 4 | 72 | .500 | 233 | 258 | 7th, North | 2023 | Did not qualify | | | | |
| 2023–24 | 72 | 38 | 28 | 3 | 3 | 82 | .569 | 209 | 211 | 4th, North | 2024 | W, 2–1, TOR | L, 1–3, CLE | — | — | — |
| 2024–25 | 72 | 34 | 27 | 6 | 5 | 79 | .549 | 206 | 223 | 6th, North | 2025 | Did not qualify | | | | |
| 2025–26 | 72 | 28 | 35 | 8 | 1 | 65 | .451 | 223 | 262 | 7th, North | 2026 | Did not qualify | | | | |
| Totals | 610 | 293 | 258 | 37 | 22 | 645 | .529 | 1,848 | 1,974 | | | 2 playoff appearances | | | | |

== Players ==
=== Current roster ===
Updated November 10, 2026.

| No. | Nat | Player | Pos | S/G | Age | Acquired | Birthplace | Contract |
|---|---|---|---|---|---|---|---|---|
| 2 | (Canada) | Matthew Andonovski | D | L | 21 | 2025 | Markham, Ontario | Ottawa |
| 17 | (Norway) | Eskild Bakke Olsen | C | R | 24 | 2026 | Hamar, Norway | Ottawa |
| 58 | (Canada) | Samuel Bolduc | D | L | 25 | 2026 | Laval, Quebec | Ottawa |
| 16 | (United States) | Tyler Boucher | LW | R | 23 | 2022 | Scottsdale, Arizona | Ottawa |
| 13 | (Canada) | Xavier Bourgault | C | R | 24 | 2024 | L'Islet, Quebec | Ottawa |
| 51 | (Canada) | Shane Bowers (PTO) | C | L | 27 | 2026 | Halifax, Nova Scotia | Belleville |
| 10 | (Canada) | Philippe Daoust (A) | LW | L | 25 | 2022 | Barrie, Ontario | Ottawa |
| 11 | (Canada) | Jorian Donovan | D | L | 22 | 2023 | Calgary, Alberta | Ottawa |
| 8 | (Canada) | Mark Duarte (PTO) | RW | R | 24 | 2025 | Hamilton, Ontario | Belleville |
| 28 | (Sweden) | Gabriel Eliasson | D | L | 20 | 2026 | Kungsbacka, Sweden | Ottawa |
| 29 | (Canada) | Luke Ellinas | LW | L | 20 | 2025 | Etobicoke, Ontario | Ottawa |
| 12 | (Finland) | Kasper Halttunen | RW | R | 21 | 2026 | Helsinki, Finland | Ottawa |
| 9 | (Czech Republic) | Tomas Hamara | D | L | 22 | 2024 | Prague, Czech Republic | Ottawa |
| 14 | (Canada) | Scott Harrington (C) | D | L | 33 | 2025 | Kingston, Ontario | Belleville |
| 30 | (Sweden) | Jonas Johansson | G | L | 31 | 2026 | Gavle, Sweden | Ottawa |
| 15 | (Canada) | Christian Kyrou | D | R | 23 | 2026 | Komoka, Ontario | Ottawa |
| 23 | (Canada) | Kurtis MacDermid | LW | L | 32 | 2026 | Quebec City, Quebec | Ottawa |
| 47 | (United States) | Blake Montgomery | LW | L | 21 | 2026 | Annapolis, Maryland | Ottawa |
| 32 | (Sweden) | Oskar Pettersson | RW | R | 22 | 2024 | Halmstad, Sweden | Ottawa |
| 45 | (Sweden) | Kevin Reidler | G | L | 22 | 2026 | Gavle, Sweden | Ottawa |
| 5 | (Canada) | Hoyt Stanley | D | R | 21 | 2026 | West Vancouver, British Columbia | Ottawa |
| 6 | (Canada) | Ryan Suzuki | C | L | 25 | 2026 | London, Ontario | Ottawa |
| 44 | (Canada) | Djibril Toure | D | R | 23 | 2023 | Dorval, Quebec | Ottawa |

=== Team captains ===
- Mike Blunden, 2017–18
- Erik Burgdoerfer, 2018–19
- Jordan Szwarz, 2019–20
- Logan Shaw, 2021–22
- Dillon Heatherington, 2022–24
- Garrett Pilon, 2024–26
- Scott Harrington, 2026–present

=== Team scoring leaders ===
Note: Pos = Position; GP = Games played; G = Goals; A = Assists; Pts = Points; P/G = Points per game average;

Points
| Player | Pos | GP | G | A | Pts | P/G |
|---|---|---|---|---|---|---|
| Egor Sokolov | LW | 240 | 76 | 104 | 180 | 0.75 |
| Angus Crookshank | LW | 202 | 77 | 72 | 149 | 0.74 |
| Cole Reinhardt | LW | 270 | 54 | 77 | 131 | 0.49 |
| Garrett Pilon | C | 186 | 37 | 89 | 126 | 0.68 |
| Lassi Thomson | D | 257 | 38 | 80 | 118 | 0.46 |
| Drake Batherson | RW | 103 | 38 | 78 | 116 | 1.13 |
| Maxence Guenette | D | 236 | 27 | 89 | 116 | 0.49 |
| Jake Lucchini | LW | 133 | 39 | 65 | 104 | 0.78 |
| Filip Chlapik | C | 146 | 37 | 51 | 88 | 0.60 |
| Roby Jarventie | LW | 136 | 38 | 48 | 86 | 0.63 |

=== Notable alumni ===
The following players have played both 100 games for the Belleville Senators and 100 games in the National Hockey League:

- Drake Batherson
- Jacob Bernard-Docker
- Andreas Englund
- Mark Kastelic
- Parker Kelly
- Jacob Larsson
- Nick Paul
