= Josh Norris =

American ice hockey player (born 1999)

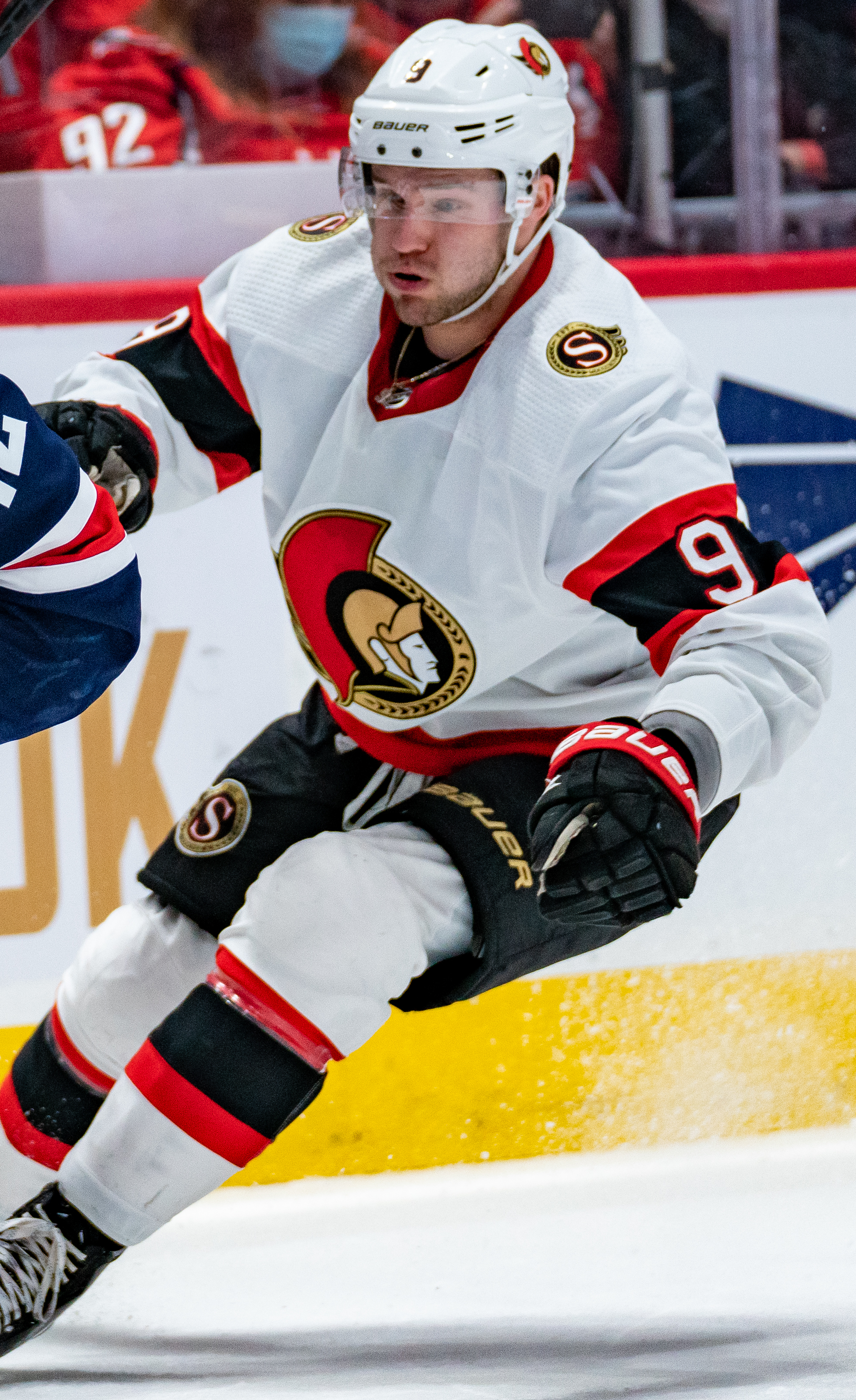
- Norris with the Ottawa Senators in 2022
- Born: May 5, 1999 (age 27) Oxford, Michigan, U.S.
- Height: 6 ft 2 in (188 cm)
- Weight: 196 lb (89 kg; 14 st 0 lb)
- Position: Center
- Shoots: Left
- NHL team Former teams: Buffalo Sabres; Ottawa Senators
- NHL draft: 19th overall, 2017; San Jose Sharks
- Playing career: 2019–present

Joshua Norris (born May 5, 1999) is an American professional ice hockey player who is a center for the Buffalo Sabres of the National Hockey League (NHL). He was drafted in the first round of the 2017 NHL entry draft by the San Jose Sharks and in 2018 was traded to the Ottawa Senators as part of a package for All-Star defenseman Erik Karlsson.

== Playing career ==
=== Amateur ===
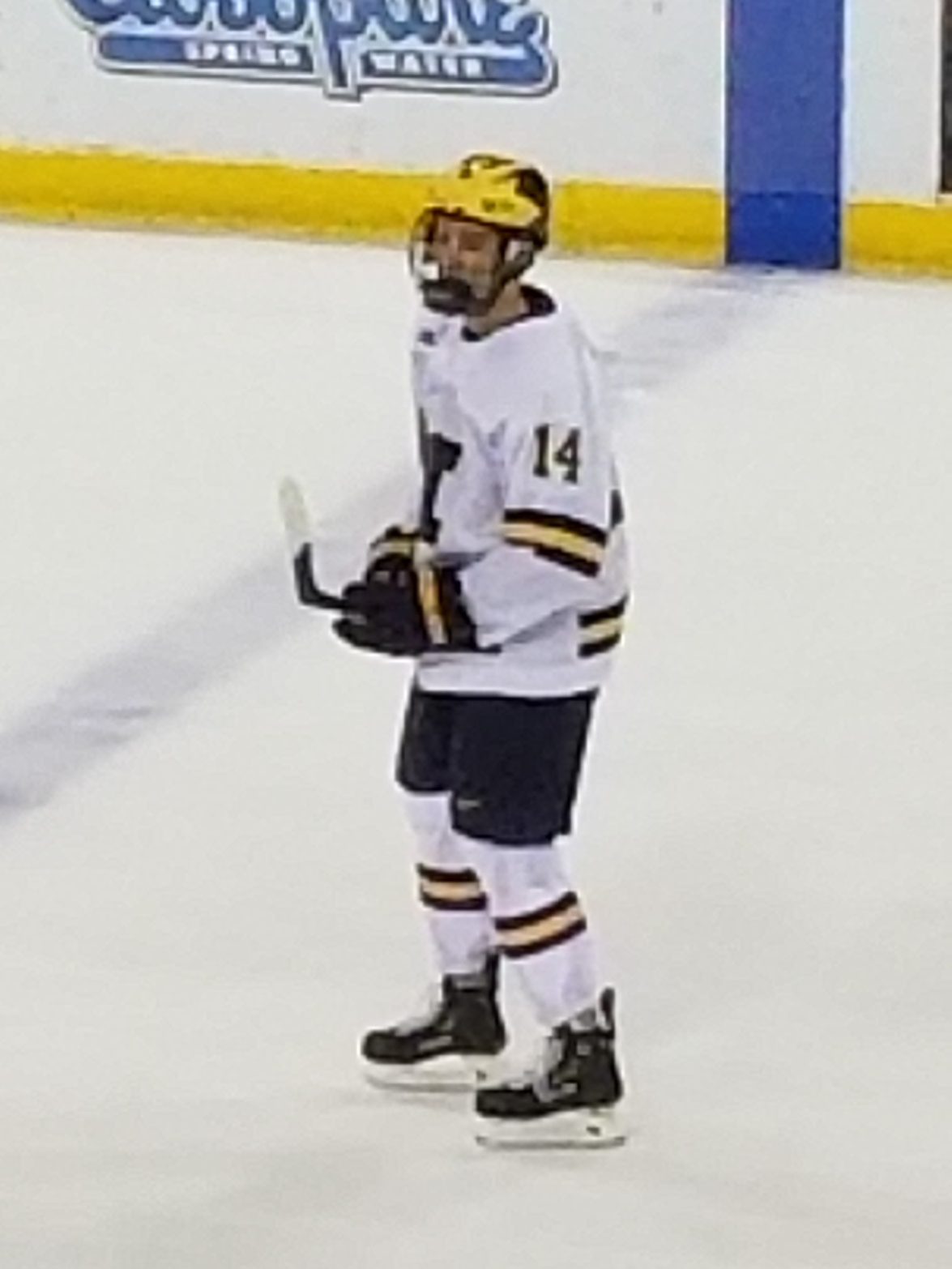
Norris playing with the Michigan Wolverines in October 2018

Norris first played midget hockey with the Oakland Jr. Grizzlies before gaining the attention of the U.S. National Development Team. He joined Team USA in the United States Hockey League (USHL) for two seasons beginning in 2015–16 season with the under-17 team, appearing in 24 games, recording two goals and five assists for seven points. Norris committed to play college hockey with the Michigan Wolverines of the National Collegiate Athletic Association (NCAA) on September 21, 2016. He graduated to the under-18 team in the USHL, in the 2016–17 season, playing in 25 games, scoring 12 goals and 26 points.

He joined Michigan for 2017–18 season and in his freshman year, Michigan advanced to the Frozen Four, losing their semifinal matchup against the Notre Dame Fighting Irish. In his first NCAA season, he tallied eight goals and 23 points in 37 games. He returned to Michigan for his sophomore year, centering the team's top line alongside Jake Slaker and Will Lockwood for the 2018–19 season. However, on January 17, 2019, it was announced that Norris would miss the remainder of the due to an injury sustained during the 2019 World Junior Ice Hockey Championships. He finished the season with ten goals and nine assists in 17 games. His ten goals were tied for a team-high and ranked second in points behind teammate Quinn Hughes. Norris' ten goals were tied for seventh-most in the nation and third-most in the Big Ten Conference.

=== Professional ===
On June 23, 2017, Norris was selected by the San Jose Sharks of the National Hockey League (NHL) in the first round, 19th overall, of the 2017 NHL entry draft. He was traded to the Ottawa Senators on September 13, 2018, as part of a package that brought All-Star defenseman Erik Karlsson to the Sharks. On May 27, 2019, Norris decided to leave college early and signed a three-year, entry-level contract with the Senators. His recovery from the serious shoulder injury suffered at the 2019 World Junior Championships took until June. Norris was assigned to Ottawa's American Hockey League (AHL) affiliate, the Belleville Senators, during the team's 2019 training camp. His 58 points in 51 games in the 2019–20 season earned him a promotion to Ottawa and he played his NHL debut on February 22, 2020, against the Montreal Canadiens. He made three appearances with Ottawa, going scoreless, before being returned to the AHL on February 23 alongside Drake Batherson. However, his return was short as the AHL announced the pause of play on March 12 due to the COVID-19 pandemic and later the season's cancellation on May 11. He finished the season with 31 goals and 61 points in 56 games. Norris was named to the AHL's All-Rookie Team and First All-Star Team for the 2019–20 season. He also won the league's Dudley "Red" Garrett Memorial Award as the top rookie.

Norris remained with Ottawa for the pandemic-delayed 2020–21 season. Norris recorded his first NHL point in the home opener on January 15, 2021, assisting on Thomas Chabot's first period goal in a 5–3 victory over the Toronto Maple Leafs. He scored his first goal on January 19 against Laurent Brossoit of the Winnipeg Jets. He appeared in 56 games, scoring 17 goals and 35 points. Norris capped off his rookie season by finishing top three in rookie point scoring as well as finishing second in goals scored behind only the eventual Calder Trophy winner Kirill Kaprizov. On June 29, it was announced that Norris had been selected for the NHL All-Rookie Team.

In the following 2021–22 season, he appeared in 66 games with Ottawa, scoring 35 goals and 55 points, leading the team in goals and third in points. Norris recorded a three-point night on December 14, 2021, scoring two goals and assisting on Drake Batherson's third period goal in an 8–2 victory over the Florida Panthers. He marked a second three-point night on March 8, 2022, scoring one goal and assisting on goals by Tim Stützle and Brady Tkachuk in a 4–1 win over the St. Louis Blues. On April 3, Norris recorded his first NHL hat trick, scoring three goals in a 5–2 victory over the Detroit Red Wings. In the 2022 offseason, Norris signed an eight-year, $63.6 million contract with Ottawa.

Five games into the 2022–23 season, Norris suffered a shoulder injury, causing him to miss three months. Despite initial fears that the injury would sideline him for the remainder of the season, Norris was able to return to the Senators in January 2023; however, he re-injured the shoulder after three games, necessitating surgery and ending his season. He played in eight games that season, scoring one goal and three points. Norris returned to Ottawa healthy for training camp ahead of the 2023–24 season, but tweaked something and missed the first three games of the season. He made his season debut on October 18, scoring two goals in a 6–1 win over the Washington Capitals. He appeared in 50 games, scoring 16 goals and 30 points before suffering another injury to his shoulder in a February 27, 2024, game against the Nashville Predators. He underwent surgery and missed the remainder of the season. Norris opened the 2024–25 season healthy and recorded a three-point night on October 14, scoring two goals (including the game winner) and assisting on another by Batherson in an 8–7 overtime victory over the Los Angeles Kings. In 53 games with Ottawa, he tallied 20 goals and 33 points.

On March 7, 2025, Norris was traded to the Buffalo Sabres along with defenseman Jacob Bernard-Docker in exchange for forward Dylan Cozens, defenseman Dennis Gilbert, and a 2026 second-round pick. He made his Sabres debut on March 8 in a 4–0 loss to the Florida Panthers. In his second game with the Sabres on March 10, he recorded his first point with the Sabres, assisting on Tage Thompson's game winning goal in a 3–2 win over the Edmonton Oilers, ending the team's six game losing skid. In his third game, on March 12, he scored his first goal in a 7–3 loss to the Red Wings. Norris then missed the final 18 games of the season after being sidelined with a torn oblique muscle that he had initially suffered on February 1 while still with the Senators.

In his first full season with Buffalo in 2025–26, he struggled with injuries again. He suffered an upper body injury opening night and missed 24 games. He was then injured twice more, the second time was another upper body injury causing him to miss 12 games. However, when he was playing, he was an offensive leader for the team. In 44 games, he scored 13 goals and 34 points. The Sabres won the Atlantic Division and made the playoffs for the first time in 14 seasons and faced the Boston Bruins in the first round. Norris played the first two games of the series before going down with an injury again. Norris returned to the lineup to score his first playoff goal for the Sabres in route to eliminating the Bruins. They moved on to face the Montreal Canadiens in the next round. Ultimately, the Canadiens beat the Sabres in the series to knock them out of the playoffs. In ten playoff games, Norris scored the one goal and three points.

== International play ==
Medal record

Men's ice hockey

Representing the United States

World Junior Championships
Silver medal – second place	2019 Canada	
Bronze medal – third place	2018 United States	

IIHF World U18 Championship
Gold medal – first place	2017 Slovakia	

Norris competed at the 2017 IIHF World U18 Championships where he helped Team USA win a gold medal. The following year, Norris was named to Team USA to compete at the 2018 World Junior Ice Hockey Championships. He played in all seven games on the way to a bronze medal. Following Team USA's 4–2 defeat to Sweden in the semifinals, Norris was named U.S. Player of the Game.

On December 23, 2018, Norris was selected to compete at the 2019 World Junior Ice Hockey Championships, and was later named an alternate captain alongside Michigan Wolverines' teammate Quinn Hughes. He appeared in all seven of the team's seven games and finished fourth in team scoring with three goals and six points. Team USA advanced to the championship final, but lost to Finland to earn the silver medal. Norris scored to tie the game at two in third period before Kaapo Kakko responded to win the game.

== Personal life ==
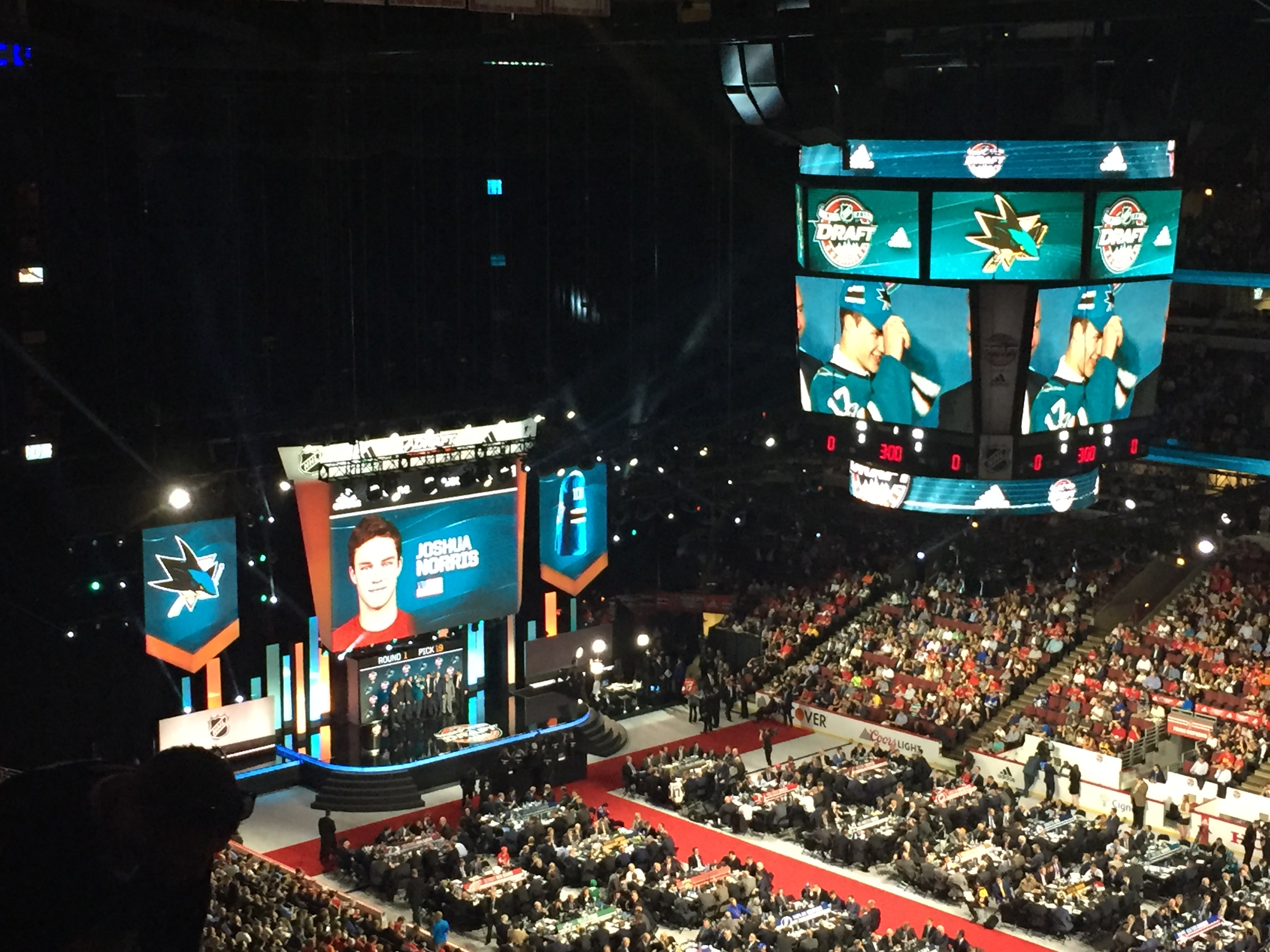
Norris selected by the San Jose Sharks at the 2017 NHL entry draft.

Norris is the son of Canadian former NHL player Dwayne Norris and his American wife Traci. Josh spent much of his first 11 years growing up in Germany, where his father played professionally, and he speaks fluent German. The family returned to the United States after the 2009-10 season and settled in Oxford, Michigan, where his father was his coach in youth hockey.

Norris is a good friend of former Ottawa Senators teammate Brady Tkachuk. The two played together on USNTDP teams and in the world junior championships.

Norris and Quinn Hughes were also both on USNTDP teams together, and college roommates for two years at the University of Michigan. Hughes had previously described Norris as his best friend in news reports, but in November 2024 Hughes also received his first-ever game-misconduct and ejection from a hockey game for cross-checking Norris from behind in a game between Ottawa and Vancouver.

== Career statistics ==
=== Regular season and playoffs ===
			Regular season					Playoffs
Season	Team	League	GP	G	A	Pts	PIM	GP	G	A	Pts	PIM
2015–16	U.S. National Development Team	USHL	24	2	5	7	16	—	—	—	—	—
2016–17	U.S. National Development Team	USHL	25	12	14	26	18	—	—	—	—	—
2017–18	University of Michigan	B1G	37	8	15	23	24	—	—	—	—	—
2018–19	University of Michigan	B1G	17	10	9	19	10	—	—	—	—	—
2019–20	Belleville Senators	AHL	56	31	30	61	21	—	—	—	—	—
2019–20	Ottawa Senators	NHL	3	0	0	0	0	—	—	—	—	—
2020–21	Ottawa Senators	NHL	56	17	18	35	13	—	—	—	—	—
2021–22	Ottawa Senators	NHL	66	35	20	55	16	—	—	—	—	—
2022–23	Ottawa Senators	NHL	8	2	1	3	6	—	—	—	—	—
2023–24	Ottawa Senators	NHL	50	16	14	30	22	—	—	—	—	—
2024–25	Ottawa Senators	NHL	53	20	13	33	34	—	—	—	—	—
2024–25	Buffalo Sabres	NHL	3	1	1	2	10	—	—	—	—	—
2025–26	Buffalo Sabres	NHL	44	13	21	34	28	10	1	2	3	6
NHL totals			283	104	88	192	129	10	1	2	3	6

=== International ===
Year	Team	Event	Result	GP	G	A	Pts	PIM
2015	United States	U17	6th	5	2	3	5	4
2017	United States	U18	1st place, gold medalist(s)	7	3	4	7	2
2018	United States	WJC	3rd place, bronze medalist(s)	7	0	3	3	2
2019	United States	WJC	2nd place, silver medalist(s)	7	3	3	6	4
Junior totals				26	8	13	21	12

== Awards and honors ==
Award	Year
AHL
All-Rookie Team	2020
First All-Star Team	2020
Dudley "Red" Garrett Memorial Award	2020
NHL
All-Rookie Team	2021

Awards and achievements
Preceded by Timo Meier	San Jose Sharks first-round draft pick 2017	Succeeded by Ryan Merkley
