= 2022–23 Coachella Valley Firebirds season =

Hockey team season

2022–23 Coachella Valley Firebirds
- Western Conference champions
- League: 2nd AHL
- Division: 2nd Pacific
- Conference: 2nd Western
- 2022–23 record: 48–17–5–2 (103 pts)
- Home record: 26–7–1–2
- Road record: 22–10–4–0
- Goals for: 257
- Goals against: 194

Team information
- General manager: Troy Bodie (de facto - VP of Hockey Operations)
- Coach: Dan Bylsma
- Captain: Max McCormick
- Alternate captains: Gustav Olofsson; Andrew Poturalski
- Arena: Acrisure Arena
- Average attendance: 7,478

Team leaders
- Goals: Kole Lind (30)
- Assists: Brogan Rafferty (42)
- Points: Max McCormick (67)
- Penalty minutes: Ian McKinnon (102)
- Wins: Joey Daccord (26)
- Goals against average: Shane Starrett (1.00)

The 2022–23 Coachella Valley Firebirds season was the franchise's inaugural season in the American Hockey League (AHL), starting on October 16, 2022, and ending on June 21, 2023, after they were eliminated in game seven of the Calder Cup finals. They played their home games at Acrisure Arena.

On March 15, 2023, the Firebirds clinched a playoff berth for the first time in franchise history after a 4–1 win against the Iowa Wild. The Firebirds went to the Calder Cup final, losing in game seven to the Hershey Bears.

== Background ==
Starting in 2018, the National Hockey League (NHL) had begun making plans for acquiring a minor league affiliate in the AHL for the NHL's new expansion team, the Seattle Kraken. On June 26, 2019, it was reported that Palm Springs would be the site of Seattle's new AHL affiliate. The expansion franchise was approved by the AHL board of governors on September 30, 2019. Delays associated with building a new arena caused play to be pushed back to the 2022–23 season. In the meantime, Seattle affiliated with the Charlotte Checkers for the 2021–22 season, sharing the team with the Florida Panthers.

== Off-season ==
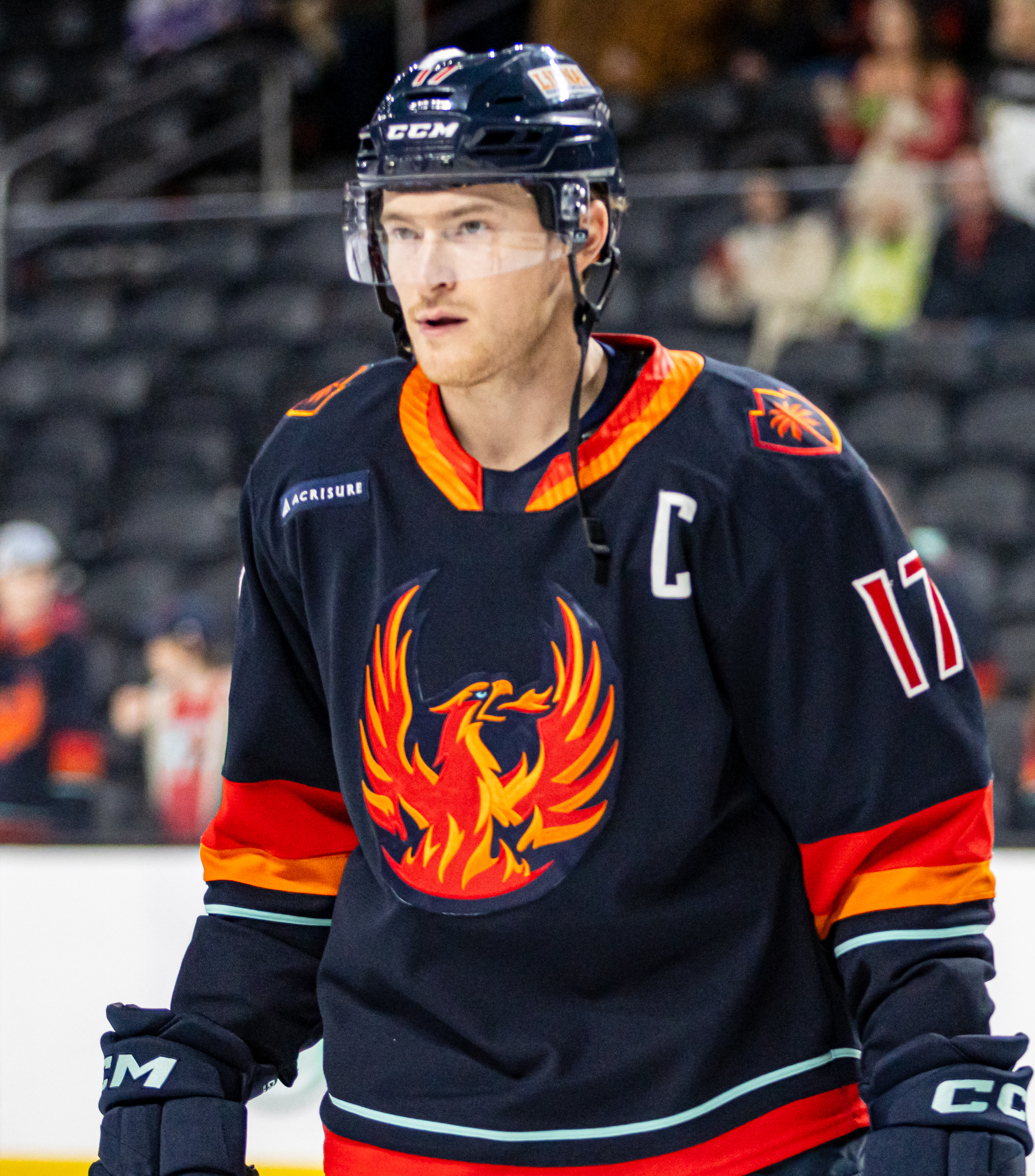
Inaugural Firebirds captain Max McCormick.

Over the off-season, the Firebirds signed many contracts with their to-be inaugural season players. Notable signings include Matt Tennyson, Jimmy Schuldt, and Eddie Wittchow.

On June 21, 2022, Dan Bylsma was named the Firebirds' inaugural head coach, after serving as an assistant coach the previous season with the Checkers. On the day of the Firebirds' first game, October 16, it announced that the team's inaugural captain would be Max McCormick, with alternate captains being Andrew Poturalski and Gustav Olofsson.

== Regular season ==
=== October ===
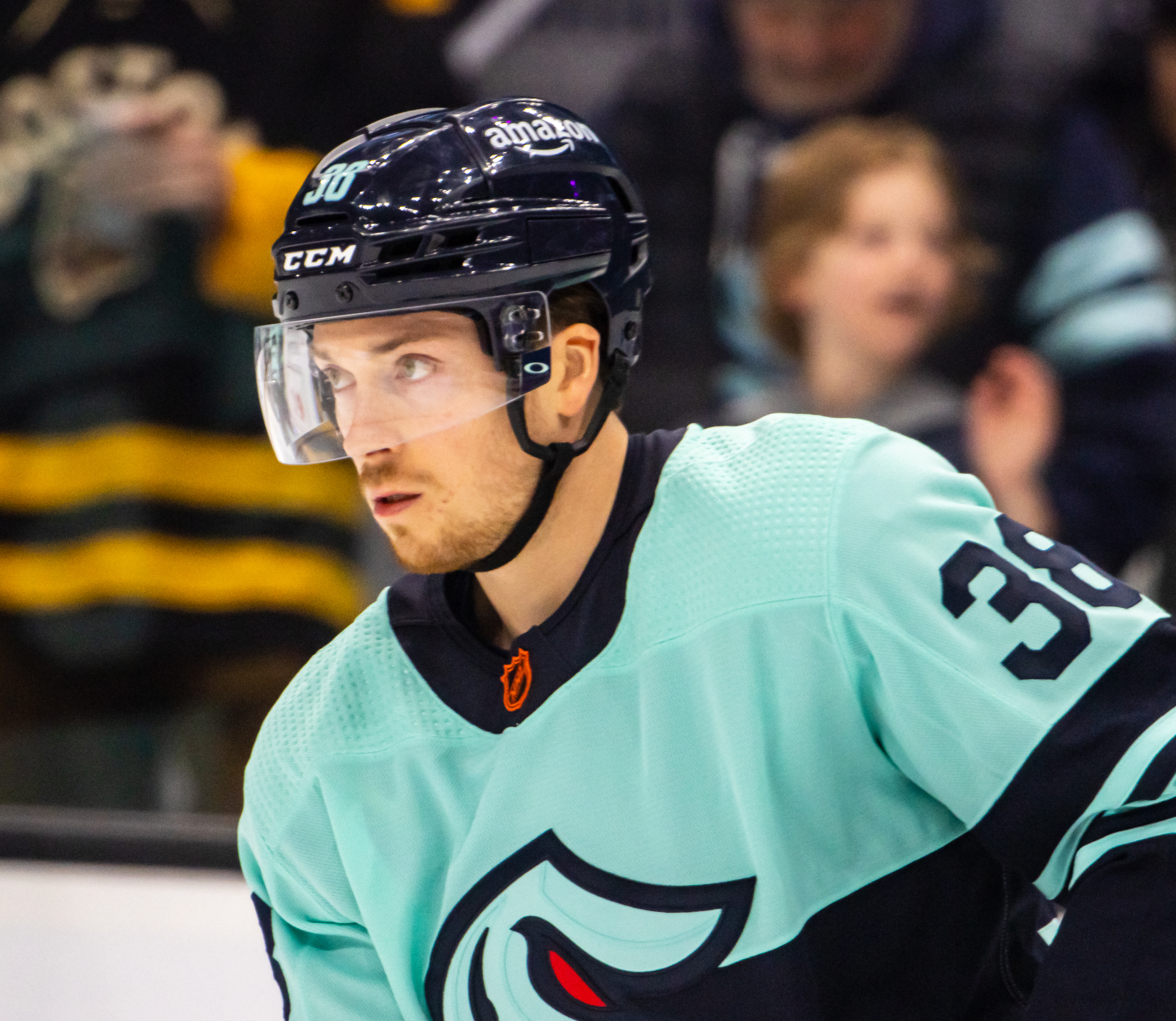
Jesper Froden, pictured here with the Seattle Kraken, was named the AHL Player of the Month for the month of October.

The Firebirds started their season with a two-game road trip against the Calgary Wranglers on October 16 and 17, winning both games. The Firebirds then started a series of "home" games in Seattle and Everett, WA, playing games against the Abbotsford Canucks and the Calgary Wranglers at the Kraken Community Iceplex, Climate Pledge Arena, and Angel of the Winds Arena on October 21, 23, 28, and 29. In the October 29 game, goaltender Callum Booth stopped 38 out of 41 shots, achieving his first and only win with the Firebirds. Jesper Froden was named the AHL Player of the Month for the month of October, with eleven points in six games with the Firebirds.

=== November ===
Coachella Valley would embark on a 16-game road trip throughout November 4 to December 16. The road trip started on October 4, with a 3–2 loss to the Abbotsford Canucks, with a 3–1 win to the Canucks the next day. In said win, forward Kole Lind attained the first hat-trick in franchise history, and goaltender Shane Starrett would make his only appearance of the season stopping 19 of 20 shots. The following game, a 4–1 win on November 11 against the Tucson Roadrunners, would see the Firebirds shoot a franchise record 38 shots-on-goal (SOG). The next day, Andrew Poturalski would score the game-winning goal in the franchise's first overtime win, a 4–3 win against Tucson.

The Firebirds would then face their first two franchise overtime losses, both to the Colorado Eagles, on November 18 and 19. The Firebirds would then lose the 5–3 to the Wranglers on November 22. Shane Wright, playing in his first Firebirds game after being loaned from the Kraken, scored his first professional goal. Coachella Valley would avenge the loss with a five-game win streak. The first win would come on November 24, with a 4–3 score, with the game-winning-goal being scored off the stick of Cameron Hughes off a pass from Brogan Rafferty with only 6.3 seconds left in the game. Two days later, on November 26, the Firebirds would achieve a 4–1 victory over the San Diego Gulls.

=== December ===
The Firebirds would start December by continuing their win streak. On December 2, goaltender Joey Daccord would record a 1–0 shutout against the Henderson Silver Knights, the lone goal being scored by Austin Poganski with 5:17 remaining in the third period. The next day, Andrew Poturalski would secure the first shootout win in franchise history, 3–2 win against the Silver Knights. On December 9, Kole Lind's second hat-trick of the season would help the Firebirds to an 8–3 win over the San Jose Barracuda. The Firebirds' winning streak would end in December 10, with a 5–4 overtime loss to the Bakersfield Condors. They would lose again on December 13, with a 7–2 loss to the Tucson Roadrunners, with the Roadrunners scoring 5 power-play goals. The next day, the Firebirds would avenge their loss with a 4–3 comeback win against Tucson, with Carsen Twarynski, Alexander True, and Ryker Evans scoring goals in the third period. The Firebirds would finish their road trip on December 16, with an 8–1 win over the San Diego Gulls, with Jesper Froden achieving a hat-trick.

The Firebirds would play their first ever game at Acrisure Arena in front of a sellout crowd of 10,087 people on December 18, notching a 4–3 win over the Roadrunners. Cameron Hughes would score the first ever goal at Acrisure Arena, at the 8:49 mark of the first period. The Firebirds would get their first loss at Acrisure Arena on December 20, with a 3–2 loss to Tucson. The Firebirds would then embark on a franchise record 14-game point streak from December 22 to January 26. They would start with a 3–2 shootout win at Henderson, in captain Max McCormick's 500th professional game. It would be McCormick himself who scored the shootout-winning goal. On December 23, the Firebirds' teddy bear toss night. Joey Daccord would again achieve a 1–0 shutout over the Silver Knights. With 6:23 left in the game, Luke Henman would score the game's only goal, sending 7,278 stuffed animals onto the ice. On December 28, the Firebirds would get a 7–6 comeback win over the Ontario Reign, with Andrew Poturalski scoring the game-winning goal with 1:09 left in regulation time. On December 30, goaltender Christopher Gibson would make 24 saves to record a 4–0 shutout against San Jose.

=== January ===
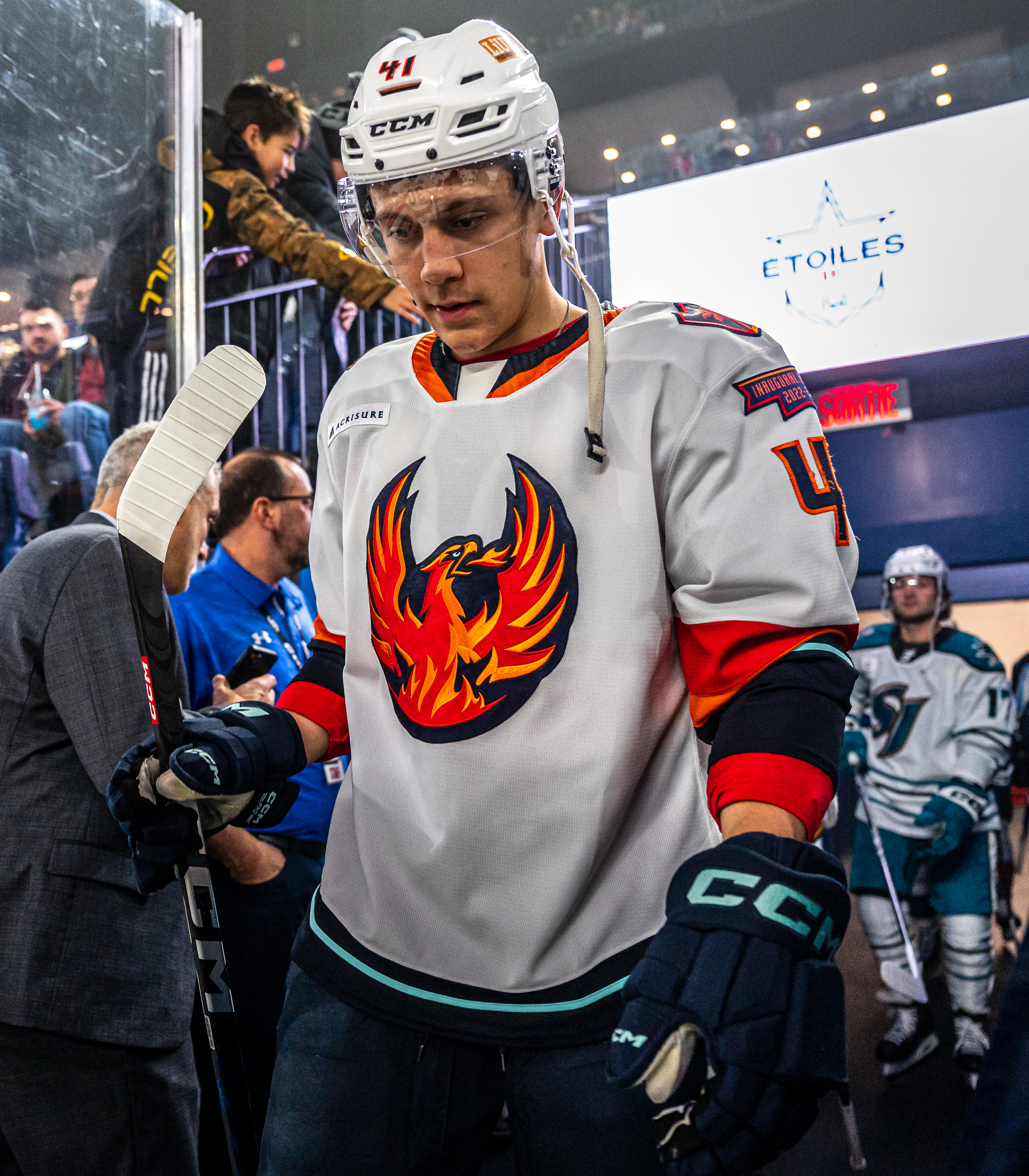
Ryker Evans

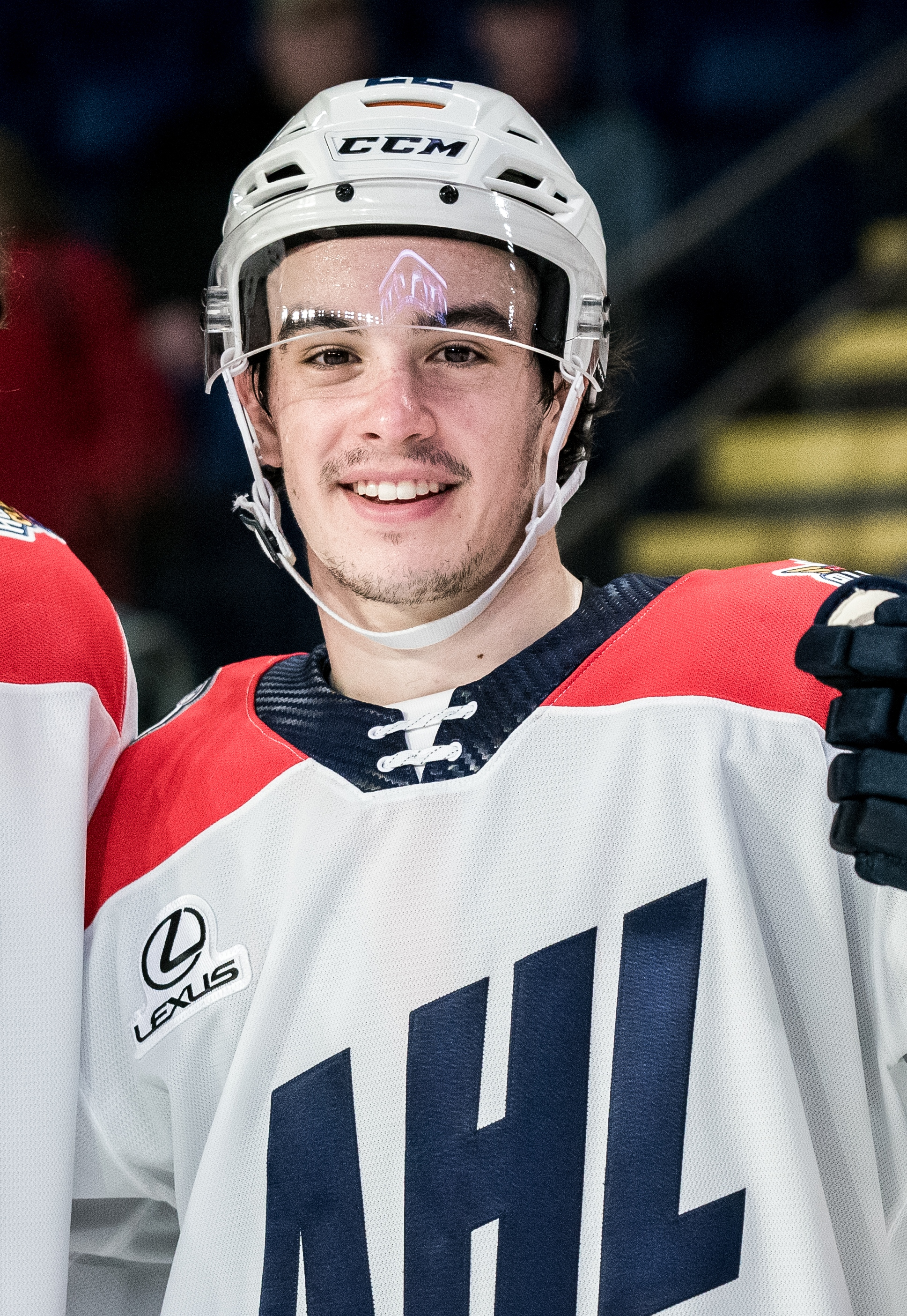
Andrew Poturalski

Ryker Evans and Andrew Poturalski were selected for the 2023 AHL All-Star Classic.

The Firebirds would come into the new year with a 4–2 win against the Colorado Eagles on January 4, 2023. On January 7, Joey Daccord would get his third shutout of the season in a 4–0 win against the San Jose Barracuda, stopping 39 shots. The only defect in the Firebirds' point streak would come in a 3–2 shootout loss to the Ontario Reign on January 8, with the Reign putting up 50 shots-on-goal. On January 10, the Firebirds would display a 3–2 shootout win against the Barracuda, with Daccord stopping all seven of the Barracuda's shootout attempts. Kole Lind would score the game-winning-goal.

On January 11, the AHL announced the rosters for the 2023 AHL All-Star Classic. Representing Coachella Valley were Ryker Evans and Andrew Poturalski.

The Firebirds would continue their winning streak with Max McCormick scoring the overtime winner against the Bakersfield Condors on January 13. In a 5–2 win to the Tucson Roadrunners on January 16 would see Jesper Froden record his second straight multi-goal game. McCormick would get a hat-trick including another overtime winner in a 5–4 overtime win to the Reign on January 21. Lind, Froden, and Cameron Hughes would score in the third period of a 4–2 comeback victory over the San Diego Gulls the next day. On January 26, Tye Kartye would score the overtime winner in a 3–2 win over the Iowa Wild. The Firebirds' winning streak would come to an end on January 28, in a 5–2 loss to the Wild. The Firebirds couldn't find their offensive touch, as players like McCormick and John Hayden were recalled by Seattle, and Poturalski was sidelined with an injury.

=== February ===
The Firebirds remained one of the AHL's hottest teams in February, posting a 7–2–0–1 record (4–1–0–0 home, 3–1–0–1 road) and outscoring opponents 35–22 over ten games. Highlights included a 5–1 road win at Abbotsford on February 17 and an 8–6 victory at Iowa on February 24, the latter tying the franchise record for most goals in a game at that point. Goaltender Joey Daccord continued his dominant play, going 8–2–1 on the season to date and earning praise as one of the league's top netminders.

=== March ===
The Firebirds had an outstanding March, going 10–2–1–0 (5–1–0–0 home, 5–1–1–0 road) and outscoring opponents 53–29 over 13 games. On March 15, a 4–1 road win over the Iowa Wild officially clinched the franchise's first-ever Calder Cup playoff berth. Forward Tye Kartye was named AHL Rookie of the Month for March after leading all rookies with 11 goals and 17 points in 15 games.

=== April ===
The Firebirds closed the regular season with a 4–1–0–1 record in April, finishing with a franchise-best 48–17–5–2 (105 points) and second place in the Pacific Division. On April 20, forward Tye Kartye was named recipient of the Dudley "Red" Garrett Memorial Award as the AHL's outstanding rookie for 2022–23, the first Firebirds player to win the honor.

== Standings ==
y– indicates team has clinched division and a playoff spot
x– indicates team has clinched a playoff spot
e– indicates team has been eliminated from playoff contention

=== Divisional standings ===
Pacific Division	GP	W	L	OTL	SOL	Pts	GF	GA
y–Calgary Wranglers (CGY)	72	51	17	3	1	106	256	174
x–Coachella Valley Firebirds (SEA)	72	48	17	5	2	103	257	194
x–Colorado Eagles (COL)	72	40	22	7	3	90	210	187
x–Abbotsford Canucks (VAN)	72	40	25	3	4	87	229	203
x–Bakersfield Condors (EDM)	72	37	31	2	2	78	212	212
x–Ontario Reign (LAK)	72	34	32	5	1	74	206	211
x–Tucson Roadrunners (ARI)	72	30	33	8	1	69	219	245
e–San Jose Barracuda (SJS)	72	31	34	2	5	69	205	249
e–Henderson Silver Knights (VGK)	72	29	38	0	5	63	201	221
e–San Diego Gulls (ANA)	72	20	49	2	1	43	180	281

=== Conference standings ===
Eastern Conference	Div	GP	W	L	OTL	SOL	Pts	GF	GA
y–Calgary Wranglers (CGY)	PA	72	51	17	3	1	106	256	174
x–Coachella Valley Firebirds (SEA)	PA	72	48	17	5	2	103	257	194
y–Texas Stars (DAL)	CE	72	40	20	9	3	92	265	210
x–Colorado Eagles (COL)	PA	72	40	22	7	3	90	210	187
x–Milwaukee Admirals (NSH)	CE	72	41	24	5	2	89	238	211
x–Abbotsford Canucks (VAN)	PA	72	40	25	3	4	87	229	203
x–Manitoba Moose (WPG)	CE	72	37	25	6	4	84	227	226
x–Iowa Wild (MIN)	CE	72	34	27	6	5	79	211	211
x–Rockford IceHogs (CHI)	CE	72	35	28	5	4	79	214	232
x–Bakersfield Condors (EDM)	PA	72	37	31	2	2	78	212	212
e–Chicago Wolves (CAR)	CE	72	35	29	5	3	78	227	245
x–Ontario Reign (LAK)	PA	72	34	32	5	1	74	206	211
x–Tucson Roadrunners (ARI)	PA	72	30	33	8	1	69	219	245
e–San Jose Barracuda (SJS)	PA	72	31	34	2	5	69	205	249
e–Grand Rapids Griffins (DET)	CE	72	28	36	4	4	64	194	255
e–Henderson Silver Knights (VGK)	PA	72	29	38	0	5	63	201	221
e–San Diego Gulls (ANA)	PA	72	20	49	2	1	43	180	281

Divisions: PA – Pacific, CE – Central

== Schedule and results ==
=== Regular season ===
The regular season schedule was released on July 21, 2022.

2022–23 Game Log – Regular season

October: 4–2–0–0 (Home: 2–2–0–0; Road: 2–0–0–0)
#	Date	Visitor	Score	Home	OT	Decision	Attendance	Record	Pts	Report
1	October 16	Coachella Valley	6–5	Calgary		Daccord	5,663	1–0–0–0	2	Report
2	October 17	Coachella Valley	3–1	Calgary		Daccord	2,922	2–0–0–0	4	Report
3	October 21^{[A]}	Abbotsford	4–3	Coachella Valley		Daccord	700	2–1–0–0	4	Report
4	October 23^{[B]}	Abbotsford	4–7	Coachella Valley		Gibson	8,724	3–1–0–0	6	Report
5	October 28^{[C]}	Calgary	6–4	Coachella Valley		Gibson	3,287	3–2–0–0	6	Report
6	October 29^{[A]}	Calgary	3–5	Coachella Valley		Booth	2,434	4–2–0–0	8	Report

November: 5–2–2–0 (Home: 0–0–0–0; Road: 5–2–2–0)
#	Date	Visitor	Score	Home	OT	Decision	Attendance	Record	Pts	Report
7	November 4	Coachella Valley	2–3	Abbotsford		Gibson	4,012	4–3–0–0	8	Report
8	November 5	Coachella Valley	3–1	Abbotsford		Starrett	3,992	5–3–0–0	10	Report
9	November 11	Coachella Valley	4–1	Tucson		Gibson	3,471	6–3–0–0	12	Report
10	November 12	Coachella Valley	4–3	Tucson	OT	Daccord	4,388	7–3–0–0	14	Report
11	November 18	Coachella Valley	1–2	Colorado	OT	Daccord	5,089	7–3–1–0	15	Report
12	November 19	Coachella Valley	2–3	Colorado	OT	Gibson	5,089	7–3–2–0	16	Report
13	November 22	Coachella Valley	3–5	Calgary		Daccord	2,698	7–4–2–0	16	Report
14	November 24	Coachella Valley	4–3	Calgary		Daccord	2,556	8–4–2–0	18	Report
15	November 26	Coachella Valley	4–1	San Diego		Daccord	5,695	9–4–2–0	20	Report

December: 10–2–1–1 (Home: 3–1–0–0; Road: 7–1–1–1)
#	Date	Visitor	Score	Home	OT	Decision	Attendance	Record	Pts	Report
16	December 2	Coachella Valley	1–0	Henderson		Daccord	4,326	10–4–2–0	22	Report
17	December 3	Coachella Valley	3–2	Henderson	SO	Gibson	5,117	11–4–2–0	24	Report
18	December 9	Coachella Valley	8–3	San Jose		Daccord	1,488	12–4–2–0	26	Report
19	December 10	Coachella Valley	4–5	Bakersfield	OT	Gibson	4,685	12–4–3–0	27	Report
20	December 13	Coachella Valley	2–7	Tucson		Daccord	2,217	12–5–3–0	27	Report
21	December 14	Coachella Valley	4–3	Tucson		Gibson	2,069	13–5–3–0	29	Report
22	December 16	Coachella Valley	8–1	San Diego		Daccord	5,327	14–5–3–0	31	Report
23	December 18	Tucson	3–4	Coachella Valley		Daccord	10,087	15–5–3–0	33	Report
24	December 20	Tucson	3–2	Coachella Valley		Daccord	6,487	15–6–3–0	33	Report
25	December 22	Coachella Valley	3–2	Henderson	SO	Gibson	4,598	16–6–3–0	35	Report
26	December 23	Henderson	0–1	Coachella Valley		Daccord	8,641	17–6–3–0	37	Report
27	December 28	Ontario	6–7	Coachella Valley		Daccord	10,087	18–6–3–0	39	Report
28	December 30	Coachella Valley	4–0	San Jose		Gibson	2,117	19–6–3–0	41	Report
29	December 31	Coachella Valley	4–1	San Jose		Daccord	1,839	20–6–3–0	43	Report

January: 8–1–0–1 (Home: 6–0–0–1; Road: 2–1–0–0)
#	Date	Visitor	Score	Home	OT	Decision	Attendance	Record	Pts	Report
30	January 4	Colorado	2–4	Coachella Valley		Daccord	7,044	21–6–3–0	45	Report
31	January 7	San Jose	0–4	Coachella Valley		Daccord	8,124	22–6–3–0	47	Report
32	January 8	Ontario	3–2	Coachella Valley	SO	Gibson	7,576	22–6–3–2	48	Report
33	January 10	San Jose	2–3	Coachella Valley	SO	Daccord	6,392	23–6–3–1	50	Report
34	January 13	Bakersfield	4–5	Coachella Valley	OT	Gibson	8,346	24–6–3–1	52	Report
35	January 16	Tucson	2–5	Coachella Valley		Daccord	7,022	25–6–3–1	54	Report
36	January 21	Coachella Valley	5–4	Ontario	OT	Daccord	9,619	26–6–3–1	56	Report
37	January 22	San Diego	2–4	Coachella Valley		Gibson	9,473	27–6–3–1	58	Report
38	January 26	Coachella Valley	3–2	Iowa	OT	Daccord	3,015	28–6–3–1	60	Report
39	January 28	Coachella Valley	2–5	Iowa		Daccord	7,003	28–7–3–1	60	Report

February: 6–2–1–1 (Home: 4–1–0–1; Road: 2–1–1–0)
#	Date	Visitor	Score	Home	OT	Decision	Attendance	Record	Pts	Report
40	February 3	San Diego	1–2	Coachella Valley		Daccord	7,882	29–7–3–1	62	Report
41	February 4	San Diego	0–4	Coachella Valley		Gibson	9,339	30–7–3–1	64	Report
42	February 10	Coachella Valley	1–2	San Diego	OT	Daccord	7,817	30–7–4–1	65	Report
43	February 15	Tucson	1–3	Coachella Valley		Daccord	7,332	31–7–4–1	67	Report
44	February 17	Coachella Valley	2–4	Ontario		Gibson	8,313	31–8–4–1	67	Report
45	February 18	Bakersfield	3–2	Coachella Valley		Daccord	9,088	31–9–4–1	67	Report
46	February 20	Ontario	3–2	Coachella Valley	SO	Daccord	7,508	31–9–4–2	68	Report
47	February 22	Coachella Valley	6–1	Ontario		Daccord	5,309	32–9–4–2	70	Report
48	February 24	Coachella Valley	5–2	San Diego		Gibson	6,942	33–9–4–2	72	Report
49	February 27	San Jose	3–4	Coachella Valley	OT	Driedger	6,349	34–9–4–2	74	Report

March: 10–5–0–0 (Home: 7–2–0–0; Road: 3–3–0–0)
#	Date	Visitor	Score	Home	OT	Decision	Attendance	Record	Pts	Report
50	March 1	Calgary	3–1	Coachella Valley		Driedger	7,711	34–10–4–2	74	Report
51	March 3	Coachella Valley	5–1	Bakersfield		Daccord	5,076	35–10–4–2	76	Report
52	March 4	Coachella Valley	5–4	San Jose		Driedger	2,867	36–10–4–2	78	Report
53	March 8	Henderson	3–6	Coachella Valley		Daccord	6,667	37–10–4–2	80	Report
54	March 11	Texas	4–2	Coachella Valley		Driedger	8,098	37–11–4–2	80	Report
55	March 12	Texas	3–6	Coachella Valley		Daccord	7,911	38–11–4–2	82	Report
56	March 15	Iowa	1–4	Coachella Valley		Driedger	7,211	39–11–4–2	84	Report
57	March 17	Iowa	1–3	Coachella Valley		Daccord	7,325	40-11-4-2	86	Report
58	March 19	San Diego	4–8	Coachella Valley		Driedger	7,793	41–11–4–2	88	Report
59	March 21	Coachella Valley	1–3	Texas		Gibson	4,068	41–12–4–2	88	Report
60	March 22	Coachella Valley	1–6	Texas		Driedger	4,118	41–13–4–2	88	Report
61	March 24	Coachella Valley	4–7	Henderson		Gibson	5,133	41–14–4–2	88	Report
62	March 25	Henderson	3–7	Coachella Valley		Driedger	8,352	42–14–4–2	90	Report
63	March 29	Bakersfield	1–5	Coachella Valley		Daccord	7,747	43–14–4–2	92	Report
64	March 31	Coachella Valley	4–0	Ontario		Driedger	7,948	44–14–4–2	94	Report

April: 4–3–1–0 (Home: 4–1–1–0; Road: 0–2–0–0)
#	Date	Visitor	Score	Home	OT	Decision	Attendance	Record	Pts	Gamesheet
65	April 1	Colorado	2–3	Coachella Valley	OT	Daccord	8,409	45–14–4–2	96	Report
66	April 3	San Jose	3–4	Coachella Valley	SO	Driedger	6,791	46–14–4–2	98	Report
67	April 5	Calgary	3–1	Coachella Valley		Daccord	8,206	46–15–4–2	98	Report
68	April 8	Bakersfield	1–2	Coachella Valley		Driedger	8,356	47–15–4–2	100	Report
69	April 9	Henderson	3–2	Coachella Valley	OT	Gibson	7,361	47–15–5–2	101	Report
70	April 12	Ontario	2–3	Coachella Valley		Driedger	9,332	48–15–5–2	103	Report
71	April 14	Coachella Valley	0–3	Bakersfield		Driedger	5,821	48–16–5–2	103	Report
72	April 15	Coachella Valley	2–4	Bakersfield		Daccord	6,671	48–17–5–2	103	Report

Legend: Win (2 points) Loss (0 points) Overtime/shootout loss (1-point)

Notes:
^{A} Indicates game played at Kraken Community Iceplex. ^{B} Indicates game played at Climate Pledge Arena. ^{C} Indicates game played at Angel of the Winds Arena.

=== Playoffs ===
2023 Game Log – Playoffs

Pacific Division First Round: vs. (13) Tucson Roadrunners – Firebirds win series 2–1
#	Date	Visitor	Score	Home	OT	Decision	Attendance	Series	Report
1	April 19	Tucson	1–5	Coachella Valley		Daccord	5,486	1–0	Report
2	April 21	Tucson	4–3	Coachella Valley		Daccord	7,168	1–1	Report
3	April 23	Tucson	1–5	Coachella Valley		Daccord	7,008	2–1	Report

Pacific Division Semifinal: vs. (4) Colorado Eagles – Firebirds win series 3–2
#	Date	Visitor	Score	Home	OT	Decision	Attendance	Series	Report
1	April 26	Coachella Valley	6–2	Colorado		Daccord	5,089	1–0	Report
2	April 27	Coahcella Valley	2–3	Colorado		Daccord	5,089	1–1	Report
3	April 30	Colorado	1–0	Coachella Valley	OT	Daccord	7,639	1–2	Report
4	May 3	Colorado	3–4	Coachella Valley		Daccord	7,343	2–2	Report
5	May 5	Colorado	0–5	Coachella Valley		Daccord	9,062	3–2	Report

Pacific Division Final: vs. (1) Calgary Wranglers – Firebirds win series 3–2
#	Date	Visitor	Score	Home	OT	Decision	Attendance	Series	Report
1	May 11	Coachella Valley	6–3	Calgary		Daccord	4,738	1–0	Report
2	May 12	Coahcella Valley	2–3	Calgary		Daccord	6,598	1–1	Report
3	May 15	Calgary	2–3	Coachella Valley	3OT	Daccord	8,198	2–1	Report
4	May 17	Calgary	1–0	Coachella Valley		Daccord	7,758	2–2	Report
5	May 5	Calgary	5–6	Coachella Valley	OT	Daccord	8,972	3–2	Report

Western Conference Final: vs. (5) Milwaukee Admirals – Firebirds win series 4–2
#	Date	Visitor	Score	Home	OT	Decision	Attendance	Series	Report
1	May 25	Milwaukee	4–6	Coachella Valley		Daccord	8,198	1–0	Report
2	May 27	Milwaukee	3–5	Coachella Valley		Daccord	10,087	2–0	Report
3	May 29	Coachella Valley	1–3	Milwaukee		Daccord	4,589	2–1	Report
4	June 1	Coachella Valley	2–5	Milwaukee		Daccord	4,456	2–2	Report
5	June 3	Coachella Valley	2–1	Milwaukee		Daccord	5,561	3–2	Report
6	June 5	Milwaukee	3–4	Coachella Valley		Daccord	10,087	3–2	Report

Calder Cup Final: vs. (2) Hershey Bears – Bears win series 4–3
#	Date	Visitor	Score	Home	OT	Decision	Attendance	Series	Report
1	June 8	Hershey	0–5	Coachella Valley		Daccord	10,087	1–0	Report
2	June 10	Hershey	0–4	Coachella Valley		Daccord	10,087	2–0	Report
3	June 13	Coachella Valley	4–5	Hershey	OT	Daccord	10,580	2–1	Report
4	June 5	Coachella Valley	2–3	Hershey		Daccord	10,687	2–2	Report
5	June 17	Coachella Valley	0–1	Hershey	OT	Daccord	10,869	2–3	Report
6	June 19	Hershey	2–5	Coachella Valley		Daccord	10,087	3–3	Report
7	June 21	Hershey	3–2	Coachella Valley	OT	Daccord	10,087	3–4	Report

Legend: Win Loss

== Player statistics ==
Updated as of April 28, 2024

=== Skaters ===
Note: GP = Games played; G = Goals; A = Assists; Pts = Points; +/− = Plus/minus; PIM = Penalty minutes

Regular season
Player	GP	G	A	Pts	+/−	PIM
Max McCormick	71	28	39	67	+15	76
Kole Lind	72	30	32	62	+11	91
Tye Kartye	72	28	29	57	+17	74
Cameron Hughes	61	19	37	56	+19	57
Brogan Rafferty	72	9	42	51	+28	42
Jesper Froden	44	25	22	47	+22	24
Ryker Evans	71	6	38	44	+19	74
Andrew Poturalski	38	11	31	42	+14	14
John Hayden	47	17	16	33	+10	58
Alexander True	72	11	21	32	+13	48
Jimmy Schuldt	71	8	24	31	+22	31
Ville Petman	72	12	16	28	+10	21
Austin Poganski	70	8	20	28	+14	30
Carsen Twarynski	71	17	9	26	+13	69
Matt Tennyson	71	0	18	18	+20	66
Luke Henman	67	7	8	15	+2	41
Jeremy McKenna	27	5	7	12	–3	6
Peetro Seppala	70	1	11	12	+13	51
Eddie Wittchow	56	4	5	9	+9	93
Shane Wright	8	4	2	6	+2	2
Gustav Olofsson	20	1	5	6	+9	8
Ian McKinnon	36	1	2	3	–3	102
David Goyette	2	0	0	0	–1	0
David Cotton^{†}	2	0	0	0	–2	0
Ville Ottavainen	2	0	0	0	0	0
Jake McLaughlin	2	0	0	0	+2	0
Luke Stevens	2	0	0	0	–1	2
Nick Pastujov	6	0	0	0	0	0
Tristan Mullin	15	0	0	0	–3	6

Playoffs
Player	GP	G	A	Pts	PIM
Kole Lind	26	9	22	31	16
Max McCormick	26	14	13	27	16
Ryker Evans	26	5	21	26	26
Cameron Hughes	26	4	19	23	6
Jeremy McKenna	18	6	6	12	8
Andrew Poturalski	16	3	9	12	6
Ville Petman	26	5	6	11	8
Brogan Rafferty	26	2	9	11	4
Jesper Froden	15	5	5	10	8
Shane Wright	24	2	7	9	2
Jimmy Schuldt	26	5	4	9	10
Carsen Twarynski	26	5	3	8	14
Tye Kartye	18	6	2	8	8
Gustav Olofsson	26	3	2	5	10
Luke Henman	13	2	3	5	2
Austin Poganski	24	2	2	4	10
Eddie Wittchow	26	3	0	3	14
Matt Tennyson	26	0	3	3	28
David Goyette	7	0	2	2	2
John Hayden	10	1	1	2	16
Nick Pastujov	6	0	0	0	2
Jacob Melanson	1	0	0	0	0
Jagger Firkus	1	0	0	0	0
Ian McKinnon	3	0	0	0	0

=== Goaltenders ===
Note: GP = Games played; TOI = Time on ice; W = Wins; L = Losses; GA = Goals against; GAA = Goals against average; SV = Saves; SA = Shots against; SV% = Save percentage; SO = Shutouts; G = Goals; A = Assists; PIM = Penalty minutes

Regular season
Player	GP	GS	TOI	W	L	OT	S/O	GA	GAA	SA	SV%	SO	G	A	PIM
Joey Daccord	38	37	2,269	26	8	2	1	90	2.38	1,010	.918	3	0	3	0
Christopher Gibson	20	19	1,105	10	5	3	1	55	2.99	465	.894	2	0	0	0
Chris Driedger	14	13	805	9	4	0	0	35	2.61	344	.908	1	0	0	0
Callum Booth	2	2	98	2	0	0	0	3	1.84	57	.950	0	0	0	0
Shane Starrett	1	1	60	1	0	0	0	1	1.00	19	.950	0	0	0	0

Playoffs
Player	GP	GS	TOI	W	L	GA	GAA	SA	SV%	SO	G	A	PIM
Joey Daccord	26	26	2,269	15	11	61	2.22	762	.926	3	0	3	2

^{†} Denotes player was traded mid-season. Stats reflect time with the Firebirds only.

== Transactions ==
The Firebirds have been involved in the following transactions during the 2022–23 season.

=== Trades ===
Date	Details		Ref
December 8, 2022	To San Diego Gulls David Cotton	To Coachella Valley Firebirds Future considerations	

=== Free agents acquired ===
Date	Player	Ref
July 11, 2022	Samuel Bucek	
July 11, 2022	Ian McKinnon	
September 1, 2022	Matt Tennyson	
September 22, 2022	David Cotton	
September 22, 2022	Jimmy Schuldt	
September 22, 2022	Eddie Wittchow	
September 27, 2022	Jeremy McKenna	
September 27, 2022	Tristan Mullin	
September 27, 2022	Jake McLaughlin	
September 27, 2022	Callum Booth	
September 29, 2022	Luke Stevens	
September 29, 2022	Nick Pastujov	
September 29, 2022	Pascal Laberge	
September 29, 2022	Hugo Roy	

=== Other signings ===
Date	Player	Ref
October 14, 2022	Christopher Gibson (PTO)	
November 2, 2022	Shane Starrett (PTO)	
March 30, 2023	Max Andreev (ATO)	

=== Other players lost ===
Date	Player	Team	Ref
October 22, 2022	Michal Kempny	HC Sparta Praha (ELH)	
October 27, 2022	Christopher Gibson	Seattle Kraken (NHL)	
February 2, 2023	Callum Booth	Löwen Frankfurt (DEL)	
June 22, 2023	Nick Pastujov	Pioneers Vorarlberg (ICEHL)	
