= List of Coachella Valley Firebirds players =

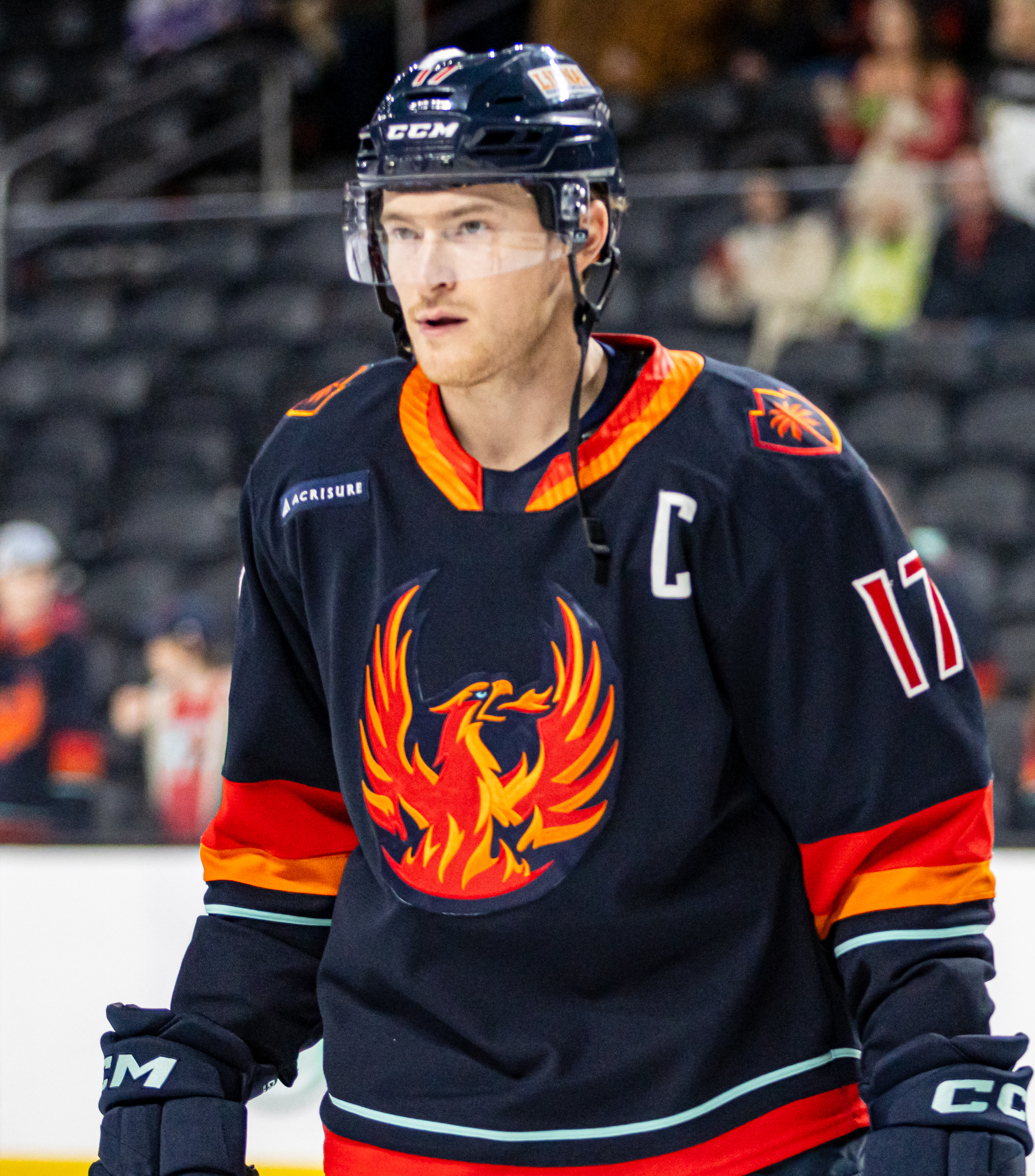
Max McCormick was the Firebirds' first and only captain from 2022 to 2026.

The Coachella Valley Firebirds are a professional ice hockey team based in Thousand Palms, California. They are members of the Pacific Division of the Western Conference of the American Hockey League (AHL). The team was founded as an expansion franchise for the 2022–23 season. They are affiliated with the National Hockey League (NHL)'s Seattle Kraken, meaning that the Kraken can send their prospects or other players to the team, as long as they are signed to an NHL contract with the team. Since their creation, 86 players have played for the Firebirds in at least one regular season or postseason game—12 goaltenders and 74 skaters (forwards and defenseman).

Each AHL team may select a captain, who is "the only team member with the ability to discuss questions relating to the interpretation of the rules during the game with the referee." Captains are required to wear the letter "C" on their uniform for identification. The Firebirds' current and only captain is Max McCormick, his captaincy starting in 2022 and ending with his retirement in 2026.

The Firebirds player with the most games played with the team is John Hayden, with 223. McCormick leads the Firebirds in goals scored, with 67, and Logan Morrison leads the Firebirds in assists, with 85, and points, with 144.

== Key ==
- * Appeared in a Firebirds game during the 2025–26 season
- † Calder Cup champion with the Firebirds
- ‡ Played part of the 2025–26 season with both the Firebirds and the Seattle Kraken

Abbreviations
| GP | Games played |
| Nat. | Nationality |

Nationality
| (Belarus) | Belarus |
| (Canada) | Canada |
| (Czech Republic) | Czech Republic |
| (Denmark) | Denmark |
| (Finland) | Finland |
| (Germany) | Germany |
| (Netherlands) | Netherlands |
| (Russia) | Russia |
| (Slovakia) | Slovakia |
| (Sweden) | Sweden |
| (United States) | United States |

Goaltenders
| W | Wins |
| L | Losses |
| OTL | Overtime losses |
| SO | Shutouts |
| GAA | Goals against average |
| SV% | Save percentage |

Skaters
| Pos. | Position | RW | Right wing | A | Assists |
| D | Defenseman | C | Center | P | Points |
| LW | Left wing | G | Goals | PIM | Penalty minutes |

Statistics reflect time with the Firebirds only. Statistics complete as of the 2026 Calder Cup playoffs.

== Goaltenders ==
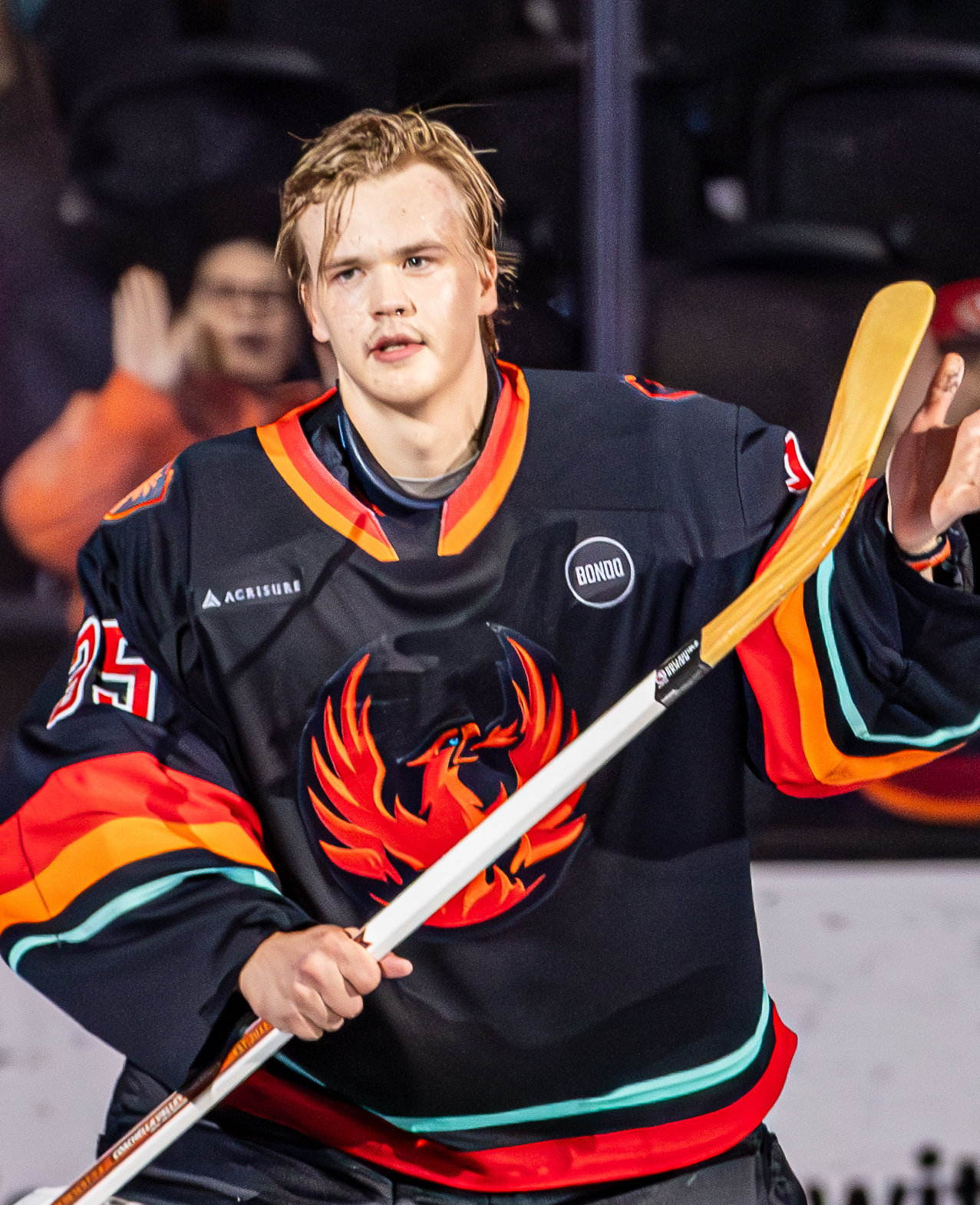
Nikke Kokko has played the most games out of any Firebirds goaltender, 68, and has the most wins, 39.

List of Coachella Valley Firebirds goaltenders
| Name | Nat. | Seasons^{[a]} | Regular season | | | | | | | Playoffs | | | | | |
| Name | Nat. | Seasons^{[a]} | GP | W | L | OTL | SO | GAA | SV% | GP | W | L | SO | GAA | SV% |
|---|---|---|---|---|---|---|---|---|---|---|---|---|---|---|---|
| Callum Booth | (Canada) | 2022–2023 | 2 | 2 | 0 | 0 | 0 | 1.84 | .950 | — | — | — | — | — | — |
| Joey Daccord | (United States) | 2022–2023 | 38 | 26 | 8 | 3 | 3 | 2.38 | .918 | 26 | 15 | 11 | 3 | 2.22 | .926 |
| Chris Driedger | (Canada) | 2022–2024 | 53 | 33 | 11 | 7 | 5 | 2.44 | .913 | 18 | 12 | 6 | 1 | 2.67 | .906 |
| Christopher Gibson | (Finland) | 2022–2023 | 20 | 10 | 5 | 4 | 2 | 2.98 | .894 | — | — | — | — | — | — |
| Philipp Grubauer | (Germany) | 2024–2025 | 7 | 5 | 2 | 0 | 0 | 2.87 | .893 | — | — | — | — | — | — |
| Nikke Kokko‡ | (Finland) | 2024–present | 68 | 39 | 20 | 4 | 2 | 2.69 | .906 | 18 | 9 | 9 | 3 | 2.37 | .911 |
| Jack LaFontaine* | (Canada) | 2023–present | 10 | 7 | 0 | 1 | 1 | 2.08 | .925 | — | — | — | — | — | — |
| Cale Morris | (United States) | 2023–2024 | 7 | 2 | 2 | 2 | 0 | 2.63 | .919 | — | — | — | — | — | — |
| Victor Östman‡ | (Sweden) | 2024–present | 41 | 19 | 16 | 5 | 3 | 2.76 | .907 | 1 | 0 | 0 | 0 | 0.00 | 1.000 |
| Shane Starrett | (United States) | 2022–2023 | 1 | 1 | 0 | 0 | 0 | 1.01 | .950 | — | — | — | — | — | — |
| Aleš Stezka | (Czech Republic) | 2023–2025 | 53 | 27 | 18 | 7 | 2 | 2.77 | .906 | — | — | — | — | — | — |
| Logan Terness* | (Canada) | 2025–present | 2 | 1 | 0 | 1 | 0 | 2.00 | .946 | — | — | — | — | — | — |

== Skaters ==
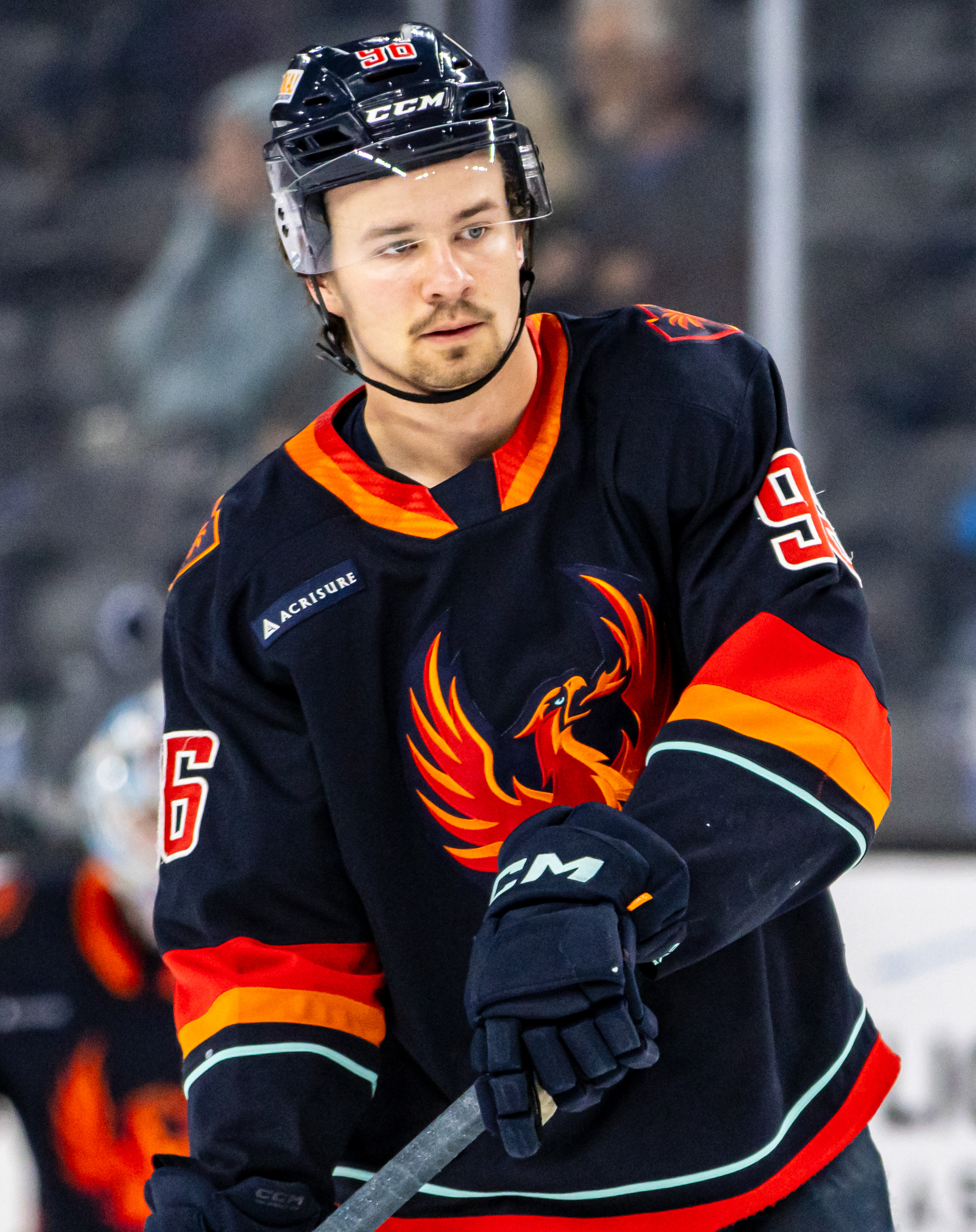
Logan Morrison has the most assists out of any Firebird, 85, as well as the most points out of any Firebird, 144.

List of Coachella Valley Firebirds skaters
| Name | Nat. | Pos. | Seasons^{[a]} | Regular season | | | | | Playoffs | | | | | Notes |
| Name | Nat. | Pos. | Seasons^{[a]} | GP | G | A | P | PIM | GP | G | A | P | PIM | Notes |
|---|---|---|---|---|---|---|---|---|---|---|---|---|---|---|
| Max Andreev | (Russia) | C | 2023–2024 | 5 | 0 | 0 | 0 | 4 | – | – | – | – | – | |
| Jon-Randall Avon* | (Canada) | C | 2025–present | 45 | 10 | 14 | 24 | 12 | 12 | 7 | 1 | 8 | 0 | |
| Jackson Berezowski* | (Canada) | RW | 2025–present | 9 | 0 | 1 | 1 | 2 | — | — | — | — | — | |
| Brandon Biro | (Canada) | LW | 2024–2025 | 56 | 6 | 28 | 34 | 19 | 5 | 1 | 1 | 2 | 2 | |
| Cade Borchardt | (United States) | C | 2024–2025 | 5 | 0 | 0 | 0 | 0 | — | — | — | — | — | |
| Nikolas Brouillard | (Canada) | D | 2024–2025 | 69 | 7 | 31 | 38 | 55 | 6 | 0 | 1 | 1 | 6 | |
| Drake Burgin* | (Canada) | D | 2025–present | 1 | 0 | 0 | 0 | 0 | — | — | — | — | — | |
| Connor Carrick | (United States) | D | 2023–2024 | 70 | 9 | 25 | 34 | 66 | 18 | 1 | 6 | 7 | 8 | |
| David Cotton | (United States) | C | 2022–2023 | 2 | 0 | 0 | 0 | 0 | – | – | – | – | – | |
| Lukas Dragicevic* | (Canada) | C | 2023–2024, 2025–present | 46 | 1 | 11 | 12 | 26 | 3 | 0 | 0 | 0 | 4 | |
| Ryker Evans | (Canada) | D | 2022–2024 | 96 | 8 | 51 | 59 | 102 | 44 | 9 | 27 | 36 | 56 | |
| Jakub Fibigr | (Czech Republic) | D | 2024–2025 | 1 | 0 | 0 | 0 | 0 | — | — | — | — | — | |
| Jagger Firkus* | (Canada) | RW | 2022–2023, 2024–present | 132 | 36 | 56 | 92 | 38 | 19 | 4 | 8 | 12 | 18 | |
| Cale Fleury | (Canada) | D | 2023–2025 | 104 | 14 | 48 | 62 | 31 | 21 | 5 | 9 | 14 | 10 | |
| Jesper Frödén | (Sweden) | RW | 2022–2023 | 44 | 25 | 22 | 47 | 24 | 15 | 5 | 5 | 10 | 8 | |
| David Goyette* | (Canada) | C | 2022–present | 108 | 9 | 19 | 28 | 95 | 4 | 0 | 1 | 1 | 0 | |
| Kaden Hammell* | (Canada) | C | 2025–present | 44 | 6 | 7 | 13 | 30 | 12 | 1 | 1 | 2 | 9 | |
| John Hayden‡ | (United States) | C | 2022–present | 223 | 56 | 54 | 110 | 292 | 46 | 12 | 10 | 22 | 50 | |
| Luke Henman | (Canada) | C | 2022–2025 | 171 | 20 | 25 | 45 | 85 | 33 | 3 | 7 | 10 | 10 | |
| Cameron Hughes | (Canada) | C | 2022–2024 | 130 | 44 | 69 | 113 | 113 | 44 | 4 | 35 | 39 | 15 | |
| Justin Janicke* | (United States) | LW | 2024–present | 12 | 0 | 3 | 3 | 4 | — | — | — | — | — | |
| Ryan Jones | (United States) | D | 2023–2025 | 46 | 0 | 7 | 7 | 24 | 3 | 0 | 1 | 1 | 0 | |
| Tyson Jugnauth* | (Canada) | D | 2025–present | 72 | 9 | 36 | 45 | 44 | 12 | 0 | 4 | 4 | 4 | |
| Tye Kartye | (Canada) | LW | 2022–2023 | 72 | 28 | 29 | 57 | 74 | 18 | 6 | 2 | 8 | 8 | Dudley "Red" Garrett Memorial Award 2023 |
| Michal Kempný | (Czech Republic) | D | 2022–2023 | 2 | 1 | 0 | 1 | 0 | – | – | – | – | – | |
| Maxime Lajoie | (Canada) | D | 2024–2025 | 70 | 4 | 34 | 38 | 32 | 6 | 1 | 0 | 1 | 0 | |
| Kole Lind | (Canada) | RW | 2022–2024 | 141 | 47 | 80 | 127 | 156 | 44 | 14 | 28 | 42 | 28 | |
| Andrei Loshko* | (Belarus) | C | 2024–present | 52 | 7 | 9 | 16 | 16 | 2 | 0 | 0 | 0 | 0 | |
| Cooper Marody* | (United States) | C | 2025–present | 15 | 5 | 6 | 11 | 10 | 4 | 0 | 0 | 0 | 6 | |
| Landon McCallum* | (Canada) | RW | 2025–present | 3 | 0 | 0 | 0 | 4 | – | – | – | – | – | |
| Max McCormick | (United States) | LW | 2022–2025 | 158 | 67 | 73 | 140 | 150 | 44 | 22 | 16 | 38 | 44 | Captain 2022–2026 |
| Jeremy McKenna | (Canada) | RW | 2022–2024 | 38 | 7 | 8 | 15 | 8 | 18 | 6 | 6 | 12 | 8 | |
| Ian McKinnon* | (Canada) | C | 2022–present | 163 | 12 | 13 | 25 | 526 | 7 | 0 | 0 | 0 | 7 | |
| Jake McLaughlin | (United States) | D | 2022–2023, 2024–2025 | 3 | 0 | 0 | 0 | 0 | – | – | – | – | – | |
| Jaycob Megna | (United States) | D | 2023–2024 | 2 | 1 | 0 | 1 | 0 | – | – | – | – | – | |
| Jacob Melanson‡ | (Canada) | RW | 2022–present | 132 | 23 | 27 | 50 | 163 | 36 | 4 | 10 | 14 | 44 | |
| Oscar Fisker Molgaard‡ | (Denmark) | C | 2024–present | 56 | 12 | 25 | 37 | 12 | 12 | 7 | 4 | 11 | 2 | |
| Ben Meyers‡ | (United States) | C | 2024–present | 68 | 32 | 32 | 64 | 28 | 6 | 1 | 2 | 3 | 2 | |
| Logan Morrison* | (Canada) | C | 2023–present | 204 | 59 | 85 | 144 | 62 | 36 | 2 | 17 | 19 | 4 | |
| Tristan Mullin | (Canada) | LW/C | 2022–2023 | 15 | 0 | 0 | 0 | 6 | – | – | – | – | – | |
| Ty Nelson* | (Canada) | D | 2024–present | 135 | 17 | 50 | 67 | 64 | 18 | 2 | 5 | 7 | 2 | |
| Jakov Novak* | (Canada) | LW/C/RW | 2025–present | 37 | 5 | 7 | 12 | 14 | 4 | 0 | 0 | 0 | 2 | |
| Jani Nyman‡ | (Finland) | RW | 2023–present | 102 | 51 | 28 | 79 | 66 | 27 | 4 | 7 | 11 | 26 | |
| Jake O'Brien* | (Canada) | C | 2025–present | — | — | — | — | — | 4 | 0 | 0 | 0 | 0 | |
| Gustav Olofsson* | (Sweden) | D | 2022–present | 170 | 9 | 58 | 67 | 78 | 62 | 4 | 12 | 16 | 28 | |
| Ville Ottavainen* | (Finland) | D | 2022–present | 193 | 14 | 52 | 66 | 142 | 36 | 1 | 8 | 9 | 38 | |
| Nick Pastujov | (United States) | LW | 2022–2023 | 6 | 0 | 0 | 0 | 0 | 6 | 0 | 0 | 0 | 2 | |
| Ville Petman | (Finland) | C | 2022–2024 | 127 | 14 | 26 | 40 | 41 | 26 | 5 | 6 | 11 | 8 | |
| Valtteri Piironen* | (Finland) | D | 2025–present | 1 | 0 | 0 | 0 | 0 | – | – | – | – | – | |
| Austin Poganski | (United States) | RW | 2022–2023 | 70 | 8 | 20 | 28 | 30 | 24 | 2 | 2 | 4 | 10 | |
| Andrew Poturalski | (United States) | C | 2022–2024 | 98 | 26 | 67 | 93 | 44 | 29 | 5 | 17 | 22 | 20 | |
| Caden Price* | (Canada) | D | 2025–present | 42 | 2 | 9 | 11 | 15 | – | – | – | – | – | |
| Brogan Rafferty | (United States) | D | 2022–2023 | 72 | 9 | 42 | 51 | 42 | 26 | 2 | 9 | 11 | 4 | |
| Carson Rehkopf* | (Canada) | LW | 2024–present | 71 | 13 | 6 | 19 | 24 | 13 | 0 | 1 | 1 | 2 | |
| Mitch Reinke | (United States) | D | 2023–2024 | 25 | 1 | 4 | 5 | 12 | – | – | – | – | – | |
| Tucker Robertson | (Canada) | C | 2023–2025 | 77 | 10 | 9 | 19 | 19 | 4 | 0 | 0 | 0 | 0 | |
| Lleyton Roed* | (Canada) | LW | 2023–present | 126 | 25 | 41 | 66 | 37 | 17 | 4 | 4 | 8 | 6 | |
| Eduard Šalé* | (Czech Republic) | RW | 2023–present | 109 | 19 | 29 | 48 | 28 | 15 | 2 | 2 | 4 | 4 | |
| Jimmy Schuldt | (United States) | D | 2022–2024 | 139 | 13 | 43 | 56 | 73 | 44 | 8 | 7 | 15 | 10 | |
| Peetro Seppälä | (Finland) | D | 2022–2024 | 119 | 2 | 21 | 23 | 65 | – | – | – | – | – | |
| Devin Shore | (Canada) | C | 2023–2024 | 39 | 7 | 18 | 25 | 4 | 18 | 5 | 8 | 13 | 4 | |
| Daniel Sprong | (Netherlands) | RW | 2024–2025 | 19 | 11 | 14 | 25 | 6 | – | – | – | – | – | |
| Mitchell Stephens* | (Canada) | C | 2024–present | 104 | 18 | 22 | 40 | 45 | 14 | 5 | 2 | 7 | 6 | |
| Luke Stevens | (United States) | LW | 2022–2023 | 6 | 0 | 0 | 0 | 2 | – | – | – | – | – | |
| Marián Studenič | (Slovakia) | RW | 2023–2024 | 64 | 15 | 29 | 44 | 14 | 18 | 4 | 7 | 11 | 8 | |
| Matt Tennyson | (United States) | D | 2022–2023 | 71 | 0 | 18 | 18 | 66 | 26 | 0 | 3 | 3 | 28 | |
| Alexander True | (Denmark) | C | 2022–2023 | 72 | 11 | 21 | 32 | 48 | – | – | – | – | – | |
| Carsen Twarynski | (Canada) | LW | 2022–2023 | 71 | 17 | 9 | 26 | 69 | 26 | 5 | 3 | 8 | 14 | |
| Zachary Uens* | (Canada) | D | 2025–present | 21 | 1 | 4 | 5 | 15 | – | – | – | – | – | |
| Nathan Villeneuve | (Canada) | C | 2024–2025 | 5 | 0 | 1 | 1 | 9 | 3 | 0 | 1 | 1 | 2 | |
| Ryan Winterton | (Canada) | C | 2023–2025 | 114 | 40 | 32 | 72 | 49 | 22 | 9 | 5 | 14 | 12 | |
| Eddie Wittchow | (United States) | D | 2022–2023 | 56 | 4 | 5 | 9 | 93 | 26 | 3 | 0 | 3 | 14 | |
| Charlie Wright* | (Canada) | D | 2024–present | 67 | 1 | 5 | 6 | 6 | 9 | 0 | 0 | 0 | 0 | |
| Shane Wright | (Canada) | C | 2022–2024 | 67 | 26 | 27 | 53 | 20 | 36 | 6 | 16 | 22 | 6 | |

== Notes ==
- ^{a} The "Seasons" column lists the first year of the season of the player's first game and the last year of the season of the player's last game. For example, a player who played one game in the 2022–23 season would be listed as playing with the team from 2022 to 2023, regardless of what calendar year the game occurred within.
