= 2024–25 Coachella Valley Firebirds season =

Hockey team season

2024–25 Coachella Valley Firebirds
- Division: Pacific
- Conference: Western
- 2024–25 record: 4–5–0–0 (8 pts)
- Home record: 1–2–0–0
- Road record: 3–3–0–0
- Goals for: 25
- Goals against: 31

Team information
- General manager: Troy Bodie (de facto—VP of Hockey Operations)
- Coach: Derek Laxdal
- Captain: Max McCormick
- Alternate captains: Gustav Olofsson
- Arena: Acrisure Arena

Team leaders
- Goals: Cale Fleury; Jacob Melanson; Ryan Winterton (3)
- Assists: Brandon Biro (5)
- Points: Ben Meyers (6)
- Penalty minutes: Ian McKinnon (24)
- Wins: Nikke Kokko (3)
- Goals against average: Nikke Kokko (3.00)

The 2024–25 Coachella Valley Firebirds season is the franchise's third season in the American Hockey League (AHL), starting on October 11, 2024. They play their home games at Acrisure Arena.

This is the first season of Derek Laxdal being the Firebirds' head coach, as he replaced Dan Bylsma at the position on July 5, 2024. This is because Bylsma was heading to the National Hockey League (NHL)'s Seattle Kraken to replace Dave Hakstol as their head coach.

== Background ==
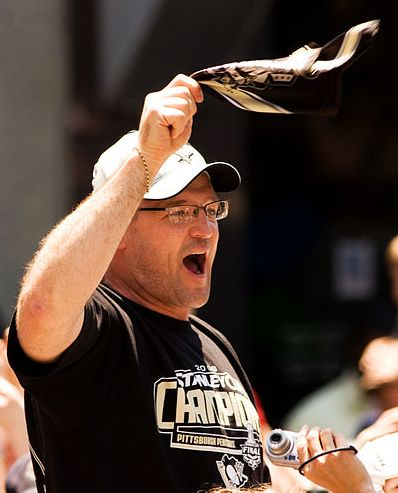
Dan Bylsma left the Firebirds in order to become the Seattle Kraken's head coach on May 28, 2024.

The Firebirds were founded as an expansion team in the Coachella Valley as the AHL affiliate of the NHL's Seattle Kraken, and started play during the AHL's 2022–23 season. During that season, the Firebirds achieved 103 points during the regular season, and eventually climbed to the Calder Cup Finals, only to lose to the Hershey Bears. During the Firebirds' 2023–24 season, they also achieved 103 points during the regular season, climbed to the Calder Cup Finals, and lost to the Hershey Bears.

On April 29, 2024, following the end of the Seattle Kraken's 2023–24 season, their head coach, Dave Hakstol, was fired. The Kraken organization made the decision to replace him with Coachella Valley Firebirds head coach Dan Bylsma on May 28. This was important for the Firebirds because, as previously mentioned, Bylsma had coached them all the way to the Calder Cup Finals in both of their seasons. On July 5, it was announced that Derek Laxdal was going to replace Bylsma.

On June 30, the Kraken prepared for the upcoming free agency by re-signing four players, all of whom had contributed to the Firebirds strong efforts the previous season—John Hayden, Luke Henman, Ales Stezka, and Firebirds captain Max McCormick.

== Off-season ==
On July 1, the first day of free agency, the Kraken lost six players, who had spent much of their time during the 2023–24 season with the Firebirds—Devin Shore, Connor Carrick, Kole Lind, Cameron Hughes, Jimmy Schuldt, and Chris Driedger. Lind had been one of the driving forces in Coachella Valley—over their two seasons, he had the most games played (141), the most assists (80), and was tied with Max McCormick for the most points (127). Driedger was yet another factor in the Firebirds' success, as he led the Firebirds in both games played (53) and wins (33) by a goaltender. The trend of players who had spent time with the Firebirds leaving continued on July 2, when and Peetro Seppala left the Kraken. The Kraken made history on July 3, by hiring Jessica Campbell as an assistant coach, as she became the first woman to be in a coaching position in the NHL. She had spent the previous two seasons with the Firebirds, helping them reach the Calder Cup Finals during both of them. Also that day, Firebirds alternate captain Andrew Poturalski left the Kraken. To replace Campbell, the Firebirds hired Brennan Sonne to be an assistant coach for the team on July 15. The previous season, Sonne had served as the head coach of the Western Hockey League (WHL)'s Saskatoon Blades, leading them to achieve the best regular season record in the WHL with 105 points. On July 16, the Kraken saw the departure of another player who had spent time with the Firebirds, Mitch Reinke. On July 18, the first player who was directly under contract to the Firebirds left the team—Justin Nachbaur.

On August 1, the Firebirds re-signed player Ian McKinnon for one year. On August 8, the Firebirds signed their first player of free agency, Cam Morrison. The Firebirds re-signed goaltender Jack LaFontaine, on August 15. On August 20, the Firebirds signed Damien Giroux. Two days later, the Firebirds re-signed Max Andreev. During the previous season, Andreev was named to the ECHL's 2023–24 All-Rookie Team after achieving 72 points in 61 games. On August 27, the Firebirds signed a former captain of the Western Hockey League's Everett Silvertips, Jackson Berezowski. On August 29, the Firebirds signed another ECHL All-Rookie Team member, Cade Borchardt. On September 3, the Firebirds signed Turner Ottenbreit, and two days later, they re-signed Jake McLaughlin.
