= List of current AHL captains and alternate captains =

The American Hockey League (AHL) is a professional ice hockey league composed of 32 teams, founded in 1936. Each team may select a captain, who has the "privilege of discussing with the referee any questions relating to interpretation of rules which may arise during the progress of a game." Each team is also permitted to select alternate captains, who serve when the captain is not on the ice. Captains are required to wear the letter "C" on their uniform for identification while alternate captains wear the letter "A"; both letters are 3 inches (7.6 cm) in height.

Rule 6.2 of the 2024–25 Official AHL Rulebook indicates that "[only] when the captain is not in uniform, the coach shall have the right to designate three alternate captains. This must be done prior to the start of the game." Many AHL teams with a named captain select more than two alternate captains and rotate the "A"s among these players throughout the season.

Goaltenders are not permitted to serve as captains during games. This rule follows that which was instituted in the National Hockey League (NHL) in 1948 after teams complained that it took Montreal Canadiens goaltender Bill Durnan too long to skate to talk with the officials and back to his crease. As a result, no goalie has ever served as captain of an AHL team.

== Key ==
† Spent entire AHL career with team

Position abbreviations
Abbreviation	Definition
C	Centre
LW	Left wing
RW	Right wing
D	Defenceman

== Captains ==
Thirty of the thirty-two AHL teams currently have a captain, with theCharlotte Checkers and the Manitoba Moose being the two exceptions. Of the thirty captains, six of them have been with their team for their entire career. The longest-tenured captain in the league is Curtis McKenzie of the Texas Stars, who has served in that role since October 15, 2021.

Team	Captain	Since	Pos
Abbotsford Canucks	Chase Wouters†	2022–23	C/LW
Bakersfield Condors	Seth Griffith	2024–25	C
Belleville Senators	Scott Harrington	2026–27	D
Calgary Wranglers	Rory Kerins†	2026–27	C
Charlotte Checkers	Vacant	2026–27 (Note: Most recent captain, Trevor Carrick, left as a free agent following the 2025–26 season and signed with EHC München of the DEL.)	—
Chicago Wolves	Josiah Slavin	2024–25	LW
Cleveland Monsters	Owen Sillinger†	2026–27	C/LW
Coachella Valley Firebirds	John Hayden	2026–27	C
Colorado Eagles	Jayson Megna	2024–25	C
Grand Rapids Griffins	Dominik Shine†	2025–26	RW
Hamilton Hammers	Matthew Highmore	2026–27	C
Hartford Wolf Pack	Marc Del Gaizo	2026–27	D
Henderson Silver Knights	Jaycob Megna	2025–26	D
Hershey Bears	Louie Belpedio	2026–27	D
Iowa Wild	Mason Shaw	2026–27	C
Laval Rocket	Lucas Condotta†	2024–25	LW
Lehigh Valley Phantoms	Garrett Wilson	2023–24	LW
Manitoba Moose	Vacant	2026–27 (Note: Most recent captain, Mason Shaw, left as a free agent following the 2025–26 season and re-signed with the Minnesota Wild of the NHL.)	—
Milwaukee Admirals	Kevin Gravel	2023–24	D
Ontario Reign	Joe Hicketts	2024–25	D
Providence Bruins	Billy Sweezey	2026–27	D
Rochester Americans	Matthew Peca	2026–27	C
Rockford IceHogs	Brett Seney	2024–25	C
San Diego Gulls	Ryan Carpenter	2024–25	C
San Jose Barracuda	Jimmy Huntington	2026–27	C/LW
Springfield Thunderbirds	Chris Wagner	2026–27	C
Syracuse Crunch	Steven Santini	2025–26	D
Texas Stars	Curtis McKenzie	2021–22	LW
Toronto Marlies	Logan Shaw	2022–23	RW
Tucson Roadrunners	Austin Poganski	2024–25	RW
Utica Comets	Ryan Schmelzer†	2021–22	C
Wilkes-Barre/Scranton Penguins	Phil Kemp	2025–26	D

== Alternate captains ==
Thirty-one of the thirty-two AHL teams have named at least the regulation two alternate captains, with the Hamilton Hammers being the sole exception. Of the eighty-five alternate captains, twenty-six of them have been with their team for their entire career. Teams that have named more than the regulation two alternate captains (or three in the case of teams without a captain) are required to rotate the two (or three) "A"s between those players by methods of their choosing. The current longest-tenured alternate captains in the league is Keaton Middleton of the Colorado Eagles, who has served in that role since the 2022–2023 season.

Team	Alternate Captain(s)	Since	Pos
Abbotsford Canucks	Trey Fix-Wolansky	2026–27	RW
Abbotsford Canucks	Ty Mueller†	2025–26	C
Abbotsford Canucks	Jimmy Schuldt	2025–26	D
Bakersfield Condors	Josh Brown	2026–27	D
Bakersfield Condors	Riley Stillman	2026–27	D
Belleville Senators	Philippe Daoust†	2026–27	LW
Belleville Senators	Philip Tomasino	2026–27	RW
Calgary Wranglers	Alex Gallant	2026–27	LW
Calgary Wranglers	Dryden Hunt	2024–25	LW
Calgary Wranglers	Sam Morton†	2026–27	LW
Calgary Wranglers	Ben Jones	2026–27	C
Charlotte Checkers	Tobias Björnfot	2026–27	D
Charlotte Checkers	MacKenzie Entwistle	2025–26	RW
Charlotte Checkers	Casey Fitzgerald	2026–27	D
Charlotte Checkers	Riese Gaber†	2026–27	RW
Chicago Wolves	Juha Jaaska†	2024–25	LW
Chicago Wolves	Ronan Seeley†	2024–25	D
Cleveland Monsters	Jack Williams†	2026–27	C
Cleveland Monsters	Colton White	2026–27	D
Coachella Valley Firebirds	Logan Morrison†	2026–27	C
Coachella Valley Firebirds	Ty Nelson†	2026–27	D
Coachella Valley Firebirds	Gustav Olofsson	2025–26	D
Coachella Valley Firebirds	Mitchell Stephens	2026–27	C
Colorado Eagles	Wyatt Aamodt†	2026–27	D
Colorado Eagles	Keaton Middleton	2022–23	D
Colorado Eagles	Vinnie Hinostroza	2026–27	RW
Grand Rapids Griffins	Sheldon Dries	2024–25	C
Grand Rapids Griffins	William Lagesson	2025–26	D
Hamilton Hammers	Daylan Kuefler†	2026–27	C
Hamilton Hammers	Rotating	2026–27	—N/a
Hartford Wolf Pack	Anton Blidh	2024–25	LW
Hartford Wolf Pack	Justin Dowling	2025–26	C
Hartford Wolf Pack	Glenn Gawdin	2026–27	C
Henderson Silver Knights	Mitch McLain	2025–26	C
Henderson Silver Knights	Jonas Røndbjerg	2024–25	RW
Henderson Silver Knights	Kai Uchacz†	2025–26	C/RW
Hershey Bears	Jonny Brodzinski	2026–27	C/RW
Hershey Bears	Josh Dunne	2026–27	C/LW
Hershey Bears	Jacob MacDonald	2026–27	D
Hershey Bears	Spencer Smallman	2025–26	RW
Iowa Wild	Dylan Gambrell	2026–27	C
Iowa Wild	Matt Kiersted	2025–26	C
Iowa Wild	Gerry Mayhew	2026–27	C
Iowa Wild	Tyler Pitlick	2025–26	C
Laval Rocket	Alex Belzile	2025–26	RW
Laval Rocket	Laurent Dauphin	2026–27	C
Lehigh Valley Phantoms	Jacob Gaucher†	2025–26	C
Lehigh Valley Phantoms	Zayde Wisdom†	2025–26	C
Manitoba Moose	Tyson Empey	2026–27	C/LW
Manitoba Moose	Parker Ford†	2026–27	C
Manitoba Moose	Noah Gregor	2026–27	C
Manitoba Moose	Isaak Phillips	2026–27	D
Manitoba Moose	Ashton Sautner	2023–24	D
Milwaukee Admirals	Jake Lucchini	2025–26	C
Milwaukee Admirals	Kyle Marino	2025–26	C
Ontario Reign	Cole Guttman	2026–27	C
Ontario Reign	Lane Pederson	2026–27	C
Providence Bruins	Brendan Gaunce	2026–27	C
Providence Bruins	Tobie Paquette-Bisson	2026–27	D
Rochester Americans	Riley Fiddler-Schultz†	2026–27	C
Rochester Americans	Dennis Gilbert	2026–27	D
Rockford IceHogs	Cavan Fitzgerald†	2024–25	D
Rockford IceHogs	Connor Mackey	2026–27	D
Rockford IceHogs	Landon Slaggert†	2026–27	LW
San Diego Gulls	James Hamblin	2026–27	C
San Diego Gulls	Matthew Phillips	2025–26	RW
San Jose Barracuda	Patrick Giles	2025–26	C
San Jose Barracuda	Roland McKeown	2026–27	D
Springfield Thunderbirds	Quinton Burns†	2026–27	D
Springfield Thunderbirds	Aleksanteri Kaskimäki†	2026–27	C
Springfield Thunderbirds	Dylan Peterson†	2026–27	C/RW
Syracuse Crunch	Clark Bishop	2026–27	LW
Syracuse Crunch	Dylan Duke†	2026–27	C
Syracuse Crunch	Jakob Pelletier	2025–26	LW
Syracuse Crunch	Jarred Tinordi	2026–27	D
Texas Stars	Kyle Burroughs	2026–27	D
Texas Stars	Cameron Hughes	2024–25	C
Texas Stars	Mike Sgarbossa	2026–27	C
Toronto Marlies	Dakota Mermis	2025–26	D
Toronto Marlies	Reese Johnson	2025–26	C
Toronto Marlies	Marshall Rifai†	2026–27	D
Tucson Roadrunners	Ben McCartney†	2023–24	LW
Tucson Roadrunners	Robbie Russo	2026–27	D
Utica Comets	Marc McLaughlin	2026–27	C
Utica Comets	Riley Tufte	2026–27	LW
Wilkes-Barre/Scranton Penguins	Avery Hayes†	2025–26	RW
Wilkes-Barre/Scranton Penguins	Atley Calvert†	2026–27	C
