= List of Coachella Valley Firebirds seasons =

List of seasons played by the Coachella Valley Firebirds ice hockey team

The Coachella Valley Firebirds are a professional ice hockey team based in Thousand Palms, California. They are members of the Pacific Division of the Western Conference of the American Hockey League (AHL). The Firebirds began play in the 2022–23 AHL season. The team is an owned-and-operated affiliate of the National Hockey League (NHL)'s Seattle Kraken. As of the end of the 2023–24 season, the Firebirds have won 92 regular season games, made two playoff appearances, and have two conference championships.

The Firebirds' inaugural season was very successful. They placed second in their division, as well as second in the league, behind only the Calgary Wranglers with 103 points. During that season's Calder Cup playoffs, the Firebirds reached the Finals, before losing in overtime of game seven to the Hershey Bears. They pulled a similar feat in their second season, achieving 103 points in the regular season and reaching the Finals before losing to the Bears again, this time in overtime of game six.

== Table keys ==
Key of colors and symbols
Color/symbol	Explanation
†	Calder Cup champions
‡	Conference champions
↑	Division champions
#	Led league in points

Key of terms and abbreviations
Term or abbreviation	Definition
Finish	Final position in division standings
GP	Number of games played
W	Number of wins
L	Number of losses
OT	Number of losses in overtime
S/O	Number of losses in a shootout
Pts	Number of points
GF	Goals for (goals scored by the Firebirds)
GA	Goals against (goals scored by the Firebirds' opponents)
—	Does not apply

== Year by year ==
List of Coachella Valley Firebirds seasons
AHL season	Conference	Division	Regular season									Postseason			
AHL season	Conference	Division	Finish	GP	W	L	OT	S/O	Pts	GF	GA	GP	W	L	Result
2022–23	Western‡	Pacific	2nd	72	48	17	5	2	103	257	194	26	15	11	Won first round to Tucson Roadrunners, 2–1; Won division semifinals to Colorado Eagles, 3–2; Won division finals to Calgary Wranglers, 3–2; Won conference finals to Milwaukee Admirals, 4–2; Lost Calder Cup finals to Hershey Bears, 3–4
2023–24	Western‡	Pacific ↑	1st	72	46	15	6	5	103	252	182	18	12	6	Won division semifinals to Calgary Wranglers, 3–1; Won division finals to Ontario Reign, 3–0; Won conference finals to Milwaukee Admirals, 4–1; Lost Calder Cup finals to Hershey Bears, 2–4
2024–25	Western	Pacific	4th	72	37	25	5	5	84	225	205	6	3	3	Won first round to Calgary Wranglers, 2–0; Lost division semifinals to Abbotsford Canucks, 3–1
2025–26	Western	Pacific	4th	72	41	25	6	0	88	235	218	12	6	6	Won first round to Bakersfield Condors, 2–1; Won division semifinals to Ontario Reign, 3–2; Lost division finals to Colorado Eagles, 3–1
Totals				288	172	82	22	12	378	969	799	62	36	26	4 playoff appearances
