= Eddie Wittchow =

American ice hockey player

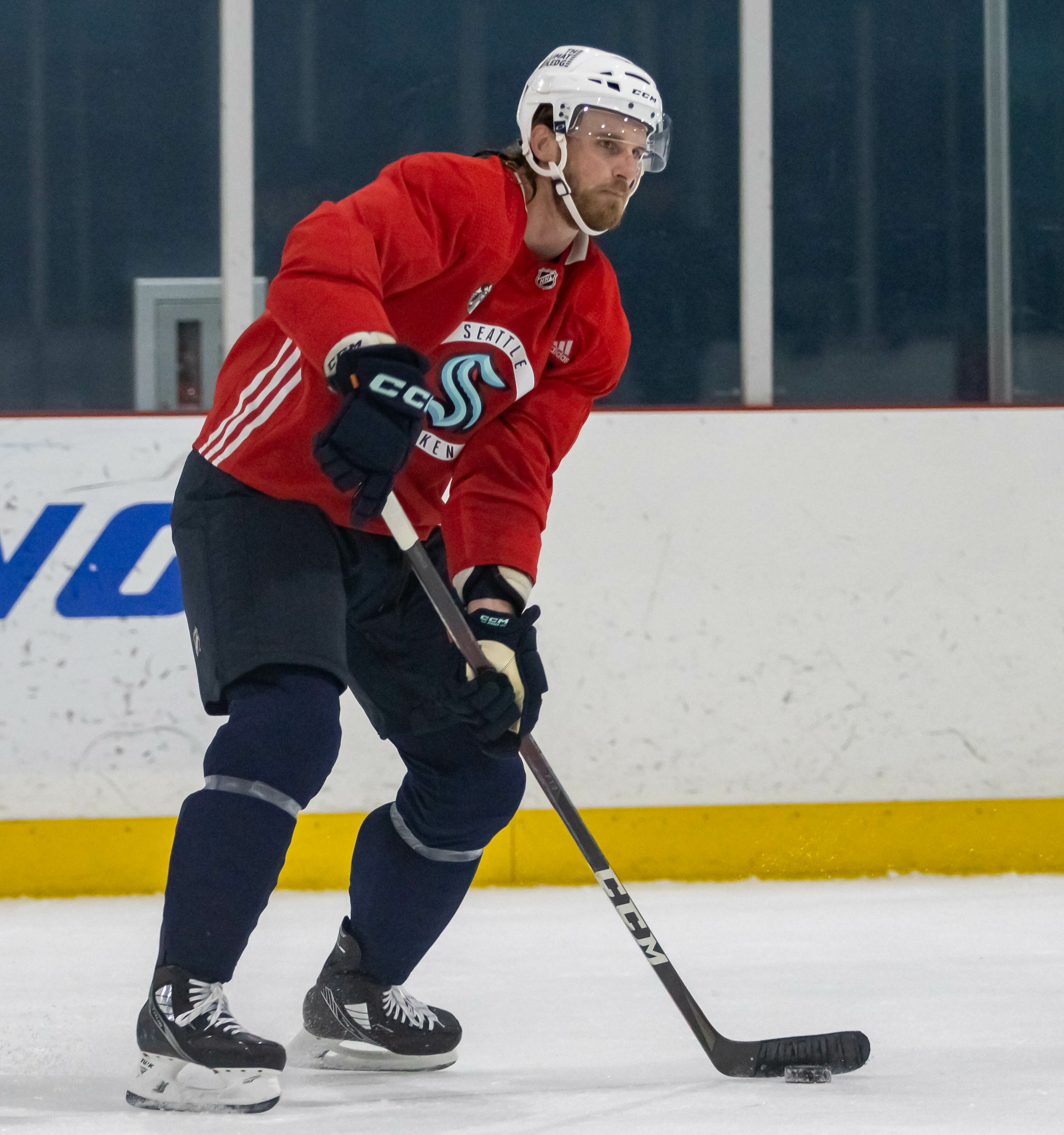
- Wittchow during Seattle Kraken practice in 2022
- Born: October 31, 1992 (age 33) Burnsville, Minnesota, U.S.
- Height: 6 ft 5 in (196 cm)
- Weight: 225 lb (102 kg; 16 st 1 lb)
- Position: Defense
- Shoots: Left
- AHL team Former teams: Free agent Springfield Thunderbirds; KooKoo; Hershey Bears; Coachella Valley Firebirds
- NHL draft: 154th overall, 2011; Florida Panthers
- Playing career: 2017–present

Edward Wittchow (born October 31, 1992) is an American professional ice hockey defenseman who is currently an unrestricted free agent. He most recently played under contract with the Coachella Valley Firebirds in the American Hockey League (AHL).

== Early life ==
Wittchow was born on October 31, 1992, in Burnsville, Minnesota to parents Steve and Tina. His sister Emma also played ice hockey in college and is married to Winnipeg Jets defenseman Brenden Dillon. Wittchow grew up a Wisconsin Badgers fan through family ties.

== Playing career ==
=== Junior ===
As a teenager in Minnesota, Wittchow attended Burnsville High School where he competed on their hockey team in the Lake Conference. As a junior in 2009–10, he scored two goals and six assists as his team was eliminated in the semifinals of the Section 2AA tournament. Following that season, Wittchow entered his first year of National Hockey League (NHL) draft eligibility but was not chosen by any team. He returned to Burnsville High School for his senior year where he broke out offensively, recording 11 goals and 15 assists in 28 games. Wittchow credited his improvement to his growth spurt and off-season training at FHIT. As a result of his improved play, Wittchow was named to Team Minnesota for the six-team Minnesota NIT tournament and was drafted 4th overall by the Waterloo Black Hawks of the United States Hockey League (USHL). Wittchow was also extended a scholarship to play for the Wisconsin Badgers of the Following his freshman season, the Badgers moved from the National Collegiate Athletic Association (NCAA)'s Western Collegiate Hockey Association (WCHA) following high school but he declined to continue his development.

Leading up to the 2011 NHL entry draft, Wittchow was ranked 111th overall for North American skaters by the NHL Central Scouting Bureau. In June, Wittchow was selected in the sixth round of the draft by the Florida Panthers. Following the draft, Wittchow joined the Black Hawks and finished the season with five goals with 13 assists. He finished his only USHL season with a selection for their All-Rookie team. While playing with the Black Hawks, Wittchow reconsidered Wisconsin's offer and committed to play for the team during the next season.

=== Collegiate ===
Wittchow joined the Badgers for the 2012–13 season and in a defense pairing with Joe Faust. Over 29 games, he recorded three assists and 28 penalty minutes as the team won the WCHA's playoff championship to reach the NCAA tournament. Following his freshman season, the Badgers moved from the WCHA to the Big Ten Conference.

During a game against the University of Minnesota in January 2016, Wittchow was issued a disqualification penalty for his hit on Tommy Novak and suspended for three games. Wittchow graduated from Wisconsin at the end of the season with a degree in economics.

=== Professional ===
Wittchow concluded his collegiate career by signing a professional tryout agreement with the Panthers for their 2016–17 season. After attending their 2016 training camp, the Panthers re-assigned him to the Springfield Thunderbirds of the American Hockey League (AHL) for the remainder of the season. Wittchow split the season playing in the AHL and with the Manchester Monarchs of the ECHL. He played 38 games with the Thunderbirds, recording four points, and 14 games with the Monarchs. Following the season, the Panthers signed Wittchow to a one-year two-way contract. He was named the Thunderbirds' IOA/American Specialty AHL Man of the Year for his "outstanding contributions to the Springfield community during the 2017–18 season."

On July 2, 2018, Wittchow signed a one-year contract to play with the KooKoo in the Finnish league Liiga. He played one season with the team, recording nine goals and nine points in 47 points before leaving to sign an AHL contract with the Hershey Bears for the 2019–20 season. Upon joining the team, he split the season between the Bears and their ECHL affiliate, the South Carolina Stingrays. Wittchow scored in his AHL debut on November 31 and finished the season with five goals. When playing with the Stingrays, Wittchow was appointed an assistant captain. As a result of his play, the Bears re-signed Wittchow to a one-year contract extension on August 19, 2020.

Having left the Bears organization after three seasons, Wittchow attended the Seattle Kraken's training camp before signing a one-year contract with their AHL affiliate, the Coachella Valley Firebirds, for their inaugural 2022–23 season, on September 22, 2022.

== Career statistics ==
			Regular season					Playoffs
Season	Team	League	GP	G	A	Pts	PIM	GP	G	A	Pts	PIM
2009–10	Burnsville High	USHS	25	2	5	7	20	2	0	1	1	0
2010–11	Burnsville High	USHS	25	9	14	23	28	3	2	1	3	2
2011–12	Waterloo Black Hawks	USHL	60	5	13	18	74	12	0	4	4	6
2012–13	University of Wisconsin	WCHA	29	0	3	3	28	—	—	—	—	—
2013–14	University of Wisconsin	B1G	37	1	6	7	26	—	—	—	—	—
2014–15	University of Wisconsin	B1G	25	0	0	0	43	—	—	—	—	—
2015–16	University of Wisconsin	B1G	32	0	7	7	53	—	—	—	—	—
2016–17	Manchester Monarchs	ECHL	14	1	8	9	17	—	—	—	—	—
2016–17	Springfield Thunderbirds	AHL	38	2	2	4	58	—	—	—	—	—
2017–18	Springfield Thunderbirds	AHL	59	5	10	15	80	—	—	—	—	—
2018–19	KooKoo	Liiga	47	9	9	18	65	—	—	—	—	—
2019–10	South Carolina Stingrays	ECHL	19	5	7	12	13	—	—	—	—	—
2019–20	Hershey Bears	AHL	22	5	4	9	29	—	—	—	—	—
2020–21	Hershey Bears	AHL	19	1	3	4	62	—	—	—	—	—
2021–22	Hershey Bears	AHL	48	1	4	5	61	3	0	0	0	2
2022–23	Coachella Valley Firebirds	AHL	56	4	5	9	93	26	3	0	3	14
AHL totals			242	18	28	46	383	29	3	0	3	16
Liiga totals			47	9	9	18	65	—	—	—	—	—
