= Ville Ottavainen =

Finnish ice hockey player (born 2002)

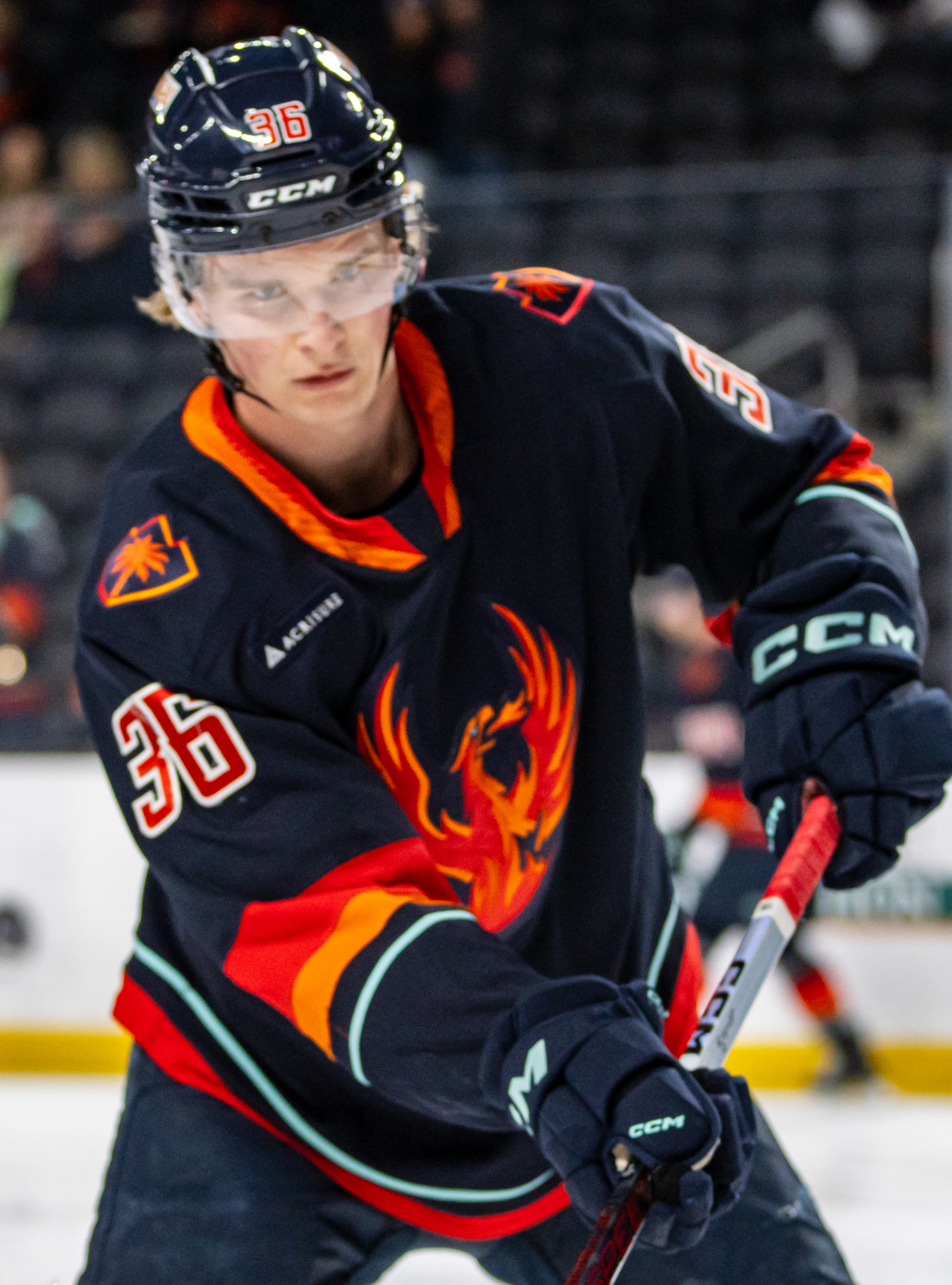
- Ottavainen with the Coachella Valley Firebirds in 2024.
- Born: August 12, 2002 (age 24) Oulu, Finland
- Height: 6 ft 5 in (196 cm)
- Weight: 210 lb (95 kg; 15 st 0 lb)
- Position: Defense
- Shoots: Right
- NHL team Former teams: Seattle Kraken; JYP Jyväskylä
- NHL draft: 99th overall, 2021; Seattle Kraken
- Playing career: 2020–present

Ville Ottavainen (born 12 August 2002) is a Finnish professional ice hockey player who is currently playing with the Seattle Kraken of the National Hockey League (NHL). He was selected 99th overall in the 2021 NHL entry draft by the Kraken.

== Playing career ==
Ottavainen originally played as a junior hockey with Oulun Kärpät through to the under-18 level before moving to North America to play major junior hockey with the Kitchener Rangers of the Ontario Hockey League (OHL) for the 2019–20 season.

With the following 2020–21 season postponed and later cancelled, Ottavainen remained in Finland and played on loan from the Rangers with JYP Jyväskylä of the Liiga. He played 22 games and put up 3 points. He was moved to play for KeuPa HT in Mestis for 2 games, posting 2 points. He secured a three-year contract extension on 23 March 2021.

Concluding his North American junior career, and following his selection in the fourth-round 99th overall by the Seattle Kraken in the 2021 NHL entry draft, Ottavainen continued his tenure with JYP in the 2021–22 season.

Following completion of the 2022–23 season, having set career bests of 11 assist and 16 points through 54 regular season games, Ottavainen activated his NHL out-clause in signing a three-year, entry-level contract with his draft club, the Seattle Kraken, on 20 March 2023.

== International play ==
Ottavainen originally made his full junior debut for Team Finland at the 2022 World Junior Championships, appearing in 1 game, before the tournament was cancelled due to the COVID-19 pandemic. He did not feature for Finland in the replay of the tournament, expunging his statistics.

== Personal life ==
Ottavainen's father Risto Ottavainen is a retired hockey player who last played for Kiekko-Oulu in 2003.

== Career statistics ==
			Regular season					Playoffs
Season	Team	League	GP	G	A	Pts	PIM	GP	G	A	Pts	PIM
2019–20	Kitchener Rangers	OHL	53	4	11	15	20	—	—	—	—	—
2020–21	JYP	U20 SM	15	7	8	15	16	—	—	—	—	—
2020–21	JYP	Liiga	22	1	2	3	10	—	—	—	—	—
2020–21	KeuPa HT	Mestis	2	1	1	2	0	—	—	—	—	—
2021–22	JYP	Liiga	44	6	8	14	59	—	—	—	—	—
2022–23	JYP	Liiga	54	5	11	16	30	—	—	—	—	—
2022–23	Coachella Valley Firebirds	AHL	2	0	0	0	0	—	—	—	—	—
2023–24	Coachella Valley Firebirds	AHL	70	8	26	34	30	18	0	3	3	24
2024–25	Coachella Valley Firebirds	AHL	68	3	12	15	41	6	0	2	2	4
2024–25	Seattle Kraken	NHL	1	0	1	1	0	—	—	—	—	—
2025–26	Coachella Valley Firebirds	AHL	53	3	14	17	71	12	1	3	4	10
Liiga totals			120	12	21	33	99	—	—	—	—	—
NHL totals			1	0	1	1	0	—	—	—	—	—
