= Max McCormick =

American ice hockey player (born 1992)

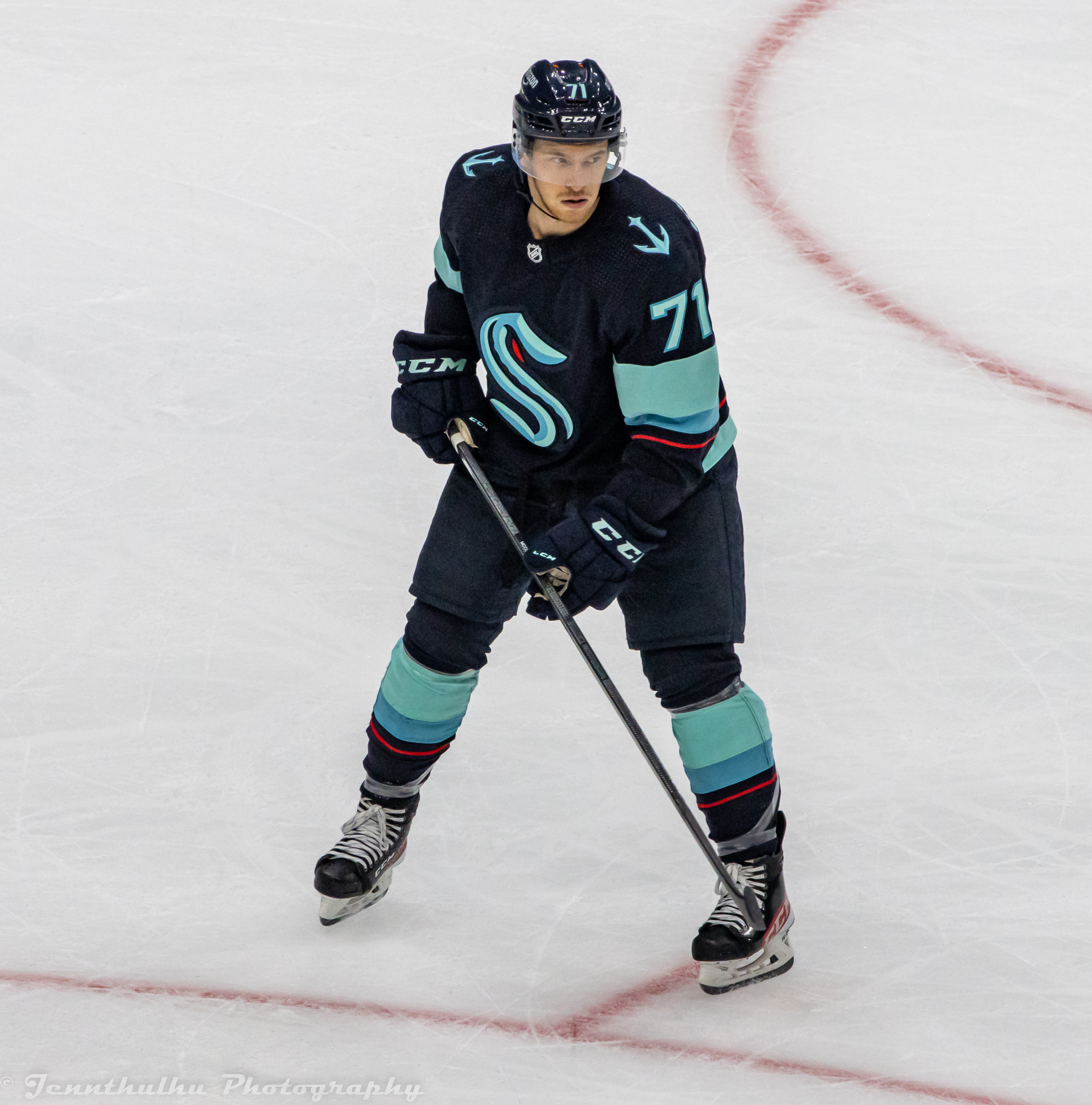
- McCormick with the Seattle Kraken in 2022
- Born: May 1, 1992 (age 34) De Pere, Wisconsin, U.S.
- Height: 5 ft 11 in (180 cm)
- Weight: 188 lb (85 kg; 13 st 6 lb)
- Position: Winger
- Shot: Left
- Played for: Ottawa Senators; Carolina Hurricanes; Seattle Kraken
- NHL draft: 171st overall, 2011; Ottawa Senators
- Playing career: 2014–2026

Maxwell McCormick (born May 1, 1992) is an American former professional ice hockey player who played in the National Hockey League (NHL) with the Ottawa Senators, Carolina Hurricanes and Seattle Kraken. McCormick was selected in the sixth round, 171st overall, in the 2011 NHL entry draft by the Senators.

== Playing career ==
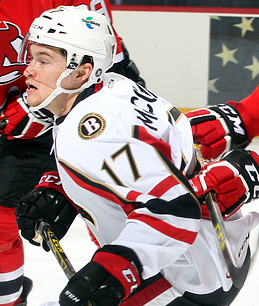
McCormick with the Binghamton Senators in 2015.

McCormick grew up in the Green Bay area with his younger brother Sam, and played high school hockey for Notre Dame Academy before moving to the Sioux City Musketeers of the United States Hockey League (USHL). He was selected by the Ottawa Senators in the sixth round of the 2011 NHL entry draft. He then committed to a collegiate career attending and playing for Ohio State University for three years. On May 28, 2014, he was signed to a two-year, entry-level contract with the Senators.

McCormick turned professional in 2014 with the Binghamton Senators of the American Hockey League (AHL). McCormick made his National Hockey League (NHL) debut on October 25, 2015, with Ottawa in a 4–1 loss to the Arizona Coyotes.

On February 6, 2019, McCormick was traded to the Colorado Avalanche in exchange for J.C. Beaudin. He was immediately assigned to the team's AHL affiliate, the Colorado Eagles. McCormick played out the remainder of the 2018–19 season with the Eagles, adding 8 points in 25 regular season games and making two postseason appearances in the 2019 Calder Cup playoffs.

McCormick then signed a one-year, two-way contract with the Carolina Hurricanes on July 25, 2019. In the following 2019–20 season, upon returning from injury, he was assigned to the Charlotte Checkers, Carolina's AHL affiliate. McCormick collected 16 goals and 35 points in 56 games before the remainder of the season was canceled due to the COVID-19 pandemic. On October 28, 2020, McCormick signed a one-year, two-way contract extension.

On September 29, 2021, McCormick signed a one-year, entry-level contract with the Seattle Kraken, the NHL's expansion team for the 2021–22 season.

Prior to the 2022–23 season, McCormick was named captain of the Kraken's new AHL affiliate, the Coachella Valley Firebirds.

After missing the entire 2025–26 season due to his recovery from hip surgery, McCormick announced his retirement from professional hockey, at the age of 34.

== Career statistics ==
			Regular season					Playoffs
Season	Team	League	GP	G	A	Pts	PIM	GP	G	A	Pts	PIM
2007–08	Notre Dame Academy	FRCC	18	18	19	37	70	—	—	—	—	—
2008–09	Notre Dame Academy	FRCC	20	21	38	59	32	2	2	2	4	0
2009–10	Notre Dame Academy	FRCC	29	38	37	75	74	—	—	—	—	—
2010–11	Sioux City Musketeers	USHL	55	21	21	42	102	3	1	2	3	4
2011–12	Ohio State University	CCHA	27	10	12	22	31	—	—	—	—	—
2012–13	Ohio State University	CCHA	40	15	16	31	26	—	—	—	—	—
2013–14	Ohio State University	B1G	37	11	24	35	40	—	—	—	—	—
2014–15	Binghamton Senators	AHL	62	10	10	20	133	—	—	—	—	—
2015–16	Binghamton Senators	AHL	57	15	15	30	143	—	—	—	—	—
2015–16	Ottawa Senators	NHL	20	2	2	4	37	—	—	—	—	—
2016–17	Binghamton Senators	AHL	66	21	15	36	105	—	—	—	—	—
2016–17	Ottawa Senators	NHL	7	0	0	0	0	—	—	—	—	—
2017–18	Belleville Senators	AHL	49	8	19	27	80	—	—	—	—	—
2017–18	Ottawa Senators	NHL	30	3	2	5	37	—	—	—	—	—
2018–19	Ottawa Senators	NHL	14	1	0	1	4	—	—	—	—	—
2018–19	Belleville Senators	AHL	20	7	5	12	19	—	—	—	—	—
2018–19	Colorado Eagles	AHL	25	2	6	8	41	2	0	0	0	0
2019–20	Charlotte Checkers	AHL	56	16	19	35	120	—	—	—	—	—
2020–21	Carolina Hurricanes	NHL	12	2	1	3	9	—	—	—	—	—
2020–21	Chicago Wolves	AHL	1	0	0	0	0	—	—	—	—	—
2021–22	Charlotte Checkers	AHL	46	13	16	29	42	7	4	3	7	23
2021–22	Seattle Kraken	NHL	10	0	0	0	10	—	—	—	—	—
2022–23	Coachella Valley Firebirds	AHL	71	28	39	67	76	26	14	13	27	16
2023–24	Coachella Valley Firebirds	AHL	68	32	28	60	61	18	8	3	11	28
2023–24	Seattle Kraken	NHL	1	0	0	0	0	—	—	—	—	—
2024–25	Coachella Valley Firebirds	AHL	19	7	6	13	13	—	—	—	—	—
NHL totals			94	8	5	13	97	—	—	—	—	—
