= Cameron Hughes (ice hockey) =

Canadian ice hockey player (born 1996)

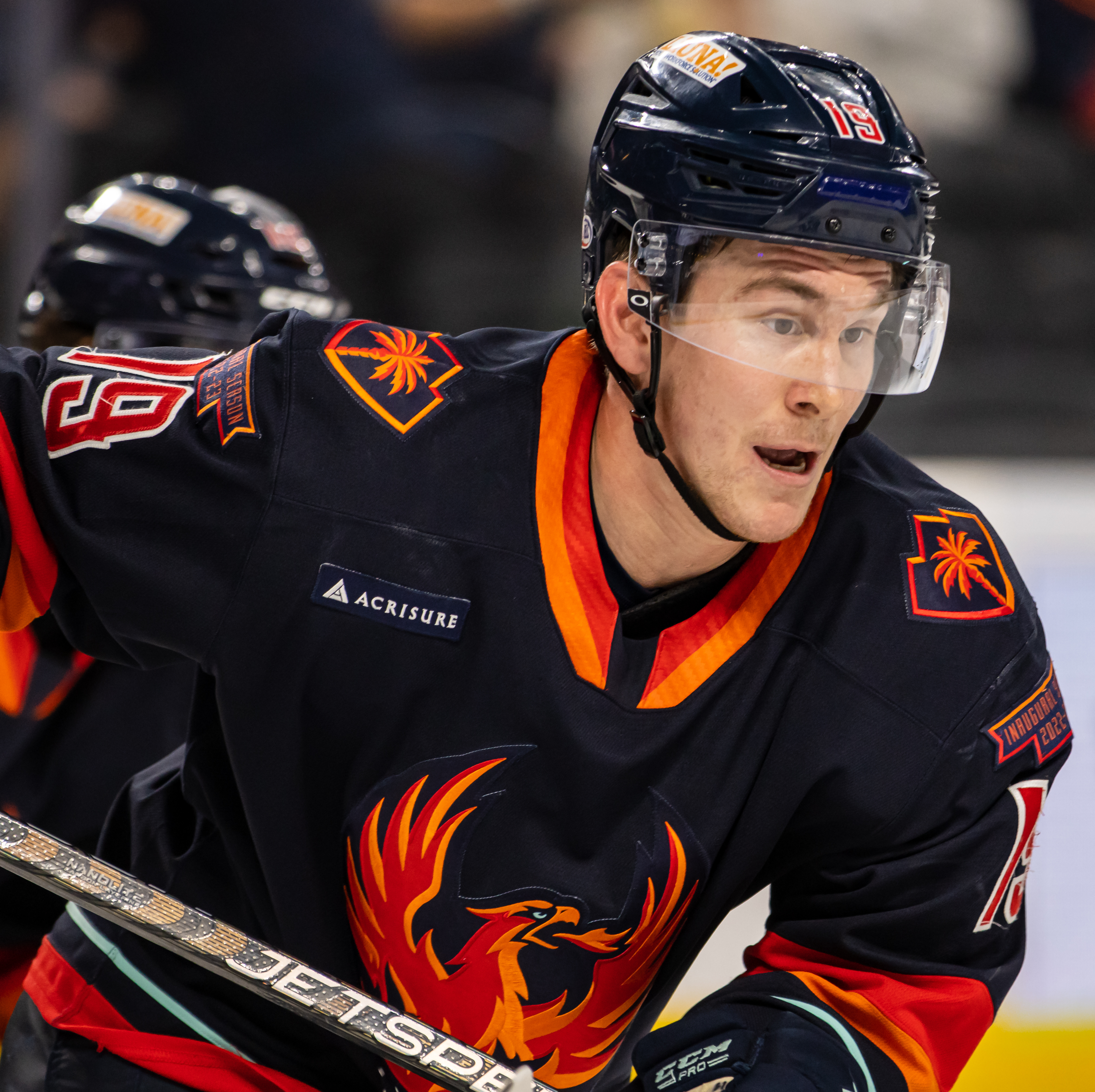
- Hughes with the Coachella Valley Firebirds in 2023.
- Born: October 9, 1996 (age 30) Edmonton, Alberta, Canada
- Height: 5 ft 11 in (180 cm)
- Weight: 175 lb (79 kg; 12 st 7 lb)
- Position: Centre
- Shoots: Left
- NHL team (P) Cur. team Former teams: Dallas Stars; Texas Stars (AHL); Boston Bruins
- NHL draft: 165th overall, 2015; Boston Bruins
- Playing career: 2018–present

Cameron Hughes (born October 9, 1996) is a Canadian professional ice hockey forward currently playing with the Texas Stars in the American Hockey League (AHL) while under contract to the Dallas Stars of the National Hockey League (NHL).

== Personal life ==
Hughes was born on October 9, 1996, in Edmonton Alberta, to parents Brian and Pauline. Hughes has three younger brothers; Ryan, Liam, and Ethan, who all play ice hockey. Growing up in Edmonton, Hughes played with the Canadian Athletic Club Midget Hockey program of the Alberta Midget Hockey League (AMHL) and the Spruce Grove Saints of the Alberta Junior Hockey League. During his time in the AMHL, Hughes was drafted by the Swift Current Broncos of the Western Hockey League (WHL). Instead of joining the Broncos, he played with the Saints and tallied 31 points in 60 regular season games and 9 points in 14 playoff games as he helped the Saints to the AJHL finals. In 2014, Hughes was named to the Reebok North Division All-League Team. Later that year, he committed to play collegiate ice hockey for the Wisconsin Badgers men's ice hockey team.

== Playing career ==
Hughes played for the Wisconsin Badgers at the University of Wisconsin from 2014 to 2018. There, he majored in agricultural and applied economics/agricultural business management. The Badgers had a disappointing 2014–15 season and began the year with the second-worst record amongst the 59 schools competing in NCAA Division I. As a result, during the winter break, Hughes debated joining the Broncos in the WHL instead of returning to college. However, he returned to the University of Wisconsin and finished the season with three goals and 10 assists for 13 points through 34 games. Following his freshman season, Hughes was ranked 196th overall amongst North American skaters by the NHL Central Scouting Bureau. He was eventually drafted 165th overall by the Boston Bruins in the 2015 NHL entry draft. After attending their development camp, Hughes returned to Wisconsin for his sophomore season.

During the offseason following his sophomore season, Hughes participated in the Bruins' 2016 Development Camp. Upon returning to the Badgers, Hughes tallied a 12-game point streak which tied the programs longest streak record. At the conclusion of his junior season, Hughes had tallied a team-high seven goals and 25 assists, earning him the teams' Fenton Kelsey Jr.-Mike Richter Most Competitive Award. He was also appointed team captain for the 2017–18 season.

Prior to returning for his senior season, Hughes underwent shoulder surgery during the offseason and spent the first three weeks participating in limited team practices. On March 10, 2018, Hughes concluded his collegiate career by signing an entry-level contract with the Boston Bruins.

=== Professional ===
Hughes made his NHL debut with the Boston Bruins on November 4, 2019, during a game against the Pittsburgh Penguins as a replacement for fourth-liner David Backes.

On July 7, 2021, Hughes signed a one-year, two-way contract extension to remain with the Bruins organization.

As a free agent from the Bruins after parts of five seasons, Hughes signed a two-year, two-way contract with the Seattle Kraken on July 13, 2022.

Hughes scored the first ever goal at the Coachella Valley Firebirds' home arena, Acrisure Arena, on December 18, 2022. Hughes would also be part of a Firebirds team that made it to the Calder Cup final in their inaugural season, before they fell to the Hershey Bears in seven games.

On July 1, 2024, Hughes signed as a free agent to a one-year, two-way contract with the Dallas Stars for the 2024–25 season.

== Career statistics ==
			Regular season					Playoffs
Season	Team	League	GP	G	A	Pts	PIM	GP	G	A	Pts	PIM
2011–12	CAC Edmonton Canadiens	AMHL	32	8	23	31	24	—	—	—	—	—
2012–13	Spruce Grove Saints	AJHL	60	11	20	31	42	14	3	6	9	11
2013–14	Spruce Grove Saints	AJHL	52	21	36	57	58	18	1	16	17	2
2014–15	U. of Wisconsin	B1G	34	3	10	13	35	—	—	—	—	—
2015–16	U. of Wisconsin	B1G	32	5	20	25	12	—	—	—	—	—
2016–17	U. of Wisconsin	B1G	36	7	25	32	16	—	—	—	—	—
2017–18	U. of Wisconsin	B1G	37	8	14	22	18	—	—	—	—	—
2017–18	Providence Bruins	AHL	14	0	3	3	6	—	—	—	—	—
2018–19	Providence Bruins	AHL	52	13	15	28	28	4	0	0	0	0
2019–20	Providence Bruins	AHL	44	6	10	16	17	—	—	—	—	—
2019–20	Boston Bruins	NHL	1	0	0	0	0	—	—	—	—	—
2020–21	Providence Bruins	AHL	25	5	16	21	14	—	—	—	—	—
2020–21	Boston Bruins	NHL	1	0	0	0	0	—	—	—	—	—
2021–22	Providence Bruins	AHL	59	14	31	45	39	—	—	—	—	—
2022–23	Coachella Valley Firebirds	AHL	61	19	37	56	57	26	4	19	23	14
2023–24	Coachella Valley Firebirds	AHL	69	25	32	57	56	18	0	16	16	9
2024–25	Texas Stars	AHL	69	23	34	57	59	14	4	15	19	7
2025–26	Texas Stars	AHL	65	17	51	68	48	5	1	5	6	4
2025–26	Dallas Stars	NHL	3	1	0	1	0	—	—	—	—	—
NHL totals			5	1	0	1	0	—	—	—	—	—

== Awards and honours ==
Award	Year
AJHL
South All-Star Team	2014
