= Gustav Olofsson =

Swedish ice hockey player (born 1994)

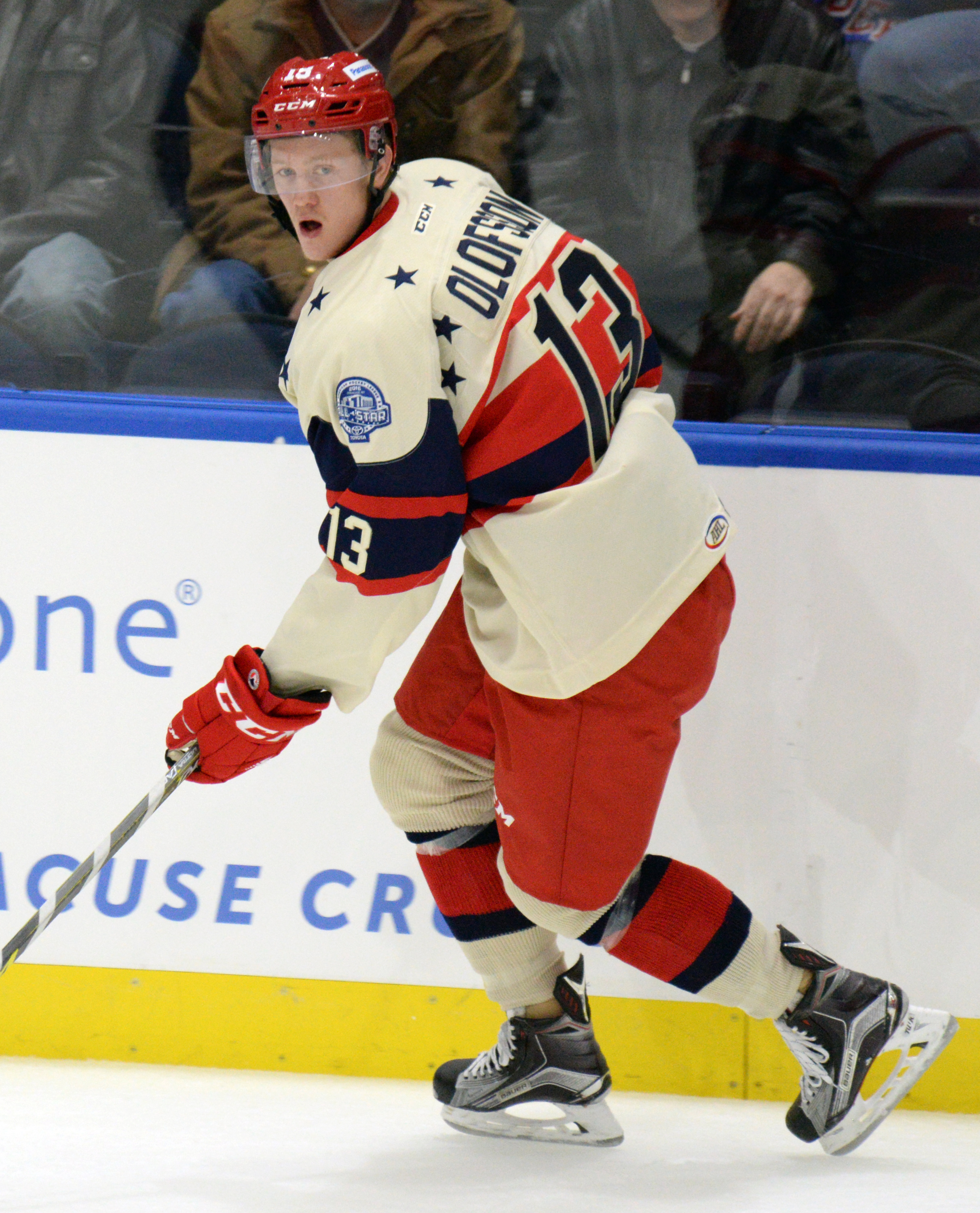
- Olofsson at the 2016 AHL All-Star Game
- Born: 1 December 1994 (age 31) Borås, Sweden
- Height: 6 ft 2 in (188 cm)
- Weight: 190 lb (86 kg; 13 st 8 lb)
- Position: Defense
- Shoots: Left
- AHL team Former teams: Coachella Valley Firebirds; Minnesota Wild; Montreal Canadiens; Seattle Kraken
- NHL draft: 46th overall, 2013; Minnesota Wild
- Playing career: 2014–present

Gustav Olofsson (born 1 December 1994) is a Swedish professional ice hockey defenceman for the Coachella Valley Firebirds in the American Hockey League (AHL). He was selected in the second round, 46th overall, by the Minnesota Wild in the 2013 NHL entry draft. Olofsson has also previously played for the Montreal Canadiens and Seattle Kraken.

== Playing career ==
On 24 March 2014, following one season of NCAA play with Colorado College, the Minnesota Wild of the National Hockey League (NHL) signed Olofsson to a three-year entry-level contract starting with the 2014–15 season, but was immediately assigned to begin his professional career with the Iowa Wild in the American Hockey League (AHL). Olofsson was called up to the NHL for the first time on November 19, 2015, where he subsequently made his debut that night in a 4–2 loss to the Boston Bruins.

In June 2017, Olofsson signed a two-year, $1.45 million contract with the Wild.

On October 3, 2018, Olofsson was traded to the Montreal Canadiens in exchange for prospect William Bitten.

Oloffson spent three seasons within the Canadiens organization, before leaving as a free agent to sign a one-year, two-way contract with expansion club, the Seattle Kraken, on 25 August 2021.

After three seasons under contract with the Kraken, Olofsson was not re-signed to an NHL contract however continued within the organization in signing a two-year deal to continue his tenure with AHL affiliate, the Coachella Valley Firebirds, on July 15, 2025.

== International play ==
Olofsson played with Sweden at the 2014 World Junior Ice Hockey Championships where he was his team's top scoring defenseman. He helped Sweden capture the Silver medal finishing with 5 points in 7 games.

== Personal life ==
His younger brother, Fredrik, was drafted by the Chicago Blackhawks in the 2014 NHL entry draft and played within the Colorado Avalanche organization after being traded from the Dallas Stars for future considerations. He now plays for Rogle BK Angelholm of the Swehl

== Career statistics ==
=== Regular season and playoffs ===
			Regular season					Playoffs
Season	Team	League	GP	G	A	Pts	PIM	GP	G	A	Pts	PIM
2011–12	Green Bay Gamblers	USHL	3	0	1	1	0	—	—	—	—	—
2012–13	Green Bay Gamblers	USHL	63	2	21	23	59	4	0	0	0	0
2013–14	Colorado College	NCHC	30	4	4	8	20	—	—	—	—	—
2013–14	Iowa Wild	AHL	8	1	0	1	2	—	—	—	—	—
2014–15	Iowa Wild	AHL	1	0	0	0	0	—	—	—	—	—
2015–16	Iowa Wild	AHL	52	2	15	17	12	—	—	—	—	—
2015–16	Minnesota Wild	NHL	2	0	0	0	0	—	—	—	—	—
2016–17	Iowa Wild	AHL	59	6	18	24	32	—	—	—	—	—
2016–17	Minnesota Wild	NHL	13	0	3	3	2	—	—	—	—	—
2017–18	Minnesota Wild	NHL	41	0	8	8	14	—	—	—	—	—
2018–19	Laval Rocket	AHL	2	0	1	1	0	—	—	—	—	—
2019–20	Laval Rocket	AHL	57	1	15	16	18	—	—	—	—	—
2019–20	Montreal Canadiens	NHL	3	0	0	0	2	—	—	—	—	—
2020–21	Laval Rocket	AHL	24	1	11	12	11	—	—	—	—	—
2021–22	Charlotte Checkers	AHL	41	2	7	9	32	7	1	2	3	6
2022–23	Coachella Valley Firebirds	AHL	20	1	5	6	8	26	3	2	5	10
2022–23	Seattle Kraken	NHL	3	0	0	0	0	—	—	—	—	—
2023–24	Coachella Valley Firebirds	AHL	51	1	11	12	18	18	0	5	5	8
2023–24	Seattle Kraken	NHL	1	0	0	0	0	—	—	—	—	—
2024–25	Coachella Valley Firebirds	AHL	51	3	14	17	24	6	1	0	1	2
2025–26	Coachella Valley Firebirds	AHL	48	4	28	32	28	12	0	5	5	8
NHL totals			63	0	11	11	18	—	—	—	—	—

=== International ===
Year	Team	Event	Result	GP	G	A	Pts	PIM
2014	Sweden	WJC	2nd place, silver medalist(s)	7	1	4	5	2
Junior totals				7	1	4	5	2

== Awards and honours ==
Award	Year
USHL
All-Rookie Team	2012–13
