= Coachella Valley Firebirds =

American Hockey League team in Thousand Palms, California

- City: Thousand Palms, California
- League: American Hockey League
- Conference: Western
- Division: Pacific
- Founded: 2022
- Home arena: Acrisure Arena
- Colors: Deep sea blue, red alert, orange, ice blue
- Mascot: Fuego
- Owner: Oak View Group
- General manager: Troy Bodie
- Head coach: Derek Laxdal
- Captain: John Hayden
- Media: The Desert Sun; KDGL
- Affiliates: Seattle Kraken (NHL); Kansas City Mavericks (ECHL)
- Website: cvfirebirds.com

Championships
- Division titles: 1 (2023–24)
- Conference titles: 2 (2023, 2024)

Current uniform

The Coachella Valley Firebirds are a professional ice hockey team based in the Coachella Valley. They are members of the Pacific Division in the Western Conference of the American Hockey League (AHL). The Firebirds began play in the 2022–23 season as an expansion franchise. The team is an owned-and-operated affiliate of the National Hockey League (NHL)'s Seattle Kraken. The team plays their home games at Acrisure Arena in Thousand Palms, California.

After the approval of the Kraken to join the NHL, the Kraken's ownership group had narrowed down its AHL affiliate options to promoting the ECHL's Idaho Steelheads in Boise, Idaho, or a new expansion team in Palm Springs, California. On June 26, 2019, it was reported the Seattle ownership group had chosen Palm Springs as the site for Seattle's AHL affiliate.

The Firebirds ranked second overall in their first regular season, behind only the Calgary Wranglers. During that season's Calder Cup playoffs, the Firebirds reached the Finals and lost in overtime of game seven to the Hershey Bears. They finished as runners-up again in their second season, achieving 103 points in the regular season and reaching the Finals before losing to the Bears again, this time in overtime of game six.

== History ==
=== Establishment (2018–2022) ===
On December 4, 2018, the National Hockey League (NHL) Board of Governors voted unanimously to approve a Seattle NHL expansion team, the Seattle Kraken, to begin play in the 2021–22 season. The new ownership group then began making plans for acquiring a minor league affiliate in the American Hockey League (AHL). By early 2019, they had narrowed down their options to promoting the ECHL's Idaho Steelheads in Boise, Idaho, or a new expansion team in the area around Palm Springs, California. On June 26, it was reported the Seattle ownership group had chosen Palm Springs as the site for their AHL affiliate, as the Boise option would require the Steelheads' arena to be revamped. The expansion franchise was approved by the AHL Board of Governors on September 30, with plans to begin play in the 2021–22 season. Delays associated with the construction of an arena in the Palm Springs area caused the team's debut to be pushed back to the 2022–23 season. In the meantime, Seattle affiliated with the Charlotte Checkers for the 2021–22 season, sharing the team with the Florida Panthers.

In November 2021, the new team revealed its name, the Coachella Valley Firebirds, as well as its logos and colors, at a ceremony held on the construction site of their new arena. Since the Kraken was a mythical creature, the organization chose another mythical creature for its affiliate.

On June 21, 2022, Dan Bylsma, who had won the Stanley Cup with the Pittsburgh Penguins in 2009, was named the inaugural head coach of the Firebirds. The Firebirds signed their first free agents, Samuel Bucek and Ian McKinnon, on July 11. On the day of the Firebirds' first game, October 16, Max McCormick was announced as the team's captain, with Andrew Poturalski and Gustav Olofsson being named alternate captains.

=== First seasons (2022–present) ===
The Firebirds played their first game on October 16, 2022, a 6–5 win against the Calgary Wranglers, and they also won the rematch the next day. During the first stretch of the season later that month, the Firebirds played their home games in the Seattle metropolitan area, playing four games against the Abbotsford Canucks and the Wranglers at the Kraken Community Iceplex and Climate Pledge Arena in Seattle, as well as the Angel of the Winds Arena in Everett. The Firebirds' first game at Acrisure Arena took place on December 18, a 4–3 win in front of a 10,087-people sellout crowd against the Tucson Roadrunners, with Cameron Hughes scoring the first ever home goal for the Firebirds, at the 8:49 mark in the first period. From December 22, 2022, to January 26, 2023, the Firebirds achieved a fourteen-game points streak, the current franchise record. During the season, Tye Kartye was one of only eight rookies league-wide to play in all 72 games during the regular season, and he recorded 57 points, leading all rookies in scoring. Following the season he was awarded the Dudley "Red" Garrett Memorial Award for being the most outstanding rookie, and he was named to the AHL All-Rookie Team. The Firebirds finished the 2022–23 season with 103 points, good for second place of the Pacific Division, behind only the Wranglers, who captured the Macgregor Kilpatrick Trophy. During the 2023 Calder Cup playoffs, the Firebirds captured the Western Conference title and advanced to the Calder Cup Finals, where they faced off against the Hershey Bears. Goaltender Joey Daccord recorded back-to-back shutouts in the first two games of the series, but the Firebirds fell short of the championship, losing in overtime of game seven.

On March 23, 2024, during the 2023–24 season, the Firebirds clinched a berth in the 2024 Calder Cup playoffs following a 4–3 shootout loss to the San Diego Gulls. The Firebirds went on to win their first Pacific Division title, earning a bye in the first round of the Calder Cup playoffs following a 3–1 win on April 10, 2024, over the Ontario Reign. During the 2024 Calder Cup playoffs, the Firebirds again captured the Western Conference title and progressed to the Calder Cup Finals, where they once again faced the Hershey Bears. For the second straight season, the Firebirds could not reach the championship, losing in overtime of game six. After the season, on May 28, Firebirds head coach Dan Bylsma was made the head coach of the Seattle Kraken, and the position in Coachella Valley was replaced by Derek Laxdal.

During the 2024–25 season, the Firebirds finished the season with 84 points, good for fourth place in their division as well as a playoff spot. This was in part due to Nikke Kokko, a rookie goaltender who tallied 20 wins and was named to the AHL All-Rookie Team. During the 2025 Calder Cup playoffs, the Firebirds swept the two-game series against the Calgary Wranglers after a shutout from Kokko, but they lost the first round series to the Abbostford Canucks three games to one. The Firebirds once again finished fourth in their division in the 2025–26 season, but with 88 points. During the season, Tyson Jugnauth, a defenseman, was named to the AHL All-Rookie Team after notching 70 points. In the 2026 Calder Cup playoffs, the Firebirds made it to the second round, losing to the Colorado Eagles. On June 10, 2026, it was announced that after missing the entire season due to his recovery from hip surgery, inaugural captain Max McCormick would retire from professional hockey.

== Arena ==
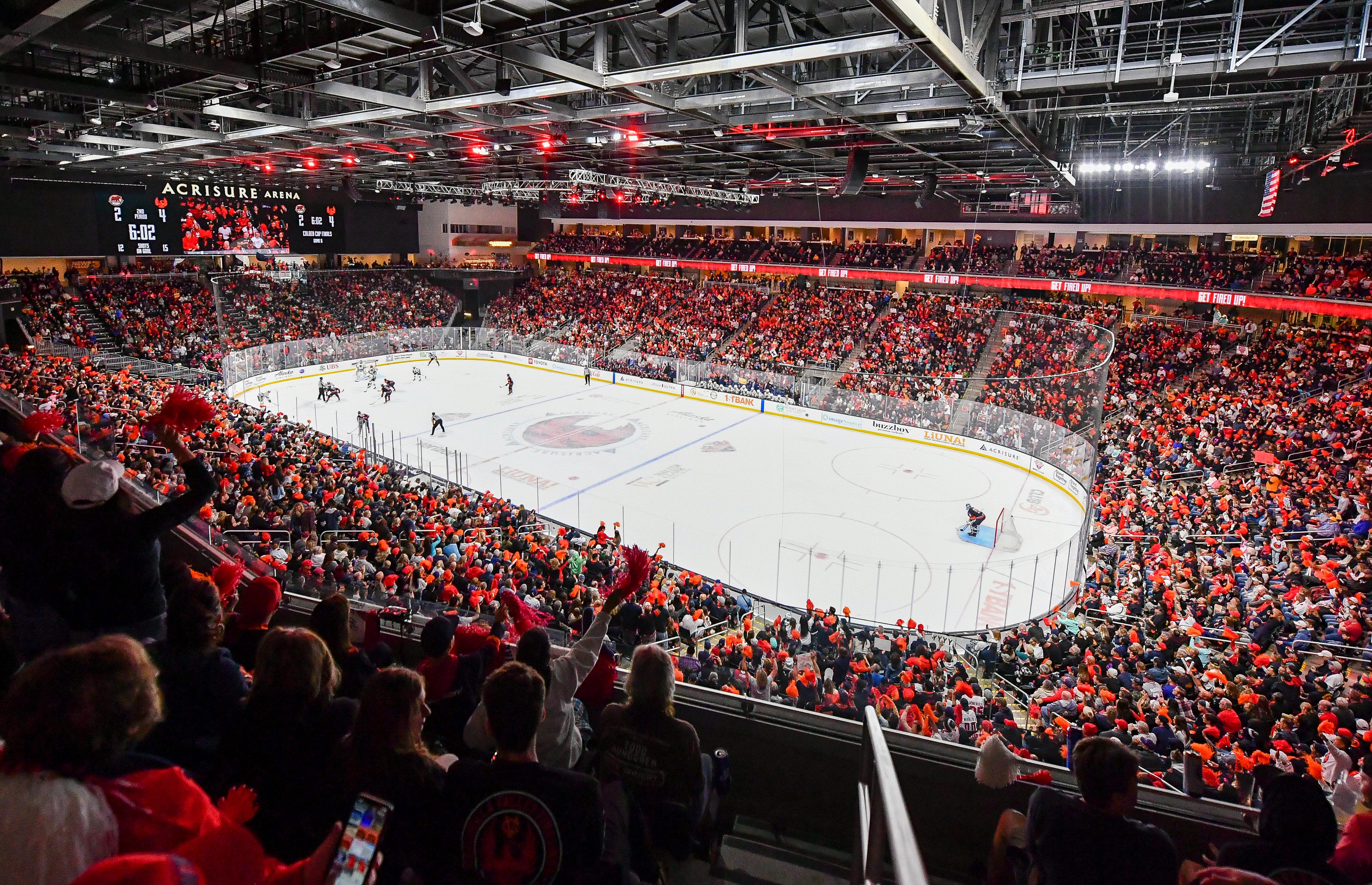
Interior of Acrisure Arena during Game 6 of the 2023 Calder Cup Finals

The Firebirds play their home games at Acrisure Arena, an 11,000-seat venue north of Palm Desert in the unincorporated area of Thousand Palms, California.

After Palm Springs was chosen as the site of Seattle's AHL affiliate, Oak View Group (OVG) announced a partnership in June 2019 with the Agua Caliente Band of Cahuilla Indians to build a 10,000-seat arena. The multi-purpose venue would be built on land owned by the Agua Caliente Band adjacent to the Spa Resort Casino and was estimated to cost $250 million. It would also have had an adjoining facility to serve as a year-round community gathering space as well as the training center for the AHL team.

Groundbreaking and construction on the arena was expected to begin in February 2020, with completion by late 2021, but was put on hold due to the COVID-19 pandemic and the resulting ban on large gatherings including concerts and sporting events. By September 2020, OVG's negotiations with the tribe had come to a halt and the agreement was ended due to COVID-19 financial impacts on the tribe.

On September 16, 2020, OVG and the H.N. and Frances C. Berger Foundation announced they had chosen a new location for the arena in the middle of the Coachella Valley in unincorporated Thousand Palms, but it would not open until at least 2022. The arena site is on Foundation land between Interstate 10 and the Foundation's Classic Club golf course; the land would be leased by OVG from the Foundation. Groundbreaking on the project took place on June 2, 2021. The arena hosted its first game on December 18, 2022, after a year of construction at an estimated cost of $290 million.

During the 2023 Calder Cup playoffs, the Firebirds established an American Hockey League record for total playoff attendance with 138,053 fans attending 16 postseason games. On January 6, 2024, the AHL announced that the Firebirds and Acrisure Arena would host the 2025 AHL All-Star Game.

== Uniforms ==
The Firebirds announced their inaugural season uniforms on January 24, 2022, at the Palm Springs Air Museum. They were delivered by the Seattle Kraken, the jerseys themselves in treasure chests. The Firebirds have two main uniforms, one a dark blue color and the other white. Both uniforms feature the Firebirds logo in the center, as well as red, orange, and light-blue stripes around the sleeves, with red and light-blue stripes in the bottom. The blue eye color of the Firebird logo is a tie-in to the blue used by the Kraken. The Kraken logo adorns one shoulder.

On November 8, 2023, the team revealed their "Red Alert" third jersey in red with orange, black and light blue trim. The regular logo is replaced with the team's secondary logo, which depicts a mountain range with a palm tree in front. The palm tree has nine fronds, one for each city in the Coachella Valley. During the 2022–23 season, the team wore the jersey on most Sunday home games.

== Mascot ==
The Firebirds' mascot is an orange, feathered bird named Fuego (Spanish for fire). Fuego was announced on August 4, 2022, before the start of the season. Fuego wears a Firebirds jersey, featuring the number 22 on the back. His first game appearance was on October 16.

== Broadcasting ==
=== Radio ===
All Firebirds games are broadcast on KDGL (106.9 FM). The network broadcast all 72 games of the Firebirds' inaugural season.

=== Television ===
When the Firebirds began play, the News-Press & Gazette Company stations of KESQ-TV, KDFX-CD, and KCWQ-LD split a 10-game package. In 2024, the Firebirds and Entravision Communications, owner of NBC affiliate KMIR-TV and KPSE-LD, reached a new media agreement. KPSE-LD was rebranded My Firebirds TV and became the broadcaster of all 36 regular-season home contests.

== Season-by-season record ==
Regular season											Playoffs					
Season	Games	Won	Lost	OTL	SOL	Points	PCT	Goals for	Goals against	Standing	Year	Prelims	1st round	2nd round	3rd round	Finals
2022–23	72	48	17	5	2	103	.715	257	194	2nd, Pacific	2023	W, 2–1, TUC	W, 3–2, COL	W, 3–2, CGY	W, 4–2, MIL	L, 3–4, HER
2023–24	72	46	15	6	5	103	.715	252	182	1st, Pacific	2024	BYE	W, 3–1, CGY	W, 3–0, ONT	W, 4–1, MIL	L, 2–4, HER
2024–25	72	37	25	5	5	84	.583	225	205	4th, Pacific	2025	W, 2–0, CGY	L, 1–3, ABB	—	—	—
2025–26	72	41	25	6	0	88	.611	235	218	4th, Pacific	2026	W, 2–1, BAK	W, 3–2, ONT	L, 1–3, COL	—	—

== Players and personnel ==
=== Current roster ===
Updated October 1, 2026.

No.	Nat	Player	Pos	S/G	Age	Acquired	Birthplace	Contract
10	(Canada)	Jon-Randall Avon	C	L	23	2025	Peterborough, Ontario	Kraken
84	(Canada)	Alexis Bernier	D	R	20	2026	Saint-Hyacinthe, Quebec	Kraken
2	(Canada)	Lukas Dragicevic	D	R	21	2025	Richmond, British Columbia	Kraken
27	(Canada)	Ryden Evers	C	L	21	2026	Burnaby, British Columbia	Kraken
57	(Canada)	Jagger Firkus	RW	R	22	2023	Irma, Alberta	Kraken
78	(Denmark)	Oscar Fisker Molgaard	C	L	21	2025	Hjørring, Denmark	Kraken
47	(Canada)	Kaden Hammell	D	R	21	2025	Langley, British Columbia	Kraken
15	(United States)	John Hayden (C)	C	R	31	2022	Chicago, Illinois	Kraken
43	(Canada)	Tyson Jugnauth	D	L	22	2025	Toronto, Ontario	Kraken
13	(United States)	Devin Kaplan	RW	R	22	2026	Bridgewater, New Jersey	Kraken
35	(Finland)	Nikke Kokko	G	R	22	2023	Oulu, Finland	Kraken
72	(Belarus)	Andrei Loshko	RW	L	22	2025	Zhlobin, Belarus	Kraken
21	(Canada)	Ian McKinnon	C	L	28	2022	Whitby, Ontario	Firebirds
49	(Finland)	Julius Miettinen	C	L	20	2026	Helsinki, Finland	Kraken
96	(Canada)	Logan Morrison (A)	C	R	24	2023	Guelph, Ontario	Kraken
24	(Canada)	Ty Nelson (A)	D	R	22	2024	Toronto, Ontario	Kraken
68	(Canada)	Jakov Novak	LW	L	27	2025	Windsor, Ontario	Firebirds
33	(Finland)	Jani Nyman	RW	L	22	2024	Valkeakoski, Finland	Kraken
23	(Sweden)	Gustav Olofsson (A)	D	L	31	2022	Borås, Sweden	Firebirds
40	(Finland)	Victor Ostman	G	R	26	2024	Danderyd, Sweden	Kraken
4	(Canada)	Caden Price	D	L	21	2025	Saskatoon, Saskatchewan	Kraken
16	(Canada)	Carson Rehkopf	C	L	21	2025	Barrie, Ontario	Kraken
29	(United States)	Lleyton Roed	LW	L	24	2024	White Bear Lake, Minnesota	Kraken
12	(Czech Republic)	Eduard Sale	F	L	21	2024	Brno, Czech Republic	Kraken
67	(Canada)	Mitchell Stephens (A)	C	R	29	2024	Peterborough, Ontario	Firebirds
90	(Canada)	Nathan Villeneuve	C	L	20	2026	Ottawa, Ontario	Kraken

=== Owners ===
The team is owned by Oak View Group, the organization that also owns Climate Pledge Arena. Tim Leiweke serves as their CEO. Steve Fraser served as president of the Firebirds and Acrisure Arena from 2021 to 2023. His work established the team in the region, broke numerous AHL records for revenue and attendance and secured the location of the 2025 AHL All-Star Game to be in Coachella Valley.

=== Head coaches ===
- Dan Bylsma, 2022–24
- Derek Laxdal, 2024–present

=== Team captains ===
- Max McCormick, 2022–26
- John Hayden, 2026–present

== Team and league honors ==
=== League awards ===
- John D. Chick Trophy (2023–24)
- Norman R. "Bud" Poile Trophy (2023-24)
- Robert W. Clarke Trophy (2023, 2024)
