= Zac Leslie =

Canadian ice hockey player (born 1994)

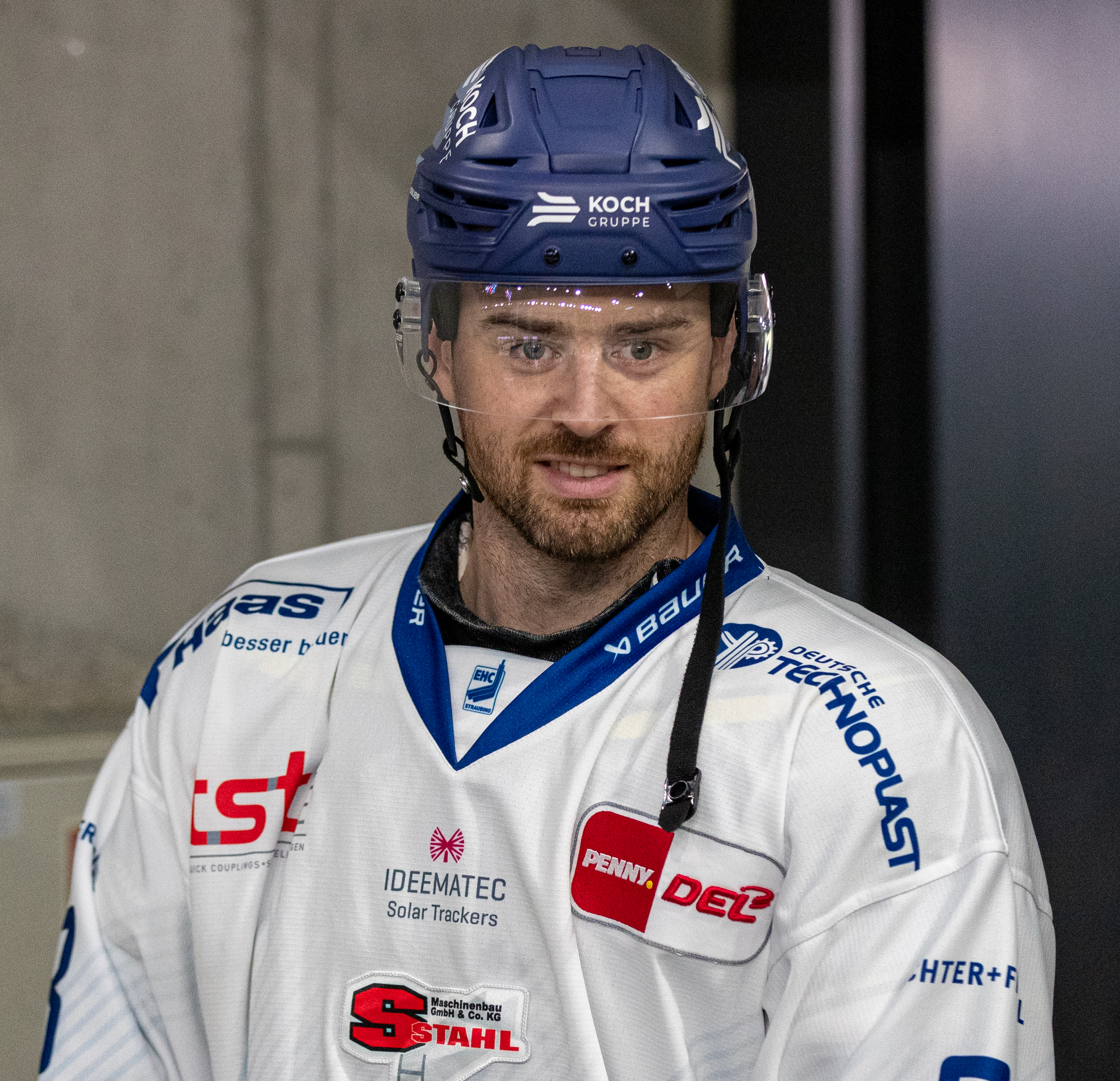
- Leslie in 2025
- Born: January 31, 1994 (age 32) Ottawa, Ontario, Canada
- Height: 6 ft 0 in (183 cm)
- Weight: 174 lb (79 kg; 12 st 6 lb)
- Position: Defence
- Shoots: Left
- ICEHL team Former teams: Bozen–Bolzano; Ontario Reign; Chicago Wolves; Stockton Heat; Belleville Senators; Kunlun Red Star; Rapperswil-Jona Lakers; Adler Mannheim; Straubing Tigers
- NHL draft: 178th overall, 2013; Los Angeles Kings
- Playing career: 2015–present

Zachary Leslie (born January 31, 1994) is a Canadian professional ice hockey player who is a defenceman for Bozen–Bolzano of the ICE Hockey League (ICEHL).

He was drafted 178th overall by the Los Angeles Kings in the sixth round of the 2013 NHL entry draft and previously played for the Ontario Reign, Chicago Wolves, Stockton Heat and Belleville Senators of the American Hockey League (AHL).

== Playing career ==
=== Junior ===
After playing minor hockey in Ottawa, Leslie was drafted 63rd overall by the Guelph Storm in the 2010 OHL Priority Selection.

In his Ontario Hockey League (OHL) debut on September 22, 2017, Leslie made his first OHL assist in a 6–3 win against the Windsor Spitfires. On November 19, 2011, he made his first OHL goal in a 5–0 win against the Erie Otters. Overall, he played 65 games with two goals and 15 assists in his rookie season. He improved his numbers in his sophomore season, playing 68 games with 12 goals and 28 assists. For the 2013–14 OHL season, Leslie played 60 games with 14 goals and 36 assists, en route to the Storm's third J. Ross Robertson Cup win and 2014 Memorial Cup final appearance.

In his final OHL season, Leslie was selected as an alternate captain of the Guelph Storm, playing 57 games with 11 goals and 37 assists before having season-ending shoulder surgery.

=== Professional ===
Leslie was drafted 113th overall by the Los Angeles Kings in the sixth round of the 2013 NHL entry draft. On October 24, 2015, he made his professional debut with the Kings' AHL affiliate, the Ontario Reign, in a 3–0 win against the San Jose Barracuda, making his first AHL assist. In his rookie 2015–16 AHL season, he ultimately appeared in 30 games, making five assists, and appeared in five ECHL games for the Manchester Monarchs, registering one goal. On October 21, 2016, he made his first professional goal in a 6–5 overtime win against the Texas Stars, eventually playing 65 games with five goals and 18 assists in his sophomore season.

After the 2016–17 AHL season, the Los Angeles Kings signed Leslie to a one-year two-way contract extension on July 14, 2017. On February 5, 2018, in the middle of the 2017–18 AHL season, the Kings traded Leslie to the Vegas Golden Knights in exchange for future considerations; this marked the first-ever trade between the Kings and the Golden Knights.

After the 2017–18 AHL season, the Golden Knights signed Leslie to a one-year two-way contract extension on May 31, 2018. In the 2018–19 season, Leslie played 67 games with two goals and 14 assists for the Knights' AHL affiliate, the Chicago Wolves, en route to the Wolves' fourth Robert W. Clarke Trophy and 2019 Calder Cup Finals appearance.

On July 10, 2019, the Stockton Heat signed Leslie to a one-year AHL contract. As the alternate captain for the Heat, he played 50 games with five goals and 23 assists in the 2019–20 AHL season and was the Heat's nomination for the Yanick Dupre Memorial Award. Leslie signed a one-year contract extension with the Heat on October 21, 2020, playing 30 games with three goals and seven assists in the shortened 2020–21 AHL season.

On August 10, 2021, the Belleville Senators signed Leslie to a one-year AHL contract for the 2021–22 season. On November 14, 2021, the Ottawa Senators signed him to a one-year two-way contract.

As a free agent from the Senators, Leslie opted to move abroad in agreeing to a one-year contract with Chinese club, HC Kunlun Red Star of the KHL, on August 17, 2022.

== Personal life ==
Leslie's sister, Rebecca, is an ice hockey player who played collegiately for Boston University and currently plays professionally for Ottawa of the Professional Women's Hockey League. He also has two younger sisters, Kathryn and Grace. He is studying for his university degree at Athabasca University.

== Career statistics ==
			Regular season					Playoffs
Season	Team	League	GP	G	A	Pts	PIM	GP	G	A	Pts	PIM
2011–12	Guelph Storm	OHL	65	2	15	17	54	5	0	0	0	4
2012–13	Guelph Storm	OHL	68	12	28	40	58	5	0	1	1	4
2013–14	Guelph Storm	OHL	60	14	36	50	39	20	1	9	10	22
2014–15	Guelph Storm	OHL	57	11	37	48	57	—	—	—	—	—
2015–16	Ontario Reign	AHL	30	0	5	5	13	3	0	1	1	2
2015–16	Manchester Monarchs	ECHL	5	1	0	1	2	—	—	—	—	—
2016–17	Ontario Reign	AHL	65	5	18	23	29	5	0	0	0	6
2017–18	Ontario Reign	AHL	26	1	4	5	10	—	—	—	—	—
2017–18	Chicago Wolves	AHL	27	5	12	17	12	3	1	2	3	4
2018–19	Chicago Wolves	AHL	67	2	14	16	32	22	2	4	6	6
2019–20	Stockton Heat	AHL	50	5	23	28	41	—	—	—	—	—
2020–21	Stockton Heat	AHL	30	3	7	10	33	—	—	—	—	—
2021–22	Belleville Senators	AHL	64	4	23	27	69	2	1	0	1	0
2022–23	Kunlun Red Star	KHL	65	8	31	39	73	—	—	—	—	—
2023–24	Kunlun Red Star	KHL	30	3	4	7	10	—	—	—	—	—
2023–24	SC Rapperswil-Jona Lakers	NL	21	3	6	9	4	—	—	—	—	—
2024–25	Adler Mannheim	DEL	12	0	5	5	8	1	0	0	0	0
AHL totals			367	25	108	133	264	35	4	7	11	18
