= Trevor Carrick =

Canadian ice hockey player (born 1994)

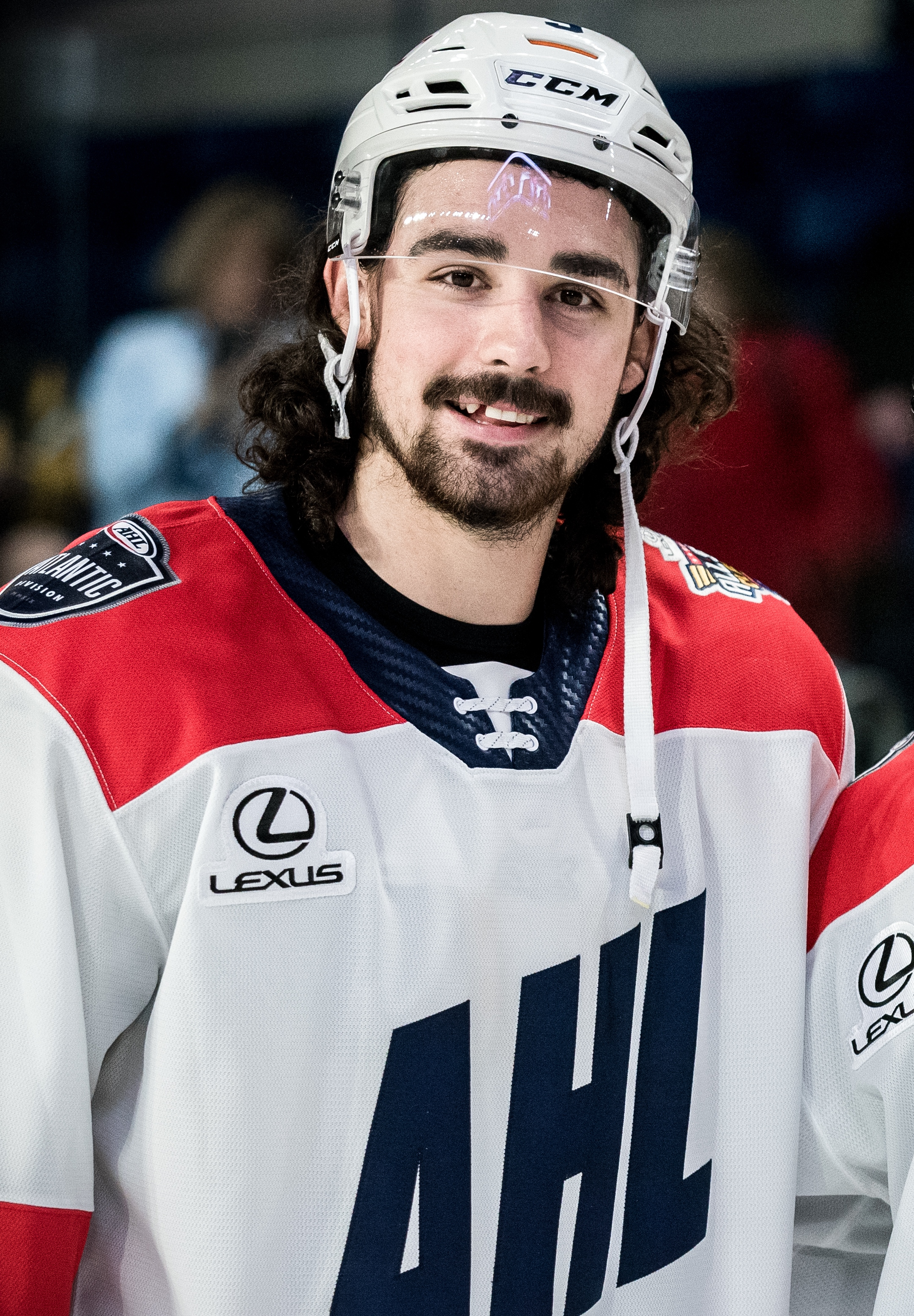
- Carrick at the 2019 AHL All-Star Game
- Born: July 4, 1994 (age 32) Stouffville, Ontario, Canada
- Height: 6 ft 2 in (188 cm)
- Weight: 196 lb (89 kg; 14 st 0 lb)
- Position: Defence
- Shoots: Left
- DEL team Former teams: EHC München; Carolina Hurricanes; San Jose Sharks
- NHL draft: 115th overall, 2012; Carolina Hurricanes
- Playing career: 2014–present

Trevor Carrick (born July 4, 1994) is a Canadian professional ice hockey defenceman who is currently playing with EHC München in the Deutsche Eishockey Liga (DEL). He was selected in the fourth round, 115th overall, by the Carolina Hurricanes in the 2012 NHL entry draft.

== Playing career ==
Carrick played major junior hockey in the Ontario Hockey League (OHL) with the Mississauga St. Michael's Majors/Mississauga Steelheads and the Sudbury Wolves. After completing his lone season with the Majors, Carrick was selected in the fourth round, 115th overall, by the Carolina Hurricanes of the National Hockey League (NHL) during the 2012 NHL entry draft. On December 18, 2013, the Hurricanes signed Carrick to a three-year, entry-level contract.

Carrick had a breakout season with the Charlotte Checkers, the American Hockey League (AHL) affiliate of the Hurricanes, during the 2015–16 season. He recorded a career-high 42 points in 70 games and was named to the AHL All-Star Game. Carrick also received his first NHL recall by the Hurricanes on March 15, 2016. He made his NHL debut the following day against the Washington Capitals. In the 2017–18 season, Carrick played appeared in one game for Carolina, spending the majority of the season with Charlotte. He led all Checkers' defencemen in scoring with 11 goals and 44 points in 73 games. On May 29, 2018, the Hurricanes re-signed Carrick to a one-year contract extension. He appeared in one game with Carolina, spending the rest of the 2018–19 season with the Checkers, scoring nine goals and 47 points in 71 games. He represented Charlotte at the 2019 AHL All-Star Classic. In his final year with the Checkers he won the Calder Cup as champions of the AHL.

On August 6, 2019, Carrick was traded by the Hurricanes to the San Jose Sharks in exchange for Kyle Wood. Immediately following the trade, Carrick signed a two-year contract extension with the Sharks. Although initially assigned to their AHL affiliate, the San Jose Barracuda, to begin the season, Carrick was recalled before the first game of the season and made his debut for the Sharks in a 3–1 loss to the Anaheim Ducks on October 5, 2019. After appearing in two more games, he was returned to the Barracuda. He appeared in 48 games in the AHL and became the first defenceman in Barracuda franchise history to score a hat trick, which he did on December 3, 2019 against the Bakersfield Condors.

Entering the pandemic-delayed 2020–21 season, Carrick was initially assigned the Barracuda. On January 27, 2021, Carrick was traded by the Sharks in a three-way trade to the Anaheim Ducks in exchange for Jack Kopacka. Carrick joined brother Sam, following his reassignment to AHL affiliate, the San Diego Gulls. He had one goal and 12 points with the Gulls. He signed a one-year, two-way extension with the Ducks on July 13, 2021. In his second season with the Gulls, Carrick appeared in 61 games, scoring 10 goals and 30 points, good for second among the team's defencemen.

As an unrestricted free agent from the Ducks, Carrick was signed to a one-year, two-way contract for the 2022–23 season with the Tampa Bay Lightning on July 25, 2022. Carrick played the entirety of his contract with the Lightning on assignment to AHL affiliate, the Syracuse Crunch. He was named an alternate captain and posted a career-high 15 goals and tallied 46 points through 60 regular season games.

On July 1, 2023, Carrick returned to the Anaheim Ducks organization as a free agent from the Lightning, securing a one-year, two-way contract through the 2023–24 season. He was assigned to San Diego to start the season and remained with the club for the duration of the campaign, leading the club on the blueline in scoring with 9 goals and 44 points through 72 regular season games.

As a free agent from the Ducks, Carrick returned to the Charlotte Checkers of the AHL, signing a two-year contract on July 2, 2024. In the 2024–25 season with the Checkers, he reached the 50-point mark for the first time in his career, and in recognition of his performance was named to the Second All-Star team for the first time.

Following his 12th North American professional season, Carrick as a free agent opted to sign his first contract abroad, agreeing to a one-year deal with German club, EHC München of the DEL, on June 17, 2026.

== Personal life ==
Carrick is the son to John F. and Jane Carrick. John played junior C hockey with the Stouffville 70s. He is the third of four brothers who are all ice hockey players: brothers Jake (born 1990), Sam (born 1992) and Josh Carrick (born 1995), have all played major junior ice hockey in the OHL. Sam is also currently playing within the Edmonton Oilers organization, who acquired him from the Anaheim Ducks organization in March 2024. Carrick is also a cousin to Bobby Hughes, who most recently played for the Brampton Beast of the ECHL in 2014–15.

== Career statistics ==
			Regular season					Playoffs
Season	Team	League	GP	G	A	Pts	PIM	GP	G	A	Pts	PIM
2009–10	Upper Canada Patriots	CCHL	3	0	1	1	2	—	—	—	—	—
2010–11	Stouffville Spirit	OJHL	40	6	13	19	44	19	2	11	13	10
2011–12	Mississauga St. Michael's Majors	OHL	68	6	13	19	64	6	1	0	1	7
2012–13	Mississauga Steelheads	OHL	56	10	21	31	56	6	0	2	2	11
2013–14	Mississauga Steelheads	OHL	41	16	15	31	65	—	—	—	—	—
2013–14	Sudbury Wolves	OHL	29	6	14	20	52	5	1	2	3	10
2014–15	Charlotte Checkers	AHL	76	7	25	32	94	—	—	—	—	—
2015–16	Charlotte Checkers	AHL	70	9	33	42	51	—	—	—	—	—
2015–16	Carolina Hurricanes	NHL	2	0	0	0	0	—	—	—	—	—
2016–17	Charlotte Checkers	AHL	57	4	12	16	45	5	0	3	3	0
2017–18	Charlotte Checkers	AHL	73	11	33	44	85	8	0	4	4	6
2017–18	Carolina Hurricanes	NHL	1	0	0	0	2	—	—	—	—	—
2018–19	Charlotte Checkers	AHL	71	9	38	47	86	16	3	9	12	50
2018–19	Carolina Hurricanes	NHL	1	0	0	0	5	—	—	—	—	—
2019–20	San Jose Barracuda	AHL	48	10	13	23	55	—	—	—	—	—
2019–20	San Jose Sharks	NHL	3	0	0	0	5	—	—	—	—	—
2020–21	San Diego Gulls	AHL	39	1	11	12	53	3	1	0	1	0
2021–22	San Diego Gulls	AHL	61	10	20	30	45	2	1	0	1	8
2022–23	Syracuse Crunch	AHL	60	15	31	46	45	5	1	3	4	16
2023–24	San Diego Gulls	AHL	72	9	35	44	64	—	—	—	—	—
2024–25	Charlotte Checkers	AHL	67	13	37	50	52	18	1	4	5	20
2025–26	Charlotte Checkers	AHL	59	5	18	23	69	3	1	0	1	2
NHL totals			7	0	0	0	12	—	—	—	—	—

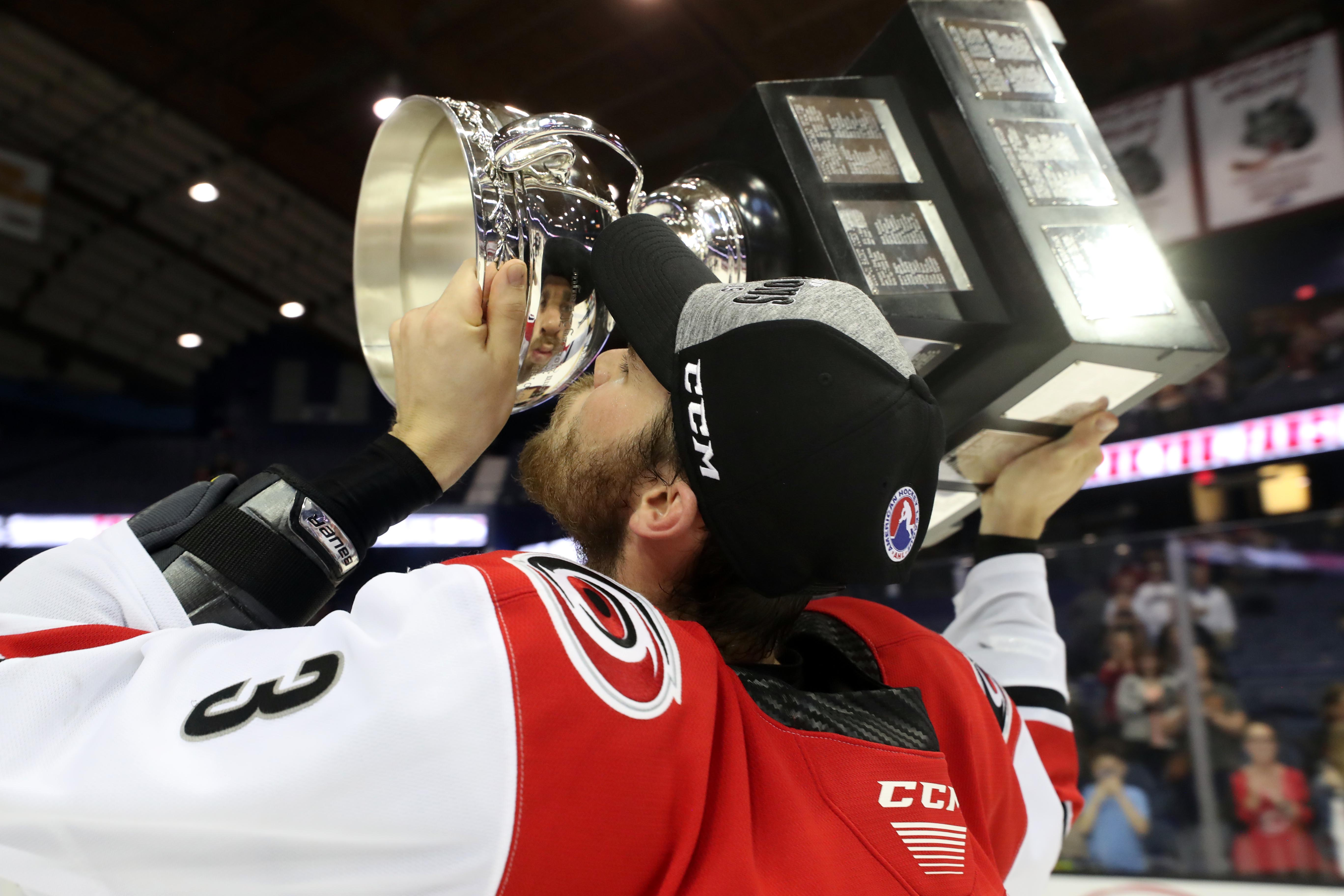
Carrick with the Calder Cup.

== Awards and honours ==
Award	Year	Ref
OHL
Second All-Rookie Team	2012	
AHL
All-Star Game	2016, 2019	
Calder Cup champion	2019	
Second All-Star Team	2025	
