= 2019 Calder Cup playoffs =

North American ice hockey tournament

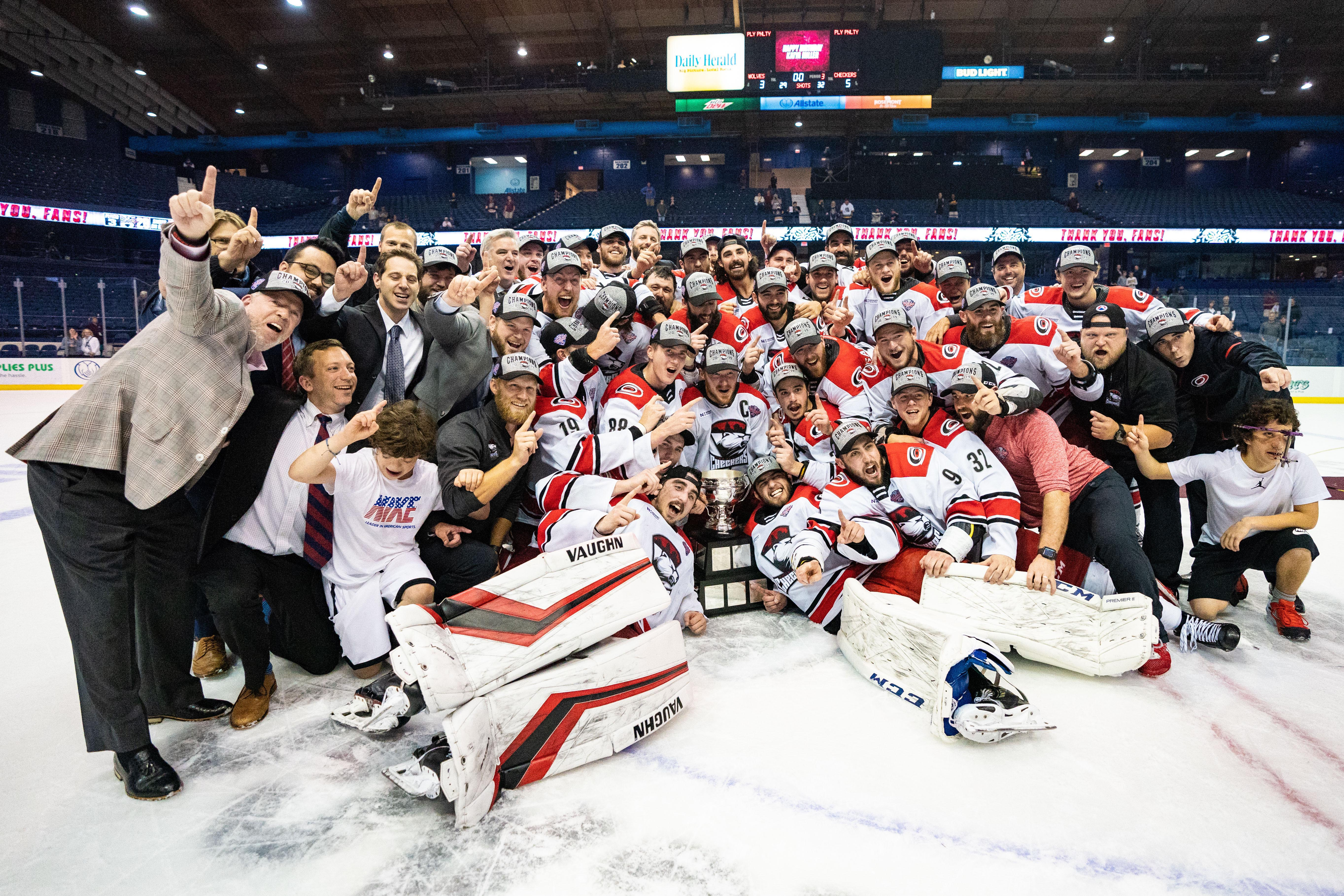
- The champion Charlotte Checkers

Tournament details
- Dates: April 17 – June 8, 2019
- Teams: 16

Final positions
- Champions: Charlotte Checkers
- Runners-up: Chicago Wolves

Tournament statistics
- Scoring leader(s): Andrew Poturalski (Checkers) (23 points)

Awards
- MVP: Andrew Poturalski (Checkers)

The 2019 Calder Cup playoffs of the American Hockey League began on April 17, 2019, with the playoff format that was introduced in 2016. The sixteen teams that qualified, four from each division, play a best-of-five series in the division semifinals, with the playoffs continuing with best-of-seven series for the division finals, conference finals, and Calder Cup finals.

The playoffs ended with the Charlotte Checkers winning their first Calder Cup in franchise history, defeating the Chicago Wolves in five games in the Calder Cup Finals.

== Playoff seeds ==
After the 2018–19 AHL regular season, 16 teams qualify for the playoffs. The top four teams in each division ranked by points qualify for the 2019 Calder Cup playoffs. The Charlotte Checkers were the first team to clinch a playoff spot on March 22 and won the regular season title with three games remaining.

=== Eastern Conference ===
==== Atlantic Division ====
1. Charlotte Checkers – 110 points (.724)
2. Bridgeport Sound Tigers – 95 points (.625)
3. Hershey Bears – 94 points (.618)
4. Providence Bruins – 87 points (.572)

==== North Division ====
1. Syracuse Crunch – 102 points (.671)
2. Rochester Americans – 99 points (.651)
3. Toronto Marlies – 91 points (.599)
4. Cleveland Monsters – 84 points (.553)

=== Western Conference ===
==== Central Division ====
1. Chicago Wolves – 98 points (.645)
2. Milwaukee Admirals – 88 points (.579)
3. Iowa Wild – 87 points (.572), 33 ROWs
4. Grand Rapids Griffins – 87 points (.572), 32 ROWs

==== Pacific Division ====
1. Bakersfield Condors – 89 points (.654)
2. San Jose Barracuda – 85 points (.625)
3. San Diego Gulls – 80 points (.588)
4. Colorado Eagles – 77 points (.566)

== Bracket ==
Division semifinals	Division finals
A1	Charlotte	3
A4	Providence	1
A1	Charlotte	4
A3	Hershey	0
A2	Bridgeport	2
A3	Hershey	3
Eastern Conference
N1	Syracuse	1
N4	Cleveland	3
N4	Cleveland	0
N3	Toronto	4
N2	Rochester	0
N3	Toronto	3
C1	Chicago	3
C4	Grand Rapids	2
C1	Chicago	4
C3	Iowa	2
C2	Milwaukee	2
C3	Iowa	3
Western Conference
P1	Bakersfield	3
P4	Colorado	1
P1	Bakersfield	2
P3	San Diego	4
P2	San Jose	1
P3	San Diego	3

Conference finals
A1	Charlotte	4
N3	Toronto	2
C1	Chicago	4
P3	San Diego	2

Calder Cup final
A1	Charlotte	4
C1	Chicago	1

== Division semifinals ==
=== Eastern Conference ===
==== (A1) Charlotte Checkers vs. (A4) Providence Bruins ====
April 20	Charlotte Checkers	5–4	Providence Bruins	Dunkin' Donuts Center	Recap
Morgan Geekie (1) – 1:26; Morgan Geekie (2) – 3:49		First period	6:45 – Jordan Szwarz (1); 9:31 – pp – Cooper Zech (1); 10:11 – Anton Blidh (1)
Tomas Jurco (1) – pp – 6:53; Julien Gauthier (1) – 16:34		Second period	No scoring
Bobby Sanguinetti (1) – 7:06		Third period	6:44 – Paul Carey (1)
Alex Nedeljkovic (23 saves / 27 shots)		Goalie stats	Zane McIntyre (22 saves / 27 shots)

April 21	Charlotte Checkers	2–4	Providence Bruins	Dunkin' Donuts Center	Recap
No scoring		First period	2:04 – pp – Cooper Zech (2); 18:42 – Jack Studnicka (1)
Andrew Poturalski (1) – pp – 17:46; Dan Renouf (1) – 19:05		Second period	No scoring
No scoring		Third period	9:41 – Peter Cehlarik (1); 19:59 – en – Chris Breen (1)
Alex Nedeljkovic (28 saves / 31 shots)		Goalie stats	Daniel Vladar (25 saves / 27 shots)

April 24	Providence Bruins	0–3	Charlotte Checkers	Bojangles' Coliseum	Recap
No scoring		First period	10:05 – Andrew Poturalski (2); 13:54 – Morgan Geekie (3)
No scoring		Second period	No scoring
No scoring		Third period	1:04 – Andrew Poturalski (3)
Zane McIntyre (25 saves / 28 shots)		Goalie stats	Alex Nedeljkovic (20 saves / 20 shots)

April 26	Providence Bruins	1–4	Charlotte Checkers	Bojangles' Coliseum	Recap
No scoring		First period	17:32 – Jacob Pritchard (1)
No scoring		Second period	7:01 – Morgan Geekie (4); 11:04 – Andrew Poturalski (4)
Jeremy Lauzon (1) – 2:36		Third period	19:30 – en – Andrew Poturalski (5)
Kyle Keyser (26 saves / 29 shots)		Goalie stats	Alex Nedeljkovic (25 saves / 26 shots)

Charlotte won series 3–1

==== (A2) Bridgeport Sound Tigers vs. (A3) Hershey Bears ====
April 19	Hershey Bears	2–3	2OT	Bridgeport Sound Tigers	Webster Bank Arena	Recap
No scoring		First period		No scoring
Chris McCarthy (1) – 8:16; Jayson Megna (1) – sh – 13:02		Second period		14:21 – pp – Kieffer Bellows (1)
No scoring		Third period		17:52 – pp – Steve Bernier (1)
No scoring		Second overtime period		13:36 – pp – Kieffer Bellows (2)
Ilya Samsonov (49 saves / 52 shots)		Goalie stats		Christopher Gibson (29 saves / 31 shots)

April 20	Hershey Bears	2–0	Bridgeport Sound Tigers	Webster Bank Arena	Recap
Michael Sgarbossa (1) – 11:15		First period	No scoring
Riley Barber (1) – 4:07		Second period	No scoring
No scoring		Third period	No scoring
Vitek Vanecek (39 saves / 39 shots)		Goalie stats	Jeremy Smith (32 saves / 34 shots)

April 23	Bridgeport Sound Tigers	1–2	Hershey Bears	Giant Center	Recap
Josh Ho-Sang (1) – 17:38		First period	11:22 – Liam O'Brien (1)
No scoring		Second period	No scoring
No scoring		Third period	2:50 – Ryan Sproul (1)
Christopher Gibson (32 saves / 34 shots)		Goalie stats	Ilya Samsonov (26 saves / 27 shots)

April 25	Bridgeport Sound Tigers	3–2	OT	Hershey Bears	Giant Center	Recap
No scoring		First period		5:47 – Ryan Sproul (2)
Stephen Gionta (1) – 2:18		Second period		15:22 – sh – Jayson Megna (2)
Oliver Wahlstrom (1) – 1:56		Third period		No scoring
Matt Lorito (1) – 1:13		First overtime period		No scoring
Christopher Gibson (22 saves / 24 shots)		Goalie stats		Vitek Vanecek (37 saves / 40 shots)

April 27	Hershey Bears	3–2	OT	Bridgeport Sound Tigers	Webster Bank Arena	Recap
No scoring		First period		7:30 – Matt Lorito (2)
Steven Whitney (1) – 6:43; Riley Barber (2) – pp – 15:43		Second period		12:07 – Oliver Wahlstrom (2)
No scoring		Third period		No scoring
Brian Pinho (1) – 10:27		First overtime period		No scoring
Ilya Samsonov (29 saves / 31 shots)		Goalie stats		Christopher Gibson (31 saves / 34 shots)

Hershey won series 3–2

==== (N1) Syracuse Crunch vs. (N4) Cleveland Monsters ====
April 19	Cleveland Monsters	5–3	Syracuse Crunch	Oncenter War Memorial Arena	Recap
No scoring		First period	No scoring
Mark Letestu (1) – 10:15; Ryan MacInnis (1) – 12:26		Second period	17:55 – pp – Alexander Volkov (1)
Kevin Stenlund (1) – pp – 13:09; Zac Dalpe (1) – 14:01; Dillon Simpson (1) – en – 19:23		Third period	10:49 – pp – Cory Conacher (1); 18:08 – Carter Verhaeghe (1)
Brad Thiessen (16 saves / 19 shots)		Goalie stats	Edward Pasquale (23 saves / 27 shots)

April 20	Cleveland Monsters	5–1	Syracuse Crunch	Oncenter War Memorial Arena	Recap
No scoring		First period	No scoring
Justin Scott (1) – 0:18; Dan DeSalvo (1) – 17:15		Second period	12:36 – pp – Ross Colton (1)
Mark Letestu (2) – 9:05; Sonny Milano (1) – en – 15:47; Derek Barach (1) – en – 17:40		Third period	No scoring
Brad Thiessen (18 saves / 19 shots)		Goalie stats	Edward Pasquale (27 saves / 30 shots)

April 23	Syracuse Crunch	2–1	Cleveland Monsters	Rocket Mortgage FieldHouse	Recap
Alex Barre-Boulet (1) – 12:10		First period	No scoring
No scoring		Second period	No scoring
Andy Andreoff (1) – pp – 0:31		Third period	12:47 – sh – Justin Scott (2)
Edward Pasquale (25 saves / 26 shots)		Goalie stats	Brad Thiessen (25 saves / 27 shots)

April 25	Syracuse Crunch	0–3	Cleveland Monsters	Rocket Mortgage FieldHouse	Recap
No scoring		First period	6:36 – Liam Foudy (1)
No scoring		Second period	4:31 – Alex Broadhurst (1); 18:02 – Liam Foudy (2)
No scoring		Third period	No scoring
Edward Pasquale (22 saves / 25 shots)		Goalie stats	Brad Thiessen (38 saves / 38 shots)

Cleveland won series 3–1

==== (N2) Rochester Americans vs. (N3) Toronto Marlies ====
April 19	Toronto Marlies	4–1	Rochester Americans	Blue Cross Arena	Recap
No scoring		First period	No scoring
Nicholas Baptiste (1) – 2:53; Chris Mueller (1) – 14:31		Second period	No scoring
Chris Mueller (2) – pp – 10:50; Adam Brooks (1) – sh – 14:45		Third period	18:52 – Tage Thompson (1)
Kasimir Kaskisuo (29 saves / 30 shots)		Goalie stats	Scott Wedgewood (19 saves / 23 shots)

April 21	Toronto Marlies	3–2	OT	Rochester Americans	Blue Cross Arena	Recap
No scoring		First period		No scoring
No scoring		Second period		4:05 – C. J. Smith (1); 18:36 – Kevin Porter (1)
Chris Mueller (3) – pp – 0:59; Jeremy Bracco (1) – 1:54		Third period		No scoring
Jeremy Bracco (2) – 2:20		First overtime period		No scoring
Kasimir Kaskisuo (40 saves / 42 shots)		Goalie stats		Scott Wedgewood (20 saves / 23 shots)

April 24	Rochester Americans	1–3	Toronto Marlies	Coca-Cola Coliseum	Recap
No scoring		First period	1:26 – Adam Brooks (2)
Tage Thompson (2) – pp – 9:38		Second period	11:37 – Adam Brooks (3)
No scoring		Third period	19:24 – en – Adam Brooks (4)
Scott Wedgewood (17 saves / 19 shots)		Goalie stats	Kasimir Kaskisuo (28 saves / 29 shots)

Toronto won series 3–0

=== Western Conference ===
==== (C1) Chicago Wolves vs. (C4) Grand Rapids Griffins ====
April 19	Grand Rapids Griffins	5–1	Chicago Wolves	Allstate Arena	Recap
Colin Campbell (1) – 19:18		First period	8:28 – Tye McGinn (1)
Matt Puempel (1) – pp – 10:01		Second period	No scoring
Dominic Turgeon (1) – 13:10; Turner Elson (1) – 17:06; Dominik Shine (1) – 17:39		Third period	No scoring
Harri Sateri (29 saves / 30 shots)		Goalie stats	Oscar Dansk (26 saves / 30 shots)

April 20	Grand Rapids Griffins	2–3	Chicago Wolves	Allstate Arena	Recap
No scoring		First period	No scoring
Colin Campbell (2) – 8:18		Second period	7:38 – Tomas Hyka (1); 12:58 – pp – Zach Whitecloud (1); 13:42 – Keegan Kolesar (1)
Chris Terry (1) – 15:30		Third period	No scoring
Harri Sateri (24 saves / 27 shots)		Goalie stats	Maxime Lagace (26 saves / 28 shots)

April 23	Chicago Wolves	2–6	Grand Rapids Griffins	Van Andel Arena	Recap
T. J. Tynan (1) – pp – 12:31		First period	19:28 – Filip Zadina (1)
Tye McGinn (2) – 5:56		Second period	2:24 – Martin Frk (1); 9:16 – Wade Megan (1); 12:23 – pp – Wade Megan (2); 16:55 – Filip Zadina (2)
No scoring		Third period	15:02 – pp – Matt Puempel (2)
Maxime Lagace (19 saves / 25 shots)		Goalie stats	Harri Sateri (35 saves / 37 shots)

April 24	Chicago Wolves	5–2	Grand Rapids Griffins	Van Andel Arena	Recap
No scoring		First period	No scoring
Nicolas Hague (1) – pp – 9:19; T. J. Tynan (2) – pp – 12:44		Second period	7:02 – Derek Hulak (1)
Cody Glass (1) – 1:03; Tye McGinn (3) – en – 18:41; Keegan Kolesar (2) – en – 19:49		Third period	2:08 – Turner Elson (2)
Oscar Dansk (29 saves / 31 shots)		Goalie stats	Harri Sateri (29 saves / 32 shots)

April 28	Grand Rapids Griffins	2–4	Chicago Wolves	Allstate Arena	Recap
Vili Saarijarvi (1) – 7:22		First period	No scoring
No scoring		Second period	3:41 – Cody Glass (2); 5:31 – pp – Tomas Hyka (2); 13:08 – Keegan Kolesar (3)
Colin Campbell (3) – 19:26		Third period	3:06 – Keegan Kolesar (4)
Harri Sateri (16 saves / 20 shots)		Goalie stats	Oscar Dansk (30 saves / 32 shots)

Chicago won series 3–2

==== (C2) Milwaukee Admirals vs. (C3) Iowa Wild ====
April 21	Milwaukee Admirals	0–7	Iowa Wild	Wells Fargo Arena	Recap
No scoring		First period	12:19 – Cal O'Reilly (1)
No scoring		Second period	4:32 – Gerald Mayhew (1); 8:30 – Sam Anas (1); 11:24 – Kyle Rau (1)
No scoring		Third period	10:19 – Kyle Rau (2); 11:32 – Luke Kunin (1); 18:26 – pp – Colton Beck (1)
Troy Grosenick (22 saves / 26 shots); Tom McCollum (13 saves / 16 shots)		Goalie stats	Andrew Hammond (29 saves / 29 shots)

April 23	Milwaukee Admirals	1–6	Iowa Wild	Wells Fargo Arena	Recap
Justin Kirkland (1) – 18:40		First period	17:29 – Luke Kunin (2)
No scoring		Second period	19:50 – pp – Matt Read (1)
No scoring		Third period	5:34 – Luke Kunin (3); 6:38 – Mason Shaw (1); 8:49 – Gerald Mayhew (2); 19:24 – Mike Liambas (1)
Troy Grosenick (25 saves / 31 shots)		Goalie stats	Andrew Hammond (33 saves / 34 shots)

April 25	Iowa Wild	1–3	Milwaukee Admirals	UW–Milwaukee Panther Arena	Recap
No scoring		First period	0:30 – Colin Blackwell (1)
No scoring		Second period	8:43 – Mathieu Olivier (1)
Kyle Rau (3) – pp – 13:23		Third period	14:32 – Anthony Richard (1)
Andrew Hammond (20 saves / 23 shots)		Goalie stats	Troy Grosenick (21 saves / 22 shots)

April 26	Iowa Wild	4–5	OT	Milwaukee Admirals	UW–Milwaukee Panther Arena	Recap
Matt Read (2) – pp – 18:43		First period		6:59 – Phillip Di Giuseppe (1); 18:14 – sh – Anthony Richard (2)
Gerald Mayhew (3) – 4:15		Second period		No scoring
Cal O'Reilly (2) – pp – 5:23; Gerald Mayhew (4) – sh – 11:55		Third period		3:11 – Anthony Richard (3); 6:54 – Phillip Di Giuseppe (2)
No scoring		First overtime period		12:33 – Frederic Allard (1)
Andrew Hammond (25 saves / 30 shots)		Goalie stats		Troy Grosenick (28 saves / 32 shots)

April 29	Iowa Wild	2–1	Milwaukee Admirals	UW–Milwaukee Panther Arena	Recap
Cal O'Reilly (3) – pp – 4:19		First period	No scoring
No scoring		Second period	11:35 – pp – Anthony Richard (4)
Louie Belpedio (1) – 9:24		Third period	No scoring
Andrew Hammond (26 saves / 27 shots)		Goalie stats	Troy Grosenick (22 saves / 24 shots)

Iowa won series 3–2

==== (P1) Bakersfield Condors vs. (P4) Colorado Eagles ====
April 19	Bakersfield Condors	3–2	Colorado Eagles	Budweiser Events Center	Recap
Brad Malone (1) – 9:17		First period	No scoring
William Lagesson (1) – 6:30		Second period	0:55 – Mark Alt (1)
Logan Day (1) – 6:33		Third period	5:48 – David Warsofsky (1)
Shane Starrett (26 saves / 28 shots)		Goalie stats	Pavel Francouz (19 saves / 22 shots)

April 20	Bakersfield Condors	1–4	Colorado Eagles	Budweiser Events Center	Recap
No scoring		First period	2:22 – Julien Nantel (1)
No scoring		Second period	9:30 – sh – Andrew Agozzino (1)
Ethan Bear (1) – 1:34		Third period	12:29 – pp – Andrew Agozzino (2); 19:50 – en – Andrew Agozzino (3)
Shane Starrett (18 saves / 21 shots)		Goalie stats	Pavel Francouz (29 saves / 30 shots)

April 23	Colorado Eagles	2–5	Bakersfield Condors	Rabobank Arena	Recap
No scoring		First period	10:20 – pp – Ryan Stanton (1)
Anton Lindholm (1) – 7:30; Sheldon Dries (1) – 19:46		Second period	5:34 – Joe Gambardella (1); 7:14 – Evan Polei (1); 10:30 – Evan Bouchard (1); 17:42 – Evan Polei (2)
No scoring		Third period	No scoring
Pavel Francouz (36 saves / 41 shots)		Goalie stats	Shane Starrett (16 saves / 18 shots)

April 27	Colorado Eagles	2–5	Bakersfield Condors	Rabobank Arena	Recap
No scoring		First period	No scoring
Martin Kaut (1) – 8:16; Martin Kaut (2) – pp – 19:59		Second period	4:03 – Mitch Callahan (1)
No scoring		Third period	2:23 – pp – Evan Bouchard (2); 9:05 – sh – Patrick Russell (1); 10:54 – Brad Malone (2); 19:07 – en – Luke Esposito (1)
Pavel Francouz (26 saves / 30 shots)		Goalie stats	Shane Starrett 24 saves / 26 shots)

Bakersfield won series 3–1

==== (P2) San Jose Barracuda vs. (P3) San Diego Gulls ====
April 17	San Jose Barracuda	5–6	OT	San Diego Gulls	Pechanga Arena	Recap
T. J. Hensick (1) – 3:17; Jeffrey Truchon-Viel (1) – 5:27; Dylan Gambrell (1) – 6:15		First period		7:10 – Jacob Larsson (1); 7:47 – Sam Carrick (1); 10:18 – Kiefer Sherwood (1)
Ivan Chekhovich (1) – 4:47; John McCarthy (1) – 10:34		Second period		14:47 – Corey Tropp (1); 16:35 – Chase De Leo (1)
No scoring		Third period		No scoring
No scoring		First overtime period		1:13 – Kiefer Sherwood (2)
Antoine Bibeau (5 saves / 8 shots); Josef Korenar (31 saves / 34 shots)		Goalie stats		Kevin Boyle (3 saves / 6 shots); Jeff Glass (27 saves / 29 shots)

April 18	San Jose Barracuda	5–3	San Diego Gulls	Pechanga Arena	Recap
Evan Weinger (1) – 12:19		First period	No scoring
Ivan Chekhovich (2) – pp – 5:44; Jon Martin (1) – 9:27		Second period	6:15 – sh – Chase De Leo (2)
Jayden Halbgewachs (1) – en – 18:03; Evan Weinger (2) – en – 19:38		Third period	15:46 – Justin Kloos (1); 19:33 – Sam Steel (1)
Josef Korenar (27 saves / 30 shots)		Goalie stats	Jeff Glass (22 saves / 25 shots)

April 22	San Diego Gulls	4–2	San Jose Barracuda	SAP Center	Recap
Sam Steel (2) – 19:21		First period	2:48 – Jon Martin (2)
Ben Street (1) – pp – 3:41; Chase De Leo (3) – 16:47		Second period	18:44 – pp – Jon Martin (3)
Adam Cracknell (1) – en – 19:02		Third period	No scoring
Jeff Glass (20 saves / 22 shots)		Goalie stats	Josef Korenar (32 saves / 35 shots)

April 24	San Diego Gulls	5–2	San Jose Barracuda	SAP Center	Recap
Sam Carrick (2) – 15:46		First period	0:50 – Alexander True (1)
Andy Welinski (1) – pp – 3:43; Sam Steel (3) – 6:43		Second period	13:39 – pp – Nick DeSimone (1)
Adam Cracknell (2) – 5:12; Chase De Leo (4) – en – 18:07		Third period	No scoring
Jeff Glass (30 saves / 32 shots)		Goalie stats	Josef Korenar (25 saves / 29 shots)

San Diego won series 3–1

== Division finals ==
=== Eastern Conference ===
==== (A1) Charlotte Checkers vs. (A3) Hershey Bears ====
May 3	Hershey Bears	1–4	Charlotte Checkers	Bojangles' Coliseum	Recap
Chris McCarthy (2) – 15:38		First period	1:42 – Julien Gauthier (2); 3:56 – Derek Sheppard (1); 10:27 – Aleksi Saarela (1); 11:32 – Stelio Mattheos (1)
No scoring		Second period	No scoring
No scoring		Third period	No scoring
Vitek Vanecek (34 saves / 38 shots)		Goalie stats	Dustin Tokarski (25 saves / 26 shots)

May 4	Hershey Bears	3–7	Charlotte Checkers	Bojangles' Coliseum	Recap
Jayson Megna (3) – pp – 17:05		First period	4:43 – Zach Nastasiuk (1)
Ryan Sproul (3) – 15:51		Second period	5:34 – pp – Martin Necas (1); 9:25 – Morgan Geekie (5)
Riley Barber (3) – 16:32		Third period	3:24 – Tomas Jurco (2); 6:57 – Julien Gauthier (3); 14:22 – Tomas Jurco (3); 17:58 – pp – Martin Necas (2)
Ilya Samsonov (26 saves / 33 shots)		Goalie stats	Alex Nedeljkovic (24 saves / 27 shots)

May 7	Charlotte Checkers	3–1	Hershey Bears	Giant Center	Recap
No scoring		First period	18:56 – Nathan Walker (1)
Aleksi Saarela (2) – 6:32		Second period	No scoring
Stelio Mattheos (2) – 17:52; Aleksi Saarela (3) – en – 19:03		Third period	No scoring
Alex Nedeljkovic (17 saves / 18 shots)		Goalie stats	Vitek Vanecek (20 saves / 22 shots)

May 8	Charlotte Checkers	5–2	Hershey Bears	Giant Center	Recap
Aleksi Saarela (4) – 14:25		First period	No scoring
Julien Gauthier (4) – pp – 0:57; Aleksi Saarela (5) – 14:22		Second period	No scoring
Tomas Jurco (4) – pp – 3:01; Aleksi Saarela (6) – en – 18:23		Third period	5:37 – pp – Jayson Megna (4); 14:44 – Shane Gersich (1)
Alex Nedeljkovic (16 saves / 18 shots)		Goalie stats	Ilya Samsonov (18 saves / 22 shots)

Charlotte won series 4–0

==== (N3) Toronto Marlies vs. (N4) Cleveland Monsters ====
May 1	Cleveland Monsters	2–5	Toronto Marlies	Coca-Cola Coliseum	Recap
Tommy Cross (1) – pp – 12:39		First period	No scoring
Mark Letestu (3) – 5:37		Second period	2:15 – Pierre Engvall (1); 11:59 – pp – Chris Mueller (4); 14:13 – pp – Dmytro Timashov (1); 15:42 – pp – Trevor Moore (1)
No scoring		Third period	19:44 – pp, en – Trevor Moore (2)
Brad Thiessen (21 saves / 25 shots)		Goalie stats	Kasimir Kaskisuo (14 saves / 16 shots)

May 3	Cleveland Monsters	3–4	OT	Toronto Marlies	Coca-Cola Coliseum	Recap
Sonny Milano (2) – 17:58		First period		7:42 – pp – Chris Mueller (5); 9:30 – Joseph Duszak (1)
Dan DeSalvo (2) – 3:15		Second period		18:23 – Yegor Korshkov (1)
Ryan Collins (1) – 0:40		Third period		No scoring
No scoring		First overtime period		1:13 – Michael Carcone (1)
Brad Thiessen (22 saves / 26 shots)		Goalie stats		Kasimir Kaskisuo (35 saves / 38 shots)

May 5	Toronto Marlies	2–0	Cleveland Monsters	Rocket Mortgage FieldHouse	Recap
Adam Brooks (5) – 13:24		First period	No scoring
No scoring		Second period	No scoring
Dmytro Timashov (2) – en – 19:29		Third period	No scoring
Kasimir Kaskisuo (35 saves / 35 shots)		Goalie stats	Brad Thiessen (24 saves / 25 shots)

May 7	Toronto Marlies	6–2	Cleveland Monsters	Rocket Mortgage FieldHouse	Recap
No scoring		First period	2:54 – Trey Fix-Wolansky (1); 6:58 – pp – Zac Dalpe (2)
Mason Marchment (1) – 1:00; Mason Marchment (2) – pp – 3:47; Trevor Moore (3) – 7:12; Trevor Moore (4) – pp – 9:56		Second period	No scoring
Michael Carcone (2) – 4:56; Michael Carcone (3) – en – 19:23		Third period	No scoring
Kasimir Kaskisuo (23 saves / 25 shots)		Goalie stats	Brad Thiessen (21 saves / 26 shots)

Toronto won series 4–0

=== Western Conference ===
==== (C1) Chicago Wolves vs. (C3) Iowa Wild ====
May 1	Iowa Wild	2–3	OT	Chicago Wolves	Allstate Arena	Recap
Gerald Mayhew (5) – 18:50		First period		14:24 – Brooks Macek (1)
Gerald Mayhew (6) – 16:32		Second period		No scoring
No scoring		Third period		6:28 – Nicolas Hague (2)
No scoring		First overtime period		18:39 – Cody Glass (3)
Andrew Hammond (26 saves / 29 shots)		Goalie stats		Oscar Dansk (26 saves / 28 shots)

May 2	Iowa Wild	3–4	Chicago Wolves	Allstate Arena	Recap
Gerald Mayhew (7) – pp – 10:15; Luke Kunin (4) – 17:50		First period	1:29 – Brooks Macek (2); 4:42 – Matthew Weis (1); 18:28 – Zach Whitecloud (2)
Luke Kunin (5) – 19:02		Second period	6:07 – Tobias Lindberg (1)
No scoring		Third period	No scoring
Andrew Hammond (26 saves / 30 shots)		Goalie stats	Oscar Dansk (22 saves / 25 shots)

May 5	Chicago Wolves	0–2	Iowa Wild	Wells Fargo Arena	Recap
No scoring		First period	17:05 – Luke Kunin (6)
No scoring		Second period	No scoring
No scoring		Third period	19:05 – en – Matt Read (3)
Oscar Dansk (18 saves / 19 shots)		Goalie stats	Andrew Hammond (26 saves / 26 shots)

May 8	Chicago Wolves	1–2	Iowa Wild	Wells Fargo Arena	Recap
No scoring		First period	13:01 – Gerald Mayhew (8)
No scoring		Second period	No scoring
Curtis McKenzie (1) – 9:11		Third period	5:25 – Gerald Mayhew (9)
Oscar Dansk (20 saves / 22 shots)		Goalie stats	Andrew Hammond (33 saves / 34 shots)

May 10	Chicago Wolves	7–4	Iowa Wild	Wells Fargo Arena	Recap
Matthew Weis (2) – 3:09; Stefan Matteau (1) – sh – 18:15		First period	15:02 – Ryan Donato (1)
Daniel Carr (1) – pp – 4:24; Curtis McKenzie (2) – 5:10; Curtis McKenzie (3) – pp – 19:03		Second period	16:05 – pp – Kyle Rau (4)
Gage Quinney (1) – 10:14; Curtis McKenzie (4) – pp – 16:42		Third period	1:52 – Matt Bartkowski (1); 19:19 – Ryan Donato (2)
Oscar Dansk (24 saves / 28 shots)		Goalie stats	Andrew Hammond (22 saves / 29 shots)

May 13	Iowa Wild	1–3	Chicago Wolves	Allstate Arena	Recap
No scoring		First period	No scoring
Hunter Warner (1) – pp – 13:22		Second period	4:27 – pp – Curtis McKenzie (5); 17:33 – sh – Daniel Carr (2); 17:58 – Cody Glass (4)
No scoring		Third period	No scoring
Andrew Hammond (23 saves / 26 shots)		Goalie stats	Oscar Dansk (23 saves / 24 shots)

Chicago won series 4–2

==== (P1) Bakersfield Condors vs. (P3) San Diego Gulls ====
May 3	San Diego Gulls	3–2	4OT	Bakersfield Condors	Rabobank Arena	Recap
No scoring		First period		No scoring
No scoring		Second period		12:09 – sh – Brad Malone (3)
Justin Kloos (2) – pp – 0:32; Sam Carrick (3) – 4:33		Third period		4:22 – Joe Gambardella (2)
Max Comtois (1) – 4:20		Fourth overtime period		No scoring
Jeff Glass (51 saves / 53 shots)		Goalie stats		Shane Starrett (53 saves / 56 shots)

May 4	San Diego Gulls	4–1	Bakersfield Condors	Rabobank Arena	Recap
Kiefer Sherwood (3) – 18:15		First period	No scoring
Max Comtois (2) – 2:29		Second period	No scoring
Isac Lundestrom (1) – 14:45; Adam Cracknell (3) – en – 18:19		Third period	5:44 – Ethan Bear (1)
Kevin Boyle (19 saves / 20 shots); Jeff Glass (8 saves / 8 shots)		Goalie stats	Dylan Wells (35 saves / 38 shots)

May 8	Bakersfield Condors	7–6	OT	San Diego Gulls	Pechanga Arena	Recap
Joe Gambardella (3) – 5:28; Joe Gambardella (4) – 15:55		First period		15:03 – Adam Cracknell (4)
Ethan Bear (2) – 1:04; Joe Gambardella (5) – pp – 14:01		Second period		5:23 – pp – Kalle Kossila (1); 5:34 – Kiefer Sherwood (4); 8:10 – pp – Andy Welinski (2)
Brad Malone (4) – 11:00; Tyler Benson (1) – 19:49		Third period		0:34 – Corey Tropp (2); 7:11 – Sam Steel (4)
William Lagesson (2) – 0:33		First overtime period		No scoring
Shane Starrett (13 saves / 17 shots); Stuart Skinner (10 saves / 12 shots)		Goalie stats		Jeff Glass (30 saves / 37 shots)

May 10	Bakersfield Condors	2–4	San Diego Gulls	Pechanga Arena	Recap
Ryan Stanton (2) – 15:48		First period	12:10 – pp – Adam Cracknell (5)
No scoring		Second period	0:25 – Sam Carrick (4); 5:07 – Adam Cracknell (6); 19:16 – pp – Kevin Roy (1)
Keegan Lowe (1) – 8:02		Third period	No scoring
Shane Starrett (9 saves / 12 shots); Stuart Skinner (18 saves / 19 shots)		Goalie stats	Jeff Glass (26 saves / 28 shots)

May 11	San Diego Gulls	1–2	2OT	Bakersfield Condors	Rabobank Arena	Recap
No scoring		First period		9:30 – pp – Joe Gambardella (6)
Kevin Roy (2) – 10:44		Second period		No scoring
No scoring		Third period		No scoring
No scoring		Second overtime period		13:02 – Josh Currie (1)
Jeff Glass (42 saves / 44 shots)		Goalie stats		Stuart Skinner (45 saves / 46 shots)

May 13	Bakersfield Condors	2–6	San Diego Gulls	Pechanga Arena	Recap
Brad Malone (5) — pp – 5:14		First period	0:46 – Chase De Leo (5); 10:00 – Kalle Kossila (2); 17:33 – pp – Kalle Kossila (3)
Evan Bouchard (3) – 4:29		Second period	9:34 – Max Comtois (3); 13:41 – Sam Carrick (5)
No scoring		Third period	18:01 – Ben Street (2)
Stuart Skinner (5 saves / 8 shots); Shane Starrett (18 saves / 21 shots)		Goalie stats	Jeff Glass (20 saves / 22 shots)

San Diego won series 4–2

== Conference finals ==
=== Eastern Conference ===
==== (A1) Charlotte Checkers vs. (N3) Toronto Marlies ====
May 17	Toronto Marlies	2–1	Charlotte Checkers	Bojangles' Coliseum	Recap
No scoring		First period	No scoring
Dmytro Timashov (3) – pp – 5:50		Second period	12:07 – Haydn Fleury (1)
Mason Marchment (3) – 0:57		Third period	No scoring
Kasimir Kaskisuo (26 saves / 27 shots)		Goalie stats	Alex Nedeljkovic (26 saves / 28 shots)

May 18	Toronto Marlies	3–5	Charlotte Checkers	Bojangles' Coliseum	Recap
Jeremy Bracco (3) – 1:33; Colin Greening (1) – 15:43		First period	No scoring
Adam Brooks (6) – 4:52		Second period	15:34 – Tomas Jurco (5)
No scoring		Third period	7:21 – Nicolas Roy (1); 8:30 – Jesper Sellgren (1); 18:19 – Andrew Poturalski (6); 19:17 – en – Patrick Brown (1)
Kasimir Kaskisuo (20 saves / 24 shots)		Goalie stats	Alex Nedeljkovic (9 saves / 12 shots); Dustin Tokarski (9 saves / 9 shots)

May 21	Charlotte Checkers	5–1	Toronto Marlies	Coca-Cola Coliseum	Recap
Trevor Carrick (1) – 8:28; Tomas Jurco (6) – 13:54		First period	No scoring
Andrew Poturalski (7) – 18:30		Second period	No scoring
Patrick Brown (2) – 8:57; Morgan Geekie (6) – 15:23		Third period	17:50 – pp – Mason Marchment (4)
Alex Nedeljkovic (33 saves / 34 shots)		Goalie stats	Kasimir Kaskisuo (19 saves / 22 shots); Michael Hutchinson (3 saves / 5 shots)

May 23	Charlotte Checkers	3–4	OT	Toronto Marlies	Coca-Cola Coliseum	Recap
No scoring		First period		17:12 – Michael Carcone (4)
Nicolas Roy (2) – sh – 3:40		Second period		No scoring
Jesper Sellgren (2) – 1:08; Andrew Poturalski (8) – pp – 7:35		Third period		5:07 – Michael Carcone (5); 11:16 – Jeremy Bracco (4)
No scoring		First overtime period		7:29 – Michael Carcone (6)
Alex Nedeljkovic (24 saves / 28 shots)		Goalie stats		Kasimir Kaskisuo (29 saves / 32 shots)

May 24	Charlotte Checkers	4–1	Toronto Marlies	Coca-Cola Coliseum	Recap
Nicolas Roy (3) – sh – 19:01		First period	10:40 – pp – Trevor Moore (5)
Steven Lorentz (1) – 0:18; Haydn Fleury (2) – sh – 2:32		Second period	No scoring
Clark Bishop (1) – en – 18:05		Third period	No scoring
Dustin Tokarski (40 saves / 41 shots)		Goalie stats	Michael Hutchinson (20 saves / 23 shots)

May 26	Toronto Marlies	3–4	2OT	Charlotte Checkers	Bojangles' Coliseum	Recap
No scoring		First period		19:51 – Patrick Brown (3)
Dmytro Timashov (4) – pp, ps – 6:10; Andreas Borgman (1) – 11:35; Calle Rosen (1) – 16:48		Second period		5:15 – sh – Clark Bishop (2); 18:04 – pp – Patrick Brown (4)
No scoring		Third period		No scoring
No scoring		Second overtime period		1:52 – Morgan Geekie (7)
Kasimir Kaskisuo (31 saves / 35 shots)		Goalie stats		Alex Nedeljkovic (43 saves / 46 shots)

Charlotte won series 4–2

=== Western Conference ===
==== (C1) Chicago Wolves vs. (P3) San Diego Gulls ====
May 17	San Diego Gulls	4–5	OT	Chicago Wolves	Allstate Arena	Recap
Corey Tropp (3) – 19:32		First period		6:10 – Tobias Lindberg (2)
Max Comtois (4) – 18:51		Second period		10:05 – pp – Daniel Carr (3)
Andy Welinski (3) – pp – 8:18; Max Comtois (5) – 10:43		Third period		5:50 – Tye McGinn (4); 16:55 – Nicolas Hague (3)
No scoring		First overtime period		14:03 – Cody Glass (5)
Jeff Glass (23 saves / 28 shots)		Goalie stats		Oscar Dansk (40 saves / 44 shots)

May 18	San Diego Gulls	3–0	Chicago Wolves	Allstate Arena	Recap
Sam Carrick (6) – 6:56		First period	No scoring
Jack Kopacka (1) – 2:08		Second period	No scoring
Sam Steel (5) – en – 18:42		Third period	No scoring
Kevin Boyle (29 saves / 29 shots)		Goalie stats	Oscar Dansk (20 saves / 22 shots)

May 22	Chicago Wolves	2–3	San Diego Gulls	Pechanga Arena	Recap
Tye McGinn (5) – 1:35		First period	4:56 – Corey Tropp (4)
No scoring		Second period	3:34 – sh – Sam Steel (6); 11:44 – Trevor Murphy (1)
Curtis McKenzie (6) – 16:30		Third period	No scoring
Oscar Dansk (26 saves / 29 shots)		Goalie stats	Kevin Boyle (21 saves / 23 shots)

May 24	Chicago Wolves	2–1	2OT	San Diego Gulls	Pechanga Arena	Recap
No scoring		First period		No scoring
Griffin Reinhart (1) – 4:17		Second period		No scoring
No scoring		Third period		3:36 – Justin Kloos (3)
Daniel Carr (4) – 6:01		Second overtime period		No scoring
Oscar Dansk (40 saves / 41 shots)		Goalie stats		Kevin Boyle (42 saves / 44 shots)

May 25	Chicago Wolves	5–2	San Diego Gulls	Pechanga Arena	Recap
Tomas Hyka (3) – 11:24; Cody Glass (6) – 13:59		First period	4:57 – Adam Cracknell (7)
No scoring		Second period	No scoring
Daniel Carr (5) – 5:24; Maxime Lagace (1) – en – 10:49; Tye McGinn (6) – en – 17:51		Third period	3:57 – Jacob Larsson (2)
Maxime Lagace (19 saves / 21 shots)		Goalie stats	Kevin Boyle (22 saves / 25 shots)

May 27	San Diego Gulls	1–3	Chicago Wolves	Allstate Arena	Recap
No scoring		First period	No scoring
No scoring		Second period	No scoring
Sam Carrick (7) – pp – 14:51		Third period	12:28 – Curtis McKenzie (7); 12:47 – Keegan Kolesar (5); 16:55 – Curtis McKenzie (8)
Kevin Boyle (25 saves / 28 shots)		Goalie stats	Oscar Dansk (29 saves / 30 shots)

Chicago won series 4–2

== Calder Cup finals ==
=== (A1) Charlotte Checkers vs. (C1) Chicago Wolves ===
June 1	Chicago Wolves	4–3	OT	Charlotte Checkers	Bojangles' Coliseum	Recap
Stefan Matteau (2) – 5:54		First period		2:19 – pp – Trevor Carrick (2); 15:47 – Martin Necas (3); 19:03 – Andrew Poturalski (9)
Zac Leslie (1) – 11:27; Zach Whitecloud (3) – 19:54		Second period		No scoring
No scoring		Third period		No scoring
Stefan Matteau (3) – 5:30		First overtime period		No scoring
Oscar Dansk (35 saves / 38 shots)		Goalie stats		Alex Nedeljkovic (32 saves / 36 shots)

June 2	Chicago Wolves	3–5	Charlotte Checkers	Bojangles' Coliseum	Recap
Keegan Kolesar (6) – 4:43		First period	3:50 – sh – Nick Schilkey (1)
Gage Quinney (2) – 7:00; Gage Quinney (3) – pp – 11:13		Second period	5:34 – Nicolas Roy (4); 5:48 – Stelio Mattheos (3); 18:53 – Tomas Jurco (7)
No scoring		Third period	19:00 – en – Andrew Poturalski (10)
Oscar Dansk (26 saves / 30 shots)		Goalie stats	Dustin Tokarski (20 saves / 23 shots)

June 5	Charlotte Checkers	4–1	Chicago Wolves	Allstate Arena	Recap
Julien Gauthier (5) – 1:51		First period	No scoring
Jake Bean (1) – pp – 2:16; Patrick Brown (5) – sh – 11:46		Second period	No scoring
Martin Necas (4) – en – 16:55		Third period	14:49 – Brooks Macek (3)
Alex Nedeljkovic (38 saves / 39 shots)		Goalie stats	Oscar Dansk (22 saves / 25 shots)

June 6	Charlotte Checkers	5–3	Chicago Wolves	Allstate Arena	Recap
Jesper Sellgren (3) – 5:21		First period	0:45 – Nic Hague (4); 16:29 – Zac Leslie (2)
Martin Necas (5) – pp – 19:00		Second period	13:47 – Brooks Macek (4)
Nicolas Roy (5) – 0:32; Aleksi Saarela (7) – 12:52; Nicolas Roy (6) – en – 17:28		Third period	No scoring
Dustin Tokarski (22 saves / 25 shots)		Goalie stats	Oscar Dansk (18 saves / 22 shots)

June 8	Charlotte Checkers	5–3	Chicago Wolves	Allstate Arena	Recap
Andrew Poturalski (11) – 1:31		First period	No scoring
Morgan Geekie (8) – 8:25		Second period	19:35 – Brooks Macek (5)
Trevor Carrick (3) – 6:15; Andrew Poturalski (12) – en – 18:13; Zach Nastasiuk (2) – en – 19:44		Third period	16:54 – Gage Quinney (4); 19:21 – Cody Glass (7)
Alex Nedeljkovic (26 saves / 29 shots)		Goalie stats	Oscar Dansk (27 saves / 30 shots)

Charlotte won series 4–1

== Playoff statistical leaders ==
=== Leading skaters ===
These are the top ten skaters based on points. If there is a tie in points, goals take precedence over assists.

GP = Games played; G = Goals; A = Assists; Pts = Points; +/– = Plus–minus; PIM = Penalty minutes

Player	Team	GP	G	A	Pts	PIM
Andrew Poturalski	Charlotte Checkers	18	12	11	23	12
Morgan Geekie	Charlotte Checkers	19	8	10	18	6
Tomas Jurco	Charlotte Checkers	18	7	11	18	18
Adam Cracknell	San Diego Gulls	15	7	9	16	0
Jeremy Bracco	Toronto Marlies	13	4	12	16	2
Curtis McKenzie	Chicago Wolves	21	8	7	15	51
Aleksi Saarela	Charlotte Checkers	17	7	8	15	4
Cody Glass	Chicago Wolves	22	7	8	15	6
Nicolas Roy	Charlotte Checkers	19	6	9	15	14
Tomas Hyka	Chicago Wolves	22	3	12	15	6
Zach Whitecloud	Chicago Wolves	22	3	12	15	11

=== Leading goaltenders ===
This is a combined table of the top five goaltenders based on goals against average and the top five goaltenders based on save percentage with at least 240 minutes played. The table is initially sorted by goals against average, with the criterion for inclusion in bold.

GP = Games played; W = Wins; L = Losses; SA = Shots against; GA = Goals against; GAA = Goals against average; SV% = Save percentage; SO = Shutouts; TOI = Time on ice (in minutes)

Player	Team	GP	W	L	SA	GA	GAA	SV%	SO	TOI
Dustin Tokarski	Charlotte Checkers	5	5	0	124	8	**1.74**	**.935**	0	275:08
Christopher Gibson	Bridgeport Sound Tigers	4	2	2	123	9	**1.91**	**.927**	0	283:20
Kasimir Kaskisuo	Toronto Marlies	12	9	3	356	26	**2.14**	**.927**	1	729:57
Vitek Vanecek	Hershey Bears	4	1	3	139	9	**2.25**	**.935**	1	240:32
Kevin Boyle	San Diego Gulls	7	3	3	175	14	**2.25**	**.920**	1	373:52

Preceded by 2018 Calder Cup playoffs	Calder Cup playoffs 2019	Succeeded by ~~2020 Calder Cup playoffs~~ Cancelled
