= Morgan Geekie =

Canadian ice hockey player (born 1998)

- Geekie with the Boston Bruins in 2025
- Born: July 20, 1998 (age 28) Strathclair, Manitoba, Canada
- Height: 6 ft 3 in (191 cm)
- Weight: 212 lb (96 kg; 15 st 2 lb)
- Position: Centre
- Shoots: Right
- NHL team Former teams: Boston Bruins; Carolina Hurricanes; Seattle Kraken
- National team: Canada
- NHL draft: 67th overall, 2017; Carolina Hurricanes
- Playing career: 2018–present

Morgan Geekie (born July 20, 1998) is a Canadian ice hockey player who is a centre for the Boston Bruins of the National Hockey League (NHL). Geekie was selected by the Carolina Hurricanes in the third round, 67th overall, of the 2017 NHL entry draft.

Growing up in Manitoba, Geekie played minor hockey in the area before joining the Tri-City Americans of the Western Hockey League in 2013. After several seasons with the Americans, he joined the Hurricanes' American Hockey League (AHL) affiliate, the Charlotte Checkers, in 2018. After helping the Checkers win the Calder Cup in 2019, he made his NHL debut with the Hurricanes in 2020, collecting two goals and one assist while doing so. After another season with the Hurricanes and their new AHL affiliate, the Chicago Wolves, Geekie was selected by the Seattle Kraken in the 2021 NHL expansion draft. After two seasons with the Kraken, he signed with the Boston Bruins as a free agent. With the team, he expanded on his career-high numbers, achieving 39 points in his first season and 57 in his second.

Internationally, Geekie represents Team Canada, having done so at the 2022 IIHF World Championship, in which he won the silver medal.

== Playing career ==
=== Early career ===
Geekie was selected by the Tri-City Americans of the Western Hockey League (WHL) in the fifth round, 90th overall, of the 2013 WHL bantam draft. For the 2013–14 season, Geekie remained in his native Manitoba, playing minor hockey with the Yellowhead Chiefs of the Manitoba U-18 'AAA' Hockey League (MMHL). In his rookie season with the Chiefs, Geekie led the Chiefs with 25 goals and 53 points through 44 games, also placing 12th in league scoring. His performance also led him to be named to the MMHL's Second All-Star Team. On March 14, 2014, Geekie signed a contract with Americans. He subsequently joined the Americans for their final regular-season game, in which he scored the team's only goal in an eventual 6–1 loss.

Geekie played two games with the Neepawa Titans of the Manitoba Junior Hockey League and nine games with the Americans before returning to the Chiefs. Geekie recorded one goal and one assist with the Titans and two assists with the Americans. On December 29, 2014, partway through the season with the Chiefs, Geekie was named to the MMHL's First All-Star Team after he tallied 16 goals and 42 points in 26 games, placing second in the league in scoring at the time. Geekie finished the season with the Chiefs notching 27 goals and 36 assists through 44 games.

=== Major junior ===
Geekie began his first full major junior campaign with the Americans during the 2015–16 season, in which he scored 12 goals and 25 points through 66 games. Geekie improved offensively in the 2016–17 season, in which he led all Americans players in scoring, achieving 35 goals and 55 assists for 90 points through 72 games. Due to his performance, he was named to the WHL's Western Conference Second All-Star Team. He was subsequently ranked 42nd amongst North American skaters by the NHL Central Scouting Bureau, before the 2017 NHL entry draft. On June 24, 2017, he was one of two players taken by the Carolina Hurricanes in the third round, 67th overall, at the draft. Following his selection, he participated in the Hurricanes' development camp in the summer of 2017. In September, he was returned to the Americans from the camp.

During the 2017–18 season, his final junior hockey campaign, Geekie tallied 30 goals and 54 assists through 68 games in the regular season. He was named the WHL Player of the Month for March 2018 after he notched 16 goals and 13 assists in 29 games during that span. Through 14 playoff games, Geekie led the WHL with 17 goals, and he also collected 10 assists for 27 points. The Americans were eliminated from the playoffs in the third round of the playoffs by the Everett Silvertips.

=== Professional ===
==== Carolina Hurricanes ====
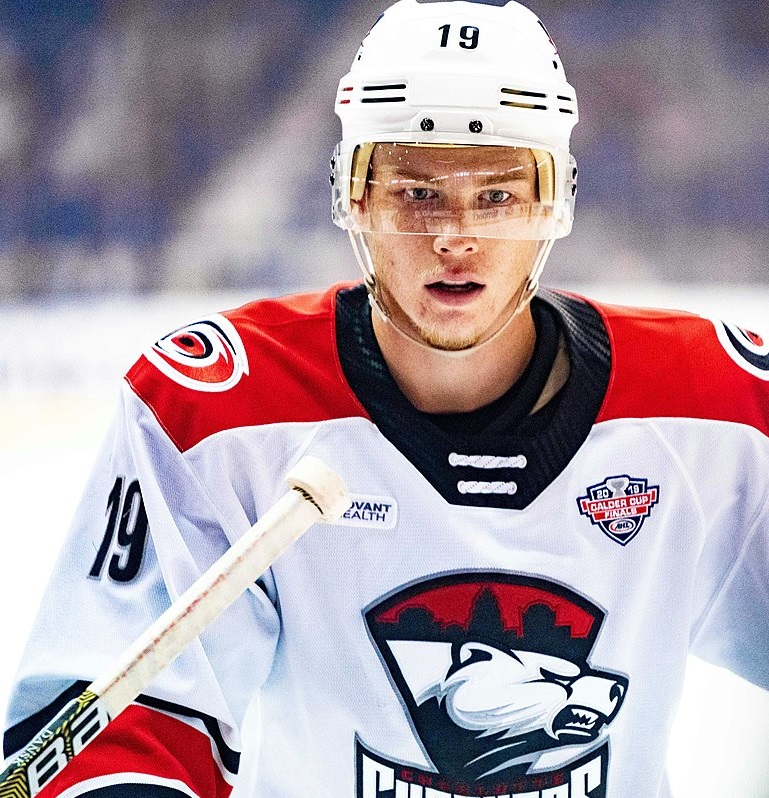
Geekie with the Checkers during the 2019 Calder Cup Final

Following the Americans' elimination from the playoffs, Geekie signed an amateur tryout offer with the Hurricanes' American Hockey League (AHL) affiliate, the Charlotte Checkers, for the remainder of their regular season on May 4, 2018. Six days later, Geekie signed a three-year, entry-level contract with the Carolina Hurricanes. After attending the Hurricanes' training camp, he was re-assigned to the Checkers for the 2018–19 season. In 73 games throughout the regular season, Geekie tallied 19 goals and 27 assists. During the 2019 Calder Cup playoffs, he set the Checkers' postseason point streak record, putting up numbers in eight straight games. In Game 6 of the Eastern Conference Final, he scored 1:52 into the second overtime, sending the Checkers to the Calder Cup Final. The Checkers defeated the Chicago Wolves in five games to clinch the Calder Cup, and Geekie totaled eight goals at 18 points through 19 playoff contests.

Geekie joined the Checkers again to start the 2019–20 season. On March 7, 2020, he was called up to the Hurricanes after he put up 20 goals and 22 assists through 55 games with the Checkers. He made his NHL debut the following day against the Pittsburgh Penguins, in which he recorded two goals and an assist in a 6–2 win. On March 10, against the Detroit Red Wings, Geekie scored his third goal on only the fourth shot of his NHL career. During the 2020 Stanley Cup playoffs, he played eight games, collected one assist.

Geekie was placed on the Hurricanes' taxi squad to begin the 2020–21 season, taxi squads being a safety measure put in place due to the COVID-19 pandemic. After playing nine games with the Hurricanes, he was sent down to the team's new AHL affiliate, the Chicago Wolves, on February 18, 2021. In only two games with the Wolves, he notched four goals and one assist, causing him to be named AHL Player of the Week. On February 22, he was recalled to the Hurricanes. On March 12, he scored two goals as part of a 5–1 victory over the Nashville Predators. Geekie finished the season with the Hurricanes achieving three goals and six assists through 36 games. During the 2021 Calder Cup playoffs, he played in three games. On July 16, 2021, he signed a one-year, entry-level contract extension to remain with the Hurricanes.

==== Seattle Kraken ====
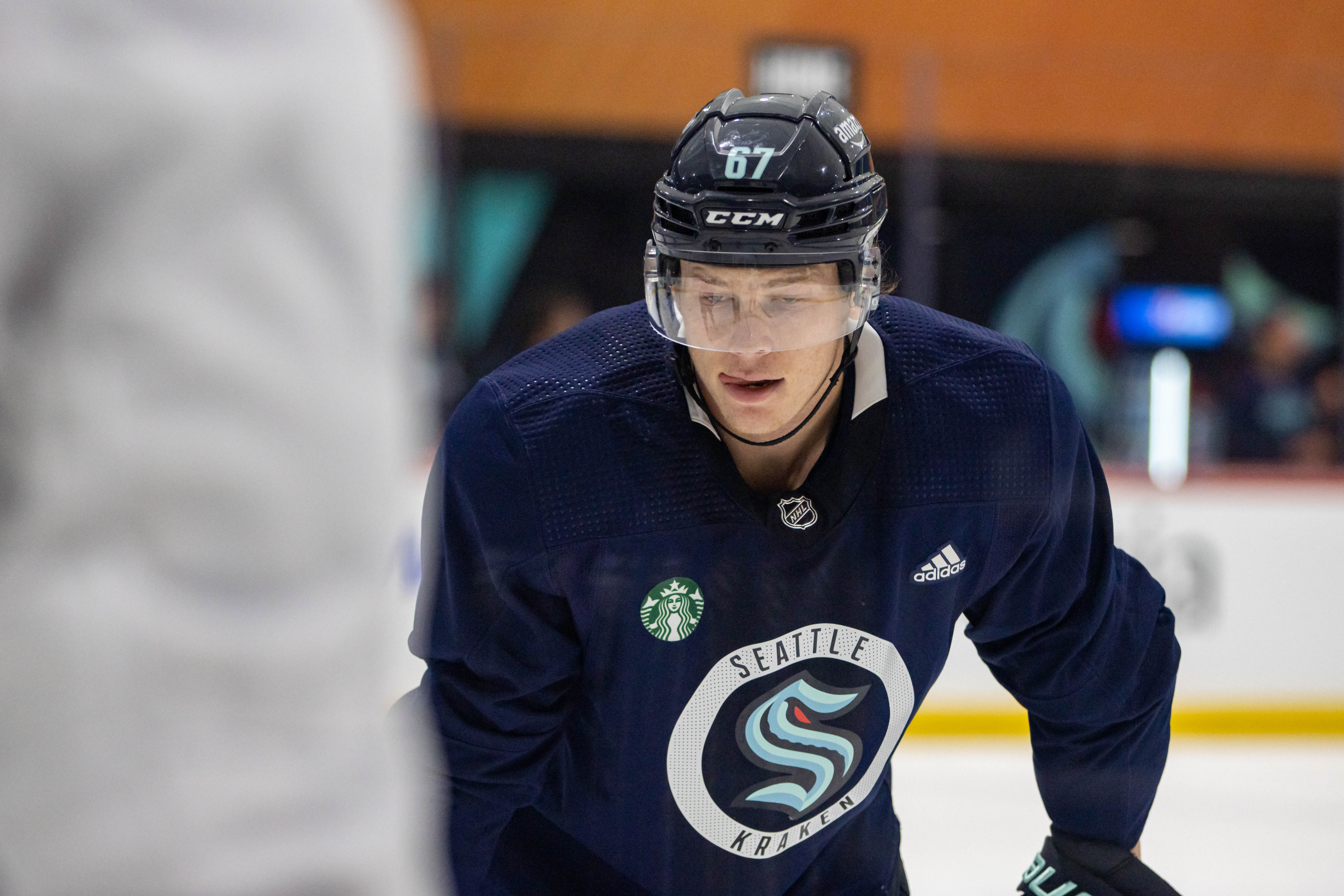
Geekie practicing with the Kraken in September 2022

Despite re-signing with the Hurricanes, Geekie was selected from the Hurricanes at the 2021 NHL expansion draft by the Seattle Kraken on July 21, 2021. He was named to the team's inaugural opening roster before the 2021–22 season. He scored his first goal with the team in their first game, on October 12, the third Kraken goal in a 4–3 loss to the Vegas Golden Knights. In 73 games during the season, Geekie totaled seven goals and 15 assists. As a restricted free agent in the offseason, Geekie filed for arbitration before settling to a one-year, US$1,400,000 contract extension with the Kraken on July 24, 2022.

During the 2022–23 season, starting on January 28, 2023, Geekie was scoreless for 10 straight games before breaking his drought by scoring two goals in a 5–3 victory over the St. Louis Blues on March 1. By the end of the season, Geekie's career-high numbers increased, after he tallied nine goals and 19 assists for 28 points in 69 games, while maintaining a +14 rating. In 13 games of the 2023 Stanley Cup playoffs, he managed two goals and two assists.

==== Boston Bruins ====
As a restricted free agent, Geekie was never extended a qualifying offer by the Kraken, turning him into an unrestricted free agent. Geekie himself only found out about the decision on Twitter. On July 1, 2023, the opening day of free agency, he signed a two-year, US$4,000,000 contract with the Boston Bruins. On February 29, 2024, he recorded the first NHL hat-trick of his career as part of a 5–4 victory against the Vegas Golden Knights. Through 76 games of the 2023–24 season, Geekie totaled 17 goals and 22 assists for 39 points, all career highs. During the 2024 Stanley Cup playoffs, he achieved four goals and one assist in 13 games.

Geekie struggled to start the 2024–25 season, scoring only two assists in his first 11 games, causing him to end up a healthy scratch for three games. In his first game back, Geekie was placed on a line with David Pastrnak and scored his first goal of the season. After that game, Geekie became a regular fixture on the Bruins' top line and by December, had returned to form, scoring goals more consistently. By February 22, 2025, Geekie had scored his 18th goal of the season, surpassing his career high. On April 5, against the Carolina Hurricanes, Geekie notched a goal and four assists in a 5–1 victory, factoring in on all Bruins goals. He hit the 30-goal mark for the first time in his career three days later against the New Jersey Devils. Geekie became the first Bruins player other than Pastrnak, Brad Marchand, or Patrice Bergeron to score 30 goals in a season since Loui Eriksson during 2015–16. Geekie finished the season with a career-high 33 goals and 24 assists for 57 points. He received the Bruins' Eddie Shore Award for "demonstrating exceptional hustle and determination," and he was named the Bruins' Third Star due to his performance during home games. He was also awarded the Bruins' Seventh Player Award, given to the player who exceeded expectations for the season. On June 29, the Bruins re-signed Geekie to a six-year, US$33,000,000 contract, preventing him from becoming a restricted free agent.

Geekie hoped to build off his career year in the 2025–26 season, and he started off hot, scoring nine goals in the first month of the season, including a six-game goal streak at the end of October. On March 5, 2026, Geekie scored his 34th goal of the season, passing his career high the previous season. However, afterwards, Geekie didn't score a goal for 17 straight games. On April 7, Geekie got back on the scoresheet against the Carolina Hurricanes, scoring thrice to register his first hat-trick of the season and the second of his career.

== International play ==
Medal record

Representing Canada

Ice hockey

World Championships
Silver medal – second place	2022 Finland	

On May 9, 2022, Geekie was named to Team Canada's roster for the 2022 IIHF World Championship. In a game on May 16, Geekie tallied a goal and added an assist in a 5–1 win against Slovakia. Canada ultimately achieved the silver medal after a 4–3 loss to Finland on May 30.

== Personal life ==
Geekie was born on July 20, 1998, in Strathclair, Manitoba, to parents Craig and Tobi. Geekie was born into an athletic family, with his father and brothers all playing the same sport. His father played with the Brandon Wheat Kings and Spokane Chiefs before turning to coaching, while his brother Noah also played hockey as a child. His younger brother Conor currently plays for the Tampa Bay Lightning and was drafted in the first round, 11th overall, by the Arizona Coyotes in the 2022 NHL entry draft.

== Career statistics ==
=== Regular season and playoffs ===
			Regular season					Playoffs
Season	Team	League	GP	G	A	Pts	PIM	GP	G	A	Pts	PIM
2013–14	Yellowhead Chiefs	MMHL	44	25	28	53	14	3	5	3	8	0
2013–14	Tri-City Americans	WHL	1	1	0	1	0	—	—	—	—	—
2014–15	Yellowhead Chiefs	MMHL	44	27	36	63	38	—	—	—	—	—
2014–15	Neepawa Natives	MJHL	2	1	1	2	0	—	—	—	—	—
2014–15	Tri-City Americans	WHL	9	0	2	2	0	2	0	0	0	0
2015–16	Tri-City Americans	WHL	66	12	13	25	10	—	—	—	—	—
2016–17	Tri-City Americans	WHL	72	35	55	90	40	4	1	0	1	4
2017–18	Tri-City Americans	WHL	68	30	54	84	32	14	17	10	27	4
2018–19	Charlotte Checkers	AHL	73	19	27	46	22	19	8	10	18	6
2019–20	Charlotte Checkers	AHL	55	22	20	42	54	—	—	—	—	—
2019–20	Carolina Hurricanes	NHL	2	3	1	4	2	8	0	1	1	0
2020–21	Carolina Hurricanes	NHL	36	3	6	9	10	3	0	0	0	0
2020–21	Chicago Wolves	AHL	2	4	1	5	2	—	—	—	—	—
2021–22	Seattle Kraken	NHL	73	7	15	22	18	—	—	—	—	—
2022–23	Seattle Kraken	NHL	69	9	19	28	24	13	2	2	4	12
2023–24	Boston Bruins	NHL	76	17	22	39	28	13	4	1	5	6
2024–25	Boston Bruins	NHL	77	33	24	57	22	—	—	—	—	—
2025–26	Boston Bruins	NHL	81	39	29	68	22	6	2	2	4	6
NHL totals			414	111	116	227	126	43	8	6	14	22

=== International ===
Year	Team	Event	Result	GP	G	A	Pts	PIM
2022	Canada	WC	2nd place, silver medalist(s)	10	1	1	2	2
Senior totals				10	1	1	2	2

== Awards and honours ==
Award	Year
WHL
West Second All-Star Team	2017
AHL
Calder Cup (Charlotte Checkers)	2019
Boston Bruins
Eddie Shore Award	2025
Bruins Three Stars Awards	2025, 2026
Seventh Player Award	2025
