= Jesper Sellgren =

Swedish ice hockey player (born 1998)

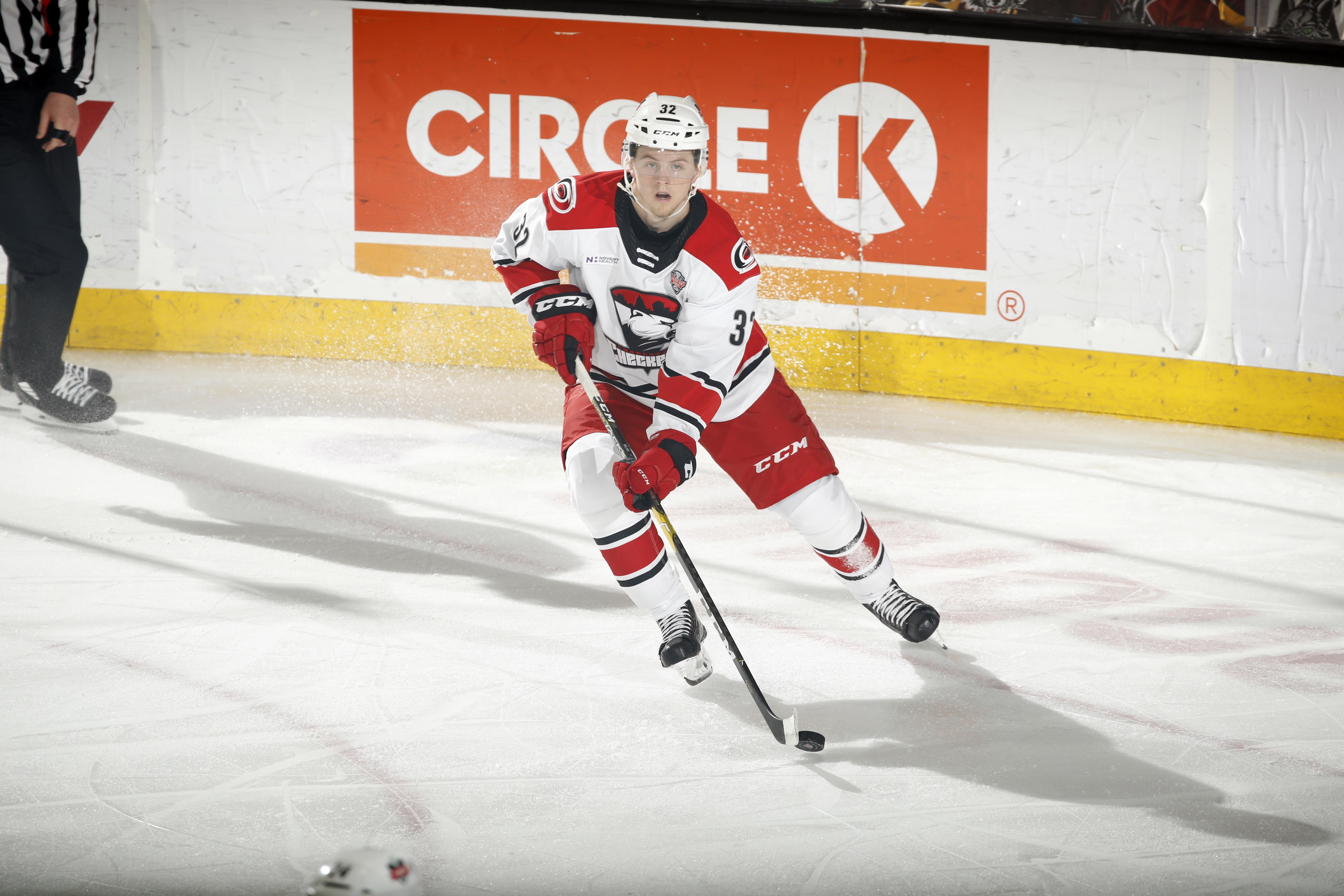
- Born: 11 June 1998 (age 28) Örnsköldsvik, Sweden
- Height: 180 cm (5 ft 11 in)
- Weight: 77 kg (170 lb; 12 st 2 lb)
- Position: Defense
- Shoots: Left
- SHL team Former teams: Luleå HF; Frölunda HC
- National team: Sweden
- NHL draft: 166th overall, 2018; Carolina Hurricanes
- Playing career: 2016–present

Jesper Sellgren (born 11 June 1998) is a Swedish ice hockey defenceman who currently plays for Luleå HF in the Swedish Hockey League (SHL). He was drafted by the Carolina Hurricanes in the sixth round, 166th overall, of the 2018 NHL entry draft.

== Playing career ==
After wrapping up his second season in the Allsvenskan in 2017–18, Sellgren departed his hometown club and signed a two-year deal with Luleå HF on 28 March 2018. Later that year, he was drafted by the Carolina Hurricanes in the sixth round, 166th overall, of the 2018 NHL entry draft.

During the 2018–19 season with Luleå HF, Sellgren tallied 15 points across 52 games. Once Luleå's campaign ended, he joined the Charlotte Checkers, the American Hockey League (AHL) affiliate of the Hurricanes, on a professional tryout contract. Shortly after, on 28 May 2019, the Hurricanes secured him with a three-year, entry-level deal.

Ahead of the 2020–21 season, as the COVID-19 pandemic caused delays to the start of professional hockey leagues across North America, Sellgren opted to stay in his home country of Sweden to maintain his playing form and continue his development. On 31 July 2020, he was loaned from the Hurricanes organization to Frölunda HC of the SHL.

Following a strong postseason performance in which he played an important role in helping the Chicago Wolves capture the Calder Cup, marking his second American Hockey League (AHL) championship win with a Carolina Hurricanes affiliate, Sellgren faced a decision regarding the next step in his career as he approached restricted free agency. On 1 July 2022, he signed a three-year contract with Luleå HF of the SHL, the team he had previously played for before joining the Hurricanes organization.

== Career statistics ==
=== Regular season and playoffs ===
			Regular season					Playoffs
Season	Team	League	GP	G	A	Pts	PIM	GP	G	A	Pts	PIM
2014–15	Modo Hockey	J20	10	0	4	4	2	—	—	—	—	—
2015–16	Modo Hockey	J20	43	1	11	12	8	2	0	0	0	2
2016–17	Modo Hockey	Allsv	50	5	5	10	8	—	—	—	—	—
2016–17	Modo Hockey	J20	3	1	0	1	0	6	0	2	2	0
2017–18	Modo Hockey	Allsv	43	3	9	12	8	—	—	—	—	—
2017–18	Modo Hockey	J20	—	—	—	—	—	6	0	2	2	2
2018–19	Luleå HF	SHL	52	3	12	15	10	10	3	3	6	6
2018–19	Charlotte Checkers	AHL	—	—	—	—	—	11	3	1	4	4
2019–20	Luleå HF	SHL	47	8	13	21	18	—	—	—	—	—
2020–21	Frölunda HC	SHL	52	3	16	19	4	7	0	0	0	2
2021–22	Chicago Wolves	AHL	73	6	20	26	22	18	0	3	3	12
2022–23	Luleå HF	SHL	47	1	10	11	6	—	—	—	—	—
2023–24	Luleå HF	SHL	50	8	10	18	17	7	1	2	3	2
2024–25	Luleå HF	SHL	50	5	14	19	6	16	1	4	5	4
2025–26	Luleå HF	SHL	52	3	14	17	8	7	1	5	6	2
SHL totals			350	31	89	120	69	47	6	14	20	16

Medal record

Representing Sweden

Ice hockey

World Junior Championships
Silver medal – second place	2018 United States	

IIHF World U18 Championship
Silver medal – second place	2016 United States	

=== International ===
Year	Team	Event	Result	GP	G	A	Pts	PIM
2016	Sweden	U18	2nd place, silver medalist(s)	7	0	1	1	0
2018	Sweden	WJC	2nd place, silver medalist(s)	7	0	1	1	2
2021	Sweden	WC	9th	4	0	1	1	0
Junior totals				14	0	2	2	2
Senior totals				4	0	1	1	0

== Awards and honours ==
Award	Year
AHL
Calder Cup (Charlotte Checkers, Chicago Wolves)	2019, 2022
SHL
Le Mat Trophy (Luleå HF)	2025
