= Daniel Carr (ice hockey) =

Canadian ice hockey player (born 1991)

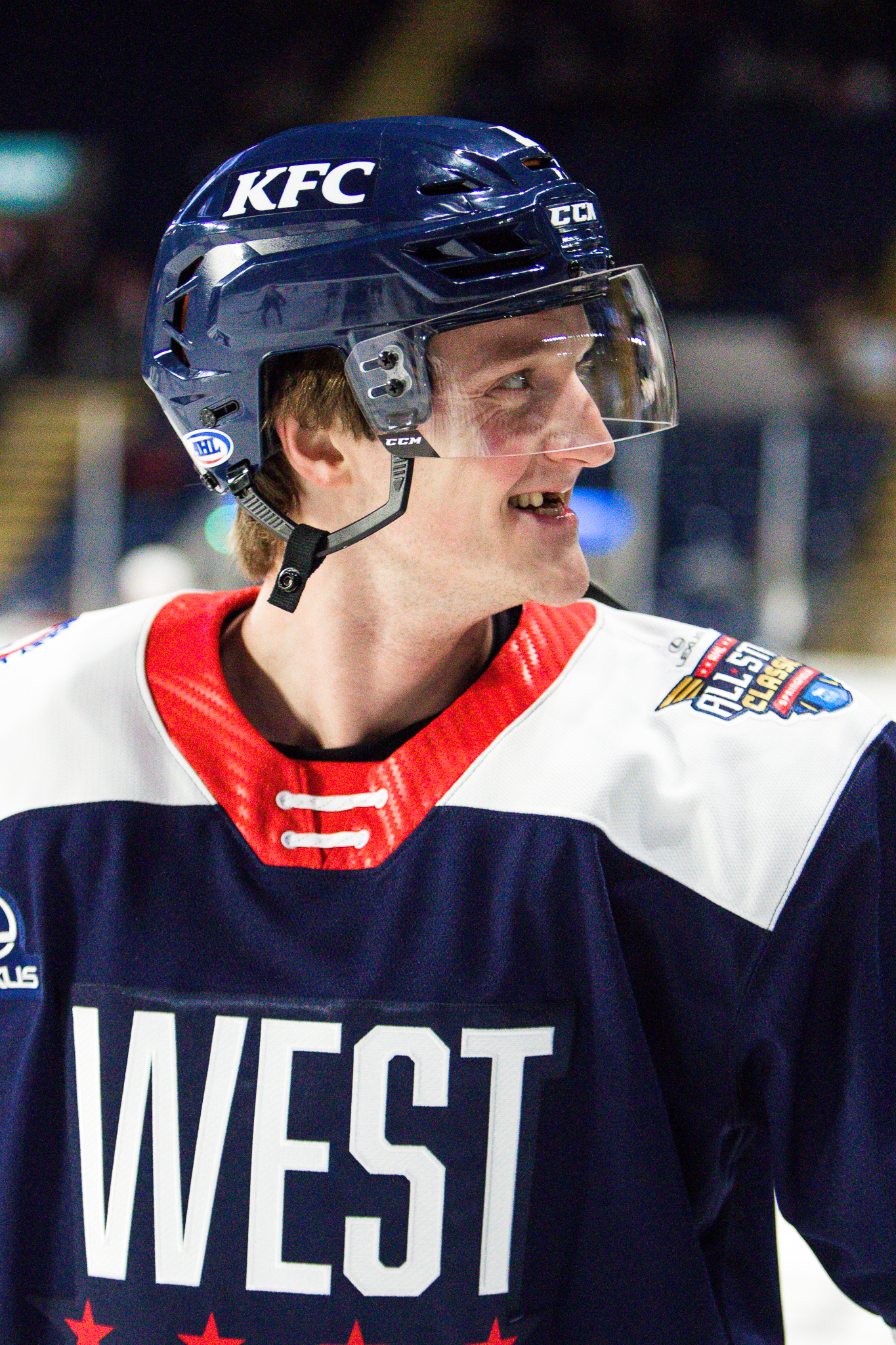
- Carr at the 2019 AHL All-Star Game
- Born: November 1, 1991 (age 34) Sherwood Park, Alberta, Canada
- Height: 6 ft 0 in (183 cm)
- Weight: 186 lb (84 kg; 13 st 4 lb)
- Position: Left wing
- Shoots: Left
- NL team Former teams: HC Ajoie; Montreal Canadiens; Vegas Golden Knights; Nashville Predators; HC Lugano; Washington Capitals
- National team: Canada
- NHL draft: Undrafted
- Playing career: 2014–present

Daniel Carr (born November 1, 1991) is a Canadian professional ice hockey forward for HC Ajoie of the National League (NL). Originally undrafted by teams in the National Hockey League (NHL), Carr has previously played for the Montreal Canadiens, Vegas Golden Knights, Nashville Predators, and Washington Capitals.

== Playing career ==
=== Collegiate ===
Carr played collegiate hockey with the Union Dutchmen in the ECAC Hockey conference of the National Collegiate Athletic Association (NCAA). In his senior year of 2013–14, Carr's outstanding play was rewarded with a selection to the ECAC Hockey All-Conference First Team.

=== Professional ===
On April 24, 2014, as an undrafted free agent, Carr signed a two-year entry-level contract with the Montreal Canadiens of the National Hockey League (NHL).

During the 2015–16 season, Carr became one of only a few NHL players to score a goal on the first shot during the first shift of their NHL debut on November 29, 2015, in a game versus the Carolina Hurricanes. He re-signed with the Canadiens on July 1, 2016.

On July 1, 2018, Carr signed a one-year, $750,000 deal with the Vegas Golden Knights after not receiving a qualifying offer from the Canadiens. In the 2018–19 season, Carr won the Les Cunningham Award as league MVP while he was assigned to the Golden Knights American Hockey League (AHL) affiliate, the Chicago Wolves. He recorded a career-best 30 goals and 41 assists for 71 points in just 52 games. He was recalled through the season to feature in six games for Vegas, registering a goal. In returning to the Wolves for the 2019 Calder Cup playoffs, Carr recorded 12 points in 15 games before falling in the Finals to the Charlotte Checkers.

On July 1, 2019, Carr agreed to a one-way $700,000 contract with the Nashville Predators for the 2019–20 season.

On September 5, 2020, as a free agent from the Predators, Carr signed a three-month contract through November 15 by HC Lugano of the National League (NL) as a replacement for injured forward Jani Lajunen. At the opening of free agency, he was signed by the Washington Capitals to a one-year, two-way contract on October 12, 2020. Due to the ongoing COVID-19 pandemic, Carr remained in Switzerland with Lugano until the commencement of the Capitals' training camp.

In the 2020–21 season, Carr served the majority of his tenure with the Capitals as a healthy scratch, registering an assist in six regular season games and drawing into a first-round playoff contest against the Boston Bruins.

As an impending free agent, Carr opted to return to Switzerland, rejoining HC Lugano on a one-year contract in July 2021. Shortly thereafter, he agreed to a three-year extension with the team on January 1, 2022.

Following the 2024–25 NL season, Carr did not sign an extension with HC Lugano and returned to North America, signing a two-year AHL contract with former club the Milwaukee Admirals on July 2, 2025.

Carr posted 31 points through 49 regular season games with the Admirals in the 2025–26 season, before opting for a release from the final year of his contract with Milwaukee to return to the Swiss NL with HC Ajoie, on a one-year agreement on August 6, 2026.

== International play ==
In January 2022, Carr was selected to play for Team Canada at the 2022 Winter Olympics.

== Career statistics ==
=== Regular season and playoffs ===
			Regular season					Playoffs
Season	Team	League	GP	G	A	Pts	PIM	GP	G	A	Pts	PIM
2007–08	St. Albert Steel	AJHL	62	16	11	27	36	5	0	0	0	0
2008–09	St. Albert Steel	AJHL	59	27	28	55	81	4	2	2	4	2
2009–10	St. Albert Steel	AJHL	30	24	30	54	15	—	—	—	—	—
2009–10	Powell River Kings	BCHL	22	10	17	27	14	23	15	11	26	10
2010–11	Union College	ECAC	40	20	15	35	28	—	—	—	—	—
2011–12	Union College	ECAC	41	20	20	40	30	—	—	—	—	—
2012–13	Union College	ECAC	40	16	16	32	26	—	—	—	—	—
2013–14	Union College	ECAC	39	22	28	50	28	—	—	—	—	—
2014–15	Hamilton Bulldogs	AHL	76	24	15	39	21	—	—	—	—	—
2015–16	St. John's IceCaps	AHL	24	10	11	21	10	—	—	—	—	—
2015–16	Montreal Canadiens	NHL	23	6	3	9	8	—	—	—	—	—
2016–17	Montreal Canadiens	NHL	33	2	7	9	6	—	—	—	—	—
2016–17	St. John's IceCaps	AHL	19	6	5	11	2	—	—	—	—	—
2017–18	Laval Rocket	AHL	20	11	8	19	14	—	—	—	—	—
2017–18	Montreal Canadiens	NHL	38	6	10	16	8	—	—	—	—	—
2018–19	Chicago Wolves	AHL	52	30	41	71	10	15	5	7	12	0
2018–19	Vegas Golden Knights	NHL	6	1	0	1	0	—	—	—	—	—
2019–20	Nashville Predators	NHL	11	1	0	1	4	—	—	—	—	—
2019–20	Milwaukee Admirals	AHL	47	23	27	50	20	—	—	—	—	—
2020–21	HC Lugano	NL	8	4	4	8	4	—	—	—	—	—
2020–21	Washington Capitals	NHL	6	0	1	1	2	1	0	0	0	2
2021–22	HC Lugano	NL	29	17	10	27	16	6	1	3	4	0
2022–23	HC Lugano	NL	30	10	4	14	45	8	4	3	7	6
2023–24	HC Lugano	NL	39	17	29	46	63	9	5	3	8	6
2024–25	HC Lugano	NL	50	16	21	37	22	6	1	3	4	4
2025–26	Milwaukee Admirals	AHL	49	16	15	31	32	—	—	—	—	—
NHL totals			117	16	21	37	28	1	0	0	0	2
NL totals			155	64	68	132	150	29	11	12	23	16

== Awards and honours ==
Medal record

Ice hockey

Representing Canada West

World Junior A Challenge
Silver medal – second place	2009 Summerside	

Award	Year	Ref
College
ECAC Hockey All-Rookie Team	2011	
ECAC All-Tournament Team	2012, 2013, 2014	
ECAC Tournament MVP	2014	
All-ECAC Third Team	2012–13	
All-ECAC First Team	2013–14	
AHCA East Second-Team All-American	2013–14	
AHL
Les Cunningham Award (MVP)	2018–19	
First All-Star Team	2018–19	
All-Star Game	2018–19	
International
Spengler Cup All-Star Team	2024	

Awards and achievements
Preceded by Troy Grosenick	ECAC Hockey Tournament Most Outstanding Player; 2014	Succeeded by Jimmy Vesey
