= Andrew Poturalski =

American ice hockey player (born 1994)

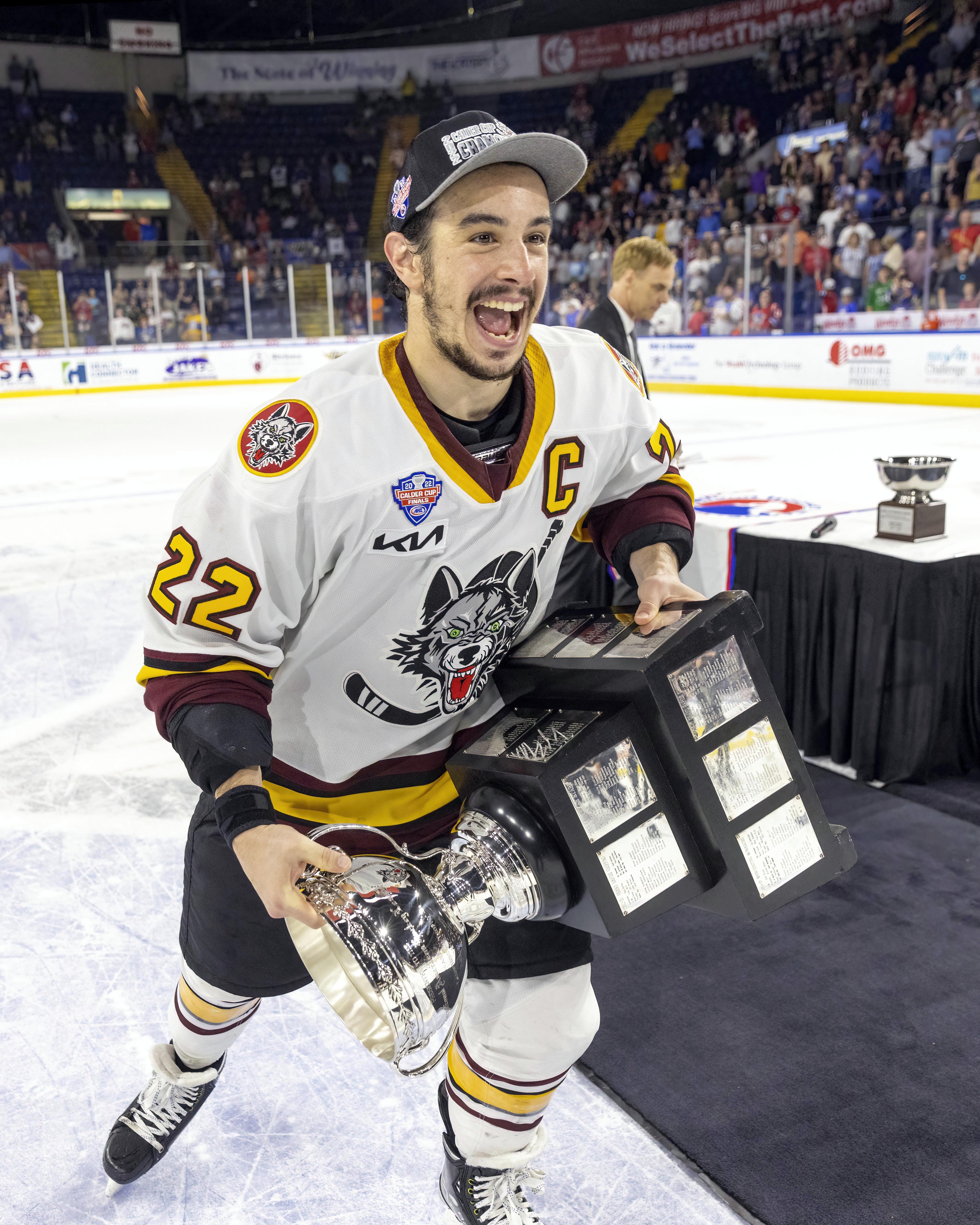
- Poturalski with the Chicago Wolves in 2022
- Born: January 14, 1994 (age 32) Williamsville, New York, U.S.
- Height: 5 ft 10 in (178 cm)
- Weight: 190 lb (86 kg; 13 st 8 lb)
- Position: Center
- Shoots: Right
- KHL team Former teams: Avangard Omsk; Carolina Hurricanes; Seattle Kraken; San Jose Sharks
- NHL draft: Undrafted
- Playing career: 2016–present

Andrew Poturalski (born January 14, 1994) is an American professional ice hockey player who is a center for Avangard Omsk of the Kontinental Hockey League (KHL).

He is a two-time winner of the American Hockey League (AHL) Calder Cup in 2019 and 2022. He is also a three-time John B. Sollenberger Trophy winner as the AHL's leading scorer for the season, one of only three players to achieve that feat, and received the Les Cunningham Award as the most valuable player of the 2024–25 AHL season.

== Early life ==
Poturalski was born on January 14, 1994, in Williamsville, New York to parents Joseph and Diane. His mother formerly played softball at Iowa and Erie Community College while his father is a football officiator. Poturalski originally wished to play goaltender but his parents convinced him to be a skater due to the price of goalie equipment.

== Playing career ==
=== Amateur ===
Growing up in New York, Poturalski played midget ice hockey with the Wheatfield Blades under former NHL player Peter Scamurra. He then enrolled at Nichols School and played on their varsity ice hockey team in the Conference of Independent Schools of Ontario Athletic Association for three seasons. While attending Nichols School in 2011, Poturalski joined the Ontario Junior Hockey League's Buffalo Jr. Sabres. Early in his rookie season, he confirmed his commitment to join the New Hampshire Wildcats men's ice hockey for the 2013–14 Hockey East season. By the end of October, Poturalski was named to the NHL Central Scouting preliminary "Watch List" for the 2012 NHL entry draft. At the time, he was tied for fourth in OJHL in scoring with 27 points as well as third with 17 assists. Poturalski finished the 2011–12 OJHL season with 16 goals and 22 assists in 33 regular season games before being loaned to the Cedar Rapids RoughRiders in the United States Hockey League. However, after playing in two games and recording three points, Poturalski's season was cut short due to a broken ankle. He then broke his fibula in a "freak on-ice accident" as he prepared over the summer for the following season.

After rehabbing his ankle, Poturalski made his 2012–13 USHL season debut mid-October and immediately scored three goals and recorded two assists. His first goal proved to be the game-winner in a 4–3 victory over the Indiana Ice while he then collected a career-high four points in a 7–5 win. As a result, Poturalski was named the co-recipient of the CCM Forward of the Week on October 23.

=== College ===
In his sophomore season with the Wildcats in 2015–16, Poturalski led the team and conference in scoring with 52 points in just 37 games. Earning select to the East First-Star Team and named as a finalist for the Hobey Baker Award, Poturalski opted to leave college early to pursue a professional career, in agreeing to a two-year entry-level contract with the Carolina Hurricanes on March 9, 2016.

=== Professional ===
During his first full professional season in 2016–17, Poturalski was initially assigned to AHL affiliate, the Charlotte Checkers. Poturalski was leading the club in assists and scoring when he received his first recall to the NHL by the Hurricanes on April 4, 2017. He made his debut that night in a 5–3 defeat to the Minnesota Wild. After two games with the Hurricanes, Poturalski was returned to Charlotte to play out the remainder of the year.

Following that season, Poturalski was invited to the Hurricanes training camp but began the 2017–18 season with the Checkers after being cut.

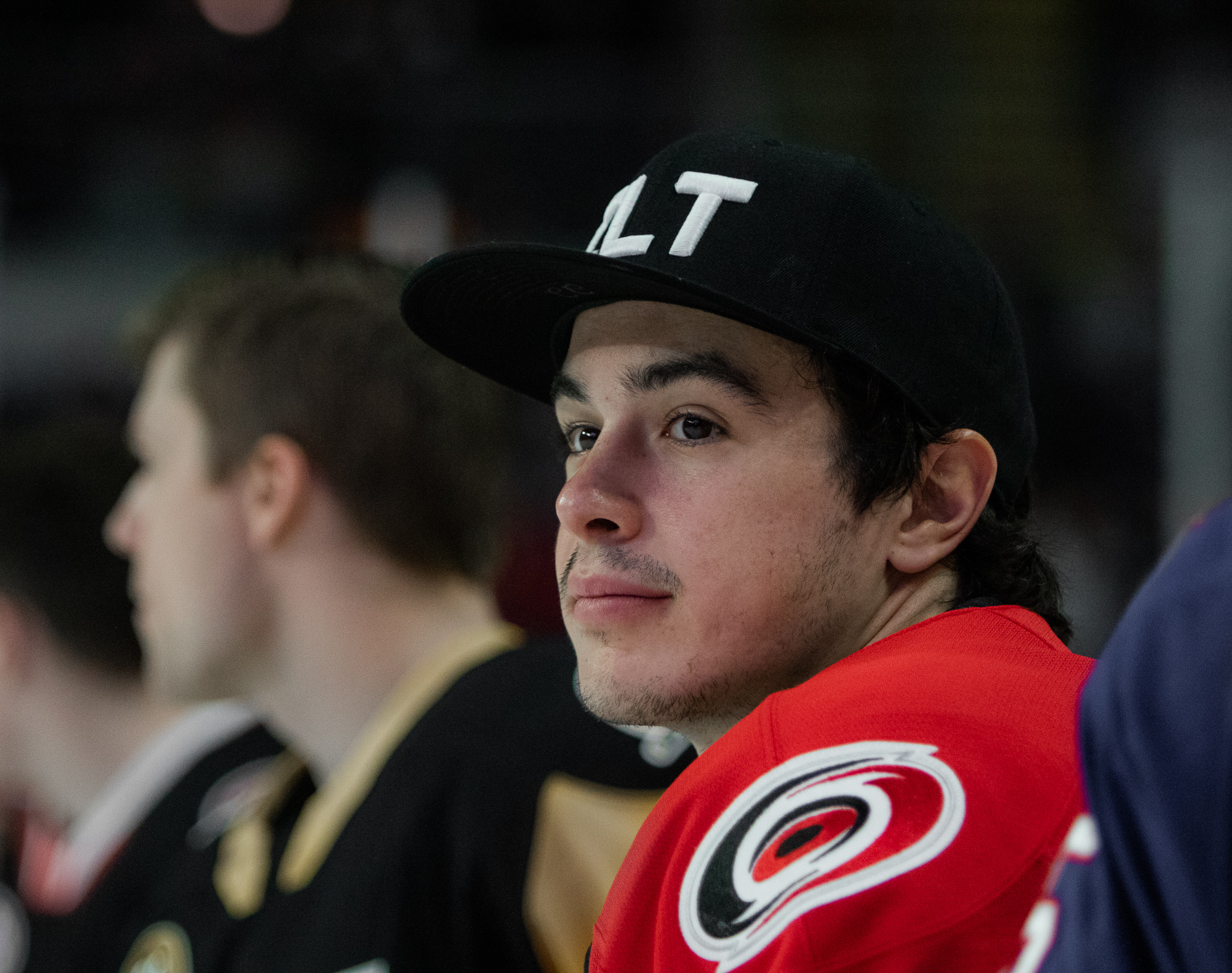
Poturalski during the 2019 AHL All-Star Skills Competition

In the 2018–19 season, had a stand out season with the league leading Charlotte Checkers, scoring 23 goals and 70 points in 72 games, to earning a selection to the AHL Second All-Star Team. In the post-season, he led the Checkers to the 2019 Calder Cup Championship after collecting 12 goals and 23 points. Poturalski was named the Jack A. Butterfield Trophy as the playoffs MVP after leading all skaters in points and goals.

On July 2, 2019, Poturalski left the Hurricanes organization as a free agent to sign a one-year, two-way contract with the Anaheim Ducks.

After a successful stint in the AHL with the San Diego Gulls, Poturalski returned to the Hurricanes as a free agent, signing a one-year, two-way contract on August 11, 2021.

As a free agent at the conclusion of his contract with the Hurricanes, Poturalski was signed to a two-year, $1.525 million contract with the Seattle Kraken on July 13, 2022.

Poturalski (center of photo) playing for the Coachella Firebirds in a 2024 Calder Cup Playoffs against the Milwaukee Admirals

After helping the Kraken's AHL affiliate, the Coachella Valley Firebirds reach the Calder Cup finals in each season under contract with the Kraken, Poturalski left as a free agent and was signed to a two-year, two-way contract with the San Jose Sharks on July 3, 2024. He appeared in three games with the Sharks, recording one assist, but spent the bulk of the 2024–25 season in the AHL with the San Jose Barracuda. In 59 games he scored a career-best 30 goals, and with 73 points he led the league for the third in his career. Poturalski became only the third player to win the Sollenberger Trophy three times, and for the first time was given the Les Cunningham Award as the most valuable player of the regular season. He also received his second First Team All-Star selection.

Despite having a year to remaining on his deal with the Sharks, on May 30, 2025, Poturalski was granted a release from his contract in order to pursue a career abroad. On July 27, 2025, Poturalski agreed to a one-year contract with Russian club, Avangard Omsk of the KHL, for the 2025–26 season.

== Personal life ==
Poturalski and his wife Haley have two children together; a son and daughter.

== Career statistics ==
| | | | Regular season | | | | | Playoffs |
| Season | Team | League | GP | G | A | Pts | PIM | GP | G | A | Pts | PIM |
|---|---|---|---|---|---|---|---|---|---|---|---|---|
| 2008–09 | Nichols School | USHS | 21 | 13 | 6 | 19 | 6 | — | — | — | — | — |
| 2010–11 | Nichols School | USHS | 14 | 13 | 10 | 23 | 26 | 4 | 8 | 0 | 8 | 4 |
| 2011–12 | Buffalo Jr. Sabres | OJHL | 33 | 16 | 22 | 38 | 32 | 8 | 5 | 2 | 7 | 4 |
| 2011–12 | Cedar Rapids RoughRiders | USHL | 2 | 2 | 1 | 3 | 0 | — | — | — | — | — |
| 2012–13 | Cedar Rapids RoughRiders | USHL | 53 | 12 | 21 | 33 | 43 | — | — | — | — | — |
| 2013–14 | Cedar Rapids RoughRiders | USHL | 60 | 27 | 37 | 64 | 28 | 4 | 2 | 1 | 3 | 2 |
| 2014–15 | University of New Hampshire | HE | 40 | 14 | 15 | 29 | 16 | — | — | — | — | — |
| 2015–16 | University of New Hampshire | HE | 37 | 22 | 30 | 52 | 24 | — | — | — | — | — |
| 2015–16 | Charlotte Checkers | AHL | 16 | 2 | 3 | 5 | 0 | — | — | — | — | — |
| 2016–17 | Charlotte Checkers | AHL | 74 | 19 | 33 | 52 | 34 | 5 | 0 | 0 | 0 | 5 |
| 2016–17 | Carolina Hurricanes | NHL | 2 | 0 | 0 | 0 | 0 | — | — | — | — | — |
| 2017–18 | Charlotte Checkers | AHL | 76 | 22 | 27 | 49 | 24 | 8 | 1 | 4 | 5 | 2 |
| 2018–19 | Charlotte Checkers | AHL | 72 | 23 | 47 | 70 | 34 | 18 | 12 | 11 | 23 | 12 |
| 2019–20 | San Diego Gulls | AHL | 17 | 2 | 5 | 7 | 8 | — | — | — | — | — |
| 2020–21 | San Diego Gulls | AHL | 44 | 9 | 34 | 43 | 10 | 3 | 0 | 0 | 0 | 0 |
| 2021–22 | Chicago Wolves | AHL | 71 | 28 | 73 | 101 | 36 | 18 | 8 | 15 | 23 | 26 |
| 2021–22 | Carolina Hurricanes | NHL | 2 | 0 | 2 | 2 | 0 | — | — | — | — | — |
| 2022–23 | Coachella Valley Firebirds | AHL | 38 | 11 | 31 | 42 | 14 | 16 | 3 | 9 | 12 | 6 |
| 2023–24 | Coachella Valley Firebirds | AHL | 60 | 15 | 36 | 51 | 30 | 13 | 2 | 8 | 10 | 14 |
| 2023–24 | Seattle Kraken | NHL | 2 | 0 | 0 | 0 | 0 | — | — | — | — | — |
| 2024–25 | San Jose Barracuda | AHL | 59 | 30 | 43 | 73 | 34 | — | — | — | — | — |
| 2024–25 | San Jose Sharks | NHL | 3 | 0 | 1 | 1 | 2 | — | — | — | — | — |
| 2025–26 | Avangard Omsk | KHL | 67 | 27 | 39 | 66 | 32 | 17 | 4 | 9 | 13 | 8 |
| NHL totals | | | 9 | 0 | 3 | 3 | 2 | — | — | — | — | — |
| KHL totals | | | 67 | 27 | 39 | 66 | 32 | 17 | 4 | 9 | 13 | 8 |

== Awards and honors ==
| Award | Year | Ref |
OJHL
| Second All-Prospect Team | 2012 | |
USHL
| All-Star Game | 2014 | |
College
| Hockey East First All-Star Team | 2016 | |
| Hockey East Scoring Champion | 2016 | |
| East First All-American Team | 2016 | |
AHL
| Second All-Star Team | 2019 | |
| Calder Cup champion | 2019, 2022 | |
| Jack A. Butterfield Trophy | 2019 | |
| Pacific Division All-Star Team | 2021 | |
| John B. Sollenberger Trophy | 2021, 2022, 2025 | |
| First All-Star Team | 2022, 2025 | |
| Les Cunningham Award | 2025 | |

Awards and achievements
| Preceded by Jack Eichel | Hockey East Scoring Champion; 2015–16 | Succeeded by Tyler Kelleher |
