= Chris Mueller (ice hockey) =

American ice hockey forward (born 1986)

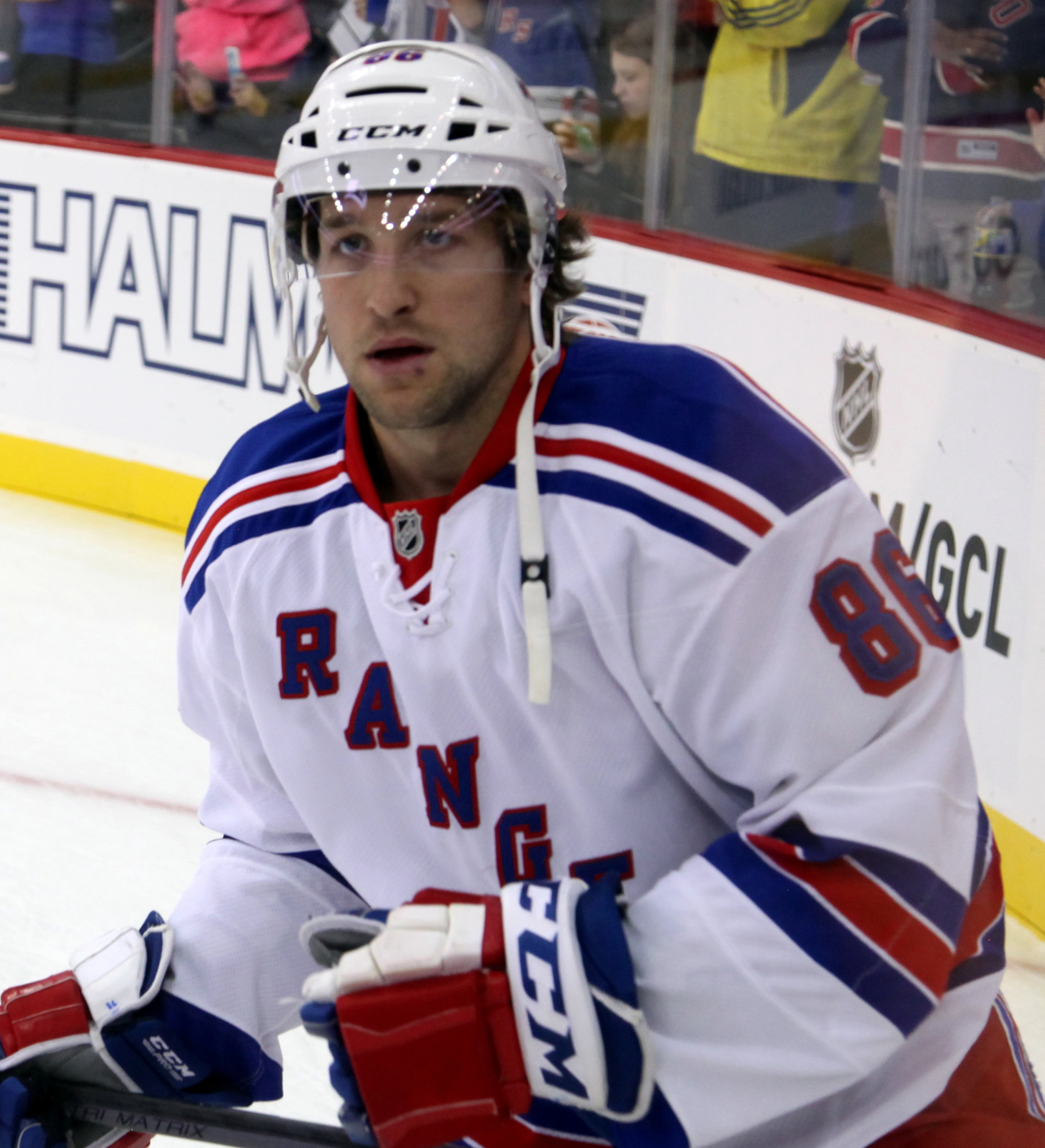
- Mueller with the New York Rangers in 2014
- Born: March 6, 1986 (age 40) West Seneca, New York, U.S.
- Height: 5 ft 11 in (180 cm)
- Weight: 203 lb (92 kg; 14 st 7 lb)
- Position: Center
- Shot: Right
- Played for: Nashville Predators; Dallas Stars; New York Rangers
- NHL draft: Undrafted
- Playing career: 2008–2021

Christopher M. Mueller (born March 6, 1986) is an American professional ice hockey forward. He played in the National Hockey League (NHL) with the Nashville Predators, Dallas Stars and the New York Rangers.

== Playing career ==
Undrafted, Mueller attended Michigan State University where he played four full seasons of collegiate hockey in the CCHA.

In the 2010–11 season, on December 27, 2010, Mueller signed a one-year contract with the Predators from American Hockey League affiliate, the Milwaukee Admirals. On December 28, 2010, Mueller made his NHL debut with the Predators in a 4–2 defeat against the Dallas Stars.

On July 7, 2011, Mueller re-signed to a one-year contract with the Predators.

On July 8, 2013, Mueller left the Predators organization after three seasons and signed a one-year contract with the Dallas Stars. On October 14, 2013, after skating in just one NHL contest with the Dallas Stars, Mueller was assigned to play with the Texas Stars of the AHL.

On July 1, 2014, for a second consecutive year, Mueller was on the move, joining his third NHL club, the New York Rangers, on a one-year deal.

Mueller familiarly signed a one-year, two-way contract as a free agent with the Anaheim Ducks on July 1, 2015. In the 2015–16 season, Mueller was assigned to newly relaunched AHL affiliate, the San Diego Gulls. He continued his offensive prowess in the American League, contributing with 57 points in 63 games.

Unable to feature with the Ducks, Mueller left at the conclusion of his contract to sign as a free agent to a one-year, two-way deal with the Arizona Coyotes on July 1, 2016. Mueller played the entirety of the 2016–17 season with the Coyotes AHL affiliate, the Tucson Roadrunners, for their inaugural season. As a veteran on the club, he led the Roadrunners in scoring with 67 points in 68 games.

On July 1, 2017, Mueller left the Coyotes as a free agent and signed a two-year, two-way deal with the Toronto Maple Leafs.

On the opening day of free agency, having concluded a successful tenure within the Maple Leafs organization, Mueller agreed to a one-year, two-way contract with the Tampa Bay Lightning on July 1, 2019. In the 2019–20 season, Mueller registered 23 points in 31 contests with the Lightning's AHL affiliate, the Syracuse Crunch, before he traded by Tampa Bay in a return to the Anaheim Ducks organization in exchange for Patrick Sieloff on December 31, 2019. He was immediately assigned by the Ducks to the San Diego Gulls, returning for a second stint after playing with the Gulls in their inaugural season.

As a free agent heading into the pandemic delayed 2020–21 season, Mueller was signed to a one-year AHL contract with the Lehigh Valley Phantoms, affiliate to the Philadelphia Flyers, on January 26, 2021.

== Career statistics ==
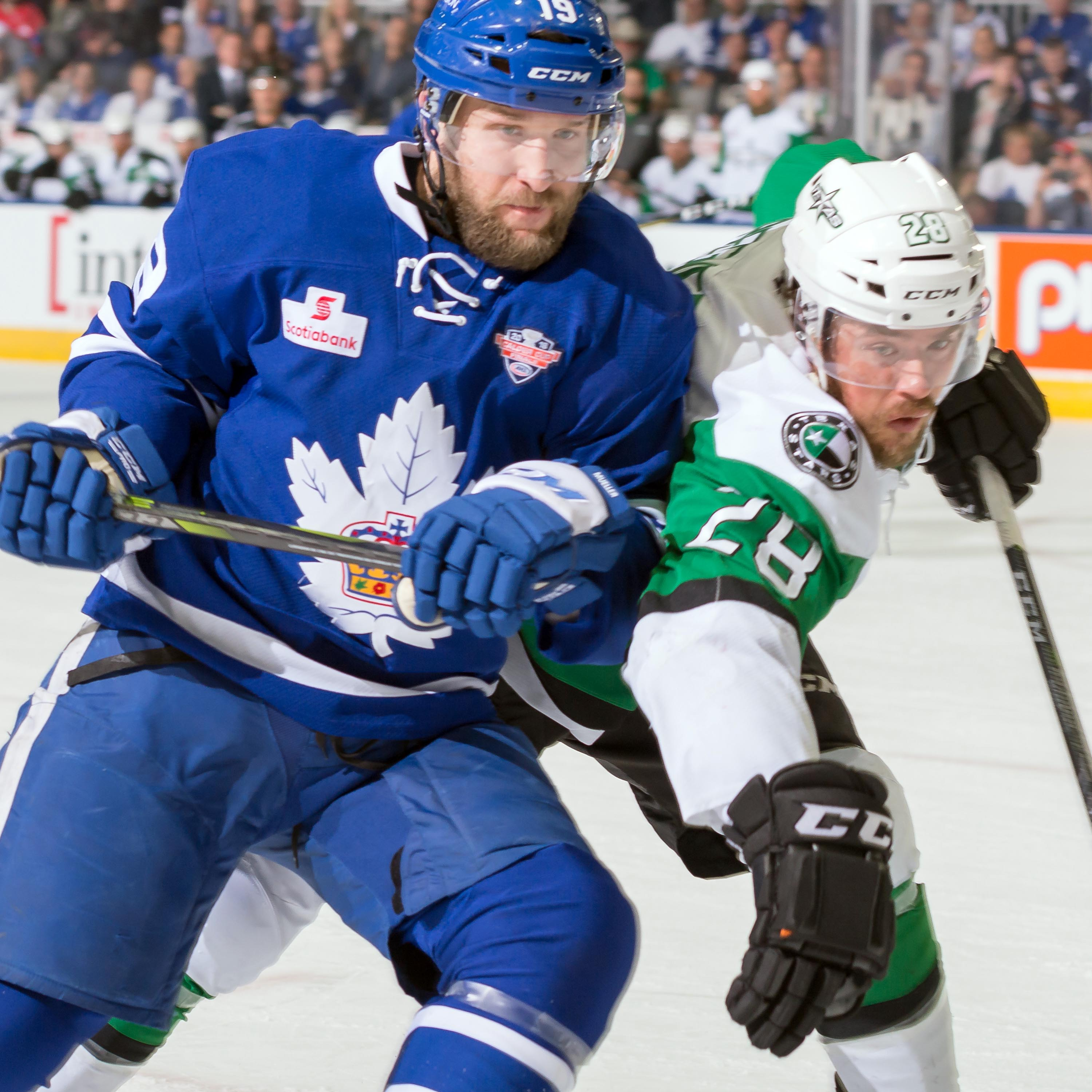
Mueller (left) with the Toronto Marlies during the 2018 Calder Cup Final.

			Regular season					Playoffs
Season	Team	League	GP	G	A	Pts	PIM	GP	G	A	Pts	PIM
2004–05	Michigan State University	CCHA	41	2	16	18	32	—	—	—	—	—
2005–06	Michigan State University	CCHA	41	11	16	27	47	—	—	—	—	—
2006–07	Michigan State University	CCHA	42	16	16	32	30	—	—	—	—	—
2007–08	Michigan State University	CCHA	42	13	14	27	32	—	—	—	—	—
2007–08	Grand Rapids Griffins	AHL	2	0	0	0	0	—	—	—	—	—
2008–09	Lake Erie Monsters	AHL	59	5	11	16	23	—	—	—	—	—
2008–09	Johnstown Chiefs	ECHL	3	3	3	6	2	—	—	—	—	—
2009–10	Cincinnati Cyclones	ECHL	5	4	1	5	0	—	—	—	—	—
2009–10	Milwaukee Admirals	AHL	67	13	14	27	37	7	3	2	5	4
2010–11	Milwaukee Admirals	AHL	67	24	26	50	34	13	4	7	11	13
2010–11	Nashville Predators	NHL	15	0	3	3	2	—	—	—	—	—
2011–12	Milwaukee Admirals	AHL	73	32	28	60	30	3	1	0	1	0
2011–12	Nashville Predators	NHL	4	0	0	0	0	—	—	—	—	—
2012–13	Milwaukee Admirals	AHL	55	18	18	36	35	2	0	0	0	2
2012–13	Nashville Predators	NHL	18	2	3	5	6	—	—	—	—	—
2013–14	Texas Stars	AHL	60	25	32	57	29	19	6	5	11	12
2013–14	Dallas Stars	NHL	9	0	0	0	0	4	0	0	0	2
2014–15	Hartford Wolf Pack	AHL	64	14	26	40	26	15	5	4	9	6
2014–15	New York Rangers	NHL	7	1	1	2	0	—	—	—	—	—
2015–16	San Diego Gulls	AHL	63	20	37	57	50	9	4	7	11	6
2016–17	Tucson Roadrunners	AHL	68	19	48	67	48	—	—	—	—	—
2017–18	Toronto Marlies	AHL	73	19	33	52	30	20	4	12	16	6
2018–19	Toronto Marlies	AHL	60	33	32	65	32	13	5	5	10	2
2019–20	Syracuse Crunch	AHL	31	11	12	23	24	—	—	—	—	—
2019–20	San Diego Gulls	AHL	29	8	7	15	10	—	—	—	—	—
2020–21	Lehigh Valley Phantoms	AHL	32	6	8	14	8	—	—	—	—	—
NHL totals			53	3	7	10	8	4	0	0	0	2

== Awards and honors ==
Award	Year
AHL
All-Star Game	2012
Calder Cup (Texas Stars)	2014
Calder Cup (Toronto Marlies)	2018
Second All-Star Team	2019
