= 2018–19 AHL season =

- League: American Hockey League
- Sport: Ice hockey
- Duration: October 5, 2018 – April 15, 2019

Regular season
- Macgregor Kilpatrick Trophy: Charlotte Checkers
- Season MVP: Daniel Carr (Chicago)
- Top scorer: Carter Verhaeghe (Syracuse)

Playoffs
- Playoffs MVP: Andrew Poturalski (Charlotte)

Calder Cup
- Champions: Charlotte Checkers
- Runners-up: Chicago Wolves

AHL seasons
- 2017–18 2019–20

The 2018–19 AHL season was the 83rd season of the American Hockey League. The regular season began October 5, 2018, and ended April 15, 2019. The 2019 Calder Cup playoffs followed the conclusion of the regular season. This was the last year the Calder Cup was awarded until 2022.

== League changes ==
The league expanded by adding the Colorado Eagles to the Pacific Division and moved the two Texas-based teams to the Central Division from the Pacific. The Cleveland Monsters were moved from the Central to the North Division.

Similar to the California and Arizona teams in the Pacific Division, Colorado plays 68 games in the regular season. This gave the Pacific Division a balanced schedule for the first time since its creation in 2015 and removed the necessity for playoff qualification based on points percentage. Continuing from previous seasons, the teams in the Atlantic, North, and Central Divisions all play 76 games. The Macgregor Kilpatrick Trophy for the regular season champion is still awarded based on points percentage.

=== Team and NHL affiliation changes ===
After the National Hockey League (NHL) added the Vegas Golden Knights for the 2017–18 season, the NHL had 31 teams while the AHL still had 30. After exploring other AHL expansion options, the NHL Vegas expansion team eventually affiliated with the Chicago Wolves on a multi-year agreement. The affiliation with the Wolves left their former affiliate, the St. Louis Blues, without an affiliate and the Blues would send players to the Wolves and the San Antonio Rampage, the affiliate of the Colorado Avalanche.

After the 2017 Board of Governors meeting, the league confirmed that it had made a commitment to an expansion applicant for a 31st team for the 2018–19 season later revealed to be the Colorado Eagles. The Eagles organization had been a member of the ECHL prior to the promotion and was the affiliate of the Avalanche. The Eagles join other recently added ECHL markets in the AHL such as Bakersfield, Charlotte, Ontario, and Stockton. The Blues then became the primary affiliate of the Rampage.

==== Affiliation changes ====
AHL team	New affiliate	Old affiliate
Colorado Eagles	Colorado Avalanche	Expansion team
San Antonio Rampage	St. Louis Blues (Note: Although the Blues sent players to the Rampage the previous season, they were not the Rampage's primary NHL affiliate and only had a working agreement.)	Colorado Avalanche

== Final standings ==
y– indicates team clinched division and a playoff spot
x– indicates team clinched a playoff spot
e– indicates team was eliminated from playoff contention

=== Eastern Conference ===
As of April 14, 2019

Atlantic Division	GP	W	L	OTL	SOL	Pts	Pts%	GF	GA
y–Charlotte Checkers (CAR)	76	51	17	7	1	110	.724	255	189
x–Bridgeport Sound Tigers (NYI)	76	43	24	6	3	95	.625	233	228
x–Hershey Bears (WSH)	76	43	25	4	4	94	.618	211	215
x–Providence Bruins (BOS)	76	38	27	8	3	87	.572	228	212
e–Lehigh Valley Phantoms (PHI)	76	39	30	4	3	85	.559	240	244
e–Wilkes-Barre/Scranton Penguins (PIT)	76	36	30	7	3	82	.539	232	228
e–Springfield Thunderbirds (FLA)	76	33	29	9	5	80	.526	250	241
e–Hartford Wolf Pack (NYR)	76	29	36	7	4	69	.454	209	266

North Division	GP	W	L	OTL	SOL	Pts	Pts%	GF	GA
y–Syracuse Crunch (TBL)	76	47	21	4	4	102	.671	264	187
x–Rochester Americans (BUF)	76	46	23	5	2	99	.651	254	218
x–Toronto Marlies (TOR)	76	39	24	9	4	91	.599	248	243
x–Cleveland Monsters (CBJ)	76	37	29	8	2	84	.553	232	234
e–Belleville Senators (OTT)	76	37	31	3	5	82	.539	228	228
e–Utica Comets (VAN)	76	34	34	6	2	76	.500	224	257
e–Laval Rocket (MTL)	76	30	34	6	6	72	.474	195	231
e–Binghamton Devils (NJD)	76	28	41	7	0	63	.414	201	278

=== Western Conference ===
As of April 14, 2019

Central Division	GP	W	L	OTL	SOL	Pts	Pts%	GF	GA
y–Chicago Wolves (VGK)	76	44	22	6	4	98	.645	250	199
x–Milwaukee Admirals (NSH)	76	36	24	14	2	88	.579	217	207
x–Iowa Wild (MIN)	76	37	26	8	5	87	.572	242	230
x–Grand Rapids Griffins (DET)	76	38	27	7	4	87	.572	217	222
e–Manitoba Moose (WPG)	76	39	30	5	2	85	.559	197	219
e–Texas Stars (DAL)	76	37	31	4	4	82	.539	238	231
e–Rockford IceHogs (CHI)	76	35	31	4	6	80	.526	184	214
e–San Antonio Rampage (STL)	76	31	38	6	1	69	.454	196	244

Pacific Division	GP	W	L	OTL	SOL	Pts	Pts%	GF	GA
y–Bakersfield Condors (EDM)	68	42	21	3	2	89	.654	242	182
x–San Jose Barracuda (SJS)	68	39	22	3	4	85	.625	227	197
x–San Diego Gulls (ANA)	68	36	24	5	3	80	.588	239	221
x–Colorado Eagles (COL)	68	36	27	4	1	77	.560	191	205
e–Tucson Roadrunners (ARI)	68	34	26	5	3	76	.559	206	202
e–Stockton Heat (CGY)	68	31	31	4	2	68	.500	235	252
e–Ontario Reign (LAK)	68	25	33	6	4	60	.441	213	274

== Statistical leaders ==
=== Leading skaters ===
The following players are sorted by points, then goals. Updated as of April 14, 2019.

GP = Games played; G = Goals; A = Assists; Pts = Points; +/– = P Plus–minus; PIM = Penalty minutes

Player	Team	GP	G	A	Pts	PIM
Carter Verhaeghe	Syracuse Crunch	76	34	48	82	34
Jeremy Bracco	Toronto Marlies	75	22	57	79	16
Daniel Carr	Chicago Wolves	52	30	41	71	10
T. J. Tynan	Chicago Wolves	71	12	59	71	28
Andrew Poturalski	Charlotte Checkers	72	23	47	70	34
Alex Barre-Boulet	Syracuse Crunch	74	34	34	68	16
Cal O'Reilly	Iowa Wild	67	16	51	67	14
Tyler Benson	Bakersfield Condors	68	15	51	66	44
Chris Mueller	Toronto Marlies	60	33	32	65	32
Michael Sgarbossa	Hershey Bears	75	30	35	65	91

=== Leading goaltenders ===
The following goaltenders with a minimum 1500 minutes played lead the league in goals against average. Updated as of April 14, 2019.

GP = Games played; TOI = Time on ice (in minutes); SA = Shots against; GA = Goals against; SO = Shutouts; GAA = Goals against average; SV% = Save percentage; W = Wins; L = Losses; OT = Overtime/shootout loss

Player	Team	GP	TOI	SA	GA	SO	GAA	SV%	W	L	OT
Alex Nedeljkovic	Charlotte Checkers	51	2917:19	1306	110	4	2.26	.916	34	9	5
Marcus Hogberg	Belleville Senators	39	2304:28	1068	89	2	2.32	.917	21	11	6
Shane Starrett	Bakersfield Condors	42	2447:41	1156	95	4	2.33	.918	27	7	5
Edward Pasquale	Syracuse Crunch	45	2650:11	1241	104	4	2.35	.916	27	12	6
Troy Grosenick	Milwaukee Admirals	46	2633:49	1316	106	1	2.41	.919	24	14	6

== Calder Cup playoffs ==
=== Playoff format ===
The 2019 Calder Cup playoffs format was retained from the divisional format of the 2016 Calder Cup playoffs. During the regular season, teams receive two points for a win and one point for an overtime or shootout loss. The top four teams in each division ranked by points qualify for the 2019 Calder Cup playoffs.

The 2019 Calder Cup playoffs features a divisional playoff format, leading to conference finals and ultimately the Calder Cup finals. The division semifinals are best-of-five series; all subsequent rounds are best-of-seven.

=== Bracket ===
Division semifinals	Division finals
A1	Charlotte	3
A4	Providence	1
A1	Charlotte	4
A3	Hershey	0
A2	Bridgeport	2
A3	Hershey	3
Eastern Conference
N1	Syracuse	1
N4	Cleveland	3
N4	Cleveland	0
N3	Toronto	4
N2	Rochester	0
N3	Toronto	3
C1	Chicago	3
C4	Grand Rapids	2
C1	Chicago	4
C3	Iowa	2
C2	Milwaukee	2
C3	Iowa	3
Western Conference
P1	Bakersfield	3
P4	Colorado	1
P1	Bakersfield	2
P3	San Diego	4
P2	San Jose	1
P3	San Diego	3

Conference finals
A1	Charlotte	4
N3	Toronto	2
C1	Chicago	4
P3	San Diego	2

Calder Cup final
A1	Charlotte	4
C1	Chicago	1

== AHL awards ==
Award	Winner
Calder Cup	Charlotte Checkers
Les Cunningham Award	Daniel Carr, Chicago
John B. Sollenberger Trophy	Carter Verhaeghe, Syracuse
Willie Marshall Award	Carter Verhaeghe, Syracuse; Alex Barre-Boulet, Syracuse
Dudley "Red" Garrett Memorial Award	Alex Barre-Boulet, Syracuse
Eddie Shore Award	Zach Redmond, Rochester
Aldege "Baz" Bastien Memorial Award	Alex Nedeljkovic, Charlotte
Harry "Hap" Holmes Memorial Award	Edward Pasquale, Syracuse
Louis A. R. Pieri Memorial Award	Mike Vellucci, Charlotte
Fred T. Hunt Memorial Award	Brett Sutter, Ontario
Yanick Dupre Memorial Award	Landon Ferraro, Iowa
Jack A. Butterfield Trophy	Andrew Poturalski, Charlotte
Richard F. Canning Trophy	Charlotte Checkers
Robert W. Clarke Trophy	Chicago Wolves
Macgregor Kilpatrick Trophy	Charlotte Checkers
Frank Mathers Trophy (Eastern Conference regular season champions)	Charlotte Checkers
Norman R. "Bud" Poile Trophy (Western Conference regular season champions)	Bakersfield Condors
Emile Francis Trophy (Atlantic Division regular season champions)	Charlotte Checkers
F. G. "Teddy" Oke Trophy (North Division regular season champions)	Syracuse Crunch
Sam Pollock Trophy (Central Division regular season champions)	Chicago Wolves
John D. Chick Trophy (Pacific Division regular season champions)	Bakersfield Condors
James C. Hendy Memorial Award	Nathan Costa, Springfield
Thomas Ebright Memorial Award	Todd Frederickson, Iowa
James H. Ellery Memorial Awards	Mike Griffith, Bakersfield
Ken McKenzie Award	Paul Branecky, Charlotte
Michael Condon Memorial Award	Fred Hudy; Carl Sasyn
President's Awards	Organization: Iowa; Player: Andrew Poturalski, Charlotte

=== All-Star teams ===
First All-Star Team

- Alex Nedeljkovic (G) – Charlotte
- John Gilmour (D) – Hartford
- Zach Redmond (D) – Rochester
- Jeremy Bracco (F) – Toronto
- Daniel Carr (F) – Chicago
- Carter Verhaeghe (F) – Syracuse

Second All-Star Team

- Shane Starrett (G) – Bakersfield
- Aaron Ness (D) – Hershey
- Ethan Prow (D) – Wilkes-Barre/Scranton
- Tyler Benson (F) – Bakersfield
- Chris Mueller (F) – Toronto
- Andrew Poturalski (F) – Charlotte

All-Rookie Team

- Shane Starrett (G) – Bakersfield
- Jake Bean (D) – Charlotte
- Mitch Reinke (D) – San Antonio
- Drake Batherson (F) – Belleville
- Tyler Benson (F) – Bakersfield
- Alex Barre-Boulet (F) – Syracuse

== See also ==
- List of AHL seasons
- 2018 in ice hockey
- 2019 in ice hockey

Preceded by 2017–18	AHL seasons	Succeeded by 2019–20
