= 2023 Calder Cup playoffs =

American Hockey League postseason tournament

Tournament details
- Dates: April 18 – June 21, 2023
- Teams: 23

Final positions
- Champions: Hershey Bears
- Runners-up: Coachella Valley Firebirds

Tournament statistics
- Scoring leader(s): Kole Lind (Firebirds) (31 points)

Awards
- MVP: Hunter Shepard (Bears)

The 2023 Calder Cup playoffs was the postseason tournament of the American Hockey League (AHL) to determine the winner of the Calder Cup, which is awarded to the AHL playoff champions from the 2022–23 AHL season.

The 2023 playoffs began on April 18, 2023, with the 23-team playoff format that was introduced in 2022. All teams except the bottom two teams of the Atlantic, North, and Central divisions, as well as the bottom three teams of the Pacific division qualified for the playoffs. Each division has a best-of-three series in the first round to determine the top 16 teams for the division semifinals, with various teams receiving byes based on regular season performance.

The 16 teams that remain—four from each division—will play a best-of-five series in the division semifinals, with the playoffs continuing with another best-of-five series for the division finals and a best-of-seven series for the conference finals and Calder Cup finals.

The Hershey Bears defeated the Coachella Valley Firebirds in overtime of game seven, granting Hershey their 12th Calder Cup in team history and first since 2010. This was only the second time a game seven went to overtime in the finals, and the first since 1953.

== Playoff seeds ==
After the 2022–23 AHL regular season, 23 teams qualified for the playoffs. The top 5 teams in the North and Central divisions, the top 6 teams in the Atlantic division, and the top 7 teams in the Pacific division based on points total qualified for the 2023 Calder Cup playoffs. The Calgary Wranglers won the regular season title in their season finale.

=== Eastern Conference ===
==== Atlantic Division ====
1. Providence Bruins – 98 points (.681)
2. Hershey Bears – 97 points (.674)
3. Charlotte Checkers – 86 points (.597)
4. Springfield Thunderbirds – 84 points (.583)
5. Hartford Wolf Pack – 81 points (.563)
6. Lehigh Valley Phantoms – 80 points (.556)

==== North Division ====
1. Toronto Marlies – 90 points (.625)
2. Syracuse Crunch – 81 points (.563), 27 RWs
3. Rochester Americans – 81 points (.563), 25 RWs
4. Utica Comets – 80 points (.556)
5. Laval Rocket – 76 points (.528)

=== Western Conference ===
==== Central Division ====
1. Texas Stars – 92 points (.639)
2. Milwaukee Admirals – 89 points (.618)
3. Manitoba Moose – 84 points (.583)
4. Iowa Wild – 79 points (.549), 24 RWs
5. Rockford IceHogs – 79 points (.549), 20 RWs

==== Pacific Division ====
1. Calgary Wranglers – 106 points (.736)
2. Coachella Valley Firebirds – 103 points (.715)
3. Colorado Eagles – 90 points (.625)
4. Abbotsford Canucks – 87 points (.604)
5. Bakersfield Condors – 78 points (.542)
6. Ontario Reign – 74 points (.514)
7. Tucson Roadrunners – 69 points (.479), 25 RWs

== Bracket ==
First round April 18–23
A4	Springfield	0
A5	Hartford	2
A3	Charlotte	2
A6	Lehigh Valley	1
N4	Utica	2
N5	Laval	0
C4	Iowa	0
C5	Rockford	2
P4	Abbotsford	2
P5	Bakersfield	0
P2	Coachella Valley	2
P7	Tucson	1
P3	Colorado	2
P6	Ontario	0

Division semifinals April 21 – May 6
A1	Providence	1
A5	Hartford	3
Atlantic Division
A2	Hershey	3
A3	Charlotte	1
N1	Toronto	3
N4	Utica	1
North Division
N2	Syracuse	2
N3	Rochester	3
C1	Texas	3
C5	Rockford	0
Central Division
C2	Milwaukee	3
C3	Manitoba	2
P1	Calgary	3
P4	Abbotsford	1
Pacific Division
P2	Coachella Valley	3
P3	Colorado	2

Division finals May 11–21
A5	Hartford	0
A2	Hershey	3
Eastern Conference
N1	Toronto	0
N3	Rochester	3
C1	Texas	2
C2	Milwaukee	3
Western Conference
P1	Calgary	2
P2	Coachella Valley	3

Conference finals May 23 – June 5
A2	Hershey	4
N3	Rochester	2
C2	Milwaukee	2
P2	Coachella Valley	4

Calder Cup finals June 8–21
A2	Hershey	4
P2	Coachella Valley	3

== First round ==
=== Eastern Conference ===
==== (A3) Charlotte Checkers vs. (A6) Lehigh Valley Phantoms ====
April 18	Lehigh Valley Phantoms	4–3	Charlotte Checkers	Bojangles Coliseum	Recap
Adam Brooks (1) - 12:54		First period	08:28 - Lucas Carlsson (1)
Tyson Foerster (1) - 0:49; Cooper Marody (1) - 01:02; Tyson Foerster (2) - 04:46		Second period	No scoring
No scoring		Third period	09:40 - pp - Riley Nash (1); 10:18 - Santtu Kinnunen (1)
Samuel Ersson ( 28 saves / 31 shots )		Goalie stats	Mack Guzda ( 13 saves / 17 shots ) Jean-Francois Berube ( 8 saves / 8 shots )

April 20	Lehigh Valley Phantoms	4–5	2OT	Charlotte Checkers	Bojangles Coliseum	Recap
Artem Anisimov (1) - 19:17		First period		04:44 - pp - Justin Sourdif (1); 06:06 - Calle Sjalin (1)
No scoring		Second period		No scoring
Olle Lycksell (1) - 00:40; Olle Lycksell (2) - 12:03; Elliot Desnoyers (1) - 13:35		Third period		06:46 - pp - Cory Conacher (1); 09:23 - Connor Bunnaman (1)
No scoring		Second overtime period		18:48 - Lucas Carlsson (2)
Samuel Ersson ( 45 saves / 50 shots )		Goalie stats		Mack Guzda ( 38 saves / 42 shots )

April 21	Lehigh Valley Phantoms	0–6	Charlotte Checkers	Bojangles Coliseum	Recap
No scoring		First period	No scoring
No scoring		Second period	03:04 - Patrick Giles (1); 06:54 - Riley Nash (2); 10:52- Dominic Franco (1); 15:12 - Henry Bowlby (1); 18:08 - pp - Cameron Morrison (1)
No scoring		Third period	08:47 - sh - Connor Bunnaman (2)
Samuel Ersson ( 11 saves / 15 shots ) Nolan Maier ( 9 saves / 11 shots )		Goalie stats	Jean-Francois Berube ( 31 saves / 31 shots )

Charlotte won series 2–1

==== (A4) Springfield Thunderbirds vs. (A5) Hartford Wolf Pack ====
April 19	Hartford Wolf Pack	6–1	Springfield Thunderbirds	MassMutual Center	Recap
Lauri Pajuniemi (1) - 03:37		First period	No scoring
Zac Jones (1) - 06:02; Lauri Pajuniemi (2) - 10:43; Blake Hillman (1) - 19:54		Second period	No scoring
Ryan Carpenter (1) - 03:42; Ty Emberson (1) - en - 18:38		Third period	11:41 - pp - Adam Gaudette (1)
Dylan Garand ( 24 saves / 25 shots )		Goalie stats	Joel Hofer ( 30 saves / 35 shots )

April 21	Springfield Thunderbirds	1–7	Hartford Wolf Pack	XL Center	Recap
William Bitten (1) - 19:33		First period	08:03 - Tanner Fritz (1); 10:48 - Wyatt Kalynuk (1); 12:50 - pp - Ty Emberson (2)
No scoring		Second period	03:57 - pp - Bobby Trivigno (1); 06:30 - Blake Hillman (2)
No scoring		Third period	13:34 - en, sh - Anton Blidh (1); 15:02 - en - Tim Gettinger (1)
Joel Hofer ( 28 saves / 33 shots )		Goalie stats	Dylan Garand ( 19 saves / 20 shots )

Hartford won series 2–0

==== (N4) Utica Comets vs. (N5) Laval Rocket ====
April 19	Utica Comets	4–0	Laval Rocket	Place Bell	Recap
Reilly Walsh (1) - 12:21		First period	No scoring
Aarne Talvitie (1) - 03:11; Ryan Schmelzer (1) - 18:49		Second period	No scoring
Ryan Schmelzer (2) - en - 18:53		Third period	No scoring
Nico Daws ( 33 saves / 33 shots )		Goalie stats	Cayden Primeau ( 20 saves / 23 shots )

April 21	Laval Rocket	1–2	OT	Utica Comets	Adirondack Bank Center	Recap
No scoring		First period		No scoring
Frederic Allard (1) - 07:01		Second period		No scoring
No scoring		Third period		19:58 - Reilly Walsh (2)
No scoring		First overtime period		02:45 - Samuel Laberge (1)
Cayden Primeau ( 32 saves / 34 shots )		Goalie stats		Nico Daws ( 25 saves / 26 shots )

Utica won series 2–0

=== Western Conference ===
==== (C4) Iowa Wild vs. (C5) Rockford IceHogs ====
April 19	Iowa Wild	2–3	OT	Rockford IceHogs	BMO Center	Recap
03:26 - Mitchell Balmas (1)		First period		Dave Gust (1) - 03:44; Brett Seney (1) - 17:55
04:14 - pp - Steven Fogarty (1)		Second period		No scoring
No scoring		Third period		No scoring
No scoring		First overtime period		Rocco Grimaldi (1) - 03:59
Jesper Wallstedt ( 28 saves / 31 shots )		Goalie stats		Arvid Soderblom ( 28 saves / 31 shots )

April 21	Rockford IceHogs	4–3	OT	Iowa Wild	Wells Fargo Arena	Recap
Isaak Phillips (1) - pp - 17:27		First period		05:49 - Damien Giroux (1)
Dave Gust (2) - 16:10		Second period		No scoring
Michal Teply (1) - 09:34		Third period		00:20 - pp - Marco Rossi (1); 05:53 - Adam Beckman (1)
Buddy Robinson (1) - 02:05		First overtime period		No scoring
Arvid Soderblom ( 26 saves / 29 shots )		Goalie stats		Jesper Wallstedt ( 33 saves / 37 shots )

Rockford won series 2–0

==== (P2) Coachella Valley Firebirds vs. (P7) Tucson Roadrunners ====
April 19	Tucson Roadrunners	1–5	Coachella Valley Firebirds	Acrisure Arena	Recap
No scoring		First period	01:00 - pp - Max McCormick (1); 07:49 - Alexander True (1); 09:26 - Kole Lind (1)
No scoring		Second period	08:03 - pp - Max McCormick (2)
Vladislav Kolyachonok (1) - 18:43		Third period	16:19 - en - Carsen Twarynski (1)
Ivan Prosvetov ( 22 saves / 26 shots )		Goalie stats	Joey Daccord ( 45 saves / 46 shots )

April 21	Tucson Roadrunners	4–3	Coachella Valley Firebirds	Acrisure Arena	Recap
Colin Theisen (1) - 06:54; Michael Carcone (1) - pp - 10:21; Milos Kelemen (1) - 15:07		First period	No scoring
Michael Carcone (2) - 02:43		Second period	01:42 - pp - Jimmy Schuldt (1)
No scoring		Third period	10:01 - pp - Tye Kartye (1); 17:23 - Jeremy McKenna (1)
Ivan Prosvetov ( 34 saves / 37 shots )		Goalie stats	Joey Daccord ( 22 saves / 26 shots )

April 23	Tucson Roadrunners	1–5	Coachella Valley Firebirds	Acrisure Arena	Recap
No scoring		First period	03:49 - Ville Petman (1); 05:56 - Shane Wright (1); 06:25 - Kole Lind (2); 07:22 - Tye Kartye (2)
No scoring		Second period	No scoring
Michael Carcone (3) - 17:32		Third period	10:52 - en - Kole Lind (3)
Ivan Prosvetov ( 3 saves / 7 shots ) Tyler Parks ( 24 save / 24 shots )		Goalie stats	Joey Daccord ( 31 saves / 32 shots )

Coachella Valley won series 2–1

==== (P3) Colorado Eagles vs. (P6) Ontario Reign ====
April 19	Ontario Reign	2–3	OT	Colorado Eagles	Budweiser Events Center	Recap
No scoring		First period		No scoring
Nate Thompson (1) - 01:57; Tyrell Goulbourne (1) - 10:16		Second period		05:43 - Charles Hudon (1)
No scoring		Third period		03:52 - Cedric Pare (1)
No scoring		First overtime period		06:08 - Gustav Rydahl (1)
Cal Petersen ( 18 saves / 21 shots )		Goalie stats		Justus Annunen ( 30 saves / 32 shots )

April 21	Ontario Reign	4–6	Colorado Eagles	Budweiser Events Center	Recap
Lias Andersson (1) - 02:20		First period	04:16 - Kale Kessy (1)
No scoring		Second period	11:04 - Oskar Olausson (1); 16:03 - Ryan Wagner (1)
Aidan Dudas (1) - 09:09; Nate Thompson (2) - 18:06; Lias Andersson (2) - 18:34		Third period	07:24 - pp - Charles Hudon (2); 10:01 - pp - Cedric Pare (2); 19:53 - en - Cedric Paré (3)
Cal Petersen ( 20 saves / 25 shots )		Goalie stats	Justus Annunen ( 30 saves / 34 shots )

Colorado won series 2–0

==== (P4) Abbotsford Canucks vs. (P5) Bakersfield Condors ====
April 19	Bakersfield Condors	0–3	Abbotsford Canucks	Abbotsford Centre	Recap
No scoring		First period	No scoring
No scoring		Second period	Max Sasson (1) - 01:28; Max Sasson (2) - 04:58
No scoring		Third period	Jack Rathbone (1) - 14:28
Calvin Pickard ( 27 saves / 30 shots )		Goalie stats	Spencer Martin ( 21 saves / 21 shots )

April 21	Bakersfield Condors	2–4	Abbotsford Canucks	Abbotsford Centre	Recap
No scoring		First period	No scoring
James Hamblin (1) - pp - 18:26		Second period	02:06 - Jack Rathbone (2); 13:16 - Brady Keeper (1)
Raphael Lavoie (1) - 03:30		Third period	07:36 - pp - Nils Hoglander (2); 19:05 - en - John Stevens (1)
Calvin Pickard ( 29 saves / 32 shots )		Goalie stats	Arturs Silovs ( 26 saves / 28 shots )

Abbotsford won series 2–0

== Division semifinals ==
=== Eastern Conference ===
==== (A1) Providence Bruins vs. (A5) Hartford Wolf Pack ====
April 28	Hartford Wolf Pack	1–0	Providence Bruins	Amica Mutual Pavilion	Recap
No scoring		First period	No scoring
Bobby Trivigno (2) - 15:23		Second period	No scoring
No scoring		Third period	No scoring
Dylan Garand ( 14 saves / 14 shots )		Goalie stats	Brandon Bussi ( 31 saves / 32 shots )

April 29	Hartford Wolf Pack	2–1	Providence Bruins	Amica Mutual Pavilion	Recap
No scoring		First period	No scoring
Anton Blidh (2) - 06:17; Adam Clendening (1) - 09:43		Second period	13:14 - Luke Toporowski (1)
No scoring		Third period	No scoring
Dylan Garand ( 29 saves / 30 shots )		Goalie stats	Brandon Bussi ( 26 saves / 28 shots )

May 3	Providence Bruins	6–3	Hartford Wolf Pack	XL Center	Recap
Justin Brazeau (1) - pp - 15:54; Oskar Steen (1) - 19:59		First period	No scoring
Luke Toporowski (2) - pp - 14:03		Second period	19:35 - pp - Zac Jones (2)
Jack Ahcan (1) - 05:58; Justin Brazeau (2) - en - 18:28; Vinni Lettieri (1) - en - 19:52		Third period	02:18 - sh - Tim Gettinger (2); 13:34 - Lauri Pajuniemi (3)
Brandon Bussi ( 28 saves / 31 shots )		Goalie stats	Dylan Garand ( 26 saves / 30 shots )

May 5	Providence Bruins	0–4	Hartford Wolf Pack	XL Center	Recap
No scoring		First period	3:40 - Turner Elson (1)
No scoring		Second period	4:49 - Jake Leschyshyn (1); 15:23 - Ryan Carpenter (2)
No scoring		Third period	12:18 - en - Jake Leschyshyn (2)
Brandon Bussi ( 28 saves / 31 shots )		Goalie stats	Dylan Garand ( 32 saves / 32 shots )

Hartford won series 3–1

==== (A2) Hershey Bears vs. (A3) Charlotte Checkers ====
April 28	Hershey Bears	5–2	Charlotte Checkers	Bojangles Coliseum	Recap
Mike Vecchione (1) - 14:12; Aliaksei Protas (1) - 16:43		First period	No scoring
Hendrix Lapierre (1) - 02:06; Connor McMichael (1) - 04:03		Second period	05:42 - pp - Lucas Carlsson (3)
Michael Sgarbossa (1) - pp, en - 19:54		Third period	08:52 - Santtu Kinnunen (2)
Hunter Shepard ( 22 saves / 24 shots )		Goalie stats	Mack Guzda ( 4 saves / 7 shots ) Jean-Francois Berube ( 16 saves / 17 shots )

April 29	Hershey Bears	5–1	Charlotte Checkers	Bojangles Coliseum	Recap
No scoring		First period	No scoring
Joe Snively (1) - pp - 06:46; Mason Morelli (1) - 14:55		Second period	No scoring
Connor McMichael (2) - 09:50; Sam Anas (1) - 10:13; Garrett Pilon (1) - en - 14:30		Third period	09:15 - Ryan McAllister (1)
Hunter Shepard ( 19 saves / 20 shots )		Goalie stats	Jean-Francois Berube ( 11 saves / 15 shots )

May 3	Charlotte Checkers	2–1	Hershey Bears	Giant Center	Recap
No scoring		First period	No scoring
Cory Conacher (2) - 13:24; Aleksi Heponiemi (1) - 17:53		Second period	02:07 - Sam Anas (2)
No scoring		Third period	No scoring
Mack Guzda ( 21 saves / 22 shots )		Goalie stats	Hunter Shepard ( 18 saves / 20 shots )

May 4	Charlotte Checkers	2–6	Hershey Bears	Giant Center	Recap
Jake Wise (1) - 2:00; Riley Nash (3) - 7:54		First period	No scoring
No scoring		Second period	10:15 - Mason Morelli (2); 19:44 - Beck Malenstyn (1)
No scoring		Third period	8:59 - pp - Aliaksei Protas (2); 10:57 - Aliaksei Protas (3); 17:49 - en - Riley Sutter (1); 19:00 - en - Dylan McIlrath (1)
Mack Guzda ( 17 saves / 21 shots ) Jean-Francois Berube ( 9 saves / 9 shots )		Goalie stats	Hunter Shepard ( 26 saves / 28 shots )

Hershey won series 3–1

==== (N1) Toronto Marlies vs. (N4) Utica Comets ====
April 27	Utica Comets	5–6	OT	Toronto Marlies	Coca-Cola Coliseum	Recap
Reilly Walsh (3) – pp – 06:08; Graeme Clarke (1) - 13:39		First period		No scoring
Xavier Parent (1) - 02:06		Second period		05:43 - Pontus Holmberg (1); 07:00 - Topi Niemela (1); 13:59 - pp - Logan Shaw (1)
Reilly Walsh (4) - 11:08; Alexander Holtz (1) - 19:08		Third period		11:43 - Logan Shaw (2); 12:41 - Semyon Der-Arguchintsev (1)
No scoring		First overtime period		18:35 - Joseph Blandisi (1)
Nico Daws ( 43 saves / 49 shots )		Goalie stats		Keith Petruzzelli ( 40 saves / 45 shots )

April 29	Utica Comets	7–2	Toronto Marlies	Coca-Cola Coliseum	Recap
Brian Halonen (1) - 01:46; Aarne Talvitie (2) - 12:40		First period	13:42 - pp - Semyon Der-Arguchintsev (2); 15:09 - pp - Kyle Clifford (1)
Nolan Stevens (1) - 06:56; Ryan Schmelzer (3) - 13:25; Xavier Parent (2) - 14:10		Second period	No scoring
Graeme Clarke (2) - pp - 05:36; Brian Pinho (2) - 09:00		Third period	No scoring
Nico Daws ( 28 saves / 30 shots )		Goalie stats	Keith Petruzzelli ( 19 saves / 26 shots ) Dennis Hildeby ( 2 saves / 2 shots )

May 3	Toronto Marlies	5–2	Utica Comets	Adirondack Bank Center	Recap
Ryan Chyzowski (1) - 04:57		First period	No scoring
Kyle Clifford (2) - ps - 05:01		Second period	05:33 - Aarne Talvitie (3); 17:52 - Simon Nemec (1)
Ryan Chyzowski (2) - 04:34; Pontus Holmberg (2) - 16:12; Logan Shaw (3) - sh, en - 18:40		Third period	No scoring
Erik Kallgren ( 24 saves / 26 shots )		Goalie stats	Nico Daws ( 23 saves / 27 shots )

May 5	Toronto Marlies	4–1	Utica Comets	Adirondack Bank Center	Recap
No scoring		First period	10:15 - Xavier Parent (3)
Carl Dahlstrom (1) - 5:04; Matteo Pietroniro (1) - 10:31; Logan Shaw (4) - 11:10		Second period	No scoring
Kyle Clifford (3) - en - 19:58		Third period	No scoring
Erick Kallgren ( 28 saves / 29 shots )		Goalie stats	Nico Daws ( 33 saves / 36 shots )

Toronto won series 3–1

==== (N2) Syracuse Crunch vs. (N3) Rochester Americans ====
April 21	Rochester Americans	2–3	OT	Syracuse Crunch	Upstate Medical University Arena	Recap
No scoring		First period		No scoring
Linus Weissbach (1) - 08:54; Josh Passolt (1) - 16:30		Second period		04:12 - pp - Declan Carlile (1); 16:30 - pp - Felix Robert (1)
No scoring		Third period		No scoring
No scoring		First overtime period		02:20 - Philippe Myers (1)
Malcolm Subban ( 37 saves / 40 shots )		Goalie stats		Maxime Legace ( 21 saves / 23 shots )

April 22	Rochester Americans	0–3	Syracuse Crunch	Upstate Medical University Arena	Recap
No scoring		First period	01:52 - Ryan Jones (1); 11:29 - Gage Goncalves (1)
No scoring		Second period	No scoring
No scoring		Third period	19:27 - en - Gage Goncalves (2)
Malcolm Subban ( 29 saves / 31 shots )		Goalie stats	Maxime Legace ( 18 saves / 18 shots )

April 28	Syracuse Crunch	5–8	Rochester Americans	Blue Cross Arena	Recap
Simon Ryfors (1) - 06:28		First period	05:31 - pp - Isak Rosen (1); 17:39 - Michael Mersch (1)
Gage Goncalves (3) - 07:29		Second period	18:55 - Sean Malone (1)
Simon Ryfors (2) - 05:25; Alex Barre-Boulet (1) - pp - 07:38; Simon Ryfors (3) - 17:27		Third period	04:22 - sh - Mason Jobst (1); 15:21 - pp - Jiri Kulich (1); 16:07 - pp - Michael Mersch (2); 18:41 - en - Brett Murray (1); 19:24 - en - Michael Mersch (3)
Maxime Legace ( 19 saves / 25 shots )		Goalie stats	Malcolm Subban ( 23 saves / 28 shots )

April 30	Syracuse Crunch	0–4	Rochester Americans	Blue Cross Arena	Recap
No scoring		First period	03:38 - pp - Jiri Kulich (2)
No scoring		Second period	No scoring
No scoring		Third period	03:06 - Lawrence Pilut (1); 14:50 - Mason Jobst (2); 16:11 - en - Tyson Kozak (1)
Maxime Lagace ( 22 saves / 25 shots )		Goalie stats	Malcolm Subban ( 31 saves / 31 shots )

May 6	Rochester Americans	5–4	OT	Syracuse Crunch	Upstate Medical University Arena	Recap
Tyson Kozak (2) - 11:08		First period		No scoring
Lawrence Pilut (2) - 09:46; Jiri Kulich (3) - 13:59; Michael Mersch (4) - 14:59		Second period		14:14 - Declan Carlile (2); 19:46 - Simon Ryfors (4)
No scoring		Third period		09:36 - Gabriel Dumont (1); 19:30 - Trevor Carrick (1)
Lawrence Pilut (3) - pp - 11:35		First overtime period		No scoring
Malcolm Subban ( 44 saves / 48 shots )		Goalie stats		Maxime Lagace ( 11 saves / 15 shots ) Hugo Alnefelt ( 9 saves / 10 shots )

Rochester won series 3–2

=== Western Conference ===
==== (C1) Texas Stars vs. (C5) Rockford IceHogs ====
April 28	Texas Stars	5–3	Rockford IceHogs	BMO Center	Recap
Rhett Gardner (1) - 12:34		First period	19:58 - pp - Joey Anderson (1)
Marian Studenic (1) - 14:33		Second period	01:16 - D. J. Busdeker (1)
Scott Reedy (1) - pp - 07:16; Nick Caamano (1) - 16:22; Marian Studenic (2) - en - 19:00		Third period	02:57 - Bobby Lynch (1)
Matt Murray ( 25 saves / 28 shots )		Goalie stats	Arvid Soderblom ( 35 saves / 39 shots )

April 30	Texas Stars	4–1	Rockford IceHogs	BMO Center	Recap
Curtis McKenzie (1) - 08:08		First period	No scoring
Riley Barber (1) - 11:39		Second period	No scoring
Riley Barber (2) - 16:32; Tanner Kero - en - 19:33		Third period	05:54 - Joey Anderson (2)
Matt Murray ( 26 saves / 27 shots )		Goalie stats	Arvid Soderblom ( 25 saves / 28 shots )

May 3	Rockford IceHogs	2–4	Texas Stars	H-E-B Center at Cedar Park	Recap
Michal Teply (2) - pp - 07:11		First period	02:16 - Riley Damiani (1); 12:01 - Nick Caamano (2)
No scoring		Second period	No scoring
Lukas Reichel (1) - 19:44		Third period	04:57 - Oskari Laaksonen (1); 17:14 - pp - Rhett Gardner (2)
Arvid Soderblom ( 22 saves / 26 shots )		Goalie stats	Matt Murray ( 27 saves / 29 shots )

Texas won series 3–0

==== (C2) Milwaukee Admirals vs. (C3) Manitoba Moose ====
April 28	Milwaukee Admirals	6–2	Manitoba Moose	Canada Life Centre	Recap
Marc Del Gaizo (1) - 01:35; Zach Sanford (1) - pp - 07:24; Jimmy Huntington (1) - 08:19		First period	No scoring
Jordan Gross (1) - pp - 05:55; Austin Rueschhoff (1) - 07:58; Jordan Gross (2) - 10:03		Second period	03:19 - Jansen Harkins (1); 19:15 - Daniel Torgersson (1)
No scoring		Third period	No scoring
Yaroslav Askarov ( 35 saves / 37 shots )		Goalie stats	Arvid Holm ( 14 saves / 17 shots ) Evan Cormier ( 4 saves / 7 shots )

April 30	Milwaukee Admirals	2–3	OT	Manitoba Moose	Canada Life Centre	Recap
No scoring		First period		16:53 - Nicholas Jones (1)
Kiefer Sherwood (1) - pp - 05:48		Second period		No scoring
Luke Evangelista (1) - 13:03		Third period		19:07 - Cole Maier (1)
No scoring		First overtime period		01:32 - Jansen Harkins (2)
Yaroslav Askarov ( 31 saves / 34 shots )		Goalie stats		Oskari Salminen ( 30 saves / 32 shots )

May 3	Manitoba Moose	3–2	OT	Milwaukee Admirals	UW–Milwaukee Panther Arena	Recap
Alex Limoges (1) - 02:49		First period		16:06 - Luke Evangelista (2)
Jeff Malott (1) - 09:57		Second period		No scoring
No scoring		Third period		06:10 - Kevin Gravel (1)
Wyatt Bongiovanni (1) - pp - 04:53		First overtime period		No scoring
Oskari Salminen ( 24 saves / 26 shots )		Goalie stats		Yaroslav Askarov ( 27 saves / 30 shots )

May 5	Manitoba Moose	3–5	Milwaukee Admirals	UW–Milwaukee Panther Arena	Recap
Greg Meireles (1) - pp - 5:02		First period	8:13 - pp - Zach Sanford (2); 18:45 - en - Adam Wilsby (1)
No scoring		Second period	2:15 - pp - Joakim Kemell (1); 15:49 - Kiefer Sherwood (2)
Jansen Harkins (3) - pp - 2:37; Wyatt Bongiovanni (2) - 4:43		Third period	19:41 - en - Austin Rueschhoff (2)
Oskari Salminen ( 23 saves / 26 shots )		Goalie stats	Yaroslav Askarov ( 16 saves / 19 shots )

May 6	Manitoba Moose	1–2	Milwaukee Admirals	UW–Milwaukee Panther Arena	Recap
No scoring		First period	No scoring
No scoring		Second period	11:24 - Mark Jankowski (1)
Jansen Harkins (4) - 18:03		Third period	19:33 - Spencer Stastney (1)
Oskari Salminen ( 31 saves / 32 shots )		Goalie stats	Yaroslav Askarov ( 20 saves / 21 shots )

Milwaukee won series 3–2

==== (P1) Calgary Wranglers vs. (P4) Abbotsford Canucks ====
April 26	Abbotsford Canucks	2–3	OT	Calgary Wranglers	Scotiabank Saddledome	Recap
No scoring		First period		13:19 - Dryden Hunt (1)
No scoring		Second period		No scoring
Marc Gatcomb (1) - 01:35; Aatu Raty (1) - 15:10		Third period		08:49 - Adam Klapka (1)
No scoring		First overtime period		11:52 - Jakob Pelletier (1)
Spencer Martin ( 37 saves / 40 shots )		Goalie stats		Dustin Wolf ( 37 saves / 39 shots )

April 28	Abbotsford Canucks	3–4	OT	Calgary Wranglers	Scotiabank Saddledome	Recap
Arshdeep Bains (1) - sh - 18:30; Arshdeep Bains (2) - sh - 19:25		First period		09:54 - Clark Bishop (1)
Tristen Nielsen (1) - 16:22		Second period		No scoring
No scoring		Third period		00:37 - Ben Jones (1); 05:48 - pp - Dryden Hunt (2)
No scoring		First overtime period		07:49 - pp - Matthew Phillips
Arturs Silovs - ( 38 saves / 42 shots )		Goalie stats		Dustin Wolf - ( 24 saves / 27 shots )

May 3	Calgary Wranglers	2–3	Abbotsford Canucks	Abbotsford Centre	Recap
Jeremie Poirier (1) - 04:37		First period	09:58 - pp - Linus Karlsson (1)
No scoring		Second period	04:44 - Christian Wolanin (1)
Nick DeSimone (1) - 09:15		Third period	01:10 - Kyle Rau (1)
Dustin Wolf ( 27 saves / 30 shots )		Goalie stats	Spencer Martin ( 25 saves / 27 shots )

May 5	Calgary Wranglers	3–2	Abbotsford Canucks	Abbotsford Centre	Recap
Cole Schwindt (1) - pp - 12:51		First period	2:18 - Nils Hoglander (3)
No scoring		Second period	15:33 - Tristen Nielsen (2)
Ilya Solovyov (1) - 8:29; Adam Klapka (2) - 12:41		Third period	No scoring
Dustin Wolf ( 23 saves / 25 shots )		Goalie stats	Spencer Martin ( 21 saves / 24 shots )

Calgary won series 3–1

==== (P2) Coachella Valley Firebirds vs. (P3) Colorado Eagles ====
April 26	Coachella Valley Firebirds	6–2	Colorado Eagles	Budweiser Events Center	Recap
Eddie Wittchow (1) - 11:09; Jimmy Schuldt (2) - pp - 16:05		First period	08:44 - Mikhail Maltsev (1)
Eddie Wittchow (2) - 06:38; Max McCormick (3) - 15:31		Second period	No scoring
Alexander True (2) - 06:27; Carsen Twarynski (2) - 08:58		Third period	05:32 - Mikhail Maltsev (2)
Joey Daccord ( 25 saves / 27 shots )		Goalie stats	Justus Annunen ( 33 saves / 39 shots )

April 27	Coachella Valley Firebirds	2–3	Colorado Eagles	Budweiser Events Center	Recap
Ryker Evans (1) - pp - 15:48		First period	14:34 - sh - Cedric Pare (4)
Luke Henman (1) - 13:21		Second period	19:57 - Josh Jacobs (1)
No scoring		Third period	16:00 - Mikhail Maltsev (3)
Joey Daccord ( 35 saves / 38 shots )		Goalie stats	Jonas Johansson ( 21 saves / 23 shots )

April 30	Colorado Eagles	1–0	OT	Coachella Valley Firebirds	Acrisure Arena	Recap
No scoring		First period		No scoring
No scoring		Second period		No scoring
No scoring		Third period		No scoring
Keaton Middleton (1) - 01:40		First overtime period		No scoring
Jonas Johansson ( 29 saves / 29 shots )		Goalie stats		Joey Daccord ( 24 saves / 25 shots )

May 3	Colorado Eagles	3–4	Coachella Valley Firebirds	Acrisure Arena	Recap
Ryan Wagner (2) - 09:31		First period	03:31 - Alexander True (3); 06:36 - Ville Petman (2)
Charles Hudon (3) - 02:05		Second period	13:52 - pp - Kole Lind (4)
Charles Hudon (4) - pp - 02:10		Third period	17:28 - sh - Alexander True (4)
Jonas Johansson ( 17 saves / 21 shots )		Goalie stats	Joey Daccord ( 28 saves / 31 shots )

May 5	Colorado Eagles	0–5	Coachella Valley Firebirds	Acrisure Arena	Recap
No scoring		First period	6:03 - Jeremy McKenna (2); 6:50 - sh - Max McCormick (4); 19:09 - Jimmy Schuldt (3)
No scoring		Second period	2:28 - pp - Max McCormick (5)
No scoring		Third period	2:15 - Jeremy McKenna (3)
Jonas Johansson ( 18 saves / 23 shots )		Goalie stats	Joey Daccord ( 33 saves / 33 shots )

Coachella Valley won series 3–2

== Division finals ==
=== Eastern Conference ===
==== (A2) Hershey Bears vs. (A5) Hartford Wolf Pack ====
May 11	Hartford Wolf Pack	2–3	OT	Hershey Bears	Giant Center	Recap
Lauri Pajuniemi (4) - pp - 06:55		First period		No scoring
Jonny Brodzinski (1) - pp - 02:33		Second period		No scoring
No scoring		Third period		02:52 - pp - Logan Day (1); 17:51 - Connor McMichael (3)
No scoring		First overtime period		04:41 - Henrik Borgstrom (1)
Dylan Garand ( 32 saves / 35 shots )		Goalie stats		Hunter Shepard ( 25 saves / 27 shots )

May 13	Hartford Wolf Pack	2–4	Hershey Bears	Giant Center	Recap
Will Cuylle (1) - pp - 11:32		First period	3:12 - pp - Mason Morelli (3); 12:44 - Beck Malenstyn (2)
No scoring		Second period	08:48 - Mike Vecchione (2)
Adam Clendening (2) - 15:09		Third period	13:14 - Hendrix Lapierre (2)
Dylan Garand ( 26 saves / 30 shots )		Goalie stats	Hunter Shepard ( 25 saves / 27 shots )

May 17	Hershey Bears	3–1	Hartford Wolf Pack	XL Center	Recap
No scoring		First period	17:40 - Turner Elson (2)
Vincent Iorio (1) - 15:05		Second period	No scoring
Lucas Johansen (1) - 04:22; Garrett Pilon (2) - 7:25		Third period	No scoring
Hunter Shepard ( 33 saves / 34 shots )		Goalie stats	Louis Domingue ( 13 saves / 16 shots )

Hershey won series 3–0

==== (N1) Toronto Marlies vs. (N3) Rochester Americans ====
May 11	Rochester Americans	4–3	Toronto Marlies	Coca-Cola Coliseum	Recap
Kohen Olischefski (1) - sh - 9:00; Brett Murray (2) - 18:16		First period	3:04 - Nick Abruzzese (1)
Isak Rosen (2) - pp - 18:58		Second period	No scoring
Jiri Kulich (4) - pp - 2:07		Third period	7:56 - Joseph Blandisi (2); 16:19 - Kyle Clifford (4)
Malcolm Subban ( 20 saves / 23 shots )		Goalie stats	Erik Kallgren ( 16 saves / 20 shots )

May 13	Rochester Americans	7–4	Toronto Marlies	Coca-Cola Coliseum	Recap
Jiri Kulich (5) - 9:57		First period	No scoring
Jeremy Davies (1) - 4:28; Lukas Rousek (1) - 5:58; Sean Malone (2) - 7:01; Joseph Cecconi (1) - 7:13		Second period	1:20 - pp - Nick Abruzzese (2); 10:08 - pp - Max Ellis (1)
Michael Mersch (5) - pp - 7:12; Brendan Warren (1) - en - 16:15		Third period	5:03 - pp - Pontus Holmberg (3); 18:22 - pp - Alex Steeves (1)
Malcolm Subban ( 34 saves / 38 shots )		Goalie stats	Erik Kallgren ( 15 saves / 19 shots ) Keith Petruzzelli ( 9 saves / 11 shots )

May 17	Toronto Marlies	4–8	Rochester Americans	Blue Cross Arena	Recap
Pontus Holmberg (4) - 0:17		First period	3:05 - Ethan Prow (1); 6:33 - Kohen Olischefski (2); 9:57 - pp - Lukas Rousek (2)
Pontus Holmberg (5) - pp - 9:09; Pontus Holmberg (6) - 19:01		Second period	6:50 - Jiri Kulich (6); 13:27 - pp - Isak Rosen (3)
Topi Niemela (2) - 13:41		Third period	9:45 - Isak Rosen (4); 16:01 - pp - Brett Murray (3); 19:37 - en - Matt Bartkowski (1)
Joseph Woll ( 28 saves / 35 shots )		Goalie stats	Malcolm Subban ( 34 saves / 38 shots )

Rochester won series 3–0

=== Western Conference ===
==== (C1) Texas Stars vs. (C2) Milwaukee Admirals ====
May 12	Texas Stars	1–2	Milwaukee Admirals	UW–Milwaukee Panther Arena	Recap
Rhett Gardner (3) - 6:30		First period	16:24 - pp - Luke Evangelista (3)
No scoring		Second period	No scoring
No scoring		Third period	4:35 - pp - Joakim Kemell (2)
Matt Murray ( 31 saves / 33 shots )		Goalie stats	Yaroslav Askarov ( 26 saves / 27 shots )

May 13	Texas Stars	5–3	Milwaukee Admirals	UW–Milwaukee Panther Arena	Recap
Curtis McKenzie (2) - 7:23		First period	No scoring
Alex Petrovic (1) - 0:18		Second period	12:55 - pp - Marc Del Gaizo (2)
Oskar Back (1) - sh - 9:13; Mavrik Bourque (1) - pp - 17:30; Rhett Gardner (4) - en - 19:34		Third period	14:28 - Roland McKeown (1); 15:37 - Roland McKeown (2)
Matt Murray ( 34 saves / 37 shots )		Goalie stats	Yaroslav Askarov ( 16 saves / 20 shots )

May 17	Milwaukee Admirals	4–3	Texas Stars	H-E-B Center at Cedar Park	Recap
Isaac Ratcliffe (1) - 14:30		First period	No scoring
Joakim Kemell (3) - 6:42		Second period	5:19 - Ben Gleason (1)
Egor Afanasyev (1) - 13:26; Isaac Ratcliffe (2) - 18:59		Third period	3:46 - Dawson Barteaux (1); 4:12 - Alex Petrovic (2)
Yaroslav Askarov ( 23 saves / 26 shots )		Goalie stats	Matt Murray ( 25 saves / 29 shots )

May 19	Milwaukee Admirals	3–4	2OT	Texas Stars	H-E-B Center at Cedar Park	Recap
Michael McCarron (1) - 6:13; Luke Evangelista (4) - 8:02		First period		16:30 - Alex Petrovic (3)
No scoring		Second period		18:33 - pp - Curtis McKenzie (3); 18:57 - Nick Caamano (3)
Austin Rueschhoff (3) - 13:13		Third period		No scoring
No scoring		Second overtime period		15:10 - Oskar Back (2)
Yaroslav Askarov ( 29 saves / 33 shots )		Goalie stats		Matt Murray ( 42 saves / 45 shots )

May 21	Milwaukee Admirals	5–2	Texas Stars	H-E-B Center at Cedar Park	Recap
Adam Wilsby (2) - 8:12; Marc Del Gaizo (3) - 11:29; Joakim Kemell (4) - pp - 11:57; Joakim Kemell (5) - 19:01		First period	No scoring
No scoring		Second period	1:48 - Riley Damiani (2)
Egor Afanasyev (2) - en - 19:32		Third period	10:30 - sh - Nick Caamano (4)
Yaroslav Askarov ( 37 saves / 39 shots )		Goalie stats	Matt Murray ( 10 saves / 14 shots ) Remi Poirier ( 10 saves / 10 shots )

Milwaukee won series 3–2

==== (P1) Calgary Wranglers vs. (P2) Coachella Valley Firebirds ====
May 11	Coachella Valley Firebirds	6–3	Calgary Wranglers	Scotiabank Saddledome	Recap
Luke Henman (2) - 1:48; Jeremy McKenna (4) - 4:39; Max McCormick (6) - 7:11		First period	5:04 - pp - Jakob Pelletier (2); 8:19 - Dryden Hunt (3)
Kole Lind (5) - pp - 0:35; Carsen Twarynski (3) - 8:24; Kole Lind (6) - pp - 9:11		Second period	6:04 - Adam Klapka (3)
No scoring		Third period	No scoring
Joey Daccord ( 32 saves / 35 shots )		Goalie stats	Dustin Wolf ( 16 saves / 21 shots ) Oscar Dansk ( 7 saves / 8 shots )

May 12	Coachella Valley Firebirds	2–3	Calgary Wranglers	Scotiabank Saddledome	Recap
Kole Lind (7) - 18:45		First period	18:02 - pp - Connor Zary (1)
No scoring		Second period	1:44 - Jakob Pelletier (3)
Gustav Olofsson (1) - 7:59		Third period	3:45 - Brett Sutter (1)
Joey Daccord ( 24 saves / 27 shots )		Goalie stats	Dustin Wolf ( 31 saves / 33 shots )

May 15	Calgary Wranglers	2–3	3OT	Coachella Valley Firebirds	Acrisure Arena	Recap
Adam Klapka (4) - pp - 8:25; Jakob Pelletier (4) - 15:23		First period		No scoring
No scoring		Second period		5:28 - Gustav Olofsson (2)
No scoring		Third period		2:59 - pp - Max McCormick (7)
No scoring		Third overtime period		11:22 - Ryker Evans (2)
Dustin Wolf ( 48 saves / 51 shots )		Goalie stats		Joey Daccord ( 60 saves / 62 shots )

May 17	Calgary Wranglers	1–0	Coachella Valley Firebirds	Acrisure Arena	Recap
No scoring		First period	No scoring
Cole Schwindt (2) - pp - 7:20		Second period	No scoring
No scoring		Third period	No scoring
Dustin Wolf ( 27 saves / 27 shots )		Goalie stats	Joey Daccord ( 31 saves / 32 shots )

May 19	Calgary Wranglers	5–6	OT	Coachella Valley Firebirds	Acrisure Arena	Recap
No scoring		First period		13:28 - Jesper Froden (1)
Kristians Rubins (1) - 2:03; Clark Bishop (2) - 6:09		Second period		2:35 - Ville Petman (3)
Nick DeSimone (2) - 7:14; Jeremie Poirier (2) - 8:24; Cole Schwindt (3) - 13:02		Third period		2:20 - Jeremy McKenna (5); 7:54 - Gustav Olofsson (3); 14:13 - Jeremy McKenna (6)
No scoring		First overtime period		7:00 - Andrew Poturalski (1)
Dustin Wolf ( 35 saves / 41 shots )		Goalie stats		Joey Daccord ( 28 saves / 33 shots )

Coachella Valley won series 3–2

== Conference finals ==
=== Eastern Conference ===
==== (A2) Hershey Bears vs. (N3) Rochester Americans ====
May 23	Rochester Americans	5–1	Hershey Bears	Giant Center	Recap
Joseph Cecconi (2) - 0:14; Brett Murray (4) - 9:04		First period	No scoring
Matt Bartkowski (2) - 1:42; Mason Jobst (3) - 6:33		Second period	No scoring
Lukas Rousek (3) - en - 18:59		Third period	9:42 - Aaron Ness (1)
Malcolm Subban ( 21 saves / 22 shots )		Goalie stats	Hunter Shepard ( 12 saves / 16 shots ) Zachary Fucale ( 6 saves / 6 shots )

May 25	Rochester Americans	0–2	Hershey Bears	Giant Center	Recap
No scoring		First period	No scoring
No scoring		Second period	16:05 - pp - Henrik Borgstrom (2); 19:28 - Beck Malenstyn (3)
No scoring		Third period	No scoring
Malcolm Subban ( 19 saves / 21 shots )		Goalie stats	Hunter Shepard ( 24 saves / 24 shots )

May 27	Hershey Bears	4–2	Rochester Americans	Blue Cross Arena	Recap
Logan Day (2) - 11:50		First period	No scoring
Sam Anas (3) - pp - 5:36; Connor McMichael (4) - 10:27		Second period	7:57 - Zach Metsa (1)
Aliaksei Protas (4) - en - 19:17		Third period	7:36 - Sean Malone (3)
Hunter Shepard ( 31 saves / 33 shots )		Goalie stats	Malcolm Subban ( 21 saves / 24 shots )

May 29	Hershey Bears	4–2	Rochester Americans	Blue Cross Arena	Recap
No scoring		First period	3:01 - Linus Weissbach (2)
No scoring		Second period	16:01 - Linus Weissbach (3)
Lucas Johansen (2) - 10:06; Logan Day (3) - 12:11; Mason Morelli (4) - 15:27; Mason Morelli (5) - en - 19:03		Third period	No scoring
Hunter Shepard ( 20 saves / 22 shots )		Goalie stats	Malcolm Subban ( 32 saves / 35 shots )

May 31	Rochester Americans	4–1	Hershey Bears	Giant Center	Recap
Jiri Kulich (7) - 4:43		First period	No scoring
No scoring		Second period	No scoring
Lukas Rousek (4) - 1:22; Michael Mersch (6) - pp - 13:11; Lukas Rousek (5) - en - 18:38		Third period	3:44 - pp - Aliaksei Protas (5)
Malcolm Subban ( 32 saves / 33 shots )		Goalie stats	Hunter Shepard ( 23 saves / 26 shots )

June 2	Hershey Bears	1–0	Rochester Americans	Blue Cross Arena	Recap
No scoring		First period	No scoring
Shane Gersich (1) - 12:40		Second period	No scoring
No scoring		Third period	No scoring
Hunter Shepard ( 19 saves / 19 shots )		Goalie stats	Malcolm Subban ( 23 saves / 24 shots )

Hershey won series 4–2

=== Western Conference ===
==== (P2) Coachella Valley Firebirds vs. (C2) Milwaukee Admirals ====
May 25	Milwaukee Admirals	4–6	Coachella Valley Firebirds	Acrisure Arena	Recap
Joakim Kemell (6) - 4:44		First period	4:14 - pp - Tye Kartye (3)
Philip Tomasino (1) - 7:50		Second period	5:38 - sh - Jimmy Schuldt (4)
Michael McCarron (2) - 1:52; Jimmy Huntington (2) - 18:06		Third period	7:22 - Max McCormick (8); 8:09 - Andrew Poturalski (2); 10:54 - Max McCormick (9); 17:44 - en - Max McCormick (10)
Yaroslav Askarov ( 23 saves / 28 shots )		Goalie stats	Joey Daccord ( 18 saves / 22 shots )

May 27	Milwaukee Admirals	3–5	Coachella Valley Firebirds	Acrisure Arena	Recap
Zach Sanford (3) - pp - 5:44		First period	1:01 - Alexander True (5)
No scoring		Second period	1:45 - Jesper Froden (2); 6:25 - Ville Petman (4)
Anthony Angello (1) - 3:53; Egor Afanasyev (3) - 19:46		Third period	17:54 - en - Max McCormick (11); 19:26 - en - Carsen Twarynski (4)
Yaroslav Askarov ( 32 saves / 35 shots )		Goalie stats	Joey Daccord ( 24 saves / 27 shots )

May 29	Coachella Valley Firebirds	1–3	Milwaukee Admirals	UW–Milwaukee Panther Arena	Recap
No scoring		First period	No scoring
Shane Wright (2) - 4:08		Second period	7:13 - Marc Del Gaizo (4); 16:08 - Joakim Kemell (7)
No scoring		Third period	5:39 - Keaton Thompson (1)
Joey Daccord ( 34 saves / 37 shots )		Goalie stats	Devin Cooley ( 28 saves / 29 shots )

June 1	Coachella Valley Firebirds	2–5	Milwaukee Admirals	UW–Milwaukee Panther Arena	Recap
Jimmy Schuldt (5) - 5:13		First period	10:00 - Philip Tomasino (2)
Eddie Wittchow (3) - 2:01		Second period	1:04 - pp - Isaac Ratcliffe (3); 11:25 - pp - Joakim Kemell (8)
No scoring		Third period	0:17 - sh - Michael McCarron (3); 17:18 - en - Egor Afanasyev (4)
Joey Daccord ( 21 saves / 25 shots )		Goalie stats	Devin Cooley ( 30 saves / 32 shots )

June 3	Coachella Valley Firebirds	2–1	Milwaukee Admirals	UW–Milwaukee Panther Arena	Recap
No scoring		First period	12:03 - pp - Kiefer Sherwood (3)
Brogan Rafferty (1) - 1:22; Max McCormick (12) - 16:43		Second period	No scoring
No scoring		Third period	No scoring
Joey Daccord ( 25 saves / 26 shots )		Goalie stats	Devin Cooley ( 23 saves / 25 shots )

June 5	Milwaukee Admirals	3–4	Coachella Valley Firebirds	Acrisure Arena	Recap
No scoring		First period	7:31 - Alexander True (6); 14:19 - Ryker Evans (3)
Michael McCarron (4) - 1:50		Second period	6:00 - Tye Kartye (4)
Egor Afanasyev (5) - 2:28; Kiefer Sherwood (4) - 11:15		Third period	5:20 - pp - Tye Kartye (5)
Devin Cooley ( 17 saves / 21 shots )		Goalie stats	Joey Daccord ( 29 saves / 32 shots )

Coachella Valley won series 4–2

== Calder Cup finals ==
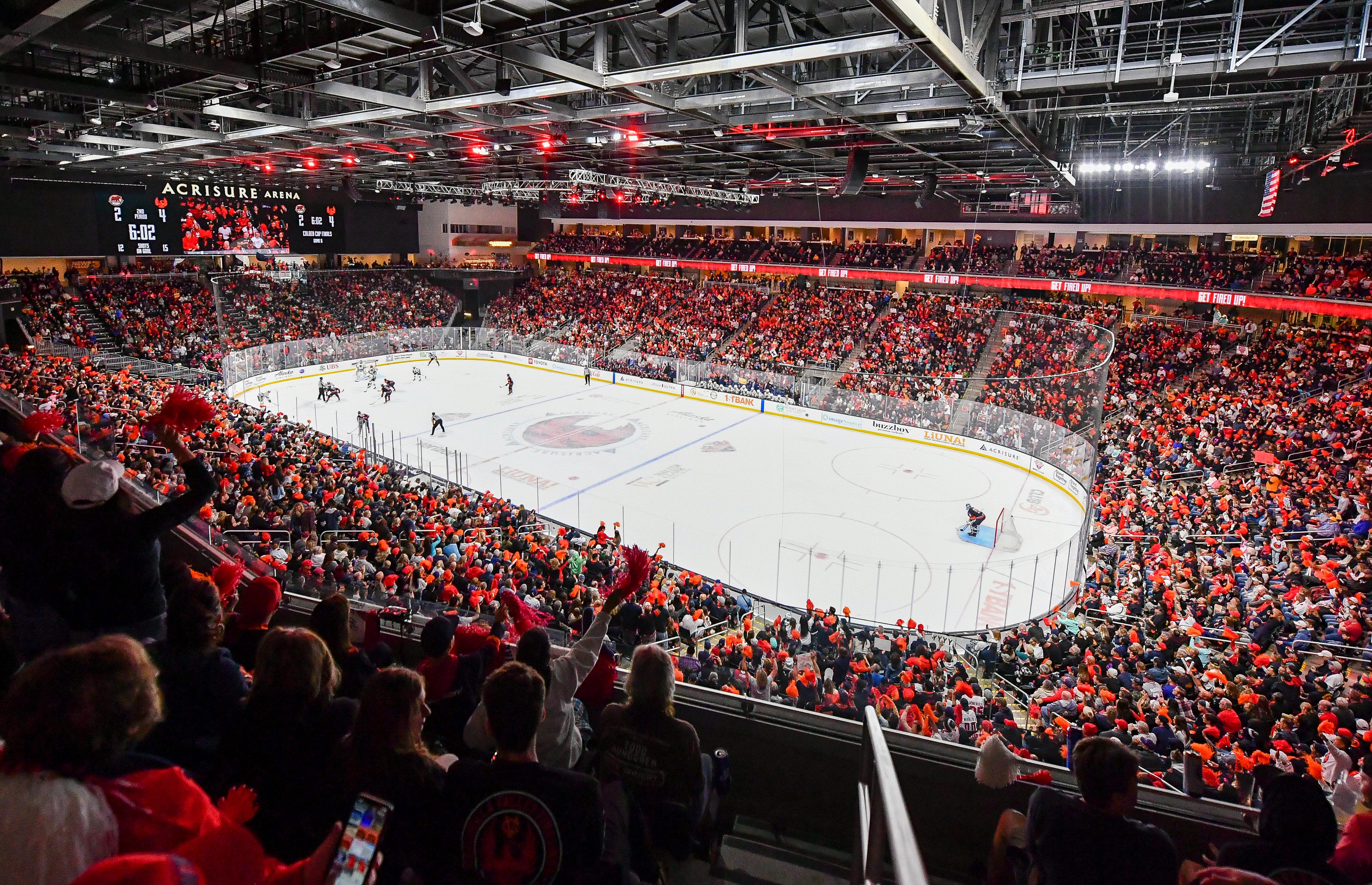
Calder Cup Final Game 6 on June 19, 2023

=== (P2) Coachella Valley Firebirds vs. (A2) Hershey Bears ===
June 8	Hershey Bears	0–5	Coachella Valley Firebirds	Acrisure Arena	Recap
No scoring		First period	9:02 – pp – Tye Kartye (6)
No scoring		Second period	6:54 – Ville Petman (5)
No scoring		Third period	1:59 – Andrew Poturalski (3); 9:30 – Jesper Froden (3); 10:08 – Alexander True (7)
Hunter Shepard (22 saves / 27 shots)		Goalie stats	Joey Daccord (25 saves / 25 shots)

June 10	Hershey Bears	0–4	Coachella Valley Firebirds	Acrisure Arena	Recap
No scoring		First period	No scoring
No scoring		Second period	5:08 – pp – Jesper Froden (4); 6:22 – Austin Poganski (1); 11:55 – Ryker Evans (4); 18:37 – pp – Cameron Hughes (1)
No scoring		Third period	No scoring
Hunter Shepard (19 saves / 23 shots)		Goalie stats	Joey Daccord (33 saves / 33 shots)

June 13	Coachella Valley Firebirds	4–5	OT	Hershey Bears	Giant Center	Recap
Brogan Rafferty (2) – pp – 18:39		First period		13:24 – pp – Ethen Frank (1)
No scoring		Second period		1:05 – Joe Snively (2); 17:18 – pp – Sam Anas (4)
Carsen Twarynski (5) – 6:33; Cameron Hughes (2) – pp – 15:26; Cameron Hughes (3) – 19:09		Third period		7:21 – Garrett Pilon (3)
No scoring		First overtime period		13:34 – Riley Sutter (2)
Joey Daccord (25 saves / 30 shots)		Goalie stats		Hunter Shepard (33 saves / 37 shots)

June 15	Coachella Valley Firebirds	2–3	Hershey Bears	Giant Center	Recap
Austin Poganski (2) – 12:41		First period	4:27 – pp – Mike Vecchione (3)
No scoring		Second period	3:03 – Mike Vecchione (4); 14:24 – Ethen Frank (2)
Jesper Froden (5) – 7:01		Third period	No scoring
Joey Daccord (25 saves / 28 shots)		Goalie stats	Hunter Shepard (19 saves / 21 shots)

June 17	Coachella Valley Firebirds	0–1	OT	Hershey Bears	Giant Center	Recap
No scoring		First period		No scoring
No scoring		Second period		No scoring
No scoring		Third period		No scoring
No scoring		First overtime period		10:01 – Garrett Pilon (4)
Joey Daccord (30 saves / 31 shots)		Goalie stats		Hunter Shepard (21 saves / 21 shots)

June 19	Hershey Bears	2–5	Coachella Valley Firebirds	Acrisure Arena	Recap
Connor McMichael (5) – 1:33		First period	10:10 – pp – Max McCormick (13); 12:01 – John Hayden (1); 16:52 – Cameron Hughes (4)
Beck Malenstyn (4) – 3:28		Second period	11:50 – pp – Kole Lind (8)
No scoring		Third period	3:57 – Kole Lind (9)
Hunter Shepard (17 saves / 22 shots); Zachary Fucale (6 saves / 6 shots)		Goalie stats	Joey Daccord (20 saves / 22 shots)

June 21	Hershey Bears	3–2	OT	Coachella Valley Firebirds	Acrisure Arena	Recap
No scoring		First period		4:41 – Ryker Evans (5)
Connor McMichael (6) – pp – 13:52; Hendrix Lapierre (3) – 17:09		Second period		0:24 – Max McCormick (14)
No scoring		Third period		No scoring
Mike Vecchione (5) – 16:19		First overtime period		No scoring
Hunter Shepard (45 saves / 47 shots)		Goalie stats		Joey Daccord (35 saves / 38 shots)

Hershey won series 4–3

== Playoff statistical leaders ==
=== Leading skaters ===
These are the top ten skaters based on points. If there is a tie in points, goals take precedence over assists.

Player	Team	GP	G	A	Pts	PIM
Kole Lind	Coachella Valley Firebirds	26	9	22	31	16
Max McCormick	Coachella Valley Firebirds	26	14	13	27	16
Ryker Evans	Coachella Valley Firebirds	26	5	21	26	26
Cameron Hughes	Coachella Valley Firebirds	26	4	19	23	14
Alexander True	Coachella Valley Firebirds	26	7	12	19	6
Luke Evangelista	Milwaukee Admirals	16	4	11	15	4
Joe Snively	Hershey Bears	20	2	13	15	6
Logan Day	Hershey Bears	19	3	11	14	4
Michael Mersch	Rochester Americans	14	6	7	13	4
Mason Morelli	Hershey Bears	20	5	8	13	28
Aliaksei Protas	Hershey Bears	20	5	8	13	2

=== Leading goaltenders ===
This is a combined table of the top five goaltenders based on goals against average and the top five goaltenders based on save percentage with at least 60 minutes played. The table is initially sorted by goals against average, with the criterion for inclusion in bold.

Player	Team	GP	W	L	SA	GA	GAA	SV%	SO	TOI
Jean-Francois Berube	Charlotte Checkers	5	1	1	80	5	**1.54**	**.938**	1	195:12
Dylan Garand	Hartford Wolf Pack	8	5	3	216	14	**1.76**	**.935**	2	477:14
Spencer Martin	Abbotsford Canucks	4	2	2	112	8	**1.92**	**.929**	1	250:15
Joey Daccord	Coachella Valley Firebirds	26	15	11	823	61	**2.22**	**.926**	3	1,647:42
Oskari Salminen	Manitoba Moose	4	2	2	117	9	**2.25**	.923	0	239:55
Brandon Bussi	Providence Bruins	4	1	3	122	9	2.28	**.926**	0	237:18

Preceded by 2022 Calder Cup playoffs	Calder Cup playoffs 2023	Succeeded by 2024 Calder Cup playoffs
