= Mason Morelli =

American ice hockey player (born 1996)

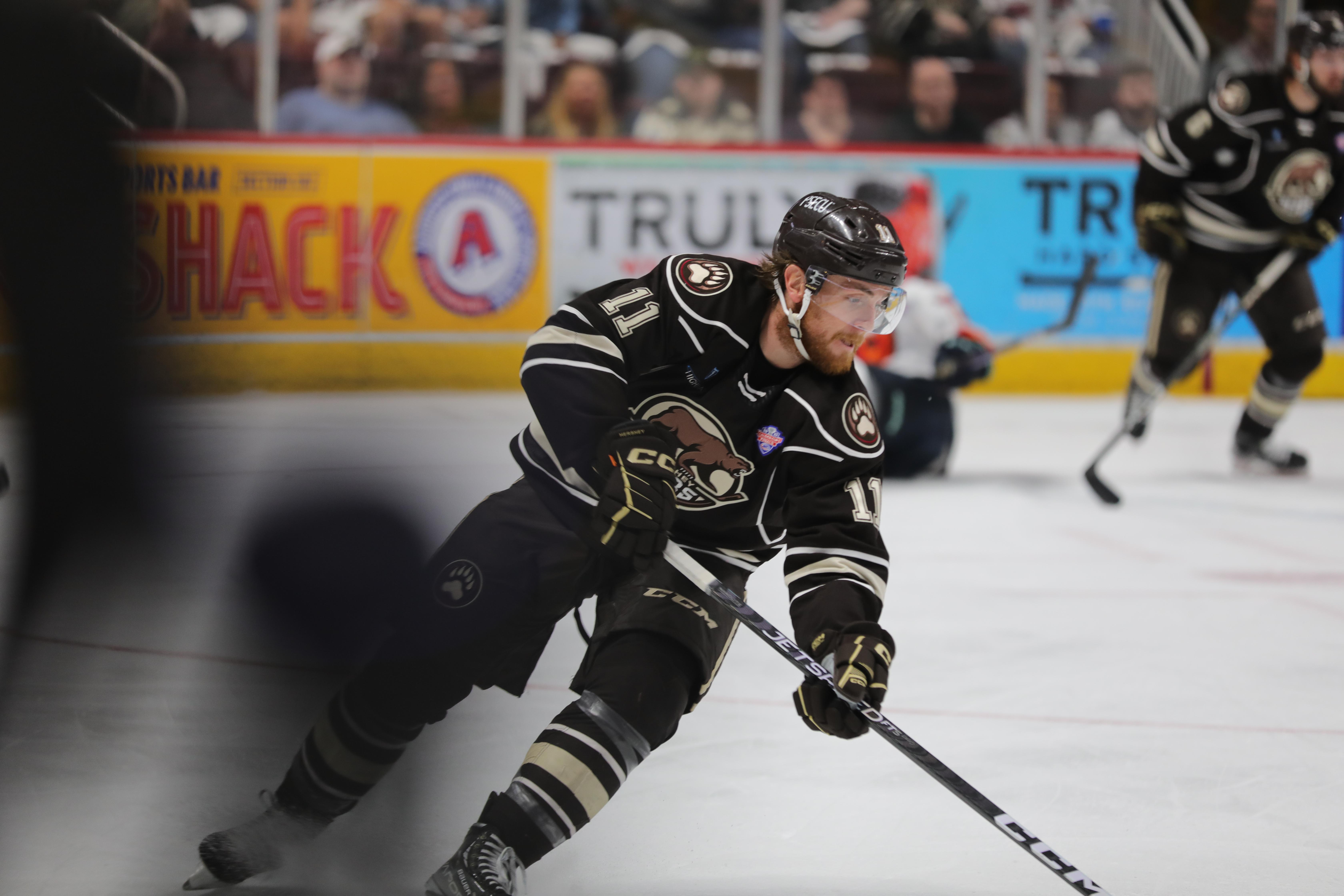
- Morelli with the Hershey Bears during the 2023 Calder Cup Finals
- Born: February 1, 1996 (age 30) Minot, North Dakota, U.S.
- Height: 6 ft 1 in (185 cm)
- Weight: 201 lb (91 kg; 14 st 5 lb)
- Position: Center
- Shoots: Left
- KHL team Former teams: Barys Astana; Vegas Golden Knights
- NHL draft: Undrafted
- Playing career: 2019–present

Mason Morelli (born February 1, 1996) is an American professional ice hockey center for Barys Astana of the Kontinental Hockey League (KHL). After playing junior ice hockey with the Minot Minotauros of the North American Hockey League (NAHL) and Fargo Force of the United States Hockey League (USHL), Morelli went undrafted into the National Hockey League (NHL), and subsequently played four years of college ice hockey at the University of Nebraska Omaha. After his time in Omaha, he spent several seasons in the minor leagues, signing his first professional contract with the Stockton Heat of the American Hockey League (AHL) in 2019, followed by periods in the ECHL with the Kansas City Mavericks and South Carolina Stingrays. After winning the Calder Cup with the Hershey Bears in 2023, Morelli signed his first NHL contract with the Vegas Golden Knights in July 2023, and made his NHL debut for the Golden Knights in February 2024. Having scored both his first goal and first assist in his first game, Morelli is the first player in Golden Knights franchise history to record a multi-point game in his debut.

== Early life ==
Morelli was born on February 1, 1996, in Minot, North Dakota, U.S. to Matt and Kelly Morelli. Morelli's father and grandfather both played college ice hockey at the University of North Dakota; his grandfather Reg scored the game-winning overtime goal in the 1959 NCAA national championship, winning the North Dakota Fighting Sioux their first-ever NCAA title, and was named the tournament's Most Outstanding Player. While Morelli was the only member of his immediate family to attend the University of Nebraska Omaha, Morelli's cousin Bella committed to compete with the Mavericks as a collegiate diver in 2022.

== Playing career ==
=== Junior hockey ===
Growing up in Minot, Morelli played for Minot High School in the North Dakota High School Activities Association and the Colorado Rampage in the Tier 1 Elite Hockey League. He played four games with the Rampage in 2011–12, tallying one assist and 20 penalty minutes. After tallying 22 goals and 18 assists at Minot High School in the 2011–12 season, he joined the Minot Minotauros of the tier II junior North American Hockey League (NAHL). He played 11 games with the Minotauros, tallying one goal and two assists for three points and seven penalty minutes. As a result of his overall play, Morelli was drafted third overall in the 2012 United States Hockey League (USHL) Futures Draft by the Fargo Force.

Following the USHL Draft, Morelli returned to the Minotauros for the 2012–13 season. He tallied 12 goals and 15 assists for 27 points over 54 games and was selected for the 2013 NAHL Top Prospects Tournament. Morelli's improved play was also recognized by the NHL Central Scouting Bureau who considered him a possible late sixth or seventh round draft pick in the 2014 NHL entry draft. While competing with the Minotauros, Morelli was approached by University of Nebraska Omaha coach Dean Blais to encourage him to commit to his school. While Morelli originally wished to follow his father and grandfather's paths and play for North Dakota, they both encouraged him to play for Blais. Following the conclusion of the 2012–13 season, Morelli joined the Fargo Force for the 2013–14 USHL season at the age of 17. Morelli played two seasons with Fargo and accumulated 18 goals and 20 assists for 38 points over 113 career games.

=== Collegiate ===
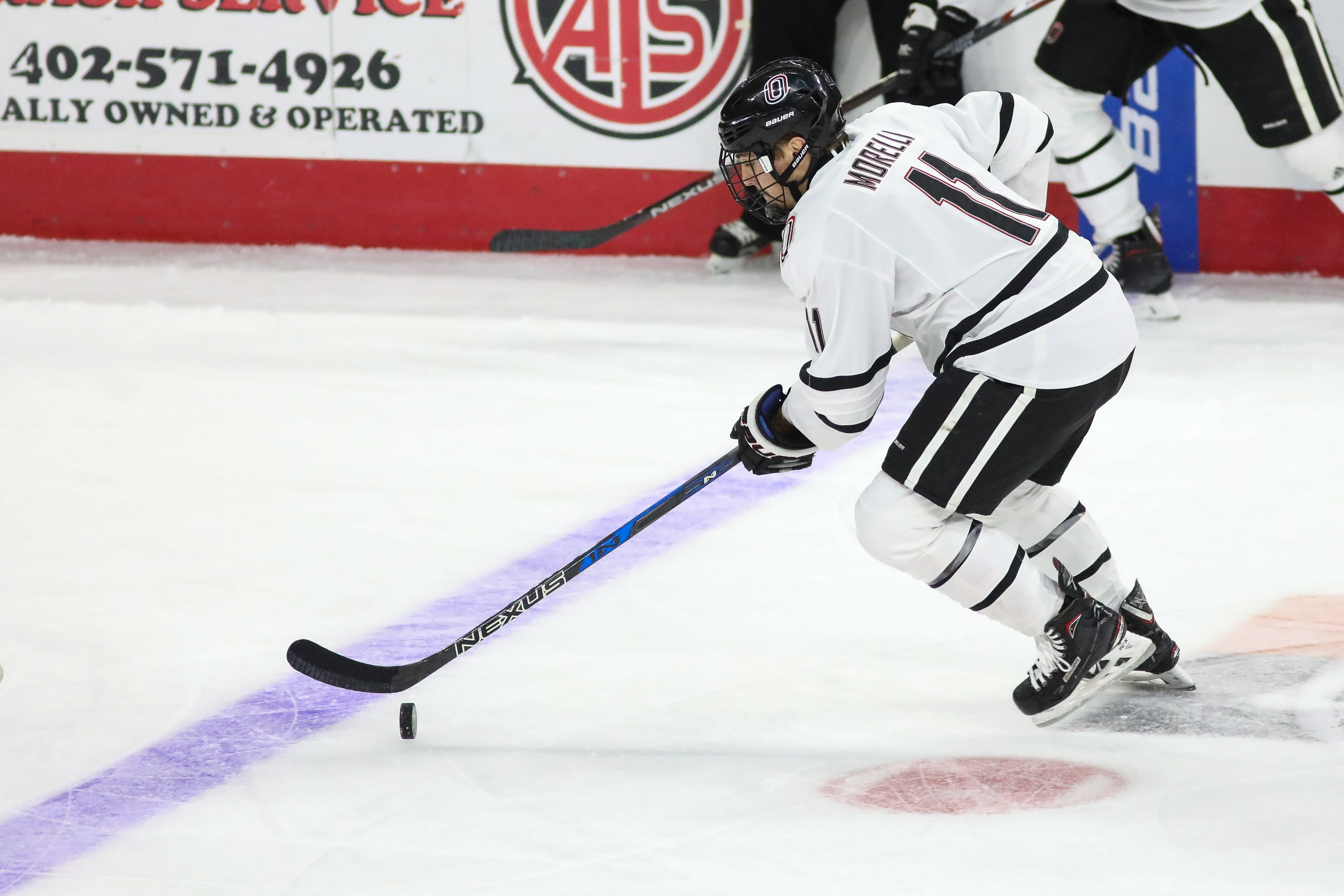
Morelli while playing with the Omaha Mavericks in December 2017

After going undrafted in the 2014 NHL entry draft, Morelli played four years of college hockey at the University of Nebraska Omaha. Morelli made his NCAA debut for the Mavericks on October 9, 2015, against Minnesota State and scored his first collegiate goal on December 5 against St. Cloud State. He later recorded his first career two-goal game against Miami University on January 23, although the Mavericks lost 7–3. Morelli finished the season with seven goals and four assists for 11 points over 31 games and was named to the NCHC Academic All-Conference Team and the NCHC Scholar-Athlete Team.

Ahead of the 2018–19 season, Morelli was named captain of the Mavericks.

=== Professional ===
==== Minor leagues ====
After his time with Omaha, Morelli's first professional experience came as an amateur try-out agreement with the Stockton Heat, the then-American Hockey League (AHL) affiliate of the Calgary Flames, during the 2018–19 season. During his nine-game stint, Morelli recorded his first professional goal on April 10, 2019, against the Ontario Reign, subsequently scoring again in each of the Heat's final two games, and finishing his brief season with four points. Morelli later signed his first professional contract with Stockton on May 20, extending him through the 2019–20 season; Morelli also attended the Flames' training camp prior to the 2019–20 NHL season, but was reassigned to the Heat for the duration of their season. During this time, Morelli also spent a short period in the ECHL with the Kansas City Mavericks, the Heat's affiliate. He ultimately recorded just four goals and eight points over 31 games in his second season with Stockton.

As a free agent following the conclusion of his Heat contract, Morelli opted to sign with the AHL's Hershey Bears on September 20, 2020. Morelli split the 2020–21 season between Hershey and their ECHL affiliate, the South Carolina Stingrays; while failing to score a goal during his first season with the Bears, he recorded five assists, in addition to four goals and nine points for the Stingrays. Morelli then signed a further one-year extension with Hershey in the off-season, before spending the entire 2021–22 season with the club. After beginning the year as a healthy scratch, Morelli became an offensive contributor to the Bears, posting four goals and 10 points through the halfway-point of the year, ultimately setting new career highs with 12 goals, 21 assists, and 33 points. Morelli also made his AHL playoff debut, skating in all three games of the Bears' first-round loss to the Wilkes-Barre/Scranton Penguins, before signing a further one-year extension with Hershey for the 2022–23 season on May 23, 2022. In a second consecutive season of career highs, Morelli tied his goal total from the prior year in 2022–23, while posting 29 assists for a total of 41 points, and winning the Bears' Man of the Year and Unsung Hero awards. Morelli's success continued in the 2023 Calder Cup playoffs; despite playing on the Bears' fourth line, Morelli totaled five goals and 13 points during Hershey's 20-game playoff run, which ultimately concluded in the franchise's 12th Calder Cup victory.

==== Vegas Golden Knights (2023–2025) ====
After concluding his tenure in Hershey with a Calder Cup championship, Morelli signed his first National Hockey League (NHL) contract, a two-year agreement with the defending Stanley Cup champion Vegas Golden Knights, on July 1, 2023. Morelli initially spent 2023–24 season with Vegas' AHL affiliate, the Henderson Silver Knights, with 23 points in 44 games through early February 2024; however, due to main-roster injuries, Morelli was officially called up to the Golden Knights on February 17, marking his first tenure on an NHL roster. He then made his NHL debut with Vegas on February 19, against the San Jose Sharks, and recorded his first NHL goal 19 minutes into the game, deflecting a pass from defenseman Alex Pietrangelo past Sharks goaltender Mackenzie Blackwood; later, in the second period, Morelli recorded his first NHL assist on a goal by forward Keegan Kolesar, becoming the first player in Golden Knights franchise history to record a multi-point game in his debut.

==== Barys Astana (2025–present) ====
Following two years in the Golden Knights' organization, Morelli went overseas, signing a one-year contract with Barys Astana of the Kontinental Hockey League (KHL) on August 21, 2025.

== Career statistics ==
			Regular season					Playoffs
Season	Team	League	GP	G	A	Pts	PIM	GP	G	A	Pts	PIM
2011–12	Minot Minotauros	NAHL	11	1	2	3	7	—	—	—	—	—
2012–13	Minot Minotauros	NAHL	54	12	15	27	74	4	0	1	1	12
2013–14	Fargo Force	USHL	57	6	9	15	72	—	—	—	—	—
2014–15	Fargo Force	USHL	56	12	11	23	52	—	—	—	—	—
2015–16	University of Nebraska Omaha	NCHC	31	7	4	11	28	—	—	—	—	—
2016–17	University of Nebraska Omaha	NCHC	37	7	11	18	43	—	—	—	—	—
2017–18	University of Nebraska Omaha	NCHC	16	4	10	14	28	—	—	—	—	—
2018–19	University of Nebraska Omaha	NCHC	39	19	15	34	12	—	—	—	—	—
2018–19	Stockton Heat	AHL	9	3	1	4	7	—	—	—	—	—
2019–20	Stockton Heat	AHL	31	4	4	8	15	—	—	—	—	—
2019–20	Kansas City Mavericks	ECHL	5	3	4	7	2	—	—	—	—	—
2020–21	South Carolina Stingrays	ECHL	11	4	5	9	2	—	—	—	—	—
2020–21	Hershey Bears	AHL	15	0	5	5	21	—	—	—	—	—
2021–22	Hershey Bears	AHL	68	12	21	33	56	3	0	1	1	2
2022–23	Hershey Bears	AHL	72	12	29	41	72	20	5	8	13	28
2023–24	Henderson Silver Knights	AHL	56	13	16	29	39	—	—	—	—	—
2023–24	Vegas Golden Knights	NHL	9	3	1	4	0	—	—	—	—	—
2024–25	Henderson Silver Knights	AHL	48	13	6	19	38	—	—	—	—	—
2024–25	Vegas Golden Knights	NHL	1	0	0	0	0	—	—	—	—	—
2025–26	Barys Astana	KHL	63	12	24	36	75	—	—	—	—	—
NHL totals			10	3	1	4	0	—	—	—	—	—
KHL totals			63	12	24	36	75	—	—	—	—	—

== Awards and honours ==
Award	Year	Ref
College
NCHC Second All-Star Team	2019	
AHL
Calder Cup champion	2023	
