= Lucas Johansen =

Canadian ice hockey player (born 1997)

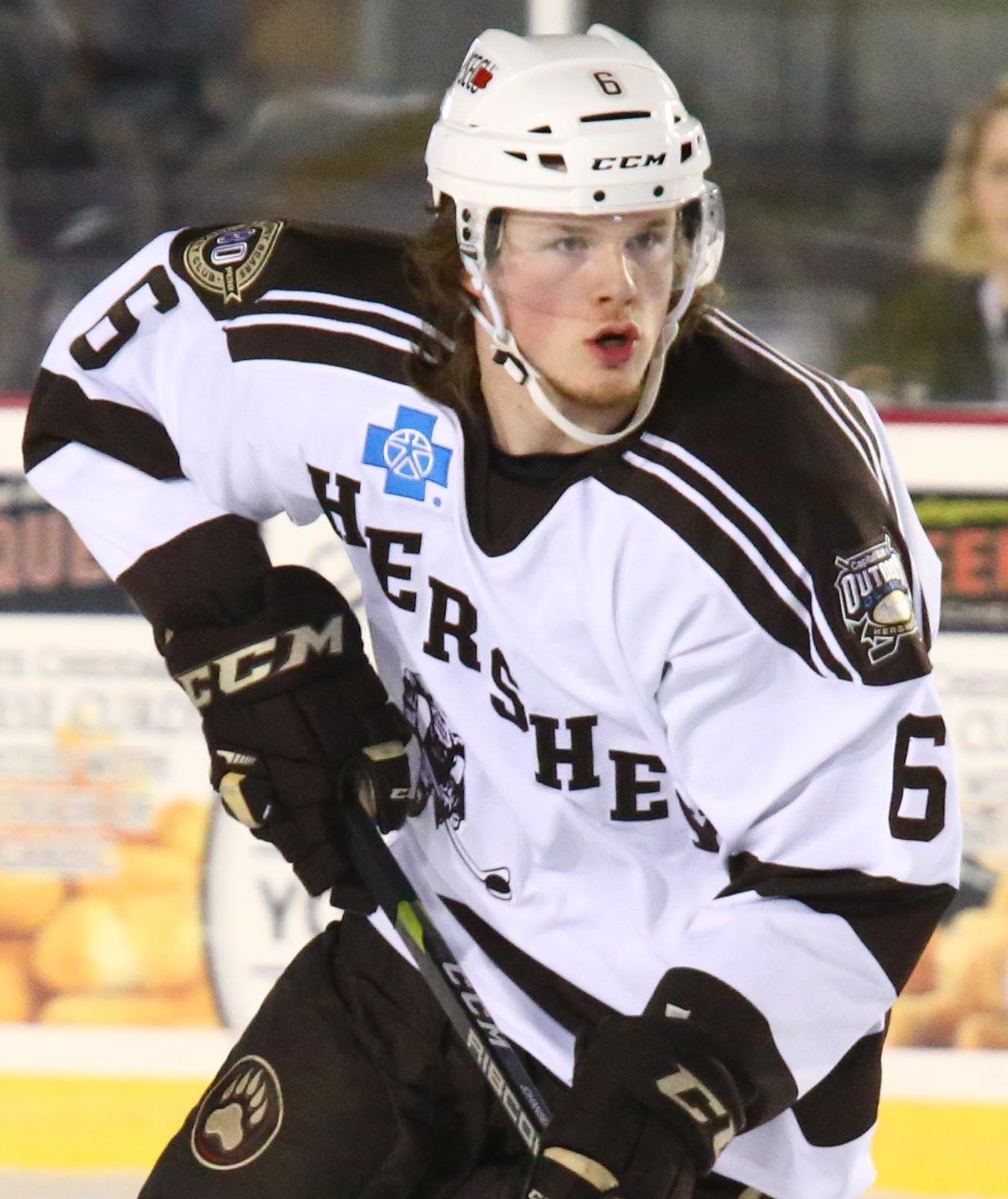
- Johansen with the Hershey Bears in 2018
- Born: November 16, 1997 (age 28) Port Moody, British Columbia, Canada
- Height: 6 ft 2 in (188 cm)
- Weight: 176 lb (80 kg; 12 st 8 lb)
- Position: Defence
- Shoots: Left
- team Former teams: Free agent Washington Capitals
- NHL draft: 28th overall, 2016; Washington Capitals
- Playing career: 2017–present

Lucas Johansen (born November 16, 1997) is a Canadian professional ice hockey defenceman who is currently an unrestricted free agent. He most recently played for the Henderson Silver Knights of the American Hockey League (AHL). Johansen was selected 28th overall in the 2016 NHL entry draft by the Washington Capitals of the National Hockey League (NHL), for whom he played parts of three NHL seasons.

== Playing career ==
Johansen was originally drafted by the Kelowna Rockets, 119th overall in the 2012 WHL Bantam draft, and played two seasons of midget hockey in the BC Hockey Major Midget League with the Vancouver North East Chiefs before joining the Rockets for the 2014–15 season.

On March 2, 2017, Johansen was signed to a three-year, entry-level contract with the Washington Capitals. At the conclusion of his third season with the Rockets in 2016–17, Johansen signed an amateur try-out contract to join the Capitals' American Hockey League affiliate, the Hershey Bears, during their post-season run on May 2, 2017. He trained without making an appearance for the Bears during their second round defeat.

Johansen was cut from the 2017–18 Washington Capitals training camp, and reassigned to Hershey for the 2017–18 AHL season. He eventually made his NHL debut with the Capitals on December 31, 2021, picking up his first career NHL assist and point in a win over Detroit. Johansen later won the Calder Cup with the Bears in 2023 and 2024.

As a free agent following the 2023–24 NHL season, Johansen signed a one-year contract with the AHL Henderson Silver Knights on November 7, 2024, shortly after the start of the 2024–25 AHL season. Johansen notched 11 assists through 38 regular season games from the blueline for Henderson.

On July 22, 2025, Johansen agreed to a one-year contract extension to remain with the Silver Knights for the 2025–26 season.

== Personal life ==
Lucas' older brother Ryan is a forward who most recently played for the Colorado Avalanche.

== Career statistics ==
| | | | Regular season | | | | | Playoffs |
| Season | Team | League | GP | G | A | Pts | PIM | GP | G | A | Pts | PIM |
|---|---|---|---|---|---|---|---|---|---|---|---|---|
| 2012–13 | Vancouver NE Chiefs | BCMML | 40 | 3 | 7 | 10 | 8 | 3 | 0 | 1 | 1 | 0 |
| 2013–14 | Vancouver NE Chiefs | BCMML | 40 | 7 | 17 | 24 | 26 | — | — | — | — | — |
| 2014–15 | Kelowna Rockets | WHL | 65 | 1 | 7 | 8 | 16 | 19 | 1 | 4 | 5 | 6 |
| 2015–16 | Kelowna Rockets | WHL | 69 | 10 | 39 | 49 | 20 | 18 | 2 | 6 | 8 | 8 |
| 2016–17 | Kelowna Rockets | WHL | 68 | 6 | 35 | 41 | 39 | 17 | 0 | 8 | 8 | 6 |
| 2017–18 | Hershey Bears | AHL | 74 | 6 | 21 | 27 | 22 | — | — | — | — | — |
| 2018–19 | Hershey Bears | AHL | 45 | 3 | 11 | 14 | 22 | 9 | 0 | 2 | 2 | 2 |
| 2019–20 | Hershey Bears | AHL | 9 | 0 | 2 | 2 | 2 | — | — | — | — | — |
| 2020–21 | Hershey Bears | AHL | 5 | 0 | 2 | 2 | 2 | — | — | — | — | — |
| 2021–22 | Hershey Bears | AHL | 62 | 8 | 20 | 28 | 18 | 3 | 0 | 1 | 1 | 0 |
| 2021–22 | Washington Capitals | NHL | 1 | 0 | 1 | 1 | 0 | — | — | — | — | — |
| 2022–23 | Hershey Bears | AHL | 40 | 1 | 6 | 7 | 10 | 20 | 2 | 4 | 6 | 12 |
| 2022–23 | Washington Capitals | NHL | 2 | 0 | 0 | 0 | 0 | — | — | — | — | — |
| 2023–24 | Washington Capitals | NHL | 6 | 0 | 1 | 1 | 4 | 2 | 0 | 0 | 0 | 0 |
| 2023–24 | Hershey Bears | AHL | 22 | 2 | 10 | 12 | 6 | 9 | 0 | 5 | 5 | 0 |
| 2024–25 | Henderson Silver Knights | AHL | 38 | 0 | 11 | 11 | 28 | — | — | — | — | — |
| 2025–26 | Henderson Silver Knights | AHL | 30 | 2 | 3 | 5 | 10 | 6 | 1 | 1 | 2 | 2 |
| NHL totals | | | 9 | 0 | 2 | 2 | 4 | 2 | 0 | 0 | 0 | 0 |

== Awards and honours ==
| Award | Year | Ref |
|---|---|---|
AHL
| Calder Cup | 2023, 2024 | |

Awards and achievements
| Preceded by Ilya Samsonov | Washington Capitals first-round draft pick 2016 | Succeeded by Alexander Alexeyev |
