= Ryker Evans =

Canadian ice hockey player (born 2001)

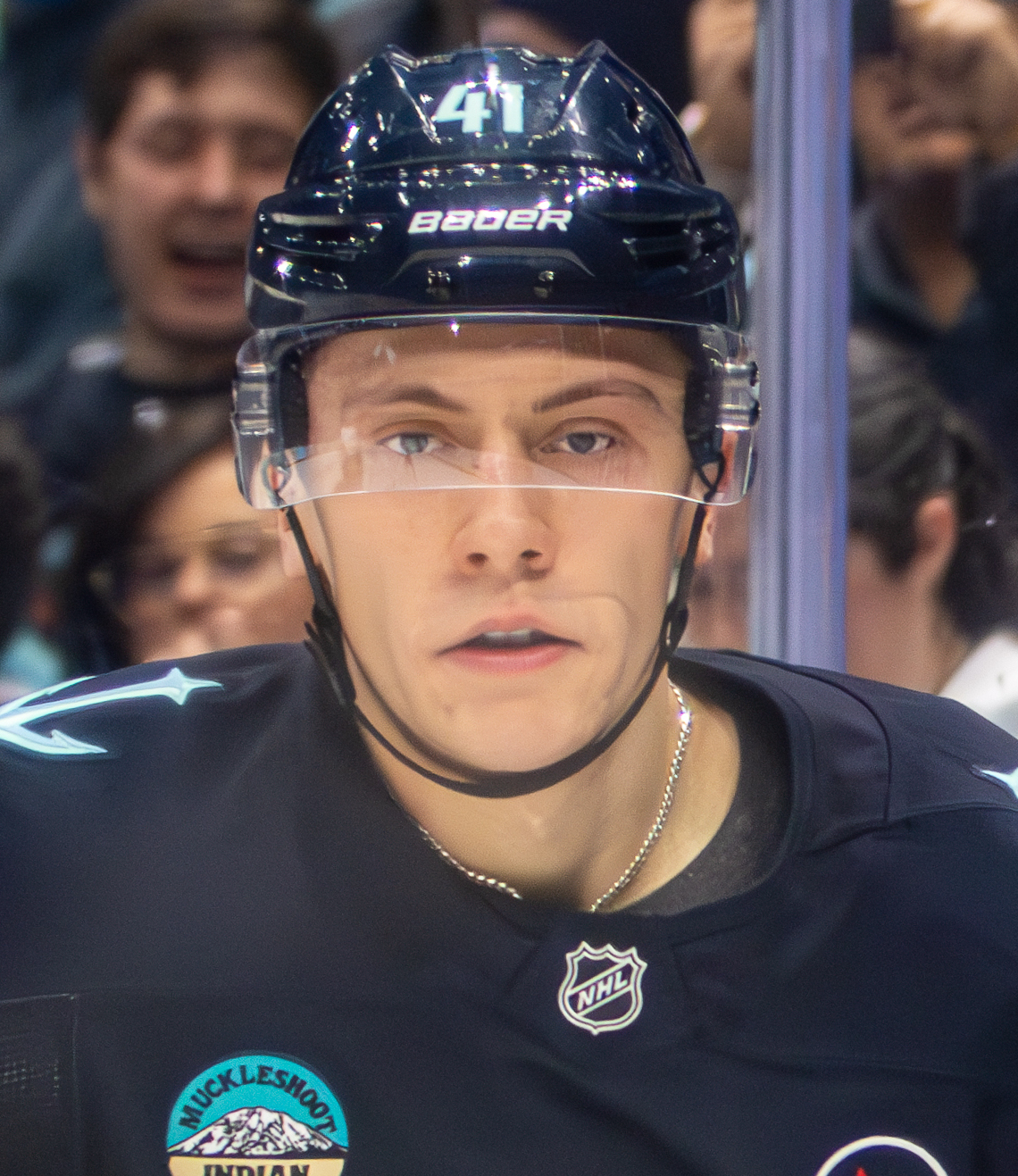
- Evans with the Seattle Kraken in 2025
- Born: December 13, 2001 (age 24) Calgary, Alberta, Canada
- Height: 5 ft 11 in (180 cm)
- Weight: 195 lb (88 kg; 13 st 13 lb)
- Position: Defence
- Shoots: Left
- NHL team: Seattle Kraken
- National team: Canada
- NHL draft: 35th overall, 2021; Seattle Kraken
- Playing career: 2022–present

Ryker Garth Evans (born on December 13, 2001) is a Canadian professional ice hockey player who is a defenceman for the Seattle Kraken of the National Hockey League (NHL). He was selected with the 35th overall pick by the Kraken in the 2021 NHL entry draft. He previously played with the Regina Pats of the Western Hockey League (WHL).

== Playing career ==
=== Junior ===
Evans played with the Notre Dame Hounds of the Saskatchewan Male U18 AAA Hockey League. He won a gold medal and was named the tournament's top defenceman while competing for the Telus Cup in 2018.

Evans was selected by the Regina Pats of the Western Hockey League (WHL) in the tenth round, 209th overall, in the 2016 WHL bantam draft. In the 2018–19 season, he played 45 games, recording one goal and 10 assists for 11 points in his first season with the Pats. In the 2020–21 season, he was named assistant captain of the Pats. In the 2021–22 season, still with the Pats, he registered 15 goals and 47 assists in 63 games. He was then selected as the 35th overall pick by the Seattle Kraken in the 2021 NHL entry draft.

=== Professional ===
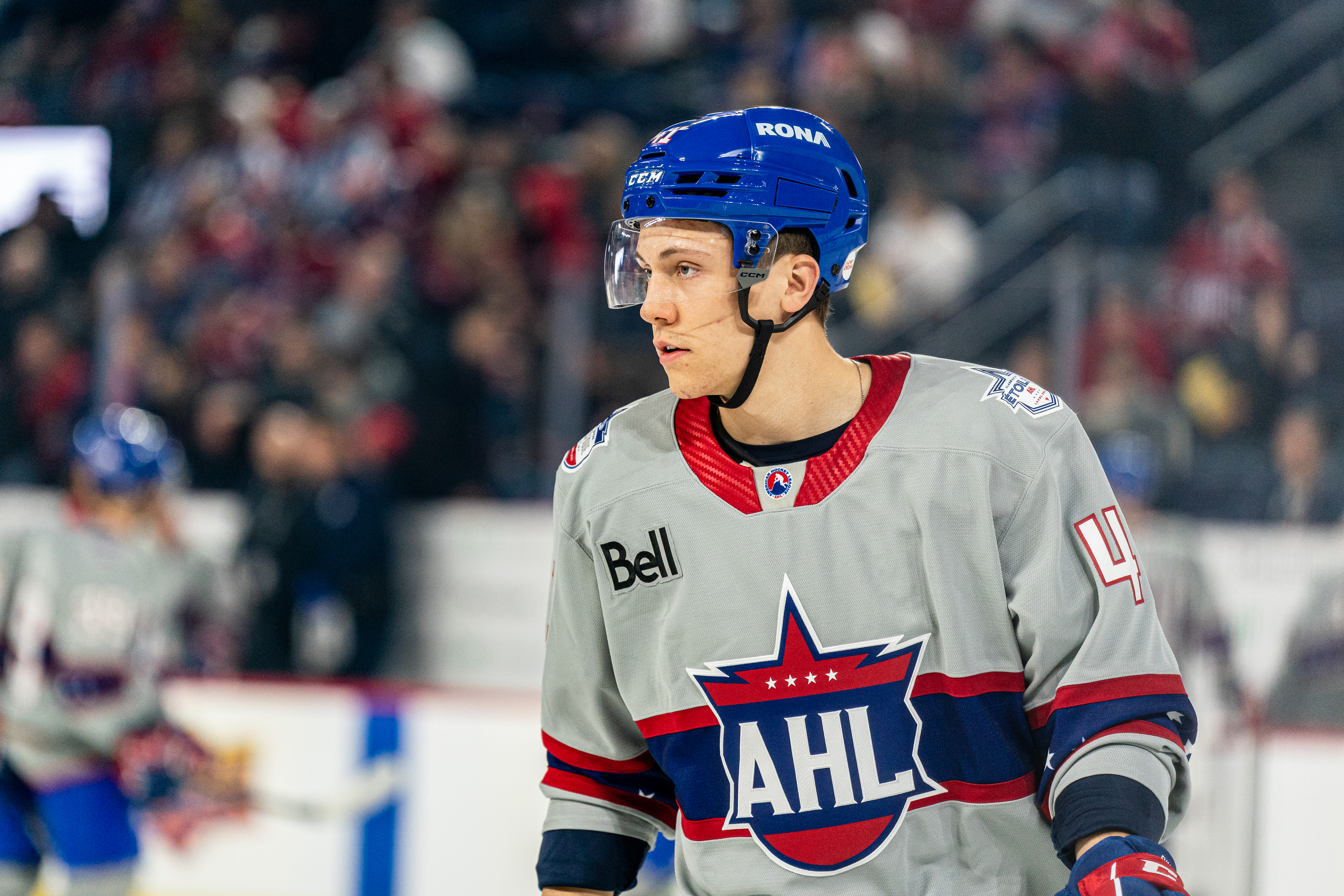
Evans at the 2023 AHL All-Star Classic

On April 22, 2022, Evans signed a three-year, entry-level contract with the Seattle Kraken. In May 2022, he signed an amateur tryout offer with the Charlotte Checkers, the Kraken's temporary American Hockey League (AHL) affiliate. He then helped the Checkers in the Calder Cup playoffs.

After attending the Kraken's 2022 training camp, Evans was reassigned to play with the team's new AHL affiliate, the Coachella Valley Firebirds. Evans helped the Firebirds off to a successful start, leading the league amongst rookie defenseman in points in earning a selection to the AHL All-Star Classic. Evans played with the Firebirds during the 2023 Calder Cup playoffs, making it to the Calder Cup Final, losing in game seven to the Hershey Bears, while managing 26 points in 26 games.

Evans made his NHL debut with the Kraken on December 7, 2023, in a 2–1 loss to the New Jersey Devils, where he was placed on a line with Brian Dumoulin. He recorded his first NHL point, an assist, on December 12, in a 4–0 win against the Florida Panthers. Evans scored his first NHL goal on March 22, 2024, in a 2–1 overtime loss to the Arizona Coyotes. He signed a two-year contract extension with the Kraken on August 11, 2025, with a $2.05 million average annual value.

== Personal life ==
In fourth grade, Evans was diagnosed with celiac disease, which causes a reaction in the small intestine to eating gluten.

== Career statistics ==
=== Regular season and playoffs ===
			Regular season					Playoffs
Season	Team	League	GP	G	A	Pts	PIM	GP	G	A	Pts	PIM
2014–15	Calgary Royals	AMBHL	2	0	3	3	0	—	—	—	—	—
2015–16	Calgary Royals	AMBHL	36	3	16	19	28	2	1	0	1	2
2015–16	CRAA Blue	AMMHL	5	0	4	4	6	1	1	2	3	2
2016–17	CRAA Blue	AMMHL	36	4	23	27	68	4	0	5	5	4
2017–18	Notre Dame Hounds	SMAAAHL	41	4	16	20	58	9	1	0	1	14
2018–19	Regina Pats	WHL	45	1	10	11	32	—	—	—	—	—
2019–20	Regina Pats	WHL	63	7	24	31	81	—	—	—	—	—
2020–21	Regina Pats	WHL	24	3	25	28	37	—	—	—	—	—
2021–22	Regina Pats	WHL	63	14	47	61	96	—	—	—	—	—
2022–23	Coachella Valley Firebirds	AHL	71	6	38	44	74	26	5	21	26	26
2023–24	Coachella Valley Firebirds	AHL	25	2	13	15	28	18	4	6	10	30
2023–24	Seattle Kraken	NHL	36	1	8	9	20	—	—	—	—	—
2024–25	Seattle Kraken	NHL	73	5	20	25	30	—	—	—	—	—
2025–26	Seattle Kraken	NHL	67	8	9	17	40	—	—	—	—	—
NHL totals			176	14	37	51	90	—	—	—	—	—

=== International ===
Year	Team	Event	Result	GP	G	A	Pts	PIM
2025	Canada	WC	5th	8	0	2	2	2
Senior totals				8	0	2	2	2

== Awards and honours ==
Award	Year	Ref
WHL
East Second All-Star Team	2022	
AHL
All-Star Game	2023	
All-Rookie Team	2023	
