= Ilya Samsonov =

Russian ice hockey player (born 1997)

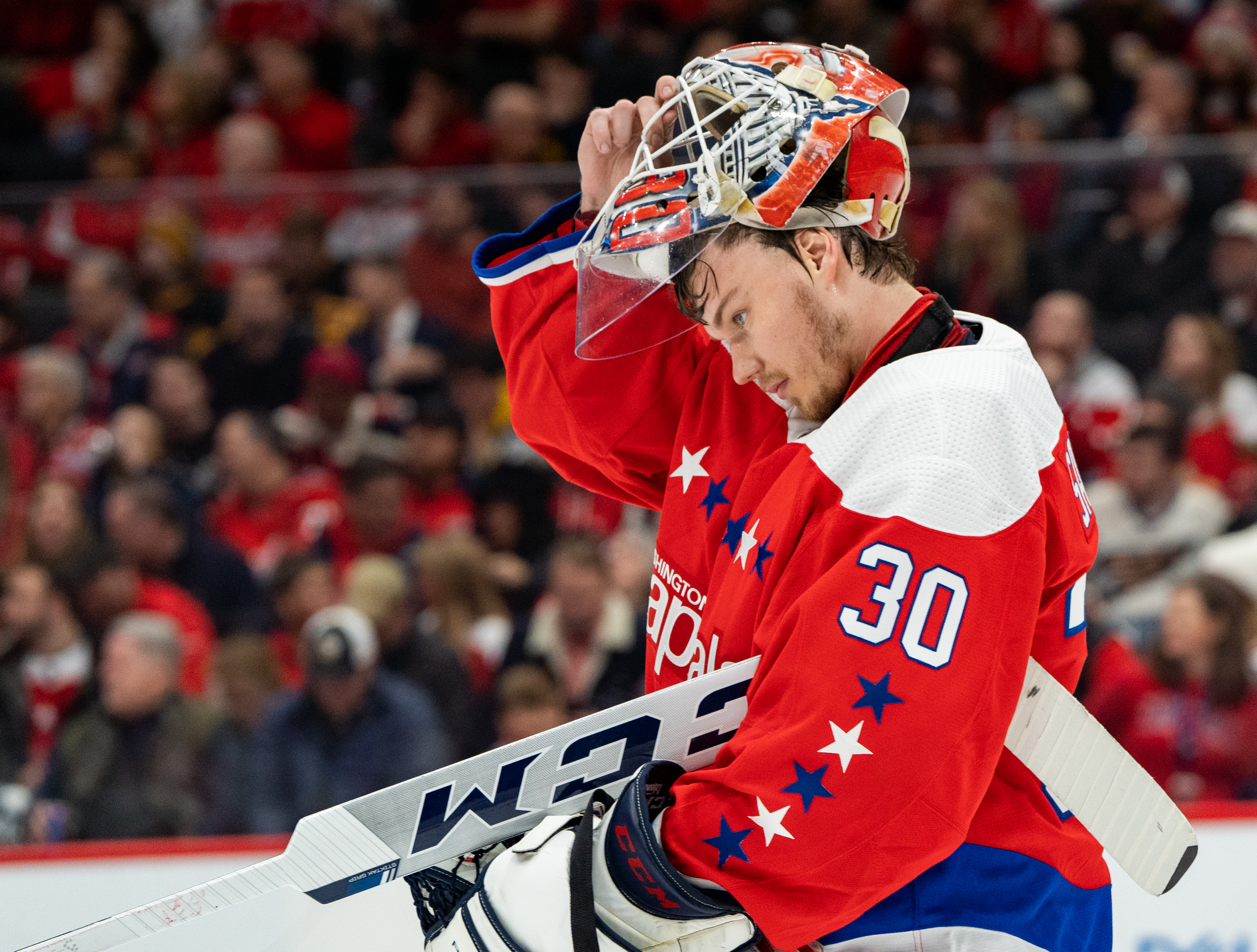
- Samsonov with the Washington Capitals in 2020
- Born: 22 February 1997 (age 29) Magnitogorsk, Russia
- Height: 6 ft 3 in (191 cm)
- Weight: 208 lb (94 kg; 14 st 12 lb)
- Position: Goaltender
- Catches: Left
- NHL team (P) Cur. team Former teams: San Jose Sharks; San Jose Barracuda (AHL); Metallurg Magnitogorsk; Washington Capitals; Toronto Maple Leafs; Vegas Golden Knights; HC Sochi
- NHL draft: 22nd overall, 2015; Washington Capitals
- Playing career: 2014–present

Ilya Alexeyevich Samsonov (/sæmˈsoʊ.nɔːv/, Russian: Илья Алексеевич Самсонов; born 22 February 1997) is a Russian professional ice hockey player who is a goaltender for the San Jose Barracuda of the American Hockey League (AHL), while under contract to the San Jose Sharks of the National Hockey League (NHL). He has previously played for the Washington Capitals, Toronto Maple Leafs, and Vegas Golden Knights of the NHL, as well as Metallurg Magnitogorsk and HC Sochi of the Kontinental Hockey League (KHL).

Growing up in Magnitogorsk, Russia, Samsonov made his KHL debut playing in relief with Metallurg Magnitogorsk during the 2014–15 KHL season. After a successful junior season with Metallurg's Junior club, Stalnye Lisy, Samsonov was ranked as the top European goaltender in the 2015 NHL entry draft. He was eventually drafted 22nd overall by the Washington Capitals, despite missing the scouting combine in Buffalo and conducting no interviews with the team. Following the 2015 draft, Samsonov returned to the KHL where he posted a 6–4–3 record with a 2.04 goals against average and .925 save percentage through 19 games.

Following the 2017–18 KHL season, Samsonov embarked on his NHL career by signing a three-year, entry-level contract with the Capitals. Samsonov participated in the Capitals' training camp but was re-assigned to their American Hockey League (AHL) affiliate, the Hershey Bears, prior to the start of the 2018–19 season. He eventually made his NHL debut the following season while playing in a primary backup role to starter Braden Holtby. Following his debut win, Samsonov subsequently won 10 more to become only the third NHL rookie goaltender to win his first 11 contests and the first since 1973–74.

== Early life ==
Samsonov was born on 22 February 1997, in Magnitogorsk, Russia to mother Natalya. Samsonov became a fan of ice hockey due to the influence of his grandfather, and chose the position of goaltender because he liked the look of the equipment.

== Playing career ==
=== Metallurg Magnitogorsk ===
Growing up in Russia, Samsonov began playing junior hockey with the Stalnye Lisy for the 2014–15 season. While playing with the Lisy, Samsonov posted an 11–4–1 record, 2.66 goals against average, and a .918 save percentage. As a result of his junior play, Samsonov made his Kontinental Hockey League (KHL) debut playing in relief with Metallurg Magnitogorsk on 11 December 2014, against HC Sibir Novosibirsk. Samsonov was ranked as the top European goaltender eligible for the 2015 NHL entry draft and drew comparisons to Andrei Vasilevskiy. He subsequently became the first goaltender drafted in the first round since 2012 and only the third in franchise history when he was drafted 22nd overall. Samsonov was chosen in the first round despite missing the scouting combine in Buffalo and conducting no interviews with the Capitals.

Following the draft, Samsonov returned to the Metallurg Magnitogorsk for the 2015–16 season where he posted a 6–4–3 record with a 2.04 goals against average and .925 save percentage through 19 games. He played a backup role during the 2016 Gagarin Cup playoffs but made six appearances and posted a 2–2–0 record with a 2.29 GAA and a .916 save percentage. Samsonov subsequently helped the Magnitogorsk win the 2016 Gagarin Cup. Once the season concluded, Samsonov attended the Capitals 2016 Development Camp and adjusted to North American ice. Due to the language barrier, Capitals senior director of communications Sergey Kocharov was on the ice when Samsonov was conducting drills during their Development Camp.

After spending time with the Capitals, Samsonov returned to Magnitogorsk for the 2016–17 KHL season. He began the season strong by posting a 6–0–0 record and earned a .919 save percentage and 2.26 goals against average through 10 games played. Samsonov concluded the season posting a 15–3–5 record, a save percentage of .936, and a goals against average of 2.13 through 27 games. In his final KHL season, Samsonov began by posting a 6–5–1 record with a 2.77 goals against average and a .912 save percentage by November 2017. However, he then suffered a concussion during a 3–1 loss to the HC Lada Togliatti after he entered the game in relief of starter Vasily Koshechkin. Samsonov finished the 2017–18 KHL season with a 12–9–1 record, a save percentage of .926, and a goals against average of 2.31 through 26 games. He was the chosen starter for Game 1 of the 2017 Gagarin Cup playoffs and he saved 26 of the 28 shots to lead the team to a win.

=== Washington Capitals ===
Following the 2017–18 season, Samsonov embarked on his NHL career by signing a three-year, entry-level contract with the Washington Capitals on 4 May 2018. After the signing, the Capitals traded Philipp Grubauer to the Colorado Avalanche leaving a backup goaltending spot available which Samsonov was expected to eventually fill. Off the ice, he hired an English tutor to assist with the language barrier and worked on adjusting to North American rink sizes. In September, Samsonov participated in the Capitals training camp but was re-assigned to their American Hockey League (AHL) affiliate, the Hershey Bears, prior to the start of the 2018–19 season.

Upon joining the Bears, Samsonov and the team struggled in their first five games. They recorded no points through five games and Samsonov suffered a lower-body injury that took him nearly a week to recover. He eventually earned his first AHL win on 1 November in a shootout over the Wilkes-Barre/Scranton Penguins by stopping 19 of 22 shots. He posted a 3–5–0 record with a 3.73 goals against average before being called up to serve as backup for Pheonix Copley. He did not make his NHL debut during the call up and was re-assigned to the AHL on 19 November.

Once Samsonov was returned to the Bears, he continued to struggle and was replaced by Vítek Vaněček who tallied a 17–10–5 record through 32 games. However, Samsonov began to improve during the second half of the season and recorded two shutouts. One of the items he worked on was changing his form from playing on his knees to standing taller in net, the Capitals’ preferred positioning. Between 12 January and 27 February, Samsonov recorded three shutouts and posted a 10–0–1 record. By April, Samsonov posted a record of 19–14–5 with a 2.74 goals against average and a .896 save percentage in 36 games.

Samsonov made the opening night roster for the 2019–20 season as Holtby's new backup and he made his NHL debut in a start against the New York Islanders on 4 October 2019. Samsonov made 25 saves in the 2–1 Capitals win, including 17 over the final two periods. Following his debut win, Samsonov subsequently won 10 more to become only the third NHL rookie goaltender to win his first 11 contests and the first since 1973–74. Following his win over the Ottawa Senators on 31 January 2020, Samsonov yielded a 16–2–1 record, 2.11 goals against average, and a .925 save percentage. As a result of his play over this time period, Samsonov led all rookie goaltenders with 15 wins and was projected to replace Holtby who could become an unrestricted free agent. However, following this achievement, Samsonov's playing time decreased once he went 0–4–1 in his last six games before the NHL was paused due to the COVID-19 pandemic. At the time of the pause, Samsonov ranked second among rookie goaltenders in wins behind Mackenzie Blackwood and ranked 15th overall in even-strength save percentage (.923) among the goaltenders who have played at least 25 games. After a four month pause, The Capitals returned to the ice to prepare for the 2020 Stanley Cup playoffs. However, Samsonov was unable to play for the Capitals during their playoff berth as a result of an injury he suffered during the pause in play.

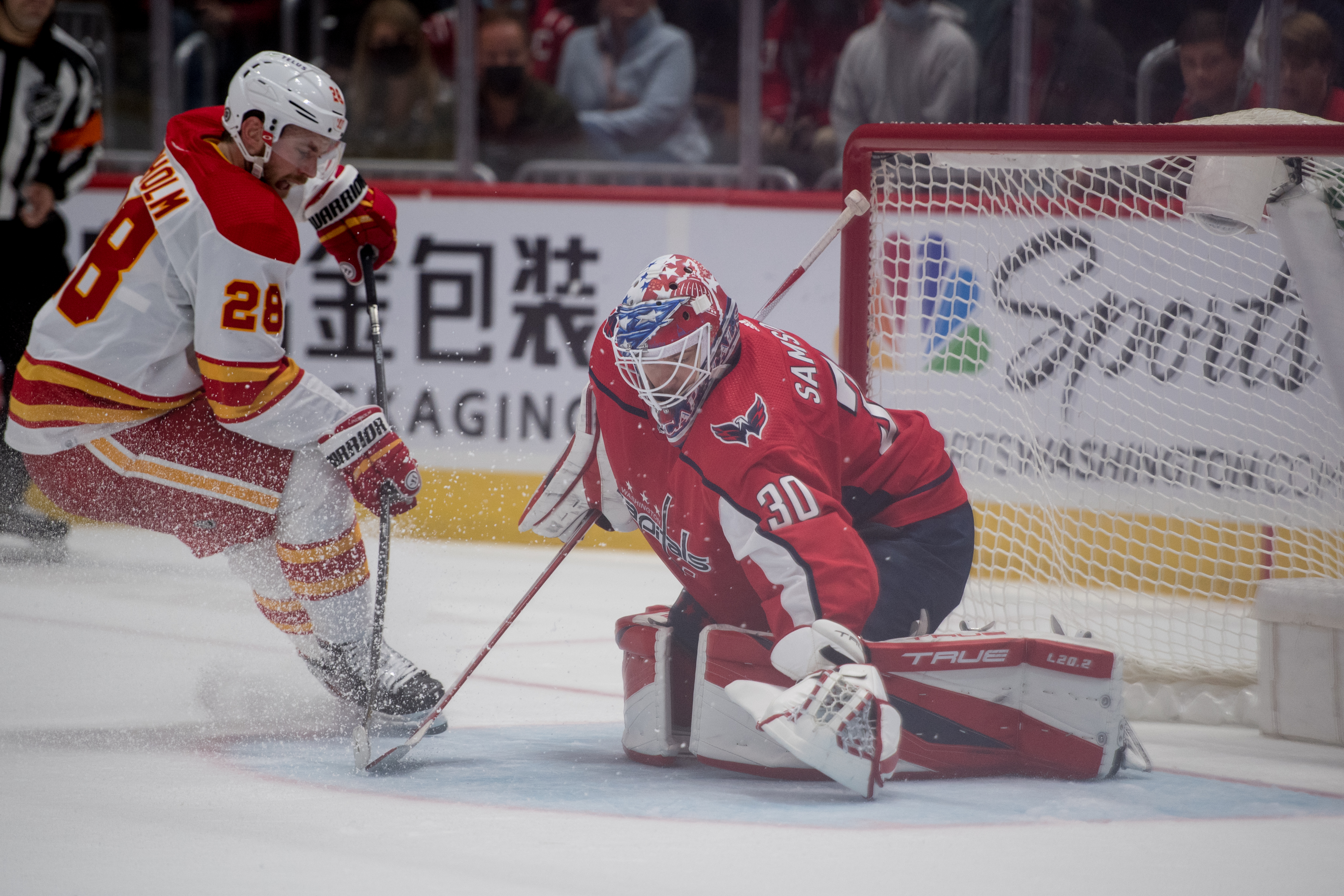
Samsonov during a game against the Calgary Flames in 2021.

After Holtby was not retained, Samsonov became Washington's starter with Henrik Lundqvist serving as a veteran backup for the 2020–21 season. Lundqvist was originally expected to share the net with Samsonov but a heart condition caused him to step away from hockey. Once Lundqvist decided not to return to the Capitals, Samsonov became the Capitals full starter from the beginning of the season. In his first game as Washington's starting netminder, Samsonov stopped 22 of 26 shots to beat the Buffalo Sabres 6–4. However, his success was shortlived as he was placed in quarantine on 21 January and the team was fined $100,000 for player violations of League COVID-19 protocols. Samsonov was removed from COVID protocol on 8 February but spent time with the Hershey Bears on a conditioning stint for an extra 20 days. By May, Samsonov had accumulated a 13–4–1 record with a 2.69 GAA through 19 games before he was scratched for disciplinary reasons on 3 May. Following the healthy scratch, Samsonov was placed in NHL COVID-19 protocols a second time.

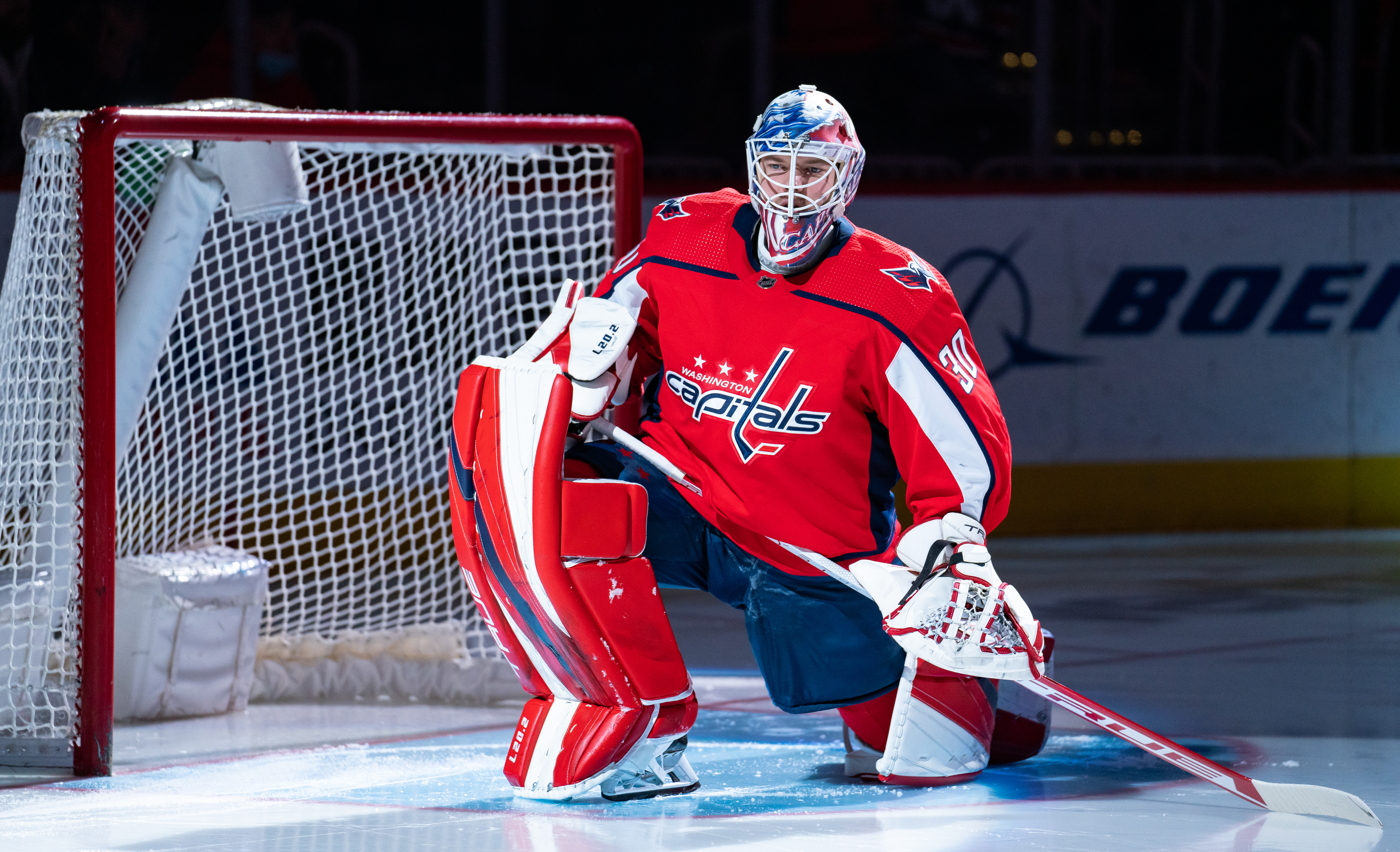
Samsonov before a game against the Ottawa Senators in 2022.

Between injuries and being in and out of coronavirus protocol, Samsonov missed some time, including the first two games of the 2021 Stanley Cup playoffs against the Boston Bruins. Samsonov returned for Game 3 but misplayed the puck during double overtime and turned it over to Craig Smith, who took advantage and scored the game-winning goal, giving the Bruins a 2–1 series lead. The following game, he made 22 saves in the first two periods before Boston scored four goals to win 4–1. The Capitals never recovered and were ultimately eliminated by the Bruins in five games.

Prior to the 2021–22 season, the Washington Capital re-signed Samsonov to a one-year $2 million contract. He began the season strong by recording a 9–1–1 record with a 2.52 goals against average and three shutouts by mid-November. He also did not record a loss in regulation until 30 November in a 5–4 loss to the Florida Panthers. On 6 April 2022, Samsonov made his fourth start in 15 games and stopped 25 of 28 shots by the Tampa Bay Lightning to mark his first 20-win season in the NHL.

=== Toronto Maple Leafs ===
As a free agent from the Capitals, Samsonov opted to sign a one-year, $1.8 million contract for the 2022–23 season with the Toronto Maple Leafs on 13 July 2022. Samsonov was hired in anticipation that he would be the secondary part of a tandem with Matt Murray, but after Murray was injured two games into the 2022–23 season, Samsonov was elevated to the team's starting goaltender for at least the next four weeks. On 5 November, Samsonov was injured on a penalty shot and would have to miss one month of play. Samsonov would finish the season with 27 wins in 42 games played for the Leafs, and would backstop the team to their first playoff series win since 2004.

As a restricted free agent after his first season in Toronto, Samsonov was at an impasse with the Maple Leafs on a new contract. Electing for salary arbitration, Samsonov was awarded a one-year, $3.55 million contract extension on 23 July 2023. On 31 December, he was placed on waivers after he surrendered 22 goals in his last four games.

=== Vegas Golden Knights ===
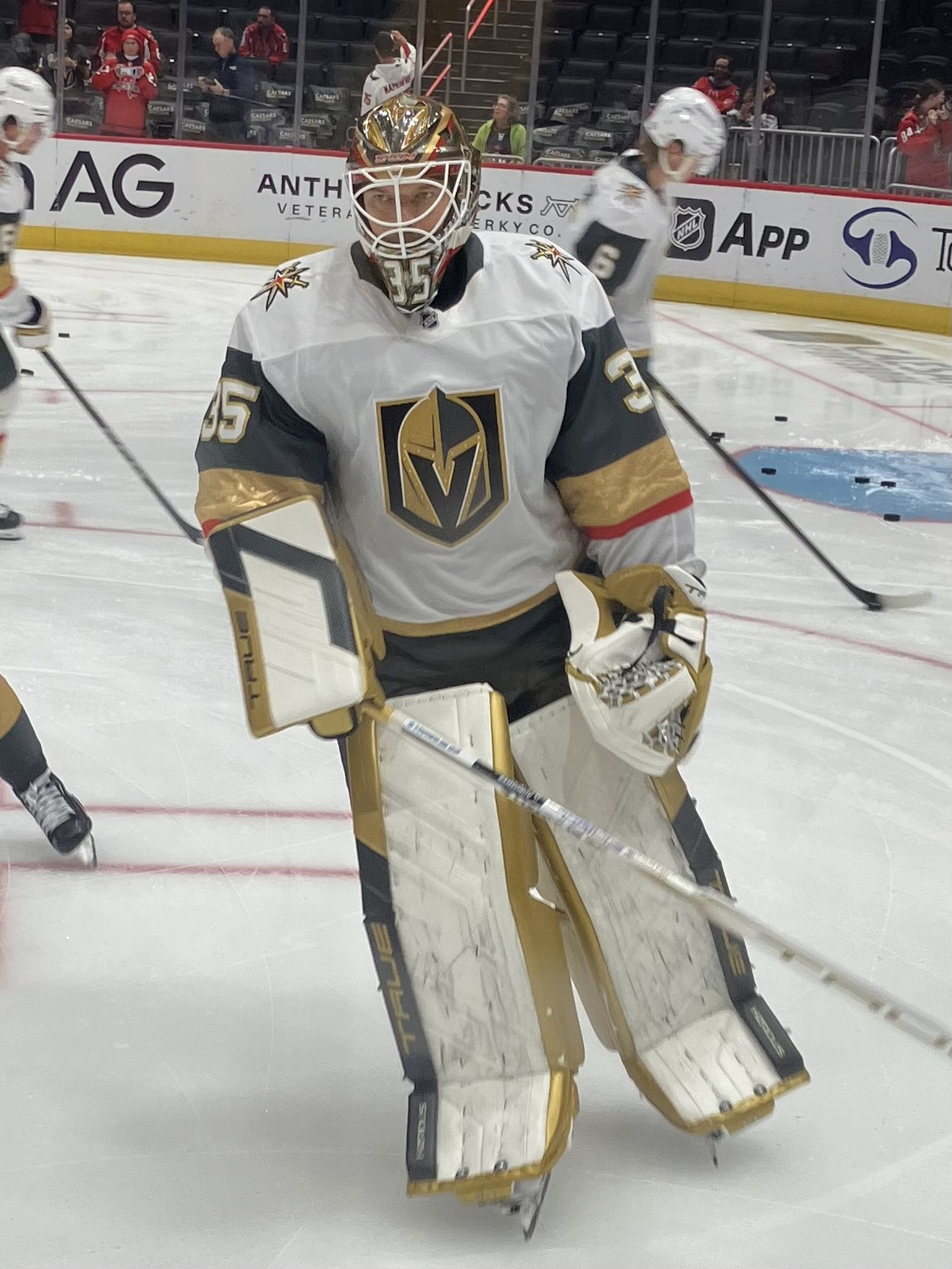
Samsonov with the Golden Knights in 2024.

As a free agent following the 2023–24 season, Samsonov signed a one-year contract with the Vegas Golden Knights on 1 July 2024.

=== HC Sochi ===
On 1 November 2025, Samsonov signed a two-year deal to return to Russia to play with HC Sochi of the KHL.

=== San Jose Sharks ===
On Sept. 8, 2026, the San Jose Sharks announced Samsonov had signed a one-year, two-way contract with the team.

== International play ==
Samsonov has represented Russia on the junior level at numerous international tournaments. He made his international debut during the 2014 World U-17 Hockey Challenge where he helped the Russia men's national under-18 ice hockey team win a bronze medal. The following year, Samsonov represented Russia at the 2015 IIHF World U18 Championships where they placed 5th overall and failed to medal. Despite this, he was recognized as the tournaments top goaltender.

Samsonov later earned his first World Junior silver medal during the 2016 World Junior Ice Hockey Championships.

In his final year of junior eligibility, Samsonov represented Russia at the 2017 World Junior Ice Hockey Championships. After Russia fell to Team USA following a Troy Terry hat trick, the junior team won a bronze medal with a win over Sweden.

== Personal life ==
Samsonov married his girlfriend, Maria Semyonova, in 2019, and has one son.

== Career statistics ==
=== Regular season and playoffs ===
			Regular season									Playoffs
Season	Team	League	GP	W	L	T/OT	MIN	GA	SO	GAA	SV%	GP	W	L	MIN	GA	SO	GAA	SV%
2014–15	Stalnye Lisy	MHL	18	11	4	1	1,039	46	2	2.66	.908	2	1	1	127	6	0	2.83	.937
2014–15	Metallurg Magnitogorsk	KHL	1	0	0	0	21	2	0	5.50	.500	—	—	—	—	—	—	—	—
2015–16	Stalnye Lisy	MHL	5	5	0	0	300	9	1	1.80	.935	1	0	1	63	3	0	2.82	.875
2015–16	Metallurg Magnitogorsk	KHL	19	6	4	3	853	29	2	2.04	.925	6	2	2	263	10	0	2.28	.916
2016–17	Metallurg Magnitogorsk	KHL	27	15	3	5	1,127	40	2	2.13	.936	3	1	0	93	2	0	1.28	.949
2017–18	Metallurg Magnitogorsk	KHL	26	12	9	1	1,325	51	3	2.31	.926	5	1	2	234	9	0	2.30	.913
2018–19	Hershey Bears	AHL	37	20	14	2	2,202	99	3	2.70	.898	5	2	3	342	17	0	2.99	.897
2019–20	Washington Capitals	NHL	26	16	6	2	1,412	60	1	2.55	.913	—	—	—	—	—	—	—	—
2020–21	Washington Capitals	NHL	19	13	4	1	1,093	49	2	2.69	.902	3	0	3	201	10	0	2.99	.899
2020–21	Hershey Bears	AHL	4	2	1	1	240	13	0	3.25	.869	—	—	—	—	—	—	—	—
2021–22	Washington Capitals	NHL	44	23	12	5	2,361	119	3	3.02	.896	5	1	3	263	13	0	2.97	.912
2022–23	Toronto Maple Leafs	NHL	42	27	10	5	2,476	96	4	2.33	.919	9	4	4	499	26	0	3.13	.898
2023–24	Toronto Maple Leafs	NHL	40	23	7	8	2,301	120	3	3.13	.890	5	1	4	279	14	0	3.01	.896
2024–25	Vegas Golden Knights	NHL	29	16	9	4	1,745	82	2	2.82	.891	—	—	—	—	—	—	—	—
2025–26	HC Sochi	KHL	14	3	8	0	643	35	1	3.27	.903	—	—	—	—	—	—	—	—
KHL totals			87	36	24	9	3,970	157	8	2.37	.924	14	4	4	590	21	0	2.13	.920
NHL totals			200	118	48	25	11,387	526	15	2.77	.902	22	6	14	1,241	63	0	3.05	.901

=== International ===
Medal record

Representing Russia

Ice hockey

World Junior Championships
Silver medal – second place	2016 Finland	
Bronze medal – third place	2017 Canada	

Year	Team	Event	Result	GP	W	L	T	MIN	GA	SO	GAA	SV%
2014	Russia	U17	3rd place, bronze medalist(s)	3	1	2	0	179	17	0	5.71	.887
2015	Russia	U18	5th	3	2	1	0	180	8	0	2.67	.934
2016	Russia	WJC	2nd place, silver medalist(s)	2	2	0	0	120	2	0	1.00	.956
2017	Russia	WJC	3rd place, bronze medalist(s)	6	3	3	0	370	13	2	2.11	.930
Junior totals				14	8	6	0	849	40	2	2.87	.927

== Awards and honors ==
Award	Year	Ref
KHL
Gagarin Cup champion	2016	
International
WJC18 Best Goaltender	2015	
WJC All-Star Team	2016	

Awards and achievements
Preceded by Jakub Vrána	Washington Capitals first-round draft pick 2015	Succeeded by Lucas Johansen
