= Adam Klapka =

Czech ice hockey player (born 2000)

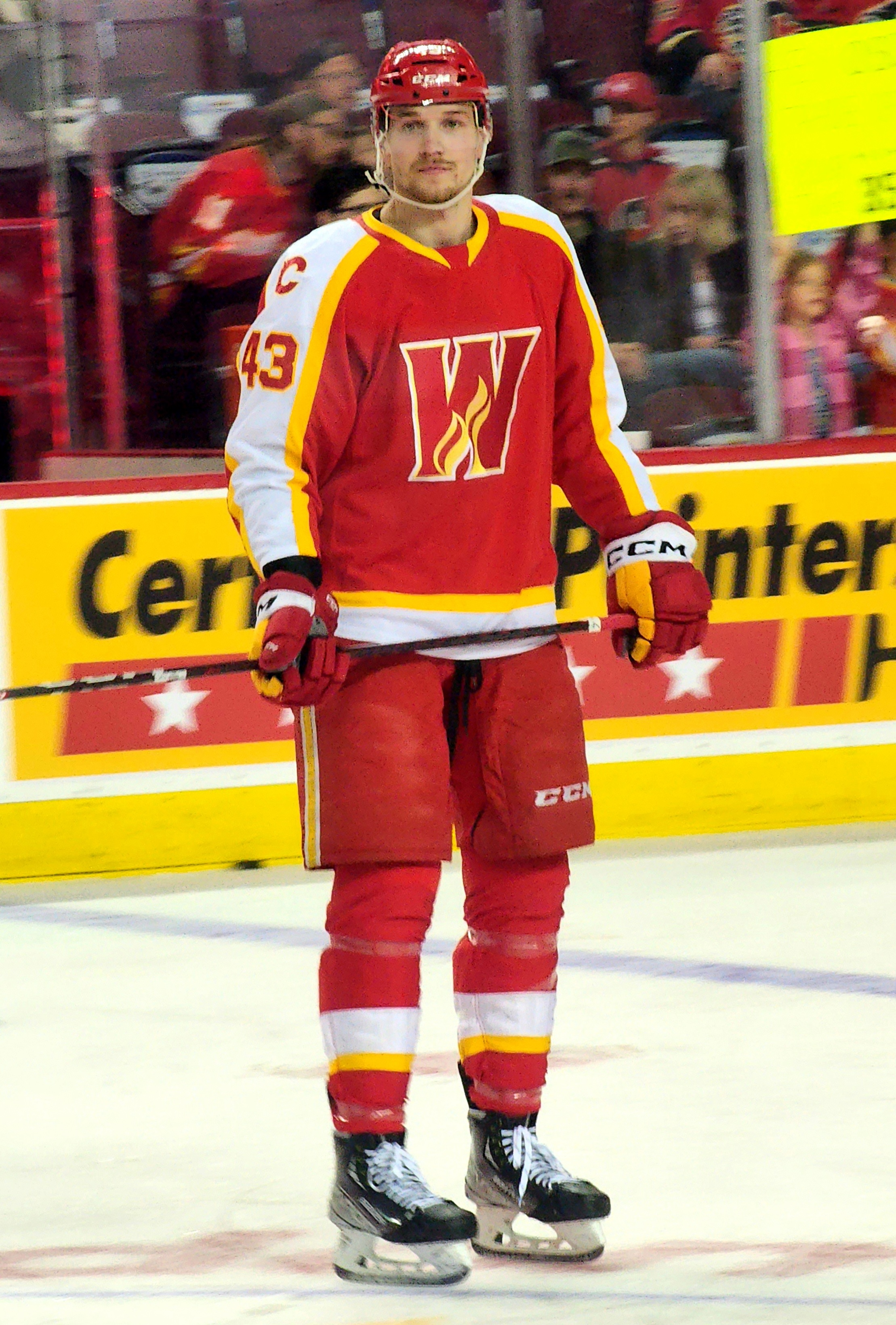
- Klapka with the Calgary Wranglers in 2023
- Born: 14 September 2000 (age 26) Prague, Czech Republic
- Height: 6 ft 8 in (203 cm)
- Weight: 236 lb (107 kg; 16 st 12 lb)
- Position: Right wing
- Shoots: Right
- NHL team: Calgary Flames
- NHL draft: Undrafted
- Playing career: 2021–present

Adam Klapka (born 14 September 2000) is a Czech professional ice hockey player who is a right winger for the Calgary Flames of the National Hockey League (NHL).

== Playing career ==
=== Junior ===
Klapka played two seasons of junior hockey with the Tri-City Storm of the USHL, where he was noted as a tough physical presence, and was regarded as having a goal-scoring touch.

=== Professional ===
Klapka began his professional career with the HC Bílí Tygři Liberec of the Czech Extraliga. He played one season with the club, splitting time between Tygři and their farm team, HC Benátky nad Jizerou of the Chance Liga.

On 16 May 2022, the Calgary Flames signed Klapka to a two-year, entry-level contract. Klapka impressed during the Flames training camp and pre-season games, being one of the last players cut, and was called the best prospect at the Flames pre-season rookie camp. Klapka was assigned to the Flames top affiliate, the Calgary Wranglers of the AHL for the 2022–23 season. Klapka would initially struggle to score in the American League, only scoring three goals in the first half of the season, and spending most of his time on the fourth line. However, Klapka would find his scoring touch towards the end of the season, scoring 10 goals in the final 26 games of the regular season, including his first career hat trick in the Wranglers home-ice finale. Klapka's impressive performance towards the end of his rookie season continued into the 2023 Calder Cup playoffs, where he would score the series-clinching goal in the second round to eliminate the Abbotsford Canucks.

On 18 January 2024, Klapka would be recalled to the Flames, making his NHL debut on 21 January, against the Edmonton Oilers. Klapka appeared in four games with the team before being reassigned to the Wranglers on 27 January. Later in the season, on 15 April, Klapka would again be recalled to the Flames for the final two games of the season, scoring his first goal during the season finale against the San Jose Sharks on 18 April.

On 12 August, Klapka signed a one-year, two-way contract extension with the Flames, worth US$775,000 at the NHL level.

On 10 June 2025, the Flames signed Klapka to a two-year, $2.5 million contract extension.

== Playing style ==
Klapka is regarded for his impressive stature, standing at 6 feet 8 inches (2.03 m) and weighing in at 236 pounds (107 kg), potentially the largest player to ever play in the USHL. Due to this, he has been noted as a significant physical presence in games, but also as having a goal scorers touch.

== Career statistics ==
			Regular season					Playoffs
Season	Team	League	GP	G	A	Pts	PIM	GP	G	A	Pts	PIM
2017–18	HC Slavia Praha	Czech.20	3	0	2	2	0	—	—	—	—	—
2018–19	HC Benátky nad Jizerou	Czech.1	22	4	2	6	12	—	—	—	—	—
2019–20	HC Benátky nad Jizerou	Czech.1	30	5	1	6	32	—	—	—	—	—
2019–20	Tri-City Storm	USHL	8	3	1	4	22	—	—	—	—	—
2020–21	Tri-City Storm	USHL	49	12	9	21	73	3	0	2	2	2
2021–22	HC Bílí Tygři Liberec	ELH	44	6	12	18	72	10	1	3	4	2
2021–22	HC Benátky nad Jizerou	Czech.1	16	7	5	12	45	—	—	—	—	—
2022–23	Calgary Wranglers	AHL	60	13	12	25	80	9	4	0	4	4
2023–24	Calgary Wranglers	AHL	65	21	25	46	90	6	2	5	7	10
2023–24	Calgary Flames	NHL	6	1	0	1	19	—	—	—	—	—
2024–25	Calgary Flames	NHL	31	6	4	10	29	—	—	—	—	—
2024–25	Calgary Wranglers	AHL	33	14	12	26	50	1	0	0	0	0
2025–26	Calgary Flames	NHL	79	6	12	18	112	—	—	—	—	—
NHL totals			116	13	16	29	160	—	—	—	—	—

=== International ===
Year	Team	Event	Result	GP	G	A	Pts	PIM
2025	Czechia	WC	6th	5	2	1	3	2
Senior totals				5	2	1	3	2
