= Carsen Twarynski =

Canadian ice hockey player (born 1997)

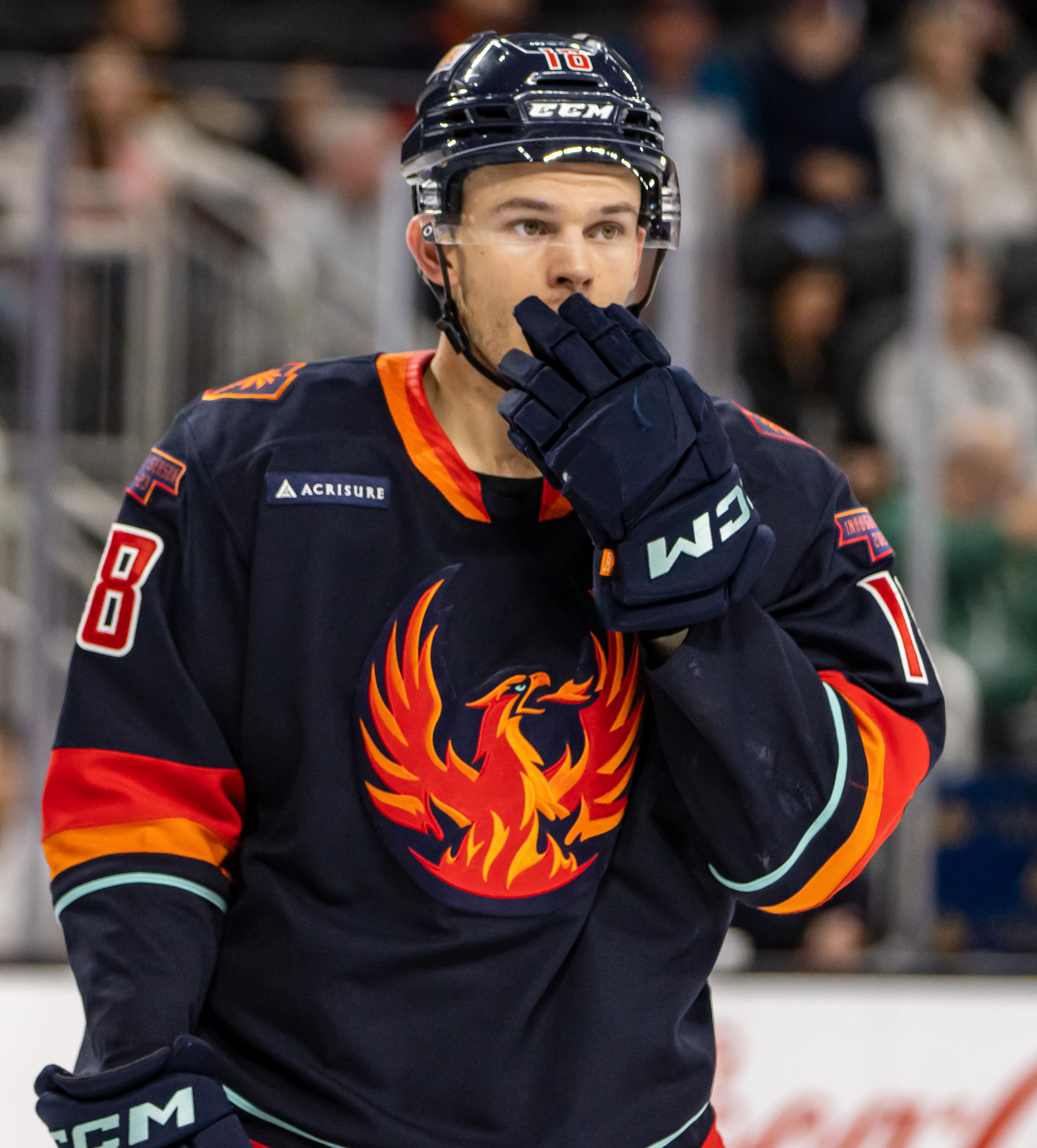
- Twarynski with the Coachella Valley Firebirds in 2023
- Born: November 24, 1997 (age 28) St. Albert, Alberta, Canada
- Height: 6 ft 2 in (188 cm)
- Weight: 198 lb (90 kg; 14 st 2 lb)
- Position: Left wing
- Shoots: Left
- EIHL team Former teams: Belfast Giants; San Diego Gulls; Philadelphia Flyers; Vienna Capitals
- NHL draft: 82nd overall, 2016; Philadelphia Flyers
- Playing career: 2018–present

Carsen Twarynski (born November 24, 1997) is a Canadian professional ice hockey left winger for the Belfast Giants of the Elite Ice Hockey League (EIHL). He was drafted in the third round, 82nd overall, by the Philadelphia Flyers in the 2016 NHL entry draft.

== Early life ==
Twarynski was born on November 24, 1997, in St. Albert, Alberta, Canada. His older brother Brayden was also an athlete; he most recently played as a linebacker for the Saskatchewan Huskies.

== Playing career ==
=== Junior ===
Growing up in Alberta, Twarynski played with Calgary's Bow Valley Hockey Association until he reached Atom level, in which he transferred to the Blackfoot Chiefs Minor Hockey Association Pee-Wee team for two years. As he aged out of pee-wee level, he competed with the Calgary Bantam AAA Blackhawks and the Calgary Bantam AAA Bisons of the Calgary Buffalo Hockey Associations. After going overlooked in the WHL bantam draft, he played one season with the Okotoks Oilers in the Alberta Junior Hockey League (AJHL) and Calgary Buffaloes in the Alberta Midget Hockey League (AMHL) before signing with the Calgary Hitmen of the Western Hockey League (WHL) as a 16-year-old. Twarynski recorded his first WHL goal during a 9–2 win over the Lethbridge Hurricanes on September 29, 2014. During his first year of draft eligibility, Twarynski recorded 20 goals for a total of 45 points and described himself as a "power forward that is good two ways." As a result of his play, he was drafted by the Philadelphia Flyers with the 82nd overall pick in the 2016 NHL entry draft.

After spending two seasons with the Hitmen, Twarynski was traded to the Kelowna Rockets in exchange for Jake Kryski on January 9, 2017. When reflecting on the trade, Twarynski said, "it was a good move. I was very happy and I think Kelowna has turned out the best, so I was very fortunate." Upon the conclusion of the season, Twarynski joined the Flyers' American Hockey League (AHL) affiliate, the Lehigh Valley Phantoms, but was returned to major junior ice hockey near the start of the 2017–18 season. On March 11, 2018, Twarynski concluded his major junior career by signing an entry-level contract with the Flyers.

=== Professional ===
After attending the Flyers' 2018–19 training camp, Twarynski was re-assigned to the Phantoms to start the season. He made his NHL debut on October 4, 2019, which was played in Prague, Czech Republic, as part of the NHL Global Series. Although he played the majority of the 2019–20 season with the Phantoms, Twarynski was included in the Flyers' training camp for the 2020 Stanley Cup playoffs, but he did not make the roster.

On July 21, 2021, Twarynski was selected from the Flyers in the 2021 NHL expansion draft by the Seattle Kraken.

As a free agent at the conclusion of his contract with the Kraken, Twarynski was unable to attract a contract to remain in North America. On September 27, 2023, Twarynski signed his first contract abroad in agreeing to a deal with Austrian club, the Vienna Capitals of the ICE Hockey League. He began the 2023–24 season with the Capitals in adding six goals and 13 points through 27 regular season games. He left Austria through the mid-point of the season after securing a contract in a return to the AHL with the Bridgeport Islanders, the primary affiliate to the New York Islanders, on January 8, 2024.

As a free agent at the conclusion of his contract with Bridgeport, Twarynski was signed to a one-year contract to continue in the AHL with the Abbotsford Canucks for the 2024–25 season on July 24, 2024. He made 26 regular season appearances with the Canucks, registering 2 goals and 7 points, before he was traded to fellow Pacific divisional club, the San Diego Gulls on March 11, 2025.

== Career statistics ==
			Regular season					Playoffs
Season	Team	League	GP	G	A	Pts	PIM	GP	G	A	Pts	PIM
2013–14	Calgary Buffaloes	AMHL	32	13	16	29	31	—	—	—	—	—
2013–14	Okotoks Oilers	AJHL	2	0	0	0	0	—	—	—	—	—
2014–15	Calgary Hitmen	WHL	58	6	16	22	22	16	1	4	5	14
2015–16	Calgary Hitmen	WHL	67	20	25	45	42	5	0	1	1	0
2016–17	Calgary Hitmen	WHL	36	10	11	21	42	—	—	—	—	—
2016–17	Kelowna Rockets	WHL	28	7	15	22	18	16	3	2	5	17
2017–18	Kelowna Rockets	WHL	68	45	27	72	87	4	2	2	4	4
2017–18	Lehigh Valley Phantoms	AHL	5	1	1	2	0	2	0	0	0	0
2018–19	Lehigh Valley Phantoms	AHL	69	10	14	24	50	—	—	—	—	—
2019–20	Philadelphia Flyers	NHL	15	1	0	1	4	—	—	—	—	—
2019–20	Lehigh Valley Phantoms	AHL	31	7	5	12	12	—	—	—	—	—
2020–21	Philadelphia Flyers	NHL	7	0	0	0	2	—	—	—	—	—
2020–21	Lehigh Valley Phantoms	AHL	2	0	0	0	0	—	—	—	—	—
2021–22	Charlotte Checkers	AHL	71	5	13	18	14	7	0	0	0	5
2022–23	Coachella Valley Firebirds	AHL	71	17	9	26	69	26	5	3	8	14
2023–24	Vienna Capitals	ICEHL	27	6	7	13	8	—	—	—	—	—
2023–24	Bridgeport Islanders	AHL	27	4	4	8	20	—	—	—	—	—
2024–25	Abbotsford Canucks	AHL	26	2	5	7	16	—	—	—	—	—
2024–25	San Diego Gulls	AHL	12	3	4	7	8	—	—	—	—	—
NHL totals			22	1	0	1	6	—	—	—	—	—
