= Lukáš Rousek =

Czech ice hockey player (born 1999)

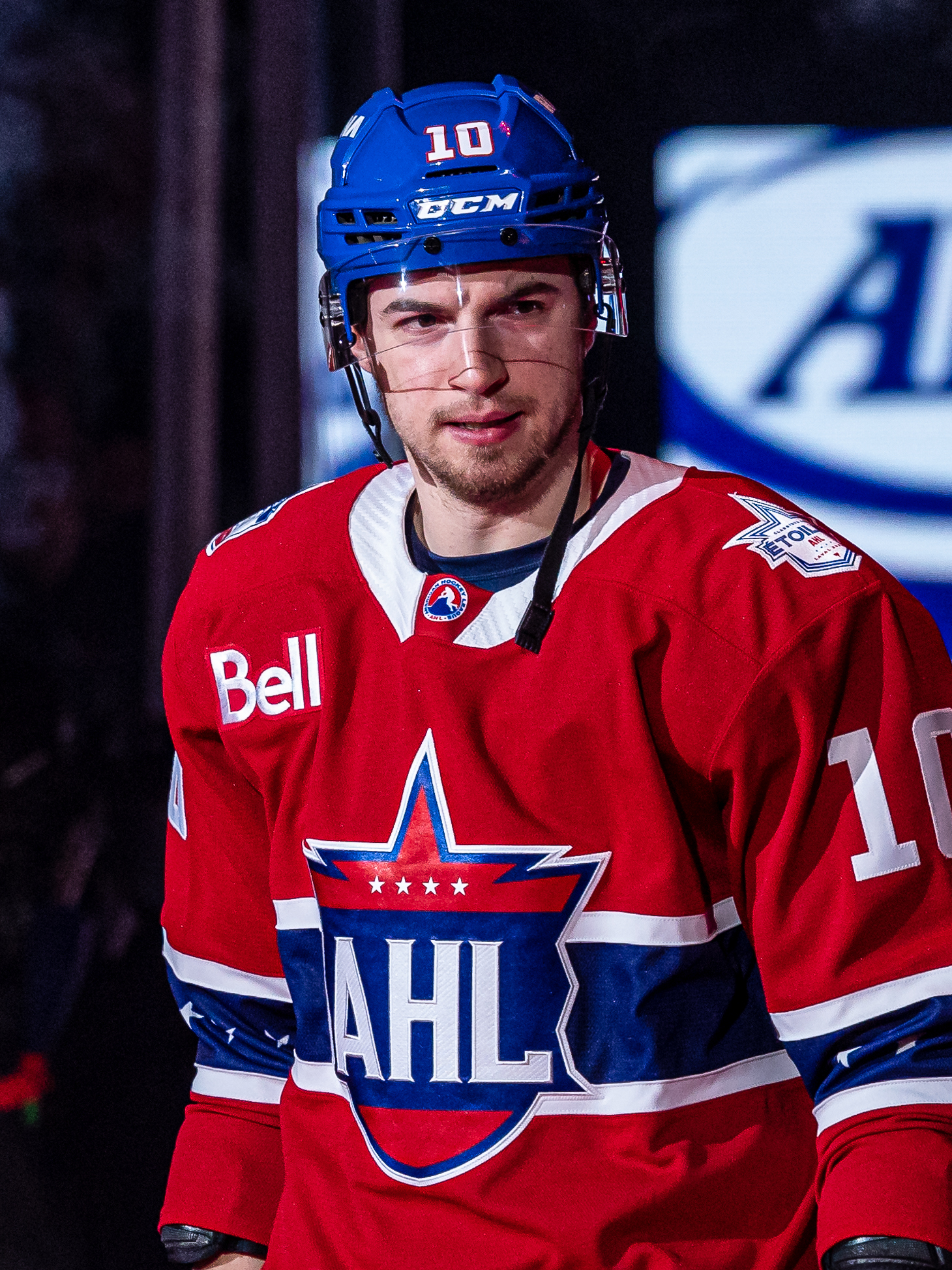
- Rousek at the 2023 AHL All-Star Classic
- Born: 20 April 1999 (age 27) Ostrov, Czech Republic
- Height: 5 ft 11 in (180 cm)
- Weight: 171 lb (78 kg; 12 st 3 lb)
- Position: Right wing
- Shoots: Left
- SHL team Former teams: HV71; HC Sparta Praha; Buffalo Sabres
- NHL draft: 160th overall, 2019; Buffalo Sabres
- Playing career: 2017–present

Lukáš Rousek (born 20 April 1999) is a Czech professional ice hockey right wing for HV71 of the Swedish Hockey League (SHL). He was selected in the sixth round (160th overall) of the 2019 NHL entry draft by the Sabres.

== Playing career ==
Rousek played for HC Sparta Praha in the Czech Extraliga, scoring a career-high 38 points in 49 games during the 2020–21 season.

After drafting Rousek in the 2019 NHL entry draft, the Buffalo Sabres signed Rousek to a two-year, entry-level contract on 20 April 2021.

During the 2022–23 season, Rousek made his NHL debut with the Sabres in a game on 27 March 2023, against the Montreal Canadiens. He scored his first NHL goal on his first shift, and added an assist later in the game. On 20 June 20, he was re-signed to a two-year contract with the Sabres.

On 27 May 2025, as a pending restricted free agent, Rousek left the Sabres organization and signed a two-year contract to return to Europe with HV71 of the Swedish Hockey League.

== Career statistics ==
			Regular season					Playoffs
Season	Team	League	GP	G	A	Pts	PIM	GP	G	A	Pts	PIM
2017–18	HC Sparta Praha	Czech.20	18	10	16	26	6	—	—	—	—	—
2017–18	HC Sparta Praha	ELH	26	0	2	2	0	—	—	—	—	—
2017–18	HC Stadion Litoměřice	Czech.1	1	0	0	0	0	—	—	—	—	—
2017–18	HC Letci Letňany	Czech.2	4	4	5	9	0	—	—	—	—	—
2018–19	HC Sparta Praha	ELH	34	4	5	9	4	4	2	3	5	0
2018–19	HC Stadion Litoměřice	Czech.1	16	7	8	15	4	—	—	—	—	—
2019–20	HC Sparta Praha	ELH	52	14	15	29	14	—	—	—	—	—
2020–21	HC Sparta Praha	ELH	49	14	24	38	8	11	2	5	7	0
2021–22	Rochester Americans	AHL	19	1	3	4	2	10	2	4	6	0
2022–23	Rochester Americans	AHL	70	16	40	56	24	14	5	7	12	0
2022–23	Buffalo Sabres	NHL	2	1	1	2	0	—	—	—	—	—
2023–24	Rochester Americans	AHL	51	10	31	41	16	5	0	6	6	10
2023–24	Buffalo Sabres	NHL	15	0	2	2	0	—	—	—	—	—
2024–25	Rochester Americans	AHL	72	7	35	42	44	7	2	6	8	2
2025–26	HV71	SHL	52	3	28	31	10	—	—	—	—	—
ELH totals			161	32	46	78	26	15	4	8	12	0
NHL totals			17	1	3	4	0	—	—	—	—	—
