= 2022 Calder Cup playoffs =

American Hockey League postseason tournament

Tournament details
- Dates: May 2 – June 25, 2022
- Teams: 23

Final positions
- Champions: Chicago Wolves
- Runners-up: Springfield Thunderbirds

Tournament statistics
- Scoring leader(s): Josh Leivo (Wolves) (29 points)

Awards
- MVP: Josh Leivo (Wolves)

The 2022 Calder Cup playoffs was the postseason tournament of the American Hockey League (AHL) to determine the winner of the Calder Cup, which is awarded to the AHL playoff champions.

2022 marked the return of postseason play for the AHL after two seasons of no playoffs due to the COVID-19 pandemic. The 2022 playoffs began on May 2, 2022, with a new 23-team playoff format. All but the bottom two teams of each division qualified for the playoffs. Each division had a best-of-three series in the first round to determine the top 16 teams for the division semifinals, with various teams receiving byes.

The 16 teams that remained—four from each division—played a best-of-five series in the division semifinals, with the playoffs continuing with another best-of-five series for the division finals and a best-of-seven series for the conference finals and Calder Cup finals.

== Playoff seeds ==
After the 2021–22 AHL regular season, 23 teams qualified for the playoffs. All but the bottom two teams in each division ranked by points percentage qualify for the 2022 Calder Cup playoffs. The Stockton Heat were the first team to clinch a playoff spot on March 19, while the Chicago Wolves won the regular season title on the final day of the regular season.

=== Eastern Conference ===
==== Atlantic Division ====
1. Charlotte Checkers – 90 points (.625), 36 RWs
2. Springfield Thunderbirds – 95 points (.625), 31 RWs
3. Providence Bruins – 83 points (.576)
4. Wilkes-Barre/Scranton Penguins – 78 points (.513), 26 RWs
5. Hershey Bears – 78 points (.513), 23 RWs
6. Bridgeport Islanders – 73 points (.507)

==== North Division ====
1. Utica Comets – 95 points (.660)
2. Syracuse Crunch – 91 points (.599)
3. Laval Rocket – 85 points (.590)
4. Belleville Senators – 84 points (.583)
5. Rochester Americans – 84 points (.553)

=== Western Conference ===
==== Central Division ====
1. Chicago Wolves – 110 points (.724)
2. Manitoba Moose – 89 points (.618)
3. Milwaukee Admirals – 87 points (.572)
4. Rockford IceHogs – 79 points (.549)
5. Texas Stars – 76 points (.528)

==== Pacific Division ====
1. Stockton Heat – 97 points (.714)
2. Ontario Reign – 91 points (.669)
3. Colorado Eagles – 85 points (.625)
4. Bakersfield Condors – 84 points (.618), 32 RWs
5. Abbotsford Canucks – 84 points (.618), 30 RWs
6. Henderson Silver Knights – 75 points (.551)
7. San Diego Gulls – 63 points (.463)

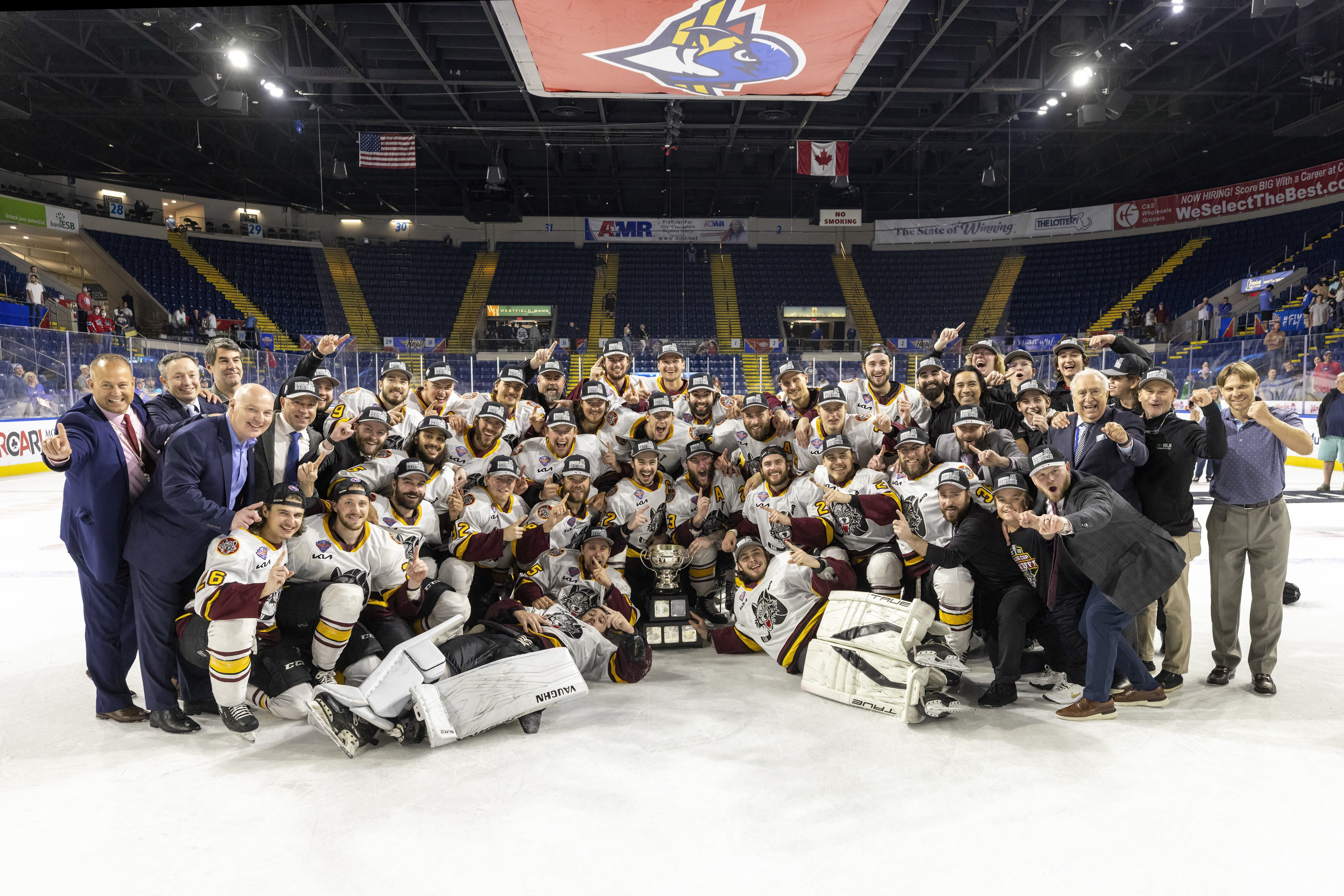
The champion Chicago Wolves

== Bracket ==
First round May 2–9
A3 | Providence | 0
A6 | Bridgeport | 2
A4 | Wilkes-Barre/Scranton | 2
A5 | Hershey | 1
N4 | Belleville | 0
N5 | Rochester | 2
C4 | Rockford | 2
C5 | Texas | 0
P4 | Bakersfield | 2
P5 | Abbotsford | 0
P2 | Ontario | 2
P7 | San Diego | 0
P3 | Colorado | 2
P6 | Henderson | 0

Division semifinals May 6–19
A1 | Charlotte | 3
A6 | Bridgeport | 1
Atlantic Division
A2 | Springfield | 3
A4 | Wilkes-Barre/Scranton | 0
N1 | Utica | 2
N5 | Rochester | 3
North Division
N2 | Syracuse | 2
N3 | Laval | 3
C1 | Chicago | 3
C4 | Rockford | 0
Central Division
C2 | Manitoba | 2
C3 | Milwaukee | 3
P1 | Stockton | 3
P4 | Bakersfield | 0
Pacific Division
P2 | Ontario | 0
P3 | Colorado | 3

Division finals May 21–29
A1 | Charlotte | 0
A2 | Springfield | 3
Eastern Conference
N5 | Rochester | 0
N3 | Laval | 3
C1 | Chicago | 3
C3 | Milwaukee | 1
Western Conference
P1 | Stockton | 3
P3 | Colorado | 1

Conference finals June 3–15
A2 | Springfield | 4
N3 | Laval | 3
C1 | Chicago | 4
P1 | Stockton | 2

Calder Cup finals June 19–25
A2 | Springfield | 1
C1 | Chicago | 4

== First round ==
=== Eastern Conference ===
==== (A3) Providence Bruins vs. (A6) Bridgeport Islanders ====
| May 2 | Bridgeport Islanders | 2–1 | OT | Providence Bruins | Dunkin' Donuts Center | Recap |
| No scoring | | First period | | No scoring |
| No scoring | | Second period | | 13:43 - pp - Jakub Lauko (1) |
| Grant Hutton (1) - 01:07 | | Third period | | No scoring |
| Arnaud Durandeau (1) - 09:56 | | First overtime period | | No scoring |
| Cory Schneider ( 46 saves / 47 shots ) | | Goalie stats | | Troy Grosenick ( 30 saves / 32 shots ) |

| May 4 | Providence Bruins | 1–2 | OT | Bridgeport Islanders | Total Mortgage Arena | Recap |
| No scoring | | First period | | No scoring |
| No scoring | | Second period | | No scoring |
| Nick Wolff (1) - 13:14 | | Third period | | 03:29 - pp - Michael Dal Colle (1) |
| No scoring | | First overtime period | | 12:53 - Aatu Raty (1) |
| Troy Grosenick ( 32 saves / 34 shots ) | | Goalie stats | | Cory Schneider ( 29 saves / 30 shots ) |

| Bridgeport won series 2–0 |

==== (A4) Wilkes-Barre/Scranton Penguins vs. (A5) Hershey Bears ====
| May 6 | Hershey Bears | 0–3 | Wilkes-Barre/Scranton Penguins | Mohegan Sun Arena at Casey Plaza | Recap |
| No scoring | | First period | 08:34 - Will Reilly (1); 09:05 - Alexander Nylander (1) |
| No scoring | | Second period | No scoring |
| No scoring | | Third period | 19:26 - pp, en - Radim Zohorna (1) |
| Pheonix Copley ( 28 saves / 30 shots ) | | Goalie stats | Tommy Nappier ( 23 saves / 23 shots ) |

| May 8 | Wilkes-Barre/Scranton Penguins | 1–2 | Hershey Bears | Giant Center | Recap |
| No scoring | | First period | 04:07 - pp - Beck Malenstyn (1) |
| Felix Robert (1) - 10:46 | | Second period | 10:16 - Dylan McIlrath (1) |
| No scoring | | Third period | No scoring |
| Tommy Nappier ( 30 saves / 32 shots ) | | Goalie stats | Pheonix Copley ( 22 saves / 23 shots ) |

| May 9 | Hershey Bears | 3–4 | OT | Wilkes-Barre/Scranton Penguins | Mohegan Sun Arena at Casey Plaza | Recap |
| Michael Sgarbossa (1) - 05:22 | | First period | | 17:38 - Matt Bartkowski (1) |
| No scoring | | Second period | | No scoring |
| Garrett Pilon (1) - 18:25; Brett Leason (1) - 19:07 | | Third period | | 04:44 - Radim Zohorna (2); 12:05 - Sam Poulin (1) |
| No scoring | | First overtime period | | 08:22 - Alexander Nylander (2) |
| Pheonix Copley ( 42 saves / 46 shots ) | | Goalie stats | | Tommy Nappier ( 34 saves / 37 shots ) |

| Wilkes-Barre/Scranton won series 2–1 |

==== (N4) Belleville Senators vs. (N5) Rochester Americans ====
| May 4 | Belleville Senators | 3–4 | OT | Rochester Americans | Blue Cross Arena | Recap |
| Cole Reinhardt (1) - 07:27; Dillon Heatherington (1) - 19:00 | | First period | | No scoring |
| Rourke Chartier (1) - 12:58 | | Second period | | No scoring |
| No scoring | | Third period | | 03:13 - Lukas Rousek (1); 13:19 - Jimmy Schuldt (1); 16:03 - Casey Fitzgerald (1) |
| No scoring | | First overtime period | | 16:54 - Arttu Ruotsalainen (1) |
| Filip Gustavsson ( 28 saves / 31 shots ) | | Goalie stats | | Aaron Dell ( 24 saves / 27 shots) |

| May 6 | Rochester Americans | 4–3 | OT | Belleville Senators | CAA Arena | Recap |
| Arttu Ruotsalainen (2) - pp - 06:47 | | First period | | No scoring |
| Mark Jankowski (1) - 05:41; Arttu Ruotsalainen (3) - 15:48 | | Second period | | 13:26 - Zac Leslie (1) |
| No scoring | | Third period | | 02:09 - Andrew Agozzino (1); 07:19 - pp - Roby Jarventie (1) |
| Brett Murray (1) - 17:39 | | First overtime period | | No scoring |
| Aaron Dell ( 34 saves / 37 shots) | | Goalie stats | | Filip Gustavsson ( 26 saves / 30 shots ) |

| Rochester won series 2–0 |

=== Western Conference ===
==== (C4) Rockford IceHogs vs. (C5) Texas Stars ====
| May 4 | Texas Stars | 1–2 | Rockford IceHogs | BMO Harris Bank Center | Recap |
| No scoring | | First period | No scoring |
| No scoring | | Second period | 06:53 - Lukas Reichel (1) |
| Fredrik Karlstrom (1) - 04:53 | | Third period | 04:06 - Carson Gicewicz (1) |
| Matt Murray ( 28 saves / 30 shots ) | | Goalie stats | Arvid Soderblom ( 33 saves / 34 shots ) |

| May 6 | Texas Stars | 0–1 | OT | Rockford IceHogs | BMO Harris Bank Center | Recap |
| No scoring | | First period | | No scoring |
| No scoring | | Second period | | No scoring |
| No scoring | | Third period | | No scoring |
| No scoring | | First overtime period | | 00:56 - Dylan McLaughlin (1) |
| Matt Murray ( 31 saves / 32 shots ) | | Goalie stats | | Arvid Soderblom ( 36 saves / 36 shots ) |

| Rockford won series 2–0 |

==== (P2) Ontario Reign vs. (P7) San Diego Gulls ====
| May 4 | San Diego Gulls | 4–7 | Ontario Reign | Toyota Arena | Recap |
| Josh Lopina (1) - 00:11; Hunter Drew (1) - 07:47 | | First period | 10:26 - Samuel Fagemo (1); 14:00 - sh - Austin Wagner (1); 18:59 - pp - Samuel Fagemo (2) |
| No scoring | | Second period | 16:03 - pp - Vladimir Tkachev (1) |
| Trevor Carrick (1) - 03:18; Alex Limoges (1) - 19:23 | | Third period | 05:32 - Akil Thomas (1); 07:40 - Martin Frk (1); 18:32 - sh - en - Akil Thomas (2) |
| Lukas Dostal ( 22 saves / 28 shots ) Olle Eriksson Ek ( 10 saves / 10 shots ) | | Goalie stats | Matt Villalta ( 22 saves / 26 shots ) |

| May 5 | San Diego Gulls | 2–3 | OT | Ontario Reign | Toyota Arena | Recap |
| No scoring | | First period | | 04:09 - Akil Thomas (3); 05:24 - Christian Wolanin (1) |
| Greg Printz (1) - sh - 08:24; Brent Gates (1) - pp - 19:54 | | Second period | | No scoring |
| No scoring | | Third period | | No scoring |
| No scoring | | First overtime period | | 02:31 - pp - T. J. Tynan (1) |
| Lukas Dostal ( 29 saves / 32 shots ) | | Goalie stats | | Matt Villalta ( 25 saves / 27 shots ) |

| Ontario won series 2–0 |

==== (P3) Colorado Eagles vs. (P6) Henderson Silver Knights ====
| May 4 | Henderson Silver Knights | 2–5 | Colorado Eagles | Budweiser Events Center | Recap |
| No scoring | | First period | 00:31 - Jayson Megna (1); 16:55 - sh - Jayson Megna (2) |
| No scoring | | Second period | No scoring |
| Paul Cotter (1) - 03:02; Sven Bartschi (1) - 08:21 | | Third period | 05:02 - Jean-Luc Foudy (1); 18:29 - en - Mikhail Maltsev (1); 19:52 - en - Kiefer Sherwood (1) |
| Jiri Patera ( 33 saves / 36 shots ) | | Goalie stats | Justus Annunen ( 22 saves / 24 shots ) |

| May 6 | Henderson Silver Knights | 2–5 | Colorado Eagles | Budweiser Events Center | Recap |
| No scoring | | First period | 08:22 - Stefan Matteau (1); 13:20 - pp - Martin Kaut (1) |
| Pavel Dorofeyev (1) - 06:21 | | Second period | No scoring |
| Layton Ahac (1) - 14:22 | | Third period | 01:59 - pp - Alex Beaucage (1); 10:50 - Jean-Luc Foudy (2); 17:28 - en - Ryan Wagner (1) |
| Jiri Patera ( 29 saves / 33 shots ) | | Goalie stats | Justus Annunen ( 34 saves / 36 shots ) |

| Colorado won series 2–0 |

==== (P4) Bakersfield Condors vs. (P5) Abbotsford Canucks ====
| May 3 | Abbotsford Canucks | 1–2 | OT | Bakersfield Condors | Mechanics Bank Arena | Recap |
| No scoring | | First period | | No scoring |
| No scoring | | Second period | | No scoring |
| Vasily Podkolzin (1) - 10:29 | | Third period | | 19:30 - Seth Griffith (1) |
| No scoring | | First overtime period | | 06:39 - pp - James Hamblin (1) |
| Spencer Martin ( 45 saves / 47 shots ) | | Goalie stats | | Stuart Skinner ( 30 saves / 31 shots ) |

| May 4 | Abbotsford Canucks | 2–3 | Bakersfield Condors | Mechanics Bank Arena | Recap |
| Sheldon Dries (1) - pp - 15:54 | | First period | No scoring |
| No scoring | | Second period | 18:51 - Adam Cracknell (1) |
| Sheldon Rempal (1) - 12:51 | | Third period | 04:39 - Brad Malone (1); 18:38 - Cooper Marody (1) |
| Spencer Martin ( 30 saves / 33 shots ) | | Goalie stats | Stuart Skinner ( 27 saves / 29 shots ) |

| Bakersfield won series 2–0 |

== Division semifinals ==
=== Eastern Conference ===
==== (A1) Charlotte Checkers vs. (A6) Bridgeport Islanders ====
| May 10 | Charlotte Checkers | 3–2 | Bridgeport Islanders | Total Mortgage Arena | Recap |
| No scoring | | First period | 05:46 - Austin Czarnik (1); 12:36 - Austin Czarnik (2) |
| Alexander True (1) - pp - 06:59; Alexander True (2) - 15:04 | | Second period | No scoring |
| Gustav Olofsson (1) - 16:40 | | Third period | No scoring |
| Joey Daccord ( 25 saves / 27 shots ) | | Goalie stats | Cory Schneider ( 22 saves / 25 shots ) |

| May 12 | Charlotte Checkers | 7–6 | 2OT | Bridgeport Islanders | Total Mortgage Arena | Recap |
| Zac Dalpe (1) - 00:53; Matt Kiersted (1) - 04:09; Serron Noel (1) - 11:23; Cole Schwindt (1) - sh - 12:49; Zac Dalpe (2) - pp - 17:39 | | First period | | 15:11 - Simon Holmstrom (1); 15:27 - Michael Dal Colle (2); 16:04 - sh - Kyle MacLean (1) |
| No scoring | | Second period | | 01:17 - Austin Czarnik (3); 18:20 - Chris Terry (1) |
| Connor Bunnaman (1) - 03:07 | | Third period | | 08:39 - pp - Robin Salo (1) |
| Zac Dalpe (3) - 03:36 | | Second overtime period | | No scoring |
| Joey Daccord ( 29 saves / 35 shots ) | | Goalie stats | | Cory Schneider ( 5 saves / 9 shots ) Jakub Škarek ( 31 saves / 34 shots ) |

| May 14 | Bridgeport Islanders | 3–2 | Charlotte Checkers | Bojangles Coliseum | Recap |
| No scoring | | First period | No scoring |
| Chris Terry (2) - 12:02 | | Second period | 10:08 - Aleksi Heponiemi (1) |
| Simon Holmstrom (2) - 15:23; Simon Holmstrom (3) - en - 19:03 | | Third period | 19:22 - Zac Dalpe (4) |
| Cory Schneider ( 32 saves / 34 shots ) | | Goalie stats | Joey Daccord ( 20 saves / 22 shots ) |

| May 16 | Bridgeport Islanders | 0–4 | Charlotte Checkers | Bojangles Coliseum | Recap |
| No scoring | | First period | 01:01 - Max McCormick (1); 18:21 - Zac Dalpe (5) |
| No scoring | | Second period | No scoring |
| No scoring | | Third period | 16:55 - en - Max McCormick (2); 18:33 - en - Max McCormick (3) |
| Cory Schneider ( 30 saves / 32 shots ) | | Goalie stats | Joey Daccord ( 23 saves / 23 shots ) |

| Charlotte won series 3–1 |

==== (A2) Springfield Thunderbirds vs. (A4) Wilkes-Barre/Scranton Penguins ====
| May 11 | Wilkes-Barre/Scranton Penguins | 1–4 | Springfield Thunderbirds | MassMutual Center | Recap |
| No scoring | | First period | 13:27 - pp - William Bitten (1) |
| Felix Robert (2) - 10:30 | | Second period | 14:23 - Klim Kostin (1) |
| No scoring | | Third period | 8:28 - Sam Anas (1); 17:22 - en - Dakota Joshua (1) |
| Tommy Nappier ( 23 saves / 26 shots ) | | Goalie stats | Charlie Lindgren ( 50 saves / 51 shots ) |

| May 12 | Wilkes-Barre/Scranton Penguins | 2–6 | Springfield Thunderbirds | MassMutual Center | Recap |
| No scoring | | First period | 18:13 - pp - Matthew Peca (1) |
| Will Reilly (2) - 04:56; Pierre-Olivier Joseph (1) - 10:34 | | Second period | 16:57 - pp - Tommy Cross (1); 17:39 - Mackenzie MacEachern (1) |
| No scoring | | Third period | 10:49 - Nikita Alexandrov (1); 16:12 - en - Joel Hofer (1); 18:01 - sh - en - Luke Witkowski (1) |
| Tommy Nappier ( 32 saves / 36 shots ) | | Goalie stats | Joel Hofer ( 34 saves / 36 shots ) |

| May 15 | Springfield Thunderbirds | 7–6 | Wilkes-Barre/Scranton Penguins | Mohegan Sun Arena at Casey Plaza | Recap |
| Sam Anas (2) - pp - 08:27 | | First period | 02:45 - Jonathan Gruden (1); 10:22 - Filip Hallander (1); 14:31 - pp - Sam Poulin (2); 16:41 - Nathan Legace (1) |
| William Bitten (2) - pp - 10:36; Steven Santini (1) - 12:59; Dakota Joshua (2) - 17:15 | | Second period | No scoring |
| Matthew Peca (2) - 05:00; Mackenzie MacEachern (2) - 07:25; Hugh McGing (1) - pp - 11:15 | | Third period | 08:54 - pp - Sam Poulin (2); 12:34 - Alexander Nylander (3) |
| Charlie Lindgren ( 26 saves / 32 shots ) | | Goalie stats | Tommy Nappier ( 37 saves / 44 shots ) |

| Springfield won series 3–0 |

==== (N1) Utica Comets vs. (N5) Rochester Americans ====
| May 10 | Rochester Americans | 3–6 | Utica Comets | Adirondack Bank Center | Recap |
| Arttu Ruotsalainen (4) - 02:21; JJ Peterka (1) - pp - 06:03 | | First period | No scoring |
| Arttu Ruotsalainen (5) - 11:37 | | Second period | 04:31 - Tyce Thompson (1); 05:30 - Robbie Russo (1); 15:53 - pp - Ryan Schmelzer (1) |
| No scoring | | Third period | 09:29 - Joe Gambardella (1); 14:04 - A. J. Greer (1); 16:30 - A. J. Greer (2) |
| Aaron Dell ( 34 saves / 40 shots ) | | Goalie stats | Nico Daws ( 22 saves / 25 shots ) |

| May 14 | Rochester Americans | 4–3 | OT | Utica Comets | Adirondack Bank Center | Recap |
| Mark Jankowski (2) - 00:20; JJ Peterka (2) - 10:44 | | First period | | 15:25 - pp - A. J. Greer (3) |
| JJ Peterka (3) - 12:12 | | Second period | | 03:28 - Robbie Russo (2) |
| No scoring | | Third period | | 01:32 - Brian Flynn (1) |
| JJ Peterka (4) - 01:29 | | First overtime period | | No scoring |
| Aaron Dell ( 16 saves / 19 shots ) | | Goalie stats | | Nico Daws ( 25 saves / 29 shots ) |

| May 15 | Utica Comets | 3–4 | OT | Rochester Americans | Blue Cross Arena | Recap |
| A. J. Greer (4) - 07:34 | | First period | | 14:34 - Sean Malone (1); 16:45 - Lukas Rousek (2) |
| Fabian Zetterlund (1) - pp - 09:32; Aarne Talvitie (1) - 18:00 | | Second period | | 15:22 - Brandon Biro (1) |
| No scoring | | Third period | | No scoring |
| No scoring | | First overtime period | | 01:39 - pp - Arttu Ruotsalainen (6) |
| Akira Schmid ( 34 saves / 38 shots ) | | Goalie stats | | Aaron Dell ( 30 saves / 33 shots ) |

| May 17 | Utica Comets | 4–2 | Rochester Americans | Blue Cross Arena | Recap |
| Nolan Foote (1) - 06:53 | | First period | No scoring |
| A. J. Greer (5) - 08:46; A. J. Greer (6) - 16:50; Chase De Leo (1) - pp - 18:22 | | Second period | No scoring |
| No scoring | | Third period | 15:47 - pp - Arttu Ruotsalainen (7); 19:10 - pp - Mark Jankowski (3) |
| Nico Daws ( 30 saves / 32 shots ) | | Goalie stats | Aaron Dell ( 22 saves / 26 shots ) Michael Houser ( 7 saves / 7 shots ) |

| May 19 | Rochester Americans | 4–2 | Utica Comets | Adirondack Bank Center | Recap |
| Casey Fitzgerald (2) - 09:10 | | First period | 10:32 - Fabian Zetterlund (2); 11:21 - Alexander Holtz (1) |
| No scoring | | Second period | No scoring |
| Arttu Ruotsalainen (8) - pp - 03:21; Sean Malone (2) - 06:45; Mark Jankowski (4) - en - 18:59 | | Third period | No scoring |
| Aaron Dell ( 19 saves / 21 shots ) | | Goalie stats | Nico Daws ( 24 saves / 27 shots ) |

| Rochester won series 3–2 |

==== (N2) Syracuse Crunch vs. (N3) Laval Rocket ====
| May 6 | Laval Rocket | 3–5 | Syracuse Crunch | Upstate Medical University Arena | Recap |
| Alex Belzile (1) - pp - 04:11 | | First period | 05:54 - Remi Elie (1); 18:43 - pp - Cole Koepke (1) |
| Joel Teasdale (1) - 15:19 | | Second period | 01:08 - Anthony Richard (1); 18:11 - pp - Gemel Smith (1) |
| Alex Belzile (2) - 06:28 | | Third period | 19:38 - en - Anthony Richard (2) |
| Kevin Poulin ( 26 saves / 30 shots ) | | Goalie stats | Maxime Lagace ( 28 saves / 31 shots ) |

| May 7 | Laval Rocket | 3–2 | Syracuse Crunch | Upstate Medical University Arena | Recap |
| Jesse Ylonen (1) - pp - 17:33 | | First period | 05:37 - Simon Ryfors (1) |
| Alex Belzile (3) - 06:27 | | Second period | No scoring |
| Brandon Gignac (1) - 18:13 | | Third period | 12:40 - Daniel Walcott (1) |
| Cayden Primeau ( 37 saves / 39 shots ) | | Goalie stats | Maxime Lagace ( 25 saves / 28 shots ) |

| May 12 | Syracuse Crunch | 1–4 | Laval Rocket | Place Bell | Recap |
| No scoring | | First period | 02:43 - pp - Danick Martel (1) |
| Remi Elie (2) - 04:49 | | Second period | No scoring |
| No scoring | | Third period | 08:49 - pp - Cedric Paquette (1); 18:18 - en - Jean-Sebastien Dea (1); 19:40 - en - Louie Belpedio (1) |
| Maxime Lagace ( 23 saves / 25 shots ) | | Goalie stats | Cayden Primeau ( 22 saves / 23 shots ) |

| May 14 | Syracuse Crunch | 3–0 | Laval Rocket | Place Bell | Recap |
| Cole Koepke (2) - 05:35 | | First period | No scoring |
| No scoring | | Second period | No scoring |
| Remi Elie (3) - pp - 02:13; Anthony Richard (3) - 06:24 | | Third period | No scoring |
| Maxime Lagace ( 4 saves / 4 shots ) Hugo Alnefelt ( 24 saves / 24 shots ) | | Goalie stats | Cayden Primeau ( 34 saves / 37 shots ) |

| May 17 | Laval Rocket | 3–2 | OT | Syracuse Crunch | Upstate Medical University Arena | Recap |
| No scoring | | First period | | 15:31 - sh - Anthony Richard (4) |
| Alex Belzile (4) - pp - 11:24 | | Second period | | 07:16 - Ryan Jones (1) |
| Cedric Paquette (2) - 19:21 | | Third period | | No scoring |
| Gabriel Bourque (1) - 10:13 | | First overtime period | | No scoring |
| Cayden Primeau ( 32 saves / 34 shots ) | | Goalie stats | | Maxime Lagace ( 33 saves / 36 shots ) |

| Laval won series 3–2 |

=== Western Conference ===
==== (C1) Chicago Wolves vs. (C4) Rockford IceHogs ====
| May 12 | Rockford IceHogs | 2–6 | Chicago Wolves | Allstate Arena | Recap |
| Lukas Reichel (2) - 06:16 | | First period | 19:04 - Cavan Fitzgerald (1); 19:50 - pp - Stefan Noesen (1) |
| No scoring | | Second period | 03:56 - Stelio Mattheos (1); 07:32 - pp - Jack Drury (1); 13:47 - Dave Gust (1) |
| Evan Barratt (1) - 07:21 | | Third period | 00:36 - Stefan Noesen (2) |
| Arvid Soderblom ( 22 saves / 27 shots ) Cale Morris ( 10 saves / 11 shots ) | | Goalie stats | Alex Lyon ( 18 saves / 20 shots ) |

| May 14 | Rockford IceHogs | 1–4 | Chicago Wolves | Allstate Arena | Recap |
| No scoring | | First period | 16:52 - Josh Leivo (1); 18:42 - C. J. Smith (1) |
| Alec Regula (1) - pp - 13:19 | | Second period | 11:51 - Maxime Lajoie (1) |
| No scoring | | Third period | 13:54 - Vasili Ponomaryov (1) |
| Arvid Soderblom ( 45 saves / 49 shots ) | | Goalie stats | Alex Lyon ( 15 saves / 16 shots ) |

| May 15 | Chicago Wolves | 4–1 | Rockford IceHogs | BMO Harris Bank Center | Recap |
| Ivan Lodnia (1) - 02:27 | | First period | No scoring |
| C. J. Smith (2) - 16:57 | | Second period | No scoring |
| Jack Drury (2) - pp - 01:12; Andrew Poturalski (1) - pp - 16:49 | | Third period | 12:57 - pp - Ian Mitchell (1) |
| Alex Lyon ( 29 saves / 30 shots ) | | Goalie stats | Arvid Soderblom ( 36 saves / 40 shots ) |

| Chicago won series 3–0 |

==== (C2) Manitoba Moose vs. (C3) Milwaukee Admirals ====
| May 6 | Manitoba Moose | 2–3 | Milwaukee Admirals | UW–Milwaukee Panther Arena | Recap |
| No scoring | | First period | No scoring |
| C. J. Suess (1) - 17:12 | | Second period | 15:39 - Brayden Burke (1); 19:59 - pp - Matt Donovan (1) |
| Declan Chisholm (1) - 00:46 | | Third period | 15:53 - Cole Schneider (1) |
| Mikhail Berdin ( 18 saves / 21 shots ) | | Goalie stats | Devin Cooley ( 40 saves / 42 shots ) |

| May 7 | Manitoba Moose | 1–2 | Milwaukee Admirals | UW–Milwaukee Panther Arena | Recap |
| No scoring | | First period | No scoring |
| No scoring | | Second period | No scoring |
| Morgan Barron (1) - 18:31 | | Third period | 02:10 - Brayden Burke (2); 19:14 - Jimmy Huntington (1) |
| Mikhail Berdin ( 14 saves / 16 shots ) | | Goalie stats | Devin Cooley ( 43 saves / 44 shots ) |

| May 11 | Milwaukee Admirals | 2–5 | Manitoba Moose | Canada Life Centre | Recap |
| Cody Glass (1) - 00:21; Jimmy Huntington (2) - 17:06 | | First period | No scoring |
| No scoring | | Second period | 03:52 - pp - Morgan Barron (2); 09:22 - Jeff Malott (1); 17:30 - pp - Leon Gawanke (1) |
| No scoring | | Third period | 09:11 - Nick Jones (1); 12:38 - Luke Johnson (1) |
| Devin Cooley ( 30 saves / 35 shots ) | | Goalie stats | Mikhail Berdin ( 21 saves / 23 shots ) |

| May 13 | Milwaukee Admirals | 3–7 | Manitoba Moose | Canada Life Centre | Recap |
| Brayden Burke (2) - 07:23; Cole Smith (1) - pp - 15:50 | | First period | 06:22 - Morgan Barron (3); 12:41 - Evan Polei (1) |
| No scoring | | Second period | 04:33 - Nick Jones (2); 15:33 - pp - Ville Heinola (1); 17:35 - Declan Chisholm (2) |
| Joseph LaBate (1) - 08:38 | | Third period | 12:34 - pp - Mikey Eyssimont (1); 17:54 - Luke Johnson (2) |
| Connor Ingram ( 37 saves / 44 shots ) | | Goalie stats | Mikhail Berdin ( 22 saves / 25 shots ) |

| May 15 | Milwaukee Admirals | 2–1 | Manitoba Moose | Canada Life Centre | Recap |
| Juuso Parssinen (1) - 13:05 | | First period | No scoring |
| Tommy Novak (1) - pp - 01:30 | | Second period | 04:13 - pp - Morgan Barron (4) |
| No scoring | | Third period | No scoring |
| Connor Ingram ( 27 saves / 28 shots ) | | Goalie stats | Mikhail Berdin ( 19 saves / 21 shots ) |

| Milwaukee won series 3–2 |

==== (P1) Stockton Heat vs. (P4) Bakersfield Condors ====
| May 10 | Bakersfield Condors | 1–3 | Stockton Heat | Stockton Arena | Recap |
| No scoring | | First period | 12:32 - sh - Jakob Pelletier (1); 13:55 - Mathias Emilio Pettersen (1) |
| Dino Kambeitz (1) - 08:35 | | Second period | 15:09 - Walker Duehr (1) |
| No scoring | | Third period | No scoring |
| Stuart Skinner ( 26 saves / 29 shots ) | | Goalie stats | Dustin Wolf ( 27 saves / 28 shots ) |

| May 11 | Bakersfield Condors | 2–3 | Stockton Heat | Stockton Arena | Recap |
| No scoring | | First period | No scoring |
| Brad Malone (2) - pp - 16:31 | | Second period | 12:13 - Alex Gallant (1) |
| Devin Brosseau (1) - 01:09 | | Third period | 00:39 - Nick DeSimone (1); 07:02 - Mathias Emilio Pettersen (2) |
| Stuart Skinner ( 25 saves / 28 shots ) | | Goalie stats | Dustin Wolf ( 22 saves / 24 shots ) |

| May 13 | Stockton Heat | 6–4 | Bakersfield Condors | Mechanics Bank Arena | Recap |
| Jakob Pelletier (2) - pp - 07:51 | | First period | 09:16 - pp - Brendan Perlini (1) |
| Byron Froese (1) - 01:24; Glenn Gawdin (1) - 07:05 | | Second period | 00:51 - Dylan Holloway (1); 13:58 - Alex Peters (1) |
| Nick DeSimone (2) - pp - 06:04; Walker Duehr (2) - 10:33; Justin Kirkland (1) - en - 19:58 | | Third period | 11:57 - pp - Dylan Holloway (2) |
| Dustin Wolf ( 38 saves / 42 shots ) | | Goalie stats | Stuart Skinner ( 35 saves / 40 shots ) |

| Stockton won series 3–0 |

==== (P2) Ontario Reign vs. (P3) Colorado Eagles ====
| May 11 | Ontario Reign | 1–10 | Colorado Eagles | Budweiser Events Center | Recap |
| Brett Sutter (1) - 06:13 | | First period | 02:17 - Keaton Middleton (1); 04:19 - sh - Ryan Wagner (2); 05:32 - sh - Keaton Middleton (2); 09:55 - pp - Kiefer Sherwood (2); 11:31 - Kiefer Sherwood (3); 16:13 - pp - Stefan Matteau (2) |
| No scoring | | Second period | 15:32 - Alex Beaucage (2); 16:11 - Mikhail Maltsev (2) |
| No scoring | | Third period | 06:40 - pp - Mikhail Maltsev (3); 14:00 - pp - Andreas Englund (1) |
| Matt Villalta ( 16 saves / 23 shots ) Dávid Hrenák ( 9 saves / 12 shots ) | | Goalie stats | Justus Annunen ( 34 saves / 35 shots ) |

| May 13 | Ontario Reign | 4–5 | OT | Colorado Eagles | Budweiser Events Center | Recap |
| Nelson Nogier (1) - 17:09 | | First period | | 11:26 - pp - Jordan Gross (1) |
| No scoring | | Second period | | 02:30 - Jayson Megna (3) |
| Frederic Allard (1) - 08:13; Akil Thomas (4) - 17:46; Vladimir Tkachev (2) - 19:27 | | Third period | | 08:58 - Ryan Wagner (3); 12:46 - Jayson Megna (4) |
| No scoring | | First overtime period | | 13:37 - Jean-Luc Foudy (3) |
| Garret Sparks ( 36 saves / 41 shots ) | | Goalie stats | | Justus Annunen ( 32 saves / 36 shots ) |

| May 15 | Colorado Eagles | 5–2 | Ontario Reign | Toyota Arena | Recap |
| Mikhail Maltsev (4) - 18:47 | | First period | No scoring |
| Jayson Megna (5) - 02:57; Stefan Matteau (3) - 16:48 | | Second period | 19:46 - Martin Frk (2) |
| Jacob MacDonald (1) - 04:29; Jayson Megna (6) - en - 19:41 | | Third period | 13:29 - pp - Samuel Fagemo (3) |
| Justus Annunen ( 31 saves / 33 shots ) | | Goalie stats | Garret Sparks ( 28 saves / 32 shots ) |

| Colorado won series 3–0 |

== Division finals ==
=== Eastern Conference ===
==== (A1) Charlotte Checkers vs. (A2) Springfield Thunderbirds ====
| May 22 | Charlotte Checkers | 0–6 | Springfield Thunderbirds | MassMutual Center | Recap |
| No scoring | | First period | 16:47 - pp - Nathan Todd (1) |
| No scoring | | Second period | 15:21 - pp - ps - Sam Anas (3) |
| No scoring | | Third period | 00:57 - Sam Anas (4); 03:06 - Mackenzie MacEachern (3); 03:34 - Klim Kostin (2); 16:03 - Tyler Tucker (1) |
| Joey Daccord ( 19 saves / 23 shots ) Christopher Gibson ( 3 saves / 5 shots ) | | Goalie stats | Joel Hofer ( 35 saves / 35 shots ) |

| May 25 | Charlotte Checkers | 3–4 | Springfield Thunderbirds | MassMutual Center | Recap |
| Zac Dalpe (6) - 04:22; Zac Dalpe (7) - pp - 12:39 | | First period | 18:31 - Tommy Cross (2) |
| No scoring | | Second period | 03:00 - pp - Brady Lyle (1) |
| Alexander True (1) - 11:31 | | Third period | 16:55 - William Bitten (3); 19:55 - pp - James Neal (1) |
| Joey Daccord ( 19 saves / 23 shots ) | | Goalie stats | Joel Hofer ( 47 saves / 50 shots ) |

| May 28 | Springfield Thunderbirds | 5–1 | Charlotte Checkers | Bojangles Coliseum | Recap |
| Nikita Alexandrov (2) - 10:45 | | First period | No scoring |
| Hugh McGing (2) - pp - 06:42 | | Second period | No scoring |
| James Neal (2) - 01:54; Dakota Joshua (3) - 08:08; Mackenzie MacEachern (4) - en - 19:00 | | Third period | 13:52 - Max McCormick (4) |
| Joel Hofer ( 34 saves / 35 shots ) | | Goalie stats | Joey Daccord ( 25 saves / 29 shots ) |

| Springfield won series 3–0 |

==== (N3) Laval Rocket vs. (N5) Rochester Americans ====
| May 22 | Rochester Americans | 1–6 | Laval Rocket | Place Bell | Recap |
| JJ Peterka (5) - 16:41 | | First period | 18:22 - Danick Martel (2) |
| No scoring | | Second period | 05:12 - Danick Martel (3); 08:26 - Cedric Paquette (3); 11:24 - Danick Martel (4) |
| No scoring | | Third period | 06:49 - pp - Danick Martel (5); 14:14 - Nate Schnarr (1) |
| Aaron Dell ( 16 saves / 20 shots ) Michael Houser ( 16 saves / 18 shots ) | | Goalie stats | Cayden Primeau ( 31 saves / 32 shots ) |

| May 23 | Rochester Americans | 1–3 | Laval Rocket | Place Bell | Recap |
| No scoring | | First period | 05:17 - Brandon Gignac (2) |
| No scoring | | Second period | 04:55 - Louie Belpedio (2) |
| Mark Jankowski (5) - 17:16 | | Third period | 09:21 - Lucas Condotta (1) |
| Aaron Dell ( 29 saves / 32 shots ) | | Goalie stats | Cayden Primeau ( 31 saves / 32 shots ) |

| May 25 | Laval Rocket | 6–5 | 3OT | Rochester Americans | Blue Cross Arena | Recap |
| No scoring | | First period | | 01:04 - Mark Jankowski (6); 08:05 - pp - JJ Peterka (6) |
| Brandon Gignac (3) - 13:52; Danick Martel (6) - 14:47; Xavier Ouellet (1) - 16:03; Jean-Sebastien Dea (2) - 17:48 | | Second period | | No scoring |
| Jesse Ylonen (2) - pp - 18:53 | | Third period | | 00:13 - Brett Murray (2); 01:32 - JJ Peterka (7); 08:35 - Brett Murray (3) |
| Jean-Sebastien Dea (3) - pp - 01:51 | | Third overtime period | | No scoring |
| Cayden Primeau ( 34 saves / 39 shots ) | | Goalie stats | | Aaron Dell ( 54 saves / 60 shots ) |

| Laval won series 3–0 |

=== Western Conference ===
==== (C1) Chicago Wolves vs. (C3) Milwaukee Admirals ====
| May 21 | Milwaukee Admirals | 2–6 | Chicago Wolves | Allstate Arena | Recap |
| No scoring | | First period | 00:32 - Jack Drury (3) |
| Cole Schneider (2) - 01:31 | | Second period | 09:30 - Josh Leivo (2); 16:03 - Jamieson Rees (1); 19:58 - Andrew Poturalski (2) |
| Jimmy Huntington (3) - pp - 02:29 | | Third period | 03:03 - Stelio Mattheos (2); 16:40 - en - Jack Drury (4) |
| Connor Ingram ( 17 saves / 21 shots ) Devin Cooley ( 12 saves / 13 shots ) | | Goalie stats | Alex Lyon ( 33 saves / 35 shots ) |

| May 22 | Milwaukee Admirals | 2–8 | Chicago Wolves | Allstate Arena | Recap |
| Jimmy Huntington (4) - 13:52 | | First period | 04:01 - Dave Gust (2); 15:10 - Dave Gust (3); 17:32 - Andrew Poturalski (3) |
| No scoring | | Second period | 03:47 - Stefan Noesen (3); 07:33 - Maxime Lajoie (2); 10:04 - pp - C. J. Smith (3); 11:08 - pp - Stefan Noesen (4); 19:15 - Stefan Noesen (5) |
| Cole Smith (2) - 01:01 | | Third period | No scoring |
| Connor Ingram ( 10 saves / 16 shots ) Devin Cooley ( 15 saves / 17 shots ) | | Goalie stats | Alex Lyon ( 30 saves / 32 shots ) |

| May 25 | Chicago Wolves | 2–4 | Milwaukee Admirals | UW–Milwaukee Panther Arena | Recap |
| No scoring | | First period | No scoring |
| No scoring | | Second period | 04:51 - pp - Rocco Grimaldi (1); 16:01 - pp - Cole Smith (3) |
| Jack Drury (5) - 00:09; Josh Leivo (3) - 14:44 | | Third period | 02:31 - pp - Cole Schneider (3); 05:41 - Brayden Burke (4) |
| Alex Lyon ( 21 saves / 25 shots ) | | Goalie stats | Devin Cooley ( 47 saves / 49 shots ) |

| May 27 | Chicago Wolves | 5–1 | Milwaukee Admirals | UW–Milwaukee Panther Arena | Recap |
| Maxime Lajoie (3) - 03:56; Josh Leivo (4) - pp - 11:02; Josh Jacobs (1) - 17:18 | | First period | No scoring |
| Josh Leivo (5) - pp - 01:01 | | Second period | 02:27 - pp - Cole Schneider (4) |
| Josh Leivo (6) - en - 17:53 | | Third period | No scoring |
| Alex Lyon ( 17 saves / 18 shots ) | | Goalie stats | Devin Cooley ( 26 saves / 30 shots ) |

| Chicago won series 3–1 |

==== (P1) Stockton Heat vs. (P3) Colorado Eagles ====
| May 23 | Colorado Eagles | 0–5 | Stockton Heat | Stockton Arena | Recap |
| No scoring | | First period | No scoring |
| No scoring | | Second period | 04:09 - Justin Kirkland (2); 06:58 - pp - Andy Welinski (1); 14:34 - Eetu Tuulola (1) |
| No scoring | | Third period | 03:16 - Justin Kirkland (3); 12:40 - Matthew Phillips (1) |
| Justus Annunen ( 25 saves / 30 shots ) | | Goalie stats | Dustin Wolf ( 23 saves / 23 shots ) |

| May 24 | Colorado Eagles | 0–1 | Stockton Heat | Stockton Arena | Recap |
| No scoring | | First period | No scoring |
| No scoring | | Second period | 04:27 - pp - Justin Kirkland (4) |
| No scoring | | Third period | No scoring |
| Justus Annunen ( 23 saves / 24 shots ) | | Goalie stats | Dustin Wolf ( 27 saves / 27 shots ) |

| May 27 | Stockton Heat | 5–6 | OT | Colorado Eagles | Budweiser Events Center | Recap |
| Matthew Phillips (2) - 13:54; Jakob Pelletier (3) - 17:35 | | First period | | 11:26 - Shane Bowers (1) |
| Matthew Phillips (3) - pp - 03:57 | | Second period | | 12:02 - Ryan Wagner (4); 18:00 - Dylan Sikura (1) |
| Walker Duehr (3) - 01:10; Martin Pospisil (1) - 03:56 | | Third period | | 01:58 - pp - Kiefer Sherwood (4); 16:52 - Dylan Sikura (2) |
| No scoring | | First overtime period | | 10:07 - Jean-Luc Foudy (4) |
| Dustin Wolf ( 32 saves / 38 shots ) | | Goalie stats | | Justus Annunen ( 39 saves / 44 shots ) |

| May 29 | Stockton Heat | 1–0 | Colorado Eagles | Budweiser Events Center | Recap |
| No scoring | | First period | No scoring |
| No scoring | | Second period | No scoring |
| Justin Kirkland (5) - 03:29 | | Third period | No scoring |
| Dustin Wolf ( 40 saves / 40 shots ) | | Goalie stats | Justus Annunen ( 34 saves / 35 shots ) |

| Stockton won series 3–1 |

== Conference finals ==
=== Eastern Conference ===
==== (A2) Springfield Thunderbirds vs. (N3) Laval Rocket ====
| June 4 | Laval Rocket | 1–2 | OT | Springfield Thunderbirds | MassMutual Center | Recap |
| No scoring | | First period | | No scoring |
| Danick Martel (7) - 15:11 | | Second period | | No scoring |
| No scoring | | Third period | | 17:04 - Brady Lyle (2) |
| No scoring | | First overtime period | | 09:32 - Matthew Peca (3) |
| Cayden Primeau ( 37 saves / 39 shots ) | | Goalie stats | | Joel Hofer ( 41 saves / 42 shots ) |

| June 5 | Laval Rocket | 4–2 | Springfield Thunderbirds | MassMutual Center | Recap |
| Brandon Gignac (4) - 5:26; Jesse Ylonen (3) - 11:06 | | First period | 14:42 - Mackenzie MacEachern (5) |
| Alex Belzile (5) - 3:05; Rafael Harvey-Pinard (1) - 18:09 | | Second period | No scoring |
| No scoring | | Third period | 02:24 - Klim Kostin (3) |
| Cayden Primeau ( 33 saves / 35 shots ) | | Goalie stats | Charlie Lindgren ( 22 saves / 26 shots ) |

| June 8 | Springfield Thunderbirds | 6–3 | Laval Rocket | Place Bell | Recap |
| Nathan Todd (2) - 08:56 | | First period | 05:51 - Rafael Harvey-Pinard (2) |
| Hugh McGing (3) - 15:09; William Bitten (4) - 17:39 | | Second period | 18:51 - Corey Schueneman (1) |
| William Bitten (5) - 0:35; William Bitten (6) - sh - 5:59; William Bitten (7) - en - 17:02 | | Third period | 19:49 - Nate Schnarr (2) |
| Joel Hofer ( 37 saves / 40 shots ) | | Goalie stats | Cayden Primeau ( 37 saves / 42 shots ) |

| June 10 | Springfield Thunderbirds | 2–3 | OT | Laval Rocket | Place Bell | Recap |
| Mackenzie MacEachern (6) - 03:47; Dakota Joshua (4) - 07:26 | | First period | | 19:59 - pp - Jean-Sebastien Dea (4) |
| No scoring | | Second period | | 02:37 - Cedric Paquette (4) |
| No scoring | | Third period | | No scoring |
| No scoring | | First overtime period | | 04:06 - Rafael Harvey-Pinard (3) |
| Joel Hofer ( 48 saves / 51 shots ) | | Goalie stats | | Cayden Primeau ( 42 saves / 44 shots ) |

| June 11 | Springfield Thunderbirds | 3–2 | OT | Laval Rocket | Place Bell | Recap |
| No scoring | | First period | | 11:32 - pp - Rafael Harvey-Pinard (4) |
| Nathan Todd (3) - 16:03 | | Second period | | 12:05 - Rafael Harvey-Pinard (5) |
| Dakota Joshua (5) - 15:36 | | Third period | | No scoring |
| James Neal (3) - 18:35 | | First overtime period | | No scoring |
| Charlie Lindgren ( 25 saves / 27 shots ) | | Goalie stats | | Cayden Primeau ( 44 saves / 47 shots ) |

| June 13 | Laval Rocket | 5–1 | Springfield Thunderbirds | MassMutual Center | Recap |
| No scoring | | First period | No scoring |
| Danick Martel (8) - 04:58 | | Second period | No scoring |
| Gabriel Bourque (2) - 01:45; Danick Martel (9) - 08:51; Brandon Gignac (5) - en - 17:14; Lucas Condotta (2) - pp - 19:19 | | Third period | 15:05 - Matthew Peca (4) |
| Cayden Primeau ( 30 saves / 31 shots ) | | Goalie stats | Joel Hofer ( 26 saves / 30 shots ) |

| June 15 | Laval Rocket | 0–4 | Springfield Thunderbirds | MassMutual Center | Recap |
| No scoring | | First period | 06:45 - pp - Matthew Peca (5) |
| No scoring | | Second period | 09:33 - Dakota Joshua (6); 13:31 - pp - Nathan Todd (4) |
| No scoring | | Third period | 19:18 - en - Dakota Joshua (7) |
| Cayden Primeau ( 36 saves / 39 shots ) | | Goalie stats | Charlie Lindgren ( 34 saves / 34 shots ) |

| Springfield won series 4–3 |

=== Western Conference ===
==== (C1) Chicago Wolves vs. (P1) Stockton Heat ====
| June 3 | Stockton Heat | 4–5 | OT | Chicago Wolves | Allstate Arena | Recap |
| Luke Philp (1) - 09:11 | | First period | | 06:09 - pp - Josh Leivo (7) |
| Walker Duehr (4) - 02:43; Eetu Tuulola (2) - 04:11 | | Second period | | 09:50 - Jalen Chatfield (1); 12:50 - pp - Josh Leivo (8) |
| Connor Zary (1) - 11:25 | | Third period | | 10:26 - pp - Stefan Noesen (6) |
| No scoring | | First overtime period | | 02:26 - Jamieson Rees (2) |
| Dustin Wolf ( 35 saves / 40 shots ) | | Goalie stats | | Alex Lyon ( 24 saves / 28 shots ) |

| June 6 | Stockton Heat | 2–3 | Chicago Wolves | Allstate Arena | Recap |
| Eetu Tuulola (3) - sh - 6:57 | | First period | 0:17 - Jack Drury (6) |
| Justin Kirkland (6) - 7:20 | | Second period | 11:00 - pp - Noel Gunler (1) |
| No scoring | | Third period | 19:42 - Josh Leivo (9) |
| Dustin Wolf ( 18 saves / 21 shots ) | | Goalie stats | Pyotr Kochetkov ( 33 saves / 35 shots ) |

| June 8 | Chicago Wolves | 3–0 | Stockton Heat | Stockton Arena | Recap |
| No scoring | | First period | No scoring |
| Richard Panik (1) - 19:16 | | Second period | No scoring |
| Ivan Lodnia (2) - 05:45; Stefan Noesen (7) - en - 19:28 | | Third period | No scoring |
| Alex Lyon ( 23 saves / 23 shots ) | | Goalie stats | Dustin Wolf ( 27 saves / 29 shots ) |

| June 10 | Chicago Wolves | 3–4 | OT | Stockton Heat | Stockton Arena | Recap |
| Jack Drury (7) - pp - 04:40 | | First period | | 16:08 - Martin Pospisil (2) |
| Andrew Poturalski (4) - 01:57 | | Second period | | No scoring |
| Josh Leivo (10) - 4:56 | | Third period | | 05:04 - Justin Kirkland (7); 19:11 - Glenn Gawdin (2) |
| No scoring | | First overtime period | | 06:43 - pp - Glenn Gawdin (3) |
| Pyotr Kochetkov ( 34 saves / 38 shots ) | | Goalie stats | | Dustin Wolf ( 31 saves / 34 shots ) |

| June 11 | Chicago Wolves | 2–3 | OT | Stockton Heat | Stockton Arena | Recap |
| Spencer Smallman (1) - sh - 3:28 | | First period | | 17:23 - Walker Duehr (5) |
| Richard Panik (2) - pp - 09:52 | | Second period | | 03:27 - Jakob Pelletier (4) |
| No scoring | | Third period | | No scoring |
| No scoring | | First overtime period | | 14:27 - Connor Mackey (1) |
| Alex Lyon ( 32 saves / 35 shots ) | | Goalie stats | | Dustin Wolf ( 37 saves / 39 shots ) |

| June 14 | Stockton Heat | 0–3 | Chicago Wolves | Allstate Arena | Recap |
| No scoring | | First period | No scoring |
| No scoring | | Second period | No scoring |
| No scoring | | Third period | 08:35 – Ivan Lodnia (3); 18:40 – Andrew Poturalski (5); 19:15 – en – Josh Leivo (11) |
| Dustin Wolf ( 35 saves / 37 shots ) | | Goalie stats | Pyotr Kochetkov ( 28 saves / 28 shots ) |

| Chicago won series 4–2 |

== Calder Cup finals ==
=== (C1) Chicago Wolves vs. (A2) Springfield Thunderbirds ===
| June 19 | Springfield Thunderbirds | 5–4 | OT | Chicago Wolves | Allstate Arena | Recap |
| Hugh McGing (4) – pp – 14:15; Matthew Peca (6) – 19:26 | | First period | | 10:07 – pp – Jack Drury (8) |
| No scoring | | Second period | | 08:01 – Richard Panik (3); 08:18 – Dave Gust (4) |
| Tommy Cross (3) – 0:53; Brady Lyle (3) – 18:32 | | Third period | | 0:29 – pp – Stefan Noesen (8) |
| Matthew Kessel (1) – 05:09 | | First overtime period | | No scoring |
| Charlie Lindgren ( 33 saves / 37 shots ) | | Goalie stats | | Alex Lyon ( 30 saves / 35 shots ) |

| June 20 | Springfield Thunderbirds | 2–6 | Chicago Wolves | Allstate Arena | Recap |
| No scoring | | First period | 01:42 – Richard Panik (4); 02:11 – Spencer Smallman (2); 08:15 – Joey Keane (1); 10:12 – pp – Josh Leivo (12) |
| Calle Rosen (1) – pp – 13:54; William Bitten (8) – 16:23 | | Second period | 05:18 – Andrew Poturalski (6) |
| No scoring | | Third period | 09:15 – pp – Josh Leivo (13) |
| Joel Hofer ( 35 saves / 41 shots ) | | Goalie stats | Pyotr Kochetkov ( 22 saves / 24 shots ) |

| June 22 | Chicago Wolves | 4–0 | Springfield Thunderbirds | MassMutual Center | Recap |
| Richard Panik (5) – pp – 14:50 | | First period | No scoring |
| Ivan Lodnia (4) – 06:25; Jalen Chatfield (2) – 14:36 | | Second period | No scoring |
| Stefan Noesen (9) – pp, en – 16:56 | | Third period | No scoring |
| Pyotr Kochetkov ( 36 saves / 36 shots ) | | Goalie stats | Charlie Lindgren ( 30 saves / 33 shots ) |

| June 24 | Chicago Wolves | 4–2 | Springfield Thunderbirds | MassMutual Center | Recap |
| Jack Drury (9) – pp – 17:25; Richard Panik (6) – pp – 19:47 | | First period | No scoring |
| Andrew Poturalski (7) – 06:20 | | Second period | 16:53 – pp – Klim Kostin (4) |
| Josh Leivo (14) – en – 17:14 | | Third period | 18:13 – James Neal (4) |
| Pyotr Kochetkov ( 39 saves / 41 shots ) | | Goalie stats | Joel Hofer ( 28 saves / 31 shots ) |

| June 25 | Chicago Wolves | 4–0 | Springfield Thunderbirds | MassMutual Center | Recap |
| Maxime Lajoie (4) – 18:39 | | First period | No scoring |
| Andrew Poturalski (8) – pp – 16:01 | | Second period | No scoring |
| Dave Gust (5) – 17:02; Josh Leivo (15) – en – 19:37 | | Third period | No scoring |
| Alex Lyon ( 28 saves / 28 shots ) | | Goalie stats | Charlie Lindgren ( 26 saves / 29 shots ) |

| Chicago won series 4–1 |

== Playoff statistical leaders ==
=== Leading skaters ===
These are the top ten skaters based on points. If there is a tie in points, goals take precedence over assists.

| Player | Team | GP | G | A | Pts | PIM |
|---|---|---|---|---|---|---|
| Josh Leivo | Chicago Wolves | 18 | 15 | 14 | 29 | 20 |
| Stefan Noesen | Chicago Wolves | 18 | 9 | 16 | 25 | 18 |
| Jack Drury | Chicago Wolves | 18 | 9 | 15 | 24 | 10 |
| Andrew Poturalski | Chicago Wolves | 18 | 8 | 15 | 23 | 26 |
| William Bitten | Springfield Thunderbirds | 18 | 8 | 13 | 21 | 22 |
| Matthew Peca | Springfield Thunderbirds | 18 | 6 | 10 | 16 | 2 |
| Danick Martel | Laval Rocket | 15 | 9 | 6 | 15 | 44 |
| Dakota Joshua | Springfield Thunderbirds | 18 | 7 | 8 | 15 | 58 |
| Sam Anas | Springfield Thunderbirds | 18 | 4 | 11 | 15 | 8 |
| Mackenzie MacEachern | Springfield Thunderbirds | 18 | 6 | 7 | 13 | 6 |

=== Leading goaltenders ===
This is a combined table of the top five goaltenders based on goals against average and the top five goaltenders based on save percentage with at least 60 minutes played. The table is initially sorted by goals against average, with the criterion for inclusion in bold.

| Player | Team | GP | W | L | SA | GA | GAA | SV% | SO | TOI |
|---|---|---|---|---|---|---|---|---|---|---|
| Matt Murray | Texas Stars | 2 | 0 | 2 | 62 | 3 | **1.52** | **.952** | 0 | 118:22 |
| Pyotr Kochetkov | Chicago Wolves | 6 | 5 | 1 | 202 | 10 | **1.65** | **.950** | 2 | 364:24 |
| Troy Grosenick | Providence Bruins | 2 | 0 | 2 | 66 | 4 | **1.68** | **.939** | 0 | 142:39 |
| Alex Lyon | Chicago Wolves | 12 | 9 | 3 | 325 | 25 | **2.03** | .923 | 2 | 737:26 |
| Cayden Primeau | Laval Rocket | 14 | 9 | 5 | 513 | 33 | **2.17** | **.936** | 0 | 912:16 |
| Spencer Martin | Abbotsford Canucks | 2 | 0 | 2 | 80 | 5 | 2.40 | **.938** | 0 | 124:56 |

| Preceded by ~~2021 Calder Cup playoffs~~ Cancelled | Calder Cup playoffs 2022 | Succeeded by 2023 Calder Cup playoffs |
