= Maxime Lajoie =

Canadian ice hockey player (born 1997)

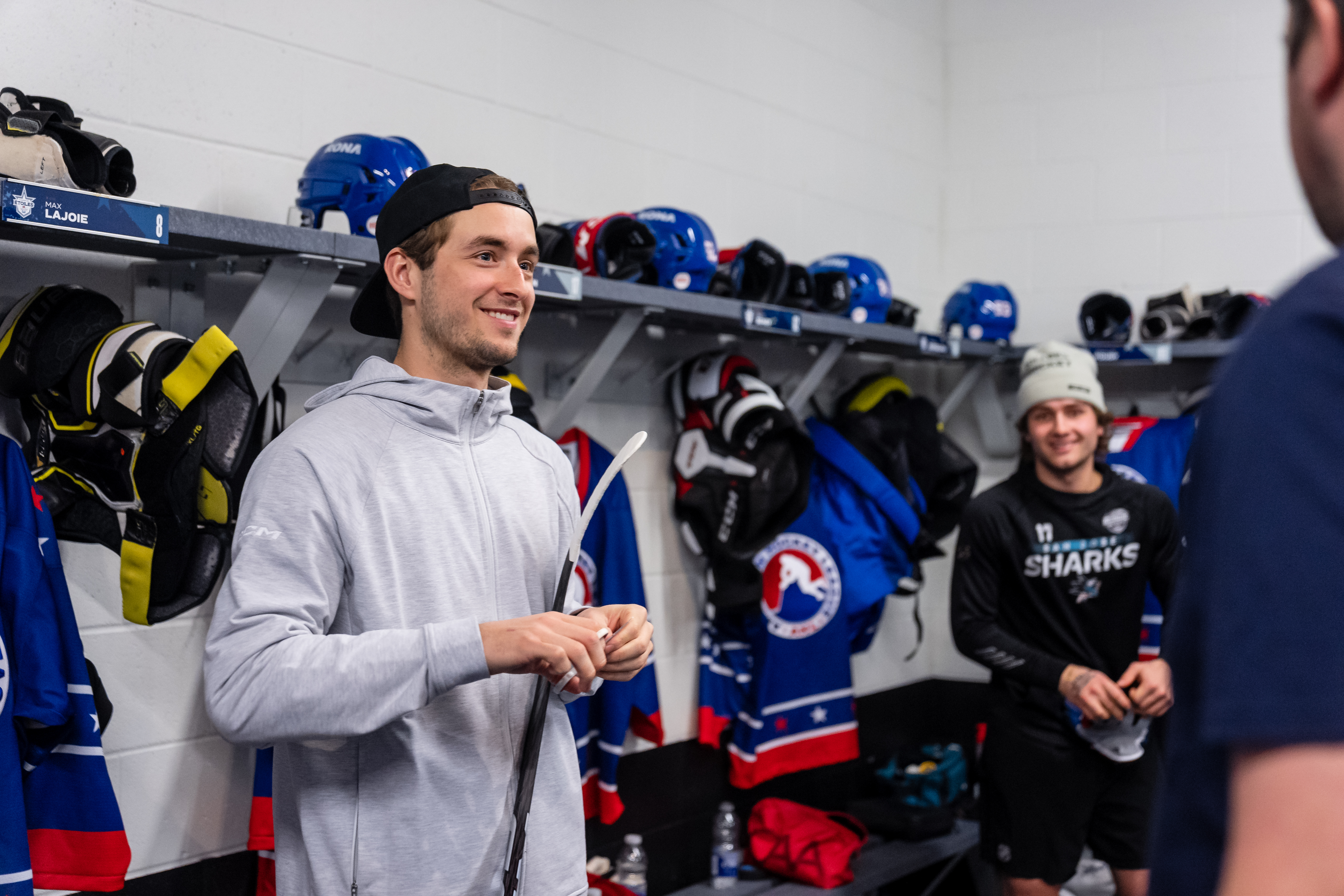
- Lajoie at the 2023 AHL All-Star Classic Game
- Born: November 5, 1997 (age 28) Quebec City, Quebec, Canada
- Height: 6 ft 1 in (185 cm)
- Weight: 191 lb (87 kg; 13 st 9 lb)
- Position: Defence
- Shoots: Left
- KHL team Former teams: Avangard Omsk; Ottawa Senators; Carolina Hurricanes; Toronto Maple Leafs
- NHL draft: 133rd overall, 2016; Ottawa Senators
- Playing career: 2017–present

Maxime Lajoie (born November 5, 1997) is a Canadian professional ice hockey defenceman for Avangard Omsk of the Kontinental Hockey League (KHL). Lajoie was chosen 133rd overall by the Ottawa Senators in the 2016 NHL entry draft. He has also played for the Carolina Hurricanes and Toronto Maple Leafs.

== Early life ==
Lajoie was born in Quebec City and moved to Montreal, Quebec; Toronto, Ontario and then Calgary, Alberta by the age of seven. His first language is French, but he is now bilingual.

== Playing career ==
=== Junior career ===
Lajoie played major junior hockey for the Swift Current Broncos of the Western Hockey League (WHL) from 2013 to 2017. He was drafted by the Broncos, 95th overall, in the 2012 WHL bantam draft. Lajoie played one game in 2013–14 and earned a roster spot in 2014–15. He increased his points per game over his three seasons with the Broncos. He returned to Swift Current as an alternate captain for his final season in junior.

=== Professional career ===
Lajoie was selected by the Ottawa Senators of the National Hockey League (NHL) in his first season of eligibility, going 133rd overall in the 2016 NHL entry draft. Lajoie's coach until 2016, former Senator Mark Lamb, considered the selection of Lajoie a "steal" at 133rd overall, noting he was the team's No. 1 penalty killer, No. 1 shut-down defenceman and assistant captain. Lajoie signed a three-year, entry-level contract with the Senators on October 3, 2016, and attended their training camp.

In 2017, he became a professional, joining the Belleville Senators of the American Hockey League (AHL) in September 2017. In November 2017, Lajoie was assigned to the Brampton Beast of the ECHL, returning to Belleville after one game with Brampton. In 2018, Lajoie made the jump to the NHL, earning a roster spot in training camp. He made his NHL debut on October 4, 2018, scoring a goal and an assist in a 4–3 overtime loss to the Chicago Blackhawks. Lajoie became the second Ottawa defenceman (after Wade Redden) to score in his NHL debut. He played in 56 games with the Senators in the 2018–19 season, scoring 7 goals and 15 points. He also appeared in three games with Belleville, registering just one assist. The Senators assigned Lajoie to Belleville to start the 2019–20 season. He was recalled by Ottawa in November and made his NHL season debut on November 22 in a 4–1 victory over the New York Rangers. He was returned to Belleville in December after playing in six games with Ottawa, going scoreless. He spent the rest of the season in Belleville, registering 4 goals and 17 points in 48 games before the AHL suspended play on March 12, 2020 due to the COVID-19 pandemic.

After attending the Senators training camp for the pandemic-delayed 2020–21 season, on January 12, 2021, Lajoie was traded by Ottawa to the Carolina Hurricanes in exchange for Clark Bishop. He was directly assigned by the Hurricanes to join AHL affiliate, the Chicago Wolves. He played in 27 games with Chicago, scoring 6 goals and 21 points. He was recalled by Carolina along with Ryan Suzuki and Alex Nedeljkovic during the 2021 Stanley Cup playoffs. and made his Hurricanes and playoff debut in Game 3's double overtime 5–4 loss to the Nashville Predators on May 21. He played in the following game, another double overtime loss, but was replaced by Jaccob Slavin who returned from injury for Game 5.

Lajoie was assigned to Chicago for the 2021–22 season. He was recalled by Carolina along with Jalen Chatfield on November 29, 2021. He and Chatfield made their NHL season debuts on November 30, replacing defencemen Brett Pesce and Tony DeAngelo in the lineup. The Hurricanes lost the game 4–1, though Lajoie played well. He appeared in five games with Carolina before being sent back to Chicago on December 13. In 60 games with the Wolves, he scored four goals and 33 points. In the 2022 Calder Cup playoffs, he added four goals and eight points. He won the 2022 Calder Cup with the Wolves, scoring the game winner in the cup clinching victory over the Springfield Thunderbirds. On August 6, 2022 the Hurricanes re-signed Lajoie's to an additional one-year contract. Named captain of the Wolves for the 2022–23 season, Lajoie was selected to play in the 2023 AHL All-Star Classic. In 63 games with Chicago he scored 11 goals and 45 points.

Following three seasons with the Hurricanes organization, Lajoie left as an unrestricted free agent and agreed to a one-year, two-way contract with the Toronto Maple Leafs on July 1, 2023. He attended the Maple Leafs 2023 training camp, but failed to make the team and was placed on waivers. After going unclaimed Lajoie was assigned to the Maple Leafs AHL affiliate, the Toronto Marlies to start the 2023–24 season. He was recalled by the Maple Leafs on November 4 after an injury to Timothy Liljegren and made his season debut against the Buffalo Sabres that night. He was returned to the Marlies on November 9. He spent the majority of the season with the Marlies, appearing in 56 games, scoring 4 goals and 24 points. He also appeared in seven games with the Maple Leafs, registering one assist.

An unrestricted free agent in the offseason, Lajoie signed a one-year, two-way contract with the Seattle Kraken on July 1, 2024. After going unclaimed on waivers, he was assigned to Seattle's AHL affiliate, the Coachella Valley Firebirds, to start the 2024–25 season.

At the completion of his contract with the Kraken, Lajoie left as a free agent and opted to pursue a career abroad by signing a one-year deal with Russian club, Avangard Omsk of the KHL, on July 22, 2025.

== Career statistics ==
			Regular season					Playoffs
Season	Team	League	GP	G	A	Pts	PIM	GP	G	A	Pts	PIM
2012–13	Calgary Royals	AMHL	28	1	10	11	12	5	1	2	3	0
2013–14	Calgary Royals	AMHL	32	7	10	17	10	—	—	—	—	—
2013–14	Swift Current Broncos	WHL	1	0	0	0	0	—	—	—	—	—
2014–15	Swift Current Broncos	WHL	72	7	33	40	22	4	1	2	3	0
2015–16	Swift Current Broncos	WHL	62	8	29	37	28	—	—	—	—	—
2016–17	Swift Current Broncos	WHL	68	7	35	42	26	14	1	8	9	10
2017–18	Belleville Senators	AHL	56	1	14	15	12	—	—	—	—	—
2017–18	Brampton Beast	ECHL	1	0	0	0	2	—	—	—	—	—
2018–19	Ottawa Senators	NHL	56	7	8	15	20	—	—	—	—	—
2018–19	Belleville Senators	AHL	3	0	1	1	0	—	—	—	—	—
2019–20	Belleville Senators	AHL	48	4	13	17	24	—	—	—	—	—
2019–20	Ottawa Senators	NHL	6	0	0	0	0	—	—	—	—	—
2020–21	Chicago Wolves	AHL	27	6	15	21	24	—	—	—	—	—
2020–21	Carolina Hurricanes	NHL	—	—	—	—	—	2	0	0	0	2
2021–22	Chicago Wolves	AHL	60	4	29	33	10	18	4	4	8	18
2021–22	Carolina Hurricanes	NHL	5	0	0	0	0	—	—	—	—	—
2022–23	Chicago Wolves	AHL	63	11	34	45	58	—	—	—	—	—
2022–23	Carolina Hurricanes	NHL	3	0	0	0	0	—	—	—	—	—
2023–24	Toronto Marlies	AHL	51	4	20	24	31	3	0	0	0	0
2023–24	Toronto Maple Leafs	NHL	7	0	1	1	0	—	—	—	—	—
2024–25	Coachella Valley Firebirds	AHL	70	4	34	38	32	6	1	0	1	0
2025–26	Avangard Omsk	KHL	68	11	30	41	18	17	4	2	6	12
NHL totals			77	7	9	16	20	2	0	0	0	2

== Awards and honours ==
Award	Year
AHL
Calder Cup (Chicago Wolves)	2022
