= Jalen Chatfield =

American ice hockey player (born 1996)

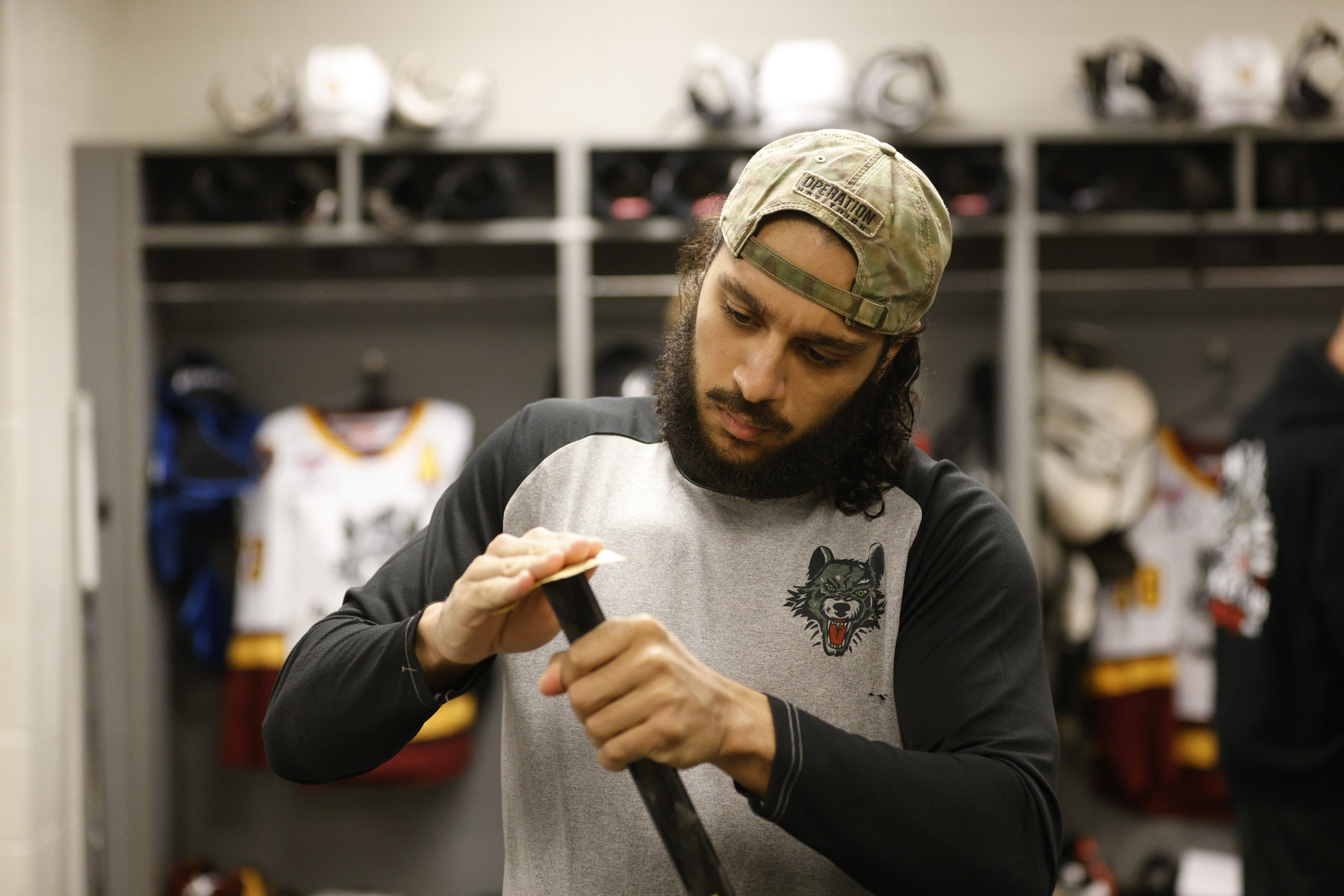
- Chatfield in 2022
- Born: May 15, 1996 (age 30) Ypsilanti, Michigan, U.S.
- Height: 6 ft 1 in (185 cm)
- Weight: 209 lb (95 kg; 14 st 13 lb)
- Position: Defense
- Shoots: Right
- NHL team Former teams: Carolina Hurricanes; Vancouver Canucks
- NHL draft: Undrafted
- Playing career: 2017–present

Jalen Chatfield (born May 15, 1996) is an American professional ice hockey player who is a defenseman for the Carolina Hurricanes of the National Hockey League (NHL). He previously played with the Vancouver Canucks.

Growing up in Michigan, Chatfield began playing organized competitive ice hockey with the Compuware Triple-A Under-13 team. He then spent two seasons with the Belle Tire Midget Major U18 team before signing with the Windsor Spitfires of the Ontario Hockey League. While with the Spitfires, Chatfield helped them win the 2017 Memorial Cup. Chatfield won the Stanley Cup with the Hurricanes in 2026.

== Early life ==
Chatfield was born on May 15, 1996, in Ypsilanti, Michigan, U.S. to parents Scott and Tomara. Chatfield is biracial, with a white father and black mother. Despite his father playing basketball and his sister playing soccer, Chatfield chose to participate in biking, rollerblading, skateboarding and baseball. Growing up, he was a fan of the Detroit Red Wings of the National Hockey League (NHL) and specifically admired Nicklas Lidström.

== Playing career ==
=== Amateur ===
Growing up in Michigan, Chatfield began playing organized competitive ice hockey with the Compuware Triple-A Under-13 team. He then spent two seasons with the Belle Tire Midget Major U18 team before signing with the Madison Capitols of the United States Hockey League for their inaugural season. In his first season with the Belle Tire, Chatfield had recorded three goals and 18 assists through 40 games. The following year, he improved to 11 goals and 15 assists. and was praised for being an "elite skating defenseman with good puck skills." Despite being committed to the Capitols, Chatfield signed with the Windsor Spitfires of the Ontario Hockey League (OHL) prior to the 2014–15 season.

Chatfield subsequently joined the Spitfires for the entirety of the 2014–15 season. In his rookie season, Chatfield scored his first career OHL goal in his 53rd game of the season. At the conclusion of the season, Chatfield received the teams' Most Improved Player award. In spite of his lack of scoring, Chatfield was invited to participate in the Detroit Red Wings Development camp during the offseason. After attending the Red Wings camp, Chatfield was returned to the Spitfires for the 2015–16 season. Upon rejoining the team, Chatfield immediately made an offensive impact by doubling his goal total from the previous season within the first four games. In November 2015, Chatfield was named the Player of the Week after he scored two goals and four assists over three games. His scoring prowess continued as the season progressed as he tallied eight goals and 33 points over half the season. During the offseason, Chatfield attended the San Jose Sharks rookie camp where he impressed the coaches enough to earn an invite to their training camp. However, Chatfield was returned to the Spitfires before the final roster was announced.

The 2016–17 season would prove to be Chatfield's last in the OHL. He finished the season ranking third among Spitfire defencemen with 28 points and eight goals and second in assists with 20. Chatfield's defensive efforts were recognized by OHL coaches as he tied with Kyle Pettit for the second best penalty killer in the Western Conference. On March 1, 2017, Chatfield was named co-captain of the Spitfires alongside Jeremiah Addison. A few days later, Chatfield signed an entry-level contract with the Vancouver Canucks of the NHL to begin his professional career.

=== Professional ===
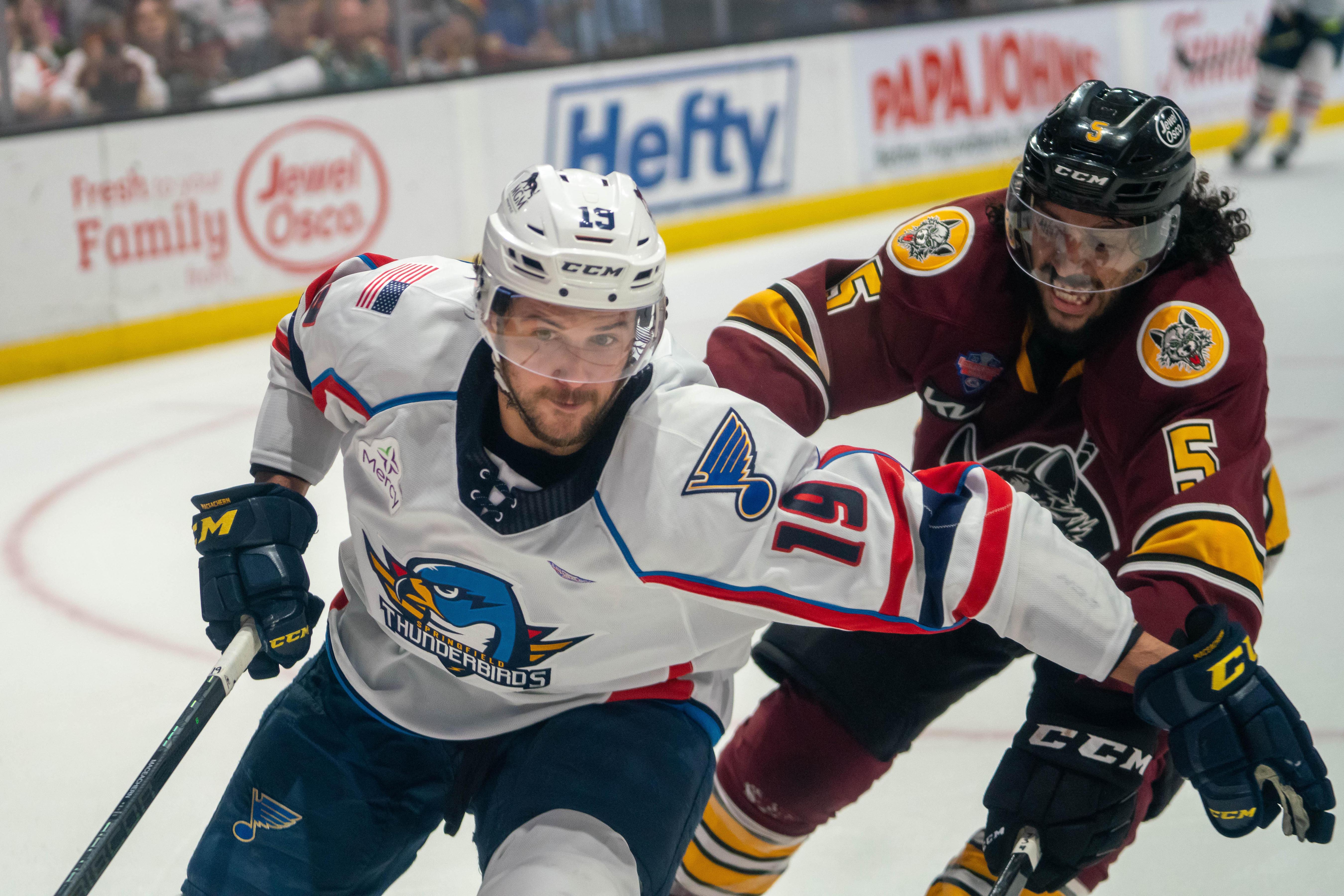
Chatfield and Mackenzie MacEachern during the 2022 Calder Cup playoffs.

Chatfield joined the Canucks' American Hockey League (AHL) affiliate, the Utica Comets, for the 2017–18 season. Throughout his rookie season, Chatfield was paired with Patrick Wiercioch and spent time on Utica's penalty kill unit. During a game against the Hartford Wolf Pack on November 18, 2017, he tallied his first professional point with an assist on Carter Bancks' first-period goal. His first AHL goal came on March 31, 2018, in a 6–5 win over the Springfield Thunderbirds. Chatfield's two goals scored during the 2017–18 season were his only with the Comets throughout his tenure.

Following his rookie season, Chatfield participated in the Canucks' training camp prior to the 2018–19 season. He was cut before the final roster was announced and reassigned to the Utica Comets to begin the season. Chatfield appeared in seven games for the Comets, collecting one assist and six penalty minutes, before being recalled to the NHL level on November 1, 2018. Chatfield did not make his NHL debut during the call-up and returned to the Comets on November 7. He shortly thereafter suffered a foot injury on November 17 and subsequently missed 27 games to recover. After returning to the lineup in January, Chatfield tallied six more assists.

On December 9, 2020, he was re-signed by the Canucks to a one-year, two-way contract. He played in his first career NHL game on January 20, 2021 against the Montreal Canadiens. He recorded his first NHL point, an assist on April 18, 2021 against the Toronto Maple Leafs.

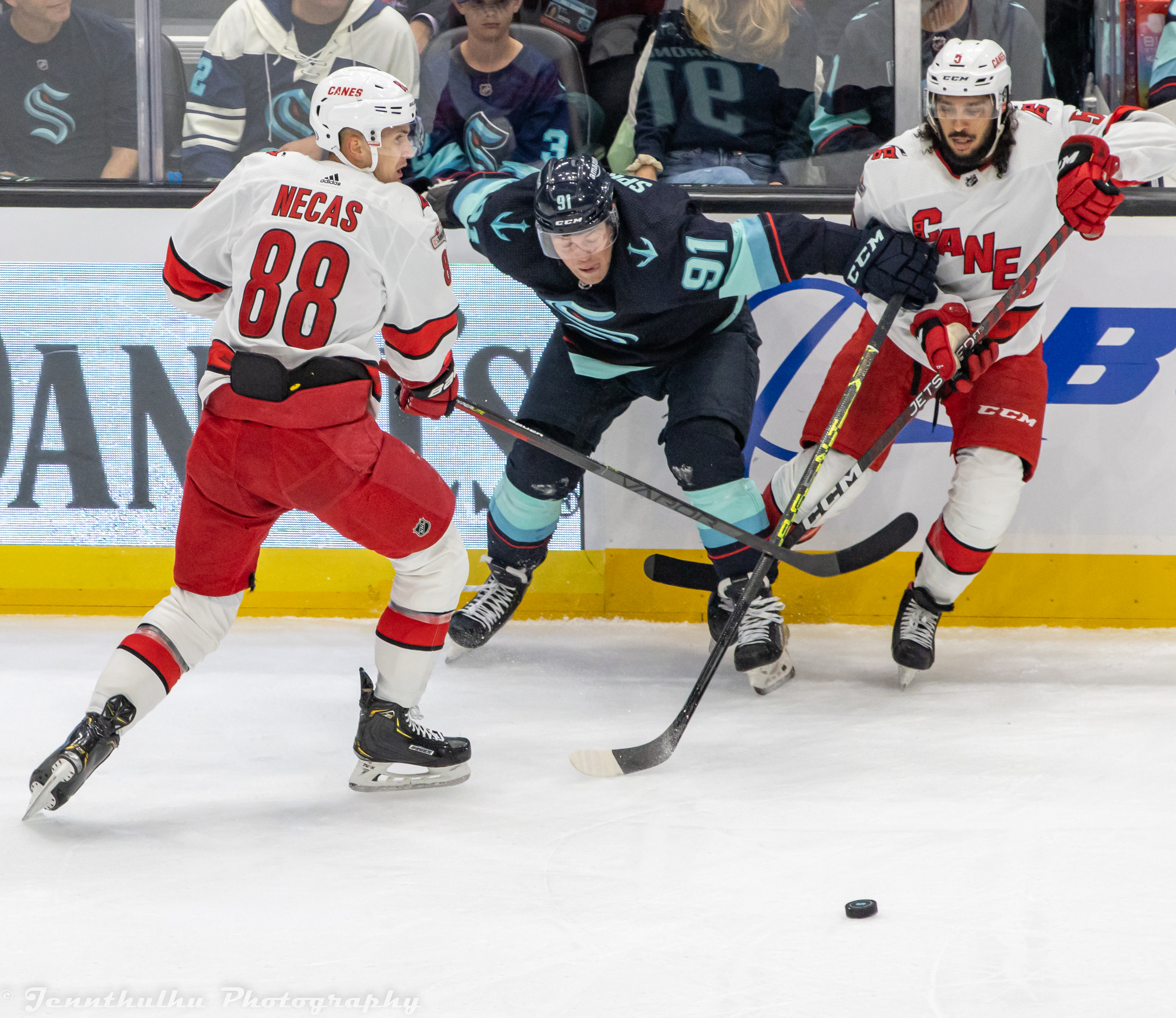
Chatfield (right) in a game against the Seattle Kraken in 2022.

A group 6 free agent from the Canucks, Chatfield signed a one-year, two-way contract with the Carolina Hurricanes on July 29, 2021. On January 21, 2022, he was re-signed by the Hurricanes to a two-year contract extension through the 2023-2024 season. Chatfield scored his first NHL goal on December 22, 2022 in a 4–3 overtime victory over the Pittsburgh Penguins. On June 14, 2024, after setting career highs in goals and points, he was re-signed to a three-year $9 million contract extension through the 2026–27 season.

== Career statistics ==
			Regular season					Playoffs
Season	Team	League	GP	G	A	Pts	PIM	GP	G	A	Pts	PIM
2012–13	Belle Tire	T1EHL	40	3	18	21	18	—	—	—	—	—
2013–14	Belle Tire	T1EHL	37	11	15	26	40	—	—	—	—	—
2014–15	Windsor Spitfires	OHL	60	1	20	21	35	—	—	—	—	—
2015–16	Windsor Spitfires	OHL	68	10	27	37	45	5	2	0	2	0
2016–17	Windsor Spitfires	OHL	61	8	20	28	56	7	0	2	2	4
2017–18	Utica Comets	AHL	60	2	5	7	26	5	0	1	1	2
2018–19	Utica Comets	AHL	34	0	6	6	15	—	—	—	—	—
2019–20	Utica Comets	AHL	48	0	4	4	16	—	—	—	—	—
2020–21	Vancouver Canucks	NHL	18	0	1	1	12	—	—	—	—	—
2021–22	Chicago Wolves	AHL	44	6	12	18	33	18	2	6	8	16
2021–22	Carolina Hurricanes	NHL	16	0	3	3	8	—	—	—	—	—
2022–23	Carolina Hurricanes	NHL	78	6	8	14	35	15	1	3	4	14
2023–24	Carolina Hurricanes	NHL	72	8	14	22	24	11	0	2	2	12
2024–25	Carolina Hurricanes	NHL	79	7	11	18	54	9	1	0	1	6
2025–26	Carolina Hurricanes	NHL	72	2	15	17	18	19	1	7	8	12
NHL totals			335	23	52	75	151	54	3	12	15	44

== Awards and honors ==
Award	Year	Ref
CHL
Memorial Cup champion	2017	
AHL
Calder Cup champion	2022	
NHL
Stanley Cup champion	2026	
