= Dave Gust =

American ice hockey player

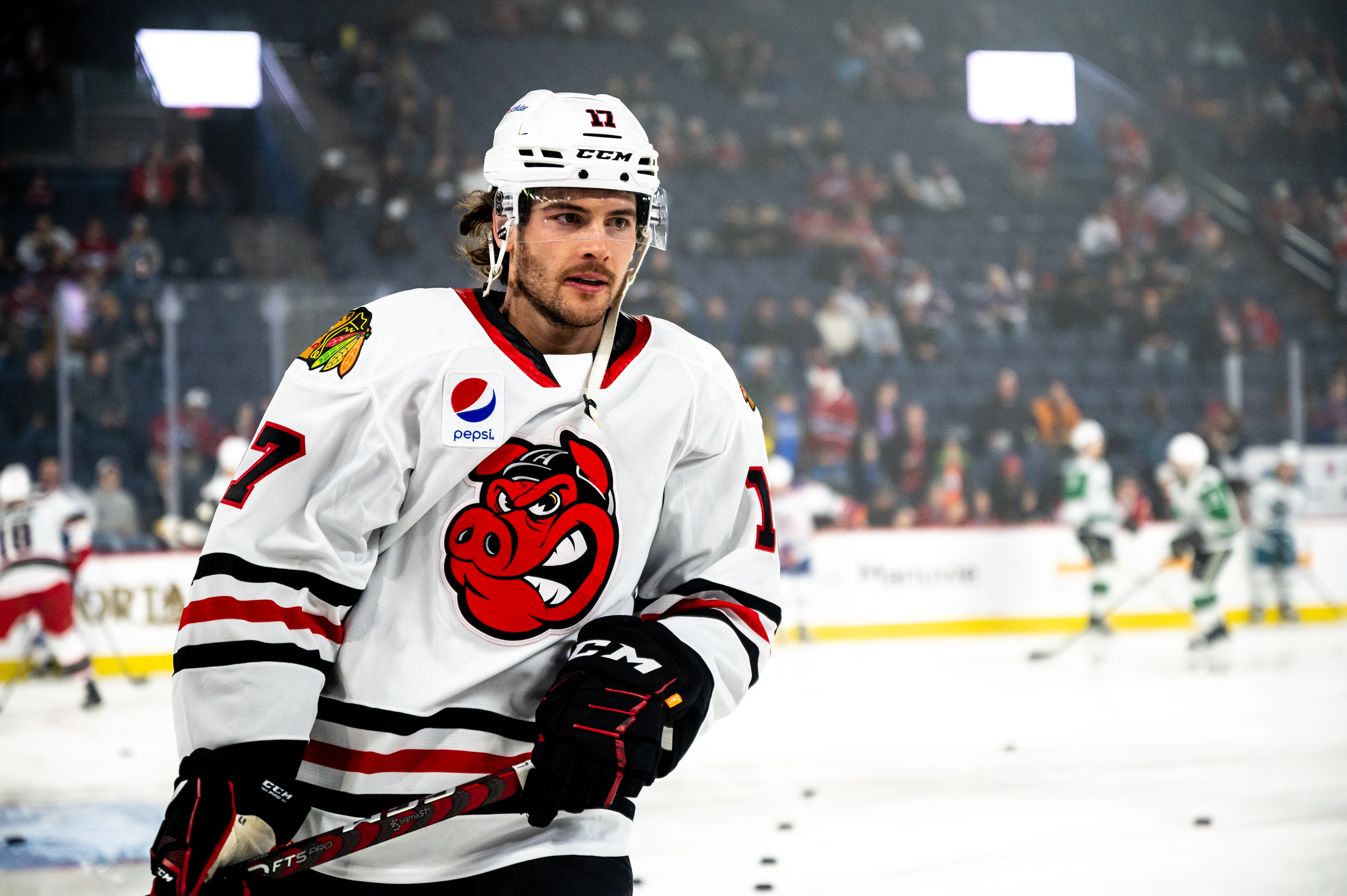
- Gust with the Rockford IceHogs in 2023
- Born: February 21, 1994 (age 32) Orland Park, Illinois, U.S.
- Height: 5 ft 10 in (178 cm)
- Weight: 176 lb (80 kg; 12 st 8 lb)
- Position: Right wing
- Shoots: Right
- NHL team Former teams: Free agent Chicago Blackhawks
- NHL draft: Undrafted
- Playing career: 2017–present

David Gust (born February 21, 1994) is an American former professional ice hockey winger. He most recently played with the Rockford IceHogs in the American Hockey League (AHL) while under contract to the Chicago Blackhawks of the National Hockey League (NHL).

== Playing career ==
=== Amateur ===
After playing minor hockey for the Chicago Fury in the Tier 1 Elite Hockey League (T1EHL), Gust was drafted 99th overall by the Fargo Force in the seventh round of the 2011 United States Hockey League (USHL) Entry Draft.

On November 4, 2011, Gust made his USHL debut in a 4–2 win against the Lincoln Stars. He scored his first USHL goal in a 5–3 loss against the Indiana Ice on November 26, 2011, and finished his debut season with 14 goals and 16 assists in 43 games played. In his sophomore season for the Force, he played in 64 games scoring 21 goals and 28 assists en route to a Clark Cup Final appearance.

Gust played collegiate hockey for the Ohio State Buckeyes in the Big Ten Conference from 2013 to 2017, following the footsteps of his older sister, Kara. During his rookie season, he appeared in 26 games, scoring 6 goals and 4 assists. He played in 25 games with three goals and five assists in his sophomore season and was an Academic All-Big Ten honoree. He improved in his junior season, playing in a career-high 36 games and scoring 11 goals and 25 points, and was named to his second Academic All-Big Ten selection. Before his senior season, Gust was named as an alternate captain for the Buckeyes; he played in 39 games with 18 points and 23 assists and was named to the Big Ten All-Tournament Team.

=== Professional ===
After graduating from Ohio State University, on May 2, 2017, Gust signed with the Bakersfield Condors to a one-year AHL contract. On October 12, 2017, he made his professional hockey league debut in a 5–4 win against the San Antonio Rampage, scoring two goals. He ultimately appeared in 53 games scoring 13 goals and 11 assists, leading the Condors in rookie scoring. On September 4, 2018, he re-signed with the Condors to a one-year AHL contract. Overall, he appeared in 59 games, scoring 18 goals and 15 assists that season.

Prior to the start of the 2019–20 AHL season, he signed with the Charlotte Checkers to a one-year AHL contract, recording 11 goals and 20 assists in 60 games played. On October 16, 2020, the Carolina Hurricanes signed Gust to a one-year, two-way contract. He appeared in 16 games, recording two goals and two assists for the Hurricanes' AHL affiliate, the Chicago Wolves.

Gust re-signed with the Wolves to a one-year AHL contract before the start of the 2021–22 AHL season.

On July 22, 2022, Gust was signed as a free agent to a one-year contract in joining his fourth AHL club, the Rockford IceHogs, affiliate to the Chicago Blackhawks. In the following 2022–23 season, Gust immediately emerged as an offensive presence with the IceHogs, leading the team in scoring with 50 points through 51 games before he was signed to a two-year, two-way contract with the Chicago Blackhawks and immediately recalled to the NHL on February 23, 2023. In his NHL debut with the Blackhawks, Gust scored his first career NHL goal on his first shift during a 4–3 shootout victory over the San Jose Sharks on February 25. Gust was a 2023 AHL All-Star, where he went on to win the AHL accuracy shooting competition.

In September 2024, Gust retired from professional hockey.

== Personal life ==
Gust started skating at the age of 4 after a neighborhood friend introduced him to hockey. He graduated from Marist High School in 2012. At Ohio State University, he majored in Consumer and Family Financial Services.

In 2021, David married his wife Lexi Gust.

== Career statistics ==
			Regular season					Playoffs
Season	Team	League	GP	G	A	Pts	PIM	GP	G	A	Pts	PIM
2011–12	Fargo Force	USHL	43	14	16	30	6	6	2	1	3	6
2012–13	Fargo Force	USHL	64	21	28	49	24	13	3	12	15	4
2013–14	Ohio State University	B1G	26	6	4	10	10	—	—	—	—	—
2014–15	Ohio State University	B1G	25	2	5	7	21	—	—	—	—	—
2015–16	Ohio State University	B1G	36	11	25	36	24	—	—	—	—	—
2016–17	Ohio State University	B1G	39	18	23	41	16	—	—	—	—	—
2017–18	Bakersfield Condors	AHL	53	13	11	24	12	—	—	—	—	—
2018–19	Bakersfield Condors	AHL	59	18	15	33	24	10	0	3	3	4
2019–20	Charlotte Checkers	AHL	60	11	20	31	8	—	—	—	—	—
2020–21	Chicago Wolves	AHL	16	2	2	4	10	—	—	—	—	—
2021–22	Chicago Wolves	AHL	64	16	20	36	18	18	5	7	12	14
2022–23	Rockford IceHogs	AHL	65	26	33	59	54	5	2	1	3	0
2022–23	Chicago Blackhawks	NHL	4	1	0	1	2	—	—	—	—	—
2023–24	Rockford IceHogs	AHL	62	16	26	42	36	4	0	1	1	2
NHL totals			4	1	0	1	2	—	—	—	—	—

== Awards and honors ==
Award	Year
AHL
Calder Cup (Chicago Wolves)	2022
