= Mikhail Berdin =

Russian ice hockey player (born 1998)

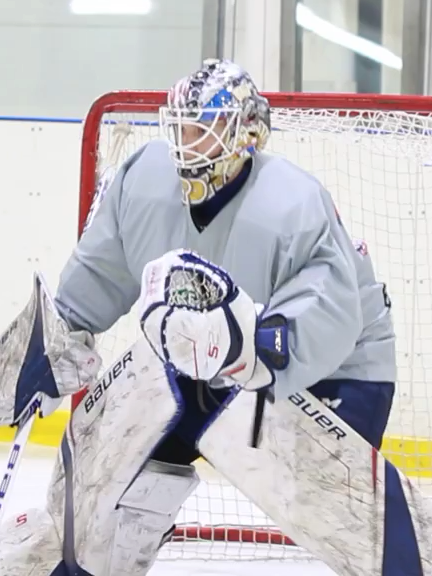
- Berdin in 2018
- Born: 1 March 1998 (age 28) Ufa, Russia
- Height: 6 ft 3 in (191 cm)
- Weight: 212 lb (96 kg; 15 st 2 lb)
- Position: Goaltender
- Catches: Left
- KHL team Former teams: Sibir Novosibirsk; SKA Saint Petersburg; HC Sochi; Avangard Omsk; Ak Bars Kazan
- NHL draft: 157th overall, 2016; Winnipeg Jets
- Playing career: 2018–present

Mikhail Berdin (1 March 1998) is a Russian professional ice hockey goaltender currently playing for Sibir Novosibirsk of the Kontinental Hockey League (KHL). Berdin was drafted by the Winnipeg Jets in the sixth round, 157th overall, in the 2016 NHL entry draft.

== Early life ==
Berdin was born on 1 March 1998 in Ufa, Russia.

== Playing career ==
=== Junior ===
Berdin finishes the 2015–16 season with the Russian Under-18 team recording a 2.07 goals-against average and a .928 save percentage in 22 games. He was subsequently drafted by the Winnipeg Jets in the sixth round, 157th overall, in the 2016 NHL entry draft. Following the draft, Berdin attended the Jets' development camp before joining the Sioux Falls Stampede in the United States Hockey League (USHL). In his rookie season, he was the recipient of two CCM Co-Goaltender of the Week Awards. Over his two seasons with the Stampede, Berdin went 38–25–9 with a 2.69 goals-against average and .922 save percentage. During a game against the Muskegon Lumberjacks on November 20, Berdin scored a goal on their empty net to help the Stampede clinch their 7–4 win. His celebration following the goal went viral.

=== Professional ===
Berdin concluded his junior hockey career on 19 May 2018 by signing a three-year entry-level contract with the Jets with an average annual value of $766,666.67. Berdin was reassigned to the Jets' American Hockey League affiliate, the Manitoba Moose, following the Jets' 2018 training camp. After joining the Moose, he was again reassigned to their ECHL affiliate, the Jacksonville Icemen. Berdin returned to the Moose full time in the 2019–20 season where he posted a 20–21–1 record with a 2.89 goals-against average and a .910 save percentage in 42 games. In December 2020, the Jets agreed to a two-year contract extension with an average annual value in the NHL of $750,000.

Berdin began the 2020–21 season with the SKA Saint Petersburg in the Kontinental Hockey League (KHL). He played 14 games with the team and posted a 6–3–2 record.

Entering his final season under contract with the Jets, Berdin entered the NHL Substance Abuse program, citing the desire to return to his native Russia. On 13 October 2022, Berdin's KHL rights were traded by SKA Saint Petersburg in a return to HC Sochi. He then joined Sochi on loan from the Winnipeg Jets for the 2022–23 season on 18 October 2022.

At the conclusion of the 2023–24 season, having established himself as a starting goaltender appearing in a career high 50 regular season games, Berdin was traded by Sochi in a three-team transaction to Avangard Omsk and was immediately signed to a two-year contract on 8 May 2024.

In the 2024–25 season, Berdin served as Avangard Omsk's backup goaltender, collecting 7 wins in 11 appearances. He left the club at the conclusion of the season to continue his career in the KHL by signing a one-year contract with Ak Bars Kazan on 7 August 2025.
