= Arttu Ruotsalainen =

Finnish ice hockey player

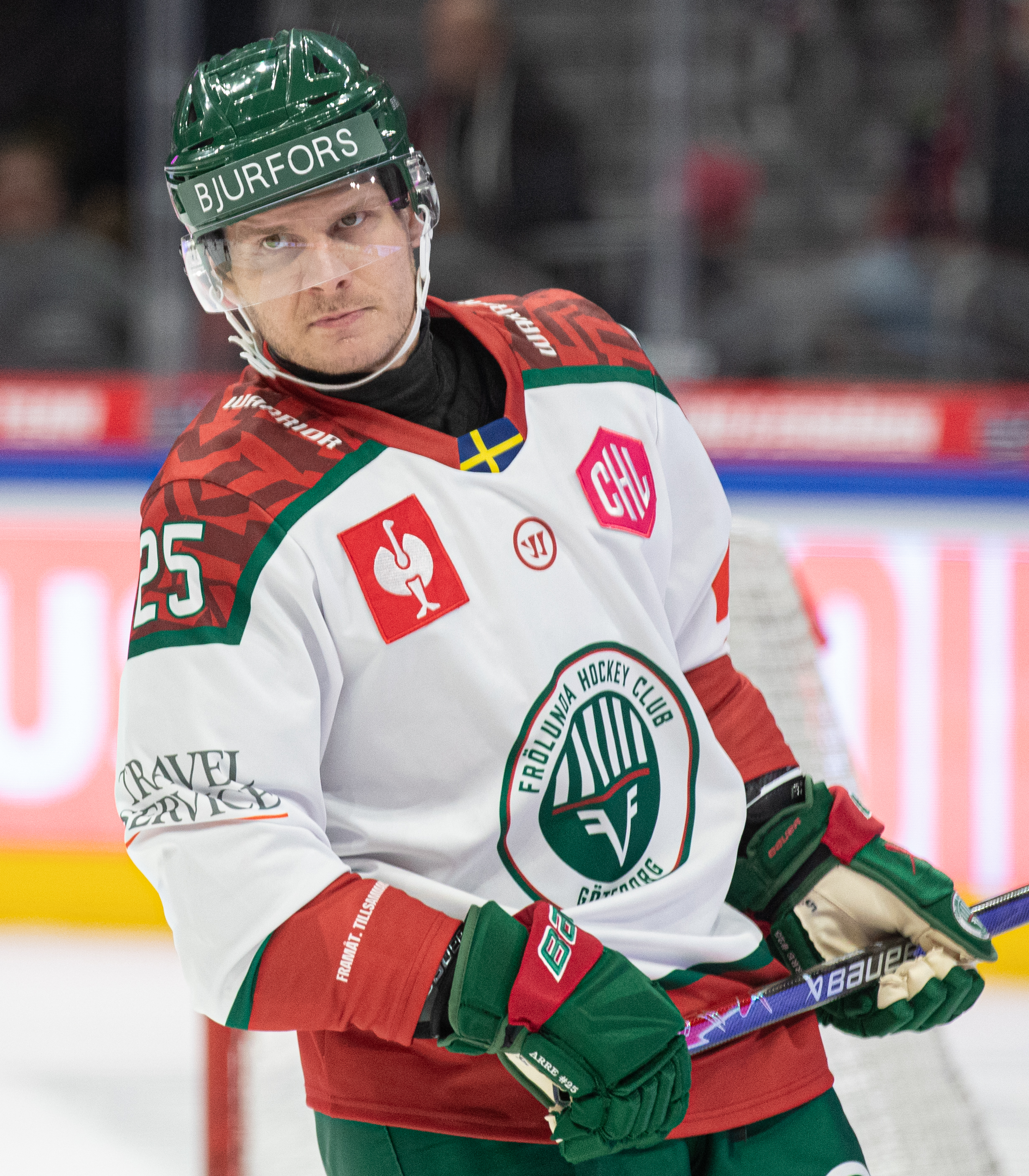
- Ruotsalainen in 2025
- Born: 29 October 1997 (age 28) Oulu, Finland
- Height: 175 cm (5 ft 9 in)
- Weight: 84 kg (185 lb; 13 st 3 lb)
- Position: Forward
- Shoots: Left
- NL team Former teams: Frölunda HC; Ässät; Ilves; Buffalo Sabres; EHC Kloten; HC Lugano
- National team: Finland
- NHL draft: Undrafted
- Playing career: 2015–present

Arttu Ruotsalainen (born 29 October 1997) is a Finnish professional ice hockey forward for Frölunda HC of the Swedish Hockey League (SHL).

== Playing career ==
Ruotsalainen first played as a youth within hometown club, Oulun Kärpät. As a 14-year old he played at the under-16 level in 2011–12, edging out teammate and future NHL player Sebastian Aho, to lead the team in scoring with 24 goals and 59 points. He shared fourth place in the C Junior Championship with Alex Olkinuora of Tappara.

In the following 2012–13 season, Ruotsalainen played the majority of the year at the under-18 level, returning to strengthen the under-16 team for the postseason where he won the C Youth Championship series in 2013 with 27 points in just 11 games. Ruotsalainen continued his ascension up the junior levels playing the majority of the 2013–14 season at the under-20 league, the Nuorten SM-liiga.

Showing early offensive potential, Ruotsalainen was selected 47th overall at the 2014 KHL Junior Draft by Metallurg Novokuznetsk. He continued to play in the Nuorten SM-liiga in the 2014–15 season. At the conclusion of the year, he secured his first professional Liiga contract, agreeing to an optional three-year contract with Ässät on 17 June 2015.

In the 2015–16 season, Ruotsalainen made his Liiga debut in the opening round on 11 September 2015, against rival club Lukko. He went scoreless in nine minutes of ice time. He later registered his first professional goal in a 3–1 defeat by the Espoo Blues on 24 November 2015. By season's end, he totalled 10 points in 51 regular season games. He split the year continuing to play at the under-20 level, registering 32 points in just 18 games, to lead the league in points-per-game with 1.78.

In the 2016–17 season, Ruotsalainen played in a reduced role with Ässät, posting just one goal in 34 games, with a solitary appearance in the postseason.

In order to continue his development, Ruotsalainen left Ässät to sign a one-year contract with fellow Liiga club, Ilves on 7 April 2017. In the 2017–18 season, he improved his play, producing nine goals and 20 points in 60 Liiga games. During the campaign he was signed to a two-year deal before again extending his tenure with Ilves on another two-year contract in the early stages of the 2018–19 season to remain contracted through 2022.

In his second season with Ilves, Ruotsalainen accelerated his development in the Liiga, leading the club in scoring with 21 goals and 42 points at the centre position, finishing ninth in Liiga scoring. During the season he scored his first career hat-trick, notching the feat in a 6–5 victory over HIFK on 23 January 2019. In the playoffs, Ruotsalainen continued to lead Ilves with seven points in as many games.

Undrafted, Ruotsalainen gained the interest from the National Hockey League (NHL), using an out-clause in his contract with Ilves to sign a three-year, entry-level contract with the Buffalo Sabres on 8 March 2019. He made his NHL debut with the team on 9 April 2021, in a game against the Washington Capitals. Ruotsalainen scored his first career NHL goal on 11 April in a 5–3 victory against the Philadelphia Flyers.

As a restricted free agent from the Sabres following the 2021–22 season, Ruotsalainen opted to return to Europe by agreeing to a one-year contract with Swiss champions, EHC Kloten of the National League (NL), on 22 July 2022. On 6 April 2023, HC Lugano communicates an agreement with the player for a two-years contract.

== International play ==
Medal record

Ice hockey

Representing Finland

World Championships
Silver medal – second place	2021 Latvia	

IIHF World U18 Championships
Silver medal – second place	2015 Switzerland	

Ruotsalainen played for Finland's under-18 team in the Ivan Hlinka Memorial Tournament in 2014, where his was the captain, and at the 2015 U18 World Championships, where he won a silver medal. He also played for junior team in the 2017 World Junior Championships.

Ruotsalainen was called into the Finland senior team, added to the roster in the Karjala Tournament on 8 November 2018, at the Hartwall Arena in Helsinki against Russia. While he did not end up with ice time, he made his debut in the next game on 10 November, against the Czech Republic. Ruotsalainen was among the last cuts from the national team for the 2019 World Championship. He later played for senior team in the 2021 World Championship where Finland won silver medals.

== Career statistics ==
=== Regular season and playoffs ===
			Regular season					Playoffs
Season	Team	League	GP	G	A	Pts	PIM	GP	G	A	Pts	PIM
2012–13	Ässät	Jr. A	2	0	0	0	2	—	—	—	—	—
2013–14	Ässät	Jr. A	39	13	18	31	16	7	0	1	1	2
2014–15	Ässät	Jr. A	46	12	21	33	55	5	2	1	3	0
2015–16	Ässät	Jr. A	18	12	20	32	14	3	1	1	2	0
2015–16	Ässät	Liiga	51	5	5	10	4	—	—	—	—	—
2016–17	Ässät	Liiga	34	1	0	1	10	1	0	0	0	0
2016–17	Ässät	Jr. A	7	6	3	9	8	6	3	7	10	0
2017–18	Ilves	Liiga	60	9	11	20	12	—	—	—	—	—
2018–19	Ilves	Liiga	59	21	21	42	14	7	2	5	7	6
2019–20	Ilves	Liiga	44	15	28	43	14	—	—	—	—	—
2020–21	Ilves	Liiga	19	16	11	27	8	—	—	—	—	—
2020–21	Rochester Americans	AHL	13	5	8	13	2	—	—	—	—	—
2020–21	Buffalo Sabres	NHL	17	5	1	6	8	—	—	—	—	—
2021–22	Buffalo Sabres	NHL	18	2	2	4	6	—	—	—	—	—
2021–22	Rochester Americans	AHL	57	18	33	51	26	10	8	4	12	4
2022–23	EHC Kloten	NL	52	18	24	42	36	3	1	0	1	6
2023–24	HC Lugano	NL	43	5	9	14	8	8	2	0	2	2
2024–25	Frölunda HC	SHL	43	11	11	22	16	12	3	4	7	4
2025–26	Frölunda HC	SHL	50	15	21	36	18	6	1	3	4	0
Liiga totals			267	67	76	143	62	8	2	5	7	6
NHL totals			35	7	3	10	14	—	—	—	—	—

=== International ===
Year	Team	Event	Result	GP	G	A	Pts	PIM
2014	Finland	IH18	5th	4	1	1	2	18
2015	Finland	U18	2nd place, silver medalist(s)	7	0	2	2	0
2017	Finland	WJC	9th	6	0	0	0	0
2021	Finland	WC	2nd place, silver medalist(s)	10	4	1	5	2
Junior totals				17	1	3	4	18
Senior totals				10	4	1	5	2
