= Ryan Wagner (ice hockey) =

American ice hockey player

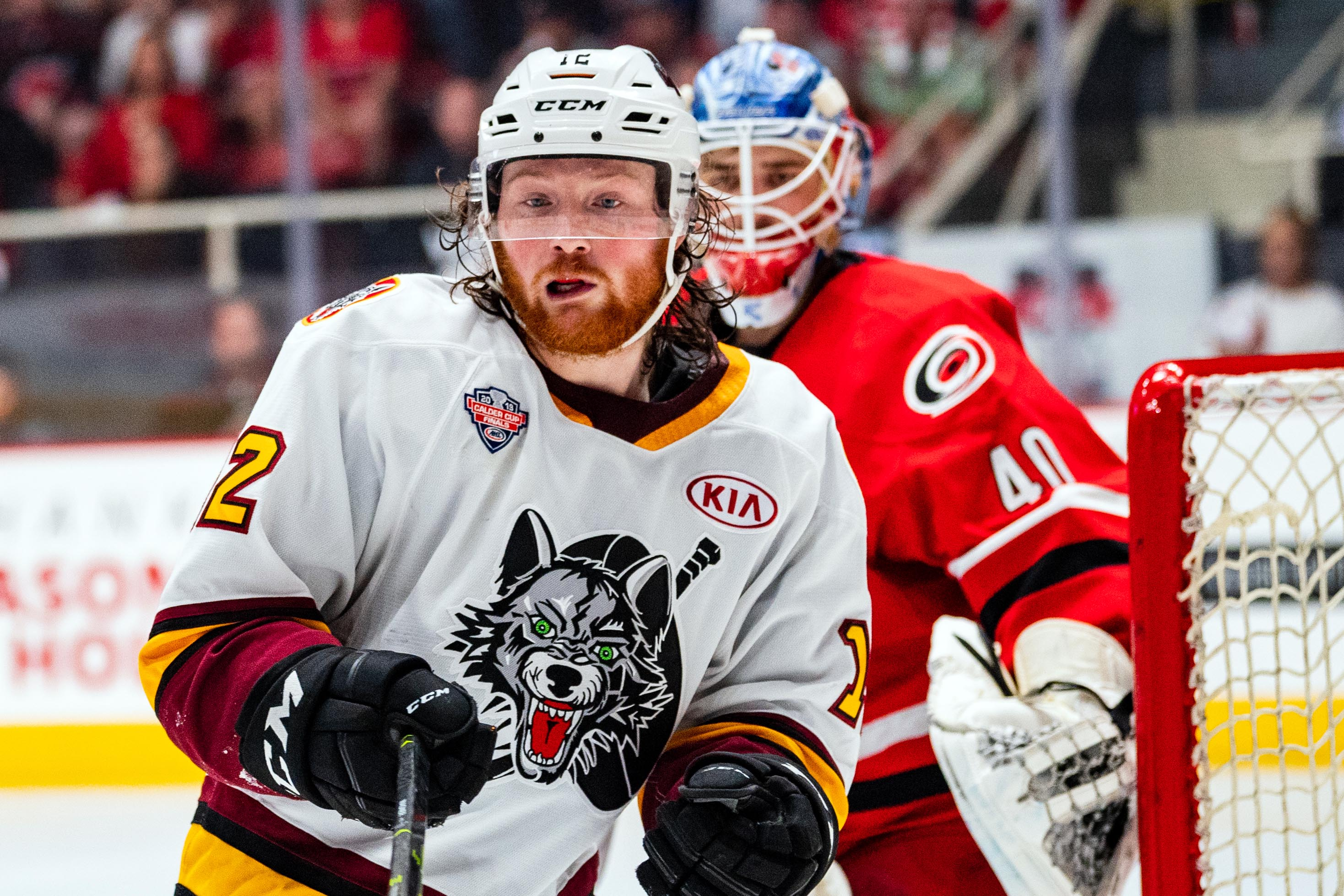
- Wagner with the Chicago Wolves in 2019
- Born: April 15, 1996 (age 30) Park Ridge, Illinois, U.S.
- Height: 5 ft 8 in (173 cm)
- Weight: 185 lb (84 kg; 13 st 3 lb)
- Position: Left wing
- Shoots: Left
- ECHL team Former teams: Rapid City Rush; Chicago Wolves; Colorado Eagles
- NHL draft: Undrafted
- Playing career: 2018–present

Ryan Wagner (born April 15, 1996) is an American professional ice hockey forward who is currently playing for the Rapid City Rush of the ECHL.

== Playing career ==
=== Amateur ===
Wagner played as a youth within his homestate, Illinois, with the Chicago Mission of the HPHL through to the under-16 level before joining the U.S. National Team Development program to play the 2013–14 season with the under-17 and under-18 teams. While attending Ann Arbor Pioneer High School, he registered 9 points through 28 games within the United States Hockey League (USHL) before committing to a collegiate career with the University of Wisconsin of the Big Ten Conference (B1G).

After completing his freshman season with the Badgers in the 2014–15 season, contributing with a modest 2 goals and 5 points through 35 games, Wagner increased his presence through his sophomore season surpassing his entire freshman points totals through the first 9 games and finishing the 2015–16 season with 10 goals and 22 points in 35 games.

Appearing in every game with the Wisconsin Badgers as a junior in the 2016–17 season, Wagner established his identity as a high compete checking-line role player, in posting 9 goals and 28 points through 36 contests.

Returning for his senior season with the Badgers, Wagner was selected as an alternate captain for the 2017–18 season. Establishing a new career best with 15 goals and 33 points, Wagner appeared in all 37 games with Wisconsin and drew his collegiate career to a close in receiving the teams' Spike Carlson/Chris Chelios Most Valuable Player award.

=== Professional ===
Having concluded his four-year college hockey tenure, Wagner embarked on his professional career in initially signing a professional tryout contract with hometown team the Chicago Wolves of the American Hockey League on March 8, 2018. He made his professional debut against the Milwaukee Admirals and registered an assist, on March 9, 2018, and appeared in 7 games with the Wolves to complete the 2017–18 regular season.

Impressing the Wolves NHL affiliate, the Vegas Golden Knights, Wagner was re-signed by Chicago to a one-year AHL contract on May 10, 2018. In the 2018–19 season, Wagner registered his first professional goal, in a 4–2 victory over the Manitoba Moose on November 18, 2018. As a depth forward for the Wolves, Wagner finished the regular season with 4 goals and 7 points through 49 regular season games. He appeared in 14 playoff games with the Wolves helping the team reach the Calder Cup finals in a defeat to the Charlotte Checkers.

As a free agent, Wagner left the Wolves organization in the off-season and was signed to a one-year, two-way AHL contract with the Colorado Eagles, affiliate to the Colorado Avalanche, on July 31, 2019. Splitting the 2019–20 season between the Eagles and ECHL affiliate, the Utah Grizzlies, Wagner registered 20 points through 23 games for the Grizzlies before contributing and eclipsing his previous season AHL totals with 6 goals and 10 points in just 24 games before the remainder of the season was cancelled due to the COVID-19 pandemic.

On April 8, 2020, the Eagles opted to re-sign Wagner to a one-year AHL contract extension for the 2020–21 season. In showing development and growth within the Eagles in a checking-line role, Wagner was elevated as an alternate captain during the campaign and contributed with 5 goals and 13 points through 34 regular season games of the pandemic shortened season.

On June 24, 2021, Wagner continued his tenure with the Eagle by agreeing to a two-year contract extension. Adding an energetic presence to the Eagles, Wagner notched career high marks in the 2021–22 season, in registering 10 goals and 14 assists for 24 points through 50 regular season games. He helped the Eagles advance to the Divisional Finals against the Stockton Heat, finishing with 4 goals in 9 games.

Entering his third year as an alternate captain with the Eagles in the 2022–23 season, Wagner made his 200th AHL appearance in a 5–2 victory over the Ontario Reign on January 18, 2023. He completed his fourth season with the Eagles, notching 6 goals and 17 points through 67 regular season games.

As a free agent from the Eagles, Wagner was un-signed over the summer leading into the 2023–24 season. On October 2, 2023, Wagner accepted an invitation to return to his original club, the Chicago Wolves, training camp. Impressing the coaching staff with his veteran leadership through his initial PTO with Chicago, Wagner was signed for the remainder of the season on December 24, 2023. He made 63 regular season appearances with the Wolves, unable to help the club return to the playoffs in posting 3 goals and 10 points.

Following his seventh year in the AHL, Wagner as a free agent opted to continue his career in the ECHL, agreeing to a standard player contract for the 2024–25 season with the Rapid City Rush on August 27, 2024.

== Personal ==
Born to Dan and Pattie Wagner, he attended Maine South High School in Park Ridge, Illinois, and Ann Arbor Pioneer High School. As part of a sporting family, his father played collegiate baseball at Northwestern and his three younger siblings, Bridget, Megan and Sean all played collegiate hockey.

== Career statistics ==
=== Regular season and playoffs ===
			Regular season					Playoffs
Season	Team	League	GP	G	A	Pts	PIM	GP	G	A	Pts	PIM
2013–14	U.S. National Development Team	USHL	28	5	4	9	10	—	—	—	—	—
2014–15	University of Wisconsin	B1G	35	2	3	5	12	—	—	—	—	—
2015–16	University of Wisconsin	B1G	35	10	12	22	12	—	—	—	—	—
2016–17	University of Wisconsin	B1G	36	9	19	28	16	—	—	—	—	—
2017–18	University of Wisconsin	B1G	37	15	18	33	36	—	—	—	—	—
2017–18	Chicago Wolves	AHL	7	0	1	1	0	—	—	—	—	—
2018–19	Chicago Wolves	AHL	49	4	3	7	10	14	0	0	0	2
2019–20	Utah Grizzlies	ECHL	23	9	11	20	12	—	—	—	—	—
2019–20	Colorado Eagles	AHL	24	6	4	10	4	—	—	—	—	—
2020–21	Colorado Eagles	AHL	34	5	8	13	13	2	0	1	1	0
2021–22	Colorado Eagles	AHL	50	10	14	24	16	9	4	1	5	4
2022–23	Colorado Eagles	AHL	67	6	11	17	53	7	2	0	2	7
2023–24	Chicago Wolves	AHL	63	3	7	10	28	—	—	—	—	—
AHL totals			294	34	48	82	114	32	6	2	8	13

=== International ===
Year	Team	Event	Result	GP	G	A	Pts	PIM
2013	United States	IH18	2nd place, silver medalist(s)	5	1	0	1	4
Junior totals				5	1	0	1	4
