= Arvid Söderblom =

Swedish ice hockey player (born 1999)

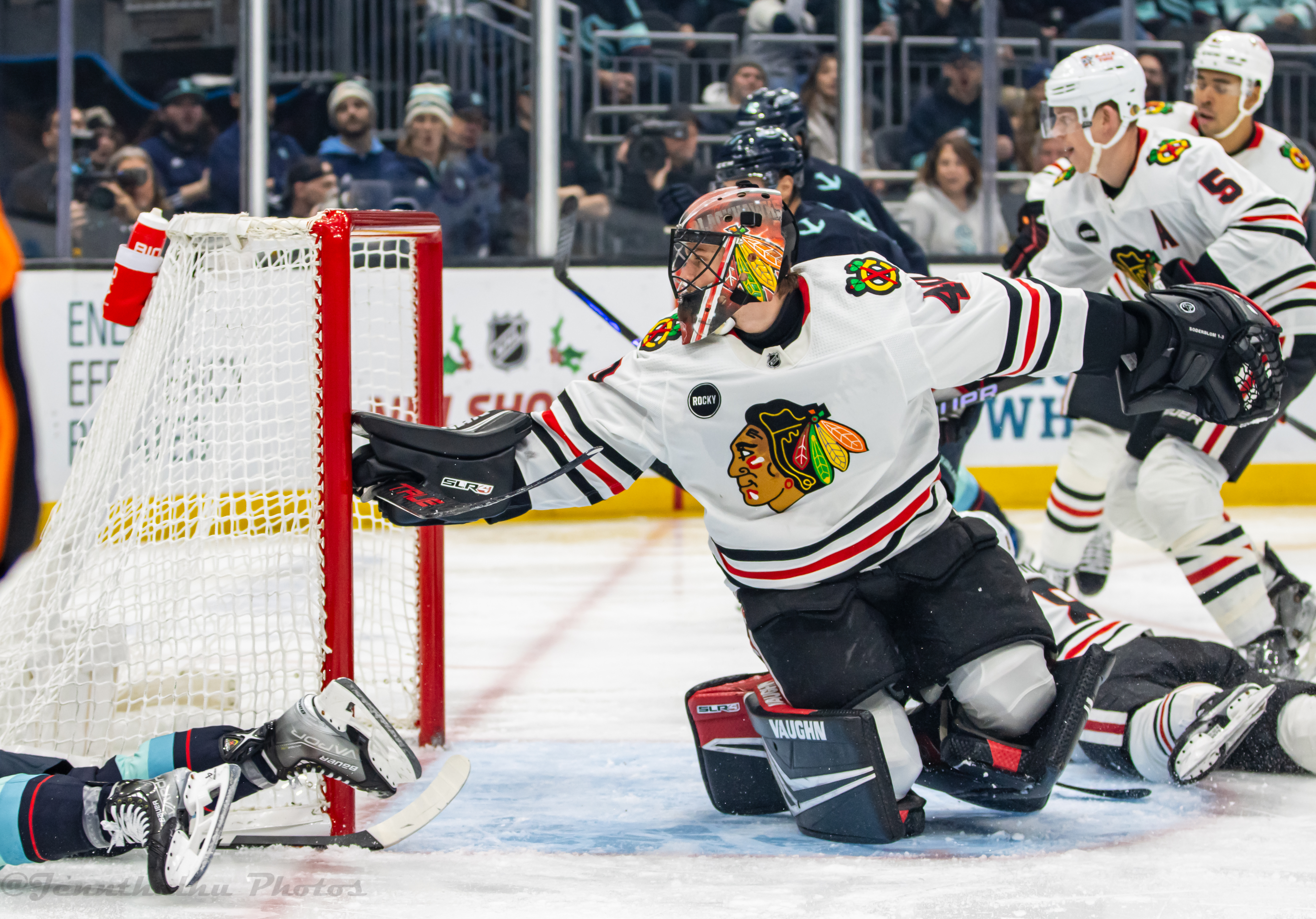
- Söderblom with the Chicago Blackhawks in 2023
- Born: 19 August 1999 (age 27) Gothenburg, Sweden
- Height: 6 ft 3 in (191 cm)
- Weight: 180 lb (82 kg; 12 st 12 lb)
- Position: Goaltender
- Catches: Left
- NHL team (P) Cur. team Former teams: New York Rangers; Hartford Wolf Pack (AHL); Frölunda HC; Skellefteå AIK; Chicago Blackhawks
- National team: Sweden
- NHL draft: Undrafted
- Playing career: 2017–present

Arvid Söderblom (born 19 August 1999) is a Swedish professional ice hockey player who is a goaltender for the Hartford Wolf Pack of the American Hockey League (AHL) while under contract to the New York Rangers of the National Hockey League (NHL). He previously played for the Chicago Blackhawks, as well as Frölunda HC and Skellefteå AIK of the Swedish Hockey League (SHL).

== Playing career ==
On 13 May 2021, Söderblom signed a two-year contract with the Chicago Blackhawks of the NHL.

On 1 January 2022, Söderblom made his NHL debut in a game against the Nashville Predators. He allowed three goals on 18 shots in a 6–1 loss. On 2 January, he made his home debut in a game against the Calgary Flames. He allowed four goals on 41 shots in a 5–1 loss.

On 15 November 2026, Söderblom was traded to the New York Rangers in exchange for Spencer Martin.

== Personal life ==
Söderblom's younger brother, Elmer, is a professional ice hockey player for the Pittsburgh Penguins of the NHL.

== Career statistics ==
Medal record

Men's ice hockey

Representing Sweden

World Championships
Bronze medal – third place	2025 Sweden/Denmark	

=== Regular season and playoffs ===
			Regular season									Playoffs
Season	Team	League	GP	W	L	OT	MIN	GA	SO	GAA	SV%	GP	W	L	MIN	GA	SO	GAA	SV%
2015–16	Frölunda HC	J20	1	1	0	0	60	1	0	1.00	.963	—	—	—	—	—	—	—	—
2016–17	Frölunda HC	J20	29	15	14	0	1,766	73	0	2.48	.905	5	2	3	308	8	1	1.56	.938
2016–17	Frölunda HC	SHL	1	0	0	0	9	0	0	0.00	1.000	—	—	—	—	—	—	—	—
2017–18	Frölunda HC	J20	24	13	11	0	1,346	61	0	2.72	.902	4	2	2	242	12	0	2.98	.890
2017–18	Hanhals IF	Div.1	2	0	2	0	118	5	0	2.53	.928	—	—	—	—	—	—	—	—
2018–19	Hanhals IF	Div.1	37	18	19	0	2,104	111	2	3.16	.908	2	0	2	116	5	0	2.58	.917
2018–19	Frölunda HC	SHL	1	0	0	0	23	2	0	5.17	.800	—	—	—	—	—	—	—	—
2019–20	Tingsryds AIF	Allsv	32	16	14	0	1,865	74	2	2.38	.924	—	—	—	—	—	—	—	—
2020–21	Skellefteå AIK	SHL	22	13	8	0	1,299	44	4	2.03	.921	2	1	1	117	3	0	1.54	.951
2021–22	Rockford IceHogs	AHL	38	21	15	2	2,281	105	2	2.76	.919	5	2	3	281	14	1	2.99	.925
2021–22	Chicago Blackhawks	NHL	3	0	2	0	156	13	0	5.01	.863	—	—	—	—	—	—	—	—
2022–23	Rockford IceHogs	AHL	33	15	12	5	1,870	91	0	2.92	.905	5	2	3	302	16	0	3.18	.895
2022–23	Chicago Blackhawks	NHL	15	2	10	2	836	48	0	3.45	.894	—	—	—	—	—	—	—	—
2023–24	Chicago Blackhawks	NHL	32	5	22	2	1,744	113	0	3.89	.880	—	—	—	—	—	—	—	—
2024–25	Chicago Blackhawks	NHL	36	10	18	7	2,097	111	0	3.18	.898	—	—	—	—	—	—	—	—
2025–26	Chicago Blackhawks	NHL	26	8	13	3	1,469	93	1	3.80	.880	—	—	—	—	—	—	—	—
2026–27	Chicago Blackhawks	NHL	5	0	3	1	269	21	0	4.67	.842	—	—	—	—	—	—	—	—
2026–27	Rockford IceHogs	AHL	2	2	0	0	121	2	1	0.99	.957	—	—	—	—	—	—	—	—
SHL totals			24	13	8	0	1,331	46	4	2.07	.920	2	1	1	117	3	0	1.54	.951
NHL totals			117	25	68	15	6,570	400	1	3.65	.885	—	—	—	—	—	—	—	—

=== International ===
Year	Team	Event	Result	GP	W	L	T	MIN	GA	SO	GAA	SV%
2015	Sweden	U17	3rd place, bronze medalist(s)	2	1	0	0	80	3	1	2.25	.936
2016	Sweden	IH18	4th	2	1	1	0	70	6	0	5.08	.846
2026	Sweden	WC	7th	3	2	1	0	178	5	0	1.69	.891
Junior totals				4	2	1	0	150	9	1	3.60	.895
Senior totals				3	2	1	0	178	5	0	1.69	.891
