= Walker Duehr =

American ice hockey player (born 1997)

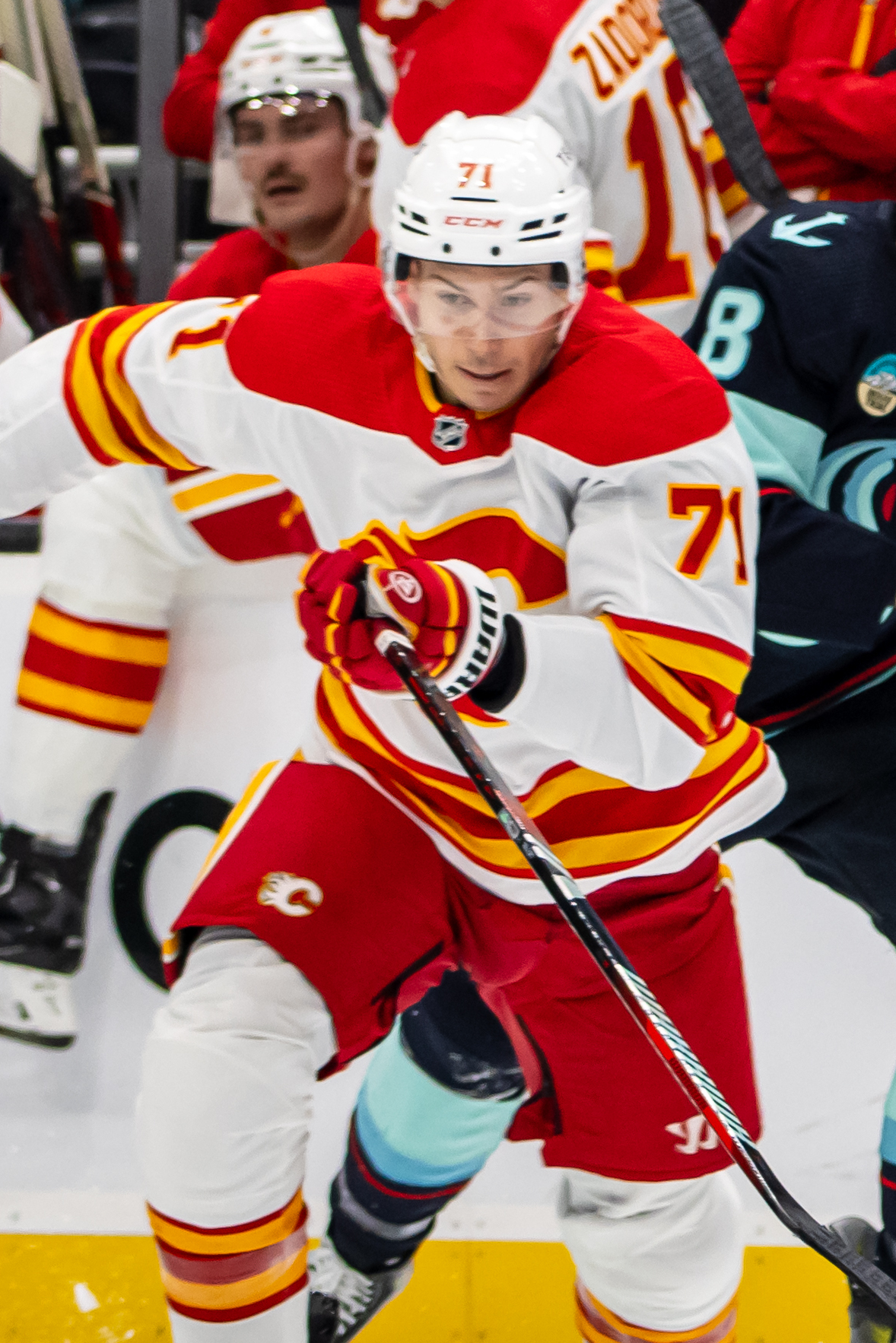
- Duehr with the Calgary Flames in 2023
- Born: November 23, 1997 (age 28) Sioux Falls, South Dakota, U.S.
- Height: 6 ft 2 in (188 cm)
- Weight: 209 lb (95 kg; 14 st 13 lb)
- Position: Right wing
- Shoots: Right
- NHL team (P) Cur. team Former teams: Winnipeg Jets; Manitoba Moose (AHL); Calgary Flames; San Jose Sharks
- NHL draft: Undrafted
- Playing career: 2021–present

Walker Duehr (born November 23, 1997) is an American professional ice hockey winger for the Manitoba Moose in the American Hockey League (AHL) while under contract to the Winnipeg Jets of the National Hockey League (NHL).

== Playing career ==
Upon signing his NHL contract on April 13, 2021, Duehr became the first player from South Dakota to sign an NHL contract with the Calgary Flames. In the following 2021–22 season, he made his NHL debut with the Flames on November 14, against the Ottawa Senators and subsequently became the first South Dakotan to play at the NHL level.

During the 2024–25 season, Duehr was waived by the Flames and claimed by the San Jose Sharks on January 22, 2025.

On July 2, 2025, Duehr was signed as a free agent to a one-year two-way contract by the Winnipeg Jets for the 2025–26 season.

== Career statistics ==
			Regular season					Playoffs
Season	Team	League	GP	G	A	Pts	PIM	GP	G	A	Pts	PIM
2014–15	Sioux City Musketeers	USHL	49	2	5	7	47	5	0	0	0	0
2015–16	Tri-City Storm	USHL	38	10	13	23	16	11	1	3	4	2
2016–17	Chicago Steel	USHL	43	12	15	27	20	—	—	—	—	—
2016–17	Bloomington Thunder	USHL	15	3	4	7	4	—	—	—	—	—
2017–18	Minnesota State	WCHA	8	2	1	3	6	—	—	—	—	—
2018–19	Minnesota State	WCHA	34	10	6	16	24	—	—	—	—	—
2019–20	Minnesota State	WCHA	32	3	12	15	33	—	—	—	—	—
2020–21	Minnesota State	WCHA	28	10	7	17	26	—	—	—	—	—
2020–21	Stockton Heat	AHL	5	0	0	0	0	—	—	—	—	—
2021–22	Stockton Heat	AHL	59	11	12	23	28	13	5	1	6	4
2021–22	Calgary Flames	NHL	1	0	0	0	0	—	—	—	—	—
2022–23	Calgary Wranglers	AHL	41	15	11	26	36	9	0	5	5	10
2022–23	Calgary Flames	NHL	27	7	4	11	4	—	—	—	—	—
2023–24	Calgary Flames	NHL	40	2	5	7	6	—	—	—	—	—
2023–24	Calgary Wranglers	AHL	2	0	1	1	0	—	—	—	—	—
2024–25	Calgary Flames	NHL	16	0	1	1	0	—	—	—	—	—
2024–25	Calgary Wranglers	AHL	20	11	8	19	8	—	—	—	—	—
2024–25	San Jose Sharks	NHL	8	2	0	2	0	—	—	—	—	—
2024–25	San Jose Barracuda	AHL	16	5	4	9	6	4	0	0	0	2
2025–26	Manitoba Moose	AHL	62	17	17	34	18	7	1	2	3	6
2025–26	Winnipeg Jets	NHL	3	0	0	0	0	—	—	—	—	—
NHL totals			95	11	10	21	10	—	—	—	—	—

== Awards and honors ==
Award	Year	Ref
USHL
Clark Cup (Tri-City Storm)	2016	
