= Mackenzie MacEachern =

American ice hockey player (born 1994)

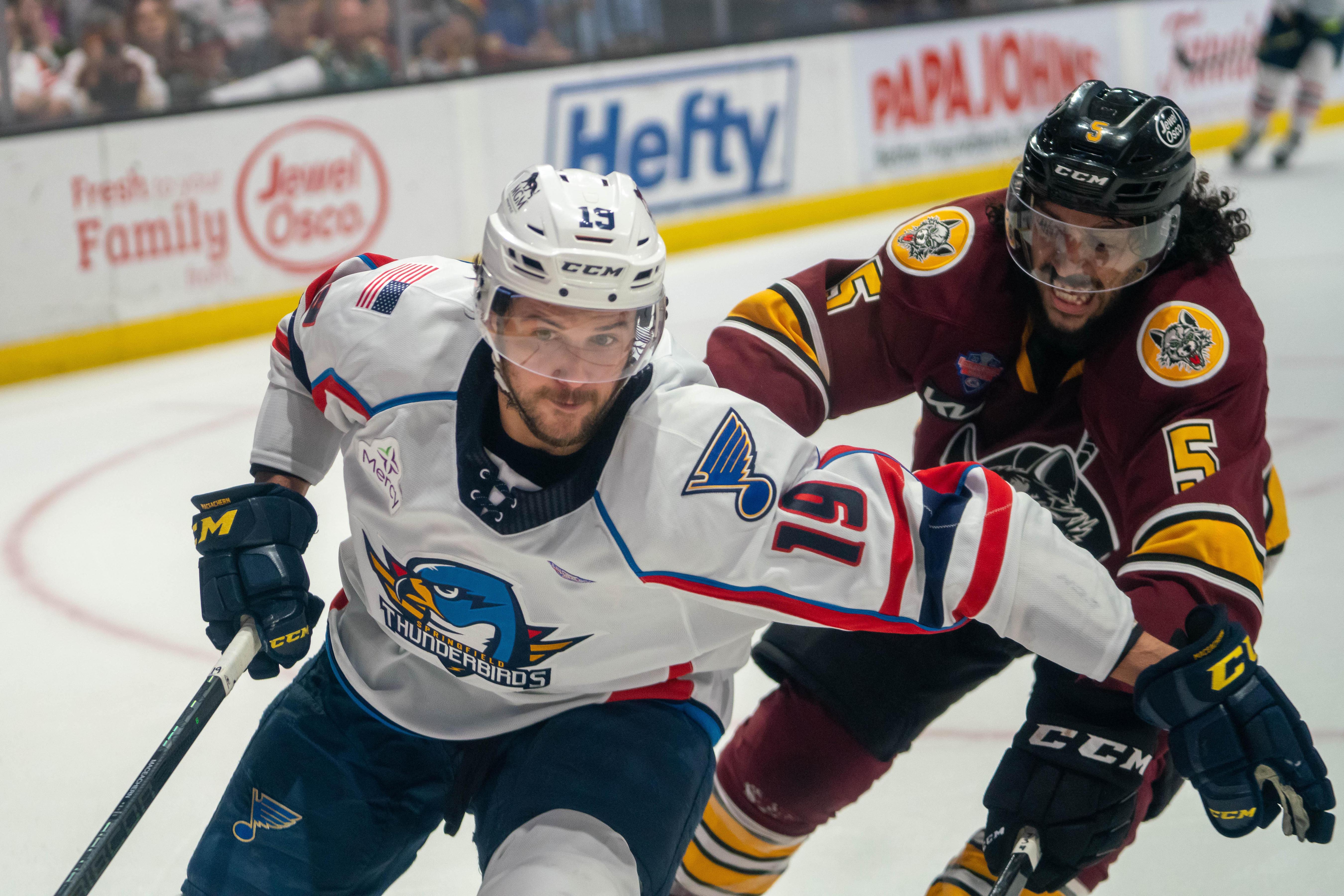
- MacEachern with the Springfield Thunderbirds in 2022
- Born: March 9, 1994 (age 32) Bloomfield Hills, Michigan, U.S.
- Height: 6 ft 2 in (188 cm)
- Weight: 190 lb (86 kg; 13 st 8 lb)
- Position: Left wing
- Shoots: Left
- NHL team (P) Cur. team Former teams: Vancouver Canucks; Abbotsford Canucks (AHL); St. Louis Blues; Carolina Hurricanes
- NHL draft: 67th overall, 2012; St. Louis Blues
- Playing career: 2016–present

Mackenzie MacEachern (Scottish Gaelic: [məkˈɛçərn]; born March 9, 1994) is an American ice hockey winger currently playing for the Abbotsford Canucks in the American Hockey League (AHL) while under contract to the Vancouver Canucks in the National Hockey League (NHL). He was drafted in the third round, 67th overall, by the Blues in the 2012 NHL entry draft. MacEachern spent three seasons at Michigan State.

== Playing career ==
=== Collegiate ===
After graduating from Brother Rice High School, MacEachern was drafted in the third round, 67th overall by the St. Louis Blues in the 2012 NHL entry draft. He played one season for the Chicago Steel in the United States Hockey League. While with the Steel, MacEachern committed to Michigan State University. In his freshman season with the Michigan State Spartans, he played in 36 games and finished second amongst the teams rookies in points.

He scored his first collegiate hat trick in a 3–2 win over Penn State on February 14, 2015. At the conclusion of the season, he was awarded Academic All-Big Ten Honors.

His junior season was his most productive. He led the team with 30 points and 14 goals, while his 16 assists tied for second. At the conclusion of the season he was awarded Academic All-Big Ten Honors. On March 30, 2016, he chose to forego his senior season at Michigan State and sign a two-year entry-level contract with the St. Louis Blues.

=== Professional ===
MacEachern began his professional career during the 2016–17 season with the Blues' American Hockey League (AHL) affiliate, the Chicago Wolves. In his first season, MacEachern recorded 11 points in 55 games. He had another three points for the club during ten postseason games.

On July 3, 2018, MacEachern signed a one-year, two-way contract with the Blues. He began the 2018–19 season with the Blues' new American League affiliate, the San Antonio Rampage. On January 9, 2019, MacEachern scored two goals in an eventual 5–4 win over the Iowa Wild, helping the Rampage set a new franchise record for most consecutive home wins.

On January 10, 2019, MacEachern was recalled by the Blues. He made his NHL debut that night, skating seven shifts in a 4-1 win over the Montreal Canadiens. On January 25, he scored his first career NHL goal in a 4–3 loss to the Los Angeles Kings. On February 9, 2019, the Blues signed MacEachern to a one-year, one-way contract extension. The Blues won the 2019 Stanley Cup, although MacEachern did not skate in any playoff games. However, MacEachern did receive his day with the trophy.

On April 17, 2020, the Blues signed MacEachern to a two-year, $1.8 million contract extension.

As a free agent from the Blues, MacEachern was signed to a one-year, two-way contract with the Carolina Hurricanes on July 15, 2022.

On July 1, 2023, MacEachern signed as a free agent to a two-year, one-way $1.55 million contract to return to the Blues. He made 8 appearances at the NHL level with the Blues, registering 1 assist, through the 2023–24 season, spending the majority of his contract in the AHL with the Springfield Thunderbirds.

On July 1, 2025, having concluded his second tenure with the Blues at the expiration of his contract, MacEachern was signed to a two-year, two-way contract with the Vancouver Canucks.

== Career statistics ==
			Regular season					Playoffs
Season	Team	League	GP	G	A	Pts	PIM	GP	G	A	Pts	PIM
2010–11	Brother Rice High	CHSL	30	34	36	70	18	—	—	—	—	—
2011–12	Brother Rice High	CHSL	29	42	48	90	16	—	—	—	—	—
2012–13	Chicago Steel	USHL	50	8	13	21	35	—	—	—	—	—
2013–14	Michigan State	B1G	36	8	4	12	14	—	—	—	—	—
2014–15	Michigan State	B1G	35	11	15	26	10	—	—	—	—	—
2015–16	Michigan State	B1G	37	14	16	30	20	—	—	—	—	—
2016–17	Chicago Wolves	AHL	55	5	6	11	8	10	2	1	3	4
2017–18	Chicago Wolves	AHL	46	6	4	10	25	—	—	—	—	—
2018–19	San Antonio Rampage	AHL	33	9	7	16	18	—	—	—	—	—
2018–19	St. Louis Blues	NHL	29	3	2	5	10	—	—	—	—	—
2019–20	St. Louis Blues	NHL	51	7	3	10	33	5	0	0	0	6
2020–21	St. Louis Blues	NHL	21	1	1	2	8	—	—	—	—	—
2021–22	Springfield Thunderbirds	AHL	47	12	13	25	51	18	6	7	13	6
2021–22	St. Louis Blues	NHL	14	0	2	2	4	—	—	—	—	—
2022–23	Chicago Wolves	AHL	37	11	19	30	12	—	—	—	—	—
2022–23	Carolina Hurricanes	NHL	—	—	—	—	—	8	1	1	2	6
2023–24	Springfield Thunderbirds	AHL	34	6	13	19	14	—	—	—	—	—
2023–24	St. Louis Blues	NHL	8	0	1	1	0	—	—	—	—	—
2024–25	Springfield Thunderbirds	AHL	40	12	20	32	54	—	—	—	—	—
2025–26	Abbotsford Canucks	AHL	21	6	2	8	8	—	—	—	—	—
2025–26	Vancouver Canucks	NHL	8	1	3	4	12	—	—	—	—	—
NHL totals			131	12	12	24	67	13	1	1	2	12
