= Andrew Nielsen =

Andrew Nielsen could refer to:

- MC Lars (Andrew Robert Nielsen, born 1982), American rapper and podcaster
- Andrew Nielsen (ice hockey) (born 1996), Canadian ice hockey defenceman
