= 2015–16 WHL season =

- League: Western Hockey League
- Sport: Ice hockey
- Duration: Regular season September 24, 2015 – March 22, 2016; Playoffs; March 24, 2016 – May 13, 2016
- Teams: 22
- TV partner(s): Shaw TV, Rogers Sportsnet, Root Sports Northwest

Regular season
- Scotty Munro Memorial Trophy: Victoria Royals (1)
- Season MVP: Dryden Hunt (Moose Jaw Warriors)
- Top scorer: Adam Brooks (Regina Pats)

Playoffs
- Playoffs MVP: Nolan Patrick (Wheat Kings)
- Finals champions: Brandon Wheat Kings (3)
- Runners-up: Seattle Thunderbirds

WHL seasons
- 2014–15 2016–17

2015–16 CHL season
- League: Canadian Hockey League
- Sport: Ice hockey
- Duration: OHL; September 2015 – March 2016; QMJHL; September 2015 – March 2016; WHL; September 2015 – March 2016
- Teams: 60
- TV partner(s): RDS, Rogers Sportsnet, Rogers TV, Shaw TV
- Season MVP: Mitch Marner (London Knights) (OHL)
- Top scorer: Conor Garland (Moncton Wildcats) (QMJHL)

Memorial Cup
- Finals champions: London Knights (OHL) (2nd title)
- Runners-up: Rouyn-Noranda Huskies (QMJHL)

The 2015–16 WHL season was the 50th season of the Western Hockey League (WHL). The regular season began on September 24, 2015, and ended with the Eastern Conference tiebreaker game on March 22, 2016. The Victoria Royals won their first Scotty Munro Memorial Trophy for best regular season record, becoming the first team based in Victoria to win the title since the 1980–81 Victoria Cougars. The playoffs began on March 24, 2016, and ended on May 13, 2016. The Brandon Wheat Kings won their third Ed Chynoweth Cup—their first since 1995–96—and a berth in the 2016 Memorial Cup tournament, which was held at the ENMAX Centrium in Red Deer, Alberta from May 19 to 29, 2016. The Red Deer Rebels qualified for the tournament as hosts.

== Standings ==
Map of WHL, 2011–12 to 2018–19
East Division
Central Division
BC Division
US Division

East Division
Pos	Team	Pld	W	L	OTL	SOL	GF	GA	Pts
1	x, y – Brandon Wheat Kings	72	48	18	4	2	319	197	102
2	x – Prince Albert Raiders	72	38	26	7	1	222	223	84
3	x – Moose Jaw Warriors	72	36	27	7	2	249	239	81

x – clinched playoff spot; y – clinched division

Central Division: Top 3
Pos	Team	Pld	W	L	OTL	SOL	GF	GA	Pts
1	x, y – Lethbridge Hurricanes	72	46	24	1	1	304	218	94
2	x – Red Deer Rebels	72	45	24	1	2	260	205	93
3	x – Calgary Hitmen	72	42	26	2	2	246	219	88

x – clinched playoff spot; y – clinched division

Wild Card teams: Top 2 qualify for playoffs
Pos	Div	Team	Pld	W	L	OTL	SOL	GF	GA	Pts
1	East	x – Regina Pats	72	36	28	3	5	243	253	80
2	Cen.	x – Edmonton Oil Kings	72	29	36	6	1	197	238	65
3	Cen.	Medicine Hat Tigers	72	30	37	3	2	223	287	65
4	East	Swift Current Broncos	72	24	38	7	3	189	249	58
5	East	Saskatoon Blades	72	26	42	4	0	219	318	56
6	Cen.	Kootenay Ice	72	12	53	6	1	155	320	31

x – clinched playoff spot

B.C. Division
Pos	Team	Pld	W	L	OTL	SOL	GF	GA	Pts
1	x, y, z – Victoria Royals	72	50	16	3	3	281	166	106
2	x – Kelowna Rockets	72	48	20	4	0	269	218	100
3	x – Kamloops Blazers	72	38	25	5	4	237	218	85

x – clinched playoff spot; y – clinched division; z – clinched regular season title

U.S. Division
Pos	Team	Pld	W	L	OTL	SOL	GF	GA	Pts
1	x, y – Seattle Thunderbirds	72	45	23	4	0	228	186	94
2	x – Everett Silvertips	72	38	26	5	3	182	172	84
3	x – Portland Winterhawks	72	34	31	6	1	228	227	75

x – clinched playoff spot; y – clinched division

Wild Card Teams: Top 2 qualify for playoffs
Pos	Div	Team	Pld	W	L	OTL	SOL	GF	GA	Pts
1	B.C.	x – Prince George Cougars	72	36	31	3	2	240	225	77
2	U.S.	x – Spokane Chiefs	72	33	30	5	4	223	245	75
3	U.S.	Tri-City Americans	72	35	34	2	1	236	253	73
4	B.C.	Vancouver Giants	72	23	40	5	4	199	273	55

x – clinched playoff spot

== Eastern Conference Tiebreaker ==
=== Medicine Hat Tigers vs. Edmonton Oil Kings ===
March 22	Medicine Hat Tigers	4 – 6	Edmonton Oil Kings	Canalta Centre	Recap
4:02 - Caleb Fantillo (1); 5:02 - Chad Butcher (1)		First period	Luke Bertolucci (1) - sh - 8:23; Luke Bertolucci (2) - 10:34; Brett Pollock (1) - pp - 18:25
No scoring		Second period	No scoring
7:31 - Mark Rassell (1); 8:26 - Mason Shaw (1)		Third period	Andrew Koep (1) - 1:54; Dario Meyer (1) - pp - 12:05; Brandon Baddock (1) - en - 19:53
Nick Schneider (30 saves / 35 shots)		Goalie stats	Payton Lee (39 saves / 43 shots)

Edmonton claims final playoff spot

== Statistical leaders ==
=== Scoring leaders ===
Players are listed by points, then goals.

Note: GP = Games played; G = Goals; A = Assists; Pts. = Points; PIM = Penalty minutes

Player	Team	GP	G	A	Pts	PIM
Adam Brooks	Regina Pats	72	38	82	120	30
Dryden Hunt	Moose Jaw Warriors	72	58	58	116	48
Brayden Burke	Lethbridge Hurricanes	72	27	82	109	44
Jayce Hawryluk	Brandon Wheat Kings	58	47	59	106	101
Nolan Patrick	Brandon Wheat Kings	72	41	61	102	41
Parker Bowles	Tri-City Americans	72	39	57	96	63
Tyson Baillie	Kelowna Rockets	70	43	52	95	66
Reid Gardiner	Prince Albert Raiders	71	43	49	92	46
Alex Forsberg	Victoria Royals	71	31	60	91	64
Tyler Wong	Lethbridge Hurricanes	72	43	46	89	42

=== Leading goaltenders ===
These are the goaltenders that lead the league in GAA that have played at least 1380 minutes.

Note: GP = Games played; Mins = Minutes played; W = Wins; L = Losses; OTL = Overtime losses; SOL = Shootout losses; SO = Shutouts; GAA = Goals against average; Sv% = Save percentage

Player	Team	GP	Mins	W	L	OTL	SOL	SO	GAA	SV%
Griffen Outhouse	Victoria Royals	27	1487	18	3	3	1	4	1.82	.937
Carter Hart	Everett Silvertips	63	3693	35	23	1	3	6	2.14	.918
Coleman Vollrath	Victoria Royals	51	2854	32	13	0	2	1	2.40	.912
Landon Bow	Swift Current/Seattle	53	2886	25	20	4	0	7	2.49	.923
Jackson Whistle	Kelowna Rockets	27	1559	19	6	2	0	2	2.54	.920

== 2016 WHL playoffs ==
Conference Quarter-finals	Conference Semi-finals
E1	Brandon	4
W2	Edmonton	2
E1	Brandon	4
E3	Moose Jaw	1
E2	Prince Albert	1
E3	Moose Jaw	4
Eastern
C1	Lethbridge	1
W1	Regina	4
W1	Regina	3
C2	Red Deer	4
C2	Red Deer	4
C3	Calgary	1
B1	Victoria	4
W2	Spokane	2
B1	Victoria	3
B2	Kelowna	4
B2	Kelowna	4
B3	Kamloops	3
Western
U1	Seattle	4
W1	Prince George	0
U1	Seattle	4
U2	Everett	1
U2	Everett	4
U3	Portland	0

Conference Finals
E1	Brandon	4
C2	Red Deer	1
B2	Kelowna	0
U1	Seattle	4

WHL Championship
E1	Brandon	4
U1	Seattle	1

== Conference Quarter-finals ==
=== Eastern Conference ===
==== (E1) Brandon Wheat Kings vs. (W2) Edmonton Oil Kings ====
March 24	Brandon Wheat Kings	2 – 4	Edmonton Oil Kings	Westman Communications Group Place	Recap
0:09 - Reid Duke (1); 17:16 - Nolan Patrick (1)		First period	Andrew Koep (1) - 1:03
No scoring		Second period	No scoring
No scoring		Third period	Ben Carroll (1) - 2:07; Jesse Roach (1) - 5:20; Brandon Baddock (1) - 12:22
Jordan Papirny (25 saves / 29 shots)		Goalie stats	Payton Lee (39 saves / 41 shots)

March 25	Brandon Wheat Kings	1 – 2	Edmonton Oil Kings	Westman Communications Group Place	Recap
10:03 - sh - John Quenneville (1)		First period	Brandon Baddock (2) - 16:15
No scoring		Second period	No scoring
No scoring		Third period	Brett Pollock (1) - 9:32
Jordan Papirny (23 saves / 25 shots)		Goalie stats	Payton Lee (43 saves / 44 shots)

March 30	Edmonton Oil Kings	1 – 3	Brandon Wheat Kings	Rexall Place	Recap
No scoring		First period	No scoring
10:27 - Lane Bauer (1)		Second period	Connor Gutenberg (1) - 4:04; Nolan Patrick (2) - pp - 18:37
No scoring		Third period	Tyler Coulter (1) - pp - 5:29
Payton Lee (24 saves / 27 shots)		Goalie stats	Jordan Papirny (34 saves / 35 shots)

March 31	Edmonton Oil Kings	0 – 5	Brandon Wheat Kings	Rexall Place	Recap
No scoring		First period	John Quenneville (2) - sh - 9:28; Kale Clague (1) - 12:13
No scoring		Second period	John Quenneville (3) - pp - 3:53
No scoring		Third period	Reid Duke (2) - 3:40; Jayce Hawryluk (1) - pp - 15:57
Payton Lee (31 saves / 36 shots)		Goalie stats	Jordan Papirny (15 saves / 15 shots)

April 3*	Edmonton Oil Kings	2 – 5	Brandon Wheat Kings	Rexall Place	Recap
No scoring		First period	John Quenneville (4) - 4:01
14:34 - pp - Dario Meyer (1)		Second period	Stelio Mattheos (1) - 2:27
9:46 - Tyson Gruninger (1)		Third period	Jordan Thomson (1) - 7:13; Reid Duke (3) - en - 18:56; Jayce Hawryluk (2) - en - 19:23
Payton Lee (28 saves / 31 saves)		Goalie stats	Jordan Papirny (22 saves / 24 shots)

April 5	Brandon Wheat Kings	10 – 3	Edmonton Oil Kings	Westman Communications Group Place	Recap
Reid Duke (4) - 5:46; Ivan Provorov (1) - 10:11; Kale Clague (2) - 19:08		First period	15:53 - pp - Luke Bertolucci (1)
Reid Duke (5) - 3:34; Kale Clague (3) - 5:21; Ty Lewis (1) - 15:44		Second period	7:58 - Brett Pollock (2)
Nolan Patrick (3) - 0:25; James Shearer (1) - 8:03; Garrett Armour (1) - pp - 10:33; Stelio Mattheos (2) - pp - 16:56		Third period	14:43 - sh - Lane Bauer (2)
Jordan Papirny (21 saves / 24 shots)		Goalie stats	Payton Lee (57 saves / 67 shots)

Brandon won series 4 – 2

* Note: Series was played in a 2-3-2 format due to the Royal Manitoba Winter Fair taking place at the Westman Communications Group Place from March 28 to April 2.

==== (E2) Prince Albert Raiders vs. (E3) Moose Jaw Warriors ====
March 25	Prince Albert Raiders	2 – 3	Moose Jaw Warriors	Art Hauser Centre	Recap
No scoring		First period	No scoring
8:17 - pp - Reid Gardiner (1)		Second period	Brayden Point (1) - pp - 14:17
14:25 - Austin Glover (1)		Third period	Noah Gregor (1) - 8:03; Noah Gregor (2) - 13:51
Rylan Parenteau (36 saves / 39 shots)		Goalie stats	Zach Sawchenko (32 saves / 34 shots)

March 26	Prince Albert Raiders	2 – 4	Moose Jaw Warriors	Art Hauser Centre	Recap
No scoring		First period	Tanner Jeannot (1) - 0:24; Jayden Halbgewachs (1) - 4:48; Brett Howden (1) - 19:29
6:04 - Tim Vanstone (1)		Second period	No scoring
0:54 - Vojtěch Budík (1)		Third period	Brayden Point (2) - 10:07
Rylan Parenteau (26 saves / 30 shots)		Goalie stats	Zach Sawchenko (36 saves / 38 shots)

March 28	Moose Jaw Warriors	3 – 7	Prince Albert Raiders	Mosaic Place	Recap
8:32 - pp - Dryden Hunt (1)		First period	Tim Vanstone (2) - 14:32
14:15 - Jayden Halbgewachs (2)		Second period	Tim Vanstone (3) - 5:50; Kolten Olynek (1) - pp - 13:09
13:08 - pp - Tanner Jeannot (2)		Third period	Luke Coleman (1) - 2:23; Reid Gardiner (2) - pp - 3:42; Jesse Lees (1) - pp - 17:47; Reid Gardiner (3) - en - 19:18
Zach Sawchenko (32 saves / 38 shots)		Goalie stats	Rylan Parenteau (24 saves / 27 saves)

March 29	Moose Jaw Warriors	7 – 0	Prince Albert Raiders	Mosaic Place	Recap
8:31 - Dryden Hunt (2); 9:03 - Josh Brook (1); 10:06 - pp - Brett Howden (2)		First period	No scoring
7:25 - Dryden Hunt (3); 7:42 - Dryden Hunt (4)		Second period	No scoring
13:18 - Jesse Shynkaruk (1); 17:56 - pp - Jayden Halbgewachs (3)		Third period	No scoring
Zach Sawchenko (26 saves / 26 shots)		Goalie stats	Rylan Parenteau (17 saves / 21 shots); Ian Scott (12 saves / 15 shots)

April 1	Prince Albert Raiders	0 – 5	Moose Jaw Warriors	Art Hauser Centre	Recap
No scoring		First period	Dryden Hunt (5) - pp - 5:06
No scoring		Second period	Tanner Jeannot (3) - pp - 4:42; Brett Howden (3) - pp - 4:59
No scoring		Third period	Dryden Hunt (6) - 1:18; Tanner Jeannot (4) - 3:48
Rylan Parenteau (26 saves / 31 shots)		Goalie stats	Zach Sawchenko (36 saves / 36 shots)

Moose Jaw won series 4 – 1

==== (C1) Lethbridge Hurricanes vs. (W1) Regina Pats ====
March 25	Lethbridge Hurricanes	6 – 3	Regina Pats	ENMAX Centre	Recap
1:54 - pp - Cory Millette (1); 14:07 - pp - Brayden Burke (1)		First period	Adam Brooks (1) - pp - 18:57
16:21 - Carter Folk (1)		Second period	Austin Wagner (1) - 4:16; Connor Hobbs (1) - 9:27
0:41 - Brayden Burke (2); 5:54 - pp - Cory Millette (2); 15:20 - pp - Kord Pankewicz (1)		Third period	No scoring
Stuart Skinner (26 saves / 29 shots)		Goalie stats	Tyler Brown (31 saves / 37 shots)

March 26	Lethbridge Hurricanes	0 – 3	Regina Pats	ENMAX Centre	Recap
No scoring		First period	No scoring
No scoring		Second period	Adam Brooks (2) - 4:13
No scoring		Third period	Adam Brooks (3) - 1:35; Sam Steel (1) - en - 18:34
Stuart Skinner (25 saves / 27 shots)		Goalie stats	Tyler Brown (27 saves / 27 shots)

March 29	Regina Pats	3 – 2	Lethbridge Hurricanes	Brandt Centre	Recap
No scoring		First period	Giorgio Estephan (1) - sh - 7:21
16:38 - pp - Cole Sanford (1)		Second period	No scoring
10:27 - pp - Sam Steel (2); 14:11 - Rykr Cole (1)		Third period	Andrew Nielsen (1) - pp - 18:04
Tyler Brown (30 saves / 32 shots)		Goalie stats	Stuart Skinner (19 saves / 22 shots)

March 30	Regina Pats	2 – 0	Lethbridge Hurricanes	Brandt Centre	Recap
19:12 - Cole Sanford (2)		First period	No scoring
No scoring		Second period	No scoring
18:48 - en - Adam Brooks (4)		Third period	No scoring
Tyler Brown (32 saves / 32 shots)		Goalie stats	Jayden Sittler (24 saves / 25 shots)

April 1	Lethbridge Hurricanes	2 – 7	Regina Pats	ENMAX Centre	Recap
No scoring		First period	Sam Steel (3) - 1:24; Lane Zablocki (1) - 2:59; Sam Steel (4) - sh - 10:22; Lane Zablocki (2) - 15:05
5:53 - pp - Tyler Wong (1)		Second period	No scoring
3:46 - Giorgio Estephan (2)		Third period	Austin Wagner (2) - 7:11; Adam Brooks (5) - pp - 8:05; Cole Sanford (3) - en - 12:06
Stuart Skinner (5 saves / 9 shots); Jayden Sittler (23 saves / 25 shots)		Goalie stats	Tyler Brown (23 saves / 25 shots)

Regina won series 4 – 1

==== (C2) Red Deer Rebels vs (C3) Calgary Hitmen ====
March 25	Red Deer Rebels	3 – 1	Calgary Hitmen	ENMAX Centrium	Recap
2:48 - Jeff de Wit (1)		First period	No scoring
No scoring		Second period	No scoring
15:11 - Adam Helewka (1); 19:55 - en - Adam Helewka (2)		Third period	Keegan Kanzig (1) - 14:20
Trevor Martin (32 saves / 33 shots)		Goalie stats	Cody Porter (23 saves / 25 shots)

March 26	Red Deer Rebels	2 – 5	Calgary Hitmen	ENMAX Centrium	Recap
11:26 - pp - Adam Helewka (3)		First period	Beck Malenstyn (1) - 6:47
5:37 - Evan Polei (1)		Second period	Jakob Stukel (1) - pp - 2:32; Travis Sanheim (1) - 4:21; Jordy Stallard (1) - pp - 8:50
No scoring		Third period	Pavel Karnaukhov (1) - en - 18:58
Trevor Martin (30 saves / 34 shots)		Goalie stats	Cody Porter (35 saves / 37 shots)

March 27	Calgary Hitmen	3 – 4	Red Deer Rebels	Scotiabank Saddledome	Recap
3:04 - pp - Jordy Stallard (2); 15:27 - Beck Malenstyn (2)		First period	Evan Polei (2) - 15:51
No scoring		Second period	Jake DeBrusk (1) - 2:08
14:02 - Jakob Stukel (2)		Third period	Jake DeBrusk (2) - 1:16; Evan Polei (3) - 18:16
Cody Porter (14 saves / 18 shots)		Goalie stats	Trevor Martin (22 saves / 25 shots)

April 1	Calgary Hitmen	0 – 2	Red Deer Rebels	Scotiabank Saddledome	Recap
No scoring		First period	Luke Philp (1) - 4:08
No scoring		Second period	No scoring
No scoring		Third period	Jake DeBrusk (3) - 17:35
Cody Porter (30 saves / 32 shots)		Goalie stats	Trevor Martin (30 saves / 30 shots)

April 2	Red Deer Rebels	5 – 3	Calgary Hitmen	ENMAX Centrium	Recap
10:01 - Adam Musil (1); 17:04 - pp - Adam Helewka (4)		First period	No scoring
11:26 - pp - Adam Helewka (5)		Second period	Jackson Houck (1) - sh - 5:22; Pavel Karnaukhov (2) - 19:20
3:44 - Grayson Pawlenchuk (1); 4:11 - Jeff de Wit (2)		Third period	Bryce Platt (1) - 5:00
Trevor Martin (26 saves / 29 shots)		Goalie stats	Cody Porter (25 saves / 30 shots)

Red Deer won series 4 – 1

* Note: Game 4 was played at the Stampede Corral due to the 2016 Juno Awards taking place at the Scotiabank Saddledome.

=== Western Conference ===
==== (B1) Victoria Royals vs. (W2) Spokane Chiefs ====
March 25	Victoria Royals	5 – 3	Spokane Chiefs	Save-On-Foods Memorial Centre	Recap
14:51 - Tyler Soy (1)		First period	No scoring
9:16 - Joe Hicketts (1)		Second period	Keanu Yamamoto (1) - 5:24
5:58 - Logan Fisher (1); 11:59 - pp - Dante Hannoun (1); 17:30 - en - Tyler Soy (2)		Third period	Hudson Elynuik (1) - pp - 0:44; Hayden Ostir (1) - 19:07
Coleman Vollrath (24 saves / 27 shots)		Goalie stats	Lasse Petersen (26 saves / 30 shots)

March 26	Victoria Royals	4 – 3	Spokane Chiefs	Save-On-Foods Memorial Centre	Recap
12:32 - Jack Walker (1); 14:08 - Jared Dmytriw (1)		First period	Jacob Cardiff (1) - 9:56
17:27 - Jack Walker (2)		Second period	Hudson Elynuik (2) - 4:12
6:31 - Tyler Soy (3)		Third period	Jacob Cardiff (2) - 17:54
Coleman Vollrath (30 saves / 33 shots)		Goalie stats	Lasse Petersen (17 saves / 21 shots)

March 29	Spokane Chiefs	5 – 2	Victoria Royals	Spokane Veterans Memorial Arena	Recap
7:26 - Jason Fram (1); 17:39 - Jordan Henderson (1)		First period	No scoring
9:06 - pp - Hudson Elynuik (3); 16:10 - pp - Presten Kopeck (1); 16:39 - Jaret Anderson-Dolan (1)		Second period	No scoring
No scoring		Third period	Matthew Phillips (1) - pp - 3:40; Scott Walford (1) - 18:02
Lasse Petersen (22 saves / 24 shots)		Goalie stats	Coleman Vollrath (32 saves / 37 shots)

March 30	Spokane Chiefs	2 – 3	OT	Victoria Royals	Spokane Veterans Memorial Arena	Recap
4:09 - Dominic Zwerger (1)		First period		Matthew Phillips (2) - pp - 9:51
8:00 - pp - Presten Kopeck (2)		Second period		Alex Forsberg (1) - 9:08
No scoring		Third period		No scoring
No scoring		First overtime period		Alex Forsberg (2) - 8:41
Lasse Petersen (23 saves / 26 shots)		Goalie stats		Griffen Outhouse (30 saves / 32 shots)

April 1	Spokane Chiefs	4 – 1	Victoria Royals	Spokane Veterans Memorial Arena	Recap
Kailer Yamamoto (1) - pp - 7:18; Curtis Miske (1) - 17:26		First period	18:10 - Jack Walker (3)
Jacob Cardiff (3) - 6:28		Second period	No scoring
Keanu Yamamoto (2) - sh - 7:29		Third period	No scoring
Lasse Petersen (44 saves / 45 shots)		Goalie stats	Griffen Outhouse (19 saves / 23 shots)

April 3	Victoria Royals	6 – 2	Spokane Chiefs	Save-On-Foods Memorial Centre	Recap
Jack Walker (4) - pp - 9:19; Tyler Soy (4) - pp - 12:18; Scott Walford (2) - 17:47		First period	3:40 - Jordan Henderson (2)
Tyler Soy (5) - 4:01		Second period	No scoring
Matthew Phillips (3) - 13:54; Jack Walker (5) - pp - 17:01		Third period	10:22 - Keanu Yamamoto (3)
Griffen Outhouse (24 saves / 26 shots)		Goalie stats	Lasse Petersen (19 saves / 25 shots)

Victoria won series 4 – 2

==== (B2) Kelowna Rockets vs. (B3) Kamloops Blazers ====
March 25	Kelowna Rockets	3 – 2	Kamloops Blazers	Prospera Place	Recap
15:48 - Lucas Johansen (1)		First period	No scoring
6:20 - Dillon Dubé (1); 7:07 - Lucas Johansen (2)		Second period	Gage Quinney (1) - 12:32
No scoring		Third period	Collin Shirley (1) - 19:05
Michael Herringer (19 saves / 21 shots)		Goalie stats	Connor Ingram (33 saves / 36 shots)

March 26	Kelowna Rockets	4 – 5	Kamloops Blazers	Prospera Place	Recap
0:25 - Tomáš Šoustal (1)		First period	Ryan Rehill (1) - pp - 18:19
2:29 - Rourke Chartier (1); 9:37 - pp - Rodney Southam (1)		Second period	No scoring
14:33 - Tomáš Šoustal (2)		Third period	Garrett Pilon (1) - pp - 6:53; Dawson Davidson (1) - pp - 10:15; Collin Shirley (2) - 19:29; Ryan Rehill (2) - 19:55
Michael Herringer (39 saves / 44 shots)		Goalie stats	Connor Ingram (40 saves / 44 shots)

March 29*	Kamloops Blazers	0 – 1	Kelowna Rockets	Sandman Centre	Recap
No scoring		First period	No scoring
No scoring		Second period	Justin Kirkland (1) - 1:45
No scoring		Third period	No scoring
Connor Ingram (36 saves / 37 shots)		Goalie stats	Michael Herringer (40 saves / 40 shots)

March 30	Kamloops Blazers	5 – 1	Kelowna Rockets	Sandman Centre	Recap
3:55 - Dallas Valentine (1); 5:02 - Quinn Benjafield (1); 17:45 - Collin Shirley (3)		First period	Calvin Thürkauf (1) - 15:03
7:58 - Matt Revel (1)		Second period	No scoring
13:33 - Collin Shirley (4)		Third period	No scoring
Connor Ingram (37 saves / 38 shots)		Goalie stats	Michael Herringer (24 saves / 28 shots); Brodan Salmond (9 saves / 10 shots)

April 1	Kelowna Rockets	4 – 0	Kamloops Blazers	Prospera Place	Recap
7:35 - pp - Rodney Southam (2)		First period	No scoring
2:35 - Rodney Southam (3); 7:06 - pp - Rourke Chartier (2); 11:36 - Rodney Southam (4)		Second period	No scoring
No scoring		Third period	No scoring
Michael Herringer (42 saves / 42 shots)		Goalie stats	Connor Ingram (24 saves / 28 shots)

April 2	Kamloops Blazers	4 – 0	Kelowna Rockets	Sandman Centre	Recap
7:55 - pp - Gage Quinney (2)		First period	No scoring
4:20 - pp - Gage Quinney (3); 9:11 - Collin Shirley (5)		Second period	No scoring
12:21 - Garrett Pilon (2)		Third period	No scoring
Connor Ingram (26 saves / 26 shots)		Goalie stats	Michael Herringer (10 saves / 13 shots); Brodan Salmond (19 saves / 20 shots)

April 4	Kelowna Rockets	2 – 1	OT	Kamloops Blazers	Prospera Place	Recap
3:37 - Justin Kirkland (2)		First period		No scoring
No scoring		Second period		Nick Chyzowski (1) - pp - 17:03
No scoring		Third period		No scoring
7:07 - Tomáš Šoustal (3)		First overtime period		No scoring
Michael Herringer (24 saves / 25 shots)		Goalie stats		Connor Ingram (32 saves / 34 shots)

Kelowna won series 4 – 3

* Note: Game 3 was played at the Kamloops Memorial Arena due to the 2016 IIHF Women's World Championship being played at the Sandman Centre.

==== (U1) Seattle Thunderbirds vs. (W1) Prince George Cougars ====
March 25	Seattle Thunderbirds	3 – 2	OT	Prince George Cougars	ShoWare Center	Recap
No scoring		First period		No scoring
18:09 - Donovan Neuls (1)		Second period		Jesse Gabrielle (1) - pp - 6:51
16:34 - Alexander True (1)		Third period		Jansen Harkins (1) - pp - 19:31
11:50 - Cavin Leth (1)		First overtime period		No scoring
Landon Bow (17 saves / 19 shots)		Goalie stats		Ty Edmonds (47 saves / 50 shots)

March 26	Seattle Thunderbirds	4 – 1	Prince George Cougars	ShoWare Center	Recap
No scoring		First period	No scoring
8:45 - Keegan Kolesar (1); 15:43 - Ethan Bear (1)		Second period	Chase Witala (1) - 14:29
5:14 - Keegan Kolesar (2); 19:27 - en - Scott Eansor (1)		Third period	No scoring
Landon Bow (17 saves / 18 shots)		Goalie stats	Ty Edmonds (40 saves / 43 shots)

March 29	Prince George Cougars	0 – 5	Seattle Thunderbirds	CN Centre	Recap
No scoring		First period	Nic Holowko (1) - 3:07; Keegan Kolesar (3) - 9:27
No scoring		Second period	Alexander True (2) - pp - 3:31
No scoring		Third period	Cavin Leth (2) - 1:49; Cavin Leth (3) - pp - 6:29
Ty Edmonds (7 saves / 10 shots); Nick McBride (22 saves / 24 shots)		Goalie stats	Landon Bow (27 saves / 27 shots)

March 30	Prince George Cougars	3 – 4	OT	Seattle Thunderbirds	CN Centre	Recap
14:04 - Jansen Harkins (2)		First period		Scott Eansor (2) - 4:30; Nolan Volcan (1) - 7:39
11:07 - Chase Witala (2); 13:41 - pp - Jared Bethune (1)		Second period		No scoring
No scoring		Third period		Ethan Bear (2) - pp - 9:20
No scoring		First overtime period		Nolan Volcan (2) - 0:34
Ty Edmonds (35 saves / 39 shots)		Goalie stats		Landon Bow (21 saves / 24 shots)

Seattle won series 4 – 0

==== (U2) Everett Silvertips vs. (U3) Portland Winterhawks ====
March 25	Everett Silvertips	3 – 0	Portland Winterhawks	Xfinity Arena	Recap
No scoring		First period	No scoring
14:52 - Brandon Ralph (1); 18:13 - Dawson Leedahl (1)		Second period	No scoring
4:49 - Dawson Leedahl (2)		Third period	No scoring
Mario Petit (29 saves / 29 shots)		Goalie stats	Adin Hill (48 saves / 51 shots)

March 26	Everett Silvertips	3 – 1	Portland Winterhawks	Xfinity Arena	Recap
4:22 - Brandon Ralph (2); 12:40 - Matt Fonteyne (1)		First period	Rihards Bukarts (1) - pp - 2:06
7:14 - Remi Laurencelle (1)		Second period	No scoring
No scoring		Third period	No scoring
Mario Petit (24 saves / 25 shots)		Goalie stats	Adin Hill (34 saves / 37 shots)

March 29	Portland Winterhawks	3 – 5	Everett Silvertips	Moda Center	Recap
No scoring		First period	Patrick Bajkov (1) - 1:04; Dawson Leedahl (3) - 19:42
13:23 - Rihards Bukarts (2); 16:45 - Alex Schoenborn (1); 18:17 - Cody Glass (1)		Second period	Remi Laurencelle (2) - pp - 6:53; Brycen Martin (1) - 15:44
No scoring		Third period	Matt Fonteyne (2) - en - 19:34
Adin Hill (20 saves / 24 shots)		Goalie stats	Mario Petit (28 saves / 31 shots)

March 30	Portland Winterhawks	2 – 4	Everett Silvertips	Moda Center	Recap
17:35 - pp - Blake Heinrich (1)		First period	Cole MacDonald (1) - pp - 12:30
10:18 - pp - Keoni Texeira (1)		Second period	Connor Dewar (1) - 2:42; Cole MacDonald (2) - pp - 19:28
No scoring		Third period	Brandon Ralph (3) - 15:08
Adin Hill (30 saves / 34 shots)		Goalie stats	Carter Hart (28 saves / 30 shots)

Everett won series 4 – 0

== Conference Semi-finals ==
=== Eastern Conference ===
==== (E1) Brandon Wheat Kings vs (E3) Moose Jaw Warriors ====
April 8	Brandon Wheat Kings	5 – 3	Moose Jaw Warriors	Westman Communications Group Place	Recap
7:42 - Kale Clague (4)		First period	Jayden Halbgewachs (4) - pp - 2:23
7:41 - pp - Tyler Coulter (2); 19:17 - John Quenneville (5)		Second period	Noah Gregor (3) - 3:49; Brayden Point (3) - 18:21
13:21 - sh - Tanner Kaspick (1); 18:31 - en - John Quenneville (6)		Third period	No scoring
Jordan Papirny (24 saves / 27 shots)		Goalie stats	Zach Sawchenko (33 saves / 37 shots)

April 9	Brandon Wheat Kings	5 – 2	Moose Jaw Warriors	Westman Communications Group Place	Recap
10:47 - pp - Tim McGauley (1); 18:33 - Duncan Campbell (1)		First period	Brayden Point (4) - 17:43
4:00 - Ivan Provorov (2); 12:17 - Tanner Kaspick (2); 15:29 - James Shearer (2)		Second period	No scoring
No scoring		Third period	Dryden Hunt (7) - pp - 5:13
Jordan Papirny (26 saves / 28 shots)		Goalie stats	Zach Sawchenko (33 saves / 38 shots); Brody Willms (12 saves / 12 shots)

April 12	Moose Jaw Warriors	7 – 1	Brandon Wheat Kings	Mosaic Place	Recap
No scoring		First period	No scoring
10:35 - Jayden Halbgewachs (5); 14:38 - pp - Jayden Halbgewachs (6); 15:57 - Brett Howden (4); 16:39 - Brayden Point (5)		Second period	No scoring
8:21 - Jayden Halbgewachs (7); 17:11 - Tanner Jeannot (5); 19:17 - Nikita Popugaev (1)		Third period	Tim McGauley (2) - 2:59
Zach Sawchenko (34 saves / 35 shots)		Goalie stats	Jordan Papirny (24 saves / 31 shots)

April 13	Moose Jaw Warriors	2 – 6	Brandon Wheat Kings	Mosaic Place	Recap
0:24 - Jayden Halbgewachs (8); 15:54 - pp - Brayden Point (6)		First period	Macoy Erkamps (1) - 6:23; Reid Duke (6) - 8:00; Tim McGauley (3) - pp - 10:54
No scoring		Second period	John Quenneville (7) - 8:22; Nolan Patrick (4) - pp - 14:16
No scoring		Third period	Nolan Patrick (5) - sh - en - 19:15
Zach Sawchenko (25 saves / 30 shots)		Goalie stats	Jordan Papirny (16 saves / 18 shots)

April 15	Brandon Wheat Kings	7 – 3	Moose Jaw Warriors	Westman Communications Group Place	Recap
2:19 - pp - Macoy Erkamps (2); 2:37 - Ty Lewis (2); 6:24 - Tim McGauley (4)		First period	Tanner Jeannot (6) - 14:26
5:13 - Tim McGauley (5); 6:27 - Mitch Wheaton (1)		Second period	Jayden Halbgewachs (9) - 11:37; Nikita Popugaev (2) - pp - 17:46
2:22 – Tyler Coulter (3); 17:23 - en - Tim McGauley (6)		Third period	No scoring
Jordan Papirny (26 saves / 29 shots)		Goalie stats	Zach Sawchenko (29 saves / 35 shots)

Brandon won series 4 – 1

==== (C2) Red Deer Rebels vs (W1) Regina Pats ====
April 9	Red Deer Rebels	3 – 2	Regina Pats	ENMAX Centrium	Recap
No scoring		First period	Colby Williams (1) - pp - 2:14; Cole Sanford (4) - pp - 13:04
12:46 - pp - Adam Helewka (6); 13:14 - pp - Colton Bobyk (1)		Second period	No scoring
7:51 - Evan Polei (4)		Third period	No scoring
Trevor Martin (20 saves / 22 shots)		Goalie stats	Tyler Brown (28 saves / 31 shots)

April 10	Red Deer Rebels	4 – 3	Regina Pats	ENMAX Centrium	Recap
16:57 - pp - Josh Mahura (1)		First period	Sam Steel (5) - pp - 6:22
5:16 - Michael Špaček (1); 17:44 - pp - Adam Helewka (7)		Second period	Cole Sanford (5) - pp - 15:18; Adam Brooks (6) - pp - 19:58
11:18 - Adam Musil (2)		Third period	No scoring
Trevor Martin (28 saves / 32 shots)		Goalie stats	Tyler Brown (35 saves / 38 shots)

April 12	Regina Pats	6 – 3	Red Deer Rebels	Brandt Centre	Recap
18:15 - pp - Jake Leschyshyn (1)		First period	Jake DeBrusk (4) - pp - 16:08
9:10 - Sam Steel (6); 9:47 - Lane Zablocki (3)		Second period	Michael Špaček (2) - 2:02; Nelson Nogier (1) - 14:53
10:26 - pp - Connor Hobbs (2); 10:38 - Rykr Cole (2); 14:43 - sh - Austin Wagner (3)		Third period	No scoring
Tyler Brown (25 saves / 28 shots)		Goalie stats	Trevor Martin (34 saves / 40 shots)

April 13	Regina Pats	6 – 4	Red Deer Rebels	Brandt Centre	Recap
17:18 - pp - Lane Zablocki (4); 18:42 - pp - Connor Hobbs (3)		First period	Austin Strand (1) - 13:13
4:05 - Luc Smith (1); 12:18 - pp - Lane Zablocki (5); 17:07 - pp - Lane Zablocki (6)		Second period	Luke Philp (2) - 19:37
18:42 - en - Cole Sanford (6)		Third period	Nelson Nogier (2) - 4:06; Luke Philp (3) - pp - 10:38
Tyler Brown (44 saves / 48 shots)		Goalie stats	Trevor Martin (18 saves / 22 shots); Rylan Toth (9 saves / 10 shots)

April 15	Red Deer Rebels	5 – 1	Regina Pats	ENMAX Centrium	Recap
3:02 - pp - Haydn Fleury (1)		First period	No scoring
12:26 - Brandon Hagel (1)		Second period	No scoring
3:51 - Josh Mahura (2); 4:42 - Evan Polei (5); 12:38 - Grayson Pawlenchuk (2)		Third period	Sean Richards (1) - 14:53
Rylan Toth (28 saves / 29 shots)		Goalie stats	Tyler Brown (37 saves / 42 shots); Jordan Hollett (4 saves / 4 shots)

April 17	Regina Pats	5 – 1	Red Deer Rebels	Brandt Centre	Recap
2:24 - Jared McAmmond (1)		First period	Jake DeBrusk (5) - 13:20
0:24 - Connor Hobbs (4); 5:36 - Cole Sanford (7); 13:03 - Lane Zablocki (7)		Second period	No scoring
7:07 - Colby Williams (2)		Third period	No scoring
Tyler Brown (20 saves / 21 shots)		Goalie stats	Rylan Toth (35 saves / 40 shots)

April 19	Red Deer Rebels	2 – 1	Regina Pats	ENMAX Centrium	Recap
No scoring		First period	No scoring
14:59 - pp - Adam Helewka (8)		Second period	Adam Brooks (7) - 19:47
12:46 - Adam Musil (3)		Third period	No scoring
Rylan Toth (32 saves / 33 shots)		Goalie stats	Tyler Brown (24 saves / 26 shots)

Red Deer won series 4 – 3

=== Western Conference ===
==== (B1) Victoria Royals vs (B2) Kelowna Rockets ====
April 7	Victoria Royals	2 – 1	Kelowna Rockets	Save-On-Foods Memorial Centre	Recap
4:01 - Jack Walker (6)		First period	Tyson Baillie (1) - 5:04
1:25 - Dante Hannoun (2)		Second period	No scoring
No scoring		Third period	No scoring
Coleman Vollrath (40 saves / 41 shots)		Goalie stats	Michael Herringer (29 saves / 31 shots)

April 9	Victoria Royals	3 – 2	Kelowna Rockets	Save-On-Foods Memorial Centre	Recap
8:19 - pp - Jack Walker (7)		First period	No scoring
16:56 - Regan Nagy (1)		Second period	Tyson Baillie (2) - pp - 6:02
6:33 - pp - Alex Forsberg (3)		Third period	Justin Kirkland (3) - 10:49
Coleman Vollrath (26 saves / 28 shots)		Goalie stats	Michael Herringer (23 saves / 26 shots)

April 12	Kelowna Rockets	3 – 2	Victoria Royals	Prospera Place	Recap
14:29 - pp - Dillon Dubé (2); 18:20 - Rourke Chartier (3)		First period	No scoring
No scoring		Second period	Matthew Phillips (4) - 8:38
10:26 - Tomáš Šoustal (4)		Third period	Alex Forsberg (4) - 18:52
Michael Herringer (30 saves / 32 shots)		Goalie stats	Coleman Vollrath (35 saves / 38 shots)

April 14	Kelowna Rockets	4 – 3	Victoria Royals	Prospera Place	Recap
13:04 - Joe Gatenby (1)		First period	Ethan Price (1) - 10:45
5:04 - Tomáš Šoustal (5)		Second period	Logan Fisher (2) - 5:45
5:21 - pp - Justin Kirkland (4); 19:49 - pp - Cole Linaker (1)		Third period	Logan Fisher (3) - 8:26
Michael Herringer (32 saves / 35 shots)		Goalie stats	Coleman Vollrath (27 saves / 31 shots)

April 15	Victoria Royals	1 – 4	Kelowna Rockets	Save-On-Foods Memorial Centre	Recap
No scoring		First period	No scoring
16:31 - Matthew Phillips (5)		Second period	Rourke Chartier (4) - 12:02
No scoring		Third period	Tyson Baillie (3) - 9:33; Justin Kirkland (5) - pp - 10:41; Rourke Chartier (5) - en - 19:21
Coleman Vollrath (21 saves / 24 shots)		Goalie stats	Michael Herringer (28 saves / 29 shots)

April 17	Kelowna Rockets	2 – 3	Victoria Royals	Prospera Place	Recap
No scoring		First period	Jack Walker (8) - 9:03; Tyler Soy (6) - pp - 17:08
19:43 - Cal Foote (1)		Second period	Regan Nagy (2) - 15:40
3:12 - Justin Kirkland (6)		Third period	No scoring
Michael Herringer (33 saves / 36 shots)		Goalie stats	Coleman Vollrath (25 saves / 27 shots)

April 19	Victoria Royals	2 – 3	OT	Kelowna Rockets	Save-On-Foods Memorial Centre	Recap
1:44 - Tyler Soy (7); 10:31 - pp - Alex Forsberg (5)		First period		No scoring
No scoring		Second period		No scoring
No scoring		Third period		Justin Kirkland (7) - 1:13; Justin Kirkland (8) - 19:59
No scoring		First overtime period		Calvin Thürkauf (2) - 5:56
Coleman Vollrath (22 saves / 25 shots)		Goalie stats		Michael Herringer (28 saves / 30 shots)

Kelowna won series 4 – 3

==== (U1) Seattle Thunderbirds vs (U2) Everett Silvertips ====
April 8	Seattle Thunderbirds	0 – 3	Everett Silvertips	ShoWare Center	Recap
No scoring		First period	No scoring
No scoring		Second period	Remi Laurencelle (3) - 11:00
No scoring		Third period	Matt Fonteyne (3) - pp - 2:11; Remi Laurencelle (4) - 3:37
Landon Bow (26 saves / 29 shots)		Goalie stats	Carter Hart (26 saves / 26 shots)

April 10	Seattle Thunderbirds	3 – 1	Everett Silvertips	ShoWare Center	Recap
10:00 - Mathew Barzal (1)		First period	No scoring
No scoring		Second period	Cole MacDonald (3) - pp - 14:21
4:32 - Mathew Barzal (2); 19:47 - en - Keegan Kolesar (4)		Third period	No scoring
Landon Bow (23 saves / 24 shots)		Goalie stats	Carter Hart (30 saves / 32 shots)

April 13	Everett Silvertips	0 – 5	Seattle Thunderbirds	Xfinity Arena	Recap
No scoring		First period	No scoring
No scoring		Second period	Scott Eansor (3) - 1:39; Ethan Bear (3) - 9:14; Keegan Kolesar (5) - 16:08
No scoring		Third period	Turner Ottenbreit (1) - pp - 14:10; Donovan Neuls (2) - pp - 15:07
Carter Hart (26 saves / 31 shots); Mario Petit (1 save / 1 shot)		Goalie stats	Landon Bow (23 saves / 23 shots)

April 15	Everett Silvertips	1 – 2	Seattle Thunderbirds	Xfinity Arena	Recap
No scoring		First period	Josh Uhrich (1) - 15:05
9:20 - Patrick Bajkov (2)		Second period	Ryan Gropp (1) - 3:08
No scoring		Third period	No scoring
Carter Hart (34 saves / 36 shots)		Goalie stats	Landon Bow (15 saves / 16 shots)

April 16	Seattle Thunderbirds	3 – 2	Everett Silvertips	ShoWare Center	Recap
12:16 - Scott Eansor (4); 15:41 - Nic Holowko (2)		First period	No scoring
11:43 - Ryan Gropp (2)		Second period	Brandon Ralph (4) - 10:11; Devon Skoleski (1) - pp - 18:49
No scoring		Third period	No scoring
Landon Bow (17 saves / 19 shots)		Goalie stats	Carter Hart (39 saves / 42 shots)

Seattle won series 4 – 1

== Conference Finals ==
=== Eastern Conference ===
==== (E1) Brandon Wheat Kings vs. (C2) Red Deer Rebels ====
April 22	Brandon Wheat Kings	4 – 3	OT	Red Deer Rebels	Westman Communications Group Place	Recap
19:33 - John Quenneville (8)		First period		No scoring
No scoring		Second period		No scoring
13:39 - Ivan Provorov (3); 19:16 - Stelio Mattheos (3)		Third period		Evan Polei (6) - pp - 3:39; Adam Helewka (9) - 7:54; Haydn Fleury (2) - 19:55
2:53 - John Quenneville (9)		First overtime period		No scoring
Jordan Papirny (34 saves / 37 shots)		Goalie stats		Rylan Toth (27 saves / 31 shots)

April 23	Brandon Wheat Kings	6 – 4	Red Deer Rebels	Westman Communications Group Place	Recap
17:44 - pp - Tim McGauley (7)		First period	Jake DeBrusk (6) - pp - 13:39
8:30 - Nolan Patrick (6); 11:02 - Kale Clague (5)		Second period	Luke Philp (4) - 0:23
12:21 - Tyler Coulter (4); 14:29 - Nolan Patrick (7); 19:18 - en - John Quenneville (10)		Third period	Colton Bobyk (2) - 10:36; Haydn Fleury (3) - 11:33
Jordan Papirny (29 saves / 33 shots)		Goalie stats	Rylan Toth (35 saves / 40 shots)

April 26	Red Deer Rebels	6 – 2	Brandon Wheat Kings	ENMAX Centrium	Recap
1:51 - Austin Strand (2); 12:44 - Haydn Fleury (4); 12:51 - Braden Purtill (1); 14:46 - Evan Polei (7)		First period	No scoring
11:06 - Jeff de Wit (3)		Second period	Tanner Kaspick (3) - 12:39
11:37 - pp - Michael Špaček (3)		Third period	John Quenneville (11) - pp - 1:34
Rylan Toth (25 saves / 27 shots)		Goalie stats	Jordan Papirny (5 saves / 9 shots); Logan Thompson (23 saves / 25 shots)

April 27	Red Deer Rebels	2 – 4	Brandon Wheat Kings	ENMAX Centrium	Recap
3:54 - Grayson Pawlenchuk (3)		First period	Macoy Erkamps (3) - 5:43; John Quenneville (12) - 16:00
No scoring		Second period	No scoring
0:17 - pp - Jake DeBrusk (7)		Third period	Tim McGauley (8) - 6:36; Tanner Kaspick (4) - en - 19:05
Rylan Toth (39 saves / 42 shots)		Goalie stats	Jordan Papirny (34 saves / 36 shots)

April 29	Brandon Wheat Kings	5 – 2	Red Deer Rebels	Westman Communications Group Place	Recap
10:02 - Nolan Patrick (8)		First period	Jake DeBrusk (8) - 7:16; Evan Polei (8) - 14:23
1:26 - Nolan Patrick (9); 16:19 - Nolan Patrick (10); 19:12 - sh - John Quenneville (13)		Second period	No scoring
12:08 - Kale Clague (6)		Third period	No scoring
Jordan Papirny (24 saves / 26 shots)		Goalie stats	Rylan Toth (26 saves / 31 shots)

Brandon won series 4 – 1

=== Western Conference ===
==== (B2) Kelowna Rockets vs. (U1) Seattle Thunderbirds ====
April 22	Kelowna Rockets	1 – 2	Seattle Thunderbirds	Prospera Place	Recap
No scoring		First period	No scoring
No scoring		Second period	Matthew Barzal (3) - pp - 18:34; Scott Eansor (5) - 19:10
19:38 - pp - Rourke Chartier (6)		Third period	No scoring
Michael Herringer (27 saves / 29 shots)		Goalie stats	Landon Bow (23 saves / 24 shots)

April 23	Kelowna Rockets	2 – 3	Seattle Thunderbirds	Prospera Place	Recap
17:52 - Cole Linaker (2)		First period	Matthew Barzal (4) - pp - 12:50; Scott Eansor (6) - 13:23
15:42 - Rourke Chartier (7)		Second period	No scoring
No scoring		Third period	Scott Eansor (7) - 16:54
Michael Herringer (24 saves / 27 shots)		Goalie stats	Landon Bow (28 saves / 30 shots)

April 26	Seattle Thunderbirds	3 – 1	Kelowna Rockets	ShoWare Center	Recap
14:51 - pp - Bryan Allbee (1)		First period	No scoring
No scoring		Second period	Justin Kirkland (9) - 13:17
0:58 - Ethan Bear (4); 18:31 - sh - en - Matthew Barzal (5)		Third period	No scoring
Landon Bow (36 saves / 37 shots)		Goalie stats	Michael Herringer (30 saves / 32 shots)

April 27	Seattle Thunderbirds	5 – 4	2OT	Kelowna Rockets	ShoWare Center	Recap
No scoring		First period		Rodney Southam (5) - 13:50; Tyson Baillie (4) - 14:15
0:46 - Ryan Gropp (3); 15:08 - Ethan Bear (5)		Second period		Justin Kirkland (10) - 4:59
18:45 - Ethan Bear (6); 19:57 - Keegan Kolesar (6)		Third period		Justin Kirkland (11) - pp - 13:50
7:52 - Matthew Wedman (1)		Second overtime period		No scoring
Landon Bow (28 saves / 32 shots)		Goalie stats		Michael Herringer (71 saves / 76 shots)

Seattle won series 4 – 0

== WHL Championship ==
=== (E1) Brandon Wheat Kings vs. (U1) Seattle Thunderbirds ===
May 6	Brandon Wheat Kings	3 – 2	OT	Seattle Thunderbirds	Westman Communications Group Place	Recap
17:36 - pp - Reid Duke (7)		First period		No scoring
No scoring		Second period		Donovan Neuls (3) - sh - 8:55
4:50 - Nolan Patrick (11)		Third period		Ryan Gropp (4) - pp - 0:28
6:22 - Tanner Kaspick (5)		First overtime period		No scoring
Jordan Papirny (31 saves / 33 shots)		Goalie stats		Landon Bow (29 saves / 32 shots)

May 7	Brandon Wheat Kings	3 – 2	OT	Seattle Thunderbirds	Westman Communications Group Place	Recap
No scoring		First period		No scoring
2:21 - sh - Nolan Patrick (12)		Second period		Donovan Neuls (4) - 1:00
14:40 - Tyler Coulter (5)		Third period		Ethan Bear (7) - pp - 10:30
6:56 - Jayce Hawryluk (2)		First overtime period		No scoring
Jordan Papirny (37 saves / 39 shots)		Goalie stats		Landon Bow (36 saves / 39 shots)

May 10	Seattle Thunderbirds	2 – 3	OT	Brandon Wheat Kings	ShoWare Center	Recap
12:27 - pp - Alexander True (4); 13:05 - pp - Keegan Kolesar (7)		First period		John Quenneville (14) - 5:17
No scoring		Second period		No scoring
No scoring		Third period		John Quenneville (15) - 8:38
No scoring		First overtime period		Reid Duke (8) - 2:59
Landon Bow (32 saves / 35 shots)		Goalie stats		Jordan Papirny (22 saves / 24 shots)

May 11	Seattle Thunderbirds	6 – 1	Brandon Wheat Kings	ShoWare Center	Recap
7:54 - Ryan Gropp (5)		First period	No scoring
7:37 - Alexander True (5); 9:51 - Alexander True (6)		Second period	No scoring
9:22 - Ryan Gropp (6); 12:07 - pp - Donovan Neuls (5); 14:12 - pp - Ethan Bear (8)		Third period	Jayce Hawryluk (3) - pp - 17:46
Landon Bow (30 saves / 31 shots)		Goalie stats	Jordan Papirny (25 saves / 31 shots)

May 13	Seattle Thunderbirds	4 – 8	Brandon Wheat Kings	ShoWare Center	Recap
Josh Uhrich (2) - 8:44		First period	3:15 - John Quenneville (16); 14:18 - pp - Macoy Erkamps (4)
Josh Uhrich (3) - 2:38; Jerret Smith (1) - pp - 3:09; Alexander True (6) - 12:38		Second period	1:33 - Tyler Coulter (6); 18:47 - Jayce Hawryluk (4)
No scoring		Third period	2:55 - Nolan Patrick (13); 6:19 - pp - Jayce Hawryluk (4); 16:41 - en - Jayce Hawryluk (5); 19:40 - en - Stelio Mattheos (4)
Landon Bow (31 saves / 37 shots)		Goalie stats	Jordan Papirny (27 saves / 31 shots)

Brandon won series 4 – 1

== Playoff scoring leaders ==
Note: GP = Games played; G = Goals; A = Assists; Pts = Points; PIM = Penalty minutes

Player	Team	GP	G	A	Pts	PIM
Nolan Patrick	Brandon Wheat Kings	21	13	17	30	16
Jayce Hawryluk	Brandon Wheat Kings	21	7	22	29	39
John Quenneville	Brandon Wheat Kings	21	16	11	27	8
Tim McGauley	Brandon Wheat Kings	21	8	18	26	8
Mathew Barzal	Seattle Thunderbirds	18	5	21	26	16
Reid Duke	Brandon Wheat Kings	21	8	16	24	24
Adam Brooks	Regina Pats	12	7	16	23	6
Ethan Bear	Seattle Thunderbirds	18	8	14	22	8
Adam Helewka	Red Deer Rebels	17	9	9	18	18
Jake DeBrusk	Red Deer Rebels	17	8	9	17	20

== Playoff leading goaltenders ==
Note: GP = Games played; Mins = Minutes played; W = Wins; L = Losses; GA = Goals Allowed; SO = Shutouts; SV% = Save percentage; GAA = Goals against average

Player	Team	GP	Mins	W	L	GA	SO	SV%	GAA
Mario Petit	Everett Silvertips	4	185	3	0	4	1	.953	1.30
Jayden Sittler	Lethbridge Hurricanes	2	102	0	1	3	0	.940	1.76
Landon Bow	Seattle Thunderbirds	18	1131	13	5	37	2	.927	1.96
Connor Ingram	Kamloops Blazers	7	424	3	4	15	1	.938	2.12
Carter Hart	Everett Silvertips	6	352	2	4	14	1	.929	2.39

== WHL awards ==
Ed Chynoweth Cup	WHL Champions	Brandon Wheat Kings	
Scotty Munro Memorial Trophy	Regular season champions	Victoria Royals	
Four Broncos Memorial Trophy	Player of the Year	Dryden Hunt	Moose Jaw Warriors
Bob Clarke Trophy	Top Scorer	Adam Brooks	Regina Pats
Bill Hunter Memorial Trophy	Top Defenceman	Ivan Provorov	Brandon Wheat Kings
Jim Piggott Memorial Trophy	Rookie of the year	Matthew Phillips	Victoria Royals
Del Wilson Trophy	Top Goaltender	Carter Hart	Everett Silvertips
WHL Plus-Minus Award	Top Plus-Minus Rating	Ivan Provorov	Brandon Wheat Kings
Brad Hornung Trophy	Most Sportsmanlike Player	Tyler Soy	Victoria Royals
Daryl K. (Doc) Seaman Trophy	Scholastic Player of the Year	Tanner Kaspick	Brandon Wheat Kings
Jim Donlevy Memorial Trophy	Scholastic team of the Year	Spokane Chiefs	
Dunc McCallum Memorial Trophy	Coach of the Year	Dave Lowry	Victoria Royals
Lloyd Saunders Memorial Trophy	Executive of the Year	Peter Anholt	Lethbridge Hurricanes
Allen Paradice Memorial Trophy	Top Official	Chris Schlenker	
St. Clair Group Trophy	Marketing/Public Relations Award	Victoria Royals	
Doug Wickenheiser Memorial Trophy	Humanitarian of the Year	Tyler Wong	Lethbridge Hurricanes
WHL Playoff MVP	WHL Finals Most Valuable Player	Nolan Patrick	Brandon Wheat Kings
Professional Hockey Achievement; Academic Recipient	Alumni Achievement Awards	Sheldon Kennedy	

=== All-Star teams ===
==== Eastern Conference ====
First Team		Pos.	Second Team	
Player	Team	Pos.	Player	Team
Zach Sawchenko	Moose Jaw Warriors	G	Rylan Parenteau	Prince Albert Raiders
Ivan Provorov*	Brandon Wheat Kings	D	Jake Bean	Calgary Hitmen
Andrew Nielsen	Lethbridge Hurricanes	D	Travis Sanheim	Calgary Hitmen
Dryden Hunt	Moose Jaw Warriors	F	Brayden Burke	Lethbridge Hurricanes
Brayden Point	Moose Jaw Warriors	F	Nolan Patrick	Brandon Wheat Kings
Adam Brooks	Regina Pats	F	Jayce Hawryluk	Brandon Wheat Kings

* - unanimous selection

==== Western Conference ====
First Team		Pos.	Second Team	
Player	Team	Pos.	Player	Team
Carter Hart	Everett Silvertips	G	Connor Ingram	Kamloops Blazers
Joe Hicketts*	Victoria Royals	D	Noah Juulsen	Everett Silvertips
Ethan Bear	Seattle Thunderbirds	D	Jason Fram	Spokane Chiefs
Tyson Baillie	Kelowna Rockets	F	Tyler Soy	Victoria Royals
Mathew Barzal	Seattle Thunderbirds	F	Chase Witala	Prince George Cougars
Parker Bowles	Tri-City Americans	F	Collin Shirley	Kamloops Blazers

* - unanimous selection

== See also ==
- 2016 Memorial Cup
- List of WHL seasons
- 2015–16 OHL season
- 2015–16 QMJHL season
- 2015 in ice hockey
- 2016 in ice hockey

Preceded by 2014–15 WHL season	WHL seasons	Succeeded by 2016–17 WHL season
