= Justin Kirkland =

Canadian ice hockey player (born 1996)

- Born: August 2, 1996 (age 30) Winnipeg, Manitoba, Canada
- Height: 6 ft 3 in (191 cm)
- Weight: 193 lb (88 kg; 13 st 11 lb)
- Position: Centre
- Shoots: Left
- NHL team (P) Cur. team Former teams: Minnesota Wild; Iowa Wild (AHL); Anaheim Ducks; Arizona Coyotes; Calgary Flames
- NHL draft: 62nd overall, 2014; Nashville Predators
- Playing career: 2016–present

Justin Kirkland (born August 2, 1996) is a Canadian professional ice hockey player who is a centre for the Iowa Wild in the American Hockey League (AHL) while under contract to the Minnesota Wild of the National Hockey League (NHL). Kirkland was born in Winnipeg, Manitoba, but grew up in Camrose, Alberta. Kirkland has gained the nickname "Costco", alluding to their Kirkland Signature products.

== Playing career ==
After playing two years of bantam triple-A level hockey for the Camrose Kodiaks U15 AAA team of the Alberta Major Bantam Hockey League, Kirkland was selected by the Kelowna Rockets in the fifth round, 103rd overall, of the 2011 Western Hockey League (WHL) bantam draft. After playing from 2011 to 2013 in Saskatchewan at the Athol Murray College of Notre Dame, Kirkland cracked the Rockets' roster full-time in the 2013–14 season and finished eighth in team scoring with 48 points in 68 games.

Impressed by his WHL rookie season, the Nashville Predators of the National Hockey League (NHL) selected Kirkland in the third round of the 2014 NHL entry draft, 62nd overall. Kirkland scored 51 points in 50 games in the 2014–15 WHL season and helped the Rockets capture the Ed Chynoweth Cup as WHL champions. The Rockets went to the Memorial Cup final that year with Kirkland scoring twice against the Quebec Remparts in the lead up. However, they were defeated by the Oshawa Generals in the final, 2–1, in overtime. Following another successful year in 2015–16 in which he had 67 points in 69 games, Kirkland signed a three-year, entry-level contract with the Predators on May 16, 2016.

Kirkland spent four games with the Predators' then-ECHL affiliate, the Cincinnati Cyclones, in 2016–17; however, he largely played in the American Hockey League (AHL) with the Milwaukee Admirals. He spent the following two seasons exclusively with the Admirals with his best single-season output — nine goals and 30 points — coming in 2018–19, his final year in the Predators' organization. A restricted free agent in the 2019 offseason, Kirkland was not issued a qualifying offer by the Predators and became an unrestricted free agent eligible to sign with any NHL team.

On July 1, 2019, Kirkland signed a one-year, two-way contract with the Calgary Flames, reuniting him with Rockets teammate Dillon Dubé. Kirkland was assigned to the Flames' AHL affiliate, the Stockton Heat, for the 2019–20 season. He had his best offensive season as a professional up to that point, scoring six goals and 28 points in 53 games, and was re-signed by the Flames to another one-year deal on September 28, 2020. He spent the entire 2020–21 season with the Heat. He re-signed with the Flames to another one-year, two-way contract on August 25, 2021. He scored 25 goals and 48 points in 66 games with the Heat in his third season, helping lead the team to the AHL Western Conference Finals.

As a free agent from the Flames, Kirkland signed a one-year, two-way contract with the Anaheim Ducks on July 14, 2022. He began the 2022–23 season with the Ducks' AHL affiliate, the San Diego Gulls, but was recalled on December 20. He made his NHL debut that night in a 4–1 loss to the Los Angeles Kings. He played in seven games with the Ducks. On January 9, while on the way to the Ducks game against in the Boston Bruins in Anaheim, Kirkland was involved in a serious car crash. He was hospitalized overnight and released the next morning. He was placed on injured reserve by the Ducks. Once healthy, he was placed on waivers and after going unclaimed, was returned to the Gulls on February 23. He finished the season with nine goals and 18 points in 32 games with San Diego.

Kirkland signed a one-year, two-way contract with the Arizona Coyotes on July 15, 2023. Kirkland was placed on waivers on October 2 and after going unclaimed, assigned to Arizona's AHL affiliate, the Tucson Roadrunners, to begin the 2023–24 season. Kirkland was recalled and sent down to Tucson in December 2023 before being recalled again on January 6, 2024, and making his debut for the Coyotes on January 7 against the Winnipeg Jets.

As a free agent, following his rights briefly transferring from the defunct Coyotes to the Utah Hockey Club, Kirkland opted to return to the Calgary Flames in agreeing to a one-year, two-way contract on July 3, 2024. Kirkland scored his first NHL goal on Stuart Skinner of the Edmonton Oilers in a 4–1 win on October 13, 2024. On November 29, Kirkland suffered a knee injury during a game versus the Columbus Blue Jackets, requiring ACL surgery and ending his 2024–25 season. In 21 games with Calgary before his injury, Kirkland had two goals and six assists.

On July 1, 2026, Kirkland signed a one-year, two-way contract worth $850,000 with the Minnesota Wild for the 2026–27 season.

== Career statistics ==
			Regular season					Playoffs
Season	Team	League	GP	G	A	Pts	PIM	GP	G	A	Pts	PIM
2012–13	Kelowna Rockets	WHL	6	2	0	2	2	6	0	1	1	0
2013–14	Kelowna Rockets	WHL	68	17	31	48	40	14	5	5	10	20
2014–15	Kelowna Rockets	WHL	50	21	30	51	25	9	3	2	5	0
2015–16	Kelowna Rockets	WHL	69	31	36	67	69	18	11	4	15	15
2016–17	Milwaukee Admirals	AHL	56	9	12	21	34	3	0	2	2	4
2016–17	Cincinnati Cyclones	ECHL	4	1	1	2	2	—	—	—	—	—
2017–18	Milwaukee Admirals	AHL	67	7	11	18	19	—	—	—	—	—
2018–19	Milwaukee Admirals	AHL	75	9	21	30	58	5	1	3	4	8
2019–20	Stockton Heat	AHL	53	6	22	28	44	—	—	—	—	—
2020–21	Stockton Heat	AHL	16	2	5	7	16	—	—	—	—	—
2021–22	Stockton Heat	AHL	66	25	23	48	75	13	7	5	12	14
2022–23	San Diego Gulls	AHL	32	9	9	18	16	—	—	—	—	—
2022–23	Anaheim Ducks	NHL	7	0	0	0	0	—	—	—	—	—
2023–24	Tucson Roadrunners	AHL	43	8	22	30	25	2	1	0	1	2
2023–24	Arizona Coyotes	NHL	2	0	0	0	0	—	—	—	—	—
2024–25	Calgary Flames	NHL	21	2	6	8	11	—	—	—	—	—
2025–26	Calgary Flames	NHL	20	1	1	2	2	—	—	—	—	—
2025–26	Calgary Wranglers	AHL	42	11	11	22	32	—	—	—	—	—
NHL totals			50	3	7	10	13	—	—	—	—	—

== Awards and honours ==
Award	Year	Ref
WHL
Ed Chynoweth Cup	2015	
