= Adam Helewka =

Canadian ice hockey player (born 1995)

- Helewka in 2026
- Born: July 21, 1995 (age 31) Burnaby, British Columbia, Canada
- Height: 6 ft 2 in (188 cm)
- Weight: 205 lb (93 kg; 14 st 9 lb)
- Position: Left wing
- Shoots: Left
- ICEHL team Former teams: Dresdner Eislöwen; HC Bolzano; San Jose Barracuda; Tucson Roadrunners; Milwaukee Admirals; Barys Nur-Sultan; Linköping HC; HKM Zvolen; Cleveland Monsters; HC TWK Innsbruck; SaiPa; HC Oceláři Třinec
- NHL draft: 106th overall, 2015; San Jose Sharks
- Playing career: 2016–present

Adam Helewka (born July 21, 1995) is a Canadian professional ice hockey left winger. He is currently playing with the Dresdner Eislöwen in the German Ice Hockey League 2 (DEL2).

== Early life ==
Helewka was born on July 21, 1995, in Burnaby, British Columbia, Canada, to parents Alison and Dave. His mother, a teacher, was born and raised in Wales while his father played rugby in Saskatchewan.

== Playing career ==
Growing up in Burnaby, Helewka played with the Burnaby Winter Club of the Burnaby Minor Hockey League and Vancouver Northwest Giants, of the BC Hockey Major Midget League. After originally being cut from his tier-one team during his second year of bantams, and failing to join the Giants, he enrolled at the Athol Murray College of Notre Dame and played Double-A midget hockey. He played two seasons with Notre Dame before joining the Giants for one season in 2011–12.

Following his single season with the Giants, Helewka joined the Spokane Chiefs of the Western Hockey League (WHL) for their 2012–13 season. During his rookie season with the team, Helewka led Chief rookies with 10 goals and 17 assists in 60 games to win the teams Rookie of the Year award.

Although he was eligible for the 2013 and 2014 NHL entry drafts, Helewka went undrafted and remained eligible for the 2015 draft. During the 2014–15 season, Helewka increased his production output and recorded 44 goals and 43 assists for 87 points in 69 games. As a result, he was drafted 106th overall by the San Jose Sharks that summer. On December 16, 2015, Helewka was suspended for six games as a result of an after a post-horn fight with Parker Wotherspoon of the Tri City Americans. The six-game suspension was the longest in the WHL that season and carried a $1,000 fine for the team. Following the suspension, Helewka was traded to the Red Deer Rebels in exchange for Wyatt Johnson, Eli Zummack, a 2nd round selection in the 2016 Western Hockey League Bantam Draft and a 5th round pick in the 2017 WHL Bantam Draft. He concluded his major junior ice hockey career on March 3, 2016, by signing a three-year entry-level contract with the Sharks.

=== Professional ===
Upon completing his major junior career, Helewka joined the Sharks' American Hockey League (AHL) affiliate, the San Jose Barracuda, for the 2016–17 season. In his first full season with the team, Helewka scored 14 goals and 15 assists in 58 games. On June 15, 2018, the Sharks traded Helewka to the Arizona Coyotes in exchange for Kyle Wood. At the time of the trade, he had recorded 23 goals and 44 assists for 67 points through 121 career games. He immediately joined the Coyotes AHL affiliate, the Tucson Roadrunners, for 2018–19 before being traded to the Nashville Predators mid-way through the season. Despite the trade, Helewka continued setting new career highs in points with 38 and goals with 16 through 48 combined games with the Milwaukee Admirals and the Roadrunners. As a result, he was signed to a one-year contract to remain with the Predators organization on February 27, 2019.

Helewka's stint with the Predators organization was short-lived, however, as he was acquired by the New Jersey Devils on June 22, 2019, in exchange for future considerations. However, prior to the start of the 2019–20 season, Helewka left North America to join the Barys Nur-Sultan of the Kontinental Hockey League (KHL). He played eight games with the Nur-Sultan before joining the Linköping HC of the Swedish Hockey League. During the COVID-19 pandemic, Helewka was loaned to the HKM Zvolen of the Tipos extraliga.

On April 24, 2020, Helewka returned to North America and signed an AHL contract with the Cleveland Monsters, the Columbus Blue Jackets AHL affiliate.

Following two seasons with the Cleveland Monsters, Helewka left the AHL and returned abroad in agreeing to a one-year contract with Austrian club, HC Innsbruck of the ICEHL, on June 22, 2022.

In 2026 Helewka signed a one-year contract with the German DEL2-Club Dresdner Eislöwen.

== Career statistics ==
			Regular season					Playoffs
Season	Team	League	GP	G	A	Pts	PIM	GP	G	A	Pts	PIM
2012–13	Spokane Chiefs	WHL	60	10	17	27	12	9	1	2	3	2
2013–14	Spokane Chiefs	WHL	62	23	27	50	32	4	0	0	0	4
2014–15	Spokane Chiefs	WHL	69	44	43	87	59	6	3	2	5	12
2015–16	San Jose Barracuda	AHL	3	0	1	1	0	—	—	—	—	—
2015–16	Spokane Chiefs	WHL	19	16	13	29	23	—	—	—	—	—
2015–16	Red Deer Rebels	WHL	34	26	19	45	34	17	9	9	18	18
2016–17	San Jose Barracuda	AHL	58	14	15	29	28	12	3	0	3	6
2016–17	Allen Americans	ECHL	2	0	0	0	0	—	—	—	—	—
2017–18	San Jose Barracuda	AHL	63	9	29	38	29	4	1	2	3	0
2018–19	Tucson Roadrunners	AHL	41	13	18	31	20	—	—	—	—	—
2018–19	Milwaukee Admirals	AHL	24	8	11	19	2	5	0	0	0	2
2019–20	Barys Nur-Sultan	KHL	8	1	2	3	2	—	—	—	—	—
2019–20	Linköping HC	SHL	38	6	10	16	16	—	—	—	—	—
2020–21	HKM Zvolen	Slovak	17	3	6	9	10	—	—	—	—	—
2020–21	Cleveland Monsters	AHL	25	3	9	12	4	—	—	—	—	—
2021–22	Cleveland Monsters	AHL	37	6	11	17	12	—	—	—	—	—
2022–23	HC TWK Innsbruck	ICEHL	43	28	39	67	45	6	0	5	5	4
2023–24	SaiPa	Liiga	34	7	9	16	59	—	—	—	—	—
2023–24	HC Oceláři Třinec	ELH	5	2	2	4	0	19	3	3	6	9
AHL totals			251	53	94	147	95	21	4	2	6	8
KHL totals			8	1	2	3	2	—	—	—	—	—
SHL totals			38	6	10	16	16	—	—	—	—	—

== Awards and honours ==
Award	Year
WHL
West Second All-Star Team	2015
