= Daryl K. (Doc) Seaman Trophy =

The Daryl K. (Doc) Seaman Trophy is presented annually to the top scholastic player in the Western Hockey League. It is named for Daryl K. (Doc) Seaman, a native of Calgary who worked for years to promote the cause of higher education in junior hockey.

== Winners ==
| Season | Player | Team |
| 1983–84 | Ken Baumgartner | Prince Albert Raiders |
| 1984–85 | Mark Janssens | Regina Pats |
| 1985–86 | Mark Janssens | Regina Pats |
| 1986–87 | Casey McMillan | Lethbridge Hurricanes |
| 1987–88 | Kevin Cheveldayoff | Brandon Wheat Kings |
| 1988–89 | Jeff Nelson | Prince Albert Raiders |
| 1989–90 | Jeff Nelson | Prince Albert Raiders |
| 1990–91 | Scott Niedermayer | Kamloops Blazers |
| 1991–92 | Ashley Buckberger | Swift Current Broncos |
| 1992–93 | David Trofimenkoff | Lethbridge Hurricanes |
| 1993–94 | Byron Penstock | Brandon Wheat Kings |
| 1994–95 | Perry Johnson | Regina Pats |
| 1995–96 | Bryce Salvador | Lethbridge Hurricanes |
| 1996–97 | Stefan Cherneski | Brandon Wheat Kings |
| 1997–98 | Kyle Rossiter | Spokane Chiefs |
| 1998–99 | Chris Nielsen | Calgary Hitmen |
| 1999–2000 | Chris Nielsen | Calgary Hitmen |
| 2000–01 | Dan Hulak | Portland Winter Hawks |
| 2001–02 | Tyler Metcalfe | Seattle Thunderbirds |
| 2002–03 | Brett Dickie | Brandon Wheat Kings |
| 2003–04 | Devan Dubnyk | Kamloops Blazers |
| 2004–05 | Gilbert Brule | Vancouver Giants |
| 2005–06 | Brennen Wray | Moose Jaw Warriors |
| 2006–07 | Keith Aulie | Brandon Wheat Kings |
| 2007–08 | Jordan Eberle | Regina Pats |
| 2008–09 | Stefan Elliott | Saskatoon Blades |
| 2009–10 | Adam Lowry | Swift Current Broncos |
| 2010–11 | Colin Smith | Kamloops Blazers |
| 2011–12 | Reid Gow | Spokane Chiefs |
| 2012–13 | Josh Morrissey | Prince Albert Raiders |
| 2013–14 | Nelson Nogier | Saskatoon Blades |
| 2014–15 | Nick McBride | Prince Albert Raiders |
| 2015–16 | Tanner Kaspick | Brandon Wheat Kings |
| 2016–17 | Brian King | Everett Silvertips |
| 2017–18 | Ty Smith | Spokane Chiefs |
| 2018–19 | Dustin Wolf | Everett Silvertips |
| 2019–20 | Dylan Garand | Kamloops Blazers |
| 2020–21 | Ethan Peters | Edmonton Oil Kings |
| 2021–22 | Connor Levis | Kamloops Blazers |
| 2022–23 | Quinn Mantei | Brandon Wheat Kings |
| 2023–24 | Noah Chadwick | Lethbridge Hurricanes |
| 2024–25 | Max Curran | Tri-City Americans |
| 2025–26 | Alex Weiermaier | Portland Winterhawks |

- Blue background denotes also named CHL Scholastic Player of the Year

== See also ==
- CHL Scholastic Player of the Year
- Bobby Smith Trophy - Ontario Hockey League Scholastic Player of the Year
- Marcel Robert Trophy - Quebec Major Junior Hockey League Scholastic Player of the Year
