= Kale Clague =

Canadian ice hockey player (born 1998)

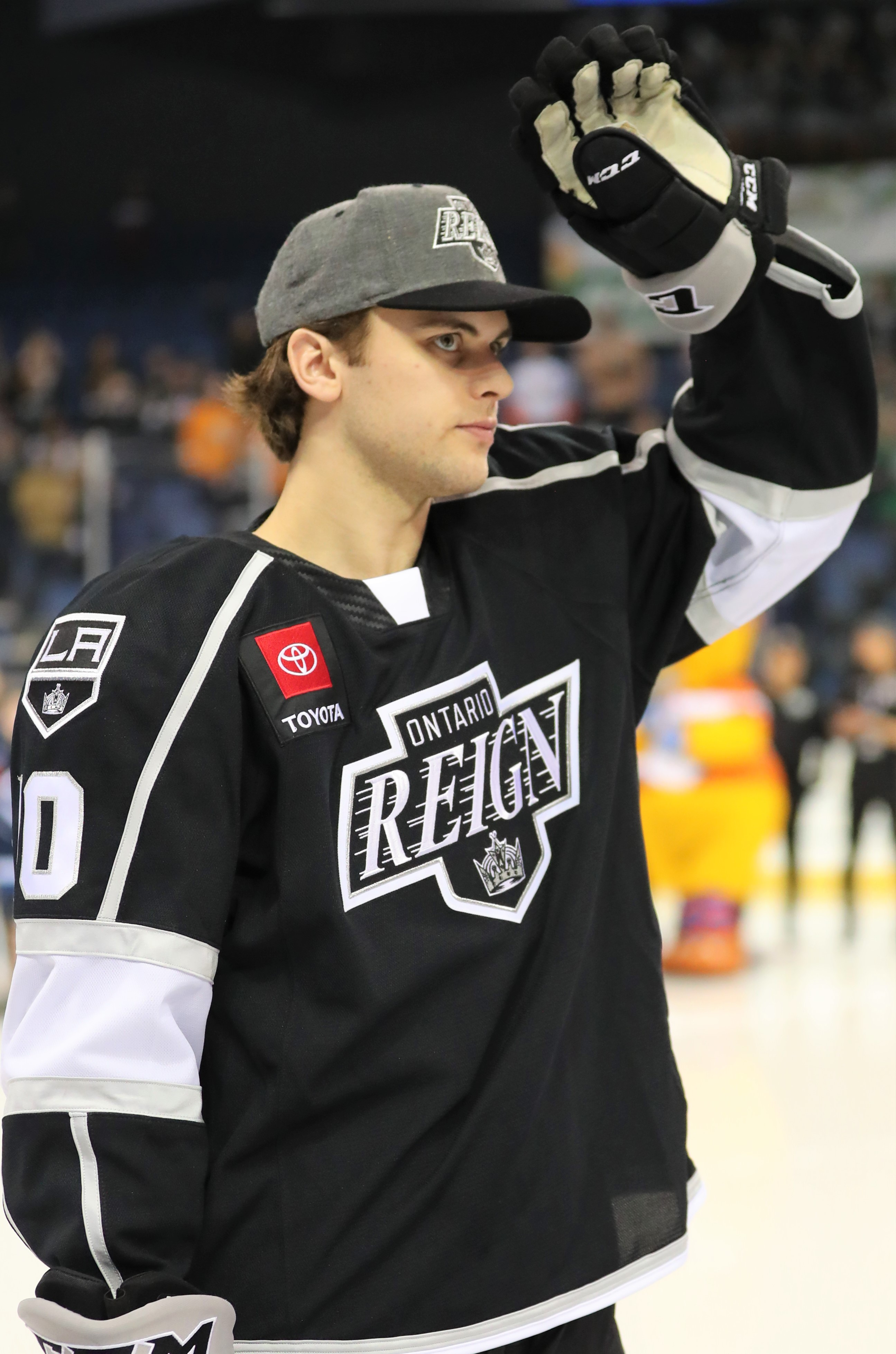
- Clague with the Ontario Reign in 2020
- Born: June 5, 1998 (age 28) Regina, Saskatchewan, Canada
- Height: 6 ft 0 in (183 cm)
- Weight: 190 lb (86 kg; 13 st 8 lb)
- Position: Defence
- Shoots: Left
- KHL team Former teams: Avtomobilist Yekaterinburg; Los Angeles Kings; Montreal Canadiens; Buffalo Sabres
- NHL draft: 51st overall, 2016; Los Angeles Kings
- Playing career: 2018–present

Kale Clague (born June 5, 1998) is a Canadian professional ice hockey defenceman for Avtomobilist Yekaterinburg of the Kontinental Hockey League (KHL). He was selected in the second round, 51st overall, by the Los Angeles Kings in the 2016 NHL entry draft. Clague has also previously played for the Montreal Canadiens and Buffalo Sabres.

== Early life ==
Clague was born on June 5, 1998, in Regina, Saskatchewan, Canada to parents Jason and Juanita. His father was a goaltender for the 2000–01 Lloydminster Border Kings which was inducted into the Saskatchewan Hockey Hall of Fame. His uncle Trevor Hanas is also involved in ice hockey; he played five seasons in the Western Hockey League (WHL) before a brief minor professional career. Growing up, he attended Holy Rosary High School and won the Brick Invitational Hockey Tournament.

== Playing career ==
Growing up in Alberta, Clague played both ice hockey and baseball. He helped the Lloydminster Twins Peewee AA team win the Western Canadian Baseball Championship in 2010 and won the Alberta Peewee Provincial Championship. During his bantam career, Clague established a new scoring record for defencemen in the provinces bantam AAA ranks with 35 goals and 77 points in 33 games. His scoring record surpassed former Toronto Maple Leafs captain Dion Phaneuf who had 65 points. He was subsequently named to the AMHL First All-Star Team in 2013–14 and captained Alberta to a gold medal at the 2013 Western Canada U16 Challenge Cup. During this time, Clague was drafted sixth overall of the Brandon Wheat Kings in the 2013 Western Hockey League bantam draft.

=== Major junior ===
Clague competed in four pre-season games with the Wheat Kings during their 2013–14 season, where he recorded two goals and five points, before being returned to the Alberta Midget Hockey League. He eventually rejoined the WHL to compete with the Wheat Kings in the 2014 WHL Playoffs. At the age of 16, Clague made his rookie season debut with the Wheat Kings but a series of injuries limited him to 20 games. When reflecting on the year, Clague said "It was hard to overcome those injuries and it sucked to sit out all those games. But I worked hard with our trainer in Brandon and got healthy again and ready for the 2015–16 WHL season."

Following his disappointing rookie season, Clague increased his offensive output and recorded 43 points in 71 regular-season games and played in the 2016 CHL/NHL Top Prospects Game. By the conclusion of the playoffs, he tied for second among WHL defensemen in scoring with 14 points in 21 games. As a result, Clague was drafted in the second round, 51st overall, by the Los Angeles Kings in the 2016 NHL entry draft. He joined the Kings for their 2016 development camp but suffered a leg injury and was forced to leave early. The injury came when an Arizona Coyotes prospect hit him and he fell awkwardly into the end boards. Upon returning to the WHL, Clague was named one of the Wheat Kings alternate captains for the 2016–17 season.

Clague began his final full season with the Wheat Kings by earning WHL Player of the Week for the week ending October 23, 2016. The honour came after he registered six points in his first two games of the season following his leg injury. As a result of his play during the remainder of the season, Clague signed a three-year entry-level contract with the Kings on March 6, 2017. At the time of the signing, he led team defenseman in points and assists and ranked second in goals with five. Following this, he was also named an WHL Eastern Conference First Team All-Star.

During the 2017 offseason, Clague was again invited to participate in the Los Angeles Kings' rookie and training camp. While with the Kings, he participated in two preseason games against the Anaheim Ducks and Vegas Golden Knights. By January, Clague had recorded 47 points in 28 games tying defenceman David Quenneville for the league scoring lead among defenceman. On January 17, leading up to the 2018 WHL Trade Deadline, Clague was traded to the Moose Jaw Warriors in exchange for Luka Burzan, Chase Hartje, a second-round pick in the 2018 WHL bantam draft, and first-round picks in the 2019 and 2021 drafts.

=== Professional ===
Clague made his NHL debut with the Los Angeles Kings on December 21, 2019, against the Buffalo Sabres. From there, he appeared in three more games during his first NHL call-up where he averaged 14:34 time on ice per game. Upon returning to the AHL, Clague was named to the 2020 AHL All-Star Game for the first time. At the time of his selection, he led team defensemen in points with 16 in 33 games.

When the NHL resumed playing for the 2020–21 season, Clague was named to the Kings' opening night roster. On August 6, 2021, Clague signed a one-year extension with the Kings worth an annual value of $761,250 at the NHL level.

In the following 2021–22 season, Clague was assigned by Los Angeles to begin the year in the AHL with the Ontario Reign. On dual recalls to the Kings, Clague registered 5 assists through 11 games before he was placed on waivers and claimed by the Montreal Canadiens on December 4, 2021.

As a free agent from the Canadiens, Clague was signed by the Buffalo Sabres on a one-year, two-way contract on July 13, 2022.

After three seasons within the Sabres organization, Clague left as a free agent and was signed to a one-year, two-way contract with the Winnipeg Jets for the 2025–26 season on July 1, 2025.

Having concluded his contract with the Jets, Clague agreed to his first contract abroad in signing a two-year contract with Russian club, Avtomobilist Yekaterinburg of the KHL, on June 9, 2026.

== International play ==
Medal record

Ice hockey

Representing Canada

World Junior Championships
Gold medal – first place	2018 United States	
Silver medal – second place	2017 Canada	

Clague competed in the 2014 World Under-17 Hockey Challenge for Team Black, recording one goal in four games. He later won gold with Canada at the 2015 Ivan Hlinka Memorial Tournament, where he scored one goal in four games. Clague returned to Team Canada in 2017 as an assistant captain to help them win a silver medal at the 2017 World Junior Ice Hockey Championships.

In his final year qualifying for the World Junior Ice Hockey Championships, Clague was again selected to compete with Canada where he won a gold medal. Hockey Canada launched into high-profile allegations of group sexual assault in 2018 involving World Junior players including Kale Clague.

== Player profile ==
“Clague is possibly the most purely talented defenceman I have seen come down the pipe in the last few years,...He has soft hands and a powerful stride which he uses to dynamically transition the puck and create offence for his team. He has a big, booming shot, poise and an electric skillset which makes him difficult to contain when he has space, and he’s a threat to create offence at all times.”

— Scout Zenon Herasymiuk prior the 2016 NHL entry draft.

Prior to becoming a professional ice hockey player, Clague described himself as "an offensive defenseman who sees the ice well and someone who works hard at defending in my own end." Leading up to the 2016 NHL entry draft, scout John Williams described him as "an excellent skater" who "has excellent vision when moving the puck, makes a solid first pass out of the zone and is a composed player who makes good choices under pressure." Clague has compared his playing style to that of Drew Doughty.

== Career statistics ==
=== Regular season and playoffs ===
			Regular season					Playoffs
Season	Team	League	GP	G	A	Pts	PIM	GP	G	A	Pts	PIM
2012–13	Lloydminster Bobcats	AMHL	1	0	1	1	0	1	0	0	0	0
2013–14	Lloydminster Bobcats	AMHL	31	11	22	33	34	12	2	11	13	2
2013–14	Brandon Wheat Kings	WHL	2	0	0	0	0	3	0	0	0	2
2014–15	Brandon Wheat Kings	WHL	20	4	9	13	6	12	1	2	3	4
2015–16	Brandon Wheat Kings	WHL	71	6	37	43	54	21	6	8	14	8
2016–17	Brandon Wheat Kings	WHL	48	5	35	40	41	4	1	3	4	6
2017–18	Brandon Wheat Kings	WHL	28	10	37	47	35	—	—	—	—	—
2017–18	Moose Jaw Warriors	WHL	26	1	23	24	8	14	1	13	14	14
2018–19	Ontario Reign	AHL	52	7	22	29	34	—	—	—	—	—
2019–20	Ontario Reign	AHL	49	8	17	25	26	—	—	—	—	—
2019–20	Los Angeles Kings	NHL	4	0	0	0	2	—	—	—	—	—
2020–21	Ontario Reign	AHL	23	1	11	12	8	1	0	1	1	0
2020–21	Los Angeles Kings	NHL	18	0	6	6	4	—	—	—	—	—
2021–22	Ontario Reign	AHL	5	0	4	4	0	—	—	—	—	—
2021–22	Los Angeles Kings	NHL	11	0	5	5	2	—	—	—	—	—
2021–22	Montreal Canadiens	NHL	25	2	3	5	18	—	—	—	—	—
2022–23	Rochester Americans	AHL	14	1	5	6	6	—	—	—	—	—
2022–23	Buffalo Sabres	NHL	33	0	4	4	24	—	—	—	—	—
2023–24	Rochester Americans	AHL	42	3	20	23	52	—	—	—	—	—
2023–24	Buffalo Sabres	NHL	3	0	1	1	2	—	—	—	—	—
2024–25	Rochester Americans	AHL	69	10	29	39	32	8	5	6	11	10
2025–26	Manitoba Moose	AHL	67	9	18	27	38	6	0	2	2	0
NHL totals			94	2	19	21	52	—	—	—	—	—

=== International ===
Year	Team	Event	Result	GP	G	A	Pts	PIM
2014	Canada Black	U17	7th	4	1	0	1	0
2015	Canada	IH18	1st place, gold medalist(s)	4	1	0	1	2
2017	Canada	WJC	2nd place, silver medalist(s)	7	0	6	6	2
2018	Canada	WJC	1st place, gold medalist(s)	6	0	2	2	4
Junior totals				21	2	8	10	8
