= Brandon Baddock =

Canadian ice hockey player (born 1995)

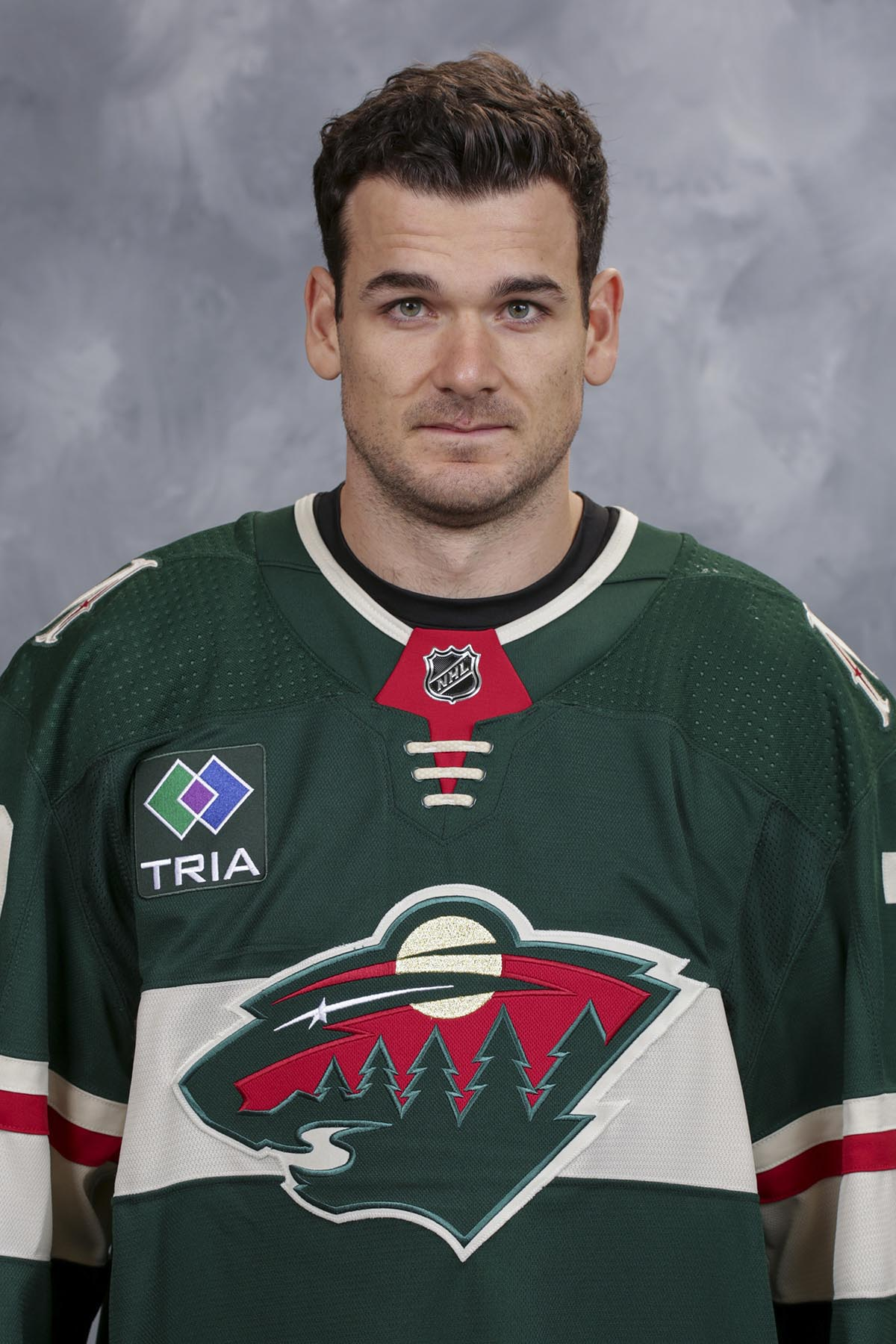
- Baddock with the Minnesota Wild
- Born: March 29, 1995 (age 31) Vermilion, Alberta, Canada
- Height: 6 ft 3 in (191 cm)
- Weight: 218 lb (99 kg; 15 st 8 lb)
- Position: Left wing
- Shoots: Left
- team Former teams: Free agent Montreal Canadiens
- NHL draft: 161st overall, 2014; New Jersey Devils
- Playing career: 2016–present

Brandon Baddock (born March 29, 1995) is a Canadian professional ice hockey winger who is currently an unrestricted free agent. He most recently played for the Toronto Marlies of the American Hockey League (AHL). He was selected in the sixth round, 161st overall, by the New Jersey Devils of the National Hockey League (NHL) in the 2014 NHL entry draft and has previously played for the Montreal Canadiens.

== Playing career ==
=== Junior ===
After playing minor hockey in the Alberta Major Bantam Hockey League (AMBHL), Baddock was drafted 134th overall by the Edmonton Oil Kings in the seventh round of the 2010 WHL Bantam Draft. He played two more seasons in the Alberta Minor Midget Hockey League (AMMHL) and in the Alberta Junior Hockey League (AJHL) before making his Western Hockey League (WHL) debut.

Baddock made his WHL debut on November 19, 2011, in a 5–2 loss against the Lethbridge Hurricanes. In his second WHL appearance on September 20, 2012, he scored his first WHL goal in a 5–3 win against the Kootenay Ice. Overall, he played 59 games with seven goals and four assists in his rookie WHL season, en route to a WHL Championship final appearance. In the 2013–14 WHL season, he played 56 games with six goals and 11 assists, en route to the Oil Kings' fourth Ed Chynoweth Cup and first Memorial Cup. Prior to the 2014–15 WHL season, Baddock was named alternate captain of the Oil Kings, scoring 19 goals and 21 assists in 71 games played. In his final WHL season, he was selected as captain, scoring 22 goals and 13 assists in 68 games played.

=== Professional ===
After being drafted 161st overall by the New Jersey Devils in the sixth round of the 2014 NHL entry draft, Baddock signed a three-year entry-level contract with the Devils on June 1, 2016.

On January 29, 2017, the Devils' American Hockey League (AHL) affiliate, the Albany Devils, reassigned him to their ECHL affiliate, the Adirondack Thunder. The same day, he made his professional debut for the Thunder, in a 3–2 win against the Elmira Jackals. He ultimately appeared in 21 games with four assists in his rookie professional season for the Thunder. On October 7, 2017, he made his AHL debut for the Binghamton Devils in a 2–1 win against the Bridgeport Sound Tigers. On October 28, 2017, he scored his first professional goal in a 2–1 win against the Springfield Thunderbirds, playing 53 games with three goals and four assists in the 2017–18 AHL season. The following season, he played 67 games with three goals, seven assists and was the 2018–19 AHL season penalty infraction minute leader.

On July 15, 2019, the New Jersey Devils re-signed Baddock to a one-year, two-way contract. He played 50 games with six goals and nine assists in the shortened AHL season.

On October 9, 2020, the Montreal Canadiens signed Baddock to a one-year two-way contract. He was promoted to the Canadiens' taxi squad in the 2020–21 season, however never appeared in an National Hockey League (NHL) game. He also appeared in 25 games with two goals and three assists for the Canadiens' AHL affiliate, Laval Rocket, in the 2020–21 AHL season.

On July 27, 2021, the Canadiens re-signed Baddock to a one-year, two-way contract. After injuries and a COVID-19 outbreak on the Canadiens' roster, he made his NHL debut on December 30, 2021, in a 4–0 loss against the Carolina Hurricanes. He was placed on the COVID-19 protocol the following day.

On February 12, 2022, Baddock was traded by the Canadiens to the Minnesota Wild in exchange for Andrew Hammond.

Following the conclusion of his contract with the Wild, Baddock was released as a free agent. Prior to the commencement of the 2023–24 season, Baddock was signed to a one-year AHL contract with the Rockford Icehogs, the primary affiliate of the Chicago Blackhawks, on October 10, 2023.

During the 2024–25 season, his second with the IceHogs, Baddock registered 7 points through 38 regular season games before he was traded to the Toronto Marlies for future considerations on March 14, 2025. On August 4, 2025, Baddock agreed to a one-year AHL contract extension with the Marlies for the 2025–26 season.

== Career statistics ==
			Regular season					Playoffs
Season	Team	League	GP	G	A	Pts	PIM	GP	G	A	Pts	PIM
2011–12	Lloydminster Bobcats	AJHL	41	2	1	3	91	1	0	0	0	0
2011–12	Edmonton Oil Kings	WHL	1	0	0	0	0	—	—	—	—	—
2012–13	Edmonton Oil Kings	WHL	59	7	4	11	73	22	0	1	1	12
2013–14	Edmonton Oil Kings	WHL	56	6	11	17	128	13	1	0	1	6
2014–15	Edmonton Oil Kings	WHL	71	19	21	40	136	5	1	0	1	10
2015–16	Edmonton Oil Kings	WHL	68	22	13	35	143	5	1	0	1	10
2016–17	Adirondack Thunder	ECHL	21	0	4	4	15	4	0	1	1	2
2017–18	Binghamton Devils	AHL	53	3	4	7	109	—	—	—	—	—
2018–19	Binghamton Devils	AHL	67	3	7	10	154	—	—	—	—	—
2019–20	Binghamton Devils	AHL	50	6	9	15	114	—	—	—	—	—
2020–21	Laval Rocket	AHL	25	2	3	5	64	—	—	—	—	—
2021–22	Laval Rocket	AHL	33	3	4	7	77	—	—	—	—	—
2021–22	Montreal Canadiens	NHL	1	0	0	0	0	—	—	—	—	—
2021–22	Iowa Wild	AHL	28	0	1	1	54	—	—	—	—	—
2022–23	Iowa Wild	AHL	67	4	3	7	130	—	—	—	—	—
2023–24	Rockford IceHogs	AHL	63	0	3	3	111	4	0	0	0	0
2024–25	Rockford IceHogs	AHL	38	3	4	7	86	—	—	—	—	—
2024–25	Toronto Marlies	AHL	7	1	0	1	11	—	—	—	—	—
2025–26	Toronto Marlies	AHL	20	1	3	4	50	—	—	—	—	—
NHL totals			1	0	0	0	0	—	—	—	—	—

== Awards and honours ==
Award	Year
AHL
Calder Cup champion	2026
