= Nelson Nogier =

Canadian ice hockey player (born 1996)

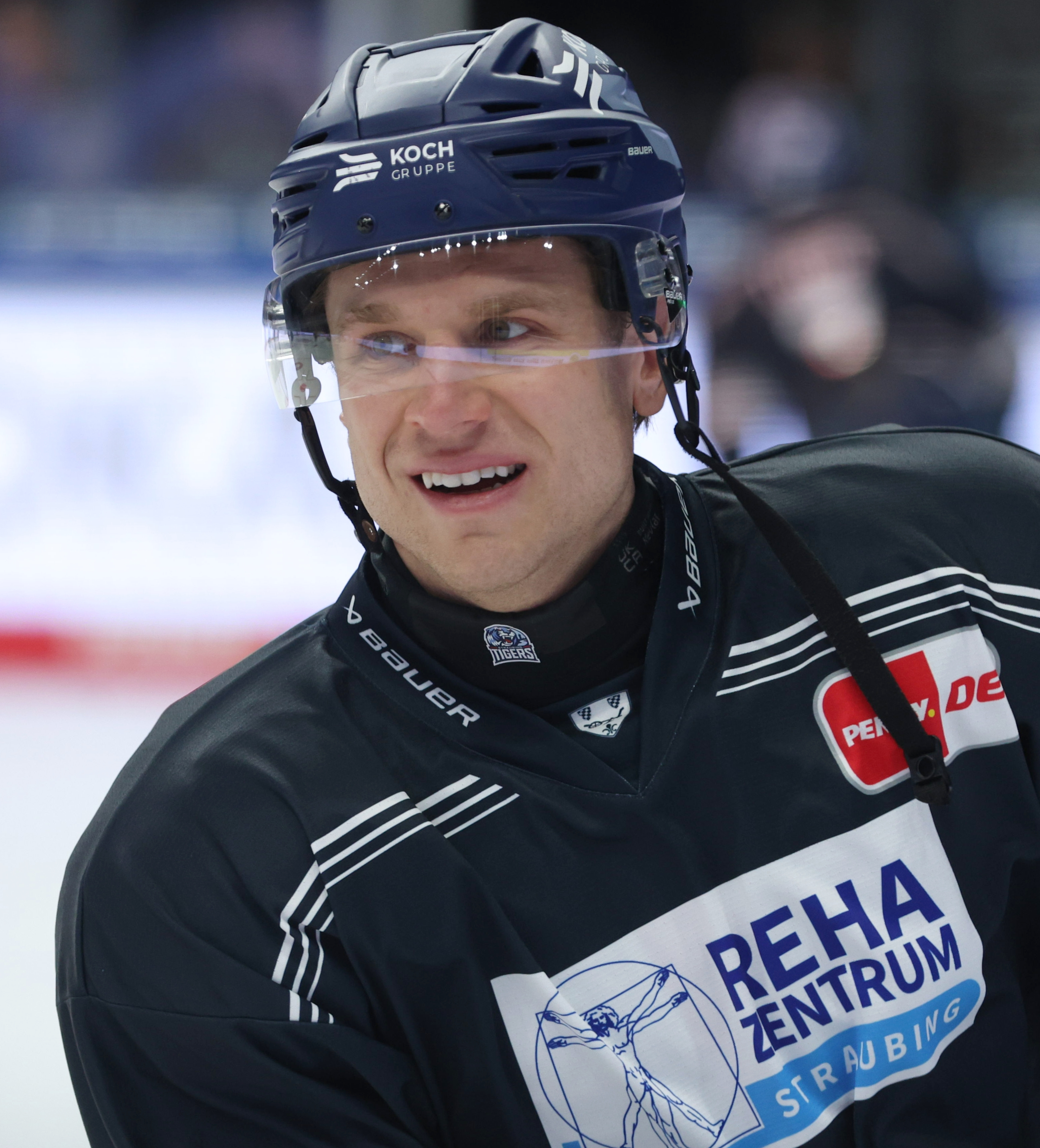
- Nogier in 2025
- Born: May 27, 1996 (age 30) Saskatoon, Saskatchewan, Canada
- Height: 6 ft 2 in (188 cm)
- Weight: 191 lb (87 kg; 13 st 9 lb)
- Position: Defence
- Shoots: Right
- DEL team Former teams: Straubing Tigers; Winnipeg Jets; Barys Astana
- NHL draft: 101st overall, 2014; Winnipeg Jets
- Playing career: 2016–present

Nelson Nogier (born May 27, 1996) is a Canadian professional ice hockey defenceman who currently plays for the Straubing Tigers of the German Ice Hockey League (DEL). He previously played in the National Hockey League (NHL) with the Winnipeg Jets and in the Kontinental Hockey League (KHL) with Barys Astana.

== Playing career ==
Nogier played junior hockey for the Western Hockey League's Saskatoon Blades from 2011 until December 14, 2014, when he was traded to the Red Deer Rebels. In his final year of junior hockey, Nogier attained career highs in goals (4), assists (17), points (21), and plus-minus (+27). Nogier was the recipient of the 2013–14 Daryl K. (Doc) Seaman Trophy for the WHL's Scholastic Player of The Year.

The Winnipeg Jets selected Nogier in the fourth round (101st) of the 2014 NHL entry draft. After completing his junior career with the 2016 Memorial Cup host Red Deer Rebels, Nogier signed a three-year, two-way entry-level contract with the Jets.

Nogier attended the Winnipeg Jets 2016 preseason training camp, his second with the team, but was subsequently demoted to the Jets farm team, the Manitoba Moose, with the first round of cuts. Nogier spent most of his professional rookie season with the Moose in the American Hockey League. He was recalled by the Jets late in the season and made his NHL debut on March 21, 2017, playing a total of 10 games.

During the 2021–22 season, Nogier's six year tenure within the Jets organization ended when he was dealt at the NHL trade deadline to the Los Angeles Kings in exchange for Markus Phillips on March 21, 2022.

As a free agent from the Kings in the off-season, Nogier opted to pursue a career abroad, in agreeing to a one-year contract with Kazakh-based KHL club, Barys Nur-Sultan on September 13, 2022. In the following 2022–23 season, Nogier made 49 regular season appearances for Astana, registering 8 points from the blueline.

On September 9, 2024, Nogier signed a one-year contract with the Straubing Tigers of the German Ice Hockey League (DEL).

== Personal ==
Nogier grew up in Clavet, Saskatchewan. His father, Pat, is a police officer with the Saskatoon Police Service and a former junior hockey player, who survived the deadly Swift Current Broncos bus crash in 1986.

== Career statistics ==
=== Regular season and playoffs ===
			Regular season					Playoffs
Season	Team	League	GP	G	A	Pts	PIM	GP	G	A	Pts	PIM
2011–12	Saskatoon Contacts	SMHL	43	3	10	13	42	13	0	3	3	4
2011–12	Saskatoon Blades	WHL	4	0	0	0	0	—	—	—	—	—
2012–13	Saskatoon Blades	WHL	55	0	4	4	8	3	0	1	1	0
2013–14	Saskatoon Blades	WHL	37	1	5	6	25	—	—	—	—	—
2014–15	Saskatoon Blades	WHL	32	1	7	8	42	—	—	—	—	—
2014–15	Red Deer Rebels	WHL	38	2	9	11	42	5	0	1	1	4
2015–16	Red Deer Rebels	WHL	69	4	17	21	79	17	2	2	4	18
2016–17	Manitoba Moose	AHL	60	2	11	13	35	—	—	—	—	—
2016–17	Winnipeg Jets	NHL	10	0	0	0	5	—	—	—	—	—
2017–18	Manitoba Moose	AHL	13	0	1	1	4	2	0	0	0	2
2018–19	Manitoba Moose	AHL	74	1	8	9	48	—	—	—	—	—
2018–19	Winnipeg Jets	NHL	1	0	0	0	0	—	—	—	—	—
2019–20	Manitoba Moose	AHL	58	1	8	9	45	—	—	—	—	—
2020–21	Manitoba Moose	AHL	12	1	2	3	12	—	—	—	—	—
2021–22	Manitoba Moose	AHL	25	3	3	6	8	—	—	—	—	—
2021–22	Ontario Reign	AHL	13	1	3	4	8	5	1	2	3	2
2022–23	Barys Astana	KHL	49	1	7	8	36	—	—	—	—	—
2023–24	Barys Astana	KHL	68	6	6	12	26	—	—	—	—	—
2024–25	Straubing Tigers	DEL	48	5	9	14	51	7	0	0	0	8
NHL totals			11	0	0	0	5	—	—	—	—	—
KHL totals			117	7	13	20	62	—	—	—	—	—

=== International ===
Year	Team	Event	Result	GP	G	A	Pts	PIM
2013	Canada Western	U17	9th	5	0	1	1	4
Junior totals				5	0	1	1	4
