= Zach Sawchenko =

Canadian ice hockey player (born 1997)

- Born: December 30, 1997 (age 28) Calgary, Alberta, Canada
- Height: 6 ft 1 in (185 cm)
- Weight: 183 lb (83 kg; 13 st 1 lb)
- Position: Goaltender
- Catches: Left
- NHL team (P) Cur. team Former teams: Carolina Hurricanes; Chicago Wolves (AHL); San Jose Sharks
- NHL draft: Undrafted
- Playing career: 2019–present

Zachary Sawchenko (born December 30, 1997) is a Canadian professional ice hockey player who is a goaltender for the Chicago Wolves of the American Hockey League (AHL), while under contract to the Carolina Hurricanes of the National Hockey League (NHL).

== Playing career ==
Sawchenko was signed as an undrafted free agent to a three-year, entry-level contract with the Sharks on April 12, 2021 and made his NHL debut on January 2, 2022, in an 8–5 loss to the Pittsburgh Penguins.

As a free agent, Sawchenko was signed to a one-year, two-way contract with the Carolina Hurricanes on July 14, 2022.

After a lone season within the Hurricanes organization, Sawchenko was signed as a free agent to a one-year, two-way contract with the Vancouver Canucks on July 1, 2023.

Following his season with Vancouver's organization, Sawchenko signed a one-year, two-way contract with the Columbus Blue Jackets for the 2024–25 season on July 7, 2024.

After two seasons within the Blue Jackets organization, Sawchenko was signed for the 2026–27 season to a one-year, two-way contract with the Carolina Hurricanes on July 4, 2026.

== Career statistics ==
=== Regular season and playoffs ===
			Regular season									Playoffs
Season	Team	League	GP	W	L	OT	MIN	GA	SO	GAA	SV%	GP	W	L	MIN	GA	SO	GAA	SV%
2012–13	Notre Dame Argos	SMAAAHL	27	—	—	—	—	—	—	3.42	.896	3	—	—	—	—	—	5.41	.806
2013–14	Moose Jaw Warriors	WHL	26	9	13	1	1257	76	0	3.63	.885	—	—	—	—	—	—	—	—
2014–15	Moose Jaw Warriors	WHL	49	21	22	2	2745	152	4	3.32	.896	—	—	—	—	—	—	—	—
2015–16	Moose Jaw Warriors	WHL	51	28	16	6	3019	153	2	3.04	.916	10	5	5	567	31	2	3.28	.911
2016–17	Moose Jaw Warriors	WHL	51	30	14	1	2985	139	3	2.79	.917	7	3	4	414	17	0	2.46	.923
2017–18	University of Alberta	USports	15	12	2	0	819	29	0	2.12	.911	1	0	0	60	1	0	1.00	.966
2018–19	University of Alberta	USports	19	16	2	1	1151	28	5	1.46	.926	5	4	1	—	—	2	1.61	.927
2019–20	Allen Americans	ECHL	13	8	2	3	792	31	2	2.35	.930	—	—	—	—	—	—	—	—
2019–20	San Jose Barracuda	AHL	13	6	4	2	753	36	1	2.87	.911	—	—	—	—	—	—	—	—
2020–21	Allen Americans	ECHL	7	5	2	0	423	18	0	2.55	.926	—	—	—	—	—	—	—	—
2020–21	San Jose Barracuda	AHL	5	1	3	0	255	11	0	2.59	.914	—	—	—	—	—	—	—	—
2021–22	San Jose Barracuda	AHL	14	4	10	0	700	47	0	4.03	.877	—	—	—	—	—	—	—	—
2021–22	San Jose Sharks	NHL	7	1	2	1	269	15	0	3.35	.901	—	—	—	—	—	—	—	—
2022–23	Chicago Wolves	AHL	41	17	18	3	2306	119	1	3.10	.895	—	—	—	—	—	—	—	—
2023–24	Abbotsford Canucks	AHL	6	4	1	0	283	10	0	2.12	.924	6	2	4	364	18	0	2.96	.898
2024–25	Cleveland Monsters	AHL	27	10	11	5	1521	76	1	3.00	.900	—	—	—	—	—	—	—	—
2025–26	Cleveland Monsters	AHL	29	14	10	3	1613	82	0	3.05	.880	8	5	3	536	18	1	2.01	.914
NHL totals			7	1	2	1	269	15	0	3.35	.901	—	—	—	—	—	—	—	—

=== International ===
Year	Team	Event	Result	GP	W	L	T	MIN	GA	SO	GAA	SV%
2014	Canada Pacific	U17	2nd place, silver medalist(s)	5	4	1	0	300	12	0	2.40	.929
2014	Canada	IH18	1st place, gold medalist(s)	4	—	—	—	—	—	—	2.25	.910
2015	Canada	U18	3rd place, bronze medalist(s)	5	4	1	0	283	17	0	3.61	.898
Junior totals				14	8	2	0	583	29	0	2.98	.914
