= Landon Bow =

Canadian ice hockey player

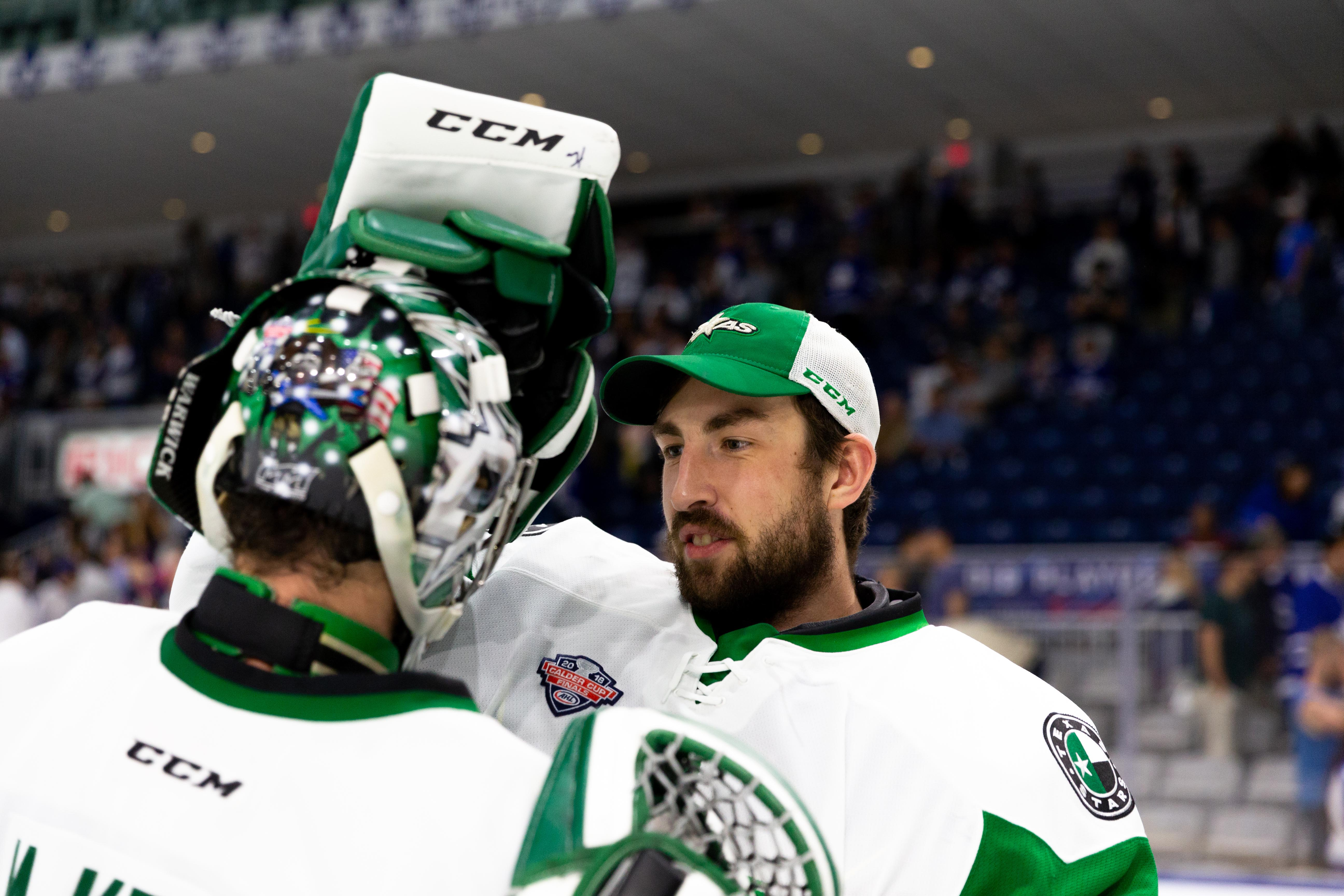
- Bow with the Texas Stars in 2018
- Born: August 24, 1995 (age 31) St. Albert, Alberta, Canada
- Height: 6 ft 5 in (196 cm)
- Weight: 210 lb (95 kg; 15 st 0 lb)
- Position: Goaltender
- EIHL team Former teams: Glasgow Clan; Dallas Stars
- NHL draft: Undrafted
- Playing career: 2016–present

Landon Bow (born August 24, 1995) is a Canadian professional ice hockey goaltender currently playing for the Glasgow Clan of the Elite Ice Hockey League (EIHL). He has previously played for the Dallas Stars of the National Hockey League (NHL).

== Playing career ==
=== Major junior ===
Bow was drafted 78th overall by the Swift Current Broncos in the 2010 WHL Draft. After playing nearly four seasons with the Broncos, Bow was traded to the Seattle Thunderbirds in exchange for Jamal Watson, Taz Burman, and a conditional 2nd round WHL Bantam Draft pick.

=== Professional ===
As an undrafted free agent, Bow was signed by the Texas Stars of the American Hockey League (AHL) to a one-year contract for the 2016–17 season. During his rookie season, Bow split his time between the Stars and their ECHL team, the Idaho Steelheads. For his efforts, Bow was named to the ECHL All-Rookie Team.

Following that season, Bow signed a two-year entry-level NHL contract with the Dallas Stars on March 10, 2017. After attending the Stars training camp, he was assigned to the AHL to play out the 2017–18 season. Bow was called up once as a backup after starter Ben Bishop was injured in January but was sent down to the AHL without making his debut. He helped guide the Texas Stars to the 2018 Calder Cup playoffs only to lose to the Toronto Marlies in seven games.

Bow began the 2018–19 season in the AHL with the Texas Stars after being cut from the Dallas Stars training camp. After playing in 12 games, Bow was recalled to the NHL on November 21, 2018, where he made his NHL debut the following night by replacing starter Anton Khudobin in a 5–1 loss to the Pittsburgh Penguins. Bow saved all 14 shots he faced. Eight days later, after appearing in no more games, Bow was reassigned to the Texas Stars on November 29.

An impending restricted free agent following the 2019–20 season, Bow was not tendered a qualifying offer by the Stars on October 7, 2020, and was released to free agency. However, he later signed a one-year, two-way contract with the Stars on October 24.

As a free agent from the Dallas Stars, following his fifth season with the organization, Bow left the club and signed his first contract abroad, agreeing to a one-year contract with Czech club Rytíři Kladno of the ELH on July 14, 2021.

== Career statistics ==
			Regular season									Playoffs
Season	Team	League	GP	W	L	OT	MIN	GA	SO	GAA	SV%	GP	W	L	MIN	GA	SO	GAA	SV%
2011–12	St. Albert Raiders	AMHL	14	—	—	—	—	—	—	2.47	.911	1	—	—	—	—	—	9.23	.667
2012–13	Swift Current Broncos	WHL	14	5	4	1	642	33	1	3.09	.897	—	—	—	—	—	—	—	—
2013–14	Swift Current Broncos	WHL	27	13	5	3	1405	73	0	3.12	.901	—	—	—	—	—	—	—	—
2014–15	Swift Current Broncos	WHL	66	31	27	5	3614	189	7	3.14	.911	4	0	4	244	15	0	3.69	.907
2015–16	Swift Current Broncos	WHL	30	9	14	4	1593	82	2	3.09	.913	—	—	—	—	—	—	—	—
2015–16	Seattle Thunderbirds	WHL	23	16	6	0	1293	38	5	1.76	.938	18	13	2	1131	37	2	1.96	.927
2016–17	Idaho Steelheads	ECHL	27	19	6	2	1556	54	3	2.08	.933	4	1	1	241	14	0	3.49	.886
2016–17	Texas Stars	AHL	16	7	7	0	870	46	0	3.17	.894	—	—	—	—	—	—	—	—
2017–18	Texas Stars	AHL	46	20	15	10	2685	128	1	2.86	.903	2	0	0	49	5	0	6.08	.833
2018–19	Texas Stars	AHL	46	24	15	5	2552	123	1	2.89	.893	—	—	—	—	—	—	—	—
2018–19	Dallas Stars	NHL	2	0	0	0	59	1	0	1.03	.947	—	—	—	—	—	—	—	—
2019–20	Texas Stars	AHL	30	12	11	3	1579	87	1	3.31	.895	—	—	—	—	—	—	—	—
2020–21	Texas Stars	AHL	2	1	1	0	112	6	0	3.20	.889	—	—	—	—	—	—	—	—
2021–22	Rytíři Kladno	ELH	56	20	36	0	3298	171	4	3.11	.905	—	—	—	—	—	—	—	—
2022–23	Rytíři Kladno	ELH	35	10	20	0	1870	110	0	3.53	.886	—	—	—	—	—	—	—	—
NHL totals			2	0	0	0	59	1	0	1.03	.947	—	—	—	—	—	—	—	—

== Awards and honours ==
Award	Year	Ref
ECHL
All-Rookie Team	2017	
