= Tanner Jeannot =

Canadian ice hockey player (born 1997)

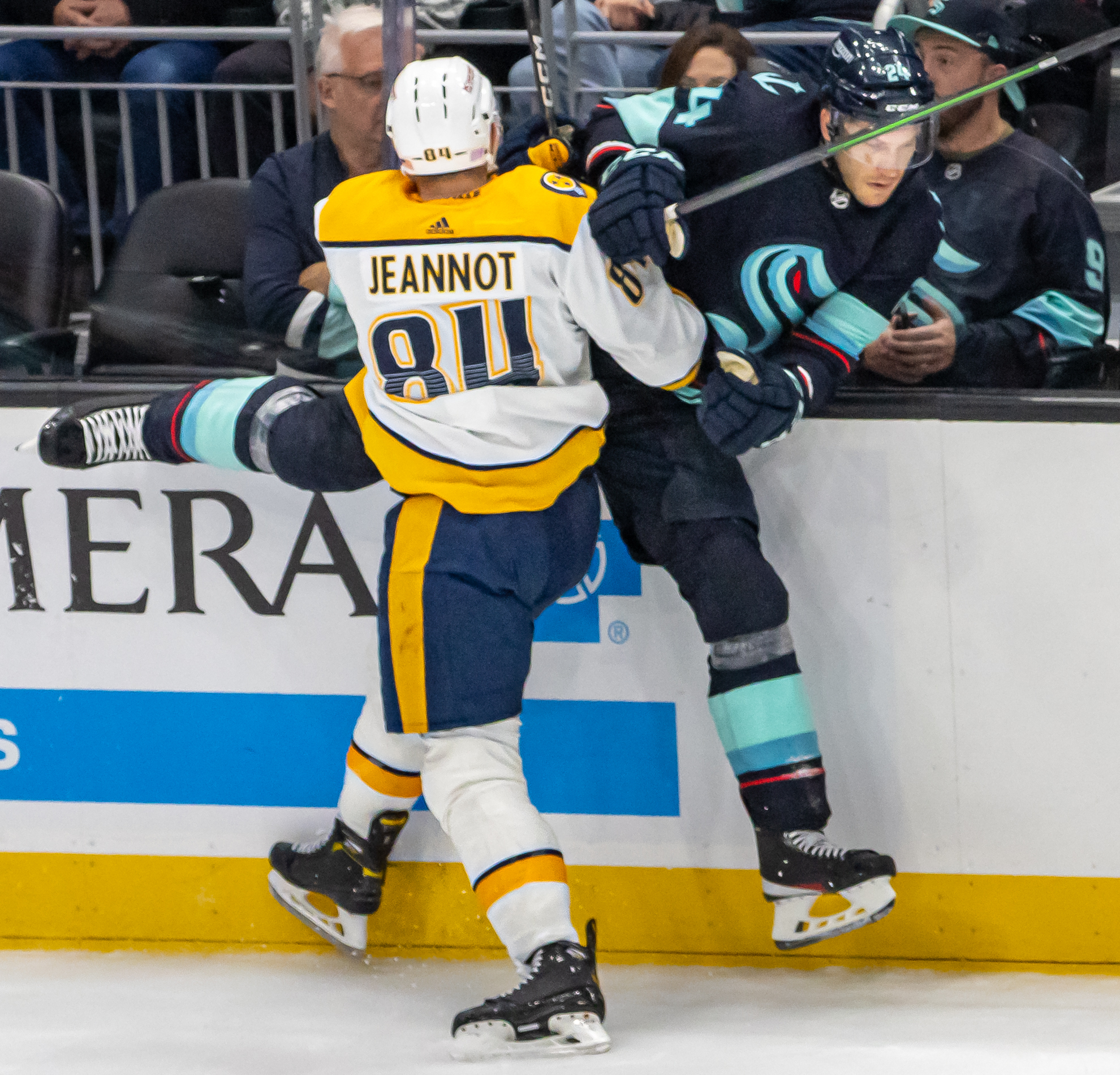
- Jeannot with the Nashville Predators in 2022
- Born: May 29, 1997 (age 29) Estevan, Saskatchewan, Canada
- Height: 6 ft 2 in (188 cm)
- Weight: 220 lb (100 kg; 15 st 10 lb)
- Position: Forward
- Shoots: Left
- NHL team Former teams: Boston Bruins; Nashville Predators; Tampa Bay Lightning; Los Angeles Kings
- NHL draft: Undrafted
- Playing career: 2018–present

Tanner Jeannot (English: /ʒɑːˈnoʊ/ zhah-NOH, French: [ʒano]; born May 29, 1997) is a Canadian professional ice hockey player who is a forward and alternate captain for the Boston Bruins of the National Hockey League (NHL).

== Playing career ==
=== Junior ===
Jeannot played his major junior hockey career with the Moose Jaw Warriors in the Western Hockey League (WHL). Despite not being selected in the NHL Draft, Jeannot's consistent play, leadership qualities, and ability to contribute offensively caught the attention of NHL scouts. His efforts were ultimately rewarded when, on April 2, 2018, the Nashville Predators signed him as an undrafted free agent to a three-year entry-level contract.

=== Nashville Predators (2021–2023) ===
During the 2020–21 season, Jeannot made his NHL debut with the Predators on March 2, 2021, playing on the fourth line in a 4–2 loss to the Carolina Hurricanes. The following season, he led all NHL rookies with 24 goals and 318 hits, but did not place among the top three finalists for the Calder Memorial Trophy.

=== Tampa Bay Lightning (2023–2024) ===
During the 2022–23 season, Jeannot, in the final year of his entry-level deal with the Predators, struggled to replicate his rookie scoring form, managing just five goals and 14 points in 56 games. As Nashville began to fall out of playoff contention, they traded Jeannot to the Tampa Bay Lightning on February 26, 2023, in exchange for defenceman Cal Foote and a bundle of five draft picks, including a lottery-protected first-rounder in 2025.

=== Los Angeles Kings (2024–2025) ===
On June 29, 2024, the Lightning traded Jeannot to the Los Angeles Kings as part of a strategic move to bolster their future draft assets. In return for Jeannot, the Lightning received a fourth-round selection in the 2024 NHL entry draft and a second-round pick in the 2025 NHL entry draft.

On November 7, 2024, Jeannot was assessed a match penalty after delivering an illegal check to the head of Vancouver Canucks forward Brock Boeser and received a three game suspension.

=== Boston Bruins (2025–Present) ===
On July 1, 2025, Jeannot signed as a free agent to a five-year, $17 million contract with the Boston Bruins.

== Career statistics ==
			Regular season					Playoffs
Season	Team	League	GP	G	A	Pts	PIM	GP	G	A	Pts	PIM
2013–14	Yorkton Harvest	SMAAAHL	44	15	21	36	52	3	1	1	2	2
2013–14	Kindersley Klippers	SJHL	—	—	—	—	—	2	0	0	0	0
2014–15	Moose Jaw Warriors	WHL	52	1	4	5	8	—	—	—	—	—
2015–16	Moose Jaw Warriors	WHL	72	17	16	33	65	10	6	9	15	11
2016–17	Moose Jaw Warriors	WHL	71	19	33	52	84	7	0	1	1	8
2017–18	Moose Jaw Warriors	WHL	72	40	40	80	83	13	3	5	8	12
2018–19	Milwaukee Admirals	AHL	37	7	4	11	39	3	0	0	0	0
2019–20	Florida Everblades	ECHL	3	4	1	5	6	—	—	—	—	—
2019–20	Milwaukee Admirals	AHL	57	5	15	20	87	—	—	—	—	—
2020–21	Florida Everblades	ECHL	5	3	3	6	6	—	—	—	—	—
2020–21	Chicago Wolves	AHL	13	10	11	21	33	—	—	—	—	—
2020–21	Nashville Predators	NHL	15	5	2	7	2	5	0	1	1	2
2021–22	Nashville Predators	NHL	81	24	17	41	130	4	0	1	1	0
2022–23	Nashville Predators	NHL	56	5	9	14	85	—	—	—	—	—
2022–23	Tampa Bay Lightning	NHL	20	1	3	4	22	3	0	0	0	5
2023–24	Tampa Bay Lightning	NHL	55	7	7	14	75	4	0	1	1	2
2024–25	Los Angeles Kings	NHL	67	7	6	13	89	—	—	—	—	—
2025–26	Boston Bruins	NHL	77	6	16	22	66	6	1	0	1	6
NHL totals			371	55	60	115	469	22	1	3	4	15
