= Reid Duke (ice hockey) =

Canadian ice hockey player (born 1996)

- Born: January 28, 1996 (age 30) Calgary, Alberta, Canada
- Height: 6 ft 0 in (183 cm)
- Weight: 201 lb (91 kg; 14 st 5 lb)
- Position: Centre
- Shoots: Right
- ECHL team Former teams: Florida Everblades; Chicago Wolves; Henderson Silver Knights; HK Nitra; HC Slovan Bratislava; Starbulls Rosenheim; Cardiff Devils
- NHL draft: 169th overall, 2014; Minnesota Wild
- Playing career: 2018–present

Reid Duke (born January 28, 1996) is a Canadian professional ice hockey centre who is currently playing for Florida Everblades of the ECHL.

He most recently played for the Henderson Silver Knights in the American Hockey League (AHL). Reid was the first player to sign a contract with the expansion Vegas Golden Knights of the National Hockey League (NHL) in 2017.

== Playing career ==
Duke started his junior ice hockey career with the Lethbridge Hurricanes of the Western Hockey League after being selected fifth in the 2011 WHL Bantam Draft. He was traded to Brandon three years later, after being selected in the sixth round of the 2014 NHL entry draft by the Minnesota Wild. In 2016, he won the WHL Championship, the Ed Chynoweth Cup, with the Wheat Kings.

During his final year of junior hockey in the 2016–17 season, he became the first player in franchise history to be signed by the Vegas Golden Knights after agreeing to a three-year entry-level contract on March 6, 2017. At the conclusion of his season and junior career with the Wheat Kings, Duke signed a professional try-out contract on April 7, 2017, with the Chicago Wolves in the American Hockey League, then serving as the affiliate to the St. Louis Blues, but did not appear in any games that season for the Wolves. The Wolves then became the affiliate for Golden Knights for the next three seasons. Duke did not make his professional debut with the Wolves until February 2018 as he injured his shoulder and required surgery after attending his first rookie camp with the Golden Knights in the 2017 offseason. Duke played in 99 games and scored 31 points over his three seasons with the Wolves. He then played for the Golden Knights' new AHL affiliate, the Henderson Silver Knights, in the shortened 2020–21 season.

After his entry-level contract with the Golden Knights ended in 2021, he was not re-signed. On September 17, 2021, he signed an AHL contract to stay with the Silver Knights for the 2021–22 season.

In July 2024, Duke agreed terms with UK Elite Ice Hockey League (EIHL) side Cardiff Devils.

== Career statistics ==
=== Regular season and playoffs ===
| | | | Regular season | | | | | Playoffs |
| Season | Team | League | GP | G | A | Pts | PIM | GP | G | A | Pts | PIM |
|---|---|---|---|---|---|---|---|---|---|---|---|---|
| 2011–12 | Lethbridge Hurricanes | WHL | 12 | 2 | 4 | 6 | 8 | — | — | — | — | — |
| 2012–13 | Lethbridge Hurricanes | WHL | 57 | 8 | 16 | 24 | 30 | — | — | — | — | — |
| 2013–14 | Lethbridge Hurricanes | WHL | 62 | 15 | 25 | 40 | 91 | — | — | — | — | — |
| 2014–15 | Lethbridge Hurricanes | WHL | 1 | 0 | 0 | 0 | 0 | — | — | — | — | — |
| 2014–15 | Brandon Wheat Kings | WHL | 52 | 20 | 31 | 51 | 66 | 6 | 0 | 1 | 1 | 4 |
| 2015–16 | Brandon Wheat Kings | WHL | 68 | 33 | 29 | 62 | 18 | 21 | 8 | 16 | 24 | 24 |
| 2016–17 | Brandon Wheat Kings | WHL | 59 | 37 | 34 | 71 | 81 | 4 | 3 | 0 | 3 | 8 |
| 2017–18 | Chicago Wolves | AHL | 14 | 0 | 0 | 0 | 4 | 2 | 0 | 0 | 0 | 0 |
| 2018–19 | Chicago Wolves | AHL | 44 | 7 | 9 | 16 | 33 | — | — | — | — | — |
| 2019–20 | Chicago Wolves | AHL | 39 | 8 | 7 | 15 | 56 | — | — | — | — | — |
| 2020–21 | Henderson Silver Knights | AHL | 17 | 4 | 4 | 8 | 13 | 4 | 0 | 0 | 0 | 6 |
| 2021–22 | Henderson Silver Knights | AHL | 45 | 6 | 4 | 10 | 39 | — | — | — | — | — |
| 2022–23 | HK Nitra | Slovak | 16 | 2 | 3 | 5 | 37 | — | — | — | — | — |
| 2022–23 | HC Slovan Bratislava | Slovak | 14 | 0 | 4 | 4 | 16 | 5 | 0 | 0 | 0 | 25 |
| AHL totals | | | 159 | 25 | 24 | 49 | 145 | 6 | 0 | 0 | 0 | 6 |

=== International ===
| Year | Team | Event | Result | GP | G | A | Pts | PIM |
|---|---|---|---|---|---|---|---|---|
| 2013 | Canada Pacific | U17 | 2nd place, silver medalist(s) | 5 | 2 | 3 | 5 | 0 |
| Junior totals | | | | 5 | 2 | 3 | 5 | 0 |
