= Cody Porter =

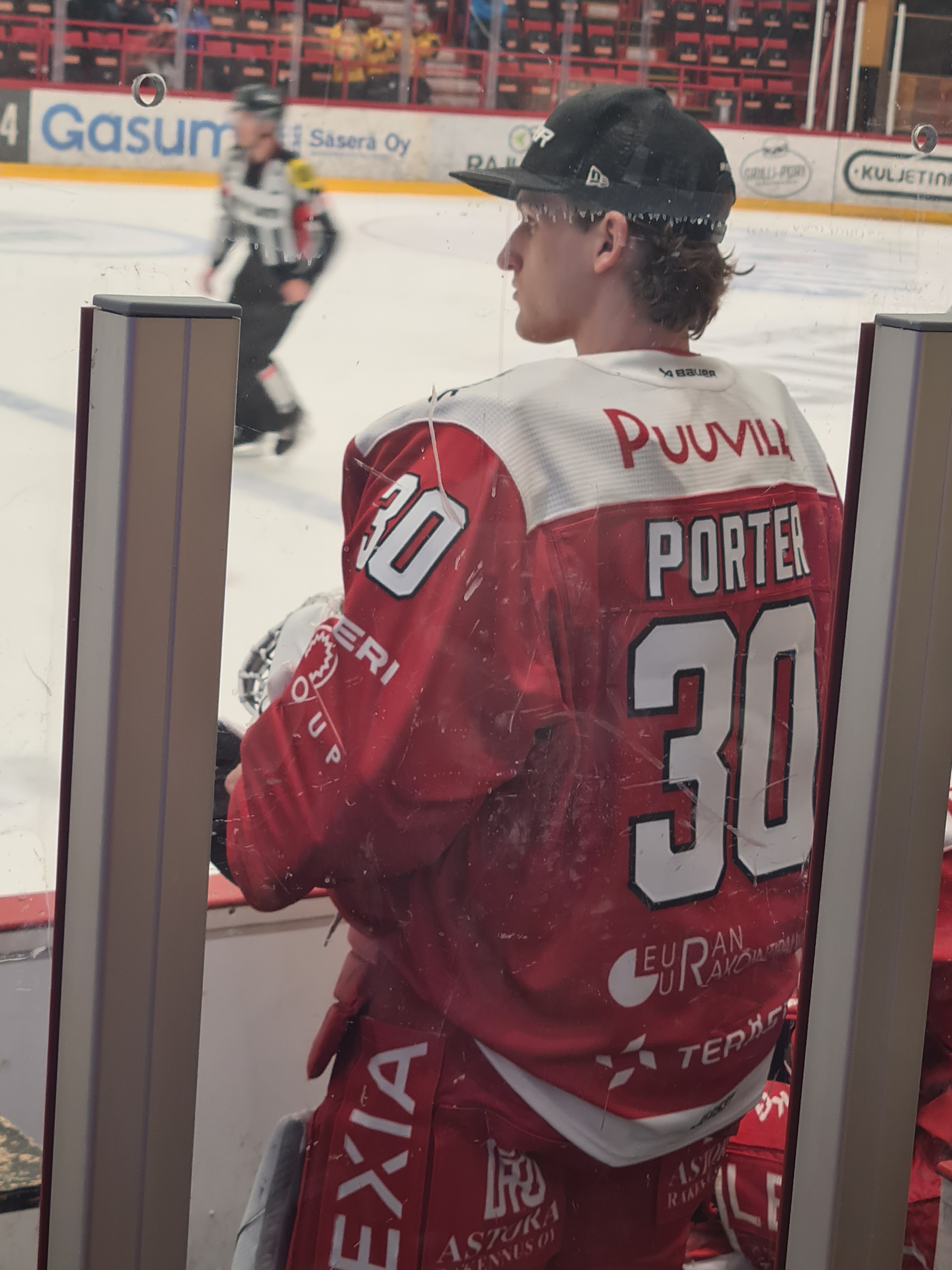
- Porter with Porin Ässät in 2023
- Born: 23 September 1997 (age 28) North Vancouver, Canada
- Height: 191 cm (6 ft 3 in)
- Weight: 88 kg (194 lb; 13 st 12 lb)
- Position: Goaltender
- Catches: Left
- DEL2 team Former teams: Starbulls Rosenheim; KH Zagłębie Sosnowiec; IPK Iisalmi; SaiPa; Tappara; Porin Ässät; RoKi; Västerviks IK; VHK Vsetín; HC Almaty
- Playing career: 2020–present

Cody Porter (born 23 September 1997) is a Canadian professional ice hockey goaltender currently playing for ESV Kaufbeuren in DEL2. Porter has previously represented SaiPa, Tappara and Ässät in the Finnish Elite League, KH Zagłębie Sosnowiec in the Polska Hokej Liga, IPK Iisalmi, RoKi in the Mestis and Starbulls Rosenheim in DEL2.

== Career ==
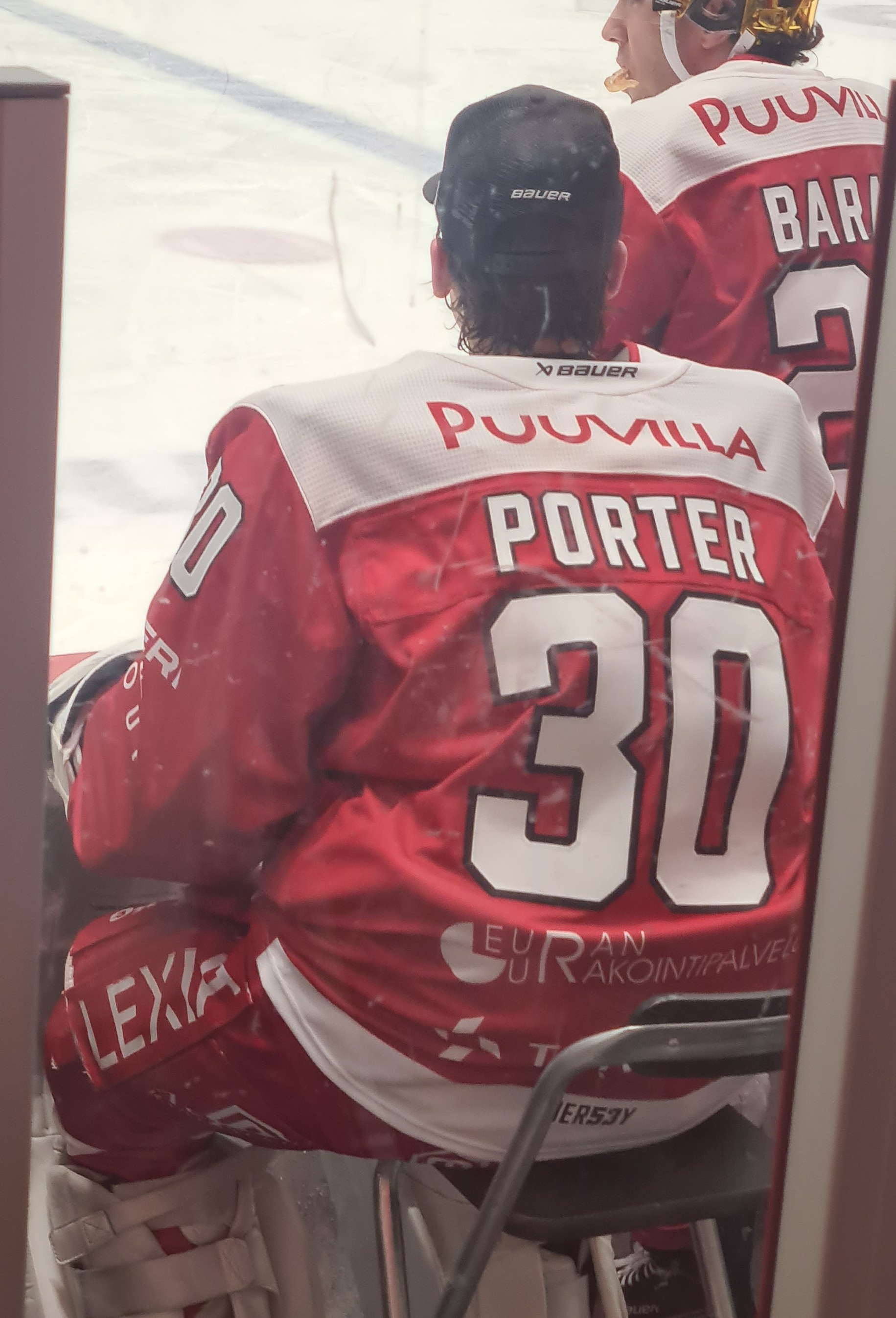
Cody Porter on February 17th 2023 on Ässät's bench

For the 2022–2023 season, Porter moved to the Rovaniemen Kiekko's Mestis team with a one-year contract.In February 2023, RoKi loaned Porter to Tappara with a contract extending to February 12. Tappara signed Porter to patch up injuries on the goaltender front.

On February 13, Ässät announced that Porter would join the team with a contract covering the rest of the 2022–23 Liiga season. Porter was brought to the team to replace Niklas Rubin's injury. Porter played for Ässät in three regular season games and posted a 90.0 SV% and a 2.53 GAA. On March 6, Porter was loaned back to RoKi for the rest of the Mestis season. During the entire 2022–23 season with RoKi, including his first contract and the loan, he played 21 regular season games with a 92.2 SV% and a 2.20 GAA.
