= Andrew Nielsen (ice hockey) =

Canadian ice hockey player

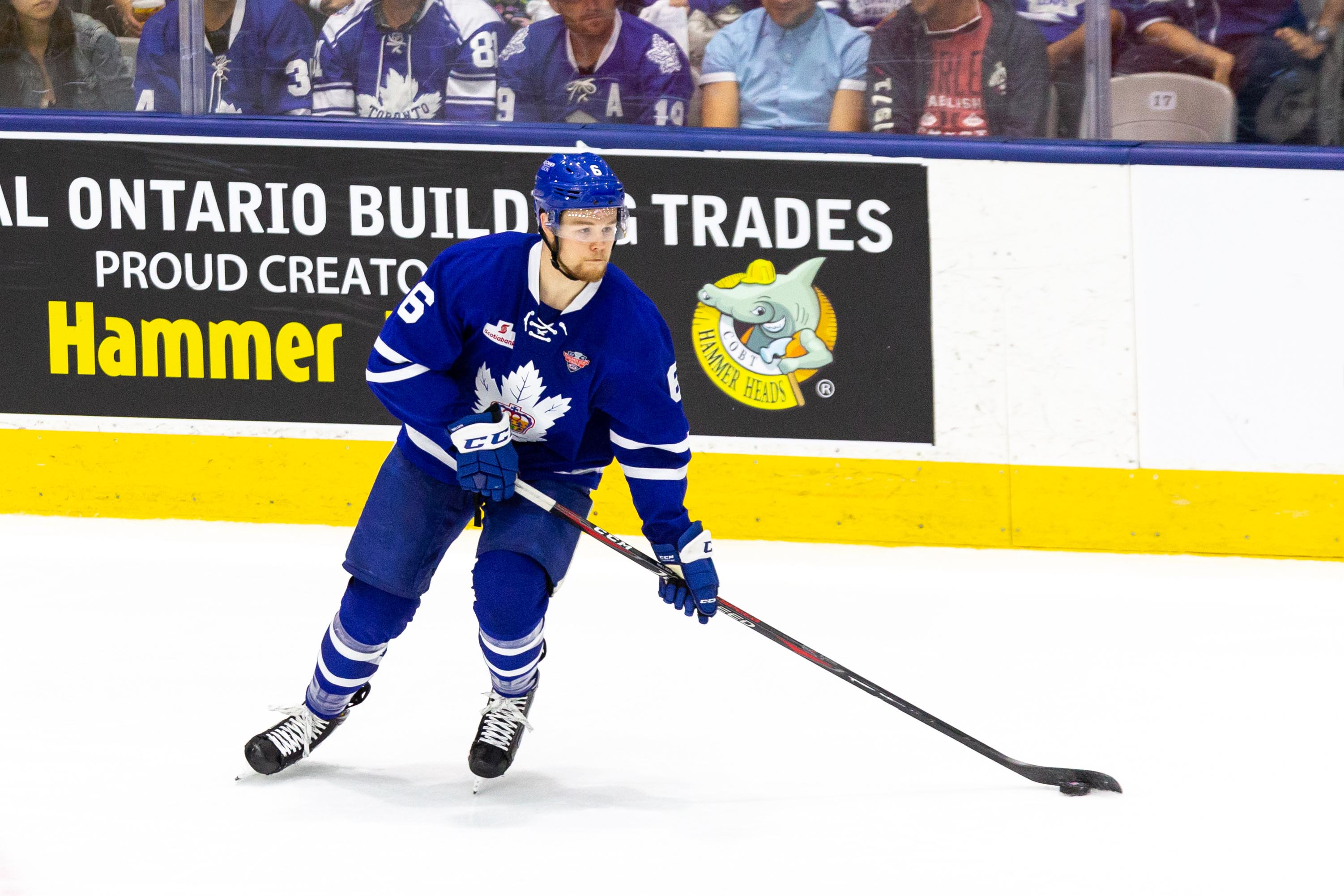
- Nielsen with the Toronto Marlies in 2018
- Born: November 13, 1996 (age 30) Red Deer, Alberta, Canada
- Height: 6 ft 3 in (191 cm)
- Weight: 224 lb (102 kg; 16 st 0 lb)
- Position: Defence
- Shoots: Left
- EIHL team Former teams: Coventry Blaze; Toronto Marlies; Stockton Heat; Black Wings 1992; Hershey Bears; Tucson Roadrunners; San Diego Gulls; WBS Penguins; Cleveland Monsters; Trois-Rivières Lions
- NHL draft: 65th overall, 2015; Toronto Maple Leafs
- Playing career: 2016–present

Andrew Jeffrey Nielsen (born November 13, 1996) is a Canadian professional ice hockey defenceman who is currently playing for the Coventry Blaze in the Elite Ice Hockey League (EIHL). Nielsen was selected by the Toronto Maple Leafs in the third round, 65th overall, in the 2015 NHL entry draft.

== Playing career ==
Nielsen started playing with the Lethbridge Hurricanes of the Western Hockey League (WHL) near the end of the 2013–14 season. On November 24, 2015, Nielsen was signed to a three-year entry-level contract with the Toronto Maple Leafs.

During the 2018–19 season, on November 27, 2018, Nielsen was traded by the Maple Leafs to the Calgary Flames in exchange for Morgan Klimchuk.

After five season and 226 regular season games in the AHL with the Toronto Marlies and Stockton Heat, Nielsen as an impending restricted free agent from the Calgary Flames, embarked on his first professional venture abroad in agreeing to a one-year deal with Austrian club, Black Wings 1992 of the ICE Hockey League, on August 27, 2020. Nielsen made 15 appearances for the Black Wings, posting 1 goal and 3 points before opting to return to North America.

Nielsen returned to the AHL, initially joining the Tucson Roadrunners training camp for the pandemic delayed 2020–21 season. Remaining on the roster to open the season, Nielsen was later released without featuring for the Roadrunners. On March 5, 2021, Nielsen was signed to a PTO with the Hershey Bears, affiliate to the Washington Capitals. He featured in 6 games with the Bears going scoreless to end the season.

As a free agent over the summer, Nielsen opted to continue in the AHL as a free agent, securing a one-year contract with the Colorado Eagles on September 16, 2021. After attending the Eagles training camp, Nielsen was assigned to ECHL affiliate, the Utah Grizzlies, to begin the 2021–22 season. Nielsen established himself on the top pairing with the Grizzlies, finding an offensive touch in recording 8 goals and 27 points through 36 games. Unable to feature in a game with the Eagles, Nielsen was released from his AHL contract with Colorado and was later signed to a professional try-out deal with the Ontario Reign on February 12, 2022. Nielsen was later released from Ontario's roster without featuring for the club and joined his third AHL club, the Tucson Roadrunners on a PTO, on February 23, 2022. He continued with the Roadrunners for the remainder of the season, adding 6 points through 16 games.

On October 9, 2022, Nielsen as a free agent opted to return with the Utah Grizzlies of the ECHL, signing a one-year contract for the 2022–23 season. While leading the Grizzlies in scoring with 18 points through 15 games, Nielsen was signed to a PTO with the San Diego Gulls on November 29, 2022. He made his Gulls debut against the Colorado Eagles on November 30, 2022, before he was released from his PTO and returned to the Grizzlies on December 2, 2022. Nielsen later made professional tryout appearances with the Wilkes-Barre/Scranton Penguins and Cleveland Monsters, with his ECHL rights traded during his loan to the AHL, from the Grizzlies to the Cincinnati Cyclones on March 17, 2023. He later joined the Cyclones in the playoffs, contributing with 6 points through 11 appearances.

As a free agent Nielsen continued his minor league career in the ECHL, agreeing to a contract with Trois-Rivières Lions, an affiliate within the Montreal Canadiens organization on July 13, 2023.

== Career statistics ==
			Regular season					Playoffs
Season	Team	League	GP	G	A	Pts	PIM	GP	G	A	Pts	PIM
2013–14	Red Deer Chiefs	AMHL	35	3	15	18	34	—	—	—	—	—
2013–14	Lethbridge Hurricanes	WHL	1	0	0	0	0	—	—	—	—	—
2014–15	Lethbridge Hurricanes	WHL	59	7	17	24	101	—	—	—	—	—
2015–16	Lethbridge Hurricanes	WHL	71	18	52	70	122	5	1	2	3	6
2015–16	Toronto Marlies	AHL	5	0	2	2	0	—	—	—	—	—
2016–17	Toronto Marlies	AHL	74	14	25	39	82	11	1	3	4	24
2017–18	Toronto Marlies	AHL	65	6	20	26	143	8	0	1	1	2
2018–19	Toronto Marlies	AHL	8	0	3	3	12	—	—	—	—	—
2018–19	Stockton Heat	AHL	29	0	4	4	56	—	—	—	—	—
2019–20	Stockton Heat	AHL	45	0	5	5	54	—	—	—	—	—
2020–21	Black Wings 1992	ICEHL	15	1	2	3	39	—	—	—	—	—
2020–21	Hershey Bears	AHL	6	0	0	0	10	—	—	—	—	—
2021–22	Utah Grizzlies	ECHL	36	8	19	27	114	—	—	—	—	—
2021–22	Tucson Roadrunners	AHL	16	1	5	6	14	—	—	—	—	—
2022–23	Utah Grizzlies	ECHL	47	9	32	41	166	—	—	—	—	—
2022–23	San Diego Gulls	AHL	1	0	0	0	2	—	—	—	—	—
2022–23	Wilkes-Barre/Scranton Penguins	AHL	5	0	0	0	5	—	—	—	—	—
2022–23	Cleveland Monsters	AHL	4	0	0	0	0	—	—	—	—	—
2022–23	Cincinnati Cyclones	ECHL	—	—	—	—	—	11	2	4	6	58
AHL totals			258	21	64	85	378	19	1	4	5	26

== Awards and honours ==
Honours	Year
WHL
First All-Star Team (East)	2015–16
AHL
Calder Cup (Toronto Marlies)	2018
