= Rourke Chartier =

Canadian ice hockey player (born 1996)

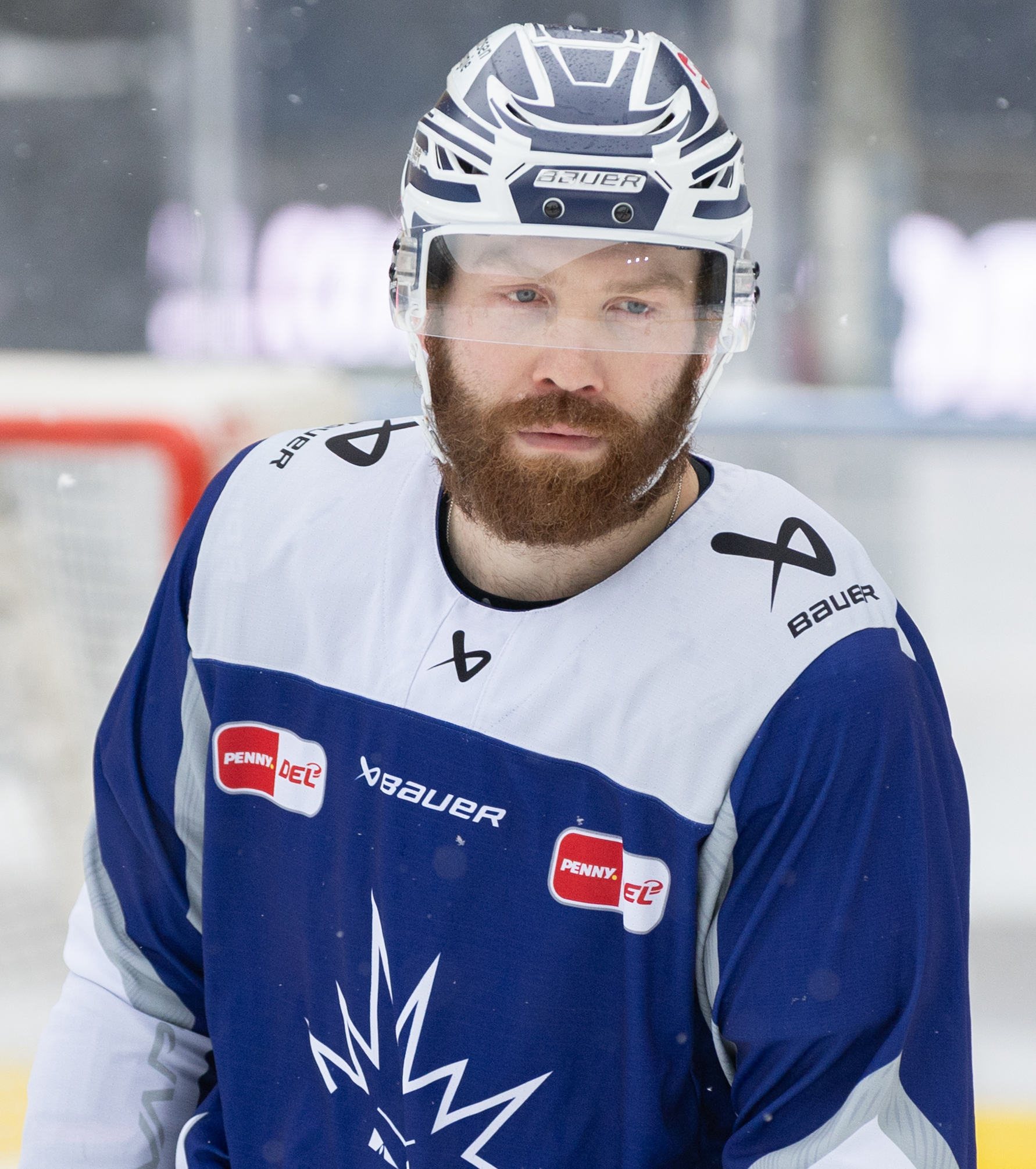
- Chartier with the Dresdner Eislöwen in 2026
- Born: April 3, 1996 (age 30) Saskatoon, Saskatchewan, Canada
- Height: 6 ft 0 in (183 cm)
- Weight: 190 lb (86 kg; 13 st 8 lb)
- Position: Centre
- Shoots: Left
- DEL team Former teams: Dresdner Eislöwen; San Jose Sharks; Ottawa Senators; Kunlun Red Star; CSKA Moscow
- NHL draft: 149th overall, 2014; San Jose Sharks
- Playing career: 2016–present

Rourke Chartier (born April 3, 1996) is a Canadian professional ice hockey player. He plays centre with Dresdner Eislöwen of the Deutsche Eishockey Liga (DEL). He previously played for the Ottawa Senators and San Jose Sharks of the National Hockey League (NHL) and Kunlun Red Star and HC CSKA Moscow of the Kontinental Hockey League. Chartier was selected by the Sharks in the fifth round (149th overall) of the 2014 NHL entry draft.

== Early life ==
Chartier was born in Saskatoon, Saskatchewan and played junior ice hockey with the Saskatoon Contacts.

== Playing career ==
=== Amateur ===
Chartier was selected by the Kelowna Rockets of the Western Hockey League (WHL) in the first round, 15th overall, of the 2011 WHL bantam draft. He made his major junior hockey debut in the 2012–13 season with Kelowna, scoring 13 goals and 17 assists for 30 points. The Rockets made the playoffs and advanced to the second round facing the Kamloops Blazers. The Blazers eliminated Kelowna in four games, with Chartier only appearing in three of the team's playoff games, going scoreless. In his second season with Kelowna in 2013–14, Chartier recorded 24 goals and 58 points in 72 games. The Rockets qualified for the playoffs and advanced to the Western Conference finals against the Portland Winterhawks. The Winterhawks eliminated the Rockets and Chartier added six goals and 12 points in 14 playoff games.

During the 2014–15 season while playing with Kelowna, Chartier scored 48 goals and 82 points in 58 games, and was named to the WHL Western Conference First All-Star Team. He was further honoured when he was named the 2014–15 CHL Sportsman of the Year. The Rockets, led by Chartier, Leon Draisaitl and Nick Merkley, advanced to the WHL championship finals against the Brandon Wheat Kings. Chartier added 13 goals and 20 points in 16 playoff games. The Rockets won the Ed Chynoweth Cup as league champions and moved on to the 2015 Memorial Cup tournament, representing the WHL. Kelowna again advanced to the final, facing the Oshawa Generals of the Ontario Hockey League. They were defeated 2–1 in overtime, finishing second in the tournament. He was also awarded the WHL's Brad Hornung Trophy as the league's most sportsmanlike player.

He returned to Kelowna for the 2015–16 season, but missed 19 games with an upper body injury. In 42 games with the Rockets, he tallied 25 goals and 46 points. Kelowna made the playoffs again and advanced to the Western Conference final against the Seattle Thunderbirds. The Thunderbirds eliminated the Rockets and Chartier added seven goals and 13 points in 18 playoff games.

=== Professional ===
Chartier was drafted by San Jose Sharks in the fifth round, 149th overall, of the 2014 NHL entry draft. On December 31, 2014, Chartier was signed by the San Jose Sharks to a three-year entry-level contract. He joined San Jose's American Hockey League (AHL) affiliate, San Jose Barracuda for the 2016 Calder Cup playoffs. He made his professional debut with the team during the playoffs, going scoreless in the one game. He was assigned the Barracuda for the 2016–17 season and recorded 17 goals and 35 points in 67 games. The Barracuda qualified for the 2017 Calder Cup playoffs and in the first round series against the Stockton Heat, Chartier suffered a concussion that kept him out of the lineup into the 2017–18 season. In seven playoff games, he tallied six points (all assists). He suffered another concussion on May 17, 2017 that prevented him from participating the 2017 Sharks training camp. He returned in November 2017 and suffered another head injury that kept him out until February 2018. He spent the entire 2017–18 season with the Barracuda, recording seven goals and 21 points in 26 games. The Barracuda qualified for the 2018 Calder Cup playoffs and he made three appearances, scoring two goals and three points. He made the Sharks out of camp during the 2018–19 season, making his NHL debut on October 8, 2018 versus the New York Islanders. He scored his first NHL goal on October 28, 2018 versus John Gibson of the Anaheim Ducks. He played in 13 games before being sent to the Barracuda. He was recalled by the Sharks on December 12, 2018 before being returned to the Barracuda on December 21. He suffered another concussion in February 2019 that ended his season.

Chartier as a free agent from the Sharks sat out the entirety of the 2019–20 season, due to lingering post-concussion symptoms. On October 14, 2020, Chartier returned to the professional circuit by signing to a one-year AHL contract with Toronto Marlies. In the pandemic-shortened 2020–21 season, Chartier made 28 appearances with the Marlies and finished with 2 goals and 8 points.

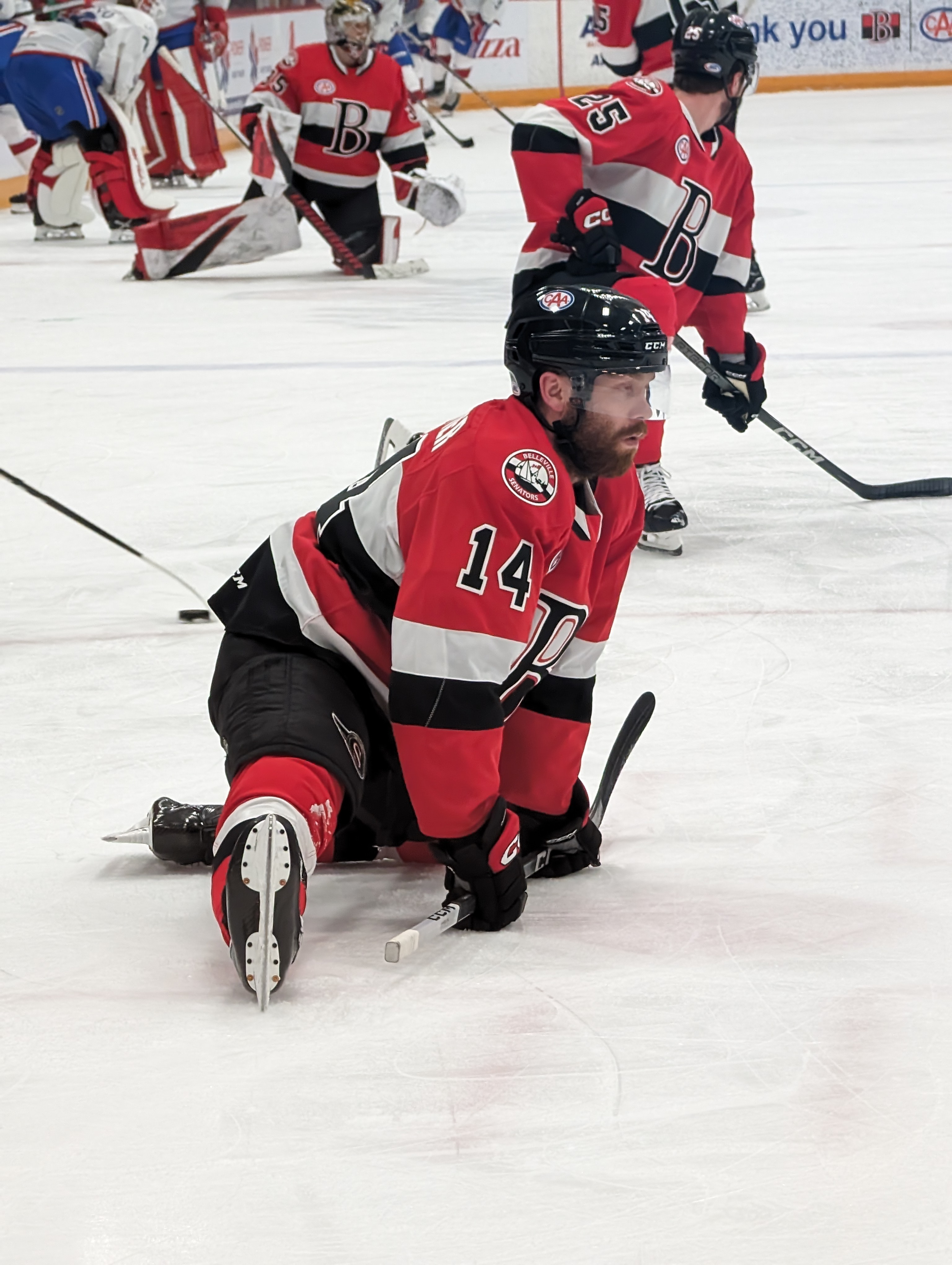
Rourke Chartier with the Belleville Senators in 2024

Approaching the 2021–22 season, Chartier attended Belleville Senators' training camp and made the opening night roster on a professional try-out basis. In elevating his play, Chartier solidified his role within Belleville and after posting 10 goals and 23 points through 30 games was belatedly signed to a AHL contract on March 15, 2022. After a successful debut season with Belleville, Chartier would continue with the club after signing a one-year, two-way contract with their NHL affiliate, Ottawa Senators for the 2022–23 season, on July 15, 2022. On December 12, 2022, Chartier was recalled by Ottawa. He played his first game for Ottawa that day in a 3–0 win over the Anaheim Ducks. In his sixth game with Ottawa, he suffered an injury. He was placed on injured reserve on December 27, 2022 and was only activated on January 23, 2023 and immediately assigned to Belleville.

On July 1, 2023, Chartier re-signed with Ottawa on a one-year two-way contract. Chartier scored his first goal for Ottawa against Dustin Wolf on November 14 in a 4–1 win over the Calgary Flames. Chartier suffered an upper body injury on December 15 in a game versus Dallas Stars. He was placed on injured reserve on the following day. Chartier returned from injury on January 13 and played that night against the San Jose Sharks. On January 30, Chartier was placed on waivers and after going unclaimed, was assigned to Belleville on January 31. Chartier was recalled on March 5 to replace Zack MacEwen. Chartier was sent to and recalled from Belleville in a paper transaction at the trade deadline on March 9 that allowed him to play in the AHL playoffs. In mid-March he suffered another upper body injury that kept him out until April 4, when he was assigned to Belleville.

On July 18, 2024, having left the Senators organization after three seasons, Chartier signed as a free agent with Chinese-based club, Kunlun Red Star of the Kontinental Hockey League, on an initial one-year contract. After recording 17 points in 37 games for Kunlun, Chartier was traded on December 26 to HC CSKA Moscow for cash. He made 19 appearances for CSKA Moscow, scoring one goal. In one playoff appearance for the team, he went scoreless.

As a free agent, Chartier joined Dresdner Eislöwen of the Deutsche Eishockey Liga on November 11, 2025.

== International play ==
Chartier was selected for Canada's under-18 team for the 2013 Ivan Hlinka Memorial Tournament, in which Canada won the gold medal. Ahead of the 2015 World Junior Championships, he was one of the last players cut from Canada's junior team. The following year he was chosen to play for Canada at the 2016 World Junior Championships. He played sparingly as an extra forward and when on the ice, was used primarily as a penalty killer. He appeared in five games at the tournament, recording two points (both assists). Canada advanced to the quarterfinals where they were eliminated by Finland. Canada finished sixth in the tournament.

== Career statistics ==
=== Regular season and playoffs ===
| | | | Regular season | | | | | Playoffs |
| Season | Team | League | GP | G | A | Pts | PIM | GP | G | A | Pts | PIM |
|---|---|---|---|---|---|---|---|---|---|---|---|---|
| 2010–11 | Saskatoon Contacts | SMHL | 7 | 2 | 0 | 2 | 4 | 1 | 1 | 1 | 2 | 0 |
| 2011–12 | Saskatoon Contacts | SMHL | 42 | 23 | 34 | 57 | 14 | 13 | 8 | 5 | 13 | 2 |
| 2012–13 | Kelowna Rockets | WHL | 58 | 13 | 17 | 30 | 16 | 3 | 0 | 0 | 0 | 0 |
| 2013–14 | Kelowna Rockets | WHL | 72 | 24 | 34 | 58 | 8 | 14 | 6 | 6 | 12 | 2 |
| 2014–15 | Kelowna Rockets | WHL | 58 | 48 | 34 | 82 | 18 | 16 | 13 | 7 | 20 | 2 |
| 2015–16 | Kelowna Rockets | WHL | 42 | 25 | 21 | 46 | 16 | 18 | 7 | 6 | 13 | 7 |
| 2015–16 | San Jose Barracuda | AHL | — | — | — | — | — | 1 | 0 | 0 | 0 | 0 |
| 2016–17 | San Jose Barracuda | AHL | 67 | 17 | 18 | 35 | 10 | 7 | 0 | 6 | 6 | 4 |
| 2017–18 | San Jose Barracuda | AHL | 28 | 7 | 14 | 21 | 2 | 3 | 2 | 1 | 3 | 0 |
| 2018–19 | San Jose Sharks | NHL | 13 | 1 | 0 | 1 | 2 | — | — | — | — | — |
| 2018–19 | San Jose Barracuda | AHL | 26 | 6 | 12 | 18 | 4 | — | — | — | — | — |
| 2020–21 | Toronto Marlies | AHL | 28 | 2 | 6 | 8 | 4 | — | — | — | — | — |
| 2021–22 | Belleville Senators | AHL | 33 | 10 | 15 | 25 | 4 | 2 | 1 | 1 | 2 | 0 |
| 2022–23 | Belleville Senators | AHL | 40 | 20 | 8 | 28 | 0 | — | — | — | — | — |
| 2022–23 | Ottawa Senators | NHL | 6 | 0 | 0 | 0 | 0 | — | — | — | — | — |
| 2023–24 | Ottawa Senators | NHL | 37 | 2 | 1 | 3 | 14 | — | — | — | — | — |
| 2023–24 | Belleville Senators | AHL | 19 | 7 | 6 | 13 | 2 | 7 | 1 | 0 | 1 | 0 |
| 2024–25 | Kunlun Red Star | KHL | 37 | 8 | 9 | 17 | 2 | — | — | — | — | — |
| 2024–25 | CSKA Moscow | KHL | 19 | 1 | 0 | 1 | 0 | 1 | 0 | 0 | 0 | 0 |
| NHL totals | | | 56 | 3 | 1 | 4 | 16 | — | — | — | — | — |
| KHL totals | | | 56 | 9 | 9 | 18 | 2 | 1 | 0 | 0 | 0 | 0 |

=== International ===
| Year | Team | Event | Result | GP | G | A | Pts | PIM |
|---|---|---|---|---|---|---|---|---|
| 2013 | Canada Western | U17 | 8th | 5 | 1 | 2 | 3 | 2 |
| 2013 | Canada | IH18 | 1st place, gold medalist(s) | 5 | 0 | 1 | 1 | 0 |
| 2016 | Canada | WJC | 6th | 5 | 0 | 2 | 2 | 2 |
| Junior totals | | | | 15 | 1 | 5 | 6 | 4 |

== Awards and honours ==
| Award | Year |
|---|---|
WHL
| First Team All Star (West) | 2014–15 |
| Brad Hornung Trophy | 2014–15 |
| Ed Chynoweth Cup (Kelowna Rockets) | 2014–15 |
| CHL Sportsman of the Year | 2014–15 |
