= Taran Kozun =

Canadian ice hockey player

- Born: August 29, 1994 (age 31) Nipawin, Saskatchewan, Canada
- Height: 6 ft 1 in (185 cm)
- Weight: 174 lb (79 kg; 12 st 6 lb)
- Position: Goaltender
- Catches: Left
- France team Former teams: Gothiques d'Amiens; Utah Grizzlies; Kansas City Mavericks; Pensacola Ice Flyers; Indy Fuel; Rapid City Rush; Orlando Solar Bears; Allen Americans; Wheeling Nailers; Cardiff Devils; Coventry Blaze
- NHL draft: Undrafted
- Playing career: 2015–present

Taran Kozun (born August 29, 1994) is a Canadian professional ice hockey goaltender. He is currently playing with Gothiques d'Amiens in the French Ligue Magnus.

== Playing career ==
During the 2014–15 WHL season while playing with the Seattle Thunderbirds, Kozun was awarded the Del Wilson Trophy as the WHL's top goaltender and was named to the WHL Western Conference First All-Star Team.

After three seasons playing with Canadian University hockey with the Saskatchewan Huskies, claiming back-to-back U Sports Goaltender of the Year accolades, Kozun returned to the professional circuit in the ECHL, joining the Kansas City Mavericks on October 28, 2020. After 1 game stints with the Mavericks, Indy Fuel and Rapid City Rush, Kozun was traded by the Rush to join his brother, Tad, at the Orlando Solar Bears on February 10, 2021.

In July 2021, Kozun agreed terms to join the EIHL side Cardiff Devils for the 2021–22 season.

After two seasons with Cardiff, in June 2023 Kozun agreed terms to join Cardiff's league rivals Coventry Blaze for the 2023–24 season.

For the 2024–25 season, Kozun moved to French Ligue Magnus side Gothiques d'Amiens.

== Awards and honours ==
Honours	Year
WHL First Team All Star (West)	2014–15
WHL Del Wilson Trophy – Goaltender of the Year	2014–15
