= 2014–15 WHL season =

- League: Western Hockey League
- Sport: Ice hockey
- Duration: Regular season September 19, 2014 – March 22, 2015; Playoffs; March 26, 2015 – May 13, 2015
- Teams: 22
- TV partner(s): Shaw TV, Rogers Sportsnet, Root Sports Northwest

Regular season
- Scotty Munro Memorial Trophy: Brandon Wheat Kings (5)
- Season MVP: Oliver Bjorkstrand (Portland Winterhawks)
- Top scorer: Oliver Bjorkstrand (Portland Winterhawks)

Playoffs
- Playoffs MVP: Leon Draisaitl (Rockets)
- Finals champions: Kelowna Rockets (4)
- Runners-up: Brandon Wheat Kings

WHL seasons
- 2013–14 2015–16

2014–15 CHL season
- League: Canadian Hockey League
- Sport: Ice hockey
- Duration: OHL; September 2014 – March 2015; QMJHL; September 2014 – March 2015; WHL; September 19, 2014 – March 22, 2015
- Teams: 60
- TV partner(s): RDS, Rogers Sportsnet, Rogers TV, Shaw TV
- Season MVP: Connor McDavid (Erie Otters) (OHL)
- Top scorer: Dylan Strome (Erie Otters) (OHL) & Conor Garland (Moncton Wildcats) (QMJHL)

Memorial Cup
- Finals champions: Oshawa Generals (OHL) (5th title)
- Runners-up: Kelowna Rockets (WHL)

The 2014–15 WHL season was the 49th season of the Western Hockey League (WHL). The regular season began on September 19, 2014, and ended on March 22, 2015. The Brandon Wheat Kings won their fifth Scotty Munro Memorial Trophy for best regular season record. The playoffs began on March 26, 2015, and ended on May 13, 2015. The Kelowna Rockets defeated the Wheat Kings in the final to win their fourth Ed Chynoweth Cup and a berth in the 2015 Memorial Cup tournament, which was held at the Colisée Pepsi in Quebec City, Quebec. The Rockets lost the Memorial Cup final to the Oshawa Generals, 2–1 in overtime.

== Standings ==
Map of WHL, 2011–12 to 2018–19
East Division
Central Division
BC Division
US Division

East Division
Pos	Team	Pld	W	L	OTL	SOL	GF	GA	Pts
1	x, y, z – Brandon Wheat Kings	72	53	11	4	4	340	219	114
2	x – Regina Pats	72	37	24	5	6	263	238	85
3	x – Swift Current Broncos	72	34	33	1	4	221	245	73

x – clinched playoff spot; y – clinched division; z – clinched regular season title

Central Division: Top 3
Pos	Team	Pld	W	L	OTL	SOL	GF	GA	Pts
1	x, y – Calgary Hitmen	72	45	22	1	4	289	203	95
2	x – Medicine Hat Tigers	72	45	23	2	2	268	213	94
3	x – Red Deer Rebels	72	38	23	5	6	240	227	87

x – clinched playoff spot; y – clinched division

Wild Card teams: Top 2 qualify for playoffs
Pos	Div	Team	Pld	W	L	OTL	SOL	GF	GA	Pts
1	Cen.	x – Kootenay Ice	72	37	31	1	3	245	248	78
2	Cen.	x – Edmonton Oil Kings	72	34	31	4	3	217	204	75
3	East	Moose Jaw Warriors	72	32	35	4	1	221	266	69
4	East	Prince Albert Raiders	72	31	37	2	2	215	257	66
5	Cen.	Lethbridge Hurricanes	72	20	44	5	3	202	304	48
6	East	Saskatoon Blades	72	19	49	2	2	195	308	42

x – clinched playoff spot

B.C. Division
Pos	Team	Pld	W	L	OTL	SOL	GF	GA	Pts
1	x, y – Kelowna Rockets	72	53	13	5	1	305	183	112
2	x – Victoria Royals	72	39	29	3	1	244	219	82
3	x – Prince George Cougars	72	31	36	2	3	222	295	67

x – clinched playoff spot; y – clinched division

U.S. Division
Pos	Team	Pld	W	L	OTL	SOL	GF	GA	Pts
1	x, y – Everett Silvertips	72	43	20	3	6	242	199	95
2	x – Portland Winterhawks	72	43	23	2	4	287	237	92
3	x – Seattle Thunderbirds	72	38	25	4	5	218	201	85

x – clinched playoff spot; y – clinched division

Wild Card Teams: Top 2 qualify for playoffs
Pos	Div	Team	Pld	W	L	OTL	SOL	GF	GA	Pts
1	U.S.	x – Spokane Chiefs	72	34	34	3	1	219	229	72
2	U.S.	x – Tri-City Americans	72	31	38	0	3	190	242	65
3	B.C.	Kamloops Blazers	72	28	37	4	3	214	258	63
4	B.C.	Vancouver Giants	72	27	41	2	2	189	251	58

x – clinched playoff spot

== Statistical leaders ==
=== Scoring leaders ===
Players are listed by points, then goals.

Note: GP = Games played; G = Goals; A = Assists; Pts. = Points; PIM = Penalty minutes

Player	Team	GP	G	A	Pts.	PIM
Oliver Bjorkstrand	Portland Winterhawks	59	63	55	118	35
Trevor Cox	Medicine Hat Tigers	69	29	80	109	57
Tim McGauley	Brandon Wheat Kings	72	42	63	105	24
Cole Sanford	Medicine Hat Tigers	72	50	45	95	71
Cole Ully	Kamloops Blazers	69	34	60	94	32
Nick Merkley	Kelowna Rockets	72	20	70	90	79
Nic Petan	Portland Winterhawks	54	15	74	89	41
Adam Helewka	Spokane Chiefs	69	44	43	87	59
Brayden Point	Moose Jaw Warriors	60	38	49	87	46
Adam Tambellini	Calgary Hitmen	71	47	39	86	30

=== Leading goaltenders ===
These are the goaltenders that led the league in GAA that played at least 1440 minutes.

Note: GP = Games played; Mins = Minutes played; W = Wins; L = Losses; OTL = Overtime losses; SOL = Shootout losses; SO = Shutouts; GAA = Goals against average; Sv% = Save percentage

Player	Team	GP	Mins	W	L	OTL	SOL	SO	GAA	Sv%
Carter Hart	Everett Silvertips	30	1648	18	5	2	3	4	2.29	.915
Taran Kozun	Seattle Thunderbirds	60	3486	33	19	4	4	4	2.41	.915
Jackson Whistle	Kelowna Rockets	50	2962	34	10	5	0	4	2.55	.909
Mack Shields	Calgary Hitmen	49	2630	27	16	0	2	2	2.67	.900
Austin Lotz	Everett Silvertips	48	2721	25	15	1	3	4	2.73	.901

== 2015 WHL playoffs ==
Conference Quarter-finals	Conference Semi-finals
E1	Brandon	4
W2	Edmonton	1
E1	Brandon	4
E2	Regina	1
E2	Regina	4
E3	Swift Current	0
Eastern
C1	Calgary	4
W1	Kootenay	3
C1	Calgary	4
C2	Medicine Hat	1
C2	Medicine Hat	4
C3	Red Deer	1
B1	Kelowna	4
W2	Tri-City	0
B1	Kelowna	4
B2	Victoria	1
B2	Victoria	4
B3	Prince George	1
Western
U1	Everett	4
W1	Spokane	2
U1	Everett	1
U2	Portland	4
U2	Portland	4
U3	Seattle	2

Conference Finals
E1	Brandon	4
C1	Calgary	1
B1	Kelowna	4
U2	Portland	2

WHL Championship
E1	Brandon	0
B1	Kelowna	4

== Conference Quarter-finals ==
=== Eastern Conference ===
==== (E1) Brandon Wheat Kings vs. (W2) Edmonton Oil Kings ====
March 26	Brandon Wheat Kings	1 – 4	Edmonton Oil Kings	Westman Communications Group Place	Recap
No scoring		First period	0:11 - Tyler Robertson (1); 11:55 - Brett Pollock (1)
17:53 - pp - Peter Quenneville (1)		Second period	No scoring
No scoring		Third period	1:35 - pp - Brett Pollock (2); 9:07 - Lane Bauer (1)
Jordan Papirny (30 saves / 34 shots)		Goalie stats	Tristan Jarry (25 saves / 26 shots)

March 27	Brandon Wheat Kings	8 – 1	Edmonton Oil Kings	Westman Communications Group Place	Recap
0:36 - Tyler Coulter (1)		First period	No scoring
5:14 - pp - Jayce Hawryluk (1); 9:41 - Rihards Bukarts (1)		Second period	No scoring
0:16 - Jayce Hawryluk (2); 5:52 - Eric Roy (1); 10:35 - pp - Tim McGauley (1); 14:39 - pp - John Quenneville (1); 19:30 - Tim McGauley (2)		Third period	Tyler Robertson (2) - 15:05
Jordan Papirny (33 saves / 34 shots)		Goalie stats	Tristan Jarry (24 saves / 29 shots); Patrick Dea (9 saves / 12 shots)

March 29	Edmonton Oil Kings	2 – 3	Brandon Wheat Kings	Rexall Place	Recap
No scoring		First period	John Quenneville (2) - 19:33
1:54 - Davis Koch (1); 6:30 - pp - Ben Carroll (1)		Second period	No scoring
No scoring		Third period	Jayce Hawryluk (3) - 2:31; Macoy Erkamps (1) - 6:02
Tristan Jarry (26 saves / 29 shots)		Goalie stats	Jordan Papirny (41 saves / 43 shots)

March 31	Edmonton Oil Kings	2 – 3	Brandon Wheat Kings	Rexall Place	Recap
No scoring		First period	No scoring
19:03 - Andrew Koep (1)		Second period	Tyler Coulter (2) - 8:24; Rihards Bukarts (2) - pp - 13:45
19:21 - Brandon Baddock (1)		Third period	Nolan Patrick (1) - 0:36
Tristan Jarry (30 saves / 33 shots)		Goalie stats	Jordan Papirny (34 saves / 36 shots)

April 1	Edmonton Oil Kings	2 – 3	2OT	Brandon Wheat Kings	Rexall Place	Recap
No scoring		First period		Tim McGauley (3) - pp - 14:10
10:05 - Ben Carroll (2); 12:55 - pp - Brett Pollock (3)		Second period		No scoring
No scoring		Third period		Eric Roy (2) - 5:01
No scoring		Second overtime period		John Quenneville (3) - 8:58
Tristan Jarry (24 saves / 27 shots)		Goalie stats		Jordan Papirny (42 saves / 44 shots)

Brandon won series 4 – 1

* Note: Series was played in a 2-3-2 format due to the Royal Manitoba Winter Fair taking place at the Westman Communications Group Place from March 30 to April 4.

==== (E2) Regina Pats vs. (E3) Swift Current Broncos ====
March 27	Regina Pats	4 – 2	Swift Current Broncos	Brandt Centre	Recap
12:38 - Patrick D'Amico (1); 18:34 - Pavel Padakin (1); 19:33 - Pavel Padakin (2)		First period	Glenn Gawdin (1) - 2:01
No scoring		Second period	Jay Merkley - 10:53 (1)
19:42 - en - Braden Christoffer (1)		Third period	No scoring
Daniel Wapple (35 saves / 37 shots)		Goalie stats	Landon Bow (29 saves / 32 shots)

March 28	Regina Pats	3 – 2	Swift Current Broncos	Brandt Centre	Recap
8:39 - Taylor Cooper (1); 14:24 - Jesse Gabrielle (1)		First period	Brett Lernout (1) - 5:00
No scoring		Second period	Tyler Steenbergen (1) - 7:32
6:34 - Adam Brooks (1)		Third period	No scoring
Daniel Wapple (29 saves / 31 shots)		Goalie stats	Landon Bow (37 saves / 40 shots)

March 31	Swift Current Broncos	4 – 5	OT	Regina Pats	Credit Union iPlex	Recap
3:48 - Colby Cave (1)		First period		Rykr Cole (1) - 18:55
11:11 - pp - Maxime Lajoie (1); 13:43 - Coda Gordon (1)		Second period		Adam Brooks (2) - sh - 10:01; Patrick D'Amico (2) - 19:42
0:25 - Colby Cave (2)		Third period		Colby Williams (1) - 6:46
No scoring		First overtime period		Austin Wagner (1) - 4:25
Landon Bow (43 saves / 48 shots)		Goalie stats		Daniel Wapple (24 saves / 28 shots)

April 1	Swift Current Broncos	0 – 4	Regina Pats	Credit Union iPlex	Recap
No scoring		First period	No scoring
No scoring		Second period	Adam Brooks (3) - sh - 11:53; Adam Brooks (4) - 15:16; Patrick D'Amico - 16:54 (3)
No scoring		Third period	Connor Hobbs (1) - pp - 13:06
Landon Bow (37 saves / 41 shots)		Goalie stats	Daniel Wapple (24 saves / 24 shots)

Regina won series 4 – 0

==== (C1) Calgary Hitmen vs. (W1) Kootenay Ice ====
March 27	Calgary Hitmen	3 – 4	Kootenay Ice	Scotiabank Saddledome	Recap
19:44 - pp - Jake Bean (1)		First period	Luke Philp (1) - 7:14; Tyler King (1) - pp - 14:23
4:23 - Kenton Helgesen (1)		Second period	Luke Philp (2) - 17:17
13:07 - Connor Rankin (1)		Third period	Jaedon Descheneau (1) - sh - 9:57
Brendan Burke (27 saves / 31 shots)		Goalie stats	Wyatt Hoflin (29 saves / 32 shots)

March 29	Calgary Hitmen	3 – 2	OT	Kootenay Ice	Scotiabank Saddledome	Recap
No scoring		First period		No scoring
9:01 - pp - Pavel Karnaukhov (1)		Second period		Sam Reinhart (1) - pp - 17:51; Jaedon Descheneau (2) - 19:36
10:31 - pp - Pavel Karnaukhov (2)		Third period		No scoring
16:36 - Adam Tambellini (1)		First overtime period		No scoring
Brendan Burke (16 saves / 18 shots); Mack Shields (19 saves / 19 shots)		Goalie stats		Wyatt Hoflin (30 saves / 33 shots)

March 31	Kootenay Ice	7 – 8	OT	Calgary Hitmen	Western Financial Place	Recap
2:13 - Sam Reinhart (2); 7:03 - Tim Bozon (1)		First period		Chase Lang (1) - 4:45; Pavel Karnaukhov (3) - 10:57; Adam Tambellini (2) - pp - 17:18
8:58 - Sam Reinhart (3); 14:42 - Tim Bozon (2); 15:45 - Rinat Valiev (1)		Second period		Chase Lang (2) - 7:44; Travis Sanheim (1) - 13:00
2:12 - Matt Alfaro (1); 19:56 - Rinat Valiev (2)		Third period		Adam Tambellini (3) - pp - 8:50; Taylor Sanheim (1) - 13:19
No scoring		First overtime period		Adam Tambellini (4) - 1:12
Wyatt Hoflin (30 saves / 38 shots)		Goalie stats		Mack Shields (17 saves / 21 shots); Brendan Burke (8 saves / 11 shots)

April 1	Kootenay Ice	2 – 7	Calgary Hitmen	Western Financial Place	Recap
16:28 - Jaedon Descheneau (3)		First period	Connor Rankin (2) - 1:12; Travis Sanheim (2) - 10:10
No scoring		Second period	Connor Rankin (3) - 3:49; Kenton Helgesen (2) - 5:17; Connor Rankin (4) - pp - 12:56
8:39 - Tyler King (2)		Third period	Adam Tambellini (5) - en - 16:17; Kenton Helgesen (3) - 16:52
Wyatt Hoflin (33 saves / 39 shots)		Goalie stats	Brendan Burke (28 saves / 30 shots)

April 3	Calgary Hitmen	4 – 5	OT	Kootenay Ice	Scotiabank Saddledome	Recap
9:15 - Radel Fazleev (1)		First period		Rinat Valiev (3) - pp - 14:33
0:40 - pp - Radel Fazleev (2); 4:54 - Jordy Stallard (1); 12:51 - pp - Kenton Helgesen (4)		Second period		Levi Cable (1) - 1:56; Luke Philp (3) - sh - 17:48; Sam Reinhart (4) - pp - 19:51
No scoring		Third period		No scoring
No scoring		First overtime period		Luke Philp (4) - 6:05
Brendan Burke (31 saves / 36 shots)		Goalie stats		Wyatt Hoflin (24 saves / 28 shots)

April 4	Kootenay Ice	4 – 2	Calgary Hitmen	Western Financial Place	Recap
13:40 - pp - Tim Bozon (3)		First period	No scoring
14:55 - Jaedon Descheneau (4); 17:45 - Luke Philp (5)		Second period	Adam Tambellini (6) - 11:19
19:59 - pp - en - Sam Reinhart (5)		Third period	Adam Tambellini (7) - sh - 18:35
Wyatt Hoflin (25 saves / 27 shots)		Goalie stats	Brendan Burke (13 saves / 14 shots); Mack Shields (11 saves / 13 shots)

April 6	Calgary Hitmen	6 – 2	Kootenay Ice	Scotiabank Saddledome	Recap
1:12 - Connor Rankin (5); 17:34 - pp - Connor Rankin (6); 19:04 - Connor Rankin (7)		First period	No scoring
4:44 - Chase Lang (3)		Second period	Sam Reinhart (6) - 14:36
3:31 - Radel Fazleev (3); 15:12 - Kenton Helgesen (5)		Third period	Jaedon Descheneau (5) - 3:59
Mack Shields (11 saves / 13 shots)		Goalie stats	Wyatt Hoflin (29 saves / 35 shots)

Calgary won series 4 – 3

==== (C2) Medicine Hat Tigers vs (C3) Red Deer Rebels ====
March 28	Medicine Hat Tigers	2 – 1	Red Deer Rebels	Medicine Hat Arena	Recap
6:32 - Kyle Becker (1)		First period	No scoring
14:29 - pp - Cole Sanford (1)		Second period	No scoring
No scoring		Third period	Grayson Pawlenchuk (1) - 11:19
Marek Langhamer (31 saves / 32 shots)		Goalie stats	Rylan Toth (31 saves / 33 shots)

March 29	Medicine Hat Tigers	1 – 0	OT	Red Deer Rebels	Medicine Hat Arena	Recap
No scoring		First period		No scoring
No scoring		Second period		No scoring
No scoring		Third period		No scoring
10:05 - Trevor Cox (1)		First overtime period		No scoring
Marek Langhamer (27 saves / 27 shots)		Goalie stats		Rylan Toth (36 saves / 37 shots)

April 1	Red Deer Rebels	2 – 1	Medicine Hat Tigers	ENMAX Centrium	Recap
12:10 - Scott Feser (1)		First period	No scoring
No scoring		Second period	No scoring
8:34 - Wyatt Johnson (1)		Third period	Cole Sanford (2) - 11:53
Rylan Toth (34 saves / 34 shots)		Goalie stats	Marek Langhamer (29 saves / 31 shots)

April 2	Red Deer Rebels	3 – 5	Medicine Hat Tigers	ENMAX Centrium	Recap
3:37 - Haydn Fleury (1)		First period	Cole Sanford (3) - 19:40
No scoring		Second period	Trevor Cox (2) - 3:09; Steven Owre (1) - 10:34
7:58 - Conner Bleackley (1); 19:36 - sh - Wyatt Johnson (2)		Third period	Dryden Hunt (1) - 1:19; Markus Eisenschmid (1) - pp - en - 19:59
Rylan Toth (38 saves / 42 shots)		Goalie stats	Marek Langhamer (39 saves / 42 shots)

April 4	Medicine Hat Tigers	4 – 3	Red Deer Rebels	Medicine Hat Arena	Recap
6:18 - pp - Cole Sanford (4); 15:16 - Steven Owre (2)		First period	Riley Sheen (1) - pp - 10:53; Colton Bobyk (1) - 16:35
18:03 - Steven Owre (3)		Second period	Evan Polei (1) - pp - 3:29
18:14 - Trevor Cox (3)		Third period	No scoring
Marek Langhamer (28 saves / 31 shots)		Goalie stats	Rylan Toth (32 saves / 36 shots)

Medicine Hat won series 4 – 1

=== Western Conference ===
==== (B1) Kelowna Rockets vs. (W2) Tri-City Americans ====
March 27	Kelowna Rockets	6 – 0	Tri-City Americans	Prospera Place	Recap
2:06 - Rourke Chartier (1)		First period	No scoring
13:20 - sh - Nick Merkley (1); 16:55 - Dillon Dubé (1); 19:22 - Leon Draisaitl (1)		Second period	No scoring
6:51 - sh - Rourke Chartier (2); 8:40 - Madison Bowey (1)		Third period	No scoring
Jackson Whistle (18 saves / 18 shots)		Goalie stats	Eric Comrie (24 saves / 30 shots)

March 28	Kelowna Rockets	3 – 0	Tri-City Americans	Prospera Place	Recap
7:42 - Rodney Southam (1)		First period	No scoring
No scoring		Second period	No scoring
15:54 - Leon Draisaitl (2); 18:36 - en - Tyson Baillie (1)		Third period	No scoring
Jackson Whistle (30 saves / 30 shots)		Goalie stats	Eric Comrie (42 saves / 44 shots)

March 31	Tri-City Americans	3 – 5	Kelowna Rockets	Toyota Center	Recap
No scoring		First period	Riley Stadel (1) - 15:37
14:14 - pp - Beau McCue (1)		Second period	Tomáš Šoustal (1) - 8:49; Cole Linaker (1) - pp - 15:35
3:57 - Jordan Topping (1); 18:06 - Beau McCue (2)		Third period	Tyson Baillie (2) - pp - 9:31; Chance Braid (1) - 16:02
Eric Comrie (20 saves / 25 shots)		Goalie stats	Jackson Whistle (19 saves / 22 shots)

April 1	Tri-City Americans	4 – 5	OT	Kelowna Rockets	Toyota Center	Recap
11:28 - Dylan Coghlan (1); 18:12 - Tyler Sandhu (1)		First period		No scoring
14:06 - Richard Nejezchleb (1); 17:57 - sh - Beau McCue (3)		Second period		Rourke Chartier (3) - 0:30; Madison Bowey (2) - pp - 18:13; Rourke Charier (4) - 18:49
No scoring		Third period		Madison Bowey (3) - 0:37
No scoring		First overtime period		Gage Quinney (1) - 18:32
Eric Comrie (66 saves / 71 shots)		Goalie stats		Jackson Whistle (15 saves / 19 shots); Michael Herringer (11 saves / 11 shots)

Kelowna won series 4 – 0

==== (B2) Victoria Royals vs. (B3) Prince George Cougars ====
March 27	Victoria Royals	5 – 3	Prince George Cougars	Save-On-Foods Memorial Centre	Recap
No scoring		First period	Tate Olson (1) - pp - 6:08; Chase Witala (1) - pp - 7:06
4:59 - Brandon Magee (1); 5:59 - Brandon Magee (2); 12:20 - Greg Chase (1); 18:44 - Brandon Magee (3)		Second period	No scoring
19:27 - en - Taylor Crunk (1)		Third period	Kody McDonald (1) - pp - 6:32
Coleman Vollrath (28 saves / 31 shots)		Goalie stats	Ty Edmonds (20 saves / 24 shots)

March 28	Victoria Royals	5 – 4	Prince George Cougars	Save-On-Foods Memorial Centre	Recap
13:57 - Jack Walker (1)		First period	No scoring
3:20 - Tyler Soy (1); 15:11 - Greg Chase (2)		Second period	Tate Olson (2) - pp - 5:50; Zach Pochiro (1) - 18:28
11:51 - Brandon Magee (4); 15:45 - Brandon Magee (5)		Third period	Tate Olson (3) - pp - 5:02; Chase Witala (2) - 13:49
Coleman Vollrath (30 saves / 34 shots)		Goalie stats	Ty Edmonds (20 saves / 25 shots)

April 1	Prince George Cougars	4 – 2	Victoria Royals	CN Centre	Recap
13:23 - sh - Chase Witala (3)		First period	No scoring
2:22 - pp - Jari Erricson (1); 7:58 - Sam Ruopp (1)		Second period	Tyler Soy (2) - pp - 13:22; Logan Fisher (1) - 14:06
6:06 - Brad Morrison (1)		Third period	No scoring
Ty Edmonds (22 saves / 24 shots)		Goalie stats	Coleman Vollrath (38 saves / 42 shots)

April 2	Prince George Cougars	0 – 3	Victoria Royals	CN Centre	Recap
No scoring		First period	No scoring
No scoring		Second period	Travis Brown (1) - 4:40
No scoring		Third period	Regan Nagy (1) - sh - 0:46; Alex Forsberg (1) - pp - 14:53
Ty Edmonds (21 saves / 24 shots)		Goalie stats	Coleman Vollrath (24 saves / 24 shots)

April 4	Victoria Royals	5 – 4	OT	Prince George Cougars	Save-On-Foods Memorial Centre	Recap
9:04 - pp - Greg Chase (3); 13:41 - Brandon Fushimi (1); 17:04 - Greg Chase (4)		First period		Zach Pochiro (2) - 9:54
No scoring		Second period		Zach Pochiro (3) - pp - 15:14
15:16 - Greg Chase (5)		Third period		Zach Pochiro (4) - 14:00; Brad Morrison (2) - pp - 18:46
1:42 - Brandon Magee (6)		First overtime period		No scoring
Coleman Vollrath (34 saves / 38 shots)		Goalie stats		Ty Edmonds (22 saves / 27 shots)

Victoria won series 4 – 1

==== (U1) Everett Silvertips vs. (W1) Spokane Chiefs ====
March 27	Everett Silvertips	5 – 1	Spokane Chiefs	Xfinity Arena	Recap
No scoring		First period	No scoring
No scoring		Second period	Ryan Hofer (1) - 13:55
0:17 - Carson Stadnyk (1); 1:34 - Carson Stadnyk (2); 4:03 - Carson Stadnyk (3); 11:31 - pp - Ivan Nikolishin (1); 18:56 - pp - Ivan Nikolishin (2)		Third period	No scoring
Carter Hart (22 saves / 23 shots)		Goalie stats	Garret Hughson (27 saves / 32 shots)

March 28	Everett Silvertips	2 – 6	Spokane Chiefs	Xfinity Arena	Recap
No scoring		First period	Jackson Playfair (1) - 7:15; Dominic Zwerger (1) - pp - 9:33; Adam Helewka (1) - 11:08; Adam Helewka (2) - pp - 13:01
No scoring		Second period	No scoring
14:21 - Cole MacDonald (1); 15:40 - pp - Matt Fonteyne (1)		Third period	Dominic Zwerger (2) - 3:20; Jason Fram (1) - pp - 11:06
Carter Hart (5 saves / 8 shots); Austin Lotz (26 saves / 29 shots)		Goalie stats	Garret Hughson (29 saves / 31 shots)

April 1	Spokane Chiefs	1 – 2	2OT	Everett Silvertips	Spokane Veterans Memorial Arena	Recap
14:19 - Adam Helewka (3)		First period		No scoring
No scoring		Second period		No scoring
No scoring		Third period		Brayden Low (1) - 0:52
No scoring		Second overtime period		Jake Mykitiuk (1) - 2:07
Garret Hughson (36 saves / 38 shots)		Goalie stats		Carter Hart (45 saves / 46 shots)

April 3	Spokane Chiefs	1 – 3	Everett Silvertips	Spokane Veterans Memorial Arena	Recap
No scoring		First period	No scoring
No scoring		Second period	Logan Aasman (1) - 2:21; Nikita Scherbak (1) - 11:54
10:53 - pp - Kailer Yamamoto (1)		Third period	Brayden Low (2) - 6:48
Garret Hughson (19 saves / 22 shots)		Goalie stats	Carter Hart (34 saves / 35 shots)

April 4	Everett Silvertips	3 – 4	OT	Spokane Chiefs	Xfinity Arena	Recap
No scoring		First period		Markson Bechtold (1) - 12:19
2:59 - pp - Carson Stadnyk (4); 10:17 - Brayden Low (3); 12:44 - Kohl Bauml (1)		Second period		Ryan Hofer (2) - 11:14
No scoring		Third period		Nick Charif (1) - 17:42
No scoring		First overtime period		Riley Whittingham (1) - 15:25
Carter Hart (39 saves / 43 shots)		Goalie stats		Garret Hughson (36 saves / 39 shots)

April 7	Spokane Chiefs	1 – 2	3OT	Everett Silvertips	Spokane Veterans Memorial Arena	Recap
No scoring		First period		Kohl Bauml (2) - pp - 10:11
No scoring		Second period		No scoring
Kailer Yamamoto (2) - 19:55		Third period		No scoring
No scoring		Third overtime period		Brayden Low (4) - 3:43
Garret Hughson (39 saves / 41 shots)		Goalie stats		Carter Hart (53 saves / 54 shots)

Everett wins series 4 – 2

==== (U2) Portland Winterhawks vs. (U3) Seattle Thunderbirds ====
March 28	Portland Winterhawks	3 – 4	Seattle Thunderbirds	Veterans Memorial Coliseum	Recap
19:55 - Blake Heinrich (1)		First period	Mathew Barzal (1) - 1:01; Cory Millette (1) - pp - 15:43
8:37 - pp - Adam Henry (1)		Second period	No scoring
6:27 - Evan Weinger (1)		Third period	Scott Eansor (1) - 11:41; Mathew Barzal (2) - 17:18
Adin Hill (29 saves / 33 shots)		Goalie stats	Taran Kozun (34 saves / 37 shots)

March 29	Portland Winterhawks	3 – 0	Seattle Thunderbirds	Moda Center	Recap
14:23 - Nic Petan (1)		First period	No scoring
No scoring		Second period	No scoring
18:02 - en - Dominic Turgeon (1); 18:14 - en - Oliver Bjorkstrand (1)		Third period	No scoring
Adin Hill (21 saves / 21 shots)		Goalie stats	Taran Kozun (36 saves / 37 shots)

March 31	Seattle Thunderbirds	5 – 2	Portland Winterhawks	ShoWare Center	Recap
3:28 - Scott Eansor (2); 8:48 - Roberts Lipsbergs (1)		First period	No scoring
4:12 - pp - Alexander True (1)		Second period	Dominic Turgeon (2) - 1:37
4:06 - Jerret Smith (1); 18:34 - en - Jerret Smith (2)		Third period	Nic Petan (2) - 16:15
Taran Kozun (35 saves / 37 shots)		Goalie stats	Adin Hill (24 saves / 28 shots)

April 2	Seattle Thunderbirds	5 – 8	Portland Winterhawks	ShoWare Center	Recap
17:43 - Ryan Gropp (1)		First period	Chase De Leo (1) - 0:54; Alex Overhardt (1) - 2:15
No scoring		Second period	Adam Henry (2) - 8:41; Nic Petan (3) - pp - 10:06; Keegan Iverson (1) - 15:03
1:17 - Mathew Barzal (3); 10:47 - pp - Alexander True (2); 14:59 - Ethan Bear (1); 17:10 - pp - Shea Theodore (1)		Third period	Dominic Turgeon (3) - 4:02; Oliver Bjorkstrand (2) - pp - 12:30; Nic Petan (4) - en - 19:09
Taran Kozun (17 saves / 22 shots); Logan Flodell (19 saves / 21 shots)		Goalie stats	Adin Hill (34 saves / 39 shots)

April 4	Portland Winterhawks	5 – 3	Seattle Thunderbirds	Veterans Memorial Coliseum	Recap
7:56 - Keegan Iverson (2); 17:08 - Paul Bittner (1)		First period	Scott Eansor (3) - sh - 19:49
No scoring		Second period	No scoring
4:54 - pp - Paul Bittner (2); 11:41 - Alex Schoenborn (1); 19:24 - en - Oliver Bjorkstrand (3)		Third period	Shea Theodore (2) - pp - 7:54; Mathew Barzal (4) - 12:38
Adin Hill (27 saves / 30 shots)		Goalie stats	Taran Kozun (30 saves / 34 shots)

April 7	Seattle Thunderbirds	4 – 5	OT	Portland Winterhawks	ShoWare Center	Recap
14:48 - Scott Eansor (4)		First period		Oliver Bjorkstrand (4) - 8:53
6:37 - Shea Theodore (3); 11:37 - pp - Cory Millette (2)		Second period		Dominic Turgeon (4) - 2:17; Oliver Bjorkstrand (5) - 3:23
18:20 - Scott Eansor (5)		Third period		Miles Koules (1) - 11:25
No scoring		First overtime period		Nic Petan (5) - 19:01
Taran Kozun (36 saves / 41 shots)		Goalie stats		Adin Hill (46 saves / 50 shots)

Portland won series 4 – 2

== Conference Semi-finals ==
=== Eastern Conference ===
==== (E1) Brandon Wheat Kings vs. (E2) Regina Pats ====
April 10	Brandon Wheat Kings	5 – 1	Regina Pats	Westman Communications Group Place	Recap
9:48 - Duncan Campbell (1)		First period	No scoring
1:56 - Tim McGauley (4); 13:50 - John Quenneville (4)		Second period	Taylor Cooper (2) - 9:12
10:41 - Ivan Provorov (1); 14:04 - Jayce Hawryluk (4)		Third period	No scoring
Jordan Papirny (21 saves / 22 shots)		Goalie stats	Daniel Wapple (26 saves / 31 shots)

April 11	Brandon Wheat Kings	5 – 2	Regina Pats	Westman Communications Group Place	Recap
4:00 - sh - Tyler Coulter (3); 13:01 - pp - Jayce Hawryluk (5)		First period	No scoring
12:19 - pp - Ivan Provorov (2); 19:57 - Macoy Erkamps (2)		Second period	Colby Williams (2) - pp - 9:31; Pavel Padakin (3) - pp - 16:24
10:56 - pp - Kale Clague (1)		Third period	No scoring
Jordan Papirny (35 saves / 37 shots)		Goalie stats	Daniel Wapple (36 saves / 41 shots)

April 14	Regina Pats	3 – 2	Brandon Wheat Kings	Brandt Centre	Recap
4:45 - Jared McAmmond (1)		First period	Stelio Mattheos (1) - 15:48
1:53 - Braden Christoffer (2); 5:08 - Taylor Cooper (3)		Second period	Peter Quenneville (2) - pp - 18:32
No scoring		Third period	No scoring
Daniel Wapple (39 saves / 41 shots)		Goalie stats	Jordan Papirny (28 saves / 31 shots)

April 15	Regina Pats	2 – 3	OT	Brandon Wheat Kings	Brandt Centre	Recap
No scoring		First period		Nolan Patrick (2) - 19:37
4:27 - Colby Williams (3); 6:27 - pp - Connor Hobbs (2)		Second period		No scoring
No scoring		Third period		Peter Quenneville (3) - pp - 7:53
No scoring		First overtime period		Tanner Kaspick (1) - 3:36
Daniel Wapple (45 saves / 48 shots)		Goalie stats		Jordan Papirny (30 saves / 32 shots)

April 17	Brandon Wheat Kings	3 – 2	OT	Regina Pats	Westman Communications Group Place	Recap
12:52 - sh - Nolan Patrick (3)		First period		No scoring
No scoring		Second period		Jake Leschyshyn (1) - 13:41; Taylor Cooper (4) - 18:58
13:39 - Nolan Patrick (4)		Third period		No scoring
6:15 - Peter Quenneville (4)		First overtime period		No scoring
Jordan Papirny (25 saves / 27 shots)		Goalie stats		Daniel Wapple (48 saves / 51 shots)

Brandon won series 4 – 1

==== (C1) Calgary Hitmen vs. (C2) Medicine Hat Tigers ====
April 10	Medicine Hat Tigers	1 – 3	Calgary Hitmen	Medicine Hat Arena	Recap
Dryden Hunt (2) - 19:50		First period	7:57 - Connor Rankin (8); 16:30 - Jake Virtanen (1)
No scoring		Second period	No scoring
No scoring		Third period	6:30 - Chase Lang (4)
Marek Langhamer (11 saves / 14 shots)		Goalie stats	Mack Shields (33 saves / 34 shots)

April 12	Calgary Hitmen	2 – 3	OT	Medicine Hat Tigers	Scotiabank Saddledome	Recap
No scoring		First period		No scoring
14:57 - Travis Sanheim (3)		Second period		Steven Owre (4) - pp - 19:29
7:06 - Jordy Stallard (2)		Third period		Dryden Hunt (3) - 3:55
No scoring		First overtime period		Matt Staples (1) - 17:35
Mack Shields (47 saves / 50 shots)		Goalie stats		Marek Langhamer (39 saves / 41 shots)

April 13	Calgary Hitmen	5 – 4	Medicine Hat Tigers	Scotiabank Saddledome	Recap
Adam Tambellini (8) - 6:20; Kenton Helgesen (6) - pp - 10:36; Connor Rankin (9) - pp - 13:28		First period	1:34 - Chad Labelle (1); 2:33 - Steven Owre (5)
Travis Sanheim (4) - pp - 2:14; Adam Tambellini (9) - 5:17		Second period	No scoring
No scoring		Third period	3:09 - Chad Labelle (2); 6:04 - Dryden Hunt (4)
Mack Shields (29 saves / 33 shots)		Goalie stats	Marek Langhamer (26 saves / 31 shots)

April 15	Medicine Hat Tigers	1 – 2	OT	Calgary Hitmen	Medicine Hat Arena	Recap
19:41 - pp - Tyler Lewington (1)		First period		No scoring
No scoring		Second period		Jake Virtanen (2) - ps - 6:24
No scoring		Third period		No scoring
No scoring		First overtime period		Jordy Stallard (3) - 7:22
Marek Langhamer (20 saves / 22 shots)		Goalie stats		Mack Shields (35 saves / 36 shots)

April 17	Calgary Hitmen	4 – 3	2OT	Medicine Hat Tigers	Scotiabank Saddledome	Recap
15:03 - Jake Virtanen (3)		First period		3:22 - Cole Sanford (5)
17:31 - Jake Bean (2)		Second period		Dryden Hunt (5) - 0:59
19:15 - pp - Jake Virtanen (4)		Third period		Markus Eisenschmid (2) - 12:03
7:45 - Travis Sanheim (5)		Second overtime period		No scoring
Mack Shields (52 saves / 55 shots)		Goalie stats		Marek Langhamer (54 saves / 58 shots)

Calgary won series 4 – 1

* Note: Game 1 was held at the Medicine Hat Arena due to scheduling conflicts with a Calgary Roughnecks home game and an Eric Church concert at the Scotiabank Saddledome.

=== Western Conference ===
==== (B1) Kelowna Rockets vs. (B2) Victoria Royals ====
April 10	Kelowna Rockets	5 – 0	Victoria Royals	Prospera Place	Recap
No scoring		First period	No scoring
5:40 - Tyson Baillie (3); 19:37 - Cole Martin (1)		Second period	No scoring
7:59 - Gage Quinney (2); 10:36 - pp - Rourke Chartier (5); 19:27 - pp - Tomáš Šoustal (2)		Third period	No scoring
Jackson Whistle (20 saves / 20 shots)		Goalie stats	Coleman Vollrath (39 saves / 44 shots)

April 11	Kelowna Rockets	4 – 3	OT	Victoria Royals	Prospera Place	Recap
18:44 - pp - Tyson Baillie (4)		First period		No scoring
4:11 - Tomáš Šoustal (3); 11:16 - pp - Gage Quinney (3)		Second period		Brandon Magee (7) - pp - 18:02
No scoring		Third period		Alex Forsberg (2) - pp - 7:31; Brandon Magee (8) - 18:26
0:58 - Tyson Baillie (5)		First overtime period		No scoring
Jackson Whistle (38 saves / 41 shots)		Goalie stats		Coleman Vollrath (12 saves / 15 shots); Justin Paulic (11 saves / 12 shots)

April 14	Victoria Royals	2 – 4	Kelowna Rockets	Save-On-Foods Memorial Centre	Recap
1:03 - Alex Forsberg (3)		First period	Leon Draisaitl (3) - sh - 8:18; Nick Merkley (2) - pp - 14:10
0:54 - Greg Chase (6)		Second period	Gage Quinney (4) - 9:02; Madison Bowey (4) - pp - 15:16
No scoring		Third period	No scoring
Coleman Vollrath (24 saves / 28 shots); Justin Paulic (8 saves / 8 shots)		Goalie stats	Jackson Whistle (28 saves / 30 shots)

April 15	Victoria Royals	5 – 4	OT	Kelowna Rockets	Save-On-Foods Memorial Centre	Recap
17:47 - Austin Carrol (1)		First period		Lucas Johansen (1) - 5:15; Tyson Baillie (6) - 17:34; Rourke Chartier (6) - 18:09
11:01 - Jack Walker (2)		Second period		Tomáš Šoustal (4) - 18:28
10:42 - Jack Walker (3); 11:06 - Brandon Magee (9)		Third period		No scoring
5:30 - Greg Chase (7)		First overtime period		No scoring
Justin Paulic (36 saves / 40 shots)		Goalie stats		Jackson Whistle (27 saves / 32 shots)

April 17	Kelowna Rockets	7 – 3	Victoria Royals	Prospera Place	Recap
1:24 - Leon Draisaitl (4); 19:26 - Josh Morrissey (1)		First period	Jack Walker (4) - 17:54; Brandon Fushimi (2) - 18:17
2:18 - Rodney Southam (2); 14:52 - pp - Tyson Baillie (7); 16:53 - pp - Josh Morrissey (2)		Second period	No scoring
7:35 - Rourke Chartier (7); 13:11 - Cole Linaker (2)		Third period	Travis Brown (2) - pp - 13:59
Jackson Whistle (7 saves / 9 shots); Michael Herringer (11 saves / 12 shots)		Goalie stats	Justin Paulic (21 saves / 26 shots); Coleman Vollrath (11 saves / 13 shots)

Kelowna won series 4 – 1

==== (U1) Everett Silvertips vs. (U2) Portland Winterhawks ====
April 10	Everett Silvertips	5 – 3	Portland Winterhawks	Xfinity Arena	Recap
5:25 - Kohl Bauml (3); 8:29 - Remi Laurencelle (1)		First period	No scoring
4:42 - Remi Laurencelle (2); 19:57 - Jake Mykitiuk (2)		Second period	Miles Koules (2) - 19:43
7:58 - pp - Patrick Bajkov (1)		Third period	Dominic Turgeon (5) - 11:05; Alex Schoenborn (2) - 16:22
Carter Hart (27 saves / 30 shots)		Goalie stats	Adin Hill (16 saves / 21 shots)

April 11	Everett Silvertips	3 – 4	2OT	Portland Winterhawks	Xfinity Arena	Recap
3:12 - Jake Mykitiuk (3)		First period		Blake Heinrich (2) - 12:48; Chase De Leo (2) - pp - 15:29
12:49 - Nikita Scherbak (2); 19:25 - Nikita Scherbak (3)		Second period		No scoring
No scoring		Third period		Adam Henry (3) - 10:18
No scoring		Second overtime period		Oliver Bjorkstrand (5) - 0:29
Carter Hart (41 saves / 45 shots)		Goalie stats		Adin Hill (41 saves / 44 shots)

April 16	Portland Winterhawks	5 – 3	Everett Silvertips	Veterans Memorial Coliseum	Recap
No scoring		First period	No scoring
17:52 - Anton Cederholm (1); 18:13 - pp - Nic Petan (6)		Second period	No scoring
3:22 - Oliver Bjorkstrand (7); 5:09 - pp - Oliver Bjorkstrand (8); 14:27 - Dominic Turgeon (6)		Third period	Kevin Davis (1) - 16:05; Ivan Nikolishin (3) - 17:37; Graham Millar (1) - 17:51
Adin Hill (16 saves / 19 shots)		Goalie stats	Carter Hart (30 saves / 34 shots); Austin Lotz (1 save / 2 shots)

April 17	Portland Winterhawks	2 – 1	OT	Everett Silvertips	Veterans Memorial Coliseum	Recap
No scoring		First period		No scoring
1:15 - Chase De Leo (3)		Second period		Ben Betker (1) - 12:55
No scoring		Third period		No scoring
5:40 - Blake Heinrich (3)		First overtime period		No scoring
Adin Hill (29 saves / 30 shots)		Goalie stats		Carter Hart (29 saves / 31 shots)

April 19	Everett Silvertips	2 – 3	Portland Winterhawks	Xfinity Arena	Recap
12:10 - Jordan Wharrie (1)		First period	Nic Petan (7) - pp - 6:43
18:53 - Cole MacDonald (2)		Second period	Oliver Bjorkstrand (9) - 3:19; Oliver Bjorkstrand (10) - 8:40
No scoring		Third period	No scoring
Carter Hart (28 saves / 31 shots)		Goalie stats	Adin Hill (31 shots / 33 shots)

Portland won series 4 – 1

== Conference Finals ==
=== Eastern Conference ===
==== (E1) Brandon Wheat Kings vs. (C1) Calgary Hitmen ====
April 24	Brandon Wheat Kings	9 – 4	Calgary Hitmen	Westman Communications Group Place	Recap
5:04 - Jayce Hawryluk (6); 7:39 - pp - John Quenneville (5)		First period	Pavel Karnaukhov (4) - 17:34
9:02 - pp - Peter Quenneville (3); 12:17 - Braylon Shmyr (1); 12:39 - Nolan Patrick (5); 18:53 - pp - John Quenneville (6)		Second period	Beck Malenstyn (1) - 5:26; Jake Virtanen (5) - pp - 18:21
0:17 - Braylon Shmyr (2); 4:08 - Morgan Klimchuk (1); 16:56 - Tim McGauley (5)		Third period	Carsen Twarynski (1) - 17:04
Jordan Papirny (34 saves / 38 shots)		Goalie stats	Mack Shields (15 saves / 19 shots); Brendan Burke (17 saves / 22 shots)

April 25	Brandon Wheat Kings	3 – 2	OT	Calgary Hitmen	Westman Communications Group Place	Recap
3:49 - Jayce Hawryluk (7); 11:03 - pp - Peter Quenneville (6)		First period		Adam Tambellini (10) - 16:48
No scoring		Second period		No scoring
No scoring		Third period		Micheal Zipp (1) - 6:51
0:51 - Tyler Coulter (4)		First overtime period		No scoring
Jordan Papirny (22 saves / 24 shots)		Goalie stats		Brendan Burke (43 saves / 46 shots)

April 28	Calgary Hitmen	2 – 1	OT	Brandon Wheat Kings	Scotiabank Saddledome	Recap
No scoring		First period		No scoring
No scoring		Second period		John Quenneville (7) - 4:23
10:41 - pp - Adam Tambellini (11)		Third period		No scoring
3:07 - Adam Tambellini (12)		First overtime period		No scoring
Brendan Burke (33 saves / 34 shots)		Goalie stats		Jordan Papirny (30 saves / 32 shots)

April 29	Calgary Hitmen	3 – 8	Brandon Wheat Kings	Scotiabank Saddledome	Recap
13:46 - Layne Bensmiller (1)		First period	John Quenneville (8) - 19:00
15:58 - Pavel Karnaukhov (5)		Second period	Jayce Hawryluk (8) - pp - 6:03; Braylon Shmyr (3) - 10:38; Morgan Klimchuk (2) - 14:15; Nolan Patrick (6) - 15:13; Tyler Coulter (5) - 16:28
1:51 - pp - Radel Fazleev (4)		Third period	Peter Quenneville (7) - 10:27; Colton Waltz (1) - sh - en - 12:49
Brendan Burke (10 saves / 14 shots); Mack Shields (12 saves / 15 shots)		Goalie stats	Jordan Papirny (28 saves / 31 shots)

May 1	Brandon Wheat Kings	8 – 2	Calgary Hitmen	Westman Communications Group Place	Recap
No scoring		First period	Pavel Karnaukhov (6) - pp - 17:22
8:35 - Eric Roy (3); 9:41 - Ryan Pilon (1); 9:51 - Nolan Patrick (7); 12:58 - pp - Jayce Hawryluk (9); 15:23 - pp - John Quenneville (9)		Second period	Adam Tambellini (13) - 16:25
4:23 - Jayce Hawryluk (10); 15:24 - sh - en - Tim McGauley (6); 15:55 - John Quenneville (10)		Third period	No scoring
Jordan Papirny (31 saves / 33 shots)		Goalie stats	Mack Shields (15 saves / 18 shots); Brendan Burke (11 saves / 15 shots)

Brandon won series 4 – 1

=== Western Conference ===
==== (B1) Kelowna Rockets vs. (U2) Portland Winterhawks ====
April 24	Kelowna Rockets	3 – 2	Portland Winterhawks	Prospera Place	Recap
No scoring		First period	0:35 - Oliver Bjorkstrand (11); 18:00 - Adam Henry (4)
1:38 - sh - Madison Bowey (5); 2:24 - Justin Kirkland (1); 15:56 - Rourke Chartier (8)		Second period	No scoring
No scoring		Third period	No scoring
Jackson Whistle (30 saves / 32 shots)		Goalie stats	Adin Hill (43 saves / 46 shots)

April 25	Kelowna Rockets	2 – 3	Portland Winterhawks	Prospera Place	Recap
No scoring		First period	Paul Bittner (3) - pp - 16:33
13:29 - pp - Rourke Chartier (9); 15:51 - pp - Dillon Dubé (2)		Second period	Dominic Turgeon (7) - 11:46; Nic Petan (8) - 19:12
No scoring		Third period	No scoring
Jackson Whistle (29 saves / 32 shots)		Goalie stats	Adin Hill (38 saves / 40 shots)

April 28	Portland Winterhawks	7 – 3	Kelowna Rockets	Moda Center	Recap
12:50 - pp - Dominic Turgeon (8)		First period	No scoring
1:33 - Keoni Texeira (1); 3:13 - pp - Chase De Leo (4); 13:51 - Alex Schoenborn (3)		Second period	Leon Draisaitl (5) - 10:46
1:26 - pp - Oliver Bjorkstrand (12); 12:57 - pp - Paul Bittner (4)		Third period	Cole Linaker (3) - pp - 4:21; Riley Stadel (2) - 15:37
Adin Hill (41 saves / 44 shots)		Goalie stats	Jackson Whistle (14 saves / 18 shots); Michael Herringer (19 saves / 22 shots)

April 29	Portland Winterhawks	2 – 3	Kelowna Rockets	Moda Center	Recap
1:12 - Chase De Leo (5)		First period	Leon Draisaitl (6) - 7:50
12:03 - Nic Petan (9)		Second period	Chance Braid (2) - 2:40; Tyrell Goulbourne (1) - pp - 9:16
No scoring		Third period	No scoring
Adin Hill (25 saves / 28 shots)		Goalie stats	Jackson Whistle (40 saves / 42 shots)

May 1	Kelowna Rockets	2 – 1	OT	Portland Winterhawks	Prospera Place	Recap
17:35 - Riley Stadel (3)		First period		No scoring
No scoring		Second period		No scoring
No scoring		Third period		Nic Petan (10) - 16:27
14:55 - Tyson Baillie (8)		First overtime period		No scoring
Jackson Whistle (42 saves / 43 shots)		Goalie stats		Adin Hill (47 saves / 49 shots)

May 3	Portland Winterhawks	4 – 8	Kelowna Rockets	Moda Center	Recap
6:16 - Chase De Leo (6); 9:06 - Adam Henry (5); 13:30 - Chase De Leo (7)		First period	Madison Bowey (6) - 14:45
No scoring		Second period	Dillon Dubé (3) - 4:12; Madison Bowey (7) - sh - 12:18
8:12 - Keoni Texeira (2)		Third period	Tyson Baillie (9) - 6:58; Justin Kirkland (2) - 10:35; Cole Linaker (4) - 12:18; Dillon Dubé (4) - en - 18:28; Chance Braid (3) - en - 18:50
Adin Hill (33 shots / 39 saves)		Goalie stats	Jackson Whistle (5 saves / 8 shots); Michael Herringer (30 saves / 31 shots)

Kelowna won series 4 – 2

== WHL Championship ==
=== (E1) Brandon Wheat Kings vs. (B1) Kelowna Rockets ===
May 8	Brandon Wheat Kings	3 – 4	Kelowna Rockets	Westman Communications Group Place	Recap
4:58 - pp - Rihards Bukarts (3)		First period	Tyson Baillie (10) - pp - 17:41
15:58 - pp - Peter Quenneville (8); 17:55 - Rihards Bukarts (4)		Second period	Justin Kirkland (3) - 0:52; Chance Braid (4) - 1:19; Leon Draisaitl (7) - 18:50
No scoring		Third period	No scoring
Jordan Papirny (36 saves / 40 shots)		Goalie stats	Jackson Whistle (25 saves / 28 shots)

May 9	Brandon Wheat Kings	3 – 5	Kelowna Rockets	Westman Communications Group Place	Recap
1:20 - Tim McGauley (7)		First period	Rourke Chartier (10) - 11:33; Nick Merkley (3) - 19:57
No scoring		Second period	Gage Quinney (5) - 0:27
2:49 - Peter Quenneville (9); 6:37 - pp - Peter Quenneville (10)		Third period	Nick Merkley (4) - sh - 10:16; Leon Draisaitl (8) - en - 19:39
Jordan Papirny (26 saves / 30 shots)		Goalie stats	Jackson Whistle (38 saves / 41 shots)

May 11	Kelowna Rockets	5 – 3	Brandon Wheat Kings	Prospera Place	Recap
6:35 - sh - Leon Draisaitl (9); 8:47 - Gage Quinney (6)		First period	Morgan Klimchuk (3) - pp - 7:48
4:15 - Dillon Dubé (5); 15:02 - Rourke Chartier (11)		Second period	Nolan Patrick (8) - 15:28
13:48 - Rourke Chartier (12)		Third period	Tim McGauley (8) - 10:06
Jackson Whistle (26 saves / 29 shots)		Goalie stats	Jordan Papirny (27 saves / 32 shots)

May 13	Kelowna Rockets	3 – 0	Brandon Wheat Kings	Prospera Place	Recap
No scoring		First period	No scoring
No scoring		Second period	No scoring
1:10 - sh - Leon Draisaitl (10); 1:29 - sh - Rourke Chartier (13); 14:30 - Nick Merkley (5)		Third period	No scoring
Jackson Whistle (19 saves / 19 shots)		Goalie stats	Jordan Papirny (27 saves / 30 shots)

Kelowna won series 4 – 0

== Playoff scoring leaders ==
Note: GP = Games played; G = Goals; A = Assists; Pts = Points; PIM = Penalty minutes

Player	Team	GP	G	A	Pts	PIM
Nic Petan	Portland Winterhawks	17	10	18	28	20
Leon Draisaitl	Kelowna Rockets	19	10	18	28	12
Nick Merkley	Kelowna Rockets	19	5	22	27	18
Adam Tambellini	Calgary Hitmen	16	13	13	26	10
Oliver Bjorkstrand	Portland Winterhawks	17	13	12	25	10
Tyson Baillie	Kelowna Rockets	19	10	14	24	24
Rourke Chartier	Kelowna Rockets	16	13	7	20	2
Peter Quenneville	Brandon Wheat Kings	19	10	10	20	4
Jayce Hawryluk	Brandon Wheat Kings	16	10	9	19	24
John Quenneville	Brandon Wheat Kings	19	10	9	19	18

== Playoff leading goaltenders ==
Note: GP = Games played; Mins = Minutes played; W = Wins; L = Losses; GA = Goals Allowed; SO = Shutouts; SV& = Save percentage; GAA = Goals against average

Player	Team	GP	Mins	W	L	GA	SO	Sv%	GAA
Michael Herringer	Kelowna Rockets	4	153	3	0	5	0	.934	1.96
Carter Hart	Everett Silvertips	11	710	5	6	27	0	.929	2.28
Marek Langhamer	Medicine Hat Tigers	10	657	5	5	25	1	.924	2.28
Garret Hughson	Spokane Chiefs	6	438	2	4	17	0	.916	2.33
Rylan Toth	Red Deer Rebels	5	308	1	4	12	0	.934	2.34

== WHL awards ==
Scotty Munro Memorial Trophy	Regular season champions	Brandon Wheat Kings	
Four Broncos Memorial Trophy	Player of the Year	Oliver Bjorkstrand	Portland Winterhawks
Bob Clarke Trophy	Top Scorer	Oliver Bjorkstrand	Portland Winterhawks
Bill Hunter Memorial Trophy	Top Defenseman	Shea Theodore	Seattle Thunderbirds
Jim Piggott Memorial Trophy	Rookie of the year	Nolan Patrick	Brandon Wheat Kings
Del Wilson Trophy	Top Goaltender	Taran Kozun	Seattle Thunderbirds
WHL Plus-Minus Award	Top Plus-Minus Rating	Oliver Bjorkstrand	Portland Winterhawks
Brad Hornung Trophy	Most Sportsmanlike Player	Rourke Chartier	Kelowna Rockets
Daryl K. (Doc) Seaman Trophy	Scholastic Player of the Year	Nick McBride	Prince Albert Raiders
Jim Donlevy Memorial Trophy	Scholastic team of the Year	Kamloops Blazers	
Dunc McCallum Memorial Trophy	Coach of the Year	John Paddock	Regina Pats
Lloyd Saunders Memorial Trophy	Executive of the Year	Kelly McCrimmon	Brandon Wheat Kings
Allen Paradice Memorial Trophy	Top Official	Reagan Vetter	
St. Clair Group Trophy	Marketing/Public Relations Award	Kelowna Rockets	
Doug Wickenheiser Memorial Trophy	Humanitarian of the Year	Taylor Vickerman	Tri-City Americans
WHL Playoff MVP	WHL Finals Most Valuable Player	Leon Draisaitl	Kelowna Rockets
Professional Hockey Achievement; Academic Recipient	Alumni Achievement Awards	Shane Doan	

=== All-Star teams ===
==== Eastern Conference ====
First Team		Pos.	Second Team	
Player	Team	Pos.	Player	Team
Tristan Jarry	Edmonton Oil Kings	G	Jordan Papirny	Brandon Wheat Kings
Ivan Provorov	Brandon Wheat Kings	D	Rinat Valiev	Kootenay Ice
Travis Sanheim	Calgary Hitmen	D	Colby Williams	Regina Pats
Trevor Cox	Medicine Hat Tigers	F	Cole Sanford	Medicine Hat Tigers
Tim McGauley	Brandon Wheat Kings	F	Sam Reinhart	Kootenay Ice
Brayden Point	Moose Jaw Warriors	F	Adam Tambellini	Calgary Hitmen

==== Western Conference ====
First Team		Pos.	Second Team	
Player	Team	Pos.	Player	Team
Taran Kozun	Seattle Thunderbirds	G	Eric Comrie	Tri-City Americans
Shea Theodore	Seattle Thunderbirds	D	Joe Hicketts	Victoria Royals
Madison Bowey	Kelowna Rockets	D	Josh Morrissey	Kelowna Rockets
Oliver Bjorkstrand	Portland Winterhawks	F	Nic Petan	Portland Winterhawks
Cole Ully	Kamloops Blazers	F	Nick Merkley	Kelowna Rockets
Rourke Chartier	Kelowna Rockets	F	Adam Helewka	Spokane Chiefs

== See also ==
- List of WHL seasons
- 2014–15 OHL season
- 2014–15 QMJHL season
- 2015 in ice hockey
- 2014 in ice hockey

Preceded by 2013–14 WHL season	WHL seasons	Succeeded by 2015–16 WHL season
