= Peter Quenneville =

Canadian ice hockey player (born 1994)

- Born: March 9, 1994 (age 32) Edmonton, Alberta, Canada
- Height: 5 ft 11 in (180 cm)
- Weight: 192 lb (87 kg; 13 st 10 lb)
- Position: Forward
- Shoots: Right
- Liiga team Former teams: Kiekko-Espoo; Lake Erie Monsters; Aalborg Pirates; HC Dynamo Pardubice; SaiPa; Sparta Warriors; Rockford IceHogs; Lausitzer Füchse; Storhamar Ishockey
- NHL draft: 195th overall, 2013; Columbus Blue Jackets
- Playing career: 2015–present

Peter Quenneville (born March 9, 1994) is a Canadian professional ice hockey forward who is currently playing for Ilves in the Liiga.

== Playing career ==
Quenneville played junior hockey initially with the Sherwood Park Crusaders in the Alberta Junior Hockey League (AJHL) before moving to the United States Hockey League to play with the Dubuque Fighting Saints. Quenneville was drafted by the Columbus Blue Jackets in the seventh round, 195th overall, in the 2013 NHL entry draft.

After two seasons playing primarily in the ECHL with the Rapid City Rush, on June 19, 2021, Quenneville again embarked on a career abroad, agreeing to a one-year contract with German second-tier club, Lausitzer Füchse, of the DEL2. In the 2021–22 season, he was top scorer of the DEL2. He then signed a two-year contract with the Norwegian first-tier team Storhamar Ishockey.

Following two seasons in Norway with Storhamar, Quenneville opted to return to the Finnish Liiga in signing a one-year contract with newly promoted club, Kiekko-Espoo, on July 30, 2024.

== Personal life ==
His younger brother John was drafted 30th overall by the New Jersey Devils in the 2014 NHL entry draft, and his youngest brother David Quenneville was drafted 200th overall in the 2016 NHL entry draft. Former NHL head coach Joel Quenneville is his first cousin, once-removed. New York Islanders defenceman Johnny Boychuk is his uncle by marriage.

== Career statistics ==
			Regular season					Playoffs
Season	Team	League	GP	G	A	Pts	PIM	GP	G	A	Pts	PIM
2010–11	Sherwood Park Crusaders	AJHL	54	6	16	22	8	3	0	0	0	0
2011–12	Sherwood Park Crusaders	AJHL	53	31	50	81	22	10	4	4	8	10
2012–13	Dubuque Fighting Saints	USHL	63	33	37	70	18	9	6	3	9	2
2013–14	Quinnipiac University	ECAC	5	0	4	4	2	—	—	—	—	—
2013–14	Brandon Wheat Kings	WHL	44	21	31	52	10	8	1	3	4	4
2014–15	Brandon Wheat Kings	WHL	72	27	48	75	20	19	10	10	20	4
2015–16	Cincinnati Cyclones	ECHL	58	11	15	26	34	—	—	—	—	—
2015–16	Lake Erie Monsters	AHL	1	0	0	0	0	—	—	—	—	—
2016–17	Aalborg Pirates	DEN	45	30	19	49	26	7	1	2	3	27
2017–18	HC Pardubice	ELH	12	2	1	3	25	—	—	—	—	—
2017–18	SaiPa	Liiga	9	3	1	4	2	—	—	—	—	—
2017–18	Aalborg Pirates	DEN	12	6	4	10	8	17	9	3	12	4
2018–19	Sparta Warriors	NOR	48	20	30	50	28	6	3	3	6	0
2019–20	Rapid City Rush	ECHL	51	24	34	58	24	—	—	—	—	—
2019–20	Rockford IceHogs	AHL	7	0	0	0	0	—	—	—	—	—
2020–21	Rapid City Rush	ECHL	68	28	40	68	20	—	—	—	—	—
2021–22	Lausitzer Füchse	DEL2	52	32	48	80	26	5	2	3	5	2
2022–23	Storhamar	NOR	42	19	30	49	4	17	12	8	20	27
2023–24	Storhamar	NOR	43	33	39	72	8	14	10	6	16	6
Liiga totals			9	3	1	4	2	—	—	—	—	—

== Awards and honours ==
Awards	Year
AJHL
North All-Star Team	2012
MVP	2012
USHL
USHL/NHL Top Prospects Game	2013
Second All-Star Team	2013
Clark Cup (Dubuque Fighting Saints)	2013
Metal Ligaen
Champion (Aalborg Pirates)	2018
ECHL
All-ECHL Second Team	2020–21
DEL2
Top scorer	2022
