= Dominic Turgeon =

Canadian-born American ice hockey player

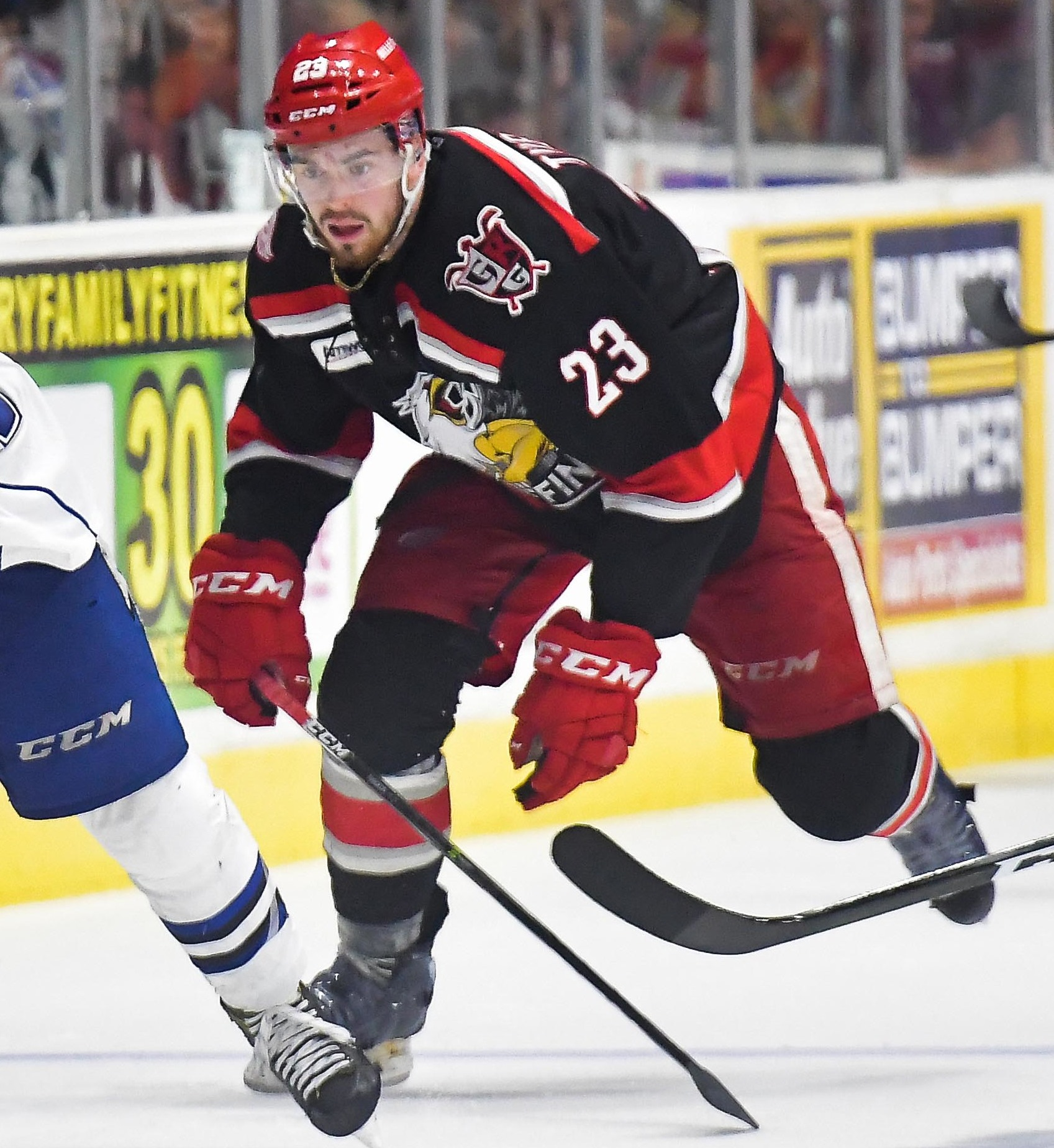
- Turgeon with the Grand Rapids Griffins in 2017
- Born: February 25, 1996 (age 30) Pointe-Claire, Quebec, Canada
- Height: 6 ft 2 in (188 cm)
- Weight: 203 lb (92 kg; 14 st 7 lb)
- Position: Centre
- Shoots: Left
- DEL2 team Former teams: EC Kassel Huskies; Detroit Red Wings; Ässät; Södertälje SK
- NHL draft: 63rd overall, 2014; Detroit Red Wings
- Playing career: 2016–present

Dominic Turgeon (born February 25, 1996) is a Canadian-American professional ice hockey player currently under contract with the Kassel Huskies of the DEL2. Turgeon was drafted 63rd overall by the Detroit Red Wings in the 2014 NHL entry draft.

== Playing career ==
=== Amateur ===
Turgeon was drafted 64th overall by the Portland Winterhawks in the 2011 WHL Bantam Draft. During the 2011–12 season, Turgeon made his Western Hockey League (WHL) debut, appearing in one game.

Turgeon played for the USA Hockey National Team Development Program during the 2012–13 season, recording three assists in seven games.

Turgeon scored three goals and five assists in 54 regular season games for the Portland Winterhawks in the 2012–13 season, when the Winterhawks won the Ed Chynoweth Cup.

During the 2013–14 season, Turgeon recorded ten goals and 21 assists in 65 regular season games for the Winterhawks with an additional two goals and six assists in 21 playoff games, as the Hawks advanced to the WHL Finals for the second straight season, before losing to the WHL Champions Edmonton Oil Kings.

During the 2014–15 season, Turgeon recorded 18 goals and 25 assists in 67 regular season games for the Winterhawks. During the playoffs, he recorded eight goals and one assist in 17 playoff games, losing in the Western Conference Finals to the eventual WHL Champions Kelowna Rockets. On September 25, 2015, Turgeon was named team captain of the Winterhawks.

During the 2015–16 season, Turgeon recorded 36 goals and 34 assists in 72 regular season games for the Winterhawks, leading the team in scoring. During the playoffs, he was limited to just two playoff games after having season-ending surgery on his right shoulder.

=== Professional ===
On May 9, 2015, Turgeon signed a three-year entry-level contract with the Detroit Red Wings.

During the 2016–17 season, Turgeon recorded six goals and 12 assists in 71 games for the Grand Rapids Griffins. During the 2017 Calder Cup playoffs, he recorded one goal and one assist in 19 games, and won the Calder Cup.

On January 13, 2018, Turgeon was recalled by the Red Wings. Prior to being recalled he recorded nine goals and 14 assists in 40 games for the Griffins. He made his NHL debut for the Red Wings in a game against the Chicago Blackhawks the next day. He went on to skate in four games for the Red Wings, averaging 9:36 of ice time and recording two shots on goal. On January 23, he was returned to the Griffins.

On July 26, 2019, the Red Wings re-signed Turgeon to a one-year, two-way contract extension. During the 2019–20 season, Turgeon appeared in all 63 games for the Griffins, and recorded 10 goals and 13 assists. On September 28, 2020, the Red Wings re-signed Turgeon to a one-year contract extension. On January 12, 2021, the Red Wings assigned Turgeon to the Grand Rapids Griffins.

On July 28, 2021, as a free agent from the Red Wings, Turgeon signed a one-year, two-way contract with the Minnesota Wild.

At the conclusion of his contract within the Wild organization, Turgeon opted to pursue a career abroad, agreeing to a one-year contract with Finnish club, Ässät of the Liiga, on August 12, 2022.

== International play ==
Medal record

Representing United States

Ice hockey

World U-17 Hockey Challenge
Bronze medal – third place	2013 Canada	

Ivan Hlinka Memorial Tournament
Silver medal – second place	2013 Czech Republic / Slovakia	

Born to a Canadian father and an American mother, Turgeon has dual citizenship and represented the United States at the 2013 World U-17 Hockey Challenge, where he recorded three assists in six games, and won a bronze medal. Later that year he again represented the United States at the 2013 Ivan Hlinka Memorial Tournament, where he recorded one assist in five games and won a silver medal.

== Personal life ==
Turgeon is the son of former NHL player Pierre Turgeon, and the nephew of Sylvain Turgeon. Turgeon was born in Pointe-Claire, Quebec, while his father was a member of the Montreal Canadiens.

Turgeon grew up in both Chesterfield, Missouri and Arlington, Texas, before his family settled in Cherry Hills Village, Colorado. He has three sisters, Alexandra, Elizabeth and Valerie. Elizabeth died in a car accident on December 23, 2010, near Vaughn, New Mexico, at age 18.

== Career statistics ==
=== Regular season and playoffs ===
			Regular season					Playoffs
Season	Team	League	GP	G	A	Pts	PIM	GP	G	A	Pts	PIM
2011–12	Portland Winterhawks	WHL	1	0	0	0	0	—	—	—	—	—
2012–13	U.S. National Development Team	USHL	7	0	3	3	0	—	—	—	—	—
2012–13	Portland Winterhawks	WHL	54	3	5	8	2	5	0	0	0	0
2013–14	Portland Winterhawks	WHL	65	10	21	31	31	21	2	6	8	18
2014–15	Portland Winterhawks	WHL	67	18	25	43	36	17	8	1	9	0
2015–16	Portland Winterhawks	WHL	72	36	34	70	22	2	0	1	1	0
2016–17	Grand Rapids Griffins	AHL	71	6	12	18	6	19	1	1	2	2
2017–18	Grand Rapids Griffins	AHL	69	14	18	32	23	—	—	—	—	—
2017–18	Detroit Red Wings	NHL	5	0	0	0	2	—	—	—	—	—
2018–19	Grand Rapids Griffins	AHL	72	6	14	20	41	3	1	2	3	0
2018–19	Detroit Red Wings	NHL	4	0	0	0	0	—	—	—	—	—
2019–20	Grand Rapids Griffins	AHL	63	10	13	23	4	—	—	—	—	—
2020–21	Grand Rapids Griffins	AHL	31	6	7	13	7	—	—	—	—	—
2021–22	Iowa Wild	AHL	58	6	9	15	26	—	—	—	—	—
2022–23	Porin Ässät	Liiga	60	6	12	18	10	8	1	3	4	2
2023–24	Södertälje SK	Allsv	48	10	8	18	11	—	—	—	—	—
NHL totals			9	0	0	0	2	—	—	—	—	—
Liiga totals			60	6	12	18	10	8	1	3	4	2

=== International ===
Year	Team	Event	Result	GP	G	A	Pts	PIM
2013	United States	U17	3rd place, bronze medalist(s)	6	0	3	3	0
2013	United States	IH18	2nd place, silver medalist(s)	5	1	0	0	0
Junior totals				11	1	3	3	0

== Awards and honors ==
Award	Year
WHL
Ed Chynoweth Cup	2012–13
AHL
Calder Cup	2016–17
