= Jayce Hawryluk =

Canadian ice hockey player (born 1996)

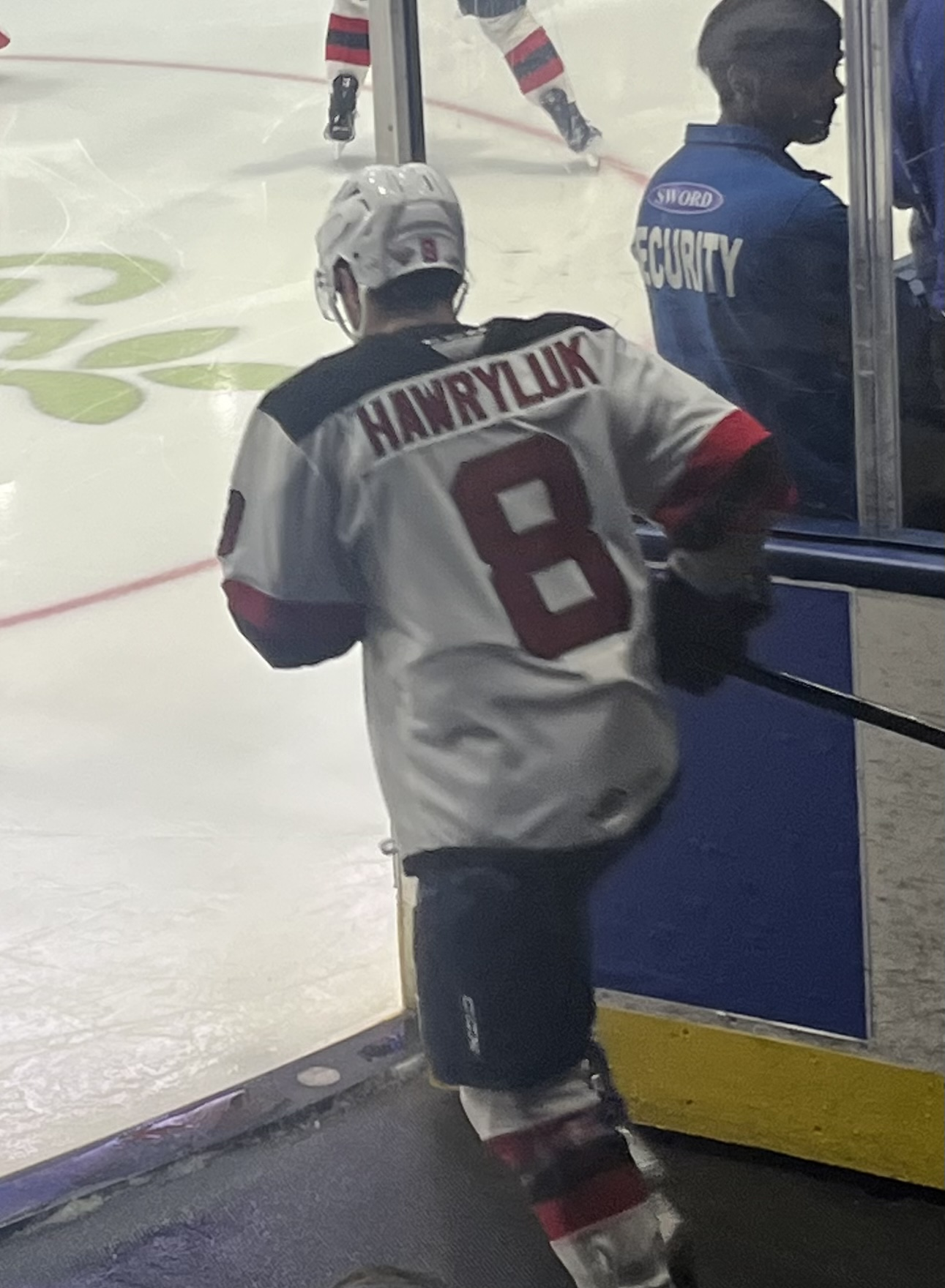
- Hawryluk with the Utica Comets in 2023
- Born: January 1, 1996 (age 30) Yorkton, Saskatchewan, Canada
- Height: 5 ft 11 in (180 cm)
- Weight: 196 lb (89 kg; 14 st 0 lb)
- Position: Centre
- Shoots: Right
- NL team Former teams: EHC Kloten; Florida Panthers; Ottawa Senators; Vancouver Canucks; Skellefteå AIK; HC Bílí Tygři Liberec; HC Nové Zámky
- NHL draft: 32nd overall, 2014; Florida Panthers
- Playing career: 2016–present

Jayce Hawryluk (born January 1, 1996) is a Canadian professional ice hockey player who is under contract with EHC Kloten of the Swiss National League. He was selected by the Florida Panthers of the National Hockey League (NHL) in the second round, 32nd overall, of the 2014 NHL entry draft. He also played with the Vancouver Canucks and Ottawa Senators of the NHL, Skellefteå AIK of the Swedish Hockey League, HC Bílí Tygři Liberec of the Czech Extraliga, and HC Nové Zámky of the Slovak Extraliga.

== Early life ==
Hawryluk was born January 1, 1996, in Yorkton, Saskatchewan, Canada. He has Ukrainian roots. Hawryluk grew up in Roblin, Manitoba and was once featured on Hockey Day in Canada after becoming a "goal-scoring machine" in the Parkland Region of Manitoba.

== Playing career ==
=== Amateur ===
Hawryluk was selected by the Brandon Wheat Kings in the second round (32nd overall) of the 2011 Western Hockey League (WHL) Bantam Draft. He made his Wheat Kings debut in the 2012–13 WHL season, playing in 61 games, scoring 18 goals and 25 assists for 43 points. In the following 2013–14 season he recorded 24 goals and 64 points in 59 games. The Wheat Kings qualified for the 2014 WHL playoffs and advanced to the semi-finals where they were eliminated by the Edmonton Oil Kings. Hawryluk added five goals and 12 points in eight playoff games.

In the 2014–15 season scored 30 goals and 65 points in 54 games. The Wheat Kings made the 2015 WHL playoffs and advanced to the finals where they faced the Kelowna Rockets. Kelowna swept Brandon in four games of their best-of-seven series. Hawryluk finished with ten goals and 19 points in 16 playoff games. Hawryluk finished fourth in WHL scoring with 106 points (47 goals, 59 assists) in 58 games for the Wheat Kings in the 2015–16 season. He was named the WHL player of the month for February 2016 after scoring seven goals and 33 points in 13 games in the month. In the 2016 WHL playoffs, Hawryluk and the Wheat Kings reached the WHL final for the second year in a row. Hawryluk lead the charge in the fifth game of the series, recording three goals and two assists in Brandon's 8–4 win to capture the Ed Chynoweth Trophy. He finished the playoffs with seven goals and 22 points in 21 games. He was named a WHL Second Team All-Star for the season. Hawryluk finished his WHL career with 119 goals, 159 assists for 278 points in 232 regular season games. He totaled 61 points (22 goals, 39 assists) in 45 career WHL playoff games.

With their WHL finals victory, the Wheat Kings qualified for the 2016 Memorial Cup, the interleague championship between all the leagues of the Canadian Hockey League, determined by a round-robin tournament. The Wheat Kings, representing the WHL, faced the London Knights of the Ontario Hockey League, the Rouyn-Noranda Huskies of the Quebec Major Junior Hockey League and the host Red Deer Rebels, also of the WHL. Brandon was eliminated by Red Deer on May 25, 2016 in a 2–1 loss, finishing fourth in the tournament. Hawryluk sat out the game with an upper body injury.

=== Professional ===
Hawryluk was selected by the Florida Panthers of the National Hockey League (NHL) in the second round, 32nd overall, of the 2014 NHL entry draft. On March 1, 2016, Hawryluk signed a three-year entry-level contract with the Panthers. Hawryluk turned professional after being assigned to the Panthers' American Hockey League (AHL) affiliate, the Springfield Thunderbirds for the 2016–17 season. In 47 games with Springfield, he put up nine goals and 26 points. Hawryluk began the 2017–18 season with the Thunderbirds after being cut from Panthers training camp. He played most of the season in the AHL before being assigned the ECHL team, the Manchester Monarchs, on March 28, 2018. He played in 64 games with Springfield, netting ten goals and 36 points and six games with Manchester, recording two assists.

Hawryluk again started the 2018–19 season in the AHL with the Thunderbirds after being cut from training camp. However, after 25 games, Hawryluk was recalled to the NHL on December 15, 2018, alongside Henrik Borgström. He made his NHL debut that night against the Toronto Maple Leafs. Hawryluk scored his first two career NHL goals in a 6–3 win over the Chicago Blackhawks on December 23, 2018. He finished the season with seven goals and 15 points in 42 games with Florida and eight goals and 32 points in 31 games with Springfield. In the 2019 offseason, Hawlryuk signed a one-year contract with the Panthers. He made the Panthers out of training camp in the following 2019–20 season, and appeared in eight games, playing primarily on the third line, before suffering an upper body injury. He returned from injury in December and was assigned to Springfield on a conditioning loan. He returned to the Panthers lineup in February having missed 28 games. He played in 15 games with Florida, scoring one goal and three points.

On February 16, 2020, Hawryluk was placed on waivers by the Panthers and was claimed by the Ottawa Senators on February 17. Added to the Senators' lineup, he made his Ottawa debut on February 20 against the Winnipeg Jets. He recorded his first point for Ottawa on February 24, assisting on Colin White's third period goal in a 4–3 loss to the Columbus Blue Jackets. He scored his first goal for the Senators on March 3 in a 7–3 loss to the Pittsburgh Penguins. Hawryluk contributed with two goals and seven points in only 11 games before the NHL suspended the season due to the COVID-19 pandemic on March 12. As an impending restricted free agent and with the Senators undergoing a roster overhaul, Hawryluk was not tendered a qualifying offer, releasing him to free agency.

On October 19, 2020, Hawryluk was signed to a one-year, two-way contract with the Vancouver Canucks. In the pandemic-shortened 2020–21 season, Hawryluk began on the Canucks long-term injured reserve list after suffering an upper body injury in training camp. He was activated on February 13, 2021 and made his Canucks debut on February 25 in a 3–0 loss to the Edmonton Oilers. He scored his first goal in a Vancouver uniform against his former team, the Ottawa Senators, in a 3–2 victory on March 15. He made 30 appearances with the team in a checking-line role, registering two goals and five points as the club failed to return to the playoffs.

As a free agent from his lone season with the Canucks, Hawryluk paused his NHL career and opted to sign his first European contract in agreeing to a one-year deal with Swedish club, Skellefteå AIK of the Swedish Hockey League (SHL), on September 3, 2021. He played in 39 games in the SHL in the 2021–22 season, scoring eight goals and 19 points. Skellefteå AIK qualified for the SHL playoffs and faced Färjestad BK in the quarterfinals. In the best-of-seven series, Skellefteå AIK was eliminated by Färjestad BK in six games, four games to two. Hawryluk recorded one assist in six playoff games.

After his tenure in the SHL, Hawryluk returned to North America and signed a one-year, two-way contract with former club, the Ottawa Senators, on July 25, 2022. Assigned to the AHL for the 2022–23 season, Hawryluk registered three goals and eight points in 19 games. Without featuring for Ottawa, on March 10, 2023, Hawryluk was traded by the Senators to the New Jersey Devils in exchange for future considerations. Assigned to the Devils affiliate, the Utica Comets, Hawryluk played out the remainder of the season in the AHL posting three points in seven regular season games. The Comets qualified for the 2023 Calder Cup playoffs and beat the Laval Rocket in the best-of-three series in two games before facing the Toronto Marlies in a best-of-five series. The Marlies eliminated the Comets in four games and Hawryluk recorded six assists through their six-game playoff run.

As a free agent from the Devils, Hawryluk returned to Europe in agreeing to a one-year contract with HC Bílí Tygři Liberec of the Czech Extraliga (ELH), on September 11, 2023 ahead of the 2023–24 season. In 39 games in the ELH, Hawryluk posted eight goals and 22 points. The team qualified for the playoffs and advanced to the quarterfinals after defeating HC Olomouc in the wild card round in five games. In the quarterfinals they faced HC Sparta Praha, which eliminated them in four straight games. Hawryluk recorded three points in nine playoff games.

On October 30, 2024, Hawryluk signed a one-year contract with HC Nové Zámky of the Slovak Extraliga. He recorded 27 points in 23 games with HC Nové Zámky before signing with EHC Kloten of the Swiss National League on January 19, 2025.

== International play ==
Hawryluk was selected to play with Team Western Canada at the 2013 World U-17 Hockey Challenge, and he helped the Canadian squad win the gold medal at the 2013 Ivan Hlinka Memorial Tournament. Hawryluk also helped Canada men's national under-18 ice hockey team capture the bronze medal at the 2014 IIHF World U18 Championships.

== Career statistics ==
=== Regular season and playoffs ===
			Regular season					Playoffs
Season	Team	League	GP	G	A	Pts	PIM	GP	G	A	Pts	PIM
2012–13	Brandon Wheat Kings	WHL	61	18	25	43	46	—	—	—	—	—
2013–14	Brandon Wheat Kings	WHL	59	24	40	64	44	8	5	7	12	14
2014–15	Brandon Wheat Kings	WHL	54	30	35	65	69	16	10	9	19	24
2015–16	Brandon Wheat Kings	WHL	58	47	59	106	101	21	7	23	30	39
2016–17	Springfield Thunderbirds	AHL	47	9	17	26	47	—	—	—	—	—
2017–18	Springfield Thunderbirds	AHL	64	10	26	36	82	—	—	—	—	—
2017–18	Manchester Monarchs	ECHL	6	0	2	2	6	—	—	—	—	—
2018–19	Springfield Thunderbirds	AHL	31	8	24	32	64	—	—	—	—	—
2018–19	Florida Panthers	NHL	42	7	5	12	16	—	—	—	—	—
2019–20	Florida Panthers	NHL	15	1	2	3	8	—	—	—	—	—
2019–20	Springfield Thunderbirds	AHL	6	0	1	1	6	—	—	—	—	—
2019–20	Ottawa Senators	NHL	11	2	5	7	8	—	—	—	—	—
2020–21	Vancouver Canucks	NHL	30	2	3	5	9	—	—	—	—	—
2021–22	Skellefteå AIK	SHL	39	8	11	19	26	6	0	1	1	8
2022–23	Belleville Senators	AHL	19	3	5	8	27	—	—	—	—	—
2022–23	Utica Comets	AHL	7	2	1	3	4	6	0	6	6	2
2023–24	HC Bílí Tygři Liberec	ELH	39	8	14	22	22	9	0	3	3	8
NHL totals			98	12	15	27	41	—	—	—	—	—
SHL totals			39	8	11	19	26	6	0	1	1	8

=== International ===
Year	Team	Event	Result	GP	G	A	Pts	PIM
2013	Canada Western	U17	9th	4	0	0	0	16
2013	Canada	IH18	1st place, gold medalist(s)	5	1	0	1	6
2014	Canada	U18	3rd place, bronze medalist(s)	6	0	2	2	10
Junior totals				15	1	2	3	32

== Awards and honours ==
Award	Year
WHL
Ed Chynoweth Trophy	2016
East Second All-Star Team	2016
International
World U-17 Hockey Challenge (Western Canada)	2013
Ivan Hlinka Memorial Tournament Gold Medal	2013
IIHF World U18 Championship Bronze Medal	2014
