= Cole Ully =

Canadian ice hockey player

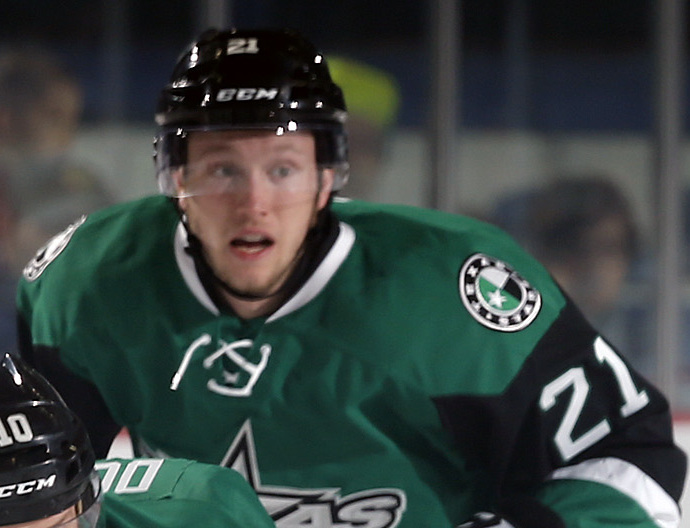
- Ully with the Texas Stars in 2015
- Born: February 20, 1995 (age 31) Calgary, Alberta, Canada
- Height: 6 ft 0 in (183 cm)
- Weight: 180 lb (82 kg; 12 st 12 lb)
- Position: Left Wing
- Shoots: Left
- EIHL team Former teams: Guildford Flames; Texas Stars; Colorado Eagles; HKM Zvolen; HK Poprad; Vasterviks IK; Cardiff Devils; Glasgow Clan
- NHL draft: 131st overall, 2013; Dallas Stars
- Playing career: 2015–present

Cole Ully (born February 20, 1995) is a Canadian professional ice hockey forward. He is currently signed to UK Elite Ice Hockey League (EIHL) side Guildford Flames.

Ully was selected by the Dallas Stars in the fifth round (131st overall) of the 2013 NHL entry draft.

== Playing career ==
Ully first played in the Alberta Midget Hockey League with the Calgary Jr. Flames. He was drafted 30th overall in the 2010 WHL Bantom Draft by the Kamloops Blazers.

Following his selection in the 2013 NHL entry draft, and in the midst of his fourth full season with the Blazers, Ully was signed to a three-year, entry-level contract with the Dallas Stars on December 19, 2014. During the 2014–15 WHL season while playing with the Kamloops Blazers, Ully scored 34 goals and 60 assists, and was named to the WHL Western Conference First All-Star Team.

Ully played the duration of his entry-level contract within the Dallas Stars minor league affiliate's, the Texas Stars and Idaho Steelheads.

As an impending restricted free agent from the Stars following the 2017–18 season, Ully was not tendered a qualifying offer and was released to free agency. On August 2, 2018, Ully agreed to a one-year AHL contract with the Colorado Eagles, affiliate to the Colorado Avalanche. After attending the Eagles inaugural AHL training camp, Ully was re-assigned to begin the 2018–19 season in the ECHL, with affiliate the Utah Grizzlies, on September 30, 2018. Ully made 38 appearances with the Grizzlies, posting 41 points, while suiting up in two contests with the Eagles during the season.

As a free agent from the Eagles, Ully continued in the AHL, securing a one-year contract with the Hershey Bears on August 12, 2019.

After two seasons within the Bears organization, Ully left North America and signed a European contract with Slovakian club, HKM Zvolen, on July 8, 2021. He made 14 appearances with Zvolen, collecting 11 points before ending his stint with the club on November 10, 2021. After that Ully played for HK Poprad in the Slovak Extraliga and he earned 34 points.

After a brief stint in Sweden with Vasterviks IK, Ully signed for Welsh side, Cardiff Devils of the EIHL, for the 2023–24 season on July 9, 2023. Ully moved to Glasgow Clan for the 2024–25 season.In the off-season of 2025 he made a move to fellow EIHL side Guildford Flames.

== Career statistics ==
			Regular season					Playoffs
Season	Team	League	GP	G	A	Pts	PIM	GP	G	A	Pts	PIM
2010–11	Calgary Flames	AMHL	32	17	17	34	20	2	0	0	0	0
2010–11	Kamloops Blazers	WHL	1	0	1	1	0	—	—	—	—	—
2011–12	Kamloops Blazers	WHL	55	9	11	20	2	6	1	1	2	2
2012–13	Kamloops Blazers	WHL	62	22	28	50	37	15	1	7	8	4
2013–14	Kamloops Blazers	WHL	69	30	42	72	34	—	—	—	—	—
2014–15	Kamloops Blazers	WHL	69	34	60	94	32	—	—	—	—	—
2014–15	Texas Stars	AHL	2	0	1	1	0	—	—	—	—	—
2015–16	Texas Stars	AHL	42	7	11	18	18	—	—	—	—	—
2015–16	Idaho Steelheads	ECHL	6	1	5	6	0	—	—	—	—	—
2016–17	Texas Stars	AHL	61	13	11	24	29	—	—	—	—	—
2017–18	Texas Stars	AHL	16	0	3	3	12	—	—	—	—	—
2017–18	Idaho Steelheads	ECHL	39	19	21	40	34	11	2	8	10	8
2018–19	Utah Grizzlies	ECHL	38	14	27	41	28	2	0	2	2	2
2018–19	Colorado Eagles	AHL	2	0	0	0	0	—	—	—	—	—
2019–20	South Carolina Stingrays	ECHL	53	12	36	48	52	—	—	—	—	—
2020–21	South Carolina Stingrays	ECHL	55	24	36	60	16	13	4	8	12	0
2021–22	HKM Zvolen	Slovak	14	4	7	11	8	—	—	—	—	—
2021–22	HK Poprad	Slovak	32	14	20	34	16	6	0	0	0	4
2022–23	Västerås IK	Allsv	7	1	4	5	0	—	—	—	—	—
AHL totals			123	20	26	46	59	—	—	—	—	—

== Awards and honours ==
Award	Year
WHL
First Team All Star (West)	2015
ECHL
All-ECHL Second Team	2020–21
