= Gage Quinney =

American ice hockey player (born 1995)

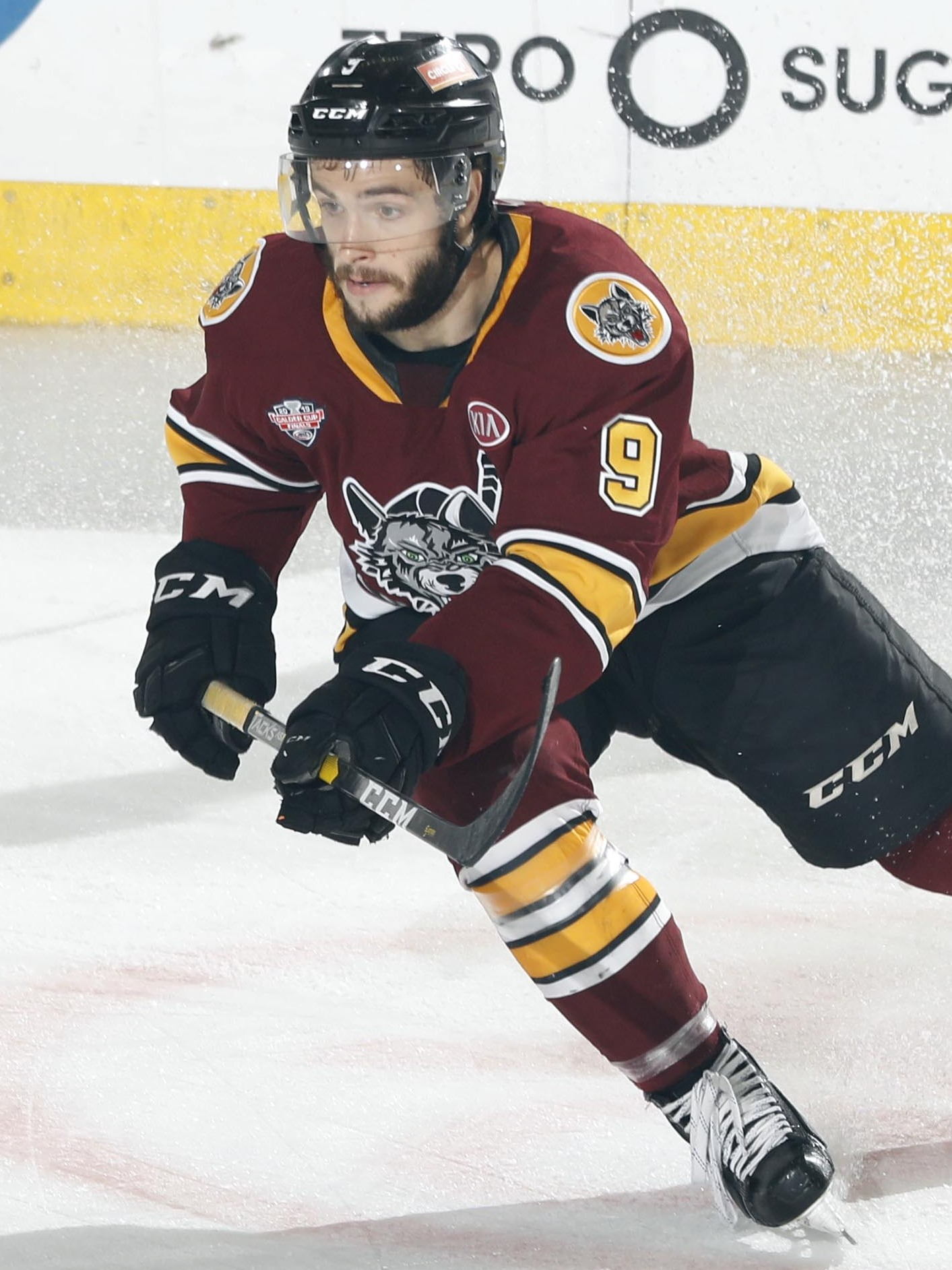
- Quinney with the Chicago Wolves in 2019
- Born: July 29, 1995 (age 31) Las Vegas, Nevada, U.S.
- Height: 5 ft 11 in (180 cm)
- Weight: 185 lb (84 kg; 13 st 3 lb)
- Position: Left wing
- Shoots: Left
- KHL team Former teams: HC Sochi; Vegas Golden Knights; Shanghai Dragons
- NHL draft: Undrafted
- Playing career: 2016–present

Gage Quinney (born July 29, 1995) is an American professional ice hockey forward for HC Sochi of the Kontinental Hockey League (KHL). Quinney is notable as the first Nevada-born player in National Hockey League (NHL) history, making his debut with his hometown team, the Vegas Golden Knights.

== Playing career ==
Quinney played as a youth with the Phoenix Jr. Coyotes and in his hometown with the Las Vegas Storm of the T1EHL. Showing offensive potential, Quinney was selected 83rd overall in the 2011 USHL Futures draft by the Tri-City Storm before opting to play major junior hockey in Canada for the Prince Albert Raiders, Kelowna Rockets and Kamloops Blazers in the Western Hockey League (WHL).

Undrafted, he began his professional career in the 2016–17 season, signing an ECHL contract with the Wheeling Nailers on October 10, 2016. After producing at a point-per-game pace, Quinney began the following 2017–18 season with the American Hockey League (AHL) affiliate Wilkes-Barre/Scranton Penguins. Continuing to play in a top-nine role, Quinney was able to continue his offensive output at the AHL level, contributing with 14 goals and 33 points in 57 games with Wilkes-Barre.

On June 2, 2018, Quinney was signed to his first NHL contract, agreeing to a two-year, entry-level contract with his hometown club, the Vegas Golden Knights. After attending the Golden Knights 2018 training camp, Quinney was re-assigned to AHL affiliate, the Chicago Wolves for the 2018–19 season. Securing a forward role amongst the top-six with the Wolves, Quinney established new career highs with 19 goals and 24 assists for 43 points in 68 regular season games. He added 9 points in 18 post-season games, helping the Wolves reach the Calder Cup finals before losing to the Charlotte Checkers.

In the following 2019–20 season, Quinney continued his assignment with the Chicago Wolves. He added 32 points in just 42 games before receiving his first recall to the NHL by the Golden Knights on February 21, 2020. Quinney became the first native Nevadan to play in an NHL game, making his debut with the Golden Knights against the Florida Panthers on February 22, 2020. He registered his first point, an assist, in his second game with the Golden Knights in a 6-5 overtime victory against the Anaheim Ducks on February 23, 2020.

A free agent at the conclusion of his NHL contract, Quinney opted to remain within the Golden Knights' organization, agreeing to a one-year AHL contract with the Henderson Silver Knights on July 14, 2022. Following the conclusion of his Henderson contract, Quinney re-joined the Golden Knights on a two-year contract on July 1, 2023.

Following seven seasons in the Golden Knights' organization, Quinney went overseas, signing a one-year contract with the Shanghai Dragons of the Kontinental Hockey League on August 15, 2025. On August 29 he scored the first two goals in the franchise's history, albeit in the pre-season Mayor of Moscow Cup.

On June 20, 2026, Quinney continued his tenure in the KHL by signing a one-year contract with Russian club, HC Sochi, for the 2026–27 season.

== Personal ==
His father, Ken Quinney, played hockey for the Las Vegas Thunder of the International Hockey League (IHL) from 1993 to 1998.

== Career statistics ==
			Regular season					Playoffs
Season	Team	League	GP	G	A	Pts	PIM	GP	G	A	Pts	PIM
2011–12	Phoenix Jr. Coyotes	T1EHL	4	1	1	2	0	—	—	—	—	—
2012–13	Las Vegas Storm	T1EHL	37	24	16	40	27	—	—	—	—	—
2012–13	Prince Albert Raiders	WHL	1	0	0	0	0	—	—	—	—	—
2013–14	Prince Albert Raiders	WHL	58	8	8	16	5	4	0	0	0	0
2014–15	Prince Albert Raiders	WHL	32	6	9	15	2	—	—	—	—	—
2014–15	Kelowna Rockets	WHL	38	10	21	31	4	15	6	7	13	8
2015–16	Kelowna Rockets	WHL	5	2	5	7	2	—	—	—	—	—
2015–16	Kamloops Blazers	WHL	48	27	23	50	22	7	3	6	9	9
2016–17	Wheeling Nailers	ECHL	45	18	26	44	10	—	—	—	—	—
2017–18	Wilkes-Barre/Scranton Penguins	AHL	57	14	19	33	18	3	0	0	0	0
2018–19	Chicago Wolves	AHL	68	19	24	43	17	18	4	5	9	0
2019–20	Chicago Wolves	AHL	46	17	19	36	8	—	—	—	—	—
2019–20	Vegas Golden Knights	NHL	3	0	1	1	0	—	—	—	—	—
2020–21	Henderson Silver Knights	AHL	19	10	7	17	8	3	1	1	2	0
2021–22	Henderson Silver Knights	AHL	38	12	11	23	8	2	0	0	0	0
2022–23	Henderson Silver Knights	AHL	66	25	39	64	22	—	—	—	—	—
2023–24	Henderson Silver Knights	AHL	39	8	20	28	4	—	—	—	—	—
2024–25	Henderson Silver Knights	AHL	50	9	27	36	6	—	—	—	—	—
2025–26	Shanghai Dragons	KHL	67	11	21	32	10	—	—	—	—	—
NHL totals			3	0	1	1	0	—	—	—	—	—
KHL totals			67	11	21	32	10	—	—	—	—	—
