= Jackson Whistle =

Canadian ice hockey player (born 1995)

- Born: 9 June 1995 (age 31) Kelowna, British Columbia, Canada
- Height: 1.85 m (6 ft 1 in)
- Weight: 87 kg (192 lb; 13 st 10 lb)
- Position: Goaltender
- Catches: Left
- EIHL team Former teams: Belfast Giants; Vancouver Giants; Kelowna Rockets; Sheffield Steelers; Nottingham Panthers
- National team: Great Britain
- NHL draft: Undrafted
- Playing career: 2016–present

Jackson Whistle (born 9 June 1995) is a Canadian-born British professional ice hockey goaltender currently playing for the Belfast Giants of the Elite Ice Hockey League and the British national team. He represented Great Britain at the 2019 IIHF World Championship, 2021 IIHF World Championship, 2022 IIHF World Championship and 2024 IIHF World Championship.

Whistle previously played for the Belfast Giants during an earlier spell between 2016 and 2018, before spending one season with both the Sheffield Steelers and Nottingham Panthers.

== Playing career ==
=== Junior career ===
Whistle played Atom hockey in the Bracknell Bees system, before moving back to Canada where he played for the Pursuit of Excellence Hockey Academy. He was subsequently selected as the Vancouver Giants fourth-round pick in the 2010 WHL Bantam Draft. Before playing with the Giants, Whistle was a member of the Gold Medal winning British Columbia team at the 2011 Canada Winter Games. After his first season with the Giants, in which he played 21 games as back-up to starter Adam Morrison, he was traded for a 3rd-round pick in 2014 Bantam Draft to the Kelowna Rockets.

During his first two seasons with the Rockets, Whistle played as back-up to starting goaltender Jordon Cooke. In the 2014–15 WHL season he was named as the team's starting Goaltender. Whistle was named November WHL Goalie of the Month after winning 12 of the team's first 14 games of the season. The run of good form continued all season, culminating in the Rockets winning their fourth WHL Championship by beating the Brandon Wheat Kings 4–0 in the finals. As a result, the team qualified for the 2015 Memorial Cup, where they progressed to the final, losing 2–1 in overtime to Oshawa Generals.

Whistle's final season with the Rockets was marred by injury, as he suffered a torn labrum in both hips which resulted in season-ending surgery.

=== Professional career ===
Whistle started his professional career in the July 2016, signing with the Belfast Giants of the EIHL, where he served as back-up to long-time incumbent Stephen Murphy.

Whistle acted as the starting goaltender for much of the 2017-18 season, as a result of Stephen Murphy picking up a season ending injury early in the season. Whistle played 44 games for the Giants, posting a 3.38 GAA with a .895 SV%.

Whilst the Giants would finish 5th in the league, and lose in the playoff quarterfinal, they did take home some silverware, winning the Challenge Cup for the 2nd time in their history, beating the Cardiff Devils 6–3 in the final. Following the completion of the campaign, Whistle joined the Sheffield Steelers, signing a 2-year contract.

In his first season with the Steelers Whistle was named starter following the release of Matt Climie, playing in 50 of the team's 60 games during the 2018–19 EIHL season. During this time he posted a posting a 3.20 GAA with a .898 SV% and was named as the EIHL Player of the Week in February, with coach Tom Barrasso describing him as the team's best player. The Steelers would finish the season in 7th place, before losing in the Playoff quarterfinals to the Cardiff Devils.

In July 2019, Whistle made the shock move from Sheffield to their closest rivals Nottingham Panthers.

In July 2021, Whistle rejoined the Belfast Giants ahead of the 2021-22 Elite League season and has remained with them since, winning the Challenger Cup, the League title and the Playoff cup in the 22–23 season. His team also qualified for the Champions Hockey League but Whistle did not play at all.

== International play ==
Although born in Canada, Whistle is eligible to play for Great Britain as a result of spending his childhood years in the country. He made his international debut at the 2018 IIHF World Championships, coming in as relief for starter Ben Bowns in a 6–1 loss to Kazakhstan, conceding 1 goal. Despite this loss, Team GB won the rest of their games and gained promotion to the IIHF World Championships for the first time in 25 years.

Whistle once again represented Great Britain at the 2019 IIHF World Championship. As back-up to Bowns he did not start any games, however, he came off the bench in losses to Canada, Denmark and Slovakia, conceding 9 goals across the 3 games. He played three games at the 2021 IIHF World Championship.

In 2024 Whistle would again represent Great Britain at the World Championships he would finish the tournament with a 88.1 SV% and a 4.06 GAA. Whistle would play four out of the seven games.

== Personal life ==
He is the son of former player and coach David Whistle. His younger brother Brandon also plays for the Belfast Giants.

== Career statistics ==
=== Regular season and playoffs ===
			Regular season									Playoffs
Season	Team	League	GP	W	L	T/OT	MIN	GA	SO	GAA	SV%	GP	W	L	MIN	GA	SO	GAA	SV%
2011–12	Vancouver Giants	WHL	21	1	7	3	863	52	1	3.61	.873	—	—	—	—	—	—	—	—
2012–13	Kelowna Rockets	WHL	21	15	2	1	1166	38	1	1.96	.931	1	?	?	?	?	?	2.74	.889
2013–14	Kelowna Rockets	WHL	22	18	4	0	1314	58	1	2.65	.917	—	—	—	—	—	—	—	—
2014–15	Kelowna Rockets	WHL	50	34	10	5	2962	126	4	2.55	.909	19	?	?	?	?	?	2.52	.916
2015–16	Kelowna Rockets	WHL	27	19	6	2	1559	66	2	2.54	.920	—	—	—	—	—	—	—	—
2016–17	Belfast Giants	EIHL	14	10	3	0	830	36	1	2.60	.903	—	—	—	—	—	—	—	—
2017–18	Belfast Giants	EIHL	44	27	15	0	2576	145	0	3.38	.895	2	1	1	120	8	0	3.85	.855
2018–19	Sheffield Steelers	EIHL	50	25	23	0	2815	150	1	2.20	.898	2	1	1	120	10	0	5.12	.853
2019–20	Nottingham Panthers	EIHL	9	5	4	0	—	—	1	2.91	.900	—	—	—	—	—	—	—	—
2021	Nottingham Panthers	Elite Series	9	6	2	0	—	—	1	2.56	.920	—	—	—	—	—	—	—	—
2021–22	Belfast Giants	EIHL	15	10	2	0	—	—	0	2.30	.917	—	—	—	—	—	—	—	—

=== International ===
			Regular season
Season	Team	League	GP	W	L	T/OT	MIN	GA	SO	GAA	SV%
2018	Great Britain	WC D1	1	0	1	0	14	1	0	4.26	.889
2019	Great Britain	WC	3	0	3	0	91	9	0	5.89	.848
2021	Great Britain	WC	3	0	2	0	129	11	0	5.13	.874
2022	Great Britain	WC	2	0	2	0	100	4	0	2.40	.930
2024	Great Britain	WC	2	0	2	0	237	16	0	4.06	.881
2025	Great Britain	WC D1	2	2	0	0	121	5	0	2.47	.915

== Awards and honours ==
Awards	Year
WHL
WHL Champion	2014–15
EIHL
EIHL Champion	2021–22
EIHL Champion	2022–23
EIHL Playoffs Champion	2022–23
EIHL Challenge Cup	2017–18
EIHL Challenge Cup	2021–22
EIHL Challenge Cup	2022–23
EIHL Challenge Cup	2024–25
International
IIHF World Championship Division I	2018
IIHF World Championship Division I	2023
IIHF World Championship Division I	2025
