= Colby Williams =

Canadian ice hockey player (born 1995)

- Born: January 26, 1995 (age 31) Regina, Saskatchewan, Canada
- Height: 6 ft 0 in (183 cm)
- Weight: 200 lb (91 kg; 14 st 4 lb)
- Position: Defence
- Shoots: Right
- KHL team Former teams: HC Sochi; Hershey Bears; Belleville Senators; Admiral Vladivostok; CSKA Moscow; Lada Togliatti
- NHL draft: 173rd overall, 2015; Washington Capitals
- Playing career: 2016–present

Colby Williams (born January 26, 1995) is a Canadian professional ice hockey defenceman currently playing with HC Sochi of the Kontinental Hockey League (KHL). He was drafted 173rd overall by the Washington Capitals in the sixth round of the 2015 NHL entry draft and previously played in the American Hockey League (AHL) for the Hershey Bears and Belleville Senators.

== Playing career ==
=== Junior ===
After playing minor hockey in the Saskatchewan Male U18 AAA Hockey League (SMAAAHL), Williams was drafted 64th overall by the Regina Pats of the Western Hockey League (WHL) in the 2010 WHL Bantam Draft.

On 18 January 2011, Williams made his WHL debut in a 4–3 loss against the Moose Jaw Warriors. On 13 October 2012, he scored his first WHL points with two assists in a 4–3 win against the Everett Silvertips, playing 59 games with 19 assists in his rookie WHL season. He scored his first two WHL goals in a 5–4 overtime loss against the Kelowna Rockets on 14 December 2013, ultimately playing 66 games with nine goals and 23 assists in his sophomore season. In the 2014–15 WHL season, he improved on his previous numbers, with 11 goals and 30 assists in 64 games played. Prior to his final WHL season, he was named the captain of the Pats as an overage player, however, he missed most of the season with a wrist injury, finishing with five goals and seven assists in 19 appearances.

=== Professional ===
Williams was drafted 173rd overall by the Washington Capitals in the sixth round of the 2015 NHL Entry Draft. On 22 October 2016, he made his professional debut with the Capitals' AHL affiliate, the Hershey Bears, in a 5–2 win against the Bridgeport Sound Tigers, recording his first AHL assist. On 4 November 2016, he scored his first professional goal in a 3–2 overtime win against the Springfield Thunderbirds, which was the game-winning goal in his two-point performance. He ultimately recorded four goals and 12 assists in 60 appearances for the Bears in his first professional season, winning the Bears' rookie of the year award.

The Capitals signed Williams to a two-year entry-level contract on 2 March 2017. In the 2017–18 AHL season, he played 69 games with three goals and 14 assists for the Bears. In the 2018–19 AHL season, he played 36 games with ten assists. The Capitals re-signed Williams to a one-year two-way contract extension on 13 July 2019, where he appeared in 31 games with six assists for the Hershey Bears in the 2019–20 AHL season.

On 8 January 2021, the Belleville Senators signed Williams to a one-year AHL contract.

As a free agent from the Senators, Williams signed his first contract abroad after agreeing to a one-year contract with Russian club, Admiral Vladivostok of the KHL, on July 20, 2022.

After splitting the 2025–26 season with CSKA Moscow and Lada Togliatti, Williams as a free agent opted to continue his tenure in the KHL, agreeing to a one-year deal with HC Sochi on June 4, 2026.

== Personal life ==
Williams is a part-owner of a hockey consulting business based in Regina.

== Career statistics ==
			Regular season					Playoffs
Season	Team	League	GP	G	A	Pts	PIM	GP	G	A	Pts	PIM
2012–13	Regina Pats	WHL	59	0	19	19	70	—	—	—	—	—
2013–14	Regina Pats	WHL	66	9	23	32	82	4	0	0	0	8
2014–15	Regina Pats	WHL	64	11	30	41	95	9	3	5	8	12
2015–16	Regina Pats	WHL	19	5	7	12	20	12	2	7	9	14
2016–17	Hershey Bears	AHL	60	4	12	16	40	3	1	0	1	4
2017–18	Hershey Bears	AHL	69	3	14	17	94	—	—	—	—	—
2018–19	Hershey Bears	AHL	36	0	10	10	33	3	0	0	0	4
2019–20	Hershey Bears	AHL	31	0	6	8	46	—	—	—	—	—
2020–21	Belleville Senators	AHL	27	3	7	10	24	—	—	—	—	—
2021–22	Belleville Senators	AHL	51	2	6	8	64	2	0	0	0	2
2022–23	Admiral Vladivostok	KHL	67	1	17	18	40	9	0	0	0	8
2023–24	Admiral Vladivostok	KHL	21	0	2	2	56	—	—	—	—	—
2023–24	CSKA Moscow	KHL	33	1	8	9	11	—	—	—	—	—
2024–25	CSKA Moscow	KHL	43	1	10	11	18	6	0	1	1	4
2025–26	CSKA Moscow	KHL	24	1	2	3	12	—	—	—	—	—
2025–26	Lada Togliatti	KHL	26	1	6	7	10	—	—	—	—	—
AHL totals			278	13	55	68	303	8	1	0	1	10
KHL totals			214	5	45	50	147	15	0	1	1	12
