= Tim McGauley =

Canadian ice hockey player

- Born: July 23, 1995 (age 30) Wilcox, Saskatchewan, Canada
- Height: 6 ft 0 in (183 cm)
- Weight: 188 lb (85 kg; 13 st 6 lb)
- Position: Forward
- Shoots: Left
- EIHL team Former teams: Manchester Storm; Stjernen Hockey; HC Innsbruck; ERC Ingolstadt; EC Kassel Huskies; Fehérvár AV19; Vålerenga Ishockey; Eispiraten Crimmitschau
- NHL draft: Undrafted
- Playing career: 2016–present

Tim McGauley (born July 23, 1995) is a Canadian professional ice hockey forward currently playing for Manchester Storm in the British Elite Ice Hockey League.

== Playing career ==
McGauley formerly played in the Western Hockey League (WHL) with the Saskatoon Blades and Brandon Wheat Kings. He made his debut in the WHL in 2010–11 WHL season playing 14 games as a 16-year-old with the Blades. During the 2014–15 WHL season, McGauley scored 42 goals and 63 assists for the Brandon Wheat Kings and was named to the WHL Eastern Conference First All-Star Team. In five seasons he would play in 271 games in the WHL and amass 259pts.

On October 5, 2015, as an undrafted free agent, McGauley signed a three-year entry-level contract with the Washington Capitals of the National Hockey League.

Upon concluding his junior career, and embarking on his first professional year in the 2016–17 season, McGauley was injured during Capitals training camp and was assigned to AHL affiliate, the Hershey Bears. Upon receiving medical clearance he was assigned to secondary affiliate, the South Carolina Stingrays of the ECHL for conditioning on December 14, 2016. He registered 17 points in 39 games with the Stingrays.

In the following 2017–18 season, McGauley continued with the Stingrays, increasing his offensive output with 36 points in 48 games. He also made his debut in the AHL with the Bears, in a 7–6 defeat to the Lehigh Valley Phantoms on March 2, 2018. He would contribute with 3 assists in 14 games for Hershey before returning to complete the season with South Carolina.

As an impending restricted free agent from the Capitals, McGauley was not tendered a qualifying offer and was released to free agency. On August 2, 2018, McGauley agreed to a one-year AHL contract with the Colorado Eagles. He split the 2018–19 season between the Eagles and ECHL affiliate, the Utah Grizzlies, setting new career bests in the AHL with 8 points in 23 games. On July 29, 2019, McGauley opted to continue within the Eagles organization, signing a one-year contract extension.

In the following 2019–20 season, McGauley was unable to repeat his previous season appearances with the Eagles, limited to just 10 games. He spent the majority of his contract leading the Utah Grizzlies in scoring, finishing among league leaders with 42 assists and 62 points in just 49 games before the season was cancelled due to the COVID-19 pandemic. He was later named to the ECHL's Second All-Star Team.

As a free agent from the Colorado Eagles, McGauley opted to pursue a European career by signing a one-year contract with Norwegian club, Stjernen Hockey of the GET-ligaen on June 26, 2020. In 24 games with Stjernen, he had 11 goals and 23 assists.

For the 2021-22 season, he signed with HC Innsbruck of the ICE Hockey League.

== Career statistics ==
			Regular season					Playoffs
Season	Team	League	GP	G	A	Pts	PIM	GP	G	A	Pts	PIM
2010–11	Regina Pat Canadians	SMHL	38	12	9	21	10	4	1	0	1	0
2010–11	Saskatoon Blades	WHL	5	0	0	0	2	—	—	—	—	—
2011–12	Notre Dame Hounds	SMHL	41	29	24	53	51	—	—	—	—	—
2011–12	Notre Dame Hounds	SJHL	1	0	0	0	0	—	—	—	—	—
2011–12	Brandon Wheat Kings	WHL	14	0	0	0	0	1	0	0	0	0
2012–13	Brandon Wheat Kings	WHL	66	17	28	45	6	—	—	—	—	—
2013–14	Brandon Wheat Kings	WHL	68	21	39	60	21	9	3	2	5	2
2014–15	Brandon Wheat Kings	WHL	72	42	63	105	24	19	8	11	19	2
2015–16	Brandon Wheat Kings	WHL	51	22	27	49	24	21	8	18	26	8
2016–17	South Carolina Stingrays	ECHL	39	4	13	17	8	—	—	—	—	—
2017–18	South Carolina Stingrays	ECHL	48	13	23	36	12	4	0	0	0	0
2017–18	Hershey Bears	AHL	14	0	3	3	2	—	—	—	—	—
2018–19	Utah Grizzlies	ECHL	39	14	14	28	31	3	4	0	4	0
2018–19	Colorado Eagles	AHL	23	2	6	8	2	—	—	—	—	—
2019–20	Utah Grizzlies	ECHL	49	20	42	62	15	—	—	—	—	—
2020–21	Stjernen Hockey	Hockey Elitserien	24	11	23	34	12	—	—	—	—	—
2021–22	HC Innsbruck	ICE Hockey League	46	19	29	48	53	—	—	—	—	—
AHL totals			47	3	9	12	6	—	—	—	—	—

== Awards and honours ==
Award	Year
SMHL
Second All-Star Team	2012
WHL
First Team All Star (East)	2015
East Conference Player of the Year	2015
ECHL
All-ECHL Second Team	2020
