= Nick Merkley =

Canadian ice hockey player (born 1997)

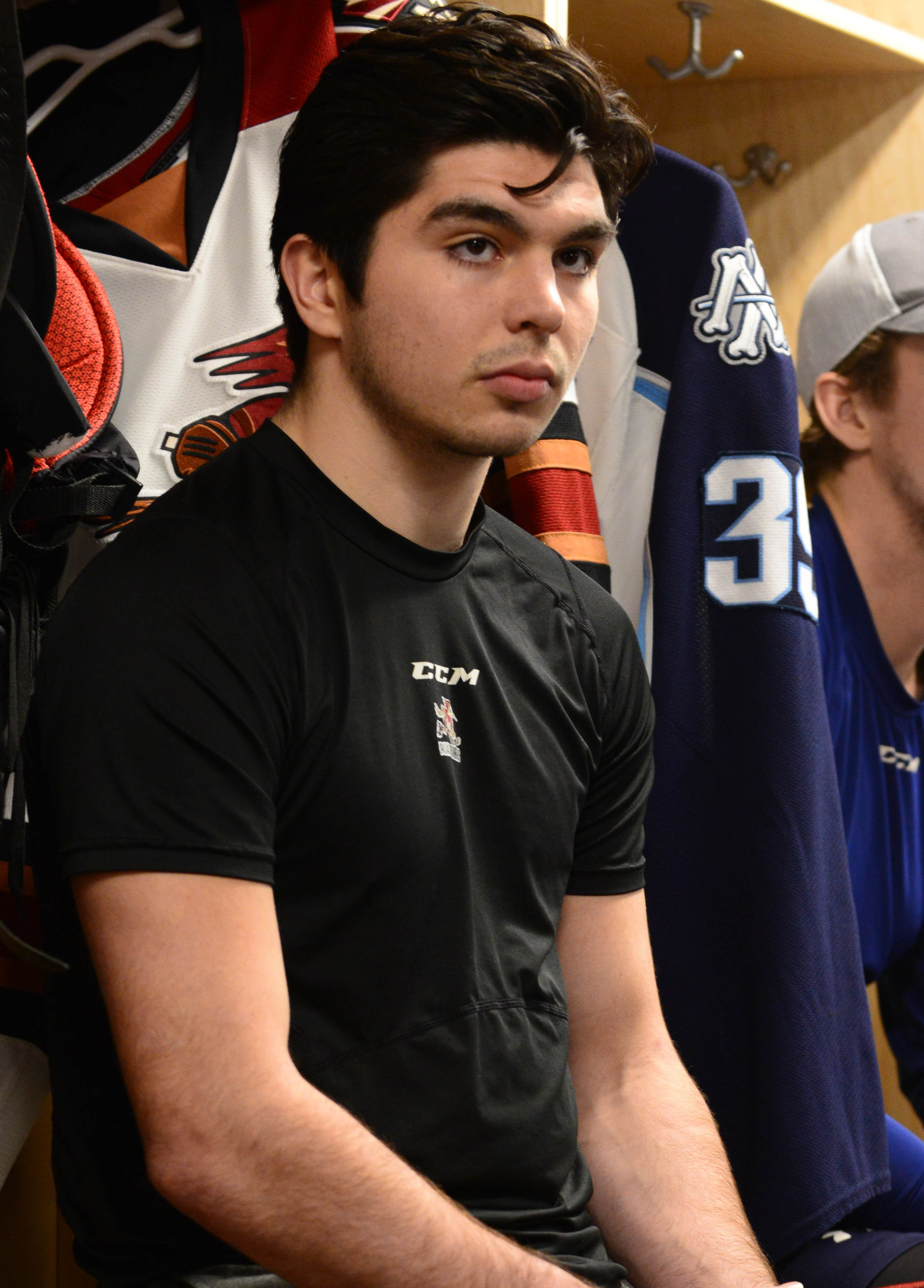
- Merkley in 2018
- Born: May 23, 1997 (age 29) Calgary, Alberta, Canada
- Height: 5 ft 10 in (178 cm)
- Weight: 195 lb (88 kg; 13 st 13 lb)
- Position: Forward
- Shoots: Right
- KHL team Former teams: Dynamo Moscow; Arizona Coyotes; New Jersey Devils; Ässät; San Jose Sharks; Dinamo Minsk; Avtomobilist Yekaterinburg; Shanghai Dragons
- NHL draft: 30th overall, 2015; Arizona Coyotes
- Playing career: 2017–present

Nicholas Merkley (born May 23, 1997) is a Canadian professional ice hockey right winger currently playing under contract with HC Dynamo Moscow in the Kontinental Hockey League (KHL). Merkley was formerly rated as a top prospect who was widely projected to be a first-round selection in the 2015 NHL entry draft. In the said Draft, he was selected 30th overall by the Arizona Coyotes, the final pick of the opening round.

== Playing career ==
Merkley was selected ninth overall by the Kelowna Rockets in the 2012 WHL Bantam Draft. Following a strong first season with the Rockets, he was selected as the 2013–14 WHL Rookie of the Year and awarded the Jim Piggott Memorial Trophy, and during the 2014–15 WHL season he was rewarded for his outstanding play when he was selected to skate in the 2015 CHL/NHL Top Prospects Game and was also named to the 2014–15 WHL (West) Second All-Star Team after scoring 20 goals and 90 points in 72 games.

On September 3, 2015, Merkley agreed to a three-year entry-level contract with the Arizona Coyotes.

He made his NHL debut on December 19, 2017, against the Florida Panthers. He played 13 minutes 30 seconds of ice time in a 3–2 loss. He was sent back down to the AHL shortly after. On January 4, 2018, Merkley was selected for the 2018 AHL All-Star Classic Game in Utica, New York.

During the 2019–20 season while with the Tucson Roadrunners, Merkley was traded by the Coyotes to the New Jersey Devils in a deal involving star forward Taylor Hall on December 16, 2019. Merkley joined the Devils' AHL affiliate, the Binghamton Devils, and was instantly productive in collecting 8 goals and 19 points in 28 regular season games. He was later recalled by the New Jersey Devils, adding a goal and an assist in four games, before the regular season was abruptly ended due to the COVID-19 pandemic.

As an impending restricted free agent with the Devils and with the team unable to qualify in the return to play format, Merkley signed a one-year contract with the Finnish Liiga club Ässät on August 27, 2020, in order to stay in game shape. His contract included an NHL-out clause until commencement of the delayed 2020–21 North American season.

On July 26, 2021, Merkley was traded to the San Jose Sharks in exchange for Christián Jaroš. He signed a one-year contract three days later. He made his debut for the Sharks on October 30, 2021, in a 2–1 win over the Winnipeg Jets. Three days later, he recorded his first point as an assist in a 5–3 victory against the Buffalo Sabres. His first goal came on November 4, 2021, in a 3–5 loss to the St. Louis Blues.

On March 21, 2022, Merkley was traded by the Sharks to the New York Rangers in exchange for Anthony Bitetto at the NHL trade deadline.

On August 1, 2022, having left the Rangers as a free agent, Merkley agreed to a one-year contract with Belarusian club, HC Dinamo Minsk of the KHL, for the 2022–23 season.

On July 8, 2024, Merkley signed a two-year contract to play for another KHL team, Avtomobilist Yekaterinburg.

On 16 August 2025, Merkely continued his career in the KHL, moving to newly rebranded Shanghai Dragons on a one-year contract for the 2025–26 season. Merkley contributed with 45 points through 68 regular season games with Shanghai before opting to move on a one-year contract to fellow KHL club, HC Dynamo Moscow, on June 5, 2026.

== International play ==
Merkley helped Team Canada capture the gold medal at the 2014 Ivan Hlinka Memorial Tournament.

== Career statistics ==
=== Regular season and playoffs ===
			Regular season					Playoffs
Season	Team	League	GP	G	A	Pts	PIM	GP	G	A	Pts	PIM
2012–13	Calgary Buffaloes	AMHL	30	14	19	33	95	11	4	6	10	16
2012–13	Kelowna Rockets	WHL	1	0	0	0	0	7	0	3	3	0
2013–14	Kelowna Rockets	WHL	66	25	33	58	46	14	4	13	17	12
2014–15	Kelowna Rockets	WHL	72	20	70	90	79	19	5	22	27	18
2015–16	Kelowna Rockets	WHL	43	17	31	48	44	—	—	—	—	—
2016–17	Kelowna Rockets	WHL	63	23	40	63	73	17	6	13	19	22
2017–18	Tucson Roadrunners	AHL	38	18	21	39	22	—	—	—	—	—
2017–18	Arizona Coyotes	NHL	1	0	0	0	2	—	—	—	—	—
2018–19	Tucson Roadrunners	AHL	45	10	24	34	26	—	—	—	—	—
2019–20	Tucson Roadrunners	AHL	26	3	13	16	10	—	—	—	—	—
2019–20	Binghamton Devils	AHL	28	8	11	19	16	—	—	—	—	—
2019–20	New Jersey Devils	NHL	4	1	1	2	2	—	—	—	—	—
2020–21	Ässät	Liiga	19	4	9	13	33	—	—	—	—	—
2020–21	New Jersey Devils	NHL	27	2	8	10	7	—	—	—	—	—
2020–21	Binghamton Devils	AHL	5	1	2	3	4	—	—	—	—	—
2021–22	San Jose Barracuda	AHL	43	11	25	36	28	—	—	—	—	—
2021–22	San Jose Sharks	NHL	9	1	2	3	0	—	—	—	—	—
2021–22	Hartford Wolf Pack	AHL	16	5	6	11	10	—	—	—	—	—
2022–23	Dinamo Minsk	KHL	67	20	20	40	88	5	1	2	3	28
2023–24	Dinamo Minsk	KHL	65	16	16	32	55	6	3	1	4	6
2024–25	Avtomobilist Yekaterinburg	KHL	59	11	9	20	40	7	1	1	2	2
2025–26	Shanghai Dragons	KHL	68	24	21	45	47	—	—	—	—	—
NHL totals			41	4	11	15	11	—	—	—	—	—
KHL totals			259	71	66	137	230	18	5	4	9	36

=== International ===
Year	Team	Event	Result	GP	G	A	Pts	PIM
2014	Canada Pacific	U17	2nd place, silver medalist(s)	6	2	3	5	14
2014	Canada	IH18	1st place, gold medalist(s)	5	0	4	4	8
Junior totals				11	2	7	9	22

== Awards and honours ==
Honours	Year
Jim Piggott Memorial Trophy – WHL Rookie of the Year	2013–14
Ivan Hlinka Memorial Tournament Gold Medal	2014
CHL/NHL Top Prospects Game	2015
WHL (West) Second All-Star Team	2015
CHL Memorial Cup All-Star Team	2015
American Hockey League All-Star Game	2018

Awards and achievements
Preceded by Dylan Strome	Arizona Coyotes first-round draft pick 2015	Succeeded by Clayton Keller
