= 2013–14 WHL season =

- League: Western Hockey League
- Sport: Ice hockey
- Duration: Regular season September 19, 2013 – March 16, 2014; Playoffs; March 20, 2014 – May 12, 2014
- Teams: 22
- TV partner(s): Shaw TV, Rogers Sportsnet, Root Sports Northwest

Regular season
- Scotty Munro Memorial Trophy: Kelowna Rockets (3)
- Season MVP: Sam Reinhart (Kootenay Ice)
- Top scorer: Mitch Holmberg (Spokane Chiefs)

Playoffs
- Playoffs MVP: Griffin Reinhart (Oil Kings)
- Finals champions: Edmonton Oil Kings (2)
- Runners-up: Portland Winterhawks

WHL seasons
- 2012–13 2014–15

2013–14 CHL seasons
- League: Canadian Hockey League
- Sport: Ice hockey
- Duration: OHL; September 2013 – March 2014; QMJHL; September 2013 – March 2014; WHL; September 19, 2013 – March 16, 2014
- Teams: 60
- TV partner(s): RDS, Rogers Sportsnet, Rogers TV, Shaw TV
- Season MVP: Anthony Mantha (Val-d'Or Foreurs) (QMHL)
- Top scorer: Connor Brown (Erie Otters) (OHL)

Memorial Cup
- Finals champions: Edmonton Oil Kings (WHL) (1st title)
- Runners-up: Guelph Storm (OHL)

The 2013–14 WHL season was the 48th season of the Western Hockey League (WHL). The regular season began on September 19, 2013, and ended on March 16, 2014. The Kelowna Rockets won their third Scotty Munro Memorial Trophy for best regular season, their first since 2003–04. The playoffs began on March 27, 2014, and ended on May 12, 2014. For the third straight season, the Edmonton Oil Kings and Portland Winterhawks faced off in the championships series. The Oil Kings won the Ed Chynoweth Cup for the second time in three seasons and earned a berth in the 2014 Memorial Cup tournament, which was held in London, Ontario. The Oil Kings went on to win their first Memorial Cup title.

== Standings ==
Map of WHL, 2011–12 to 2018–19
East Division
Central Division
BC Division
US Division

Western Conference
Pos	Team	Pld	W	L	OTL	SOL	GF	GA	Pts
1	x, y – Kelowna Rockets	72	57	11	0	4	310	182	118
2	x, y – Portland Winterhawks	72	54	13	2	3	338	207	113
3	x – Victoria Royals	72	48	20	1	3	238	181	100
4	x – Seattle Thunderbirds	72	41	25	2	4	238	249	88
5	x – Everett Silvertips	72	39	23	7	3	218	206	88
6	x – Spokane Chiefs	72	40	26	3	3	244	213	86
7	x – Vancouver Giants	72	32	29	7	4	234	248	75
8	x – Tri-City Americans	72	29	33	4	6	178	224	68
9	Prince George Cougars	72	27	37	3	5	238	305	62
10	Kamloops Blazers	72	14	53	2	3	175	305	33

x – clinched playoff spot; y – clinched division

Eastern Conference
Pos	Team	Pld	W	L	OTL	SOL	GF	GA	Pts
1	x, y – Edmonton Oil Kings	72	50	19	2	1	290	179	103
2	x, y – Regina Pats	72	39	26	4	3	257	247	85
3	x – Calgary Hitmen	72	48	17	3	4	287	207	103
4	x – Medicine Hat Tigers	72	44	24	3	1	260	196	92
5	x – Swift Current Broncos	72	38	25	3	6	248	229	85
6	x – Kootenay Ice	72	39	28	2	3	235	209	83
7	x – Brandon Wheat Kings	72	34	29	6	3	271	269	77
8	x – Prince Albert Raiders	72	35	32	3	2	243	258	75
9	Red Deer Rebels	72	35	32	1	4	214	224	75
10	Moose Jaw Warriors	72	21	42	3	6	202	283	51
11	Saskatoon Blades	72	16	51	2	3	207	317	37
12	Lethbridge Hurricanes	72	12	55	2	3	171	358	29

x – clinched playoff spot; y – clinched division

=== Eastern Conference Tiebreaker ===
==== Red Deer Rebels vs. Prince Albert Raiders ====
March 18	Red Deer Rebels	3 – 5	Prince Albert Raiders	ENMAX Centrium	Recap
11:52 - Wyatt Johnson (1)		First period	Jayden Hart (1) - 7:08
7:43 - Evan Polei (1); 13:57 - pp - Rhyse Dieno (1)		Second period	Reid Gardiner (1) - 11:01
No scoring		Third period	Collin Valcourt (1) - pp - 2:21; Dakota Conroy (1) - 4:43; Josh Morrissey (1) - en - 19:45
Patrik Bartošák (42 saves / 46 shots)		Goalie stats	Nick McBride (27 saves / 30 shots)

Prince Albert claims final playoff spot

== Statistical leaders ==
=== Scoring leaders ===
Players are listed by points, then goals.

Note: GP = Games played; G = Goals; A = Assists; Pts. = Points; PIM = Penalty minutes

Player	Team	GP	G	A	Pts.	PIM
Mitch Holmberg	Spokane Chiefs	72	62	56	118	25
Nic Petan	Portland Winterhawks	63	35	78	113	69
Oliver Bjorkstrand	Portland Winterhawks	69	50	59	109	36
Leon Draisaitl	Prince Albert Raiders	64	38	67	105	24
Sam Reinhart	Kootenay Ice	60	36	69	105	11
Todd Fiddler	Prince George Cougars	66	50	48	98	22
Jaedon Descheneau	Kootenay Ice	70	44	54	98	54
Graham Black	Swift Current Broncos	69	34	63	97	43
Henrik Samuelsson	Edmonton Oil Kings	65	35	60	95	97
Joshua Winquist	Everett Silvertips	67	47	46	93	44

=== Goaltenders ===
These are the goaltenders that lead the league in GAA that played at least 1440 minutes.

Note: GP = Games played; Mins = Minutes played; W = Wins; L = Losses; OTL = Overtime losses; SOL = Shootout losses; SO = Shutouts; GAA = Goals against average; Sv% = Save percentage

Player	Team	GP	Mins	W	L	OTL	SOL	SO	GAA	Sv%
Tristan Jarry	Edmonton Oil Kings	63	3703	44	14	2	1	8	2.24	.914
Jordon Cooke	Kelowna Rockets	51	3049	39	7	0	4	4	2.28	.922
Coleman Vollrath	Victoria Royals	34	1913	20	8	1	1	1	2.29	.928
Austin Lotz	Everett Silvertips	57	3229	31	18	3	2	5	2.53	.905
Patrik Polívka	Victoria Royals	43	2440	28	12	0	2	5	2.56	.915

== 2014 WHL Playoffs ==
Conference Quarterfinals	Conference Semifinals
1	Edmonton	4
8	Prince Albert	0
1	Edmonton	4
7	Brandon	1
2	Regina	0
7	Brandon	4
Eastern
3	Calgary	2
6	Kootenay	4
4	Medicine Hat	4
6	Kootenay	3
4	Medicine Hat	4
5	Swift Current	2
Note: Pairings are re-seeded after the first round.
1	Kelowna	4
8	Tri-City	1
1	Kelowna	4
4	Seattle	0
2	Portland	4
7	Vancouver	0
Western
3	Victoria	4
6	Spokane	2
2	Portland	4
3	Victoria	1
4	Seattle	4
5	Everett	1

Conference Finals
1	Edmonton	4
4	Medicine Hat	1
1	Kelowna	2
2	Portland	4

WHL Championship
E1	Edmonton	4
W2	Portland	3

== Conference Quarter-finals ==
=== Eastern Conference ===
==== (1) Edmonton Oil Kings vs. (8) Prince Albert Raiders ====
March 22	Edmonton Oil Kings	5 – 3	Prince Albert Raiders	Rexall Place	Recap
3:48 - Brett Pollock (1); 11:35 - Dysin Mayo (1); 13:55 - Brett Pollock (2)		First period	Josh Morrissey (1) - 6:15; Brendan Guhle (1) - 18:12
19:55 - Tyler Robertson (1)		Second period	Dakota Conroy (1) - pp - 10:39
19:08 - en - Curtis Lazar (1)		Third period	No scoring
Tristan Jarry (21 saves / 24 shots)		Goalie stats	Nick McBride (6 saves / 9 shots); Cole Cheveldave (32 saves / 33 shots)

March 23	Edmonton Oil Kings	3 – 1	Prince Albert Raiders	Rexall Place	Recap
No scoring		First period	No scoring
No scoring		Second period	No scoring
8:06 - pp - Riley Kieser (1); 12:41 - Dysin Mayo (2); 15:32 - Luke Bertolucci (1)		Third period	Dakota Conroy (2) - 0:20
Tristan Jarry (31 saves / 32 shots)		Goalie stats	Cole Cheveldave (29 saves / 32 shots)

March 25	Prince Albert Raiders	3 – 4	Edmonton Oil Kings	Art Hauser Centre	Recap
9:09 - Jayden Hart (1); 11:51 - Leon Draisaitl (1)		First period	No scoring
12:49 - Chance Braid (1)		Second period	Brett Pollock (3) - 7:53; Griffin Reinhart (1) - 11:28
No scoring		Third period	Edgars Kulda (1) - 13:37; Riley Kieser (2) - 17:28
Cole Cheveldave (33 saves / 37 shots)		Goalie stats	Tristan Jarry (24 saves / 27 shots)

March 26	Prince Albert Raiders	2 – 6	Edmonton Oil Kings	Art Hauser Centre	Recap
11:42 - Reid Gardiner (1)		First period	Tyler Robertson (2) - 1:26; Cody Corbett (1) - pp - 16:41
3:14 - Craig Leverton (1)		Second period	Mitch Moroz (1) - 1:53; Cody Corbett (2) - pp - 16:26
No scoring		Third period	Mitch Moroz (2) - pp - 1:38; Curtis Lazar (2) - 13:57
Cole Cheveldave (35 saves / 41 shots)		Goalie stats	Tristan Jarry (25 saves / 27 shots)

Edmonton wins series 4 – 0

==== (2) Regina Pats vs. (7) Brandon Wheat Kings ====
March 22	Regina Pats	3 – 6	Brandon Wheat Kings	Brandt Centre	Recap
No scoring		First period	Jayce Hawryluk (1) - 3:05; John Quenneville (1) - 8:34; Peter Quenneville (1) - pp - 14:36; Ryan Pilon (1) - 16:46
3:13 - Morgan Klimchuk (1); 10:51 - Dryden Hunt (1); 17:45 - Connor Gay (1)		Second period	Ryan Pulock (1) - 16:45
No scoring		Third period	Jesse Gabrielle (1) - 8:19
Dawson MacAuley (6 saves / 10 shots); Tyler Fuhr (23 saves / 25 shots)		Goalie stats	Jordan Papirny (31 saves / 34 shots)

March 23	Regina Pats	4 – 8	Brandon Wheat Kings	Brandt Centre	Recap
1:37 - Connor Gay (2)		First period	Jens Meilleur (1) - 11:30; Tim McGauley (1) - 14:46
12:40 - Morgan Klimchuk (2)		Second period	Ryley Lindgren (1) - 2:35; Richard Nejezchleb (1) - 4:17; John Quenneville (2) - 15:39; Ryan Pulock (2) - 18:15; Chad Robinson (1) - 18:45
7:38 - Boston Leier (1); 10:18 - Dryden Hunt (2)		Third period	Tim McGauley (2) - pp - 15:36
Dawson MacAuley (36 saves / 44 shots)		Goalie stats	Jordan Papirny (27 saves / 31 shots)

March 26	Brandon Wheat Kings	5 – 4	Regina Pats	Keystone Centre	Recap
5:29 - Jesse Gabrielle (2); 15:39 - Jayce Hawryluk (2); 18:01 - Jayce Hawryluk (3)		First period	Jesse Zgraggen (1) - 7:17; Dryden Hunt (3) - pp - 12:10; Carter Hansen (1) - 12:40; Dryden Hunt (4) - 13:55
3:19 - sh - Chad Robinson (2)		Second period	No scoring
15:10 - Jayce Hawryluk (4)		Third period	No scoring
Jordan Papirny (29 saves / 33 shots)		Goalie stats	Daniel Wapple (20 saves / 25 shots)

March 28	Brandon Wheat Kings	5 – 1	Regina Pats	Keystone Centre	Recap
12:31 - Jesse Gabrielle (3); 19:04 - Richard Nejezchleb (2)		First period	No scoring
No scoring		Second period	Morgan Klimchuk (3) - pp - 19:58
1:53 - Jayce Hawryluk (5); 13:30 - Ryley Lindgren (2); 17:04 - pp - John Quenneville (3)		Third period	No scoring
Jordan Papirny (28 saves / 29 shots)		Goalie stats	Daniel Wapple (37 saves / 42 shots)

Brandon wins series 4 – 0

==== (3) Calgary Hitmen vs. (6) Kootenay Ice ====
March 20	Calgary Hitmen	2 – 5	Kootenay Ice	Scotiabank Saddledome	Recap
4:06 - Greg Chase (1)		First period	Sam Reinhart (1) - pp - 10:28
No scoring		Second period	Luke Philp (1) - pp - 4:52; Zach Franko (1) - 17:01
19:00 - sh - Brady Brassart (1)		Third period	Sam Reinhart (2) - 8:21; Zach Franko (2) - 16:17
Chris Driedger (30 saves / 35 shots)		Goalie stats	Mackenzie Skapski (27 saves / 29 shots)

March 22	Calgary Hitmen	5 – 0	Kootenay Ice	Scotiabank Saddledome	Recap
6:29 - Landon Welykholowa (1)		First period	No scoring
1:33 - Alex Roach (1); 17:32 - Adam Tambellini (1)		Second period	No scoring
12:39 - pp - Brady Brassart (2); 19:35 - Landon Welykholowa (2)		Third period	No scoring
Chris Driedger (35 saves / 35 shots)		Goalie stats	Mackenzie Skapski (27 saves / 32 shots)

March 24	Kootenay Ice	6 – 7	OT	Calgary Hitmen	Western Financial Place	Recap
9:09 - pp - Luke Philp (2)		First period		Landon Welykholowa (3) - 3:22
3:46 - pp - Zach Franko (3); 13:29 - pp - Sam Reinhart (3); 15:27 - Jagger Dirk (1); 19:47 - pp - Jaedon Descheneau (1)		Second period		Landon Welykholowa (4) - 2:15; Adam Tambellini (2) - 4:43; Radel Fazleev (1) - 14:10
11:23 - pp - Jagger Dirk (2)		Third period		Travis Sanheim (1) - 5:17; Radel Fazleev (2) - 12:00
No scoring		First overtime period		Greg Chase (2) - 5:05
Mackenzie Skapski (21 saves / 28 shots); Wyatt Hoflin (2 saves / 2 shots)		Goalie stats		Chris Driedger (25 saves / 31 shots)

March 25	Kootenay Ice	5 – 4	Calgary Hitmen	Western Financial Place	Recap
3:02 - Luke Philp (3); 6:35 - Sam Reinhart (4); 14:34 - pp - Zach Franko (4)		First period	Jake Virtanen (1) - pp - 11:36; Ben Thomas (1) - 16:34
7:46 - Levi Cable (1)		Second period	Greg Chase (3) - 3:29; Pavel Padakin (1) - 6:26
19:08 - Jaedon Descheneau (2)		Third period	No scoring
Mackenzie Skapski (14 saves / 18 shots); Wyatt Hoflin (20 saves / 20 shots)		Goalie stats	Chris Driedger (27 saves / 32 shots)

March 27	Calgary Hitmen	5 – 6	Kootenay Ice	Scotiabank Saddledome	Recap
2:04 - pp - Adam Tambellini (3)		First period	Jaedon Descheneau (3) - pp - 5:56; Sam Reinhart (5) - 19:15
2:44 - Elliott Peterson (1); 18:28 - pp - Kenton Helgesen (1)		Second period	Levi Cable (2) - 0:55; Matt Alfaro (1) - 5:18; Luke Philp (4) - 6:18; Jaedon Descheneau (4) - 19:59
12:50 - Greg Chase (4); 18:46 - Adam Tambellini (4)		Third period	No scoring
Chris Driedger (10 saves / 14 shots); Mack Shields (8 saves / 10 shots)		Goalie stats	Mackenzie Skapski (26 saves / 31 shots)

March 29	Kootenay Ice	5 – 3	Calgary Hitmen	Western Financial Place	Recap
No scoring		First period	No scoring
1:43 - Jaedon Descheneau (5); 10:00 - Zach Franko (5)		Second period	No scoring
1:44 - Austin Vetterl (1); 11:02 - pp - Jaedon Descheneau (6); 19:23 - en - Jaedon Descheneau (7)		Third period	Brady Brassart (3) - 4:28; Adam Tambellini (5) - 16:28; Radel Fazleev (3) - 17:34
Wyatt Hoflin (36 saves / 39 shots)		Goalie stats	Chris Driedger (34 saves / 38 shots)

Kootenay wins series 4 – 2

==== (4) Medicine Hat Tigers vs (5) Swift Current Broncos ====
March 21	Medicine Hat Tigers	2 – 1	Swift Current Broncos	Medicine Hat Arena	Recap
14:57 - Curtis Valk (1)		First period	No scoring
No scoring		Second period	No scoring
2:55 - Chad Butcher (1)		Third period	Julius Honka (1) - pp - 8:40
Marek Langhamer (25 saves / 26 shots)		Goalie stats	Eetu Laurikainen (28 saves / 30 shots)

March 22	Medicine Hat Tigers	4 – 2	Swift Current Broncos	Medicine Hat Arena	Recap
No scoring		First period	No scoring
3:29 - pp - Tommy Vannelli (1); 19:14 - pp - Miles Koules (1)		Second period	No scoring
12:11 - Chad Butcher (2); 19:58 - en - Trevor Cox (1)		Third period	Jake DeBrusk (1) - 7:58; Nathan Burns (1) - 10:35
Marek Langhamer (34 saves / 36 shots)		Goalie stats	Eetu Laurikainen (33 saves / 36 shots)

March 25	Swift Current Broncos	3 – 1	Medicine Hat Tigers	Credit Union iPlex	Recap
11:32 - pp - Nathan Burns (2)		First period	Cole Sanford (1) - 16:21
No scoring		Second period	No scoring
13:51 - Jake DeBrusk (2); 18:51 - en - Julius Honka (2)		Third period	No scoring
Eetu Laurikainen (30 saves / 31 shots)		Goalie stats	Marek Langhamer (36 saves / 38 shots)

March 26	Swift Current Broncos	3 – 2	OT	Medicine Hat Tigers	Credit Union iPlex	Recap
No scoring		First period		Curtis Valk (2) - 7:23; Curtis Valk (3) - 8:23
1:06 - Graham Black (1)		Second period		No scoring
1:01 - Graham Black (2)		Third period		No scoring
5:06 - Jake DeBrusk (3)		First overtime period		No scoring
Eetu Laurikainen (39 saves / 41 shots)		Goalie stats		Marek Langhamer (42 saves / 45 shots)

March 29	Medicine Hat Tigers	4 – 1	Swift Current Broncos	Medicine Hat Arena	Recap
No scoring		First period	No scoring
7:29 - Trevor Cox (2)		Second period	No scoring
2:26 - Chad Butcher (3); 3:30 - Trevor Cox (3); 19:59 - en - Cole Sanford (2)		Third period	Nathan Burns (3) - pp - 10:18
Marek Langhamer (45 saves / 46 shots)		Goalie stats	Eetu Laurikainen (40 saves / 43 shots)

March 30	Swift Current Broncos	1 – 2	Medicine Hat Tigers	Credit Union iPlex	Recap
No scoring		First period	No scoring
9:35 - Nathan Burns (4)		Second period	No scoring
No scoring		Third period	Curtis Valk (4) - 2:11; Chad Labelle (1) - 17:36
Eetu Laurikainen (38 saves / 40 shots)		Goalie stats	Marek Langhamer (30 saves / 31 shots)

Medicine Hat wins series 4 – 2

=== Western Conference ===
==== (1) Kelowna Rockets vs. (8) Tri-City Americans ====
March 22	Kelowna Rockets	3 – 1	Tri-City Americans	Prospera Place	Recap
7:09 - Rourke Chartier (1)		First period	No scoring
17:53 - pp - Myles Bell (1)		Second period	Brian Williams (1) - pp - 0:47
19:17 - en - Rourke Chartier (2)		Third period	No scoring
Jordon Cooke (33 saves / 34 shots)		Goalie stats	Eric Comrie (32 saves / 34 shots)

March 23	Kelowna Rockets	3 – 1	Tri-City Americans	Prospera Place	Recap
14:40 - pp - Myles Bell (2); 17:18 - Ryan Olsen (1)		First period	Philip Tot (1) - 10:37
3:01 - Joe Gatenby (1)		Second period	No scoring
No scoring		Third period	No scoring
Jordon Cooke (24 saves / 25 shots)		Goalie stats	Eric Comrie (44 saves / 47 shots)

March 25	Tri-City Americans	4 – 3	Kelowna Rockets	Toyota Center	Recap
No scoring		First period	No scoring
15:43 - Jessey Astles (1); 16:51 - Philip Tot (2); 19:06 - Brian Williams (2)		Second period	No scoring
17:07 - Justin Gutierrez (1)		Third period	Myles Bell (3) - 7:22; Justin Kirkland (1) - pp - 14:05; Marek Tvrdoň (1) - pp - 18:57
Eric Comrie (52 saves / 55 shots)		Goalie stats	Jordon Cooke (33 saves / 37 shots)

March 26	Tri-City Americans	3 – 5	Kelowna Rockets	Toyota Center	Recap
No scoring		First period	Madison Bowey (1) - 4:24; Cole Linaker (1) - 12:40
18:27 - Philip Tot (3); 9:08 - Brian Williams (3)		Second period	Justin Kirkland (2) - 1:33; Marek Tvrdoň (2) - pp - 14:21
14:21 - Justin Hamonic (1)		Third period	Tyson Baillie (1) - 3:53
Eric Comrie (27 saves / 32 shots)		Goalie stats	Jordon Cooke (25 saves / 28 shots)

March 28	Kelowna Rockets	4 – 1	Tri-City Americans	Prospera Place	Recap
6:55 - Carter Rigby (1)		First period	No scoring
13:05 - Marek Tvrdoň (3)		Second period	Parker Bowles (1) - pp - 17:42
13:24 - pp - Marek Tvrdoň (4); 14:40 - Rourke Chartier (3)		Third period	No scoring
Jordon Cooke (29 saves / 30 shots)		Goalie stats	Eric Comrie (34 saves / 38 shots)

Kelowna wins series 4 – 1

==== (2) Portland Winterhawks vs. (7) Vancouver Giants ====
March 21	Portland Winterhawks	4 – 3	Vancouver Giants	Moda Center	Recap
12:37 - Brendan Leipsic (1); 13:20 - Oliver Bjorkstrand (1)		First period	Jackson Houck (1) - 6:08; Thomas Foster (1) - 17:22
18:19 - Brendan Leipsic (2)		Second period	No scoring
18:23 - Oliver Bjorkstrand (2)		Third period	Brett Kulak (1) - 7:16
Brendan Burke (13 saves / 16 shots)		Goalie stats	Payton Lee (41 saves / 45 shots)

March 22	Portland Winterhawks	3 – 0	Vancouver Giants	Moda Center	Recap
16:00 - pp - Nic Petan (1)		First period	No scoring
5:57 - Alex Schoenborn (1); 7:37 - Taylor Leier (1)		Second period	No scoring
No scoring		Third period	No scoring
Brendan Burke (15 saves / 15 shots)		Goalie stats	Payton Lee (40 saves / 43 shots)

March 25	Vancouver Giants	3 – 6	Portland Winterhawks	Pacific Coliseum	Recap
No scoring		First period	Derrick Pouliot (1) - pp - 5:30; Brendan Leipsic (3) - pp - 16:29
15:29 - Alec Baer (1)		Second period	Taylor Leier (2) - 1:21; Brendan Leipsic (4) - 7:00
9:33 - sh - Joel Hamilton (1); 11:55 - Trent Lofthouse (1)		Third period	Oliver Bjorkstrand (3) - 8:49; Paul Bittner (1) - 15:48
Payton Lee (28 saves / 34 shots)		Goalie stats	Brendan Burke (25 saves / 28 shots)

March 26	Vancouver Giants	1 – 6	Portland Winterhawks	Pacific Coliseum	Recap
No scoring		First period	Brendan Leipsic (5) - pp - 16:09; Adam de Champlain (1) - 16:41; Alex Schoenborn (2) - 17:05
9:47 - pp - Carter Popoff (1)		Second period	Oliver Bjorkstrand (4) - pp - 13:35
No scoring		Third period	Keegan Iverson (1) - 2:50; Chase De Leo (1) - 12:51
Payton Lee (10 saves / 13 shots); Jared Rathjen (29 saves / 32 shots)		Goalie stats	Brendan Burke (32 saves / 33 shots)

Portland wins series 4 – 0

==== (3) Victoria Royals vs. (6) Spokane Chiefs ====
March 22	Victoria Royals	2 – 1	OT	Spokane Chiefs	Save-On-Foods Memorial Centre	Recap
15:26 - Ben Walker (1)		First period		No scoring
No scoring		Second period		No scoring
No scoring		Third period		Riley Whittingham (1) - 2:22
8:10 - Travis Brown (1)		First overtime period		No scoring
Patrik Polívka (26 saves / 27 shots)		Goalie stats		Eric Williams (31 saves / 33 shots)

March 23	Victoria Royals	4 – 3	OT	Spokane Chiefs	Save-On-Foods Memorial Centre	Recap
1:27 - Logan Fisher (1); 9:31 - Brandon Magee (1)		First period		Dominic Zwerger (1) - 0:47
3:47 - Tyler Soy (1)		Second period		Ryan Hofer (1) - 4:33
No scoring		Third period		Reid Gow (1) - pp - 9:07
2:18 - Logan Nelson (1)		First overtime period		No scoring
Patrik Polívka (28 saves / 31 shots)		Goalie stats		Eric Williams (41 saves / 45 shots)

March 26	Spokane Chiefs	1 – 6	Victoria Royals	Spokane Veterans Memorial Arena	Recap
No scoring		First period	Ben Walker (2) - 0:11; Austin Carroll (1) - 7:37; Jordan Fransoo (1) - pp - 13:11; Austin Carroll (2) - pp - 15:44
10:04 - Ryan Hofer (2)		Second period	Logan Nelson (2) - 10:33
No scoring		Third period	Travis Brown (2) - pp - 18:31
Eric Williams (17 saves / 22 shots); Garret Hughson (1 save / 2 shots)		Goalie stats	Patrik Polívka (20 saves / 21 shots)

March 27	Spokane Chiefs	2 – 4	Victoria Royals	Spokane Veterans Memorial Arena	Recap
19:02 - Tyson Helgesen (1)		First period	Jordan Fransoo (2) - 14:48; Ben Walker (3) - 19:22
No scoring		Second period	No scoring
3:32 - Connor Chartier (1)		Third period	Austin Carroll (3) - 10:06; Logan Nelson (3) - 15:41
Eric Williams (17 saves / 21 shots)		Goalie stats	Patrik Polívka (32 saves / 34 shots)

Victoria wins series 4 – 0

==== (4) Seattle Thunderbirds vs. (5) Everett Silvertips ====
March 22	Seattle Thunderbirds	2 – 1	Everett Silvertips	ShoWare Center	Recap
2:27 - pp - Russell Maxwell (1); 11:44 - pp - Ryan Gropp (1)		First period	No scoring
No scoring		Second period	Patrick Bajkov (1) - pp - 2:43
No scoring		Third period	No scoring
Taran Kozun (38 saves / 39 shots)		Goalie stats	Austin Lotz (20 saves / 22 shots)

March 23	Everett Silvertips	1 – 3	Seattle Thunderbirds	Comcast Arena	Recap
Carson Stadnyk (1) - 3:51		First period	No scoring
No scoring		Second period	5:01 - pp - Roberts Lipsbergs (1)
No scoring		Third period	2:58 - Branden Troock (1); 8:45 - Russell Maxwell (2)
Austin Lotz (13 saves / 16 shots)		Goalie stats	Taran Kozun (26 saves / 27 shots)

March 25	Seattle Thunderbirds	4 – 3	OT	Everett Silvertips	ShoWare Center	Recap
Branden Troock (2) - 13:32		First period		5:54 - pp - Patrick Bajkov (2); 19:00 - pp - Patrick Bajkov (3)
Scott Eansor (1) - 4:02		Second period		17:54 - Mirco Mueller (1)
Scott Eansor (2) - 4:31		Third period		No scoring
Justin Hickman (1) - 3:47		First overtime period		No scoring
Taran Kozun (28 saves / 31 shots)		Goalie stats		Austin Lotz (25 saves / 29 shots)

March 28	Everett Silvertips	6 – 1	Seattle Thunderbirds	Comcast Arena	Recap
1:27 - Jujhar Khaira (1); 2:32 - sh - Joshua Winquist (1); 7:57 - Brayden Low (1)		First period	No scoring
No scoring		Second period	Jared Hauf (1) - 18:22
3:30 - Jujhar Khaira (2); 5:21 - pp - Jujhar Khaira (3); 6:48 - Carson Stadnyk (2)		Third period	No scoring
Austin Lotz (17 saves / 18 shots)		Goalie stats	Taran Kozun (23 saves / 29 shots); Danny Mumaugh (5 saves / 5 shots)

March 29	Seattle Thunderbirds	5 – 0	Everett Silvertips	ShoWare Center	Recap
No scoring		First period	No scoring
12:59 - Scott Eansor (3)		Second period	No scoring
1:15 - Branden Troock (3); 4:51 - Alexander Delnov (1); 7:02 - Branden Troock (4); 17:57 - Mitch Elliot (1)		Third period	No scoring
Taran Kozun (24 saves / 24 shots)		Goalie stats	Austin Lotz (26 saves / 31 shots)

Seattle wins series 4 – 1

== Conference Semi-finals ==
=== Eastern Conference ===
==== (1) Edmonton Oil Kings vs. (7) Brandon Wheat Kings ====
April 3	Edmonton Oil Kings	5 – 0	Brandon Wheat Kings	Rexall Place	Recap
1:50 - Brett Pollock (4); 2:25 - Mads Eller (1)		First period	No scoring
12:22 - pp - Ashton Sautner (1); 17:25 - Edgars Kulda (2)		Second period	No scoring
0:47 - pp - Henrik Samuelsson (1)		Third period	No scoring
Tristan Jarry (15 saves / 15 shots)		Goalie stats	Jordan Papirny (40 saves / 45 shots)

April 5	Edmonton Oil Kings	3 – 0	Brandon Wheat Kings	Rexall Place	Recap
5:49 - pp - Ashton Sautner (2); 16:06 - Edgars Kulda (3)		First period	No scoring
No scoring		Second period	No scoring
16:25 - Edgars Kulda (4)		Third period	No scoring
Tristan Jarry (29 saves / 29 shots)		Goalie stats	Jordan Papirny (54 saves / 57 shots)

April 8	Brandon Wheat Kings	2 – 5	Edmonton Oil Kings	Keystone Centre	Recap
No scoring		First period	Riley Kieser (3) - 16:13
4:38 - John Quenneville (4)		Second period	No scoring
18:59 - Richard Nejezchleb (3)		Third period	Mitch Moroz (3) - 5:40; Curtis Lazar (3) - pp - 8:38; Ashton Sautner (3) - pp - 17:05; Luke Bertolucci (2) - en - 19:26
Jordan Papirny (38 saves / 42 shots)		Goalie stats	Tristan Jarry (32 saves / 34 shots)

April 9	Brandon Wheat Kings	5 – 2	Edmonton Oil Kings	Keystone Centre	Recap
6:05 - Richard Nejezchleb (4); 11:35 - Tim McGauley (3)		First period	Cody Corbett (3) - 9:37
No scoring		Second period	Luke Bertolucci (3) - 7:47
6:32 - sh - Jens Meilleur (2); 11:28 - John Quenneville (5); 19:07 - pp - en - Richard Nejezchleb (5)		Third period	No scoring
Jordan Papirny (49 saves / 51 shots)		Goalie stats	Tristan Jarry (26 saves / 30 shots)

April 11	Edmonton Oil Kings	5 – 1	Brandon Wheat Kings	Rexall Place	Recap
15:26 - Henrik Samuelsson (2); 17:11 - Brett Pollock (5); 17:34 - Reid Petryk (1)		First period	No scoring
No scoring		Second period	No scoring
8:44 - Cody Corbett (4); 11:09 - pp - Mitch Moroz (4)		Third period	Eric Roy (1) - pp - 2:55
Tristan Jarry (19 saves / 20 shots)		Goalie stats	Jordan Papirny (33 saves / 38 shots)

Edmonton wins series 4 – 1

==== (4) Medicine Hat Tigers vs. (6) Kootenay Ice ====
April 5	Medicine Hat Tigers	2 – 4	Kootenay Ice	Medicine Hat Arena	Recap
7:59 - Trevor Cox (4)		First period	Austin Vetterl (2) - 1:49
4:38 - Cole Sanford (3)		Second period	Jon Martin (1) - 8:33
No scoring		Third period	Rinat Valiev (1) - 13:08; Jagger Dirk (3) - en - 19:22
Marek Langhamer (39 saves / 42 shots)		Goalie stats	Mackenzie Skapski (28 saves / 30 shots)

April 6	Medicine Hat Tigers	5 – 2	Kootenay Ice	Medicine Hat Arena	Recap
2:54 - Steven Owre (1)		First period	Levi Cable (3) - 6:49; Jagger Dirk (4) - 12:14
5:07 - Curtis Valk (5)		Second period	No scoring
6:14 - Curtis Valk (6); 17:01 - Steven Owre (2); 18:10 - en - Trevor Cox (5)		Third period	No scoring
Marek Langhamer (22 saves / 24 shots)		Goalie stats	Mackenzie Skapski (32 saves / 36 shots)

April 9	Kootenay Ice	3 – 1	Medicine Hat Tigers	Western Financial Place	Recap
No scoring		First period	No scoring
9:03 - Levi Cable (4)		Second period	No scoring
16:38 - sh - Levi Cable (5); 19:09 - en - Levi Cable (6)		Third period	Curtis Valk (7) - 7:40
Mackenzie Skapski (39 saves / 40 shots)		Goalie stats	Marek Langhamer (27 saves / 29 shots)

April 10	Kootenay Ice	7 – 4	Medicine Hat Tigers	Western Financial Place	Recap
2:24 - pp - Jaedon Descheneau (8)		First period	Chad Labelle (2) - 8:11
16:26 - Luke Philp (5)		Second period	Dylan Bredo (1) - pp - 13:09; Miles Koules (2) - 14:56; Curtis Valk (8) - 16:08
12:16 - Sam Reinhart (6); 15:45 - Jaedon Descheneau (9); 17:54 - Jaedon Descheneau (10); 19:10 - en - Zach Franko (6); 19:50 - en - Kyle O'Connor (1)		Third period	No scoring
Mackenzie Skapski (14 saves / 18 shots); Wyatt Hoflin (21 saves / 21 shots)		Goalie stats	Marek Langhamer (27 saves / 32 shots)

April 12	Medicine Hat Tigers	9 – 2	Kootenay Ice	Medicine Hat Arena	Recap
13:29 - Cole Sanford (4)		First period	Levi Cable (7) - sh - 7:03
13:29 - Cole Sanford (5); 15:06 - Chad Butcher (4)		Second period	Landon Peel (1) - 0:49
5:43 - pp - Cole Sanford (6); 5:56 - Miles Koules (3); 7:18 - Curtis Valk (9); 10:46 - Cole Sanford (7); 15:13 - sh - Trevor Cox (6); 19:31 - pp - Chad Labelle (3)		Third period	No scoring
Marek Langhamer (23 saves / 25 shots)		Goalie stats	Wyatt Hoflin (44 saves / 53 shots)

April 14	Kootenay Ice	1 – 2	Medicine Hat Tigers	Western Financial Place	Recap
No scoring		First period	Miles Koules (4) - 8:10
No scoring		Second period	No scoring
15:46 - Jon Martin (2)		Third period	Curtis Valk (10) - 19:24
Mackenzie Skapski (28 saves / 30 shots)		Goalie stats	Marek Langhamer (26 saves / 27 shots)

April 16	Medicine Hat Tigers	4 – 1	Kootenay Ice	Medicine Hat Arena	Recap
6:44 - Steven Owre (3)		First period	Landon Peel (2) - 0:51
No scoring		Second period	No scoring
0:11 - Trevor Cox (7); 11:19 - Trevor Cox (8); 17:49 - en - Cole Sanford (8)		Third period	No scoring
Marek Langhamer (43 saves / 44 shots)		Goalie stats	Mackenzie Skapski (24 saves / 27 shots)

Medicine Hat wins series 4 – 3

=== Western Conference ===
==== (1) Kelowna Rockets vs. (4) Seattle Thunderbirds ====
April 3	Kelowna Rockets	6 – 2	Seattle Thunderbirds	Prospera Place	Recap
2:16 - Cole Linaker (2); 4:32 - pp - Rourke Chartier (4); 19:42 - pp - Damon Severson (1)		First period	Mathew Barzal (1) - 7:44
13:04 - pp - Ryan Olsen (2); 19:49 - Madison Bowey (2)		Second period	Alexander Delnov (2) - 3:07
0:24 - Damon Severson (2)		Third period	No scoring
Jordon Cooke (23 saves / 25 shots)		Goalie stats	Taran Kozun (30 saves / 36 shots)

April 5	Kelowna Rockets	6 – 3	Seattle Thunderbirds	Prospera Place	Recap
8:00 - Riley Stadel (1); 11:46 - Nick Merkley (1)		First period	Roberts Lipsbergs (2) - 14:03; Scott Eansor (4) - 16:12
3:12 - pp - Damon Severson (3); 4:46 - Cole Linaker (3); 14:01 - Rourke Chartier (5)		Second period	No scoring
18:03 - en - Tyrell Goulbourne (1)		Third period	Alexander Delnov (3) - 2:49
Jordon Cooke (36 saves / 39 shots)		Goalie stats	Taran Kozun (24 saves / 29 shots)

April 8	Seattle Thunderbirds	4 – 5	Kelowna Rockets	ShoWare Center	Recap
No scoring		First period	Ryan Olsen (3) - pp - 18:39; Tyrell Goulbourne (2) - 19:03
4:12 - Ethan Bear (1)		Second period	Tyson Baillie (2) - 7:23; Madison Bowey (3) - 9:54
1:44 - Adam Henry (1); 7:21 - Justin Hickman (2); 18:43 - Alexander Delnov (4)		Third period	Justin Kirkland (3) - pp - 6:07
Taran Kozun (27 saves / 32 shots)		Goalie stats	Jordon Cooke (28 saves / 32 shots)

April 9	Seattle Thunderbirds	2 – 5	Kelowna Rockets	ShoWare Center	Recap
14:22 - pp - Ethan Bear (2)		First period	No scoring
No scoring		Second period	Damon Severson (4) - 16:11; Cole Linaker (4) - 18:14
15:12 - Sam McKechnie (1)		Third period	Marek Tvrdoň (5) - 12:46; Tyson Baillie (3) - pp - 15:00; Nick Merkley (2) - pp - en - 19:33
Taran Kozun (42 saves / 46 shots)		Goalie stats	Jordon Cooke (42 saves / 44 shots)

Kelowna wins series 4 – 0

==== (2) Portland Winterhawks vs. (3) Victoria Royals ====
April 4	Portland Winterhawks	8 – 2	Victoria Royals	Moda Center	Recap
8:53 - Chase De Leo (2); 13:15 - Brendan Leipsic (6)		First period	No scoring
3:11 - Nic Petan (2); 5:06 - pp - Oliver Bjorkstrand (5); 12:01 - Matt Dumba (1); 16:01 - Oliver Bjorkstrand (6)		Second period	Taylor Crunk (1) - 2:32; Brandon Magee (2) - pp - 17:13
10:17 - pp - Derrick Pouliot (2); 11:04 - pp - Matt Dumba (2)		Third period	No scoring
Brendan Burke (25 saves / 27 shots)		Goalie stats	Patrik Polívka (9 saves / 12 shots); Coleman Vollrath (18 saves / 23 shots)

April 5	Portland Winterhawks	6 – 3	Victoria Royals	Moda Center	Recap
3:55 - Nic Petan (3); 4:10 - Anton Cederholm (1)		First period	Steven Hodges (1) - 2:03; Austin Carroll (4) - pp - 19:05
10:08 - pp - Derrick Pouliot (3); 11:45 - pp - Oliver Bjorkstrand (7)		Second period	Steven Hodges (2) - 7:36
1:40 - Oliver Bjorkstrand (8); 15:21 - Derrick Pouliot (4)		Third period	No scoring
Brendan Burke (22 saves / 25 shots)		Goalie stats	Patrik Polívka (38 saves / 44 shots)

April 7	Victoria Royals	2 – 1	Portland Winterhawks	Save-On-Foods Memorial Centre	Recap
2:49 - pp - Brandon Magee (3); 9:24 - pp - Austin Carroll (5)		First period	No scoring
No scoring		Second period	No scoring
No scoring		Third period	Taylor Leier (3) - 19:46
Patrik Polívka (38 saves / 39 shots)		Goalie stats	Brendan Burke (25 saves / 27 shots)

April 8	Victoria Royals	3 – 4	Portland Winterhawks	Save-On-Foods Memorial Centre	Recap
6:39 - Tyler Soy (2)		First period	Adam Rossignol (1) - 8:06
17:11 - sh - Taylor Crunk (2)		Second period	Brendan Leipsic (7) - pp - 12:18
0:07 - pp - Steven Hodges (3)		Third period	Brendan Leipsic (8) - 1:33; Chase De Leo (3) - 8:05
Patrik Polívka (34 saves / 38 shots)		Goalie stats	Brendan Burke (27 saves / 30 shots)

April 10	Portland Winterhawks	5 – 1	Victoria Royals	Moda Center	Recap
13:46 - pp - Taylor Leier (4); 19:26 - Adam de Champlain (2)		First period	No scoring
10:31 - Oliver Bjorkstrand (9)		Second period	Steven Hodges (4) - pp - 15:11
12:22 - Chase De Leo (4); 17:57 - pp - Chase De Leo (5)		Third period	No scoring
Brendan Burke (31 saves / 32 shots)		Goalie stats	Patrik Polívka (35 saves / 40 shots)

Portland wins series 4 – 1

== Conference Finals ==
=== Eastern Conference ===
==== (1) Edmonton Oil Kings vs. (4) Medicine Hat Tigers ====
April 18	Edmonton Oil Kings	8 – 3	Medicine Hat Tigers	Rexall Place	Recap
0:32 - Curtis Lazar (4); 1:06 - Cody Corbett (5)		First period	No scoring
2:41 - Dysin Mayo (3); 4:21 - Brett Pollock (6); 4:33 - Cody Corbett (6); 7:44 - Griffin Reinhart (2); 9:03 - Luke Bertolucci (4)		Second period	Curtis Valk (11) - 9:48
15:43 - Brandon Baddock (1)		Third period	Curtis Valk (12) - pp - 4:47; Alex Mowbray (1) - 17:54
Tristan Jarry (28 saves / 31 shots)		Goalie stats	Marek Langhamer (17 saves / 22 shots); Nick Schneider (5 saves / 8 shots)

April 20	Edmonton Oil Kings	3 – 1	Medicine Hat Tigers	Rexall Place	Recap
No scoring		First period	No scoring
0:34 - pp - Curtis Lazar (5); 10:47 - sh - Curtis Lazar (6)		Second period	Chad Butcher (5) - pp - 12:14
19:21 - en - Edgars Kulda (5)		Third period	No scoring
Tristan Jarry (32 saves / 33 shots)		Goalie stats	Marek Langhamer (43 saves / 45 shots)

April 22	Medicine Hat Tigers	2 – 1	Edmonton Oil Kings	Medicine Hat Arena	Recap
6:25 - Tommy Vannelli (2)		First period	Curtis Lazar (7) - 5:14
17:22 - Chad Labelle (4)		Second period	No scoring
No scoring		Third period	No scoring
Marek Langhamer (43 saves / 44 shots)		Goalie stats	Tristan Jarry (19 saves / 21 shots)

April 23	Medicine Hat Tigers	1 – 4	Edmonton Oil Kings	Medicine Hat Arena	Recap
No scoring		First period	No scoring
No scoring		Second period	Griffin Reinhart (3) - 7:16; Brett Pollock (7) - pp - 19:53
18:42 - pp - Cole Sanford (9)		Third period	Luke Bertolucci (5) - 6:52; Brett Pollock (8) - 16:23
Marek Langhamer (26 saves / 30 shots)		Goalie stats	Tristan Jarry (22 saves / 23 shots)

April 26	Edmonton Oil Kings	4 – 3	Medicine Hat Tigers	Rexall Place	Recap
No scoring		First period	Jacob Doty (1) - 8:49
4:18 - pp - Edgars Kulda (6); 14:03 - Brett Pollock (9); 17:14 - Mads Eller (2)		Second period	Cole Sanford (10) - 10:03
14:22 - Brett Pollock (10)		Third period	Cole Sanford (11) - 1:57
Tristan Jarry (16 saves / 19 shots)		Goalie stats	Marek Langhamer (48 saves / 52 shots)

Edmonton wins series 4 – 1

=== Western Conference ===
==== (1) Kelowna Rockets vs. (2) Portland Winterhawks ====
April 18	Kelowna Rockets	5 – 4	Portland Winterhawks	Prospera Place	Recap
13:08 - Tyson Baillie (4); 19:33 - Madison Bowey (4)		First period	Oliver Bjorkstrand (10) - 0:33; Oliver Bjorkstrand (11) - pp - 5:49; Chase De Leo (6) - pp - 12:19
16:26 - Rourke Chartier (6)		Second period	Keoni Texeira (1) - 15:43
4:17 - pp - Justin Kirkland (4); 5:59 - Jesse Lees (1)		Third period	No scoring
Jordon Cooke (22 saves / 26 shots)		Goalie stats	Brendan Burke (31 saves / 36 shots)

April 19	Kelowna Rockets	3 – 5	Portland Winterhawks	Prospera Place	Recap
12:05 - pp - Nick Merkley (3); 13:37 - pp - Riley Stadel (2)		First period	No scoring
1:33 - Madison Bowey (5)		Second period	Dominic Turgeon (1) - 0:24; Nic Petan (4) - pp - 9:54; Oliver Bjorkstrand (12) - 11:51; Brendan Leipsic (9) - 12:04
No scoring		Third period	Alex Schoenborn (3) - 8:45
Jordon Cooke (48 saves / 53 shots)		Goalie stats	Brendan Burke (9 saves / 12 shots); Corbin Boes (15 saves / 15 shots)

April 22	Portland Winterhawks	4 – 3	OT	Kelowna Rockets	Moda Center	Recap
No scoring		First period		Riley Stadel (3) - 2:22
6:26 - Oliver Bjorkstrand (13)		Second period		Cole Martin (1) - 6:39
17:01 - pp - Oliver Bjorkstrand (14); 18:42 - Brendan Leipsic (10)		Third period		Ryan Olsen (4) - 14:50
10:00 - Taylor Leier (5)		First overtime period		No scoring
Corbin Boes (30 saves / 33 shots)		Goalie stats		Jordon Cooke (61 saves / 65 shots)

April 23	Portland Winterhawks	5 – 1	Kelowna Rockets	Moda Center	Recap
18:48 - pp - Nic Petan (5)		First period	Nick Merkley (4) - 13:28
10:15 - pp - Nic Petan (6); 11:29 - sh - Oliver Bjorkstrand (15); 16:53 - pp - Nic Petan (7)		Second period	No scoring
17:48 - en - Paul Bittner (2)		Third period	No scoring
Corbin Boes (31 saves / 32 shots)		Goalie stats	Jordon Cooke (31 saves / 35 shots)

April 25	Kelowna Rockets	3 – 7	Portland Winterhawks	Prospera Place	Recap
No scoring		First period	Dominic Turgeon (2) - 13:12; Brendan Leipsic (11) - pp - 15:45
8:29 - pp - Tyson Baillie (5); 10:48 - pp - Jesse Lees (2)		Second period	Taylor Leier (6) - pp - 0:24
11:27 - Justin Kirkland (5)		Third period	Matt Dumba (3) - 0:59; Brendan Leipsic (12) - pp - 2:56; Chase De Leo (7) - 6:33; Keegan Iverson (2) - 8:22
Jordon Cooke (34 saves / 41 shots)		Goalie stats	Corbin Boes (35 saves / 38 shots)

Portland wins series 4 – 1

== WHL Championship ==
=== (W2) Portland Winterhawks vs. (E1) Edmonton Oil Kings ===
May 3	Portland Winterhawks	5 – 2	Edmonton Oil Kings	Moda Center	Recap
2:50 - Keegan Iverson (3); 18:07 - Paul Bittner (3); 19:04 - Chase De Leo (8)		First period	No scoring
19:23 - pp - Matt Dumba (4)		Second period	Brett Pollock (11) - 0:20; Henrik Samuelsson (3) - 2:20
3:41 - Paul Bittner (4)		Third period	No scoring
Corbin Boes (31 saves / 33 shots)		Goalie stats	Tristan Jarry (31 saves / 36 shots)

May 4	Portland Winterhawks	3 – 1	Edmonton Oil Kings	Moda Center	Recap
2:12 - Chase De Leo (9); 3:14 - Brendan Leipsic (13)		First period	No scoring
4:32 - Paul Bittner (5)		Second period	No scoring
No scoring		Third period	Henrik Samuelsson (4) - pp - 13:32
Corbin Boes (28 saves / 29 shots)		Goalie stats	Tristan Jarry (29 saves / 32 shots)

May 6	Edmonton Oil Kings	3 – 2	Portland Winterhawks	Rexall Place	Recap
No scoring		First period	Chase De Leo (10) - 2:38; Matt Dumba (5) - 3:30
4:11 - pp - Henrik Samuelsson (5); 11:04 - Luke Bertolucci (6)		Second period	No scoring
13:13 - Edgars Kulda (7)		Third period	No scoring
Tristan Jarry (35 saves / 37 shots)		Goalie stats	Corbin Boes (35 saves / 38 shots)

May 7	Edmonton Oil Kings	2 – 0	Portland Winterhawks	Rexall Place	Recap
No scoring		First period	No scoring
8:40 - Mitchell Moroz (5)		Second period	No scoring
6:17 - Curtis Lazar (8)		Third period	No scoring
Tristan Jarry (26 saves / 26 shots)		Goalie stats	Corbin Boes (35 saves / 37 shots)

May 9	Portland Winterhawks	2 – 3	Edmonton Oil Kings	Moda Center	Recap
15:28 - Paul Bittner (6)		First period	Edgars Kulda (8) - pp - 18:27
No scoring		Second period	Griffin Reinhart (4) - 2:11; Henrik Samuelsson (6) - 7:39
18:15 - Matt Dumba (6)		Third period	No scoring
Corbin Boes (27 saves / 30 shots)		Goalie stats	Tristan Jarry (37 saves / 39 shots)

May 11	Edmonton Oil Kings	5 – 6	OT	Portland Winterhawks	Rexall Place	Recap
4:48 - Henrik Samuelsson (7); 6:14 - Henrik Samuelsson (8); 19:09 - Edgars Kulda (9)		First period		No scoring
13:57 - Curtis Lazar (9); 14:46 - Edgars Kulda (10)		Second period		Matt Dumba (7) - pp - 3:25; Anton Cederholm (2) - 13:12
No scoring		Third period		Matt Dumba (8) - pp - 2:57; Keoni Texeira (2) - 6:09; Derrick Pouliot (5) - 11:14
No scoring		First overtime period		Keegan Iverson (4) - 7:23
Tristan Jarry (35 saves / 41 shots)		Goalie stats		Corbin Boes (7 saves / 10 shots); Brendan Burke (28 saves / 30 shots)

May 12	Portland Winterhawks	2 – 4	Edmonton Oil Kings	Moda Center	Recap
4:42 - Oliver Bjorkstrand (16)		First period	No scoring
No scoring		Second period	Mitchell Moroz (6) - 3:50; Curtis Lazar (10) - sh - 9:02; Reid Petryk (2) - 9:42; Mads Eller (3) - 17:17
16:38 - pp - Brendan Leipsic (14)		Third period	No scoring
Brendan Burke (29 saves / 33 shots)		Goalie stats	Tristan Jarry (32 saves / 34 shots)

Edmonton wins series 4 – 3

== Playoff scoring leaders ==
Note: GP = Games played; G = Goals; A = Assists; Pts = Points; PIM = Penalty minutes

Player	Team	GP	G	A	Pts	PIM
Oliver Bjorkstrand	Portland Winterhawks	21	16	17	33	8
Brendan Leipsic	Portland Winterhawks	20	14	19	33	49
Derrick Pouliot	Portland Winterhawks	21	5	27	32	13
Nic Petan	Portland Winterhawks	21	7	21	28	38
Taylor Leier	Portland Winterhawks	21	6	20	26	10
Cole Sanford	Medicine Hat Tigers	18	11	13	24	16
Trevor Cox	Medicine Hat Tigers	17	8	15	23	12
Henrik Samuelsson	Edmonton Oil Kings	21	8	15	23	51
Sam Reinhart	Kootenay Ice	13	6	17	23	2
Edgars Kulda	Edmonton Oil Kings	21	10	12	22	12
Curtis Lazar	Edmonton Oil Kings	21	10	12	22	12

== Playoff leading goaltenders ==
Note: GP = Games played; Mins = Minutes played; W = Wins; L = Losses; GA = Goals Allowed; SO = Shutouts; SV& = Save percentage; GAA = Goals against average

Player	Team	GP	Mins	W	L	GA	SO	Sv%	GAA
Eetu Laurikainen	Swift Current Broncos	6	359	2	4	13	0	.941	2.17
Tristan Jarry	Edmonton Oil Kings	21	1261	16	5	46	3	.925	2.19
Corbin Boes	Portland Winterhawks	10	543	6	3	21	0	.929	2.32
Marek Langhamer	Medicine Hat Tigers	18	1071	9	9	42	0	.934	2.35
Brendan Burke	Portland Winterhawks	13	723	9	3	32	1	.907	2.66

== WHL awards ==
Scotty Munro Memorial Trophy	Regular season champions	Kelowna Rockets	
Four Broncos Memorial Trophy	Player of the Year	Sam Reinhart	Kootenay Ice
Bob Clarke Trophy	Top Scorer	Mitch Holmberg	Spokane Chiefs
Bill Hunter Memorial Trophy	Top Defenseman	Derrick Pouliot	Portland Winterhawks
Jim Piggott Memorial Trophy	Rookie of the Year	Nick Merkley	Kelowna Rockets
Del Wilson Trophy	Top Goaltender	Jordon Cooke	Kelowna Rockets
WHL Plus-Minus Award	Top Plus-Minus Rating	Ashton Sautner	Edmonton Oil Kings
Brad Hornung Trophy	Most Sportsmanlike Player	Sam Reinhart	Kootenay Ice
Daryl K. (Doc) Seaman Trophy	Scholastic Player of the Year	Nelson Nogier	Saskatoon Blades
Jim Donlevy Memorial Trophy	Scholastic team of the Year	Calgary Hitmen	
Dunc McCallum Memorial Trophy	Coach of the Year	Dave Lowry	Victoria Royals
Lloyd Saunders Memorial Trophy	Executive of the Year	Cam Hope	Victoria Royals
Allen Paradice Memorial Trophy	Top Official	Nathan Wieler	
St. Clair Group Trophy	Marketing/Public Relations Award	Seattle Thunderbirds	
Doug Wickenheiser Memorial Trophy	Humanitarian of the Year	Sam Fioretti	Moose Jaw Warriors
WHL Playoff MVP	WHL Finals Most Valuable Player	Griffin Reinhart	Edmonton Oil Kings
Professional Hockey Achievement; Academic Recipient	Alumni Achievement Awards	Mike Modano	

=== All-Star teams ===
==== Eastern Conference ====
First Team		Pos.	Second Team	
Player	Team	Pos.	Player	Team
Tristan Jarry	Edmonton Oil Kings	G	Patrik Bartosak	Red Deer Rebels
Josh Morrissey	Prince Albert Raiders	D	Griffin Reinhart	Edmonton Oil Kings
Ryan Pulock no	Brandon Wheat Kings	D	Julius Honka	Swift Current Broncos
Sam Reinhart	Kootenay Ice	F	Curtis Valk	Medicine Hat Tigers
Leon Draisaitl	Prince Albert Raiders	F	Jaedon Descheneau	Kootenay Ice
Curtis Lazar	Edmonton Oil Kings	F	Chandler Stephenson	Regina Pats

==== Western Conference ====
First Team		Pos.	Second Team	
Player	Team	Pos.	Player	Team
Jordon Cooke	Kelowna Rockets	G	Eric Comrie	Tri-City Americans
Derrick Pouliot	Portland Winterhawks	D	Damon Severson	Kelowna Rockets
Shea Theodore	Seattle Thunderbirds	D	Madison Bowey	Kelowna Rockets
Nic Petan	Portland Winterhawks	F	Joshua Winquist	Everett Silvertips
Mitch Holmberg	Spokane Chiefs	F	Todd Fiddler	Prince George Cougars
Oliver Bjorkstrand	Portland Winterhawks	F	Mike Aviani	Spokane Chiefs

== See also ==
- List of WHL seasons
- 2013–14 OHL season
- 2013–14 QMJHL season
- 2014 in ice hockey
- 2013 in ice hockey

Preceded by 2012–13 WHL season	WHL seasons	Succeeded by 2014–15 WHL season
