= Meilleur =

Meilleur (French for better) may refer to:

- Meilleurs Bay, community of Laurentian Hills, Ontario

== People ==
- Briane Meilleur (born 1992), Canadian curler
- Hubert Meilleur, Canadian politician
- Jean-Baptiste Meilleur (1796–1878), Canadian doctor, educator and political figure
- Jens Meilleur (born 1993), Canadian-German ice hockey player
- Madeleine Meilleur (b. 1948), Canadian politician
- Marie-Louise Meilleur (1880–1998), French Canadian supercentenarian
- Vincent Meilleur (* May 6, 1974) is a French ski mountaineer
