= Goulbourne =

Goulbourne is a surname. Notable people with the surname include:

- Elva Goulbourne (born 1980), Jamaican track and field athlete
- Tyrell Goulbourne (born 1994), Canadian ice hockey player
- Stokeley Clevon Goulbourne (born 1996), American rapper and songwriter
