= Mackenzie Skapski =

Canadian ice hockey player

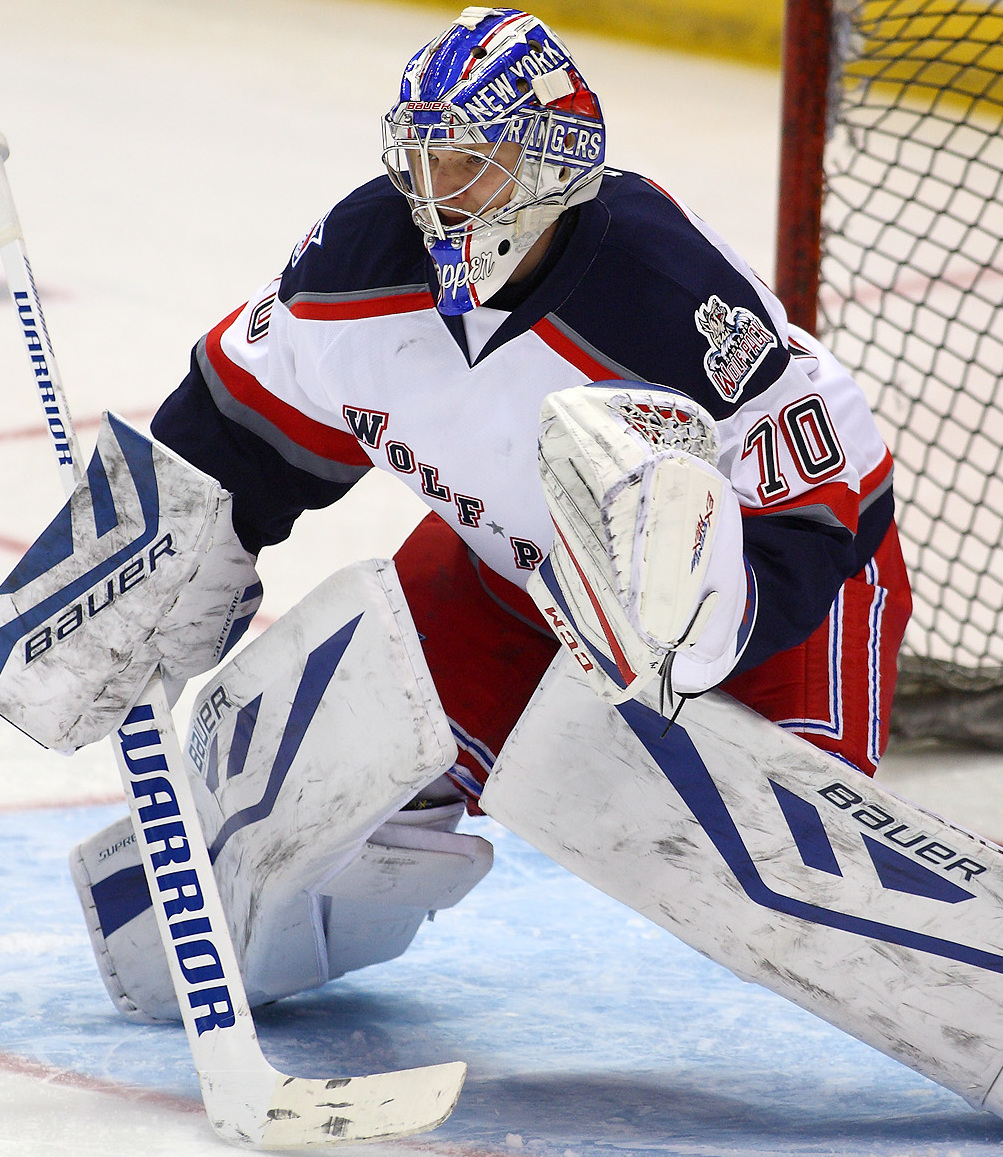
- Skapski with the Hartford Wolf Pack during the 2015–16 season
- Born: June 15, 1994 (age 32) Abbotsford, British Columbia, Canada
- Height: 6 ft 3 in (191 cm)
- Weight: 192 lb (87 kg; 13 st 10 lb)
- Position: Goaltender
- Caught: Left
- Played for: New York Rangers; HKM Zvolen
- NHL draft: 170th overall, 2013; New York Rangers
- Playing career: 2014–2020

Mackenzie Skapski (born June 15, 1994) is a Canadian former professional ice hockey goaltender and goaltending coach who last played for HKM Zvolen in the Slovak Extraliga. He has formerly played for the New York Rangers in the National Hockey League (NHL).

== Playing career ==
Skapski was born in Abbotsford, British Columbia. While playing Major Midget for the Fraser Valley Bruins as a 15-year-old, Skapski suffered serious injuries which threatened his career when the team bus crashed on December 11, 2009. He suffered a broken nose and orbital bone and required surgery to relieve a blood clot near his brain. Although able to play again in less than a year, the injuries delayed his career progression.

Skapski played junior hockey for the Kootenay Ice of the Western Hockey League (WHL). He was drafted by the New York Rangers in the sixth round of the 2013 NHL entry draft. He had been rated as the 17th best draft-eligible goalie in North America by Central Scouting. He previously played minor ice hockey in his hometown of Abbotsford, British Columbia.

Skapski began the 2014-15 season with the Greenville Road Warriors of the ECHL but was called up to the Hartford Wolf Pack of the American Hockey League (AHL) after playing just one game to replace Jason Missiaen, who was demoted to Greenville. He made his AHL debut on October 24 and recorded his first shutout on October 26. He played well enough at Hartford to remain with the team until his promotion to the Rangers, with a 2.38 goals against average and a .914 save percentage in 24 games. Ranger staff felt he was making "good progression" at Hartford prior to his promotion. According to sportswriter Paul Doyle, Skapski's "even demeanor" was key to his successful transition to the AHL.

He was called up from Hartford on February 4, 2015, when the Rangers' starting goaltender Henrik Lundqvist went down with a damaged blood vessel in his neck. His first appearance with the Rangers was as the backup to Cam Talbot in a game against the Boston Bruins. He made his NHL debut on February 20, 2015 against the Buffalo Sabres, in which he made 24 saves en route to a 3-1 win. Skapski earned his first NHL shutout in his second NHL game, also against the Sabres, in a game on March 14, 2015. When Lundqvist returned from his injury, Skapski was returned to the Wolf Pack on March 25, 2015.

At the conclusion of his entry-level contract, Skapski became a free agent after he was not tendered a qualifying offer by the Rangers. On September 25, 2017, he agreed to an AHL invite to attend the Toronto Marlies 2017 training camp. On November 3, 2017, he was belatedly signed to a one-year AHL contract with the Marlies for the 2017–18 season. He was immediately re-assigned to ECHL affiliate, the Orlando Solar Bears.

As a free agent in the following off-season, Skapski opted to embark on a European career, agreeing to a one-year deal with the Slovak club HKM Zvolen of the Slovak Extraliga on July 18, 2018.

On December 18, 2020, Skapski was announced as the new goaltending coach for the Chilliwack Chiefs of the British Columbia Hockey League.

== International play ==
He represented Canada Pacific in the 2011 World U-17 Hockey Challenge, winning a bronze medal.

== Career statistics ==
=== Regular season and playoffs ===
			Regular season									Playoffs
Season	Team	League	GP	W	L	T/OT	MIN	GA	SO	GAA	SV%	GP	W	L	MIN	GA	SO	GAA	SV%
2010–11	Kootenay Ice	WHL	4	3	1	0	247	13	0	3.16	.882	—	—	—	—	—	—	—	—
2011–12	Kootenay Ice	WHL	19	9	6	2	1020	53	0	3.12	.890	—	—	—	—	—	—	—	—
2012–13	Kootenay Ice	WHL	65	34	25	1	3642	169	7	2.78	.910	5	1	4	258	17	0	3.95	.892
2013–14	Kootenay Ice	WHL	53	28	20	4	3018	136	1	2.70	.916	10	3	5	540	34	0	3.78	.882
2014–15	Greenville Road Warriors	ECHL	1	0	1	0	57	3	0	3.17	.906	—	—	—	—	—	—	—	—
2014–15	Hartford Wolf Pack	AHL	28	15	8	1	1522	61	3	2.40	.914	2	0	1	77	7	0	5.43	.821
2014–15	New York Rangers	NHL	2	2	0	0	119	1	1	0.50	.978	—	—	—	—	—	—	—	—
2015–16	Hartford Wolf Pack	AHL	13	4	7	0	708	36	0	3.05	.902	—	—	—	—	—	—	—	—
2015–16	Greenville Swamp Rabbits	ECHL	27	5	14	5	1544	84	1	3.26	.901	—	—	—	—	—	—	—	—
2016–17	Hartford Wolf Pack	AHL	13	2	8	0	660	52	0	4.73	.856	—	—	—	—	—	—	—	—
2016–17	Greenville Swamp Rabbits	ECHL	33	18	11	0	1884	106	1	3.38	.904	1	0	1	60	6	0	6.00	.829
2017–18	Orlando Solar Bears	ECHL	33	12	14	3	1783	90	2	3.03	.906	3	1	1	127	9	0	4.25	.877
2018–19	HKM Zvolen	Slovak	34	—	—	—	1917	68	0	2.13	.928	12	7	5	—	—	—	1.67	.932
NHL totals			2	2	0	0	119	1	1	0.50	.978	—	—	—	—	—	—	—	—

=== International ===
Year	Team	Event	Result	GP	W	L	OT	MIN	GA	SO	GAA	SV%
2011	Canada Pacific	U17	3rd place, bronze medalist(s)	4	—	—	—	—	—	—	3.30	.878
Junior totals				4	—	—	—	—	—	—	3.30	.878
