= Paul Bittner =

American ice hockey player (born 1996)

- Born: November 4, 1996 (age 29) Crookston, Minnesota, U.S.
- Height: 6 ft 4 in (193 cm)
- Weight: 206 lb (93 kg; 14 st 10 lb)
- Position: Left wing
- Shot: Left
- Played for: Cleveland Monsters; Väsby IK; Mora IK; Düsseldorfer EG; Stavanger Oilers
- NHL draft: 38th overall, 2015; Columbus Blue Jackets
- Playing career: 2016–2023

Paul Bittner (born November 4, 1996) is an American professional ice hockey Winger. He most recently played for Düsseldorfer EG of the Deutsche Eishockey Liga (DEL). Bittner has played major junior hockey with the Portland Winterhawks of the Western Hockey League (WHL). Bittner was rated as a top prospect who was widely projected to be a first round selection in the 2015 NHL entry draft. He was, however, selected 38th overall, in the second round by the Columbus Blue Jackets in the 2015 NHL entry draft.

== Playing career ==
In 2012, Bittner joined the Portland Winterhawks of the Western Hockey League. and in his first year he helped the Winterhawks capture the Ed Chynoweth Cup as the 2012–13 WHL Champions. During the 2014–15 season he was rewarded for his outstanding play when he was selected to skate in the 2015 CHL/NHL Top Prospects Game.

On August 20, 2015, Bittner was signed to a three-year entry-level contract with the Columbus Blue Jackets. After attending the Blue Jackets training camp, Bittner was returned to his junior club, the Winterhawks for the 2015–16 season. Hampered by injury, Bittner was limited to just 25 games with Portland, recording 21 points. Upon the completion of the Winterhawks season and a return to health, Bittner was reassigned to AHL affiliate, the Lake Erie Monsters, on April 13, 2016, to make his professional debut to end the regular season.

Following his fourth season within the Blue Jackets organization, Bittner as a restricted free agent was not tendered a qualifying offer, releasing him to free agency.

Bittner played two seasons in the Swedish HockeyAllsvenskan with Väsby IK and Mora IK, until he left during the 2021–22 season and opted to sign for the remainder of the season with German top flight club, Düsseldorfer EG of the DEL, on November 26, 2021.

== International play ==
Bittner competed with Team USA at the 2013 Ivan Hlinka Memorial Tournament.

== Career statistics ==
=== Regular season and playoffs ===
			Regular season					Playoffs
Season	Team	League	GP	G	A	Pts	PIM	GP	G	A	Pts	PIM
2011–12	Crookston High	USHS	25	15	6	21	10	1	0	0	0	0
2012–13	Portland Winterhawks	WHL	45	12	11	23	12	19	0	0	0	0
2013–14	Portland Winterhawks	WHL	63	22	27	49	27	21	6	6	12	11
2014–15	Portland Winterhawks	WHL	66	34	37	71	52	17	4	8	12	6
2015–16	Portland Winterhawks	WHL	25	10	11	21	21	—	—	—	—	—
2015–16	Lake Erie Monsters	AHL	2	0	0	0	0	—	—	—	—	—
2016–17	Cleveland Monsters	AHL	31	0	3	3	10	—	—	—	—	—
2017–18	Cleveland Monsters	AHL	52	9	9	18	17	—	—	—	—	—
2018–19	Cleveland Monsters	AHL	50	9	22	31	21	5	0	0	0	0
2019–20	Cleveland Monsters	AHL	55	7	9	16	41	—	—	—	—	—
2020–21	Väsby IK	Allsv	14	6	7	13	16	—	—	—	—	—
2021–22	Mora IK	Allsv	8	1	3	4	2	—	—	—	—	—
2021–22	Düsseldorfer EG	DEL	29	6	4	10	0	7	0	1	1	0
2022–23	Stavanger Oilers	NOR	21	4	4	8	10	—	—	—	—	—
2022–23	Düsseldorfer EG	DEL	26	3	0	3	8	—	—	—	—	—
AHL totals			190	25	43	68	89	5	0	0	0	0

=== International ===
Year	Team	Event	Result	GP	G	A	Pts	PIM
2013	United States	IH18	2nd place, silver medalist(s)	5	2	1	3	0
Junior totals				5	2	1	3	0

== Awards and honors ==
Honors	Year
Ivan Hlinka Memorial Tournament	2013
CHL/NHL Top Prospects Game	2015
