= Anton Cederholm =

Swedish ice hockey player (born 1995)

- Born: February 21, 1995 (age 31) Helsingborg, Sweden
- Height: 6 ft 2 in (188 cm)
- Weight: 203 lb (92 kg; 14 st 7 lb)
- Position: Defence
- Shot: Left
- Played for: Rögle BK; Utica Comets
- NHL draft: 145th overall, 2013; Vancouver Canucks
- Playing career: 2013–2018

Anton Cederholm (born February 21, 1995) is a Swedish former professional ice hockey defenceman. He last played with the Utica Comets of the American Hockey League (AHL) while under contract as a prospect to the Vancouver Canucks of the National Hockey League (NHL). Cederholm was selected by the Canucks in the 5th round (145th overall) of the 2013 NHL entry draft.

== Playing career ==
Cederholm made his Elitserien debut playing with Rögle BK during the 2012–13 Elitserien season.

After the first season of his entry-level contract with the Vancouver Canucks, in which he spent the 2015–16 campaign with ECHL affiliate, the Kalamazoo Wings, Cederholm was loaned back to Rögle BK to further develop for the 2016–17 season on July 25, 2016.

At the conclusion of his entry-level deal with the Canucks, Cederholm was not tendered a qualifying offer by the Canucks and was free to pursue free agency on June 25, 2018.

== Career statistics ==
=== Regular season and playoffs ===
			Regular season					Playoffs
Season	Team	League	GP	G	A	Pts	PIM	GP	G	A	Pts	PIM
2010–11	Rögle BK	J20	2	0	0	0	0	—	—	—	—	—
2011–12	Rögle BK	J20	41	3	5	8	71	—	—	—	—	—
2012–13	Rögle BK	J20	36	5	8	13	64	2	0	0	0	0
2012–13	Rögle BK	SEL	12	0	0	0	6	—	—	—	—	—
2013–14	Portland Winterhawks	WHL	71	4	12	16	95	21	2	3	5	16
2014–15	Portland Winterhawks	WHL	68	9	10	19	84	17	1	1	2	6
2015–16	Kalamazoo Wings	ECHL	69	3	14	17	65	4	0	0	0	0
2016–17	Rögle BK	SHL	8	0	0	0	4	—	—	—	—	—
2016–17	AIK IF	Allsv	33	2	5	7	49	8	0	3	3	10
2017–18	Utica Comets	AHL	12	0	0	0	0	—	—	—	—	—
2017–18	Kalamazoo Wings	ECHL	31	3	7	10	26	—	—	—	—	—
SHL totals			20	0	0	0	10	—	—	—	—	—

=== International ===
Year	Team	Event	Result	GP	G	A	Pts	PIM
2011	Sweden	IH18	2nd place, silver medalist(s)	5	0	0	0	2
2012	Sweden	U17	4th	6	0	0	0	4
2012	Sweden	IH18	3rd place, bronze medalist(s)	5	1	2	3	2
Junior totals				16	1	2	3	8
