= Jaedon Descheneau =

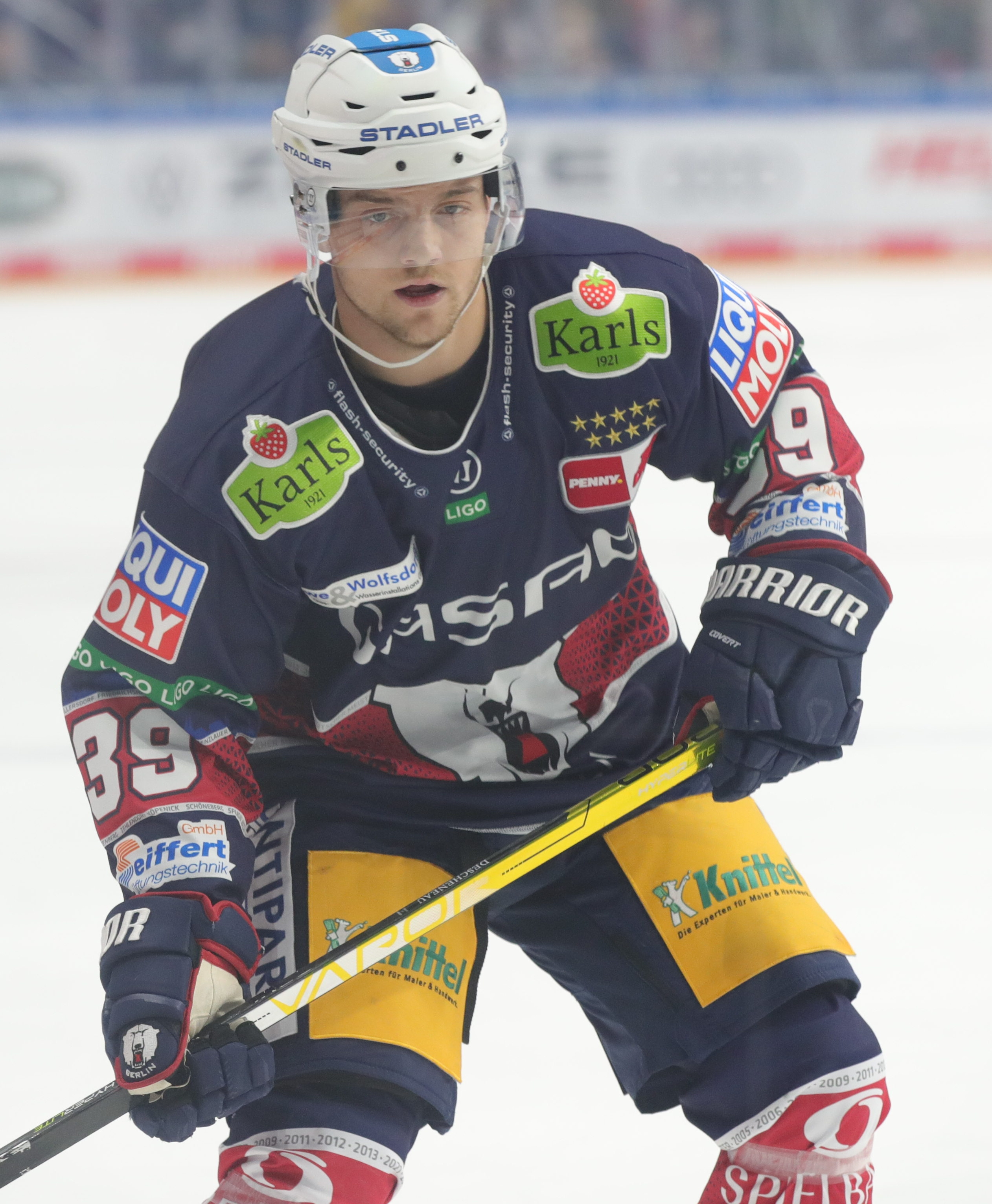
- Descheneau with the Eisbären Berlin in 2023
- Born: 22 February 1995 (age 31) Leduc, Alberta, Canada
- Height: 5 ft 10 in (178 cm)
- Weight: 187 lb (85 kg; 13 st 5 lb)
- Position: Forward
- Shoots: Right
- Slovak team Former teams: HK Dukla Trenčín; Bakersfield Condors; HC Davos; Düsseldorfer EG; Brynäs IF; Malmö Redhawks; TPS; SaiPa; Eisbären Berlin; HK Nitra
- NHL draft: 124th overall, 2014; St. Louis Blues
- Playing career: 2016–present

Jaedon Descheneau (born 22 February 1995) is a Canadian professional ice hockey player. He currently plays in the Slovak Extraliga for HK Dukla Trenčín.

== Career statistics ==
=== Regular season and playoffs ===
			Regular season					Playoffs
Season	Team	League	GP	G	A	Pts	PIM	GP	G	A	Pts	PIM
2008–09	Beaumont Braves U15 AA	AMBAAHL	27	28	39	67	20	—	—	—	—	—
2009–10	Leduc Oil Kings U15 AAA	AMBHL	33	31	46	77	38	6	5	5	10	4
2009–10	Leduc Oil Kings U16 AAA	AMMHL	1	0	0	0	0	—	—	—	—	—
2010–11	Leduc Oil Kings U18 AAA	AMHL	31	15	20	35	40	16	7	10	17	2
2011–12	Kootenay Ice	WHL	54	3	11	14	24	4	0	0	0	0
2012–13	Kootenay Ice	WHL	69	30	48	78	22	5	0	1	1	2
2013–14	Kootenay Ice	WHL	70	44	54	98	54	13	10	10	20	6
2014–15	Kootenay Ice	WHL	70	34	47	81	58	7	5	5	10	4
2015–16	Kootenay Ice	WHL	2	0	1	1	5	—	—	—	—	—
2016–17	Bakersfield Condors	AHL	38	6	9	15	14	—	—	—	—	—
2016–17	Norfolk Admirals	ECHL	26	9	10	19	10	—	—	—	—	—
2017–18	HC Thurgau	SL	41	18	32	50	28	6	4	5	9	8
2017–18	HC Davos	NL	0	0	0	0	0	1	0	0	0	2
2018–19	Düsseldorfer EG	DEL	52	19	32	51	30	7	5	8	13	14
2019–20	Brynäs IF	SHL	46	8	10	18	14	—	—	—	—	—
2020–21	Brynäs IF	SHL	52	10	22	32	36	—	—	—	—	—
2021–22	Malmö Redhawks	SHL	10	1	1	2	4	—	—	—	—	—
2021–22	HC TPS	Liiga	28	4	9	13	8	1	0	0	0	0
2022–23	SaiPa	Liiga	16	3	6	9	8	—	—	—	—	—
2023–24	Eisbären Berlin	DEL	17	5	2	7	28	4	0	0	0	2
2024–25	HK Nitra	Slovak	16	5	9	14	6	20	6	4	10	14
2025–26	HK Dukla Trenčín	Slovak	39	18	22	40	42	—	—	—	—	—
AHL totals			38	6	9	15	14	—	—	—	—	—
SHL totals			108	19	33	52	54	—	—	—	—	—

=== International ===
Year	Team	Event	GP	G	A	Pts	PIM
2012	Canada Pacific U17	WHC-17	5	0	0	0	2
Junior totals			5	0	0	0	2

== Awards and honours ==
Award	Year
DEL
Champions (Eisbären Berlin)	2024
