= Curtis Valk =

Canadian ice hockey player (born 1993)

- Valk in 2026
- Born: February 8, 1993 (age 33) Medicine Hat, Alberta, Canada
- Height: 5 ft 9 in (175 cm)
- Weight: 170 lb (77 kg; 12 st 2 lb)
- Position: Centre
- Shoots: Left
- DEL team Former teams: Schwenninger Wild Wings; Florida Panthers; Barys Nur-Sultan; Avtomobilist Yekaterinburg; HC Lugano
- National team: Kazakhstan
- NHL draft: Undrafted
- Playing career: 2014–present

Curtis Valk (Kazakh: Кертис Вэлк; born February 8, 1993) is a Kazakh Canadian professional ice hockey centre. He is currently playing with Schwenninger Wild Wings in the Deutsche Eishockey Liga (DEL). He has formerly played in the National Hockey League (NHL) with the Florida Panthers.

== Playing career ==
Valk played major junior hockey for his hometown team, the Medicine Hat Tigers in the Western Hockey League (WHL). Valk, who played in the WHL from the 2010–11 season, was rewarded for his outstanding performance during the 2012–13 WHL season by being named to the 2013 WHL East First All-Star Team.

As an undrafted free agent embarking on his first professional season, Valk was invited to participate in the Vancouver Canucks 2014 training camp on September 21, 2014. He was later demoted to AHL affiliate, the Utica Comets, where he signed a one-year contract on October 10, 2014. He was immediately re-assigned to ECHL affiliate, the Kalamazoo Wings to begin the 2014–15 season.

On July 1, 2017, Valk signed as a free agent to a one-year, entry-level contract with the Florida Panthers. During training camp, Valk was re-assigned by the Panthers to begin the 2017–18 season with AHL affiliate, the Springfield Thunderbirds. Through the first 16 games of the season, Valk impressed to lead the team in scoring with 15 points. On November 13, 2017, he received his first recall by the Panthers to the NHL, and made his NHL debut on November 14, 2017. After a solitary game with the Panthers, Valk was returned to the Thunderbirds and played out the season in collecting a career best 62 points in 73 games.

As a restricted free agent with the Panthers, Valk opted to pause his North American career in signing a one-year contract with Kazakhstani club, Barys Astana of the KHL on July 3, 2018.

Following four seasons with Barys, Valk as a dual Kazakhstani citizen left to sign a two-year contract to continue in the KHL with Avtomobilist Yekaterinburg on May 1, 2022.

After splitting the 2025–26 season, between Yekaterinburg and HC Lugano of the Swiss National League (NL), Valk continued his career in Europe by agreeing to a one-year contract with German club, Schwenninger Wild Wings of the DEL, on July 19, 2026.

== Career statistics ==
=== Regular season and playoffs ===
			Regular season					Playoffs
Season	Team	League	GP	G	A	Pts	PIM	GP	G	A	Pts	PIM
2009–10	Brooks Bandits	AJHL	2	0	0	0	0	—	—	—	—	—
2009–10	Medicine Hat Tigers	WHL	4	0	0	0	2	—	—	—	—	—
2010–11	Medicine Hat Tigers	WHL	56	8	9	17	19	15	1	4	5	6
2011–12	Medicine Hat Tigers	WHL	67	24	31	55	35	8	6	4	10	4
2012–13	Medicine Hat Tigers	WHL	71	46	45	91	54	8	3	2	5	4
2013–14	Medicine Hat Tigers	WHL	72	47	45	92	36	18	12	9	21	10
2014–15	Kalamazoo Wings	ECHL	31	11	19	30	12	—	—	—	—	—
2014–15	Utica Comets	AHL	1	0	0	0	0	—	—	—	—	—
2015–16	Utica Comets	AHL	12	2	4	6	2	—	—	—	—	—
2015–16	Kalamazoo Wings	ECHL	30	16	17	33	14	—	—	—	—	—
2016–17	Utica Comets	AHL	75	16	30	46	49	—	—	—	—	—
2017–18	Springfield Thunderbirds	AHL	73	20	42	62	41	—	—	—	—	—
2017–18	Florida Panthers	NHL	1	0	0	0	0	—	—	—	—	—
2018–19	Barys Astana	KHL	50	9	18	27	32	12	1	6	7	6
2019–20	Barys Nur-Sultan	KHL	52	7	12	19	10	5	1	1	2	4
2020–21	Barys Nur-Sultan	KHL	59	9	20	29	67	3	1	1	2	2
2021–22	Barys Nur-Sultan	KHL	47	12	29	41	16	5	1	3	4	2
2022–23	Avtomobilist Yekaterinburg	KHL	56	14	25	39	26	7	4	6	10	8
2023–24	Avtomobilist Yekaterinburg	KHL	60	8	20	28	28	15	1	6	7	14
2024–25	Avtomobilist Yekaterinburg	KHL	17	3	3	6	10	—	—	—	—	—
2025–26	Avtomobilist Yekaterinburg	KHL	30	6	5	11	14	—	—	—	—	—
2025–26	HC Lugano	NL	3	1	2	3	0	—	—	—	—	—
NHL totals			1	0	0	0	0	—	—	—	—	—
KHL totals			371	68	132	200	203	47	9	23	32	36

=== International ===
Year	Team	Event	Result	GP	G	A	Pts	PIM
2020	Kazakhstan	OGQ	DNQ	3	0	3	3	0
2021	Kazakhstan	WC	10th	7	1	4	5	2
2022	Kazakhstan	WC	14th	7	1	2	3	0
Senior totals				17	2	9	11	2

== Awards and honours ==
Award	Year
WHL
First All-Star Team	2012–13
Second All-Star Team	2013–14
