= Marek Langhamer =

Czech ice hockey player (born 1994)

- Born: 22 July 1994 (age 32) Moravská Třebová, Czech Republic
- Height: 188 cm (6 ft 2 in)
- Weight: 88 kg (194 lb; 13 st 12 lb)
- Position: Goaltender
- Catches: Left
- SHL team Former teams: Malmö Redhawks; Arizona Coyotes; HC Kometa Brno; Amur Khabarovsk; Ilves; IK Oskarshamn
- National team: Czech Republic
- NHL draft: 184th overall, 2012; Phoenix Coyotes
- Playing career: 2011–present

Marek Langhamer (born 22 July 1994) is a Czech professional ice hockey goaltender, currently playing for Malmö Redhawks in the Swedish Hockey League (SHL).

== Playing career ==
After a few seasons playing as a youth within the HC Pardubice organization, Langhamer was selected in the 7th round, 184th overall by the Phoenix Coyotes during the 2012 NHL entry draft.

Following the draft, Langhamer transitioned to the Medicine Hat Tigers of the Western Hockey League. During his second season with the club, the Coyotes signed Langhamer to a three-year, entry-level contract on 8 May 2014.

Langhamer spent the first season of his North American professional career splitting time between the Coyotes' AHL and ECHL affiliates, the Springfield Falcons and the Rapid City Rush. Langhamer made his NHL debut when he replaced Coyotes' starting goaltender Mike Smith during a game on 20 February 2017.

During the 2017–18 season, with the Coyotes having a surplus of goaltending prospects and having played in limited games, the Coyotes loaned Langhamer to HC Kometa Brno in the Czech Extraliga on 9 December 2017. He made 9 appearances with Brno, collecting 6 wins.

In the following 2018–19 season, Langhamer continued his steady play with Kometa Brno, winning 5 games from 8 appearances, before opting to leave the club and accept a contract offer in the KHL with Russian club, Amur Khabarovsk, on 15 November 2018.

Langhamer has played in Ilves Tampere in Finnish Liiga since 2021.

== Career statistics ==
=== Regular season and playoffs ===
			Regular season									Playoffs
Season	Team	League	GP	W	L	T/OT	MIN	GA	SO	GAA	SV%	GP	W	L	MIN	GA	SO	GAA	SV%
2009–10	HC Pardubice	U20	2	0	0	0	30	0	0	0.00	1.000	—	—	—	—	—	—	—	—
2010–11	HC Pardubice	U20	37	18	19	0	2162	113	3	3.14	.913	—	—	—	—	—	—	—	—
2010–11	HC Chrudim	Czech.1	3	1	2	0	107	4	0	2.24	.940	—	—	—	—	—	—	—
2011–12	HC Pardubice	U20	33	15	18	0	1916	105	0	3.29	.909	—	—	—	—	—	—	—	—
2012–13	Medicine Hat Tigers	WHL	30	15	12	1	1450	83	2	3.44	.899	1	0	0	38	5	0	7.83	.833
2013–14	Medicine Hat Tigers	WHL	40	23	14	3	2392	103	2	2.58	.913	18	9	9	1071	42	0	2.35	.934
2014–15	Medicine Hat Tigers	WHL	50	30	16	3	2904	136	2	2.81	.902	10	5	5	657	25	1	2.28	.924
2015–16	Springfield Falcons	AHL	19	7	9	2	1027	65	0	3.80	.883	—	—	—	—	—	—	—	—
2015–16	Rapid City Rush	ECHL	8	5	2	1	484	18	1	2.23	.935	—	—	—	—	—	—	—	—
2016–17	Tucson Roadrunners	AHL	25	8	11	2	1267	71	0	3.36	.902	—	—	—	—	—	—	—	—
2016–17	Rapid City Rush	ECHL	7	5	2	0	419	19	1	2.72	.913	—	—	—	—	—	—	—	—
2016–17	Arizona Coyotes	NHL	1	0	0	0	16	1	0	3.87	.875	—	—	—	—	—	—	—	—
2017–18	Tucson Roadrunners	AHL	3	1	0	2	189	5	0	1.59	.947	—	—	—	—	—	—	—	—
2017–18	Arizona Coyotes	NHL	1	0	0	0	29	0	0	0.00	1.000	—	—	—	—	—	—	—	—
2017–18	HC Kometa Brno	ELH	9	6	3	0	552	18	2	1.96	.924	—	—	—	—	—	—	—	—
2018–19	HC Kometa Brno	ELH	8	5	3	0	453	18	0	2.38	.916	—	—	—	—	—	—	—	—
2018–19	Amur Khabarovsk	KHL	19	9	8	2	1090	36	3	1.98	.929	—	—	—	—	—	—	—	—
2019–20	Amur Khabarovsk	KHL	25	6	16	0	1415	53	1	2.25	.926	—	—	—	—	—	—	—	—
2020–21	Amur Khabarovsk	KHL	27	10	11	2	1464	67	0	2.75	.916	—	—	—	—	—	—	—	—
2021–22	Ilves	Liiga	26	14	6	5	1549	66	0	2.56	.908	13	6	7	802	23	2	1.72	.933
2022–23	Ilves	Liiga	40	23	10	7	2356	72	0	1.83	.924	9	6	3	538	18	0	2.01	.913
2023–24	IK Oskarshamn	SHL	25	5	18	0	1309	77	0	3.53	.874	—	—	—	—	—	—	—	—
2024–25	Malmö Redhawks	SHL	25	12	12	0	1462	67	1	2.75	.892	1	0	0	15	0	0	0.00	1.000
NHL totals			2	0	0	0	45	1	0	1.33	.944	—	—	—	—	—	—	—	—

Medal record

Representing Czech Republic

World Championships
Bronze medal – third place	2022 Finland	

=== International ===
Year	Team	Event	Result	GP	W	L	T	MIN	GA	SO	GAA	SV%
2011	Czech Republic	U17	8th	3	1	2	0	171	8	0	2.80	.900
2011	Czech Republic	IH18	6th	3	—	—	0	—	—	0	3.53	.883
2012	Czech Republic	U18	8th	2	0	2	0	114	9	0	4.77	.859
2014	Czech Republic	WJC	6th	4	1	2	0	244	12	0	2.95	.906
2022	Czech Republic	WC	3rd place, bronze medalist(s)	3	1	1	0	125	5	0	2.38	.902
2023	Czech Republic	WC	8th	2	1	1	0	118	5	0	2.25	.881
Junior totals				12	—	—	0	—	—	0	—	—
Senior totals				5	2	2	0	243	10	0	2.47	.892

== Awards and honours ==
Award	Year	Ref
Czech U18 Best GAA (2.51)	2010–11	
