= Marek Tvrdoň =

Slovak ice hockey winger (born 1993)

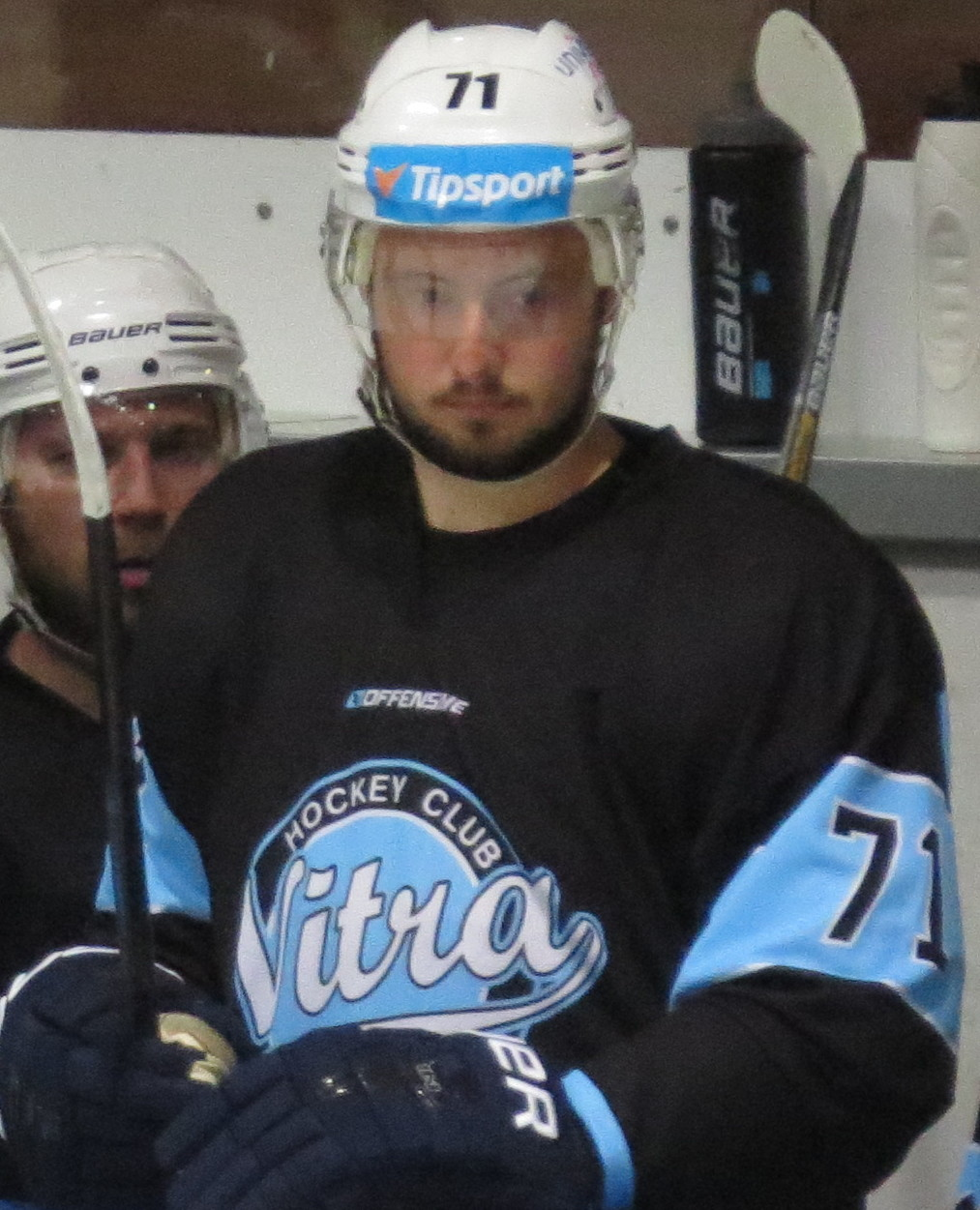
- Tvrdoň with HK Nitra in 2017
- Born: 31 January 1993 (age 33) Nitra, Slovakia
- Height: 6 ft 2 in (188 cm)
- Weight: 212 lb (96 kg; 15 st 2 lb)
- Position: Forward
- Shoots: Left
- Slovak team Former teams: HC Nove Zamky; HK Nitra; HC Slovan Bratislava; Edinburgh Capitals; MsHK Žilina; Saryarka Karagandy; Nottingham Panthers; KS Cracovia
- NHL draft: 115th overall, 2011; Detroit Red Wings
- Playing career: 2010–present

Marek Tvrdoň (born 31 January 1993) is a Slovak ice hockey winger who is currently playing for HC Nove Zamky of the Slovak Extraliga.

Tvrdoň was drafted 115th overall by the Detroit Red Wings in the 2011 NHL entry draft.

== Playing career ==
=== Junior ===
Born in Nitra, Slovakia, Tvrdon developed with his hometown's HK Nitra junior program. Beginning at the under-18 level in 2007–08, he went on to the under-20 level two years later, scoring 56 points (25 goals and 31 assists) over 45 games. During the 2009–10 season, he also played six games with HK Nitra's men's team in the Slovak Extraliga.

During the subsequent 2010–11 season, Tvrdon moved to North America to play for the major junior Vancouver Giants of the Western Hockey League (WHL). He began the campaign with 11 points (6 goals and 5 assists) in 12 games before suffering a shoulder injury in mid-October 2010. The following month, he underwent season-ending surgery. In the off-season, he was selected 115th overall in the 2011 NHL entry draft by the Detroit Red Wings. Giant general manager Scott Bonner speculated that if he had played the full season prior to the draft, he would have been selected much higher, perhaps as a "first or second-round pick". Tvrdon has been described as a player with size and skill, while Giants head coach Don Hay listed his work ethic as a weakness following his first WHL season.

On 8 January 2014 Tvrdoň was traded by the Vancouver Giants to the Kelowna Rockets for a second-round pick in the 2014 WHL Bantam Draft.

=== Professional ===
On 3 July 2012, Tvrdoň signed a three-year entry-level contract with the Detroit Red Wings.

During the final season of his entry-level deal with the Red Wings in 2015–16, Tvrdoň was unable to make an impact within the organization and was primarily assigned to secondary affiliate, the Toledo Walleye of the ECHL. On 19 December 2015, he was placed on unconditional waivers, in order to mutually terminate his contract. He returned to Slovakia and on 22 December 2015, signed a contract for the remainder of the season with HC Slovan Bratislava of the Kontinental Hockey League. Tvrdoň was unable to establish himself in Bratislava, featuring in just 4 scoreless games.

On 30 August 2016, Tvrdoň opted to return to North America as a free agent, agreeing to a one-year deal with the Indy Fuel of the ECHL.

After a spell with HK Nitra in Slovakia, Tvrdoň agreed a deal to move to the Edinburgh Capitals in September 2017.

Tvrdoň has since had spells with MsHK Žilina, Saryarka Karagandy, EC KAC, Nottingham Panthers, KS Cracovia and Dizel Penza.

He re-joined HK Nitra for the 2020-21 season.

== International play ==
Tvrdon represented with Slovakia at the 2010 IIHF World U18 Championships, where he recorded three goals and one assist in six games. Two years later, he represented Slovakia's national junior team at the 2012 World Junior Ice Hockey Championships, where he recorded three goals and one assist in six games, finishing as the second-leading goal scorer on the team. Slovakia finished sixth in the tournament after losing their quarterfinal and the fifth place consolation match.

== Career statistics ==
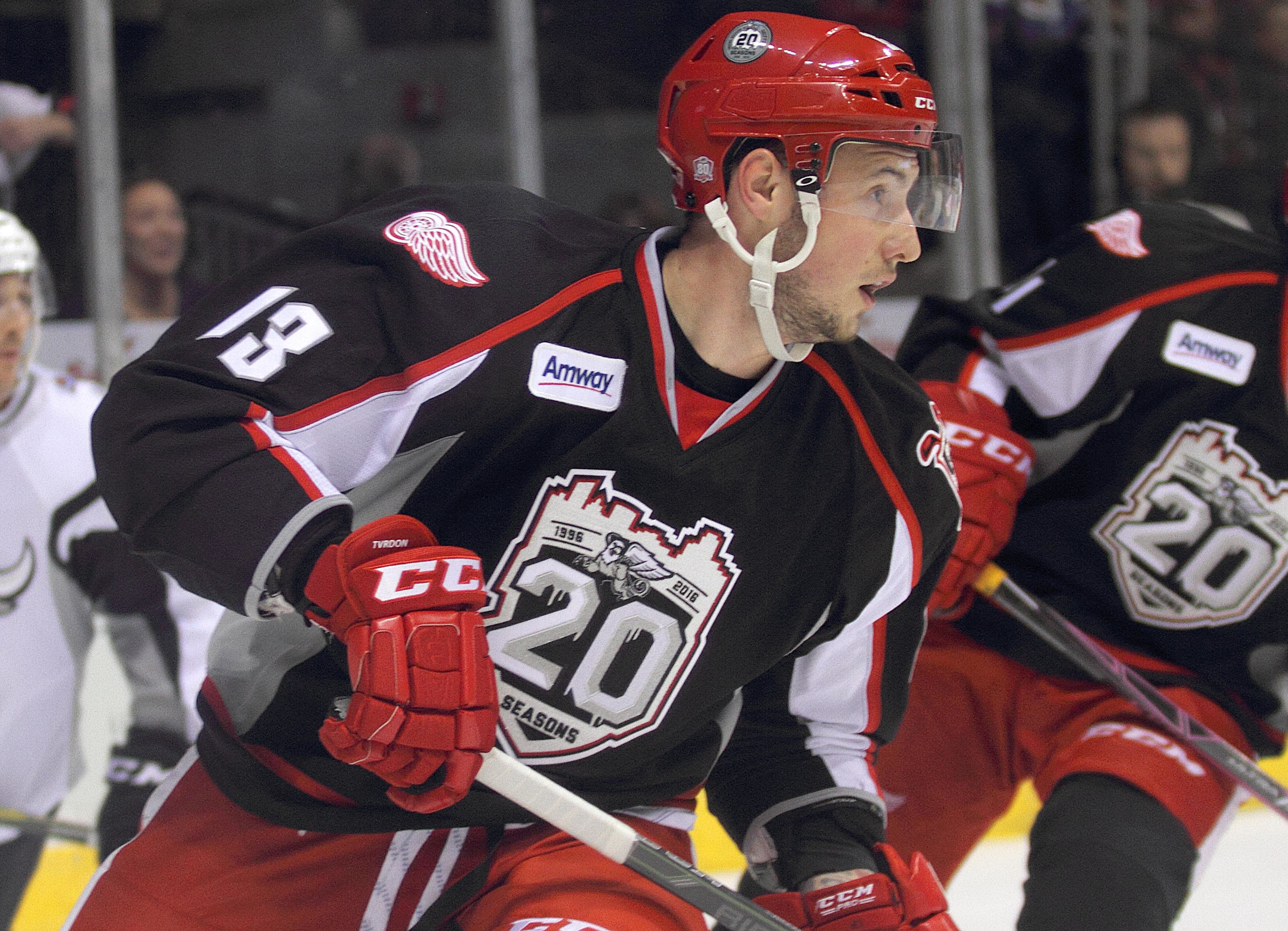
Tvrdoň with the Grand Rapids Griffins in 2015

=== Regular season and playoffs ===
			Regular season					Playoffs
Season	Team	League	GP	G	A	Pts	PIM	GP	G	A	Pts	PIM
2009–10	HK Nitra	Slovak	6	0	0	0	2	—	—	—	—	—
2010–11	Vancouver Giants	WHL	12	6	5	11	14	—	—	—	—	—
2011–12	Vancouver Giants	WHL	60	31	43	74	62	6	3	3	6	0
2012–13	Vancouver Giants	WHL	18	8	14	22	16	—	—	—	—	—
2013–14	Grand Rapids Griffins	AHL	1	0	0	0	0	—	—	—	—	—
2013–14	Toledo Walleye	ECHL	22	9	4	13	6	—	—	—	—	—
2013–14	Kelowna Rockets	WHL	29	11	16	27	24	14	5	8	13	14
2014–15	Toledo Walleye	ECHL	24	6	18	24	14	—	—	—	—	—
2014–15	Grand Rapids Griffins	AHL	51	10	19	29	16	13	2	4	6	2
2015–16	Grand Rapids Griffins	AHL	1	0	0	0	0	—	—	—	—	—
2015–16	Toledo Walleye	ECHL	23	8	13	21	16	—	—	—	—	—
2015–16	HC Slovan Bratislava	KHL	4	0	0	0	2	—	—	—	—	—
2016–17	Indy Fuel	ECHL	21	7	5	12	10	—	—	—	—	—
2016–17	HK Nitra	Slovak	24	6	12	18	42	13	5	4	9	14
2017–18	Edinburgh Capitals	EIHL	15	8	7	15	14	—	—	—	—	—
2017–18	MsHK Žilina	Slovak	31	9	13	22	44	6	0	0	0	2
2018–19	Saryarka Karagandy	VHL	4	0	1	1	0	—	—	—	—	—
2018–19	EC KAC II	AlpsHL	6	3	4	7	10	—	—	—	—	—
2018–19	Nottingham Panthers	EIHL	14	4	6	10	8	—	—	—	—	—
2018–19	KS Cracovia	PHL	3	1	1	2	4	15	3	7	10	12
2019–20	Dizel Penza	VHL	7	0	4	4	0	—	—	—	—	—
2019–20	KS Cracovia	PHL	35	9	16	25	10	7	4	2	6	6
2020–21	HK Nitra	Slovak	50	23	31	54	64	5	1	2	3	0
2021–22	HK Nitra	Slovak	48	12	31	43	14	19	2	8	10	2
2022–23	HK Nitra	Slovak	44	6	12	23	35	4	1	1	2	2
2022–23	HK Levice	2HL	2	0	3	3	0	–	–	–	–	–
2023–24	HC RT Torax Poruba	Chance	46	12	23	35	10	4	2	0	2	2
KHL totals			4	0	0	0	2	—	—	—	—	—
PHL totals			38	10	17	27	14	22	7	9	16	18
Slovak totals			203	56	99	155	186	48	9	15	24	20

=== International ===
Year	Team	Event	Result	GP	G	A	Pts	PIM
2010	Slovakia	U18	8th	6	3	1	4	4
2012	Slovakia	WJC	6th	6	3	1	4	14
Junior totals				12	6	2	8	18
