= Ashton Sautner =

Canadian ice hockey player (born 1994)

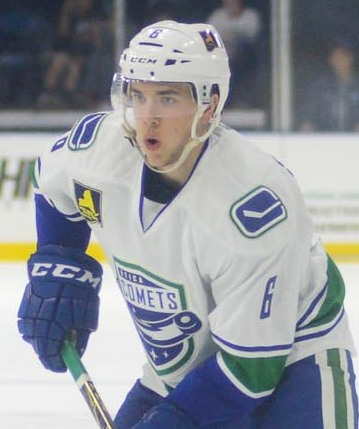
- Sautner with the Utica Comets in 2015
- Born: May 27, 1994 (age 32) Flin Flon, Manitoba, Canada
- Height: 6 ft 1 in (185 cm)
- Weight: 194 lb (88 kg; 13 st 12 lb)
- Position: Defence
- Shoots: Left
- AHL team Former teams: Manitoba Moose; Vancouver Canucks
- NHL draft: Undrafted
- Playing career: 2015–present

Ashton Sautner (born May 27, 1994) is a Canadian professional ice hockey defenceman. He is currently playing for and serving as an alternate captain of the Manitoba Moose in the American Hockey League (AHL).

== Playing career ==
Sautner was selected by the Edmonton Oil Kings in the eighth round (162nd overall) of the 2009 WHL Bantam Draft. During the 2013–14 season, Sautner's plus/minus record was the best in the WHL.

Sautner went to the Minnesota Wild prospect camp before the 2012–13 season. He attended the Arizona Coyotes prospect camp in the 2014 pre-season. During his fourth season with the Oil Kings, despite being undrafted, Sautner was signed to a three-year entry-level contract with the Vancouver Canucks on March 14, 2015. On March 24, 2018, the Canucks recalled Sautner on an emergency basis. He made his NHL debut the following night, a 4–1 Canucks victory over the Dallas Stars. Three games later, on March 31 against the Columbus Blue Jackets, Sautner earned his first NHL point, an assist on a Darren Archibald goal.

Sautner began the 2018–19 season with the Utica Comets in the AHL after clearing waivers. On February 19, he was recalled to the NHL for the first time that season.

After attending the Canucks training camp for the pandemic delayed 2020–21 season, Sautner was initially assigned to the Utica Comets. On January 20, 2021, Sautner was reassigned by the Canucks to the Winnipeg Jets AHL affiliate, the Manitoba Moose, due to shorter quarantine recall regulations. After appearing in two games with Manitoba, he was recalled by Vancouver and spent the rest of the year with the Canucks organization.

Following his sixth season under contract with the Vancouver Canucks, Sautner as a free agent opted to continue within the organization, signing a one-year AHL contract with the inaugural affiliate, the Abbotsford Canucks, on August 13, 2021. In the 2021–22 season, Sautner added 1 assist through 18 games with Abbotsford before he was signed to a one-year, two-way NHL contract with the Canucks on December 18, 2021.

On July 15, 2022, Sautner as a free agent was signed to a one-year, two-way contract with the Winnipeg Jets.

On July 3, 2024, Sautner continued within the Jets organization in agreeing to extend his tenure with the Manitoba Moose in signing a two-year AHL contract.

== Career statistics ==
			Regular season					Playoffs
Season	Team	League	GP	G	A	Pts	PIM	GP	G	A	Pts	PIM
2010–11	Moose Jaw Generals	SMHL	42	12	23	35	43	6	1	2	3	12
2011–12	Edmonton Oil Kings	WHL	59	2	10	12	38	19	0	2	2	10
2012–13	Edmonton Oil Kings	WHL	62	2	10	12	28	14	3	2	5	10
2013–14	Edmonton Oil Kings	WHL	72	8	34	42	26	20	3	9	12	8
2014–15	Edmonton Oil Kings	WHL	72	12	39	51	38	5	0	1	1	6
2015–16	Utica Comets	AHL	50	4	7	11	12	2	0	0	0	0
2016–17	Utica Comets	AHL	47	0	5	5	30	—	—	—	—	—
2017–18	Utica Comets	AHL	61	3	10	13	55	5	0	0	0	4
2017–18	Vancouver Canucks	NHL	5	0	2	2	2	—	—	—	—	—
2018–19	Utica Comets	AHL	31	3	5	8	22	—	—	—	—	—
2018–19	Vancouver Canucks	NHL	17	0	1	1	2	—	—	—	—	—
2019–20	Utica Comets	AHL	51	1	11	12	41	—	—	—	—	—
2019–20	Vancouver Canucks	NHL	1	0	0	0	0	—	—	—	—	—
2020–21	Manitoba Moose	AHL	2	0	0	0	0	—	—	—	—	—
2021–22	Abbotsford Canucks	AHL	41	3	10	13	28	2	0	0	0	2
2022–23	Manitoba Moose	AHL	68	2	10	12	50	5	0	0	0	0
2023–24	Manitoba Moose	AHL	65	5	6	11	44	2	0	0	0	0
2024–25	Manitoba Moose	AHL	63	2	8	10	33	—	—	—	—	—
2025–26	Manitoba Moose	AHL	68	3	10	13	48	7	0	0	0	6
NHL totals			23	0	3	3	4	—	—	—	—	—

== Awards and honours ==
Honours	Year
WHL Plus-Minus Award	2013–14
Memorial Cup Championship	2014
