= Dysin Mayo =

Canadian ice hockey player (born 1996)

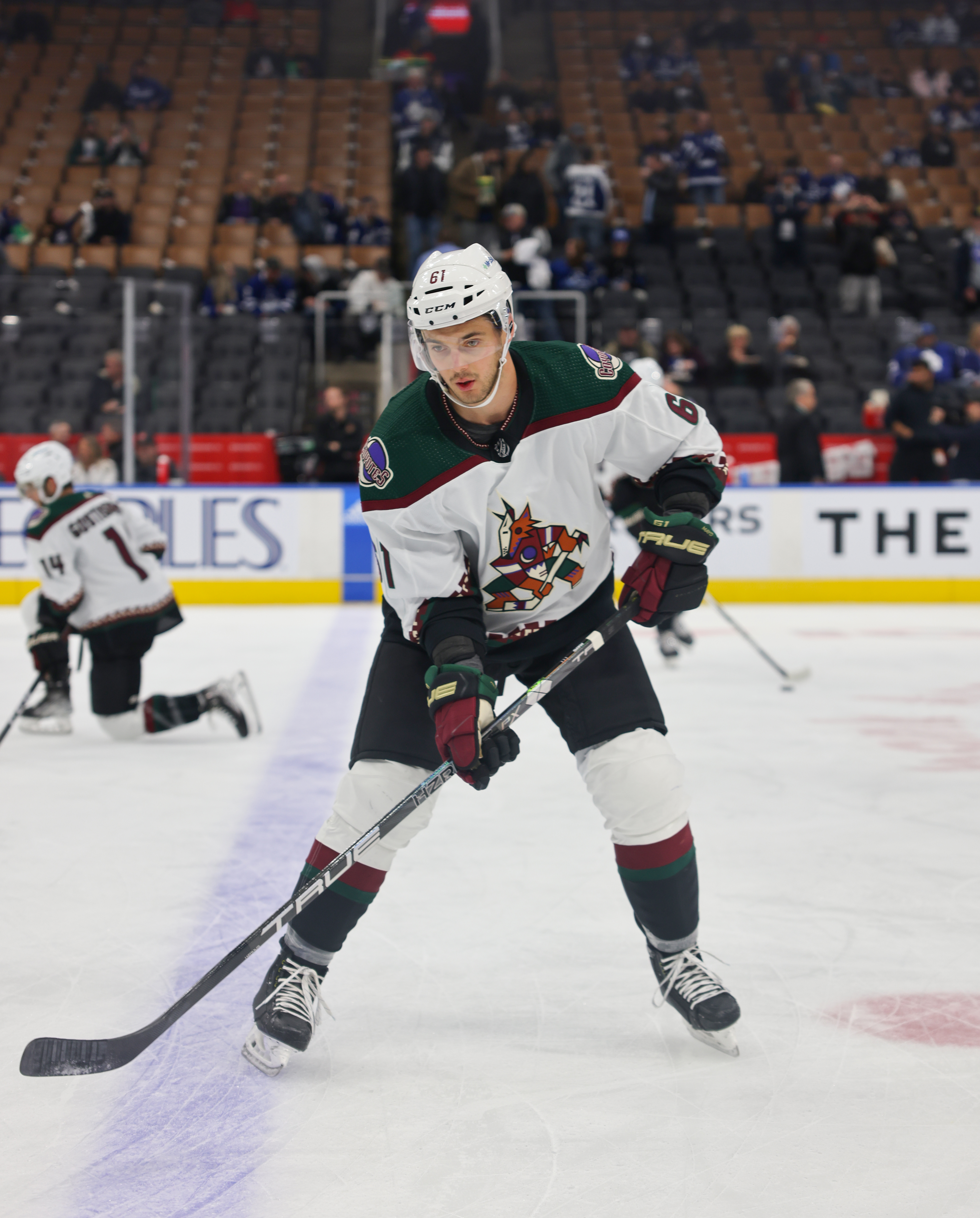
- Mayo with the Arizona Coyotes in 2022
- Born: August 17, 1996 (age 30) Victoria, British Columbia, Canada
- Height: 6 ft 2 in (188 cm)
- Weight: 195 lb (88 kg; 13 st 13 lb)
- Position: Defence
- Shoots: Right
- AHL team Former teams: Manitoba Moose; Arizona Coyotes; Columbus Blue Jackets
- National team: Canada
- NHL draft: 133rd overall, 2014; Arizona Coyotes
- Playing career: 2016–present

Dysin Mayo (born August 17, 1996) is a Canadian professional ice hockey defenceman for the Manitoba Moose in the American Hockey League (AHL).

== Playing career ==
He played junior hockey with the Edmonton Oil Kings and was drafted by the Coyotes in the fifth-round, 133rd overall, of the 2014 NHL entry draft. He was signed to a three-year, entry-level contract with the Arizona Coyotes during the 2015–16 season, on December 27, 2015.

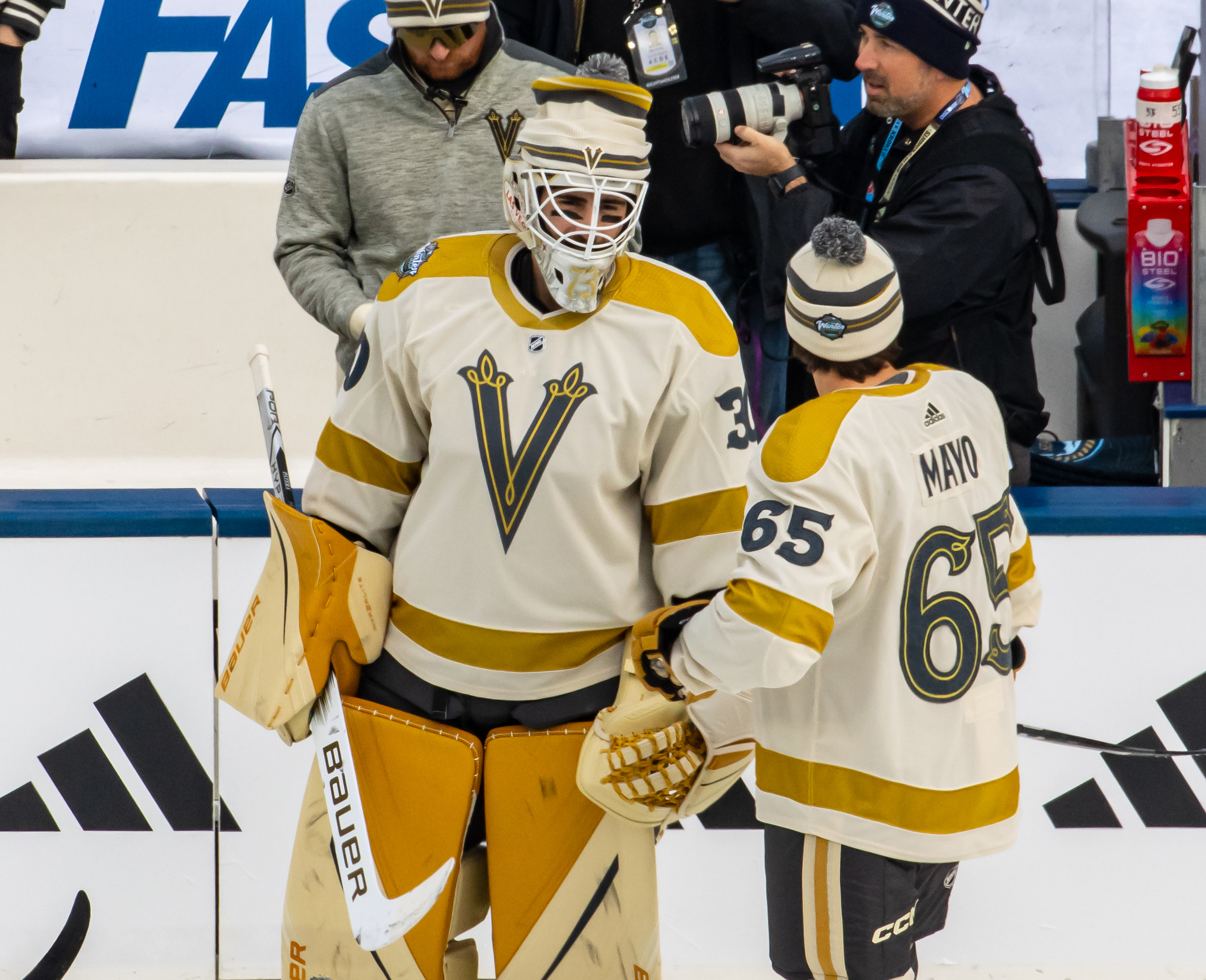
Mayo (right) and Jiří Patera (left) prior to the 2024 NHL Winter Classic. Mayo was a healthy scratch and did not appear in the game.

Approaching his seventh season within the Coyotes organization, Mayo began the 2021–22 season familiarly assigned to AHL affiliate, the Tucson Roadrunners, in which he was selected as team captain as the longest tenured player in his sixth year with the club. With the season underway Mayo played just two games with the Roadrunners before he was recalled by the Coyotes on October 18, 2021. He made his long-awaited NHL debut with the Coyotes, becoming the first Coyote defenseman to score in his debut since Tony DeAngelo in 2016, in a 5–1 defeat to the Edmonton Oilers on October 21, 2021.

On February 25, 2022, Mayo was signed by the Coyotes to a three-year, $2.85 million contract extension.

During the 2022–23 season, while assigned to the Roadrunners, Mayo was traded by the Coyotes to the Vegas Golden Knights in exchange for a 2023 fifth-round pick and the contract of Shea Weber.

Following the end of his tenure in Vegas' organization, Mayo signed a one-year contract with the Columbus Blue Jackets on July 16, 2025. In the 2025–26 season, Mayo was assigned to add a veteran presence with AHL affiliate, the Cleveland Monsters, and tallied 29 points in 59 games. He was recalled during the season to the Blue Jackets and made 3 appearances in the NHL, notching 1 assist.

As a free agent from the Blue Jackets, Mayo was signed to a two-year AHL contract with the Manitoba Moose, affiliate to the Winnipeg Jets, on July 6, 2026.

== Career statistics ==
=== Regular season and playoffs ===
			Regular season					Playoffs
Season	Team	League	GP	G	A	Pts	PIM	GP	G	A	Pts	PIM
2011–12	Victoria Cougars	VIJHL	1	0	1	1	0	—	—	—	—	—
2012–13	Edmonton Oil Kings	WHL	42	1	4	5	12	19	0	4	4	2
2013–14	Edmonton Oil Kings	WHL	63	7	28	35	50	21	3	12	15	10
2014–15	Edmonton Oil Kings	WHL	72	14	37	51	75	5	0	2	2	2
2015–16	Edmonton Oil Kings	WHL	71	6	37	43	86	6	0	0	0	8
2015–16	Springfield Falcons	AHL	5	0	1	1	2	—	—	—	—	—
2016–17	Tucson Roadrunners	AHL	25	1	2	3	0	—	—	—	—	—
2016–17	Rapid City Rush	ECHL	25	1	15	16	4	—	—	—	—	—
2017–18	Tucson Roadrunners	AHL	66	5	11	16	45	7	0	0	0	4
2018–19	Tucson Roadrunners	AHL	67	2	4	6	46	—	—	—	—	—
2019–20	Tucson Roadrunners	AHL	58	4	8	12	34	—	—	—	—	—
2020–21	Tucson Roadrunners	AHL	35	1	3	4	22	1	0	0	0	0
2021–22	Tucson Roadrunners	AHL	2	0	0	0	2	—	—	—	—	—
2021–22	Arizona Coyotes	NHL	67	4	8	12	27	—	—	—	—	—
2022–23	Arizona Coyotes	NHL	15	0	0	0	8	—	—	—	—	—
2022–23	Tucson Roadrunners	AHL	26	2	5	7	20	—	—	—	—	—
2022–23	Henderson Silver Knights	AHL	17	1	3	4	8	—	—	—	—	—
2023–24	Henderson Silver Knights	AHL	67	5	20	25	79	—	—	—	—	—
2024–25	Henderson Silver Knights	AHL	58	8	11	19	86	—	—	—	—	—
2025–26	Cleveland Monsters	AHL	59	3	26	29	52	9	0	3	3	6
2025–26	Columbus Blue Jackets	NHL	3	0	1	1	0	—	—	—	—	—
NHL totals			85	4	9	13	35	—	—	—	—	—

Medal record

Representing Canada

Ice hockey

World Championships
Silver medal – second place	2022 Finland	

=== International ===
Year	Team	Event	Result	GP	G	A	Pts	PIM
2013	Canada Pacific	U17	5th	5	0	3	3	2
2022	Canada	WC	2nd place, silver medalist(s)	10	1	1	2	2
Junior totals				5	0	3	3	2
Senior totals				10	1	1	2	2

== Awards and honours ==
Award	Year
CHL
Memorial Cup (Edmonton Oil Kings)	2014
