= Luke Philp =

Canadian ice hockey player

- Born: November 6, 1995 (age 30) Canmore, Alberta, Canada
- Height: 5 ft 10 in (178 cm)
- Weight: 181 lb (82 kg; 12 st 13 lb)
- Position: Centre
- Shoots: Right
- AHL team Former teams: Calgary Wranglers; Chicago Blackhawks; Färjestad BK
- NHL draft: Undrafted
- Playing career: 2019–present

Luke Philp (born November 6, 1995) is a Canadian professional ice hockey forward for the Calgary Wranglers of the American Hockey League (AHL).

== Playing career ==
Philp played as a youth within the AMBHL, AMHL and AJHL before he was selected in the 2010 WHL Bantam Draft by the Kootenay Ice, in the third round, 59th overall.

Philp appeared in parts of five major junior seasons with the Kootenay Ice of the Western Hockey League, before ending his junior career as captain of the Red Deer Rebels in the 2015–16 season.

Undrafted, Philp opted to play collegiate hockey by committing to the University of Alberta and playing three seasons of USports hockey. In starring for the Alberta Golden Bears, Philp as the two-time West Conference MVP and League MVP, was signed to a two-year, entry-level contract with the Calgary Flames on March 20, 2019.

In turning professional, Philp was reassigned to begin his career with the Flames' AHL affiliate, the Stockton Heat. With his offensive instinct translating at the AHL, Philp was amongst the Heat's leading scorers in both COVID-19 pandemic affected seasons of his entry-level contract, earning a one-year, two-way contract extension within the Flames organization for the 2021–22 season on August 7, 2021.

Returning for his third season with the Heat, Philp placed fourth on team scoring in registering career bests of 21 goals and 23 assists for 44 points in 66 games. He notched a further 5 points in 10 playoff games in helping the Heat reach the Conference Finals in their final season.

As a free agent from the Flames, Philp signed a one-year, two-way contract with the Chicago Blackhawks on July 14, 2022. After attending the Blackhawks 2022 training camp, Philp was familiarly reassigned to the AHL, joining affiliate the Rockford IceHogs. In the 2022–23 season, Philp notched 30 points through his first 31 games with the IceHogs to earn his first recall to the NHL, on January 23, 2023. He made his debut with the rebuilding Blackhawks the following day in a 5–2 defeat to the Vancouver Canucks. He registered his first point, a game-winning assist, in his second career game during a 5–1 defeat over the former club, the Calgary Flames, on January 26, 2023. He was returned to the AHL to continue his tenure with the IceHogs on January 29, 2023. The Blackhawks signed him to a one-year, two-way contract extension on March 9, 2023.

As a free agent from the Blackhawks, Philp was signed to a one-year, two-way contract with the Washington Capitals on July 2, 2024.

After a lone season within the Capitals organization, Philp left at the conclusion of his contract to sign a one-year deal with Swedish club, Färjestad BK of the Swedish Hockey League (SHL), on 26 July 2025. In his lone season abroad in 2025–26, Philp contributed offensively within Färjestad, posting 13 goals and 22 assists for 35 points in 52 regular season appearances.

As a free agent, Philp opted to return to North America and returned within the Flames organization by signing a one-year AHL contract with the Calgary Wranglers on July 2, 2026.

== Personal life ==
Luke is the middle of three hockey-playing brothers, with the youngest Noah playing as a prospect within the Edmonton Oilers organization. He played with his older brother, Simon, during his tenure in the AJHL with the Canmore Eagles in 2012.

== Career statistics ==
			Regular season					Playoffs
Season	Team	League	GP	G	A	Pts	PIM	GP	G	A	Pts	PIM
2008–09	Airdrie Extreme	AMBHL	1	2	1	3	2	—	—	—	—	—
2009–10	Airdrie Extreme	AMBHL	27	30	29	59	36	4	3	4	7	2
2010–11	UFA Bisons	AMHL	33	20	33	53	16	9	1	4	5	4
2011–12	Canmore Eagles	AJHL	48	16	30	46	28	—	—	—	—	—
2011–12	Kootenay Ice	WHL	17	1	1	2	2	3	0	0	0	0
2012–13	Kootenay Ice	WHL	66	20	25	45	24	5	2	1	3	0
2013–14	Kootenay Ice	WHL	71	31	46	77	31	13	5	8	13	17
2014–15	Kootenay Ice	WHL	71	30	52	82	28	7	5	7	12	6
2015–16	Kootenay Ice	WHL	22	13	16	29	30	—	—	—	—	—
2015–16	Red Deer Rebels	WHL	17	8	8	16	6	17	4	9	13	9
2016–17	University of Alberta	USports	26	10	8	18	33	6	4	0	4	4
2017–18	University of Alberta	USports	28	11	29	40	14	4	0	2	2	2
2018–19	University of Alberta	USports	24	21	24	45	30	5	1	2	3	2
2019–20	Stockton Heat	AHL	52	19	12	31	20	—	—	—	—	—
2020–21	Stockton Heat	AHL	30	8	9	17	8	—	—	—	—	—
2021–22	Stockton Heat	AHL	66	21	23	44	16	10	1	4	5	0
2022–23	Rockford IceHogs	AHL	60	29	24	53	29	5	0	2	2	0
2022–23	Chicago Blackhawks	NHL	3	0	1	1	2	—	—	—	—	—
2023–24	Rockford IceHogs	AHL	15	2	4	6	6	4	1	1	2	0
2024–25	Hershey Bears	AHL	58	10	20	30	18	8	1	3	4	4
2025–26	Färjestad BK	SHL	52	13	22	35	18	5	0	2	2	2
NHL totals			3	0	1	1	2	—	—	—	—	—
SHL totals			52	13	22	35	18	5	0	2	2	2

== Awards and honours ==
Award	Year
AJHL
South All-Rookie Team	2012
U Sports
West First All-Star Team	2018, 2019
Dave Sweeney Schriner Scoring Trophy	2018, 2019
West MVP	2018, 2019
USports All-Canadian First Team	2018, 2019
Cup Champion (Golden Bears)	2018
Senator Joseph A. Sullivan Trophy	2019
