= Tyrell Goulbourne =

Canadian ice hockey player

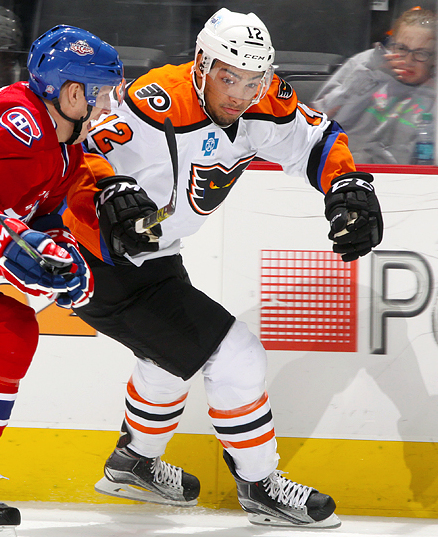
- Goulbourne with the Lehigh Valley Phantoms in 2015
- Born: January 26, 1994 (age 32) Edmonton, Alberta, Canada
- Height: 5 ft 11 in (180 cm)
- Weight: 195 lb (88 kg; 13 st 13 lb)
- Position: Left wing
- Shoots: Left
- ECHL team Former teams: Tulsa Oilers; Philadelphia Flyers; Chicago Wolves; Henderson Silver Knights; Belleville Senators; Stockton Heat; Ontario Reign
- NHL draft: 72nd overall, 2013; Philadelphia Flyers
- Playing career: 2015–present

Tyrell Goulbourne (born January 26, 1994) is a Canadian professional ice hockey forward who is the current captain for the Tulsa Oilers of the ECHL. He has formerly played parts of two seasons in the National Hockey League (NHL) for the Philadelphia Flyers. He was drafted by the Flyers in the third round of the 2013 NHL entry draft.

== Playing career ==
Goulbourne was drafted in the 5th round, 105th overall, by the Kelowna Rockets in the 2009 WHL Bantam Draft. In 2013, Goulbourne was named an assistant captain for the Rockets and was drafted in the third round of the 2013 NHL entry draft by the Philadelphia Flyers. He played with the Rockets for two more seasons before signing an entry-level contract with the Flyers on March 3, 2015.

Goulbourne was assigned to the Flyers' American Hockey League (AHL) affiliate, the Lehigh Valley Phantoms for the 2015–16 season. He struggled in his first two AHL seasons, only earning 18 points in a combined 97 games, and was reassigned to the Reading Royals in the ECHL. He described the demotion as "hitting rock bottom" and eventually created enough consistency to play back in the AHL the following season.

Goulbourne began the 2017–18 season in the American Hockey League. He was recalled on January 3 and Goulbourne made his NHL debut on January 6, 2018, against the St. Louis Blues. He re-signed a one-year contract with the Flyers organization on July 15, 2018.

After four seasons within the Flyers organization, Goulbourne left as a free agent to sign a two-year, two-way $700,000 contract with the Vegas Golden Knights on July 1, 2019.

Goulbourne never made an appearance with the Golden Knights during his contract with the club, leaving as a free agent to continue his career in the AHL by agreeing to a one-year contract with the Belleville Senators, affiliate of the Ottawa Senators, on August 10, 2021.

In the 2021–22 season, Goulbourne made just 9 appearances with Belleville before he was later re-assigned to ECHL club, the Atlanta Gladiators. While with the Gladiators, Goulbourne was traded from the Senators to the Stockton Heat as a part of future considerations trade involving goalie Michael McNiven on March 21, 2022.

On September 6, 2022 Goulbourne announced his retirement from professional hockey via a post on his personal Instagram. Goulbourne's retirement was short-lived, as he opted to resume his professional career by signing a professional tryout contract with the Ontario Reign of the AHL, affiliate to the Los Angeles Kings, on January 5, 2023.

== Personal life ==
Goulbourne was raised in Edmonton, Alberta, to parents Mark and Georgia Goulbourne. His mother is of Jamaican heritage and moved to Canada while in her teens and his father is a music producer.

== Career statistics ==
			Regular season					Playoffs
Season	Team	League	GP	G	A	Pts	PIM	GP	G	A	Pts	PIM
2009–10	Kelowna Rockets	WHL	5	0	1	1	0	—	—	—	—	—
2010–11	Kelowna Rockets	WHL	13	1	0	1	27	6	0	0	0	6
2011–12	Kelowna Rockets	WHL	63	6	8	14	109	4	0	0	0	2
2012–13	Kelowna Rockets	WHL	64	14	13	27	135	11	1	2	3	15
2013–14	Kelowna Rockets	WHL	68	17	20	37	114	14	2	3	5	23
2014–15	Kelowna Rockets	WHL	62	22	23	45	76	12	1	1	2	23
2015–16	Lehigh Valley Phantoms	AHL	73	7	10	17	75	—	—	—	—	—
2016–17	Lehigh Valley Phantoms	AHL	24	1	0	1	24	1	0	0	0	7
2016–17	Reading Royals	ECHL	36	8	11	19	35	—	—	—	—	—
2017–18	Lehigh Valley Phantoms	AHL	63	8	10	18	79	10	2	0	2	12
2017–18	Philadelphia Flyers	NHL	9	0	0	0	2	—	—	—	—	—
2018–19	Lehigh Valley Phantoms	AHL	63	9	9	18	135	—	—	—	—	—
2018–19	Philadelphia Flyers	NHL	2	0	0	0	0	—	—	—	—	—
2019–20	Chicago Wolves	AHL	53	1	2	3	42	—	—	—	—	—
2020–21	Henderson Silver Knights	AHL	18	1	1	2	29	—	—	—	—	—
2021–22	Belleville Senators	AHL	9	0	0	0	0	—	—	—	—	—
2021–22	Atlanta Gladiators	ECHL	1	0	0	0	4	—	—	—	—	—
2021–22	Stockton Heat	AHL	9	0	1	1	14	4	0	1	1	2
2022–23	Ontario Reign	AHL	22	2	2	4	24	2	1	0	1	2
NHL totals			11	0	0	0	2	—	—	—	—	—
