= Brett Pollock (ice hockey) =

Canadian ice hockey winger

- Born: 17 March 1996 (age 30) Regina, Saskatchewan, Canada
- Height: 6 ft 3 in (191 cm)
- Weight: 195 lb (88 kg; 13 st 13 lb)
- Position: Winger
- Shoots: Left
- ICEHL team Former teams: HC Bolzano; HC Košice; Kunlun Red Star; Schwenninger Wild Wings; Södertälje SK; Nürnberg Ice Tigers; San Diego Gulls; Allen Americans; Stockton Heat; Adirondack Thunder
- NHL draft: 45th overall, 2014; Dallas Stars
- Playing career: 2015–present

Brett David Pollock (born 17 March 1996) is a Canadian professional ice hockey winger who currently plays for HC Bolzano of the ICEHL.

== Life ==
Pollock was born in Regina, Saskatchewan. On the junior level, he played for the Sherwood Park Squires and Edmonton Oil Kings youth squads. In the 2014 NHL entry draft, he was drafted in the second round by the Dallas Stars as the 45th pick, but did not make it to the main team. He played American Hockey League mainly for Stockton Heat 3 years and later moved overseas. Following a stints in Germany and Sweden, he joined the Beijing-based Kontinental Hockey League team Kunlun Red Star. In the 2022–23 Slovak Extraliga season he joined HC Košice as a replacement for another Canadian player Colin Campbell, who joined Kunlun Red Star.

In 2025, he transferred to the ICEHL outfit HC Bolzano.

== Career statistics ==
			Regular season					Playoffs
Season	Team	League	GP	G	A	Pts	PIM	GP	G	A	Pts	PIM
2015–16	Stockton Heat	AHL	3	1	0	1	2	—	—	—	—	—
2016–17	Adirondack Thunder	ECHL	61	15	16	31	14	6	0	4	4	2
2017–18	Stockton Heat	AHL	46	10	10	20	19	—	—	—	—	—
2018–19	Stockton Heat	AHL	53	3	9	12	20	—	—	—	—	—
2019–20	Allen Americans	ECHL	49	16	27	43	44	—	—	—	—	—
2019–20	San Diego Gulls (Loan)	AHL	5	0	2	2	2	—	—	—	—	—
2020–21	Nürnberg Ice Tigers	DEL	38	11	14	25	24	—	—	—	—	—
2021–22	Södertälje SK	HockeyAllsvenskan	28	8	17	25	47	—	—	—	—	—
2021–22	Schwenninger Wild Wings	DEL	18	7	7	14	14	—	—	—	—	—
2022–23	Kunlun Red Star	KHL	29	2	7	9	14	—	—	—	—	—
2022–23	HC Košice	SVK	24	11	8	19	12	17	7	7	14	16
2023–24	HC Košice	SVK	50	19	21	40	101	11	6	14	20	10
2024–25	HC Košice	SVK	44	19	23	42	61	19	5	13	18	18
2025–26	HC Bolzano	ICEHL	–	–	–	–	–	–	–	–	–	–
AHL totals			107	14	21	35	43	—	—	—	—	—
ECHL totals			110	31	43	74	58	6	0	4	4	2
DEL totals			56	18	21	39	38	—	—	—	—	—
SVK totals			118	49	52	101	174	47	18	34	52	44

== Awards and honors ==
Award	Year
Slovak
Champion	2023, 2025
