= Patrik Polívka =

Czech ice hockey player

- Born: March 14, 1994 (age 31); Plzeň, Czech Republic
- Height: 6 ft 0 in (183 cm)
- Weight: 173 lb (78 kg; 12 st 5 lb)
- Position: Goaltender
- Catches: Left
- Czech team Former teams: HC Plzeň; Victoria Royals
- Playing career: 2012–present

Patrik Polívka (born March 4, 1994) is a Czech professional ice hockey goalie. He is currently playing for HC Plzeň of the Czech Extraliga.

Polívka made his Czech Extraliga debut playing with HC Plzeň during the 2014-15 Czech Extraliga season where he stopped 21 of the 25 shots he faced.
