= Eetu Laurikainen =

Finnish ice hockey player (born 1993)

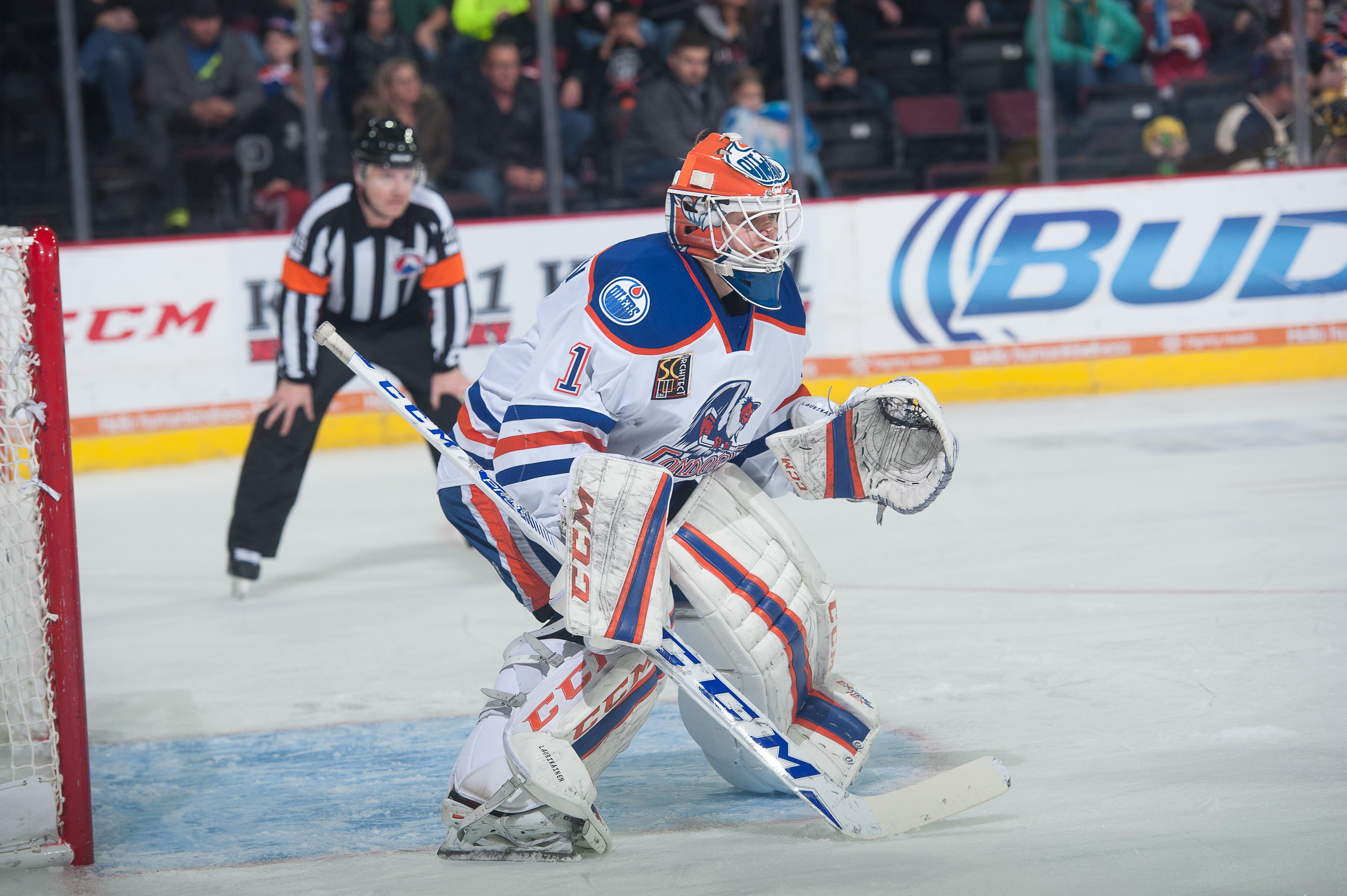
- Laurikainen with the Bakersfield Condors in 2016
- Born: February 1, 1993 (age 32) Jyväskylä, Finland
- Height: 6 ft 0 in (183 cm)
- Weight: 185 lb (84 kg; 13 st 3 lb)
- Position: Goaltender
- Caught: Left
- Played for: Espoo Blues; HPK; JYP; Lausanne HC; HC TPS; Mountfield HK
- NHL draft: Undrafted
- Playing career: 2011–2025

Eetu Laurikainen (born February 1, 1993) is a Finnish former professional ice hockey player who is a goaltender.

== Playing career ==
Laurikainen made his Liiga debut playing with Espoo Blues during the 2014–15 Liiga season. On May 12, 2015, Laurikainen signed a two-year, entry-level contract with the Edmonton Oilers.

In his two seasons within the Oilers organization, Laurikainen was unable to make an impact, appearing in just 18 games with secondary affiliate, the Bakersfield Condors of the American Hockey League (AHL). After spending the entirety of the 2016–17 season with the Norfolk Admirals of the ECHL, Laurikainen opted to return to his native Finland in agreeing to a two-year contract with JYP of the Liiga on June 12, 2017.
