= Jens Meilleur =

Canadian-German ice hockey player (born 1993)

- Born: January 11, 1993 (age 33) Marquette, Manitoba, Canada
- Height: 6 ft 1 in (185 cm)
- Weight: 196 lb (89 kg; 14 st 0 lb)
- Position: Right wing
- Shot: Right
- Played for: Thomas Sabo Ice Tigers; Kassel Huskies
- NHL draft: Undrafted
- Playing career: 2014–2019

Jens Meilleur (born January 11, 1993) is a retired Canadian-German professional ice hockey player.

== Playing career ==
Meilleur was a member of the Winnipeg Hawks Bantam 1 squad in the Winnipeg AAA league in 2007–08, and then played for the Central Plains Capitals in the Manitoba AAA Midget Hockey League the following season. He was drafted in the seventh round by the Brandon Wheat Kings of the Western Hockey League and by the Waywayseecappo Wolverines (seventh overall).

In December 2009 and January 2010, he represented Team Canada at the World Under-17 Hockey Challenge in Timmins, Ontario. From 2010 to 2014, Meilleur played for the Brandon Wheat Kings in the WHL, serving as assistant captain the last two years.

Prior to the 2014-15 campaign, he signed to play with the Kassel Huskies of the German second tier-league DEL2. He won the DEL2 title with the Huskies in the 2015–16 season and shortly after signed a two-year deal with the Nürnberg Ice Tigers of the German top-flight Deutsche Eishockey Liga (DEL). In November 2016, he was released from his contract at his own request and returned to the Kassel Huskies the next day. He announced the end of his professional ice hockey career in September 2019 to return to his home in Canada.

== Personal life ==
Meilleur grew up in Elie, Manitoba. His sister Meike is a member of the Penn State University Women's Ice Hockey Team, his brothers Mats and Lars played ice hockey for the St. Vital Victorias in the Manitoba Major Junior Hockey League.

Meilleur's grandparents come from Germany. He was granted German citizenship in 2013.
