= Kole Lind =

Canadian ice hockey player (born 1998)

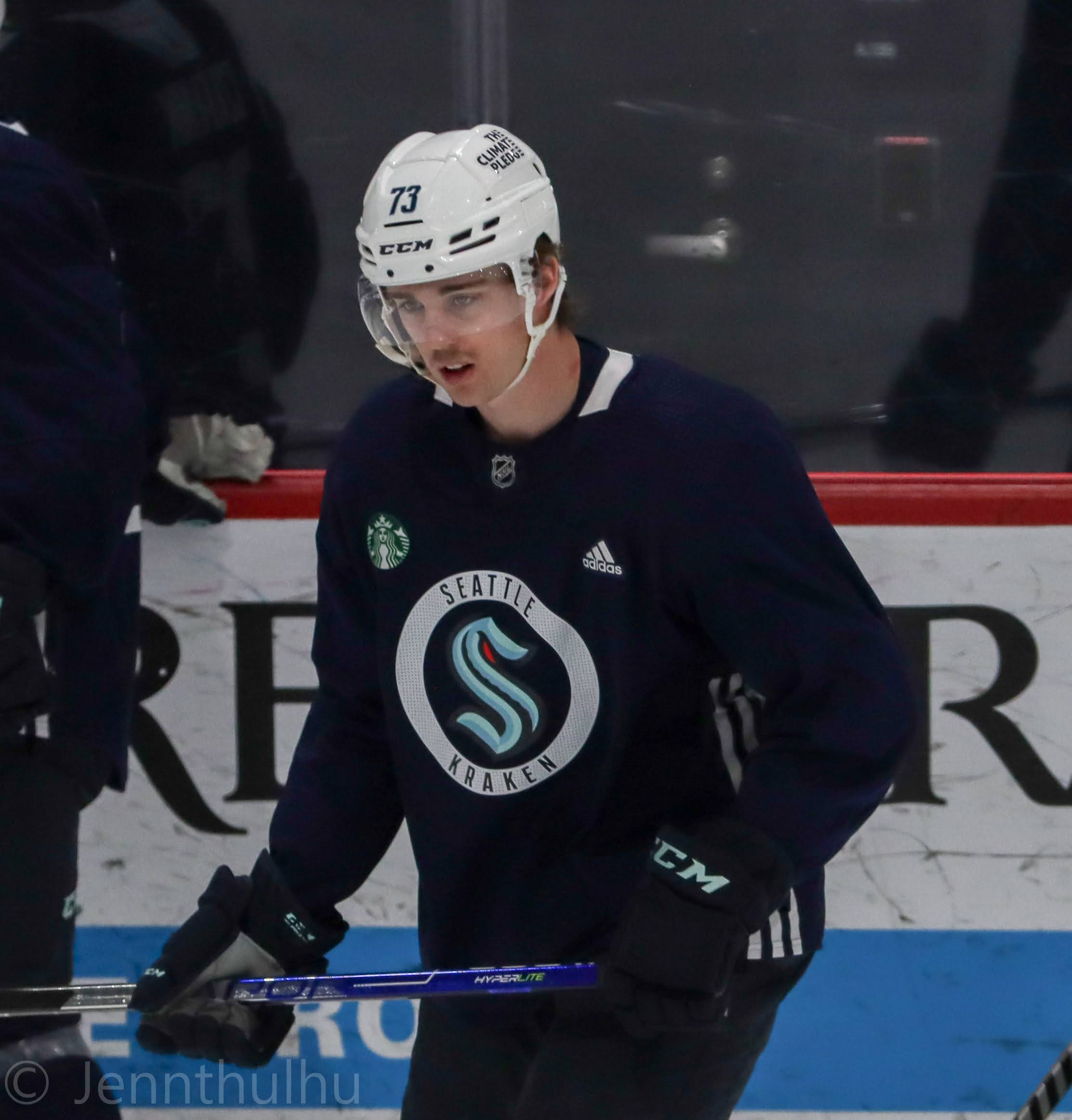
- Lind with the Seattle Kraken in 2022
- Born: October 16, 1998 (age 27) Swift Current, Saskatchewan, Canada
- Height: 6 ft 1 in (185 cm)
- Weight: 190 lb (86 kg; 13 st 8 lb)
- Position: Right wing
- Shoots: Right
- NHL team (P) Cur. team Former teams: Dallas Stars; Texas Stars (AHL); Vancouver Canucks; Seattle Kraken
- NHL draft: 33rd overall, 2017; Vancouver Canucks
- Playing career: 2018–present

Kole Lind (born October 16, 1998) is a Canadian professional ice hockey player currently signed with the Abbotsford Canucks, joining from unrestricted free agent after leaving the Texas Stars in the American Hockey League (AHL). He signed a 1 year deal with Abbotsford in October 2026.

== Early life ==
Lind was born on October 16, 1998, in Swift Current, Saskatchewan, Canada to parents Ashley and Marcia. Lind's father Ashley grew up playing minor hockey alongside Hayley Wickenheiser before running a farm in Admiral, Saskatchewan. Beyond his father, his sisters Taylor and Tenelle played collegiate ice hockey while his younger brother Kalan was drafted by the Nashville Predators in the 2023 NHL entry draft.

== Playing career ==
Growing up in Saskatchewan, Lind played minor ice hockey for the Swift Current Legionnaires of the Saskatchewan Male U18 AAA Hockey League (SMAAAHL) and for the Swift Current Kabos Bantam AA Raiders. He tallied 46 points during the 2012–13 regular season with the Raiders and was subsequently drafted by the Kelowna Rockets in the 2013 Western Hockey League bantam draft. Following the draft, he joined the Saskatoon Contacts for the 2013–14 SMAAAHL season and represented Saskatchewan at the 2013 Western Canada Under 16 Challenge Cup. Upon returning from the tournament, Lind finished the season with the Contacts and tallied 21 goals and 16 assists for 37 points through 44 games.

Lind returned to the Contacts for the 2014–15 season where he broke out offensively and accumulated 45 goals and 34 assists for 79 points through 44 games. As such, Lind was named their 2014 Player of the Month in November and was named to the league's 2014–15 First Team All-Star. Once the SMAAAHL season was finished, Lind played six regular-season games with the Rockets and seven playoff games. He tallied his first WHL playoff point with an assist Tomas Soustal’s third period goal to help them beat the Victoria Royals in Game 1.

=== Major junior ===
Following his short stint with the Rockets during the 2014–15 season, Lind began his first full-length WHL campaign during the 2015–16 season. During the pre-season, Lind and Dillon Dube led their team in pre-season scoring with six points each. He began his rookie campaign playing alongside Dube and Tyson Baillie and quickly recorded his first career WHL hat-trick by December 2015. Lind finished his rookie season with 41 points through 70 games while going goalless in his last 30 games. Upon finishing his rookie season, Lind spent the 2016 offseason in Florida working with a skills coach on training and power skating.

Upon returning to the Rockets for his sophomore season, Lind entered his first year of draft eligibility strong and quickly set new career highs. He played alongside Dube and Tomas Soustal became the team leader in both points and goals while also tying Cal Foote for most assists. Lind finished the 2016–17 season with 30 goals and 87 points through 70 regular-season games while also recording six goals and six assists in 17 playoff contests. His point totals placed him fourth amongst first-time draft-eligible WHL forwards while his points per game ranked him fifth amongst that same peer group. As a result, Lind was ranked 23rd among North American skaters eligible for the 2017 NHL entry draft by Central Scouting and earned praise from International Scouting Services for his "high end" vision and skill-set. Lind was eventually drafted 33rd overall by the Vancouver Canucks on the second day of the 2017 NHL Entry Draft. Following the draft, Lind was invited to attend the Canucks' Summer Development Camp.

After attending the Canucks' Development Camp, Lind returned to the Rockets for his third and final major junior season. He began the 2017–18 season with 11 goals and 21 assists through 20 games before missing over six games while recovering from mononucleosis. Despite missing numerous games, Lind remained the team's scoring leader. As such, he was invited to participate in Team Canada's 2018 World Junior Ice Hockey Championships tryouts but was cut before the final roster was announced. After being cut from Team Canada's roster, Lind returned to the Rockets and tallied eight points in three games. One of these games included his second career hat-trick to lift the Rockets over the Kamloops Blazers.

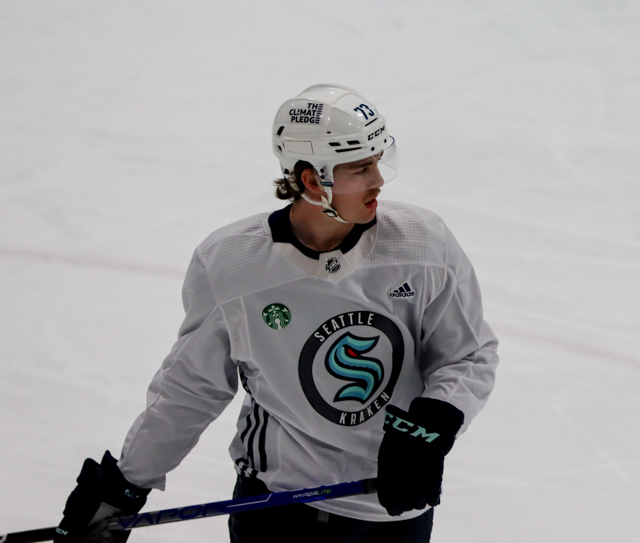
Lind during Seattle Kraken practice in 2022.

=== Professional career ===
==== Vancouver Canucks ====
On March 1, 2018, Lind signed a three-year entry-level contract with the Canucks and agreed to an amateur tryout agreement with their American Hockey League (AHL) affiliate, the Utica Comets, at the end of the 2017–18 season. Upon joining the Comets, Lind appeared in six games where he registered one assist. Following this, Lind attended the Canucks 2018–19 season development camp but was returned to the Comets for his first full professional campaign. He played six games with the Comets before suffering an injury during a game against the Syracuse Crunch. Lind returned to the lineup on November 28 and tallied his first professional goal on January 16 against the Crunch.

In the pandemic delayed 2020–21 season, Lind was assigned to the Utica Comets and posted 8 points in his first eight games, before suffering a broken nose when struck in the face during a game against the Rochester Americans on March 3, 2021. After being cleared medically, he was assigned to the Canucks’ taxi squad on April 1, 2021. He made his NHL debut with the Canucks in a 4–1 defeat to the Toronto Maple Leafs on April 29, 2021.

==== Seattle Kraken ====
On July 21, 2021, Lind was selected from the Canucks at the 2021 NHL expansion draft by the Seattle Kraken. Lind was originally assigned to their AHL affiliate, the Charlotte Checkers, before being recalled on October 13 due to injuries in the lineup. During his call-up, Lind tallied his first NHL assist and recorded two hits in a 4–3 win over the Edmonton Oilers on December 4. He remained with the Kraken and later scored his first career NHL goal on April 1, 2022, in a 5–2 loss to the Vegas Golden Knights.

As a restricted free agent in the off-season, Lind was tendered a qualifying offer and signed to a one-year, two-way contract extension with the Kraken on July 21, 2022.

==== Dallas Stars ====
On July 1, 2024, Lind signed as a free agent to a one-year, two-way contract with the Dallas Stars.

== Career statistics ==
			Regular season					Playoffs
Season	Team	League	GP	G	A	Pts	PIM	GP	G	A	Pts	PIM
2012–13	Swift Current Legionnaires	SMAAAHL	4	3	0	3	4	—	—	—	—	—
2013–14	Saskatoon Contacts	SMAAAHL	44	21	16	37	38	3	0	2	2	2
2014–15	Saskatoon Contacts	SMAAAHL	44	45	34	79	54	5	4	2	6	14
2014–15	Kelowna Rockets	WHL	6	0	1	1	4	7	0	3	3	4
2015–16	Kelowna Rockets	WHL	70	14	27	41	54	16	0	0	0	12
2016–17	Kelowna Rockets	WHL	70	30	57	87	79	17	6	6	12	10
2017–18	Kelowna Rockets	WHL	58	39	56	95	65	4	3	5	8	4
2017–18	Utica Comets	AHL	6	0	1	1	2	—	—	—	—	—
2018–19	Utica Comets	AHL	51	5	12	17	20	—	—	—	—	—
2019–20	Utica Comets	AHL	61	14	30	44	64	—	—	—	—	—
2020–21	Utica Comets	AHL	8	5	3	8	8	—	—	—	—	—
2020–21	Vancouver Canucks	NHL	7	0	0	0	0	—	—	—	—	—
2021–22	Seattle Kraken	NHL	23	2	6	8	12	—	—	—	—	—
2021–22	Charlotte Checkers	AHL	46	17	18	35	106	—	—	—	—	—
2022–23	Coachella Valley Firebirds	AHL	72	30	32	62	91	26	9	22	31	16
2023–24	Coachella Valley Firebirds	AHL	69	17	48	65	65	18	5	6	11	12
2023–24	Seattle Kraken	NHL	1	0	0	0	0	—	—	—	—	—
2024–25	Texas Stars	AHL	71	23	29	52	93	14	8	7	15	18
2025–26	Texas Stars	AHL	70	11	24	35	95	5	2	0	2	6
NHL totals			31	2	6	8	12	—	—	—	—	—
