= Austin Strand =

Canadian ice hockey player (born 1997)

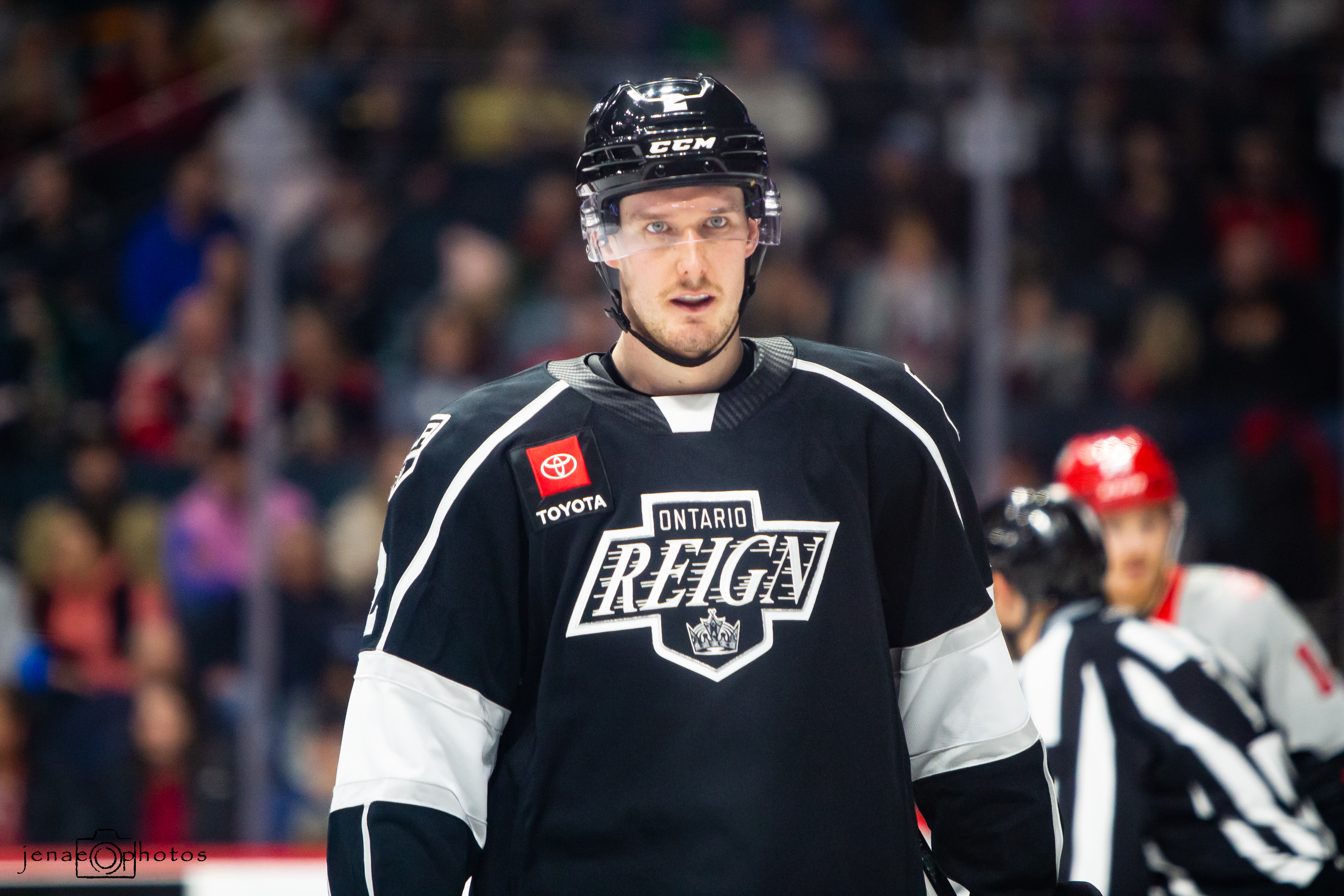
- Strand with the Ontario Reign in 2022
- Born: February 17, 1997 (age 29) Calgary, Alberta, Canada
- Height: 6 ft 3 in (191 cm)
- Weight: 216 lb (98 kg; 15 st 6 lb)
- Position: Defence
- Shoots: Right
- Liiga team Former teams: Ilves; Los Angeles Kings; Anaheim Ducks
- NHL draft: Undrafted
- Playing career: 2018–present

Austin Strand (born February 17, 1997) is a Canadian professional ice hockey defenceman for Ilves in the Finnish Liiga. He previously played for the Los Angeles Kings and Anaheim Ducks in the National Hockey League (NHL).

== Early life ==
Strand was born on February 17, 1997, in Calgary to Leanne and Wade and grew up alongside his older brother Coleton and sister Krysten. Growing up, Strand played with Austin Wagner on the Calgary Bantam AA Blazers for their 2010–11 season before both were promoted to the Bantam AAA Northstar Sabres and Midget AAA Calgary Northstars.

== Playing career ==
=== Major junior ===
Following his time with the Calgary Northstars, Strand was drafted in the third round, 48th overall, by the Red Deer Rebels of the Western Hockey League (WHL). He was subsequently re-assigned to the AAA team for one final season before making his WHL debut in 2014. Strand credited his off-season training, both physically and mentally, as the reason for him joining the lineup. Upon joining the team, Strand recorded his first career WHL goal in a 6–5 overtime loss to the Victoria Royals on October 14, 2014. His development impressed Rebels associate coach Jeff Truitt who said: "He’s really been a guy who has absorbed the information and just taken it to another level." Strand continued to produce offensively and tallied four goals and 13 points through 54 games by March 2015. As such, he began to gain attention from National Hockey League scouts leading up to the 2015 NHL entry draft and earned a 66th mid-term ranking by the NHL Central Scouting Bureau. His final ranking dropped to 101, and he went undrafted in his first year of eligibility.

Strand returned to the Rebels for the 2015–16 season, where he tallied two goals and 11 assists for 13 points. As he remained undrafted, Strand was eligible for the 2016 NHL entry draft and was named to the NHL Central Scouting Bureau Player To Watch List. He maintained a shut-down role with the Rebels throughout the season and finished his campaign as a plus nine. Strand's offensive ability helped push the Rebels to the 2016 Memorial Cup, where they faced the Brandon Wheat Kings.

Strand returned to the Rebels for the 2016–17 season, where he began the season strong; surpassing his previous career-high point total through the first 12 games. He continued to produce for the Rebels and tallied 15 points with 12 penalty minutes through 38 regular season games. In December 2016, Strand was traded to the Seattle Thunderbirds alongside a sixth-round pick in the 2019 Bantam Draft pick in exchange for defenceman Brandon Schuldhaus. Upon joining the Thunderbirds, Strand took up a leadership position, and helped guide the team to the Ed Chynoweth Cup and the 2017 Memorial Cup. After being eliminated from the playoffs, Strand was invited to attend the Edmonton Oilers training camp but was released from his amateur tryout contract on September 14.

In his final major junior season, Strand signed a three-year, entry-level contract with the Los Angeles Kings on November 28, 2017. He finished the season with 25 goals and 39 assists for 64 points through 69 games and was subsequently assigned to the Kings' American Hockey League (AHL) affiliate, the Ontario Reign.

=== Professional ===
Strand immediately joined the Reign to complete the 2017–18 season but did not skate in any games. He returned to the Reign for the 2018–19 season but was loaned to the ECHL's Manchester Monarchs prior to the beginning of the season. He tallied two points in six games with the Monarchs before being recalled to the Reign on November 2. Strand subsequently made his AHL debut with on November 25 and tallied up an assist in a 7–6 overtime win over the Tucson Roadrunners. Strand alternated between the Reign and the Monarchs throughout the first half of his rookie season before he was able to become a mainstay on the Reigns' lineup in the second half.

Near the start of the 2020–21 season, Strand was re-signed by the Kings to a one-year contract. Once the NHL resumed play, Strand was named to the Kings' taxi squad as part of their opening night roster. Strand made his NHL debut on February 5, 2021, in the Kings' 5–2 loss to the Vegas Golden Knights. A few games later, he was fined $3,168.10 for spearing Arizona Coyotes forward Conor Garland during a game.

Following his fourth season within the Kings organization, Strand left as a free agent and was signed to a one-year, two-way contract with the Anaheim Ducks on July 14, 2022. Strand made five scoreless appearance with the Ducks over the opening months of the 2022–23 season, playing mostly with affiliate, the San Diego Gulls. On March, 3, 2023, the Ducks traded Strand to the Buffalo Sabres in exchange for Chase Priskie. He played out the remainder of the season with Sabres affiliate, the Rochester Americans, contributing with one assist through nine regular season games.

As a free agent Strand left the Sabres organization and opted to sign a one-year contract with the lone AHL independent club, the Chicago Wolves, on July 18, 2023. He began the 2023–24 season on the Wolves blueline, registering 4 points through 10 games. On December 11, 2023, Stand was traded by the Wolves to the Rockford IceHogs, the affiliate to the Chicago Blackhawks, in exchange for Zach Jordan.

On July 17, 2024, Strand was re-signed by the IceHogs to a one-year contract extension for the 2024–25 season. Strand made 21 appearances with the IceHogs, registering 4 points from the blueline, before he was traded to the Utica Comets, affiliate of the New Jersey Devils, on January 6, 2025.

As a free agent following 8 professional seasons in North America, Strand signed a one-year contract abroad with Finnish club, Ilves of the Liiga, on June 30, 2026.

== Career statistics ==
			Regular season					Playoffs
Season	Team	League	GP	G	A	Pts	PIM	GP	G	A	Pts	PIM
2010–11	CNHA Blazers	HCBAA	27	3	10	13	34	3	0	0	0	6
2011–12	Calgary Northstar Sabres	AMBHL	33	5	15	20	78	—	—	—	—	—
2012–13	Calgary Northstars	AMHL	32	1	7	8	34	2	0	0	0	8
2013–14	Calgary Northstars	AMHL	35	6	8	14	56	—	—	—	—	—
2014–15	Red Deer Rebels	WHL	54	4	9	13	44	—	—	—	—	—
2015–16	Red Deer Rebels	WHL	71	2	11	13	49	17	2	1	3	13
2016–17	Red Deer Rebels	WHL	38	1	14	15	12	—	—	—	—	—
2016–17	Seattle Thunderbirds	WHL	36	8	9	17	62	20	4	10	14	34
2017–18	Seattle Thunderbirds	WHL	69	25	39	64	75	5	1	2	3	10
2018–19	Ontario Reign	AHL	43	7	11	18	30	—	—	—	—	—
2018–19	Manchester Monarchs	ECHL	9	1	2	3	9	—	—	—	—	—
2019–20	Ontario Reign	AHL	41	8	7	15	30	—	—	—	—	—
2020–21	Los Angeles Kings	NHL	13	0	1	1	8	—	—	—	—	—
2020–21	Ontario Reign	AHL	19	1	4	5	6	—	—	—	—	—
2021–22	Ontario Reign	AHL	32	3	4	7	30	—	—	—	—	—
2021–22	Los Angeles Kings	NHL	8	0	2	2	0	—	—	—	—	—
2022–23	San Diego Gulls	AHL	46	2	6	8	33	—	—	—	—	—
2022–23	Anaheim Ducks	NHL	5	0	0	0	2	—	—	—	—	—
2022–23	Rochester Americans	AHL	9	0	1	1	15	2	0	0	0	0
2023–24	Chicago Wolves	AHL	10	1	3	4	14	—	—	—	—	—
2023–24	Rockford IceHogs	AHL	38	5	5	10	34	4	0	1	1	4
2024–25	Rockford IceHogs	AHL	21	1	3	4	6	—	—	—	—	—
2024–25	Utica Comets	AHL	39	2	12	14	40	—	—	—	—	—
2025–26	Utica Comets	AHL	49	4	12	16	47	—	—	—	—	—
NHL totals			26	0	3	3	10	—	—	—	—	—
