= Keegan Kolesar =

Canadian ice hockey player (born 1997)

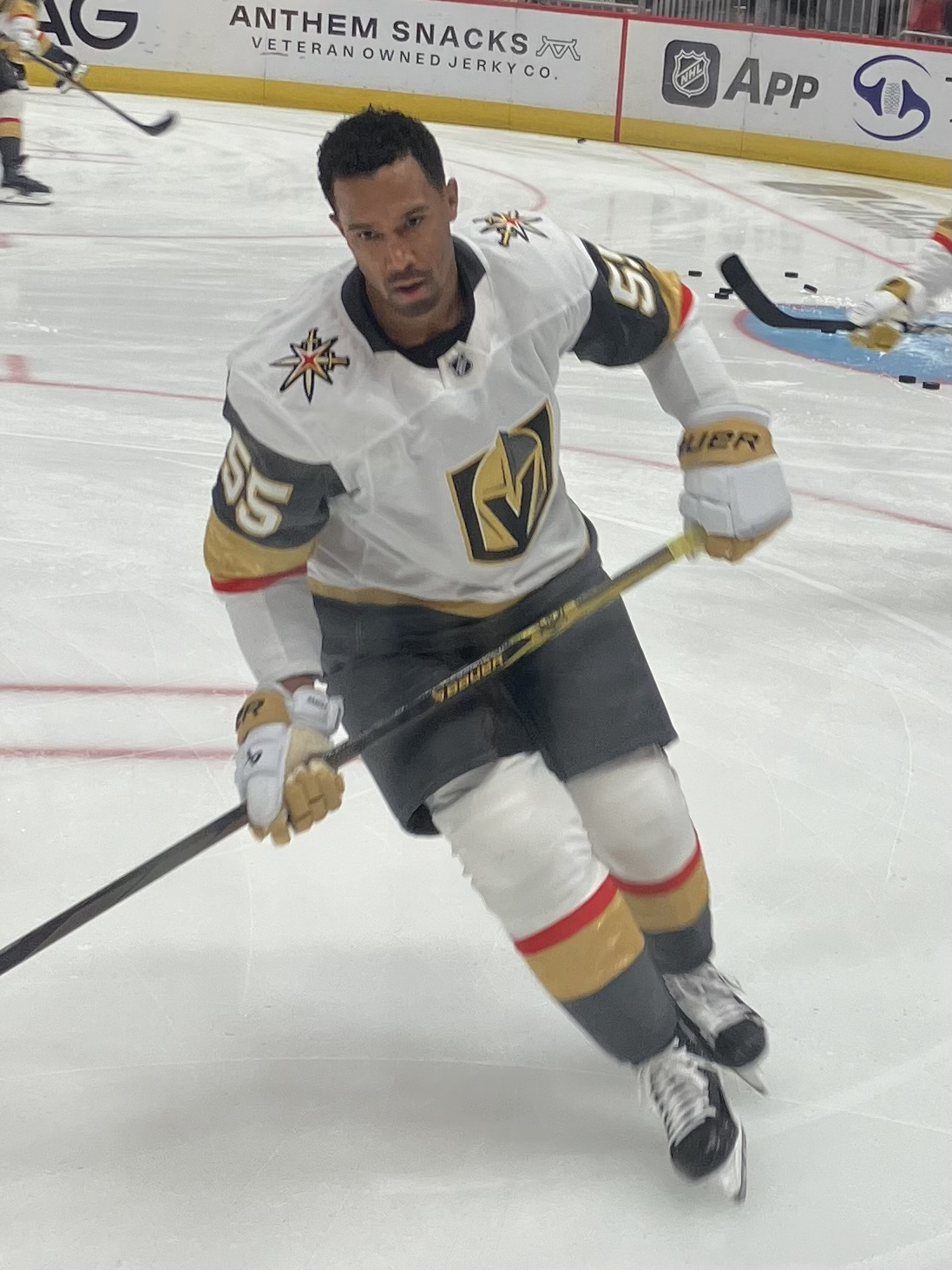
- Kolesar with the Vegas Golden Knights in 2024.
- Born: April 8, 1997 (age 29) Brandon, Manitoba, Canada
- Height: 6 ft 2 in (188 cm)
- Weight: 216 lb (98 kg; 15 st 6 lb)
- Position: Right wing
- Shoots: Right
- NHL team Former teams: Detroit Red Wings; Vegas Golden Knights
- NHL draft: 69th overall, 2015; Columbus Blue Jackets
- Playing career: 2017–present

Keegan Kolesar (born April 8, 1997) is a Canadian professional ice hockey player who is a right winger for the Detroit Red Wings of the National Hockey League (NHL). Kolesar won the Stanley Cup in 2023 while with the Vegas Golden Knights.

== Playing career ==
Kolesar was drafted 69th overall in the 2015 NHL entry draft by the Columbus Blue Jackets. On June 24, 2017, Kolesar was traded to the Vegas Golden Knights in exchange for Vegas' second-round draft pick in the 2017 NHL entry draft. He was called up to the Golden Knights on January 10, 2020, and made his NHL debut the following night against the Blue Jackets.

On March 22, 2021, Kolesar scored his first NHL goal in the third period of the Golden Knights' 5–1 win against the St. Louis Blues.

On June 13, 2023, Kolesar won his first Stanley Cup, with Vegas defeating the Florida Panthers 9-3 to win their first championship in franchise history.

On December 13, 2024, during the 2024–25 season, and as a pending free agent, Kolesar signed a three-year extension with the Golden Knights, keeping him in Vegas through the 2027–28 season.

On July 1, 2026, Kolesar was traded to the Detroit Red Wings, in exchange for a seventh-round pick in 2027 and a third-round pick in 2029.

== Personal life ==
Kolesar was born on April 8, 1997, in Brandon, Manitoba to former NFL and CFL linebacker K. D. Williams and Corrinne Kolesar. The parents divorced following his birth and Corrinne remarried to Charles Peterson, who played baseball for the Kansas City T-Bones of the Northern League. During the 2019–20 NHL season, Peterson contracted COVID-19. When Peterson's death became imminent in mid-September 2020, Kolesar left his team's bubble to say goodbye to his stepfather.

== Career statistics ==
=== Regular season and playoffs ===
			Regular season					Playoffs
Season	Team	League	GP	G	A	Pts	PIM	GP	G	A	Pts	PIM
2012–13	Seattle Thunderbirds	WHL	1	0	0	0	0	2	0	0	0	0
2013–14	Seattle Thunderbirds	WHL	60	2	6	8	45	9	0	2	2	2
2014–15	Seattle Thunderbirds	WHL	64	19	19	38	85	—	—	—	—	—
2015–16	Seattle Thunderbirds	WHL	64	30	31	61	107	16	7	8	15	8
2016–17	Seattle Thunderbirds	WHL	54	26	34	60	101	19	12	19	31	37
2017–18	Quad City Mallards	ECHL	20	9	7	16	10	—	—	—	—	—
2017–18	Chicago Wolves	AHL	44	5	8	13	46	3	1	0	1	0
2018–19	Chicago Wolves	AHL	74	20	16	36	90	21	6	5	11	48
2019–20	Chicago Wolves	AHL	33	3	15	18	21	—	—	—	—	—
2019–20	Vegas Golden Knights	NHL	1	0	0	0	0	—	—	—	—	—
2020–21	Vegas Golden Knights	NHL	44	3	10	13	30	17	1	3	4	4
2021–22	Vegas Golden Knights	NHL	77	7	17	24	68	—	—	—	—	—
2022–23	Vegas Golden Knights	NHL	74	8	10	18	68	22	2	3	5	50
2023–24	Vegas Golden Knights	NHL	79	8	10	18	49	6	0	0	0	2
2024–25	Vegas Golden Knights	NHL	82	12	18	30	53	11	0	1	1	6
2025–26	Vegas Golden Knights	NHL	82	6	11	17	55	21	1	0	1	6
NHL totals			439	44	76	120	323	77	4	7	11	68

=== International ===
Year	Team	Event	Result	GP	G	A	Pts	PIM
2014	Canada Western	U17	9th	5	2	2	4	2
Junior totals				5	2	2	4	2

== Awards and honours ==
Award	Year
NHL
Stanley Cup champion	2023
