= Eetu Tuulola =

Finnish ice hockey player

- Born: 17 March 1998 (age 28) Hämeenlinna, Finland
- Height: 6 ft 3 in (191 cm)
- Weight: 102 kg (225 lb; 16 st 1 lb)
- Position: Right wing
- Shoots: Right
- Liiga team Former teams: HPK; SaiPa; Ilves
- NHL draft: 156th overall, 2016; Calgary Flames
- Playing career: 2015–present

Eetu Tuulola (born 17 March 1998) is a Finnish professional ice hockey forward currently playing under contract with HPK of the Liiga. He was selected by the Calgary Flames in the sixth round, 156th overall, of the 2016 NHL entry draft.

== Playing career ==
Tuulola made his professional debut as a 17-year old with HPK during the 2015–16, collecting 1 assist in 10 games. Following his selection by the Flames at the 2016 NHL Entry Draft, Tuulola moved to North America to play major junior hockey with the Everett Silvertips of the Western Hockey League in the 2016–17 season. He signed with the Silvertips after he was originally selected by the club at the 2016 CHL Import Draft.

Tuulola contributed with 18 goals and 31 points in 62 games with the Silvertips, before opting to return to Finland to resume his professional career with HPK for the 2017–18 season. On December 7, 2017, Tuulola was signed to a two-year contract extension to remain with HPK through to 2020. In 60 games during the 2018–19 season, he contributed a career high marker with 23 assists for 36 points. He recorded 6 points in 18 playoff games to help HPK claim the Championship.

On 13 June 2019, Tuulola was signed to a three-year, entry-level contract with the Calgary Flames.

On 23 September 2020, with the 2020–21 North American season delayed due to the COVID-19 pandemic, Tuulola was loaned by the Flames to resume playing in the Swedish HockeyAllsvenskan, with Västerviks IK. He made 11 appearances in the Swedish second-tier league, collecting 4 points, before leaving after securing a loan in his native Finland, with Liiga club SaiPa, on 16 November 2020. Tuulola was scoreless in 4 games with SaiPa before his loan agreement ended, returning to North America to join the Flames' training camp.

At the conclusion of his entry-level deal with the Flames, Tuulola as an impending restricted free agent opted to return to Finland in agreeing to a one-year contract with Ilves of the Liiga on 23 June 2022.

== Career statistics ==
=== Regular season and playoffs ===
			Regular season					Playoffs
Season	Team	League	GP	G	A	Pts	PIM	GP	G	A	Pts	PIM
2014–15	HPK	Jr. A	33	21	7	28	30	11	2	7	9	14
2015–16	HPK	Jr. A	29	9	5	14	22	6	0	1	1	27
2015–16	HPK	Liiga	10	0	1	1	0	—	—	—	—	—
2016–17	Everett Silvertips	WHL	62	18	13	31	34	10	6	1	7	4
2017–18	HPK	Liiga	51	16	10	26	34	—	—	—	—	—
2017–18	HPK	Jr. A	—	—	—	—	—	5	1	0	1	2
2018–19	HPK	Liiga	60	13	23	36	44	18	3	3	6	8
2019–20	Stockton Heat	AHL	50	10	13	23	23	—	—	—	—	—
2020–21	Västerviks IK	Allsv	11	2	2	4	2	—	—	—	—	—
2020–21	SaiPa	Liiga	4	0	0	0	2	—	—	—	—	—
2020–21	Stockton Heat	AHL	29	3	4	7	12	—	—	—	—	—
2021–22	Stockton Heat	AHL	61	14	11	25	50	13	3	1	4	4
2022–23	Ilves	Liiga	54	5	9	14	89	8	0	0	0	0
2023–24	HPK	Liiga	52	12	11	23	32	—	—	—	—	—
Liiga totals			231	46	54	100	201	26	3	3	6	8

=== International ===
Year	Team	Event	Result	GP	G	A	Pts	PIM
2014	Finland	U17	4th	6	1	1	2	4
2015	Finland	IH18	4th	5	2	2	4	2
2016	Finland	U18	1st place, gold medalist(s)	7	2	2	4	0
2018	Finland	WJC	6th	3	0	0	0	0
Junior totals				21	5	5	10	6

== Awards & honors ==
Award	Year
Liiga
Champion (HPK)	2019
