= John Dahlström =

Swedish ice hockey player

- Born: 22 January 1997 (age 29) Kungsbacka, Sweden
- Height: 6 ft 1 in (185 cm)
- Weight: 190 lb (86 kg; 13 st 8 lb)
- Position: Winger
- Shoots: Left
- Allsv team Former teams: Djurgårdens IF; Frölunda HC; IK Oskarshamn; Växjö Lakers
- NHL draft: 211th overall, 2015; Chicago Blackhawks
- Playing career: 2015–present

John Dahlström (born 22 January 1997) is a Swedish professional ice hockey winger. He is currently playing under contract with Djurgårdens IF Hockey of the HockeyAllsvenskan (Allsv).

== Playing career ==
Dahlström made his Swedish Hockey League debut playing with Frölunda HC during the 2014–15 SHL season. He was the last player picked in the 2015 NHL entry draft, 211th overall by the Chicago Blackhawks. After two seasons within the SHL, Dahlström opted to play major junior hockey in North America in order to pursue his NHL ambitions. He was drafted 76th overall in the CHL import draft by the Medicine Hat Tigers of the Western Hockey League (WHL) and agreed to a contract on July 22, 2016.

In the 2016–17 season, Dahlström established himself amongst Medicine Hat's scoring lines with 30 goals and 59 points in 63 games. Without a contract offer from the Blackhawks, Dahlström opted to return to Sweden in signing a two-year contract with second tier, Almtuna IS of the HockeyAllsvenskan, on June 22, 2017.

== Career statistics ==
=== Regular season and playoffs ===
			Regular season					Playoffs
Season	Team	League	GP	G	A	Pts	PIM	GP	G	A	Pts	PIM
2014–15	Frölunda HC	J20	28	20	250	35	2	8	5	0	5	0
2014–15	Frölunda HC	SHL	2	0	0	0	0	—	—	—	—	—
2015–16	Frölunda HC	J20	38	21	14	35	8	4	4	1	5	0
2015–16	Frölunda HC	SHL	13	0	1	1	0	—	—	—	—	—
2015–16	HC Vita Hästen	Allsv	2	0	0	0	0	—	—	—	—	—
2016–17	Medicine Hat Tigers	WHL	63	30	29	59	12	11	6	7	13	4
2017–18	Almtuna IS	Allsv	28	3	4	7	8	—	—	—	—	—
2017–18	Wings HC Arlanda	Div.1	2	1	0	1	0	—	—	—	—	—
2017–18	Hudiksvalls HC	Div.1	3	1	1	2	0	—	—	—	—	—
2017–18	IK Oskarshamn	Allsv	13	5	3	8	6	8	2	1	3	2
2018–19	IK Oskarshamn	Allsv	48	6	8	14	10	12	5	1	6	6
2019–20	IK Oskarshamn	SHL	52	3	8	11	8	—	—	—	—	—
2020–21	IK Oskarshamn	SHL	52	16	5	21	4	—	—	—	—	—
2021–22	IK Oskarshamn	SHL	52	5	14	19	0	10	0	1	1	4
2022–23	IK Oskarshamn	SHL	52	3	6	9	2	3	0	0	0	0
2023–24	Växjö Lakers	SHL	6	1	0	1	0	—	—	—	—	—
2023–24	Djurgårdens IF	Allsv	11	1	1	2	0	2	0	0	0	0
SHL totals			229	28	34	62	14	13	0	1	1	4

=== International ===
Year	Team	Event	Result	GP	G	A	Pts	PIM
2014	Sweden	U17	6th	4	2	3	5	2
2014	Sweden	IH18	4th	5	0	2	2	0
2015	Sweden	U18	8th	5	0	1	1	0
Junior totals				14	2	6	8	2
