= Glenn Gawdin =

Canadian ice hockey player (born 1997)

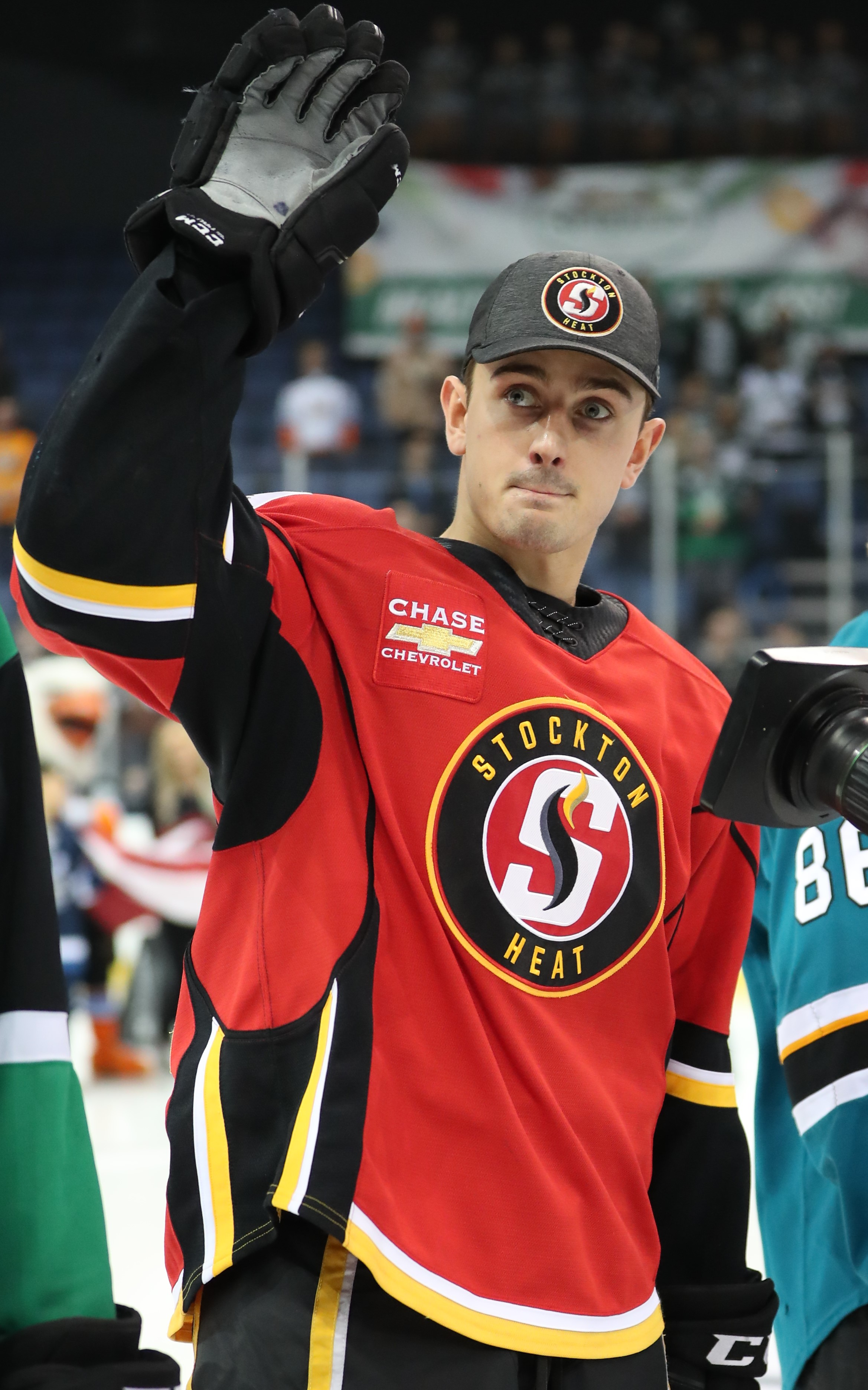
- Gawdin with the Stockton Heat in 2020
- Born: March 25, 1997 (age 29) Richmond, British Columbia, Canada
- Height: 6 ft 1 in (185 cm)
- Weight: 195 lb (88 kg; 13 st 13 lb)
- Position: Centre
- Shoots: Right
- NHL team Former teams: New York Rangers; Calgary Flames; Anaheim Ducks
- NHL draft: 116th overall, 2015; St. Louis Blues
- Playing career: 2018–present

Glenn Gawdin (born March 25, 1997) is a Canadian professional ice hockey centre for the New York Rangers of the National Hockey League (NHL). He was selected by the St. Louis Blues in the fourth-round (116th overall) of the 2015 NHL entry draft.

== Playing career ==
=== Major junior ===
Growing up in Richmond, British Columbia, Gawdin began playing hockey through the Seafair Minor Hockey Association. In 2009, Gawdin played with the minor ice hockey team, the Richmond Blues, as they competed in the Pacific Coast Amateur Hockey Association playoffs. He scored a hat-trick and was later named PeeWee-A MVP. Gawdin was allowed to bypass minor hockey a year early to play with the Seafair Islanders Midget A1 team.

At the age of 15, Gawdin played major midget hockey with the Greater Vancouver Canadians while studying at McRoberts Secondary School. That year, he was drafted fifth overall by the Swift Current Broncos in the 2012 WHL bantam draft and became the first Broncos player from his draft class to sign with the team. During the 2012–13 season, he played two games with the Swift Current Broncos after scoring 25 points in 18 games with the Greater Vancouver Canadians. The following season, Gawdin became a mainstay on the Broncos line up where he put up 22 points in 66 games as a rookie. He recorded his first WHL point with an assist on Julius Honka's first WHL goal on September 19, 2013, against the Regina Pats.

The St. Louis Blues selected Gawdin in the 4th round (116th overall) of the 2015 NHL entry draft, making him the first Richmond product to be drafted in an NHL entry draft since Raymond Sawada in 2004.

Prior to the 2016–17 season, Gawdin attended the St. Louis Blues training camp. He returned to the WHL without an NHL contract and was named captain of the Broncos. At the conclusion of the season, Gawdin was voted Team MVP.

On November 16, 2017, Gawdin signed a three-year entry-level contract with the Calgary Flames after attending their training camp. He returned to the WHL for the 2017–18 WHL season as an overage player, where he scored 56 goals and 69 assists as the Broncos qualified for the 2018 Memorial Cup. His 125 points were the second-highest total in the WHL, behind Jayden Halbgewachs of the Moose Jaw Warriors. He was named WHL Player of the Month for February and selected for the WHL (East) First All-Star Team. After leading the Broncos to the 2018 WHL Championship, Gawdin was named WHL Playoffs MVP. Two days later, Gawdin was named CHL Player of the Week for the first time. At the end of the season, Gawdin revealed that he had played through a shoulder injury.

=== Professional ===
After attending the Calgary Flames 2018 training camp, Gawdin was reassigned to their American Hockey League (AHL) affiliate, the Stockton Heat. He made the Heat's opening night roster for the 2018–19 season and recorded his first professional goal in a 6–5 loss to the Ontario Reign on October 6. He was awarded the Junior Male Athlete Award by the Richmond Sports Council on April 26, 2019. In the 2019–20 season Gawdin again played for Stockton and was named their representative to the AHL All-Star Classic. He was recalled from Stockton in the 2020–21 season and made his debut with the Calgary Flames on February 20, 2021. Following his debut, he made six more appearances with the Flames and spent time with their taxi squad before being returned to Stockton. In his sixth game, a 6–1 win over the Ottawa Senators on May 9, 2021, Gawdin registered his first NHL point; an assist on Michael Stone's goal. During the 2021–22 season, Gawdin appeared in two more games with the Flames, going pointless, while spending the rest of the season with the Heat.

As an unrestricted free agent from the Flames after four seasons, Gawdin was signed to a two-year, $1.525 million contract with the Anaheim Ducks on July 13, 2022. He was assigned to Anaheim's AHL affiliate, the San Diego Gulls, to start the season. He was recalled in November and made his Ducks' debut on November 6, 2022 against the Florida Panthers. He played in two more games with Anaheim before being returned to San Diego on November 14. Gawdin spend the majority of the 2023–24 season with the Gulls. After a series of trades left the Ducks shorthanded, Gawdin was recalled by Anaheim on March 6, 2024 while leading the Gulls in goals and second in points. He made his NHL season debut that night in a 2–1 win over the Ottawa Senators. Gawdin was returned to San Diego on March 8.

After two seasons within the Ducks organization, Gawdin left as a free agent to sign a two-year, two-way contract with the Los Angeles Kings on July 1, 2024. After going unclaimed on waivers, Gawdin was assigned to the Kings' AHL affiliate, the Ontario Reign, for the 2024–25 season.

As a free agent after two seasons within the Kings organization, Gawdin was signed to a two-year, two-way contract with the New York Rangers on July 1, 2026. In his second game after being recalled from the Hartford Wolf Pack, he scored the first two goals of his NHL career in a 5–1 away win over the Vancouver Canucks on 13 November.

== International play ==
Gawdin has represented Team British Columbia at the 2012 Western Canada U16 Challenge Cup where he won a gold medal. He later competed with Team Pacific at the 2014 World U-17 Hockey Challenge where he helped them win silver. The following year, Gawdin was named to Team Canada's junior team to compete in the 2015 IIHF World U18 Championships.

== Personal life ==
Gawdin was born on March 25, 1997, to parents Bryan and Yvonne. His father Bryan died in 2022.

Gawdin played both ice hockey and lacrosse growing up. He competed with the Team BC Bantam lacrosse team.

== Career statistics ==
=== Regular season and playoffs ===
| | | | Regular season | | | | | Playoffs |
| Season | Team | League | GP | G | A | Pts | PIM | GP | G | A | Pts | PIM |
|---|---|---|---|---|---|---|---|---|---|---|---|---|
| 2012–13 | Greater Vancouver Canadians | BCMML | 37 | 17 | 29 | 46 | 49 | 6 | 7 | 4 | 11 | 14 |
| 2012–13 | Swift Current Broncos | WHL | 2 | 0 | 0 | 0 | 0 | — | — | — | — | — |
| 2013–14 | Swift Current Broncos | WHL | 66 | 10 | 12 | 22 | 34 | 6 | 0 | 0 | 0 | 2 |
| 2014–15 | Swift Current Broncos | WHL | 72 | 15 | 39 | 54 | 59 | 4 | 1 | 1 | 2 | 0 |
| 2015–16 | Swift Current Broncos | WHL | 53 | 19 | 34 | 53 | 63 | — | — | — | — | — |
| 2016–17 | Swift Current Broncos | WHL | 52 | 26 | 33 | 59 | 80 | 14 | 6 | 5 | 11 | 18 |
| 2017–18 | Swift Current Broncos | WHL | 67 | 56 | 69 | 125 | 101 | 20 | 9 | 17 | 26 | 24 |
| 2018–19 | Stockton Heat | AHL | 64 | 11 | 27 | 38 | 59 | — | — | — | — | — |
| 2019–20 | Stockton Heat | AHL | 53 | 16 | 31 | 47 | 28 | — | — | — | — | — |
| 2020–21 | EHC Visp | SL | 1 | 0 | 0 | 0 | 0 | — | — | — | — | — |
| 2020–21 | Stockton Heat | AHL | 22 | 4 | 9 | 13 | 23 | — | — | — | — | — |
| 2020–21 | Calgary Flames | NHL | 7 | 0 | 1 | 1 | 0 | — | — | — | — | — |
| 2021–22 | Stockton Heat | AHL | 62 | 15 | 35 | 50 | 75 | 10 | 3 | 3 | 6 | 4 |
| 2021–22 | Calgary Flames | NHL | 2 | 0 | 0 | 0 | 2 | — | — | — | — | — |
| 2022–23 | San Diego Gulls | AHL | 57 | 17 | 16 | 33 | 49 | — | — | — | — | — |
| 2022–23 | Anaheim Ducks | NHL | 3 | 0 | 0 | 0 | 0 | — | — | — | — | — |
| 2023–24 | San Diego Gulls | AHL | 70 | 22 | 33 | 55 | 53 | — | — | — | — | — |
| 2023–24 | Anaheim Ducks | NHL | 1 | 0 | 0 | 0 | 2 | — | — | — | — | — |
| 2024–25 | Ontario Reign | AHL | 72 | 26 | 36 | 62 | 57 | 2 | 0 | 1 | 1 | 0 |
| 2025–26 | Ontario Reign | AHL | 71 | 16 | 35 | 51 | 73 | 5 | 1 | 1 | 2 | 4 |
| NHL totals | | | 13 | 0 | 1 | 1 | 4 | — | — | — | — | — |

=== International ===
| Year | Team | Event | Result | GP | G | A | Pts | PIM |
|---|---|---|---|---|---|---|---|---|
| 2014 | Canada Pacific | U17 | 2nd place, silver medalist(s) | 6 | 3 | 3 | 6 | 0 |
| 2015 | Canada | U18 | 3rd place, bronze medalist(s) | 7 | 2 | 2 | 4 | 4 |
| Junior totals | | | | 13 | 5 | 5 | 10 | 4 |

== Awards and honours ==
| Award | Year | Ref |
WHL
| WHL (East) First All-Star Team | 2018 | |
| WHL Playoffs MVP | 2018 | |
| Swift Current Broncos Julie Forst Memorial MVP Award | 2017, 2018 | |
| WHL Plus-Minus Award | 2018 | |
