= Filip Ahl =

Swedish professional ice hockey forward

- Born: 12 June 1997 (age 29) Jönköping, Sweden
- Height: 6 ft 3 in (191 cm)
- Weight: 211 lb (96 kg; 15 st 1 lb)
- Position: Forward
- Shoots: Left
- Slovak team Former teams: HK Dukla Trenčín; HV71; Örebro HK; Bratislava Capitals; Orli Znojmo; HC Pustertal Wölfe
- NHL draft: 109th overall, 2015; Ottawa Senators
- Playing career: 2014–present

Filip Ahl (born 12 June 1997) is a Swedish professional ice hockey forward who is currently playing for HK Dukla Trenčín of the Slovak Extraliga.

He was chosen in the 2015 NHL entry draft by the Ottawa Senators.

== Playing career ==
Ahl made his Swedish Hockey League debut playing with HV71 during the 2013–14 SHL season. At 16 years of age, Ahl became the youngest player to ever appear with HV71, the ninth youngest in SHL history. Following the 2014–15 season, Ahl was signed to a two-year contract extension by HV71 on May 8, 2015.

In 2016, Ahl came to Canada to play one season with the Regina Pats junior team. Ahl had a good season, scoring 28 goals and 48 total points and the Pats team made it to the WHL finals. Ahl attended the Senators' development camp in the summer, but Ahl did not sign with the Senators and signed instead with Örebro HK. The Senators retain his NHL rights for one more season, when he can become a free agent.

Un-signed from the Senators, Ahl left Örebro HK after the 2017–18 season, signing a one-year contract with second tier club, Tingsryds AIF of the Allsvenskan, on 1 May 2018.

== Career statistics ==
=== Regular season and playoffs ===
			Regular season					Playoffs
Season	Team	League	GP	G	A	Pts	PIM	GP	G	A	Pts	PIM
2011–12	HV71	J18	1	0	1	1	0	—	—	—	—	—
2011–12	HV71	J18 Allsv	5	0	0	0	0	—	—	—	—	—
2012–13	HV71	J18	17	2	10	12	10	—	—	—	—	—
2012–13	HV71	J18 Allsv	16	8	6	14	35	—	—	—	—	—
2012–13	HV71	J20	1	1	0	1	2	—	—	—	—	—
2013–14	HV71	J18	6	6	4	10	6	—	—	—	—	—
2013–14	HV71	J18 Allsv	3	3	2	5	0	—	—	—	—	—
2013–14	HV71	J20	24	10	9	19	10	5	2	2	4	2
2013–14	HV71	SHL	1	0	0	0	0	2	0	0	0	0
2014–15	HV71	J18	1	0	1	1	0	—	—	—	—	—
2014–15	HV71	J20	34	20	22	42	53	6	3	2	5	4
2014–15	HV71	SHL	15	0	2	2	2	—	—	—	—	—
2014–15	HV71	J18 Allsv	—	—	—	—	—	4	5	4	9	0
2015–16	HV71	J20	18	18	13	31	14	—	—	—	—	—
2015–16	HV71	SHL	17	0	0	0	0	—	—	—	—	—
2015–16	Asplöven HC	Allsv	3	0	0	0	2	—	—	—	—	—
2015–16	HC Dalen	SWE.3	1	1	0	1	0	—	—	—	—	—
2015–16	IF Sundsvall	Allsv	16	4	2	6	6	—	—	—	—	—
2016–17	Regina Pats	WHL	54	28	20	48	26	20	5	13	18	26
2017–18	Örebro HK	J20	5	7	1	8	2	—	—	—	—	—
2017–18	Örebro HK	SHL	15	0	1	1	4	—	—	—	—	—
2017–18	BIK Karlskoga	Allsv	29	11	4	15	14	—	—	—	—	—
2018–19	Tingsryds AIF	Allsv	42	11	9	20	37	—	—	—	—	—
2019–20	BIK Karlskoga	Allsv	40	17	23	40	22	—	—	—	—	—
2019–20	Södertälje SK	Allsv	10	3	3	6	6	1	0	0	0	0
2020–21	Bratislava Capitals	ICEHL	34	8	21	29	20	5	0	0	0	2
2021–22	Orli Znojmo	ICEHL	34	17	19	36	24	6	1	4	5	4
2022–23	Pustertal Wölfe	ICEHL	46	17	18	35	26	—	—	—	—	—
SHL totals			48	0	3	3	6	2	0	0	0	0

=== International ===
Year	Team	Event	Result	GP	G	A	Pts	PIM
2014	Sweden	U17	6th	5	2	2	4	4
2014	Sweden	IH18	4th	5	0	2	2	27
2015	Sweden	WJC18	8th	5	0	3	3	16
2017	Sweden	WJC	4th	7	0	2	2	2
Junior totals				22	2	9	11	49
