= Ethan Bear =

Canadian ice hockey player (born 1997)

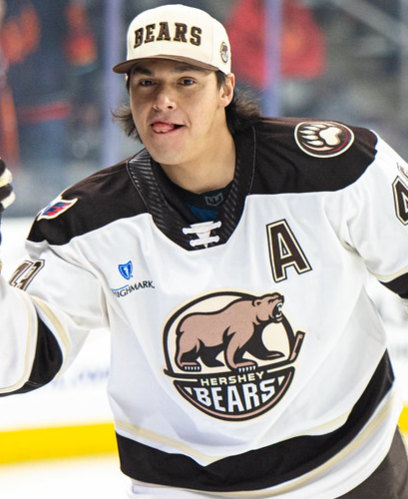
- Bear in 2025
- Born: June 26, 1997 (age 29) Regina, Saskatchewan, Canada
- Height: 5 ft 11 in (180 cm)
- Weight: 219 lb (99 kg; 15 st 9 lb)
- Position: Defence
- Shoots: Right
- NHL team (P) Cur. team Former teams: New York Islanders; Hamilton Hammers (AHL); Edmonton Oilers; Carolina Hurricanes; Vancouver Canucks; Washington Capitals
- National team: Canada
- NHL draft: 124th overall, 2015; Edmonton Oilers
- Playing career: 2017–present

Ethan Bear (born June 26, 1997) is a Cree and Canadian professional ice hockey player who is a defenceman for the Hamilton Hammers in the American Hockey League (AHL) while under contract to the New York Islanders of the National Hockey League (NHL). He was drafted in the fifth round, 124th overall, by the Edmonton Oilers in the 2015 NHL entry draft. He represents Canada internationally, and won the gold medal at the 2023 IIHF World Championship.

== Playing career ==
Bear was drafted in the fifth round in the 2015 NHL entry draft by the Edmonton Oilers from the Seattle Thunderbirds of the Western Hockey League (WHL). He was signed to a three-year, entry-level contract with the Oilers on July 2, 2016. Bear made his NHL debut on March 1, 2018, in a game against the Nashville Predators. He recorded his first NHL goal in a 5–4 overtime loss to the Anaheim Ducks on March 25, 2018.

Bear was the first player to wear a jersey with his name written in Cree syllabics (ᒪᐢᑲᐧ; Maskwa) during an exhibition match against the Calgary Flames on July 28, 2020.

On December 28, 2020, Bear signed a two-year, $4 million contract extension with the Oilers.

After his fourth year within the Oilers organization, Bear was traded to the Carolina Hurricanes in exchange for Warren Foegele on July 28, 2021. In the following 2021–22 season, Bear tied a career-high with five goals and added nine assists for 14 points through 58 regular season games. Struggling to fully adjust to the Hurricanes' system, Bear was a healthy scratch through two rounds of the playoffs.

As a restricted free agent in the off-season, Bear was re-signed by the Hurricanes to a one-year, $2.2 million contract on July 28, 2022. Beginning the 2022–23 season as a healthy scratch, Bear was traded by the Hurricanes alongside Lane Pederson to the Vancouver Canucks in exchange for a 2023 fifth-round pick. In 2023, Bear joined the NHL Player Inclusion Coalition.

After injuring his shoulder while playing in the 2023 IIHF World Championship, Bear had to rest for six months after receiving surgery. Following the surgery, he was not issued a qualifying offer by the Canucks. As Bear emerged from his recovery as an unrestricted free agent, Canucks insider Chris Johnston reported that, alongside the Canucks, the Washington Capitals and the Toronto Maple Leafs expressed interest in signing him. An unnamed source told Postmedia that the Canucks' available cap space stopped them from re-signing Bear for the 2023–24 season. Bear signed a two-year, $4.125 million contract with the Washington Capitals on December 28, 2023. He debuted for the Capitals on December 30, 2023, against the Nashville Predators.

After playing 24 games with Washington, Bear entered the NHL/NHLPA player assistance program in March 2024. He was cleared to return to the team at the end of April. On October 3, 2024, the Capitals placed Bear on waivers. After clearing waivers, Bear began the 2024–25 season playing with the Capitals’ AHL affiliate, the Hershey Bears. Appearing in 62 games, he led Hershey in scoring with 46 points, and tied for the league lead in plus minus rating (+33). In recognition of his play, Bear was named to the Second All-Star Team.

Having left the Capitals as a free agent, Bear was signed to a one-year, two-way contract with the New York Islanders for the 2025–26 season on July 1, 2025.

== International play ==
Medal record

Representing Canada

Ice hockey

World Championships
Gold medal – first place	2023 Finland/Latvia	

On May 5, 2023, Bear was named to Canada men's national ice hockey team at the 2023 IIHF World Championship, where he was scoreless in eight games. He won a gold medal, although a slash from Kasperi Kapanen at the end of the quarterfinal against Finland forced him to miss his team's final two games.

== Personal life ==
Bear was born in Regina, Saskatchewan. Of Cree descent, he was raised on the Ochapowace Nation near Whitewood, Saskatchewan. His older brother, Everett, also played hockey. While growing up, he faced racism from hockey fans who stereotyped him as a "lazy" player which motivated him to work harder. He drew inspiration from his brother and other Indigenous hockey players, including Carey Price, Jordin Tootoo, Brandon Montour, Arron Asham, and Micheal Ferland. In the summer, he runs a youth hockey camp in Ochapowace.

In October 2021, Bear and Lenasia Ned got engaged. In January 2023, Ned gave birth to their first child, a daughter. The couple married in Kelowna, British Columbia, in July 2023. They welcomed a second daughter in July 2024.

== Career statistics ==
=== Regular season and playoffs ===
			Regular season					Playoffs
Season	Team	League	GP	G	A	Pts	PIM	GP	G	A	Pts	PIM
2012–13	Yorkton Harvest	SMHL	38	7	28	35	30	5	1	1	2	0
2012–13	Seattle Thunderbirds	WHL	1	0	0	0	0	—	—	—	—	—
2013–14	Seattle Thunderbirds	WHL	58	6	13	19	18	9	2	2	4	6
2014–15	Seattle Thunderbirds	WHL	69	13	25	38	23	6	1	2	3	0
2015–16	Seattle Thunderbirds	WHL	69	19	46	65	33	18	8	14	22	8
2016–17	Seattle Thunderbirds	WHL	67	28	42	70	21	17	6	20	26	12
2017–18	Bakersfield Condors	AHL	37	6	12	18	12	—	—	—	—	—
2017–18	Edmonton Oilers	NHL	18	1	3	4	10	—	—	—	—	—
2018–19	Bakersfield Condors	AHL	52	6	25	31	34	8	2	2	4	4
2019–20	Edmonton Oilers	NHL	71	5	16	21	33	4	0	0	0	0
2020–21	Edmonton Oilers	NHL	43	2	6	8	14	4	0	0	0	2
2021–22	Carolina Hurricanes	NHL	58	5	9	14	20	—	—	—	—	—
2022–23	Vancouver Canucks	NHL	61	3	13	16	25	—	—	—	—	—
2023–24	Washington Capitals	NHL	24	1	3	4	10	—	—	—	—	—
2024–25	Hershey Bears	AHL	62	10	36	46	30	2	0	0	0	2
2025–26	Bridgeport Islanders	AHL	40	4	23	27	14	2	0	0	0	0
NHL totals			275	17	50	67	112	8	0	0	0	2

=== International ===
Year	Team	Event	Result	GP	G	A	Pts	PIM
2014	Canada Western	U17	9th	5	0	1	1	0
2014	Canada	IH18	1st place, gold medalist(s)	5	1	1	2	2
2015	Canada	U18	3rd place, bronze medalist(s)	7	0	3	3	6
2023	Canada	WC	1st place, gold medalist(s)	8	0	0	0	4
Junior totals				17	1	5	6	8
Senior totals				8	0	0	0	4

== Awards and honours ==
Award	Year
SMHL
First All-Star Team	2013
WHL
West First All-Star Team	2016, 2017
Bill Hunter Memorial Trophy	2017
AHL
Second All-Star Team	2024–25
