= 2016–17 WHL season =

51st season of the Western Hockey League

- League: Western Hockey League
- Sport: Hockey
- Duration: Regular season September 23, 2016 – March 19, 2017; Playoffs; March 24, 2017 – May 14, 2017
- Teams: 22
- TV partner(s): Shaw TV, Rogers Sportsnet, This TV

Regular season
- Scotty Munro Memorial Trophy: Regina Pats (2)
- Season MVP: Sam Steel (Regina Pats)
- Top scorer: Sam Steel (Regina Pats)

Playoffs
- Playoffs MVP: Matthew Barzal (Thunderbirds)
- Finals champions: Seattle Thunderbirds (1)
- Runners-up: Regina Pats

WHL seasons
- 2015–16 2017–18

2016–17 CHL seasons
- League: Canadian Hockey League
- Sport: Hockey
- Duration: OHL; September 2016 – March 2017; QMJHL; September 2016 – March 2017; WHL; September 2016 – March 2017
- Teams: 60
- TV partner(s): TVA Sports, Rogers Sportsnet, Rogers TV, Shaw TV
- Season MVP: Alex DeBrincat (Erie Otters) (OHL)
- Top scorer: Sam Steel (Regina Pats) (WHL)

Memorial Cup
- Finals champions: Windsor Spitfires (OHL) (3rd title)
- Runners-up: Erie Otters (OHL)

The 2016–17 WHL season was the 51st season of the Western Hockey League (WHL). The regular season began on September 23, 2016, and ended on March 19, 2017. The Regina Pats won the Scotty Munro Memorial Trophy for best regular season record for the first time since the 1973-74 season. The playoffs began on March 24, 2017, and ended on May 14, 2017. The Seattle Thunderbirds won their first Ed Chynoweth Cup, defeating Regina in the final, and earned a berth in the 2017 Memorial Cup tournament, which was held at the WFCU Centre in Windsor, Ontario from May 19–28, 2017.

== Standings ==
Map of WHL, 2011–12 to 2018–19
East Division
Central Division
BC Division
US Division

Updated to game(s) played on March 19, 2017. Source: Western Hockey League

East Division: Top 3
Pos	Team	Pld	W	L	OTL	SOL	GF	GA	Pts
1	x, y, z – Regina Pats	72	52	12	7	1	353	211	112
2	x – Moose Jaw Warriors	72	42	21	8	1	255	219	93
3	x – Swift Current Broncos	72	39	23	4	6	247	239	88

x – clinched playoff berth; y – clinched division title; z – clinched conference title

Central Division: Top 3
Pos	Team	Pld	W	L	OTL	SOL	GF	GA	Pts
1	x, y – Medicine Hat Tigers	72	51	20	1	0	350	248	103
2	x – Lethbridge Hurricanes	72	44	21	4	3	280	253	95
3	x – Red Deer Rebels	72	30	29	9	4	239	258	73

x – clinched playoff berth; y – clinched division title

Eastern Conference Wild Card: Top 2 qualify for playoffs
Pos	Div	Team	Pld	W	L	OTL	SOL	GF	GA	Pts
1	East	x – Brandon Wheat Kings	72	31	31	7	3	225	247	72
2	Central	x – Calgary Hitmen	72	30	32	8	2	215	282	70
3	East	Saskatoon Blades	72	28	35	7	2	190	248	65
4	Central	Edmonton Oil Kings	72	23	43	5	1	193	292	52
5	East	Prince Albert Raiders	72	21	44	5	2	198	283	49
6	Central	Kootenay Ice	72	14	46	10	2	177	335	40

x – clinched playoff berth

B.C. Division: Top 3
Pos	Team	Pld	W	L	OTL	SOL	GF	GA	Pts
1	x, y – Prince George Cougars	72	45	21	3	3	253	201	96
2	x – Kelowna Rockets	72	45	22	5	0	283	206	95
3	x – Kamloops Blazers	72	42	24	2	4	243	198	90

x – clinched playoff berth; y – clinched division title

U.S. Division: Top 3
Pos	Team	Pld	W	L	OTL	SOL	GF	GA	Pts
1	x, y – Everett Silvertips	72	44	16	9	3	229	169	100
2	x – Seattle Thunderbirds	72	46	20	4	2	253	206	98
3	x – Tri-City Americans	72	41	28	3	0	272	252	85

x – clinched playoff berth; y – clinched division title

Western Conference Wild Card: Top 2 qualify for playoffs
Pos	Div	Team	Pld	W	L	OTL	SOL	GF	GA	Pts
1	U.S.	x – Portland Winterhawks	72	40	28	1	3	278	256	84
2	B.C.	x – Victoria Royals	72	37	29	5	1	239	219	80
3	U.S.	Spokane Chiefs	72	27	33	8	4	235	272	66
4	B.C.	Vancouver Giants	72	20	46	3	3	183	296	46

x – clinched playoff berth

== Statistical leaders ==
=== Scoring leaders ===
Players are listed by points, then goals.

Note: GP = Games played; G = Goals; A = Assists; Pts. = Points; PIM = Penalty minutes

Player	Team	GP	G	A	Pts	PIM
Sam Steel	Regina Pats	66	50	81	131	40
Adam Brooks	Regina Pats	66	43	87	130	61
Tyler Wong	Lethbridge Hurricanes	69	51	58	109	53
Chad Butcher	Medicine Hat Tigers	68	27	76	103	75
Jayden Halbgewachs	Moose Jaw Warriors	71	50	51	101	27
Kailer Yamamoto	Spokane Chiefs	65	42	57	99	46
Cody Glass	Portland Winterhawks	69	32	62	94	36
Mason Shaw	Medicine Hat Tigers	71	27	67	94	57
Tyler Steenbergen	Swift Current Broncos	72	51	39	90	22
Matthew Phillips	Victoria Royals	70	50	40	90	50

=== Leading goaltenders ===
These are the goaltenders that lead the league in GAA that have played at least 1800 minutes.

Note: GP = Games played; Mins = Minutes played; W = Wins; L = Losses; OTL = Overtime losses; SOL = Shootout losses; SO = Shutouts; GAA = Goals against average; Sv% = Save percentage

Player	Team	GP	Mins	W	L	OTL	SOL	SO	GAA	Sv%
Carter Hart	Everett Silvertips	54	3078	32	11	6	2	9	1.99	.927
Connor Ingram	Kamloops Blazers	45	2577	26	14	2	2	5	2.44	.927
Ty Edmonds	Prince George Cougars	53	3092	31	16	2	3	1	2.48	.916
Tyler Brown	Regina Pats	50	2885	33	8	5	1	5	2.64	.911
Rylan Toth	Seattle Thunderbirds	58	3274	36	18	2	1	1	2.75	.902

== 2017 WHL playoffs ==
Conference Quarter-finals	Conference Semi-finals
E1	Regina	4
W2	Calgary	0
E1	Regina	4
E3	Swift Current	3
E2	Moose Jaw	3
E3	Swift Current	4
Eastern
C1	Medicine Hat	4
W1	Brandon	0
C1	Medicine Hat	3
C2	Lethbridge	4
C2	Lethbridge	4
C3	Red Deer	3
U1	Everett	4
W2	Victoria	2
U1	Everett	0
U2	Seattle	4
U2	Seattle	4
U3	Tri-City	0
Western
B2	Kelowna	4
B3	Kamloops	2
B2	Kelowna	4
W1	Portland	1
B1	Prince George	2
W1	Portland	4

Conference Finals
E1	Regina	4
C2	Lethbridge	2
U2	Seattle	4
B2	Kelowna	2

WHL Championship
E1	Regina	2
U2	Seattle	4

== Conference Quarter-finals ==
=== Eastern Conference ===
==== (E1) Regina Pats vs. (W2) Calgary Hitmen ====
March 24	Regina Pats	5 – 2	Calgary Hitmen	Brandt Centre	Recap
No scoring		First period	No scoring
16:28 - pp - Josh Mahura (1)		Second period	Jake Kryski (1) - pp - 10:50
4:25 - Adam Brooks (1); 6:03 - Adam Brooks (2); 14:14 - Bryan Lockner (1); 16:59 - sh - Austin Wagner (1)		Third period	Jake Kryski (2) - 9:04
Tyler Brown (20 saves / 22 shots)		Goalie stats	Cody Porter (27 saves / 32 shots)

March 25	Regina Pats	5 – 1	Calgary Hitmen	Brandt Centre	Recap
11:44 - Dawson Leedahl (1)		First period	No scoring
4:17 - pp - Adam Brooks (3); 9:38 - Dawson Leedahl (2)		Second period	Andrew Fyten - (1) 2:16
7:26 - Nick Henry (1); 17:00 - en - Sam Steel (1)		Third period	No scoring
Tyler Brown (26 saves / 27 shots)		Goalie stats	Cody Porter (34 saves / 38 shots)

March 28	Calgary Hitmen	2 – 5	Regina Pats	Scotiabank Saddledome	Recap
No scoring		First period	Sam Steel (2) - 1:02; Sam Steel (3) - 9:31; Wyatt Sloboshan (1) - pp - 19:57
No scoring		Second period	Dawson Leedahl (3) - pp - 16:59
9:41 - pp - Matteo Gennaro (1); 16:42 - Luke Coleman (1)		Third period	Sam Steel (4) - sh - 4:16
Kyle Dumba (30 saves / 35 shots)		Goalie stats	Tyler Brown (41 saves / 43 shots)

March 30	Calgary Hitmen	1 – 5	Regina Pats	Scotiabank Saddledome	Recap
No scoring		First period	No scoring
No scoring		Second period	Dawson Davidson (1) - 2:51; Austin Wagner (2) - pp - 7:47; Austin Wagner (3) - pp - 19:25
7:03 - pp - Tristen Nielsen (1)		Third period	Connor Hobbs (1) - pp - 17:53; Jeff de Wit (1) - pp - 19:11
Cody Porter (34 saves / 38 shots)		Goalie stats	Tyler Brown (20 saves / 21 shots)

Regina wins series 4 – 0

==== (E2) Moose Jaw Warriors vs. (E3) Swift Current Broncos ====
March 24	Moose Jaw Warriors	0 – 2	Swift Current Broncos	Mosaic Place	Recap
No scoring		First period	No scoring
No scoring		Second period	11:18 - Tyler Steenbergen (1)
No scoring		Third period	19:48 - en - Glenn Gawdin (1)
Zach Sawchenko (31 saves / 32 shots)		Goalie stats	Jordan Papirny (40 saves / 40 shots)

March 25	Moose Jaw Warriors	3 – 2	Swift Current Broncos	Mosaic Place	Recap
No scoring		First period	MacKenzie Wight (1) - 8:36
13:52 - Branden Klatt (1)		Second period	Tyler Steenbergen (2) - 16:53
5:07 - Thomas Foster (1); 15:49 - Brayden Burke (1)		Third period	No scoring
Zach Sawchenko (34 saves / 36 shots)		Goalie stats	Jordan Papirny (31 saves / 34 shots)

March 28	Swift Current Broncos	3 – 4	Moose Jaw Warriors	Credit Union iPlex	Recap
6:49 - Colby Sissons (1)		First period	No scoring
No scoring		Second period	Brayden Burke (2) - 2:16; Thomas Foster (2) - 11:18
8:15 - Glenn Gawdin (2); 19:31 - pp - Ryley Lindgren (1)		Third period	Jayden Halbgewachs (1) - 15:34; Thomas Foster - en - 18:34 (3)
Jordan Papirny (38 saves / 41 shots)		Goalie stats	Zach Sawchenko (32 saves / 35 shots)

March 29	Swift Current Broncos	5 – 2	Moose Jaw Warriors	Credit Union iPlex	Recap
0:59 - Ryley Lindgren (2); 2:03 - Ryley Lindgren (3); 8:57 - Tyler Steenbergen (3)		First period	No scoring
No scoring		Second period	Brett Howden (1) - pp - 1:16; Josh Brook - pp - 2:25 (1)
18:57 - pp - en - Tyler Steenbergen (4); 19:45 - pp - Ryley Lindgren (4)		Third period	No scoring
Jordan Papirny (30 saves / 32 shots)		Goalie stats	Zach Sawchenko (20 saves / 24 shots)

March 31	Moose Jaw Warriors	1 – 2	Swift Current Broncos	Mosaic Place	Recap
No scoring		First period	No scoring
17:22 - pp - Brett Howden (2)		Second period	Lane Pederson (1) - 3:25; Lane Pederson (2) - 14:03
No scoring		Third period	No scoring
Zach Sawchenko (20 saves / 22 shots)		Goalie stats	Jordan Papirny (34 saves / 35 shots)

April 1	Swift Current Broncos	2 – 3	Moose Jaw Warriors	Credit Union iPlex	Recap
7:21 - Ryley Lindgren (5)		First period	Noah Gregor (1) - 5:24; Noah Gregor (2) - 14:27
No scoring		Second period	Justin Almeida (1) - 13:52
13:54 - Tyler Steenbergen (5)		Third period	No scoring
Jordan Papirny (38 saves / 41 shots)		Goalie stats	Zach Sawchenko (41 saves / 43 shots)

April 3	Moose Jaw Warriors	2 – 3	Swift Current Broncos	Mosaic Place	Recap
No scoring		First period	Colby Sissons (2) - 4:30
7:49 - Justin Almeida (2)		Second period	Tyler Steenbergen (6) - pp - 1:47
14:59 - Josh Brook (2)		Third period	Glenn Gawdin - 3:17 (3)
Zach Sawchenko (27 saves / 30 shots)		Goalie stats	Jordan Papirny (39 saves / 41 shots)

Swift Current wins series 4 – 3

==== (C1) Medicine Hat Tigers vs. (W1) Brandon Wheat Kings ====
March 24	Medicine Hat Tigers	7 – 2	Brandon Wheat Kings	Canalta Centre	Recap
6:46 - Clayton Kirichenko (1); 18:57 - pp - Matt Bradley (1)		First period	No scoring
2:18 - pp - Mark Rassell (1); 8:55 - pp - Zach Fischer (1); 14:48 - Clayton Kirichenko (2)		Second period	Stelio Mattheos (1) - 3:04; Tyler Coulter (1) - pp - 13:43
12:32 - pp - Mark Rassell (2); 19:39 - Mark Rassell (3)		Third period	No scoring
Michael Bullion (26 saves / 28 shots)		Goalie stats	Logan Thompson (45 saves / 52 shots)

March 25	Medicine Hat Tigers	5 – 3	Brandon Wheat Kings	Canalta Centre	Recap
19:49 - Zach Fischer (2)		First period	No scoring
12:22 - pp - Max Gerlach (1)		Second period	No scoring
4:27 - Zach Fischer (3); 7:54 - John Dahlström (1); 19:44 - en - John Dahlström (2)		Third period	Connor Gutenberg (1) - 7:45; Reid Duke (1) - 11:08; Tyler Coulter (2) - 18:09
Michael Bullion (20 saves / 23 shots)		Goalie stats	Logan Thompson (38 saves / 42 shots); Travis Child (1 save / 1 shot)

March 28*	Brandon Wheat Kings	2 – 6	Medicine Hat Tigers	Credit Union Place	Recap
No scoring		First period	Steven Owre (1) - 7:13
3:41 - Ben McCartney (1); 6:50 - pp - Reid Duke (2)		Second period	John Dahlström (3) - 5:42
No scoring		Third period	Mark Rassell (4) - 4:12; Chad Butcher (1) - 5:49; Ryan Jevne (1) - 7:03; David Quenneville (1) - en - 18:50
Logan Thompson (41 saves / 46 shots)		Goalie stats	Michael Bullion (27 saves / 29 shots)

March 29*	Brandon Wheat Kings	2 – 3	Medicine Hat Tigers	Credit Union Place	Recap
No scoring		First period	No scoring
No scoring		Second period	No scoring
3:11 - pp - Reid Duke (3); 15:48 - pp - Kale Clague (1)		Third period	Clayton Kirichenko (3) - 0:24; David Quenneville (2) - 1:31; David Quenneville (3) - pp - 12:09
Logan Thompson (51 saves / 54 shots)		Goalie stats	Michael Bullion (23 saves / 25 shots)

Medicine Hat wins series 4 – 0

* Note: Games 3 and 4 were played at Credit Union Place in Dauphin due to the Royal Manitoba Winter Fair taking place at the Keystone Centre from March 27 to April 1.

==== (C2) Lethbridge Hurricanes vs. (C3) Red Deer Rebels ====
March 25	Lethbridge Hurricanes	2 – 4	Red Deer Rebels	ENMAX Centre	Recap
13:52 - Tyler Wong (1)		First period	No scoring
3:14 - Ryan Vandervlis (1)		Second period	Michael Špaček (1) - 18:42
No scoring		Third period	Cameron Hausinger (1) - 1:55; Brandon Hagel (1) - pp - 18:03; Lane Zablocki (1) - pp - en - 19:56
Stuart Skinner (29 saves / 32 shots)		Goalie stats	Riley Lamb (25 saves / 27 shots)

March 26	Lethbridge Hurricanes	5 – 2	Red Deer Rebels	ENMAX Centre	Recap
6:56 - Ryan Bowen (1)		First period	No scoring
1:17 - Egor Babenko (1); 11:57 - sh - Tanner Nagel (1); 17:17 - Egor Babenko (2)		Second period	No scoring
2:18 - Egor Babenko (3)		Third period	Michael Špaček (2) - pp - 5:59; Evan Polei (1) - pp - 11:46
Stuart Skinner (24 saves / 26 shots)		Goalie stats	Riley Lamb (20 saves / 25 shots); Lasse Petersen (4 saves / 4 shots)

March 29	Red Deer Rebels	4 – 3	2OT	Lethbridge Hurricanes	ENMAX Centrium	Recap
2:44 - pp - Lane Zablocki (2)		First period		Tyler Wong (2) - pp - 8:51
No scoring		Second period		Brennan Menell (1) - 18:57
16:53 - pp - Brandon Hagel (2); 19:40 - Lane Zablocki (3)		Third period		Zak Zborosky (1) - 3:10
0:48 - Evan Polei (2)		Second overtime period		No scoring
Riley Lamb (49 saves / 52 shots)		Goalie stats		Stuart Skinner (45 saves / 49 shots)

March 30	Red Deer Rebels	5 – 3	Lethbridge Hurricanes	ENMAX Centrium	Recap
19:22 - Lane Zablocki (4)		First period	Tyler Wong (3) - 2:19; Jordy Bellerive (1) - pp - 15:39
5:14 - sh - Brandon Hagel (3)		Second period	Tyler Wong (4) - pp - 17:58
9:11 - pp - Lane Zablocki (5); 18:01 - Evan Polei (3); 19:05 - en - Brandon Hagel (4)		Third period	No scoring
Riley Lamb (27 saves / 30 shots)		Goalie stats	Stuart Skinner (38 saves / 42 shots)

April 1	Lethbridge Hurricanes	5 – 3	Red Deer Rebels	ENMAX Centre	Recap
13:58 - Alec Baer (1)		First period	No scoring
7:07 - Zane Franklin (1); 10:36 - Matt Alfaro (1)		Second period	Michael Špaček (3) - pp - 4:20; Brandon Hagel (5) - pp - 10:25; Brandon Hagel (6) - 13:49
2:28 - Zak Zborosky (2); 19:34 - en - Giorgio Estephan (1)		Third period	No scoring
Stuart Skinner (39 saves / 42 shots)		Goalie stats	Riley Lamb (36 saves / 40 shots)

April 2	Red Deer Rebels	1 – 4	Lethbridge Hurricanes	ENMAX Centrium	Recap
19:04 - Michael Špaček (4)		First period	No scoring
No scoring		Second period	Ryan Vandervils (2) - 13:51; Alec Baer (2) - 17:13
No scoring		Third period	Tyler Wong - pp - 0:23 (5); Jadon Joseph (1) - en - 18:21
Riley Lamb (31 saves / 34 shots)		Goalie stats	Stuart Skinner (33 saves / 34 shots)

April 4	Lethbridge Hurricanes	6 – 2	Red Deer Rebels	ENMAX Centre	Recap
7:21 - pp - Brennan Menell (2); 8:24 - pp - Giorgio Estephan (2); 19:30 - Ryan Vandervlis (3)		First period	Lane Zablocki (6) - 19:08
9:29 - sh - Jordy Bellerive (2)		Second period	No scoring
8:18 - pp - Ryan Vandervlis (4); 10:33 - pp - Brennan Menell (3)		Third period	Brandon Hagel (7) - 2:31
Stuart Skinner (31 saves / 33 shots)		Goalie stats	Riley Lamb (15 saves / 19 shots); Lasse Petersen (10 saves / 12 shots)

Lethbridge wins series 4 – 3

=== Western Conference ===
==== (U1) Everett Silvertips vs. (W2) Victoria Royals ====
March 24	Everett Silvertips	4 – 2	Victoria Royals	Xfinity Arena	Recap
8:11 - pp - Kevin Davis (1)		First period	No scoring
12:04 - Patrick Bajkov (1); 14:27 - Dominic Zwerger (1); 16:24 - pp - Dominic Zwerger (2)		Second period	Jack Walker - 19:03
No scoring		Third period	Jack Walker (2) - pp - 14:58
Carter Hart (30 saves / 32 shots)		Goalie stats	Griffen Outhouse (21 saves / 25 shots)

March 25	Everett Silvertips	3 – 4	Victoria Royals	Xfinity Arena	Recap
7:53 - pp - Matt Fonteyne (1)		First period	Matthew Phillips (1) - pp - 12:45
0:49 - pp - Patrick Bajkov (2)		Second period	Tyler Soy (1) - 1:40; Tyler Soy (2) - pp - 7:30
Brandson Hein (1) - 7:49		Third period	Vladimir Bobylev (1) - 15:01
Carter Hart (26 saves / 30 shots)		Goalie stats	Griffen Outhouse (18 saves / 21 shots)

March 28	Victoria Royals	0 – 2	Everett Silvertips	Save-On-Foods Memorial Centre	Recap
No scoring		First period	No scoring
No scoring		Second period	Patrick Bajkov (3) - pp - 0:22; Eetu Tuulola (1) - pp - 17:37
No scoring		Third period	No scoring
Griffen Outhouse (19 saves / 21 shots)		Goalie stats	Carter Hart (25 saves / 25 shots)

March 29	Victoria Royals	2 – 1	Everett Silvertips	Save-On-Foods Memorial Centre	Recap
5:03 - Regan Nagy (1)		First period	No scoring
19:16 - Dante Hannoun (1)		Second period	No scoring
No scoring		Third period	Patrick Bajkov (4) - pp - 16:05
Griffen Outhouse (30 saves / 31 shots)		Goalie stats	Carter Hart (18 saves / 20 shots)

March 31	Everett Silvertips	3 – 2	OT	Victoria Royals	Xfinity Arena	Recap
No scoring		First period		No scoring
5:14 - Matt Fonteyne (2); 19:59 - pp - Patrick Bajkov (5)		Second period		Carter Folk (1) - 6:02
No scoring		Third period		Jared Dmytriw (1) - 14:20
7:02 - Eetu Tuulola (2)		First overtime period		No scoring
Carter Hart (17 saves / 19 shots)		Goalie stats		Griffen Outhouse (33 saves / 36 shots)

April 2	Victoria Royals	2 – 3	5OT	Everett Silvertips	Save-On-Foods Memorial Centre	Recap
No scoring		First period		No scoring
7:42 - Regan Nagy (2); 16:44 - pp - Jared Dmytriw (2)		Second period		Cal Babych (1) - 6:31
No scoring		Third period		Brian King (1) - 1:36
No scoring		Fifth overtime period		Cal Babych (2) - 11:36
Griffen Outhouse (72 saves / 75 shots)		Goalie stats		Carter Hart (64 saves / 66 shots)

Everett wins series 4 – 2

==== (U2) Seattle Thunderbirds vs. (U3) Tri-City Americans ====
March 24	Seattle Thunderbirds	4 – 2	Tri-City Americans	ShoWare Center	Recap
5:37 - Keegan Kolesar (1); 8:50 - pp - Ryan Gropp (1)		First period	Jordan Topping (1) - 10:10
No scoring		Second period	No scoring
4:50 - Austin Strand (1); 17:46 - Keegan Kolesar (2)		Third period	Austyn Playfair (1) - sh - 7:26
Carl Stankowski (33 saves / 35 shots)		Goalie stats	Rylan Parenteau (27 saves / 31 shots)

March 25	Seattle Thunderbirds	5 – 2	Tri-City Americans	ShoWare Center	Recap
8:55 - pp - Nolan Volcan (1); 17:14 - Scott Eansor (1)		First period	No scoring
No scoring		Second period	Parker AuCoin (1) - 16:21
15:03 - Matthew Wedman (1); 15:29 - pp - Donovan Neuls (1); 19:42 - pp - Aaron Hyman (1)		Third period	Maxwell James (1) - pp - 6:52
Carl Stankowski (28 saves / 30 shots)		Goalie stats	Rylan Parenteau (36 saves / 41 shots)

March 29	Tri-City Americans	2 – 9	Seattle Thunderbirds	Toyota Center	Recap
No scoring		First period	Ethan Bear (1) - 2:55; Scott Eansor (2) - 7:48; Jarret Tyszka (1) - 10:16; Donovan Neuls (2) - 12:03; Austin Strand (2) - pp - 17:08
16:56 - Austyn Playfair (2); 19:41 - Morgan Geekie (1)		Second period	Keegan Kolesar (3) - 15:03; Alexander True (1) - 17:13; Ethan Bear (2) - pp - 18:40
No scoring		Third period	Austin Strand (3) - pp - 16:10
Evan Sarthou (4 saves / 7 shots); Rylan Parenteau (23 saves / 29 shots)		Goalie stats	Carl Stankowski (21 saves / 23 shots)

March 31	Tri-City Americans	2 – 5	Seattle Thunderbirds	Toyota Center	Recap
6:19 - Kyle Olson (1)		First period	Alexander True (2) - pp - 3:01; Nolan Volcan (2) - 19:59
3:58 - Nolan Yaremko (1)		Second period	Donovan Neuls (3) - 16:59; Sami Moilanen (1) - 19:20
No scoring		Third period	Alexander True (3) - en - 18:33
Rylan Parenteau (27 saves / 31 shots)		Goalie stats	Carl Stankowski (28 saves / 30 shots)

Seattle wins series 4 – 0

==== (B1) Prince George Cougars vs. (W1) Portland Winterhawks ====
March 24	Prince George Cougars	2 – 4	Portland Winterhawks	CN Centre	Recap
17:49 - pp - Jared Bethune (1)		First period	Brendan De Jong (1) - pp - 4:34; Skyler McKenzie (1) - 18:39
No scoring		Second period	Keegan Iverson (1) - pp - 3:06
2:43 - Jansen Harkins (1)		Third period	Colton Veloso (1) - en - 19:22
Ty Edmonds (31 saves / 34 shots)		Goalie stats	Cole Kehler (23 saves / 25 shots)

March 26	Prince George Cougars	5 – 1	Portland Winterhawks	CN Centre	Recap
15:57 - Brad Morrison (1)		First period	No scoring
8:32 - Aaron Boyd (1); 18:35 - Aaron Boyd (2)		Second period	No scoring
0:22 - Shane Collins (1); 0:57 - pp - Radovan Bondra (1)		Third period	Cody Glass (1) - pp - 12:53
Ty Edmonds (40 saves / 41 shots)		Goalie stats	Cole Kehler (19 saves / 24 shots); Shane Farkas (12 saves / 12 shots)

March 29	Portland Winterhawks	1 – 6	Prince George Cougars	Veterans Memorial Coliseum	Recap
0:14 - Skyler McKenzie (2)		First period	Jansen Harkins (2) - 8:26; Kody McDonald (1) - pp - 12:36; Colby McAuley (1) - 17:42
No scoring		Second period	Tate Olson (1) - pp - 12:03
No scoring		Third period	Brogan O'Brien (1) - 6:26; Colby McAuley (2) - 7:35
Cole Kehler (32 saves / 38 shots); Shane Farkas (7 saves / 7 shots)		Goalie stats	Ty Edmonds (40 saves / 41 shots)

March 30	Portland Winterhawks	5 – 4	Prince George Cougars	Veterans Memorial Coliseum	Recap
17:01 - Evan Weinger (1); 18:33 - pp - Skyler McKenzie (3)		First period	Aaron Boyd (3) - 8:12; Jesse Gabrielle (1) - 11:17
8:20 - pp - Keegan Iverson (2)		Second period	Nikita Popugaev (1) - pp - 15:46; Radovan Bondra (2) - 17:24
8:54 - Matt Revel (1); 15:34 - Matt Revel (2)		Third period	No scoring
Cole Kehler (29 saves / 33 shots)		Goalie stats	Ty Edmonds (27 saves / 32 shots)

April 1	Prince George Cougars	3 – 5	Portland Winterhawks	CN Centre	Recap
1:09 - Jared Bethune (2)		First period	Brad Ginnell (1) - 4:28; Joachim Blichfeld (1) - pp - 15:14
No scoring		Second period	No scoring
10:04 - Brogan O'Brien (2); 13:23 - Colby McAuley (3)		Third period	Joachim Blichfeld (2) - 2:45; Ryan Hughes (1) - 14:22; Cody Glass (2) - 17:25
Ty Edmonds (23 saves / 28 shots)		Goalie stats	Cole Kehler (48 saves / 51 shots)

April 3	Portland Winterhawks	4 – 2	Prince George Cougars	Veterans Memorial Coliseum	Recap
No scoring		First period	No scoring
5:35 - Colton Veloso (2); 7:18 - Ryan Hughes (2); 11:58 - pp - Alex Overhardt (1)		Second period	No scoring
7:43 - Keegan Iverson(3)		Third period	Kody McDonald (2) - 6:38; Colby McAuley (4) - pp - 18:59
Cole Kehler (35 saves / 37 shots)		Goalie stats	Ty Edmonds (38 saves / 42 shots)

Portland wins series 4 – 2

==== (B2) Kelowna Rockets vs. (B3) Kamloops Blazers ====
March 24	Kelowna Rockets	4 – 0	Kamloops Blazers	Prospera Place	Recap
17:20 - Carsen Twarynski (1); 17:48 - Tomáš Šoustal (1)		First period	No scoring
12:40 - pp - Reid Gardiner (1)		Second period	No scoring
8:47 - pp - Carsen Twarynski (2)		Third period	No scoring
Michael Herringer (15 saves / 15 shots)		Goalie stats	Connor Ingram (44 saves / 48 shots)

March 25	Kelowna Rockets	3 – 2	Kamloops Blazers	Prospera Place	Recap
2:53 - Cal Foote (1)		First period	No scoring
No scoring		Second period	No scoring
11:55 - sh - Dillon Dubé (1); 13:24 - pp - Dillon Dubé (2)		Third period	Quinn Benjafield (1) - 13:59; Ondřej Vála (1) - pp - 16:30
Michael Herringer (33 saves / 35 shots)		Goalie stats	Connor Ingram (34 saves / 37 shots)

March 28	Kamloops Blazers	4 – 1	Kelowna Rockets	Sandman Centre	Recap
8:06 - Lane Bauer (1)		First period	Kole Lind (1) - 16:28
12:10 - Jermaine Loewen (1); 12:38 - ps - Rūdolfs Balcers (1); 18:07 - Lane Bauer (2)		Second period	No scoring
No scoring		Third period	No scoring
Connor Ingram (37 saves / 38 shots)		Goalie stats	Michael Herringer (34 saves / 38 shots)

March 29	Kamloops Blazers	0 – 1	Kelowna Rockets	Sandman Centre	Recap
No scoring		First period	No scoring
No scoring		Second period	Dillon Dubé (3) - 2:37
No scoring		Third period	No scoring
Connor Ingram (48 saves / 49 shots)		Goalie stats	Michael Herringer (24 saves / 24 shots)

March 31	Kelowna Rockets	1 – 4	Kamloops Blazers	Prospera Place	Recap
11:05 - Reid Gardiner (2)		First period	Garrett Pilon (1) - 17:46
No scoring		Second period	Quinn Benjafield (2) - 1:22
No scoring		Third period	Rūdolfs Balcers (2) - 5:32; Collin Shirley (1) - sh - 12:22
Michael Herringer (28 saves / 32 shots)		Goalie stats	Connor Ingram (32 saves / 33 shots)

April 2	Kamloops Blazers	2 – 4	Kelowna Rockets	Sandman Centre	Recap
No scoring		First period	Dillon Dubé (4) - 11:57
No scoring		Second period	Reid Gardiner (3) - pp - 5:36
16:49 - Collin Shirley (2); 17:46 - Brodi Stuart (1)		Third period	Reid Gardiner (4) - 18:03; Reid Gardiner (5) - en - 19:37
Connor Ingram (31 saves / 34 shots)		Goalie stats	Michael Herringer (21 saves / 23 shots)

Kelowna wins series 4 – 2

== Conference Semi-finals ==
=== Eastern Conference ===
==== (E1) Regina Pats vs. (E3) Swift Current Broncos ====
April 6	Regina Pats	1 – 2	OT	Swift Current Broncos	Brandt Centre	Recap
17:36 - Austin Wagner (4)		First period		No scoring
No scoring		Second period		No scoring
No scoring		Third period		Lane Pederson (3) - 19:21
No scoring		First overtime period		Ryley Lindgren (6) - 15:12
Tyler Brown (34 saves / 36 shots)		Goalie stats		Jordan Papirny (53 saves / 54 shots)

April 7	Regina Pats	6 – 2	Swift Current Broncos	Brandt Centre	Recap
9:36 - Jonathan Smart (1)		First period	Maxime Lajoie (1) - pp - 12:35; Tyler Steenbergen (7) - pp - 16:18
0:43 - pp - Connor Hobbs (2); 6:08 - pp - Nick Henry (2); 14:28 - Austin Wagner (5)		Second period	No scoring
1:30 - Robbie Holmes (1); 14:45 - en - Austin Wagner (6)		Third period	No scoring
Tyler Brown (15 saves / 17 shots)		Goalie stats	Jordan Papirny (34 saves / 39 shots)

April 10	Swift Current Broncos	2 – 1	OT	Regina Pats	Credit Union iPlex	Recap
No scoring		First period		No scoring
5:10 - pp - Conner Chaulk (1)		Second period		Dawson Leedahl (4) - 3:03
No scoring		Third period		No scoring
1:46 - Colby Sissons (3)		First overtime period		No scoring
Jordan Papirny (33 saves / 34 shots)		Goalie stats		Tyler Brown (31 saves / 33 shots)

April 11	Swift Current Broncos	5 – 4	3OT	Regina Pats	Credit Union iPlex	Recap
No scoring		First period		Dawson Leedahl (5) - pp - 9:10; Dawson Leedahl (6) - 15:00
15:30 - Ryley Lindgren (7); 19:42 - Artyom Minulin (1)		Second period		No scoring
6:19 - Tyler Steenbergen (8); 17:35 - Ryley Lindgren (8)		Third period		Dawson Leedahl (7) - 4:12; Dawson Leedahl (8) - 19:30
9:54 - pp - Glenn Gawdin (4)		Third overtime period		No scoring
Jordan Papirny (65 saves / 69 shots)		Goalie stats		Tyler Brown (64 saves / 69 shots)

April 14	Regina Pats	3 – 2	Swift Current Broncos	Brandt Centre	Recap
19:46 - pp - Sam Steel (5)		First period	Colby Sissons (4) - pp - 17:16
3:49 - Connor Hobbs (3); 4:27 - Nick Henry (3)		Second period	No scoring
No scoring		Third period	Glenn Gawdin (5) - pp - 13:18
Tyler Brown (30 saves / 32 shots)		Goalie stats	Jordan Papirny (33 saves / 36 shots)

April 15	Swift Current Broncos	3 – 5	Regina Pats	Credit Union iPlex	Recap
11:41 - Artyom Minulin (2)		First period	Austin Wagner (7) - 7:24
0:29 - Arthur Miller (1); 2:27 - Glenn Gawdin (6)		Second period	Josh Mahura (2) - 18:36; Wyatt Sloboshan (2) - 19:35
No scoring		Third period	Austin Wagner (8) - 1:15; Filip Ahl (1) - 5:48
Jordan Papirny (23 saves / 28 shots)		Goalie stats	Tyler Brown (34 saves / 37 shots)

April 17	Regina Pats	5 – 1	Swift Current Broncos	Brandt Centre	Recap
2:19 - Sam Steel (6); 4:57 - Filip Ahl (2)		First period	No scoring
9:19 - Sam Steel (7); 15:36 - Austin Wagner (9)		Second period	No scoring
15:36 - sh - en - Austin Wagner (10)		Third period	Conner Chaulk (2) - pp - 14:33
Tyler Brown (23 saves / 24 shots)		Goalie stats	Jordan Papirny (38 saves / 42 shots)

Regina wins series 4 – 3

==== (C1) Medicine Hat Tigers vs. (C2) Lethbridge Hurricanes ====
April 7	Medicine Hat Tigers	4 – 0	Lethbridge Hurricanes	Canalta Centre	Recap
15:23 - John Dahlström (4)		First period	No scoring
5:42 - Chad Butcher (2); 17:25 - Steven Owre (2)		Second period	No scoring
15:01 - Zach Fischer (4)		Third period	No scoring
Michael Bullion (16 saves / 16 shots)		Goalie stats	Stuart Skinner (33 saves / 37 shots)

April 8	Medicine Hat Tigers	4 – 7	Lethbridge Hurricanes	Canalta Centre	Recap
0:20 - Zach Fischer (5); 2:23 - Zach Fischer (6); 11:10 - pp - Ryan Jevne (2)		First period	Giorgio Estephan (3) - 8:16; Alec Baer (3) - 8:43; Tyler Wong (6) - 17:33
8:37 - Dylan Cozens (1)		Second period	James Hamblin (1) - 6:03
No scoring		Third period	Giorgio Estephan (4) - pp - 12:51; Giorgio Estephan (5) - en - 18:35; Tanner Nagel (2) - sh - en - 19:12
Michael Bullion (19 saves / 24 shots)		Goalie stats	Stuart Skinner (26 saves / 30 shots)

April 11	Lethbridge Hurricanes	5 – 2	Medicine Hat Tigers	ENMAX Centre	Recap
No scoring		First period	James Hamblin (2) - 12:27
12:13 - Jordy Bellerive (3); 13:17 - pp - Giorgio Estephan (6)		Second period	Mark Rassell (5) - 8:39
4:04 - pp - Tyler Wong (7); 11:28 - Giorgio Estephan (7); 18:58 - en - Brennan Menell (4)		Third period	No scoring
Stuart Skinner (36 saves / 38 shots)		Goalie stats	Michael Bullion (26 saves / 30 shots)

April 12	Lethbridge Hurricanes	2 – 3	OT	Medicine Hat Tigers	ENMAX Centre	Recap
10:25 - Giorgio Estephan (8); 17:22 - Egor Babenko (4)		First period		No scoring
No scoring		Second period		Chad Butcher (3) - 18:06
No scoring		Third period		Max Gerlach (2) - pp - 13:28
No scoring		First overtime period		John Dahlström (5) - 11:32
Stuart Skinner (56 saves / 59 shots)		Goalie stats		Michael Bullion (28 saves / 30 shots)

April 14	Medicine Hat Tigers	4 – 5	Lethbridge Hurricanes	Canalta Centre	Recap
6:17 - Max Gerlach (3); 12:44 - Clayton Kirichenko (4)		First period	Tyler Wong (8) - 3:36; Ryan Bowen (2) - 8:33; Tyler Wong (9) 8 - pp - 17:48
14:00 - Max Gerlach (4)		Second period	No scoring
14:34 - pp - David Quenneville (4)		Third period	Ryan Vandervlis (5) - pp - 4:14; Brennan Riddle (1) - pp - 10:27
Michael Bullion (22 saves / 27 shots)		Goalie stats	Stuart Skinner (37 saves / 41 shots)

April 16	Lethbridge Hurricanes	2 – 5	Medicine Hat Tigers	ENMAX Centre	Recap
9:48 - Egor Babenko (5); 15:03 - pp - Egor Babenko (6)		First period	Max Gerlach (5) - pp - 5:13; Matt Bradley (2) - pp - 13:00
No scoring		Second period	No scoring
No scoring		Third period	Steven Owre (3) - pp - 4:20; Matt Bradley (3) - 11:55; John Dahlström (6) - en - 18:11
Stuart Skinner (32 saves / 36 shots)		Goalie stats	Michael Bullion (24 saves / 26 shots)

April 18	Medicine Hat Tigers	4 – 5	OT	Lethbridge Hurricanes	Canalta Centre	Recap
8:47 - Zach Fischer (7)		First period		Jordy Bellerive (4) - 8:56; Tyler Wong (10) - 16:22; Egor Babenko (7) - 19:13
4:07 - Matt Bradley (4); 5:14 - Mark Rassell (6); 9:26 - pp - Mark Rassell (7)		Second period		No scoring
No scoring		Third period		Dylan Cozens (2) - 17:17
No scoring		First overtime period		Tyler Wong (11) - sh - 3:02
Michael Bullion (25 saves / 30 shots)		Goalie stats		Stuart Skinner (36 saves / 40 shots)

Lethbridge wins series 4 – 3

=== Western Conference ===
==== (U1) Everett Silvertips vs. (U2) Seattle Thunderbirds ====
April 7	Everett Silvertips	2 – 3	Seattle Thunderbirds	Xfinity Arena	Recap
No scoring		First period	No scoring
17:53 - Eetu Tuulola (3)		Second period	Mathew Barzal (1) - 2:07
18:22 - Aaron Irving (1)		Third period	Tyler Adams (1) - 5:31; Donovan Neuls (4) - 19:01
Carter Hart (30 saves / 33 shots)		Goalie stats	Carl Stankowski (21 saves / 23 shots)

April 8	Everett Silvertips	3 – 4	Seattle Thunderbirds	Xfinity Arena	Recap
7:56 - Bryce Kindopp (1); 12:52 - Connor Dewar (1)		First period	Scott Eansor (3) - 7:05
No scoring		Second period	Zack Andrusiak (1) - 11:12; Sami Moilanen (2) - 11:30; Ethan Bear (3) - pp - 16:34
12:33 - Eetu Tuulola (4)		Third period	No scoring
Carter Hart (11 saves / 15 shots)		Goalie stats	Carl Stankowski (20 saves / 23 shots)

April 11	Seattle Thunderbirds	5 – 4	OT	Everett Silvertips	ShoWare Center	Recap
12:35 - Keegan Kolesar (4)		First period		No scoring
0:32 - Nolan Volcan (3); 3:33 - Alexander True (4)		Second period		Aaron Irving (2) - 7:22; Eetu Tuulola (5) - pp - 9:41; Dominic Zwerger (3) - pp - 13:29; Eetu Tuulola (6) - 14:37
4:23 - Mathew Barzal (2)		Third period		No scoring
1:30 - Mathew Barzal (3)		First overtime period		No scoring
Carl Stankowski (14 saves / 18 shots)		Goalie stats		Carter Hart (28 saves / 33 shots)

April 14	Seattle Thunderbirds	4 – 1	Everett Silvertips	ShoWare Center	Recap
14:03 - Donovan Neuls (5); 16:47 - Keegan Kolesar (5)		First period	No scoring
6:24 - pp - Mathew Barzal (4); 12:51 - Keegan Kolesar (6)		Second period	Dominic Zwerger (4) - sh - 10:05
No scoring		Third period	No scoring
Carl Stankowski (24 saves / 25 shots)		Goalie stats	Carter Hart (27 saves / 31 shots)

Seattle wins series 4 – 0

==== (B2) Kelowna Rockets vs. (W1) Portland Winterhawks ====
April 7	Kelowna Rockets	4 – 2	Portland Winterhawks	Prospera Place	Recap
No scoring		First period	No scoring
3:42 - Calvin Thürkauf (1); 4:32 - Kole Lind (2); 5:17 - Reid Gardiner (6); 16:08 - pp - Dillon Dubé (5)		Second period	No scoring
No scoring		Third period	Brad Ginnell (2) - 10:58; Cody Glass (3) - pp - 17:34
Michael Herringer (27 saves / 29 shots)		Goalie stats	Cole Kehler (50 saves / 54 shots)

April 8	Kelowna Rockets	5 – 2	Portland Winterhawks	Prospera Place	Recap
No scoring		First period	No scoring
7:33 - Kole Lind (3); 9:56 - pp - Tomáš Šoustal (2)		Second period	Joachim Blichfeld (3) - 18:50
14:07 - James Hilsendager (1); 18:40 - en - Nick Merkley (1); 19:33 - en - Nick Merkley (2)		Third period	Ryan Hughes (3) - 19:20
Michael Herringer (23 saves / 25 shots)		Goalie stats	Cole Kehler (38 saves / 41 shots)

April 11	Portland Winterhawks	4 – 2	Kelowna Rockets	Veterans Memorial Coliseum	Recap
Calvin Thürkauf (2) - pp - 11:23		First period	Evan Weinger (2) - 4:06
5:29 - pp - Joachim Blichfeld (4); 16:41 - Caleb Jones (1); 19:03 - sh - Skyler McKenzie (4)		Second period	No scoring
No scoring		Third period	Calvin Thürkauf (3) - pp - 18:33
Cole Kehler (28 saves / 30 shots)		Goalie stats	Michael Herringer (26 saves / 30 shots)

April 12	Portland Winterhawks	2 – 7	Kelowna Rockets	Veterans Memorial Coliseum	Recap
No scoring		First period	1:48 - Carsen Twarynski (3)
9:41 - pp - Cody Glass (4)		Second period	Reid Gardiner (7) - pp - 2:07; Reid Gardiner (8) - pp - 5:49; Nick Merkley (3) - ps - 14:09; Calvin Thürkauf (4) - 14:37; Calvin Thürkauf (5) - 17:55
16:34 - pp - Caleb Jones (2)		Third period	Rodney Southam (1) - sh - 18:45
Cole Kehler (26 saves / 32 shots); Shane Farkas (7 saves / 8 shots)		Goalie stats	Michael Herringer (35 saves / 37 shots)

April 14	Kelowna Rockets	6 – 2	Portland Winterhawks	Prospera Place	Recap
4:54 - pp - Reid Gardiner (9); 8:51 - pp - Rodney Southam (2); 12:41 - pp - Reid Gardiner (10)		First period	No scoring
No scoring		Second period	Joachim Blichfeld (5) - 7:06; Matt Revel (3) - sh - 9:04
9:27 - Reid Gardiner (11); 16:02 - pp - Reid Gardiner (12); 17:32 - en - Dillon Dubé (6)		Third period	No scoring
Michael Herringer (27 saves / 29 shots)		Goalie stats	Cole Kehler (38 saves / 43 shots)

Kelowna wins series 4 – 1

== Conference Finals ==
=== Eastern Conference ===
==== (E1) Regina Pats vs. (C2) Lethbridge Hurricanes ====
April 21	Regina Pats	1 – 3	Lethbridge Hurricanes	Brandt Centre	Recap
1:10 - Austin Wagner (11)		First period	No scoring
No scoring		Second period	Giorgio Estephan (9) - 13:23
No scoring		Third period	Jordy Bellerive (5) - pp - 1:59; Giorgio Estephan (10) - en - 18:38
Tyler Brown (22 saves / 24 shots)		Goalie stats	Stuart Skinner (36 saves / 37 shots)

April 22	Regina Pats	3 – 2	OT	Lethbridge Hurricanes	Brandt Centre	Recap
9:44 - Jeff de Wit (2)		First period		No scoring
No scoring		Second period		No scoring
7:21 - sh - Austin Wagner (12)		Third period		Zane Franklin (2) - 9:21; Jordy Bellerive (6) - 9:54
17:05 - Adam Brooks (4)		First overtime period		No scoring
Tyler Brown (29 saves / 31 shots)		Goalie stats		Stuart Skinner (48 saves / 51 shots)

April 25	Lethbridge Hurricanes	3 – 1	Regina Pats	ENMAX Centre	Recap
0:16 - Brennan Menell (5)		First period	No scoring
13:54 - Jadon Joseph (2)		Second period	Dawson Leedahl (9) - 10:43
4:08 - Egor Babenko (8)		Third period	No scoring
Stuart Skinner (28 saves / 29 shots)		Goalie stats	Tyler Brown (24 saves / 27 shots)

April 26	Lethbridge Hurricanes	2 – 6	Regina Pats	ENMAX Centre	Recap
No scoring		First period	Braydon Buziak (1) - 9:53
2:21 - Dylan Cozens (3); 9:34 - Ryan Vandervils (6)		Second period	Jeff de Wit (3) - 9:00; Adam Brooks (5) - 18:06; Dawson Leedahl (10) - 19:16
No scoring		Third period	Connor Hobbs (4) - pp - 7:53; Wyatt Sloboshan (3) - en - 17:04
Stuart Skinner (28 saves / 33 shots)		Goalie stats	Tyler Brown (24 saves / 26 shots)

April 28	Regina Pats	5 – 3	Lethbridge Hurricanes	Brandt Centre	Recap
15:37 - Josh Mahura (3)		First period	Josh Tarzwell (1) - 2:53
5:10 - pp - Sam Steel (8); 11:29 - Filip Ahl (3)		Second period	Ryan Vandervlis (7) - pp - 3:04; Egor Babenko (9) - 13:54
6:25 - Dawson Leedahl (11); 19:57 - en - Austin Wagner (13)		Third period	No scoring
Tyler Brown (29 saves / 32 shots)		Goalie stats	Stuart Skinner (26 saves / 30 shots)

April 30	Lethbridge Hurricanes	4 – 7	Regina Pats	ENMAX Centre	Recap
1:43 - Egor Babenko (10); 6:56 - pp - Jordy Bellerive (7); 8:02 - pp - Ryan Vandervlis (8)		First period	Robbie Holmes (2) - 8:25; Josh Mahura (4) - 10:46
1:05 - pp - Giorgio Estephan (11)		Second period	Filip Ahl (4) - pp - 15:47; Nick Henry (4) - 17:20
No scoring		Third period	Jeff de Wit (4) - 8:41; Austin Wagner (14) - 9:41; Wyatt Sloboshan (4) - en - 19:19
Stuart Skinner (38 saves / 44 shots)		Goalie stats	Tyler Brown (24 saves / 28 shots)

Regina wins series 4 – 2

=== Western Conference ===
==== (U2) Seattle Thunderbirds vs. (B2) Kelowna Rockets ====
April 21	Seattle Thunderbirds	5 – 4	Kelowna Rockets	ShoWare Center	Recap
10:00 - Ryan Gropp (2)		First period	Kole Lind (4) - pp - 19:53
19:57 - Alexander True (5)		Second period	Reid Gardiner (13) - 1:09
0:52 - Turner Ottenbreit (1); 3:52 - Sami Moilanen (3); 19:48 - pp - Ethan Bear (4)		Third period	Tomáš Šoustal (3) - pp - 5:53; Calvin Thürkauf (6) - pp - 15:00
Carl Stankowski (29 saves / 33 shots)		Goalie stats	Michael Herringer (20 saves / 25 shots)

April 22	Seattle Thunderbirds	3 – 4	OT	Kelowna Rockets	ShoWare Center	Recap
No scoring		First period		Nick Merkley (4) - 12:52; Reid Gardiner (14) - sh - 19:59
3:12 - pp - Ethan Bear (5)		Second period		Kole Lind (5) - pp - 19:34
1:43 - pp - Keegan Kolesar (7); 9:06 - Donovan Neuls (6)		Third period		No scoring
No scoring		First overtime period		4:56 - Reid Gardiner (15)
Carl Stankowski (28 saves / 32 shots)		Goalie stats		Michael Herringer (30 saves / 33 shots)

April 25	Kelowna Rockets	1 – 2	Seattle Thunderbirds	Prospera Place	Recap
No scoring		First period	No scoring
No scoring		Second period	Keegan Kolesar (8) - 11:33
13:53 - pp - Calvin Thürkauf (7)		Third period	Keegan Kolesar (9) - 19:40
Michael Herringer (12 saves / 14 shots)		Goalie stats	Carl Stankowski (34 saves / 35 shots)

April 26	Kelowna Rockets	4 – 2	Seattle Thunderbirds	Prospera Place	Recap
8:34 - pp - Nolan Foote (1); 9:02 - Kole Lind (6)		First period	Ryan Gropp (3) - pp - 3:09
2:40 - Nick Merkley (5)		Second period	No scoring
4:29 - Tomáš Šoustal (4)		Third period	Scott Eansor - 10:54 (4)
Michael Herringer (27 saves / 29 shots)		Goalie stats	Carl Stankowski (31 saves / 35 shots)

April 28	Seattle Thunderbirds	5 – 3	Kelowna Rockets	ShoWare Center	Recap
3:15 - sh - Scott Eansor (5); 10:57 - Sami Moilanen (4)		First period	Calvin Thürkauf (8) - pp - 12:07
17:34 - pp - Alexander True (6); 18:54 - Ryan Gropp (4)		Second period	Nick Merkley (6) - pp - 9:23
6:57 - pp - Alexander True (7)		Third period	Dillon Dubé (7) - pp - 19:25
Carl Stankowski (37 saves / 40 shots)		Goalie stats	Michael Herringer (19 saves / 24 shots)

April 30	Kelowna Rockets	1 – 3	Seattle Thunderbirds	Prospera Place	Recap
15:57 - pp - Nolan Foote (2)		First period	No scoring
No scoring		Second period	Austin Strand (4) - 4:56; Alexander True (8) - pp - 9:30; Mathew Barzal (5) - 15:14
No scoring		Third period	No scoring
Michael Herringer (19 saves / 22 shots)		Goalie stats	Carl Stankowski (17 saves / 18 shots)

Seattle wins series 4 – 2

== WHL Championship ==
=== (E1) Regina Pats vs. (U2) Seattle Thunderbirds ===
May 5	Regina Pats	1 – 2	OT	Seattle Thunderbirds	Brandt Centre	Recap
No scoring		First period		No scoring
No scoring		Second period		Ethan Bear (6) - pp - 4:55
12:11 - pp - Connor Hobbs (5)		Third period		No scoring
No scoring		First overtime period		Donovan Neuls (7) - 0:14
Tyler Brown (24 saves / 26 shots)		Goalie stats		Carl Stankowski (31 saves / 32 shots)

May 6	Regina Pats	4 – 3	OT	Seattle Thunderbirds	Brandt Centre	Recap
0:50 - Sam Steel (9)		First period		No scoring
18:35 - pp - Josh Mahura (5)		Second period		Tyler Adams (2) - 3:56; Turner Ottenbreit (2) - 4:12; Alexander True (9) - pp - 4:52
5:20 - Filip Ahl (5)		Third period		No scoring
5:22 - pp - Josh Mahura (6)		First overtime period		No scoring
Tyler Brown (27 saves / 30 shots)		Goalie stats		Carl Stankowski (22 saves / 26 shots)

May 9	Seattle Thunderbirds	2 – 3	Regina Pats	ShoWare Center	Recap
7:18 - pp - Alexander True (10); 14:48 - Sami Moilanen (5)		First period	Connor Hobbs (6) - pp - 3:27; Chase Harrison (1) - pp - 12:27
No scoring		Second period	Robbie Holmes (3) - 4:49
No scoring		Third period	No scoring
Carl Stankowski (25 shots / 28 shots)		Goalie stats	Tyler Brown (35 saves / 37 shots)

May 10	Seattle Thunderbirds	6 – 1	Regina Pats	ShoWare Center	Recap
16:06 - pp - Ryan Gropp (5); 16:25 - Sami Moilanen (6); 19:28 - Nolan Volcan (4)		First period	Sam Steel (10) - pp - 13:15
6:51 - Jarret Tyszka (2); 13:52 - pp - Alexander True (11); 18:51 - Keegan Kolesar (10)		Second period	No scoring
No scoring		Third period	No scoring
Carl Stankowski (18 saves / 19 shots)		Goalie stats	Tyler Brown (18 saves / 24 shots); Jordan Hollett (12 saves / 12 shots)

May 12	Seattle Thunderbirds	7 – 4	Regina Pats	ShoWare Center	Recap
Donovan Neuls (8) - pp - 5:09; Mathew Barzal (6) - pp - 6:01		First period	1:05 - Josh Mahura (7); 3:17 - Jeff de Wit (5)
Keegan Kolesar (11) - 16:40; Mathew Barzal (7) - pp - 17:37		Second period	9:37 - pp - Dawson Leedahl (12)
Nolan Volcan (5) - 2:21; Ryan Gropp (6) - 3:55; Turner Ottenbreit (3) - en - 19:58		Third period	11:22 - Austin Wagner (15)
Carl Stankowski (33 saves / 37 shots)		Goalie stats	Tyler Brown (32 saves / 38 shots)

May 14	Regina Pats	3 – 4	OT	Seattle Thunderbirds	Brandt Centre	Recap
Sam Steel (11) - pp - 7:18		First period		No scoring
No scoring		Second period		8:55 - Sami Moilanen (7)
Josh Mahura (8) - 11:50; Austin Wagner (16) - 13:12		Third period		14:38 - Ryan Gropp (7); 17:06 - pp - Keegan Kolesar (12)
No scoring		First overtime period		12:36 - Alexander True (12)
Tyler Brown (39 saves / 43 shots)		Goalie stats		Carl Stankowski (28 saves / 31 shots)

Seattle wins series 4 – 2

== Playoff scoring leaders ==
Note: GP = Games played; G = Goals; A = Assists; Pts = Points; PIM = Penalty minutes

Player	Team	GP	G	A	Pts	PIM
Keegan Kolesar	Seattle Thunderbirds	19	12	19	31	37
Sam Steel	Regina Pats	23	11	19	30	8
Reid Gardiner	Kelowna Rockets	17	15	13	28	6
Ethan Bear	Seattle Thunderbirds	17	6	20	26	12
Dawson Leedahl	Regina Pats	23	12	13	25	34
Mathew Barzal	Seattle Thunderbirds	16	7	18	25	16
Giorgio Estephan	Lethbridge Hurricanes	18	11	13	24	8
Tyler Wong	Lethbridge Hurricanes	20	11	13	24	14
Connor Hobbs	Regina Pats	23	6	18	24	22
Egor Babenko	Lethbridge Hurricanes	20	10	13	23	14

== Playoff leading goaltenders ==
Note: GP = Games played; Mins = Minutes played; W = Wins; L = Losses; GA = Goals Allowed; SO = Shutouts; SV& = Save percentage; GAA = Goals against average

Player	Team	GP	Mins	W	L	GA	SO	Sv%	GAA
Griffen Outhouse	Victoria Royals	6	458	2	4	16	0	.923	2.10
Connor Ingram	Kamloops Blazers	6	357	2	4	13	0	.946	2.18
Carter Hart	Everett Silvertips	10	691	4	6	28	1	.908	2.43
Zach Sawchenko	Moose Jaw Warriors	7	414	3	4	17	0	.923	2.46
Jordan Papirny	Swift Current Broncos	14	896	7	7	37	1	.935	2.48

== WHL awards ==
Ed Chynoweth Cup	WHL Champions	Seattle Thunderbirds	
Scotty Munro Memorial Trophy	Regular season champions	Regina Pats	
Four Broncos Memorial Trophy	Player of the Year	Sam Steel	Regina Pats
Bob Clarke Trophy	Top Scorer	Sam Steel	Regina Pats
Bill Hunter Memorial Trophy	Top Defenceman	Ethan Bear	Seattle Thunderbirds
Jim Piggott Memorial Trophy	Rookie of the Year	Aleksi Heponiemi	Swift Current Broncos
Del Wilson Trophy	Top Goaltender	Carter Hart	Everett Silvertips
WHL Plus-Minus Award	Top Plus-Minus Rating	Sergey Zborovskiy	Regina Pats
Brad Hornung Trophy	Most Sportsmanlike Player	Tyler Steenbergen	Swift Current Broncos
Daryl K. (Doc) Seaman Trophy	Scholastic Player of the Year	Brian King	Everett Silvertips
Jim Donlevy Memorial Trophy	Scholastic team of the Year	Victoria Royals	
Dunc McCallum Memorial Trophy	Coach of the Year	John Paddock	Regina Pats
Lloyd Saunders Memorial Trophy	Executive of the Year	John Paddock	Regina Pats
Allen Paradice Memorial Trophy	Top Official	Brett Iverson	
St. Clair Group Trophy	Marketing/Public Relations Award	Regina Pats	
Doug Wickenheiser Memorial Trophy	Humanitarian of the Year	Tyler Wong	Lethbridge Hurricanes
WHL Playoff MVP	WHL Finals Most Valuable Player	Mathew Barzal	Seattle Thunderbirds
Professional Hockey Achievement; Academic Recipient	Alumni Achievement Awards	Mark Reechi, and Kelvin Main	

=== All-Star teams ===
==== Eastern Conference ====
First Team		Pos.	Second Team	
Player	Team	Pos.	Player	Team
Zach Sawchenko	Moose Jaw Warriors	G	Logan Flodell	Saskatoon Blades
Connor Hobbs	Regina Pats	D	Sergey Zborovskiy	Regina Pats
Kale Clague	Brandon Wheat Kings	D	Jake Bean	Calgary Hitmen
Sam Steel*	Regina Pats	F	Tyler Steenbergen	Swift Current Broncos
Adam Brooks	Regina Pats	F	Jayden Halbgewachs	Moose Jaw Warriors
Tyler Wong	Lethbridge Hurricanes	F	Chad Butcher	Medicine Hat Tigers

* - unanimous selection

==== Western Conference ====
First Team		Pos.	Second Team	
Player	Team	Pos.	Player	Team
Carter Hart	Everett Silvertips	G	Connor Ingram	Kamloops Blazers
Ethan Bear*	Seattle Thunderbirds	D	Parker Wotherspoon	Tri-City Americans
Noah Juulsen	Everett Silvertips	D	Juuso Valimaki	Tri-City Americans
Mathew Barzal	Seattle Thunderbirds	F	Kailer Yamamoto	Spokane Chiefs
Cody Glass	Portland Winterhawks	F	Morgan Geekie	Tri-City Americans
Matthew Phillips	Victoria Royals	F	Kole Lind	Kelowna Rockets

* - unanimous selection

== See also ==
- List of WHL seasons
- 2016–17 OHL season
- 2016–17 QMJHL season
- 2016 in ice hockey
- 2017 in ice hockey

Preceded by 2015–16 WHL season	WHL seasons	Succeeded by 2017–18 WHL season
