= Austin Wagner =

Canadian ice hockey player (born 1997)

- Born: June 23, 1997 (age 29) Calgary, Alberta, Canada
- Height: 6 ft 1 in (185 cm)
- Weight: 195 lb (88 kg; 13 st 13 lb)
- Position: Left wing
- Shoots: Left
- DEL team Former teams: Loewen Frankfurt; Los Angeles Kings; Chicago Blackhawks; IK Oskarshamn; Chicago Wolves; Shanghai Dragons
- NHL draft: 99th overall, 2015; Los Angeles Kings
- Playing career: 2017–present

Austin Wagner (born June 23, 1997) is a Canadian professional ice hockey winger who currently plays with the Löwen Frankfurt in the Deutsche Eishockey Liga (DEL). He most recently played with the Shanghai Dragons in the Kontinental Hockey League (KHL). Wagner was drafted by the Los Angeles Kings in the fourth round, 99th overall, in the 2015 NHL entry draft.

== Early life ==
Wagner was born on June 23, 1997, in Calgary to parents Kevin and Linda, and has an older brother Tyler.

== Playing career ==
Although Wagner began playing hockey at the age of three, he also played lacrosse with the Calgary Axemen of the Alberta Lacrosse Association before fully committing to hockey. Wagner began his hockey career with the Blackfoot Minor Hockey Association before joining the Calgary Northstars. Although he played for the Calgary Northstars on the Bantam AA Blazers during their 2010–11 season, his playmaking ability and skill earned him a promotion to Midget AAA. During his AAA years, Wagner played for Team Calgary North at the 2012 Alberta Cup and Team Alberta at the 2012 Western Canada U16 Challenge Cup.

=== Major junior ===
Wagner was drafted in the 5th round of the 2012 WHL Bantam Draft by the Regina Pats at the age of 16. After attending the Pats training camp, he signed agreed to a contract with the team. He scored his first WHL goal in the first period of a 4–3 shootout loss to the Medicine Hat Tigers on December 15, 2013.

After his rookie season, in which Wagner scored 2 points in 42 games, the Pats changed coaches to John Paddock which Wagner says contributed to his production increase in his sophomore season. His sophomore year proved to be his breakout season with the Pats, as he scored 39 points in 61 games and was drafted 99th overall by the Los Angeles Kings in the 2015 NHL entry draft. Leading up to the draft, Wagner's final ranking by the NHL Central Scouting Bureau was 35th overall amongst North American skaters and third in Anaerobic Fitness: Peak Power Output. He attended the Kings training camp prior to the 2015 season but was returned to the Pats on September 24, 2015. Upon his return, Wagner once again had a breakout season and set new career highs with 62 points in 70 games.

Wagner again attended the Kings training camp prior to the 2016 season but was returned to the Pats on October 1, 2016. The 2016–17 season was another breakout season for Wagner, as he set new career highs in goals and assists. That season, the Pats qualified for the WHL playoffs. Wagner scored a goal in Game 6 of the Eastern Conference Championships against the Lethbridge Hurricanes to help push the Pats to the WHL Championship round for the first time since 1984. He ended the playoffs with 21 points in 22 games as the Pats ended up losing the WHL Championship Finals series to the Seattle Thunderbirds 4–2. As a result of his breakout season, Wagner was selected to attend the Canadian National Junior Team camp prior to the 2017 World Junior Ice Hockey Championships but he failed to make the final roster.

=== Professional ===
On March 6, 2017, Wagner signed an entry-level contract with the Los Angeles Kings. During the off-season prior to the 2017–18 season, Wagner required shoulder surgery to repair a torn labrum and dislocated bicep tendon. After he was medically cleared to play, Wagner was assigned to the Kings American Hockey League (AHL) affiliate, the Ontario Reign. Upon joining the AHL for his first season, he scored his first professional goal on December 9, 2017, in a 4–2 loss to the Texas Stars.

Wagner attended the Kings 2018 training camp, where he earned praise from teammates and coaches including Coach John Stevens who said, "He’s [Wagner] an explosive athlete, so he’s got extreme quickness and speed." Having made the Los Angeles Kings opening night roster for the 2018–19 season, Wagner made his NHL debut on October 5, 2018, in a 3–2 overtime loss to the San Jose Sharks. After playing in seven games for the Kings, Wagner and teammate Sean Walker were reassigned to Ontario Reign. During the first two months of the season, Wagner played 11 games with the Kings and five with the Reign. Following a rash of injuries, Wagner scored his first career NHL goal on November 21, 2018, in a 7–3 loss to the Colorado Avalanche. Although he missed four games due to a lower body injury, Wagner recorded 10 goals and seven assists within his first 50 games. Prior to the trade deadline, he played alongside Nate Thompson, who he considered a mentor, before joining Trevor Lewis and Kyle Clifford as their winger. At the end of the season, he was awarded the team's Jim Fox Community Service Award.

On September 1, 2020, as a restricted free agent, Wagner was signed by the Kings to a three-year, $3.4 million contract extension.

In his sixth year within the Kings organization, Wagner continued his tenure in the AHL with the Ontario Reign for the 2022–23 season. He notched nine goals and 12 points through 24 games before he was dealt at the NHL trade deadline by the Kings to the Chicago Blackhawks in exchange for future considerations on March 3, 2023. He returned to the NHL with the Blackhawks, registering a goal and assist through 7 regular season games to complete the year.

As a free agent from the Blackhawks, Wagner was later signed to a professional tryout deal with the Pittsburgh Penguins on August 30, 2023. However, he ended up joining the IK Oskarshamn in the Swedish Hockey League (SHL) for the 2023–24 season.

Leaving Sweden and Oskarshamn at the conclusion of his contract, Wagner returned to North America and was named to the training camp roster of the Chicago Wolves in the AHL for the 2024–25 season. On September 30, 2025, Wagner signed with the Shanghai Dragons of the Kontinental Hockey League (KHL).

== Personal life ==
In April 2020, Wagner, Adrian Kempe, Ben Hutton, and Blake Lizotte joined FaZe in an eSports gaming event to raise money for charities affected by COVID-19.

== Career statistics ==
			Regular season					Playoffs
Season	Team	League	GP	G	A	Pts	PIM	GP	G	A	Pts	PIM
2012–13	Calgary Northstars	AMHL	28	7	3	10	30	2	0	0	0	15
2012–13	Regina Pats	WHL	1	0	0	0	0	—	—	—	—	—
2013–14	Regina Pats	WHL	42	1	1	2	18	2	0	0	0	0
2014–15	Regina Pats	WHL	61	20	19	39	53	9	1	2	3	8
2015–16	Regina Pats	WHL	70	28	34	62	84	12	3	6	9	12
2016–17	Regina Pats	WHL	64	30	36	66	94	22	16	5	21	29
2017–18	Ontario Reign	AHL	50	10	7	17	62	3	0	0	0	2
2018–19	Los Angeles Kings	NHL	62	12	9	21	16	—	—	—	—	—
2018–19	Ontario Reign	AHL	9	3	0	3	16	—	—	—	—	—
2019–20	Los Angeles Kings	NHL	65	6	5	11	39	—	—	—	—	—
2020–21	Los Angeles Kings	NHL	44	4	4	8	15	—	—	—	—	—
2021–22	Ontario Reign	AHL	55	13	9	22	107	5	1	1	2	4
2022–23	Ontario Reign	AHL	24	9	3	12	33	—	—	—	—	—
2022–23	Chicago Blackhawks	NHL	7	1	1	2	0	—	—	—	—	—
2023–24	IK Oskarshamn	SHL	34	8	5	13	118	—	—	—	—	—
2024–25	Chicago Wolves	AHL	62	9	9	18	41	1	0	0	0	0
2025–26	Shanghai Dragons	KHL	57	8	9	17	32	—	—	—	—	—
NHL totals			178	23	19	42	70	—	—	—	—	—
