= Dillon Dubé =

Canadian ice hockey player (born 1998)

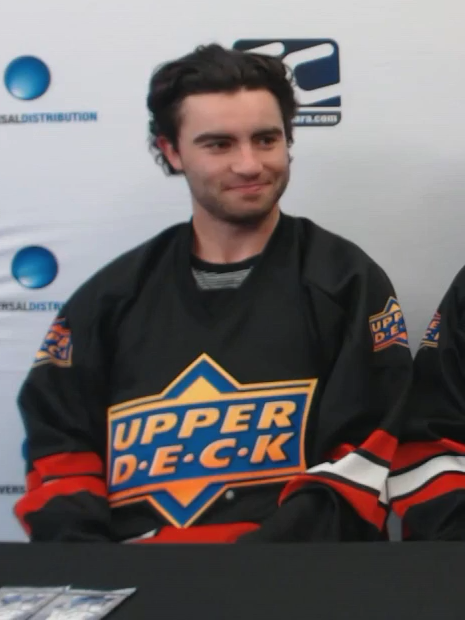
- Dubé in 2018
- Born: July 20, 1998 (age 28) Golden, British Columbia, Canada
- Height: 5 ft 11 in (180 cm)
- Weight: 185 lb (84 kg; 13 st 3 lb)
- Position: Forward
- Shoots: Left
- NHL team Former teams: St. Louis Blues; Calgary Flames; Dinamo Minsk
- NHL draft: 56th overall, 2016; Calgary Flames
- Playing career: 2017–present

Dillon Dubé (born July 20, 1998) is a Canadian professional ice hockey player who is a forward for the St. Louis Blues of the National Hockey League (NHL). Dubé was selected by the Calgary Flames of the National Hockey League (NHL) 56th overall in the 2016 NHL entry draft. He also played for Dinamo Minsk of the Kontinental Hockey League (KHL). In 2025, Dubé was legally acquitted after being charged in the 2018 Hockey Canada controversy and sexual assault.

== Playing career ==
=== Junior career ===
Dubé was drafted by the Kelowna Rockets of the Western Hockey League (WHL) in the first round of the 2013 WHL Bantam Draft. Dubé averaged 1.38 points per game in 40 games with the Rockets during the 2016–17 season. For the 2017–18 season he was named an alternate captain of the Rockets. That season, he recorded career-highs in goals, assists, and points and was awarded the Rockets President's Award as a player who made outstanding and significant accomplishments.

=== Professional career ===
==== Calgary Flames ====
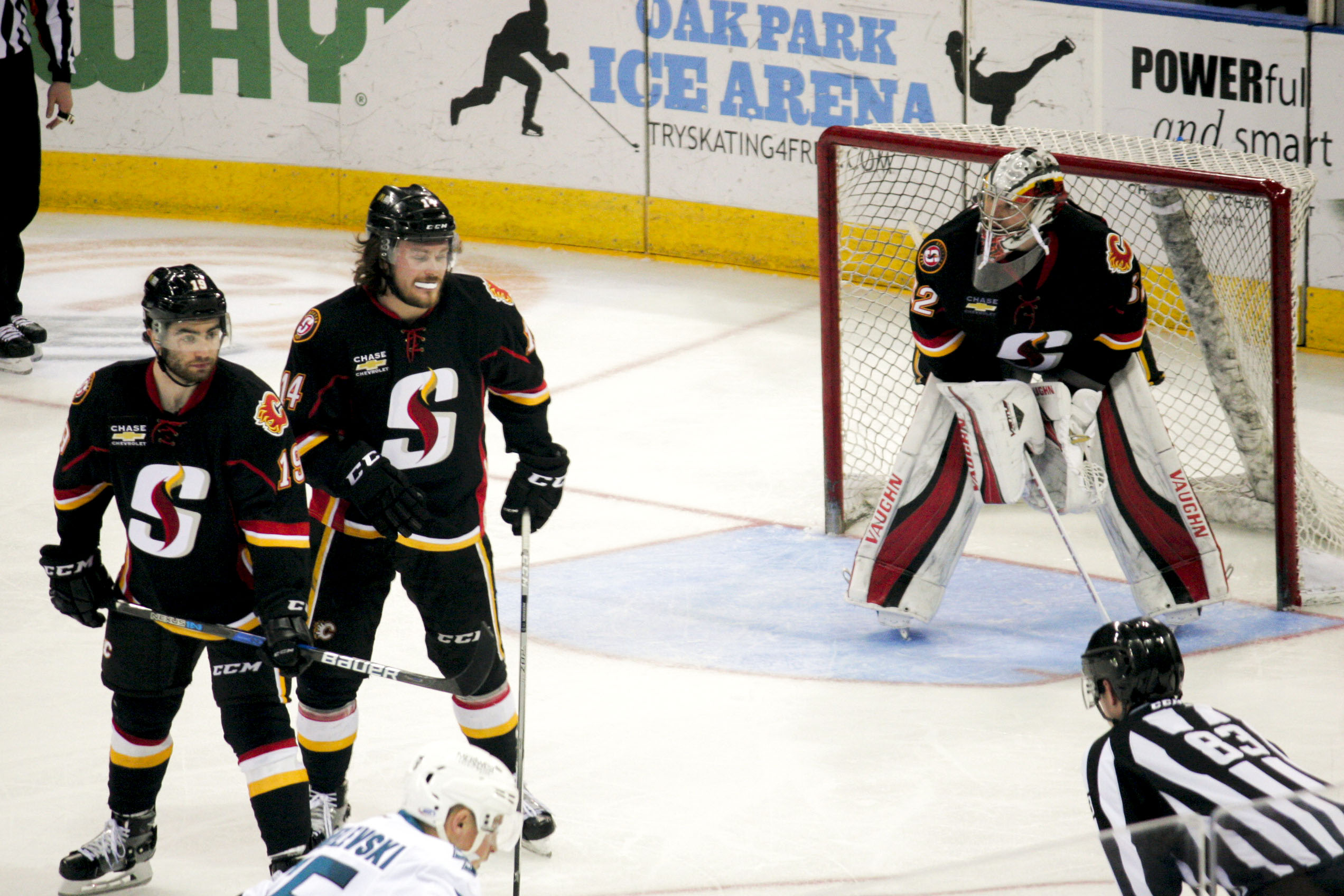
Dubé (far left) with Rasmus Andersson and Jon Gillies in 2018.

Dubé was selected by the Calgary Flames of the National Hockey League (NHL) 56th overall in the 2016 NHL entry draft. On March 24, 2017, he signed a three-year, entry-level contract with the Flames. After an early elimination in the 2018 playoffs, Dubé was assigned to the Calgary Flames American Hockey League (AHL) affiliate, the Stockton Heat. After participating in the Flames training camp, Dubé made the team's opening night roster for the 2018–19 season. He made his NHL debut on October 3, 2018, in a 5–2 loss to the Vancouver Canucks. On November 7, the Flames placed Dubé on injured reserve to recover from an upper body injury he suffered on November 3. Dubé returned to the Flames lineup on November 17, to play against the Edmonton Oilers, and he scored his first NHL goal on November 21, in a 6–3 win over the Winnipeg Jets. Dubé was re-assigned to the Stockton Heat on November 29, but he was recalled a month later on December 29, after playing in eight games and recording eight points. Dubé scored the game-winning goal in the Flames 4–0 win over the Winnipeg Jets in the 2020 Stanley Cup qualifiers.

On August 26, 2021, Dubé signed a three-year, $6.9 million contract with the Flames.

On January 21, 2024, the Flames announced that Dubé would begin an indefinite leave from the team, citing his mental health and saying that he was "under the care of health professionals". On January 30, Dubé was charged with sexual assault after a 2018 alleged assault in London, Ontario. The team released a statement saying that they "had no knowledge of pending charges at the time Dillon's request for a leave of absence was granted." On February 5, the London Police Service announced that Dubé had been charged with one count of sexual assault. On July 24, 2025, Dubé was found not guilty of sexual assault after he was acquitted following the judge declaring that the evidence was not credible or reliable.

A restricted free agent at the end of his contract in 2024, he did not receive a qualifying offer from the Flames and became an unrestricted free agent. On July 1, 2024, Dubé signed a one-year contract with HC Dinamo Minsk of the Kontinental Hockey League.

==== St. Louis Blues ====
On September 11, 2025, the NHL announced Dubé would be eligible to sign a contract on October 15, and would be eligible to return to play on December 1. It was announced on December 10 that Dubé signed a professional tryout contract with the St. Louis Blues' AHL affiliate, the Springfield Thunderbirds. Appearing with the Thunderbirds for the remainder of the 2025–26 season, Dubé registered 37 points in 46 games.

As a free agent, Dubé returned to the NHL, agreeing to a one-year, $850,000 contract with the St. Louis Blues for the 2026–27 season on July 1, 2026.

On October 8, 2026, Dubé scored his first NHL goal since November 16, 2023, a shorthanded goal in the Blues' home opener, which ended in a 3–2 overtime loss to the San Jose Sharks. Early in the first period, he had gone head-first into the boards after an awkward collision, and on October 10 the Blues placed him on injured reserve with a neck injury and said he would miss eight weeks.

== International play ==
Medal record

Representing Canada

Men's ice hockey

World Junior Championships
Gold medal – first place	2018 Canada	
Silver medal – second place	2017 Canada	

Dubé won a silver medal with Team Canada's under-20 team for the 2017 World Junior Championships. Dubé was later selected to captain Team Canada's under-20 team for the 2018 World Junior Championships in Buffalo, New York, winning gold.

On March 27, 2023, as part of the development of the sexual assault scandal, Hockey Canada announced that every member of Canada's 2018 World Junior team would be ineligible for all international competitions until investigations were complete. On August 12, 2026, Hockey Canada updated its suspensions and stated that due to a breach of conduct, Dubé would be suspended from international competitions through November 10, 2028.

== Personal life ==
On January 30, 2024, Dubé, Cal Foote, Michael McLeod, Carter Hart, and Alex Formenton were charged with sexual assault over a 2018 alleged assault in London, Ontario. On February 5, 2024, the London Police Service announced that Dubé had been charged with one count of sexual assault. The trial began in April 2025, and trial proceedings were declared a mistrial twice, before the jury was dismissed and the justice adjudicated the case herself. He was acquitted on July 24, 2025, of the charges laid against him.

== Career statistics ==
=== Regular season and playoffs ===
			Regular season					Playoffs
Season	Team	League	GP	G	A	Pts	PIM	GP	G	A	Pts	PIM
2014–15	Kelowna Rockets	WHL	45	17	10	27	12	18	5	6	11	8
2015–16	Kelowna Rockets	WHL	65	26	40	66	50	18	2	5	7	16
2016–17	Kelowna Rockets	WHL	40	20	35	55	40	17	7	14	21	18
2016–17	Stockton Heat	AHL	—	—	—	—	—	1	0	0	0	0
2017–18	Kelowna Rockets	WHL	53	38	46	84	52	4	2	0	2	14
2017–18	Stockton Heat	AHL	6	0	4	4	2	—	—	—	—	—
2018–19	Stockton Heat	AHL	37	15	24	39	24	—	—	—	—	—
2018–19	Calgary Flames	NHL	25	1	4	5	4	—	—	—	—	—
2019–20	Stockton Heat	AHL	13	4	9	13	8	—	—	—	—	—
2019–20	Calgary Flames	NHL	45	6	10	16	6	10	4	1	5	2
2020–21	Calgary Flames	NHL	51	11	11	22	20	—	—	—	—	—
2021–22	Calgary Flames	NHL	79	18	14	32	20	12	0	1	1	2
2022–23	Calgary Flames	NHL	82	18	27	45	47	—	—	—	—	—
2023–24	Calgary Flames	NHL	43	3	4	7	8	—	—	—	—	—
2024–25	Dinamo Minsk	KHL	42	4	7	11	25	4	0	0	0	2
2025–26	Springfield Thunderbirds	AHL	46	20	17	37	10	12	5	3	8	6
NHL totals			325	57	70	127	105	22	4	2	6	4

=== International ===
Year	Team	Event	Result	GP	G	A	Pts	PIM
2015	Canada	IH18	1st place, gold medalist(s)	4	1	2	3	2
2017	Canada	WJC	2nd place, silver medalist(s)	7	0	3	3	4
2018	Canada	WJC	1st place, gold medalist(s)	7	3	2	5	2
Junior totals				18	4	7	11	8
