= 2016 IIHF World U18 Championships =

2016 IIHF U18 World Championship

Tournament details
- Host country: United States
- Venues: 2 (in 1 host city)
- Dates: April 14–24, 2016
- Teams: 10

Final positions
- Champions: Finland (3rd title)
- Runners-up: Sweden
- Third place: United States

Tournament statistics
- Games played: 31
- Goals scored: 233 (7.52 per game)
- Attendance: 71,505 (2,307 per game)
- Scoring leader: (Canada) Tyson Jost (15 points)

Awards
- MVP: (United States) Clayton Keller

The 2016 IIHF U18 World Championship was the 18th IIHF World U18 Championship. It was played from April 14 to 24, 2016 in Grand Forks, North Dakota, United States.

== Venues ==
Ralph Engelstad Arena Capacity: 11,643	Icon Sports Center (Judd/Rydell)
United States – Grand Forks, North Dakota	United States – Grand Forks, North Dakota

== Top Division ==
=== Officials ===
The IIHF selected 12 referees and 10 linesmen to work the 2016 IIHF U18 World Championship.
They were the following:

Referees

- (Slovakia) Vladimir Baluska
- (Denmark) Jacob Grumsen
- (Norway) Roystian Hansen
- (Czech Republic) Jan Hribik
- (Germany) Sirko Hunnius
- (Canada) Jeff Ingram
- (Sweden) Marcus Linde
- (Finland) Jari-Pukka Pajula
- (United States) Brett Sheva
- (Slovenia) Viktor Trilar
- (United States) Cameron Voss
- (Austria) Shane Warschaw

Linesmen

- (United Kingdom) Andrew Dalton
- (United States) Jake Davis
- (Belarus) Dmitry Golyak
- (Sweden) Johannes Kack
- (Austria) David Nothegger
- (Slovakia) Tibor Rovensky
- (Finland) Joonas Saha
- (Czech Republic) Libor Suchanek
- (Russia) Alexander Sysuev
- (Canada) Nathan Vanoosten

=== Preliminary round ===
==== Group A ====
Pos	Team	Pld	W	OTW	OTL	L	GF	GA	GD	Pts	Qualification
1	United States	4	4	0	0	0	30	4	+26	12	Advance to Quarterfinals
2	Sweden	4	2	1	0	1	18	11	+7	8	Advance to Quarterfinals
3	Russia	4	1	1	0	2	12	14	−2	5	Advance to Quarterfinals
4	Switzerland	4	0	1	1	2	7	18	−11	3	Advance to Quarterfinals
5	Latvia	4	0	0	2	2	8	28	−20	2	Advance to Relegation round

Source: IIHF

All times are local. (Central Daylight Time – UTC−05:00)

April 14, 2016; 12:00	Latvia	4–5 OT (1–0, 1–3, 2–1) (OT 0–1)	Switzerland	Ralph Engelstad Arena, Grand Forks; Attendance: 2,538

Game reference

Gustavs Grigals
Mareks Mitens
Goalies
Matteo Ritz
Referees:
(Slovakia) Vladimir Baluska
(United States) Brett Sheva
Linesmen:
(United Kingdom) Andrew Dalton
(United States) Jake Davis

Krastenbergs (Smons) – 03:05	1–0
	1–1	20:40 – Simic (Riva, Hischier)
	1–2	24:05 – Simic (Hischier)
Vulkanovs (Kļaviņš, Krastenbergs) – 25:47	2–2
	2–3	39:44 – Geisser (Hischier)
Ezītis (Apfelbaums) – 45:55	3–3
	3–4	50:33 – Kurashev (Lust, Volejnicek)
Kļaviņš (Krastenbergs, Kaļķis) – 54:02	4–4
	4–5	64:53 – Volejnicek (le Coultre) (PP)

8 min
Penalties
6 min
20
Shots
36

April 14, 2016; 19:30	Russia	2–8 (1–2, 1–2, 0–4)	United States	Ralph Engelstad Arena, Grand Forks; Attendance: 4,137

Game reference

Maxim Zhukov
Daniil Tarasov
Goalies
Jake Oettinger
Referees:
(Sweden) Marcus Linde
(Slovenia) Viktor Trilar
Linesmen:
(Finland) Joonas Saha
(Czech Republic) Libor Suchanek

	0–1	03:44 – Keller (Fox)
	0–2	04:28 – Sanchez (Frederic)
Y. Alexeyev (Samorukov) – 05:17	1–2
I. Kozlov (Lipanov) – 22:21	2–2
	2–3	36:18 – Keller (Yamamoto)
	2–4	36:32 – Bellows (Anderson, Greenway)
	2–5	46:19 – Yamamoto (Krys)
	2–6	47:30 – Anderson (Krys, Keller) (PP)
	2–7	50:46 – Yamamoto (Brown, Mittelstadt) (PP)
	2–8	54:00 – Brown (Yamamoto, Luce)

4 min
Penalties
4 min
21
Shots
45

April 15, 2016; 15:00	Sweden	4–3 OT (2–0, 0–1, 1–2) (OT 1–0)	Latvia	Ralph Engelstad Arena, Grand Forks; Attendance: 2,282

Game reference

Filip Larsson
Goalies
Mareks Mitens
Referees:
(Denmark) Jacob Grumsen
(Finland) Jari-Pekka Pajula
Linesmen:
(Russia) Alexander Sysuev
(Canada) Nathan Vanoosten

Bratt (Danielsson) – 01:26	1–0
Thilander (Steen) (PP) – 09:28	2–0
	2–1	29:06 – Kļaviņš (Svars)
	2–2	40:50 – Apfelbaums
	2–3	43:16 – Zeile
Nylander (Davidsson) (EA) – 59:41	3–3
Moverare (Söderlund) – 64:36	4–3

6 min
Penalties
10 min
47
Shots
15

April 16, 2016; 12:00	Switzerland	1–2 OT (0–0, 0–1, 1–0) (OT 0–1)	Russia	Ralph Engelstad Arena, Grand Forks; Attendance: 2,538

Game reference

Matteo Ritz
Goalies
Daniil Tarasov
Referees:
(Norway) Ryostain Hansen
(Canada) Jeff Ingram
Linesmen:
(Sweden) Johannes Kack
(Austria) David Nothegger

	0–1	33:21 – Y. Alexeyev (Kostin, Zaitsev)
Hischier (Miranda) – 49:07	1–1
	1–2	61:58 – Dyomin (A. Alexeyev)

8 min
Penalties
4 min
22
Shots
28

April 16, 2016; 15:45	United States	6–1 (1–0, 3–0, 2–1)	Sweden	Ralph Engelstad Arena, Grand Forks; Attendance: 3,401

Game reference

Joseph Woll
Goalies
Filip Larsson
Referees:
(Czech Republic) Jan Hribik
(Germany) Sirko Hunnius
Linesmen:
(Slovakia) Tibor Rovensky
(Finland) Joonas Saha

Mittelstadt (Brown, Yamamoto) – 17:51	1–0
Bellows (Fox) – 22:17	2–0
Lindgren (McPhee) – 23:58	3–0
Greenway (Keller, Fox) (SH) – 37:17	4–0
Howdeshell (Brown) – 42:42	5–0
	5–1	50:32 – Liljegren (Lindström, Nylander) (PP)
Anderson (Krys, Keller) (PP) – 52:03	6–1

24 min
Penalties
6 min
24
Shots
35

April 17, 2016; 15:00	Latvia	1–12 (0–2, 1–6, 0–4)	United States	Ralph Engelstad Arena, Grand Forks; Attendance: 2,560

Game reference

Niklāvs Rauza
Gustavs Grigals
Goalies
Jake Oettinger
Referees:
(Sweden) Marcus Linde
(Slovenia) Viktor Trilar
Linesmen:
(Sweden) Johannes Kack
(Canada) Nathan Vanoosten

	0–1	14:27 – Sanchez (Frederic, Hellickson)
	0–2	16:29 – Anderson (Bellows, Greenway)
	0–3	20:30 – Yamamoto (Brown, Mittelstadt)
Nazarovs (Štrombergs, Rauza) (SH) – 28:26	1–3
	1–4	29:38 – Walker (Howdeshell, Fox)
	1–5	30:03 – Frederic (Lockwood, Hellickson)
	1–6	30:47 – Fox (Bellows, Keller)
	1–7	36:31 – Yamamoto (Brown, Martin) (EA)
	1–8	37:30 – Pastujov (Walker)
	1–9	48:04 – Keller (Lockwood, Fox)
	1–10	51:56 – Bellows (Keller)
	1–11	55:24 – Frederic (Greenway, Lockwood) (PP)
	1–12	58:44 – Frederic (SH)

14 min
Penalties
37 min
23
Shots
58

April 18, 2016; 12:00	Russia	7–0 (4–0, 2–0, 1–0)	Latvia	Ralph Engelstad Arena, Grand Forks; Attendance: 2,754

Game reference

Daniil Tarasov
Goalies
Mareks Mittens
Gustav Grigals
Referees:
(Czech Republic) Jan Hribik
(Germany) Sirko Hunnius
Linesmen:
(United States) Jake Davis
(Austria) David Nothegger

Svechnikov (Dyomin, Samorukov) (PP) – 11:09	1–0
Lipanov (Chekhovich, Baranov) – 17:43	2–0
Bitsadze (Kostin) – 17:57	3–0
Rubinchik (Lipanov) (SH) – 18:55	4–0
Bitsadze (Kostin, Y. Alexeyev) – 25:49	5–0
Marushev (Kuznetsov, Samorukov) – 34:35	6–0
Marushev (Kuznetsov, A. Alexeyev) (PP2) – 44:06	7–0

24 min
Penalties
32 min
46
Shots
20

April 18, 2016; 15:45	Switzerland	1–8 (1–1, 0–3, 0–4)	Sweden	Ralph Engelstad Arena, Grand Forks; Attendance: 2,787

Game reference

Matteo Ritz
Leo Chuard
Goalies
Filip Gustavsson
Referees:
(United States) Cameron Voss
(Austria) Shane Warschaw
Linesmen:
(United Kingdom) Andrew Dalton
(Canada) Nathan Vanoosten

Eggenberger (Riva, Lust) – 08:55	1–0
	1–1	15:04 – Nylander (Andersson, Pettersson)
	1–2	22:33 – Davidsson (Liljegren, Nylander) (PP)
	1–3	36:09 – Davidsson (Bratt, Nylander) (PP)
	1–4	38:56 – Nylander (Pettersson)
	1–5	46:28 – Wahlgren (Andersson, Nylander) (PP)
	1–6	48:17 – Wahlgren (Nylander) (PP)
	1–7	49:25 – Wahlgren (Pettersson, Andersson) (PP)
	1–8	50:04 – Bokvist (Hugg, Sellgren)

18 min
Penalties
8 min
13
Shots
36

April 19, 2016; 12:00	Sweden	5–1 (1–0, 3–0, 1–1)	Russia	Ralph Engelstad Arena, Grand Forks; Attendance: 2,619

Game reference

Filip Gustavsson
Filip Larsson
Goalies
Maxim Zhukov
Daniil Tarasov
Referees:
(Slovakia) Vladimir Baluska
(United States) Brett Sheva
Linesmen:
(Slovakia) Tibor Rovensky
(Finland) Joonas Saha

Andersson (Pettersson, Liljegren) – 11:52	1–0
Wahlgren (Lindström, Moverare) – 20:52	2–0
Steen (Liljegren, Davidsson) – 22:20	3–0
Andersson (Pettersson, Thilander) (PP) – 23:19	4–0
Jonsson Fjällby – 51:37	5–0
	5–1	56:19 – Svechnikov (Dyomin, Samorukov)

8 min
Penalties
8 min
41
Shots
23

April 19, 2016; 19:30	United States	4–0 (2–0, 1–0, 1–0)	Switzerland	Ralph Engelstad Arena, Grand Forks; Attendance: 2,267

Game reference

Joseph Woll
Goalies
Philip Wüthrich
Referees:
(Denmark) Jacob Grumsen
(Finland) Jari-Pekka Pajula
Linesmen:
(Russia) Alexander Sysuev
(Canada) Nathan Vanoosten

Mittelstadt (Brown, Martin) – 12:46	1–0
Yamamoto (Lindgren, Martin) (PP) – 16:43	2–0
McPhee (Lockwood) – 25:24	3–0
Mittelstadt (Brown, Yamamoto) – 56:23	4–0

2 min
Penalties
8 min
37
Shots
15

==== Group B ====
Pos	Team	Pld	W	OTW	OTL	L	GF	GA	GD	Pts	Qualification
1	Canada	4	4	0	0	0	19	5	+14	12	Advance to Quarterfinals
2	Finland	4	2	1	0	1	13	9	+4	8	Advance to Quarterfinals
3	Slovakia	4	2	0	0	2	12	14	−2	6	Advance to Quarterfinals
4	Czech Republic	4	1	0	1	2	16	13	+3	4	Advance to Quarterfinals
5	Denmark	4	0	0	0	4	9	28	−19	0	Advance to Relegation round

Source: IIHF

All times are local. (Central Daylight Time – UTC−05:00)

April 14, 2016; 15:45	Slovakia	5–4 (4–3, 0–1, 1–0)	Denmark	Ralph Engelstad Arena, Grand Forks; Attendance: 2,557

Game reference

Dávid Hrenák
Roman Durný
Goalies
Kasper Krog
Mads-Emil Gransoe
Referees:
(Norway) Roystian Hansen
(Czech Republic) Jan Hribik
Linesmen:
(Belarus) Dmitry Golyak
(Sweden) Johannes Kack

Lacka (Fehérváry) – 02:43	1–0
	1–1	03:25 – Schmidt-Svejstrup (Mathiasen-Wejse)
	1–2	03:58 – Molge
	1–3	04:21 – Krag (Røndbjerg)
Solenský (Ružička) – 04:55	2–3
Buček – 10:59	3–3
Solenský (Ružička, Lacka) – 17:45	4–3
	4–4	25:54 – Blichfeldt (Krag, Gatz) (PP)
Roman – 48:11	5–4

10 min
Penalties
8 min
33
Shots
16

April 14, 2016; 18:00	Czech Republic	3–4 GWS (1–3, 0–0, 2–0) (OT 0–0) (SO: 0–1)	Finland	Icon Sports Center, Grand Forks; Attendance: 406

Game reference

Josef Kořenář
Goalies
Leevi Laakso
Referees:
(Germany) Sirko Hunnius
(Canada) Jeff Ingram
Linesmen:
(Austria) David Nothegger
(Slovakia) Tibor Rovensky

	0–1	09:58 – Tolvanen (Tuulola) (PP)
Zadina (Reichel, Hájek) (PP) – 12:31	1–1
	1–2	14:19 – Vesalainen (Tolvanen)
	1–3	16:24 – Oksanen (Somppi, Kuokkanen) (PP)
Pavlík (Zadina) – 45:41	2–3
Najman (Kvasnička, Bélohorský) – 52:11	3–3

Reichel (miss)
Zadina (miss)
Najman (miss)
Shootout
(miss) Tolvanen
(miss) Räsänen
Kuokkanen
8 min
Penalties
8 min
29
Shots
47

April 15, 2016; 19:00	Denmark	2–10 (2–2, 0–5, 0–3)	Canada	Ralph Engelstad Arena, Grand Forks; Attendance: 2,475

Game reference

Mats-Emil Gransoe
Kasper Krog
Goalies
Stuart Skinner
Referees:
(United States) Cameron Voss
(United States) Shane Warschaw
Linesmen:
(United States) Jake Davis
(Belarus) Dimitri Golyak

	0–1	01:05 – Kyrou (Morrison, Stanley)
	0–2	01:31 – Malenstyn (Laberge, Fabbro)
Schmidt-Svejstrup (D. Nielsen) – 05:31	1–2
Blichfeldt (Gatz, Krag) (PP) – 06:10	2–2
	2–3	20:27 – Kyrou (Jost, Hague)
	2–4	26:30 – Comtois
	2–5	27:21 – Shaw (Laberge, Phillips) (PP)
	2–6	27:55 – Bitten (Fabbro, Jost) (PP)
	2–7	34:13 – Kyrou (Bitten, Quenneville)
	2–8	44:26 – Kyrou (Jost, Tippet)
	2–9	50:02 – Jost (Quenneville, Morrison)
	2–10	53:42 – Jost (Fabbro, Bitten) (PP)

12 min
Penalties
10 min
9
Shots
52

April 16, 2016; 18:00	Finland	4–2 (1–0, 2–2, 1–0)	Slovakia	Icon Sports Center, Grand Forks; Attendance: 427

Game reference

Leevi Laakso
Goalies
Roman Durný
Referees:
(Denmark) Jacob Grumsen
(United States) Cameron Voss
Linesmen:
(United Kingdom) Andrew Dalton
(Czech Republic) Libor Suchanek

Räsänen (Vesalainen, Välimäki) – 13:20	1–0
Vesalainen (Räsänen) – 22:02	2–0
	2–1	28:24 – Buček (Fehérváry) (PP)
Mäkinen (Jääskä) – 33:39	3–1
	3–2	34:01 – Ružička (Fehérváry)
Mäkinen (Vesalainen) – 52:19	4–2

16 min
Penalties
8 min
32
Shots
16

April 16, 2016; 19:30	Canada	3–1 (2–0, 1–0, 0–1)	Czech Republic	Ralph Engelstad Arena, Grand Forks; Attendance: 2,478

Game reference

Evan Fitzpatrick
Goalies
Josef Kořenář
Referees:
(Slovakia) Vladimir Baluska
(Finland) Jari-Pekka Pajula
Linesmen:
(Belarus) Dmitri Golyak
(Russia) Alexander Sysuev

Howden (Fabbro) – 17:41	1–0
Quenneville (Jost, Fabbro) (PP) – 18:58	2–0
Howden (Shaw) – 25:17	3–0
	3–1	42:35 – Zadina (PP)

14 min
Penalties
8 min
28
Shots
39

April 17, 2016; 19:00	Denmark	1–4 (1–2, 0–1, 0–1)	Finland	Ralph Engelstad Arena, Grand Forks; Attendance: 2,644

Game reference

Kasper Krog
Goalies
Leevi Laakso
Referees:
(United States) Brett Sheva
(Austria) Shane Warschaw
Linesmen:
(Slovakia) Tibor Rovensky
(Czech Republic) Libor Suchanek

	0–1	07:38 – Kuokkanen (Mäkinen)
	0–2	14:56 – Tuulola (Kotkansalo)
Mathiasen-Wejse (Krag, Heine) (PP) – 16:17	1–2
	1–3	34:16 – Tolvanen (Räsänen, Vaakanainen)
	1–4	59:40 – Tolvanen (Räsänen, Kotkansalo) (ENG)

6 min
Penalties
6 min
10
Shots
46

April 18, 2016; 18:00	Czech Republic	9–2 (1–0, 2–1, 6–1)	Denmark	Icon Sports Center, Grand Forks; Attendance: 417

Game reference

Josef Kořenář
Goalies
Mads-Emil Gransoe
Referees:
(Canada) Jeff Ingram
(Sweden) Marcus Linde
Linesmen:
(Finland) Joonas Saha
(Russia) Alexander Sysuev

Kantner (Kousal, Najman) – 6:03	1–0
	1–1	31:00 – D. Nielsen
Kurovský (Budík, Karafiát) – 32:09	2–1
Najman – 32:49	3–1
Kantner (Najman, Kousal) – 41:37	4–1
Havelka (Zachar) – 45:12	5–1
Zadina (Reichel, Budík) – 49:52	6–1
Najman (Kvasnička, Kousal) – 50:45	7–1
Karafiát (Kurovský) – 52:12	8–1
	8–2	54:26 – Blichfeldt (Krag) (PP2)
Doudera (Hájek, Najman) – 59:59	9–2

14 min
Penalties
22 min
35
Shots
22

April 18, 2016; 19:30	Canada	3–1 (0–0, 3–0, 0–1)	Slovakia	Ralph Engelstad Arena, Grand Forks; Attendance: 2,122

Game reference

Stuart Skinner
Goalies
Roman Durny
Referees:
(United States) Brett Sheva
(Slovenia) Viktor Trilar
Linesmen:
(Sweden) Johannes Kack
(Czech Republic) Libor Suchanek

Quenneville (Jost) – 23:50	1–0
Howden (Gregor, Hall) – 28:16	2–0
Katchouk (Jost, Bitten) – 39:20	3–0
	3–1	50:17 – Buček (SH)

18 min
Penalties
10 min
46
Shots
20

April 19, 2016; 15:45	Finland	1–3 (0–2, 0–0, 1–1)	Canada	Ralph Engelstad Arena, Grand Forks; Attendance: 2,832

Game reference

Leevi Laakso
Goalies
Evan Fitzpatrick
Referees:
(Norway) Roystian Hansen
(Sweden) Marcus Linde
Linesmen:
(United Kingdom) Andrew Dalton
(Austria) David Nothegger

	0–1	07:16 – Laberge (Kyrou, Shaw) (PP)
	0–2	12:30 – Quenneville
Tuulola (Salo, Nurmi) – 54:44	1–2
	1–3	59:24 – Jost (McLeod, Chychrun) (ENG)

6 min
Penalties
18 min
27
Shots
24

April 19, 2016; 18:00	Slovakia	4–3 (1–2, 1–1, 2–0)	Czech Republic	Icon Sports Center, Grand Forks; Attendance: 463

Game reference

Roman Durný
Goalies
Joseph Kořenář
Referees:
(United States) Cameron Voss
(Austria) Shane Warschaw
Linesmen:
(United States) Jake Davis
(Belarus) Dmitry Golyak

	0–1	01:18 – Zachar (Havelka)
Liška (Smolka) – 03:18	1–1
	1–2	12:22 – Karafiát (Bělohorský, Kurovský)
	1–3	20:43 – Zadina (Doudera, Reichel)
Bjalončík (Kmec) (SH) – 35:01	2–3
Solenský (PS) – 42:09	3–3
Buček (Studenič, Roman) – 56:33	4–3

16 min
Penalties
10 min
35
Shots
36

=== Relegation round ===
April 21, 2016; 11:00	Latvia	5–1 (1–1, 1–0, 3–0)	Denmark	Icon Sports Center, Grand Forks; Attendance: 101

Game reference

Gustav Grigals
Goalies
Kasper Krog
Referees:
(Norway) Roystian Hansen
(Slovenia) Viktor Trilar
Linesmen:
(Austria) David Nothegger
(Slovakia) Tibor Rovensky

Smirnovs (Zeile, Svars) – 13:25	1–0
	1–1	15:30 – Blichfeldt (Gatz) (PP)
Vulkanovs (Zeile, Svars) (PP) – 28:50	2–1
Zeile (Svars, Krastenbergs) (PP) – 51:14	3–1
Kļaviņš (Svars) – 55:12	4–1
Kļaviņš (ENG) – 58:37	5–1

18 min
Penalties
10 min
26
Shots
22

April 22, 2016; 19:00	Denmark	4–1 (1–0, 1–0, 2–1)	Latvia	Ralph Engelstad Arena, Grand Forks; Attendance: 3,703

Game reference

Kasper Krog
Goalies
Mareks Mitens
Referees:
(Finland) Jari-Pekka Pajula
(Austria) Shane Warschaw
Linesmen:
(Czech Republic) Libor Suchanek
(Russia) Alexander Sysuev

Molge (Blichfeldt, Larsen) – 17:00	1–0
Mortensen (Mohr, Røndbjerg) – 21:24	2–0
	2–1	56:55 – Bļugers (Krastenbergs, Kļaviņš) (EA)
Jessen (Mathiasen-Wejse) (ENG) – 57:19	3–1
Grundtvig (Rondbjerg) – 58:04	4–1

10 min
Penalties
4 min
22
Shots
32

April 24, 2016; 11:00	Latvia	4–3 GWS (0–1, 0–1, 3–1) (OT: 0–0) (SO: 1–0)	Denmark	Ralph Engelstad Arena, Grand Forks; Attendance: 3,039

Game reference

Gustavs Grigals
Goalies
Kasper Krog
Referees:
(Slovakia) Vladimir Baluska
(Canada) Jeff Ingram
Linesmen:
(United States) Jake Davis
(Canada) Nathan Vanoosten

	0–1	11:31 – Mathiasen-Wejse (Grundtvig, Gatz) (PP)
	0–2	24:05 – Gatz (Krag, Blichfeldt) (PP2)
Krastenbergs (Nazarovs, Svars) (PP) – 44:57	1–2
	1–3	48:17 – Grundtvig (Gath, Mortensen)
Smirnovs (Smons) (PP) – 53:56	2–3
Zeile (Krastenbergs, Grigals) – 58:53	3–3

Krastenbergs
Vulkanovs (miss)
Ģēģeris (miss)
Smirnovs
Shootout
(miss) Schmidt-Svejstrup
(miss) Blichfeldt
Heine
(miss) Heine
37 min
Penalties
16 min
41
Shots
25

Latvia won two games to one, relegating Denmark

=== Playoff round ===
Quarterfinals
1A	United States	8
4B	Czech Republic	0
2B	Finland	4
3A	Russia	3
1B	Canada	9
4A	Switzerland	1
2A	Sweden	7
3B	Slovakia	2

Semifinals
1A	United States	2
2B	Finland	4
1B	Canada	5
2A	Sweden	6

Finals
2B	Finland	6
2A	Sweden	1
Bronze medal game
1A	United States	10
1B	Canada	3

==== Quarterfinals ====
April 21, 2016	Finland	4–3 (1–0, 3–2, 0–1)	Russia	Ralph Engelstad Arena, Grand Forks; Attendance: 2,117

Game reference

Ukko-Pekka Luukkonen
Goalies
Daniil Tarasov
Referees:
(Slovakia) Vladimir Baluska
(Sweden) Marcus Linde
Linesmen:
(United States) Jake Davis
(Sweden) Johannes Kack

Tolvanen (Vesalainen, Jokiharju) – 16:19	1–0
Puljujärvi (Heiskanen) (PP) – 26:31	2–0
	2–1	30:07 – Marushev (Lobanov, Kuznetsov)
Tolvanen (Vaakanainen) – 30:48	3–1
	3–2	31:05 – Samorukov (Alexeyev)
Tolvanen (Puljujärvi, Räsänen) (PP) – 39:39	4–2
	4–3	52:31 – Alexeyev (Bitsadze, Kostin) (PP)

8 min
Penalties
10 min
32
Shots
26

April 21, 2016; 15:30	Canada	9–1 (2–0, 3–1, 4–0)	Switzerland	Ralph Engelstad Arena, Grand Forks; Attendance: 2,164

Game reference

Evan Fitzpatrick
Goalies
Philip Wüthrich
Referees:
(Denmark) Jacob Grumsen
(United States) Cameron Voss
Linesmen:
(United Kingdom) Andrew Dalton
(Finland) Joonas Saha

Jost (Bitten, Fabbro) (SH) – 06:40	1–0
Quenneville (Howden, Jost) (PP) – 11:56	2–0
Jost (Howden) (PP) – 23:36	3–0
Morrison (Howden, Fabbro) – 30:17	4–0
McLeod (Kyrou) – 36:19	5–0
	5–1	38:37 – Loosli (Kuruashev, Riva) (PP)
Howden (Fabbro, Jost) (PP) – 42:01	6–1
Jost (Bitten, Quenneville) (PP) – 50:07	7–1
McLeod (Tippett, Comtois) – 51:21	8–1
Howden (Gregor, Morrison) – 55:25	9–1

16 min
Penalties
10 min
45
Shots
26

April 21, 2016; 18:00	Sweden	7–2 (3–1, 3–0, 1–1)	Slovakia	Icon Sports Center, Grand Forks; Attendance: 301

Game reference

Filip Gustavsson
Goalies
Roman Durný
Referees:
(Czech Republic) Jan Hribik
(United States) Brett Sheva
Linesmen:
(Czech Republic) Libor Suchanek
(Russia) Alexander Sysuev

	0–1	06:03 – Ružička
Brännström (Lindström) – 11:37	1–1
Lindström (Liljegren) (PP) – 15:24	2–1
Hugg (Jonsson Fjällby, Brännström) (PP) – 16:28	3–1
Bokvist (Thilander, Moverare) – 33:59	4–1
Jonsson Fjällby (Hugg) – 38:50	5–1
Bratt – 39:31	6–1
	6–2	44:28 – Zeleňak (Buček, Studenič) (PP)
Wahlgren (Pettersson, Andersson) (PP) – 49:00	7–2

12 min
Penalties
16 min
42
Shots
20

April 21, 2016; 19:30	United States	8–0 (0–0, 3–0, 5–0)	Czech Republic	Ralph Engelstad Arena, Grand Forks; Attendance: 2,381

Game reference

Jake Oettinger
Goalies
Josef Kořenář
Dominik Groh
Referees:
(Germany) Sirko Hunnius
(Canada) Jeff Ingram
Linesmen:
(Belarus) Dmitry Golyak
(Canada) Nathan Vanoosten

Mittelstadt (Brown) – 24:50	1–0
Frederic (Lockwood) – 25:51	2–0
Anderson (Bellows, Keller) (PP) – 35:35	3–0
Keller (Fox, Lindgren) – 40:36	4–0
McPhee (Pastujov, Fox) – 43:40	5–0
Pastujov (Walker, McPhee) – 43:53	6–0
Anderson (Keller) (SH) – 49:51	7–0
Lindgren (Pastujov) (PP) – 58:02	8–0

8 min
Penalties
16 min
38
Shots
15

==== Semifinals ====
April 23, 2016; 15:00	United States	2–4 (1–1, 0–0, 1–3)	Finland	Ralph Engelstad Arena, Grand Forks; Attendance: 2,931

Game reference

Joseph Woll
Goalies
Ukko-Pekka Luukkonen
Referees:
(Czech Republic) Jan Hribik
(Sweden) Marcus Linde
Linesmen:
(Sweden) Johannes Kack
(Canada) Nathan Vanoosten

Bellows (Fox, Keller) – 11:42	1–0
	1–1	15:50 – Vaakanainen (Jokiharju, Nurmi)
	1–2	55:11 – Räsänen (Jokiharju) (SH)
Yamamoto (Martin, Lindgren) (PP1) – 56:33	2–2
	2–3	59:23 – Räsänen (Vesalainen, Puljujärvi) (PP1)
	2–4	59:59 – Puljujärvi (Räsänen) (ENG)

31 min
Penalties
10 min
28
Shots
26

April 23, 2016; 19:00	Canada	5–6 (1–1, 1–2, 3–2) (OT 0–0) (SO: 0–1)	Sweden	Ralph Engelstad Arena, Grand Forks; Attendance: 3,073

Game reference

Evan Fitzpatrick
Goalies
Filip Gustavsson
Referees:
(United States) Brett Sheva
(United States) Cameron Voss
Linesmen:
(United Kingdom) Andrew Dalton
(Belarus) Dmitry Golyak

Laberge (Chychrun) (PP1) – 02:20	1–0
	1–1	16:35 – Wahlgren (Brannström, Bokvist)
	1–2	21:17 – Steen (Bratt, Moverare)
Quenneville (McLeod) – 28:11	2–2
	2–3	29:42 – Söderlund (Hugg, Jonsson Fjallby)
	2–4	47:50 – Andersson (Moverare, Nylander)
Chychrun (Jost) – 48:34	3–4
	3–5	52:28 – Pettersson (Nylander)
Bitten (Shaw, Chychrun) – 52:45	4–5
Kyrou (Katchouk, Hague) – 54:44	5–5

Jost (miss)
Bitten (miss)
Howden
Shootout
Andersson
(miss) Bratt
Lindström
8 min
Penalties
10 min
59
Shots
35

,

==== Bronze medal game ====
April 24, 2016; 15:00	United States	10–3 (6–1, 1–0, 3–2)	Canada	Ralph Engelstad Arena, Grand Forks; Attendance: 3,448

Game reference

Jake Oettinger
Goalies
Stuart Skinner
Evan Fitzpatrick
Referees:
(Czech Republic) Jan Hribik
(Sweden) Marcus Linde
Linesmen:
(Czech Republic) Libor Suchanek
(Russia) Alexander Sysuev

Anderson (Keller, Krys) (PP) – 04:40	1–0
Brown (Yamamoto, Mittelstadt) – 05:11	2–0
	2–1	06:31 – Bitten (Shaw, Phillips)
Bellows (Keller, Greenway) – 07:28	3–1
Brown (Mittelstadt, Yamamoto) – 11:10	4–1
Anderson (Keller, Greenway) (SH) – 14:11	5–1
Pastujov (Howdeshell, Lockwood) – 16:48	6–1
Yamamoto (Mittelstadt, Brown) (PP) – 21:27	7–1
Walker – 44:22	8–1
Luce (Hellickson, Frederic) (PP2) – 45:05	9–1
	9–2	47:06 – Hall (Shaw, Malenstyn)
	9–3	51:19 – Tippett (Malenstyn, Hall)
Lockwood (Hellickson, McPhee) – 58:59	10–3

20 min
Penalties
34 min
33
Shots
32

==== Final ====
April 24, 2016; 19:00	Sweden	1–6 (0–3, 1–1, 0–2)	Finland	Ralph Engelstad Arena, Grand Forks; Attendance: 3,543

Game reference

Filip Gustavsson
Filip Larsson
Goalies
Ukko-Pekka Luukkonen
Referees:
(United States) Brett Sheva
(United States) Cameron Voss
Linesmen:
(United Kingdom) Andrew Dalton
(Belarus) Dmitry Golyak

	0–1	01:15 – Tolvanen (Kotkansalo)
	0–2	15:28 – Somppi (Kuokkanen)
	0–3	16:19 – Tuulola (Välimäki, Räsänen)
	0–4	31:01 – Puljujärvi (Kuokkanen)
Andersson (Nylander) – 32:01	1–4
	1–5	45:14 – Puljujärvi (Kuokkanen, Kotkansalo)
	1–6	59:12 – Puljujärvi (Tolvanen)

51 min
Penalties
16 min
18
Shots
34

=== Scoring leaders ===
List shows the top ten skaters sorted by points, then goals.

Player	GP	G	A	Pts	+/−	PIM
(Canada) Tyson Jost	7	6	9	15	+7	2
(United States) Clayton Keller	7	4	10	14	+11	2
(United States) Kailer Yamamoto	7	7	6	13	+7	12
(United States) Logan Brown	7	3	9	12	+6	2
(Sweden) Alexander Nylander	7	3	8	11	+5	0
(United States) Joey Anderson	7	7	2	9	+12	2
(Finland) Eeli Tolvanen	7	7	2	9	+6	0
(Sweden) Lias Andersson	7	5	4	9	+3	8
(United States) Casey Mittelstadt	7	4	5	9	+6	2
(Finland) Aapeli Räsänen	7	3	6	9	+8	12

GP = Games played; G = Goals; A = Assists; Pts = Points; +/− = Plus–minus; PIM = Penalties In Minutes
Source: IIHF.com

=== Leading goaltenders ===
Only the top five goaltenders, based on save percentage, who have played 40% of their team's minutes are included in this list.

Player	TOI	SA	GA	GAA	Sv%	SO
(United States) Joseph Woll	179:31	75	4	1.34	94.67	1
(United States) Jake Oettinger	240:00	91	6	1.50	93.41	1
(Russia) Daniil Tarasov	227:48	101	8	2.11	92.08	1
(Finland) Ukko-Pekka Luukkonen	180:00	72	6	2.00	91.67	0
(Sweden) Filip Gustavsson	289:21	138	13	2.70	90.58	0

TOI = Time On Ice (minutes:seconds); SA = Shots against; GA = Goals against; GAA = Goals against average; Sv% = Save percentage; SO = Shutouts
Source: IIHF.com

=== Tournament awards ===
Most Valuable Player

- Forward: (United States) Clayton Keller

All-star team

- Goaltender: (Finland) Ukko-Pekka Luukkonen
- Defencemen: (United States) Adam Fox, (Canada) David Quenneville
- Forwards: (Canada) Tyson Jost, (Finland) Jesse Puljujärvi, (United States) Clayton Keller

IIHF best player awards

- Goaltender: (Sweden) Filip Gustavsson
- Defenceman: (United States) Adam Fox
- Forward: (Canada) Tyson Jost

=== Final standings ===
Rank	Team
1st place, gold medalist(s)	Finland
2nd place, silver medalist(s)	Sweden
3rd place, bronze medalist(s)	United States
4th	Canada
5th	Slovakia
6th	Russia
7th	Czech Republic
8th	Switzerland
9th	Latvia
10th	Denmark

Relegated to the 2017 Division I A

== Division I ==
=== Division I A ===
The Division I A tournament was played in Minsk, Belarus, from April 9 to 15, 2016.

Pos	Team	Pld	W	OTW	OTL	L	GF	GA	GD	Pts	Promotion or relegation
1	Belarus	5	4	0	0	1	23	15	+8	12	Promoted to the 2017 Top Division
2	Germany	5	3	1	0	1	20	14	+6	11	
3	Kazakhstan	5	2	1	1	1	17	16	+1	9	
4	France	5	2	0	0	3	18	18	0	6	
5	Norway	5	1	0	1	3	16	22	−6	4	
6	Austria	5	1	0	0	4	11	20	−9	3	Relegated to the 2017 Division I B

Source: IIHF
Rules for classification: 1) points; 2) head-to-head points; 3) head-to-head goal difference; 4) head-to-head number of goals scored; 5) result against closest best-ranked team outside tied teams; 6) result against second-best-ranked team outside tied teams; 7) seeding before tournament.

=== Division I B ===
The Division I B tournament was played in Asiago, Italy, from April 18 to 24, 2016.

Pos	Team	Pld	W	OTW	OTL	L	GF	GA	GD	Pts	Promotion or relegation
1	Hungary	5	5	0	0	0	28	11	+17	15	Promoted to the 2017 Division I A
2	Japan	5	4	0	0	1	13	9	+4	12	
3	Ukraine	5	3	0	0	2	17	15	+2	9	
4	Slovenia	5	2	0	0	3	19	17	+2	6	
5	Italy	5	1	0	0	4	12	20	−8	3	
6	South Korea	5	0	0	0	5	10	27	−17	0	Relegated to the 2017 Division II A

Source: IIHF
Rules for classification: 1) points; 2) head-to-head points; 3) head-to-head goal difference; 4) head-to-head number of goals scored; 5) result against closest best-ranked team outside tied teams; 6) result against second-best-ranked team outside tied teams; 7) seeding before tournament.

== Division II ==
=== Division II A ===
The Division II A tournament was played in Brașov, Romania, from April 4 to 10, 2016.

Pos	Team	Pld	W	OTW	OTL	L	GF	GA	GD	Pts	Promotion or relegation
1	Poland	5	5	0	0	0	43	8	+35	15	Promoted to the 2017 Division I B
2	Romania	5	4	0	0	1	27	15	+12	12	
3	Lithuania	5	3	0	0	2	17	19	−2	9	
4	Great Britain	5	2	0	0	3	18	23	−5	6	
5	Croatia	5	1	0	0	4	8	25	−17	3	
6	Netherlands	5	0	0	0	5	6	29	−23	0	Relegated to the 2017 Division II B

Source: IIHF

=== Division II B ===
The Division II B tournament was played in Valdemoro, Spain, from March 26 to April 1, 2016.

Pos	Team	Pld	W	OTW	OTL	L	GF	GA	GD	Pts	Promotion or relegation
1	Estonia	5	5	0	0	0	38	11	+27	15	Promoted to the 2017 Division II A
2	Spain	5	4	0	0	1	26	14	+12	12	
3	Serbia	5	3	0	0	2	12	10	+2	9	
4	Iceland	5	1	0	0	4	11	30	−19	3	
5	Belgium	5	1	0	0	4	15	29	−14	3	
6	China	5	1	0	0	4	12	20	−8	3	Relegated to the 2017 Division III A

Source: IIHF

== Division III ==
=== Division III A ===
The Division III A tournament was played in Sofia, Bulgaria, from March 14 to 20, 2016.

Pos	Team	Pld	W	OTW	OTL	L	GF	GA	GD	Pts	Promotion or relegation
1	Australia	5	4	0	0	1	25	22	+3	12	Promoted to the 2017 Division II B
2	Turkey	5	3	1	0	1	22	13	+9	11	
3	Bulgaria	5	3	0	0	2	20	13	+7	9	
4	Israel	5	2	1	0	2	15	15	0	8	
5	Chinese Taipei	5	1	0	2	2	17	26	−9	5	
6	Mexico	5	0	0	0	5	10	20	−10	0	Relegated to the 2017 Division III B

Source: IIHF

=== Division III B ===
The Division III B tournament was played in Cape Town, South Africa, from February 14 to 19, 2016.

Pos	Team	Pld	W	OTW	OTL	L	GF	GA	GD	Pts	Promotion or relegation
1	New Zealand	4	4	0	0	0	30	9	+21	12	Promoted to the 2017 Division II A
2	South Africa	4	1	0	0	3	11	19	−8	3	
3	Hong Kong	4	1	0	0	3	12	25	−13	3	

Source: IIHF
