= Linus Lindström =

Swedish professional ice hockey player (born 1998)

- Born: 8 January 1998 (age 28) Skellefteå, Sweden
- Height: 6 ft 0 in (183 cm)
- Weight: 165 lb (75 kg; 11 st 11 lb)
- Position: Centre
- Shoots: Left
- SHL team: Skellefteå AIK
- NHL draft: 96th overall, 2016; Calgary Flames
- Playing career: 2016–present

Linus Lindström (born 8 January 1998) is a Swedish professional ice hockey player who is currently playing with Skellefteå AIK of the Swedish Hockey League (SHL). He was selected by the Calgary Flames in the fourth round, 96th overall, of the 2016 NHL entry draft.

== Playing career ==
Lindström made his Swedish Hockey League debut playing with Skellefteå AIK during the 2015–16 SHL season, on 23 February 2016.

During the 2018–19 season, Lindström appeared in 32 games with Skellefteå AIK before he was loaned to HockeyAllsvenskan club, BIK Karlskoga, on 25 January 2019. In the 2023–24 season, Lindström became SHL-Champion with Skellefteå AIK, helping the team to their first title since 2014.

== Career statistics ==
=== Regular season and playoffs ===
			Regular season					Playoffs
Season	Team	League	GP	G	A	Pts	PIM	GP	G	A	Pts	PIM
2014–15	Skellefteå AIK	J20	23	11	7	18	4	—	—	—	—	—
2015–16	Skellefteå AIK	J20	40	14	30	44	28	6	5	5	10	0
2015–16	Skellefteå AIK	SHL	4	1	0	1	0	—	—	—	—	—
2016–17	Skellefteå AIK	J20	6	4	4	8	2	2	0	1	1	0
2016–17	Skellefteå AIK	SHL	50	2	4	6	8	—	—	—	—	—
2017–18	Skellefteå AIK	SHL	41	3	1	4	14	16	0	4	4	4
2018–19	Skellefteå AIK	SHL	44	3	3	6	16	6	0	0	0	4
2018–19	BIK Karlskoga	Allsv	5	0	2	2	0	—	—	—	—	—
2019–20	Skellefteå AIK	SHL	48	7	13	20	12	—	—	—	—	—
2020–21	Skellefteå AIK	SHL	50	3	7	10	0	12	1	1	2	2
2021–22	Skellefteå AIK	SHL	51	14	13	27	22	6	0	1	1	2
2022–23	Skellefteå AIK	SHL	41	5	5	10	12	17	1	4	5	4
2023–24	Skellefteå AIK	SHL	52	13	12	25	24	16	5	3	8	14
SHL totals			381	51	58	109	108	73	7	13	20	30

Medal record

Representing Sweden

Ice hockey

World Junior Championships
Silver medal – second place	2018 United States	

World U18 Championships
Silver medal – second place	2016 United States	

=== International ===
Year	Team	Event	Result	GP	G	A	Pts	PIM
2014	Sweden	U17	3rd place, bronze medalist(s)	6	1	3	4	2
2015	Sweden	IH18	2nd place, silver medalist(s)	5	0	1	1	4
2015	Sweden	U18	8th	5	1	0	1	0
2016	Sweden	U18	2nd place, silver medalist(s)	7	1	3	4	6
2018	Sweden	WJC	2nd place, silver medalist(s)	7	0	3	3	8
Junior totals				30	3	10	13	20

== Awards and honors ==
Award	Year
SHL
Le Mat Trophy	2024
