= Jacob Moverare =

Swedish ice hockey player (born 1998)

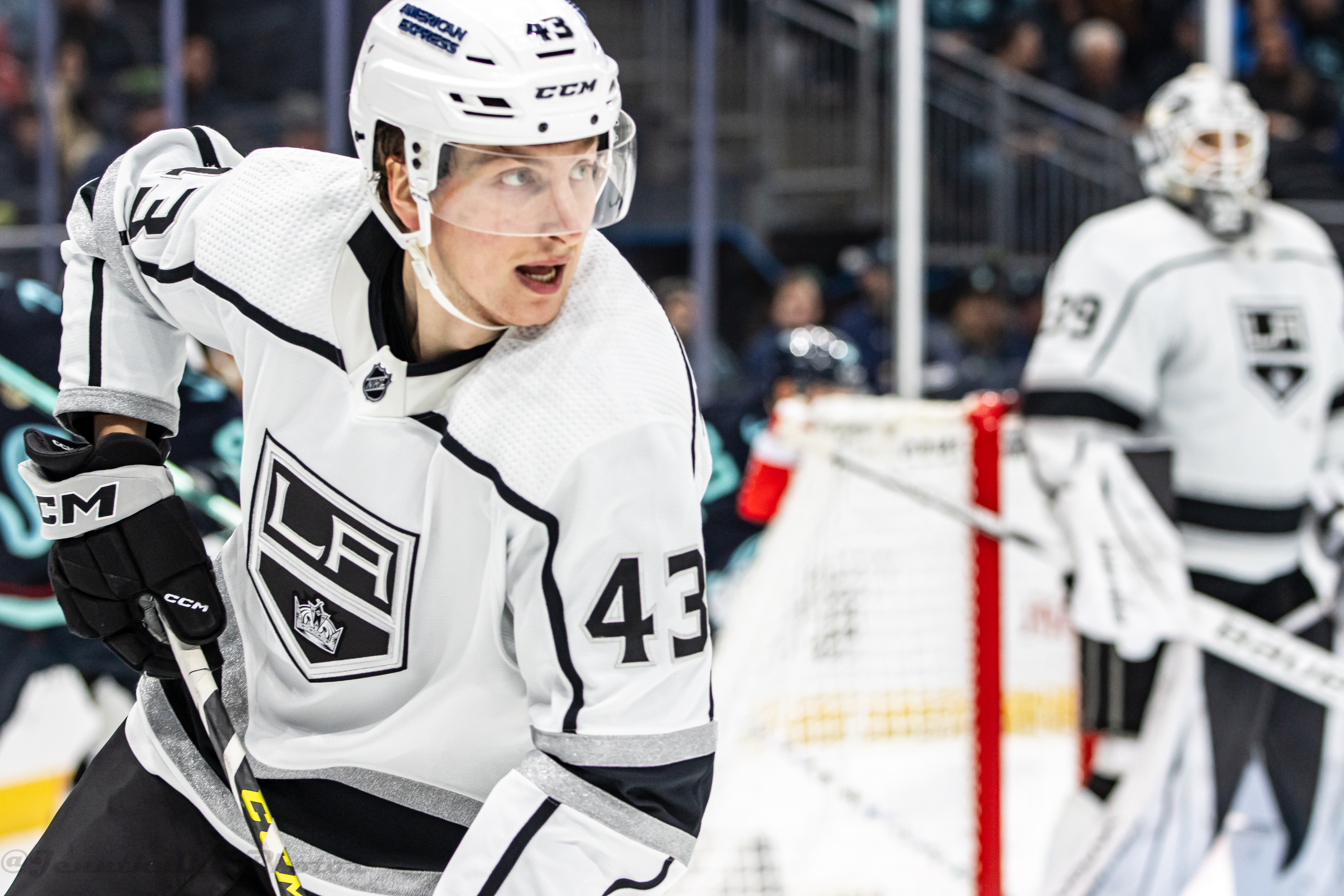
- Moverare with the Los Angeles Kings in 2023
- Born: August 31, 1998 (age 27) Östersund, Sweden
- Height: 6 ft 2 in (188 cm)
- Weight: 198 lb (90 kg; 14 st 2 lb)
- Position: Defence
- Shoots: Left
- NL team Former teams: EV Zug; HV71; Frölunda HC; SaiPa; Los Angeles Kings
- NHL draft: 112th overall, 2016; Los Angeles Kings
- Playing career: 2015–present

Jacob Moverare (born August 31, 1998) is a Swedish professional ice hockey defenceman who is currently playing with EV Zug in the National League (NL). He was selected by the Los Angeles Kings in the fourth round, 112th overall, in the 2016 NHL entry draft.

== Playing career ==
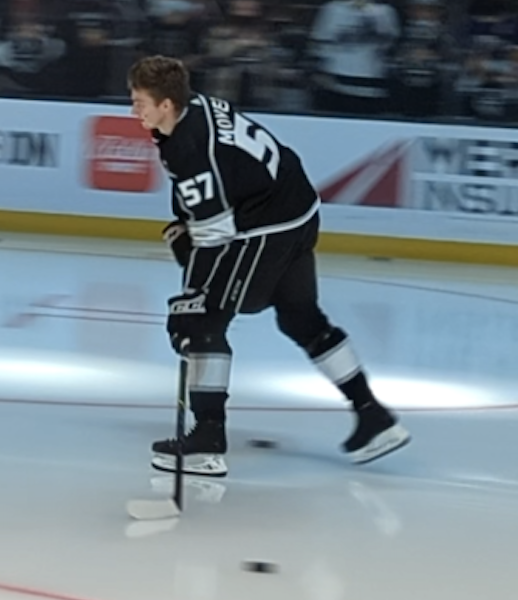
Moverare during his NHL debut.

Moverare made his Swedish Hockey League debut with HV71 during the 2015–16 SHL season, going scoreless in 4 games. He was promoted to the SHL after posting 21 points in 41 games from the blueline for HV71 at the J20 SuperElit level.

On June 25, 2016, Moverare was selected 112th overall by the Los Angeles Kings in the 2016 NHL entry draft. He was soon signed to a three-year, entry-level contract with the Kings on July 15. Signalling his intentions to continue his development in North America, Moverare was selected 20th overall in the 2016 CHL Import Draft by the Mississauga Steelheads of the Ontario Hockey League (OHL), agreeing to terms on August 9.

Following two seasons of major junior ice hockey with the Steelheads, Moverare embarking on his first full professional season attended the Kings' 2018 training camp. On September 23, 2018, Moverare was cut from the roster and initially reassigned to join the training camp of American Hockey League (AHL) affiliate, the Ontario Reign. With a surplus of defenceman within the Kings organization and with the interest of guaranteed icetime, Moverare was loaned by the Kings back to the SHL, to continue his development. Opting to not return to HV71, Moverare secured a season long agreement with Frölunda HC for the 2018–19 season on September 24, 2018.

On March 6, 2024, Moverare signed a two-year contract extension with the Kings.

Having appeared in 109 career NHL games with the Kings following the 2025–26 season, Moverare left as a free agent after six years within the organization and returned to Europe in agreeing to two-year contract with Swiss club, EV Zug of the NL, on 28 July 2026.

== Career statistics ==
=== Regular season and playoffs ===
			Regular season					Playoffs
Season	Team	League	GP	G	A	Pts	PIM	GP	G	A	Pts	PIM
2014–15	HV71	J20	42	1	9	10	6	6	0	0	0	2
2015–16	HV71	J20	41	5	16	21	22	3	0	1	1	4
2015–16	HV71	SHL	4	0	0	0	0	—	—	—	—	—
2016–17	Mississauga Steelheads	OHL	63	2	30	32	20	20	2	5	7	10
2017–18	Mississauga Steelheads	OHL	32	3	18	21	8	—	—	—	—	—
2018–19	Frölunda HC	SHL	42	4	3	7	10	16	3	3	6	4
2019–20	Frölunda HC	SHL	51	7	12	19	14	—	—	—	—	—
2020–21	SaiPa	Liiga	11	0	5	5	29	—	—	—	—	—
2020–21	Ontario Reign	AHL	26	1	14	15	0	1	0	0	0	0
2021–22	Ontario Reign	AHL	30	3	7	10	8	—	—	—	—	—
2021–22	Los Angeles Kings	NHL	19	0	2	2	2	—	—	—	—	—
2022–23	Ontario Reign	AHL	62	4	22	26	37	2	0	1	1	0
2022–23	Los Angeles Kings	NHL	2	0	0	0	0	—	—	—	—	—
2023–24	Ontario Reign	AHL	34	2	16	18	12	—	—	—	—	—
2023–24	Los Angeles Kings	NHL	24	1	0	1	6	—	—	—	—	—
2024–25	Ontario Reign	AHL	11	0	2	2	4	—	—	—	—	—
2024–25	Los Angeles Kings	NHL	49	1	7	8	10	2	0	0	0	0
2025–26	Los Angeles Kings	NHL	15	0	0	0	0	—	—	—	—	—
SHL totals			97	11	15	26	24	16	3	3	6	4
NHL totals			109	2	9	11	18	2	0	0	0	0

Medal record

Representing Sweden

Ice hockey

World Junior Championships
Silver medal – second place	2018 United States	

World U18 Championships
Silver medal – second place	2016 United States	

=== International ===
Year	Team	Event	Result	GP	G	A	Pts	PIM
2014	Sweden	U17	3rd place, bronze medalist(s)	6	0	3	3	6
2015	Sweden	IH18	2nd place, silver medalist(s)	3	0	0	0	0
2016	Sweden	U18	2nd place, silver medalist(s)	7	1	4	5	0
2018	Sweden	WJC	2nd place, silver medalist(s)	7	0	0	0	0
Junior totals				23	1	7	8	6

== Awards and honours ==
Award	Year	Ref
CHL
Champion	2019	
SHL
Le Mat Trophy champion	2019	
