= William Bitten =

Canadian ice hockey player (born 1998)

Will Bitten
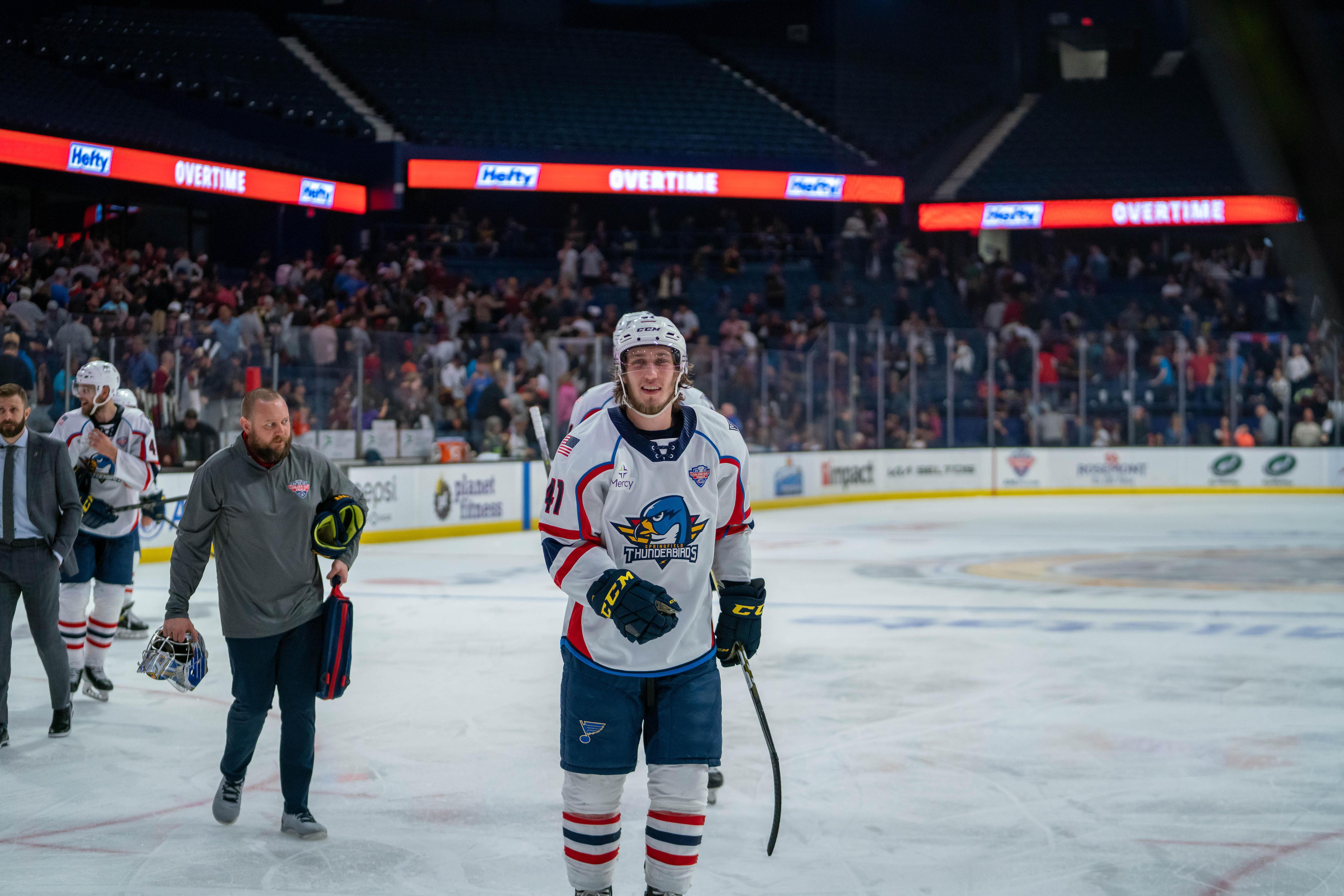
- Born: July 10, 1998 (age 28) Ottawa, Ontario, Canada
- Height: 5 ft 11 in (180 cm)
- Weight: 180 lb (82 kg; 12 st 12 lb)
- Position: Center/Right wing
- Shoots: Right
- AHL team Former teams: Charlotte Checkers; St. Louis Blues; Spartak Moscow; HC Sochi
- NHL draft: 70th overall, 2016; Montreal Canadiens
- Playing career: 2018–present

William Bitten (born July 10, 1998) is a Canadian professional ice hockey forward who is currently playing with the Charlotte Checkers of the American Hockey League (AHL). He was selected by the Montreal Canadiens in the third-round, 70th overall, of the 2016 NHL entry draft.

== Personal life ==
William Bitten was born to Michael Bitten and Doris Piché, Olympic badminton players. He grew up playing hockey and badminton, and he attended the French-language high school École secondaire catholique Franco-Cité. He has a younger brother, Sam Bitten, who is also a hockey player.

== Playing career ==
Bitten played major junior hockey with the Plymouth Whalers, Flint Firebirds, and the Hamilton Bulldogs in the Ontario Hockey League (OHL) from 2014–2018. During his tenure in the OHL, he was selected in the third-round, 70th overall, of the 2016 NHL entry draft by the Montreal Canadiens.

During his final junior season with the Bulldogs, Bitten was signed to a three-year, entry-level contract with the Montreal Canadiens on March 7, 2018.

After attending training camp with Montreal in approach to his first professional season, Bitten was traded by the Canadiens to the Minnesota Wild in exchange for Gustav Olofsson on October 3, 2018. He was assigned to begin the 2018–19 season with the Wild's AHL affiliate, the Iowa Wild.

Remaining in the AHL for the duration of his entry-level contract, Bitten was re-signed by the Wild to a one-year, two-way contract extension on August 9, 2021. Continuing in his fourth season within the Wild organization in 2021–22, Bitten collected 3 goals and 8 points through 23 games before he was traded by the Wild to the St. Louis Blues in exchange for Nolan Stevens on December 29, 2021. Bitten immediately responded to the change of scenery, increasing his offensive totals in posting 10 goals and 25 points through 45 regular season games. In the post-season, Bitten led the Thunderbirds in scoring in propelling the club to the Calder Cup finals, collecting 8 goals and 21 points in just 18 games.

As a restricted free agent, Bitten was re-signed by the Blues to a two-year, two-way contract extension on July 13, 2022. He was returned to the Thunderbirds to begin the 2022–23 season, before he received his first recall to the Blues on December 3, 2022. He made his NHL debut with the Blues that night, skating on the fourth-line, in a 6-2 defeat to the Pittsburgh Penguins. He registered his first point, an assist, in his next appearance, helping the Blues to a 7-4 victory over the New York Islanders on December 6, 2022.

As an unrestricted free agent from the Blues, in the 2024 offseason, Bitten signed his first contract abroad after agreeing to a one-year deal with Russian based Spartak Moscow of the Kontinental Hockey League (KHL), on August 7, 2024.

After two seasons in the KHL, finishing his tenure with HC Sochi in the 2025–26 season, Bitten opted to return to North America as a free agent, signing a one-year AHL contract with the Charlotte Checkers, affiliate to the Florida Panthers, on June 12, 2026.

== Career statistics ==
=== Regular season and playoffs ===
			Regular season					Playoffs
Season	Team	League	GP	G	A	Pts	PIM	GP	G	A	Pts	PIM
2013–14	Ottawa Jr. Senators	CCHL	1	0	1	1	0	—	—	—	—	—
2014–15	Plymouth Whalers	OHL	63	15	16	31	16	—	—	—	—	—
2015–16	Flint Firebirds	OHL	67	30	35	65	32	—	—	—	—	—
2016–17	Hamilton Bulldogs	OHL	65	23	34	57	36	7	3	0	3	8
2017–18	Hamilton Bulldogs	OHL	62	20	44	64	38	21	4	7	11	21
2018–19	Iowa Wild	AHL	63	13	16	29	20	11	0	5	5	2
2019–20	Iowa Wild	AHL	51	8	13	21	22	—	—	—	—	—
2020–21	Iowa Wild	AHL	31	7	12	19	19	—	—	—	—	—
2021–22	Iowa Wild	AHL	23	3	5	8	6	—	—	—	—	—
2021–22	Springfield Thunderbirds	AHL	45	10	15	25	11	18	8	13	21	22
2022–23	Springfield Thunderbirds	AHL	65	22	23	45	36	2	1	0	1	2
2022–23	St. Louis Blues	NHL	4	0	1	1	0	—	—	—	—	—
2023–24	Springfield Thunderbirds	AHL	68	17	16	33	32	—	—	—	—	—
2024–25	Spartak Moscow	KHL	21	1	4	5	0	—	—	—	—	—
2024–25	HC Sochi	KHL	30	10	4	14	18	—	—	—	—	—
2025–26	HC Sochi	KHL	59	10	11	21	14	—	—	—	—	—
NHL totals			4	0	1	1	0	—	—	—	—	—
KHL totals			110	21	19	40	32	—	—	—	—	—

=== International ===
Year	Team	Event	Result	GP	G	A	Pts	PIM
2014	Canada Red	U17	6th	5	2	3	5	0
2015	Canada	IH18	1st place, gold medalist(s)	4	1	1	2	0
2016	Canada	U18	4th	7	3	5	8	2
Junior totals				16	6	9	15	2

== Awards and honours ==
Award	Year
OHL
CHL/NHL Top Prospects Game	2016
