= Will Lockwood (ice hockey) =

American ice hockey player

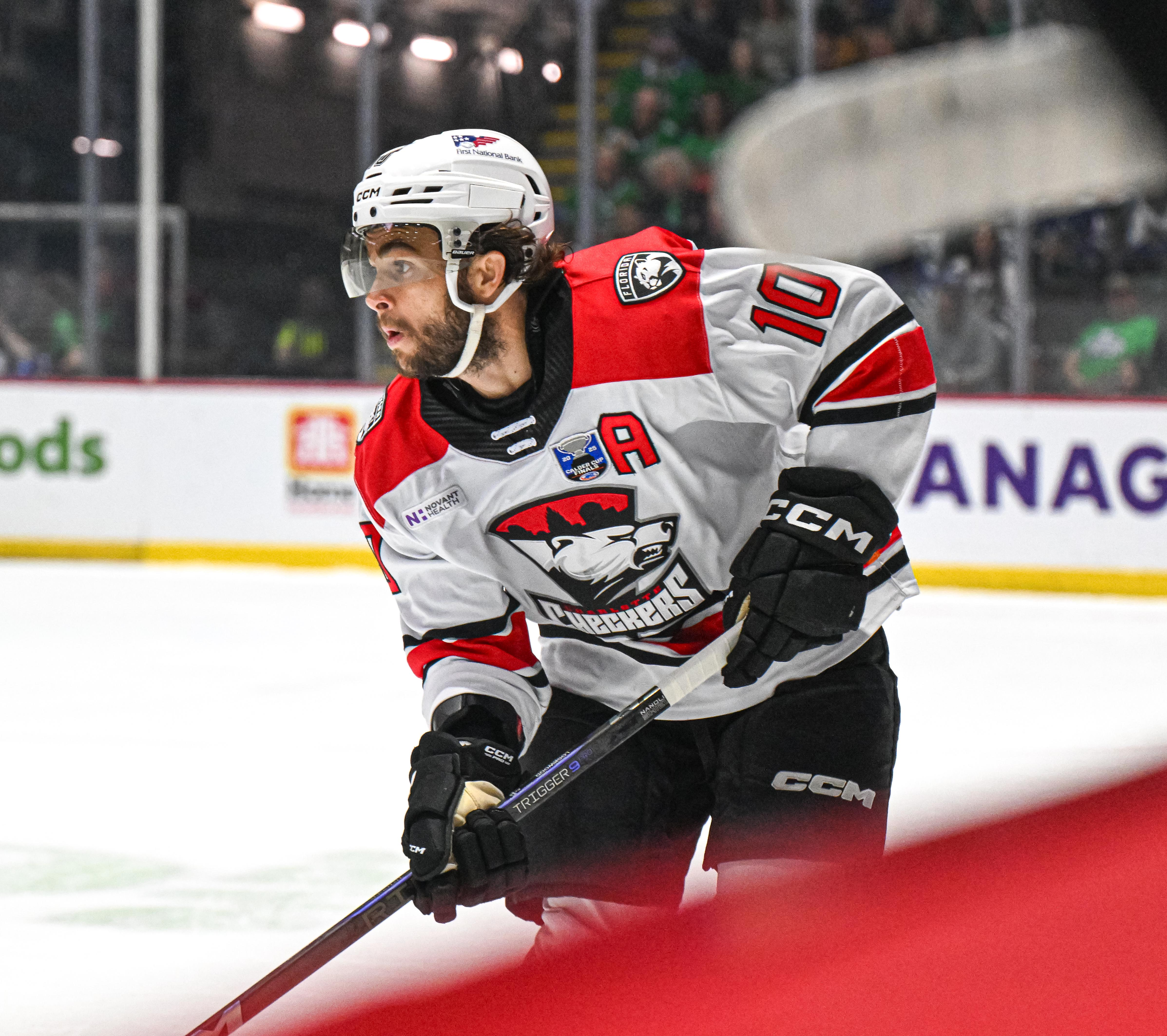
- Lockwood with the Charlotte Checkers in 2025.
- Born: June 20, 1998 (age 28) Bloomfield Hills, Michigan, U.S.
- Height: 5 ft 11 in (180 cm)
- Weight: 172 lb (78 kg; 12 st 4 lb)
- Position: Right wing
- Shoots: Right
- NHL team Former teams: Free agent Vancouver Canucks; Florida Panthers
- NHL draft: 64th overall, 2016; Vancouver Canucks
- Playing career: 2021–present

William Lockwood (born June 20, 1998) is an American professional ice hockey right winger who is currently an unrestricted free agent. He most recently played for the Charlotte Checkers of the American Hockey League (AHL) as a prospect to the Florida Panthers of the National Hockey League (NHL). He played college ice hockey for the University of Michigan. Lockwood was selected by the Vancouver Canucks in the third round, 64th overall, in the 2016 NHL entry draft.

== Playing career ==
While playing for the US National Team Development Program during the 2015–16 season, Lockwood recorded 16 goals and 39 points in 79 games before he was drafted by the Vancouver Canucks in the NHL Entry Draft. He then played for the University of Michigan, where he earned the Hal Downes Trophy as the team's MVP and Dekers Club Award as the team's top rookie in his freshman year. During the 2019–20 season in his senior year, Lockwood served as team captain where he ranked second on the team in scoring, recording nine goals and 14 assists in 33 games.

Lockwood was selected 64th overall in the third round of the 2016 NHL entry draft by the Vancouver Canucks. He was selected higher than projected, with NHL Central Scouting ranking him 108th among North American skaters. On March 19, 2020, Lockwood signed an entry-level contract with the Canucks.

On February 25, 2023, Lockwood and a seventh-round pick in the 2026 draft were traded to the New York Rangers in exchange for Vitali Kravtsov.

Leaving the Rangers as a free agent at the conclusion of the season, Lockwood was signed to a two-year, two-way contract with the Florida Panthers on July 2, 2023.

== International play ==
Medal record

Representing United States

Ice hockey

World Junior Championships
Bronze medal – third place	2018 United States	

World U18 Championships
Bronze medal – third place	2016 United States	

Lockwood helped the United States national under-18 team capture bronze at the 2016 IIHF World U18 Championships.

Lockwood was selected to the United States under-20 team for the 2018 World Junior Championships in Buffalo, New York, winning bronze. However, during the tournament he was injured and was projected to miss months to recover.

== Career statistics ==
=== Regular season and playoffs ===
			Regular season					Playoffs
Season	Team	League	GP	G	A	Pts	PIM	GP	G	A	Pts	PIM
2014–15	U.S. National Development Team	USHL	35	8	5	13	10	—	—	—	—	—
2015–16	U.S. National Development Team	USHL	20	3	3	6	27	—	—	—	—	—
2016–17	University of Michigan	B1G	30	8	12	20	33	—	—	—	—	—
2017–18	University of Michigan	B1G	16	4	7	11	11	—	—	—	—	—
2018–19	University of Michigan	B1G	36	16	15	31	24	—	—	—	—	—
2019–20	University of Michigan	B1G	33	9	14	23	18	—	—	—	—	—
2020–21	Vancouver Canucks	NHL	2	0	0	0	2	—	—	—	—	—
2020–21	Utica Comets	AHL	24	4	7	11	17	—	—	—	—	—
2021–22	Vancouver Canucks	NHL	13	0	0	0	9	—	—	—	—	—
2021–22	Abbotsford Canucks	AHL	46	9	16	25	38	—	—	—	—	—
2022–23	Vancouver Canucks	NHL	13	0	1	1	0	—	—	—	—	—
2022–23	Abbotsford Canucks	AHL	26	12	6	18	16	—	—	—	—	—
2022–23	Hartford Wolf Pack	AHL	17	5	7	12	6	9	0	3	3	23
2023–24	Charlotte Checkers	AHL	32	12	12	24	10	3	1	1	2	0
2023–24	Florida Panthers	NHL	26	0	1	1	16	—	—	—	—	—
2024–25	Charlotte Checkers	AHL	52	10	11	21	18	18	5	2	7	6
NHL totals			54	0	2	2	27	—	—	—	—	—

=== International ===
Year	Team	Event	Result	GP	G	A	Pts	PIM
2014	United States	U17	2nd place, silver medalist(s)	6	2	1	3	0
2016	United States	U18	3rd place, bronze medalist(s)	7	1	6	7	0
2018	United States	WJC	3rd place, bronze medalist(s)	3	0	0	0	2
Junior totals				16	3	7	10	2
