= Kailer Yamamoto =

American ice hockey player (born 1998)

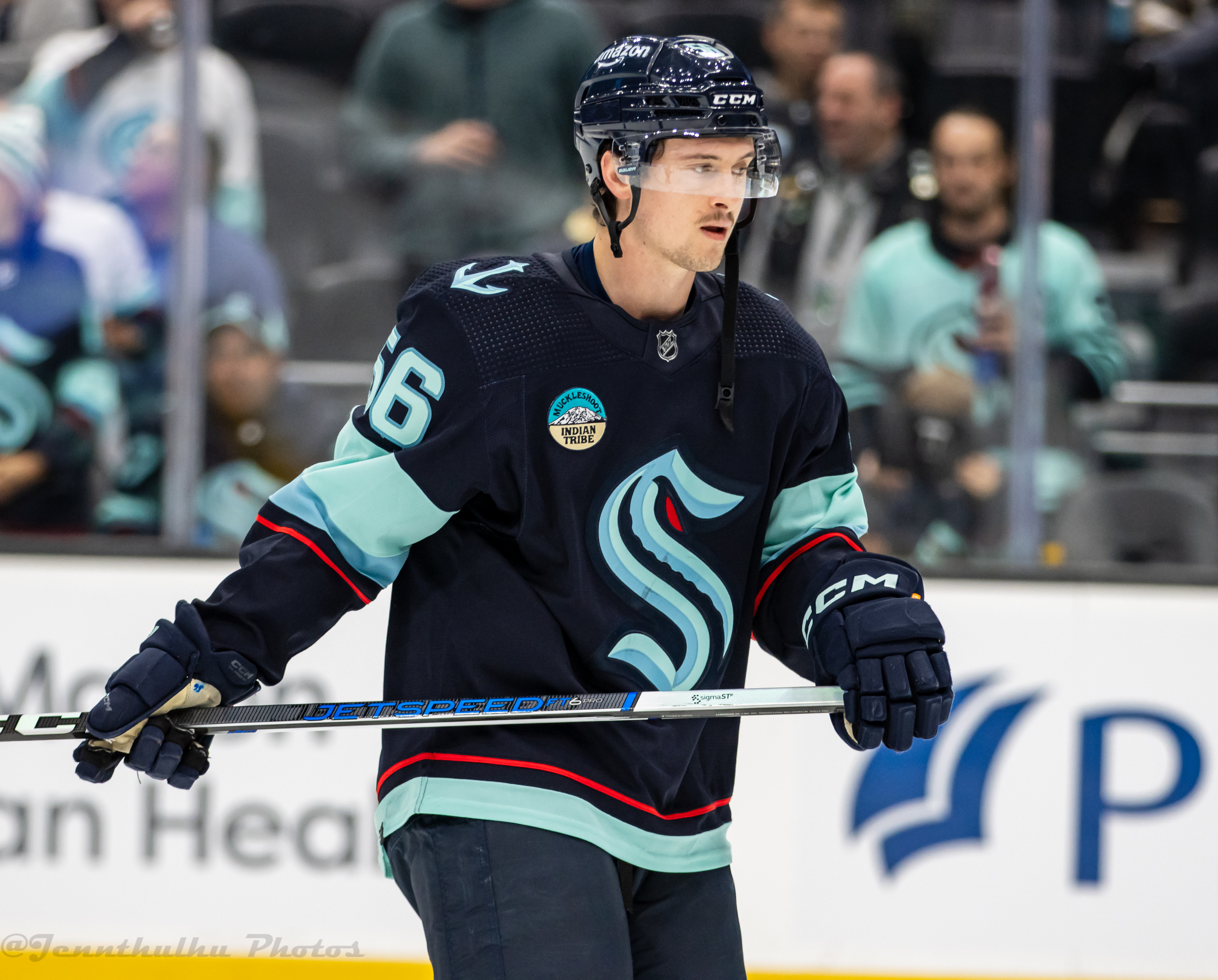
- Yamamoto with the Seattle Kraken in 2023
- Born: September 29, 1998 (age 28) Spokane, Washington, U.S.
- Height: 5 ft 8 in (173 cm)
- Weight: 178 lb (81 kg; 12 st 10 lb)
- Position: Right wing
- Shoots: Right
- NHL team Former teams: Utah Mammoth; Edmonton Oilers; Seattle Kraken
- NHL draft: 22nd overall, 2017; Edmonton Oilers
- Playing career: 2017–present

Kailer Yamamoto (born September 29, 1998) is an American professional ice hockey player who is a right winger for the Utah Mammoth of the National Hockey League (NHL). He was selected in the first round, 22nd overall, by the Edmonton Oilers in the 2017 NHL entry draft.

== Playing career ==
=== Junior ===
Yamamoto played in the 2011 Quebec International Pee-Wee Hockey Tournament with the Los Angeles Selects minor ice hockey team. He later played for the Los Angeles Jr. Kings of the Tier 1 Elite Hockey League. Yamamoto had racked up 40 points in only 34 games. He would then go on to play in the Western Hockey League.

Yamamoto was selected in the fifth round, 105th overall in the 2013 WHL bantam draft by his hometown team, the Spokane Chiefs. In his rookie season with the Chiefs, in 2014–15, he posted 23 goals and 57 points in 68 games. He was a top scorer at the 2015 Ivan Hlinka Memorial Tournament for Team USA.

Yamamoto was one of three WHL players invited to participate in the 2016 CCM/USA Hockey All-American Prospects Game. During the 2016–17 season, Yamamoto was named WHL Player of the Week week ending October 30, 2016, for registering seven points in four games. He was named to the 2016–17 Western Conference Second All-Star Team after ranking 6th overall in scoring with 42 goals and 57 assists for 99 points.

=== Professional ===
On June 23, 2017, Yamamoto was drafted in the first round, 22nd overall, in the 2017 NHL entry draft by the Edmonton Oilers. At the time, he drew comparisons to the Calgary Flames' Johnny Gaudreau (drafted 2011), particularly due to their small size and playing style.

After an impressive training camp with the Oilers, Yamamoto made the opening night roster for the 2017–18 season. He made his regular-season debut on October 4, 2017, against the Calgary Flames in a 3–0 win, and recorded his first career point, an assist, on October 14 on an Adam Larsson goal against the Ottawa Senators. After playing his ninth game with the Oilers and recording 3 assists, Yamamoto was returned to Spokane to continue his development at the major junior level on November 6, 2017.

The Oilers included Yamamoto on their 25-player roster at the start of the 2018–19 season. He recorded his first NHL goal on October 18, in a 3–2 overtime win over the Boston Bruins.

As a restricted free agent following the 2021–22 season, Yamamoto avoided arbitration with the Oilers after re-signing to a two-year, $3.1 million per year contract extension on August 4, 2022.

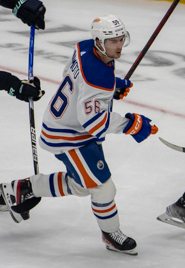
Yamamoto with the Oilers during a 2022 preseason game.

After being sent back to Edmonton for injury reevaluation on November 10, 2022 while the team was on a road trip, Yamamoto remained out with an undisclosed injury, missing 7 games. Yamamoto was placed on injured reserve on November 27. He was activated off injured reserve on December 5. and scored his first goal of the 2022–23 season on December 9, in a game against the Minnesota Wild. Yamamoto was again placed on [long-term] injured reserve on January 17, 2023. He returned to play in a regular-season game against the New York Rangers on February 17. In the 15 games he played in upon his return from LTIR, he tallied 5 goals and 1 assist in a combined total of 249:49 of ice-time. On March 3, he scored the fastest 2 goals (40 seconds apart) by an Oilers player since Taylor Hall in October 2013.

On April 29, Yamamoto scored the series-clinching goal late in the third period of Game 6 of the Oilers' first-round series against the Los Angeles Kings.

On June 29, Yamamoto was traded to the Detroit Red Wings, along with Klim Kostin, in exchange for future considerations. A day later, he was placed on unconditional waivers by the Red Wings for the purposes of a buy out.

On July 2, Yamamoto signed as a free agent to a one-year, $1.5 million deal with the Seattle Kraken. In the 2023–24 season, Yamamoto made 59 regular season appearances with the Kraken, however was unable to replicate his previous offensive levels, contributing with a career low 16 points.

As an un-signed free agent over the summer, Yamamoto accepted an invitation to attend the Utah Mammoth training camp for the 2024–25 season on a professional tryout on September 12, 2024. Following a successful preseason, with three goals in four games, Yamamoto signed a one-year contract with Utah on October 6, 2024.

While playing for the Utah Mammoth's AHL affiliate team, the Tucson Roadrunners, Yamamoto was suspended for the March 8 game against the Bakersfield Condors, as a result of a spearing incident on March 7th.

== International play ==
At the 2016 IIHF U18 World Championship in Grand Forks, North Dakota, Yamamoto scored 13 points in 7 games, including 7 goals, helping Team USA win bronze.

Yamamoto was selected to the Team America's under-20 team for the 2018 World Junior Championships in Buffalo, New York, winning bronze.

== Personal life ==
Through his paternal grandfather, Yamamoto is of Japanese descent. Yamamoto and his older brother, Keanu, were taught to skate by Tyler Johnson's mother and would later train with Johnson in his offseason. He is a native of Spokane, Washington. On August 10th, 2025, Yamamoto married his longtime girlfriend, Bailey Williams. Yamamoto and Williams have been in a relationship since 2016.

== Career statistics ==
=== Regular season and playoffs ===
			Regular season					Playoffs
Season	Team	League	GP	G	A	Pts	PIM	GP	G	A	Pts	PIM
2013–14	Los Angeles Jr. Kings	T1EHL	34	17	23	40	14	—	—	—	—	—
2014–15	Spokane Chiefs	WHL	68	23	34	57	50	6	2	3	5	6
2015–16	Spokane Chiefs	WHL	57	19	52	71	34	6	1	4	5	10
2016–17	Spokane Chiefs	WHL	65	42	57	99	46	—	—	—	—	—
2017–18	Edmonton Oilers	NHL	9	0	3	3	2	—	—	—	—	—
2017–18	Spokane Chiefs	WHL	40	21	43	64	18	7	1	3	4	6
2018–19	Edmonton Oilers	NHL	17	1	1	2	2	—	—	—	—	—
2018–19	Bakersfield Condors	AHL	27	10	8	18	16	—	—	—	—	—
2019–20	Bakersfield Condors	AHL	23	8	8	16	16	—	—	—	—	—
2019–20	Edmonton Oilers	NHL	27	11	15	26	12	4	0	0	0	6
2020–21	Edmonton Oilers	NHL	52	8	13	21	26	4	0	1	1	2
2021–22	Edmonton Oilers	NHL	81	20	21	41	40	14	2	5	7	10
2022–23	Edmonton Oilers	NHL	58	10	15	25	24	12	1	3	4	18
2023–24	Seattle Kraken	NHL	59	8	8	16	18	—	—	—	—	—
2024–25	Utah Hockey Club	NHL	12	2	1	3	2	—	—	—	—	—
2024–25	Tucson Roadrunners	AHL	54	20	36	56	41	3	1	0	1	10
2025–26	Utah Mammoth	NHL	59	13	10	23	14	6	1	4	5	2
NHL totals			374	73	87	160	140	40	4	13	17	38

=== International ===
Year	Team	Event	Result	GP	G	A	Pts	PIM
2014	United States	U17	2nd place, silver medalist(s)	6	3	3	6	2
2015	United States	IH18	5th	4	4	3	7	14
2016	United States	U18	3rd place, bronze medalist(s)	7	7	6	13	12
2018	United States	WJC	3rd place, bronze medalist(s)	7	2	2	4	4
Junior totals				24	16	14	30	32

== Awards and honors ==
Award	Year
WHL
West Second All-Star Team	2017

Awards and achievements
Preceded by Jesse Puljujärvi	Edmonton Oilers first-round draft pick 2017	Succeeded by Evan Bouchard
