= Hellickson =

Hellickson is a surname. Notable people with the surname include:

- Jeremy Hellickson (born 1987), American baseball player
- Matt Hellickson (born 1998), American ice hockey player
- Russ Hellickson (born 1948), American sport wrestler
