= Marcus Davidsson =

Swedish ice hockey player (born 1998)

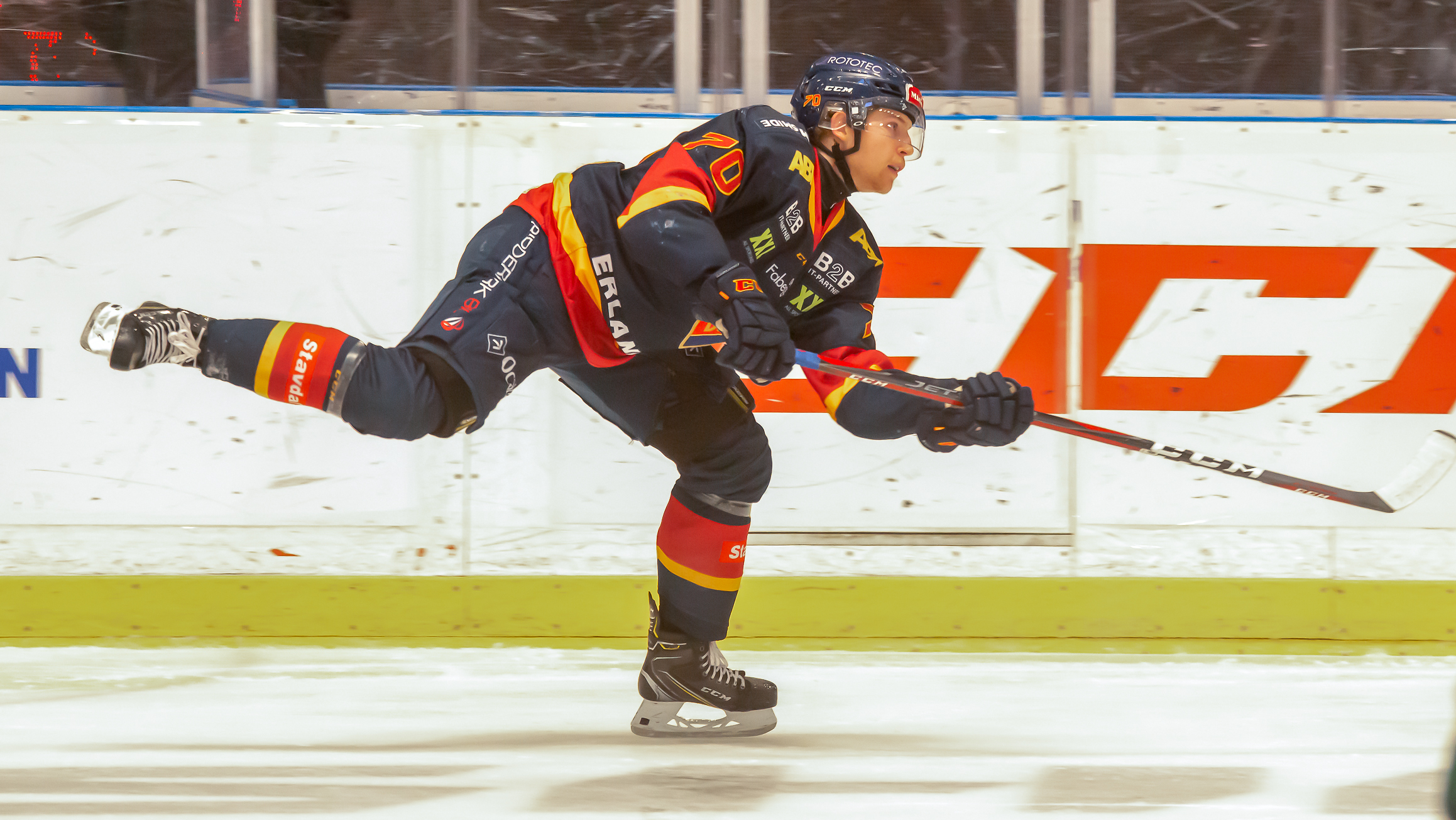
- Born: 18 November 1998 (age 27) Tyresö, Sweden
- Height: 6 ft 0 in (183 cm)
- Weight: 191 lb (87 kg; 13 st 9 lb)
- Position: Centre
- Shoots: Left
- Liiga team Former teams: Kouvola KooKoo; Porin Ässät; Djurgårdens IF; Växjö Lakers; HV71; Tappara
- NHL draft: 37th overall, 2017; Buffalo Sabres
- Playing career: 2016–present

Marcus Davidsson (born 18 November 1998) is a Swedish professional ice hockey player. He is currently playing with KooKoo of the Liiga. Davidsson was drafted in the second round, 37th overall, of the 2017 NHL entry draft by the Buffalo Sabres.

== Playing career ==
Davidsson began playing hockey in the local Tyresö club Tyresö HK. He joined the Djurgårdens IF under-16 team for the 2012–13 season to play minor hockey. Davidsson was promoted to the under-18 team for the following season, where he played the majority of the season, except for seven games in the under-16 team. He was selected to join the Stockholm South team in the national tournament for district teams, TV-pucken. In eight games, he scored one goal and two points. The 2014–15 season meant another season in the under-18 team, but when the season finished, Davidsson had made his debut for the J20 team, playing two games with the team.

Davidsson made his Swedish Hockey League debut playing with Djurgårdens IF against Färjestad BK on 8 March 2016 and also scored his first SHL goal during his first shift. Davidsson signed a two-year contract extension with Djurgården after the 2015–16 SHL season.

Following the conclusion of the 2018–19 season, helping Djurgårdens IF reach the SHL finals, Davidsson left to sign a two-year contract with fellow Swedish club, Växjö Lakers, on 7 May 2019. In his two-year tenure with Växjö, Davidsson appeared in 43 regular season games but was unable to cement a place within the team, ending his contract on loan in the Allsvenskan in stint with Västerviks IK and Södertälje SK.

After his contract with Växjö, Davidsson, as a free agent, opted to sign a one-year contract alongside his brother Jonathan to play with freshly relegated HockeyAllsvenskan club, HV71, on 22 June 2021.

After helping HV71 return to the SHL, Davidsson registered 3 points through 21 games in the 2022–23 season before he left the club, alongside Jonathan in signing for the remainder of the season with Tappara of the Finnish Liiga on 18 December 2022. Davidsson won the Liiga championship with Tappara.

== Personal ==
Marcus' older brother Jonathan was a former teammate and currently plays for the Ottawa Senators organization. Davidsson, along with his older brother, extended his contract with Djurgården for an additional season in February 2018.

== Career statistics ==
=== Regular season and playoffs ===
| | | | Regular season | | | | | Playoffs |
| Season | Team | League | GP | G | A | Pts | PIM | GP | G | A | Pts | PIM |
|---|---|---|---|---|---|---|---|---|---|---|---|---|
| 2014–15 | Djurgårdens IF | J20 | 2 | 0 | 0 | 0 | 0 | — | — | — | — | — |
| 2015–16 | Djurgårdens IF | J20 | 45 | 17 | 23 | 40 | 24 | 6 | 3 | 3 | 6 | 0 |
| 2015–16 | Djurgårdens IF | SHL | 1 | 1 | 0 | 1 | 0 | 1 | 0 | 0 | 0 | 0 |
| 2016–17 | Djurgårdens IF | J20 | 9 | 6 | 4 | 10 | 2 | 1 | 0 | 0 | 0 | 0 |
| 2016–17 | Djurgårdens IF | SHL | 45 | 5 | 4 | 9 | 6 | 3 | 0 | 0 | 0 | 2 |
| 2017–18 | Djurgårdens IF | J20 | 3 | 3 | 1 | 4 | 0 | — | — | — | — | — |
| 2017–18 | Djurgårdens IF | SHL | 39 | 9 | 12 | 21 | 14 | 11 | 0 | 5 | 5 | 4 |
| 2018–19 | Djurgårdens IF | SHL | 52 | 10 | 17 | 27 | 16 | 19 | 3 | 3 | 6 | 16 |
| 2019–20 | Växjö Lakers | SHL | 31 | 7 | 6 | 13 | 4 | — | — | — | — | — |
| 2020–21 | Växjö Lakers | SHL | 12 | 0 | 1 | 1 | 14 | — | — | — | — | — |
| 2020–21 | Västerviks IK | Allsv | 23 | 1 | 4 | 5 | 10 | — | — | — | — | — |
| 2020–21 | Södertälje SK | Allsv | 14 | 2 | 6 | 8 | 8 | 4 | 0 | 0 | 0 | 0 |
| 2021–22 | HV71 | Allsv | 50 | 11 | 13 | 24 | 18 | 13 | 4 | 0 | 4 | 4 |
| 2022–23 | HV71 | SHL | 21 | 1 | 2 | 3 | 2 | — | — | — | — | — |
| 2022–23 | Tappara | Liiga | 31 | 8 | 15 | 23 | 8 | 14 | 4 | 0 | 4 | 10 |
| 2023–24 | Ässät | Liiga | 45 | 9 | 9 | 18 | 31 | — | — | — | — | — |
| SHL totals | | | 158 | 26 | 35 | 61 | 38 | 34 | 3 | 8 | 11 | 22 |

Medal record

Representing Sweden

Ice hockey

World Junior Championships
| Silver medal – second place | 2018 United States | |

IIHF World U18 Championship
| Silver medal – second place | 2016 United States | |

=== International ===
| Year | Team | Event | Result | GP | G | A | Pts | PIM |
|---|---|---|---|---|---|---|---|---|
| 2014 | Sweden | U17 | 3rd place, bronze medalist(s) | 6 | 1 | 1 | 2 | 0 |
| 2015 | Sweden | IH18 | 2nd place, silver medalist(s) | 5 | 0 | 0 | 0 | 4 |
| 2016 | Sweden | U18 | 2nd place, silver medalist(s) | 4 | 2 | 1 | 3 | 0 |
| 2018 | Sweden | WJC | 2nd place, silver medalist(s) | 7 | 1 | 2 | 3 | 0 |
| Junior totals | | | | 22 | 4 | 4 | 8 | 4 |
