= Timothy Liljegren =

Swedish ice hockey player (born 1999)

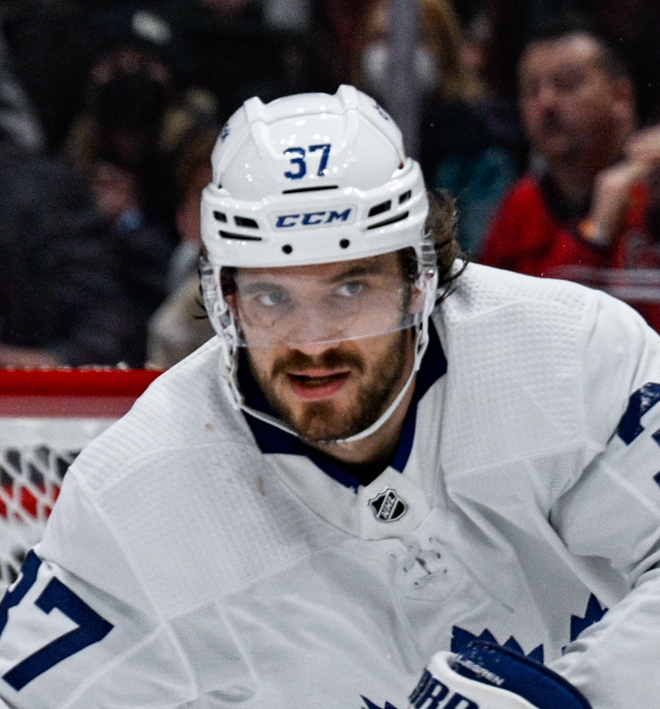
- Liljegren with the Toronto Maple Leafs in 2022
- Born: 30 April 1999 (age 27) Kristianstad, Sweden
- Height: 6 ft 1 in (185 cm)
- Weight: 200 lb (91 kg; 14 st 4 lb)
- Position: Defence
- Shoots: Right
- NHL team Former teams: Washington Capitals; Rögle BK; Toronto Maple Leafs; San Jose Sharks
- National team: Sweden
- NHL draft: 17th overall, 2017; Toronto Maple Leafs
- Playing career: 2015–present

Timothy Winston Liljegren (born 30 April 1999) is a Swedish professional ice hockey player who is a defenceman for the Washington Capitals of the National Hockey League (NHL). He previously played for the Toronto Maple Leafs and San Jose Sharks. The Maple Leafs drafted him in the first round, 17th overall, in the 2017 NHL entry draft. Internationally, he represents Sweden.

== Playing career ==
=== Swedish Hockey League ===
Liljegren made his Swedish Hockey League debut on 3 December 2015 playing with Rögle BK during the 2015–16 SHL season. Liljegren missed the first two months of the 2016–17 season after getting mononucleosis.

=== National Hockey League ===
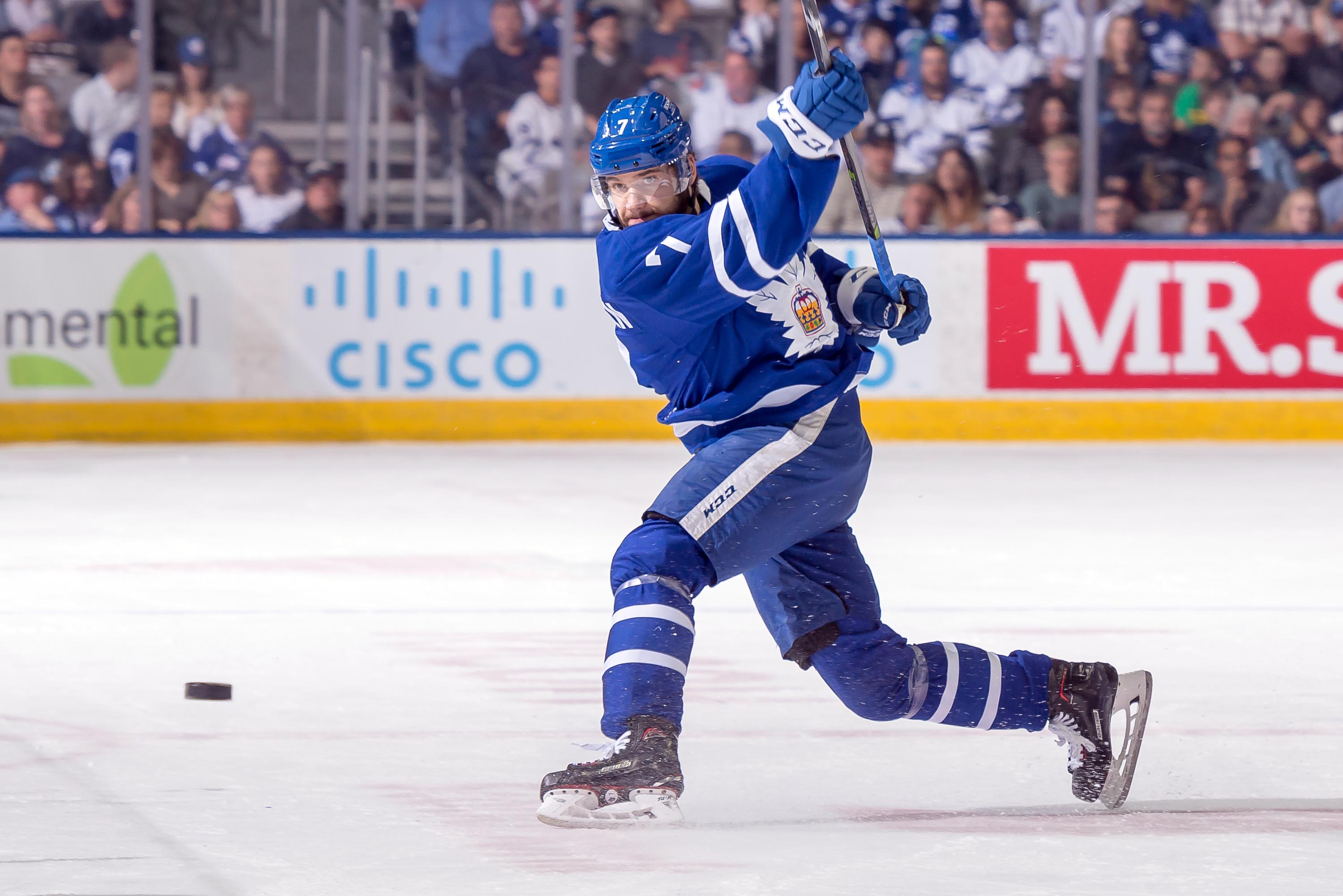
Liljegren taking a slapshot during the 2018 Calder Cup Finals.

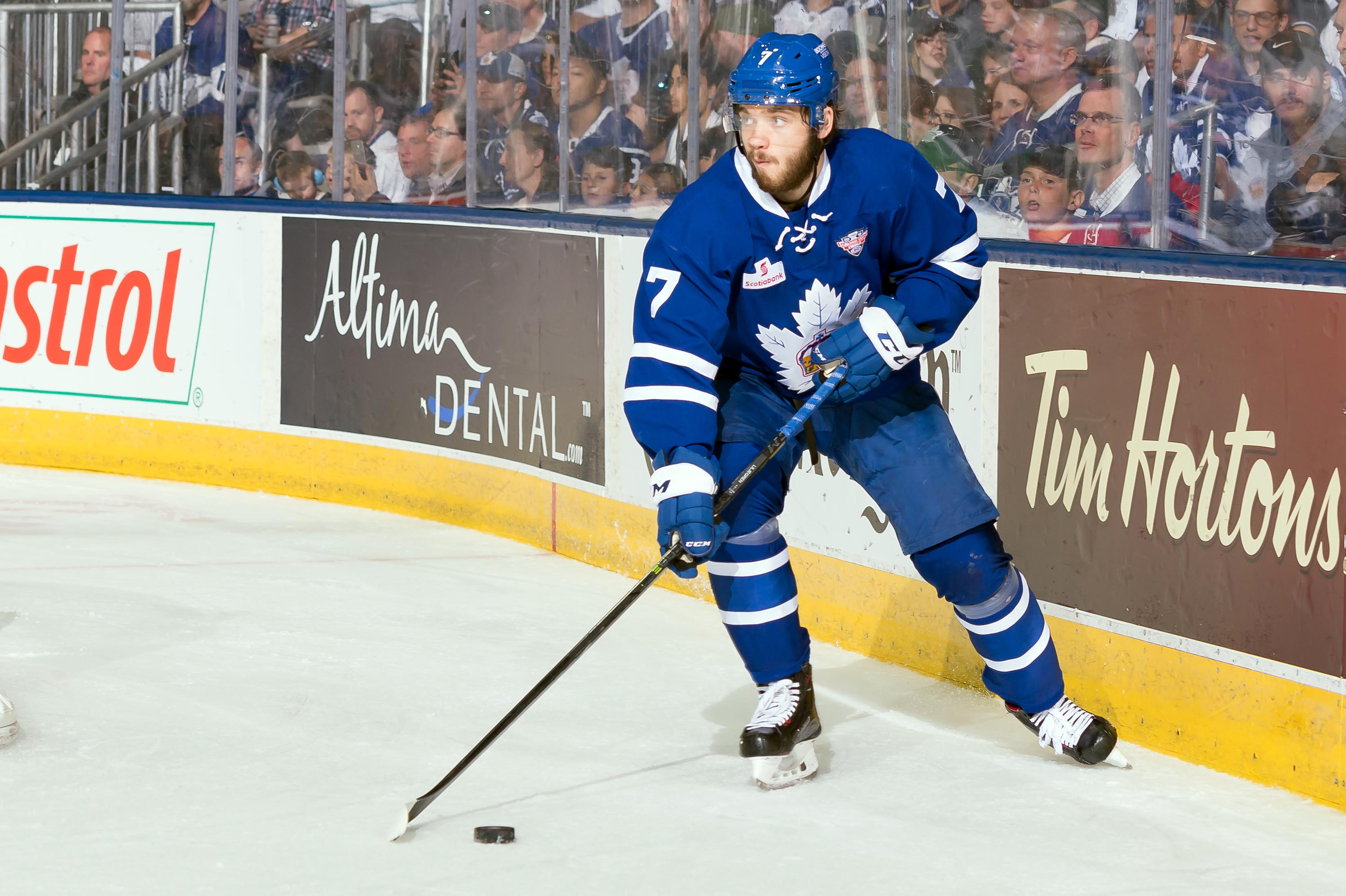
Liljegren with the Marlies in 2018

On 23 June 2017, Liljegren was selected in the first-round, 17th overall, by the Toronto Maple Leafs in the 2017 NHL entry draft. He later agreed with the Maple Leafs to a three-year, entry-level contract on 12 July 2017. Liljegren was assigned to the Maple Leafs' American Hockey League (AHL) affiliate, the Toronto Marlies, for their 2017–18 season. In his rookie season, he was the youngest defenceman in the AHL. That same season, the Marlies beat the Texas Stars to win the Calder Cup.

Liljegren made his NHL debut with the Maple Leafs on 18 January 2020 in a 6–2 defeat against the Chicago Blackhawks. He earned his first NHL point in his sixth NHL game; an assist in a 4–2 victory over the Ottawa Senators.

Liljegren scored his first National Hockey League goal on 15 January 2022 against Jordan Binnington of the St. Louis Blues.

On 27 June 2022, Liljegren signed a two-year $2.8 million contract with the Maple Leafs. He missed the beginning of the 2022–23 season with a hernia. He played his first game of the season on 5 November against the Boston Bruins.

On 30 October 2024, Liljegren was traded to the San Jose Sharks in exchange for Matt Benning, a third-round pick in 2025, and a sixth-round pick in 2026.

Liljegren was again traded to the Washington Capitals on 6 March 2026 for a 4th-round pick in 2026.

== Personal life ==
Liljegren was born and grew up in Kristianstad. He and his two older brothers (William and Anthony) were raised by a single mother, Lena Liljegren, after Liljegren's father left the family early in his life. At age 14, his family moved to Ängelholm, home of the Rögle BK hockey program, to further his hockey career.

Liljegren holds American citizenship through his father, an American from New Jersey.

== Career statistics ==
=== Regular season and playoffs ===
			Regular season					Playoffs
Season	Team	League	GP	G	A	Pts	PIM	GP	G	A	Pts	PIM
2015–16	Rögle BK	J20	29	7	15	22	26	3	1	2	3	0
2015–16	Rögle BK	SHL	19	1	4	5	4	—	—	—	—	—
2016–17	Rögle BK	J20	12	5	2	7	8	3	1	4	5	0
2016–17	Rögle BK	SHL	19	1	4	5	4	—	—	—	—	—
2016–17	Timrå IK	Allsv	5	0	1	1	4	—	—	—	—	—
2017–18	Toronto Marlies	AHL	44	1	16	17	20	20	0	4	4	6
2018–19	Toronto Marlies	AHL	43	3	12	15	18	13	0	5	5	8
2018–19	Newfoundland Growlers	ECHL	1	0	0	0	0	—	—	—	—	—
2019–20	Toronto Marlies	AHL	40	5	25	30	18	—	—	—	—	—
2019–20	Toronto Maple Leafs	NHL	11	0	1	1	2	—	—	—	—	—
2020–21	Toronto Marlies	AHL	21	2	9	11	10	—	—	—	—	—
2020–21	Toronto Maple Leafs	NHL	2	0	0	0	2	—	—	—	—	—
2021–22	Toronto Maple Leafs	NHL	61	5	18	23	14	2	0	0	0	0
2022–23	Toronto Marlies	AHL	2	0	1	1	0	—	—	—	—	—
2022–23	Toronto Maple Leafs	NHL	67	6	12	18	30	5	0	0	0	0
2023–24	Toronto Maple Leafs	NHL	55	3	20	23	16	6	0	1	1	2
2024–25	Toronto Maple Leafs	NHL	1	0	0	0	2	—	—	—	—	—
2024–25	San Jose Sharks	NHL	67	6	11	17	36	—	—	—	—	—
2025–26	San Jose Sharks	NHL	43	1	10	11	27	—	—	—	—	—
2025–26	Washington Capitals	NHL	4	0	0	0	2	—	—	—	—	—
SHL totals			38	2	8	10	8	—	—	—	—	—
NHL totals			311	21	72	93	131	13	0	1	1	2

Medal record

Representing Sweden

Ice hockey

World Junior Championships
Silver medal – second place	2018 United States	

IIHF World U18 Championship
Silver medal – second place	2016 United States	

=== International ===
Year	Team	Event	Result	GP	G	A	Pts	PIM
2015	Sweden	U17	3rd place, bronze medalist(s)	6	3	2	5	6
2016	Sweden	WJC18	2nd place, silver medalist(s)	7	1	5	6	0
2016	Sweden	IH18	4th	5	1	3	4	2
2017	Sweden	WJC18	4th	7	0	2	2	4
2018	Sweden	WJC	2nd place, silver medalist(s)	7	1	1	2	4
2023	Sweden	WC	6th	5	2	2	4	4
Junior totals				32	6	13	19	16
Senior totals				5	2	2	4	4

== Awards and honors ==
Awards	Year
AHL
Calder Cup champion	2018
AHL All-Star Game	2020

Awards and achievements
Preceded by Auston Matthews	Toronto Maple Leafs first-round draft pick 2017	Succeeded by Rasmus Sandin
