= Juuso Välimäki =

Finnish ice hockey player (born 1998)

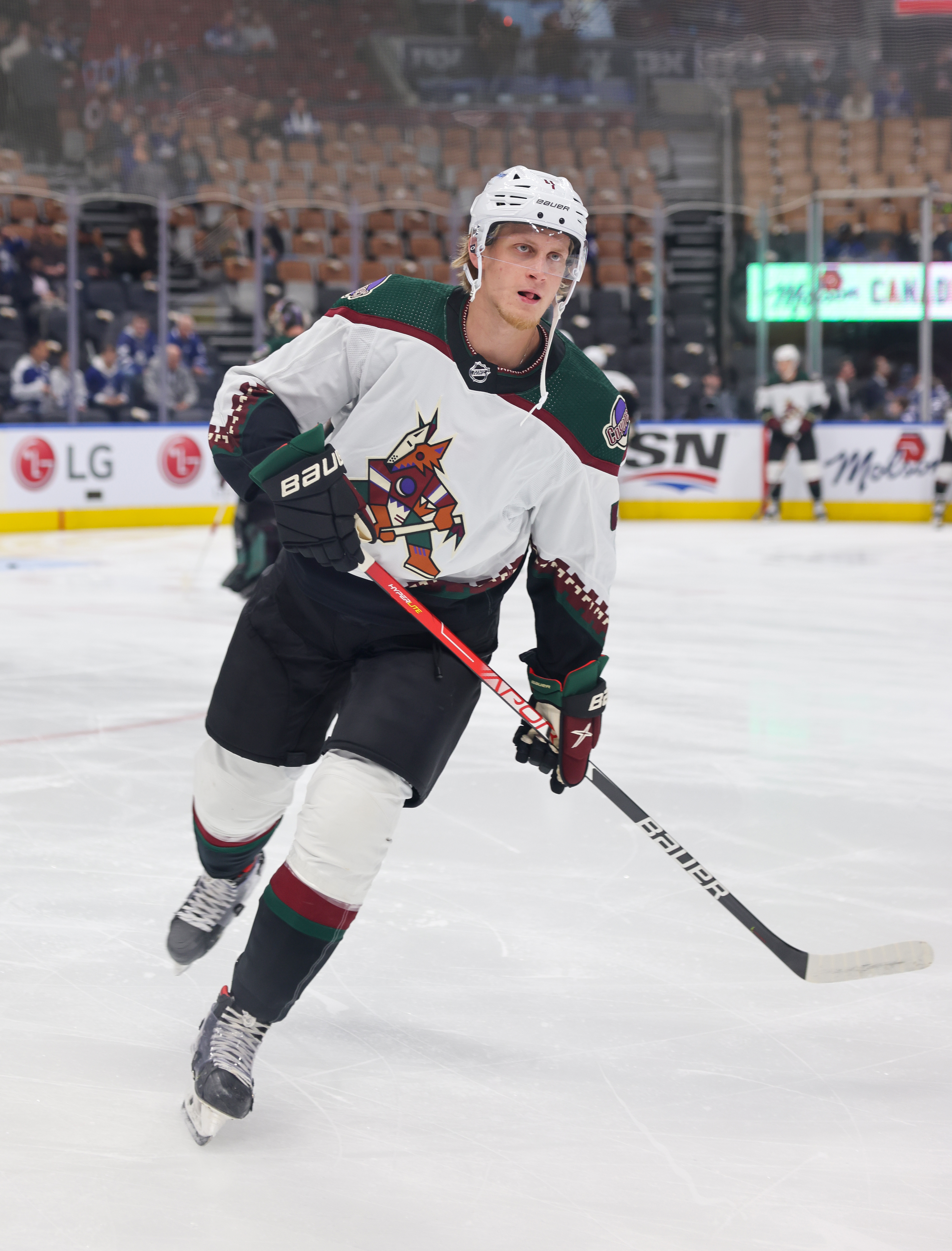
- Välimäki in 2022 with the Arizona Coyotes
- Born: 6 October 1998 (age 28) Nokia, Finland
- Height: 6 ft 2 in (188 cm)
- Weight: 201 lb (91 kg; 14 st 5 lb)
- Position: Defence
- Shoots: Left
- NHL team Former teams: Carolina Hurricanes; Calgary Flames; Ilves; Arizona Coyotes; Utah Mammoth
- National team: Finland
- NHL draft: 16th overall, 2017; Calgary Flames
- Playing career: 2018–present

Juuso Välimäki (born 6 October 1998) is a Finnish professional ice hockey player who is a defenceman for the Carolina Hurricanes of the National Hockey League (NHL). He was selected by the Calgary Flames in the first round, 16th overall, in the 2017 NHL entry draft, and has also played for the Arizona Coyotes and Utah Mammoth.

== Playing career ==
=== Amateur ===
Välimäki was selected 14th overall by the Tri-City Americans of the Western Hockey League (WHL) in the 2015 Canadian Hockey League Import draft. He debuted with the Americans in the 2015–16 season, playing in 56 games, scoring seven goals, 25 assists for 32 points. He returned to Tri-City for the 2016–17 season, improving his scoring, recording 19 goals and 61 points in 60 games. He was named to the WHL's Western Conference Second All-Star Team alongside teammates Parker Wotherspoon and Morgan Geekie. The Americans made the 2017 WHL playoffs and faced the Seattle Thunderbirds in the first round best-of-seven series. Tri-City was swept in four games, with Välimäki recording just one assist in the series. In his third and final season with Tri-City, he appeared in just 43 games, marking 14 goals and 45 points. He was named a WHL Western Conference Second Team All-Star for the second consecutive season, this time representing the team alone. The Americans made the 2018 WHL playoffs and swept their first round series with the Kelowna Rockets and their second round series against the Victoria Royals. However, in the third round, they ran into their division rival, the Everett Silvertips, and were eliminated in six games. In the Americans' 12 playoff games, Välimäki added four goals and 17 points and was a "rock on the blueline".

=== Professional ===
==== Calgary Flames ====
Ahead of the National Hockey League (NHL)'s 2017 NHL entry draft, Välimäki was ranked 11th of North American skaters by the NHL Central Scouting Bureau, and ranked the 14th skater by ISS Hockey. He was selected by the Calgary Flames in the first round, 16th overall, before signing a three-year, entry-level contract with the Flames on 21 July 2017. Välimäki opened the 2018–19 season with the Flames after making the team out of training camp. He made his NHL debut on 3 October 2018, against the Vancouver Canucks. He scored his first NHL goal on 17 October, the third Flames goal in a 5–2 victory over the Boston Bruins; Välimäki scored the goal on Tuukka Rask, who had lost control of the puck after initially catching a piece of Välimäki's shot. Välimäki suffered a high ankle sprain on 23 November in a game against the Vegas Golden Knights which limited his season. He was assigned to Calgary's American Hockey League (AHL) affiliate, the Stockton Heat, on 22 January 2019 and played in 20 AHL games, registering four goals and 14 points. He was recalled by Calgary at the end of the season and played in two more games. In total, he played in 24 games with Calgary, registering the one goal and three points. The Flames made the 2019 Stanley Cup playoffs and Välimäki made his playoff debut on 17 April in the first round series against the Colorado Avalanche. He assisted on Derek Ryan's second period goal in the Flames' game 4 loss. The Flames were eliminated by the Avalanche in five games, and Välimäki recorded the one assist in the two games he played in the series.

While training in the offseason, Välimäki suffered a torn ACL injury that required surgery to repair. He missed the entire 2019–20 season, which was shortened due to the COVID-19 pandemic. Though he was healthy when play resumed in August 2020 for the 2020 Stanley Cup playoffs, Calgary had replaced him in the lineup with trade acquisitions and Välimäki was a healthy scratch. As the following North American season was delayed due to the pandemic, Välimäki was loaned by the Flames to Finnish Liiga club, Ilves, to start the 2020–21 season on 30 September 2020. Välimäki made a successful return from injury with Ilves, playing in a key role and producing at a point-per-game pace through 19 regular season contests, recording two goals and 17 assists.

Välimäki returned to Calgary for the NHL's 2020–21 season, which was difficult for him. He appeared in 49 of the Flames' games, marking two goals and nine points while being a healthy scratch multiple times. In the 2021 offseason, he signed a two-year contract with the Flames on 20 August 2021. He began the 2021–22 season with the Flames, though was rarely utilised, appearing only eight times in the first two months and was a healthy scratch 15 times. He was assigned to Stockton on 2 December. He played in 35 games with the Heat, scoring two goals and 18 points. He was recalled by the Flames on 4 April 2022 and appeared in one more game. In total he made nine appearances for Calgary, recording two assists. He was returned to the AHL on 27 May and appeared in Stockton's 2022 playoff run, appearing in ten games, recording two assists.

==== Arizona Coyotes ====
Prior to the 2022–23 season, after being unable to make the Flames opening night roster, Välimäki was placed on waivers before he was claimed the following day, on 9 October 2022, by the Arizona Coyotes. He made his Coyotes debut on 17 October in a 4–2 win over the Toronto Maple Leafs. He recorded his first point with the Coyotes on two games later on 22 October, assisting on Dylan Guenther's first career NHL goal in the second period of a 6–2 loss to the Ottawa Senators. He scored his first goal in a Coyotes uniform on 3 November in the third period to break Scott Wedgewood's shutout bid in a 7–2 loss to the Dallas Stars. On 11 February 2023, he recorded four assists in a 6–5 overtime loss to the St. Louis Blues. He registered a three-point night on 18 March, scoring one goal and marking two assists in a 4–2 victory over the Chicago Blackhawks. Establishing a regular role within the Coyotes on the blueline, Välimäki was signed to a one-year, $1 million contract extension at the mid-point of the season on 24 January 2023. He finished the season with four goals and 34 points in 78 games with the Coyotes.

In his second season with Arizona in 2023–24, Välimäki suffered an injury early on when on he was struck in the face with a puck in a game on 15 November against the Dallas Stars. He underwent surgery to fix the damage, but the process in which he was left for several hours without care at a Dallas hospital was investigated by both the NHL and the National Hockey League Players' Association. He returned to the lineup on 30 November after missing six games. In January 2024 he went through a period of healthy scratches as the depth of defencemen on the Coyotes reached its peak with everyone returning from injury. He finished the season with two goals and 17 points in 68 games.

==== Utah Mammoth ====
Shortly after the end of the 2023–24 regular season, the Coyotes' franchise was suspended and team assets were subsequently transferred to the expansion team Utah Mammoth; as a result, he became a member of the Mammoth. In the 2024 offseason, he signed a two-year contract with Utah on 29 June. After playing in 43 games for the Mammoth in the 2024–25 NHL season, registering two goals and five points, he was placed on waivers on 25 February and assigned to Utah's AHL affiliate, the Tucson Roadrunners. In his first game playing for Tucson, Välimäki tore his ACL on 28 February and was expected to be out for nine months to recover. On 28 December 2025, Välimäki was placed on waivers by the Mammoth to be assigned to the Tucson Roadrunners. He made three appearances for Tucson, scoring one goal and three points.

==== Carolina Hurricanes ====
On 5 January 2026, Välimäki was traded by the Mammoth to the Carolina Hurricanes in exchange for future considerations. Assigned to AHL affiliate, the Chicago Wolves, Välimäki regained his scoring output for the remainder of the season, helping the club to the Calder Cup finals to conclude his season.

As a pending free agent, Välimäki initially opted to return to Europe in agreeing to a two-year contract with Swedish club, Brynäs IF of the Swedish Hockey League, on 23 June 2026. However, he enacted his NHL out clause the following day, re-signing with the Hurricanes to a one-year, $900,000 contract for the 2026–27 season.

== International play ==
Medal record

Representing Finland

Ice hockey

IIHF World U18 Championship
Gold medal – first place	2016 United States	
Silver medal – second place	2015 Switzerland	

Välimäki was named to team Finland at the 2015 IIHF World U18 Championships, which eventually earned a silver medal after a 2–1 overtime loss against the United States. Välimäki finished the 2015 tournament with one assist in seven games. The following year Välimäki was named captain and led Finland to the gold medal at 2016 IIHF World U18 Championships defeating Sweden 6–1. Välimäki finished the 2016 World Championship with two assists in six games.

Välimäki was named to team Finland in the 2017 World Junior Ice Hockey Championships, scoring two goals in six games as Finland finished with only one win in the tournament. In December 2017, Välimäki was named captain of Team Finland at the 2018 World Junior Ice Hockey Championships. Finland was subsequently eliminated in the quarterfinals against the Czech Republic with a final score of 4–3, and Välimäki finished the 2018 World Juniors with one goal and three assists in six games.

== Personal life ==
Välimäki was born in Tampere, Finland, but grew up in Nokia, Finland. Välimäki received an invitation to the Finnish Independence Day Reception in 2016. Välimäki is the cousin of Finnish golfer Sami Välimäki.

== Career statistics ==
=== Regular season and playoffs ===
			Regular season					Playoffs
Season	Team	League	GP	G	A	Pts	PIM	GP	G	A	Pts	PIM
2014–15	Ilves	Jr. A	44	5	15	20	20	10	1	3	4	6
2015–16	Tri-City Americans	WHL	56	7	25	32	24	—	—	—	—	—
2016–17	Tri-City Americans	WHL	60	19	42	61	34	4	0	1	1	8
2017–18	Tri-City Americans	WHL	43	14	31	45	34	12	4	13	17	4
2018–19	Calgary Flames	NHL	24	1	2	3	12	2	0	1	1	0
2018–19	Stockton Heat	AHL	20	4	10	14	18	—	—	—	—	—
2020–21	Ilves	Liiga	19	2	17	19	20	—	—	—	—	—
2020–21	Calgary Flames	NHL	49	2	9	11	26	—	—	—	—	—
2021–22	Calgary Flames	NHL	9	0	2	2	10	—	—	—	—	—
2021–22	Stockton Heat	AHL	35	2	16	18	26	10	0	2	2	14
2022–23	Arizona Coyotes	NHL	78	4	30	34	59	—	—	—	—	—
2023–24	Arizona Coyotes	NHL	68	2	15	17	12	—	—	—	—	—
2024–25	Utah Hockey Club	NHL	43	2	3	5	14	—	—	—	—	—
2024–25	Tucson Roadrunners	AHL	1	0	0	0	2	—	—	—	—	—
2025–26	Tucson Roadrunners	AHL	3	1	2	3	0	—	—	—	—	—
2025–26	Chicago Wolves	AHL	24	6	14	20	12	21	5	9	14	14
NHL totals			271	11	61	72	133	2	0	1	1	0
Liiga totals			19	2	17	19	20	—	—	—	—	—

=== International ===
Year	Team	Event	Result	GP	G	A	Pts	PIM
2014	Finland	IH18	5th	4	0	1	1	0
2015	Finland	U18	2nd place, silver medalist(s)	7	0	1	1	6
2015	Finland	IH18	4th	5	1	0	1	4
2016	Finland	U18	1st place, gold medalist(s)	6	0	2	2	0
2017	Finland	WJC	9th	6	2	0	2	6
2018	Finland	WJC	6th	5	1	3	4	4
2025	Finland	4NF	4th	—	—	—	—	—
Junior totals				33	4	7	11	20

== Awards and honours ==
Award	Year
WHL
WHL Second All-Star Team (West)	2017, 2018

Awards and achievements
Preceded by Matthew Tkachuk	Calgary Flames first-round draft pick 2017	Succeeded by Jakob Pelletier
