= Kieffer Bellows =

American ice hockey player (born 1998)

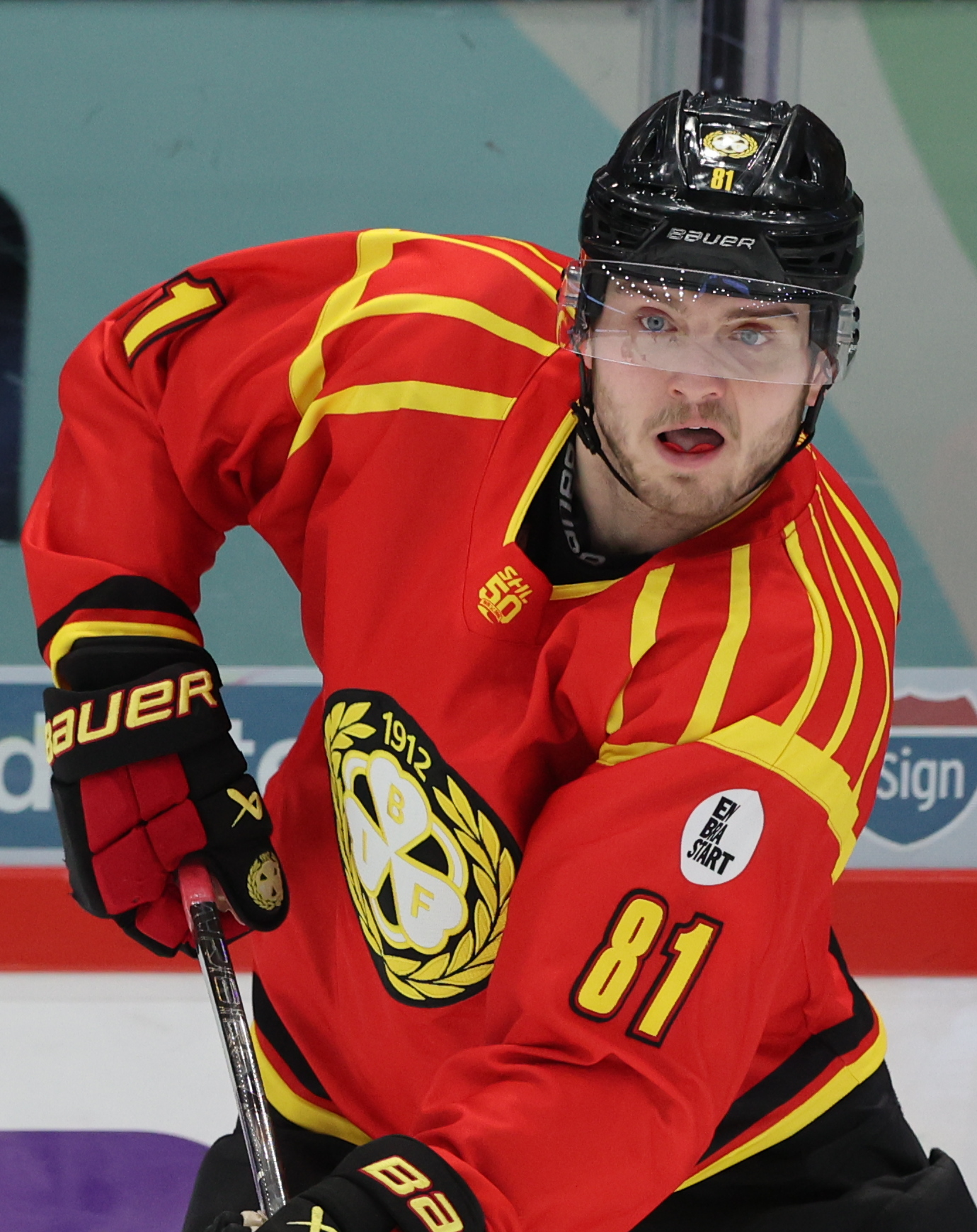
- Born: June 10, 1998 (age 28) Edina, Minnesota, U.S.
- Height: 6 ft 0 in (183 cm)
- Weight: 195 lb (88 kg; 13 st 13 lb)
- Position: Left wing
- Shoots: Left
- SHL team Former teams: Brynäs IF; New York Islanders; Philadelphia Flyers; Nashville Predators
- National team: United States
- NHL draft: 19th overall, 2016; New York Islanders
- Playing career: 2018–present

Kieffer Bellows (born June 10, 1998) is an American professional ice hockey forward who is currently playing for Brynäs IF of the Swedish Hockey League (SHL). He was drafted in the first round (19th overall) of the 2016 NHL entry draft by the New York Islanders. He is the son of former NHL player Brian Bellows.

== Playing career ==
Bellows grew up playing hockey in Edina, Minnesota where he won a Minnesota 2014 Class 2A State Championship as a sophomore at Edina High School. Before being drafted into the NHL, he played with the Sioux Falls Stampede and U.S. National Development Team of the United States Hockey League (USHL). In his rookie season with the Stampede, Bellows was fifth in the United States Hockey League with 33 goals and was named USHL Rookie of the Year. Bellows then went on to play with Boston University before being drafted in the first round of the 2016 NHL entry draft by the New York Islanders. On September 22, 2017, Bellows was signed to a three-year, entry-level contract with the Islanders. Bellows chose to forgo the three remaining years of his NCAA eligibility and subsequently joined the Portland Winterhawks of the Western Hockey League (WHL), who has drafted him in the 2013 WHL Bantam Draft.

Bellows made his NHL debut on February 4, 2020, in the Islander's 4–3 overtime win against the Dallas Stars and also recorded his first NHL point when he assisted on Derick Brassard's goal. Bellows scored his two NHL goals in the Islanders' 5–3 win against the Los Angeles Kings on February 6.

On October 9, 2020, the American Hockey League (AHL) announced that Bellows had violated the league's performance enhancing substances rules. On March 13, 2021, Bellows became the first player in Islanders history to score his first four NHL goals in a pair of two-goal games.

In September 2021 and August 2022, Bellows was signed to one-year contracts by the Islanders. Bellows opened the 2022–23 season with the Islanders, featuring on opening night before serving as a healthy scratch through 6 games before he was placed on waivers by the Islanders. Bellows was claimed off waivers the following day by the Philadelphia Flyers on October 27, 2022. Bellows was unable to establish himself within the Flyers, registering just 3 goals through 27 games with an assignment to AHL affiliate, the Lehigh Valley Phantoms during his tenure.

As a pending restricted free agent, Bellows was not tendered a qualifying offer by the Flyers on 15 June 2023. He joined the Carolina Hurricanes on a professional try-out agreement on September 12, 2023, but was released less than a month later. He subsequently joined the Toronto Marlies on a professional tryout contract (PTO) on October 30, 2023. Bellows was subsequently signed to an AHL contract for the remainder of the 2023–24 season with the Marlies and posted his most productive season of his professional career in notching 27 goals and 49 points through 52 regular season games.

As a free agent in the off-season, Bellows secured an NHL contract after agreeing to terms on a one-year, two-way contract with the Nashville Predators on July 3, 2024. In the 2024–25 season, Bellows was recalled after impressing with the Milwaukee Admirals in the AHL, and made 19 appearances in the NHL for the Predators, adding 2 goals and 4 points.

Having concluded his contract with the Predators, Bellows opted to pursue a career abroad after agreeing to a one-year contract with Swedish club, Brynäs IF of the SHL, on July 13, 2025.

== Personal life ==
He is the son of former NHL player Brian Bellows.

== Career statistics ==
=== Regular season and playoffs ===
			Regular season					Playoffs
Season	Team	League	GP	G	A	Pts	PIM	GP	G	A	Pts	PIM
2014–15	Sioux Falls Stampede	USHL	58	33	19	52	78	12	9	3	12	12
2015–16	U.S. National Development Team	USHL	23	16	16	32	41	—	—	—	—	—
2016–17	Boston University	HE	34	7	7	14	40	—	—	—	—	—
2017–18	Portland Winterhawks	WHL	56	41	33	74	63	12	3	10	13	12
2018–19	Bridgeport Sound Tigers	AHL	73	12	7	19	101	5	2	1	3	0
2019–20	Bridgeport Sound Tigers	AHL	52	22	9	31	49	—	—	—	—	—
2019–20	New York Islanders	NHL	8	2	1	3	2	—	—	—	—	—
2020–21	New York Islanders	NHL	14	3	0	3	4	—	—	—	—	—
2021–22	New York Islanders	NHL	45	6	13	19	19	—	—	—	—	—
2022–23	New York Islanders	NHL	1	0	0	0	0	—	—	—	—	—
2022–23	Philadelphia Flyers	NHL	27	3	0	3	6	—	—	—	—	—
2022–23	Lehigh Valley Phantoms	AHL	12	3	7	10	16	—	—	—	—	—
2023–24	Toronto Marlies	AHL	52	27	22	49	40	3	0	0	0	4
2024–25	Milwaukee Admirals	AHL	44	15	16	31	56	10	3	6	9	6
2024–25	Nashville Predators	NHL	19	2	2	4	6	—	—	—	—	—
2025–26	Brynäs IF	SHL	52	15	15	30	33	5	0	2	2	22
NHL totals			114	16	16	32	37	—	—	—	—	—
SHL totals			52	15	15	30	33	5	0	2	2	22

Medal record

Representing United States

Ice hockey

World Junior Championships
Gold medal – first place	2017 Canada	
Bronze medal – third place	2018 United States	

IIHF World U18 Championship
Bronze medal – third place	2016 United States	

=== International ===
Year	Team	Event	Result	GP	G	A	Pts	PIM
2016	United States	U18	3rd place, bronze medalist(s)	7	5	3	8	8
2017	United States	WJC	1st place, gold medalist(s)	7	2	1	3	6
2018	United States	WJC	3rd place, bronze medalist(s)	7	9	1	10	4
2022	United States	WC	4th	10	3	2	5	7
Junior totals				21	16	5	21	18
Senior totals				10	3	2	5	7

Awards and achievements
Preceded by Anthony Beauvillier	New York Islanders first round pick 2016	Succeeded by Oliver Wahlstrom
