= Matt Hellickson =

American ice hockey player (born 1998)

- Born: March 21, 1998 (age 28) Rogers, Minnesota, U.S.
- Height: 6 ft 0 in (183 cm)
- Weight: 183 lb (83 kg; 13 st 1 lb)
- Position: Defence
- Shot: Left
- Played for: Binghamton Devils; Toronto Marlies
- National team: United States
- NHL draft: 214th overall, 2017; New Jersey Devils
- Playing career: 2021–2023

Matthew Hellickson (born March 21, 1998) is an American former professional ice hockey defenceman. He most recently played under contract to the Toronto Marlies of the American Hockey League (AHL). He was drafted 214th overall in the 2017 NHL entry draft by the New Jersey Devils.

Hellickson represented the United States at the 2021 IIHF World Championship.

== Career statistics ==
=== Regular season and playoffs ===
			Regular season`					Playoffs
Season	Team	League	GP	G	A	Pts	PIM	GP	G	A	Pts	PIM
2012–13	Rogers High	USHS	25	4	7	11	23	2	0	0	0	0
2013–14	Rogers High	USHS	24	4	23	27	16	1	1	0	1	0
2014–15	U.S. National Development Team	USHL	30	0	1	1	14	—	—	—	—	—
2015–16	U.S. National Development Team	USHL	25	0	5	5	8	—	—	—	—	—
2016–17	Sioux City Musketeers	USHL	52	6	22	28	30	13	1	0	1	6
2017–18	Notre Dame	B1G	40	3	9	12	12	—	—	—	—	—
2018–19	Notre Dame	B1G	40	4	12	16	16	—	—	—	—	—
2019–20	Notre Dame	B1G	37	5	11	16	16	—	—	—	—	—
2020–21	Notre Dame	B1G	29	1	7	8	10	—	—	—	—	—
2020–21	Binghamton Devils	AHL	5	0	0	0	19	—	—	—	—	—
2021–22	Toronto Marlies	AHL	26	1	5	6	22	—	—	—	—	—
2021–22	Newfoundland Growlers	ECHL	13	1	6	7	4	18	2	3	5	8
2022–23	Toronto Marlies	AHL	30	1	5	6	16	—	—	—	—	—
2022–23	Newfoundland Growlers	ECHL	5	0	1	1	4	16	2	1	3	24
AHL totals			61	2	10	12	57	—	—	—	—	—

Medal record

Representing United States

World Championships
Bronze medal – third place	2021 Latvia	

World U18 Championships
Bronze medal – third place	2016 United States	

=== International ===
Year	Team	Event	Result	GP	G	A	Pts	PIM
2014	United States	U17	2nd place, silver medalist(s)	6	0	0	0	2
2016	United States	U18	3rd place, bronze medalist(s)	7	0	4	4	0
2021	United States	WC	3rd place, bronze medalist(s)	9	0	1	1	0
Junior totals				13	0	4	4	2
Senior totals				9	0	1	1	0

== Awards and honors ==
Award	Year	Ref
College
B1G Honorable Mention All-Star Team	2020	
B1G Sportsmanship Award	2021	
