= Christian Wejse =

Danish ice hockey player (born 1995)

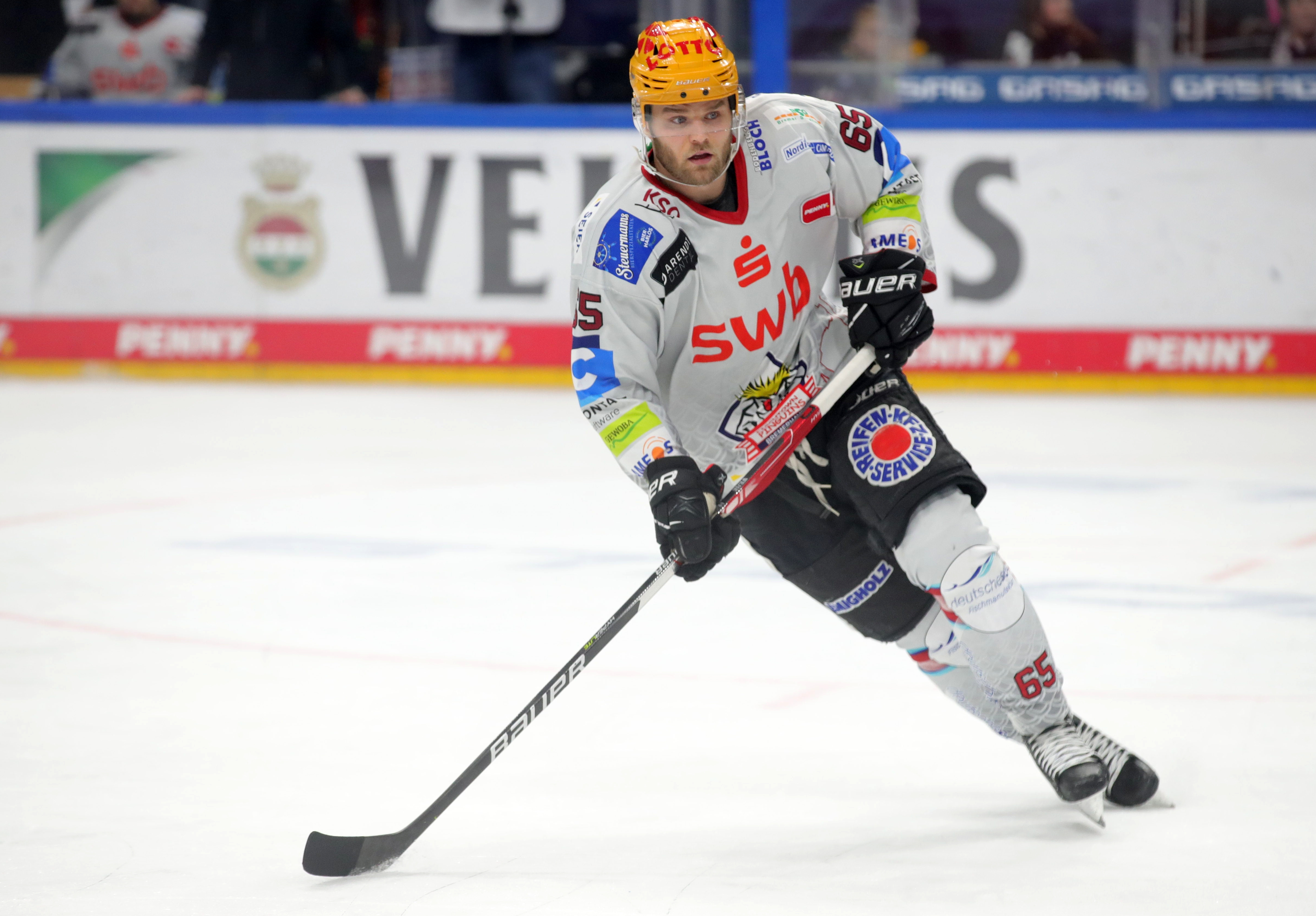
- Wejse in 2022
- Born: 4 December 1998 (age 27) Esbjerg, Denmark
- Height: 1.86 m (6 ft 1 in)
- Weight: 88 kg (194 lb; 13 st 12 lb)
- Position: Forward
- Shoots: Right
- DEL team Former teams: Fischtown Pinguins; Esbjerg Energy
- National team: Denmark
- NHL draft: Undrafted
- Playing career: 2014–present

Christian Wejse (born 4 December 1998) is a Danish professional ice hockey player who is a forward for the Fischtown Pinguins of the Deutsche Eishockey Liga (DEL).

== Playing career ==
Previously, Wejse played for the Esbjerg Energy in the Metal Ligaen.

== International play ==
Wejse represented the Denmark national team at the 2026 Winter Olympics and the 2022, 2023, 2024, and 2025 IIHF World Championship.

== Career statistics ==
=== Regular season and playoffs ===
			Regular season					Playoffs
Season	Team	League	GP	G	A	Pts	PIM	GP	G	A	Pts	PIM
2012–13	Esbjerg U17	Denmark U17	15	4	2	6	8	6	5	3	8	4
2013–14	Esbjerg U17	Denmark U17	16	10	9	19	86	11	9	8	17	14
2013–14	Esbjerg IK	Denmark2	24	2	4	6	45	—	—	—	—	—
2013–14	Esbjerg U20	Denmark U20	17	10	5	15	67	—	—	—	—	—
2014–15	Esbjerg U17	Denmark U17	15	22	23	45	32	—	—	—	—	—
2014–15	Esbjerg IK	Denmark2	27	13	11	24	67	2	2	0	2	42
2014–15	Esbjerg Energy	Denmark	18	0	0	0	0	9	0	0	0	0
2015–16	Esbjerg IK	Denmark2	19	13	25	38	42	—	—	—	—	—
2015–16	Esbjerg Energy	Denmark	41	2	1	3	55	12	1	1	2	4
2016–17	Blainville-Boisbriand Armada	QMJHL	23	2	1	3	11	11	0	0	0	16
2017–18	Esbjerg Energy	Denmark	40	5	5	10	79	12	2	2	4	20
2018–19	Esbjerg Energy	Denmark	39	12	14	26	93	3	0	2	2	29
2019–20	Esbjerg Energy	Denmark	42	9	10	19	57	—	—	—	—	—
2020–21	Esbjerg Energy	Denmark	43	13	20	33	18	13	7	7	14	8
2021–22	Fischtown Pinguins	DEL	51	8	17	25	54	5	0	1	1	7
2022–23	Fischtown Pinguins	DEL	53	15	9	24	60	8	1	1	2	7
2023–24	Fischtown Pinguins	DEL	47	17	9	26	40	14	3	0	3	8
2024–25	Fischtown Pinguins	DEL	48	12	14	26	72	6	1	1	2	4
2025–26	Fischtown Pinguins	DEL	42	14	10	24	73	7	2	4	6	17
DEL totals			241	66	59	125	299	40	7	7	14	43

=== International ===
Year	Team	Event	GP	G	A	Pts	PIM
2016	Denmark U18	WJC-18	7	2	2	4	14
2017	Denmark U20	WJC-20	5	0	0	0	6
2018	Denmark U20	WJC-20	5	0	0	0	6
2022	Denmark	WC	2	0	0	0	2
2023	Denmark	WC	6	2	1	3	0
2024	Denmark	WC	7	3	3	6	4
2024	Denmark	OGQ	3	1	0	1	0
2025	Denmark	WC	10	2	2	4	8
2026	Denmark	OG	4	0	1	1	2
2026	Denmark	WC	6	1	0	1	6
Junior totals			17	2	2	4	26
Senior totals			38	9	7	16	22
