= Kasper Kotkansalo =

Finnish ice hockey player (born 1998)

- Born: 16 November 1998 (age 27) Espoo, Finland
- Height: 6 ft 2 in (188 cm)
- Weight: 205 lb (93 kg; 14 st 9 lb)
- Position: Defence
- Shoots: Left
- SHL team Former teams: Luleå HF; Ässät; HIFK; Kiekko-Espoo
- NHL draft: 71st overall, 2017; Detroit Red Wings
- Playing career: 2020–present

Kasper Kotkansalo (born 16 November 1998) is a Finnish professional ice hockey defenceman for Luleå HF of the Swedish Hockey League (SHL). Kotkansalo played college hockey at Boston University. He was drafted 71st overall by the Detroit Red Wings in the 2017 NHL entry draft.

== Playing career ==
On 13 October 2016, Kotkansalo committed to play college ice hockey for Boston University during the 2017–18 season. During the 2016–17 season, Kotkansalo recorded one goal and 11 assists in 47 games for the Sioux Falls Stampede of the United States Hockey League (USHL). After the 2019–20 season was abruptly cancelled due to the COVID-19 pandemic, Kotkansalo returned to his native Finland to be with his family. He finished his career with two goals and 23 assists in 112 games for the Terriers.

On 2 August 2020, Kotkansalo announced he would not return to Boston University for his senior season, citing uncertainties with the COVID-19 pandemic, and would stay in his native Finland to play hockey. On 3 August 2020, Kotkansalo signed a one-year contract with Ässät of the Finnish Liiga. He made his professional debut for Ässät on 2 October 2020. He scored his first career goal on 28 November 2020.

After a lone season with Kiekko-Espoo, Kotkansalo left the Liiga following five years to sign a one-year contract with reigning Swedish champions, Luleå HF of the SHL, on 20 May 2025.

== Career statistics ==
			Regular season					Playoffs
Season	Team	League	GP	G	A	Pts	PIM	GP	G	A	Pts	PIM
2015–16	Espoo Blues	Jr. A	48	4	15	19	36	6	0	3	3	4
2016–17	Sioux Falls Stampede	USHL	47	1	11	12	43	—	—	—	—	—
2017–18	Boston University	HE	40	2	4	6	22	—	—	—	—	—
2018–19	Boston University	HE	38	0	11	11	16	—	—	—	—	—
2019–20	Boston University	HE	34	0	8	8	23	—	—	—	—	—
2020–21	Ässät	Liiga	58	3	9	12	56	—	—	—	—	—
2021–22	HIFK	Liiga	52	4	12	16	10	7	0	0	0	0
2022–23	HIFK	Liiga	24	1	6	7	6	—	—	—	—	—
2023–24	HIFK	Liiga	23	2	3	5	8	7	0	0	0	0
2024–25	Kiekko-Espoo	Liiga	56	2	16	18	36	5	0	0	0	0
Liiga totals			213	12	46	58	116	19	0	0	0	0

=== International ===
Year	Team	Event	Result	GP	G	A	Pts	PIM
2015	Finland	IH18	4th	5	0	0	0	4
2016	Finland	U18	1st place, gold medalist(s)	6	0	4	4	0
2018	Finland	WJC	6th	5	0	0	0	0
Junior totals				16	0	4	4	4
