= Sandis Smons =

Latvian ice hockey player (born 1999)

- Born: 19 May 1999 (age 26); Riga, Latvia
- Height: 5 ft 11 in (180 cm)
- Weight: 190 lb (86 kg; 13 st 8 lb)
- Position: Defence
- Shoots: Left
- SL team Former teams: HC La Chaux-de-Fonds; Genève-Servette HC
- National team: Latvia
- Playing career: 2019–present

Sandis Smons (born 19 May 1999) is a Latvian professional ice hockey defenceman for HC La Chaux-de-Fonds of the Swiss League (SL).

== Playing career ==
Smons made his professional debut with the Ticino Rockets of the Swiss League (SL) during the 2018–19 season, appearing in two games that season.

On 18 August 2019, Smons signed his first professional contract with Genève-Servette HC for the 2019–20 season. He was immediately loaned to HC Sierre of the SL to begin the 2019–20 season and was called up on 23 September, by Genève-Servette to replace injured Henrik Tömmernes.

== International play ==
Smons made his debut with Latvia senior team in 2020.

== Personal life ==
Smons moved to Geneva, Switzerland, at age 15 to play at junior level with Genève-Servette HC, which allowed him to play in the National League and in the Swiss League with a Swiss player licence. He is fluent in Latvian and French.
