= Adam Tilander =

Swedish ice hockey player (born 1998)

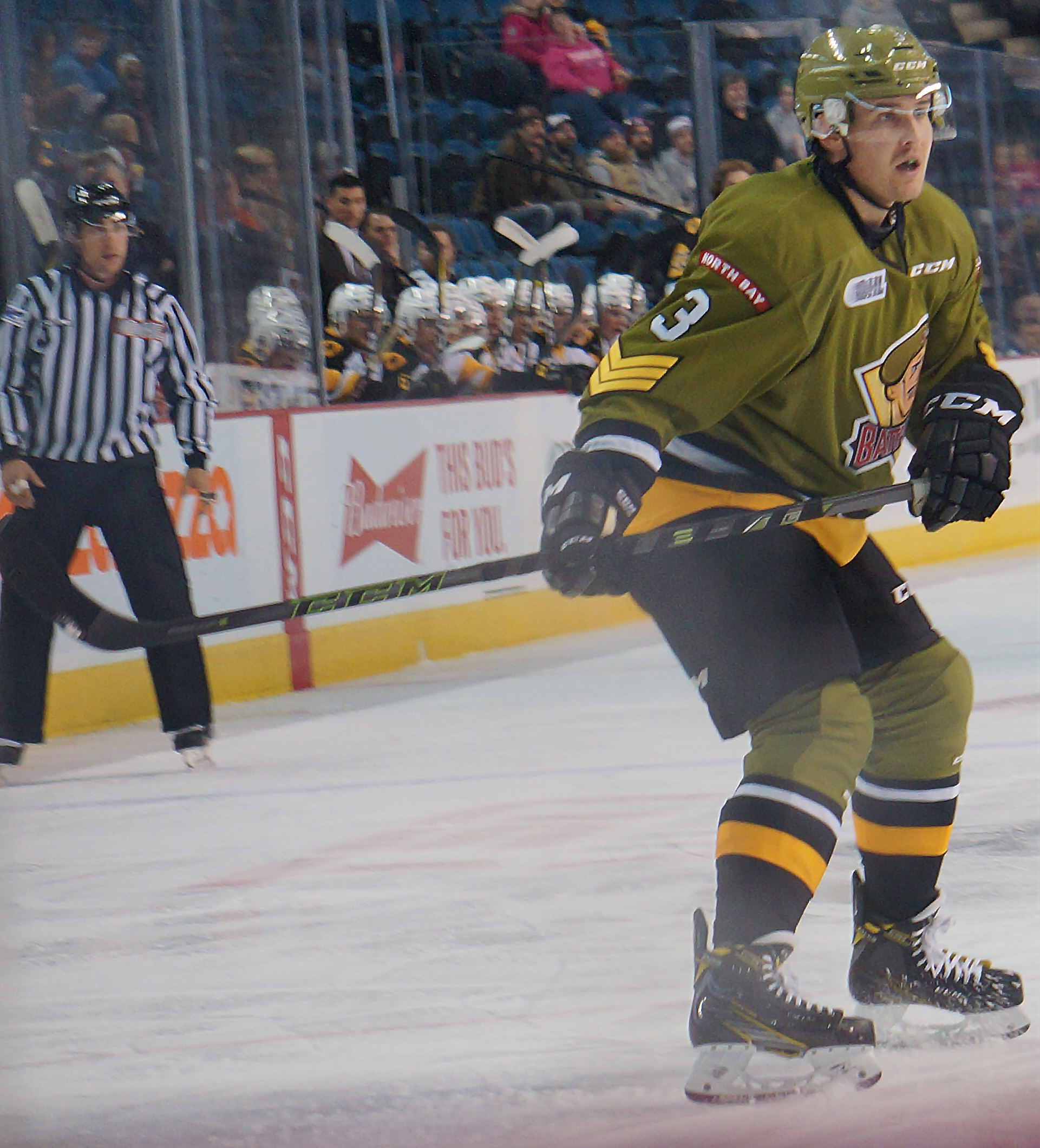
- Born: September 18, 1998 (age 27) Skövde, Sweden
- Height: 6 ft 0 in (183 cm)
- Weight: 192 lb (87 kg; 13 st 10 lb)
- Position: Defence
- Shoots: Right
- OHL team Former teams: North Bay Battalion; SHL; Skellefteå AIK
- Playing career: 2015–present

Adam Tilander (born September 18, 1998) is a Swedish ice hockey defenceman. He is currently playing with the North Bay Battalion of the Ontario Hockey League (OHL).

On February 14, 2015, Tilander made his Swedish Hockey League debut playing only one game with Skellefteå AIK during the 2014–15 SHL season.
