= Léo Chuard =

Swiss ice hockey player

- Born: September 10, 1998 (age 27) Geneva, Switzerland
- Height: 6 ft 2 in (188 cm)
- Weight: 200 lb (91 kg; 14 st 4 lb)
- Position: Goaltender
- Caught: Left
- Played for: HC La Chaux-de-Fonds; Genève-Servette HC
- NHL draft: Undrafted
- Playing career: 2016–2020

Léo Chuard is a Swiss former professional ice hockey goaltender who briefly played in the Swiss League (SL). He also appeared in one game with Genève-Servette HC of the National League (NL) during the 2015-16 season.

== Playing career ==
Chuard made his National League (NL) debut with Genève-Servette HC during the 2015-16 season, playing only 4 minutes in a single game. He never played for the team again before being loaned to HC La Chaux-de-Fonds of the Swiss League (SL) during the 2017-18 season. Chuard moved overseas to play the 2018/19 season with the Shreveport Mudbugs of the North American Hockey League (NAHL). He posted a .930 SVS% with a 2.38 GAA through 37 regular season games and a .936 SVS% in 10 playoffs games. Chuard started the 2019-20 season as a free agent before returning to Genève-Servette HC on December 16, 2019, agreeing to a one-year deal. On November 27, 2020, Chuard was loaned to the HCB Ticino Rockets of the Swiss League (SL) until the end of the year.

== Personal life ==
Chuard was born and raised in Geneva, Switzerland and played all of his junior hockey with Genève-Servette HC's various junior teams.
