= 2014 World U-17 Hockey Challenge (November) =

Tournament details
- Host country: Canada
- Venue(s): 3 (in 2 host cities)
- Dates: November 2–8
- Teams: 8

Tournament statistics
- Games played: 22
- Scoring leader(s): (United States) Clayton Keller (13 points)

The 2014 World Under-17 Hockey Challenge was an ice hockey tournament held in Sarnia and Lambton Shores, Ontario, Canada, from November 2 to 8, 2014.

== Final standings ==
	Team
1st place, gold medalist(s)	Russia
2nd place, silver medalist(s)	United States
3rd place, bronze medalist(s)	Sweden
4	Finland
5	Canada White
6	Canada Red
7	Canada Black
8	Slovakia
