= 2018 World Junior Ice Hockey Championships =

2018 edition of the World Junior Ice Hockey Championships

2018 IIHF World Junior Championships

Tournament details
- Host country: United States
- Venue(s): KeyBank Center, HarborCenter, New Era Field (in 2 host cities)
- Dates: December 26, 2017 – January 5, 2018
- Teams: 10

Final positions
- Champions: Canada (17th title)
- Runners-up: Sweden
- Third place: United States
- Fourth place: Czech Republic

Tournament statistics
- Games played: 30
- Goals scored: 216 (7.2 per game)
- Attendance: 211,210 (7,040 per game)
- Scoring leader: (United States) Casey Mittelstadt (11 points)

Awards
- MVP: (United States) Casey Mittelstadt

The 2018 World Junior Ice Hockey Championship was the 42nd edition of the Ice Hockey World Junior Championship, and was hosted by the city of Buffalo, New York, at KeyBank Center and HarborCenter. It opened on December 26, 2017, and closed with the gold medal game on January 5, 2018. It was the sixth time that the United States has hosted the WJIHC, and the second time that Buffalo has done so, previously hosting in 2011.

A preliminary round game between Canada and the United States was played outdoors at New Era Field in nearby Orchard Park, New York on December 29, 2017. It was the second outdoor game held at any top-level IIHF world championship (the first being the opening game of the 2010 IIHF World Championship) and the first one held at a junior level.

== Top Division ==
=== Venues ===
2018 World Junior Ice Hockey Championships is located in the United States	Buffalo		Orchard Park
2018 World Junior Ice Hockey Championships is located in the United States	KeyBank Center; Capacity: 19,070	KeyBank Rink at HarborCenter; Capacity: 1,800	New Era Field; Capacity: 71,870

=== Host selection ===
On July 28, 2015, USA Hockey named the five initial finalists for hosting the event:

- Buffalo, New York
- Pittsburgh
- St. Louis
- Chicago
- Tampa, Florida

Chicago and Tampa were eliminated on September 15. Buffalo was chosen as the host site on December 3, with a formal announcement on December 4.

=== Match officials ===
The following officials were assigned by the International Ice Hockey Federation to officiate the 2018 World Junior Championship.

Referees

- (Latvia) Andris Ansons
- (Canada) Alexandre Garon
- (Denmark) Jacob Grumsen
- (Finland) Mikko Kaukokari
- (Russia) Artur Kulev
- (Austria) Manuel Nikolic
- (Germany) Gordon Schukies
- (Czech Republic) Robin Šír
- (Sweden) Mikael Sjöqvist
- (United States) Stephen Thomson
- (United States) Jeremy Tufts
- (Switzerland) Marc Wiegand

Linesmen

- (Switzerland) Franco Castelli
- (Finland) Markus Hägerström
- (United States) William Hancock II
- (Denmark) Rene Jensen
- (Norway) Jon Kilian
- (Canada) Dustin McCrank
- (Czech Republic) Jiří Ondráček
- (Slovakia) Peter Šefčík
- (Russia) Alexander Sysuev
- (Sweden) Emil Yletyinen

=== Format ===
The preliminary round was a two group of five teams each internal round-robin format, followed by a three-round playoff. In the round-robin, two points were allotted for a win, and one additional point for a regulation win. One point was allotted for an overtime or game winning shots loss.

The four highest-ranked teams from each group of the preliminary round advanced to quarterfinals while the last-placed team from each group played a best-of-three series, the loser relegated to Division IA for 2019. All other teams will retain their Top Division status.

=== Preliminary round ===
All times are local. (Eastern Standard Time – UTC-5)

==== Group A ====
Pos	Team	Pld	W	OTW	OTL	L	GF	GA	GD	Pts	Qualification
1	Canada	4	3	0	1	0	21	6	+15	10	Quarterfinals
2	United States	4	2	1	0	1	20	10	+10	8	Quarterfinals
3	Finland	4	2	0	0	2	15	12	+3	6	Quarterfinals
4	Slovakia	4	2	0	0	2	10	14	−4	6	Quarterfinals
5	Denmark	4	0	0	0	4	2	26	−24	0	Relegation round

Source: IIHF

26 December 2017; 16:00	Canada	4–2 (3–1, 1–1, 0–0)	Finland	KeyBank Center; Attendance: 9,552

Game reference

Carter Hart
Goalies
Ukko-Pekka Luukkonen
Referees:
(Russia) Artur Kulev
(Austria) Manuel Nikolic
Linesmen:
(Norway) Jon Kilian
(Czech Republic) Jiří Ondráček

Katchouk (Thomas) – 05:34	1–0
Steel (Raddysh, Kyrou) (PP) – 06:01	2–0
	2–1	12:19 – Heponiemi (Välimäki)
Batherson (Gadjovich, Mete) – 12:52	3–1
	3–2	27:31 – Jokiharju (Tolvanen, Koivula) (PP)
Raddysh (Katchouk) – 32:47	4–2

12 min
Penalties
6 min
32
Shots
31

26 December 2017; 20:00	Denmark	0–9 (0–5, 0–2, 0–2)	United States	KeyBank Center; Attendance: 7,207

Game reference

Kasper Krog
Emil Gransøe
Goalies
Joseph Woll
Referees:
(Germany) Gordon Schukies
(Czech Republic) Robin Šír
Linesmen:
(Slovakia) Peter Šefčík
(Russia) Alexander Sysuev

0–1	02:27 – Jones (Peeke, Norris)
0–2	05:04 – Bellows (Brown) (PP)
0–3	08:26 – Mittelstadt (Hughes, M. Anderson)
0–4	11:35 – Yamamoto (Tkachuk, Hughes)
0–5	18:48 – Mittelstadt (Harper, Tufte)
0–6	24:08 – Bellows (PS)
0–7	39:31 – Harper (Fox)
0–8	52:30 – Peeke (Jones) (PP)
0–9	53:23 – Samberg (Perunovich, Norris)

10 min
Penalties
6 min
17
Shots
36

27 December 2017; 19:00	Slovakia	0–6 (0–1, 0–3, 0–2)	Canada	KeyBank Center; Attendance: 7,834

Game reference

Dávid Hrenák
Goalies
Colton Point
Referees:
(United States) Jeremy Tufts
(Switzerland) Marc Wiegand
Linesmen:
(United States) William Hancock II
(Denmark) Rene Jensen

0–1	03:39 – Steel (Makar, Kyrou)
0–2	21:24 – Kyrou (Mete, Dubé) (PP)
0–3	25:43 – Gadjovich (Makar)
0–4	30:33 – Raddysh (Kyrou, Steel) (PP)
0–5	55:58 – Comtois
0–6	58:30 – Gadjovich (McLeod, Timmins) (PP)

12 min
Penalties
4 min
20
Shots
52

28 December 2017; 12:00	Finland	4–1 (2–0, 2–1, 0–0)	Denmark	KeyBank Center; Attendance: 5,026

Game reference

Ukko-Pekka Luukkonen
Goalies
Kasper Krog
Referees:
(Latvia) Andris Ansons
(Canada) Alexandre Garon
Linesmen:
(Switzerland) Franco Castelli
(Norway) Jon Kilian

Koppanen (Välimäki, Heiskanen) – 02:49	1–0
Räsänen (Tolvanen, Jokiharju) – 06:56	2–0
	2–1	21:38 – Krag (Røndbjerg, Setkov) (PP)
Välimäki (Heiskanen, Vaakanainen) – 35:38	3–1
Jokiharju (Koivula) – 37:44	4–1

2 min
Penalties
14 min
62
Shots
7

28 December 2017; 20:00	United States	2–3 (0–0, 1–1, 1–2)	Slovakia	KeyBank Center; Attendance: 8,188

Game reference

Joseph Woll
Goalies
Roman Durný
Referees:
(Russia) Artur Kulev
(Sweden) Mikael Sjöqvist
Linesmen:
(Finland) Markus Hägerström
(Sweden) Emil Yletyinen

	0–1	24:52 – Krivošík (Buček)
Tkachuk (Poehling, J. Anderson) – 31:07	1–1
	1–2	55:15 – Krivošík (Buček)
Mittelstadt – 56:49	2–2
	2–3	57:52 – Buček

2 min
Penalties
4 min
45
Shots
25

29 December 2017; 15:00	Canada	3–4 GWS (2–0, 1–1, 0–2) (OT: 0–0) (SO: 0–2)	United States	New Era Field; Attendance: 44,592

Game reference

Carter Hart
Goalies
Jake Oettinger
Referees:
(Finland) Mikko Kaukokari
(Switzerland) Marc Wiegand
Linesmen:
(Czech Republic) Jiří Ondráček
(Russia) Alexander Sysuev

Makar (Thomas) (PP) – 04:13	1–0
Dubé (Steel) (PP) – 15:17	2–0
	2–1	36:27 – Bellows (Mittelstadt, Oettinger) (PP2)
Katchouk (Bean) – 37:39	3–1
	3–2	46:09 – Perunovich (Mittelstadt) (PP)
	3–3	46:43 – Tkachuk (Mittelstadt)

Steel (miss)
Thomas (miss)
Raddysh (miss)
Batherson (miss)
Shootout
Bellows
Tkachuk
(miss) Mittelstadt
12 min
Penalties
6 min
22
Shots
36

30 December 2017; 16:00	Finland	5–2 (0–0, 2–1, 3–1)	Slovakia	KeyBank Center; Attendance: 6,229

Game reference

Ukko-Pekka Luukkonen
Goalies
Roman Durný
Referees:
(Germany) Gordon Schukies
(United States) Stephen Thomson
Linesmen:
(Canada) Dustin McCrank
(Czech Republic) Jiří Ondráček

Koppanen (Nurmi, Jääskä) – 27:02	1–0
	1–1	34:14 – Bodák (Tamáši, Ivan)
Räsänen (Juolevi, Tolvanen) (PP) – 39:02	2–1
Heponiemi (Kuokkanen) – 46:23	3–1
	3–2	49:03 – Buček (Krivošík, Ružička)
Ikonen – 52:36	4–2
Nurmi (Koppanen) – 54:01	5–2

8 min
Penalties
8 min
39
Shots
26

30 December 2017; 20:00	Denmark	0–8 (0–3, 0–2, 0–3)	Canada	KeyBank Center; Attendance: 8,671

Game reference

Emil Gransøe
Goalies
Carter Hart
Referees:
(Austria) Manuel Nikolic
(Sweden) Mikael Sjöqvist
Linesmen:
(Slovakia) Peter Šefčík
(Sweden) Emil Yletyinen

0–1	03:52 – Thomas (Raddysh, Katchouk)
0–2	17:21 – Howden (Comtois, Foote)
0–3	19:39 – Steel (Clague, Kyrou)
0–4	27:52 – Makar (Bean) (PP)
0–5	29:20 – Howden (Foote, Formenton)
0–6	43:30 – Formenton (Timmins)
0–7	49:03 – McLeod
0–8	52:26 – Batherson (Foote, McLeod) (PP)

8 min
Penalties
4 min
18
Shots
44

31 December 2017; 16:00	United States	5–4 (2–0, 2–2, 1–2)	Finland	KeyBank Center; Attendance: 7,884

Game reference

Joseph Woll
Goalies
Ukko-Pekka Luukkonen
Referees:
(Canada) Alexandre Garon
(Czech Republic) Robin Šír
Linesmen:
(Denmark) Rene Jensen
(Slovakia) Peter Šefčík

Frederic (Tufte, Yamamoto) – 03:59	1–0
Mittelstadt (Tkachuk) – 14:33	2–0
J. Anderson (Tkachuk, Fox) (PP2) – 26:56	3–0
	3–1	29:01 – Räsänen (Tolvanen)
	3–2	38:44 – Tolvanen (Jokiharju, Vesalainen) (PP)
J. Anderson (Fox, Mittelstadt) (PP) – 39:26	4–2
	4–3	48:25 – Koppanen (Nurmi, Vaakanainen) (SH)
	4–4	49:31 – Vesalainen (Juolevi, Välimäki)
Fox (Mittelstadt, Tkachuk) – 58:23	5–4

8 min
Penalties
10 min
37
Shots
24

31 December 2017; 18:00	Slovakia	5–1 (1–1, 2–0, 2–0)	Denmark	HarborCenter; Attendance: 1,419

Game reference

Roman Durný
Goalies
Kasper Krog
Referees:
(Latvia) Andris Ansons
(United States) Jeremy Tufts
Linesmen:
(Switzerland) Franco Castelli
(Russia) Alexander Sysuev

	0–1	04:46 – Blichfield (Krag, Røndbjerg) (PP)
Roman (Tamáši) – 11:42	1–1
Fehérváry (Ružička, Buček) – 29:38	2–1
Roman (SH) – 34:38	3–1
Buček (Fehérváry) – 44:06	4–1
Liška (Kundrík, Solenský) – 45:22	5–1

12 min
Penalties
10 min
40
Shots
31

==== Group B ====
Pos	Team	Pld	W	OTW	OTL	L	GF	GA	GD	Pts	Qualification
1	Sweden	4	3	1	0	0	20	7	+13	11	Quarterfinals
2	Czech Republic	4	3	0	0	1	18	15	+3	9	Quarterfinals
3	Russia	4	2	0	1	1	17	13	+4	7	Quarterfinals
4	Switzerland	4	1	0	0	3	10	20	−10	3	Quarterfinals
5	Belarus	4	0	0	0	4	10	20	−10	0	Relegation round

Source: IIHF

26 December 2017; 12:00	Czech Republic	5–4 (2–2, 2–0, 1–2)	Russia	KeyBank Center; Attendance: 4,998

Game reference

Josef Kořenář
Goalies
Alexei Melnichuk
Vladislav Sukhachyov
Referees:
(Latvia) Andris Ansons
(Canada) Alexandre Garon
Linesmen:
(Switzerland) Franco Castelli
(Finland) Markus Hägerström

Nečas (Kaut, Zadina) (PP) – 04:42	1–0
	1–1	05:21 – Polodyan (Altybarmakyan, Zaitsev)
Safin (Chytil, Hájek) – 07:28	2–1
	2–2	09:16 – Sholokhov (Kostin, Syomin)
Zadina (Kaut, Nečas) (PP) – 25:34	3–2
Chytil (Safin, Zachar) – 37:26	4–2
Král (Kaut, Galvas) – 46:16	5–2
	5–3	57:48 – Kayumov (Maunkyan, Rubstov)
	5–4	59:02 – Syomin (Kayumov, Rubstov) (EA)

14 min
Penalties
6 min
24
Shots
38

26 December 2017; 14:00	Belarus	1–6 (1–1, 0–3, 0–2)	Sweden	HarborCenter; Attendance: 1,754

Game reference

Andrei Grishenko
Goalies
Filip Gustavsson
Referees:
(Denmark) Jacob Grumsen
(Finland) Mikko Kaukokari
Linesmen:
(United States) William Hancock II
(Denmark) Rene Jensen

	0–1	08:44 – Pettersson (Dahlin) (PP)
Sharangovich (SH) – 14:56	1–1
	1–2	30:57 – Brännström (Nylander, Steen)
	1–3	32:33 – Gustafsson (G. Lindström, Sellgren)
	1–4	34:18 – Boqvist (Brännström, Karlström)
	1–5	42:17 – Andersson (Nylander, Pettersson) (PP)
	1–6	51:07 – Andersson (Dahlin, Karlström)

16 min
Penalties
8 min
9
Shots
36

27 December 2017; 15:00	Switzerland	3–2 (1–1, 0–0, 2–1)	Belarus	KeyBank Center; Attendance: 5,224

Game reference

Philip Wüthrich
Goalies
Andrei Grishenko
Referees:
(Sweden) Mikael Sjöqvist
(United States) Stephen Thomson
Linesmen:
(Canada) Dustin McCrank
(Sweden) Emil Yletyinen

Müller – 08:07	1–0
	1–1	18:34 – Sushko (Martynyuk, Gabrus)
	1–2	44:25 – Bovbel (Litvinov, Sushko) (PP)
Nussbaumer (Luenberger) – 48:12	2–2
Kurashev (Maillard, Miranda) – 51:16	3–2

4 min
Penalties
2 min
39
Shots
29

28 December 2017; 14:00	Russia	5–2 (1–0, 1–1, 3–1)	Switzerland	HarborCenter; Attendance: 1,895

Game reference

Vladislav Sukhachyov
Goalies
Philip Wüthrich
Referees:
(Denmark) Jacob Grumsen
(United States) Jeremy Tufts
Linesmen:
(Czech Republic) Jiří Ondráček
(Slovakia) Peter Šefčík

Syomin (Sokolov) (PP) – 10:21	1–0
	1–1	20:09 – Miranda (Kurashev, Maillard)
Kostin (Svechnikov, Syomin) – 38:16	2–1
	2–2	42:10 – Jäger (Heim, Sigrist)
Kayumov (Kostin) – 51:02	3–2
Ivanov (Svechnikov) – 58:18	4–2
Abramov (Sokolov) (ENG) – 58:31	5–2

6 min
Penalties
8 min
37
Shots
13

28 December 2017; 16:00	Sweden	3–1 (2–0, 0–1, 1–0)	Czech Republic	KeyBank Center; Attendance: 6,890

Game reference

Filip Gustavsson
Goalies
Jakub Škarek
Referees:
(United States) Filip Larsson
(Switzerland) Marc Wiegand
Linesmen:
(Canada) Dustin McCrank
(Russia) Alexander Sysuev

Davidsson (Fjällby, Gustafsson) – 05:56	1–0
Pettersson (Nylander, Dahlin) (PP) – 19:04	2–0
	2–1	39:02 – Zadina (Nečas, Hájek) (PP)
Nylander (Dahlin) (PP) – 44:25	3–1

10 min
Penalties
8 min
35
Shots
25

29 December 2017; 12:00	Belarus	2–5 (0–2, 0–1, 2–2)	Russia	HarborCenter; Attendance: 1,841

Game reference

Andrei Grishenko
Goalies
Vladislav Sukhachyov
Referees:
(Austria) Manuel Nikolic
(Germany) Gordon Schukies
Linesmen:
(United States) William Hancock II
(Norway) Jon Kilian

	0–1	10:14 – Polodyan (Makeyev, Maltsev)
	0–2	12:44 – Rubtsov (Manukyan, Minulin)
	0–3	23:33 – Kostin (Svechnikov)
Deryabin (Pishuk) – 42:03	1–3
	1–4	44:21 – Kayumov (Rubtsov, Manukyan)
	1–5	48:12 – Kostin (Svechnikov, Ivanov)
Pishuk (Martynov) – 50:43	2–5

6 min
Penalties
10 min
19
Shots
40

30 December 2017; 12:00	Czech Republic	6–5 (0–1, 5–2, 1–2)	Belarus	KeyBank Center; Attendance: 5,222

Game reference

Josef Kořenář
Jakub Škarek
Goalies
Andrei Grishenko
Dmitri Rodik
Referees:
(Denmark) Jacob Grumsen
(Russia) Artur Kulev
Linesmen:
(Switzerland) Franco Castelli
(Denmark) Rene Jensen

	0–1	08:31 – Sharangovich (Yeryomenko, Litvinov) (PP)
	0–2	20:48 – Drozdov (Sushko, Bovbel)
Pavlík (Safin, Reichel) – 21:29	1–2
Hájek (Nečas, Budík) – 21:53	2–2
Zadina (Michnáč, Kaut) (PP) – 25:58	3–2
Chytil (Zachar, Hájek) – 32:45	4–2
Pavlík (Chytil) – 35:26	5–2
	5–3	38:45 – Sharangovich (Sushko, Bovbel) (PP)
	5–4	50:27 – Martynov (Drozdov, Yeryomenko) (PP)
Zachar (Budík) – 53:23	6–4
	6–5	54:52 – Gabrus

41 min
Penalties
4 min
39
Shots
21

30 December 2017; 14:00	Sweden	7–2 (1–1, 2–1, 4–0)	Switzerland	HarborCenter; Attendance: 2,115

Game reference

Filip Larsson
Goalies
Matteo Ritz
Referees:
(Latvia) Andris Ansons
(Czech Republic) Robin Šír
Linesmen:
(Finland) Markus Hägerström
(United States) William Hancock II

Andersson (Nylander, Pettersson) (PP) – 05:25	1–0
	1–1	10:13 – Müller
Andersson – 26:07	2–1
Fjällby (SH) – 32:27	3–1
	3–2	39:14 – Miranda (PP)
Pettersson – 44:55	4–2
Söderlund (Dahlin, Brännström) – 50:01	5–2
Zetterlund – 51:43	6–2
Pettersson (Andersson, Dahlin) – 52:17	7–2

6 min
Penalties
8 min
42
Shots
22

31 December 2017; 12:00	Switzerland	3–6 (1–2, 2–2, 0–2)	Czech Republic	KeyBank Center; Attendance: 5,548

Game reference

Philip Wüthrich
Goalies
Jakub Škarek
Josef Kořenář
Referees:
(Finland) Mikko Kaukokari
(Sweden) Mikael Sjöqvist
Linesmen:
(Norway) Jon Kilian
(Sweden) Emil Yletyinen

	0–1	02:38 – Lauko (Hájek, Budík)
Jäger (Miranda, Kurashev) – 02:51	1–1
	1–2	11:07 – Nečas (Kaut, Hájek) (PP)
	1–3	22:11 – Reichel (Pavlík)
Rohrbach – 22:20	2–3
Riva (le Coultre, Heim) (PP) – 23:55	3–3
	3–4	28:38 – Kaut (Michnáč, Nečas) (PP)
	3–5	47:46 – Kurovský (Kodýtek)
	3–6	57:40 – Reichel (Kurovský)

4 min
Penalties
8 min
31
Shots
60

31 December 2017; 20:00	Russia	3–4 GWS (2–2, 0–0, 1–1) (OT: 0–0) (SO: 1–2)	Sweden	KeyBank Center; Attendance: 6,121

Game reference

Vladislav Sukhachyov
Goalies
Filip Gustavsson
Referees:
(Germany) Gordon Schukies
(United States) Stephen Thomson
Linesmen:
(Finland) Markus Hägerström
(Canada) Dustin McCrank

	0–1	07:18 – Andersson (Liljegren, Nylander)
Sokolov (Maltsev, Polodyan) – 15:09	1–1
	1–2	17:32 – Liljegren (Söderlund, L. Lindström)
Kostin (Ivanov, Svechnikov) – 18:18	2–2
	2–3	54:21 – Gustafsson (Fjällby, Davidsson)
Polodyan (Shepelev, Ivanov) – 56:15	3–3

Yelizarov (miss)
Abramov
Maltsev (miss)
Kostin (miss)
Kayumov (miss)
Shootout
(miss) Pettersson
(miss) Nylander
L. Lindström
Steen
12 min
Penalties
8 min
31
Shots
43

=== Relegation round ===
January 2, 2018; 14:00	Belarus	4–5 (0–2, 2–0, 2–3)	Denmark	HarborCenter; Attendance: 1,245

Game reference

Andrei Grishenko
Goalies
Kasper Krog
Referees:
(Germany) Gordon Schukies
(Switzerland) Marc Wiegand
Linesmen:
(Switzerland) Franco Castelli
(Finland) Markus Hägerström

	0–1	15:56 – Røndbjerg (Blichfeld)
	0–2	16:48 – Schultz (Madsen, Grundtvig)
Litvinov (SH) – 21:01	1–2
Yeryomenko (Sushko, Sharangovich) (PP) – 29:13	2–2
Drozdov (SH) – 41:44	3–2
Martynov (Sushko, Sharangovich) (PP) – 48:30	4–2
	4–3	49:04 – Blichfeld (Røndbjerg, Jessen)
	4–4	59:26 – Blichfeld (Setkov) (EA)
	4–5	59:45 – Grundtvig (Røndbjerg, Mogensen)

20 min
Penalties
14 min
28
Shots
29

January 4, 2018; 12:00	Denmark	3–2 GWS (2–0, 0–0, 0–2) (OT: 0–0) (SO: 4–2)	Belarus	KeyBank Center; Attendance: 4,295

Game reference

Kasper Krog
Goalies
Andrei Grishenko
Dmitri Rodik
Referees:
(Latvia) Andris Ansons
(Canada) Alexandre Garon
Linesmen:
(United States) William Hancock II
(Sweden) Emil Yletyinen

Nielsen (Blichfeld, Røndbjerg) – 10:47	1–0
Røndbjerg (Blichfeld, Schmidt-Svestrup) – 12:23	2–0
	2–1	48:54 – Sushko (Yeryomenko) (PP2)
	2–2	49:40 – Litvinov (Bovbel, Sushko) (PP)

Molge (miss)
Grundtvig
Andersen
Schmidt-Svejstrup
Røndbjerg
Shootout
Drozdov
(miss) Sharangovich
Mikhalchuk
(miss) Martynov
10 min
Penalties
33 min
28
Shots
30

Note: Belarus was relegated to the 2019 Division I A

=== Playoff round ===
==== Bracket ====
Quarterfinals
1B	Sweden	3
4A	Slovakia	2
2A	United States	4
3B	Russia	2
1A	Canada	8
4B	Switzerland	2
2B	Czech Republic (GWS)	4
3A	Finland	3

Semifinals
1B	Sweden	4
2A	United States	2
1A	Canada	7
2B	Czech Republic	2

Final
1B	Sweden	1
1A	Canada	3
Third place
2B	Czech Republic	3
2A	United States	9

==== Quarterfinals ====
2 January 2018; 12:00	Czech Republic	4–3 GWS (1–0, 1–2, 1–1) (OT: 0–0) (SO: 2–1)	Finland	KeyBank Center; Attendance: 5,109

Game reference

Josef Kořenář
Goalies
Ukko-Pekka Luukkonen
Referees:
(United States) Stephen Thomson
(United States) Jeremy Tufts
Linesmen:
(Norway) Jon Kilian
(Sweden) Emil Yletyinen

Zadina (Nečas, Hájek) (PP) – 06:20	1–0
	1–1	23:04 – Räsänen (Vesalainen, Juolevi) (PP)
	1–2	29:53 – Juolevi (Vesalainen, Kuokkanen)
Reichel (Pavlík, Budík) – 34:17	2–2
	2–3	46:30 – Vesalainen (Tolvanen)
Zadina (Galvas, Nečas) (EA) – 57:34	3–3

Reichel
Zadina (miss)
Nečas
Kaut (miss)
Zachar (miss)
Shootout
(miss) Räsänen
(miss) Tolvanen
(miss) Kuokkanen
Vesalainen
(miss) Juolevi
8 min
Penalties
4 min
30
Shots
54

2 January 2018; 16:00	Canada	8–2 (3–0, 3–1, 2–1)	Switzerland	KeyBank Center; Attendance: 5,533

Game reference

Carter Hart
Goalies
Philip Wüthrich
Matteo Ritz
Referees:
(Denmark) Jacob Grumsen
(Sweden) Mikael Sjöqvist
Linesmen:
(Denmark) Rene Jensen
(Russia) Alexander Sysuev

Howden (Comtois, Makar) – 00:48	1–0
Makar (Timmins, Comtois) – 08:29	2–0
Batherson (Katchouk, Thomas) (PP) – 12:06	3–0
Batherson (Howden) – 26:12	4–0
Kyrou (Steel) – 27:24	5–0
	5–1	28:46 – Rohrbach (Le Coultre, Maillard)
Timmins (Steenbergen, Howden) – 32:19	6–1
	6–2	50:26 – Simic (Maillard) (SH)
Dubé (Kyrou, Raddysh) (PP) – 51:12	7–2
Comtois (Howden) – 59:09	8–2

6 min
Penalties
8 min
60
Shots
15

2 January 2018; 18:00	Sweden	3–2 (0–0, 2–1, 1–1)	Slovakia	HarborCenter; Attendance: 1,445

Game reference

Philip Larsson
Goalies
Roman Durný
Referees:
(Canada) Alexandre Garon
(Austria) Manuel Nkolic
Linesmen:
(United States) William Hancock II
(Czech Republic) Jiří Ondráček

Lundeström (Söderlund) – 20:09	1–0
Zetterlund – 26:55	2–0
	2–1	37:41 – Bodák (Čacho, Buček) (PP)
Lundeström (Söderlund, Steen) – 50:17	3–1
	3–2	51:58 – Bodák (Kelemen, Smolka)

10 min
Penalties
4 min
39
Shots
22

2 January 2018; 20:00	United States	4–2 (2–1, 0–0, 2–1)	Russia	KeyBank Center; Attendance: 6,242

Game reference

Joseph Woll
Goalies
Vladislav Sukhachyov
Referees:
(Finland) Mikko Kaukokari
(Czech Republic) Robin Šír
Linesmen:
(Canada) Dustin McCrank
(Slovakia) Peter Šefčík

Bellows (Tkachuk, Fox) (PP) – 02:18	1–0
	1–1	10:32 – Sholokhov (Kostin, Yelizarov)
Yamamoto (Mittelstadt, Samberg) – 14:34	2–1
	2–2	43:39 – Altybarmakyan (Samorukov)
Bellows (Samberg) – 52:31	3–2
J. Anderson (Poehling, Lindgren) (ENG) – 59:18	4–2

8 min
Penalties
33 min
43
Shots
29

==== Semifinals ====
4 January 2018; 16:00	Sweden	4–2 (0–0, 1–0, 3–2)	United States	KeyBank Center; Attendance: 7,524

Game reference

Filip Gustavsson
Goalies
Joseph Woll
Jake Oettinger
Referees:
(Austria) Manuel Nikolic
(Switzerland) Marc Wiegand
Linesmen:
(Denmark) Rene Jensen
(Slovakia) Peter Šefčík

Pettersson (Nylander, L. Lindström) (PP) – 33:30	1–0
Andersson (Karlström) – 46:17	2–0
Steen (SH) – 47:47	3–0
Fjällby (Davidsson) (SH) – 48:25	4–0
	4–1	52:24 – Bellows (Yamamoto) (PP)
	4–2	56:59 – Tkachuk (J. Anderson) (EA)

16 min
Penalties
8 min
20
Shots
31

4 January 2018; 20:00	Canada	7–2 (2–1, 4–0, 1–1)	Czech Republic	KeyBank Center; Attendance: 6,941

Game reference

Carter Hart
Goalies
Josef Kořenář
Jakub Škarek
Referees:
(Germany) Gordon Schukies
(United States) Jeremy Tufts
Linesmen:
(Finland) Markus Hägerström
(Norway) Jon Kilian

	0–1	05:55 – Zadina (Nečas, Michnáč)
Steel (Clague, Kyrou) (PP) – 15:05	1–1
Batherson (Makar, Thomas) (PP) – 18:08	2–1
Batherson (Makar, Bean) (PP) – 27:48	3–1
Comtois (Howden, Formenton) – 29:43	4–1
Kyrou (Steel, Dubé) – 32:15	5–1
Batherson (McLeod) – 36:58	6–1
Katchouk (Thomas) – 45:15	7–1
	7–2	50:11 – Zadina (Budík)

10 min
Penalties
8 min
39
Shots
20

==== Bronze medal game ====
5 January 2018; 16:00	Czech Republic	3–9 (0–1, 0–6, 3–2)	United States	KeyBank Center; Attendance: 7,122

Game reference

Josef Kořenář
Jakub Škarek
Goalies
Jake Oettinger
Jeremy Swayman
Referees:
(Germany) Gordon Schukies
(Sweden) Mikael Sjöqvist
Linesmen:
(Norway) Jon Kilian
(Canada) Dustin McCrank

	0–1	19:56 – Frederic (SH)
	0–2	20:09 – Poehling (J. Anderson, Perunovich) (SH)
	0–3	24:18 – J. Anderson (Tkachuk, Mittelstadt)
	0–4	25:52 – Frederic (Hughes, Tufte)
	0–5	27:23 – Bellows (PS)
	0–6	32:55 – Frederic
	0–7	39:01 – Bellows (Norris)
Kaut (Hájek, Nečas) (PP) – 40:43	1–7
Pavlík (Kodýtek, Vála) – 42:11	2–7
	2–8	45:41 – Frederic (Bellows, Harper) (PP)
Kurovský (Kodýtek, Pavlík) – 47:45	3–8
	3–9	57:10 – Harper (Samberg)

4 min
Penalties
8 min
35
Shots
39

==== Final ====
5 January 2018; 20:00	Sweden	1–3 (0–0, 1–1, 0–2)	Canada	KeyBank Center; Attendance: 17,544

Game reference

Filip Gustavsson
Goalies
Carter Hart
Referees:
(Finland) Mikko Kaukokari
(Czech Republic) Robin Šir
Linesmen:
(Czech Republic) Jiří Ondráček
(Slovakia) Peter Šefčík

	0–1	21:49 – Dubé (Kyrou, Steel)
Söderlund (L. Lindström, Brännström) (SH) – 33:07	1–1
	1–2	58:20 – Steenbergen (Timmins)
	1–3	58:46 – Formenton (Mete) (ENG)

22 min
Penalties
2 min
36
Shots
28

=== Statistics ===
==== Scoring leaders ====
Pos	Player	Country	GP	G	A	Pts	+/−	PIM
1	Casey Mittelstadt	United States	7	4	7	11	+8	2
2	Martin Nečas	Czech Republic	7	3	8	11	−5	0
3	Kieffer Bellows	United States	7	9	1	10	+2	4
4	Jordan Kyrou	Canada	7	3	7	10	+2	0
5	Sam Steel	Canada	7	4	5	9	+3	0
6	Brady Tkachuk	United States	7	3	6	9	+6	2
7	Filip Zadina	Czech Republic	7	7	1	8	-4	2
8	Klim Kostin	Russia	5	5	3	8	+7	2
9	Cale Makar	Canada	7	3	5	8	+5	0
10	Maxim Sushko	Belarus	6	2	6	8	−1	4

GP = Games played; G = Goals; A = Assists; Pts = Points; +/− = Plus–minus; PIM = Penalties in minutes
Source: IIHF

==== Goaltending leaders ====
(minimum 40% team's total ice time)

Pos	Player	Country	TOI	GA	GAA	Sv%	SO
1	Carter Hart	Canada	365:00	11	1.81	92.95	1
2	Roman Durný	Slovakia	240:00	11	2.75	92.86	0
3	Filip Gustavsson	Sweden	364:36	11	1.81	92.41	0
4	Vladislav Sukhachyov	Russia	262:30	12	2.74	90.40	0
5	Philip Wüthrich	Switzerland	207:22	17	4.92	88.74	0

TOI = Time On Ice (minutes:seconds); GA = Goals against; GAA = Goals against average; Sv% = Save percentage; SO = Shutouts
Source: IIHF

=== Tournament awards ===
Most Valuable Player

(United States) Casey Mittelstadt

All-star team

- Goaltender: (Sweden) Filip Gustavsson
- Defencemen: (Sweden) Rasmus Dahlin, (Canada) Cale Makar
- Forwards: (United States) Casey Mittelstadt, (Czech Republic) Filip Zadina, (United States) Kieffer Bellows

IIHF best player awards

- Goaltender: (Sweden) Filip Gustavsson
- Defenceman: (Sweden) Rasmus Dahlin
- Forward: (United States) Casey Mittelstadt

=== Final standings ===
Pos	Grp	Team	Pld	W	OTW	OTL	L	GF	GA	GD	Pts	Final result
1	A	Canada	7	6	0	1	0	39	11	+28	19	Champions
2	B	Sweden	7	5	1	0	1	28	14	+14	17	Runners-up
3	A	United States (H)	7	4	1	0	2	35	19	+16	14	Third place
4	B	Czech Republic	7	3	1	0	3	27	34	−7	11	Fourth place
5	B	Russia	5	2	0	1	2	19	17	+2	7	Eliminated in Quarter-finals
6	A	Finland	5	2	0	1	2	18	16	+2	7	Eliminated in Quarter-finals
7	A	Slovakia	5	2	0	0	3	12	17	−5	6	Eliminated in Quarter-finals
8	B	Switzerland	5	1	0	0	4	12	28	−16	3	Eliminated in Quarter-finals
9	A	Denmark	6	1	1	0	4	10	32	−22	5	Advanced in Relegation round
10	B	Belarus	6	0	0	1	5	16	28	−12	1	Relegated to the 2019 Division I A

Source: IIHF
(H) Host

== Division I ==
=== Division I A ===
The Division I A tournament was played in Courchevel and Méribel, France, from December 10 to 16, 2017.

Pos	Team	Pld	W	OTW	OTL	L	GF	GA	GD	Pts	Promotion or relegation
1	Kazakhstan	5	3	2	0	0	20	10	+10	13	Promoted to the 2019 Top Division
2	Latvia	5	3	1	1	0	13	5	+8	12	
3	Germany	5	3	0	1	1	17	7	+10	10	
4	France (H)	5	1	1	1	2	11	15	−4	6	
5	Austria	5	1	0	0	4	10	20	−10	3	
6	Hungary	5	0	0	1	4	11	25	−14	1	Relegated to the 2019 Division I B

Source: IIHF
Rules for classification: 1) points; 2) head-to-head points; 3) head-to-head goal difference; 4) head-to-head number of goals scored; 5) result against closest best-ranked team outside tied teams; 6) result against second-best ranked team outside tied teams; 7) seeding before tournament.
(H) Host

=== Division I B ===
The Division I B tournament was played in Bled, Slovenia, from December 9 to 15, 2017.

Pos	Team	Pld	W	OTW	OTL	L	GF	GA	GD	Pts	Promotion or relegation
1	Norway	5	3	2	0	0	18	5	+13	13	Promoted to the 2019 Division I A
2	Poland	5	3	1	1	0	23	14	+9	12	
3	Slovenia (H)	5	3	0	1	1	18	15	+3	10	
4	Ukraine	5	1	1	1	2	9	11	−2	6	
5	Italy	5	0	1	0	4	9	23	−14	2 (Note: Italy defeated Lithuania 2–1)	
6	Lithuania	5	0	0	2	3	7	16	−9	2	Relegated to the 2019 Division II A

Source: IIHF
Rules for classification: 1) points; 2) head-to-head points; 3) head-to-head goal difference; 4) head-to-head number of goals scored; 5) result against closest best-ranked team outside tied teams; 6) result against second-best ranked team outside tied teams; 7) seeding before tournament.
(H) Host

== Division II ==
=== Division II A ===
The Division II A tournament was played in Dumfries, United Kingdom, from December 10 to 16, 2017.

Pos	Team	Pld	W	OTW	OTL	L	GF	GA	GD	Pts	Promotion or relegation
1	Japan	5	4	1	0	0	23	7	+16	14	Promoted to the 2019 Division I B
2	South Korea	5	2	2	0	1	21	19	+2	10 (Note: South Korea defeated Great Britain 5–4)	
3	Great Britain (H)	5	3	0	1	1	23	15	+8	10	
4	Estonia	5	1	0	1	3	20	25	−5	4 (Note: Estonia defeated Romania 8–4)	
5	Romania	5	1	0	1	3	17	20	−3	4	
6	Netherlands	5	1	0	0	4	13	31	−18	3	Relegated to the 2019 Division II B

Source: IIHF
Rules for classification: 1) points; 2) head-to-head points; 3) head-to-head goal difference; 4) head-to-head number of goals scored; 5) result against closest best-ranked team outside tied teams; 6) result against second-best ranked team outside tied teams; 7) seeding before tournament.
(H) Host

=== Division II B ===
The Division II B tournament was played in Belgrade, Serbia, from January 10 to 16, 2018.

Pos	Team	Pld	W	OTW	OTL	L	GF	GA	GD	Pts	Promotion or relegation
1	Spain	5	4	1	0	0	26	8	+18	14	Promoted to the 2019 Division II A
2	Serbia (H)	5	4	0	1	0	22	12	+10	13	
3	Croatia	5	3	0	0	2	16	11	+5	9	
4	Belgium	5	1	0	0	4	22	28	−6	3 (Note: Belgium 3 Pts, +4 GD; Mexico 3 Pts, –1 GD; Turkey 3 Pts, –3 GD)	
5	Mexico	5	1	0	0	4	12	22	−10	3	
6	Turkey	5	1	0	0	4	13	30	−17	3	Relegated to the 2019 Division III

Source: IIHF
Rules for classification: 1) points; 2) head-to-head points; 3) head-to-head goal difference; 4) head-to-head number of goals scored; 5) result against closest best-ranked team outside tied teams; 6) result against second-best ranked team outside tied teams; 7) seeding before tournament.
(H) Host

== Division III ==
=== Main tournament ===
The Division III main tournament was played in Sofia, Bulgaria, from January 22 to 28, 2018.

Pos	Team	Pld	W	OTW	OTL	L	GF	GA	GD	Pts	Promotion
1	Israel	5	5	0	0	0	25	11	+14	15	Promoted to the 2019 Division II B
2	China	5	3	0	0	2	30	12	+18	9	
3	Bulgaria (H)	5	3	0	0	2	22	24	−2	9	
4	Iceland	5	2	0	1	2	20	15	+5	7	
5	Australia	5	1	1	0	3	18	24	−6	5	
6	New Zealand	5	0	0	0	5	11	40	−29	0	

Source: IIHF.com
Rules for classification: 1) points; 2) head-to-head points; 3) head-to-head goal difference; 4) head-to-head number of goals scored; 5) result against closest best-ranked team outside tied teams; 6) result against second-best ranked team outside tied teams; 7) seeding before tournament.
(H) Host

=== Qualification ===
The Division III qualification tournament was played in Cape Town, South Africa, from February 5 to 7, 2018.

Pos	Team	Pld	W	OTW	OTL	L	GF	GA	GD	Pts	Promotion
1	South Africa (H)	2	2	0	0	0	6	4	+2	6	Promoted to the 2019 Division III
2	Chinese Taipei	2	0	0	0	2	4	6	−2	0	Promoted to the 2019 Division III

Source: IIHF
Rules for classification: 1) points; 2) head-to-head points; 3) head-to-head goal difference; 4) head-to-head number of goals scored; 5) seeding before tournament.
(H) Host
