= Jonas Røndbjerg =

Danish ice hockey player (born 1999)

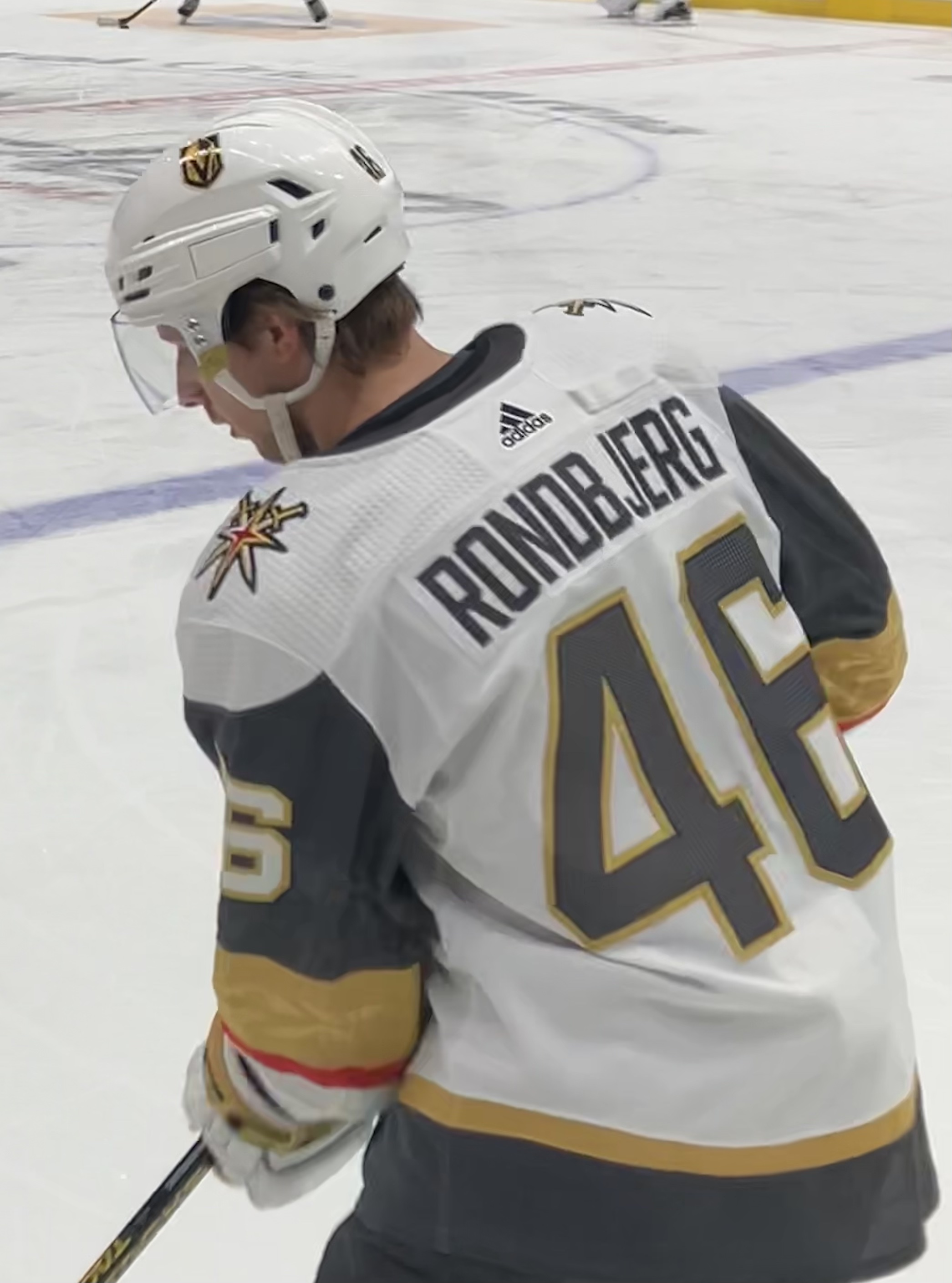
- Røndbjerg with the Vegas Golden Knights in 2023
- Born: 31 March 1999 (age 27) Hørsholm, Denmark
- Height: 6 ft 2 in (188 cm)
- Weight: 206 lb (93 kg; 14 st 10 lb)
- Position: Winger
- Shoots: Left
- NHL team (P) Cur. team Former teams: Vegas Golden Knights; Henderson Silver Knights (AHL); Rungsted Seier Capital; Växjö Lakers
- National team: Denmark
- NHL draft: 65th overall, 2017; Vegas Golden Knights
- Playing career: 2014–present

Jonas Røndbjerg (born 31 March 1999) is a Danish professional ice hockey player who is a winger for the Henderson Silver Knights of the American Hockey League (AHL) while under contract to the Vegas Golden Knights of the National Hockey League (NHL). At the 2017 NHL entry draft, Røndbjerg was selected 65th overall by the Golden Knights.

Internationally, Røndbjerg has represented Denmark at both the junior and senior levels, including four World Junior Championships, one World Championship, and the qualifiers for the 2026 Winter Olympics.

== Playing career ==
Røndbjerg made his professional debut playing in his native Denmark, with Rungsted Seier Capital in the Metal Ligaen during the 2014–15 season. In order to further his development, Røndbjerg moved to Sweden to join the Växjö Lakers of the Swedish Hockey League prior to the 2016–17 season.

During the 2017–18 season, Røndbjerg established personal best marks with 6 goals and 5 assists to finish with 11 points in 35 games with the Lakers. He returned the following season with the Lakers to contribute 4 goals and 6 points in 44 games during the 2018–19 campaign.

On 30 May 2019, Røndbjerg agreed to a three-year, entry-level contract with the Vegas Golden Knights.

As a restricted free agent, Røndbjerg signed a one-year extension with Vegas on 6 July 2025. Entering unrestricted free agency for the first time, Røndbjerg signed a further one-year extension with Vegas on 1 July 2026.

== International play ==
Røndbjerg made his fourth World Juniors Championships appearance for Denmark serving as Captain at the 2019 World Junior Championship. He posted 1 goal and 2 points in 6 games, unable to keep Denmark from returning to Division 1.

Røndbjerg made his senior team debut for Denmark in 2024 at the qualifiers for the 2026 Winter Olympics. Denmark won all three games and qualified for the tournament, with Røndbjerg scoring one goal. Following the Golden Knights' elimination from the 2025 Stanley Cup playoffs in May 2025, Røndbjerg joined Denmark at the Danish-hosted 2025 IIHF World Championship, scoring two goals in his tournament debut against Norway on 17 May. A month later, on 16 June, Røndbjerg was subsequently named one of the first six members of Denmark's roster for the 2026 Winter Olympics. However, he was ultimately ruled out due to injury shortly before the start of the tournament, and was replaced by Malte Setkov.

== Career statistics ==
=== Regular season and playoffs ===
			Regular season					Playoffs
Season	Team	League	GP	G	A	Pts	PIM	GP	G	A	Pts	PIM
2014–15	Rungsted Seier Capital	DEN	30	3	1	4	0	7	0	1	1	0
2015–16	Rungsted Seier Capital	DEN	35	10	4	14	6	4	1	1	2	2
2016–17	Växjö Lakers	J20	42	9	22	31	4	7	2	3	5	0
2016–17	Växjö Lakers	SHL	5	0	0	0	0	—	—	—	—	—
2017–18	Växjö Lakers	J20	1	0	0	0	0	4	1	4	5	0
2017–18	Växjö Lakers	SHL	35	6	5	11	4	—	—	—	—	—
2017–18	IF Troja/Ljungby	Allsv	5	1	0	1	2	3	0	0	0	0
2018–19	Växjö Lakers	SHL	45	2	4	6	6	5	0	0	0	0
2019–20	Chicago Wolves	AHL	1	0	0	0	0	—	—	—	—	—
2020–21	Rungsted Seier Capital	DEN	5	0	2	2	0	—	—	—	—	—
2020–21	Henderson Silver Knights	AHL	38	6	7	13	6	5	2	0	2	0
2021–22	Vegas Golden Knights	NHL	30	2	4	6	4	—	—	—	—	—
2021–22	Henderson Silver Knights	AHL	39	14	13	27	4	2	0	0	0	2
2022–23	Henderson Silver Knights	AHL	54	12	16	28	10	—	—	—	—	—
2022–23	Vegas Golden Knights	NHL	13	0	1	1	4	—	—	—	—	—
2023–24	Henderson Silver Knights	AHL	48	9	16	25	10	—	—	—	—	—
2023–24	Vegas Golden Knights	NHL	20	1	2	3	0	—	—	—	—	—
2024–25	Henderson Silver Knights	AHL	53	11	15	26	18	—	—	—	—	—
2024–25	Vegas Golden Knights	NHL	13	0	0	0	0	—	—	—	—	—
2025–26	Henderson Silver Knights	AHL	43	13	13	26	12	6	0	1	1	0
2025–26	Vegas Golden Knights	NHL	4	0	1	1	0	—	—	—	—	—
SHL totals			85	8	9	17	10	5	0	0	0	0
NHL totals			80	3	8	11	8	—	—	—	—	—

=== International ===
Year	Team	Event	Result	GP	G	A	Pts	PIM
2015	Denmark	U18-D1	11th	5	1	1	2	2
2016	Denmark	U18	10th	5	0	3	3	2
2016	Denmark	WJC	8th	5	0	1	1	2
2017	Denmark	U18-D1	13th	5	4	5	9	2
2017	Denmark	WJC	5th	5	0	2	2	0
2018	Denmark	WJC	9th	6	2	5	7	0
2019	Denmark	WJC	10th	6	1	1	2	0
2024	Denmark	OGQ	Q	3	1	0	1	0
2025	Denmark	WC	4th	5	2	0	2	0
Junior totals				37	8	18	26	8
Senior totals				8	3	0	3	0
