= Tim Söderlund =

Swedish ice hockey player (born 1998)

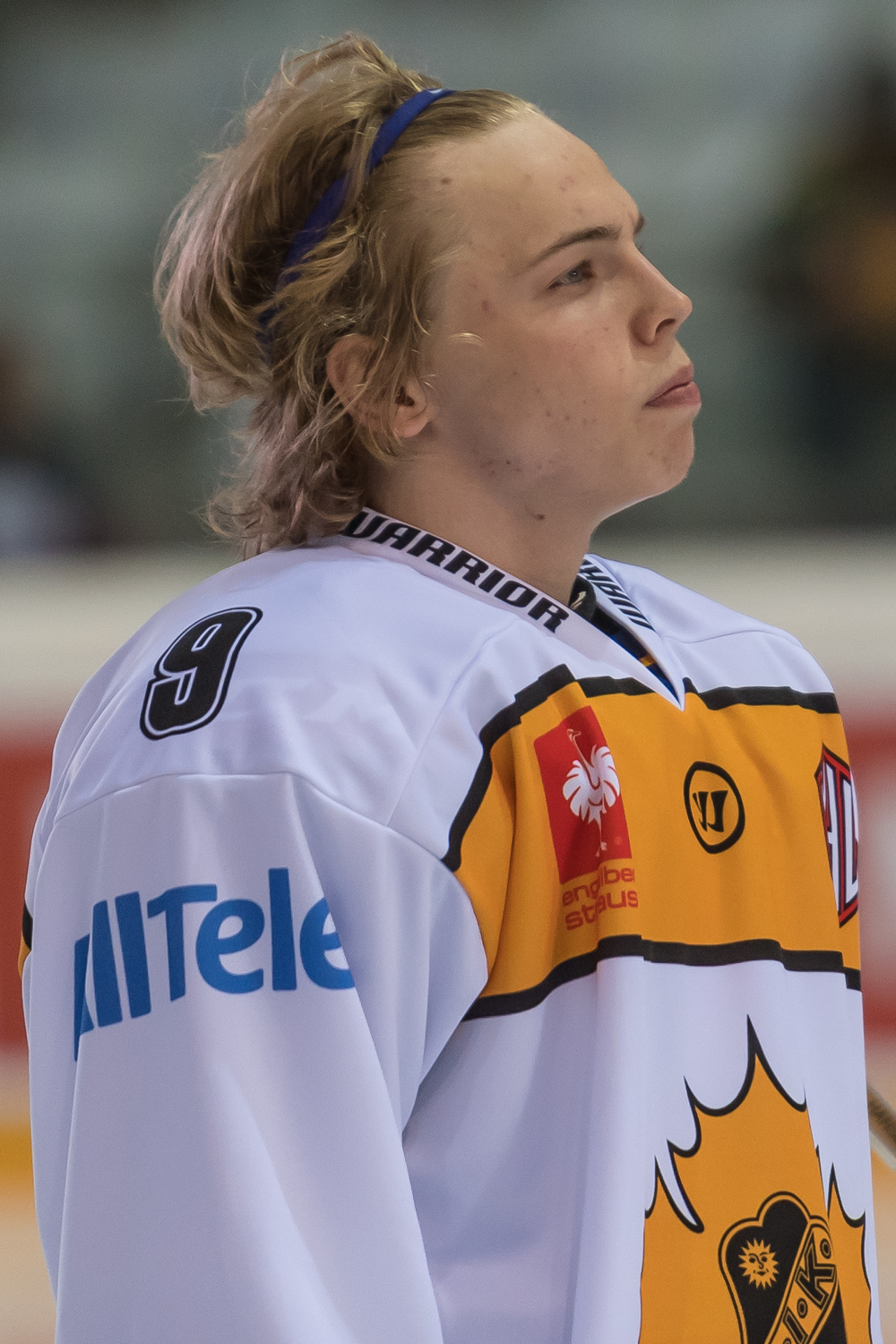
- Söderlund with Skellefteå AIK in 2016
- Born: 23 January 1998 (age 28) Skellefteå, Sweden
- Height: 5 ft 10 in (178 cm)
- Weight: 176 lb (80 kg; 12 st 8 lb)
- Position: Forward
- Shoots: Left
- SHL team Former teams: Linköping HC; Skellefteå AIK; Frölunda HC; Djurgårdens IF; BK Mladá Boleslav; HC Škoda Plzeň; HC TPS; KalPa
- NHL draft: 112th overall, 2017; Chicago Blackhawks
- Playing career: 2015–present

Tim Söderlund (born 23 January 1998) is a Swedish professional ice hockey forward for Linköping HC of the Swedish Hockey League (SHL). He was selected by the Chicago Blackhawks in the fourth round (112th overall) of the 2017 NHL entry draft.

== Playing career ==
Born in Skellefteå, Sweden, Söderlund played junior hockey, with local team Skellefteå AIK. In 2011–12, he debuted at the under-16 level as a 14-year-old, playing three games in the J16 SM. The following season he dressed for 19 U-18 games playing for Clemensnäs HC, recording 3 goals and 8 assists. He also competed with a regional all-star team from Västerbotten in the annual TV-pucken, an under-15 national tournament, and notched one goal and one assists over eight games.

In 2013–14, Söderlund moved on to Luleå HF's J20 SuperElit team at 15 years old, appearing in 30 games. In 2013, Söderlund once again participated in the TV-pucken, playing for Norrbotten. He appeared in five games throughout the tournament and recorded 1 goal and 4 assists. After impressive performances in the J20 SuperElit, with both Skellefteå AIK and Luleå HF; Söderlund played 8 games in Sweden's top-flight SHL.

On 24 June 2017, Söderlund was drafted by the Chicago Blackhawks during the 2017 NHL entry draft.

On 27 April 2018, Söderlund was signed by fellow SHL outfit, Frölunda HC. In the 2018–19 season, following 26 games with Frölunda where Söderlund scored 5 points, he returned to Skellefteå for the remainder of the campaign on 2 January 2019.

On 6 May 2019, Söderlund signed a three-year, entry-level contract with the Chicago Blackhawks.

Prior to the 2020–21 season, with the North America season delayed due to the COVID-19 pandemic, Söderlund was loaned to Swedish second tiered club, Almtuna IS, on 2 September 2020.

On 12 July 2021, Söderlund was traded to the Edmonton Oilers, along with Duncan Keith, in exchange for Caleb Jones and a conditional third-round pick in 2022. In the 2021–22 season, Söderlund split time between the Oilers AHL and ECHL affiliates in the Bakersfield Condors and the Wichita Thunder. Unable to make an impact at the AHL level, Söderlund was placed on unconditional waivers by the Oilers and after clearing he opted to mutually terminate the remainder of his contract in order to return to Sweden on 22 January 2022. He immediately agreed to a contract for the remainder of the season with Djurgårdens IF of the SHL.

With Djurgårdens relegated to the HockeyAllsvenskan for the 2022–23 season, Söderlund continued with the club and registered 4 goals and 14 points through 29 regular season games. On 2 January 2023, Söderlund left Sweden in order to attain a bigger role, and joined Czech club, BK Mladá Boleslav of the ELH, for the remainder of the season.

== Personal life ==
Tim Söderlund has an older sister named Fanny and his parents names are Ted and Katarina.

== Career statistics ==
=== Regular season and playoffs ===
			Regular season					Playoffs
Season	Team	League	GP	G	A	Pts	PIM	GP	G	A	Pts	PIM
2014–15	Luleå HF	J20	30	8	15	23	24	3	0	0	0	0
2015–16	Skellefteå AIK	J20	42	21	18	39	26	6	1	2	3	0
2015–16	Skellefteå AIK	SHL	8	0	0	0	2	—	—	—	—	—
2016–17	Skellefteå AIK	J20	6	2	3	5	4	2	0	1	1	14
2016–17	Skellefteå AIK	SHL	39	3	4	7	8	1	0	0	0	0
2017–18	Skellefteå AIK	SHL	43	9	5	14	6	16	4	0	4	0
2018–19	Frölunda HC	SHL	26	3	2	5	29	—	—	—	—	—
2018–19	Skellefteå AIK	SHL	22	3	6	9	4	6	0	0	0	2
2019–20	Rockford IceHogs	AHL	29	1	2	3	14	—	—	—	—	—
2019–20	Indy Fuel	ECHL	7	2	4	6	6	—	—	—	—	—
2020–21	Almtuna IS	Allsv	23	10	6	16	14	—	—	—	—	—
2020–21	Rockford IceHogs	AHL	23	0	5	5	2	—	—	—	—	—
2021–22	Bakersfield Condors	AHL	7	0	0	0	2	—	—	—	—	—
2021–22	Wichita Thunder	ECHL	8	3	6	9	2	—	—	—	—	—
2021–22	Djurgårdens IF	SHL	21	6	7	13	16	—	—	—	—	—
2022–23	Djurgårdens IF	Allsv	29	4	10	14	37	—	—	—	—	—
SHL totals			159	24	24	48	65	23	4	0	4	2

Medal record

Representing Sweden

Ice hockey

World Junior Championships
Silver medal – second place	2018 United States	

World U18 Championships
Silver medal – second place	2016 United States	

=== International ===
Year	Team	Event	Result	GP	G	A	Pts	PIM
2016	Sweden	U18	2nd place, silver medalist(s)	7	1	2	3	2
2017	Sweden	WJC	4th	7	2	1	3	4
2018	Sweden	WJC	2nd place, silver medalist(s)	7	2	3	5	6
Junior totals				21	5	6	11	12
