= Guillaume Maillard =

Swiss professional ice hockey centre (born 1998)

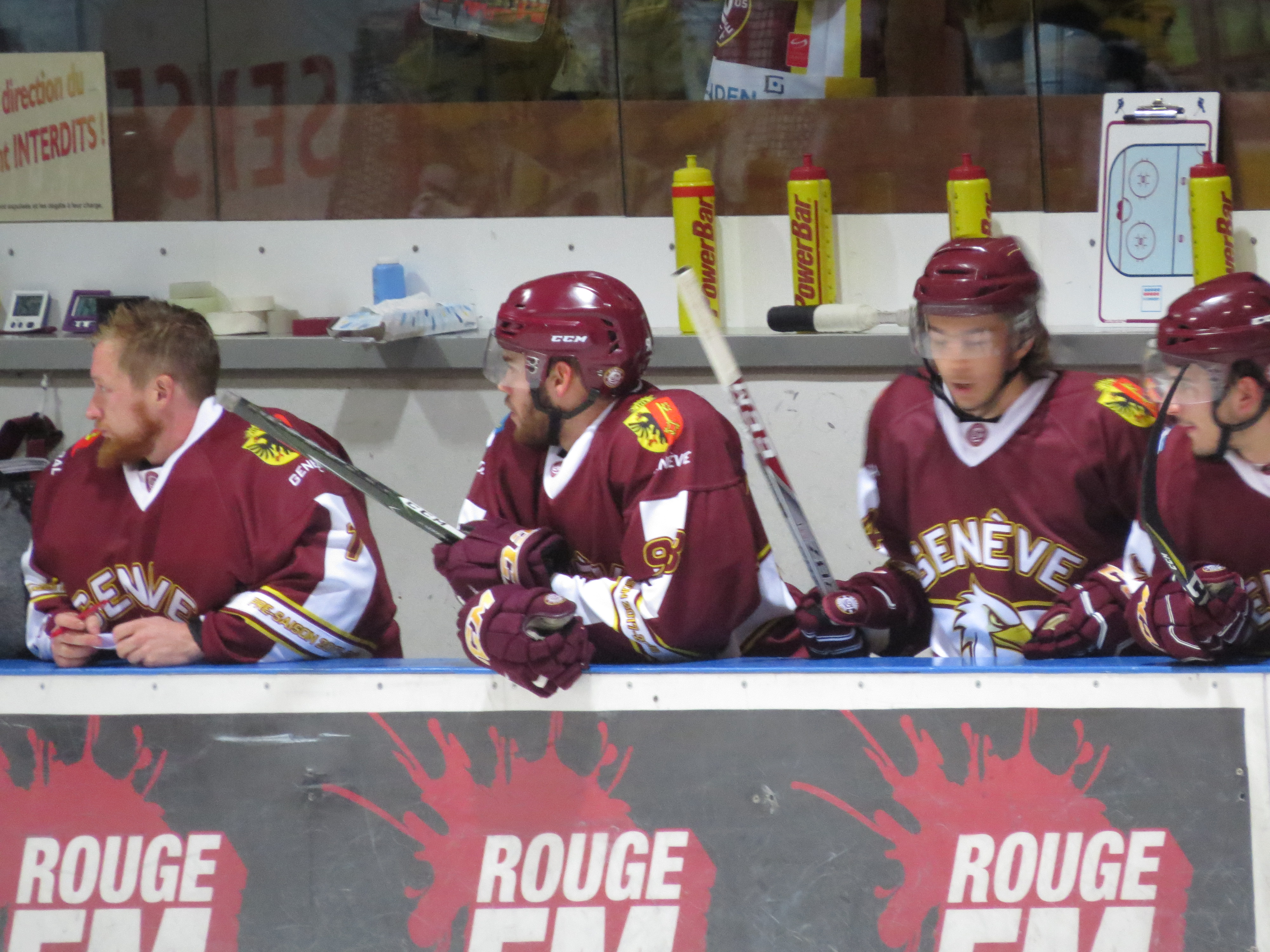
- Born: 11 October 1998 (age 26); Lausanne, Switzerland
- Height: 6 ft 0 in (183 cm)
- Weight: 198 lb (90 kg; 14 st 2 lb)
- Position: Centre
- Shoots: Left
- SL team Former teams: HC Sierre; Lausanne HC; Genève-Servette HC
- Playing career: 2016–present

Guillaume Maillard (born 11 October 1998) is a Swiss professional ice hockey centre who is currently playing with HC Sierre of the Swiss League (SL). He previously played with Genève-Servette HC and Lausanne HC in the National League (NL).

== Playing career ==
=== Junior ===
Maillard started playing hockey with Yverdon junior teams and then moved to Lausanne to join their U15 team in 2011. He went on to play 3 full seasons with the U15 and U17 teams before following his brother in joining HC Fribourg-Gottéron U17 and U20 teams for the 2014–15 season. With little hope of joining Fribourg's professional team in the future, Maillard joined Genève-Servette HC U20 team for the 2015–16 season. He played 24 games for the team that year, putting up 17 points and adding 5 points in 3 playoffs contests.

=== Genève-Servette HC ===
==== 2016–17 ====
Maillard made his professional debut with Genève-Servette HC in the 2016–17 season, appearing in 8 National League games that season. He spent the majority of the season with Geneva's junior team in the Elite Junior A, where he played 37 games and put up 51 points (21 goals).

==== 2017–18 ====
Maillard eventually played one more year with Geneva's junior team in the 2017–18 season and helped the team win the Elite Junior A championship, tallying 8 points (6 goals) in 9 playoffs games. He scored his first NL goal with Genève-Servette that same year. Maillard also had a brief stint in the Swiss League, appearing in 5 games (1 goal) with HC Ajoie.

==== 2018–19 ====
On 31 May 2018 Maillard signed a two-year contract with Genève-Servette, ending his junior career. Prior to the start of the season, he switched his jersey number from 98 to 11.

Maillard was invited to the New York Islanders prospect camp in the summer of 2018.

Maillard missed the start of the 2018–19 season with a lower body injury before being assigned on a rehab stint with HC Sierre of the MySports League. After having played 12 games with Sierre, putting up 10 points (3 goals), Maillard returned to Geneva and made his NL season debut on November 20 at home, against HC Fribourg-Gottéron.

==== 2019–20 ====
On 30 September 2019 Maillard agreed to an early two-year contract extension with Geneva through the 2021/22 season. Maillard struggled to produce offensively during the 2019–20 season and was sent on a loan to HC Sierre of the Swiss League but only appeared in one game, scoring one goal, before being called up by Geneva. He finished the season with 8 points (2 goals) over 44 regular season games.

=== Lausanne HC ===
==== 2020–21 ====
On 23 August 2020 Maillard was traded, along with Floran Douay, to Lausanne HC in exchange for Tyler Moy. He made his debut with Lausanne on 1 October 2020 in a 5–2 home win against the SCL Tigers. On 1 December 2020 Maillard tore his ACL during the Swiss Cup 1/4 finals in his first game against his former team, Genève-Servette HC. The injury forced Maillard to sit out the remainder of the season. He concluded his first season in Lausanne with 2 assists in 12 games.

==== 2021–22 ====
Maillard returned to game action with Lausanne on 10 September 2021 in a 3–2 loss to EHC Biel to kick off the season. Maillard was loaned to HC Sierre of the SL during the 2022 Winter Olympics break.

==== 2022–23 ====
Maillard began the 2022–23 season on loan with EHC Biel. On 6 October 2022 Maillard was suspended for three games and fined CHF 3,300 for abusing an official in a game on 30 September 2022 against the SC Rapperswil-Jona Lakers. He eventually returned to Lausanne for the remainder of the season.

=== Return to Geneva ===
==== 2023–24 ====
On 5 May 2023 Maillard returned to Servette and agreed to a two-year contract through the 2024/25 season. In his first season back in Geneva, Maillard won the 2023–24 Champions Hockey League with Servette.

==== 2024–25 ====
On November 29, 2024, Maillard was sent down to HC Sierre of the SL after having picked up one assist through 19 games with Geneva.

=== HC Sierre ===
==== 2025–26 ====
On August 11, 2025, Maillard agreed to a one-year contract with HC Sierre of the SL. He reunited with former head coach, Chris McSorley, who gave him his chance to make his professional debut at Servette in 2016-17.

== International play ==
Maillard was named to Switzerland's under-20 team for the 2018 IIHF World Junior Championships in Buffalo, New York. He played 5 games with the team, putting up 4 assists.

Maillard made his debut with Switzerland men's national team at the 2019 Deutschland Cup.
