= Alexei Melnichuk =

Russian ice hockey player (born 1998)

- Born: 29 June 1998 (age 28) Saint Petersburg, Russia
- Height: 6 ft 2 in (188 cm)
- Weight: 190 lb (86 kg; 13 st 8 lb)
- Position: Goaltender
- Catches: Left
- KHL team Former teams: Lokomotiv Yaroslavl; SKA Saint Petersburg; Torpedo Nizhny Novgorod; San Jose Sharks; HC Sochi; Traktor Chelyabinsk; Avangard Omsk
- NHL draft: Undrafted
- Playing career: 2018–present

Alexei Andreyvich Melnichuk (Russian: Алексей Андреевич Мельничук; born 29 June 1998) is a Russian professional ice hockey goaltender currently playing for Lokomotiv Yaroslavl of the Kontinental Hockey League (KHL).

== Playing career ==
Melnichuk played professionally in his native Russia, with SKA Saint Petersburg and Torpedo Nizhny Novgorod of the Kontinental Hockey League (KHL) before signing as an undrafted free agent to an entry-level contract with the San Jose Sharks in May 2020.

During his maiden North American season in the 2020–21 campaign, he made his NHL debut with the Sharks appearing in relief on 11 February 2021, in a 6–2 defeat to the Los Angeles Kings. He was handed his first start on 8 May 2021, in a 4–5 overtime loss to the Arizona Coyotes.

In the following 2021–22 season, Melnichuk continued in the AHL with the San Jose Barracuda. As the starting goaltender, Melnichuk collected 10 wins through 31 regular-season games. At the NHL trade deadline, Melnichuk was dealt by the Sharks to the Tampa Bay Lightning in exchange for Antoine Morand on 21 March 2022. He was immediately reassigned to the Lightning's ECHL affiliate, the Orlando Solar Bears.

After completing the season with the Solar Bears, Melnichuk's KHL rights were traded by SKA Saint Petersburg to HC Sochi on 6 May 2022. Opting to halt his North American career, Melnichuk was later signed by Sochi to a two-year contract on 11 May 2022.

During the 2022–23 season, Melnichuk made 8 appearances with Sochi before he was initially loaned to Traktor Chelyabinsk for the remainder of the season on 21 October 2022. After two months with Traktor, Melnichuk was again on the move and signed a two-way contract with Avangard Omsk on 21 December 2022.

Melnichuk made just two appearances with Avangard Omsk before his rights were traded in the off-season in a return to his former club, Torpedo Nizhny Novgorod, on 20 July 2023. He was promptly signed to a one-year contract for the 2023–24 season. Before making an appearance with Torpedo, Melnichuk left the club following an injury and moved to fellow KHL outfit, Lokomotiv Yaroslavl, on 28 December 2023.

== Career statistics ==
=== Regular season and playoffs ===
			Regular season									Playoffs
Season	Team	League	GP	W	L	T/OT	MIN	GA	SO	GAA	SV%	GP	W	L	MIN	GA	SO	GAA	SV%
2015–16	SKA-Varyagi	MHLB	9	5	3	1	545	24	0	2.64	.891	—	—	—	—	—	—	—	—
2015–16	SKA-1946	MHL	15	5	3	1	642	24	1	2.24	.915	3	0	3	158	8	0	3.04	.892
2016–17	SKA-1946	MHL	17	10	5	2	1035	39	2	2.26	.924	1	0	1	62	3	0	2.92	.889
2016–17	SKA-Neva	VHL	17	15	1	1	1029	28	5	1.63	.932	—	—	—	—	—	—	—	—
2017–18	SKA-1946	MHL	3	3	0	0	180	7	0	2.34	.873	1	0	1	45	4	0	5.30	.778
2017–18	SKA-Neva	VHL	19	16	3	0	1076	30	4	1.67	.934	8	4	1	389	12	0	1.85	.937
2017–18	SKA Saint Petersburg	KHL	2	1	0	0	67	3	0	2.68	.900	—	—	—	—	—	—	—	—
2018–19	SKA-Neva	VHL	30	20	6	2	1697	49	2	1.73	.924	9	6	3	547	10	3	1.10	.963
2018–19	SKA-1946	MHL	1	1	0	0	60	0	1	0.00	1.000	2	1	1	119	3	0	1.51	.938
2019–20	SKA Saint Petersburg	KHL	16	8	5	1	892	25	4	1.68	.930	—	—	—	—	—	—	—	—
2019–20	SKA-Neva	VHL	8	7	1	0	461	15	2	1.95	.925	10	5	4	556	20	2	2.16	.937
2020–21	Torpedo Nizhny Novgorod	KHL	14	6	6	2	851	38	0	2.68	.912	—	—	—	—	—	—	—	—
2020–21	San Jose Barracuda	AHL	17	7	7	3	1003	58	0	3.47	.868	—	—	—	—	—	—	—	—
2020–21	San Jose Sharks	NHL	3	0	1	1	131	11	0	5.05	.864	—	—	—	—	—	—	—	—
2021–22	San Jose Barracuda	AHL	31	10	14	2	1651	108	0	3.92	.867	—	—	—	—	—	—	—	—
2021–22	Orlando Solar Bears	ECHL	6	2	1	2	276	14	0	3.04	.895	—	—	—	—	—	—	—	—
2022–23	HC Sochi	KHL	8	1	4	0	372	16	0	2.58	.922	—	—	—	—	—	—	—	—
2022–23	Traktor Chelyabinsk	KHL	4	0	2	0	105	10	0	5.70	.750	—	—	—	—	—	—	—	—
2022–23	Omskie Krylia	VHL	4	0	2	0	120	11	0	5.49	.817	—	—	—	—	—	—	—	—
2022–23	Avangard Omsk	KHL	2	0	1	0	60	3	0	3.00	.857	—	—	—	—	—	—	—	—
2023–24	Lokomotiv Yaroslavl	KHL	4	2	1	0	195	4	1	1.23	.938	—	—	—	—	—	—	—	—
2024–25	Lokomotiv Yaroslavl	KHL	27	15	8	2	1526	48	4	1.89	.918	—	—	—	—	—	—	—	—
2025–26	Lokomotiv Yaroslavl	KHL	15	10	2	0	806	25	0	1.86	.914	1	0	0	28	1	0	2.13	.875
KHL totals			92	43	29	5	4,875	172	9	2.14	.914	1	0	0	28	1	0	2.13	.875
NHL totals			3	0	1	1	131	11	0	5.05	.864	—	—	—	—	—	—	—	—

=== International ===
Year	Team	Event	Result	GP	W	L	OT	MIN	GA	SO	GAA	SV%
2018	Russia	WJC	5th	1	0	0	0	40	4	0	6.00	.750
Junior totals				1	0	0	0	40	4	0	6.00	.750

== Awards and honors ==
Award	Year
KHL
Gagarin Cup champion	2025, 2026
