= Mikhail Maltsev =

Russian ice hockey player (born 1998)

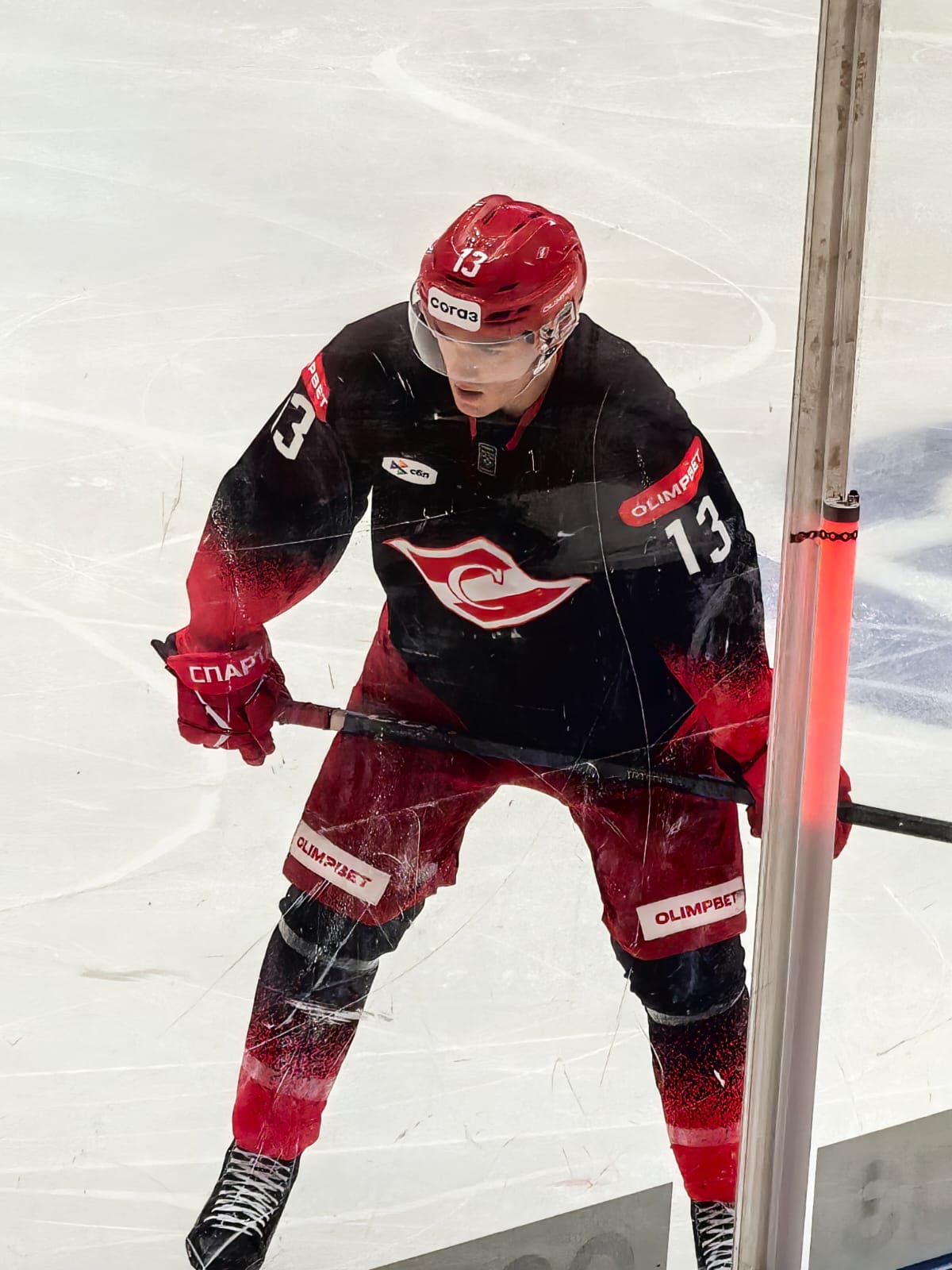
- Born: 12 March 1998 (age 28) Saint Petersburg, Russia
- Height: 6 ft 3 in (191 cm)
- Weight: 198 lb (90 kg; 14 st 2 lb)
- Position: Left wing
- Shoots: Left
- KHL team Former teams: Spartak Moscow; SKA Saint Petersburg; New Jersey Devils; Colorado Avalanche
- NHL draft: 102nd overall, 2016; New Jersey Devils
- Playing career: 2017–present

Mikhail Grigorevich Maltsev (Russian: Михаил Григорьевич Мальцев; born 12 March 1998) is a Russian professional ice hockey forward for HC Spartak Moscow of the Kontinental Hockey League (KHL). He was selected 102nd overall in the fourth round by the New Jersey Devils in the 2016 NHL entry draft. He has previously played for the Devils, Colorado Avalanche, and SKA Saint Petersburg.

== Playing career ==
=== KHL ===
Maltsev began his career with SKA Saint Petersburg's under-17 team in 2014. Maltsev then played with SKA-1946 of the Junior Hockey League (MHL) and SKA-Neva of the Supreme Hockey League (VHL), both affiliates of SKA Saint Petersburg. In the 2017–18 season, he made his Kontinental Hockey League (KHL) debut with SKA Saint Petersburg, and won the Continental Cup with the team after the regular season.

=== NHL ===
Maltsev was selected 102nd overall by the New Jersey Devils in the fourth round of the 2016 NHL entry draft. On 13 May 2019, he signed a three-year, entry-level contract with the Devils. Maltsev made his NHL debut on 31 January 2021, in the Devils' 5–3 win over the Buffalo Sabres. On 16 February, Maltsev scored his first NHL goal in the Devils' 5–2 win over the New York Rangers.

On 15 July 2021, Maltsev was traded, along with a second-round pick in the 2021 NHL entry draft, to the Colorado Avalanche in exchange for Ryan Graves.

Following two seasons within the Avalanche organization, Maltsev left as a free agent and was signed to a one-year, two-way contract with the Los Angeles Kings on 1 July 2023. Maltsev was placed on waivers following training camp with the Kings, and assigned to continue his career in the AHL with affiliate, the Ontario Reign. Opening the 2023–24 season with the Reign, Maltsev in a top-six scoring role was amongst the team's offensive leaders with 4 goals and 14 points through 21 regular season games. Unable to earn a recall to the NHL, Maltsev left North America on loan by the Kings to return to the KHL in joining HC Spartak Moscow for the remainder of the season on 11 December 2023. Maltsev completed the season with Spartak, posting 11 points through 16 regular season games and helped the club reach the Semi-finals in the Gagarin Cup playoffs.

With his contract with the Kings concluded, Maltsev was signed to a two-year contract extension to continue in the KHL with Spartak Moscow on 19 June 2024.

== International play ==
Maltsev played for the Russian national junior team during the 2018 World Junior Ice Hockey Championship.

== Career statistics ==
=== Regular season and playoffs ===
			Regular season					Playoffs
Season	Team	League	GP	G	A	Pts	PIM	GP	G	A	Pts	PIM
2015–16	Team Russia U18	MHL	29	11	12	23	20	3	0	2	2	0
2016–17	SKA-1946	MHL	14	5	9	14	2	3	1	1	2	2
2016–17	SKA-Neva	VHL	34	2	13	15	21	11	3	2	5	4
2017–18	SKA-1946	MHL	7	2	0	2	8	1	1	0	1	16
2017–18	SKA-Neva	VHL	25	5	12	17	10	20	3	5	8	14
2017–18	SKA Saint Petersburg	KHL	18	0	5	5	4	—	—	—	—	—
2018–19	SKA Saint Petersburg	KHL	13	1	1	2	0	17	1	2	3	6
2018–19	SKA-Neva	VHL	31	7	10	17	16	—	—	—	—	—
2019–20	Binghamton Devils	AHL	49	11	10	21	10	—	—	—	—	—
2020–21	SKA Saint Petersburg	KHL	4	0	1	1	2	—	—	—	—	—
2020–21	New Jersey Devils	NHL	33	6	3	9	4	—	—	—	—	—
2020–21	Binghamton Devils	AHL	1	1	0	1	0	—	—	—	—	—
2021–22	Colorado Eagles	AHL	56	17	31	48	38	9	4	2	6	6
2021–22	Colorado Avalanche	NHL	18	0	0	0	2	—	—	—	—	—
2022–23	Colorado Eagles	AHL	28	11	10	21	8	7	3	1	4	0
2022–23	Colorado Avalanche	NHL	5	0	0	0	0	—	—	—	—	—
2023–24	Ontario Reign	AHL	21	4	10	14	8	—	—	—	—	—
2023–24	Spartak Moscow	KHL	16	2	9	11	18	11	2	1	3	2
2024–25	Spartak Moscow	KHL	66	15	20	35	20	12	3	3	6	17
2025–26	Spartak Moscow	KHL	66	18	26	44	20	5	0	2	2	2
KHL totals			183	36	62	98	64	45	6	8	14	27
NHL totals			56	6	3	9	6	—	—	—	—	—

=== International ===
Year	Team	Event	Result	GP	G	A	Pts	PIM
2018	Russia	WJC	5th	5	0	2	2	6
Junior totals				5	0	2	2	6

== Awards and achievements ==
Award	Year
KHL
Continental Cup (SKA Saint Petersburg)	2017
