= Andrei Altybarmakyan =

Russian ice hockey player (born 1998)

- Born: 4 August 1998 (age 28) Saint Petersburg, Russia
- Height: 5 ft 11 in (180 cm)
- Weight: 192 lb (87 kg; 13 st 10 lb)
- Position: Right wing
- Shoots: Left
- KHL team Former teams: Lada Togliatti; SKA Saint Petersburg; HC Sochi
- NHL draft: 70th overall, 2017; Chicago Blackhawks
- Playing career: 2018–present

Andrei Ruslanovich Altybarmakyan (Russian: Андрей Русланович Алтыбармакян; born 4 August 1998) is a Russian professional ice hockey forward currently playing with HC Lada Togliatti in the Kontinental Hockey League (KHL). He was selected by the Chicago Blackhawks, in the third-round 70th overall in the 2017 NHL entry draft.

== Playing career ==
Altybarmakyan originally played as a youth within SKA Saint Petersburg junior program. He made his professional debut with the secondary team, SKA-Neva in the Supreme Hockey League during the 2016–17 season.

In the 2017–18 season, Altybarmakyan made his Kontinental Hockey League debut with SKA, making 14 appearances. In the following 2018–19 season, while playing with SKA Neva, Altybarmakyan was traded to HC Sochi on 15 October 2018.

Altybarmakyan played two seasons within Sochi, registering a career high 6 goals and 17 points through 49 games in the 2019–20 season.

On 3 April 2020, Altybarmakyan left Russia and was signed to a two-year, entry-level contract with the Chicago Blackhawks.

After two seasons in the AHL with the Blackhawks' affiliate, the Rockford IceHogs, as an impending restricted free agent, Altybarmakyan was not tendered a qualifying offer by the rebuilding Blackhawks and was released to free agency on 12 July 2022. On the same day his KHL rights were traded from SKA Saint Petersburg to HC Sochi in exchange for Kirill Melnichenko. He was later signed to a two-year contract with Sochi beginning in the 2022–23 season.

Altybarmakyan registered 6 goals and 16 points through 38 regular season games with Sochi before he was returned to SKA Saint Petersburg in a trade for financial compensation on 23 December 2022.

In the following off-season, Altybarmakyan's tenure with SKA ended as he was traded to Lada Togliatti in exchange for financial compensation on 6 July 2023.

== Career statistics ==
=== Regular season and playoffs ===
			Regular season					Playoffs
Season	Team	League	GP	G	A	Pts	PIM	GP	G	A	Pts	PIM
2014–15	SKA-Serebryanye Lvy	MHL	2	0	0	0	0	—	—	—	—	—
2015–16	SKA-Serebryanye Lvy	MHL	42	8	22	30	30	—	—	—	—	—
2016–17	SKA-Serebryanye Lvy	MHL	31	20	25	45	77	—	—	—	—	—
2016–17	SKA-Neva	VHL	27	5	4	9	10	11	0	0	0	4
2017–18	SKA-1946	MHL	7	3	2	5	14	1	0	1	1	2
2017–18	SKA-Neva	VHL	32	9	9	18	31	20	7	3	10	56
2017–18	SKA Saint Petersburg	KHL	14	0	0	0	4	—	—	—	—	—
2018–19	SKA-1946	MHL	3	3	2	5	0	—	—	—	—	—
2018–19	SKA-Neva	VHL	11	2	5	7	4	—	—	—	—	—
2018–19	HC Sochi	KHL	38	2	4	6	14	5	2	1	3	4
2019–20	HC Sochi	KHL	49	6	11	17	39	—	—	—	—	—
2019–20	HC Tambov	VHL	3	0	0	0	4	—	—	—	—	—
2020–21	Rockford IceHogs	AHL	29	5	7	12	34	—	—	—	—	—
2021–22	Rockford IceHogs	AHL	65	10	21	31	70	2	0	0	0	2
2022–23	HC Sochi	KHL	38	6	10	16	59	—	—	—	—	—
2022–23	SKA Saint Petersburg	KHL	10	1	1	2	7	1	0	0	0	0
2023–24	Lada Togliatti	KHL	61	13	16	29	38	5	0	2	2	2
2024–25	Lada Togliatti	KHL	50	5	15	20	22	—	—	—	—	—
2025–26	Lada Togliatti	KHL	62	19	15	34	74	—	—	—	—	—
KHL totals			322	52	72	124	257	11	2	3	5	6

=== International ===
Year	Team	Event	Result	GP	G	A	Pts	PIM
2018	Russia	WJC	5th	5	1	2	3	2
Junior totals				5	1	2	3	2
