= Jake Bean =

Canadian ice hockey player (born 1998)

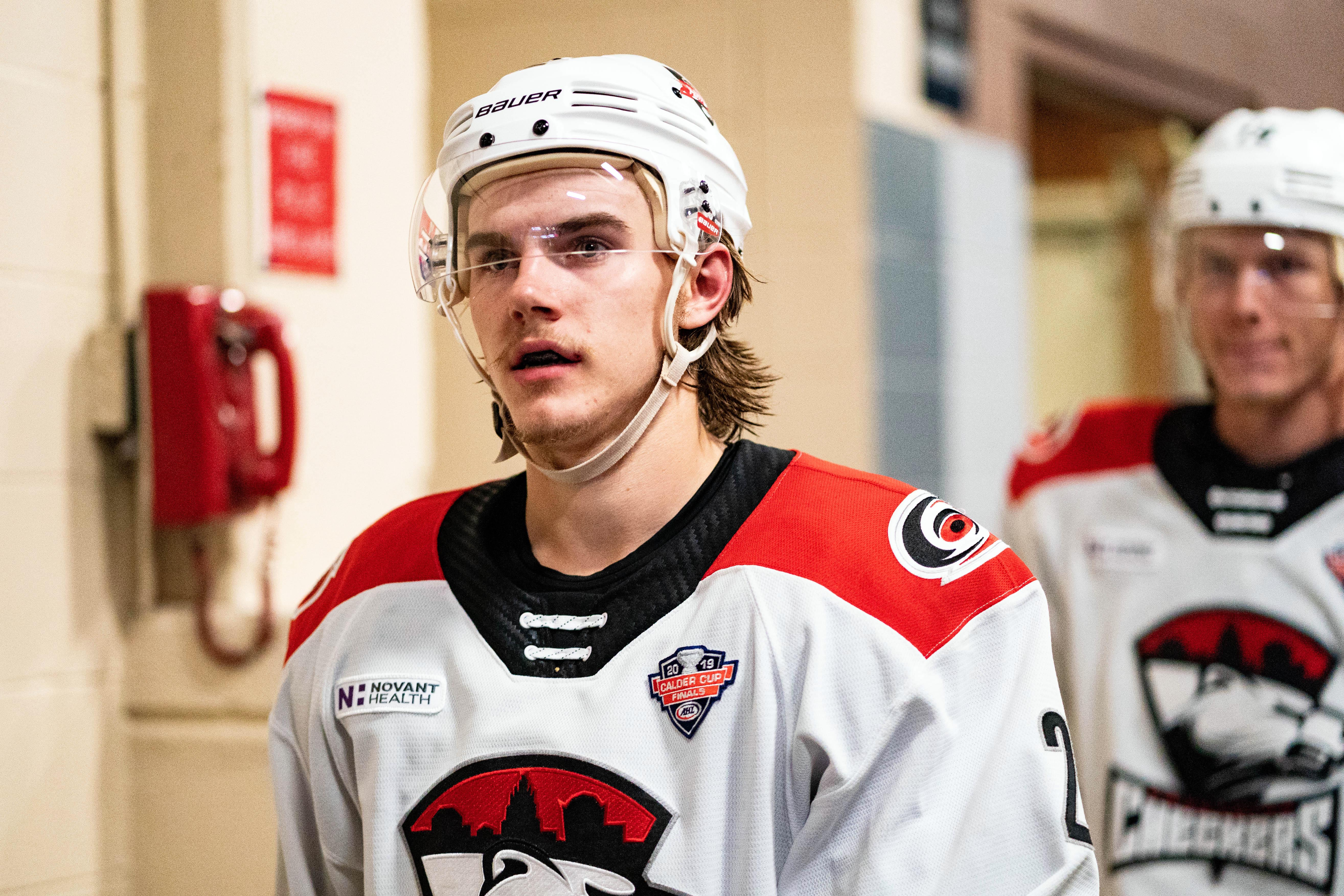
- Bean with the Charlotte Checkers in 2019
- Born: June 9, 1998 (age 28) Calgary, Alberta, Canada
- Height: 6 ft 1 in (185 cm)
- Weight: 191 lb (87 kg; 13 st 9 lb)
- Position: Defence
- Shoots: Left
- NHL team Former teams: Free agent Carolina Hurricanes; Columbus Blue Jackets; Calgary Flames
- NHL draft: 13th overall, 2016; Carolina Hurricanes
- Playing career: 2018–present

Jake Bean (born June 9, 1998) is a Canadian professional ice hockey defenceman who is currently an unrestricted free agent. He most recently played for the Calgary Flames of the National Hockey League (NHL). Bean was drafted in the first round, 13th overall in the 2016 NHL entry draft by the Carolina Hurricanes.

== Playing career ==
While playing for Edge School during the 2013–14 season, Bean was awarded the Canadian Sport School Hockey League’s Elite 15 Top Defenceman award.

Bean went undrafted in the WHL Bantam draft, and was able to sign with his hometown Calgary Hitmen. Bean impressed in his rookie season with the Hitmen, posting 39 points in 51 games. He also broke the Hitmen rookie record for most points in a single season by a rookie defenceman. The next season, Bean recorded a career high in goals and assists to get him drafted 13th overall by the Carolina Hurricanes.

On July 9, 2016, Bean was signed to a three-year, entry-level contract with the Carolina Hurricanes. At the conclusion of the 2016–17 season with the Hitmen, Bean was re-assigned to join and train with the Hurricanes AHL affiliate, the Charlotte Checkers. However, he did not play a game for them and returned to the Hitmen for the following season.

During the 2017–18 season, Bean was named an alternate captain for the Hitmen, along with Beck Malenstyn. On January 6, 2018, Bean was traded to the Tri-City Americans.

In his first professional year in 2018–19, after beginning the season in the AHL with the Charlotte Checkers, on November 27, 2018, Bean was recalled and made his NHL debut with the Hurricanes against the Montreal Canadiens.

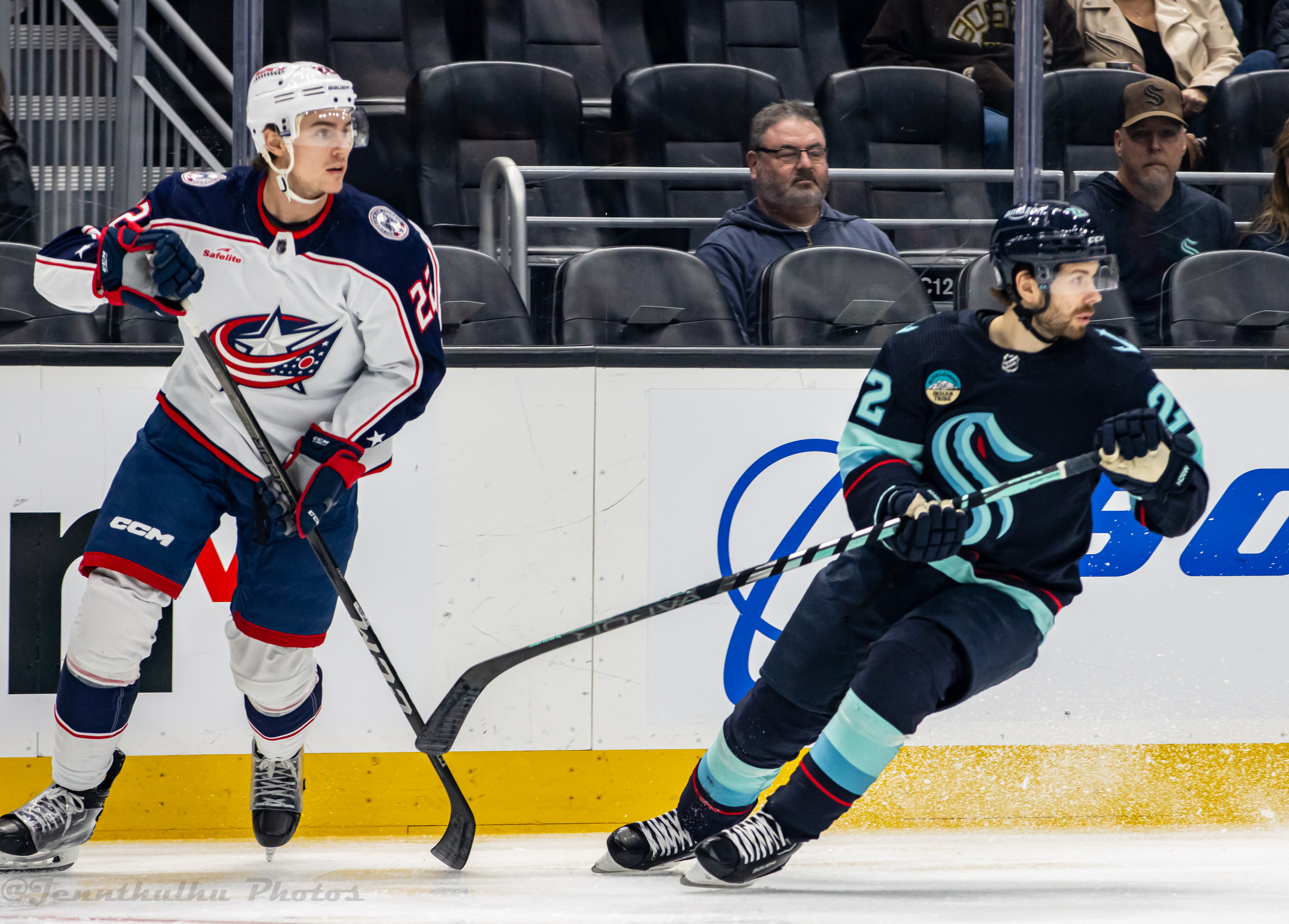
Bean (left) in action with the Blue Jackets in 2024.

On July 23, 2021, Bean was traded by the Hurricanes to the Columbus Blue Jackets in exchange for a second-round pick in the 2021 NHL entry draft. As a restricted free agent, Bean was signed to a three-year, $7 million contract extension with the Blue Jackets on July 30, 2021.

As a free agent at the conclusion of his contract with the Blue Jackets, Bean was signed to a two-year, $3.5 million contract with the Calgary Flames on July 1, 2024.

== Career statistics ==
=== Regular season and playoffs ===
			Regular season					Playoffs
Season	Team	League	GP	G	A	Pts	PIM	GP	G	A	Pts	PIM
2014–15	Calgary Hitmen	WHL	51	5	34	39	2	7	2	4	6	0
2015–16	Calgary Hitmen	WHL	68	24	40	64	28	5	0	2	2	2
2016–17	Calgary Hitmen	WHL	43	8	37	45	14	4	0	2	2	0
2017–18	Calgary Hitmen	WHL	25	5	22	27	12	—	—	—	—	—
2017–18	Tri-City Americans	WHL	32	7	14	21	10	14	1	17	18	2
2017–18	Charlotte Checkers	AHL	—	—	—	—	—	1	0	0	0	0
2018–19	Charlotte Checkers	AHL	70	13	31	44	26	15	1	4	5	10
2018–19	Carolina Hurricanes	NHL	2	0	0	0	2	—	—	—	—	—
2019–20	Charlotte Checkers	AHL	59	10	38	48	34	—	—	—	—	—
2020–21	Carolina Hurricanes	NHL	42	1	11	12	10	11	1	0	1	4
2021–22	Columbus Blue Jackets	NHL	67	7	18	25	26	—	—	—	—	—
2022–23	Columbus Blue Jackets	NHL	14	1	5	6	6	—	—	—	—	—
2023–24	Columbus Blue Jackets	NHL	72	4	9	13	32	—	—	—	—	—
2024–25	Calgary Flames	NHL	64	2	5	7	8	—	—	—	—	—
2025–26	Calgary Flames	NHL	16	1	1	2	16	—	—	—	—	—
NHL totals			277	16	49	65	100	11	1	0	1	4

Medal record

Representing Canada

Ice hockey

World Junior Championships
Gold medal – first place	2018 United States	
Silver medal – second place	2017 Canada	

Ivan Hlinka Memorial Tournament
Gold medal – first place	2015 Piešťany	

=== International ===
Year	Team	Event	Result	GP	G	A	Pts	PIM
2014	Canada Black	U17	7th	5	1	3	4	2
2015	Canada	IH18	1st place, gold medalist(s)	4	0	1	1	4
2017	Canada	WJC	2nd place, silver medalist(s)	7	0	2	2	2
2018	Canada	WJC	1st place, gold medalist(s)	7	0	3	3	0
Junior totals				23	1	9	10	8

== Awards and honours ==
Award	Year
CHL / WHL
CHL/NHL Top Prospects Game	2016
East Second All-Star Team	2016, 2017
AHL
AHL All-Rookie Team	2019
Calder Cup (Charlotte Checkers)	2019
AHL All-Star Game	2020
AHL First All-Star Team	2020
Eddie Shore Award	2020

Awards and achievements
Preceded by Noah Hanifin	Carolina Hurricanes first-round draft pick 2016	Succeeded by Julien Gauthier
