= Oskar Steen =

Swedish professional ice hockey forward (born 1998)

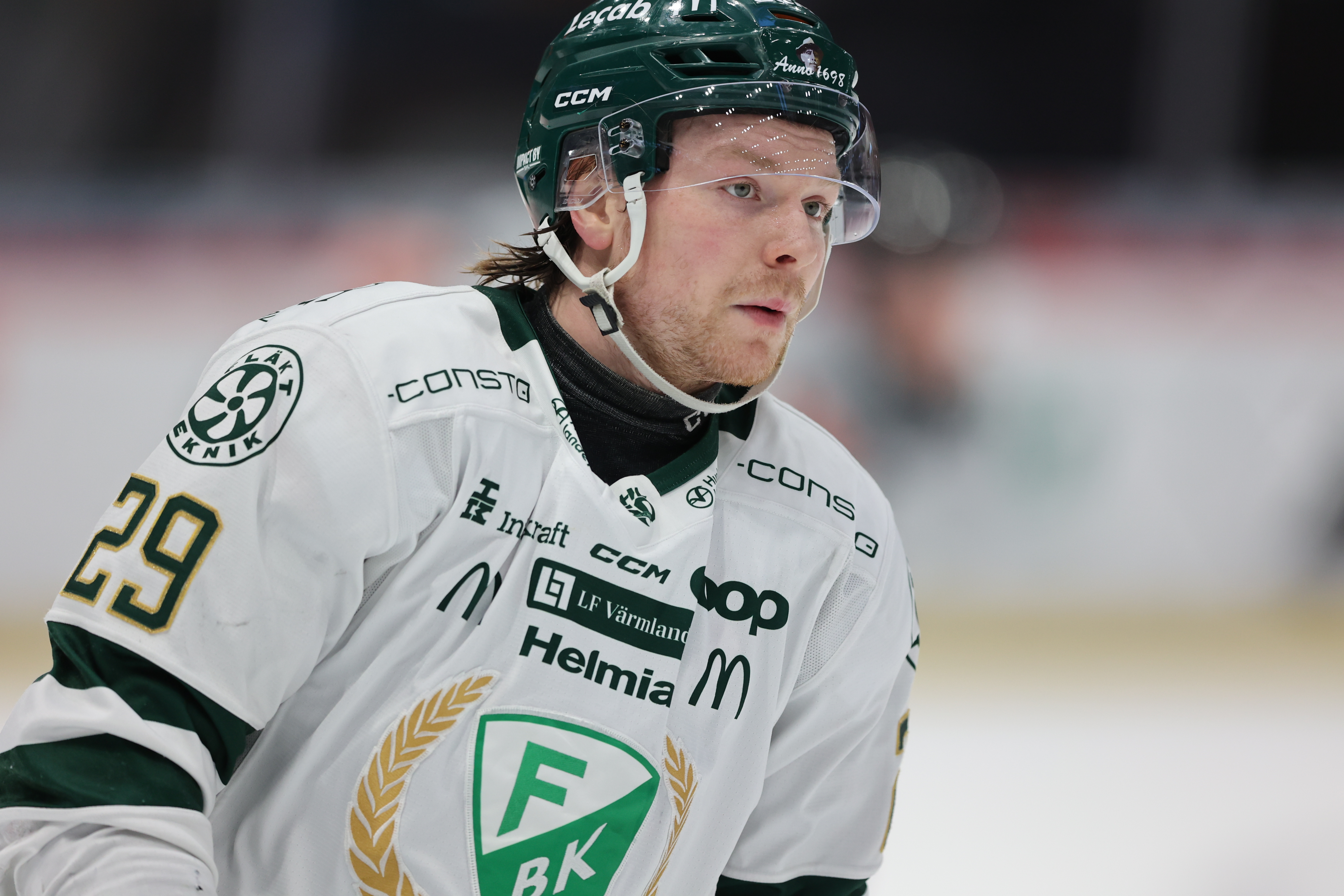
- Steen with Färjestad BK in 2026
- Born: 9 March 1998 (age 28) Karlstad, Sweden
- Height: 5 ft 9 in (175 cm)
- Weight: 199 lb (90 kg; 14 st 3 lb)
- Position: Centre
- Shoots: Right
- SHL team Former teams: Färjestad BK; Boston Bruins
- NHL draft: 165th overall, 2016; Boston Bruins
- Playing career: 2016–present

Oskar Steen (born 9 March 1998) is a Swedish professional ice hockey forward who plays for Färjestad BK of the Swedish Hockey League (SHL). He previously played for the Boston Bruins organization of the National Hockey League (NHL). Steen was drafted by the Bruins in the sixth round, 165th overall, of the 2016 NHL entry draft.

== Playing career ==
Steen made his Swedish Hockey League debut with Färjestad BK during the 2015–16 SHL season. He was selected by the Bruins in the sixth round (165th overall) of the 2016 NHL Entry Draft. On May 3, 2019, it was announced that the Bruins had signed Steen to a three-year entry-level contract.

On 10 September 2020, with the North American season to be delayed, Steen was loaned by the Bruins to join Swedish Allsvenskan club, IF Björklöven, to begin the 2020–21 season until the commencement of the Bruins' training camp.

On 24 October 2021, Steen registered his first NHL point with an assist on a Jake DeBrusk goal in a 4–3 victory versus the San Jose Sharks. On 4 January 2022, Steen scored his first NHL goal in a 5–3 victory versus the New Jersey Devils.

On July 13, 2024, after spending five seasons with the Bruins organization, Steen went back to Sweden and inked a five-year deal with Färjestad of the SHL.

== International play ==
Medal record

Representing Sweden

Ice hockey

World Junior Championships
Silver medal – second place	2018 United States	

IIHF World U18 Championship
Silver medal – second place	2016 United States	

Ivan Hlinka Memorial Tournament
Silver medal – second place	2015 Czech Republic/Slovakia	

World U-17 Hockey Challenge
Bronze medal – third place	2014 Canada	

Steen has won a medal at every junior level. He first represented Sweden at the 2015 World U-17 Hockey Challenge, winning the bronze medal. He made his IIHF World U20 Championship debut in 2018, winning the silver medal after losing to Canada in the final.

== Career statistics ==
=== Regular season and playoffs ===
			Regular season					Playoffs
Season	Team	League	GP	G	A	Pts	PIM	GP	G	A	Pts	PIM
2014–15	Färjestad BK	J20	36	7	6	13	16	6	2	2	4	4
2015–16	Färjestad BK	J20	33	8	24	32	37	—	—	—	—	—
2015–16	Färjestad BK	SHL	17	0	6	6	4	5	0	0	0	2
2016–17	Färjestad BK	J20	8	5	6	11	8	—	—	—	—	—
2016–17	Färjestad BK	SHL	47	1	2	3	8	7	0	0	0	0
2016–17	Modo Hockey	Allsv	4	0	0	0	2	—	—	—	—	—
2016–17	Forshaga IF	Div.1	1	1	1	2	0	—	—	—	—	—
2017–18	Färjestad BK	SHL	45	4	2	6	16	5	0	0	0	2
2018–19	Färjestad BK	SHL	46	17	20	37	49	14	2	5	7	8
2019–20	Providence Bruins	AHL	60	7	16	23	48	—	—	—	—	—
2020–21	IF Björklöven	Allsv	16	12	3	15	10	—	—	—	—	—
2020–21	Providence Bruins	AHL	23	5	6	11	12	—	—	—	—	—
2020–21	Boston Bruins	NHL	3	0	0	0	2	—	—	—	—	—
2021–22	Providence Bruins	AHL	49	15	20	35	26	2	0	0	0	0
2021–22	Boston Bruins	NHL	20	2	4	6	6	—	—	—	—	—
2022–23	Providence Bruins	AHL	64	14	17	31	34	4	1	0	1	4
2022–23	Boston Bruins	NHL	3	1	0	1	0	—	—	—	—	—
2023–24	Boston Bruins	NHL	34	1	0	1	4	—	—	—	—	—
2023–24	Providence Bruins	AHL	25	12	4	16	12	3	0	2	2	0
2024–25	Färjestad BK	SHL	52	30	15	45	40	6	0	2	2	2
SHL totals			207	52	45	97	117	37	2	7	9	14
NHL totals			60	4	4	8	12	—	—	—	—	—

=== International ===
Year	Team	Event	Result	GP	G	A	Pts	PIM
2014	Sweden	U17	3rd place, bronze medalist(s)	6	1	0	1	4
2015	Sweden	IH18	2nd place, silver medalist(s)	5	0	0	0	4
2016	Sweden	U18	2nd place, silver medalist(s)	7	2	1	3	6
2018	Sweden	WJC	2nd place, silver medalist(s)	7	2	2	4	12
Junior totals				25	5	3	8	26
