= Max Comtois =

Canadian ice hockey player (born 1999)

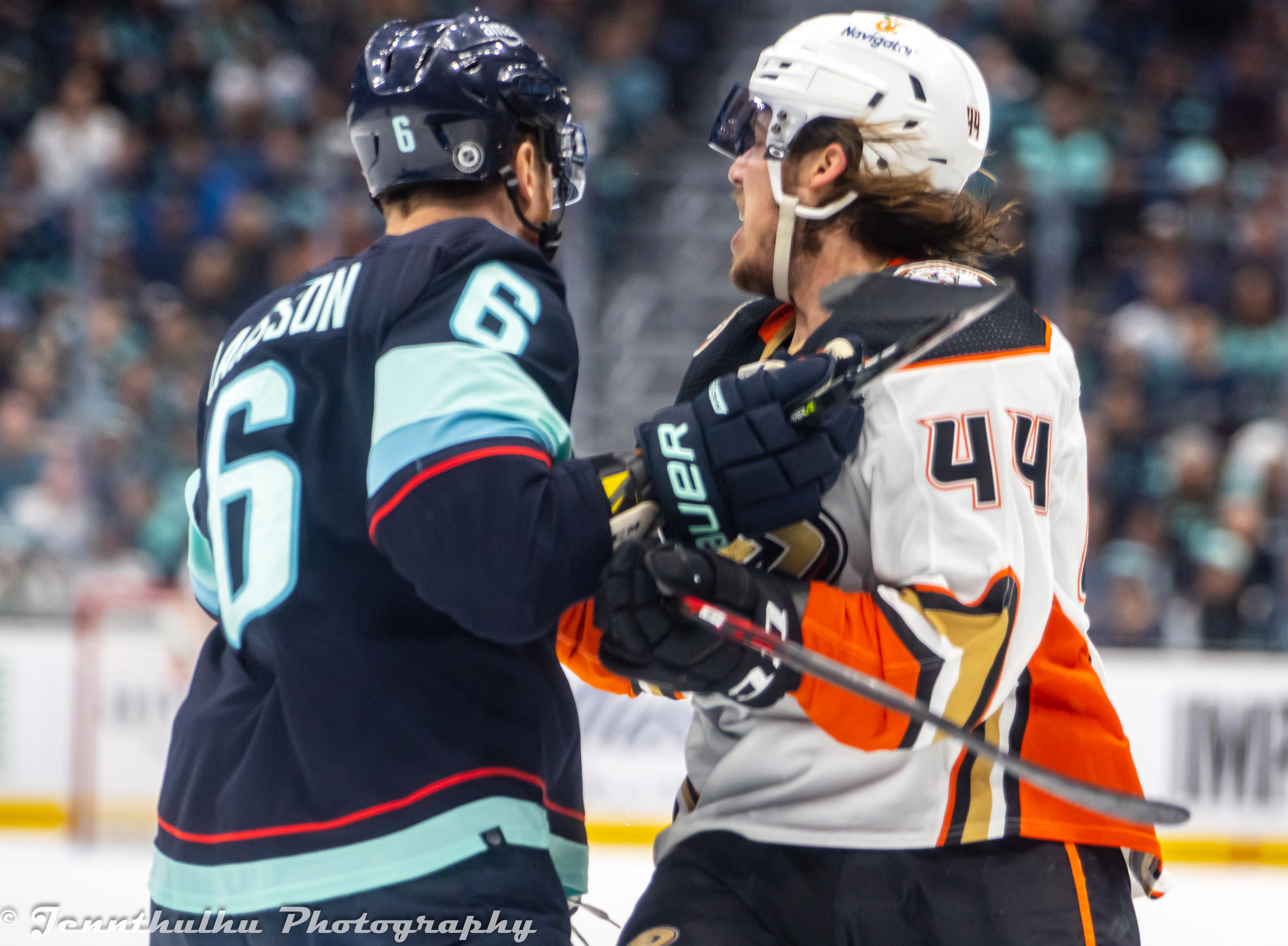
- Comtois (right) with the Anaheim Ducks in 2023, battling with Adam Larsson of the Seattle Kraken
- Born: January 8, 1999 (age 27) Longueuil, Quebec, Canada
- Height: 6 ft 2 in (188 cm)
- Weight: 210 lb (95 kg; 15 st 0 lb)
- Position: Left wing
- Shoots: Left
- KHL team Former teams: Spartak Moscow; Anaheim Ducks; Carolina Hurricanes; Dynamo Moscow
- National team: Canada
- NHL draft: 50th overall, 2017; Anaheim Ducks
- Playing career: 2018–present

Maxime Comtois (born January 8, 1999) is a Canadian professional ice hockey left winger for HC Spartak Moscow of the Kontinental Hockey League (KHL). He has previously played in the National Hockey League (NHL) with the Anaheim Ducks and Carolina Hurricanes.

== Playing career ==
Comtois was drafted by the Victoriaville Tigres third overall in the 2015 QMJHL Entry Draft. On June 24, 2017, Comtois was selected in the second round, 50th overall by the Anaheim Ducks in the 2017 NHL entry draft. He signed a three-year entry-level contract with the Ducks on March 3, 2018.

Comtois made the Ducks' 2018 opening night roster out of training camp. On October 3, 2018, he made his professional debut in the Ducks' 2018–19 season opener in San Jose and scored his first professional goal in the first minute of the game, on his first shot attempt at goaltender Martin Jones. The Ducks went on to win the game 5–2. Comtois contributed to be amongst the Ducks scoring leaders to start the season, scoring 7 points in his first 10 games before suffering an injury. On his return he was assigned to AHL affiliate, the San Diego Gulls, before he was returned to his junior club, the Drummondville Voltigeurs of the Quebec Major Junior Hockey League (QMJHL) on November 24, 2018.

Following his fifth season within the Ducks organization, as a pending restricted free agent Comtois was not tendered a qualifying offer by the Ducks and was released as a free agent on July 1, 2023. Several months later, on September 12, Comtois signed a professional tryout agreement with the Vegas Golden Knights; he was subsequently released on October 9, after the conclusion of the preseason.

On October 16, 2023, without a NHL contract to begin the 2023–24 season, Comtois opted to continue his career in the AHL by signing a one-year contract with independent club, the Chicago Wolves. Contributing offensively with the Wolves, Comtois was signed to a one-year, two-way contract with the Carolina Hurricanes for the remainder of the season on March 4, 2024. He featured in one regular season game, providing an assist, and one playoff game with the Hurricanes.

As a free agent in the following off-season, Comtois signed a one-year contract with HC Dynamo Moscow of the KHL, on July 18, 2024.

Following two seasons with Dynamo, Comtois' rights were traded to Spartak Moscow before he was signed to a one-year agreement for the 2026–27 season on June 22, 2026.

== International play ==
Medal record

Representing Canada

Ice hockey

World Championships
Gold medal – first place	2021 Latvia	
Silver medal – second place	2022 Finland	

World Junior Championships
Gold medal – first place	2018 United States	

On December 25, 2018, Comtois was named captain for Canada national junior team while they competed at the 2019 World Junior Ice Hockey Championships. He is the only player to return from the 2018 gold medal-winning team. On December 26, Comtois scored four goals in a 14–0 win over Denmark national junior team in the first game of the tournament. Comtois became the fifth player from Team Canada to score four goals in a World Juniors game, with the last being Taylor Raddysh in 2017. After Canada was eliminated from the tournament, Comtois revealed he had been playing with a separated shoulder.

== Career statistics ==
=== Regular season and playoffs ===
			Regular season					Playoffs
Season	Team	League	GP	G	A	Pts	PIM	GP	G	A	Pts	PIM
2015–16	Victoriaville Tigres	QMJHL	64	26	34	60	68	5	1	5	6	4
2016–17	Victoriaville Tigres	QMJHL	64	22	29	51	88	4	1	0	1	8
2017–18	Victoriaville Tigres	QMJHL	54	44	41	85	79	13	4	8	12	16
2018–19	Anaheim Ducks	NHL	10	2	5	7	7	—	—	—	—	—
2018–19	San Diego Gulls	AHL	4	1	0	1	2	12	5	4	9	4
2018–19	Drummondville Voltigeurs	QMJHL	25	31	17	48	32	16	11	4	15	24
2019–20	San Diego Gulls	AHL	31	9	15	24	53	—	—	—	—	—
2019–20	Anaheim Ducks	NHL	29	5	6	11	24	—	—	—	—	—
2020–21	Anaheim Ducks	NHL	55	16	17	33	40	—	—	—	—	—
2021–22	Anaheim Ducks	NHL	52	6	10	16	46	—	—	—	—	—
2022–23	Anaheim Ducks	NHL	64	9	10	19	76	—	—	—	—	—
2023–24	Chicago Wolves	AHL	65	19	25	44	109	—	—	—	—	—
2023–24	Carolina Hurricanes	NHL	1	0	1	1	0	1	0	0	0	0
2024–25	Dynamo Moscow	KHL	62	21	29	50	99	15	7	6	13	26
2025–26	Dynamo Moscow	KHL	54	19	15	34	77	3	0	0	0	0
NHL totals			211	38	49	87	193	1	0	0	0	0
KHL totals			116	40	44	84	176	18	7	6	13	26

=== International ===
Year	Team	Event	Result	GP	G	A	Pts	PIM
2016	Canada	IH18	5th	4	4	1	5	8
2017	Canada	U18	5th	5	2	0	2	28
2018	Canada	WJC	1st place, gold medalist(s)	7	3	3	6	4
2019	Canada	WJC	6th	5	5	1	6	8
2021	Canada	WC	1st place, gold medalist(s)	10	4	2	6	14
2022	Canada	WC	2nd place, silver medalist(s)	10	3	4	7	29
Junior totals				21	14	5	19	48
Senior totals				20	7	6	13	43
