= Riley Tufte =

American ice hockey player (born 1998)

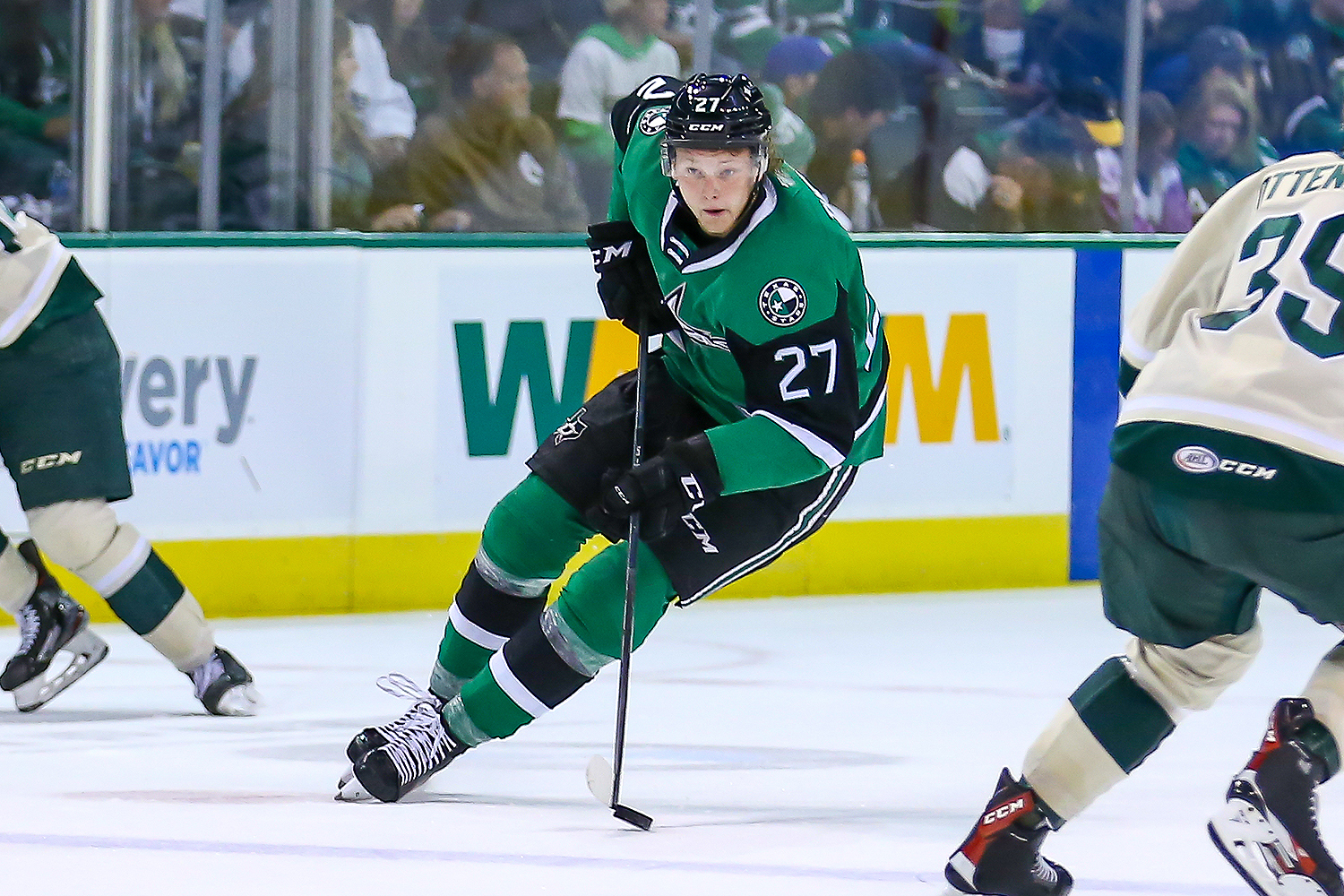
- Tufte with the Texas Stars in 2022
- Born: April 10, 1998 (age 28) Coon Rapids, Minnesota, U.S.
- Height: 6 ft 6 in (198 cm)
- Weight: 233 lb (106 kg; 16 st 9 lb)
- Position: Winger
- Shoots: Left
- NHL team (P) Cur. team Former teams: New Jersey Devils; Utica Comets (AHL); Dallas Stars; Colorado Avalanche; Boston Bruins
- NHL draft: 25th overall, 2016; Dallas Stars
- Playing career: 2019–present

Riley Jack Tufte (born April 10, 1998) is an American professional ice hockey player who is a winger for the Utica Comets of the American Hockey League (AHL) while under contract to the New Jersey Devils of the National Hockey League (NHL). He has played for the Fargo Force of the United States Hockey League (USHL), and played college ice hockey for the University of Minnesota-Duluth. Tufte was drafted in the first round, 25th overall, of the 2016 NHL entry draft by the Dallas Stars.

== Playing career ==
=== Minors and college ===
Tufte played for Blaine High School in Minnesota, where he was awarded the 2015–16 Mr. Hockey Award in his senior year after he led all of Minnesota Class AA in goals scored. He also played two seasons for the Fargo Force of the USHL, accumulating 19 points in 34 games, before deciding to go back to high school for his senior year. In March 2016, Tufte was invited to Team USA's 2016 National Junior Evaluation Camp, to prepare for the 2016 World Junior Ice Hockey Championships, however he broke his wrist during camp and could not play. Despite this, Tufte became the highest NHL draft pick in the history of the Fargo Force when he was drafted in the first round of the 2016 NHL entry draft. Instead of going pro right away, Tufte decided to pursue higher education at the University of Minnesota Duluth.

Tufte missed the beginning of his freshman season due to an injury but he completed the season with 16 points. He was off to a stronger start in his sophomore season, leading the team in scoring as they advanced through the NCAA Men's Ice Hockey Championship.

=== Professional ===
On April 17, 2019, Tufte signed a three-year, entry-level contract with the Dallas Stars after the conclusion of his junior collegiate season.

Unable to establish himself through four seasons within the Stars organization, Tufte left as a free agent and was signed to a one-year, two-way contract with the Colorado Avalanche on July 1, 2023.

Having concluded his contract with the Avalanche, once again as a free agent, Tufte was signed a one-year, two-way deal with the Boston Bruins on July 1, 2024.

After two seasons within the Bruins organization and having concluded his contract, Tufte was signed as a free agent to a one-year, $850,000 contract with the New Jersey Devils for the 2026–27 season on July 1, 2026.

== International play ==
Tufte's played in both the 2014 Under-17 Five Nations Cup and the 2014 World U-17 Hockey Challenge. He helped Team USA place second in the 2014 Under-17 Five Nations Cup.

Tufte competed in the 2015 Ivan Hlinka Memorial Tournament for Team USA, who finished fifth in the tournament. He later competed at the 2018 World Junior Ice Hockey Championships where he helped Team USA secure a bronze medal.

== Personal life ==
Tufte was born and grew up in Coon Rapids, Minnesota with three siblings, his father Jamie, and mother Amy, who is a nurse. At the age of 11, Tufte was diagnosed with Type 1 diabetes. As a child, he received an inspirational letter from retired NHL player Toby Petersen who also suffered from diabetes. In February 2020 Riley and his wife, Morgan, welcomed their first son.

== Career statistics ==
=== Regular season and playoffs ===
			Regular season					Playoffs
Season	Team	League	GP	G	A	Pts	PIM	GP	G	A	Pts	PIM
2012–13	Blaine High	USHS	24	2	1	3	4	2	0	0	0	0
2013–14	Blaine High	USHS	25	17	18	35	26	3	0	2	2	0
2014–15	Blaine High	USHS	24	23	28	51	30	3	4	4	8	0
2014–15	Fargo Force	USHL	7	1	4	5	2	—	—	—	—	—
2015–16	Fargo Force	USHL	27	10	4	14	30	—	—	—	—	—
2016–17	U. of Minnesota Duluth	NCHC	37	9	7	16	26	—	—	—	—	—
2017–18	U. of Minnesota Duluth	NCHC	42	16	13	29	36	—	—	—	—	—
2018–19	U. of Minnesota Duluth	NCHC	42	9	10	19	30	—	—	—	—	—
2019–20	Texas Stars	AHL	53	3	12	15	42	—	—	—	—	—
2020–21	Texas Stars	AHL	36	3	6	9	32	—	—	—	—	—
2021–22	Texas Stars	AHL	54	10	10	20	36	1	0	0	0	0
2021–22	Dallas Stars	NHL	10	1	0	1	4	—	—	—	—	—
2022–23	Texas Stars	AHL	63	19	16	35	90	8	0	3	3	4
2022–23	Dallas Stars	NHL	3	0	0	0	0	—	—	—	—	—
2023–24	Colorado Eagles	AHL	67	23	22	45	91	3	0	1	1	2
2023–24	Colorado Avalanche	NHL	5	1	1	2	2	—	—	—	—	—
2024–25	Boston Bruins	NHL	6	0	0	0	4	—	—	—	—	—
2024–25	Providence Bruins	AHL	58	21	21	42	60	8	4	2	6	6
2025–26	Providence Bruins	AHL	64	32	24	56	71	4	1	0	1	4
2025–26	Boston Bruins	NHL	4	1	0	1	0	—	—	—	—	—
NHL totals			28	3	1	4	10	—	—	—	—	—

=== International ===
Year	Team	Event	Result	GP	G	A	Pts	PIM
2014	United States	U17	2nd place, silver medalist(s)	6	0	1	1	4
2015	United States	IH18	5th	4	0	0	0	2
2018	United States	WJC	3rd place, bronze medalist(s)	7	0	3	3	2
Junior totals				17	0	4	4	8

Awards and achievements
Preceded by Denis Gurianov	Dallas Stars first-round draft pick 2016	Succeeded by Miro Heiskanen
