= Dylan Samberg =

American ice hockey player (born 1999)

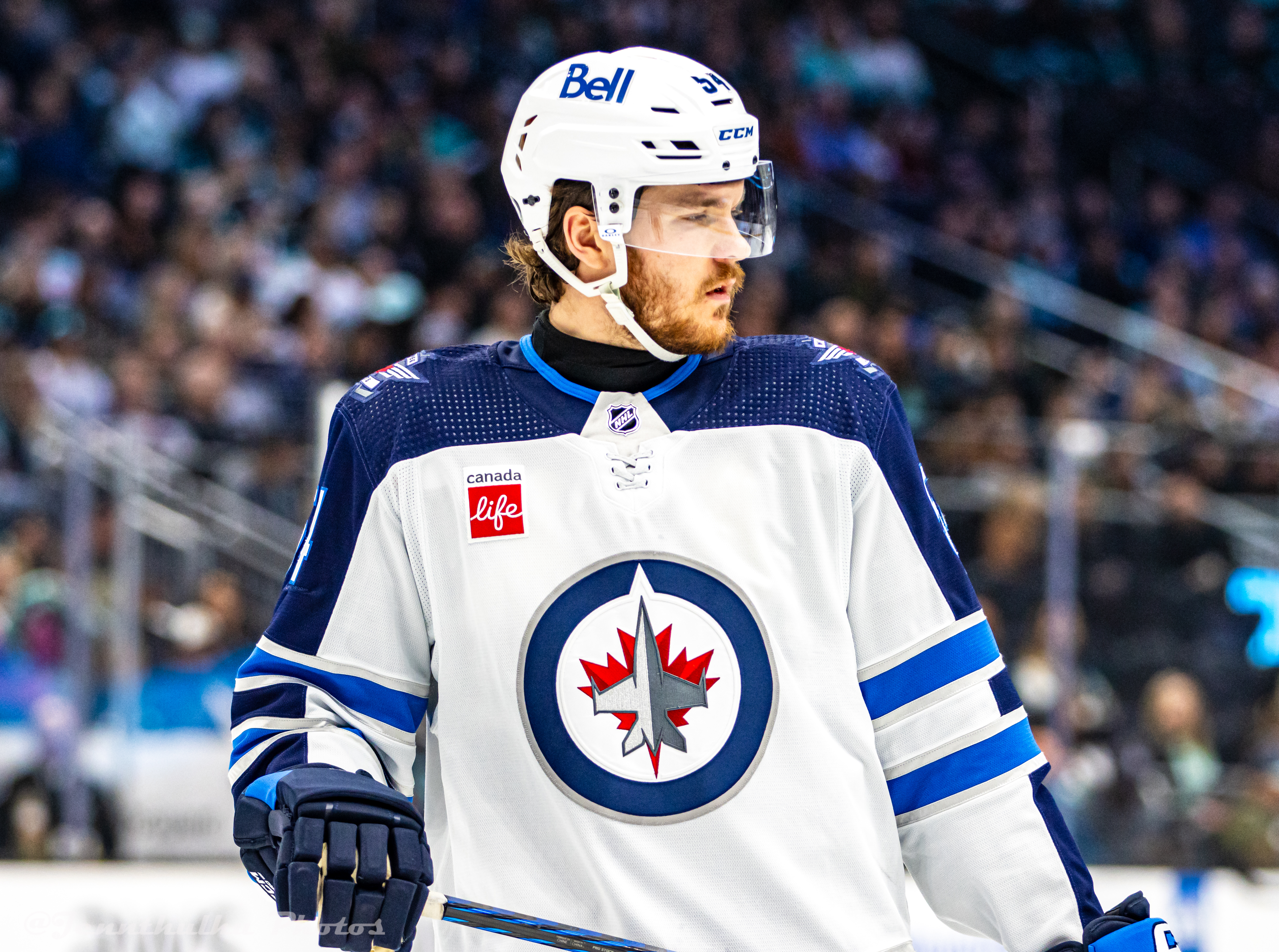
- Samberg with the Winnipeg Jets in March 2024
- Born: January 24, 1999 (age 27) Hermantown, Minnesota, U.S.
- Height: 6 ft 4 in (193 cm)
- Weight: 216 lb (98 kg; 15 st 6 lb)
- Position: Defense
- Shoots: Left
- NHL team: Winnipeg Jets
- National team: United States
- NHL draft: 43rd overall, 2017; Winnipeg Jets
- Playing career: 2021–present

Dylan Michael Samberg (born January 24, 1999) is an American professional ice hockey player who is a defenseman for the Winnipeg Jets of the National Hockey League (NHL).

Growing up in Minnesota, Samberg made his way through the junior prep ranks before enrolling at Hermantown High School. During his time at the school, he captained their hockey team and led them to two Class A state hockey titles. In his senior year, Samberg was a finalist for the Minnesota Mr. Hockey Award and secured the Associated Press All-State (first team), All-Lake Superior Conference and Duluth News-Tribune All-Area honors. He then played 14 games with the Waterloo Black Hawks of the United States Hockey League, recording five points, before being drafted 43rd overall by the Jets during the 2017 NHL entry draft.

Samberg played three seasons with the Minnesota Duluth Bulldogs men's ice hockey at the University of Minnesota Duluth before signing a three-year, entry-level contract with the Jets in April 2020. Samberg immediately joined the Jets' American Hockey League (AHL) affiliate, the Manitoba Moose, for the remainder of the 2020–21 season.

== Early life ==
Samberg was born on January 24, 1999, in Hermantown, Minnesota as the only child of parents Mike and Patty Samberg. Samberg was a multi-sport athlete growing up; beyond hockey, he also played soccer, football, cross-country, baseball and golf.

== Playing career ==
=== Amateur ===
Growing up in Minnesota, Samberg made his way through the junior prep ranks before enrolling at Hermantown High School. During his bantam year, he switched from forward to defence in order to make the team. Although an ankle injury during his sophomore year forced him to miss most of the season, he improved in his junior year and led the team to the Class A state hockey title. After finishing the season with seven goals and 15 assists in 29 games, Samberg was drafted by the Waterloo Black Hawks of the United States Hockey League (USHL). Samberg returned to the Hawks for his senior year where he again led the team to its second consecutive Minnesota Class A Tournament title by scoring the game-winning goal in double overtime to clinch the title. As a result of his play, Samberg was a finalist for the Minnesota Mr. Hockey Award and secured the Associated Press All-State (first team), All-Lake Superior Conference and Duluth News-Tribune All-Area honors. Following the tournament, Samberg played 14 games with the Blackhawks and recorded five points and a plus-5 rating.

Samberg's play during his junior and senior seasons earned him attention from National Hockey League (NHL) scouts. He was originally ranked as a fourth through sixth-rounder by NHL Central Scouting Bureau (CSS) but quickly moved up the official lists throughout the 2016–17 season. His final CSS ranking was 67th amongst all North American skaters. Before starting his collegiate career, Samberg was drafted in the second round of the 2017 NHL entry draft by the Winnipeg Jets and participated in their development camp.

=== College ===
Following the NHL Draft and the Jets' development camp, Samberg joined the Minnesota Duluth Bulldogs men's ice hockey at the University of Minnesota Duluth for the 2017–18 season. Midway through his freshman season, Samberg joined Team USA at the 2018 World Junior Ice Hockey Championships, where he helped them win a bronze medal. At the time of the selection, Samberg had tallied four assists and a minus-5 rating in his first 19 games. Upon returning with a bronze medal, he scored his first collegiate goal and added eight assists to help the Bulldogs reach a second consecutive NCAA Division I men's ice hockey tournament. Upon completing his freshman season, Samberg was again invited to participate at the Jets' summer development camp.

Upon completing his junior season, Samberg concluded his collegiate career by signing a three-year, entry-level contract with the Jets worth an average annual value of $1.175 million.

=== Professional ===
In February 2021, Samberg was assigned to the Jets' American Hockey League (AHL) affiliate, the Manitoba Moose, for the shortened 2020–21 season. In his first professional season, Samberg tallied one goal and six assists through 32 games.

In September 2021, Samberg suffered a high ankle sprain during the Jets' training camp and he was expected to miss six to eight weeks. When he fully recovered, Samberg re-joined the Moose and became top defensive partners with Johnathan Kovacevic. He eventually made his NHL debut on January 13, 2022, in a 3–0 win over the Detroit Red Wings. Samberg played 17:52 in his debut and recorded his first career NHL point, an assist on Andrew Copp's first goal of the game. He played six games with the Jets following his debut, recording two assists, before returning to the AHL. After returning to the Moose, Samberg continued his impressive offensive output as he tallied 12 assists through 32 games. He was eventually recalled on an emergency basis in April 2022. In his first game back at the NHL level, Samberg assisted on both of Morgan Barron's goals to tally two secondary assists in the 4–2 win over the Montreal Canadiens. Once the Jets were eliminated from playoff contention, Samberg returned to the Moose to assist in their 2022 Calder Cup playoffs push.

On November 23, 2024, in a 4–1 loss to the Nashville Predators, Samberg suffered a broken foot from blocking a shot from Predators' forward Steven Stamkos, sidelining him for the foreseeable future.

== Personal life ==
In November 2020, Samberg was involved in a three-vehicle collision in Minnesota after crashing his truck into a parked car on the shoulder of the highway.

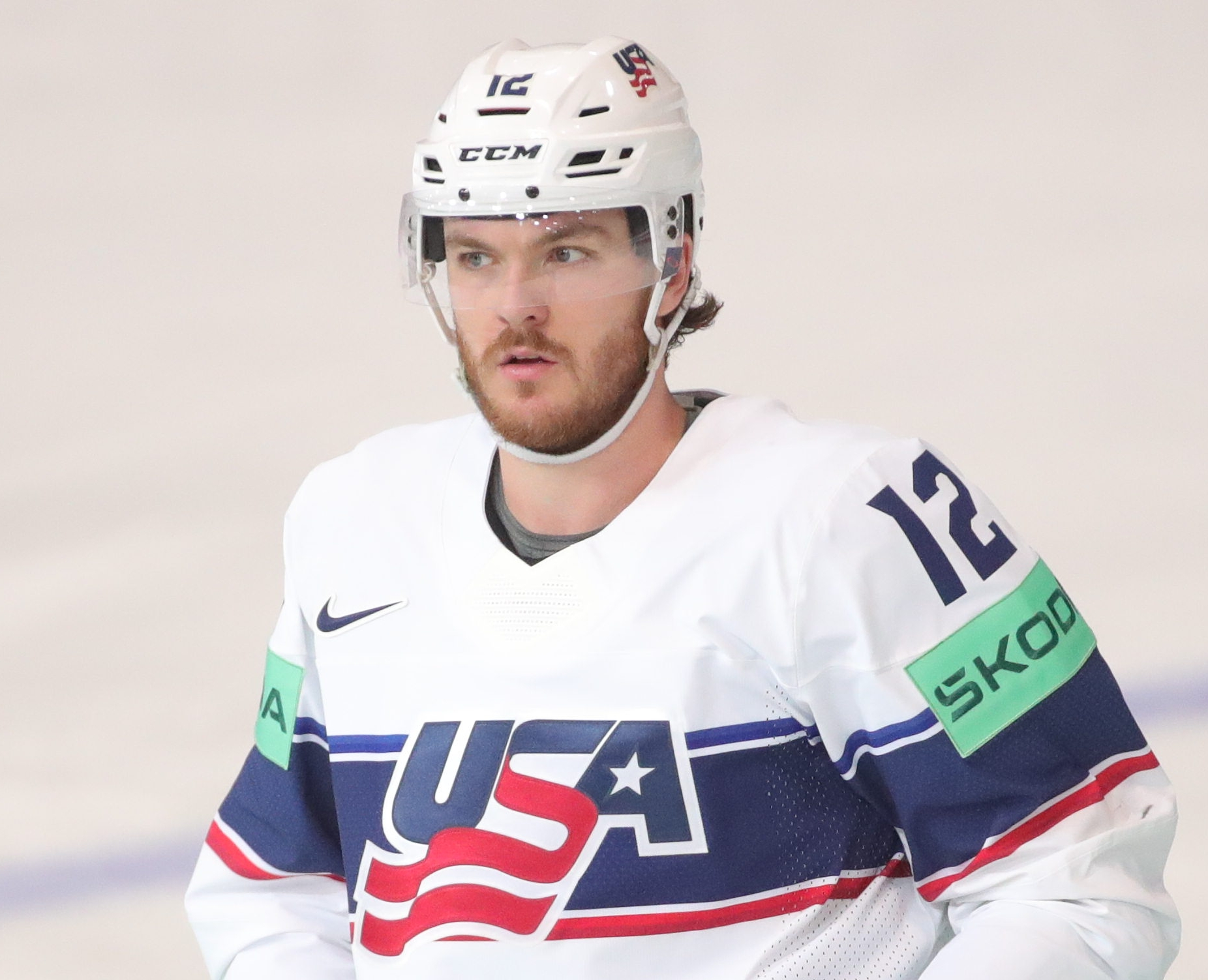
- Samberg with the Team USA in May 2023

Medal record

Representing United States

Ice hockey

World Junior Championships
Silver medal – second place	2019 Canada	
Bronze medal – third place	2018 United States	

== Career statistics ==
=== Regular season and playoffs ===
			Regular season					Playoffs
Season	Team	League	GP	G	A	Pts	PIM	GP	G	A	Pts	PIM
2014–15	Hermantown High	USHS	11	1	0	1	0	3	0	0	0	0
2015–16	Hermantown High	USHS	23	5	13	18	6	3	1	2	3	2
2016–17	Hermantown High	USHS	25	10	18	28	43	3	0	2	2	2
2016–17	Waterloo Black Hawks	USHL	6	1	1	2	0	8	1	2	3	8
2017–18	U. of Minnesota-Duluth	NCHC	42	1	12	13	43	—	—	—	—	—
2018–19	U. of Minnesota-Duluth	NCHC	39	7	12	19	35	—	—	—	—	—
2019–20	U. of Minnesota-Duluth	NCHC	16	0	5	5	14	—	—	—	—	—
2020–21	Manitoba Moose	AHL	32	1	6	7	15	—	—	—	—	—
2021–22	Manitoba Moose	AHL	32	0	12	12	26	5	0	1	1	0
2021–22	Winnipeg Jets	NHL	15	0	5	5	4	—	—	—	—	—
2022–23	Winnipeg Jets	NHL	63	2	6	8	25	5	0	0	0	8
2023–24	Winnipeg Jets	NHL	78	1	17	18	43	5	0	0	0	0
2024–25	Winnipeg Jets	NHL	60	6	14	20	26	13	0	3	3	2
2025–26	Winnipeg Jets	NHL	66	1	13	14	14	—	—	—	—	—
NHL totals			282	10	55	65	112	23	0	3	3	10

=== International ===
Year	Team	Event	Result	GP	G	A	Pts	PIM
2018	United States	WJC	3rd place, bronze medalist(s)	7	1	3	4	8
2019	United States	WJC	2nd place, silver medalist(s)	7	0	2	2	4
2023	United States	WC	4th	10	1	3	4	4
Junior totals				14	1	5	6	12
Senior totals				10	1	3	4	4
