= Otto Koivula =

Finnish ice hockey player

- Born: 1 September 1998 (age 27) Nokia, Finland
- Height: 6 ft 4 in (193 cm)
- Weight: 220 lb (100 kg; 15 st 10 lb)
- Position: Forward
- Shoots: Left
- SHL team Former teams: Växjö Lakers; Ilves; New York Islanders; HIFK
- NHL draft: 120th overall, 2016; New York Islanders
- Playing career: 2016–present

Otto Koivula (born 1 September 1998) is a Finnish professional ice hockey forward for the Växjö Lakers of the Swedish Hockey League (SHL).

== Playing career ==
Koivula began playing within the youth hockey program of Ilves Tampere. After two seasons of Junior A SM-liiga, Koivula secured a two-year Liiga contract with Ilves on 30 March 2016.

Koivula was selected in the fourth round, 120th overall, in the 2016 NHL entry draft by the New York Islanders.

After his second full season in the Liiga in 2017–18, Koivula signed a three-year, entry-level contract with the New York Islanders on 21 March 2018.

In his first season in North America, the Bridgeport Sound Tigers developed Koivula to play center, rather than his natural wing position. He responded with a strong season in a new position, scoring 21 goals and 25 assists for 46 points in 69 games. He received his first NHL call-up on 30 October 2019. Otto played his first NHL game on 16 November 2019, in Philadelphia against the Flyers.

On 9 October 2020, Koivula was loaned to HIFK due to the delayed start of the North American season due to the COVID-19 pandemic. On 20 September 2021, Koivula was re-signed to a one-year contract by the Islanders. On 6 October, he was placed on waivers.

Following the 2023–24 season, Koivula left the Islanders as a pending restricted free agent and returned to Scandinavia in signing a two-year contract with Swedish club, Växjö Lakers of the SHL, on 12 July 2024.

== Career statistics ==
=== Regular season and playoffs ===
			Regular season					Playoffs
Season	Team	League	GP	G	A	Pts	PIM	GP	G	A	Pts	PIM
2014–15	Ilves	Jr. A	22	4	6	10	12	—	—	—	—	—
2015–16	Ilves	Jr. A	49	26	32	58	18	7	5	7	12	4
2015–16	Ilves	Liiga	1	0	0	0	0	—	—	—	—	—
2016–17	Ilves	Liiga	50	10	20	30	6	10	2	3	5	2
2017–18	Ilves	Liiga	53	9	18	27	24	—	—	—	—	—
2018–19	Bridgeport Sound Tigers	AHL	69	21	25	46	28	5	0	2	2	0
2019–20	Bridgeport Sound Tigers	AHL	36	9	13	22	29	—	—	—	—	—
2019–20	New York Islanders	NHL	12	0	0	0	2	—	—	—	—	—
2020–21	HIFK	Liiga	14	3	8	11	10	—	—	—	—	—
2020–21	Bridgeport Sound Tigers	AHL	20	2	7	9	16	—	—	—	—	—
2021–22	Bridgeport Islanders	AHL	56	12	35	47	32	3	0	1	1	6
2021–22	New York Islanders	NHL	8	0	2	2	0	—	—	—	—	—
2022–23	Bridgeport Islanders	AHL	46	12	13	25	37	—	—	—	—	—
2022–23	New York Islanders	NHL	8	0	2	2	4	—	—	—	—	—
2023–24	Bridgeport Islanders	AHL	47	9	21	30	52	—	—	—	—	—
2024–25	Växjö Lakers	SHL	30	5	10	15	14	8	0	3	3	6
Liiga totals			118	22	46	68	40	10	2	3	5	2
NHL totals			28	0	4	4	6	—	—	—	—	—

=== International ===
Year	Team	Event	Result	GP	G	A	Pts	PIM
2015	Finland	IH18	4th	5	1	0	1	6
2017	Finland	WJC	9th	6	0	0	0	0
2018	Finland	WJC	6th	5	0	2	2	4
Junior totals				16	1	2	3	10

== Awards and honours ==
Award	Year
Liiga
Rookie of the Year	2017
