= Marek Zachar =

Czech ice hockey player

- Born: June 11, 1998 (age 27) Liberec, Czech Republic
- Height: 5 ft 9 in (175 cm)
- Weight: 187 lb (85 kg; 13 st 5 lb)
- Position: Forward
- Shoots: Right
- ELH team Former teams: HC Bílí Tygři Liberec; Mountfield HK
- NHL draft: Undrafted
- Playing career: 2015–present

Marek Zachar (born June 11, 1998) is a Czech professional ice hockey player. He is currently playing with HC Bílí Tygři Liberec of the Czech Extraliga (ELH).

Zachar made his Czech Extraliga debut playing with Bílí Tygři Liberec during the 2015-16 Czech Extraliga season. He was drafted by the Sherbrooke Phoenix of the Quebec Major Junior Hockey League (QMJHL) in the second round (72nd overall) of the 2016 CHL Import Draft.
