= Malte Setkov =

Danish ice hockey player (born 1999)

- Born: 14 January 1999 (age 27) Rødovre, Denmark
- Height: 6 ft 7 in (201 cm)
- Weight: 205 lb (93 kg; 14 st 9 lb)
- Position: Defence
- Shoots: Left
- ML team Former teams: Rødovre Mighty Bulls; Malmö Redhawks; AIK IF; Rungsted Seier Capital
- National team: Denmark
- NHL draft: 100th overall, 2017; Detroit Red Wings
- Playing career: 2017–present

Malte Søstrup Setkov (born 14 January 1999) is a Danish professional ice hockey player who is a defenceman for the Rødovre Mighty Bulls of the Metal Ligaen. Setkov was selected by the Detroit Red Wings in the fourth round, 100th overall, of the 2017 NHL entry draft.

== Playing career ==
As a youth in his native Denmark, Setkov played with Rødovre SIK before moving to Sweden as a 15-year old to continue his development within the Malmö Redhawks organization. He was the first Dane blueliner selected in the 2017 NHL entry draft, taken by the Detroit Red Wings in the fourth round, 100th overall.

He made his professional debut in the 2017–18 season, appearing scoreless in a solitary game and was signed to a two-year contract extension on December 11, 2017.

== Career statistics ==
=== Regular season and playoffs ===
			Regular season					Playoffs
Season	Team	League	GP	G	A	Pts	PIM	GP	G	A	Pts	PIM
2015–16	Malmö Redhawks	J20	2	0	0	0	0	—	—	—	—	—
2016–17	Malmö Redhawks	J20	38	2	10	12	18	2	0	0	0	0
2017–18	Malmö Redhawks	J20	14	1	5	6	14	—	—	—	—	—
2017–18	Malmö Redhawks	SHL	1	0	0	0	0	3	0	0	0	0
2017–18	IK Pantern	Allsv	26	0	2	2	8	3	0	2	2	4
2018–19	Malmö Redhawks	J20	13	2	8	10	2	2	0	0	0	4
2018–19	Malmö Redhawks	SHL	13	0	0	0	2	2	1	0	1	0
2018–19	IK Pantern	Allsv	16	0	5	5	4	—	—	—	—	—
2019–20	Malmö Redhawks	SHL	29	1	2	3	8	—	—	—	—	—
2019–20	Kristianstads IK	Allsv	25	5	5	10	18	—	—	—	—	—
2020–21	Malmö Redhawks	SHL	11	0	2	2	4	—	—	—	—	—
2020–21	AIK IF	Allsv	37	5	13	18	22	6	0	2	2	25
2021–22	AIK IF	Allsv	51	4	21	25	21	2	0	0	0	2
2022–23	Rungsted Seier Capital	Denmark	38	3	17	20	22	7	0	1	1	29
2023–24	Rungsted Seier Capital	Denmark	45	6	25	31	41	4	0	1	1	20
2024–25	Rødovre Mighty Bulls	Denmark	38	8	22	30	18	—	—	—	—	—
2024–25	Odense Bulldogs	Denmark	10	1	7	8	2	17	3	11	14	8
2025–26	Rødovre Mighty Bulls	Denmark	44	13	19	32	16	5	2	4	6	2
SHL totals			54	1	4	5	14	5	1	0	1	0
Denmark totals			175	31	90	121	99	33	5	17	22	59

=== International ===
Year	Team	Event	Result	GP	G	A	Pts	PIM
2017	Denmark	WJC18-D1	13th	5	1	1	2	2
2018	Denmark	WJC	9th	6	0	2	2	8
2019	Denmark	WJC	10th	6	1	1	2	2
2026	Denmark	OG	9th	4	0	1	1	2
2026	Denmark	WC	12th	7	0	0	0	6
Junior totals				17	2	4	6	12
Senior totals				11	0	1	1	8
