= Radovan Pavlík =

Czech ice hockey player

Radovan Pavlik
- Born: February 18, 1998 (age 28) Czech Republic
- Height: 5 ft 8 in (173 cm)
- Weight: 148 lb (67 kg; 10 st 8 lb)
- Position: Forward
- Shoots: Left
- Czech team: Mountfield HK
- Playing career: 2015–present

Radovan Pavlik (born February 18, 1998) is a Czech ice hockey player. He is currently playing with Mountfield HK of the Czech Extraliga.

Pavlik made his Czech Extraliga debut playing with Mountfield HK during the 2014–15 Czech Extraliga season.
