= List of German Athletics Championships winners =

The German Athletics Championships (German: Deutsche Leichtathletik-Meisterschaften) is an annual outdoor competition in the sport of athletics organised by the Deutscher Leichtathletik-Verband (DLV), which serves as the German national championship for the sport. The venue of the championships is decided on an annual basis and several events are hosted separately.

The competition was first held in 1898 and women's events were introduced in 1920. Following the division of Germany, the DLV continued to host a national championship from 1946, which served as the West German Athletics Championships, while a separate East German competition was also established. The all-German championship was re-established in 1991, following the reunification of Germany.
