= 1988 West German Athletics Championships =

- Dates: 22–24 July 1988
- Host city: Frankfurt, West Germany
- Venue: Waldstadion
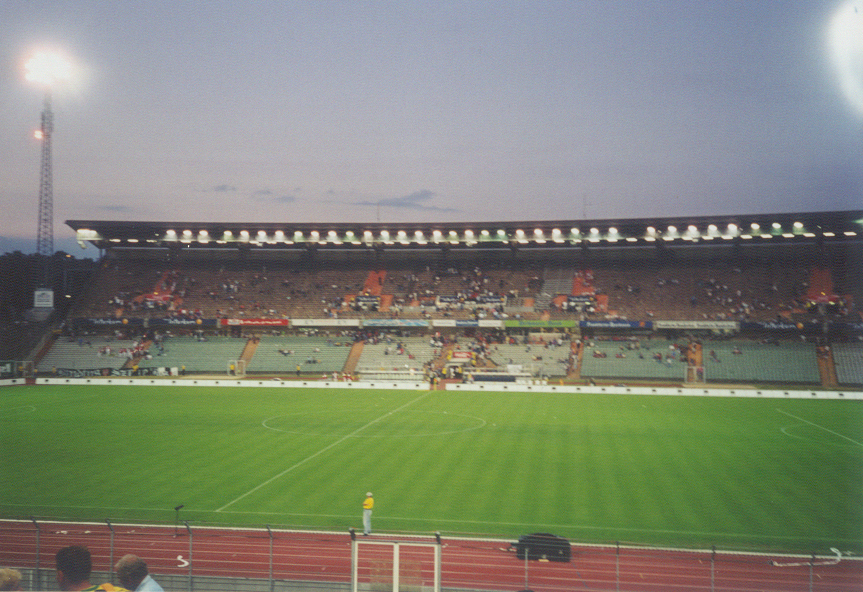
- Events: 38 (track and field) + 32 (others)

The 1988 West German Athletics Championships (German: Deutsche Leichtathletik-Meisterschaften 1988) was the 88th edition of the national championship in outdoor track and field for West Germany. It was held on 22–24 July at the Waldstadion in Frankfurt. It served as the selection meeting for West Germany at the 1988 Summer Olympics.

== Championships ==
As in previous years, national championship titles were awarded in various places besides the main track and field championship.

- Cross country running – Waiblingen, 12 March, with individual and team rankings in long and short course races
- Marathon – Hamburg, 24 April, incorporated into the Hamburg Marathon with individual and team rankings
- Racewalking – Eschborn, 24 April, with individual and team rankings in 10 km walk for women and 50 km walk for men
- Mountain running – Bühlertal in the Black Forest, 1 October, incorporated into the Hundseck-Berglaufs
- Relay – Lübeck, 10 July, incorporated in the German Junior Championships with 3 × 800 m relay for women and 4 × 800 m and 4 × 1500 m for men
- Combined events – Rhede, 9–10 July, with individual and team rankings in men's decathlon and women's heptathlon
- Road running – Herten, 11 September, with individual and team rankings in women's 15 km and men's 25 km
- 100K run – Hamm-Heessen, 8 October with individual rankings for men and women, and a men's team ranking

== Results ==
=== Men ===
| Event | Gold | | Silver | | Bronze | |
|---|---|---|---|---|---|---|
| 100 metres | Andreas Maul; LG Wipperfürth | 10.50 s | Fritz Heer; TV Wattenscheid | 10.50 s | Werner Zaske; TV Wattenscheid | 10.54 s |
| 200 metres | Ralf Lübke; LG Bayer Leverkusen | 20.76 s | Norbert Dobeleit; TV Wattenscheid | 20.88 s | Peter Klein; SV Salamander Kornwestheim | 20.90 s |
| 400 metres | Ralf Lübke; LG Bayer Leverkusen | 45.89 s | Mark Henrich; VfL Kamen | 46.21 s | Jörg Vaihinger; VfL Sindelfingen | 46.25 s |
| 800 metres | Thomas Giessing; LAZ bellanett Rhede | 1:47.52 min | Peter Braun; LG Tuttlingen | 1:47.75 min | Rainer Thau; LC Mengerskirchen | 1:47.88 min |
| 1500 metres | Dieter Baumann; VfL Waiblingen | 3:45.60 min | Eckhardt Rüter; VfL Wolfsburg | 3:46.02 min | Klaus-Peter Nabein; LAC Quelle Fürth | 3:46.44 min |
| 5000 metres | Dieter Baumann; VfL Waiblingen | 13:38.31 min | Steffen Brand; TV Wattenscheid | 13:38.99 min | Martin Grüning; LAV Bayer Uerdingen / Dormagen | 13:46.88 min |
| 10,000 metres | Ralf Salzmann; PSV Grün-Weiß Kassel | 29:01.53 min | Michael Scheytt; LAC München | 29:04.55 min | Herbert Steffny; Post-SV Jahn Freiburg | 29:04.67 min |
| 25 kilometres | Herbert Steffny; Post-SV Jahn Freiburg | 1:15:58 | Konrad Dobler; VfL Waldkraiburg | 1:16:40 | Guido Dold; Post-SV Jahn Freiburg | 1:18:04 |
| 25 kilometres team | Post-SV Jahn Freiburg; Herbert Steffny; Guido Dold; Markus Keller | 3:56:44 | VfL Waldkraiburg; Konrad Dobler; Uwe Hartmann; Joachim Heim | 3:57:33 | LG Frankfurt; Achim Bourmer; Wolfgang Mü; Hans Pfisterer | 3:59:28 |
| Marathon | Udo Reh; VfL Waldkraiburg | 2:14:56 | Konrad Dobler; VfL Waldkraiburg | 2:15:04 | Roland Szymaniak; Gut-Heil Neumünster | 2:17:08 |
| Marathon team | VfL Waldkraiburg; Udo Reh; Konrad Dobler; Joachim Heim | 6:48:28 h | TF Feuerbach; Daniel Bartsch; Peter Maier; Friedrich Mößner | 7:12:04 h | TV Geiselhöring; Winfried Ahlmann; Peter Kiefl; Reinhold Hierlmeier | 7:13:02 h |
| 100 kilometres | Heinz Hüglin; LV Ettenheim | 6:41:41 | Herbert Cuntz; TV Offenbach/Queich | 6:53:40 | Manfred Träger; Triathlon Hub/Nürnberg | 6:59:30 |
| 100 kilometres team | SV Vogt; Richard Fröhlich; Gebhard Bleyer; Willi Thurner | 23:55:07 | SCC Berlin; Hans-Jürgen Seydler; Heinz-Günter Schmidt; Lothar Preißler | 24:22:09 | SuS Schalke 96; Wolfgang Thamm; Bernd Orlowski; Anton Bierner | 24:24:11 |
| 110 m hurdles | Florian Schwarthoff; LG Erlangen | 13.50 s NR | Dietmar Koszewski; SCC Berlin | 13.76 s | Jürgen Schoch; SV Salamander Kornwestheim | 13.76 s |
| 400 m hurdles | Harald Schmid; TV Gelnhausen | 48.23 s | Edgar Itt; TV Gelnhausen | 49.10 s | Uwe Schmitt; Eintracht Frankfurt | 50.44 s |
| 3000 m s'chase | Patriz Ilg; LAC Quelle Fürth | 8:23.19 min | Jens Volkmann; SCC Berlin | 8:23.88 min | Andreas Fischer; Hamburger SV | 8:33.22 min |
| 4 × 100 m relay | LT 1985 Hannover; Dietmar Schulte; Ingo Todt; Holger Isenbart; Volker Nitsch | 39.76 s | SV Salamander Kornwestheim; Jürgen Schoch; Andreas Zügel; Peter Klein; Holger Lutz | 39.87 s | VfL Wolfsburg; Bernd Rebischke; Markus Kessler; Markus Stärk; Erwin Skamrahl | 39.99 s |
| 4 × 400 m relay | LG Bayer Leverkusen; Carsten Fischer; Thomas Geuyen; Michael Grün; Ralf Lübke | 3:06.78 min | VfL Sindelfingen; Peter Mayer; Claus Krafzik; Martin Bürkle; Jörg Vaihinger | 3:07.18 min | Eintracht Frankfurt; Lars Klingenberg; Frank Seybold; Uwe Schmitt; Bodo Kuhn | 3:07.26 min |
| 4 × 800 m relay | LG Nord Berlin; Ingo Plucinski; Helge Loska; Bernd Müller; Holger Böttcher | 7:19.13 min | ASV Köln; Martin Stötzel; Blieschies; Dirk Cordier; Alexander Adam | 7:19.57 min | TV Wattenscheid; Knut Vollenbröker; Torsten Rostock; Michael Schreckenberger; Harald Andrä | 7:19.99 min |
| 4 × 1500 m relay | VfL Wolfsburg; Dehlke; Wolfgang Schreiber; Jens Becker; Eckhard Rüter | 15:19.63 min | TV Wattenscheid; Christof Blum; Brehm; Volker Welzel; Steffen Brand | 15:20.88 min | LG Bayer Leverkusen; Burkhard Dahm; Ernst Ludwig; Mathias Kohls; Frank Casper | 15:21.69 min |
| 20 km walk | Torsten Zervas; Eintracht Frankfurt | 1:30:01 | Volkmar Scholz; Berliner SV 1892 | 1:30:16 | Wolfgang Wiedemann; LAC Quelle Fürth | 1:32:52 |
| 20 km walk team | LAC Quelle Fürth; Wolfgang Wiedemann; Robert Mildenberger; Alfons Schwarz | 4:52:06 | Berliner SV 1892; Volkmar Scholz; Andreas Hühmer; Detlev Winkler | 4:42:33 | Eintracht Frankfurt; Torsten Zervas; Franz-Josef Weber; Hans Michalski | 4:51:06 |
| 50 km walk | Alfons Schwarz; LAC Quelle Fürth | 3:56:14 | Detlef Heitmann; LGU Brake | 4:05:32 | Robert Mildenberger; LAC Quelle Fürth | 4:06:27 |
| 50 km walk team | LAC Quelle Fürth; Alfons Schwarz; Robert Mildenberger; Wolfgang Wiedemann | 12:26:19 | Eintracht Frankfurt; Torsten Zervas; Hans Michalski; Heinrich Hänsel | 12:54:50 | Meiendorfer SV; Fritz Helms; Braun; Steinhardt | 13:50:15 |
| High jump | Dietmar Mögenburg; OSC Berlin | 2.25 m | Gerd Nagel; Eintracht Frankfurt | 2.25 m | André Schneider-Laub; TV Wattenscheid | 2.22 m |
| Pole vault | Władysław Kozakiewicz; TK Hannover | 5.40 m | Bernhard Zintl; LG München | 5.30 m | Jürgen Winkler; TV Wattenscheid | 5.30 m |
| Long jump | Dietmar Haaf; SV Salamander Kornwestheim | 7.83 m | Christian Thomas; TV Heppenheim | 7.82 m | Heiko Reski; LG Bayer Leverkusen | 7.73 m |
| Triple jump | Wolfgang Knabe; TV Wattenscheid | 17.31 m | Wolfgang Zinser; TV Wattenscheid | 17.00 m | Wolfgang Mai; FC Schalke 04 | 16.39 m |
| Shot put | Karsten Stolz; TV Wattenscheid | 20.18 m | Wolfgang Schmidt; Stuttgarter Kickers | 19.41 m | Udo Gelhausen; LG Bayer Leverkusen | 19.37 m |
| Discus throw | Rolf Danneberg; LG Wedel Pinneberg | 67.20 m | Wolfgang Schmidt; Stuttgarter Kickers | 65.08 m | Alwin Wagner; USC Mainz | 64.70 m |
| Hammer throw | Heinz Weis; LG Bayer Leverkusen | 79.58 m | Norbert Radefeld; VfL Wolfsburg | 77.48 m | Jörg Schaefer; TV Wattenscheid | 76.44 m |
| Javelin throw | Peter Blank; LG Frankfurt | 80.84 m | Peter Schreiber; LG Bayer Leverkusen | 75.42 m | Knut Hempel; Hamburger SV | 75.14 m |
| Decathlon | Rainer Sonnenburg; LG Wedel Pinneberg | 8025 pts | Karl-Heinz Fichtner; LC Olympiapark München | 8000 pts | Gerald Borchert; Hamburger SV | 7887 pts |
| Decathlon team | LC Olympiapark München; Karl-Heinz Fichtner; Bruno Chirco; Stefan Winkler | 22,904 pts | SG Ulm; Norbert Demmel; Ralf Oberhofer; Hans Joachim Häberle | 22,331 pts | Hamburger SV; Gerald Borchert; Torsten Bielert; Andreas Kortmann | 22,101 pts |
| Cross country short course – 3.4 km | Uwe Mönkemeyer; TV Wattenscheid | 10:51 min | Steffen Brand; TV Wattenscheid | 10:54 min | Klaus Heiserer; Stuttgarter Kickers | 10:56 min |
| Cross country short course, Team | TV Wattenscheid; Uwe Mönkemeyer; Steffen Brand; Volker Welzel | 8 | LG Frankfurt; Ulrich Keil; Peter Wagner; Tölke | 73 | TV Bad Bergzabern; Michael Spindler; Stephan Werling; Markus Schwamm | 73 |
| Cross country long course – 10.2 km | Christoph Herle; VfL Waldkraiburg | 33:18 min | Konrad Dobler; VfL Waldkraiburg | 33:25 min | Franz Engelbert; VfL Waldkraiburg | 33:29 min |
| Cross country long course, Team | VfL Waldkraiburg; Christoph Herle; Konrad Dobler; Engelbert Franz | 6 | LAC München; Michael Scheytt; Winfried Prohl; Michael Spöttel | 53 | LG Bayer Leverkusen; Axel Hardy; Mathias Kohls; Ernst Ludwig | 61 |
| Mountain running | Charly Doll; Freiburger FC | 40:25 min | Wolfgang Münzel; LG Frankfurt | 40:56 min | Meinrad Beha; FC Unterkirnach | 41:07 min |

=== Women ===
| Event | Gold | | Silver | | Bronze | |
|---|---|---|---|---|---|---|
| 100 metres | Ulrike Sarvari; VfL Sindelfingen | 11.28 s | Andrea Thomas; VfL Sindelfingen | 11.35 s | Sabine Richter; Eintracht Frankfurt | 11.50 s |
| 200 metres | Andrea Thomas; VfL Sindelfingen | 22.82 s | Ute Thimm; TV Wattenscheid | 23.00 s | Helga Arendt; SC Eintracht Hamm | 23.13 s |
| 400 metres | Helga Arendt; SC Eintracht Hamm | 50.77 s | Ute Thimm; TV Wattenscheid | 51.33 s | Karin Janke; VfL Wolfsburg | 52.59 s |
| 800 metres | Gabriela Lesch; Eintracht Frankfurt | 2:02.07 min | Ute Lix; TV Gelnhausen | 2:04.45 min | Astrid Bartels; LG Nordwest Hamburg | 2:04.77 min |
| 1500 metres | Vera Michallek; LG Frankfurt | 4:12.41 min | Brigitte Kraus; ASV Köln | 4:15.84 min | Susanne Niemeyer; TG Schweinfurt | 4:23.68 min |
| 3000 metres | Vera Michallek; LG Frankfurt | 9:05.77 min | Claudia Borgschulze; SC Eintracht Hamm | 9:07.44 min | Sabine Kunkel; VfL Wolfsburg | 9:10.87 min |
| 10,000 metres | Kerstin Preßler; Neuköllner Sportfreunde | 33:31.37 min | Claudia Borgschulze; SC Eintracht Hamm | 33:43.36 min | Antje Winkelmann; LG Göttingen | 34:10.05 min |
| 15 kilometres | Christa Vahlensieck; Barmer TV 1846 Wuppertal | 51:31 min | Iris Biba; DJK Freigericht | 52:16 min | Annabel Holtkamp; ASV Köln | 52:53 min |
| 15 kilometres team | LG Bayer Leverkusen; Britta Lorch; Sabine Knetsch; Silvia Merten | 2:43:22 | LG Seesen; Ursula Starke; Doris Grossert; Karola Weiglein | 2:46:04 | SKV Eglosheim; Veronika Manz; Inge Röhrnbacher; Sabine Kauf | 2:49:10 |
| Marathon | Charlotte Teske; ASC Darmstadt | 2:30:23 | Kerstin Preßler; Neuköllner Sportfreunde | 2:30:27 | Gabriela Wolf; LAV co op Dortmund | 2:31:56 |
| Marathon team | LAV co op Dortmund; Gabriela Wolf; Jutta Karsch; Bernadette Hudy | 8:12:05 h | SKV Eglosheim; Inge Röhrnbacher; Monika Bösing; Sabine Kauf | 8:18:28 h | LG Seesen; Ursula Starke; Doris Grossert; Gudrun Tünnermann | 8:36:34 h |
| 100 kilometres | Birgit Lennartz; ASV Sankt Augustin | 7:42:00 h | Iris Reuter; SSC Hanau-Rodenbach | 7:56:20 h | Sigrid Lomsky; SCC Berlin | 8:13:20 h |
| 100 m hurdles | Claudia Zaczkiewicz; MTG Mannheim | 12.87 s | Ulrike Denk; LG Bayer Leverkusen | 12.95 s | Gabi Lippe; MTG Mannheim | 13.10 s |
| 400 m hurdles | Gudrun Abt; TSV Genkingen | 55.16 s | Sabine Alber; LG Kappelberg | 56.75 s | Sandra Seuser; SC Brandenburg Berlin | 57.13 s |
| 4 × 100 m relay | VfL Sindelfingen; Margrit Schiller; Anke Köninger; Andrea Thomas; Ulrike Sarvari | 43.52 s | SC Eintracht Hamm; Andrea Hannemann; Mechthild Kluth; Silke-Beate Knoll; Andrea Arendt | 43.58 s | LAV Bayer Uerdingen / Dormagen; Steffen; Ina Cordes; Britta Knickenberg; Karin Wiesel | 45.34 s |
| 4 × 400 m relay | SC Eintracht Hamm; Mechthild Kluth; Silke-Beate Knoll; Gaby Bußmann; Helga Arendt | 3:35.24 min | LG Kappelberg; Heike Bek; Silke Fischer; Astrid Rinklef; Sabine Alber | 3:40.55 min | LG Nord Berlin; Cornelia Bahls; Claudia Beulke; Marlies Keil; Ines Conradi | 3:40.88 min |
| 3 × 800 m relay | ASV Köln; Roswitha Gerdes; Sonja Kaufmann; Brigitte Kraus | 6:19.08 min | Eintracht Frankfurt; Maren Isigkeit; Uta Eckhardt; Gabriela Lesch | 6:25.58 min | LG Nord Berlin; Mann; Claudia Beulke; Cornelia Bahls | 6:28.45 min |
| 10 km walk | Barbara Kollorz; LG OSC/TSG Osnabrück | 49:24 min | Catrin Rudolph; Eintracht Frankfurt | 49:26 min | Brigitte Buck; LG Mainburg-Niederaichbach | 49:47 min |
| 10 km walk team | LG Mainburg-Niederaichbach; Brigitte Buck; Renate Warz; Gabi Daffner | 2:34:45 h | LAV co op Dortmund; Adelheid Zschieschang; Cirsten Verleger; Margot Jessat | 2:39:32 h | TV 1846 Groß-Gerau; Leni Demmel; Ellen Maus; Nicole Best | 2:47:36 h |
| High jump | Heike Redetzky; LG Bayer Leverkusen | 1.97 m | Silvia Oswald; LAV Bayer Uerdingen / Dormagen | 1.88 m | Christiane Mergemann; MTV Celle | 1.88 m |
| Long jump | Andrea Hannemann; SC Eintracht Hamm | 6.55 m | Stephanie Hühn; LG Nordwest Hamburg | 6.45 m | Silke Harms; TV Stelle | 6.39 m |
| Shot put | Claudia Losch; LAC Quelle Fürth | 19.84 m | Stephanie Storp; TV Wattenscheid | 19.73 m | Vera Schmidt; MTV Ingolstadt | 19.46 m |
| Discus throw | Dagmar Galler; LG Bayer Leverkusen | 62.60 m | Barbara Beuge; MTV Ingolstadt | 59.52 m | Ursula Kreutel; Stuttgarter Kickers | 58.76 m |
| Javelin throw | Ingrid Thyssen; LG Bayer Leverkusen | 63.68 m | Brigitte Graune; LG Bayer Leverkusen | 62.84 m | Manuela Alizadeh; LAV Bayer Uerdingen / Dormagen | 60.90 m |
| Heptathlon | Sabine Everts; LAV Bayer Uerdingen / Dormagen | 6306 pts | Birgit Clarius; MTV Ingolstadt | 6204 pts | Sabine Braun; TV Wattenscheid | 6202 pts |
| Heptathlon team | LG Bayer Leverkusen; Renate Pfeil; Antje Schmuck; Dagmar Federwisch | 17,276 pts | LAV Bayer Uerdingen / Dormagen; Sabine Everts; Karin Wiesel; Christiane Blum | 16,961 pts | LG Nordwest Hamburg; Stefanie Hühn; Ute Niendorf; Schmidt | 16,650 pts |
| Cross country short course – 2.7 km | Ursula Starke; LG Seesen | 9:11 min | Ute Haak; LAC Quelle Fürth | 9:12 min | Sabine Kunkel; VfL Wolfsburg | 9:15 min |
| Cross country short course, Team | LG Frankfurt; Heidrun Vetter; Vera Michallek; Gabriele Huber | 24 | ASV Köln; Roswitha Gerdes; Annabel Holtkamp; Braun | 43 | LC Olympiapark München; Rita Marquardt; Birgit Wiedenmann; Simone Lang | 70 |
| Cross country long course – 6.8 km | Antje Winkelmann; LG Göttingen | 25:29 min | Astrid Schmidt; LAV Aschaffenburg | 25:48 min | Sabine Knetsch; LG Bayer Leverkusen | 25:50 min |
| Cross country long course, Team | LAV co op Dortmund; Jutta Hellmich; Gabriela Wolf; Christina Mai | 22 | LG Göttingen; Antje Winkelmann; Almut Potschka; Christiane Finke | 23 | SCC Berlin; Edith Krause; Angela Wilhelm; Hohenhaus | 35 |
| Mountain running | Birgit Lennartz; ASV Sankt Augustin | 48:47 min | Bernadette Hudy; LAV co op Dortmund | 51:06 min | Christiane Fladt; TV Isny | 51:32 min |
