= Reski =

Reski is a surname. Notable people with this surname include:

- Heiko Reski (born 1963), German long jumper
- Petra Reski (born 1958), German journalist
- Ralf Reski (born 1958), German biologist
