= 1987 World Championships in Athletics – Men's long jump =

These are the official results of the men's long jump event at the 1987 IAAF World Championships in Rome, Italy. There were a total number of 40 participating athletes, with two qualifying groups and the final held on Saturday 5 September 1987.

Giovanni Evangelisti of Italy originally won the bronze with a jump of 8.38 m, but it was later determined that Italian field officials had entered a fake result for a jump of 7.85m. Larry Myricks of the United States received the bronze medal nine months later.

== Medalists ==
Gold	Carl Lewis; United States (USA)
Silver	Robert Emmiyan; Soviet Union (URS)
Bronze	Larry Myricks; United States (USA)

== Schedule ==
- All times are Central European Time (UTC+1)

Qualification Round
Group A	Group B
04.09.1987 – ??:??h	04.09.1987 – ??:??h
Final Round
05.09.1987 – ??:??h

== Records ==
Existing records at the start of the event.

World Record	Bob Beamon (USA)	8.90	Mexico City, Mexico	18 October 1968
Championship Record	Carl Lewis (USA)	8.55	Helsinki, Finland	10 August 1983

== Qualifying round ==
- Held on Friday 1987-09-04

RANK	GROUP A	DISTANCE
1.	Robert Emmiyan (URS)	8.19 m
2.	Paul Emordi (NGR)	8.14 m
3.	Vladimir Bobylyov (URS)	8.08 m
4.	Jarmo Kärnä (FIN)	8.06 m
5.	Junichi Usui (JPN)	8.02 m
6.	Jaime Jefferson (CUB)	8.00 m
7.	Mike Conley (USA)	7.99 m
8.	Norbert Brige (FRA)	7.96 m
9.	Frans Maas (NED)	7.78 m
10.	Róbert Széli (TCH)	7.59 m
11.	Dietmar Haaf (GER)	7.51 m
12.	Ray Quiñones (PUR)	7.41 m
13.	Jeffrey Neptune (GRN)	7.11 m
14.	Marcus César Barros (BRA)	6.94 m
15.	Devon Hyde (BIZ)	6.61 m
—	António Santos (ANG)	NM
—	Stanisław Jaskułka (POL)	NM
—	Bruny Surin (CAN)	NM
—	Dimitrios Chatzopoulos (GRE)	NM
—	Lester Benjamin (ATG)	NM

RANK	GROUP B	DISTANCE
1.	Carl Lewis (USA)	8.36 m
2.	Larry Myricks (USA)	8.20 m
3.	Jens Hirschberg (GDR)	8.10 m
4.	Yusuf Alli (NGR)	8.07 m
5.	Vladimir Amidzhinov (BUL)	8.05 m
6.	Heiko Reski (FRG)	8.03 m
7.	Sergey Layevskiy (URS)	7.98 m
8.	Giovanni Evangelisti (ITA)	7.97 m
9.	Ivo Krsek (TCH)	7.96 m
10.	Emiel Mellaard (NED)	7.93 m
11.	Chen Zunrong (CHN)	7.90 m
12.	Andreas Steiner (AUT)	7.87 m
13.	Fred Salle (CMR)	7.60 m
14.	Antonio Corgos (ESP)	7.60 m
15.	Ian James (CAN)	7.54 m
16.	Badara Mbengue (SEN)	7.23 m
17.	Carlos Casar (MEX)	7.21 m
18.	Wilbert Lee (MNT)	6.61 m
—	Jeroen Fischer (BEL)	DNS
—	Kim Won-jin (KOR)	DNS

== Final ==
Rank	Athlete	Attempts						Distance	Note
Rank	Athlete	1	2	3	4	5	6	Distance	Note
1st place, gold medalist(s)	Carl Lewis (USA)	8.67	8.65	8.67	8.43	X	8.60	8.67 m	CR
2nd place, silver medalist(s)	Robert Emmiyan (URS)	8.30	X	X	8.53	X	X	8.53 m	
3rd place, bronze medalist(s)	Larry Myricks (USA)	X	8.04w	8.23	8.13	8.33	8.20	8.33 m	
4	Giovanni Evangelisti (ITA)	X	8.09	8.19	7.59	X	~~8.38~~	8.19 m	
5	Jens Hirschberg (GDR)	8.16	8.04	7.97	7.85	X	7.95	8.16 m	
6	Jaime Jefferson (CUB)	7.78	7.85	8.09	8.04	7.84	8.14	8.14 m	
7	Vladimir Amidzhinov (BUL)	8.11	7.80	8.05	7.86	7.99	8.01	8.11 m	
8	Mike Conley (USA)	X	8.10	X	X	X	X	8.10 m	
9	Sergey Layevskiy (URS)							8.08 m	
10	Heiko Reski (FRG)							8.03 m	
11	Yusuf Alli (NGR)							8.00 m	
12	Junichi Usui (JPN)							8.00 m	
13	Vladimir Bobylyov (URS)							7.90 m	
14	Jarmo Kärnä (FIN)							7.83 m	
15	Norbert Brige (FRA)							7.82 m	
16	Paul Emordi (NGR)							7.80 m	
17	Ivo Krsek (TCH)							7.72 m	

== See also ==
- 1983 Men's World Championships Long Jump (Helsinki)
- 1984 Men's Olympic Long Jump (Los Angeles)
- 1986 Men's European Championships Long Jump (Stuttgart)
- 1988 Men's Olympic Long Jump (Seoul)
- 1990 Men's European Championships Long Jump (Split)
