= 1988 East German Athletics Championships =

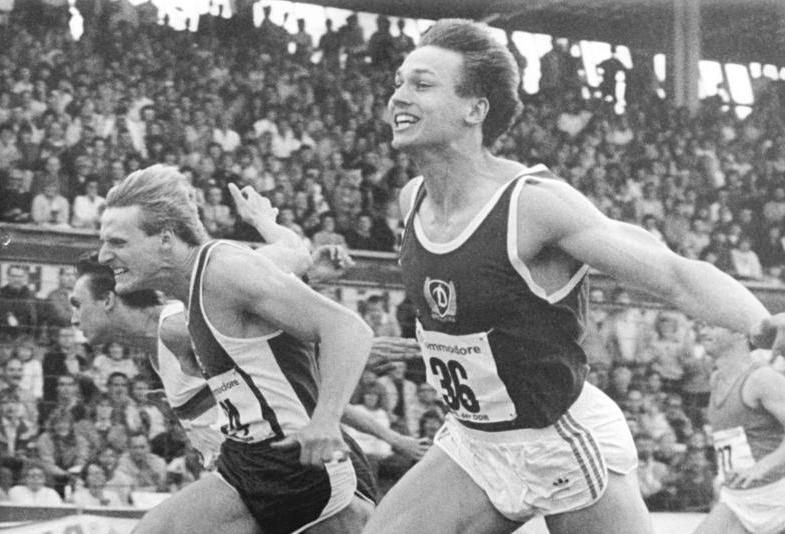
- Sprinter Sven Matthes (right) winning the men's 100 metres
- Dates: 24–26 June 1988
- Host city: Rostock, East Germany
- Venue: Ostseestadion
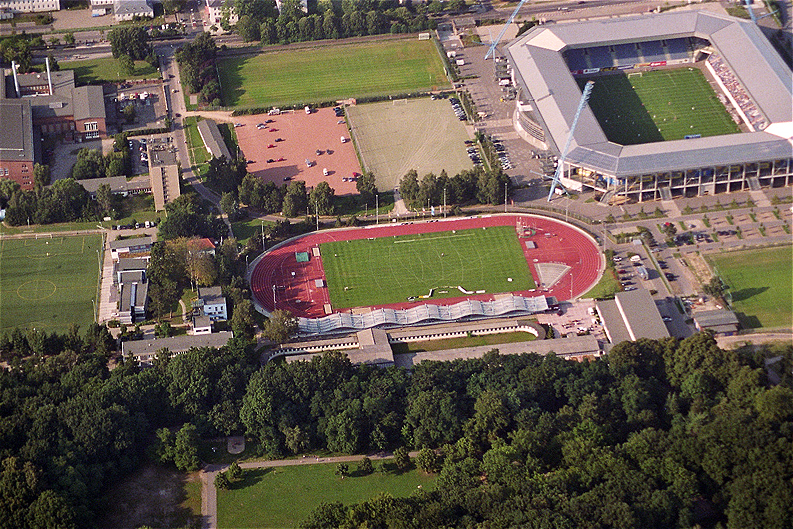

The 1988 East German Athletics Championships (German: DDR-Leichtathletik-Meisterschaften 1988) was the 39th edition of the national championship in outdoor track and field for East Germany. It was held on 24–26 June at the Ostseestadion in Rostock. It served as the selection meeting for East Germany at the 1988 Summer Olympics.

At the competition, Sven Matthes set a new European junior record of 10.18 in the men's 100 metres qualifying, Anke Schäning set a world junior record of 32:44.52 minutes in the women's 10,000 metres, and Beate Anders broke the senior German record in the women's 5000 metres race walk with 21:35.28 minutes.

== Results ==
=== Men ===
Event	Gold		Silver		Bronze	
100 metres	Sven Matthes; SC Dynamo Berlin	10.19 s	Steffen Bringmann; SC DHfK Leipzig	10.21 s	Frank Emmelmann; SC Magdeburg	10.26 s
200 metres	Frank Emmelmann; SC Magdeburg	20.37 s	Olaf Prenzler; SC Magdeburg	20.73 s	Torsten Heimrath; SC Traktor Schwerin	20.89 s
400 metres	Thomas Schönlebe; SC Karl-Marx-Stadt	45.56 s	Mathias Schersing; SC Chemie Halle	46.15 s	Jens Carlowitz; SC Karl-Marx-Stadt	46.20 s
800 metres	Ralf Schumann; SC Traktor Schwerin	1:47.38 min	Jürgen Herms; SC Einheit Dresden	1:47.99 min	Jens Behmer; SC Neubrandenburg	1:48.21 min
1500 metres	Jens-Peter Herold; ASK Vorwärts Potsdam	3:46.62 min	Andreas Busse; SC Einheit Dresden	3:47.29 min	Ivo Schutte; SC Cottbus	3:47.51 min
5000 metres	Axel Krippschock; SC Dynamo Berlin	13:48.63 min	Werner Schildhauer; SC Chemie Halle	13:48.87 min	Olaf Dorow; SC Empor Rostock	13:49.49 min
10,000 metres	Hansjörg Kunze; SC Empor Rostock	27:55.85 min	Axel Krippschock; SC Dynamo Berlin	28:03.51 min	Rainer Wachenbrunner; SC Dynamo Berlin	28:19.94 min
Marathon	Rainer Wachenbrunner; SC Dynamo Berlin	2:17:19.6	Roland Günther; SC Magdeburg	2:21:46.7	Enrico Rösner; BSG Motor Ammendorf	2:27:18.2
110 m hurdles	Holger Pohland; SC DHfK Leipzig	13.67 s	Andreas Oschkenat; SC Dynamo Berlin	13.70 s	Jörg Rölz; SC Neubrandenburg	14.18 s
400 m hurdles	Uwe Ackermann; SC Karl-Marx-Stadt	50.15 s	Hans-Joachim Ende; SC Magdeburg	50.68 s	Volker Thiel; SC Motor Jena	51.74 s
3000 m s'chase	Hagen Melzer; SC Einheit Dresden	8:19.22 min	Frank Ruhkieck; SC Traktor Schwerin	8:32.51 min	Uwe Pflügner; SC Turbine Erfurt	8:39.18 min
4 × 100 m relay	SC Motor Jena; Jörg Treffer; Jens Heinrich; Gerd Umlauft; Heiko Truppel	40.09 s	SC Dynamo Berlin; Lars Olbrich; Sven Matthes; Svend Maly; Andreas Oschkenat	40.12 s	SC Karl-Marx-Stadt; Arne Rinckleb; Axel Jang; Jens Carlowitz; Thomas Schönlebe	40.17 s
4 × 400 m relay	SC Karl-Marx-Stadt; Rico Lieder; Uwe Ackermann; Jens Carlowitz; Thomas Schönlebe	3:06.38 min	ASK Vorwärts Potsdam; Ralph Walter; Lukas; Guido Lieske; Thomas Miethig	3:09.13 min	SC Turbine Erfurt; Michael Gerlach; Andreas Tschida; Hauke Fuhlbrügge; Matthias Schober	3:12.22 min
20 km walk	Ronald Weigel; ASK Vorwärts Potsdam	1:20:57	Bernd Gummelt; ASK Vorwärts Potsdam	1:21:45	Dietmar Meisch; TSC Berlin	1:22:15
50 km walk	Ronald Weigel; ASK Vorwärts Potsdam	3:42:33	Dietmar Meisch; TSC Berlin	3:46:55	Bernd Gummelt; ASK Vorwärts Potsdam	4:00:10
High jump	Gerd Wessig; SC Traktor Schwerin	2.26 m	Thorsten Marschner; SC Einheit Dresden	2.14 m	Carsten Siebert; SC Cottbus	2.14 m
Pole vault	Uwe Langhammer; SC Motor Jena	5.60 m	Christoph Pietz; SC Dynamo Berlin	5.40 m	Enrico Mann; SC Cottbus	5.40 m
Long jump	Ron Beer; SC Dynamo Berlin	7.92 m	Jörg Pohl; SC Empor Rostock	7.81 m	Andre Reichelt; SC Einheit Dresden	7.80 m
Triple jump	Volker Mai; SC Neubrandenburg	16.80 m	Dirk Gamlin; SC Traktor Schwerin	16.66 m	Thomas Rex; SC Turbine Erfurt	16.24 m
Shot put	Ulf Timmermann; TSC Berlin	21.88 m	Udo Beyer; ASK Vorwärts Potsdam	20.92 m	Klaus Görmer; SC DHfK Leipzig	19.50 m
Discus throw	Jürgen Schult; SC Traktor Schwerin	66.92 m	Andreas Becker; SC Empor Rostock	62.60 m	Lutz Friedrich; SC Karl-Marx-Stadt	60.96 m
Hammer throw	Ralf Haber; SC Karl-Marx-Stadt	80.30 m	Günther Rodehau; SC Einheit Dresden	79.04 m	Jörn Hübner; SC Cottbus	74.38 m
Javelin throw	Silvio Warsönke; SC Cottbus	82.64 m	Gerald Weiß; SC Traktor Schwerin	81.92 m	Steffen Kauerauf; SC DHfK Leipzig	76.64 m
Decathlon	Uwe Freimuth; ASK Vorwärts Potsdam	8290 pts	Thomas Fahner; ASK Vorwärts Potsdam	8276 pts	Christian Schenk; SC Empor Rostock	8225 pts

=== Women ===
Event	Gold		Silver		Bronze	
100 metres	Marlies Göhr; SC Motor Jena	11.07 s	Silke Möller; SC Empor Rostock	11.07 s	Ingrid Lange; SC Motor Jena	11.39 s
200 metres	Heike Drechsler; SC Motor Jena	21.84 s	Silke Möller; SC Empor Rostock	22.30 s	Heike Morgenstern; ASK Vorwärts Potsdam	22.81 s
400 metres	Petra Müller; SC Chemie Halle	50.26 s	Kirsten Emmelmann; SC Magdeburg	50.99 s	Dagmar Neubauer; SC Turbine Erfurt	51.20 s
800 metres	Christine Wachtel; SC Neubrandenburg	1:58.29 min	Sigrun Wodars; SC Neubrandenburg	1:58.65 min	Martina Steuk; TSC Berlin	1:59.95 min
1500 metres	Birgit Barth; SC Dynamo Berlin	4:09.33 min	Andrea Hahmann; ASK Vorwärts Potsdam	4:09.77 min	Ellen Kiessling; SC Einheit Dresden	4:09.93 min
3000 metres	Kathrin Ullrich; SC Dynamo Berlin	8:48.80 min	Ellen Kiessling; SC Einheit Dresden	9:05.87 min	Gabriele Meinel; SC Cottbus	9:07.13 min
10,000 metres	Kathrin Ullrich; SC Dynamo Berlin	31:26.79 min	Anke Schäning; SC Empor Rostock	32:44.52 min WJR	Birgit Jerschabek; SC Traktor Schwerin	33:29.33 min
Marathon	Andrea Fleischer; SC Motor Jena	2:49:50.1	Kristina Garlipp; SC Motor Jena	2:52:00.1	Kerstin Herzberg; SC Motor Jena	2:53:34.5
100 m hurdles	Cornelia Oschkenat; SC Dynamo Berlin	12.52 s	Kerstin Knabe; SC DHfK Leipzig	12.80 s	Kristin Patzwahl; SC DHfK Leipzig	12.95 s
400 m hurdles	Sabine Busch; SC Turbine Erfurt	54.11 s	Ellen Fiedler; SC Dynamo Berlin	54.74 s	Susanne Losch; SC Turbine Erfurt	54.89 s
4 × 100 m relay	SC Motor Jena; Karina Knuhr; Sabine Günther; Ingrid Lange; Marlies Göhr	43.40 s	SC Magdeburg; Annette Kersten; Manuela Braun; Diana Dietz; Heike Theele	44.04 s	SC Neubrandenburg; Doreen Fahrendorff; Katrin Krabbe; Manuela Derr; Grit Breuer	44.12 s
4 × 400 m relay	SC Turbine Erfurt; Katrin Schreiter; Dagmar Neubauer; Daniela Steinecke; Susanne Losch	3:29.12 min	SC Magdeburg; Stefanie Fabert; Cornelia Ullrich; Heike Tillack; Kati Bohmeier	3:38.99 min	SC Dynamo Berlin; Constanze Taube; Andrea Dittner; Beate Kuhls; Ulrike Schmiedel	3:49.06 min
5000 m walk	Beate Anders; TSC Berlin	21:35.28 min NR	Dagmar Grimmenstein; SC Turbine Erfurt	22:58.61 min	Simone Thust; SC DHfK Leipzig	23:05 min
10 km walk	Beate Anders; TSC Berlin	46:28 min	Claudia Barthel; BSG Lokomotive Magdeburg	58:35 min	Antje Kahr; BSG Lokomotive Wittenberge	1:00:33
High jump	Gabriele Günz; SC DHfK Leipzig	1.91 m	Susanne Beyer; SC Dynamo Berlin	1.91 m	Kerstin Brandt; SC Empor Rostock	1.91 m
Long jump	Heike Drechsler; SC Motor Jena	7.20 m	Heike Grabe; SC Magdeburg	6.50 m	Gaby Ehlert; SC DHfK Leipzig	6.49 m
Shot put	Kathrin Neimke; SC Magdeburg	21.06 m	Ines Müller; SC Empor Rostock	20.96 m	Heike Hartwig; SC Dynamo Berlin	20.62 m
Discus throw	Diana Gansky; ASK Vorwärts Potsdam	72.54 m	Gabriele Reinsch; SC Cottbus	71.88 m	Silvia Madetzky; SC Chemie Halle	67.00 m
Javelin throw	Petra Felke; SC Motor Jena	73.86 m	Silke Renk; SC Chemie Halle	71.00 m	Beate Koch; SC Motor Jena	68.32 m
Heptathlon	Heike Tischler; SC Motor Jena	6404 pts	Ines Schulz; SC Karl-Marx-Stadt	6396 pts	Birgit Gautzsch; SC Karl-Marx-Stadt	6146 pts
