= Mattias Elfström =

Swedish ice hockey player (born 1997)

- Born: 8 January 1997 (age 29) Stockholm, Sweden
- Height: 192 cm (6 ft 4 in)
- Weight: 88 kg (194 lb; 13 st 12 lb)
- Position: Forward
- Shoots: Left
- Div.1 team Former teams: IF Troja/Ljungby; Malmö Redhawks
- NHL draft: 197th overall, 2016; Detroit Red Wings
- Playing career: 2016–present

Mattias Elfström (born 8 January 1997) is a Swedish professional ice hockey forward currently playing for Hanhals IF of the Hockeyettan (Div.1). He was drafted by the Detroit Red Wings in the seventh round, 197th overall, in the 2016 NHL entry draft.

Elfström played nine games in the Swedish Hockey League for the Malmö Redhawks. Approaching the 2018–19 season, Elfström left Västerviks IK of the HockeyAllsvenskan, moving down a tier to the Hockeyettan with Hanhals IF on September 21, 2018.

== Career statistics ==
			Regular season					Playoffs
Season	Team	League	GP	G	A	Pts	PIM	GP	G	A	Pts	PIM
2013–14	Malmö Redhawks	J20	—	—	—	—	—	1	0	0	0	0
2014–15	Malmö Redhawks	J20	32	3	2	5	4	1	0	0	0	0
2015–16	Malmö Redhawks	J20	43	11	20	31	16	3	1	3	4	0
2015–16	Malmö Redhawks	SHL	5	0	0	0	2	—	—	—	—	—
2015–16	Tyringe SoSS	Div.1	2	1	1	2	0	—	—	—	—	—
2016–17	Malmö Redhawks	J20	36	18	25	43	16	2	0	1	1	0
2016–17	Malmö Redhawks	SHL	4	0	0	0	0	—	—	—	—	—
2016–17	IK Pantern	Allsv	22	1	3	4	6	—	—	—	—	—
2017–18	Västerviks IK	Allsv	49	5	4	9	10	8	1	2	3	2
2017–18	Nybro Vikings IF	Div.1	1	0	0	0	2	—	—	—	—	—
2018–19	Hanhals IF	Div.1	35	13	22	35	22	2	0	0	0	0
2019–20	IF Troja-Ljungby	Div.1	35	10	14	24	37	—	—	—	—	—
2020–21	Hanhals IF	Div.1	26	6	11	17	6	—	—	—	—	—
SHL totals			9	0	0	0	2	—	—	—	—	—
