= Vladimir Amidzhinov =

Bulgarian long jumper

Vladimir Amidzhinov (Bulgarian: Владимир Амиджинов, born 7 September 1963) is a retired Bulgarian long jumper.

He finished seventh at the 1987 World Championships, and won the 1988 Balkan Championships. He became Bulgarian champion in 1987 and 1988, and became indoor champion in 1985 and 1988.

His personal best jump was 8.11 metres, achieved at the 1987 World Championships.
