= 2016 NHL entry draft =

2016 North American ice hockey draft

General information
- Date: June 24–25, 2016
- Location: KeyBank Center; Buffalo, New York, U.S.
- Networks: Sportsnet (Canada); NBCSN (United States)

Overview
- 211 total selections in 7 rounds
- First selection: (United States) Auston Matthews (Toronto Maple Leafs)

The 2016 NHL entry draft was the 54th draft for the National Hockey League. It was held on June 24–25, 2016, at the KeyBank Center in Buffalo, New York. The first three selections were Auston Matthews by the Toronto Maple Leafs, Patrik Laine by the Winnipeg Jets, and Pierre-Luc Dubois by the Columbus Blue Jackets.

As of 2026, there are 51 active NHL players from this draft.

== Eligibility ==
Ice hockey players born between January 1, 1996, and September 15, 1998, were eligible for selection in the 2016 NHL entry draft. Additionally, un-drafted, non-North American players born in 1995 were eligible for the draft; and those players who were drafted in the 2014 NHL entry draft, but not signed by an NHL team and who were born after June 30, 1996, were also eligible to re-enter the draft.

== Draft lottery ==
Since the 2012–13 NHL season all fourteen teams not qualifying for the Stanley Cup playoffs have a "weighted" chance at winning the first overall selection. Beginning with the 2014–15 NHL season the NHL changed the weighting system that was used in previous years. Under the new system the odds of winning the draft lottery for the four lowest finishing teams in the league decreased, while the odds for the other non-playoff teams increased. Starting with this draft the first three picks overall will be awarded by lottery. The odds of winning the second and third draws increased on a proportional basis depending on which team won the previous draw. The Toronto Maple Leafs, Winnipeg Jets and Columbus Blue Jackets won the draft lotteries that took place on April 30, 2016, giving them the first, second and third picks overall. Toronto retained the top pick, while Winnipeg and Columbus moved up from the sixth and fourth spots, respectively. In the process, the Edmonton Oilers and Vancouver Canucks were each knocked down two places from second and third to fourth and fifth overall, respectively, while the Calgary Flames dropped from fifth to sixth overall.

Indicates team won first overall
Indicates team won second overall
Indicates team won third overall
Indicates teams that did not win a lottery

Complete draft position odds
Team	1st	2nd	3rd	4th	5th	6th	7th	8th	9th	10th	11th	12th	13th	14th
Toronto	20.0%	17.5%	15.0%	47.5%										
Edmonton	13.5%	13.1%	12.5%	35.2%	25.8%									
Vancouver	11.5%	11.4%	11.3%	14.2%	37.8%	13.8%								
Columbus	9.5%	9.7%	9.8%	3.1%	27.3%	33.2%	7.4%							
Calgary	8.5%	8.8%	9.0%		9.1%	35.5%	25.5%	3.7%						
Winnipeg	7.5%	7.8%	8.2%			17.5%	39.3%	17.9%	1.7%					
Arizona	6.5%	6.9%	7.2%				27.9%	39.1%	11.7%	0.8%				
Buffalo	6.0%	6.4%	6.8%					39.2%	34.8%	6.6%	0.3%			
Montreal	5.0%	5.4%	5.6%						51.8%	28.6%	3.4%	0.1%		
Colorado	3.5%	3.8%	4.2%							64.0%	22.8%	1.6%	0.02%	
New Jersey	3.0%	3.3%	3.6%								73.6%	15.9%	0.6%	0.003%
Ottawa	2.5%	2.7%	3.0%									82.3%	9.3%	0.1%
Carolina	2.0%	2.2%	2.5%										90.1%	3.2%
Boston	1.0%	1.1%	1.3%											96.6%

== Top prospects ==
Source: NHL Central Scouting final (April 12, 2016) ranking.

Ranking	North American skaters	European skaters
1	(Canada) Pierre-Luc Dubois (LW/C)	(United States) Auston Matthews (C)
2	(United States) Matthew Tkachuk (LW)	(Finland) Patrik Laine (RW)
3	(Sweden) Alexander Nylander (LW)	(Finland) Jesse Puljujarvi (RW)
4	(Canada) Jakob Chychrun (D)	(Sweden) Rasmus Asplund (C)
5	(Finland) Olli Juolevi (D)	(Russia) German Rubtsov (C)
6	(United States) Charles McAvoy (D)	(Sweden) Carl Grundstrom (RW)
7	(United States) Logan Brown (C)	(Russia) Yegor Korshkov (RW)
8	(Russia) Mikhail Sergachev (D)	(Czech Republic) Filip Hronek (D)
9	(United States) Clayton Keller (C)	(Finland) Henrik Borgstrom (C)
10	(United States) Kieffer Bellows (LW)	(Sweden) Linus Lindstrom (C)

Ranking	North American goalies	European goalies
1	(Canada) Evan Fitzpatrick	(Sweden) Filip Gustavsson
2	(Canada) Carter Hart	(Sweden) Daniel Marmenlind
3	(United States) Tyler Parsons	(Finland) Veini Vehvilainen

== Selections by round ==
The order of the 2016 entry draft is listed below.

= NHL All-Star team ·	= NHL All-Star (Note: Players are identified as an All-Star if they were selected for the All-Star game at any time in their career.) ·	= NHL All-Star and NHL All-Star team ·

=== Round one ===
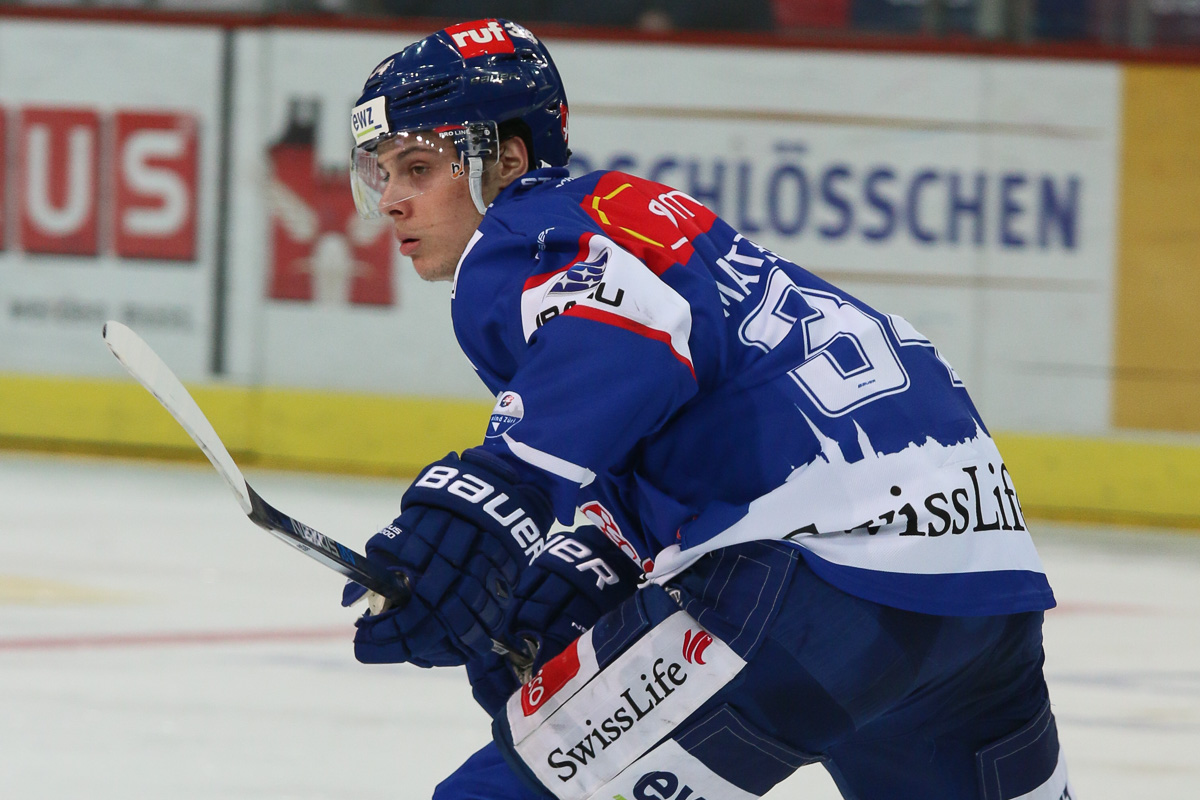
Auston Matthews was selected first overall by the Toronto Maple Leafs.

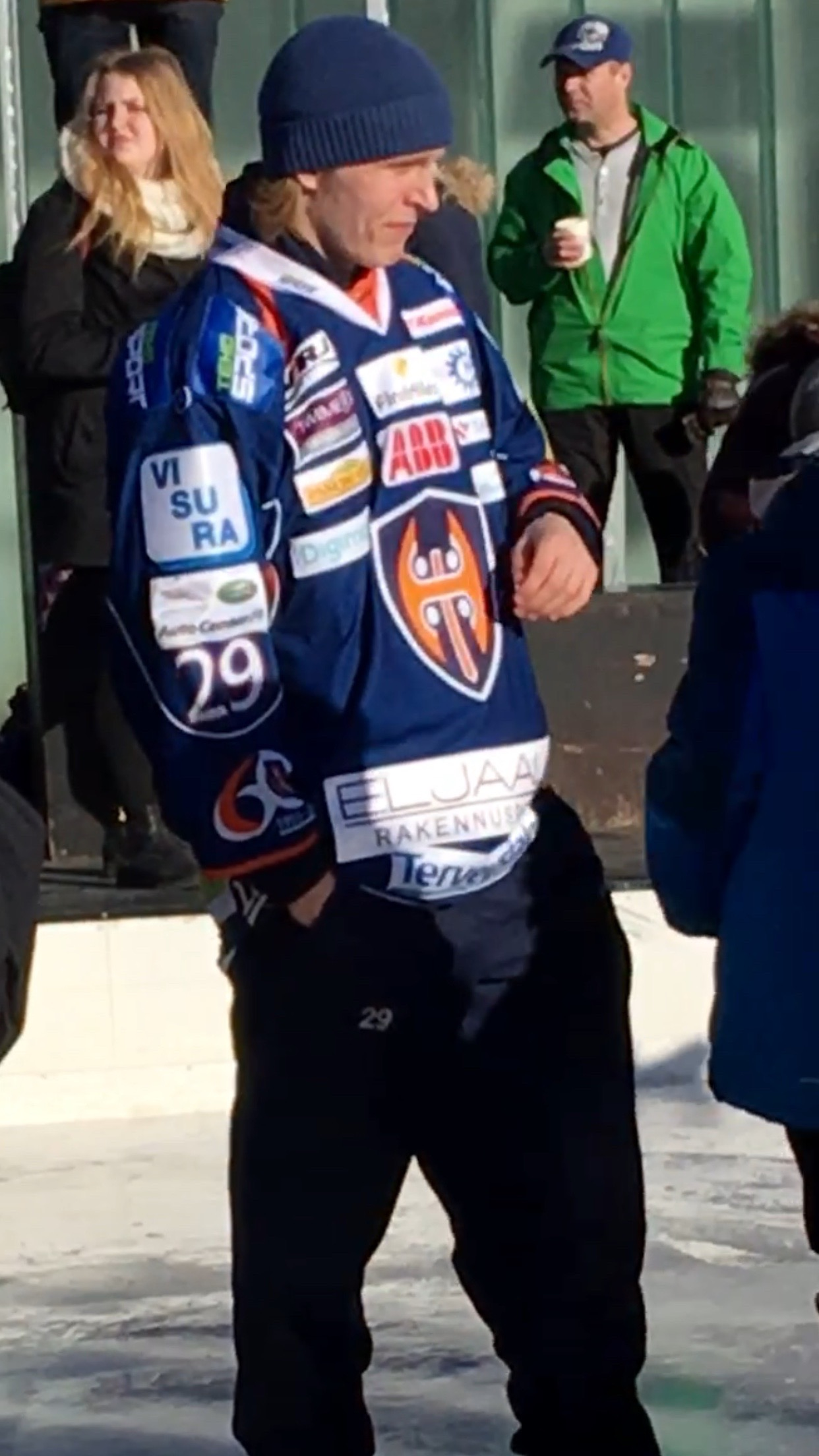
Patrik Laine was selected 2nd overall by the Winnipeg Jets.

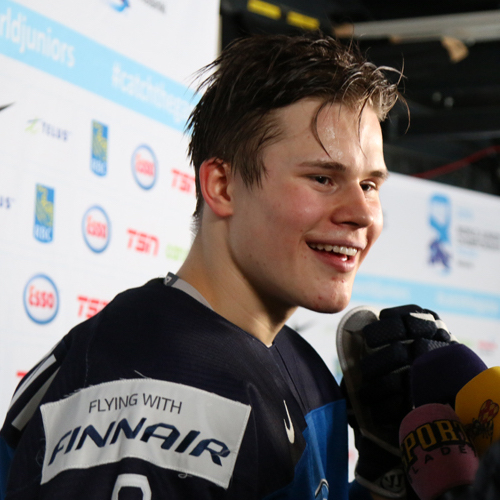
Jesse Puljujarvi was selected fourth overall by the Edmonton Oilers.

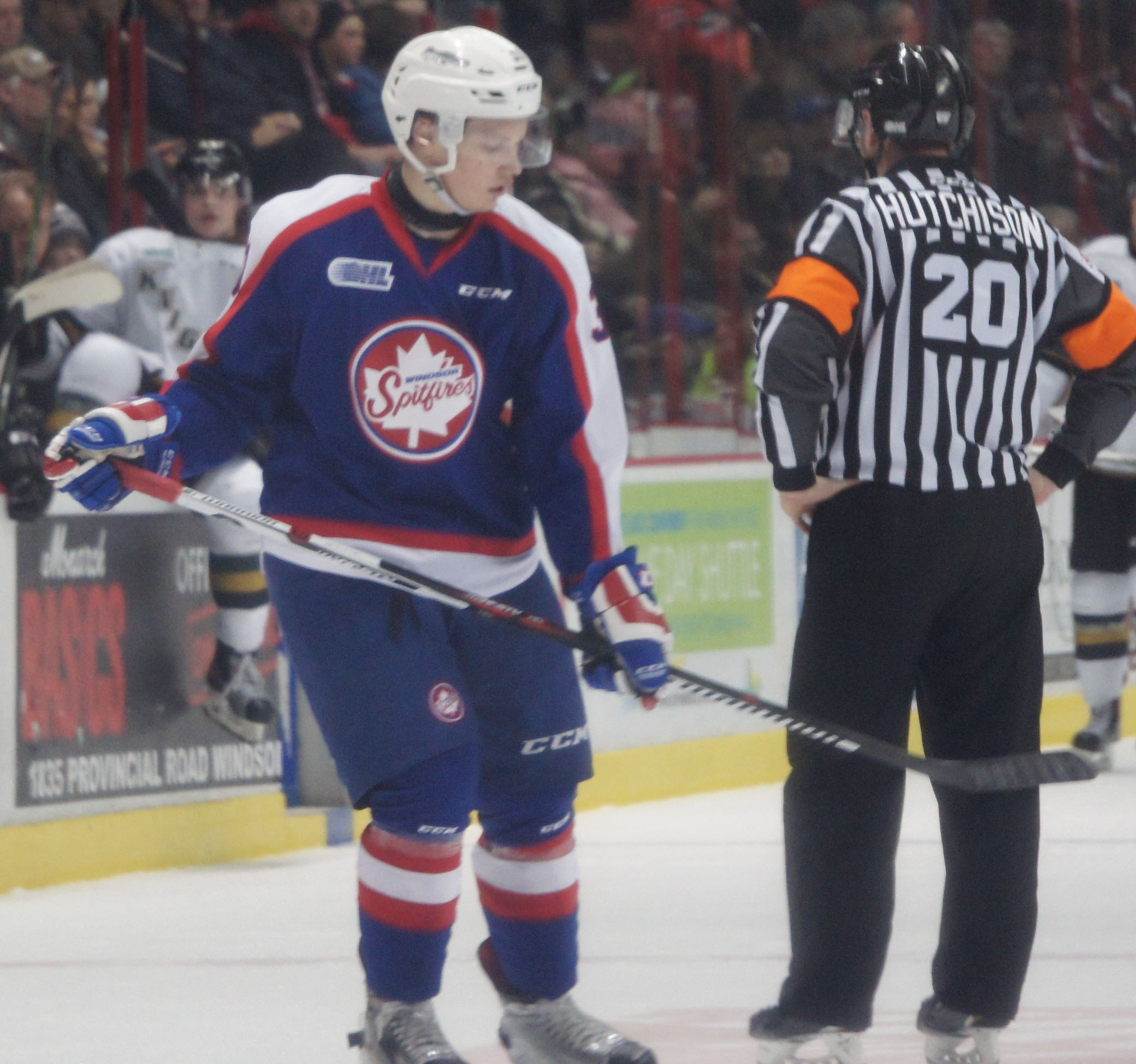
Mikhail Sergachev was selected ninth overall by the Montreal Canadiens.

#	Player	Nationality	NHL team	College/junior/club team
1	Auston Matthews (C)	United States	Toronto Maple Leafs	ZSC Lions (NLA)
2	Patrik Laine (RW)	Finland	Winnipeg Jets	Tappara (Liiga)
3	Pierre-Luc Dubois (LW/C)	Canada	Columbus Blue Jackets	Cape Breton Screaming Eagles (QMJHL)
4	Jesse Puljujarvi (RW)	Finland	Edmonton Oilers	Karpat (Liiga)
5	Olli Juolevi (D)	Finland	Vancouver Canucks	London Knights (OHL)
6	Matthew Tkachuk (LW)	United States	Calgary Flames	London Knights (OHL)
7	Clayton Keller (C)	United States	Arizona Coyotes	U.S. NTDP (USHL)
8	Alexander Nylander (LW)	Sweden	Buffalo Sabres	Mississauga Steelheads (OHL)
9	Mikhail Sergachev (D)	Russia	Montreal Canadiens	Windsor Spitfires (OHL)
10	Tyson Jost (C)	Canada	Colorado Avalanche	Penticton Vees (BCHL)
11	Logan Brown (C)	United States	Ottawa Senators (from New Jersey)^{1}	Windsor Spitfires (OHL)
12	Michael McLeod (C)	Canada	New Jersey Devils (from Ottawa)^{2}	Mississauga Steelheads (OHL)
13	Jake Bean (D)	Canada	Carolina Hurricanes	Calgary Hitmen (WHL)
14	Charlie McAvoy (D)	United States	Boston Bruins	Boston University Terriers (Hockey East)
15	Luke Kunin (C)	United States	Minnesota Wild	Wisconsin Badgers (Big Ten)
16	Jakob Chychrun (D)	Canada	Arizona Coyotes (from Detroit)^{3}	Sarnia Sting (OHL)
17	Dante Fabbro (D)	Canada	Nashville Predators	Penticton Vees (BCHL)
18	Logan Stanley (D)	Canada	Winnipeg Jets (from Philadelphia)^{4}	Windsor Spitfires (OHL)
19	Kieffer Bellows (LW)	United States	New York Islanders	U.S. NTDP (USHL)
20	Dennis Cholowski (D)	Canada	Detroit Red Wings (from NY Rangers via Arizona)^{5}	Chilliwack Chiefs (BCHL)
21	Julien Gauthier (RW)	Canada	Carolina Hurricanes (from Los Angeles)^{6}	Val-d'Or Foreurs (QMJHL)
22	German Rubtsov (C)	Russia	Philadelphia Flyers (from Chicago via Winnipeg)^{7}	Russia U18 (MHL)
23	Henrik Borgstrom (C)	Finland	Florida Panthers	HIFK JR. (FIN-Jr.)
24	Max Jones (LW)	United States	Anaheim Ducks	London Knights (OHL)
25	Riley Tufte (LW)	United States	Dallas Stars	Fargo Force (USHL)
26	Tage Thompson (C)	United States	St. Louis Blues (from Washington)^{8}	Connecticut Huskies (Hockey East)
27	Brett Howden (C)	Canada	Tampa Bay Lightning	Moose Jaw Warriors (WHL)
28	Lucas Johansen (D)	Canada	Washington Capitals (from St. Louis)^{9}	Kelowna Rockets (WHL)
29	Trent Frederic (C)	United States	Boston Bruins (from San Jose)^{10}	U.S. NTDP (USHL)
30	Sam Steel (C)	Canada	Anaheim Ducks (from Pittsburgh via Toronto)^{11}	Regina Pats (WHL)

Notes

1. The New Jersey Devils' first-round pick went to the Ottawa Senators as the result of a trade on June 24, 2016, that sent a first-round pick and the Islanders' third-round pick both in 2016 (12th and 80th overall) to New Jersey in exchange for this pick.
2. The Ottawa Senators' first-round pick went to the New Jersey Devils as the result of a trade on June 24, 2016, that sent a first-round pick (11th overall) to Ottawa in exchange for the Islanders' third-round pick in 2016 (80th overall) and this pick.
3. The Detroit Red Wings' first-round pick went to the Arizona Coyotes as the result of a trade on June 24, 2016, that sent Joe Vitale, the Rangers' first-round pick and a compensatory second-round pick both in 2016 (20th and 53rd overall) to Detroit in exchange for the cap hit of Pavel Datsyuk and this pick.
4. The Philadelphia Flyers' first-round pick went to the Winnipeg Jets as the result of a trade on June 24, 2016, that sent Chicago's first-round pick and a second-round pick both in 2016 (22nd and 36th overall) to Philadelphia in exchange for a third-round pick in 2016 (79th overall) and this pick.
5. The New York Rangers' first-round pick went to the Detroit Red Wings as the result of a trade on June 24, 2016, that sent Pavel Datsyuk and a first-round pick in 2016 (16th overall) to Arizona in exchange for Joe Vitale, a compensatory second-round pick in 2016 (53rd overall) and this pick.
  Arizona previously acquired this pick as the result of a trade on March 1, 2015, that sent Keith Yandle, Chris Summers and a fourth-round pick in 2016 to New York in exchange for John Moore, Anthony Duclair, Tampa Bay's second-round pick in 2015 and this pick (being conditional at the time of the trade). The condition – Arizona will receive a first-round pick in 2016 if New York qualifies for the 2016 Stanley Cup playoffs – was converted on April 4, 2016.
6. The Los Angeles Kings' first-round pick went to the Carolina Hurricanes as the result of a trade on February 25, 2015, that sent Andrej Sekera to Los Angeles in exchange for Roland McKeown and this pick (being conditional at the time of the trade). The condition – Carolina will receive a first-round pick in 2016 if Los Angeles fails to qualify for the 2015 Stanley Cup playoffs – was converted on April 9, 2015.
7. The Chicago Blackhawks' first-round pick went to the Philadelphia Flyers as the result of a trade on June 24, 2016, that sent a first and third-round pick both in 2016 (18th and 79th overall) to Winnipeg in exchange for a second-round pick in 2016 (36th overall) and this pick.
  Winnipeg previously acquired this pick from Chicago as the result of a trade on February 25, 2016, that sent Andrew Ladd, Jay Harrison and Matt Fraser to Chicago in exchange for Marko Dano, a conditional third-round pick in 2018 and this pick.
8. The Washington Capitals' first-round pick went to the St. Louis Blues as the result of a trade on June 24, 2016, that sent a first-round pick and Washington's third-round pick both in 2016 (28th and 87th overall) to Washington in exchange for this pick.
9. The St. Louis Blues' first-round pick went to the Washington Capitals as the result of a trade on June 24, 2016, that sent a first-round pick in 2016 (26th overall) to St. Louis in exchange for Washington's third-round pick in 2016 (87th overall) and this pick.
10. The San Jose Sharks' first-round pick went to the Boston Bruins as the result of a trade on June 30, 2015, that sent Martin Jones to San Jose in exchange for Sean Kuraly and this pick.
11. The Pittsburgh Penguins' first-round pick went to the Anaheim Ducks as the result of a trade on June 20, 2016, that sent Frederik Andersen to Toronto in exchange for a second-round pick in 2017 and this pick.
  Toronto previously acquired this pick from Pittsburgh as the result of a trade on July 1, 2015, that sent Phil Kessel, Tyler Biggs, Tim Erixon and a conditional second-round pick in 2016 to Pittsburgh in exchange for Nick Spaling, Kasperi Kapanen, Scott Harrington, New Jersey's third-round pick in 2016 and this pick (being conditional at the time of the trade). The condition – Toronto will receive a first-round pick in 2016 if Pittsburgh qualifies for the 2016 Stanley Cup playoffs – was converted on April 2, 2016.

=== Round two ===
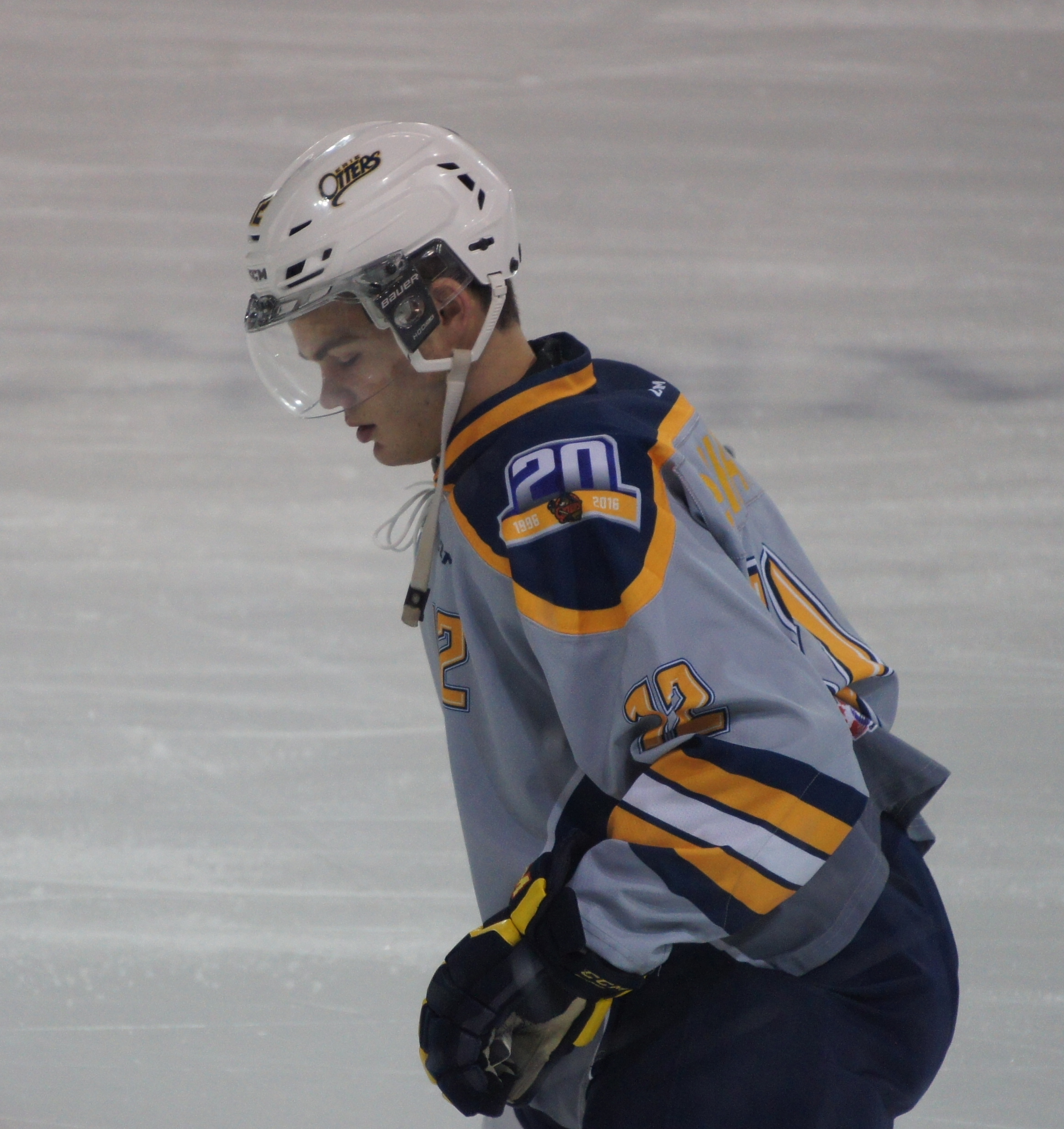
Alex DeBrincat was selected 39th overall by the Chicago Blackhawks.

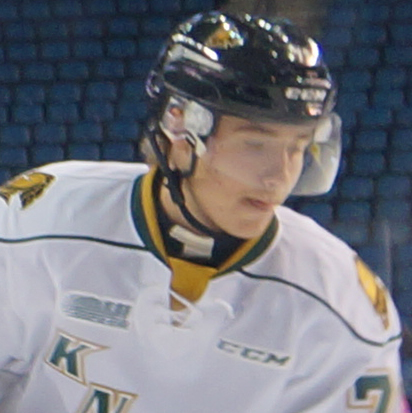
Janne Kuokkanen was selected 43rd overall by the Carolina Hurricanes.

#	Player	Nationality	NHL team	College/junior/club team
31	Yegor Korshkov (RW)	Russia	Toronto Maple Leafs	Lokomotiv Yaroslavl (KHL)
32	Tyler Benson (LW)	Canada	Edmonton Oilers	Vancouver Giants (WHL)
33	Rasmus Asplund (C)	Sweden	Buffalo Sabres (from Vancouver via Florida)^{1}	Farjestad BK (SHL)
34	Andrew Peeke (D)	United States	Columbus Blue Jackets	Green Bay Gamblers (USHL)
35	Jordan Kyrou (C)	Canada	St. Louis Blues (from Calgary)^{2}	Sarnia Sting (OHL)
36	Pascal Laberge (C)	Canada	Philadelphia Flyers (from Winnipeg)^{3}	Victoriaville Tigres (QMJHL)
37	Libor Hajek (D)	Czech Republic	Tampa Bay Lightning (from Arizona)^{4}	Saskatoon Blades (WHL)
38	Adam Mascherin (LW)	Canada	Florida Panthers (from Buffalo)^{5}	Kitchener Rangers (OHL)
39	Alex DeBrincat (RW)	United States	Chicago Blackhawks (from Montreal)^{6}	Erie Otters (OHL)
40	Cameron Morrison (LW)	Canada	Colorado Avalanche (from Colorado via San Jose)^{7}	Youngstown Phantoms (USHL)
41	Nathan Bastian (RW)	Canada	New Jersey Devils	Mississauga Steelheads (OHL)
42	Jonathan Dahlen (C)	Sweden	Ottawa Senators	Timra IK (Swe-2)
43	Janne Kuokkanen (C/LW)	Finland	Carolina Hurricanes	Karpat (Liiga)
44	Boris Katchouk (LW)	Canada	Tampa Bay Lightning (from Boston)^{8}	Sault Ste. Marie Greyhounds (OHL)
45	Chad Krys (D)	United States	Chicago Blackhawks (from Minnesota via Buffalo and Montreal)^{9}	U.S. NTDP (USHL)
46	Givani Smith (RW)	Canada	Detroit Red Wings	Guelph Storm (OHL)
47	Samuel Girard (D)	Canada	Nashville Predators	Shawinigan Cataractes (QMJHL)
48	Carter Hart (G)	Canada	Philadelphia Flyers	Everett Silvertips (WHL)
49	Ryan Lindgren (D)	United States	Boston Bruins (from NY Islanders)^{10}	U.S. NTDP (USHL)
50	Artur Kayumov (LW/RW)	Russia	Chicago Blackhawks (from NY Rangers via Carolina)^{11}	Russia U18 (MHL)
51	Kale Clague (D)	Canada	Los Angeles Kings	Brandon Wheat Kings (WHL)
52	Wade Allison (RW)	Canada	Philadelphia Flyers (from Chicago)^{12}	Tri-City Storm (USHL)
53	Filip Hronek (D)	Czech Republic	Detroit Red Wings (from Arizona; compensatory)^{13}	Mountfield HK (CZE)
54	Tyler Parsons (G)	United States	Calgary Flames (from Florida)^{14}	London Knights (OHL)
55	Filip Gustavsson (G)	Sweden	Pittsburgh Penguins (from Anaheim via Vancouver)^{15}	Lulea HF (SHL)
56	Dillon Dube (C)	Canada	Calgary Flames (from Dallas)^{16}	Kelowna Rockets (WHL)
57	Carl Grundstrom (RW)	Sweden	Toronto Maple Leafs (from Washington)^{17}	Modo Hockey (SHL)
58	Taylor Raddysh (RW)	Canada	Tampa Bay Lightning	Erie Otters (OHL)
59	Evan Fitzpatrick (G)	Canada	St. Louis Blues	Sherbrooke Phoenix (QMJHL)
60	Dylan Gambrell (C)	United States	San Jose Sharks	Denver Pioneers (NCAA)
61	Kasper Bjorkqvist (RW)	Finland	Pittsburgh Penguins (from Pittsburgh via Toronto)^{18}	Espoo Blues (Liiga)

Notes

1. The Vancouver Canucks' second-round pick went to the Buffalo Sabres as the result of a trade on June 25, 2016, that sent Mark Pysyk, a second-round pick and St. Louis' third-round pick both in 2016 (38th and 89th overall) to Florida in exchange for Dmitry Kulikov and this pick.
  Florida previously acquired this pick as the result of a trade on May 25, 2016, that sent Erik Gudbranson and the Islanders fifth-round pick in 2016 to Vancouver in exchange for Jared McCann, a fourth-round pick in 2016 and this pick.
2. The Calgary Flames' second-round pick went to the St. Louis Blues as the result of a trade on June 24, 2016, that sent Brian Elliott to Calgary in exchange for a conditional third-round pick in 2018 and this pick.
3. The Winnipeg Jets' second-round pick went to the Philadelphia Flyers as the result of a trade on June 24, 2016, that sent a first and third-round pick both in 2016 (18th and 79th overall) to Winnipeg in exchange for Chicago's first-round pick in 2016 (22nd overall) and this pick.
4. The Arizona Coyotes' second-round pick went to the Tampa Bay Lightning as the result of a trade on June 25, 2016, that sent Tony DeAngelo to Arizona in exchange for this pick.
5. The Buffalo Sabres' second-round pick went to the Florida Panthers as the result of a trade on June 25, 2016, that sent Dmitri Kulikov and Vancouver's second-round pick in 2016 (33rd overall) to Buffalo in exchange for Mark Pysyk, St. Louis' third-round pick in 2016 (89th overall) and this pick.
6. The Montreal Canadiens' second-round pick went to the Chicago Blackhawks as the result of a trade on June 24, 2016, that sent Andrew Shaw to Montreal in exchange for Minnesota's second-round pick in 2016 (45th overall) and this pick.
7. The Colorado Avalanche's second-round pick was re-acquired as the result of a trade on June 27, 2015, that sent Buffalo's second-round pick in 2015 to San Jose in exchange for a second-round pick in 2015, Colorado's sixth-round pick in 2017 and this pick.
  San Jose previously acquired this pick as the result of a trade on July 1, 2014, that sent Brad Stuart to Colorado in exchange for a sixth-round pick in 2017 and this pick.
8. The Boston Bruins' second-round pick went to the Tampa Bay Lightning as the result of a trade on March 2, 2015, that sent Brett Connolly to Boston in exchange for a second-round pick in 2015 and this pick.
9. The Minnesota Wild's second-round pick went to the Chicago Blackhawks as the result of a trade on June 24, 2016, that sent Andrew Shaw to Montreal in exchange for a second-round pick in 2016 (39th overall) and this pick.
  Montreal previously acquired this pick as the result of a trade on July 1, 2014, that sent Josh Gorges to Buffalo in exchange for this pick.
  Buffalo previously acquired this pick as the result of a trade on March 5, 2014, that sent Matt Moulson and Cody McCormick to Minnesota in exchange for Torrey Mitchell, Winnipeg's second-round pick in 2014 and this pick.
10. The New York Islanders' second-round pick went to the Boston Bruins as the result of a trade on October 4, 2014, that sent Johnny Boychuk to New York in exchange for Philadelphia's second-round pick in 2015, a conditional third-round pick in 2015 and this pick.
11. The New York Rangers' second-round pick went the Chicago Blackhawks as the result of a trade on June 15, 2016, that sent Teuvo Teravainen and Bryan Bickell to Carolina in exchange for Chicago's third-round pick in 2017 and this pick.
  Carolina previously acquired this pick as the result of a trade on February 28, 2016, that sent Eric Staal to New York in exchange for Aleksi Saarela, a second-round pick in 2017 and this pick.
12. The Chicago Blackhawks' second-round pick went to the Philadelphia Flyers as the result of a trade on February 27, 2015, that sent Kimmo Timonen to Chicago in exchange for a second-round pick in 2015 and this pick (being conditional at the time of the trade). The condition – Philadelphia will receive a second-round pick in 2016 if Chicago advances to the 2015 Stanley Cup Finals with Timonen playing in at least 50% of the Blackhawks' playoff games – was converted on May 30, 2015.
13. The Arizona Coyotes' compensatory second-round pick (53rd overall) went to the Detroit Red Wings as the result of a trade on June 24, 2016, that sent Pavel Datsyuk and a first-round pick in 2016 (16th overall) to Arizona in exchange for Joe Vitale, the Rangers' first-round pick in 2016 (20th overall) and this pick.
  Arizona previously received this pick as compensation for not signing 2014 first-round draft pick Conner Bleackley, whom they acquired in an earlier trade with Colorado.
14. The Florida Panthers' second-round pick went to the Calgary Flames as the result of a trade on February 27, 2016, that sent Jiri Hudler to Florida in exchange for a fourth-round pick in 2018 and this pick.
15. The Anaheim Ducks' second-round pick went to the Pittsburgh Penguins as the result of a trade on July 28, 2015, that sent Brandon Sutter and a conditional third-round pick in 2016 to Vancouver in exchange for Nick Bonino, Adam Clendening and this pick.
  Vancouver previously acquired this pick as the result of a trade on June 30, 2015, that sent Kevin Bieksa to Anaheim in exchange for this pick.
16. The Dallas Stars' second-round pick went the Calgary Flames as the result of a trade on February 29, 2016, that sent Kris Russell to Dallas in exchange for Jyrki Jokipakka, Brett Pollock and this pick (being conditional at time of the trade). The condition – Calgary will receive a second-round pick in 2016 if Dallas fails to qualify for the 2016 Western Conference Final – was converted on May 11, 2016.
17. The Washington Capitals' second-round pick went to the Toronto Maple Leafs as the result of a trade on February 28, 2016, that sent Daniel Winnik and Anaheim's fifth-round pick in 2016 to Washington in exchange for Brooks Laich, Connor Carrick and this pick.
18. The Pittsburgh Penguins' second-round pick was re-acquired as the result of a trade on trade on July 1, 2015, that sent Nick Spaling, Kasperi Kapanen, Scott Harrington, New Jersey's third-round pick in 2016 and a conditional first-round pick in 2016 to Toronto in exchange for Phil Kessel, Tyler Biggs, Tim Erixon and this pick (being conditional at the time of the trade). The condition – Pittsburgh will re-acquire their own second-round pick in 2016 if the Penguins qualify for the 2016 Stanley Cup playoffs – was converted on April 2, 2016, when the Penguins clinched a playoff spot.
  Toronto previously acquired this pick as the result of a trade on February 25, 2015, in a trade that sent Daniel Winnik to Pittsburgh in exchange for Zach Sill, a fourth-round pick in 2015 and this pick.

=== Round three ===
#	Player	Nationality	NHL team	College/junior/club team
62	Joseph Woll (G)	United States	Toronto Maple Leafs	U.S. NTDP (USHL)
63	Markus Niemelainen (D)	Finland	Edmonton Oilers	Saginaw Spirit (OHL)
64	William Lockwood (RW)	United States	Vancouver Canucks (from Vancouver via NY Islanders, Buffalo and Pittsburgh)^{1}	U.S. NTDP (USHL)
65	Vitalii Abramov (RW)	Russia	Columbus Blue Jackets	Gatineau Olympiques (QMJHL)
66	Adam Fox (D)	United States	Calgary Flames	U.S. NTDP (USHL)
67	Matt Filipe (LW)	United States	Carolina Hurricanes (from Winnipeg)^{2}	Cedar Rapids RoughRiders (USHL)
68	Cam Dineen (D)	United States	Arizona Coyotes	North Bay Battalion (OHL)
69	Cliff Pu (RW)	Canada	Buffalo Sabres	London Knights (OHL)
70	William Bitten (C)	Canada	Montreal Canadiens	Flint Firebirds (OHL)
71	Josh Anderson (D)	Canada	Colorado Avalanche	Prince George Cougars (WHL)
72	James Greenway (D)	United States	Toronto Maple Leafs (from New Jersey via Pittsburgh)^{3}	U.S. NTDP (USHL)
73	Joey Anderson (RW)	United States	New Jersey Devils (from Ottawa)^{4}	U.S. NTDP (USHL)
74	Hudson Elynuik (C)	Canada	Carolina Hurricanes	Spokane Chiefs (WHL)
75	Jack Lafontaine (G)	Canada	Carolina Hurricanes (from Boston)^{5}	Janesville Jets (NAHL)
76	Rem Pitlick (C)	United States	Nashville Predators (from Minnesota via Florida, New Jersey, Anaheim and Buffalo)^{6}	Muskegon Lumberjacks (USHL)
77	Connor Hall (D)	Canada	Pittsburgh Penguins (from Detroit via New Jersey)^{7}	Kitchener Rangers (OHL)
78	Frederic Allard (D)	Canada	Nashville Predators	Chicoutimi Sagueneens (QMJHL)
79	Luke Green (D)	Canada	Winnipeg Jets (from Philadelphia)^{8}	Saint John Sea Dogs (QMJHL)
80	Brandon Gignac (C)	Canada	New Jersey Devils (from NY Islanders via Ottawa)^{9}	Shawinigan Cataractes (QMJHL)
81	Sean Day (D)	Canada	New York Rangers	Mississauga Steelheads (OHL)
82	Carsen Twarynski (LW)	Canada	Philadelphia Flyers (from Los Angeles)^{10}	Calgary Hitmen (WHL)
83	Wouter Peeters (G)	Belgium	Chicago Blackhawks	EC Red Bull Salzburg (Austria)
84	Matthew Cairns (D)	Canada	Edmonton Oilers (from Florida)^{11}	Georgetown Raiders (OJHL)
85	Joshua Mahura (D)	Canada	Anaheim Ducks	Red Deer Rebels (WHL)
86	Casey Fitzgerald (D)	United States	Buffalo Sabres (from Dallas)^{12}	Boston College Eagles (Hockey East)
87	Garrett Pilon (C)	Canada	Washington Capitals (from Washington via St. Louis)^{13}	Kamloops Blazers (WHL)
88	Connor Ingram (G)	Canada	Tampa Bay Lightning	Kamloops Blazers (WHL)
89	Linus Nassen (D)	Sweden	Florida Panthers (from St. Louis via Buffalo)^{14}	Lulea HF (SHL)
90	Fredrik Karlstrom (C)	Sweden	Dallas Stars (from San Jose)^{15}	AIK (Swe-Jr)
91	Filip Berglund (D)	Sweden	Edmonton Oilers (from Pittsburgh)^{16}	Skelleftea AIK (SHL)

Notes

1. The Vancouver Canucks' third-round pick was re-acquired as the result of a trade on July 28, 2015, that sent Nick Bonino, Adam Clendening and Anaheim's second-round pick in 2016 to Pittsburgh in exchange for Brandon Sutter and this pick (being conditional at the time of the trade). The condition – Vancouver will receive the earlier of New York or Vancouver's third-round pick in 2016 – was converted on March 25, 2016, when the Canucks were eliminated from playoff contention ensuring that they would finish behind the Islanders in the overall league standings.
  Pittsburgh previously acquired this pick as compensation for Buffalo hiring Dan Bylsma as their head coach on May 28, 2015.
  Buffalo previously acquired this pick as the result of a trade on March 2, 2015, that sent Michal Neuvirth to the New York Islanders in exchange for Chad Johnson and this pick.
  The Islanders previously acquired this pick as the result of a trade on November 25, 2014, that sent Andrey Pedan to Vancouver in exchange for Alexandre Mallet and this pick.
2. The Winnipeg Jets' third round pick went to the Carolina Hurricanes as the result of a trade on February 25, 2015, that sent Jiri Tlusty to Winnipeg in exchange for a conditional sixth-round pick in 2015 and this pick.
3. The New Jersey Devils' third-round pick went to the Toronto Maple Leafs as the result of a trade on July 1, 2015, that sent Phil Kessel, Tyler Biggs, Tim Erixon and a conditional second-round pick in 2016 to Pittsburgh in exchange for Nick Spaling, Kasperi Kapanen, Scott Harrington, a conditional first-round pick in 2016 and this pick.
  Pittsburgh previously acquired this pick as compensation for New Jersey hiring John Hynes as their head coach on June 2, 2015.
4. The Ottawa Senators' third-round pick went to the New Jersey Devils as the result of a trade on June 27, 2015, that sent a second-round pick in 2015 to Ottawa in exchange for Dallas' second-round pick in 2015 and this pick (being conditional at the time of the trade). The condition – New Jersey will receive a fourth-round pick in 2015 or a third-round pick in 2016 at their choice – was converted when New Jersey did not take the 109th pick in the 2015 NHL entry draft.
5. The Boston Bruins' third-round pick went to the Carolina Hurricanes as the result of a trade on February 29, 2016, that sent John-Michael Liles to Boston in exchange for Anthony Camara, a fifth-round pick in 2017 and this pick.
6. The Minnesota Wild's third-round pick went to the Nashville Predators as the result of a trade on June 20, 2016, that sent Jimmy Vesey to Buffalo in exchange for this pick.
  Buffalo previously acquired this pick as the result of a trade on February 29, 2016, that sent Jamie McGinn to Anaheim in exchange for this pick (being conditional at the time of the trade). The condition – Buffalo will receive a third-round pick in 2016 if Anaheim does not qualify for the 2016 Western Conference Final – was converted on April 27, 2016, when Anaheim was eliminated from the 2016 Stanley Cup playoffs.
  Anaheim previously acquired this pick as the result of a trade on June 26, 2015, that sent Kyle Palmieri to New Jersey in exchange for Florida's second-round pick in 2015 and this pick (being conditional at the time of the trade). The condition – Anaheim will receive the higher of either Florida or Minnesota's third-round pick in 2016. – was converted on April 24, 2016, when Minnesota was eliminated from the 2016 Stanley Cup playoffs ensuring that the Wild's pick would be higher than Florida's.
  New Jersey previously acquired this pick as the result of a trade on February 26, 2015, that sent Jaromir Jagr to Florida in exchange for a second-round pick in 2015 and this pick.
  Florida previously acquired this pick as the result of a trade on February 24, 2015, that sent Sean Bergenheim and a seventh-round pick in 2016 to Minnesota in exchange for this pick.
7. The Detroit Red Wings' third-round pick went to the Pittsburgh Penguins as the result of a trade on June 25, 2016, that sent Beau Bennett to New Jersey in exchange for this pick.
  New Jersey previously acquired this pick as the result of a trade on March 2, 2015, that sent Marek Zidlicky to Detroit in exchange for a conditional fifth-round pick in 2015 and this pick (being conditional at the time of the trade). The condition – New Jersey will receive a third-round pick in 2016 if Detroit does not advance to the 2015 Stanley Cup Finals – was converted on April 29, 2015, when Detroit was eliminated from the 2015 Stanley Cup playoffs.
8. The Philadelphia Flyers' third-round pick went to the Winnipeg Jets as the result of a trade on June 24, 2016, that sent Chicago's first-round pick and a second-round pick both in 2016 (22nd and 36th overall) to Philadelphia in exchange for a first-round pick in 2016 (18th overall) and this pick.
9. The New York Islanders' third-round pick went to the New Jersey Devils as the result of a trade on June 24, 2016, that sent a first-round pick in 2016 (11th overall) to Ottawa in exchange for a first-round pick in 2016 (12th overall) and this pick.
  Ottawa previously acquired this pick as the result of a trade on February 29, 2016, that sent Shane Prince and a seventh-round pick in 2016 to New York in exchange for this pick (being conditional at the time of the trade). The condition – Ottawa will receive the lower of New York or Vancouver's third-round pick in 2016 – was converted on March 25, 2016, when the Canucks were eliminated from playoff contention ensuring that they would finish behind the Islanders in the overall league standings.
10. The Los Angeles Kings' third-round pick went to the Philadelphia Flyers as the result of a trade on January 6, 2016, that sent Vincent Lecavalier and Luke Schenn to Los Angeles in exchange for Jordan Weal and this pick.
11. The Florida Panthers' third-round pick went to the Edmonton Oilers as the result of a trade on February 27, 2016, that sent Teddy Purcell to Florida in exchange for this pick (being conditional at the time of the trade). The condition – Edmonton will receive the lower of Minnesota or Florida's third-round pick in 2016 – was converted on April 24, 2016, when Minnesota was eliminated from the 2016 Stanley Cup playoffs ensuring that the Florida's pick would be lower than Minnesota's.
12. The Dallas Stars' third-round pick went to the Buffalo Sabres as the result of a trade on February 11, 2015, that sent Jhonas Enroth to Dallas in exchange for Anders Lindback and this pick (being conditional at the time of the trade). The condition – Buffalo will receive a third-round pick in 2016 if Enroth wins fewer than four playoff games for the Stars in 2015 – was converted on April 6, 2015, when the Stars were eliminated from playoff contention.
13. The Washington Capitals' third-round pick was re-acquired as the result of a trade on June 24, 2016, that sent a first-round pick in 2016 (26th overall) to St. Louis in exchange for a first-round pick in 2016 (28th overall) and this pick.
  St. Louis previously acquired this pick as the result of a trade on July 2, 2015, that sent T.J. Oshie to Washington in exchange for Troy Brouwer, Pheonix Copley and this pick.
14. The St. Louis Blues' third-round pick went to the Florida Panthers as the result of a trade on June 25, 2016, that sent Dmitri Kulikov and Vancouver's second-round pick in 2016 (33rd overall) to Buffalo in exchange for Mark Pysyk, a second-round pick in 2016 (38th overall) and this pick.
  Buffalo previously acquired this pick as the result of a trade on February 28, 2014, that sent Ryan Miller, Steve Ott and conditional second and third-round picks in 2014 to St. Louis in exchange for Jaroslav Halak, Chris Stewart, William Carrier, a first-round pick in 2015 and this pick (being conditional at the time of the trade). The condition – Buffalo will receive a third-round pick in 2016 if Miller does not re-sign with St. Louis for the 2014–15 NHL season – was converted on July 1, 2014, when Miller signed with Vancouver.
15. The San Jose Sharks' third-round pick went to the Dallas Stars as the result of a trade on November 21, 2014, that sent Brenden Dillon to San Jose in exchange for Jason Demers and this pick.
16. The Pittsburgh Penguins' third-round pick went to the Edmonton Oilers as the result of a trade on February 27, 2016, that sent Justin Schultz to Pittsburgh in exchange for this pick.

=== Round four ===
#	Player	Nationality	NHL team	College/junior/club team
92	Adam Brooks (C)	Canada	Toronto Maple Leafs	Regina Pats (WHL)
93	Jack Kopacka (LW)	United States	Anaheim Ducks (from Edmonton)^{1}	Sault Ste. Marie Greyhounds (OHL)
94	Jonathan Ang (C)	Canada	Florida Panthers (from Vancouver)^{2}	Peterborough Petes (OHL)
95	Anatoly Golyshev (LW)	Russia	New York Islanders (from Columbus via Chicago)^{3}	Avtomobilist Yekaterinburg (KHL)
96	Linus Lindstrom (C)	Sweden	Calgary Flames	Skelleftea AIK (SHL)
97	Jacob Cederholm (D)	Sweden	Winnipeg Jets	HV71 (SHL)
98	Tarmo Reunanen (D)	Finland	New York Rangers (from Arizona)^{4}	HC TPS Jr.
99	Brett Murray (LW)	Canada	Buffalo Sabres	Carleton Place Canadians (CCHL)
100	Victor Mete (D)	Canada	Montreal Canadiens	London Knights (OHL)
101	Keaton Middleton (D)	Canada	Toronto Maple Leafs (from Colorado)^{5}	Saginaw Spirit (OHL)
102	Mikhail Maltsev (LW)	Russia	New Jersey Devils	Russia U-18 (MHL)
103	Todd Burgess (LW)	United States	Ottawa Senators	Fairbanks Ice Dogs (NAHL)
104	Max Zimmer (LW)	United States	Carolina Hurricanes	Chicago Steel (USHL)
105	Evan Cormier (G)	Canada	New Jersey Devils (from Boston)^{6}	Saginaw Spirit (OHL)
106	Brandon Duhaime (RW)	United States	Minnesota Wild	Tri-City Storm (USHL)
107	Alfons Malmstrom (D)	Sweden	Detroit Red Wings	Orebro Jr. (Sweden)
108	Hardy Haman-Aktell (D)	Sweden	Nashville Predators	Skelleftea Jr. (Sweden)
109	Connor Bunnaman (C)	Canada	Philadelphia Flyers	Kitchener Rangers (OHL)
110	Lucas Carlsson (D)	Sweden	Chicago Blackhawks (from NY Islanders)	Brynas IF (SHL)
111	Noah Gregor (C)	Canada	San Jose Sharks (from NY Rangers)^{7}	Moose Jaw Warriors (WHL)
112	Jacob Moverare (D)	Sweden	Los Angeles Kings	HV71 (SHL)
113	Nathan Noel (C)	Canada	Chicago Blackhawks	Saint John Sea Dogs (QMJHL)
114	Riley Stillman (D)	Canada	Florida Panthers	Oshawa Generals (OHL)
115	Alex Dostie (C)	Canada	Anaheim Ducks	Gatineau Olympiques (QMJHL)
116	Rhett Gardner (C)	Canada	Dallas Stars	North Dakota Fighting Hawks (NCHC)
117	Damien Riat (LW)	Switzerland	Washington Capitals	Geneve-Servette HC (NLA)
118	Ross Colton (C)	United States	Tampa Bay Lightning	Cedar Rapids RoughRiders (USHL)
119	Tanner Kaspick (C)	Canada	St. Louis Blues	Brandon Wheat Kings (WHL)
120	Otto Koivula (LW)	Finland	New York Islanders (from San Jose via Arizona and Philadelphia)^{8}	Ilves (Liiga)
121	Ryan Jones (D)	United States	Pittsburgh Penguins	Lincoln Stars (USHL)

Notes

1. The Edmonton Oilers' fourth-round pick went to the Anaheim Ducks as the result of a trade on February 29, 2016, that sent Patrick Maroon to Edmonton in exchange for Martin Gernat and this pick.
2. The Vancouver Canucks' fourth-round pick went to the Florida Panthers as the result of a trade on May 25, 2016, that sent Erik Gudbranson and the Islanders fifth-round pick in 2016 to Vancouver in exchange for Jared McCann, a second-round pick in 2016 and this pick.
3. The Columbus Blue Jackets' fourth-round pick went to the New York Islanders as the result of a trade on June 25, 2016, that sent a fourth-round pick in 2016 (110th overall) and a sixth-round pick in 2017 to Chicago in exchange for this pick.
  Chicago previously acquired this pick as the result of a trade on June 30, 2015, that sent Brandon Saad, Michael Paliotta and Alex Broadhurst to Columbus in exchange for Artem Anisimov, Jeremy Morin, Corey Tropp, Marko Dano and this pick.
4. The Arizona Coyotes' fourth-round pick went to the New York Rangers as the result of a trade on March 1, 2015, that sent John Moore, Anthony Duclair, Tampa Bay's second-round pick in 2015 and a conditional first-round pick in 2016 to Arizona in exchange for Keith Yandle, Chris Summers and this pick.
5. The Colorado Avalanche's fourth-round pick went to the Toronto Maple Leafs as the result of a trade on February 21, 2016, that sent Shawn Matthias to Colorado in exchange for Colin Smith and this pick.
6. The Boston Bruins' fourth-round pick went to the New Jersey Devils as the result of a trade on February 29, 2016, that sent Lee Stempniak to Boston in exchange for a second-round pick in 2017 and this pick.
7. The New York Islanders' fourth-round pick went to Chicago Blackhawks as the result of a trade on June 25, 2016, that sent Columbus' fourth-round pick in 2016 (95th overall) to New York in exchange for a sixth-round pick in 2017 and this pick.
8. The New York Rangers' fourth-round pick went to the San Jose Sharks as the result of a trade on March 1, 2015, that sent James Sheppard to New York in exchange for this pick.
9. The San Jose Sharks' fourth-round pick went to the New York Islanders as the result of a trade on June 25, 2016, that sent a fourth-round pick in 2017 to Philadelphia in exchange for this pick.
  Philadelphia previously acquired this pick as the result of a trade on June 27, 2015, that sent Nicklas Grossmann and Chris Pronger to Arizona in exchange for Sam Gagner and this pick (being conditional at the time of the trade). The condition – Philadelphia will receive a fourth-round pick in 2016 if Arizona acquires another fourth-round pick in 2016, at Arizona's choice – was converted on June 25, 2016.
  Arizona previously acquired this pick as the result of a trade on June 20, 2016, that sent Maxim Letunov and a sixth-round pick in 2017 to San Jose in exchange for Detroit's third-round pick in 2017 and this pick.

=== Round five ===
#	Player	Nationality	NHL team	College/junior/club team
122	Vladimir Bobylev (RW)	Russia	Toronto Maple Leafs	Victoria Royals (WHL)
123	Dylan Wells (G)	Canada	Edmonton Oilers	Peterborough Petes (OHL)
124	Casey Staum (D)	United States	Montreal Canadiens (from Vancouver)^{1}	Hill-Murray Pioneers (US-MN HS)
125	Nolan Stevens (C)	United States	St. Louis Blues (from Columbus)^{2}	Northeastern Huskies (NCAA)
126	Mitchell Mattson (C)	United States	Calgary Flames	Grand Rapids Thunderhawks (US-MN HS)
127	Jordan Stallard (C)	Canada	Winnipeg Jets	Calgary Hitmen (WHL)
128	Colton Point (G)	Canada	Dallas Stars (from Arizona)^{3}	Carleton Place Canadians (CCHL)
129	Philip Nyberg (D)	Sweden	Buffalo Sabres	Linkoping-jr. (SWE-jr.)
130	Vojtech Budik (D)	Czech Republic	Buffalo Sabres (from Montreal)^{4}	Prince Albert Raiders (WHL)
131	Adam Werner (G)	Sweden	Colorado Avalanche	Farjestad BK (SHL)
132	Yegor Rykov (D)	Russia	New Jersey Devils	SKA-1946 (MHL)
133	Maxime Lajoie (D)	Canada	Ottawa Senators	Swift Current Broncos (WHL)
134	Jeremy Helvig (G)	Canada	Carolina Hurricanes	Kingston Frontenacs (OHL)
135	Joona Koppanen (LW)	Finland	Boston Bruins	Ilves-jr. (FIN-jr.)
136	Cameron Clarke (D)	United States	Boston Bruins (from Minnesota)^{5}	Lone Star Brahmas (NAHL)
137	Jordan Sambrook (D)	Canada	Detroit Red Wings	Erie Otters (OHL)
138	Patrick Harper (C)	United States	Nashville Predators	Avon Old Farms Winged Beavers (US-CT HS)
139	Linus Hogberg (D)	Sweden	Philadelphia Flyers	Vaxjo-jr. (SWE-jr.)
140	Cole Candella (D)	Canada	Vancouver Canucks (from NY Islanders via Florida)^{6}	Hamilton Bulldogs (OHL)
141	Tim Gettinger (LW)	United States	New York Rangers	Sault Ste. Marie Greyhounds (OHL)
142	Michael Eyssimont (C)	United States	Los Angeles Kings	St. Cloud State Huskies (NCAA)
143	Mathias From (LW/RW)	Denmark	Chicago Blackhawks	Rogle-jr. (SWE-jr.)
144	Conner Bleackley (C)	Canada	St. Louis Blues (from Florida via Chicago)^{7}	Red Deer Rebels (WHL)
145	Beck Malenstyn (LW)	Canada	Washington Capitals (from Anaheim via Toronto)^{8}	Calgary Hitmen (WHL)
146	Nicholas Caamano (RW)	Canada	Dallas Stars	Flint Firebirds (OHL)
147	Axel Jonsson Fjallby (LW)	Sweden	Washington Capitals	Djurgarden-jr. (SWE-jr.)
148	Christopher Paquette (C)	Canada	Tampa Bay Lightning	Niagara IceDogs (OHL)
149	Graham McPhee (LW)	United States	Edmonton Oilers (from St. Louis)^{9}	U.S. NTDP (USHL)
150	Manuel Wiederer (C)	Germany	San Jose Sharks	Moncton Wildcats (QMJHL)
151	Niclas Almari (D)	Finland	Pittsburgh Penguins	Jokerit-jr. (FIN-jr.)

Notes

1. The Vancouver Canucks' fifth-round pick went to the Montreal Canadiens as the result of a trade on July 1, 2015, that sent Brandon Prust to Vancouver in exchange for Zack Kassian and this pick.
2. The Columbus Blue Jackets' fifth-round pick went to the St. Louis Blues as the result of a trade on November 15, 2014, that sent Jordan Leopold to Columbus in exchange for this pick.
3. The Arizona Coyotes' fifth-round pick went to the Dallas Stars as the result of a trade on June 16, 2016, that sent Alex Goligoski to Arizona in exchange for this pick.
4. The Montreal Canadiens' fifth-round pick went to the Buffalo Sabres as the result of a trade on March 2, 2015, that sent Brian Flynn to Montreal in exchange for this pick.
5. The Minnesota Wild's fifth-round pick went to the Boston Bruins as the result of a trade on June 27, 2015, that sent a fifth-round pick in 2015 to Minnesota in exchange for this pick.
6. The New York Islanders' fifth-round pick went to the Vancouver Canucks as the result of a trade on May 25, 2016, that sent Jared McCann, a second and fourth-round pick both in 2016 to Florida in exchange for Erik Gudbranson and this pick.
  Florida previously acquired this pick as the result of a trade on June 27, 2015, that sent Montreal's fifth-round pick in 2015 to New York in exchange for this pick.
7. The Florida Panthers' fifth-round pick went to the St. Louis Blues as the result of a trade on June 25, 2016, that sent a fifth-round pick in 2017 to Chicago in exchange for this pick.
  Chicago previously acquired this pick as the result of a trade on March 2, 2014, that sent Brandon Pirri to Florida in exchange for a third-round pick in 2014 and this pick.
8. The Anaheim Ducks' fifth-round pick went to the Washington Capitals as the result of a trade on February 28, 2016, that sent Brooks Laich, Connor Carrick and a second-round pick in 2016 to Toronto in exchange for Daniel Winnik and this pick.
  Toronto previously acquired this pick as the result of a trade on March 2, 2015, that sent Korbinian Holzer to Anaheim in exchange for Eric Brewer and this pick.
9. The St. Louis Blues' fifth-round pick went to the Edmonton Oilers as the result of a trade on February 27, 2016, that sent Anders Nilsson to St. Louis in exchange for Niklas Lundstrom and this pick.

=== Round six ===
#	Player	Nationality	NHL team	College/junior/club team
152	Jack Walker (LW)	United States	Toronto Maple Leafs	Victoria Royals (WHL)
153	Aapeli Rasanen (C)	Finland	Edmonton Oilers	Tappara-jr. (FIN-jr.)
154	Jakob Stukel (LW)	Canada	Vancouver Canucks	Calgary Hitmen (WHL)
155	Peter Thome (G)	United States	Columbus Blue Jackets	Aberdeen Wings (NAHL)
156	Eetu Tuulola (RW)	Finland	Calgary Flames	HPK (Liiga)
157	Mikhail Berdin (G)	Russia	Winnipeg Jets	Russia U18 (MHL)
158	Patrick Kudla (D)	Canada	Arizona Coyotes	Oakville Blades (OJHL)
159	Brandon Hagel (LW)	Canada	Buffalo Sabres	Red Deer Rebels (WHL)
160	Michael Pezzetta (C)	Canada	Montreal Canadiens	Sudbury Wolves (OHL)
161	Nathan Clurman (D)	United States	Colorado Avalanche	Culver Eagles (US-IN HS)
162	Jesper Bratt (LW/RW)	Sweden	New Jersey Devils	AIK (Swe-2)
163	Markus Nurmi (RW/LW)	Finland	Ottawa Senators	TPS (Liiga)
164	Noah Carroll (D)	Canada	Carolina Hurricanes	Guelph Storm (OHL)
165	Oskar Steen (C)	Sweden	Boston Bruins (from Boston via Colorado)^{1}	Farjestad-jr. (SWE-jr.)
166	Matthew Phillips (C)	Canada	Calgary Flames (from Minnesota)^{2}	Victoria Royals (WHL)
167	Filip Larsson (G)	Sweden	Detroit Red Wings	Djurgarden-jr. (SWE-jr.)
168	Konstantin Volkov (G)	Russia	Nashville Predators	SKA-1946 (MHL)
169	Tanner Laczynski (C)	United States	Philadelphia Flyers	Lincoln Stars (USHL)
170	Collin Adams (LW)	United States	New York Islanders	Muskegon Lumberjacks (USHL)
171	Gabriel Fontaine (C)	Canada	New York Rangers	Rouyn-Noranda Huskies (QMJHL)
172	Anthony Salinitri (C)	Canada	Philadelphia Flyers (from Los Angeles)^{3}	Sarnia Sting (OHL)
173	Blake Hillman (D)	United States	Chicago Blackhawks	Denver Pioneers (NCAA)
174	Tyler Wall (G)	Canada	New York Rangers (from Florida)^{4}	Leamington Flyers (GOJHL)
175	Maxim Mamin (C/RW)	Russia	Florida Panthers (from Anaheim)^{5}	CSKA Moscow (KHL)
176	Jakob Stenqvist (D)	Sweden	Dallas Stars	Modo-jr. (SWE-jr.)
177	Chase Priskie (D)	United States	Washington Capitals	Quinnipiac Bobcats (NCAA)
178	Oleg Sosunov (D)	Russia	Tampa Bay Lightning	Loko Yaroslavl (MHL)
179	Nicolas Mattinen (D)	Canada	Toronto Maple Leafs (from St. Louis)^{6}	London Knights (OHL)
180	Mark Shoemaker (D)	Canada	San Jose Sharks	North Bay Battalion (OHL)
181	Joe Masonius (D)	United States	Pittsburgh Penguins	University of Connecticut (NCAA)

Notes

1. The Boston Bruins' sixth-round pick was re-acquired as the result of a trade on June 25, 2015, that sent Carl Soderberg to Colorado in exchange for this pick.
  Colorado previously acquired this pick as the result of a trade on March 2, 2015, that sent Max Talbot and Paul Carey to Boston in exchange for Jordan Caron and this pick.
2. The Minnesota Wild's sixth-round pick went to the Calgary Flames as the result of a trade on February 29, 2016, that sent David Jones to Minnesota in exchange for Niklas Backstrom and this pick.
3. The Los Angeles Kings' sixth-round pick went to the Philadelphia Flyers as the result of a trade on June 27, 2015, that sent Columbus' fourth-round pick in 2015 to Los Angeles in exchange for a fourth-round pick in 2015 and this pick.
4. The Florida Panthers' sixth-round pick went to the New York Rangers as the result of a trade on June 20, 2016, that sent Keith Yandle to Florida in exchange for a conditional fourth-round pick in 2017 and this pick.
5. The Anaheim Ducks' sixth-round pick went the Florida Panthers as the result of a trade on February 29, 2016, that sent Brandon Pirri to Anaheim in exchange for this pick.
6. The St. Louis Blues' sixth-round pick went to the Toronto Maple Leafs as the result of a trade March 2, 2015, that sent Olli Jokinen to St. Louis in exchange for Joakim Lindstrom and this pick (being conditional at the time of the trade). The condition – Toronto will receive a sixth-round pick in 2016 if St. Louis fails to make it to the 2015 Stanley Cup Finals – was converted on April 26, 2015.

=== Round seven ===
#	Player	Nationality	NHL team	College/junior/club team
182	Nikolai Chebykin (LW)	Russia	Toronto Maple Leafs	MVD Balashikha (MHL)
183	Vincent Desharnais (D)	Canada	Edmonton Oilers	Providence Friars (NCAA)
184	Rodrigo Abols (C)	Latvia	Vancouver Canucks	Portland Winterhawks (WHL)
185	Calvin Thurkauf (C)	Switzerland	Columbus Blue Jackets	Kelowna Rockets (WHL)
186	Stepan Falkovsky (D)	Belarus	Calgary Flames	Ottawa 67's (OHL)
187	Arvid Henrikson (D)	Sweden	Montreal Canadiens (from Winnipeg)^{1}	AIK U18 (J18 Elit)
188	Dean Stewart (D)	Canada	Arizona Coyotes	Portage Terriers (MJHL)
189	Austin Osmanski (D)	United States	Buffalo Sabres	Mississauga Steelheads (OHL)
190	Vasily Glotov (C)	Russia	Buffalo Sabres (from Montreal)^{2}	Lvy St. Petersburg (MHL)
191	Travis Barron (LW)	Canada	Colorado Avalanche	Ottawa 67's (OHL)
192	Jeremy Davies (D)	Canada	New Jersey Devils	Bloomington Thunder (USHL)
193	Nick Pastujov (LW)	United States	New York Islanders (from Ottawa)^{3}	U.S. NTDP (USHL)
194	Brett McKenzie (C)	Canada	Vancouver Canucks (from Carolina)^{4}	North Bay Battalion (OHL)
195	Benjamin Finkelstein (D)	United States	Florida Panthers (from Boston)^{5}	Kimball Union Academy Wildcats (US-NH HS)
196	Dmitry Sokolov (RW)	Russia	Minnesota Wild	Sudbury Wolves (OHL)
197	Mattias Elfstrom (LW)	Sweden	Detroit Red Wings	Malmo-jr. (SWE-jr.)
198	Adam Smith (D)	Canada	Nashville Predators	Bowling Green Falcons (NCAA)
199	David Bernhardt (D)	Sweden	Philadelphia Flyers	Djurgarden-jr. (SWE-jr.)
200	David Quenneville (D)	Canada	New York Islanders	Medicine Hat Tigers (WHL)
201	Ty Ronning (RW)	Canada	New York Rangers	Vancouver Giants (WHL)
202	Jacob Friend (D)	Canada	Los Angeles Kings	Owen Sound Attack (OHL)
203	Jake Ryczek (D)	United States	Chicago Blackhawks	Waterloo Black Hawks (USHL)
204	Brayden Chizen (D)	Canada	Minnesota Wild (from Florida)^{6}	Kelowna Rockets (WHL)
205	Tyler Soy (C)	Canada	Anaheim Ducks	Victoria Royals (WHL)
206	Otto Somppi (C)	Finland	Tampa Bay Lightning (from Dallas via Edmonton)^{7}	Halifax Mooseheads (QMJHL)
207	Dmitriy Zaitsev (D)	Russia	Washington Capitals	Wilkes-Barre/Scranton Knights (NAHL)
208	Ryan Lohin (C)	United States	Tampa Bay Lightning	Waterloo Black Hawks (USHL)
209	Nikolaj Krag Christensen (C/LW)	Denmark	St. Louis Blues	Rodovre Mighty Bulls (DEN)
210	Joachim Blichfeld (LW/RW)	Denmark	San Jose Sharks	Malmo-jr. (SWE-jr.)
211	Filip Helt (LW)	Czech Republic	St. Louis Blues (from Pittsburgh)^{8}	Litvinov-jr. (CZE-jr.)

Notes

1. The Winnipeg Jets' seventh-round pick went to the Montreal Canadiens as the result of a trade on June 25, 2016, that sent a seventh-round pick in 2017 to Winnipeg in exchange for this pick.
2. The Montreal Canadiens' seventh-round pick went to the Buffalo Sabres as the result of a trade on March 2, 2015, that sent Torrey Mitchell to Montreal in exchange for Jack Nevins and this pick.
3. The Ottawa Senators' seventh-round pick went the New York Islanders as the result of a trade on February 29, 2016, that sent a conditional third-round pick in 2016 to Ottawa in exchange for Shane Prince and this pick.
4. The Carolina Hurricanes' seventh-round pick went to the Vancouver Canucks as the result of a trade on June 27, 2015, that sent Eddie Lack to Carolina in exchange for a third-round pick in 2015 and this pick.
5. The Boston Bruins' seventh-round pick went to the Florida Panthers as the result of a trade on June 25, 2016, that sent a seventh-round pick in 2017 to Boston in exchange for this pick.
6. The Florida Panthers' seventh-round pick went to the Minnesota Wild as the result of a trade on February 24, 2015, that sent a third-round pick in 2016 to Florida in exchange for Sean Bergenheim and this pick.
7. The Dallas Stars' seventh-round pick went to the Tampa Bay Lightning as the result of a trade on June 27, 2015, that sent Anaheim's seventh-round pick in 2015 to Edmonton in exchange for this pick.
  Edmonton previously acquired this pick as the result of a trade on July 5, 2013, that sent Shawn Horcoff to Dallas in exchange for Philip Larsen and this pick.
8. The Pittsburgh Penguins' seventh-round pick went to the St. Louis Blues as the result of a trade on March 2, 2015, that sent Ian Cole to Pittsburgh in exchange for Robert Bortuzzo and this pick.

== Draftees based on nationality ==
Rank	Country	Selections	Percent	Top selection
	North America	141	66.8%	
1	Canada	89	42.2%	Pierre-Luc Dubois, 3rd
2	United States	52	24.6%	Auston Matthews, 1st
	Europe	70	33.2%	
3	Sweden	25	11.8%	Alexander Nylander, 8th
4	Russia	17	8.1%	Mikhail Sergachev, 9th
5	Finland	15	7.1%	Patrik Laine, 2nd
6	Czech Republic	4	1.9%	Libor Hajek, 37th
7	Denmark	3	1.4%	Mathias From, 143rd
8	Switzerland	2	0.9%	Damien Riat, 117th
9	Belgium	1	0.5%	Wouter Peeters, 83rd
9	Germany	1	0.5%	Manuel Wiederer, 150th
9	Latvia	1	0.5%	Rodrigo Abols, 184th
9	Belarus	1	0.5%	Stepan Falkovsky, 186th

=== North American Draftees by State/Province ===
Rank	State/Province	Selections	Percent	Top selection
1	Ontario	40	19.0%	Michael McLeod, 12th
2	Alberta	14	6.6%	Tyson Jost, 10th
3	Quebec	10	4.7%	Pierre-Luc Dubois, 3rd
3	Minnesota	10	4.7%	Kieffer Bellows, 19th
5	British Columbia	9	4.3%	Dante Fabbro, 17th
6	Michigan	8	3.8%	Max Jones, 24th
7	Saskatchewan	6	2.8%	Kale Clague, 51st
8	Missouri	5	2.4%	Matthew Tkachuk, 6th
8	New York	5	2.4%	Charlie McAvoy, 14th
8	Florida	5	2.4%	Jakob Chychrun, 16th
8	Manitoba	5	2.4%	Brett Howden, 27th
12	Massachusetts	4	1.9%	Matt Filipe, 67th
12	New Jersey	4	1.9%	Cam Dineen, 68th
14	Arizona	2	0.9%	Auston Matthews, 1st
14	Illinois	2	0.9%	Clayton Keller, 7th
14	Pennsylvania	2	0.9%	Chad Krys, 45th
14	Newfoundland and Labrador	2	0.9%	Evan Fitzpatrick, 59th
14	Colorado	2	0.9%	Michael Eyssimont, 142nd
19	Washington	1	0.5%	Dylan Gambrell, 60th
19	Nova Scotia	1	0.5%	Luke Green, 79th
19	Indiana	1	0.5%	Ryan Jones, 121st
19	Connecticut	1	0.5%	Patrick Harper, 138th
19	Ohio	1	0.5%	Timothy Gettinger, 141st
19	Vermont	1	0.5%	Benjamin Finkelstein, 195th

== Draftees based on league ==
Rank	League	Selections
1	(Canada) Ontario Hockey League	48
2	(Canada) Western Hockey League	34
3	United States Hockey League	27
4	(Canada) Quebec Major Junior Hockey League	14
5	(United States) NCAA	13
5	J20 SuperElit (Sweden-Junior)	13
7	(Sweden) Swedish Hockey League	10
8	(Russia) Junior Hockey League (MHL)	9
9	(Finland) Liiga	7
10	Nuorten SM-liiga (Finland-Junior)	5
10	(United States) North American Hockey League	5
10	(United States) U.S. High School	5
13	(Canada) British Columbia Hockey League	3
13	(Russia) Kontinental Hockey League	3
15	Central Canada Hockey League	2
15	(Canada) Ontario Junior Hockey League	2
15	(Switzerland) National League A	2
15	(Sweden) HockeyAllsvenskan (SWE-2)	2
19	(Austria) Austrian Hockey League	1
19	(Czech Republic) Czech Extraliga	1
19	(Czech Republic) Czech Extraliga juniors	1
19	(Denmark) Metal Ligaen	1
19	(Canada) Greater Ontario Junior Hockey League	1
19	(Canada) Manitoba Junior Hockey League	1
19	(Sweden) J18 Elit (SWE-U18)	1

== Draftees based on junior/college team ==
Minimum three selections

Rank	Team (league)	Selections
1	(United States) USA Hockey National Team Development Program (USHL)	12
2	(Canada) London Knights (OHL)	7
3	(Canada) Mississauga Steelheads (OHL)	5
3	(Canada) Calgary Hitmen (WHL)	5
5	(Canada) Kelowna Rockets (WHL)	4
5	(Canada) Victoria Royals (WHL)	4
5	Russia men's national under-18 ice hockey team (MHL)	4
8	(Canada) Windsor Spitfires (OHL)	3
8	(Canada) Sarnia Sting (OHL)	3
8	(Canada) Kitchener Rangers (OHL)	3
8	(United States) Erie Otters (OHL)	3
8	(Canada) Sault Ste. Marie Greyhounds (OHL)	3
8	(United States) Saginaw Spirit (OHL)	3
8	(Canada) North Bay Battalion (OHL)	3
8	(Canada) Red Deer Rebels (WHL)	3
8	(Sweden) Djurgardens IF Hockey-Jr. (J20 SuperElit)	3

== See also ==
- 2013–14 NHL transactions
- 2014–15 NHL transactions
- 2015–16 NHL transactions
- 2016–17 NHL transactions
- 2016–17 NHL season
- List of first overall NHL draft picks
- List of NHL players
