= Jens Hirschberg =

East German long jumper (born 1964)

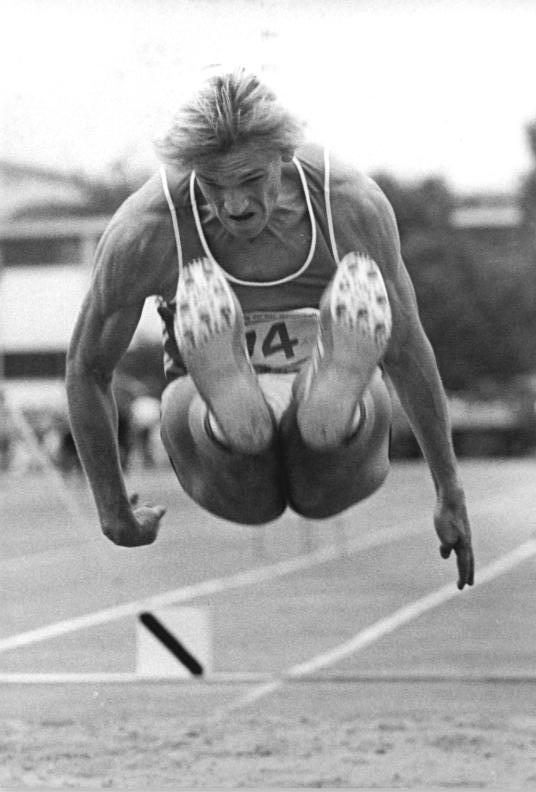
Jens Hirschberg, 1987

Jens Hirschberg (born 6 May 1964) is a retired East German long jumper.

He finished fifth at the 1987 World Championships. He won silver medals at the East German championships in 1987 and 1990, representing the sports club SC Magdeburg.

His personal best jump was 8.18 metres, achieved in June 1987 in Neubrandenburg.
