= West German Athletics Championships =

Annual outdoor track and field competition

- Sport: Track and field
- Founded: 1946
- Folded: 1990
- Country: West Germany
- Related competitions: East German Athletics Championships

The West German Athletics Championships (German: Deutsche Leichtathletik-Meisterschaften) was an annual outdoor track and field competition organised by the German Athletics Association, which served as the West German national championships for the sport. The two- or three-day event was held in summer months, varying from late June to early August, and the venue changed annually.

The German Athletics Championships had a long history, dating back to 1898. After the division of Germany at the end of World War II, the organising body of the all-Germany championships, the German Athletics Association, remained in West Germany. As a result, when the national championships resumed in 1946, only West German athletes could compete in them. This prompted the creation of the East German Athletics Championships.

== Events ==
The following athletics events were held at the West German Championships:

Track

100 metres, 200 metres, 400 metres, 800 metres, 1500 metres, 3000 metres (women only), 5000 metres (men only), 10,000 metres, marathon

Obstacles

100 metres hurdles (women only), 110 metres hurdles (men only), 400 metres hurdles, 3000 metres steeplechase (men only)

Jumping

Pole vault (men only), high jump, long jump, triple jump (men only)

Throwing

Shot put, discus throw, javelin throw, hammer throw (men only)

Combined events

Decathlon (men only), heptathlon (women only)

A men's 200 metres hurdles was held up to the 1965 championships, and a men's pentathlon was on the combined events programme through 1973.

Women's events expanded with the international acceptance of women's athletics. The women's 1500 metres was added in 1968, 3000 metres in 1973, and 10,000 mW ten years later. The 80 metres hurdles was held until 1968, when it was replaced by the international standard 100 metres hurdles. A women's 400 m hurdles was first held in 1975. The last women's pentathlon was held in 1980, then replaced by the new heptathlon event. Women's triple jump, pole vault, hammer throw and steeplechase were not held, as they were not yet standard international events.

== Editions ==
| Edition | Year | Location | Venue | Dates |
|---|---|---|---|---|
| 46. | 1946 | Frankfurt | Waldstadion | 24–25 August 1946 |
| 47. | 1947 | Köln | Müngersdorfer Stadion | 9–10 August 1947 |
| 48. | 1948 | Nürnberg | Städtisches Stadion | 14–15 August 1948 |
| 49. | 1949 | Bremen | Weserstadion | 6–7 August 1949 |
| 50. | 1950 | Stuttgart | Neckarstadion | 5–6 August 1950 |
| 51. | 1951 | Düsseldorf | Rheinstadion | 28–29 July 1951 |
| 52. | 1952 | Berlin | Olympiastadion | 28–29 June 1952 |
| 53. | 1953 | Augsburg | Rosenaustadion | 25–26 July 1953 |
| 54. | 1954 | Hamburg | Volksparkstadion | 6–8 August 1954 |
| 55. | 1955 | Frankfurt | Waldstadion | 4–7 August 1955 |
| 56. | 1956 | Berlin | Olympiastadion | 17–19 August 1956 |
| 57. | 1957 | Düsseldorf | Rheinstadion | 16–18 August 1957 |
| 58. | 1958 | Hannover | Niedersachsenstadion | 18–20 July 1958 |
| 59. | 1959 | Stuttgart | Neckarstadion | 24–26 July 1959 |
| 60. | 1960 | Berlin | Olympiastadion | 22–24 July 1960 |
| 61. | 1961 | Düsseldorf | Rheinstadion | 28–30 July 1961 |
| 62. | 1962 | Hamburg | Volksparkstadion | 27–29 July 1962 |
| 63. | 1963 | Augsburg | Rosenaustadion | 9–11 August 1963 |
| 64. | 1964 | Berlin | Olympiastadion | 7–9 August 1964 |
| 65. | 1965 | Duisburg | Wedaustadion | 6–8 August 1965 |
| 66. | 1966 | Hannover | Niedersachsenstadion | 5–7 August 1966 |
| 67. | 1967 | Stuttgart | Neckarstadion | 4–6 August 1967 |
| 68. | 1968 | Berlin | Olympiastadion | 16–18 August 1968 |
| 69. | 1969 | Düsseldorf | Rheinstadion | 15–17 August 1969 |
| 70. | 1970 | Berlin | Olympiastadion | 7–9 August 1970 |
| 71. | 1971 | Stuttgart | Neckarstadion | 9–11 July 1971 |
| 72. | 1972 | München | Olympiastadion | 19–23 July 1972 |
| 73. | 1973 | Berlin | Olympiastadion | 20–22 July 1973 |
| 74. | 1974 | Hannover | Niedersachsenstadion | 26–28 July 1974 |
| 75. | 1975 | Gelsenkirchen | Parkstadion | 28–29 June 1975 |
| 76. | 1976 | Frankfurt am Main | Waldstadion | 13–15 August 1976 |
| 77. | 1977 | Hamburg | Volksparkstadion | 5–7 August 1977 |
| 78. | 1978 | Köln | Müngersdorfer Stadion | 11–13 August 1978 |
| 79. | 1979 | Stuttgart | Neckarstadion | 10–12 August 1979 |
| 80. | 1980 | Hannover | Niedersachsenstadion | 15–17 August 1980 |
| 81. | 1981 | Gelsenkirchen | Parkstadion | 17–19 July 1981 |
| 82. | 1982 | München | Olympiastadion | 23–25 July 1982 |
| 83. | 1983 | Bremen | Weserstadion | 24–26 June 1983 |
| 84. | 1984 | Düsseldorf | Rheinstadion | 22–24 June 1984 |
| 85. | 1985 | Stuttgart | Neckarstadion | 2–4 August 1985 |
| 86. | 1986 | Berlin | Olympiastadion | 11–13 July 1986 |
| 87. | 1987 | Gelsenkirchen | Parkstadion | 10–12 July 1987 |
| 88. | 1988 | Frankfurt | Waldstadion | 22–24 July 1988 |
| 89. | 1989 | Hamburg | Volksparkstadion | 11–12 August 1989 |
| 90. | 1990 | Düsseldorf | Rheinstadion | 10–12 August 1990 |
