= Vladimir Bobylev =

Russian professional ice hockey forward

Vladimir Bobbalov
- Born: 18 April 1997 (age 29) Lipetsk, Russia
- Height: 6 ft 2 in (188 cm)
- Weight: 230 lb (104 kg; 16 st 6 lb)
- Position: Left wing
- Shoots: Left
- VHL team Former teams: HC Lada Togliatti; Spartak Moscow; Salavat Yulaev Ufa; Traktor Chelyabinsk
- NHL draft: 122nd overall, 2016; Toronto Maple Leafs
- Playing career: 2016–present

Vladimir Aleksandrovich Bobylev (Russian: Владимир Александрович Бобылёв; born 18 April 1997) a Russian ice hockey forward currently competing for HC Lada Togliatti in the Supreme Hockey League (VHL). He was chosen 122nd overall by the Toronto Maple Leafs in the 2016 NHL entry draft.

== Playing career ==
Bobylev began his professional career during the 2016–17 season, appearing in 20 games for HC Spartak Moscow in the Kontinental Hockey League (KHL) after returning to Russia. Following a modest start with only 3 points, he chose to part ways with Spartak and head back to North America to further his development, rejoining his former junior team, the Victoria Royals of the Western Hockey League, on December 9, 2016.

The next summer, Bobylev participated in the Maple Leafs' 2017 training camp, aiming to showcase his skills and compete for a spot within the organization. Following his time with the Maple Leafs, he was reassigned to their AHL affiliate, the Toronto Marlies, where he took part in their training camp to gain additional experience and evaluation at the professional level in North America. However, after the Marlies' camp concluded and facing limited opportunities to secure a full-time role within the Leafs' system, Bobylev opted to return to his native Russia. There, he was traded from his former club, Spartak Moscow, to Salavat Yulaev Ufa, one of the KHL's top teams. Shortly after the trade, he signed a three-year contract with Salavat Yulaev Ufa ahead of the 2017–18 season.

Bobylev spent parts of three seasons developing his game within the Traktor Chelyabinsk organization. On June 25, 2021, he returned to Spartak Moscow, the club where he had launched his professional career. After taking part in Spartak's pre-season training camp and competing for a roster spot, Bobylev was ultimately traded on August 23, 2021, to Lada Togliatti of the Supreme Hockey League (VHL).

== Career statistics ==
			Regular season					Playoffs
Season	Team	League	GP	G	A	Pts	PIM	GP	G	A	Pts	PIM
2013–14	Atlanty Mytishchi	MHL	35	4	4	8	36	3	0	0	0	4
2014–15	Vancouver Giants	WHL	52	3	6	9	39	—	—	—	—	—
2015–16	Victoria Royals	WHL	72	28	39	67	60	5	0	7	7	2
2016–17	HC Spartak Moscow	KHL	20	1	2	3	10	—	—	—	—	—
2016–17	Khimik Voskresensk	VHL	3	1	1	2	0	—	—	—	—	—
2016–17	Victoria Royals	WHL	38	9	27	36	53	6	1	2	3	10
2017–18	Salavat Yulaev Ufa	KHL	3	0	0	0	4	—	—	—	—	—
2017–18	Toros Neftekamsk	VHL	11	0	1	1	6	—	—	—	—	—
2017–18	Tolpar Ufa	MHL	18	8	10	18	39	2	1	0	1	0
2018–19	Salavat Yulaev Ufa	KHL	3	0	0	0	0	—	—	—	—	—
2018–19	Toros Neftekamsk	VHL	53	2	12	14	43	13	1	5	6	35
2019–20	Toros Neftekamsk	VHL	36	11	8	19	36	—	—	—	—	—
2019–20	Traktor Chelyabinsk	KHL	10	0	0	0	0	—	—	—	—	—
2019–20	Chelmet Chelyabinsk	VHL	3	2	0	2	2	—	—	—	—	—
2020–21	Traktor Chelyabinsk	KHL	5	0	0	0	2	—	—	—	—	—
2020–21	Chelmet Chelyabinsk	VHL	35	9	10	19	60	5	0	1	1	2
KHL totals			41	1	2	3	14	—	—	—	—	—
