= East German Athletics Championships =

Former national sport competition

- Sport: Track and field
- Founded: 1948
- Folded: 1990
- Country: East Germany
- Related competitions: West German Athletics Championships

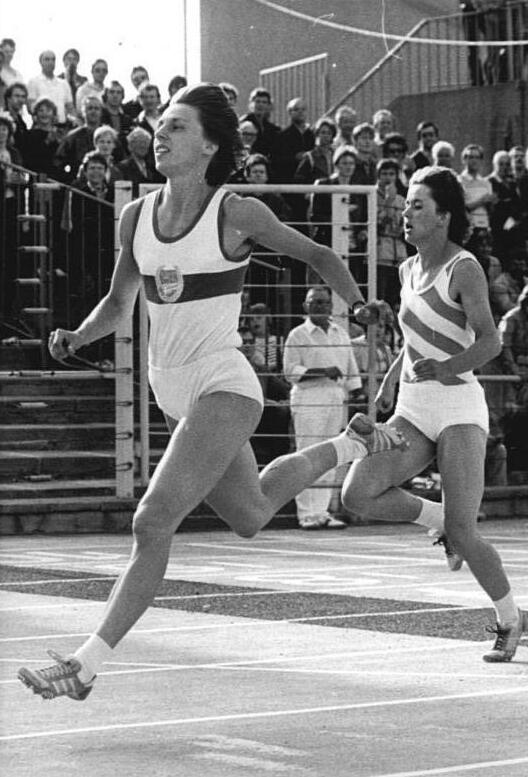
Marita Koch (left) and Marlies Göhr

The East German Athletics Championships (German: DDR Leichtathletik-Meisterschaften) was an annual outdoor track and field competition organised by the East German Athletics Federation, which served as the East German national championships for the sport. The three- or four-day event was held in summer months, varying from June to September, and the venue changed on an annual basis.

The German Athletics Championships had a long history dating back to 1898. Following the division of Germany as part of the end of World War II, the organising body of the all-Germany championships, German Athletics Association, remained based in West Germany. As a result, a new national competition and sports body was created in East Germany, starting from 1948. This competition predated the formal formation of the country, thus the first two editions in 1948 and 1949 were known as Eastern Zone Athletics Championships, reflecting the Soviet occupied area of the country.

== Events ==
The following athletics events were contested at the East German Championships:

Track running

- 100 metres, 200 metres, 400 metres, 800 metres, 1500 metres, 3000 metres (women only), 5000 metres (men only), 10,000 metres, marathon

Obstacle events

- 100 metres hurdles (women only), 110 metres hurdles (men only), 400 metres hurdles, 3000 metres steeplechase (men only)

Jumping events

- Pole vault (men only), high jump, long jump, triple jump (men only)

Throwing events

- Shot put, discus throw, javelin throw, hammer throw (men only)

Walking events

- 10 kilometres race walk (women only), 20 kilometres race walk (men only), 50 kilometres race walk (men only)

Combined events

- Decathlon (men only), heptathlon (women only)

Women competed in the 80 metres hurdles event until 1968, when it was replaced with the new 100 m international standard race. The women's distance races were gradually added, with the 1500 m included in 1967, the 3000 m in 1976, the marathon in 1982, and finally the 10,000 m in 1985. The women's pentathlon was later expanded to the standard heptathlon. Steeplechase, pole vault, triple jump, hammer throw and the 50 km walk remained the preserve of men only over the championships' lifetime.

The men's programme also varied, with early editions featured walks over 10 km, 25 km and 30 km, as well as a 200 metres hurdles race from 1952 to 1965.

== Editions ==
Edition	Year	Location	Venue	Dates
—	1948	Chemnitz	Großkampfbahn	16–19 September 1948
—	1949	Jena	Ernst-Abbe-Sportfeld	16–17 July 1949
1.	1950	Halberstadt	Friedensstadion	22–23 July 1950
2.	1951	Erfurt	Georgi-Dimitroff-Stadion	14–15 July 1951
3.	1952	Jena	Ernst-Abbe-Sportfeld	2–6 July 1952
4.	1953	Leipzig	DHfK-Stadion	18–19 July 1953
5.	1954	Dresden	Rudolf-Harbig-Stadion	23–25 July 1954
6.	1955	Jena	Ernst-Abbe-Sportfeld	2–4 September 1955
7.	1956	Erfurt	Georgi-Dimitroff-Stadion	20–22 July 1956
8.	1957	Berlin	Walter-Ulbricht-Stadion	12–14 July 1957
9.	1958	Jena	Ernst-Abbe-Sportfeld	18–20 July 1958
10.	1959	Leipzig	Zentralstadion	13–15 August 1959
11.	1960	Leipzig	Zentralstadion	22–24 July 1960
12.	1961	Dresden	Heinz-Steyer-Stadion	5–6 August 1961
13.	1962	Dresden	Heinz-Steyer-Stadion	28–30 September 1962
14.	1963	Jena	Ernst-Abbe-Sportfeld	30 August – 1 September 1963
15.	1964	Jena	Ernst-Abbe-Sportfeld	10–12 July 1964
16.	1965	Karl-Marx-Stadt	Ernst-Thälmann-Stadion	23–25 July 1965
17.	1966	Jena	Ernst-Abbe-Sportfeld	20–24 July 1966
18.	1967	Halle	Stadion Robert-Koch-Straße	27–30 July 1967
19.	1968	Erfurt	Georgi-Dimitroff-Stadion	8–11 August 1968
20.	1969	Berlin	Friedrich-Ludwig-Jahn-Sportpark	31 July – 3 August 1969
21.	1970	Erfurt	Georgi-Dimitroff-Stadion	3–5 July 1970
22.	1971	Leipzig	Zentralstadion	25–27 July 1971
23.	1972	Erfurt	Georgi-Dimitroff-Stadion	22–25 June 1972
24.	1973	Dresden	Heinz-Steyer-Stadion	20–22 July 1973
25.	1974	Leipzig	Zentralstadion	4–6 July 1974
26.	1975	Erfurt	Georgi-Dimitroff-Stadion	22–24 August 1975
27.	1976	Karl-Marx-Stadt	Ernst-Thälmann-Stadion	5–8 August 1976
28.	1977	Dresden	Heinz-Steyer-Stadion	30 June – 3 July 1977
29.	1978	Leipzig	Zentralstadion	30 June – 2 July 1978
30.	1979	Karl-Marx-Stadt	Ernst-Thälmann-Stadion	9–12 August 1979
31.	1980	Cottbus	Sportzentrum	16–18 July 1980
32.	1981	Jena	Ernst-Abbe-Sportfeld	7–9 August 1981
33.	1982	Dresden	Heinz-Steyer-Stadion	30 June – 3 July 1982
34.	1983	Karl-Marx-Stadt	Ernst-Thälmann-Stadion	16–18 June 1983
35.	1984	Erfurt	Georgi-Dimitroff-Stadion	1–3 June 1984
36.	1985	Leipzig	Zentralstadion	9–11 August 1985
37.	1986	Jena	Ernst-Abbe-Sportfeld	27–29 June 1986
38.	1987	Potsdam	Stadion Luftschiffhafen	20–22 August 1987
39.	1988	Rostock	Ostseestadion	24–26 June 1988
40.	1989	Neubrandenburg	Jahnstadion	21–23 July 1989
41.	1990	Dresden	Heinz-Steyer-Stadion	17–19 August 1990
