= SC Eintracht Hamm =

German football club

- Full name: Sportclub Eintracht Hamm e.V.
- Founded: 1922
- Dissolved: 2006
- Ground: Marienstadion Hamm
- League: defunct
Home colours	Away colours

SC Eintracht Hamm was a German association football club from the town of Hamm, North Rhine-Westphalia. The club's greatest success has been its two championships in the tier three Oberliga Westfalen in 1982–83, 1984–85. This entitled the club to, unsuccessfully, take part in the promotion round to the 2. Bundesliga in 1983 and 1985.

== History ==
The club's origins date back to 1922 when VfR Heessen was formed. VfR competed on a number of occasions unsuccessfully for promotion to the Gauliga Westfalen, the highest tier of football in Westphalia after 1933. The club continued play during the Second World War until 1944. VfR profited from the availability of workers from local coal mines to play for the club. A firedamp explosion at the Zeche Sachsen mine in 1944 however which claimed 169 lives, including 113 foreign workers, brought play to a halt.

In 1970 VfR Heessen merged with TuS Heessen to form Eintracht Heessen with the new club taking up VfR's place in the Landesliga Westfalen. After ten seasons there a league championship in 1979–80 took the club up to the Verbandsliga. Newly promoted to the Verbandsliga Westfalen the club won the north-east division and earned promotion to the Oberliga Westfalen in 1980–81.

Eintracht Hamm played the next six seasons in the Oberliga, winning the league in 1982–83 and 1984–85 and finishing runners-up in the season between. The two league championships qualified the club for the promotion round to the 2. Bundesliga but it was unsuccessful on both occasions.

In the 1983 2. Bundesliga promotion round Eintrach Hamm faced FC St. Pauli, SC Charlottenburg and Rot-Weiß Oberhausen, with the latter two winning promotion while Hamm finished one point behind Charlottenburg in third place. The club took part in the 1984 German amateur football championship where it reached the final but lost to Offenburger FV 4–1. In the 1985 2. Bundesliga promotion round Hamm played against Hummelsbütteler SV, Rot-Weiss Essen, Tennis Borussia Berlin and VfL Osnabrück. This time the team came fourth, three points behind second placed Tennis Borussia while VfL Osnabrück won the tournament.

The club's rise had been made possible through sponsorship of the local Hammer Bank. When the latter collapsed in November 1984 the fortunes of the club drastically changed. After its failed second attempt in promotion to professional football and the loss of its sponsor the club quickly declined, finishing ninth in 1985–86 and being relegated from the Oberliga the season after, finishing sixteenth. The following season Hamm came sixteenth in the Verbandsliga as well and was relegated from there, too.

Eintracht Hamm struggled financially in the following years, having to accommodate a huge debt. By 1993 the club had however recovered. In 2006 Eintracht Hamm merged with SV 26 Heessen to form SV Eintracht Heessen.

== Honours ==
The club's honours:

- German amateur football championship
  - Runners-up: 1984
- Oberliga Westfalen
  - Champions: 1982–83, 1984–85
  - Runners-up: 1983–84
- Verbandsliga Westfalen
  - Champions: 1980–81
