= Heiko Reski =

German long jumper

Heiko Reski (born 22 August 1963) is a retired West German long jumper.

He finished tenth at the 1987 World Championships. He represented the sports clubs LG Bayer Leverkusen and TV Wattenscheid, and won the silver medal at the West German championships in 1987.

His personal best jump was 8.13 metres, achieved in September 1987 in Gelnhausen.
