= 2018 World Junior Ice Hockey Championships rosters =

Below are the rosters for teams competing in the 2018 World Junior Ice Hockey Championships.

== Group A ==
=== Canada ===
- Head coach: (Canada) Dominique Ducharme

Pos.	No.	Player	Team	NHL Rights
GK	1	Colton Point	(United States) Colgate University	Dallas Stars
GK	31	Carter Hart	(United States) Everett Silvertips	Philadelphia Flyers
D	2	Jake Bean	(Canada) Calgary Hitmen	Carolina Hurricanes
D	3	Conor Timmins	(Canada) Sault Ste. Marie Greyhounds	Colorado Avalanche
D	6	Cal Foote	(Canada) Kelowna Rockets	Tampa Bay Lightning
D	7	Cale Makar	(United States) University of Massachusetts Amherst	Colorado Avalanche
D	8	Dante Fabbro – A	(United States) Boston University	Nashville Predators
D	10	Kale Clague – A	(Canada) Brandon Wheat Kings	Los Angeles Kings
D	28	Victor Mete – A	(Canada) Montreal Canadiens	Montreal Canadiens
F	9	Dillon Dubé – C	(Canada) Kelowna Rockets	Calgary Flames
F	11	Jonah Gadjovich	(Canada) Owen Sound Attack	Vancouver Canucks
F	12	Boris Katchouk	(Canada) Sault Ste. Marie Greyhounds	Tampa Bay Lightning
F	14	Maxime Comtois	(Canada) Victoriaville Tigres	Anaheim Ducks
F	16	Taylor Raddysh	(United States) Erie Otters	Tampa Bay Lightning
F	17	Tyler Steenbergen	(Canada) Swift Current Broncos	Arizona Coyotes
F	19	Drake Batherson	(Canada) Cape Breton Screaming Eagles	Ottawa Senators
F	20	Michael McLeod	(Canada) Mississauga Steelheads	New Jersey Devils
F	21	Brett Howden	(Canada) Moose Jaw Warriors	Tampa Bay Lightning
F	23	Sam Steel	(Canada) Regina Pats	Anaheim Ducks
F	24	Alex Formenton	(Canada) London Knights	Ottawa Senators
F	25	Jordan Kyrou	(Canada) Sarnia Sting	St. Louis Blues
F	27	Robert Thomas	(Canada) London Knights	St. Louis Blues

=== Denmark ===
- Head coach: (Denmark) Olaf Eller

Pos.	No.	Player	Team	NHL Rights
GK	1	Emil Gransøe	(United States) Topeka RoadRunners	
GK	30	Mads Søgaard	(United States) Austin Bruins	
GK	31	Kasper Krog	(Denmark) SønderjyskE Ishockey	
D	2	Oliver Joakim Larsen	(Sweden) Leksands IF	
D	3	Malte Setkov	(Sweden) Malmö Redhawks	Detroit Red Wings
D	4	Christian Larsen	(Denmark) Odense Bulldogs	
D	6	Jakob Jessen	(Denmark) Herning Blue Fox	
D	7	Jeppe Mogensen	(Sweden) AIK IF J20	
D	9	Rasmus Birk Heine	(Denmark) Rødovre Mighty Bulls	
D	14	Lasse Holm Mortensen	(Denmark) Rødovre Mighty Bulls	
F	8	Jacob Schmidt-Svejstrup	(United States) Clarkson University	
F	11	Valdemar Ahlberg	(United States) Austin Bruins	
F	13	Christian Wejse – C	(Denmark) Esbjerg Energy	
F	16	Jonas Røndbjerg	(Sweden) Växjö Lakers	Vegas Golden Knights
F	17	Lucas Andersen	(Finland) Jokerit U20	
F	19	Nikolaj Krag Christensen – A	(Denmark) Rungsted Seier Capital	St. Louis Blues
F	20	Joachim Blichfeld	(United States) Portland Winterhawks	San Jose Sharks
F	21	Daniel Nielsen – A	(Denmark) Herning Blue Fox	
F	22	Andreas Grundtvig	(Denmark) Esbjerg Energy	
F	23	David Madsen	(Sweden) Växjö Lakers	
F	25	Magnus Molge	(Sweden) Malmö J20	
F	27	Phillip Schultz	(Denmark) Rødovre Mighty Bulls	
F	28	Christoffer Gath	(Denmark) Herlev Eagles	

=== Finland ===
- Head coach: (Finland) Jussi Ahokas

Pos.	No.	Player	Team	NHL Rights
G	1	Ukko-Pekka Luukkonen	(Finland) LeKi	Buffalo Sabres
G	30	Lassi Lehtinen	(Finland) KeuPa HT	
G	31	Niilo Halonen	(Finland) SaPKo	
D	2	Miro Heiskanen – A	(Finland) HIFK	Dallas Stars
D	4	Robin Salo	(Finland) Vaasan Sport	New York Islanders
D	5	Eemeli Räsänen	(Canada) Kingston Frontenacs	Toronto Maple Leafs
D	6	Juuso Välimäki – C	(United States) Tri-City Americans	Calgary Flames
D	7	Olli Juolevi	(Finland) TPS	Vancouver Canucks
D	23	Urho Vaakanainen	(Finland) SaiPa	Boston Bruins
D	28	Henri Jokiharju	(United States) Portland Winterhawks	Chicago Blackhawks
D	36	Kasper Kotkansalo	(United States) Boston University	Detroit Red Wings
F	3	Juha Jääskä	(Finland) HIFK	
F	9	Janne Kuokkanen – A	(United States) Charlotte Checkers	Carolina Hurricanes
F	12	Otto Koivula	(Finland) Ilves	New York Islanders
F	13	Kristian Vesalainen	(Finland) HPK	Winnipeg Jets
F	15	Joona Koppanen	(Finland) Ilves	Boston Bruins
F	19	Eetu Tuulola	(Finland) HPK	Calgary Flames
F	20	Eeli Tolvanen	(Finland) Jokerit	Nashville Predators
F	21	Markus Nurmi	(Finland) TPS	Ottawa Senators
F	22	Aapeli Räsänen	(United States) Boston College	Edmonton Oilers
F	27	Joni Ikonen	(Finland) KalPa	Montreal Canadiens
F	32	Aleksi Heponiemi	(Canada) Swift Current Broncos	Florida Panthers
F	33	Jere Innala	(Finland) HPK	
F	34	Rasmus Kupari	(Finland) Kärpät	

=== Slovakia ===
- Head coach: (Slovakia) Ernest Bokroš

Pos.	No.	Player	Team	NHL Rights
G	1	Roman Durný	(Slovakia) HK Orange 20	
G	2	Jakub Kostelný	(Slovakia) HK Dukla Trenčín	
G	30	Dávid Hrenák	(United States) St. Cloud State University	
D	3	Tomáš Hedera	(Slovakia) HK Orange 20	
D	5	Martin Bodák – C	(Canada) Kootenay Ice	
D	6	Martin Fehérváry – A	(Sweden) IK Oskarshamn	
D	7	Marek Korenčík	(Sweden) Luleå J20	
D	9	Dávid Matejovič	(Slovakia) HK Orange 20	
D	12	Michal Ivan	(Canada) Acadie–Bathurst Titan	
D	24	Vojtech Zeleňák	(Slovakia) HK Orange 20	
D	27	Samuel Fereta	(Slovakia) HK Orange 20	
F	4	Erik Smolka	(Slovakia) HK Orange 20	
F	13	Samuel Buček	(United States) Chicago Steel	
F	14	Viliam Čacho – A	(Slovakia) HK Orange 20	
F	16	Filip Krivošík	(Finland) LeKi	
F	17	Miloš Kelemen	(Slovakia) HKm Zvolen	
F	18	Adam Liška	(Canada) Kitchener Rangers	
F	19	Marián Studenič	(Canada) Hamilton Bulldogs	New Jersey Devils
F	20	Peter Kundrík	(Slovakia) HK Orange 20	
F	21	Adam Ružička	(Canada) Sarnia Sting	Calgary Flames
F	23	Samuel Solenský	(United States) Johnstown Tomahawks	
F	25	Alex Tamáši	(Slovakia) HK Orange 20	
F	26	Miloš Roman	(Canada) Vancouver Giants	

=== United States ===
- Head coach: (United States) Bob Motzko

Pos.	No.	Player	Team	NHL Rights
GK	1	Jeremy Swayman	(United States) University of Maine	Boston Bruins
GK	30	Jake Oettinger	(United States) Boston University	Dallas Stars
GK	31	Joseph Woll	(United States) Boston College	Toronto Maple Leafs
D	5	Ryan Lindgren – A	(United States) University of Minnesota	Boston Bruins
D	6	Quinn Hughes	(United States) University of Michigan	Vancouver Canucks
D	8	Adam Fox – A	(United States) Harvard University	Calgary Flames
D	12	Dylan Samberg	(United States) University of Minnesota Duluth	Winnipeg Jets
D	15	Scott Perunovich	(United States) University of Minnesota Duluth	
D	20	Andrew Peeke	(United States) University of Notre Dame	Columbus Blue Jackets
D	24	Mikey Anderson	(United States) University of Minnesota Duluth	Los Angeles Kings
F	4	Ryan Poehling	(United States) St. Cloud State University	Montreal Canadiens
F	7	Brady Tkachuk	(United States) Boston University	Ottawa Senators
F	9	Josh Norris	(United States) University of Michigan	San Jose Sharks
F	10	Will Lockwood	(United States) University of Michigan	Vancouver Canucks
F	11	Casey Mittelstadt	(United States) University of Minnesota	Buffalo Sabres
F	13	Joey Anderson – C	(United States) University of Minnesota Duluth	New Jersey Devils
F	17	Kailer Yamamoto	(United States) Spokane Chiefs	Edmonton Oilers
F	21	Patrick Harper	(United States) Boston University	Nashville Predators
F	22	Logan Brown	(Canada) Windsor Spitfires	Ottawa Senators
F	23	Kieffer Bellows – A	(United States) Portland Winterhawks	New York Islanders
F	27	Riley Tufte	(United States) University of Minnesota Duluth	Dallas Stars
F	34	Trent Frederic	(United States) University of Wisconsin–Madison	Boston Bruins
F	49	Max Jones	(Canada) London Knights	Anaheim Ducks

== Group B ==
=== Belarus ===
- Head coach: (Belarus) Yuri Faikov

Pos.	No.	Player	Team	NHL Rights
G	1	Dmitri Rodik	Belarus U20	
G	20	Andrei Grischenko	Belarus U20	
G	25	Nikita Tolopilo	Belarus U18	
D	3	Andrei Gostev	Belarus U20	
D	4	Vladislav Sokolovsky	(Belarus) Dinamo-Molodechno	
D	5	Dmitri Deryabin	(Belarus) Dinamo Minsk	
D	6	Vladislav Martynyk	(Latvia) KRS Junior	
D	8	Vladislav Yeryomenko	(Canada) Calgary Hitmen	
D	18	Dmitri Burovtsev	Belarus U20	
D	22	Vladislav Gabrus	Belarus U20	
F	7	Viktor Bovbel	(Belarus) Dinamo Minsk	
F	9	Ilya Litvinov	(Belarus) Yunost Minsk	
F	10	Vladislav Ryadchenko – A	Belarus U20	
F	11	Alexander Lukashevich	Belarus U20	
F	12	Igor Martynov	(Canada) Victoria Royals	
F	13	Arseni Astashevich	Belarus U20	
F	14	Sergei Pischuk	Belarus U20	
F	16	Dmitri Grinkevich	Belarus U20	
F	17	Yegor Sharangovich – A	(Belarus) Dinamo Minsk	
F	19	Ivan Drozdov	(Belarus) Yunost Minsk	
F	21	Vladislav Mikalchuk	(Canada) Prince George Cougars	
F	24	Maxim Sushko – C	(Canada) Owen Sound Attack	Philadelphia Flyers
F	26	Nazar Anisimov	Belarus U20	

=== Czech Republic ===
- Head coach: (Czech Republic) Filip Pešán

Pos.	No.	Player	Team	NHL Rights
GK	1	Jakub Škarek	(Czech Republic) HC Dukla Jihlava	
GK	2	Milan Kloucek	(Czech Republic) HC Dynamo Pardubice	
GK	30	Josef Kořenář	(Czech Republic) HC Benátky nad Jizerou	San Jose Sharks
D	3	Libor Hájek	(Canada) Saskatoon Blades	Tampa Bay Lightning
D	7	Radim Salda	(Canada) Saint John Sea Dogs	
D	11	Filip Král	(United States) Spokane Chiefs	
D	14	Ondřej Vála – A	(Canada) Kamloops Blazers	Dallas Stars
D	19	Vojtěch Budík	(Canada) Prince Albert Raiders	Buffalo Sabres
D	23	Jakub Galvas	(Czech Republic) HC Olomouc	Chicago Blackhawks
F	6	Marek Zachar – C	(Canada) Sherbrooke Phoenix	
F	8	Martin Nečas	(Czech Republic) HC Kometa Brno	Carolina Hurricanes
F	15	Daniel Kurovský	(Czech Republic) HC Vítkovice Ridera	
F	16	Martin Kaut	(Czech Republic) HC Dynamo Pardubice	
F	17	Kryštof Hrabík	(Czech Republic) HC Bílí Tygři Liberec	
F	18	Filip Zadina	(Canada) Halifax Mooseheads	
F	20	Jakub Lauko	(Czech Republic) Piráti Chomutov	
F	21	Filip Chytil	(United States) Hartford Wolf Pack	New York Rangers
F	22	Kristian Reichel – A	(Canada) Red Deer Rebels	
F	25	Radovan Pavlík	(Czech Republic) Mountfield HK	
F	27	Ostap Safin	(Canada) Saint John Sea Dogs	Edmonton Oilers
F	28	Petr Kodýtek	(Czech Republic) HC Plzeň	
F	29	Albert Michnáč	(Canada) Mississauga Steelheads	

=== Russia ===
- Head coach: (Russia) Valeri Bragin

Pos.	No.	Player	Team	NHL Rights
GK	1	Alexei Melnichuk	(Russia) SKA-Neva Saint Petersburg	
GK	20	Mikhail Berdin	(United States) Sioux Falls Stampede	Winnipeg Jets
GK	30	Vladislav Sukhachyov	(Russia) Chelmet Chelyabinsk	
D	2	Nikita Makeyev – A	(Russia) CSKA Moscow	
D	4	Alexander Shepelev	(Russia) Chelmet Chelyabinsk	
D	5	Artyom Minulin	(Canada) Swift Current Broncos	
D	6	Yegor Zaitsev – C	(Russia) Dynamo Moscow	New Jersey Devils
D	15	Anatoli Yelizarov	(Russia) Salavat Yulaev Ufa	
D	22	Nikolai Knyzhov	(Russia) SKA-Neva Saint Petersburg	
D	25	Dmitri Samorukov	(Canada) Guelph Storm	Edmonton Oilers
D	26	Vladislav Syomin	(Russia) SKA-Neva Saint Petersburg	
F	7	Dmitry Sokolov	(Canada) Sudbury Wolves	Minnesota Wild
F	10	Artyom Manukyan	(Russia) Avangard Omsk	
F	11	Vitalii Abramov	(Canada) Victoriaville Tigres	Columbus Blue Jackets
F	12	Georgi Ivanov	(Russia) Lokomotiv Yaroslavl	
F	13	Mikhail Maltsev – A	(Russia) SKA Saint Petersburg	New Jersey Devils
F	14	Andrei Svechnikov	(Canada) Barrie Colts	
F	16	Andrei Altybarmakyan	(Russia) SKA Saint Petersburg	Chicago Blackhawks
F	17	German Rubtsov	(Canada) Acadie–Bathurst Titan	Philadelphia Flyers
F	19	Marsel Sholokhov	(Russia) Traktor Chelyabinsk	
F	24	Klim Kostin	(United States) San Antonio Rampage	St. Louis Blues
F	27	Alexei Polodyan	(Russia) SKA-Neva Saint Petersburg	
F	28	Artur Kayumov	(Russia) Lokomotiv Yaroslavl	Chicago Blackhawks

=== Sweden ===
- Head coach: (Sweden) Tomas Montén

Pos.	No.	Player	Team	NHL Rights
GK	1	Filip Larsson	(United States) Tri-City Storm	Detroit Red Wings
GK	30	Filip Gustavsson	(Sweden) Luleå HF	
GK	35	Olle Eriksson Ek	(Sweden) Färjestad J20	Anaheim Ducks
D	5	Gustav Lindström	(Sweden) Almtuna IS	Detroit Red Wings
D	6	Linus Högberg	(Sweden) Växjö Lakers	Philadelphia Flyers
D	7	Timothy Liljegren	(Canada) Toronto Marlies	Toronto Maple Leafs
D	8	Rasmus Dahlin	(Sweden) Frölunda HC	
D	23	Jesper Sellgren	(Sweden) Modo Hockey	
D	26	Erik Brännström – A	(Sweden) HV71	Vegas Golden Knights
D	27	Jacob Moverare – A	(Canada) Mississauga Steelheads	Los Angeles Kings
F	9	Tim Söderlund	(Sweden) Skellefteå AIK	Chicago Blackhawks
F	10	Marcus Davidsson	(Sweden) Djurgårdens IF	Buffalo Sabres
F	12	Glenn Gustafsson	(Sweden) Örebro HK	
F	14	Elias Pettersson	(Sweden) Växjö Lakers	Vancouver Canucks
F	16	Linus Lindström	(Sweden) Skellefteå AIK	Calgary Flames
F	17	Fredrik Karlström	(Sweden) Linköpings HC	Dallas Stars
F	19	Alexander Nylander – A	(United States) Rochester Americans	Buffalo Sabres
F	20	Isac Lundeström	(Sweden) Luleå HF	
F	21	Jesper Boqvist	(Sweden) Brynäs IF	New Jersey Devils
F	22	Axel Jonsson Fjällby	(Sweden) Djurgårdens IF	Washington Capitals
F	24	Lias Andersson – C	(Sweden) Frölunda HC	New York Rangers
F	28	Fabian Zetterlund	(Sweden) Färjestad BK	New Jersey Devils
F	29	Oskar Steen	(Sweden) Färjestad BK	Boston Bruins

=== Switzerland ===
- Head coach: (Switzerland) Christian Wohlwend

Pos.	No.	Player	Team	NHL Rights
G	1	Matteo Ritz	(Switzerland) HC Sion	
G	29	Akira Schmid	(Switzerland) Langnau U20	
G	30	Philip Wüthrich	(Switzerland) Bern U20	
D	4	Simon Le Coultre	(Canada) Moncton Wildcats	
D	8	Davyd Barandun	(Switzerland) Davos U20	
D	12	Tobias Geisser	(Switzerland) EV Zug	Washington Capitals
D	16	Nico Gross – A	(Canada) Oshawa Generals	
D	17	Elia Riva	(Switzerland) HC Lugano	
D	21	Tim Berni	(Switzerland) GCK Lions	
D	27	Dominik Egli	(Switzerland) EHC Kloten	
F	9	Nicolas Müller	(Sweden) Modo J20	
F	10	Guillaume Maillard	(Switzerland) Genève-Servette HC	
F	11	Marco Miranda – A	(Switzerland) ZSC Lions	
F	13	Justin Sigrist	(Canada) Kamloops Blazers	
F	14	Ken Jäger	(Switzerland) Davos U20	
F	18	Valentin Nussbaumer	(Switzerland) EHC Biel	
F	19	Axel Simic	(Switzerland) Lausanne HC	
F	20	Sven Leuenberger	(Switzerland) EVZ Academy	
F	22	Nando Eggenberger – C	(Switzerland) HC Davos	
F	23	Philipp Kurashev	(Canada) Quebec Remparts	
F	24	André Heim	(Switzerland) SC Bern	
F	26	Marco Cavalleri	(Canada) Victoriaville Tigres	
F	28	Dario Rohrbach	(Switzerland) EHC Basel	
