= 2015 Ivan Hlinka Memorial Tournament =

Tournament details
- Host countries: Slovakia; Czech Republic
- Venue(s): 2 (in 2 host cities)
- Dates: 10–15 August 2015
- Teams: 8

Final positions
- Champions: Canada
- Runner-up: Sweden
- Third place: Russia
- Fourth place: Finland

Tournament statistics
- Games played: 18
- Scoring leader(s): (United States) Kailer Yamamoto (United States) Casey Mittelstadt (7 points)

Official website
- hlinkamemorial.com

The 2015 Ivan Hlinka Memorial Tournament was an under-18 international ice hockey tournament held in Břeclav, Czech Republic and Bratislava, Slovakia from 10 to 15 August 2015.

== Preliminary round ==
All times are Central European Summer Time (UTC+2).

=== Group A ===
Pos	Team	Pld	W	OTW	OTL	L	GF	GA	GD	Pts	Qualification
1	Canada	3	3	0	0	0	14	3	+11	9	Semifinals
2	Sweden	3	2	0	0	1	6	5	+1	6	Semifinals
3	Czech Republic	3	1	0	0	2	6	8	−2	3	Fifth place game
4	Switzerland	3	0	0	0	3	8	18	−10	0	Seventh place game

10 August 2015; 15:30	Sweden	4–3 (1–1, 2–0, 1–2)	Switzerland	Ice BORS Arena, Břeclav; Attendance: 386

Game reference

Filip Gustavsson
Goalies
Philip Wüthrich
Referees:
(Czech Republic) Robert Čech
(Czech Republic) Roman Polák
Linesmen:
(Czech Republic) Jaromír Bryška
(Czech Republic) Přemysl Skopal

	0–1	05:59 – Hischier (Stadler) (PP)
Nylander (Brännström, Boqvist) (PP) – 16:52	1–1
Fällström (Weissbach, Deutsch) – 24:56	2–1
Bratt (Nylander, Deutsch) – 36:20	3–1
	3–2	43:52 – Volejnicek (Miranda) (PP)
	3–3	46:45 – Volejnicek (Stadler, Andersson) (PP2)
Cederholm (Fällström) (PP) – 59:39	4–3

34 min
Penalties
51 min
39
Shots
25

10 August 2015; 19:10	Czech Republic	1–3 (1–2, 0–0, 0–1)	Canada	Ice BORS Arena, Břeclav; Attendance: 1,846

Game reference

Adam Brízgala
Goalies
Carter Hart
Referees:
(Czech Republic) René Hradil
(Czech Republic) Robin Šír
Linesmen:
(Czech Republic) Marek Hlavatý
(Czech Republic) Rudolf Tošenovjan

Kantner (Reichel, Kachyňa) – 03:18	1–0
	1–1	06:11 – Dubé (McLeod) (SH)
	1–2	15:11 – Patrick (Dubois)
	1–3	48:56 – Malenstyn (Bean)

4 min
Penalties
12 min
16
Shots
40

11 August 2015; 15:30	Canada	2–0 (1–0, 0–0, 1–0)	Sweden	Ice BORS Arena, Břeclav

Game reference
Dylan Wells	Goalies	Filip Gustavsson	Referees: (Czech Republic) René Hradil (Czech Republic) Robin Šír; Linesmen: (Czech Republic) Marek Hlavatý (Czech Republic) Rudolf Tošenovjan
McLeod (Quenneville) – 08:23 / 1–0; Bitten (Mete) (ENG) – 59:40 / 2–0			Referees: (Czech Republic) René Hradil (Czech Republic) Robin Šír; Linesmen: (Czech Republic) Marek Hlavatý (Czech Republic) Rudolf Tošenovjan
8 min	Penalties	10 min	Referees: (Czech Republic) René Hradil (Czech Republic) Robin Šír; Linesmen: (Czech Republic) Marek Hlavatý (Czech Republic) Rudolf Tošenovjan
35	Shots	17	Referees: (Czech Republic) René Hradil (Czech Republic) Robin Šír; Linesmen: (Czech Republic) Marek Hlavatý (Czech Republic) Rudolf Tošenovjan

11 August 2015; 19:10	Czech Republic	5–3 (1–0, 1–1, 3–2)	Switzerland	Ice BORS Arena, Břeclav; Attendance: 1,780

Game reference

Josef Kořenář
Goalies
Matteo Ritz
Referees:
(Czech Republic) Martin Fraňo
(Czech Republic) Jan Hribik
Linesmen:
(Czech Republic) Miroslav Lhotský
(Czech Republic) Josef Špůr

Kodýtek (PP) – 11:21	1–0
	1–1	23:19 – Stadler (Miranda) (PP)
Kofroň (Hrdinka, Reichel) – 23:44	2–1
Zachar (Kodýtek) – 40:57	3–1
Kofroň (Zachar) – 49:10	4–1
	4–2	49:42 – Lerch (Gerber)
	4–3	55:56 – Brantschen (Suter, Hischier)
Pavlík (ENG) – 59:44	5–3

6 min
Penalties
18 min
39
Shots
29

12 August 2015; 15:30	Switzerland	2–9 (1–4, 1–2, 0–3)	Canada	Ice BORS Arena, Břeclav; Attendance: 314

Game reference

Philip Wüthrich
Goalies
Carter Hart
Referees:
(Czech Republic) Martin Fraňo
(Czech Republic) Jan Hribik
Linesmen:
(Czech Republic) Miroslav Lhotský
(Czech Republic) Josef Špůr

	0–1	05:41 – Benson (Malenstyn)
	0–2	08:36 – Jost (Dubois, Steel) (PP)
	0–3	14:10 – Clague (Kyrou, Patrick) (PP)
	0–4	16:47 – Jost (Dubé, Bitten)
Oehen (Geisser, Zwissler) – 17:22	1–4
Hischier (Stadler, Andersson) – 25:46	2–4
	2–5	27:22 – Girard (Benson, Steel)
	2–6	30:02 – Jost (Dubé)
	2–7	53:03 – Patrick (Poirier, Benson)
	2–8	53:49 – Steel (Howden, Dubois)
	2–9	56:12 – Mahura (Patrick, Benson)

14 min
Penalties
2 min
15
Shots
49

12 August 2015; 19:10	Czech Republic	0–2 (0–0, 0–0, 0–2)	Sweden	Ice BORS Arena, Břeclav; Attendance: 2,760

Game reference
Adam Brízgala	Goalies	Filip Gustavsson	Referees: (Czech Republic) Vladimír Pešina (Czech Republic) Daniel Pražák; Linesmen: (Czech Republic) Jiří Gebauer (Czech Republic) Vít Lederer
0–1 / 45:06 – Bratt (Fällström, Nylander); 0–2 / 50:50 – Stål Lyrenäs (Lindström)			Referees: (Czech Republic) Vladimír Pešina (Czech Republic) Daniel Pražák; Linesmen: (Czech Republic) Jiří Gebauer (Czech Republic) Vít Lederer
12 min	Penalties	20 min	Referees: (Czech Republic) Vladimír Pešina (Czech Republic) Daniel Pražák; Linesmen: (Czech Republic) Jiří Gebauer (Czech Republic) Vít Lederer
17	Shots	21	Referees: (Czech Republic) Vladimír Pešina (Czech Republic) Daniel Pražák; Linesmen: (Czech Republic) Jiří Gebauer (Czech Republic) Vít Lederer

=== Group B ===
Pos	Team	Pld	W	OTW	OTL	L	GF	GA	GD	Pts	Qualification
1	Finland	3	3	0	0	0	12	3	+9	9	Semifinals
2	Russia	3	2	0	0	1	10	7	+3	6	Semifinals
3	United States	3	1	0	0	2	10	13	−3	3	Fifth place game
4	Slovakia	3	0	0	0	3	7	16	−9	0	Seventh place game

10 August 2015; 14:00	Finland	5–1 (4–0, 1–1, 0–0)	United States	Ondrej Nepela Arena, Bratislava; Attendance: 284

Game reference

Severi Isokangas
Goalies
Stephen Dhillon
Dayton Rasmussen
Referees:
(Slovakia) Jozef Kubuš
(Slovakia) Vladimír Goga
Linesmen:
(Slovakia) Peter Tvrdoň
(Slovakia) Roman Návratek

Mäkinen (Jokiharju, Kuokkanen) – 07:58	1–0
Tuulola (Somppi) – 10:44	2–0
Salo (Oksanen, Mäkinen) (PP) – 14:22	3–0
Somppi (Räsänen, Tuulola) (PP) – 18:17	4–0
	4–1	36:09 – Gettinger (Lown, Gleason)
Mäkinen (Kuokkanen) – 38:37	5–1

12 min
Penalties
16 min
34
Shots
15

10 August 2015; 17:30	Slovakia	2–5 (1–3, 0–1, 1–1)	Russia	Ondrej Nepela Arena, Bratislava; Attendance: 1,228

Game reference

Jan Kožiak
Goalies
Maxim Kalyayev
Referees:
(Slovakia) Vladimír Baluška
(Slovakia) Daniel Konc
Linesmen:
(Slovakia) Roman Výleta
(Slovakia) Peter Šefčík

	0–1	06:30 – Afanasyev (Popugayev, Gromov) (PP)
Roman (Galbavý) (PP) – 08:54	1–1
	1–2	09:11 – Veryayev (Ivanyuzhenkov)
	1–3	12:15 – Avramenko (Meshcheryakov, Geraskin)
	1–4	23:11 – Kayumov (Avramenko, Shvyryov)
	1–5	43:01 – Shevchenko (Veryayev, Ivanyuzhenkov)
Studenič (Buček, Bodák) – 52:07	2–5

8 min
Penalties
10 min
33
Shots
31

11 August 2015; 14:00	United States	2–5 (1–1, 0–2, 1–2)	Russia	Ondrej Nepela Arena, Bratislava; Attendance: 421

Game reference

Dayton Rasmussen
Goalies
Vladislav Sukhachyov
Referees:
(Slovakia) Milan Novák
(Slovakia) Peter Lokšík
Linesmen:
(Slovakia) Roman Výleta
(Slovakia) Peter Šefčík

	0–1	16:10 – Yakovenko (Kayumov, Ivanov) (PP)
Mittelstadt (Peeke, Lown) – 19:46	1–1
	1–2	39:40 – Geraskin (Alexeyev, Meshcheryakov) (PP)
	1–3	39:58 – Popugayev (Akhmetgaliev)
	1–4	41:41 – Ivanov (Popugayev, Makeev) (PP)
Yamamoto (Rossini) (PP) – 42:17	2–4
	2–5	47:31 – Yakovenko (Veryayev, Rubtsov)

58 min
Penalties
28 min
39
Shots
23

11 August 2015; 17:30	Slovakia	2–4 (1–3, 0–1, 1–0)	Finland	Ondrej Nepela Arena, Bratislava; Attendance: 1,328

Game reference

Roman Durný
Goalies
Niilo Halonen
Referees:
(Slovakia) Vladimír Baluška
(Slovakia) Vladimír Goga
Linesmen:
(Slovakia) Šimon Synek
(Slovakia) Peter Tvrdoň

	0–1	03:42 – Salo (Niemeläinen, Tuulola) (PP)
	0–2	09:36 – Tolvanen (Räsänen)
	0–3	11:11 – Mäkinen (Kuokkanen)
Galbavý (Václav) – 17:13	1–3
	1–4	36:53 – Koivula (Niemeläinen, Tolvanen)
Kmec (Bodák, Roman) – 47:49	2–4

14 min
Penalties
24 min
26
Shots
29

12 August 2015; 14:00	Russia	0–3 (0–0, 0–1, 0–2)	Finland	Ondrej Nepela Arena, Bratislava; Attendance: 378

Game reference

Maxim Kalyayev
Goalies
Severi Isokangas
Referees:
(Slovakia) Milan Novák
(Slovakia) Vladimír Goga
Linesmen:
(Slovakia) Peter Tvrdoň
(Slovakia) Michal Orolin

0–1	26:19 – Mäkinen (Kuokkanen, Reunanen)
0–2	46:29 – Oksanen (Kuokkanen)
0–3	49:32 – Tuulola (Räsänen, Somppi) (PP)

18 min
Penalties
14 min
22
Shots
34

12 August 2015; 17:30	Slovakia	3–7 (0–2, 1–2, 2–3)	United States	Ondrej Nepela Arena, Bratislava; Attendance: 1,278

Game reference

Jan Kožiak
Goalies
Stephen Dhillon
Referees:
(Slovakia) Peter Lokšík
(Slovakia) Róbert Müllner
Linesmen:
(Slovakia) Roman Výleta
(Slovakia) Peter Šefčík

	0–1	02:02 – Knierim (Yamamoto, Mittelstadt) (PP)
	0–2	07:35 – Mittelstadt (Knierim, Gettinger)
	0–3	23:03 – Rymsha (Leonard)
	0–4	26:02 – Gettinger (Yamamoto, Mittelstadt)
Buček (Kmec, Roman) – 36:46	1–4
Kmec (Roman, Galbavý) (PP) – 48:33	2–4
Solenský (Bodák, Buček) (PP) – 55:21	3–4
	3–5	55:55 – Yamamoto (Gettinger)
	3–6	57:31 – Berger
	3–7	58:46 – Leonard (Rymsha, Wait)

20 min
Penalties
16 min
33
Shots
40

== Final round ==
=== Seventh place game ===
14 August 2015; 14:00	Slovakia	5–6 GWS (1–2, 3–1, 1–2); OT: (0–0); SO: (0–1)	Switzerland	Ondrej Nepela Arena, Bratislava; Attendance: 328

Game reference

Roman Durný
Goalies
Matteo Ritz
Philip Wüthrich
Referees:
(Slovakia) Milan Novák
(Slovakia) Róbert Müllner
Linesmen:
(Slovakia) Peter Tvrdoň
(Slovakia) Lukáš Kacej

	0–1	04:41 – Hischier (SH)
Ružička (Čacho, Lacka) – 15:24	1–1
	1–2	17:37 – Suter (Roberts, Riva) (PP)
Buček – 20:30	2–2
Zeleňák (Studenič, Solenský) (PP) – 23:29	3–2
	3–3	28:11 – Miranda (Hischier)
Lacka (Bodák, Ružička) – 35:23	4–3
Solenský (Bodák) – 47:21	5–3
	5–4	47:47 – Miranda (Hischier, Stadler)
	5–5	59:33 – Heim (Weder, Roberts) (EA)

Buček
Solenský
Bodák (miss)
Buček (miss)
Shootout
Roberts
Miranda
(miss) Hischier
Roberts
8 min
Penalties
10 min
28
Shots
25

=== Fifth place game ===
14 August 2015; 15:40	Czech Republic	3–4 (1–0, 1–3, 1–1)	United States	Ice BORS Arena, Břeclav; Attendance: 649

Game reference

Josef Kořenář
Goalies
Stephen Dhillon
Referees:
(Czech Republic) René Hradil
(Czech Republic) Roman Mrkva
Linesmen:
(Czech Republic) Přemysl Skopal
(Czech Republic) Rudolf Tošenovjan

Najman (Hájek) – 09:08	1–0
	1–1	20:31 – Mittelstadt (Yamamoto, Dineen) (PP)
	1–2	22:03 – Farmer
	1–3	23:48 – Yamamoto (Mittelstadt)
Reichel (Kofroň, Zachar) (PP) – 36:04	2–3
	2–4	42:09 – Yamamoto (Mittelstadt, Dineen) (PP2)
Zachar (Doudera, Hrdinka) (EA) – 58:56	3–4

16 min
Penalties
32 min
38
Shots
30

=== Semifinals ===
14 August 2015; 17:30	Finland	1–2 (1–1, 0–0, 0–1)	Sweden	Ondrej Nepela Arena, Bratislava; Attendance: 321

Game reference

Severi Isokangas
Goalies
Filip Gustavsson
Referees:
(Slovakia) Jozef Kubuš
(Slovakia) Daniel Konc
Linesmen:
(Slovakia) Peter Šefčík
(Slovakia) Roman Výleta

	0–1	07:07 – Deutsch (Brännström, Nylander) (PP)
Jääskä (Moilanen) – 09:08	1–1
	1–2	46:47 – Fällström (Tilander, Bratt)

6 min
Penalties
6 min
39
Shots
29

14 August 2015; 19:00	Canada	2–1 GWS (0–1, 1–0, 0–0); OT: (0–0); SO: (1–0)	Russia	Ice BORS Arena, Břeclav; Attendance: 528

Game reference
Dylan Wells	Goalies	Vladislav Sukhachyov	Referees: (Czech Republic) Pavel Hodek (Czech Republic) Robin Šír; Linesmen: (Czech Republic) Jiří Gebauer (Czech Republic) Vít Lederer
/ 0–1 / 19:11 – Rubtsov (Yakovenko, Kayumov); Kyrou (Benson) (PP) – 25:44 / 1–1			Referees: (Czech Republic) Pavel Hodek (Czech Republic) Robin Šír; Linesmen: (Czech Republic) Jiří Gebauer (Czech Republic) Vít Lederer
Patrick; Jost (miss); Dubé (miss)	Shootout	(miss) Shvyryov; (miss) Makeev; (miss) Ivanov	Referees: (Czech Republic) Pavel Hodek (Czech Republic) Robin Šír; Linesmen: (Czech Republic) Jiří Gebauer (Czech Republic) Vít Lederer
10 min	Penalties	10 min	Referees: (Czech Republic) Pavel Hodek (Czech Republic) Robin Šír; Linesmen: (Czech Republic) Jiří Gebauer (Czech Republic) Vít Lederer
47	Shots	18	Referees: (Czech Republic) Pavel Hodek (Czech Republic) Robin Šír; Linesmen: (Czech Republic) Jiří Gebauer (Czech Republic) Vít Lederer

=== Bronze medal game ===
15 August 2015; 15:00	Finland	3–4 (2–1, 1–0, 0–3)	Russia	Ondrej Nepela Arena, Bratislava; Attendance: 428

Game reference

Severi Isokangas
Goalies
Maxim Kalyayev
Vladislav Sukhachyov
Referees:
(Slovakia) Vladimír Baluška
(Slovakia) Daniel Konc
Linesmen:
(Slovakia) Peter Šefčík
(Slovakia) Roman Výleta

	0–1	02:34 – Shevchenko (Veryayev, Alexeyev) (PP)
Jääskä (Moilanen) – 11:00	1–1
Välimäki (Kuokkanen) – 16:02	2–1
Koppanen (Jokiharju) – 23:07	3–1
	3–2	40:27 – Popugayev (Kayumov, Rubtsov) (PP)
	3–3	50:48 – Popugayev (Rubtsov) (PP)
	3–4	52:37 – Kayumov (Popugayev)

6 min
Penalties
6 min
38
Shots
21

=== Gold medal game ===
15 August 2015; 17:10	Canada	7–3 (4–0, 2–1, 1–2)	Sweden	Ice BORS Arena, Břeclav; Attendance: 654

Game reference

Dylan Wells
Goalies
Filip Gustavsson
Isak Wallin
Referees:
(Czech Republic) Pavel Hodek
(Czech Republic) Robin Šír
Linesmen:
(Czech Republic) Jiří Gebauer
(Czech Republic) Vít Lederer

Dubois – 02:28	1–0
Dubois (Girard) (PP) – 11:17	2–0
McLeod (Kaspick) – 15:59	3–0
Benson (Girard) – 16:54	4–0
Kaspick (McLeod) – 27:14	5–0
	5–1	33:19 – Bratt (Fällström, Deutsch)
Kyrou (Patrick, Mete) (PP) – 39:21	6–1
	6–2	41:19 – Nylander (Brännström, Bratt) (PP)
	6–3	42:42 – Fällström (Nylander, Tilander) (PP)
Malenstyn (Jost, Dubois) – 51:13	7–3

33 min
Penalties
10 min
35
Shots
18

== Final standings ==
Rk.	Team
1st place, gold medalist(s)	Canada
2nd place, silver medalist(s)	Sweden
3rd place, bronze medalist(s)	Russia
4.	Finland
5.	United States
6.	Czech Republic
7.	Switzerland
8.	Slovakia

== See also ==
- 2015 IIHF World U18 Championships
- 2015 World Junior Championships
