= Jacob Cederholm =

Swedish ice hockey player (born 1998)

- Born: January 30, 1998 (age 28) Helsingborg, Sweden
- Height: 6 ft 3 in (191 cm)
- Weight: 181 lb (82 kg; 12 st 13 lb)
- Position: Defence
- Shot: Right
- Played for: HV71; Manitoba Moose
- NHL draft: 97th overall, 2016; Winnipeg Jets
- Playing career: 2014–2021

Jacob Cederholm (born January 30, 1998) is a Swedish former professional ice hockey defenceman. He was selected 97th overall in the 2016 NHL entry draft by the Winnipeg Jets. He is the younger brother of Anton who also plays in Sweden and was drafted by the Vancouver Canucks.

== Playing career ==
At the age of 16, Cederholm made his Swedish Hockey League debut playing with HV71 during the 2014–15 SHL season. In the 2016–17 season, Cederholm was loaned out to continue his development on loan with IK Pantern of the HockeyAllsvenskan.

At the conclusion of the 2017–18 season, Cederholm left HV71 and Sweden for North America, agreeing to an initial professional try-out contract with the Manitoba Moose in the AHL, affiliate of the Winnipeg Jets on April 5, 2018. He appeared in 1 regular season game with the Moose and remained on the roster as a healthy scratch through the post-season.

As a free agent, Cederholm secured a one-year AHL contract to continue his development with the Manitoba Moose, on July 3, 2018.

At the conclusion of his contract with the Manitoba Moose, Cederholm opted to remain in the ECHL, returning for a third season with affiliate the Jacksonville Icemen on 8 September 2020. After 33 regular season games with the Icemen, posting 1 goal and 4 points in the 2020–21 season, Cederholm opted to retire from professional hockey having played 7 seasons on May 28, 2021.

== Career statistics ==
=== Regular season and playoffs ===
			Regular season					Playoffs
Season	Team	League	GP	G	A	Pts	PIM	GP	G	A	Pts	PIM
2012–13	Jonstorps IF	J20 Div.1	9	0	5	5	4	4	0	1	1	0
2013–14	Jonstorps IF	J20 Div.1	12	3	3	6	4	—	—	—	—	—
2014–15	HV71	J20	16	1	0	1	8	3	0	0	0	0
2014–15	HV71	SHL	3	0	0	0	0	—	—	—	—	—
2015–16	HV71	J20	35	1	4	5	28	3	2	0	2	2
2015–16	HV71	SHL	9	0	0	0	0	—	—	—	—	—
2016–17	HV71	J20	8	0	2	2	12	6	0	2	2	2
2016–17	HV71	SHL	5	0	0	0	0	—	—	—	—	—
2016–17	IK Pantern	Allsv	34	1	5	6	16	4	0	1	1	4
2017–18	HV71	J20	5	1	0	1	4	2	0	0	0	2
2017–18	HV71	SHL	10	0	0	0	2	—	—	—	—	—
2017–18	Västerviks IK	Allsv	2	0	0	0	2	—	—	—	—	—
2017–18	IK Oskarshamn	Allsv	17	0	1	1	8	—	—	—	—	—
2017–18	Manitoba Moose	AHL	1	0	0	0	0	—	—	—	—	—
2018–19	Jacksonville Icemen	ECHL	25	1	5	6	8	6	1	0	1	4
2018–19	Manitoba Moose	AHL	9	0	0	0	4	—	—	—	—	—
2019–20	Jacksonville Icemen	ECHL	45	0	7	7	30	—	—	—	—	—
2020–21	Jacksonville Icemen	ECHL	33	1	3	4	35	—	—	—	—	—
SHL totals			27	0	0	0	2	—	—	—	—	—

Medal record

Representing Sweden

Ice hockey

World U18 Championships
Silver medal – second place	2016 United States	

=== International ===
Year	Team	Event	Result	GP	G	A	Pts	PIM
2014	Sweden	U17	3rd place, bronze medalist(s)	6	0	0	0	2
2015	Sweden	IH18	2nd place, silver medalist(s)	5	1	0	1	12
2016	Sweden	WJC18	2nd place, silver medalist(s)	7	0	0	0	6
Junior totals				18	1	0	1	20
