= Otto Somppi =

Finnish ice hockey player

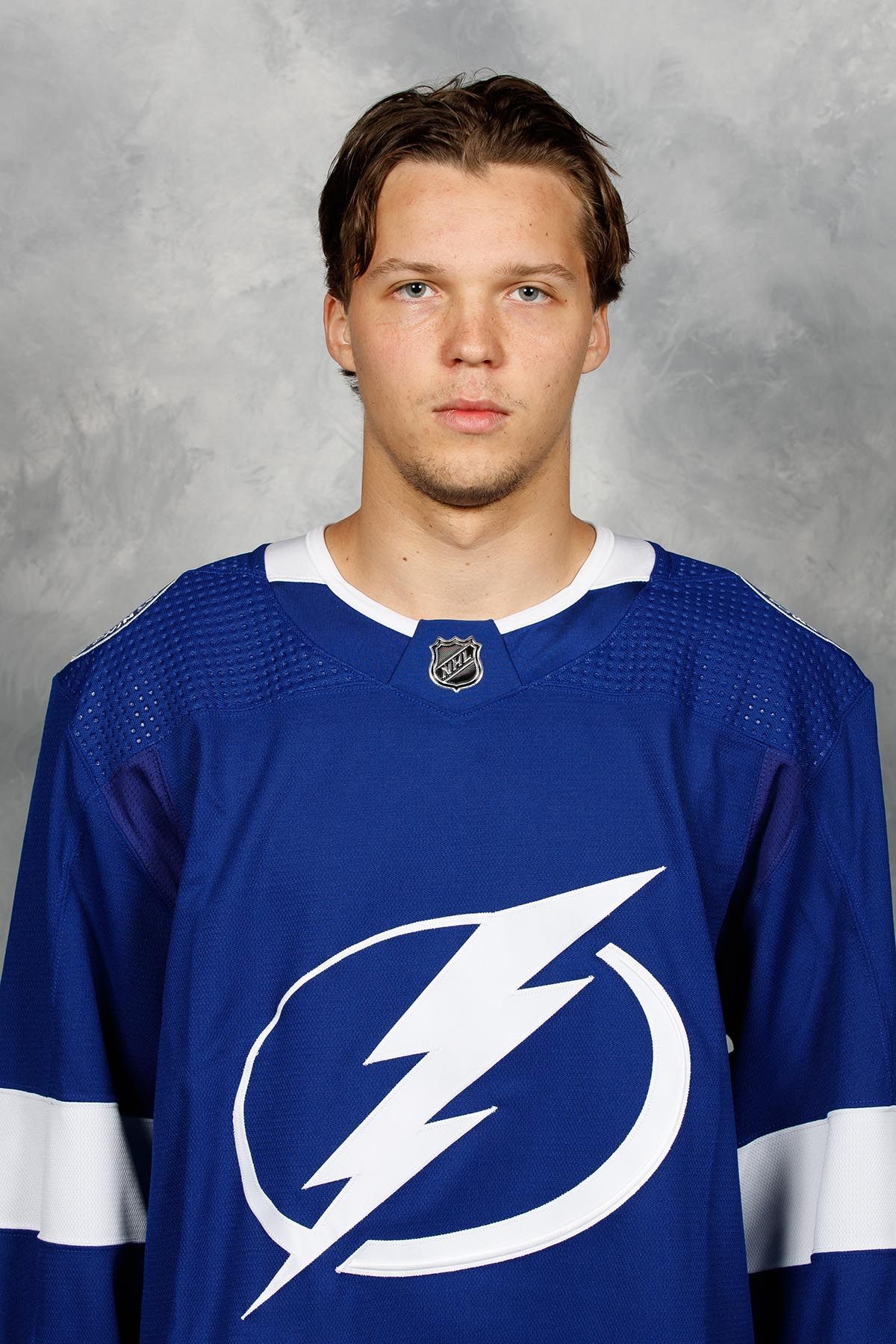
- Somppi with the Tampa Bay Lightning in 2021
- Born: 12 January 1998 (age 28) Helsinki, Finland
- Height: 6 ft 2 in (188 cm)
- Weight: 192 lb (87 kg; 13 st 10 lb)
- Position: Centre
- Shoots: Left
- Liiga team Former teams: Lukko; Syracuse Crunch; Lahti Pelicans
- NHL draft: 206th overall, 2016; Tampa Bay Lightning
- Playing career: 2018–present

Otto Somppi (born 12 January 1998) is a Finnish professional ice hockey forward for Lukko in the Liiga. He was drafted 206th overall by the Tampa Bay Lightning in the seventh round of the 2016 NHL entry draft.

== Playing career ==
=== Junior ===
Somppi played junior hockey for Jokerit in the U20 SM-sarja before getting drafted 18th overall by the Halifax Mooseheads of the Quebec Major Junior Hockey League (QMJHL) in the first round of the 2015 CHL Import Draft.

On 11 September 2015, Somppi made his QMJHL debut and scored first QMJHL goal in a three point effort against a 4–3 loss to the Charlottetown Islanders. Overall, he played 59 games with 13 goals and 33 assists in the 2015–16 QMJHL season and was selected to the CHL/NHL Top Prospects Game. The following season, he played 60 games with 17 goals and 24 assists. In his final QMJHL season, he was selected as alternate captain of the Halifax Mooseheads, making 28 goals and 55 assists in 59 games played.

=== Professional ===
After being drafted 206th overall by the Tampa Bay Lightning in the seventh round of the 2017 NHL entry draft, Somppi signed a three-year entry-level contract with the Lightning on 19 April 2018.

On 3 May 2018, Somppi made his professional debut for the Lightning's AHL affiliate, the Syracuse Crunch, in a 6–4 loss against the Toronto Marlies. He was reassigned to the Orlando Solar Bears in the ECHL after breaking his finger early in the 2018–19 season. On 12 December 2018, he scored his first AHL goal in a 8–1 win against the Marlies. In the 2019–20 AHL season, he appeared in 45 games with five goals and 13 assists. The following season, he was briefly loaned to the Lahti Pelicans in Liiga, appearing in nine games with one goal and two assists, before getting recalled to the Syracuse Crunch for the rest of the 2020–21 season, where he made 12 goals and 14 assists in 32 games.

On 27 July 2021, the Lightning signed Somppi to a one-year two-way contract extension.

Following the conclusion of the 2021–22 season with the Crunch, Somppi as an impending restricted free agent left the Lightning after five seasons within the organization and returned to the Finnish Liiga after agreeing to a one-year contract with Lukko on 6 June 2022.

== International play ==
Somppi represented Finland men's national under-17 ice hockey team at the 2014 World U-17 Hockey Challenge and at the 2015 European Youth Olympic Festival. He was selected to Finland men's national under-18 ice hockey team for the 2015 Ivan Hlinka Memorial Tournament and the 2016 IIHF World U18 Championships, winning a gold medal at the latter.

== Personal life ==
His favourite ice hockey player is Valtteri Filppula, a Finnish former NHL forward. His older brother, Juho, is also an ice hockey player.

== Career statistics ==
=== Regular season and playoffs ===
| | | | Regular season | | | | | Playoffs |
| Season | Team | League | GP | G | A | Pts | PIM | GP | G | A | Pts | PIM |
|---|---|---|---|---|---|---|---|---|---|---|---|---|
| 2014–15 | Jokerit | Jr. A | 38 | 6 | 7 | 13 | 10 | 2 | 0 | 0 | 0 | 0 |
| 2015–16 | Halifax Mooseheads | QMJHL | 59 | 13 | 33 | 46 | 25 | — | — | — | — | — |
| 2016–17 | Halifax Mooseheads | QMJHL | 60 | 17 | 24 | 41 | 30 | 4 | 0 | 1 | 1 | 2 |
| 2017–18 | Halifax Mooseheads | QMJHL | 59 | 28 | 55 | 83 | 28 | 2 | 0 | 1 | 1 | 0 |
| 2017–18 | Syracuse Crunch | AHL | — | — | — | — | — | 3 | 0 | 0 | 0 | 0 |
| 2018–19 | Syracuse Crunch | AHL | 27 | 2 | 2 | 4 | 10 | — | — | — | — | — |
| 2018–19 | Orlando Solar Bears | ECHL | 21 | 12 | 12 | 24 | 8 | 3 | 0 | 0 | 0 | 6 |
| 2019–20 | Syracuse Crunch | AHL | 45 | 5 | 13 | 18 | 24 | — | — | — | — | — |
| 2020–21 | Lahti Pelicans | Liiga | 9 | 1 | 2 | 3 | 0 | — | — | — | — | — |
| 2020–21 | Syracuse Crunch | AHL | 32 | 12 | 14 | 26 | 22 | — | — | — | — | — |
| 2021–22 | Syracuse Crunch | AHL | 50 | 5 | 18 | 23 | 14 | 3 | 0 | 0 | 0 | 0 |
| AHL totals | | | 154 | 24 | 47 | 71 | 70 | 6 | 0 | 0 | 0 | 0 |

=== International ===
| Year | Team | Event | Result | GP | G | A | Pts | PIM |
|---|---|---|---|---|---|---|---|---|
| 2014 | Finland | U17 | 4th | 6 | 3 | 3 | 6 | 2 |
| 2015 | Finland | IH18 | 4th | 5 | 1 | 2 | 3 | 14 |
| 2016 | Finland | U18 | 1st place, gold medalist(s) | 7 | 1 | 1 | 2 | 2 |
| Junior totals | | | | 18 | 5 | 6 | 11 | 18 |
