= Tyler Steenbergen =

Canadian former ice hockey player (born 1998)

- Born: January 7, 1998 (age 28) Sylvan Lake, Alberta, Canada
- Height: 5 ft 10 in (178 cm)
- Weight: 187 lb (85 kg; 13 st 5 lb)
- Position: Centre
- Shot: Right
- Played for: Tucson Roadrunners; HC TPS; HK Poprad; EC VSV
- NHL draft: 128th overall, 2017; Arizona Coyotes
- Playing career: 2018–2024

Tyler Steenbergen (born January 7, 1998) is a Canadian former professional ice hockey centre. Steenbergen was selected by the Arizona Coyotes of the National Hockey League (NHL) 128th overall in the 2017 NHL entry draft.

== Early life ==
He is from Sylvan Lake.

== Playing career ==
In 2014, he began his career with the Swift Current Broncos in the Western Hockey League. In 2017, he was one of the WHL's top scorers. He was selected in the 2017 NHL entry draft by the Arizona Coyotes in the 5th round, 128th overall. Starting with the 2018-2019 season, he played professional ice hockey with the Coyotes' American Hockey League affiliate, the Tucson Roadrunners. He played 156 games over three seasons for the Roadrunners. From 2021 to 2024, he played hockey in Europe. As of 2025, he has retired from professional hockey.

== International play ==
Medal record

Representing Canada

Men's ice hockey

World Junior Championships
Gold medal – first place	2018 Canada	

Steenbergen was named to the 2017 World Junior selection camp roster, but was not selected for the final roster. In 2018, he was selected to represent Canada for the 2018 World Junior team. He scored the winning goal in Team Canada's victory in the 2018 World Junior Championships. He was one of the members of the 2018 World Junior team called to testify in the 2025 criminal trial in which five of the other players from the team were charged with sexual assault.
