= Igor Shvyrev =

Russian ice hockey player (born 1998)

- Born: 10 July 1998 (age 28) Magnitogorsk, Russia
- Height: 6 ft 1 in (185 cm)
- Weight: 192 lb (87 kg; 13 st 10 lb)
- Position: Center
- Shoots: Left
- KHL team Former teams: Free agent Metallurg Magnitogorsk; Colorado Eagles; Spartak Moscow; HC Dynamo Pardubice; HC Sochi
- NHL draft: 125th overall, 2017; Colorado Avalanche
- Playing career: 2015–present

Igor Shvyrev (born 10 July 1998) is a Russian professional ice hockey forward who is currently an unrestricted free agent. He most recently played for HC Sochi of the Kontinental Hockey League (KHL). He was selected in the fifth round, 125th overall, by the Colorado Avalanche in the 2017 NHL entry draft.

== Playing career ==
Shvyrev as a native of Magnitogorsk, played as a junior within the ranks of Metallurg Magnitogorsk of the Kontinental Hockey League (KHL). He made his debut in the MHL with junior academy club, Stalnye Lisy Magnitogorsk in the 2014–15 season, scoring 8 points in 17 games as a 16-year-old.

Showing offensive potential, before the beginning of the MHL season, Shvyrev opened the 2015–16 season on Metallurg's KHL roster. He made his professional debut in the KHL as a 17-year-old, appearing in a 2–1 defeat to Avtomobilist Yekaterinburg, on 30 August 2015. Shryrev was then reassigned to join Stalnye Lisy for the duration of the season, posting 12 goals and 38 points in 44 games. Despite producing offensively with Stalnye Lisy, Shvyrev was passed over in the first year of his eligibility at the 2016 NHL entry draft.

Having signed a two-year contract with Metallurg Magnitogorsk, Shvyrev appeared in 10 games during the 2016–17 season, going scoreless while averaging under 2 minute's a game. Shvyrev however in continuing to split the campaign with the MHL, broke out offensively centering the top line in registering 21 goals and 49 assists for 70 points in just 40 games. Showing his scoring touch and two-way ability, Shvyrev gained attention of the NHL scouts and was selected in the fifth round, 125th overall, by the Colorado Avalanche in the 2017 NHL entry draft.

In his third season with Metallurg Magnitogorsk, Shvyrev scored his first career goal and point on the opening night of the 2017–18 season, in a 3–2 defeat to Amur Khabarovsk on 1 September 2017. Shvyrev remained in the KHL to appear in a career high 32 games. Despite continued limited ice time due to his youth, Shvyrev would not add to his opening night goal and continued to play junior, appearing in 10 games for 17 points. He made his post-season debut with Magnitogorsk appearing in 3 games before their second round exit to eventual Gagarin Cup champions, Ak Bars Kazan.

With his contract up for renewal with Magnitogorsk, Shvyrev opted to further his development in North America by agreeing to a three-year, entry-level contract with the Colorado Avalanche on 9 May 2018. After attending his first training camp with the Avalanche in 2018, Shvyrev was reassigned to AHL affiliate, the Colorado Eagles, for their inaugural 2018–19 season in the AHL. He made his North American debut and scored the game-tying goal to get the Eagles to overtime in their opening night defeat to the Chicago Wolves on 5 October 2018.

In his second season within the Avalanche organization, Shvyrev continued with the Colorado Eagles, however stagnated in his development in the 2019–20 season, limited to the fourth-line in posting 6 goals and 9 points in 49 games. On 28 May 2020, Shvyrev was placed on and cleared unconditional waivers, mutually terminating the final year of his entry-level contract with the Colorado Avalanche.

On 12 June 2020, having returned to his native Russia, Shvyrev agreed to re-join Metallurg Magnitogorsk of the KHL on a two-year contract. In his first full season in the KHL in 2020–21, Shvyrev played in a fourth line role, adding 3 goals and 8 points through 49 regular season games.

In the following 2021–22 season, Shvyrev was limited to just four scoreless games before his tenure with Magnitogorsk ended after he was traded to fellow KHL club HC Spartak Moscow. He made 17 further appearances in the KHL registering just 3 assists before he opted to leave Russia mid-season and join Czech club, HC Dynamo Pardubice of the Czech Extraliga, on 2 January 2022. He made just 7 appearances with Pardubice, before he left the club at the conclusion of the season.

Remaining without a club mid-way into the 2022–23 season, Shvyrev belatedly signed a contract with Russian VHL club, HC Tambov, on 31 December 2022. Shvyrev enjoyed a return to offensive production in finishing the season with 17 points through 15 games.

On 5 July 2023, with his contract rights still held by Spartak, Shvyrev was traded to VHL club, HC Yugra in exchange for a prospect and monetary compensation. He was signed to a one-year contract for the 2023–24 season. In his tenure with Yugra, Shvyrev broke out offensively, leading the team and the VHL in regular season scoring with 56 points through 51 games.

As a free agent, Shvyrev on the back of a successful season returned to the KHL by signing to a two-year contract with HC Sochi on 2 May 2024.

Limited to 17 games in the final season under contract with Sochi, Shyyrev left as a free agent in the off-season. He was signed on a try-out basis with HC Lada Togliatti on 2 July 2026 however was later released without a contract prior to the 2026–27 season on 21 August 2026.

== International play ==
Medal record

Representing Russia

Ice hockey

Ivan Hlinka Memorial Tournament
| Bronze medal – third place | 2015 Canada | |

Shvyrev represented Russia at the junior level in the 2015 Ivan Hlinka Memorial Tournament. He produced 1 assist in 5 games in helping Russia claim the Bronze medal.

== Career statistics ==
=== Regular season and playoffs ===
| | | | Regular season | | | | | Playoffs |
| Season | Team | League | GP | G | A | Pts | PIM | GP | G | A | Pts | PIM |
|---|---|---|---|---|---|---|---|---|---|---|---|---|
| 2014–15 | Stalnye Lisy Magnitogorsk | MHL | 19 | 1 | 7 | 8 | 2 | 5 | 0 | 1 | 1 | 0 |
| 2015–16 | Metallurg Magnitogorsk | KHL | 1 | 0 | 0 | 0 | 0 | — | — | — | — | — |
| 2015–16 | Stalnye Lisy Magnitogorsk | MHL | 44 | 12 | 26 | 38 | 40 | 8 | 1 | 4 | 5 | 4 |
| 2016–17 | Stalnye Lisy Magnitogorsk | MHL | 40 | 21 | 49 | 70 | 26 | 5 | 2 | 1 | 3 | 4 |
| 2016–17 | Metallurg Magnitogorsk | KHL | 10 | 0 | 0 | 0 | 2 | — | — | — | — | — |
| 2017–18 | Metallurg Magnitogorsk | KHL | 32 | 1 | 0 | 1 | 4 | 3 | 0 | 0 | 0 | 0 |
| 2017–18 | Stalnye Lisy Magnitogorsk | MHL | 10 | 5 | 12 | 17 | 24 | 2 | 1 | 2 | 3 | 27 |
| 2018–19 | Colorado Eagles | AHL | 57 | 6 | 7 | 13 | 25 | — | — | — | — | — |
| 2019–20 | Colorado Eagles | AHL | 49 | 6 | 3 | 9 | 12 | — | — | — | — | — |
| 2020–21 | Metallurg Magnitogorsk | KHL | 49 | 3 | 5 | 8 | 20 | 1 | 0 | 0 | 0 | 0 |
| 2021–22 | Metallurg Magnitogorsk | KHL | 4 | 0 | 0 | 0 | 0 | — | — | — | — | — |
| 2021–22 | Spartak Moscow | KHL | 17 | 0 | 3 | 3 | 6 | — | — | — | — | — |
| 2021–22 | HC Dynamo Pardubice | ELH | 7 | 0 | 1 | 1 | 0 | — | — | — | — | — |
| 2022–23 | HC Tambov | VHL | 15 | 5 | 12 | 17 | 12 | 6 | 0 | 0 | 0 | 2 |
| 2023–24 | HC Yugra | VHL | 54 | 25 | 31 | 56 | 56 | 19 | 6 | 3 | 9 | 14 |
| 2024–25 | HC Sochi | KHL | 54 | 6 | 4 | 10 | 30 | — | — | — | — | — |
| 2025–26 | HC Sochi | KHL | 17 | 0 | 1 | 1 | 4 | — | — | — | — | — |
| KHL totals | | | 184 | 10 | 13 | 23 | 66 | 4 | 0 | 0 | 0 | 0 |

=== International ===
| Year | Team | Event | Result | GP | G | A | Pts | PIM |
|---|---|---|---|---|---|---|---|---|
| 2015 | Russia | IH18 | 3rd place, bronze medalist(s) | 5 | 0 | 1 | 1 | 4 |
| Junior totals | | | | 5 | 0 | 1 | 1 | 4 |

== Awards and honours ==
| Award | Year |
|---|---|
MHL
| Rookie of the Month (February) | 2016 |
VHL
| Most Points (56) | 2024 |
