= Tyler Benson =

Canadian ice hockey player (born 1998)

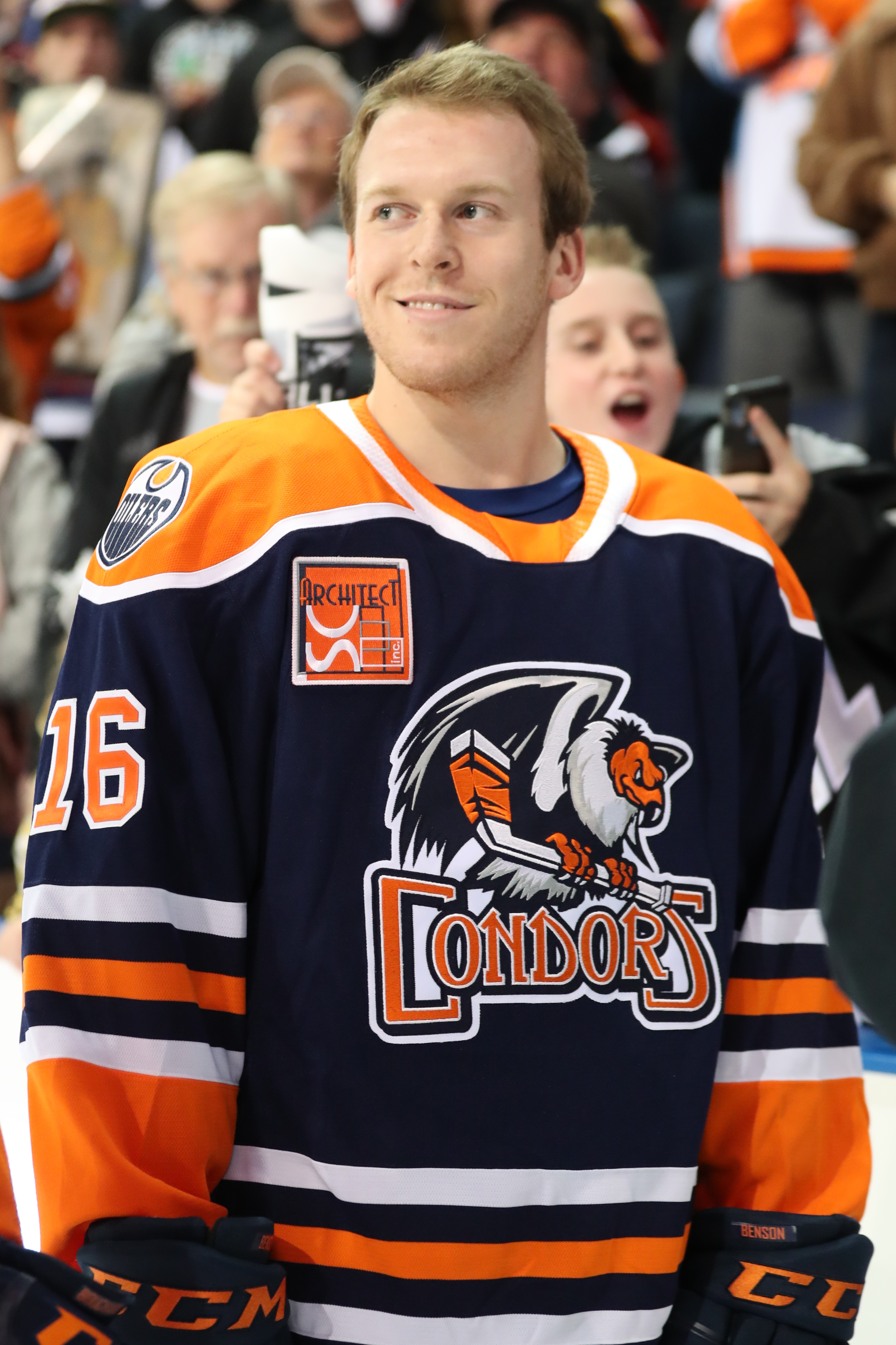
- Benson with the Bakersfield Condors in 2020
- Born: March 15, 1998 (age 28) Edmonton, Alberta, Canada
- Height: 5 ft 11 in (180 cm)
- Weight: 190 lb (86 kg; 13 st 8 lb)
- Position: Left wing
- Shoots: Left
- DEL2 team Former teams: EC Kassel Huskies; Edmonton Oilers; MoDo Hockey
- NHL draft: 32nd overall, 2016; Edmonton Oilers
- Playing career: 2018–present

Tyler Benson (born March 15, 1998) is a Canadian professional ice hockey forward who is currently under contract with EC Kassel Huskies in the DEL2. He previously played with the Edmonton Oilers of the National Hockey League (NHL).

== Playing career ==
Benson was born and raised in Edmonton, and played minor hockey at the South Side Athletic Club (SSAC), including overlapping seasons on the SSAC Lions of the Alberta Major Bantam Hockey League (AMBHL) with future Edmonton Oilers teammates Stuart Skinner (two SSAC seasons) and James Hamblin (one SSAC season). During the 2012–13 season he established a new scoring record with 146 points in 33 games, surpassing the previous AMBHL mark of 131 points held by Ty Rattie. In addition to being the league's top scorer, he was also named the AMBHL North's Most Valuable Player for the 2012–13 season.

Benson was selected first overall by the Vancouver Giants in the 2013 WHL Bantam Draft. He made his WHL debut, as an underaged player, on November 16, 2013, starting a WHL career that ran from 2013 to 2018.

Benson was selected by the Edmonton Oilers in the second round of the 2016 NHL Entry Draft, 32nd overall, and signed an entry-level contract on December 30, 2016. He turned pro in the 2018–19 season, playing with the Bakersfield Condors of the American Hockey League. Benson was named to the AHL All-Rookie and Second All-Star teams in the 2018–19 season, and played in the 2019–20 season All-Star game.

As a free agent from the Oilers following the 2022–23 season, Benson was unable to attract NHL interest. On July 10, 2023, he was signed to a one-year AHL contract with the Henderson Silver Knights, the primary affiliate to the Vegas Golden Knights.

Leading into the 2024–25 season, Benson remained an un-signed free agent before opting to sign a one-year deal with Swedish club, MoDo Hockey of the Swedish Hockey League SHL, on November 8, 2024. Through 31 regular season appearances, Benson went scoreless in the SHL, and was unable to help prevent MoDo from relegation to the second tier HockeyAllsvenskan.

Leaving Sweden as a free agent, Benson was signed to a one-year contract with EC Kassel Huskies of the DEL2 on May 31, 2025.

== Career statistics ==
=== Regular season and playoffs ===
| | | | Regular season | | | | | Playoffs |
| Season | Team | League | GP | G | A | Pts | PIM | GP | G | A | Pts | PIM |
|---|---|---|---|---|---|---|---|---|---|---|---|---|
| 2011–12 | SSAC Lions Bantam | AMBHL | 33 | 34 | 50 | 84 | 44 | 11 | 12 | 19 | 31 | 4 |
| 2012–13 | SSAC Lions Bantam | AMBHL | 33 | 57 | 89 | 146 | 52 | 11 | 15 | 22 | 37 | 16 |
| 2013–14 | Vancouver Giants | WHL | 7 | 0 | 0 | 0 | 0 | — | — | — | — | — |
| 2014–15 | Vancouver Giants | WHL | 62 | 14 | 31 | 45 | 55 | — | — | — | — | — |
| 2015–16 | Vancouver Giants | WHL | 30 | 9 | 19 | 28 | 46 | — | — | — | — | — |
| 2016–17 | Vancouver Giants | WHL | 33 | 11 | 31 | 42 | 31 | — | — | — | — | — |
| 2017–18 | Vancouver Giants | WHL | 58 | 27 | 42 | 69 | 39 | 7 | 3 | 8 | 11 | 10 |
| 2017–18 | Bakersfield Condors | AHL | 5 | 0 | 3 | 3 | 0 | — | — | — | — | — |
| 2018–19 | Bakersfield Condors | AHL | 68 | 15 | 51 | 66 | 44 | 10 | 1 | 6 | 7 | 10 |
| 2019–20 | Bakersfield Condors | AHL | 47 | 9 | 27 | 36 | 34 | — | — | — | — | — |
| 2019–20 | Edmonton Oilers | NHL | 7 | 0 | 1 | 1 | 0 | — | — | — | — | — |
| 2020–21 | GCK Lions | SL | 15 | 2 | 17 | 19 | 20 | — | — | — | — | — |
| 2020–21 | Bakersfield Condors | AHL | 36 | 10 | 26 | 36 | 30 | 6 | 3 | 2 | 5 | 4 |
| 2021–22 | Edmonton Oilers | NHL | 29 | 1 | 1 | 2 | 18 | — | — | — | — | — |
| 2021–22 | Bakersfield Condors | AHL | 18 | 4 | 8 | 12 | 8 | 1 | 0 | 0 | 0 | 0 |
| 2022–23 | Bakersfield Condors | AHL | 43 | 5 | 18 | 23 | 29 | 1 | 0 | 0 | 0 | 0 |
| 2022–23 | Edmonton Oilers | NHL | 2 | 0 | 0 | 0 | 0 | — | — | — | — | — |
| 2023–24 | Henderson Silver Knights | AHL | 52 | 5 | 20 | 25 | 12 | — | — | — | — | — |
| 2024–25 | MoDo Hockey | SHL | 31 | 0 | 0 | 0 | 25 | — | — | — | — | — |
| NHL totals | | | 38 | 1 | 2 | 3 | 18 | — | — | — | — | — |
| SHL totals | | | 31 | 0 | 0 | 0 | 25 | — | — | — | — | — |

=== International ===
| Year | Team | Event | Result | GP | G | A | Pts | PIM |
|---|---|---|---|---|---|---|---|---|
| 2014 | Canada Pacific | U17 | 2nd place, silver medalist(s) | 6 | 1 | 0 | 1 | 2 |
| 2014 | Canada Black | U17 | 7th | 5 | 1 | 1 | 2 | 4 |
| 2015 | Canada | U18 | 3rd place, bronze medalist(s) | 7 | 1 | 3 | 4 | 8 |
| 2015 | Canada | IH18 | 1st place, gold medalist(s) | 4 | 1 | 4 | 5 | 4 |
| Junior totals | | | | 7 | 1 | 3 | 4 | 8 |

== Awards and honours ==
| Award | Year |
AMBHL
| Rookie of the Year | 2011–12 |
| Most Valuable Player | 2012–13 |
WHL
| WHL Bantam Draft First Overall Selection | 2013 |
| CHL Top Prospects Game | 2016 |
AHL
| All-Rookie Team | 2019 |
| Second all-star team | 2019 |
| All-Star Game | 2020 |
