= Vystrkov =

- Municipality
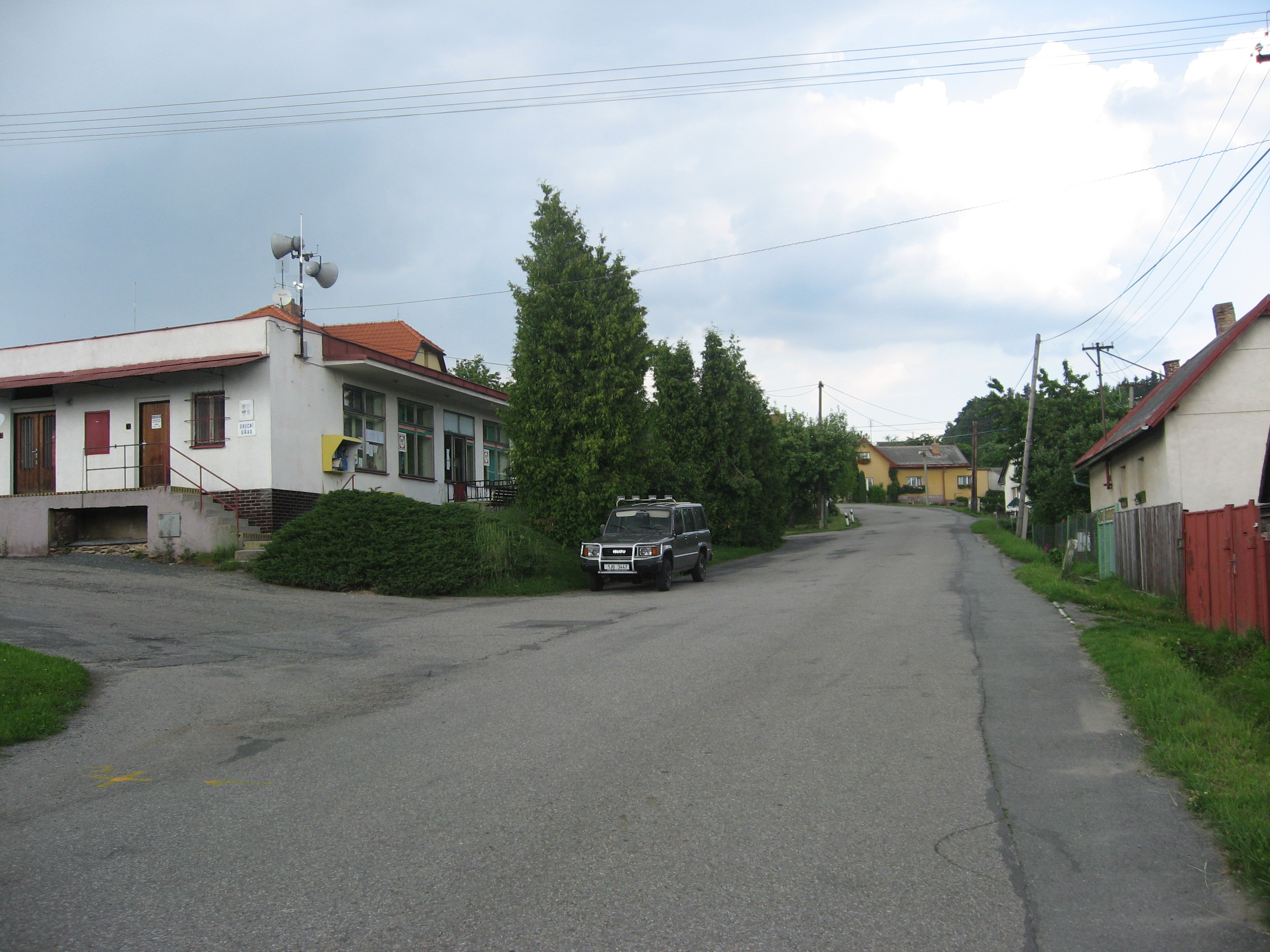
- Centre of Vystrkov

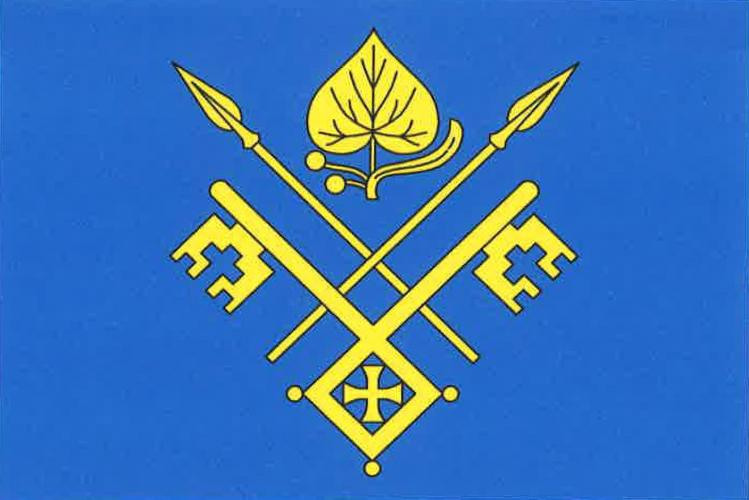
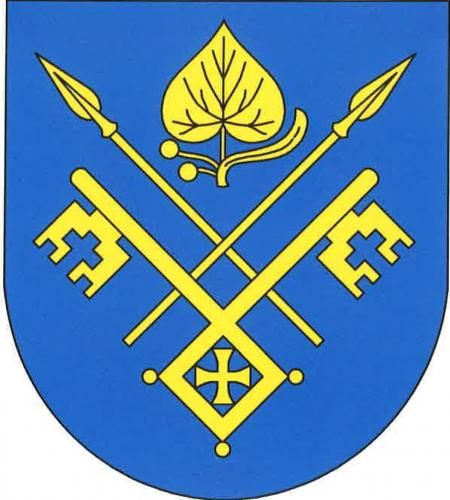
- Flag Coat of arms

- Location in the Czech Republic
- Coordinates: 49°31′11″N 15°20′56″E
- Country: Czech Republic
- Region: Vysočina
- District: Pelhřimov
- First mentioned: 1599

Area
  - Total: 2.24 km^{2} (0.86 sq mi)
- Elevation: 580 m (1,900 ft)

Population (2026-01-01)
  - Total: 271
  - Density: 121/km^{2} (313/sq mi)
- Time zone: UTC+1 (CET)
  - Summer (DST): UTC+2 (CEST)
- Postal code: 396 01
- Website: www.obecvystrkov.cz

Vystrkov is a municipality and village in Pelhřimov District in the Vysočina Region of the Czech Republic. It has about 300 inhabitants.

Vystrkov lies approximately 14 kilometres (9 mi) north-east of Pelhřimov, 23 kilometres (14 mi) north-west of Jihlava, and 92 kilometres (57 mi) south-east of Prague.

== Demographics ==
Historical population
Year	Pop.	±%
1869	208	—
1880	203	−2.4%
1890	245	+20.7%
1900	258	+5.3%
1910	263	+1.9%
1921	223	−15.2%
1930	218	−2.2%
1950	327	+50.0%
1961	188	−42.5%
1970	177	−5.9%
1980	183	+3.4%
1991	185	+1.1%
2001	193	+4.3%
2011	234	+21.2%
2021	277	+18.4%
Source: Censuses

== Notable people ==
- Josef Kořenář (born 1998), ice hockey player
