= Artur Kayumov =

Russian ice hockey player

- Born: 14 February 1998 (age 28) Podgorny, Russia
- Height: 5 ft 11 in (180 cm)
- Weight: 176 lb (80 kg; 12 st 8 lb)
- Position: Forward
- Shoots: Left
- KHL team: Lokomotiv Yaroslavl
- National team: Russia
- NHL draft: 50th overall, 2016; Chicago Blackhawks
- Playing career: 2016–present

Artur Adisovich Kayumov (Russian: Артур Адисович Каюмов, born 14 February 1998) is a Russian professional ice hockey forward for Lokomotiv Yaroslavl of the Kontinental Hockey League.

== Playing career ==
He was picked by the Chicago Blackhawks 50th overall in the 2016 NHL entry draft.

During the 2018–19 season, while playing in his first full season with Lokomotiv, Kayumov was suspended by the KHL for 13 games for illegally delivering a check to the head of Jokerit's Jesper Jensen and then inadvertently punching a referee in the face.

== International play ==
Medal record

Ice hockey

Representing ROC

Olympic Games
Silver medal – second place	2022 Beijing	

On 23 January 2022, Kayumov was named to the roster to represent Russian Olympic Committee athletes at the 2022 Winter Olympics.

== Career statistics ==
=== Regular season and playoffs ===
			Regular season					Playoffs
Season	Team	League	GP	G	A	Pts	PIM	GP	G	A	Pts	PIM
2014–15	Loko Yaroslavl	RUS U17	19	11	15	26	35	—	—	—	—	—
2014–15	Loko Yaroslavl	MHL	14	1	4	5	25	2	0	0	0	2
2014–15	Loko Junior Yaroslavl	MHL B	32	16	18	34	4	8	1	2	3	2
2015–16	Team Russia U18	MHL	39	12	19	31	12	3	0	1	1	25
2016–17	Loko Yaroslavl	MHL	33	8	11	19	43	3	1	1	2	4
2016–17	Lokomotiv Yaroslavl	KHL	4	0	0	0	0	—	—	—	—	—
2016–17	HC Ryazan	VHL	12	1	6	7	8	4	0	0	0	4
2017–18	Loko Yaroslavl	MHL	4	1	0	1	8	9	1	1	2	6
2017–18	Lokomotiv Yaroslavl	KHL	20	2	1	3	2	5	1	0	1	2
2018–19	Lokomotiv Yaroslavl	KHL	46	5	8	13	59	11	2	4	6	2
2019–20	Lokomotiv Yaroslavl	KHL	60	16	9	25	18	6	2	0	2	2
2020–21	Lokomotiv Yaroslavl	KHL	57	12	17	29	18	11	0	2	2	9
2021–22	Lokomotiv Yaroslavl	KHL	42	10	9	19	10	4	0	3	3	0
2022–23	Lokomotiv Yaroslavl	KHL	53	12	22	34	20	12	1	4	5	2
2023–24	Lokomotiv Yaroslavl	KHL	66	16	19	35	21	20	4	10	14	6
2024–25	Lokomotiv Yaroslavl	KHL	63	22	23	45	14	21	5	7	12	2
2025–26	Lokomotiv Yaroslavl	KHL	58	14	29	43	18	22	5	6	11	4
KHL totals			469	109	137	246	180	112	20	36	56	29

=== International ===
Year	Team	Event	Result	GP	G	A	Pts	PIM
2015	Russia	IH18	3rd place, bronze medalist(s)	5	2	4	6	0
2018	Russia	WJC	5th	5	3	2	5	0
2022	ROC	OG	2nd place, silver medalist(s)	4	0	0	0	0
Junior totals				10	5	6	11	0
Senior totals				4	0	0	0	0

== Awards and honors ==
Award	Year
KHL
Gagarin Cup champion	2025, 2026
