= Tomáš Hedera =

Slovak ice hockey defenceman

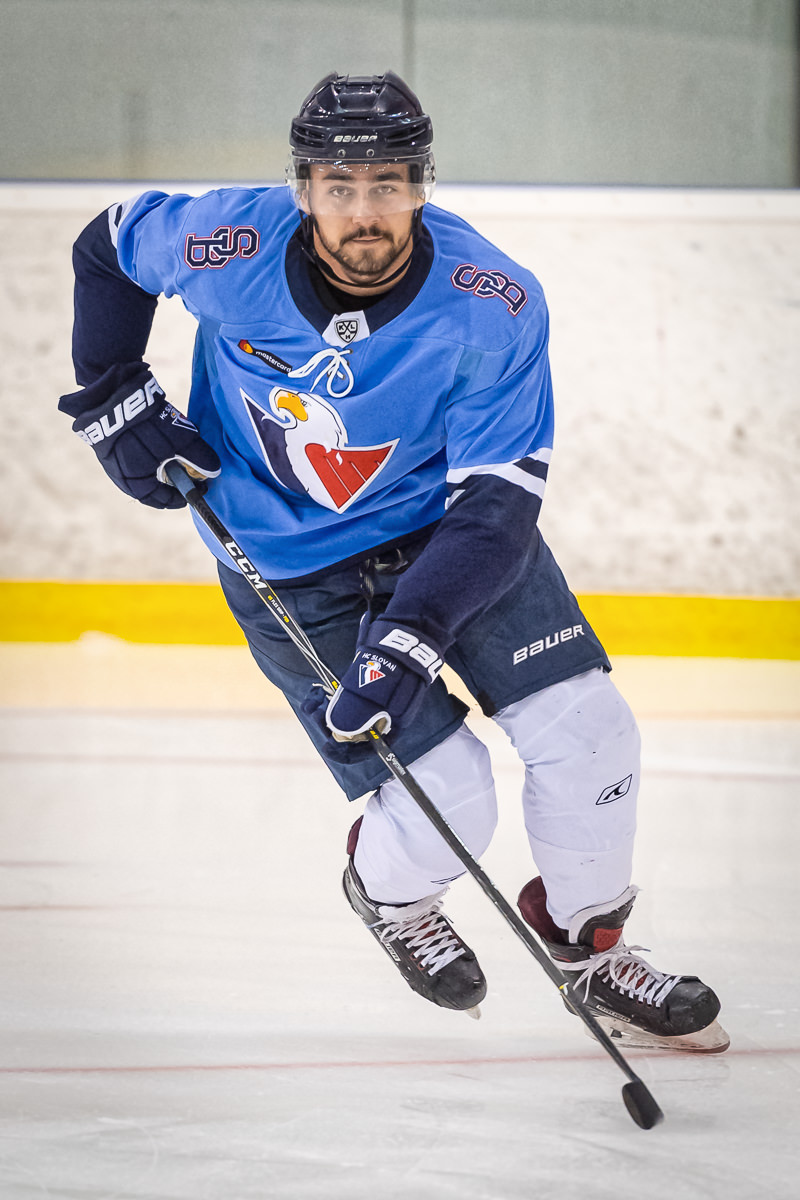
- Born: November 7, 1998 (age 26); Bratislava, Slovakia
- Height: 6 ft 1 in (185 cm)
- Weight: 190 lb (86 kg; 13 st 8 lb)
- Position: Defence
- Shoots: Left
- Slovak team Former teams: HC Nové Zámky; HC Slovan Bratislava
- National team: Slovakia
- Playing career: 2016–present

Tomáš Hedera (born November 7, 1998) is a Slovak professional ice hockey defenceman currently playing for HC Nové Zámky of the Tipsport Liga.

Hedera previously played 14 games in the Kontinental Hockey League for HC Slovan Bratislava. He represented Slovakia at the 2018 World Junior Ice Hockey Championships.
