= Kristian Reichel =

Czech ice hockey player (born 1998)

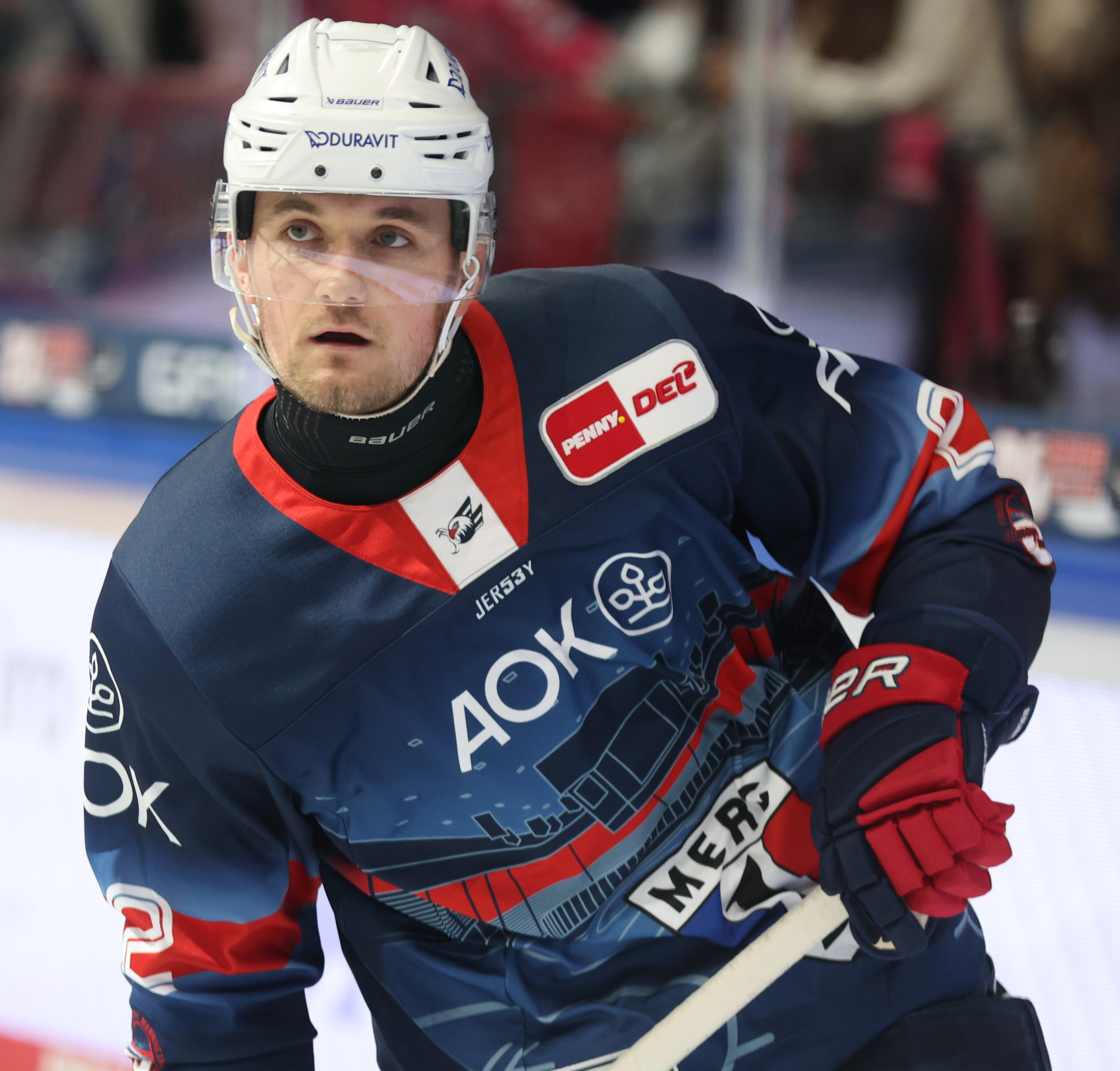
- Kristian Reichel, 2024
- Born: 11 June 1998 (age 28) Most, Czech Republic
- Height: 6 ft 1 in (185 cm)
- Weight: 192 lb (87 kg; 13 st 10 lb)
- Position: Center
- Shoots: Right
- DEL team Former teams: Adler Mannheim; HC Litvínov; Winnipeg Jets
- NHL draft: Undrafted
- Playing career: 2015–present

Kristian Reichel (born 11 June 1998) is a Czech professional ice hockey forward who currently plays for Adler Mannheim in the Deutsche Eishockey Liga (DEL).

== Playing career ==
Reichel played as a youth within HC Litvínov organization. He made his professional debut in the 2015–16 season with Litvínov in the Czech Extraliga (ELH). He was selected 27th overall in the 2017 CHL Import Draft by the Red Deer Rebels of the Western Hockey League (WHL).

In his only season of major junior with the Rebels in 2017–18, Reichel placed third in team scoring with 57 points through 63 regular season games. As an undrafted free agent, Reichel was signed to a one-year AHL contract with the Manitoba Moose, primary affiliate to the Winnipeg Jets, on 3 July 2018.

Making his North American professional debut in the 2018–19 season, Reichel registered 2 goals and 10 points in 55 games for the Moose.

Following a second full year with the Moose, posting 12 goals and 17 points through 37 regular season games, Reichel was signed by NHL affiliate, the Winnipeg Jets, to a two-year, entry-level contract on 16 June 2020.

On 6 May 2024, Reichel signed a three-year contract to play for Adler Mannheim in the DEL.

== International play ==
Reichel first represented the Czech Republic at the 2015 Ivan Hlinka Memorial Tournament.

Reichel made two appearances at the World Junior Championships, going scoreless in the 2017 World Junior Championships before collecting 3 goals and 4 points in 7 games at the following 2018 World Junior Championships in Buffalo, New York, en route to a fourth-place finish at the tournament.

== Personal ==
Kristian's father is Robert Reichel, Olympic winner and Czech Ice Hockey Hall of Fame inductee. His uncle, Martin Reichel also played professionally in Europe along with his cousin, Thomas Reichel. His other cousin Lukas Reichel, also plays professionally.

== Career statistics ==
=== Regular season and playoffs ===
			Regular season					Playoffs
Season	Team	League	GP	G	A	Pts	PIM	GP	G	A	Pts	PIM
2014–15	HC Litvínov	Czech.20	4	1	0	1	0	—	—	—	—	—
2015–16	HC Litvínov	Czech.20	28	17	7	24	16	—	—	—	—	—
2015–16	HC Litvínov	ELH	15	3	1	4	4	—	—	—	—	—
2016–17	HC Litvínov	ELH	41	2	6	8	8	5	0	0	0	0
2016–17	HC Most	Czech.1	3	2	1	3	0	—	—	—	—	—
2017–18	Red Deer Rebels	WHL	63	34	23	57	32	5	3	2	5	2
2018–19	Manitoba Moose	AHL	55	2	8	10	14	—	—	—	—	—
2019–20	Manitoba Moose	AHL	39	12	5	17	18	—	—	—	—	—
2020–21	Manitoba Moose	AHL	29	6	6	12	8	—	—	—	—	—
2021–22	Manitoba Moose	AHL	30	5	8	13	12	—	—	—	—	—
2021–22	Winnipeg Jets	NHL	13	1	1	2	7	—	—	—	—	—
2022–23	Manitoba Moose	AHL	61	9	15	24	28	—	—	—	—	—
2022–23	Winnipeg Jets	NHL	2	0	1	1	0	—	—	—	—	—
2023–24	Manitoba Moose	AHL	70	23	19	42	38	2	0	0	0	0
2024–25	Adler Mannheim	DEL	51	17	19	36	34	10	3	0	3	8
ELH totals			56	5	7	12	12	5	0	0	0	0
NHL totals			15	1	2	3	7	—	—	—	—	—

=== International ===
Year	Team	Event	Result	GP	G	A	Pts	PIM
2015	Czech Republic	IH18	6th	4	1	2	3	0
2016	Czech Republic	U18	7th	5	0	3	3	0
2017	Czech Republic	WJC	6th	5	0	0	0	0
2018	Czech Republic	WJC	4th	7	3	1	4	4
Junior totals				21	4	6	10	4
