= Robin Salo =

Finnish ice hockey player

- Born: 13 October 1998 (age 27) Espoo, Finland
- Height: 185 cm (6 ft 1 in)
- Weight: 86.6 kg (191 lb; 13 st 9 lb)
- Position: Defence
- Shoots: Left
- SHL team Former teams: Malmö Redhawks; Vaasan Sport; SaiPa; Örebro HK; New York Islanders
- National team: Finland
- NHL draft: 46th overall, 2017; New York Islanders
- Playing career: 2015–present

Robin Christian Salo (born 13 October 1998) is a Finnish professional ice hockey defenceman for the Malmö Redhawks of the Swedish Hockey League (SHL).

== Playing career ==
He was selected by the New York Islanders in the second round, 46th overall, of the 2017 NHL entry draft.

On 26 February 2015, at the age of 16, Salo made his Liiga debut playing with Vaasan Sport during the 2014–15 season.

Following the 2017–18 season, after three Liiga campaigns with Vaasan Sport, Salo left at the conclusion of his contract to sign a two-year deal with fellow Liiga outfit, SaiPa, on 13 April 2018.

In the midst of the 2020–21 season, while leading the Swedish club, Örebro HK of the Swedish Hockey League (SHL), in assists and scoring from the blueline, Salo was signed to a two-year, entry-level contract with the New York Islanders on 13 February 2021. He was reassigned to continue his tenure with Örebro HK for the remainder of the season.

In the 2021–22 season, Salo was recalled from AHL affiliate, the Bridgeport Islanders and made his NHL debut with New York on 20 November 2021, which coincidentally was also the first ever game played at UBS Arena. He recorded his first NHL point, a primary assist on a second period power play goal, on 16 December in a home game against the Boston Bruins. Salo later scored his first NHL goal on 18 January 2022, against the Philadelphia Flyers.

On 14 June 2024, Salo signed a two-year contract with the Malmö Redhawks of the SHL.

== Career statistics ==
=== Regular season and playoffs ===
			Regular season					Playoffs
Season	Team	League	GP	G	A	Pts	PIM	GP	G	A	Pts	PIM
2014–15	Vaasan Sport	Jr. A	45	10	16	26	32	—	—	—	—	—
2014–15	Vaasan Sport	Liiga	4	0	0	0	0	—	—	—	—	—
2015–16	Vaasan Sport	Jr. A	27	10	7	17	8	—	—	—	—	—
2015–16	Vaasan Sport	Liiga	16	0	0	0	0	—	—	—	—	—
2015–16	Hermes	Mestis	7	1	0	1	18	—	—	—	—	—
2016–17	Vaasan Sport	Liiga	54	1	15	16	14	—	—	—	—	—
2017–18	Vaasan Sport	Liiga	43	0	5	5	14	—	—	—	—	—
2017–18	Hermes	Mestis	2	0	0	0	2	—	—	—	—	—
2018–19	SaiPa	Liiga	57	4	12	16	20	3	2	0	2	0
2019–20	SaiPa	Liiga	46	8	13	21	14	—	—	—	—	—
2019–20	Örebro HK	SHL	12	1	5	6	2	—	—	—	—	—
2020–21	Örebro HK	SHL	51	6	24	30	16	9	0	4	4	0
2021–22	Bridgeport Islanders	AHL	40	4	16	20	8	6	1	1	2	2
2021–22	New York Islanders	NHL	21	1	4	5	4	—	—	—	—	—
2022–23	New York Islanders	NHL	11	2	2	4	4	—	—	—	—	—
2022–23	Bridgeport Islanders	AHL	38	0	14	14	26	—	—	—	—	—
2023–24	Bridgeport Islanders	AHL	68	5	19	24	22	—	—	—	—	—
2024–25	Malmö Redhawks	SHL	52	5	21	26	10	8	1	3	4	0
Liiga totals			220	13	45	58	62	3	2	0	2	0
SHL totals			115	12	50	62	28	17	1	7	8	0
NHL totals			32	3	6	9	8	—	—	—	—	—

Medal record

Representing Finland

Ice hockey

IIHF World U18 Championship
Gold medal – first place	2016 United States	
Silver medal – second place	2015 Switzerland	

=== International ===
Year	Team	Event	Result	GP	G	A	Pts	PIM
2014	Finland	U17	4th	6	0	0	0	0
2015	Finland	U18	2nd place, silver medalist(s)	7	0	0	0	0
2015	Finland	IH18	4th	5	2	0	2	2
2016	Finland	U18	1st place, gold medalist(s)	7	1	0	1	2
2018	Finland	WJC	6th	5	0	0	0	0
2025	Finland	WC	7th	5	0	2	2	0
Junior totals				30	3	0	3	4
Senior totals				5	0	2	2	0
