= Mikhail Meshcheryakov =

Mikhail Mikhailovich Meshcheryakov
- Born: 20 November [O.S. 8 November] 1896; Taganrog, Don Host Oblast, Russian Empire
- Died: 13 May 1970 (aged 73); Moscow, Russian SFSR, Soviet Union
- Burial place: Vagankovo Cemetery
- Military career
- Allegiance: Russian Empire; Soviet Union
- Branch: Imperial Russian Army; Red Army (later Soviet Army)
- Service years: 1915–1917; 1918–1925; 1941–1958
- Rank: Major general
- Commands: 136th Rifle Division
- Conflicts: World War I; Russian Civil War; World War II
- Awards: Hero of the Soviet Union; Order of Lenin; Order of the Red Banner (4); Order of Alexander Nevsky; Order of the Red Star; Cross of St. George, 1st, 2nd, 3rd, and 4th class; Legion of Merit

Mikhail Mikhailovich Meshcheryakov (Russian: Михаил Михайлович Мещеряков; 20 November [O.S. 8 November] 1896 – 13 May 1970) was a Red Army major general and Hero of the Soviet Union.

Drafted into the Imperial Russian Army in World War I, Meshcheryakov became a non-commissioned officer and was decorated for his actions. He became a machine gun instructor in 1917 and joined the Red Army, fighting in the Russian Civil War. Demobilized in the mid-1920s, Meshcheryakov was a worker and a teacher during the interwar period. He was called up again and became a Red Army officer after Operation Barbarossa, the German invasion of the Soviet Union. He led a battalion and a regiment, and took command of the 136th Rifle Division in June 1944. Meshcheryakov was awarded the title Hero of the Soviet Union for his leadership of the 136th Rifle Division during the Lvov–Sandomierz Offensive that summer. He became a deputy division and deputy corps commander in 1945. Postwar, after a stint as a Soviet adviser in Mongolia, he became chief of a military school before retiring in 1958.

== Early life and World War I ==
Meshcheryakov was born in Taganrog on 20 November [O.S. 8 November] 1896 to a working-class family. He graduated from the parish school in 1907, and became an apprentice saddler. After the beginning of World War I, Meshcheryakov was mobilized into the Imperial Russian Army in October 1915. He graduated from the Oranienbaum Machine Gun Crew and the School of Machine Gun Instructors, becoming a senior unteroffizier. After completing his training in January 1916, he was sent to the front as a platoon commander in the 138th Infantry Division's 550th Igumen Infantry Regiment, part of the 37th Army Corps in the Northern Front's 5th Army, reaching the rank of Podpraporshchik. Meshcheryakov was awarded the Cross of St. George four times, making him a Full Cavalier of St. George. He was wounded three times in combat, and treated in a hospital from November 1916 until January 1917. Meshcheryakov was sent to the 1st Reserve Machine Gun Regiment in Oranienbaum in January. He participated in the February Revolution as well as the July Days and became a member of the regimental committee. After the regiment was disbanded in July, Meshcheryakov was sent back to his old unit, the 138th Division, still on the front. He successively served as chairman of company, battalion, regimental, divisional, and corps committees. In October he became commissar of the 37th Army Corps.

== Russian Civil War ==
Meshcheryakov joined the Red Army in March 1918 after a Red Guard detachment was formed from former soldiers of the Imperial Army. Between April and August, he was assistant commander of a machine gun company in the Communist Special Purpose Regiment after the detachment was merged. In July, Meshcheryakov participated in the suppression of the Left SR uprising in Moscow. Between 1918 and 1919, he was a machine gun instructor at the 3rd Moscow Command Courses, staffed by former non-commissioned officers of the Imperial Army. In 1919, Meshcheryakov fought in the Defense of Petrograd with the Consolidated Moscow Cadet Brigade against White general Nikolai Yudenich, and in the elimination of Lieutenant General Viktor Pokrovsky's White partisans in the Caucasus in early 1920, after the courses were relocated to Maykop.

== Interwar period ==
Between 1920 and 1923, Meshcheryakov served as a machine gun crew and platoon commander in the Maykop Command Staff Courses. In 1923, he was a quartermaster of the North Caucasus Military District Repeated Courses for Commanders in Rostov-on-Don. From 1923 to his demobilization in May 1925, Meshcheryakov was a machine gun instructor for the Taganrog Military commissariat. He worked for the Moscow Food Industrial Union between 1925 and 1930 and as a welder at the Moscow Elektrozavod factory from 1930 to 1932. In 1931, he joined the Communist Party of the Soviet Union. Meshcheryakov graduated from evening rabfak in 1932 and from the Moscow Institute of Literature, Philosophy, and History in 1937. He worked as a teacher of philosophy and the foundations of Marxism–Leninism in the Moscow Aviation Institute and the Moscow Institute of Physical Education.

== World War II ==
After Germany invaded the Soviet Union in Operation Barbarossa on June 22, 1941, Meshcheryakov volunteered for Red Army service in July. In August, he took command of a battalion in the 266th Rifle Division's 1010th Rifle Regiment, fighting on the Central Front. Meshcheryakov fought in defensive battles in eastern Belarus and on August 25 was seriously wounded near Dobrush. He spent until October in a hospital in Voronezh, recovering from his wounds. Meshcheryakov was commandant of the city between November and February 1942, and was promoted to captain on November 25. In September 1942 he graduated from regimental commander's improvement courses.

In September, Meshcheryakov was appointed commander of the 273rd Rifle Division's 971st Rifle Regiment, fighting in the Kotluban area as part of the Don Front's 1st Guards Army. He was wounded in the shoulder on September 29, but did not leave the front. On October 3, Meshcheryakov was promoted to major. The division transferred to the 24th Army on October 15, with which it fought until the end of the Battle of Stalingrad. In January 1943, he led the regiment in street fighting in the city itself in the area of Novaya Nadezhda, and the Barrikady and Stalingrad Tractor Factories. For his actions, Meshcheryakov was awarded the Order of the Red Star on January 15 and the Order of Alexander Nevsky on February 6. He was promoted to lieutenant colonel on February 26, 1943. In the northern hemisphere summer and fall of 1943, he led the regiment in Operation Kutuzov, the Battle of Smolensk, and the Gomel–Rechitsa Offensive. On February 22, 1944, he was promoted to colonel.

On 2 June, Meshcheryakov became commander of the 136th Rifle Division, part of the 1st Ukrainian Front's 3rd Guards Army. He led the division in the Lvov–Sandomierz Offensive from mid-July. Meshcheryakov organized a breakthrough of the German defenses in Horokhiv Raion, after which the 136th crossed the Western Bug on 18 July, expanding the bridgehead to 15 kilometers on the next day. This contributed to the successful crossing of the rest of the corps. Continuing the advance, the division reached the Vistula near Annopol by the end of August. At the beginning of September, it was withdrawn to the reserve for replenishment, and in October it was transferred to the Narew bridgehead near Serock, fighting on the defensive from November. On September 23, he was awarded the title Hero of the Soviet Union and the Order of Lenin. Meshcheryakov was dismissed from command on December 26, and on January 7, 1945, Meshcheryakov became deputy commander of the 120th Guards Rifle Division, fighting in the East Prussian Offensive. He became deputy commander of the 41st Rifle Corps in March, fighting in the Berlin Offensive from mid-April to the end of the war in early May.

== Postwar ==
The 41st Rifle Corps was withdrawn to the Belorussian Military District postwar, and Meshcheryakov remained its deputy commander until August 1946. Between 1946 and 1947, he was a special correspondent for the Voyenny Vestnik magazine. In April 1947, Meshcheryakov was sent to Mongolia as a military adviser to the head of the Sukhbataar Military School in Ulaanbaatar. Returning to the Soviet Union in July 1950, he became chief of the Stalingrad Suvorov Military School in Orenburg, which was renamed the Chkalov Suvorov Military School in 1957. On 31 May 1954, he was promoted to major general. Meshcheryakov retired in May 1958, living in Moscow before his death on May 13, 1970. He was buried at the Vagankovo Cemetery.
