= Nikolai Knyzhov =

Russian ice hockey player (born 1998)

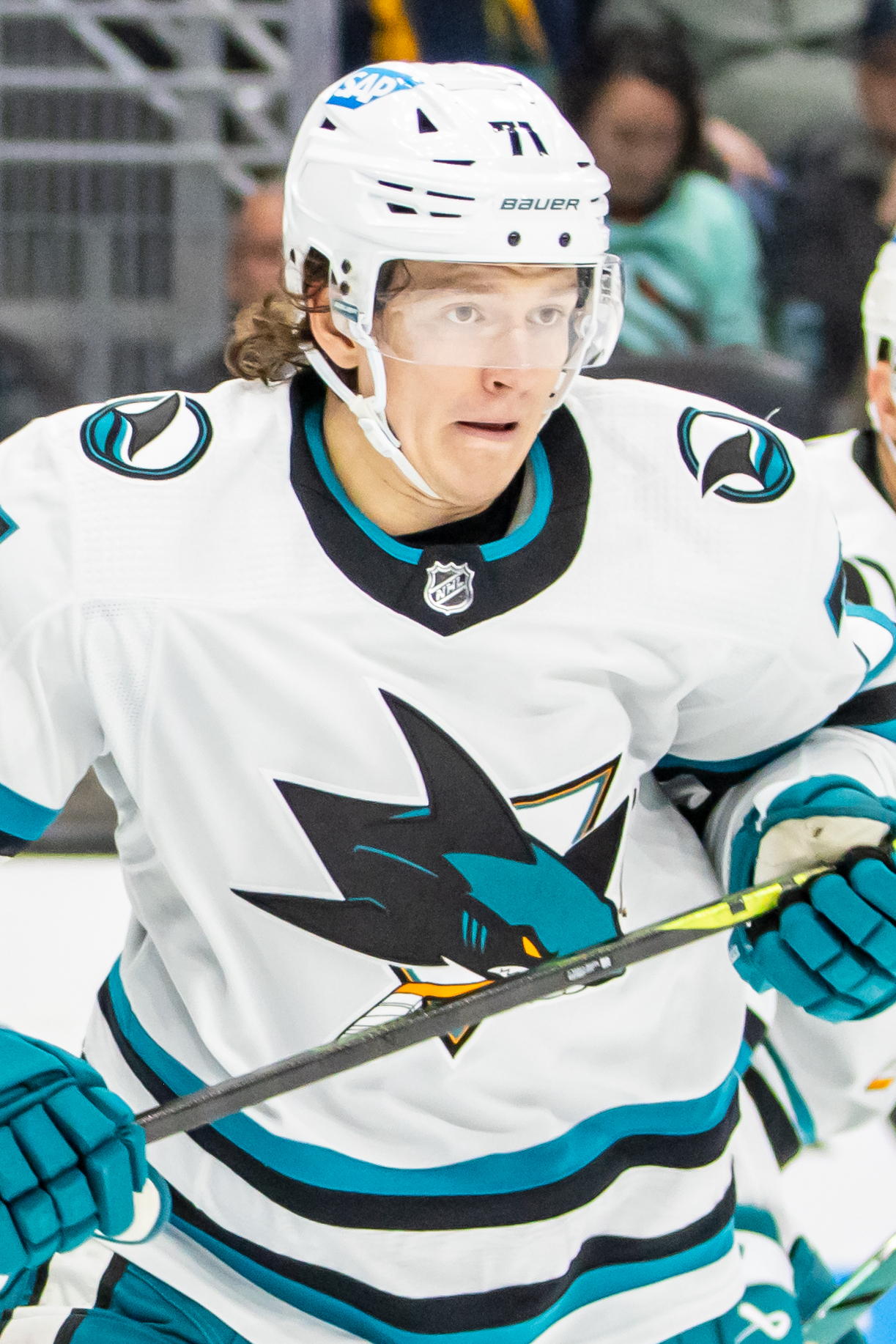
- Born: 20 March 1998 (age 28) Kemerovo, Russia
- Height: 6 ft 3 in (191 cm)
- Weight: 222 lb (101 kg; 15 st 12 lb)
- Position: Defence
- Shoots: Left
- KHL team Former teams: SKA Saint Petersburg; San Jose Sharks
- NHL draft: Undrafted
- Playing career: 2017–present

Nikolai Alexandrovich Knyzhov (Russian: Николай Александрович Кныжов; born 20 March 1998) is a Russian professional ice hockey defenceman who is currently under contract to SKA Saint Petersburg of the Kontinental Hockey League (KHL). He previously played for the San Jose Sharks of the National Hockey League (NHL).

== Playing career ==
Knyzhov first played as a youth in his native Russia with hometown club, Energia Kemerovo, before moving to North America to play amateur junior hockey in Phoenix, Arizona with the Phoenix Firebirds and Jr. Coyotes. He was selected 41st overall in the 2015 CHL Import Draft by the Regina Pats of the Western Hockey League (WHL). He joined the Pats in the 2015–16 season, registering just one assist in 19 games, before being placed on waivers by the team and opting to return the United States, playing with the Springfield Jr. Blues and Austin Bruins in the North American Hockey League (NAHL).

Knyzhov left the Bruins to return to his native Russia, agreeing to play within the SKA Saint Petersburg junior program. In the 2017–18 season, Knyzhov made his professional debut with SKA-Neva in the Supreme Hockey League (VHL). He appeared in 33 games from the blueline, adding two goals and six points in the second tier VHL. Continuing with SKA-Neva in the 2018–19 season, Knyzhov as a defensive defenseman appeared in 46 games with five points. He was recalled by SKA Saint Petersburg and made his Kontinental Hockey League debut, in a 7–1 victory over Dinamo Riga on 26 January 2019. He was returned to SKA-Neva after three scoreless games, and made 11 playoff appearances.

On 2 July 2019, Knyzhov returned to North America after he was signed by the San Jose Sharks to a three-year, entry-level contract. After attending his first training camp with the Sharks, Knyzhov was assigned to begin the 2019–20 season with their American Hockey League (AHL) affiliate, the San Jose Barracuda. He played in 33 games with the Barracuda scoring one goal and five points, showing a sound defensive game, while paired with Nick DeSimone or Nicolas Meloche. Knyzhov was recalled by the injury-hit Sharks on 7 March 2020. He made his NHL debut that night in a 2–1 overtime loss to the Ottawa Senators. He appeared in three games before the NHL suspended the season due to the COVID-19 pandemic on March 12, 2020, and since the Sharks were a not in the contention for a playoff spot at the time, they were not invited to the qualifying round for the 2020 Stanley Cup playoffs.

In the pandemic-delayed 2020–21 season, he recorded his first NHL point on 21 February 2021, in a 4–3 shootout win over the Los Angeles Kings, assisting on the Sharks' second goal, scored by Logan Couture. Knyzhov scored his first NHL goal on 31 March against goaltender Kaapo Kähkönen of the Minnesota Wild. Paired with Erik Karlsson, he appeared in 56 games, scoring two goals and ten points and was one of four rookies that season to appear in every game. Despite not playing in 2021–22 due to a sports hernia and torn adductor muscles that required surgery, he signed a one-year contract extension on 1 April 2022. He tore his achilles in the 2022 off-season. He returned from injury in February 2023 and was assigned to the Barracuda. He made 19 appearances for the Barracuda, adding two assists. He was recalled in March and made his return to San Jose in a game against the Winnipeg Jets on March 6, replacing an injured Radim Šimek in the lineup. He appeared in ten games with the Sharks during the 2022–23 season, registering one assist.

In March 2023, he signed a two-year extension with the Sharks. He started the 2023–24 season with San Jose, playing in ten games with the team, but was a healthy scratch for 13. After the acquisitions of Ty Emberson and Calen Addison, there were too many defencemen on San Jose's roster and Knyzhov was placed on waivers. After going unclaimed, he was assigned to the AHL where he spent the majority of the season with the Barracuda, appearing in 40 games scoring three goals and 14 points.

In June 2024, he was placed on waivers and after going unclaimed, had his contract terminated with the Sharks. As an unrestricted free agent over the off-season, Knyzhov eventually agreed to accept an invitation to attend the Pittsburgh Penguins 2024 training camp on a professional tryout (PTO) on 22 August 2024. After attending the Penguins camp and pre-season, Knyzhov also attended their AHL affiliate's, the Wilkes-Barre/Scranton Penguins, training camp, before he was released by the Penguins without a contract offer. On 11 October, Knyzhov opted to sign as a free agent in the third tiered ECHL, agreeing to a season contract with the Cincinnati Cyclones for the 2024–25 season. Following six games with the Cyclones, Knyzhov returned to Wilkes-Barre/Scranton after signing a PTO with the club on 9 November 2024. Knyzhov was limited to just 14 games with the Penguins, posting two goals and seven points before he was traded to the Grand Rapids Griffins in exchange for future considerations on 11 March 2025. He played out the remainder of the season with Griffins, making 12 appearances, going scoreless.

As a free agent, Knyzhov opted to continue his North American career in the AHL, securing a one-year contract with reigning Calder Cup champions, the Abbotsford Canucks, on 25 July 2025. In 60 games, he registered seven assists.

On 8 August 2026, Knyzhov returned to the KHL as a free agent, re-joining SKA Saint Petersburg on a two-year contract.

== International play ==
Knyzhov was named to Russia's junior team for the 2018 World Junior Ice Hockey Championships. He played in five games as the team finished without a medal.

== Career statistics ==
=== Regular season and playoffs ===
			Regular season					Playoffs
Season	Team	League	GP	G	A	Pts	PIM	GP	G	A	Pts	PIM
2014–15	Phoenix Jr. Coyotes U16	T1EHL	24	1	3	4	16	4	1	1	2	0
2015–16	Regina Pats	WHL	19	0	1	1	8	—	—	—	—	—
2015–16	Springfield Jr. Blues	NAHL	17	0	3	3	8	—	—	—	—	—
2016–17	Austin Bruins	NAHL	4	0	0	0	0	—	—	—	—	—
2016–17	SKA-Serebryanye Lvy	MHL	41	1	7	8	24	—	—	—	—	—
2017–18	SKA-Serebryanye Lvy	MHL	9	1	5	6	10	—	—	—	—	—
2017–18	SKA-Neva	VHL	33	2	4	6	16	12	0	1	1	2
2018–19	SKA-Varyagi	MHL	4	0	4	4	4	—	—	—	—	—
2018–19	SKA-Neva	VHL	46	1	4	5	22	11	0	1	1	4
2018–19	SKA Saint Petersburg	KHL	3	0	0	0	0	—	—	—	—	—
2019–20	San Jose Barracuda	AHL	33	1	4	5	22	—	—	—	—	—
2019–20	San Jose Sharks	NHL	3	0	0	0	2	—	—	—	—	—
2020–21	San Jose Sharks	NHL	56	2	8	10	39	—	—	—	—	—
2022–23	San Jose Barracuda	AHL	19	0	2	2	7	—	—	—	—	—
2022–23	San Jose Sharks	NHL	12	1	0	1	8	—	—	—	—	—
2023–24	San Jose Sharks	NHL	10	0	1	1	6	—	—	—	—	—
2023–24	San Jose Barracuda	AHL	40	3	11	14	24	—	—	—	—	—
2024–25	Cincinnati Cyclones	ECHL	6	0	1	1	2	—	—	—	—	—
2024–25	Wilkes-Barre/Scranton Penguins	AHL	14	2	5	7	19	—	—	—	—	—
2024–25	Grand Rapids Griffins	AHL	12	0	0	0	2	—	—	—	—	—
2025–26	Abbotsford Canucks	AHL	60	0	7	7	13	—	—	—	—	—
KHL totals			3	0	0	0	0	—	—	—	—	—
NHL totals			81	3	9	12	55	—	—	—	—	—

=== International ===
Year	Team	Event	Result	GP	G	A	Pts	PIM
2018	Russia	WJC	5th	5	0	0	0	0
Junior totals				5	0	0	0	0
