= Josef Kořenář =

Czech ice hockey player (born 1998)

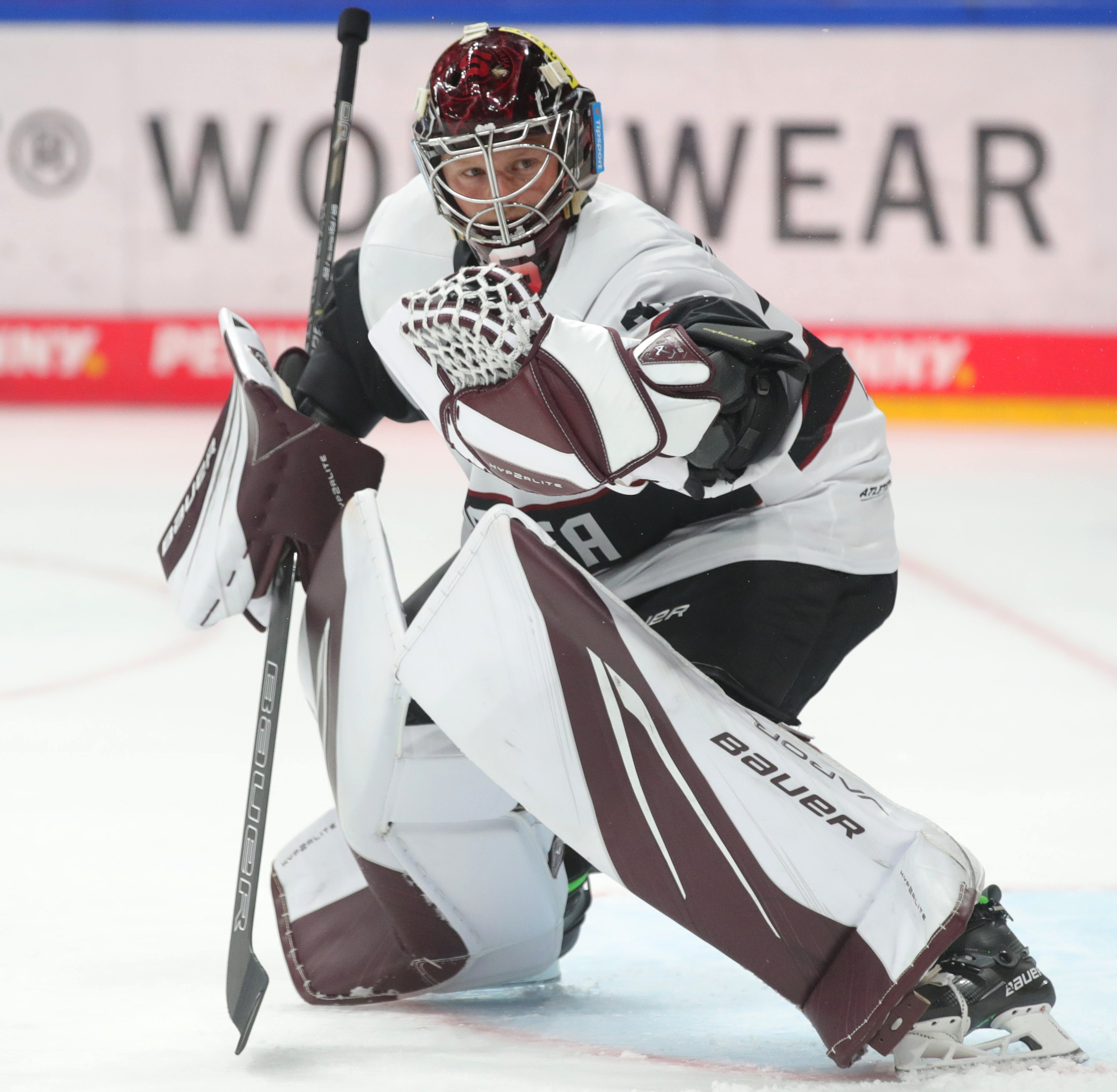
- Kořenář with HC Sparta Praha in 2023
- Born: 31 January 1998 (age 28) Vystrkov, Czech Republic
- Height: 6 ft 1 in (185 cm)
- Weight: 185 lb (84 kg; 13 st 3 lb)
- Position: Goaltender
- Catches: Left
- ELH team Former teams: HC Sparta Praha; HC Dukla Jihlava; HC Oceláři Třinec; San Jose Sharks; Arizona Coyotes
- National team: Czech Republic
- NHL draft: Undrafted
- Playing career: 2017–present

Josef Kořenář (born 31 January 1998) is a Czech professional ice hockey player who is a goaltender for HC Sparta Praha of the Czech Extraliga (ELH). An undrafted player, Kořenář previously played for the San Jose Sharks and the Arizona Coyotes in the National Hockey League (NHL).

== Playing career ==
In July 2017, it was announced that Kořenář had signed an entry-level contract with the San Jose Sharks as an undrafted free agent after spending the 2016–17 season with the Lincoln Stars of the USHL. Kořenář spent the next season on loan to the Dukla Jihlava organization of the Czech Extraliga.

On 26 August 2020, Kořenář was assigned by the San Jose Sharks to HC Oceláři Třinec of the Czech Extraliga, on loan until the commencement of the delayed 2020–21 North American season.

After being in net for the San Jose Barracuda and in the taxi squad for the 2020–21 season, he made his NHL debut on 10 April 2021, in a 2–4 loss to the Los Angeles Kings, playing the final period. He was handed his first start four days later, in a 1–4 loss to the Anaheim Ducks. His first win came on 26 April 2021, in a 6–4 win over the Arizona Coyotes. After the 2020–21 season, he signed a one-year contract extension.

On 17 July 2021, Kořenář was traded by the Sharks along with a second-round draft pick to the Arizona Coyotes for Adin Hill and a seventh-round draft pick.

As an impending restricted free agent with the Coyotes following the 2021–22 season, Kořenář opted to return to his homeland in agreeing to a two-year contract with HC Sparta Praha of the ELH, on 7 June 2022.

== Career statistics ==
=== Regular season and playoffs ===
			Regular season									Playoffs
Season	Team	League	GP	W	L	OT	MIN	GA	SO	GAA	SV%	GP	W	L	MIN	GA	SO	GAA	SV%
2014–15	HC Dukla Jihlava	Czech.20	5	0	5	0	200	15	0	4.50	.887	—	—	—	—	—	—	—	—
2015–16	HC Dukla Jihlava	Czech.20	24	9	15	0	1409	77	0	3.28	.900	3	0	3	179	9	0	3.02	.925
2016–17	Lincoln Stars	USHL	32	14	11	0	1783	66	2	2.22	.925	—	—	—	—	—	—	—	—
2017–18	HC Dukla Jihlava	ELH	9	4	5	0	494	18	1	2.19	.920	—	—	—	—	—	—	—	—
2017–18	HC Benátky nad Jizerou	Czech.1	22	4	18	0	1151	66	1	3.44	.908	—	—	—	—	—	—	—	—
2018–19	San Jose Barracuda	AHL	34	23	8	3	1987	84	4	2.54	.911	4	1	3	226	13	0	3.45	.898
2019–20	San Jose Barracuda	AHL	33	12	16	5	1874	97	2	3.11	.891	—	—	—	—	—	—	—	—
2020–21	HC Oceláři Třinec	ELH	11	8	2	0	663	27	1	2.44	.905	—	—	—	—	—	—	—	—
2020–21	San Jose Barracuda	AHL	8	5	1	2	485	26	0	3.22	.898	4	2	2	236	8	0	2.03	.929
2020–21	San Jose Sharks	NHL	10	3	5	0	492	26	0	3.17	.899	—	—	—	—	—	—	—	—
2021–22	Tucson Roadrunners	AHL	22	3	13	1	1049	78	0	4.46	.855	—	—	—	—	—	—	—	—
2021–22	Rapid City Rush	ECHL	2	2	0	0	120	3	0	1.50	.957	—	—	—	—	—	—	—	—
2021–22	Arizona Coyotes	NHL	2	0	0	0	71	3	0	2.57	.914	—	—	—	—	—	—	—	—
2022–23	HC Sparta Praha	ELH	15	9	4	0	789	29	2	2.21	.901	—	—	—	—	—	—	—	—
2023–24	HC Sparta Praha	ELH	25	20	5	0	1434	50	0	2.09	.923	—	—	—	—	—	—	—	—
2023–24	HC Stadion Litoměřice	Czech.1	1	1	0	0	60	2	0	2.00	.936	—	—	—	—	—	—	—	—
2024–25	HC Sparta Praha	ELH	34	24	9	6	2038	58	6	1.71	.925	8	4	4	478	15	0	1.88	.912
2025–26	HC Sparta Praha	ELH	24	15	8	0	1414	57	1	2.42	.907	12	7	5	780	25	2	1.92	.936
2025–26	HC Stadion Litoměřice	Czech.1	2	1	1	0	120	6	0	3.00	.917	—	—	—	—	—	—	—	—
ELH totals			132	87	38	0	6,832	239	11	2.12	.915	20	11	9	1,258	40	2	1.89	.932
NHL totals			12	3	5	0	563	29	0	3.10	.901	—	—	—	—	—	—	—	—

=== International ===
Year	Team	Event	Result	GP	W	L	T	MIN	GA	SO	GAA	SV%
2015	Czech Republic	IH18	6th	2	1	1	0	119	7	0	3.52	.881
2016	Czech Republic	U18	7th	5	1	4	0	287	19	0	3.97	.881
2018	Czech Republic	WJC	4th	6	2	1	0	267	20	0	4.49	.879
2026	Czechia	WC	5th	4	3	1	0	240	10	0	2.50	.905
Junior totals				13	4	6	0	673	46	0	4.10	.880
Senior totals				4	3	1	0	240	10	0	2.50	.905

== Awards and honors ==
Award	Year	Ref
AHL
All-Star Game	2019	
