= Martin Bodák =

Slovak ice hockey defencemen

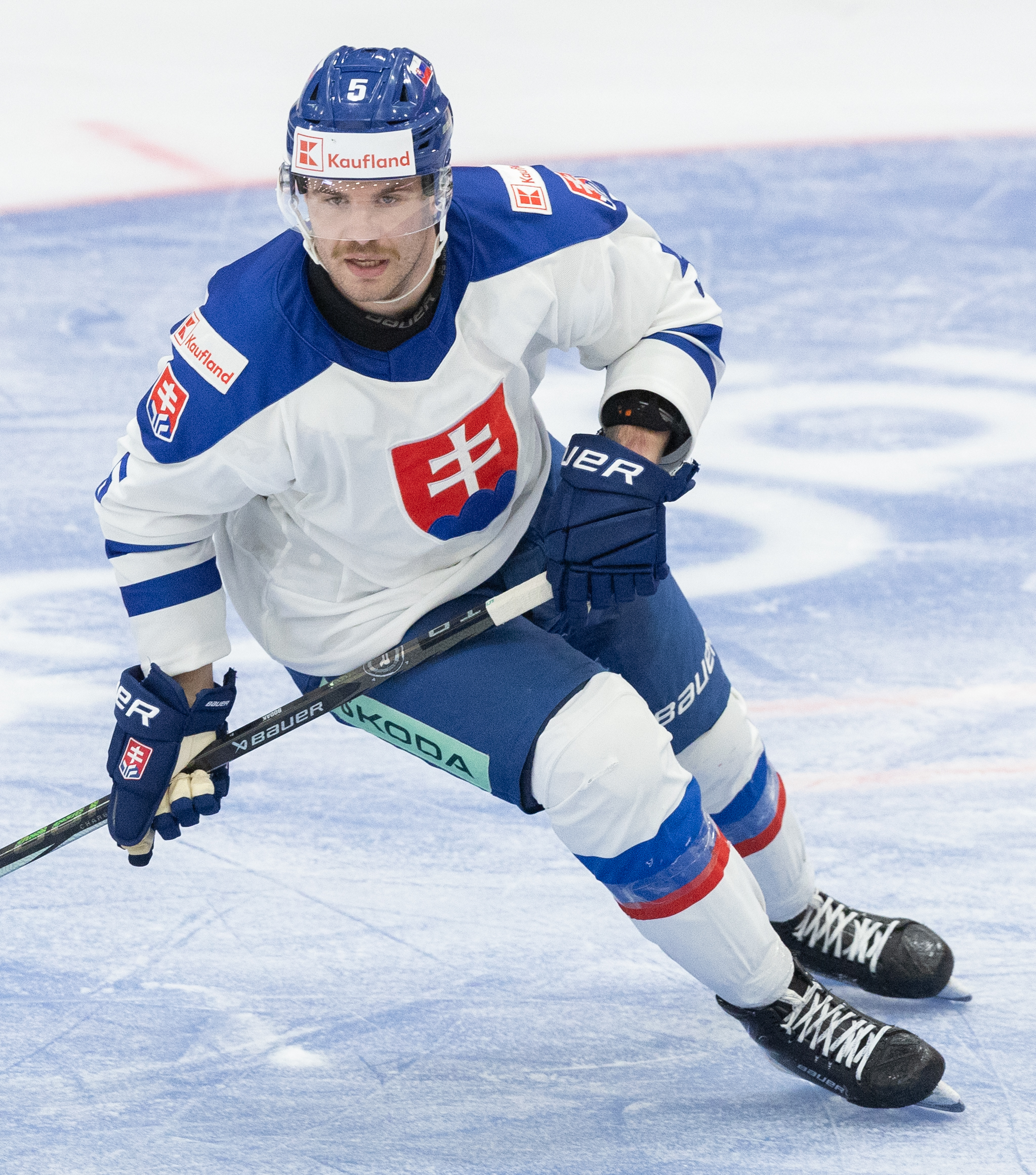
- Bodák in 2026
- Born: 28 November 1998 (age 27) Spišská Nová Ves, Slovakia
- Height: 6 ft 1 in (185 cm)
- Weight: 194 lb (88 kg; 13 st 12 lb)
- Position: Defence
- Shoots: Right
- Slovak team Former teams: HK Poprad; HK Spišská Nová Ves; Tappara; LeKi; HC Vítkovice Ridera; HC Poruba; HC ZUBR Přerov; HK Nitra; HK Dukla Michalovce
- Playing career: 2016–present

Martin Bodák (born 28 November 1998) is a Slovak professional ice hockey defenceman currently playing for HK Poprad of the Slovak Extraliga.

Bodák previously played four games in the Finnish Liiga for Tappara during the 2016–17 Liiga season. He also played two seasons in the Western Hockey League for the Kootenay Ice. He signed with HC Vítkovice Ridera on May 9, 2019.

== Career statistics ==
=== Regular season and playoffs ===
| | | | Regular season | | | | | Playoffs |
| Season | Team | League | GP | G | A | Pts | PIM | GP | G | A | Pts | PIM |

=== International ===
| Year | Team | Event | Result | GP | G | A | Pts | PIM |
|---|---|---|---|---|---|---|---|---|
| 2015 | Slovakia | WJC18 | 7th | 5 | 0 | 0 | 0 | 2 |
| 2016 | Slovakia | WJC18 | 5th | 5 | 0 | 0 | 0 | 4 |
| 2017 | Slovakia | WJC | 8th | 5 | 1 | 0 | 1 | 4 |
| 2018 | Slovakia | WJC | 7th | 5 | 3 | 0 | 3 | 2 |
| Junior totals | | | | 20 | 4 | 0 | 4 | 12 |
