= 2019 NHL entry draft =

2019 North American ice hockey draft

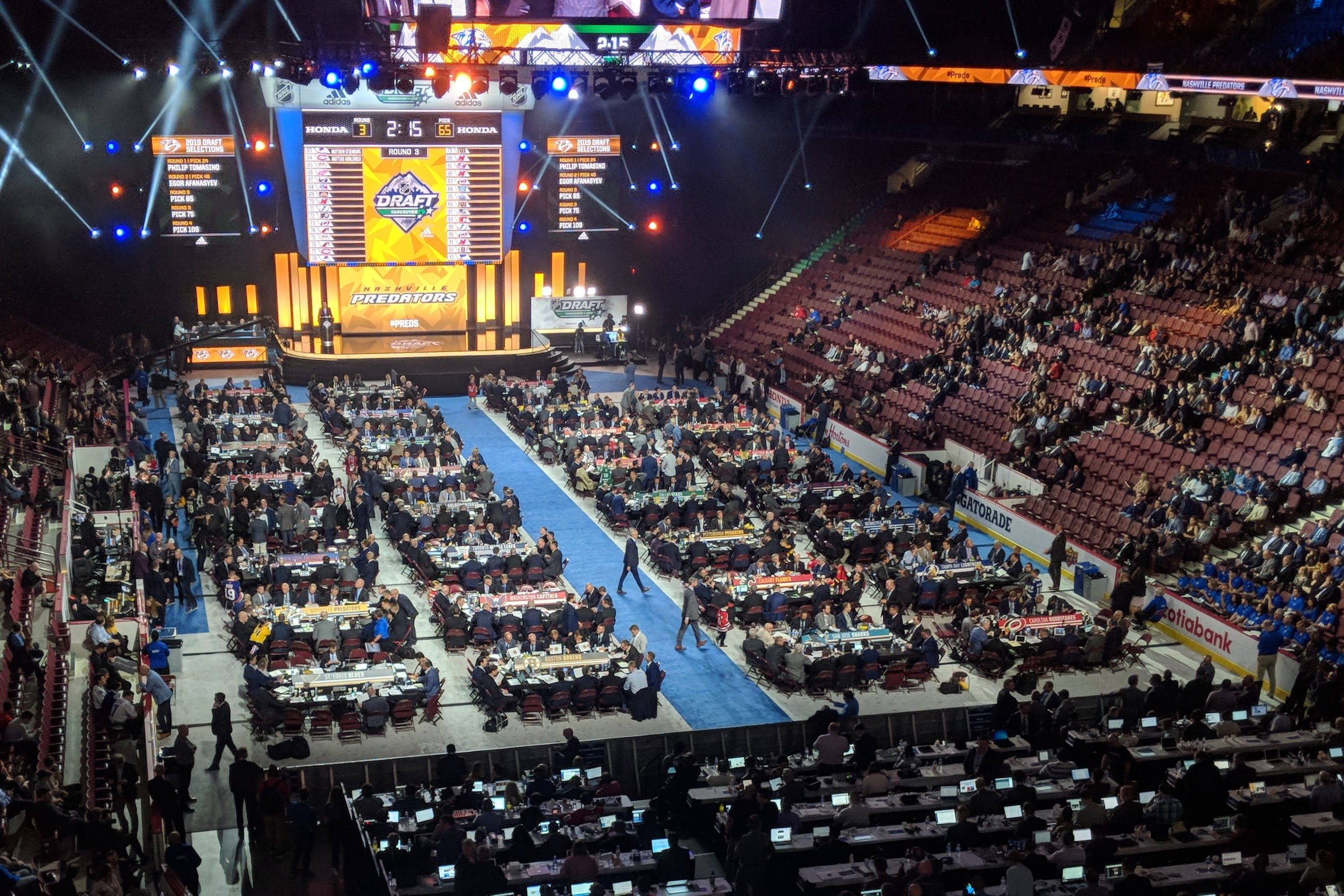
- Rogers Arena during the draft

General information
- Date: June 21–22, 2019
- Location: Rogers Arena; Vancouver, British Columbia, Canada
- Networks: Sportsnet (Canada); NBCSN (United States)

Overview
- 217 total selections in 7 rounds
- First selection: (United States) Jack Hughes (New Jersey Devils)

The 2019 NHL entry draft was the 57th draft for the National Hockey League. It was held on June 21–22, 2019, at Rogers Arena in Vancouver.

The first three selections were Jack Hughes by the New Jersey Devils, Kaapo Kakko by the New York Rangers, and Kirby Dach by the Chicago Blackhawks.

As of 2026, there are 71 active NHL players from this draft.

== Eligibility ==
Ice hockey players born between January 1, 1999, and September 15, 2001, were eligible for selection in the 2019 NHL entry draft. Additionally, un-drafted, non-North American players born in 1998 were eligible for the draft; and those players who were drafted in the 2017 NHL entry draft, but not signed by an NHL team and who were born after June 30, 1999, were also eligible to re-enter the draft.

== Top prospects ==
Source: NHL Central Scouting final (April 15, 2019) ranking.

Ranking	North American skaters	European skaters
1	(United States) Jack Hughes (C)	(Finland) Kaapo Kakko (RW)
2	(Canada) Bowen Byram (D)	(Russia) Vasily Podkolzin (RW)
3	(Canada) Kirby Dach (C)	(Sweden) Victor Soderstrom (D)
4	(United States) Alex Turcotte (C)	(Finland) Ville Heinola (D)
5	(Canada) Dylan Cozens (C)	(Sweden) Philip Broberg (D)
6	(United States) Trevor Zegras (C)	(Germany) Moritz Seider (D)
7	(United States) Arthur Kaliyev (RW)	(Sweden) Tobias Bjornfot (D)
8	(United States) Cole Caufield (RW)	(Russia) Daniil Misyul (D)
9	(United States) Matt Boldy (LW)	(Russia) Ilya Nikolaev (C)
10	(Canada) Peyton Krebs (C)	(Finland) Mikko Kokkonen (D)

Ranking	North American goalies	European goalies
1	(United States) Spencer Knight	(Russia) Pyotr Kochetkov
2	(Denmark) Mads Sogaard	(Sweden) Hugo Alnefelt
3	(Canada) Hunter Jones	(Czech Republic) Lukas Parik

== Draft lottery ==
External videos
- Commissioner Bettman draws lottery for 2019 NHL Draft, NHL's official YouTube channel. April 10, 2019.

Since the 2012–13 NHL season all teams not qualifying for the Stanley Cup playoffs have a "weighted" chance at winning the first overall selection. Beginning with the 2014–15 NHL season the NHL changed the weighting system that was used in previous years. Under the new system the odds of winning the draft lottery for the four lowest finishing teams in the league decreased, while the odds for the other non-playoff teams increased. The first three picks overall in this draft were awarded by lottery on April 9, 2019. The New Jersey Devils, New York Rangers and Chicago Blackhawks won the lotteries that took place on April 9, 2019, giving them the first, second and third picks overall. The New Jersey Devils moved up two spots, while the New York Rangers moved up four spots and Chicago moved up nine spots. In the process, the Colorado Avalanche (previously acquired from Ottawa) and Los Angeles Kings moved down three spots from first and second overall, respectively, while the Detroit Red Wings and Buffalo Sabres moved down two spots, while the Edmonton Oilers, Anaheim Ducks, Vancouver Canucks, Philadelphia Flyers and Minnesota Wild each dropped one spot.

Indicates team won first overall
Indicates team won second overall
Indicates team won third overall
Indicates teams that did not win a lottery

Complete draft position odds
Team	1st	2nd	3rd	4th	5th	6th	7th	8th	9th	10th	11th	12th	13th	14th	15th
Ottawa	18.5%	16.5%	14.4%	50.6%											
Los Angeles	13.5%	13.0%	12.3%	33.3%	27.9%										
New Jersey	11.5%	11.3%	11.1%	13.2%	37.7%	15.2%									
Detroit	9.5%	9.6%	9.7%	2.8%	26.1%	34.0%	8.3%								
Buffalo	8.5%	8.7%	8.9%		8.4%	34.5%	26.7%	4.3%							
NY Rangers	7.5%	7.8%	8.0%			16.3%	38.9%	19.4%	2.1%						
Edmonton	6.5%	6.8%	7.1%				26.0%	39.5%	13.1%	1.0%					
Anaheim	6.0%	6.3%	6.7%					36.8%	36.0%	7.8%	0.4%				
Vancouver	5.0%	5.3%	5.7%						48.8%	30.7%	4.3%	0.1%			
Philadelphia	3.5%	3.8%	4.1%							60.5%	25.7%	2.4%	<0.1%		
Minnesota	3.0%	3.3%	3.6%								69.6%	19.4%	1.1%	<0.1%	
Chicago	2.5%	2.7%	3.0%									78.0%	13.3%	0.4%	<0.1%
Florida	2.0%	2.2%	2.4%										85.5%	7.8%	0.1%
Arizona	1.5%	1.7%	1.8%											91.8%	3.2%
Montreal	1.0%	1.1%	1.2%												96.7%

== Selections by round ==
The order of the 2019 entry draft is listed below.

= NHL All-Star team ·	= NHL All-Star (Note: Players are identified as an All-Star if they were selected for the All-Star game at any time in their career.) ·	= NHL All-Star and NHL All-Star team ·

=== Round one ===
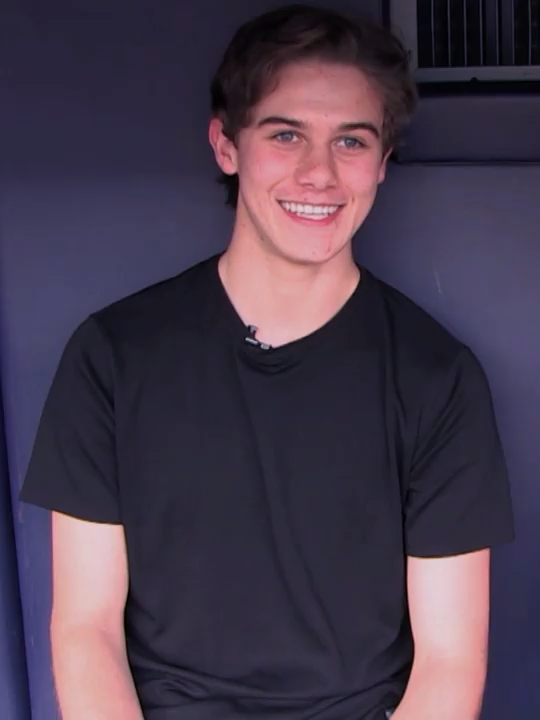
Jack Hughes was selected first overall by the New Jersey Devils.

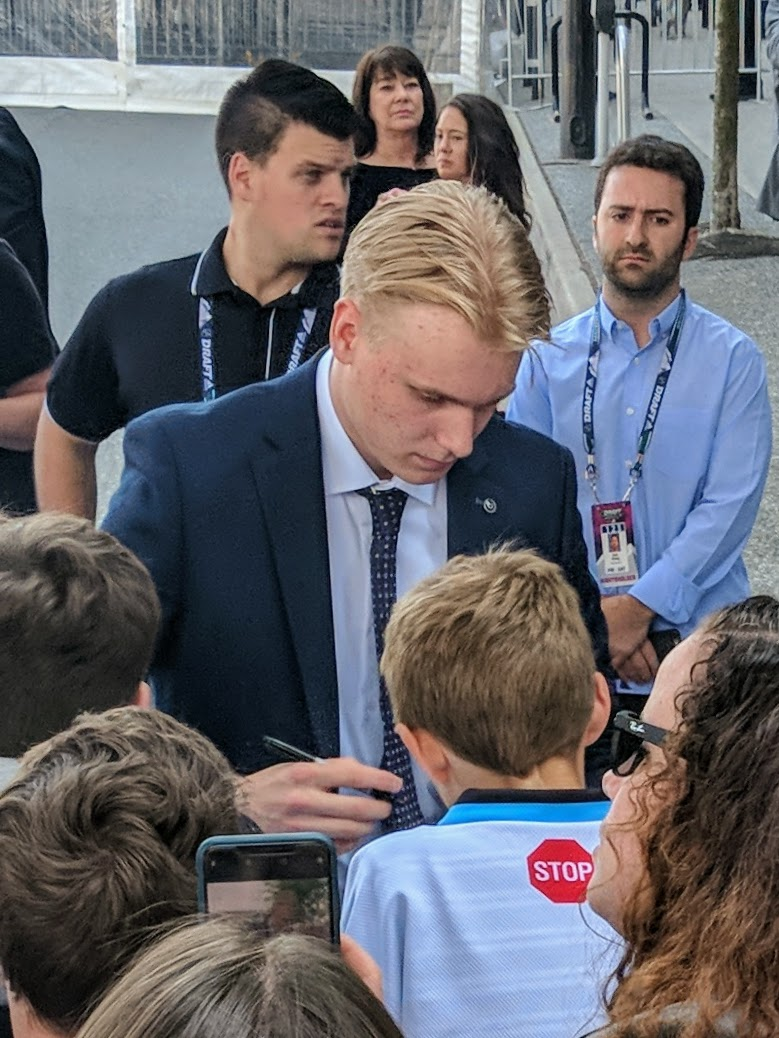
Kaapo Kakko was selected second overall by the New York Rangers.

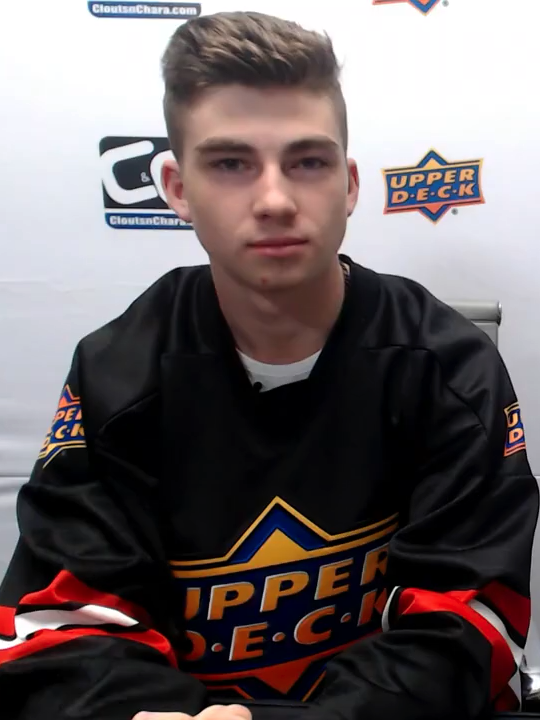
Kirby Dach was selected third overall by the Chicago Blackhawks.

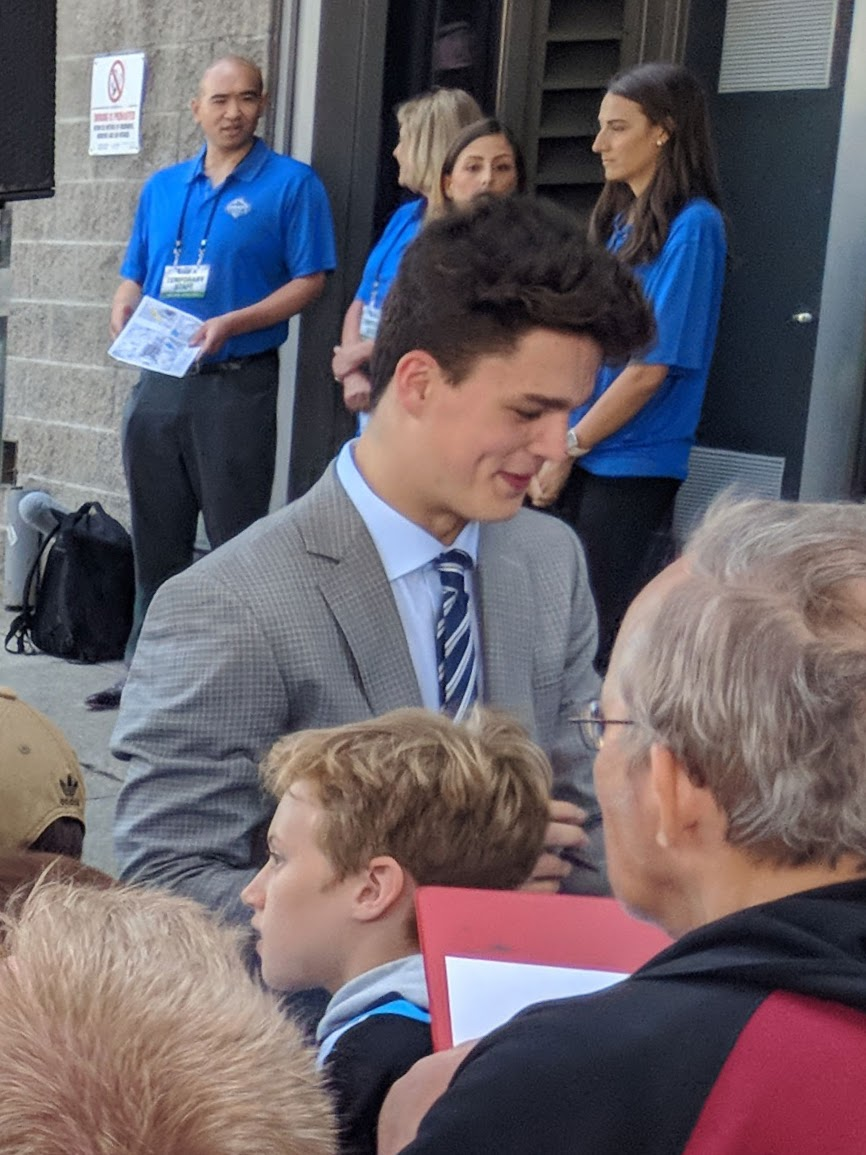
Alex Turcotte was selected fifth overall by the Los Angeles Kings.

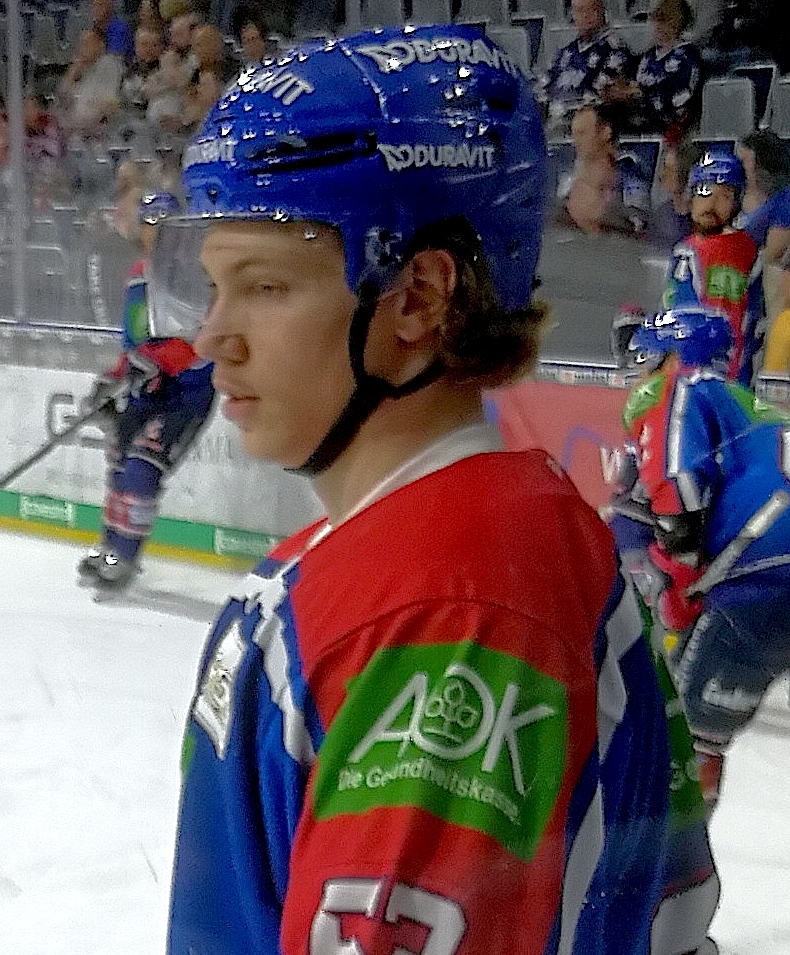
Moritz Seider was selected sixth overall by the Detroit Red Wings.

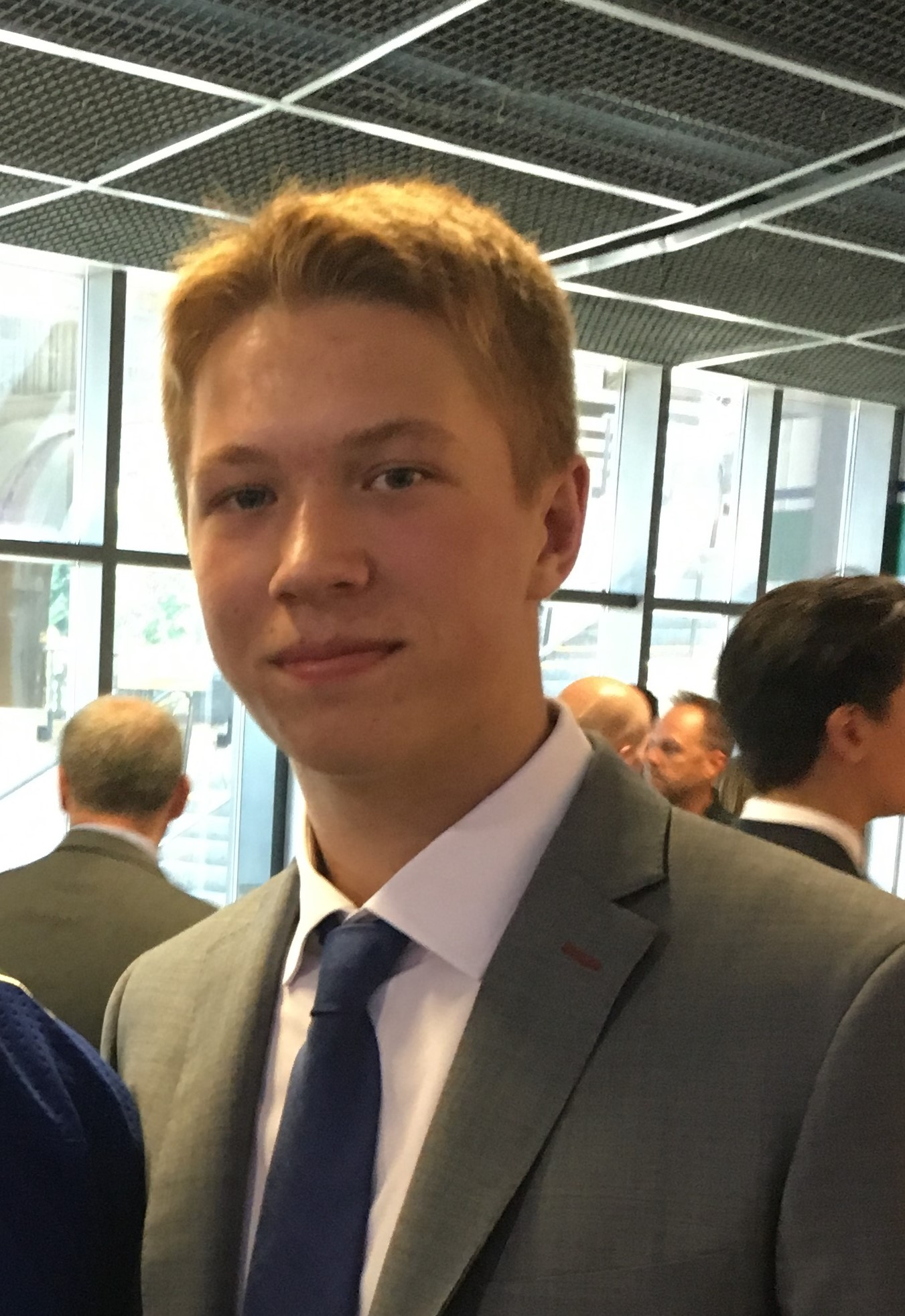
Matthew Boldy was selected 12th overall by the Minnesota Wild.

#	Player	Nationality	NHL team	College/junior/club team
1	Jack Hughes (C)	United States	New Jersey Devils	U.S. NTDP (USHL)
2	Kaapo Kakko (RW)	Finland	New York Rangers	TPS (Liiga)
3	Kirby Dach (C)	Canada	Chicago Blackhawks	Saskatoon Blades (WHL)
4	Bowen Byram (D)	Canada	Colorado Avalanche (from Ottawa)^{1}	Vancouver Giants (WHL)
5	Alex Turcotte (C)	United States	Los Angeles Kings	U.S. NTDP (USHL)
6	Moritz Seider (D)	Germany	Detroit Red Wings	Adler Mannheim (DEL)
7	Dylan Cozens (C)	Canada	Buffalo Sabres	Lethbridge Hurricanes (WHL)
8	Philip Broberg (D)	Sweden	Edmonton Oilers	AIK (HockeyAllsvenskan)
9	Trevor Zegras (C)	United States	Anaheim Ducks	U.S. NTDP (USHL)
10	Vasily Podkolzin (RW)	Russia	Vancouver Canucks	SKA-Neva (VHL)
11	Victor Soderstrom (D)	Sweden	Arizona Coyotes (from Philadelphia)^{2}	Brynäs IF (SHL)
12	Matthew Boldy (LW)	United States	Minnesota Wild	U.S. NTDP (USHL)
13	Spencer Knight (G)	United States	Florida Panthers	U.S. NTDP (USHL)
14	Cam York (D)	United States	Philadelphia Flyers (from Arizona)^{3}	U.S. NTDP (USHL)
15	Cole Caufield (RW)	United States	Montreal Canadiens	U.S. NTDP (USHL)
16	Alex Newhook (C)	Canada	Colorado Avalanche	Victoria Grizzlies (BCHL)
17	Peyton Krebs (C)	Canada	Vegas Golden Knights	Kootenay Ice (WHL)
18	Thomas Harley (D)	Canada	Dallas Stars	Mississauga Steelheads (OHL)
19	Lassi Thomson (D)	Finland	Ottawa Senators (from Columbus)^{4}	Kelowna Rockets (WHL)
20	Ville Heinola (D)	Finland	Winnipeg Jets (from Winnipeg via NY Rangers)^{5}	Lukko (Liiga)
21	Samuel Poulin (RW)	Canada	Pittsburgh Penguins	Sherbrooke Phoenix (QMJHL)
22	Tobias Bjornfot (D)	Sweden	Los Angeles Kings (from Toronto)^{6}	Djurgårdens IF (SHL)
23	Simon Holmstrom (RW)	Sweden	New York Islanders	HV71 Jr. (J20 SuperElit)
24	Philip Tomasino (C)	Canada	Nashville Predators	Niagara IceDogs (OHL)
25	Connor McMichael (C)	Canada	Washington Capitals	London Knights (OHL)
26	Jakob Pelletier (LW)	Canada	Calgary Flames	Moncton Wildcats (QMJHL)
27	Nolan Foote (LW)	Canada	Tampa Bay Lightning	Kelowna Rockets (WHL)
28	Ryan Suzuki (C)	Canada	Carolina Hurricanes	Barrie Colts (OHL)
29	Brayden Tracey (LW)	Canada	Anaheim Ducks (from San Jose via Buffalo)^{7}	Moose Jaw Warriors (WHL)
30	Johnny Beecher (C)	United States	Boston Bruins	U.S. NTDP (USHL)
31	Ryan Johnson (D)	United States	Buffalo Sabres (from St. Louis)^{8}	Sioux Falls Stampede (USHL)

Notes

1. The Ottawa Senators' first-round pick went to the Colorado Avalanche as the result of a trade on November 5, 2017, that sent Matt Duchene to Ottawa in exchange for Kyle Turris, Shane Bowers, Andrew Hammond, a third-round pick in 2019 and this pick (being conditional at the time of the trade). The condition – Colorado will receive a first-round pick in 2019 if the Senators' first-round pick in 2018 is inside the top ten selections and the Senators decide to defer the pick to 2019 – was converted on June 22, 2018.
2. The Philadelphia Flyers' first-round pick went to the Arizona Coyotes as the result of a trade on June 21, 2019, that sent a first and second-round pick in 2019 (14th and 45th overall) to Philadelphia in exchange for this pick.
3. The Arizona Coyotes' first-round pick went to the Philadelphia Flyers as the result of a trade on June 21, 2019, that sent a first-round pick in 2019 (11th overall) to Arizona in exchange for a second-round pick (45th overall) and this pick.
4. The Columbus Blue Jackets' first-round pick went to the Ottawa Senators as the result of a trade on February 22, 2019, that sent Matt Duchene and Julius Bergman to Columbus in exchange for Vitalii Abramov, Jonathan Davidsson, a conditional first-round pick in 2020 and this pick (being conditional at the time of the trade). The condition – Ottawa will receive a first-round pick in 2019 if the Blue Jackets' first-round pick is outside of the top three selections in the 2019 NHL entry draft – was converted when the Blue Jackets clinched a spot in the 2019 Stanley Cup playoffs on April 5, 2019.
5. The Winnipeg Jets' first-round pick was re-acquired as the result of a trade on June 17, 2019, that sent Jacob Trouba to New York in exchange for Neal Pionk and this pick.
  The New York Rangers previously acquired this pick as the result of a trade on February 25, 2019, that sent Kevin Hayes to Winnipeg in exchange for Brendan Lemieux, a conditional fourth-round pick in 2022 and this pick (being conditional at the time of the trade). The condition – New York will receive a first-round pick in 2019 if the Jets first-round pick in 2019 is outside of the first three selections – was converted when the Jets qualified for the 2019 Stanley Cup playoffs on March 23, 2019.
6. The Toronto Maple Leafs' first-round pick went to the Los Angeles Kings as the result of a trade on January 28, 2019, that sent Jake Muzzin to Toronto in exchange for Carl Grundstrom, Sean Durzi and this pick.
7. The San Jose Sharks' first-round pick went to the Anaheim Ducks as the result of a trade on February 24, 2019, that sent Brandon Montour to Buffalo in exchange for Brendan Guhle and this pick (being conditional at the time of the trade). The condition – Anaheim will receive a first-round pick in 2019 if the Blues' first-round pick is between picks 20–31 then Anaheim will have the option to take either St. Louis or San Jose's first-round pick in 2019. – the exact date of conversion is unknown.
  Buffalo previously acquired this pick as the result of a trade on February 26, 2018, that sent Evander Kane to San Jose in exchange for Danny O'Regan, a conditional fourth-round pick in 2019 and this pick (being conditional at the time of the trade). The condition – Buffalo will receive a first-round pick in 2019 if Kane re-signs with the Sharks for the 2018–19 NHL season and if the Sharks qualify for the 2019 Stanley Cup playoffs – was converted on May 24, 2018, and March 19, 2019, respectively.
8. The St. Louis Blues' first-round pick went to the Buffalo Sabres as the result of a trade on July 1, 2018, that sent Ryan O'Reilly to St. Louis in exchange for Vladimir Sobotka, Patrik Berglund, Tage Thompson, a second-round pick in 2021 and this pick (being conditional at the time of the trade). The condition – Buffalo will receive a first-round pick in 2019 if the Blues first-round pick is outside of the top ten selections in the 2019 NHL entry draft – was converted when the Blues qualified for the 2019 Stanley Cup playoffs on March 29, 2019.

=== Round two ===
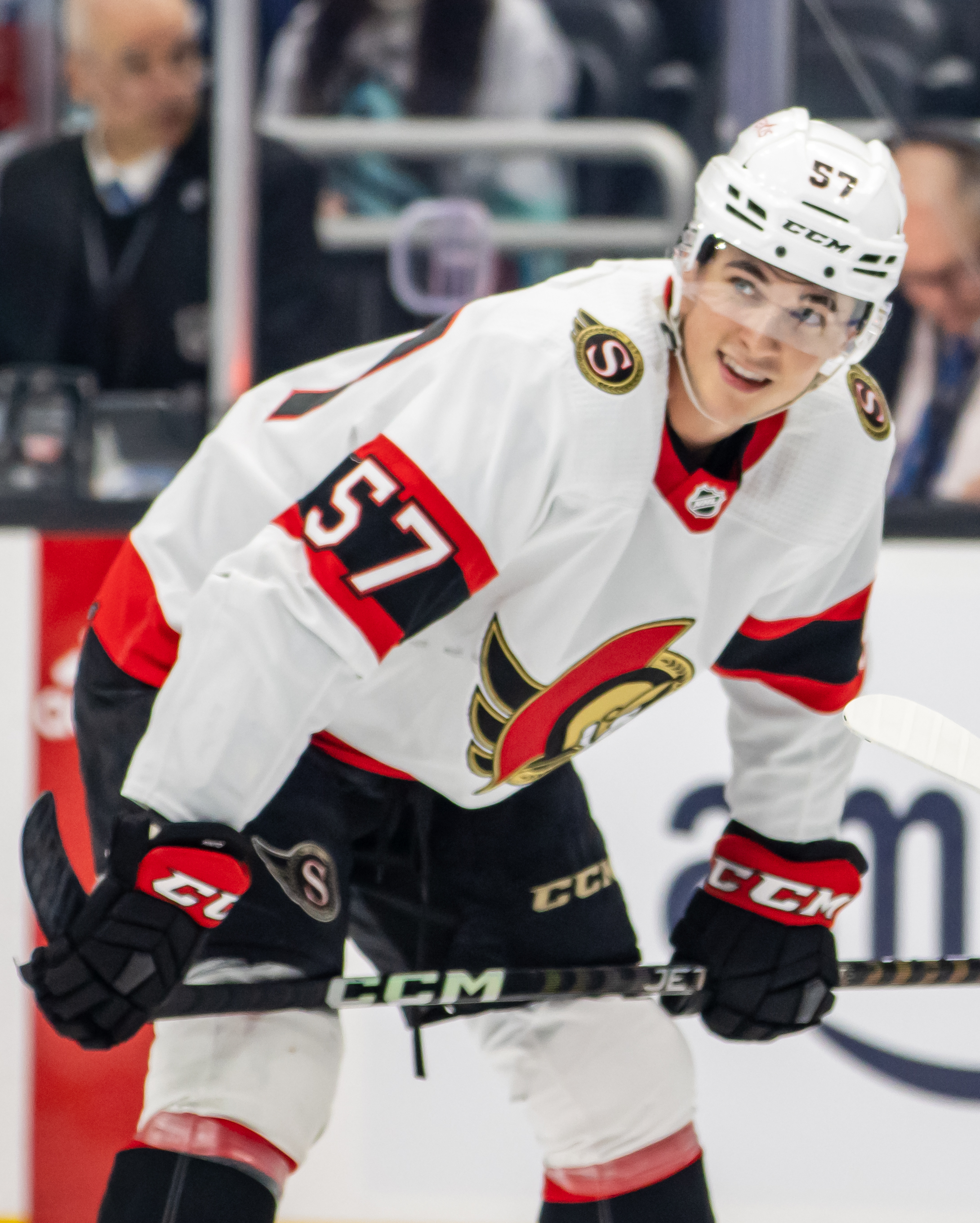
Shane Pinto was selected 32nd overall by the Ottawa Senators.

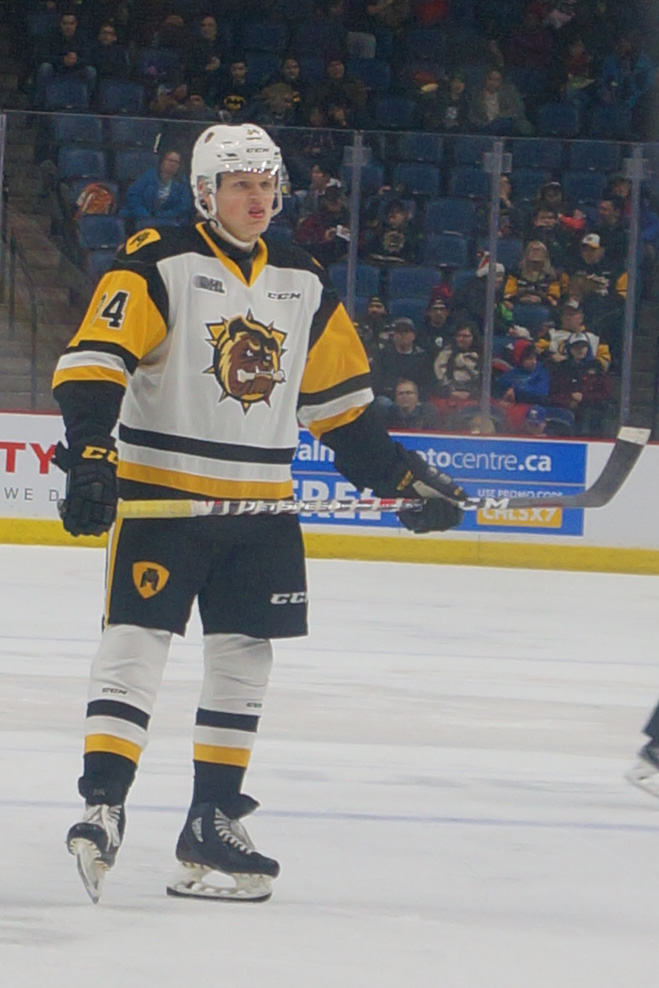
Arthur Kaliyev was selected 33rd overall by the Los Angeles Kings.

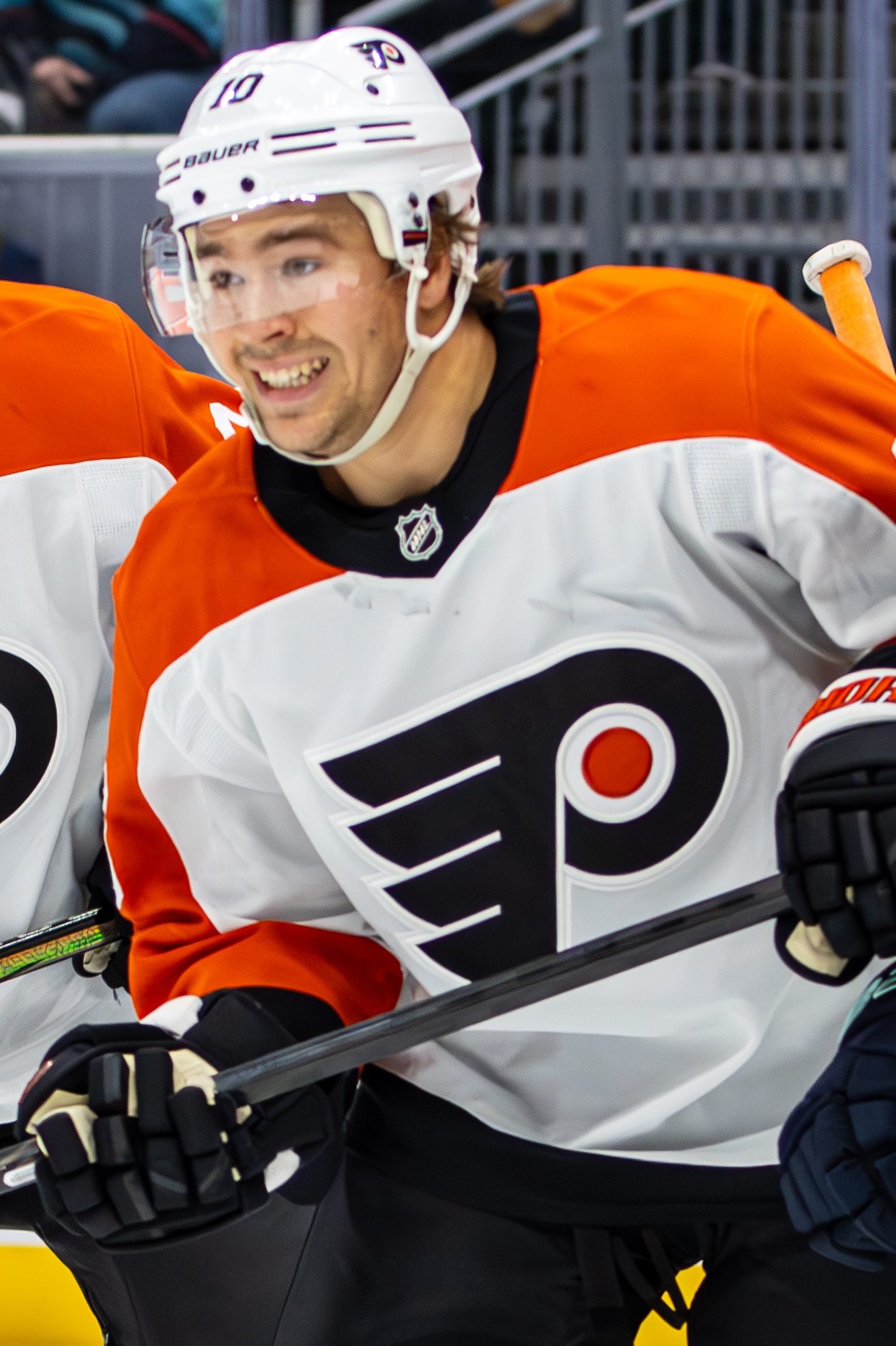
Bobby Brink was selected 34th overall by the Philadelphia Flyers.

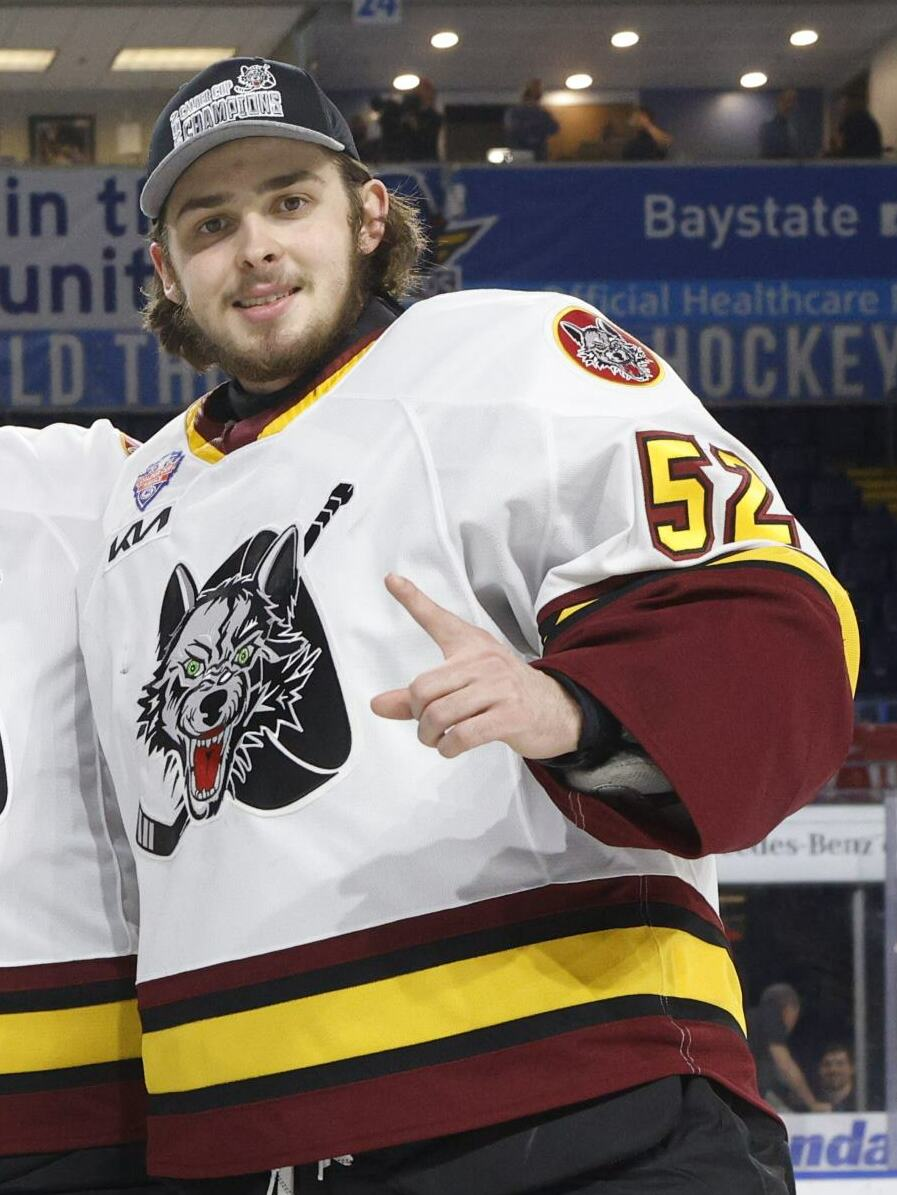
Pyotr Kochetkov was selected 36th overall by the Carolina Hurricanes.

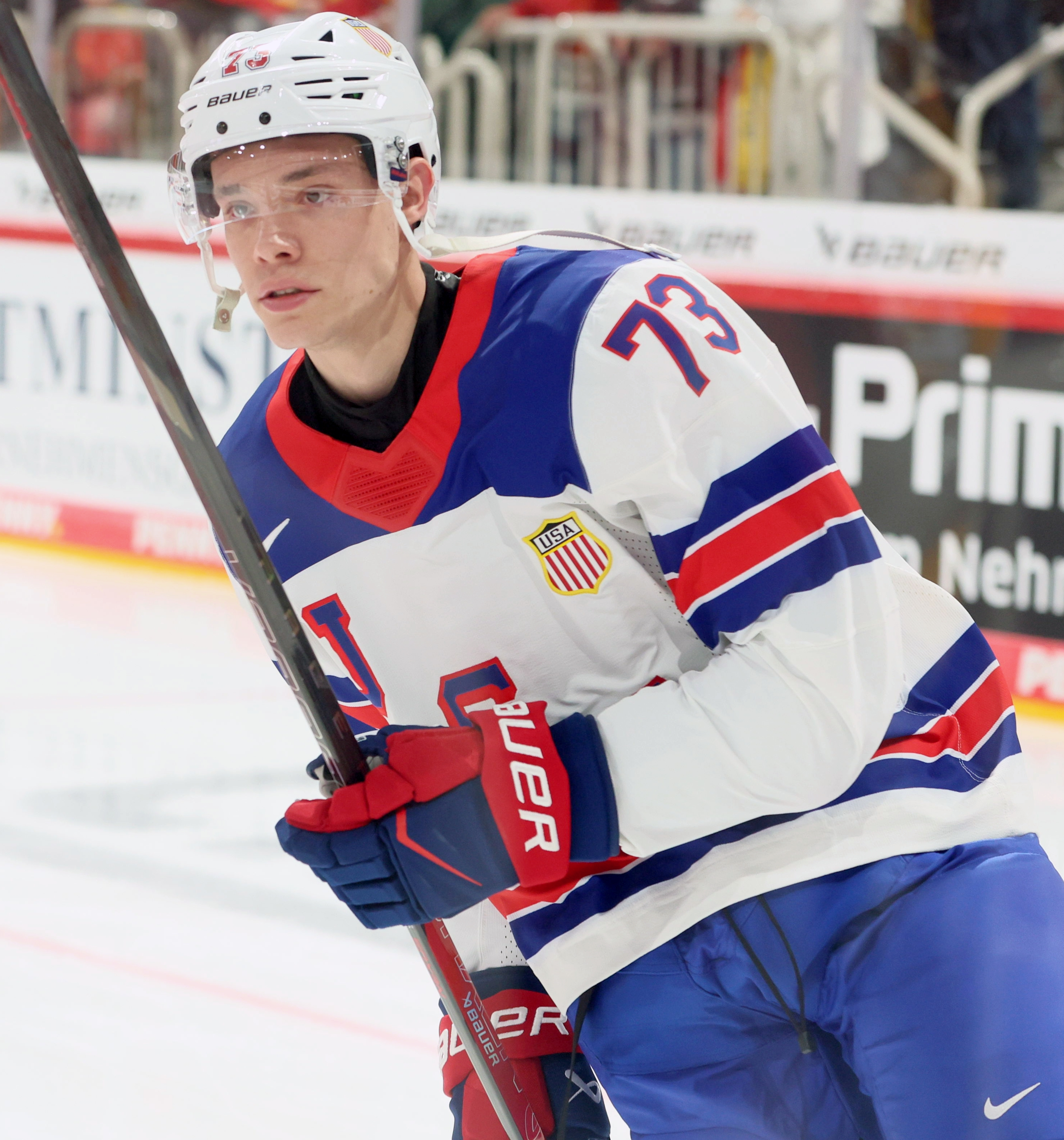
Alex Vlasic was selected 43rd overall by the Chicago Blackhawks.

#	Player	Nationality	NHL team	College/junior/club team
32	Shane Pinto (C)	United States	Ottawa Senators	Tri-City Storm (USHL)
33	Arthur Kaliyev (RW)	United States	Los Angeles Kings	Hamilton Bulldogs (OHL)
34	Bobby Brink (RW)	United States	Philadelphia Flyers (from New Jersey via Nashville)^{1}	Sioux City Musketeers (USHL)
35	Antti Tuomisto (D)	Finland	Detroit Red Wings	Ässät (Liiga)
36	Pyotr Kochetkov (G)	Russia	Carolina Hurricanes (from Buffalo)^{2}	HC Sochi (KHL)
37	Mads Sogaard (G)	Denmark	Ottawa Senators (from NY Rangers via Carolina)^{3}	Medicine Hat Tigers (WHL)
38	Raphael Lavoie (C)	Canada	Edmonton Oilers	Halifax Mooseheads (QMJHL)
39	Jackson LaCombe (D)	United States	Anaheim Ducks	Shattuck-Saint Mary's (USHS)
40	Nils Hoglander (LW)	Sweden	Vancouver Canucks	Rögle BK (SHL)
41	Kaedan Korczak (D)	Canada	Vegas Golden Knights (from Philadelphia via San Jose)^{4}	Kelowna Rockets (WHL)
42	Vladislav Firstov (LW)	Russia	Minnesota Wild	Waterloo Black Hawks (USHL)
43	Alex Vlasic (D)	United States	Chicago Blackhawks	U.S. NTDP (USHL)
44	Jamieson Rees (C)	Canada	Carolina Hurricanes (from Florida via San Jose and Ottawa)^{5}	Sarnia Sting (OHL)
45	Egor Afanasyev (LW)	Russia	Nashville Predators (from Arizona via Philadelphia)^{6}	Muskegon Lumberjacks (USHL)
46	Jayden Struble (D)	United States	Montreal Canadiens	Saint Sebastian's School (USHS)
47	Drew Helleson (D)	United States	Colorado Avalanche	U.S. NTDP (USHL)
48	Artemi Kniazev (D)	Russia	San Jose Sharks (from Vegas)^{7}	Chicoutimi Saguenéens (QMJHL)
49	Matthew Robertson (D)	Canada	New York Rangers (from Dallas)^{8}	Edmonton Oil Kings (WHL)
50	Samuel Fagemo (LW)	Sweden	Los Angeles Kings (from Columbus via Vegas and Montreal)^{9}	Frölunda HC (SHL)
51	Simon Lundmark (D)	Sweden	Winnipeg Jets	Linköpings HC (SHL)
52	Vladislav Kolyachonok (D)	Belarus	Florida Panthers (from Pittsburgh)^{10}	Flint Firebirds (OHL)
53	Nicholas Robertson (LW)	United States	Toronto Maple Leafs	Peterborough Petes (OHL)
54	Robert Mastrosimone (LW)	United States	Detroit Red Wings (from NY Islanders via Vegas)^{11}	Chicago Steel (USHL)
55	Dillon Hamaliuk (LW)	Canada	San Jose Sharks (from Nashville via New Jersey)^{12}	Seattle Thunderbirds (WHL)
56	Brett Leason (RW)	Canada	Washington Capitals	Prince Albert Raiders (WHL)
57	Samuel Bolduc (D)	Canada	New York Islanders (from Calgary)^{13}	Blainville-Boisbriand Armada (QMJHL)
58	Karl Henriksson (C)	Sweden	New York Rangers (from Tampa Bay)^{14}	Frölunda HC (SHL)
59	Hunter Jones (G)	Canada	Minnesota Wild (from Carolina)^{15}	Peterborough Petes (OHL)
60	Albert Johansson (D)	Sweden	Detroit Red Wings (from San Jose)^{16}	Färjestad BK (SHL)
61	Nikita Okhotiuk (D)	Russia	New Jersey Devils (from Boston)^{17}	Ottawa 67's (OHL)
62	Nikita Alexandrov (C)	Russia	St. Louis Blues	Charlottetown Islanders (QMJHL)

Notes

1. The New Jersey Devils' second-round pick went to the Philadelphia Flyers as the result of a trade on June 22, 2019, that sent Arizona's second-round pick and New Jersey's third-round pick both in 2019 (45th and 65th overall) to Nashville in exchange for this pick.
  Nashville previously acquired this pick as the result of a trade on June 22, 2019, that sent P. K. Subban to New Jersey in exchange for Steven Santini, Jeremy Davies, a second-round pick in 2020 and this pick.
2. The Buffalo Sabres' second-round pick went to the Carolina Hurricanes as the result of a trade on August 2, 2018, that sent Jeff Skinner to Buffalo in exchange for Cliff Pu, a third and sixth-round pick in 2020 and this pick.
3. The New York Rangers' second-round pick went to the Ottawa Senators as the result of a trade on June 22, 2019, that sent Florida's second-round pick and Pittsburgh's third-round pick both in 2019 (44th and 83rd overall) to Carolina in exchange for this pick.
  Carolina previously acquired this pick as the result of a trade on April 30, 2019, that sent Adam Fox to New York in exchange for a conditional third-round pick in 2020 and this pick.
4. The Philadelphia Flyers' second-round pick went to the Vegas Golden Knights as the result of a trade on June 22, 2019, that sent a second-round pick and Winnipeg's third-round pick both in 2019 (48th and 82nd overall) to San Jose in exchange for this pick.
  San Jose previously acquired this pick as the result of a trade on June 18, 2019, that sent Justin Braun to Philadelphia in exchange for a third-round pick in 2020 and this pick.
5. The Florida Panthers' second-round pick went to the Carolina Hurricanes as the result of a trade on June 22, 2019, that sent the Rangers' second-round pick (37th overall) to Ottawa in exchange for Pittsburgh's third-round (83rd overall) and this pick.
  Ottawa previously acquired this pick as the result of a trade on September 13, 2018, that sent Erik Karlsson and Francis Perron to San Jose in exchange for Chris Tierney, Dylan DeMelo, Josh Norris, Rudolfs Balcers, a conditional first-round pick in 2019 or 2020, a conditional first-round pick in 2021, a conditional first-round pick no later than 2022 and this pick (being conditional at the time of the trade). The condition – Ottawa will receive the higher of Florida or San Jose's second-round pick in 2019. – was converted on March 26, 2019, when Florida was eliminated from the 2019 Stanley Cup playoffs ensuring that Florida would select higher than San Jose.
  San Jose previously acquired this pick as the result of a trade on June 19, 2018, that sent Mike Hoffman and a seventh-round pick in 2018 to Florida in exchange for Vegas' fourth-round pick in 2018, a fifth-round pick in 2018 and this pick.
6. The Arizona Coyotes' second-round pick went to the Nashville Predators as the result of a trade on June 22, 2019, that sent New Jersey's second-round pick in 2019 (34th overall) to Philadelphia in exchange for New Jersey's third-round pick in 2019 (65th overall) and this pick.
  Philadelphia previously acquired this pick as the result of a trade on June 21, 2019, that sent a first-round pick in 2019 (11th overall) to Arizona in exchange for a first-round pick in 2019 (14th overall) and this pick.
7. The Vegas Golden Knights' second-round pick went to the San Jose Sharks as the result of a trade on June 22, 2019, that sent Philadelphia's second-round pick in 2019 (41st overall) to Vegas in exchange for Winnipeg's third-round pick in 2019 (82nd overall) and this pick.
8. The Dallas Stars' second-round pick went to the New York Rangers as the result of a trade on February 23, 2019, that sent Mats Zuccarello to Dallas in exchange for a conditional third-round pick in 2020 and this pick (being conditional at the time of the trade). The condition – New York will receive a second-round pick in 2019 if the Stars do not advance to the 2019 Western Conference Finals – was converted when the Stars were eliminated from the 2019 Stanley Cup playoffs on May 7, 2019.
9. The Columbus Blue Jackets' second-round pick went to the Los Angeles Kings as the result of a trade on June 22, 2019, that sent a third and fifth-round pick both in 2019 (64th and 126th overall) to Montreal in exchange for this pick.
  Montreal previously acquired this pick as the result of a trade on September 9, 2018, that sent Max Pacioretty to Vegas in exchange for Tomas Tatar, Nick Suzuki and this pick.
  Vegas previously acquired this pick as the result of a trade on June 21, 2017, that ensured that Vegas selected William Karlsson in the 2017 NHL expansion draft from Columbus in exchange for David Clarkson, a first-round pick in 2017 and this pick.
10. The Pittsburgh Penguins' second-round pick went to the Florida Panthers as the result of a trade on February 1, 2019, that sent Nick Bjugstad and Jared McCann to Pittsburgh in exchange for Derick Brassard, Riley Sheahan, Minnesota and Pittsburgh's fourth-round picks both in 2019 and this pick.
11. The New York Islanders' second-round pick went to the Detroit Red Wings as the result of a trade on February 26, 2018, that sent Tomas Tatar to Vegas in exchange for a first-round pick in 2018, a third-round pick in 2021 and this pick.
  Vegas previously acquired this pick as the result of a trade on June 21, 2017, that ensured that Vegas selected Jean-Francois Berube in the 2017 NHL expansion draft from the Islanders in exchange for Mikhail Grabovski, Jake Bischoff, a first-round pick in 2017 and this pick.
12. The Nashville Predators' second-round pick went to the San Jose Sharks as the result of a trade on June 22, 2019, that sent Winnipeg's third-round pick in 2019 (82nd overall) and a third-round pick in 2019 (91st overall) to New Jersey in exchange for this pick.
  New Jersey previously acquired this pick as the result of a trade on February 6, 2019, that sent Brian Boyle to Nashville in exchange for this pick.
13. The Calgary Flames' second-round pick went to the New York Islanders as the result of a trade on June 24, 2017, that sent Travis Hamonic and a conditional fourth-round pick in 2019 to Calgary in exchange for a first and second-round pick in 2018 and this pick (being conditional at the time of the trade). The condition – New York will receive a second-round pick in 2019 if Calgary does not qualify for the 2018 Stanley Cup playoffs – was converted on March 26, 2018.
14. The Tampa Bay Lightning's second-round pick went to the New York Rangers as the result of a trade on February 26, 2018, that sent Ryan McDonagh and J. T. Miller to Tampa Bay in exchange for Vladislav Namestnikov, Libor Hajek, Brett Howden, a first-round pick in 2018 and this pick (being conditional at the time of the trade). The condition – New York will receive a second-round pick in 2019 if the Lightning do not win the Stanley Cup in 2018 or 2019 – was converted on May 23, 2018, and April 16, 2019, respectively when Tampa Bay was eliminated from the playoffs.
15. The Carolina Hurricanes' second-round pick went to the Minnesota Wild as the result of a trade on June 22, 2019, that sent a third-round pick and the Rangers' fourth-round pick both in 2019 (73rd and 99th overall) to Carolina in exchange for this pick.
16. The San Jose Sharks' second-round pick went to the Detroit Red Wings as the result of a trade on February 24, 2019, that sent Gustav Nyquist to San Jose in exchange for a conditional third-round pick in 2020 and this pick (being conditional at the time of the trade). The condition – Detroit will receive the lower of Florida or San Jose's second-round pick in 2019. – was converted on March 26, 2019, when Florida was eliminated from the 2019 Stanley Cup playoffs ensuring that San Jose would select lower than Florida.
17. The Boston Bruins' second-round pick went to the New Jersey Devils as the result of a trade on February 25, 2019, that sent Marcus Johansson to Boston in exchange for a fourth-round pick in 2020 and this pick.

=== Round three ===
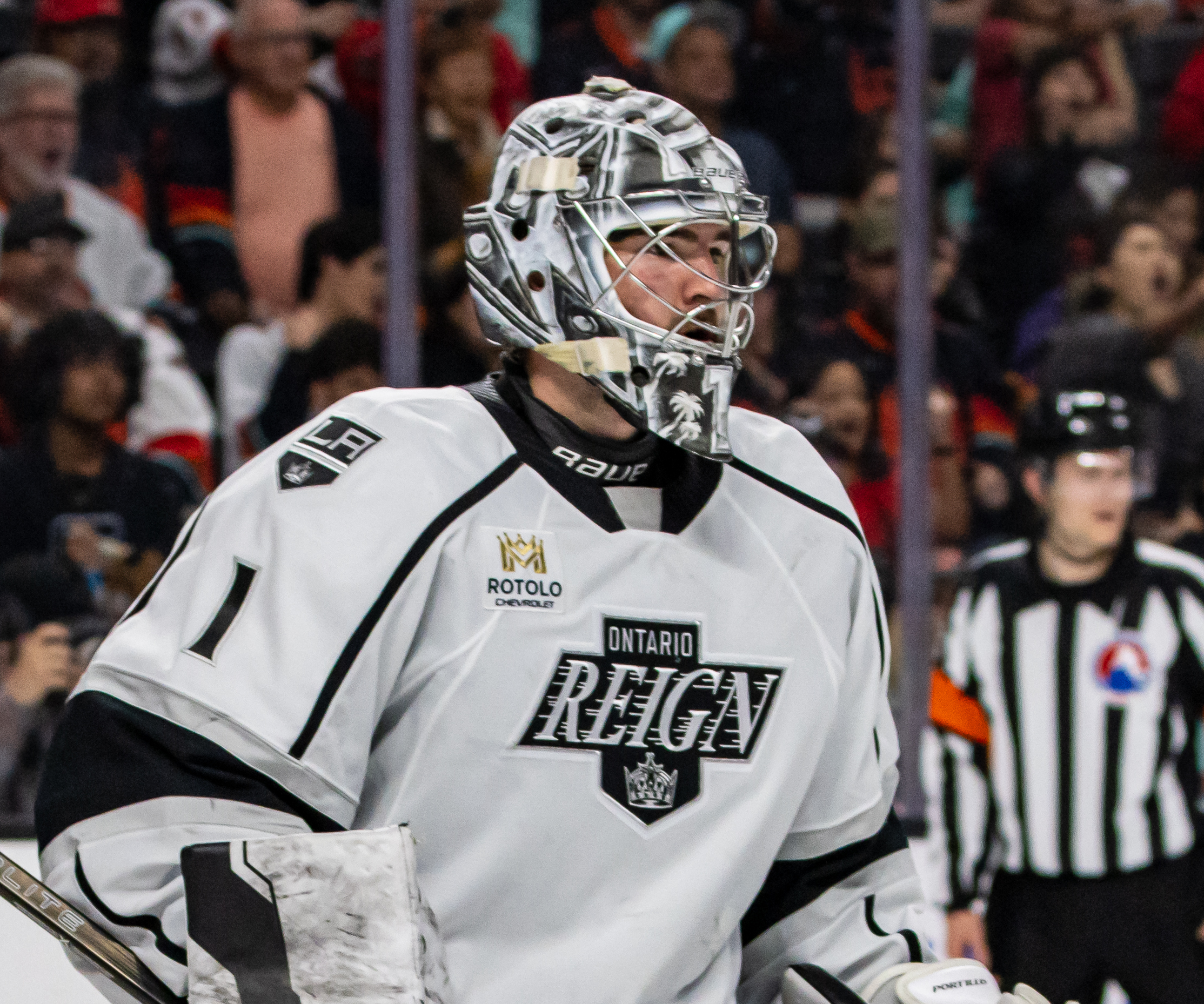
Erik Portillo was selected 67th overall by the Buffalo Sabres.

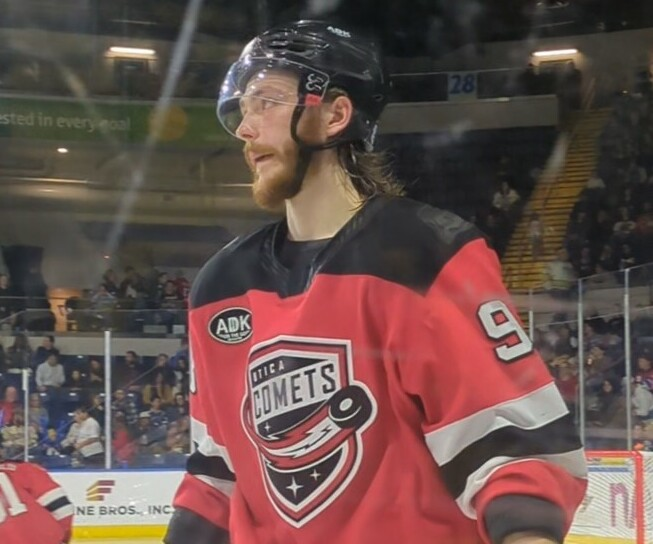
Daniil Misyul was selected 70th overall by the New Jersey Devils.

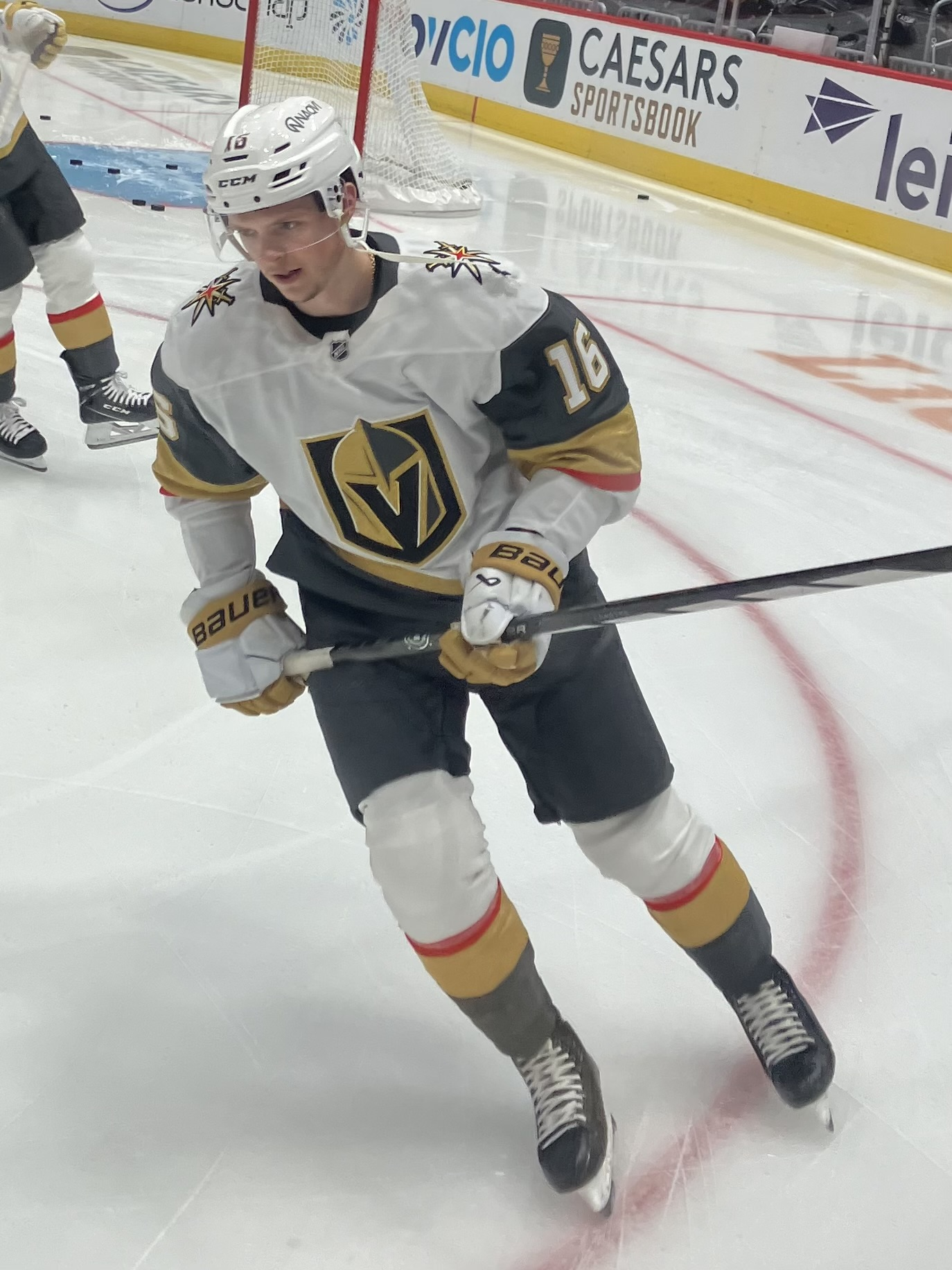
Pavel Dorofeyev was selected 79th overall by the Vegas Golden Knights.

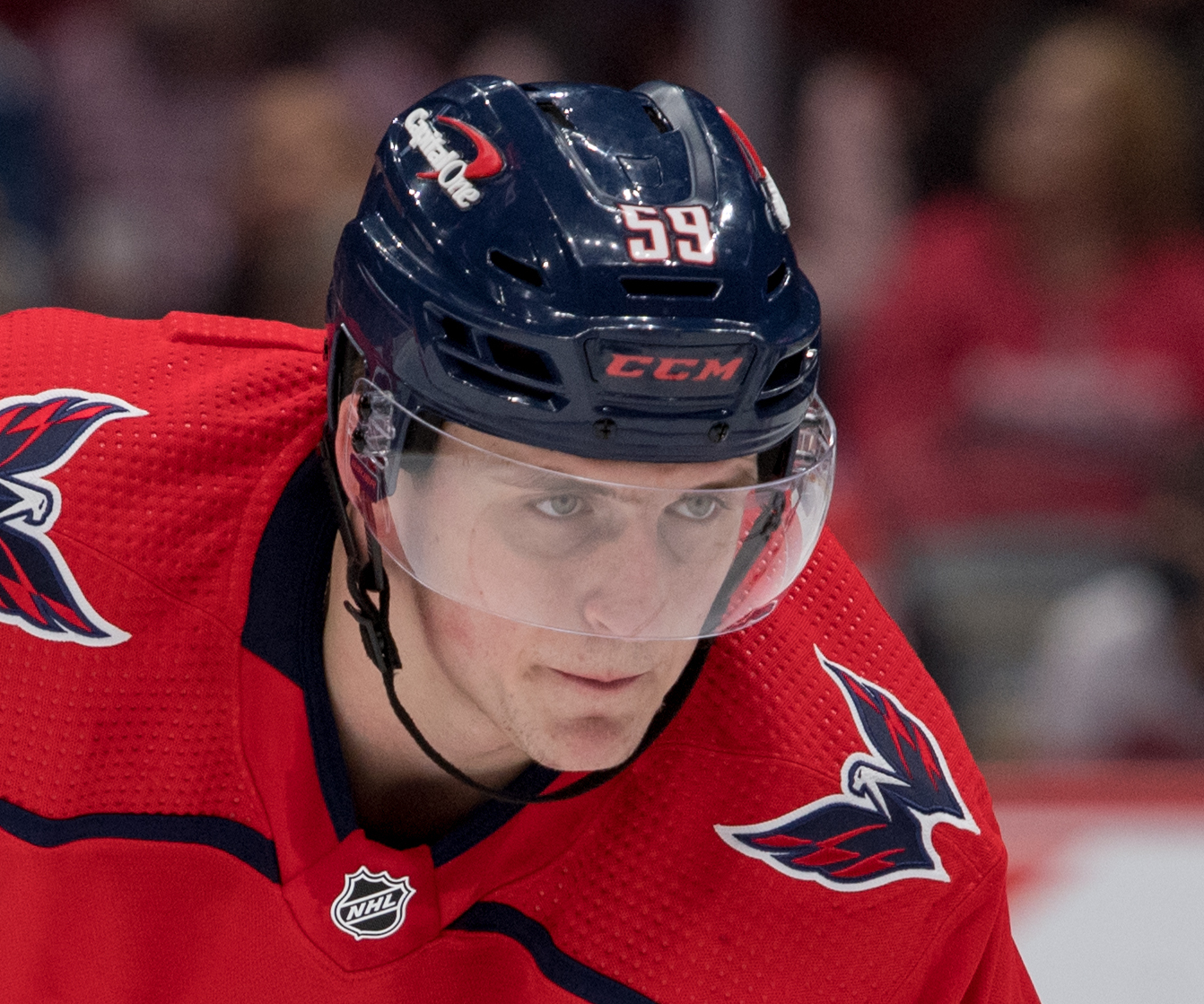
Aliaksei Protas was drafted 91st overall by the Washington Capitals.

#	Player	Nationality	NHL team	College/junior/club team
63	Matthew Stienburg (C)	Canada	Colorado Avalanche (from Ottawa)^{1}	St. Andrew's College (CISAA)
64	Mattias Norlinder (D)	Sweden	Montreal Canadiens (from Los Angeles)^{2}	Modo Hockey (HockeyAllsvenskan)
65	Alexander Campbell (LW)	Canada	Nashville Predators (from New Jersey via Edmonton and Philadelphia)^{3}	Victoria Grizzlies (BCHL)
66	Albin Grewe (RW)	Sweden	Detroit Red Wings	Djurgårdens IF (SHL)
67	Erik Portillo (G)	Sweden	Buffalo Sabres	Frölunda Jr. (J20 SuperElit)
68	Zac Jones (D)	United States	New York Rangers	Tri-City Storm (USHL)
69	John Ludvig (D)	Canada	Florida Panthers (from Edmonton)^{4}	Portland Winterhawks (WHL)
70	Daniil Misyul (D)	Russia	New Jersey Devils (from Anaheim)^{5}	Loko Yaroslavl (MHL)
71	Hugo Alnefelt (G)	Sweden	Tampa Bay Lightning (from Vancouver)^{6}	HV71 Jr. (J20 SuperElit)
72	Ronnie Attard (D)	United States	Philadelphia Flyers	Tri-City Storm (USHL)
73	Patrik Puistola (RW)	Finland	Carolina Hurricanes (from Minnesota)^{7}	Tappara (Liiga)
74	Nathan Legare (RW)	Canada	Pittsburgh Penguins (from Chicago via Arizona)^{8}	Baie-Comeau Drakkar (QMJHL)
75	Adam Beckman (LW)	Canada	Minnesota Wild (from Florida via Nashville)^{9}	Spokane Chiefs (WHL)
76	John Farinacci (C)	United States	Arizona Coyotes	Dexter Southfield School (USHS)
77	Gianni Fairbrother (D)	Canada	Montreal Canadiens	Everett Silvertips (WHL)
78	Alex Beaucage (RW)	Canada	Colorado Avalanche	Rouyn-Noranda Huskies (QMJHL)
79	Pavel Dorofeyev (LW)	Russia	Vegas Golden Knights	Metallurg Magnitogorsk (KHL)
80	Graeme Clarke (RW)	Canada	New Jersey Devils (from Dallas)^{10}	Ottawa 67's (OHL)
81	Cole Schwindt (RW)	Canada	Florida Panthers (from Columbus)^{11}	Mississauga Steelheads (OHL)
82	Michael Vukojevic (D)	Canada	New Jersey Devils (from Winnipeg via Vegas and San Jose)^{12}	Kitchener Rangers (OHL)
83	Anttoni Honka (D)	Finland	Carolina Hurricanes (from Pittsburgh via Vegas and Ottawa)^{13}	JYP Jyväskylä (Liiga)
84	Mikko Kokkonen (D)	Finland	Toronto Maple Leafs	Jukurit (Liiga)
85	Ilya Konovalov (G)	Russia	Edmonton Oilers (from NY Islanders)^{14}	Lokomotiv Yaroslavl (KHL)
86	Layton Ahac (D)	Canada	Vegas Golden Knights (from Nashville)^{15}	Prince George Spruce Kings (BCHL)
87	Lukas Parik (G)	Czech Republic	Los Angeles Kings (from Washington)^{16}	HC Benátky nad Jizerou (Czech 1.liga)
88	Ilya Nikolaev (C)	Russia	Calgary Flames	Loko Yaroslavl (MHL)
89	Maxim Cajkovic (RW)	Slovakia	Tampa Bay Lightning	Saint John Sea Dogs (QMJHL)
90	Domenick Fensore (D)	United States	Carolina Hurricanes	U.S. NTDP (USHL)
91	Aliaksei Protas (C)	Belarus	Washington Capitals (from San Jose via New Jersey)^{17}	Prince Albert Raiders (WHL)
92	Quinn Olson (LW)	Canada	Boston Bruins	Okotoks Oilers (AJHL)
93	Colten Ellis (G)	Canada	St. Louis Blues	Rimouski Océanic (QMJHL)

Notes

1. The Ottawa Senators' third-round pick went to the Colorado Avalanche as the result of a trade on November 5, 2017, that sent Matt Duchene to Ottawa in exchange for Kyle Turris, Shane Bowers, Andrew Hammond, a conditional first-round pick in 2018 and this pick.
2. The Los Angeles Kings' third-round pick went to the Montreal Canadiens as the result of a trade on June 22, 2019, that sent Columbus' second-round pick in 2019 (50th overall) to Los Angeles in exchange for a fifth-round pick in 2019 (126th overall) and this pick.
3. The New Jersey Devils' third-round pick went to the Nashville Predators as the result of a trade on June 22, 2019, that sent New Jersey's second-round pick in 2019 (34th overall) to Philadelphia in exchange for Arizona's second-round pick in 2019 (45th overall) and this pick.
  Philadelphia previously acquired this pick as the result of a trade on March 21, 2018, that sent Cooper Marody to Edmonton in exchange for this pick.
  Edmonton previously acquired this pick as the result of a trade February 26, 2018, that sent Patrick Maroon to New Jersey in exchange for J. D. Dudek and this pick.
4. The Edmonton Oilers' third-round pick went to the Florida Panthers as the result of a trade on December 30, 2018, that sent Alex Petrovic to Edmonton in exchange for Chris Wideman and this pick (being conditional at the time of the trade). The condition – Florida will receive the higher of the Islanders or Oilers' third-round pick in 2019 – was converted on April 1, 2019, when Edmonton was eliminated from the 2019 Stanley Cup playoffs ensuring that the Oilers would select higher than the Islanders.
5. The Anaheim Ducks' third-round pick went to the New Jersey Devils as the result of a trade on November 30, 2017, that sent Adam Henrique, Joseph Blandisi and a third-round pick in 2018 to Anaheim in exchange for Sami Vatanen and this pick (being conditional at the time of the trade). The condition – New Jersey will receive a third-round pick in 2019 if Henrique re-signs with the Ducks for the 2019–20 NHL season prior to Anaheim using their third-round pick in 2019 – was converted on July 16, 2018.
6. The Vancouver Canucks' third-round pick went to the Tampa Bay Lightning as the result of a trade on June 22, 2019, that sent J. T. Miller to Vancouver in exchange for Marek Mazanec, a conditional first-round pick 2020 and this pick.
7. The Minnesota Wild's third-round pick went to the Carolina Hurricanes as the result of a trade on June 22, 2019, that sent a second-round pick in 2019 (59th overall) to Minnesota in exchange for the Rangers' fourth-round pick in 2019 (99th overall) and this pick.
8. The Chicago Blackhawks' third-round pick went to the Pittsburgh Penguins as the result of a trade on June 22, 2019, that sent Buffalo's fourth-round pick, Tampa Bay's fifth-round pick and a seventh-round pick all in 2019 (98th, 151st and 207th overall) to Arizona in exchange for this pick.
  Arizona previously acquired this pick as the result of a trade on July 12, 2018, that sent Marcus Kruger, MacKenzie Entwistle, Jordan Maletta, Andrew Campbell and a fifth-round pick in 2019 to Chicago in exchange for Marian Hossa, Vinnie Hinostroza, Jordan Oesterle and this pick.
9. The Florida Panthers' third-round pick went to the Minnesota Wild as the result of a trade on June 22, 2019, that sent a third-round pick in 2020 to Nashville in exchange for this pick.
  Nashville previously acquired this pick as the result of a trade on June 23, 2018, that sent a third-round pick in 2018 to Florida in exchange for this pick.
10. The Dallas Stars' third-round pick went to the New Jersey Devils as the result of a trade on February 23, 2019, that sent Ben Lovejoy to Dallas in exchange for Connor Carrick and this pick.
11. The Columbus Blue Jackets' third-round pick went to the Florida Panthers as the result of a trade on June 22, 2019, that sent Minnesota and Pittsburgh's fourth-round picks both in 2019 (104th and 114th overall) to Columbus in exchange for this pick.
12. The Winnipeg Jets' third-round pick went to the New Jersey Devils as the result of a trade on June 22, 2019, that sent Nashville's second-round pick in 2019 (55th overall) to San Jose in exchange for a third-round pick in 2019 (91st overall) and this pick.
  San Jose previously acquired this pick as the result of a trade on June 22, 2019, that sent Philadelphia's second-round pick in 2019 (41st overall) to Vegas in exchange for a second-round pick in 2019 (48th overall) and this pick.
  Vegas previously acquired this pick as the result of a trade on June 21, 2017, that sent Columbus' first-round pick in 2017 to Winnipeg and ensured that Vegas selected Chris Thorburn in the 2017 NHL expansion draft from Winnipeg in exchange for a first-round pick in 2017 and this pick.
13. The Pittsburgh Penguins' third-round pick went to the Carolina Hurricanes as the result of a trade on June 22, 2019, that sent the Rangers' second-round pick in 2019 (37th overall) to Ottawa in exchange for Florida's second-round pick in 2019 (44th overall) and this pick.
  Ottawa previously acquired this pick as the result of a trade on February 23, 2018, that sent Derick Brassard to Vegas in exchange for this pick.
  Vegas previously acquired this pick as the result of a trade February 23, 2018, that sent Tobias Lindberg to Pittsburgh in exchange for this pick.
14. The New York Islanders' third-round pick went to the Edmonton Oilers as the result of a trade on February 24, 2018, that sent Brandon Davidson to New York in exchange for this pick.
15. The Nashville Predators' third-round pick went to the Vegas Golden Knights as the result of a trade on July 1, 2017, that sent Alexei Emelin to Nashville in exchange for this pick.
16. The Washington Capitals' third-round pick went to the Los Angeles Kings as the result of a trade on February 21, 2019, that sent Carl Hagelin to Washington in exchange for a conditional sixth-round pick in 2020 and this pick.
17. The San Jose Sharks' third-round pick went to the Washington Capitals as the result of a trade on June 22, 2019, that sent a fourth-round pick and Buffalo's fifth-round pick both in 2019 (118th and 129th overall) to New Jersey in exchange for this pick.
  New Jersey previously acquired this pick as the result of a trade on June 22, 2019, that sent Nashville's second-round pick in 2019 (55th overall) to San Jose in exchange for Winnipeg's third-round pick in 2019 (82nd overall) and this pick.

=== Round four ===
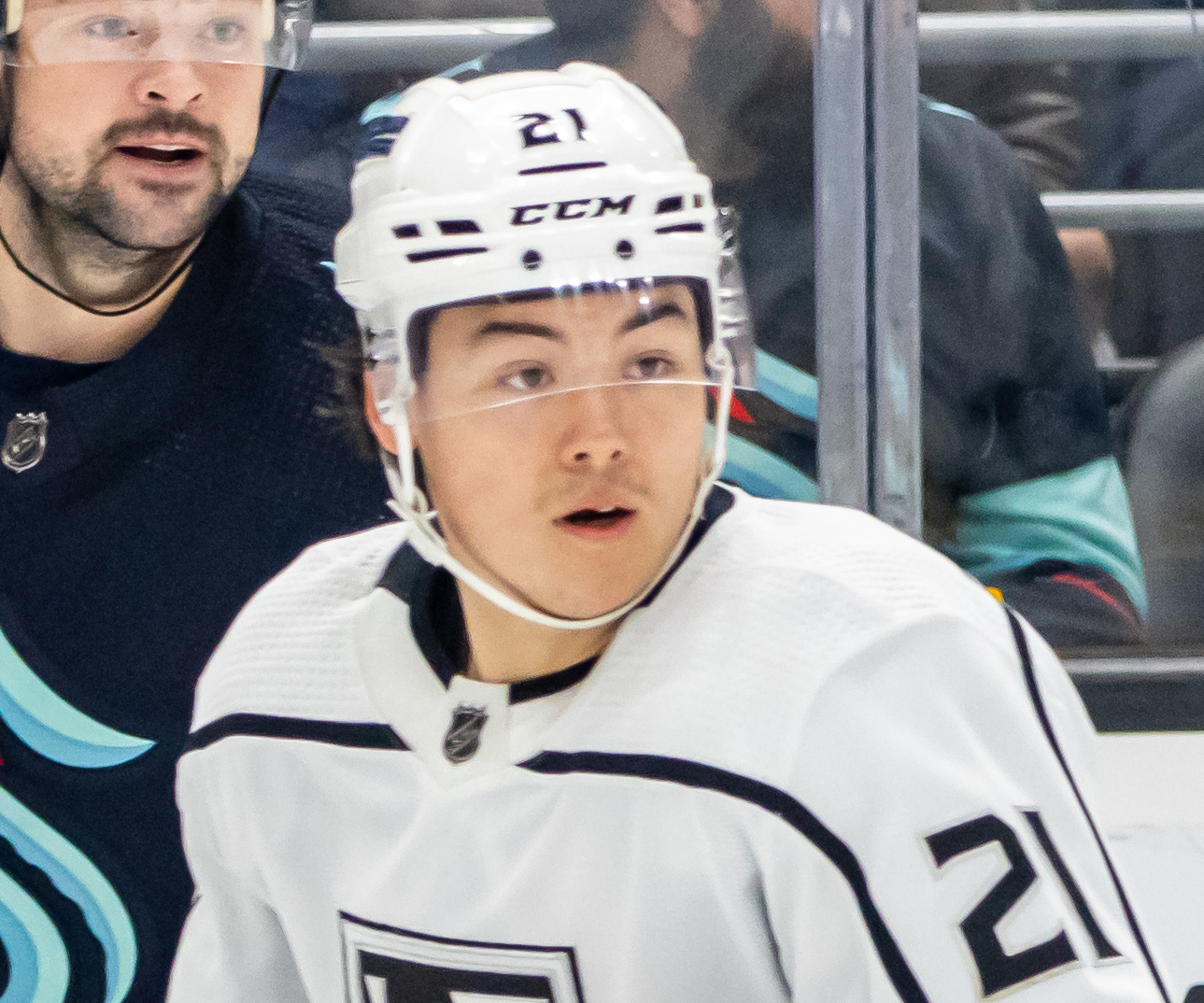
Jordan Spence was selected 95th overall by the Los Angeles Kings.

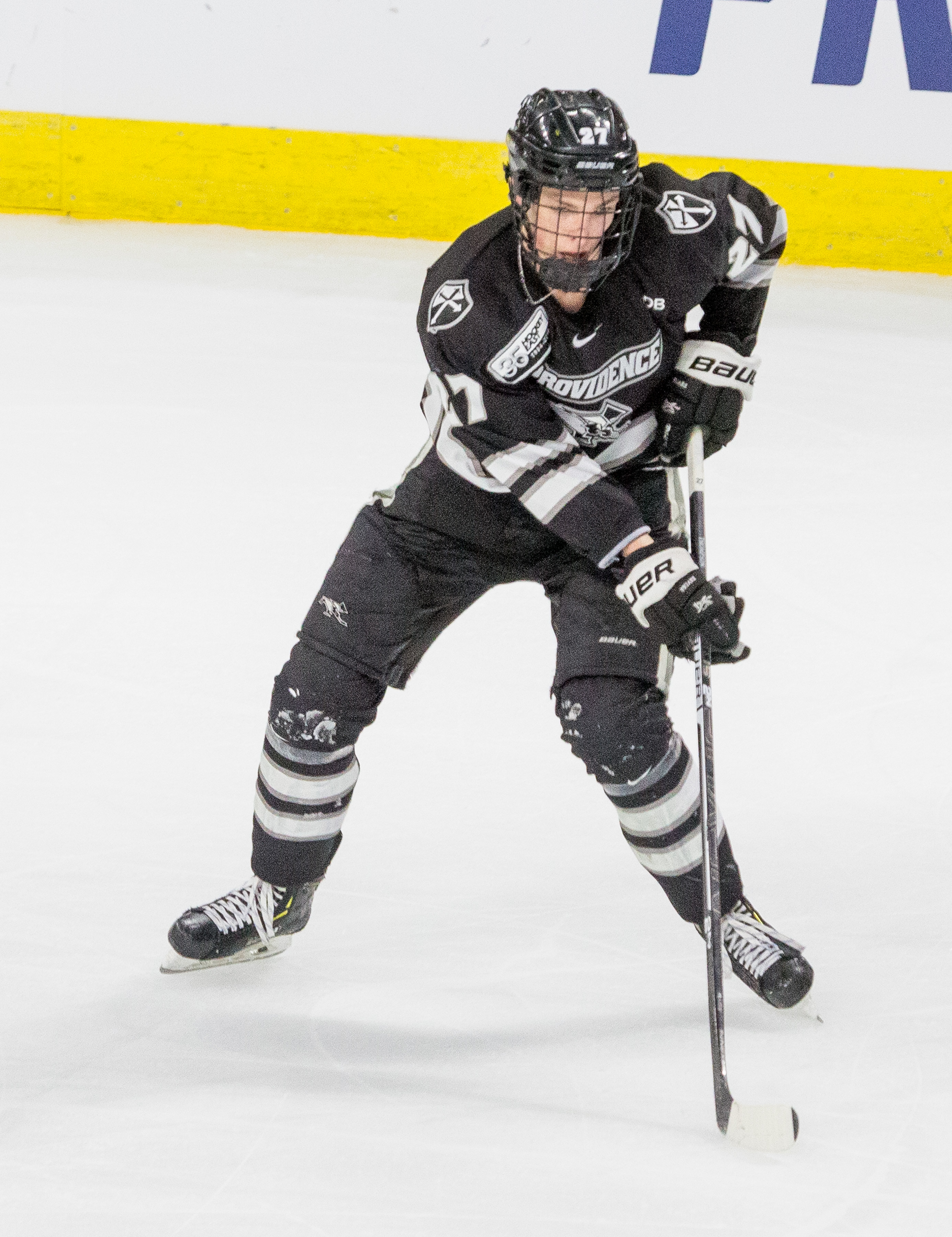
Tyce Thompson was selected 96th overall by the New Jersey Devils.

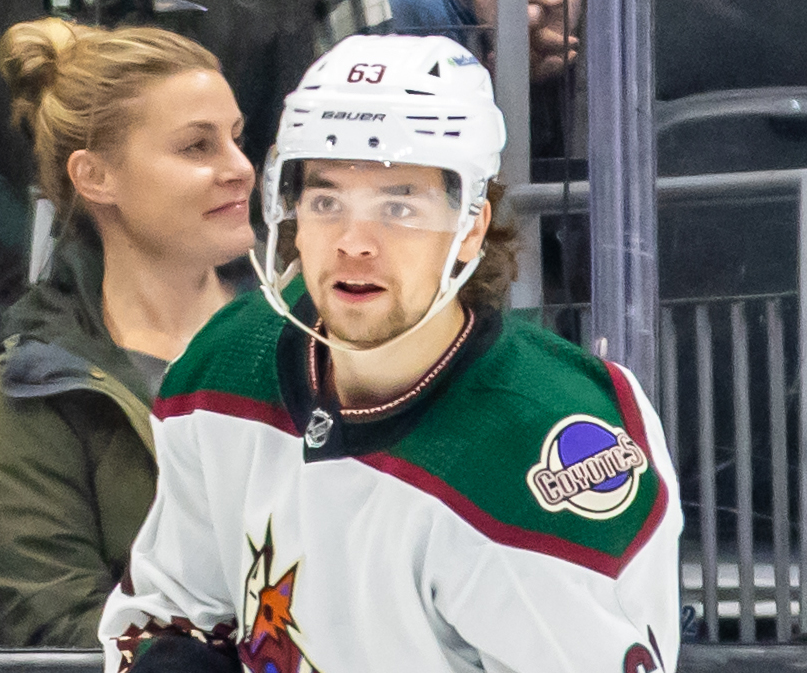
Matias Maccelli was selected 98th overall by the Arizona Coyotes.

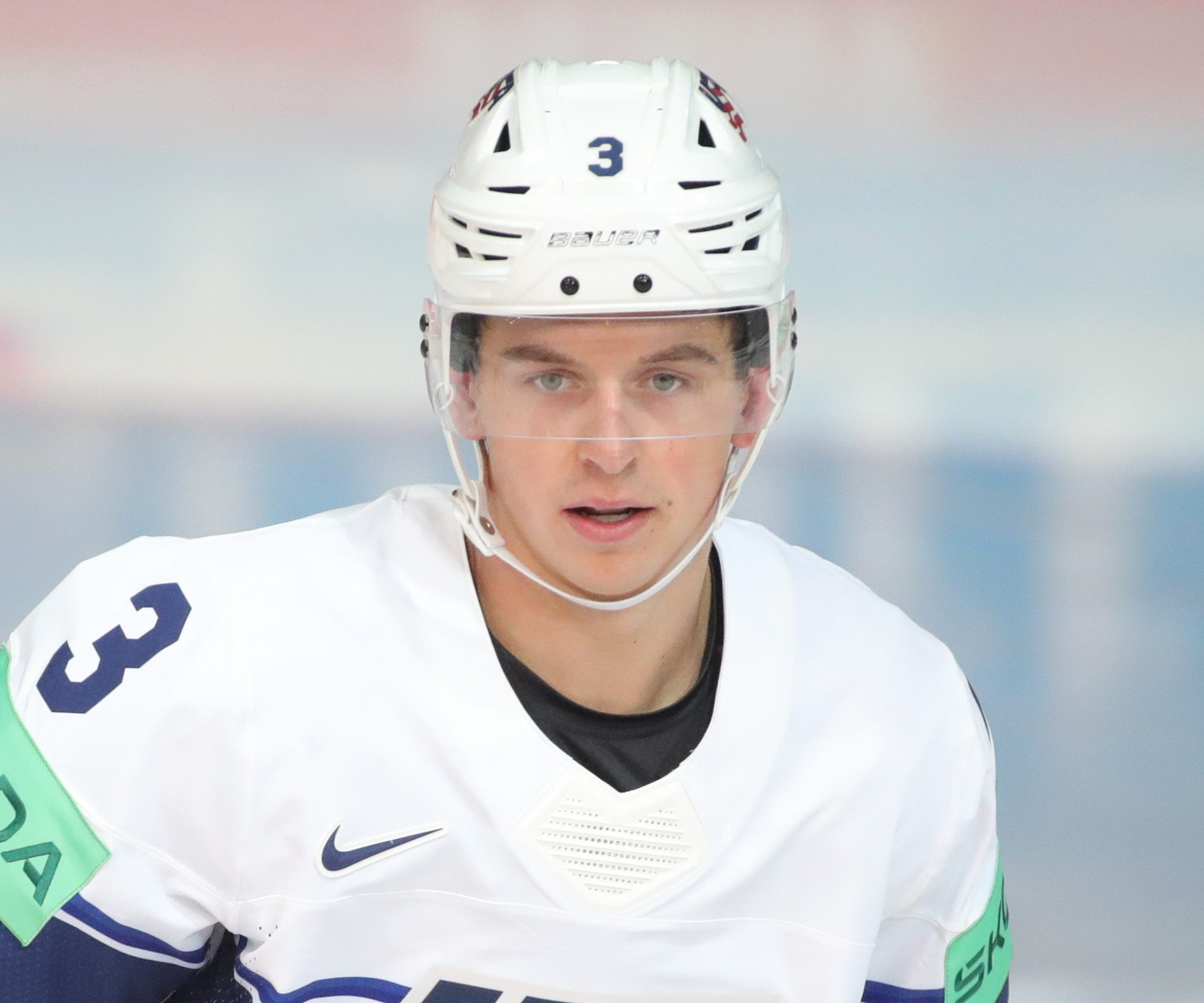
Henry Thrun was selected 101st overall by the Anaheim Ducks.

Aaron Huglen was selected 102nd overall by the Buffalo Sabres.

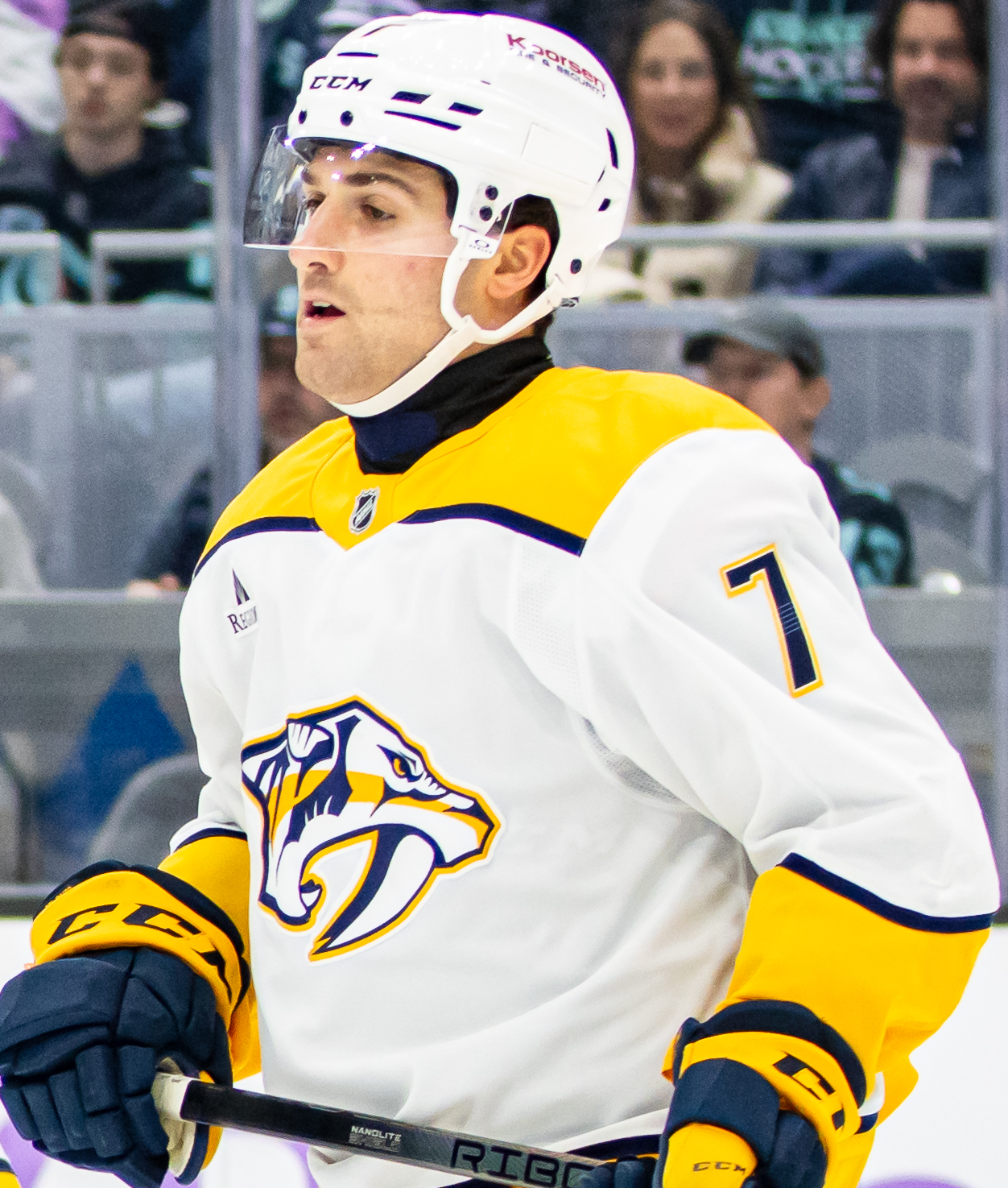
Marc Del Gaizo was selected 109th overall by the Nashville Predators.

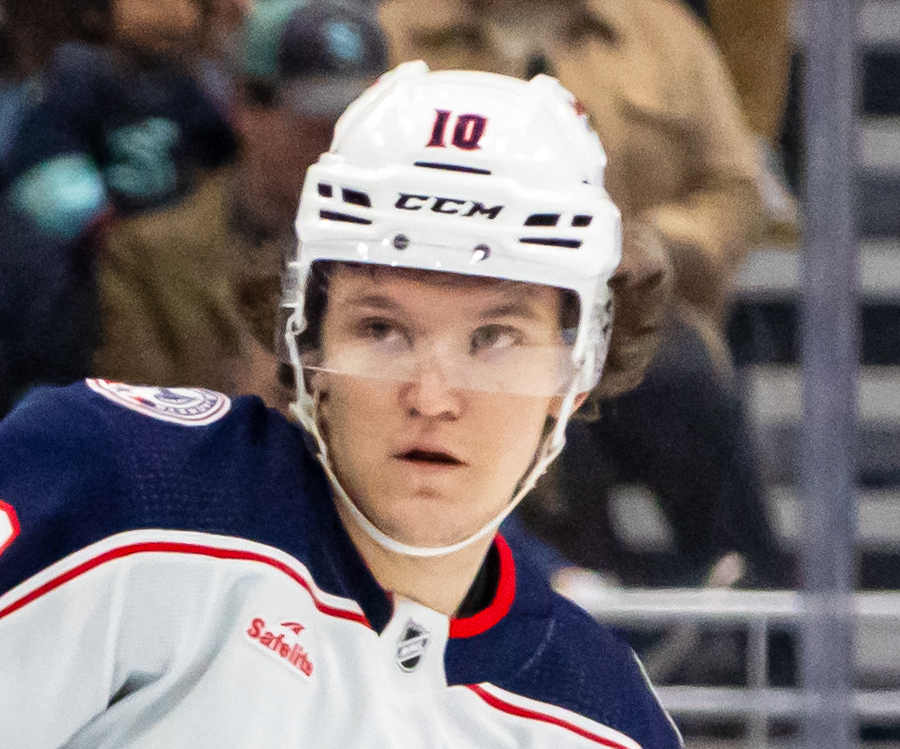
Dmitri Voronkov was selected 114th overall by the Columbus Blue Jackets.

#	Player	Nationality	NHL team	College/junior/club team
94	Viktor Lodin (C)	Sweden	Ottawa Senators	Örebro HK (SHL)
95	Jordan Spence (D)	Canada	Los Angeles Kings	Moncton Wildcats (QMJHL)
96	Tyce Thompson (RW)	United States	New Jersey Devils	Dubuque Fighting Saints (USHL)
97	Ethan Phillips (C)	Canada	Detroit Red Wings	Sioux Falls Stampede (USHL)
98	Matias Maccelli (LW)	Finland	Arizona Coyotes (from Buffalo via Pittsburgh)^{1}	Dubuque Fighting Saints (USHL)
99	Cade Webber (D)	United States	Carolina Hurricanes (from NY Rangers via Boston and Minnesota)^{2}	Rivers School (USHS)
100	Matej Blumel (RW)	Czech Republic	Edmonton Oilers	Waterloo Black Hawks (USHL)
101	Henry Thrun (D)	United States	Anaheim Ducks	U.S. NTDP (USHL)
102	Aaron Huglen (D)	United States	Buffalo Sabres (from Vancouver)^{3}	Fargo Force (USHL)
103	Mason Millman (D)	Canada	Philadelphia Flyers	Saginaw Spirit (OHL)
104	Eric Hjorth (D)	Sweden	Columbus Blue Jackets (from Minnesota via Arizona, Pittsburgh, Dallas, Pittsburgh and Florida)^{4}	Linköpings Jr. (J20 SuperElit)
105	Michal Teply (LW)	Czech Republic	Chicago Blackhawks	HC Bílí Tygři Liberec (Czech Extraliga)
106	Carter Berger (D)	Canada	Florida Panthers	Victoria Grizzlies (BCHL)
107	Alexandr Darin (RW)	Russia	Arizona Coyotes	Loko Yaroslavl (MHL)
108	Yegor Spiridonov (C)	Russia	San Jose Sharks (from Montreal)^{5}	Stalnye Lisy (MHL)
109	Marc Del Gaizo (D)	United States	Nashville Predators (from Colorado)^{6}	U. of Massachusetts Amherst (Hockey East)
110	Ryder Donovan (C)	United States	Vegas Golden Knights	Dubuque Fighting Saints (USHL)
111	Samuel Sjolund (D)	Sweden	Dallas Stars	AIK Jr. (J20 SuperElit)
112	Hunter Skinner (D)	United States	New York Rangers (from Columbus)^{7}	Lincoln Stars (USHL)
113	Henri Nikkanen (C)	Finland	Winnipeg Jets	Jukurit (Liiga)
114	Dmitri Voronkov (LW)	Russia	Columbus Blue Jackets (from Pittsburgh via Florida)^{8}	JHC Bars (VHL)
115	Mikhail Abramov (C)	Russia	Toronto Maple Leafs	Victoriaville Tigres (QMJHL)
116	Lucas Feuk (LW)	Sweden	Calgary Flames (from NY Islanders)^{9}	Södertälje SK (HockeyAllsvenskan)
117	Semyon Chystyakov (D)	Russia	Nashville Predators	Tolpar Ufa (MHL)
118	Case McCarthy (D)	United States	New Jersey Devils (from Washington)^{10}	U.S. NTDP (USHL)
119	Kim Nousiainen (D)	Finland	Los Angeles Kings (from Calgary via Montreal)^{11}	KalPa (Liiga)
120	Max Crozier (D)	Canada	Tampa Bay Lightning	Sioux Falls Stampede (USHL)
121	Tuukka Tieksola (RW)	Finland	Carolina Hurricanes	Kärpät U20 (Jr. A)
122	Ethan Keppen (LW)	Canada	Vancouver Canucks (from San Jose via Buffalo)^{12}	Flint Firebirds (OHL)
123	Antti Saarela (C)	Finland	Chicago Blackhawks (from Boston)^{13}	Lukko (Liiga)
124	Nicholas Abruzzese (C)	United States	Toronto Maple Leafs (from St. Louis)^{14}	Chicago Steel (USHL)

Notes

1. The Buffalo Sabres' fourth-round pick went to the Arizona Coyotes as the result of a trade on June 22, 2019, that sent Chicago's third-round pick in 2019 (74th overall) to Pittsburgh in exchange for Tampa Bay's fifth-round pick and a seventh-round pick both in 2019 (151st and 207th overall) and this pick.
  Pittsburgh previously acquired this pick as the result of a trade on June 27, 2018, that sent Conor Sheary and Matt Hunwick to Buffalo in exchange for this pick (being conditional at the time of the trade). The condition – Pittsburgh will receive a fourth-round pick in 2019 if Buffalo does not trade away Hunwick before the 2019 NHL draft or if Sheary does not get 20 goals or 40 points during the 2018–19 NHL season – was converted on June 22, 2019.
2. The New York Rangers' fourth-round pick went to the Carolina Hurricanes as the result of a trade on June 22, 2019, that sent a second-round pick in 2019 (59th overall) to Minnesota in exchange for a third-round pick in 2019 (73rd overall) and this pick.
  Minnesota previously acquired this pick as the result of a trade on February 20, 2019, that sent Charlie Coyle to Boston in exchange for Ryan Donato and this pick (being conditional at the time of the trade). The condition – Minnesota will receive the Rangers' fourth-round pick in 2019 if Boston advances to the 2019 Eastern Conference Second Round – was converted on April 23, 2019.
  Boston previously acquired this pick as the result of a trade on September 11, 2018, that sent Adam McQuaid to New York in exchange for Steven Kampfer, a conditional seventh-round pick in 2019 and this pick.
3. The Vancouver Canucks' fourth-round pick went to the Buffalo Sabres as the result of a trade on June 22, 2019, that sent San Jose's fourth-round pick and Winnipeg's sixth-round pick both in 2019 (122nd and 175th overall) to Vancouver in exchange for this pick.
4. The Minnesota Wild's fourth-round pick went to the Columbus Blue Jackets as the result of a trade on June 22, 2019, that sent a third-round pick in 2019 (81st overall) to Florida in exchange for Pittsburgh's fourth-round pick in 2019 (114th overall) and this pick.
  Florida previously acquired this pick as the result of a trade on February 1, 2019, that sent Nick Bjugstad and Jared McCann to Pittsburgh in exchange for Derick Brassard, Riley Sheahan, a second and fourth-round pick both in 2019 and this pick (being conditional at the time of the trade). The condition – Dallas will receive the higher of Minnesota or Pittsburgh's fourth-round picks in 2019 – was converted on April 2, 2019, when Minnesota was eliminated from the 2019 Stanley Cup playoffs.
  Pittsburgh previously acquired this pick as the result of a trade on January 28, 2019, that sent Jamie Oleksiak to Dallas in exchange for this pick.
  Dallas previously acquired this pick as the result of a trade on December 19, 2017, that sent Jamie Oleksiak to Pittsburgh in exchange for this pick.
  Pittsburgh previously acquired this pick as the result of a trade on December 19, 2017, that sent Josh Archibald, Sean Maguire and a sixth-round pick in 2019 to Arizona in exchange for Michael Leighton and this pick.
  Arizona previously acquired this pick as the result of a trade on February 26, 2017, that sent Martin Hanzal, Ryan White and a fourth-round pick in 2017 to Minnesota in exchange for Grayson Downing, a first-round pick in 2017, a second-round pick in 2018 and this pick (being conditional at the time of the trade). The condition – Arizona will receive a fourth-round pick in 2019 if Minnesota does not advance past the First Round of the 2017 Stanley Cup playoffs – was converted on April 22, 2017.
5. The Montreal Canadiens' fourth-round pick went to the San Jose Sharks as the result of a trade on June 22, 2019, that sent a fourth-round pick in 2020 to Montreal in exchange for this pick.
6. The Colorado Avalanche's fourth-round pick went to the Nashville Predators as the result of a trade on July 1, 2017, that sent Colin Wilson to Colorado in exchange for this pick.
7. The Columbus Blue Jackets' fourth-round pick went to the New York Rangers as the result of a trade on February 25, 2019, that sent Adam McQuaid to Columbus in exchange for Julius Bergman, a seventh-round pick in 2019 and this pick.
8. The Pittsburgh Penguins' fourth-round pick went to the Columbus Blue Jackets as the result of a trade on June 22, 2019, that sent a third-round pick in 2019 (81st overall) to Florida in exchange for Minnesota's fourth-round pick in 2019 (104th overall) and this pick.
  Florida previously acquired this pick as the result of a trade on February 1, 2019, that sent Nick Bjugstad and Jared McCann to Pittsburgh in exchange for Derick Brassard, Riley Sheahan, a second-round pick in 2019, Minnesota's fourth-round pick in 2019 and this pick.
9. The New York Islanders' fourth-round pick went to the Calgary Flames as the result of a trade on June 24, 2017, that sent a first and second-round pick in 2018 and a conditional second-round pick in 2019 to New York in exchange for Travis Hamonic and this pick. The condition – Calgary will receive a fourth-round pick in 2019 if their second-round pick in 2019 transfers to the New York Islanders – was converted on March 26, 2018.
10. The Washington Capitals' fourth-round pick went to the New Jersey Devils as the result of a trade on June 22, 2019, that sent San Jose's third-round pick in 2019 (91st overall) to Washington in exchange for Buffalo's fifth-round pick in 2019 (129th overall) and this pick.
11. The Calgary Flames' fourth-round pick went to the Los Angeles Kings as the result of a trade on February 11, 2019, that sent Nate Thompson and Arizona's fifth-round pick in 2019 to Montreal in exchange for this pick.
  Montreal previously acquired this pick as the result of a trade on June 23, 2018, that sent Winnipeg's fourth-round pick in 2018 to Calgary in exchange for this pick.
12. The San Jose Sharks' fourth-round pick went to the Vancouver Canucks as the result of a trade on June 22, 2019, that sent a fourth-round pick in 2019 (102nd overall) to Buffalo in exchange for Winnipeg's sixth-round pick in 2019 (175th overall) and this pick.
  Buffalo previously acquired this pick as the result of a trade on February 26, 2018, that sent Evander Kane to San Jose in exchange for Danny O'Regan, a conditional first-round pick in 2019 and this pick (being conditional at the time of the trade). The condition – Buffalo will receive a fourth-round pick in 2019, at San Jose's choice – was converted on June 22, 2019.
13. The Boston Bruins' fourth-round pick went to the Chicago Blackhawks as the result of a trade on February 26, 2018, that sent Tommy Wingels to Boston in exchange for this pick (being conditional at the time of the trade). The condition – Chicago will receive a fourth-round pick in 2019 if Boston advances to the 2018 Second Round – was converted on April 25, 2018.
14. The St. Louis Blues' fourth-round pick went to the Toronto Maple Leafs as the result of a trade on February 15, 2018, that sent Nikita Soshnikov to St. Louis in exchange for this pick.

=== Round five ===
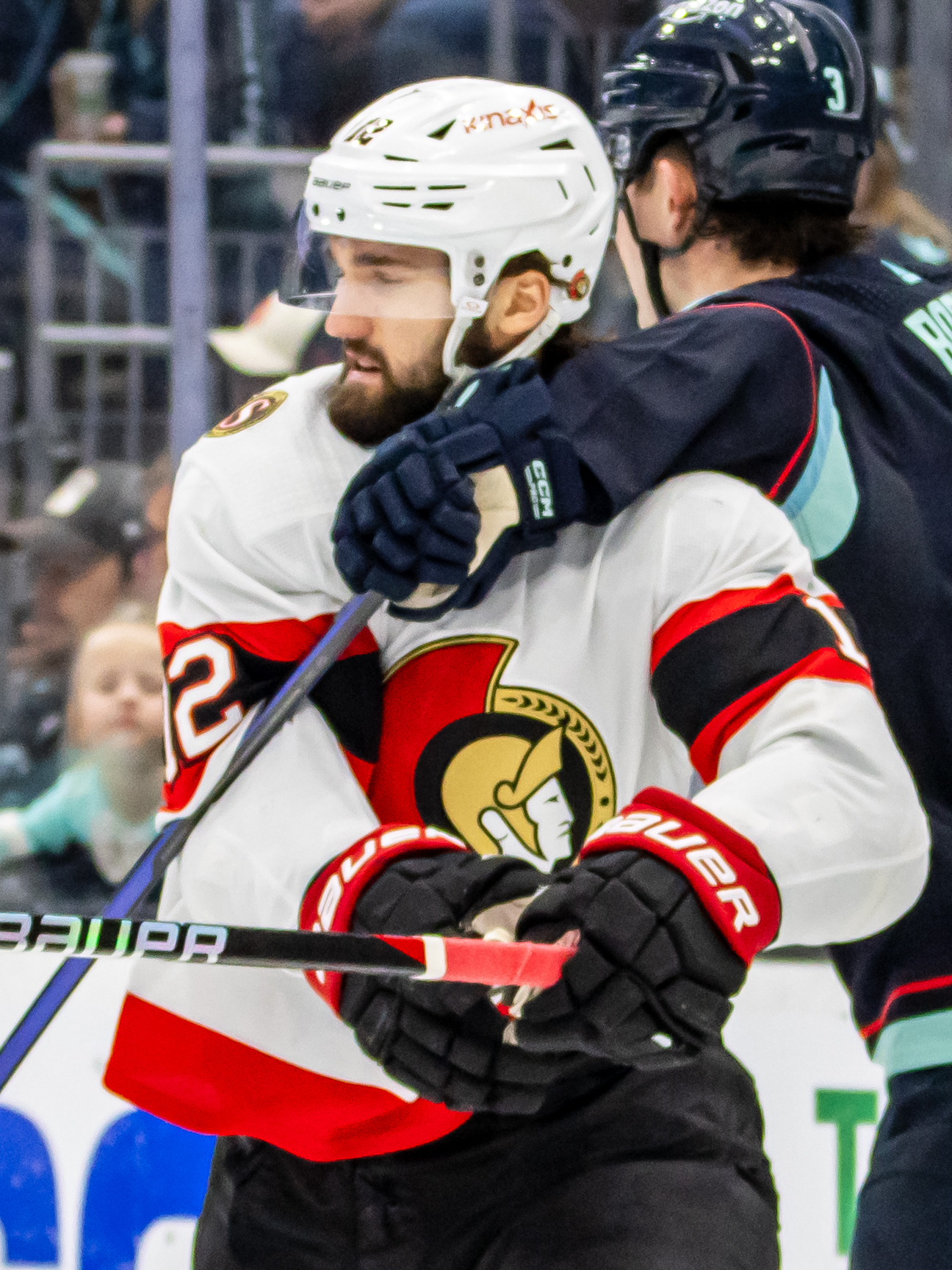
Mark Kastelic was selected 125th overall by the Ottawa Senators.

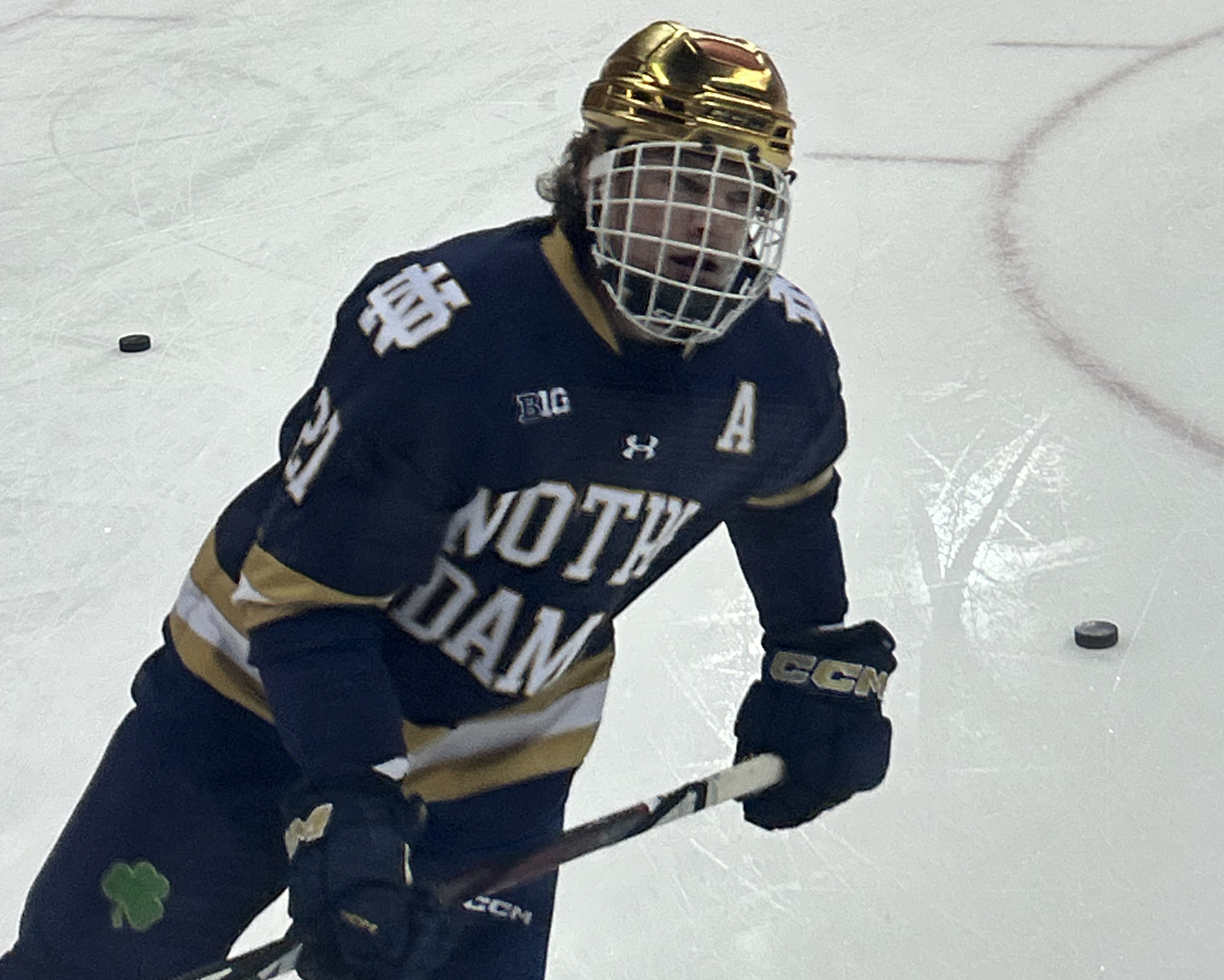
Trevor Janicke was selected 132rd overall by the Anaheim Ducks.

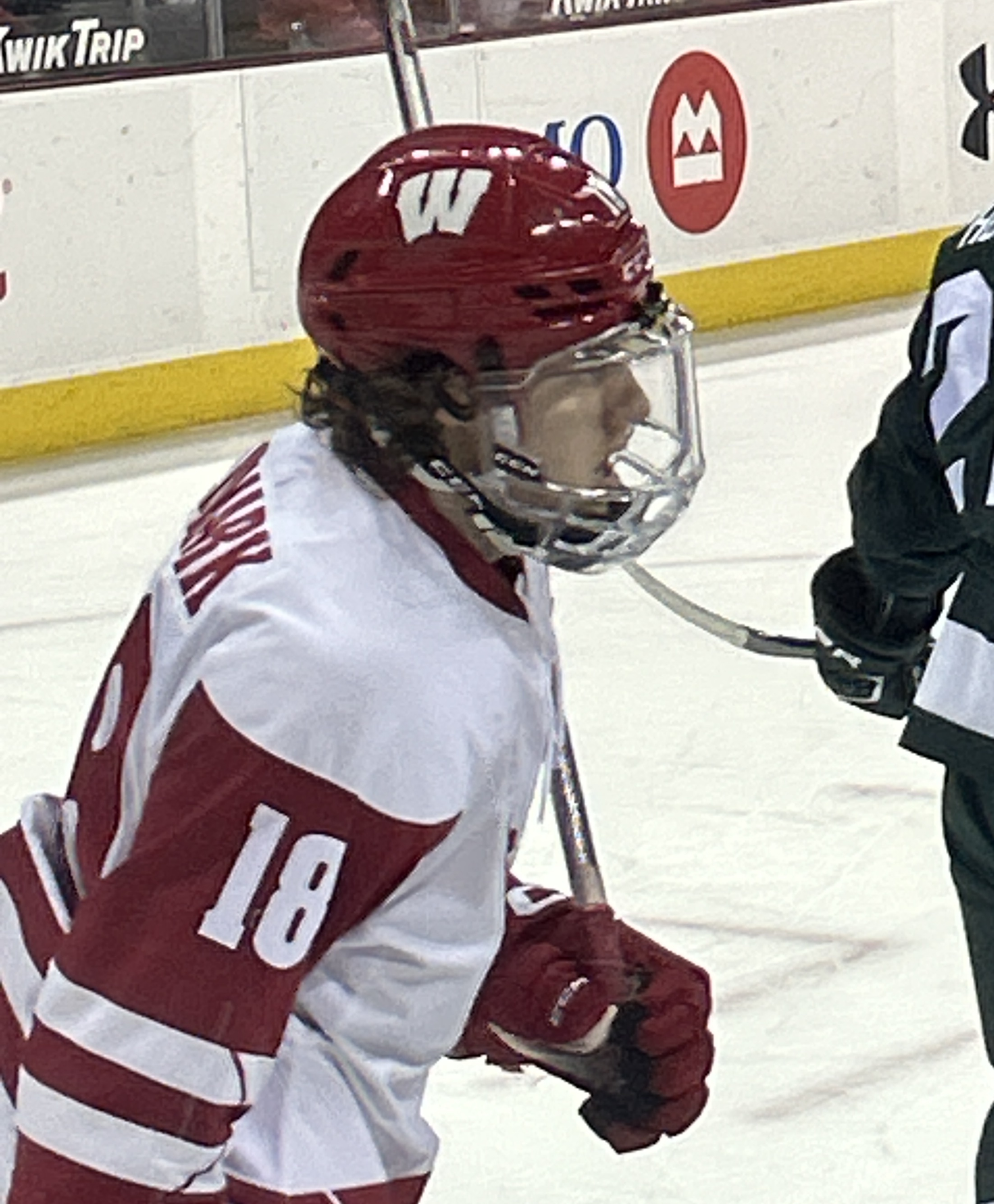
Owen Lindmark was selected 137th overall by the Florida Panthers.

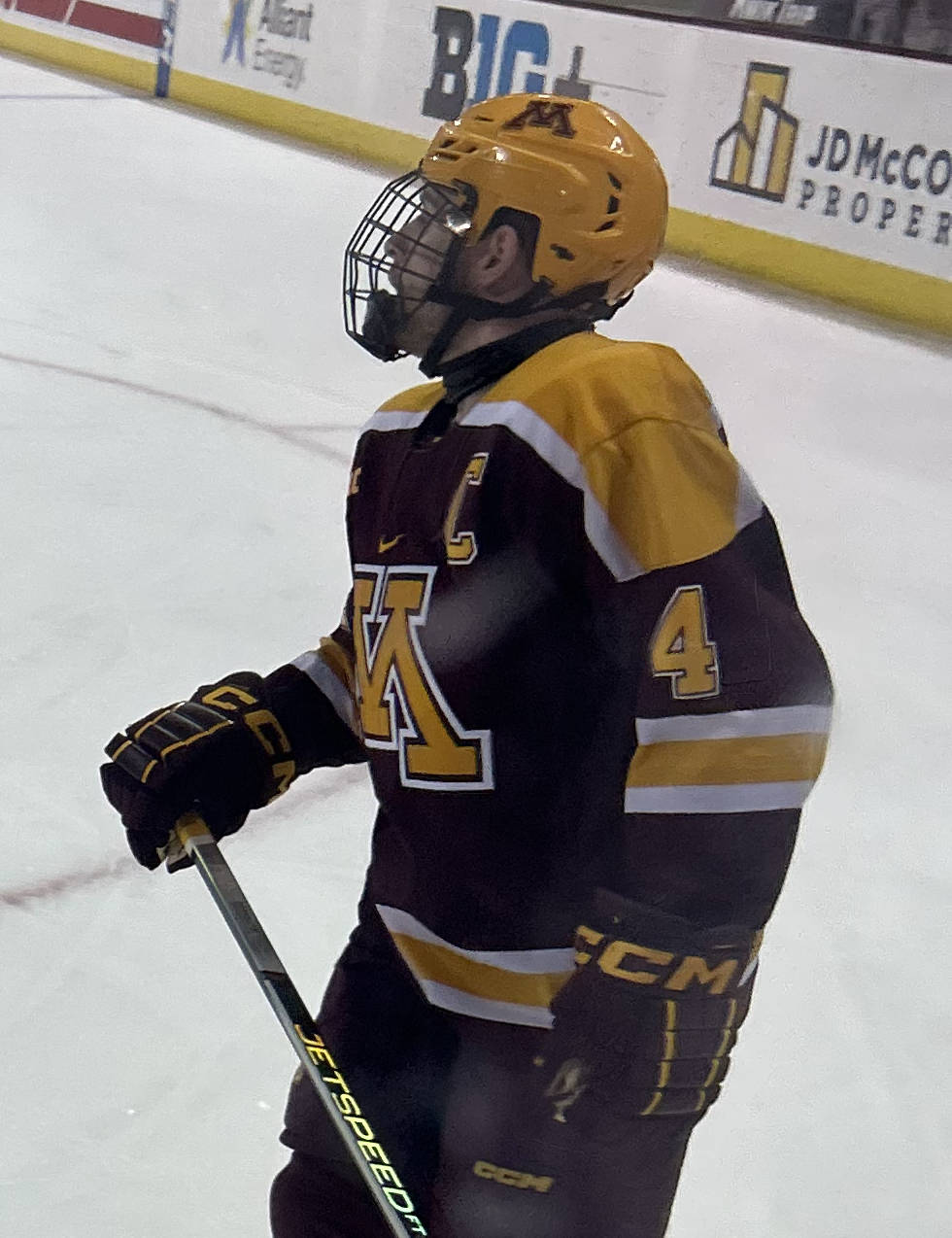
Michael Koster was selected 146th overall by the Toronto Maple Leafs.

#	Player	Nationality	NHL team	College/junior/club team
125	Mark Kastelic (C)	United States	Ottawa Senators	Calgary Hitmen (WHL)
126	Jacob LeGuerrier (D)	Canada	Montreal Canadiens (from Los Angeles)^{1}	Sault Ste. Marie Greyhounds (OHL)
127	Cole Brady (G)	Canada	New Jersey Devils	Janesville Jets (NAHL)
128	Cooper Moore (D)	United States	Detroit Red Wings	Brunswick Prep (USHS)
129	Arseni Gritsyuk (LW)	Russia	New Jersey Devils (from Buffalo via Detroit and Washington)^{2}	Omskie Yastreby (MHL)
130	Leevi Aaltonen (RW)	Finland	New York Rangers	KalPa (Liiga)
131	Rhett Pitlick (LW)	United States	Montreal Canadiens (from Edmonton)^{3}	Chaska (USHS)
132	Trevor Janicke (C)	United States	Anaheim Ducks	Central Illinois Flying Aces (USHL)
133	Carson Focht (C)	Canada	Vancouver Canucks	Calgary Hitman (WHL)
134	Harrison Blaisdell (C)	Canada	Winnipeg Jets (from Philadelphia)^{4}	Chilliwack Chiefs (BCHL)
135	Isaiah Saville (G)	United States	Vegas Golden Knights (from Minnesota)^{5}	Tri-City Storm (USHL)
136	Henrik Rybinski (RW)	Canada	Florida Panthers (from Chicago via Montreal)^{6}	Seattle Thunderbirds (WHL)
137	Owen Lindmark (C)	United States	Florida Panthers	U.S. NTDP (USHL)
138	Frederik Nissen Dichow (G)	Denmark	Montreal Canadiens (from Arizona via Chicago and Los Angeles)^{7}	Vojens IK (1. Division)
139	Marcus Kallionkieli (LW)	Finland	Vegas Golden Knights (from Montreal)^{8}	Sioux City Musketeers (USHL)
140	Sasha Mutala (RW)	Canada	Colorado Avalanche	Tri-City Americans (WHL)
141	Mason Primeau (C)	Canada	Vegas Golden Knights	North Bay Battalion (OHL)
142	Nicholas Porco (LW)	Canada	Dallas Stars	Saginaw Spirit (OHL)
143	Filip Cederqvist (LW)	Sweden	Buffalo Sabres (from Columbus via Detroit)^{9}	Växjö Lakers (SHL)
144	Logan Neaton (G)	United States	Winnipeg Jets	Prince George Spruce Kings (BCHL)
145	Judd Caulfield (RW)	United States	Pittsburgh Penguins	U.S. NTDP (USHL)
146	Michael Koster (D)	United States	Toronto Maple Leafs	Chaska (USHS)
147	Reece Newkirk (C)	Canada	New York Islanders	Portland Winterhawks (WHL)
148	Ethan Haider (G)	United States	Nashville Predators	Minnesota Magicians (NAHL)
149	Matvey Guskov (C)	Russia	Minnesota Wild (from Washington via Montreal)^{10}	London Knights (OHL)
150	Joshua Nodler (C)	United States	Calgary Flames	Fargo Force (USHL)
151	Aku Räty (RW)	Finland	Arizona Coyotes (from Tampa Bay via Chicago and Pittsburgh)^{11}	Kärpät U20 (Jr. A)
152	Kirill Slepets (RW)	Russia	Carolina Hurricanes	Lokomotiv Yaroslavl (KHL)
153	Martin Has (D)	Czech Republic	Washington Capitals (from San Jose)^{12}	Tappara U20 (Jr. A)
154	Roman Bychkov (D)	Russia	Boston Bruins	Loko Yaroslavl (MHL)
155	Keean Washkurak (C)	Canada	St. Louis Blues	Mississauga Steelheads (OHL)

Notes

1. The Los Angeles Kings' fifth-round pick went to the Montreal Canadiens as the result of a trade on June 22, 2019, that sent Columbus' second-round pick in 2019 (50th overall) to Los Angeles in exchange for a third-round pick in 2019 (64th overall) and this pick.
2. The Buffalo Sabres' fifth-round pick went to the New Jersey Devils as the result of a trade on June 22, 2019, that sent San Jose's third-round pick in 2019 (91st overall) to Washington in exchange for a fourth-round pick in 2019 (118th overall) and this pick.
  Washington previously acquired this pick as the result of a trade on February 22, 2019, that sent Madison Bowey and a second-round pick in 2020 to Detroit in exchange for Nick Jensen and this pick.
  Detroit previously acquired this pick as the result of a trade on December 4, 2017, that sent Scott Wilson to Buffalo in exchange for this pick.
3. The Edmonton Oilers' fifth-round pick went to the Montreal Canadiens as the result of a trade on June 23, 2018, that sent Hayden Hawkey to Edmonton in exchange for this pick.
4. The Philadelphia Flyers' fifth-round pick went to the Winnipeg Jets as a result of a trade on June 3, 2019, that sent Kevin Hayes to Philadelphia in exchange for this pick.
5. The Minnesota Wild's fifth-round pick went to the Vegas Golden Knights as the result of a trade on January 21, 2019, that sent Brad Hunt and a sixth-round pick in 2019 to Minnesota in exchange for this pick (being conditional at the time of the trade). The condition – Vegas will receive the higher of Minnesota or Washington's fifth-round picks in 2019. – was converted on April 2, 2019, when Minnesota was eliminated from the 2019 Stanley Cup playoffs ensuring that Minnesota would select higher than Washington.
6. The Chicago Blackhawks' fifth-round pick went to the Florida Panthers as the result of a trade on June 22, 2019, that sent a fifth-round pick in 2020 to Montreal in exchange for this pick.
  Montreal previously acquired this pick as the result of a trade on June 23, 2018, that sent Florida's fifth-round pick in 2018 to Chicago in exchange for this pick.
7. The Arizona Coyotes' fifth-round pick went to the Montreal Canadiens as the result of a trade on February 11, 2019, that sent Calgary's fourth-round pick in 2019 to Los Angeles in exchange for Nate Thompson and this pick.
  Los Angeles previously acquired this pick as the result of a trade on January 24, 2019, that sent Dominik Kubalik to Chicago in exchange for this pick.
  Chicago previously acquired this pick as the result of a trade on July 12, 2018, that sent Marian Hossa, Vinnie Hinostroza, Jordan Oesterle and a third-round pick in 2019 to Arizona in exchange for Marcus Kruger, MacKenzie Entwistle, Jordan Maletta, Andrew Campbell and this pick.
8. The Montreal Canadiens' fifth-round pick went to the Vegas Golden Knights as the result of a trade on June 22, 2017, that sent David Schlemko to Montreal in exchange for this pick.
9. The Columbus Blue Jackets' fifth-round pick went to the Buffalo Sabres as the result of a trade on June 22, 2019, that sent Toronto's sixth-round pick and a seventh-round both in 2019 (177th and 191st overall) to Detroit in exchange for this pick.
  Detroit previously acquired this pick as the result of a trade on June 23, 2018, that sent Montreal's sixth-round pick in 2018 to Columbus in exchange for this pick.
10. The Washington Capitals' fifth-round pick went to the Minnesota Wild as the result of a trade on February 26, 2018, that sent Mike Reilly to Montreal in exchange for this pick.
  Montreal previously acquired this pick as the result of a trade on February 21, 2018, that sent Jakub Jerabek to Washington in exchange for this pick.
11. The Tampa Bay Lightning's fifth-round pick went to the Arizona Coyotes as the result of a trade on June 22, 2019, that sent Chicago's third-round pick in 2019 (74th overall) to Pittsburgh in exchange for Buffalo's fourth-round pick and a seventh-round pick both in 2019 (98th and 207th overall) and this pick.
  Pittsburgh previously acquired this pick as the result of a trade on June 15, 2019, that sent Olli Maatta to Chicago in exchange for Dominik Kahun and this pick.
  Chicago previously acquired this pick as the result of a trade on January 11, 2019, that sent Jan Rutta and a seventh-round pick in 2019 to Tampa Bay in exchange for Slater Koekkoek and this pick.
12. The San Jose Sharks' fifth-round pick went to the Washington Capitals as the result of a trade on June 22, 2019, that sent a seventh-round pick in 2019 (211th overall) and 2020 to San Jose in exchange for this pick.

=== Round six ===
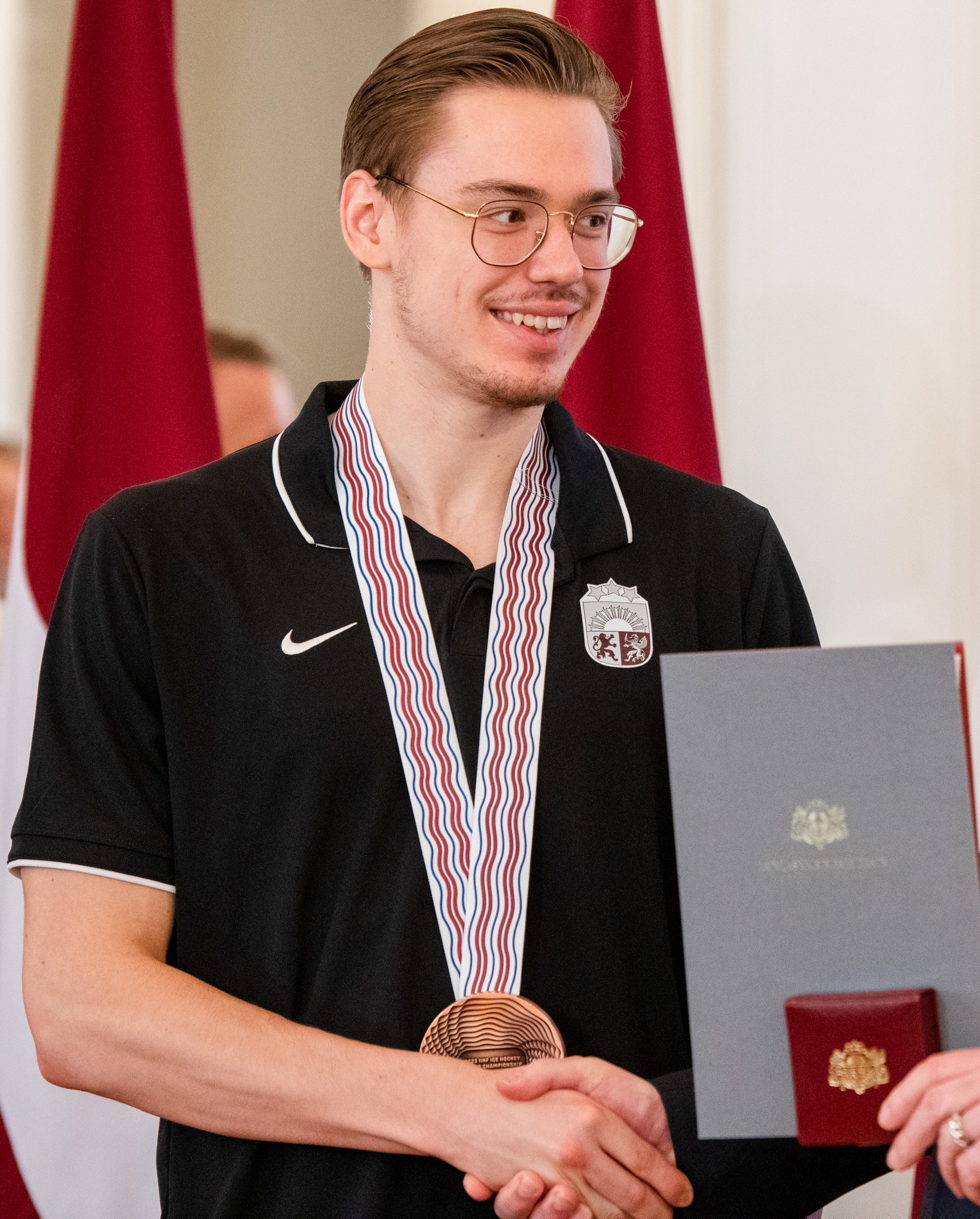
Arturs Silovs was selected 156th overall by the Vancouver Canucks.

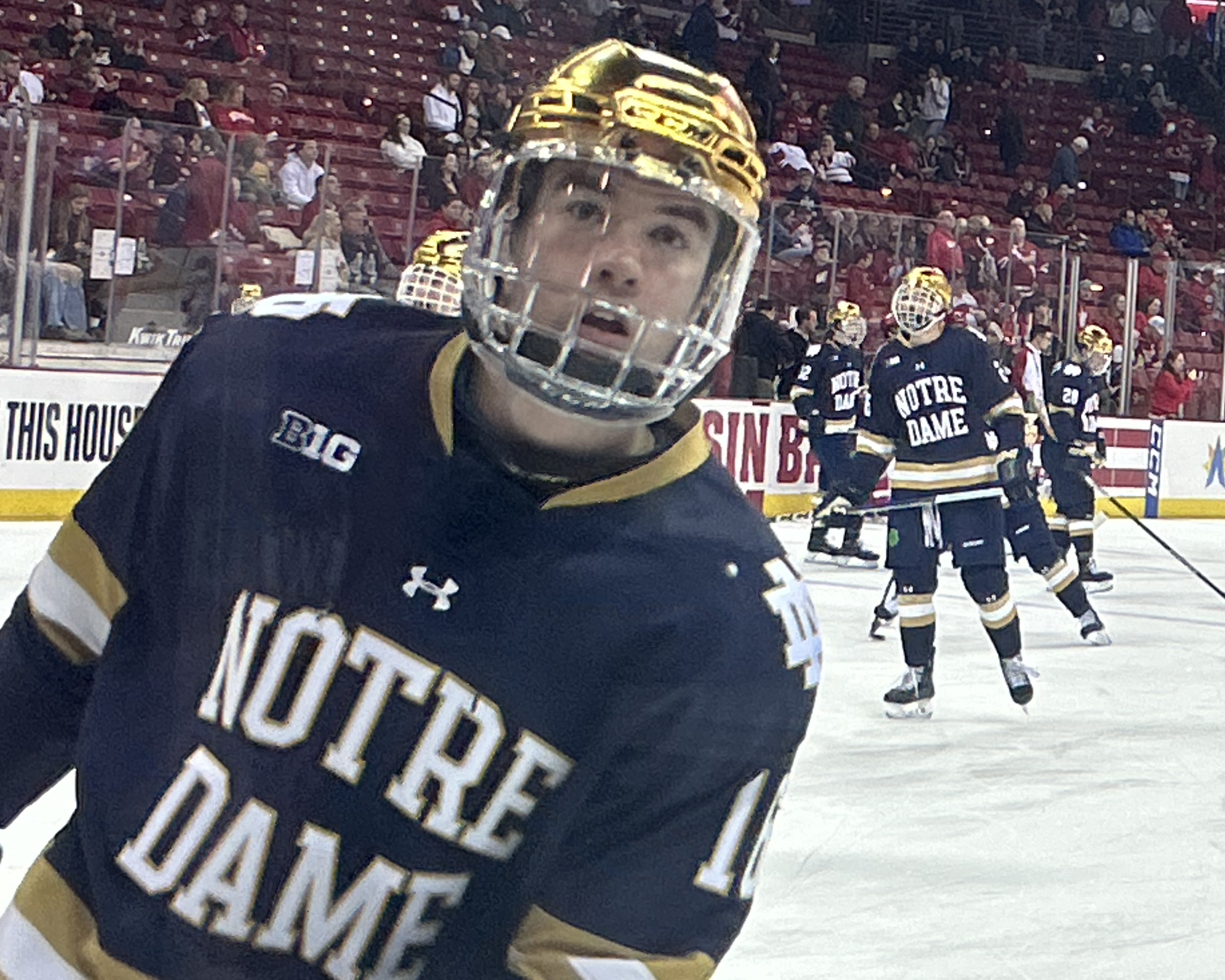
Patrick Moynihan was selected 158th overall by the New Jersey Devils.

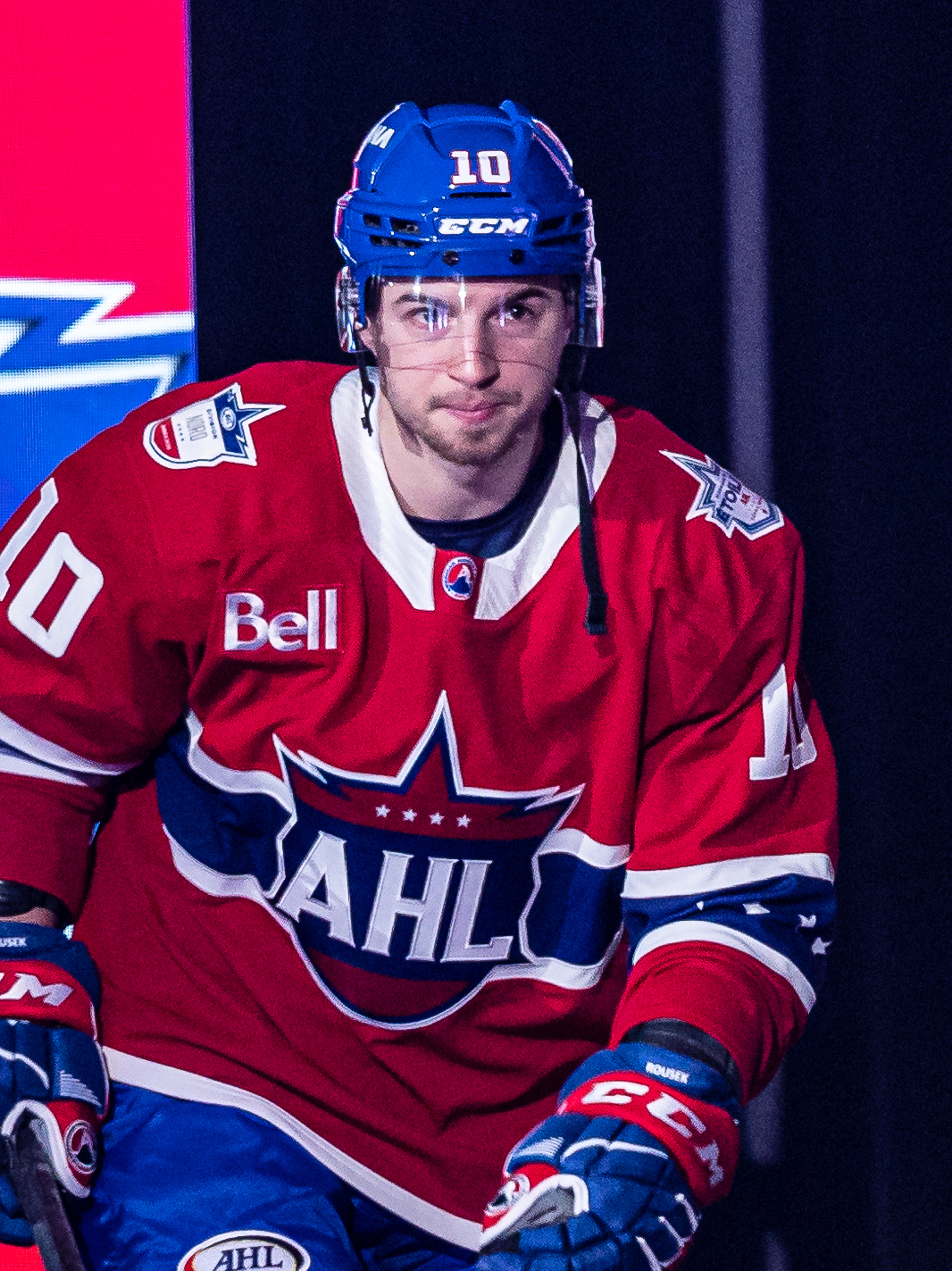
Lukas Rousek was selected 160th overall by the Buffalo Sabres.

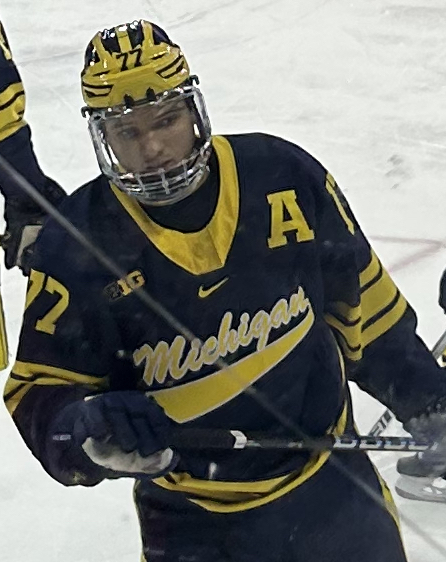
Marshall Warren was selected 166th overall by the Minnesota Wild.

Dominic Basse was selected 167th overall by the Chicago Blackhawks.

#	Player	Nationality	NHL team	College/junior/club team
156	Arturs Silovs (G)	Latvia	Vancouver Canucks (from Ottawa)^{1}	HK Riga (MHL)
157	Braden Doyle (D)	United States	Los Angeles Kings	Lawrence Academy (USHS)
158	Patrick Moynihan (RW)	United States	New Jersey Devils	U.S. NTDP (USHL)
159	Elmer Soderblom (RW)	Sweden	Detroit Red Wings	Frölunda Jr. (J20 SuperElit)
160	Lukas Rousek (RW)	Czech Republic	Buffalo Sabres	Sparta Prague (Czech Extraliga)
161	Adam Edstrom (C)	Sweden	New York Rangers	Mora IK (SHL)
162	Tomas Mazura (C)	Czech Republic	Edmonton Oilers	Kimball Union Academy (USHS)
163	William Francis (D)	United States	Anaheim Ducks	Cedar Rapids RoughRiders (USHL)
164	Timur Ibragimov (LW)	Russia	San Jose Sharks (from Vancouver)^{2}	SKA-1946 (MHL)
165	Egor Serdyuk (RW)	Russia	Philadelphia Flyers	Victoriaville Tigres (QMJHL)
166	Marshall Warren (D)	United States	Minnesota Wild	U.S. NTDP (USHL)
167	Dominic Basse (G)	United States	Chicago Blackhawks	South Kent School (USHS)
168	Greg Meireles (C)	Canada	Florida Panthers	Kitchener Rangers (OHL)
169	Roddy Ross (G)	Canada	Philadelphia Flyers (from Arizona)^{3}	Seattle Thunderbirds (WHL)
170	Arsen Khisamutdinov (C)	Russia	Montreal Canadiens	JHC Reaktor (MHL)
171	Luka Burzan (RW)	Canada	Colorado Avalanche	Brandon Wheat Kings (WHL)
172	Nikita Nesterenko (C)	United States	Minnesota Wild (from Vegas)^{4}	Lawrenceville School (USHS)
173	Benjamin Brinkman (D)	United States	Dallas Stars	U. of Minnesota (Big Ten)
174	Danil Savunov (LW)	Russia	Arizona Coyotes (from Columbus)^{5}	Dizel Penza (VHL)
175	Karel Plasek (RW)	Czech Republic	Vancouver Canucks (from Winnipeg via Buffalo)^{6}	HC Kometa Brno (Czech Extraliga)
176	Anthony Romano (C)	Canada	Arizona Coyotes (from Pittsburgh)^{7}	Sioux Falls Stampede (USHL)
177	Gustav Berglund (D)	Sweden	Detroit Red Wings (from Toronto via Buffalo)^{8}	Frölunda Jr. (J20 SuperElit)
178	Felix Bibeau (C)	Canada	New York Islanders	Rouyn-Noranda Huskies (QMJHL)
179	Isak Walther (RW)	Sweden	Nashville Predators	Södertälje Jr. (J20 SuperElit)
180	Jack Malone (RW)	United States	Vancouver Canucks (from Washington)^{9}	Youngstown Phantoms (USHL)
181	Kevin Wall (RW)	United States	Carolina Hurricanes (from Calgary)^{10}	Chilliwack Chiefs (BCHL)
182	Quinn Schmiemann (D)	Canada	Tampa Bay Lightning	Kamloops Blazers (WHL)
183	Blake Murray (C)	Canada	Carolina Hurricanes	Sudbury Wolves (OHL)
184	Santeri Hatakka (D)	Finland	San Jose Sharks	Jokerit U20 (Jr. A)
185	Matias Mantykivi (C)	Finland	Boston Bruins	SaiPa U20 (Jr. A)
186	Mathew Hill (D)	Canada	Anaheim Ducks (from St. Louis)^{11}	Barrie Colts (OHL)

Notes

1. The Ottawa Senators' sixth-round pick went to the Vancouver Canucks as the result of a trade on January 2, 2019, that sent Anders Nilsson and Darren Archibald to Ottawa in exchange for Mike McKenna, Tom Pyatt and this pick.
2. The Vancouver Canucks' sixth-round pick went to the San Jose Sharks as the result of a trade on June 22, 2019, that sent Francis Perron and a seventh-round pick in 2019 (215th overall) to Vancouver in exchange for Tom Pyatt and this pick.
3. The Arizona Coyotes' sixth-round pick went to the Philadelphia Flyers as the result of a trade on January 11, 2019, that sent Jordan Weal to Arizona in exchange for Jacob Graves and this pick.
4. The Vegas Golden Knights' sixth-round pick went to the Minnesota Wild as the result of a trade on January 21, 2019, that sent a conditional fifth-round pick in 2019 to Vegas in exchange for Brad Hunt and this pick.
5. The Columbus Blue Jackets' sixth-round pick went to the Arizona Coyotes as the result of a trade on July 18, 2018, that sent Ryan MacInnis to Columbus in exchange for Jacob Graves and this pick (being conditional at the time of the trade). The condition – Arizona will receive a sixth-round pick in 2019 if MacInnis plays in less than 20 games during the 2018–19 NHL season – was converted on February 28, 2019.
6. The Winnipeg Jets' sixth-round pick went to the Vancouver Canucks as the result of a trade on June 22, 2019, that sent a fourth-round pick in 2019 (102nd overall) to Buffalo in exchange for San Jose's fourth-round pick in 2019 (122nd overall) and this pick.
  Buffalo previously acquired this pick as the result of a trade on February 25, 2019, that sent Nathan Beaulieu to Winnipeg in exchange for this pick.
7. The Pittsburgh Penguins' sixth-round pick went to the Arizona Coyotes as the result of a trade on December 19, 2017, that sent Michael Leighton and a fourth-round pick in 2019 to Pittsburgh in exchange for Josh Archibald, Sean Maguire and this pick.
8. The Toronto Maple Leafs' sixth-round pick went to the Detroit Red Wings as the result of a trade on June 22, 2019, that sent Columbus' fifth-round pick in 2019 (143rd overall) to Buffalo in exchange for a seventh-round pick in 2019 (191st overall) and this pick.
  Buffalo previously acquired this pick as the result of a trade on June 23, 2018, that sent a sixth-round pick in 2018 to Toronto in exchange for this pick.
9. The Washington Capitals' sixth-round pick went to the Vancouver Canucks as the result of a trade on June 23, 2018, that sent a sixth-round pick in 2018 to Washington in exchange for a sixth-round pick in 2018 and this pick.
10. The Calgary Flames' sixth-round pick went to the Carolina Hurricanes as the result of a trade on June 29, 2017, that sent Eddie Lack, Ryan Murphy and a seventh-round pick in 2019 to Calgary in exchange for Keegan Kanzig and this pick.
11. The St. Louis Blues' sixth-round pick went to the Anaheim Ducks as the result of a trade on February 25, 2019, that sent Michael Del Zotto to St. Louis in exchange for this pick.

=== Round seven ===
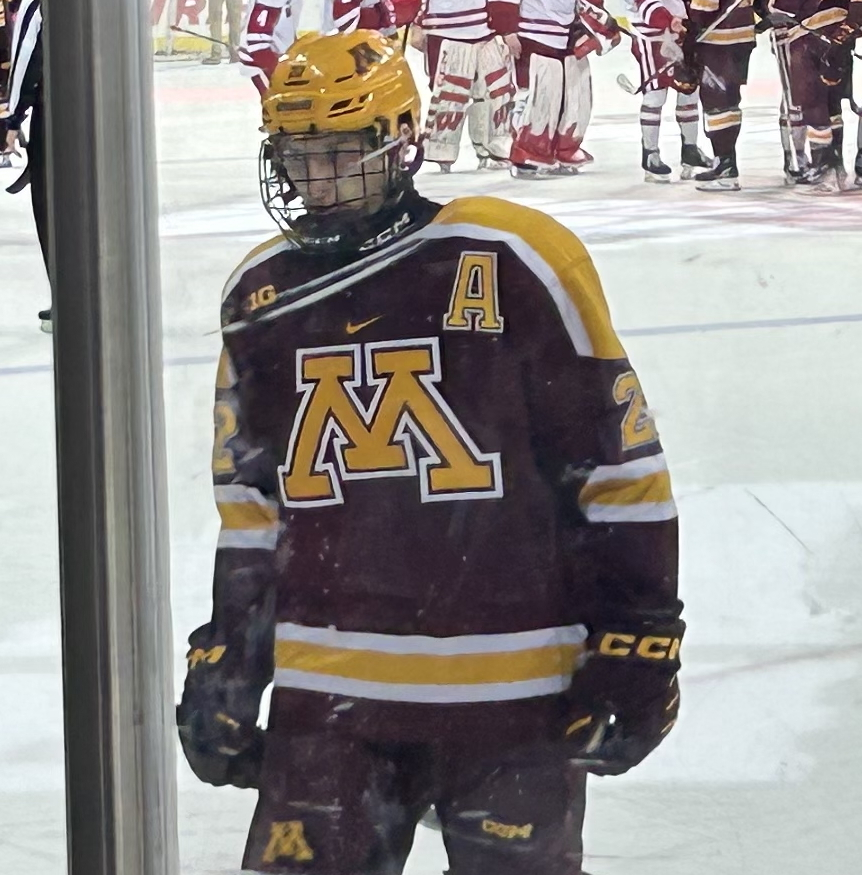
Bryce Brodzinski was selected 196th overall by the Philadelphia Flyers.

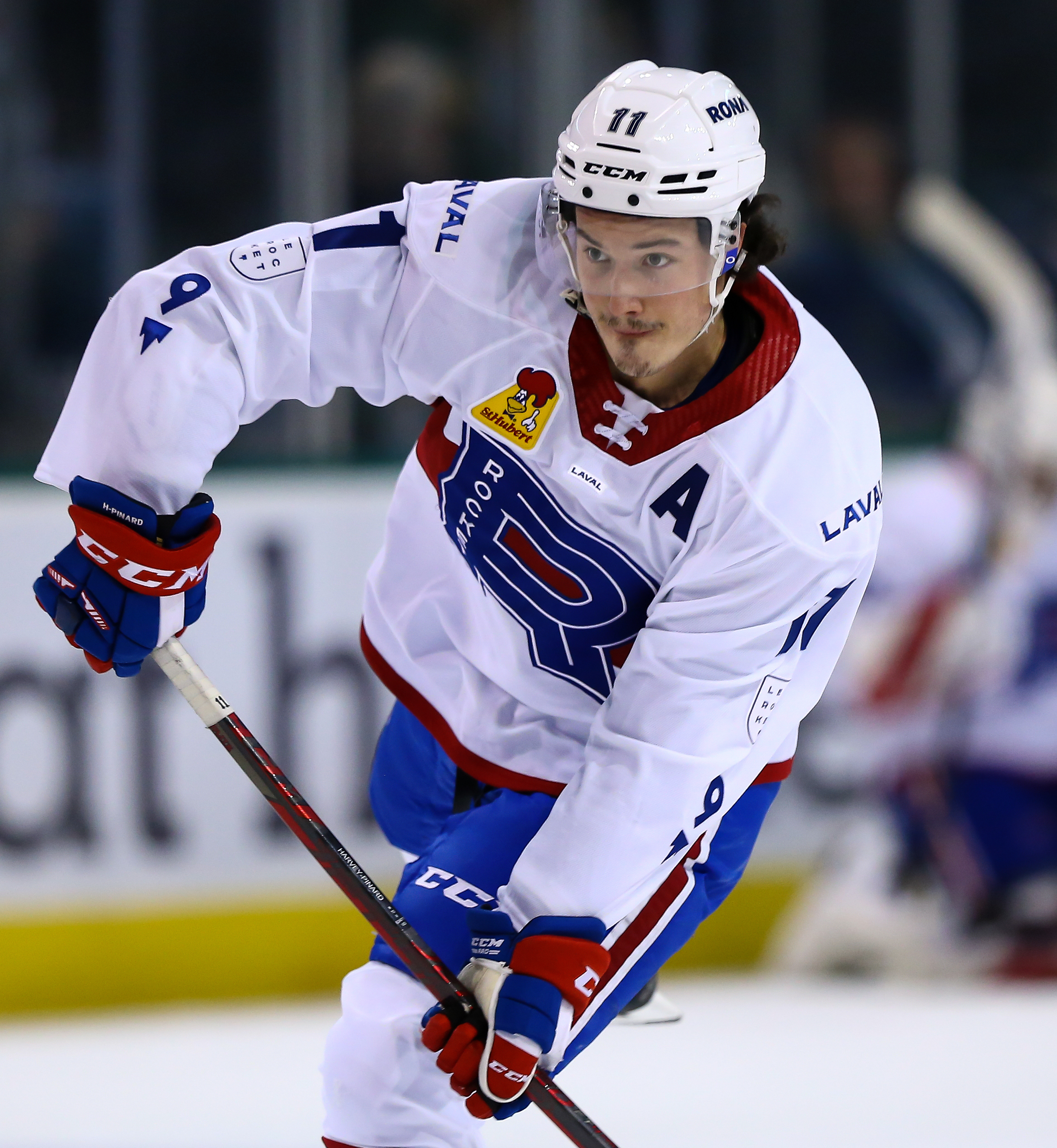
Rafael Harvey-Pinard was selected 201st overall by the Montreal Canadiens.

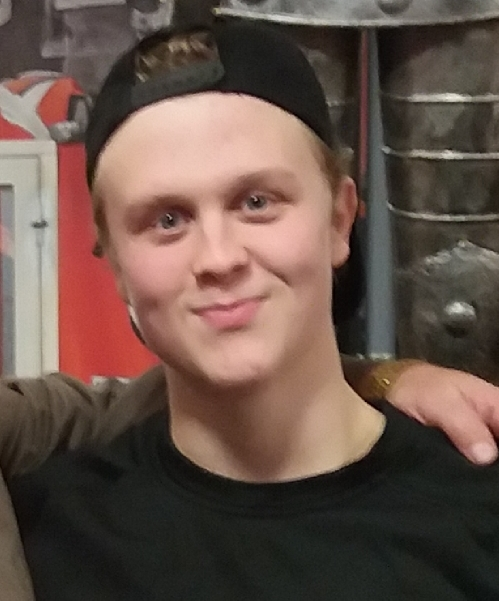
Valtteri Puustinen was selected 203rd overall by the Pittsburgh Penguins.

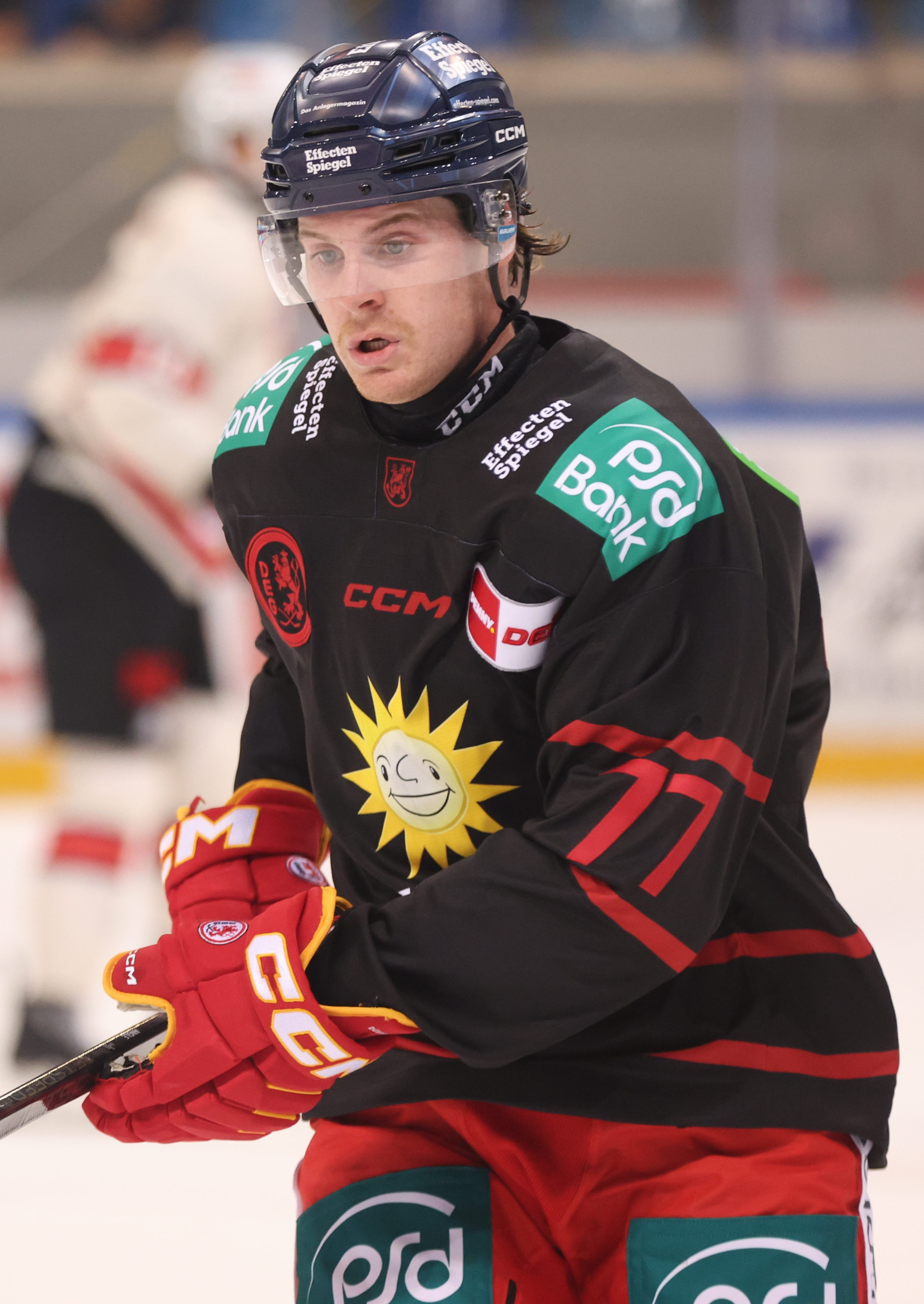
Tyler Angle was selected 212th overall by the Columbus Blue Jackets.

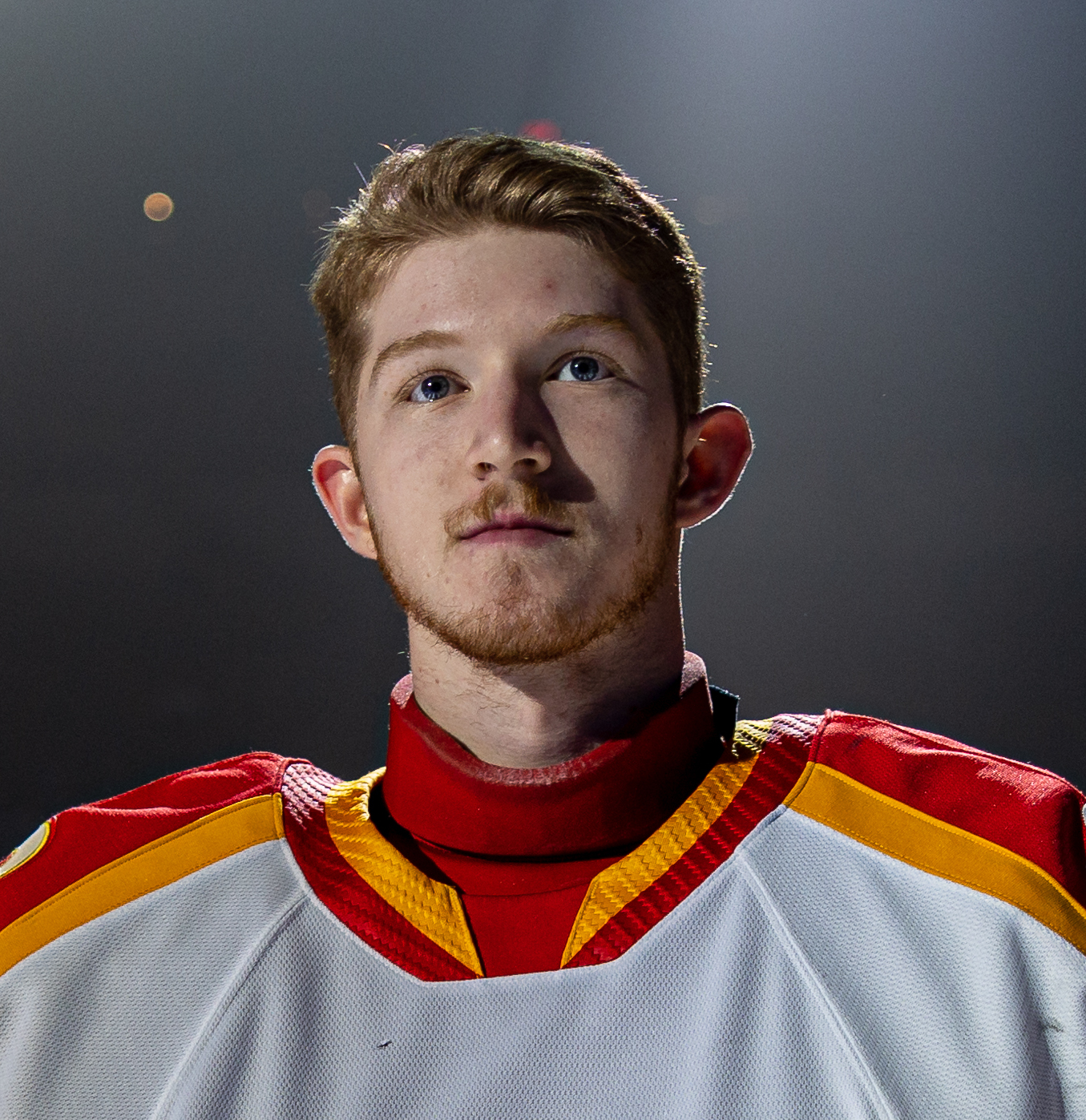
Dustin Wolf was selected 214th overall by the Calgary Flames.

#	Player	Nationality	NHL team	College/junior/club team
187	Maxence Guenette (D)	Canada	Ottawa Senators	Val-d'Or Foreurs (QMJHL)
188	Andre Lee (LW)	Sweden	Los Angeles Kings	Sioux Falls Stampede (USHL)
189	Nikola Pasic (RW)	Sweden	New Jersey Devils	Linköpings HC (SHL)
190	Kirill Tyutyayev (LW)	Russia	Detroit Red Wings	JHC Avto (MHL)
191	Carter Gylander (G)	Canada	Detroit Red Wings (from Buffalo)^{1}	Sherwood Park Crusaders (AJHL)
192	Jake Schmaltz (LW)	United States	Boston Bruins (from NY Rangers)^{2}	Chicago Steel (USHL)
193	Maxim Denezhkin (C)	Russia	Edmonton Oilers	Loko Yaroslavl (MHL)
194	Cole Moberg (D)	Canada	Chicago Blackhawks (from Anaheim)^{3}	Prince George Cougars (WHL)
195	Aidan McDonough (LW)	United States	Vancouver Canucks	Cedar Rapids RoughRiders (USHL)
196	Bryce Brodzinski (RW)	United States	Philadelphia Flyers	Blaine (USHS)
197	Filip Lindberg (G)	Finland	Minnesota Wild	U. of Massachusetts Amherst (Hockey East)
198	Mikhail Shalagin (LW)	Russia	Tampa Bay Lightning (from Chicago)^{4}	JHC Spartak (MHL)
199	Matthew Wedman (C)	Canada	Florida Panthers	Seattle Thunderbirds (WHL)
200	Axel Bergkvist (D)	Sweden	Arizona Coyotes	Leksands IF (HockeyAllsvenskan)
201	Rafael Harvey-Pinard (LW)	Canada	Montreal Canadiens (from Montreal via Philadelphia)^{5}	Rouyn-Noranda Huskies (QMJHL)
202	Trent Miner (G)	Canada	Colorado Avalanche	Vancouver Giants (WHL)
203	Valtteri Puustinen (RW)	Finland	Pittsburgh Penguins (from Vegas)^{6}	HPK (Liiga)
204	Kalle Loponen (D)	Finland	Toronto Maple Leafs (from Dallas)^{7}	Kärpät U20 (Jr. A)
205	Eric Ciccolini (RW)	Canada	New York Rangers (from Columbus)^{8}	Toronto Jr. Canadiens (OJHL)
206	Kieran Ruscheinski (D)	Canada	Montreal Canadiens (from Winnipeg)^{9}	Calgary Northstars (AMHL)
207	Valentin Nussbaumer (C)	Switzerland	Arizona Coyotes (from Pittsburgh)^{10}	Shawinigan Cataractes (QMJHL)
208	Vadim Zherenko (G)	Russia	St. Louis Blues (from Toronto)^{11}	MHC Dynamo Moscow (MHL)
209	Cole Coskey (RW)	United States	New York Islanders	Saginaw Spirit (OHL)
210	Juuso Parssinen (C)	Finland	Nashville Predators	TPS U20 (Jr. A)
211	Santeri Airola (D)	Finland	Pittsburgh Penguins (from Washington via San Jose)^{12}	SaiPa U20 (Jr. A)
212	Tyler Angle (C)	Canada	Columbus Blue Jackets (from Calgary via Ottawa)^{13}	Windsor Spitfires (OHL)
213	McKade Webster (LW)	United States	Tampa Bay Lightning	Green Bay Gamblers (USHL)
214	Dustin Wolf (G)	United States	Calgary Flames (from Carolina)^{14}	Everett Silvertips (WHL)
215	Arvid Costmar (C)	Sweden	Vancouver Canucks (from San Jose)^{15}	Linköpings Jr. (J20 SuperElit)
216	Massimo Rizzo (C)	Canada	Carolina Hurricanes (from Boston via NY Rangers)^{16}	Penticton Vees (BCHL)
217	Jeremy Michel (LW)	Canada	St. Louis Blues	Val-d'Or Foreurs (QMJHL)

Notes

1. The Buffalo Sabres' seventh-round pick went to the Detroit Red Wings as the result of a trade on June 22, 2019, that sent Columbus' fifth-round pick in 2019 (143rd overall) to Buffalo in exchange for Toronto's sixth-round pick in 2019 (177th overall) and this pick.
2. The New York Rangers' seventh-round pick went to the Boston Bruins as the result of a trade on September 11, 2018, that sent Adam McQuaid to New York in exchange for Steven Kampfer, a fourth-round pick in 2019, and this pick (being conditional at the time of the trade). The condition – Boston will receive a seventh-round pick in 2019 if McQuaid plays in at least 25 regular season games during the 2018–19 NHL season – was converted on January 29, 2019.
3. The Anaheim Ducks' seventh-round pick went to the Chicago Blackhawks as the result of a trade on March 1, 2017, that sent Spencer Abbott and Sam Carrick to Anaheim in exchange for Kenton Helgesen and this pick.
4. The Chicago Blackhawks' seventh-round pick went to the Tampa Bay Lightning as the result of a trade on January 11, 2019, that sent Slater Koekkoek and a fifth-round pick in 2019 to Chicago in exchange for Jan Rutta and this pick.
5. The Montreal Canadiens' seventh-round pick was re-acquired as the result of a trade on June 22, 2019, that sent a seventh-round pick in 2020 to Philadelphia in exchange for this pick.
  Philadelphia previously acquired this pick as the result of a trade on June 23, 2018, that sent Montreal's seventh-round pick in 2018 to Montreal in exchange for this pick.
6. The Vegas Golden Knights' seventh-round pick went to the Pittsburgh Penguins as the result of a trade on June 23, 2018, that sent a seventh-round pick in 2018 to Vegas in exchange for this pick.
7. The Dallas Stars' seventh-round pick went to the Toronto Maple Leafs as the result of a trade on October 1, 2018, that sent Connor Carrick to Dallas in exchange for this pick (being conditional at the time of the trade). The condition – Toronto will receive a seventh-round pick in 2019 if Carrick plays in less than 50 games during the 2018–19 NHL season – was converted on January 6, 2019.
8. The Columbus Blue Jackets' seventh-round pick went to the New York Rangers as the result of a trade on February 25, 2019, that sent Adam McQuaid to Columbus in exchange for Julius Bergman, a fourth-round pick in 2019 and this pick.
9. The Winnipeg Jets' seventh-round pick went to the Montreal Canadiens as the result of a trade on June 30, 2018, that sent Simon Bourque to Winnipeg in exchange for Steve Mason, Joel Armia, a fourth-round pick in 2020 and this pick.
10. The Pittsburgh Penguins' seventh-round pick went to the Arizona Coyotes as the result of a trade on June 22, 2019, that sent Chicago's third-round pick in 2019 (74th overall) to Pittsburgh in exchange for Buffalo's fourth-round pick and Tampa Bay's fifth-round pick both in 2019 (98th and 151st overall) and this pick.
11. The Toronto Maple Leafs' seventh-round pick went to the St. Louis Blues as the result of a trade on June 22, 2019, that sent a seventh-round pick in 2020 to Toronto in exchange for this pick.
12. The Washington Capitals' seventh-round pick went to the Pittsburgh Penguins as the result of a trade on June 22, 2019, that sent a seventh-round pick in 2020 to San Jose in exchange for this pick.
  San Jose previously acquired this pick as the result of a trade on June 22, 2019, that sent a fifth-round pick in 2019 (153rd overall) to Washington in exchange for a seventh-round pick in 2020 and this pick.
13. The Calgary Flames' seventh-round pick went to the Columbus Blue Jackets as the result of a trade on February 23, 2019, that sent Anthony Duclair and a second-round pick in 2020 and 2021 to Ottawa in exchange for Ryan Dzingel and this pick.
  Ottawa previously acquired this pick as the result of a trade on February 26, 2018, that sent Nick Shore to Calgary in exchange for this pick.
14. The Carolina Hurricanes' seventh-round pick went to the Calgary Flames as the result of a trade on June 29, 2017, that sent Keegan Kanzig and a sixth-round pick in 2019 to Carolina in exchange for Eddie Lack, Ryan Murphy and this pick.
15. The San Jose Sharks' seventh-round pick went to the Vancouver Canucks as the result of a trade on June 22, 2019, that sent Tom Pyatt and a sixth-round pick in 2019 (164th overall) to San Jose in exchange for Francis Perron and this pick.
16. The Boston Bruins' seventh-round pick went to the Carolina Hurricanes as the result of a trade on June 23, 2018, that sent Vegas' seventh-round pick in 2018 to the New York Rangers in exchange for this pick.
  The Rangers previously acquired this pick as the result of a trade on February 25, 2018, that sent Rick Nash to Boston in exchange for Ryan Spooner, Matt Beleskey, Ryan Lindgren, a first-round pick in 2018 and this pick.

== Draftees based on nationality ==
Rank	Country	Selections	Percent	Top selection
	North America	126	58.1%	
1	Canada	70	32.3%	Kirby Dach, 3rd
2	United States	56	25.8%	Jack Hughes, 1st
	Europe	91	41.9%	
3	Russia	28	12.9%	Vasily Podkolzin, 10th
4	Sweden	26	12.0%	Philip Broberg, 8th
5	Finland	22	10.1%	Kaapo Kakko, 2nd
6	Czech Republic	7	3.2%	Lukas Parik, 87th
7	Belarus	2	0.9%	Vladislav Kolyachonok, 52nd
7	Denmark	2	0.9%	Mads Sogaard, 37th
9	Germany	1	0.5%	Moritz Seider, 6th
9	Latvia	1	0.5%	Arturs Silovs, 156th
9	Slovakia	1	0.5%	Maxim Cajkovic, 89th
9	Switzerland	1	0.5%	Valentin Nussbaumer, 207th

=== North American draftees by state/province ===
Rank	State/province	Selections	Percent	Top selection
1	Ontario	21	9.7%	Philip Tomasino, 24th
2	New York	13	6.0%	Trevor Zegras, 9th
3	Alberta	11	5.1%	Kirby Dach, 3rd
3	Quebec	11	5.1%	Samuel Poulin, 21st
3	Minnesota	11	5.1%	Bobby Brink, 34th
6	British Columbia	10	4.6%	Bowen Byram, 4th
7	Saskatchewan	7	3.2%	Kaedan Korczak, 41st
8	Massachusetts	5	2.3%	Matt Boldy, 12th
8	California	5	2.3%	Cameron York, 14th
10	Michigan	4	1.8%	Ronnie Attard, 72nd
11	Illinois	3	1.4%	Alex Turcotte, 5th
11	Nova Scotia	3	1.4%	Matthew Stienburg, 63rd
13	Connecticut	2	0.9%	Spencer Knight, 13th
13	Wisconsin	2	0.9%	Cole Caufield, 15th
13	Virginia	2	0.9%	Zachary Jones, 68th
13	New Jersey	2	0.9%	John Farinacci, 76th
17	Florida	1	0.5%	Jack Hughes, 1st
17	Yukon	1	0.5%	Dylan Cozens, 7th
17	Newfoundland and Labrador	1	0.5%	Alex Newhook, 16th
17	Colorado	1	0.5%	Nolan Foote, 27th
17	Rhode Island	1	0.5%	Jayden Struble, 46th
17	Pennsylvania	1	0.5%	Cade Webber, 99th
17	Arizona	1	0.5%	Mark Kastelic, 125th
17	Alaska	1	0.5%	Isaiah Saville, 135th
17	Oklahoma	1	0.5%	Owen Lindmark, 137th
17	North Dakota	1	0.5%	Judd Caulfield, 145th
17	Manitoba	1	0.5%	Trent Miner, 202nd
17	Missouri	1	0.5%	McKade Webster, 213th

== See also ==
- 2016–17 NHL transactions
- 2017–18 NHL transactions
- 2018–19 NHL transactions
- 2019–20 NHL transactions
- 2019–20 NHL season
- List of first overall NHL draft picks
- List of NHL players
