= 2020 NHL entry draft =

2020 North American ice hockey draft

General information
- Date: October 6–7, 2020
- Location: NHL Network studios, Secaucus, New Jersey, U.S. (draft held via video conference call)
- Networks: Sportsnet (Canada); NBCSN (United States)

Overview
- 217 total selections in 7 rounds
- First selection: (Canada) Alexis Lafreniere (New York Rangers)

The 2020 NHL entry draft was the 58th draft for the National Hockey League. It was held on October 6–7, 2020. It was originally scheduled for June 26–27, 2020, at the Bell Centre in Montreal, but was postponed on March 25, 2020, due to the COVID-19 pandemic. The event was held in a remote format, with teams convening via videoconferencing, and Commissioner Gary Bettman announcing the selections in the opening round and deputy commissioner Bill Daly in all subsequent rounds from the NHL Network studios in Secaucus, New Jersey.

The first three selections were Alexis Lafreniere by the New York Rangers, Quinton Byfield by the Los Angeles Kings, and Tim Stutzle by the Ottawa Senators.

== Eligibility ==
Ice hockey players born between January 1, 2000, and September 15, 2002, were eligible for selection in the 2020 NHL entry draft. Additionally, un-drafted, non-North American players born in 1999 were eligible for the draft; and those players who were drafted in the 2018 NHL entry draft, but not signed by an NHL team and who were born after June 30, 2000, were also eligible to re-enter the draft.

== Draft lottery ==
=== First phase ===
External videos
- Commissioner Bettman draws 2020 Draft lottery (phase 1), NHL's official YouTube channel. June 26, 2020.

The first three picks overall in this draft were awarded by lottery. Since the 2012–13 NHL season all teams not qualifying for the Stanley Cup playoffs have a "weighted" chance at winning the first overall selection. Beginning with the 2014–15 NHL season the NHL changed the weighting system that was used in previous years. Under the new system the odds of winning the draft lottery for the four lowest finishing teams in the league decreased, while the odds for the other non-playoff teams increased.

Due to the COVID-19 pandemic, the 2019–20 regular season was cut short after it was suspended on March 12, 2020. The league then implemented a special 24-team format for the 2020 Stanley Cup playoffs that included an additional Qualifying Round. The NHL also wanted to hold the draft lottery before the playoffs began on August 1, 2020, while at the same time keeping its 15-team draft lottery system. It was decided that the draft lottery would include the seven teams that did not qualify for the playoffs, and eight placeholders representing the yet-to-be-determined clubs eliminated in the qualifying round.

The first phase of the draft lottery was held on June 26, 2020. The first overall pick was won by "Team E", one of the placeholders. As a result, the league conducted a second draft lottery on August 10, 2020, while the Los Angeles Kings moved up two spots and the Ottawa Senators (previously acquired from San Jose) remained at third overall. In the process, the Detroit Red Wings and Ottawa Senators moved down three spots from first and second overall, respectively, while the Anaheim Ducks, New Jersey Devils and Buffalo Sabres each dropped one spot.

Indicates team won first overall
Indicates team won second overall
Indicates team won third overall
Indicates teams that did not win a lottery

Complete draft position odds
Team	1st	2nd	3rd	4th	5th	6th	7th	8th	9th	10th	11th	12th	13th	14th	15th
Detroit	18.5%	16.5%	14.4%	50.6%											
Ottawa	13.5%	13.0%	12.3%	33.3%	27.9%										
San Jose	11.5%	11.3%	11.1%	13.2%	37.7%	15.2%									
Los Angeles	9.5%	9.6%	9.7%	2.8%	26.1%	34.0%	8.3%								
Anaheim	8.5%	8.7%	8.9%		8.4%	34.5%	26.7%	4.3%							
New Jersey	7.5%	7.8%	8.0%			16.3%	38.9%	19.4%	2.1%						
Buffalo	6.5%	6.8%	7.1%				26.0%	39.5%	13.1%	1.0%					
Team A	6.0%	6.3%	6.7%					36.8%	36.0%	7.8%	0.4%				
Team B	5.0%	5.3%	5.7%						48.8%	30.7%	4.3%	0.1%			
Team C	3.5%	3.8%	4.1%							60.5%	25.7%	2.4%	<0.1%		
Team D	3.0%	3.3%	3.6%								69.6%	19.4%	1.1%	<0.1%	
Team E	2.5%	2.7%	3.0%									78.0%	13.3%	0.4%	<0.1%
Team F	2.0%	2.2%	2.4%										85.5%	7.8%	0.1%
Team G	1.5%	1.7%	1.8%											91.8%	3.2%
Team H	1.0%	1.1%	1.2%												96.7%

=== Second phase ===
External videos
- The New York Rangers win the 2020 NHL Draft Lottery, NHL's official YouTube channel. August 10, 2020.

Because a placeholder team won the initial draft lottery, a second lottery took place on August 10. The second phase of the lottery gave all eight teams eliminated in the qualifying round of the 2020 Stanley Cup playoffs an equal chance to win the first overall pick. This guaranteed that a team that made the playoffs would select first overall in draft for the first time since 1983. Each eliminated team had one lottery ball; the seven teams that did not win the second draft lottery were assigned picks nine through fifteen based on inverse order of points percentage. The New York Rangers won phase two of the draft lottery and moved up nine spots in the draft order to earn the first selection in the draft.

Indicates team won first overall

Odds at first selection
Team	1st
Edmonton	12.5%
Florida	12.5%
Minnesota	12.5%
Nashville	12.5%
NY Rangers	12.5%
Pittsburgh	12.5%
Toronto	12.5%
Winnipeg	12.5%

== Top prospects ==
Source: NHL Central Scouting final (April 8, 2020) ranking.

Ranking	North American skaters	European skaters
1	(Canada) Alexis Lafreniere (LW)	(Germany) Tim Stutzle (C)
2	(Canada) Quinton Byfield (C)	(Sweden) Alexander Holtz (RW)
3	(Canada) Jamie Drysdale (D)	(Finland) Anton Lundell (C)
4	(United States) Jake Sanderson (D)	(Sweden) Lucas Raymond (LW)
5	(Canada) Cole Perfetti (C)	(Russia) Rodion Amirov (LW)
6	(Austria) Marco Rossi (C)	(Sweden) Helge Grans (D)
7	(Canada) Jack Quinn (RW)	(Germany) John-Jason Peterka (LW)
8	(Canada) Kaiden Guhle (D)	(Finland) Topi Niemela (D)
9	(Canada) Braden Schneider (D)	(Sweden) Noel Gunler (RW)
10	(Canada) Dawson Mercer (C)	(Finland) Roni Hirvonen (C)

Ranking	North American goalies	European goalies
1	(Canada) Nico Daws	(Russia) Yaroslav Askarov
2	(United States) Drew Commesso	(Czech Republic) Jan Bednar
3	(Slovakia) Samuel Hlavaj	(Finland) Joel Blomqvist

== Selections by round ==
The order of the 2020 entry draft is listed below.

=== Round one ===
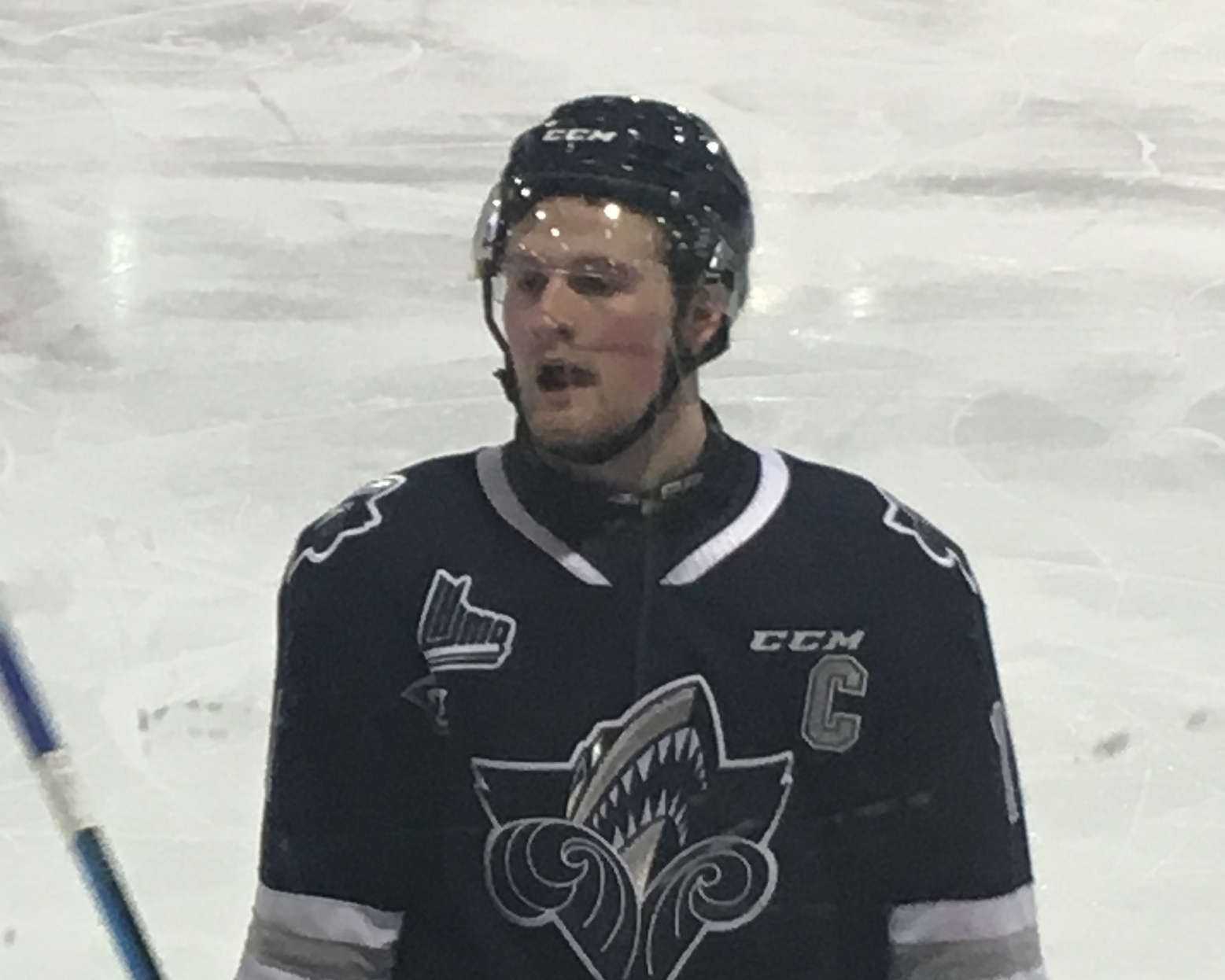
Alexis Lafreniere was selected first overall by the New York Rangers.

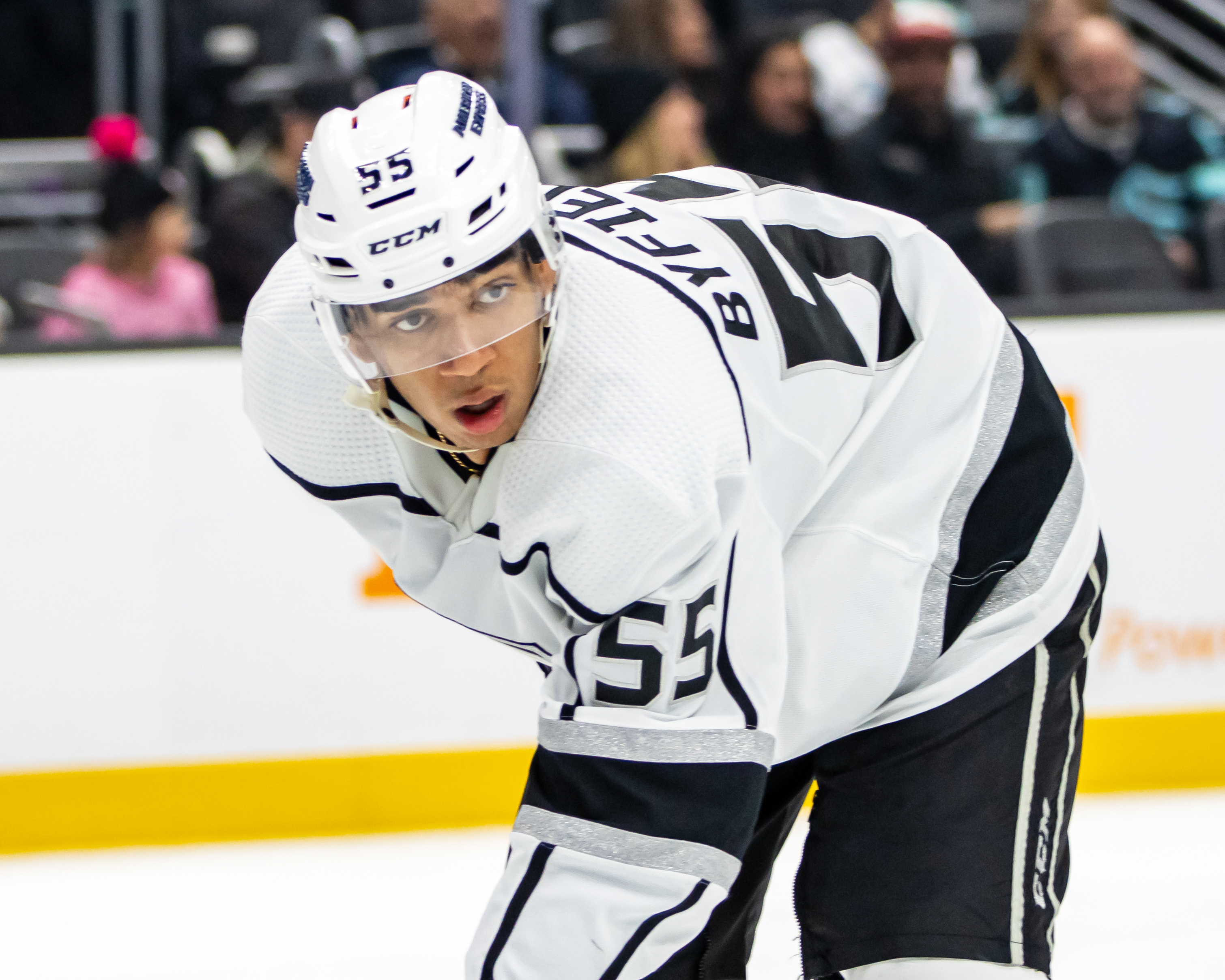
Quinton Byfield was selected second overall by the Los Angeles Kings.

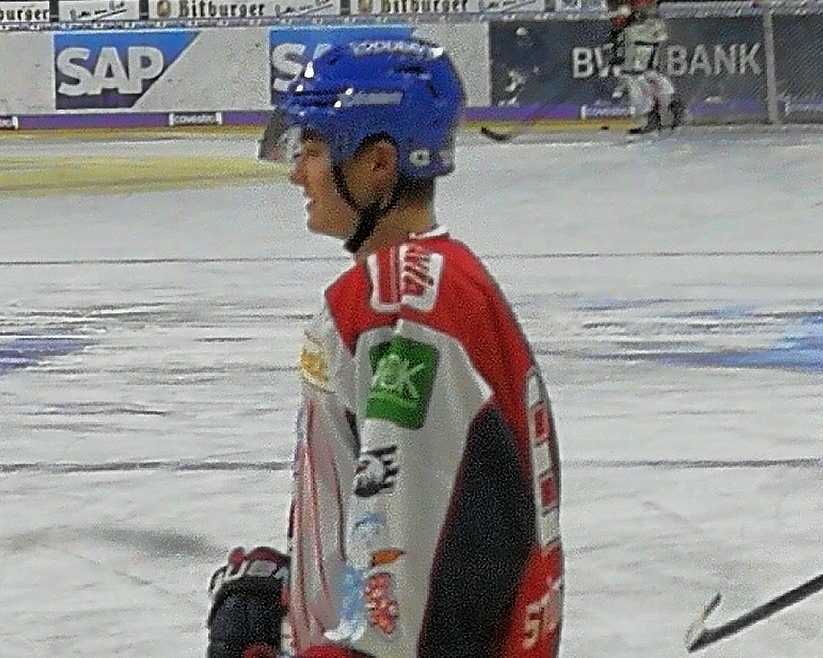
Tim Stutzle was selected third overall by the Ottawa Senators.

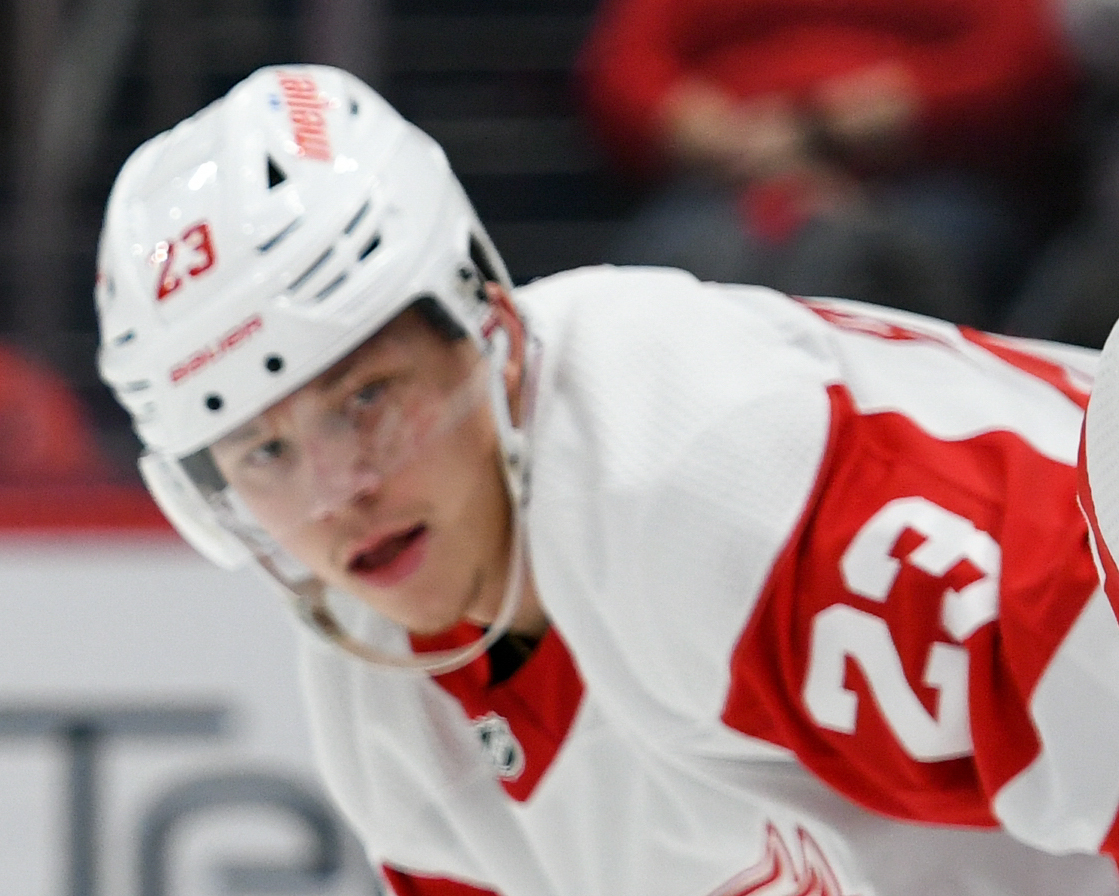
Lucas Raymond was selected fourth overall by the Detroit Red Wings.

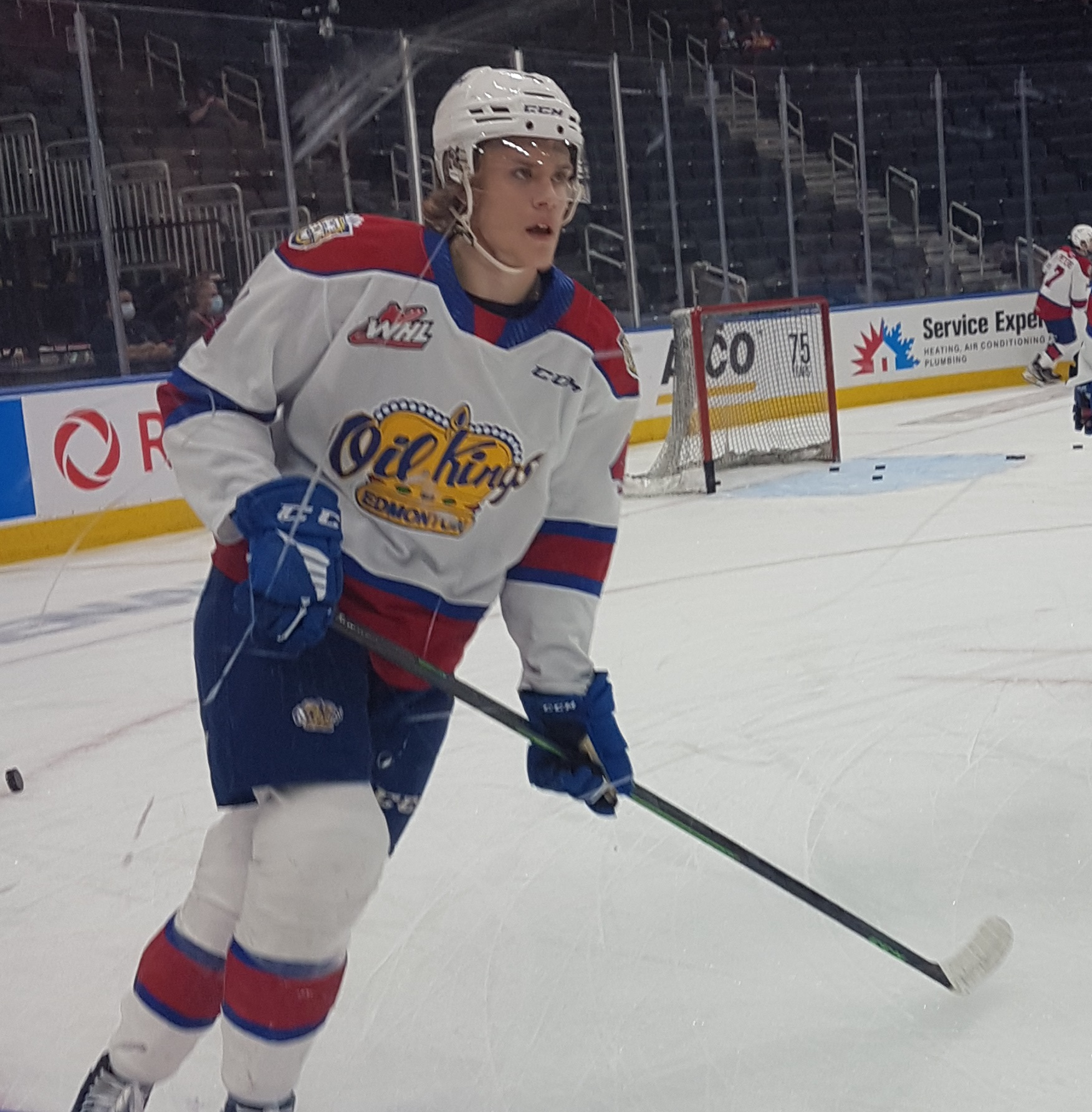
Kaiden Guhle was selected 16th overall by the Montreal Canadiens.

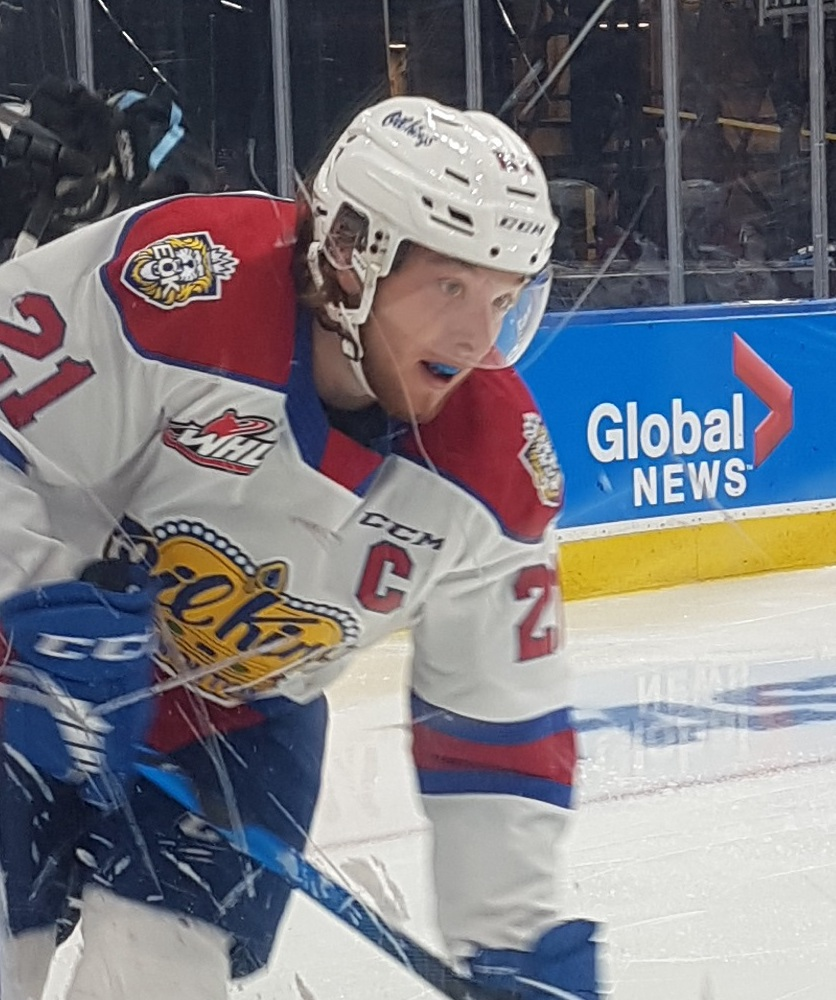
Jake Neighbours was selected 26th overall by the St. Louis Blues.

#	Player	Nationality	NHL team	College/junior/club team
1	Alexis Lafreniere (LW)	Canada	New York Rangers	Rimouski Oceanic (QMJHL)
2	Quinton Byfield (C)	Canada	Los Angeles Kings	Sudbury Wolves (OHL)
3	Tim Stutzle (C)	Germany	Ottawa Senators (from San Jose)^{1}	Adler Mannheim (DEL)
4	Lucas Raymond (LW)	Sweden	Detroit Red Wings	Frolunda HC (SHL)
5	Jake Sanderson (D)	United States	Ottawa Senators	U.S. NTDP (USHL)
6	Jamie Drysdale (D)	Canada	Anaheim Ducks	Erie Otters (OHL)
7	Alexander Holtz (RW)	Sweden	New Jersey Devils	Djurgardens IF (SHL)
8	Jack Quinn (RW)	Canada	Buffalo Sabres	Ottawa 67's (OHL)
9	Marco Rossi (C)	Austria	Minnesota Wild	Ottawa 67's (OHL)
10	Cole Perfetti (C)	Canada	Winnipeg Jets	Saginaw Spirit (OHL)
11	Yaroslav Askarov (G)	Russia	Nashville Predators	SKA-Neva (VHL)
12	Anton Lundell (C)	Finland	Florida Panthers	HIFK (Liiga)
13	Seth Jarvis (C)	Canada	Carolina Hurricanes (from Toronto)^{2}	Portland Winterhawks (WHL)
14	Dylan Holloway (C)	Canada	Edmonton Oilers	Wisconsin Badgers (Big Ten)
15	Rodion Amirov (C)	Russia	Toronto Maple Leafs (from Pittsburgh)^{3}	Salavat Yulaev Ufa (KHL)
16	Kaiden Guhle (D)	Canada	Montreal Canadiens	Prince Albert Raiders (WHL)
17	Lukas Reichel (LW)	Germany	Chicago Blackhawks	Eisbaren Berlin (DEL)
18	Dawson Mercer (C)	Canada	New Jersey Devils (from Arizona)^{4}	Chicoutimi Sagueneens (QMJHL)
19	Braden Schneider (D)	Canada	New York Rangers (from Calgary)^{5}	Brandon Wheat Kings (WHL)
20	Shakir Mukhamadullin (D)	Russia	New Jersey Devils (from Vancouver via Tampa Bay)^{6}	Salavat Yulaev Ufa (KHL)
21	Egor Chinakhov (RW)	Russia	Columbus Blue Jackets	Avangard Omsk (KHL)
22	Hendrix Lapierre (C)	Canada	Washington Capitals (from Carolina via NY Rangers and Calgary)^{7}	Chicoutimi Sagueneens (QMJHL)
23	Tyson Foerster (RW)	Canada	Philadelphia Flyers	Barrie Colts (OHL)
24	Connor Zary (C)	Canada	Calgary Flames (from Washington)^{8}	Kamloops Blazers (WHL)
25	Justin Barron (D)	Canada	Colorado Avalanche	Halifax Mooseheads (QMJHL)
26	Jake Neighbours (LW)	Canada	St. Louis Blues	Edmonton Oil Kings (WHL)
27	Jacob Perreault (RW)	Canada	Anaheim Ducks (from Boston)^{9}	Sarnia Sting (OHL)
28	Ridly Greig (C)	Canada	Ottawa Senators (from NY Islanders)^{10}	Brandon Wheat Kings (WHL)
29	Brendan Brisson (C)	United States	Vegas Golden Knights	Chicago Steel (USHL)
30	Mavrik Bourque (C)	Canada	Dallas Stars	Shawinigan Cataractes (QMJHL)
31	Ozzy Wiesblatt (RW)	Canada	San Jose Sharks (from Tampa Bay)^{11}	Prince Albert Raiders (WHL)

Notes

1. The San Jose Sharks' first-round pick went to the Ottawa Senators as the result of a trade on September 13, 2018, that sent Erik Karlsson and Francis Perron to San Jose in exchange for Chris Tierney, Dylan DeMelo, Josh Norris, Rudolfs Balcers, a conditional second-round pick in 2019, a conditional first-round pick in 2021, a conditional first-round pick no later than 2022 and this pick (being conditional at the time of the trade). The condition – Ottawa will receive a first-round pick in 2020 if San Jose qualifies for the 2019 Stanley Cup playoffs – was converted on March 19, 2019.
2. The Toronto Maple Leafs' first-round pick went to the Carolina Hurricanes as the result of a trade on June 22, 2019, that sent a sixth-round pick in 2020 to Toronto in exchange for Patrick Marleau, a seventh-round pick in 2020 and this pick (being conditional at the time of the trade). The condition – Carolina will receive a first-round pick in 2020 if Toronto's first-round pick in 2020 is outside of the top ten selections – was converted on August 10, 2020, when Toronto lost the second phase of the draft lottery.
3. The Pittsburgh Penguins' first-round pick went to the Toronto Maple Leafs as the result of a trade on August 25, 2020, that sent Kasperi Kapanen, Pontus Aberg and Jesper Lindgren to Pittsburgh in exchange for Evan Rodrigues, Filip Hallander, David Warsofsky and this pick.
4. The Arizona Coyotes' first-round pick went to the New Jersey Devils as the result of a trade on December 16, 2019, that sent Taylor Hall and Blake Speers to Arizona in exchange for Nick Merkley, Kevin Bahl, Nate Schnarr, a conditional third-round pick in 2021 and this pick (being conditional at the time of the trade). The condition – New Jersey will receive a first-round pick in 2020 if Arizona's pick is outside the top three - was converted when the Coyotes advanced to the first round of the 2020 Stanley Cup playoffs on August 7, 2020.
5. The Calgary Flames' first-round pick went to the New York Rangers as the result of a trade on October 6, 2020, that sent Carolina's first-round pick and a third-round pick both in 2020 (22nd and 72nd overall) to Calgary in exchange for this pick.
6. The Vancouver Canucks' first-round pick went to the New Jersey Devils as the result of a trade on February 16, 2020, that sent Blake Coleman to Tampa Bay in exchange for Nolan Foote and this pick (being conditional at the time of the trade). The condition – New Jersey will receive a first-round pick in 2020 if Vancouver qualifies for the 2020 Stanley Cup playoffs – was converted when the Canucks advanced to the first round of the playoffs on August 7, 2020.
  Tampa Bay previously acquired this pick in a trade on June 22, 2019, that sent J. T. Miller to Vancouver in exchange for Marek Mazanec, a third-round pick in 2019 and this pick.
7. The Carolina Hurricanes' first-round pick went to the Washington Capitals as the result of a trade on October 6, 2020, that sent a first-round pick and Arizona's third-round both in 2020 (24th and 80th overall) to Calgary in exchange for this pick.
  Calgary previously acquired this pick as the result of a trade on October 6, 2020, that sent a first-round pick in 2020 (19th overall) to New York in exchange for a third-round pick in 2020 (72nd overall) and this pick.
  The Rangers previously acquired this pick as the result of a trade on February 24, 2020, that sent Brady Skjei to Carolina in exchange for this pick (being conditional at the time of the trade). The condition – New York will receive the later of Carolina or Toronto's first-round pick in 2020 if Carolina acquires the Maple Leafs' first-round pick in 2020. Otherwise New York will receive the Hurricanes' first-round pick in 2020. – was converted when the Maple Leafs were eliminated from the 2020 Stanley Cup playoffs on August 9, 2020.
8. The Washington Capitals' first-round pick went to the Calgary Flames as the result of a trade on October 6, 2020, that sent Carolina's first-round pick in 2020 (22nd overall) to Washington in exchange for Arizona's third-round pick in 2020 (80th overall) and this pick.
9. The Boston Bruins' first-round pick went to the Anaheim Ducks as the result of a trade on February 21, 2020, that sent Ondrej Kase to Boston in exchange for David Backes, Axel Andersson and this pick.
10. The New York Islanders' first-round pick went to the Ottawa Senators as the result of a trade on February 24, 2020, that sent Jean-Gabriel Pageau to New York in exchange for a second-round pick in 2020, a conditional third-round pick in 2022 and this pick (being conditional at the time of the trade). The condition – Ottawa will receive a first-round pick in 2020 if New York's first-round pick is outside the top three selections – was converted when the Islanders advanced to the first round of the 2020 Stanley Cup playoffs on August 7, 2020.
11. The Tampa Bay Lightning's first-round pick went to the San Jose Sharks as the result of a trade on February 24, 2020, that sent Barclay Goodrow and Philadelphia's third-round pick in 2020 to Tampa Bay in exchange for Anthony Greco and this pick.

=== Round two ===
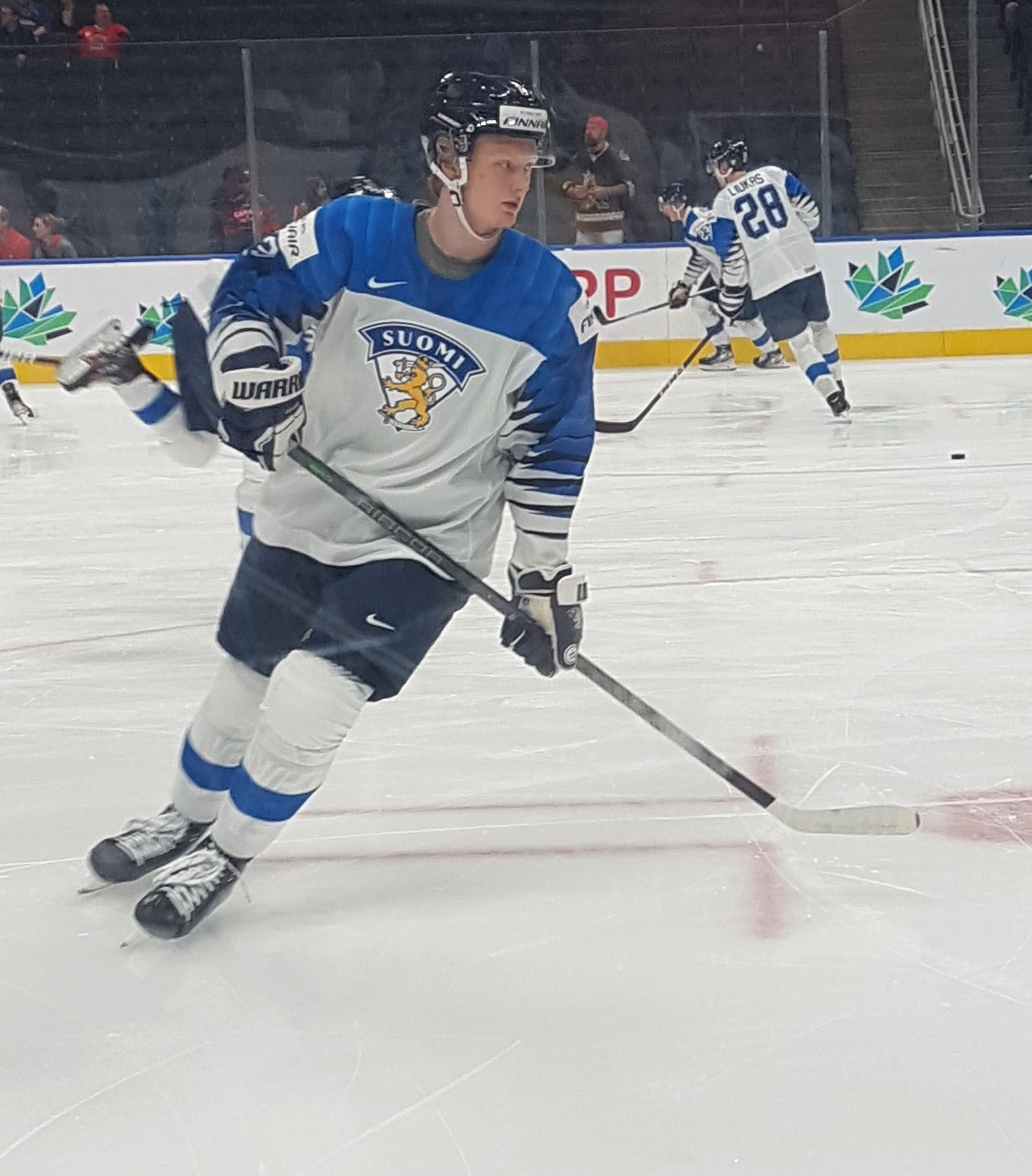
Roby Jarventie was selected 33rd overall by the Ottawa Senators.

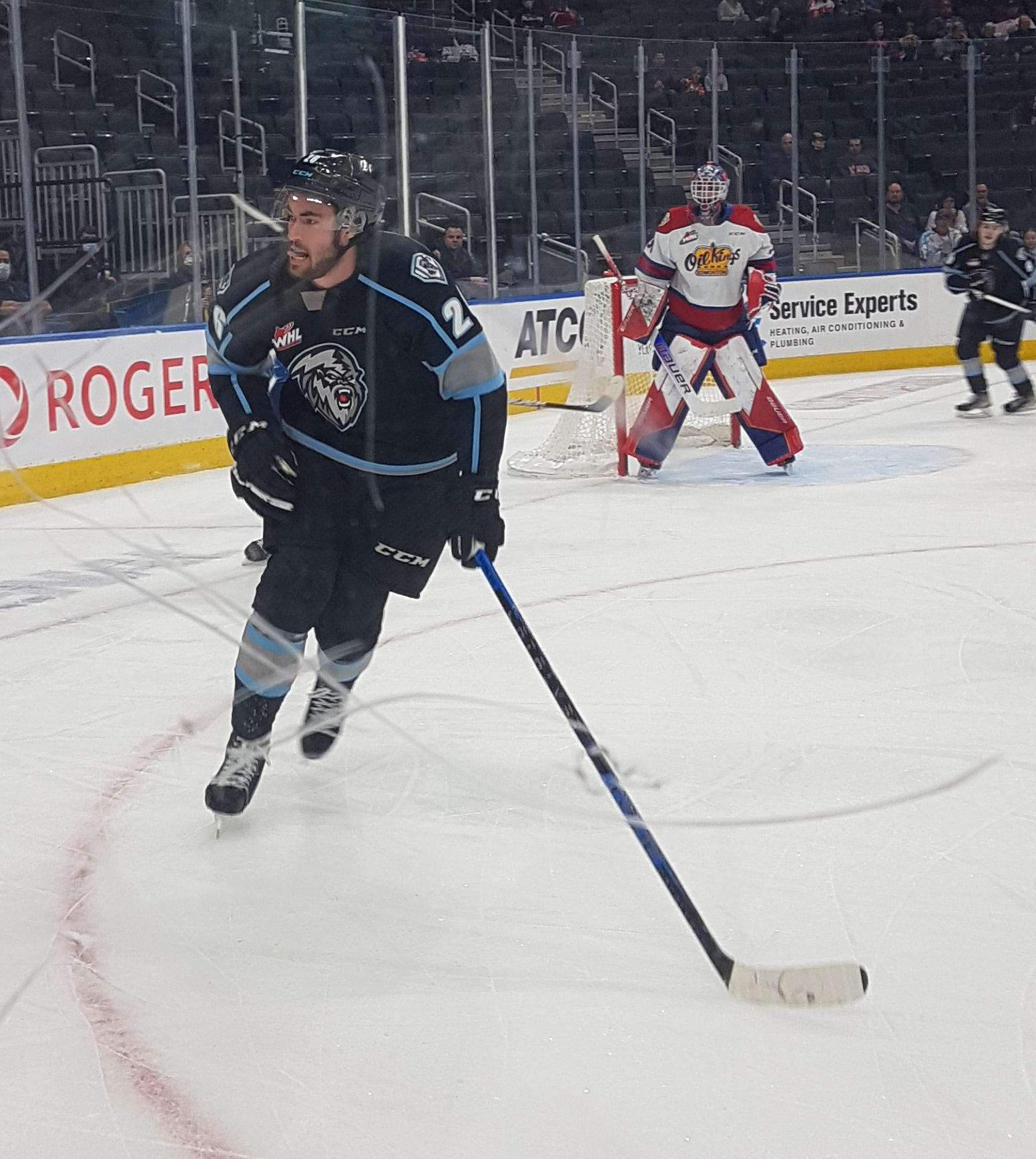
Jack Finley was selected 57th overall by the Tampa Bay Lightning.

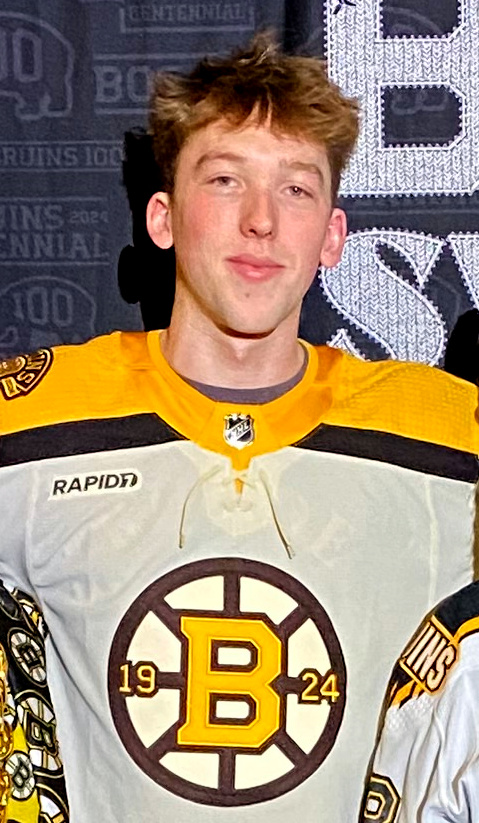
Mason Lohrei was selected 58th overall by the Boston Bruins.

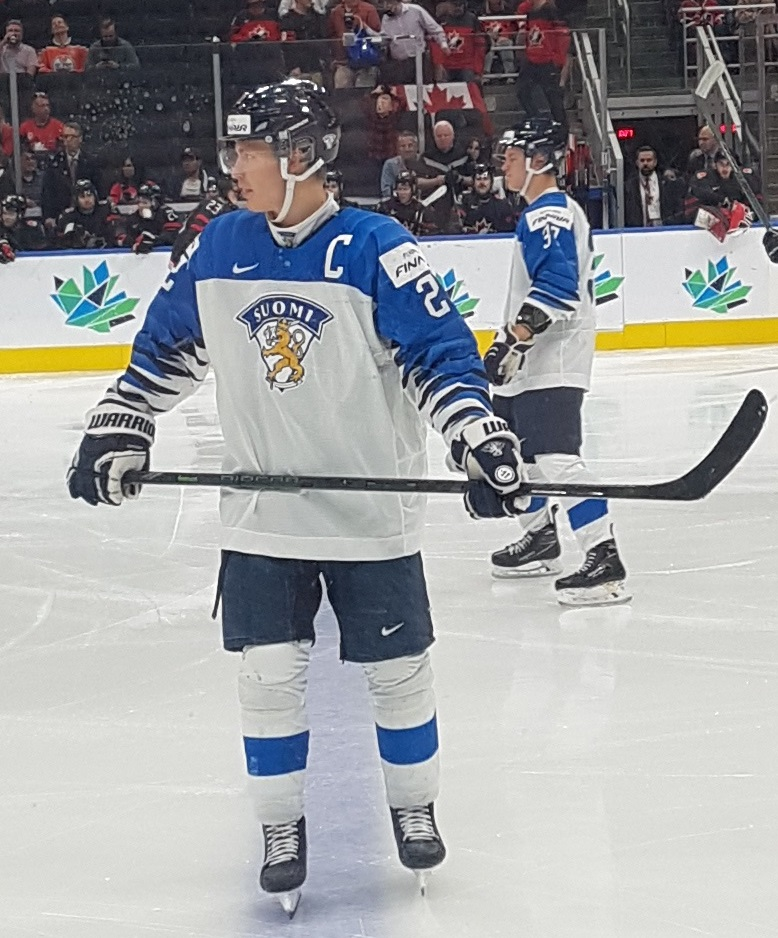
Roni Hirvonen was selected 59th overall by the Toronto Maple Leafs.

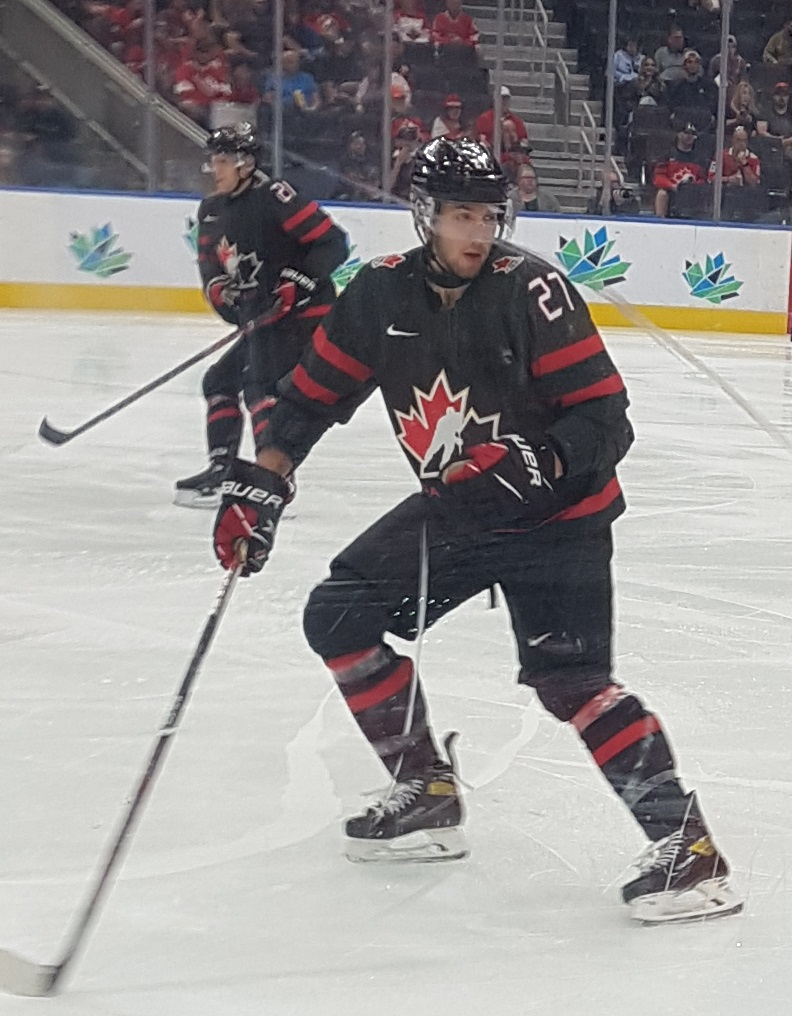
Will Cuylle was selected 60th overall by the New York Rangers.

#	Player	Nationality	NHL team	College/junior/club team
32	William Wallinder (D)	Sweden	Detroit Red Wings	Modo J20 (J20 SuperElit)
33	Roby Jarventie (LW)	Finland	Ottawa Senators	Koovee (Mestis)
34	JJ Peterka (LW)	Germany	Buffalo Sabres (from San Jose)^{1}	EHC Red Bull Munchen (DEL)
35	Helge Grans (D)	Sweden	Los Angeles Kings	Malmo Redhawks (SHL)
36	Sam Colangelo (RW)	United States	Anaheim Ducks	Chicago Steel (USHL)
37	Marat Khusnutdinov (C)	Russia	Minnesota Wild (from New Jersey via Nashville)^{2}	SKA-1946 (MHL)
38	Thomas Bordeleau (C)	United States	San Jose Sharks (from Buffalo)^{3}	U.S. NTDP (USHL)
39	Ryan O'Rourke (D)	Canada	Minnesota Wild	Sault Ste. Marie Greyhounds (OHL)
40	Daniel Torgersson (LW)	Sweden	Winnipeg Jets	Frolunda J20 (J20 SuperElit)
41	Noel Gunler (RW)	Sweden	Carolina Hurricanes (from NY Rangers)^{4}	Lulea HF (SHL)
42	Luke Evangelista (RW)	Canada	Nashville Predators	London Knights (OHL)
43	Emil Heineman (LW)	Sweden	Florida Panthers	Leksands IF (SHL)
44	Tyler Kleven (D)	United States	Ottawa Senators (from Toronto)^{5}	U.S. NTDP (USHL)
45	Brock Faber (D)	United States	Los Angeles Kings (from Edmonton via Detroit)^{6}	U.S. NTDP (USHL)
46	Drew Commesso (G)	United States	Chicago Blackhawks (from Pittsburgh via Vegas)^{7}	U.S. NTDP (USHL)
47	Luke Tuch (LW)	United States	Montreal Canadiens	U.S. NTDP (USHL)
48	Jan Mysak (C)	Czech Republic	Montreal Canadiens (from Chicago)^{8}	Hamilton Bulldogs (OHL)
~~49~~	Forfeited pick^{9}		~~Arizona Coyotes~~	
50	Yan Kuznetsov (D)	Russia	Calgary Flames	UConn Huskies (H-East)
51	Theodor Niederbach (C)	Sweden	Detroit Red Wings (from Vancouver via Los Angeles)^{10}	Frolunda J20 (J20 SuperElit)
52	Joel Blomqvist (G)	Finland	Pittsburgh Penguins (from Columbus via Ottawa)^{11}	Oulun Karpat U20 (Jr. SM-liiga)
53	Vasili Ponomaryov (C)	Russia	Carolina Hurricanes	Shawinigan Cataractes (QMJHL)
54	Emil Andrae (D)	Sweden	Philadelphia Flyers	HV71 J20 (J20 SuperElit)
55	Cross Hanas (LW)	United States	Detroit Red Wings (from Washington)^{12}	Portland Winterhawks (WHL)
56	Tristen Robins (RW)	Canada	San Jose Sharks (from Colorado via Washington)^{13}	Saskatoon Blades (WHL)
57	Jack Finley (C)	Canada	Tampa Bay Lightning (from St. Louis via Montreal)^{14}	Spokane Chiefs (WHL)
58	Mason Lohrei (D)	United States	Boston Bruins	Green Bay Gamblers (USHL)
59	Roni Hirvonen (C)	Finland	Toronto Maple Leafs (from NY Islanders via Ottawa)^{15}	Assat (Liiga)
60	Will Cuylle (LW)	Canada	New York Rangers (from Vegas via Los Angeles)^{16}	Windsor Spitfires (OHL)
61	Egor Sokolov (LW)	Russia	Ottawa Senators (from Dallas via Vegas)^{17}	Cape Breton Eagles (QMJHL)
62	Gage Goncalves (C)	Canada	Tampa Bay Lightning	Everett Silvertips (WHL)

Notes

1. The San Jose Sharks' second-round pick went to the Buffalo Sabres as the result of a trade on October 7, 2020, that sent a second and fourth-round pick both in 2020 (38th and 100th overall) to San Jose in exchange for this pick.
2. The New Jersey Devils' second-round pick went to the Minnesota Wild as the result of a trade on October 7, 2020, that sent Luke Kunin and a fourth-round pick in 2020 (101st overall) to Nashville in exchange for Nick Bonino, Minnesota's third-round pick in 2020 (70th overall) and this pick.
  Nashville previously acquired this pick as the result of a trade on June 22, 2019, that sent P. K. Subban to New Jersey in exchange for Steven Santini, Jeremy Davies, a second-round pick in 2019 and this pick.
3. The Buffalo Sabres' second-round pick went to the San Jose Sharks as the result of a trade on October 7, 2020, that sent a second-round pick in 2020 (34th overall) to Buffalo in exchange for a fourth-round pick in 2020 (100th overall) and this pick.
4. The New York Rangers' second-round pick went to the Carolina Hurricanes as the result of a trade on April 30, 2019, that sent Adam Fox to New York in exchange for a second-round pick in 2019 and this pick (being conditional at the time of the trade). The condition – Carolina will receive a second-round pick in 2020 if Fox plays in at least 30 games during the 2019–20 NHL season – was converted on December 10, 2019.
5. The Toronto Maple Leafs' second-round pick went to the Ottawa Senators as the result of a trade on October 7, 2020, that sent the Islanders' second-round pick and a third-round pick both in 2020 (59th and 64th overall) to Toronto in exchange for this pick.
6. The Edmonton Oilers' second-round pick went to the Los Angeles Kings as the result of a trade on October 7, 2020, that sent Vancouver's second-round pick and a fourth-round pick both in 2020 (51st and 97th overall) to Detroit in exchange for this pick.
  Detroit previously acquired this pick as the result of a trade on February 24, 2020, that sent Andreas Athanasiou and Ryan Kuffner to Edmonton in exchange for Sam Gagner, a second-round pick in 2021 and this pick.
7. The Pittsburgh Penguins' second-round pick went to the Chicago Blackhawks as the result of a trade on February 24, 2020, that sent Martins Dzierkals to Vegas in exchange for Malcolm Subban, Stanislav Demin and this pick.
  Vegas previously acquired this pick as the result of a trade on June 21, 2017, that ensured that Vegas selected Marc-Andre Fleury in the 2017 NHL expansion draft from Pittsburgh in exchange for this pick.
8. The Chicago Blackhawks' second-round pick went to the Montreal Canadiens as the result of a trade on June 30, 2019, that sent Andrew Shaw and a seventh-round pick in 2021 to Chicago in exchange for a seventh-round pick in 2020, a third-round pick in 2021 and this pick.
9. The Arizona Coyotes' second-round pick in 2020 was forfeited as the result of a penalty sanction due to violations of the NHL Combine Testing Policy during the 2019–20 NHL season. The penalty includes the forfeiture of a first-round pick in 2021.
10. The Vancouver Canucks' second-round pick went to the Detroit Red Wings as the result of a trade on October 7, 2020, that sent Edmonton's second-round pick in 2020 (45th overall) to Los Angeles in exchange for a fourth-round pick in 2020 (97th overall) and this pick.
  Los Angeles previously acquired this pick as the result of a trade on February 17, 2020, that sent Tyler Toffoli to Vancouver in exchange for Tim Schaller, Tyler Madden, a conditional fourth-round pick in 2022 and this pick.
11. The Columbus Blue Jackets' second-round pick went to the Pittsburgh Penguins as the result of a trade October 7, 2020, that sent Matt Murray to Ottawa in exchange for Jonathan Gruden and this pick.
  Ottawa previously acquired this pick as the result of a trade on February 23, 2019, that sent Ryan Dzingel and Calgary's seventh-round pick in 2019 to Columbus in exchange for Anthony Duclair, a second-round pick in 2021 and this pick.
12. The Washington Capitals' second-round pick went to the Detroit Red Wings as the result of a trade on February 22, 2019, that sent Nick Jensen and Buffalo's fifth-round pick in 2019 to Washington in exchange for Madison Bowey and this pick.
13. The Colorado Avalanche's second-round pick went to the San Jose Sharks as the result of a trade on February 18, 2020, that sent Brenden Dillon to Washington in exchange for a conditional third-round pick in 2021 and this pick.
  Washington previously acquired this pick as the result of a trade on June 28, 2019, that sent Andre Burakovsky to Colorado in exchange for Scott Kosmachuk, Arizona's third-round pick in 2020 and this pick.
14. The St. Louis Blues' second-round pick went to the Tampa Bay Lightning as the result of a trade on October 7, 2020, that sent a fourth-round pick in 2020 (124th overall) and a second-round pick in 2021 to Montreal in exchange for this pick.
  Montreal previously acquired this pick as the result of a trade on February 18, 2020, that sent Marco Scandella to St. Louis in exchange for a conditional fourth-round pick in 2021 and this pick.
15. The New York Islanders' second-round pick went to the Toronto Maple Leafs as the result of a trade on October 7, 2020, that sent a second-round pick in 2020 (44th overall) to Ottawa in exchange for a third-round pick in 2020 (64th overall) and this pick.
  Ottawa previously acquired this pick as the result of a trade on February 24, 2020, that sent Jean-Gabriel Pageau to New York in exchange for a conditional first-round pick in 2020, a conditional third-round pick in 2022 and this pick.
16. The Vegas Golden Knights' second-round pick went to the New York Rangers as the result of a trade on October 7, 2020, that sent Lias Andersson to Los Angeles in exchange for this pick.
  Los Angeles previously acquired this pick as the result of a trade on February 19, 2020, that sent Alec Martinez to Vegas in exchange for St. Louis' second-round pick in 2021 and this pick.
17. The Dallas Stars' second-round pick went to the Ottawa Senators as the result of a trade on February 25, 2019, that sent Mark Stone and Tobias Lindberg to Vegas in exchange for Erik Brannstrom, Oscar Lindberg and this pick.
  Vegas previously acquired this pick as the result of a trade on June 26, 2017, that sent Marc Methot to Dallas in exchange for Dylan Ferguson and this pick.

=== Round three ===
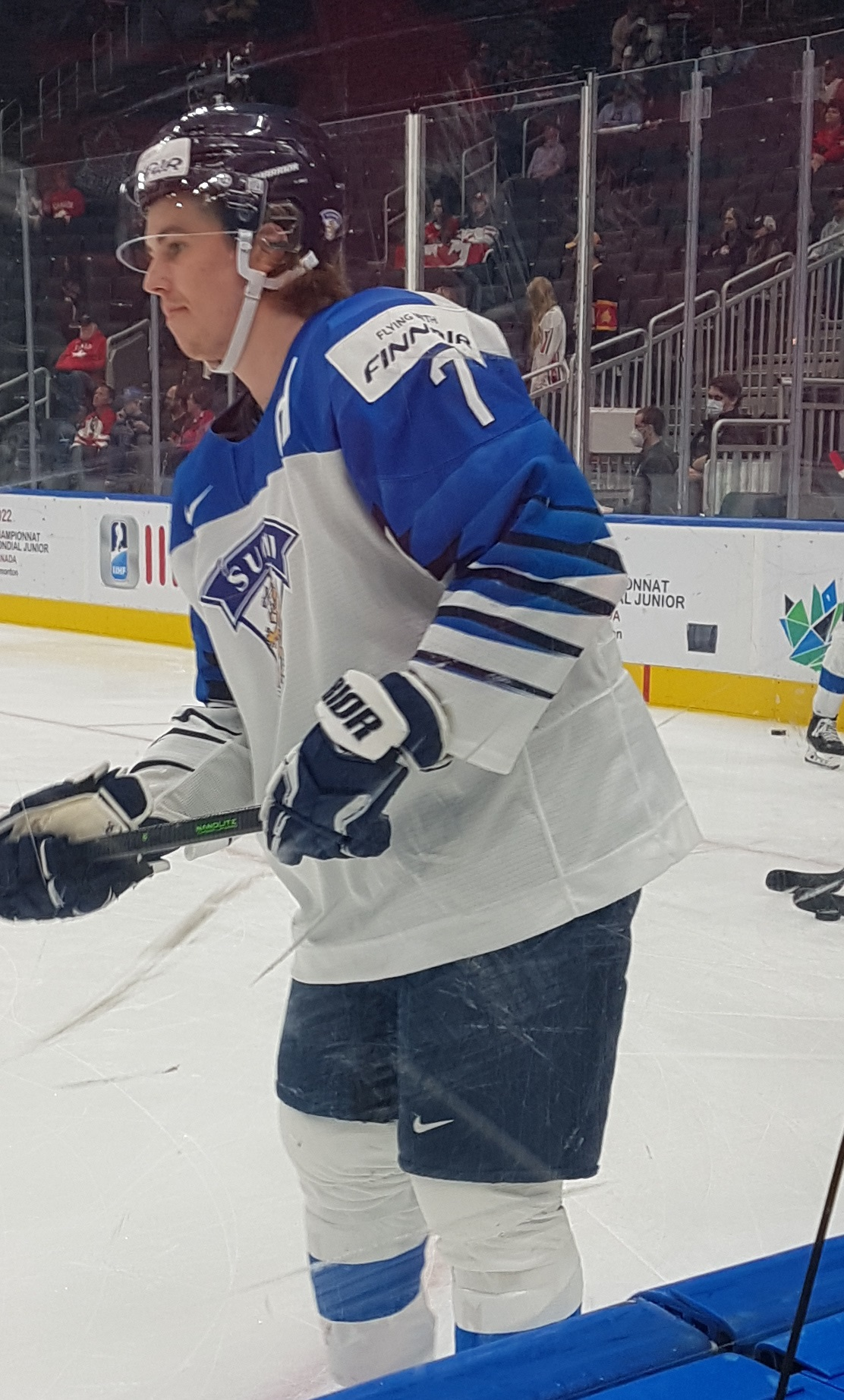
Topi Niemela was selected 64th overall by the Toronto Maple Leafs.

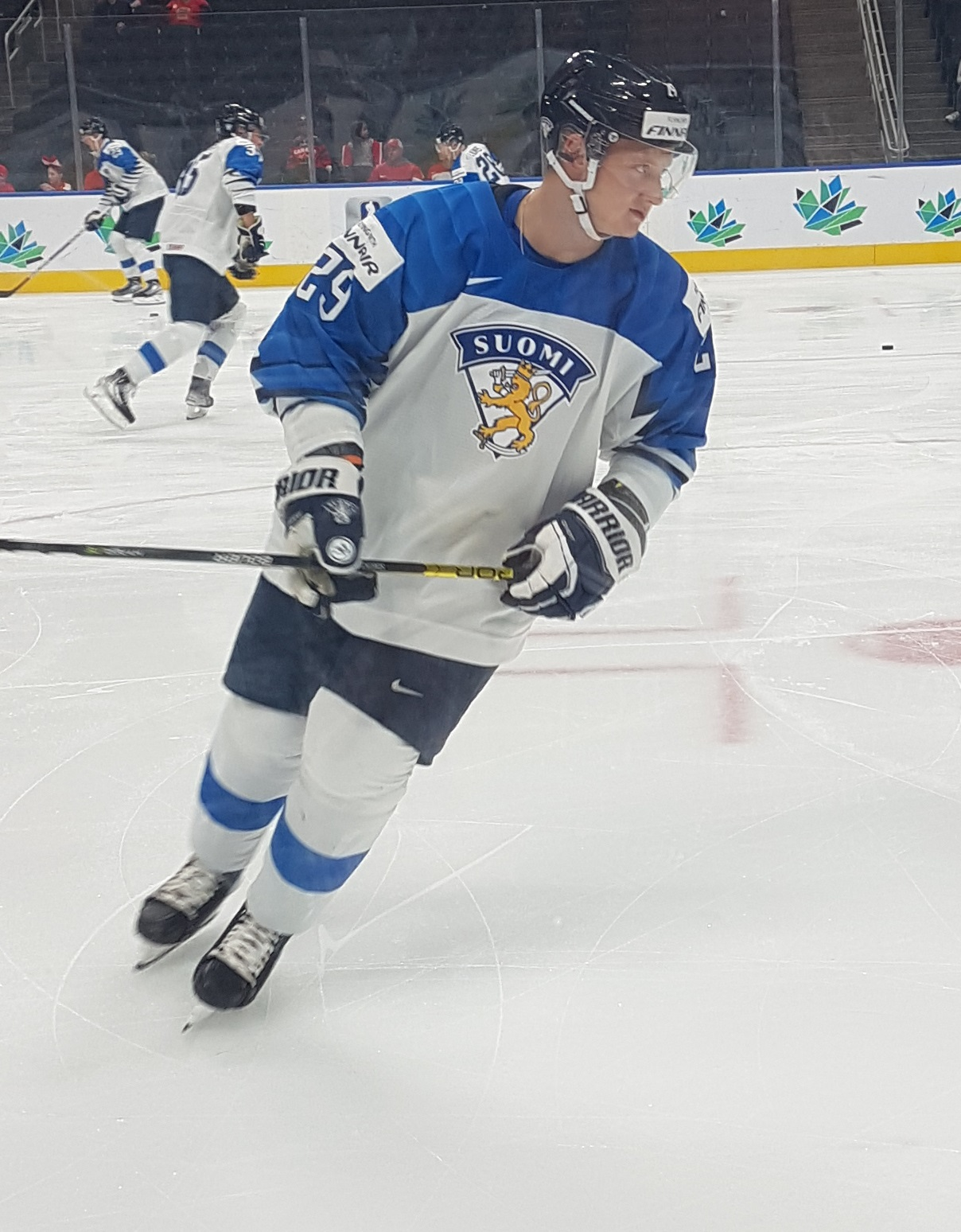
Kasper Simontaival was selected 66th overall by the Los Angeles Kings.

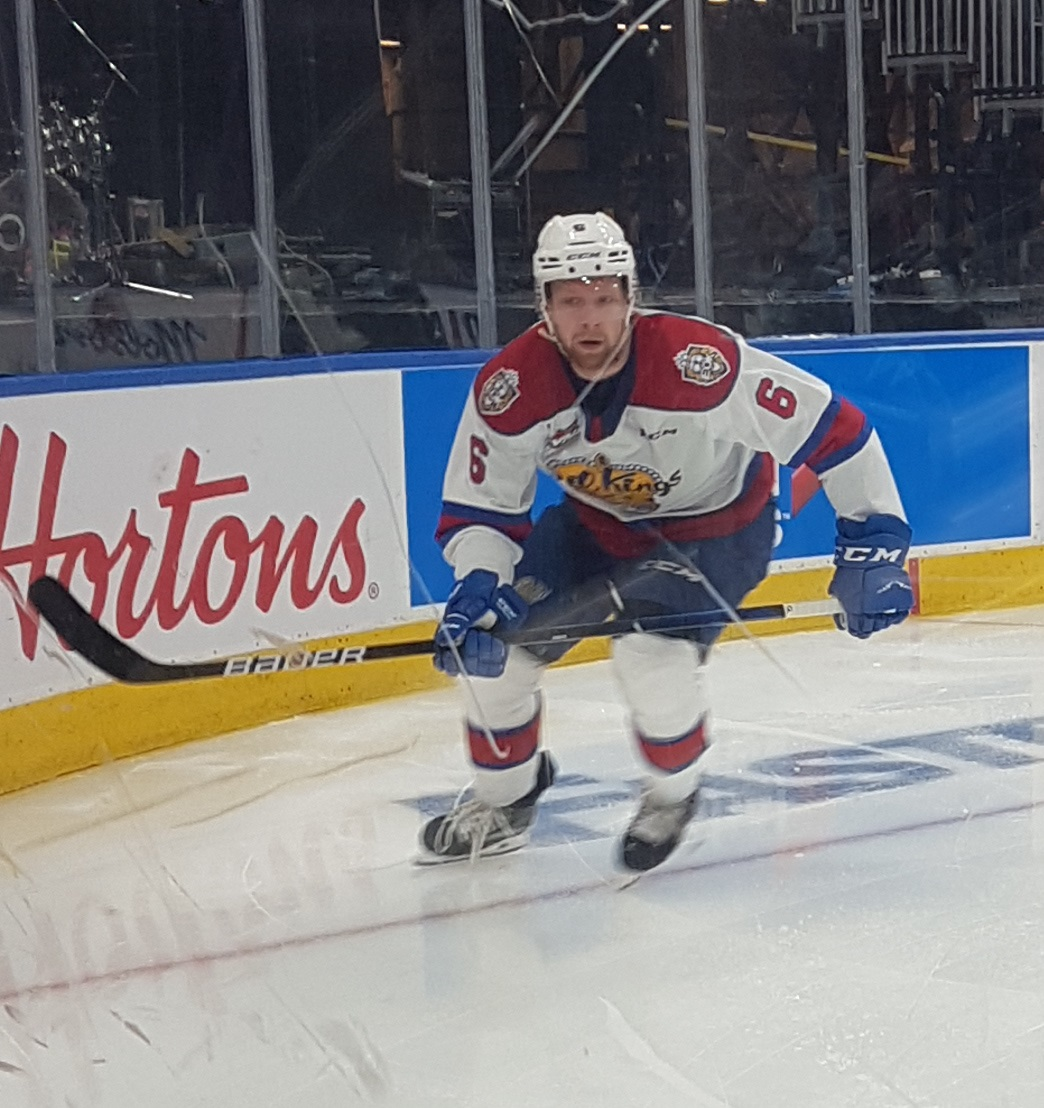
Luke Prokop was selected 73rd overall by the Nashville Predators.

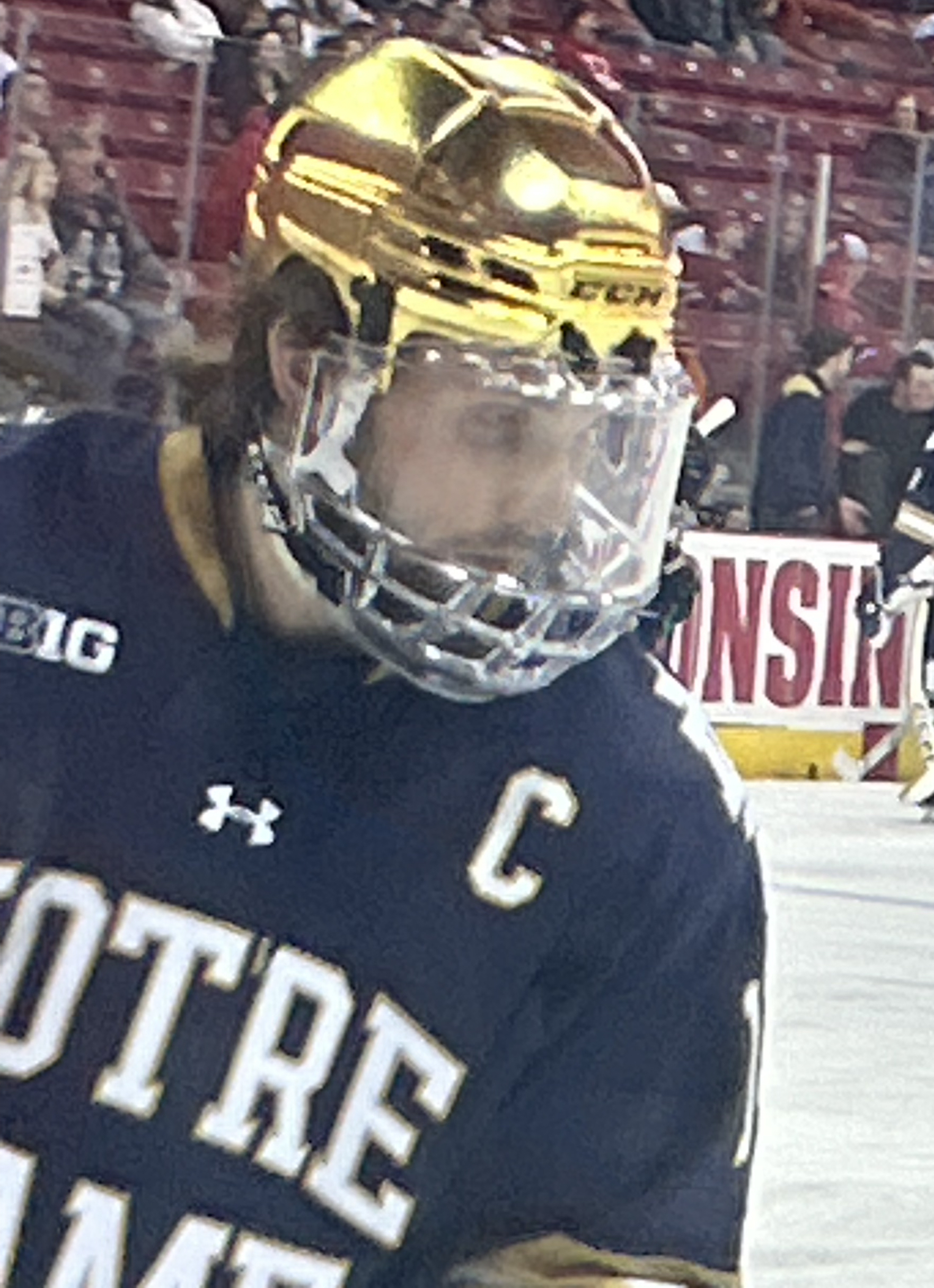
Landon Slaggert was selected 79th overall by the Chicago Blackhawks.

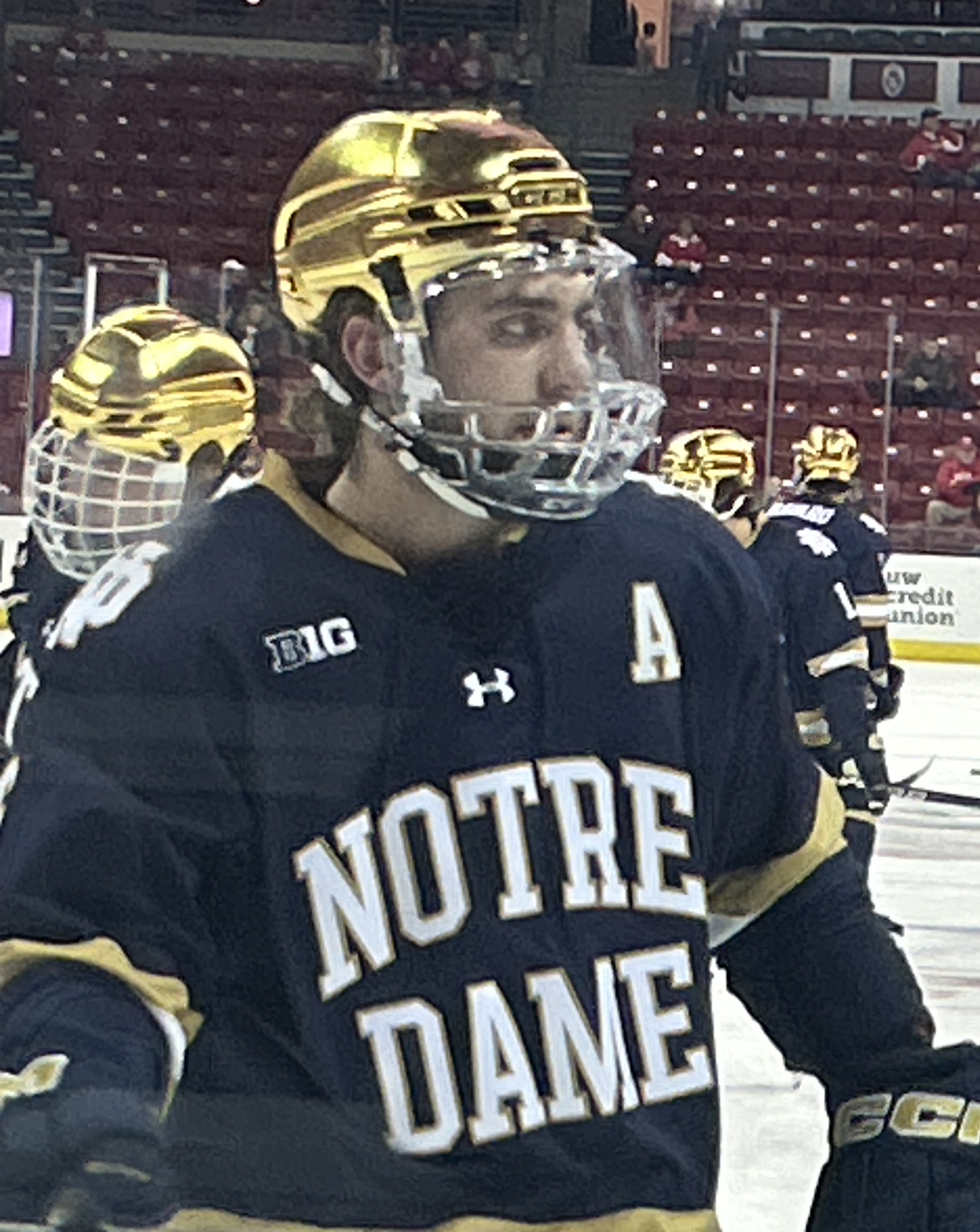
Jake Boltmann was selected 80th overall by the Calgary Flames.

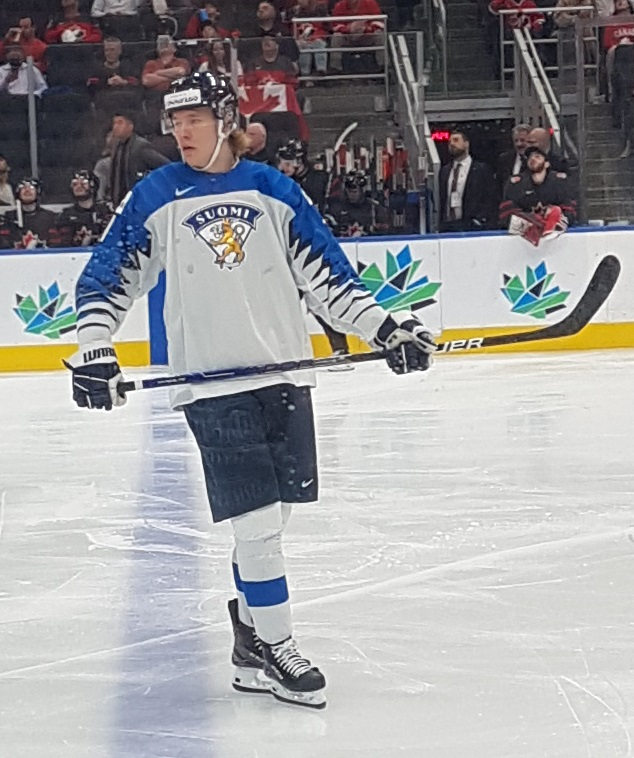
Joni Jurmo was selected 82nd overall by the Vancouver Canucks.

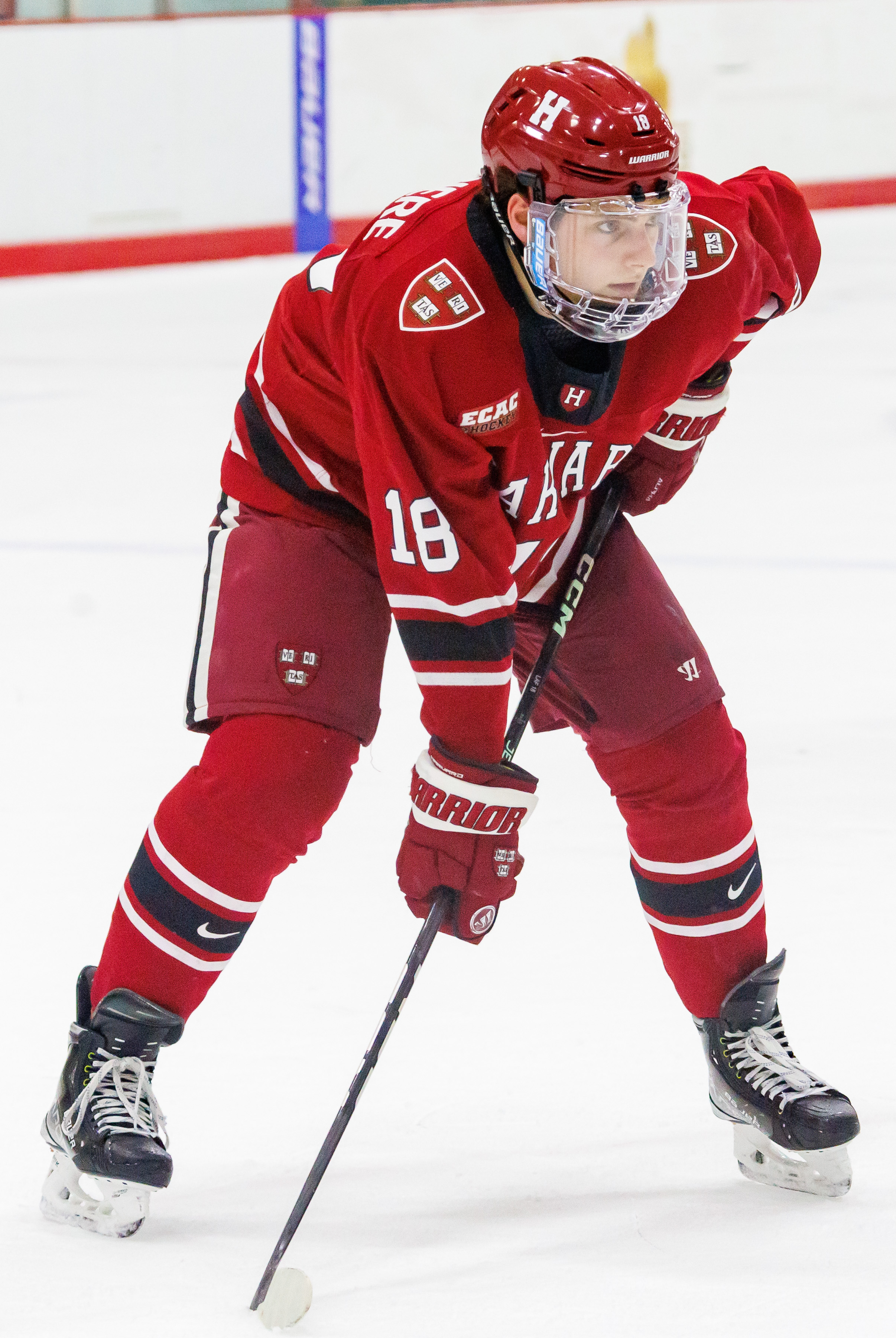
Alex Laferriere was selected 83rd overall by the Los Angeles Kings.

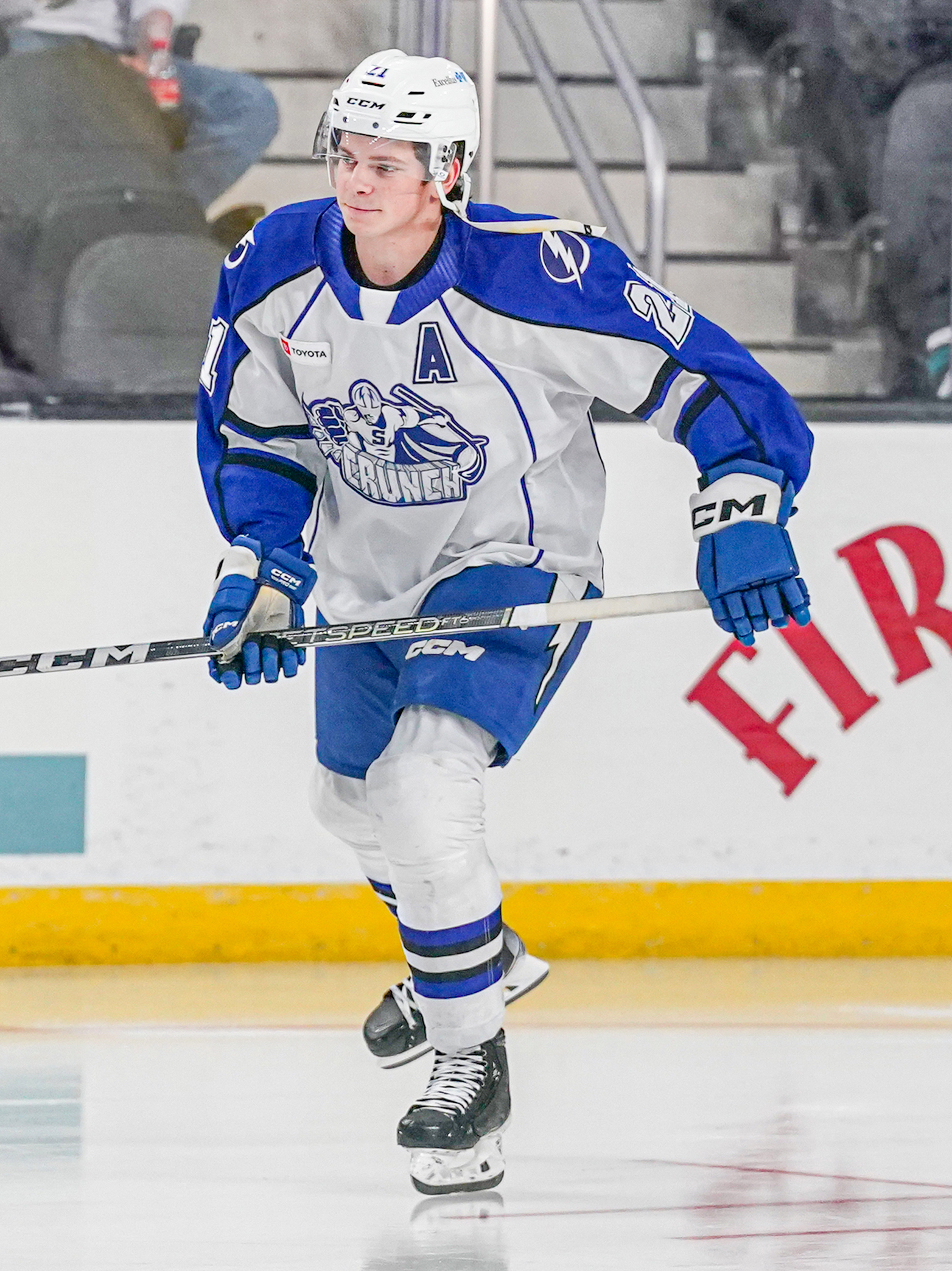
Jack Thompson was selected 93rd overall by the Tampa Bay Lightning.

#	Player	Nationality	NHL team	College/junior/club team
63	Donovan Sebrango (D)	Canada	Detroit Red Wings	Kitchener Rangers (OHL)
64	Topi Niemela (D)	Finland	Toronto Maple Leafs (from Ottawa)^{1}	Oulun Karpat (Liiga)
65	Daemon Hunt (D)	Canada	Minnesota Wild (from San Jose via Detroit)^{2}	Moose Jaw Warriors (WHL)
66	Kasper Simontaival (RW)	Finland	Los Angeles Kings	Tappara (Liiga)
67	Ian Moore (D)	United States	Anaheim Ducks	St. Mark's Lions (USHS-MA)
68	Lukas Cormier (D)	Canada	Vegas Golden Knights (from New Jersey)^{3}	Charlottetown Islanders (QMJHL)
69	Alexander Nikishin (D)	Russia	Carolina Hurricanes (from Buffalo)^{4}	HC Spartak Moscow (KHL)
70	Eemil Viro (D)	Finland	Detroit Red Wings (from Minnesota via Nashville and Minnesota)^{5}	TPS (Liiga)
71	Leevi Merilainen (G)	Finland	Ottawa Senators (from Winnipeg)^{6}	Oulun Karpat U20 (Jr. SM-liiga)
72	Jeremie Poirier (D)	Canada	Calgary Flames (from NY Rangers)^{7}	Saint John Sea Dogs (QMJHL)
73	Luke Prokop (D)	Canada	Nashville Predators	Calgary Hitmen (WHL)
74	Ty Smilanic (C)	United States	Florida Panthers	U.S. NTDP (USHL)
75	Jean-Luc Foudy (C)	Canada	Colorado Avalanche (from Toronto)^{8}	Windsor Spitfires (OHL)
76	Daniil Gushchin (LW)	Russia	San Jose Sharks (from Edmonton)^{9}	Muskegon Lumberjacks (USHL)
77	Calle Clang (G)	Sweden	Pittsburgh Penguins	Kristianstads IK (HockeyAllsvenskan)
78	Samuel Knazko (D)	Slovakia	Columbus Blue Jackets (from Montreal)^{10}	TPS U20 (Jr. SM-liiga)
79	Landon Slaggert (LW)	United States	Chicago Blackhawks	U.S. NTDP (USHL)
80	Jake Boltmann (D)	United States	Calgary Flames (from Arizona via Colorado and Washington)^{11}	Edina Hornets (USHS-MN)
81	Wyatt Kaiser (D)	United States	Chicago Blackhawks (from Calgary)^{12}	Andover Huskies (USHS-MN)
82	Joni Jurmo (D)	Finland	Vancouver Canucks	Jokerit U20 (Jr. SM-liiga)
83	Alex Laferriere (RW)	United States	Los Angeles Kings (from Columbus via Ottawa and Toronto)^{13}	Des Moines Buccaneers (USHL)
84	Nico Daws (G)	Canada	New Jersey Devils (from Carolina)^{14}	Guelph Storm (OHL)
85	Maxim Groshev (RW)	Russia	Tampa Bay Lightning (from Philadelphia via San Jose)^{15}	Neftekhimik Nizhnekamsk (KHL)
86	Dylan Peterson (C)	United States	St. Louis Blues (from Washington via Montreal)^{16}	U.S. NTDP (USHL)
87	Justin Sourdif (RW)	Canada	Florida Panthers (from Colorado)^{17}	Vancouver Giants (WHL)
88	Leo Loof (D)	Sweden	St. Louis Blues	Farjestad Jr. (U20 SuperElit)
89	Trevor Kuntar (C)	United States	Boston Bruins	Boston College Eagles (H-East)
90	Alexander Ljungkrantz (LW)	Sweden	New York Islanders	Brynas Jr. (U20 SuperElit)
91	Jackson Hallum (C)	United States	Vegas Golden Knights	St. Thomas Academy Cadets (USHS-MN)
92	Oliver Tarnstrom (C)	Sweden	New York Rangers (from Dallas)^{18}	AIK Jr. (U20 SuperElit)
93	Jack Thompson (D)	Canada	Tampa Bay Lightning	Sudbury Wolves (OHL)

Notes

1. The Ottawa Senators' third-round pick went to the Toronto Maple Leafs as the result of a trade on October 7, 2020, that sent a second-round pick in 2020 (44th overall) to Ottawa in exchange for the Islanders' second-round pick in 2020 (59th overall) and this pick.
2. The San Jose Sharks' third-round pick went to the Minnesota Wild as the result of a trade on October 7, 2020, that sent a third and fifth-round pick both in 2020 (70th and 132nd overall) to Detroit in exchange for this pick.
  Detroit previously acquired this pick as the result of a trade on February 24, 2019, that sent Gustav Nyquist to San Jose in exchange for a conditional second-round pick in 2019 and this pick (being conditional at the time of the trade). The condition – Detroit will receive a third-round pick in 2020 if Nyquist does not re-sign with San Jose for the 2019–20 NHL season – was converted when Nyquist signed with Columbus on July 1, 2019.
3. The New Jersey Devils' third-round pick went to the Vegas Golden Knights as the result of a trade on July 29, 2019, that sent Nikita Gusev to New Jersey in exchange for a second-round pick in 2021 and this pick.
4. The Buffalo Sabres' third-round pick went to the Carolina Hurricanes as the result of a trade on August 2, 2018, that sent Jeff Skinner to Buffalo in exchange for Cliff Pu, a second-round pick in 2019, a sixth-round pick in 2020 and this pick.
5. The Minnesota Wild's third-round pick went to the Detroit Red Wings as the result of a trade on October 7, 2020, that sent San Jose's third-round pick in 2020 (65th overall) to Minnesota in exchange for a fifth-round pick in 2020 (132nd overall) and this pick.
  Minnesota previously re-acquired this pick as the result of a trade on October 7, 2020, that sent Luke Kunin and a fourth-round pick in 2020 (101st overall) to Nashville in exchange for Nick Bonino, New Jersey's second-round pick in 2020 (37th overall) and this pick.
  Nashville previously acquired this pick as the result of a trade on June 22, 2019, that sent Florida's third-round pick in 2019 to Minnesota in exchange for this pick.
6. The Winnipeg Jets' third-round pick went to the Ottawa Senators as the result of a trade on February 18, 2020, that sent Dylan DeMelo to Winnipeg in exchange for this pick.
7. The New York Rangers' third-round pick went to the Calgary Flames as the result of a trade on October 6, 2020, that sent a first-round pick in 2020 (19th overall) to the New York in exchange for Carolina's first-round pick in 2020 (22nd overall) and this pick.
8. The Toronto Maple Leafs' third-round pick went to the Colorado Avalanche as the result of a trade on July 1, 2019, that sent Tyson Barrie, Alexander Kerfoot and a sixth-round pick in 2020 to Toronto in exchange for Nazem Kadri, Calle Rosen and this pick.
9. The Edmonton Oilers' third-round pick went to the San Jose Sharks as the result of a trade on October 7, 2020, that sent Buffalo's fourth-round pick and Ottawa's fifth-round pick both in 2020 (100th and 126th overall) to Edmonton in exchange for this pick.
10. The Montreal Canadiens' third-round pick went to the Columbus Blue Jackets as the result of a trade on October 6, 2020, that sent Josh Anderson to Montreal in exchange for Max Domi and this pick.
11. The Arizona Coyotes' third-round pick went to the Calgary Flames as the result of a trade on October 6, 2020, that sent Carolina's first-round pick in 2020 (22nd overall) to Washington in exchange for a first-round pick in 2020 (24th overall) and this pick.
  Washington previously acquired this pick as the result of a trade on June 28, 2019, that sent Andre Burakovsky to Colorado in exchange for Scott Kosmachuk, a second-round pick in 2020 and this pick.
  Colorado previously acquired this pick as the result of a trade on June 25, 2019, that sent Carl Soderberg to Arizona in exchange for Kevin Connauton and this pick.
12. The Calgary Flames' third-round pick went to the Chicago Blackhawks as the result of a trade on February 24, 2020, that sent Erik Gustafsson to Calgary in exchange for this pick (being conditional at the time of the trade). The condition – Chicago will receive the higher of Calgary or Edmonton's third-round pick in 2020 if Calgary acquires the Oilers' third-round pick in 2020 – was converted when the Oilers elected to keep their third-round pick in 2020 on October 7, 2020.
13. The Columbus Blue Jackets' third-round pick went to the Los Angeles Kings as the result of a trade on February 5, 2020, that sent Jack Campbell and Kyle Clifford to Toronto in exchange for Trevor Moore, a conditional third-round pick in 2021 and this pick.
  Toronto previously acquired this pick as the result of a trade on July 1, 2019, that sent Nikita Zaitsev, Connor Brown and Michael Carcone to Ottawa in exchange for Cody Ceci, Ben Harpur, Aaron Luchuk and this pick.
  Ottawa previously acquired this pick as the result of a trade on February 26, 2018, that sent Ian Cole to Columbus in exchange for Nick Moutrey and this pick.
14. The Carolina Hurricanes' third-round pick went to the New Jersey Devils as the result of a trade on February 24, 2020, that sent Sami Vatanen to Carolina in exchange for Fredrik Claesson, Janne Kuokkanen and this pick (being conditional at the time of the trade). The condition – New Jersey will receive a third-round pick in 2020 if Vatanen plays in 70% of the Hurricanes' playoff games after the 2020 Eastern Conference qualifying round – was converted after Vatanen played in four of the five games for Carolina during the 2020 Eastern Conference first round that ended with the Hurricanes being eliminated on August 19, 2020.
15. The Philadelphia Flyers' third-round pick went to the Tampa Bay Lightning as the result of a trade on February 24, 2020, that sent Anthony Greco and a first-round pick in 2020 to San Jose in exchange for Barclay Goodrow and this pick.
  San Jose previously acquired this pick as the result of a trade on June 18, 2019, that sent Justin Braun to Philadelphia in exchange for a second-round pick in 2019 and this pick.
16. The Washington Capitals' third-round pick went to the St. Louis Blues as the result of a trade on September 2, 2020, that sent Jake Allen and a seventh-round pick in 2022 to Montreal in exchange for Chicago's seventh-round pick in 2020 and this pick.
  Montreal previously acquired this pick as the result of a trade on February 23, 2020, that sent Ilya Kovalchuk to Washington in exchange for this pick.
17. The Colorado Avalanche's third-round pick went to the Florida Panthers as the result of a trade on February 25, 2019, that sent Derick Brassard and a conditional sixth-round pick in 2020 to Colorado in exchange for this pick.
18. The Dallas Stars' third-round pick went to the New York Rangers as the result of a trade on February 23, 2019, that sent Mats Zuccarello to Dallas in exchange for a conditional second-round pick in 2019 and this pick (being conditional at the time of the trade). The condition – New York will receive a third-round pick in 2020 if Zuccarello does not re-sign with Dallas for the 2019–20 NHL season – was converted when Zuccarello signed with Minnesota on July 1, 2019.

=== Round four ===
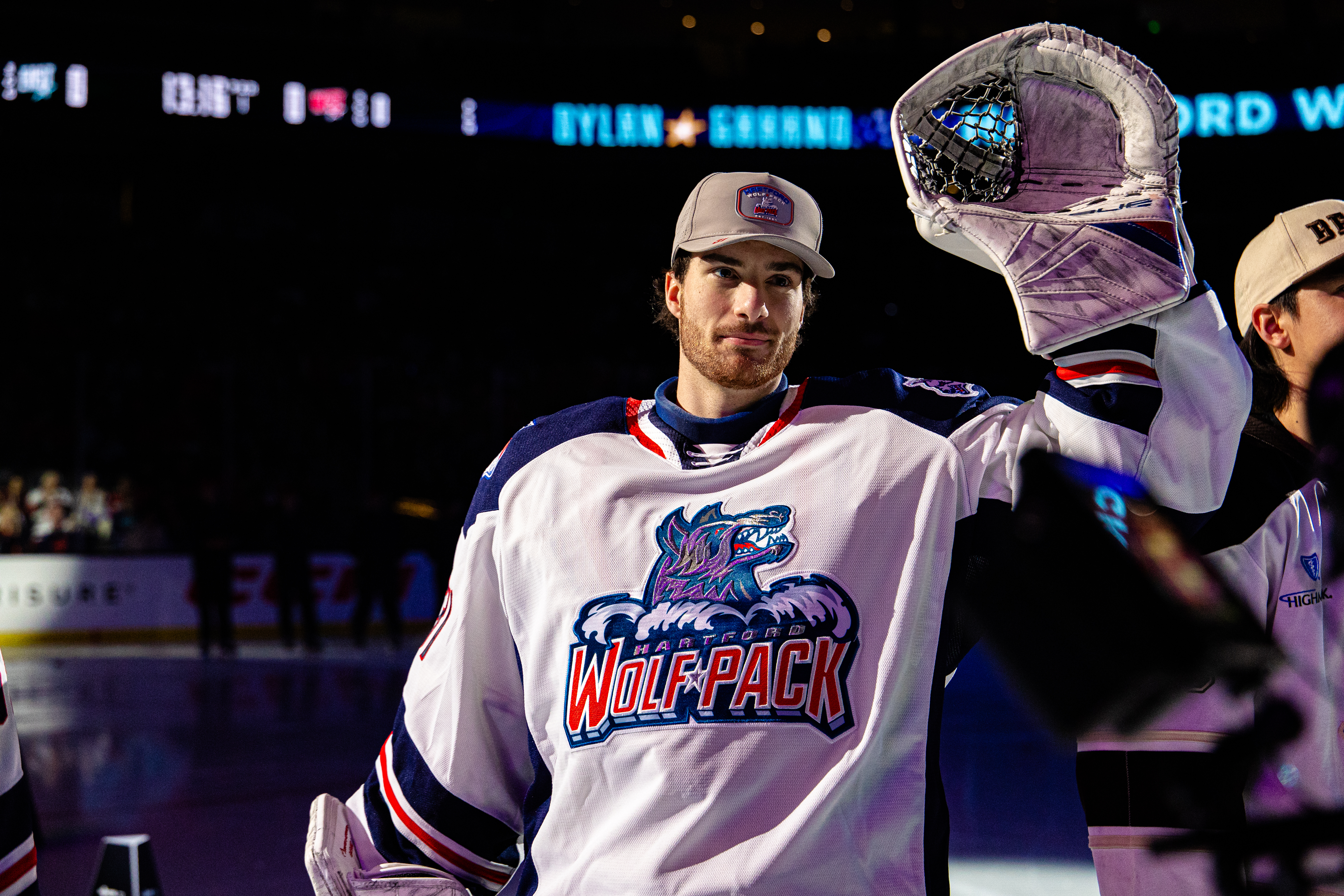
Dylan Garand was selected 103rd overall by the New York Rangers.

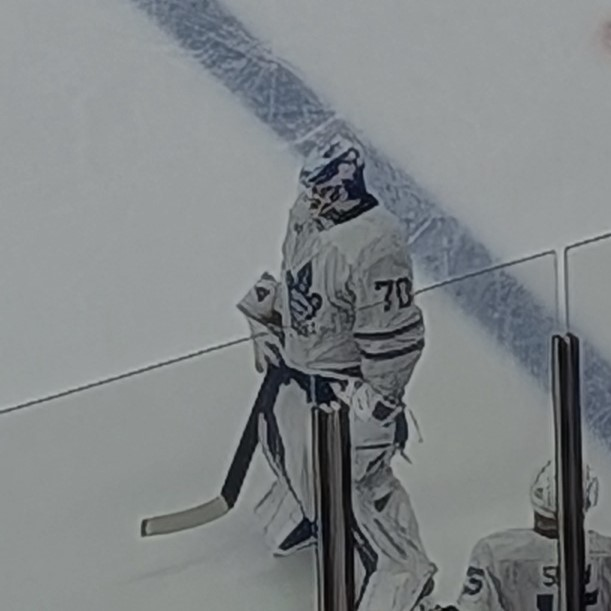
Artur Akhtyamov was selected 106th overall by the Toronto Maple Leafs.

Ethan Edwards was selected 120th overall by the New Jersey Devils.

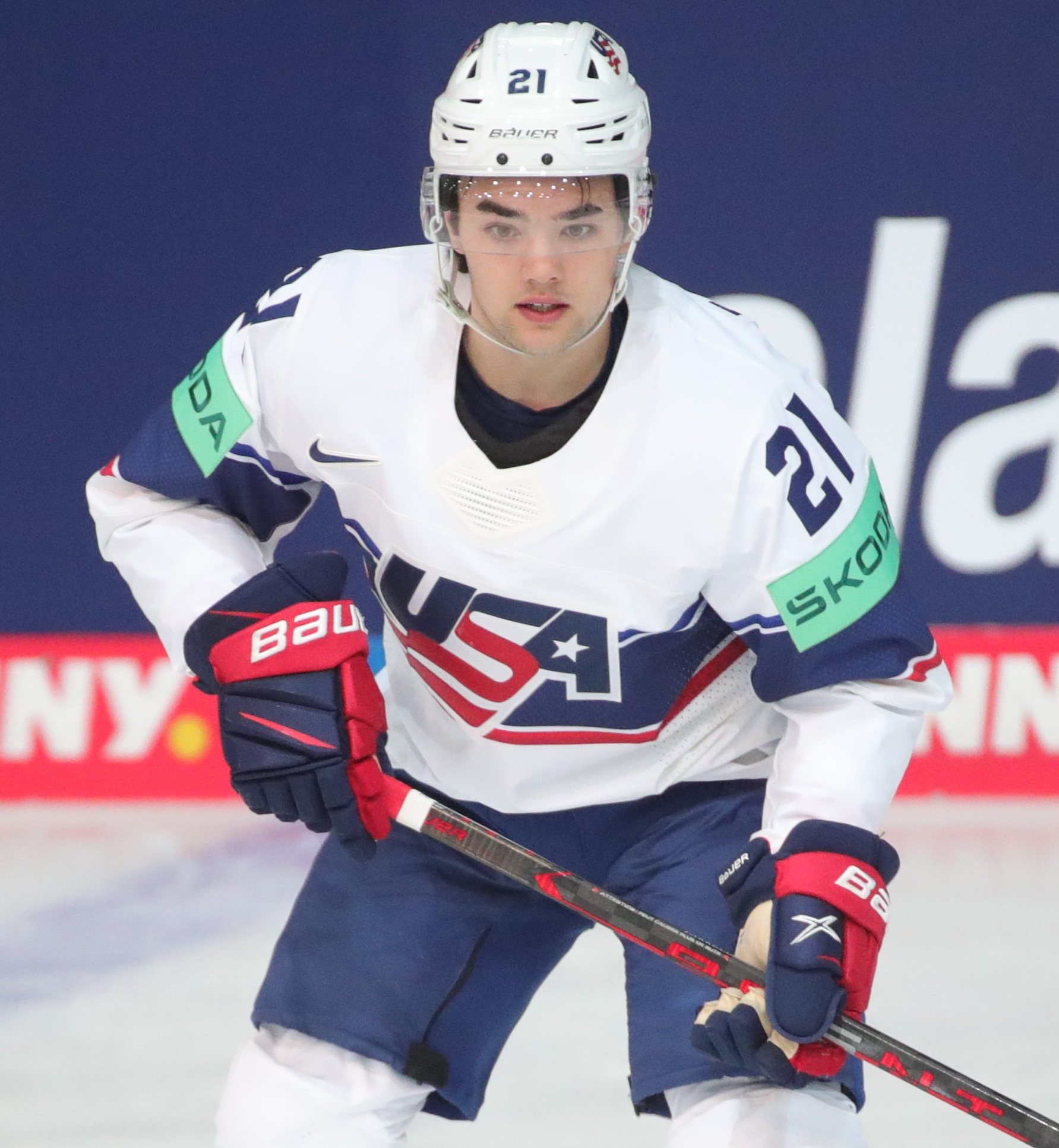
Sean Farrell was selected 124th overall by the Montreal Canadiens.

#	Player	Nationality	NHL team	College/junior/club team
94	Zayde Wisdom (RW)	Canada	Philadelphia Flyers (from Detroit via Tampa Bay)^{1}	Kingston Frontenacs (OHL)
95	Michael Benning (D)	Canada	Florida Panthers (from Ottawa)^{2}	Sherwood Park Crusaders (AJHL)
96	Daniil Chechelev (G)	Russia	Calgary Flames (from San Jose via Montreal and Buffalo)^{3}	Russkiye Vitazi Chekhov (MHL)
97	Sam Stange (RW)	United States	Detroit Red Wings (from Los Angeles)^{4}	Sioux Falls Stampede (USHL)
98	Brandon Coe (RW)	Canada	San Jose Sharks (from Anaheim via Montreal)^{5}	North Bay Battalion (OHL)
99	Jaromir Pytlik (C)	Czech Republic	New Jersey Devils	Sault Ste. Marie Greyhounds (OHL)
100	Carter Savoie (LW)	Canada	Edmonton Oilers (from Buffalo via San Jose)^{6}	Sherwood Park Crusaders (AJHL)
101	Adam Wilsby (D)	Sweden	Nashville Predators (from Minnesota)^{7}	Skelleftea AIK (SHL)
102	Jack Smith (RW)	United States	Montreal Canadiens (from Winnipeg)^{8}	Sioux Falls Stampede (USHL)
103	Dylan Garand (G)	Canada	New York Rangers	Kamloops Blazers (WHL)
104	Thimo Nickl (D)	Austria	Anaheim Ducks (from Nashville via Philadelphia)^{9}	Drummondville Voltigeurs (QMJHL)
105	Zachary Uens (D)	Canada	Florida Panthers	Merrimack Warriors (H-East)
106	Artur Akhtyamov (G)	Russia	Toronto Maple Leafs	Irbis Kazan (MHL)
107	Jan Bednar (G)	Czech Republic	Detroit Red Wings (from Edmonton)^{10}	Sokolov (Czech 1.liga)
108	Lukas Svejkovsky (C)	United States	Pittsburgh Penguins	Medicine Hat Tigers (WHL)
109	Blake Biondi (C)	United States	Montreal Canadiens	Hermantown Hawks (USHS-MN)
110	Michael Krutil (D)	Czech Republic	Chicago Blackhawks	Sparta Jr. (U20 Extraliga)
111	Mitchell Miller (D)	United States	Arizona Coyotes	Tri-City Storm (USHL)
112	Juho Markkanen (G)	Finland	Los Angeles Kings (from Calgary)^{11}	Kettera (Mestis)
113	Jackson Kunz (LW)	United States	Vancouver Canucks	Shattuck-St. Mary's Sabres (USHS-MN)
114	Mikael Pyyhtia (LW)	Finland	Columbus Blue Jackets	TPS U20 (Jr. SM-liiga)
115	Zion Nybeck (LW)	Sweden	Carolina Hurricanes	HV71 J20 (J20 SuperElit)
116	Eamon Powell (D)	United States	Tampa Bay Lightning (from Philadelphia)^{12}	U.S. NTDP (USHL)
117	Bogdan Trineyev (RW)	Russia	Washington Capitals	Dynamo Moscow 2 (MHL)
118	Colby Ambrosio (C)	Canada	Colorado Avalanche	Tri-City Storm (USHL)
119	Tanner Dickinson (C)	United States	St. Louis Blues	Sault Ste. Marie Greyhounds (OHL)
120	Ethan Edwards (D)	Canada	New Jersey Devils (from Boston)^{13}	Spruce Grove Saints (AJHL)
121	Alex Jefferies (LW)	United States	New York Islanders	Gunnery Highlanders (USHS-CT)
122	William Villeneuve (D)	Canada	Toronto Maple Leafs (from Vegas)^{14}	Saint John Sea Dogs (QMJHL)
123	Antonio Stranges (LW)	United States	Dallas Stars	London Knights (OHL)
124	Sean Farrell (C)	United States	Montreal Canadiens (from Tampa Bay)^{15}	Chicago Steel (USHL)

Notes

1. The Detroit Red Wings' fourth-round pick went to the Philadelphia Flyers as the result of a trade on October 7, 2020, that sent a fourth and fifth-round pick both in 2020 (116th and 147th overall) to Tampa Bay in exchange for this pick.
  Tampa Bay previously acquired this pick as the result of a trade on August 14, 2019, that sent Adam Erne to Detroit in exchange for this pick.
2. The Ottawa Senators' fourth-round pick went to the Florida Panthers as the result of a trade on October 2, 2020, that sent Josh Brown to Ottawa in exchange for this pick.
3. The San Jose Sharks' fourth-round pick went to the Calgary Flames as the result of a trade on January 2, 2020, that sent Michael Frolik to Buffalo in exchange for this pick.
  Buffalo previously acquired this pick as the result of a trade on January 2, 2020, that sent Marco Scandella to Montreal in exchange for this pick.
  Montreal previously acquired this pick as the result of a trade on June 22, 2019, that sent a fourth-round pick in 2019 to San Jose in exchange for this pick.
4. The Los Angeles Kings' fourth-round pick went to the Detroit Red Wings as the result of a trade on October 7, 2020, that sent Edmonton's second-round pick in 2020 (45th overall) to Los Angeles in exchange for Vancouver's second-round pick in 2020 (51st overall) and this pick.
5. The Anaheim Ducks' fourth-round pick went to the San Jose Sharks as the result of a trade on October 7, 2020, that sent Washington's third-round pick in 2021 to Montreal in exchange for this pick.
  Montreal previously acquired this pick as the result of a trade on June 30, 2019, that sent Nicolas Deslauriers to Anaheim in exchange for this pick.
6. The Buffalo Sabres' fourth-round pick went to the Edmonton Oilers as the result of a trade on October 7, 2020, that sent a third-round pick in 2020 (76th overall) to San Jose in exchange for Ottawa's fifth-round pick in 2020 (126th overall) and this pick.
  San Jose previously acquired this pick as the result of a trade on October 7, 2020, that sent a second-round pick in 2020 (34th overall) to Buffalo in exchange for a second-round pick in 2020 (38th overall) and this pick.
7. The Minnesota Wild's fourth-round pick went to the Nashville Predators as the result of a trade on October 7, 2020, that sent Nick Bonino, New Jersey's second-round pick and a third-round pick both in 2020 (37th and 70th overall) to Minnesota in exchange for Luke Kunin and this pick.
8. The Winnipeg Jets' fourth-round pick went to the Montreal Canadiens as the result of a trade on June 30, 2018, that sent Simon Bourque to Winnipeg in exchange for Steve Mason, Joel Armia, a seventh-round pick in 2019 and this pick.
9. The Nashville Predators' fourth-round pick went to the Anaheim Ducks as the result of a trade on February 24, 2020, that sent Derek Grant to Philadelphia in exchange for Kyle Criscuolo and this pick (being conditional at the time of the trade). The condition – Anaheim will receive the higher of Nashville or Philadelphia's fourth-round pick in 2020. – was converted when Nashville was eliminated from the 2020 Stanley Cup playoffs on August 7, 2020, ensuring that Nashville would select higher than Philadelphia.
  Philadelphia previously acquired this pick as the result of a trade on February 25, 2019, that sent Wayne Simmonds to Nashville in exchange for Ryan Hartman and this pick (being conditional at the time of the trade). The condition – Philadelphia will receive a fourth-round pick in 2020 if Nashville does not advance to the 2019 Western Conference second round – was converted on April 22, 2019, when Nashville was eliminated from the 2019 Stanley Cup playoffs.
10. The Edmonton Oilers' fourth-round pick went to the Detroit Red Wings as the result of a trade on February 23, 2020, that sent Mike Green to Edmonton in exchange for Kyle Brodziak and this pick (being conditional at the time of the trade). The condition – Detroit will receive a fourth-round pick in 2020 if Green does not play in at least 50% of the Oilers' 2020 Stanley Cup playoff games. – was converted on July 11, 2020, when Green informed the Oilers he would not participate in the 2020 Stanley Cup playoffs.
11. The Calgary Flames' fourth-round pick went to the Los Angeles Kings as the result of a trade on February 25, 2019, that sent Oscar Fantenberg to Calgary in exchange for this pick (being conditional at the time of the trade). The condition – Los Angeles will receive a fourth-round pick in 2020 if Calgary does not advance to the 2019 Western Conference Finals – was converted on April 19, 2019, when Calgary was eliminated from the 2019 Stanley Cup playoffs.
12. The Philadelphia Flyers' fourth-round pick went to the Tampa Bay Lightning as the result of a trade on October 7, 2020, that sent Detroit's fourth-round pick in 2020 (94th overall) to Philadelphia in exchange for a fifth-round pick in 2020 (147th overall) and this pick.
13. The Boston Bruins' fourth-round pick went to the New Jersey Devils as the result of a trade on February 25, 2019, that sent Marcus Johansson to Boston in exchange for a second-round pick in 2019 and this pick.
14. The Vegas Golden Knights' fourth-round pick went to the Toronto Maple Leafs as the result of a trade on July 23, 2019, that sent Garret Sparks to Vegas in exchange for David Clarkson and this pick.
15. The Tampa Bay Lightning's fourth-round pick went to the Montreal Canadiens as the result of a trade on October 7, 2020, that sent St. Louis' second-round pick in 2020 (57th overall) to Tampa Bay in exchange for a second-round pick in 2021 and this pick.

=== Round five ===
Jacob Truscott was selected 144th overall by the Vancouver Canucks.

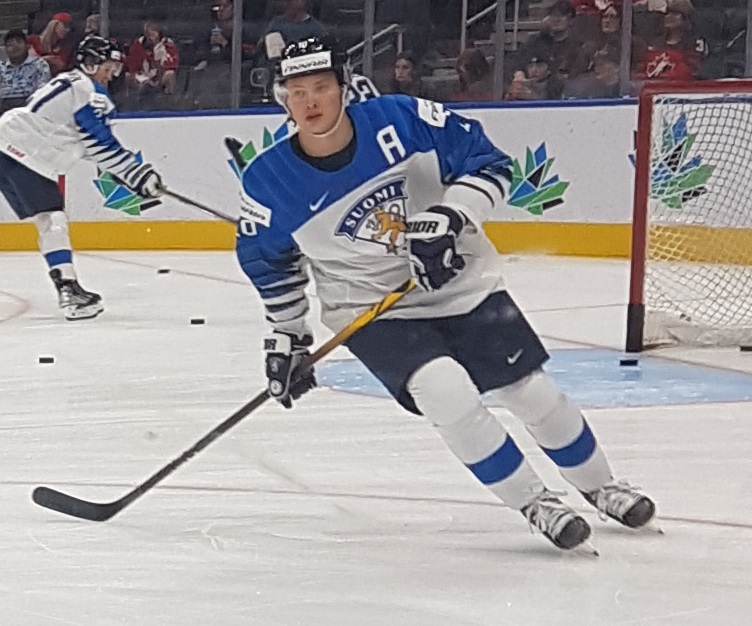
Kasper Puutio was selected 153rd overall by the Florida Panthers.

#	Player	Nationality	NHL team	College/junior/club team
125	Jesper Vikman (G)	Sweden	Vegas Golden Knights (from Detroit)^{1}	AIK Jr. (U20 SuperElit)
126	Tyler Tullio (RW)	Canada	Edmonton Oilers (from Ottawa via San Jose)^{2}	Oshawa Generals (OHL)
127	Evan Vierling (C)	Canada	New York Rangers (from San Jose)^{3}	Barrie Colts (OHL)
128	Martin Chromiak (RW)	Slovakia	Los Angeles Kings	Kingston Frontenacs (OHL)
129	Artyom Galimov (C)	Russia	Anaheim Ducks	Ak Bars Kazan (KHL)
130	Artem Shlaine (C)	Russia	New Jersey Devils	Shattuck-St. Mary's Sabres (USHS-MN)
131	Matteo Costantini (C)	Canada	Buffalo Sabres	Buffalo Jr. Sabres (OJHL)
132	Alex Cotton (D)	Canada	Detroit Red Wings (from Minnesota)^{4}	Lethbridge Hurricanes (WHL)
133	Anton Johannesson (D)	Sweden	Winnipeg Jets	HV71 J20 (U20 SuperElit)
134	Brett Berard (LW)	United States	New York Rangers	U.S. NTDP (USHL)
135	Elliot Desnoyers (LW)	Canada	Philadelphia Flyers (from Nashville)^{5}	Halifax Mooseheads (QMJHL)
136	Jakub Dobes (G)	Czech Republic	Montreal Canadiens (from Florida)^{6}	Omaha Lancers (USHL)
137	Dmitry Ovchinnikov (C)	Russia	Toronto Maple Leafs (from Toronto via Florida)^{7}	Novosibirsk 2 (MHL)
138	Maksim Berezkin (LW)	Russia	Edmonton Oilers	Yaroslavl 2 (MHL)
139	Ryder Rolston (RW)	United States	Colorado Avalanche (from Pittsburgh)^{8}	Waterloo Black Hawks (USHL)
140	Ben Meehan (D)	United States	Los Angeles Kings (from Montreal via Carolina)^{9}	UMass Lowell River Hawks (H-East)
141	Isaak Phillips (D)	Canada	Chicago Blackhawks	Sudbury Wolves (OHL)
142	Carson Bantle (LW)	United States	Arizona Coyotes	Madison Capitols (USHL)
143	Ryan Francis (RW)	Canada	Calgary Flames	Cape Breton Eagles (QMJHL)
144	Jacob Truscott (D)	United States	Vancouver Canucks	U.S. NTDP (USHL)
145	Ole Julian Holm (D)	Norway	Columbus Blue Jackets	Mississauga Steelheads (OHL)
146	Pavel Novak (RW)	Czech Republic	Minnesota Wild (from Carolina via St. Louis)^{10}	Kelowna Rockets (WHL)
147	Jaydon Dureau (LW)	Canada	Tampa Bay Lightning (from Philadelphia)^{11}	Portland Winterhawks (WHL)
148	Bear Hughes (D)	United States	Washington Capitals	Spokane Chiefs (WHL)
149	Raivis Ansons (RW)	Latvia	Pittsburgh Penguins (from Colorado)^{12}	Baie-Comeau Drakkar (QMJHL)
150	Matthew Kessel (D)	United States	St. Louis Blues	UMass Minutemen (Hockey East)
151	Mason Langenbrunner (D)	United States	Boston Bruins	Sioux City Musketeers (USHL)
152	William Dufour (RW)	Canada	New York Islanders	Drummondville Voltigeurs (QMJHL)
153	Kasper Puutio (D)	Finland	Florida Panthers (from Vegas via Toronto)^{13}	Everett Silvertips (WHL)
154	Daniel Ljungman (C)	Sweden	Dallas Stars	Linkoping J20 (J20 SuperElit)
155	Eric Engstrand (LW)	Sweden	Ottawa Senators (from Tampa Bay)^{14}	Malmo Redhawks (SHL)

Notes

1. The Detroit Red Wings' fifth-round pick went to the Vegas Golden Knights as the result of a trade on October 7, 2020, that sent a fourth-round pick in 2022 to Detroit in exchange for this pick.
2. The Ottawa Senators' fifth-round pick went to the Edmonton Oilers as the result of a trade on October 7, 2020, that sent a third-round pick in 2020 (76th overall) to San Jose in exchange for Buffalo's fourth-round pick in 2020 (100th overall) and this pick.
  San Jose previously acquired this pick as the result of a trade on June 19, 2018, that sent Mikkel Boedker, Julius Bergman and a sixth-round pick in 2020 to Ottawa in exchange for Mike Hoffman, Cody Donaghey and this pick.
3. The San Jose Sharks' fifth-round pick went to the New York Rangers as the result of a trade on October 7, 2020, that sent a seventh-round pick and Vancouver's seventh-round pick both in 2020 (196th and 206th overall) to San Jose in exchange for this pick.
4. The Minnesota Wild's fifth-round pick went to the Detroit Red Wings as the result of a trade on October 7, 2020, that sent San Jose's third-round pick in 2020 (65th overall) to Minnesota in exchange for a third-round pick in 2020 (70th overall) and this pick.
5. The Nashville Predators' fifth-round pick went to the Philadelphia Flyers as the result of a trade on October 7, 2020, that sent a seventh-round pick and Montreal's seventh-round pick both in 2020 (202nd and 209th overall) to San Jose in exchange for this pick.
6. The Florida Panthers' fifth-round pick went to the Montreal Canadiens as the result of a trade on June 22, 2019, that sent Chicago's fifth-round pick in 2019 to Florida in exchange for this pick.
7. The Toronto Maple Leafs' fifth-round pick was re-acquired as the result of a trade on October 7, 2020, that sent Vegas' fifth-round pick and St. Louis' seventh-round pick both in 2020 (153rd and 212th overall) to Florida in exchange for this pick.
  Florida previously acquired this pick as the result of a trade on December 29, 2018, that sent Michael Hutchinson to Toronto in exchange for this pick.
8. The Pittsburgh Penguins' fifth-round pick went to the Colorado Avalanche as the result of a trade on October 7, 2020, that sent a fifth and seventh-round pick both in 2020 (149th and 211th overall) to Pittsburgh in exchange for this pick.
9. The Montreal Canadiens fifth-round pick went to the Los Angeles Kings as the result of a trade on October 7, 2020, that sent a sixth-round pick in 2020 (159th overall) and a seventh-round pick in 2021 to Carolina in exchange for this pick.
  Carolina previously acquired this pick as the result of a trade on September 12, 2020, that sent Joel Edmundson to Montreal in exchange for this pick.
10. The Carolina Hurricanes' fifth-round pick went to the Minnesota Wild as the result of a trade on October 7, 2020, that sent a sixth and seventh-round pick both in 2020 (163rd and 194th overall) to St. Louis in exchange for this pick.
  St. Louis previously acquired this pick as the result of a trade on September 24, 2019, that sent Joel Edmundson, Dominik Bokk and a seventh-round pick in 2021 to Carolina in exchange for Justin Faulk and this pick.
11. The Philadelphia Flyers' fifth-round pick went to the Tampa Bay Lightning as the result of a trade on October 7, 2020, that sent Detroit's fourth-round pick in 2020 (94th overall) to Philadelphia in exchange for a fourth-round pick in 2020 (116th overall) and this pick.
12. The Colorado Avalanche's fifth-round pick went to the Pittsburgh Penguins as the result of a trade on October 7, 2020, that sent a fifth-round pick in 2020 (139th overall) to Colorado in exchange for a seventh-round pick in 2020 (211th overall) and this pick.
13. The Vegas Golden Knights' fifth-round pick went to the Florida Panthers as the result of a trade on October 7, 2020, that sent Toronto's fifth-round pick in 2020 (137th overall) to Toronto in exchange for St. Louis' seventh-round pick in 2020 (212th overall) and this pick.
  Toronto previously acquired this pick as the result of a trade on February 24, 2020, that sent Robin Lehner to Vegas in exchange for this pick.
14. The Tampa Bay Lightning's fifth-round pick went to the Ottawa Senators as the result of a trade on July 30, 2019, that sent Mike Condon and a sixth-round pick in 2020 to Tampa Bay in exchange for Ryan Callahan and this pick.

=== Round six ===
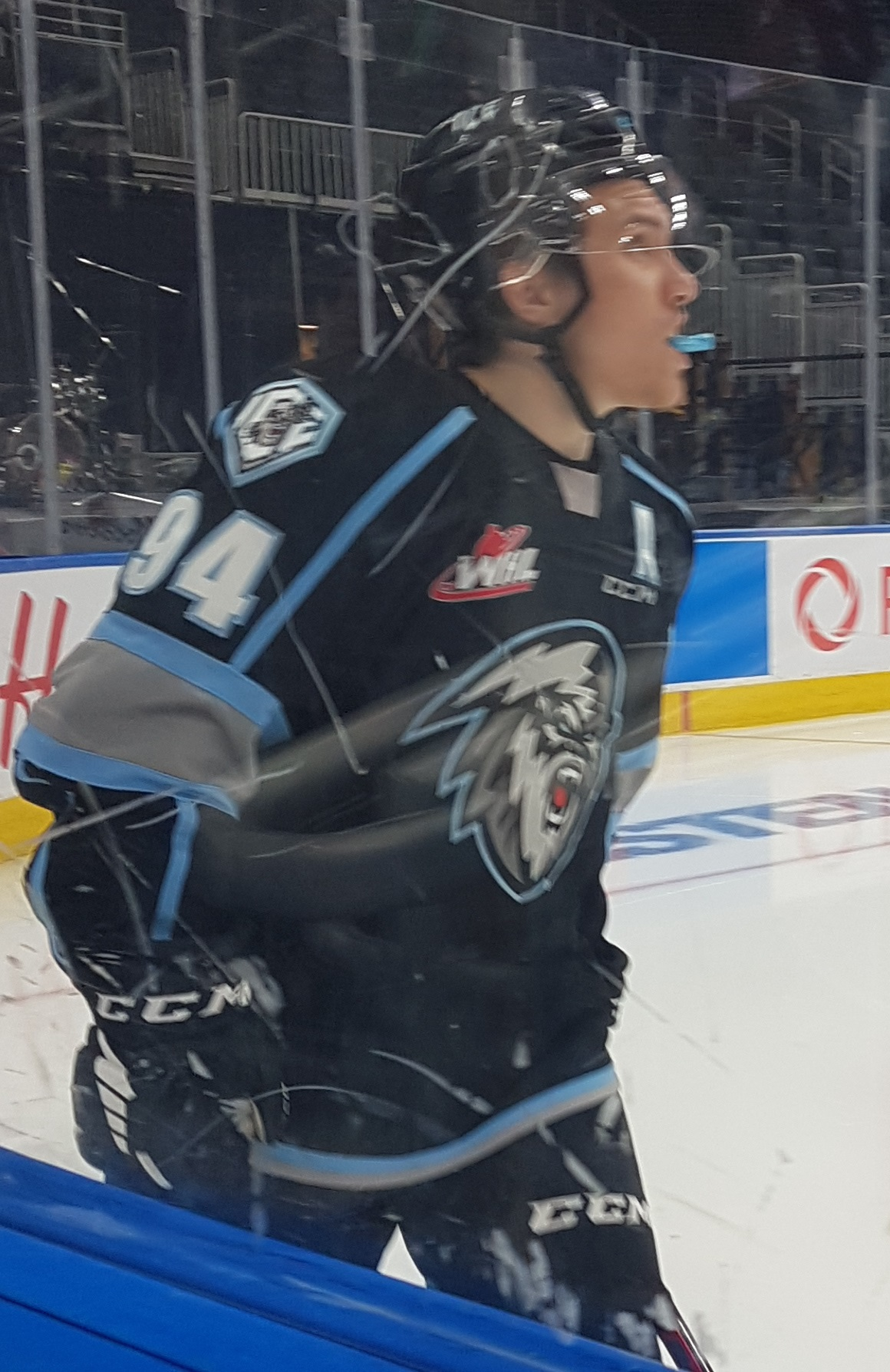
Connor McClennon was selected 178th overall by the Philadelphia Flyers.

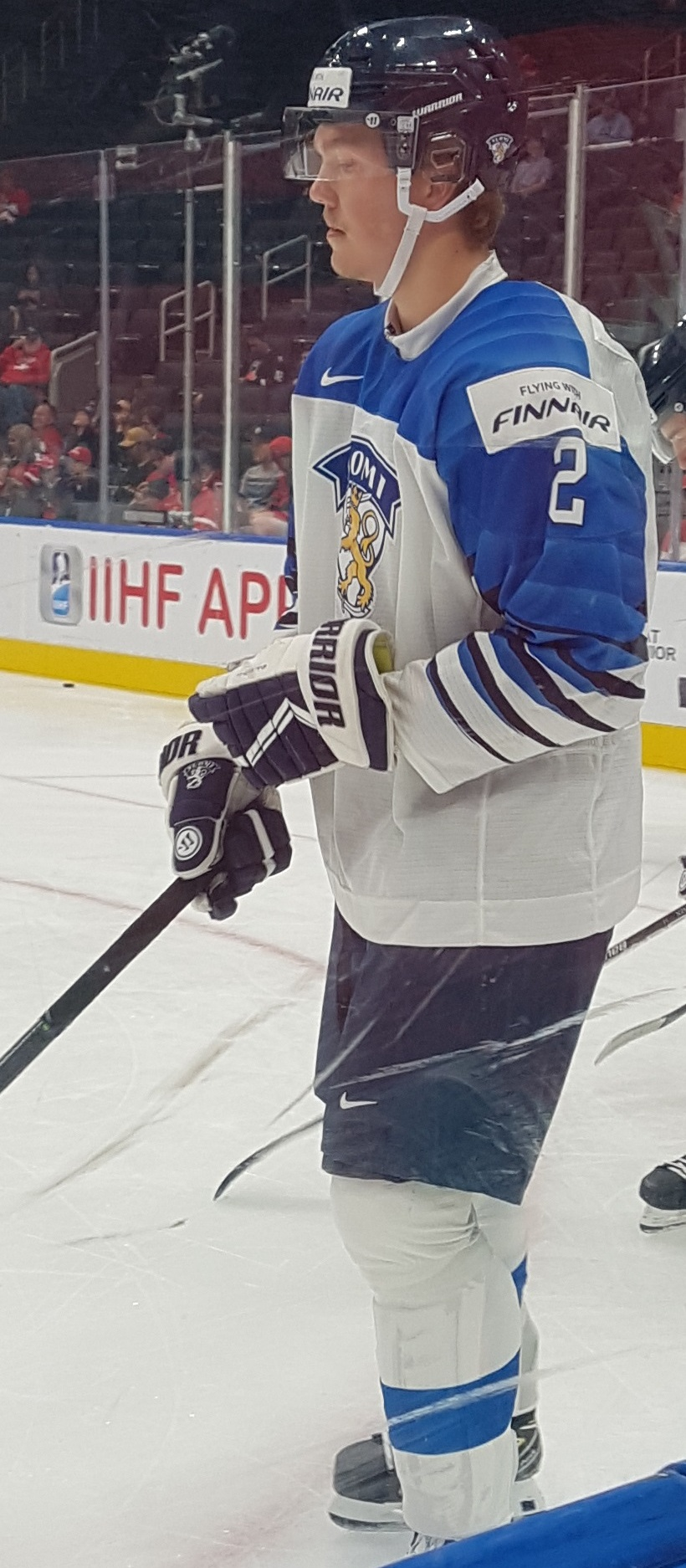
Matias Rajaniemi was selected 183rd overall by the New York Islanders.

#	Player	Nationality	NHL team	College/junior/club team
156	Kyle Aucoin (D)	Canada	Detroit Red Wings	Tri-City Storm (USHL)
157	Nick Capone (RW)	United States	Tampa Bay Lightning (from Ottawa)^{1}	Tri-City Storm (USHL)
158	Philippe Daoust (C)	Canada	Ottawa Senators (from San Jose)^{2}	Moncton Wildcats (QMJHL)
159	Lucas Mercuri (C)	Canada	Carolina Hurricanes (from Los Angeles)^{3}	Salisbury Knights (USHS-CT)
160	Albin Sundsvik (C)	Sweden	Anaheim Ducks	Skelleftea AIK (SHL)
161	Benjamin Baumgartner (C)	Austria	New Jersey Devils	HC Davos (Switzerland)
162	Yevgeni Oksentyuk (LW)	Belarus	Dallas Stars (from Buffalo via Carolina and Florida)^{4}	Flint Firebirds (OHL)
163	Will Cranley (G)	Canada	St. Louis Blues (from Minnesota)^{5}	Ottawa 67's (OHL)
164	Tyrel Bauer (D)	Canada	Winnipeg Jets	Seattle Thunderbirds (WHL)
165	Matt Rempe (C)	Canada	New York Rangers	Seattle Thunderbirds (WHL)
166	Luke Reid (D)	Canada	Nashville Predators	Chicago Steel (USHL)
167	Nils Aman (C)	Sweden	Colorado Avalanche (from Florida)^{6}	Leksands IF (SHL)
168	Veeti Miettinen (RW)	Finland	Toronto Maple Leafs	K-Espoo U20 (Jr. SM-liiga)
169	Filip Engaras (C)	Sweden	Edmonton Oilers	New Hampshire Wildcats (H-East)
170	Chase Yoder (C)	United States	Pittsburgh Penguins	U.S. NTDP (USHL)
171	Alexander Gordin (RW)	Russia	Montreal Canadiens	Neva St. Petersburg (VHL)
172	Chad Yetman (C)	Canada	Chicago Blackhawks	Erie Otters (OHL)
173	Filip Barklund (C)	Sweden	Arizona Coyotes	Orebro Jr. (J20 SuperElit)
174	Rory Kerins (C)	Canada	Calgary Flames	Sault Ste. Marie Greyhounds (OHL)
175	Dmitry Zlodeyev (C)	Russia	Vancouver Canucks	Dynamo Moscow 2 (MHL)
176	Samuel Johannesson (D)	Sweden	Columbus Blue Jackets	Rogle BK (SHL)
177	Axel Rindell (D)	Finland	Toronto Maple Leafs (from Carolina)^{7}	Jukurit (Liiga)
178	Connor McClennon (RW)	Canada	Philadelphia Flyers	Winnipeg Ice (WHL)
179	Garin Bjorklund (G)	Canada	Washington Capitals	Medicine Hat Tigers (WHL)
180	Joe Miller (C)	United States	Toronto Maple Leafs (from Colorado)^{8}	Chicago Steel (USHL)
181	Cole Reinhardt (LW)	Canada	Ottawa Senators (from St. Louis via Edmonton)^{9}	Brandon Wheat Kings (WHL)
182	Riley Duran (C)	United States	Boston Bruins	Lawrence Academy Spartans (USHS-MA)
183	Matias Rajaniemi (D)	Finland	New York Islanders	Lahti Pelicans (Liiga)
184	Noah Ellis (D)	United States	Vegas Golden Knights	Des Moines Buccaneers (USHL)
185	Remi Poirier (G)	Canada	Dallas Stars	Gatineau Olympiques (QMJHL)
186	Amir Miftakhov (G)	Russia	Tampa Bay Lightning	Ak Bars Kazan (KHL)

Notes

1. The Ottawa Senators' sixth-round pick went to the Tampa Bay Lightning as the result of a trade on July 30, 2019, that sent Ryan Callahan and a fifth-round pick in 2020 to Ottawa in exchange for Mike Condon and this pick.
2. The San Jose Sharks' sixth-round pick went to the Ottawa Senators as the result of a trade on June 19, 2018, that sent Mike Hoffman, Cody Donaghey and a fifth-round pick in 2020 to San Jose in exchange for Mikkel Boedker, Julius Bergman and this pick.
3. The Los Angeles Kings' sixth-round pick went to the Carolina Hurricanes as the result of a trade on October 7, 2020, that sent Montreal's fifth-round pick in 2020 (140th overall) to Los Angeles in exchange for a seventh-round pick in 2021 and this pick.
4. The Buffalo Sabres' sixth-round pick went to the Dallas Stars as the result of a trade on February 24, 2020, that sent Emil Djuse to Florida in exchange for this pick.
  Florida previously acquired this pick as the result of a trade on June 30, 2019, that sent James Reimer to Carolina in exchange for Scott Darling and this pick.
  Carolina previously acquired this pick as the result of a trade on August 2, 2018, that sent Jeff Skinner to Buffalo in exchange for Cliff Pu, a second-round pick in 2019, a third-round pick in 2020 and this pick.
5. The Minnesota Wild's sixth-round pick went to the St. Louis Blues as the result of a trade on October 7, 2020, that sent Carolina's fifth-round pick in 2020 (146th overall) to Minnesota in exchange for a seventh-round pick in 2020 (194th overall) and this pick.
6. The Florida Panthers' sixth-round pick went to the Colorado Avalanche as the result of a trade on February 25, 2019, that sent a third-round pick in 2020 to Florida in exchange for Derick Brassard and this pick (being conditional at the time of the trade). The condition - Colorado will receive a sixth-round pick in 2020 if Brassard does not re-sign with the Avalanche for the 2019–20 NHL season - was converted on August 21, 2019, when Brassard signed with the New York Islanders.
7. The Carolina Hurricanes' sixth-round pick went to the Toronto Maple Leafs as the result of a trade on June 22, 2019, that sent Patrick Marleau, a conditional first-round pick in 2020 and a seventh-round pick in 2020 to Carolina in exchange for this pick.
8. The Colorado Avalanche's sixth-round pick went to the Toronto Maple Leafs as the result of a trade on July 1, 2019, that sent Nazem Kadri, Calle Rosen and a third-round pick in 2020 to Colorado in exchange for Tyson Barrie, Alexander Kerfoot and this pick.
9. The St. Louis Blues' sixth-round pick went to the Ottawa Senators as the result of a trade on November 22, 2018, that sent Chris Wideman to Edmonton in exchange for this pick.
  Edmonton previously acquired this pick in a trade on October 1, 2018, that sent Jakub Jerabek to St. Louis in exchange for this pick (being conditional at the time of the trade). The condition – Edmonton will receive a sixth-round pick in 2020 if Jerabek plays in less than 50 games during the 2018–19 NHL season – was converted on December 22, 2018.

=== Round seven ===
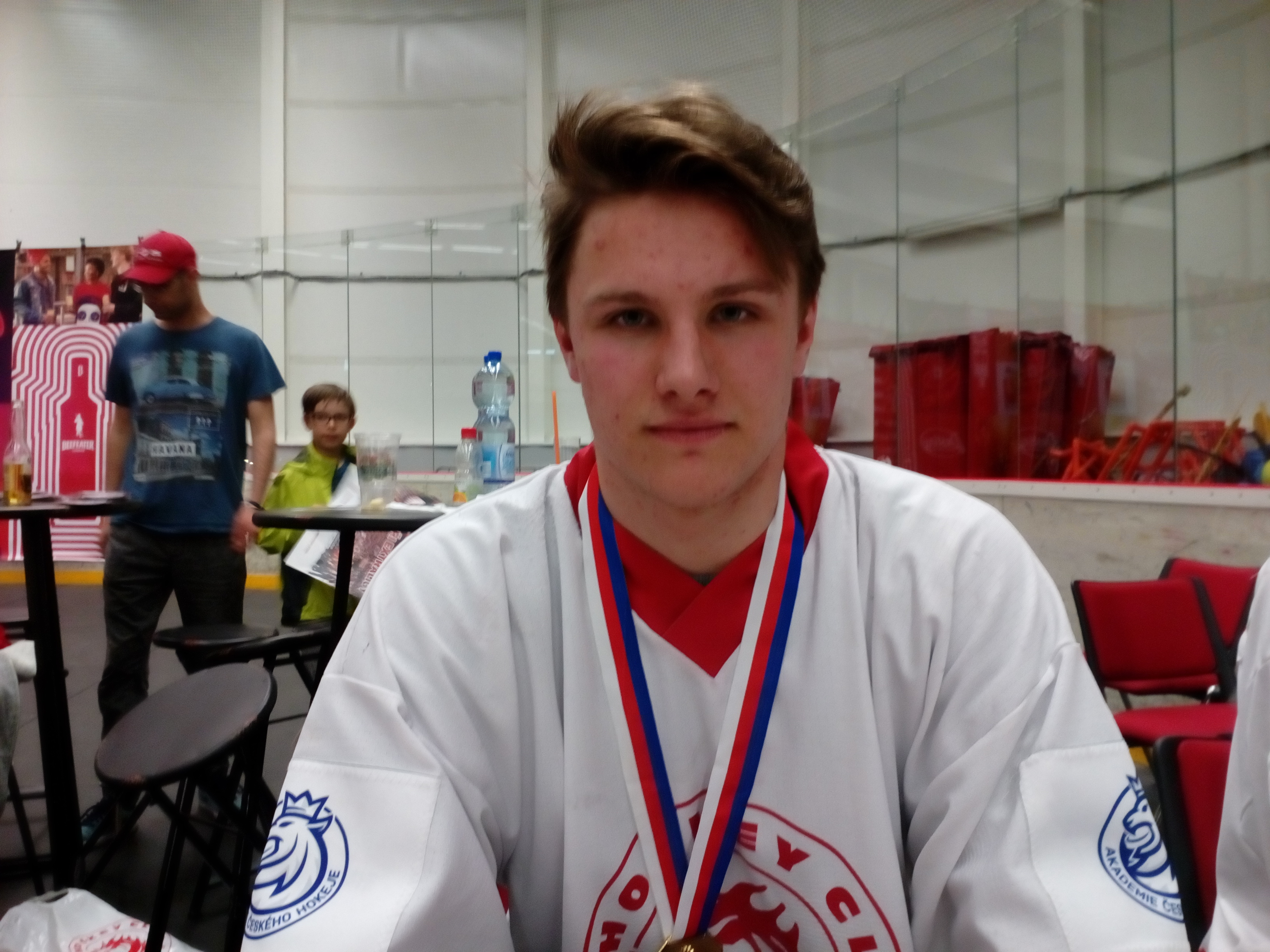
Adam Raska was selected 201st overall by the San Jose Sharks.

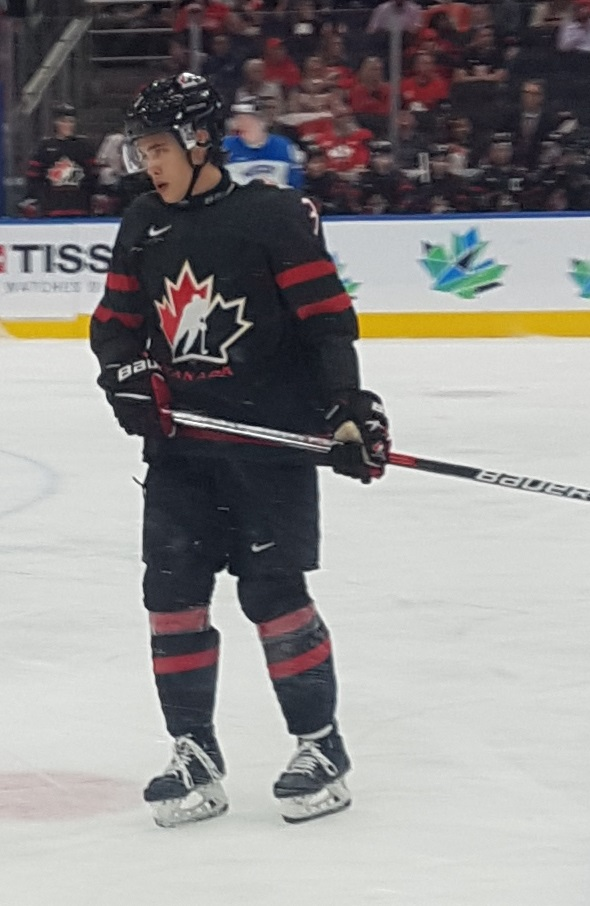
Ronan Seeley was selected 208th overall by the Carolina Hurricanes.

#	Player	Nationality	NHL team	College/junior/club team
187	Kienan Draper (RW)	United States	Detroit Red Wings	Chilliwack Chiefs (BCHL)
188	Louis Crevier (D)	Canada	Chicago Blackhawks (from Ottawa via Montreal)^{1}	Chicoutimi Saugneens (QMJHL)
189	John Fusco (D)	United States	Toronto Maple Leafs (from San Jose)^{2}	Harvard Crimson (ECAC)
190	Aatu Jamsen (RW)	Finland	Los Angeles Kings	Lahti Pelicans U20 (Jr. SM-liiga)
191	Viktor Persson (D)	Sweden	Vancouver Canucks (from Anaheim)^{3}	Kamloops Blazers (WHL)
192	Elliot Ekefjard (RW)	Sweden	Arizona Coyotes (from New Jersey)^{4}	Malmo J20 (J20 SuperElit)
193	Albert Lyckasen (D)	Sweden	Buffalo Sabres	Vita Hasten (HockeyAllsvenskan)
194	Noah Beck (D)	Canada	St. Louis Blues (from Minnesota)^{5}	Fargo Force (USHL)
195	Wyatt Schingoethe (C)	United States	Toronto Maple Leafs (from Winnipeg via Minnesota)^{6}	Waterloo Black Hawks (USHL)
196	Alex Young (C)	Canada	San Jose Sharks (from NY Rangers)^{7}	Colgate Raiders (ECAC)
197	Hugo Ollas (G)	Sweden	New York Rangers (from Nashville)^{8}	Linkoping J20 (J20 SuperElit)
198	Elliot Ekmark (C)	Sweden	Florida Panthers	Linkoping J20 (J20 SuperElit)
199	Alexander Pashin (RW)	Russia	Carolina Hurricanes (from Toronto)^{9}	Ufa 2 (MHL)
200	Jeremias Lindewall (RW)	Sweden	Edmonton Oilers	Modo J20 (J20 SuperElit)
201	Adam Raska (RW)	Czech Republic	San Jose Sharks (from Pittsburgh)^{10}	Rimouski Oceanic (QMJHL)
202	Gunnarwolfe Fontaine (LW)	United States	Nashville Predators (from Montreal via Philadelphia)^{11}	Northeastern Huskies (H-East)
203	Chase Bradley (LW)	United States	Detroit Red Wings (from Chicago via Montreal and St. Louis)^{12}	Sioux City Musketeers (USHL)
204	Ben McCartney (LW)	Canada	Arizona Coyotes	Brandon Wheat Kings (WHL)
205	Ilya Solovyov (D)	Belarus	Calgary Flames	Saginaw Spirit (OHL)
206	Linus Oberg (C)	Sweden	San Jose Sharks (from Vancouver via NY Rangers)^{13}	Orebro HK (SHL)
207	Ethan Bowen (C)	Canada	Anaheim Ducks (from Columbus)^{14}	Chilliwack Chiefs (BCHL)
208	Ronan Seeley (D)	Canada	Carolina Hurricanes	Everett Silvertips (WHL)
209	Chase McLane (C)	United States	Nashville Predators (from Philadelphia)^{15}	Penn State Nittany Lions (Big Ten)
210	Timofey Spitserov (RW)	Russia	San Jose Sharks (from Washington)^{16}	Muskegon Lumberjacks (USHL)
211	Oskar Magnusson (LW)	Sweden	Washington Capitals (from Colorado via Pittsburgh)^{17}	Malmo Redhawks (SHL)
212	Devon Levi (G)	Canada	Florida Panthers (from St. Louis via Toronto)^{18}	Carleton Place Canadians (CCHL)
213	Ryan Tverberg (C)	Canada	Toronto Maple Leafs (from Boston)^{19}	Toronto Jr. Canadiens (OJHL)
214	Henrik Tikkanen (G)	Finland	New York Islanders	IPK (Mestis)
215	Maxim Marushev (C)	Russia	Vegas Golden Knights	Bars Kazan (VHL)
216	Jakub Konecny (C)	Czech Republic	Buffalo Sabres (from Dallas)^{20}	Sparta Jr. (U20 Extraliga)
217	Declan McDonnell (RW)	United States	Tampa Bay Lightning	Kitchener Rangers (OHL)

Notes

1. The Ottawa Senators' seventh-round pick went to the Chicago Blackhawks as the result of a trade on October 7, 2020, that sent Montreal's seventh-round pick in 2021 to Montreal in exchange for this pick.
  Montreal previously acquired this pick as the result of a trade on February 24, 2020, that sent Matthew Peca to Ottawa in exchange for Aaron Luchuk and this pick.
2. The San Jose Sharks' seventh-round pick went to the Toronto Maple Leafs as the result of a trade on February 20, 2018, that sent Eric Fehr to San Jose in exchange for this pick.
3. The Anaheim Ducks' seventh-round pick went to the Vancouver Canucks as the result of a trade on January 16, 2019, that sent Michael Del Zotto to Anaheim in exchange for Luke Schenn and this pick.
4. The New Jersey Devils' seventh-round pick went to the Arizona Coyotes as the result of a trade on October 7, 2020, that sent a seventh-round pick in 2021 to New Jersey in exchange for this pick.
5. The Minnesota Wild's seventh-round pick went to the St. Louis Blues as the result of a trade on October 7, 2020, that sent Carolina's fifth-round pick in 2020 (146th overall) to Minnesota in exchange for a sixth-round pick in 2020 (163rd overall) and this pick.
6. The Winnipeg Jets' seventh-round pick went to the Toronto Maple Leafs as the result of a trade on May 30, 2019, that sent Fedor Gordeev to Minnesota in exchange for this pick (being conditional at the time of the trade). The condition – Toronto will receive Winnipeg's seventh-round pick in 2020 if Gordeev signs with the Wild before June 1, 2019 – was converted on May 30, 2019.
  Minnesota previously acquired this pick as the result of a trade on February 25, 2019, that sent Matt Hendricks to Winnipeg in exchange for this pick.
7. The New York Rangers' seventh-round pick went to the San Jose Sharks as the result of a trade on October 7, 2020, that sent a fifth-round pick in 2020 (127th overall) to New York in exchange for Vancouver's seventh-round pick in 2020 (206th overall) and this pick.
8. The Nashville Predators' seventh-round pick went to the New York Rangers as the result of a trade on February 6, 2019, that sent Cody McLeod to Nashville in exchange for this pick.
9. The Toronto Maple Leafs' seventh-round pick went to the Carolina Hurricanes as the result of a trade on June 22, 2019, that sent a sixth-round pick in 2020 to Toronto in exchange for Patrick Marleau, a conditional first-round pick in 2020 and this pick.
10. The Pittsburgh Penguins' seventh-round pick went to the San Jose Sharks as the result of a trade on June 22, 2019, that sent a seventh-round pick in 2019 to Pittsburgh in exchange for this pick.
11. The Montreal Canadiens' seventh-round pick went to the Nashville Predators as the result of a trade on October 7, 2020, that sent a fifth-round pick in 2020 (135th overall) to Philadelphia in exchange for a seventh-round pick in 2020 (209th overall) and this pick.
  Philadelphia previously acquired this pick as the result of a trade on June 22, 2019, that sent Montreal's seventh-round pick in 2019 to Montreal in exchange for this pick.
12. The Chicago Blackhawks' seventh-round pick went to the Detroit Red Wings as the result of a trade on October 7, 2020, that sent a seventh-round pick in 2021 to St. Louis in exchange for this pick.
  St. Louis previously acquired this pick as the result of a trade on September 2, 2020, that sent Jake Allen and a seventh-round pick in 2022 to Montreal in exchange for Washington's third-round pick in 2020 and this pick.
  Montreal previously acquired this pick as the result of a trade on June 30, 2019, that sent Andrew Shaw and a seventh-round pick in 2021 to Chicago in exchange for a second-round pick in 2020, a third-round pick in 2021 and this pick.
13. The Vancouver Canucks' seventh-round pick went to the San Jose Sharks as the result of a trade on October 7, 2020, that sent a fifth-round pick in 2020 (127th overall) to the New York Rangers in exchange for a seventh-round pick in 2020 (196th overall) and this pick.
  The Rangers previously acquired this pick as the result of a trade on February 12, 2019, that sent Marek Mazanec to Vancouver in exchange for this pick.
14. The Columbus Blue Jackets' seventh-round pick went to the Anaheim Ducks as the result of a trade on October 7, 2020, that sent a conditional seventh-round pick in 2022 or 2023 to Columbus in exchange for this pick.
15. The Philadelphia Flyers' seventh-round pick went to the Nashville Predators as the result of a trade on October 7, 2020, that sent a fifth-round pick in 2020 (135th overall) to Philadelphia in exchange for Montreal's seventh-round pick in 2020 (202nd overall) and this pick.
16. The Washington Capitals' seventh-round pick went to the San Jose Sharks as the result of a trade on June 22, 2019, that sent a fifth-round pick in 2019 to Washington in exchange for a seventh-round pick in 2019 and this pick.
17. The Colorado Avalanche's fifth-round pick went to the Washington Capitals as the result of a trade on October 7, 2020, that sent a seventh-round pick in 2021 to Pittsburgh in exchange for this pick.
  Pittsburgh previously acquired this pick as the result of a trade on October 7, 2020, that sent a fifth-round pick in 2020 (139th overall) to Colorado in exchange for a fifth-round pick in 2020 (149th overall) and this pick.
18. The St. Louis Blues' seventh-round pick went to the Florida Panthers as the result of a trade on October 7, 2020, that sent Toronto's fifth-round pick in 2020 (137th overall) to Toronto in exchange for Vegas' fifth-round pick in 2020 (153rd overall) and this pick.
  Toronto previously acquired this pick as the result of a trade on June 22, 2019, that sent a seventh-round pick in 2019 to St. Louis in exchange for this pick.
19. The Boston Bruins' seventh-round pick went to the Toronto Maple Leafs as the result of a trade on October 7, 2020, that sent a seventh-round pick in 2021 to Boston in exchange for this pick.
20. The Dallas Stars' seventh-round pick went to the Buffalo Sabres as the result of a trade on November 10, 2018, that sent Taylor Fedun to Dallas in exchange for this pick (being conditional at the time of the trade). The condition – Buffalo will receive a seventh-round pick in 2020 if Fedun plays in 25 games during the 2018–19 NHL season and 2019 Stanley Cup playoffs combined – was converted on January 17, 2019.

== Draftees based on nationality ==
Rank	Country	Selections	Percent	Top selection
	North America	123	56.9%	
1	Canada	73	33.8%	Alexis Lafreniere, 1st
2	United States	50	23.1%	Jake Sanderson, 5th
	Europe	93	43.1%	
3	Sweden	32	14.8%	Lucas Raymond, 4th
4	Russia	24	11.1%	Yaroslav Askarov, 11th
5	Finland	17	7.9%	Anton Lundell, 12th
6	Czech Republic	8	3.7%	Jan Mysak, 48th
7	Germany	3	1.4%	Tim Stutzle, 3rd
7	Austria	3	1.4%	Marco Rossi, 9th
9	Slovakia	2	0.9%	Samuel Knazko, 78th
9	Belarus	2	0.9%	Yevgeni Oksentyuk, 162nd
11	Norway	1	0.5%	Ole Julian Bjorgvik-Holm, 145th
11	Latvia	1	0.5%	Raivis Ansons, 149th

=== North American draftees by state/province ===
Rank	State/province	Selections	Percent	Top selection
1	Ontario	26	12.0%	Quinton Byfield, 2nd
2	Alberta	15	6.9%	Dylan Holloway, 14th
3	Quebec	12	5.6%	Alexis Lafreniere, 1st
4	Massachusetts	8	3.7%	Sam Colangelo, 36th
4	Minnesota	8	3.7%	Brock Faber, 45th
6	British Columbia	6	2.8%	Jack Finley, 57th
6	Michigan	6	2.8%	Antonio Stranges, 123rd
8	Wisconsin	5	2.3%	Mason Lohrei, 58th
9	Manitoba	4	1.9%	Seth Jarvis, 13th
9	New York	4	1.9%	Luke Tuch, 47th
11	Saskatchewan	3	1.4%	Braden Schneider, 19th
11	Texas	3	1.4%	Thomas Bordeleau, 38th
13	Nova Scotia	2	0.9%	Justin Barron, 25th
13	California	2	0.9%	Brendan Brisson, 29th
13	North Dakota	2	0.9%	Tyler Kleven, 44th
13	Ohio	2	0.9%	Mitchell Miller, 111th
13	Rhode Island	2	0.9%	Brett Berard, 134th
13	Illinois	2	0.9%	Luke Reid, 166th
19	Montana	1	0.5%	Jake Sanderson, 5th
19	Newfoundland and Labrador	1	0.5%	Dawson Mercer, 18th
19	New Brunswick	1	0.5%	Lukas Cormier, 68th
19	Colorado	1	0.5%	Ty Smilanic, 74th
19	Indiana	1	0.5%	Landon Slaggert, 79th
19	New Jersey	1	0.5%	Alex Laferriere, 83rd
19	Washington	1	0.5%	Lukas Svejkovsky, 108th
19	Connecticut	1	0.5%	Nick Capone, 157th
19	Idaho	1	0.5%	Bear Hughes, 158th
19	Iowa	1	0.5%	Noah Ellis, 184th
19	Missouri	1	0.5%	Chase Bradley, 203rd
19	Northwest Territories	1	0.5%	Ronan Seeley, 208th

== See also ==
- 2016–17 NHL transactions
- 2017–18 NHL transactions
- 2018–19 NHL transactions
- 2019–20 NHL transactions
- 2020–21 NHL transactions
- 2020–21 NHL season
- List of first overall NHL draft picks
- List of NHL players
