= List of Germans in the NHL =

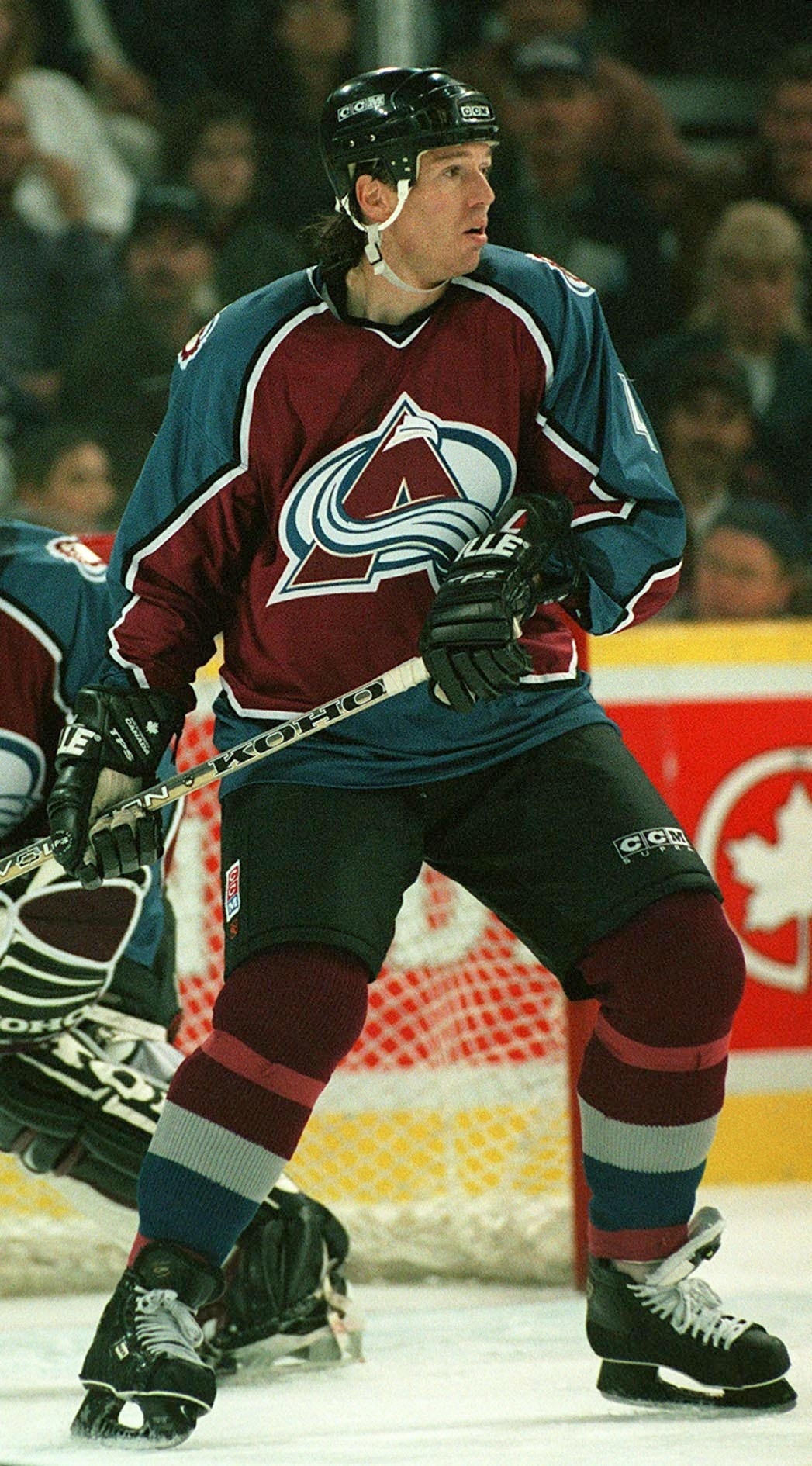
Uwe Krupp was the first German to have a significant NHL career and the first to win the Stanley Cup.

The following is a list of ice hockey players from Germany who have played or currently play in the National Hockey League (NHL).

As of February 2025, there were seven Germans playing in the NHL, or roughly 1% of players. Orest Romashyna was drafted by the Boston Bruins with the third overall pick in the 1963 NHL amateur draft, the joint-highest a German player has ever been drafted (sharing the honor with Leon Draisaitl and Tim Stützle). In the process, Romashyna became the first German ever drafted, but never played a game in the league. The first German to appear in a game was Udo Kießling, suiting up for the Minnesota North Stars. His first and only appearance came in a game on 13 March 1982.

The following year, Uwe Krupp was drafted by the Buffalo Sabres with the 124th overall pick. Krupp would become the first German to have a substantial NHL career, appearing in 729 games on the roster of Buffalo, the New York Islanders, Quebec Nordiques, Colorado Avalanche, Detroit Red Wings, and Atlanta Thrashers between the 1986–87 and the 2002–03 seasons. Krupp was also the first German to win the Stanley Cup, scoring the game-winning goal for the Avalanche in Game 4 of the 1996 Stanley Cup Final. The goal, coming in the third overtime period, clinched the win and the series sweep. Krupp won the championship one more time, the second with the Detroit Red Wings in 2002, to become the first German to win it twice. However, Krupp's name only appears on the cup once, as he only played eight games that season and did not appear in the finals. Another German was guaranteed the cup after Christian Ehrhoff of the Vancouver Canucks and Dennis Seidenberg's Boston Bruins met in the 2011 finals. Despite being the third German to win the Stanley Cup (after Krupp and Seidenberg), Tom Kühnhackl became the first player to take the trophy to Germany following his 2016 win with the Pittsburgh Penguins. Nico Sturm lifted the Cup with the Colorado Avalanche in 2022 and the Florida Panthers in 2025, joining Krupp and Kühnhackl as two-time winners.

Olaf Kölzig is perhaps the league's best goaltender from Germany. He became the first German to win a league award, taking home the Vezina Trophy as the league's best goaltender for the 1999–2000 season and later the King Clancy Memorial Trophy for his leadership qualities and humanitarian efforts in 2005–06. In total, Kölzig played in 719 NHL games (all but eight with the Washington Capitals) with an overall 303–297–87 record, a 2.71 GAA, a .906 sv%, and 35 shutouts during his career which spanned the 1990s and 2000s. Despite his accomplishments, Kölzig never won a Stanley Cup. Philipp Grubauer was the first German goaltender to win that honor when he was crowned champion with the Washington Capitals in 2018.

The 2010s saw a surge of German draft picks with a German player selected in every draft from 2014 to 2023. The 2018 and 2019 entry drafts marked the first time that a German player was taken in the first round in back-to-back years. The Ottawa Senators drafted Tim Stützle third overall in 2020 entry draft to extend the streak to three consecutive drafts. Lukas Reichel was also drafted in the first round that year, making 2020 the first-ever draft in which more than one German player was taken in the first round.

Leon Draisaitl was drafted third overall in 2014. With his debut, he became the 28th German to ever play in the NHL and quickly became the best German player in league history. He holds various records including: most goals in a season with 55, most assists with 76, and most points with 128. He is the first, and only German player so far, to have a 100+ point season and the first German player to win the Hart Trophy, Art Ross Trophy, and the Ted Lindsay Award and the first German to win more than one award in a single season. With a goal and assist against the Winnipeg Jets in April 2021, Draisaitl became the all-time top German points scorer, surpassing the previous record held by Marco Sturm who tallied 487 points in 938 games. In December 2025, Draisaitl became the first German player and the 103rd player ever to hit 1000 points.

== Players ==
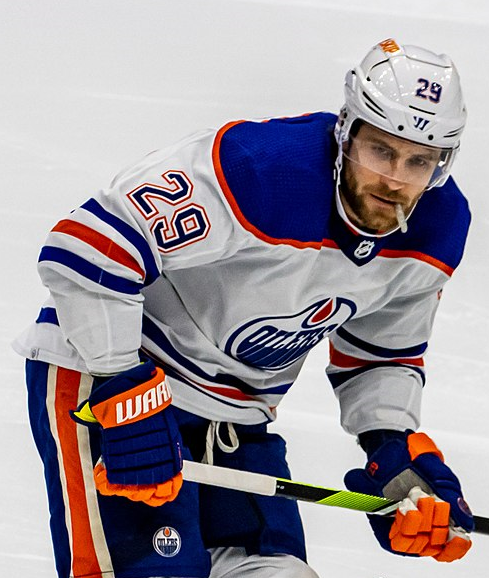
Leon Draisaitl, the NHL's all-time top scorer from Germany

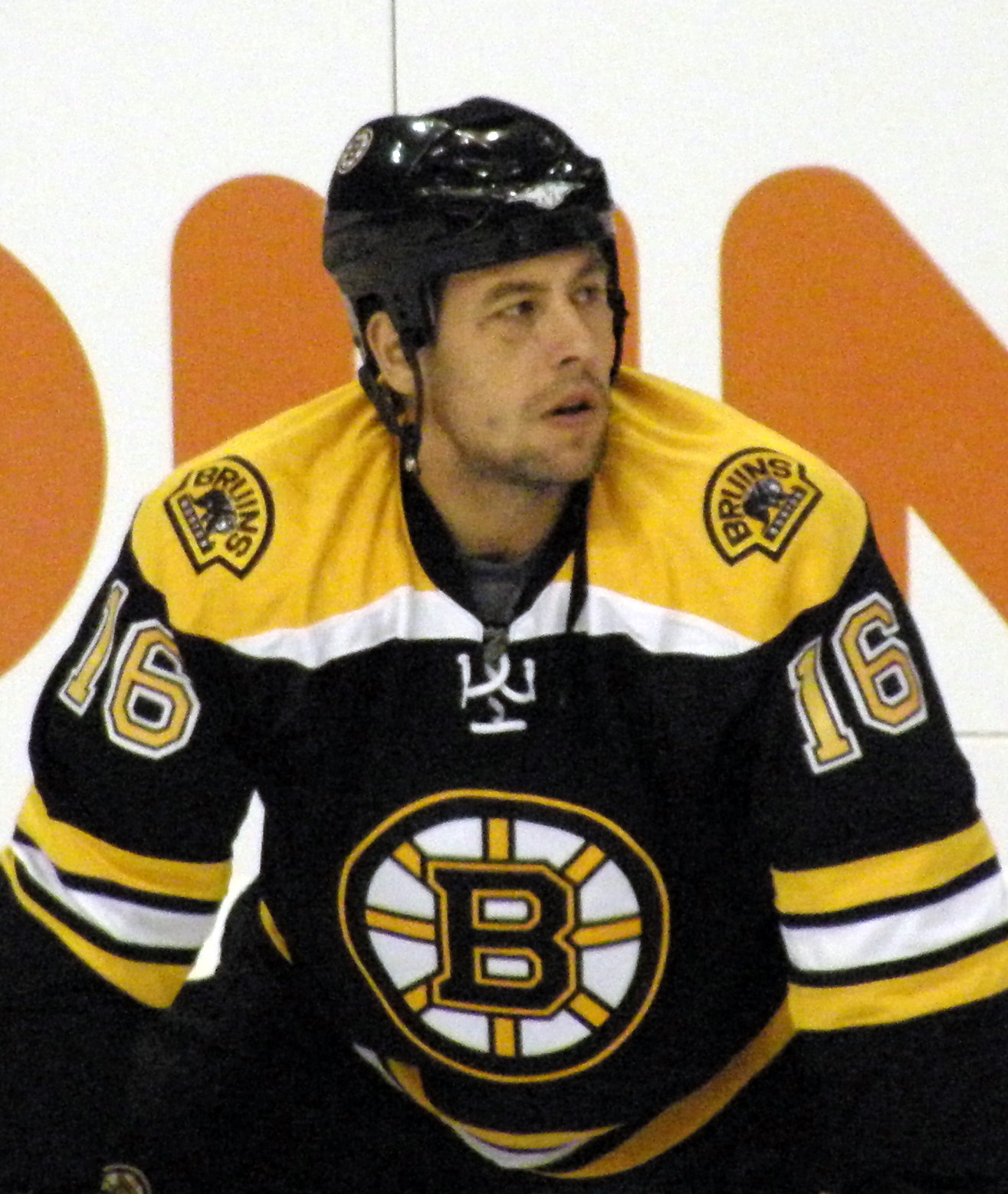
Before the emergence of Draisaitl, Marco Sturm was Germany's highest points scorer. In 2025, he became the first German head coach in league history.

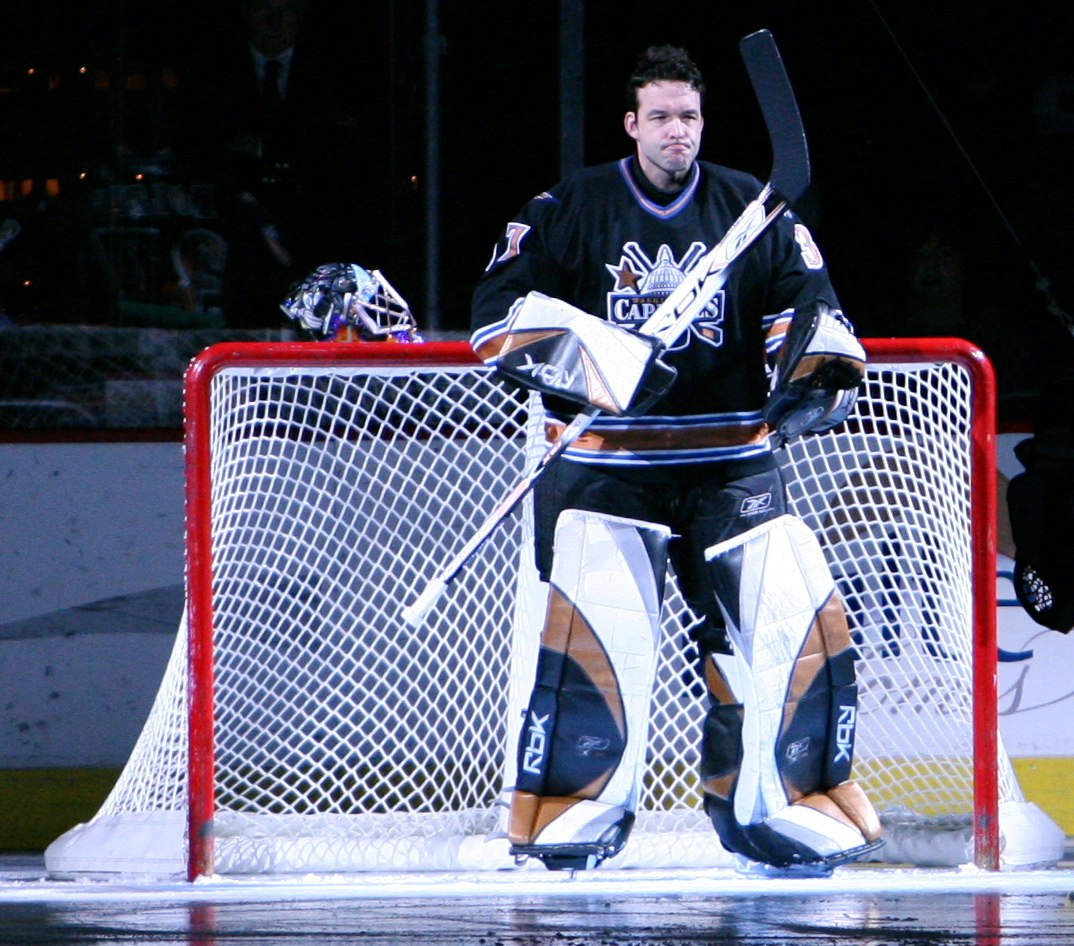
Olaf Kölzig, Germany's winningest NHL goaltender, with the Washington Capitals

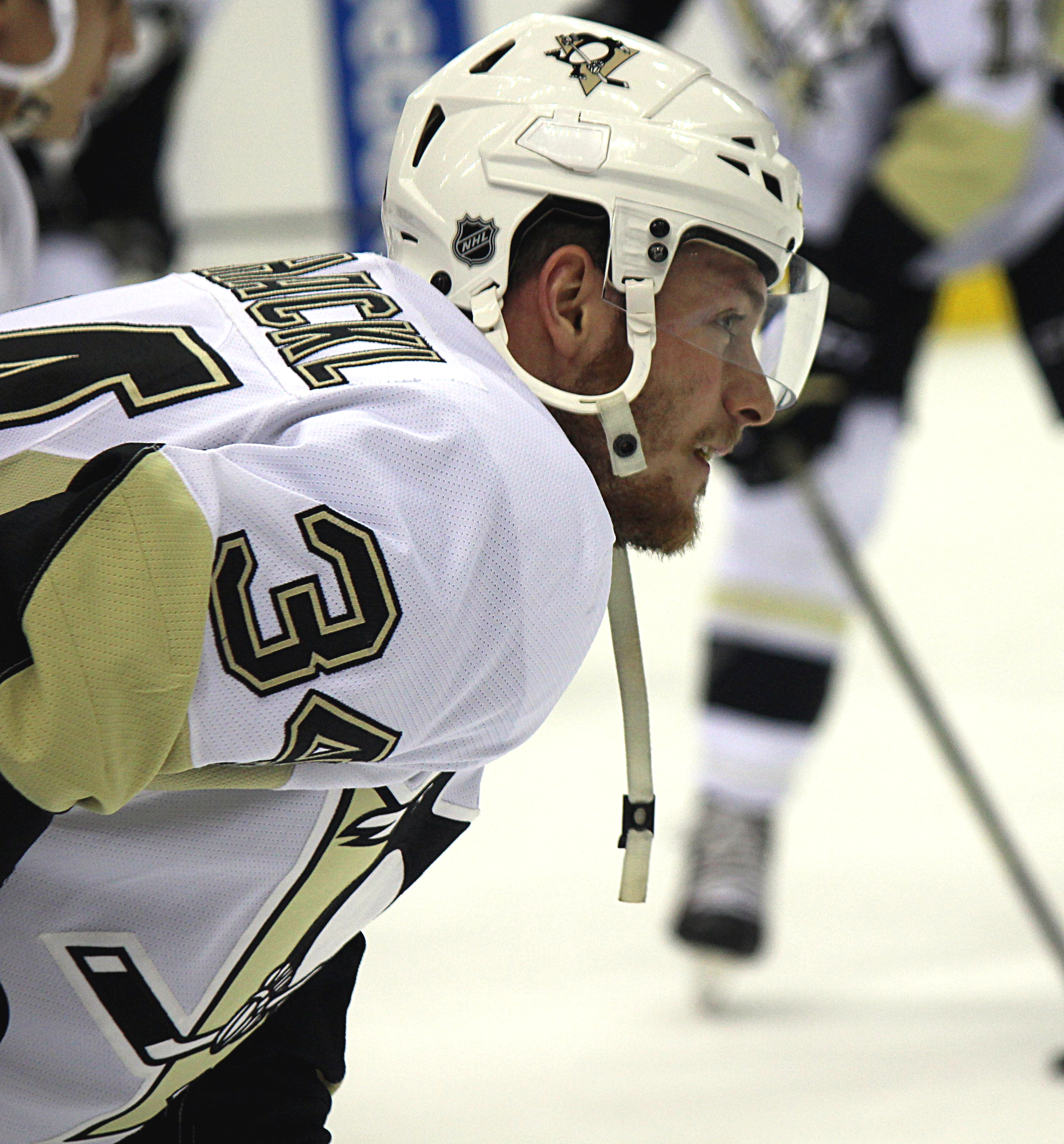
Tom Kühnhackl won two Stanley Cups with the Pittsburgh Penguins, becoming the first German to win multiple times with the same team.

Stats include regular season games and points only. Active players currently playing in the NHL are in bold.

=== All-time statistics ===
As of 17 April 2025

Rank	Name	First year	Final Year	GP	Goals	Assists	Points	Stanley Cups
1	**Leon Draisaitl**	2015		790	399	557	956	
2	Marco Sturm	1997	2012	938	242	245	487	
3	Jochen Hecht	1998	2013	833	186	277	463	
4	Christian Ehrhoff	2003	2016	789	74	265	339	
5	**Tim Stützle**	2020		366	114	209	323	
6	Uwe Krupp	1986	2003	729	69	212	281	1996, 2002
7	Dennis Seidenberg	2002	2018	859	44	207	251	2011
8	Marcel Goc	2004	2015	636	75	113	188	
9	**Moritz Seider**	2021		327	29	150	179	
10	**JJ Peterka**	2021		237	66	82	148	
11	Tobias Rieder	2014	2021	478	64	81	145	
12	Brian Glynn	1987	1994	431	25	79	104	
13	**Nico Sturm**	2018		331	46	46	92	2022, 2025
14	Dominik Kahun	2018	2021	186	34	49	83	
15	Uli Hiemer	1984	1987	143	19	54	73	
16	Christoph Schubert	2005	2010	315	25	47	72	
17	**Lukas Reichel**	2021		169	20	34	54	
18	Tom Kühnhackl	2015	2019	232	18	36	54	2016, 2017
19	Korbinian Holzer	2010	2020	206	6	21	27	
20	Alexander Sulzer	2008	2014	131	7	15	22	
21	Stefan Ustorf	1995	1997	54	7	10	7	
22	Olaf Kölzig	1989	2009	719	0	17	17	
23	Sven Butenschön	1997	2006	140	2	12	14	
24	Jason Holland	1996	2004	81	4	5	9	
25	John Tripp	2002	2004	43	2	7	9	
26	Ron Fischer	1981	1983	18	0	7	7	
27	**Philipp Grubauer**	2012		370	0	6	6	2018
28	Thomas Greiss	2007	2023	368	0	4	4	
29	Jan Benda	1997	1998	9	0	3	3	
30	Chris Schmidt	2002	2003	10	0	2	2	
31	Karl Friesen	1986	1987	4	0	1	1	
32	Mike Heidt	1983	1984	6	0	1	1	
33	Lean Bergmann	2019	2021	13	0	1	1	
34	Erich Goldmann	1999	2000	1	0	0	0	
35	Udo Kiessling	1982	1983	1	0	0	0	
36	Timo Pielmeier	2010	2011	1	0	0	0	
37	Maksymilian Szuber	2023	2024	1	0	0	0	
38	Niklas Treutle	2015	2016	2	0	0	0	
39	Michel Larocque	2000	2001	3	0	0	0	
40	Dimitri Pätzold	2007	2008	3	0	0	0	
41	Marcel Müller	2010	2011	3	0	0	0	
42	David Wolf	2014	2015	3	0	0	0	
43	Rob Zepp	2014	2015	10	0	0	0	
44	Marc Michaelis	2020	2021	15	0	0	0	
45	Sascha Goc	2000	2002	22	0	0	0	

=== Draftees ===
The following German players were selected in the NHL draft but never played in the league.

Name	Year	Position	Team
Orest Romashyna	1963	3rd	Boston Bruins
Bernhard Englbrecht	1978	196th	Atlanta Flames
Gerd Truntschka	1978	200th	St. Louis Blues
Daniel Held	1980	105th	Philadelphia Flyers
Dieter Hegen	1981	46th	Montreal Canadiens
Jayson Meyer	1983	94th	Buffalo Sabres
Greg Evtushevski	1983	125th	New Jersey Devils
Miroslav Maly	1984	76th	Minnesota North Stars
Peter Romberg	1985	206th	Calgary Flames
Milos Vanik	1987	225th	Washington Capitals
Andreas Lupzig	1988	239th	Chicago Blackhawks
Michael Pohl	1988	243rd	New Jersey Devils
Torsten Kienass	1991	260th	Boston Bruins
Marc Seliger	1993	251st	Washington Capitals
Frank Appel	1994	123rd	Calgary Flames
Kai Fischer	1996	160th	Colorado Avalanche
Robert Francz	1997	151st	Phoenix Coyotes
Robert Müller	2001	275th	Washington Capitals
Stefan Schauer	2001	162nd	Ottawa Senators
Alexander Sulzer	2003	92nd	Nashville Predators
Patrick Ehelechner	2003	139th	San Jose Sharks
Kai Hospelt	2003	216th	San Jose Sharks
Eduard Lewandowski	2003	242nd	Phoenix Coyotes
Darin Olver	2004	36th	New York Rangers
Philip Gogulla	2005	48th	Buffalo Sabres
Felix Schütz	2006	117th	Buffalo Sabres
Constantin Braun	2006	164th	Los Angeles Kings
Justin Krueger	2006	213th	Carolina Hurricanes
Sebastian Stefaniszin	2007	98th	Anaheim Ducks
Denis Reul	2007	130th	Boston Bruins
Robert Dietrich	2007	174th	Nashville Predators
Jerome Flaake	2008	130th	Toronto Maple Leafs
Dominik Bielke	2009	207th	San Jose Sharks
Mirko Höfflin	2010	151st	Chicago Blackhawks
Konrad Abeltshauser	2010	163rd	San Jose Sharks
David Elsner	2010	194th	Nashville Predators
Marcel Noebels	2011	118th	Philadelphia Flyers
Frederik Tiffels	2015	167th	Pittsburgh Penguins
Manuel Wiederer	2016	150th	San Jose Sharks
Leon Gawanke	2017	136th	Winnipeg Jets
Dominik Bokk	2018	25th	St. Louis Blues
Justin Schütz	2018	170th	Florida Panthers
Luca Münzenberger	2021	90th	Edmonton Oilers
Håkon Hänelt	2021	151st	Washington Capitals
Nikita Quapp	2021	187th	Carolina Hurricanes
Julian Lutz	2022	43rd	Arizona Coyotes
Kevin Bicker	2023	147th	Detroit Red Wings
Arno Tiefensee	2023	157th	Dallas Stars
Norwin Panocha	2023	205th	Buffalo Sabres
Maxim Schäfer	2025	96th	Washington Capitals
Julius Sumpf	2025	98th	Chicago Blackhawks
David Lewandowski	2025	117th	Edmonton Oilers
Carlos Händel	2025	177th	Montreal Canadiens
Tobias Krestan	2026	209th	Los Angeles Kings

=== Non-draftees ===
The following German players were not selected in the NHL draft, but signed NHL contracts. These players have not made an NHL appearance. This list may be incomplete.

Name	Team	Joined	Previous	Ref.
Josh Samanski	Edmonton Oilers	2 April 2025	(Germany) Straubing Tigers (DEL)	
Wojciech Stachowiak	Tampa Bay Lightning	22 May 2025	(Germany) ERC Ingolstadt (DEL)	

== Coaches ==
Marco Sturm became the first German-born and raised head coach of an NHL team when he was hired for the position by the Boston Bruins in summer 2025. Prior to being named Boston's head coach, Sturm spent four seasons as an assistant coach with the Los Angeles Kings beginning in 2018–19 and three seasons as head coach of its American Hockey League affiliate, the Ontario Reign. Prior to Sturm, Canadian-born and raised German international Ralph Krueger coached the Edmonton Oilers and Buffalo Sabres. In signing for Boston, Sturm became only the fourth European head coach in league history and the first European to hold the position for a club for which he previously played.

Coach	Team	Season	Regular season						Postseason			
Coach	Team	Season	G	W	L	OTL	Pts	Finish	W	L	Win %	Result
Marco Sturm	Boston Bruins	2025–26	0	0	0	0	0	TBD	0	0	–	TBD

== See also ==
- List of NHL players
- List of NHL statistical leaders by country
- Germany national ice hockey team
- List of Slovaks in the NHL
