= 2019 IIHF World U18 Championship Division I =

2019 IIHF U18 World Championship Division I
Tournament details
- Host countries: France; Hungary
- Dates: 14–20 April 2019
- Teams: 12

The 2019 IIHF U18 World Championship Division I was two international under-18 ice hockey tournaments organised by the International Ice Hockey Federation. The Division I A and Division I B tournaments represent the second and the third tier of the IIHF World U18 Championship.

== Division I A ==
2019 IIHF U18 World Championship Division I A

Tournament details
- Host country: France
- Venue(s): 1 (in 1 host city)
- Dates: 14–20 April
- Teams: 6

Tournament statistics
- Games played: 15
- Goals scored: 110 (7.33 per game)
- Attendance: 9,073 (605 per game)
- Scoring leader(s): (Kazakhstan) Dias Gusseinov (Germany) Nino Kinder (9 points)

Official website
- IIHF.com

The Division I A tournament was played in Grenoble, France, from 14 to 20 April 2019.

=== Participants ===
Team	Qualification
France	placed 10th in 2018 Top Division and were relegated
Germany	placed 2nd in 2018 Division I A
Denmark	placed 3rd in 2018 Division I A
Kazakhstan	placed 4th in 2018 Division I A
Norway	placed 5th in 2018 Division I A
Ukraine	placed 1st in 2018 Division I B and were promoted

=== Match officials ===
4 referees and 7 linesmen were selected for the tournament.

Referees

- (Poland) Michał Baca
- (Italy) Andrea Benvegnù
- (Switzerland) Alex DiPietro
- (Russia) Ivan Fateev

Linesmen

- (France) Joris Barcelo
- (Russia) Maksim Bersenev
- (United States) Nicholas Briganti
- (Switzerland) Daniel Duarte
- (Canada) Julien Fournier
- (Czech Republic) Jiří Svoboda
- (Belgium) Chris van Grinsven

=== Standings ===
Pos	Team	Pld	W	OTW	OTL	L	GF	GA	GD	Pts	Promotion or relegation
1	Germany	5	5	0	0	0	38	12	+26	15	Promoted to the 2021 Top Division
2	Kazakhstan	5	3	1	0	1	23	12	+11	11	
3	Denmark	5	3	0	1	1	17	14	+3	10	
4	Norway	5	2	0	0	3	13	17	−4	6	
5	France (H)	5	0	1	0	4	12	25	−13	2	
6	Ukraine	5	0	0	1	4	7	30	−23	1	Relegated to the 2022 Division I B

Source: IIHF
Rules for classification: 1) points; 2) head-to-head points; 3) head-to-head goal difference; 4) head-to-head number of goals scored; 5) result against closest best-ranked team outside tied teams; 6) result against second-best ranked team outside tied teams; 7) seeding before tournament.
(H) Host

=== Results ===
All times are local (UTC+2).

14 April 2019; 12:30	Norway	1–2 (0–1, 0–1, 1–0)	Denmark	Patinoire Polesud, Grenoble; Attendance: 502

Game reference

Tobias Breivold
Goalies
Frederik Nissen
Referee:
(Poland) Michał Baca
Linesmen:
(France) Joris Barcelo
(Russia) Maksim Bersenev

	0–1	03:08 – Almquist (Popovic)
Ellingsen – 51:35	1–1
	1–2	33:15 – Lehmann Hansen (SH2)

4 min
Penalties
10 min
30
Shots
16

14 April 2019; 16:00	Ukraine	1–2 OT (0–0, 0–1, 1–0); OT: (0–1)	France	Patinoire Polesud, Grenoble; Attendance: 1,114

Game reference

Dmytro Serdyuk
Goalies
Valentin Duquenne
Referee:
(Italy) Andrea Benvegnù
Linesmen:
(United States) Nicholas Briganti
(Czech Republic) Jiří Svoboda

	0–1	20:26 – Guer (Dubé, Baravaglio) (PP)
Panchenko (Ratushnyi, Tselohorodtsev) (PP) – 52:02	1–1
	1–2	61:20 – Tomasino (Allais, Dubé) (PP)

8 min
Penalties
6 min
21
Shots
24

14 April 2019; 19:30	Kazakhstan	2–5 (0–1, 0–2, 2–2)	Germany	Patinoire Polesud, Grenoble; Attendance: 274

Game reference

Vilen Prokofiev
Roman Kalmykov
Goalies
Tobias Ancicka
Referee:
(Switzerland) Alex DiPietro
Linesmen:
(Canada) Julien Fournier
(Belgium) Chris van Grinsven

	0–1	11:24 – Nijenhuis (Szuber, Kinder) (PP)
	0–2	23:50 – Lindner (Gnyp)
	0–3	29:08 – Heyer (Elias)
	0–4	44:13 – Kinder (Volek)
	0–5	46:34 – Nijenhuis (Szuber, Kinder) (PP2)
Gusseinov (Saiko, Filippenko) – 53:33	1–5
Saiko (Shaikhmeddenov, Alexandrov) – 53:45	2–5

33 min
Penalties
0 min
19
Shots
39

15 April 2019; 12:30	Denmark	6–2 (2–1, 4–1, 0–0)	Ukraine	Patinoire Polesud, Grenoble; Attendance: 275

Game reference

Frederik Nissen
Goalies
Dmytro Serdyuk
Nazarii Sushak
Referee:
(Russia) Ivan Fateev
Linesmen:
(France) Joris Barcelo
(Switzerland) Daniel Duarte

	0–1	04:24 – Matusevich (Serednytsky) (PP)
Jensen (Lehmann Hansen, Nielsen) – 07:24	1–1
Almquist (Brøndberg, Jensen) (PP) – 15:07	2–1
Diedrichsen (Galby) – 22:49	3–1
Popovic (Jensen, Nissen) (PP) – 24:20	4–1
Almquist (Popovic) – 33:19	5–1
	5–2	34:01 – Timchenko (Tselohorodtsev)
Lehmann Hansen (Rübenach) – 36:54	6–2

2 min
Penalties
4 min
35
Shots
19

15 April 2019; 16:00	Germany	6–4 (2–1, 1–3, 3–0)	Norway	Patinoire Polesud, Grenoble; Attendance: 628

Game reference

Tobias Ancicka
Goalies
Tobias Breivold
Referee:
(Italy) Andrea Benvegnù
Linesmen:
(Czech Republic) Jiří Svoboda
(Belgium) Chris van Grinsven

Varejcka (Gnyp, Alberg) – 10:53	1–0
	1–1	16:49 – Strandborg (Lam, Ellingsen)
Reichel (Alberg, Stützle) (PP) – 19:54	2–1
	2–2	28:51 – Ellingsen (EA)
	2–3	29:14 – Trygg (Frøberg, Spaberg Olsen)
Heyer (Peterka) – 34:29	3–3
	3–4	38:27 – Trygg (Spaberg Olsen)
Stützle (Nijenhuis) – 40:52	4–4
Glötzl (Peterka, Kuqi) – 49:08	5–4
Schumacher (Peterka) (EN) – 58:35	6–4

8 min
Penalties
8 min
35
Shots
29

15 April 2019; 19:30	France	2–7 (1–2, 0–3, 1–2)	Kazakhstan	Patinoire Polesud, Grenoble; Attendance: 668

Game reference

Valentin Duquenne
Tristan Mongellaz
Goalies
Roman Kalmykov
Referee:
(Poland) Michał Baca
Linesmen:
(United States) Nicholas Briganti
(Canada) Julien Fournier

	0–1	02:53 – Gusseinov (Musorov, Saiko)
	0–2	09:43 – Filippenko (Dikhanbek, Zalevski) (PP)
Dubé (Baravaglio) – 11:16	1–2
	1–3	23:39 – Saiko (Gusseinov, Shaikhmeddenov)
	1–4	29:14 – Dikhanbek (O. Boiko, Zalevski)
	1–5	33:32 – Saiko (Musorov)
	1–6	52:57 – Chaporov (Dikhanbek, Filippenko) (PP)
Gueurif (Tomasino) – 55:02	2–6
	2–7	56:28 – Zalevski (Gusseinov, Musorov) (PP)

6 min
Penalties
6 min
29
Shots
37

17 April 2019; 12:30	Ukraine	1–6 (0–1, 0–1, 1–4)	Kazakhstan	Patinoire Polesud, Grenoble; Attendance: 626

Game reference

Nazarii Sushak
Goalies
Roman Kalmykov
Referee:
(Russia) Ivan Fateev
Linesmen:
(France) Joris Barcelo
(Canada) Julien Fournier

	0–1	11:52 – Korolyov (Gusseinov)
	0–2	31:10 – Kassenov (Omirbekov)
	0–3	42:54 – Chaporov (O. Boiko, Dikhanbek) (PP)
	0–4	47:38 – Musorov (Korolyov, O. Boiko)
	0–5	49:56 – Butenko (Gusseinov) (SH)
Abadzhian (PP) – 51:09	1–5
	1–6	57:12 – Gusseinov (Zalevski, Omirbekov)

22 min
Penalties
2 min
18
Shots
43

17 April 2019; 16:00	Germany	5–2 (0–1, 3–1, 2–0)	Denmark	Patinoire Polesud, Grenoble; Attendance: 566

Game reference

Tobias Ancicka
Goalies
Frederik Nissen
Referee:
(Poland) Michał Baca
Linesmen:
(Russia) Maksim Bersenev
(Switzerland) Daniel Duarte

	0–1	00:21 – Almquist (Diedrichsen, Brinkman)
	0–2	29:13 – Lehmann Hansen (Jensen)
Varejcka (Stützle, Gnyp) (PP) – 32:57	1–2
Alberg (Schumacher, Stützle) (PP) – 36:11	2–2
Kinder (Reichel, Volek) – 37:41	3–2
Nijenhuis (Peterka, Lindner) – 56:22	4–2
Stützle (Schumacher, Nijenhuis) (EN) – 59:06	5–2

6 min
Penalties
20 min
35
Shots
21

17 April 2019; 19:30	France	2–3 (0–0, 2–3, 0–0)	Norway	Patinoire Polesud, Grenoble; Attendance: 968

Game reference

Valentin Duquenne
Goalies
Tobias Normann
Referee:
(Switzerland) Alex DiPietro
Linesmen:
(United States) Nicholas Briganti
(Czech Republic) Jiří Svoboda

	0–1	26:29 – Spaberg Olsen (Engebråten) (PP)
Dubé (Dair) (PP) – 30:16	1–1
	1–2	31:03 – Spaberg Olsen (Lilleberg, Frøberg)
	1–3	33:21 – Spaberg Olsen (Engebråten, Normann) (PP)
Quattrone – 33:38	2–3

14 min
Penalties
16 min
20
Shots
32

18 April 2019; 12:30	Germany	13–1 (6–0, 5–0, 2–1)	Ukraine	Patinoire Polesud, Grenoble; Attendance: 564

Game reference

Tobias Ancicka
Goalies
Dmytro Serdyuk
Nazarii Sushak
Referee:
(Switzerland) Alex DiPietro
Linesmen:
(France) Joris Barcelo
(Russia) Maksim Bersenev

Alberg (Varejcka, Elias) – 04:58	1–0
Nijenhuis (Schumacher, Stützle) – 06:52	2–0
Varejcka (Peterka, Gnyp) (PP) – 10:14	3–0
Volek (Kinder) – 11:43	4–0
Varejcka (Flade) – 12:14	5–0
Varejcka (Reichel, Stützle) (PP) – 14:14	6–0
Peterka (Lindner, Gnyp) – 22:13	7–0
Lindner (Kuqi) – 23:12	8–0
Varejcka – 26:39	9–0
Alberg (Elias, Schumacher) – 30:52	10–0
Heyer (Lindner, Kuqi) – 32:37	11–0
Reichel (Stützle) (PP) – 52:56	12–0
	12–1	57:24 – Poperezhai (Serednytsky)
Kuqi – 57:57	13–1

12 min
Penalties
33 min
46
Shots
17

18 April 2019; 16:00	Kazakhstan	5–2 (0–0, 3–1, 2–1)	Norway	Patinoire Polesud, Grenoble; Attendance: 535

Game reference

Roman Kalmykov
Goalies
Tobias Normann
Tobias Breivold
Referee:
(Italy) Andrea Benvegnù
Linesmen:
(Switzerland) Daniel Duarte
(Belgium) Chris van Grinsven

	0–1	26:53 – Hansen (Løkkeberg)
O. Boiko (Filippenko) – 28:59	1–1
Alexandrov (Kassenov) – 31:28	2–1
Chaporov – 34:12	3–1
Musorov (Saiko, Gusseinov) – 42:44	4–1
Alexandrov (Gusseinov) – 44:31	5–1
	5–2	51:30 – Hansen (Granath, Hafstad Johansen)

14 min
Penalties
14 min
31
Shots
29

18 April 2019; 19:30	Denmark	5–3 (1–0, 2–1, 2–2)	France	Patinoire Polesud, Grenoble; Attendance: 792

Game reference

Frederik Nissen
Goalies
Tristan Mongellaz
Referee:
(Russia) Ivan Fateev
Linesmen:
(United States) Nicholas Briganti
(Canada) Julien Fournier

Almquist (Lehmann Hansen) – 07:54	1–0
Jensen (Holzmann) – 21:43	2–0
Jensen (Brøndberg, Borring Hansen) (PP) – 35:45	3–0
	3–1	39:00 – Mainot (Léo, Tarabusi)
	3–2	53:23 – Proux (Allais, Dubé) (PP)
Almquist (Torbensen) – 56:20	4–2
	4–3	58:48 – Tarabusi (Allais)
Jensen (Popovic, Torbensen) (EN) – 59:20	5–3

8 min
Penalties
8 min
28
Shots
38

20 April 2019; 12:30	Norway	3–2 (1–0, 2–1, 2–2)	Ukraine	Patinoire Polesud, Grenoble; Attendance: 502

Game reference

Tobias Breivold
Goalies
Nazarii Sushak
Referee:
(Poland) Michał Baca
Linesmen:
(France) Joris Barcelo
(Belgium) Chris van Grinsven

Frøberg (Granath) (PP) – 09:47	1–0
	1–1	27:51 – Tymchenko (Bolotin, Matusevich)
Granath (Spaberg Olsen, Brenne Halvorsen) (PP) – 38:55	2–1
	2–2	41:34 – Serednytsky (Bolotin, Matusevich) (PP2)
Brenne Halvorsen (Lilleberg, Løkkeberg) – 59:53	3–2

16 min
Penalties
8 min
35
Shots
20

20 April 2019; 16:00	Denmark	2–3 GWS (1–1, 1–0, 0–1); OT: (0–0); SO: (0–1)	Kazakhstan	Patinoire Polesud, Grenoble; Attendance: 191

Game reference

Frederik Nissen
Goalies
Roman Kalmykov
Referee:
(Switzerland) Alex DiPietro
Linesmen:
(Russia) Maksim Bersenev
(Switzerland) Daniel Duarte

Torbensen (Brøngberg, Borring Hansen) – 09:22	1–0
	1–1	11:59 – Chaporov (Filippenko, Dikhanbek)
Galby (Schleicher, Dreier) – 29:16	2–1
	2–2	45:43 – Musorov

Jensen (miss)
Almquist (miss)
Dreier (miss)
Borring Hansen (miss)
Shootout
(miss) Musorov
Filippenko
Alexandrov
14 min
Penalties
6 min
17
Shots
33

20 April 2019; 19:30	France	3–9 (1–3, 0–3, 2–3)	Germany	Patinoire Polesud, Grenoble; Attendance: 868

Game reference

Valentin Duquenne
Tristan Mongellaz
Goalies
Arno Tiefensee
Referee:
(Italy) Andrea Benvegnù
Linesmen:
(United States) Nicholas Briganti
(Czech Republic) Jiří Svoboda

Tomasino (Dubé) – 01:49	1–0
	1–1	11:33 – Kinder (Volek, Gnyp)
	1–2	14:45 – Gnyp (Kinder)
	1–3	15:03 – Reichel (Kinder, Szuber)
	1–4	29:55 – Lindner (Kinder, Szuber) (PP)
	1–5	36:11 – Borzecki (Peterka, Lindner)
	1–6	37:11 – Schumacher (Stützle, Gnyp)
Dubé (Proux) – 50:31	2–6
Mainot (Guer, Baravaglio) – 56:23	3–6
	3–7	59:31 – Alberg (Varejcka, Elias)
	3–8	59:40 – Peterka (Flade)
	3–9	59:52 – Kuqi (Szuber)

6 min
Penalties
4 min
28
Shots
53

=== Statistics ===
==== Scoring leaders ====
List shows the top ten skaters sorted by points, then goals.

Player	GP	G	A	Pts	+/−	PIM	POS
(Kazakhstan) Dias Guseinov	5	3	6	9	+10	2	F
(Germany) Nino Kinder	5	3	6	9	+3	0	F
(Germany) Tim Stützle	5	2	7	9	+2	12	F
(Germany) Filip Varejcka	5	6	2	8	+2	0	F
(Germany) John-Jason Peterka	5	2	6	8	+8	0	F
(Germany) Simon Gnyp	5	1	7	8	+10	2	D
(Denmark) Mikkel Jensen	5	4	3	7	0	2	F
(France) Pierrick Dubé	5	3	4	7	–1	0	F
(Germany) Elias Lindner	5	3	4	7	+7	6	F
(Denmark) Marcus Almquist	5	6	0	6	0	4	F

GP = Games played; G = Goals; A = Assists; Pts = Points; +/− = P Plus–minus; PIM = Penalties in minutes; POS = Position
Source: IIHF

==== Leading goaltenders ====
Only the top five goaltenders, based on save percentage, who have played 40% of their team's minutes are included in this list.

Player	TOI	SA	GA	GAA	Sv%	SO
(Kazakhstan) Roman Kalmykov	258:26	98	7	1.63	92.86	0
(Denmark) Frederik Nissen	303:57	153	12	2.37	92.16	0
(Germany) Tobias Ancicka	240:00	86	9	2.25	89.53	0
(Norway) Tobias Breivold	192:48	77	9	2.80	88.31	0
(France) Valentin Duquenne	194:24	113	15	4.63	86.73	0

TOI = Time On Ice (minutes:seconds); SA = Shots against; GA = Goals against; GAA = Goals against average; Sv% = Save percentage; SO = Shutouts
Source: IIHF

=== Awards ===
Best Players Selected by the Directorate

- Goaltender: (Denmark) Frederik Nissen
- Defenceman: (Kazakhstan) Madi Dikhanbek
- Forward: (Germany) Tim Stützle

Source: IIHF

== Division I B ==
2019 IIHF U18 World Championship Division I B

Tournament details
- Host country: Hungary
- Venue(s): 1 (in 1 host city)
- Dates: 14–20 April
- Teams: 6

Tournament statistics
- Games played: 13
- Goals scored: 87 (6.69 per game)
- Attendance: 7,395 (569 per game)
- Scoring leader(s): (Hungary) Márk Schlekmann (9 points)

Official website
- IIHF.com

The Division I B tournament was played in Székesfehérvár, Hungary, from 14 to 20 April 2019.

=== Participants ===
Team	Qualification
Slovenia	placed 6th in 2018 Division I A and were relegated
Austria	placed 2nd in 2018 Division I B
Japan	placed 3rd in 2018 Division I B
Hungary	placed 4th in 2018 Division I B
Italy	placed 5th in 2018 Division I B
Great Britain	placed 1st in 2018 Division II A and were promoted

=== Match officials ===
4 referees and 7 linesmen were selected for the tournament.

Referees

- (Denmark) Martin Christensen
- (France) Adrien Ernecq
- (Australia) Grainge Phillips
- (Croatia) Trpimir Piragić

Linesmen

- (Croatia) Tomislav Grozaj
- (Slovakia) Lukáš Kacej
- (Sweden) Johan Löfgren
- (Hungary) Attila Nagy
- (Ukraine) Anton Peretyatko
- (Lithuania) Laurynas Stepankevičius
- (Hungary) Dávid Váczi

=== Standings ===
Pos	Team	Pld	W	OTW	OTL	L	GF	GA	GD	Pts	Promotion or relegation
1	Japan	5	4	0	0	1	18	12	+6	12	Promoted to the 2022 Division I A
2	Austria	5	3	1	0	1	22	7	+15	11	
3	Hungary (H)	5	2	0	1	2	18	16	+2	7	
4	Italy	5	2	0	0	3	10	18	−8	6	
5	Slovenia	5	1	1	0	3	6	16	−10	5	
6	Great Britain	5	1	0	1	3	13	18	−5	4	Relegated to the 2022 Division II A

Source: IIHF
Rules for classification: 1) points; 2) head-to-head points; 3) head-to-head goal difference; 4) head-to-head number of goals scored; 5) result against closest best-ranked team outside tied teams; 6) result against second-best ranked team outside tied teams; 7) seeding before tournament.
(H) Host

=== Results ===
All times are local (UTC+2).

14 April 2019; 12:30	Italy	2–3 (0–0, 0–2, 2–1)	Japan	Ifjabb Ocskay Gábor Ice Hall, Székesfehérvár; Attendance: 75

Game reference

Davide Fadani
Goalies
Eiki Sato
Referee:
(Denmark) Martin Christensen
Linesmen:
(Slovakia) Lukáš Kacej
(Hungary) Attila Nagy

	0–1	23:31 – Okubo (Nakajima) (SH)
	0–2	27:03 – Miura (Hanzawa, Nakajima) (PP)
	0–3	42:11 – Miura (Nakajima, Hanzawa) (PP)
Payra (Covi) (PP) – 54:01	1–3
Cristellon (Covi) (SH) – 55:03	2–3

22 min
Penalties
10 min
31
Shots
34

14 April 2019; 16:00	Great Britain	2–3 (0–1, 1–0, 1–2)	Slovenia	Ifjabb Ocskay Gábor Ice Hall, Székesfehérvár; Attendance: 218

Game reference

William Kerlin
Goalies
Val Usnik
Referee:
(Australia) Grainge Phillips
Linesmen:
(Croatia) Tomislav Grozaj
(Hungary) Dávid Váczi

	0–1	10:26 – Krmelj (Markun, Mašič) (PP)
Graham (Brown, Hehir) – 28:55	1–1
	1–2	48:10 – Krmelj (Markun)
Bradley (Hazeldine, Graham) (PP) – 53:10	2–2
	2–3	57:59 – Vodlan (Sojer)

24 min
Penalties
22 min
30
Shots
17

14 April 2019; 19:30	Hungary	1–3 (0–1, 0–1, 1–1)	Austria	Ifjabb Ocskay Gábor Ice Hall, Székesfehérvár; Attendance: 1,350

Game reference

Dominik Horváth
Goalies
Felix Beck
Referee:
(Croatia) Trpimir Piragić
Linesmen:
(Sweden) Johan Löfgren
(Lithuania) Laurynas Stepankevičius

	0–1	07:07 – Lindner (Kandemir) (PP)
	0–2	33:35 – Harnisch (Nickl) (EA)
	0–3	48:25 – Nickl (Hochegger) (PP)
Falus (Schlekmann, Sárdi) – 49:02	1–3

32 min
Penalties
12 min
20
Shots
32

15 April 2019; 12:30	Japan	5–3 (2–0, 2–1, 1–2)	Great Britain	Ifjabb Ocskay Gábor Ice Hall, Székesfehérvár; Attendance: 78

Game reference

Toshiki Nakamura
Goalies
William Kerlin
Referee:
(France) Adrien Ernecq
Linesmen:
(Hungary) Attila Nagy
(Ukraine) Anton Peretyatko

Nakajima (Hanzawa, Suzuki) (PP2) – 10:03	1–0
Takeya (N. Sato, Ando) (PP2) – 18:07	2–0
	2–1	24:01 – Alderson (Hazeldine) (SH)
Ando (Ueno, Takeya) (PP) – 30:47	3–1
Ando (Miyata, N. Sato) (PP) – 39:59	4–1
	4–2	46:39 – Talbot (Bowering, Brown) (PP2)
	4–3	48:26 – Graham (Alderson)
Miyata (Suzuki) (EN) – 59:20	5–3

24 min
Penalties
36 min
40
Shots
20

15 April 2019; 16:00	Austria	7–0 (2–0, 3–0, 2–0)	Italy	Ifjabb Ocskay Gábor Ice Hall, Székesfehérvár; Attendance: 124

Game reference

Felix Beck
Goalies
Davide Fadani
Rudy Rigoni
Referee:
(Croatia) Trpimir Piragić
Linesmen:
(Sweden) Johan Löfgren
(Hungary) Dávid Váczi

Zündel (Harnisch, Maier) (PP) – 00:39	1–0
Pfeffer (Nickl, Frühwirt) – 11:19	2–0
Wimmer (Zündel) – 21:34	3–0
Hochegger (Nickl, Harnisch) (PP2) – 25:00	4–0
Ofner (Krainz, Pallierer) – 39:51	5–0
Pauschenwein (Hochegger, Urbanek) – 59:01	6–0
Moser (Ofner, Nickl) – 59:55	7–0

22 min
Penalties
22 min
39
Shots
29

15 April 2019; 19:30	Slovenia	2–1 GWS (0–1, 0–0, 1–2); OT: (0–0); SO: (1–0)	Hungary	Ifjabb Ocskay Gábor Ice Hall, Székesfehérvár; Attendance: 815

Game reference
Val Usnik	Goalies	Dominik Horváth	Referee: (Denmark) Martin Christensen; Linesmen: (Croatia) Tomislav Grozaj (Slovakia) Lukáš Kacej
/ 0–1 / 12:08 – Keresztes (Schlekmann); Povše – 55:26 / 1–1			Referee: (Denmark) Martin Christensen; Linesmen: (Croatia) Tomislav Grozaj (Slovakia) Lukáš Kacej
Markun (miss); Török (miss); Primožič (miss); Mašič (miss); Vodlan (miss); Krmelj	Shootout	(miss) M. Horváth; (miss) Keresztes; (miss) Schlekmann; (miss) Varga; (miss) Dobmayer; (miss) Schlekmann	Referee: (Denmark) Martin Christensen; Linesmen: (Croatia) Tomislav Grozaj (Slovakia) Lukáš Kacej
12 min	Penalties	20 min	Referee: (Denmark) Martin Christensen; Linesmen: (Croatia) Tomislav Grozaj (Slovakia) Lukáš Kacej
25	Shots	26	Referee: (Denmark) Martin Christensen; Linesmen: (Croatia) Tomislav Grozaj (Slovakia) Lukáš Kacej

17 April 2019; 12:30	Slovenia	0–2 (0–0, 0–0, 0–2)	Italy	Ifjabb Ocskay Gábor Ice Hall, Székesfehérvár; Attendance: 55

Game reference
Val Usnik	Goalies	Davide Fadani	Referee: (Croatia) Trpimir Piragić; Linesmen: (Sweden) Johan Löfgren (Hungary) Dávid Váczi
0–1 / 54:38 – Cristellon (Niccolai); 0–2 / 59:59 – Sölva (EN)			Referee: (Croatia) Trpimir Piragić; Linesmen: (Sweden) Johan Löfgren (Hungary) Dávid Váczi
8 min	Penalties	6 min	Referee: (Croatia) Trpimir Piragić; Linesmen: (Sweden) Johan Löfgren (Hungary) Dávid Váczi
24	Shots	27	Referee: (Croatia) Trpimir Piragić; Linesmen: (Sweden) Johan Löfgren (Hungary) Dávid Váczi

17 April 2019; 16:00	Austria	2–3 (1–0, 1–0, 0–3)	Japan	Ifjabb Ocskay Gábor Ice Hall, Székesfehérvár; Attendance: 200

Game reference

Felix Beck
Goalies
Eiki Sato
Referee:
(Australia) Grainge Phillips
Linesmen:
(Croatia) Tomislav Grozaj
(Lithuania) Laurynas Stepankevičius

Harnisch (Nickl, Hochegger) (PP) – 16:44	1–0
Kandemir (Thaler, Wallner) – 21:33	2–0
	2–1	43:39 – Ando (Miyata)
	2–2	49:37 – Ueno (N. Sato, Takeya) (PP)
	2–3	55:22 – Hanzawa

26 min
Penalties
2 min
21
Shots
30

17 April 2019; 19:30	Great Britain	5–4 (2–1, 2–1, 1–2)	Hungary	Ifjabb Ocskay Gábor Ice Hall, Székesfehérvár; Attendance: 1,385

Game reference

Lucas Brine
Goalies
Dominik Horváth
Referee:
(France) Adrien Ernecq
Linesmen:
(Slovakia) Lukáš Kacej
(Ukraine) Anton Peretyatko

Talbot (Griffin) (PP) – 04:48	1–0
	1–1	11:16 – Varga (Sárdi, M. Horváth) (PP)
Brown (Graham) (SH) – 17:18	2–1
Brown (Hazeldine, Bradley) (PP) – 24:35	3–1
Bowering (Larkin) (PP) – 25:17	4–1
	4–2	36:32 – Szűcs (Falus)
	4–3	45:59 – Ambrus (Schlekmann, Keresztes) (PP)
	4–4	49:52 – Schlekmann (Ambrus, Keresztes) (PP)
Brown (Graham, Alderson) – 58:08	5–4

18 min
Penalties
34 min
20
Shots
30

19 April 2019; 12:30	Austria	3–2 OT (0–1, 0–0, 2–1); OT: (1–0)	Great Britain	Ifjabb Ocskay Gábor Ice Hall, Székesfehérvár; Attendance: 150

Game reference

Felix Beck
Goalies
William Kerlin
Referee:
(Denmark) Martin Christensen
Linesmen:
(Sweden) Johan Löfgren
(Hungary) Attila Nagy

	0–1	10:48 – Alderson (Brown, Bowering)
Lindner (Maier, Kandemir) – 55:14	1–1
Harnisch (Nickl, Kandemir) – 56:09	2–1
	2–2	58:36 – Alderson (Chabot, Graham) (EA)
Hochegger (Nickl, Thaler) (PP) – 62:01	3–2

12 min
Penalties
39 min
36
Shots
20

19 April 2019; 16:00	Hungary	7–3 (1–0, 4–2, 2–1)	Italy	Ifjabb Ocskay Gábor Ice Hall, Székesfehérvár; Attendance: 1,215

Game reference

Dominik Horváth
Goalies
Davide Fadani
Referee:
(Australia) Grainge Phillips
Linesmen:
(Slovakia) Lukáš Kacej
(Ukraine) Anton Peretyatko

Mesterházy (Béres) – 04:26	1–0
	1–1	23:33 – Öhler (Stablum)
Rózsahegyi (Lövei, Csollák) – 24:20	2–1
Keresztes (Schlekmann, Sárdi) – 26:13	3–1
Keresztes (Schlekmann, M. Horváth) (PP) – 30:19	4–1
Szűcs (Varga) – 36:19	5–1
	5–2	36:30 – Gellon
Szűcs (Rózsahegyi) – 52:49	6–2
Sárdi (Schlekmann) (PP2) – 58:17	7–2
	7–3	59:45 – Brunner (Deluca)

16 min
Penalties
32 min
47
Shots
26

19 April 2019; 19:30	Japan	4–0 (1–0, 0–0, 3–0)	Slovenia	Ifjabb Ocskay Gábor Ice Hall, Székesfehérvár; Attendance: 165

Game reference

Eiki Sato
Goalies
Val Usnik
Referee:
(France) Adrien Ernecq
Linesmen:
(Croatia) Tomislav Grozaj
(Lithuania) Laurynas Stepankevičius

Ueno (Miyata, Takeya) (PP) – 08:49	1–0
Ueno – 46:20	2–0
Okubo (Ueno) – 56:50	3–0
Hanzawa (Ando) (PP) – 59:46	4–0

8 min
Penalties
12 min
25
Shots
20

20 April 2019; 12:30	Italy	3–1 (1–1, 1–0, 1–0)	Great Britain	Ifjabb Ocskay Gábor Ice Hall, Székesfehérvár; Attendance: 145

Game reference

Davide Fadani
Goalies
Lucas Brine
Referee:
(France) Adrien Ernecq
Linesmen:
(Hungary) Attila Nagy
(Hungary) Dávid Váczi

Panciera (Covi) – 00:44	1–0
	1–1	15:12 – Brown (Bowering, Graham) (PP2)
Rosa – 36:29	2–1
Selva (Payra) (PP) – 54:01	3–1

12 min
Penalties
35 min
22
Shots
26

20 April 2019; 16:00	Slovenia	1–7 (0–1, 1–4, 0–2)	Austria	Ifjabb Ocskay Gábor Ice Hall, Székesfehérvár; Attendance: 170

Game reference

Val Usnik
Gašper Panjtar
Goalies
Sebastian Wraneschitz
Referee:
(Croatia) Trpimir Piragić
Linesmen:
(Slovakia) Lukáš Kacej
(Sweden) Johan Löfgren

	0–1	18:42 – Kandemir (Krainz)
	0–2	20:51 – Hochegger (Maier, Nickl)
	0–3	24:01 – Ofner (Frühwirt)
Širovnik (Krmelj, Mašič) (PP) – 29:09	1–3
	1–4	30:22 – Pfeffer (Pallierer, Harnisch)
	1–5	33:33 – Maier (Wallner, Wimmer) (PP)
	1–6	49:46 – Wallner
	1–7	58:03 – Wallner (Thaler, Maier) (PP)

10 min
Penalties
12 min
17
Shots
38

20 April 2019; 19:30	Japan	3–5 (1–0, 1–3, 1–2)	Hungary	Ifjabb Ocskay Gábor Ice Hall, Székesfehérvár; Attendance: 1,250

Game reference

Toshiki Nakamura
Goalies
Dominik Horváth
Referee:
(Denmark) Martin Christensen
Linesmen:
(Ukraine) Anton Peretyatko
(Lithuania) Laurynas Stepankevičius

N. Sato (Ando, Miyata) (PP) – 11:14	1–0
	1–1	20:38 – M. Horváth (Schlekmann)
	1–2	23:48 – Rétfalvi (Dobmayer, M. Horváth) (PP)
Miyata – 25:23	2–2
	2–3	39:32 – Schlekmann (M. Horváth, Keresztes)
Maruyama (Takeya) – 47:59	3–3
	3–4	52:51 – Szűcs (Varga)
	3–5	59:26 – Varga (D. Horváth) (EN)

18 min
Penalties
24 min
38
Shots
26

=== Statistics ===
==== Scoring leaders ====
List shows the top ten skaters sorted by points, then goals.

Player	GP	G	A	Pts	+/−	PIM	POS
(Hungary) Márk Schlekmann	5	2	7	9	+3	0	F
(Austria) Thimo Nickl	5	1	8	9	+5	20	D
(United Kingdom) Kieran Brown	5	4	3	7	+3	12	F
(United Kingdom) Alex Graham	5	2	5	7	+3	6	F
(Japan) Yusaku Ando	5	3	3	6	+1	0	F
(Austria) Tim Harnisch	5	3	3	6	+2	6	F
(Austria) Fabian Hochegger	5	3	3	6	+4	4	F
(Hungary) Levente Keresztes	5	3	3	6	+3	12	F
(Japan) Daisuke Miyata	5	2	4	6	+2	0	F
(United Kingdom) Mason Alderson	5	3	2	5	+1	43	F
(Japan) Teppei Ueno	5	3	2	5	+4	2	F

GP = Games played; G = Goals; A = Assists; Pts = Points; +/− = P Plus–minus; PIM = Penalties in minutes; POS = Position
Source: IIHF

==== Leading goaltenders ====
Only the top five goaltenders, based on save percentage, who have played 40% of their team's minutes are included in this list.

Player	TOI	SA	GA	GAA	Sv%	SO
(Japan) Eiki Sato	180:00	72	4	1.33	94.44	1
(Austria) Felix Beck	241:31	99	6	1.49	93.94	1
(Slovenia) Val Usnik	277:04	133	13	2.82	90.23	0
(Italy) Davide Fadani	280:00	161	16	3.43	90.06	1
(Hungary) Dominik Horváth	303:30	140	15	2.97	89.29	0

TOI = Time On Ice (minutes:seconds); SA = Shots against; GA = Goals against; GAA = Goals against average; Sv% = Save percentage; SO = Shutouts
Source: IIHF

=== Awards ===
Best Players Selected by the Directorate

- Goaltender: (Japan) Eiki Sato
- Defenceman: (Austria) Thimo Nickl
- Forward: (Japan) Chikara Hanzawa

Source: IIHF
