= Michael Kesselring =

American ice hockey player (born 2000)

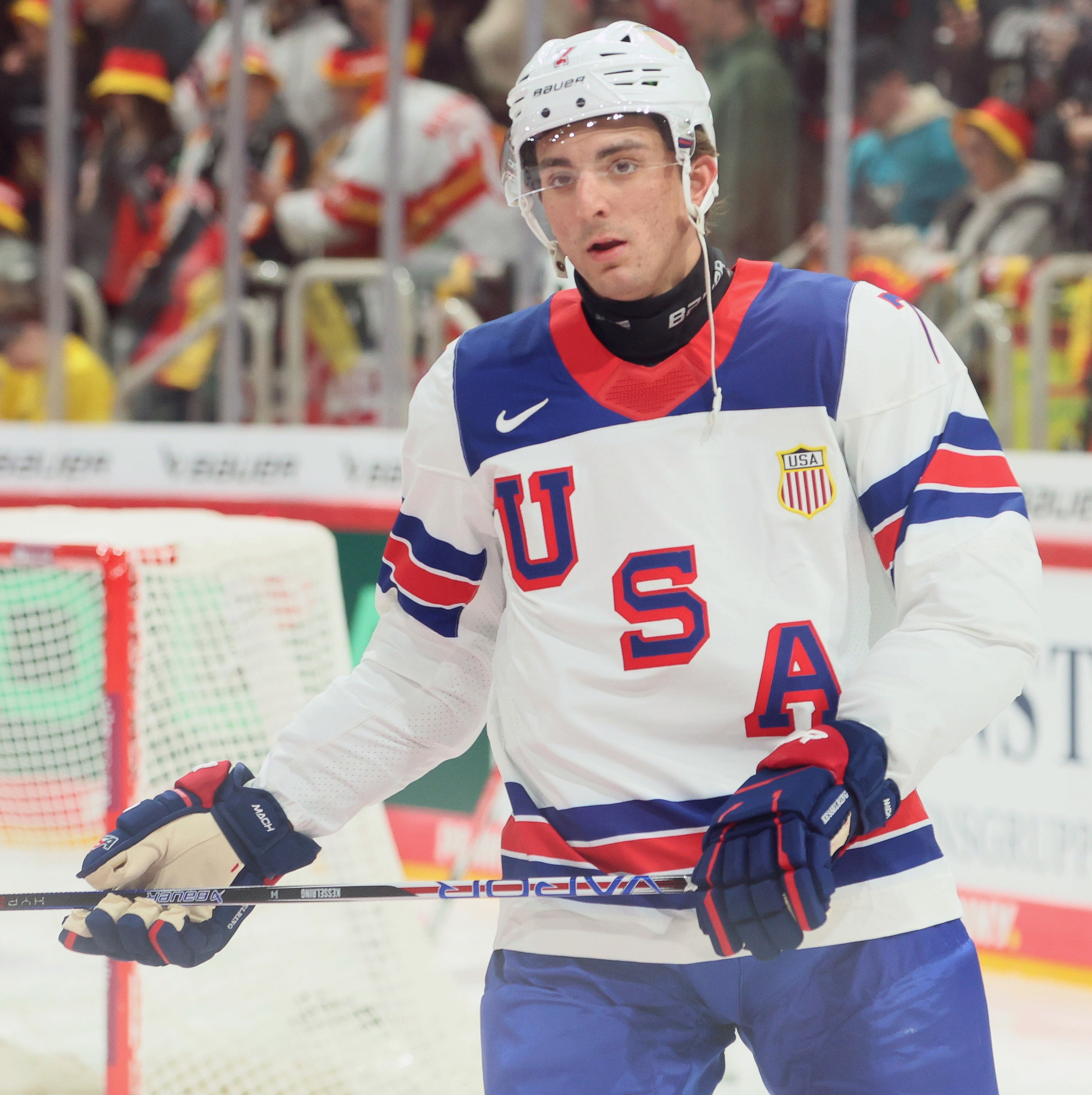
- Kesselring in 2025
- Born: January 13, 2000 (age 26) Florence, South Carolina, U.S.
- Height: 6 ft 5 in (196 cm)
- Weight: 215 lb (98 kg; 15 st 5 lb)
- Position: Defense
- Shoots: Right
- NHL team Former teams: San Jose Sharks; Arizona Coyotes; Utah Hockey Club; Buffalo Sabres
- National team: United States
- NHL draft: 164th overall, 2018; Edmonton Oilers
- Playing career: 2021–present

Michael Alan Kesselring (born January 13, 2000) is an American professional ice hockey player who is a defenseman for the San Jose Sharks of the National Hockey League (NHL). He was selected 164th overall by the Edmonton Oilers in the 2018 NHL entry draft and made his NHL debut in the 2022–23 season.

== Playing career ==
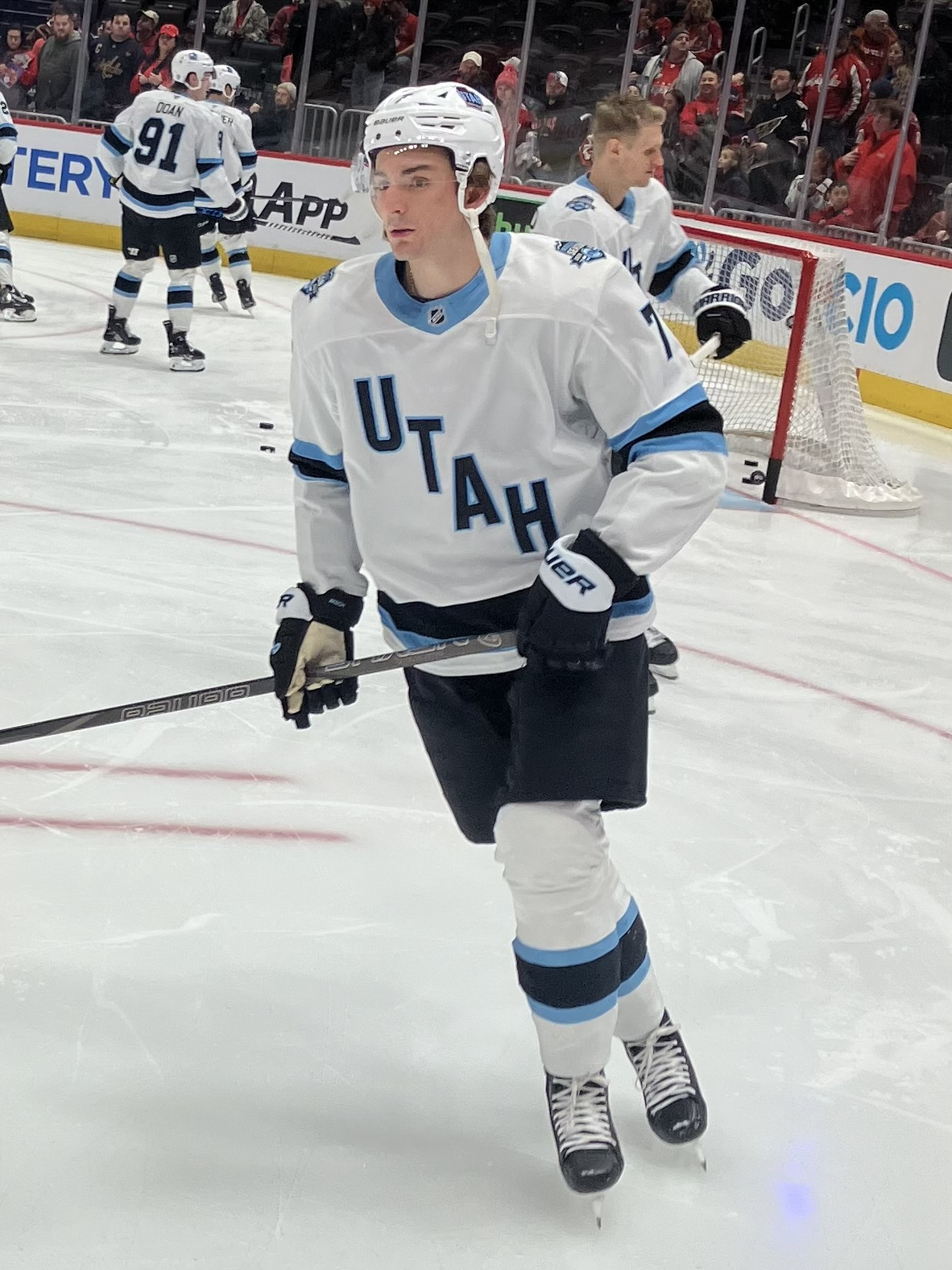
Kesselring with the Utah Hockey Club in 2025

Kesselring played high school hockey for the New Hampton School within the New England Preparatory School Athletic Council before spending the conclusion of the 2017–18 season with the Des Moines Buccaneers of the United States Hockey League (USHL). In his first year of eligibility, with standout physical attributes and strong hockey sense, Kesselring was selected by the Edmonton Oilers of the National Hockey League (NHL) in the sixth round, 164th overall, of the 2018 NHL entry draft.

In his only full season in the USHL in 2018–19, Kesselring split the season between the Buccaneers and the Fargo Force before committing to a collegiate career with Northeastern University of the Hockey East.

During his sophomore season in the NCAA, Kesselring opted to conclude his collegiate career and turn professional for the remainder of the 2020–21 season, signing a three-year, entry-level contract with the Edmonton Oilers on March 22, 2021. Appearing with their American Hockey League (AHL) affiliate, the Bakersfield Condors, on an amateur tryout basis, Kesselring collected three points through 21 regular season games and making six post-season appearances. In his first full professional season in 2021–22, Kesselring established himself on the Condors blueline, registering 2 goals and 13 points through 55 regular season games.

Continuing with the Condors in his third season in the AHL in 2022–23 season, Kesselring showed offensive development by scoring 13 goals and 22 points through only 49 games with Bakersfield. Approaching the NHL trade deadline, Kesselring was traded by the Oilers along with a 2023 third-round pick to the Arizona Coyotes in exchange for Nick Bjugstad and Cam Dineen on March 2, 2023. He was immediately recalled by the Coyotes and made his NHL debut the following day in a 6–1 defeat to the Carolina Hurricanes at Mullett Arena. He was reassigned the following day to the Coyotes AHL affiliate, the Tucson Roadrunners, on March 4, 2023. He was recalled again on March 14, and would play eight more games that season in the NHL, recording his first point, an assist, on March 26, and recording two assists for his first multi-point game on April 13.

Kesselring started the 2023–24 season with the Roadrunners, and was recalled again by the Coyotes on November 16, 2023. He scored his first NHL goal on December 11, in a 5–2 loss against the Buffalo Sabres. He finished the season with 21 points (5 goals, 16 assists) in 65 games.

Before the 2024–25 season, the Arizona Coyotes' hockey operations were sold and transferred to the newly established Utah Hockey Club, including Kesselring's contract. On December 7, 2024, in Kesselring's 100th career NHL game, he recorded the first Gordie Howe hat trick in Utah franchise history, registering a goal, an assist, and a fight, in a 5–2 win against the Buffalo Sabres. In his first season spent entirely in the NHL, Kesselring played in all 82 games and recorded 29 points (7 goals, 22 assists), finishing second in points among defensemen on the team. He also recorded 89 penalty minutes, ranking first on the team and 15th in the NHL.

On June 26, 2025, Kesselring was traded by the newly renamed Utah Mammoth to the Buffalo Sabres, along with Josh Doan, in exchange for JJ Peterka. During the 2025–26 season, Kesselring was hampered by a series of lower-body injuries, recording just two assists in 34 regular season games and one playoff game.

On June 17, 2026, Kesselring was traded by the Sabres to the San Jose Sharks, along with the 27th overall pick in the 2026 NHL entry draft, in exchange for the 20th overall pick in the 2026 draft. He signed a three-year, $13.5M contract with the Sharks on June 28. Kesselring made his Sharks debut in the season opener on October 1 in a 5–4 overtime win against the Florida Panthers, and recorded his first point as a Shark with an assist on October 15, in a 3–2 shootout win against the Nashville Predators. Kesselring played his 200th career NHL game on October 21, in a 4–3 overtime win against the Montreal Canadiens.

== Personal life ==
Kesselring was born in Florence, South Carolina, the son of Casey and Shawndra Kesselring. His father, Casey, played professional hockey at the ECHL level and has served as a minor, high school and junior head coach since 2003. Michael was coached by his father during his high school tenure with New Hampton School. His younger brother, Mason, played junior hockey with the Langley Rivermen and Coquitlam Express in the British Columbia Hockey League (BCHL) and for Curry College in NCAA Division III.

Kesselring is the cousin of "Love Island USA" season 8 finalist Kayda Bosse who finished in fourth place with her partner Zach Gergiou.

== International play ==
Medal record

Men's ice hockey

Representing theUnited States

World Championships
Gold medal – first place	2025 Sweden/Denmark	

Kesselring represented the United States at the 2025 World Championship, where he recorded one goal and three assists in ten games and helped Team USA win their first gold medal since 1933.

== Career statistics ==
=== Regular season and playoffs ===
			Regular season					Playoffs
Season	Team	League	GP	G	A	Pts	PIM	GP	G	A	Pts	PIM
2014–15	New Hampton School	USHS	36	3	4	7	—	—	—	—	—	—
2015–16	New Hampton School	USHS	40	5	11	16	—	—	—	—	—	—
2016–17	New Hampton School	USHS	30	8	20	28	—	—	—	—	—	—
2017–18	New Hampton School	USHS	38	11	23	34	23	—	—	—	—	—
2017–18	Des Moines Buccaneers	USHL	12	0	2	2	2	—	—	—	—	—
2018–19	Des Moines Buccaneers	USHL	33	2	10	12	8	—	—	—	—	—
2018–19	Fargo Force	USHL	33	7	15	22	20	2	0	0	0	0
2019–20	Northeastern University	HE	34	2	3	5	35	—	—	—	—	—
2020–21	Northeastern University	HE	20	5	3	8	23	—	—	—	—	—
2020–21	Bakersfield Condors	AHL	21	1	2	3	10	6	0	3	3	2
2021–22	Bakersfield Condors	AHL	55	2	11	13	45	4	0	0	0	0
2022–23	Bakersfield Condors	AHL	49	13	9	22	40	—	—	—	—	—
2022–23	Arizona Coyotes	NHL	9	0	3	3	6	—	—	—	—	—
2022–23	Tucson Roadrunners	AHL	10	2	5	7	7	3	0	0	0	2
2023–24	Tucson Roadrunners	AHL	6	0	0	0	11	2	0	0	0	0
2023–24	Arizona Coyotes	NHL	65	5	16	21	66	—	—	—	—	—
2024–25	Utah Hockey Club	NHL	82	7	22	29	89	—	—	—	—	—
2025–26	Buffalo Sabres	NHL	34	0	2	2	50	1	0	0	0	0
NHL totals			190	12	43	55	211	1	0	0	0	0

=== International ===
Year	Team	Event	Result	GP	G	A	Pts	PIM
2024	United States	WC	5th	7	2	1	3	0
2025	United States	WC	1st place, gold medalist(s)	10	1	3	4	2
Senior totals				17	3	4	7	2
