= Martin Reichel =

German ice hockey player

Personal information
- Nationality: Czech-German
- Born: 7 November 1973 (age 51) Most, Czechoslovakia

Sport
- Sport: Ice hockey

Martin Reichel (born 7 November 1973) is a Czech-German former ice hockey player. He competed in the men's tournament at the 2002 Winter Olympics. He is the younger brother of Czech ice hockey player Robert Reichel and the father of Lukas Reichel.

== Career statistics ==
=== Regular season and playoffs ===
			Regular season					Playoffs
Season	Team	League	GP	G	A	Pts	PIM	GP	G	A	Pts	PIM
1988–89	TJ CHZ Litvínov	CSSR-U16	29	20	44	64	20	—	—	—	—	—
1989–90	TJ CHZ Litvínov	CSSR-U16	—	—	—	—	—	—	—	—	—	—
1990–91	EHC Freiburg	1.GBun	23	7	8	15	19	5	3	3	6	2
1991–92	EHC Freiburg	1.GBun	27	15	16	31	8	4	1	1	2	4
1992–93	EHC Freiburg	1.GBun	37	13	9	22	27	9	4	4	8	11
1993–94	Sportbund DJK Rosenheim	1.GBun	20	5	15	20	6	6	4	4	8	6
1994–95	Star Bulls Rosenheim GmbH	DEL	43	11	26	37	36	7	3	3	6	37
1995–96	Star Bulls Rosenheim GmbH	DEL	50	17	28	45	40	4	3	0	3	2
1996–97	Star Bulls Rosenheim GmbH	DEL	45	8	14	22	30	3	0	0	0	4
1997–98	Nürnberg Ice Tigers	DEL	45	12	22	34	33	5	1	2	3	2
1998–99	Nürnberg Ice Tigers	DEL	50	11	23	34	16	13	2	3	5	6
1999–2000	Nürnberg Ice Tigers	DEL	54	8	7	15	10	—	—	—	—	—
2000–01	Nürnberg Ice Tigers	DEL	49	9	12	21	18	3	0	2	2	6
2001–02	Nürnberg Ice Tigers	DEL	59	8	23	31	22	4	1	0	1	4
2002–03	Nürnberg Ice Tigers	DEL	39	3	15	18	22	5	0	3	3	2
2003–04	Frankfurt Lions	DEL	52	14	13	27	30	4	1	0	1	2
2004–05	Frankfurt Lions	DEL	37	9	13	22	49	11	0	3	3	10
2005–06	Frankfurt Lions	DEL	48	5	17	22	54	—	—	—	—	—
2006–07	Frankfurt Lions	DEL	34	3	7	10	10	8	0	1	1	8
2007–08	Frankfurt Lions	DEL	49	3	7	10	32	12	0	0	0	2
2008–09	Starbulls Rosenheim e.V.	GER.3	56	11	35	46	36	4	0	0	0	18
2009–10	Starbulls Rosenheim e.V.	GER.3	19	2	8	10	10	10	0	2	2	20
1.GBun totals			107	40	48	88	60	24	12	12	24	23
DEL totals			654	121	227	348	402	79	11	17	28	85

=== International ===
Year	Team	Event	GP	G	A	Pts	PIM
1994	Germany	WC	5	0	1	1	2
1995	Germany	WC	5	0	0	0	2
1996	Germany	WC	6	0	0	0	0
1997	Germany	WC	8	0	1	1	4
1999	Germany	WC B	7	1	2	3	4
2000	Germany	WC B	7	2	3	5	0
2002	Germany	OG	7	1	0	1	0
2002	Germany	WC	6	0	2	2	0
2003	Germany	WC	7	1	1	2	0
2004	Germany	WC	6	0	2	2	2
2004	Germany	WCH	2	0	0	0	0
Senior totals			66	5	12	17	14

"Martin Reichel". Elite Prospects.
