= Judd Caulfield =

American ice hockey player (born 2001)

- Born: March 19, 2001 (age 25) Grand Forks, North Dakota, U.S.
- Height: 6 ft 3 in (191 cm)
- Weight: 220 lb (100 kg; 15 st 10 lb)
- Position: Right wing
- Shoots: Right
- NHL team: Anaheim Ducks
- NHL draft: 145th overall, 2019; Pittsburgh Penguins
- Playing career: 2022–present

Judd Caulfield (born March 19, 2001) is an American professional ice hockey player who is a right winger for the Anaheim Ducks of the National Hockey League (NHL). He played college ice hockey at North Dakota.

== Playing career ==
=== Early years ===
Caulfield was drafted in the fourth round, 145th overall, by the Pittsburgh Penguins in the 2019 NHL entry draft.

=== College ===
On November 20, 2018, he signed his National Letter of Intent to play college ice hockey at North Dakota. During the 2019–20 season, in his freshman year, he recorded four goals and eight assists in 29 games. During the 2020–21 season, in his sophomore year, he recorded four goals and seven assists in 26 games. During the 2021–22 season, in his junior year, he recorded 11 goals and nine assists in 39 games. He led the team with three short-handed goals. During the 2022–23 season, in his senior year, he recorded ten goals and nine assists in 39 games. On March 24, 2023, Judd announced he would return to North Dakota for a fifth year.

=== Professional ===
On March 31, 2023, the Penguins traded the rights to Caulfield to the Anaheim Ducks in exchange for Thimo Nickl. On April 2, 2023, he turned pro and signed a two-year entry-level contract with the Ducks. He joined the Ducks' American Hockey League (AHL) affiliate, the San Diego Gulls on an amateur tryout for the remainder of the 2022–23 season. During the 2023–24 season, in his first full professional season, he recorded ten goals and 16 assists in 61 games. During the 2024–25 season, he recorded 11 goals and 14 assists in 67 games. During the 2025–26 season, he recorded a career-high 17 goals and 21 assists in 71 games.

On July 1, 2026, he signed a two-year, two-way contract with the Ducks. He made the Ducks' opening night roster for the 2026–27 season.

== Career statistics ==
			Regular season					Playoffs
Season	Team	League	GP	G	A	Pts	PIM	GP	G	A	Pts	PIM
2019–20	University of North Dakota	NCHC	29	4	8	12	7	—	—	—	—	—
2020–21	University of North Dakota	NCHC	26	4	7	11	2	—	—	—	—	—
2021–22	University of North Dakota	NCHC	39	11	9	20	10	—	—	—	—	—
2022–23	University of North Dakota	NCHC	39	10	9	19	12	—	—	—	—	—
2022–23	San Diego Gulls	AHL	5	0	0	0	4	—	—	—	—	—
2023–24	San Diego Gulls	AHL	61	10	16	26	20	—	—	—	—	—
2024–25	San Diego Gulls	AHL	67	11	14	25	40	—	—	—	—	—
2025–26	San Diego Gulls	AHL	71	17	21	38	14	2	0	0	0	0
AHL totals			204	38	51	89	78	2	0	0	0	0
