= Maksymilian Szuber =

German ice hockey player (born 2002)

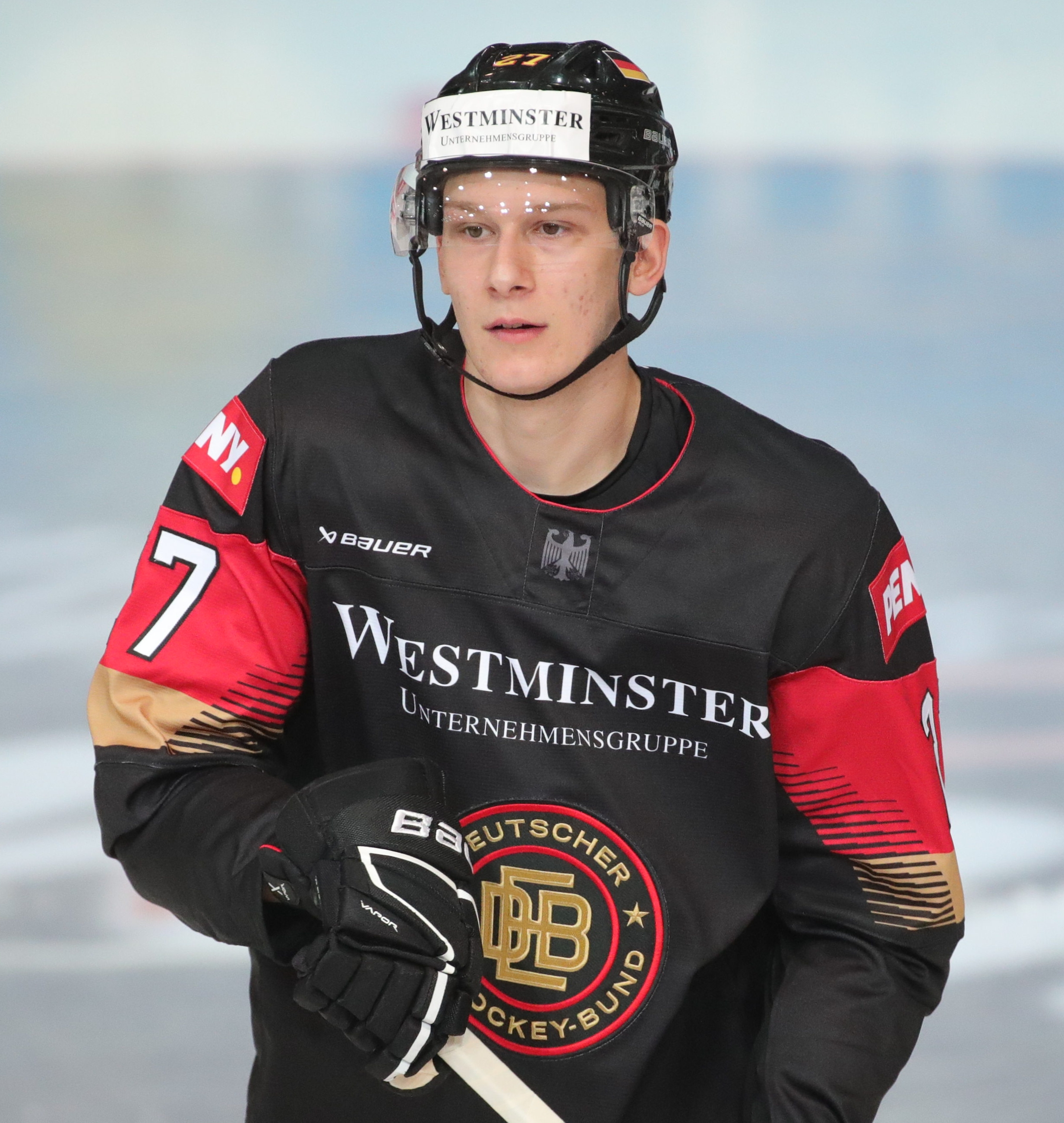
- Szuber in 2023
- Born: 25 August 2002 (age 24) Opole, Poland
- Height: 6 ft 3 in (191 cm)
- Weight: 215 lb (98 kg; 15 st 5 lb)
- Position: Defence
- Shoots: Left
- NHL team (P) Cur. team Former teams: Montreal Canadiens; Laval Rocket (AHL); EHC München; Arizona Coyotes
- National team: Germany
- NHL draft: 163rd overall, 2022; Arizona Coyotes
- Playing career: 2021–present

Maksymilian Szuber (born 25 August 2002) is a Polish-born German professional ice hockey player who is a defenceman for the Laval Rocket of the American Hockey League (AHL) while under contract to the Montreal Canadiens of the National Hockey League (NHL). He was selected in the sixth round, 163rd overall, by the Arizona Coyotes in the 2022 NHL entry draft.

== Playing career ==
Szuber was selected by the Arizona Coyotes in the sixth round, 163rd overall, of the 2022 NHL entry draft. Following three seasons in the Deutsche Eishockey Liga (DEL) with Red Bull München, culminating with a league championship in the 2022–23 season, he was signed by the Coyotes to a three-year, entry-level contract on 1 May 2023.

During the 2023–24 season, Szuber was recalled from assignment with the Tucson Roadrunners of the American Hockey League (AHL) by the Coyotes, and made his NHL debut on 9 April 2024, against the Seattle Kraken.

On 29 June 2026, Szuber was traded to the Montreal Canadiens in exchange for Joshua Roy. Entering the off-season as a restricted free agent, he was immediately tendered a Restricted free agent#NHL by the Canadiens. Thereafter, Szuber agreed to a one-year, two-way contract with the team on 3 August.

== Career statistics ==
=== Regular season and playoffs ===
			Regular season					Playoffs
Season	Team	League	GP	G	A	Pts	PIM	GP	G	A	Pts	PIM
2020–21	RB Hockey Juniors	AlpsHL	29	3	8	11	12	2	0	0	0	0
2020–21	Red Bull München	DEL	2	0	0	0	0	—	—	—	—	—
2021–22	Red Bull München	DEL	35	1	6	7	6	10	0	0	0	0
2022–23	Red Bull München	DEL	46	3	7	10	8	15	0	2	2	8
2023–24	Tucson Roadrunners	AHL	70	7	21	28	48	2	0	1	1	0
2023–24	Arizona Coyotes	NHL	1	0	0	0	2	—	—	—	—	—
2024–25	Tucson Roadrunners	AHL	65	7	25	32	47	3	0	0	0	0
2025–26	Tucson Roadrunners	AHL	65	11	16	27	67	—	—	—	—	—
DEL totals			83	4	13	17	14	25	0	2	2	8
NHL totals			1	0	0	0	2	—	—	—	—	—

=== International ===
Year	Team	Event	Result	GP	G	A	Pts	PIM
2019	Germany	U18-D1	11th	5	0	5	5	0
2021	Germany	WJC	6th	2	0	0	0	0
2022	Germany	WJC	6th	5	0	1	1	0
2023	Germany	WC	2nd place, silver medalist(s)	10	1	0	1	31
2024	Germany	WC	6th	6	1	1	2	4
2025	Germany	WC	9th	6	0	0	0	0
Junior totals				12	0	6	6	0
Senior totals				22	2	1	3	35

== Awards and honours ==
Award	Year	Ref
DEL
Champion	2023	
