= Thimo Nickl =

Austrian ice hockey player

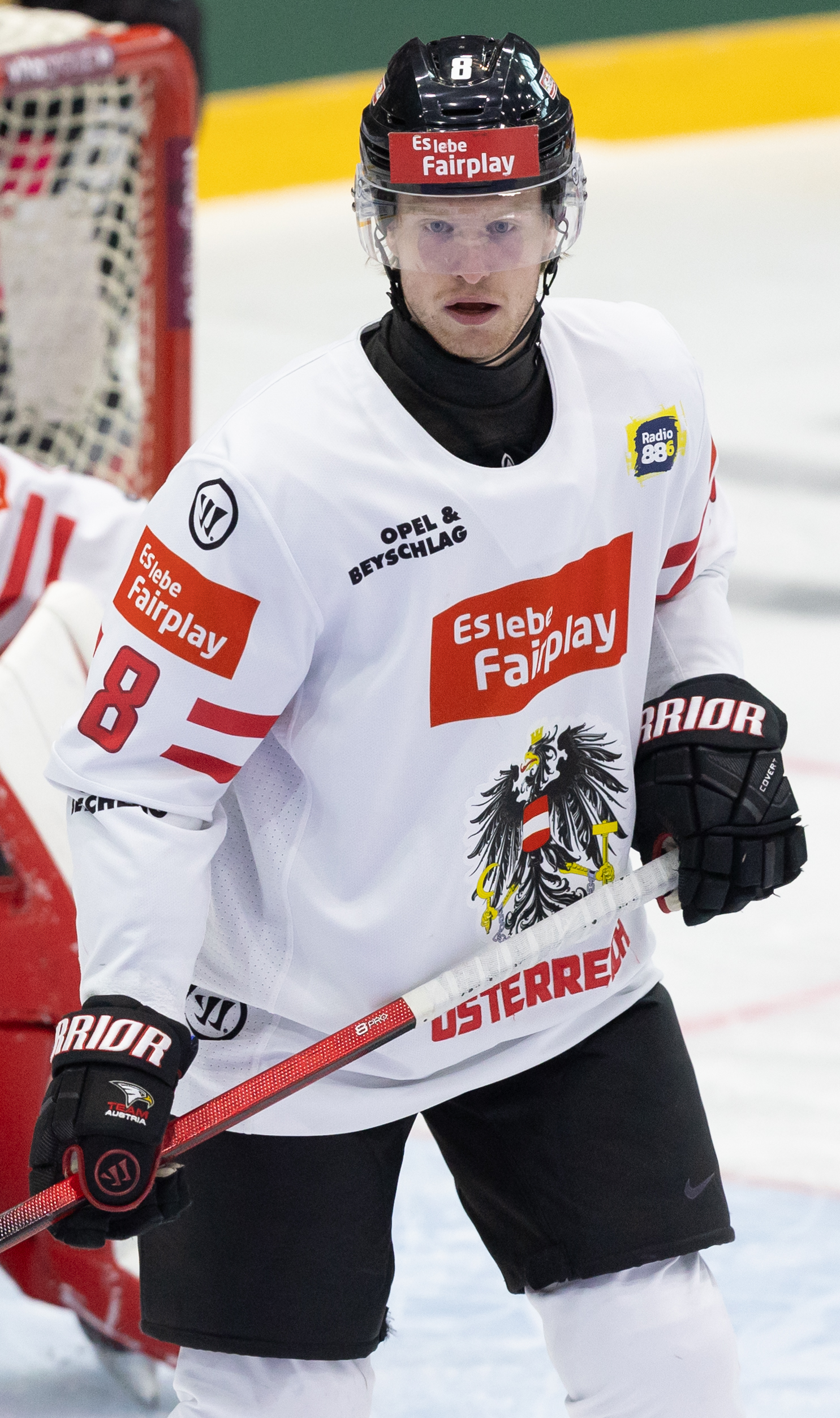
- Nickl in 2026
- Born: 4 December 2001 (age 24) Klagenfurt, Austria
- Height: 6 ft 2 in (188 cm)
- Weight: 176 lb (80 kg; 12 st 8 lb)
- Position: Defence
- Shoots: Right
- ICEHL team Former teams: EC KAC; Rögle BK
- National team: Austria
- NHL draft: 140th overall, 2020; Anaheim Ducks
- Playing career: 2017–present

Thimo Nickl (born 4 December 2001) is an Austrian professional ice hockey player who is a defenceman for EC KAC of the ICE Hockey League (ICEHL). Nickl was drafted by the Anaheim Ducks, 120th overall, in the 2020 NHL entry draft.

== Playing career ==
Nickl began his career with hometown club EC KAC in Klagenfurt and worked his way through the club's youth teams. He made his adult debut for the club in October 2016 in the Alps Hockey League. In 2019, he joined Drummondville Voltigeurs in the Quebec Maritimes Junior Hockey League.

Nickl was drafted in the 4th round, 104th overall, in the 2020 NHL entry draft by the Anaheim Ducks. In the process, he became the first Austrian player ever selected by the club and the first player from Klagenfurt ever taken in the draft by any team. In 2020, the player remained in Europe because of the COVID-19 pandemic and joined Rögle BK of the Swedish Hockey League. During the season, he was loaned out to AIK IF. During the loan, Nickl recorded ten points in thirty-eight appearances, prompting AIK to sign the player permanently the following season.

On 30 March 2023, it was announced that Nickl's NHL rights had been traded to the Pittsburgh Penguins in exchange for Judd Caulfield. Following three seasons of playing in Sweden, Nickl signed with the Wilkes-Barre/Scranton Penguins of the American Hockey League in July 2023 with the Penguins organization retaining his league rights until 1 June 2024. With the contract, he became the first-ever player from Austria to join Wilkes-Barre. Nickl was assigned to the Penguins' ECHL affiliate, the Wheeling Nailers, in October 2023. In the process, he became the first-ever Austrian player to join the club. He made his debut for the club on 15 October 2023 in a game against the Cincinnati Cyclones in the Nailers' opening game of the 2023–24 ECHL season. Within the first three minutes, Nickl assisted on a goal by David Jankowski in the eventual 4–1 victory. He scored his first professional goal in North America against the Reading Royals on 5 November.

In February 2024, it was announced that Nickl had re-signed for EC KAC and would return to the club by summer 2024, at the latest. The deal included the European rights for the player and various exit clauses. He was re-activated on the Nailers roster in March 2024 to finish out the ECHL season.

== Career statistics ==
=== Regular season and playoffs ===
			Regular season					Playoffs
Season	Team	League	GP	G	A	Pts	PIM	GP	G	A	Pts	PIM
2016–17	EC KAC II	AlpsHL	6	0	0	0	4	—	—	—	—	—
2017–18	EC KAC II	AlpsHL	25	1	0	1	10	—	—	—	—	—
2018–19	EC KAC II	AlpsHL	24	2	13	15	20	—	—	—	—	—
2019–20	Drummondville Voltigeurs	QMJHL	58	10	29	39	43	—	—	—	—	—
2020–21	Rögle BK	J20	9	1	4	5	16	—	—	—	—	—
2020–21	Rögle BK	SHL	15	0	0	0	2	—	—	—	—	—
2020–21	Mora IK	Allsv	3	0	0	0	4	—	—	—	—	—
2021–22	AIK IF	Allsv	38	2	8	10	22	—	—	—	—	—
2022–23	AIK IF	Allsv	47	0	8	8	69	3	0	0	0	0
2023–24	Wheeling Nailers	ECHL	66	2	19	21	42	9	0	0	0	4
2024–25	EC KAC	ICEHL	47	2	21	23	80	17	2	5	7	8
2025–26	EC KAC	ICEHL	48	2	22	24	28	6	1	2	3	10
SHL totals			15	0	0	0	2	—	—	—	—	—
ICEHL totals			95	4	43	47	108	23	3	7	10	18

=== International ===
Year	Team	Event	Result	GP	G	A	Pts	PIM
2018	Austria	WJC18-D1	18th	5	0	1	1	0
2018	Austria	WJC-D1	15th	5	0	0	0	0
2019	Austria	WJC18-D1	18th	5	1	8	9	20
2019	Austria	WJC-D1	15th	5	0	0	0	4
2020	Austria	WJC-D1	11th	5	0	3	3	0
2023	Austria	WC	14th	7	0	0	0	0
2024	Austria	WC	10th	5	1	1	2	0
2024	Austria	OGQ	DNQ	3	0	0	0	0
2025	Austria	WC	8th	8	0	0	0	2
2026	Austria	WC	11th	7	2	4	6	2
Junior totals				25	1	12	13	24
Senior totals				30	3	5	8	4
