= Lukas Reichel =

German ice hockey player (born 2002)

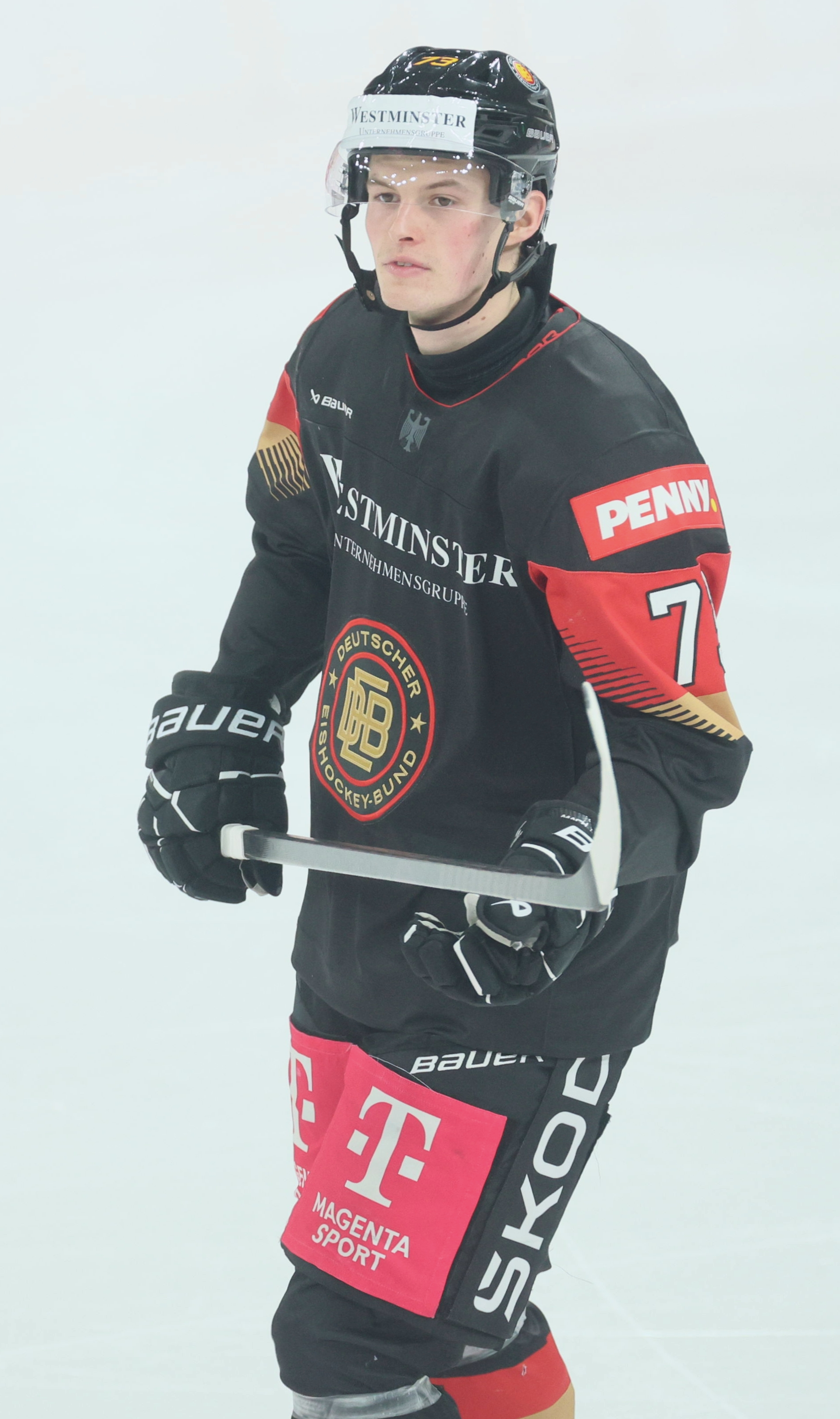
- Reichel with Germany in 2025
- Born: 17 May 2002 (age 24) Nuremberg, Germany
- Height: 6 ft 0 in (183 cm)
- Weight: 170 lb (77 kg; 12 st 2 lb)
- Position: Forward
- Shoots: Left
- NHL team (P) Cur. team Former teams: Boston Bruins; Providence Bruins (AHL); Eisbären Berlin; Chicago Blackhawks; Vancouver Canucks
- National team: Germany
- NHL draft: 17th overall, 2020; Chicago Blackhawks
- Playing career: 2019–present

Lukas Reichel (born 17 May 2002) is a German professional ice hockey player who is a forward for the Providence Bruins of the American Hockey League (AHL) while under contract to the Boston Bruins of the National Hockey League (NHL). He was selected 17th overall by the Chicago Blackhawks in the 2020 NHL entry draft.

== Playing career ==
Reichel played as a youth in the German Development League (DNL) with Starbulls Rosenheim and within the Eisbären Berlin organization. He made his Deutsche Eishockey Liga (DEL) debut with Eisbären Berlin during the 2019–20 season. He was drafted by the Chicago Blackhawks in the first round of the 2020 NHL entry draft with the 17th overall pick.

On 9 June 2021, Reichel was signed to a three-year, entry-level contract with the Chicago Blackhawks.

Reichel made his NHL debut on 13 January 2022, in a 3–2 win against the Montreal Canadiens. He appeared in 11 games with the Blackhawks during the remainder of the 2021–22 season, where he registered one assist. Reichel failed to make the opening day roster for the Blackhawks heading into the 2022–23 season. He was instead sent down to the team's American Hockey League (AHL) affiliate, the Rockford IceHogs, where he spent most of the season. Reichel tallied 20 goals and 31 assists in 55 games for Rockford. He was recalled to the Blackhawks for 23 games during the same season, where he put up seven goals and eight assists.

Reichel made the Blackhawks' opening day roster for the 2023–24 season. He failed to bring his AHL-level production to the Blackhawks, and was moved from centre to wing following inconsistent play. Reichel, who was a healthy scratch for five games during the season, was sent down to Rockford on 18 February 2024 after mustering only 10 points in 50 games for the Blackhawks. The Blackhawks recalled him on March 15, where he played in the remaining 15 games of the season. Reichel finished the season with 5 goals and 11 assists in 65 games with the Blackhawks. He was reassigned to Rockford following the end of the Blackhawks' 2023–24 season to help the IceHogs in the 2024 Calder Cup playoffs.

After the season, and as a pending restricted free agent, Reichel was re-signed by the Blackhawks to a two-year, $2.4 million contract extension on 7 May 2024. Reichel spent the entire 2024–25 season with the Blackhawks, where he appeared in 70 games, posting an NHL career-high 8 goals and 14 assists.

During the first month of the 2025–26 season, on 24 October 2025, Reichel was traded by the Blackhawks to the Vancouver Canucks for a fourth-round pick in the 2027 NHL entry draft. He recorded only one assist for Vancouver in 14 games before he was placed on waivers on 13 December. After spending the following two months with the Abbotsford Canucks, Reichel was traded to the Boston Bruins on 6 March 2026, in exchange for a 2026 sixth-round pick. Reichel originally reported to the Bruins' AHL affiliate, the Providence Bruins, playing four games before being called up to Boston on an emergency basis. In his first game as a Bruin against the Winnipeg Jets, Reichel scored his first goal as a Bruin.

== Personal life ==
He is the son of Czech-German hockey player Martin Reichel, and the nephew of former NHLer and Olympic gold medal winner Robert Reichel.

== Career statistics ==
=== Regular season and playoffs ===
| | | | Regular season | | | | | Playoffs |
| Season | Team | League | GP | G | A | Pts | PIM | GP | G | A | Pts | PIM |
|---|---|---|---|---|---|---|---|---|---|---|---|---|
| 2017–18 | Starbulls Rosenheim | DNL | 18 | 13 | 16 | 29 | 4 | — | — | — | — | — |
| 2018–19 | Eisbären Juniors Berlin | DNL | 32 | 11 | 31 | 42 | 4 | 5 | 3 | 4 | 7 | 0 |
| 2019–20 | Eisbären Berlin | DEL | 42 | 12 | 12 | 24 | 0 | — | — | — | — | — |
| 2020–21 | Eisbären Berlin | DEL | 38 | 10 | 17 | 27 | 6 | 9 | 2 | 3 | 5 | 4 |
| 2021–22 | Rockford IceHogs | AHL | 56 | 21 | 36 | 57 | 6 | 5 | 2 | 0 | 2 | 0 |
| 2021–22 | Chicago Blackhawks | NHL | 11 | 0 | 1 | 1 | 0 | — | — | — | — | — |
| 2022–23 | Rockford IceHogs | AHL | 55 | 20 | 31 | 51 | 12 | 5 | 1 | 0 | 1 | 0 |
| 2022–23 | Chicago Blackhawks | NHL | 23 | 7 | 8 | 15 | 6 | — | — | — | — | — |
| 2023–24 | Chicago Blackhawks | NHL | 65 | 5 | 11 | 16 | 12 | — | — | — | — | — |
| 2023–24 | Rockford IceHogs | AHL | 10 | 1 | 7 | 8 | 4 | 4 | 2 | 2 | 4 | 0 |
| 2024–25 | Chicago Blackhawks | NHL | 70 | 8 | 14 | 22 | 12 | — | — | — | — | — |
| 2025–26 | Chicago Blackhawks | NHL | 5 | 2 | 2 | 4 | 2 | — | — | — | — | — |
| 2025–26 | Vancouver Canucks | NHL | 14 | 0 | 1 | 1 | 4 | — | — | — | — | — |
| 2025–26 | Abbotsford Canucks | AHL | 23 | 6 | 7 | 13 | 0 | — | — | — | — | — |
| 2025–26 | Providence Bruins | AHL | 4 | 1 | 5 | 6 | 0 | 3 | 0 | 0 | 0 | 2 |
| 2025–26 | Boston Bruins | NHL | 10 | 1 | 2 | 3 | 0 | 1 | 0 | 0 | 0 | 0 |
| DEL totals | | | 80 | 22 | 29 | 51 | 6 | 9 | 2 | 3 | 5 | 4 |
| NHL totals | | | 198 | 23 | 39 | 62 | 36 | 1 | 0 | 0 | 0 | 0 |

=== International ===
| Year | Team | Event | Result | GP | G | A | Pts | PIM |
|---|---|---|---|---|---|---|---|---|
| 2019 | Germany | U18-D1 | 11th | 5 | 3 | 2 | 5 | 0 |
| 2020 | Germany | WJC | 9th | 7 | 3 | 2 | 5 | 0 |
| 2021 | Germany | WC | 4th | 9 | 2 | 4 | 6 | 0 |
| 2022 | Germany | WC | 7th | 4 | 2 | 3 | 5 | 0 |
| 2024 | Germany | WC | 6th | 6 | 3 | 4 | 7 | 0 |
| 2025 | Germany | WC | 9th | 3 | 1 | 3 | 4 | 0 |
| 2026 | Germany | OG | 6th | 5 | 2 | 1 | 3 | 0 |
| 2026 | Germany | WC | 10th | 6 | 4 | 4 | 8 | 0 |
| Junior totals | | | | 12 | 6 | 4 | 10 | 0 |
| Senior totals | | | | 33 | 14 | 19 | 33 | 0 |

== Awards and honors ==
| Award | Year | Ref |
DEL
| Champion | 2021 | |

Awards and achievements
| Preceded by Kirby Dach | Chicago Blackhawks first-round draft pick 2020 | Succeeded by Nolan Allan |
