= Tim Stützle =

German ice hockey player (born 2002)

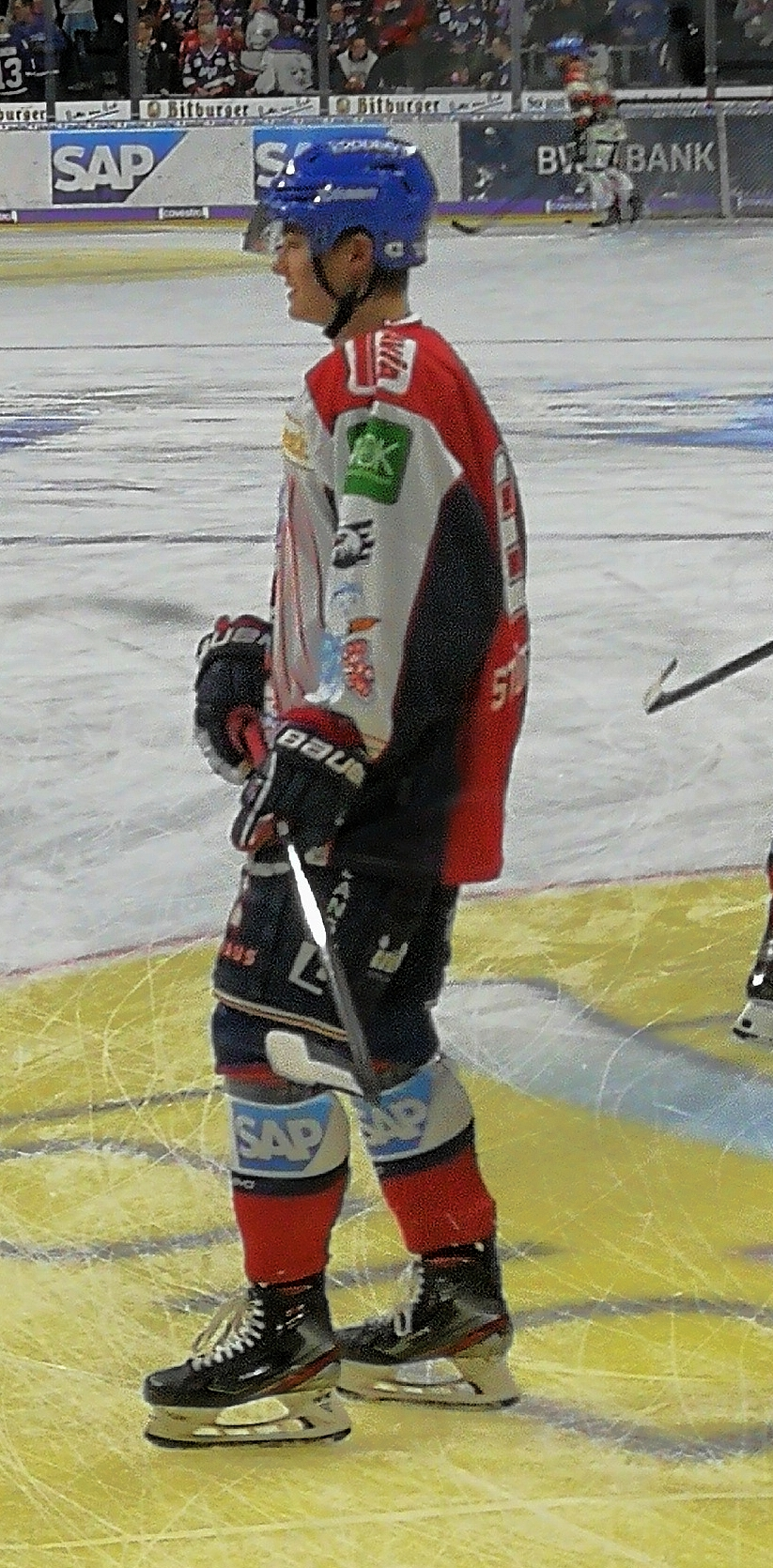
- Stützle with Adler Mannheim in 2020
- Born: 15 January 2002 (age 24) Viersen, Germany
- Height: 6 ft 0 in (183 cm)
- Weight: 197 lb (89 kg; 14 st 1 lb)
- Position: Centre
- Shoots: Left
- NHL team Former teams: Ottawa Senators; Adler Mannheim
- National team: Germany
- NHL draft: 3rd overall, 2020; Ottawa Senators
- Playing career: 2019–present

Tim Stützle (surname alternately spelled Stuetzle; STOOTZ-luh; born 15 January 2002) is a German professional ice hockey player who is a centre and alternate captain for the Ottawa Senators of the National Hockey League (NHL). Rated one of the top prospects available for the 2020 NHL entry draft, he was selected third overall by the Senators. He has played for the German national team at the 2026 Winter Olympics.

== Playing career ==
=== Europe ===
Stützle played junior hockey for the Krefelder EV 1981. He was the top scorer on his team for the 2015–16 season. In the 2017–18 season, Stützle transferred to Jungadler Mannheim, scoring 18 goals and 29 assists. Despite originally committing to play hockey at the University of New Hampshire, and being selected by the Seattle Thunderbirds in the 2019 Canadian Hockey League (CHL) Import Draft, Stützle opted to remain in Germany, and signed a three-year contract with Adler Mannheim in June 2019. He made his professional debut at the age of 17 in the Champions Hockey League opening round on 30 August 2019 against the Vienna Capitals. He played in 52 games for Adler, scoring seven goals and 34 points as the youngest player in the league.

=== Ottawa Senators ===
On 6 October 2020, Stützle was selected by the Ottawa Senators of the National Hockey League (NHL) in the first round, third overall, of the 2020 NHL entry draft. The selection was made using a pick which they had previously acquired in a 2018 trade with the San Jose Sharks that sent defenceman Erik Karlsson to San Jose. The pick was announced by the Jeopardy! host and former Ottawa resident Alex Trebek, who revealed the selection with a mock Jeopardy! question and answer done in the style of the show. On 13 October, while continuing to train in Germany with Mannheim in preparation for the upcoming pandemic-shortened 2020–21 season, Stützle suffered a broken hand, requiring surgery with a six-to-eight week recovery period.

On 27 December 2020, Stützle signed a three-year, entry-level contract with the Ottawa Senators. He made his NHL debut on 15 January 2021 in a 5–3 victory over the Toronto Maple Leafs. He scored his first NHL goal on 16 January against goaltender Jack Campbell in a 3–2 loss to the Maple Leafs. On 4 February, he tallied his first NHL multi-point game, scoring one and assisting on goals by Thomas Chabot and Connor Brown in a 3–2 win over the Montreal Canadiens. On 2 March, he was announced as the NHL's Rookie of the Month for February of that year, after accumulating 10 points in 14 games. On 8 May, Stützle scored his first NHL hat-trick, in a 4–2 win over the Winnipeg Jets. The Senators failed to qualify for the playoffs in his rookie season. In 53 games, he scored 12 goals and 29 points.

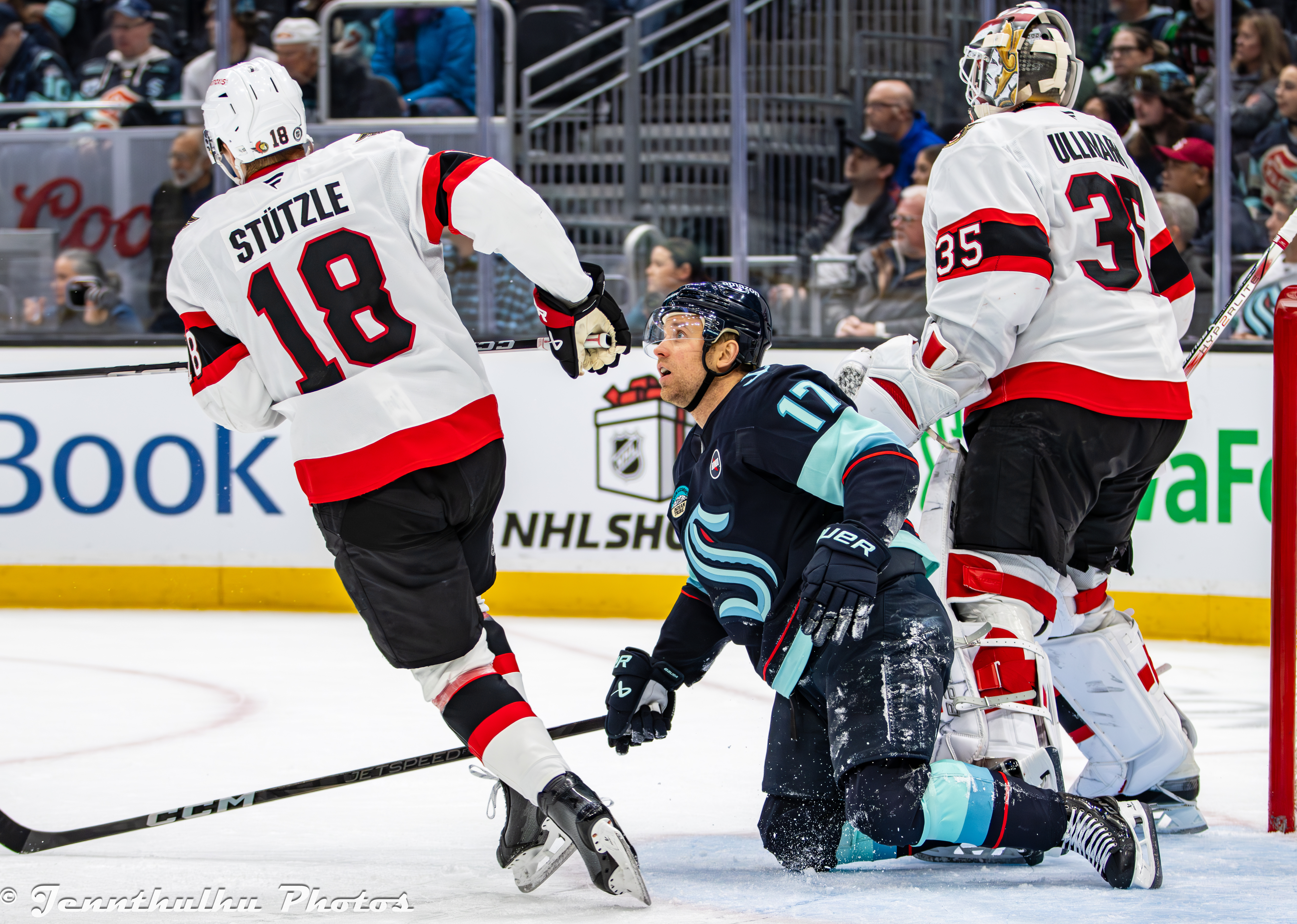
Stützle (left) playing for the Ottawa Senators in 2024

Stützle switched from winger to centre during his second NHL season in 2021–22. He had previously played the position before being drafted and his game significantly improved after the move. On 4 December, he tallied a three-point night, scoring two goals and assisting on another by Brady Tkachuk. Stützle fought Edmonton Oilers defenceman William Lagesson in his first NHL fight on 31 January 2022; and later scored the game's game-winning goal in overtime. On 8 March he marked another three-point night, scoring once and assisting on goals by Josh Norris and Alex Formenton in a 4–1 win over the St. Louis Blues. In April, he had back-to-back three-point nights on 12 and 14 April and recorded a four-point game on 26 April, scoring two goals and assisting on two others by Chabot and Drake Batherson in a 5–4 victory over the New Jersey Devils. He scored 22 goals and 58 points in 79 games, but the team failed to make the playoffs again.

On 7 September 2022, Stützle signed an eight-year, $66.8 million contract extension with the Senators, which was the largest contract in Senators' franchise history, surpassing Thomas Chabot's $64 million contract signed in 2019. On 12 December, Stützle suffered a shoulder injury in a game versus the Anaheim Ducks that kept him out for a week. On 7 January 2023, he recorded his second career hat-trick and added an assist in an 8–4 loss to the Seattle Kraken. On 13 February, he tallied one goal and three assists in a 4–3 win over the Calgary Flames. On 20 February, he was named the NHL's first star of the week after scoring two game-winning goals and ten points in four games. On 28 February, he tallied one goal and two assists on goals by Tkachuk and Claude Giroux in a 6–1 win over the Detroit Red Wings. On 16 March, he marked another three-point night, assisting on goals by Batherson, Tkachuk, and Travis Hamonic in a 5–4 loss to the Colorado Avalanche. By season's end, Stützle set career highs in goals (39), assists (51) and points (90), while establishing himself as one of the young stars of the game. However, for the sixth consecutive season, Ottawa failed to qualify for the playoffs.

Stützle suffered a down year in 2023–24, bothered by injuries during the season. The long-term absences of centres Norris and Shane Pinto also contributed to his decline, as he was asked to take on more duties. On 18 October, he marked a three-point game, assisting on goals by Giroux, Norris, and Jake Sanderson in a 6–1 victory over the Washington Capitals. On 8 November, he tallied four points, scoring once and assisting on two goals by Giroux, and singles by Jakob Chychrun and Dominik Kubalík in a 6–3 win over the Maple Leafs. Eight days later on 16 November, during the NHL Global Series in Sweden, he had a three-point night, scoring once and assisting on two goals by Tkachuk in a 5–4 victory over the Red Wings. On 13 January 2024, he recorded four assists in a 5–4 win over the Sharks and five days later, three points (a goal and two assists) in a 6–2 victory over the Canadiens. On 16 March, he assisted on three goals in a 4–3 overtime victory over the New York Islanders. On 4 April, he was hit high by Florida Panthers defenceman Niko Mikkola, injuring his shoulder, and forcing him to leave the game. He missed the remainder of the season with the injury. In 75 games, he scored 18 goals and 70 points. The Senators missed the playoffs for the seventh consecutive season.

He went into the 2024–25 season with expectations of returning to his previous heights and started off the season strong. On 14 October, he assisted on three goals in an 8–7 victory over the Los Angeles Kings. Later that month on 29 October, he tallied two goals and assisted on two others in an 8–1 win over the Blues. On 23 November, he recorded his 100th career goal against the Vancouver Canucks. Four days later, on 27 November, he assisted on two goals by Adam Gaudette and another by Norris in a 4–3 win over the Sharks. On 1 February 2025, he scored once and assisted on goals by Batherson and Sanderson in a 6–0 shutout victory over the Minnesota Wild. Two days later, he recorded his 300th NHL point assisting on a goal in a 5–2 victory over the Nashville Predators. On 13 April, he scored twice and assisted on another goal by Chabot in a 4–3 win over the Philadelphia Flyers. In the final game of the season, he recorded a three-point game on 17 April in a 7–5 win over the Carolina Hurricanes, scoring once and assisting on goals by Batherson and Gaudette. In 82 games, he tallied 24 goals and 79 points. The Senators qualified for the playoffs for the first time in Stützle's career, facing the Toronto Maple Leafs in the opening round. He made his playoff debut on 20 April and recorded his first NHL playoff point in game two, assisting on a goal by Gaudette. In game four on 26 April, he notched his first NHL playoff goal. In game five, he recorded three points, scoring once and assisting on goals by Chabot and Tkachuk. The Senators were eliminated in six games in their best-of-seven series. In the six games, Stützle tallied two goals and five points.

Now having been to the playoffs, Stützle had developed into one of the league's top forwards, improving his defence significantly. He, along with the rest of the Senators, entered the 2025–26 season with greater expectations. On 27 October, he scored twice and assisted on another goal by Nick Cousins in a 7–2 win over the Boston Bruins. He repeated the feat against the Bruins on 13 November. On 15 December, he assisted on all three Senators' goals in a 3–2 victory over the Jets. Five days later on 20 December, he scored once and assisted on goals by Tkachuk and David Perron in a 6–4 victory over the Chicago Blackhawks. On 7 April, he tallied one goal and assisted on goals by Sanderson and Jordan Spence in a 6–2 win over the Tampa Bay Lightning. In the end, he took a large step forward in his play, seeing more defensive and shorthanded time as head coach Travis Green trusted him with more responsibilities. In 80 games, he scored 34 goals and 83 points. The Senators made the playoffs again, but were swept in the first round by the Carolina Hurricanes. He struggled offensively in the series, marking only one assist in the four games.

== International play ==
Stützle was selected as the best player on Germany junior team at the end of the first qualifying match against Kazakhstan in the 2020 World Junior Championships. He had five assists during the tournament, and averaged 18 minutes of ice time in five games, and was an A-rated skater. In the 2021 World Junior Championships, Stützle was named team captain for Germany and led them to the playoff round for the first time in World Juniors history. He tallied five goals and five assists in five games and was named player of the game for the team's second game against Canada. After the tournament ended, Stützle was named best forward by the directorate and one of the members of the media all-star team.

Stützle played for the German national team in the 2022 World Championship, where he was injured and left the tournament after three games. He played for Germany at the 2025 IIHF World Championships. He was also named to the national roster for the 2026 Winter Olympics.

== Career statistics ==
=== Regular season and playoffs ===
			Regular season					Playoffs
Season	Team	League	GP	G	A	Pts	PIM	GP	G	A	Pts	PIM
2017–18	Jungadler Mannheim	DNL	25	18	29	47	8	5	4	4	8	2
2018–19	Jungadler Mannheim	DNL	21	23	32	55	30	5	4	7	11	4
2019–20	Adler Mannheim	DEL	41	7	27	34	12	—	—	—	—	—
2020–21	Ottawa Senators	NHL	53	12	17	29	14	—	—	—	—	—
2021–22	Ottawa Senators	NHL	79	22	36	58	37	—	—	—	—	—
2022–23	Ottawa Senators	NHL	78	39	51	90	54	—	—	—	—	—
2023–24	Ottawa Senators	NHL	75	18	52	70	28	—	—	—	—	—
2024–25	Ottawa Senators	NHL	82	24	55	79	46	6	2	3	5	2
2025–26	Ottawa Senators	NHL	80	34	49	83	39	4	0	1	1	0
DEL totals			41	7	27	34	12	—	—	—	—	—
NHL totals			447	149	260	409	218	10	2	4	6	2

=== International ===
Year	Team	Event	Result	GP	G	A	Pts	PIM
2018	Germany	U18-D1	2nd	5	1	3	4	2
2019	Germany	U18-D1	1st	5	2	7	9	12
2020	Germany	WJC	9th	5	0	5	5	2
2021	Germany	WJC	6th	5	5	5	10	8
2022	Germany	WC	7th	3	0	2	2	4
2025	Germany	WC	9th	5	0	2	2	6
2026	Germany	OG	6th	5	4	2	6	0
Junior totals				20	8	20	28	24
Senior totals				13	4	6	10	10

Awards and achievements
Preceded by Lassi Thomson	Ottawa Senators first-round draft pick 2020	Succeeded by Jake Sanderson
