= Philip Granath =

Norwegian ice hockey player

- Born: October 5, 2002 (age 23) Asker, Norway
- Height: 170 cm (5 ft 7 in)
- Weight: 72 kg (159 lb; 11 st 5 lb)
- Position: Right wing
- Shoots: Right
- Liiga team Former teams: Tappara; Frölunda HC; Hanhals IF; Rögle BK
- Playing career: 2020–present

Lars Philip Bjørge Granath (born 5 October 2002) is a Norwegian ice hockey right wing who represents Tappara Tampere in the Liiga, the top-tier of ice hockey in Finland. Granath has played two men's World Championship games representing Norway. Granath has previously represented Frölunda HC and Rögle BK in the Swedish Hockey League (SHL).

Granath started his junior career at his local Norwegian club, Frisk Asker. He later moved to the Frölunda HC organization where he made his professional debut. He then moved to Rögle BK where he played 20 junior games and 40 professional games. Granath has played with Tappara in Finland since the 2022–23 season.
