= JJ Peterka =

German ice hockey player (born 2002)

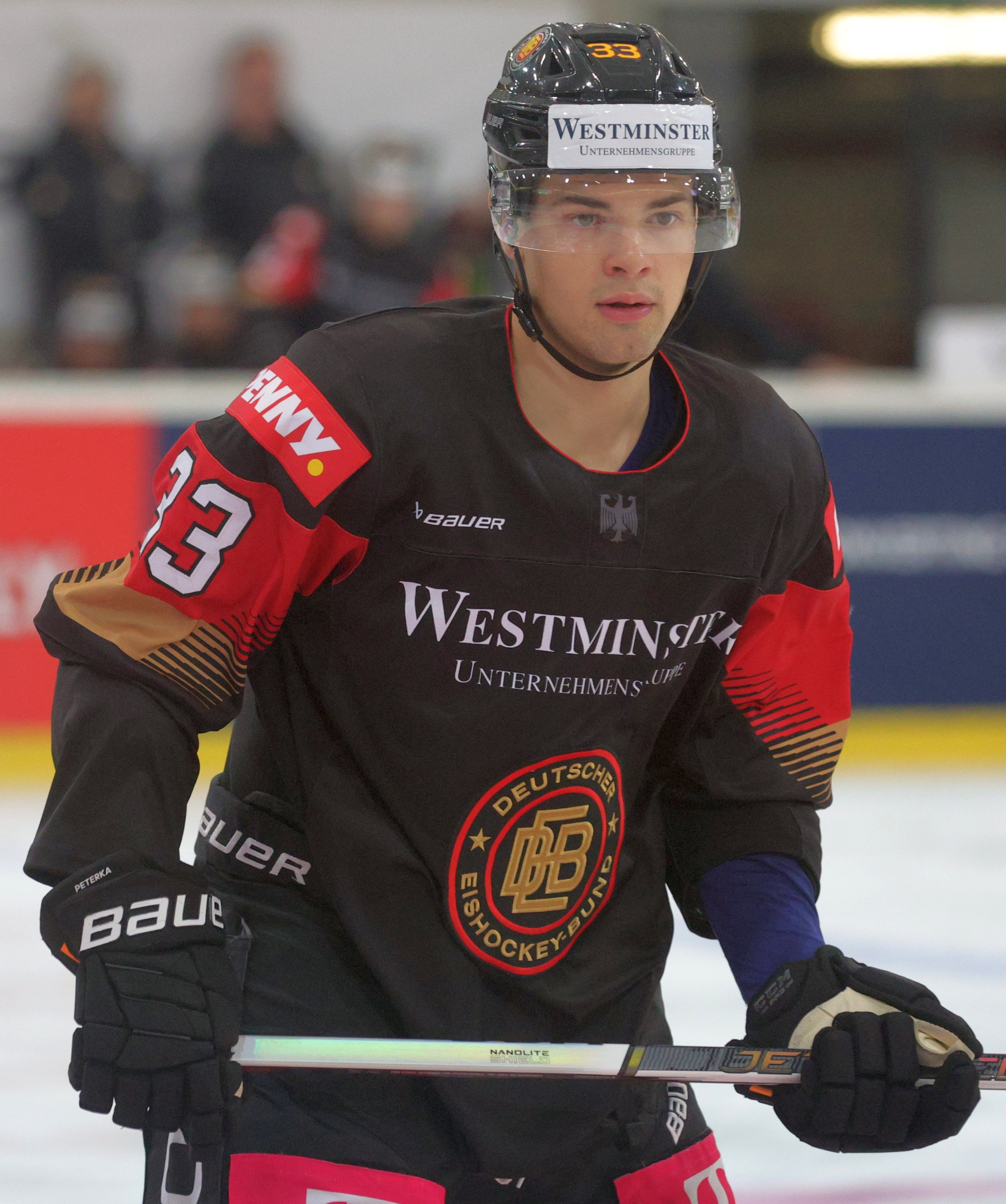
- JJ Peterka with Germany in 2023
- Born: 14 January 2002 (age 24) Munich, Germany
- Height: 6 ft 0 in (183 cm)
- Weight: 189 lb (86 kg; 13 st 7 lb)
- Position: Winger
- Shoots: Left
- NHL team Former teams: Boston Bruins; EHC Red Bull München; EC Red Bull Salzburg; Buffalo Sabres; Utah Mammoth
- National team: Germany
- NHL draft: 34th overall, 2020; Buffalo Sabres
- Playing career: 2019–present

John-Jason Peterka (born 14 January 2002) is a German professional ice hockey player who is a winger for the Boston Bruins of the National Hockey League (NHL). He was drafted 34th overall by the Buffalo Sabres in the 2020 NHL entry draft, and made his NHL debut in 2021.

== Playing career ==
Peterka made his professional debut with EHC Red Bull München of the Deutsche Eishockey Liga (DEL). During the 2019–20 season he appeared in 42 games scoring seven goals and four assists for 11 points. Following the season, Peterka was drafted 34th overall in the 2020 NHL entry draft by the Buffalo Sabres. Peterka was projected to be a first-round pick before the draft, but fell to the Buffalo Sabres in the second round. He was said to be a great skater with great hands and great ability to make plays at top speed, while drawing a comparison to Patrick Kane. He was also said to be an unrelenting player who never gives up on the puck. Following the draft, Peterka went back to the DEL and played 30 games while scoring 9 goals and 11 assists for 20 points in the 2020–21 season.

On 12 June 2021, Peterka was signed by the Buffalo Sabres to a three-year, entry-level contract. During the 2021–22 season, Peterka played for the Rochester Americans, the American Hockey League (AHL) affiliate of the Buffalo Sabres. He appeared in 70 games during his rookie season, scoring 28 goals and 40 assists for a total of 68 points. He also played in 10 playoff games that year, recording 7 goals and 5 assists for 12 points.

Peterka made his NHL debut with the Sabres on 29 December 2021, in a 4–3 loss against the New Jersey Devils. After the game, the Sabres returned him to the AHL's Rochester Americans.

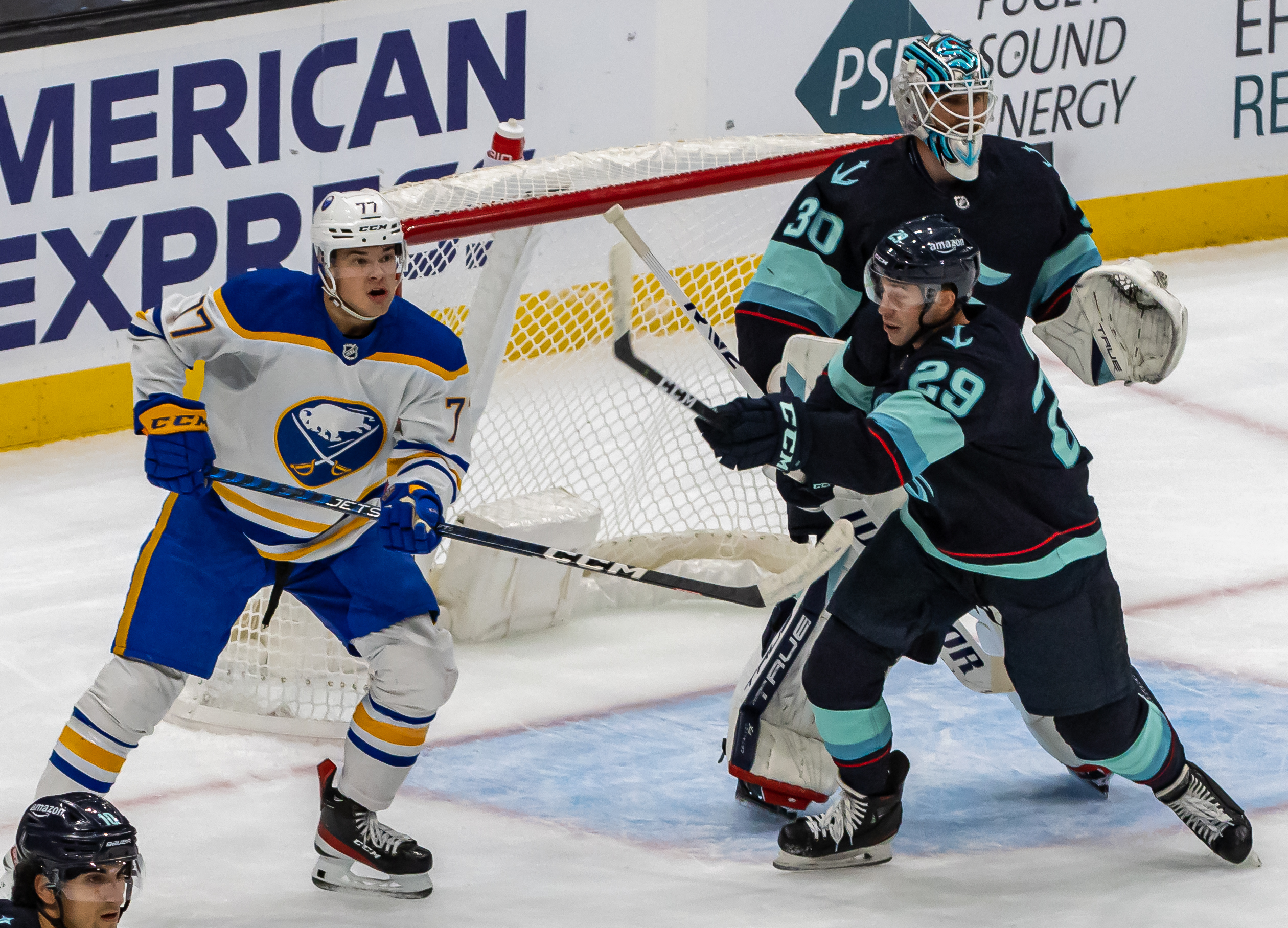
Peterka (left) in a game against the Seattle Kraken in 2022.

Peterka's first NHL goal came in the Sabres' 2022–23 season opener at home against the Ottawa Senators. His goal tied the game at 1–1 en route to a Buffalo 4–1 victory on 13 October 2022.

On 28 January 2025, Peterka scored his first career hat-trick in a 7–2 win over the Boston Bruins.

At the conclusion of the 2024–25 season, on 25 June 2025, as a pending restricted free agent, Peterka was traded from Buffalo to the Utah Mammoth in exchange for Michael Kesselring and Josh Doan. Peterka was immediately signed to a long term five-year, $38.5 million contract extension with the Mammoth. Peterka's production would drop, although he still managed to score 25 goals. He went scoreless in six playoff games for the Mammoth before they were eliminated by the Vegas Golden Knights.

On June 26, 2026, the day of the 2026 NHL entry draft, Peterka was traded to the Boston Bruins for two first round draft picks.

On September 29, 2026, Peterka scored his first goal for the Bruins in a 3-0 win over the New York Rangers in the season-opener.

== International play ==
Medal record

Men's ice hockey

Representing Germany

World Championships
Silver medal – second place	2023 Finland/Latvia	

Peterka made his international debut with the Germany under-18 team at the 2019 World U18 Championship Division I, before joining the junior team for the 2020 and 2021 World Junior Championships.

Joining the senior team for the first time, Peterka made his World Championships debut at the 2021 edition. Two years later, he rejoined the national team for the 2023 World Championship, where Germany embarked on an unexpected deep run through the knockout round, defeating the heavily-favoured United States senior team in the semifinals to reach the gold medal game. Peterka scored the opening goal of the game, but Germany was ultimately defeated by Canada senior team, winning the silver medal, the nation's first at the World Championships since 1953. With six goals and six assists in 10 games, Peterka was given the IIHF directorate award for best forward, and named to the Media All-Star Team.

== Personal life ==
Peterka has two younger siblings, Tiffany and Jack. His German parents pointedly chose American sounding names for their children.

With his father Dennis, Peterka has built Peterka Arena, a performance center featuring a 21 × 12 metre ice pad for skills training. Located in the town of Buchbach, about 35 miles from Munich, it aims to offer year-round conditioning tools in a country where very few rinks operate during the summer. It opened to the public in June 2026.

== Career statistics ==
=== Regular season and playoffs ===
			Regular season					Playoffs
Season	Team	League	GP	G	A	Pts	PIM	GP	G	A	Pts	PIM
2017–18	RB Hockey Academy	Czech.18	18	7	14	21	4	2	4	0	4	0
2018–19	RB Hockey Academy	Czech.19	48	45	49	94	52	—	—	—	—	—
2019–20	EHC Red Bull München	DEL	42	7	4	11	14	—	—	—	—	—
2020–21	EC Red Bull Salzburg	ICEHL	12	7	9	16	12	—	—	—	—	—
2020–21	EHC Red Bull München	DEL	30	9	11	20	8	2	1	0	1	0
2021–22	Rochester Americans	AHL	70	28	40	68	28	10	7	5	12	6
2021–22	Buffalo Sabres	NHL	2	0	0	0	0	—	—	—	—	—
2022–23	Buffalo Sabres	NHL	77	12	20	32	26	—	—	—	—	—
2023–24	Buffalo Sabres	NHL	82	28	22	50	28	—	—	—	—	—
2024–25	Buffalo Sabres	NHL	77	27	41	68	34	—	—	—	—	—
2025–26	Utah Mammoth	NHL	82	25	22	47	28	6	0	0	0	2
DEL totals			72	16	15	31	22	2	1	0	1	0
NHL totals			320	92	105	197	116	6	0	0	0	2

=== International ===
Year	Team	Event	Result	GP	G	A	Pts	PIM
2019	Germany	U18-D1	DNQ	5	2	6	8	0
2020	Germany	WJC	9th	7	4	2	6	16
2021	Germany	WJC	6th	5	4	6	10	2
2021	Germany	WC	4th	6	1	0	1	2
2023	Germany	WC	2nd place, silver medalist(s)	10	6	6	12	0
2024	Germany	WC	6th	8	5	4	9	2
2026	Germany	OG	6th	5	1	3	4	2
Junior totals				17	10	14	24	18
Senior totals				29	13	13	26	6

== Awards and honours ==
Award	Year	Ref
AHL
All-Rookie Team	2022	
International
WC best forward	2023	
WC Media All-Star Team	2023	
