= 2018 IIHF World U18 Championship Division I =

International ice hockey competition

2018 IIHF U18 World Championship Division I

Tournament details
- Host countries: Latvia; Ukraine
- Dates: 2–8 April (Group A); 14–20 April (Group B)
- Teams: 12

The 2018 IIHF U18 World Championship Division I were two international under-18 ice hockey tournaments organised by the International Ice Hockey Federation. The Division I A and Division I B tournaments represent the second and the third tier of the IIHF World U18 Championship.

== Division I A ==
2018 IIHF World U18 Championship Division I A
Tournament details
- Host country: Latvia
- Venue: 1 (in 1 host city)
- Dates: 2–8 April
- Teams: 6

Tournament statistics
- Games played: 15
- Goals scored: 86 (5.73 per game)
- Attendance: 9,057 (604 per game)
- Scoring leader: (Germany) Taro Jentzsch (7 points)

Official website
- IIHF.com

The Division I A tournament was played in Riga, Latvia, from 2 to 8 April 2018.

=== Participants ===
Team	Qualification
Latvia	placed 10th in 2017 Top Division and were relegated
Kazakhstan	placed 2nd in 2017 Division I A
Denmark	placed 3rd in 2017 Division I A
Norway	placed 4th in 2017 Division I A
Germany	placed 5th in 2017 Division I A
Slovenia	placed 1st in 2017 Division I B and were promoted

=== Match officials ===
4 referees and 7 linesmen were selected for the tournament.

Referees

- (Sweden) Patric Bjälkander
- (Finland) Aaro Brännare
- (United States) Andrew Bruggeman
- (Belarus) Andrei Shrubok

Linesmen

- (Latvia) Uldis Bušs
- (Switzerland) Daniel Duarte
- (Latvia) Māris Locāns
- (Finland) Henri Neva
- (Austria) David Nothegger
- (Slovakia) Michal Orolin
- (Japan) Sotaro Yamaguchi

=== Standings ===
Pos	Team	Pld	W	OTW	OTL	L	GF	GA	GD	Pts	Promotion or relegation
1	Latvia (H)	5	5	0	0	0	14	4	+10	15	Promoted to the 2019 Top Division
2	Germany	5	4	0	0	1	22	11	+11	12	
3	Denmark	5	2	0	0	3	14	19	−5	6 (Note: Kazakhstan 2–4 Denmark)	
4	Kazakhstan	5	2	0	0	3	15	10	+5	6	
5	Norway	5	1	0	0	4	14	18	−4	3 (Note: Slovenia 0–5 Norway)	
6	Slovenia	5	1	0	0	4	7	24	−17	3	Relegated to the 2019 Division I B

Source: IIHF
Rules for classification: 1) points; 2) head-to-head points; 3) head-to-head goal difference; 4) head-to-head number of goals scored; 5) result against closest best-ranked team outside tied teams; 6) result against second-best ranked team outside tied teams; 7) seeding before tournament.
(H) Host

=== Results ===
All times are local (UTC+3).

2 April 2018; 12:15	Germany	7–2 (2–0, 4–2, 1–0)	Denmark	Arēna Rīga, Riga; Attendance: 348

Game reference

Florian Mnich
Tobias Ancicka
Goalies
Mads Søgaard
Christian Christensen
Referee:
(Finland) Aaro Brännare
Linesmen:
(Latvia) Uldis Bušs
(Finland) Henri Neva

Brune (Fleischer, Seider) – 11:53	1–0
Valenti (Wirt, Jentzsch) (PP) – 19:42	2–0
Schinko – 23:31	3–0
	3–1	32:06 – Madsen (Kjær)
Fleischer (Stützle) (PP) – 33:38	4–1
Wirt (Alberg, Betzold) – 34:09	5–1
Betzold (Hon, Mik) – 38:09	6–1
	6–2	39:02 – Schultz (Cubars) (PP)
Schinko (Fleischer, Seider) (PP) – 44:52	7–2

8 min
Penalties
8 min
26
Shots
14

2 April 2018; 16:15	Norway	2–5 (1–3, 1–2, 0–0)	Kazakhstan	Arēna Rīga, Riga; Attendance: 349

Game reference

Tobias Breivold
Goalies
Vilen Prokofiev
Referee:
(United States) Andrew Bruggeman
Linesmen:
(Latvia) Māris Locāns
(Japan) Sotaro Yamaguchi

	0–1	07:16 – Buyalsky (Demin, Pryakhin)
Rødne (Hafsmoe) – 10:28	1–1
	1–2	17:50 – Buyalsky (Nesterov)
	1–3	18:19 – O. Boiko (Guseinov)
Rødne (Spaberg Olsen) – 33:02	2–3
	2–4	35:28 – Asukhanov (Atakhanov)
	2–5	36:06 – Pryakhin (Demin, Buyalsky)

2 min
Penalties
6 min
22
Shots
25

2 April 2018; 20:15	Slovenia	1–2 (0–2, 1–0, 0–0)	Latvia	Arēna Rīga, Riga; Attendance: 1,126

Game reference

Val Usnik
Goalies
Artūrs Šilovs
Referee:
(Sweden) Patric Bjälkander
Linesmen:
(Switzerland) Daniel Duarte
(Austria) David Nothegger

	0–1	05:05 – Bergs (Arnicāns, Koppass)
	0–2	17:25 – Grīnbergs (Polcs, Ošenieks)
Tavčar (Predan) – 33:00	1–2

12 min
Penalties
14 min
18
Shots
32

3 April 2018; 12:15	Kazakhstan	0–1 (0–1, 0–0, 0–0)	Germany	Arēna Rīga, Riga; Attendance: 147

Game reference
Vilen Prokofiev	Goalies	Florian Mnich	Referee: (United States) Andrew Bruggeman; Linesmen: (Austria) David Nothegger (Slovakia) Michal Orolin
0–1 / 16:34 – Valenti (Schitz, Schinko)			Referee: (United States) Andrew Bruggeman; Linesmen: (Austria) David Nothegger (Slovakia) Michal Orolin
4 min	Penalties	10 min	Referee: (United States) Andrew Bruggeman; Linesmen: (Austria) David Nothegger (Slovakia) Michal Orolin
15	Shots	33	Referee: (United States) Andrew Bruggeman; Linesmen: (Austria) David Nothegger (Slovakia) Michal Orolin

3 April 2018; 16:15	Denmark	2–3 (1–0, 0–1, 1–2)	Slovenia	Arēna Rīga, Riga; Attendance: 210

Game reference

Mads Søgaard
Goalies
Val Usnik
Referee:
(Belarus) Andrei Shrubok
Linesmen:
(Latvia) Uldis Bušs
(Latvia) Māris Locāns

Kjær (Brøndberg, Schultz) (PP) – 14:47	1–0
	1–1	31:35 – Širovnik (Jenko, Bohinc) (PP)
	1–2	41:41 – Bohinc (Tavčar, Jenko) (PP)
Koch (Andersen) – 50:42	2–2
	2–3	58:34 – Bohinc

10 min
Penalties
8 min
36
Shots
16

3 April 2018; 20:15	Latvia	3–0 (0–0, 1–0, 2–0)	Norway	Arēna Rīga, Riga; Attendance: 983

Game reference

Jānis Voris
Goalies
Tobias Normann
Referee:
(Finland) Aaro Brännare
Linesmen:
(Finland) Henri Neva
(Japan) Sotaro Yamaguchi

Fjodorovs (Mintautišķis) – 24:36	1–0
Grīnbergs (Polcs, Ozols) (PP) – 53:10	2–0
Millers (Ošenieks) (ENG) – 59:39	3–0

14 min
Penalties
12 min
31
Shots
15

5 April 2018; 12:15	Slovenia	0–5 (0–0, 0–4, 0–1)	Norway	Arēna Rīga, Riga; Attendance: 210

Game reference

Val Usnik
Nejc Žagar
Goalies
Tobias Normann
Referee:
(Finland) Aaro Brännare
Linesmen:
(Switzerland) Daniel Duarte
(Finland) Henri Neva

0–1	20:39 – Van Doorn (Lilleberg, Hafsmoe)
0–2	21:01 – Hallgren (Finstad)
0–3	31:45 – Rødne (Van Doorn)
0–4	35:37 – Hafsmoe
0–5	49:07 – Frøberg

6 min
Penalties
6 min
13
Shots
38

5 April 2018; 16:15	Kazakhstan	2–4 (2–1, 0–1, 0–2)	Denmark	Arēna Rīga, Riga; Attendance: 214

Game reference

Vilen Prokofiev
Goalies
Christian Christensen
Referee:
(Sweden) Patric Bjälkander
Linesmen:
(Latvia) Uldis Bušs
(Latvia) Māris Locāns

Musorov (Butenko, O. Boiko) (PP) – 09:17	1–0
	1–1	14:13 – Schultz (True, Kjær) (PP)
O. Boiko (Guseinov) (PP) – 16:50	2–1
	2–2	26:36 – Cubars (Kaels)
	2–3	41:25 – Andersen (Brøndberg, Schultz) (PP)
	2–4	56:49 – Koch (Nielsen)

18 min
Penalties
20 min
22
Shots
23

5 April 2018; 20:15	Latvia	3–1 (1–1, 1–0, 1–0)	Germany	Arēna Rīga, Riga; Attendance: 1,894

Game reference

Jānis Voris
Goalies
Florian Mnich
Referee:
(Belarus) Andrei Shrubok
Linesmen:
(Austria) David Nothegger
(Japan) Sotaro Yamaguchi

	0–1	11:51 – Valenti (Jentzsch) (PP)
Marcinkēvičs (Prohorenkovs, Koppass) – 16:24	1–1
Barkovskis (Marcinkēvičs) – 31:58	2–1
Fjodorovs (Ošenieks) – 48:32	3–1

10 min
Penalties
12 min
15
Shots
27

6 April 2018; 12:15	Kazakhstan	7–1 (3–0, 1–0, 3–1)	Slovenia	Arēna Rīga, Riga; Attendance: 86

Game reference

Vladislav Nurek
Goalies
Val Usnik
Nejc Žagar
Referee:
(Belarus) Andrei Shrubok
Linesmen:
(Latvia) Uldis Bušs
(Finland) Henri Neva

Musorov (Guseinov) – 00:54	1–0
Nesterov (Musabayev, Demin) (PP) – 15:11	2–0
Saiko – 16:35	3–0
Saiko – 28:35	4–0
Buyalsky (Musabayev, Saiko) – 44:34	5–0
O. Boiko (Guseinov, Musorov) – 47:24	6–0
	6–1	48:35 – Prostor (Predan)
Musorov (Guseinov) – 54:28	7–1

8 min
Penalties
10 min
38
Shots
20

6 April 2018; 16:15	Norway	4–5 (1–2, 2–2, 1–1)	Germany	Arēna Rīga, Riga; Attendance: 157

Game reference

Tobias Breivold
Goalies
Florian Mnich
Tobias Ancicka
Referee:
(Sweden) Patric Bjälkander
Linesmen:
(Latvia) Māris Locāns
(Austria) David Nothegger

Spaberg Olsen (Finstad, Meyer) (PP) – 10:18	1–0
	1–1	11:53 – Hon (Möller, Stützle) (EA)
	1–2	13:37 – Schinko (Seider)
Jensen – 23:54	2–2
	2–3	29:09 – Schütz (Jentzsch)
Hurrød (PP) – 31:28	3–3
	3–4	32:07 – Valenti (Schütz, Möller)
	3–5	47:18 – Schütz (Hüttl)
Spaberg Olsen (PP) – 52:40	4–5

10 min
Penalties
14 min
20
Shots
46

6 April 2018; 20:15	Denmark	1–4 (1–1, 0–0, 0–3)	Latvia	Arēna Rīga, Riga; Attendance: 2,200

Game reference

Christian Christensen
Goalies
Jānis Voris
Referee:
(United States) Andrew Bruggeman
Linesmen:
(Switzerland) Daniel Duarte
(Japan) Sotaro Yamaguchi

Cubars (Kaels) – 01:45	1–0
	1–1	08:33 – Ozols (Arnicāns, Koppass)
	1–2	46:06 – Koppass (Fjodorovs) (PP)
	1–3	53:07 – Barkovskis
	1–4	59:35 – Polcs (ENG)

8 min
Penalties
6 min
23
Shots
21

8 April 2018; 12:15	Denmark	5–3 (2–0, 2–2, 1–1)	Norway	Arēna Rīga, Riga; Attendance: 163

Game reference

Mads Søgaard
Goalies
Tobias Normann
Tobias Breivold
Referee:
(Belarus) Andrei Shrubok
Linesmen:
(Switzerland) Daniel Duarte
(Latvia) Māris Locāns

True (Green) – 14:08	1–0
Kaels (Kjær) – 17:24	2–0
Olesen (Koch) – 22:51	3–0
	3–1	26:24 – Vaaler (Mikkelsen, Løkkeberg)
	3–2	30:40 – Van Doorn (Vaaler, Jensen (PP)
Schultz (True, Cubars) (PP) – 39:58	4–2
Schultz (Brøndberg) – 44:52	5–2
	5–3	47:12 – Holm (Vaaler) (PP)

8 min
Penalties
12 min
36
Shots
22

8 April 2018; 16:15	Germany	8–2 (5–2, 1–0, 2–0)	Slovenia	Arēna Rīga, Riga; Attendance: 110

Game reference

Tobias Ancicka
Goalies
Nejc Žagar
Val Usnik
Referee:
(United States) Andrew Bruggeman
Linesmen:
(Latvia) Uldis Bušs
(Japan) Sotaro Yamaguchi

Hon (Alberg, Schinko) – 00:52	1–0
Alberg (Schitz) – 01:08	2–0
Jentzsch (Valenti, Stützle) – 05:52	3–0
	3–1	11:39 – Vilfan (Konc, Tavčar)
Schitz (Alberg) – 12:09	4–1
	4–2	12:51 – Vilfan (Tavčar, Konc)
Valenti (Mik, Möller) – 13:55	5–2
Schitz (Alberg, Betzold) – 22:25	6–2
Schitz (Jentzsch, Wirt) – 47:20	7–2
Stützle (Wirt) – 56:55	8–2

10 min
Penalties
4 min
51
Shots
10

8 April 2018; 20:15	Latvia	2–1 (1–1, 0–0, 1–0)	Kazakhstan	Arēna Rīga, Riga; Attendance: 860

Game reference

Artūrs Šilovs
Goalies
Vladislav Nurek
Referee:
(Finland) Aaro Brännare
Linesmen:
(Finland) Henri Neva
(Austria) David Nothegger

	0–1	04:36 – Musabayev (Demin, Buyalsky) (PP)
Ošenieks (Štolcs, Fjodorovs) (PP2) – 06:58	1–1
Millers – 55:19	2–1

10 min
Penalties
63 min
22
Shots
32

=== Statistics ===
==== Scoring leaders ====
List shows the top ten skaters sorted by points, then goals.

Player	GP	G	A	Pts	+/−	PIM	POS
(Germany) Taro Jentzsch	5	1	6	7	+7	6	F
(Germany) Yannik Valenti	5	5	1	6	+6	2	F
(Denmark) Phillip Schultz	5	4	2	6	0	6	F
(Kazakhstan) Andrei Buyalsky	5	3	2	5	+4	2	F
(Germany) Luis Schinko	5	3	2	5	+2	8	F
(Germany) Edwin Schitz	5	3	2	5	+7	0	F
(Denmark) Victor Cubars	5	2	3	5	+1	2	F
(Germany) Manuel Alberg	5	1	4	5	+5	0	F
(Kazakhstan) Dias Guseinov	5	0	5	5	+2	6	F
(Kazakhstan) Oleg Boiko	5	3	1	4	+2	0	F
(Kazakhstan) Maxim Musorov	5	3	1	4	+1	2	F
(Norway) Lars Christian Rødne	5	3	1	4	−3	2	F

GP = Games played; G = Goals; A = Assists; Pts = Points; +/− = P Plus–minus; PIM = Penalties in minutes; POS = Position
Source: IIHF.com

==== Leading goaltenders ====
Only the top five goaltenders, based on save percentage, who have played 40% of their team's minutes are included in this list.

Player	TOI	SA	GA	GAA	Sv%	SO
(Latvia) Jānis Voris	180:00	65	2	0.67	96.92	1
(Latvia) Artūrs Šilovs	120:00	50	2	1.00	96.00	1
(Kazakhstan) Vladislav Nurek	120:00	42	3	1.50	92.86	0
(Norway) Tobias Normann	140:15	58	5	2.14	91.38	1
(Kazakhstan) Vilen Prokofiev	179:19	78	7	2.34	91.03	0

TOI = Time on ice (minutes:seconds); SA = Shots against; GA = Goals against; GAA = Goals against average; Sv% = Save percentage; SO = Shutouts
Source: IIHF.com

=== Awards ===
Best Players Selected by the Directorate

- Goaltender: (Latvia) Jānis Voris
- Defenceman: (Germany) Moritz Seider
- Forward: (Germany) Yannik Valenti

Source: IIHF.com

== Division I B ==
2018 IIHF World U18 Championship Division I B
Tournament details
- Host country: Ukraine
- Venue: 1 (in 1 host city)
- Dates: 14–20 April
- Teams: 6

Tournament statistics
- Games played: 15
- Goals scored: 80 (5.33 per game)
- Attendance: 33,163 (2,211 per game)
- Scoring leader(s): (Austria) Benjamin Baumgartner (Ukraine) Dmytro Danylenko (8 points)

Official website
- IIHF.com

The Division I B tournament was played in Kyiv, Ukraine, from 14 to 20 April 2018.

=== Participants ===
Team	Qualification
Hungary	placed 6th in 2017 Division I A and were relegated
Austria	placed 2nd in 2017 Division I B
Japan	placed 3rd in 2017 Division I B
Italy	placed 4th in 2017 Division I B
Ukraine	placed 5th in 2017 Division I B
Romania	placed 1st in 2017 Division II A and were promoted

=== Match officials ===
4 referees and 7 linesmen were selected for the tournament.

Referees

- (Czech Republic) Roman Mrkva
- (Switzerland) Joris Müller
- (Norway) Christian Persson
- (Latvia) Gints Zviedrītis

Linesmen

- (Netherlands) Lodewyk Beelen
- (United States) Riley Bowles
- (Norway) Håvar Dahl
- (United Kingdom) James Kavanagh
- (Ukraine) Artem Korepanov
- (Ukraine) Anton Peretyatko
- (Poland) Wiktor Zień

=== Standings ===
Pos	Team	Pld	W	OTW	OTL	L	GF	GA	GD	Pts	Promotion or relegation
1	Ukraine (H)	5	4	0	0	1	18	8	+10	12 (Note: Austria 3–5 Ukraine)	Promoted to the 2019 Division I A
2	Austria	5	4	0	0	1	20	7	+13	12	
3	Japan	5	2	2	0	1	12	11	+1	10	
4	Hungary	5	2	0	1	2	14	11	+3	7	
5	Italy	5	1	0	1	3	11	13	−2	4	
6	Romania	5	0	0	0	5	5	30	−25	0	Relegated to the 2019 Division II A

Source: IIHF
Rules for classification: 1) points; 2) head-to-head points; 3) head-to-head goal difference; 4) head-to-head number of goals scored; 5) result against closest best-ranked team outside tied teams; 6) result against second-best ranked team outside tied teams; 7) seeding before tournament.
(H) Host

=== Results ===
All times are local (UTC+3).

14 April 2018; 13:00	Ukraine	0–1 (0–0, 0–0, 0–1)	Japan	Palace of Sports, Kyiv; Attendance: 3,007

Game reference
Artur Ogandzhanyan	Goalies	Eiki Sato	Referee: (Latvia) Gints Zviedrītis; Linesmen: (Netherlands) Lodewyk Beelen (United Kingdom) James Kavanagh
0–1 / 42:23 – Abe (Ishida, Takebe) (PP)			Referee: (Latvia) Gints Zviedrītis; Linesmen: (Netherlands) Lodewyk Beelen (United Kingdom) James Kavanagh
6 min	Penalties	14 min	Referee: (Latvia) Gints Zviedrītis; Linesmen: (Netherlands) Lodewyk Beelen (United Kingdom) James Kavanagh
32	Shots	33	Referee: (Latvia) Gints Zviedrītis; Linesmen: (Netherlands) Lodewyk Beelen (United Kingdom) James Kavanagh

14 April 2018; 16:30	Italy	1–2 (1–2, 0–0, 0–0)	Austria	Palace of Sports, Kyiv; Attendance: 1,489

Game reference

Davide Fadani
Andrea Basraoui
Goalies
Alexander Schmidt
Referee:
(Norway) Christian Persson
Linesmen:
(Norway) Håvar Dahl
(Poland) Wiktor Zień

	0–1	05:48 – Lanzinger (Baumgartner) (SH)
Bitetto (Pisetta) – 16:29	1–1
	1–2	17:15 – Baumgartner (Lanzinger)

8 min
Penalties
8 min
19
Shots
37

14 April 2018; 20:00	Romania	0–5 (0–3, 0–1, 0–1)	Hungary	Palace of Sports, Kyiv; Attendance: 1,198

Game reference

Levente Ambrus
Arnold Demeter
Goalies
Lajos Gönczi
Referee:
(Switzerland) Joris Müller
Linesmen:
(United States) Riley Bowles
(Ukraine) Artem Korepanov

0–1	03:05 – Szécsi (Révész) (PP)
0–2	03:46 – Keresztes (Papp)
0–3	11:34 – Révész
0–4	39:14 – Révész
0–5	52:35 – Dézsi (Péter) (SH)

29 min
Penalties
8 min
14
Shots
45

15 April 2018; 13:00	Austria	3–5 (1–1, 2–1, 0–3)	Ukraine	Palace of Sports, Kyiv; Attendance: 3,104

Game reference

Alexander Schmidt
Goalies
Artur Ogandzhanyan
Referee:
(Switzerland) Joris Müller
Linesmen:
(Netherlands) Lodewyk Beelen
(United States) Riley Bowles

	0–1	09:20 – Danylenko (Khalin, Morozov) (PP)
Kandemir (Rossi, Kleiss) – 16:42	1–1
Lindner (Baumgartner) – 20:40	2–1
	2–2	21:51 – Krivoshapkin (Peresunko)
Rossi (Baumgartner) (PP) – 30:23	3–2
	3–3	56:02 – Morozov (Khalin, Babchuk)
	3–4	56:46 – Krivoshapkin (Kruhliakov)
	3–5	59:30 – Mateichenko (ENG)

8 min
Penalties
8 min
41
Shots
25

15 April 2018; 16:30	Japan	5–3 (1–1, 3–2, 1–0)	Romania	Palace of Sports, Kyiv; Attendance: 1,259

Game reference

Ryo Ishikawa
Eiki Sato
Goalies
Arnold Demeter
Referee:
(Czech Republic) Roman Mrkva
Linesmen:
(Ukraine) Artem Korepanov
(Ukraine) Anton Peretyatko

	0–1	07:06 – Cășăneanu (Gecse, Karda) (SH)
Momen (Araki, Karatsu) – 07:33	1–1
Abe (Gondaira, Miyata) – 23:06	2–1
	2–2	25:55 – Cășăneanu (Karda) (PP)
Yoneyama (Kimura) (PP) – 33:33	3–2
	3–3	37:20 – Cășăneanu (Filip)
Karatsu (Araki, Momen) – 38:22	4–3
Araki (Karatsu, Momen) – 49:14	5–3

4 min
Penalties
6 min
33
Shots
13

15 April 2018; 20:00	Hungary	4–0 (1–0, 1–0, 2–0)	Italy	Palace of Sports, Kyiv; Attendance: 1,047

Game reference

Lajos Gönczi
Goalies
Davide Fadani
Referee:
(Latvia) Gints Zviedrītis
Linesmen:
(United Kingdom) James Kavanagh
(Poland) Wiktor Zień

Keresztes (Papp) – 07:51	1–0
A. Kovács (M. Horváth, Almási) – 35:32	2–0
Péter (Keresztes, Révész) (PP) – 48:43	3–0
S. Kovács (L. Horváth) – 56:35	4–0

30 min
Penalties
12 min
28
Shots
14

17 April 2018; 13:00	Romania	1–7 (0–2, 0–2, 1–3)	Italy	Palace of Sports, Kyiv; Attendance: 549

Game reference

Arnold Demeter
Levente Ambrus
Goalies
Davide Fadani
Referee:
(Switzerland) Joris Müller
Linesmen:
(United States) Riley Bowles
(Ukraine) Artem Korepanov

	0–1	01:15 – Bitetto (Salvai)
	0–2	10:55 – Zecchetto (PS)
	0–3	29:06 – De Giacinto (Salvai) (PP)
	0–4	35:42 – Bitetto (Öhler, Grossrubatscher)
	0–5	41:29 – Tomasini (Bitetto, Salvai)
	0–6	46:32 – Pisetta (Cristellon, Taufer)
	0–7	48:06 – Damin (Zecchetto, Öhler)
Sándor-Székely (Cășăneanu) – 55:49	1–7

16 min
Penalties
2 min
11
Shots
41

17 April 2018; 16:30	Austria	4–0 (2–0, 1–0, 1–0)	Japan	Palace of Sports, Kyiv; Attendance: 1,571

Game reference

Marvin Kortin
Goalies
Eiki Sato
Referee:
(Norway) Christian Persson
Linesmen:
(United Kingdom) James Kavanagh
(Poland) Wiktor Zień

Thaler (Piff) – 05:01	1–0
Rossi (Maier, Nickl) (PP) – 08:31	2–0
Lanzinger (Kleiss, Baumgartner) (PP) – 28:20	3–0
Rebernig (Lindner, Huber) – 41:46	4–0

0 min
Penalties
12 min
35
Shots
15

17 April 2018; 20:00	Hungary	3–4 (1–1, 0–2, 2–1)	Ukraine	Palace of Sports, Kyiv; Attendance: 4,537

Game reference

Lajos Gönczi
Goalies
Artur Ogandzhanyan
Vladislav Hurko
Referee:
(Czech Republic) Roman Mrkva
Linesmen:
(Netherlands) Lodewyk Beelen
(Norway) Håvar Dahl

	0–1	09:53 – Morozov (Danylenko, Serednitsky)
Révész – 12:58	1–1
	1–2	31:11 – Morozov (Danylenko, Serednitsky)
	1–3	32:12 – Kruhliakov (Lohach, Danylenko) (PP)
	1–4	43:29 – Danylenko (Morozov)
Keresztes (Péter, Révész) (PP) – 52:24	2–4
Almási (A. Kovács) – 56:08	3–4

10 min
Penalties
12 min
28
Shots
30

18 April 2018; 13:00	Austria	7–1 (4–0, 1–1, 2–0)	Romania	Palace of Sports, Kyiv; Attendance: 954

Game reference

Marvin Kortin
Goalies
Levente Ambrus
Arnold Demeter
Referee:
(Czech Republic) Roman Mrkva
Linesmen:
(United Kingdom) James Kavanagh
(Ukraine) Artem Korepanov

Kandemir (Zündel, Maier) – 04:57	1–0
Rebernig (Steffler, Huber) – 05:31	2–0
Baumgartner (Payr, Lanzinger) (PP2) – 11:37	3–0
Maier (Rossi, Wohlfahrt) (PP) – 15:17	4–0
	4–1	26:01 – Petrică
Lanzinger (Baumgartner, Maier) – 28:24	5–1
Rebernig (Lindner, Huber) – 42:08	6–1
Wohlfahrt (Zündel, Rossi) – 53:52	7–1

6 min
Penalties
12 min
60
Shots
13

18 April 2018; 16:30	Japan	3–2 GWS (1–0, 1–0, 0–2); OT: (0–0); SO: (1–0)	Hungary	Palace of Sports, Kyiv; Attendance: 1,398

Game reference

Eiki Sato
Goalies
Lajos Gönczi
Referee:
(Latvia) Gints Zviedrītis
Linesmen:
(Netherlands) Lodewyk Beelen
(United States) Riley Bowles

Hanzawa (Maruyama, Takeya) – 01:44	1–0
Abe (Takebe, Miyata) (PP) – 27:22	2–0
	2–1	42:42 – S. Kovács (A. Kovács, Kozma) (EA)
	2–2	59:04 – Papp (Péter, Keresztes) (EA)

Hanzawa
Abe
Gondaira (miss)
Momen (miss)
Shootout
Almási
(miss) Dézsi
(miss) Szécsi
(miss) Keresztes
(miss) Révész
14 min
Penalties
16 min
24
Shots
38

18 April 2018; 20:00	Italy	1–3 (0–0, 1–2, 0–1)	Ukraine	Palace of Sports, Kyiv; Attendance: 4,827

Game reference

Davide Fadani
Goalies
Vladislav Hurko
Referee:
(Norway) Christian Persson
Linesmen:
(Norway) Håvar Dahl
(Poland) Wiktor Zień

Salvai (Bitetto) – 28:24	1–0
	1–1	32:27 – Kruhliakov (Peresunko, Mateichenko) (PP)
	1–2	33:24 – Babchuk (Serednitsky, Danylenko) (PP)
	1–3	51:20 – Peresunko

29 min
Penalties
4 min
18
Shots
28

20 April 2018; 13:00	Japan	3–2 OT (1–1, 0–0, 1–1); OT: (1–0)	Italy	Palace of Sports, Kyiv; Attendance: 1,073

Game reference

Eiki Sato
Goalies
Andrea Basraoui
Referee:
(Czech Republic) Roman Mrkva
Linesmen:
(Netherlands) Lodewyk Beelen
(United Kingdom) James Kavanagh

	0–1	09:20 – Luisetti (De Nardin, Zecchetto) (PP)
Araki (Takebe, Abe) – 10:14	1–1
Abe (Araki) – 51:00	2–1
	2–2	56:10 – Deluca (SH)
Takebe (Abe) (PP) – 61:48	3–2

26 min
Penalties
20 min
43
Shots
18

20 April 2018; 16:30	Hungary	0–4 (0–1, 0–1, 0–2)	Austria	Palace of Sports, Kyiv; Attendance: 2,150

Game reference

Dominik Horváth
Goalies
Marvin Kortin
Referee:
(Switzerland) Joris Müller
Linesmen:
(Ukraine) Artem Korepanov
(Poland) Wiktor Zień

0–1	13:44 – Rossi (Wohlfahrt, Maier)
0–2	27:58 – Baumgartner (Thaler, Sivec)
0–3	47:57 – Judth (Kleiss, Ploner)
0–4	53:31 – Rossi (Kandemir, Lanzinger)

22 min
Penalties
8 min
15
Shots
45

20 April 2018; 20:00	Ukraine	6–0 (2–0, 2–0, 2–0)	Romania	Palace of Sports, Kyiv; Attendance: 5,000

Game reference

Vladislav Hurko
Goalies
Arnold Demeter
Referee:
(Norway) Christian Persson
Linesmen:
(United States) Riley Bowles
(Norway) Håvar Dahl

Lanin (Duiun, Tselogorodtsev) – 09:20	1–0
Peresunko (Syrotenko) – 11:20	2–0
Syrotenko (Serednitsky, Morozov) – 29:19	3–0
Mateichenko (Peresunko, Syrotenko) – 35:09	4–0
Danylenko (Vasylyev) – 42:02	5–0
Morozov (Danylenko) (PP) – 55:41	6–0

2 min
Penalties
8 min
39
Shots
11

=== Statistics ===
==== Scoring leaders ====
List shows the top ten skaters sorted by points, then goals.

Player	GP	G	A	Pts	+/−	PIM	POS
(Austria) Benjamin Baumgartner	5	3	5	8	+3	0	F
(Ukraine) Dmytro Danylenko	5	3	5	8	+4	2	F
(Japan) Taiga Abe	5	5	2	7	−2	4	F
(Ukraine) Felix Morozov	5	4	3	7	+4	2	F
(Austria) Marco Rossi	5	4	3	7	+2	4	F
(Austria) Benjamin Lanzinger	5	3	3	6	+4	2	F
(Hungary) Marcell Révész	5	3	3	6	+5	14	F
(Italy) Enrico Bitetto	5	3	2	5	+1	2	F
(Hungary) Levente Keresztes	5	3	2	5	+3	2	F
(Japan) Shogo Araki	5	2	3	5	+5	0	F
(Ukraine) Oleksandr Peresunko	5	2	3	5	+5	4	F

GP = Games played; G = Goals; A = Assists; Pts = Points; +/− = P Plus–minus; PIM = Penalties in minutes; POS = Position
Source: IIHF.com

==== Leading goaltenders ====
Only the top five goaltenders, based on save percentage, who have played 40% of their team's minutes are included in this list.

Player	TOI	SA	GA	GAA	Sv%	SO
(Austria) Marvin Kortin	180:00	43	1	0.33	97.67	2
(Ukraine) Artur Ogandzhanyan	167:22	88	5	1.79	94.32	0
(Japan) Eiki Sato	266:48	126	8	1.80	93.65	1
(Ukraine) Vladislav Hurko	132:15	43	3	1.36	93.02	1
(Hungary) Lajos Gönczi	241:49	82	7	1.74	91.46	2

TOI = Time on ice (minutes:seconds); SA = Shots against; GA = Goals against; GAA = Goals against average; Sv% = Save percentage; SO = Shutouts
Source: IIHF.com

=== Awards ===
Best Players Selected by the Directorate

- Goaltender: (Japan) Eiki Sato
- Defenceman: (Austria) David Maier
- Forward: (Ukraine) Oleksandr Peresunko

Source: IIHF.com
