= Marco Rossi (ice hockey) =

Austrian ice hockey player (born 2001)

- Born: 23 September 2001 (age 25) Feldkirch, Austria
- Height: 5 ft 9 in (175 cm)
- Weight: 182 lb (83 kg; 13 st 0 lb)
- Position: Centre
- Shoots: Left
- NHL team Former teams: Vancouver Canucks; ZSC Lions; Minnesota Wild
- National team: Austria
- NHL draft: 9th overall, 2020; Minnesota Wild
- Playing career: 2018–present

Marco Rossi (born 23 September 2001) is an Austrian professional ice hockey player who is a centre for the Vancouver Canucks of the National Hockey League (NHL).

Rossi grew up in Austria and moved to Switzerland in 2011 to further his career. He spent several years there, making his professional debut in 2018 with the GCK Lions of the Swiss League, the second-highest league in Switzerland. In 2018, he moved to North America and spent two seasons with the Ottawa 67's of the junior Ontario Hockey League (OHL). He led the OHL in scoring and was named the most valuable player of the league in 2019–20. Regarded as a top prospect for the 2020 NHL entry draft, Rossi was selected ninth overall by the Minnesota Wild, made his NHL debut in 2022 and was traded to the Canucks in 2025. Internationally, Rossi has played for Austria in various tournaments.

== Playing career ==
Rossi first played ice hockey in his native Austria when he was 3 years old. At the age of 10, Rossi moved to Switzerland to further his career, and Feldkirch, his hometown, is close to the Austria–Switzerland border. At the age of 13 Rossi moved to Zürich again to help his career, with him and his father commuting two hours each way in order to allow Marco to stay at home and continue his education. He played in the junior system of Switzerland within the system of the ZSC Lions, frequently playing in older age categories. He made his professional debut in the 2017–18 season, playing 18 games and recording seven points for the GCK Lions of the Swiss League, the second-highest league in Switzerland. After the season he was selected 18th overall by the Ottawa 67's of the Ontario Hockey League (OHL) in the CHL Import Draft. He played 53 games with Ottawa in 2018–19 and scored 65 points, finishing fourth on the team in scoring, and had an additional 22 points in 17 playoff games. Rossi was named to the OHL Second All-Star Team as a result. Rossi returned to Ottawa for the 2019–20 season and led the OHL, and the entire CHL in scoring with 120 points in 56 games. He was awarded the Eddie Powers Memorial Trophy and CHL Top Scorer Award for leading the OHL and CHL in scoring, respectively, and was named the most outstanding player in the OHL, winning the Red Tilson Trophy, and was also named to the OHL's First All-Star Team. He was the first European player to lead the OHL in scoring (Stan Mikita, who was born in Slovakia and raised in Canada, did so in the 1958–59 season).

Heading into the 2020 NHL entry draft, Rossi was regarded as a top prospect, and the NHL Central Scouting Bureau had him ranked as the sixth-best North American-based skater for the draft. He was selected in the first-round, ninth overall, by the Minnesota Wild. On 23 October 2020, Rossi was signed by the Wild to a three-year, entry-level contract. Five days later, he was loaned to the ZSC Lions until the start of NHL training camp. He held a Swiss player-licence after having played most of his junior career in Switzerland, but only played one game for ZSC Lions. The NHL delayed the start of the 2020–21 season until January 2021, and Rossi was invited to join the Wild's training camp prior to the season starting. However, he returned to Austria due to long-term complications from COVID-19; he had tested positive late in 2020 for the virus. Speaking about his battle with the virus, Rossi stated: "I'm thankful to God that he supported me. ... I'm just happy that I'm still alive."

=== Minnesota Wild ===
Rossi started the 2021–22 season with Minnesota's minor league affiliate, the Iowa Wild of the American Hockey League (AHL). After playing 21 games in the AHL, where he scored 23 points, Rossi was recalled to Minnesota in January 2022, and made his NHL debut on 6 January 2022, against the Boston Bruins. He played two games in the NHL before returning to Iowa.

On 22 August 2025, Rossi, a restricted free agent, signed a three-year contract with the Wild.

=== Vancouver Canucks ===
On 12 December 2025, Rossi was traded to the Vancouver Canucks along with Liam Öhgren, Zeev Buium, and a 2026 first-round draft pick, in exchange for Quinn Hughes.

== International play ==
The first International Ice Hockey Federation (IIHF) tournament Rossi played at was the 2017 World U18 Championship Division IB, the third tier of the tournament. He recorded eight points in five games, leading the Austria under-18 team in scoring and playing third overall. Rossi subsequently played at the 2018 World Junior Championship IA, the second tier at that level. With five points in five games, he led the Austria junior team and finished tied for fifth overall. He returned to the under-18 level for the 2018 Division IB tournament, recording seven points in five games to place second for Austria and tied for fourth overall.

Rossi served as Austria's captain during the 2021 World Junior Championships. He went scoreless in four games, as Austria only scored one goal, losing all four games.

== Personal life ==
Rossi is the youngest of three children of Michael and Claudia Rossi; he has two sisters, Estelle and Marielle. His father, Michael, played ice hockey for 20 years, mainly with VEU Feldkirch.

Rossi is a devout Christian; he and his girlfriend pray together before every game, and he does not drink alcohol.

Rossi is a fan of Red Bull Racing in Formula One.

== Career statistics ==
=== Regular season and playoffs ===
| | | | Regular season | | | | | Playoffs |
| Season | Team | League | GP | G | A | Pts | PIM | GP | G | A | Pts | PIM |
|---|---|---|---|---|---|---|---|---|---|---|---|---|
| 2016–17 | ZSC U17 | U17-Elit | 29 | 28 | 23 | 51 | 12 | 11 | 8 | 3 | 11 | 6 |
| 2016–17 | GCK Lions U20 | U20-Elit | 9 | 3 | 4 | 7 | 6 | — | — | — | — | — |
| 2017–18 | GCK Lions U20 | U20-Elit | 34 | 22 | 29 | 51 | 30 | 9 | 5 | 5 | 10 | 8 |
| 2017–18 | GCK Lions | SL | 18 | 4 | 3 | 7 | 6 | — | — | — | — | — |
| 2018–19 | Ottawa 67's | OHL | 53 | 29 | 36 | 65 | 32 | 17 | 6 | 16 | 22 | 18 |
| 2019–20 | Ottawa 67s | OHL | 56 | 39 | 81 | 120 | 40 | — | — | — | — | — |
| 2020–21 | ZSC Lions | NL | 1 | 0 | 1 | 1 | 0 | — | — | — | — | — |
| 2021–22 | Iowa Wild | AHL | 63 | 18 | 35 | 53 | 46 | — | — | — | — | — |
| 2021–22 | Minnesota Wild | NHL | 2 | 0 | 0 | 0 | 4 | — | — | — | — | — |
| 2022–23 | Minnesota Wild | NHL | 19 | 0 | 1 | 1 | 8 | — | — | — | — | — |
| 2022–23 | Iowa Wild | AHL | 53 | 16 | 35 | 51 | 46 | 2 | 1 | 1 | 2 | 2 |
| 2023–24 | Minnesota Wild | NHL | 82 | 21 | 19 | 40 | 47 | — | — | — | — | — |
| 2024–25 | Minnesota Wild | NHL | 82 | 24 | 36 | 60 | 26 | 6 | 2 | 1 | 3 | 6 |
| 2025–26 | Minnesota Wild | NHL | 17 | 4 | 9 | 13 | 2 | — | — | — | — | — |
| 2025–26 | Vancouver Canucks | NHL | 33 | 8 | 14 | 22 | 8 | — | — | — | — | — |
| NHL totals | | | 235 | 57 | 79 | 136 | 95 | 6 | 2 | 1 | 3 | 6 |

=== International ===
| Year | Team | Event | Result | GP | G | A | Pts | PIM |
|---|---|---|---|---|---|---|---|---|
| 2017 | Austria | U18-IB | 2nd | 5 | 6 | 2 | 8 | 4 |
| 2018 | Austria | U18-IB | 2nd | 5 | 4 | 3 | 7 | 4 |
| 2018 | Austria | WJC-IA | 5th | 5 | 3 | 2 | 5 | 8 |
| 2021 | Austria | WJC | 10th | 4 | 0 | 0 | 0 | 2 |
| 2023 | Austria | WC | 14th | 7 | 1 | 5 | 6 | 6 |
| 2024 | Austria | WC | 10th | 7 | 1 | 5 | 6 | 8 |
| Junior totals | | | | 19 | 13 | 7 | 20 | 18 |
| Senior totals | | | | 14 | 2 | 10 | 12 | 14 |

== Awards and honours ==
| Award | Year | Ref |
OHL
| Eddie Powers Memorial Trophy | 2019–20 | |
| Red Tilson Trophy | 2019–20 | |
| First All-Star Team | 2019–20 | |
| Second All-Star Team | 2018–19 | |
| CHL Top Scorer Award | 2019–20 | |
NHL
| NHL All-Rookie Team | 2024 | |

Awards and achievements
| Preceded by Matthew Boldy | Minnesota Wild first-round draft pick 2020 | Succeeded by Jesper Wallstedt |
