= Ilya Solovyov =

Belarusian ice hockey player (born 2000)

- Born: 20 July 2000 (age 26) Mogilev, Belarus
- Height: 6 ft 3 in (191 cm)
- Weight: 208 lb (94 kg; 14 st 12 lb)
- Position: Defence
- Shoots: Left
- NHL team Former teams: Pittsburgh Penguins; Dinamo Minsk; Calgary Flames; Colorado Avalanche
- National team: Belarus
- NHL draft: 205th overall, 2020; Calgary Flames
- Playing career: 2017–present

Ilya Ivanovich Solovyov (Russian: Илья Иванович Соловьёв; born 20 July 2000) is a Belarusian professional ice hockey player who is a defenceman for the Pittsburgh Penguins of the National Hockey League (NHL). Internationally, he played for Belarus at the 2021 World Championship.

== Playing career ==
Solovyov played as a youth in Belarus, developing within the Belarus under-20 team while participating in the Belarusian Extraliga (BXL). He was selected 53rd overall in the 2019 CHL Import Draft by the Saginaw Spirit of the Ontario Hockey League (OHL) and made his North American major junior debut in the following 2019–20 season, where he scored seven goals and had 33 assists for 40 points in 53 games.

He was drafted in the seventh round, 205th overall, in the 2020 NHL entry draft by the Calgary Flames and returned to Belarus to play with Dinamo Minsk of the Kontinental Hockey League (KHL). As a rookie in the 2020–21 season, Solovyov recorded two goals and seven assists for nine points and 36 penalty minutes in 41 games.

Solovyov was signed to a three-year, entry-level contract with the Calgary Flames on 6 April 2021. Solovyov earned his first NHL point after Connor Zary deflected Solovyov's shot from the point and scored during a 5 December 2023 game against the Minnesota Wild.

Before the start of the 2024–25 NHL season, Solovyov re-signed with the Flames as a restricted free agent on a two-year contract on 18 September 2024. He played the majority of the season in the American Hockey League (AHL) with the Calgary Wranglers and registered six goals and 28 points through 59 appearances, sharing the team lead in goals among blueliners. Solovyov also made five appearances with the Flames, posting one assist.

Approaching the 2025–26 season, on 2 October 2025, Solovyov was placed on waivers by the Flames, and was claimed by the Colorado Avalanche the following day. Solovyov scored his first NHL goal during a 10 January 2026 game against the Columbus Blue Jackets. He was traded to the Pittsburgh Penguins on 20 January 2026, in exchange for Valtteri Puustinen and a 2026 seventh-round draft pick.

== International play ==
Solovyov represented Belarus at the 2021 World Championship.

== Personal life ==
Solovyov married his wife, Vlada, in May 2021. Their son was born in July 2024.

== Career statistics ==
=== Regular season and playoffs ===
			Regular season					Playoffs
Season	Team	League	GP	G	A	Pts	PIM	GP	G	A	Pts	PIM
2016–17	Belarus U20	BLR	1	0	0	0	0	—	—	—	—	—
2018–19	Belarus U20	BLR	53	3	5	8	30	4	0	0	0	2
2019–20	Saginaw Spirit	OHL	53	7	33	40	35	—	—	—	—	—
2020–21	Dinamo Minsk	KHL	41	2	7	9	36	5	0	1	1	0
2020–21	Dinamo-Molodechno	BLR	1	1	0	1	0	1	0	0	0	0
2021–22	Stockton Heat	AHL	51	3	5	8	24	6	0	1	1	0
2022–23	Calgary Wranglers	AHL	68	4	14	18	38	9	1	1	2	2
2023–24	Calgary Wranglers	AHL	51	5	10	15	34	6	1	0	1	2
2023–24	Calgary Flames	NHL	10	0	3	3	4	—	—	—	—	—
2024–25	Calgary Wranglers	AHL	59	6	22	28	34	1	0	0	0	0
2024–25	Calgary Flames	NHL	5	0	1	1	2	—	—	—	—	—
2025–26	Colorado Avalanche	NHL	16	1	2	3	6	—	—	—	—	—
2025–26	Colorado Eagles	AHL	3	0	0	0	0	—	—	—	—	—
2025–26	Pittsburgh Penguins	NHL	14	0	5	5	10	3	0	0	0	0
KHL totals			41	2	7	9	36	5	0	1	1	0
NHL totals			45	1	11	12	22	3	0	0	0	0

=== International ===
Year	Team	Event	GP	G	A	Pts	PIM
2018	Belarus	U18	5	0	0	0	2
2019	Belarus	WJC-D1	5	0	0	0	0
2019	Belarus	WC-D1	5	0	0	0	0
2020	Belarus	WJC-D1	5	1	2	3	2
2021	Belarus	WC	4	0	0	0	2
2021	Belarus	OGQ	3	0	0	0	0
Junior totals			15	1	2	3	4
Senior totals			12	0	0	0	2
