= Aliaksei Protas =

Belarusian ice hockey player (born 2001)

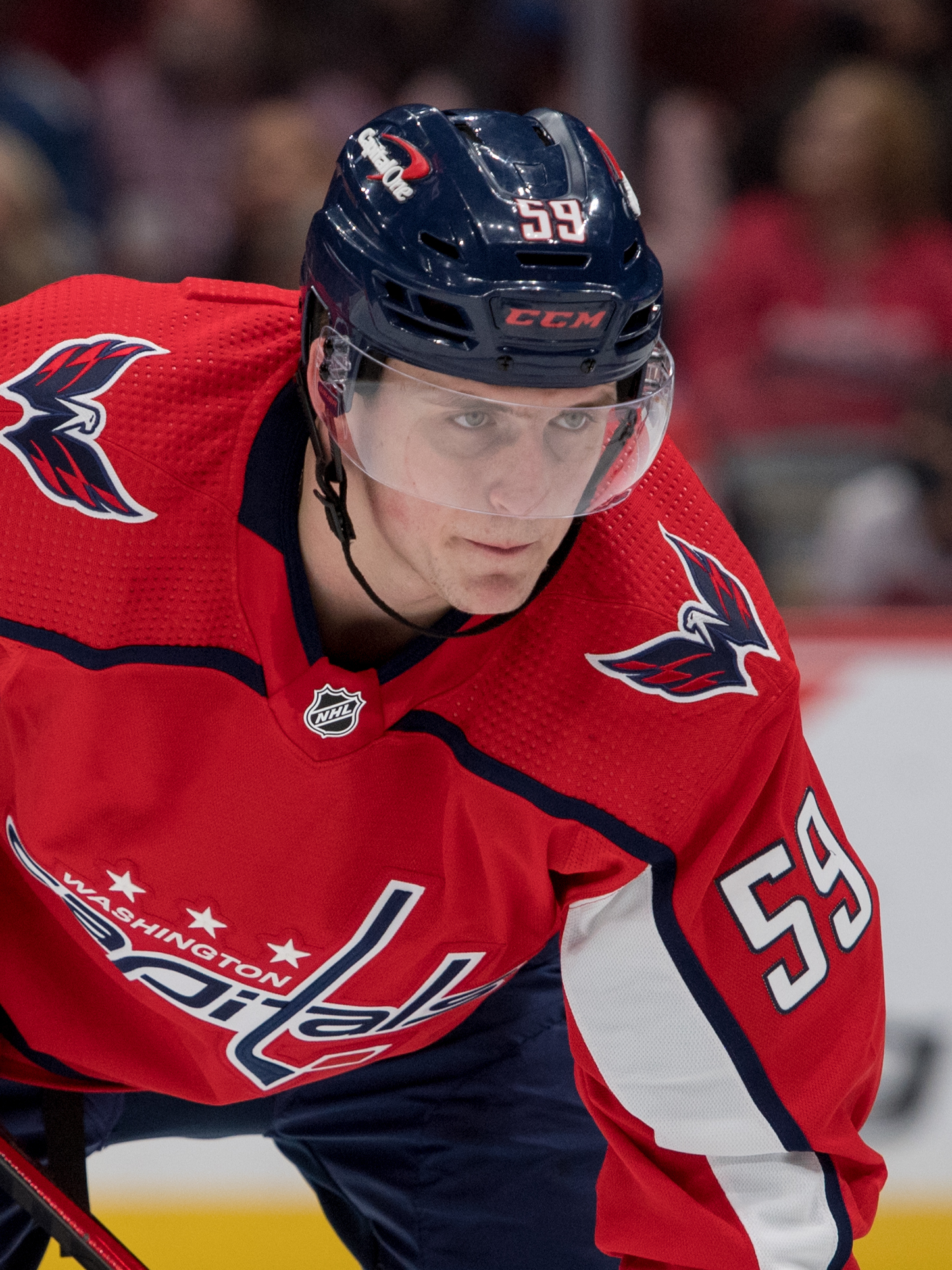
- Protas playing for the Washington Capitals in December 2021
- Born: 6 January 2001 (age 25) Vitebsk, Belarus
- Height: 6 ft 6 in (198 cm)
- Weight: 250 lb (113 kg; 17 st 12 lb)
- Position: Forward
- Shoots: Left
- NHL team Former teams: Washington Capitals; Dinamo Minsk
- National team: Belarus
- NHL draft: 91st overall, 2019; Washington Capitals
- Playing career: 2020–present

Aliaksei Uladzimiravich Protas (Belarusian: Аляксей Уладзіміравіч Протас, Russian: Алексей Владимирович Протас; born 6 January 2001) is a Belarusian professional ice hockey player who is a forward for the Washington Capitals of the National Hockey League (NHL). Protas previously played two seasons of major junior for the Prince Albert Raiders of the Western Hockey League (WHL), and was selected 91st overall by the Washington Capitals in the 2019 NHL entry draft. He made his professional debut in 2020 with Dinamo Minsk of the Kontinental Hockey League (KHL). Internationally, Protas has played for the Belarusian national junior team at two World Junior Championships.

== Playing career ==
Protas started his career in his hometown of Vitebsk. He moved to Denver, Colorado to play youth hockey for Colorado Evolution for one season before travelling back to Belarus. He spent two seasons with the Belarus U17 team that played in the Vysshaya Liga, the second league in Belarus, before being selected 26th overall by the Prince Albert Raiders in the 2018 CHL Import Draft. He joined the Raiders for the 2018–19 season, and finished with 40 points in 61 games. Heading into the 2019 NHL entry draft Protas was the 30th ranked North American skater, and was selected 91st overall by the Washington Capitals. He played for Prince Albert in 2019–20 season, which was ended prematurely due to COVID-19; in 58 games he had 80 points, which placed him ninth in the WHL in scoring and the highest-scoring European player.

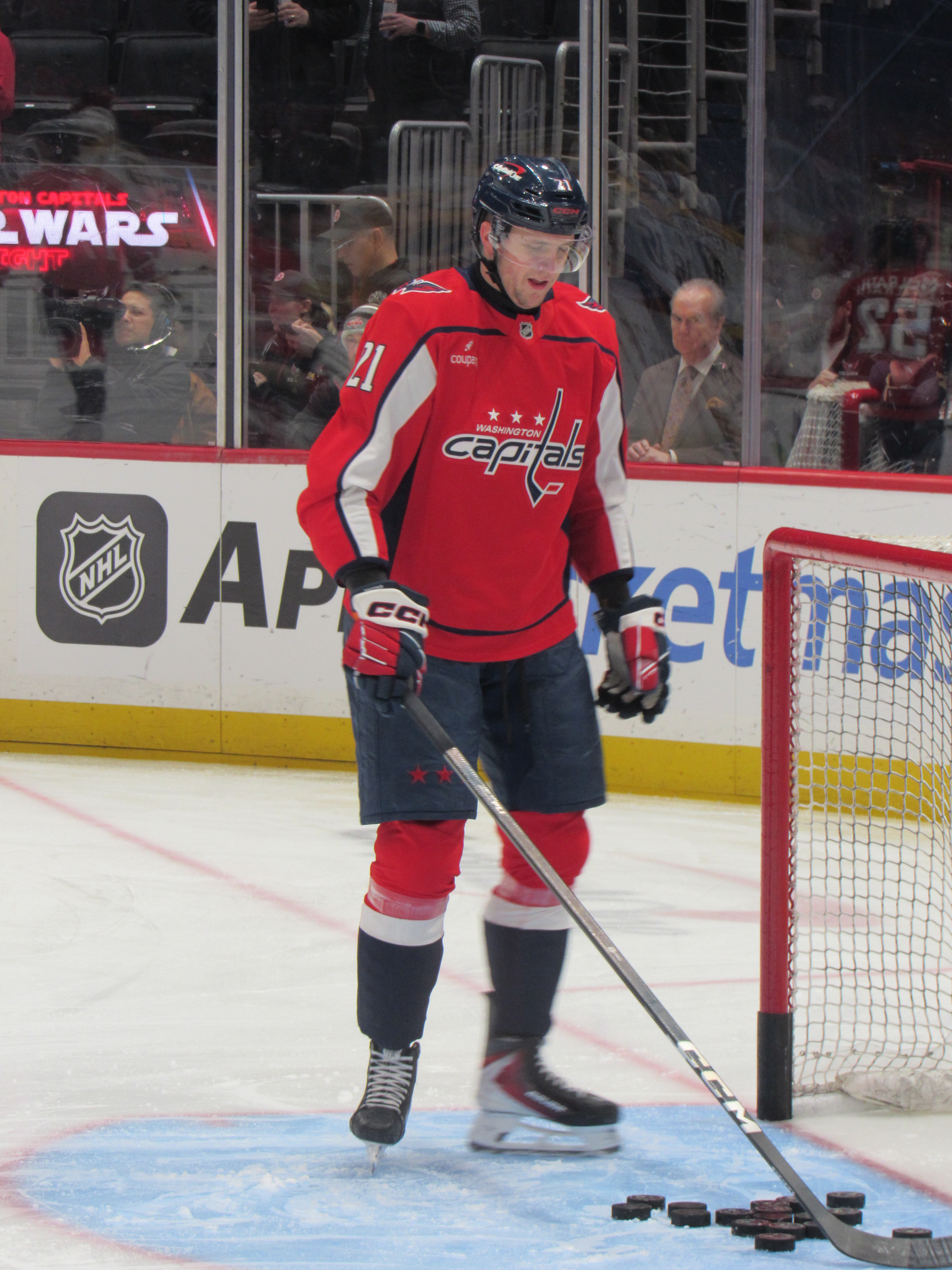
Protas in 2026

For the 2020–21 season, Protas was loaned to HC Dinamo Minsk of the Kontinental Hockey League (KHL). He had 18 points in 58 games, and an additional 4 points in 5 playoff games. With Minsk's season over, Protas was reassigned to the Hershey Bears, the Capitals' American Hockey League affiliate.

During the 2021–22 NHL season, Protas was called up to the Capitals, and he scored his first career NHL goal on 28 November 2021, during a 4–2 victory over the Carolina Hurricanes.

On 19 January 2024, Protas signed a five-year contract extension with the Capitals, carrying an average annual value of $3.375 million through the 2028–29 season.

On 11 March 2025, Protas recorded his first career hat-trick in a 7–4 win over the Anaheim Ducks.

During the 2024–25 season, Protas set career highs in goals (30), assists (36), and total points (66).

== Personal life ==
Protas' younger brother, Ilya, was drafted by the Capitals in the third round of the 2024 NHL entry draft.

Protas and his wife, Tanya, have two daughters, Alisa (born 2023) and Viktoria (born 2026).

== Career statistics ==
=== Regular season and playoffs ===
			Regular season					Playoffs
Season	Team	League	GP	G	A	Pts	PIM	GP	G	A	Pts	PIM
2016–17	Team Belarus U17	BEL-2	4	0	1	1	0	—	—	—	—	—
2017–18	Team Belarus U17	BEL-2	49	9	11	20	8	3	1	3	4	0
2018–19	Prince Albert Raiders	WHL	61	11	29	40	4	23	12	10	22	6
2019–20	Prince Albert Raiders	WHL	58	31	49	80	8	—	—	—	—	—
2020–21	Dinamo Minsk	KHL	58	10	8	18	4	5	1	3	4	4
2020–21	Hershey Bears	AHL	16	2	5	7	2	—	—	—	—	—
2021–22	Hershey Bears	AHL	42	8	16	24	10	3	0	1	1	0
2021–22	Washington Capitals	NHL	33	3	6	9	0	—	—	—	—	—
2022–23	Washington Capitals	NHL	58	4	11	15	12	—	—	—	—	—
2022–23	Hershey Bears	AHL	9	2	3	5	0	20	5	8	13	2
2023–24	Washington Capitals	NHL	78	6	23	29	8	4	0	2	2	0
2024–25	Washington Capitals	NHL	76	30	36	66	18	6	1	1	2	0
2025–26	Washington Capitals	NHL	76	25	27	52	20	—	—	—	—	—
KHL totals			58	10	8	18	4	5	1	3	4	4
NHL totals			321	68	103	171	58	10	1	3	4	0

=== International ===
Year	Team	Event	Result	GP	G	A	Pts	PIM
2018	Belarus	U18	8th	5	1	3	4	0
2019	Belarus	WJC-D1	12th	5	2	3	5	0
2020	Belarus	WJC-D1	13th	5	4	3	7	6
2021	Belarus	WC	15th	6	0	2	2	0
2022	Belarus	OGQ	DNQ	3	0	1	1	2
Junior totals				15	7	9	16	6
Senior totals				9	0	3	3	2

== Awards and honours ==
Honour	Year
WHL
Ed Chynoweth Cup	2019
First All-Star Team (East)	2020
Belarus
2021 Belarus Cup – Champion	2021
AHL
Calder Cup	2023
