= 2020 World Junior Ice Hockey Championships – Division I =

International ice hockey tournament

2020 IIHF U20 World Championship Division I
Tournament details
- Host countries: Belarus; Ukraine
- Venue(s): 2 (in 2 host cities)
- Dates: 9–15 December 2019; 12–18 December 2019
- Teams: 12

The 2020 World Junior Ice Hockey Championship Division I consisted of two tiered groups of six teams each: the second-tier Division I A and the third-tier Division I B. For each tier's tournament, the first-placed team was promoted to a higher division, while the last-placed team was relegated to a lower division.

To be eligible as a junior player in these tournaments, a player couldn't be born earlier than 2000.

== Division I A ==
2020 IIHF U20 World Championship Division I A

Tournament details
- Host country: Belarus
- City: Minsk
- Venue(s): 1 (in 1 host city)
- Dates: 9–15 December 2019
- Teams: 6

Tournament statistics
- Games played: 15
- Goals scored: 79 (5.27 per game)
- Attendance: 47,412 (3,161 per game)
- Scoring leader(s): (Austria) Benjamin Baumgartner (11 points)

Official website
- www.iihf.com

The Division I A tournament was played in Minsk, Belarus, from 9 to 15 December 2019.

=== Participating teams ===
Team	Qualification
Denmark	placed 10th in Top Division last year and were relegated
Belarus	hosts; placed 2nd in Division I A last year
Norway	placed 3rd in Division I A last year
Latvia	placed 4th in Division I A last year
Austria	placed 5th in Division I A last year
Slovenia	placed 1st in Division I B last year and were promoted

=== Match officials ===
Four referees and 7 linesmen were selected for the tournament.

Referees

- (Poland) Michał Baca
- (Italy) Andrea Moschen
- (Spain) Alexey Roshchyn
- (Norway) Marcus Wannerstedt

Linesmen

- (Belarus) Pavel Badyl
- (Italy) Nicola Basso
- (France) Thomas Caillot
- (Switzerland) Dario Fuchs
- (Slovakia) Lukáš Kacej
- (Belarus) Mikita Paliakou
- (Estonia) Toivo Tilku

=== Final standings ===
Division I A Venue
Minsk
Čyžoŭka-Arena
Capacity: 8,807
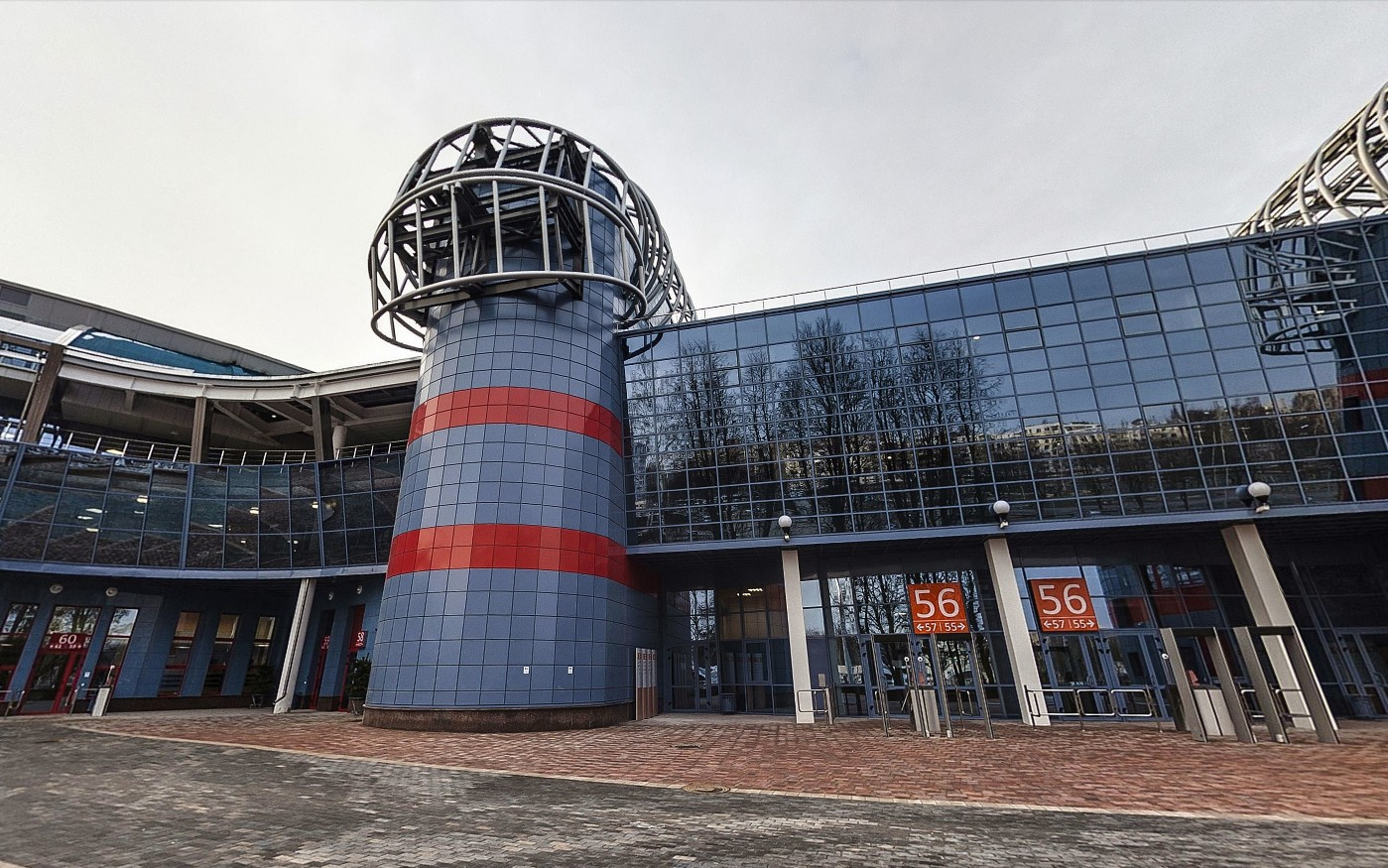

Pos	Team	Pld	W	OTW	OTL	L	GF	GA	GD	Pts	Promotion or relegation
1	Austria	5	4	0	0	1	18	10	+8	12	Promoted to the 2021 Top Division
2	Latvia	5	3	1	0	1	18	5	+13	11 (Note: Latvia 3–2 (OT) Belarus)	
3	Belarus (H)	5	3	0	2	0	19	12	+7	11	
4	Norway	5	1	2	0	2	12	11	+1	7	
5	Denmark	5	0	1	1	3	6	16	−10	3	
6	Slovenia	5	0	0	1	4	6	25	−19	1	Relegated to the 2022 Division I B

Source: IIHF
Rules for classification: 1) points; 2) head-to-head points; 3) head-to-head goal difference; 4) head-to-head number of goals scored; 5) result against closest best-ranked team outside tied teams; 6) result against second-best-ranked team outside tied teams; 7) seeding before tournament.
(H) Host

=== Match results ===
All times are local (Moscow time – UTC+3).

9 December 2019; 12:30	Norway	6–2 (1–0, 5–2, 0–0)	Slovenia	Čyžoŭka-Arena, Minsk; Attendance: 1,512

Game reference

Tobias Breivold
Goalies
Žiga Kogovšek
Referee:
(Italy) Andrea Moschen
Linesmen:
(Belarus) Pavel Badyl
(France) Thomas Caillot

Rødne (Finstad, Hafsmoe) – 04:30	1–0
Finstad (Mikkelsen, Rødne) – 21:10	2–0
Frøberg (Hansen, Granath) – 23:10	3–0
	3–1	32:00 – Markun (Jakupović, Sojer)
Finstad (Rødne, Thomassen) – 33:38	4–1
Hermansson (Thomassen, Løkkeberg) – 38:22	5–1
	5–2	37:06 – Tőrők (Poklukar, Vodlan)
Halmrast (Lilleberg, Strandborg) – 39:35	6–2

2 min
Penalties
4 min
29
Shots
11

9 December 2019; 16:00	Denmark	0–3 (0–1, 0–1, 0–1)	Latvia	Čyžoŭka-Arena, Minsk; Attendance: 1,341

Game reference

Mads Søgaard
Goalies
Jānis Voris
Referee:
(Poland) Michał Baca
Linesmen:
(Switzerland) Dario Fuchs
(Belarus) Mikita Paliakou

0–1	12:01 – Prohorenkovs (Zabusovs, Jevdokimovs)
0–2	31:54 – Bucenieks (Fjodorovs, Švanenbergs)
0–3	54:29 – Bucenieks (Grīnbergs, Švanenbergs)

10 min
Penalties
6 min
19
Shots
35

9 December 2019; 19:30	Belarus	4–3 (2–3, 1–0, 1–0)	Austria	Čyžoŭka-Arena, Minsk; Attendance: 5,546

Game reference

Nikita Tolopilo
Goalies
Alexander Schmidt
Referee:
(Norway) Marcus Wannerstedt
Linesmen:
(Italy) Nicola Basso
(Slovakia) Lukáš Kacej

	0–1	04:55 – Ploner (Antal)
Pinchuk (Kolyachonok (Alistrov) (PP) – 06:42	1–1
	1–2	09:29 – Baumgartner (Lindner, Maier)
Usov (Demchenko, Oxentyuk) (PP) – 17:59	2–2
	2–3	18:41 – Huber (Baumgartner, Peeters)
Pavlenko (Azhgirei, Pyshkailo) – 30:29	3–3
Protas (Pinchuk) – 41:29	4–3

20 min
Penalties
24 min
41
Shots
22

10 December 2019; 12:30	Slovenia	1–2 OT (1–0, 0–1, 0–0) (OT: 0–1)	Denmark	Čyžoŭka-Arena, Minsk; Attendance: 1,348

Game reference

Val Usnik
Goalies
Frederik Dichow
Referee:
(Spain) Alexey Roshchyn
Linesmen:
(Belarus) Mikita Paliakou
(Estonia) Toivo Tilku

Tőrők (Predan, Razingar) (PP) – 07:00	1–0
	1–1	27:49 – Almquist (Schultz) (PP2)
	1–2	61:08 – Almquist (Larsen, Schultz)

22 min
Penalties
4 min
14
Shots
42

10 December 2019; 16:30	Austria	5–2 (1–2, 0–0, 4–0)	Norway	Čyžoŭka-Arena, Minsk; Attendance: 1,542

Game reference

Alexander Schmidt
Goalies
Tobias Breivold
Referee:
(Poland) Michał Baca
Linesmen:
(Belarus) Pavel Badyl
(France) Thomas Caillot

	0–1	01:55 – Spaberg Olsen (Løkkeberg)
	0–2	04:02 – Hermansson (Løkkeberg, Spaberg Olsen)
Payr (Nickl, Baumgartner) – 16:49	1–2
Huber (Lindner, Baumgartner) – 44:55	2–2
Harnisch (Lanzinger, Maier) – 48:55	3–2
Baumgartner (SH, EN) – 59:12	4–2
Baumgartner (Payr) (SH, EN) – 59:54	5–2

10 min
Penalties
10 min
30
Shots
16

10 December 2019; 19:30	Latvia	3–2 OT (0–1, 0–0, 2–1) (OT: 1–0)	Belarus	Čyžoŭka-Arena, Minsk; Attendance: 6,541

Game reference

Jānis Voris
Goalies
Nikita Tolopilo
Referee:
(Italy) Andrea Moschen
Linesmen:
(Italy) Nicola Basso
(Switzerland) Dario Fuchs

	0–1	06:11 – Kotelovski (Oxentyuk, Usov) (PP)
Prohorenkovs (Mateiko, Polcs) – 44:57	1–1
Zabusovs (Prohorenkovs, Jevdokimovs) – 46:11	2–1
	2–2	57:50 – Denisov (Oxentyuk, Buyalski) (PP)
Švanenbergs (Ošenieks) – 60:13	3–2

22 min
Penalties
8 min
29
Shots
20

12 December 2019; 12:30	Slovenia	1–9 (0–5, 1–1, 0–3)	Latvia	Čyžoŭka-Arena, Minsk; Attendance: 1,314

Game reference

Val Usnik
Žiga Kogovšek
Goalies
Jānis Voris
Bruno Brūveris
Referee:
(Spain) Alexey Roshchyn
Linesmen:
(Belarus) Pavel Badyl
(Switzerland) Dario Fuchs

	0–1	00:48 – Švanenbergs (Grīnbergs, Bucenieks)
	0–2	02:25 – Siņegubovs (Fjodorovs, Švanenbergs) (PP)
	0–3	05:01 – Jašunovs (Skrastiņš, Polcs)
	0–4	08:50 – Zabusovs (Prohorenkovs)
	0–5	11:32 – Švanenbergs (Grīnbergs, Tumānovs)
Primožič (Mašič, Mežnar) (PP) – 32:30	1–5
	1–6	36:39 – Fjodorovs (Spilva, Ošenieks)
	1–7	50:05 – Fjodorovs (Jašunovs, Siņegubovs)
	1–8	50:47 – Tumānovs (Grīnbergs, Švanenbergs)
	1–9	58:02 – Jašunovs (Grīnbergs, Ošenieks) (PP)

12 min
Penalties
8 min
11
Shots
37

12 December 2019; 16:00	Denmark	2–4 (1–1, 1–2, 0–1)	Austria	Čyžoŭka-Arena, Minsk; Attendance: 1,359

Game reference

Mads Søgaard
Goalies
Alexander Schmidt
Referee:
(Norway) Marcus Wannerstedt
Linesmen:
(Belarus) Mikita Paliakou
(Estonia) Toivo Tilku

	0–1	04:16 – Maier (Schmid) (EA)
Jensen (Biel) – 19:35	1–1
	1–2	20:35 – Peeters (Huber, Baumgartner)
	1–3	26:30 – Baumgartner (Huber)
Schultz (True) – 35:24	2–3
	2–4	47:00 – Peeters (Baumgartner)

20 min
Penalties
2 min
24
Shots
39

12 December 2019; 19:30	Belarus	2–3 OT (0–2, 1–0, 1–0) (OT: 0–1)	Norway	Čyžoŭka-Arena, Minsk; Attendance: 6,888

Game reference

Nikita Tolopilo
Goalies
Henrik Fayen Vestavik
Referee:
(Poland) Michał Baca
Linesmen:
(France) Thomas Caillot
(Slovakia) Lukáš Kacej

	0–1	06:55 – Hafsmoe (Strandborg, Elvsveen)
	0–2	19:06 – Rødne (Rønningen, Granath) (PP)
Pinchuk (Protas, Alistrov) – 31:38	1–2
Oxentyuk (Shyochin, Shkrabov) (EA) – 59:20	2–2
	2–3	61:48 – Hermansson (Lilleberg, Hafsmoe)

14 min
Penalties
14 min
35
Shots
32

13 December 2019; 12:30	Latvia	1–2 (1–1, 0–1, 0–0)	Austria	Čyžoŭka-Arena, Minsk; Attendance: 1,582

Game reference

Jānis Voris
Goalies
Alexander Schmidt
Referee:
(Italy) Andrea Moschen
Linesmen:
(Italy) Nicola Basso
(Estonia) Toivo Tilku

Zabusovs (Ozols, Brants) – 05:07	1–0
	1–1	09:44 – Baumgartner (Payr, Huber) (PP2)
	1–2	24:40 – Lindner (Harnisch, Peeters) (PP)

60 min
Penalties
4 min
29
Shots
23

13 December 2019; 16:00	Norway	1–0 GWS (0–0, 0–0, 0–0) (OT: 0–0) (SO: 1–0)	Denmark	Čyžoŭka-Arena, Minsk; Attendance: 1,593

Game reference
Henrik Fayen Vestavik	Goalies	Mads Søgaard	Referee: (Spain) Alexey Roshchyn; Linesmen: (Slovakia) Lukáš Kacej (Belarus) Mikita Paliakou
Hermansson (miss); Rødne (miss); Rønningen (miss); Spaberg Olsen; Finstad	Shootout	(miss) Jensen; (miss) True; (miss) Schultz; (miss) Green; (miss) Brinkman	Referee: (Spain) Alexey Roshchyn; Linesmen: (Slovakia) Lukáš Kacej (Belarus) Mikita Paliakou
4 min	Penalties	6 min	Referee: (Spain) Alexey Roshchyn; Linesmen: (Slovakia) Lukáš Kacej (Belarus) Mikita Paliakou
26	Shots	29	Referee: (Spain) Alexey Roshchyn; Linesmen: (Slovakia) Lukáš Kacej (Belarus) Mikita Paliakou

13 December 2019; 19:30	Belarus	4–1 (0–0, 1–0, 3–1)	Slovenia	Čyžoŭka-Arena, Minsk; Attendance: 6,318

Game reference

Alexei Kolosov
Goalies
Val Usnik
Referee:
(Norway) Marcus Wannerstedt
Linesmen:
(France) Thomas Caillot
(Switzerland) Dario Fuchs

Kashelovski (Buyalski, Kozorez) – 30:08	1–0
Pavlenko (Denisov, Azhgirei) – 40:52	2–0
Solovyov (Oxentyuk) – 41:52	3–0
Protas (Usov) – 58:50	4–0
	4–1	59:30 – Bohinc (Razingar, Predan)

6 min
Penalties
6 min
46
Shots
14

15 December 2019; 12:30	Austria	4–1 (2–0, 0–0, 2–1)	Slovenia	Čyžoŭka-Arena, Minsk; Attendance: 1,491

Game reference

Alexander Schmidt
Goalies
Val Usnik
Referee:
(Poland) Michał Baca
Linesmen:
(Belarus) Pavel Badyl
(Italy) Nicola Basso

Peeters (Nickl, Huber) (PP) – 16:51	1–0
Huber (Nickl, Baumgartner) – 19:28	2–0
	2–1	52:40 – Tavčar (Jakupović, Markun)
Rebernig (Lanzinger, Payr) – 55:36	3–1
Huber (Peeters, Maier) (ENG) – 58:13	4–1

2 min
Penalties
10 min
40
Shots
26

15 December 2019; 16:00	Norway	0–2 (0–0, 0–1, 0–1)	Latvia	Čyžoŭka-Arena, Minsk; Attendance: 2,035

Game reference
Henrik Fayen Vestavik	Goalies	Jānis Voris	Referee: (Spain) Alexey Roshchyn; Linesmen: (Belarus) Mikita Paliakou (Estonia) Toivo Tilku
0–1 / 25:05 – Grīnbergs (Švanenbergs, Tumānovs); 0–2 / 48:08 – Polcs (Ošenieks, Jevdokimovs)			Referee: (Spain) Alexey Roshchyn; Linesmen: (Belarus) Mikita Paliakou (Estonia) Toivo Tilku
4 min	Penalties	10 min	Referee: (Spain) Alexey Roshchyn; Linesmen: (Belarus) Mikita Paliakou (Estonia) Toivo Tilku
13	Shots	23	Referee: (Spain) Alexey Roshchyn; Linesmen: (Belarus) Mikita Paliakou (Estonia) Toivo Tilku

15 December 2019; 19:30	Denmark	2–7 (0–4, 0–1, 2–2)	Belarus	Čyžoŭka-Arena, Minsk; Attendance: 7,002

Game reference

Mads Søgaard
Frederik Dichow
Goalies
Alexei Kolosov
Referee:
(Italy) Andrea Moschen
Linesmen:
(Switzerland) Dario Fuchs
(Slovakia) Lukáš Kacej

	0–1	01:16 – Shyochin (Protas, Oxentyuk)
	0–2	02:42 – Shkrabov (Pyshkailo, Pavlenko)
	0–3	15:12 – Alistrov (Kachelovski, Protas) (PP2)
	0–4	16:06 – Protas (Solovyov, Alistrov) (PP2)
	0–5	30:49 – Pyshkailo (Solovyov, Krylovich)
True (Brinkman, Schultz) (PP) – 45:42	1–5
Schultz (Green, Jensen) – 48:41	2–5
	2–6	50:14 – Protas (Oxentyuk, Kotelovski)
	2–7	53:27 – Barkovski (Azhgirei, Denisov)

22 min
Penalties
18 min
24
Shots
30

=== Statistics ===
==== Top 10 scorers ====
Pos	Player	Country	GP	G	A	Pts	+/–	PIM
1	Benjamin Baumgartner	Austria	5	5	6	11	+10	10
2	Paul Huber	Austria	5	4	4	8	+8	0
3	Jānis Švanenbergs	Latvia	5	3	5	8	+7	6
4	Aliaksei Protas	Belarus	5	4	3	7	+3	6
5	Yevgeni Oxentyuk	Belarus	5	1	6	7	+4	6
6	Senna Peeters	Austria	5	3	3	6	+9	4
7	Ričards Grīnbergs	Latvia	5	1	5	6	+8	6
8	Phillip Schultz	Denmark	5	2	3	5	0	8
9	Patriks Zabusovs	Latvia	5	3	1	4	+6	2
10	Deniss Fjodorovs	Latvia	4	2	2	4	+3	22

GP = Games played; G = Goals; A = Assists; Pts = Points; +/− = Plus–minus; PIM = Penalties In Minutes
Source: IIHF.com

==== Goaltending leaders ====
(minimum 40% team's total ice time)

Pos	Player	Country	TOI	GA	Sv%	GAA	SO
1	Henrik Fayen Vestavik	Norway	184:37	4	95.40	1.30	1
2	Jānis Voris	Latvia	278:56	5	93.90	1.08	2
3	Alexei Kolosov	Belarus	161:25	4	92.98	1.49	0
4	Alexander Schmidt	Austria	299:50	10	92.65	2.00	0
5	Val Usnik	Slovenia	189:43	13	90.65	4.11	0

TOI = Time On Ice (minutes:seconds); GA = Goals against; GAA = Goals against average; Sv% = Save percentage; SO = Shutouts
Source: IIHF.com

==== Best Players Selected by the Directorate ====
- Goaltender: (Latvia) Jānis Voris
- Defenceman: (Belarus) Ilya Solovyov
- Forward: (Austria) Benjamin Baumgartner

Source: IIHF.com

== Division I B ==
2020 IIHF U20 World Championship Division I B

Tournament details
- Host country: Ukraine
- City: Kyiv
- Venue(s): 1 (in 1 host city)
- Dates: 12–18 December 2019
- Teams: 6

Tournament statistics
- Games played: 15
- Goals scored: 121 (8.07 per game)
- Attendance: 35,295 (2,353 per game)
- Scoring leader(s): (Poland) Jakub Lewandowski (13 points)

Official website
- www.iihf.com

The Division I B tournament was played in Kyiv, Ukraine, from 12 to 18 December 2019.

=== Participating teams ===
Team	Qualification
France	placed 6th in Division I A last year and were relegated
Poland	placed 2nd in Division I B last year
Hungary	placed 3rd in Division I B last year
Italy	placed 4th in Division I B last year
Ukraine	hosts; placed 5th in Division I B last year
Estonia	placed 1st in Division II A last year and were promoted

=== Match officials ===
4 referees and 7 linesmen were selected for the tournament.

Referees

- (Slovenia) Miha Bulovec
- (Sweden) Richard Magnusson
- (United Kingdom) Andrew Miller
- (Denmark) Rasmus Toppel

Linesmen

- (Switzerland) Roman Kaderli
- (Ukraine) Ilya Khohlov
- (United Kingdom) Ilia Kisil
- (Ukraine) Artem Korepanov
- (Denmark) Andreas Weise Krøyer
- (Germany) Patrick Laguzov
- (Belarus) Nazar Slezov

=== Final standings ===
Division I B Venue
Kyiv
Palace of Sports
Capacity: 7,000
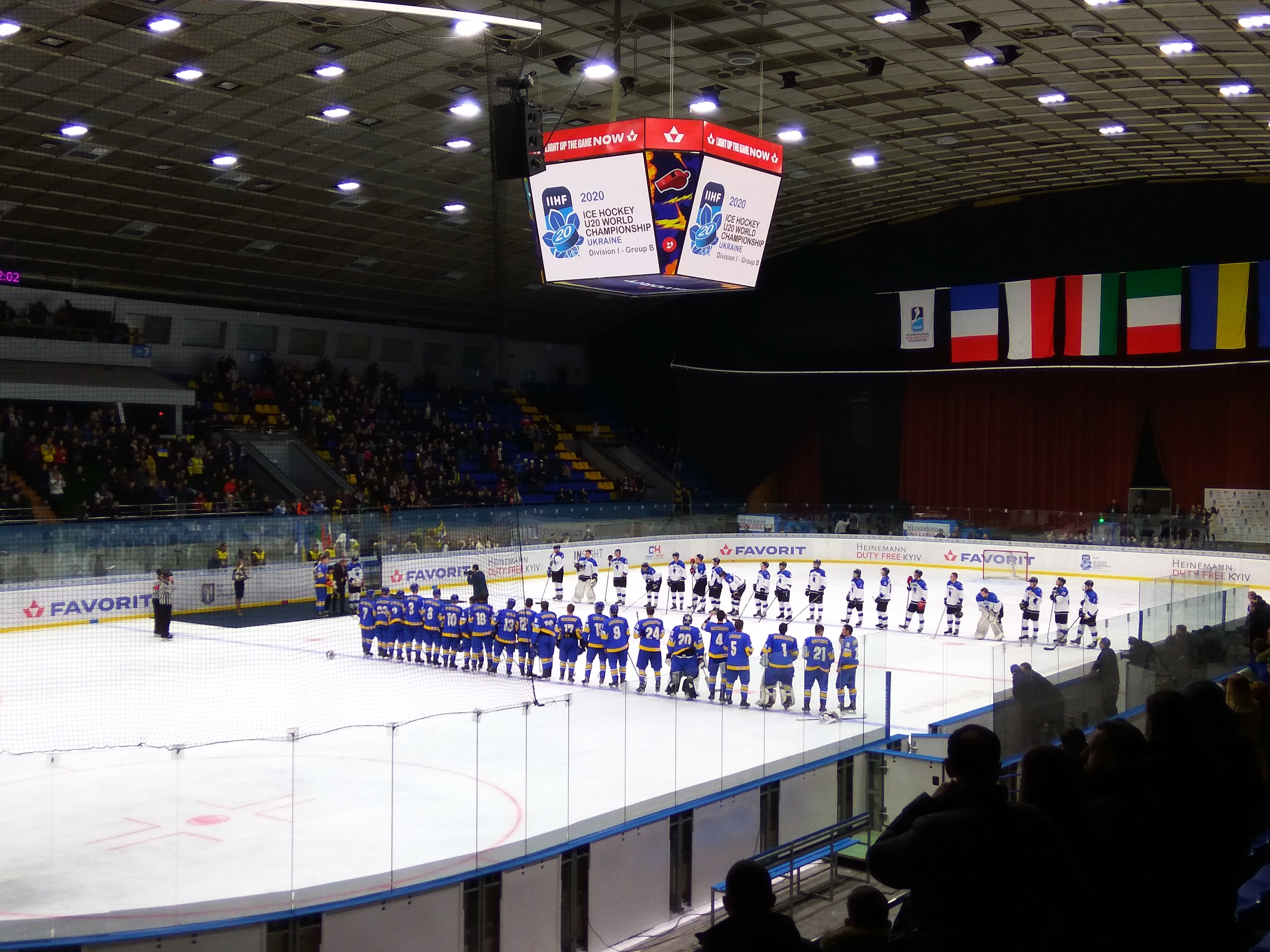

Pos	Team	Pld	W	OTW	OTL	L	GF	GA	GD	Pts	Promotion or relegation
1	Hungary	5	5	0	0	0	29	16	+13	15	Promoted to the 2022 Division I A
2	France	5	4	0	0	1	22	7	+15	12	
3	Ukraine (H)	5	2	1	0	2	14	12	+2	8	
4	Poland	5	2	0	0	3	29	26	+3	6	
5	Estonia	5	1	0	0	4	14	27	−13	3	
6	Italy	5	0	0	1	4	13	33	−20	1	Relegated to the 2022 Division II A

Source: IIHF
Rules for classification: 1) points; 2) head-to-head points; 3) head-to-head goal difference; 4) head-to-head number of goals scored; 5) result against closest best-ranked team outside tied teams; 6) result against second-best-ranked team outside tied teams; 7) seeding before tournament.
(H) Host

=== Match results ===
All times are local (Eastern European Time – UTC+2).

12 December 2019; 13:00	Italy	3–15 (1–3, 1–8, 1–4)	Poland	Palace of Sports, Kyiv; Attendance: 330

Game reference

Davide Fadani
Jakob Rabanser
Goalies
Sebastian Lipiński
Maciej Miarka
Referee:
(United Kingdom) Andrew Miller
Linesmen:
(Switzerland) Roman Kaderli
(Denmark) Andreas Weise Krøyer

	0–1	07:51 – Lewandowski (Wałęga, Krzyżek)
	0–2	09:44 – Brynkus (Lewandowski, Krzyżek) (PP)
	0–3	12:31 – Witan (Tyczyński, Naróg) (PP)
Sölva (Großrubatscher) – 17:01	1–3
S. Deluca – 20:14	2–3
	2–4	22:13 – Filipek (Tyczyński, Bezwiński)
	2–5	23:19 – Wałęga (Lewandowski)
	2–6	27:18 – Smal (Witan, Tyczyński)
	2–7	29:31 – Bieniek (Lewandowski)
	2–8	31:53 – Gruźla (Ubowski)
	2–9	32:05 – Brynkus (Wałęga, Lewandowski)
	2–10	33:03 – Filipek (Blanik, Witan)
	2–11	39:27 – Lewandowski (Wałęga) (PP)
Großrubatscher – 44:46	3–11
	3–12	48:24 – Blanik (Filipek, Bezwiński)
	3–13	48:53 – Wałęga
	3–14	55:54 – Wałęga (Tyczyński, Witan) (PP2)
	3–15	56:15 – Wałęga (Lewandowski, Brynkus) (PP)

14 min
Penalties
4 min
19
Shots
33

12 December 2019; 16:30	Estonia	1–6 (0–2, 1–1, 0–3)	France	Palace of Sports, Kyiv; Attendance: 567

Game reference

Christopher-Kullervo Jõgi
Goalies
Valentin Duquenne
Referee:
(Slovenia) Miha Bulovec
Linesmen:
(Ukraine) Ilya Khohlov
(Ukraine) Artem Korepanov

	0–1	08:15 – Fabre (Dubé, Plagnat) (PP)
	0–2	11:07 – Dubé (Plagnat, Schmitt)
Rae (Kiik, Kr. Jõgi) – 31:36	1–2
	1–3	33:36 – Joubert (Vialatte, Coulaud)
	1–4	42:51 – Zago (Vialatte, Schmitt)
	1–5	43:40 – Coulaud (Plagnat, Dubé) (PP)
	1–6	59:29 – Schmitt (ENG)

8 min
Penalties
6 min
18
Shots
29

12 December 2019; 20:00	Ukraine	1–5 (0–1, 1–3, 0–1)	Hungary	Palace of Sports, Kyiv; Attendance: 4,567

Game reference

Artur Ohandzhanyan
Goalies
Levente Márkus
Referee:
(Sweden) Richard Magnusson
Linesmen:
(Germany) Patrick Laguzov
(Belarus) Nazar Slezov

	0–1	19:19 – Kovács (L. Horváth)
Arkhypenko (Danylenko) – 22:05	1–1
	1–2	22:43 – Németh (Rétfalvi)
	1–3	32:08 – Vértes (Dézsi)
	1–4	33:57 – Ambrus
	1–5	55:13 – Dézsi (Péter, Vértes)

10 min
Penalties
30 min
22
Shots
24

14 December 2019; 13:00	Hungary	4–2 (1–0, 1–2, 2–0)	Estonia	Palace of Sports, Kyiv; Attendance: 1,470

Game reference

Dominik Horváth
Goalies
Mark Teor
Referee:
(Denmark) Rasmus Toppel
Linesmen:
(Ukraine) Artem Korepanov
(Germany) Patrick Laguzov

Vértes (Dézsi, M. Horváth) (PP) – 18:04	1–0
	1–1	24:54 – Lodeikin (Kiik, Kr. Jõgi) (PP)
M. Horváth (Vértes, Péter) (PP2) – 34:53	2–1
	2–2	36:59 – Kl. Jõgi (Appelberg, Rae) (PP)
Keresztes (Páterka, Csollák) – 49:50	3–2
Keresztes (Páterka, Révész) – 54:57	4–2

20 min
Penalties
20 min
41
Shots
26

14 December 2019; 16:30	France	4–1 (0–0, 1–1, 3–0)	Italy	Palace of Sports, Kyiv; Attendance: 2,134

Game reference

Valentin Duquenne
Goalies
Davide Fadani
Referee:
(Sweden) Richard Magnusson
Linesmen:
(Ukraine) Ilya Khohlov
(Belarus) Nazar Slezov

	0–1	21:52 – De Toni
Plagnat (Fabre, Dubé) – 27:19	1–1
Dubé (Coulaud) – 43:40	2–1
Plagnat (Fabre) – 46:31	3–1
Fabre – 59:25	4–1

4 min
Penalties
6 min
43
Shots
15

14 December 2019; 20:00	Poland	0–3 (0–1, 0–0, 0–2)	Ukraine	Palace of Sports, Kyiv; Attendance: 5,450

Game reference

Sebastian Lipiński
Goalies
Artur Ohandzhanyan
Referee:
(Slovenia) Miha Bulovec
Linesmen:
(Switzerland) Roman Kaderli
(United Kingdom) Ilia Kisil

0–1	05:44 – Peresunko (Morozov, Matusevych)
0–2	44:32 – Danylenko (Morozov, Vasylyev)
0–3	56:15 – Peresunko (PS)

6 min
Penalties
10 min
27
Shots
28

15 December 2019; 13:00	Estonia	5–4 (0–3, 3–1, 2–0)	Italy	Palace of Sports, Kyiv; Attendance: 1,587

Game reference

Christopher-Kullervo Jõgi
Mark Teor
Goalies
Davide Fadani
Referee:
(Sweden) Richard Magnusson
Linesmen:
(United Kingdom) Ilia Kisil
(Ukraine) Artem Korepanov

	0–1	01:44 – Demetz (De Toni) (PP)
	0–2	04:50 – De Toni
	0–3	15:32 – Demetz (Ma. Sölva)
Lodeikin (Alexandrov) – 21:50	1–3
Rae (Mürkel) – 22:01	2–3
	2–4	27:39 – Tomasini (Großrubatscher, R. Deluca) (PP)
Lodeikin (Stetski, Alexandrov) – 32:00	3–4
Kombe (Lodeikin) (PP) – 46:29	4–4
Lodeikin (Kulintsev) (PP) – 59:53	5–4

33 min
Penalties
26 min
23
Shots
19

15 December 2019; 16:30	Poland	7–10 (3–4, 2–5, 2–1)	Hungary	Palace of Sports, Kyiv; Attendance: 2,124

Game reference

Sebastian Lipiński
Maciej Miarka
Goalies
Levente Márkus
Referee:
(Denmark) Rasmus Toppel
Linesmen:
(Denmark) Andreas Weise Krøyer
(Belarus) Nazar Slezov

Lewandowski (Libik) – 01:24	1–0
Smal (Brynkus) – 05:58	2–0
	2–1	07:51 – Rétfalvi (Pokornyi, Ambrus)
	2–2	08:15 – Vértes (Dézsi)
Bezwiński (Lewandowski) – 09:19	3–2
	3–3	11:03 – Péter (Vértes, Dézsi) (PP)
	3–4	19:18 – Keresztes (Páterka, Révész)
	3–5	23:37 – Ambrus (Németh, Rétfalvi)
	3–6	28:14 – Vértes (Pokornyi, Bogesic)
	3–7	31:53 – Révész (Páterka, Keresztes)
Wałęga (Smal) – 33:01	4–7
	4–8	37:47 – Révész (Pokornyi, Páterka)
	4–9	38:21 – Németh (Rétfalvi, Seregély)
Lewandowski (Khoperia) – 39:28	5–9
Luszniak (Witan, Biłas) – 50:44	6–9
Brynkus (Smal, Wałęga) (PP) – 53:48	7–9
	7–10	59:28 – Péter (Ambrus, Szécsi)

20 min
Penalties
10 min
33
Shots
31

15 December 2019; 20:00	France	3–1 (2–1, 0–0, 1–0)	Ukraine	Palace of Sports, Kyiv; Attendance: 4,098

Game reference

Valentin Duquenne
Goalies
Artur Ohandzhanyan
Referee:
(United Kingdom) Andrew Miller
Linesmen:
(Switzerland) Roman Kaderli
(Germany) Patrick Laguzov

Rousseau (Schmitt, Tomasino) – 04:21	1–0
Dubé (Fabre) – 05:25	2–0
	2–1	19:00 – Arkhypenko (Morozov, Danylenko)
Dubé (Fabre, Plagnat) – 53:19	3–1

4 min
Penalties
0 min
43
Shots
19

17 December 2019; 13:00	Hungary	3–2 (2–0, 1–1, 0–1)	France	Palace of Sports, Kyiv; Attendance: 698

Game reference

Dominik Horváth
Goalies
Valentin Duquenne
Referee:
(Slovenia) Miha Bulovec
Linesmen:
(United Kingdom) Ilia Kisil
(Germany) Patrick Laguzov

Keresztes (Révész, Pokornyi) – 06:10	1–0
Révész (Páterka) – 08:58	2–0
Dóczi (Keresztes, Páterka) (PP) – 26:59	3–0
	3–1	34:46 – Tomasino (Boscq) (PP)
	3–2	51:47 – Rousseau

10 min
Penalties
8 min
25
Shots
32

17 December 2019; 16:30	Poland	6–3 (2–1, 1–2, 3–0)	Estonia	Palace of Sports, Kyiv; Attendance: 1,498

Game reference

Maciej Miarka
Goalies
Mark Teor
Referee:
(United Kingdom) Andrew Miller
Linesmen:
(Ukraine) Ilya Khohlov
(Denmark) Andreas Weise Krøyer

	0–1	01:20 – Lodeikin (Alexandrov)
Lewandowski (Khoperia, Tyczyński) – 07:43	1–1
Biłas (Smal, Bieniek) – 16:55	2–1
	2–2	31:31 – Kombe (Kiik, Kr. Jõgi)
Tyczyński (Witan, Lewandowski) – 35:52	3–2
	3–3	37:56 – Kiik (Stetski)
Wałęga (Lewandowski) – 41:40	4–3
Smal (Brynkus, Blanik) – 57:57	5–3
Gruźla (ENG) – 58:57	6–3

4 min
Penalties
2 min
41
Shots
17

17 December 2019; 20:00	Italy	1–2 GWS (1–1, 0–0, 0–0) (OT: 0–0) (SO: 0–1)	Ukraine	Palace of Sports, Kyiv; Attendance: 4,587

Game reference
Davide Fadani	Goalies	Artur Ohandzhanyan	Referee: (Denmark) Rasmus Toppel; Linesmen: (Switzerland) Roman Kaderli (Belarus) Nazar Slezov
/ 0–1 / 12:15 – Kryvoshapkin (Mateichenko, Peresunko); Öhler (Ma. Sölva) – 12:49 / 1–1			Referee: (Denmark) Rasmus Toppel; Linesmen: (Switzerland) Roman Kaderli (Belarus) Nazar Slezov
S. Deluca (miss); De Toni (miss); Öhler; Ma. Sölva (miss)	Shootout	Kryvoshapkin; (miss) Morozov; Peresunko; Arkhypenko	Referee: (Denmark) Rasmus Toppel; Linesmen: (Switzerland) Roman Kaderli (Belarus) Nazar Slezov
8 min	Penalties	8 min	Referee: (Denmark) Rasmus Toppel; Linesmen: (Switzerland) Roman Kaderli (Belarus) Nazar Slezov
19	Shots	33	Referee: (Denmark) Rasmus Toppel; Linesmen: (Switzerland) Roman Kaderli (Belarus) Nazar Slezov

18 December 2019; 13:00	France	7–1 (1–0, 2–0, 4–1)	Poland	Palace of Sports, Kyiv; Attendance: 453

Game reference

Florian Gourdin
Goalies
Sebastian Lipiński
Maciej Miarka
Referees:
(Sweden) Richard Magnusson
(United Kingdom) Andrew Miller
Linesmen:
(Ukraine) Artem Korepanov
(Denmark) Andreas Weise Krøyer

Bruche (Dubé) (PP2) – 19:31	1–0
Dubé (Plagnat, Fabre) – 33:40	2–0
Zago (Vialatte, Joubert) – 34:41	3–0
Fabre (Mainot, Plagnat) (PP) – 44:32	4–0
Dair (Bruche, Vitou) – 44:37	5–0
	5–1	50:48 – Brynkus (Bieniek, Blanik)
Vitou (Bruche) – 55:13	6–1
Zago (Vialatte, Joubert) – 55:58	7–1

12 min
Penalties
41 min
39
Shots
22

18 December 2019; 16:30	Hungary	7–4 (3–1, 2–2, 2–1)	Italy	Palace of Sports, Kyiv; Attendance: 1,342

Game reference

Dominik Horváth
Goalies
Davide Fadani
Referee:
(Denmark) Rasmus Toppel
Linesmen:
(Switzerland) Roman Kaderli
(Ukraine) Ilya Khohlov

Révész (Keresztes, Páterka) (PP) – 06:47	1–0
Rétfalvi (Ambrus) – 07:58	2–0
Keresztes (Csollák, Ambrus) – 08:36	3–0
	3–1	10:02 – Ma. Sölva (Öhler)
Dézsi (Vértes) – 26:38	4–1
	4–2	28:35 – Mi. Sölva (Demetz)
	4–3	30:32 – Andreotti (Zecchetto, Bossi)
Vértes (Péter, Szécsi) – 33:03	5–3
	5–4	48:23 – Tomasini (S. Deluca, R. Deluca) (PP)
Vértes (Dézsi, Péter) (ENG) – 57:03	6–4
Páterka (Keresztes, Révész) – 57:41	7–4

18 min
Penalties
6 min
35
Shots
38

18 December 2019; 20:00	Ukraine	7–3 (2–2, 4–0, 1–1)	Estonia	Palace of Sports, Kyiv; Attendance: 4,390

Game reference

Artur Ohandzhanyan
Goalies
Christopher-Kullervo Jõgi
Mark Teor
Referee:
(Slovenia) Miha Bulovec
Linesmen:
(United Kingdom) Ilia Kisil
(Belarus) Nazar Slezov

	0–1	10:14 – Kl. Jõgi (Kr. Jõgi, Kiik)
	0–2	16:23 – Lodeikin (Kiik, Kombe) (PP)
Morozov (Lohach, Ratushnyi) – 17:22	1–2
Kryvoshapkin (Mateichenko, Peresunko) – 19:04	2–2
Morozov (Danylenko, Arkhypenko) – 26:59	3–2
Peresunko (Mateichenko, Kryvoshapkin) – 27:49	4–2
Matusevych – 28:37	5–2
Morozov (Arkhypenko, Danylenko) – 28:47	6–2
	6–3	41:22 – Lodeikin (Kombe, Medvedev)
Morozov (Arkhypenko, Danylenko) (ENG) – 57:02	7–3

6 min
Penalties
4 min
30
Shots
20

=== Statistics ===
==== Top 10 scorers ====
Pos	Player	Country	GP	G	A	Pts	+/–	PIM
1	Jakub Lewandowski	Poland	5	5	8	13	+7	4
2	Kamil Wałęga	Poland	5	6	5	11	+1	12
3	Nátán Vértes	Hungary	5	6	4	10	+6	8
4	Pierrick Dubé	France	5	5	4	9	+7	8
4	Levente Keresztes	Hungary	5	5	4	9	+3	0
6	Marcell Révész	Hungary	5	4	5	9	+6	12
7	Bence Páterka	Hungary	5	1	8	9	+5	2
8	Kirill Lodeikin	Estonia	5	7	1	8	–3	6
9	Dylan Fabre	France	5	3	5	8	+7	0
10	Antonin Plagnat	France	5	2	6	8	+8	0

GP = Games played; G = Goals; A = Assists; Pts = Points; +/− = Plus–minus; PIM = Penalties In Minutes
Source: IIHF.com

==== Goaltending leaders ====
(minimum 40% team's total ice time)

Pos	Player	Country	TOI	GA	Sv%	GAA	SO
1	Valentin Duquenne	France	240:00	6	92.21	1.50	0
2	Dominik Horváth	Hungary	180:00	8	91.67	2.67	0
3	Artur Ohandzhanyan	Ukraine	303:49	12	90.98	2.37	1
4	Mark Teor	Estonia	182:02	10	90.29	3.30	0
5	Levente Márkus	Hungary	120:00	8	85.45	4.00	0

TOI = Time On Ice (minutes:seconds); GA = Goals against; GAA = Goals against average; Sv% = Save percentage; SO = Shutouts
Source: IIHF.com

==== Best Players Selected by the Directorate ====
- Goaltender: (Ukraine) Artur Ohandzhanyan
- Defenceman: (Hungary) Dávid Pokornyi
- Forward: (France) Pierrick Dubé

Source: IIHF.com
