= Andrei Pavlenko (ice hockey) =

Belarusian ice hockey defenceman

- Born: April 6, 2000 (age 25) Minsk, Belarus
- Height: 6 ft 1 in (185 cm)
- Weight: 172 lb (78 kg; 12 st 4 lb)
- Position: Right wing
- Shoots: Left
- Belarus team Former teams: HK Lida; Dinamo Minsk; Yunost Minsk; Arlan Kokshetau; Humo Tashkent
- NHL draft: Undrafted
- Playing career: 2019–present

Andrei Pavlenko (born April 6, 2000) is a Belarusian professional ice hockey right winger who currently plays for HK Lida of the Belarusian Extraleague.

== Career ==
Pavlenko spent two seasons playing for the Edmonton Oil Kings of the Western Hockey League. He signed with Dinamo Minsk of the Kontinental Hockey League (KHL) on July 11, 2019.

== Career statistics ==
=== Regular season and playoffs ===
			Regular season					Playoffs
Season	Team	League	GP	G	A	Pts	PIM	GP	G	A	Pts	PIM
2017–18	Edmonton Oil Kings	WHL	20	3	1	4	12	—	—	—	—	—
2018–19	Edmonton Oil Kings	WHL	58	9	17	26	18	13	1	4	5	2
2019–20	Dinamo Minsk	KHL	22	0	1	1	8	—	—	—	—	—
2019–20	Yunost Minsk	BXL	3	1	1	2	0	—	—	—	—	—
2020–21	Dinamo Minsk	KHL	3	0	0	0	0	—	—	—	—	—
2020–21	Dinamo-Molodechno	BXL	30	3	3	6	20	6	0	0	0	2
KHL totals			25	0	1	1	8	—	—	—	—	—

=== International ===
Year	Team	Event	Result	GP	G	A	Pts	PIM
2017	Belarus	WJC18	9th	7	2	1	3	2
2019	Belarus	WJC-D1	12th	5	0	0	0	4
2020	Belarus	WJC-D1	13th	5	2	1	3	4
Junior totals				17	4	2	6	10
