= Benjamin Baumgartner =

Austrian ice hockey player (born 2000)

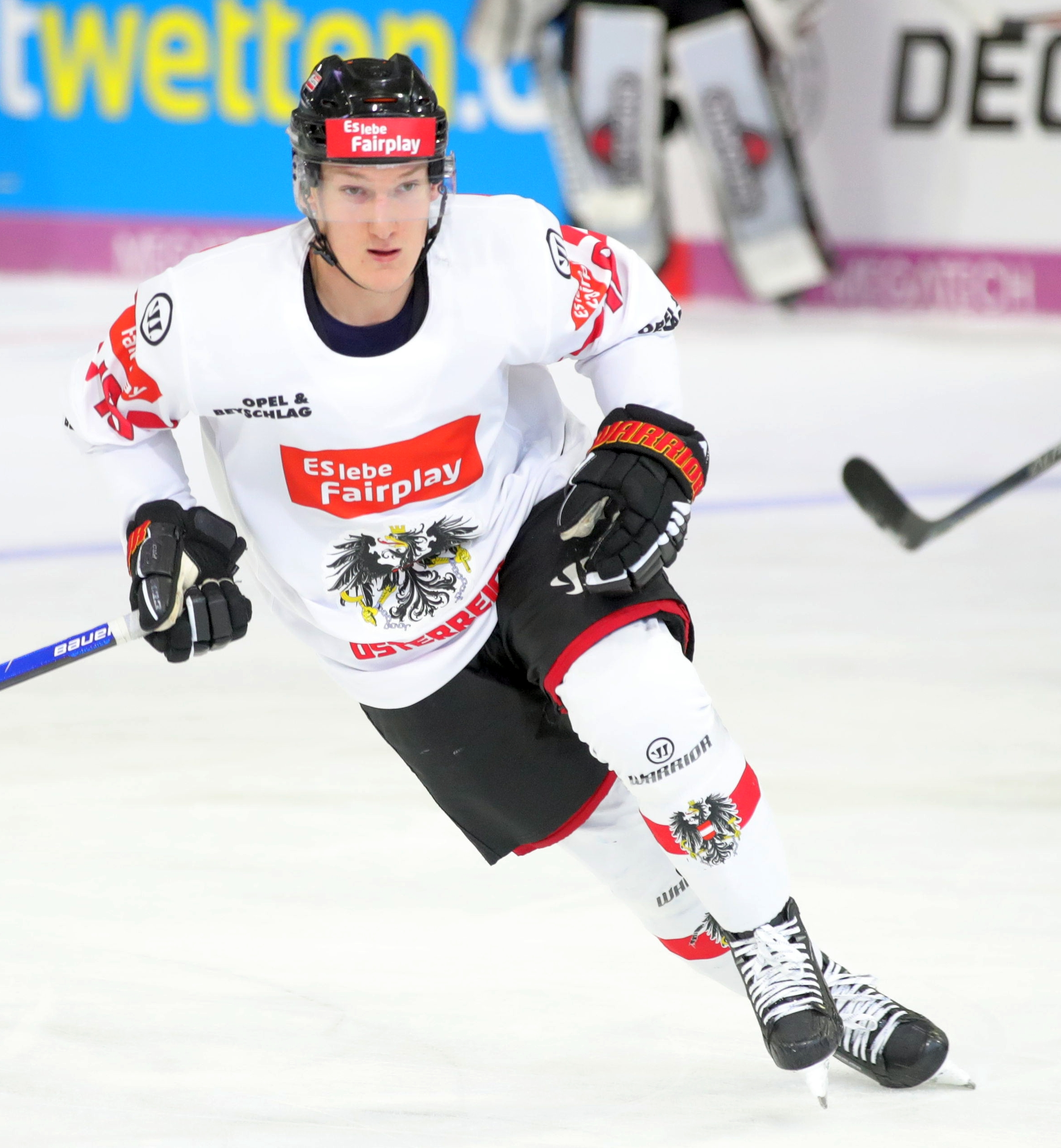
- Born: 22 April 2000 (age 26) Zell am See, Austria
- Height: 5 ft 9 in (175 cm)
- Weight: 165 lb (75 kg; 11 st 11 lb)
- Position: Forward
- Shoots: Left
- NL team Former teams: SC Bern; HC Davos; Lausanne HC
- National team: Austria
- NHL draft: 161st overall, 2020; New Jersey Devils
- Playing career: 2018–present

Benjamin Baumgartner (born 22 April 2000) is an Austrian ice hockey forward who plays for SC Bern in the National League (NL). He was selected by the New Jersey Devils in the sixth round, 161st overall, of the 2020 NHL entry draft.

== Playing career ==
Baumgartner began his youth career at the under‑17 level with the ZSC Lions before joining HC Davos' junior development program in 2014 at just 14 years old. He broke into the professional ranks in the 2018–19 season as an 18‑year‑old, appearing in 20 games for Davos and recording 1 goal and 4 points. On March 11, 2019, he secured his first full professional deal by signing a three‑year extension with HC Davos. Having progressed through HC Davos system, Baumgartner held a Swiss-player license in the NL.

During the 2019–20 season, Baumgartner suited up for HC Davos, tallying 27 points over 37 regular‑season games. He also missed several games while representing Austria's under‑20 national team at the 2020 World Junior Championships.

Baumgartner was selected 161st overall by the New Jersey Devils in the sixth round of the 2020 NHL entry draft, marking an important milestone in his career after previously going undrafted in both the 2018 and 2019 drafts despite being eligible.

== International play ==
As the youngest member of Austria's national team, Baumgartner earned the opportunity to compete on hockey's biggest international stage when he represented his country at the 2019 IIHF World Championship. Baumgartner appeared in four games during the tournament, but he ultimately concluded the championship without recording a goal or an assist.

== Career statistics ==
=== Regular season and playoffs ===
			Regular season					Playoffs
Season	Team	League	GP	G	A	Pts	PIM	GP	G	A	Pts	PIM
2016–17	HC Davos	Elite Jr. A	5	0	0	0	2	—	—	—	—	—
2017–18	HC Davos	Elite Jr. A	40	23	17	40	32	5	1	2	3	8
2018–19	HC Davos	Elite Jr. A	23	11	15	26	37	2	1	4	5	2
2018–19	HC Davos	NL	20	1	3	4	2	—	—	—	—	—
2018–19	HCB Ticino Rockets	SL	8	1	2	3	4	—	—	—	—	—
2019–20	HC Davos	NL	37	7	20	27	18	—	—	—	—	—
2020–21	HC Davos	NL	47	8	17	25	22	3	3	0	3	0
2021–22	Lausanne HC	NL	45	9	6	15	10	7	0	0	0	0
2022–23	SC Bern	NL	48	10	8	18	20	9	1	0	1	0
2023–24	SC Bern	NL	50	12	19	31	25	7	0	1	1	2
2024–25	SC Bern	NL	52	14	21	35	20	7	1	2	3	4
NL totals			299	61	94	155	117	33	5	3	8	6

=== International ===
Year	Team	Event	Result	GP	G	A	Pts	PIM
2017	Austria	WJC18-D1	18th	5	1	2	3	0
2018	Austria	WJC18-D1	18th	5	3	5	8	0
2018	Austria	WJC-D1	15th	5	4	0	4	2
2019	Austria	WJC-D1	15th	5	0	3	3	6
2019	Austria	WC	16th	4	0	0	0	0
2020	Austria	WJC-D1	11th	5	5	6	11	10
2021	Austria	OGQ	DNQ	3	0	1	1	2
2022	Austria	WC	11th	2	0	0	0	2
2024	Austria	WC	10th	6	3	0	3	4
2024	Austria	OGQ	DNQ	3	0	0	0	4
2025	Austria	WC	8th	7	2	1	3	0
Junior totals				25	13	16	29	18
Senior totals				25	5	2	7	12
