= Koppanen =

Koppanen is a surname. Notable people with the surname include:

- Esko Koppanen (1926–2002), Finnish bank director and politician
- Joona Koppanen (born 1998), Finnish ice hockey player
