= 2023–24 Boston Bruins season =

National Hockey League season

2023–24 Boston Bruins
- Division: 2nd Atlantic
- Conference: 4th Eastern
- 2023–24 record: 47–20–15
- Home record: 24–11–6
- Road record: 23–9–9
- Goals for: 267
- Goals against: 224

Team information
- General manager: Don Sweeney
- Coach: Jim Montgomery
- Captain: Brad Marchand
- Alternate captains: Charlie McAvoy; David Pastrnak
- Arena: TD Garden
- Average attendance: 17,850
- Minor league affiliates: Providence Bruins (AHL); Maine Mariners (ECHL)

Team leaders
- Goals: David Pastrnak (47)
- Assists: David Pastrnak (63)
- Points: David Pastrnak (110)
- Penalty minutes: Charlie McAvoy (86)
- Plus/minus: Brandon Carlo (+23)
- Wins: Jeremy Swayman (25)
- Goals against average: Jeremy Swayman (2.53)

The Boston Bruins 100th anniversary logo

The 2023–24 Boston Bruins season was the 100th season (99th season of play) for the National Hockey League (NHL) franchise that was established on November 1, 1924. The Bruins entered the season as the defending Presidents' Trophy winners, having finished the previous season with a 65–12–5 record that set the record for the most wins and points in an NHL season. Longtime Bruins players Patrice Bergeron and David Krejci retired during the off-season, with key players such as Tyler Bertuzzi, Connor Clifton and Dmitry Orlov also leaving during free agency and Taylor Hall departing via trade. Consequently, this was the Bruins' first season without Bergeron since 2002–03. The Bruins signed veteran free agents such as Kevin Shattenkirk and James van Riemsdyk, while also promoting youth talent in the form of John Beecher and Matt Poitras to the main roster. Brad Marchand was named the team's 27th team captain on September 20, 2023, succeeding Bergeron.

On March 28, 2024, the Bruins clinched a playoff berth for the eighth straight season. As a result, they maintain the NHL's longest active playoff streak, alongside the Toronto Maple Leafs, whom they faced in the first round, winning in seven games. In the second round, the Bruins faced the Florida Panthers, losing in six games to the eventual Stanley Cup champions, marking the second consecutive season the Bruins were eliminated by the Panthers.

== Standings ==
=== Divisional standings ===
Atlantic Division
Pos	Team	GP	W	L	OTL	RW	GF	GA	GD	Pts
1	y – Florida Panthers	82	52	24	6	42	268	200	+68	110
2	x – Boston Bruins	82	47	20	15	36	267	224	+43	109
3	x – Toronto Maple Leafs	82	46	26	10	33	303	263	+40	102
4	x – Tampa Bay Lightning	82	45	29	8	37	291	268	+23	98
5	Detroit Red Wings	82	41	32	9	27	278	274	+4	91
6	Buffalo Sabres	82	39	37	6	33	246	244	+2	84
7	Ottawa Senators	82	37	41	4	25	255	281	−26	78
8	Montreal Canadiens	82	30	36	16	20	236	289	−53	76

Source: National Hockey League
Rules for classification: 1) Fewer number of games played (GP, only during regular season); 2) Greater number of regulation wins (RW); 3) Greater number of wins in regulation and overtime, excluding shootout wins (ROW); 4) Greater number of total wins, including shootouts (W); 5) Greater number of points earned in head-to-head play; if teams played an uneven number of head-to-head games, the result of the first game on the home ice of the team with the extra home game is discarded; 6) Greater goal differential (GD); 7) Greater number of goals scored (GF)
x – Clinched playoff spot; y – Clinched division

=== Conference standings ===
Eastern Conference Wild Card
Pos	Div	Team	GP	W	L	OTL	RW	GF	GA	GD	Pts
1	AT	x – Tampa Bay Lightning	82	45	29	8	37	291	268	+23	98
2	ME	x – Washington Capitals	82	40	31	11	32	220	257	−37	91
3	AT	Detroit Red Wings	82	41	32	9	27	278	274	+4	91
4	ME	Pittsburgh Penguins	82	38	32	12	32	255	251	+4	88
5	ME	Philadelphia Flyers	82	38	33	11	30	235	261	−26	87
6	AT	Buffalo Sabres	82	39	37	6	33	246	244	+2	84
7	ME	New Jersey Devils	82	38	39	5	33	264	283	−19	81
8	AT	Ottawa Senators	82	37	41	4	25	255	281	−26	78
9	AT	Montreal Canadiens	82	30	36	16	20	236	289	−53	76
10	ME	Columbus Blue Jackets	82	27	43	12	21	237	300	−63	66

Source: National Hockey League
Rules for classification: 1) Fewer number of games played (GP, only during regular season); 2) Greater number of regulation wins (RW); 3) Greater number of wins in regulation and overtime, excluding shootout wins (ROW); 4) Greater number of total wins, including shootouts (W); 5) Greater number of points earned in head-to-head play; if teams played an uneven number of head-to-head games, the result of the first game on the home ice of the team with the extra home game is discarded; 6) Greater goal differential (GD); 7) Greater number of goals scored (GF)
x – Clinched playoff spot

== Schedule and results ==
=== Regular season ===
The Boston Bruins regular season schedule was released on June 27, 2023.

2023–24 game log

October: 8–0–1 (home: 4–0–1; road: 4–0–0)
#	Date	Visitor	Score	Home	OT	Decision	Attendance	Record	Pts	Recap
1	October 11	Chicago	1–3	Boston		Ullmark	17,565	1–0–0	2
2	October 14	Nashville	2–3	Boston		Swayman	17,850	2–0–0	4
3	October 19	Boston	3–1	San Jose		Ullmark	12,501	3–0–0	6
4	October 21	Boston	4–2	Los Angeles		Swayman	18,145	4–0–0	8
5	October 22	Boston	3–1	Anaheim		Ullmark	14,264	5–0–0	10
6	October 24	Boston	3–0	Chicago		Swayman	19,370	6–0–0	12
7	October 26	Anaheim	4–3	Boston	OT	Ullmark	17,850	6–0–1	13
8	October 28	Detroit	1–4	Boston		Swayman	17,850	7–0–1	15
9	October 30	Florida	2–3	Boston	OT	Ullmark	17,850	8–0–1	17

November: 7–4–2 (home: 4–1–0; road: 3–3–2)
#	Date	Visitor	Score	Home	OT	Decision	Attendance	Record	Pts	Recap
10	November 2	Toronto	2–3	Boston	SO	Swayman	17,850	9–0–1	19
11	November 4	Boston	4–5	Detroit		Ullmark	18,676	9–1–1	19
12	November 6	Boston	3–2	Dallas		Swayman	18,532	10–1–1	21
13	November 9	NY Islanders	2–5	Boston		Ullmark	17,850	11–1–1	23
14	November 11	Boston	2–3	Montreal	OT	Swayman	21,105	11–1–2	24
15	November 14	Boston	5–2	Buffalo		Ullmark	14,840	12–1–2	26
16	November 18	Montreal	2–5	Boston		Swayman	17,850	13–1–2	28
17	November 20	Boston	4–5	Tampa Bay	OT	Swayman	19,092	13–1–3	29
18	November 22	Boston	3–1	Florida		Ullmark	19,327	14–1–3	31
19	November 24	Detroit	5–2	Boston		Swayman	17,850	14–2–3	31
20	November 25	Boston	4–7	NY Rangers		Ullmark	18,006	14–3–3	31
21	November 27	Boston	2–5	Columbus		Ullmark	14,357	14–4–3	31
22	November 30	San Jose	0–3	Boston		Swayman	17,850	15–4–3	33

December: 7–3–3 (home: 3–1–2; road: 4–2–1)
#	Date	Visitor	Score	Home	OT	Decision	Attendance	Record	Pts	Recap
23	December 2	Boston	4–3	Toronto	OT	Ullmark	18,959	16–4–3	35
24	December 3	Columbus	1–3	Boston		Swayman	17,850	17–4–3	37
25	December 7	Buffalo	3–1	Boston		Ullmark	17,850	17–5–3	37
26	December 9	Arizona	3–5	Boston		Ullmark	17,850	18–5–3	39
27	December 13	Boston	1–2	New Jersey	OT	Swayman	16,514	18–5–4	40
28	December 15	Boston	5–4	NY Islanders	SO	Ullmark	17,255	19–5–4	42
29	December 16	NY Rangers	2–1	Boston	OT	Swayman	17,850	19–5–5	43
30	December 19	Minnesota	4–3	Boston	OT	Ullmark	17,850	19–5–6	44
31	December 22	Boston	1–5	Winnipeg		Swayman	14,405	19–6–6	44
32	December 23	Boston	2–3	Minnesota		Ullmark	19,183	19–7–6	44
33	December 27	Boston	4–1	Buffalo		Swayman	19,070	20–7–6	46
34	December 30	New Jersey	2–5	Boston		Ullmark	17,850	21–7–6	48
35	December 31	Boston	5–3	Detroit		Swayman	19,515	22–7–6	50

January: 9–2–3 (home: 5–2–0; road: 4–0–3)
#	Date	Visitor	Score	Home	OT	Decision	Attendance	Record	Pts	Recap
36	January 2	Boston	4–1	Columbus		Ullmark	18,262	23–7–6	52
37	January 4	Pittsburgh	6–5	Boston		Swayman	17,850	23–8–6	52
38	January 6	Tampa Bay	3–7	Boston		Ullmark	17,850	24–8–6	54
39	January 8	Boston	3–4	Colorado	SO	Swayman	18,050	24–8–7	55
40	January 9	Boston	3–4	Arizona	OT	Swayman	4,600	24–8–8	56
41	January 11	Boston	1–2	Vegas	OT	Swayman	18,209	24–8–9	57
42	January 13	Boston	4–3	St. Louis	OT	Swayman	18,096	25–8–9	59
43	January 15	New Jersey	0–3	Boston		Swayman	17,850	26–8–9	61
44	January 18	Colorado	2–5	Boston		Swayman	17,850	27–8–9	63
45	January 20	Montreal	4–9	Boston		Ullmark	17,850	28–8–9	65
46	January 22	Winnipeg	1–4	Boston		Swayman	17,850	29–8–9	67
47	January 24	Carolina	3–2	Boston		Ullmark	17,850	29–9–9	67
48	January 25	Boston	3–2	Ottawa	OT	Swayman	18,722	30–9–9	69
49	January 27	Boston	6–2	Philadelphia		Ullmark	19,276	31–9–9	71

February: 4–3–5 (home: 3–3–2; road: 1–0–3)
#	Date	Visitor	Score	Home	OT	Decision	Attendance	Record	Pts	Recap
50	February 6	Calgary	4–1	Boston		Swayman	17,850	31–10–9	71
51	February 8	Vancouver	0–4	Boston		Ullmark	17,850	32–10–9	73
52	February 10	Washington	3–0	Boston		Swayman	17,850	32–11–9	73
53	February 13	Tampa Bay	3–2	Boston	SO	Ullmark	17,850	32–11–10	74
54	February 15	Seattle	4–1	Boston		Swayman	17,850	32–12–10	74
55	February 17	Los Angeles	5–4	Boston	OT	Ullmark	17,850	32–12–11	75
56	February 19	Dallas	3–4	Boston	SO	Swayman	17,850	33–12–11	77
57	February 21	Boston	6–5	Edmonton	OT	Swayman	18,347	34–12–11	79
58	February 22	Boston	2–3	Calgary	OT	Ullmark	17,750	34–12–12	80
59	February 24	Boston	2–3	Vancouver	OT	Swayman	18,924	34–12–13	81
60	February 26	Boston	3–4	Seattle	SO	Ullmark	17,151	34–12–14	82
61	February 29	Vegas	4–5	Boston		Swayman	17,850	35–12–14	84

March: 8–5–1 (home: 4–2–1; road: 4–3–0)
#	Date	Visitor	Score	Home	OT	Decision	Attendance	Record	Pts	Recap
62	March 2	Boston	1–5	NY Islanders		Ullmark	17,255	35–13–14	84
63	March 4	Boston	4–1	Toronto		Swayman	18,911	36–13–14	86
64	March 5	Edmonton	2–1	Boston	OT	Ullmark	17,850	36–13–15	87
65	March 7	Toronto	1–4	Boston		Swayman	17,850	37–13–15	89
66	March 9	Pittsburgh	1–5	Boston		Ullmark	17,850	38–13–15	91
67	March 11	St. Louis	5–1	Boston		Swayman	17,850	38–14–15	91
68	March 14	Boston	2–1	Montreal	OT	Ullmark	21,105	39–14–15	93
69	March 16	Philadelphia	5–6	Boston		Swayman	17,850	40–14–15	95
70	March 19	Ottawa	2–6	Boston		Ullmark	17,850	41–14–15	97
71	March 21	NY Rangers	5–2	Boston		Swayman	17,850	41–15–15	97
72	March 23	Boston	2–3	Philadelphia		Ullmark	18,623	41–16–15	97
73	March 26	Boston	4–3	Florida		Swayman	18,689	42–16–15	99
74	March 27	Boston	1–3	Tampa Bay		Ullmark	19,092	42–17–15	99
75	March 30	Boston	3–2	Washington	SO	Swayman	18,573	43–17–15	101

April: 4–3–0 (home: 1–2–0; road: 3–1–0)
#	Date	Visitor	Score	Home	OT	Decision	Attendance	Record	Pts	Recap
76	April 2	Boston	3–0	Nashville		Ullmark	17,476	44–17–15	103
77	April 4	Boston	4–1	Carolina		Swayman	18,853	45–17–15	105
78	April 6	Florida	2–3	Boston	OT	Ullmark	17,850	46–17–15	107
79	April 9	Carolina	4–1	Boston		Swayman	17,850	46–18–15	107
80	April 13	Boston	6–4	Pittsburgh		Ullmark	18,393	47–18–15	109
81	April 15	Boston	0–2	Washington		Swayman	18,573	47–19–15	109
82	April 16	Ottawa	3–1	Boston		Ullmark	17,850	47–20–15	109

Legend: Win (2 points) Loss (0 points) Overtime/shootout loss (1 point)

=== Playoffs ===
2024 Stanley Cup playoffs

Eastern Conference first round vs. (A3) Toronto Maple Leafs: Boston won 4–3
#	Date	Visitor	Score	Home	OT	Decision	Attendance	Series	Recap
1	April 20	Toronto	1–5	Boston		Swayman	17,850	1–0
2	April 22	Toronto	3–2	Boston		Ullmark	17,850	1–1
3	April 24	Boston	4–2	Toronto		Swayman	19,423	2–1
4	April 27	Boston	3–1	Toronto		Swayman	19,256	3–1
5	April 30	Toronto	2–1	Boston	OT	Swayman	17,850	3–2
6	May 2	Boston	1–2	Toronto		Swayman	19,471	3–3
7	May 4	Toronto	1–2	Boston	OT	Swayman	17,850	4–3

Eastern Conference second round vs. (A1) Florida Panthers: Florida won 4–2
#	Date	Visitor	Score	Home	OT	Decision	Attendance	Series	Recap
1	May 6	Boston	5–1	Florida		Swayman	19,275	1–0
2	May 8	Boston	1–6	Florida		Swayman	19,789	1–1
3	May 10	Florida	6–2	Boston		Swayman	17,850	1–2
4	May 12	Florida	3–2	Boston		Swayman	17,850	1–3
5	May 14	Boston	2–1	Florida		Swayman	20,004	2–3
6	May 17	Florida	2–1	Boston		Swayman	17,850	2–4

Legend: Win Loss

== Player statistics ==
=== Skaters ===
Regular season
Player	GP	G	A	Pts	+/−	PIM
David Pastrnak	82	47	63	110	+21	47
Brad Marchand	82	29	38	67	+2	78
Charlie Coyle	82	25	35	60	–2	38
Pavel Zacha	78	21	38	59	+12	18
Charlie McAvoy	74	12	35	47	+4	86
Jake DeBrusk	80	19	21	40	+4	18
Trent Frederic	82	18	22	40	+9	69
Morgan Geekie	76	17	22	39	+6	28
James van Riemsdyk	71	11	27	38	+7	20
Danton Heinen	74	17	19	36	+16	28
Hampus Lindholm	73	3	23	26	+18	63
Kevin Shattenkirk	61	6	18	24	−2	18
Matt Poitras	33	5	10	15	+4	6
Jesper Boqvist	47	6	8	14	+12	8
Brandon Carlo	76	4	10	14	+23	42
Mason Lohrei	41	4	9	13	–2	18
Matt Grzelcyk	63	2	9	11	+13	37
John Beecher	52	7	3	10	−6	24
Jakub Lauko	60	2	8	10	−3	32
Parker Wotherspoon	41	0	8	8	+6	18
Justin Brazeau	19	5	2	7	+4	2
Derek Forbort	35	0	4	4	+8	17
Anthony Richard	9	1	2	3	0	2
Milan Lucic	4	0	2	2	−1	2
Ian Mitchell	13	0	2	2	+6	10
Andrew Peeke^{†}	14	0	2	2	+2	8
Patrick Brown	11	0	1	1	−3	2
Marc McLaughlin	1	1	0	1	+1	0
Oskar Steen	34	1	0	1	−2	4
Jayson Megna	1	0	0	0	0	0
Patrick Maroon^{†}	3	0	0	0	0	0
Georgii Merkulov	4	0	0	0	+1	0

Playoffs
Player	GP	G	A	Pts	+/−	PIM
Jake DeBrusk	13	5	6	11	–5	2
Brad Marchand	11	3	7	10	+3	16
David Pastrnak	13	4	4	8	0	25
Charlie McAvoy	13	1	5	6	–4	20
Pavel Zacha	13	1	5	6	+2	4
Morgan Geekie	13	4	1	5	0	6
Trent Frederic	13	3	2	5	+5	20
James van Riemsdyk	11	1	4	5	–1	0
Charlie Coyle	13	1	4	5	0	12
Brandon Carlo	13	3	1	4	+4	6
Mason Lohrei	11	1	3	4	0	10
Hampus Lindholm	13	1	3	4	+3	8
Justin Brazeau	9	1	1	2	+1	12
John Beecher	12	1	1	2	−4	2
Parker Wotherspoon	10	0	2	2	−1	6
Patrick Maroon	13	0	2	2	–2	18
Jakub Lauko	5	1	0	1	+1	2
Kevin Shattenkirk	6	0	1	1	–1	0
Jesper Boqvist	8	0	1	1	0	0
Danton Heinen	8	0	1	1	0	0
Patrick Brown	1	0	0	0	0	2
Derek Forbort	3	0	0	0	0	0
Matt Grzelcyk	3	0	0	0	0	2
Andrew Peeke	6	0	0	0	0	2

=== Goaltenders ===
Regular season
Player	GP	GS	TOI	W	L	OT	GA	GAA	SA	SV%	SO	G	A	PIM
Jeremy Swayman	44	43	2,565:51	25	10	8	108	2.53	1,287	.916	3	0	1	0
Linus Ullmark	40	39	2,400:08	22	10	7	103	2.57	1,207	.915	2	0	1	2

Playoffs
Player	GP	GS	TOI	W	L	GA	GAA	SA	SV%	SO	G	A	PIM
Jeremy Swayman	12	12	697:31	6	6	25	2.15	373	.933	0	0	0	0
Linus Ullmark	2	1	77:01	0	1	5	3.90	44	.886	0	0	0	0

^{†}Denotes player spent time with another team before joining the Bruins. Stats reflect time with the Bruins only.
^{‡}Denotes player was traded mid-season. Stats reflect time with the Bruins only.

== Transactions ==
The Bruins have been involved in the following transactions during the 2023–24 season.

Key:

† Contract is entry-level.
‡ Contract initially takes effect in the 2024–25 season.

=== Trades ===
Date	Details		Ref
March 8, 2024	To Columbus Blue Jackets Jakub Zboril; 3rd-round pick in 2027	To Boston Bruins Andrew Peeke	
March 8, 2024	To Minnesota Wild Luke Toporowski conditional 6th-round pick in 2026^{1}	To Boston Bruins Patrick Maroon	
June 24, 2024	To Ottawa Senators Linus Ullmark	To Boston Bruins Mark Kastelic; Joonas Korpisalo*; 1st-round pick in 2024	

Notes

- Bruins will receive this pick if Maroon plays at least one playoff game
- Senators retain 25% of Korpisalo's salary

=== Players acquired ===
Date	Player	Former team	Term	Via	Ref
July 1, 2023	Patrick Brown	Ottawa Senators	2-year	Free agency	
July 1, 2023	Morgan Geekie	Seattle Kraken	2-year	Free agency	
July 1, 2023	Milan Lucic	Calgary Flames	1-year	Free agency	
July 1, 2023	Jayson Megna	Anaheim Ducks	1-year	Free agency	
July 1, 2023	Anthony Richard	Montreal Canadiens	1-year	Free agency	
July 1, 2023	Kevin Shattenkirk	Anaheim Ducks	1-year	Free agency	
July 1, 2023	Luke Toporowski	Providence Bruins (AHL)	2-year†	Free agency	
July 1, 2023	James van Riemsdyk	Philadelphia Flyers	1-year	Free agency	
July 1, 2023	Parker Wotherspoon	New York Islanders	1-year	Free agency	
July 12, 2023	Jesper Boqvist	New Jersey Devils	1-year	Free agency	
October 30, 2023	Danton Heinen	Pittsburgh Penguins	1-year	Free agency	

=== Players lost ===
Date	Player	New team	Term	Via	Ref
July 1, 2023	Jack Ahcan	Colorado Avalanche	1-year	Free agency	
July 1, 2023	Connor Clifton	Buffalo Sabres	3-year	Free agency	
July 1, 2023	Garnet Hathaway	Philadelphia Flyers	2-year	Free agency	
July 1, 2023	Joona Koppanen	Pittsburgh Penguins	2-year	Free agency	
July 1, 2023	Vinni Lettieri	Minnesota Wild	2-year	Free agency	
July 1, 2023	Dmitry Orlov	Carolina Hurricanes	2-year	Free agency	
July 1, 2023	Mike Reilly	Florida Panthers	1-year	Free agency	
July 1, 2023	Chris Wagner	Colorado Avalanche	1-year	Free agency	
July 2, 2023	Tyler Bertuzzi	Toronto Maple Leafs	1-year	Free agency	
July 3, 2023	Connor Carrick	Seattle Kraken	1-year	Free agency	
July 5, 2023	Nick Wolff	San Diego Gulls (AHL)	1-year	Free agency	
July 13, 2023	Matt Filipe	Wilkes-Barre/Scranton Penguins (AHL)	1-year	Free agency	
July 15, 2023	Anton Stralman	HV71 (SHL)	1-year	Free agency	
July 19, 2023	Tomas Nosek	New Jersey Devils	1-year	Free agency	
July 25, 2023	Patrice Bergeron			Retirement	
August 14, 2023	David Krejci			Retirement	
October 9, 2023	A. J. Greer	Calgary Flames		Waivers	
October 12, 2023	Samuel Asselin	Bridgeport Islanders (AHL)	1-year	Free agency	

=== Signings ===
Date	Player	Term	Ref
July 5, 2023	Kyle Keyser	1-year	
July 5, 2023	Jakub Lauko	1-year	
July 10, 2023	Ian Mitchell	1-year	
July 11, 2023	Marc McLaughlin	1-year	
July 17, 2023	Michael DiPietro	1-year	
July 17, 2023	Alec Regula	1-year	
July 17, 2023	Reilly Walsh	1-year	
August 1, 2023	Trent Frederic	1-year	
August 1, 2023	Jeremy Swayman	1-year	
August 16, 2023	John Farinacci	2-year†	
October 4, 2023	Frederic Brunet	3-year†	
October 25, 2023	Jackson Edward	3-year†	

== Draft picks ==
Round	#	Player	Pos	Nationality	College/Junior/Club team (League)
3	92	Christopher Pelosi	C	United States	Sioux Falls Stampede (USHL)
4	124	Beckett Hendrickson	C	United States	U.S. NTDP (USHL)
6	188	Ryan Walsh	C	United States	Cedar Rapids RoughRiders (USHL)
7	214	Casper Nassen	RW	Sweden	Västerås IK (J20 Nationell)
7	220	Kristian Kostadinski	D	Sweden	Frölunda HC (J20 Nationell)
