= 2023–24 Anaheim Ducks season =

Anaheim Ducks season

2023–24 Anaheim Ducks
- Division: 7th Pacific
- Conference: 14th Western
- 2023–24 record: 27–50–5
- Home record: 12–26–3
- Road record: 15–24–2
- Goals for: 204
- Goals against: 295

Team information
- General manager: Pat Verbeek
- Coach: Greg Cronin
- Captain: Vacant
- Alternate captains: Cam Fowler; Radko Gudas (Mar–Apr); Adam Henrique (Oct–Mar); Alex Killorn (Apr); Jakob Silfverberg (Nov–Apr); Troy Terry (Oct–Nov); Mason McTavish (Oct)
- Arena: Honda Center
- Average attendance: 15,687
- Minor league affiliates: San Diego Gulls (AHL); Tulsa Oilers (ECHL)

Team leaders
- Goals: Frank Vatrano (37)
- Assists: Cam Fowler; Troy Terry (34)
- Points: Frank Vatrano (60)
- Penalty minutes: Radko Gudas (128)
- Plus/minus: Radko Gudas (+14)
- Wins: Lukas Dostal (14)
- Goals against average: Lukas Dostal (3.33)

The 2023–24 Anaheim Ducks season was the 31st season of operation (30th season of play) for the National Hockey League (NHL) franchise that was established on June 15, 1993.

On June 5, the Ducks hired Greg Cronin, who is the team's 11th head coach in team history. Cronin most recently served as the head coach of the Colorado Avalanche's American Hockey League (AHL) affiliate, the Colorado Eagles before becoming the head coach of the Ducks.

The Ducks' 2022–23 season was disappointing (23–47–12; 58 points), finishing second last to the San Jose Sharks in their division. The Ducks have missed the playoffs since 2018, when they were swept in the first round by the San Jose Sharks. This was the second season the Ducks have entered without a captain.

On March 17, 2024, the Ducks were eliminated from playoff contention for the sixth consecutive season after a 4–2 loss to the St. Louis Blues and the Vegas Golden Knights' 3–1 win against the New Jersey Devils.

== Off-season ==
=== April ===
On April 14, one day after the end of the 2022–23 season, the Ducks announced that head coach Dallas Eakins's contract would not be renewed. In his four seasons with the team, he totaled a record of 100–147–44 record.

== Standings ==
=== Divisional standings ===
Pacific Division
Pos	Team	GP	W	L	OTL	RW	GF	GA	GD	Pts
1	y – Vancouver Canucks	82	50	23	9	44	279	223	+56	109
2	x – Edmonton Oilers	82	49	27	6	39	294	237	+57	104
3	x – Los Angeles Kings	82	44	27	11	37	256	215	+41	99
4	x – Vegas Golden Knights	82	45	29	8	34	267	245	+22	98
5	Calgary Flames	82	38	39	5	32	253	271	−18	81
6	Seattle Kraken	82	34	35	13	28	217	236	−19	81
7	Anaheim Ducks	82	27	50	5	21	204	295	−91	59
8	San Jose Sharks	82	19	54	9	14	181	331	−150	47

Source: National Hockey League
Rules for classification: 1) Fewer number of games played (GP, only during regular season); 2) Greater number of regulation wins (RW); 3) Greater number of wins in regulation and overtime, excluding shootout wins (ROW); 4) Greater number of total wins, including shootouts (W); 5) Greater number of points earned in head-to-head play; if teams played an uneven number of head-to-head games, the result of the first game on the home ice of the team with the extra home game is discarded; 6) Greater goal differential (GD); 7) Greater number of goals scored (GF)
x – Clinched playoff spot; y – Clinched division

=== Conference standings ===
Western Conference Wild Card
Pos	Div	Team	GP	W	L	OTL	RW	GF	GA	GD	Pts
1	CE	x – Nashville Predators	82	47	30	5	38	269	248	+21	99
2	PA	x – Vegas Golden Knights	82	45	29	8	34	267	245	+22	98
3	CE	St. Louis Blues	82	43	33	6	31	239	250	−11	92
4	CE	Minnesota Wild	82	39	34	9	32	251	263	−12	87
5	PA	Calgary Flames	82	38	39	5	32	253	271	−18	81
6	PA	Seattle Kraken	82	34	35	13	28	217	236	−19	81
7	CE	Arizona Coyotes	82	36	41	5	28	256	274	−18	77
8	PA	Anaheim Ducks	82	27	50	5	21	204	295	−91	59
9	CE	Chicago Blackhawks	82	23	53	6	17	179	290	−111	52
10	PA	San Jose Sharks	82	19	54	9	14	181	331	−150	47

Source: National Hockey League
Rules for classification: 1) Fewer number of games played (GP, only during regular season); 2) Greater number of regulation wins (RW); 3) Greater number of wins in regulation and overtime, excluding shootout wins (ROW); 4) Greater number of total wins, including shootouts (W); 5) Greater number of points earned in head-to-head play; if teams played an uneven number of head-to-head games, the result of the first game on the home ice of the team with the extra home game is discarded; 6) Greater goal differential (GD); 7) Greater number of goals scored (GF)
x – Clinched playoff spot

== Schedule and results ==
=== Preseason ===
The Anaheim Ducks preseason schedule was released on June 27, 2023.

2023 preseason game log: 4–4–0 (Home: 2–2–0; Road: 2–2–0)

#	Date	Visitor	Score	Home	OT	Decision	Location	Attendance	Record	Recap
1	September 24	Los Angeles	2–3	Anaheim	OT	Suchanek	Honda Center	12,047	1–0–0	
2	September 26	Anaheim	4–2	San Jose		Stalock	SAP Center	7,448	2–0–0	
3	September 27	San Jose	2–4	Anaheim		Dostal	Honda Center	10,486	3–0–0	
4^{A}	September 29	Los Angeles	4–3	Anaheim		Gibson	Pechanga Arena	11,044	3–1–0	
5^{B}	October 1	Anaheim	5–4	Arizona		Dostal	Acrisure Arena	7,545	4–1–0	
6	October 3	Anaheim	1–4	Los Angeles		Gibson	Crypto.com Arena	12,423	4–2–0	
7	October 5	Arizona	4–2	Anaheim		Gibson	Honda Center	10,878	4–3–0	
8^{C}	October 7	Anaheim	1–7	Arizona		Stalock	TCC Arena	5,180	4–4–0	

Legend:

Win (2 points) Loss (0 points) OT/SO loss (1 point) ^{A} – Game played in San Diego ^{B} – Game played in Thousand Palms ^{C} – Game played in Tucson

=== Regular season ===
The Anaheim Ducks regular season schedule was released on June 27, 2023.

2023–24 game log
October: 5–4–0 (Home: 1–2–0; Road: 4–2–0)

#	Date	Visitor	Score	Home	OT	Decision	Location	Attendance	Record	Points	Recap
1	October 14	Anaheim	1–4	Vegas		Gibson	T-Mobile Arena	18,033	0–1–0	0	
2	October 15	Carolina	3–6	Anaheim		Dostal	Honda Center	17,278	1–1–0	2	
3	October 19	Dallas	3–2	Anaheim		Gibson	Honda Center	14,274	1–2–0	2	
4	October 21	Anaheim	1–2	Arizona		Dostal	Mullett Arena	4,600	1–3–0	2	
5	October 22	Boston	3–1	Anaheim		Gibson	Honda Center	14,264	1–4–0	2	
6	October 24	Anaheim	3–2	Columbus	OT	Dostal	Nationwide Arena	16,432	2–4–0	4	
7	October 26	Anaheim	4–3	Boston	OT	Gibson	TD Garden	17,850	3–4–0	6	
8	October 28	Anaheim	7–4	Philadelphia		Dostal	Wells Fargo Center	18,275	4–4–0	8	
9	October 30	Anaheim	4–3	Pittsburgh		Dostal	PPG Paints Arena	16,903	5–4–0	10	

November: 4–10–0 (Home: 3–7–0; Road: 1–3–0)

#	Date	Visitor	Score	Home	OT	Decision	Location	Attendance	Record	Points	Recap
10	November 1	Arizona	3–4	Anaheim	OT	Dostal	Honda Center	14,894	6–4–0	12	
11	November 5	Vegas	2–4	Anaheim		Gibson	Honda Center	15,720	7–4–0	14	
12	November 7	Pittsburgh	2–0	Anaheim		Gibson	Honda Center	16,043	7–5–0	14	
13	November 10	Philadelphia	6–3	Anaheim		Dostal	Honda Center	15,550	7–6–0	14	
14	November 12	San Jose	1–4	Anaheim		Gibson	Honda Center	16,471	8–6–0	16	
15	November 14	Anaheim	3–2	Nashville		Gibson	Bridgestone Arena	17,159	9–6–0	18	
16	November 15	Anaheim	2–8	Colorado		Dostal	Ball Arena	18,029	9–7–0	18	
17	November 17	Florida	2–1	Anaheim		Gibson	Honda Center	14,932	9–8–0	18	
18	November 19	St. Louis	3–1	Anaheim		Gibson	Honda Center	15,243	9–9–0	18	
19	November 22	Montreal	4–3	Anaheim		Gibson	Honda Center	15,168	9–10–0	18	
20	November 24	Los Angeles	5–2	Anaheim		Gibson	Honda Center	17,205	9–11–0	18	
21	November 26	Anaheim	2–8	Edmonton		Dostal	Rogers Place	17,781	9–12–0	18	
22	November 28	Anaheim	1–3	Vancouver		Gibson	Rogers Arena	18,639	9–13–0	18	
23	November 30	Washington	5–4	Anaheim		Gibson	Honda Center	14,336	9–14–0	18	

December: 4–9–0 (Home: 2–5–0; Road: 2–4–0)

#	Date	Visitor	Score	Home	OT	Decision	Location	Attendance	Record	Points	Recap
24	December 2	Colorado	3–4	Anaheim	SO	Gibson	Honda Center	14,000	10–14–0	20	
25	December 5	Anaheim	2–3	Colorado		Gibson	Ball Arena	18,021	10–15–0	20	
26	December 7	Anaheim	0–1	Chicago		Dostal	United Center	17,424	10–16–0	20	
27	December 10	Winnipeg	4–2	Anaheim		Gibson	Honda Center	13,626	10–17–0	20	
28	December 13	Anaheim	3–4	NY Islanders		Gibson	UBS Arena	14,207	10–18–0	20	
29	December 15	Anaheim	1–5	NY Rangers		Dostal	Madison Square Garden	18,006	10–19–0	20	
30	December 17	Anaheim	5–1	New Jersey		Gibson	Prudential Center	16,514	11–19–0	22	
31	December 18	Anaheim	4–3	Detroit		Dostal	Little Caesars Arena	19,515	12–19–0	24	
32	December 21	Calgary	3–0	Anaheim		Dostal	Honda Center	16,102	12–20–0	24	
33	December 23	Seattle	3–2	Anaheim		Dostal	Honda Center	14,608	12–21–0	24	
34	December 27	Vegas	2–5	Anaheim		Gibson	Honda Center	15,109	13–21–0	26	
35	December 29	Arizona	2–0	Anaheim		Gibson	Honda Center	16,052	13–22–0	26	
36	December 31	Edmonton	7–2	Anaheim		Gibson	Honda Center	16,041	13–23–0	26	

January: 5–7–2 (Home: 2–3–1; Road: 3–4–1)

#	Date	Visitor	Score	Home	OT	Decision	Location	Attendance	Record	Points	Recap
37	January 3	Toronto	2–1	Anaheim	OT	Dostal	Honda Center	16,135	13–23–1	27	
38	January 5	Winnipeg	3–1	Anaheim		Gibson	Honda Center	13,883	13–24–1	27	
39	January 7	Detroit	3–2	Anaheim		Dostal	Honda Center	17,174	13–25–1	27	
40	January 9	Anaheim	5–3	Nashville		Dostal	Bridgestone Arena	17,159	14–25–1	29	
41	January 11	Anaheim	3–6	Carolina		Gibson	PNC Arena	18,748	14–26–1	29	
42	January 13	Anaheim	1–5	Tampa Bay		Dostal	Amalie Arena	19,092	14–27–1	29	
43	January 15	Anaheim	5–4	Florida	OT	Gibson	Amerant Bank Arena	17,885	15–27–1	31	
44	January 16	Anaheim	0–2	Washington		Gibson	Capital One Arena	15,961	15–28–1	31	
45	January 20	Anaheim	3–5	San Jose		Gibson	SAP Center	17,435	15–29–1	31	
46	January 21	NY Rangers	5–2	Anaheim		Dostal	Honda Center	16,197	15–30–1	31	
47	January 23	Buffalo	2–4	Anaheim		Gibson	Honda Center	16,302	16–30–1	33	
48	January 25	Anaheim	3–4	Dallas	OT	Gibson	American Airlines Center	18,532	16–30–2	34	
49	January 27	Anaheim	3–2	Minnesota		Dostal	Xcel Energy Center	19,053	17–30–2	36	
50	January 31	San Jose	2–3	Anaheim	OT	Gibson	Honda Center	15,654	18–30–2	38	

February: 3–5–1 (Home: 0–3–0; Road: 3–2–1)

#	Date	Visitor	Score	Home	OT	Decision	Location	Attendance	Record	Points	Recap
51	February 9	Edmonton	5–3	Anaheim		Dostal	Honda Center	17,489	18–31–2	38	
52	February 13	Anaheim	0–5	Montreal		Dostal	Bell Centre	21,105	18–32–2	38	
53	February 15	Anaheim	5–1	Ottawa		Dostal	Canadian Tire Centre	16,297	19–32–2	40	
54	February 17	Anaheim	2–9	Toronto		Dostal	Scotiabank Arena	19,247	19–33–2	40	
55	February 19	Anaheim	4–3	Buffalo		Gibson	KeyBank Center	17,229	20–33–2	42	
56	February 21	Columbus	7–4	Anaheim		Gibson	Honda Center	14,518	20–34–2	42	
57	February 24	Anaheim	2–3	Los Angeles	SO	Gibson	Crypto.com Arena	18,203	20–34–3	43	
58	February 25	Nashville	4–2	Anaheim		Dostal	Honda Center	16,370	20–35–3	43	
59	February 29	Anaheim	6–4	San Jose		Gibson	SAP Center	10,537	21–35–3	45	

March: 3–12–1 (Home: 3–4–1; Road: 0–8–0)

#	Date	Visitor	Score	Home	OT	Decision	Location	Attendance	Record	Points	Recap
60	March 1	New Jersey	3–4	Anaheim		Dostal	Honda Center	16,078	22–35–3	47	
61	March 3	Vancouver	2–1	Anaheim		Dostal	Honda Center	15,161	22–36–3	47	
62	March 6	Ottawa	1–2	Anaheim		Dostal	Honda Center	16,000	23–36–3	49	
63	March 8	Dallas	6–2	Anaheim		Gibson	Honda Center	16,000	23–37–3	49	
64	March 10	NY Islanders	6–1	Anaheim		Dostal	Honda Center	15,631	23–38–3	49	
65	March 12	Anaheim	2–7	Chicago		Gibson	United Center	18,017	23–39–3	49	
66	March 14	Anaheim	0–2	Minnesota		Dostal	Xcel Energy Center	18,376	23–40–3	49	
67	March 15	Anaheim	0–6	Winnipeg		Gibson	Canada Life Centre	15,225	23–41–3	49	
68	March 17	Anaheim	2–4	St. Louis		Dostal	Enterprise Center	18,096	23–42–3	49	
69	March 19	Minnesota	4–0	Anaheim		Gibson	Honda Center	16,239	23–43–3	49	
70	March 21	Chicago	0–4	Anaheim		Dostal	Honda Center	15,880	24–43–3	51	
71	March 24	Tampa Bay	3–2	Anaheim	OT	Dostal	Honda Center	16,152	24–43–4	52	
72	March 26	Anaheim	0–4	Seattle		Gibson	Climate Pledge Arena	17,151	24–44–4	52	
73	March 28	Anaheim	2–4	Seattle		Dostal	Climate Pledge Arena	17,151	24–45–4	52	
74	March 30	Anaheim	1–6	Edmonton		Gibson	Rogers Place	18,347	24–46–4	52	
75	March 31	Anaheim	2–3	Vancouver		Dostal	Rogers Arena	18,735	24–47–4	52	

April: 3–3–1 (Home: 1–2–1; Road: 2–1–0)

#	Date	Visitor	Score	Home	OT	Decision	Location	Attendance	Record	Points	Recap
76	April 2	Anaheim	5–3	Calgary		Dostal	Scotiabank Saddledome	16,689	25–47–4	54	
77	April 5	Seattle	3–1	Anaheim		Dostal	Honda Center	17,174	25–48–4	54	
78	April 7	St. Louis	6–5	Anaheim	SO	Dostal	Honda Center	16,421	25–48–5	55	
79	April 9	Los Angeles	1–3	Anaheim		Dostal	Honda Center	17,174	26–48–5	57	
80	April 12	Calgary	6–3	Anaheim		Gibson	Honda Center	17,174	26–49–5	57	
81	April 13	Anaheim	1–3	Los Angeles		Dostal	Crypto.com Arena	18,133	26–50–5	57	
82	April 18	Anaheim	4–1	Vegas		Dostal	T-Mobile Arena	18,109	27–50–5	59	

Legend: Win (2 points) Loss (0 points) OT/SO loss (1 point)

== Player stats ==
As of April 18, 2024

=== Skaters ===
Regular season
Player	GP	G	A	Pts	+/−	PIM
Frank Vatrano	82	37	23	60	–20	85
Troy Terry	76	20	34	54	–10	24
Mason McTavish	64	19	23	42	–23	86
Adam Henrique^{‡}	60	18	24	42	+3	33
Ryan Strome	79	11	30	41	–20	86
Cam Fowler	81	5	34	39	−36	24
Alex Killorn	63	18	18	36	−15	54
Leo Carlsson	55	12	17	29	−11	16
Pavel Mintyukov	63	4	24	28	–20	24
Brett Leason	68	11	11	22	−7	14
Jakob Silfverberg	71	7	12	19	+4	24
Radko Gudas	66	6	12	18	+14	128
Jackson LaCombe	71	2	15	17	–24	24
Trevor Zegras	31	6	9	15	–1	30
Max Jones	52	5	10	15	−6	33
Urho Vaakanainen	68	1	13	14	0	26
Sam Carrick^{‡}	61	8	3	11	−11	90
Isac Lundestrom	46	5	6	11	–1	2
Olen Zellweger	26	2	7	9	−6	4
Gustav Lindstrom^{†}	32	0	6	6	+12	18
Jamie Drysdale^{‡}	10	1	4	5	–2	4
Ross Johnston	68	1	3	4	−12	117
Ilya Lyubushkin^{‡}	55	0	4	4	−13	51
Tristan Luneau	7	1	2	3	+1	4
Brock McGinn	24	1	2	3	–5	4
Ben Meyers^{†}	14	0	2	2	–2	6
Benoit-Olivier Groulx	45	0	2	2	–9	22
Sam Colangelo	3	1	0	1	0	2
Nikita Nesterenko	3	1	0	1	0	0
Cutter Gauthier	1	0	1	1	+1	0
Pavol Regenda	5	0	0	0	–1	2
Glenn Gawdin	1	0	0	0	–1	2
William Lagesson^{†}	10	0	0	0	–2	13
Robert Hagg	5	0	0	0	–4	4

=== Goaltenders ===
Regular season
Player	GP	GS	TOI	W	L	OT	GA	GAA	SA	SV%	SO	G	A	PIM
Lukas Dostal	44	38	2,322:49	14	23	3	129	3.33	1,310	.902	1	0	0	8
John Gibson	46	44	2,561:29	13	27	2	151	3.54	1,343	.888	0	0	0	12

^{†}Denotes player spent time with another team before joining the Ducks. Stats reflect time with the Ducks only.
^{‡}Denotes player was traded mid-season. Stats reflect time with the Ducks only.

== Transactions ==
The Ducks have been involved in the following transactions during the 2023–24 season.

=== Key ===
† Contract is entry-level.
‡ Contract initially takes effect in the 2024–25 season.

=== Trades ===
Date	Details		Ref
August 18, 2023	To Buffalo Sabres MIN 4th-round pick in 2025	To Anaheim Ducks Ilya Lyubushkin	
January 8, 2024	To Philadelphia Flyers Jamie Drysdale; 2nd-round pick in 2025	To Anaheim Ducks Rights to Cutter Gauthier	
February 29, 2024	To Carolina Hurricanes TOR 6th-round pick in 2024	To Anaheim Ducks TOR 3rd-round pick in 2025	
February 29, 2024	To Toronto Maple Leafs Ilya Lyubushkin^{1} Rights to Kirill Slepets	To Anaheim Ducks TOR 3rd-round pick in 2025	
March 6, 2024	To Tampa Bay Lightning Adam Henrique^{2}	To Anaheim Ducks Rights to Ty Taylor	
March 6, 2024	To Edmonton Oilers Sam Carrick; Rights to Ty Taylor; ANA 7th-round pick in 2024	To Anaheim Ducks EDM 1st-round pick in 2024; Conditional EDM 5th-round pick 2025^{3}	
March 6, 2024	To Colorado Avalanche 5th-round pick in 2024	To Anaheim Ducks Ben Meyers	
June 28, 2024	To Toronto Maple Leafs 1st-round pick in 2024; BOS 2nd-round pick in 2024	To Anaheim Ducks 1st-round pick in 2024	
June 29, 2024	To Los Angeles Kings 6th-round pick in 2024	To Anaheim Ducks 6th-round pick in 2024; 7th-round pick in 2024	

==== Notes ====
1. Anaheim retains 50% and Carolina 25% of Lyubushkin's remaining contract.
2. Anaheim retains 50% of Henrique's remaining contract.
3. Anaheim retains 50% of Carrick's remaining contract. The 5th-round pick will become Edmonton's 4th-round pick if the Oilers win the 2024 Stanley Cup.

=== Players acquired ===
Date	Player	Former team	Term	Via	Ref
July 1, 2023	Trevor Carrick	Tampa Bay Lightning	1-year	Free agency	
July 1, 2023	Radko Gudas	Florida Panthers	3-year	Free agency	
July 1, 2023	Alex Killorn	Tampa Bay Lightning	4-year	Free agency	
July 4, 2023	Robert Hagg	Detroit Red Wings	1-year	Free agency	
August 7, 2023	Alex Stalock	Chicago Blackhawks	1-year	Free agency	
October 1, 2023	Lassi Thomson	Ottawa Senators		Waivers	
October 10, 2023	Ross Johnston	New York Islanders		Waivers	
January 10, 2024	Gustav Lindstrom	Montreal Canadiens		Waivers	
March 8, 2024	William Lagesson	Toronto Maple Leafs		Waivers	

=== Players lost ===
Date	Player	New team	Term	Via	Ref
July 1, 2023	Jayson Megna	Boston Bruins	1-year	Free agency	
July 1, 2023	Kevin Shattenkirk	Boston Bruins	1-year	Free agency	
July 2, 2023	Anthony Stolarz	Florida Panthers	1-year	Free agency	
July 5, 2023	Chase Priskie	Washington Capitals	1-year	Free agency	
July 9, 2023	Josiah Slavin	Toronto Marlies (AHL)	1-year	Free agency	
July 10, 2023	Andrej Sustr	Kölner Haie (DEL)	1-year	Free agency	
July 16, 2023	Justin Kirkland	Arizona Coyotes	1-year	Free agency	
July 20, 2023	Derek Grant	ZSC Lions (NL)	1-year	Free agency	
August 21, 2023	Bryce Kindopp	Rockford IceHogs (AHL)	1-year	Free agency	
August 28, 2023	Simon Benoit	Toronto Maple Leafs	1-year	Free agency	
September 6, 2023	Dylan Sikura	Skellefteå AIK (SHL)	1-year	Free agency	
October 1, 2023	Lassi Thomson	Ottawa Senators		Waivers	
October 5, 2023	Olli Juolevi	Timrå IK (SHL)	1-year	Free agency	
October 16, 2023	Max Comtois	Chicago Wolves (AHL)	1-year	Free agency	
October 17, 2023	Scott Harrington	ZSC Lions (NL)	1-year	Free agency	
April 15, 2024	Jakob Silfverberg	Brynäs IF (SHL)	2-year	Free agency	

=== Retirement ===
Date	Player	Ref
September 6, 2023	Michael Del Zotto	

=== Signings ===
Date	Player	Term	Ref
July 12, 2023	Leo Carlsson	3-year†	
July 14, 2023	Benoit-Olivier Groulx	1-year	
July 16, 2023	Lukas Dostal	2-year	
July 19, 2023	Noah Warren	3-year†	
August 2, 2023	Troy Terry	7-year	
September 5, 2023	Tristan Luneau	3-year†	
October 2, 2023	Trevor Zegras	3-year	
October 5, 2023	Jamie Drysdale	3-year	
March 21, 2024	Tomas Suchanek	3-year†‡	
March 29, 2024	Nico Myatovic	3-year†‡	
April 3, 2024	Yegor Sidorov	3-year†‡	
April 3, 2024	Coulson Pitre	3-year†‡	
April 11, 2024	Sam Colangelo	2-year†	
April 15, 2024	Cutter Gauthier	3-year†	
May 1, 2024	Vyacheslav Buteyets	2-year†‡	
May 18, 2024	Rodwin Dionicio	3-year†‡	
June 3, 2024	Damian Clara	3-year†‡	

== Draft picks ==
Below are the Anaheim Ducks selections at the 2023 NHL entry draft, which was held on June 28 and 29, 2023, at Bridgestone Arena in Nashville, Tennessee.

Round	#	Player	Pos	Nationality	College/Junior/Club team (League)
1	2	Leo Carlsson	C	Sweden	Örebro HK (SHL)
2	33	Nico Myatovic	LW	Canada	Seattle Thunderbirds (WHL)
2	59 (Note: The Colorado Avalanche's second-round pick will go to the Anaheim Ducks as the result of a trade on March 14, 2022, that sent Josh Manson to Colorado in exchange for Drew Helleson and this pick.)	Carey Terrance	C	United States	Erie Otters (OHL)
2	60 (Note: The Boston Bruins' second-round pick will go to the Anaheim Ducks as the result of a trade on March 19, 2022, that sent Hampus Lindholm and Kodie Curran to Boston in exchange for Urho Vaakanainen, John Moore, a first-round pick in 2022, a second-round pick in 2024 and this pick.)	Damian Clara	G	Italy	Färjestad BK (J20 Nationell)
3	65	Coulson Pitre	RW	Canada	Flint Firebirds (OHL)
3	85 (Note: The Minnesota Wild's third-round pick will go to the Anaheim Ducks as the result of a trade on March 19, 2022, that sent Nicolas Deslauriers to Minnesota in exchange for this pick.)	Yegor Sidorov	RW	Belarus	Saskatoon Blades (WHL)
4	97	Konnor Smith	D	Canada	Peterborough Petes (OHL)
5	129	Rodwin Dionicio	D	Switzerland	Windsor Spitfires (OHL)
6	161	Vojtech Port	D	Czechia	Edmonton Oil Kings (WHL)
