= 2023–24 Pittsburgh Penguins season =

National Hockey League season

2023–24 Pittsburgh Penguins
- Division: 5th Metropolitan
- Conference: 10th Eastern
- 2023–24 record: 38–32–12
- Home record: 23–14–4
- Road record: 15–18–8
- Goals for: 255
- Goals against: 251

Team information
- General manager: Kyle Dubas
- Coach: Mike Sullivan
- Captain: Sidney Crosby
- Alternate captains: Kris Letang; Evgeni Malkin
- Arena: PPG Paints Arena
- Average attendance: 17,909
- Minor league affiliates: Wilkes-Barre/Scranton Penguins (AHL); Wheeling Nailers (ECHL)

Team leaders
- Goals: Sidney Crosby (42)
- Assists: Sidney Crosby (52)
- Points: Sidney Crosby (94)
- Penalty minutes: Evgeni Malkin (70)
- Plus/minus: Marcus Pettersson (+28)
- Wins: Tristan Jarry (19)
- Goals against average: Magnus Hellberg (2.50)

The 2023–24 Pittsburgh Penguins season was the 57th season (56th season of play) for the National Hockey League (NHL) franchise that was established on June 5, 1967.

On June 1, 2023, Kyle Dubas was hired as president of hockey operations and general manager of the Penguins, replacing Brian Burke.

The Penguins were attempting to make the playoffs for the 17th time in 18 years after missing the postseason for the first time since 2006, and ending the longest active playoff appearance streak among the four major North American sports leagues at 16 years. The old Pittsburgh Penguins spot for being the longest active playoffs streak was taken by the Los Angeles Dodgers of Major League Baseball (MLB) who made the playoffs for 10 consecutive years. They were attempting to win the team's sixth Stanley Cup in franchise history and their first since 2017. This is the first season since 2012–13 that Brian Dumoulin is not on the roster, as he went to the Seattle Kraken. Also with MLB's 2023 St. Louis Cardinals having a losing season for the first time since 2007, the Penguins entered the season taking the Cardinals' spot for the third-longest consecutive non-losing season last having a losing season in 2006.

With a win against the Nashville Predators on April 15, 2024, the following night saw the Penguins needing losses by the Detroit Red Wings and Washington Capitals in order to clinch a spot in the playoffs. However, the Penguins were eliminated from playoff contention for the second consecutive season for the first time since the 2003–04 season and the 2005–06 season after the Red Wings defeated the Montreal Canadiens in overtime while the Capitals defeated the Philadelphia Flyers, clinching the final spot as the wild card.

== Standings ==
=== Divisional standings ===
Metropolitan Division
Pos	Team	GP	W	L	OTL	RW	GF	GA	GD	Pts
1	p – New York Rangers	82	55	23	4	43	282	229	+53	114
2	x – Carolina Hurricanes	82	52	23	7	44	279	216	+63	111
3	x – New York Islanders	82	39	27	16	29	246	263	−17	94
4	x – Washington Capitals	82	40	31	11	32	220	257	−37	91
5	Pittsburgh Penguins	82	38	32	12	32	255	251	+4	88
6	Philadelphia Flyers	82	38	33	11	30	235	261	−26	87
7	New Jersey Devils	82	38	39	5	33	264	283	−19	81
8	Columbus Blue Jackets	82	27	43	12	21	237	300	−63	66

Source: National Hockey League
Rules for classification: 1) Fewer number of games played (GP, only during regular season); 2) Greater number of regulation wins (RW); 3) Greater number of wins in regulation and overtime, excluding shootout wins (ROW); 4) Greater number of total wins, including shootouts (W); 5) Greater number of points earned in head-to-head play; if teams played an uneven number of head-to-head games, the result of the first game on the home ice of the team with the extra home game is discarded; 6) Greater goal differential (GD); 7) Greater number of goals scored (GF)
p – Clinched Presidents' Trophy; x – Clinched playoff spot

=== Conference standings ===
Eastern Conference Wild Card
Pos	Div	Team	GP	W	L	OTL	RW	GF	GA	GD	Pts
1	AT	x – Tampa Bay Lightning	82	45	29	8	37	291	268	+23	98
2	ME	x – Washington Capitals	82	40	31	11	32	220	257	−37	91
3	AT	Detroit Red Wings	82	41	32	9	27	278	274	+4	91
4	ME	Pittsburgh Penguins	82	38	32	12	32	255	251	+4	88
5	ME	Philadelphia Flyers	82	38	33	11	30	235	261	−26	87
6	AT	Buffalo Sabres	82	39	37	6	33	246	244	+2	84
7	ME	New Jersey Devils	82	38	39	5	33	264	283	−19	81
8	AT	Ottawa Senators	82	37	41	4	25	255	281	−26	78
9	AT	Montreal Canadiens	82	30	36	16	20	236	289	−53	76
10	ME	Columbus Blue Jackets	82	27	43	12	21	237	300	−63	66

Source: National Hockey League
Rules for classification: 1) Fewer number of games played (GP, only during regular season); 2) Greater number of regulation wins (RW); 3) Greater number of wins in regulation and overtime, excluding shootout wins (ROW); 4) Greater number of total wins, including shootouts (W); 5) Greater number of points earned in head-to-head play; if teams played an uneven number of head-to-head games, the result of the first game on the home ice of the team with the extra home game is discarded; 6) Greater goal differential (GD); 7) Greater number of goals scored (GF)
x – Clinched playoff spot

== Schedule and results ==
=== Preseason ===
The Preseason schedule was released on June 23, 2023.

2023 preseason game log: 3–3–1 (Home: 2–2–0; Road: 1–1–1)

#	Date	Visitor	Score	OT	Home	Location	Attendance	Record
1^{A}	September 24	Columbus	2–3	SO	Pittsburgh	PPG Paints Arena	13,341	1–0–0
2^{A}	September 24	Pittsburgh	3–4	OT	Columbus	Nationwide Arena	13,255	1–0–1
3	September 26	Pittsburgh	3–4		Detroit	Little Caesars Arena	7,991	1–1–1
4	September 28	Buffalo	1–3		Pittsburgh	PPG Paints Arena	13,939	2–1–1
5^{B}	October 2	Ottawa	3–0		Pittsburgh	Scotiabank Centre	10,595	2–2–1
6	October 4	Detroit	2–1		Pittsburgh	PPG Paints Arena	13,957	2–3–1
7	October 6	Pittsburgh	7–4		Buffalo	KeyBank Center	14,875	3–3–1

Legend

Win Loss OT/SO Loss ^{A} – split squad ^{B} – game played in Nova Scotia, Canada

=== Regular season ===
The Pittsburgh Penguins regular season schedule was released on June 27, 2023.

2023–24 game log
October: 3–6–0 (Home: 2–4–0; Road: 1–2–0)

#	Date	Visitor	Score	Home	OT	Arena	Attendance	Record	Points
1	October 10	Chicago Blackhawks	4–2	Pittsburgh Penguins		PPG Paints Arena	18,411	0–1–0	0
2	October 13	Pittsburgh Penguins	4–0	Washington Capitals		Capital One Arena	18,573	1–1–0	2
3	October 14	Calgary Flames	2–5	Pittsburgh Penguins		PPG Paints Arena	17,635	2–1–0	4
4	October 18	Pittsburgh Penguins	3–6	Detroit Red Wings		Little Caesars Arena	18,895	2–2–0	4
5	October 21	Pittsburgh Penguins	2–4	St. Louis Blues		Enterprise Center	18,096	2–3–0	4
6	October 24	Dallas Stars	4–1	Pittsburgh Penguins		PPG Paints Arena	17,209	2–4–0	4
7	October 26	Colorado Avalanche	0–4	Pittsburgh Penguins		PPG Paints Arena	17,154	3–4–0	6
8	October 28	Ottawa Senators	5–2	Pittsburgh Penguins		PPG Paints Arena	17,631	3–5–0	6
9	October 30	Anaheim Ducks	4–3	Pittsburgh Penguins		PPG Paints Arena	16,903	3–6–0	6

November: 8–4–1 (Home: 3–2–0; Road: 5–2–1)

#	Date	Visitor	Score	Home	OT	Arena	Attendance	Record	Points
10	November 4	Pittsburgh Penguins	10–2	San Jose Sharks		SAP Center at San Jose	17,435	4–6–0	8
11	November 7	Pittsburgh Penguins	2–0	Anaheim Ducks		Honda Center	16,043	5–6–0	10
12	November 9	Pittsburgh Penguins	4–3	Los Angeles Kings	OT	Crypto.com Arena	18,145	6–6–0	12
13	November 11	Buffalo Sabres	0–4	Pittsburgh Penguins		PPG Paints Arena	18,429	7–6–0	14
14	November 14	Pittsburgh Penguins	5–3	Columbus Blue Jackets		Nationwide Arena	16,596	8–6–0	16
15	November 16	New Jersey Devils	5–2	Pittsburgh Penguins		PPG Paints Arena	18,321	8–7–0	16
16	November 18	Pittsburgh Penguins	2–4	Carolina Hurricanes		PNC Arena	18,700	8–8–0	16
17	November 19	Vegas Golden Knights	0–3	Pittsburgh Penguins		PPG Paints Arena	18,120	9–8–0	18
18	November 22	New York Rangers	1–0	Pittsburgh Penguins		PPG Paints Arena	18,250	9–9–0	18
19	November 24	Pittsburgh Penguins	2–3	Buffalo Sabres		KeyBank Center	19,070	9–10–0	18
20	November 25	Toronto Maple Leafs	2–3	Pittsburgh Penguins		PPG Paints Arena	18,229	10–10–0	20
21	November 28	Pittsburgh Penguins	2–3	Nashville Predators	OT	Bridgestone Arena	17,159	10–10–1	21
22	November 30	Pittsburgh Penguins	4–2	Tampa Bay Lightning		Amalie Arena	19,092	11–10–1	23

December: 7–3–3 (Home: 5–0–1; Road: 2–3–2)

#	Date	Visitor	Score	Home	OT	Arena	Attendance	Record	Points
23	December 2	Philadelphia Flyers	4–3	Pittsburgh Penguins	SO	PPG Paints Arena	18,303	11–10–2	24
24	December 4	Pittsburgh Penguins	1–2	Philadelphia Flyers	OT	Wells Fargo Center	18,084	11–10–3	25
25	December 6	Pittsburgh Penguins	1–3	Tampa Bay Lightning		Amalie Arena	19,092	11–11–3	25
26	December 8	Pittsburgh Penguins	1–3	Florida Panthers		Amerant Bank Arena	18,640	11–12–3	25
27	December 12	Arizona Coyotes	2–4	Pittsburgh Penguins		PPG Paints Arena	17,068	12–12–3	27
28	December 13	Pittsburgh Penguins	4–3	Montreal Canadiens	SO	Bell Centre	21,105	13–12–3	29
29	December 16	Pittsburgh Penguins	0–7	Toronto Maple Leafs		Scotiabank Arena	18,921	13–13–3	29
30	December 18	Minnesota Wild	3–4	Pittsburgh Penguins		PPG Paints Arena	18,200	14–13–3	31
31	December 21	Carolina Hurricanes	1–2	Pittsburgh Penguins	SO	PPG Paints Arena	18,267	15–13–3	33
32	December 23	Pittsburgh Penguins	4–5	Ottawa Senators	OT	Canadian Tire Centre	19,286	15–13–4	34
33	December 27	Pittsburgh Penguins	7–0	New York Islanders		UBS Arena	17,255	16–13–4	36
34	December 30	St. Louis Blues	2–4	Pittsburgh Penguins		PPG Paints Arena	18,321	17–13–4	38
35	December 31	New York Islanders	1–3	Pittsburgh Penguins		PPG Paints Arena	18,216	18–13–4	40

January: 4–4–3 (Home: 2–2–2; Road: 2–2–1)

#	Date	Visitor	Score	Home	OT	Arena	Attendance	Record	Points
36	January 2	Washington Capitals	4–3	Pittsburgh Penguins		PPG Paints Arena	18,190	18–14–4	40
37	January 4	Pittsburgh Penguins	6–5	Boston Bruins		TD Garden	17,850	19–14–4	42
38	January 6	Buffalo Sabres	3–1	Pittsburgh Penguins		PPG Paints Arena	18,256	19–15–4	42
39	January 8	Pittsburgh Penguins	4–1	Philadelphia Flyers		Wells Fargo Center	18,279	20–15–4	44
40	January 11	Vancouver Canucks	4–3	Pittsburgh Penguins	OT	PPG Paints Arena	18,190	20–15–5	45
41	January 13	Pittsburgh Penguins	2–3	Carolina Hurricanes	OT	PNC Arena	18,932	20–15–6	46
42	January 15	Seattle Kraken	0–3	Pittsburgh Penguins		PPG Paints Arena	18,202	21–15–6	48
43	January 20	Pittsburgh Penguins	2–3	Vegas Golden Knights		T-Mobile Arena	18,319	21–16–6	48
44	January 22	Pittsburgh Penguins	2–5	Arizona Coyotes		Mullett Arena	4,600	21–17–6	48
45	January 26	Florida Panthers	3–2	Pittsburgh Penguins	SO	PPG Paints Arena	18,188	21–17–7	49
46	January 27	Montreal Canadiens	2–3	Pittsburgh Penguins	OT	PPG Paints Arena	18,377	22–17–7	51

February: 5–5–1 (Home: 3–2–1; Road: 2–3–0)

#	Date	Visitor	Score	Home	OT	Arena	Attendance	Record	Points
47	February 6	Winnipeg Jets	0–3	Pittsburgh Penguins		PPG Paints Arena	17,086	23–17–7	53
48	February 9	Pittsburgh Penguins	2–3	Minnesota Wild		Xcel Energy Center	19,329	23–18–7	53
49	February 10	Pittsburgh Penguins	1–2	Winnipeg Jets		Canada Life Centre	15,225	23–19–7	53
50	February 14	Florida Panthers	5–2	Pittsburgh Penguins		PPG Paints Arena	17,967	23–20–7	53
51	February 15	Pittsburgh Penguins	4–1	Chicago Blackhawks		United Center	19,423	24–20–7	55
52	February 18	Los Angeles Kings	2–1	Pittsburgh Penguins		PPG Paints Arena	18,422	24–21–7	55
53	February 20	New York Islanders	5–4	Pittsburgh Penguins	OT	PPG Paints Arena	18,016	24–21–8	56
54	February 22	Montreal Canadiens	1–4	Pittsburgh Penguins		PPG Paints Arena	17,160	25–21–8	58
55	February 25	Philadelphia Flyers	6–7	Pittsburgh Penguins		PPG Paints Arena	18,212	26–21–8	60
56	February 27	Pittsburgh Penguins	4–3	Vancouver Canucks	OT	Rogers Arena	18,730	27–21–8	62
57	February 29	Pittsburgh Penguins	0–2	Seattle Kraken		Climate Pledge Arena	17,151	27–22–8	62

March: 5–8–2 (Home: 5–3–0; Road: 0–5–2)

#	Date	Visitor	Score	Home	OT	Arena	Attendance	Record	Points
58	March 2	Pittsburgh Penguins	3–4	Calgary Flames		Scotiabank Saddledome	19,289	27–23–8	62
59	March 3	Pittsburgh Penguins	1–6	Edmonton Oilers		Rogers Place	18,347	27–24–8	62
60	March 5	Columbus Blue Jackets	3–5	Pittsburgh Penguins		PPG Paints Arena	17,072	28–24–8	64
61	March 7	Washington Capitals	6–0	Pittsburgh Penguins		PPG Paints Arena	17,093	28–25–8	64
62	March 9	Pittsburgh Penguins	1–5	Boston Bruins		TD Garden	17,850	28–26–8	64
63	March 10	Edmonton Oilers	4–0	Pittsburgh Penguins		PPG Paints Arena	17,753	28–27–8	64
64	March 12	Pittsburgh Penguins	1–2	Ottawa Senators	OT	Canadian Tire Centre	19,236	28–27–9	65
65	March 14	San Jose Sharks	3–6	Pittsburgh Penguins		PPG Paints Arena	17,027	29–27–9	67
66	March 16	New York Rangers	7–4	Pittsburgh Penguins		PPG Paints Arena	17,811	29–28–9	67
67	March 17	Detroit Red Wings	3–6	Pittsburgh Penguins		PPG Paints Arena	17,191	30–28–9	69
68	March 19	Pittsburgh Penguins	2–5	New Jersey Devils		Prudential Center	15,605	30–29–9	69
69	March 22	Pittsburgh Penguins	2–4	Dallas Stars		American Airlines Center	18,532	30–30–9	69
70	March 24	Pittsburgh Penguins	4–5	Colorado Avalanche	OT	Ball Arena	18,129	30–30–10	70
71	March 26	Carolina Hurricanes	1–4	Pittsburgh Penguins		PPG Paints Arena	17,913	31–30–10	72
72	March 28	Columbus Blue Jackets	2–3	Pittsburgh Penguins		PPG Paints Arena	18,191	32–30–10	74
73	March 30	Pittsburgh Penguins	3–4	Columbus Blue Jackets	SO	Nationwide Arena	18,873	32–30–11	75

April: 6–2–1 (Home: 3–1–0; Road: 3–1–1)

#	Date	Visitor	Score	Home	OT	Arena	Attendance	Record	Points
74	April 1	Pittsburgh Penguins	5–2	New York Rangers		Madison Square Garden	18,006	33–30–11	77
75	April 2	Pittsburgh Penguins	6–3	New Jersey Devils		Prudential Center	16,514	34–30–11	79
76	April 4	Pittsburgh Penguins	4–1	Washington Capitals		Capital One Arena	18,573	35–30–11	81
77	April 6	Tampa Bay Lightning	4–5	Pittsburgh Penguins		PPG Paints Arena	18,383	36–30–11	83
78	April 8	Pittsburgh Penguins	2–3	Toronto Maple Leafs	OT	Scotiabank Arena	18,441	36–30–12	84
79	April 11	Detroit Red Wings	5–6	Pittsburgh Penguins	OT	PPG Paints Arena	18,294	37–30–12	86
80	April 13	Boston Bruins	6–4	Pittsburgh Penguins		PPG Paints Arena	18,393	37–31–12	86
81	April 15	Nashville Predators	2–4	Pittsburgh Penguins		PPG Paints Arena	18,198	38–31–12	88
82	April 17	Pittsburgh Penguins	4–5	New York Islanders		UBS Arena	17,255	38–32–12	88

Legend: Win (2 points) Loss (0 points) Overtime/shootout loss (1 point)

== Player statistics ==
As of April 17, 2024

=== Skaters ===
Regular season
Player	GP	G	A	Pts	+/−	PIM
Sidney Crosby	82	42	52	94	+7	40
Evgeni Malkin	82	27	40	67	+5	70
Bryan Rust	62	28	28	56	+10	20
Erik Karlsson	82	11	45	56	+4	44
Jake Guentzel^{‡}	50	22	30	52	+9	14
Kris Letang	82	10	41	51	+13	62
Reilly Smith	76	13	27	40	+3	18
Rickard Rakell	70	15	22	37	+4	22
Drew O'Connor	79	16	17	33	+14	20
Lars Eller	82	15	16	31	–1	32
Marcus Pettersson	82	4	26	30	+28	44
Valtteri Puustinen	52	5	15	20	+4	6
Michael Bunting^{†}	21	6	13	19	−4	2
Jeff Carter	72	11	4	15	−7	12
Ryan Graves	70	3	11	14	+10	30
Pierre-Olivier Joseph	52	2	9	11	−3	14
Radim Zohorna	33	4	3	7	0	18
Noel Acciari	55	4	3	7	−7	10
John Ludvig	33	3	2	5	−12	47
Emil Bemstrom^{†}	24	3	2	5	0	2
Jesse Puljujarvi	22	3	1	4	+2	6
Chad Ruhwedel^{‡}	47	1	3	4	−4	21
Matt Nieto	22	1	3	4	+5	4
Jansen Harkins	45	0	4	4	−4	21
Vinnie Hinostroza	14	1	2	3	−3	4
Jonathan Gruden	13	1	0	1	−2	5
Ryan Shea	31	1	0	1	+1	6
Jack St. Ivany	14	0	1	1	0	2
Marc Johnstone	1	0	0	0	−1	0
Sam Poulin	3	0	0	0	−1	2
Matthew Phillips^{†}	3	0	0	0	0	0
Joona Koppanen	4	0	0	0	0	0
Colin White	11	0	0	0	−2	2
Alexander Nylander^{‡}	5	0	0	0	0	0

=== Goaltenders ===
Playoffs
Player	GP	GS	TOI	W	L	OT	GA	GAA	SA	SV%	SO	G	A	PIM
Tristan Jarry	51	48	2,740:38	19	25	5	133	2.91	1,369	.903	6	1	0	4
Alex Nedeljkovic	38	33	2,060:01	18	7	7	102	2.97	1,039	.902	1	0	0	0
Magnus Hellberg	3	1	119:53	1	0	0	5	2.50	64	.922	0	0	0	0

^{†}Denotes player spent time with another team before joining the Penguins. Stats reflect time with the Penguins only.
^{‡}Denotes player was traded mid-season. Stats reflect time with the Penguins only.

== Transactions ==
The Penguins have been involved in the following transactions during the 2023–24 season.

Key:

† Contract is entry-level.
‡ Contract initially takes effect in the 2024–25 season.

=== Trades ===
Date	Details		Ref
June 28, 2023	To Vegas Golden Knights 3rd-round pick in 2024	To Pittsburgh Penguins Reilly Smith	
June 29, 2023	To Vegas Golden Knights CGY 3rd-round pick in 2023	To Pittsburgh Penguins COL 3rd-round pick in 2023; 7th-round pick in 2024	
August 6, 2023	To Montreal Canadiens Casey DeSmith; Nathan Legare; Jeff Petry*; 2nd-round pick in 2025	To Pittsburgh Penguins Mike Hoffman; Rem Pitlick	
August 6, 2023	To San Jose Sharks Mikael Granlund; Mike Hoffman; Jan Rutta conditional 1st-round pick in 2024 or 1st-round pick in 2025	To Pittsburgh Penguins Dillon Hamaliuk; Erik Karlsson*; 3rd-round pick in 2026	
January 6, 2024	To Chicago Blackhawks Rem Pitlick	To Pittsburgh Penguins Conditional CHI 7th-round pick in 2026	
January 25, 2024	To Minnesota Wild Will Butcher	To Pittsburgh Penguins Maxim Cajkovic	
February 22, 2024	To Columbus Blue Jackets Alexander Nylander; Conditional 6th-round pick in 2026	To Pittsburgh Penguins Emil Bemstrom	
March 7, 2024	To Carolina Hurricanes Jake Guentzel; Ty Smith	To Pittsburgh Penguins Michael Bunting; Ville Koivunen; Vasily Ponomarev; Cruz Lucius; Conditional 1st-round pick in 2024; Conditional 5th-round pick in 2024	
March 8, 2024	To New York Rangers Chad Ruhwedel	To Pittsburgh Penguins 4th-round pick in 2024	

=== Players acquired ===
Date	Player	Former team	Term	Via	Ref
July 1, 2023	Noel Acciari	Toronto Maple Leafs	3-year	Free agency	
July 1, 2023	Lars Eller	Colorado Avalanche	2-year	Free agency	
July 1, 2023	Ryan Graves	New Jersey Devils	6-year	Free agency	
July 1, 2023	Joona Koppanen	Boston Bruins	2-year	Free agency	
July 1, 2023	Alex Nedeljkovic	Detroit Red Wings	1-year	Free agency	
July 1, 2023	Matt Nieto	Colorado Avalanche	2-year	Free agency	
July 1, 2023	Ryan Shea	Dallas Stars	1-year	Free agency	
July 2, 2023	Magnus Hellberg	Detroit Red Wings	1-year	Free agency	
July 2, 2023	Marc Johnstone	Toronto Marlies (AHL)	2-year	Free agency	
July 2, 2023	Radim Zohorna	Toronto Maple Leafs	1-year	Free agency	
July 3, 2023	Will Butcher	Dallas Stars	1-year	Free agency	
July 7, 2023	Vinnie Hinostroza	Buffalo Sabres	1-year	Free agency	
July 7, 2023	Andreas Johnsson	San Jose Sharks	1-year	Free agency	
October 7, 2023	Colin White	Florida Panthers	1-year	Free agency	
November 21, 2023	Dmitri Samorukov	St. Louis Blues	1-year	Free agency	
February 16, 2024	Matthew Phillips	Washington Capitals		Waivers	
May 21, 2024	Filip Kral	Lahti Pelicans (Liiga)	1-year	Free agency	

=== Players lost ===
Date	Player	New team	Term	Via	Ref
July 1, 2023	Josh Archibald	Tampa Bay Lightning	2-year	Free agency	
July 1, 2023	Nick Bonino	New York Rangers	1-year	Free agency	
July 1, 2023	Drake Caggiula	Edmonton Oilers	2-year	Free agency	
July 1, 2023	Brian Dumoulin	Seattle Kraken	2-year	Free agency	
July 1, 2023	Dmitry Kulikov	Florida Panthers	1-year	Free agency	
July 1, 2023	Ryan Poehling	Philadelphia Flyers	1-year	Free agency	
July 1, 2023	Dustin Tokarski	Buffalo Sabres	1-year	Free agency	
July 1, 2023	Jason Zucker	Arizona Coyotes	1-year	Free agency	
July 11, 2023	Josh Maniscalco	Rockford IceHogs (AHL)	1-year	Free agency	
August 2, 2023	Colin Swoyer	Hershey Bears (AHL)	1-year	Free agency	
November 8, 2023	Andreas Johnsson			Contract termination	
February 22, 2024	Colin White	Montreal Canadiens		Waivers	

=== Signings ===
Date	Player	Term	Ref
July 1, 2023	Tristan Jarry	5-year	
July 14, 2023	Jonathan Gruden	1-year	
July 14, 2023	Emil Pieniniemi	3-year†	
July 15, 2023	Ty Smith	1-year	
August 2, 2023	Drew O'Connor	1-year	
February 4, 2024	Jesse Puljujarvi	2-year	
April 20, 2024	Tristan Broz	3-year†	
April 29, 2023	Filip Larsson	2-year	
April 29, 2023	Sam Poulin	2-year	
May 10, 2024	Valtteri Puustinen	2-year	
May 21, 2023	Jonathan Gruden	2-year	
May 21, 2023	Jack St. Ivany	3-year	
June 20, 2024	Alex Nedeljkovic	2-year	

== Draft Picks ==
Below are the Pittsburgh Penguins selections at the 2023 NHL entry draft, which was held on June 28 and 29, 2023, at Bridgestone Arena in Nashville, Tennessee.

Round	#	Player	Pos	Nationality	College/Junior/Club team (League)
1	14	Brayden Yager	C	Canada	Moose Jaw Warriors (WHL)
3	91	Emil Pieniniemi	D	Finland	Oulun Kärpät (U20 SM-sarja)
5	142	Mikhail Ilyin	C	Russia	Severstal Cherepovets (KHL)
6	174	Cooper Foster	C	Canada	Ottawa 67's (OHL)
7	217	Emil Jarventie	LW	Finland	SaiPa (Liiga)
7	223	Kalle Kangas	D	Finland	Jokerit (U20 SM-sarja)
