= 2023–24 Toronto Maple Leafs season =

National Hockey League season

2023–24 Toronto Maple Leafs
- Division: 3rd Atlantic
- Conference: 5th Eastern
- 2023–24 record: 46–26–10
- Home record: 22–15–4
- Road record: 24–11–6
- Goals for: 303
- Goals against: 263

Team information
- General manager: Brad Treliving
- Coach: Sheldon Keefe
- Captain: John Tavares
- Alternate captains: Mitch Marner; Auston Matthews; Morgan Rielly
- Arena: Scotiabank Arena
- Average attendance: 18,789
- Minor league affiliates: Toronto Marlies (AHL); Newfoundland Growlers (ECHL) (Oct. 11 – Apr. 2)

Team leaders
- Goals: Auston Matthews (69)
- Assists: Mitch Marner (59)
- Points: Auston Matthews (107)
- Penalty minutes: Max Domi (118)
- Plus/minus: Auston Matthews (+31)
- Wins: Ilya Samsonov (23)
- Goals against average: Martin Jones (2.87)

The 2023–24 Toronto Maple Leafs season was the franchise's 107th season (106th season of play) in the National Hockey League (NHL). Since the Pittsburgh Penguins missed the playoffs for the first time since 2006 along with the Washington Capitals and the Nashville Predators also missing the playoffs for the first time since 2014, both they and their rival, the Boston Bruins, are tied for the longest active playoff streak with both making the playoffs every year since 2017 (Toronto took possession of the record the next season when Boston finished second-last in the conference). The Maple Leafs played two games in Stockholm at the Avicii Arena on November 17 and 19 as part of the NHL Global Series.

Brad Treliving was named general manager on May 31, 2023, after the team parted ways with Kyle Dubas at the end of the 2022–23 season.

During the off season, the Leafs were predicted to win the Atlantic Division; however, they never lived up to that promise. The team got off to a slow start, with a record of 5-3-1 in October. Throughout the season goaltending and the defense were persistent issues, with the team allowing 263 goals against, the most since the 2011–12 season. This was especially the case on December 21, 2023 when the Leafs lost 9-3 to the Buffalo Sabres - the most goals the team had allowed in a game since November 18, 2014. The Leafs had three separate four-game losing streaks: the first in October and November, the second was in January witch put the team in danger of missing the playoffs for the first time since the 2015–16 season. and the third was in April. One bright spot was Auston Matthews, who scored 69 goals to tie Mario Lemieux for the most goals since 1993. On February 10, 2024, during a game against the Ottawa Senators, defenceman Morgan Reilly cross checked Ridly Greig in the face after Greig took a slapshot into an empty net. The Leafs finished with 102 points, 8 points behind the division winner, and eventual Stanley cup champion, Florida Panthers who recorded 110 points.

On April 5, 2024, the Maple Leafs clinched a playoff spot for the eighth consecutive season, after losses by the Detroit Red Wings, Philadelphia Flyers and Washington Capitals. In the playoffs, the Leafs lost to the Boston Bruins in seven games.

== Standings ==
=== Divisional standings ===
Atlantic Division
Pos	Team	GP	W	L	OTL	RW	GF	GA	GD	Pts
1	y – Florida Panthers	82	52	24	6	42	268	200	+68	110
2	x – Boston Bruins	82	47	20	15	36	267	224	+43	109
3	x – Toronto Maple Leafs	82	46	26	10	33	303	263	+40	102
4	x – Tampa Bay Lightning	82	45	29	8	37	291	268	+23	98
5	Detroit Red Wings	82	41	32	9	27	278	274	+4	91
6	Buffalo Sabres	82	39	37	6	33	246	244	+2	84
7	Ottawa Senators	82	37	41	4	25	255	281	−26	78
8	Montreal Canadiens	82	30	36	16	20	236	289	−53	76

Source: National Hockey League
Rules for classification: 1) Fewer number of games played (GP, only during regular season); 2) Greater number of regulation wins (RW); 3) Greater number of wins in regulation and overtime, excluding shootout wins (ROW); 4) Greater number of total wins, including shootouts (W); 5) Greater number of points earned in head-to-head play; if teams played an uneven number of head-to-head games, the result of the first game on the home ice of the team with the extra home game is discarded; 6) Greater goal differential (GD); 7) Greater number of goals scored (GF)
x – Clinched playoff spot; y – Clinched division

=== Conference standings ===
Eastern Conference Wild Card
Pos	Div	Team	GP	W	L	OTL	RW	GF	GA	GD	Pts
1	AT	x – Tampa Bay Lightning	82	45	29	8	37	291	268	+23	98
2	ME	x – Washington Capitals	82	40	31	11	32	220	257	−37	91
3	AT	Detroit Red Wings	82	41	32	9	27	278	274	+4	91
4	ME	Pittsburgh Penguins	82	38	32	12	32	255	251	+4	88
5	ME	Philadelphia Flyers	82	38	33	11	30	235	261	−26	87
6	AT	Buffalo Sabres	82	39	37	6	33	246	244	+2	84
7	ME	New Jersey Devils	82	38	39	5	33	264	283	−19	81
8	AT	Ottawa Senators	82	37	41	4	25	255	281	−26	78
9	AT	Montreal Canadiens	82	30	36	16	20	236	289	−53	76
10	ME	Columbus Blue Jackets	82	27	43	12	21	237	300	−63	66

Source: National Hockey League
Rules for classification: 1) Fewer number of games played (GP, only during regular season); 2) Greater number of regulation wins (RW); 3) Greater number of wins in regulation and overtime, excluding shootout wins (ROW); 4) Greater number of total wins, including shootouts (W); 5) Greater number of points earned in head-to-head play; if teams played an uneven number of head-to-head games, the result of the first game on the home ice of the team with the extra home game is discarded; 6) Greater goal differential (GD); 7) Greater number of goals scored (GF)
x – Clinched playoff spot

== Schedule and results ==
=== Preseason ===
2023 preseason game log: 4–2–2 (Home: 2–0–2; Road: 2–2–0)
#	Date	Visitor	Score	Home	OT	Decision	Location	Attendance	Record	Recap
1	September 24	Toronto	2–3	Ottawa		Petruzzelli (0–1–0)	Canadian Tire Centre	15,013	0–1–0
2	September 25	Ottawa	4–3	Toronto	OT	Jones (0–0–1)	Scotiabank Arena	14,296	0–1–1
3	September 27	Buffalo	2–5	Toronto		Jones (1–0–1)	Joe Thornton Community Centre	3,000	1–1–1
4	September 29	Toronto	2–1	Montreal		Samsonov (1–0–0)	Bell Centre	20,571	2–1–1
5	September 30	Toronto	3–1	Montreal		Jones (2–0–1)	Bell Centre	20,729	3–1–1
6	October 2	Montreal	5–4	Toronto	OT	Samsonov (1–0–1)	Scotiabank Arena	18,631	3–1–2
7	October 5	Detroit	3–4	Toronto	OT	Samsonov (2–0–1)	Scotiabank Arena	18,011	4–1–2
8	October 7	Toronto	3–4	Detroit		Woll (0–1–0)	Little Caesars Arena	18,595	4–2–2

=== Regular season ===
2023–24 Game Log: 46–26–10, 102 points (home: 22–15–4; road: 24–11–6)

October: 5–3–1, 11 points (Home: 2–2–0; Road: 3–1–1)
#	Date	Visitor	Score	Home	OT	Decision	Attendance	Record	Pts	Recap
1	October 11	Montreal	5–6	Toronto	SO	Samsonov (1–0–0)	18,948	1–0–0	2
2	October 14	Minnesota	4–7	Toronto		Samsonov (2–0–0)	18,903	2–0–0	4
3	October 16	Chicago	4–1	Toronto		Woll (0–1–0)	19,101	2–1–0	4
4	October 19	Toronto	1–3	Florida		Samsonov (2–1–0)	19,288	2–2–0	4
5	October 21	Toronto	4–3	Tampa Bay	OT	Woll (1–1–0)	19,092	3–2–0	6
6	October 24	Toronto	4–1	Washington		Woll (2–1–0)	16,641	4–2–0	8
7	October 26	Toronto	4–1	Dallas		Woll (3–1–0)	18,532	5–2–0	10
8	October 28	Toronto	2–3	Nashville	OT	Samsonov (2–1–1)	17,537	5–2–1	11
9	October 31	Los Angeles	4–1	Toronto		Woll (3–2–0)	18,531	5–3–1	11

November: 7–3–2, 16 points (Home: 5–2–0; Road: 2–1–2)
#	Date	Visitor	Score	Home	OT	Decision	Attendance	Record	Pts	Recap
10	November 2	Toronto	2–3	Boston	SO	Samsonov (2–1–2)	17,850	5–3–2	12
11	November 4	Buffalo	6–4	Toronto		Woll (3–3–0)	18,902	5–4–2	12
12	November 6	Tampa Bay	5–6	Toronto	OT	Woll (4–3–0)	18,445	6–4–2	14
13	November 8	Ottawa	6–3	Toronto		Woll (4–4–0)	18,372	6–5–2	14
14	November 10	Calgary	4–5	Toronto	SO	Woll (5–4–0)	18,939	7–5–2	16
15	November 11	Vancouver	2–5	Toronto		Samsonov (3–1–2)	19,107	8–5–2	18
16	November 17^{[a]}	Toronto	3–2	Detroit		Samsonov (4–1–2)	13,510	9–5–2	20
17	November 19^{[a]}	Toronto	4–3	Minnesota	OT	Woll (6–4–0)	13,356	10–5–2	22
18	November 24	Toronto	3–4	Chicago	OT	Samsonov (4–1–3)	20,238	10–5–3	23
19	November 25	Toronto	2–3	Pittsburgh		Woll (6–5–0)	18,229	10–6–3	23
20	November 28	Florida	1–2	Toronto	SO	Woll (7–5–0)	18,508	11–6–3	25
21	November 30	Seattle	3–4	Toronto	SO	Woll (8–5–0)	18,366	12–6–3	27

December: 5–4–4, 14 points (Home: 2–3–2; Road: 3–1–2)
#	Date	Visitor	Score	Home	OT	Decision	Attendance	Record	Pts	Recap
22	December 2	Boston	4–3	Toronto	OT	Woll (8–5–1)	18,959	12–6–4	28
23	December 7	Toronto	4–3	Ottawa		Jones (1–0–0)	19,309	13–6–4	30
24	December 9	Nashville	0–4	Toronto		Samsonov (5–1–3)	18,611	14–6–4	32
25	December 11	Toronto	3–4	NY Islanders	OT	Samsonov (5–1–4)	17,255	14–6–5	33
26	December 12	Toronto	7–3	NY Rangers		Jones (2–0–0)	18,006	15–6–5	35
27	December 14	Columbus	6–5	Toronto	OT	Samsonov (5–1–5)	18,338	15–6–6	36
28	December 16	Pittsburgh	0–7	Toronto		Jones (3–0–0)	18,921	16–6–6	38
29	December 19	NY Rangers	5–2	Toronto		Jones (3–1–0)	19,264	16–7–6	38
30	December 21	Toronto	3–9	Buffalo		Samsonov (5–2–5)	19,070	16–8–6	38
31	December 23	Toronto	4–1	Columbus		Jones (4–1–0)	17,806	17–8–6	40
32	December 27	Ottawa	4–2	Toronto		Jones (4–2–0)	19,261	17–9–6	40
33	December 29	Toronto	5–6	Columbus	OT	Samsonov (5–2–6)	18,516	17–9–7	41
34	December 30	Carolina	3–2	Toronto		Jones (4–3–0)	18,974	17–10–7	41

January: 8–4–1, 17 points (Home: 2–2–0; Road: 6–2–1)
#	Date	Visitor	Score	Home	OT	Decision	Attendance	Record	Pts	Recap
35	January 2	Toronto	3–0	Los Angeles		Jones (5–3–0)	18,145	18–10–7	43
36	January 3	Toronto	2–1	Anaheim	OT	Jones (6–3–0)	16,135	19–10–7	45
37	January 6	Toronto	4–1	San Jose		Jones (7–3–0)	17,435	20–10–7	47
38	January 9	San Jose	1–7	Toronto		Jones (8–3–0)	18,364	21–10–7	49
39	January 11	Toronto	3–4	NY Islanders	OT	Jones (8–3–1)	17,255	21–10–8	50
40	January 13	Colorado	5–3	Toronto		Jones (8–4–1)	19,298	21–11–8	50
41	January 14	Detroit	4–2	Toronto		Samsonov (5–3–6)	18,772	21–12–8	50
42	January 16	Toronto	2–4	Edmonton		Jones (8–5–1)	18,347	21–13–8	50
43	January 18	Toronto	4–3	Calgary		Jones (9–5–1)	18,714	22–13–8	52
44	January 20	Toronto	4–6	Vancouver		Jones (9–6–1)	18,865	22–14–8	52
45	January 21	Toronto	3–1	Seattle		Samsonov (6–3–6)	17,151	23–14–8	54
46	January 24	Winnipeg	0–1	Toronto	OT	Samsonov (7–3–6)	18,972	24–14–8	56
47	January 27	Toronto	4–2	Winnipeg		Samsonov (8–3–6)	15,225	25–14–8	58

February: 9–3–0, 18 points (Home: 5–2–0; Road: 4–1–0)
#	Date	Visitor	Score	Home	OT	Decision	Attendance	Record	Pts	Recap
48	February 5	NY Islanders	3–2	Toronto		Samsonov (8–4–6)	18,365	25–15–8	58
49	February 7	Dallas	4–5	Toronto		Samsonov (9–4–6)	18,517	26–15–8	60
50	February 10	Toronto	3–5	Ottawa		Jones (9–7–1)	19,679	26–16–8	60
51	February 13	St. Louis	1–4	Toronto		Samsonov (10–4–6)	18,307	27–16–8	62
52	February 15	Philadelphia	3–4	Toronto	OT	Samsonov (11–4–6)	18,646	28–16–8	64
53	February 17	Anaheim	2–9	Toronto		Jones (10–7–1)	19,247	29–16–8	66
54	February 19	Toronto	4–2	St. Louis		Samsonov (12–4–6)	18,096	30–16–8	68
55	February 21	Toronto	6–3	Arizona		Samsonov (13–4–6)	4,600	31–16–8	70
56	February 22	Toronto	7–3	Vegas		Jones (11–7–1)	18,188	32–16–8	72
57	February 24	Toronto	4–3	Colorado		Samsonov (14–4–6)	18,135	33–16–8	74
58	February 27	Vegas	6–2	Toronto		Samsonov (14–5–6)	18,907	33–17–8	74
59	February 29	Arizona	2–4	Toronto		Woll (9–5–1)	18,662	34–17–8	76

March: 8–5–1, 17 points (Home: 4–2–1; Road: 4–3–0)
#	Date	Visitor	Score	Home	OT	Decision	Attendance	Record	Pts	Recap
60	March 2	NY Rangers	3–4	Toronto	SO	Samsonov (15–5–6)	19,312	35–17–8	78
61	March 4	Boston	4–1	Toronto		Woll (9–6–1)	18,911	35–18–8	78
62	March 6	Buffalo	1–2	Toronto	OT	Samsonov (16–5–6)	18,624	36–18–8	80
63	March 7	Toronto	1–4	Boston		Woll (9–7–1)	17,850	36–19–8	80
64	March 9	Toronto	3–2	Montreal		Samsonov (17–5–6)	21,105	37–19–8	82
65	March 14	Toronto	6–2	Philadelphia		Samsonov (18–5–6)	19,158	38–19–8	84
66	March 16	Carolina	5–4	Toronto	SO	Samsonov (18–5–7)	19,103	38–19–9	85
67	March 19	Toronto	3–4	Philadelphia		Samsonov (18–6–7)	18,623	38–20–9	85
68	March 20	Toronto	7–3	Washington		Woll (10–7–1)	17,727	39–20–9	87
69	March 23	Edmonton	3–6	Toronto		Samsonov (19–6–7)	19,342	40–20–9	89
70	March 24	Toronto	1–2	Carolina		Woll (10–8–1)	18,723	40–21–9	89
71	March 26	New Jersey	6–3	Toronto		Woll (10–9–1)	18,360	40–22–9	89
72	March 28	Washington	1–5	Toronto		Woll (11–9–1)	18,577	41–22–9	91
73	March 30	Toronto	3–0	Buffalo		Samsonov (20–6–7)	19,070	42–22–9	93

April: 4–4–1, 9 points (Home: 2–2–1; Road: 2–2–0)
#	Date	Visitor	Score	Home	OT	Decision	Attendance	Record	Pts	Recap
74	April 1	Florida	4–6	Toronto		Samsonov (21–6–7)	18,776	43–22–9	95
75	April 3	Tampa Bay	4–1	Toronto		Woll (11–10–1)	18,648	43–23–9	95
76	April 6	Toronto	4–2	Montreal		Samsonov (22–6–7)	21,105	44–23–9	97
77	April 8	Pittsburgh	2–3	Toronto	OT	Samsonov (23–6–7)	18,441	45–23–9	99
78	April 9	Toronto	5–2	New Jersey		Woll (12–10–1)	16,018	46–23–9	101
79	April 11	New Jersey	6–5	Toronto		Samsonov (23–7–7)	18,618	46–24–9	101
80	April 13	Detroit	5–4	Toronto	OT	Samsonov (23–7–8)	19,123	46–24–10	102
81	April 16	Toronto	2–5	Florida		Woll (12–11–1)	18,317	46–25–10	102
82	April 17	Toronto	4–6	Tampa Bay		Jones (11–8–1)	19,092	46–26–10	102

Legend: Win (2 points) Loss (0 points) Overtime/shootout loss (1 point)
Notes:
^{a} Game was played at Avicii Arena in Stockholm, Sweden.

=== Playoffs ===
2024 Stanley Cup Playoffs

Eastern Conference first round vs (A2) Boston Bruins: Boston won 4–3
#	Date	Visitor	Score	Home	OT	Decision	Attendance	Series	Recap
1	April 20	Toronto	1–5	Boston		Samsonov (0–1)	17,850	0–1
2	April 22	Toronto	3–2	Boston		Samsonov (1–1)	17,850	1–1
3	April 24	Boston	4–2	Toronto		Samsonov (1–2)	19,423	1–2
4	April 27	Boston	3–1	Toronto		Samsonov (1–3)	19,256	1–3
5	April 30	Toronto	2–1	Boston	OT	Woll (1–0)	17,850	2–3
6	May 2	Boston	1–2	Toronto		Woll (2–0)	19,471	3–3
7	May 4	Toronto	1–2	Boston	OT	Samsonov (1–4)	17,850	3–4

Legend: Win Loss

== Player statistics ==
=== Skaters ===
Regular season
Player	GP	G	A	Pts	+/−	PIM
Auston Matthews	81	69	38	107	+31	20
William Nylander	82	40	58	98	+1	24
Mitch Marner	69	26	59	85	+21	18
John Tavares	80	29	36	65	+2	30
Morgan Rielly	72	7	51	58	+7	27
Max Domi	80	9	38	47	+10	118
Tyler Bertuzzi	80	21	22	43	+2	53
Matthew Knies	80	15	20	35	+9	45
Jake McCabe	73	8	20	28	+20	56
Nicholas Robertson	56	14	13	27	+4	4
T. J. Brodie	78	1	25	26	+17	40
Bobby McMann	56	15	9	24	+13	52
Timothy Liljegren	55	3	20	23	+3	16
Calle Jarnkrok	52	10	11	21	+16	18
David Kampf	78	8	11	19	−4	18
Pontus Holmberg	54	7	10	17	+11	18
Noah Gregor	63	6	6	12	−7	17
Conor Timmins	25	1	9	10	+9	18
Mark Giordano	46	3	6	9	+10	49
Ryan Reaves	49	4	2	6	−13	49
Simon Benoit	64	1	4	5	+7	56
Connor Dewar	17	1	4	5	−2	8
John Klingberg	14	0	5	5	−7	8
Ilya Lyubushkin	19	0	4	4	+2	6
William Lagesson ^{(X)}	30	0	4	4	+5	19
Maxime Lajoie ^{(M)}	7	0	1	1	+1	0
Marshall Rifai ^{(M)}	2	0	0	0	+1	0
Fraser Minten ^{(J)}	4	0	0	0	0	2
Alex Steeves ^{(M)}	1	0	0	0	−1	0
Joel Edmundson	9	0	0	0	+3	4

Playoffs
Player	GP	G	A	Pts	+/−	PIM
Auston Matthews	5	1	3	4	+2	2
Max Domi	7	1	3	4	+1	6
Tyler Bertuzzi	7	1	3	4	+2	6
William Nylander	4	3	0	3	+2	4
Matthew Knies	7	2	1	3	−1	2
Mitch Marner	7	1	2	3	+1	2
Ilya Lyubushkin	7	0	3	3	+4	2
Morgan Rielly	7	0	3	3	+2	0
John Tavares	7	1	1	2	0	2
David Kampf	7	1	0	1	−2	0
Jake McCabe	7	1	0	1	0	4
Connor Dewar	6	0	1	1	−1	0
Timothy Liljegren	6	0	1	1	−1	2
Joel Edmundson	7	0	1	1	−1	6
Ryan Reaves	5	0	1	1	−1	2
Nicholas Robertson	6	0	0	0	−2	0
Simon Benoit	7	0	0	0	−3	4
Pontus Holmberg	7	0	0	0	−3	2
Noah Gregor	2	0	0	0	−1	0
Calle Jarnkrok	7	0	0	0	−2	0
T. J. Brodie	1	0	0	0	−2	0

=== Goaltenders ===
Regular season
Player	GP	GS	TOI	W	L	OT	GA	GAA	SA	SV%	SO	G	A	PIM
Ilya Samsonov	40	40	2,300:58	23	7	8	120	3.13	1,087	.890	3	0	1	0
Joseph Woll	25	23	1,471:39	12	11	1	72	2.84	772	.907	0	0	0	0
Martin Jones	22	19	1,169:40	11	8	1	56	2.87	574	.902	2	0	0	0

Playoffs
Player	GP	GS	TOI	W	L	GA	GAA	SA	SV%	SO	G	A	PIM
Joseph Woll	3	2	139:49	2	0	2	0.86	56	.964	0	0	0	2
Ilya Samsonov	5	5	279:07	1	4	14	3.01	135	.896	0	0	0	0

^{(M)} Player was playing for the minor league affiliate Toronto Marlies of the AHL at the end of the regular season
^{(J)} Player assigned to junior club during the regular season
^{(X)} Player was no longer with the Maple Leafs organization by the end of the regular season
Player was on injured reserve list at season's end
Bold/italics denotes franchise record.

== Transactions ==
The Maple Leafs have been involved in the following transactions during the 2023–24 season.

=== Key ===
† Contract is entry-level.
‡ Contract initially takes effect in the 2024–25 season.

=== Trades ===
Date	Details		Ref
October 8, 2023	To Vancouver Canucks Sam Lafferty	To Toronto Maple Leafs 5th-round pick in 2024	
February 29, 2024	To Anaheim Ducks TOR 3rd-round pick in 2025	To Toronto Maple Leafs Ilya Lyubushkin^{1} Rights to Kirill Slepets	
February 29, 2024	To Carolina Hurricanes TOR 6th-round pick in 2024	To Toronto Maple Leafs Ilya Lyubushkin^{1} Rights to Kirill Slepets	
March 7, 2024	To Carolina Hurricanes 6th-round pick in 2026	To Toronto Maple Leafs Cade Webber	
March 7, 2024	To Washington Capitals NYI 3rd-round pick in 2024; CHI 5th-round pick in 2025	To Toronto Maple Leafs Joel Edmundson^{2}	
March 8, 2024	To Minnesota Wild Dmitry Ovchinnikov; 4th-round pick in 2026	To Toronto Maple Leafs Connor Dewar	

==== Notes ====
1. Anaheim retains 50% and Carolina retains 25% of Lyubushkin's remaining contract.
2. Washington retains 50% of Edmundson's remaining contract.

=== Players acquired ===
Date	Player	Former team	Term	Via	Ref
July 1, 2023	John Klingberg	Minnesota Wild	1-year	Free agency	
July 1, 2023	William Lagesson	Carolina Hurricanes	1-year	Free agency	
July 1, 2023	Maxime Lajoie	Carolina Hurricanes	1-year	Free agency	
July 1, 2023	Ryan Reaves	Minnesota Wild	3-year	Free agency	
July 1, 2023	Marshall Rifai	Toronto Marlies (AHL)	2-year	Free agency	
July 2, 2023	Tyler Bertuzzi	Boston Bruins	1-year	Free agency	
July 2, 2023	Max Domi	Dallas Stars	1-year	Free agency	
July 3, 2023	Dylan Gambrell	Ottawa Senators	1-year	Free agency	
August 9, 2023	Martin Jones	Seattle Kraken	1-year	Free agency	
August 28, 2023	Simon Benoit	Anaheim Ducks	1-year	Free agency	
October 10, 2023	Noah Gregor	San Jose Sharks	1-year	Free agency	
April 14, 2024	Nicolas Mattinen	Straubing Tigers	1-year ‡	Free agency	

=== Players lost ===
Date	Player	New team	Term	Via	Ref
July 1, 2023	Noel Acciari	Pittsburgh Penguins	3-year	Free agency	
July 1, 2023	Michael Bunting	Carolina Hurricanes	3-year	Free agency	
July 1, 2023	Erik Gustafsson	New York Rangers	1-year	Free agency	
July 1, 2023	Justin Holl	Detroit Red Wings	3-year	Free agency	
July 1, 2023	Erik Kallgren	New Jersey Devils	1-year	Free agency	
July 1, 2023	Alexander Kerfoot	Arizona Coyotes	2-year	Free agency	
July 1, 2023	Ryan O'Reilly	Nashville Predators	4-year	Free agency	
July 1, 2023	Luke Schenn	Nashville Predators	3-year	Free agency	
July 2, 2023	Mac Hollowell	New York Rangers	1-year	Free agency	
July 2, 2023	Radim Zohorna	Pittsburgh Penguins	1-year	Free agency	
July 4, 2023	Semyon Der-Arguchintsev	Traktor Chelyabinsk (KHL)	2-year	Free agency	
July 5, 2023	Victor Mete	Philadelphia Flyers	1-year	Free agency	
July 14, 2023	Filip Kral	Lahti Pelicans (Liiga)	1-year	Free agency	
October 8, 2023	Zach Aston-Reese	Detroit Red Wings	1-year	Free agency	
March 8, 2024	William Lagesson	Anaheim Ducks		Waivers	

=== Signings ===
Date	Player	Term	Ref
June 28, 2023	Pontus Holmberg	1-year	
June 28, 2023	David Kampf	4-year	
July 1, 2023	Artur Akhtyamov	3-year†	
July 23, 2023	Ilya Samsonov	1-year	
July 31, 2023	Nick Abruzzese	2-year	
August 11, 2023	Easton Cowan	3-year†	
August 23, 2023	Auston Matthews	4-year‡	
December 22, 2023	Noah Chadwick	3-year†	
January 7, 2024	William Nylander	8-year‡	

== Draft picks ==
Below are the Toronto Maple Leafs' selections at the 2023 NHL entry draft, which was held on June 28 to 29, 2023, at Bridgestone Arena in Nashville.

Round	#	Player	Pos.	Nationality	Team (League)
1	28	Easton Cowan	RW	Canada	London Knights (OHL)
5	153	Hudson Malinoski	C	Canada	Brooks Bandits (AJHL)
6	185	Noah Chadwick	D	Canada	Lethbridge Hurricanes (WHL)
