= 2023–24 Montreal Canadiens season =

Season of play of professional ice hockey team

2023–24 Montreal Canadiens
- Division: 8th Atlantic
- Conference: 15th Eastern
- 2023–24 record: 30–36–16
- Home record: 16–20–5
- Road record: 14–16–11
- Goals for: 236
- Goals against: 289

Team information
- General manager: Kent Hughes
- Coach: Martin St. Louis; Trevor Letowski (interim, Mar. 16 – Mar. 25)
- Captain: Nick Suzuki
- Alternate captains: Brendan Gallagher; Mike Matheson
- Arena: Bell Centre
- Average attendance: 21,099
- Minor league affiliates: Laval Rocket (AHL); Trois-Rivières Lions (ECHL)

Team leaders
- Goals: Nick Suzuki (33)
- Assists: Mike Matheson (51)
- Points: Nick Suzuki (77)
- Penalty minutes: Arber Xhekaj (81)
- Plus/minus: Johnathan Kovacevic (+11)
- Wins: Sam Montembeault (16)
- Goals against average: Cayden Primeau (2.99)

The 2023–24 Montreal Canadiens season was the 115th for the club that was established on December 4, 1909, and their 107th season as a franchise in the National Hockey League (NHL).

On April 4, 2024, the Canadiens were eliminated from playoff contention for a third consecutive year marking the first such drought for the franchise since 1999–2001 and only the third span collectively in the team's history following a 7–4 loss to the Tampa Bay Lightning. Similarly, the Canadiens would finish last in their division for the third consecutive season, a first occurrence in team history.

== Standings ==
=== Divisional standings ===
Atlantic Division
Pos	Team	GP	W	L	OTL	RW	GF	GA	GD	Pts
1	y – Florida Panthers	82	52	24	6	42	268	200	+68	110
2	x – Boston Bruins	82	47	20	15	36	267	224	+43	109
3	x – Toronto Maple Leafs	82	46	26	10	33	303	263	+40	102
4	x – Tampa Bay Lightning	82	45	29	8	37	291	268	+23	98
5	Detroit Red Wings	82	41	32	9	27	278	274	+4	91
6	Buffalo Sabres	82	39	37	6	33	246	244	+2	84
7	Ottawa Senators	82	37	41	4	25	255	281	−26	78
8	Montreal Canadiens	82	30	36	16	20	236	289	−53	76

Source: National Hockey League
Rules for classification: 1) Fewer number of games played (GP, only during regular season); 2) Greater number of regulation wins (RW); 3) Greater number of wins in regulation and overtime, excluding shootout wins (ROW); 4) Greater number of total wins, including shootouts (W); 5) Greater number of points earned in head-to-head play; if teams played an uneven number of head-to-head games, the result of the first game on the home ice of the team with the extra home game is discarded; 6) Greater goal differential (GD); 7) Greater number of goals scored (GF)
x – Clinched playoff spot; y – Clinched division

=== Conference standings ===
Eastern Conference Wild Card
Pos	Div	Team	GP	W	L	OTL	RW	GF	GA	GD	Pts
1	AT	x – Tampa Bay Lightning	82	45	29	8	37	291	268	+23	98
2	ME	x – Washington Capitals	82	40	31	11	32	220	257	−37	91
3	AT	Detroit Red Wings	82	41	32	9	27	278	274	+4	91
4	ME	Pittsburgh Penguins	82	38	32	12	32	255	251	+4	88
5	ME	Philadelphia Flyers	82	38	33	11	30	235	261	−26	87
6	AT	Buffalo Sabres	82	39	37	6	33	246	244	+2	84
7	ME	New Jersey Devils	82	38	39	5	33	264	283	−19	81
8	AT	Ottawa Senators	82	37	41	4	25	255	281	−26	78
9	AT	Montreal Canadiens	82	30	36	16	20	236	289	−53	76
10	ME	Columbus Blue Jackets	82	27	43	12	21	237	300	−63	66

Source: National Hockey League
Rules for classification: 1) Fewer number of games played (GP, only during regular season); 2) Greater number of regulation wins (RW); 3) Greater number of wins in regulation and overtime, excluding shootout wins (ROW); 4) Greater number of total wins, including shootouts (W); 5) Greater number of points earned in head-to-head play; if teams played an uneven number of head-to-head games, the result of the first game on the home ice of the team with the extra home game is discarded; 6) Greater goal differential (GD); 7) Greater number of goals scored (GF)
x – Clinched playoff spot

== Schedule and results ==
=== Preseason ===
2023 preseason game log: 3–3–0 (home: 1–3–0; road: 2–0–0)
#	Date	Visitor	Score	Home	OT	Decision	Attendance	Record	Recap
1	September 25	New Jersey	4–2	Montreal		Dobes	20,129	0–1–0
2	September 27	Ottawa	3–4	Montreal		Primeau	20,225	1–1–0
3	September 29	Toronto	2–1	Montreal		Primeau	20,571	1–2–0
4	September 30	Toronto	3–1	Montreal		Montembeault	20,729	1–3–0
5	October 2	Montreal	5–4	Toronto	OT	Allen	18,631	2–3–0
6	October 7	Montreal	6–4	Ottawa		Montembeault	17,601	3–3–0

=== Regular season ===
The regular season schedule was released on June 27, 2023.

2023–24 game log

October: 5–2–2 (home: 4–2–0; road: 1–0–2)
#	Date	Visitor	Score	Home	OT	Decision	Attendance	Record	Pts	Recap
1	October 11	Montreal	5–6	Toronto	SO	Allen	18,948	0–0–1	1
2	October 14	Chicago	2–3	Montreal		Montembeault	21,105	1–0–1	3
3	October 17	Minnesota	5–2	Montreal		Montembeault	21,105	1–1–1	3
4	October 21	Washington	2–3	Montreal	OT	Allen	21,105	2–1–1	5
5	October 23	Montreal	3–1	Buffalo		Allen	13,507	3–1–1	7
6	October 24	New Jersey	5–2	Montreal		Primeau	21,105	3–2–1	7
7	October 26	Columbus	3–4	Montreal	OT	Montembeault	21,105	4–2–1	9
8	October 28	Winnipeg	3–4	Montreal	SO	Allen	21,105	5–2–1	11
9	October 30	Montreal	2–3	Vegas	SO	Montembeault	17,791	5–2–2	12

November: 5–9–0 (home: 1–5–0; road: 4–4–0)
#	Date	Visitor	Score	Home	OT	Decision	Attendance	Record	Pts	Recap
10	November 2	Montreal	2–3	Arizona		Allen	4,600	5–3–2	12
11	November 4	Montreal	3–6	St. Louis		Montembeault	18,096	5–4–2	12
12	November 7	Tampa Bay	5–3	Montreal		Allen	21,105	5–5–2	12
13	November 9	Montreal	3–2	Detroit	OT	Primeau	18,504	6–5–2	14
14	November 11	Boston	2–3	Montreal	OT	Montembeault	21,105	7–5–2	16
15	November 12	Vancouver	5–2	Montreal		Allen	21,105	7–6–2	16
16	November 14	Calgary	2–1	Montreal		Montembeault	21,105	7–7–2	16
17	November 16	Vegas	6–5	Montreal		Primeau	21,105	7–8–2	16
18	November 18	Montreal	2–5	Boston		Allen	17,850	7–9–2	16
19	November 22	Montreal	4–3	Anaheim		Montembeault	15,168	8–9–2	18
20	November 24	Montreal	3–2	San Jose	SO	Primeau	16,897	9–9–2	20
21	November 25	Montreal	0–4	Los Angeles		Allen	18,145	9–10–2	20
22	November 29	Montreal	4–2	Columbus		Montembeault	14,316	10–10–2	22
23	November 30	Florida	5–1	Montreal		Primeau	21,105	10–11–2	22

December: 5–5–3 (home: 2–2–2; road: 3–3–1)
#	Date	Visitor	Score	Home	OT	Decision	Attendance	Record	Pts	Recap
24	December 2	Detroit	5–4	Montreal	OT	Allen	21,105	10–11–3	23
25	December 4	Seattle	2–4	Montreal		Montembeault	20,915	11–11–3	25
26	December 7	Los Angeles	4–0	Montreal		Montembeault	21,105	11–12–3	25
27	December 9	Montreal	3–2	Buffalo	SO	Primeau	17,123	12–12–3	27
28	December 10	Nashville	2–1	Montreal		Allen	20,864	12–13–3	27
29	December 13	Pittsburgh	4–3	Montreal	SO	Montembeault	21,105	12–13–4	28
30	December 16	NY Islanders	3–5	Montreal		Montembeault	21,105	13–13–4	30
31	December 18	Montreal	3–2	Winnipeg	OT	Allen	13,363	14–13–4	32
32	December 21	Montreal	3–4	Minnesota	OT	Montembeault	18,387	14–13–5	33
33	December 22	Montreal	5–2	Chicago		Primeau	20,340	15–13–5	35
34	December 28	Montreal	3–5	Carolina		Primeau	18,969	15–14–5	35
35	December 30	Montreal	1–4	Florida		Allen	19,663	15–15–5	35
36	December 31	Montreal	3–4	Tampa Bay		Montembeault	19,092	15–16–5	35

January: 5–5–3 (home: 3–3–1; road: 2–2–2)
#	Date	Visitor	Score	Home	OT	Decision	Attendance	Record	Pts	Recap
37	January 2	Montreal	4–3	Dallas		Montembeault	18,532	16–16–5	37
38	January 4	Buffalo	6–1	Montreal		Allen	21,105	16–17–5	37
39	January 6	NY Rangers	3–4	Montreal	SO	Montembeault	21,105	17–17–5	39
40	January 10	Montreal	2–3	Philadelphia	SO	Primeau	18,238	17–17–6	40
41	January 11	San Jose	3–2	Montreal		Montembeault	21,105	17–18–6	40
42	January 13	Edmonton	2–1	Montreal	OT	Montembeault	21,105	17–18–7	41
43	January 15	Colorado	3–4	Montreal		Allen	21,105	18–18–7	43
44	January 17	Montreal	3–2	New Jersey		Montembeault	16,022	19–18–7	45
45	January 18	Montreal	2–6	Ottawa		Primeau	19,286	19–19–7	45
46	January 20	Montreal	4–9	Boston		Montembeault	17,850	19–20–7	45
47	January 23	Ottawa	4–1	Montreal		Allen	21,105	19–21–7	45
48	January 25	NY Islanders	3–4	Montreal		Montembeault	21,105	20–21–7	47
49	January 27	Montreal	2–3	Pittsburgh	OT	Allen	18,377	20–21–8	48

February: 3–7–1 (home: 2–4–0; road: 1–3–1)
#	Date	Visitor	Score	Home	OT	Decision	Attendance	Record	Pts	Recap
50	February 6	Montreal	5–2	Washington		Montembeault	16,959	21–21–8	50
51	February 10	Dallas	3–2	Montreal		Montembeault	21,105	21–22–8	50
52	February 11	St. Louis	7–2	Montreal		Allen	21,105	21–23–8	50
53	February 13	Anaheim	0–5	Montreal		Primeau	21,105	22–23–8	52
54	February 15	Montreal	4–7	NY Rangers		Montembeault	18,006	22–24–8	52
55	February 17	Washington	4–3	Montreal		Allen	21,105	22–25–8	52
56	February 21	Buffalo	3–2	Montreal		Montembeault	21,105	22–26–8	52
57	February 22	Montreal	1–4	Pittsburgh		Primeau	17,160	22–27–8	52
58	February 24	Montreal	3–4	New Jersey		Allen	16,514	22–28–8	52
59	February 27	Arizona	2–4	Montreal		Montembeault	21,105	23–28–8	54
60	February 29	Montreal	3–4	Florida	SO	Montembeault	18,918	23–28–9	55

March: 5–5–3 (home: 2–2–1; road: 3–3–2)
#	Date	Visitor	Score	Home	OT	Decision	Attendance	Record	Pts	Recap
61	March 2	Montreal	3–4	Tampa Bay	SO	Primeau	19,092	23–28–10	56
62	March 5	Montreal	4–3	Nashville	OT	Allen	17,159	24–28–10	58
63	March 7	Montreal	1–4	Carolina		Montembeault	18,859	24–29–10	58
64	March 9	Toronto	3–2	Montreal		Montembeault	21,105	24–30–10	58
65	March 12	Columbus	0–3	Montreal		Primeau	21,105	25–30–10	60
66	March 14	Boston	2–1	Montreal	OT	Montembeault	21,105	25–30–11	61
67	March 16	Montreal	2–5	Calgary		Primeau	19,183	25–31–11	61
68	March 19	Montreal	2–3	Edmonton	OT	Montembeault	18,347	25–31–12	62
69	March 21	Montreal	1–4	Vancouver		Montembeault	18,804	25–32–12	62
70	March 24	Montreal	5–1	Seattle		Primeau	17,151	26–32–12	64
71	March 26	Montreal	2–1	Colorado		Montembeault	18,119	27–32–12	66
72	March 28	Philadelphia	1–4	Montreal		Primeau	21,105	28–32–12	68
73	March 30	Carolina	3–0	Montreal		Montembeault	21,105	28–33–12	68

April: 2–3–4 (home: 2–2–1; road: 0–1–3)
#	Date	Visitor	Score	Home	OT	Decision	Attendance	Record	Pts	Recap
74	April 2	Florida	3–5	Montreal		Montembeault	21,105	29–33–12	70
75	April 4	Tampa Bay	7–4	Montreal		Primeau	21,105	29–34–12	70
76	April 6	Toronto	4–2	Montreal		Montembeault	21,105	29–35–12	70
77	April 7	Montreal	2–5	NY Rangers		Primeau	17,854	29–36–12	70
78	April 9	Philadelphia	3–9	Montreal		Montembeault	21,105	30–36–12	72
79	April 11	Montreal	2–3	NY Islanders	OT	Montembeault	17,255	30–36–13	73
80	April 13	Montreal	4–5	Ottawa	SO	Primeau	19,337	30–36–14	74
81	April 15	Montreal	4–5	Detroit	OT	Montembeault	19,515	30–36–15	75
82	April 16	Detroit	5–4	Montreal	SO	Primeau	21,105	30–36–16	76

Legend: Win (2 points) Loss (0 points) Overtime/shootout loss (1 point)

== Player statistics ==
Final stats

=== Skaters ===
Regular season
Player	GP	G	A	Pts	+/−	PIM
Nick Suzuki	82	33	44	77	−14	36
Cole Caufield	82	28	37	65	−4	16
Mike Matheson	82	11	51	62	−24	58
Juraj Slafkovsky	82	20	30	50	−19	55
Sean Monahan^{‡}	49	13	22	35	−10	10
Alex Newhook	55	15	19	34	−11	18
Brendan Gallagher	77	16	15	31	−24	74
Jake Evans	82	7	21	28	−1	24
Joel Armia	66	17	8	25	+4	34
David Savard	60	6	18	24	−1	24
Kaiden Guhle	70	6	16	22	−8	56
Josh Anderson	78	9	11	20	−18	74
Jordan Harris	56	3	11	14	−5	22
Justin Barron	48	7	6	13	−3	16
Johnathan Kovacevic	62	6	7	13	+11	42
Tanner Pearson	54	5	8	13	−12	21
Michael Pezzetta	61	3	9	12	+4	59
Arber Xhekaj	44	3	7	10	+6	81
Jayden Struble	56	3	7	10	−3	57
Rafael Harvey-Pinard	45	2	8	10	−2	6
Christian Dvorak	30	5	4	9	−5	4
Joshua Roy	23	4	5	9	−2	0
Jesse Ylonen	59	4	4	8	+2	12
Gustav Lindstrom^{‡}	14	3	1	4	0	6
Mitchell Stephens	23	2	1	3	+2	4
Kirby Dach	2	0	2	2	+2	0
Lane Hutson	2	0	2	2	–2	0
Brandon Gignac	7	1	0	1	−3	0
Logan Mailloux	1	0	1	1	+1	0
Lucas Condotta	3	0	0	0	+1	0
Emil Heineman	4	0	0	0	+2	0
Colin White^{†}	17	0	0	0	−3	2

=== Goaltenders ===
Regular season
Player	GP	GS	TOI	W	L	OT	GA	GAA	SA	SV%	SO	G	A	PIM
Sam Montembeault	41	40	2428:16	16	15	9	127	3.14	1307	.903	0	0	2	0
Cayden Primeau	23	21	1324:50	8	9	4	66	2.99	731	.910	2	0	2	2
Jake Allen^{‡}	21	21	1216:20	6	12	3	74	3.65	686	.892	0	0	1	2

^{†}Denotes player spent time with another team before joining the Canadiens. Stats reflect time with the Canadiens only.
^{‡}Denotes player was traded mid-season. Stats reflect time with the Canadiens only.
Bold/italics denotes franchise record.

== Suspensions/fines ==
Player	Explanation	Length	Salary	Date issued	Ref
Brendan Gallagher	Illegal check to the head of Islanders defenceman Adam Pelech	5 games	$169,270.85	January 26, 2024	
Kaiden Guhle	Slashing Flyers forward Travis Konecny	1 game	$4,496.53	March 29, 2024	

== Awards and honours ==
=== Awards ===
Regular season
Player	Award	Awarded	Ref
Nick Suzuki	NHL All-Star Game selection	January 4, 2024	
Nick Suzuki	NHL Third Star of the Week	February 12, 2024	

=== Milestones ===
Regular season
Player	Milestone	Reached	Ref
Nick Suzuki	300th career NHL game	October 30, 2023	
Jake Allen	400th career NHL game	November 2, 2023	
Brendan Gallagher	400th career NHL point	November 2, 2023	
Tanner Pearson	600th career NHL game	November 2, 2023	
Jake Evans	200th career NHL game	November 11, 2023	
Johnathan Kovacevic	100th career NHL game	November 22, 2023	
Sean Monahan	700th career NHL game	November 22, 2023	
Jayden Struble	1st career NHL game	November 22, 2023	
Cole Caufield	100th career NHL point	November 24, 2023	
Cayden Primeau	1st career NHL assist 1st career NHL point	November 24, 2023	
Jayden Struble	1st career NHL assist 1st career NHL point	November 24, 2023	
Brendan Gallagher	700th career NHL game	December 4, 2023	
Jayden Struble	1st career NHL goal	December 9, 2023	
Brendan Gallagher	200th career NHL assist	December 18, 2023	
Emil Heineman	1st career NHL game	December 21, 2023	
Sean Monahan	500th career NHL point	December 28, 2023	
Mike Matheson	500th career NHL game	December 30, 2023	
Mike Matheson	200th career NHL point	January 11, 2024	
Jordan Harris	100th career NHL game	January 13, 2024	
Joshua Roy	1st career NHL game	January 13, 2024	
Joshua Roy	1st career NHL goal 1st career NHL point	January 17, 2024	
Joshua Roy	1st career NHL assist	January 20, 2024	
Josh Anderson	500th career NHL game	January 23, 2024	
Brandon Gignac	1st career NHL goal 1st career NHL point	February 13, 2024	
Cayden Primeau	1st career NHL shutout	February 13, 2024	
Kaiden Guhle	100th career NHL game	February 29, 2024	
Jesse Ylonen	100th career NHL game	February 29, 2024	
Juraj Slafkovsky	100th career NHL game	March 2, 2024	
Nick Suzuki	100th career NHL goal	March 5, 2024	
Alex Newhook	200th career NHL game	March 19, 2024	
Joel Armia	500th career NHL game	April 7, 2024	
Cole Caufield	200th career NHL game	April 7, 2024	
Juraj Slafkovsky	1st career NHL hat-trick	April 9, 2024	
Lane Hutson	1st career NHL game 1st career NHL assist 1st career NHL point	April 15, 2024	
Logan Mailloux	1st career NHL game 1st career NHL assist 1st career NHL point	April 16, 2024	
Alex Newhook	100th career NHL point	April 16, 2024	

== Transactions ==
The Canadiens have been involved in the following transactions during the 2023–24 season.

=== Key ===
† Contract is entry-level.
‡ Contract initially takes effect in the 2024–25 season.

=== Trades ===
Date	Details		Ref
July 1, 2023	To Washington Capitals Joel Edmundson^{1}	To Montreal Canadiens MIN 3rd-round pick in 2024; 7th-round pick in 2024	
August 6, 2023	To Pittsburgh Penguins Mike Hoffman; Rem Pitlick	To Montreal Canadiens Jeff Petry; Casey DeSmith; Nathan Legare; 2nd-round pick in 2025	
August 15, 2023	To Detroit Red Wings Jeff Petry^{2}	To Montreal Canadiens Gustav Lindstrom; Conditional 4th-round pick in 2025^{3}	
September 13, 2023	To Ottawa Senators Future considerations	To Montreal Canadiens Jakov Novak	
September 19, 2023	To Vancouver Canucks Casey DeSmith	To Montreal Canadiens Tanner Pearson; 3rd-round pick in 2025	
January 11, 2024	To Buffalo Sabres Future considerations	To Montreal Canadiens Filip Cederqvist	
February 2, 2024	To Winnipeg Jets Sean Monahan	To Montreal Canadiens 1st-round pick in 2024; Conditional 3rd-round pick in 2027^{4}	
March 7, 2024	To Anaheim Ducks Jan Mysak	To Montreal Canadiens Jacob Perreault	
March 8, 2024	To New Jersey Devils Jake Allen^{5}	To Montreal Canadiens Conditional 3rd-round pick in 2025^{6}	
March 11, 2024	To New Jersey Devils Nathan Legare	To Montreal Canadiens Arnaud Durandeau	

==== Notes ====
1. The Canadiens will retain 50% of Edmundson's remaining salary until the end of the current season.
2. The Canadiens will retain 50% of Petry's yearly salary until the end of the 2024–25 season.
3. Montreal will receive the later of Detroit or Boston's fourth-round pick in 2025.
  Detroit previously acquired Boston's 2025 fourth-round pick as the result of a trade on March 2, 2023, that sent Tyler Bertuzzi to Boston in exchange for a conditional first-round pick in 2024 (top 10 protected) and this pick.
4. Montreal will receive the Jets' third-round pick in 2027 should Winnipeg win the Stanley Cup this season – was not converted following the Jets' First Round series loss to the Colorado Avalanche on April 30, 2024.
5. The Canadiens will retain 50% of Allen's yearly salary until the end of the 2024–25 season.
6. Montreal will receive the Devils' second-round pick in 2025 should Allen play in 40 or more games during the 2024–25 season and if Allen's club at that time (New Jersey or otherwise) qualifies for the 2025 Stanley Cup playoffs.

=== Players acquired ===
Date	Player	Former team (League)	Term	Via	Ref
July 1, 2023	Brady Keeper	Vancouver Canucks	1-year	Free agency	
July 1, 2023	Philippe Maillet	Metallurg Magnitogorsk (KHL)	1-year	Free agency	
July 2, 2023	Lias Andersson	Los Angeles Kings	1-year	Free agency	
February 4, 2024	Brandon Gignac	Laval Rocket (AHL)	2-year	Free agency	
February 22, 2024	Colin White	Pittsburgh Penguins		Waivers	
June 4, 2024	Connor Hughes	Lausanne HC (NL)	1-year^{‡}	Free agency	

=== Players lost ===
Date	Player	New team (League)	Term	Via	Ref
July 1, 2023	Alex Belzile	New York Rangers	2-year	Free agency	
July 1, 2023	Jonathan Drouin	Colorado Avalanche	1-year	Free agency	
July 1, 2023	Anthony Richard	Boston Bruins	1-year	Free agency	
July 1, 2023	Corey Schueneman	Colorado Avalanche	1-year	Free agency	
July 11, 2023	Denis Gurianov	Nashville Predators	1-year	Free agency	
July 14, 2023	Chris Tierney	New Jersey Devils	1-year	Free agency	
August 7, 2023	Joel Teasdale	Iowa Wild (AHL)	1-year	Free agency	
August 31, 2023	Madison Bowey	Dinamo Minsk (KHL)	1-year	Free agency	
September 20, 2023	Paul Byron			Retirement	
January 10, 2024	Gustav Lindstrom	Anaheim Ducks		Waivers	
January 29, 2024	Nicolas Beaudin			Mutual termination	
April 16, 2024	Chris Wideman			Retirement	
May 3, 2024	Filip Cederqvist	Frölunda HC (SHL)	3-year	Free agency	
June 19, 2024	Lias Andersson	EHC Biel-Bienne (NL)	2-year	Free agency	

=== Signings ===
Date	Player	Term	Ref
July 3, 2023	Rafael Harvey-Pinard	2-year	
July 5, 2023	David Reinbacher	3-year^{†}	
July 10, 2023	Mitchell Stephens	1-year	
July 11, 2023	Alex Newhook	4-year	
July 13, 2023	Nicolas Beaudin	1-year	
July 13, 2023	Lucas Condotta	2-year	
July 31, 2023	Jesse Ylonen	1-year	
December 1, 2023	Sam Montembeault	3-year^{‡}	
April 9, 2024	Florian Xhekaj	3-year^{†‡}	
April 12, 2024	Lane Hutson	3-year^{†}	
April 16, 2024	Luke Tuch	2-year^{†‡}	
May 3, 2024	Adam Engstrom	3-year^{†‡}	
May 31, 2024	Jared Davidson	2-year^{†‡}	
June 15, 2024	Oliver Kapanen	3-year^{†‡}	

== Draft picks ==
Below are the Montreal Canadiens' selections at the 2023 NHL entry draft, which was held on June 28–29, 2023, at Bridgestone Arena in Nashville, Tennessee.

Round	#	Player	Pos.	Nationality	Team (League)
1	5	David Reinbacher	D	Austria	EHC Kloten (NL)
3	69	Jacob Fowler	G	United States	Youngstown Phantoms (USHL)
4	101	Florian Xhekaj	LW	Canada	Hamilton Bulldogs (OHL)
4	110^{1}	Bogdan Konyushkov	D	Russia	Torpedo Nizhny Novgorod (KHL)
4	128^{2}	Quentin Miller	G	Canada	Quebec Remparts (QMJHL)
5	133	Sam Harris	LW	United States	Sioux Falls Stampede (USHL)
5	144^{3}	Yevgeni Volokhin	G	Russia	Mamonty Yugry (MHL)
6	165	Filip Eriksson	C	Sweden	Växjö Lakers (J20 Nationell)
7	197	Luke Mittelstadt	D	United States	University of Minnesota (B1G)

=== Notes ===
1. The Pittsburgh Penguins' fourth-round pick went to Montreal as the result of a trade on July 16, 2022, that sent Jeff Petry and Ryan Poehling to Pittsburgh in exchange for Mike Matheson and this pick.
2. The Vegas Golden Knights' fourth-round pick went to Montreal as the result of a trade on July 8, 2022, that sent Tampa Bay's fourth-round pick in 2022 to Vegas in exchange for this pick.
3. The Calgary Flames' fifth-round pick went to Montreal as the result of a trade on February 14, 2022, that sent Tyler Toffoli to Calgary in exchange for Tyler Pitlick, Emil Heineman, a conditional first-round pick in 2022, and this pick.
