= Esko Koppanen =

Finnish bank director and politician (1926–2002)

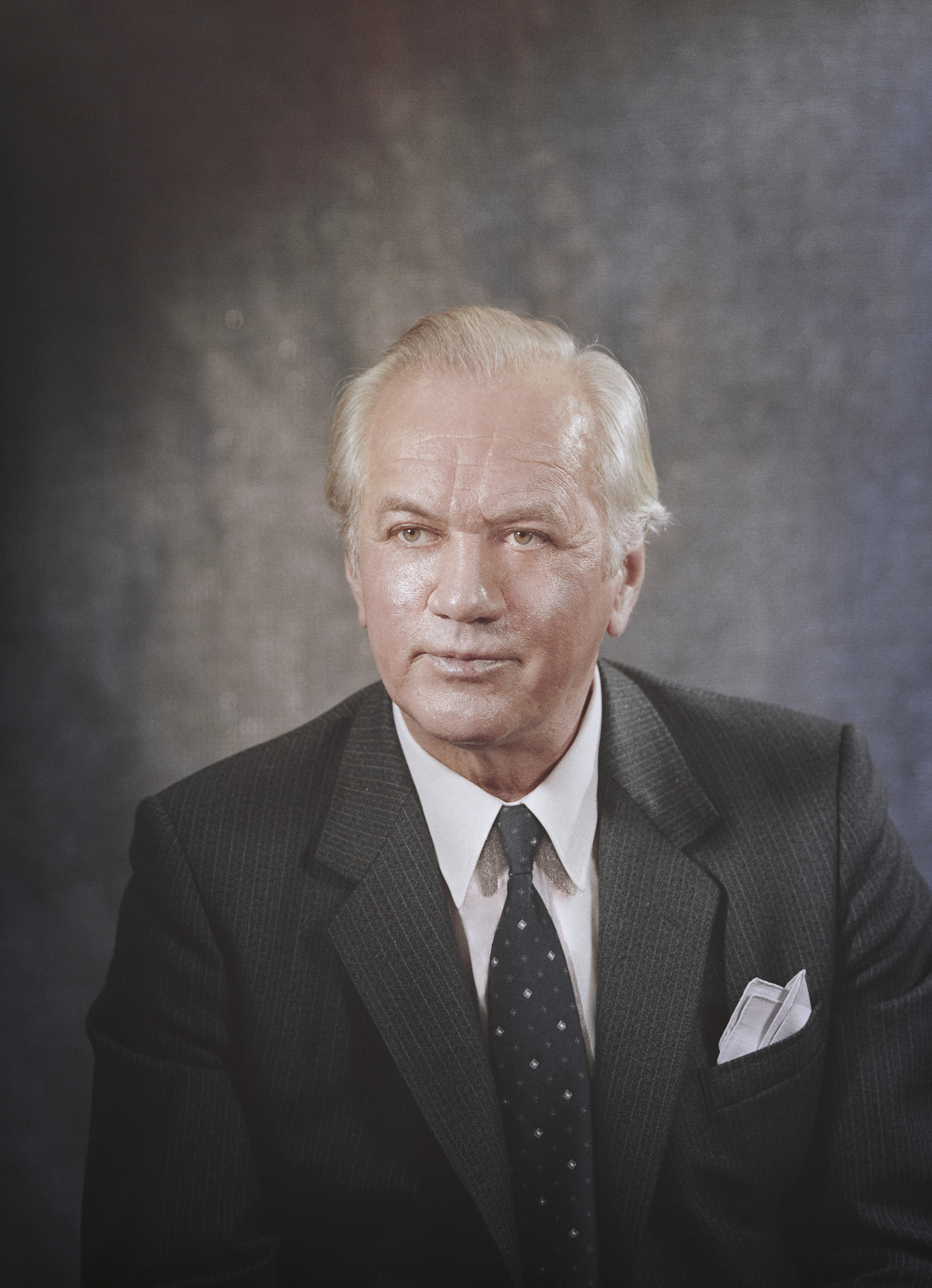
Esko Koppanen (1982)

Esko Jussi (Esko J.) Koppanen (19 December 1926 – 1 November 2002) was a Finnish bank director and politician, born in Sakkola. He was a member of the Parliament of Finland from 1962 to 1983, representing the National Coalition Party. He was a presidential elector in the 1968 and 1978 presidential elections.
