= Ilya Lyubushkin =

Russian ice hockey player (born 1994)

- Born: 6 April 1994 (age 32) Moscow, Russia
- Height: 6 ft 2 in (188 cm)
- Weight: 206 lb (93 kg; 14 st 10 lb)
- Position: Defence
- Shoots: Right
- NHL team Former teams: Nashville Predators; Lokomotiv Yaroslavl; Arizona Coyotes; Toronto Maple Leafs; Buffalo Sabres; Anaheim Ducks; Dallas Stars
- NHL draft: Undrafted
- Playing career: 2012–present

Ilya Nikolaevich Lyubushkin (Russian: Илья Николаевич Любушкин; born 6 April 1994) is a Russian professional ice hockey player who is a defenceman for the Nashville Predators of the National Hockey League (NHL). He previously played for the Arizona Coyotes, Buffalo Sabres, Toronto Maple Leafs, Anaheim Ducks, and Dallas Stars of the NHL and Lokomotiv Yaroslavl of the Kontinental Hockey League (KHL).

== Playing career ==
Lyubushkin began his career in Russia with Metallurg Novokuznetsk of the Supreme Hockey League (VHL). However, after the plane crash that killed many of the players from Lokomotiv Yaroslavl of the Kontinental Hockey League (KHL), a draft was held to repopulate the team and Lyubushkin was among those selected. Lyubushkin made his KHL debut playing with Lokomotiv Yaroslavl during the 2012–13 KHL season. He played his first five professional seasons with Lokomotiv Yaroslavl before opting to become a free agent following the 2017–18 season.

=== Arizona Coyotes ===
Lyubushkin signed a one-year, two-way contract with the Arizona Coyotes of the National Hockey League (NHL) on 23 May 2018. In his debut season in North America in the 2018–19 season, Lyubushkin remained on the Coyotes roster for the duration of the year, adding a defensive physical presence. He registered 4 assists in 41 games while finishing fourth on the team and third among all NHL rookies with 150 hits. On 14 June 2019, Lyubushkin was re-signed to a one-year contract to continue with the Arizona Coyotes. He scored four points in 51 games with the Coyotes during the 2019–20 season. As a restricted free agent, Lyubushkin returned for a third season with the Coyotes by agreeing to a one-year, $1 million contract extension on 5 October 2020. He was later returned on loan by the Coyotes to join former club, Lokomotiv Yaroslavl, until the commencement of NHL training camp on 28 October 2020. During the 2020–21 season, Lyubushkin scored his first NHL goal against Jonathan Quick in a 4–3 loss to the Los Angeles Kings on 8 April 2021.

=== Toronto Maple Leafs ===
On 19 February 2022, Lyubushkin was traded, along with teammate Ryan Dzingel, to the Toronto Maple Leafs in exchange for Nick Ritchie, and a choice of a third-round pick in 2023 or a second-round pick in 2025. Lyubushkin made his Maple Leafs debut on 22 February versus the Columbus Blue Jackets. He scored his first goal for the Maple Leafs on 14 April 2022, in a 7–3 win over the Washington Capitals. He made his Stanley Cup playoffs debut on 2 May in a 5–0 rout over the Tampa Bay Lightning, a game in which he fought Corey Perry. The Maple Leafs were eliminated by the Lightning in seven games in the first round.

=== Buffalo Sabres ===
On 13 July 2022, Lyubushkin was signed as an unrestricted free agent to a two-year, $5.5 million contract with the Buffalo Sabres. He made his debut in the season opener, a 4–1 win over the Ottawa Senators, registering his first point (an assist) for his new team. He scored his first goal for the Sabres in a memorable fashion on 23 February 2023. He scored the game winner in overtime, while shorthanded on a breakaway against Andrei Vasilevskiy in a 6–5 win over the Tampa Bay Lightning. It was the first shorthanded overtime goal in Sabres' history. In his first season with the Sabres, he set a career high in points with 14 while scoring 2 goals.

=== Anaheim Ducks ===
After one season in Buffalo, Lyubushkin was traded to the Anaheim Ducks on 18 August 2023, in exchange for a fourth-round pick in the 2025 draft (previously acquired in a deal for John Klingberg). He appeared in 55 games for Anaheim, recording four points. He was often paired with Anaheim's rookie defenceman Pavel Mintyukov.

=== Return to Toronto ===
On 29 February 2024, Lyubushkin was traded back to the Maple Leafs in a three-team deal involving the Carolina Hurricanes. In the trade, Anaheim acquired Toronto's third-round draft pick in the 2025 draft, while Carolina received Toronto's sixth-round draft pick in the 2024 draft. Toronto also acquired the rights to unsigned Carolina draft pick Kirill Slepets, who was playing with Amur Khabarovsk of the KHL at the time. He made his return with the Maple Leafs in a 4–3 victory over the New York Rangers on 2 March. However, in the second period, he took a hit from Matt Rempe and did not return to the game. He played in the following game against the Boston Bruins on 4 March, a 4–1 loss. However, Lyubushkin registered his first point with the Maple Leafs that season, assisting on Toronto's only goal by John Tavares. He finished with four points in 19 regular season games with the Maple Leafs. In the 2024 Stanley Cup playoffs, Lyubushkin registered three points in seven games as the Maple Leafs were eliminated by the Bruins in the first round.

=== Dallas Stars ===
An unrestricted free agent, on 1 July 2024, Lyubushkin signed a three-year, $9.75 million contract with the Dallas Stars.

=== Nashville Predators ===
On 1 July 2026, Lyubushkin and Mavrik Bourque were traded to the Nashville Predators in exchange for a 2027 2nd round and 2028 3rd round draft pick.

== International play ==
Medal record

Ice hockey

Representing Russia

World Junior Championships
| Bronze medal – third place | 2014 Sweden | |

Lyubushkin was selected to play for Russia at the 2014 World Junior Championships. Russia defeated Canada 2–1 to win the bronze medal at the tournament.

== Career statistics ==
=== Regular season and playoffs ===
| | | | Regular season | | | | | Playoffs |
| Season | Team | League | GP | G | A | Pts | PIM | GP | G | A | Pts | PIM |
|---|---|---|---|---|---|---|---|---|---|---|---|---|
| 2011–12 | Kuznetskie Medvedi | MHL | 26 | 0 | 1 | 1 | 34 | — | — | — | — | — |
| 2011–12 | Loko Yaroslavl | MHL | 21 | 3 | 1 | 4 | 26 | 3 | 1 | 0 | 1 | 2 |
| 2012–13 | Loko Yaroslavl | MHL | 4 | 0 | 0 | 0 | 0 | — | — | — | — | — |
| 2012–13 | Lokomotiv Yaroslavl-2 | VHL | 42 | 1 | 4 | 5 | 26 | 5 | 1 | 0 | 1 | 4 |
| 2013–14 | Lokomotiv Yaroslavl | KHL | 32 | 1 | 1 | 2 | 18 | 18 | 0 | 0 | 0 | 47 |
| 2013–14 | Loko Yaroslavl | MHL | 11 | 1 | 1 | 2 | 36 | — | — | — | — | — |
| 2014–15 | Lokomotiv Yaroslavl | KHL | 60 | 1 | 6 | 7 | 30 | 6 | 0 | 0 | 0 | 8 |
| 2015–16 | Lokomotiv Yaroslavl | KHL | 55 | 4 | 7 | 11 | 68 | 5 | 0 | 0 | 0 | 0 |
| 2016–17 | Lokomotiv Yaroslavl | KHL | 60 | 3 | 4 | 7 | 69 | 15 | 0 | 1 | 1 | 26 |
| 2017–18 | Lokomotiv Yaroslavl | KHL | 50 | 3 | 6 | 9 | 73 | 9 | 1 | 0 | 1 | 4 |
| 2018–19 | Arizona Coyotes | NHL | 41 | 0 | 4 | 4 | 13 | — | — | — | — | — |
| 2019–20 | Tucson Roadrunners | AHL | 2 | 0 | 0 | 0 | 2 | — | — | — | — | — |
| 2019–20 | Arizona Coyotes | NHL | 51 | 0 | 4 | 4 | 18 | — | — | — | — | — |
| 2020–21 | Lokomotiv Yaroslavl | KHL | 5 | 0 | 0 | 0 | 2 | — | — | — | — | — |
| 2020–21 | Arizona Coyotes | NHL | 42 | 1 | 1 | 2 | 10 | — | — | — | — | — |
| 2021–22 | Arizona Coyotes | NHL | 46 | 0 | 9 | 9 | 26 | — | — | — | — | — |
| 2021–22 | Toronto Maple Leafs | NHL | 31 | 2 | 4 | 6 | 25 | 7 | 0 | 1 | 1 | 18 |
| 2022–23 | Buffalo Sabres | NHL | 68 | 2 | 12 | 14 | 38 | — | — | — | — | — |
| 2023–24 | Anaheim Ducks | NHL | 55 | 0 | 4 | 4 | 51 | — | — | — | — | — |
| 2023–24 | Toronto Maple Leafs | NHL | 19 | 0 | 4 | 4 | 6 | 7 | 0 | 3 | 3 | 2 |
| 2024–25 | Dallas Stars | NHL | 80 | 1 | 3 | 4 | 32 | 14 | 0 | 3 | 3 | 4 |
| 2025–26 | Dallas Stars | NHL | 53 | 1 | 8 | 9 | 40 | 2 | 0 | 1 | 1 | 0 |
| KHL totals | | | 262 | 12 | 24 | 36 | 260 | 53 | 1 | 1 | 2 | 85 |
| NHL totals | | | 486 | 7 | 63 | 70 | 259 | 30 | 0 | 8 | 8 | 24 |

=== International ===
| Year | Team | Event | Result | GP | G | A | Pts | PIM |
|---|---|---|---|---|---|---|---|---|
| 2014 | Russia | WJC | 3rd place, bronze medalist(s) | 7 | 0 | 4 | 4 | 6 |
| Junior totals | | | | 7 | 0 | 4 | 4 | 6 |
