= Joona Koppanen =

Finnish ice hockey player (born 1998)

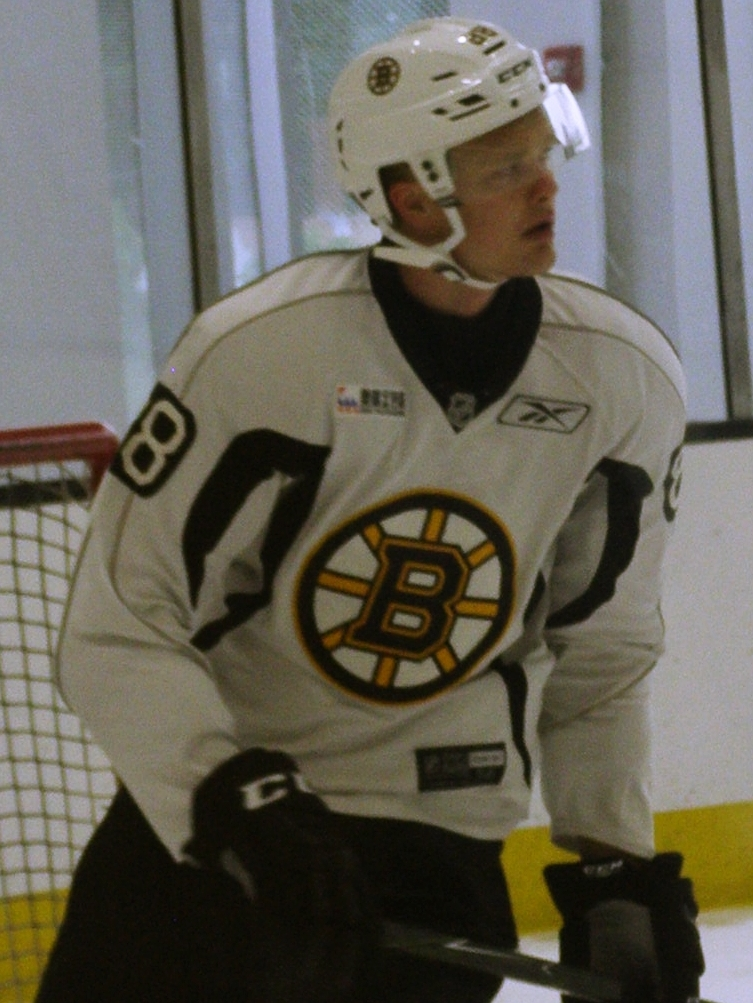
- Koppanen with the Boston Bruins in 2017
- Born: 25 February 1998 (age 28) Tampere, Finland
- Height: 6 ft 5 in (196 cm)
- Weight: 192 lb (87 kg; 13 st 10 lb)
- Position: Left wing
- Shoots: Left
- SHL team Former teams: Luleå HF; Ilves; Boston Bruins; Pittsburgh Penguins
- NHL draft: 135th overall, 2016; Boston Bruins
- Playing career: 2017–present

Joona Koppanen (born 25 February 1998) is a Finnish professional ice hockey forward for Luleå HF. Koppanen was drafted by the Boston Bruins, 135th overall, in the 2016 NHL entry draft.

== Playing career ==
Koppanen played his youth hockey in his native Finland within the local club, Ilves. In impressing through the Under-20 Junior A level, Koppanen was selected by the Boston Bruins in the fifth round, 135th overall, in the 2016 NHL entry draft.

On 14 April 2017, Koppanen was signed to a three-year, entry-level contract with the Boston Bruins. He was initially returned on loan by the Bruins to his original club, Ilves, to make his professional debut in the 2017–18 season. Appearing in 45 games, Koppanen collected 2 goals and 14 points with Tampere before suffering elimination. On 14 March 2018, he was reassigned to make his North American debut in joining the Bruins AHL affiliate in Providence.

Entering the final season of his entry-level contract with the Bruins, on 22 September 2020, with the North American season to be delayed, Koppanen was loaned by Boston to join his original Finnish youth club, KOOVEE of the Mestis, to begin the 2020–21 season. Showing his offensive acumen, Koppanen registered 6 goals and 17 points in 10 games before he was elevated on loan to affiliate and former club, Ilves of the Liiga, on 28 October 2020.

On 11 January 2023, Koppanen was recalled by the Bruins. He made his NHL debut against the Seattle Kraken on 12 January 2023. Koppanen collected his first NHL point on 22 January 2023, on a Nick Foligno goal against the San Jose Sharks. He was sent back down to the AHL after five games.

Leaving the Bruins organization after the season, Koppanen was signed as a free agent to a two-year, two-way contract with the Pittsburgh Penguins on 1 July 2023.

On 17 June 2025, Koppanen signed a one-year, two-way contract extension with the Penguins.

On 8 June 2026, Koppanen signed with Luleå HF.

== International play ==
Koppanen represented the Finland national under-20 team at the 2018 World Junior Ice Hockey Championships.

== Career statistics ==
=== Regular season and playoffs ===
| | | | Regular season | | | | | Playoffs |
| Season | Team | League | GP | G | A | Pts | PIM | GP | G | A | Pts | PIM |
|---|---|---|---|---|---|---|---|---|---|---|---|---|
| 2015–16 | Ilves | Jr. A | 40 | 9 | 17 | 26 | 14 | — | — | — | — | — |
| 2016–17 | Ilves | Jr. A | 38 | 23 | 31 | 54 | 18 | 6 | 2 | 4 | 6 | 2 |
| 2017–18 | Ilves | Liiga | 45 | 2 | 12 | 14 | 8 | — | — | — | — | — |
| 2017–18 | Providence Bruins | AHL | 10 | 2 | 0 | 2 | 0 | — | — | — | — | — |
| 2018–19 | Providence Bruins | AHL | 45 | 2 | 0 | 2 | 6 | — | — | — | — | — |
| 2018–19 | Atlanta Gladiators | ECHL | 7 | 0 | 1 | 1 | 4 | — | — | — | — | — |
| 2019–20 | Providence Bruins | AHL | 43 | 9 | 9 | 18 | 14 | — | — | — | — | — |
| 2019–20 | Atlanta Gladiators | ECHL | 5 | 1 | 4 | 5 | 2 | — | — | — | — | — |
| 2020–21 | KOOVEE | Mestis | 10 | 6 | 11 | 17 | 10 | — | — | — | — | — |
| 2020–21 | Ilves | Liiga | 13 | 3 | 2 | 5 | 2 | — | — | — | — | — |
| 2020–21 | Providence Bruins | AHL | 21 | 3 | 3 | 6 | 2 | — | — | — | — | — |
| 2021–22 | Providence Bruins | AHL | 62 | 11 | 19 | 30 | 20 | 2 | 0 | 1 | 1 | 0 |
| 2022–23 | Providence Bruins | AHL | 64 | 12 | 23 | 35 | 26 | 4 | 0 | 2 | 2 | 17 |
| 2022–23 | Boston Bruins | NHL | 5 | 0 | 1 | 1 | 4 | — | — | — | — | — |
| 2023–24 | Wilkes-Barre/Scranton Penguins | AHL | 58 | 6 | 15 | 21 | 22 | — | — | — | — | — |
| 2023–24 | Pittsburgh Penguins | NHL | 4 | 0 | 0 | 0 | 0 | — | — | — | — | — |
| 2024–25 | Wilkes-Barre/Scranton Penguins | AHL | 56 | 8 | 15 | 23 | 24 | 2 | 0 | 0 | 0 | 2 |
| 2024–25 | Pittsburgh Penguins | NHL | 11 | 1 | 0 | 1 | 0 | — | — | — | — | — |
| 2025–26 | Wilkes-Barre/Scranton Penguins | AHL | 44 | 8 | 17 | 25 | 12 | 15 | 2 | 2 | 4 | 24 |
| 2025–26 | Pittsburgh Penguins | NHL | 13 | 0 | 1 | 1 | 2 | — | — | — | — | — |
| Liiga totals | | | 58 | 5 | 14 | 19 | 10 | — | — | — | — | — |
| NHL totals | | | 33 | 1 | 2 | 3 | 6 | — | — | — | — | — |

=== International ===
| Year | Team | Event | Result | GP | G | A | Pts | PIM |
|---|---|---|---|---|---|---|---|---|
| 2014 | Finland | U17 | 4th | 6 | 1 | 0 | 1 | 2 |
| 2015 | Finland | IH18 | 4th | 5 | 1 | 0 | 1 | 0 |
| 2016 | Finland | U18 | 1st place, gold medalist(s) | 7 | 0 | 0 | 0 | 2 |
| 2018 | Finland | WJC | 6th | 5 | 3 | 1 | 4 | 0 |
| Junior totals | | | | 23 | 5 | 1 | 6 | 4 |

== Awards and honours ==
| Award | Year |
|---|---|
Jr. A
| First All-Star Team | 2017 |
| Saku Koivu Award | 2017 |
