= 2023–24 Vancouver Canucks season =

National Hockey League season

2023–24 Vancouver Canucks
- Pacific Division champions
- Division: 1st Pacific
- Conference: 3rd Western
- 2023–24 record: 50–23–9
- Home record: 27–9–5
- Road record: 23–14–4
- Goals for: 279
- Goals against: 223

Team information
- General manager: Patrik Allvin
- Coach: Rick Tocchet
- Captain: Quinn Hughes
- Alternate captains: J. T. Miller; Elias Pettersson
- Arena: Rogers Arena
- Average attendance: 18,824
- Minor league affiliates: Abbotsford Canucks (AHL); Kalamazoo Wings (ECHL)

Team leaders
- Goals: Brock Boeser (40)
- Assists: Quinn Hughes (75)
- Points: J. T. Miller (103)
- Penalty minutes: Nikita Zadorov (102)
- Plus/minus: Quinn Hughes (+38)
- Wins: Thatcher Demko (35)
- Goals against average: Thatcher Demko (2.45)

The 2023–24 Vancouver Canucks season was the 54th season for the National Hockey League (NHL) franchise that was established on May 22, 1970.

On March 30, 2024, the Canucks clinched a playoff spot for the first time since 2020, and their first in a 82-game season since 2015, after the San Jose Sharks defeated the St. Louis Blues. On April 16, 2024, the Canucks clinched the Pacific Division title for the first time in franchise history and their first franchise division title since winning the Northwest Division in 2013; following a 4–1 win over the Calgary Flames in their last regular season home game.

In game one of the playoffs in their first round series against the Nashville Predators, the Canucks played their first home playoff game at Rogers Arena since 2015, securing a 4–2 win over Nashville. The Canucks would go on to defeat the Predators in six games. In the second round, the Canucks faced the Edmonton Oilers, losing in seven games.

== Standings ==
=== Divisional standings ===
Pacific Division
Pos	Team	GP	W	L	OTL	RW	GF	GA	GD	Pts
1	y – Vancouver Canucks	82	50	23	9	44	279	223	+56	109
2	x – Edmonton Oilers	82	49	27	6	39	294	237	+57	104
3	x – Los Angeles Kings	82	44	27	11	37	256	215	+41	99
4	x – Vegas Golden Knights	82	45	29	8	34	267	245	+22	98
5	Calgary Flames	82	38	39	5	32	253	271	−18	81
6	Seattle Kraken	82	34	35	13	28	217	236	−19	81
7	Anaheim Ducks	82	27	50	5	21	204	295	−91	59
8	San Jose Sharks	82	19	54	9	14	181	331	−150	47

Source: National Hockey League
Rules for classification: 1) Fewer number of games played (GP, only during regular season); 2) Greater number of regulation wins (RW); 3) Greater number of wins in regulation and overtime, excluding shootout wins (ROW); 4) Greater number of total wins, including shootouts (W); 5) Greater number of points earned in head-to-head play; if teams played an uneven number of head-to-head games, the result of the first game on the home ice of the team with the extra home game is discarded; 6) Greater goal differential (GD); 7) Greater number of goals scored (GF)
x – Clinched playoff spot; y – Clinched division

=== Conference standings ===
Western Conference Wild Card
Pos	Div	Team	GP	W	L	OTL	RW	GF	GA	GD	Pts
1	CE	x – Nashville Predators	82	47	30	5	38	269	248	+21	99
2	PA	x – Vegas Golden Knights	82	45	29	8	34	267	245	+22	98
3	CE	St. Louis Blues	82	43	33	6	31	239	250	−11	92
4	CE	Minnesota Wild	82	39	34	9	32	251	263	−12	87
5	PA	Calgary Flames	82	38	39	5	32	253	271	−18	81
6	PA	Seattle Kraken	82	34	35	13	28	217	236	−19	81
7	CE	Arizona Coyotes	82	36	41	5	28	256	274	−18	77
8	PA	Anaheim Ducks	82	27	50	5	21	204	295	−91	59
9	CE	Chicago Blackhawks	82	23	53	6	17	179	290	−111	52
10	PA	San Jose Sharks	82	19	54	9	14	181	331	−150	47

Source: National Hockey League
Rules for classification: 1) Fewer number of games played (GP, only during regular season); 2) Greater number of regulation wins (RW); 3) Greater number of wins in regulation and overtime, excluding shootout wins (ROW); 4) Greater number of total wins, including shootouts (W); 5) Greater number of points earned in head-to-head play; if teams played an uneven number of head-to-head games, the result of the first game on the home ice of the team with the extra home game is discarded; 6) Greater goal differential (GD); 7) Greater number of goals scored (GF)
x – Clinched playoff spot

== Schedule and results ==
=== Preseason ===
The preseason schedule was released on June 23, 2023. Two weeks prior to the first preseason game, Quinn Hughes was named the new captain, replacing Bo Horvat, who was traded midway through the prior season.

2023 preseason game log: 2–3–1 (home: 2–1–0; road: 0–2–1)
#	Date	Visitor	Score	Home	OT	Decision	Attendance	Record	Recap
1	September 24	Vancouver	0–10	Calgary		Silovs	15,452	0–1–0
2	September 27	Vancouver	1–2	Edmonton	OT	DeSmith	16,700	0–1–1
3	September 28	Vancouver	1–3	Seattle		Demko	17,151	0–2–1
4	September 30	Edmonton	2–5	Vancouver		Demko	18,488	1–2–1
5^{[a]}	October 4	Seattle	2–1	Vancouver		DeSmith	6,563	1–3–1
6	October 6	Calgary	1–3	Vancouver		Demko	18,353	2–3–1
Notes:^{a} Game was played at Abbotsford Centre in Abbotsford, British Columbia.

=== Regular season ===
The regular season schedule was released on June 27, 2023.

2023–24 game log

October: 6–2–1 (Home: 3–0–1; Road: 3–2–0)
#	Date	Visitor	Score	Home	OT	Decision	Attendance	Record	Pts	Recap
1	October 11	Edmonton	1–8	Vancouver		Demko	18,706	1–0–0	2
2	October 14	Vancouver	4–3	Edmonton		DeSmith	18,347	2–0–0	4
3	October 17	Vancouver	0–2	Philadelphia		Demko	18,883	2–1–0	4
4	October 19	Vancouver	3–4	Tampa Bay		Demko	19,092	2–2–0	4
5	October 21	Vancouver	5–3	Florida		DeSmith	16,991	3–2–0	6
6	October 24	Vancouver	3–2	Nashville		Demko	17,159	4–2–0	8
7	October 27	St. Louis	0–5	Vancouver		Demko	18,548	5–2–0	10
8	October 28	NY Rangers	4–3	Vancouver	OT	DeSmith	18,483	5–2–1	11
9	October 31	Nashville	2–5	Vancouver		Demko	18,413	6–2–1	13

November: 9–6–0 (Home: 5–2–0; Road: 4–4–0)
#	Date	Visitor	Score	Home	OT	Decision	Attendance	Record	Pts	Recap
10	November 2	Vancouver	10–1	San Jose		Demko	10,719	7–2–1	15
11	November 4	Dallas	0–2	Vancouver		Demko	18,895	8–2–1	17
12	November 6	Edmonton	2–6	Vancouver		Demko	18,857	9–2–1	19
13	November 9	Vancouver	5–2	Ottawa		DeSmith	16,653	10–2–1	21
14	November 11	Vancouver	2–5	Toronto		Demko	19,107	10–3–1	21
15	November 12	Vancouver	5–2	Montreal		DeSmith	21,105	11–3–1	23
16	November 15	NY Islanders	3–4	Vancouver	OT	Demko	18,972	12–3–1	25
17	November 16	Vancouver	2–5	Calgary		DeSmith	17,501	12–4–1	25
18	November 18	Seattle	4–3	Vancouver		Demko	18,857	12–5–1	25
19	November 20	San Jose	1–3	Vancouver		Demko	18,718	13–5–1	27
20	November 22	Vancouver	2–5	Colorado		Demko	18,133	13–6–1	27
21	November 24	Vancouver	5–1	Seattle		Demko	17,151	14–6–1	29
22	November 25	Vancouver	3–4	San Jose		DeSmith	15,538	14–7–1	29
23	November 28	Anaheim	1–3	Vancouver		Demko	18,639	15–7–1	31
24	November 30	Vegas	4–1	Vancouver		Demko	18,856	15–8–1	31

December: 8–2–2 (Home: 5–2–0; Road: 3–0–2)
#	Date	Visitor	Score	Home	OT	Decision	Attendance	Record	Pts	Recap
25	December 2	Vancouver	4–3	Calgary		Demko	19,079	16–8–1	33
26	December 5	New Jersey	6–5	Vancouver		Demko	18,983	16–9–1	33
27	December 7	Minnesota	0–2	Vancouver		DeSmith	18,667	17–9–1	35
28	December 9	Carolina	3–4	Vancouver		Demko	18,586	18–9–1	37
29	December 12	Tampa Bay	1–4	Vancouver		Demko	18,771	19–9–1	39
30	December 14	Florida	0–4	Vancouver		Demko	18,873	20–9–1	41
31	December 16	Vancouver	1–2	Minnesota	SO	DeSmith	18,519	20–9–2	42
32	December 17	Vancouver	4–3	Chicago		Demko	19,302	21–9–2	44
33	December 19	Vancouver	5–2	Nashville		DeSmith	17,159	22–9–2	46
34	December 21	Vancouver	3–4	Dallas	OT	Demko	18,532	22–9–3	47
35	December 23	San Jose	4–7	Vancouver		Demko	18,875	23–9–3	49
36	December 28	Philadelphia	4–1	Vancouver		DeSmith	18,986	23–10–3	49

January: 10–1–2 (Home: 5–0–1; Road: 5–1–1)
#	Date	Visitor	Score	Home	OT	Decision	Attendance	Record	Pts	Recap
37	January 2	Ottawa	3–6	Vancouver		Demko	18,810	24–10–3	51
38	January 4	Vancouver	1–2	St. Louis		Demko	18,096	24–11–3	51
39	January 6	Vancouver	6–4	New Jersey		Demko	16,157	25–11–3	53
40	January 8	Vancouver	6–3	NY Rangers		Demko	18,006	26–11–3	55
41	January 9	Vancouver	5–2	NY Islanders		DeSmith	15,690	27–11–3	57
42	January 11	Vancouver	4–3	Pittsburgh	OT	Demko	18,190	28–11–3	59
43	January 13	Vancouver	1–0	Buffalo		Demko	17,662	29–11–3	61
44	January 15	Vancouver	3–4	Columbus	SO	DeSmith	17,622	29–11–4	62
45	January 18	Arizona	1–2	Vancouver		Demko	19,005	30–11–4	64
46	January 20	Toronto	4–6	Vancouver		Demko	18,865	31–11–4	66
47	January 22	Chicago	0–2	Vancouver		Demko	18,714	32–11–4	68
48	January 24	St. Louis	4–3	Vancouver	OT	DeSmith	19,003	32–11–5	69
49	January 27	Columbus	4–5	Vancouver	OT	Demko	19,002	33–11–5	71

February: 5–6–2 (Home: 2–2–1; Road: 3–4–1)
#	Date	Visitor	Score	Home	OT	Decision	Attendance	Record	Pts	Recap
50	February 6	Vancouver	3–2	Carolina		Demko	18,700	34–11–5	73
51	February 8	Vancouver	0–4	Boston		Demko	17,850	34–12–5	73
52	February 10	Vancouver	3–4	Detroit	OT	DeSmith	19,515	34–12–6	74
53	February 11	Vancouver	3–2	Washington	OT	Demko	18,573	35–12–6	76
54	February 13	Vancouver	4–2	Chicago		Demko	16,452	36–12–6	78
55	February 15	Detroit	1–4	Vancouver		Demko	18,947	37–12–6	80
56	February 17	Winnipeg	4–2	Vancouver		Demko	18,992	37–13–6	80
57	February 19	Vancouver	7–10	Minnesota		DeSmith	19,024	37–14–6	80
58	February 20	Vancouver	1–3	Colorado		Demko	18,121	37–15–6	80
59	February 22	Vancouver	2–5	Seattle		Demko	17,151	37–16–6	80
60	February 24	Boston	2–3	Vancouver	OT	Demko	18,924	38–16–6	82
61	February 27	Pittsburgh	4–3	Vancouver	OT	Demko	18,730	38–16–7	83
62	February 29	Los Angeles	5–1	Vancouver		Demko	18,801	38–17–7	83

March: 8–3–1 (Home: 5–3–1; Road: 3–0–0)
#	Date	Visitor	Score	Home	OT	Decision	Attendance	Record	Pts	Recap
63	March 3	Vancouver	2–1	Anaheim		DeSmith	15,161	39–17–7	85
64	March 5	Vancouver	2–1	Los Angeles	OT	Demko	18,145	40–17–7	87
65	March 7	Vancouver	3–1	Vegas		Demko	18,054	41–17–7	89
66	March 9	Winnipeg	0–5	Vancouver		Demko	18,954	42–17–7	91
67	March 13	Colorado	4–3	Vancouver	OT	DeSmith	18,880	42–17–8	92
68	March 16	Washington	2–1	Vancouver		DeSmith	18,859	42–18–8	92
69	March 19	Buffalo	2–3	Vancouver		DeSmith	18,733	43–18–8	94
70	March 21	Montreal	1–4	Vancouver		DeSmith	18,804	44–18–8	96
71	March 23	Calgary	2–4	Vancouver		DeSmith	18,903	45–18–8	98
72	March 25	Los Angeles	3–2	Vancouver		DeSmith	18,870	45–19–8	98
73	March 28	Dallas	3–1	Vancouver		DeSmith	18,987	45–20–8	98
74	March 31	Anaheim	2–3	Vancouver		Silovs	18,735	46–20–8	100

April: 4–3–1 (Home: 2–0–1; Road: 2–3–0)
#	Date	Visitor	Score	Home	OT	Decision	Attendance	Record	Pts	Recap
75	April 2	Vancouver	3–6	Vegas		DeSmith	18,366	46–21–8	100
76	April 3	Vancouver	2–1	Arizona		Silovs	4,600	47–21–8	102
77	April 6	Vancouver	3–6	Los Angeles		DeSmith	18,190	47–22–8	102
78	April 8	Vegas	3–4	Vancouver		Silovs	18,899	48–22–8	104
79	April 10	Arizona	4–3	Vancouver	OT	Silovs	18,856	48–22–9	105
80	April 13	Vancouver	3–1	Edmonton		DeSmith	18,347	49–22–9	107
81	April 16	Calgary	1–4	Vancouver		Demko	18,918	50–22–9	109
82	April 18	Vancouver	2–4	Winnipeg		Demko	15,225	50–23–9	109

Legend: Win (2 points) Loss (0 points) Overtime/shootout loss (1 point)

=== Playoffs ===
2024 Stanley Cup playoffs

Western Conference first round vs. (WC1) Nashville Predators: Vancouver won 4–2
#	Date	Visitor	Score	Home	OT	Decision	Attendance	Series	Recap
1	April 21	Nashville	2–4	Vancouver		Demko	18,967	1–0
2	April 23	Nashville	4–1	Vancouver		DeSmith	18,960	1–1
3	April 26	Vancouver	2–1	Nashville		DeSmith	17,474	2–1
4	April 28	Vancouver	4–3	Nashville	OT	Silovs	17,590	3–1
5	April 30	Nashville	2–1	Vancouver		Silovs	19,036	3–2
6	May 3	Vancouver	1–0	Nashville		Silovs	17,682	4–2

Western Conference second round vs. (P2) Edmonton Oilers: Edmonton won 4–3
#	Date	Visitor	Score	Home	OT	Decision	Attendance	Series	Recap
1	May 8	Edmonton	4–5	Vancouver		Silovs	18,823	1–0
2	May 10	Edmonton	4–3	Vancouver	OT	Silovs	18,985	1–1
3	May 12	Vancouver	4–3	Edmonton		Silovs	18,347	2–1
4	May 14	Vancouver	2–3	Edmonton		Silovs	18,347	2–2
5	May 16	Edmonton	2–3	Vancouver		Silovs	19,052	3–2
6	May 18	Vancouver	1–5	Edmonton		Silovs	18,347	3–3
7	May 20	Edmonton	3–2	Vancouver		Silovs	19,016	3–4

Legend: Win Loss

== Player statistics ==
=== Skaters ===
Regular season
Player	GP	G	A	Pts	+/−	PIM
J. T. Miller	81	37	66	103	+32	58
Quinn Hughes	82	17	75	92	+38	38
Elias Pettersson	82	34	55	89	+20	12
Brock Boeser	81	40	33	73	+23	14
Filip Hronek	81	5	43	48	+33	38
Conor Garland	82	20	27	47	+19	35
Nils Hoglander	80	24	12	36	+23	51
Dakota Joshua	63	18	14	32	+19	60
Ilya Mikheyev	78	11	20	31	+1	4
Pius Suter	67	14	15	29	+17	16
Tyler Myers	77	5	24	29	+16	77
Teddy Blueger	68	6	22	28	+4	31
Sam Lafferty	79	13	11	24	+4	32
Andrei Kuzmenko^{‡}	43	8	13	21	−1	6
Nikita Zadorov^{†}	54	5	9	14	+6	102
Elias Lindholm^{†}	26	6	6	12	−6	4
Ian Cole	78	2	9	11	+10	61
Phillip Di Giuseppe	51	5	5	10	−1	36
Anthony Beauvillier^{‡}	22	2	6	8	+8	4
Nils Aman	43	3	4	7	−3	8
Noah Juulsen	54	1	6	7	−1	22
Carson Soucy	40	2	4	6	+10	12
Vasily Podkolzin	19	0	2	2	−4	8
Jack Studnicka^{‡}	5	1	0	1	+2	0
Mark Friedman^{†}	23	0	1	1	+4	21
Cole McWard	1	0	0	0	0	0
Akito Hirose	3	0	0	0	+1	0
Arshdeep Bains	8	0	0	0	−5	6
Linus Karlsson	4	0	0	0	0	0

Playoffs
Player	GP	G	A	Pts	+/−	PIM
Brock Boeser	12	7	5	12	+2	8
J. T. Miller	13	3	9	12	+5	8
Elias Lindholm	13	5	5	10	+4	4
Quinn Hughes	13	0	10	10	+1	6
Dakota Joshua	13	4	4	8	+1	10
Nikita Zadorov	13	4	4	8	+3	26
Elias Pettersson	13	1	5	6	0	2
Conor Garland	13	3	2	5	0	2
Carson Soucy	12	1	4	5	+1	6
Pius Suter	13	2	1	3	+2	6
Nils Hoglander	11	1	1	2	−2	2
Filip Hronek	13	1	1	2	−3	6
Phillip Di Giuseppe	11	1	1	2	+1	2
Teddy Blueger	13	0	2	2	−3	6
Ian Cole	13	0	2	2	−3	6
Tyler Myers	12	0	1	1	+1	6
Nils Aman	5	0	0	0	0	0
Ilya Mikheyev	11	0	0	0	−4	0
Vasily Podkolzin	2	0	0	0	+1	10
Linus Karlsson	2	0	0	0	−1	2
Noah Juulsen	2	0	0	0	−1	4
Sam Lafferty	11	0	0	0	−2	2

=== Goaltenders ===
Regular season
Player	GP	GS	TOI	W	L	OT	GA	GAA	SA	SV%	SO	G	A	PIM
Thatcher Demko	51	51	3,015:53	35	14	2	123	2.45	1,492	.918	5	0	1	0
Casey DeSmith	29	27	1,663:29	12	9	6	80	2.89	759	.896	1	0	1	0
Arturs Silovs	4	4	243:13	3	0	1	10	2.47	84	.881	0	0	0	0

Playoffs
Player	GP	GS	TOI	W	L	GA	GAA	SA	SV%	SO	G	A	PIM
Arturs Silovs	10	10	598:18	5	5	29	2.91	283	.898	1	0	0	0
Thatcher Demko	1	1	60:00	1	0	2	2.00	24	.917	0	0	0	0
Casey DeSmith	2	2	118:58	1	1	4	2.02	45	.911	0	0	0	0

^{†}Denotes player spent time with another team before joining the Canucks. Stats reflect time with the Canucks only.
^{‡}Denotes player was traded mid-season. Stats reflect time with the Canucks only.
Bold/italics denotes franchise record.

== Awards and honours ==
=== Awards ===
Regular season
Player	Award	Awarded	Ref
Elias Pettersson	NHL Second Star of the Week	October 16, 2023	
Elias Pettersson	NHL Second Star of the Month	November 1, 2023	
Quinn Hughes	NHL First Star of the Week	November 6, 2023	
Quinn Hughes	NHL Third Star of the Month	December 1, 2023	
Thatcher Demko	NHL Second Star of the Week	December 18, 2023	
Quinn Hughes	NHL All-Star game selection	January 4, 2024	
J.T. Miller	NHL All-Star game selection	January 13, 2024	
Brock Boeser	NHL All-Star game selection	January 13, 2024	
Thatcher Demko	NHL All-Star game selection	January 13, 2024	
Elias Pettersson	NHL All-Star game selection	January 13, 2024	
Elias Pettersson	NHL First Star of the Week	January 15, 2024	
Elias Pettersson	NHL Third Star of the Month	February 1, 2024	
Thatcher Demko	NHL Third Star of the Week	March 11, 2024	
Rick Tocchet	Jack Adams Award	May 22, 2024	
Quinn Hughes	James Norris Memorial Trophy	June 27, 2024	

=== Milestones ===
Regular season
Player	Milestone	Reached	Ref
Brock Boeser	4th career NHL hat-trick	October 11, 2023	
Brock Boeser	400th career NHL game	October 14, 2023	
Elias Pettersson	2nd career NHL hat-trick	October 31, 2023	
Anthony Beauvillier	500th career NHL game	November 2, 2023	
Elias Pettersson	200th career NHL assist	November 2, 2023	
Ilya Mikheyev	200th career NHL game	November 6, 2023	
Linus Karlsson	1st career NHL game	November 16, 2023	
Quinn Hughes	300th career NHL game	November 16, 2023	
Andrei Kuzmenko	100th career NHL game	November 22, 2023	
Teddy Blueger	100th career NHL point	November 24, 2023	
Conor Garland	200th career NHL point	November 24, 2023	
Brock Boeser	5th career NHL hat-trick	December 12, 2023	
Thatcher Demko	100th career NHL win	January 6, 2024	
Thatcher Demko	200th career NHL game	January 18, 2024	
Teddy Blueger	300th career NHL game	January 20, 2024	
Pius Suter	100th career NHL point	January 22, 2024	
Quinn Hughes	300th career NHL point	January 24, 2024	
J.T. Miller	600th career NHL point	January 24, 2024	
Pius Suter	2nd career NHL hat-trick	January 24, 2024	
Noah Juulsen	100th career NHL game	January 27, 2024	
Brock Boeser	6th career NHL hat-trick	January 27, 2024	
Ian Cole	800th career NHL game	February 11, 2024	
Nils Aman	100th career NHL game	February 17, 2024	
Arshdeep Bains	1st career NHL game	February 20, 2024	
Filip Hronek	200th career NHL point	February 24, 2024	
Nils Hoglander	200th career NHL game	February 27, 2024	
Brock Boeser	200th career NHL assist	March 5, 2024	
Elias Pettersson	400th career NHL point	March 7, 2024	
Elias Pettersson	400th career NHL game	April 2, 2024	
Conor Garland	400th career NHL game 100th career NHL goal	April 8, 2024	
J.T. Miller	400th career NHL assist	April 8, 2024	

Playoffs
Player	Milestone	Reached	Ref
Pius Suter	1st career NHL playoff game 1st career NHL playoff goal 1st career NHL playoff point	April 21, 2024	
Filip Hronek	1st career NHL playoff game	April 21, 2024	
Nils Höglander	1st career NHL playoff game	April 21, 2024	
Dakota Joshua	1st career NHL playoff assist 1st career NHL playoff goal 1st career NHL playoff point	April 21, 2024	
Noah Juulsen	1st career NHL playoff game	April 23, 2024	
Phillip Di Giuseppe	1st career NHL playoff assist 1st career NHL playoff point	April 23, 2024	
Casey DeSmith	1st career NHL playoff win	April 26, 2024	
Artūrs Šilovs	1st career NHL playoff game 1st career NHL playoff start 1st career NHL playoff win	April 28, 2024	
Brock Boeser	1st career NHL playoff hat-trick	April 28, 2024	
Artūrs Šilovs	1st career NHL playoff shutout	May 3, 2024	
Nils Höglander	1st career NHL playoff assist 1st career NHL playoff point	May 8, 2024	
Nils Åman	1st career NHL playoff game	May 12, 2024	
Linus Karlsson	1st career NHL playoff game	May 12, 2024	
Pius Suter	1st career NHL playoff assist	May 12, 2024	
Vasily Podkolzin	1st career NHL playoff game	May 16, 2024	
Phillip Di Giuseppe	1st career NHL playoff goal	May 16, 2024	
Nils Höglander	1st career NHL playoff goal	May 18, 2024	
Filip Hronek	1st career NHL playoff assist 1st career NHL playoff point	May 18, 2024	
Filip Hronek	1st career NHL playoff goal	May 20, 2024	

=== Records ===
Regular season
Player	Record	Date	Ref
Quinn Hughes	Second defenceman in Canucks history to record a five-point game	November 2, 2023	

== Transactions ==
The Canucks have been involved in the following transactions during the 2023–24 season.

Key:

† Contract is entry-level.
‡ Contract initially takes effect in the 2024–25 season.

=== Trades ===
Date	Details		Ref
September 19, 2023	To Montreal Canadiens Tanner Pearson; 3rd-round pick in 2025	To Vancouver Canucks Casey DeSmith	
October 8, 2023	To Toronto Maple Leafs 5th-round pick in 2024	To Vancouver Canucks Sam Lafferty	
October 17, 2023	To Pittsburgh Penguins Jack Rathbone; Karel Plasek	To Vancouver Canucks Mark Friedman; Ty Glover	
November 28, 2023	To Chicago Blackhawks Anthony Beauvillier	To Vancouver Canucks conditional 5th-round pick in 2024	
November 30, 2023	To Calgary Flames conditional 5th-round pick in 2024; 3rd-round pick in 2026	To Vancouver Canucks Nikita Zadorov	
December 15, 2023	To San Jose Sharks Jack Studnicka	To Vancouver Canucks Nick Cicek; 6th-round pick in 2024	
January 31, 2024	To Calgary Flames Hunter Brzustewicz; Joni Jurmo; Andrei Kuzmenko; 1st-round pick in 2024 conditional 4th-round pick in 2024	To Vancouver Canucks Elias Lindholm	
June 26, 2024	To Chicago Blackhawks Sam Lafferty; Ilya Mikheyev*; 2nd-round pick in 2027	To Vancouver Canucks 4th-round pick in 2027	

Notes

- Canucks retain 15% of Mikheyev's remaining salary.

=== Players acquired ===
Date	Player	Former team	Term	Via	Ref
July 1, 2023	Teddy Blueger	Vegas Golden Knights	1-year	Free agency	
July 1, 2023	Ian Cole	Tampa Bay Lightning	1-year	Free agency	
July 1, 2023	Matt Irwin	Washington Capitals	1-year	Free agency	
July 1, 2023	Tristen Nielsen	Abbotsford Canucks (AHL)	2-year†	Free agency	
July 1, 2023	Zach Sawchenko	San Jose Sharks	1-year	Free agency	
July 1, 2023	Carson Soucy	Seattle Kraken	3-year	Free agency	
August 11, 2023	Pius Suter	Detroit Red Wings	2-year	Free agency	
March 14, 2024	Christian Felton	Merrimack College (Hockey East)	1-year†	Free agency	

=== Players lost ===
Date	Player	New team	Term	Via	Ref
July 1, 2023	Brady Keeper	Montreal Canadiens	1-year	Free agency	
July 1, 2023	Justin Dowling	New Jersey Devils	2-year	Free agency	
July 1, 2023	Kyle Burroughs	San Jose Sharks	3-year	Free agency	
July 1, 2023	Collin Delia	Winnipeg Jets	1-year	Free agency	
July 1, 2023	John Stevens	Abbotsford Canucks (AHL)	2-year	Free agency	
July 12, 2023	Travis Dermott	Arizona Coyotes	1-year	Free agency	
September 29, 2023	Spencer Martin	Columbus Blue Jackets		Waivers	

=== Signings ===
Date	Player	Term	Ref
June 30, 2023	Noah Juulsen	2-year	
July 2, 2023	Akito Hirose	2-year	
July 9, 2023	Nils Hoglander	2-year	
September 24, 2023	Sawyer Mynio	3-year†	
September 25, 2023	Ty Young	3-year†	
November 24, 2023	Nils Aman	2-year‡	
March 2, 2024	Elias Pettersson	8-year‡	
March 30, 2024	Ty Mueller	3-year†	
June 18, 2024	Filip Hronek	8–year‡	
June 19, 2024	Mark Friedman	1–year‡	
June 20, 2024	Linus Karlsson	1–year‡	
June 20, 2024	Cole McWard	1–year‡	
June 26, 2024	Teddy Blueger	2–year‡	
June 27, 2024	Dakota Joshua	4–year‡	
June 27, 2024	Tyler Myers	3–year‡	

== Draft picks ==
Below are the Vancouver Canucks' selections at the 2023 NHL entry draft, which was held on June 28 to 29, 2023, at Bridgestone Arena in Nashville.

Round	#	Player	Pos	Nationality	College/Junior/Club (League)
1	11	Tom Willander	D	Sweden	Rögle BK (J20 Nationell)
3	75	Hunter Brzustewicz	D	United States	Kitchener Rangers (OHL)
3	89 (Note: The Toronto Maple Leafs' third-round pick will go to the Vancouver Canucks as the result of a trade on February 28, 2023, that sent Luke Schenn to Toronto in exchange for this pick.)	Sawyer Mynio	D	Canada	Seattle Thunderbirds (WHL)
4	105 (Note: The Detroit Red Wings' fourth-round pick will go to the Vancouver Canucks as the result of a trade on March 1, 2023 that sent the Islanders' conditional first-round pick and a second-round pick both in 2023 to Detroit in exchange for Filip Hronek and this pick.)	Ty Mueller	C	Canada	Nebraska-Omaha Mavericks (NCHC)
4	107	Vilmer Alriksson	LW	Sweden	Djurgårdens IF (J20 Nationell)
4	119 (Note: The New York Rangers' fourth-round pick will go to the Vancouver Canucks as the result of a trade on March 21, 2022, that sent Tyler Motte to New York in exchange for this pick.)	Matthew Perkins	C	Canada	Youngstown Phantoms (USHL)
6	171	Aiden Celebrini	D	Canada	Brooks Bandits (AJHL)
