= 2023–24 New Jersey Devils season =

National Hockey League season

2023–24 New Jersey Devils
- Division: 7th Metropolitan
- Conference: 13th Eastern
- 2023–24 record: 38–39–5
- Home record: 17–21–3
- Road record: 21–18–2
- Goals for: 264
- Goals against: 283

Team information
- General manager: Tom Fitzgerald
- Coach: Lindy Ruff (Oct. 12 – Mar. 4); Travis Green (Mar. 4 – Apr. 15)
- Captain: Nico Hischier
- Alternate captains: Jack Hughes; Ondřej Palát
- Arena: Prudential Center
- Average attendance: 16,280
- Minor league affiliates: Utica Comets (AHL); Adirondack Thunder (ECHL)

Team leaders
- Goals: Timo Meier (28)
- Assists: Jesper Bratt (56)
- Points: Jesper Bratt (83)
- Penalty minutes: Kevin Bahl (82)
- Plus/minus: Curtis Lazar; Colin Miller (+10)
- Wins: Vítek Vaněček (17)
- Goals against average: Kaapo Kähkönen (2.51)

The 2023–24 New Jersey Devils season was the 50th season for the National Hockey League (NHL) franchise that was established on June 11, 1974, and 42nd season since the franchise relocated from Colorado prior to the 1982–83 NHL season.

The Devils participated in the 2024 NHL Stadium Series at MetLife Stadium in East Rutherford, New Jersey, where they hosted Philadelphia Flyers on February 17, 2024, winning the game 6–3.

On March 4, the Devils, who had a 30–27–4 record and were out of playoff contention, fired head coach Lindy Ruff, and replaced him with Travis Green.

On April 9, the Devils were eliminated from playoff contention following a 5–2 loss to the Toronto Maple Leafs.

== Standings ==
=== Divisional standings ===
Metropolitan Division
Pos	Team	GP	W	L	OTL	RW	GF	GA	GD	Pts
1	p – New York Rangers	82	55	23	4	43	282	229	+53	114
2	x – Carolina Hurricanes	82	52	23	7	44	279	216	+63	111
3	x – New York Islanders	82	39	27	16	29	246	263	−17	94
4	x – Washington Capitals	82	40	31	11	32	220	257	−37	91
5	Pittsburgh Penguins	82	38	32	12	32	255	251	+4	88
6	Philadelphia Flyers	82	38	33	11	30	235	261	−26	87
7	New Jersey Devils	82	38	39	5	33	264	283	−19	81
8	Columbus Blue Jackets	82	27	43	12	21	237	300	−63	66

Source: National Hockey League
Rules for classification: 1) Fewer number of games played (GP, only during regular season); 2) Greater number of regulation wins (RW); 3) Greater number of wins in regulation and overtime, excluding shootout wins (ROW); 4) Greater number of total wins, including shootouts (W); 5) Greater number of points earned in head-to-head play; if teams played an uneven number of head-to-head games, the result of the first game on the home ice of the team with the extra home game is discarded; 6) Greater goal differential (GD); 7) Greater number of goals scored (GF)
p – Clinched Presidents' Trophy; x – Clinched playoff spot

=== Conference standings ===
Eastern Conference Wild Card
Pos	Div	Team	GP	W	L	OTL	RW	GF	GA	GD	Pts
1	AT	x – Tampa Bay Lightning	82	45	29	8	37	291	268	+23	98
2	ME	x – Washington Capitals	82	40	31	11	32	220	257	−37	91
3	AT	Detroit Red Wings	82	41	32	9	27	278	274	+4	91
4	ME	Pittsburgh Penguins	82	38	32	12	32	255	251	+4	88
5	ME	Philadelphia Flyers	82	38	33	11	30	235	261	−26	87
6	AT	Buffalo Sabres	82	39	37	6	33	246	244	+2	84
7	ME	New Jersey Devils	82	38	39	5	33	264	283	−19	81
8	AT	Ottawa Senators	82	37	41	4	25	255	281	−26	78
9	AT	Montreal Canadiens	82	30	36	16	20	236	289	−53	76
10	ME	Columbus Blue Jackets	82	27	43	12	21	237	300	−63	66

Source: National Hockey League
Rules for classification: 1) Fewer number of games played (GP, only during regular season); 2) Greater number of regulation wins (RW); 3) Greater number of wins in regulation and overtime, excluding shootout wins (ROW); 4) Greater number of total wins, including shootouts (W); 5) Greater number of points earned in head-to-head play; if teams played an uneven number of head-to-head games, the result of the first game on the home ice of the team with the extra home game is discarded; 6) Greater goal differential (GD); 7) Greater number of goals scored (GF)
x – Clinched playoff spot

== Schedule and results ==
=== Preseason ===
The preseason schedule was published on June 22, 2023.

2023 preseason game log: 7–0–0 (home: 3–0–0; road: 4–0–0)
#	Date	Visitor	Score	Home	OT	Decision	Attendance	Record	Recap
1^{[A]}	September 25	New Jersey	4–2	Montreal		Schmid	20,129	1–0–0
2^{[A]}	September 25	Philadelphia	0–6	New Jersey		Vaněček	8,532	2–0–0
3	September 28	New Jersey	3–2	NY Rangers		Källgren	16,310	3–0–0
4	September 30	New Jersey	3–2	Philadelphia	OT	Vaněček	12,855	4–0–0
5	October 2	NY Islanders	5–6	New Jersey		Schmid	8,811	5–0–0
6	October 4	NY Rangers	2–5	New Jersey		Vaněček	14,028	6–0–0
7	October 6	New Jersey	3–0	NY Islanders		Schmid	10,978	7–0–0
Notes:^{A} Indicates split-squad.

=== Regular season ===
The regular season schedule was published on June 27, 2023.

2023–24 game log

October: 5–2–1 (home: 3–2–1; road: 2–0–0)
#	Date	Visitor	Score	Home	OT	Decision	Attendance	Record	Pts	Recap
1	October 12	Detroit	3–4	New Jersey		Vanecek	16,514	1–0–0	2
2	October 13	Arizona	4–3	New Jersey	SO	Schmid	16,514	1–0–1	3
3	October 16	Florida	4–3	New Jersey		Vaněček	15,023	1–1–1	3
4	October 20	New Jersey	5–4	NY Islanders	OT	Schmid	17,255	2–1–1	5
5	October 24	New Jersey	5–2	Montreal		Vaněček	21,105	3–1–1	7
6	October 25	Washington	6–4	New Jersey		Vaněček	16,117	3–2–1	7
7	October 27	Buffalo	4–5	New Jersey		Vaněček	16,514	4–2–1	9
8	October 29	Minnesota	3–4	New Jersey		Vaněček	16,514	5–2–1	11

November: 6–7–0 (home: 2–3–0; road: 4–4–0)
#	Date	Visitor	Score	Home	OT	Decision	Attendance	Record	Pts	Recap
9	November 2	New Jersey	5–3	Minnesota		Vanecek	18,399	6–2–1	13
10	November 3	New Jersey	1–4	St. Louis		Schmid	18,096	6–3–1	13
11	November 5	New Jersey	4–2	Chicago		Vaněček	18,388	7–3–1	15
12	November 7	New Jersey	3–6	Colorado		Vaněček	18,087	7–4–1	15
13	November 10	Washington	4–2	New Jersey		Schmid	16,514	7–5–1	15
14	November 14	New Jersey	3–6	Winnipeg		Schmid	11,717	7–6–1	15
15	November 16	New Jersey	5–2	Pittsburgh		Vaněček	18,321	8–6–1	17
16	November 18	NY Rangers	5–3	New Jersey		Vaněček	17,086	8–7–1	17
17	November 22	New Jersey	0–4	Detroit		Vaněček	19,515	8–8–1	17
18	November 24	Columbus	2–1	New Jersey		Schmid	16,514	8–9–1	17
19	November 25	Buffalo	2–7	New Jersey		Vaněček	16,514	9–9–1	19
20	November 28	NY Islanders	4–5	New Jersey		Schmid	16,091	10–9–1	21
21	November 30	New Jersey	4–3	Philadelphia	OT	Schmid	17,748	11–9–1	23

December: 8–5–1 (home: 3–3–1; road: 5–2–0)
#	Date	Visitor	Score	Home	OT	Decision	Attendance	Record	Pts	Recap
22	December 1	San Jose	6–3	New Jersey		Schmid	16,528	11–10–1	23
23	December 5	New Jersey	6–5	Vancouver		Vanecek	18,983	12–10–1	25
24	December 7	New Jersey	2–1	Seattle		Schmid	17,151	13–10–1	27
25	December 9	New Jersey	4–2	Calgary		Vaněček	17,597	14–10–1	29
26	December 10	New Jersey	1–4	Edmonton		Schmid	18,347	14–11–1	29
27	December 13	Boston	1–2	New Jersey	OT	Vaněček	16,514	15–11–1	31
28	December 16	New Jersey	6–3	Columbus		Schmid	18,172	16–11–1	33
29	December 17	Anaheim	5–1	New Jersey		Schmid	16,514	16–12–1	33
30	December 19	Philadelphia	3–2	New Jersey	OT	Vaněček	16,514	16–12–2	34
31	December 21	Edmonton	6–3	New Jersey		Vaněček	16,514	16–13–2	34
32	December 23	Detroit	2–3	New Jersey		Vaněček	16,514	17–13–2	36
33	December 27	Columbus	3–4	New Jersey	OT	Vaněček	16,514	18–13–2	38
34	December 29	New Jersey	6–2	Ottawa		Daws	20,022	19–13–2	40
35	December 30	New Jersey	2–5	Boston		Vaněček	17,850	19–14–2	40

January: 5–6–1 (home: 2–3–0; road: 3–3–1)
#	Date	Visitor	Score	Home	OT	Decision	Attendance	Record	Pts	Recap
36	January 3	New Jersey	6–3	Washington		Daws	17,156	20–14–2	42
37	January 5	Chicago	2–4	New Jersey		Vanecek	16,514	21–14–2	44
38	January 6	Vancouver	6–4	New Jersey		Daws	16,157	21–15–2	44
39	January 11	New Jersey	3–4	Tampa Bay	OT	Vaněček	19,092	21–15–3	45
40	January 13	New Jersey	4–1	Florida		Daws	19,526	22–15–3	47
41	January 15	New Jersey	0–3	Boston		Daws	17,850	22–16–3	47
42	January 17	Montreal	3–2	New Jersey		Daws	16,022	22–17–3	47
43	January 19	New Jersey	4–1	Columbus		Vaněček	18,630	23–17–3	49
44	January 20	Dallas	6–2	New Jersey		Daws	16,514	23–18–3	49
45	January 22	Vegas	5–6	New Jersey	OT	Vaněček	16,514	24–18–3	51
46	January 25	New Jersey	2–3	Carolina		Daws	18,792	24–19–3	51
47	January 27	New Jersey	3–6	Tampa Bay		Vaněček	19,092	24–20–3	51

February: 6–5–1 (home: 4–4–0; road: 2–1–1)
#	Date	Visitor	Score	Home	OT	Decision	Attendance	Record	Pts	Recap
48	February 6	Colorado	3–5	New Jersey		Vanecek	16,326	25–20–3	53
49	February 8	Calgary	5–3	New Jersey		Vaněček	16,374	25–21–3	53
50	February 10	New Jersey	0–1	Carolina	OT	Vaněček	18,997	25–21–4	54
51	February 12	Seattle	1–3	New Jersey		Daws	14,511	26–21–4	56
52	February 13	New Jersey	4–2	Nashville		Daws	17,159	27–21–4	58
53	February 15	Los Angeles	2–1	New Jersey		Daws	16,105	27–22–4	58
54	February 17	Philadelphia	3–6	New Jersey		Daws	70,328 (outdoors)	28–22–4	60
55	February 20	New Jersey	2–6	Washington		Daws	17,232	28–23–4	60
56	February 22	NY Rangers	5–1	New Jersey		Daws	16,650	28–24–4	60
57	February 24	Montreal	3–4	New Jersey		Daws	16,514	29–24–4	62
58	February 25	Tampa Bay	4–1	New Jersey		Schmid	16,514	29–25–4	62
59	February 27	New Jersey	7–2	San Jose		Daws	10,982	30–25–4	64

March: 6–9–0 (home: 3–3–0; road: 3–6–0)
#	Date	Visitor	Score	Home	OT	Decision	Attendance	Record	Pts	Recap
60	March 1	New Jersey	3–4	Anaheim		Daws	16,078	30–26–4	64
61	March 3	New Jersey	1–5	Los Angeles		Daws	18,145	30–27–4	64
62	March 5	Florida	5–3	New Jersey		Schmid	16,042	30–28–4	64
63	March 7	St. Louis	1–4	New Jersey		Daws	16,259	31–28–4	66
64	March 9	Carolina	4–2	New Jersey		Daws	16,514	31–29–4	66
65	March 11	New Jersey	1–3	NY Rangers		Kähkönen	18,006	31–30–4	66
66	March 14	New Jersey	6–2	Dallas		Allen	18,532	32–30–4	68
67	March 16	New Jersey	1–4	Arizona		Kähkönen	4,600	32–31–4	68
68	March 17	New Jersey	1–3	Vegas		Allen	18,234	32–32–4	68
69	March 19	Pittsburgh	2–5	New Jersey		Allen	15,605	33–32–4	70
70	March 21	Winnipeg	1–4	New Jersey		Allen	15,570	34–32–4	72
71	March 23	Ottawa	5–2	New Jersey		Allen	16,514	34–33–4	72
72	March 24	New Jersey	4–0	NY Islanders		Kähkönen	17,255	35–33–4	74
73	March 26	New Jersey	6–3	Toronto		Allen	18,360	36–33–4	76
74	March 29	New Jersey	2–5	Buffalo		Allen	15,721	36–34–4	76

April: 2–5–1 (home: 0–3–1; road: 2–2–0)
#	Date	Visitor	Score	Home	OT	Decision	Attendance	Record	Pts	Recap
75	April 2	Pittsburgh	6–3	New Jersey		Allen	16,514	36–35–4	76
76	April 3	New Jersey	3–4	NY Rangers		Kahkonen	18,006	36–36–4	76
77	April 6	New Jersey	4–3	Ottawa		Allen	19,146	37–36–4	78
78	April 7	Nashville	3–2	New Jersey	SO	Allen	15,409	37–36–5	79
79	April 9	Toronto	5–2	New Jersey		Allen	16,018	37–37–5	79
80	April 11	New Jersey	6–5	Toronto		Allen	18,618	38–37–5	81
81	April 13	New Jersey	0–1	Philadelphia		Kähkönen	19,649	38–38–5	81
82	April 15	NY Islanders	4–1	New Jersey		Allen	16,514	38–39–5	81

Legend: Win (2 points) Loss (0 points) Overtime/shootout loss (1 point)

== Player statistics ==
As of April 15, 2024

=== Skaters ===
Regular season
Player	GP	G	A	Pts	+/−	PIM
Jesper Bratt	82	27	56	83	–6	12
Jack Hughes	62	27	47	74	–12	12
Nico Hischier	71	27	40	67	–5	12
Timo Meier	69	28	24	52	–28	45
Luke Hughes	82	9	38	47	–25	28
Tyler Toffoli^{‡}	61	26	18	44	–15	12
Erik Haula	76	16	19	35	–1	54
Dawson Mercer	82	20	13	33	–26	29
Ondřej Palát	71	11	20	31	–9	37
Alexander Holtz	82	16	12	28	–15	14
Curtis Lazar	71	7	18	25	+10	44
John Marino	75	4	21	25	–6	41
Michael McLeod	45	10	9	19	+6	10
Šimon Nemec	60	3	16	19	–7	33
Dougie Hamilton	20	5	11	16	–8	20
Brendan Smith	63	5	10	15	–3	61
Nathan Bastian	54	5	7	12	–10	32
Chris Tierney	52	4	8	12	+3	21
Kevin Bahl	82	1	10	11	+1	82
Jonas Siegenthaler	57	1	8	9	–7	20
Colin Miller^{‡}	41	4	4	8	+10	24
Tomáš Nosek	36	2	4	6	–11	6
Max Willman	18	3	1	4	+1	2
Nick DeSimone^{†}	11	1	1	2	+7	2
Santeri Hatakka	12	0	2	2	+5	4
Nolan Foote	4	1	0	1	–1	0
Justin Dowling	2	1	0	1	–2	0
Cal Foote	4	0	1	1	+3	16
Kurtis MacDermid^{†}	16	0	1	1	+1	50
Brian Halonen	2	0	0	0	0	0
Graeme Clarke	3	0	0	0	–2	2
Shane Bowers	8	0	0	0	+1	0
Samuel Laberge	2	0	0	0	0	0

=== Goaltenders ===
Regular season
Player	GP	GS	TOI	W	L	OT	GA	GAA	SA	SV%	SO	G	A	PIM
Vítek Vaněček^{‡}	32	29	1,791:49	17	9	3	95	3.18	862	.890	0	0	1	0
Nico Daws	21	20	1,144:03	9	11	0	60	3.15	568	.894	0	0	1	0
Jake Allen^{†}	13	12	770:33	6	6	1	40	3.11	401	.900	0	0	0	0
Akira Schmid	19	15	914:09	5	9	1	48	3.15	457	.895	0	0	2	2
Kaapo Kähkönen^{†}	6	6	262:47	1	4	0	11	2.51	143	.923	1	0	0	0

- ^{†} Denotes player spent time with another team before joining the Devils. Stats reflect time with the Devils only.
- ^{‡} Denotes player was traded mid-season. Stats reflect time with the Devils only.
- Bold/italics denotes franchise record.

== Transactions ==
The Devils have been involved in the following transactions during the 2023–24 season.

=== Trades ===
Date	Details		Ref
June 29, 2023	To Nashville Predators 7th-round pick in 2023	To New Jersey Devils 7th-round pick in 2024	
July 1, 2023	To Dallas Stars 5th-round pick in 2025	To New Jersey Devils Colin Miller	
November 26, 2023	To New York Islanders Tyce Thompson	To New Jersey Devils Arnaud Durandeau	
February 28, 2024	To Calgary Flames Cole Brady	To New Jersey Devils Christopher Tanev	
February 28, 2024	To Dallas Stars Christopher Tanev	To New Jersey Devils 4th-round pick in 2026	
March 1, 2024	To Colorado Avalanche Zakhar Bardakov; 7th-round pick in 2024	To New Jersey Devils Kurtis MacDermid	
March 8, 2024	To Montreal Canadiens Conditional 3rd-round pick in 2025	To New Jersey Devils Jake Allen	
March 8, 2024	To San Jose Sharks Vítek Vaněček; 7th-round pick in 2025	To New Jersey Devils Kaapo Kähkönen	
March 8, 2024	To Winnipeg Jets Colin Miller	To New Jersey Devils 4th-round pick in 2026	
March 8, 2024	To Winnipeg Jets Tyler Toffoli	To New Jersey Devils 3rd-round pick in 2024; 2nd-round pick in 2025	
March 11, 2024	To Montreal Canadiens Arnaud Durandeau	To New Jersey Devils Nathan Légaré	
June 19, 2024	To Calgary Flames Kevin Bahl; 1st-round pick in 2025	To New Jersey Devils Jacob Markström	
June 21, 2024	To Minnesota Wild Graeme Clarke	To New Jersey Devils Adam Beckman	

=== Free agents ===
Date	Player	Team	Contract term	Ref
July 1, 2023	Kyle Criscuolo	from San Jose Sharks	1-year	
July 1, 2023	Justin Dowling	from Vancouver Canucks (Note: Was under contract with the Canucks, but played for their AHL affiliate during the 2022–23 season.)	2-year	
July 1, 2023	Mason Geertsen	to Vegas Golden Knights	2-year	
July 1, 2023	Ryan Graves	to Pittsburgh Penguins	6-year	
July 1, 2023	Erik Källgren	from Toronto Maple Leafs	1-year	
July 1, 2023	Miles Wood	to Colorado Avalanche	6-year	
July 4, 2023	Zachary Émond	to Laval Rocket (AHL)	1-year	
July 5, 2023	Brian Pinho	to New York Islanders	1-year	
July 12, 2023	Jesper Boqvist	to Boston Bruins	1-year	
July 14, 2023	Chris Tierney	from Montreal Canadiens	1-year	
July 19, 2023	Tomáš Nosek	from Boston Bruins	1-year	
July 30, 2023	Jérémy Groleau	to Färjestad BK (SHL)	1-year	
August 9, 2023	Cal Foote	from Nashville Predators	1-year	
September 11, 2023	Jayce Hawryluk	to HC Bílí Tygři Liberec (ELH)	1-year	
September 12, 2023	Tomáš Tatar	to Colorado Avalanche	1-year	
September 13, 2023	Keith Kinkaid	from Colorado Avalanche	1-year	
September 19, 2023	Zack Hayes	to Vaasan Sport (Liiga)	1-year	
October 7, 2023	Max Willman	from Philadelphia Flyers	1-year	
November 25, 2023	Samuel Laberge	from Utica Comets (AHL)	1-year	
February 15, 2024	Isaac Poulter	from Utica Comets (AHL)	2-year	
March 2, 2024	Mikael Diotte	from Drummondville Voltigeurs (QMJHL)	3-year	
April 4, 2024	Dylan Wendt	from Western Michigan Broncos (NCHC)	2-year	
April 30, 2024	Ryan Schmelzer	from Utica Comets (AHL)	2-year	
May 3, 2024	Erik Källgren	to Brynäs IF (SHL)	3-year	

=== Waivers ===
Date	Player	Team	Ref
January 25, 2024	Nick DeSimone	from Calgary Flames	

=== Retirement ===
Date	Player	Ref
August 21, 2023	Jonathan Bernier	

=== Signings ===
Date	Player	Contract term	Ref
June 28, 2023	Timo Meier	8-year	
June 29, 2023	Shane Bowers	1-year	
July 1, 2023	Nathan Bastian	2-year	
July 1, 2023	Michael McLeod	1-year	
July 31, 2023	Kevin Bahl	2-year	
April 30, 2024	Shane Bowers	2-year	
May 6, 2024	Seamus Casey	3-year	
May 6, 2024	Jakub Málek	2-year	
May 7, 2024	Nathan Légaré	1-year	
May 7, 2024	Max Willman	1-year	
May 16, 2024	Brian Halonen	2-year	
May 16, 2024	Samuel Laberge	1-year	
May 17, 2024	Kurtis MacDermid	3-year	
June 24, 2024	Nick DeSimone	1-year	

== Draft picks ==
Below are the New Jersey Devils' selections at the 2023 NHL entry draft, which was held on June 28 and 29, 2023, at Bridgestone Arena in Nashville, Tennessee.

Round	#	Player	Pos	Nationality	College/junior/club team
2	58	Lenni Hämeenaho	RW	Finland	Porin Ässät (Liiga)
4	122	Cam Squires	RW	Canada	Cape Breton Eagles (QMJHL)
5	154	Chase Cheslock	D	United States	Omaha Lancers (USHL)
6	164^{1}	Cole Brown	LW	Canada	Hamilton Bulldogs (OHL)
6	186	Danil Karpovich	D	Belarus	JHC Avto (MHL)

1. The San Jose Sharks' third-round pick went to the New Jersey Devils as the result of a trade on June 27, 2023, that sent Mackenzie Blackwood to San Jose in exchange for this pick.
