= 2023–24 Philadelphia Flyers season =

National Hockey League season

2023–24 Philadelphia Flyers
- Division: 6th Metropolitan
- Conference: 11th Eastern
- 2023–24 record: 38–33–11
- Home record: 20–17–4
- Road record: 18–16–7
- Goals for: 235
- Goals against: 261

Team information
- General manager: Daniel Briere
- Coach: John Tortorella
- Captain: Vacant (Oct.–Feb.); Sean Couturier (Feb.–Apr.)
- Alternate captains: Travis Konecny (Feb.–Apr.); Scott Laughton; Vacant (Oct.–Feb.)
- Arena: Wells Fargo Center
- Average attendance: 18,414
- Minor league affiliates: Lehigh Valley Phantoms (AHL); Reading Royals (ECHL)

Team leaders
- Goals: Travis Konecny (33)
- Assists: Travis Konecny (35)
- Points: Travis Konecny (68)
- Penalty minutes: Garnet Hathaway (132)
- Plus/minus: Nick Seeler; Sean Walker (+9)
- Wins: Samuel Ersson (23)
- Goals against average: Carter Hart (2.80)

The 2023–24 Philadelphia Flyers season was the 57th season for the National Hockey League (NHL) franchise that was established on June 5, 1967.

On April 16, 2024, the Flyers were eliminated from playoff contention following a 2–1 loss to the Washington Capitals. The Flyers suffered a late season collapse, as the team had 36-26-9 on March 23, only to fail to get a win in their next 8 games.

== Regular season ==
On February 14, Sean Couturier was named the 20th captain in franchise history, ending a nearly two-year stretch the Flyers had opted not to name a replacement for Claude Giroux. Travis Konecny was named an alternate captain along with Scott Laughton, who had been the lone Flyer to wear a letter under head coach John Tortorella.

=== Standings ===
==== Divisional standings ====
Metropolitan Division
Pos	Team	GP	W	L	OTL	RW	GF	GA	GD	Pts
1	p – New York Rangers	82	55	23	4	43	282	229	+53	114
2	x – Carolina Hurricanes	82	52	23	7	44	279	216	+63	111
3	x – New York Islanders	82	39	27	16	29	246	263	−17	94
4	x – Washington Capitals	82	40	31	11	32	220	257	−37	91
5	Pittsburgh Penguins	82	38	32	12	32	255	251	+4	88
6	Philadelphia Flyers	82	38	33	11	30	235	261	−26	87
7	New Jersey Devils	82	38	39	5	33	264	283	−19	81
8	Columbus Blue Jackets	82	27	43	12	21	237	300	−63	66

Source: National Hockey League
Rules for classification: 1) Fewer number of games played (GP, only during regular season); 2) Greater number of regulation wins (RW); 3) Greater number of wins in regulation and overtime, excluding shootout wins (ROW); 4) Greater number of total wins, including shootouts (W); 5) Greater number of points earned in head-to-head play; if teams played an uneven number of head-to-head games, the result of the first game on the home ice of the team with the extra home game is discarded; 6) Greater goal differential (GD); 7) Greater number of goals scored (GF)
p – Clinched Presidents' Trophy; x – Clinched playoff spot

==== Conference standings ====
Eastern Conference Wild Card
Pos	Div	Team	GP	W	L	OTL	RW	GF	GA	GD	Pts
1	AT	x – Tampa Bay Lightning	82	45	29	8	37	291	268	+23	98
2	ME	x – Washington Capitals	82	40	31	11	32	220	257	−37	91
3	AT	Detroit Red Wings	82	41	32	9	27	278	274	+4	91
4	ME	Pittsburgh Penguins	82	38	32	12	32	255	251	+4	88
5	ME	Philadelphia Flyers	82	38	33	11	30	235	261	−26	87
6	AT	Buffalo Sabres	82	39	37	6	33	246	244	+2	84
7	ME	New Jersey Devils	82	38	39	5	33	264	283	−19	81
8	AT	Ottawa Senators	82	37	41	4	25	255	281	−26	78
9	AT	Montreal Canadiens	82	30	36	16	20	236	289	−53	76
10	ME	Columbus Blue Jackets	82	27	43	12	21	237	300	−63	66

Source: National Hockey League
Rules for classification: 1) Fewer number of games played (GP, only during regular season); 2) Greater number of regulation wins (RW); 3) Greater number of wins in regulation and overtime, excluding shootout wins (ROW); 4) Greater number of total wins, including shootouts (W); 5) Greater number of points earned in head-to-head play; if teams played an uneven number of head-to-head games, the result of the first game on the home ice of the team with the extra home game is discarded; 6) Greater goal differential (GD); 7) Greater number of goals scored (GF)
x – Clinched playoff spot

== Schedule and results ==
=== Pre-season ===
The pre-season schedule was published on June 21, 2023.

2023 pre-season game log: 3–2–1 (home: 2–0–1; road: 1–2–0)

Game	Date	Opponent	Score	OT	Decision	Location	Attendance	Record	Recap
1	September 25	@ New Jersey	0–6		Petersen	Prudential Center	8,532	0–1–0	
2	September 27	@ NY Islanders	1–2		Ersson	UBS Arena	9,106	0–2–0	
3	September 29	@ Boston	4–3	SO	Petersen	TD Garden	17,765	1–2–0	
4	September 30	New Jersey	2–3	OT	Hart	Wells Fargo Center	12,855	1–2–1	
5	October 2	Boston	3–1		Ersson	Wells Fargo Center	11,511	2–2–1	
6	October 5	NY Islanders	5–2		Hart	Wells Fargo Center	11,289	3–2–1	

=== Regular season ===
2023–24 game log
October: 4–4–1 (home: 3–2–0; road: 1–2–1)

Game	Date	Opponent	Score	OT	Decision	Location	Attendance	Record	Points	Recap
1	October 12	@ Columbus	4–2		Hart	Nationwide Arena	18,614	1–0–0	2	
2	October 14	@ Ottawa	2–5		Hart	Canadian Tire Centre	20,011	1–1–0	2	
3	October 17	Vancouver	2–0		Hart	Wells Fargo Center	18,883	2–1–0	4	
4	October 19	Edmonton	4–1		Hart	Wells Fargo Center	17,590	3–1–0	6	
5	October 21	@ Dallas	4–5	OT	Ersson	American Airlines Center	18,532	3–1–1	7	
6	October 24	@ Vegas	2–3		Hart	T-Mobile Arena	17,717	3–2–1	7	
7	October 26	Minnesota	6–2		Hart	Wells Fargo Center	17,144	4–2–1	9	
8	October 28	Anaheim	4–7		Ersson	Wells Fargo Center	18,275	4–3–1	9	
9	October 30	Carolina	2–3		Hart	Wells Fargo Center	15,569	4–4–1	9	

November: 7–6–1 (home: 2–4–1; road: 5–2–0)

Game	Date	Opponent	Score	OT	Decision	Location	Attendance	Record	Points	Recap
10	November 1	Buffalo	2–5		Ersson	Wells Fargo Center	17,279	4–5–1	9	
11	November 3	@ Buffalo	5–1		Ersson	KeyBank Center	16,612	5–5–1	11	
12	November 4	Los Angeles	0–5		Petersen	Wells Fargo Center	18,304	5–6–1	11	
13	November 7	@ San Jose	1–2		Ersson	SAP Center	10,074	5–7–1	11	
14	November 10	@ Anaheim	6–3		Ersson	Honda Center	15,550	6–7–1	13	
15	November 11	@ Los Angeles	4–2		Petersen	Crypto.com Arena	18,145	7–7–1	15	
16	November 15	@ Carolina	3–1		Hart	PNC Arena	18,700	8–7–1	17	
17	November 18	Vegas	4–3	OT	Hart	Wells Fargo Center	18,113	9–7–1	19	
18	November 19	Columbus	5–2		Ersson	Wells Fargo Center	17,416	10–7–1	21	
19	November 22	@ NY Islanders	2–3		Hart	UBS Arena	17,255	10–8–1	21	
20	November 24	NY Rangers	1–3		Hart	Wells Fargo Center	19,032	10–9–1	21	
21	November 25	@ NY Islanders	1–0	SO	Ersson	UBS Arena	17,255	11–9–1	23	
22	November 28	Carolina	1–4		Hart	Wells Fargo Center	17,885	11–10–1	23	
23	November 30	New Jersey	3–4	OT	Hart	Wells Fargo Center	17,748	11–10–2	24	

December: 8–2–3 (home: 3–1–0; road: 5–1–3)

Game	Date	Opponent	Score	OT	Decision	Location	Attendance	Record	Points	Recap
24	December 2	@ Pittsburgh	4–3	SO	Ersson	PPG Paints Arena	18,303	12–10–2	26	
25	December 4	Pittsburgh	2–1	OT	Hart	Wells Fargo Center	18,084	13–10–2	28	
26	December 7	@ Arizona	4–1		Hart	Mullett Arena	4,600	14–10–2	30	
27	December 9	@ Colorado	5–2		Hart	Ball Arena	18,119	15–10–2	32	
28	December 12	@ Nashville	2–3	OT	Ersson	Bridgestone Arena	17,159	15–10–3	33	
29	December 14	Washington	4–3	SO	Ersson	Wells Fargo Center	18,557	16–10–3	35	
30	December 16	Detroit	1–0		Ersson	Wells Fargo Center	18,341	17–10–3	37	
31	December 19	@ New Jersey	3–2	OT	Ersson	Prudential Center	16,514	18–10–3	39	
32	December 21	Nashville	2–4		Ersson	Wells Fargo Center	19,313	18–11–3	39	
33	December 22	@ Detroit	6–7	SO	Hart	Little Caesars Arena	19,515	18–11–4	40	
34	December 28	@ Vancouver	4–1		Ersson	Rogers Arena	18,986	19–11–4	42	
35	December 29	@ Seattle	1–2	OT	Hart	Climate Pledge Arena	17,151	19–11–5	43	
36	December 31	@ Calgary	3–4		Ersson	Scotiabank Saddledome	18,723	19–12–5	43	

January: 6–7–1 (home: 3–5–1; road: 3–2–0)

Game	Date	Opponent	Score	OT	Decision	Location	Attendance	Record	Points	Recap
37	January 2	@ Edmonton	2–5		Hart	Rogers Place	18,347	19–13–5	43	
38	January 4	Columbus	2–3	SO	Ersson	Wells Fargo Center	17,510	19–13–6	44	
39	January 6	Calgary	3–2		Hart	Wells Fargo Center	19,715	20–13–6	46	
40	January 8	Pittsburgh	1–4		Hart	Wells Fargo Center	18,625	20–14–6	46	
41	January 10	Montreal	3–2	SO	Ersson	Wells Fargo Center	18,238	21–14–6	48	
42	January 12	@ Minnesota	4–3	OT	Hart	Xcel Energy Center	18,473	22–14–6	50	
43	January 13	@ Winnipeg	2–0		Ersson	Canada Life Centre	14,540	23–14–6	52	
44	January 15	@ St. Louis	4–2		Hart	Enterprise Center	18,096	24–14–6	54	
45	January 18	Dallas	5–1		Ersson	Wells Fargo Center	18,024	25–14–6	56	
46	January 20	Colorado	4–7		Hart	Wells Fargo Center	19,078	25–15–6	56	
47	January 21	Ottawa	3–5		Ersson	Wells Fargo Center	18,930	25–16–6	56	
48	January 23	Tampa Bay	3–6		Ersson	Wells Fargo Center	17,937	25–17–6	56	
49	January 25	@ Detroit	0–3		Ersson	Little Caesars Arena	19,515	25–18–6	56	
50	January 27	Boston	2–6		Ersson	Wells Fargo Center	19,276	25–19–6	56	

February: 6–3–1 (home: 4–1–0; road: 2–2–1)

Game	Date	Opponent	Score	OT	Decision	Location	Attendance	Record	Points	Recap
51	February 6	@ Florida	2–1		Ersson	Amerant Bank Arena	17,340	26–19–6	58	
52	February 8	Winnipeg	4–1		Ersson	Wells Fargo Center	18,049	27–19–6	60	
53	February 10	Seattle	3–2		Petersen	Wells Fargo Center	18,926	28–19–6	62	
54	February 12	Arizona	5–3		Ersson	Wells Fargo Center	18,094	29–19–6	64	
55	February 15	@ Toronto	3–4	OT	Ersson	Scotiabank Arena	18,646	29–19–7	65	
56	February 17	@ New Jersey	3–6		Ersson	MetLife Stadium	70,328 (outdoors)	29–20–7	65	
57	February 21	@ Chicago	3–1		Ersson	United Center	18,245	30–20–7	67	
58	February 24	NY Rangers	1–2		Ersson	Wells Fargo Center	19,756	30–21–7	67	
59	February 25	@ Pittsburgh	6–7		Petersen	PPG Paints Arena	18,212	30–22–7	67	
60	February 27	Tampa Bay	6–2		Ersson	Wells Fargo Center	18,647	31–22–7	69	

March: 5–7–3 (home: 4–3–1; road: 1–4–2)

Game	Date	Opponent	Score	OT	Decision	Location	Attendance	Record	Points	Recap
61	March 1	@ Washington	2–5		Ersson	Capital One Arena	18,573	31–23–7	69	
62	March 2	Ottawa	4–2		Sandstrom	Wells Fargo Center	18,971	32–23–7	71	
63	March 4	St. Louis	1–2	SO	Ersson	Wells Fargo Center	18,728	32–23–8	72	
64	March 7	@ Florida	2–1		Ersson	Amerant Bank Arena	18,817	33–23–8	74	
65	March 9	@ Tampa Bay	0–7		Ersson	Amalie Arena	19,092	33–24–8	74	
66	March 12	San Jose	3–2		Ersson	Wells Fargo Center	18,289	34–24–8	76	
67	March 14	Toronto	2–6		Ersson	Wells Fargo Center	19,158	34–25–8	76	
68	March 16	@ Boston	5–6		Sandstrom	TD Garden	17,850	34–26–8	76	
69	March 19	Toronto	4–3		Ersson	Wells Fargo Center	18,623	35–26–8	78	
70	March 21	@ Carolina	2–3	OT	Ersson	PNC Arena	18,700	35–26–9	79	
71	March 23	Boston	3–2		Ersson	Wells Fargo Center	18,623	36–26–9	81	
72	March 24	Florida	1–4		Sandstrom	Wells Fargo Center	18,712	36–27–9	81	
73	March 26	@ NY Rangers	5–6	OT	Ersson	Madison Square Garden	18,006	36–27–10	82	
74	March 28	@ Montreal	1–4		Ersson	Bell Centre	21,105	36–28–10	82	
75	March 30	Chicago	1–5		Ersson	Wells Fargo Center	19,250	36–29–10	82	

April: 2–4–1 (home: 1–1–1; road: 1–3–0)

Game	Date	Opponent	Score	OT	Decision	Location	Attendance	Record	Points	Recap
76	April 1	NY Islanders	3–4	OT	Fedotov	Wells Fargo Center	18,556	36–29–11	83	
77	April 5	@ Buffalo	2–4		Fedotov	KeyBank Center	15,783	36–30–11	83	
78	April 6	@ Columbus	2–6		Ersson	Nationwide Arena	18,323	36–31–11	83	
79	April 9	@ Montreal	3–9		Ersson	Bell Centre	21,105	36–32–11	83	
80	April 11	@ NY Rangers	4–1		Ersson	Madison Square Garden	18,006	37–32–11	85	
81	April 13	New Jersey	1–0		Ersson	Wells Fargo Center	19,649	38–32–11	87	
82	April 16	Washington	1–2		Ersson	Wells Fargo Center	19,411	38–33–11	87	

Legend: = Win = Loss = OT/SO Loss

== Player statistics ==
=== Skaters ===
Regular season
Player	GP	G	A	Pts	+/−	PIM
Travis Konecny	76	33	35	68	+4	67
Owen Tippett	78	28	25	53	−5	12
Joel Farabee	82	22	28	50	−13	37
Travis Sanheim	81	10	34	44	−20	48
Morgan Frost	71	13	28	41	+4	22
Scott Laughton	82	13	26	39	−9	69
Sean Couturier	74	11	27	38	−10	29
Tyson Foerster	77	20	13	33	0	32
Cam York	82	10	20	30	−13	44
Cam Atkinson	70	13	15	28	−22	27
Ryan Poehling	77	11	17	28	−11	6
Bobby Brink	57	11	12	23	+1	10
Sean Walker^{‡}	63	6	16	22	+9	34
Egor Zamula	66	5	16	21	+3	32
Noah Cates	59	6	12	18	−8	0
Garnet Hathaway	82	7	10	17	−7	132
Nick Seeler	71	1	12	13	+9	78
Jamie Drysdale^{†}	24	2	3	5	−18	4
Olle Lycksell	18	1	4	5	0	6
Marc Staal	35	1	4	5	+2	14
Louie Belpedio	12	2	2	4	+6	0
Rasmus Ristolainen	31	1	3	4	−6	8
Nicolas Deslauriers	60	1	3	4	−7	89
Erik Johnson^{†}	17	2	1	3	−9	2
Ronnie Attard	12	0	2	2	+1	6
Adam Ginning	9	1	0	1	0	0
Rhett Gardner	1	0	0	0	0	0
Victor Mete	1	0	0	0	0	0
Emil Andrae	4	0	0	0	–1	0
Denis Gurianov^{†}	4	0	0	0	0	0

=== Goaltenders ===
Regular season
Player	GP	GS	TOI	W	L	OT	GA	GAA	SA	SV%	SO	G	A	PIM
Samuel Ersson	51	49	2,809:28	23	19	7	132	2.82	1,204	.890	4	0	0	4
Carter Hart	26	25	1,455:11	12	9	3	68	2.80	727	.906	1	0	1	0
Cal Petersen	5	4	276:55	2	2	0	18	3.90	132	.864	0	0	0	0
Felix Sandstrom	5	3	263:29	1	2	0	17	3.87	96	.823	0	0	0	0
Ivan Fedotov	3	1	121:09	0	1	1	10	4.95	53	.811	0	0	0	0

^{†}Denotes player spent time with another team before joining the Flyers. Stats reflect time with the Flyers only.
^{‡}Denotes player was traded mid-season. Stats reflect time with the Flyers only.
Bold/italics denotes franchise record.

== Awards and records ==
=== Awards ===
Type	Award/honor	Recipient	Ref
League (in-season)	NHL All-Star Game selection	Travis Konecny	
Team	Barry Ashbee Trophy	Travis Sanheim	
Team	Bobby Clarke Trophy	Travis Konecny	
Team	Flyers Alumni Community Leadership Award	Scott Laughton	
Team	Gene Hart Memorial Award	Samuel Ersson	
Team	Pelle Lindbergh Memorial Trophy	Cam York	
Team	Toyota Cup	Travis Konecny	
Team	Yanick Dupre Memorial Class Guy Award	Nick Seeler	

=== Milestones ===
Milestone	Player	Date	Ref
First game	Emil Andrae	October 14, 2023	
First game	Ivan Fedotov	April 1, 2024	

== Transactions ==
The Flyers were involved in the following transactions during the 2023–24 season.

Key:

† Contract is entry-level.
‡ Contract initially takes effect in the 2024–25 season.

=== Trades ===
Date	Details		Ref
June 29, 2023	To Chicago Blackhawks 6th-round pick in 2023; LAK 2nd-round pick in 2024	To Philadelphia Flyers TBL 2nd-round pick in 2023	
August 9, 2023	To Carolina Hurricanes David Kase	To Philadelphia Flyers Massimo Rizzo; 5th-round pick in 2025	
January 8, 2024	To Anaheim Ducks Rights to Cutter Gauthier	To Philadelphia Flyers Jamie Drysdale; 2nd-round pick in 2025	
March 6, 2024	To Colorado Avalanche Sean Walker; 5th-round pick in 2026	To Philadelphia Flyers Ryan Johansen; 1st-round pick in 2025	
March 7, 2024	To Calgary Flames Rights to Mikhail Vorobyev	To Philadelphia Flyers Noah Hanifin	
March 7, 2024	To Vegas Golden Knights Noah Hanifin	To Philadelphia Flyers 5th-round pick in 2024	
March 8, 2024	To Buffalo Sabres 4th-round pick in 2024	To Philadelphia Flyers Erik Johnson	
March 8, 2024	To Nashville Predators Wade Allison	To Philadelphia Flyers Denis Gurianov	

=== Players acquired ===
Date	Player	Former team	Term	Via	Ref
July 1, 2023	Rhett Gardner	Dallas Stars	2-year	Free agency	
July 1, 2023	Garnet Hathaway	Boston Bruins	2-year	Free agency	
July 1, 2023	Ryan Poehling	Pittsburgh Penguins	1-year	Free agency	
July 3, 2023	Marc Staal	Florida Panthers	1-year	Free agency	
July 5, 2023	Victor Mete	Toronto Maple Leafs	1-year	Free agency	
April 8, 2024	Oscar Eklind	Lulea HF (SHL)	1-year	Free-agency†‡	
June 15, 2024	Rodrigo Abols	Rogle BK (SHL)	1-year	Free-agency‡	

=== Players lost ===
Date	Player	New team	Term	Via	Ref
July 1, 2023	Troy Grosenick	Nashville Predators	1-year	Free agency	
July 1, 2023	James van Riemsdyk	Boston Bruins	1-year	Free agency	
July 11, 2023	Brendan Lemieux	Carolina Hurricanes	1-year	Free agency	
July 15, 2023	Tony DeAngelo			Buyout	
July 24, 2023	Tony DeAngelo	Carolina Hurricanes	1-year	Free agency	
August 1, 2023	Wyatte Wylie	Ontario Reign (AHL)	1-year	Free agency	
October 7, 2023	Max Willman	New Jersey Devils	1-year	Free agency	
October 12, 2023	Jackson Cates	Bridgeport Islanders (AHL)	PTO	Free agency	
October 30, 2023	Kieffer Bellows	Toronto Marlies (AHL)	PTO	Free agency	

=== Signings ===
Date	Player	Term	Ref
July 5, 2023	Ronnie Attard	2-year	
July 9, 2023	Aleksei Kolosov	3-year†	
July 10, 2023	Noah Cates	2-year	
July 10, 2023	Cam York	2-year	
July 13, 2023	Olle Lycksell	2-year	
July 25, 2023	Alexis Gendron	3-year†	
August 5, 2023	Samuel Ersson	2-year	
August 21, 2023	Oliver Bonk	3-year†	
September 7, 2023	Morgan Frost	2-year	
September 26, 2023	Carson Bjarnason	3-year†	
January 26, 2024	Owen Tippett	8-year‡	
January 27, 2024	Ryan Poehling	2-year‡	
March 3, 2024	Denver Barkey	3-year†‡	
March 6, 2024	Nick Seeler	4-year‡	
April 15, 2024	Hunter McDonald	2-year†‡	
April 17, 2024	Massimo Rizzo	2-year†‡	
April 23, 2024	Ivan Fedotov	2-year‡	
June 17, 2024	Adam Ginning	2-year‡	

== Draft picks ==
Below are the Philadelphia Flyers' selections at the 2023 NHL entry draft, which was held on June 28 and 29, 2023, in Nashville, Tennessee.

Round	#	Player	Pos	Nationality	Team (league)
1	7	Matvei Michkov	RW	Russia	SKA Saint Petersburg (KHL)
1	22	Oliver Bonk	D	Canada	London Knights (OHL)
2	51	Carson Bjarnason	G	Canada	Brandon Wheat Kings (WHL)
3	87	Yegor Zavragin	G	Russia	Mamonty Yugry (MHL)
3	95	Denver Barkey	C	Canada	London Knights (OHL)
4	103	Cole Knuble	C	United States	Fargo Force (USHL)
4	120	Alex Ciernik	LW	Slovakia	Södertälje SK (HockeyAllsvenskan)
5	135	Carter Sotheran	D	Canada	Portland Winterhawks (WHL)
6	172	Ryan MacPherson	C	Canada	Leamington Flyers (GOJHL)
7	199	Matteo Mann	D	Canada	Chicoutimi Saguenéens (QMJHL)
