= 2023–24 Chicago Blackhawks season =

National Hockey League season

2023–24 Chicago Blackhawks
- Division: 8th Central
- Conference: 15th Western
- 2023–24 record: 23–53–6
- Home record: 16–21–4
- Road record: 7–32–2
- Goals for: 179
- Goals against: 290

Team information
- General manager: Kyle Davidson
- Coach: Luke Richardson
- Captain: Vacant
- Alternate captains: Nick Foligno; Seth Jones; Connor Murphy; Corey Perry (Oct. 10 – Nov. 28)
- Arena: United Center
- Average attendance: 18,836
- Minor league affiliates: Rockford IceHogs (AHL); Indy Fuel (ECHL)

Team leaders
- Goals: Connor Bedard; Jason Dickinson (22)
- Assists: Connor Bedard (39)
- Points: Connor Bedard (61)
- Penalty minutes: Jarred Tinordi (64)
- Plus/minus: Joey Anderson (+5)
- Wins: Petr Mrazek (18)
- Goals against average: Petr Mrazek (3.05)

The 2023–24 Chicago Blackhawks season was the 98th season (97th season of play) for the National Hockey League (NHL) franchise that was established on September 25, 1926. The Blackhawks were led by second-year head coach Luke Richardson. This was the first season since 2006–07 that Jonathan Toews was not on the roster as his contract expired at the end of the previous season. In addition, it was the first full-season since that same year without Patrick Kane after he was traded to the New York Rangers in February 2023.

On March 9, 2024, the Blackhawks became the first team to be eliminated from playoff contention following a 4–1 loss to the Washington Capitals and a 5–3 win by the Vegas Golden Knights against the Detroit Red Wings. Two days later, Connor Bedard scored his 20th goal of the season, making him as the first Blackhawks player to hit the 20-goal mark at 18 years old since Eddie Olczyk did it in the 1984–85 season.

== Standings ==
=== Divisional standings ===
Central Division
Pos	Team	GP	W	L	OTL	RW	GF	GA	GD	Pts
1	z – Dallas Stars	82	52	21	9	40	298	234	+64	113
2	x – Winnipeg Jets	82	52	24	6	46	259	199	+60	110
3	x – Colorado Avalanche	82	50	25	7	42	304	254	+50	107
4	x – Nashville Predators	82	47	30	5	38	269	248	+21	99
5	St. Louis Blues	82	43	33	6	31	239	250	−11	92
6	Minnesota Wild	82	39	34	9	32	251	263	−12	87
7	Arizona Coyotes	82	36	41	5	28	256	274	−18	77
8	Chicago Blackhawks	82	23	53	6	17	179	290	−111	52

Source: National Hockey League
Rules for classification: 1) Fewer number of games played (GP, only during regular season); 2) Greater number of regulation wins (RW); 3) Greater number of wins in regulation and overtime, excluding shootout wins (ROW); 4) Greater number of total wins, including shootouts (W); 5) Greater number of points earned in head-to-head play; if teams played an uneven number of head-to-head games, the result of the first game on the home ice of the team with the extra home game is discarded; 6) Greater goal differential (GD); 7) Greater number of goals scored (GF)
x – Clinched playoff spot; z – Clinched conference

=== Conference standings ===
Western Conference Wild Card
Pos	Div	Team	GP	W	L	OTL	RW	GF	GA	GD	Pts
1	CE	x – Nashville Predators	82	47	30	5	38	269	248	+21	99
2	PA	x – Vegas Golden Knights	82	45	29	8	34	267	245	+22	98
3	CE	St. Louis Blues	82	43	33	6	31	239	250	−11	92
4	CE	Minnesota Wild	82	39	34	9	32	251	263	−12	87
5	PA	Calgary Flames	82	38	39	5	32	253	271	−18	81
6	PA	Seattle Kraken	82	34	35	13	28	217	236	−19	81
7	CE	Arizona Coyotes	82	36	41	5	28	256	274	−18	77
8	PA	Anaheim Ducks	82	27	50	5	21	204	295	−91	59
9	CE	Chicago Blackhawks	82	23	53	6	17	179	290	−111	52
10	PA	San Jose Sharks	82	19	54	9	14	181	331	−150	47

Source: National Hockey League
Rules for classification: 1) Fewer number of games played (GP, only during regular season); 2) Greater number of regulation wins (RW); 3) Greater number of wins in regulation and overtime, excluding shootout wins (ROW); 4) Greater number of total wins, including shootouts (W); 5) Greater number of points earned in head-to-head play; if teams played an uneven number of head-to-head games, the result of the first game on the home ice of the team with the extra home game is discarded; 6) Greater goal differential (GD); 7) Greater number of goals scored (GF)
x – Clinched playoff spot

== Schedule and results ==
=== Preseason ===
The Chicago Blackhawks preseason schedule was released on June 27, 2023.

2023 preseason game log: 2–2–2 (Home: 2–0–1; Road: 0–2–1)

#	Date	Visitor	Score	Home	OT	Decision	Arena	Attendance	Record	Recap
1	September 28	St. Louis	1–2	Chicago	OT	Commesso	United Center	9,947	1–0–0	Recap
2	September 30	Chicago	2–3	Minnesota	OT	Soderblom	Xcel Energy Center	18,199	1–0–1	Recap
3	October 1	Chicago	1–6	Detroit		Stauber	Little Caesars Arena	13,850	1–1–1	Recap
4	October 3	Detroit	2–4	Chicago		Mrazek	United Center	12,610	2–1–1	Recap
5	October 5	Minnesota	3–2	Chicago	SO	Soderblom	United Center	12,766	2–1–2	Recap
6	October 7	Chicago	3–5	St. Louis		Mrazek	Enterprise Center	17,154	2–2–2	Recap

Legend:

Win Loss Overtime/shootout loss

=== Regular season ===
The Chicago Blackhawks regular season schedule was released on June 27, 2023.

2023–24 game log
October: 3–6–0 (Home: 0–2–0; Road: 3–4–0)

#	Date	Visitor	Score	Home	OT	Decision	Attendance	Record	Points	Recap
1	October 10	Chicago	4–2	Pittsburgh		Mrazek	18,411	1–0–0	2	
2	October 11	Chicago	1–3	Boston		Soderblom	17,565	1–1–0	2	
3	October 14	Chicago	2–3	Montreal		Mrazek	21,105	1–2–0	2	
4	October 16	Chicago	4–1	Toronto		Soderblom	19,101	2–2–0	4	
5	October 19	Chicago	0–4	Colorado		Mrazek	18,140	2–3–0	4	
6	October 21	Vegas	5–3	Chicago		Soderblom	19,867	2–4–0	4	
7	October 24	Boston	3–0	Chicago		Mrazek	19,370	2–5–0	4	
8	October 27	Chicago	4–3	Vegas	OT	Mrazek	18,338	3–5–0	6	
9	October 30	Chicago	1–8	Arizona		Soderblom	4,600	3–6–0	6	

November: 4–8–0 (Home: 3–4–0; Road: 1–4–0)

#	Date	Visitor	Score	Home	OT	Decision	Attendance	Record	Points	Recap
10	November 4	Florida	2–5	Chicago		Mrazek	18,666	4–6–0	8	
11	November 5	New Jersey	4–2	Chicago		Soderblom	18,388	4–7–0	8	
12	November 9	Chicago	5–3	Tampa Bay		Mrazek	19,092	5–7–0	10	
13	November 12	Chicago	3–4	Florida		Soderblom	19,359	5–8–0	10	
14	November 16	Tampa Bay	4–2	Chicago		Mrazek	18,691	5–9–0	10	
15	November 18	Chicago	2–4	Nashville		Soderblom	17,397	5–10–0	10	
16	November 19	Buffalo	3–2	Chicago		Mrazek	19,027	5–11–0	10	
17	November 22	Chicago	3–7	Columbus		Mrazek	18,158	5–12–0	10	
18	November 24	Toronto	3–4	Chicago	OT	Soderblom	20,238	6–12–0	12	
19	November 26	St. Louis	4–2	Chicago		Soderblom	18,223	6–13–0	12	
20	November 28	Seattle	3–4	Chicago		Mrazek	17,070	7–13–0	14	
21	November 30	Chicago	1–5	Detroit		Mrazek	19,515	7–14–0	14	

December: 4–9–2 (Home: 4–3–1; Road: 0–6–1)

#	Date	Visitor	Score	Home	OT	Decision	Attendance	Record	Points	Recap
22	December 2	Chicago	1–3	Winnipeg		Soderblom	14,189	7–15–0	14	
23	December 3	Chicago	1–4	Minnesota		Mrazek	19,301	7–16–0	14	
24	December 5	Nashville	4–3	Chicago	SO	Soderblom	16,521	7–16–1	15	
25	December 7	Anaheim	0–1	Chicago		Mrazek	17,424	8–16–1	17	
26	December 9	St. Louis	1–3	Chicago		Mrazek	18,892	9–16–1	19	
27	December 10	Washington	4–2	Chicago		Soderblom	18,258	9–17–1	19	
28	December 12	Chicago	1–4	Edmonton		Mrazek	18,347	9–18–1	19	
29	December 14	Chicago	1–7	Seattle		Soderblom	17,151	9–19–1	19	
30	December 17	Vancouver	4–3	Chicago		Mrazek	19,302	9–20–1	19	
31	December 19	Colorado	2–3	Chicago		Mrazek	19,719	10–20–1	21	
32	December 22	Montreal	5–2	Chicago		Mrazek	20,340	10–21–1	21	
33	December 23	Chicago	5–7	St. Louis		Soderblom	18,096	10–22–1	21	
34	December 27	Winnipeg	1–2	Chicago	OT	Mrazek	20,540	11–22–1	23	
35	December 29	Chicago	4–5	Dallas	OT	Mrazek	18,532	11–22–2	24	
36	December 31	Chicago	1–8	Dallas		Mrazek	18,532	11–23–2	24	

January: 3–11–0 (Home: 3–2–0; Road: 0–9–0)

#	Date	Visitor	Score	Home	OT	Decision	Attendance	Record	Points	Recap
37	January 2	Chicago	0–3	Nashville		Soderblom	17,363	11–24–2	24	
38	January 4	Chicago	1–4	NY Rangers		Mrazek	18,006	11–25–2	24	
39	January 5	Chicago	2–4	New Jersey		Soderblom	16,514	11–26–2	24	
40	January 7	Calgary	3–4	Chicago		Mrazek	19,907	12–26–2	26	
41	January 9	Edmonton	2–1	Chicago		Mrazek	19,756	12–27–2	26	
42	January 11	Chicago	1–2	Winnipeg		Mrazek	15,225	12–28–2	26	
43	January 13	Dallas	3–1	Chicago		Mrazek	18,889	12–29–2	26	
44	January 16	San Jose	1–2	Chicago	SO	Mrazek	16,401	13–29–2	28	
—	January 17	Chicago	—	Buffalo	Postponed due to travel restrictions in Buffalo; moved to January 18.					
45	January 18	Chicago	0–3	Buffalo		Soderblom	15,465	13–30–2	28	
46	January 19	NY Islanders	3–4	Chicago	OT	Mrazek	18,463	14–30–2	30	
47	January 22	Chicago	0–2	Vancouver		Mrazek	18,714	14–31–2	30	
48	January 24	Chicago	2–6	Seattle		Soderblom	17,151	14–32–2	30	
49	January 25	Chicago	0–3	Edmonton		Mrazek	18,347	14–33–2	30	
50	January 27	Chicago	0–1	Calgary		Mrazek	18,279	14–34–2	30	

February: 1–6–3 (Home: 1–5–3; Road: 0–1–0)

#	Date	Visitor	Score	Home	OT	Decision	Attendance	Record	Points	Recap
51	February 7	Minnesota	2–1	Chicago		Mrazek	17,230	14–35–2	30	
52	February 9	NY Rangers	4–3	Chicago	OT	Mrazek	19,995	14–35–3	31	
53	February 13	Vancouver	4–2	Chicago		Mrazek	16,452	14–36–3	31	
54	February 15	Pittsburgh	4–1	Chicago		Soderblom	19,423	14–37–3	31	
55	February 17	Ottawa	2–3	Chicago		Mrazek	18,888	15–37–3	33	
56	February 19	Chicago	3–6	Carolina		Mrazek	18,909	15–38–3	33	
57	February 21	Philadelphia	3–1	Chicago		Soderblom	18,245	15–39–3	33	
58	February 23	Winnipeg	3–2	Chicago	OT	Mrazek	18,891	15–39–4	34	
59	February 25	Detroit	3–2	Chicago	OT	Mrazek	21,141	15–39–5	35	
60	February 29	Colorado	5–0	Chicago		Mrazek	18,096	15–40–5	35	

March: 7–7–0 (Home: 4–2–0; Road: 3–5–0)

#	Date	Visitor	Score	Home	OT	Decision	Attendance	Record	Points	Recap
61	March 2	Columbus	5–2	Chicago		Soderblom	18,782	15–41–5	35	
62	March 4	Chicago	0–5	Colorado		Mrazek	18,125	15–42–5	35	
63	March 5	Chicago	5–2	Arizona		Soderblom	4,600	16–42–5	37	
64	March 9	Chicago	1–4	Washington		Mrazek	18,573	16–43–5	37	
65	March 10	Arizona	4–7	Chicago		Soderblom	18,666	17–43–5	39	
66	March 12	Anaheim	2–7	Chicago		Mrazek	18,017	18–43–5	41	
67	March 15	Los Angeles	5–0	Chicago		Soderblom	19,528	18–44–5	41	
68	March 17	San Jose	2–5	Chicago		Mrazek	18,426	19–44–5	43	
69	March 19	Chicago	2–6	Los Angeles		Mrazek	18,145	19–45–5	43	
70	March 21	Chicago	0–4	Anaheim		Soderblom	15,880	19–46–5	43	
71	March 23	Chicago	5–4	San Jose	OT	Mrazek	17,435	20–46–5	45	
72	March 26	Calgary	1–3	Chicago		Mrazek	19,404	21–46–5	47	
73	March 28	Chicago	0–2	Ottawa		Mrazek	19,292	21–47–5	47	
74	March 30	Chicago	5–1	Philadelphia		Soderblom	19,250	22–47–5	49	

April: 1–6–1 (Home: 1–3–0; Road: 0–3–1)

#	Date	Visitor	Score	Home	OT	Decision	Attendance	Record	Points	Recap
75	April 2	Chicago	1–2	NY Islanders		Mrazek	17,255	22–48–5	49	
76	April 6	Dallas	2–3	Chicago		Mrazek	19,294	23–48–5	51	
77	April 7	Minnesota	4–0	Chicago		Soderblom	19,636	23–49–5	51	
78	April 10	Chicago	2–5	St. Louis		Mrazek	18,096	23–50–5	51	
79	April 12	Nashville	5–1	Chicago		Soderblom	19,449	23–51–5	51	
80	April 14	Carolina	4–2	Chicago		Mrazek	18,742	23–52–5	51	
81	April 16	Chicago	1–3	Vegas		Mrazek	18,222	23–53–5	51	
82	April 18	Chicago	4–5	Los Angeles	OT	Soderblom	18,145	23–53–6	52	

Legend: Win (2 points) Loss (0 points) Overtime/shootout loss (1 point)

== Player statistics ==
As of April 18, 2024

=== Skaters ===
Regular season
Player	GP	G	A	Pts	+/−	PIM
Connor Bedard	68	22	39	61	−44	28
Philipp Kurashev	75	18	36	54	−44	23
Nick Foligno	74	17	20	37	−29	57
Jason Dickinson	82	22	13	35	+4	43
Tyler Johnson	67	17	14	31	−35	26
Seth Jones	67	8	23	31	−15	34
Ryan Donato	78	12	18	30	−14	26
Joey Anderson	55	5	12	17	+5	8
Lukas Reichel	65	5	11	16	−29	12
Alex Vlasic	76	2	14	16	−4	45
Kevin Korchinski	76	5	10	15	−39	20
Taylor Raddysh	73	5	9	14	−19	22
Colin Blackwell	44	8	4	12	−2	10
MacKenzie Entwistle	67	5	6	11	−29	47
Boris Katchouk^{‡}	38	5	4	9	−2	12
Corey Perry^{‡}	16	4	5	9	−5	12
Andreas Athanasiou	28	2	7	9	−7	7
Jarred Tinordi	52	0	9	9	−27	64
Cole Guttman	27	4	4	8	−17	7
Connor Murphy	46	2	6	8	−19	40
Nikita Zaitsev	38	2	5	7	−5	14
Wyatt Kaiser	32	0	7	7	0	22
Anthony Beauvillier^{‡}	23	2	4	6	−10	2
Isaak Phillips	33	0	6	6	−26	22
Reese Johnson	42	2	3	5	−20	40
Taylor Hall	10	2	2	4	−3	4
Landon Slaggert	16	1	3	4	+1	4
Zach Sanford^{†}	18	0	4	4	−3	2
Louis Crevier	24	0	3	3	−16	4
Jaycob Megna	44	0	2	2	−15	22
Frank Nazar	3	1	0	1	−4	0
Filip Roos	4	0	0	0	−4	0
Ethan Del Mastro	2	0	0	0	0	0
Brett Seney	4	0	0	0	0	6
Rem Pitlick	9	0	0	0	−7	2

=== Goaltenders ===
Regular season
Player	GP	GS	TOI	W	L	OT	GA	GAA	SA	SV%	SO	G	A	PIM
Petr Mrazek	56	53	3,152:40	18	31	4	160	3.05	1,724	.908	1	0	0	14
Arvid Soderblom	32	29	1,744:20	5	22	2	114	3.92	942	.880	0	0	0	0

^{†}Denotes player spent time with another team before joining the Blackhawks. Stats reflect time with the Blackhawks only.
^{‡}Denotes player was traded mid-season. Stats reflect time with the Blackhawks only.
Bold/italics denotes franchise record.

== Transactions ==
The Blackhawks have been involved in the following transactions during the 2023–24 NHL season.

Key:

† Contract is entry-level.
‡ Contract initially takes effect in the 2024–25 season.

=== Trades ===
Date	Details		Ref
June 29, 2023	To New York Islanders Future considerations	To Chicago Blackhawks Josh Bailey; 2nd-round pick in 2026	
June 29, 2023	To Tampa Bay Lightning 7th-round pick in 2024	To Chicago Blackhawks Corey Perry	
November 28, 2023	To Vancouver Canucks Conditional 5th-round pick in 2024	To Chicago Blackhawks Anthony Beauvillier	
January 6, 2024	To Pittsburgh Penguins Conditional 7th-round pick in 2026	To Chicago Blackhawks Rem Pitlick	
March 7, 2024	To Nashville Predators Anthony Beauvillier	To Chicago Blackhawks 5th-round pick in 2024	
June 26, 2024	To Vancouver Canucks 4th-round pick in 2027	To Chicago Blackhawks Sam Lafferty; Ilya Mikheyev*; 2nd-round pick in 2027	

Notes

- Canucks retain 15% of Mikheyev's remaining salary.

=== Players acquired ===
Date	Player	Former team	Term	Via	Ref
July 1, 2023	Ryan Donato	Seattle Kraken	2-year $4 million	Free agency	
January 3, 2024	Jaycob Megna	Seattle Kraken		Waivers	
January 6, 2024	Zach Sanford	Arizona Coyotes		Waivers	

=== Players lost ===
Date	Player	New team	Term	Via	Ref
July 1, 2023	Andreas Englund	Los Angeles Kings	2-year	Free agency	
July 18, 2023	Hunter Drew	Tucson Roadrunners (AHL)	2-year	Free agency	
August 7, 2023	Alex Stalock	Anaheim Ducks	1-year	Free agency	
August 10, 2023	Anders Bjork	Rockford IceHogs (AHL)	1-year	Free agency	
August 10, 2023	Caleb Jones	Carolina Hurricanes	1-year	Free agency	
September 4, 2023	Anton Khudobin	Sokol Krasnoyarsk (VHL)	1-year	Free agency	
September 17, 2023	Jujhar Khaira	Minnesota Wild	1-year	Free agency	
September 21, 2023	Buddy Robinson	Traktor Chelyabinsk (KHL)	1-year	Free agency	
October 29, 2023	Corey Perry			Contract termination	
October 29, 2023	Austin Wagner	IK Oskarshamn (SHL)	1-year	Free agency	
March 8, 2024	Boris Katchouk	Ottawa Senators		Waivers	

=== Signings ===
Date	Player	Term	Ref
June 30, 2023	Corey Perry	1-year $4 million	
July 17, 2023	Connor Bedard	3-year $13.35 million†	
July 23, 2023	Philipp Kurashev	2-year $4.5 million	
July 25, 2023	Samuel Savoie	3-year $2.85 million†	
January 12, 2024	Nick Foligno	2-year $9 million‡	
January 16, 2024	Jason Dickinson	2-year $8.5 million‡	
January 24, 2024	Petr Mrazek	2-year	
April 25, 2024	Alex Vlasic	6-year	
May 7, 2024	Lukas Reichel	2-year	
May 20, 2024	Brett Seney	1-year	
May 28, 2024	Martin Misiak	3-year†	
May 28, 2024	Zach Sanford	1-year	
June 20, 2024	Cole Guttman	1-year	

== Draft picks ==
Below are the Chicago Blackhawks selections at the 2023 NHL entry draft, which was held on June 28 and 29, 2023, at Bridgestone Arena in Nashville, Tennessee.

Round	#	Player	Pos	Nationality	College/Junior/Club team (League)
1	1	Connor Bedard	C	Canada	Regina Pats (WHL)
1	19	Oliver Moore	C	United States	U.S. NTDP (USHL)
2	35	Adam Gajan	G	Slovakia	Chippewa Steel (NAHL)
2	44	Roman Kantserov	RW	Russia	Stalnye Lisy (MHL)
2	55	Martin Misiak	RW	Slovakia	Youngstown Phantoms (USHL)
3	67	Nick Lardis	LW	Canada	Hamilton Bulldogs (OHL)
3	93	Jiri Felcman	C	Czechia	SCL Young Tigers (U20-Elit)
4	99	Alex Pharand	C	Canada	Sudbury Wolves (OHL)
5	131	Marcel Marcel	LW	Czechia	Gatineau Olympiques (QMJHL)
6	167	Milton Oscarson	C	Sweden	Örebro HK (SHL)
7	195	Janne Peltonen	D	Finland	Oulun Kärpät (U20 SM-sarja)
