= Jack Studnicka =

Canadian ice hockey player (born 1999)

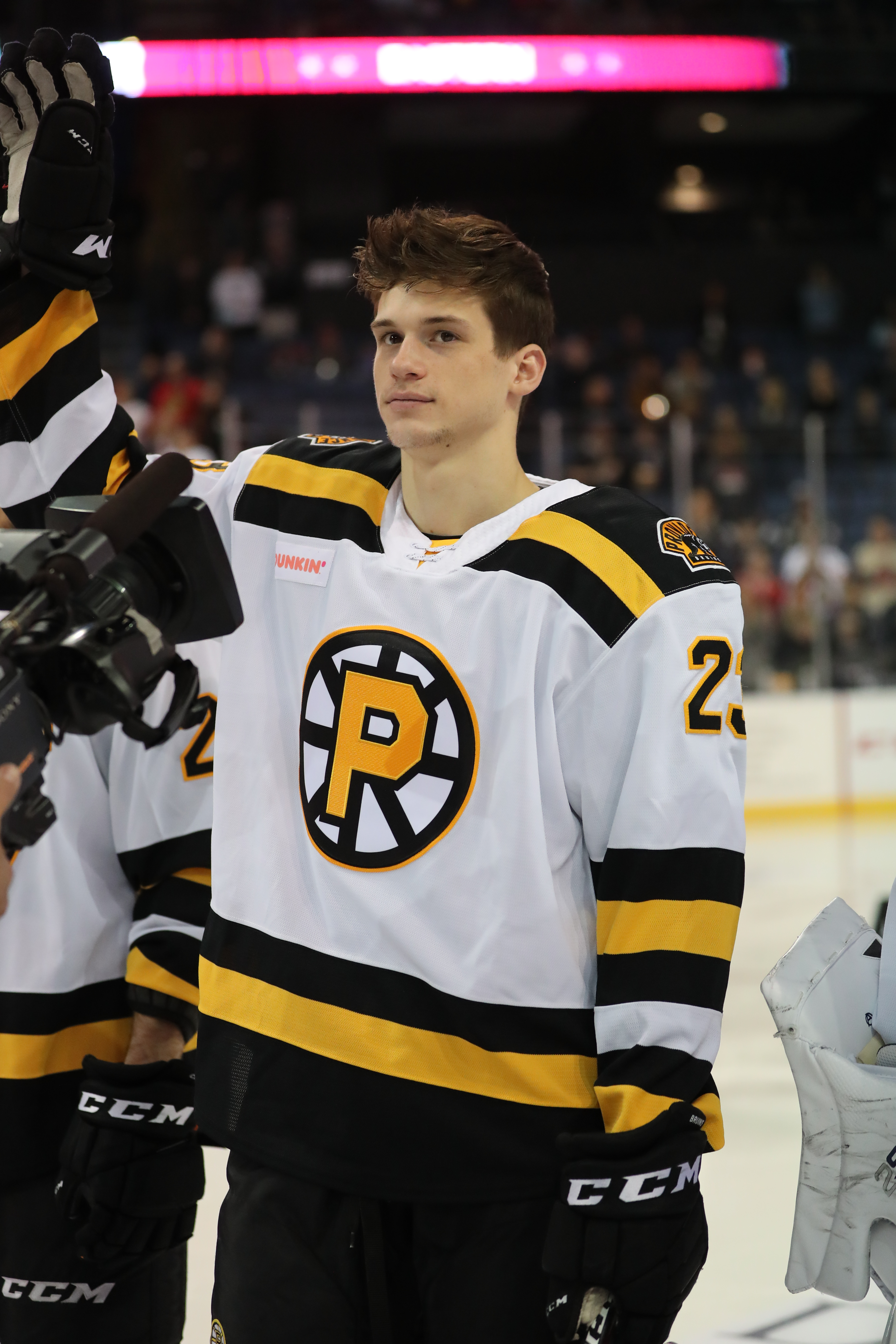
- Studnicka with the Providence Bruins in 2020
- Born: February 18, 1999 (age 27) Tecumseh, Ontario, Canada
- Height: 6 ft 1 in (185 cm)
- Weight: 187 lb (85 kg; 13 st 5 lb)
- Position: Forward
- Shoots: Right
- NHL team (P) Cur. team Former teams: Philadelphia Flyers; Lehigh Valley Phantoms (AHL); Boston Bruins; Vancouver Canucks; San Jose Sharks; Florida Panthers
- NHL draft: 53rd overall, 2017; Boston Bruins
- Playing career: 2018–present

Jack Studnicka (born February 18, 1999) is a Canadian professional ice hockey player who is a forward for the Lehigh Valley Phantoms in the American Hockey League (AHL) while under contract to the Philadelphia Flyers of the National Hockey League (NHL). Studnicka was drafted in the second round (53rd overall) by the Boston Bruins in the 2017 NHL entry draft.

After moving to Novi, Michigan, in 2013, Studnicka played minor and midget hockey for Compuware and Belle Tire U14 teams. Following the 2014–15 season, in which he scored 29 goals and 56 assists through 67 games, Studnicka was drafted 21st overall by the Oshawa Generals in the Ontario Hockey League (OHL) Priority Selection Draft. He played four seasons with the Generals, serving them as captain for one and a half, before being traded to the Niagara IceDogs in 2019.

== Early life ==
Studnicka was born on February 18, 1999, in Tecumseh, Ontario to parents Todd Studnicka and Mary Beth Laing. He was born into an athletic family as his father Todd played college ice hockey for the University of Maine while his older brother Sam played in the Ontario Hockey League (OHL). Likewise, his step brother Ryan McInchak plays goaltender for Cornell University and his cousin Joey most recently played in the Greater Ontario Junior Hockey League. In 2013, Studnicka moved to Novi, Michigan, with his father after he got a job with Consumers Energy in order to have his support while preparing for major junior hockey.

== Playing career ==
=== Amateur ===
Although he grew up in Canada, Studnicka played minor and midget hockey for Compuware and Belle Tire in Michigan. During his time with the Belle Tire, Studnicka was coached by Kyle Krug, the father of NHL defenceman Torey Krug. In his final season with the Belle Tire, Studnicka scored 29 goals and 56 assists for 85 points through 67 games and played for the TPH Thunder Minor Midget program at the 2015 OHL Cup. He finished the OHL Cup leading the team with one goal and three assists through four games. Upon concluding the 2014–15 season with the Belle Tire, Studnicka was drafted 21st overall by the Oshawa Generals in the Ontario Hockey League Priority Selection Draft. Leading up to the draft, Studnicka was described as a power pivot who displays a methodical stick handling attack, using subtle puck placement over dangling options." Prior to starting his rookie season with the Generals, Studnicka was invited to the Team Canada U17 development camp where he scored one goal and one assist for two points over three games. He began his rookie season with the Generals during the 2015–16 season and immediately tallied five assists through six games. As a result of his play, Studnicka represented Team Canada at the 2015 World U-17 Hockey Challenge where he tallied five points in six games. Upon returning to the OHL, Studnicka eventually tallied his first goal on December 13 against the Saginaw Spirit after recording 12 assists through 26 games. He finished the 2015–16 season leading all team rookies with four goals and 22 assists for 26 points over 62 games. Following his rookie season, Studnicka again represented Team Canada on the international stage at the 2016 Ivan Hlinka Memorial Tournament.

Leading up to the 2017 NHL entry draft, Studnicka was ranked 80th among North American skaters by the NHL Central Scouting Bureau in their midterm ranking list. He was eventually drafted in the second round, 53rd overall, by the Boston Bruins after finishing the 2016–17 season with a career-high 18 goals and 34 assists. He was also able to graduate from Northville High School by taking online classes for his final semester. Following the draft, Studnicka participated in the Bruins 2017 Rookie Camp and at the Prospects Challenge in Buffalo where he scored one goal and two assists. After impressing at the tournament, Studnicka also participated in the Bruins Training Camp and made his preseason debut against the Montreal Canadiens on September 18 before being returned to Oshawa on September 21. Upon returning to the Generals, Studnicka was named team captain for the 2017–18 season. He became the youngest team captain in franchise history since Boone Jenner in the 2011–12 season. In his first two games as captain, Studnicka posted two goals and three assists for five points and he signed a three-year, entry-level contract with the Bruins on September 26, 2017. At the conclusion of the 2017–18 season, Studnicka joined the Bruins American Hockey League (AHL) affiliate, the Providence Bruins, for the remainder of the season. In five regular season games, he tallied one goal and four assists for five points in the AHL. He scored his first professional goal on April 14 to help lead the Bruins to a 5–0 shutout win over the Springfield Thunderbirds.

After again participating in the Bruins training camp and preseason, Studnicka returned to the Generals for the 2018–19 season. While with the Bruins, he centred Brad Marchand and David Pastrňák for one game during their exhibition series in China. On January 8, 2019, Studnicka and teammate Matt Brassard were traded to the Niagara IceDogs in exchange for Lleyton Moore and six draft picks. He made an immediate impact on the team upon joining them, scoring seven goals and eight assists for 15 points over nine games. At the end of January, Studnicka was named an assistant captain for the IceDogs. On February 21, Studnicka recorded a career-high four goals in one game to lead the IceDogs 10–2 over the Kitchener Rangers. The following month, he recorded a career-high five points in one game to help lift the IceDogs 7–4 over the Barrie Colts. Studnickaup finished the regular season with 36 goals and 47 assists for 83 points over 60 games between Niagara and Oshawa. His scoring prowess continued into the 2019 playoffs as he led the team in their first round series against the North Bay Battalion with four goals and four assists. During Game 5 of the IceDogs first round playoff series against the Battalion, Studnickaup tallied a goal and two assists to push the IceDogs into the second round for the fourth time in five years. Studnicka and the IceDogs then faced his former team in the second round, where they lost to the Generals.

=== Professional ===
==== Boston Bruins ====
Following the IceDog's elimination from the 2019 playoffs, Studnicka joined the Providence Bruins to help them in the 2019 Calder Cup playoffs run. He scored his first playoff goal and assist with the Bruins in his second game to help lead them to an eventual 4–2 win over the Charlotte Checkers. These would prove to be his only points as the Bruins fell to the Checkers in four games.

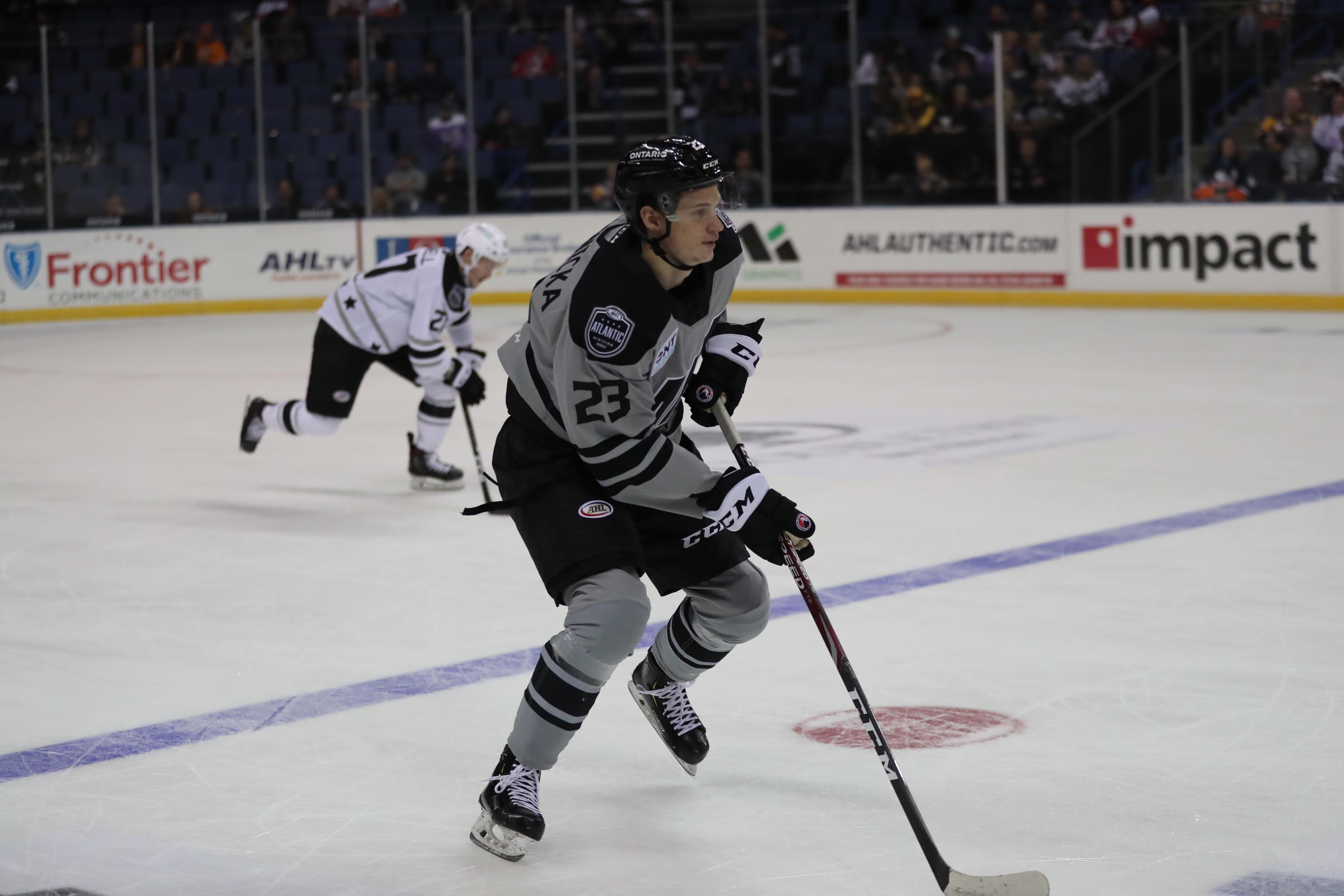
Studnicka during the 2020 AHL All-Star Game.

Studnicka returned to the Bruins for their 2019 training and development camp with an added 10 pounds of muscle. On September 30, Studnicka was one of four players assigned to the AHL to start the 2019–20 season. Studnicka made an immediate impact with the Providence Bruins upon joining them and quickly accumulated nine goals and nine assists for 18 points through 21 games. Following an injury to Patrice Bergeron in late November, Studnicka earned his first NHL call up on November 26. He subsequently made his NHL debut that night against the Montreal Canadiens, where he registered his first career NHL assist to help lead the Bruins to an 8–1 win. Studnicka went on to play one more game with the Bruins that season before being re-assigned to Providence. Despite missing a few games while in the NHL, Studnicka continued to improve upon returning to Providence and ranked second among rookies in goals by the end of December. His 14 goals and 12 assists earned him a selection for the 2020 AHL All-Star Game. Following the All-Star Break, Studnicka continued to score and quickly tallied eight goals and eight assists for 16 points over 12 games. His efforts also helped the Providence Bruins win 11 consecutive games to match a franchise record set in 1998–99. When the 2019–20 season was cut short in March due to the COVID-19 pandemic, Studnicka was leading the Providence Bruins in goals with 23, assists with 26, and points with 49. As such, he was selected for the 20219–20 AHL All-Rookie Team.

While the AHL season had concluded in March, the NHL resumed play for the 2020 Stanley Cup playoffs on August 1, 2020. When the Bruins initiated their return to play training camp, Studnicka was one of the players included on their roster. While the league had been paused, Studnicka trained and tested himself out in a winger position in an effort to be more versatile and crack a strong Bruins lineup. While attending the Bruins 2021 training camp, Studnicka replaced an injured David Pastrnak on right wing beside Brad Marchand and Patrice Bergeron. For the first time in his career, Studnicka began the 2020–21 season at the NHL level while playing right wing on the Bruins top line. In this role, he scored his first career NHL goal on January 21 against the Philadelphia Flyers. Following an injury in February, Studnicka was assigned to the AHL to get some more playing time as a winger. He finished the regular season with a team leading 23 goals, seven of which came on the power-play.

During the 2021 offseason, Studnicka again tried to put on more weight before training camp began in an effort to become more stable when receiving hits. While he spent the majority of the 2021–22 season in the AHL, Studnicka appeared in 15 NHL games where he recorded three assists. As a restricted free agent, Studnicka was re-signed by the Bruins to a two-year contract extension on July 23, 2022.

==== Vancouver Canucks ====
Studnicka began the 2022–23 season with the Bruins, primarily serving as a healthy scratch and appearing in just one game before he was traded by the Bruins to the Vancouver Canucks in exchange for goaltender Michael DiPietro and defensive prospect Jonathan Myrenberg on October 27, 2022. Shortly after joining the Canucks, Studnicka was placed on injured reserve with an undisclosed injury on November 15. Although Studnicka also earned limited ice time in Vancouver, he often played between with Nils Åman and Dakota Joshua. The line was often referred to as the "Crazy 8s" due to their jersey numbers all having the number 8. Following the All-Star break in January, Studnicka scored four goals and four assists through 47 games. He averaged 10:39 minutes per outing but remained scratched for nearly every game in March. Studnicka later explained his lack of scoring due to him being tentative with a new team.

Entering the last year of his contract, Studnicka returned to Vancouver for the 2023–24 season with 10 pounds of added muscle. Although he was originally re-assigned to the Canucks AHL affiliate, the Abbotsford Canucks, to start the season, he was an emergency recall on October 12.

==== San Jose Sharks ====
On December 15, 2023, Studnicka was traded to the San Jose Sharks in exchange for Nick Cicek and a 2024 sixth-round pick.

==== Los Angeles Kings ====
After the 2023–24 season and having concluded his contract with the Sharks, Studnicka signed as a free agent to a one-year, two-way contract with the Los Angeles Kings on July 1, 2024.

==== Florida Panthers ====
After the 2024–25 season, Studnicka was not extended a qualifying offer, making him an unrestricted free agent. On July 2, 2025, he signed a one-year, two-way contract with the Florida Panthers.

==== Philadelphia Flyers ====
On July 1, 2026, Studnicka signed a two-year, two-way contract with the Philadelphia Flyers.

== Career statistics ==
=== Regular season and playoffs ===
			Regular season					Playoffs
Season	Team	League	GP	G	A	Pts	PIM	GP	G	A	Pts	PIM
2014–15	Belle Tire U16	T1EHL	32	9	32	41	24	4	1	0	1	7
2015–16	Oshawa Generals	OHL	62	4	22	26	25	5	0	0	0	2
2016–17	Oshawa Generals	OHL	64	18	34	36	11	5	10	15	6
2017–18	Oshawa Generals	OHL	66	22	50	72	43	5	1	4	5	13
2017–18	Providence Bruins	AHL	5	1	4	5	0	—	—	—	—	—
2018–19	Oshawa Generals	OHL	30	12	22	34	28	—	—	—	—	—
2018–19	Niagara IceDogs	OHL	30	24	25	49	24	11	5	6	11	16
2018–19	Providence Bruins	AHL	—	—	—	—	—	4	1	1	2	4
2019–20	Providence Bruins	AHL	60	23	26	49	30	—	—	—	—	—
2019–20	Boston Bruins	NHL	2	0	1	1	2	5	0	0	0	2
2020–21	Boston Bruins	NHL	20	1	2	3	0	—	—	—	—	—
2020–21	Providence Bruins	AHL	11	0	7	7	15	—	—	—	—	—
2021–22	Providence Bruins	AHL	41	10	25	35	36	2	0	1	1	0
2021–22	Boston Bruins	NHL	15	0	3	3	4	—	—	—	—	—
2022–23	Boston Bruins	NHL	1	0	0	0	4	—	—	—	—	—
2022–23	Vancouver Canucks	NHL	47	4	4	8	12	—	—	—	—	—
2023–24	Vancouver Canucks	NHL	5	1	0	1	0	—	—	—	—	—
2023–24	Abbotsford Canucks	AHL	9	1	6	7	6	—	—	—	—	—
2023–24	San Jose Sharks	NHL	17	0	0	0	6	—	—	—	—	—
2023–24	San Jose Barracuda	AHL	36	7	14	21	18	—	—	—	—	—
2024–25	Ontario Reign	AHL	72	16	29	45	64	2	0	0	0	0
2025–26	Florida Panthers	NHL	19	0	0	0	4	—	—	—	—	—
2025–26	Charlotte Checkers	AHL	41	12	18	30	34	3	2	3	5	0
NHL totals			126	6	10	16	32	5	0	0	0	2

=== International ===
Year	Team	Event	GP	G	A	Pts	PIM
2015	Canada Red	U17	6	1	4	5	0
2016	Canada	IH18	4	0	0	0	0
2017	Canada	U18	3	3	0	3	0
2019	Canada	WJC	5	1	3	4	0
Junior totals			18	5	7	12	0

== Awards and honours ==
Award	Year
AHL
AHL All-Star Game	2020
AHL All-Rookie Team	2020
