= 2023–24 Calgary Flames season =

National Hockey League season

2023–24 Calgary Flames
- Division: 5th Pacific
- Conference: 11th Western
- 2023–24 record: 38–39–5
- Home record: 21–19–1
- Road record: 17–20–4
- Goals for: 253
- Goals against: 271

Team information
- General manager: Craig Conroy
- Coach: Ryan Huska
- Captain: Mikael Backlund
- Alternate captains: Rasmus Andersson; Jonathan Huberdeau; Elias Lindholm (Oct. 11 – Jan. 31); Christopher Tanev (Oct. 11 – Feb. 28)
- Arena: Scotiabank Saddledome
- Average attendance: 17,490
- Minor league affiliates: Calgary Wranglers (AHL); Rapid City Rush (ECHL)

Team leaders
- Goals: Yegor Sharangovich (31)
- Assists: Nazem Kadri (46)
- Points: Nazem Kadri (75)
- Penalty minutes: Martin Pospisil (107)
- Plus/minus: Blake Coleman (+19)
- Wins: Jacob Markstrom (23)
- Goals against average: Jacob Markstrom (2.78)

The 2023–24 Calgary Flames season was their 44th season in Calgary, and the 52nd season for the National Hockey League (NHL) franchise that was established on June 6, 1972.

On April 4, 2024, the Flames were eliminated from playoff contention for the second consecutive season after a 5–2 loss to the Winnipeg Jets.

== Standings ==
=== Divisional standings ===
Pacific Division
Pos	Team	GP	W	L	OTL	RW	GF	GA	GD	Pts
1	y – Vancouver Canucks	82	50	23	9	44	279	223	+56	109
2	x – Edmonton Oilers	82	49	27	6	39	294	237	+57	104
3	x – Los Angeles Kings	82	44	27	11	37	256	215	+41	99
4	x – Vegas Golden Knights	82	45	29	8	34	267	245	+22	98
5	Calgary Flames	82	38	39	5	32	253	271	−18	81
6	Seattle Kraken	82	34	35	13	28	217	236	−19	81
7	Anaheim Ducks	82	27	50	5	21	204	295	−91	59
8	San Jose Sharks	82	19	54	9	14	181	331	−150	47

Source: National Hockey League
Rules for classification: 1) Fewer number of games played (GP, only during regular season); 2) Greater number of regulation wins (RW); 3) Greater number of wins in regulation and overtime, excluding shootout wins (ROW); 4) Greater number of total wins, including shootouts (W); 5) Greater number of points earned in head-to-head play; if teams played an uneven number of head-to-head games, the result of the first game on the home ice of the team with the extra home game is discarded; 6) Greater goal differential (GD); 7) Greater number of goals scored (GF)
x – Clinched playoff spot; y – Clinched division

=== Conference standings ===
Western Conference Wild Card
Pos	Div	Team	GP	W	L	OTL	RW	GF	GA	GD	Pts
1	CE	x – Nashville Predators	82	47	30	5	38	269	248	+21	99
2	PA	x – Vegas Golden Knights	82	45	29	8	34	267	245	+22	98
3	CE	St. Louis Blues	82	43	33	6	31	239	250	−11	92
4	CE	Minnesota Wild	82	39	34	9	32	251	263	−12	87
5	PA	Calgary Flames	82	38	39	5	32	253	271	−18	81
6	PA	Seattle Kraken	82	34	35	13	28	217	236	−19	81
7	CE	Arizona Coyotes	82	36	41	5	28	256	274	−18	77
8	PA	Anaheim Ducks	82	27	50	5	21	204	295	−91	59
9	CE	Chicago Blackhawks	82	23	53	6	17	179	290	−111	52
10	PA	San Jose Sharks	82	19	54	9	14	181	331	−150	47

Source: National Hockey League
Rules for classification: 1) Fewer number of games played (GP, only during regular season); 2) Greater number of regulation wins (RW); 3) Greater number of wins in regulation and overtime, excluding shootout wins (ROW); 4) Greater number of total wins, including shootouts (W); 5) Greater number of points earned in head-to-head play; if teams played an uneven number of head-to-head games, the result of the first game on the home ice of the team with the extra home game is discarded; 6) Greater goal differential (GD); 7) Greater number of goals scored (GF)
x – Clinched playoff spot

== Schedule and results ==
=== Preseason ===
The preseason schedule was published on June 23, 2023. It begins for the Flames on September 15 with 3 games at the Young Stars tournament in Penticton. The full squad started preseason on September 24, 2023.

=== Young Stars tournament ===
2023 Young Stars tournament game log: 2–1–0
#	Date	Visitor	Score	Home	OT	Decision	Attendance	Record	Recap
1	September 15	Calgary	1–7	Vancouver				0–1–0
2	September 16	Calgary	4–3	Edmonton	OT			1–1–0
3	September 18	Winnipeg	2–4	Calgary				2–1–0
Notes: Games played at the South Okanagan Events Centre in Penticton, British Columbia.

=== Preseason ===
2023 preseason game log: 4–3–1 (Home: 2–1–1; Road: 2–2–0)
#	Date	Visitor	Score	Home	OT	Decision	Attendance	Record	Recap
1	September 24	Vancouver	0–10	Calgary		Markstrom	15,452	1–0–0
2^{[A]}	September 25	Seattle	5–3	Calgary		Wolf	15,205	1–1–0
3^{[A]}	September 25	Calgary	3–2	Seattle	SO	Vladar	10,000	2–1–0
4	September 27	Calgary	3–2	Winnipeg	SO	Wolf	11,673	3–1–0
5	September 29	Edmonton	2–1	Calgary	OT	Vladar	17,965	3–1–1
6	October 2	Winnipeg	4–5	Calgary		Markstrom	16,697	4–1–1
7	October 4	Calgary	2–7	Edmonton		Vladar	18,197	4–2–1
8	October 6	Calgary	1–3	Vancouver		Markstrom	18,353	4–3–1
Notes:^{A} Indicates split-squad.

=== Regular season ===
2023–24 game log

October: 2–6–1 (Home: 1–2–0; Road: 1–4–1)
#	Date	Visitor	Score	Home	OT	Decision	Attendance	Record	Points	Recap
1	October 11	Winnipeg	3–5	Calgary		Markstrom	17,414	1–0–0	2
2	October 14	Calgary	2–5	Pittsburgh		Markstrom	17,635	1–1–0	2
3	October 16	Calgary	2–3	Washington	SO	Markstrom	16,489	1–1–1	3
4	October 19	Calgary	4–3	Buffalo		Vladar	13,025	2–1–1	5
5	October 20	Calgary	1–3	Columbus		Markstrom	16,276	2–2–1	5
6	October 22	Calgary	2–6	Detroit		Vladar	17,626	2–3–1	5
7	October 24	NY Rangers	3–1	Calgary		Markstrom	16,800	2–4–1	5
8	October 26	St. Louis	3–0	Calgary		Markstrom	16,897	2–5–1	5
9	October 29	Calgary	2–5	Edmonton		Markstrom	55,411 (outdoors)	2–6–1	5

November: 8–4–2 (Home: 4–1–1; Road: 4–3–1)
#	Date	Visitor	Score	Home	OT	Decision	Attendance	Record	Points	Recap
10	November 1	Dallas	4–3	Calgary		Markstrom	16,786	2–7–1	5
11	November 4	Calgary	6–3	Seattle		Vladar	17,151	3–7–1	7
12	November 7	Nashville	2–4	Calgary		Markstrom	16,975	4–7–1	9
13	November 10	Calgary	4–5	Toronto	SO	Vladar	18,939	4–7–2	10
14	November 11	Calgary	1–4	Ottawa		Wolf	18,874	4–8–2	10
15	November 14	Calgary	2–1	Montreal		Markstrom	21,105	5–8–2	12
16	November 16	Vancouver	2–5	Calgary		Markstrom	17,501	6–8–2	14
17	November 18	NY Islanders	5–4	Calgary	SO	Markstrom	17,167	6–8–3	15
18	November 20	Calgary	4–3	Seattle	OT	Vladar	17,151	7–8–3	17
19	November 22	Calgary	2–4	Nashville		Markstrom	17,252	7–9–3	17
20	November 24	Calgary	7–4	Dallas		Markstrom	18,532	8–9–3	19
21	November 25	Calgary	1–3	Colorado		Vladar	18,139	8–10–3	19
22	November 27	Vegas	1–2	Calgary	OT	Vladar	17,031	9–10–3	21
23	November 30	Dallas	3–4	Calgary	OT	Markstrom	16,941	10–10–3	23

December: 5–6–2 (Home: 4–4–0; Road: 1–2–2)
#	Date	Visitor	Score	Home	OT	Decision	Attendance	Record	Points	Recap
24	December 2	Vancouver	4–3	Calgary		Markstrom	19,079	10–11–3	23
25	December 5	Minnesota	5–2	Calgary		Vladar	16,661	10–12–3	23
26	December 7	Carolina	2–3	Calgary		Wolf	16,983	11–12–3	25
27	December 9	New Jersey	4–2	Calgary		Wolf	17,597	11–13–3	25
28	December 11	Calgary	5–6	Colorado		Vladar	17,967	11–14–3	25
29	December 12	Calgary	4–5	Vegas	OT	Wolf	17,814	11–14–4	26
30	December 14	Calgary	2–3	Minnesota	SO	Vladar	18,167	11–14–5	27
31	December 16	Tampa Bay	2–4	Calgary		Vladar	16,801	12–14–5	29
32	December 18	Florida	1–3	Calgary		Markstrom	16,813	13–14–5	31
33	December 21	Calgary	3–0	Anaheim		Markstrom	16,102	14–14–5	33
34	December 23	Calgary	3–5	Los Angeles		Markstrom	18,145	14–15–5	33
35	December 27	Seattle	2–1	Calgary		Markstrom	18,881	14–16–5	33
36	December 31	Philadelphia	3–4	Calgary		Markstrom	18,723	15–16–5	35

January: 7–6–0 (Home: 3–4–0; Road: 4–2–0)
#	Date	Visitor	Score	Home	OT	Decision	Attendance	Record	Points	Recap
37	January 2	Calgary	3–1	Minnesota		Markstrom	18,456	16–16–5	37
38	January 4	Calgary	6–3	Nashville		Vladar	17,203	17–16–5	39
39	January 6	Calgary	2–3	Philadelphia		Markstrom	19,715	17–17–5	39
40	January 7	Calgary	3–4	Chicago		Vladar	19,907	17–18–5	39
41	January 9	Ottawa	3–6	Calgary		Markstrom	17,219	18–18–5	41
42	January 11	Calgary	6–2	Arizona		Markstrom	4,600	19–18–5	43
43	January 13	Calgary	3–1	Vegas		Markstrom	17,858	20–18–5	45
44	January 16	Arizona	2–3	Calgary	OT	Vladar	17,407	21–18–5	47
45	January 18	Toronto	4–3	Calgary		Vladar	18,714	21–19–5	47
46	January 20	Edmonton	3–1	Calgary		Vladar	19,289	21–20–5	47
47	January 23	St. Louis	4–3	Calgary		Markstrom	16,813	21–21–5	47
48	January 25	Columbus	5–2	Calgary		Markstrom	16,889	21–22–5	47
49	January 27	Chicago	0–1	Calgary		Markstrom	18,279	22–22–5	49

February: 7–3–0 (Home: 3–2–0; Road: 4–1–0)
#	Date	Visitor	Score	Home	OT	Decision	Attendance	Record	Points	Recap
50	February 6	Calgary	4–1	Boston		Markstrom	17,850	23–22–5	51
51	February 8	Calgary	5–3	New Jersey		Markstrom	16,374	24–22–5	53
52	February 10	Calgary	5–2	NY Islanders		Markstrom	17,255	25–22–5	55
53	February 12	Calgary	0–2	NY Rangers		Markstrom	18,006	25–23–5	55
54	February 15	San Jose	6–3	Calgary		Wolf	16,852	25–24–5	55
55	February 17	Detroit	5–0	Calgary		Markstrom	17,854	25–25–5	55
56	February 19	Winnipeg	3–6	Calgary		Markstrom	18,037	26–25–5	57
57	February 22	Boston	2–3	Calgary	OT	Markstrom	17,750	27–25–5	59
58	February 24	Calgary	6–3	Edmonton		Vladar	18,347	28–25–5	61
59	February 27	Los Angeles	2–4	Calgary		Markstrom	16,450	29–25–5	63

March: 5–9–0 (Home: 4–4–0; Road: 1–5–0)
#	Date	Visitor	Score	Home	OT	Decision	Attendance	Record	Points	Recap
60	March 2	Pittsburgh	3–4	Calgary		Markstrom	19,289	30–25–5	65
61	March 4	Seattle	4–2	Calgary		Markstrom	16,516	30–26–5	65
62	March 7	Calgary	6–3	Tampa Bay		Markstrom	19,092	31–26–5	67
63	March 9	Calgary	1–5	Florida		Markstrom	19,358	31–27–5	67
64	March 10	Calgary	2–7	Carolina		Vladar	18,728	31–28–5	67
65	March 12	Colorado	6–2	Calgary		Vladar	17,185	31–29–5	67
66	March 14	Vegas	1–4	Calgary		Wolf	16,998	32–29–5	69
67	March 16	Montreal	2–5	Calgary		Wolf	19,183	33–29–5	71
68	March 18	Washington	5–2	Calgary		Wolf	16,793	33–30–5	71
69	March 23	Calgary	2–4	Vancouver		Markstrom	18,903	33–31–5	71
70	March 24	Buffalo	4–1	Calgary		Wolf	16,497	33–32–5	71
71	March 26	Calgary	1–3	Chicago		Markstrom	19,404	33–33–5	71
72	March 28	Calgary	3–5	St. Louis		Wolf	18,096	33–34–5	71
73	March 30	Los Angeles	2–4	Calgary		Markstrom	17,517	34–34–5	73

April: 4–5–0 (Home: 2–2–0; Road: 2–3–0)
#	Date	Visitor	Score	Home	OT	Decision	Attendance	Record	Points	Recap
74	April 2	Anaheim	5–3	Calgary		Markstrom	16,698	34–35–5	73
75	April 4	Calgary	2–5	Winnipeg		Wolf	14,055	34–36–5	73
76	April 6	Edmonton	4–2	Calgary		Markstrom	19,289	34–37–5	73
77	April 9	Calgary	3–2	San Jose	OT	Wolf	11,031	35–37–5	75
78	April 11	Calgary	1–4	Los Angeles		Markstrom	17,340	35–38–5	75
79	April 12	Calgary	6–3	Anaheim		Wolf	17,174	36–38–5	77
80	April 14	Arizona	5–6	Calgary		Wolf	17,247	37–38–5	79
81	April 16	Calgary	1–4	Vancouver		Markstrom	18,918	37–39–5	79
82	April 18	San Jose	1–5	Calgary		Wolf	17,946	38–39–5	81

Legend: Win (2 points) Loss (0 points) Overtime/shootout loss (1 point)

== Player statistics ==
As of April 18, 2024

=== Skaters ===
Regular season
Player	GP	G	A	Pts	+/−	PIM
Nazem Kadri	82	29	46	75	0	43
Yegor Sharangovich	82	31	28	59	–29	8
Blake Coleman	78	30	24	54	+19	76
MacKenzie Weegar	82	20	32	52	+2	51
Jonathan Huberdeau	81	12	40	52	−29	49
Andrew Mangiapane	75	14	26	40	+7	47
Mikael Backlund	82	15	24	39	−4	24
Rasmus Andersson	78	9	30	39	–11	47
Noah Hanifin^{‡}	61	11	24	35	+13	22
Connor Zary	63	14	20	34	+12	22
Elias Lindholm^{‡}	49	9	23	32	–8	21
Andrei Kuzmenko^{†}	29	14	11	25	–8	6
Martin Pospisil	63	8	16	24	+14	109
Christopher Tanev^{‡}	56	1	13	14	+16	14
A. J. Greer	59	6	6	12	–7	35
Matthew Coronato	34	3	6	9	−15	4
Adam Ruzicka^{‡}	39	3	6	9	−8	6
Oliver Kylington	33	3	5	8	−6	12
Dryden Hunt	28	3	5	8	+1	7
Daniil Miromanov^{†}	20	3	4	7	0	8
Dillon Dube	43	3	4	7	−13	8
Walker Duehr	40	2	5	7	–3	6
Dennis Gilbert	34	1	6	7	–7	16
Nikita Zadorov^{‡}	21	1	5	6	−6	23
Nick DeSimone^{‡}	23	1	4	5	–4	2
Kevin Rooney	33	3	1	4	–4	2
Jakob Pelletier	13	1	2	3	+1	2
Ilya Solovyov	10	0	3	3	−3	4
Joel Hanley^{†}	10	1	1	2	0	7
Jordan Oesterle	22	0	2	2	−6	4
Adam Klapka	6	1	0	1	−1	19
Nikita Okhotiuk^{†}	9	0	1	1	−2	4
Brayden Pachal^{†}	26	0	4	4	0	33
Yan Kuznetsov	1	0	0	0	−1	0
Cole Schwindt	4	0	0	0	−1	2

=== Goaltenders ===
Regular season
Player	GP	GS	TOI	W	L	OT	GA	GAA	SA	SV%	SO	G	A	PIM
Jacob Markstrom	48	48	2,831:07	23	23	2	131	2.78	1,379	.905	2	0	5	0
Daniel Vladar	20	19	1,128:31	8	9	2	68	3.62	574	.882	0	0	0	0
Dustin Wolf	17	15	950:30	7	7	1	50	3.16	467	.893	0	0	0	0

^{†}Denotes player spent time with another team before joining the Flames. Stats reflect time with the Flames only.
^{‡}Denotes player was traded mid-season. Stats reflect time with the Flames only.
Bold/italics denotes franchise record.

== Transactions ==
The Flames have been involved in the following transactions during the 2023–24 season.

=== Key ===
† Contract is entry-level.
‡ Contract initially takes effect in the 2024–25 season.

=== Trades ===
Date	Details		Ref
November 30, 2023	To Vancouver Canucks Nikita Zadorov	To Calgary Flames CHI Conditional 5th-round pick in 2024^{1} VAN 3rd-round pick in 2026	
January 31, 2024	To Vancouver Canucks Elias Lindholm	To Calgary Flames Hunter Brzustewicz; Joni Jurmo; Andrei Kuzmenko; VAN 1st-round pick in 2024; VAN Conditional 4th-round pick in 2024^{2}	
February 28, 2024	To Dallas Stars Cole Brady	To Calgary Flames Artem Grushnikov; 2nd-round pick in 2024 conditional 3rd-round pick in 2026	
February 28, 2024	To New Jersey Devils Christopher Tanev*	To Calgary Flames Cole Brady	
March 6, 2024	To Philadelphia Flyers Noah Hanifin*	To Calgary Flames Mikhail Vorobyev	
March 6, 2024	To Vegas Golden Knights Mikhail Vorobyev	To Calgary Flames Daniil Miromanov conditional 1st-round pick in 2025 or 1st-round pick in 2026 conditional 2nd-round pick in 2025 or 3rd-round pick in 2025	
March 7, 2024	To Dallas Stars Mathias Emilio Pettersen	To Calgary Flames Riley Damiani	
March 8, 2024	To San Jose Sharks Conditional 5th-round pick in 2024^{8}	To Calgary Flames Nikita Okhotiuk	
June 19, 2024	To New Jersey Devils Jacob Markstrom	To Calgary Flames Kevin Bahl; 1st-round pick in 2025	
June 27, 2024	To Washington Capitals Andrew Mangiapane	To Calgary Flames COL 2nd-round pick in 2025	

==== Notes ====
1. The Flames will receive the higher of the two Chicago Blackhawks' fifth-round picks in the 2024 NHL Entry Draft.
2. The Flames will receive the Vancouver Canucks' third-round pick instead of the fourth-round pick in the 2024 NHL Entry Draft if the Canucks make the Western Conference Final. If the pick remains a fourth-round pick, Calgary will receive the higher of Vancouver's or the New Jersey Devils' pick.
3. The Flames retain 50% of Tanev's salary and the New Jersey Devils will retain 25%.
4. The Flames will only receive the Dallas Stars' third-round pick in the 2026 NHL Entry Draft if the Stars make the 2024 Stanley Cup Finals.
5. The Flames retain 50% of Hanifin's salary and the Philadelphia Flyers will retain 25%.
6. The Flames will receive Vegas' second-round pick instead of the third-round pick in the 2025 NHL Entry Draft if the Golden Knights win a round in the 2024 Stanley Cup playoffs.
7. The Flames received the Vegas Golden Knights' first-round pick in the 2026 NHL Entry Draft after Vegas traded their 2025 first-round pick to the San Jose Sharks for Tomas Hertl.
8. The Sharks will receive the higher of the fifth-round picks that Chicago possesses in the 2024 NHL Entry Draft.

=== Players acquired ===
Date	Player	Former team	Term	Via	Ref
July 2, 2023	Jordan Oesterle	Detroit Red Wings	1-year	Free agency	
July 3, 2023	Brady Lyle	St. Louis Blues	1-year	Free agency	
December 2, 2023	Mark Pysyk	Wilkes-Barre/Scranton Penguins (AHL)	1-year	Free agency	
February 4, 2024	Brayden Pachal	Vegas Golden Knights		Waivers	

=== Players lost ===
Date	Player	New team	Term	Via	Ref
July 1, 2023	Trevor Lewis	Los Angeles Kings	1-year	Free agency	
July 1, 2023	Milan Lucic	Boston Bruins	1-year	Free agency	
July 1, 2023	Troy Stecher	Arizona Coyotes	1-year	Free agency	
July 2, 2023	Matthew Phillips	Washington Capitals	1-year	Free agency	
July 5, 2023	Michael Stone			Retirement	
October 4, 2023	Nicolas Meloche	Salavat Yulaev Ufa (KHL)	1-year	Free agency	
January 25, 2024	Nick DeSimone	New Jersey Devils		Waivers	
January 25, 2024	Adam Ruzicka	Arizona Coyotes		Waivers	

=== Signings ===
Date	Player	Term	Ref
June 28, 2023	Yegor Sharangovich	2-year	
July 2, 2023	Dryden Hunt	2-year	
July 2, 2023	Colton Poolman	1-year	
July 2, 2023	Martin Pospisil	1-year	
July 6, 2023	Ben Jones	1-year	
July 6, 2023	Mathias Emilio Pettersen	1-year	
July 26, 2023	Samuel Honzek	3-year†	
September 21, 2023	Parker Bell	3-year†	
September 27, 2023	Mikael Backlund	2-year‡	
February 7, 2024	Martin Pospisil	2-year	

== Draft picks ==
Below are the Calgary Flames selections at the 2023 NHL entry draft, which will be held on June 28 and 29, 2023, at Bridgestone Arena in Nashville, Tennessee.

Round	#	Player	Pos	Nationality	College/Junior/Club team (League)
1	16	Samuel Honzek	LW	Slovakia	Vancouver Giants (WHL)
2	48	Etienne Morin	D	Canada	Moncton Wildcats (QMJHL)
3	80 (Note: The Calgary Flames' third-round pick was re-acquired as the result of a trade on June 27, 2023, that sent Tyler Toffoli to New Jersey in exchange for Yegor Sharangovich and this pick. New Jersey previously acquired this pick as the result of a trade on June 9, 2023, that sent Damon Severson to Columbus in exchange for this pick. Columbus previously acquired this pick as the result of a trade on July 22, 2022, that sent Oliver Bjorkstrand to Seattle in exchange for Winnipeg's fourth-round pick in 2023 and this pick. Seattle previously acquired this pick as the result of a trade on March 16, 2022, that sent Calle Jarnkrok to Calgary in exchange for Florida's second-round pick in 2022, a seventh-round pick in 2024 and this pick.)	Aydar Suniev	LW	Russia	Penticton Vees (BCHL)
4	112	Jaden Lipinski	C	United States	Vancouver Giants (WHL)
6	176	Yegor Yegorov	G	Russia	MHC Dynamo Moscow (MHL)
7	208	Axel Hurtig	D	Sweden	Rögle BK (J20 Nationell)
