= Max Willman =

American ice hockey player

- Born: February 13, 1995 (age 31) Barnstable, Massachusetts, U.S.
- Height: 6 ft 0 in (183 cm)
- Weight: 183 lb (83 kg; 13 st 1 lb)
- Position: Forward
- Shoots: Left
- team Former teams: Free agent Philadelphia Flyers; New Jersey Devils; Barys Astana
- NHL draft: 121st overall, 2014; Buffalo Sabres
- Playing career: 2021–present

Maxwell Willman (born February 13, 1995) is an American professional ice hockey forward who is currently an unrestricted free agent. He most recently played for Barys Astana of the Kontinental Hockey League (KHL). He previously played for the Philadelphia Flyers and New Jersey Devils of the National Hockey League (NHL). The Buffalo Sabres selected Willman in the fifth round, 121st overall, of the 2014 NHL entry draft.

== Early life ==
Willman was born on February 13, 1995, in Barnstable, Massachusetts, to Peyton and Timothy Willman. He began ice skating at the age of three, playing for minor ice hockey teams in Barnstable and Foxborough, Massachusetts before joining the varsity team at Barnstable High School. There, he had six total postseason appearances between ice hockey and lacrosse, led the ice hockey team in scoring for two seasons and served as captain during the 2012–13 season. Barnstable won 52 regular season games with Willman on their roster and took home three consecutive Old Colony League championship titles. When Willman received no NCAA Division I scholarship offers to play college ice hockey, Willman planned on abandoning ice hockey and attending Quinnipiac University as a non-athlete. He reconsidered after being noticed by the head coach of the ice hockey team at Williston Northampton School, a private college-preparatory school that participated in a number of ice hockey tournaments and showcases. He spent a postgraduate year there, serving as captain and as top-line center, while leading the team with 21 goals and 44 points.

== Playing career ==
=== Amateur ===
The Buffalo Sabres of the National Hockey League (NHL) selected Willman in the fifth round, 121st overall, of the 2014 NHL entry draft. At the time, he had already committed to playing college ice hockey for Brown University of the National Collegiate Athletic Association (NCAA). He scored his first NCAA goal in his first game, scoring in a 4–2 win over the United States Military Academy.

After setting career highs during the 2016–17 season with 11 goals and 26 points in 31 games, Willman only played nine games during his senior season in 2017–18, missing the final 21 games after suffering a knee injury. The injury gave Willman an additional season of NCAA eligibility, and so he enrolled in a graduate program at Boston University in order to play a year with the Boston University Terriers.

=== Professional ===
The Sabres opted not to sign Willman after his year at Boston University so he accepted an offer from the Reading Royals of the ECHL, a minor league affiliate of the Philadelphia Flyers. By the end of the 2019–20 season, he had moved up to the Lehigh Valley Phantoms of the American Hockey League (AHL), the top minor league in the NHL system. Willman made his NHL debut in the Flyers' 2021–22 season's home opener against the Vancouver Canucks on October 15, 2021, filling in for a roster that had been thinned out by travel protocols and injury. Willman scored his first NHL goal on December 10, in the second period of Philadelphia's 4–3 victory over the Vegas Golden Knights.

Having left the Flyers organization as a free agent following four seasons, Willman went unsigned in the off-season. Having accepted a professional tryout (PTO) contract to attend the pre-season training camp of the New Jersey Devils, Willman was subsequently signed to a one-year, two-way contract with the Devils on October 7, 2023, but was immediately put on waivers. He cleared waivers the next day and was assigned to begin the 2023–24 season with AHL affiliate, the Utica Comets. Willman was recalled to the Devils on November 4, and scored his first goal as a Devil the next day, in a 4–2 win over the Chicago Blackhawks.

On May 7, 2024, Willman as a pending free agent was signed to a one-year, two-way contract extension to remain with the New Jersey Devils.

== Career statistics ==
			Regular season					Playoffs
Season	Team	League	GP	G	A	Pts	PIM	GP	G	A	Pts	PIM
2014–15	Brown University	ECAC	30	1	2	3	12	—	—	—	—	—
2015–16	Brown University	ECAC	29	3	8	11	10	—	—	—	—	—
2016–17	Brown University	ECAC	31	11	15	26	10	—	—	—	—	—
2017–18	Brown University	ECAC	9	1	4	5	0	—	—	—	—	—
2018–19	Boston University	HE	36	1	5	6	24	—	—	—	—	—
2019–20	Reading Royals	ECHL	20	9	16	25	8	—	—	—	—	—
2019–20	Lehigh Valley Phantoms	AHL	24	3	6	9	18	—	—	—	—	—
2020–21	Lehigh Valley Phantoms	AHL	30	9	7	16	9	—	—	—	—	—
2021–22	Philadelphia Flyers	NHL	41	4	2	6	16	—	—	—	—	—
2021–22	Lehigh Valley Phantoms	AHL	34	11	8	19	33	—	—	—	—	—
2022–23	Lehigh Valley Phantoms	AHL	54	9	14	23	25	3	0	0	0	0
2022–23	Philadelphia Flyers	NHL	9	0	0	0	4	—	—	—	—	—
2023–24	Utica Comets	AHL	33	12	10	22	14	—	—	—	—	—
2023–24	New Jersey Devils	NHL	18	3	1	4	2	—	—	—	—	—
2024–25	Utica Comets	AHL	69	10	20	30	20	—	—	—	—	—
2025–26	Barys Astana	KHL	44	8	10	18	18	—	—	—	—	—
NHL totals			68	7	3	10	22	—	—	—	—	—
KHL totals			44	8	10	18	18	—	—	—	—	—
