= Nils Åman =

Swedish ice hockey player (born 2000)

- Born: 7 February 2000 (age 26) Avesta, Sweden
- Height: 6 ft 2 in (188 cm)
- Weight: 185 lb (84 kg; 13 st 3 lb)
- Position: Centre
- Shoots: Left
- SHL team Former teams: Djurgårdens IF; Leksands IF; Vancouver Canucks
- National team: Sweden
- NHL draft: 167th overall, 2020; Colorado Avalanche
- Playing career: 2018–present

Nils Åman (born 7 February 2000) is a Swedish professional ice hockey centre for Djurgårdens IF of the Swedish Hockey League (SHL). He was drafted by the Colorado Avalanche in the sixth round of the 2020 NHL entry draft with the 167th overall pick, though he never played for the organization. He has played in the National Hockey League (NHL) with the Vancouver Canucks.

== Early life ==
Åman is from the town of Skogsbo, near Avesta, Sweden. His youth club was Skogsbo SK until U14, after which he joined Avesta BK.

== Playing career ==
Åman joined Leksands IF's junior ranks on 29 March 2016. During his third season with Leksand, Åman was promoted from the J20 SuperElit and made his professional debut in the HockeyAllsvenskan, appearing in three games of the 2018–19 season. He made four further appearances in qualification, helping Leksand gain promotion to the Swedish Hockey League (SHL).

Åman continued his development in the following 2019–20 season, accounting for 47 points in 30 matches in J20. For six games, he was loaned to Karlskrona HK of the HockeyAllsvenskan. He returned to Leksand and played 8 games in the SHL, posting one goal and two assists for three points. He then signed a two-year men's team contract with Leksands IF on 19 March 2020.

Showing an offensive touch with a strong two-way game, Åman was selected in the sixth round, 167th overall, of the 2020 NHL entry draft by the Colorado Avalanche. In the following 2020–21 season, his first full year in the SHL, Åman made 51 appearances with Leksands IF as a depth forward, posting two goals and eight assists for 10 points. He recorded his first playoff goal in a first-round loss to Örebro HK.

On 23 December 2021, having increased his ice time and scoring totals, Åman was signed to a three-year contract extension to remain with Leksands IF until 2025. He completed the 2021–22 season having notched six goals and 8 assists for 14 points in 51 appearances.

With the Colorado Avalanche opting not to sign Åman before his draft rights expired on 1 June 2022, he was signed as a free agent to a two-year, entry-level contract with the Vancouver Canucks on 8 June 2022. After a successful training camp, Åman was announced to have made the Canucks 2022–23 season's opening night roster. Åman played 68 games for the Canucks in his first season, with 4 goals and 12 assists. He also played 17 games for the Abbotsford Canucks, the Vancouver Canucks' American Hockey League (AHL) affiliate. Åman stated that he thought the move to Abbotsford was beneficial for his development, as he was exposed to more offensive play and played more minutes.

As a pending restricted free agent following four seasons within the Canucks, Åman was not tendered a qualifying offer and was released as a free agent. On 21 July 2026, Åman opted to return to his native Sweden, resuming his career in the SHL by agreeing to a three-year contract with Djurgårdens IF.

== International play ==
Åman joined the Swedish national team, following the completion of the 2021–22 season, and following five friendly games was later selected to the preliminary squad to compete at the 2022 World Championship on 11 May 2022.

== Career statistics ==
=== Regular season and playoffs ===
			Regular season					Playoffs
Season	Team	League	GP	G	A	Pts	PIM	GP	G	A	Pts	PIM
2017–18	Leksands IF	J20	21	1	2	3	4	2	0	0	0	2
2018–19	Leksands IF	J20	45	14	27	41	14	2	1	0	1	0
2018–19	Leksands IF	Allsv	3	0	0	0	2	4	0	0	0	0
2018–19	Avesta BK	Div.2	1	0	0	0	0	—	—	—	—	—
2019–20	Leksands IF	J20	30	14	33	47	12	—	—	—	—	—
2019–20	Karlskrona HK	Allsv	6	1	0	1	0	—	—	—	—	—
2019–20	Leksands IF	SHL	8	1	2	3	0	—	—	—	—	—
2020–21	Leksands IF	SHL	51	2	8	10	10	4	1	0	1	4
2021–22	Leksands IF	SHL	51	6	8	14	8	3	0	0	0	2
2022–23	Vancouver Canucks	NHL	68	4	12	16	18	—	—	—	—	—
2022–23	Abbotsford Canucks	AHL	17	4	5	9	2	—	—	—	—	—
2023–24	Abbotsford Canucks	AHL	15	8	7	15	8	—	—	—	—	—
2023–24	Vancouver Canucks	NHL	43	3	4	7	8	5	0	0	0	0
2024–25	Vancouver Canucks	NHL	19	1	5	6	2	—	—	—	—	—
2024–25	Abbotsford Canucks	AHL	36	7	23	30	14	—	—	—	—	—
2025–26	Abbotsford Canucks	AHL	55	6	35	41	16	—	—	—	—	—
2025–26	Vancouver Canucks	NHL	2	0	0	0	0	—	—	—	—	—
SHL totals			110	9	18	27	18	7	1	0	1	2
NHL totals			132	8	21	29	28	5	0	0	0	0

=== International ===
Year	Team	Event	Result	GP	G	A	Pts	PIM
2022	Sweden	WC	6th	7	0	2	2	0
Senior totals				7	0	2	2	0
