= 2024 Stanley Cup playoffs =

NHL postseason tournament

Tournament details
- Dates: April 20 – June 24, 2024
- Teams: 16
- Defending champions: Vegas Golden Knights

Final positions
- Champions: Florida Panthers
- Runners-up: Edmonton Oilers

Tournament statistics
- Scoring leader(s): Connor McDavid (Oilers) (42 points)

Awards
- MVP: Connor McDavid (Oilers)

The 2024 Stanley Cup playoffs was the playoff tournament of the National Hockey League (NHL) for the 2023–24 season. The playoffs began on April 20, 2024, and concluded on June 24, 2024, with the Florida Panthers winning their first Stanley Cup in franchise history, defeating the Edmonton Oilers four games to three in the Stanley Cup Final.

The New York Rangers made the playoffs as the Presidents' Trophy winners with the most points (i.e. best record) during the regular season. Both the Boston Bruins and Toronto Maple Leafs extended their respective playoff streaks to eight consecutive seasons, the longest active streaks in the NHL. Additionally, this was the final season of the streak for Boston. For the second year in a row and third time since entering the NHL as expansion teams in the 1967–68 NHL season, both Pennsylvania-based teams (the Flyers and Penguins) missed the playoffs in the same season. Marc-Andre Fleury missed the playoffs for the first time since 2006.

For the fifth consecutive season and the eighth in the last ten seasons, a Florida-based team reached the conference finals/semifinals and reached the Stanley Cup Final for the fifth consecutive season. Aleksander Barkov became the first Finnish captain to win the Cup. For the first time since 2015, the New York Rangers became the only Presidents' Trophy winning team to hold this award twice and advance to the semifinal round of the playoffs in the last ten years. While the Oilers knocked off the division champion Canucks, this was the first time since 2018 that three of the four conference finalists – the Rangers, Panthers and Stars – were their respective division champions. During game four of the Stanley Cup Final, Connor McDavid set the playoff record for most assists in one year, eclipsing the previous record set by Wayne Gretzky in 1988. The Edmonton Oilers became the tenth team to tie a series after trailing 3–0 in a series and the third team to do so in the Stanley Cup Final.

== Playoff seeds ==
This was the ninth year in which the top three teams in each division made the playoffs, along with two wild cards in each conference (for a total of eight playoff teams from each conference).

The following teams qualified for the playoffs:

=== Eastern Conference ===
==== Atlantic Division ====
1. Florida Panthers, Atlantic Division champions – 110 points
2. Boston Bruins – 109 points
3. Toronto Maple Leafs – 102 points

==== Metropolitan Division ====
1. New York Rangers, Metropolitan Division champions, Eastern Conference regular season champions, Presidents' Trophy winners – 114 points
2. Carolina Hurricanes – 111 points
3. New York Islanders – 94 points

==== Wild Cards ====
1. Tampa Bay Lightning – 98 points
2. Washington Capitals – 91 points

=== Western Conference ===
==== Central Division ====
1. Dallas Stars, Central Division champions, Western Conference regular season champions – 113 points
2. Winnipeg Jets – 110 points
3. Colorado Avalanche – 107 points

==== Pacific Division ====
1. Vancouver Canucks, Pacific Division champions – 109 points
2. Edmonton Oilers – 104 points
3. Los Angeles Kings – 99 points

==== Wild Cards ====
1. Nashville Predators – 99 points
2. Vegas Golden Knights – 98 points

== Playoff bracket ==
In each round, teams competed in a best-of-seven series following a 2–2–1–1–1 format (scores in the bracket indicate the number of games won in each best-of-seven series). The team with home ice advantage played at home for games one and two (and games five and seven, if necessary), and the other team played at home for games three and four (and game six, if necessary). The top three teams in each division made the playoffs, along with two wild cards in each conference, for a total of eight teams from each conference.

In the first round, the lower seeded wild card in the conference played against the division winner with the best record while the other wild card played against the other division winner, and both wild cards were de facto #4 seeds. The other series matched the second and third-place teams from the divisions. In the first two rounds, home-ice advantage was awarded to the team with the better seed. Thereafter, it was awarded to the team that had the better regular season record.

First round	Second round
A1	Florida	4
WC1	Tampa Bay	1
A1	Florida	4
A2	Boston	2
A2	Boston	4
A3	Toronto	3
Eastern Conference
M1	NY Rangers	4
WC2	Washington	0
M1	NY Rangers	4
M2	Carolina	2
M2	Carolina	4
M3	NY Islanders	1
C1	Dallas	4
WC2	Vegas	3
C1	Dallas	4
C3	Colorado	2
C2	Winnipeg	1
C3	Colorado	4
Western Conference
P1	Vancouver	4
WC1	Nashville	2
P1	Vancouver	3
P2	Edmonton	4
P2	Edmonton	4
P3	Los Angeles	1

Conference finals
A1	Florida	4
M1	NY Rangers	2
C1	Dallas	2
P2	Edmonton	4

Stanley Cup Final
A1	Florida	4
P2	Edmonton	3

Legend

- A1, A2, A3 – The first, second, and third place teams from the Atlantic Division, respectively
- M1, M2, M3 – The first, second, and third place teams from the Metropolitan Division, respectively
- C1, C2, C3 – The first, second, and third place teams from the Central Division, respectively
- P1, P2, P3 – The first, second, and third place teams from the Pacific Division, respectively
- WC1, WC2 – The first and second place teams in the Wild Card, respectively

== First round ==
=== Eastern Conference first round ===
==== (A1) Florida Panthers vs. (WC1) Tampa Bay Lightning ====
The Florida Panthers finished first in the Atlantic Division earning 110 points. The Tampa Bay Lightning finished as the Eastern Conference's first wild card earning 98 points. This was the third playoff meeting between these two rivals with Tampa Bay winning both previous series. They last met in the 2022 Eastern Conference second round, which Tampa Bay won in a four-game sweep. Florida won two of the three games in the regular season series.

The Panthers defeated the Lightning in five games. Aleksander Barkov assisted twice for the Panthers in game one, emerging victorious for a 3–2 score. In game two, Carter Verhaeghe scored the overtime game-winning goal for the Panthers, providing a 3–2 victory for Florida and a 2–0 series lead. Matthew Tkachuk scored twice for the Panthers in game three, pushing the series to a 3–0 series lead with a 5–3 win. In game four, Steven Stamkos and Brandon Hagel both scored twice for Tampa Bay to prevent a series sweep by Florida, defeating the Panthers 6–3 to force game five. However, Barkov and Verhaeghe both scored twice and provided an assist for the Panthers in the subsequent game five, routing the Lightning 6–1 to advance to the second round.

April 21	Tampa Bay Lightning	2–3	Florida Panthers	Amerant Bank Arena	Recap
Brandon Hagel (1) – 16:04		First period	06:17 – Sam Reinhart (1)
No scoring		Second period	No scoring
Steven Stamkos (1) – pp – 19:50		Third period	00:58 – pp – Carter Verhaeghe (1); 17:55 – en – Matthew Tkachuk (1)
Andrei Vasilevskiy 25 saves / 27 shots		Goalie stats	Sergei Bobrovsky 17 saves / 19 shots

April 23	Tampa Bay Lightning	2–3	OT	Florida Panthers	Amerant Bank Arena	Recap
No scoring		First period		06:16 – Sam Bennett (1); 15:12 – pp – Vladimir Tarasenko (1)
Brayden Point (1) – 00:48; Steven Stamkos (2) – pp – 05:46		Second period		No scoring
No scoring		Third period		No scoring
No scoring		First overtime period		02:59 – Carter Verhaeghe (2)
Andrei Vasilevskiy 34 saves / 37 shots		Goalie stats		Sergei Bobrovsky 21 saves / 23 shots

April 25	Florida Panthers	5–3	Tampa Bay Lightning	Amalie Arena	Recap
Matthew Tkachuk (2) – 10:39		First period	No scoring
Sam Reinhart (2) – 09:58; Brandon Montour (1) – 16:30		Second period	00:44 – Steven Stamkos (3); 02:56 – Tyler Motte (1)
Steven Lorentz (1) – 09:41; Matthew Tkachuk (3) – en – 19:28		Third period	14:50 – Nick Paul (1)
Sergei Bobrovsky 26 saves / 29 shots		Goalie stats	Andrei Vasilevskiy 26 saves / 30 shots

April 27	Florida Panthers	3–6	Tampa Bay Lightning	Amalie Arena	Recap
No scoring		First period	08:54 – pp – Steven Stamkos (4); 12:09 – sh – Brandon Hagel (2); 15:07 – Brayden Point (2)
Carter Verhaeghe (3) – 04:17; Sam Reinhart (3) – 11:09; Oliver Ekman-Larsson (1) – 14:33		Second period	09:40 – Brandon Hagel (3)
No scoring		Third period	09:34 – Steven Stamkos (5); 16:22 – pp – Nick Paul (2)
Sergei Bobrovsky 26 saves / 32 shots		Goalie stats	Andrei Vasilevskiy 22 saves / 25 shots

April 29	Tampa Bay Lightning	1–6	Florida Panthers	Amerant Bank Arena	Recap
No scoring		First period	No scoring
Victor Hedman (1) – 13:37		Second period	00:45 – Carter Verhaeghe (4); 12:38 – sh – Aleksander Barkov (1)
No scoring		Third period	11:06 – Aleksander Barkov (2); 14:16 – Evan Rodrigues (1); 16:03 – en – Carter Verhaeghe (5); 18:50 – en – Niko Mikkola (1)
Andrei Vasilevskiy 33 saves / 37 shots		Goalie stats	Sergei Bobrovsky 31 saves / 32 shots

Florida won series 4–1

==== (A2) Boston Bruins vs. (A3) Toronto Maple Leafs ====
The Boston Bruins finished second in the Atlantic Division earning 109 points. The Toronto Maple Leafs earned 102 points to finish third in the Atlantic. This was the seventeenth playoff meeting between these two rivals with both teams splitting the sixteen previous series, but with Boston winning the past six playoff series. They last met in the 2019 Eastern Conference first round, which Boston won in seven games. Boston won all four games in the regular season series.

The Bruins defeated the Maple Leafs in seven games after leading the series 3–1. In game one, Jake DeBrusk scored twice and goaltender Jeremy Swayman made 35 saves to backstop the Bruins to a 5–1 victory. Max Domi scored a goal and provided an assist for the Maple Leafs in game two to tie the series with a 3–2 victory. Brad Marchand scored twice and provided an assist for the Bruins in game three, emerging victorious over the Maple Leafs 4–2. Marchand continued his goal-scoring and assisting in game four, providing one of each in Boston's 3–1 victory to take a 3–1 series lead. Game five required overtime, wherein Toronto forward Matthew Knies scored to give the Maple Leafs a 2–1 victory, extending the series to a sixth game. In game six, William Nylander scored twice for the Maple Leafs, forcing a seventh game with a 2–1 victory. David Pastrnak scored the overtime-winning goal at 1:54 for the Bruins in game seven, preventing a 3–1 series comeback from the Maple Leafs with a 2–1 victory. With the loss, Toronto extended their game seven-losing streak to six games, with four against Boston; in addition Toronto lost their seventh consecutive playoff series against Boston.

April 20	Toronto Maple Leafs	1–5	Boston Bruins	TD Garden	Recap
No scoring		First period	02:26 – John Beecher (1)
No scoring		Second period	05:47 – Brandon Carlo (1); 15:02 – pp – Jake DeBrusk (1); 17:34 – pp – Jake DeBrusk (2)
David Kampf (1) – 01:39		Third period	17:52 – en – Trent Frederic (1)
Ilya Samsonov 20 saves / 24 shots		Goalie stats	Jeremy Swayman 35 saves / 36 shots

April 22	Toronto Maple Leafs	3–2	Boston Bruins	TD Garden	Recap
Max Domi (1) – 10:32		First period	10:18 – pp – Morgan Geekie (1); 19:52 – David Pastrnak (1)
John Tavares (1) – pp – 18:26		Second period	No scoring
Auston Matthews (1) – 12:06		Third period	No scoring
Ilya Samsonov 27 saves / 29 shots		Goalie stats	Linus Ullmark 31 saves / 34 shots

April 24	Boston Bruins	4–2	Toronto Maple Leafs	Scotiabank Arena	Recap
No scoring		First period	No scoring
Trent Frederic (2) – 17:37		Second period	13:10 – Matthew Knies (1)
Jake DeBrusk (3) – pp – 01:07; Brad Marchand (1) – 11:53; Brad Marchand (2) – pp-en – 19:24		Third period	11:25 – Tyler Bertuzzi (1)
Jeremy Swayman 28 saves / 30 shots		Goalie stats	Ilya Samsonov 30 saves / 33 shots

April 27	Boston Bruins	3–1	Toronto Maple Leafs	Scotiabank Arena	Recap
James van Riemsdyk (1) – 15:09		First period	No scoring
Brad Marchand (3) – pp – 08:20; David Pastrnak (2) – 19:18		Second period	No scoring
No scoring		Third period	05:43 – Mitch Marner (1)
Jeremy Swayman 24 saves / 25 shots		Goalie stats	Ilya Samsonov 14 saves / 17 shots Joseph Woll 5 saves / 5 shots

April 30	Toronto Maple Leafs	2–1	OT	Boston Bruins	TD Garden	Recap
Jake McCabe (1) – 05:33		First period		13:54 – Trent Frederic (3)
No scoring		Second period		No scoring
No scoring		Third period		No scoring
Matthew Knies (2) – 02:26		First overtime period		No scoring
Joseph Woll 27 saves / 28 shots		Goalie stats		Jeremy Swayman 31 saves / 33 shots

May 2	Boston Bruins	1–2	Toronto Maple Leafs	Scotiabank Arena	Recap
No scoring		First period	No scoring
No scoring		Second period	19:05 – William Nylander (1)
Morgan Geekie (2) – 19:59		Third period	17:47 – William Nylander (2)
Jeremy Swayman 24 saves / 26 shots		Goalie stats	Joseph Woll 22 saves / 23 shots

May 4	Toronto Maple Leafs	1–2	OT	Boston Bruins	TD Garden	Recap
No scoring		First period		No scoring
No scoring		Second period		No scoring
William Nylander (3) – 09:01		Third period		10:22 – Hampus Lindholm (1)
No scoring		First overtime period		01:54 – David Pastrnak (3)
Ilya Samsonov 30 saves / 32 shots		Goalie stats		Jeremy Swayman 30 saves / 31 shots

Boston won series 4–3

==== (M1) New York Rangers vs. (WC2) Washington Capitals ====
The New York Rangers earned the Presidents' Trophy as the NHL's best regular season team with 114 points. Washington finished as the Eastern Conference's second wild card earning 91 points, winning the tiebreaker against Detroit with 32 RWs. This was the tenth playoff meeting between these two rivals with New York winning five of the nine previous series. They last met in the 2015 Eastern Conference second round, which New York came back from a 3–1 series deficit to win in seven games. These teams split their four-game regular season series.

The Rangers defeated the Capitals in a four-game sweep. The Rangers scored three goals in the span of 2:06 in the second period of game one en route to a 4–1 victory. In game two, Vincent Trocheck and Mika Zibanejad each scored a goal and provided an assist for the Rangers, skating away with a 4–3 victory. Igor Shesterkin made 29 saves for the Rangers in game three, leading New York to a 3–1 victory and a 3–0 series lead. In game four, Artemi Panarin scored a goal and provided an assist to the Rangers' 4–2 victory, completing the four-game sweep. It was the first sweep for the Rangers since 2007, and they became the sixth Presidents' Trophy-winning team to sweep their opening-round series.

April 21	Washington Capitals	1–4	New York Rangers	Madison Square Garden	Recap
No scoring		First period	No scoring
Martin Fehervary (1) – 07:31		Second period	04:17 – Matt Rempe (1); 04:50 – Artemi Panarin (1); 06:23 – Jimmy Vesey (1)
No scoring		Third period	16:17 – Chris Kreider (1)
Charlie Lindgren 27 saves / 31 shots		Goalie stats	Igor Shesterkin 20 saves / 21 shots

April 23	Washington Capitals	3–4	New York Rangers	Madison Square Garden	Recap
Connor McMichael (1) – 05:09		First period	07:56 – Vincent Trocheck (1); 14:28 – pp – Mika Zibanejad (1)
Dylan Strome (1) – pp – 04:14		Second period	12:26 – pp – Jack Roslovic (1); 16:52 – sh – K'Andre Miller (1)
Tom Wilson (1) – pp – 11:45		Third period	No scoring
Charlie Lindgren 24 saves / 28 shots		Goalie stats	Igor Shesterkin 22 saves / 25 shots

April 26	New York Rangers	3–1	Washington Capitals	Capital One Arena	Recap
Chris Kreider (2) – 06:08; Barclay Goodrow (1) – sh – 08:08		First period	05:34 – John Carlson (1)
Vincent Trocheck (2) – pp – 15:22		Second period	No scoring
No scoring		Third period	No scoring
Igor Shesterkin 29 saves / 30 shots		Goalie stats	Charlie Lindgren 19 saves / 22 shots

April 28	New York Rangers	4–2	Washington Capitals	Capital One Arena	Recap
Kaapo Kakko (1) – 00:57; Vincent Trocheck (3) – pp – 19:44		First period	14:54 – Martin Fehervary (2)
No scoring		Second period	07:48 – Hendrix Lapierre (1)
Artemi Panarin (2) – pp – 03:21; Jack Roslovic (2) – pp-en – 19:09		Third period	No scoring
Igor Shesterkin 23 saves / 25 shots		Goalie stats	Charlie Lindgren 19 saves / 22 shots

New York won series 4–0

==== (M2) Carolina Hurricanes vs. (M3) New York Islanders ====
The Carolina Hurricanes finished second in the Metropolitan Division earning 111 points. The New York Islanders earned 94 points to finish third in the Metropolitan. This was the second consecutive and third overall playoff meeting between these two teams with Carolina winning both previous series. Carolina won the previous year's Eastern Conference first round in six games. These teams split their four-game regular season series.

The Hurricanes defeated the Islanders in five games. Goaltender Frederik Andersen made 33 saves for the Hurricanes in game one, triumphing over the Islanders 3–1. Down 3–0 in game two, the Hurricanes scored twice in nine seconds with 2:15 left in the game to rally and take the lead to emerge victorious 5–3. In game three, the Hurricanes forced the Islanders to switch out goaltenders after potting three goals on fourteen shots in a 3–2 victory for a 3–0 series lead. Game four went to double-overtime, during which forward Mathew Barzal scored his second of the game for the Islanders, forcing a fifth game with a 3–2 victory. In game five, the Hurricanes scored twice in eight seconds to take a 5–3 lead in the third period, adding an insurance goal to advance to the second round with a 6–3 victory.

April 20	New York Islanders	1–3	Carolina Hurricanes	PNC Arena	Recap
Kyle MacLean (1) – 08:20		First period	01:35 – pp – Evgeny Kuznetsov (1)
No scoring		Second period	No scoring
No scoring		Third period	03:44 – Stefan Noesen (1); 18:28 – en – Martin Necas (1)
Semyon Varlamov 23 saves / 25 shots		Goalie stats	Frederik Andersen 33 saves / 34 shots

April 22	New York Islanders	3–5	Carolina Hurricanes	PNC Arena	Recap
Kyle Palmieri (1) – 16:22; Bo Horvat (1) – 19:45		First period	No scoring
Anders Lee (1) – pp – 03:54		Second period	13:01 – pp – Teuvo Teravainen (1)
No scoring		Third period	10:43 – Seth Jarvis (1); 17:45 – Sebastian Aho (1); 17:54 – Jordan Martinook (1); 19:04 – en – Jake Guentzel (1)
Semyon Varlamov 34 saves / 38 shots		Goalie stats	Frederik Andersen 9 saves / 12 shots

April 25	Carolina Hurricanes	3–2	New York Islanders	UBS Arena	Recap
Brent Burns (1) – 04:46; Dmitry Orlov (1) – 10:25		First period	No scoring
Sebastian Aho (2) – 07:14		Second period	02:48 – Pierre Engvall (1); 17:39 – Brock Nelson (1)
No scoring		Third period	No scoring
Frederik Andersen 29 saves / 31 shots		Goalie stats	Ilya Sorokin 11 saves / 14 shots Semyon Varlamov 8 saves / 8 shots

April 27	Carolina Hurricanes	2–3	2OT	New York Islanders	UBS Arena	Recap
Seth Jarvis (2) – pp – 08:00		First period		No scoring
No scoring		Second period		10:10 – Mathew Barzal (1)
Stefan Noesen (2) – pp – 14:08		Third period		01:38 – pp – Jean-Gabriel Pageau (1)
No scoring		Second overtime period		01:24 – Mathew Barzal (2)
Frederik Andersen 32 saves / 35 shots		Goalie stats		Semyon Varlamov 42 saves / 44 shots

April 30	New York Islanders	3–6	Carolina Hurricanes	PNC Arena	Recap
Mike Reilly (1) – pp – 03:54		First period	01:23 – Teuvo Teravainen (2); 03:13 – pp – Andrei Svechnikov (1); 13:22 – ps – Evgeny Kuznetsov (2)
Brock Nelson (2) – 03:47; Casey Cizikas (1) – 19:38		Second period	No scoring
No scoring		Third period	04:36 – Jack Drury (1); 04:44 – Stefan Noesen (3); 18:21 – en – Seth Jarvis (3)
Semyon Varlamov 32 saves / 37 shots		Goalie stats	Frederik Andersen 21 saves / 24 shots

Carolina won series 4–1

=== Western Conference first round ===
==== (C1) Dallas Stars vs. (WC2) Vegas Golden Knights ====
The Dallas Stars finished first in the Central Division and Western Conference earning 113 points. The Vegas Golden Knights earned 98 points to finish as the Western Conference's second wild card. This was the second consecutive and third overall playoff series between these two teams with both teams splitting the previous two series. Vegas won the previous year's Western Conference final in six games. Vegas won all three games in the regular season series.

The Stars defeated the Golden Knights in seven games. Defenceman Brayden McNabb potted a goal and an assist for the Golden Knights in game one who triumphed over the Stars 4–3. In game two, Jonathan Marchessault and Jack Eichel each scored a goal and provided an assist to the Golden Knights' 3–1 victory. Dallas forward Wyatt Johnston scored twice in game three, including the overtime-winning goal with 3:37 remaining, granting the Stars a 3–2 victory. In game four, Jake Oettinger made 32 saves for the Stars, defeating the Golden Knights 4–2 and tying the series 2–2. Johnston assisted twice for the Stars in game five, granting Dallas a 3–2 victory and a 3–2 series lead. In game six, Adin Hill stopped all 23 shots he faced for the Golden Knights, defeating the Stars 2–0 to force a seventh game. In game seven, Oettinger made 22 saves for the Stars and Radek Faksa provided the game-winning goal to send the Stars to the second round with a 2–1 victory.

April 22	Vegas Golden Knights	4–3	Dallas Stars	American Airlines Center	Recap
Mark Stone (1) – pp – 01:23; Jonathan Marchessault (1) – 08:27; Tomas Hertl (1) – pp – 17:51		First period	16:07 – Jamie Benn (1); 18:29 – Jason Robertson (1)
Brayden McNabb (1) – 01:06		Second period	No scoring
No scoring		Third period	11:46 – Mason Marchment (1)
Logan Thompson 26 saves / 29 shots		Goalie stats	Jake Oettinger 11 saves / 15 shots

April 24	Vegas Golden Knights	3–1	Dallas Stars	American Airlines Center	Recap
Jonathan Marchessault (2) – 18:09		First period	16:47 – pp – Jason Robertson (2)
Noah Hanifin (1) – 18:53		Second period	No scoring
Jack Eichel (1) – en – 19:26		Third period	No scoring
Logan Thompson 20 saves / 21 shots		Goalie stats	Jake Oettinger 23 saves / 25 shots

April 27	Dallas Stars	3–2	OT	Vegas Golden Knights	T-Mobile Arena	Recap
Wyatt Johnston (1) – 11:11		First period		No scoring
Miro Heiskanen (1) – 05:25		Second period		10:40 – Brayden McNabb (2); 13:50 – sh – Jack Eichel (2)
No scoring		Third period		No scoring
Wyatt Johnston (2) – 16:23		First overtime period		No scoring
Jake Oettinger 32 saves / 34 shots		Goalie stats		Logan Thompson 43 saves / 46 shots

April 29	Dallas Stars	4–2	Vegas Golden Knights	T-Mobile Arena	Recap
Evgenii Dadonov (1) – 17:52		First period	14:25 – Michael Amadio (1)
Wyatt Johnston (3) – pp – 09:45; Ty Dellandrea (1) – 18:34		Second period	03:09 – Jack Eichel (3)
Roope Hintz (1) – en – 18:38		Third period	No scoring
Jake Oettinger 32 saves / 34 shots		Goalie stats	Logan Thompson 28 saves / 31 shots

May 1	Vegas Golden Knights	2–3	Dallas Stars	American Airlines Center	Recap
Mark Stone (2) – pp – 04:00; William Carrier (1) – 12:51		First period	05:02 – Evgenii Dadonov (2); 08:04 – pp – Matt Duchene (1)
No scoring		Second period	16:32 – pp – Jason Robertson (3)
No scoring		Third period	No scoring
Adin Hill 22 saves / 25 shots		Goalie stats	Jake Oettinger 25 saves / 27 shots

May 3	Dallas Stars	0–2	Vegas Golden Knights	T-Mobile Arena	Recap
No scoring		First period	No scoring
No scoring		Second period	No scoring
No scoring		Third period	09:54 – Noah Hanifin (2); 19:41 – en – Mark Stone (3)
Jake Oettinger 28 saves / 29 shots		Goalie stats	Adin Hill 23 saves / 23 shots

May 5	Vegas Golden Knights	1–2	Dallas Stars	American Airlines Center	Recap
No scoring		First period	14:34 – Wyatt Johnston (4)
Brett Howden (1) – 15:25		Second period	No scoring
No scoring		Third period	00:44 – Radek Faksa (1)
Adin Hill 22 saves / 24 shots		Goalie stats	Jake Oettinger 22 saves / 23 shots

Dallas won series 4–3

==== (C2) Winnipeg Jets vs. (C3) Colorado Avalanche ====
The Winnipeg Jets finished second in the Central Division earning 110 points. The Colorado Avalanche earned 107 points to finish third in the Central. This was the first playoff meeting between these two teams. Winnipeg won all three games in the regular season series.

The Avalanche defeated the Jets in five games. In game one, Kyle Connor and Adam Lowry each scored twice for the Jets, triumphing over the Avalanche 7–6. Goaltender Alexandar Georgiev bounced back in game two for the Avalanche, making 28 saves in a 5–2 victory. Colorado was granted a five-goal third period, ensuring a 6–2 victory in game three for the Avalanche. Valeri Nichushkin scored a hat-trick in game four for the Avalanche, snatching a 5–1 triumph with a 3–1 series lead. In game five, Mikko Rantanen scored twice and provided an assist for the Avalanche, defeating the Jets 6–3 to advance to the second round.

April 21	Colorado Avalanche	6–7	Winnipeg Jets	Canada Life Centre	Recap
Valeri Nichushkin (1) – 06:10; Miles Wood (1) – 14:47; Nathan MacKinnon (1) – 15:05		First period	08:02 – Josh Morrissey (1); 11:57 – Vladislav Namestnikov (1); 15:53 – Mark Scheifele (1)
No scoring		Second period	08:57 – Adam Lowry (1)
Artturi Lehkonen (1) – pp – 06:29; Cale Makar (1) – pp – 12:24; Casey Mittelstadt (1) – 19:30		Third period	03:31 – Adam Lowry (2); 05:51 – pp – Kyle Connor (1); 08:54 – Kyle Connor (2)
Alexandar Georgiev 16 saves / 23 shots		Goalie stats	Connor Hellebuyck 40 saves / 46 shots

April 23	Colorado Avalanche	5–2	Winnipeg Jets	Canada Life Centre	Recap
No scoring		First period	03:15 – David Gustafsson (1)
Miles Wood (2) – 01:59; Artturi Lehkonen (2) – 14:16; Zach Parise (1) – 17:20; Josh Manson (1) – 19:53		Second period	08:37 – Mark Scheifele (2)
Valeri Nichushkin (2) – en – 19:03		Third period	No scoring
Alexandar Georgiev 28 saves / 30 shots		Goalie stats	Connor Hellebuyck 27 saves / 31 shots

April 26	Winnipeg Jets	2–6	Colorado Avalanche	Ball Arena	Recap
No scoring		First period	11:18 – Zach Parise (2)
Tyler Toffoli (1) – 05:03; Josh Morrissey (2) – pp – 10:50		Second period	No scoring
No scoring		Third period	02:11 – pp – Nathan MacKinnon (2); 04:39 – pp – Valeri Nichushkin (3); 08:11 – Artturi Lehkonen (3); 12:35 – Ross Colton (1); 16:25 – sh-en – Devon Toews (1)
Connor Hellebuyck 34 saves / 39 shots		Goalie stats	Alexandar Georgiev 22 saves / 24 shots

April 28	Winnipeg Jets	1–5	Colorado Avalanche	Ball Arena	Recap
Nate Schmidt (1) – 13:56		First period	08:10 – Artturi Lehkonen (4)
No scoring		Second period	11:36 – pp – Valeri Nichushkin (4); 15:03 – Cale Makar (2); 19:36 – pp – Valeri Nichushkin (5)
No scoring		Third period	19:47 – en – Valeri Nichushkin (6)
Connor Hellebuyck 26 saves / 30 shots Laurent Brossoit 4 saves / 4 shots		Goalie stats	Alexandar Georgiev 26 saves / 27 shots

April 30	Colorado Avalanche	6–3	Winnipeg Jets	Canada Life Centre	Recap
Valeri Nichushkin (7) – 03:18		First period	01:15 – Kyle Connor (3)
Yakov Trenin (1) – 05:42; Artturi Lehkonen (5) – 13:45		Second period	06:48 – pp – Josh Morrissey (3)
Mikko Rantanen (1) – 04:11; Mikko Rantanen (2) – 08:01; Josh Manson (2) – en – 19:58		Third period	02:06 – Tyler Toffoli (2)
Alexandar Georgiev 33 saves / 36 shots		Goalie stats	Connor Hellebuyck 26 saves / 31 shots

Colorado won series 4–1

==== (P1) Vancouver Canucks vs. (WC1) Nashville Predators ====
The Vancouver Canucks finished first in the Pacific Division earning 109 points. The Nashville Predators earned 99 points to finish as the first wild card in the Western Conference. This was the second playoff meeting between these two teams. Their only previous meeting was in the 2011 Western Conference semifinals, which Vancouver won in six games. Vancouver won all three games in the regular season series.

The Canucks defeated the Predators in six games. In game one, Dakota Joshua scored twice and added an assist for the Canucks, defeating the Predators 4–2. Filip Forsberg scored a goal and provided an assist for the Predators in game two, tying the series with a 4–1 victory. In game three, goaltender Casey DeSmith made 29 saves for the Canucks, defeating the Predators 2–1. Down 3–1 with under 3 minutes to go left in the game, Brock Boeser scored with 2:47 left to make it 3-2. Colton Sissons hit the post on an empty net with 1:50 left. Boeser then put home a rebound with 6.2 seconds to go to finish the hat-trick and tie the game at 3-3. Elias Lindholm scored 1:02 into overtime for Vancouver to cap off the rally and give the Canucks a 3–1 series lead. In game five, Forsberg assisted on both Nashville goals as the Predators forced a sixth game with a 2–1 victory. Pius Suter scored the only goal of game six with 1:39 left in the game, and with Arturs Silovs' 28 saves, Vancouver moved onto the second round with a 1–0 victory.

April 21	Nashville Predators	2–4	Vancouver Canucks	Rogers Arena	Recap
Jason Zucker (1) – 16:15		First period	No scoring
Ryan O'Reilly (1) – pp – 10:46		Second period	00:47 – Elias Lindholm (1)
No scoring		Third period	08:59 – Pius Suter (1); 09:11 – Dakota Joshua (1); 18:32 – en – Dakota Joshua (2)
Juuse Saros 17 saves / 20 shots		Goalie stats	Thatcher Demko 22 saves / 24 shots

April 23	Nashville Predators	4–1	Vancouver Canucks	Rogers Arena	Recap
Anthony Beauvillier (1) – 01:14		First period	No scoring
Filip Forsberg (1) – 06:29; Colton Sissons (1) – 08:04		Second period	15:33 – Nikita Zadorov (1)
Kiefer Sherwood (1) – en – 18:07		Third period	No scoring
Juuse Saros 17 saves / 18 shots		Goalie stats	Casey DeSmith 12 saves / 15 shots

April 26	Vancouver Canucks	2–1	Nashville Predators	Bridgestone Arena	Recap
J. T. Miller (1) – pp – 13:23		First period	No scoring
Brock Boeser (1) – pp – 04:33		Second period	No scoring
No scoring		Third period	16:48 – Luke Evangelista (1)
Casey DeSmith 29 saves / 30 shots		Goalie stats	Juuse Saros 10 saves / 12 shots

April 28	Vancouver Canucks	4–3	OT	Nashville Predators	Bridgestone Arena	Recap
Brock Boeser (2) – 02:55		First period		05:34 – Mark Jankowski (1)
No scoring		Second period		05:21 – Gustav Nyquist (1)
Brock Boeser (3) – 17:11; Brock Boeser (4) – 19:52		Third period		00:12 – Filip Forsberg (2)
Elias Lindholm (2) – 01:02		First overtime period		No scoring
Arturs Silovs 27 saves / 30 shots		Goalie stats		Juuse Saros 17 saves / 21 shots

April 30	Nashville Predators	2–1	Vancouver Canucks	Rogers Arena	Recap
No scoring		First period	No scoring
No scoring		Second period	No scoring
Roman Josi (1) – pp – 07:15; Alexandre Carrier (1) – 12:46		Third period	03:11 – Nikita Zadorov (2)
Juuse Saros 19 saves / 20 shots		Goalie stats	Arturs Silovs 20 saves / 22 shots

May 3	Vancouver Canucks	1–0	Nashville Predators	Bridgestone Arena	Recap
No scoring		First period	No scoring
No scoring		Second period	No scoring
Pius Suter (2) – 18:21		Third period	No scoring
Arturs Silovs 28 saves / 28 shots		Goalie stats	Juuse Saros 28 saves / 29 shots

Vancouver won series 4–2

==== (P2) Edmonton Oilers vs. (P3) Los Angeles Kings ====
The Edmonton Oilers finished second in the Pacific Division earning 104 points. The Los Angeles Kings finished third in the Pacific with 99 points. This was the third consecutive and tenth overall playoff meeting between these two rivals with Edmonton winning seven of the nine previous series. Edmonton won the previous year's Western Conference first round series in six games. Edmonton won three of the four games in the regular season series.

The Oilers defeated the Kings in five games. In game one, Zach Hyman scored a hat-trick and Connor McDavid provided five assists to hold off the Kings for a 7–4 victory. Anze Kopitar scored the overtime goal and provided two assists for the Kings in game two, tying the series with a 5–4 win. The Oilers routed the Kings in game three with Hyman and Leon Draisaitl both scoring twice in Edmonton's 6–1 victory. In game four, Evan Bouchard scored the only goal and goaltender Stuart Skinner stopped all 33 shots he faced to give the Oilers a 1–0 victory and a 3–1 series lead. McDavid and Bouchard each assisted thrice in game five, sending the Oilers to the second round with a 4–3 victory.

April 22	Los Angeles Kings	4–7	Edmonton Oilers	Rogers Place	Recap
No scoring		First period	06:52 – Zach Hyman (1); 09:36 – Adam Henrique (1)
Mikey Anderson (1) – 10:56; Adrian Kempe (1) – 17:56		Second period	04:50 – Zach Hyman (2); 08:24 – pp – Ryan Nugent-Hopkins (1)
Pierre-Luc Dubois (1) – 16:56; Trevor Moore (1) – 18:49		Third period	01:08 – pp – Leon Draisaitl (1); 06:17 – pp – Zach Hyman (3); 19:34 – en – Warren Foegele (1)
Cam Talbot 38 saves / 44 shots		Goalie stats	Stuart Skinner 33 saves / 37 shots

April 24	Los Angeles Kings	5–4	OT	Edmonton Oilers	Rogers Place	Recap
Adrian Kempe (2) – 03:19; Adrian Kempe (3) – 14:57; Drew Doughty (1) – 18:02		First period		17:33 – Brett Kulak (1)
No scoring		Second period		07:51 – Dylan Holloway (1); 10:33 – pp – Zach Hyman (4)
Kevin Fiala (1) – 01:46		Third period		03:23 – Dylan Holloway (2)
Anze Kopitar (1) – 02:07		First overtime period		No scoring
Cam Talbot 27 saves / 31 shots		Goalie stats		Stuart Skinner 21 saves / 26 shots

April 26	Edmonton Oilers	6–1	Los Angeles Kings	Crypto.com Arena	Recap
Zach Hyman (5) – 06:42; Leon Draisaitl (2) – 15:36; Connor McDavid (1) – pp – 18:34		First period	No scoring
Evander Kane (1) – 07:39		Second period	05:32 – Drew Doughty (2)
Zach Hyman (6) – pp – 06:37; Leon Draisaitl (3) – pp – 12:38		Third period	No scoring
Stuart Skinner 27 saves / 28 shots		Goalie stats	Cam Talbot 34 saves / 40 shots

April 28	Edmonton Oilers	1–0	Los Angeles Kings	Crypto.com Arena	Recap
No scoring		First period	No scoring
Evan Bouchard (1) – pp – 11:49		Second period	No scoring
No scoring		Third period	No scoring
Stuart Skinner 33 saves / 33 shots		Goalie stats	David Rittich 12 saves / 13 shots

May 1	Los Angeles Kings	3–4	Edmonton Oilers	Rogers Place	Recap
Alex Laferriere (1) – 19:32		First period	10:17 – Evander Kane (2)
Blake Lizotte (1) – 03:08		Second period	07:44 – pp – Leon Draisaitl (4); 12:21 – Leon Draisaitl (5); 19:07 – Zach Hyman (7)
Adrian Kempe (4) – 17:42		Third period	No scoring
David Rittich 22 saves / 26 shots		Goalie stats	Stuart Skinner 18 saves / 21 shots

Edmonton won series 4–1

== Second round ==
=== Eastern Conference second round ===
==== (A1) Florida Panthers vs. (A2) Boston Bruins ====
This was the second consecutive and third overall playoff meeting between these two teams with Florida winning both previous series. Florida won the previous year's Eastern Conference first round which they won by coming back from a 3–1 series deficit to win in seven games. Boston won all four games in the regular season series.

The Panthers defeated the Bruins in six games. Jeremy Swayman made 38 saves for the Bruins in game one, coming out on top 5–1. The Panthers stormed back in game two, outscoring the Bruins 6–1 with Aleksander Barkov's two goals and two assists to tie the series 1–1. In game three, Evan Rodrigues scored twice and Matthew Tkachuk provided three assists for the Panthers, defeating the Bruins 6–2. The Panthers came back from a two-goal deficit in game four to win 3–2 and take a 3–1 series lead. In game five, Swayman made 28 saves for the Bruins as they held off the Panthers for a 2–1 victory, forcing a sixth game. Gustav Forsling scored with 1:33 left in the third period of game six for the Panthers, holding off the Bruins for a 2–1 victory and a second consecutive conference finals appearance. During the game, Boston set the record for the most "too many men on the ice" penalties in one playoff year with seven.

May 6	Boston Bruins	5–1	Florida Panthers	Amerant Bank Arena	Recap
No scoring		First period	No scoring
Morgan Geekie (3) – 12:52; Mason Lohrei (1) – 16:17; Brandon Carlo (2) – 19:39		Second period	11:45 – Matthew Tkachuk (4)
Justin Brazeau (1) – 07:13; Jake DeBrusk (4) – en – 16:38		Third period	No scoring
Jeremy Swayman 38 saves / 39 shots		Goalie stats	Sergei Bobrovsky 24 saves / 28 shots

May 8	Boston Bruins	1–6	Florida Panthers	Amerant Bank Arena	Recap
Charlie Coyle (1) – 12:12		First period	No scoring
No scoring		Second period	01:56 – Steven Lorentz (2); 09:49 – Aleksander Barkov (3); 19:58 – Gustav Forsling (1)
No scoring		Third period	01:28 – Eetu Luostarinen (1); 10:52 – pp – Aleksander Barkov (4); 11:58 – sh – Brandon Montour (2)
Jeremy Swayman 19 saves / 23 shots Linus Ullmark 8 saves / 10 shots		Goalie stats	Sergei Bobrovsky 14 saves / 15 shots

May 10	Florida Panthers	6–2	Boston Bruins	TD Garden	Recap
Evan Rodrigues (2) – 08:04		First period	No scoring
Vladimir Tarasenko (2) – pp – 16:14; Carter Verhaeghe (6) – pp – 17:14		Second period	No scoring
Brandon Montour (3) – pp – 03:09; Sam Reinhart (4) – en – 18:36; Evan Rodrigues (3) – pp – 19:09		Third period	05:01 – Jakub Lauko (1); 08:31 – Jake DeBrusk (5)
Sergei Bobrovsky 15 saves / 17 shots		Goalie stats	Jeremy Swayman 27 saves / 32 shots

May 12	Florida Panthers	3–2	Boston Bruins	TD Garden	Recap
No scoring		First period	08:53 – pp – David Pastrnak (4); 15:12 – Brandon Carlo (3)
Anton Lundell (1) – 14:48		Second period	No scoring
Sam Bennett (2) – pp – 03:41; Aleksander Barkov (5) – 07:31		Third period	No scoring
Sergei Bobrovsky 16 saves / 18 shots		Goalie stats	Jeremy Swayman 38 saves / 41 shots

May 14	Boston Bruins	2–1	Florida Panthers	Amerant Bank Arena	Recap
Morgan Geekie (4) – 04:49		First period	No scoring
Charlie McAvoy (1) – 10:25		Second period	06:23 – Sam Reinhart (5)
No scoring		Third period	No scoring
Jeremy Swayman 28 saves / 29 shots		Goalie stats	Sergei Bobrovsky 26 saves / 28 shots

May 17	Florida Panthers	2–1	Boston Bruins	TD Garden	Recap
No scoring		First period	19:07 – Pavel Zacha (1)
Anton Lundell (2) – 12:44		Second period	No scoring
Gustav Forsling (2) – 18:27		Third period	No scoring
Sergei Bobrovsky 22 saves / 23 shots		Goalie stats	Jeremy Swayman 26 saves / 28 shots

Florida won series 4–2

==== (M1) New York Rangers vs. (M2) Carolina Hurricanes ====
This was the third playoff meeting between these two teams with both teams splitting the two previous series. They last met in the 2022 Eastern Conference second round, which New York won in seven games. New York won two of the three games in the regular season series.

The Rangers defeated the Hurricanes in six games. In game one, Mika Zibanejad scored twice and provided an assist for the Rangers, defeating the Hurricanes 4–3. Artemi Panarin assisted thrice and Vincent Trocheck scored the double-overtime goal for the Rangers, taking a 2–0 series lead with a 4–3 victory. Igor Shesterkin made 45 saves in game three and Panarin scored the overtime goal for the Rangers, defeating the Hurricanes 3–2 for a 3–0 series lead. With the victory, the Rangers became the first team since the 2008 Pittsburgh Penguins to start 7–0 in the playoffs. The streak did not continue into game four as Brady Skjei's goal with 3:11 left in the game broke the tie for the Hurricanes, forcing a fifth game with a 4–3 victory. In game five, the Hurricanes scored four unanswered goals in the third period to defeat the Rangers 4–1 and force a sixth game. In game six, the Rangers came back from a two-goal deficit in the third period, capped off by Chris Kreider's natural hat trick to defeat the Hurricanes 5–3 and advance to the conference finals for the second time in three years, making them the first Presidents' Trophy-winning team to advance to the penultimate round since they did so in 2015.

May 5	Carolina Hurricanes	3–4	New York Rangers	Madison Square Garden	Recap
Jaccob Slavin (1) – 03:48		First period	02:46 – Mika Zibanejad (2); 10:05 – pp – Mika Zibanejad (3); 16:28 – pp – Vincent Trocheck (4)
No scoring		Second period	No scoring
Martin Necas (2) – 02:48; Seth Jarvis (4) – 18:13		Third period	08:21 – Artemi Panarin (3)
Frederik Andersen 19 saves / 23 shots		Goalie stats	Igor Shesterkin 22 saves / 25 shots

May 7	Carolina Hurricanes	3–4	2OT	New York Rangers	Madison Square Garden	Recap
Jake Guentzel (2) – 15:07; Dmitry Orlov (2) – 19:54		First period		10:53 – Alexis Lafreniere (1)
Jake Guentzel (3) – 18:18		Second period		07:32 – Alexis Lafreniere (2)
No scoring		Third period		06:07 – pp – Chris Kreider (3)
No scoring		Second overtime period		07:24 – pp – Vincent Trocheck (5)
Frederik Andersen 35 saves / 39 shots		Goalie stats		Igor Shesterkin 54 saves / 57 shots

May 9	New York Rangers	3–2	OT	Carolina Hurricanes	PNC Arena	Recap
No scoring		First period		10:14 – Jake Guentzel (4)
Chris Kreider (4) – sh – 08:30		Second period		No scoring
Alexis Lafreniere (3) – 06:25		Third period		18:24 – Andrei Svechnikov (2)
Artemi Panarin (4) – 01:43		First overtime period		No scoring
Igor Shesterkin 45 saves / 47 shots		Goalie stats		Pyotr Kochetkov 22 saves / 25 shots

May 11	New York Rangers	3–4	Carolina Hurricanes	PNC Arena	Recap
Will Cuylle (1) – 08:06		First period	01:51 – Evgeny Kuznetsov (3); 06:33 – Stefan Noesen (4); 15:29 – Sebastian Aho (3)
Barclay Goodrow (2) – 12:43		Second period	No scoring
Alexis Lafreniere (4) – 02:04		Third period	16:49 – pp – Brady Skjei (1)
Igor Shesterkin 27 saves / 31 shots		Goalie stats	Frederik Andersen 22 saves / 25 shots

May 13	Carolina Hurricanes	4–1	New York Rangers	Madison Square Garden	Recap
No scoring		First period	No scoring
No scoring		Second period	06:23 – sh – Jacob Trouba (1)
Jordan Staal (1) – 03:33; Evgeny Kuznetsov (4) – 06:39; Jordan Martinook (2) – 09:56; Martin Necas (3) – en – 16:29		Third period	No scoring
Frederik Andersen 20 saves / 21 shots		Goalie stats	Igor Shesterkin 24 saves / 27 shots

May 16	New York Rangers	5–3	Carolina Hurricanes	PNC Arena	Recap
No scoring		First period	18:38 – Martin Necas (4)
Vincent Trocheck (6) – 05:29		Second period	04:38 – pp – Seth Jarvis (5); 09:23 – Sebastian Aho (4)
Chris Kreider (5) – 06:43; Chris Kreider (6) – pp – 11:54; Chris Kreider (7) – 15:41; Barclay Goodrow (3) – en – 19:11		Third period	No scoring
Igor Shesterkin 33 saves / 36 shots		Goalie stats	Frederik Andersen 19 saves / 23 shots

New York won series 4–2

=== Western Conference second round ===
==== (C1) Dallas Stars vs. (C3) Colorado Avalanche ====
This was the sixth playoff series between these two teams with Dallas winning three of the five previous series. They last met in the 2020 Western Conference second round, which Dallas won in seven games. Colorado won three of the four games in the regular season series.

The Stars defeated the Avalanche in six games. In game one, the Avalanche mounted a three-goal comeback to force overtime during which, Miles Wood scored to give a Colorado a 4–3 victory. The Stars prevented a four-goal comeback from the Avalanche in game two, holding off Colorado for a 5–3 victory and tying the series. In game three, Jake Oettinger made 28 saves and both Tyler Seguin and Logan Stankoven scored twice to give the Stars a 4–1 victory. Wyatt Johnston scored twice and provided an assist for the Stars in game four, triumphing over the Avalanche 5–1 to take a 3–1 series lead. In game five, Cale Makar scored twice for Colorado who forced a sixth game with a 5–3 victory. Game six went into double-overtime, during which Stars forward Matt Duchene scored at 11:42 to give Dallas a 2–1 victory and a second consecutive conference finals appearance.

May 7	Colorado Avalanche	4–3	OT	Dallas Stars	American Airlines Center	Recap
No scoring		First period		07:26 – Ryan Suter (1); 10:55 – Wyatt Johnston (5); 16:56 – pp – Jamie Benn (2)
Valeri Nichushkin (8) – pp – 05:31; Cale Makar (3) – pp – 09:08		Second period		No scoring
Nathan MacKinnon (3) – 00:39		Third period		No scoring
Miles Wood (3) – 11:03		First overtime period		No scoring
Alexandar Georgiev 19 saves / 22 shots		Goalie stats		Jake Oettinger 22 saves / 26 shots

May 9	Colorado Avalanche	3–5	Dallas Stars	American Airlines Center	Recap
No scoring		First period	14:46 – pp – Miro Heiskanen (2)
No scoring		Second period	01:57 – Roope Hintz (2); 15:54 – pp – Miro Heiskanen (3); 18:06 – sh – Tyler Seguin (1)
Joel Kiviranta (1) – 04:06; Brandon Duhaime (1) – 08:00; Valeri Nichushkin (9) – 16:16		Third period	19:39 – en – Esa Lindell (1)
Alexandar Georgiev 27 saves / 31 shots		Goalie stats	Jake Oettinger 28 saves / 31 shots

May 11	Dallas Stars	4–1	Colorado Avalanche	Ball Arena	Recap
Logan Stankoven (1) – 18:39		First period	No scoring
Tyler Seguin (2) – 15:13		Second period	10:24 – Mikko Rantanen (3)
Tyler Seguin (3) – en – 18:23; Logan Stankoven (2) – en – 19:32		Third period	No scoring
Jake Oettinger 28 saves / 29 shots		Goalie stats	Alexandar Georgiev 19 saves / 21 shots

May 13	Dallas Stars	5–1	Colorado Avalanche	Ball Arena	Recap
Wyatt Johnston (6) – sh – 15:37		First period	No scoring
Wyatt Johnston (7) – pp – 05:46; Miro Heiskanen (4) – 11:24		Second period	12:35 – Casey Mittelstadt (2)
Evgenii Dadonov (3) – 09:27; Sam Steel (1) – en – 18:10		Third period	No scoring
Jake Oettinger 24 saves / 25 shots		Goalie stats	Alexandar Georgiev 29 saves / 33 shots

May 15	Colorado Avalanche	5–3	Dallas Stars	American Airlines Center	Recap
Artturi Lehkonen (6) – pp – 19:59		First period	09:03 – Joe Pavelski (1)
Cale Makar (4) – pp – 17:24		Second period	11:39 – pp – Miro Heiskanen (5)
Casey Mittelstadt (3) – 01:12; Cale Makar (5) – 04:28; Nathan MacKinnon (4) – 16:50		Third period	05:44 – Logan Stankoven (3)
Alexandar Georgiev 23 saves / 26 shots		Goalie stats	Jake Oettinger 22 saves / 27 shots

May 17	Dallas Stars	2–1	2OT	Colorado Avalanche	Ball Arena	Recap
No scoring		First period		No scoring
No scoring		Second period		05:48 – pp – Mikko Rantanen (4)
Jamie Benn (3) – 01:56		Third period		No scoring
Matt Duchene (2) – 11:42		Second overtime period		No scoring
Jake Oettinger 29 saves / 30 shots		Goalie stats		Alexandar Georgiev 36 saves / 38 shots

Dallas won series 4–2

==== (P1) Vancouver Canucks vs. (P2) Edmonton Oilers ====
This was the third playoff meeting between these two teams with Edmonton winning both previous series. They last met in the 1992 Smythe Division final, which Edmonton won in six games. Vancouver won all four games in the regular season series.

The Oilers defeated the Canucks in seven games. In game one, Conor Garland beat Stuart Skinner with 5:34 left in the third period to take the lead, ultimately defeating the Oilers 5–4. In game two, Evan Bouchard scored the overtime game-winning goal for the Oilers, emerging victorious 4–3. Arturs Silovs made 42 saves for the Canucks in game three, helping Vancouver win 4–3. Although the Canucks came back from a two-goal deficit in game four to tie the game, Bouchard scored with 39 seconds remaining in the game to give the Oilers a 3–2 victory to tie the series 2–2. In game five, J. T. Miller scored with 33 seconds remaining in the third period to give the Canucks a 3–2 victory and a 3–2 series lead. Connor McDavid assisted three times in game six, pushing the series to a seventh game with a 5–1 victory. In game seven, the Oilers prevented a three-goal third period comeback from the Canucks, defeating Vancouver 3–2 to advance to the conference finals.

May 8	Edmonton Oilers	4–5	Vancouver Canucks	Rogers Arena	Recap
Zach Hyman (8) – pp – 02:11; Mattias Ekholm (1) – 15:01		First period	No scoring
Cody Ceci (1) – 12:26; Zach Hyman (9) – 13:11		Second period	00:53 – Dakota Joshua (3); 17:01 – Elias Lindholm (3)
No scoring		Third period	09:38 – J. T. Miller (2); 13:47 – Nikita Zadorov (3); 14:26 – Conor Garland (1)
Stuart Skinner 19 saves / 24 shots		Goalie stats	Arturs Silovs 14 saves / 18 shots

May 10	Edmonton Oilers	4–3	OT	Vancouver Canucks	Rogers Arena	Recap
Leon Draisaitl (6) – pp – 10:56		First period		04:14 – pp – Elias Pettersson (1)
Mattias Ekholm (2) – 01:16		Second period		00:53 – Brock Boeser (5); 18:17 – Nikita Zadorov (4)
Connor McDavid (2) – 05:27		Third period		No scoring
Evan Bouchard (2) – 05:38		First overtime period		No scoring
Stuart Skinner 16 saves / 19 shots		Goalie stats		Arturs Silovs 27 saves / 31 shots

May 12	Vancouver Canucks	4–3	Edmonton Oilers	Rogers Place	Recap
Elias Lindholm (4) – pp – 08:45; Brock Boeser (6) – 13:18; Brock Boeser (7) – 18:34		First period	05:37 – pp – Mattias Ekholm (3)
Elias Lindholm (5) – pp – 17:35		Second period	03:36 – pp – Leon Draisaitl (7)
No scoring		Third period	18:44 – Evan Bouchard (3)
Arturs Silovs 42 saves / 45 shots		Goalie stats	Stuart Skinner 11 saves / 15 shots Calvin Pickard 3 saves / 3 shots

May 14	Vancouver Canucks	2–3	Edmonton Oilers	Rogers Place	Recap
No scoring		First period	11:10 – pp – Leon Draisaitl (8)
No scoring		Second period	19:20 – Ryan Nugent-Hopkins (2)
Conor Garland (2) – 06:54; Dakota Joshua (4) – 18:19		Third period	19:21 – Evan Bouchard (4)
Arturs Silovs 27 saves / 30 shots		Goalie stats	Calvin Pickard 19 saves / 21 shots

May 16	Edmonton Oilers	2–3	Vancouver Canucks	Rogers Arena	Recap
Evander Kane (3) – 04:34; Mattias Janmark (1) – 17:50		First period	17:27 – Carson Soucy (1)
No scoring		Second period	05:14 – Phillip Di Giuseppe (1)
No scoring		Third period	19:27 – J. T. Miller (3)
Calvin Pickard 32 saves / 35 shots		Goalie stats	Arturs Silovs 21 saves / 23 shots

May 18	Vancouver Canucks	1–5	Edmonton Oilers	Rogers Place	Recap
Nils Hoglander (1) – 10:03		First period	08:18 – Dylan Holloway (3)
No scoring		Second period	07:14 – Zach Hyman (10); 11:20 – Evan Bouchard (5)
No scoring		Third period	03:25 – Ryan Nugent-Hopkins (3); 13:04 – Evander Kane (4)
Arturs Silovs 22 saves / 27 shots		Goalie stats	Stuart Skinner 14 saves / 15 shots

May 20	Edmonton Oilers	3–2	Vancouver Canucks	Rogers Arena	Recap
No scoring		First period	No scoring
Cody Ceci (2) – 01:16; Zach Hyman (11) – 05:50; Ryan Nugent-Hopkins (4) – pp – 15:22		Second period	No scoring
No scoring		Third period	11:27 – Conor Garland (3); 15:24 – Filip Hronek (1)
Stuart Skinner 15 saves / 17 shots		Goalie stats	Arturs Silovs 26 saves / 29 shots

Edmonton won series 4–3

== Conference finals ==
=== Eastern Conference final ===
==== (M1) New York Rangers vs. (A1) Florida Panthers ====
This was the second playoff meeting between these two teams. Their only previous meeting was in the 1997 Eastern Conference quarterfinals, which New York won in five games. The Rangers made their eighth semifinals/conference finals appearance since the league began using a 16-team or greater playoff format in 1980. They lost their most recent appearance in the 2022 Eastern Conference final to the Tampa Bay Lightning in six games. This was Florida's second consecutive and third overall conference finals appearance. They won the previous year's Eastern Conference final in a four-game sweep against the Carolina Hurricanes. Florida won two of the three games in the regular season series. This was also the fourth Eastern Conference Finals in the past five years to feature Florida vs New York teams.

The Panthers defeated the Rangers in six games. In game one, goaltender Sergei Bobrovsky shut out the Rangers with a 24-save 3–0 victory for the Panthers. Barclay Goodrow scored the overtime-winning goal for the Rangers in game two, evening the series with a 2–1 triumph. Although Florida tied game three after being down by two goals, Alexander Wennberg scored in overtime to give New York a 5–4 victory. In game four, and for the third straight game, the match ended in overtime with Sam Reinhart of the Panthers scoring to even the series 2–2 with a 3–2 win. Sam Bennett provided a goal and an assist for the Panthers in game five, leading Florida to a 3–2 victory and a 3–2 series lead. In game six, the Panthers held off a late push in the third period to win 2–1, advancing to a second consecutive Finals appearance.

May 22	Florida Panthers	3–0	New York Rangers	Madison Square Garden	Recap
Matthew Tkachuk (5) – 16:26		First period	No scoring
No scoring		Second period	No scoring
Carter Verhaeghe (7) – 16:12; Sam Bennett (3) – en – 18:41		Third period	No scoring
Sergei Bobrovsky 24 saves / 24 shots		Goalie stats	Igor Shesterkin 24 saves / 26 shots

May 24	Florida Panthers	1–2	OT	New York Rangers	Madison Square Garden	Recap
Carter Verhaeghe (8) – pp – 18:09		First period		04:12 – Vincent Trocheck (7)
No scoring		Second period		No scoring
No scoring		Third period		No scoring
No scoring		First overtime period		14:01 – Barclay Goodrow (4)
Sergei Bobrovsky 28 saves / 30 shots		Goalie stats		Igor Shesterkin 26 saves / 27 shots

May 26	New York Rangers	5–4	OT	Florida Panthers	Amerant Bank Arena	Recap
Alexis Lafreniere (5) – 07:17; Barclay Goodrow (5) – 07:42		First period		02:50 – pp – Sam Reinhart (6); 14:46 – pp – Sam Reinhart (7)
Alexis Lafreniere (6) – 15:23; Barclay Goodrow (6) – sh – 18:14		Second period		No scoring
No scoring		Third period		05:04 – Aleksander Barkov (6); 06:58 – Gustav Forsling (3)
Alexander Wennberg (1) – 05:35		First overtime period		No scoring
Igor Shesterkin 33 saves / 37 shots		Goalie stats		Sergei Bobrovsky 18 saves / 23 shots

May 28	New York Rangers	2–3	OT	Florida Panthers	Amerant Bank Arena	Recap
Vincent Trocheck (8) – pp – 08:51		First period		No scoring
No scoring		Second period		08:45 – Sam Bennett (4); 12:16 – pp – Carter Verhaeghe (9)
Alexis Lafreniere (7) – 03:28		Third period		No scoring
No scoring		First overtime period		01:12 – pp – Sam Reinhart (8)
Igor Shesterkin 37 saves / 40 shots		Goalie stats		Sergei Bobrovsky 21 saves / 23 shots

May 30	Florida Panthers	3–2	New York Rangers	Madison Square Garden	Recap
No scoring		First period	No scoring
Gustav Forsling (4) – 08:21		Second period	02:04 – sh – Chris Kreider (8)
Anton Lundell (3) – 10:22; Sam Bennett (5) – en – 18:08		Third period	19:10 – Alexis Lafreniere (8)
Sergei Bobrovsky 25 saves / 27 shots		Goalie stats	Igor Shesterkin 34 saves / 36 shots

June 1	New York Rangers	1–2	Florida Panthers	Amerant Bank Arena	Recap
No scoring		First period	19:10 – Sam Bennett (6)
No scoring		Second period	No scoring
Artemi Panarin (5) – 18:20		Third period	09:08 – Vladimir Tarasenko (3)
Igor Shesterkin 32 saves / 34 shots		Goalie stats	Sergei Bobrovsky 23 saves / 24 shots

Florida won series 4–2

=== Western Conference final ===
==== (C1) Dallas Stars vs. (P2) Edmonton Oilers ====
This was the ninth playoff meeting between these two teams with Dallas winning six of the eight previous series and the past five playoff series. They last met in the 2003 Western Conference quarterfinals, which Dallas won in six games. This was Dallas's second consecutive and eleventh semifinals/conference finals appearance overall since the league began using a 16-team or greater playoff format in 1980. They lost the previous year's Western Conference final to the Vegas Golden Knights in six games. Edmonton made their eleventh conference finals appearance. They last made the conference finals in 2022, which they lost to the Colorado Avalanche in a four-game sweep. Dallas won two of the three games in the regular season series.

The Oilers defeated the Stars in six games and won a playoff series against the Stars for the first time since 1997, ending a five series losing streak. Oilers captain Connor McDavid ended game one 32 seconds into double-overtime, giving Edmonton a 3–2 victory. Stars captain Jamie Benn provided a goal and an assist in game two for the Stars, evening the series with a 3–1 victory. Jason Robertson scored a hat-trick in game three for the Stars, defeating the Oilers 5–3. In game four, the Oilers came back from an early two-goal deficit by scoring five unanswered goals, easing past the Stars 5–2 to tie the series 2–2. Ryan Nugent-Hopkins scored twice in game five, defeating the Stars with a 3–1 victory. In game six, Stuart Skinner made 33 saves as the Oilers advanced to the Finals for the first time in 18 years with a 2–1 victory.

May 23	Edmonton Oilers	3–2	2OT	Dallas Stars	American Airlines Center	Recap
No scoring		First period		No scoring
Leon Draisaitl (9) – 00:58; Zach Hyman (12) – 04:17		Second period		06:11 – Tyler Seguin (4)
No scoring		Third period		16:37 – Tyler Seguin (5)
Connor McDavid (3) – 00:32		Second overtime period		No scoring
Stuart Skinner 31 saves / 33 shots		Goalie stats		Jake Oettinger 35 saves / 38 shots

May 25	Edmonton Oilers	1–3	Dallas Stars	American Airlines Center	Recap
Connor Brown (1) – 04:23		First period	03:39 – Jamie Benn (4)
No scoring		Second period	No scoring
No scoring		Third period	03:41 – Mason Marchment (2); 17:57 – en – Esa Lindell (2)
Stuart Skinner 22 saves / 24 shots		Goalie stats	Jake Oettinger 28 saves / 29 shots

May 27	Dallas Stars	5–3	Edmonton Oilers	Rogers Place	Recap
No scoring		First period	02:02 – Zach Hyman (13); 07:37 – Connor McDavid (4)
Jason Robertson (4) – 05:35; Jason Robertson (5) – 08:05; Wyatt Johnston (8) – 09:08		Second period	19:07 – Adam Henrique (2)
Jason Robertson (6) – 11:54; Miro Heiskanen (6) – en – 18:08		Third period	No scoring
Jake Oettinger 27 saves / 30 shots		Goalie stats	Stuart Skinner 17 saves / 21 shots

May 29	Dallas Stars	2–5	Edmonton Oilers	Rogers Place	Recap
Wyatt Johnston (9) – 00:58; Esa Lindell (3) – 05:29		First period	13:30 – Ryan McLeod (1); 16:17 – Evan Bouchard (6)
No scoring		Second period	14:31 – sh – Mattias Janmark (2); 15:22 – Leon Draisaitl (10)
No scoring		Third period	18:07 – en – Mattias Ekholm (4)
Jake Oettinger 24 saves / 28 shots		Goalie stats	Stuart Skinner 20 saves / 22 shots

May 31	Edmonton Oilers	3–1	Dallas Stars	American Airlines Center	Recap
Ryan Nugent-Hopkins (5) – pp – 14:09		First period	No scoring
Ryan Nugent-Hopkins (6) – pp – 01:06; Philip Broberg (1) – 05:09		Second period	No scoring
No scoring		Third period	14:09 – Wyatt Johnston (10)
Stuart Skinner 19 saves / 20 shots		Goalie stats	Jake Oettinger 23 saves / 26 shots

June 2	Dallas Stars	1–2	Edmonton Oilers	Rogers Place	Recap
No scoring		First period	04:17 – pp – Connor McDavid (5); 15:42 – pp – Zach Hyman (14)
No scoring		Second period	No scoring
Mason Marchment (3) – 09:18		Third period	No scoring
Jake Oettinger 8 saves / 10 shots		Goalie stats	Stuart Skinner 33 saves / 34 shots

Edmonton won series 4–2

== Stanley Cup Final ==
This was the first playoff meeting between these two teams. This was the second consecutive and third overall Finals appearance for the Panthers. They lost the previous 2023 Stanley Cup Final against the Vegas Golden Knights in five games. This was Edmonton's eighth Finals appearance. They lost their previous appearance against the Carolina Hurricanes in seven games in 2006. Florida won both games in the regular season series.

June 8	Edmonton Oilers	0–3	Florida Panthers	Amerant Bank Arena	Recap
No scoring		First period	03:59 – Carter Verhaeghe (10)
No scoring		Second period	02:16 – Evan Rodrigues (4)
No scoring		Third period	19:55 – en – Eetu Luostarinen (2)
Stuart Skinner 15 saves / 17 shots		Goalie stats	Sergei Bobrovsky 32 saves / 32 shots

June 10	Edmonton Oilers	1–4	Florida Panthers	Amerant Bank Arena	Recap
Mattias Ekholm (5) – 11:17		First period	No scoring
No scoring		Second period	09:34 – Niko Mikkola (2)
No scoring		Third period	03:11 – Evan Rodrigues (5); 12:26 – pp – Evan Rodrigues (6); 17:32 – en – Aaron Ekblad (1)
Stuart Skinner 25 saves / 28 shots		Goalie stats	Sergei Bobrovsky 18 saves / 19 shots

June 13	Florida Panthers	4–3	Edmonton Oilers	Rogers Place	Recap
Sam Reinhart (9) – 18:58		First period	No scoring
Vladimir Tarasenko (4) – 09:12; Sam Bennett (7) – 13:57; Aleksander Barkov (7) – 15:31		Second period	01:49 – Warren Foegele (2)
No scoring		Third period	06:02 – Philip Broberg (2); 14:43 – Ryan McLeod (2)
Sergei Bobrovsky 32 saves / 35 shots		Goalie stats	Stuart Skinner 19 saves / 23 shots

June 15	Florida Panthers	1–8	Edmonton Oilers	Rogers Place	Recap
Vladimir Tarasenko (5) – 11:26		First period	03:11 – sh – Mattias Janmark (3); 07:48 – Adam Henrique (3); 14:48 – Dylan Holloway (4)
No scoring		Second period	01:13 – Connor McDavid (6); 04:59 – Darnell Nurse (1); 13:03 – pp – Ryan Nugent-Hopkins (7)
No scoring		Third period	14:11 – Dylan Holloway (5); 16:41 – Ryan McLeod (3)
Sergei Bobrovsky 11 saves / 16 shots Anthony Stolarz 16 saves / 19 shots		Goalie stats	Stuart Skinner 32 saves / 33 shots

June 18	Edmonton Oilers	5–3	Florida Panthers	Amerant Bank Arena	Recap
Connor Brown (2) – sh – 05:30		First period	No scoring
Zach Hyman (15) – pp – 01:58; Connor McDavid (7) – 05:00; Corey Perry (1) – pp – 11:54		Second period	06:53 – Matthew Tkachuk (6); 12:08 – Evan Rodrigues (7)
Connor McDavid (8) – en – 19:41		Third period	04:04 – Oliver Ekman-Larsson (2)
Stuart Skinner 29 saves / 32 shots		Goalie stats	Sergei Bobrovsky 19 saves / 23 shots

June 21	Florida Panthers	1–5	Edmonton Oilers	Rogers Place	Recap
No scoring		First period	07:27 – Warren Foegele (3)
No scoring		Second period	00:46 – Adam Henrique (4); 18:20 – Zach Hyman (16)
Aleksander Barkov (8) – 01:28		Third period	16:45 – en – Ryan McLeod (4); 16:57 – en – Darnell Nurse (2)
Sergei Bobrovsky 16 saves / 19 shots		Goalie stats	Stuart Skinner 20 saves / 21 shots

June 24	Edmonton Oilers	1–2	Florida Panthers	Amerant Bank Arena	Recap
Mattias Janmark (4) – 06:44		First period	04:27 – Carter Verhaeghe (11)
No scoring		Second period	15:11 – Sam Reinhart (10)
No scoring		Third period	No scoring
Stuart Skinner 19 saves / 21 shots		Goalie stats	Sergei Bobrovsky 23 saves / 24 shots

Florida won series 4–3

== Player statistics ==
=== Skaters ===
These were the top ten skaters based on points, following the conclusion of the playoffs.

Player	Team	GP	G	A	Pts	+/–	PIM
Connor McDavid	Edmonton Oilers	25	8	34	42	+12	10
Evan Bouchard	Edmonton Oilers	25	6	26	32	+14	22
Leon Draisaitl	Edmonton Oilers	25	10	21	31	0	14
Zach Hyman	Edmonton Oilers	25	16	6	22	+12	12
Aleksander Barkov	Florida Panthers	24	8	14	22	–1	8
Ryan Nugent-Hopkins	Edmonton Oilers	25	7	15	22	–2	8
Matthew Tkachuk	Florida Panthers	24	6	16	22	0	31
Carter Verhaeghe	Florida Panthers	24	11	10	21	–5	20
Vincent Trocheck	New York Rangers	16	8	12	20	+3	10
Anton Lundell	Florida Panthers	24	3	14	17	+8	12

=== Goaltenders ===
This is a combined table of the top five goaltenders based on goals against average and the top five goaltenders based on save percentage, with at least 420 minutes played. The table is sorted by GAA, and the criteria for inclusion are bolded.

Player	Team	GP	W	L	SA	GA	GAA	SV%	SO	TOI
Jeremy Swayman	Boston Bruins	12	6	6	373	25	**2.15**	**.933**	0	697:31
Jake Oettinger	Dallas Stars	19	10	9	516	45	**2.24**	**.915**	0	1,206:47
Sergei Bobrovsky	Florida Panthers	24	16	8	583	55	**2.32**	**.906**	2	1,419:32
Igor Shesterkin	New York Rangers	16	10	6	524	39	**2.34**	**.927**	0	999:51
Stuart Skinner	Edmonton Oilers	23	14	9	564	56	**2.45**	**.901**	1	1,373:20

== Media ==
=== Canada ===
In Canada, this marked the tenth postseason under Rogers Media's 12-year contract. Games aired across Sportsnet, SN1, SN360, and CBC under the Hockey Night in Canada brand. For first and second-round U.S.–U.S. games not on CBC, Sportsnet generally simulcasts the U.S. feed instead of producing their own telecast. The 2024 Stanley Cup Final simulcast on both CBC and Sportsnet.

Sportsnet+ streams every game. CBC Gem was not streaming games televised on CBC this postseason, and any first-round games that appeared on that streaming service was due to an error.

=== United States ===
In the U.S., this marked the third year of a seven-year agreement with ESPN/ABC and TNT Sports (formerly Warner Bros. Discovery Sports during the previous 2023 postseason, and Turner Sports two years prior).

In the first round, games were split between ESPN-produced telecasts (either on ESPN, ABC, or ESPN2) and TNT Sports-produced telecasts (either on TNT or TBS, with selected simulcasts on TruTV). Each U.S. team's regional broadcaster also televised local coverage of first round series, except for games on ABC.

ESPN/ABC had the first choice of which conference final series to air, choosing the Eastern Conference Finals this season, and TNT aired the Western Conference Finals. As per the alternating rotation, ABC aired the 2024 Stanley Cup Final.

This was the first playoff that the streaming service Max had live access to all TNT Sports-produced games on its Bleacher Report Sports add-on tier. ESPN+ streamed all ABC games and ESPN's Conference final games.

This was the third of a four-year deal that Sports USA Radio Network was syndicating select Stanley Cup playoff games via NHL Radio across the U.S., including the entire conference finals and Stanley Cup Final.

Preceded by 2023 Stanley Cup playoffs	Stanley Cup playoffs 2024	Succeeded by 2025 Stanley Cup playoffs
