= Vincent Trocheck =

American ice hockey player (born 1993)

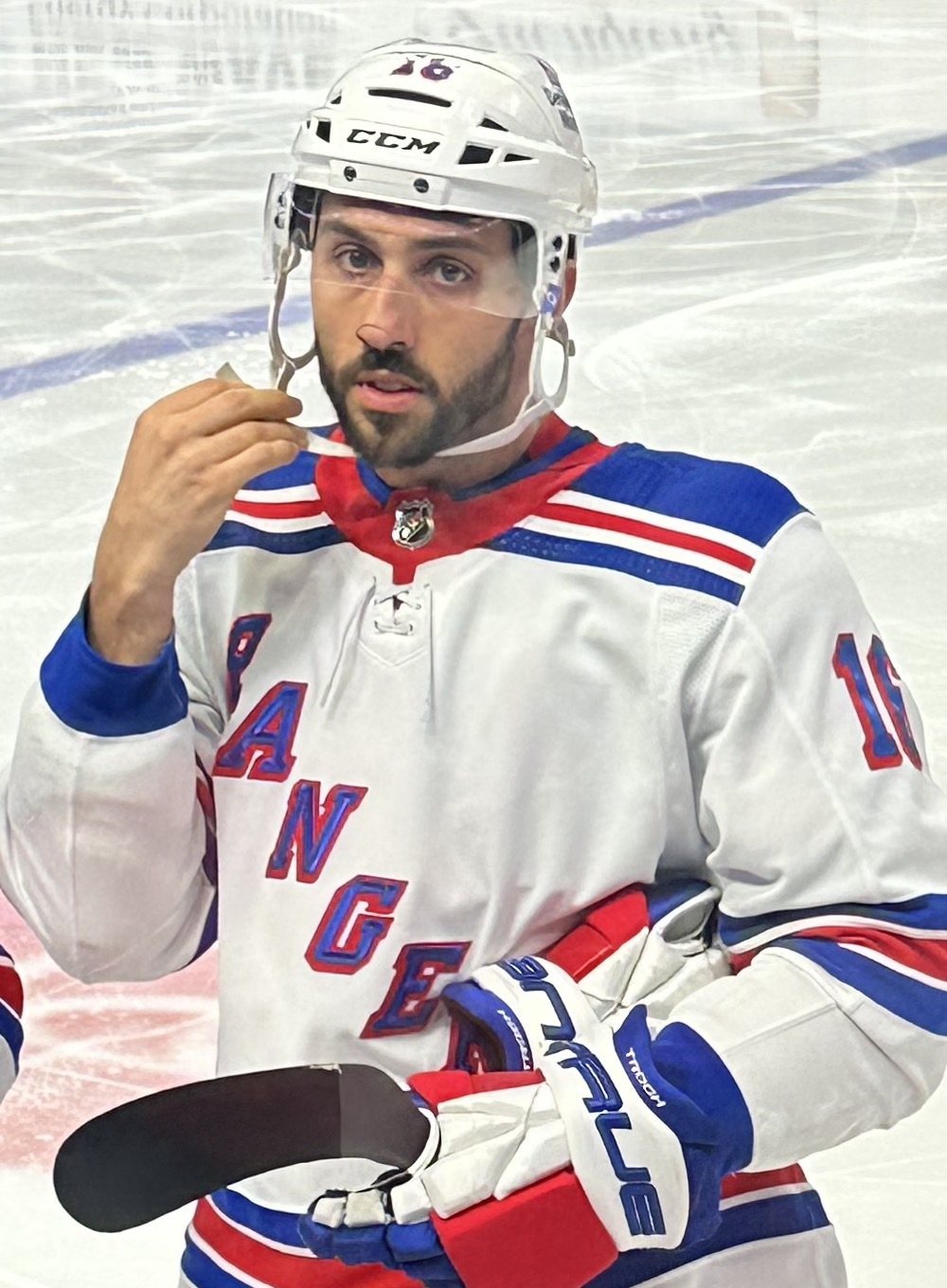
- Trocheck with the New York Rangers in 2023
- Born: July 11, 1993 (age 33) Pittsburgh, Pennsylvania, U.S.
- Height: 5 ft 10 in (178 cm)
- Weight: 183 lb (83 kg; 13 st 1 lb)
- Position: Center
- Shoots: Right
- NHL team Former teams: Utah Mammoth; Florida Panthers; Carolina Hurricanes; New York Rangers
- National team: United States
- NHL draft: 64th overall, 2011; Florida Panthers
- Playing career: 2013–present

Vincent Trocheck (born July 11, 1993) is an American professional ice hockey player who is a center for the Utah Mammoth of the National Hockey League (NHL). He was selected by the Florida Panthers in the third round, 64th overall, of the 2011 NHL entry draft.

== Playing career ==
=== Early life ===
Trocheck was born on July 11, 1993, in Pittsburgh, Pennsylvania, and grew up playing minor ice hockey for the Pittsburgh Hornets until he was 13 years old. Trocheck also competed with the Hornets in the 2006 Quebec International Pee-Wee Hockey Tournament.

=== Junior ===
Trocheck chose to move to Detroit at the age of 13 with his father in an effort to earn attention from scouts. While in Detroit, Trocheck learned about the Ontario Hockey League (OHL) and began attending Plymouth Whalers games. He joined the Detroit Little Caesars AAA team for the 2006–07 season and remained with them for three consecutive seasons. During his time with the team, Trocheck participated in the 2008 Port Huron Silver Stick tournament and was named to the Bantam All-Star team. In his final season with the Detroit Little Caesars, Trocheck posted 17 goals and 14 assists through 36 games. His performance in the 2009 state championship resulted in him being scouted by the Saginaw Spirit of the OHL. He was invited to see Game 3 of their first-round playoff series and was subsequently drafted by the Spirit in the 2009 OHL Priority Draft.

Upon signing with the Spirit in 2009, Trocheck reconnected with his former Pee-Wee teammate Brandon Saad in hopes of convincing him to commit to the team. Trocheck began his rookie season strong, tallying seven points through his first 10 games in the OHL. He spent the majority of his rookie season skating on the Spirit's third line, where he recorded 15 goals and 28 assists. At the conclusion of his rookie season, Trocheck received the Spirit's Fan Favorite Award.

After Saad signed with the Spirit in 2010, the two began the 2010–11 season on a line together. Through their first four games of the season, Trocheck tallied seven points while Saad added three goals. Following the teams first shutout loss of the season, Trocheck was moved onto the Spirit's second line with Josh Shalla. In their first game together, Trocheck assisted on each of Shalla's four goals in a 5-2 win over the Windsor Spitfires. By January, Trocheck was ranked 42nd amongst all draft-eligible OHL forwards and defensemen by the NHL Central Scouting Bureau. He was also selected alongside Saad to compete for Team Orr at the 2011 CHL Top Prospects Game. On March 17, 2011, Trocheck recorded his 25th goal of the season in a 5-0 win over the Spitfires to help lead the Spirit to their first Western Conference division title in franchise history. In Game 6 of the Western Conference quarterfinals, Trocheck scored two goals to lead the Spirit over the Guelph Storm and onto their second Western Conference Semifinals series in franchise history. Trocheck finished the postseason with six goals and five assists for 11 points over 12 games. Leading up to the 2011 NHL entry draft, Trocheck was ranked 41st amongst all North American draft-eligible forwards and defensemen by the NHL Central Scouting Bureau. He was eventually selected by the Florida Panthers in the third round of the draft, and attended their 2011 training camp. He was also drafted in the fifth round, 137th overall, by the Vityaz Chekhov in the KHL Junior Draft.

Upon graduating from high school, Trocheck began attending Northwood University while still competing for the Spirit. Trocheck returned to the Spirit's top line with Saad to start the 2011–12 season. Through his first 10 games, Trocheck ranked second on the team with six goals and three assists. On April 23, 2012, Trocheck was signed to a three-year, entry-level contract with the Panthers. Although Trocheck did not finish the 2011–12 season on the Spirit's top line of Saad, Shalla, and Michael Fine, he still led the team with 29 goals and 56 assists.

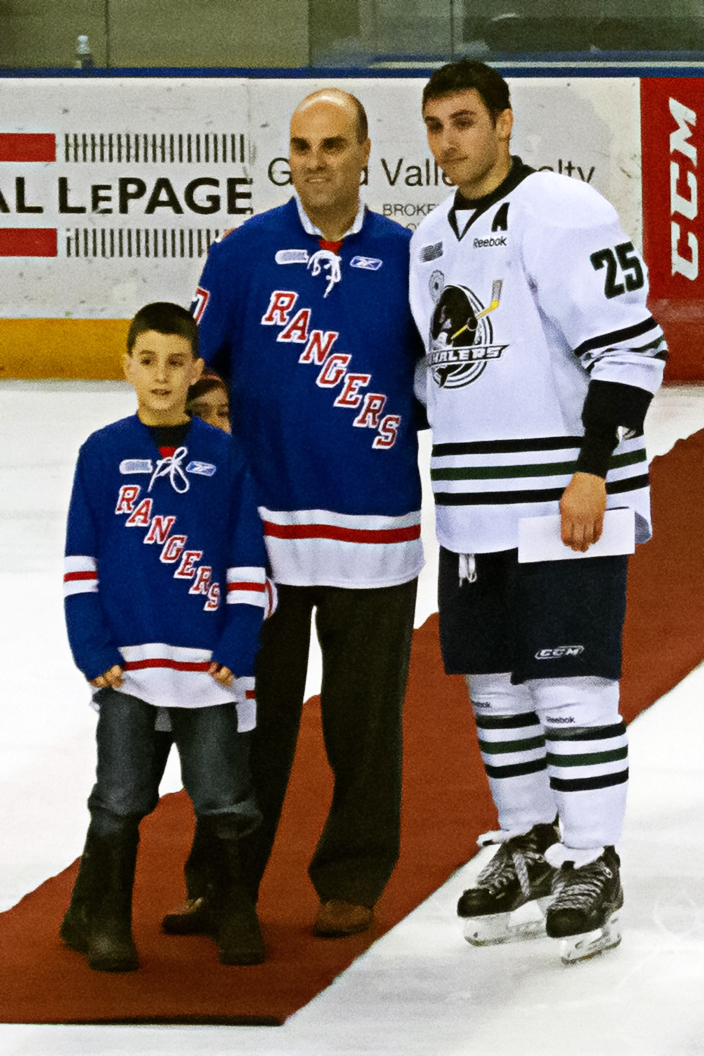
Trocheck (right) after a game with the Whalers in 2013.

Prior to the start of the 2012–13 season, Trocheck replaced Saad as team captain. On November 5, Trocheck tied the Saginaw Spirit career record for assists after recording one point in a loss to the Sarnia Sting. In a later game against the Sting on December 1, Trocheck moved into second place on the Spirit's all-time points list with 231 points. On January 10, 2013, Trocheck was traded to the Plymouth Whalers in exchange for Zach Bratina, a 2nd and 3rd round pick in the 2015 OHL Priority Selection and a 3rd round pick in 2016. At the time of the trade, Trocheck had secured the franchise record for most assists with 146 and was seven points shy of McDonough’s franchise record of 247 points. Through his 28 games with the Whalers, Trocheck recorded 26 goals and 33 assists for 59 points en route to the 2013 OHL playoffs. Trocheck was recognized as the OHL's Player of the Week for the final week of the regular season after setting numerous personal milestones. He became the first Whalers player in a decade to score 50 goals and overtook Sting forward Charles Sarault for the league lead in points. The league recognized Trocheck's efforts during the regular season by awarding him the Eddie Powers Memorial Trophy and Red Tilson Trophy as the most outstanding player and league top scorer. Trocheck was also named to the 2012–13 OHL's First All-Star Team.

In Game 1 of the conference quarterfinals against the Sting, Trocheck recorded a hat-trick en route to an 11–2 win. Through their four-game series against Sarnia, Trocheck led the OHL in scoring with five goals and seven assists. He continued scoring at a rapid pace through the Whalers conference semifinals win over the Owen Sound Attack and conference finals loss against the London Knights. Trocheck finished the playoffs with 10 goals and 14 assists for 24 points through 15 games.

In 2017, Trocheck became the first player in Spirit history to have his jersey number retired by the team.

=== Professional ===
==== Florida Panthers (2013–2020) ====
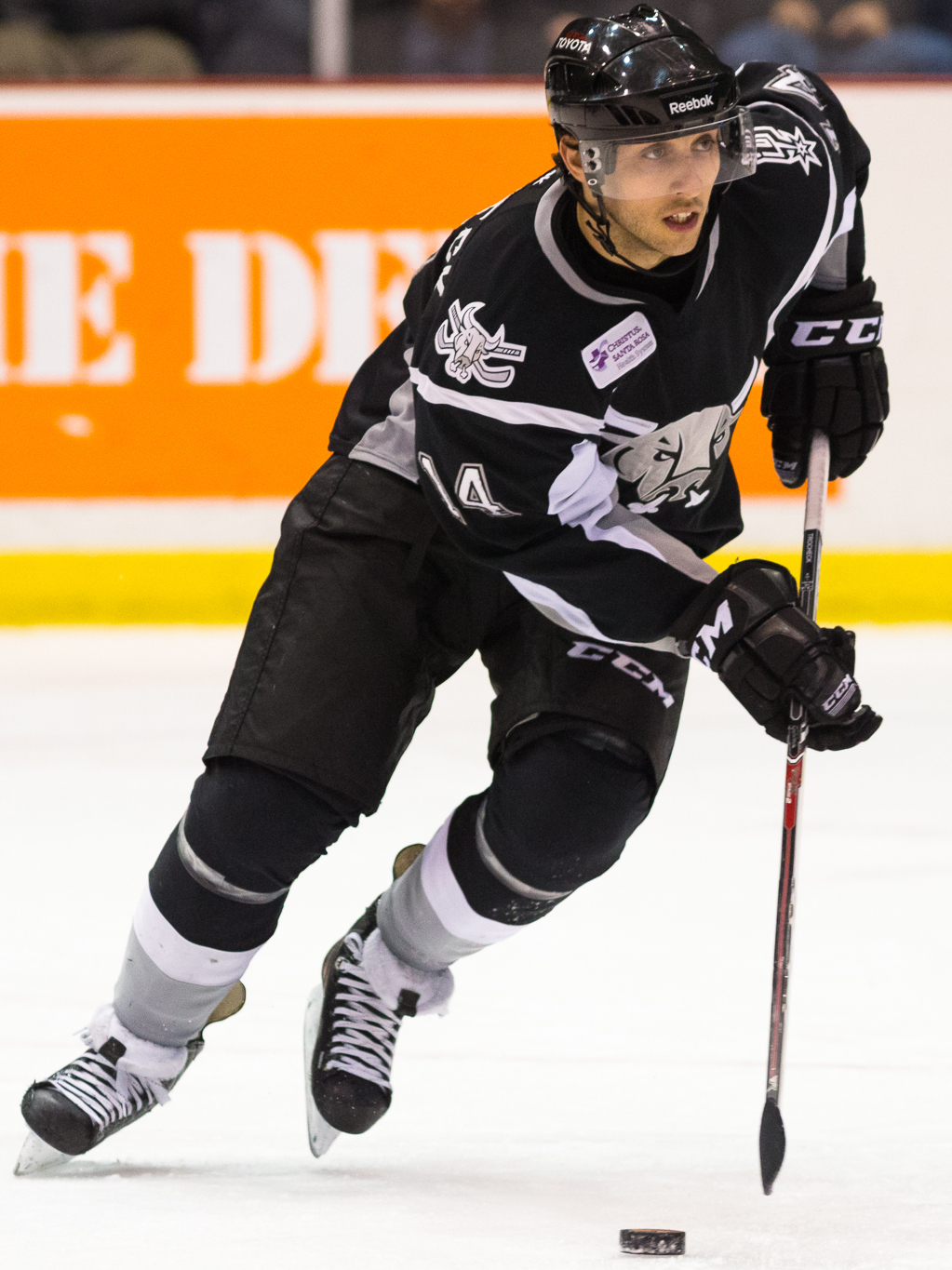
Trocheck with the San Antonio Rampage in 2013.

After finishing the 2012–13 season with the Whalers, Trocheck attended the Florida Panthers' 2013 training camp. However, he was reassigned to the Panthers American Hockey League (AHL) affiliate, the San Antonio Rampage, on September 25. He recorded his first professional point, an assist, on October 4 against the Chicago Wolves. He scored his first two professional goals within six minutes of each other in a win over the Wolves on October 13. Trocheck recorded nine goals and nine assists through his first 19 professional games with the Rampage. He led the team in scoring through the remainder of the year while playing alongside wingers Greg Rallo and Bobby Butler. Immediately following the conclusion of the NHL trade deadline, Trocheck was recalled to the NHL level on March 6, 2014. He made his NHL debut the following night against the Buffalo Sabres, where he registered three shots on goal in 17:35 minutes of ice-time. He then scored his first NHL goal in his fifth NHL game against the New Jersey Devils on March 14. Trocheck finished the 2013–14 season with the Panthers recording five goals and three assists, while also leading all Panther forwards in ice time per game.

Following his rookie season, Trocheck again attended the Panthers training camp before being reassigned to the AHL to start the 2014–15 season. He recorded two goals and four assists through eight games with the Rampage before being recalled to the NHL on October 31, 2014. Trocheck spent the majority of the season with the Panthers, recording seven goals and 15 assists through 50 games. He was reassigned to the Rampage on April 13, 2015, to play out the remainder of the regular season in the AHL.

The 2015–16 season was Trocheck's first full season at the NHL level, as he had alternated between the AHL and NHL during the previous two seasons. Following an early season injury to forward Aleksander Barkov, Trocheck quickly began earning more on-ice responsibility and was moved to the team's top line. Through Barkov's 10-game absence, Trocheck recorded five goals and two assists for seven points. Trocheck played in his 100th NHL game on December 12, 2015, against the Boston Bruins. After scoring six points over three games, Trocheck was recognized as the NHL's Third Star of the Week for the week ending on February 7. The following month, Trocheck was again recognized by the league after recording one goal and five assists over three games. During this period, he also reached the 20-goal mark for the first time in his NHL career. However, shortly after tying Jaromír Jágr for the team lead in goals with 25, Trocheck injured his foot blocking a shot during a game against the Toronto Maple Leafs. He subsequently missed the remainder of the regular season but returned to the Panthers lineup for their 2016 Stanley Cup playoffs run. Trocheck made his postseason debut in Game 5 of the Panthers first-round series against the New York Islanders. He began the game centering the Panther's third-line before reuniting with his usual linemates in the second period. Although he earned an assist in Game 6, the Panthers fell to the Islanders in double overtime and were subsequently eliminated from playoff contention.

As a restricted free agent heading into the 2016 offseason, Trocheck signed a six-year, $28.5 million contract with the Panthers on July 3, 2016. Following the signing of his contract, Trocheck represented Team North America at the 2016 World Cup of Hockey. During the Panthers 2016 training camp, Trocheck spoke highly about his fitness level and said that playing in the World Cup helped him remain in shape. In the first year of his contract, Trocheck surpassed his previous career highs in assists and points while playing in all 82 games. Part of the reason for this increase in production was because injuries to key forwards Barkov and Jonathan Huberdeau resulted in Trocheck being given more on-ice responsibilities and ice time. By January, Trocheck had scored a team-leading 12 goals and 12 assists through 42 games and was selected to participate in the 2017 NHL All-Star Game. He finished the season with 23 goals and 31 assists for 54 points through 82 games. Although he led the team in points, Trocheck and the Panthers failed to qualify for the 2017 Stanley Cup playoffs.

During the 2017–18 season, Trocheck experienced another breakout campaign and set new career highs in goals, assists, and points. Following the departure of Trocheck's usual linemates Reilly Smith and Jussi Jokinen in the offseason, head coach Bob Boughner tried numerous different players as his second-line wingers. Despite this lack of consistency, Trocheck quickly amassed four goals and seven assists through the team's first 10 games. Trocheck's lack of regular wingers remained an issue for the Panthers through the first half of the season. Over the team's first 27 games, Trocheck played alongside 11 different linemate combinations. However, this did not slow Trocheck's scoring and by early December, he led the team with 10 goals and ranked third with 24 points. Throughout the month of December, wingers Denis Malgin and Evgenii Dadonov became mainstays on the second line with Trocheck. On February 13, 2018, Trocheck recorded his first career NHL hat-trick in a 7–5 win over the Edmonton Oilers.

Trocheck's 2018–19 season with shortened to only 55 games due to an ankle injury in early November. During a game against the Ottawa Senators on November 19, Trocheck twisted his right leg while chasing the puck in the first period and was subsequently stretchered off the ice. Following surgery, Trocheck returned to the roster after missing only 27 games. However, he later admitted that he returned too early and had not properly healed.

Trocheck participated in the Panthers 2019 training camp with new wingers Mike Hoffman and Brett Connolly. During a road game against the Nashville Predators, eight games into the season, Trocheck injured his left ankle after blocking a slapshot. At the time of the injury, he had recorded one goal and five assists while centring the Panthers’ second line. He missed seven games to recover from this injury and returned to the Florida lineup in November. After going pointless to start December, Trocheck was moved to the winger position alongside Aleksander Barkov and Jonathan Huberdeau in an effort to spark his offensive abilities.

==== Carolina Hurricanes (2020–2022) ====
As his production continued to decline, Trocheck was traded to the Carolina Hurricanes in exchange for Erik Haula, Lucas Wallmark, Eetu Luostarinen and Chase Priskie on February 24, 2020. At the time of the trade, Trocheck had recorded 10 goals and 26 assists through 55 games. He scored his first goal with the Hurricanes in his fifth game to end the team's four-game winless streak. Following this, the Hurricanes won their next three consecutive games before the NHL regular season was cancelled due to the COVID-19 pandemic. On May 26, the NHL announced their return to play plan to complete the 2019–20 postseason. They modified the Stanley Cup playoffs usual format so teams competed in a unique conference-based playoff tournament based on their points percentage when the regular season was suspended. As a result of this new format, Trocheck and the Hurricanes competed against the New York Rangers in the best-of-5 qualifying series in Toronto. The Hurricanes swept the Rangers in three games to become the first team to make it past the Qualifiers and into the Eastern Conference first round. They then faced the Boston Bruins in the first round and were subsequently eliminated in five games.

Due to the COVID-19 pandemic, the 2020–21 season was pushed back until January 13, 2021, for a 56-game regular season. Trocheck and the Hurricanes were also temporarily realigned into the Central Division where they would only compete against seven other teams.

==== New York Rangers (2022–2026) ====
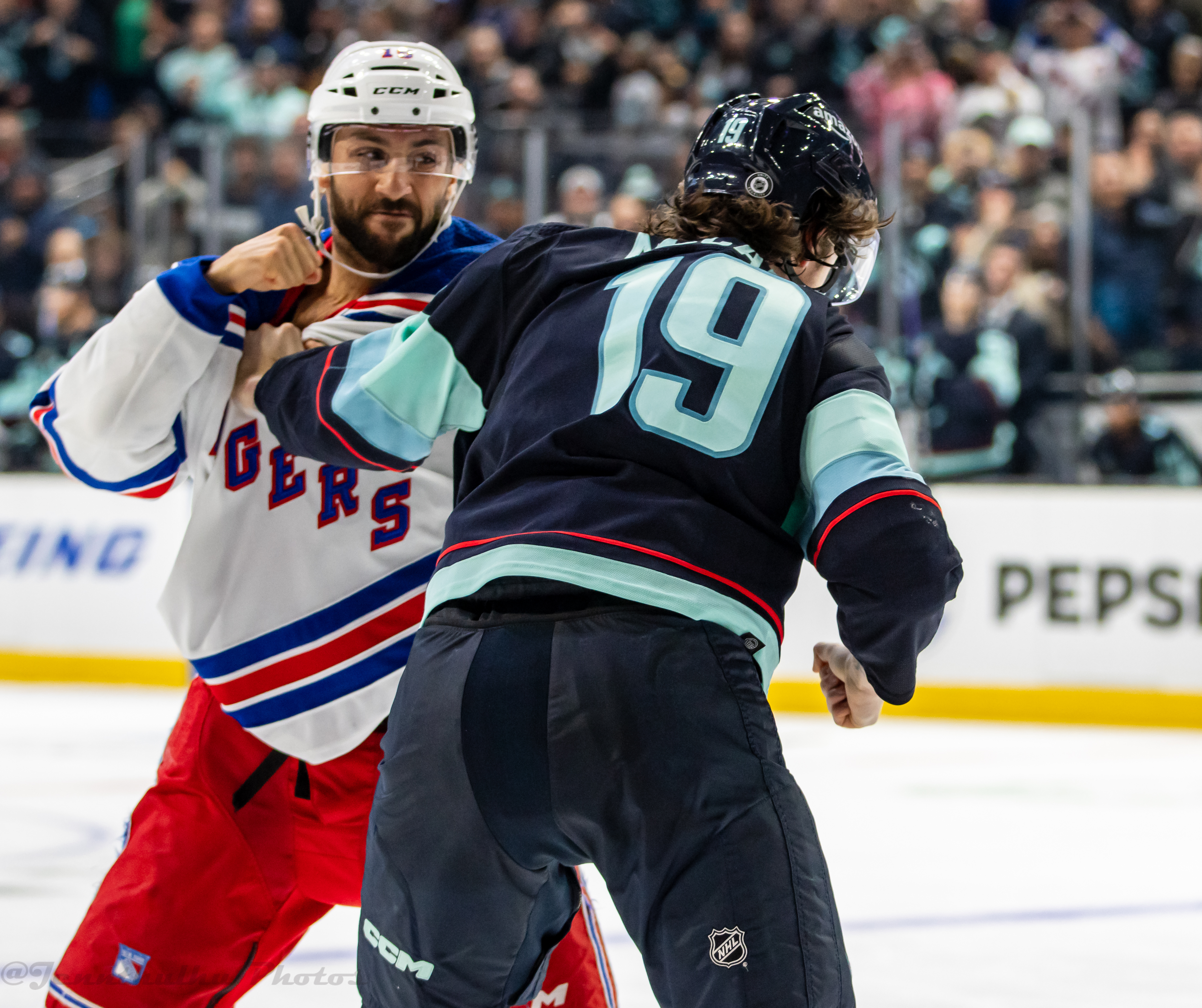
Trocheck (left) fighting Jared McCann during a game against the Seattle Kraken in 2023.

Following his career-best season, Trocheck signed a seven-year, $39.375 million contract with the New York Rangers on July 13, 2022. In the first year of his new contract, Trocheck accumulated 22 goals and 42 assists through 82 games.

During the 2023–24 season, Trocheck experienced another breakout campaign and set new career highs in goals, assists, and points. The league recognized his efforts by naming him to the 2024 NHL All-Star Game. He finished the regular season with a career-high 25 goals and 50 assists for 75 points through 77 games. Trocheck was subsequently recognised by the Rangers with their Steven McDonald Extra Effort Award. In the 2024 Stanley Cup playoffs, Trocheck and the Rangers went undefeated through their first seven games. After sweeping the Washington Capitals, the Rangers won the first three games of their second-round series against the Carolina Hurricanes. In Game 2, Trocheck recorded his first career playoff overtime goal and matched the franchise record for the longest goal streak in playoff history. Although Rangers' undefeated run would end in Game 4, they advanced to the Eastern Conference Finals against the Florida Panthers. Throughout the first two series, Trocheck earned praise from hockey pundits for his playmaking abilities and was referred to as the "Rangers' do-it-all hero" by sportswriter Greg Wyshynski. Trocheck scored the first goal for the Rangers in the Eastern Conference Finals and finished the series with eight goals and 12 assists for 20 points.

==== Utah Mammoth (2026–present) ====
On July 1, 2026, Trocheck was traded to the Utah Mammoth in exchange for Sean Durzi, prospect Cole Beaudoin, and a 2027 third-round pick.

== International play ==
Medal record

Men's ice hockey

Representing the United States

Olympic Games
| Gold medal – first place | 2026 Milano Cortina | |

World Junior Championships
| Gold medal – first place | 2013 Ufa | |

As a citizen of the United States, Trocheck has represented his home country at both the junior and senior levels. He first represented Team USA's U18 team during the 2010 Ivan Hlinka Memorial Tournament, where he helped them win a silver medal. Following this tournament, Trocheck represented the United States men's national junior ice hockey team in the 2013 World Junior Championships. During the tournament, Trocheck tallied three goals and three assists for six points en route to a gold medal.

Trocheck was named to Team USA's senior team the following year to compete at the 2014 IIHF World Championship. Trocheck went pointless over seven games as Team USA failed to medal in the tournament. On September 2, 2016, it was announced that Trocheck would compete for Team North America in the 2016 World Cup of Hockey as a replacement for Sean Monahan. Team North America consisted of players from both Canada and the United States who were under 23 years of age. He scored one goal in three games in the tournament.

On January 2, 2026, he was named to Team USA's roster for the 2026 Winter Olympics.

== Personal life ==
Trocheck is of Italian descent as his grandmother was born and raised in Calabria, Italy. Trocheck and his wife Hillary have two children together. In October 2015, Trocheck signed a multi-year agreement with equipment manufacturer STX.

Amid online backlash faced by the men's Olympic hockey team regarding the inclusion of FBI director Kash Patel during their gold medal celebrations and members of the team laughing at President Trump's comments of being impeached if he did not invite the women's team to the White House, Trocheck was among the majority who visited with the president and attended the State of the Union.

== Career statistics ==
=== Regular season and playoffs ===
| | | | Regular season | | | | | Playoffs |
| Season | Team | League | GP | G | A | Pts | PIM | GP | G | A | Pts | PIM |
|---|---|---|---|---|---|---|---|---|---|---|---|---|
| 2008–09 | Detroit Little Caesars 18U AAA | MWEHL | 44 | 27 | 19 | 46 | 32 | 7 | 1 | 4 | 5 | 0 |
| 2009–10 | Saginaw Spirit | OHL | 68 | 15 | 28 | 43 | 56 | 6 | 2 | 2 | 4 | 2 |
| 2010–11 | Saginaw Spirit | OHL | 68 | 26 | 36 | 62 | 60 | 12 | 6 | 5 | 11 | 4 |
| 2011–12 | Saginaw Spirit | OHL | 65 | 29 | 56 | 85 | 65 | 12 | 5 | 6 | 11 | 10 |
| 2012–13 | Saginaw Spirit | OHL | 35 | 24 | 26 | 50 | 34 | — | — | — | — | — |
| 2012–13 | Plymouth Whalers | OHL | 28 | 26 | 33 | 59 | 24 | 15 | 10 | 14 | 24 | 8 |
| 2013–14 | San Antonio Rampage | AHL | 55 | 16 | 26 | 42 | 32 | — | — | — | — | — |
| 2013–14 | Florida Panthers | NHL | 20 | 5 | 3 | 8 | 6 | — | — | — | — | — |
| 2014–15 | San Antonio Rampage | AHL | 23 | 8 | 11 | 19 | 19 | 3 | 1 | 1 | 2 | 2 |
| 2014–15 | Florida Panthers | NHL | 50 | 7 | 15 | 22 | 24 | — | — | — | — | — |
| 2015–16 | Florida Panthers | NHL | 76 | 25 | 28 | 53 | 44 | 2 | 0 | 1 | 1 | 0 |
| 2016–17 | Florida Panthers | NHL | 82 | 23 | 31 | 54 | 43 | — | — | — | — | — |
| 2017–18 | Florida Panthers | NHL | 82 | 31 | 44 | 75 | 54 | — | — | — | — | — |
| 2018–19 | Florida Panthers | NHL | 55 | 10 | 24 | 34 | 54 | — | — | — | — | — |
| 2019–20 | Florida Panthers | NHL | 55 | 10 | 26 | 36 | 33 | — | — | — | — | — |
| 2019–20 | Carolina Hurricanes | NHL | 7 | 1 | 1 | 2 | 16 | 8 | 0 | 2 | 2 | 4 |
| 2020–21 | Carolina Hurricanes | NHL | 47 | 17 | 26 | 43 | 20 | 9 | 2 | 1 | 3 | 4 |
| 2021–22 | Carolina Hurricanes | NHL | 81 | 21 | 30 | 51 | 78 | 14 | 6 | 4 | 10 | 10 |
| 2022–23 | New York Rangers | NHL | 82 | 22 | 42 | 64 | 58 | 7 | 1 | 0 | 1 | 14 |
| 2023–24 | New York Rangers | NHL | 82 | 25 | 52 | 77 | 55 | 16 | 8 | 12 | 20 | 10 |
| 2024–25 | New York Rangers | NHL | 82 | 26 | 33 | 59 | 44 | — | — | — | — | — |
| 2025–26 | New York Rangers | NHL | 67 | 16 | 37 | 53 | 64 | — | — | — | — | — |
| NHL totals | | | 868 | 239 | 392 | 631 | 593 | 56 | 17 | 20 | 37 | 42 |

=== International ===
| Year | Team | Event | Result | GP | G | A | Pts | PIM |
|---|---|---|---|---|---|---|---|---|
| 2010 | United States | IH18 | 2nd place, silver medalist(s) | 5 | 1 | 1 | 2 | 12 |
| 2013 | United States | WJC | 1st place, gold medalist(s) | 7 | 3 | 3 | 6 | 10 |
| 2014 | United States | WC | 6th | 7 | 0 | 0 | 0 | 4 |
| 2016 | Team North America | WCH | 5th | 3 | 1 | 0 | 1 | 2 |
| 2025 | United States | 4NF | 2nd | 4 | 0 | 0 | 0 | 4 |
| 2026 | United States | OG | 1st place, gold medalist(s) | 6 | 0 | 3 | 3 | 2 |
| Junior totals | | | | 12 | 4 | 4 | 8 | 22 |
| Senior totals | | | | 20 | 1 | 3 | 4 | 12 |

== Awards and honors ==
| Award | Year | Ref |
OHL
| CHL Top Prospects Game | 2011 | |
| First All-Star Team | 2013 | |
| Eddie Powers Memorial Trophy | 2013 | |
| Red Tilson Trophy | 2013 | |
NHL
| All-Star Game | 2017, 2024 | |
New York Rangers
| Steven McDonald Extra Effort Award | 2024 | |
