= 2023–24 New York Rangers season =

National Hockey League season

2023–24 New York Rangers
- Presidents' Trophy winners
- Metropolitan Division champions
- Division: 1st Metropolitan
- Conference: 1st Eastern
- 2023–24 record: 55–23–4
- Home record: 30–11–0
- Road record: 25–12–4
- Goals for: 282
- Goals against: 229

Team information
- General manager: Chris Drury
- Coach: Peter Laviolette
- Captain: Jacob Trouba
- Alternate captains: Adam Fox; Barclay Goodrow; Chris Kreider; Artemi Panarin; Mika Zibanejad
- Arena: Madison Square Garden
- Average attendance: 17,983
- Minor league affiliates: Hartford Wolf Pack (AHL); Cincinnati Cyclones (ECHL)

Team leaders
- Goals: Artemi Panarin (49)
- Assists: Artemi Panarin (71)
- Points: Artemi Panarin (120)
- Penalty minutes: Barclay Goodrow (78)
- Plus/minus: Ryan Lindgren (+22)
- Wins: Igor Shesterkin (36)
- Goals against average: Louis Domingue (1.00)

The 2023–24 New York Rangers season was the franchise's 97th season of play and their 98th season overall.

During the off-season, Peter Laviolette was named head coach on June 13, 2023, after Gerard Gallant resigned at the end of the 2022–23 season.

On December 3, the Rangers earned their 3,000th NHL regular season win in franchise history after a 6–5 victory over the San Jose Sharks.

The Rangers participated in the 2024 NHL Stadium Series at MetLife Stadium in East Rutherford, New Jersey, where they played against the New York Islanders on February 18, 2024, winning the game 6–5 in overtime.

The Rangers' season featured long-term injuries to two players. Center Filip Chytil was injured in a game against the Carolina Hurricanes on November 2, 2023. After nearly three months of rehabilitation, including three weeks in his native Czech Republic, Chytil was ruled out by the Rangers for the remainder of the season on January 28, 2024. Additionally, forward Blake Wheeler was ruled out for the remainder of the regular season on February 16, after suffering a lower-body injury against the Montreal Canadiens the previous day.

With a 2–1 win over the Philadelphia Flyers on February 24, the Rangers won their 10th consecutive game, tying a franchise record reached in the 1939–40 and 1972–73 seasons.

On February 28, the Rangers became the first team in the NHL to reach 40 wins in the 2023–24 season in a 4–1 victory against the Columbus Blue Jackets. On March 26, the Rangers became the first team to clinch a spot in the 2024 Stanley Cup playoffs following a 6–5 overtime win against the Flyers. On April 13, the Rangers defeated the Islanders 3–2 in a shootout to win their 54th game, setting the record for most regular season wins in franchise history. In their final regular season game on April 15, the Rangers clinched both the Presidents' Trophy and the Metropolitan Division title with a 4–0 win over the Ottawa Senators. They also set single-season franchise records with 55 wins and 114 points.

In the first round of the playoffs, the Rangers swept the Washington Capitals in four games, which was the first series sweep for the Rangers since the 2007 playoffs, when they swept the Atlanta Thrashers in the conference quarterfinals. The Rangers became the first team to start 7–0 in the Stanley Cup playoffs since the 2007–08 Pittsburgh Penguins after winning the first three games of their second round series against the Carolina Hurricanes. After losing the fourth and fifth games, the Rangers eliminated the Hurricanes in the sixth game. In the conference finals, they lost in six games to the eventual Stanley Cup champion Florida Panthers.

They became the first Presidents' Trophy team in nearly a decade to move past the second round since the 2014–15 New York Rangers.

== Standings ==
=== Divisional standings ===
Metropolitan Division
Pos	Team	GP	W	L	OTL	RW	GF	GA	GD	Pts
1	p – New York Rangers	82	55	23	4	43	282	229	+53	114
2	x – Carolina Hurricanes	82	52	23	7	44	279	216	+63	111
3	x – New York Islanders	82	39	27	16	29	246	263	−17	94
4	x – Washington Capitals	82	40	31	11	32	220	257	−37	91
5	Pittsburgh Penguins	82	38	32	12	32	255	251	+4	88
6	Philadelphia Flyers	82	38	33	11	30	235	261	−26	87
7	New Jersey Devils	82	38	39	5	33	264	283	−19	81
8	Columbus Blue Jackets	82	27	43	12	21	237	300	−63	66

Source: National Hockey League
Rules for classification: 1) Fewer number of games played (GP, only during regular season); 2) Greater number of regulation wins (RW); 3) Greater number of wins in regulation and overtime, excluding shootout wins (ROW); 4) Greater number of total wins, including shootouts (W); 5) Greater number of points earned in head-to-head play; if teams played an uneven number of head-to-head games, the result of the first game on the home ice of the team with the extra home game is discarded; 6) Greater goal differential (GD); 7) Greater number of goals scored (GF)
p – Clinched Presidents' Trophy; x – Clinched playoff spot

=== Conference standings ===
Eastern Conference Wild Card
Pos	Div	Team	GP	W	L	OTL	RW	GF	GA	GD	Pts
1	AT	x – Tampa Bay Lightning	82	45	29	8	37	291	268	+23	98
2	ME	x – Washington Capitals	82	40	31	11	32	220	257	−37	91
3	AT	Detroit Red Wings	82	41	32	9	27	278	274	+4	91
4	ME	Pittsburgh Penguins	82	38	32	12	32	255	251	+4	88
5	ME	Philadelphia Flyers	82	38	33	11	30	235	261	−26	87
6	AT	Buffalo Sabres	82	39	37	6	33	246	244	+2	84
7	ME	New Jersey Devils	82	38	39	5	33	264	283	−19	81
8	AT	Ottawa Senators	82	37	41	4	25	255	281	−26	78
9	AT	Montreal Canadiens	82	30	36	16	20	236	289	−53	76
10	ME	Columbus Blue Jackets	82	27	43	12	21	237	300	−63	66

Source: National Hockey League
Rules for classification: 1) Fewer number of games played (GP, only during regular season); 2) Greater number of regulation wins (RW); 3) Greater number of wins in regulation and overtime, excluding shootout wins (ROW); 4) Greater number of total wins, including shootouts (W); 5) Greater number of points earned in head-to-head play; if teams played an uneven number of head-to-head games, the result of the first game on the home ice of the team with the extra home game is discarded; 6) Greater goal differential (GD); 7) Greater number of goals scored (GF)
x – Clinched playoff spot

== Schedule and results ==
=== Preseason ===
The preseason schedule was published on June 22, 2023.

2023 preseason game log: 1–5–0 (home: 1–2–0; road: 0–3–0)

Game	Date	Opponent	Score	OT	Decision	Location	Attendance	Record	Recap
1	September 24	@ Boston	0–3		Quick	TD Garden	17,565	0–1–0	
2	September 26	NY Islanders	4–2		Shesterkin	Madison Square Garden	16,643	1–1–0	
3	September 28	New Jersey	2–3		Domingue	Madison Square Garden	16,310	1–2–0	
—	September 29	@ NY Islanders	–	Postponed due to flooding in the New York metropolitan area; moved to September 30					
4	September 30	@ NY Islanders	3–5		Quick	UBS Arena	12,940	1–3–0	
5	October 4	@ New Jersey	2–5		Quick	Prudential Center	14,028	1–4–0	
6	October 5	Boston	1–3		Shesterkin	Madison Square Garden	17,273	1–5–0	

=== Regular season ===
The regular season schedule was published on June 27, 2023.

2023–24 game log
October: 7–2–0, 14 points (home: 1–1–0; road: 6–1–0)

Game	Date	Opponent	Score	OT	Decision	Location	Attendance	Record	Points	Recap
1	October 12	@ Buffalo	5–1		Shesterkin	KeyBank Center	19,070	1–0–0	2	
2	October 14	@ Columbus	3–5		Shesterkin	Nationwide Arena	16,520	1–1–0	2	
3	October 16	Arizona	2–1		Shesterkin	Madison Square Garden	18,006	2–1–0	4	
4	October 19	Nashville	1–4		Shesterkin	Madison Square Garden	18,006	2–2–0	4	
5	October 21	@ Seattle	4–1		Quick	Climate Pledge Arena	17,151	3–2–0	6	
6	October 24	@ Calgary	3–1		Shesterkin	Scotiabank Saddledome	16,800	4–2–0	8	
7	October 26	@ Edmonton	3–0		Quick	Rogers Place	17,939	5–2–0	10	
8	October 28	@ Vancouver	4–3	OT	Shesterkin	Rogers Arena	18,483	6–2–0	12	
9	October 30	@ Winnipeg	3–2	OT	Shesterkin	Canada Life Centre	11,898	7–2–0	14	

November: 9–2–1, 19 points (home: 6–1–0; road: 3–1–1)

Game	Date	Opponent	Score	OT	Decision	Location	Attendance	Record	Points	Recap
10	November 2	Carolina	2–1		Shesterkin	Madison Square Garden	18,006	8–2–0	16	
11	November 4	@ Minnesota	4–5	SO	Quick	Xcel Energy Center	18,678	8–2–1	17	
12	November 7	Detroit	5–3		Quick	Madison Square Garden	18,006	9–2–1	19	
13	November 9	Minnesota	4–1		Domingue	Madison Square Garden	18,006	10–2–1	21	
14	November 12	Columbus	4–3	SO	Quick	Madison Square Garden	18,006	11–2–1	23	
15	November 18	@ New Jersey	5–3		Shesterkin	Prudential Center	17,086	12–2–1	25	
16	November 20	@ Dallas	3–6		Shesterkin	American Airlines Center	18,532	12–3–1	25	
17	November 22	@ Pittsburgh	1–0		Quick	PPG Paints Arena	18,250	13–3–1	27	
18	November 24	@ Philadelphia	3–1		Shesterkin	Wells Fargo Center	19,032	14–3–1	29	
19	November 25	Boston	7–4		Quick	Madison Square Garden	18,006	15–3–1	31	
20	November 27	Buffalo	1–5		Shesterkin	Madison Square Garden	18,006	15–4–1	31	
21	November 29	Detroit	3–2		Shesterkin	Madison Square Garden	18,006	16–4–1	33	

December: 9–5–0, 18 points (home: 5–2–0; road: 4–3–0)

Game	Date	Opponent	Score	OT	Decision	Location	Attendance	Record	Points	Recap
22	December 2	@ Nashville	4–3		Shesterkin	Bridgestone Arena	17,341	17–4–1	35	
23	December 3	San Jose	6–5		Quick	Madison Square Garden	18,006	18–4–1	37	
24	December 5	@ Ottawa	2–6		Shesterkin	Canadian Tire Centre	17,362	18–5–1	37	
25	December 9	@ Washington	0–4		Shesterkin	Capital One Arena	18,573	18–6–1	37	
26	December 10	Los Angeles	4–1		Quick	Madison Square Garden	18,006	19–6–1	39	
27	December 12	Toronto	3–7		Shesterkin	Madison Square Garden	18,006	19–7–1	39	
28	December 15	Anaheim	5–1		Quick	Madison Square Garden	18,006	20–7–1	41	
29	December 16	@ Boston	2–1	OT	Shesterkin	TD Garden	17,850	21–7–1	43	
30	December 19	@ Toronto	5–2		Shesterkin	Scotiabank Arena	19,264	22–7–1	45	
31	December 22	Edmonton	3–4		Quick	Madison Square Garden	18,006	22–8–1	45	
32	December 23	Buffalo	4–3	OT	Shesterkin	Madison Square Garden	18,006	23–8–1	47	
33	December 27	Washington	5–1		Shesterkin	Madison Square Garden	18,006	24–8–1	49	
34	December 29	@ Florida	3–4		Quick	Amerant Bank Arena	19,723	24–9–1	49	
35	December 30	@ Tampa Bay	5–1		Shesterkin	Amalie Arena	19,092	25–9–1	51	

January: 5–7–2, 12 points (home: 3–3–0; road: 2–4–2)

Game	Date	Opponent	Score	OT	Decision	Location	Attendance	Record	Points	Recap
36	January 2	Carolina	1–6		Shesterkin	Madison Square Garden	18,006	25–10–1	51	
37	January 4	Chicago	4–1		Shesterkin	Madison Square Garden	18,006	26–10–1	53	
38	January 6	@ Montreal	3–4	SO	Quick	Bell Centre	21,105	26–10–2	54	
39	January 8	Vancouver	3–6		Shesterkin	Madison Square Garden	18,006	26–11–2	54	
40	January 11	@ St. Louis	2–5		Shesterkin	Enterprise Center	18,096	26–12–2	54	
41	January 13	@ Washington	2–3		Quick	Capital One Arena	18,573	26–13–2	54	
42	January 14	Washington	2–1		Shesterkin	Madison Square Garden	18,006	27–13–2	56	
43	January 16	Seattle	5–2		Shesterkin	Madison Square Garden	18,006	28–13–2	58	
44	January 18	@ Vegas	1–5		Shesterkin	T-Mobile Arena	18,149	28–14–2	58	
45	January 20	@ Los Angeles	1–2		Quick	Crypto.com Arena	18,292	28–15–2	58	
46	January 21	@ Anaheim	5–2		Shesterkin	Honda Center	16,197	29–15–2	60	
47	January 23	@ San Jose	2–3	OT	Shesterkin	SAP Center	12,892	29–15–3	61	
48	January 26	Vegas	2–5		Shesterkin	Madison Square Garden	18,006	29–16–3	61	
49	January 27	@ Ottawa	7–2		Quick	Canadian Tire Centre	19,262	30–16–3	63	

February: 10–1–0, 20 points (home: 6–0–0; road: 4–1–0)

Game	Date	Opponent	Score	OT	Decision	Location	Attendance	Record	Points	Recap
50	February 5	Colorado	2–1	OT	Quick	Madison Square Garden	18,006	31–16–3	65	
51	February 7	Tampa Bay	3–1		Quick	Madison Square Garden	17,208	32–16–3	67	
52	February 9	@ Chicago	4–3	OT	Shesterkin	United Center	19,995	33–16–3	69	
53	February 12	Calgary	2–0		Shesterkin	Madison Square Garden	18,006	34–16–3	71	
54	February 15	Montreal	7–4		Quick	Madison Square Garden	18,006	35–16–3	73	
55	February 18	@ NY Islanders	6–5	OT	Shesterkin	MetLife Stadium	79,690 (outdoors)	36–16–3	75	
56	February 20	Dallas	3–1		Shesterkin	Madison Square Garden	18,006	37–16–3	77	
57	February 22	@ New Jersey	5–1		Shesterkin	Prudential Center	16,650	38–16–3	79	
58	February 24	@ Philadelphia	2–1		Shesterkin	Wells Fargo Center	19,756	39–16–3	81	
59	February 25	@ Columbus	2–4		Quick	Nationwide Arena	18,293	39–17–3	81	
60	February 28	Columbus	4–1		Shesterkin	Madison Square Garden	18,006	40–17–3	83	

March: 10–3–1, 21 points (home: 5–2–0; road: 5–1–1)

Game	Date	Opponent	Score	OT	Decision	Location	Attendance	Record	Points	Recap
61	March 2	@ Toronto	3–4	SO	Shesterkin	Scotiabank Arena	19,312	40–17–4	84	
62	March 4	Florida	2–4		Shesterkin	Madison Square Garden	18,006	40–18–4	84	
63	March 9	St. Louis	4–0		Shesterkin	Madison Square Garden	18,006	41–18–4	86	
64	March 11	New Jersey	3–1		Quick	Madison Square Garden	18,006	42–18–4	88	
65	March 12	@ Carolina	1–0		Shesterkin	PNC Arena	18,859	43–18–4	90	
66	March 14	@ Tampa Bay	3–6		Shesterkin	Amalie Arena	19,092	43–19–4	90	
67	March 16	@ Pittsburgh	7–4		Quick	PPG Paints Arena	17,811	44–19–4	92	
68	March 17	NY Islanders	5–2		Shesterkin	Madison Square Garden	18,006	45–19–4	94	
69	March 19	Winnipeg	2–4		Shesterkin	Madison Square Garden	18,006	45–20–4	94	
70	March 21	@ Boston	5–2		Quick	TD Garden	17,850	46–20–4	96	
71	March 23	Florida	4–3	SO	Shesterkin	Madison Square Garden	18,006	47–20–4	98	
72	March 26	Philadelphia	6–5	OT	Shesterkin	Madison Square Garden	18,006	48–20–4	100	
73	March 28	@ Colorado	3–2	SO	Shesterkin	Ball Arena	18,130	49–20–4	102	
74	March 30	@ Arizona	8–5		Quick	Mullett Arena	4,600	50–20–4	104	

April: 5–3–0, 10 points (home: 4–2–0; road: 1–1–0)

Game	Date	Opponent	Score	OT	Decision	Location	Attendance	Record	Points	Recap
75	April 1	Pittsburgh	2–5		Shesterkin	Madison Square Garden	18,006	50–21–4	104	
76	April 3	New Jersey	4–3		Shesterkin	Madison Square Garden	18,006	51–21–4	106	
77	April 5	@ Detroit	4–3		Quick	Little Caesars Arena	19,515	52–21–4	108	
78	April 7	Montreal	5–2		Shesterkin	Madison Square Garden	17,854	53–21–4	110	
79	April 9	@ NY Islanders	2–4		Shesterkin	UBS Arena	17,255	53–22–4	110	
80	April 11	Philadelphia	1–4		Quick	Madison Square Garden	18,006	53–23–4	110	
81	April 13	NY Islanders	3–2	SO	Shesterkin	Madison Square Garden	18,006	54–23–4	112	
82	April 15	Ottawa	4–0		Shesterkin	Madison Square Garden	18,006	55–23–4	114	

Win (2 points) Loss (0 points) Overtime/shootout loss (1 point)

=== Playoffs ===
The Rangers faced the Washington Capitals in the first round, winning the series in four games. In the second round, the Rangers met the Carolina Hurricanes, winning the series in six games. The Rangers faced the Florida Panthers in the Eastern Conference finals, losing the series in six games.

2024 Stanley Cup playoffs
Eastern Conference first round vs. (WC2) Washington Capitals: New York won 4–0

Game	Date	Opponent	Score	OT	Decision	Location	Attendance	Series	Recap
1	April 21	Washington	4–1		Shesterkin	Madison Square Garden	18,006	1–0	
2	April 23	Washington	4–3		Shesterkin	Madison Square Garden	18,006	2–0	
3	April 26	@ Washington	3–1		Shesterkin	Capital One Arena	18,573	3–0	
4	April 28	@ Washington	4–2		Shesterkin	Capital One Arena	18,573	4–0	

Eastern Conference second round vs. (M2) Carolina Hurricanes: New York won 4–2

Game	Date	Opponent	Score	OT	Decision	Location	Attendance	Series	Recap
1	May 5	Carolina	4–3		Shesterkin	Madison Square Garden	18,006	1–0	
2	May 7	Carolina	4–3	2OT	Shesterkin	Madison Square Garden	18,006	2–0	
3	May 9	@ Carolina	3–2	OT	Shesterkin	PNC Arena	18,959	3–0	
4	May 11	@ Carolina	3–4		Shesterkin	PNC Arena	19,074	3–1	
5	May 13	Carolina	1–4		Shesterkin	Madison Square Garden	18,006	3–2	
6	May 16	@ Carolina	5–3		Shesterkin	PNC Arena	19,124	4–2	

Eastern Conference finals vs. (A1) Florida Panthers: Florida won 4–2

Game	Date	Opponent	Score	OT	Decision	Location	Attendance	Series	Recap
1	May 22	Florida	0–3		Shesterkin	Madison Square Garden	18,006	0–1	
2	May 24	Florida	2–1	OT	Shesterkin	Madison Square Garden	18,006	1–1	
3	May 26	@ Florida	5–4	OT	Shesterkin	Amerant Bank Arena	19,780	2–1	
4	May 28	@ Florida	2–3	OT	Shesterkin	Amerant Bank Arena	19,754	2–2	
5	May 30	Florida	2–3		Shesterkin	Madison Square Garden	18,006	2–3	
6	June 1	@ Florida	1–2		Shesterkin	Amerant Bank Arena	19,865	2–4	

Win Loss

== Player statistics ==
As of June 1, 2024

=== Skaters ===
Regular season
Player	GP	G	A	Pts	+/−	PIM
Artemi Panarin	82	49	71	120	+18	24
Vincent Trocheck	82	25	52	77	+16	55
Chris Kreider	82	39	36	75	+19	26
Adam Fox	72	17	56	73	+21	36
Mika Zibanejad	81	26	46	72	+15	30
Alexis Lafrenière	82	28	29	57	+2	40
Erik Gustafsson	76	6	25	31	+3	35
K'Andre Miller	80	8	22	30	+5	49
Jimmy Vesey	80	13	13	26	–4	20
Jacob Trouba	69	3	19	22	–4	73
Will Cuylle	81	13	8	21	–3	56
Blake Wheeler	54	9	12	21	+2	23
Kaapo Kakko	61	13	6	19	+6	24
Jonny Brodzinski	57	6	13	19	–3	8
Braden Schneider	82	5	14	19	–1	16
Ryan Lindgren	76	3	14	17	+22	36
Barclay Goodrow	80	4	8	12	–13	78
Zac Jones	31	2	7	9	+1	8
Jack Roslovic^{†}	19	3	5	8	–1	2
Filip Chytil	10	0	6	6	0	4
Alexander Wennberg^{†}	19	1	4	5	–1	0
Nick Bonino	45	1	4	5	–12	8
Tyler Pitlick	34	1	3	4	–6	4
Adam Edström	11	2	0	2	+2	2
Matt Rempe	17	1	1	2	+1	71
Brandon Scanlin	1	0	0	0	0	0
Brennan Othmann	3	0	0	0	0	0
Connor Mackey	1	0	0	0	+1	5
Jake Leschyshyn	1	0	0	0	–1	0
Anton Blidh	1	0	0	0	–1	2
Chad Ruhwedel^{†}	5	0	0	0	–2	0
Riley Nash	1	0	0	0	0	0

Playoffs
Player	GP	G	A	Pts	+/−	PIM
Vincent Trocheck	16	8	12	20	+3	10
Mika Zibanejad	16	3	13	16	+1	2
Artemi Panarin	16	5	10	15	–2	4
Alexis Lafrenière	16	8	6	14	+2	6
Chris Kreider	16	8	4	12	–3	6
Barclay Goodrow	16	6	2	8	+3	12
Jack Roslovic	16	2	6	8	0	6
Adam Fox	16	0	8	8	+5	8
Jacob Trouba	16	1	6	7	0	22
K'Andre Miller	16	1	3	4	+2	8
Jimmy Vesey	12	1	2	3	+1	2
Ryan Lindgren	16	0	3	3	0	6
Erik Gustafsson	16	0	3	3	–3	8
Will Cuylle	16	1	1	2	+3	8
Kaapo Kakko	15	1	1	2	–4	0
Alexander Wennberg	16	1	1	2	–2	4
Braden Schneider	16	0	2	2	0	16
Matt Rempe	11	1	0	1	+2	10
Filip Chytil	6	0	0	0	–3	2
Jonny Brodzinski	3	0	0	0	–1	0
Blake Wheeler	1	0	0	0	0	2

=== Goaltenders ===
Regular season
Player	GP	GS	TOI	W	L	OT	GA	GAA	SA	SV%	SO	G	A	PIM
Igor Shesterkin	55	55	3,277:06	36	17	2	141	2.58	1,607	.913	4	0	1	6
Jonathan Quick	27	26	1,582:44	18	6	2	69	2.62	771	.911	2	0	1	8
Louis Domingue	1	1	60:00	1	0	0	1	1.00	26	.962	0	0	0	0

Playoffs
Player	GP	GS	TOI	W	L	GA	GAA	SA	SV%	SO	G	A	PIM
Igor Shesterkin	16	16	999:51	10	6	39	2.34	524	.927	0	0	0	0

- ^{†} Denotes player spent time with another team before joining the Rangers. Stats reflect time with the Rangers only.
- ^{‡} Denotes player was traded mid-season. Stats reflect time with the Rangers only.
- Bold/italics denotes franchise record.

== Awards and honors ==
=== Awards ===
Regular season
Player	Award	Date
Vincent Trocheck	Steven McDonald Extra Effort Award	April 7, 2024
Adam Fox	Mr. Ranger Award	April 11, 2024
Artemi Panarin	Rangers MVP	April 15, 2024
Jonathan Quick	Players' Player Award	April 15, 2024
Jacob Trouba	Mark Messier Leadership Award	May 14, 2024

=== Milestones ===
Regular season
Player	Milestone	Reached
Igor Shesterkin	100th NHL career win	October 12, 2023
Will Cuylle	1st NHL career goal 1st NHL career point	October 14, 2023
Kaapo Kakko	100th NHL career point	October 21, 2023
Artemi Panarin	600th NHL career game	November 2, 2023
Alexis Lafrenière	1st NHL career three-point game	November 9, 2023
Jonathan Quick	60th NHL career shutout	November 22, 2023
Jacob Trouba	700th NHL career game	November 29, 2023
Tyler Pitlick	400th NHL career game	December 2, 2023
Adam Fox	300th NHL career game	December 9, 2023
Jonny Brodzinski	1st NHL career power play goal	December 10, 2023
Artemi Panarin	700th NHL career point	December 12, 2023
Jacob Trouba	300th NHL career point	December 12, 2023
Adam Edström	1st NHL career game 1st NHL career goal	December 15, 2023
Chris Kreider	500th NHL career point 100th NHL career power play goal	December 15, 2023
Mika Zibanejad	800th NHL career game	December 27, 2023
Brennan Othmann	1st NHL career game	January 4, 2024
Ryan Lindgren	300th NHL career game	January 18, 2024
Adam Fox	2nd NHL career 4-assist game	February 15, 2024
Chris Kreider	6th NHL career hat trick	February 15, 2024
Matt Rempe	1st NHL career game 1st player to make NHL debut in any outdoor game	February 18, 2024
Matt Rempe	1st NHL career goal	February 24, 2024
Igor Shesterkin	200th NHL career game	March 9, 2024
Vincent Trocheck	700th NHL career game	March 9, 2024
Chris Kreider	800th NHL career game	March 16, 2024
Peter Laviolette	800th NHL career coaching win	March 26, 2024
Chris Kreider	300th NHL career goal	March 30, 2024
Alexis Lafrenière	1st NHL career hat trick 1st NHL career five-point game	March 30, 2024
Igor Shesterkin	15th NHL career shutout	April 15, 2024
Matt Rempe	1st NHL career postseason goal	April 21, 2024
K'Andre Miller	1st NHL career short-handed goal	April 23, 2024
Jack Roslovic	1st NHL career postseason goal	April 23, 2024
Chris Kreider	1st NHL career playoff hat trick	May 16, 2024

=== Records ===
Regular season
Player	Record	Reached
Chris Kreider	Tied 4th place in Rangers history for all-time goals (272)	November 2, 2023
Artemi Panarin	Tied 1st place in Rangers history for longest point-streak to start a season (14)	November 12, 2023
Artemi Panarin	1st place in Rangers history for longest point-streak to start a season (15)	November 18, 2023
Artemi Panarin	7th place in Rangers history to record 30-plus points in first 20 games of a season	November 27, 2023
Chris Kreider	Tied 3rd place in Rangers history for all-time goals (280)	December 15, 2023
Chris Kreider	4th place in Rangers history for all-time power play goals (101)	January 4, 2024
Peter Laviolette	783rd NHL career coaching win (7th-most in NHL history, passing Al Arbour for sole possession)	February 5, 2024
Jonathan Quick	386th NHL career win (16th-most in NHL history, passing Mike Vernon for sole possession)	February 5, 2024
Jonathan Quick	389th NHL career win (tied 16th-most in NHL history with Dominik Hasek)	March 11, 2024
Peter Laviolette	1,500th NHL career game coached (9th-most all-time in NHL history)	March 21, 2024
Jonathan Quick	391st NHL career win (tied 15th-most in NHL history with Ryan Miller)	March 21, 2024
Artemi Panarin	First NHL career 100-point season (7th Rangers player in franchise history)	March 26, 2024
Chris Kreider	Tied 3rd place in Rangers history for all-time power play goals (106 with Brian Leetch)	March 28, 2024
Jonathan Quick	392nd NHL career win (15th-most in NHL history, most among American-born goaltenders)	March 30, 2024
Chris Kreider	41st NHL career postseason goal (most in franchise history)	April 21, 2024

== Transactions ==
The Rangers have been involved in the following transactions during the 2023–24 season.

=== Trades ===
Date	Details		Ref
June 29, 2023	To Pittsburgh Penguins 3rd-round pick in 2023; 7th-round pick in 2024	To New York Rangers 3rd-round pick in 2023	
March 6, 2024	To Seattle Kraken 2nd-round pick in 2024; Conditional 4th-round pick in 2025	To New York Rangers Alexander Wennberg	
March 8, 2024	To Columbus Blue Jackets Conditional 4th-round pick in 2026	To New York Rangers Jack Roslovic	
March 8, 2024	To Minnesota Wild Turner Elson	To New York Rangers Nic Petan	
March 8, 2024	To Pittsburgh Penguins 4th-round pick in 2027	To New York Rangers Chad Ruhwedel	

=== Free agents ===
Date	Player	Team	Contract term	Ref
July 1, 2023	Alex Belzile	from Montreal Canadiens	2-year	
July 1, 2023	Nick Bonino	from San Jose Sharks	1-year	
July 1, 2023	Nikolas Brouillard	from San Diego Gulls (AHL)	1-year	
July 1, 2023	Ryan Carpenter	to San Jose Sharks	1-year	
July 1, 2023	Tim Gettinger	to Detroit Red Wings	1-year	
July 1, 2023	Erik Gustafsson	from Toronto Maple Leafs	1-year	
July 1, 2023	Wyatt Kalynuk	to St. Louis Blues	1-year	
July 1, 2023	Connor Mackey	from Arizona Coyotes	1-year	
July 1, 2023	Niko Mikkola	to Florida Panthers	3-year	
July 1, 2023	Riley Nash	from Charlotte Checkers (AHL)	2-year	
July 1, 2023	Tyler Pitlick	from St. Louis Blues	1-year	
July 1, 2023	Jonathan Quick	from Vegas Golden Knights	1-year	
July 1, 2023	Blake Wheeler	from Winnipeg Jets	1-year	
July 2, 2023	Mac Hollowell	from Toronto Maple Leafs	1-year	
July 2, 2023	Will Lockwood	to Florida Panthers	2-year	
July 27, 2023	Vladimir Tarasenko	to Ottawa Senators	1-year	
August 7, 2023	Patrick Khodorenko	to Charlotte Checkers (AHL)	1-year	
September 9, 2023	Tyler Motte	to Tampa Bay Lightning	1-year	
October 17, 2023	Libor Hájek	to Wilkes-Barre/Scranton Penguins (AHL)	1-year	
November 20, 2023	C. J. Smith	to JYP Jyväskylä (Liiga)	1-year	
November 28, 2023	Patrick Kane	to Detroit Red Wings	1-year	
February 15, 2024	Jaroslav Halák	to HC Slovan Bratislava (Slovak Extraliga)	1-year	
June 13, 2024	Karl Henriksson	to Växjö Lakers (SHL)	3-year	
June 14, 2024	Olof Lindbom	to Lahti Pelicans (Liiga)	2-year	

=== Waivers ===
Date	Player	Team	Ref
September 30, 2023	Ty Emberson	to San Jose Sharks	
June 19, 2024	Barclay Goodrow	to San Jose Sharks	

=== Contract terminations ===
Date	Player	Via	Ref
February 7, 2024	Nick Bonino	Mutual termination	

=== Signings ===
Date	Player	Contract term	Ref
July 12, 2023	K'Andre Miller	2-year	
July 13, 2023	Ty Emberson	1-year	
August 2, 2023	Brandon Scanlin	1-year	
August 24, 2023	Alexis Lafrenière	2-year	
February 15, 2024	Brandon Scanlin	2-year	
February 21, 2024	Jonny Brodzinski	2-year	
March 1, 2024	Connor Mackey	2-year	
March 3, 2024	Jonathan Quick	1-year	
March 10, 2024	Louis Domingue	1-year	
March 15, 2024	Hugo Ollas	2-year	
March 20, 2024	Jaroslav Chmelař	3-year	
April 2, 2024	Victor Mancini	2-year	
April 2, 2024	Kalle Väisänen	3-year	
May 20, 2024	Dylan Roobroeck	3-year	
June 13, 2024	Kaapo Kakko	1-year	

== Draft picks ==
Below are the New York Rangers' selections at the 2023 NHL entry draft, which was held on June 28 and 29, 2023, at Bridgestone Arena in Nashville, Tennessee.

Round	#	Player	Pos	Nationality	College/junior/club team
1	23	Gabe Perreault	RW	United States	U.S. NTDP (USHL)
3	90^{1}	Drew Fortescue	D	United States	Boston College (Hockey East)
5	152^{2}	Rasmus Larsson	D	Sweden	Västerås IK U20 (J20 Nationell)
6	178^{3}	Dylan Roobroeck	C	Canada	Oshawa Generals (OHL)
6	183	Ty Henricks	LW	United States	Fargo Force (USHL)

1. The New Jersey Devils's third-round pick went to the New York Rangers as the result of a trade on June 29, 2023, that sent third-round pick in 2023 and seventh-round pick in 2024 to the Pittsburgh Penguins in exchange for this pick.
2. The Edmonton Oilers' fifth-round pick went to the New York Rangers as the result of a trade on May 31, 2023, that sent Jayden Grubbe to Edmonton in exchange for this pick.
3. The Winnipeg Jets' sixth-round pick went to the New York Rangers as the result of a trade on March 21, 2022, that sent Morgan Barron, two conditional second-round picks in 2022 and a fifth-round pick in 2023 to Winnipeg in exchange for Andrew Copp and this pick.
