= Wyatt Johnston =

Canadian ice hockey player (born 2003)

- Born: May 14, 2003 (age 23) Toronto, Ontario, Canada
- Height: 6 ft 1 in (185 cm)
- Weight: 187 lb (85 kg; 13 st 5 lb)
- Position: Centre
- Shoots: Right
- NHL team: Dallas Stars
- NHL draft: 23rd overall, 2021; Dallas Stars
- Playing career: 2022–present

Wyatt Henry Johnston (born May 14, 2003) is a Canadian professional ice hockey player who is a centre for the Dallas Stars of the National Hockey League (NHL). Johnston was selected in the first round of the 2021 NHL entry draft by the Stars with the 23rd overall pick.

== Playing career ==
=== Junior ===
Johnston finished his career with the Toronto Marlboros in the GTHL in 2018–19. He put up 48 goals and 46 assists for 94 points during his final year with the team.

He was drafted sixth overall by the Windsor Spitfires during the 2019 OHL Priority Selection draft. In his rookie season in 2019–20, Johnston scored his first OHL goal on September 21, 2019 against the Peterborough Petes in a 9–6 victory. Johnston went on to score 12 goals and 18 assists for 30 points in 53 games in his rookie year before the season was cancelled due to the COVID-19 pandemic.

In returning to the Windsor Spitfires for the 2021–22 season, Johnston led the league and the entire CHL in scoring in the regular season with 124 points in 68 regular season games. He also led the OHL in playoff points, registering 41 through 25 games, before losing in the finals in a game 7 defeat to the Hamilton Bulldogs.

=== Dallas Stars ===
Johnston was drafted 23rd overall in the first round by the Dallas Stars during the 2021 NHL entry draft. He signed a three-year, entry-level contract with the Stars on September 28, 2021. He put up 2 goals and 1 assist in the Dallas Stars Prospects Tournament.

Johnston made his NHL debut in the Stars' first game of the season on October 13, 2022, against the Nashville Predators. He became the first teenager to play for the Stars since Miro Heiskanen in 2018 and the first North American teenager to do so since 1994 (Jamie Langenbrunner and Todd Harvey). Johnston scored his first NHL goal in his first NHL game against Juuse Saros. On March 4, 2023, Johnston broke the record for most goals by a teenager in Stars' history when he scored his 15th goal of the season (and his career) against the Colorado Avalanche. Johnston finished the season with 24 goals and 17 assists for 41 points in 82 games.

On March 5, 2024, Johnston scored his first career hat-trick in a 7–6 win against the San Jose Sharks.

On January 28, 2025, Johnston became the youngest player in franchise history to score a natural hat-trick in a game against Vegas.

== Personal life ==
Johnston was born in Toronto, Ontario on May 14, 2003, to Margot Fulcher and Chuck Johnston. He has two older siblings, Austin and Quinn. Growing up in Toronto, Wyatt attended Glenview Senior Public School for his middle school years. In high school, he attended Lawrence Park Collegiate Institute. During his rookie season with the Dallas Stars, Johnston lived in the house of teammate Joe Pavelski.

== Career statistics ==
=== Regular season and playoffs ===
Bold indicates led league

			Regular season					Playoffs
Season	Team	League	GP	G	A	Pts	PIM	GP	G	A	Pts	PIM
2018–19	Toronto Marlboros	U16 AAA	73	48	46	94	8	—	—	—	—	—
2018–19	Toronto Marlboros	GTHL U16	33	23	13	36	4	—	—	—	—	—
2019–20	Windsor Spitfires	OHL	53	12	18	30	8	—	—	—	—	—
2021–22	Windsor Spitfires	OHL	68	46	78	**124**	26	25	14	**27**	**41**	12
2022–23	Dallas Stars	NHL	82	24	17	41	20	19	4	2	6	4
2023–24	Dallas Stars	NHL	82	32	33	65	38	19	10	6	16	2
2024–25	Dallas Stars	NHL	82	33	38	71	14	18	4	6	10	6
2025–26	Dallas Stars	NHL	82	45	41	86	32	6	4	2	6	2
NHL totals			328	134	129	263	104	62	22	16	38	14

Medal record

Representing Canada

Ice hockey

World U18 Championships
Gold medal – first place	2021 United States	

=== International ===
Year	Team	Event	Result	GP	G	A	Pts	PIM
2019	Canada Red	U17	5th	5	2	3	5	14
2021	Canada	U18	1st place, gold medalist(s)	7	2	2	4	4
Junior totals				12	4	5	9	18

== Awards and honours ==
Award	Year
OHL
First All-Star Team	2022
Red Tilson Trophy	2022
Eddie Powers Memorial Trophy	2022
William Hanley Trophy	2022
CHL Top Scorer Award (124)	2022
NHL
NHL All-Rookie Team	2023

Awards and achievements
Preceded by Mavrik Bourque	Dallas Stars first-round draft pick 2021	Succeeded by Lian Bichsel
