= 2023–24 Los Angeles Kings season =

National Hockey League season

2023–24 Los Angeles Kings
- Division: 3rd Pacific
- Conference: 7th Western
- 2023–24 record: 44–27–11
- Home record: 22–12–7
- Road record: 22–15–4
- Goals for: 256
- Goals against: 215

Team information
- General manager: Rob Blake
- Coach: Todd McLellan (Oct. 11 – Feb. 2); Jim Hiller (interim, Feb. 2 – pres.)
- Captain: Anze Kopitar
- Alternate captains: Phillip Danault; Drew Doughty
- Arena: Crypto.com Arena
- Average attendance: 17,940
- Minor league affiliates: Ontario Reign (AHL); Greenville Swamp Rabbits (ECHL)

Team leaders
- Goals: Trevor Moore (31)
- Assists: Adrian Kempe (47)
- Points: Adrian Kempe (75)
- Penalty minutes: Andreas Englund (81)
- Plus/minus: Mikey Anderson (+22)
- Wins: Cam Talbot (27)
- Goals against average: David Rittich (2.15)

The 2023–24 Los Angeles Kings season was the 57th season (56th season of play) for the National Hockey League (NHL) franchise that was established on June 5, 1967.

This season was the first full-season without longtime goaltender and Conn Smythe Trophy winner Jonathan Quick, who was traded on March 1, 2023, to the Columbus Blue Jackets; the Blue Jackets traded Quick to the Vegas Golden Knights the following day.

For the first time since the 2016–17 season, Anze Kopitar did not finish as the team's leading scorer in either goals or points, in addition to not leading in assists since his rookie season in 2006–07.

Following their December 7, 2023, 4–0 win against the Montreal Canadiens, the Kings set the opening road wins record at 11–0–0. On February 2, 2024, the Kings fired head coach Todd McLellan, and named his assistant Jim Hiller as interim head coach. On April 11, the Kings clinched a playoff berth for the third consecutive season after a 4–1 win against the Calgary Flames. In the playoffs, the Kings were eliminated by the Edmonton Oilers for the third consecutive year, losing in five games.

== Standings ==
=== Divisional standings ===
Pacific Division
| Pos | Team | GP | W | L | OTL | RW | GF | GA | GD | Pts |
|---|---|---|---|---|---|---|---|---|---|---|
| 1 | y – Vancouver Canucks | 82 | 50 | 23 | 9 | 44 | 279 | 223 | +56 | 109 |
| 2 | x – Edmonton Oilers | 82 | 49 | 27 | 6 | 39 | 294 | 237 | +57 | 104 |
| 3 | x – Los Angeles Kings | 82 | 44 | 27 | 11 | 37 | 256 | 215 | +41 | 99 |
| 4 | x – Vegas Golden Knights | 82 | 45 | 29 | 8 | 34 | 267 | 245 | +22 | 98 |
| 5 | Calgary Flames | 82 | 38 | 39 | 5 | 32 | 253 | 271 | −18 | 81 |
| 6 | Seattle Kraken | 82 | 34 | 35 | 13 | 28 | 217 | 236 | −19 | 81 |
| 7 | Anaheim Ducks | 82 | 27 | 50 | 5 | 21 | 204 | 295 | −91 | 59 |
| 8 | San Jose Sharks | 82 | 19 | 54 | 9 | 14 | 181 | 331 | −150 | 47 |

Source: National Hockey League
Rules for classification: 1) Fewer number of games played (GP, only during regular season); 2) Greater number of regulation wins (RW); 3) Greater number of wins in regulation and overtime, excluding shootout wins (ROW); 4) Greater number of total wins, including shootouts (W); 5) Greater number of points earned in head-to-head play; if teams played an uneven number of head-to-head games, the result of the first game on the home ice of the team with the extra home game is discarded; 6) Greater goal differential (GD); 7) Greater number of goals scored (GF)
x – Clinched playoff spot; y – Clinched division

=== Conference standings ===
Western Conference Wild Card
| Pos | Div | Team | GP | W | L | OTL | RW | GF | GA | GD | Pts |
|---|---|---|---|---|---|---|---|---|---|---|---|
| 1 | CE | x – Nashville Predators | 82 | 47 | 30 | 5 | 38 | 269 | 248 | +21 | 99 |
| 2 | PA | x – Vegas Golden Knights | 82 | 45 | 29 | 8 | 34 | 267 | 245 | +22 | 98 |
| 3 | CE | St. Louis Blues | 82 | 43 | 33 | 6 | 31 | 239 | 250 | −11 | 92 |
| 4 | CE | Minnesota Wild | 82 | 39 | 34 | 9 | 32 | 251 | 263 | −12 | 87 |
| 5 | PA | Calgary Flames | 82 | 38 | 39 | 5 | 32 | 253 | 271 | −18 | 81 |
| 6 | PA | Seattle Kraken | 82 | 34 | 35 | 13 | 28 | 217 | 236 | −19 | 81 |
| 7 | CE | Arizona Coyotes | 82 | 36 | 41 | 5 | 28 | 256 | 274 | −18 | 77 |
| 8 | PA | Anaheim Ducks | 82 | 27 | 50 | 5 | 21 | 204 | 295 | −91 | 59 |
| 9 | CE | Chicago Blackhawks | 82 | 23 | 53 | 6 | 17 | 179 | 290 | −111 | 52 |
| 10 | PA | San Jose Sharks | 82 | 19 | 54 | 9 | 14 | 181 | 331 | −150 | 47 |

Source: National Hockey League
Rules for classification: 1) Fewer number of games played (GP, only during regular season); 2) Greater number of regulation wins (RW); 3) Greater number of wins in regulation and overtime, excluding shootout wins (ROW); 4) Greater number of total wins, including shootouts (W); 5) Greater number of points earned in head-to-head play; if teams played an uneven number of head-to-head games, the result of the first game on the home ice of the team with the extra home game is discarded; 6) Greater goal differential (GD); 7) Greater number of goals scored (GF)
x – Clinched playoff spot

== Schedule and results ==
=== Preseason ===
The preseason schedule was released on June 22, 2023.

2023 preseason game log: 6–2–1 (Home: 3–1–0; Road: 3–1–1)

| # | Date | Visitor | Score | Home | OT | Decision | Location | Attendance | Record | Recap |
|---|---|---|---|---|---|---|---|---|---|---|
| 1 | September 23 | Los Angeles | 3–5 | Arizona | | Copley | Rod Laver Arena | 13,097 | 0–1–0 | |
| 2 | September 24 | Arizona | 2–3 | Los Angeles | | Rittich | Rod Laver Arena | 13,118 | 1–1–0 | |
| 3 | September 24 | Los Angeles | 2–3 | Anaheim | OT | Ingham | Honda Center | 12,047 | 1–1–1 | |
| 4 | September 27 | Los Angeles | 4–3 | Vegas | OT | Berube | T-Mobile Arena | 17,427 | 2–1–1 | |
| 5 | September 29 | Los Angeles | 4–3 | Anaheim | | Portillo | Pechanga Arena | 11,044 | 3–1–1 | |
| 6 | September 30 | Los Angeles | 2–1 | San Jose | OT | Rittich | SAP Center | 9,728 | 4–1–1 | |
| 7 | October 3 | Anaheim | 1–4 | Los Angeles | | Talbot | Crypto.com Arena | 12,423 | 5–1–1 | |
| 8^{A} | October 5 | San Jose | 3–4 | Los Angeles | OT | Copley | Delta Center | 8,550 | 6–1–1 | |
| 9 | October 7 | Vegas | 7–4 | Los Angeles | | Talbot | Crypto.com Arena | 15,080 | 6–2–1 | |

Legend:

Win Loss OT/SO Loss ^{A} – Frozen Fury

=== Regular season ===
The regular season schedule was released on June 27, 2023.

2023–24 game log
October: 5–2–2 (Home: 1–2–2; Road: 4–0–0)

| # | Date | Visitor | Score | Home | OT | Decision | Location | Attendance | Record | Points | Recap |
|---|---|---|---|---|---|---|---|---|---|---|---|
| 1 | October 11 | Colorado | 5–2 | Los Angeles | | Talbot | Crypto.com Arena | 18,145 | 0–1–0 | 0 | |
| 2 | October 14 | Carolina | 6–5 | Los Angeles | SO | Copley | Crypto.com Arena | 17,517 | 0–1–1 | 1 | |
| 3 | October 17 | Los Angeles | 5–1 | Winnipeg | | Talbot | Canada Life Centre | 11,226 | 1–1–1 | 3 | |
| 4 | October 19 | Los Angeles | 7–3 | Minnesota | | Talbot | Xcel Energy Center | 18,689 | 2–1–1 | 5 | |
| 5 | October 21 | Boston | 4–2 | Los Angeles | | Talbot | Crypto.com Arena | 18,145 | 2–2–1 | 5 | |
| 6 | October 24 | Arizona | 3–6 | Los Angeles | | Copley | Crypto.com Arena | 17,668 | 3–2–1 | 7 | |
| 7 | October 27 | Los Angeles | 5–4 | Arizona | | Talbot | Mullett Arena | 4,600 | 4–2–1 | 9 | |
| 8 | October 28 | Vegas | 4–3 | Los Angeles | SO | Talbot | Crypto.com Arena | 18,145 | 4–2–2 | 10 | |
| 9 | October 31 | Los Angeles | 4–1 | Toronto | | Talbot | Scotiabank Arena | 18,531 | 5–2–2 | 12 | |

November: 8–2–1 (Home: 3–2–1; Road: 5–0–0)

| # | Date | Visitor | Score | Home | OT | Decision | Location | Attendance | Record | Points | Recap |
|---|---|---|---|---|---|---|---|---|---|---|---|
| 10 | November 2 | Los Angeles | 3–2 | Ottawa | | Talbot | Canadian Tire Centre | 16,216 | 6–2–2 | 14 | |
| 11 | November 4 | Los Angeles | 5–0 | Philadelphia | | Talbot | Wells Fargo Center | 18,304 | 7–2–2 | 16 | |
| 12 | November 8 | Los Angeles | 4–1 | Vegas | | Talbot | T-Mobile Arena | 18,330 | 8–2–2 | 18 | |
| 13 | November 9 | Pittsburgh | 4–3 | Los Angeles | OT | Copley | Crypto.com Arena | 18,145 | 8–2–3 | 19 | |
| 14 | November 11 | Philadelphia | 4–2 | Los Angeles | | Talbot | Crypto.com Arena | 18,145 | 8–3–3 | 19 | |
| 15 | November 16 | Florida | 1–2 | Los Angeles | | Talbot | Crypto.com Arena | 17,243 | 9–3–3 | 21 | |
| 16 | November 18 | St. Louis | 1–5 | Los Angeles | | Talbot | Crypto.com Arena | 18,145 | 10–3–3 | 23 | |
| 17 | November 20 | Los Angeles | 4–1 | Arizona | | Copley | Mullett Arena | 4,600 | 11–3–3 | 25 | |
| 18 | November 24 | Los Angeles | 5–2 | Anaheim | | Talbot | Honda Center | 17,205 | 12–3–3 | 27 | |
| 19 | November 25 | Montreal | 0–4 | Los Angeles | | Copley | Crypto.com Arena | 18,145 | 13–3–3 | 29 | |
| 20 | November 29 | Washington | 2–1 | Los Angeles | | Talbot | Crypto.com Arena | 18,145 | 13–4–3 | 29 | |

December: 7–4–2 (Home: 3–2–1; Road: 4–2–1)

| # | Date | Visitor | Score | Home | OT | Decision | Location | Attendance | Record | Points | Recap |
|---|---|---|---|---|---|---|---|---|---|---|---|
| 21 | December 3 | Colorado | 1–4 | Los Angeles | | Talbot | Crypto.com Arena | 18,145 | 14–4–3 | 31 | |
| 22 | December 5 | Los Angeles | 4–3 | Columbus | OT | Copley | Nationwide Arena | 15,088 | 15–4–3 | 33 | |
| 23 | December 7 | Los Angeles | 4–0 | Montreal | | Talbot | Bell Centre | 21,105 | 16–4–3 | 35 | |
| 24 | December 9 | Los Angeles | 2–3 | NY Islanders | OT | Talbot | UBS Arena | 17,255 | 16–4–4 | 36 | |
| 25 | December 10 | Los Angeles | 1–4 | NY Rangers | | Copley | Madison Square Garden | 18,006 | 16–5–4 | 36 | |
| 26 | December 13 | Winnipeg | 5–2 | Los Angeles | | Talbot | Crypto.com Arena | 18,145 | 16–6–4 | 36 | |
| 27 | December 16 | Los Angeles | 3–2 | Seattle | SO | Talbot | Climate Pledge Arena | 17,151 | 17–6–4 | 38 | |
| 28 | December 19 | Los Angeles | 4–1 | San Jose | | Rittich | SAP Center | 11,593 | 18–6–4 | 40 | |
| 29 | December 20 | Seattle | 2–1 | Los Angeles | | Talbot | Crypto.com Arena | 18,145 | 18–7–4 | 40 | |
| 30 | December 23 | Calgary | 3–5 | Los Angeles | | Talbot | Crypto.com Arena | 18,145 | 19–7–4 | 42 | |
| 31 | December 27 | San Jose | 1–5 | Los Angeles | | Rittich | Crypto.com Arena | 18,145 | 20–7–4 | 44 | |
| 32 | December 28 | Los Angeles | 2–3 | Vegas | | Talbot | T-Mobile Arena | 18,595 | 20–8–4 | 44 | |
| 33 | December 30 | Edmonton | 3–2 | Los Angeles | SO | Talbot | Crypto.com Arena | 18,145 | 20–8–5 | 45 | |

January: 3–7–5 (Home: 1–3–2; Road: 2–4–3)

| # | Date | Visitor | Score | Home | OT | Decision | Location | Attendance | Record | Points | Recap |
|---|---|---|---|---|---|---|---|---|---|---|---|
| 34 | January 2 | Toronto | 3–0 | Los Angeles | | Talbot | Crypto.com Arena | 18,145 | 20–9–5 | 45 | |
| 35 | January 4 | Detroit | 4–3 | Los Angeles | SO | Rittich | Crypto.com Arena | 18,145 | 20–9–6 | 46 | |
| 36 | January 7 | Los Angeles | 3–4 | Washington | | Talbot | Capital One Arena | 18,573 | 20–10–6 | 46 | |
| 37 | January 9 | Los Angeles | 2–3 | Tampa Bay | OT | Talbot | Amalie Arena | 19,092 | 20–10–7 | 47 | |
| 38 | January 11 | Los Angeles | 2–3 | Florida | OT | Talbot | Amerant Bank Arena | 18,616 | 20–10–8 | 48 | |
| 39 | January 13 | Los Angeles | 3–5 | Detroit | | Talbot | Little Caesars Arena | 19,515 | 20–11–8 | 48 | |
| 40 | January 15 | Los Angeles | 5–2 | Carolina | | Rittich | PNC Arena | 18,825 | 21–11–8 | 50 | |
| 41 | January 16 | Los Angeles | 1–5 | Dallas | | Talbot | American Airlines Center | 18,532 | 21–12–8 | 50 | |
| 42 | January 18 | Nashville | 2–1 | Los Angeles | | Rittich | Crypto.com Arena | 18,145 | 21–13–8 | 50 | |
| 43 | January 20 | NY Rangers | 1–2 | Los Angeles | | Rittich | Crypto.com Arena | 18,292 | 22–13–8 | 52 | |
| 44 | January 22 | San Jose | 4–3 | Los Angeles | SO | Rittich | Crypto.com Arena | 18,145 | 22–13–9 | 53 | |
| 45 | January 24 | Buffalo | 5–3 | Los Angeles | | Talbot | Crypto.com Arena | 18,145 | 22–14–9 | 53 | |
| 46 | January 26 | Los Angeles | 1–5 | Colorado | | Talbot | Ball Arena | 18,131 | 22–15–9 | 53 | |
| 47 | January 28 | Los Angeles | 3–4 | St. Louis | OT | Rittich | Enterprise Center | 18,096 | 22–15–10 | 54 | |
| 48 | January 31 | Los Angeles | 4–2 | Nashville | | Rittich | Bridgestone Arena | 17,453 | 23–15–10 | 56 | |

February: 7–4–0 (Home: 3–1–0; Road: 4–3–0)

| # | Date | Visitor | Score | Home | OT | Decision | Location | Attendance | Record | Points | Recap |
|---|---|---|---|---|---|---|---|---|---|---|---|
| 49 | February 10 | Edmonton | 0–4 | Los Angeles | | Rittich | Crypto.com Arena | 18,145 | 24–15–10 | 58 | |
| 50 | February 13 | Los Angeles | 0–7 | Buffalo | | Rittich | KeyBank Center | 13,292 | 24–16–10 | 58 | |
| 51 | February 15 | Los Angeles | 2–1 | New Jersey | | Rittich | Prudential Center | 16,105 | 25–16–10 | 60 | |
| 52 | February 17 | Los Angeles | 5–4 | Boston | OT | Rittich | TD Garden | 17,850 | 26–16–10 | 62 | |
| 53 | February 18 | Los Angeles | 2–1 | Pittsburgh | | Talbot | PPG Paints Arena | 18,422 | 27–16–10 | 64 | |
| 54 | February 20 | Columbus | 1–5 | Los Angeles | | Talbot | Crypto.com Arena | 16,980 | 28–16–10 | 66 | |
| 55 | February 22 | Nashville | 4–1 | Los Angeles | | Talbot | Crypto.com Arena | 17,415 | 28–17–10 | 66 | |
| 56 | February 24 | Anaheim | 2–3 | Los Angeles | SO | Rittich | Crypto.com Arena | 18,203 | 29–17–10 | 68 | |
| 57 | February 26 | Los Angeles | 2–4 | Edmonton | | Rittich | Rogers Place | 18,347 | 29–18–10 | 68 | |
| 58 | February 27 | Los Angeles | 2–4 | Calgary | | Talbot | Scotiabank Saddledome | 16,450 | 29–19–10 | 68 | |
| 59 | February 29 | Los Angeles | 5–1 | Vancouver | | Talbot | Rogers Arena | 18,801 | 30–19–10 | 70 | |

March: 8–5–1 (Home: 6–1–1; Road: 2–4–0)

| # | Date | Visitor | Score | Home | OT | Decision | Location | Attendance | Record | Points | Recap |
|---|---|---|---|---|---|---|---|---|---|---|---|
| 60 | March 3 | New Jersey | 1–5 | Los Angeles | | Talbot | Crypto.com Arena | 18,145 | 31–19–10 | 72 | |
| 61 | March 5 | Vancouver | 2–1 | Los Angeles | OT | Talbot | Crypto.com Arena | 18,145 | 31–19–11 | 73 | |
| 62 | March 7 | Ottawa | 3–4 | Los Angeles | OT | Talbot | Crypto.com Arena | 16,855 | 32–19–11 | 75 | |
| 63 | March 9 | Dallas | 4–1 | Los Angeles | | Talbot | Crypto.com Arena | 18,145 | 32–20–11 | 75 | |
| 64 | March 11 | NY Islanders | 0–3 | Los Angeles | | Rittich | Crypto.com Arena | 17,061 | 33–20–11 | 77 | |
| 65 | March 13 | Los Angeles | 1–3 | St. Louis | | Talbot | Enterprise Center | 18,096 | 33–21–11 | 77 | |
| 66 | March 15 | Los Angeles | 5–0 | Chicago | | Talbot | United Center | 19,528 | 34–21–11 | 79 | |
| 67 | March 16 | Los Angeles | 1–4 | Dallas | | Rittich | American Airlines Center | 18,532 | 34–22–11 | 79 | |
| 68 | March 19 | Chicago | 2–6 | Los Angeles | | Talbot | Crypto.com Arena | 18,145 | 35–22–11 | 81 | |
| 69 | March 20 | Minnesota | 0–6 | Los Angeles | | Rittich | Crypto.com Arena | 17,086 | 36–22–11 | 83 | |
| 70 | March 23 | Tampa Bay | 3–4 | Los Angeles | OT | Talbot | Crypto.com Arena | 18,318 | 37–22–11 | 85 | |
| 71 | March 25 | Los Angeles | 3–2 | Vancouver | | Talbot | Rogers Arena | 18,870 | 38–22–11 | 87 | |
| 72 | March 28 | Los Angeles | 1–4 | Edmonton | | Talbot | Rogers Place | 18,347 | 38–23–11 | 87 | |
| 73 | March 30 | Los Angeles | 2–4 | Calgary | | Rittich | Scotiabank Saddledome | 17,517 | 38–24–11 | 87 | |

April: 6–3–0 (Home: 5–1–0; Road: 1–2–0)

| # | Date | Visitor | Score | Home | OT | Decision | Location | Attendance | Record | Points | Recap |
|---|---|---|---|---|---|---|---|---|---|---|---|
| 74 | April 1 | Los Angeles | 3–4 | Winnipeg | | Talbot | Canada Life Centre | 13,334 | 38–25–11 | 87 | |
| 75 | April 3 | Seattle | 2–5 | Los Angeles | | Talbot | Crypto.com Arena | 18,145 | 39–25–11 | 89 | |
| 76 | April 4 | Los Angeles | 2–1 | San Jose | | Rittich | SAP Center | 12,266 | 40–25–11 | 91 | |
| 77 | April 6 | Vancouver | 3–6 | Los Angeles | | Talbot | Crypto.com Arena | 18,190 | 41–25–11 | 93 | |
| 78 | April 9 | Los Angeles | 1–3 | Anaheim | | Talbot | Honda Center | 17,174 | 41–26–11 | 93 | |
| 79 | April 11 | Calgary | 1–4 | Los Angeles | | Talbot | Crypto.com Arena | 17,340 | 42–26–11 | 95 | |
| 80 | April 13 | Anaheim | 1–3 | Los Angeles | | Rittich | Crypto.com Arena | 18,133 | 43–26–11 | 97 | |
| 81 | April 15 | Minnesota | 3–1 | Los Angeles | | Talbot | Crypto.com Arena | 17,654 | 43–27–11 | 97 | |
| 82 | April 18 | Chicago | 4–5 | Los Angeles | OT | Talbot | Crypto.com Arena | 18,145 | 44–27–11 | 99 | |

Legend: Win (2 points) Loss (0 points) OT/SO loss (1 point)

=== Playoffs ===
2024 Stanley Cup playoffs
Western Conference first round vs. (P2) Edmonton Oilers: Edmonton won 4–1

| # | Date | Visitor | Score | Home | OT | Decision | Attendance | Series | Recap |
|---|---|---|---|---|---|---|---|---|---|
| 1 | April 22 | Los Angeles | 4–7 | Edmonton | | Talbot | 18,347 | 0–1 | |
| 2 | April 24 | Los Angeles | 5–4 | Edmonton | OT | Talbot | 18,347 | 1–1 | |
| 3 | April 26 | Edmonton | 6–1 | Los Angeles | | Talbot | 18,145 | 1–2 | |
| 4 | April 28 | Edmonton | 1–0 | Los Angeles | | Rittich | 18,145 | 1–3 | |
| 5 | May 1 | Los Angeles | 3–4 | Edmonton | | Rittich | 18,347 | 1–4 | |

Legend: Win Loss

== Player statistics ==
Stats updated as of May 1, 2024

=== Skaters ===
Regular season
| Player | GP | G | A | Pts | +/– | PIM |
|---|---|---|---|---|---|---|
| Adrian Kempe | 77 | 28 | 47 | 75 | +13 | 72 |
| Kevin Fiala | 82 | 29 | 44 | 73 | +1 | 62 |
| Anze Kopitar | 81 | 26 | 44 | 70 | +11 | 22 |
| Trevor Moore | 82 | 31 | 26 | 57 | +11 | 28 |
| Quinton Byfield | 80 | 20 | 35 | 55 | +19 | 42 |
| Drew Doughty | 82 | 15 | 35 | 50 | +15 | 44 |
| Phillip Danault | 78 | 17 | 30 | 47 | +12 | 18 |
| Pierre-Luc Dubois | 82 | 16 | 24 | 40 | −9 | 70 |
| Matt Roy | 81 | 5 | 20 | 25 | +21 | 42 |
| Jordan Spence | 71 | 2 | 22 | 24 | +5 | 12 |
| Alex Laferriere | 81 | 12 | 11 | 23 | −14 | 46 |
| Vladislav Gavrikov | 77 | 6 | 17 | 23 | +9 | 28 |
| Mikey Anderson | 74 | 2 | 16 | 18 | +22 | 18 |
| Trevor Lewis | 82 | 8 | 8 | 16 | +7 | 20 |
| Arthur Kaliyev | 51 | 7 | 8 | 15 | −3 | 14 |
| Blake Lizotte | 62 | 7 | 8 | 15 | +11 | 20 |
| Viktor Arvidsson | 18 | 6 | 9 | 15 | +4 | 14 |
| Carl Grundstrom | 50 | 8 | 4 | 12 | −2 | 12 |
| Andreas Englund | 82 | 1 | 9 | 10 | −3 | 81 |
| Brandt Clarke | 16 | 2 | 4 | 6 | −6 | 10 |
| Akil Thomas | 7 | 3 | 1 | 4 | 0 | 2 |
| Alex Turcotte | 20 | 1 | 3 | 4 | +5 | 6 |
| Jaret Anderson-Dolan | 30 | 1 | 3 | 4 | −4 | 6 |
| Jacob Moverare | 24 | 1 | 0 | 1 | 0 | 6 |
| Tobias Bjornfot^{‡} | 1 | 0 | 0 | 0 | 0 | 0 |
| Samuel Fagemo^{†} | 4 | 0 | 0 | 0 | −1 | 0 |

Playoffs
| Player | GP | G | A | Pts | +/− | PIM |
|---|---|---|---|---|---|---|
| Adrian Kempe | 5 | 4 | 1 | 5 | –1 | 4 |
| Quinton Byfield | 5 | 0 | 4 | 4 | +4 | 4 |
| Drew Doughty | 5 | 2 | 1 | 3 | –4 | 14 |
| Mikey Anderson | 5 | 1 | 2 | 3 | –1 | 2 |
| Anze Kopitar | 5 | 1 | 2 | 3 | 0 | 4 |
| Viktor Arvidsson | 5 | 0 | 3 | 3 | –1 | 0 |
| Alex Laferriere | 5 | 1 | 1 | 2 | 0 | 0 |
| Kevin Fiala | 5 | 1 | 1 | 2 | +1 | 4 |
| Matt Roy | 5 | 0 | 2 | 2 | +1 | 2 |
| Vladislav Gavrikov | 5 | 0 | 2 | 2 | 0 | 2 |
| Blake Lizotte | 5 | 1 | 0 | 1 | 0 | 2 |
| Trevor Moore | 5 | 1 | 0 | 1 | –1 | 4 |
| Pierre-Luc Dubois | 5 | 1 | 0 | 1 | 0 | 20 |
| Jordan Spence | 5 | 0 | 1 | 1 | +2 | 0 |
| Andreas Englund | 5 | 0 | 1 | 1 | +1 | 9 |
| Phillip Danault | 5 | 0 | 1 | 1 | 0 | 4 |
| Carl Grundstrom | 5 | 0 | 0 | 0 | 0 | 0 |
| Trevor Lewis | 5 | 0 | 0 | 0 | –1 | 0 |

=== Goaltenders ===
Regular season
| Player | GP | GS | TOI | W | L | OT | GA | GAA | SA | SV% | SO | G | A | PIM |
|---|---|---|---|---|---|---|---|---|---|---|---|---|---|---|
| Cam Talbot | 54 | 52 | 3,116:07 | 27 | 20 | 6 | 130 | 2.50 | 1,490 | .913 | 3 | 0 | 3 | 4 |
| David Rittich | 24 | 22 | 1,364:31 | 13 | 6 | 3 | 49 | 2.15 | 621 | .921 | 3 | 0 | 0 | 0 |
| Pheonix Copley | 8 | 8 | 436:17 | 4 | 1 | 2 | 23 | 3.16 | 177 | .870 | 1 | 0 | 0 | 0 |

Playoffs
| Player | GP | GS | TOI | W | L | GA | GAA | SA | SV% | SO | G | A | PIM |
|---|---|---|---|---|---|---|---|---|---|---|---|---|---|
| Cam Talbot | 3 | 3 | 181:00 | 1 | 2 | 16 | 5.20 | 115 | .861 | 0 | 0 | 0 | 0 |
| David Rittich | 2 | 2 | 117:09 | 0 | 2 | 5 | 2.56 | 5 | .872 | 0 | 0 | 0 | 0 |

^{†}Denotes player spent time with another team before joining the Kings. Stats reflect time with the Kings only.
^{‡}Denotes player was traded mid-season. Stats reflect time with the Kings only.
Bold/italics denotes franchise record.

== Transactions ==
The Kings have been involved in the following transactions during the 2023–24 season.

Key:

† Contract is entry-level.
‡ Contract initially takes effect in the 2024–25 season.

=== Trades ===
| Date | Details | | Ref |
|---|---|---|---|
| June 19, 2024 | To Washington Capitals Pierre-Luc Dubois | To Los Angeles Kings Darcy Kuemper | |
| June 27, 2024 | To San Jose Sharks Carl Grundstrom | To Los Angeles Kings Kyle Burroughs | |

=== Players acquired ===
| Date | Player | Former team | Term | Via | Ref |
|---|---|---|---|---|---|
| July 1, 2023 | Andreas Englund | Chicago Blackhawks | 2-year | Free agency | |
| July 1, 2023 | Trevor Lewis | Calgary Flames | 1-year | Free agency | |
| July 1, 2023 | Mikhail Maltsev | Colorado Avalanche | 1-year | Free agency | |
| July 1, 2023 | David Rittich | Winnipeg Jets | 1-year | Free agency | |
| July 1, 2023 | Steven Santini | St. Louis Blues | 1-year | Free agency | |
| July 1, 2023 | Cam Talbot | Ottawa Senators | 1-year | Free agency | |
| July 2, 2023 | Joe Hicketts | Minnesota Wild | 1-year | Free agency | |
| November 11, 2023 | Samuel Fagemo | Nashville Predators | | Waivers | |

=== Players lost ===
| Date | Player | New team | Term | Via | Ref |
|---|---|---|---|---|---|
| July 1, 2023 | Joonas Korpisalo | Ottawa Senators | 5-year | Free agency | |
| July 1, 2023 | Matt Villalta | Arizona Coyotes | 1-year | Free agency | |
| July 2, 2023 | Lias Andersson | Montreal Canadiens | 1-year | Free agency | |
| July 2, 2023 | Tobie Paquette-Bisson | Laval Rocket (AHL) | 1-year | Free agency | |
| July 6, 2023 | Zack MacEwen | Ottawa Senators | 3-year | Free agency | |
| July 18, 2023 | Jacob Ingham | Ontario Reign (AHL) | 1-year | Free agency | |
| July 31, 2023 | Aidan Dudas | HC TPS (Liiga) | 1-year | Free agency | |
| October 2, 2023 | Samuel Fagemo | Nashville Predators | | Waivers | |
| January 4, 2024 | Tobias Bjornfot | Vegas Golden Knights | | Waivers | |
| March 7, 2024 | Jaret Anderson-Dolan | Nashville Predators | | Waivers | |

=== Signings ===
| Date | Player | Term | Ref |
|---|---|---|---|
| June 30, 2023 | Taylor Ward | 1-year | |
| July 1, 2023 | Jaret Anderson-Dolan | 1-year | |
| July 6, 2023 | Anze Kopitar | 2-year | |
| July 7, 2023 | Tobias Bjornfot | 2-year | |
| July 7, 2023 | Samuel Fagemo | 1-year | |
| July 7, 2023 | Tyler Madden | 1-year | |
| July 8, 2023 | Akil Thomas | 1-year | |
| July 14, 2023 | Jakub Dvorak | 3-year† | |
| November 17, 2023 | Koehn Ziemmer | 3-year† | |
| December 29, 2023 | Angus Booth | 3-year† | |
| May 15, 2024 | David Rittich | 1-year‡ | |

== Draft picks ==
Below are the Los Angeles Kings selections at the 2023 NHL entry draft, which was held on June 28 and 29, 2023, at Bridgestone Arena in Nashville.

| Round | # | Player | Pos | Nationality | College/Junior/Club team (League) |
|---|---|---|---|---|---|
| 2 | 54 | Jakub Dvorak | D | Czechia | Bílí Tygři Liberec (ELH) |
| 3 | 78 | Koehn Ziemmer | RW | Canada | Prince George Cougars (WHL) |
| 4 | 118 | Hampton Slukynsky | G | United States | Warroad Warriors (USHS-MN) |
| 5 | 150 | Matthew Mania | D | Canada | Sudbury Wolves (OHL) |
| 6 | 182 | Ryan Conmy | RW | United States | Sioux City Musketeers (USHL) |
