= 2023–24 Detroit Red Wings season =

National Hockey League season

2023–24 Detroit Red Wings
- Division: 5th Atlantic
- Conference: 9th Eastern
- 2023–24 record: 41–32–9
- Home record: 23–13–5
- Road record: 18–19–4
- Goals for: 278
- Goals against: 274

Team information
- General manager: Steve Yzerman
- Coach: Derek Lalonde
- Captain: Dylan Larkin
- Alternate captains: Ben Chiarot; Andrew Copp; David Perron
- Arena: Little Caesars Arena
- Average attendance: 19,116
- Minor league affiliates: Grand Rapids Griffins (AHL); Toledo Walleye (ECHL)

Team leaders
- Goals: Dylan Larkin (33)
- Assists: Shayne Gostisbehere (46)
- Points: Lucas Raymond (72)
- Penalty minutes: Ben Chiarot (56)
- Plus/minus: Olli Maata (+14)
- Wins: Alex Lyon (21)
- Goals against average: Alex Lyon (3.05)

The 2023–24 Detroit Red Wings season was the 98th season for the National Hockey League (NHL) franchise that was established on September 25, 1926. It was the Red Wings' seventh season at Little Caesars Arena. This was the Red Wings' second season under head coach Derek Lalonde. The Red Wings played two games on November 16 and 17 in Stockholm at the Avicii Arena as part of the NHL Global Series.

The Red Wings were eliminated from playoff contention for the eighth consecutive season for the first time in franchise history via tiebreaker on April 16, 2024, after the Washington Capitals' 2–1 win over the Philadelphia Flyers. They finished the season with a 41–32–9 record. This would result in their first non-losing season since 2015-16.

== Standings ==
=== Divisional standings ===
Atlantic Division
Pos	Team	GP	W	L	OTL	RW	GF	GA	GD	Pts
1	y – Florida Panthers	82	52	24	6	42	268	200	+68	110
2	x – Boston Bruins	82	47	20	15	36	267	224	+43	109
3	x – Toronto Maple Leafs	82	46	26	10	33	303	263	+40	102
4	x – Tampa Bay Lightning	82	45	29	8	37	291	268	+23	98
5	Detroit Red Wings	82	41	32	9	27	278	274	+4	91
6	Buffalo Sabres	82	39	37	6	33	246	244	+2	84
7	Ottawa Senators	82	37	41	4	25	255	281	−26	78
8	Montreal Canadiens	82	30	36	16	20	236	289	−53	76

Source: National Hockey League
Rules for classification: 1) Fewer number of games played (GP, only during regular season); 2) Greater number of regulation wins (RW); 3) Greater number of wins in regulation and overtime, excluding shootout wins (ROW); 4) Greater number of total wins, including shootouts (W); 5) Greater number of points earned in head-to-head play; if teams played an uneven number of head-to-head games, the result of the first game on the home ice of the team with the extra home game is discarded; 6) Greater goal differential (GD); 7) Greater number of goals scored (GF)
x – Clinched playoff spot; y – Clinched division

=== Conference standings ===
Eastern Conference Wild Card
Pos	Div	Team	GP	W	L	OTL	RW	GF	GA	GD	Pts
1	AT	x – Tampa Bay Lightning	82	45	29	8	37	291	268	+23	98
2	ME	x – Washington Capitals	82	40	31	11	32	220	257	−37	91
3	AT	Detroit Red Wings	82	41	32	9	27	278	274	+4	91
4	ME	Pittsburgh Penguins	82	38	32	12	32	255	251	+4	88
5	ME	Philadelphia Flyers	82	38	33	11	30	235	261	−26	87
6	AT	Buffalo Sabres	82	39	37	6	33	246	244	+2	84
7	ME	New Jersey Devils	82	38	39	5	33	264	283	−19	81
8	AT	Ottawa Senators	82	37	41	4	25	255	281	−26	78
9	AT	Montreal Canadiens	82	30	36	16	20	236	289	−53	76
10	ME	Columbus Blue Jackets	82	27	43	12	21	237	300	−63	66

Source: National Hockey League
Rules for classification: 1) Fewer number of games played (GP, only during regular season); 2) Greater number of regulation wins (RW); 3) Greater number of wins in regulation and overtime, excluding shootout wins (ROW); 4) Greater number of total wins, including shootouts (W); 5) Greater number of points earned in head-to-head play; if teams played an uneven number of head-to-head games, the result of the first game on the home ice of the team with the extra home game is discarded; 6) Greater goal differential (GD); 7) Greater number of goals scored (GF)
x – Clinched playoff spot

== Schedule and results ==
=== Preseason ===
2023 preseason game log: 5–2–1 (Home: 4–0–0; Road: 1–2–1)
#	Date	Visitor	Score	Home	OT	Decision	Attendance	Record	Recap
1	September 26	Pittsburgh	3–4	Detroit		Bednar	7,991	1–0–0
2	September 28	Detroit	3–4	Washington		Cossa	12,746	1–1–0
3	September 30	Washington	2–5	Detroit		Husso	11,050	2–1–0
4	October 1	Chicago	1–6	Detroit		Reimer	13,850	3–1–0
5	October 3	Detroit	2–4	Chicago		Hutchinson	12,610	3–2–0
6	October 4	Detroit	2–1	Pittsburgh		Reimer	13,957	4–2–0
7	October 5	Detroit	3–4	Toronto	OT	Lyon	18,011	4–2–1
8	October 7	Toronto	3–4	Detroit		Husso	18,595	5–2–1

=== Regular season ===
2023–24 game log 41–32–9 (Home: 23–13–5; Road: 18–19–4)

October: 6–3–1 (Home: 3–1–1; Road: 3–2–0)
#	Date	Visitor	Score	Home	OT	Decision	Attendance	Record	Pts	Recap
1	October 12	Detroit	3–4	New Jersey		Husso	16,514	0–1–0	0
2	October 14	Tampa Bay	4–6	Detroit		Husso	19,515	1–1–0	2
3	October 16	Detroit	4–0	Columbus		Reimer	14,959	2–1–0	4
4	October 18	Pittsburgh	3–6	Detroit		Husso	18,895	3–1–0	6
5	October 21	Detroit	5–2	Ottawa		Husso	18,834	4–1–0	8
6	October 22	Calgary	2–6	Detroit		Reimer	17,626	5–1–0	10
7	October 24	Seattle	5–4	Detroit	OT	Husso	16,894	5–1–1	11
8	October 26	Winnipeg	4–1	Detroit		Reimer	17,857	5–2–1	11
9	October 28	Detroit	1–4	Boston		Husso	17,850	5–3–1	11
10	October 30	Detroit	4–3	NY Islanders	OT	Husso	15,407	6–3–1	13

November: 6–4–2 (Home: 5–2–1; Road: 1–2–1)
#	Date	Visitor	Score	Home	OT	Decision	Attendance	Record	Pts	Recap
11	November 2	Florida	2–0	Detroit		Reimer	17,233	6–4–1	13
12	November 4	Boston	4–5	Detroit		Husso	18,676	7–4–1	15
13	November 7	Detroit	3–5	NY Rangers		Husso	18,006	7–5–1	15
14	November 9	Montreal	3–2	Detroit	OT	Reimer	18,504	7–5–2	16
15	November 11	Columbus	4–5	Detroit		Husso	19,156	8–5–2	18
16	November 16^{[a]}	Detroit	4–5	Ottawa	OT	Reimer	12,487	8–5–3	19
17	November 17^{[a]}	Toronto	3–2	Detroit		Lyon	13,510	8–6–3	19
18	November 22	New Jersey	0–4	Detroit		Lyon	19,515	9–6–3	21
19	November 24	Detroit	5–2	Boston		Husso	17,850	10–6–3	23
20	November 26	Minnesota	1–4	Detroit		Lyon	18,833	11–6–3	25
21	November 29	Detroit	2–3	NY Rangers		Husso	18,006	11–7–3	25
22	November 30	Chicago	1–5	Detroit		Lyon	19,515	12–7–3	27

December: 5–9–1 (Home: 2–4–1; Road: 3–5–0)
#	Date	Visitor	Score	Home	OT	Decision	Attendance	Record	Pts	Recap
23	December 2	Detroit	5–4	Montreal	OT	Husso	21,105	13–7–3	29
24	December 5	Detroit	5–3	Buffalo		Lyon	14,800	14–7–3	31
25	December 7	San Jose	6–5	Detroit	OT	Husso	19,515	14–7–4	32
26	December 9	Ottawa	5–1	Detroit		Lyon	19,515	14–8–4	32
27	December 11	Detroit	3–6	Dallas		Reimer	18,532	14–9–4	32
28	December 12	Detroit	6–4	St. Louis		Husso	18,096	15–9–4	34
29	December 14	Carolina	2–1	Detroit		Husso	19,515	15–10–4	34
30	December 16	Detroit	0–1	Philadelphia		Lyon	18,341	15–11–4	34
31	December 18	Anaheim	4–3	Detroit		Reimer	19,515	15–12–4	34
32	December 20	Detroit	2–5	Winnipeg		Reimer	12,571	15–13–4	34
33	December 22	Philadelphia	6–7	Detroit	SO	Reimer	19,515	16–13–4	36
34	December 23	Detroit	2–3	New Jersey		Hutchinson	16,514	16–14–4	36
35	December 27	Detroit	3–6	Minnesota		Reimer	19,105	16–15–4	36
36	December 29	Nashville	4–5	Detroit	OT	Lyon	19,515	17–15–4	38
37	December 31	Boston	5–3	Detroit		Lyon	19,515	17–16–4	38

January: 9–2–2 (Home: 4–1–2; Road: 5–1–0)
#	Date	Visitor	Score	Home	OT	Decision	Attendance	Record	Pts	Recap
38	January 2	Detroit	5–3	San Jose		Lyon	12,195	18–16–4	40
39	January 4	Detroit	4–3	Los Angeles	SO	Lyon	18,145	19–16–4	42
40	January 7	Detroit	3–2	Anaheim		Lyon	17,174	20–16–4	44
41	January 11	Edmonton	3–2	Detroit	OT	Lyon	19,515	20–16–5	45
42	January 13	Los Angeles	3–5	Detroit		Lyon	19,515	21–16–5	47
43	January 14	Detroit	4–2	Toronto		Reimer	18,772	22–16–5	49
44	January 17	Detroit	3–2	Florida	OT	Lyon	17,958	23–16–5	51
45	January 19	Detroit	2–4	Carolina		Lyon	18,841	23–17–5	51
46	January 21	Tampa Bay	1–2	Detroit		Lyon	19,515	24–17–5	53
47	January 23	Dallas	5–4	Detroit		Lyon	18,923	24–18–5	53
48	January 25	Philadelphia	0–3	Detroit		Lyon	19,515	25–18–5	55
49	January 27	Vegas	2–5	Detroit		Lyon	19,515	26–18–5	57
50	January 31	Ottawa	3–2	Detroit	OT	Lyon	19,515	26–18–6	58

February: 7–3–0 (Home: 4–1–0; Road: 3–2–0)
#	Date	Visitor	Score	Home	OT	Decision	Attendance	Record	Pts	Recap
All-Star Break in Toronto
51	February 10	Vancouver	3–4	Detroit	OT	Lyon	19,515	27–18–6	60
52	February 13	Detroit	4–8	Edmonton		Lyon	18,347	27–19–6	60
53	February 15	Detroit	1–4	Vancouver		Lyon	18,947	27–20–6	60
54	February 17	Detroit	5–0	Calgary		Reimer	17,854	28–20–6	62
55	February 19	Detroit	4–3	Seattle	OT	Lyon	17,151	29–20–6	64
56	February 22	Colorado	1–2	Detroit	OT	Lyon	19,515	30–20–6	66
57	February 24	St. Louis	1–6	Detroit		Lyon	19,515	31–20–6	68
58	February 25	Detroit	3–2	Chicago	OT	Reimer	21,141	32–20–6	70
59	February 27	Washington	3–8	Detroit		Lyon	19,515	33–20–6	72
60	February 29	NY Islanders	5–3	Detroit		Lyon	19,515	33–21–6	72

March: 3–9–2 (Home: 3–2–0; Road: 0–7–2)
#	Date	Visitor	Score	Home	OT	Decision	Attendance	Record	Pts	Recap
61	March 2	Florida	4–0	Detroit		Lyon	19,515	33–22–6	72
62	March 6	Detroit	2–7	Colorado		Lyon	18,132	33–23–6	72
63	March 8	Detroit	0–4	Arizona		Lyon	4,600	33–24–6	72
64	March 9	Detroit	3–5	Vegas		Reimer	18,401	33–25–6	72
65	March 12	Detroit	3–7	Buffalo		Lyon	15,529	33–26–6	72
66	March 14	Arizona	4–1	Detroit		Lyon	18,580	33–27–6	72
67	March 16	Buffalo	1–4	Detroit		Reimer	19,515	34–27–6	74
68	March 17	Detroit	3–6	Pittsburgh		Lyon	17,191	34–28–6	74
69	March 19	Columbus	3–4	Detroit	OT	Reimer	19,515	35–28–6	76
70	March 21	NY Islanders	3–6	Detroit		Reimer	18,868	36–28–6	78
71	March 23	Detroit	0–1	Nashville		Lyon	17,836	36–29–6	78
72	March 26	Detroit	3–4	Washington	OT	Lyon	18,573	36–29–7	79
73	March 28	Detroit	0–4	Carolina		Reimer	18,906	36–30–7	79
74	March 30	Detroit	2–3	Florida	SO	Lyon	19,290	36–30–8	80

April: 5–2–1 (Home: 2–2–0; Road: 3–0–1)
#	Date	Visitor	Score	Home	OT	Decision	Attendance	Record	Pts	Recap
75	April 1	Detroit	4–2	Tampa Bay		Lyon	19,092	37–30–8	82
76	April 5	NY Rangers	4–3	Detroit		Lyon	19,515	37–31–8	82
77	April 7	Buffalo	1–3	Detroit		Lyon	19,515	38–31–8	84
78	April 9	Washington	2–1	Detroit		Lyon	19,515	38–32–8	84
79	April 11	Detroit	5–6	Pittsburgh	OT	Lyon	18,294	38–32–9	85
80	April 13	Detroit	5–4	Toronto	OT	Reimer	19,123	39–32–9	87
81	April 15	Montreal	4–5	Detroit	OT	Lyon	19,515	40–32–9	89
82	April 16	Detroit	5–4	Montreal	SO	Reimer	21,105	41–32–9	91

Legend: Win (2 points) Loss (0 points) Overtime/shootout loss (1 point)
Notes:
^{a} Game was played at Avicii Arena in Stockholm, Sweden.

== Player statistics ==
=== Skaters ===
Regular season
Player	GP	G	A	Pts	+/−	PIM
Lucas Raymond	82	31	41	72	–12	30
Dylan Larkin	68	33	36	69	+5	39
Alex DeBrincat	82	27	40	67	+1	34
Shayne Gostisbehere	81	10	46	56	−16	16
J. T. Compher	77	19	29	48	–5	34
Patrick Kane	50	20	27	47	–5	16
David Perron	76	17	30	47	−12	55
Daniel Sprong	76	18	25	43	–5	22
Moritz Seider	82	9	33	42	–7	51
Michael Rasmussen	75	13	20	33	+8	47
Andrew Copp	79	13	20	33	-2	26
Robby Fabbri	68	18	14	32	–13	32
Joe Veleno	80	12	16	28	–16	25
Jeff Petry	73	3	21	24	–7	39
Jake Walman	63	12	9	21	–2	44
Ben Chiarot	77	5	15	20	–4	56
Christian Fischer	79	5	14	19	+0	36
Olli Maatta	72	4	14	18	+14	14
Jonatan Berggren	12	2	4	6	–1	2
Justin Holl	38	0	5	5	+8	22
Klim Kostin^{‡}	33	3	1	4	–2	38
Simon Edvinsson	16	1	1	2	+0	4
Austin Czarnik	34	0	1	1	−3	12
Zach Aston-Reese	3	0	0	0	+0	2

=== Goaltenders ===
Regular season
Player	GP	GS	TOI	W	L	OT	GA	GAA	SA	SV%	SO	G	A	PIM
Alex Lyon	44	43	2,498:51	21	18	5	127	3.05	1198	.904	2	0	1	2
Ville Husso	19	18	1,012:55	9	5	2	60	3.55	556	.892	0	0	1	0
James Reimer	25	20	1352:24	11	8	2	60	3.11	727	.904	2	0	0	4
Michael Hutchinson	1	1	57:48	0	1	0	3	3.11	36	.917	0	0	0	0

^{‡}Denotes player was traded mid-season. Stats reflect time with the Red Wings only.

== Awards and honours ==
=== Awards ===
Regular season
Player	Award	Awarded
Alex DeBrincat	NHL First Star of the Week	October 23, 2023

== Transactions ==
The Red Wings have been involved in the following transactions during the 2023–24 season.

=== Trades ===
Date	Details		Ref
June 29, 2023	To Edmonton Oilers Future considerations	To Detroit Red Wings Klim Kostin; Kailer Yamamoto	
July 9, 2023	To Ottawa Senators Dominik Kubalik; Donovan Sebrango; Conditional 1st-round pick in 2024; 4th-round pick in 2024	To Detroit Red Wings Alex DeBrincat	
March 8, 2024	To San Jose Sharks Klim Kostin	To Detroit Red Wings Radim Simek; 7th-round pick in 2024	

=== Free agents ===
Date	Player	Team	Contract term	Ref
July 1, 2023	Justin Holl	from Toronto Maple Leafs	3-year	
July 1, 2023	James Reimer	from San Jose Sharks	1-year	
July 1, 2023	Daniel Sprong	from Seattle Kraken	1-year	
July 1, 2023	Brogan Rafferty	from Coachella Valley Firebirds	2-year	
July 1, 2023	Alex Lyon	from Florida Panthers	2-year	
July 1, 2023	Tim Gettinger	from Hartford Wolf Pack	1-year	
July 1, 2023	Alex Nedeljkovic	to Pittsburgh Penguins	1-year	
July 1, 2023	Shayne Gostisbehere	from Carolina Hurricanes	1-year	
July 1, 2023	J. T. Compher	from Colorado Avalanche	5-year	
July 2, 2023	Christian Fischer	from Arizona Coyotes	1-year	
July 2, 2023	Magnus Hellberg	to Pittsburgh Penguins	1-year	
July 2, 2023	Jordan Oesterle	to Calgary Flames	1-year	
July 2, 2023	Kailer Yamamoto	to Seattle Kraken	1-year	
July 3, 2023	Jasper Weatherby	to Nashville Predators	1-year	
July 3, 2023	Nolan Stevens	from Utica Comets	1-year	
July 4, 2023	Robert Hagg	to Anaheim Ducks	1-year	
July 10, 2023	Filip Zadina	to San Jose Sharks	1-year	
October 8, 2023	Zach Aston-Reese	from Toronto Maple Leafs	1-year	
November 28, 2023	Patrick Kane	from New York Rangers	1-year	
December 19, 2023	Michael Hutchinson	from Grand Rapids Griffins	1-year	

=== Contract terminations ===
Date	Player	Via	Ref
July 1, 2023	Kailer Yamamoto	Buyout	
July 7, 2023	Filip Zadina	Contact termination	
February 12, 2024	Nolan Stevens	Contact termination	

=== Signings ===
Date	Player	Contract term	Ref
July 1, 2023	Klim Kostin	2-year	
July 1, 2023	Matt Luff	1-year	
July 1, 2023	Gustav Lindstrom	1-year	
July 8, 2023	John Lethemon	1-year	
July 12, 2023	Nate Danielson	3-year	
February 20, 2024	Michael Rasmussen	4-year	
March 11, 2024	Tim Gettinger	1-year	

== Draft picks ==
Below are the Detroit Red Wings' selections at the 2023 NHL entry draft, which was held on June 28 and 29, 2023, at the Bridgestone Arena in Nashville, Tennessee.

Round	#	Player	Pos	Nationality	College/Junior/Club Team (League)
1	9	Nate Danielson	C	Canada	Brandon Wheat Kings (WHL)
1	17^{1}	Axel Sandin Pellikka	D	Sweden	Skellefteå AIK (SHL)
2	41	Trey Augustine	G	United States	Michigan State (Big Ten)
2	42^{2}	Andrew Gibson	D	Canada	Sault Ste. Marie Greyhounds (OHL)
2	47^{3}	Brady Cleveland	D	United States	U.S. NTDP (USHL)
3	73	Noah Dower Nilsson	LW	Sweden	Frölunda HC (J20 SuperElit)
4	117^{4}	Larry Keenan	D	Canada	Culver Military Academy (USHS-Prep)
5	137	Jack Phelan	D	United States	Sioux Falls Stampede (USHL)
5	147	Kevin Bicker	LW	Germany	Adler Mannheim (DEL)
6	169	Rudy Guimond	G	Canada	Taft School (USHS-Prep)
7	201	Emmitt Finnie	C	Canada	Kamloops Blazers (WHL)

Notes:

1. The New York Islanders' first-round pick went to the Detroit Red Wings as the result of a trade on March 1, 2023, that sent Filip Hronek and a fourth-round pick in 2023 to Vancouver in exchange for a second-round pick in 2023 and this pick (being conditional at the time of the trade). The condition – Detroit will receive the Islanders' first-round pick in 2023 if the Islanders' first-round pick in 2023 is outside of the top twelve selections – was converted when the Islanders qualified for the 2023 Stanley Cup playoffs on April 12, 2023.
2. The St. Louis Blues' second-round pick will go to the Detroit Red Wings as the result of a trade on March 21, 2022, that sent Nick Leddy and Luke Witkowski to St. Louis in exchange for Oskar Sundqvist, Jake Walman and this pick.
3. The Nashville Predators' second-round pick went to the Detroit Red Wings as the result of a trade on June 29, 2023, that sent a second-round pick in 2023, and a fifth-round pick in 2023 in exchange for this pick.
4. The Vancouver Canucks' second-round pick will go to the Detroit Red Wings as the result of a trade on March 1, 2023, that sent Filip Hronek and a fourth-round pick in 2023 to Vancouver in exchange for the Islanders' conditional first-round in 2023 and this pick.
5. The Minnesota Wild's fourth-round pick will go to the Detroit Red Wings as the result of a trade on March 3, 2023, that sent Oskar Sundqvist to Minnesota in exchange for this pick.
