= 2023–24 Washington Capitals season =

National Hockey League season

2023–24 Washington Capitals
- Division: 4th Metropolitan
- Conference: 8th Eastern
- 2023–24 record: 40–31–11
- Home record: 22–12–7
- Road record: 18–19–4
- Goals for: 220
- Goals against: 257

Team information
- General manager: Brian MacLellan
- Coach: Spencer Carbery
- Captain: Alexander Ovechkin
- Alternate captains: Nicklas Backstrom; John Carlson; T. J. Oshie; Tom Wilson
- Arena: Capital One Arena
- Average attendance: 17,841
- Minor league affiliates: Hershey Bears (AHL); South Carolina Stingrays (ECHL)

Team leaders
- Goals: Alexander Ovechkin (31)
- Assists: John Carlson (42)
- Points: Dylan Strome (67)
- Penalty minutes: Tom Wilson (133)
- Plus/minus: Anthony Mantha (+5)
- Wins: Charlie Lindgren (25)
- Goals against average: Charlie Lindgren (2.67)

The 2023–24 Washington Capitals season was the 50th season (49th season of play) for the National Hockey League (NHL) franchise that was established on June 11, 1974.

The Capitals returned to the playoffs after missing them for the first time since 2013–14 season (and only the second time since 2006–07), ending their eight-season playoff streak, and attempted to win the team's second Stanley Cup and their first since 2018. The Capitals clinched the final playoff spot in the Eastern Conference on April 16, 2024, following a 2–1 victory over the Philadelphia Flyers. The 91 point total is the lowest point to make the playoffs in the east since the 2009–10 Philadelphia Flyers and the 2009–10 Montreal Canadiens. During the playoffs, the Capitals faced a first round sweep by the Presidents' Trophy-winning New York Rangers, marking the first occurrence of such an event in franchise history.

== Standings ==
=== Divisional standings ===
Metropolitan Division
Pos	Team	GP	W	L	OTL	RW	GF	GA	GD	Pts
1	p – New York Rangers	82	55	23	4	43	282	229	+53	114
2	x – Carolina Hurricanes	82	52	23	7	44	279	216	+63	111
3	x – New York Islanders	82	39	27	16	29	246	263	−17	94
4	x – Washington Capitals	82	40	31	11	32	220	257	−37	91
5	Pittsburgh Penguins	82	38	32	12	32	255	251	+4	88
6	Philadelphia Flyers	82	38	33	11	30	235	261	−26	87
7	New Jersey Devils	82	38	39	5	33	264	283	−19	81
8	Columbus Blue Jackets	82	27	43	12	21	237	300	−63	66

Source: National Hockey League
Rules for classification: 1) Fewer number of games played (GP, only during regular season); 2) Greater number of regulation wins (RW); 3) Greater number of wins in regulation and overtime, excluding shootout wins (ROW); 4) Greater number of total wins, including shootouts (W); 5) Greater number of points earned in head-to-head play; if teams played an uneven number of head-to-head games, the result of the first game on the home ice of the team with the extra home game is discarded; 6) Greater goal differential (GD); 7) Greater number of goals scored (GF)
p – Clinched Presidents' Trophy; x – Clinched playoff spot

=== Conference standings ===
Eastern Conference Wild Card
Pos	Div	Team	GP	W	L	OTL	RW	GF	GA	GD	Pts
1	AT	x – Tampa Bay Lightning	82	45	29	8	37	291	268	+23	98
2	ME	x – Washington Capitals	82	40	31	11	32	220	257	−37	91
3	AT	Detroit Red Wings	82	41	32	9	27	278	274	+4	91
4	ME	Pittsburgh Penguins	82	38	32	12	32	255	251	+4	88
5	ME	Philadelphia Flyers	82	38	33	11	30	235	261	−26	87
6	AT	Buffalo Sabres	82	39	37	6	33	246	244	+2	84
7	ME	New Jersey Devils	82	38	39	5	33	264	283	−19	81
8	AT	Ottawa Senators	82	37	41	4	25	255	281	−26	78
9	AT	Montreal Canadiens	82	30	36	16	20	236	289	−53	76
10	ME	Columbus Blue Jackets	82	27	43	12	21	237	300	−63	66

Source: National Hockey League
Rules for classification: 1) Fewer number of games played (GP, only during regular season); 2) Greater number of regulation wins (RW); 3) Greater number of wins in regulation and overtime, excluding shootout wins (ROW); 4) Greater number of total wins, including shootouts (W); 5) Greater number of points earned in head-to-head play; if teams played an uneven number of head-to-head games, the result of the first game on the home ice of the team with the extra home game is discarded; 6) Greater goal differential (GD); 7) Greater number of goals scored (GF)
x – Clinched playoff spot

== Schedule and results ==
=== Preseason ===
The preseason schedule was released on June 21, 2023.

2023 preseason game log: 3–2–1 (Home: 1–1–1; Road: 2–1–0)

#	Date	Visitor	Score	Home	OT	Decision	Location	Attendance	Record
1	September 24	Buffalo	4–3	Washington	SO	Stevenson	Capital One Arena	12,638	0–0–1
2	September 28	Detroit	3–4	Washington		Lindgren	Capital One Arena	12,746	1–0–1
3	September 30	Washington	2–5	Detroit		Shepard	Little Caesars Arena	11,050	1–1–1
4	October 3	Washington	5–4	Boston	OT	Kuemper	TD Garden	17,565	2–1–1
5	October 5	Washington	4–2	Columbus		Lindgren	Nationwide Arena	11,491	3–1–1
6	October 7	Columbus	4–2	Washington		Kuemper	Capital One Arena	12,961	3–2–1

Legend:

Win Loss Overtime/shootout loss

=== Regular season ===
2023–24 game log
October: 4–3–1 (Home: 3–2–0; Road: 1–1–1)

#	Date	Visitor	Score	Home	OT	Decision	Location	Attendance	Record	Points	Recap
1	October 13	Pittsburgh	4–0	Washington		Lindgren	Capital One Arena	18,573	0–1–0	0	
2	October 16	Calgary	2–3	Washington	SO	Kuemper	Capital One Arena	16,489	1–1–0	2	
3	October 18	Washington	1–6	Ottawa		Kuemper	Canadian Tire Centre	15,021	1–2–0	2	
4	October 21	Washington	2–3	Montreal	OT	Kuemper	Bell Centre	21,105	1–2–1	3	
5	October 24	Toronto	4–1	Washington		Kuemper	Capital One Arena	16,641	1–3–1	3	
6	October 25	Washington	6–4	New Jersey		Shepard	Prudential Center	16,117	2–3–1	5	
7	October 27	Minnesota	2–3	Washington	SO	Kuemper	Capital One Arena	16,602	3–3–1	7	
8	October 29	San Jose	1–3	Washington		Kuemper	Capital One Arena	15,856	4–3–1	9	

November: 8–3–1 (Home: 4–2–1; Road: 4–1–0)

#	Date	Visitor	Score	Home	OT	Decision	Location	Attendance	Record	Points	Recap
9	November 2	NY Islanders	3–0	Washington		Kuemper	Capital One Arena	16,209	4–4–1	9	
10	November 4	Columbus	1–2	Washington		Lindgren	Capital One Arena	18,573	5–4–1	11	
11	November 8	Florida	4–3	Washington	OT	Kuemper	Capital One Arena	16,104	5–4–2	12	
12	November 10	Washington	4–2	New Jersey		Lindgren	Prudential Center	16,514	6–4–2	14	
13	November 11	Washington	4–1	NY Islanders		Shepard	UBS Arena	16,519	7–4–2	16	
14	November 14	Vegas	0–3	Washington		Lindgren	Capital One Arena	16,598	8–4–2	18	
15	November 18	Columbus	3–4	Washington		Lindgren	Capital One Arena	18,573	9–4–2	20	
16	November 22	Buffalo	3–4	Washington	OT	Kuemper	Capital One Arena	18,573	10–4–2	22	
17	November 24	Edmonton	5–0	Washington		Lindgren	Capital One Arena	18,573	10–5–2	22	
18	November 27	Washington	1–2	San Jose		Kuemper	SAP Center	10,759	10–6–2	22	
19	November 29	Washington	2–1	Los Angeles		Lindgren	Crypto.com Arena	18,145	11–6–2	24	
20	November 30	Washington	5–4	Anaheim		Kuemper	Honda Center	14,336	12–6–2	26	

December: 5–5–4 (Home: 2–0–3; Road: 3–5–1)

#	Date	Visitor	Score	Home	OT	Decision	Location	Attendance	Record	Points	Recap
21	December 2	Washington	1–4	Vegas		Kuemper	T-Mobile Arena	18,140	12–7–2	26	
22	December 4	Washington	0–6	Arizona		Kuemper	Mullett Arena	4,600	12–8–2	26	
23	December 7	Dallas	5–4	Washington	SO	Lindgren	Capital One Arena	15,850	12–8–3	27	
24	December 9	NY Rangers	0–4	Washington		Lindgren	Capital One Arena	18,573	13–8–3	29	
25	December 10	Washington	4–2	Chicago		Kuemper	United Center	18,258	14–8–3	31	
26	December 14	Washington	3–4	Philadelphia	SO	Lindgren	Wells Fargo Center	18,557	14–8–4	32	
27	December 16	Washington	1–3	Nashville		Lindgren	Bridgestone Arena	17,267	14–9–4	32	
28	December 17	Washington	2–1	Carolina	SO	Kuemper	PNC Arena	18,700	15–9–4	34	
29	December 20	NY Islanders	2–3	Washington	OT	Kuemper	Capital One Arena	18,573	16–9–4	36	
30	December 21	Washington	3–2	Columbus	OT	Lindgren	Nationwide Arena	18,172	17–9–4	38	
31	December 23	Tampa Bay	2–1	Washington	SO	Lindgren	Capital One Arena	18,573	17–9–5	39	
32	December 27	Washington	1–5	NY Rangers		Kuemper	Madison Square Garden	18,006	17–10–5	39	
33	December 29	Washington	1–5	NY Islanders		Kuemper	UBS Arena	17,255	17–11–5	39	
34	December 30	Nashville	3–2	Washington	SO	Shepard	Capital One Arena	18,573	17–11–6	40	

January: 5–7–1 (Home: 4–3–0; Road: 1–4–1)

#	Date	Visitor	Score	Home	OT	Decision	Location	Attendance	Record	Points	Recap
35	January 2	Washington	4–3	Pittsburgh		Kuemper	PPG Paints Arena	18,190	18–11–6	42	
36	January 3	New Jersey	6–3	Washington		Shepard	Capital One Arena	17,156	18–12–6	42	
37	January 5	Carolina	6–2	Washington		Kuemper	Capital One Arena	18,573	18–13–6	42	
38	January 7	Los Angeles	3–4	Washington		Kuemper	Capital One Arena	18,573	19–13–6	44	
39	January 11	Seattle	4–1	Washington		Kuemper	Capital One Arena	17,935	19–14–6	44	
40	January 13	NY Rangers	2–3	Washington		Lindgren	Capital One Arena	18,573	20–14–6	46	
41	January 14	Washington	1–2	NY Rangers		Lindgren	Madison Square Garden	18,006	20–15–6	46	
42	January 16	Anaheim	0–2	Washington		Kuemper	Capital One Arena	15,961	21–15–6	48	
43	January 18	St. Louis	2–5	Washington		Lindgren	Capital One Arena	17,909	22–15–6	50	
44	January 20	Washington	0–3	St. Louis		Lindgren	Enterprise Center	18,096	22–16–6	50	
45	January 23	Washington	3–5	Minnesota		Kuemper	Xcel Energy Center	18,437	22–17–6	50	
46	January 24	Washington	2–6	Colorado		Lindgren	Ball Arena	18,136	22–18–6	50	
47	January 27	Washington	4–5	Dallas	OT	Lindgren	American Airlines Center	18,532	22–18–7	51	

February: 5–4–2 (Home: 2–2–1; Road: 3–2–1)

#	Date	Visitor	Score	Home	OT	Decision	Location	Attendance	Record	Points	Recap
48	February 6	Montreal	5–2	Washington		Lindgren	Capital One Arena	16,959	22–19–7	51	
49	February 8	Washington	2–4	Florida		Kuemper	Amerant Bank Arena	17,645	22–20–7	51	
50	February 10	Washington	3–0	Boston		Lindgren	TD Garden	17,850	23–20–7	53	
51	February 11	Vancouver	3–2	Washington	OT	Kuemper	Capital One Arena	18,573	23–20–8	54	
52	February 13	Colorado	6–3	Washington		Lindgren	Capital One Arena	17,878	23–21–8	54	
53	February 17	Washington	4–3	Montreal		Kuemper	Bell Centre	21,105	24–21–8	56	
54	February 20	New Jersey	2–6	Washington		Lindgren	Capital One Arena	17,232	25–21–8	58	
55	February 22	Washington	5–3	Tampa Bay		Lindgren	Amalie Arena	19,092	26–21–8	60	
56	February 24	Washington	2–3	Florida	OT	Lindgren	Amerant Bank Arena	19,887	26–21–9	61	
57	February 26	Ottawa	3–6	Washington		Kuemper	Capital One Arena	17,296	27–21–9	63	
58	February 27	Washington	3–8	Detroit		Lindgren	Little Caesars Arena	19,515	27–22–9	63	

March: 9–5–1 (Home: 5–2–1; Road: 4–3–0)

#	Date	Visitor	Score	Home	OT	Decision	Location	Attendance	Record	Points	Recap
59	March 1	Philadelphia	2–5	Washington		Lindgren	Capital One Arena	18,573	28–22–9	65	
60	March 3	Arizona	5–2	Washington		Lindgren	Capital One Arena	18,573	28–23–9	65	
61	March 7	Washington	6–0	Pittsburgh		Lindgren	PPG Paints Arena	17,093	29–23–9	67	
62	March 9	Chicago	1–4	Washington		Lindgren	Capital One Arena	18,573	30–23–9	69	
63	March 11	Washington	0–3	Winnipeg		Lindgren	Canada Life Centre	13,716	30–24–9	69	
64	March 13	Washington	2–7	Edmonton		Kuemper	Rogers Place	18,347	30–25–9	69	
65	March 14	Washington	2–1	Seattle		Lindgren	Climate Pledge Arena	17,151	31–25–9	71	
66	March 16	Washington	2–1	Vancouver		Lindgren	Rogers Arena	18,859	32–25–9	73	
67	March 18	Washington	5–2	Calgary		Lindgren	Scotiabank Saddledome	16,793	33–25–9	75	
68	March 20	Toronto	7–3	Washington		Lindgren	Capital One Arena	17,727	33–26–9	75	
69	March 22	Carolina	6–7	Washington	SO	Lindgren	Capital One Arena	18,573	34–26–9	77	
70	March 24	Winnipeg	0–3	Washington		Lindgren	Capital One Arena	18,573	35–26–9	79	
71	March 26	Detroit	3–4	Washington	OT	Lindgren	Capital One Arena	18,573	36–26–9	81	
72	March 28	Washington	1–5	Toronto		Lindgren	Scotiabank Arena	18,577	36–27–9	81	
73	March 30	Boston	3–2	Washington	SO	Lindgren	Capital One Arena	18,573	36–27–10	82	

April: 4–4–1 (Home: 2–1–1; Road: 2–3–0)

#	Date	Visitor	Score	Home	OT	Decision	Location	Attendance	Record	Points	Recap
74	April 2	Washington	2–6	Buffalo		Lindgren	KeyBank Center	14,390	36–28–10	82	
75	April 4	Pittsburgh	4–1	Washington		Lindgren	Capital One Arena	18,573	36–29–10	82	
76	April 5	Washington	2–4	Carolina		Kuemper	PNC Arena	18,724	36–30–10	82	
77	April 7	Ottawa	3–2	Washington	OT	Lindgren	Capital One Arena	17,902	36–30–11	83	
78	April 9	Washington	2–1	Detroit		Lindgren	Little Caesars Arena	19,515	37–30–11	85	
79	April 11	Washington	2–4	Buffalo		Lindgren	KeyBank Center	15,454	37–31–11	85	
80	April 13	Tampa Bay	2–4	Washington		Lindgren	Capital One Arena	18,573	38–31–11	87	
81	April 15	Boston	0–2	Washington		Lindgren	Capital One Arena	18,573	39–31–11	89	
82	April 16	Washington	2–1	Philadelphia		Lindgren	Wells Fargo Center	19,411	40–31–11	91	

Win (2 Points) Loss (0 points) Overtime/shootout loss (1 point)

=== Playoffs ===
2024 Stanley Cup Playoffs
Eastern Conference first round vs. (M1) New York Rangers: New York won 4–0

#	Date	Visitor	Score	Home	OT	Decision	Attendance	Series	Recap
1	April 21	Washington	1–4	NY Rangers		Lindgren	18,006	0–1	
2	April 23	Washington	3–4	NY Rangers		Lindgren	18,006	0–2	
3	April 26	NY Rangers	3–1	Washington		Lindgren	18,573	0–3	
4	April 28	NY Rangers	4–2	Washington		Lindgren	18,573	0–4	

Win Loss

== Player stats ==
As of April 28, 2024

=== Skaters ===
Regular season
Player	GP	G	A	Pts	+/−	PIM
Dylan Strome	82	27	40	67	−13	22
Alexander Ovechkin	79	31	34	65	−22	20
John Carlson	82	10	42	52	–7	40
Anthony Mantha^{‡}	56	20	14	34	+5	17
Tom Wilson	74	18	17	35	−19	133
Connor McMichael	80	18	15	33	–20	34
Aliaksei Protas	78	6	23	29	–3	8
T. J. Oshie	52	12	13	25	–6	44
Sonny Milano	49	15	8	23	+4	10
Max Pacioretty	47	4	19	23	–14	25
Rasmus Sandin	68	3	20	23	–13	24
Nic Dowd	64	12	10	22	–2	47
Hendrix Lapierre	51	8	14	22	−1	4
Beck Malenstyn	81	6	15	21	−1	25
Evgeny Kuznetsov^{‡}	43	6	11	17	–11	24
Nicolas Aube-Kubel	60	6	10	16	+4	23
Martin Fehervary	66	3	13	16	–7	24
Nick Jensen	78	1	13	14	−9	10
Trevor van Riemsdyk	70	0	14	14	–7	18
Michael Sgarbossa	25	4	3	7	0	2
Ivan Miroshnichenko	21	2	4	6	–4	6
Joel Edmundson^{‡}	44	1	5	6	–5	19
Matthew Phillips	28	1	4	5	–3	0
Ethan Bear	24	1	3	4	–5	10
Alexander Alexeyev	39	1	2	3	−8	6
Dylan McIlrath	3	0	1	1	+1	5
Hardy Haman Aktell	6	0	1	1	–2	2
Lucas Johansen	6	0	1	1	+1	4
Nicklas Backstrom	8	0	1	1	−3	2
Pierrick Dube	3	0	0	0	+1	2
Joe Snively	3	0	0	0	–1	0
Vincent Iorio	6	0	0	0	+1	0

Playoffs
Player	GP	G	A	Pts	+/−	PIM
Martin Fehervary	4	2	1	3	0	2
Tom Wilson	4	1	2	3	+1	16
John Carlson	4	1	1	2	–1	2
Hendrix Lapierre	4	1	1	2	−2	0
Dylan Strome	4	1	1	2	−1	0
Aliaksei Protas	4	0	2	2	+1	0
Connor McMichael	4	1	0	1	–3	2
Alexander Alexeyev	4	0	1	1	−2	4
T. J. Oshie	4	0	1	1	–2	4
Max Pacioretty	4	0	1	1	–2	2
Vincent Iorio	1	0	0	0	−1	0
Nick Jensen	1	0	0	0	−1	2
Ivan Miroshnichenko	1	0	0	0	0	0
Rasmus Sandin	1	0	0	0	0	2
Lucas Johansen	2	0	0	0	0	0
Nicolas Aube-Kubel	3	0	0	0	−1	2
Sonny Milano	4	0	0	0	−2	0
Alexander Ovechkin	4	0	0	0	−2	0
Trevor van Riemsdyk	3	0	0	0	–3	0
Nic Dowd	4	0	0	0	0	6
Beck Malenstyn	4	0	0	0	−1	2
Dylan McIlrath	4	0	0	0	+2	10

=== Goaltenders ===
Regular season
Player	GP	GS	TOI	W	L	OT	GA	GAA	SA	SV%	SO	G	A	PIM
Charlie Lindgren	50	48	2,852:23	25	16	7	127	2.67	1,431	.911	6	0	0	0
Darcy Kuemper	33	30	1,866:32	13	14	3	103	3.31	940	.890	1	0	1	0
Hunter Shepard	4	4	244:50	2	1	1	13	3.19	123	.894	0	0	0	0

Playoffs
Player	GP	GS	TOI	W	L	GA	GAA	SA	SV%	SO	G	A	PIM
Charlie Lindgren	4	4	234:31	0	4	14	3.58	103	.864	0	0	0	0

^{†}Denotes player spent time with another team before joining the Capitals. Stats reflect time with the Capitals only.
^{‡}No longer with the Capitals.

== Transactions ==
The Capitals have been involved in the following transactions during the 2023–24 season.

Key:

† Contract is entry-level.
‡ Contract initially takes effect in the 2024–25 season.

=== Trades ===
Date	Details		Ref
June 29, 2023	To San Jose Sharks 7th-round pick in 2025	To Washington Capitals PIT 7th-round pick in 2023	
July 1, 2023	To Montreal Canadiens MIN 3rd-round pick in 2024; 7th-round pick in 2024	To Washington Capitals Joel Edmundson (50% retained)	
March 5, 2024	To Vegas Golden Knights Anthony Mantha (50% retained)	To Washington Capitals 2nd-round pick in 2024; 4th-round pick in 2026	
March 7, 2024	To Toronto Maple Leafs Joel Edmundson (50% retained)	To Washington Capitals NYI 3rd-round pick in 2024; CHI 5th-round pick in 2025	
March 8, 2024	To Carolina Hurricanes Evgeny Kuznetsov (50% retained)	To Washington Capitals 3rd-round pick in 2025	
June 19, 2024	To Los Angeles Kings Darcy Kuemper	To Washington Capitals Pierre-Luc Dubois	
June 27, 2024	To Calgary Flames COL 2nd-round pick in 2025	To Washington Capitals Andrew Mangiapane	

=== Players acquired ===
Date	Player	Former team	Term	Via	Ref
July 1, 2023	Max Pacioretty	Carolina Hurricanes	1-year	Free agency	
July 2, 2023	Pierrick Dube	Laval Rocket (AHL)	2-year†	Free agency	
July 2, 2023	Matthew Phillips	Calgary Flames	1-year	Free agency	
July 3, 2023	Alex Limoges	Winnipeg Jets	1-year	Free agency	
July 5, 2023	Chase Priskie	Anaheim Ducks	1-year	Free agency	
December 28, 2023	Ethan Bear	Vancouver Canucks	2-year	Free agency	
March 5, 2024	Matthew Phillips	Pittsburgh Penguins		Waivers	

=== Players lost ===
Date	Player	New team	Term	Via	Ref
July 1, 2023	Connor Brown	Edmonton Oilers	1-year	Free-agency	
July 1, 2023	Matt Irwin	Vancouver Canucks	1-year	Free-agency	
July 1, 2023	Garrett Pilon	Ottawa Senators	1-year	Free-agency	
July 1, 2023	Conor Sheary	Tampa Bay Lightning	3-year	Free-agency	
July 1, 2023	Craig Smith	Dallas Stars	1-year	Free-agency	
July 6, 2023	Zachary Fucale	Traktor Chelyabinsk (KHL)	2-year	Free-agency	
July 28, 2023	Gabriel Carlsson	Växjö Lakers (SHL)	3-year	Free-agency	
July 31, 2023	Bobby Nardella	HV71 (SHL)	1-year	Free-agency	
February 16, 2024	Matthew Phillips	Pittsburgh Penguins		Waivers	

=== Signings ===
Date	Player	Term	Ref
July 2, 2023	Hunter Shepard	1-year	
July 2, 2023	Dylan McIlrath	2-year	
July 4, 2023	Martin Fehervary	3-year	
July 4, 2023	Riley Sutter	1-year	
July 7, 2023	Andrew Cristall	3-year†	
August 4, 2023	Tom Wilson	7-year‡	
December 12, 2023	Clay Stevenson	2-year‡	
March 6, 2024	Rasmus Sandin	5-year	

== Draft picks ==
Below are the Washington Capitals selections at 2023 NHL entry draft, which was on June 28 and 29, 2023, at Bridgestone Arena in Nashville, Tennessee.

Round	#	Player	Pos	Nationality	College/Junior/Club team (League)
1	8	Ryan Leonard	RW	United States	U.S NTDP (USHL)
2	40	Andrew Cristall	LW	Canada	Kelowna Rockets (WHL)
4	104	Patrick Thomas	C	Canada	Hamilton Bulldogs (OHL)
5	136	Cameron Allen	D	Canada	Guelph Storm (OHL)
7	200	Brett Hyland	C	Canada	Brandon Wheat Kings (WHL)
