= 2023–24 Carolina Hurricanes season =

Season of play of professional ice hockey team

2023–24 Carolina Hurricanes
- Division: 2nd Metropolitan
- Conference: 2nd Eastern
- 2023–24 record: 52–23–7
- Home record: 27–10–4
- Road record: 25–13–3
- Goals for: 279
- Goals against: 216

Team information
- General manager: Don Waddell
- Coach: Rod Brind'Amour
- Captain: Jordan Staal
- Alternate captains: Sebastian Aho; Jordan Martinook; Jaccob Slavin
- Arena: PNC Arena
- Average attendance: 18,798
- Minor league affiliate: None (Note: The Hurricanes have a "working agreement" with the Norfolk Admirals, making them a de facto ECHL affiliate. In the AHL, the Hurricanes have reassigned players to minor league affiliates of other teams on a player-by-player basis.)

Team leaders
- Goals: Sebastian Aho (36)
- Assists: Sebastian Aho (53)
- Points: Sebastian Aho (89)
- Penalty minutes: Brendan Lemieux (64)
- Plus/minus: Sebastian Aho (+34)
- Wins: Pyotr Kochetkov (23)
- Goals against average: Yaniv Perets (0.00)

The 2023–24 Carolina Hurricanes season was the 45th season (44th season of play) for the National Hockey League (NHL) franchise that was established in June 1979, and the 26th season since the franchise relocated from the Hartford Whalers to start the 1997–98 season.

On March 28, 2024, the Hurricanes clinched a playoff berth for the sixth consecutive season after a 4–0 win against the Detroit Red Wings.

On April 9, the Hurricanes clinched their third consecutive 50-win season. In the playoffs, they defeated the New York Islanders in five games in the first round, and faced the New York Rangers in the second round. However, their season came to an end when they lost in six games despite staving off elimination in the fourth and fifth games.

== Standings ==
=== Divisional standings ===
Metropolitan Division
| Pos | Team | GP | W | L | OTL | RW | GF | GA | GD | Pts |
|---|---|---|---|---|---|---|---|---|---|---|
| 1 | p – New York Rangers | 82 | 55 | 23 | 4 | 43 | 282 | 229 | +53 | 114 |
| 2 | x – Carolina Hurricanes | 82 | 52 | 23 | 7 | 44 | 279 | 216 | +63 | 111 |
| 3 | x – New York Islanders | 82 | 39 | 27 | 16 | 29 | 246 | 263 | −17 | 94 |
| 4 | x – Washington Capitals | 82 | 40 | 31 | 11 | 32 | 220 | 257 | −37 | 91 |
| 5 | Pittsburgh Penguins | 82 | 38 | 32 | 12 | 32 | 255 | 251 | +4 | 88 |
| 6 | Philadelphia Flyers | 82 | 38 | 33 | 11 | 30 | 235 | 261 | −26 | 87 |
| 7 | New Jersey Devils | 82 | 38 | 39 | 5 | 33 | 264 | 283 | −19 | 81 |
| 8 | Columbus Blue Jackets | 82 | 27 | 43 | 12 | 21 | 237 | 300 | −63 | 66 |

Source: National Hockey League
Rules for classification: 1) Fewer number of games played (GP, only during regular season); 2) Greater number of regulation wins (RW); 3) Greater number of wins in regulation and overtime, excluding shootout wins (ROW); 4) Greater number of total wins, including shootouts (W); 5) Greater number of points earned in head-to-head play; if teams played an uneven number of head-to-head games, the result of the first game on the home ice of the team with the extra home game is discarded; 6) Greater goal differential (GD); 7) Greater number of goals scored (GF)
p – Clinched Presidents' Trophy; x – Clinched playoff spot

=== Conference standings ===
Eastern Conference Wild Card
| Pos | Div | Team | GP | W | L | OTL | RW | GF | GA | GD | Pts |
|---|---|---|---|---|---|---|---|---|---|---|---|
| 1 | AT | x – Tampa Bay Lightning | 82 | 45 | 29 | 8 | 37 | 291 | 268 | +23 | 98 |
| 2 | ME | x – Washington Capitals | 82 | 40 | 31 | 11 | 32 | 220 | 257 | −37 | 91 |
| 3 | AT | Detroit Red Wings | 82 | 41 | 32 | 9 | 27 | 278 | 274 | +4 | 91 |
| 4 | ME | Pittsburgh Penguins | 82 | 38 | 32 | 12 | 32 | 255 | 251 | +4 | 88 |
| 5 | ME | Philadelphia Flyers | 82 | 38 | 33 | 11 | 30 | 235 | 261 | −26 | 87 |
| 6 | AT | Buffalo Sabres | 82 | 39 | 37 | 6 | 33 | 246 | 244 | +2 | 84 |
| 7 | ME | New Jersey Devils | 82 | 38 | 39 | 5 | 33 | 264 | 283 | −19 | 81 |
| 8 | AT | Ottawa Senators | 82 | 37 | 41 | 4 | 25 | 255 | 281 | −26 | 78 |
| 9 | AT | Montreal Canadiens | 82 | 30 | 36 | 16 | 20 | 236 | 289 | −53 | 76 |
| 10 | ME | Columbus Blue Jackets | 82 | 27 | 43 | 12 | 21 | 237 | 300 | −63 | 66 |

Source: National Hockey League
Rules for classification: 1) Fewer number of games played (GP, only during regular season); 2) Greater number of regulation wins (RW); 3) Greater number of wins in regulation and overtime, excluding shootout wins (ROW); 4) Greater number of total wins, including shootouts (W); 5) Greater number of points earned in head-to-head play; if teams played an uneven number of head-to-head games, the result of the first game on the home ice of the team with the extra home game is discarded; 6) Greater goal differential (GD); 7) Greater number of goals scored (GF)
x – Clinched playoff spot

== Schedule and results ==
=== Preseason ===
The Carolina Hurricanes preseason schedule was released on June 23, 2023.

2023 preseason game log: 3–3–0 (Home: 3–0–0; Road: 0–3–0)

| Game | Date | Opponent | Score | OT | Decision | Location | Attendance | Record | Recap |
|---|---|---|---|---|---|---|---|---|---|
| 1 | September 26 | Tampa Bay | 5–2 | | Kochetkov | PNC Arena | 12,430 | 1–0–0 | |
| 2 | September 27 | Florida | 4–1 | | Perets | PNC Arena | 15,368 | 2–0–0 | |
| 3 | September 29 | @ Florida | 2–4 | | Kochetkov | Amerant Bank Arena | 8,869 | 2–1–0 | |
| 4 | September 29 | @ Tampa Bay | 0–4 | | Perets | Amalie Arena | 13,635 | 2–2–0 | |
| 5 | October 5 | @ Nashville | 1–5 | | Raanta | Bridgestone Arena | 17,159 | 2–3–0 | |
| 6 | October 6 | Nashville | 4–1 | | Andersen | PNC Arena | 14,886 | 3–3–0 | |

=== Regular season ===
The Carolina Hurricanes regular seasons schedule was released on June 27, 2023.

2023–24 game log
October: 6–4–0 (home: 3–0–0; road: 3–4–0)

| Game | Date | Opponent | Score | OT | Decision | Location | Attendance | Record | Points | Recap |
|---|---|---|---|---|---|---|---|---|---|---|
| 1 | October 11 | Ottawa | 5–3 | | Andersen | PNC Arena | 18,893 | 1–0–0 | 2 | |
| 2 | October 14 | @ Los Angeles | 6–5 | SO | Andersen | Crypto.com Arena | 17,517 | 2–0–0 | 4 | |
| 3 | October 15 | @ Anaheim | 3–6 | | Raanta | Honda Center | 17,278 | 2–1–0 | 4 | |
| 4 | October 17 | @ San Jose | 6–3 | | Raanta | SAP Center | 10,378 | 3–1–0 | 6 | |
| 5 | October 19 | @ Seattle | 4–7 | | Kochetkov | Climate Pledge Arena | 17,151 | 3–2–0 | 6 | |
| 6 | October 21 | @ Colorado | 4–6 | | Kochetkov | Ball Arena | 18,131 | 3–3–0 | 6 | |
| 7 | October 24 | @ Tampa Bay | 0–3 | | Kochetkov | Amalie Arena | 19,092 | 3–4–0 | 6 | |
| 8 | October 26 | Seattle | 3–2 | OT | Andersen | PNC Arena | 18,780 | 4–4–0 | 8 | |
| 9 | October 27 | San Jose | 3–0 | | Raanta | PNC Arena | 18,700 | 5–4–0 | 10 | |
| 10 | October 30 | @ Philadelphia | 3–2 | | Andersen | Wells Fargo Center | 15,569 | 6–4–0 | 12 | |

November: 7–4–1 (home: 4–2–1; road: 3–2–0)

| Game | Date | Opponent | Score | OT | Decision | Location | Attendance | Record | Points | Recap |
|---|---|---|---|---|---|---|---|---|---|---|
| 11 | November 2 | @ NY Rangers | 1–2 | | Andersen | Madison Square Garden | 18,006 | 6–5–0 | 12 | |
| 12 | November 4 | @ NY Islanders | 4–3 | OT | Raanta | UBS Arena | 17,255 | 7–5–0 | 14 | |
| 13 | November 7 | Buffalo | 3–2 | OT | Raanta | PNC Arena | 18,700 | 8–5–0 | 16 | |
| 14 | November 10 | @ Florida | 2–5 | | Raanta | Amerant Bank Arena | 17,845 | 8–6–0 | 16 | |
| 15 | November 11 | @ Tampa Bay | 4–0 | | Kochetkov | Amalie Arena | 19,092 | 9–6–0 | 18 | |
| 16 | November 15 | Philadelphia | 1–3 | | Kochetkov | PNC Arena | 18,700 | 9–7–0 | 18 | |
| 17 | November 18 | Pittsburgh | 2–4 | | Raanta | PNC Arena | 18,700 | 10–7–0 | 20 | |
| 18 | November 22 | Edmonton | 6–3 | | Raanta | PNC Arena | 18,805 | 11–7–0 | 22 | |
| 19 | November 24 | Tampa Bay | 2–8 | | Raanta | PNC Arena | 18,802 | 11–8–0 | 22 | |
| 20 | November 26 | Columbus | 3–2 | | Kochetkov | PNC Arena | 18,700 | 12–8–0 | 24 | |
| 21 | November 28 | @ Philadelphia | 4–1 | | Kochetkov | Wells Fargo Center | 17,885 | 13–8–0 | 26 | |
| 22 | November 30 | NY Islanders | 4–5 | OT | Kochetkov | PNC Arena | 18,700 | 13–8–1 | 27 | |

December: 7–5–3 (home: 3–1–2; road: 4–4–1)

| Game | Date | Opponent | Score | OT | Decision | Location | Attendance | Record | Points | Recap |
|---|---|---|---|---|---|---|---|---|---|---|
| 23 | December 2 | Buffalo | 6–2 | | Kochetkov | PNC Arena | 18,797 | 14–8–1 | 29 | |
| 24 | December 4 | @ Winnipeg | 1–2 | | Raanta | Canada Life Centre | 11,468 | 14–9–1 | 29 | |
| 25 | December 6 | @ Edmonton | 1–6 | | Kochetkov | Rogers Place | 18,347 | 14–10–1 | 29 | |
| 26 | December 7 | @ Calgary | 2–3 | | Kochetkov | Scotiabank Saddledome | 16,983 | 14–11–1 | 29 | |
| 27 | December 9 | @ Vancouver | 3–4 | | Raanta | Rogers Arena | 18,586 | 14–12–1 | 29 | |
| 28 | December 12 | @ Ottawa | 4–1 | | Kochetkov | Canadian Tire Centre | 16,877 | 15–12–1 | 31 | |
| 29 | December 14 | @ Detroit | 2–1 | | Kochetkov | Little Caesars Arena | 19,515 | 16–12–1 | 33 | |
| 30 | December 15 | Nashville | 5–6 | OT | Raanta | PNC Arena | 18,770 | 16–12–2 | 34 | |
| 31 | December 17 | Washington | 1–2 | SO | Kochetkov | PNC Arena | 18,700 | 16–12–3 | 35 | |
| 32 | December 19 | Vegas | 6–3 | | Kochetkov | PNC Arena | 18,848 | 17–12–3 | 37 | |
| 33 | December 21 | @ Pittsburgh | 1–2 | SO | Kochetkov | PPG Paints Arena | 18,267 | 17–12–4 | 38 | |
| 34 | December 23 | NY Islanders | 4–5 | | Kochetkov | PNC Arena | 18,921 | 17–13–4 | 38 | |
| 35 | December 27 | @ Nashville | 5–2 | | Kochetkov | Bridgestone Arena | 17,846 | 18–13–4 | 40 | |
| 36 | December 28 | Montreal | 5–3 | | Raanta | PNC Arena | 18,969 | 19–13–4 | 42 | |
| 37 | December 30 | @ Toronto | 3–2 | | Kochetkov | Scotiabank Arena | 18,974 | 20–13–4 | 44 | |

January: 8–2–1 (home: 5–2–1; road: 3–0–0)

| Game | Date | Opponent | Score | OT | Decision | Location | Attendance | Record | Points | Recap |
|---|---|---|---|---|---|---|---|---|---|---|
| 38 | January 2 | @ NY Rangers | 6–1 | | Kochetkov | Madison Square Garden | 18,006 | 21–13–4 | 46 | |
| 39 | January 5 | @ Washington | 6–2 | | Kochetkov | Capital One Arena | 18,573 | 22–13–4 | 48 | |
| 40 | January 6 | St. Louis | 1–2 | SO | Raanta | PNC Arena | 18,903 | 22–13–5 | 49 | |
| 41 | January 11 | Anaheim | 6–3 | | Raanta | PNC Arena | 18,748 | 23–13–5 | 51 | |
| 42 | January 13 | Pittsburgh | 3–2 | OT | Raanta | PNC Arena | 18,932 | 24–13–5 | 53 | |
| 43 | January 15 | Los Angeles | 2–5 | | Raanta | PNC Arena | 18,825 | 24–14–5 | 53 | |
| 44 | January 19 | Detroit | 4–2 | | Raanta | PNC Arena | 18,841 | 25–14–5 | 55 | |
| 45 | January 21 | Minnesota | 2–5 | | Raanta | PNC Arena | 18,749 | 25–15–5 | 55 | |
| 46 | January 24 | @ Boston | 3–2 | | Martin | TD Garden | 17,850 | 26–15–5 | 57 | |
| 47 | January 25 | New Jersey | 3–2 | | Raanta | PNC Arena | 18,792 | 27–15–5 | 59 | |
| 48 | January 27 | Arizona | 3–1 | | Raanta | PNC Arena | 18,718 | 28–15–5 | 61 | |

February: 8–3–1 (home: 4–2–0; road: 4–1–1)

| Game | Date | Opponent | Score | OT | Decision | Location | Attendance | Record | Points | Recap |
|---|---|---|---|---|---|---|---|---|---|---|
| 49 | February 6 | Vancouver | 2–3 | | Kochetkov | PNC Arena | 18,700 | 28–16–5 | 61 | |
| 50 | February 8 | Colorado | 5–2 | | Kochetkov | PNC Arena | 18,720 | 29–16–5 | 63 | |
| 51 | February 10 | New Jersey | 1–0 | OT | Kochetkov | PNC Arena | 18,997 | 30–16–5 | 65 | |
| 52 | February 13 | @ Dallas | 2–4 | | Kochetkov | American Airlines Center | 18,532 | 30–17–5 | 65 | |
| 53 | February 16 | @ Arizona | 5–1 | | Kochetkov | Mullett Arena | 4,600 | 31–17–5 | 67 | |
| 54 | February 17 | @ Vegas | 3–1 | | Martin | T-Mobile Arena | 18,355 | 32–17–5 | 69 | |
| 55 | February 19 | Chicago | 6–3 | | Martin | PNC Arena | 18,909 | 33–17–5 | 71 | |
| 56 | February 22 | Florida | 1–0 | | Kochetkov | PNC Arena | 18,700 | 34–17–5 | 73 | |
| 57 | February 24 | Dallas | 1–2 | | Kochetkov | PNC Arena | 18,952 | 34–18–5 | 73 | |
| 58 | February 25 | @ Buffalo | 2–3 | SO | Martin | KeyBank Center | 15,690 | 34–18–6 | 74 | |
| 59 | February 27 | @ Minnesota | 3–2 | | Kochetkov | Xcel Energy Center | 18,775 | 35–18–6 | 76 | |
| 60 | February 29 | @ Columbus | 4–2 | | Martin | Nationwide Arena | 18,390 | 36–18–6 | 78 | |

March: 11–3–1 (home: 6–2–0; road: 5–1–1)

| Game | Date | Opponent | Score | OT | Decision | Location | Attendance | Record | Points | Recap |
|---|---|---|---|---|---|---|---|---|---|---|
| 61 | March 2 | Winnipeg | 3–5 | | Kochetkov | PNC Arena | 18,876 | 36–19–6 | 78 | |
| 62 | March 7 | Montreal | 4–1 | | Andersen | PNC Arena | 18,859 | 37–19–6 | 80 | |
| 63 | March 9 | @ New Jersey | 4–2 | | Kochetkov | Prudential Center | 16,514 | 38–19–6 | 82 | |
| 64 | March 10 | Calgary | 7–2 | | Andersen | PNC Arena | 18,728 | 39–19–6 | 84 | |
| 65 | March 12 | NY Rangers | 0–1 | | Kochetkov | PNC Arena | 18,859 | 39–20–6 | 84 | |
| 66 | March 14 | Florida | 4–0 | | Andersen | PNC Arena | 18,700 | 40–20–6 | 86 | |
| 67 | March 16 | @ Toronto | 5–4 | SO | Kochetkov | Scotiabank Arena | 19,103 | 41–20–6 | 88 | |
| 68 | March 17 | @ Ottawa | 7–2 | | Andersen | Canadian Tire Centre | 16,273 | 42–20–6 | 90 | |
| 69 | March 19 | @ NY Islanders | 4–1 | | Kochetkov | UBS Arena | 18,700 | 43–20–6 | 92 | |
| 70 | March 21 | Philadelphia | 3–2 | OT | Andersen | PNC Arena | 18,700 | 44–20–6 | 94 | |
| 71 | March 22 | @ Washington | 6–7 | SO | Kochetkov | Capital One Arena | 18,573 | 44–20–7 | 95 | |
| 72 | March 24 | Toronto | 2–1 | | Andersen | PNC Arena | 18,723 | 45–20–7 | 97 | |
| 73 | March 26 | @ Pittsburgh | 1–4 | | Kochetkov | PPG Paints Arena | 17,913 | 45–21–7 | 97 | |
| 74 | March 28 | Detroit | 4–0 | | Andersen | PNC Arena | 18,906 | 46–21–7 | 99 | |
| 75 | March 30 | @ Montreal | 3–0 | | Kochetkov | Bell Centre | 21,105 | 47–21–7 | 101 | |

April: 5–2–0 (home: 2–1–0; road: 3–1–0)

| Game | Date | Opponent | Score | OT | Decision | Location | Attendance | Record | Points | Recap |
|---|---|---|---|---|---|---|---|---|---|---|
| 76 | April 4 | Boston | 1–4 | | Andersen | PNC Arena | 18,853 | 47–22–7 | 101 | |
| 77 | April 5 | Washington | 4–2 | | Kochetkov | PNC Arena | 18,724 | 48–22–7 | 103 | |
| 78 | April 7 | Columbus | 3–0 | | Andersen | PNC Arena | 18,837 | 49–22–7 | 105 | |
| 79 | April 9 | @ Boston | 4–1 | | Kochetkov | TD Garden | 17,850 | 50–22–7 | 107 | |
| 80 | April 12 | @ St. Louis | 5–2 | | Andersen | Enterprise Center | 18,096 | 51–22–7 | 109 | |
| 81 | April 14 | @ Chicago | 4–2 | | Kochetkov | United Center | 18,742 | 52–22–7 | 111 | |
| 82 | April 16 | @ Columbus | 3–6 | | Martin | Nationwide Arena | 17,289 | 52–23–7 | 111 | |

Win (2 points) Loss (0 points) Overtime/shootout loss (1 point)

=== Playoffs ===
2024 Stanley Cup playoffs
Eastern Conference first round vs. (M3) New York Islanders: Carolina won 4–1

| Game | Date | Opponent | Score | OT | Decision | Attendance | Series | Recap |
|---|---|---|---|---|---|---|---|---|
| 1 | April 20 | NY Islanders | 3–1 | | Andersen | 18,825 | 1–0 | |
| 2 | April 22 | NY Islanders | 5–3 | | Andersen | 18,905 | 2–0 | |
| 3 | April 25 | @ NY Islanders | 3–2 | | Andersen | 17,255 | 3–0 | |
| 4 | April 27 | @ NY Islanders | 2–3 | 2OT | Andersen | 17,255 | 3–1 | |
| 5 | April 30 | NY Islanders | 6–3 | | Andersen | 18,874 | 4–1 | |

Eastern Conference second round vs. (M1) New York Rangers: New York won 4–2

| Game | Date | Opponent | Score | OT | Decision | Attendance | Series | Recap |
|---|---|---|---|---|---|---|---|---|
| 1 | May 5 | @ NY Rangers | 3–4 | | Andersen | 18,006 | 0–1 | |
| 2 | May 7 | @ NY Rangers | 3–4 | 2OT | Andersen | 18,006 | 0–2 | |
| 3 | May 9 | NY Rangers | 2–3 | OT | Kochetkov | 18,959 | 0–3 | |
| 4 | May 11 | NY Rangers | 4–3 | | Andersen | 19,074 | 1–3 | |
| 5 | May 13 | @ NY Rangers | 4–1 | | Andersen | 18,006 | 2–3 | |
| 6 | May 16 | NY Rangers | 3–5 | | Andersen | 19,124 | 2–4 | |

Legend: Win Loss

== Player statistics ==
Final

=== Skaters ===
Regular season
| Player | GP | G | A | Pts | +/− | PIM |
|---|---|---|---|---|---|---|
| Sebastian Aho | 78 | 36 | 53 | 89 | +34 | 36 |
| Seth Jarvis | 81 | 33 | 34 | 67 | +23 | 14 |
| Teuvo Teravainen | 76 | 25 | 28 | 53 | +15 | 10 |
| Martin Necas | 77 | 24 | 29 | 53 | −9 | 42 |
| Andrei Svechnikov | 59 | 19 | 33 | 52 | +13 | 58 |
| Brady Skjei | 80 | 13 | 34 | 47 | +15 | 40 |
| Brent Burns | 82 | 10 | 33 | 43 | +19 | 20 |
| Stefan Noesen | 81 | 14 | 23 | 37 | +13 | 33 |
| Jaccob Slavin | 81 | 6 | 31 | 37 | +21 | 8 |
| Michael Bunting^{‡} | 60 | 13 | 23 | 36 | −15 | 55 |
| Jordan Martinook | 82 | 14 | 18 | 32 | −1 | 36 |
| Jordan Staal | 80 | 10 | 20 | 30 | −14 | 44 |
| Jesperi Kotkaniemi | 79 | 12 | 15 | 27 | −4 | 36 |
| Jack Drury | 74 | 8 | 19 | 27 | +4 | 33 |
| Dmitry Orlov | 82 | 6 | 20 | 26 | +4 | 36 |
| Jake Guentzel^{†} | 17 | 8 | 17 | 25 | +16 | 8 |
| Jalen Chatfield | 72 | 8 | 14 | 22 | +15 | 24 |
| Jesper Fast | 73 | 6 | 13 | 19 | 0 | 16 |
| Brett Pesce | 70 | 3 | 10 | 13 | +10 | 20 |
| Tony DeAngelo | 31 | 3 | 8 | 11 | −7 | 24 |
| Evgeny Kuznetsov^{†} | 20 | 2 | 5 | 7 | 0 | 6 |
| Brendan Lemieux | 32 | 3 | 2 | 5 | 0 | 64 |
| Vasily Ponomarev^{‡} | 2 | 1 | 1 | 2 | +1 | 0 |
| Max Comtois | 1 | 0 | 1 | 1 | 0 | 0 |
| Callahan Burke | 1 | 0 | 0 | 0 | 0 | 0 |
| Jackson Blake | 1 | 0 | 0 | 0 | −2 | 0 |
| Dylan Coghlan | 1 | 0 | 0 | 0 | −2 | 0 |
| Bradly Nadeau | 1 | 0 | 0 | 0 | −3 | 0 |
| Scott Morrow | 2 | 0 | 0 | 0 | −3 | 0 |

Playoffs
| Player | GP | G | A | Pts | +/− | PIM |
|---|---|---|---|---|---|---|
| Sebastian Aho | 11 | 4 | 8 | 12 | +1 | 2 |
| Andrei Svechnikov | 11 | 2 | 9 | 11 | 0 | 16 |
| Seth Jarvis | 11 | 5 | 4 | 9 | +2 | 0 |
| Martin Necas | 11 | 4 | 5 | 9 | 0 | 0 |
| Jake Guentzel | 11 | 4 | 5 | 9 | +4 | 16 |
| Brady Skjei | 11 | 1 | 8 | 9 | +5 | 6 |
| Evgeny Kuznetsov | 10 | 4 | 2 | 6 | +1 | 4 |
| Teuvo Teravainen | 11 | 2 | 4 | 6 | 0 | 0 |
| Dmitry Orlov | 11 | 2 | 4 | 6 | 0 | 14 |
| Jack Drury | 11 | 1 | 4 | 5 | +7 | 2 |
| Jordan Martinook | 11 | 2 | 2 | 4 | +3 | 6 |
| Stefan Noesen | 11 | 4 | 0 | 4 | +1 | 21 |
| Brent Burns | 11 | 1 | 3 | 4 | +4 | 2 |
| Jaccob Slavin | 11 | 1 | 2 | 3 | +5 | 2 |
| Tony DeAngelo | 9 | 0 | 2 | 2 | −1 | 6 |
| Jalen Chatfield | 11 | 0 | 2 | 2 | –1 | 12 |
| Jordan Staal | 11 | 1 | 1 | 2 | +4 | 4 |
| Brett Pesce | 2 | 0 | 1 | 1 | +1 | 2 |
| Jesperi Kotkaniemi | 11 | 0 | 1 | 1 | −2 | 4 |
| Max Comtois | 1 | 0 | 0 | 0 | −1 | 0 |

=== Goaltenders ===
Regular season
| Player | GP | GS | TOI | W | L | OT | GA | GAA | SA | SV% | SO | G | A | PIM |
|---|---|---|---|---|---|---|---|---|---|---|---|---|---|---|
| Pyotr Kochetkov | 42 | 40 | 2,371:29 | 23 | 13 | 4 | 92 | 2.33 | 1,031 | .911 | 4 | 0 | 0 | 8 |
| Frederik Andersen | 16 | 16 | 912:53 | 13 | 2 | 0 | 28 | 1.84 | 410 | .932 | 3 | 0 | 1 | 0 |
| Antti Raanta | 24 | 20 | 1,265:11 | 12 | 7 | 2 | 63 | 2.99 | 493 | .872 | 1 | 0 | 0 | 0 |
| Spencer Martin^{†} | 6 | 6 | 365:00 | 4 | 1 | 1 | 16 | 2.63 | 154 | .896 | 0 | 0 | 0 | 0 |
| Yaniv Perets | 1 | 0 | 12:46 | 0 | 0 | 0 | 0 | 0.00 | 1 | 1.000 | 0 | 0 | 0 | 0 |

Playoffs
| Player | GP | GS | TOI | W | L | GA | GAA | SA | SV% | SO | G | A | PIM |
|---|---|---|---|---|---|---|---|---|---|---|---|---|---|
| Frederik Andersen | 10 | 10 | 641:54 | 6 | 4 | 28 | 2.62 | 267 | .895 | 0 | 0 | 0 | 0 |
| Pyotr Kochetkov | 1 | 1 | 60:54 | 0 | 1 | 3 | 2.96 | 25 | .880 | 0 | 0 | 0 | 0 |

^{†}Denotes player spent time with another team before joining the Hurricanes. Stats reflect time with the Hurricanes only.

^{‡}Denotes player was traded mid-season. Stats reflect time with the Hurricanes only.

Bold/italics denotes franchise record.

== Transactions ==
The Hurricanes have been involved in the following transactions during the 2023–24 season.

Key:

† Contract is entry-level.
‡ Contract initially takes effect in the 2024–25 NHL season.

=== Trades ===
| Date | Details | | Ref |
|---|---|---|---|
| June 29, 2023 | To San Jose Sharks 3rd-round pick in 2025 | To Carolina Hurricanes 3rd-round pick in 2023; 4th-round pick in 2023 | |
| August 9, 2023 | To Philadelphia Flyers Massimo Rizzo; 5th-round pick in 2025 | To Carolina Hurricanes David Kase | |
| October 10, 2023 | To Colorado Avalanche Caleb Jones | To Carolina Hurricanes Callahan Burke | |
| February 29, 2024 | To Anaheim Ducks Kirill Slepets | To Carolina Hurricanes Ilya Lyubushkin* | |
| February 29, 2024 | To Toronto Maple Leafs Ilya Lyubushkin* | To Carolina Hurricanes 6th-round pick in 2024 | |
| March 7, 2024 | To Pittsburgh Penguins Michael Bunting; Ville Koivunen; Cruz Lucius; Vasili Ponomaryov; Conditional 1st-round or 2nd-round pick in 2024^{1} Conditional 5th-round pick in 2024^{2} | To Carolina Hurricanes Jake Guentzel*; Ty Smith | |
| March 7, 2024 | To Toronto Maple Leafs Cade Webber | To Carolina Hurricanes 6th-round pick in 2026 | |
| March 8, 2024 | To Washington Capitals 3rd-round pick in 2025 | To Carolina Hurricanes Evgeny Kuznetsov* | |

Notes:

- Anaheim and Carolina each retain 50% of Lyubushkin's remaining contract.
- Pittsburgh retains 25% of Guentzel's remaining contract.
- Carolina will send a 1st-round pick if they advance to the Stanley Cup Finals otherwise it will become a 2nd-round pick.
- Carolina will send a 5th-round pick if the Hurricanes win the Stanley Cup.
- Washington retains 50% of Kuznetsov's remaining contract.

=== Players acquired ===
| Date | Player | Former team | Term | Via | Ref |
|---|---|---|---|---|---|
| July 1, 2023 | Michael Bunting | Toronto Maple Leafs | 3-year | Free agency | |
| July 1, 2023 | Dmitry Orlov | Boston Bruins | 2-year | Free agency | |
| July 3, 2023 | Griffin Mendel | Chicago Wolves (AHL) | 1-year† | Free agency | |
| July 11, 2023 | Brendan Lemieux | Philadelphia Flyers | 1-year | Free agency | |
| July 24, 2023 | Tony DeAngelo | Philadelphia Flyers | 1-year | Free agency | |
| August 10, 2023 | Caleb Jones | Chicago Blackhawks | 1-year | Free agency | |
| January 19, 2024 | Spencer Martin | Columbus Blue Jackets | | Waivers | |

=== Players lost ===
| Date | Player | New team | Term | Via | Ref |
|---|---|---|---|---|---|
| July 1, 2023 | William Lagesson | Toronto Maple Leafs | 1-year | Free agency | |
| July 1, 2023 | Maxime Lajoie | Toronto Maple Leafs | 1-year | Free agency | |
| July 1, 2023 | Mackenzie MacEachern | St. Louis Blues | 2-year | Free agency | |
| July 1, 2023 | Max Pacioretty | Washington Capitals | 1-year | Free agency | |
| July 1, 2023 | Zach Sawchenko | Vancouver Canucks | 1-year | Free agency | |
| July 2, 2023 | Calvin de Haan | Tampa Bay Lightning | 1-year | Free agency | |
| July 2, 2023 | Shayne Gostisbehere | Detroit Red Wings | 1-year | Free agency | |
| July 16, 2023 | Ondrej Kase | HC Litvínov (ELH) | 1-year | Free agency | |
| August 2, 2023 | Cavan Fitzgerald | Chicago Wolves (AHL) | 1-year | Free agency | |
| August 10, 2023 | Malte Stromwall | Frölunda HC (SHL) | 1-year | Free agency | |
| October 3, 2023 | Jack Dugan | Fort Wayne Komets (ECHL) | 1-year | Free agency | |
| October 3, 2023 | Derek Stepan | | | Retired | |

=== Signings ===
| Date | Player | Term | Ref |
|---|---|---|---|
| July 1, 2023 | Frederik Andersen | 2-year | |
| July 1, 2023 | Jesper Fast | 2-year | |
| July 1, 2023 | Antti Raanta | 1-year | |
| July 5, 2023 | Dylan Coghlan | 1-year | |
| July 15, 2023 | Felix Unger Sorum | 3-year† | |
| July 26, 2023 | Sebastian Aho | 8-year‡ | |
| May 29, 2024 | Ryan Suzuki | 1-year | |
| June 14, 2024 | Jalen Chatfield | 3-year | |
| June 21, 2024 | Ty Smith | 1-year | |

== Draft picks ==
Below are the Carolina Hurricanes selections at the 2023 NHL entry draft, which was held on June 28 and 29, 2023, at Bridgestone Arena in Nashville, Tennessee.

| Round | # | Player | Pos | Nationality | College/Junior/Club team (League) |
|---|---|---|---|---|---|
| 1 | 30 | Bradly Nadeau | LW | Canada | Penticton Vees (BCHL) |
| 2 | 62 | Felix Unger Sörum | RW | Sweden | Leksands IF (J20 Nationell) |
| 3 | 71 | Jayden Perron | RW | Canada | Chicago Steel (USHL) |
| 4 | 100 | Alexander Rykov | RW | Russia | Chelmet Chelyabinsk (VHL) |
| 4 | 126 | Stanislav Yarovoi | RW | Russia | HC Vityaz (KHL) |
| 5 | 139 | Charles-Alexis Legault | D | Canada | Quinnipiac Bobcats (ECAC) |
| 5 | 158 | Ruslan Khazheyev | G | Russia | Belye Medvedi (MHL) |
| 6 | 163 | Timur Mukhanov | LW | Russia | Severstal Cherepovets (KHL) |
| 6 | 190 | Michael Emerson | RW | United States | North Dakota Fighting Hawks (NCHC) |
| 7 | 222 | Yegor Velmakin | G | Russia | Buran Voronezh (VHL) |
