= 2023–24 New York Islanders season =

National Hockey League season

2023–24 New York Islanders
- Division: 3rd Metropolitan
- Conference: 7th Eastern
- 2023–24 record: 39–27–16
- Home record: 21–10–10
- Road record: 18–17–6
- Goals for: 246
- Goals against: 263

Team information
- General manager: Lou Lamoriello
- Coach: Lane Lambert (Oct. 14 – Jan. 20); Patrick Roy (Jan. 20 – Apr. 30)
- Captain: Anders Lee
- Alternate captains: Cal Clutterbuck; Brock Nelson
- Arena: UBS Arena
- Average attendance: 16,540
- Minor league affiliates: Bridgeport Islanders (AHL); Worcester Railers (ECHL)

Team leaders
- Goals: Brock Nelson (34)
- Assists: Noah Dobson (60)
- Points: Mathew Barzal (80)
- Penalty minutes: Anders Lee (68)
- Plus/minus: Alexander Romanov (+23)
- Wins: Ilya Sorokin (25)
- Goals against average: Semyon Varlamov (2.60)

The 2023–24 New York Islanders season was the 52nd season in the franchise's history. It was their third season in UBS Arena.

On January 20, 2024, the Islanders, who had a 19–15–11 record and were out of playoff contention, fired head coach Lane Lambert, and replaced him with Patrick Roy.

The Islanders participated in the 2024 NHL Stadium Series at MetLife Stadium in East Rutherford, New Jersey, where they hosted the New York Rangers on February 18, losing the game 6–5 in overtime.

On April 15, the Islanders clinched a playoff berth following a 4–1 win over the New Jersey Devils. The Islanders played against the Carolina Hurricanes in the first round for the second consecutive season and once again lost, this time in five games.

== Standings ==
=== Divisional standings ===
Metropolitan Division
Pos	Team	GP	W	L	OTL	RW	GF	GA	GD	Pts
1	p – New York Rangers	82	55	23	4	43	282	229	+53	114
2	x – Carolina Hurricanes	82	52	23	7	44	279	216	+63	111
3	x – New York Islanders	82	39	27	16	29	246	263	−17	94
4	x – Washington Capitals	82	40	31	11	32	220	257	−37	91
5	Pittsburgh Penguins	82	38	32	12	32	255	251	+4	88
6	Philadelphia Flyers	82	38	33	11	30	235	261	−26	87
7	New Jersey Devils	82	38	39	5	33	264	283	−19	81
8	Columbus Blue Jackets	82	27	43	12	21	237	300	−63	66

Source: National Hockey League
Rules for classification: 1) Fewer number of games played (GP, only during regular season); 2) Greater number of regulation wins (RW); 3) Greater number of wins in regulation and overtime, excluding shootout wins (ROW); 4) Greater number of total wins, including shootouts (W); 5) Greater number of points earned in head-to-head play; if teams played an uneven number of head-to-head games, the result of the first game on the home ice of the team with the extra home game is discarded; 6) Greater goal differential (GD); 7) Greater number of goals scored (GF)
p – Clinched Presidents' Trophy; x – Clinched playoff spot

=== Conference standings ===
Eastern Conference Wild Card
Pos	Div	Team	GP	W	L	OTL	RW	GF	GA	GD	Pts
1	AT	x – Tampa Bay Lightning	82	45	29	8	37	291	268	+23	98
2	ME	x – Washington Capitals	82	40	31	11	32	220	257	−37	91
3	AT	Detroit Red Wings	82	41	32	9	27	278	274	+4	91
4	ME	Pittsburgh Penguins	82	38	32	12	32	255	251	+4	88
5	ME	Philadelphia Flyers	82	38	33	11	30	235	261	−26	87
6	AT	Buffalo Sabres	82	39	37	6	33	246	244	+2	84
7	ME	New Jersey Devils	82	38	39	5	33	264	283	−19	81
8	AT	Ottawa Senators	82	37	41	4	25	255	281	−26	78
9	AT	Montreal Canadiens	82	30	36	16	20	236	289	−53	76
10	ME	Columbus Blue Jackets	82	27	43	12	21	237	300	−63	66

Source: National Hockey League
Rules for classification: 1) Fewer number of games played (GP, only during regular season); 2) Greater number of regulation wins (RW); 3) Greater number of wins in regulation and overtime, excluding shootout wins (ROW); 4) Greater number of total wins, including shootouts (W); 5) Greater number of points earned in head-to-head play; if teams played an uneven number of head-to-head games, the result of the first game on the home ice of the team with the extra home game is discarded; 6) Greater goal differential (GD); 7) Greater number of goals scored (GF)
x – Clinched playoff spot

== Schedule and results ==
=== Preseason ===
The preseason schedule was published on June 22, 2023.

2023 preseason game log: 2–4–0 (home: 2–1–0; road: 0–3–0)
#	Date	Visitor	Score	Home	OT	Decision	Attendance	Record	Recap
1	September 26	NY Islanders	2–4	NY Rangers		Varlamov	16,643	0–1–0
2	September 27	Philadelphia	1–2	NY Islanders		Appleby	9,106	1–1–0
—	September 29	NY Rangers	–	NY Islanders	Postponed due to flooding in the New York metropolitan area; moved to September 30
3	September 30	NY Rangers	3–5	NY Islanders		Varlamov	12,940	2–1–0
4	October 2	NY Islanders	5–6	New Jersey		Appleby	8,811	2–2–0
5	October 5	NY Islanders	2–5	Philadelphia		Varlamov	11,289	2–3–0
6	October 6	New Jersey	3–0	NY Islanders		Sorokin	10,978	2–4–0

=== Regular season ===
The regular season schedule was published on June 27, 2023.

2023–24 game log

October: 4–2–2 (home: 3–1–2; road: 1–1–0)
#	Date	Visitor	Score	Home	OT	Decision	Attendance	Record	Pts	Recap
1	October 14	Buffalo	2–3	NY Islanders		Sorokin	17,255	1–0–0	2
2	October 17	Arizona	0–1	NY Islanders		Sorokin	14,456	2–0–0	4
3	October 20	New Jersey	5–4	NY Islanders	OT	Sorokin	17,255	2–0–1	5
4	October 21	NY Islanders	1–3	Buffalo		Varlamov	16,179	2–1–1	5
5	October 24	Colorado	7–4	NY Islanders		Sorokin	14,856	2–2–1	5
6	October 26	Ottawa	2–3	NY Islanders		Sorokin	14,911	3–2–1	7
7	October 28	NY Islanders	2–0	Columbus		Varlamov	15,424	4–2–1	9
8	October 30	Detroit	4–3	NY Islanders	OT	Sorokin	15,407	4–2–2	10

November: 5–5–4 (home: 1–2–2; road: 4–3–2)
#	Date	Visitor	Score	Home	OT	Decision	Attendance	Record	Pts	Recap
9	November 2	NY Islanders	3–0	Washington		Varlamov	16,209	5–2–2	12
10	November 4	Carolina	4–3	NY Islanders	OT	Sorokin	17,255	5–2–3	13
11	November 7	Minnesota	4–2	NY Islanders		Varlamov	13,527	5–3–3	13
12	November 9	NY Islanders	2–5	Boston		Sorokin	17,850	5–4–3	13
13	November 11	Washington	4–1	NY Islanders		Varlamov	16,519	5–5–3	13
14	November 13	NY Islanders	1–4	Edmonton		Sorokin	17,881	5–6–3	13
15	November 15	NY Islanders	3–4	Vancouver	OT	Sorokin	18,972	5–6–4	14
16	November 16	NY Islanders	3–4	Seattle	SO	Varlamov	17,151	5–6–5	15
17	November 18	NY Islanders	5–4	Calgary	SO	Sorokin	17,167	6–6–5	17
18	November 22	Philadelphia	2–3	NY Islanders		Sorokin	17,255	7–6–5	19
19	November 24	NY Islanders	5–3	Ottawa		Varlamov	17,693	8–6–5	21
20	November 25	Philadelphia	1–0	NY Islanders	SO	Sorokin	17,255	8–6–6	22
21	November 28	NY Islanders	4–5	New Jersey		Sorokin	16,091	8–7–6	22
22	November 30	NY Islanders	5–4	Carolina	OT	Varlamov	18,700	9–7–6	24

December: 8–3–3 (home: 6–1–2; road: 2–2–1)
#	Date	Visitor	Score	Home	OT	Decision	Attendance	Record	Pts	Recap
23	December 2	NY Islanders	4–3	Florida		Sorokin	18,721	10–7–6	26
24	December 5	San Jose	5–4	NY Islanders	OT	Sorokin	14,244	10–7–7	27
25	December 7	Columbus	3–7	NY Islanders		Varlamov	13,510	11–7–7	29
26	December 9	Los Angeles	2–3	NY Islanders	OT	Sorokin	17,255	12–7–7	31
27	December 11	Toronto	3–4	NY Islanders	OT	Sorokin	17,255	13–7–7	33
28	December 13	Anaheim	3–4	NY Islanders		Varlamov	14,207	14–7–7	35
29	December 15	Boston	5–4	NY Islanders	SO	Sorokin	17,255	14–7–8	36
30	December 16	NY Islanders	3–5	Montreal		Varlamov	21,105	14–8–8	36
31	December 19	Edmonton	1–3	NY Islanders		Sorokin	16,523	15–8–8	38
32	December 20	NY Islanders	2–3	Washington	OT	Varlamov	18,573	15–8–9	39
33	December 23	NY Islanders	5–4	Carolina		Sorokin	18,921	16–8–9	41
34	December 27	Pittsburgh	7–0	NY Islanders		Sorokin	17,255	16–9–9	41
35	December 29	Washington	1–5	NY Islanders		Sorokin	17,255	17–9–9	43
36	December 31	NY Islanders	1–3	Pittsburgh		Sorokin	18,216	17–10–9	43

January: 3–7–3 (home: 2–2–1; road: 1–5–2)
#	Date	Visitor	Score	Home	OT	Decision	Attendance	Record	Pts	Recap
37	January 2	NY Islanders	4–5	Colorado	OT	Sorokin	18,121	17–10–10	44
38	January 4	NY Islanders	5–1	Arizona		Sorokin	4,600	18–10–10	46
39	January 6	NY Islanders	2–5	Vegas		Sorokin	18,312	18–11–10	46
40	January 9	Vancouver	5–2	NY Islanders		Sorokin	15,690	18–12–10	46
41	January 11	Toronto	3–4	NY Islanders	OT	Sorokin	17,255	19–12–10	48
42	January 13	NY Islanders	1–3	Nashville		Sorokin	17,474	19–13–10	48
43	January 15	NY Islanders	0–5	Minnesota		Sorokin	18,231	19–14–10	48
44	January 16	NY Islanders	2–4	Winnipeg		Sorokin	12,600	19–15–10	48
45	January 19	NY Islanders	3–4	Chicago	OT	Sorokin	18,463	19–15–11	49
46	January 21	Dallas	2–3	NY Islanders	OT	Sorokin	17,255	20–15–11	51
47	January 23	Vegas	3–2	NY Islanders		Sorokin	16,077	20–16–11	51
48	January 25	NY Islanders	3–4	Montreal		Varlamov	21,105	20–17–11	51
49	January 27	Florida	3–2	NY Islanders	OT	Varlamov	17,255	20–17–12	52

February: 5–3–2 (home: 1–2–2; road: 4–1–0)
#	Date	Visitor	Score	Home	OT	Decision	Attendance	Record	Pts	Recap
50	February 5	NY Islanders	3–2	Toronto		Sorokin	18,365	21–17–12	54
51	February 8	Tampa Bay	2–6	NY Islanders		Sorokin	17,255	22–17–12	56
52	February 10	Calgary	5–2	NY Islanders		Varlamov	17,255	22–18–12	56
53	February 13	Seattle	2–1	NY Islanders	SO	Sorokin	17,255	22–18–13	57
54	February 18	NY Rangers	6–5	NY Islanders	OT	Sorokin	79,690 (outdoors)	22–18–14	58
55	February 20	NY Islanders	5–4	Pittsburgh	OT	Sorokin	18,016	23–18–14	60
56	February 22	NY Islanders	0–4	St. Louis		Varlamov	18,096	23–19–14	60
57	February 24	Tampa Bay	4–2	NY Islanders		Sorokin	17,255	23–20–14	60
58	February 26	NY Islanders	3–2	Dallas	OT	Varlamov	18,532	24–20–14	62
59	February 29	NY Islanders	5–3	Detroit		Sorokin	19,515	25–20–14	64

March: 6–7–1 (home: 3–2–1; road: 3–5–0)
#	Date	Visitor	Score	Home	OT	Decision	Attendance	Record	Pts	Recap
60	March 2	Boston	1–5	NY Islanders		Sorokin	17,255	26–20–14	66
61	March 5	St. Louis	2–4	NY Islanders		Sorokin	16,540	27–20–14	68
62	March 7	NY Islanders	7–2	San Jose		Sorokin	10,077	28–20–14	70
63	March 10	NY Islanders	6–1	Anaheim		Varlamov	15,631	29–20–14	72
64	March 11	NY Islanders	0–3	Los Angeles		Sorokin	17,061	29–21–14	72
65	March 14	NY Islanders	0–4	Buffalo		Sorokin	15,637	29–22–14	72
66	March 16	Ottawa	4–3	NY Islanders	OT	Varlamov	17,255	29–22–15	73
67	March 17	NY Islanders	2–5	NY Rangers		Sorokin	18,006	29–23–15	73
68	March 19	Carolina	4–1	NY Islanders		Sorokin	17,255	29–24–15	73
69	March 21	NY Islanders	3–6	Detroit		Sorokin	18,868	29–25–15	73
70	March 23	Winnipeg	3–6	NY Islanders		Varlamov	17,255	30–25–15	75
71	March 24	New Jersey	4–0	NY Islanders		Sorokin	17,255	30–26–15	75
72	March 28	NY Islanders	3–2	Florida		Varlamov	19,201	31–26–15	77
73	March 30	NY Islanders	1–4	Tampa Bay		Varlamov	19,092	31–27–15	77

April: 8–0–1 (home: 5–0–0; road: 3–0–1)
#	Date	Visitor	Score	Home	OT	Decision	Attendance	Record	Pts	Recap
74	April 1	NY Islanders	4–3	Philadelphia	OT	Varlamov	18,556	32–27–15	79
75	April 2	Chicago	1–2	NY Islanders		Sorokin	17,255	33–27–15	81
76	April 4	NY Islanders	4–2	Columbus		Sorokin	16,213	34–27–15	83
77	April 6	Nashville	0–2	NY Islanders		Varlamov	17,255	35–27–15	85
78	April 9	NY Rangers	2–4	NY Islanders		Varlamov	17,255	36–27–15	87
79	April 11	Montreal	2–3	NY Islanders	OT	Varlamov	17,255	37–27–15	89
80	April 13	NY Islanders	2–3	NY Rangers	SO	Sorokin	18,006	37–27–16	90
81	April 15	NY Islanders	4–1	New Jersey		Varlamov	16,514	38–27–16	92
82	April 17	Pittsburgh	4–5	NY Islanders		Sorokin	17,255	39–27–16	94

Legend: Win (2 points) Loss (0 points) Overtime/shootout loss (1 point)

=== Playoffs ===
The Islanders faced the Carolina Hurricanes in the first round, losing the series in five games.

2024 Stanley Cup playoffs

Eastern Conference first round vs. (M2) Carolina Hurricanes: Carolina won 4–1
#	Date	Visitor	Score	Home	OT	Decision	Attendance	Series	Recap
1	April 20	NY Islanders	1–3	Carolina		Varlamov	18,825	0–1
2	April 22	NY Islanders	3–5	Carolina		Varlamov	18,905	0–2
3	April 25	Carolina	3–2	NY Islanders		Sorokin	17,255	0–3
4	April 27	Carolina	2–3	NY Islanders	2OT	Varlamov	17,255	1–3
5	April 30	NY Islanders	3–6	Carolina		Varlamov	18,874	1–4

Legend: Win Loss

== Player statistics ==
As of April 30, 2024

=== Skaters ===
Regular season
Player	GP	G	A	Pts	+/−	PIM
Mathew Barzal	80	23	57	80	–4	34
Noah Dobson	79	10	60	70	+12	36
Brock Nelson	82	34	35	69	–5	28
Bo Horvat	81	33	35	68	–1	39
Kyle Palmieri	82	30	24	54	–16	26
Anders Lee	81	20	17	37	+2	68
Jean-Gabriel Pageau	82	11	22	33	–8	13
Pierre Engvall	74	10	18	28	+4	18
Simon Holmström	75	15	10	25	+2	14
Mike Reilly^{†}	59	6	18	24	+1	28
Casey Cizikas	70	10	13	23	–2	22
Alexander Romanov	81	7	15	22	+23	20
Cal Clutterbuck	82	7	12	19	+4	32
Ryan Pulock	58	5	14	19	+3	12
Adam Pelech	58	1	15	16	–2	27
Hudson Fasching	45	4	10	14	–7	6
Julien Gauthier	27	5	4	9	–5	8
Kyle MacLean	32	4	5	9	+5	11
Sebastian Aho	58	2	7	9	–7	12
Matt Martin	57	4	4	8	+7	43
Oliver Wahlstrom	32	2	4	6	–6	8
Samuel Bolduc	34	2	3	5	–4	6
Scott Mayfield	41	0	5	5	–7	35
Ruslan Iskhakov	1	0	1	1	0	0
Grant Hutton	2	0	0	0	+1	0
Robert Bortuzzo^{†}	23	0	0	0	–2	20

Playoffs
Player	GP	G	A	Pts	+/−	PIM
Mathew Barzal	5	2	3	5	–1	4
Brock Nelson	5	2	2	4	–2	10
Anders Lee	5	1	3	4	–4	6
Bo Horvat	5	1	2	3	–2	0
Kyle Palmieri	5	1	2	3	–1	12
Ryan Pulock	5	0	3	3	+1	0
Pierre Engvall	5	1	1	2	–1	0
Mike Reilly	5	1	1	2	–3	0
Jean-Gabriel Pageau	5	1	1	2	–3	0
Casey Cizikas	5	1	1	2	–1	14
Adam Pelech	5	0	2	2	–1	4
Kyle MacLean	5	1	0	1	–1	5
Alexander Romanov	5	0	1	1	+2	0
Noah Dobson	5	0	1	1	–1	6
Robert Bortuzzo	5	0	1	1	–3	14
Simon Holmström	3	0	0	0	+1	0
Ruslan Iskhakov	1	0	0	0	0	0
Hudson Fasching	4	0	0	0	0	2
Matt Martin	3	0	0	0	–1	16
Cal Clutterbuck	5	0	0	0	–3	10

=== Goaltenders ===
Regular season
Player	GP	GS	TOI	W	L	OT	GA	GAA	SA	SV%	SO	G	A	PIM
Ilya Sorokin	56	55	3,325:59	25	19	12	167	3.01	1,821	.909	2	0	2	0
Semyon Varlamov	28	27	1,594:44	14	8	4	69	2.60	837	.918	3	0	0	0
Ken Appleby	1	0	20:00	0	0	0	2	6.00	8	.750	0	0	0	0

Playoffs
Player	GP	GS	TOI	W	L	GA	GAA	SA	SV%	SO	G	A	PIM
Semyon Varlamov	5	4	289:09	1	3	13	2.70	152	.914	0	0	0	2
Ilya Sorokin	1	1	27:14	0	1	3	6.61	14	.786	0	0	0	0

- ^{†} Denotes player spent time with another team before joining the Islanders. Stats reflect time with the Islanders only.
- ^{‡} Denotes player was traded mid-season. Stats reflect time with the Islanders only.
- Bold/italics denotes franchise record.

== Awards and honors ==
=== Awards ===
Regular season
Player	Award	Date
Anders Lee	King Clancy Memorial Trophy	May 28, 2024

== Transactions ==
The Islanders have been involved in the following transactions during the 2023–24 season.

=== Trades ===
Date	Details		Ref
June 29, 2023	To Chicago Blackhawks Josh Bailey; 2nd-round pick in 2026	To New York Islanders Future considerations	
November 26, 2023	To New Jersey Devils Arnaud Durandeau	To New York Islanders Tyce Thompson	
December 8, 2023	To St. Louis Blues 7th-round pick in 2024	To New York Islanders Robert Bortuzzo	
May 24, 2024	To Chicago Blackhawks 1st-round pick in 2024; 2nd-round pick in 2024	To New York Islanders 1st-round pick in 2024; 2nd-round pick in 2024; 2nd-round pick in 2024	

=== Free agents ===
Date	Player	Team	Contract term	Ref
July 1, 2023	Parker Wotherspoon	to Boston Bruins	1-year	
July 5, 2023	Julien Gauthier	from Ottawa Senators	2-year	
July 5, 2023	Karson Kuhlman	from Winnipeg Jets	1-year	
July 5, 2023	Brian Pinho	from New Jersey Devils (Note: Was under contract with the Devils, but played for their AHL affiliate during the 2022–23 season.)	1-year	
July 6, 2023	Cole Bardreau	to Bridgeport Islanders (AHL)	1-year	
July 6, 2023	Jeff Kubiak	to Bridgeport Islanders (AHL)	1-year	
July 27, 2023	Collin Adams	to Kalamazoo Wings (ECHL)	1-year	
August 2, 2023	Blade Jenkins	to Worcester Railers (ECHL)	1-year	
August 3, 2023	Bode Wilde	to HC '05 Banská Bystrica (Slovak Extraliga)	1-year	
January 26, 2024	Zach Parise	to Colorado Avalanche	1-year	
March 22, 2024	Cam Thiesing	from Ohio State Buckeyes (Big Ten)	2-year	
April 16, 2024	Marshall Warren	from Michigan Wolverines (Big Ten)	2-year	
May 7, 2024	Marcus Högberg	from Linköping HC (SHL)	2-year	
May 16, 2024	Maxim Tsyplakov	from HC Spartak Moscow (KHL)	1-year	
June 14, 2024	Robin Salo	to Malmö Redhawks (SHL)	2-year	

=== Waivers ===
Date	Player	Team	Ref
October 10, 2023	Ross Johnston	to Anaheim Ducks	
November 25, 2023	Mike Reilly	from Florida Panthers	

=== Contract terminations ===
Date	Player	Via	Ref
July 7, 2023	Andy Andreoff	Mutual termination	

=== Retirement ===
Date	Player	Ref
September 26, 2023	Cory Schneider	

=== Signings ===
Date	Player	Contract term	Ref
July 1, 2023	Pierre Engvall	7-year	
July 1, 2023	Scott Mayfield	7-year	
July 1, 2023	Ilya Sorokin	8-year	
July 1, 2023	Semyon Varlamov	4-year	
July 17, 2023	Oliver Wahlstrom	1-year	
July 18, 2023	Jakub Škarek	2-year	
September 13, 2023	Isaiah George	3-year	
April 19, 2024	Alex Jefferies	2-year	
April 19, 2024	Henrik Tikkanen	2-year	
June 19, 2024	Kyle MacLean	3-year	

== Draft picks ==
Below are the New York Islanders' selections at the 2023 NHL entry draft, which was held on June 28 and 29, 2023, at Bridgestone Arena in Nashville, Tennessee.

Round	#	Player	Pos	Nationality	College/junior/club team
2	49	Danny Nelson	C	United States	U.S. NTDP (USHL)
4	113	Jesse Nurmi	RW	Finland	KooKoo (Liiga)
5	145	Justin Gill	C	Canada	Sherbrooke Phoenix (QMJHL)
6	177	Zachary Schulz	D	United States	U.S. NTDP (USHL)
7	209	Dennis Good Bogg	D	Sweden	AIK IF U20 (J20 Nationell)
