= Tobias Björnfot =

Swedish ice hockey player (born 2001)

- Born: 6 April 2001 (age 25) Upplands Väsby, Sweden
- Height: 6 ft 0 in (183 cm)
- Weight: 200 lb (91 kg; 14 st 4 lb)
- Position: Defence
- Shoots: Left
- NHL team (P) Cur. team Former teams: Florida Panthers; Charlotte Checkers (AHL); Djurgårdens IF; Los Angeles Kings; Vegas Golden Knights
- NHL draft: 22nd overall, 2019; Los Angeles Kings
- Playing career: 2018–present

Tobias Björnfot (born 6 April 2001) is a Swedish professional ice hockey defenceman for the Charlotte Checkers of the American Hockey League (AHL) while under contract to the Florida Panthers of the National Hockey League (NHL). He was drafted 22nd overall by the Los Angeles Kings in the first round of the 2019 NHL entry draft.

== Playing career ==
During the 2018–19 season, Björnfot made his SHL and professional debut with Djurgårdens IF on 20 October 2018.

On 21 June 2019, Björnfot was the second player to be selected by the Los Angeles Kings in the 2019 NHL entry draft, taken in the first round with the 22nd overall pick, which the Kings acquired from the Toronto Maple Leafs in a trade that sent Jake Muzzin to Toronto. On 14 July 2019, he was signed to a three-year, entry-level contract by the Kings.

On 8 August 2020, approaching the second year of his entry-level contract he was loaned by Los Angeles to his Swedish club, Djurgårdens IF, to continue his development before the commencement of the delayed North American 2020–21 season due to the COVID-19 pandemic.

On 3 January 2024, after playing just one game for the Kings over the first three months of the 2023–24 season, Björnfot was placed on waivers before being claimed by the Vegas Golden Knights one day later. He subsequently debuted for Vegas three days later on 6 January, against the New York Islanders. After playing only two games with Vegas, Björnfot suffered an undisclosed injury, and was placed on injured reserve. Upon his return from IR, Björnfot was waived by Vegas, and subsequently claimed by the Florida Panthers on 8 March 2024.

On 14 July 2025, Björnfot signed a one-year, two-way contract to remain with the Panthers organization.

== Career statistics ==
=== Regular season and playoffs ===
			Regular season					Playoffs
Season	Team	League	GP	G	A	Pts	PIM	GP	G	A	Pts	PIM
2017–18	Djurgårdens IF	J20	42	6	16	22	8	3	0	1	1	0
2018–19	Djurgårdens IF	J20	39	11	11	22	14	7	1	2	3	0
2018–19	Djurgårdens IF	SHL	7	0	0	0	2	4	0	0	0	0
2019–20	Ontario Reign	AHL	44	6	13	19	12	—	—	—	—	—
2019–20	Los Angeles Kings	NHL	3	0	0	0	0	—	—	—	—	—
2020–21	Djurgårdens IF	SHL	15	1	2	3	33	—	—	—	—	—
2020–21	Ontario Reign	AHL	1	0	0	0	2	—	—	—	—	—
2020–21	Los Angeles Kings	NHL	33	1	5	6	14	—	—	—	—	—
2021–22	Los Angeles Kings	NHL	70	0	8	8	6	—	—	—	—	—
2022–23	Ontario Reign	AHL	50	5	7	12	8	2	0	0	0	0
2022–23	Los Angeles Kings	NHL	10	0	1	1	6	—	—	—	—	—
2023–24	Henderson Silver Knights	AHL	5	0	0	0	4	—	—	—	—	—
2023–24	Ontario Reign	AHL	9	0	0	0	2	—	—	—	—	—
2023–24	Los Angeles Kings	NHL	1	0	0	0	0	—	—	—	—	—
2023–24	Vegas Golden Knights	NHL	2	0	0	0	2	—	—	—	—	—
2023–24	Florida Panthers	NHL	1	0	0	0	0	—	—	—	—	—
2024–25	Florida Panthers	NHL	14	0	0	0	2	—	—	—	—	—
2024–25	Charlotte Checkers	AHL	50	3	15	18	24	14	2	5	7	14
2025–26	Charlotte Checkers	AHL	33	4	8	12	10	3	2	0	2	2
2025–26	Florida Panthers	NHL	19	2	2	4	2	—	—	—	—	—
SHL totals			22	1	2	3	35	4	0	0	0	0
NHL totals			153	3	16	19	32	—	—	—	—	—

Medal record

Representing Sweden

Ice hockey

World Junior Championships
Bronze medal – third place	2020 Czech Republic	

World U18 Championships
Gold medal – first place	2019 Sweden	
Bronze medal – third place	2018 Russia	

=== International ===
Year	Team	Event	Result	GP	G	A	Pts	PIM
2017	Sweden	U17	8th	5	1	0	1	0
2018	Sweden	U18	3rd place, bronze medalist(s)	7	0	0	0	2
2018	Sweden	HG18	2nd place, silver medalist(s)	5	0	1	1	2
2019	Sweden	U18	1st place, gold medalist(s)	7	0	1	1	6
2020	Sweden	WJC	3rd place, bronze medalist(s)	7	0	0	0	0
2021	Sweden	WJC	5th	5	0	2	2	0
Junior totals				36	1	4	5	10

Awards and achievements
Preceded by Alex Turcotte	Los Angeles Kings first-round draft pick 2019	Succeeded by Quinton Byfield
