= 2023–24 Tampa Bay Lightning season =

National Hockey League season

2023–24 Tampa Bay Lightning
- Division: 4th Atlantic
- Conference: 6th Eastern
- 2023–24 record: 45–29–8
- Home record: 25–11–5
- Road record: 20–18–3
- Goals for: 291
- Goals against: 268

Team information
- General manager: Julien BriseBois
- Coach: Jon Cooper
- Captain: Steven Stamkos
- Alternate captains: Victor Hedman; Nikita Kucherov
- Arena: Amalie Arena
- Average attendance: 19,092
- Minor league affiliates: Syracuse Crunch (AHL); Orlando Solar Bears (ECHL)

Team leaders
- Goals: Brayden Point (46)
- Assists: Nikita Kucherov (100)
- Points: Nikita Kucherov (144)
- Penalty minutes: Mikey Eyssimont (104)
- Plus/minus: Victor Hedman (+18)
- Wins: Andrei Vasilevskiy (30)
- Goals against average: Andrei Vasilevskiy (2.90)

The 2023–24 Tampa Bay Lightning season was the 32nd season for the National Hockey League (NHL) franchise that was established on December 16, 1991.

On April 5, 2024, the Lightning clinched a playoff spot for the seventh consecutive season after losses by the Detroit Red Wings, Philadelphia Flyers and Washington Capitals. They were eliminated in the first round by their intrastate rival and eventual Stanley Cup champions, the Florida Panthers, in five games.

== Off-season ==
=== April ===
The Lightning's off-season began after losing to the Toronto Maple Leafs in the first round of the Stanley Cup playoffs in six games.

=== May ===
On May 1, 2023, the Lightning signed forward prospect Maxim Groshev to a three-year entry-level contract. Groshev was originally selected by the Lightning in the third round of the 2020 NHL entry draft. Groshev appeared in 34 games this past season with SKA Saint Petersburg of the KHL, recording four goals and six points. Groshev also played in the VHL with SKA-Neva St. Petersburg.

On May 2, 2023, Brayden Point was announced as a finalist for the Lady Byng Trophy. Point recorded career in both goals (51) a points (95) this past season while averaging slightly under 20 minutes a night. During the season point only recorded 7 total penalty minutes.

On May 5, 2023, the Lightning re-signed Michael Eyssimont to a two-year contract extension that careers an annual cap hit of 800k. The team acquired him this past season in a trade with the San Jose Sharks. In the playoffs Eyssimont recorded two points in the series against the Toronto Maple Leafs.

May 10, 2023, the Lightning signed free agent goaltender Matt Tomkins to a two-year contract. Notably Thomkins played in 3 games for Team Canada in the 2022 Olympics. Thomkins had spent the past two seasons playing for Farjestad BK in the Swedish Hockey League.

=== June ===
On June 5, 2023, the Lightning signed free agent forward Waltteri Merela to a one-year contract. Merela had spent the past two seasons with Tappara in the Finnish Elite League. During that time Merela helped Tappara win back to back championships.

That same day the Lightning also signed free agent defenseman Emil Lilleberg to a two-year contract. Lilleberg spent the last season playing for IK Oskarshamn of the Swedish Hockey League. Lilleberg also represented Norway in the last three World Championships.

On June 14, 2023, the Lightning re-signed forward Cole Koepke to a one-year contract extension. Koepke appeared in 17 games with the team and recorded one goal over that period of time. Koepke also played 52 games with the Syracuse Crunch. He recorded 7 goals and 19 points during his assignment with the Crunch.

On June 21, 2023, the Lightning re-signed forward Gabriel Fortier to a one-year contract extension. Fortier appear in one game with the Lightning last season which brought his career total to 11 NHL games. Fortier also appeared in 67 games with the Crunch last season, recording 11 goals and 29 points.

On June 26, 2023, the Lightning announced a change to the coaching staff of their AHL affiliate the Syracuse Crunch. Benoit Groulx was stepping down as head coach of the Crunch and taking another position within the organization. The Lightning also relieved assistant coaches Gilles Bouchard and Eric Veilleux of their duties. Groulx finishes his stint with the Crunch with a franchise record 256 wins, two division championships, and one conference championship.

The Lightning announced Joel Bouchard as Groulx's replacement in the same press release. Bouchard has previously been a head coach AHL (242 games) between the San Diego Gulls and the Laval Rocket. Bouchard is also a veteran of 364 NHL games and 293 AHL games over his playing career. The Lightning also announced that Daniel Jacob would be joining Bouchard's staff as an assistant coach.

On June 26, 2023, Steven Stamkos was selected as the recipient of the 2023 Mark Messier Leadership Award. The award is given annually to a player "who exemplifies great leadership qualities to his team, on and off the ice, during the regular season and who plays a leading role in his community growing the game of hockey."

On June 28, 2023, the Lightning traded forward Ross Colton to the Colorado Avalanche in exchange for a 2nd-round pick in the 2023 NHL entry draft. Colton was originally acquired by the Lightning in the 4th round of the 2016 NHL entry draft. Colton appeared in 190 games with the Lightning, recording 47 goals and 36 assists. Colton's biggest moment with the team came when he scored the Stanley Cup-clinching goal in game 5 against the Montreal Canadiens.

=== July ===
On July 1, 2023, the Lightning were involved in the following player signings during the first day of NHL free agency.

The Lightning signed Conor Sheary to a three-year contract valued at $6 million. This past season Shear appeared in 82 games with the Washington Capitals, recording 15 goals and 37 points. Sheary has appeared in 531 NHL games between stints with the Capitals, Pittsburgh Penguins and Buffalo Sabres.

The Lightning signed Josh Archibald to a two-year contract with an annual cap hit for $800,000. Last season Archibald appeared in 62 games, recording six goals and six assists. Archibald is also a veteran of 305 career NHL games, recording 45 goals and 38 assists.

The Lightning signed Luke Glendening to a two-year contract worth $1.6 million. Glendening was a member of the Dallas Stars the prior two seasons. Glendening has appeared in 148 career games between the Stars and the Detroit Red Wings, recording 69 goals and 79 assists.

The Lightning signed Jonas Johansson to a two-year contract with a $775,000 annual cap hit. This past season Johansson appeared in three games with the Colorado Avalanche, recording 2 wins and a .932 save percentage.

The Lightning signed Logan Brown to a one-year contract valued at $775,000. Brown was a member of the St. Louis Blues the past two season. This past season Brown skated in 69 games, recording six goals and 17 points. Brown was previously a first-round pick of the Ottawa Senators. Brown enters the season one game shy of reaching 100 career NHL games.

The Lightning signed Mitchell Chaffee to a one-year contract that carries a cap hit of $775,000. Chaffee has appeared in two NHL games, all which came with the Minnesota Wild.

On July 2, 2023, the Lightning signed Calvin de Haan to a one-year contract, which carries a $775,000 cap hit. De Haan appeared in 53 games last season with the Carolina Hurricanes, recording 2 goals and 10 assists. De Haan has 131 career points in his NHL career between the New York Islanders, Hurricanes and Chicago Blackhawks.

On July 15, 2023, the Lightning signed Tanner Jeannot to a two-year contract extension which carries an annual cap hit of $2.66 million. Jeannot was acquired by the Lightning in a trade with the Nashville Predators the previous season.

=== August ===
On August 22, 2023, the Lightning announced the signing of Brandon Hagel to an eight-year contract extension with an AAV of $6.5 million. Hagel posted 30 goals, 34 assists and 64 points in his first full season with the team, all of which were career highs for Hagel.

On August 23, 2023, the Lightning announced the signing of Darren Raddysh to a two-year contract extension valued at $1.95 million. Raddysh recorded a goal and three assists in 17 appearances with the Lighting this past season. Raddysh also skated in 51 games with the Crunch last season.

=== September ===
September 9, 2023, the Lightning announced that it had placed Josh Archibald on waivers for the purposes of termination of his contract. While the exact reason is unknown, Archibald indicated that he did not intend on attending training camp or play this season.

On the same day, the Lightning announced that it had signed Tyler Motte to a one-year contract valued at $800,000. Motte skated in 62 games last season, recording 8 goals and 11 assists for 19 points.

== Training camp ==
On September 19, 2023, the Lightning announced its training camp roster.

Forwards

Tristan Allard, Alex Barre-Boulet, Logan Brown, Joe Carroll, Mitchell Chaffee, Anthony Cirelli, Gabriel Dumont, Jaydon Dureau, Lucas Edmonds, Shawn Element, Mikey Eyssimont, Jack Finley, Gabriel Fortier, Ethan Gauthier, Luke Glendening, Gage Goncalves, Maxim Groshev, Brandon Hagel, Ethan Hay, Tanner Jeannot, Cole Koepke, Nikita Kucherov, Bennett MacArthur, Waltteri Merela, Tyler Motte, Nick Paul, Brayden Point, Felix Robert, Conor Sheary, Steven Stamkos Gabriel Szturc, Ilya Usau, Daniel Walcott, Daniel Walker and Austin Watson.

Defensemen

Zach Bogosian, Declan Carlile, Erik Cernak, Maxwell Crozier, Sean Day, Calvin de Haan, Haydn Fleury, Dyllan Gill, Victor Hedman, Louka Henault, Emil Lilleberg, Philippe Myers, Nick Perbix, Darren Raddysh, Roman Schmidt, Mikhail Sergachev, Devante Stephens, Jack Thompson and Scott Walford.

Goaltenders

Hugo Alnefelt, Evan Fitzpatrick, Ben Gaudreau, Jonas Johansson, Matt Tomkins and Andrei Vasilevskiy

On September 27, 2023, the Lightning announced that it had reduced it training camp roster by four players. Ethan Gauthier, Ethan Hay and Dyllan Gill were release from camp to join their junior teams. Scott Walford was released from his tryout agreement. The cuts reduce the camp roster to 56 players.

On September 28, 2023, the Lightning announced that Andrei Vasilevskiy underwent a microdiscectomy to repair a lumbar disc herniation. Vasilevskiy is expected to miss the first two months of the season due to the surgery. The team stated that it will continue with Jonas Johansson and Matt Tomkins while Vasilevskiy recovers.

On September 30, 2023, the Lightning announced that it had reduced its training camp roster by 30 players. The following players where either assigned to Syracuse or their respective junior clubs: Tristan Allard, Hugo Alnefelt, Logan Brown, Declan Carlile, Joe Carroll, Mitchell Chaffee, Maxwell Crozier, Sean Day, Gabriel Dumont, Lucas Edmonds, Shawn Element, Jack Finley, Evan Fitzpatrick, Ben Gaudreau, Gage Goncalves, Maxim Groshev, Louka Henault, Cole Koepke, Emil Lilleberg, Bennett MacArthur, Philippe Myers, Felix Robert, Roman Schmidt, Devante Stephens, Gabriel Szturc, Jack Thompson, Ilya Usau, Daniel Walcott and Daniel Walker.

On October 8, 2023, the Lightning placed Zach Bogosian and Gabriel Fortier on waivers. Both players cleared the following day and are eligible to be assigned to the Syracuse Crunch.

On October 9, 2023, the Lightning announced that it had signed Austin Watson to a one-year deal. Watson was previously on a PTO agreement prior to signing. The contract will carry a cap hit of $776,655.

That same day the Lightning finalized its roster for opening night. The below forwards, defensemen and goalies were named to the finalized roster.

Forwards

Alex Barre-Boulet, Anthony Cirelli, Mikey Eyssimont, Luke Glendening, Brandon Hagel, Tanner Jeannot, Nikita Kucherov, Waltteri Merela, Tyler Motte, Nick Paul, Brayden Point, Conor Sheary, Steven Stamkos and Austin Watson

Defensemen

Erik Cernak, Calvin de Haan, Haydn Fleury, Victor Hedman, Nick Perbix, Darren Raddysh and Mikhail Sergachev

Goaltenders

Jonas Johansson, Matt Tomkins and Andrei Vasilevskiy (IR)

== Standings ==
=== Divisional standings ===
Atlantic Division
Pos	Team	GP	W	L	OTL	RW	GF	GA	GD	Pts
1	y – Florida Panthers	82	52	24	6	42	268	200	+68	110
2	x – Boston Bruins	82	47	20	15	36	267	224	+43	109
3	x – Toronto Maple Leafs	82	46	26	10	33	303	263	+40	102
4	x – Tampa Bay Lightning	82	45	29	8	37	291	268	+23	98
5	Detroit Red Wings	82	41	32	9	27	278	274	+4	91
6	Buffalo Sabres	82	39	37	6	33	246	244	+2	84
7	Ottawa Senators	82	37	41	4	25	255	281	−26	78
8	Montreal Canadiens	82	30	36	16	20	236	289	−53	76

Source: National Hockey League
Rules for classification: 1) Fewer number of games played (GP, only during regular season); 2) Greater number of regulation wins (RW); 3) Greater number of wins in regulation and overtime, excluding shootout wins (ROW); 4) Greater number of total wins, including shootouts (W); 5) Greater number of points earned in head-to-head play; if teams played an uneven number of head-to-head games, the result of the first game on the home ice of the team with the extra home game is discarded; 6) Greater goal differential (GD); 7) Greater number of goals scored (GF)
x – Clinched playoff spot; y – Clinched division

=== Conference standings ===
Eastern Conference Wild Card
Pos	Div	Team	GP	W	L	OTL	RW	GF	GA	GD	Pts
1	AT	x – Tampa Bay Lightning	82	45	29	8	37	291	268	+23	98
2	ME	x – Washington Capitals	82	40	31	11	32	220	257	−37	91
3	AT	Detroit Red Wings	82	41	32	9	27	278	274	+4	91
4	ME	Pittsburgh Penguins	82	38	32	12	32	255	251	+4	88
5	ME	Philadelphia Flyers	82	38	33	11	30	235	261	−26	87
6	AT	Buffalo Sabres	82	39	37	6	33	246	244	+2	84
7	ME	New Jersey Devils	82	38	39	5	33	264	283	−19	81
8	AT	Ottawa Senators	82	37	41	4	25	255	281	−26	78
9	AT	Montreal Canadiens	82	30	36	16	20	236	289	−53	76
10	ME	Columbus Blue Jackets	82	27	43	12	21	237	300	−63	66

Source: National Hockey League
Rules for classification: 1) Fewer number of games played (GP, only during regular season); 2) Greater number of regulation wins (RW); 3) Greater number of wins in regulation and overtime, excluding shootout wins (ROW); 4) Greater number of total wins, including shootouts (W); 5) Greater number of points earned in head-to-head play; if teams played an uneven number of head-to-head games, the result of the first game on the home ice of the team with the extra home game is discarded; 6) Greater goal differential (GD); 7) Greater number of goals scored (GF)
x – Clinched playoff spot

== Schedule and results ==
=== Preseason ===
2023 preseason game log: 5–2–0 (Home: 2–1–0; Road: 3–1–0; Neutral: 1–0–0)

Game	Date	Opponent	Score	OT	Decision	Location	Attendance	Record	Recap
1	September 26	@ Carolina Hurricanes	2–5		Alnefelt	PNC Arena	12,430	0–1–0	
2	September 27	@ Nashville Predators	2–1	OT	Tomkins	Bridgestone Arena	17,159	1–1–0	
3	September 29	Carolina Hurricanes	4–0		Johansson	Amalie Arena	13,635	2–1–0	
4	September 30	Nashville Predators	5–4		Tomkins	Amalie Arena	14,197	3–1–0	
5	October 3	vs. Florida Panthers	2–0		Johansson	Amway Center	16,802	4–1–0	
6	October 5	Florida Panthers	3–6		Tomkins	Amalie Arena	12,294	4–2–0	
7	October 7	@ Florida Panthers	4–2		Johansson	Amerant Bank Arena	13,780	5–2–0	

Lightning score listed first;

Win Loss Overtime/shootout loss

=== Regular season ===
2023–24 game log
October: 4–2–3, 11 points (Home: 4–0–2; Road: 0–2–1)

Game	Date	Opponent	Score	OT	Decision	Location	Attendance	Record	Points	Recap
1	October 10	Nashville Predators	5–3		Johansson	Amalie Arena	19,092	1–0–0	2	
2	October 14	@ Detroit Red Wings	4–6		Johansson	Little Caesars Arena	19,515	1–1–0	2	
3	October 15	@ Ottawa Senators	2–5		Tomkins	Canadian Tire Centre	15,584	1–2–0	2	
4	October 17	@ Buffalo Sabres	2–3	OT	Johansson	KeyBank Center	12,598	1–2–1	3	
5	October 19	Vancouver Canucks	4–3		Johansson	Amalie Arena	19,092	2–2–1	5	
6	October 21	Toronto Maple Leafs	3–4	OT	Johansson	Amalie Arena	19,092	2–2–2	6	
7	October 24	Carolina Hurricanes	3–0		Johansson	Amalie Arena	19,092	3–2–2	8	
8	October 26	San Jose Sharks	6–0		Johansson	Amalie Arena	19,092	4–2–2	10	
9	October 30	Seattle Kraken	3–4	OT	Johansson	Amalie Arena	19,092	4–2–3	11	

November: 6–7–2, 14 points (Home: 2–3–1; Road: 4–4–1)

Game	Date	Opponent	Score	OT	Decision	Location	Attendance	Record	Points	Recap
10	November 2	@ Columbus Blue Jackets	2–4		Tomkins	Nationwide Arena	14,276	4–3–3	11	
11	November 4	@ Ottawa Senators	6–4		Johansson	Canadian Tire Centre	17,387	5–3–3	13	
12	November 6	@ Toronto Maple Leafs	5–6	OT	Johansson	Scotiabank Arena	18,445	5–3–4	14	
13	November 7	@ Montreal Canadiens	5–3		Tomkins	Bell Centre	21,105	6–3–4	16	
14	November 9	Chicago Blackhawks	3–5		Johansson	Amalie Arena	19,092	6–4–4	16	
15	November 11	Carolina Hurricanes	0–4		Johansson	Amalie Arena	19,092	6–5–4	16	
16	November 14	@ St. Louis Blues	0–5		Johansson	Enterprise Center	17,621	6–6–4	16	
17	November 16	@ Chicago Blackhawks	4–2		Johansson	United Center	18,691	7–6–4	18	
18	November 18	Edmonton Oilers	6–4		Johansson	Amalie Arena	19,092	8–6–4	20	
19	November 20	Boston Bruins	5–4	OT	Johansson	Amalie Arena	19,092	9–6–4	22	
20	November 22	Winnipeg Jets	2–3	OT	Johansson	Amalie Arena	19,092	9–6–5	23	
21	November 24	@ Carolina Hurricanes	8–2		Vasilevskiy	PNC Arena	18,802	10–6–5	25	
22	November 27	@ Colorado Avalanche	1–4		Vasilevskiy	Ball Arena	18,009	10–7–5	25	
23	November 28	@ Arizona Coyotes	1–3		Vasilevskiy	Mullett Arena	4,600	10–8–5	25	
24	November 30	Pittsburgh Penguins	2–4		Vasilevskiy	Amalie Arena	19,092	10–9–5	25	

December: 8–6–0, 16 points (Home: 5–2–0; Road: 3–4–0)

Game	Date	Opponent	Score	OT	Decision	Location	Attendance	Record	Points	Recap
25	December 2	@ Dallas Stars	1–8		Vasilevskiy	American Airlines Center	18,532	10–10–5	25	
26	December 4	Dallas Stars	4–0		Vasilevskiy	Amalie Arena	19,092	11–10–5	27	
27	December 6	Pittsburgh Penguins	3–1		Vasilevskiy	Amalie Arena	19,092	12–10–5	29	
28	December 7	@ Nashville Predators	1–5		Johansson	Bridgestone Arena	17,159	12–11–5	29	
29	December 9	@ Seattle Kraken	4–3	OT	Vasilevskiy	Climate Pledge Arena	17,151	13–11–5	31	
30	December 12	@ Vancouver Canucks	1–4		Vasilevskiy	Rogers Arena	18,771	13–12–5	31	
31	December 14	@ Edmonton Oilers	7–4		Vasilevskiy	Rogers Place	18,060	14–12–5	33	
32	December 16	@ Calgary Flames	2–4		Vasilevskiy	Scotiabank Saddledome	16,081	14–13–5	33	
33	December 19	St. Louis Blues	6–1		Vasilevskiy	Amalie Arena	19,092	15–13–5	35	
34	December 21	Vegas Golden Knights	5–4		Vasilevskiy	Amalie Arena	19,092	16–13–5	37	
35	December 23	@ Washington Capitals	2–1	SO	Vasilevskiy	Capital One Arena	18,573	17–13–5	39	
36	December 27	Florida Panthers	2–3		Vasilevskiy	Amalie Arena	19,092	17–14–5	39	
37	December 30	New York Rangers	1–5		Vasilevskiy	Amalie Arena	19,092	17–15–5	39	
38	December 31	Montreal Canadiens	4–3		Johansson	Amalie Arena	19,092	18–15–5	41	

January: 9–3–0, 18 points (Home: 6–0–0; Road: 3–3–0)

Game	Date	Opponent	Score	OT	Decision	Location	Attendance	Record	Points	Recap
39	January 2	@ Winnipeg Jets	2–4		Vasilevskiy	Canada Life Centre	14,157	18–16–5	41	
40	January 4	@ Minnesota Wild	4–1		Vasilevskiy	Xcel Energy Center	18,689	19–16–5	43	
41	January 6	@ Boston Bruins	3–7		Vasilevskiy	TD Garden	17,850	19–17–5	43	
42	January 9	Los Angeles Kings	3–2	OT	Vasilevskiy	Amalie Arena	19,092	20–17–5	45	
43	January 11	New Jersey Devils	4–3	OT	Vasilevskiy	Amalie Arena	19,092	21–17–5	47	
44	January 13	Anaheim Ducks	5–1		Vasilevskiy	Amalie Arena	19,092	22–17–5	49	
45	January 18	Minnesota Wild	7–3		Vasilevskiy	Amalie Arena	19,092	23–17–5	51	
46	January 20	@ Buffalo Sabres	3–1		Johansson	KeyBank Center	18,246	24–17–5	53	
47	January 21	@ Detroit Red Wings	1–2		Vasilevskiy	Little Caesars Arena	19,515	24–18–5	53	
48	January 23	@ Philadelphia Flyers	6–3		Vasilevskiy	Wells Fargo Center	17,937	25–18–5	55	
49	January 25	Arizona Coyotes	6–3		Vasilevskiy	Amalie Arena	19,092	26–18–5	57	
50	January 27	New Jersey Devils	6–3		Vasilevskiy	Amalie Arena	19,092	27–18–5	59	

February: 5–6–1, 11 points (Home: 1–3–1; Road: 4–3–0)

Game	Date	Opponent	Score	OT	Decision	Location	Attendance	Record	Points	Recap
All-Star Break (February 1–4)
51	February 7	@ New York Rangers	1–3		Vasilevskiy	Madison Square Garden	17,208	27–19–5	59	
52	February 8	@ New York Islanders	2–6		Johansson	UBS Arena	17,255	27–20–5	59	
53	February 10	@ Columbus Blue Jackets	4–2		Vasilevskiy	Nationwide Arena	18,876	28–20–5	61	
54	February 13	@ Boston Bruins	3–2	SO	Vasilevskiy	TD Garden	17,850	29–20–5	63	
55	February 15	Colorado Avalanche	6–3		Vasilevskiy	Amalie Arena	19,092	30–20–5	65	
56	February 17	Florida Panthers	2–9		Vasilevskiy	Amalie Arena	19,092	30–21–5	65	
57	February 19	Ottawa Senators	2–4		Vasilevskiy	Amalie Arena	19,092	30–22–5	65	
58	February 22	Washington Capitals	3–5		Vasilevskiy	Amalie Arena	19,092	30–23–5	65	
59	February 24	@ New York Islanders	4–2		Vasilevskiy	UBS Arena	17,255	31–23–5	67	
60	February 25	@ New Jersey Devils	4–1		Johansson	Prudential Center	16,514	32–23–5	69	
61	February 27	@ Philadelphia Flyers	2–6		Vasilevskiy	Wells Fargo Center	18,647	32–24–5	69	
62	February 29	Buffalo Sabres	2–3	OT	Vasilevskiy	Amalie Arena	19,092	32–24–6	70	

March: 9–1–1, 19 points (Home: 5–1–0; Road: 4–0–1)

Game	Date	Opponent	Score	OT	Decision	Location	Attendance	Record	Points	Recap
63	March 2	Montreal Canadiens	4–3	SO	Vasilevskiy	Amalie Arena	19,092	33–24–6	72	
64	March 7	Calgary Flames	3–6		Vasilevskiy	Amalie Arena	19,092	33–25–6	72	
65	March 9	Philadelphia Flyers	7–0		Vasilevskiy	Amalie Arena	19,092	34–25–6	74	
66	March 14	New York Rangers	6–3		Vasilevskiy	Amalie Arena	19,092	35–25–6	76	
67	March 16	@ Florida Panthers	5–3		Vasilevskiy	Amerant Bank Arena	19,396	36–25–6	78	
68	March 19	@ Vegas Golden Knights	5–3		Vasilevskiy	T-Mobile Arena	17,789	37–25–6	80	
69	March 21	@ San Jose Sharks	4–1		Vasilevskiy	SAP Center	10,315	38–25–6	82	
70	March 23	@ Los Angeles Kings	3–4	OT	Vasilevskiy	Crypto.com Arena	18,318	38–25–7	83	
71	March 24	@ Anaheim Ducks	3–2	OT	Johansson	Honda Center	16,152	39–25–7	85	
72	March 27	Boston Bruins	3–1		Vasilevskiy	Amalie Arena	19,092	40–25–7	87	
73	March 30	New York Islanders	4–1		Vasilevskiy	Amalie Arena	19,092	41–25–7	89	

April: 4–4–1, 9 points (Home: 2–2–1; Road: 2–2–0)

Game	Date	Opponent	Score	OT	Decision	Location	Attendance	Record	Points	Recap
74	April 1	Detroit Red Wings	2–4		Vasilevskiy	Amalie Arena	19,092	41–26–7	89	
75	April 3	@ Toronto Maple Leafs	4–1		Vasilevskiy	Scotiabank Arena	18,648	42–26–7	91	
76	April 4	@ Montreal Canadiens	7–4		Tomkins	Bell Centre	21,105	43–26–7	93	
77	April 6	@ Pittsburgh Penguins	4–5		Vasilevskiy	PPG Paints Arena	18,383	43–27–7	93	
78	April 9	Columbus Blue Jackets	5–2		Vasilevskiy	Amalie Arena	19,092	44–27–7	95	
79	April 11	Ottawa Senators	2–3	SO	Tomkins	Amalie Arena	19,092	44–27–8	96	
80	April 13	@ Washington Capitals	2–4		Vasilevskiy	Capital One Arena	18,573	44–28–8	96	
81	April 15	Buffalo Sabres	2–4		Vasilevskiy	Amalie Arena	19,092	44–29–8	96	
82	April 17	Toronto Maple Leafs	6–4		Tomkins	Amalie Arena	19,092	45–29–8	98	

Lightning score listed first;

Win Loss Overtime/shootout loss

=== Playoffs ===
2024 Stanley Cup playoffs
Eastern Conference first round vs. Florida Panthers (A1) - Florida won 4–1

Game	Date	Opponent	Score	OT	Decision	Location	Attendance	Series	Recap
1	April 21	@ Florida Panthers	2–3		Vasilevskiy	Amerant Bank Arena	19,356	0–1	
2	April 23	@ Florida Panthers	2–3	OT	Vasilevskiy	Amerant Bank Arena	19,484	0–2	
3	April 25	Florida Panthers	3–5		Vasilevskiy	Amalie Arena	19,092	0–3	
4	April 27	Florida Panthers	6–3		Vasilevskiy	Amalie Arena	19,092	1–3	
5	April 29	@ Florida Panthers	1–6		Vasilevskiy	Amerant Bank Arena	19,750	1–4	

Lightning score listed first;

Win Loss If necessary

== Player stats ==
Final

=== Skaters ===
Regular season
Player	GP	G	A	Pts	+/−	PIM
Nikita Kucherov	81	44	100	144	8	22
Brayden Point	81	46	44	90	−16	14
Steven Stamkos	79	40	41	81	−21	34
Victor Hedman	78	13	63	76	18	76
Brandon Hagel	82	26	49	75	1	79
Nick Paul	82	24	22	46	−16	27
Anthony Cirelli	80	20	25	45	2	38
Darren Raddysh	82	6	27	33	−3	21
Michael Eyssimont	81	11	14	25	7	104
Nick Perbix	77	2	22	24	8	10
Mikhail Sergachev	34	2	17	19	−16	16
Anthony Duclair^{†}	17	8	7	15	4	6
Conor Sheary	57	4	11	15	−3	12
Tanner Jeannot	55	7	7	14	−10	75
Erik Cernak	69	2	11	13	5	63
Luke Glendening	81	10	1	11	−2	39
Calvin de Haan	59	3	7	10	−9	22
Tyler Motte	69	6	3	9	−8	28
Alex Barre-Boulet	36	6	3	9	−9	10
Mitchell Chaffee	30	4	3	7	2	4
Haydn Fleury	24	1	4	5	5	20
Emil Lilleberg	37	0	5	5	−15	16
Austin Watson	33	2	2	4	2	93
Matt Dumba^{†}	18	0	2	2	−5	33
Max Crozier	13	0	2	2	0	7
Cole Koepke	9	0	2	2	0	0
Waltteri Merela	19	1	0	1	2	4
Philippe Myers	5	0	0	0	−2	2
Zach Bogosian^{‡}	4	0	0	0	0	0
Gage Goncalves	2	0	0	0	0	6
Declan Carlile	1	0	0	0	1	0
Jack Thompson^{‡}	1	0	0	0	0	0

Playoffs
Player	GP	G	A	Pts	+/−	PIM
Victor Hedman	5	1	6	7	−1	0
Nikita Kucherov	5	0	7	7	−1	2
Steven Stamkos	5	5	1	6	−5	2
Brandon Hagel	5	3	2	5	−5	2
Brayden Point	5	2	3	5	−1	2
Nick Paul	5	2	0	2	−4	6
Anthony Duclair	5	0	2	2	−3	0
Anthony Cirelli	5	0	2	2	−6	0
Tyler Motte	5	1	0	1	−1	2
Erik Cernak	5	0	1	1	0	2
Tanner Jeannot	4	0	1	1	−2	2
Mikhail Sergachev	2	0	1	1	−3	0
Luke Glendening	5	0	0	0	0	0
Matt Dumba	5	0	0	0	−2	0
Michael Eyssimont	5	0	0	0	−2	2
Mitchell Chaffee	5	0	0	0	−1	2
Emil Lilleberg	5	0	0	0	−3	0
Darren Raddysh	3	0	0	0	0	0
Max Crozier	3	0	0	0	−1	2
Nick Perbix	2	0	0	0	0	2
Calvin de Haan	1	0	0	0	0	0

=== Goaltenders ===
Regular season
Player	GP	GS	TOI	W	L	OT	GA	GAA	SA	SV%	SO	G	A	PIM
Andrei Vasilevskiy	52	52	3062:52	30	20	2	148	2.90	1477	.900	2	0	2	2
Jonas Johansson	26	24	1477:29	12	7	5	83	3.37	752	.890	2	0	0	0
Matt Tomkins	6	6	360:12	3	2	1	20	3.33	185	.892	0	0	0	0

Playoffs
Player	GP	GS	TOI	W	L	GA	GAA	SA	SV%	SO	G	A	PIM
Andrei Vasilevskiy	5	5	298:06	1	4	16	3.22	156	.897	0	0	0	0

^{†}Denotes player spent time with another team before joining Tampa Bay. Stats reflect time with Tampa Bay only.
^{‡}Traded from Tampa Bay mid-season.
Bold/italics denotes franchise record

== Suspensions/fines ==
Player	Explanation	Length	Salary	Date issued
Austin Watson	Fined for Unsportsmanlike Conduct during the game against the Nashville Predators on December 7, 2023, at Bridgestone Arena	—	$2,022.57	December 8, 2023

== Awards and honours ==
=== Awards ===
Regular season
Player	Award	Awarded
Jonas Johansson	NHL Second Star of the Week	October 30, 2023
Nikita Kucherov	NHL Second Star of the Week	November 27, 2023
Nikita Kucherov	NHL First Star of the Month	December 1, 2023
Nikita Kucherov	NHL First Star of the Week	December 11, 2023
Nikita Kucherov	2024 National Hockey League All-Star Game	January 4, 2024
Nikita Kucherov	NHL First Star of the Week	January 29, 2024
Nikita Kucherov	NHL First Star of the Week	March 18, 2024
Nikita Kucherov	NHL First Star of the Week	April 8, 2024
Nikita Kucherov	2023–2024 Art Ross Trophy winner	April 18, 2024

=== Milestones ===
Regular season
Player	Milestone	Reached
Waltteri Merela	1st career NHL game	October 10, 2023
Brayden Point	500th career NHL game	October 10, 2023
Matt Tomkins	1st career NHL game	October 15, 2023
Jon Cooper	800th career NHL game	October 15, 2023
Erik Cernak	300th career NHL game	October 17, 2023
Brayden Point	2nd career NHL hat-trick	November 4, 2023
Matt Tomkins	1st career NHL win	November 7, 2023
Mikhail Sergachev	200th career NHL assist	November 9, 2023
Cole Koepke	1st career NHL assist	November 18, 2023
Brayden Point	3rd career NHL hat-trick	November 24, 2023
Victor Hedman	1000th career NHL game	December 4, 2023
Anthony Cirelli	200th career NHL point	December 6, 2023
Tanner Jeannot	200th career NHL game	December 7, 2023
Calvin de Haan	600th career NHL game	December 14, 2023
Steven Stamkos	12th career NHL hat-trick	December 14, 2023
Nick Perbix	100th career NHL game	December 19, 2023
Brayden Point	500th career NHL point	December 21, 2023
Nikita Kucherov	300th career NHL goal	December 27, 2023
Austin Watson	500th career NHL game	December 31, 2023
Declan Carlile	1st career NHL game	January 4, 2024
Emil Lilleberg	1st career NHL game	January 6, 2024
Jack Thompson	1st career NHL game	January 6, 2024
Emil Lilleberg	1st career NHL assist 1st career NHL point	January 9, 2024
Jon Cooper	500th career NHL win	January 9, 2024
Gage Goncalves	1st career NHL game	January 11, 2024
Max Crozier	1st career NHL game	January 13, 2024
Nikita Kucherov	800th career NHL point	January 13, 2024
Waltteri Merela	1st career NHL goal 1st career NHL point	January 18, 2024
Nikita Kucherov	500th career NHL assist	January 18, 2024
Mikey Eyssimont	100th career NHL game	January 20, 2024
Max Crozier	1st career NHL assist 1st career NHL point	January 23, 2024
Nikita Kucherov	5th career NHL hat-trick	January 23, 2024
Anthony Cirelli	400th career NHL game	January 25, 2024
Mitchell Chaffee	1st career NHL goal 1st career NHL assist 1st career NHL point	January 25, 2024
Steven Stamkos	1100th career NHL point	January 25, 2024
Victor Hedman	700th career NHL point	January 27, 2024
Nikita Kucherov	700th career NHL game	February 19, 2024
Brayden Point	4th career NHL hat-trick	March 14, 2024
Nick Paul	400th career NHL game	March 27, 2024
Brandon Hagel	200th career NHL point	April 3, 2024
Anthony Duclair	300th career NHL point	April 9, 2024
Steven Stamkos	13th career NHL hat-trick	April 9, 2024
Darren Raddysh	100th career NHL game	April 11, 2024
Tyler Motte	400th career NHL game	April 11, 2024

Playoffs
Player	Milestone	Reached
Mitchell Chaffee	1st career playoff game	April 21, 2024
Emil Lilleberg	1st career playoff game	April 21, 2024
Max Crozier	1st career playoff game	April 23, 2024
Anthony Cirelli	100th career playoff game	April 23, 2024
Steven Stamkos	100th career playoff point	April 27, 2024
Mikhail Sergachev	100th career playoff game	April 29, 2024

=== Records ===
Regular season
Player	Record	Reached
Victor Hedman	Tenth-most goals in Tampa Bay Lightning history. Hedman passed Ondrej Palat (143).	October 14, 2023
Brayden Point	Seventh-most points in Tampa Bay Lightning history. Point passed Alex Killorn (466).	October 17, 2023
Victor Hedman	Tied for ninth-most goals in Tampa Bay Lightning history. Hedman tied Fredrik Modin (145).	November 4, 2023
Nikita Kucherov	Most five-point games in Tampa Bay Lightning history. Kucherov passed Vincent Lecavalier (3).	November 4, 2023
Victor Hedman	Ninth-most goals in Tampa Bay Lightning history. Hedman passed Fredrik Modin (145).	November 6, 2023
Nikita Kucherov	Sixth-most games played in Tampa Bay Lightning history. Kucherov passed Pavel Kubina (662).	November 22, 2023
Brayden Point	Sixth-most points in Tampa Bay Lightning history. Point passed Brad Richards (489).	November 24, 2023
Nikita Kucherov	Most points in a single game in Tampa Bay Lightning history. Kucherov tied Doug Crossman (6).	November 24, 2023
Victor Hedman	Third player in Tampa Bay Lightning history to play 1,000 career games with the franchise. Hedman was also the first defensemen in franchise history to play 1,000 games.	December 4, 2023
Nikita Kucherov	Most consecutive games with an assist in Tampa Bay Lighting history (11). Kucherov passed Martin St. Louis and Brad Richards.	December 6, 2023
Steven Stamkos	Most goals in a single game in Tampa Bay Lightning history. Stamkos tied Martin St. Louis and Chris Kontos (4).	December 14, 2023
Steven Stamkos	Most shots in Tampa Bay Lightning history. Stamkos passed Vincent Lecavalier (3,166).	December 19, 2023
Brayden Point	Sixth player in Tampa Bay Lightning history to record 500 career points with the franchise.	December 21, 2023
Nikita Kucherov	Fourth player in Tampa Bay Lightning history to record 300 career goals with the franchise.	December 27, 2023
Steven Stamkos	Most games played in Tampa Bay Lightning history. Stamkos passed Vincent Lecavalier (1,037).	December 31, 2023
Nikita Kucherov	Fourth-most assists in Tampa Bay Lightning history. Kucherov passed Vincent Lecavalier (491).	January 7, 2024
Brayden Point	Eighth-most assists in Tampa Bay Lightning history. Point passed Alex Killorn (268).	January 13, 2024
Nikita Kucherov	Fourth player in Tampa Bay Lightning history to record 800 career points with the team.	January 13, 2024
Victor Hedman	Eighth-most goals in Tampa Bay Lightning history. Hedman passed Brad Richards (150).	January 18, 2024
Nikita Kucherov	Fourth player in Tampa Bay Lightning history to record 500 assists.	January 18, 2024
Victor Hedman	First defensemen to record 700 career points in Tampa Bay Lightning history. Hedman is also the fifth Lightning player to record 700 points in team history.	January 27, 2024
Brayden Point	Tenth-most games played in Tampa Bay Lightning history. Point passed Brad Richards (552).	February 13, 2024
Nikita Kucherov	Most multi-assist games in Tampa Bay Lightning history. Kucherov passed Martin St. Louis (121).	February 25, 2024
Nikita Kucherov	Fewest games needed to record 100 points in Tampa Bay Lightning history (59 games). Kucherov passed his prior record (62 games).	February 25, 2024
Darren Raddysh	Most assists in a single game by a Tampa Bay Lightning defenseman (5). Raddysh also tied Martin St. Louis and Mark Recchi for the most assists in a single game by a Tampa Bay Lightning player (5).	March 9, 2024
Darren Raddysh	Tied most points in a single game by a Tampa Bay Lightning defenseman. Raddysh tied Pavel Kubina and Doug Crossman (5).	March 9, 2024
Victor Hedman	Second most games played in Tampa Bay Lightning history. Hedman passed Vincent Lecavalier (1,037).	March 14, 2024
Brayden Point	Tied most points in a single game in Tampa Bay Lightning history. Point tied Nikita Kucherov and Doug Crossman (6).	March 14, 2024
Brayden Point	Tied most hat tricks in a single season in Tampa Bay Lightning history. Point tied Wendel Clark (3).	March 14, 2024
Nikita Kucherov	Most points in a single season in Tampa Bay Lightning history. Kucherov passed his prior record (128).	April 3, 2024
Nikita Kucherov	Most assists in a single season in Tampa Bay Lightning history. Kucherov passed his prior record (87). Kucherov also set the NHL record for most assists in a single season by a winger. Kucherov passed himself and Jaromir Jagr (87).	April 3, 2024
Nikita Kucherov	First player in Tampa Bay Lightning history to record 100 assists in a single season. Kucherov became the fifth player, and first winger, to record 100 assists in a single season.	April 17, 2024

Playoffs
Player	Record	Reached
Anthony Cirelli	Eighth player in Tampa Bay Lightning history to appear in 100 career playoff games with the franchise.	April 23, 2024
Steven Stamkos	Third player in Tampa Bay Lightning history to record 100 points in the playoffs.	April 27, 2024
Mikhail Sergachev	Ninth player in Tampa Bay Lightning history to appear in 100 career playoff games with the franchise.	April 29, 2024

== Transactions ==
The Lightning have been involved in the following transactions during the 2023–24 season.

=== Trades ===
Date	Details		Ref
June 28, 2023	To Colorado Avalanche Ross Colton	To Tampa Bay Lightning 2nd-round pick in 2023	
June 29, 2023	To Chicago Blackhawks Corey Perry	To Tampa Bay Lightning 7th-round pick in 2024	
June 29, 2023	To Nashville Predators 4th-round pick in 2024	To Tampa Bay Lightning 4th-round pick in 2023	
July 2, 2023	To Minnesota Wild Maxim Cajkovic; Patrick Maroon	To Tampa Bay Lightning 7th-round pick in 2024	
November 8, 2023	To Minnesota Wild Zach Bogosian	To Tampa Bay Lightning 7th-round pick in 2025	
March 6, 2024	To Anaheim Ducks Ty Taylor	To Tampa Bay Lightning Adam Henrique	
March 6, 2024	To Edmonton Oilers Adam Henrique	To Tampa Bay Lightning 4th-round pick in 2025	
March 7, 2024	To San Jose Sharks Jack Thompson; 3rd-round pick in 2024	To Tampa Bay Lightning Anthony Duclair; 7th-round pick in 2025	
March 8, 2024	To Arizona Coyotes 5th-round pick in 2027	To Tampa Bay Lightning Matt Dumba; 7th-round pick in 2025	
May 21, 2024	To Nashville Predators 2nd-round pick in 2025; 7th-round pick in 2024	To Tampa Bay Lightning Ryan McDonagh; EDM 4th-round pick in 2024	

=== Free agents ===
Date	Player	Team	Contract term	Ref
July 1, 2023	Mitchell Chaffee	from Minnesota Wild	1-year	
July 1, 2023	Luke Glendening	from Dallas Stars	2-year	
July 1, 2023	Logan Brown	from St. Louis Blues	1-year	
July 1, 2023	Conor Sheary	from Washington Capitals	3-year	
July 1, 2023	Josh Archibald	from Pittsburgh Penguins	2-year	
July 1, 2023	Jonas Johansson	from Colorado Avalanche	2-year	
July 1, 2023	Trevor Carrick	to Anaheim Ducks	1-year	
July 1, 2023	Ian Cole	to Vancouver Canucks	1-year	
July 1, 2023	Alex Killorn	to Anaheim Ducks	4-year	
July 2, 2023	Calvin de Haan	from Carolina Hurricanes	1-year	
July 4, 2023	Rudolfs Balcers	to ZSC Lions	1-year	
September 9, 2023	Tyler Motte	from New York Rangers	1-year	
October 9, 2023	Austin Watson	from Ottawa Senators	1-year	
March 1, 2024	Milo Roelens	from Acadie–Bathurst Titan	3-year	
March 2, 2024	Gabriel Szturc	from Kelowna Rockets	3-year	
June 11, 2024	Waltteri Merela	to SC Bern	1-year	

=== Waivers ===
Date	Player	Team	Ref

=== Contract terminations ===
Date	Player	Via	Ref
September 9, 2023	Josh Archibald	Contract termination	
May 26, 2024	Ilya Usau	Contract termination	

=== Retirement ===
Date	Player	Ref

=== Signings ===
Key:

† Contract is entry-level.

Date	Player	Contract term	Ref
June 21, 2023	Gabriel Fortier	1-year	
July 17, 2023	Tanner Jeannot	2-year	
August 22, 2023	Brandon Hagel	8-year	
August 23, 2023	Darren Raddysh	2-year	
December 14, 2023	Ethan Gauthier	3-year†	
April 15, 2024	Dylan Duke	3-year†	
May 16, 2024	Mitchell Chaffee	2-year	
May 17, 2024	Niko Huuhtanen	3-year†	
June 6, 2024	Declan Carlile	2-year	
June 17, 2024	Gabriel Fortier	1-year	
June 21, 2024	Gage Goncalves	1-year	

== Draft picks ==
Below are the Tampa Bay Lightning's selections at the 2023 NHL entry draft, which was held on June 28 and 29, 2023, at the Bridgestone Arena in Nashville, Tennessee.

Round	#	Player	Pos	Nationality	College/Junior/Club team (League)
2	37^{1}	Ethan Gauthier	RW	Canada	Sherbrooke Phoenix (QMJHL)
4	115^{2}	Jayson Shaugabay	RW	United States	Green Bay Gamblers (USHL)
6	179	Warren Clark	D	Canada	Steinbach Pistons (MJHL)
7	193^{3}	Jack Harvey	C	United States	Chicago Steel (USHL)
7	211	Ethan Hay	C	Canada	Flint Firebirds (OHL)

Notes:

1. The Montreal Canadiens' second-round pick went to the Tampa Bay Lightning as the result of a trade on June 28, 2023, that sent Ross Colton to Colorado in exchange for this pick.
2. The Tampa Bay Lightning's fourth-round pick was re-acquired as the result of a trade on June 29, 2023, that sent Chicago's fourth-round pick in 2024 to Tampa Bay in exchange for this pick.
3. The Anaheim Ducks' seventh-round pick will go to the Tampa Bay Lightning as the result of a trade on March 24, 2021, that sent Alexander Volkov to Anaheim in exchange for Antoine Morand and this pick (being conditional at the time of the trade). The condition—Tampa Bay will receive a seventh-round pick in 2023 if the pick is available at the time of the selection—was converted when the pick became available after earlier conditional trades with Columbus and Edmonton were resolved on April 8, 2021.
