= 2023–24 San Jose Sharks season =

National Hockey League season

2023–24 San Jose Sharks
- Division: 8th Pacific
- Conference: 16th Western
- 2023–24 record: 19–54–9
- Home record: 11–25–5
- Road record: 8–29–4
- Goals for: 181
- Goals against: 331

Team information
- General manager: Mike Grier
- Coach: David Quinn
- Captain: Logan Couture
- Alternate captains: Mario Ferraro; Tomas Hertl (Oct. 12 – Mar. 8); Rotating (Mar. 8 – Apr. 18)
- Arena: SAP Center
- Average attendance: 13,559
- Minor league affiliates: San Jose Barracuda (AHL); Wichita Thunder (ECHL)

Team leaders
- Goals: Fabian Zetterlund (24)
- Assists: Mikael Granlund (48)
- Points: Mikael Granlund (60)
- Penalty minutes: Luke Kunin (83)
- Plus/minus: Logan Couture; Shakir Mukhamadullin; Scott Sabourin (0)
- Wins: Mackenzie Blackwood (10)
- Goals against average: Georgi Romanov (1.01)

The 2023–24 San Jose Sharks season was the 33rd season for the National Hockey League (NHL) franchise that was established on May 9, 1990.

On March 12, 2024, the Sharks were eliminated from playoff contention for the fifth consecutive season with their 3–2 loss to the Philadelphia Flyers and a 5–4 overtime win by the Vegas Golden Knights over the Seattle Kraken. The Sharks finished with a total of 47 points, the lowest ever total for an 82-game season with one point awarded for an overtime or shootout loss.

== Standings ==
=== Divisional standings ===
Pacific Division
Pos	Team	GP	W	L	OTL	RW	GF	GA	GD	Pts
1	y – Vancouver Canucks	82	50	23	9	44	279	223	+56	109
2	x – Edmonton Oilers	82	49	27	6	39	294	237	+57	104
3	x – Los Angeles Kings	82	44	27	11	37	256	215	+41	99
4	x – Vegas Golden Knights	82	45	29	8	34	267	245	+22	98
5	Calgary Flames	82	38	39	5	32	253	271	−18	81
6	Seattle Kraken	82	34	35	13	28	217	236	−19	81
7	Anaheim Ducks	82	27	50	5	21	204	295	−91	59
8	San Jose Sharks	82	19	54	9	14	181	331	−150	47

Source: National Hockey League
Rules for classification: 1) Fewer number of games played (GP, only during regular season); 2) Greater number of regulation wins (RW); 3) Greater number of wins in regulation and overtime, excluding shootout wins (ROW); 4) Greater number of total wins, including shootouts (W); 5) Greater number of points earned in head-to-head play; if teams played an uneven number of head-to-head games, the result of the first game on the home ice of the team with the extra home game is discarded; 6) Greater goal differential (GD); 7) Greater number of goals scored (GF)
x – Clinched playoff spot; y – Clinched division

=== Conference standings ===
Western Conference Wild Card
Pos	Div	Team	GP	W	L	OTL	RW	GF	GA	GD	Pts
1	CE	x – Nashville Predators	82	47	30	5	38	269	248	+21	99
2	PA	x – Vegas Golden Knights	82	45	29	8	34	267	245	+22	98
3	CE	St. Louis Blues	82	43	33	6	31	239	250	−11	92
4	CE	Minnesota Wild	82	39	34	9	32	251	263	−12	87
5	PA	Calgary Flames	82	38	39	5	32	253	271	−18	81
6	PA	Seattle Kraken	82	34	35	13	28	217	236	−19	81
7	CE	Arizona Coyotes	82	36	41	5	28	256	274	−18	77
8	PA	Anaheim Ducks	82	27	50	5	21	204	295	−91	59
9	CE	Chicago Blackhawks	82	23	53	6	17	179	290	−111	52
10	PA	San Jose Sharks	82	19	54	9	14	181	331	−150	47

Source: National Hockey League
Rules for classification: 1) Fewer number of games played (GP, only during regular season); 2) Greater number of regulation wins (RW); 3) Greater number of wins in regulation and overtime, excluding shootout wins (ROW); 4) Greater number of total wins, including shootouts (W); 5) Greater number of points earned in head-to-head play; if teams played an uneven number of head-to-head games, the result of the first game on the home ice of the team with the extra home game is discarded; 6) Greater goal differential (GD); 7) Greater number of goals scored (GF)
x – Clinched playoff spot

== Schedule ==
=== Preseason ===
The preseason schedule was announced on June 27, 2023.

Preseason game log

2023 preseason game log: 2–2–2 (home: 1–1–1; away: 1–1–1)
#	Date	Visitor	Score	Home	OT	Decision	Attendance	Record	Recap
1	September 24	Vegas	2–5	San Jose		Kahkonen	9,785	1–0–0	Recap
2	September 26	Anaheim	4–2	San Jose		Blackwood	7,448	1–1–0	Recap
3	September 27	San Jose	2–4	Anaheim		Romanov	10,486	1–2–0	Recap
4	September 30	Los Angeles	2–1	San Jose	OT	Chrona	9,728	1–2–1	Recap
5	October 3	San Jose	2–0	Vegas		Kahkonen	17,406	2–2–1	Recap
6	October 5^{A} ^{a}	San Jose	3–4	Los Angeles	OT	Kahkonen	8,550	2–2–2	Recap

Legend: Win Loss Overtime/shootout loss
^{A} – Frozen Fury
^{a} Played at the Delta Center in Salt Lake City, Utah

=== Regular season ===
The schedule was announced on June 27, 2023.

2023–24 game log: 19–54–9 (home: 11–25–5; away: 8–29–4)

October: 0–8–1 (home: 0–3–1; away: 0–5–0)
#	Date	Visitor	Score	Home	OT	Decision	Attendance	Record	Pts	Recap
1	October 12	Vegas	4–1	San Jose		Kahkonen	17,435	0–1–0	0	Recap
2	October 14	Colorado	2–1	San Jose	SO	Blackwood	17,435	0–1–1	1	Recap
3	October 17	Carolina	6–3	San Jose		Blackwood	10,378	0–2–1	1	Recap
4	October 19	Boston	3–1	San Jose		Kahkonen	12,501	0–3–1	1	Recap
5	October 21	San Jose	1–5	Nashville		Blackwood	17,222	0–4–1	1	Recap
6	October 24	San Jose	1–3	Florida		Blackwood	16,142	0–5–1	1	Recap
7	October 26	San Jose	0–6	Tampa Bay		Blackwood	19,092	0–6–1	1	Recap
8	October 27	San Jose	0–3	Carolina		Kahkonen	18,700	0–7–1	1	Recap
9	October 29	San Jose	1–3	Washington		Blackwood	15,856	0–8–1	1	Recap

November: 5–8–1 (home: 5–3–1; away: 0–5–0)
#	Date	Visitor	Score	Home	OT	Decision	Attendance	Record	Pts	Recap
10	November 2	Vancouver	10–1	San Jose		Kahkonen	10,719	0–9–1	1	Recap
11	November 4	Pittsburgh	10–2	San Jose		Blackwood	17,435	0–10–1	1	Recap
12	November 7	Philadelphia	1–2	San Jose		Blackwood	10,074	1–10–1	3	Recap
13	November 9	Edmonton	2–3	San Jose		Blackwood	12,206	2–10–1	5	Recap
14	November 10	San Jose	0–5	Vegas		Kahkonen	18,423	2–11–1	5	Recap
15	November 12	San Jose	1–4	Anaheim		Blackwood	16,471	2–12–1	5	Recap
16	November 14	Florida	5–3	San Jose		Blackwood	10,108	2–13–1	5	Recap
17	November 16	St. Louis	1–5	San Jose		Kahkonen	10,452	3–13–1	7	Recap
18	November 20	San Jose	1–3	Vancouver		Blackwood	18,718	3–14–1	7	Recap
19	November 22	San Jose	1–7	Seattle		Kahkonen	17,151	3–15–1	7	Recap
20	November 24	Montreal	3–2	San Jose	SO	Blackwood	16,897	3–15–2	8	Recap
21	November 25	Vancouver	3–4	San Jose		Kahkonen	15,538	4–15–2	10	Recap
22	November 27	Washington	1–2	San Jose		Blackwood	10,759	5–15–2	12	Recap
23	November 30	San Jose	0–3	Boston		Blackwood	17,850	5–16–2	12	Recap

December: 4–9–1 (home: 1–3–0; away: 3–6–1)
#	Date	Visitor	Score	Home	OT	Decision	Attendance	Record	Pts	Recap
24	December 1	San Jose	6–3	New Jersey		Kahkonen	16,528	6–16–2	14	Recap
25	December 3	San Jose	5–6	NY Rangers		Blackwood	18,006	6–17–2	14	Recap
26	December 5	San Jose	5–4	NY Islanders	OT	Kahkonen	14,244	7–17–2	16	Recap
27	December 7	San Jose	6–5	Detroit	OT	Kahkonen	19,515	8–17–2	18	Recap
28	December 10	San Jose	4–5	Vegas	SO	Kahkonen	17,849	8–17–3	19	Recap
29	December 12	Winnipeg	1–2	San Jose		Blackwood	17,849	9–17–3	21	Recap
30	December 15	San Jose	0–1	Arizona		Kahkonen	4,600	9–18–3	21	Recap
31	December 17	San Jose	2–6	Colorado		Blackwood	18,093	9–19–3	21	Recap
32	December 19	Los Angeles	4–1	San Jose		Blackwood	11,593	9–20–3	21	Recap
33	December 21	Arizona	5–2	San Jose		Blackwood	17,435	9–21–3	21	Recap
34	December 23	San Jose	4–7	Vancouver		Blackwood	18,875	9–22–3	21	Recap
35	December 27	San Jose	1–5	Los Angeles		Kahkonen	18,145	9–23–3	21	Recap
36	December 28	Edmonton	5–0	San Jose		Chrona	17,435	9–24–3	21	Recap
37	December 31	San Jose	1–3	Colorado		Kahkonen	18,140	9–25–3	21	Recap

January: 5–7–2 (home: 3–4–0; away: 2–3–2)
#	Date	Visitor	Score	Home	OT	Decision	Attendance	Record	Pts	Recap
38	January 2	Detroit	5–3	San Jose		Kahkonen	12,195	9–26–3	21	Recap
39	January 4	Winnipeg	2–1	San Jose		Blackwood	10,521	9–27–3	21	Recap
40	January 6	Toronto	4–1	San Jose		Blackwood	17,435	9–28–3	21	Recap
41	January 9	San Jose	1–7	Toronto		Kahkonen	18,364	9–29–3	21	Recap
42	January 11	San Jose	3–2	Montreal		Blackwood	21,105	10–29–3	23	Recap
43	January 13	San Jose	4–5	Ottawa		Blackwood	18,764	10–30–3	23	Recap
44	January 15	San Jose	0–3	Buffalo		Kahkonen	16,186	10–31–3	23	Recap
45	January 16	San Jose	1–2	Chicago	SO	Blackwood	16,401	10–31–4	24	Recap
46	January 20	Anaheim	3–5	San Jose		Blackwood	17,435	11–31–4	26	Recap
47	January 22	San Jose	4–3	Los Angeles	SO	Kahkonen	18,145	12–31–4	28	Recap
48	January 23	NY Rangers	2–3	San Jose	OT	Blackwood	12,892	13–31–4	30	Recap
49	January 27	Buffalo	5–2	San Jose		Kahkonen	17,435	13–32–4	30	Recap
50	January 30	Seattle	0–2	San Jose		Blackwood	10,988	14–32–4	32	Recap
51	January 31	San Jose	2–3	Anaheim	OT	Kahkonen	15,654	14–32–5	33	Recap

February: 1–6–0 (home: 0–5–0; away: 1–1–0)
#	Date	Visitor	Score	Home	OT	Decision	Attendance	Record	Pts	Recap
52	February 14	San Jose	0–1	Winnipeg		Kahkonen	13,786	14–33–5	33	Recap
53	February 15	San Jose	6–3	Calgary		Blackwood	16,852	15–33–5	35	Recap
54	February 17	Columbus	4–3	San Jose		Kahkonen	17,435	15–34–5	35	Recap
55	February 19	Vegas	4–0	San Jose		Blackwood	17,435	15–35–5	35	Recap
56	February 24	Nashville	4–2	San Jose		Kahkonen	15,919	15–36–5	35	Recap
57	February 27	New Jersey	7–2	San Jose		Kahkonen	10,982	15–37–5	35	Recap
58	February 29	Anaheim	6–4	San Jose		Kahkonen	10,537	15–38–5	35	Recap

March: 2–10–3 (home: 1–3–2; away: 1–7–1)
#	Date	Visitor	Score	Home	OT	Decision	Attendance	Record	Pts	Recap
59	March 2	San Jose	2–3	Dallas	SO	Chrona	18,532	15–38–6	36	Recap
60	March 3	San Jose	3–4	Minnesota		Kahkonen	18,879	15–39–6	36	Recap
61	March 5	Dallas	7–6	San Jose	OT	Kahkonen	10,070	15–39–7	37	Recap
62	March 7	NY Islanders	7–2	San Jose		Chrona	10,077	15–40–7	37	Recap
63	March 9	Ottawa	1–2	San Jose		Chrona	17,008	16–40–7	39	Recap
64	March 12	San Jose	2–3	Philadelphia		Chrona	18,289	16–41–7	39	Recap
65	March 14	San Jose	3–6	Pittsburgh		Chrona	17,027	16–42–7	39	Recap
66	March 16	San Jose	2–4	Columbus		Chrona	16,967	16–43–7	39	Recap
67	March 17	San Jose	2–5	Chicago		Cooley	18,426	16–44–7	39	Recap
68	March 19	San Jose	2–8	Nashville		Chrona	17,159	16–45–7	39	Recap
69	March 21	Tampa Bay	4–1	San Jose		Blackwood	10,315	16–46–7	39	Recap
70	March 23	Chicago	5–4	San Jose	OT	Cooley	17,435	16–46–8	40	Recap
71	March 26	Dallas	6–3	San Jose		Blackwood	12,208	16–47–8	40	Recap
72	March 28	San Jose	1–3	Minnesota		Blackwood	18,589	16–48–8	40	Recap
73	March 30	San Jose	4–0	St. Louis		Blackwood	18,096	17–48–8	42	Recap

April: 2–6–1 (home: 1–4–1; away: 1–2–0)
#	Date	Visitor	Score	Home	OT	Decision	Attendance	Record	Pts	Recap
74	April 1	Seattle	4–2	San Jose		Blackwood	11,559	17–49–8	42	Recap
75	April 4	Los Angeles	2–1	San Jose		Blackwood	12,266	17–50–8	42	Recap
76	April 6	St. Louis	2–3	San Jose	OT	Cooley	15,603	18–50–8	44	Recap
77	April 7	Arizona	5–2	San Jose		Blackwood	11,938	18–51–8	44	Recap
78	April 9	Calgary	3–2	San Jose	OT	Blackwood	11,031	18–51–9	45	Recap
79	April 11	San Jose	3–1	Seattle		Cooley	17,151	19–51–9	47	Recap
80	April 13	Minnesota	6–2	San Jose		Blackwood	17,435	19–52–9	47	Recap
81	April 15	San Jose	2–9	Edmonton		Cooley	18,347	19–53–9	47	Recap
82	April 18	San Jose	1–5	Calgary		Cooley	17,946	19–54–9	47	Recap

Legend: Win Loss Overtime/shootout loss

== Player statistics ==
=== Skaters ===
Regular season
Player	GP	G	A	Pts	+/−	PIM
Mikael Granlund	69	12	48	60	−23	32
William Eklund	80	16	29	45	−45	30
Fabian Zetterlund	82	24	20	44	−34	33
Tomas Hertl^{‡}	48	15	19	34	−26	22
Anthony Duclair^{‡}	56	16	11	27	−12	28
Filip Zadina	72	13	10	23	−44	18
Mike Hoffman	66	10	13	23	−21	20
Mario Ferraro	78	3	18	21	−38	36
Jan Rutta	69	5	14	19	−21	38
Luke Kunin	77	11	7	18	−30	83
Justin Bailey	59	5	9	14	−15	6
Nico Sturm	63	5	8	13	−25	12
Alexander Barabanov	46	4	9	13	−24	12
Marc-Edouard Vlasic	57	6	6	12	−27	26
Ryan Carpenter	62	5	7	12	−16	6
Calen Addison^{†}	60	1	11	12	−35	66
Thomas Bordeleau	27	6	5	11	−18	18
Henry Thrun	51	3	8	11	−22	16
Klim Kostin^{†}	19	5	5	10	−10	15
Ty Emberson	30	1	9	10	−4	6
Jacob MacDonald	34	7	2	9	−14	23
Kevin Labanc	46	2	7	9	−27	16
Kyle Burroughs	73	2	6	8	−42	71
Nikita Okhotiuk^{‡}	43	1	7	8	−22	44
Givani Smith	36	1	3	4	−13	40
Danil Gushchin	4	1	1	2	−2	0
Collin Graf	7	0	2	2	−4	0
Matt Benning	14	0	2	2	−5	14
Logan Couture	6	0	1	1	0	4
Shakir Mukhamadullin	3	0	1	1	0	4
Nikolai Knyzhov	10	0	1	1	−6	6
Oskar Lindblom	1	0	0	0	−1	0
Scott Sabourin	3	0	0	0	0	9
Jack Thompson^{†}	2	0	0	0	−2	0
Jacob Peterson	6	0	0	0	−3	2
Jack Studnicka^{†}	17	0	0	0	−14	6

=== Goaltenders ===
Regular season
Player	GP	GS	TOI	W	L	OT	GA	GAA	SA	SV%	SO	G	A	PIM
Mackenzie Blackwood	44	41	2,437	10	25	4	140	3.45	1,383	.899	2	0	0	2
Kaapo Kahkonen^{‡}	31	27	1,651	6	20	3	105	3.81	996	.895	0	0	1	4
Devin Cooley	6	6	301	2	3	1	25	4.98	192	.870	0	0	0	0
Magnus Chrona	9	8	471	1	6	1	37	4.71	262	.859	0	0	0	0
Georgi Romanov	2	0	59	0	0	0	1	1.01	30	.967	0	0	0	0

^{†}Denotes player spent time with another team before joining the Sharks. Stats reflect time with the Sharks only.
^{‡}Denotes player was traded mid-season. Stats reflect time with the Sharks only.

== Transactions ==
The Sharks have been involved in the following transactions during the 2023–24 season.

=== Key ===
† Contract is entry-level.
‡ Contract initially takes effect in the 2024–25 season.

=== Trades ===
Date	Details		Ref
June 29, 2023	To Carolina Hurricanes CAR 3rd-round pick in 2023; 4th-round pick in 2023	To San Jose Sharks PHI 3rd-round pick in 2023	
June 29, 2023	To Washington Capitals 7th-round pick in 2023	To San Jose Sharks 7th-round pick in 2025	
July 1, 2023	To Florida Panthers Steven Lorentz; 5th-round pick in 2025	To San Jose Sharks Anthony Duclair	
July 2, 2023	To Winnipeg Jets Artemi Kniazev	To San Jose Sharks Leon Gawanke	
August 6, 2023	To Pittsburgh Penguins Dillon Hamaliuk; Erik Karlsson*; 3rd-round pick in 2026	To San Jose Sharks Mikael Granlund; Mike Hoffman; Jan Rutta conditional 1st-round pick in 2024 or 1st-round pick in 2025	
November 8, 2023	To Minnesota Wild Adam Raska; 5th-round pick in 2026	To San Jose Sharks Calen Addison	
December 15, 2023	To Vancouver Canucks Nick Cicek; 6th-round pick in 2024	To San Jose Sharks Jack Studnicka	
March 8, 2024	To Tampa Bay Lightning Anthony Duclair	To San Jose Sharks Jack Thompson; 3rd-round pick in 2024	
March 8, 2024	To Detroit Red Wings Radim Simek; 7th-round pick in 2024	To San Jose Sharks Klim Kostin	
March 8, 2024	To Calgary Flames Nikita Okhotiuk	To San Jose Sharks 5th-round pick in 2024	
March 8, 2024	To Buffalo Sabres 7th-round pick in 2024	To San Jose Sharks Devin Cooley	
March 8, 2024	To New Jersey Devils Kaapo Kahkonen	To San Jose Sharks Vítek Vanecek; 7th-round pick in 2025	
March 8, 2024	To Vegas Golden Knights Tomas Hertl (17% retained); 3rd-round pick in 2025; 3rd-round pick in 2027	To San Jose Sharks David Edstrom; 1st-round pick in 2025	
June 19, 2024	To Dallas Stars 4th-round pick in 2025	To San Jose Sharks Ty Dellandrea	
June 23, 2024	To Nashville Predators Ozzy Wiesblatt	To San Jose Sharks Egor Afanasyev	
June 25, 2024	To Detroit Red Wings Future considerations	To San Jose Sharks Jake Walman; TBL 2nd-round pick in 2024	
June 27, 2024	To Buffalo Sabres 1st-round pick in 2024; 2nd-round pick in 2024	To San Jose Sharks 1st-round pick in 2024	
June 27, 2024	To Los Angeles Kings Kyle Burroughs	To San Jose Sharks Carl Grundstrom	

=== Players acquired ===
Date	Player	Former team	Term	Via	Ref
July 1, 2023	Kyle Burroughs	Vancouver Canucks	3-year	Free agency	
July 1, 2023	Ryan Carpenter	New York Rangers	1-year	Free agency	
July 1, 2023	Scott Sabourin	Ottawa Senators	2-year	Free agency	
July 1, 2023	Givani Smith	Florida Panthers	2-year	Free agency	
July 3, 2023	Nathan Todd	Springfield Thunderbirds (AHL)	2-year	Free agency	
July 10, 2023	Filip Zadina	Detroit Red Wings	1-year	Free agency	
September 30, 2023	Ty Emberson	New York Rangers		Waivers	
November 27, 2023	Justin Bailey	Edmonton Oilers	1-year	Free agency	
June 19, 2024	Barclay Goodrow	New York Rangers		Waivers	

=== Players lost ===
Date	Player	New team	Term	Via	Ref
July 1, 2023	Kyle Criscuolo	New Jersey Devils	1-year	Free agency	
July 1, 2023	James Reimer	Detroit Red Wings	1-year	Free agency	
July 1, 2023	Jeffrey Viel	Winnipeg Jets	1-year	Free agency	
July 2, 2023	Jonah Gadjovich	Charlotte Checkers (AHL)	1-year	Free agency	
July 3, 2023	Strauss Mann	Laval Rocket (AHL)	1-year	Free agency	
July 4, 2023	Derrick Pouliot	Dallas Stars	1-year	Free agency	
July 6, 2023	Martin Kaut	HC Dynamo Pardubice (ELH)	2-year	Free agency	
July 7, 2023	Andreas Johnsson	Pittsburgh Penguins	1-year	Free agency	
July 10, 2023	Andrej Sustr	Kölner Haie (DEL)	1-year	Free agency	
July 10, 2023	C. J. Suess	Manitoba Moose (AHL)	2-year	Free agency	
August 11, 2023	Evgeny Svechnikov	Ak Bars Kazan (KHL)	2-year	Free agency	
October 10, 2023	Noah Gregor	Toronto Maple Leafs	1-year	Free agency	
February 8, 2024	Leon Gawanke			Contract termination	
May 8, 2024	Noah Gregor	Brynäs IF (SHL)	2-year	Free agency	

=== Signings ===
Date	Player	Term	Ref
June 30, 2023	Eetu Makiniemi	1-year	
June 30, 2023	Jacob Peterson	1-year	
July 1, 2023	Mackenzie Blackwood	2-year	
July 1, 2023	Fabian Zetterlund	2-year	
July 5, 2023	Leon Gawanke	1-year	
July 12, 2023	Kasper Halttunen	3-year†	
October 4, 2023	Quentin Musty	3-year†	
October 5, 2023	Jake Furlong	3-year†	
April 4, 2024	Collin Graf	3-year	
May 22, 2024	Luca Cagnoni	3-year†	
May 28, 2024	Will Smith	3-year†	

== Draft picks ==
Below are the San Jose Sharks' selections at the 2023 NHL entry draft, which was held on June 28 and 29, 2023, in Nashville, Tennessee, United States.

Round	#	Player	Pos	Nationality	College/Junior/Club (League)
1	4	Will Smith	C	United States	U.S. NTDP (USHL)
1	26 (Note: The New Jersey Devils first-round pick will go to the San Jose Sharks as a result of the trade on February 26, 2023, that sent Timo Meier, Timur Ibragimov, Scott Harrington, Santeri Hatakka, Zachary Emond and Colorado's fifth-round pick in 2024 to New Jersey in exchange for Shakir Mukhamadullin, Nikita Okhotiuk, Andreas Johnsson, Fabian Zetterlund, a conditional second-round pick in 2024, a seventh-round pick in 2024 and this pick (being conditional at the time of the trade). The condition – San Jose will receive a first-round pick in 2023 if New Jersey's first-round pick in 2023 is outside of the top two selections – was converted when the Devils qualified for the 2023 Stanley Cup playoffs on March 25, 2023.)	Quentin Musty	LW	United States	Sudbury Wolves (OHL)
2	36	Kasper Halttunen	RW	Finland	HIFK (Liiga)
3	71 (Note: The Sharks traded their 94th and 100th selection to the Carolina Hurricanes in exchange for the 71st pick.)	Brandon Svoboda	C	United States	Youngstown Phantoms (USHL)
4	123 (Note: The Colorado Avalanche's fourth-round pick will go to the San Jose Sharks as the result of a trade on February 5, 2023, that sent Jaycob Megna to Seattle in exchange for this pick (being conditional at the time of the trade. The condition – San Jose will receive either the Avalanche's or Kraken's fourth-round pick in 2023, at Seattle’s choice – the date of conversion is unknown.)	Luca Cagnoni	D	Canada	Portland Winterhawks (WHL)
5	130 (Note: The Columbus Blue Jackets' fifth-round pick will go to the San Jose Sharks as the result of a trade on July 8, 2022, that sent Buffalo's fifth-round pick in 2022 to Columbus in exchange for this pick.)	Axel Landen	D	Sweden	HV71 (J20 Nationell)
5	132	Eric Pohlkamp	D	United States	Cedar Rapids RoughRiders (USHL)
7	196	David Klee	C	United States	Waterloo Black Hawks (USHL)
7	203 (Note: The Vancouver Canucks' seventh-round pick will go to the San Jose Sharks as the result of a trade on July 8, 2022, that sent a seventh-round pick in 2022 to Arizona in exchange for this pick.)	Yegor Rimashevskiy	RW	Belarus	MHC Dynamo Moscow (MHL)

== Awards ==
Regular season
Player	Award	Awarded
Tomas Hertl	Second star of the week All-Star	December 11, 2023; January 4, 2024
