= 2023–24 Florida Panthers season =

National Hockey League season

2023–24 Florida Panthers
- Stanley Cup champions
- Eastern Conference champions
- Atlantic Division champions
- Division: 1st Atlantic
- Conference: 3rd Eastern
- 2023–24 record: 52–24–6
- Home record: 26–13–2
- Road record: 26–11–4
- Goals for: 268
- Goals against: 200

Team information
- General manager: Bill Zito
- Coach: Paul Maurice
- Captain: Aleksander Barkov
- Alternate captains: Aaron Ekblad; Matthew Tkachuk
- Arena: Amerant Bank Arena
- Average attendance: 18,640
- Minor league affiliates: Charlotte Checkers (AHL); Florida Everblades (ECHL)

Team leaders
- Goals: Sam Reinhart (57)
- Assists: Matthew Tkachuk (62)
- Points: Sam Reinhart (94)
- Penalty minutes: Jonah Gadjovich (104)
- Plus/minus: Gustav Forsling (+56)
- Wins: Sergei Bobrovsky (36)
- Goals against average: Anthony Stolarz (2.03)

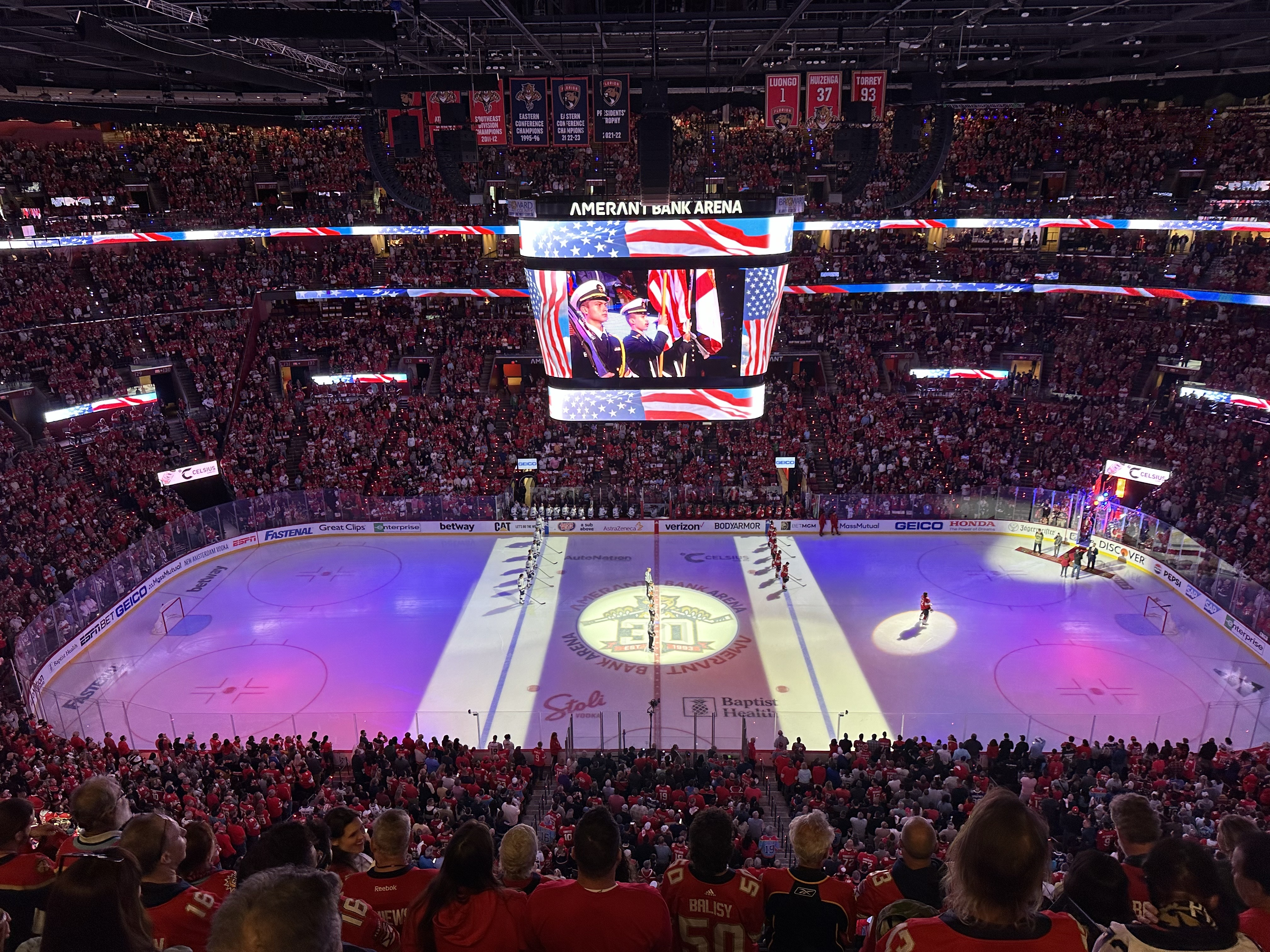
Amerant Bank Arena before the Panthers' game 2 win against the Tampa Bay Lightning in the first round of the Stanley Cup playoffs.

The 2023–24 Florida Panthers season was the 30th season for the National Hockey League (NHL) franchise that was established in 1993. They entered the season as the defending Eastern Conference champions, having lost in five games to the Vegas Golden Knights in the 2023 Stanley Cup Final.

On March 28, 2024, the Panthers clinched a playoff berth for the fifth straight season following the Detroit Red Wings' 4–0 loss against the Carolina Hurricanes. On April 16, the Panthers clinched their third Atlantic Division title and fourth all-time division title following a win against the Toronto Maple Leafs in their final game of the year alongside a Boston Bruins loss to the Ottawa Senators.

The Panthers averaged 18,632 fans in attendance this season. This mark is the highest average attendance in team history.

The Panthers met the Tampa Bay Lightning in the first round of the 2024 Stanley Cup playoffs. The Panthers and Lightning previously met in the playoffs twice, with Tampa Bay winning both series. The Panthers eliminated the Lightning in five games. They faced the Boston Bruins in the second round, winning the series in six games. The Panthers defeated the New York Rangers in the conference finals in six games, advancing to the Stanley Cup Final for the second consecutive season.

In the 2024 Stanley Cup Final series matchup against the Edmonton Oilers, the Panthers initially held a 3–0 lead before experiencing defeats in the following three games. The Panthers defeated the Oilers 2–1 in Game 7 at home, averting a possible reverse sweep, which would have made Florida the first team to suffer this fate since Detroit in the 1942 Stanley Cup Final. This victory clinched the franchise's first Stanley Cup championship in its 30 years of existence.

== Previous season ==
After barely clinching a wild card spot in the 2023 Stanley Cup playoffs, the Panthers were set to face the Boston Bruins, who had set an NHL record for most wins and points in a season. After being down 3–1 in the series, the Panthers came back and won the series in overtime in game 7 to pull off one of the biggest upsets in NHL history. The Panthers would then upset the Toronto Maple Leafs to advance to the Eastern Conference finals for the first time in 27 years. Subsequently, the Panthers would sweep the Carolina Hurricanes to advance to the Stanley Cup Final for the first time since 1996. In the Stanley Cup Final, the Panthers were defeated by the Vegas Golden Knights in five games. Coupled with the Miami Heat's defeat one night earlier in the NBA Finals against the Denver Nuggets (which was also decided in five games), South Florida had two teams lose their respective sport's finals on consecutive days.

== 30th anniversary celebrations ==
In July 2023, the Florida Panthers announced celebrations for their 30th Anniversary season including the unveiling of the club's 30th Anniversary logo. The Panthers celebrated thirty years of Panthers hockey with a theme night honoring each decade. On January 11 as the Panthers hosted the Los Angeles Kings, fans celebrated the birth of the franchise in the 1990s. On March 7 versus the Philadelphia Flyers, the 2000s were spotlighted and on March 28 versus the New York Islanders, game presentation and in-game themes highlighted the 2010s into the current era.

== Standings ==
=== Divisional standings ===
Atlantic Division
Pos	Team	GP	W	L	OTL	RW	GF	GA	GD	Pts
1	y – Florida Panthers	82	52	24	6	42	268	200	+68	110
2	x – Boston Bruins	82	47	20	15	36	267	224	+43	109
3	x – Toronto Maple Leafs	82	46	26	10	33	303	263	+40	102
4	x – Tampa Bay Lightning	82	45	29	8	37	291	268	+23	98
5	Detroit Red Wings	82	41	32	9	27	278	274	+4	91
6	Buffalo Sabres	82	39	37	6	33	246	244	+2	84
7	Ottawa Senators	82	37	41	4	25	255	281	−26	78
8	Montreal Canadiens	82	30	36	16	20	236	289	−53	76

Source: National Hockey League
Rules for classification: 1) Fewer number of games played (GP, only during regular season); 2) Greater number of regulation wins (RW); 3) Greater number of wins in regulation and overtime, excluding shootout wins (ROW); 4) Greater number of total wins, including shootouts (W); 5) Greater number of points earned in head-to-head play; if teams played an uneven number of head-to-head games, the result of the first game on the home ice of the team with the extra home game is discarded; 6) Greater goal differential (GD); 7) Greater number of goals scored (GF)
x – Clinched playoff spot; y – Clinched division

=== Conference standings ===
Eastern Conference Wild Card
Pos	Div	Team	GP	W	L	OTL	RW	GF	GA	GD	Pts
1	AT	x – Tampa Bay Lightning	82	45	29	8	37	291	268	+23	98
2	ME	x – Washington Capitals	82	40	31	11	32	220	257	−37	91
3	AT	Detroit Red Wings	82	41	32	9	27	278	274	+4	91
4	ME	Pittsburgh Penguins	82	38	32	12	32	255	251	+4	88
5	ME	Philadelphia Flyers	82	38	33	11	30	235	261	−26	87
6	AT	Buffalo Sabres	82	39	37	6	33	246	244	+2	84
7	ME	New Jersey Devils	82	38	39	5	33	264	283	−19	81
8	AT	Ottawa Senators	82	37	41	4	25	255	281	−26	78
9	AT	Montreal Canadiens	82	30	36	16	20	236	289	−53	76
10	ME	Columbus Blue Jackets	82	27	43	12	21	237	300	−63	66

Source: National Hockey League
Rules for classification: 1) Fewer number of games played (GP, only during regular season); 2) Greater number of regulation wins (RW); 3) Greater number of wins in regulation and overtime, excluding shootout wins (ROW); 4) Greater number of total wins, including shootouts (W); 5) Greater number of points earned in head-to-head play; if teams played an uneven number of head-to-head games, the result of the first game on the home ice of the team with the extra home game is discarded; 6) Greater goal differential (GD); 7) Greater number of goals scored (GF)
x – Clinched playoff spot

== Schedule and results ==
=== Preseason ===
The preseason schedule was published on June 23, 2023.

2023 preseason game log: 4–4–0 (Home: 3–1–0; Road: 1–3–0)
#	Date	Visitor	Score	Home	OT	Decision	Attendance	Record	Recap
1	September 25	Nashville	0–5	Florida		Knight	6,160	1–0–0
2	September 25	Nashville	2–5	Florida		Bobrovsky	6,365	2–0–0
3	September 27	Florida	1–4	Carolina		Knight	15,368	2–1–0
4	September 29	Carolina	2–4	Florida		Stolarz	8,869	3–1–0
5	October 1	Florida	2–4	Ottawa		Knight	4,926	3–2–0
6	October 3	Florida	0–2	Tampa Bay		Bobrovsky	16,802	3–3–0
7	October 5	Florida	6–3	Tampa Bay		Stolarz	12,924	4–3–0
8	October 7	Tampa Bay	4–2	Florida		Bobrovsky	13,780	4–4–0
Notes:^{A} Indicates split-squad.

=== Regular season ===
The regular season schedule was published on June 27, 2023.

2023–24 game log

October: 4–3–1 (Home: 3–1–0; Road: 1–2–1)
#	Date	Visitor	Score	Home	OT	Decision	Attendance	Record	Pts	Recap
1	October 12	Florida	0–2	Minnesota		Bobrovsky	18,976	0–1–0	0
2	October 14	Florida	4–6	Winnipeg		Bobrovsky	13,410	0–2–0	0
3	October 16	Florida	4–3	New Jersey		Bobrovsky	15,023	1–2–0	2
4	October 19	Toronto	1–3	Florida		Bobrovsky	19,288	2–2–0	4
5	October 21	Vancouver	5–3	Florida		Bobrovsky	16,991	2–3–0	4
6	October 24	San Jose	1–3	Florida		Stolarz	16,142	3–3–0	6
7	October 28	Seattle	2–3	Florida		Bobrovsky	16,780	4–3–0	8
8	October 30	Florida	2–3	Boston	OT	Bobrovsky	17,850	4–3–1	9

November: 10–4–1 (Home: 4–2–0; Road: 6–2–1)
#	Date	Visitor	Score	Home	OT	Decision	Attendance	Record	Pts	Recap
9	November 2	Florida	2–0	Detroit		Bobrovsky	17,233	5–3–1	11
10	November 4	Florida	2–5	Chicago		Stolarz	18,666	5–4–1	11
11	November 6	Columbus	4–5	Florida	OT	Bobrovsky	17,103	6–4–1	13
12	November 8	Florida	4–3	Washington	OT	Bobrovsky	16,104	7–4–1	15
13	November 10	Carolina	2–5	Florida		Bobrovsky	17,845	8–4–1	17
14	November 12	Chicago	3–4	Florida		Bobrovsky	19,359	9–4–1	19
15	November 14	Florida	5–3	San Jose		Stolarz	10,108	10–4–1	21
16	November 16	Florida	1–2	Los Angeles		Bobrovsky	17,243	10–5–1	21
17	November 17	Florida	2–1	Anaheim		Stolarz	14,932	11–5–1	23
18	November 20	Edmonton	3–5	Florida		Bobrovsky	19,628	12–5–1	25
19	November 22	Boston	3–1	Florida		Bobrovsky	19,327	12–6–1	25
20	November 24	Winnipeg	3–0	Florida		Bobrovsky	18,801	12–7–1	25
21	November 27	Florida	5–0	Ottawa		Bobrovsky	15,594	13–7–1	27
22	November 28	Florida	1–2	Toronto	SO	Stolarz	18,508	13–7–2	28
23	November 30	Florida	5–1	Montreal		Bobrovsky	21,105	14–7–2	30

December: 8–5–0 (Home: 5–2–0; Road: 3–3–0)
#	Date	Visitor	Score	Home	OT	Decision	Attendance	Record	Pts	Recap
24	December 2	NY Islanders	4–3	Florida		Stolarz	18,721	14–8–2	30
25	December 6	Dallas	4–5	Florida		Bobrovsky	18,376	15–8–2	32
26	December 8	Pittsburgh	1–3	Florida		Bobrovsky	18,640	16–8–2	34
27	December 10	Florida	5–2	Columbus		Stolarz	16,269	17–8–2	36
28	December 12	Florida	0–4	Seattle		Bobrovsky	17,151	17–9–2	36
29	December 14	Florida	0–4	Vancouver		Bobrovsky	18,873	17–10–2	36
30	December 16	Florida	5–1	Edmonton		Bobrovsky	18,347	18–10–2	38
31	December 18	Florida	1–3	Calgary		Stolarz	16,813	18–11–2	38
32	December 21	St. Louis	4–1	Florida		Bobrovsky	18,753	18–12–2	38
33	December 23	Vegas	2–4	Florida		Bobrovsky	19,364	19–12–2	40
34	December 27	Florida	3–2	Tampa Bay		Bobrovsky	19,092	20–12–2	42
35	December 29	NY Rangers	3–4	Florida		Bobrovsky	19,723	21–12–2	44
36	December 30	Montreal	1–4	Florida		Stolarz	19,663	22–12–2	46

January: 9–2–2 (Home: 2–2–2; Road: 7–0–0)
#	Date	Visitor	Score	Home	OT	Decision	Attendance	Record	Pts	Recap
37	January 2	Florida	4–1	Arizona		Bobrovsky	4,600	23–12–2	48
38	January 4	Florida	4–1	Vegas		Bobrovsky	18,044	24–12–2	50
39	January 6	Florida	8–4	Colorado		Bobrovsky	18,132	25–12–2	52
40	January 9	Florida	5–1	St. Louis		Stolarz	18,096	26–12–2	54
41	January 11	Los Angeles	2–3	Florida	OT	Bobrovsky	18,616	27–12–2	56
42	January 13	New Jersey	4–1	Florida		Bobrovsky	19,526	27–13–2	56
43	January 15	Anaheim	5–4	Florida	OT	Stolarz	17,885	27–13–3	57
44	January 17	Detroit	3–2	Florida	OT	Bobrovsky	17,958	27–13–4	58
45	January 19	Minnesota	6–4	Florida		Stolarz	19,595	27–14–4	58
46	January 22	Florida	4–1	Nashville		Stolarz	17,159	28–14–4	60
47	January 24	Arizona	2–6	Florida		Bobrovsky	17,020	29–14–4	62
48	January 26	Florida	3–2	Pittsburgh	SO	Bobrovsky	18,188	30–14–4	64
49	January 27	Florida	3–2	NY Islanders	OT	Stolarz	17,255	31–14–4	66

February: 9–2–0 (Home: 6–1–0; Road: 3–1–0)
#	Date	Visitor	Score	Home	OT	Decision	Attendance	Record	Pts	Recap
50	February 6	Philadelphia	2–1	Florida		Stolarz	17,340	31–15–4	66
51	February 8	Washington	2–4	Florida		Bobrovsky	17,645	32–15–4	68
52	February 10	Colorado	0–4	Florida		Bobrovsky	19,304	33–15–4	70
53	February 14	Florida	5–2	Pittsburgh		Bobrovsky	17,967	34–15–4	72
54	February 15	Florida	4–0	Buffalo		Stolarz	14,277	35–15–4	74
55	February 17	Florida	9–2	Tampa Bay		Bobrovsky	19,092	36–15–4	76
56	February 20	Ottawa	2–3	Florida	OT	Bobrovsky	19,000	37–15–4	78
57	February 22	Florida	0–1	Carolina		Bobrovsky	18,700	37–16–4	78
58	February 24	Washington	2–3	Florida	OT	Bobrovsky	19,887	38–16–4	80
59	February 27	Buffalo	2–3	Florida		Bobrovsky	18,243	39–16–4	82
60	February 29	Montreal	3–4	Florida	SO	Stolarz	18,918	40–16–4	84

March: 7–6–1 (Home: 2–5–0; Road: 5–1–1)
#	Date	Visitor	Score	Home	OT	Decision	Attendance	Record	Pts	Recap
61	March 2	Florida	4–0	Detroit		Bobrovsky	19,515	41–16–4	86
62	March 4	Florida	4–2	NY Rangers		Bobrovsky	18,006	42–16–4	88
63	March 5	Florida	5–3	New Jersey		Stolarz	16,042	43–16–4	90
64	March 7	Philadelphia	2–1	Florida		Bobrovsky	18,817	43–17–4	90
65	March 9	Calgary	1–5	Florida		Stolarz	19,358	44–17–4	92
66	March 12	Florida	4–3	Dallas		Bobrovsky	18,532	45–17–4	94
67	March 14	Florida	0–4	Carolina		Bobrovsky	18,700	45–18–4	94
68	March 16	Tampa Bay	5–3	Florida		Bobrovsky	19,396	45–19–4	94
69	March 21	Nashville	3–0	Florida		Bobrovsky	19,780	45–20–4	94
70	March 23	Florida	3–4	NY Rangers	SO	Bobrovsky	18,006	45–20–5	95
71	March 24	Florida	4–1	Philadelphia		Stolarz	18,712	46–20–5	97
72	March 26	Boston	4–3	Florida		Bobrovsky	18,689	46–21–5	97
73	March 28	NY Islanders	3–2	Florida		Stolarz	19,201	46–22–5	97
74	March 30	Detroit	2–3	Florida	SO	Bobrovsky	19,290	47–22–5	99

April: 5–2–1 (Home: 4–0–0; Road: 1–2–1)
#	Date	Visitor	Score	Home	OT	Decision	Attendance	Record	Pts	Recap
75	April 1	Florida	4–6	Toronto		Bobrovsky	18,776	47–23–5	99
76	April 2	Florida	3–5	Montreal		Stolarz	21,105	47–24–5	99
77	April 4	Florida	6–0	Ottawa		Bobrovsky	17,653	48–24–5	101
78	April 6	Florida	2–3	Boston	OT	Bobrovsky	17,850	48–24–6	102
79	April 9	Ottawa	0–2	Florida		Stolarz	17,872	49–24–6	104
80	April 11	Columbus	0–4	Florida		Bobrovsky	18,451	50–24–6	106
81	April 13	Buffalo	2–3	Florida	OT	Bobrovsky	19,319	51–24–6	108
82	April 16	Toronto	2–5	Florida		Stolarz	18,317	52–24–6	110

Legend: Win (2 points) Loss (0 points) Overtime/shootout loss (1 point)

=== Playoffs ===
2024 Stanley Cup playoffs

Eastern Conference first round vs. (WC1) Tampa Bay Lightning: Florida won 4–1
#	Date	Visitor	Score	Home	OT	Decision	Attendance	Series	Recap
1	April 21	Tampa Bay	2–3	Florida		Bobrovsky	19,356	1–0
2	April 23	Tampa Bay	2–3	Florida	OT	Bobrovsky	19,484	2–0
3	April 25	Florida	5–3	Tampa Bay		Bobrovsky	19,092	3–0
4	April 27	Florida	3–6	Tampa Bay		Bobrovsky	19,092	3–1
5	April 29	Tampa Bay	1–6	Florida		Bobrovsky	19,750	4–1

Eastern Conference second round vs. (A2) Boston Bruins: Florida won 4–2
#	Date	Visitor	Score	Home	OT	Decision	Attendance	Series	Recap
1	May 6	Boston	5–1	Florida		Bobrovsky	19,275	0–1
2	May 8	Boston	1–6	Florida		Bobrovsky	19,789	1–1
3	May 10	Florida	6–2	Boston		Bobrovsky	17,850	2–1
4	May 12	Florida	3–2	Boston		Bobrovsky	17,850	3–1
5	May 14	Boston	2–1	Florida		Bobrovsky	20,004	3–2
6	May 17	Florida	2–1	Boston		Bobrovsky	17,850	4–2

Eastern Conference final vs. (M1) New York Rangers: Florida won 4–2
#	Date	Visitor	Score	Home	OT	Decision	Attendance	Series	Recap
1	May 22	Florida	3–0	NY Rangers		Bobrovsky	18,006	1–0
2	May 24	Florida	1–2	NY Rangers	OT	Bobrovsky	18,006	1–1
3	May 26	NY Rangers	5–4	Florida	OT	Bobrovsky	19,780	1–2
4	May 28	NY Rangers	2–3	Florida	OT	Bobrovsky	19,754	2–2
5	May 30	Florida	3–2	NY Rangers		Bobrovsky	18,006	3–2
6	June 1	NY Rangers	1–2	Florida		Bobrovsky	19,865	4–2

Stanley Cup Final vs. (P2) Edmonton Oilers: Florida won 4–3
#	Date	Visitor	Score	Home	OT	Decision	Attendance	Series	Recap
1	June 8	Edmonton	0–3	Florida		Bobrovsky	19,543	1–0
2	June 10	Edmonton	1–4	Florida		Bobrovsky	19,673	2–0
3	June 13	Florida	4–3	Edmonton		Bobrovsky	18,347	3–0
4	June 15	Florida	1–8	Edmonton		Stolarz	18,347	3–1
5	June 18	Edmonton	5–3	Florida		Bobrovsky	19,956	3–2
6	June 21	Florida	1–5	Edmonton		Bobrovsky	18,347	3–3
7	June 24	Edmonton	1–2	Florida		Bobrovsky	19,939	4–3

Legend: Win Loss

== Player statistics ==
=== Skaters ===
Regular season
Player	GP	G	A	Pts	+/−	PIM
Sam Reinhart	82	57	37	94	+29	31
Matthew Tkachuk	80	26	62	88	+19	88
Aleksander Barkov	73	23	57	80	+33	24
Carter Verhaeghe	76	34	38	72	+17	36
Sam Bennett	69	20	21	41	+17	100
Evan Rodrigues	80	12	27	39	+26	34
Gustav Forsling	79	10	29	39	+56	43
Anton Lundell	78	13	22	35	+19	46
Brandon Montour	66	8	25	33	+1	46
Oliver Ekman-Larsson	80	9	23	32	+10	76
Eetu Luostarinen	82	12	15	27	+1	26
Dmitry Kulikov	76	1	19	20	+15	63
Aaron Ekblad	51	4	14	18	+27	50
Niko Mikkola	82	3	14	17	+11	69
Kevin Stenlund	81	11	4	15	−10	62
Nick Cousins	69	7	8	15	+1	64
Vladimir Tarasenko^{†}	19	6	8	14	0	0
Josh Mahura	30	0	9	9	−2	20
Ryan Lomberg	75	5	2	7	−1	80
Jonah Gadjovich	39	2	2	4	0	104
Uvis Balinskis	26	1	2	3	0	8
Steven Lorentz	38	1	2	3	−9	10
Will Lockwood	26	0	1	1	+2	16
Mackie Samoskevich	7	0	0	0	−3	0
Mike Reilly^{‡}	2	0	0	0	−2	2
Tobias Bjornfot^{†}	3	0	0	0	0	0
Justin Sourdif^{†}	3	0	0	0	0	0
Kyle Okposo^{†}	6	0	0	0	0	2

Playoffs
Player	GP	G	A	Pts	+/−	PIM
Aleksander Barkov	24	8	14	22	−1	8
Matthew Tkachuk	24	6	16	22	0	31
Carter Verhaeghe	24	11	10	21	−5	20
Anton Lundell	24	3	14	17	+8	12
Sam Reinhart	24	10	6	16	−2	12
Evan Rodrigues	24	7	8	15	+6	4
Sam Bennett	19	7	7	14	−1	12
Gustav Forsling	24	4	9	13	+9	12
Brandon Montour	24	3	8	11	0	12
Vladimir Tarasenko	24	5	4	9	+4	2
Eetu Luostarinen	24	2	6	8	+2	22
Oliver Ekman-Larsson	24	2	4	6	+1	24
Aaron Ekblad	24	1	5	6	+4	16
Niko Mikkola	24	2	2	4	+4	22
Steven Lorentz	16	2	1	3	−1	0
Dmitry Kulikov	24	0	2	2	−1	16
Kyle Okposo	17	0	2	2	−1	10
Kevin Stenlund	24	0	1	1	−3	8
Nick Cousins	12	0	1	1	−1	20
Ryan Lomberg	8	0	0	0	−2	10

=== Goaltenders ===
Regular season
Player	GP	GS	TOI	W	L	OT	GA	GAA	SA	SV%	SO	G	A	PIM
Sergei Bobrovsky	58	58	3,414:14	36	17	4	135	2.37	1,584	.915	6	0	2	4
Anthony Stolarz	27	24	1,506:27	16	7	2	51	2.03	684	.925	2	0	2	2

Playoffs
Player	GP	GS	TOI	W	L	GA	GAA	SA	SV%	SO	G	A	PIM
Sergei Bobrovsky	24	24	1,419:32	16	8	55	2.32	583	.906	2	0	1	0
Anthony Stolarz	1	0	34:50	0	0	3	5.17	19	.842	0	0	0	0

- ^{†}Denotes player spent time with another team before joining the Panthers. Stats reflect time with the Panthers only.
- ^{‡}Denotes player was traded mid-season. Stats reflect time with the Panthers only.
- Bold/italics denotes franchise record.

== Awards and honors ==
=== Awards ===
Aleksander Barkov won the Frank J. Selke Trophy as the forward who demonstrates the most skill in the defensive component of the game. This is Barkov's second career Selke win.

=== Milestones ===
Sam Reinhart became the second Florida Panthers player in history with a 50-goal season.

== Transactions ==
The Panthers have been involved in the following transactions during the 2023–24 season.

Key:

† Contract is entry-level.
‡ Contract initially takes effect in the 2024–25 season.

=== Trades ===
Date	Details		Ref
June 29, 2023	To San Jose Sharks Anthony Duclair	To Florida Panthers Steven Lorentz; 5th-round pick in 2025	
March 6, 2024	To Ottawa Senators Conditional 4th-round pick in 2024; 3rd-round pick in 2025	To Florida Panthers Vladimir Tarasenko	
March 8, 2024	To Pittsburgh Penguins Ludovic Waeber; Conditional 7th-round pick in 2025	To Florida Panthers Magnus Hellberg	
March 8, 2024	To Buffalo Sabres Calle Sjalin; Conditional 7th-round pick in 2024	To Florida Panthers Kyle Okposo	

=== Players acquired ===
Date	Player	Former team	Term	Via	Ref
July 1, 2023	Oliver Ekman-Larsson	Vancouver Canucks	1-year	Free agency	
July 1, 2023	Dmitry Kulikov	Minnesota Wild	1-year	Free agency	
July 1, 2023	Niko Mikkola	New York Rangers	3-year	Free agency	
July 1, 2023	Mike Reilly	Boston Bruins	1-year	Free agency	
July 1, 2023	Kevin Stenlund	Winnipeg Jets	1-year	Free agency	
July 1, 2023	Anthony Stolarz	Anaheim Ducks	1-year	Free agency	
July 2, 2023	Will Lockwood	New York Rangers	1-year	Free agency	
July 2, 2023	Evan Rodrigues	Colorado Avalanche	4-year	Free agency	
July 2, 2023	Alexander True	Seattle Kraken	1-year	Free agency	
July 5, 2023	Rasmus Asplund	Nashville Predators	1-year	Free agency	
October 16, 2023	Jonah Gadjovich	San Jose Sharks	1-year	Free agency	
March 8, 2024	Tobias Bjornfot	Vegas Golden Knights		Waivers	

=== Players lost ===
Date	Player	New team	Term	Via	Ref
July 1, 2023	Evan Fitzpatrick	Syracuse Crunch (AHL)	1-year	Free agency	
July 1, 2023	Radko Gudas	Anaheim Ducks	3-year	Free agency	
July 1, 2023	Alex Lyon	Detroit Red Wings	2-year	Free agency	
July 1, 2023	Givani Smith	San Jose Sharks	2-year	Free agency	
July 3, 2023	Marc Staal	Philadelphia Flyers	1-year	Free agency	
July 21, 2023	Aleksi Heponiemi	EHC Biel-Bienne (NL)	1-year	Free agency	
July 31, 2023	Connor Bunnaman	Oulun Kärpät (Liiga)	1-year	Free agency	
August 3, 2023	Max Gildon	Adler Mannheim (DEL)	1-year	Free agency	
October 9, 2023	John Ludvig	Pittsburgh Penguins		Waivers	
November 25, 2023	Mike Reilly	New York Islanders		Waivers	

=== Extensions ===
Date	Player	Term	Ref
July 1, 2023	Lucas Carlsson	1-year	
July 1, 2023	Grigori Denisenko	2-year	
July 2, 2023	Gerald Mayhew	1-year	
July 25, 2023	Eetu Luostarinen	3-year‡	
December 7, 2023	Josh Davies	3-year†	
January 3, 2024	Uvis Balinskis	2-year‡	
March 7, 2024	Gustav Forsling	8-year‡	

== Draft picks ==
Below are the Florida Panthers' selections at the 2023 NHL entry draft, which was held on June 28–29, 2023, at Bridgestone Arena in Nashville, Tennessee.

Round	#	Player	Pos	Nationality	College/Junior/Club Team (League)
2	63	Gracyn Sawchyn	C	Canada	Seattle Thunderbirds (WHL)
4	127	Albert Wikman	D	Sweden	Färjestad BK (J20 Nationell)
5	159	Olof Glifford	G	Sweden	HV71 (J18 Nationell)
6	191	Luke Coughlin	D	Canada	Rimouski Océanic (QMJHL)
7	198^{3}	Stepan Zvyagin	LW	Russia	Dinamo Minsk (KHL)

=== Notes ===
1. The Florida Panthers' first-round pick will go to the Montreal Canadiens as the result of a trade on March 16, 2022, that sent Ben Chiarot to Florida in exchange for Ty Smilanic, a conditional fourth-round pick in 2022 and this pick (being conditional at the time of the trade). The condition – Montreal will receive a first-round pick in 2023 if Florida's first-round pick in 2022 is outside of the top ten selections – was converted when the Panthers qualified for the 2022 Stanley Cup playoffs on April 3, 2022.
2. The Florida Panthers' third-round pick will go to the San Jose Sharks as the result of a trade on July 13, 2022, that sent Brent Burns and Lane Pederson to Carolina in exchange for Steven Lorentz, Eetu Makiniemi and this pick (being conditional at the time of the trade). The condition – San Jose will receive the lowest of the Flyers', Hurricanes', Rangers' or Panthers' third-round picks in 2023 – was converted when Florida advanced to the 2023 Stanley Cup Final, ensuring that their third-round pick would be the lowest, on May 24, 2023.
3. The Arizona Coyotes' seventh-round pick will go to the Florida Panthers as a result of a trade on July 26, 2021, that sent Anton Stralman, Vladislav Kolyachonok and second-round pick in 2024 to Arizona in exchange for this pick.
4. The Florida Panthers' seventh-round pick will go to the Pittsburgh Penguins as the result of a trade on July 8, 2022, that sent a seventh-round pick in 2022 to Florida in exchange for this pick.
