= Mitchell Chaffee =

American ice hockey player (born 1998)

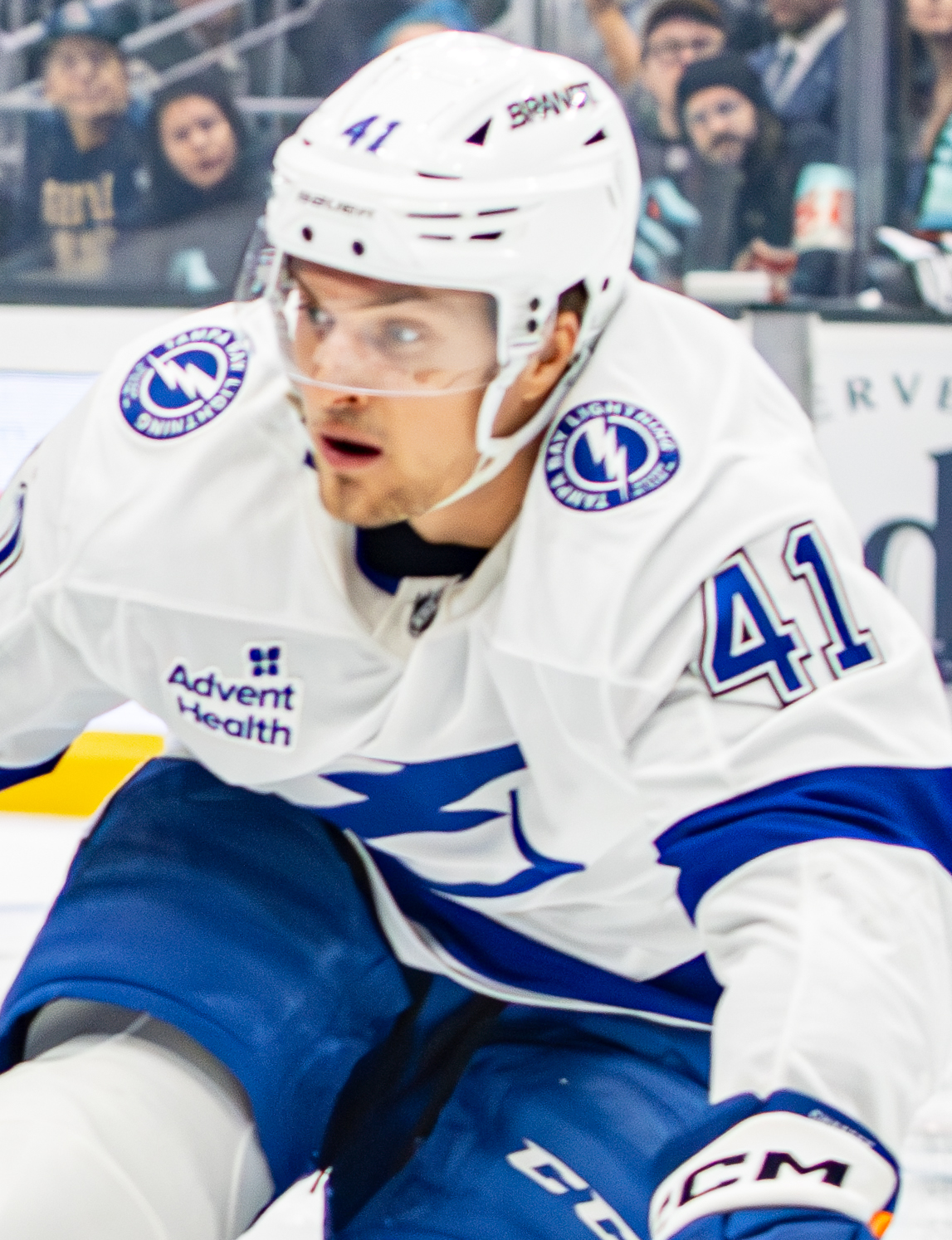
- Chaffee with the Tampa Bay Lightning in 2024
- Born: January 26, 1998 (age 28) Rockford, Michigan, U.S.
- Height: 6 ft 0 in (183 cm)
- Weight: 205 lb (93 kg; 14 st 9 lb)
- Position: Right wing
- Shoots: Right
- NHL team (P) Cur. team Former teams: New York Islanders; Hamilton Hammers (AHL); Minnesota Wild; Tampa Bay Lightning
- NHL draft: Undrafted
- Playing career: 2021–present

Mitchell Alex Chaffee (born January 26, 1998) is an American professional ice hockey player who is a right winger for the Hamilton Hammers of the American Hockey League (AHL) while under contract to the New York Islanders of the National Hockey League (NHL).

== Early life ==
Chaffee was born on January 26, 1998, in Rockford, Michigan, to parents Dave and Kathy Chaffee. He began skating at the age of four and participated in the local "Learn to Skate" and Triple-A programs in the Grand Rapids. Chaffee then played for the Michigan Nationals U18 team before leaving his hometown at the age of 16 to play with the HoneyBaked Hockey Club.

== Playing career ==
While playing with the HoneyBaked Hockey Club during the 2014–15 season, Chaffee recorded 10 goals and 18 assists for 28 points as they qualified for the USA Hockey National Championship game. As a result of his play with the HoneyBaked Hockey Club, Chaffee was selected to play with the Muskegon Lumberjacks of the United States Hockey League (USHL). However, his playing rights were later traded to the Bloomington Thunder in May 2015. He was also drafted by the Sault Ste. Marie Greyhounds in the 11th round of the 2014 Ontario Hockey League Draft.

In his first year with the Thunder, Chaffee recorded seven goals and six assists for 13 points in 54 games. He subsequently committed to play college hockey at the University of Massachusetts Amherst. During his tenure with the Thunder, Chaffee attended Normal Community West High School and played one season of golf.

=== Collegiate ===
Chaffee played college hockey at the University of Massachusetts Amherst. During his sophomore season, he was the Hockey East Scoring Champion and was named to the conference's first All-Star team. He was named as one of the team's co-captains for the 2019–20 season. On March 24, 2020, after his junior season at UMass, Chaffee signed a two-year, entry-level contract with the Minnesota Wild.

=== Professional ===
Following the signing of his contract, Chaffee attended the Wild's 2021 training camp prior to the start of the 2020–21 season. He was subsequently re-assigned to their American Hockey League affiliate, the Iowa Wild, for the remainder of the season.

On April 19, 2022, Chaffee made his NHL debut for the Minnesota Wild and played two games in the NHL during the 2021–22 season. At the conclusion of his entry-level contract with the Wild, Chaffee left the organization as a free agent. On July 1, 2023, he was signed to a one-year, two-way contract with the Tampa Bay Lightning for the 2023–24 season.

Following three seasons within the Lightning organization, Chaffee left as a free agent and was signed to a one-year, $850,000 contract with the New York Islanders for the 2026–27 season on July 1, 2026.

== Career statistics ==
			Regular season					Playoffs
Season	Team	League	GP	G	A	Pts	PIM	GP	G	A	Pts	PIM
2015–16	Bloomington Thunder	USHL	54	7	6	13	40	4	0	0	0	0
2016–17	Bloomington Thunder	USHL	35	7	4	11	34	—	—	—	—	—
2016–17	Fargo Force	USHL	14	1	4	5	4	3	1	0	1	0
2017–18	UMass-Amherst	HE	39	13	11	24	22	—	—	—	—	—
2018–19	UMass-Amherst	HE	40	18	24	42	33	—	—	—	—	—
2019–20	UMass-Amherst	HE	34	16	13	29	16	—	—	—	—	—
2020–21	Iowa Wild	AHL	28	2	15	17	16	—	—	—	—	—
2021–22	Iowa Wild	AHL	49	23	16	39	14	—	—	—	—	—
2021–22	Minnesota Wild	NHL	2	0	0	0	0	—	—	—	—	—
2022–23	Iowa Wild	AHL	10	5	2	7	8	—	—	—	—	—
2023–24	Syracuse Crunch	AHL	36	12	14	26	16	—	—	—	—	—
2023–24	Tampa Bay Lightning	NHL	30	4	3	7	4	5	0	0	0	2
2024–25	Tampa Bay Lightning	NHL	66	12	6	18	21	4	1	0	1	0
2025–26	Tampa Bay Lightning	NHL	11	0	1	1	4	—	—	—	—	—
2025–26	Syracuse Crunch	AHL	54	24	33	57	57	2	1	0	1	0
NHL totals			109	16	10	26	29	9	1	0	1	2

== Awards and honors ==
Award	Year	Ref
College
Hockey East First All-Star Team	2019	
Hockey East Scoring Champion	2019	
NCAA First Team All-American	2019	

Awards and achievements
Preceded by Adam Gaudette	Hockey East Scoring Champion; 2018–19	Succeeded by Jack Dugan
