= Jonas Johansson (ice hockey, born 1995) =

Swedish ice hockey player (born 1995)

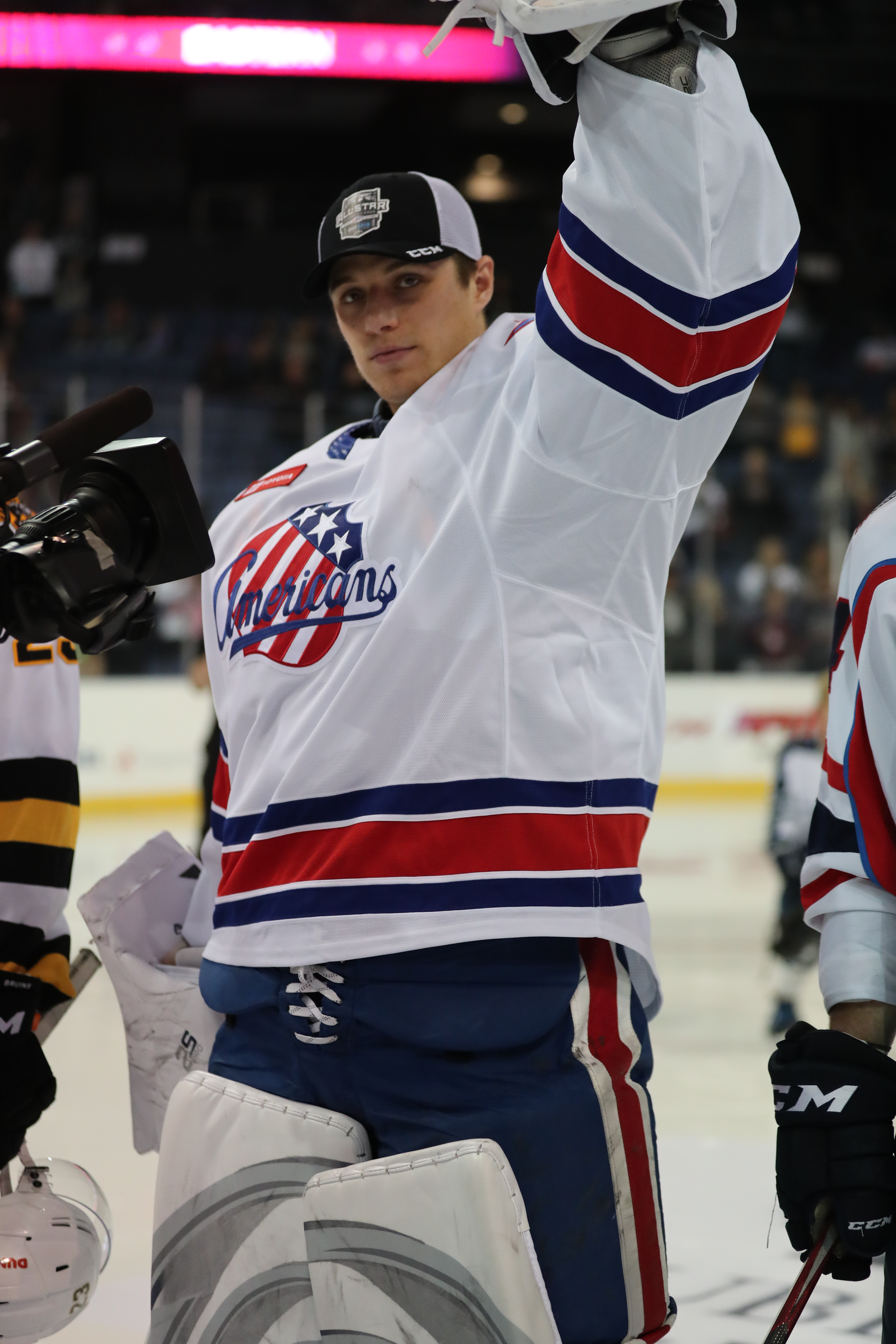
- Johansson with the Rochester Americans in 2020
- Born: 19 September 1995 (age 31) Gävle, Sweden
- Height: 6 ft 5 in (196 cm)
- Weight: 220 lb (100 kg; 15 st 10 lb)
- Position: Goaltender
- Catches: Left
- NHL team (P) Cur. team Former teams: Ottawa Senators; Belleville Senators (AHL); Brynäs IF; Buffalo Sabres; Colorado Avalanche; Florida Panthers; Tampa Bay Lightning
- NHL draft: 61st overall, 2014; Buffalo Sabres
- Playing career: 2014–present

Jonas Olov Johansson (born 19 September 1995) is a Swedish professional ice hockey player who is a goaltender for the Belleville Senators of the American Hockey League while under contract to the Ottawa Senators of the National Hockey League (NHL). Johansson was selected by the Buffalo Sabres in the third round, 61st overall, of the 2014 NHL entry draft. Along with Buffalo, Johansson has previously played with the Colorado Avalanche, Florida Panthers, and Tampa Bay Lightning in the NHL and Brynäs IF of the Swedish Hockey League (SHL).

== Playing career ==
=== Sweden ===
Johansson joined the Brynäs IF organization in the 2010–11 season and worked his way up through the club's junior ranks before making his Swedish Hockey League debut playing with team during the 2013–14 SHL season. He made four appearances in the SHL, recording two wins and two losses (2–2–0) with a goals against average of 2.96 and a save percentage of .914. He spent the majority of the following 2014–15 season in the J20 Nationell league, but got into two games with Brynäs' senior team, going 0–2–0 with a save percentage of .842 and a GAA of 6.20. Not ready yet for SHL play, he was loaned to Almtuna IS playing in Sweden's second tier league, HockeyAllsvenskan, on 27 January 2015. In nine games with Almtuna, he posted a record of 6–3–0, a GAA of 2.58 and a save percentage of .895.

He returned to Almtuna for the 2015–16 season, as the team had become a prime development location in the league. In 42 games, Johansson had a record of 24–17–0 and recorded his first two professional shutouts, with a GAA of 2.39 and a save percentage of .913. He was briefly recalled by Brynäs in December 2015 after the loss of goaltender Felix Sandström. He was the backup in four games, but saw no playing time. Johansson repeated his loan to Almtuna for the third season in 2016–17, going 17–18–0 with three shutouts, a GAA of 2.26, and a save percentage of .912. He was recalled again by Brynäs in January 2017 and made two appearances for the club, going 1–1–0 with a shutout, a GAA of 2.00 and a save percentage of .920.

=== Buffalo Sabres ===
Johansson was selected by the Buffalo Sabres of the National Hockey League (NHL) in the third round, 61st overall, of the 2014 NHL entry draft. He joined the Sabres' American Hockey League (AHL) affiliate, the Rochester Americans, on a tryout in March 2017, playing behind starting goalie, Linus Ullmark. In seven games in the AHL, he went 3–3–0 with a GAA of 2.85 and a save percentage of 0.895. On 31 May 2017, Johansson agreed to a three-year, entry-level contract with the Sabres. He was assigned to the Sabres' ECHL affiliate, the Cincinnati Cyclones, to start the 2017–18 season, but on 8 January 2018, was recalled by Rochester. He was returned to Cincinnati, but was called up again by Rochester in March. In seven games with Rochester, he recorded three wins, three losses and one overtime loss (3–3–1) with a 2.85 GAA and a save percentage of .892. He was returned to the Cyclones where he helped them make the playoffs. In 27 games with the Cyclones, Johansson had a record of 14–11–1 with a GAA of 3.13 and a save percentage of .909. He set a new franchise record for shots saved in a playoff game for Cincinnati when he stopped 68 of 72 in game one of their first round series with the Fort Wayne Komets. Ultimately the team fell to the Komets in the first round and Johansson played in four of the five games of the series, going 1–3–0, with a 3.31 GAA and a save percentage of .921. He was once again assigned to Cincinnati of the ECHL for the 2018–19 season, being recalled twice by Rochester in December. He was returned to the ECHL on 4 February 2019 after appearing in five games with the Americans, going 4–1–0 with a GAA of 2.26 and a save percentage of .926. However, shortly after his return, it was announced on 22 February that Johansson had undergone surgery due to an injury that ended his season. In 27 games with the Cyclones, he went 18–5–3 with three shutouts, a GAA of 2.60 and a save percentage of .908.

After coming back from the injury, Johansson was assigned to Rochester to start the 2019–20 season. Johansson was selected to participate in the 2020 AHL All-Star Classic. He was recalled by Buffalo on 30 January 2020 after the team's starter, Linus Ullmark, suffered an injury. Johansson made his NHL debut on 4 February, in relief of Carter Hutton in a game against the Colorado Avalanche. His first NHL start came on 6 February, making 18 saves on 21 shots in a shootout loss to the Detroit Red Wings. Johansson recorded his first NHL win on 23 February, a 2–1 victory against the Winnipeg Jets. In six games with Buffalo, Johansson went 1–3–1 with a GAA of 2.94 and a save percentage of .894. However, the season was cut short, ending on 12 March due to the COVID-19 pandemic.

On 7 October, Johansson signed a one-year contract with the Sabres worth $700,000. With the following North American season delayed due to the pandemic, on 31 October, Johansson was loaned by the Sabres to German club, Krefeld Pinguine of the Deutsche Eishockey Liga (DEL), until the commencement of NHL training camp. However, before joining Krefeld, the DEL season was later delayed due to the pandemic and Johansson returned to the Sabres without having played a game. Instead, he opened the pandemic-delayed 2020–21 season with Buffalo on the taxi squad, eventually becoming the team's backup to Ullmark after Hutton suffered an injury. Playing sparsely through the first two months of the season, it was not until Ullmark went down with an injury in March that Johansson saw regular game time. In seven games with Buffalo, Johansson 0–5–1 with a GAA of 3.79 and a save percentage of .884.

=== Colorado Avalanche and Florida Panthers ===
On 20 March 2021, Johansson was traded to the Colorado Avalanche in exchange for a sixth-round draft pick in the 2021 NHL entry draft. The trade was delayed by a day as the Sabres waited to receive the results of several COVID-19 tests. Following the trade, Sabres beat writer John Vogl called Johansson the worst goaltender he had seen in nineteen years of covering the team. He made his debut with the club on 23 March in a 4–3 shootout loss to the Arizona Coyotes. He garnered his first victory in his second game with Colorado, a 3–2 win over the St. Louis Blues on 2 April. He recorded his first NHL shutout on 9 April in a 2–0 victory over the Anaheim Ducks. With the Avalanche, Johansson finished the regular season with a 5–1–1 record in eight appearances, with a GAA of 2.06 and a save percentage of .913. He was briefly demoted to the Avalanche's AHL affiliate, the Colorado Eagles on 1 May, where he played in one game, a loss, with a GAA of 5.11 and a save percentage of .808. He returned to the Avalanche and was in net on 13 May in a 5–1 victory over the Los Angeles Kings, winning the Central Division and earning the team the Presidents' Trophy. Despite the Avalanche advancing to the second round of the 2021 Stanley Cup playoffs, Johansson did not feature for the team. On 29 June, Johansson as a pending free agent opted to continue within the Avalanche organization, agreeing to a one-year, two-way contract extension. He began the 2021–22 season with Colorado as Darcy Kuemper's backup after Pavel Francouz went down with an injury, but played sparingly. However, he was surpassed by rookie Justus Annunen and on 13 December, was placed on waivers with the intention of sending Johansson to the AHL. In nine games with Colorado, he went 3–2–1, with a GAA of 3.73 and a save percentage of .885.

Johansson was claimed by the Florida Panthers. He did not see much playing time as the backup to Sergei Bobrovsky, making his first appearance on 24 February 2022, a 6–3 loss to the Columbus Blue Jackets. He was assigned to Florida's AHL affiliate, the Charlotte Checkers, on a conditioning stint in March, replaced by Spencer Knight as Bobrovsky's backup. He was recalled and made his second and final appearance for the team in a 10–2 loss to the Montreal Canadiens. He finished with a 0-2–0 record, a GAA of 7.74 and a save percentage of .766. Despite the Panthers making the second round of the 2022 Stanley Cup playoffs, Johansson did not feature.

As a free agent from the Panthers, Johansson opted to return to former club, the Colorado Avalanche, agreeing to a one-year, two-way contract on 13 July 2022. After attending training camp with the Avalanche, Johansson was placed on waivers during the pre-season on 29 September He was claimed the following day by their divisional rival, the Arizona Coyotes, on 30 September. Johansson made one pre-season appearance with the Coyotes before he was injured and placed on injured reserve prior to being placed back on waivers on 11 October. Johansson was re-claimed the following day off waivers by the Avalanche and re-assigned to join the Colorado Eagles to begin the 2022–23 season. In sharing starting goaltender duties with prospect Justus Annunen, Johansson made the most appearances in a season since 2018, going 14–9–2 with a 2.33 GAA and a save percentage .920. He was recalled by the Avalanche twice in December 2022 to serve as the team's backup. He made his NHL season debut on 31 December, coming on in relief of Alexander Georgiev after Georgiev was pulled in a 7–2 loss to the Toronto Maple Leafs. He was recalled one more time again in February 2023. In three appearances with the Avalanche, he went 2–0–0 with a GAA of 2.10 and a save percentage of .932. The Eagles made the 2023 Calder Cup playoffs and made it to the second round where they lost to the Coachella Valley Firebirds. Johansson made four playoff appearances, going 2–2–0, with a GAA of 2.75 and a save percentage of .885.

=== Tampa Bay Lightning ===
At the completion of the season with the Avalanche and as a pending free agent, Johansson initially opted to return to Sweden in signing a two-year contract with Färjestad BK of the SHL on 9 May 2023. However, in little under a month later on 7 June, his contract with Färjestad BK was mutually cancelled with Johansson harbouring intentions to continue his career in North America. On the opening day of free agency, on 1 July, Johansson was signed by the Tampa Bay Lightning to a two-year, $1.55 million contract. With starting goaltender Andrei Vasilevskiy out due to injury to start the 2023–24 season, Johansson made his Lightning debut on 10 October and earned his first win with the team in a 5–3 victory over the Nashville Predators. He marked his first shutout with the team on 24 October, a 3–0 victory over the Carolina Hurricanes. Vasilevskiy's return in November ended Johansson's tenure as starter and he played sparingly afterwards. In 26 games with Tampa Bay, he had a record of 12–7–5 with two shutouts, a GAA of 3.37 and a save percentage of .890. Though the Lightning made the 2024 Stanley Cup playoffs, he did not feature.

In his second year with Tampa Bay, he resumed his spot as Vasilevskiy's backup for the 2024–25 season. With Vasilevskiy now fully healthy, Johansson made fewer appearances than the previous season. In 19 appearances, he had a record of 9–6–3, one shutout, a GAA of 3.13, and a save percentage of .895. In the offseason, Johansson signed a two-year, $2.5 million contract with the Lightning. Once again the backup to Vasilevskiy for the 2025–26 season, he saw an increase in his playing time as Vasilevskiy went down with an injury in December. In early February 2026, Johansson himself suffered an injury to his knee that required surgery, missing the following weeks. In total he made 25 appearances, with a record of 11–10–2, a GAA of 3.29 and a save percentage of .884.

Going into the 2026–27 season, the Lightning sought to trade Johansson, as he no longer fit in their plans. However, finding no takers, he was placed on waivers by the team on 23 September. He went unclaimed and was assigned to Tampa Bay's AHL affiliate, the Syracuse Crunch, on 25 September.

=== Ottawa Senators ===
On 25 September 2026, Johansson was traded by the Tampa Bay Lightning to the Ottawa Senators for future considerations. He was initially assigned to Ottawa's AHL affiliate, the Belleville Senators to start the 2026–27 season, but was briefly recalled on 6 October after Ottawa's starting goaltender, Linus Ullmark, suffered an injury. After Ullmark's return, Johansson was returned to the AHL, only to be recalled again on 22 October after Ullmark was injured a second time. He made his debut with Ottawa on 25 October in a 7–4 victory over the New York Rangers. Johansson also earned his first NHL point in the game and became only the second goaltender to record one with the Senators. After making four appearances for Ottawa, he was sent back to Belleville on November 8.

== International play ==
Johansson won a silver medal with Sweden at the 2014 World Junior Championships in a backup role, having not featured for the team.

== Career statistics ==
=== Regular season and playoffs ===
			Regular season									Playoffs
Season	Team	League	GP	W	L	OT	MIN	GA	SO	GAA	SV%	GP	W	L	MIN	GA	SO	GAA	SV%
2011–12	Brynäs IF	J20	5	1	3	0	237	13	0	3.29	.890	—	—	—	—	—	—	—	—
2012–13	Brynäs IF	J20	29	14	15	0	1689	82	0	2.91	.899	2	0	2	124	4	0	1.94	.933
2013–14	Brynäs IF	J20	23	13	9	0	1345	52	1	2.32	.911	7	5	2	433	17	0	2.36	.892
2013–14	Brynäs IF	SHL	4	2	2	0	243	12	0	2.96	.914	—	—	—	—	—	—	—	—
2014–15	Brynäs IF	J20	13	6	6	0	763	46	0	3.62	.886	2	1	1	119	7	0	3.52	.904
2014–15	Brynäs IF	SHL	2	0	2	0	105	11	0	6.30	.843	—	—	—	—	—	—	—	—
2014–15	Almtuna IS	Allsv	9	6	3	0	534	23	0	2.58	.896	—	—	—	—	—	—	—	—
2015–16	Almtuna IS	Allsv	42	24	17	0	2556	102	2	2.39	.913	4	1	3	239	12	0	3.01	.892
2016–17	Almtuna IS	Allsv	37	17	18	0	2152	81	3	2.26	.913	4	1	3	235	8	0	2.04	.935
2016–17	Brynäs IF	SHL	2	1	1	0	120	4	1	2.00	.920	—	—	—	—	—	—	—	—
2016–17	Rochester Americans	AHL	7	3	3	1	421	20	0	2.85	.892	—	—	—	—	—	—	—	—
2017–18	Cincinnati Cyclones	ECHL	27	14	11	1	1514	79	0	3.13	.909	5	1	4	326	18	0	3.31	.921
2017–18	Rochester Americans	AHL	7	4	3	0	355	20	0	3.89	.861	—	—	—	—	—	—	—	—
2018–19	Cincinnati Cyclones	ECHL	27	18	15	3	1617	70	3	2.60	.908	—	—	—	—	—	—	—	—
2018–19	Rochester Americans	AHL	5	4	1	0	266	10	0	2.26	.926	—	—	—	—	—	—	—	—
2019–20	Rochester Americans	AHL	22	14	4	3	1213	46	2	2.28	.921	—	—	—	—	—	—	—	—
2019–20	Buffalo Sabres	NHL	6	1	3	1	327	16	0	2.94	.894	—	—	—	—	—	—	—	—
2020–21	Buffalo Sabres	NHL	7	0	5	1	380	24	0	3.79	.884	—	—	—	—	—	—	—	—
2020–21	Colorado Avalanche	NHL	8	5	1	1	437	15	1	2.06	.913	—	—	—	—	—	—	—	—
2020–21	Colorado Eagles	AHL	1	0	1	0	59	5	0	5.11	.808	—	—	—	—	—	—	—	—
2021–22	Colorado Avalanche	NHL	9	3	2	1	370	23	0	3.73	.885	—	—	—	—	—	—	—	—
2021–22	Florida Panthers	NHL	2	0	2	0	116	15	0	7.74	.766	—	—	—	—	—	—	—	—
2021–22	Charlotte Checkers	AHL	1	0	0	0	33	2	0	3.67	.889	—	—	—	—	—	—	—	—
2022–23	Colorado Eagles	AHL	26	14	9	2	1545	60	0	2.33	.920	4	2	2	240	11	1	2.75	.885
2022–23	Colorado Avalanche	NHL	3	2	0	0	143	5	0	2.10	.932	—	—	—	—	—	—	—	—
2023–24	Tampa Bay Lightning	NHL	26	12	7	5	1477	83	2	3.37	.890	—	—	—	—	—	—	—	—
2024–25	Tampa Bay Lightning	NHL	19	9	6	3	1110	58	1	3.13	.895	—	—	—	—	—	—	—	—
2025–26	Tampa Bay Lightning	NHL	25	11	10	2	1424	78	0	3.29	.884	—	—	—	—	—	—	—	—
SHL totals			8	3	5	0	468	27	1	3.46	.896	—	—	—	—	—	—	—	—
NHL totals			105	43	36	14	5,784	317	4	3.29	.889	—	—	—	—	—	—	—	—

=== International ===
Year	Team	Event	Result	GP	W	L	OT	MIN	GA	SO	GAA	SV%
2012	Sweden	U17	4th	3	—	—	—	—	—	—	4.63	.862
2012	Sweden	IH18	3rd place, bronze medalist(s)	3	—	—	—	—	—	—	3.43	.870
2013	Sweden	U18	5th	4	2	2	0	216	8	1	2.23	.931
2014	Sweden	WJC	2nd place, silver medalist(s)	—	—	—	—	—	—	—	—	—
Junior totals				10	—	—	—	—	—	—	—	—

== Awards and honours ==
Awards	Year	Ref
AHL
All-Star Game	2020	
