= Gabriel Fortier =

Canadian ice hockey player

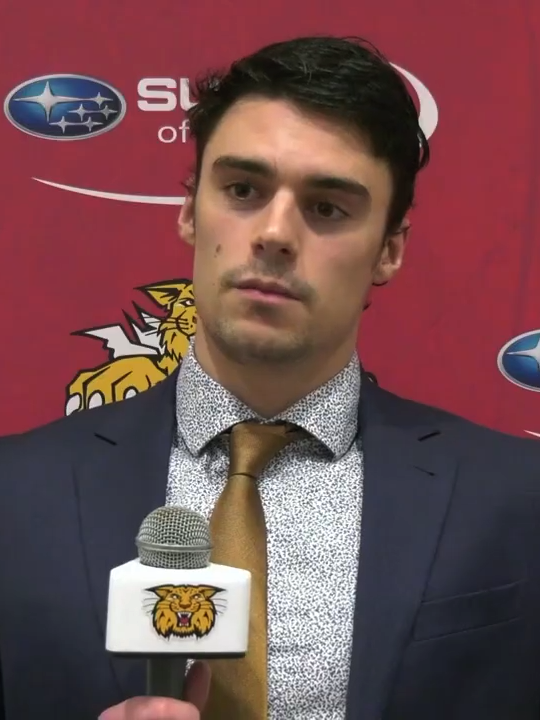
- Fortier in 2020
- Born: February 6, 2000 (age 26) Lachine, Quebec, Canada
- Height: 5 ft 10 in (178 cm)
- Weight: 179 lb (81 kg; 12 st 11 lb)
- Position: Left wing
- Shoots: Left
- SHL team Former teams: Leksands IF; Tampa Bay Lightning
- NHL draft: 59th overall, 2018; Tampa Bay Lightning
- Playing career: 2019–present

Gabriel Fortier (born February 6, 2000) is a Canadian professional ice hockey forward for Leksands IF of the Swedish Hockey League (SHL). Fortier was drafted in the 2018 NHL entry draft in the second round (59th) by the Tampa Bay Lightning.

== Playing career ==
=== Junior ===
Fortier was selected 4th overall in the 2016 Quebec Major Junior Hockey League (QMJHL) entry level draft by the Baie-Comeau Drakkar.

On June 23, 2018, the Lightning selected Fortier with the 59th overall pick in the 2nd-round of the 2018 NHL entry draft. Fortier recorded 26 goals and 33 assists during his draft year with the Baie-Comeau Drakkar.

On January 2, 2020, the Drakkar traded Fortier to the Moncton Wildcats of the QMJHL. Fortier finished his career with the Drakkar having scored 191 points over 195 games. Fortier was also captain of the Drakkar prior to the trade to Moncton.

=== Professional ===
On November 29, 2021, Fortier was recalled by the Lightning due to captain Steven Stamkos being unable to play for personal reasons. On November 30, 2021, Fortier made his NHL debut with the Lightning against the St. Louis Blues at the Enterprise Center.

On June 21, 2023, the Lightning re-signed Fortier to a one-year, two-way contract.

Leaving the Lightning after five seasons within the organization, Fortier signed abroad to a one-year contract with Swedish club, Leksands IF of the SHL, on July 15, 2025.

== Career statistics ==
=== Regular season and playoffs ===
			Regular season					Playoffs
Season	Team	League	GP	G	A	Pts	PIM	GP	G	A	Pts	PIM
2016–17	Baie-Comeau Drakkar	QMJHL	25	11	6	17	4	1	0	0	0	0
2017–18	Baie-Comeau Drakkar	QMJHL	66	26	33	59	59	5	3	1	4	0
2018–19	Baie-Comeau Drakkar	QMJHL	68	35	48	83	27	7	1	2	3	6
2018–19	Syracuse Crunch	AHL	4	0	0	0	0	1	0	0	0	0
2019–20	Baie-Comeau Drakkar	QMJHL	36	17	15	32	16	—	—	—	—	—
2019–20	Moncton Wildcats	QMJHL	28	15	16	31	10	—	—	—	—	—
2020–21	Moncton Wildcats	QMJHL	13	6	2	8	6	—	—	—	—	—
2020–21	Syracuse Crunch	AHL	30	6	4	10	2	—	—	—	—	—
2021–22	Syracuse Crunch	AHL	72	14	21	35	33	5	0	1	1	6
2021–22	Tampa Bay Lightning	NHL	10	1	0	1	4	—	—	—	—	—
2022–23	Syracuse Crunch	AHL	67	11	18	29	29	5	0	0	0	0
2022–23	Tampa Bay Lightning	NHL	1	0	0	0	0	—	—	—	—	—
2023–24	Syracuse Crunch	AHL	62	13	13	26	12	8	1	4	5	0
2024–25	Syracuse Crunch	AHL	50	11	8	19	18	3	0	1	1	0
NHL totals			11	1	0	1	4	—	—	—	—	—

=== International ===
Year	Team	Event	Result	GP	G	A	Pts	PIM
2017	Canada	IH18	1st place, gold medalist(s)	5	2	0	2	0
Junior totals				5	2	0	2	0
