= Waltteri Merelä =

Finnish ice hockey player

- Born: 6 July 1998 (age 28) Ylöjärvi, Finland
- Height: 6 ft 2 in (188 cm)
- Weight: 196 lb (89 kg; 14 st 0 lb)
- Position: Forward
- Shoots: Right
- NL team Former teams: SC Bern; Pelicans; Tappara; Tampa Bay Lightning
- National team: Finland
- NHL draft: Undrafted
- Playing career: 2018–present

Waltteri Merelä (born 6 July 1998) is a Finnish professional ice hockey player who is a forward for SC Bern of the National League (NL).

== Playing career ==
Merelä made his SM-liiga debut appearance for Pelicans during the 2018–19 season. In December 2021, he made his debut in the Finland men's national ice hockey team.

As an undrafted free agent, on 5 June 2023, Merelä left the SM-liiga after 5 seasons by signing a one-year, two-way contract with the Tampa Bay Lightning. Merelä made the opening night roster to begin the 2023–24 season with the Lightning. He made 19 appearances with Tampa Bay over the course of the season, while also splitting the campaign with AHL affiliate, the Syracuse Crunch, posting 34 points through 54 regular season games.

At the conclusion of the season, Merelä opted to leave the Lightning and returned to Europe in signing a one-year contract with Swiss club, SC Bern of the NL, on 10 June 2024.

Medal record

Men's ice hockey

Representing Finland

World Championships
| Gold medal – first place | 2026 Switzerland | |

== Career statistics ==
=== Regular season and playoffs ===
| | | | Regular season | | | | | Playoffs |
| Season | Team | League | GP | G | A | Pts | PIM | GP | G | A | Pts | PIM |
|---|---|---|---|---|---|---|---|---|---|---|---|---|
| 2016–17 | Tappara | Jr. A | 30 | 4 | 6 | 10 | 6 | 2 | 0 | 0 | 0 | 0 |
| 2017–18 | Tappara | Jr. A | 36 | 10 | 14 | 24 | 10 | 7 | 2 | 2 | 4 | 2 |
| 2018–19 | Lahti Pelicans | Jr. A | 32 | 22 | 32 | 54 | 67 | 10 | 3 | 6 | 9 | 12 |
| 2018–19 | Lahti Pelicans | Liiga | 9 | 0 | 1 | 1 | 0 | — | — | — | — | — |
| 2018–19 | Peliitat | Mestis | 9 | 1 | 4 | 5 | 0 | — | — | — | — | — |
| 2019–20 | Lahti Pelicans | Liiga | 48 | 7 | 11 | 18 | 16 | — | — | — | — | — |
| 2019–20 | Lahti Pelicans | Jr. A | 2 | 1 | 2 | 3 | 6 | 1 | 0 | 0 | 0 | 0 |
| 2019–20 | Peliitat | Mestis | 10 | 3 | 4 | 7 | 14 | — | — | — | — | — |
| 2020–21 | Lahti Pelicans | Liiga | 57 | 10 | 17 | 27 | 55 | 5 | 1 | 0 | 1 | 4 |
| 2021–22 | Tappara | Liiga | 57 | 21 | 23 | 44 | 38 | 15 | 1 | 7 | 8 | 8 |
| 2022–23 | Tappara | Liiga | 41 | 15 | 18 | 33 | 47 | 14 | 8 | 6 | 14 | 4 |
| 2023–24 | Tampa Bay Lightning | NHL | 19 | 1 | 0 | 1 | 4 | — | — | — | — | — |
| 2023–24 | Syracuse Crunch | AHL | 55 | 15 | 19 | 34 | 16 | 8 | 3 | 0 | 3 | 2 |
| 2024–25 | SC Bern | NL | 52 | 21 | 26 | 47 | 27 | 7 | 2 | 2 | 4 | 6 |
| 2025–26 | SC Bern | NL | 43 | 12 | 14 | 26 | 14 | 2 | 1 | 0 | 1 | 2 |
| Liiga totals | | | 212 | 53 | 70 | 123 | 156 | 34 | 10 | 13 | 23 | 16 |
| NHL totals | | | 19 | 1 | 0 | 1 | 4 | — | — | — | — | — |
| NL totals | | | 95 | 33 | 40 | 73 | 41 | 9 | 3 | 2 | 5 | 8 |

=== International ===
| Year | Team | Event | Result | GP | G | A | Pts | PIM |
|---|---|---|---|---|---|---|---|---|
| 2023 | Finland | WC | 7th | 1 | 1 | 0 | 1 | 0 |
| 2025 | Finland | WC | 7th | 8 | 1 | 1 | 2 | 4 |
| 2026 | Finland | WC | 1st place, gold medalist(s) | 10 | 1 | 3 | 4 | 6 |
| Senior totals | | | | 19 | 3 | 4 | 7 | 10 |
