= Jack Thompson (ice hockey) =

Canadian ice hockey player (born 2002)

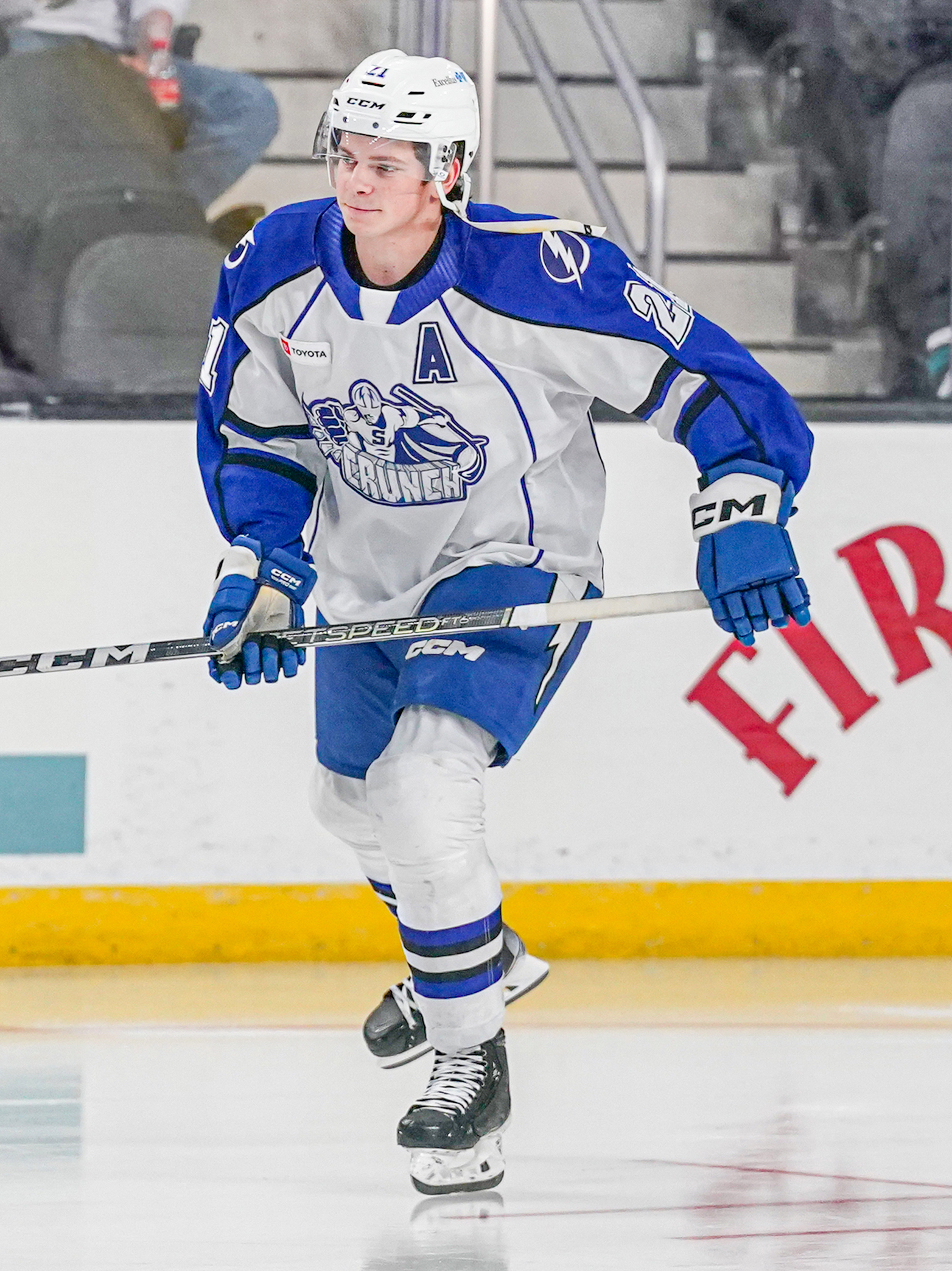
- Thompson with the Syracuse Crunch in 2024
- Born: March 19, 2002 (age 24) Courtice, Ontario, Canada
- Height: 6 ft 1 in (185 cm)
- Weight: 189 lb (86 kg; 13 st 7 lb)
- Position: Defence
- Shoots: Right
- NHL team (P) Cur. team Former teams: Vancouver Canucks; Abbotsford Canucks (AHL); Tampa Bay Lightning; San Jose Sharks
- NHL draft: 93rd overall, 2020; Tampa Bay Lightning
- Playing career: 2020–present

Jack Thompson (born March 19, 2002) is a Canadian professional ice hockey player for the Abbotsford Canucks of the American Hockey League (AHL) while under contract to the Vancouver Canucks of the National Hockey League (NHL). He was selected 93rd overall in the 2020 NHL entry draft by the Tampa Bay Lightning, and has also played in the NHL for the San Jose Sharks.

== Playing career ==
On October 7, 2020, the Tampa Bay Lightning selected Thompson with the 93rd overall pick in the third round of the 2020 NHL entry draft.

During the 2020–21 OHL season, Thompson was loaned to Surahammars IF of Sweden's Division 1. Thompson went there while waiting for the Ontario Hockey League (OHL) season to resume due to the COVID-19 pause. The OHL subsequently decide to cancel the season.

On May 18, 2021, the Tampa Bay Lightning signed Thompson to a three-year, entry-level contract. Thompson had appeared in 18 games with Surahammars IF the prior season, recording nine goals and nine assists for 18 points. He also appeared in one game with Tampa Bay' American Hockey League (AHL) affiliate, the Syracuse Crunch. Thompson recorded an assist in his professional debut. Prior to that, Thompson had appeared in 115 career games with the Sudbury Wolves of the OHL.

On January 6, 2024, Thompson made his NHL debut with the Lightning against the Boston Bruins at TD Garden. On March 7, Thompson was traded with a 2024 third-round draft pick to the San Jose Sharks in exchange for Anthony Duclair. On April 15, Thompson made his Sharks debut in a 9–2 loss to the Edmonton Oilers. He re-signed to a one-year contract with the Sharks.

During the 2025–26 season, on March 5, 2026, Thompson was traded by the Sharks to the Vancouver Canucks in exchange for Jett Woo.

== Career statistics ==
=== Regular season and playoffs ===
			Regular season					Playoffs
Season	Team	League	GP	G	A	Pts	PIM	GP	G	A	Pts	PIM
2018–19	Sudbury Wolves	OHL	52	6	10	16	18	8	1	4	5	2
2019–20	Sudbury Wolves	OHL	63	13	19	32	20	—	—	—	—	—
2020–21	Surahammars IF	Div.1	18	9	9	18	14	—	—	—	—	—
2020–21	Syracuse Crunch	AHL	1	0	1	1	0	—	—	—	—	—
2021–22	Sudbury Wolves	OHL	29	8	15	23	24	—	—	—	—	—
2021–22	Soo Greyhounds	OHL	36	13	21	34	10	9	6	8	14	11
2022–23	Syracuse Crunch	AHL	71	8	15	23	18	5	0	2	2	2
2023–24	Syracuse Crunch	AHL	46	5	27	32	12	—	—	—	—	—
2023–24	Tampa Bay Lightning	NHL	1	0	0	0	0	—	—	—	—	—
2023–24	San Jose Barracuda	AHL	16	1	8	9	4	—	—	—	—	—
2023–24	San Jose Sharks	NHL	2	0	0	0	0	—	—	—	—	—
2024–25	San Jose Sharks	NHL	31	4	6	10	10	—	—	—	—	—
2024–25	San Jose Barracuda	AHL	27	3	11	14	6	6	0	0	0	0
2025–26	San Jose Barracuda	AHL	42	3	9	12	12	—	—	—	—	—
2025–26	Abbotsford Canucks	AHL	14	3	10	13	8	—	—	—	—	—
NHL totals			34	4	6	10	10	—	—	—	—	—

=== International ===
Year	Team	Event	Result	GP	G	A	Pts	PIM
2018	Canada Red	U17	4th	6	0	0	0	6
2022	Canada	WJC	1st place, gold medalist(s)	7	1	3	4	2
Junior totals				13	1	3	4	8

== Awards & honours ==
Award	Year	Ref
OHL
Second All-Star Team	2022	
AHL
All-Star Game	2024	
