= 2023–24 Vegas Golden Knights season =

National Hockey League season

2023–24 Vegas Golden Knights
- Division: 4th Pacific
- Conference: 8th Western
- 2023–24 record: 45–29–8
- Home record: 27–12–2
- Road record: 18–17–6
- Goals for: 267
- Goals against: 245

Team information
- General manager: Kelly McCrimmon
- Coach: Bruce Cassidy
- Captain: Mark Stone
- Alternate captains: Jack Eichel; William Karlsson; Alex Pietrangelo
- Arena: T-Mobile Arena
- Average attendance: 18,137
- Minor league affiliates: Henderson Silver Knights (AHL); Savannah Ghost Pirates (ECHL)

Team leaders
- Goals: Jonathan Marchessault (42)
- Assists: Jack Eichel; Mark Stone; Shea Theodore (37)
- Points: Jonathan Marchessault (69)
- Penalty minutes: Keegan Kolesar (49)
- Plus/minus: Brayden McNabb (+18)
- Wins: Logan Thompson (25)
- Goals against average: Logan Thompson (2.70)

The 2023–24 Vegas Golden Knights season was the seventh season for the National Hockey League (NHL) franchise that started playing in the 2017–18 season. The Golden Knights entered the season as the defending Stanley Cup champions.

During the season, Vegas started off hot, winning the first seven games, the most wins to start a season from a defending cup champion. The Golden Knights played in the 2024 Winter Classic, losing 3–0 to the Seattle Kraken at T-Mobile Park on January 1, 2024.

After a 7–0 win against the Colorado Avalanche on November 4, Vegas struggled throughout the rest of the season, stumbling from first in the Western Conference to a wild card spot. This included a 4–5–1 February slump, and a 2–8–1 record between February 12 and March 7. On April 12, the Golden Knights clinched a playoff berth for the sixth time in their first seven seasons, following a 7–2 win over the Minnesota Wild and a 5–2 loss by the St. Louis Blues to the Carolina Hurricanes. In the playoffs, the Golden Knights faced the Dallas Stars, losing in seven games in the first round; despite taking a 2–0 series lead, Dallas went on to win four of the last five games.

== Standings ==
=== Divisional standings ===
Pacific Division
Pos	Team	GP	W	L	OTL	RW	GF	GA	GD	Pts
1	y – Vancouver Canucks	82	50	23	9	44	279	223	+56	109
2	x – Edmonton Oilers	82	49	27	6	39	294	237	+57	104
3	x – Los Angeles Kings	82	44	27	11	37	256	215	+41	99
4	x – Vegas Golden Knights	82	45	29	8	34	267	245	+22	98
5	Calgary Flames	82	38	39	5	32	253	271	−18	81
6	Seattle Kraken	82	34	35	13	28	217	236	−19	81
7	Anaheim Ducks	82	27	50	5	21	204	295	−91	59
8	San Jose Sharks	82	19	54	9	14	181	331	−150	47

Source: National Hockey League
Rules for classification: 1) Fewer number of games played (GP, only during regular season); 2) Greater number of regulation wins (RW); 3) Greater number of wins in regulation and overtime, excluding shootout wins (ROW); 4) Greater number of total wins, including shootouts (W); 5) Greater number of points earned in head-to-head play; if teams played an uneven number of head-to-head games, the result of the first game on the home ice of the team with the extra home game is discarded; 6) Greater goal differential (GD); 7) Greater number of goals scored (GF)
x – Clinched playoff spot; y – Clinched division

=== Conference standings ===
Western Conference Wild Card
Pos	Div	Team	GP	W	L	OTL	RW	GF	GA	GD	Pts
1	CE	x – Nashville Predators	82	47	30	5	38	269	248	+21	99
2	PA	x – Vegas Golden Knights	82	45	29	8	34	267	245	+22	98
3	CE	St. Louis Blues	82	43	33	6	31	239	250	−11	92
4	CE	Minnesota Wild	82	39	34	9	32	251	263	−12	87
5	PA	Calgary Flames	82	38	39	5	32	253	271	−18	81
6	PA	Seattle Kraken	82	34	35	13	28	217	236	−19	81
7	CE	Arizona Coyotes	82	36	41	5	28	256	274	−18	77
8	PA	Anaheim Ducks	82	27	50	5	21	204	295	−91	59
9	CE	Chicago Blackhawks	82	23	53	6	17	179	290	−111	52
10	PA	San Jose Sharks	82	19	54	9	14	181	331	−150	47

Source: National Hockey League
Rules for classification: 1) Fewer number of games played (GP, only during regular season); 2) Greater number of regulation wins (RW); 3) Greater number of wins in regulation and overtime, excluding shootout wins (ROW); 4) Greater number of total wins, including shootouts (W); 5) Greater number of points earned in head-to-head play; if teams played an uneven number of head-to-head games, the result of the first game on the home ice of the team with the extra home game is discarded; 6) Greater goal differential (GD); 7) Greater number of goals scored (GF)
x – Clinched playoff spot

== Schedule and results ==
=== Preseason ===
The 2023 preseason schedule was published on June 22, 2023.

2023 preseason game log: 3–3–1 (home: 2–1–1; road: 1–2–0)
#	Date	Visitor	Score	Home	OT	Decision	Attendance	Record	Recap
1	September 24	Vegas	2–5	San Jose		Patera	9,785	0–1–0
2	September 25	Vegas	2–3	Colorado		Patera	13,294	0–2–0
3	September 27	Los Angeles	4–3	Vegas	OT	Hill	17,427	0–2–1
4	September 29	Arizona	1–3	Vegas		Thompson	17,501	1–2–1
5	October 3	San Jose	2–0	Vegas		Hill	17,406	1–3–1
6	October 5	Colorado	3–4	Vegas		Thompson	17,539	2–3–1
7	October 7	Vegas	7–4	Los Angeles		Hill	15,080	3–3–1

=== Regular season ===
The regular season schedule was published on June 27, 2023.

2023–24 game log

October: 9–0–1 (home: 5–0–1; road: 4–0–0)
#	Date	Visitor	Score	Home	OT	Decision	Attendance	Record	Pts	Recap
1	October 10	Seattle	1–4	Vegas		Hill	18,724	1–0–0	2
2	October 12	Vegas	4–1	San Jose		Thompson	17,435	2–0–0	4
3	October 14	Anaheim	1–4	Vegas		Hill	18,033	3–0–0	6
4	October 17	Dallas	2–3	Vegas	SO	Hill	17,612	4–0–0	8
5	October 19	Vegas	5–3	Winnipeg		Thompson	11,521	5–0–0	10
6	October 21	Vegas	5–3	Chicago		Hill	19,867	6–0–0	12
7	October 24	Philadelphia	2–3	Vegas		Thompson	17,717	7–0–0	14
8	October 27	Chicago	4–3	Vegas	OT	Hill	18,338	7–0–1	15
9	October 28	Vegas	4–3	Los Angeles	SO	Thompson	18,145	8–0–1	17
10	October 30	Montreal	2–3	Vegas	SO	Hill	17,791	9–0–1	19

November: 6–5–3 (home: 3–2–0; road: 3–3–3)
#	Date	Visitor	Score	Home	OT	Decision	Attendance	Record	Pts	Recap
11	November 2	Winnipeg	2–5	Vegas		Thompson	17,878	10–0–1	21
12	November 4	Colorado	0–7	Vegas		Hill	18,512	11–0–1	23
13	November 5	Vegas	2–4	Anaheim		Thompson	15,720	11–1–1	23
14	November 8	Los Angeles	4–1	Vegas		Hill	18,330	11–2–1	23
15	November 10	San Jose	0–5	Vegas		Hill	18,423	12–2–1	25
16	November 14	Vegas	0–3	Washington		Thompson	16,598	12–3–1	25
17	November 16	Vegas	6–5	Montreal		Hill	21,105	13–3–1	27
18	November 18	Vegas	3–4	Philadelphia	OT	Thompson	18,113	13–3–2	28
19	November 19	Vegas	0–3	Pittsburgh		Hill	18,120	13–4–2	28
20	November 22	Vegas	2–1	Dallas	OT	Hill	18,532	14–4–2	30
21	November 25	Arizona	2–0	Vegas		Thompson	18,591	14–5–2	30
22	November 27	Vegas	1–2	Calgary	OT	Hill	17,031	14–5–3	31
23	November 28	Vegas	4–5	Edmonton	SO	Thompson	18,098	14–5–4	32
24	November 30	Vegas	4–1	Vancouver		Hill	18,856	15–5–4	34

December: 7–5–1 (home: 5–1–1; road: 2–4–0)
#	Date	Visitor	Score	Home	OT	Decision	Attendance	Record	Pts	Recap
25	December 2	Washington	1–4	Vegas		Thompson	18,140	16–5–4	36
26	December 4	St. Louis	2–1	Vegas	OT	Thompson	17,826	16–5–5	37
27	December 6	Vegas	6–3	St. Louis		Thompson	18,096	17–5–5	39
28	December 9	Vegas	6–1	Dallas		Thompson	18,532	18–5–5	41
29	December 10	San Jose	4–5	Vegas	SO	Patera	17,849	19–5–5	43
30	December 12	Calgary	4–5	Vegas	OT	Thompson	17,814	20–5–5	45
31	December 15	Buffalo	5–2	Vegas		Thompson	18,008	20–6–5	45
32	December 17	Ottawa	3–6	Vegas		Thompson	17,892	21–6–5	47
33	December 19	Vegas	3–6	Carolina		Thompson	18,848	21–7–5	47
34	December 21	Vegas	4–5	Tampa Bay		Patera	19,092	21–8–5	47
35	December 23	Vegas	2–4	Florida		Patera	19,364	21–9–5	47
36	December 27	Vegas	2–5	Anaheim		Thompson	15,109	21–10–5	47
37	December 28	Los Angeles	2–3	Vegas		Thompson	18,595	22–10–5	49

January: 7–5–1 (home: 5–2–0; road: 2–3–1)
#	Date	Visitor	Score	Home	OT	Decision	Attendance	Record	Pts	Recap
38	January 1	Vegas	0–3	Seattle		Thompson	47,313 (outdoors)	22–11–5	49
39	January 4	Florida	4–1	Vegas		Thompson	18,044	22–12–5	49
40	January 6	NY Islanders	2–5	Vegas		Thompson	18,312	23–12–5	51
41	January 10	Vegas	0–3	Colorado		Patera	18,039	23–13–5	51
42	January 11	Boston	1–2	Vegas	OT	Thompson	18,209	24–13–5	53
43	January 13	Calgary	3–1	Vegas		Thompson	17,858	24–14–5	53
44	January 15	Nashville	1–4	Vegas		Thompson	17,719	25–14–5	55
45	January 18	NY Rangers	1–5	Vegas		Thompson	18,149	26–14–5	57
46	January 20	Pittsburgh	2–3	Vegas		Thompson	18,319	27–14–5	59
47	January 22	Vegas	5–6	New Jersey	OT	Thompson	16,514	27–14–6	60
48	January 23	Vegas	3–2	NY Islanders		Hill	16,077	28–14–6	62
49	January 26	Vegas	5–2	NY Rangers		Hill	18,006	29–14–6	64
50	January 27	Vegas	2–5	Detroit		Thompson	19,515	29–15–6	64

February: 4–5–1 (home: 1–4–0; road: 3–1–1)
#	Date	Visitor	Score	Home	OT	Decision	Attendance	Record	Pts	Recap
51	February 6	Edmonton	1–3	Vegas		Hill	18,433	30–15–6	66
52	February 8	Vegas	3–2	Arizona		Hill	4,600	31–15–6	68
53	February 12	Minnesota	5–3	Vegas		Hill	18,207	31–16–6	68
54	February 17	Carolina	3–1	Vegas		Hill	18,355	31–17–6	68
55	February 19	Vegas	4–0	San Jose		Thompson	13,673	32–17–6	70
56	February 20	Nashville	5–3	Vegas		Hill	17,727	32–18–6	70
57	February 22	Toronto	7–3	Vegas		Thompson	18,188	32–19–6	70
58	February 24	Vegas	3–4	Ottawa	SO	Thompson	19,197	32–19–7	71
59	February 27	Vegas	6–2	Toronto		Hill	18,907	33–19–7	73
60	February 29	Vegas	4–5	Boston		Hill	17,850	33–20–7	73

March: 8–5–1 (home: 4–2–0; road: 4–3–1)
#	Date	Visitor	Score	Home	OT	Decision	Attendance	Record	Pts	Recap
61	March 2	Vegas	2–7	Buffalo		Thompson	16,693	33–21–7	73
62	March 4	Vegas	3–6	Columbus		Hill	17,338	33–22–7	73
63	March 7	Vancouver	3–1	Vegas		Hill	18,054	33–23–7	73
64	March 9	Detroit	3–5	Vegas		Hill	18,401	34–23–7	75
65	March 12	Vegas	5–4	Seattle	OT	Hill	17,151	35–23–7	77
66	March 14	Vegas	1–4	Calgary		Hill	16,998	35–24–7	77
67	March 17	New Jersey	1–3	Vegas		Thompson	18,234	36–24–7	79
68	March 19	Tampa Bay	5–3	Vegas		Hill	17,789	36–25–7	79
69	March 21	Seattle	1–3	Vegas		Thompson	18,033	37–25–7	81
70	March 23	Columbus	2–4	Vegas		Hill	18,225	38–25–7	83
71	March 25	Vegas	2–1	St. Louis	OT	Thompson	18,096	39–25–7	85
72	March 26	Vegas	4–5	Nashville	OT	Patera	17,778	39–25–8	86
73	March 28	Vegas	4–1	Winnipeg		Thompson	15,225	40–25–8	88
74	March 30	Vegas	2–1	Minnesota	OT	Thompson	19,178	41–25–8	90

April: 4–4–0 (home: 4–1–0; road: 0–3–0)
#	Date	Visitor	Score	Home	OT	Decision	Attendance	Record	Pts	Recap
75	April 2	Vancouver	3–6	Vegas		Thompson	18,366	42–25–8	92
76	April 5	Vegas	4–7	Arizona		Thompson	4,600	42–26–8	92
77	April 8	Vegas	3–4	Vancouver		Thompson	18,899	42–27–8	92
78	April 10	Vegas	1–5	Edmonton		Hill	18,347	42–28–8	92
79	April 12	Minnesota	2–7	Vegas		Thompson	18,415	43–28–8	94
80	April 14	Colorado	3–4	Vegas	OT	Hill	18,239	44–28–8	96
81	April 16	Chicago	1–3	Vegas		Thompson	18,222	45–28–8	98
82	April 18	Anaheim	4–1	Vegas		Hill	18,109	45–29–8	98

Legend: Win (2 points) Loss (0 points) Overtime/shootout loss (1 point)

=== Playoffs ===
2024 Stanley Cup playoffs

Western Conference first round vs. (C1) Dallas Stars: Dallas won 4–3
#	Date	Visitor	Score	Home	OT	Decision	Attendance	Series	Recap
1	April 22	Vegas	4–3	Dallas		Thompson	18,532	1–0
2	April 24	Vegas	3–1	Dallas		Thompson	18,532	2–0
3	April 27	Dallas	3–2	Vegas	OT	Thompson	18,536	2–1
4	April 29	Dallas	4–2	Vegas		Thompson	18,333	2–2
5	May 1	Vegas	2–3	Dallas		Hill	18,532	2–3
6	May 3	Dallas	0–2	Vegas		Hill	18,432	3–3
7	May 5	Vegas	1–2	Dallas		Hill	19,046	3–4

Legend: Win Loss

== Player statistics ==
Updated to games played May 5, 2024

=== Skaters ===
Regular season
Player	GP	G	A	Pts	+/−	PIM
Jonathan Marchessault	82	42	27	69	–2	40
Jack Eichel	63	31	37	68	+4	27
William Karlsson	70	30	30	60	+15	22
Mark Stone	56	16	37	53	+1	22
Chandler Stephenson	75	16	35	51	–9	25
Ivan Barbashev	82	19	26	45	+15	42
Shea Theodore	47	5	37	42	+4	6
Nicolas Roy	70	13	28	41	+8	29
Alex Pietrangelo	64	4	29	33	–5	24
Michael Amadio	73	14	13	27	+4	16
Brayden McNabb	82	4	22	26	+18	37
Paul Cotter	76	7	18	25	–11	41
Pavel Dorofeyev	47	13	11	24	+8	12
Brett Howden	72	8	11	19	–11	39
Keegan Kolesar	79	8	10	18	–8	49
Alec Martinez	55	4	13	17	–2	6
Zach Whitecloud	61	2	12	14	–3	32
Noah Hanifin^{†}	19	2	10	12	+6	2
Nicolas Hague	73	2	10	12	–5	43
Anthony Mantha^{†}	18	3	7	10	+6	8
Ben Hutton	41	2	8	10	+12	17
Kaedan Korczak	26	1	8	9	+12	8
William Carrier	39	6	2	8	+3	16
Brendan Brisson	15	2	6	8	–5	2
Mason Morelli	9	3	1	4	–3	0
Tomas Hertl^{†}	6	2	2	4	–2	0
Sheldon Rempal	9	2	1	3	–2	4
Jonas Rondbjerg	20	1	2	3	+2	0
Brayden Pachal^{‡}	17	1	0	1	–2	12
Lukas Cormier	2	0	1	1	+1	0
Byron Froese	16	0	1	1	–2	4
Tobias Bjornfot^{†‡}	2	0	0	0	–2	2
Daniil Miromanov^{‡}	4	0	0	0	–2	0
Grigori Denisenko	6	0	0	0	–3	2

Playoffs
Player	GP	G	A	Pts	+/−	PIM
Jack Eichel	7	3	4	7	0	0
Noah Hanifin	7	2	3	5	–2	0
Brayden McNabb	7	2	3	5	+5	0
Jonathan Marchessault	7	2	2	4	+1	2
Ivan Barbashev	7	0	4	4	+3	0
Mark Stone	7	3	0	3	–2	2
Michael Amadio	4	1	1	2	+2	0
Brett Howden	7	1	1	2	+1	0
William Karlsson	7	0	2	2	+4	0
William Carrier	7	1	0	1	+1	6
Tomas Hertl	7	1	0	1	–6	2
Chandler Stephenson	7	0	1	1	–3	8
Alex Pietrangelo	7	0	1	1	0	4
Pavel Dorofeyev	1	0	0	0	0	0
Nicolas Hague	1	0	0	0	0	0
Nicolas Hague	1	0	0	0	+1	0
Anthony Mantha	3	0	0	0	–1	2
Zach Whitecloud	6	0	0	0	0	2
Keegan Kolesar	6	0	0	0	–1	2
Alec Martinez	6	0	0	0	–2	0
Nicolas Roy	7	0	0	0	+1	4
Shea Theodore	7	0	0	0	+2	0

=== Goaltenders ===
Regular season
Player	GP	GS	TOI	W	L	OT	GA	GAA	SA	SV%	SO	G	A	PIM
Logan Thompson	46	42	2,645:28	25	14	5	119	2.70	1,298	.908	1	0	3	0
Adin Hill	35	35	1,968:49	19	12	2	89	2.71	957	.909	2	0	1	0
Jiri Patera	6	5	316:46	1	3	1	21	3.98	196	.893	0	0	0	0

Playoffs
Player	GP	GS	TOI	W	L	GA	GAA	SA	SV%	SO	G	A	PIM
Logan Thompson	4	4	255:00	2	2	10	2.35	127	.921	0	0	0	0
Adin Hill	3	3	176:17	1	2	5	1.70	72	.931	1	0	0	0

^{†}Denotes player spent time with another team before joining the Golden Knights. Stats reflect time with the Golden Knights only.
^{‡}Denotes player was traded or waived mid-season. Stats reflect time with the Golden Knights only.
Bold denotes new franchise record.

== Transactions ==
The Golden Knights have been involved in the following transactions during the 2023–24 season.

=== Trades ===
* Retained Salary Transaction: Each team is allowed up to three contracts on their payroll where they have retained salary in a trade (i.e. the player no longer plays with Team A due to a trade to Team B, but Team A still retains some salary). Only up to 50% of a player's contract can be kept, and only up to 15% of a team's salary cap can be taken up by retained salary. A contract can only be involved in one of these trades twice.

Date	Details		Ref
June 28, 2023	To Pittsburgh Penguins Reilly Smith	To Vegas Golden Knights VGK 3rd-round pick in 2024	
June 29, 2023	To Columbus Blue Jackets 7th-round pick in 2023	To Vegas Golden Knights 7th-round pick in 2024	
March 5, 2023	To Washington Capitals 2nd-round pick in 2024; 4th-round pick in 2026	To Vegas Golden Knights Anthony Mantha*	
March 6, 2024	To Philadelphia Flyers 5th-round pick in 2024	To Vegas Golden Knights Noah Hanifin*	
March 6, 2024	To Calgary Flames Daniil Miromanov conditional 1st-round pick in 2025 or 1st-round pick in 2026 conditional 2nd-round pick in 2025 or 3rd-round pick in 2025	To Vegas Golden Knights Mikhail Vorobyev	
March 8, 2024	To San Jose Sharks David Edstrom; 1st-round pick in 2025	To Vegas Golden Knights Tomas Hertl*; 3rd-round pick in 2025; 3rd-round pick in 2027	

=== Players acquired ===
Date	Player	Former team	Term	Via	Ref
July 1, 2023	Mason Geertsen	New Jersey Devils	2-year	Free agency	
July 1, 2023	Mason Morelli	Hershey Bears (AHL)	2-year	Free agency	
July 1, 2023	Gage Quinney	Henderson Silver Knights (AHL)	2-year	Free agency	
October 7, 2023	Grigori Denisenko	Florida Panthers		Waivers	
January 4, 2024	Tobias Bjornfot	Los Angeles Kings		Waivers	

=== Players lost ===
Date	Player	New team	Term	Via	Ref
July 1, 2023	Teddy Blueger	Vancouver Canucks	1-year	Free agency	
July 1, 2023	Laurent Brossoit	Winnipeg Jets	1-year	Free agency	
July 1, 2023	Connor Corcoran	Bakersfield Condors (AHL)	1-year	Free agency	
July 1, 2023	Jonathan Quick	New York Rangers	1-year	Free agency	
July 4, 2023	Maxim Marushev	Ak Bars Kazan (KHL)	Tryout	Free agency	
July 21, 2023	Spencer Foo	Kunlun Red Star (KHL)	3-year	Free agency	
February 4, 2024	Brayden Pachal	Calgary Flames		Waivers	
February 6, 2024 (Note: Kallionkieli's contract with Kiekko-Espoo was announced ten days before Vegas officially terminated his NHL contract.)	Marcus Kallionkieli	Kiekko–Espoo (Mestis)	1-year	Free agency	
February 16, 2024	Marcus Kallionkieli			Termination	
March 8, 2024	Tobias Bjornfot	Florida Panthers		Waivers	
June 17, 2024	Ivan Morozov	Spartak Moscow (KHL)	2-year‡	Free agency	
Legend: † Contract is entry-level. ‡ Contract begins in 2024–25 season.

=== Signings ===
Date	Player	Term	Ref
June 28, 2023	Ivan Barbashev	5-year	
June 28, 2023	Brayden Pachal	2-year	
June 30, 2023	Adin Hill	2-year	
July 2, 2023	Jiri Patera	1-year	
July 15, 2023	David Edstrom	3-year†	
July 19, 2023	Pavel Dorofeyev	1-year	
July 19, 2023	Brett Howden	2-year	
October 8, 2023	Jakub Demek	3-year†	
November 26, 2023	Ben Hemmerling	3-year†	
November 29, 2023	Jordan Gustafson	3-year†	
December 22, 2023	Ben Hutton	2-year‡	
December 31, 2023	Mathieu Cataford	3-year†	
April 11, 2024	Noah Hanifin	8-year‡	
Legend: † Contract is entry-level. ‡ Contract begins in 2024–25 season.

== Draft picks ==
Below are the Vegas Golden Knights' selections at the 2023 NHL entry draft, which was held on June 28 to 29, 2023, at Bridgestone Arena in Nashville.

Round	#	Player	Pos.	Nationality	Team (League)
1	32	David Edstrom	C	Sweden	Frölunda HC (J20 Nationell)
3	77	Mathieu Cataford	C	Canada	Halifax Mooseheads (QMJHL)
3	96	Arttu Karki	D	Finland	Tappara (U20 SM-sarja)
6	192	Tuomas Uronen	RW	Finland	HIFK (U20 SM-sarja)
