= List of Vegas Golden Knights records =

This is a list of franchise records for the Vegas Golden Knights of the National Hockey League, as of the conclusion of the 2025–26 regular season.

== Individual records ==
=== Skaters ===
Games played
#	Player	GP	Seasons
1	Brayden McNabb	647	2017–present
2	Shea Theodore	581	2017–present
3	William Karlsson	569	2017–present
4	Jonathan Marchessault	514	2017–2024
5	Reilly Smith	489	2017–2023; 2025–2026
Active leader
1	Brayden McNabb	647	2017–present

Goals
#	Player	G	Seasons
1	Jonathan Marchessault	192	2017–2024
2	William Karlsson	165	2017–present
3	Reilly Smith	143	2017–2023; 2025–2026
4	Mark Stone	136	2019–present
5	Jack Eichel	127	2021–present
Active leader
2	William Karlsson	165	2017–present

Assists
#	Player	A	Seasons
1	Shea Theodore	302	2017–present
2	Mark Stone	260	2019–present
3	William Karlsson	238	2017–present
4	Jonathan Marchessault	225	2017–2024
5	Jack Eichel	216	2021–present
Active leader
1	Shea Theodore	302	2017–present

Points
#	Player	Pts	Seasons
1	Jonathan Marchessault	417	2017–2024
2	William Karlsson	403	2017–present
3	Mark Stone	396	2019–present
4	Shea Theodore	385	2017–present
5	Jack Eichel	343	2021–present
Active leader
2	William Karlsson	403	2017–present

Penalty in minutes
#	Player	PIM	Seasons
1	Brayden McNabb	348	2017–present
2	Keegan Kolesar	323	2020–2026
3	Jonathan Marchessault	256	2017–2024
4	Nicolas Hague	235	2019–2025
5	Brett Howden	193	2021–present
Active leader
1	Brayden McNabb	348	2017–present

Power-play goals
#	Player	PPG	Seasons
1	Jonathan Marchessault	42	2017–2024
2	Mark Stone	37	2019–present
3	Pavel Dorofeyev	35	2021–2026
4	William Karlsson	29	2017–present
4	Reilly Smith	29	2017–2023; 2025–2026
Active leader
2	Mark Stone	37	2019–present

Short-handed goals
#	Player	SHG	Seasons
1	William Karlsson	15	2017–present
2	Reilly Smith	13	2017–2023; 2025–2026
3	Chandler Stephenson	7	2019–2024
4	Mark Stone	6	2019–present
5	Cody Eakin	4	2017–2020
Active leader
1	William Karlsson	15	2017–present

Game winning goals
#	Player	GWG	Seasons
1	Jonathan Marchessault	32	2017–2024
2	Mark Stone	27	2019–present
3	William Karlsson	25	2017–present
4	Reilly Smith	24	2017–2023; 2025–2026
5	Chandler Stephenson	20	2019–2024
5	Jack Eichel	20	2021–present
5	Max Pacioretty	20	2018–2022
Active leader
2	Mark Stone	27	2019–present

Highest +/-
#	Player	+/-	Seasons
1	Brayden McNabb	137	2017–present
2	William Karlsson	128	2017–present
3	Mark Stone	112	2019–present
4	Shea Theodore	104	2017–present
5	Reilly Smith	88	2017–2023; 2025–2026
5	Jack Eichel	88	2021–present
Active leader
1	Brayden McNabb	137	2017–present

Points per game (Note: Min. 2 seasons played.)
#	Player	P/G	Seasons
1	Jack Eichel	1.09	2021–present
2	Mark Stone	.99	2019–present
3	Max Pacioretty	.87	2018–2022
4	Jonathan Marchessault	.81	2017–2024
5	Chandler Stephenson	.72	2019–2024
Active leader
1	Jack Eichel	1.09	2021–present

=== Goaltenders ===
Games played
#	Player	GP	Seasons
1	Marc-Andre Fleury	192	2017–2021
2	Adin Hill	139	2022–present
3	Logan Thompson	103	2021–2024
4	Robin Lehner	66	2020–2022
5	Malcolm Subban	63	2017–2020
Active leader
2	Adin Hill	139	2022–present

Wins
1	Marc-Andre Fleury	117	2017–2021
2	Adin Hill	77	2022–present
3	Logan Thompson	56	2021–2024
4	Robin Lehner	39	2020–2022
5	Malcolm Subban	30	2017–2020
Active leader
2	Adin Hill	77	2022–present

Losses
#	Player	L	Seasons
1	Marc-Andre Fleury	60	2017–2021
2	Adin Hill	41	2022–present
3	Logan Thompson	32	2021–2024
4	Robin Lehner	21	2020–2022
4	Malcolm Subban	21	2017–2020
Active leader
2	Adin Hill	41	2022–present

Goals against average (Note: Min. 20 games played)
#	Player	GAA	Seasons
1	Marc-Andre Fleury	2.41	2017–2021
2	Akira Schmid	2.45	2024–2026
3	Robin Lehner	2.61	2020–2022
4	Adin Hill	2.64	2022–present
5	Laurent Brossoit	2.66	2021–2023
Active leader
4	Adin Hill	2.64	2022–present

Save percentage (Note: Min. 20 games played)
#	Player	SV%	Seasons
1	Marc-Andre Fleury	.917	2017–2021
2	Logan Thompson	.912	2021–2024
3	Robin Lehner	.910	2020–2022
4	Laurent Brossoit	.906	2021–2023
5	Adin Hill	.903	2022–present
Active leader
4	Adin Hill	.903	2022–present

Shutouts
#	Player	SO	Seasons
1	Marc-Andre Fleury	23	2017–2021
2	Adin Hill	7	2022–present
3	Logan Thompson	4	2021–2024
4	Robin Lehner	3	2020–2022
5	Ilya Samsonov	2	2024–2025
5	Akira Schmid	2	2024–2026
Active leader
2	Adin Hill	7	2022–present

== Individual playoff records ==
=== Skaters ===
Games played
#	Player	GP	Seasons
1	Shea Theodore	127	2017–present
2	William Karlsson	121	2017–present
3	Brayden McNabb	120	2017–present
4	Reilly Smith	106	2017–2023; 2025–2026
5	Mark Stone	102	2019–present
Active leader
1	Shea Theodore	127	2017–present

Goals
#	Player	G	Seasons
1	Mark Stone	43	2019–present
2	Jonathan Marchessault	36	2017–2024
3	William Karlsson	34	2017–present
4	Brett Howden	23	2021–present
5	Reilly Smith	21	2017–2023; 2025–2026
5	Shea Theodore	21	2017–present
Active leader
1	Mark Stone	43	2019–present

Assists
#	Player	A	Seasons
1	Shea Theodore	62	2017–present
2	Jack Eichel	53	2021–present
3	Reilly Smith	51	2017–2023; 2025–2026
4	William Karlsson	46	2017–present
5	Mark Stone	41	2019–present
Active leader
1	Shea Theodore	62	2017–present

Points
#	Player	Pts	Seasons
1	Mark Stone	84	2019–present
2	Shea Theodore	83	2017–present
3	William Karlsson	80	2017–present
4	Jonathan Marchessault	75	2017–2024
5	Reilly Smith	72	2017–2023; 2025–2026
Active leader
1	Mark Stone	84	2019–present

=== Goaltenders ===
Games played
#	Player	GP	Seasons
1	Marc-Andre Fleury	47	2017–2021
2	Adin Hill	30	2022–present
3	Carter Hart	22	2025–present
4	Robin Lehner	19	2020–2022
5	Laurent Brossoit	8	2021–2023
Active leader
2	Adin Hill	30	2022–present

Wins
1	Marc-Andre Fleury	28	2017–2021
2	Adin Hill	17	2022–present
3	Carter Hart	14	2025–present
4	Robin Lehner	10	2020–2022
5	Laurent Brossoit	5	2021–2023
Active leader
2	Adin Hill	17	2022–present

Goals against average
#	Player	GAA	Seasons
1	Marc-Andre Fleury	2.25	2017–2021
1	Robin Lehner	2.25	2020–2022
3	Logan Thompson	2.35	2021–2024
4	Adin Hill	2.41	2022–present
5	Carter Hart	2.56	2025–present
Active leader
4	Adin Hill	2.41	2022–present

Save percentage
#	Player	SV%	Seasons
1	Logan Thompson	.921	2021–2024
2	Marc-Andre Fleury	.920	2017–2021
3	Adin Hill	.917	2022–present
4	Robin Lehner	.911	2020–2022
5	Carter Hart	.909	2025–present
Active leader
3	Adin Hill	.917	2022–present

Shutouts
#	Player	SO	Seasons
1	Marc-Andre Fleury	6	2017–2021
2	Robin Lehner	4	2020–2022
3	Adin Hill	3	2022–present
Active leader
3	Adin Hill	3	2022–present

== Single season records ==
=== Skaters ===
Goals
#	Player	G	Season
1	William Karlsson	43	2017–18
2	Jonathan Marchessault	42	2023–24
3	Pavel Dorofeyev	37	2025–26
4	Pavel Dorofeyev	35	2024–25
5	Max Pacioretty	32	2019–20
5	Tomas Hertl	32	2024–25

Assists
#	Player	A	Season
1	Jack Eichel	66	2024–25
2	Jack Eichel	63	2025–26
3	Mitch Marner	56	2025–26
4	David Perron	50	2017–18
4	Shea Theodore	50	2024–25

Points
#	Player	P	Season
1	Jack Eichel	94	2024–25
2	Jack Eichel	90	2025–26
3	Mitch Marner	80	2025–26
4	William Karlsson	78	2017–18
5	Jonathan Marchessault	75	2017–18

Points (Defenseman)
#	Player	Pts	Season
1	Shea Theodore	57	2024–25
2	Alex Pietrangelo	54	2022–23
3	Shea Theodore	52	2021–22
4	Shea Theodore	46	2019–20
5	Alex Pietrangelo	44	2021–22

Points (rookie)
#	Player	Pts	Season
1	Alex Tuch	37	2017–18
2	Braeden Bowman	26	2025–26
3	Pavel Dorofeyev	24	2023–24
4	Paul Cotter	18	2022–23
5	Keegan Kolesar	13	2020–21
5	Brendan Leipsic	13	2017–18

Penalties in minutes
#	Player	PIM	Season
1	Jeremy Lauzon	89	2025–26
2	Ryan Reaves	74	2018–19
3	Keegan Kolesar	68	2022–23
3	Keegan Kolesar	68	2021–22
5	Brett Howden	55	2022–23
5	Keegan Kolesar	55	2025–26

Highest +/-
#	Player	+/-	Season
1	William Karlsson	49	2017–18
2	Brayden McNabb	42	2024–25
3	Jonathan Marchessault	36	2017–18
4	Jack Eichel	32	2024–25
5	Reilly Smith	31	2017–18

=== Goaltenders ===
Games played
#	Player	GP	Season
1	Marc-Andre Fleury	61	2018–19
2	Adin Hill	50	2024–25
3	Marc-Andre Fleury	49	2019–20
4	Marc-Andre Fleury	46	2017–18
4	Logan Thompson	46	2023–24

Wins
#	Player	W	Season
1	Marc-Andre Fleury	35	2018–19
2	Adin Hill	32	2024–25
3	Marc-Andre Fleury	29	2017–18
4	Marc-Andre Fleury	27	2019–20
5	Marc-Andre Fleury	26	2020–21

Losses
#	Player	L	Season
1	Marc-Andre Fleury	21	2018–19
2	Robin Lehner	17	2021–22
3	Marc-Andre Fleury	16	2019–20
4	Logan Thompson	14	2023–24
5	Marc-Andre Fleury	13	2017–18
5	Adin Hill	13	2024–25
5	Logan Thompson	13	2022–23

Goals against average
#	Player	GAA	Season
1	Marc-Andre Fleury	1.99	2020–21
2	Marc-Andre Fleury	2.25	2017–18
3	Adin Hill	2.47	2024–25
4	Adin Hill	2.50	2022–23
5	Marc-Andre Fleury	2.51	2018–19

Save percentage
#	Player	SV%	Season
1	Marc-Andre Fleury	.928	2020–21
2	Marc-Andre Fleury	.927	2017–18
3	Logan Thompson	.915	2022–23
4	Adin Hill	.914	2022–23
5	Marc-Andre Fleury	.913	2018–19

Shutouts
#	Player	SO	Season
1	Marc-Andre Fleury	8	2018–19
2	Marc-Andre Fleury	6	2020–21
3	Marc-Andre Fleury	5	2019–20
4	Marc-Andre Fleury	4	2017–18
4	Adin Hill	4	2024–25

== Team records ==
=== Single season ===
Most points	111	2022–23
Most wins	51	2017–18, 2022–23
Most losses	32	2018–19
Most overtime/shootout losses	17	2025–26

=== Streaks ===
Record	Total	Date
Longest winning streak	10 games	April 9–28, 2021
Longest home winning streak	8 games	October 15 – November 24, 2017; October 9 – November 2, 2024
Longest road winning streak	7 games	December 3, 2021 – January 24, 2022; March 9–25, 2023
Longest losing streak	5 games	March 8–15, 2022
Longest home losing streak	5 games	January 21 – February 14, 2019
Longest road losing streak	7 games	March 8–22, 2022
