= 2024 NHL Winter Classic =

Outdoor hockey game in Seattle, Washington

	1	2	3	Total
Vegas Golden Knights	0	0	0	0
Seattle Kraken	1	1	1	3
- Date: January 1, 2024
- Venue: T-Mobile Park
- City: Seattle, Washington, United States
- Attendance: 47,313

The 2024 NHL Winter Classic was a regular season outdoor National Hockey League (NHL) game between the Seattle Kraken and the defending Stanley Cup champion Vegas Golden Knights. The game was played on January 1, 2024, at T-Mobile Park in Seattle, Washington, United States, before a crowd of 47,313 spectators. The Kraken defeated the Golden Knights 3–0 and became the first team to earn a shutout in a Winter Classic.

== Background ==
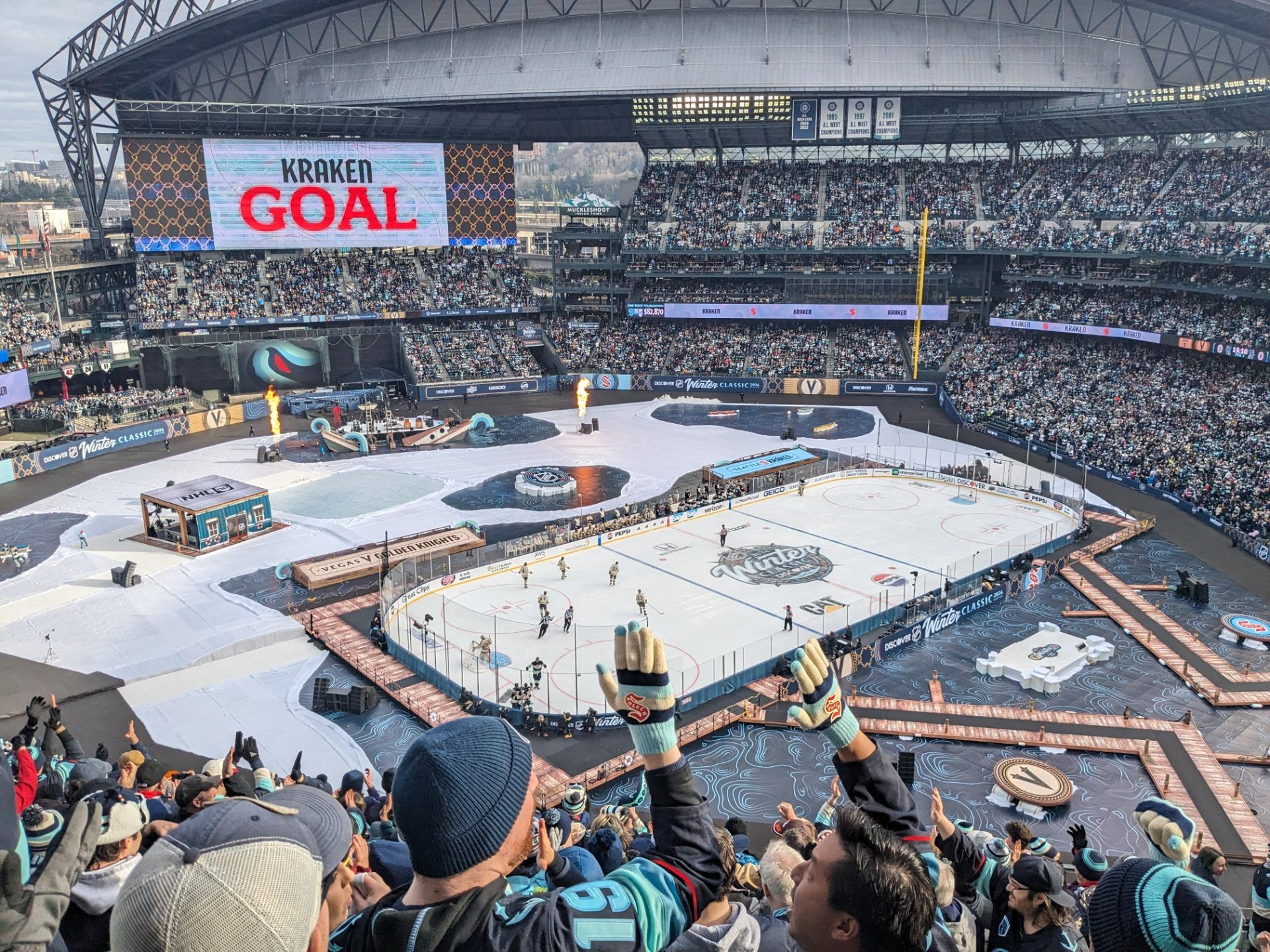
T-Mobile Park during the Winter Classic

The league announced the game on January 2, 2023, before the start of the previous season's Winter Classic. This was the first Winter Classic held in the Pacific Time Zone, as well as Seattle's first outdoor game. Vegas previously appeared in the 2021 NHL Outdoors at Lake Tahoe.

This was also the first Winter Classic to take place in a stadium with a retractable roof. Due to Seattle's rainy climate that may have affected ice conditions, organizers planned on closing T-Mobile Park's retractable roof in case of heavy rainfall. This could have resulted in the first "indoor" Winter Classic, and the first such game since the 2014 Heritage Classic at BC Place in Vancouver. However, on game day, the weather forecast was partly cloudy with a temperature of 44°F and only a 10% chance of rain, and the roof was left open during the game.

The rink was surrounded by decorations in a nautical theme that reflected local heritage and the Kraken mythos; topographic designs were laid on the surface and the walkway between the rink and dugouts resembled docks and piers. A boathouse was used as a broadcast studio. Construction of the rink began in December using a temporary ice plant to pump up to 3,000 US gallons (11,000 L) of glycol to create the rink surface. A two-day fan festival was held on New Year's Eve and New Year's Day in the north parking lot of Lumen Field, located adjacent to T-Mobile Park. The event included a mobile hockey museum and a display of the Stanley Cup.

Both teams' uniforms were leaked to the public four days prior to their official unveiling on November 22, 2023. Players from the NBA's Utah Jazz were spotted wearing the Kraken's Winter Classic uniform inside the Delta Center, while All Elite Wrestling host Renee Paquette wore the Golden Knights' Winter Classic uniform ahead of the promotion's Full Gear pay-per-view. The Golden Knights wore faux-back 1917 vintage white uniforms with heritage gold stripes, gray pants and helmets, featuring a stylized gray "V" crest with petal accents and gold trim. The Kraken wore Seattle Metropolitans-inspired uniforms in the team's current colors, featuring barber-pole stripes in ice blue, vintage white and deep sea blue, and a stylized red "S" modeled after the team's logo.

== Game summary ==
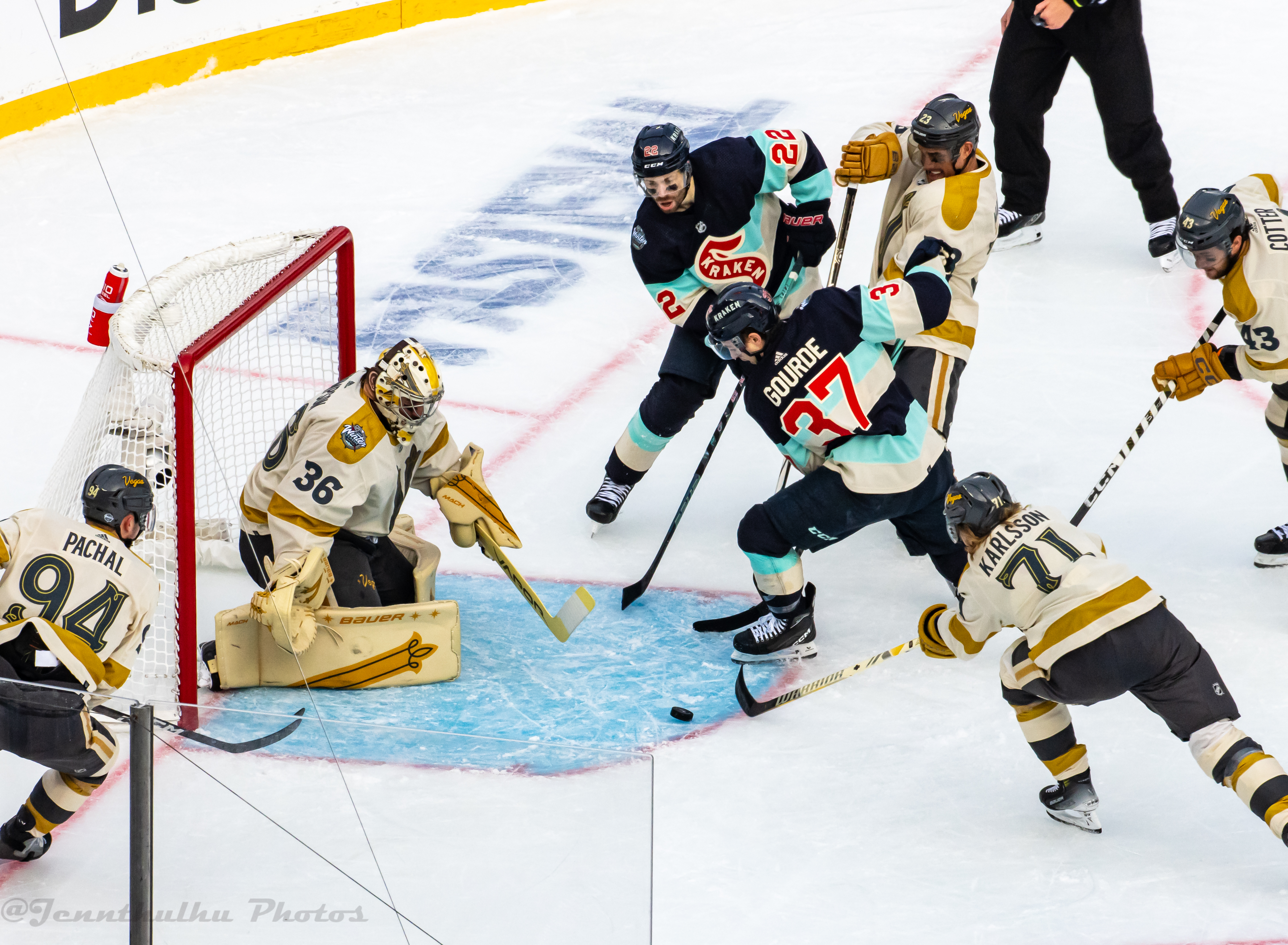
Six players scramble for the puck in front of Vegas goaltender Logan Thompson.

The first period of the game commenced after puck drop at 12:24 p.m. Pacific Time.

April 29	Vegas Golden Knights	0–3	Seattle Kraken	T-Mobile Park	Recap

Scoring summary (Note: Number in parentheses represents the player's total in goals or assists to that point of the season)
Period	Team (Note: SEA – Seattle Kraken, VGK – Vegas Golden Knights)	Goal	Assist(s)	Time	Score
1st	SEA	Eeli Tolvanen (10)	Vince Dunn (25) and Adam Larsson (9)	04:50	1–0 SEA
2nd	SEA	Will Borgen (1)	Tye Kartye (6) and Eeli Tolvanen (13)	02:19	2–0 SEA
3rd	SEA	Yanni Gourde (5)	Unassisted	02:10	3–0 SEA

Penalty summary
Period	Team	Player	Penalty	Time	PIM
1st	None				
2nd	SEA	Adam Larsson	Interference	16:39	2:00
3rd	VGK	Brayden McNabb	Tripping	12:10	2:00
3rd	VGK	Alex Pietrangelo	Tripping	19:54	2:00

Shots by period
Team	1	2	3	Total
VGK	10	10	15	35
SEA	10	11	6	27

Power play opportunities
Team	Goals/Opportunities
VGK	0/1
SEA	0/2

Three star selections
	Team	Player	Statistics
1st	SEA	Joey Daccord	35 saves, 1.000 SV%
2nd	SEA	Eeli Tolvanen	1 goal, 1 assist
3rd	SEA	Yanni Gourde	1 goal

== Team rosters ==
Vegas Golden Knights (Note: 1. – Jersey number, Nat. – Nationality, Pos. – Position (Left wing, Center, Right wing))
#	Nat.	Player	Pos.
2	(Canada)	Zach Whitecloud	D
3	(Canada)	Brayden McNabb	D
7	(Canada)	Alex Pietrangelo (A)	D
9	(United States)	Jack Eichel (A)	C
10	(Canada)	Nicolas Roy	C
14	(Canada)	Nic Hague	D
20	(Canada)	Chandler Stephenson	C
21	(Canada)	Brett Howden	C
22	(Canada)	Michael Amadio	RW
23	(United States)	Alec Martinez	D
28	(Canada)	William Carrier	LW
30	(Czech Republic)	Jiri Patera (Note: Jiri Patera and Chris Driedger dressed as the back-up goaltenders. Neither entered the game.)	G
36	(Canada)	Logan Thompson	G
43	(United States)	Paul Cotter	C
49	(Russia)	Ivan Barbashev	C
55	(Canada)	Keegan Kolesar	RW
61	(Canada)	Mark Stone (C)	RW
71	(Sweden)	William Karlsson	C
81	(Canada)	Jonathan Marchessault	RW
94	(Canada)	Brayden Pachal	D
Head coach: (Canada) Bruce Cassidy

Seattle Kraken
#	Nat.	Player	Pos.
3	(United States)	Will Borgen	D
4	(Canada)	Justin Schultz	D
6	(Sweden)	Adam Larsson (A)	D
7	(Canada)	Jordan Eberle (A)	RW
8	(United States)	Brian Dumoulin	D
10	(United States)	Matty Beniers	C
13	(Canada)	Brandon Tanev	LW
19	(Canada)	Jared McCann	LW
20	(Finland)	Eeli Tolvanen	RW
21	(Sweden)	Alexander Wennberg	C
22	(Denmark)	Oliver Bjorkstrand	RW
24	(Canada)	Jamie Oleksiak	D
29	(Canada)	Vince Dunn	D
35	(United States)	Joey Daccord	G
37	(Canada)	Yanni Gourde	C
52	(Canada)	Tye Kartye	LW
56	(United States)	Kailer Yamamoto	RW
60	(Canada)	Chris Driedger	G
90	(Slovakia)	Tomas Tatar	LW
95	(Sweden)	Andre Burakovsky	LW
Head coach: (Canada) Dave Hakstol

=== Scratches ===
- Vegas Golden Knights: Pavel Dorofeyev, Ben Hutton, Dysin Mayo
- Seattle Kraken: Jaycob Megna, Devin Shore

== Entertainment ==
The American national anthem was performed by 14-year-old guitarist Nikhil Bagga (who has also performed at select Kraken games at Climate Pledge Arena) accompanied by American Sign Language performer Brittany Rupik. Rapper Sir Mix-a-Lot performed during the player introductions while Seattle-based rock band Heart performed during the first intermission.

During the pregame arrival for the teams, the Kraken wore outfits resembling workers from the Pike Place Fish Market, while the Golden Knights wore Elvis Presley costumes. The players were introduced during a ceremony that featured the Fish Market's employees tossing fish over the teams.

== Broadcasting ==
In the United States, the game was televised on TNT, simulcasted on TruTV, and streamed on Max. In Canada, the TNT feed was simulcast on Sportsnet and streamed on Sportsnet+.

The 2024 NHL Winter Classic surpassed the 2022 game for the lowest ratings of any Winter Classic in the United States to date, with an average of 1.1 million American viewers watching the game.
