= Jiří Patera (ice hockey) =

Czech ice hockey player (born 1999)

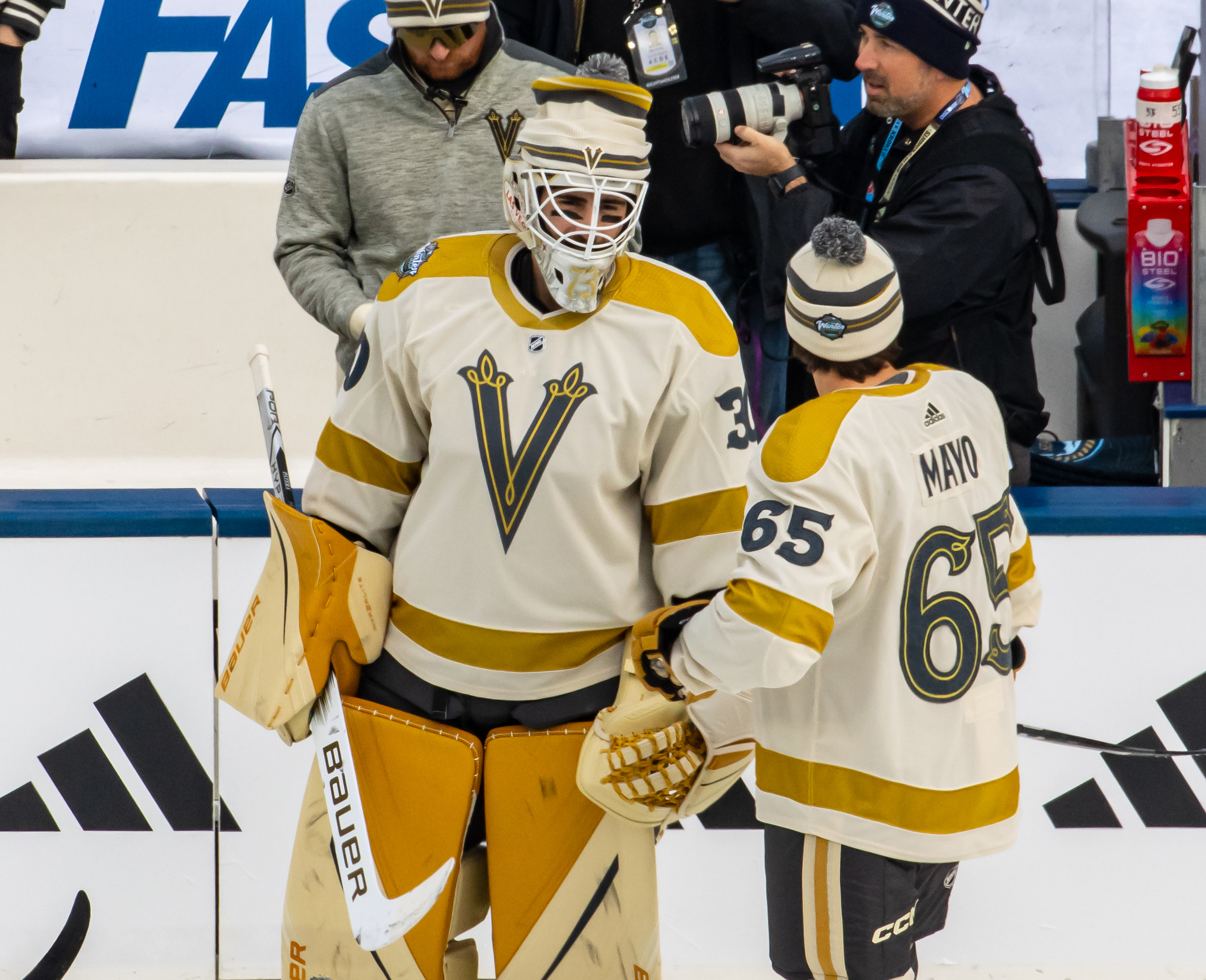
- Patera with the Vegas Golden Knights during the 2024 Winter Classic
- Born: February 24, 1999 (age 27) Prague, Czech Republic
- Height: 6 ft 2 in (188 cm)
- Weight: 209 lb (95 kg; 14 st 13 lb)
- Position: Goaltender
- Catches: Left
- NHL team (P) Cur. team Former teams: Boston Bruins; Providence Bruins (AHL); HC Motor České Budějovice; Vegas Golden Knights; Vancouver Canucks
- NHL draft: 161st overall, 2017; Vegas Golden Knights
- Playing career: 2020–present

Jiří Patera (born February 24, 1999) is a Czech professional ice hockey goaltender for the Providence Bruins of the American Hockey League (AHL), while under contract to the Boston Bruins of the National Hockey League (NHL). He previously played junior in the United States Hockey League (USHL) with the Cedar Rapids RoughRiders and in the Western Hockey League (WHL) with the Brandon Wheat Kings, and was drafted in the sixth round of the 2017 NHL entry draft by the Vegas Golden Knights, with whom he made his NHL debut in 2023.

== Playing career ==
Patera began his career within the youth system of HC Slavia Praha, before joining the system of ČEZ Motor České Budějovice in 2016–17; shortly thereafter, he was selected in the sixth round of the 2017 NHL entry draft by the then-expansion team Vegas Golden Knights.

He entered junior hockey with the United States Hockey League's (USHL) Cedar Rapids RoughRiders in 2017–18, playing 34 games for the club. He then transitioned to the Canadian junior system, joining the Brandon Wheat Kings of the Western Hockey League (WHL) in 2018–19. Patera spent two years in Brandon, posting a career .913 save percentage and 2.95 goals against average over 89 total games played, while being named Eastern Conference Goaltender of the Year for the 2019–20 WHL season.

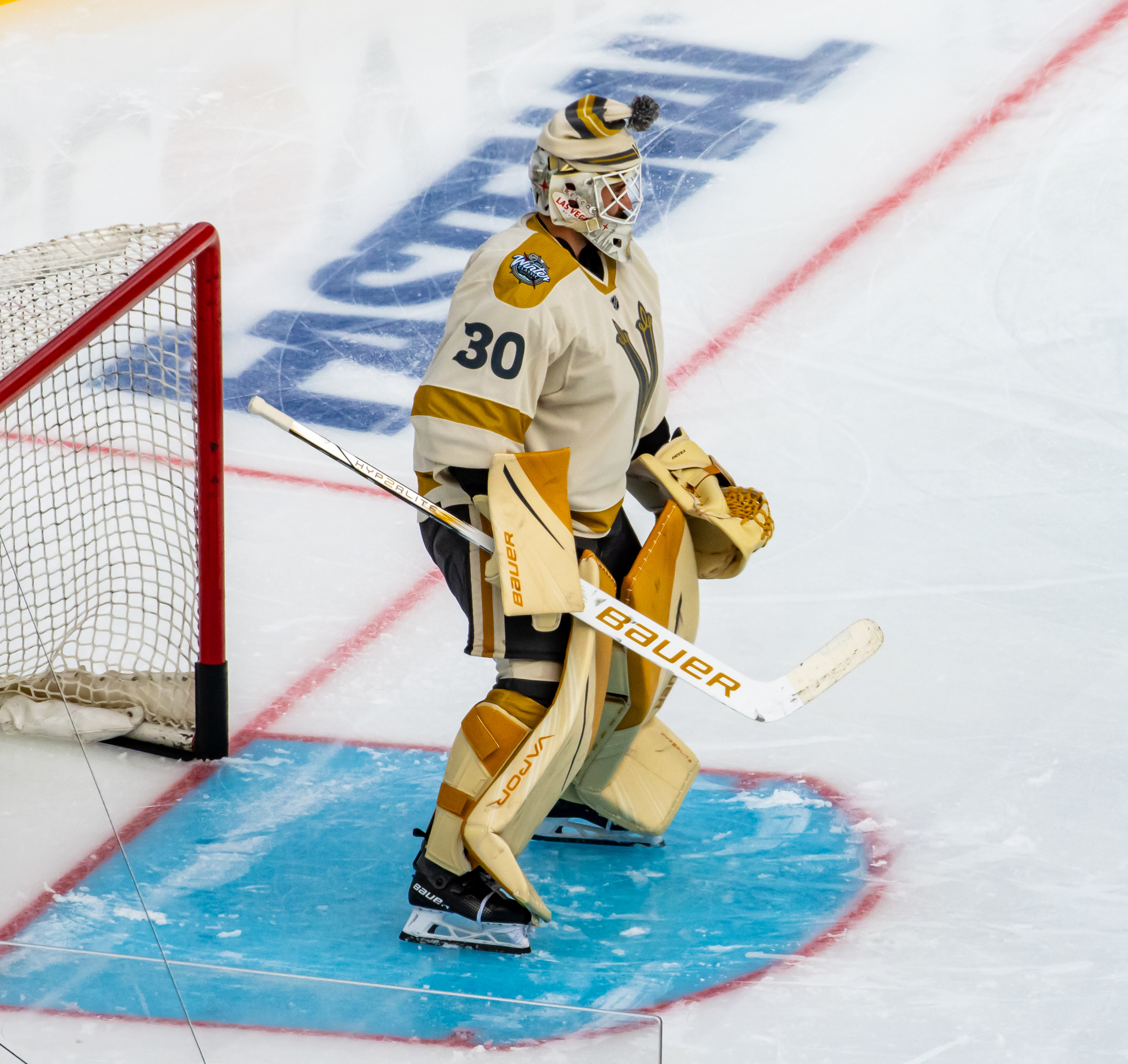
Patera with the Golden Knights during warmups for the 2024 Winter Classic.

Patera signed his three-year entry-level contract with Vegas on 30 June 2020. With the American Hockey League (AHL) season delayed alongside the NHL season due to the COVID-19 pandemic, Patera was loaned to his former Czech club of České Budějovice, where he played 15 games during the 2020–21 Extraliga season. Patera would then join Vegas' AHL affiliate, the Henderson Silver Knights, for the 2020–21 season.

During the 2022–23 season, with the Golden Knights suffering injuries to multiple goaltenders, Patera was recalled from the Silver Knights in March 2023. He then made his NHL debut on 12 March 2023, posting his first career win and saving 30 of 33 shots faced as the Golden Knights defeated the St. Louis Blues 5–3. Despite only playing in two regular-season games, Patera spent the majority of the 2023 playoffs on Vegas' active roster, serving as the third or fourth-string goaltender behind Laurent Brossoit, Adin Hill, and Jonathan Quick; as a result, Patera was subsequently a part of the Golden Knights' eventual Stanley Cup victory.

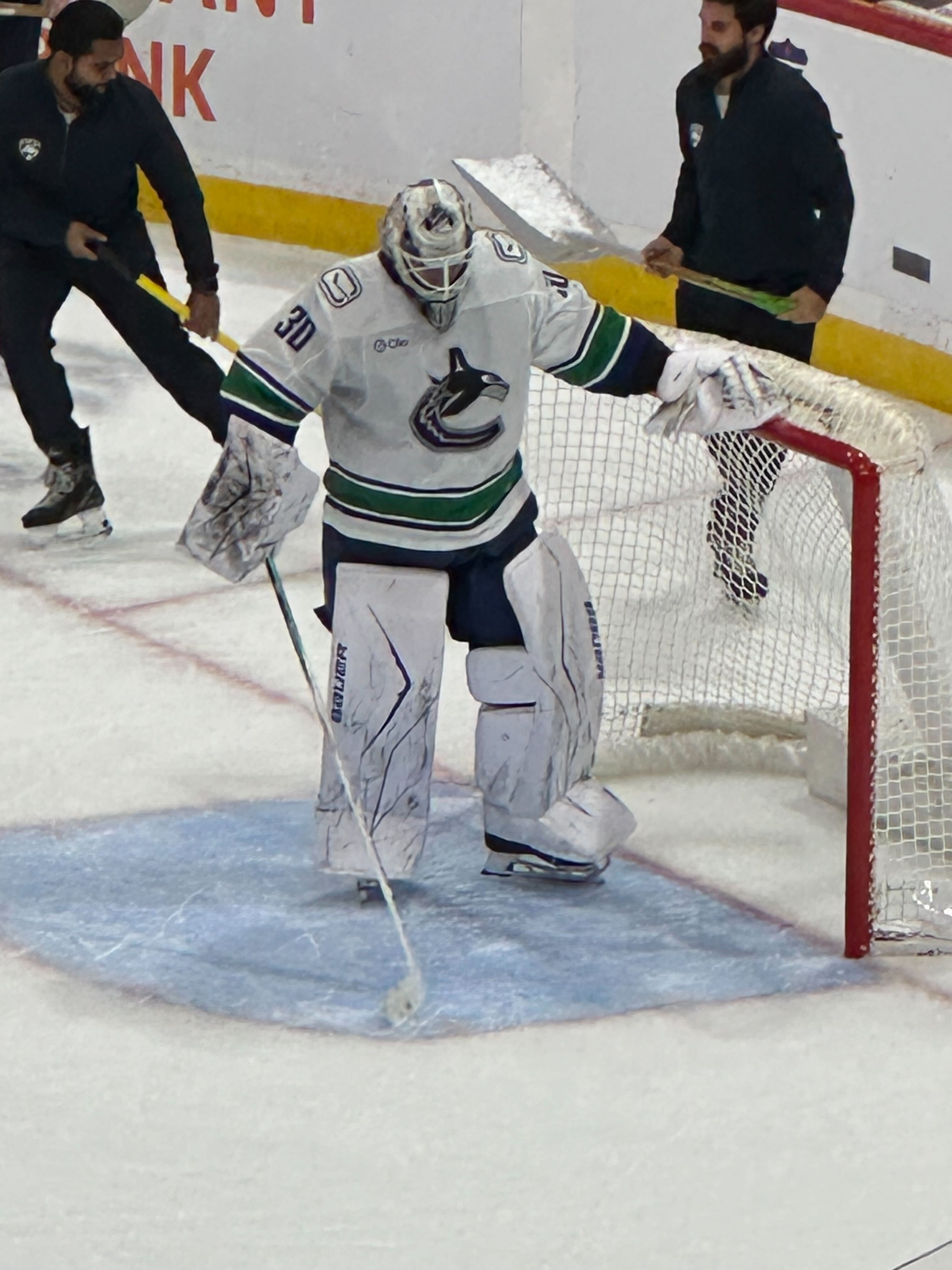
Patera with the Vancouver Canucks in November 2025

As a restricted free agent, Patera signed a one-year extension with Vegas on July 2, 2023. After beginning the season with Henderson, Patera was recalled to the Golden Knights on December 2 due to an injury to Adin Hill. Patera then made his 2023–24 season debut on December 10, stopping 35 of 39 shots in a 5–4 shootout victory over the San Jose Sharks.

As a free agent following the 2023–24 season, Patera signed a two-year, two-way contract with the Vancouver Canucks on July 1, 2024. Three months later, on October 2, Patera was claimed off waivers by the Boston Bruins ahead of the 2024–25 season. However, just four days later, Boston also placed Patera on waivers, and he was subsequently re-claimed by Vancouver on October 7. After missing most of the 2024–25 season due to injury, Patera made his debut for the Canucks over a year later on November 17, 2025, stopping 33 of 40 shots faced in an 8–5 loss to the Florida Panthers.

On July 1, 2026, having left the Canucks as a free agent, Patera made a return to the Boston Bruins organization in agreeing to a one-year, two-way contract for the 2026–27 season.

== International play ==
Patera was named to the Czech under-18 team roster for the 2016 Ivan Hlinka Memorial Tournament, but did not play. Patera would later appear for the under-18 team in three games at the 2017 IIHF World U18 Championships, before joining the Czech Republic for the 2019 IIHF World Junior Championships, appearing in one game.

== Career statistics ==
			Regular season									Playoffs
Season	Team	League	GP	W	L	OTL	MIN	GA	SO	GAA	SV%	GP	W	L	MIN	GA	SO	GAA	SV%
2017–18	Cedar Rapids RoughRiders	USHL	34	13	13	6	1906	103	1	3.24	.901	—	—	—	—	—	—	—	—
2018–19	Brandon Wheat Kings	WHL	48	22	20	5	2774	153	1	3.31	.906	—	—	—	—	—	—	—	—
2019–20	Brandon Wheat Kings	WHL	41	24	12	4	2449	104	5	2.55	.921	—	—	—	—	—	—	—	—
2020–21	HC Motor České Budějovice	ELH	15	2	12	0	759	45	1	3.56	.887	—	—	—	—	—	—	—	—
2020–21	Henderson Silver Knights	AHL	7	2	4	0	322	19	0	3.54	.888	—	—	—	—	—	—	—	—
2021–22	Fort Wayne Komets	ECHL	15	7	5	3	908	42	1	2.77	.906	—	—	—	—	—	—	—	—
2021–22	Henderson Silver Knights	AHL	22	10	11	1	1306	60	1	2.76	.910	2	0	2	116	7	0	3.63	.900
2022–23	Henderson Silver Knights	AHL	31	14	15	1	1782	85	0	2.86	.911	—	—	—	—	—	—	—	—
2022–23	Vegas Golden Knights	NHL	2	2	0	0	120	5	0	2.50	.929	—	—	—	—	—	—	—	—
2023–24	Henderson Silver Knights	AHL	25	11	10	4	1463	73	0	2.99	.903	—	—	—	—	—	—	—	—
2023–24	Vegas Golden Knights	NHL	6	1	3	1	317	21	0	3.98	.893	—	—	—	—	—	—	—	—
2024–25	Abbotsford Canucks	AHL	7	2	2	1	344	16	1	2.79	.899	—	—	—	—	—	—	—	—
2025–26	Abbotsford Canucks	AHL	30	12	14	2	1736	76	1	2.63	.910	—	—	—	—	—	—	—	—
2025–26	Vancouver Canucks	NHL	1	0	1	0	57	7	0	7.39	.825	—	—	—	—	—	—	—	—
ELH totals			15	2	12	0	749	45	1	3.56	.887	—	—	—	—	—	—	—	—
NHL totals			9	3	4	1	494	33	0	4.01	.892	—	—	—	—	—	—	—	—

=== International ===
Year	Team	Event	Result	GP	W	L	T	MIN	GA	SO	GAA	SV%
2016	Czech Republic	IH18	1st place, gold medalist(s)	DNP
2017	Czech Republic	U18	7th	3	0	2	0	142	8	0	3.40	.871
2019	Czech Republic	WJC	7th	1	0	1	0	40	4	0	6.00	.800
Junior totals				4	0	3	0	182	12	0	4.70	.836

== Awards and honours ==
Award	Year
WHL
Eastern Conference Goaltender of the Year	2020
East First All-Star Team	2020
