= Logan Thompson =

Canadian ice hockey player (born 1997)

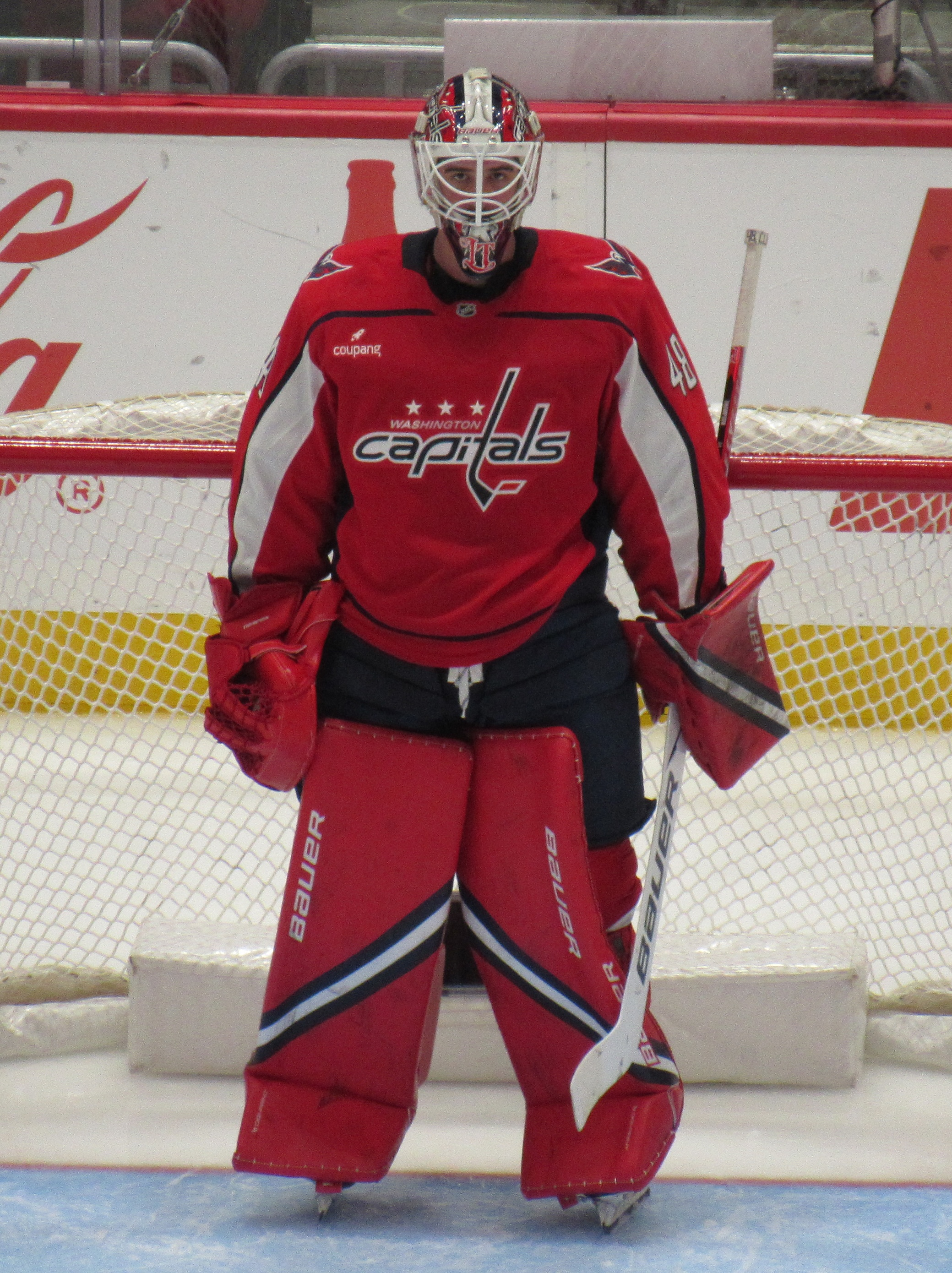
- Thompson with the Washington Capitals in 2026
- Born: February 25, 1997 (age 29) Calgary, Alberta, Canada
- Height: 6 ft 4 in (193 cm)
- Weight: 201 lb (91 kg; 14 st 5 lb)
- Position: Goaltender
- Catches: Right
- NHL team Former teams: Washington Capitals; Vegas Golden Knights
- National team: Canada
- NHL draft: Undrafted
- Playing career: 2019–present

Logan Thompson (born February 25, 1997) is a Canadian professional ice hockey player who is a goaltender for the Washington Capitals of the National Hockey League (NHL). After playing junior hockey in the Western Hockey League (WHL) with the Brandon Wheat Kings, Thompson went undrafted, and spent time in U Sports, the ECHL, and the American Hockey League (AHL) before signing his first NHL contract with the Vegas Golden Knights in 2020. After two years spent primarily with the AHL Henderson Silver Knights, Thompson received significant playing time in the 2021–22 season due to injuries to other Vegas goaltenders, becoming the first former U Sports goaltender to start an NHL game in over 30 years. After taking over as Vegas' starting goaltender for the 2022–23 season, Thompson was named an NHL All-Star in 2023 and won the Stanley Cup with Vegas the same year, despite suffering injuries late in the season. After one further season with Vegas, Thompson was traded to Washington, where he established himself as their starting goaltender and signed a six-year extension. Internationally, Thompson has represented Canada twice, winning silver medals at the 2022 World Championship and 2026 Winter Olympics.

== Playing career ==
=== Junior, university, and minors ===
Thompson began as a goaltender in bantam U15 junior hockey with the Calgary Bisons of the U15 Alberta Midget Hockey League (AMHL), before moving up to the AMHL's midget U18 level with the Calgary Buffalo Hockey Association (CBHA) Blackhawks and Calgary Buffaloes. He split the 2014–15 season between the Grande Prairie Storm of the Alberta Junior Hockey League and the Brandon Wheat Kings of the Western Hockey League, appearing in 22 games for Grande Prairie and four for Brandon.

Thompson spent the next three seasons with Brandon, posting a career .905 save percentage and 3.36 goals against average with a 63–41–10 record, and winning the WHL Championship as a backup in 2016. He then joined the Brock Badgers of U Sports' Ontario University Athletics (OUA) for the 2018–19 season where he majored in sport management. After posting an 18–6–0 record with a .934 save percentage and 2.24 goals against average, Thompson was named to the OUA West Division All-Rookie and First All-Star teams, while winning their Rookie of the Year and Goalie of the Year awards.

After the conclusion of the Badgers' season, Thompson joined the Adirondack Thunder of the ECHL on an amateur tryout contract in March 2019. After being released in April after eight appearances, he signed a professional tryout contract with the Binghamton Devils of the American Hockey League (AHL), but appeared in just one game.

In May 2019, the Hershey Bears of the AHL signed Thompson to a one-year contract. However, he spent the entirety of the 2019–20 season with the Bears' ECHL affiliate, the South Carolina Stingrays.

=== Vegas Golden Knights (2021–2024) ===
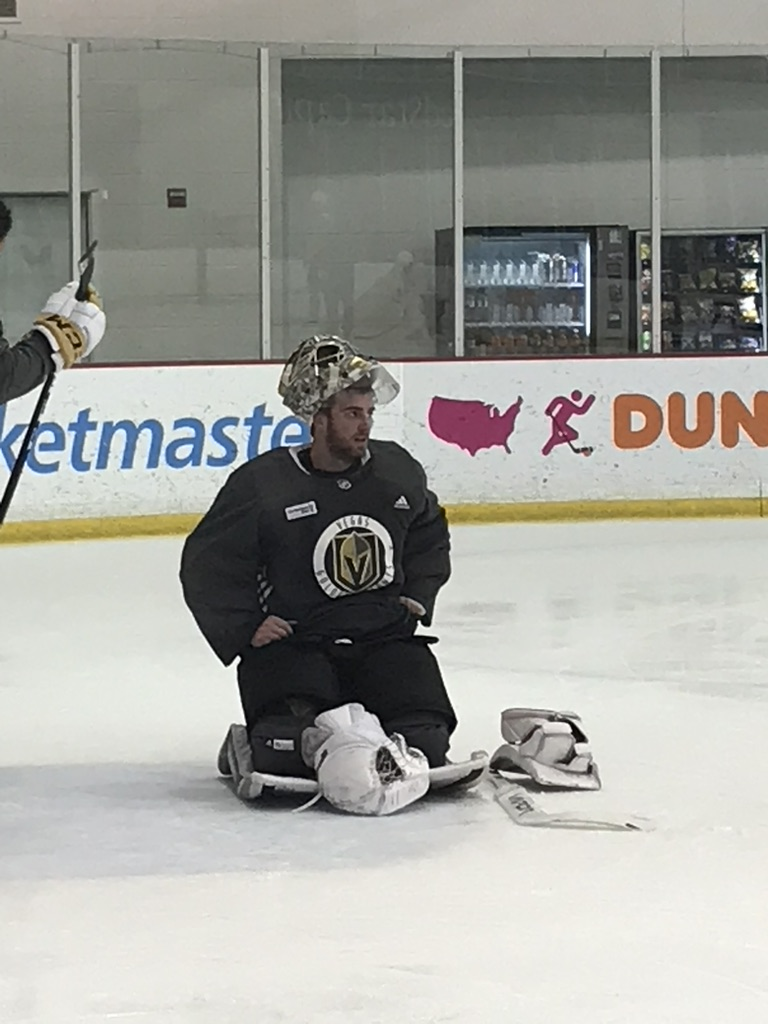
Thompson with the Golden Knights in 2022.

On July 13, 2020, Thompson signed a two-year, entry-level contract with the Vegas Golden Knights of the National Hockey League (NHL). Thompson started the 2020–21 season with the team's American Hockey League (AHL) affiliate, the Henderson Silver Knights, and was named AHL Goaltender of the Month for February 2021. However, he was recalled to the main roster in early March, replacing previous backup Oscar Dansk. On March 11, Thompson made his NHL debut against the Minnesota Wild in relief of Marc-André Fleury, playing eight minutes and stopping both shots he faced in a 4–3 loss. Thompson was then sent back down to Henderson on March 16. Thompson was again named AHL Goaltender of the Month in March, and would ultimately win his first Aldege "Baz" Bastien Memorial Award as the AHL's best goaltender for the 2020–21 AHL season; additionally, Thompson was named to the AHL's All-Rookie and Pacific Division All-Star teams.

Thompson made his first NHL start for Vegas on January 4, 2022, stopping 23 of 26 shots faced in a 3–2 loss to the Nashville Predators; in the process, Thompson became the first former U Sports goaltender to start an NHL game since George Maneluk for the New York Islanders in 1990. On January 30, the Golden Knights re-signed Thompson to a three-year, $2.3 million contract extension. Thompson recorded his first NHL win on February 20, making 35 saves on 36 shots in a 4–1 victory over the San Jose Sharks. He later recorded his first NHL shutout on March 30, stopping all 22 shots against in a 3–0 victory over the Seattle Kraken.

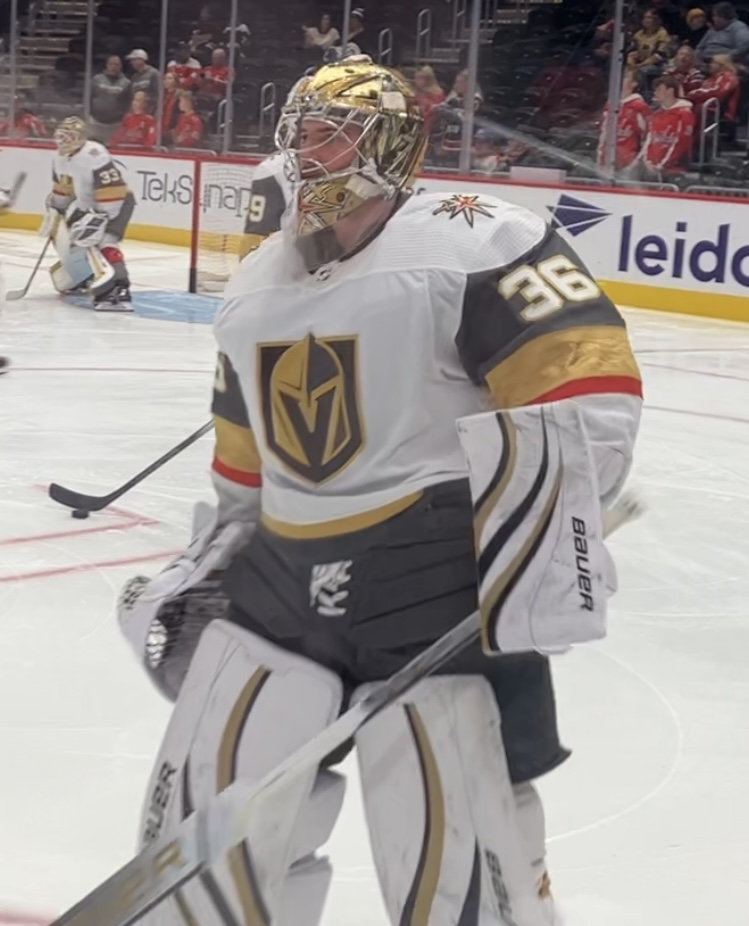
Thompson with the Golden Knights in 2023

Due to injuries to starting goaltender Robin Lehner and backup Laurent Brossoit, Thompson was named the Golden Knights' starting goaltender entering the 2022–23 season, leading the team to a 4–3 victory over the Los Angeles Kings in the season opener on October 11, 2022. Thompson then recorded his first shutout of the season on October 13, stopping 27 shots as the Golden Knights defeated the Chicago Blackhawks 1–0. Thompson was named NHL Rookie of the Month for November after winning eight of 10 appearances during the month. Subsequently, he was named to his first NHL All-Star Game in January 2023, serving as one of the Pacific Division's goaltenders in the 2023 contest; Thompson also became the first rookie goaltender to be named to the All-Star Game since John Gibson in 2016. Similarly owing to his strong start, Thompson was initially considered a contender for the Calder Memorial Trophy as the NHL's best rookie.

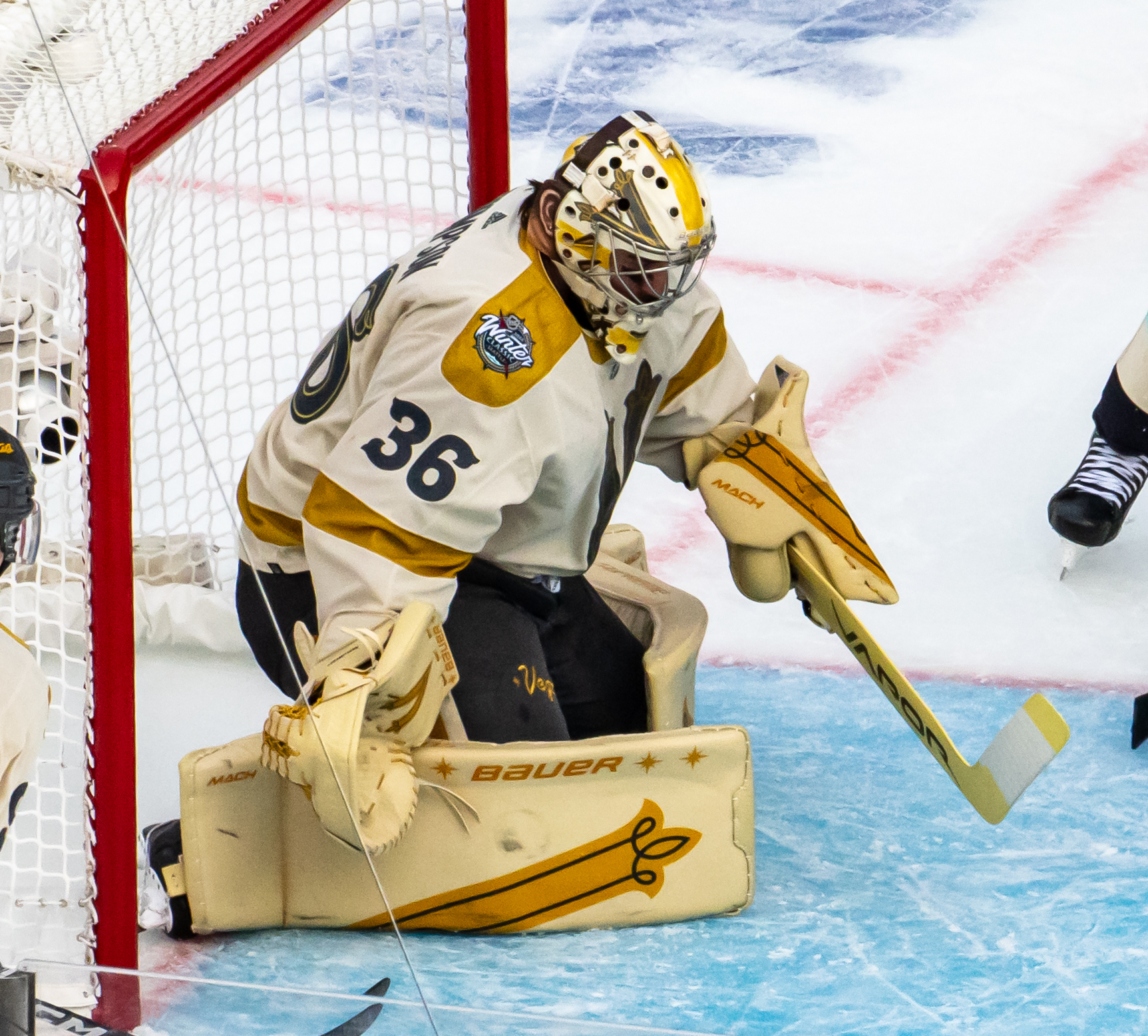
Thompson in net for the Golden Knights during the 2024 Winter Classic

Thompson's rookie year was then cut short just after the All-Star Break, as he left early in a 5–1 victory over the Minnesota Wild on February 9, after suffering a lower-body injury. After missing the majority of February and March, Thompson would ultimately return for one start against the Calgary Flames on March 23; however, he again suffered a lower-body injury, and left in the third period, subsequently missing the remainder of the regular season. In his absence, the Golden Knights variously relied on Brossoit, Adin Hill, fellow rookie Jiří Patera, and the newly-acquired Jonathan Quick. Thompson shared in the Golden Knights' eventual Stanley Cup victory, despite not being able to participate in the playoffs, and his name was engraved on the Stanley Cup alongside the rest of the team.

The 2023–24 season saw Hill and Thompson working as a tandem, splitting starts over the first month of the season. However, after Hill suffered two lower-body injuries in November and December, Thompson once again assumed the starting role. While appearing in 10 games during December, Thompson saw a decline in play, being removed against the Carolina Hurricanes on December 19, 2023, after allowing six goals, and culminating in a 5–2 loss to the Anaheim Ducks on December 27, in which he allowed four goals in the first period. Additionally, like Hill, he suffered an injury mid-month, briefly ceding the starting role to Jiří Patera. After a 3–2 victory over the Los Angeles Kings on December 28, Thompson started the 2024 Winter Classic for the Golden Knights on January 1, 2024, culminating in a 3–0 defeat to the Seattle Kraken.

Following the Winter Classic, however, Thompson improved; after recording a 1.34 goals against average and .956 save percentage with a 3–0–0 record during a mid-month homestand, Thompson was named the league's Third Star of the Week, alongside Kirill Kaprizov and David Pastrňák. The remainder of the season saw up-and-down play from Thompson, with several poor starts in February, including a seven-goal loss to the Buffalo Sabres, followed by a stretch of five consecutive starts with one goal against. This stretch resulted in another Star of the Week award, being named the Second Star alongside Connor McDavid and Alexis Lafrenière. After playing his 100th career game on April 5, 2024, Thompson was named the Golden Knights' playoff starter. Though he won his first two playoff starts against the Dallas Stars on April 22 and 24, Thompson then lost two consecutive games, despite recording a career-high 43 saves in game three; he was subsequently replaced by Hill for game 5, and Vegas ultimately lost the series in seven games.

=== Washington Capitals (2024–present) ===
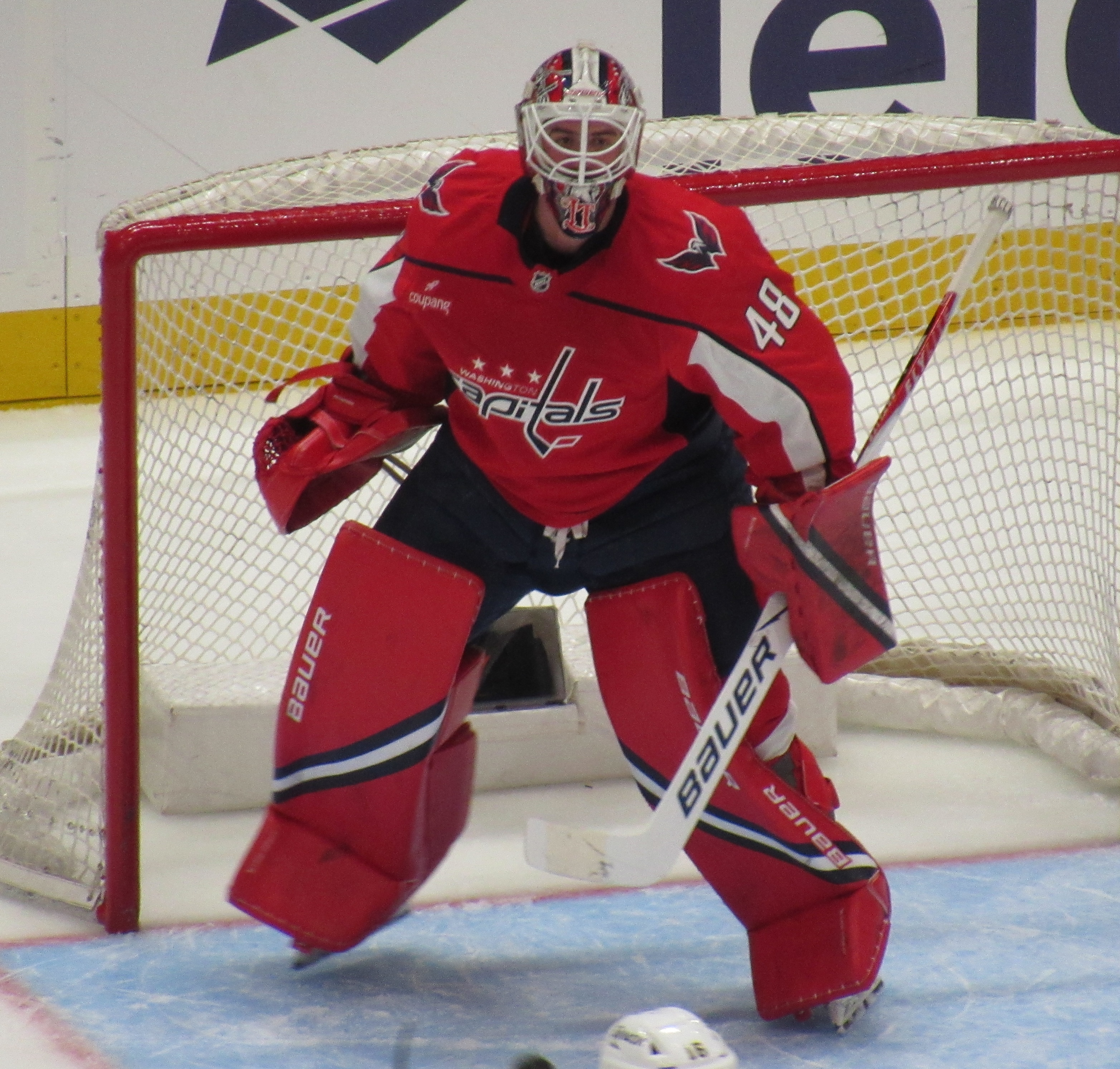
Thompson with the Capitals during a game against the Golden Knights in February 2026

Following the end of the season, Thompson requested a trade from Vegas; the team's general manager, Kelly McCrimmon, had made it clear that Hill would be the starter going forward and Thompson felt he could do the same elsewhere. Subsequently, on June 29, the Golden Knights traded Thompson during the 2024 NHL entry draft to the Washington Capitals in exchange for two third-round picks. Thompson began the season sharing goaltending duties with Charlie Lindgren. On January 27, 2025, Thompson agreed to a six-year contract extension with the Capitals worth $35.1 million. Up to that point, Thompson had recorded exceptional numbers for the Capitals, boasting a 22–2–3 record, a 2.09 goals-against average, and a .925 save percentage, including two shutouts. Although he cooled slightly as the season went on, he would eventually backstop the Capitals to the best record in the Eastern Conference standings that season, one year removed from the team having qualified for the playoffs via a tiebreaker.

== International play ==
Medal record

Representing Canada

Men's ice hockey

Winter Olympics
Silver medal – second place	2026 Milano Cortina	

World Championships
Silver medal – second place	2022 Finland	

Thompson was named to the Canadian national team for the 2022 IIHF World Championship. After entering the tournament as Canada's starting goaltender and appearing in four games, Thompson suffered an injury and ceded starting duties to Chris Driedger. Thompson ultimately won a silver medal, as Canada lost the tournament finals to Finland in overtime.

On December 31, 2025, he was named to Canada's roster to compete at the 2026 Winter Olympics. Thompson started one game during the group stage, stopping 24 of 25 shots in a 5–1 win over Switzerland.

== Career statistics ==
=== Regular season and playoffs ===
			Regular season									Playoffs
Season	Team	League	GP	W	L	OTL	MIN	GA	SO	GAA	SV%	GP	W	L	MIN	GA	SO	GAA	SV%
2014–15	Grande Prairie Storm	AJHL	22	4	11	5	1,242	70	1	3.38	.906	—	—	—	—	—	—	—	—
2014–15	Brandon Wheat Kings	WHL	4	3	1	0	240	19	0	4.74	.846	—	—	—	—	—	—	—	—
2015–16	Brandon Wheat Kings	WHL	23	17	1	0	1,231	54	0	2.63	.898	1	0	0	—	—	—	2.65	.920
2016–17	Brandon Wheat Kings	WHL	40	14	17	2	2,299	124	1	3.24	.908	4	0	4	—	—	—	4.96	.902
2017–18	Brandon Wheat Kings	WHL	55	29	22	2	3,165	180	3	3.41	.908	2	0	2	—	—	—	8.30	.765
2018–19	Brock Badgers	OUA	24	18	6	0	1,456	54	3	2.22	.934	5	3	2	—	—	—	2.82	.915
2018–19	Adirondack Thunder	ECHL	8	2	4	1	463	21	0	2.72	.918	—	—	—	—	—	—	—	—
2018–19	Binghamton Devils	AHL	1	0	1	0	60	5	0	5.03	.815	—	—	—	—	—	—	—	—
2019–20	South Carolina Stingrays	ECHL	32	23	8	1	1,922	72	3	2.25	.929	—	—	—	—	—	—	—	—
2020–21	Henderson Silver Knights	AHL	23	16	6	2	1,350	44	2	1.96	.943	5	3	2	309	12	0	2.33	.919
2020–21	Vegas Golden Knights	NHL	1	0	0	0	9	0	0	0.00	1.000	—	—	—	—	—	—	—	—
2021–22	Henderson Silver Knights	AHL	26	13	9	4	1,492	69	2	2.77	.920	—	—	—	—	—	—	—	—
2021–22	Vegas Golden Knights	NHL	19	10	5	3	1,098	49	1	2.68	.914	—	—	—	—	—	—	—	—
2022–23	Vegas Golden Knights	NHL	37	21	13	3	2,172	96	2	2.65	.915	—	—	—	—	—	—	—	—
2023–24	Vegas Golden Knights	NHL	46	25	14	5	2,645	119	1	2.70	.908	4	2	2	255	10	0	2.35	.921
2024–25	Washington Capitals	NHL	43	31	6	6	2,535	105	2	2.49	.910	10	5	5	597	24	0	2.41	.917
2025–26	Washington Capitals	NHL	58	31	21	6	3,445	140	4	2.44	.912	—	—	—	—	—	—	—	—
NHL totals			204	118	59	23	11,903	509	10	2.57	.912	14	7	7	852	34	0	2.40	.918

=== International ===
Year	Team	Event	Result	GP	W	L	OT	MIN	GA	SO	GAA	SV%
2022	Canada	WC	2nd place, silver medalist(s)	4	3	1	0	239	12	0	3.00	.881
2026	Canada	OG	2nd place, silver medalist(s)	1	1	0	0	60	1	0	1.00	.960
Senior totals				5	4	1	0	299	13	0	2.61	.896

== Awards and honours ==
Award	Year	Ref
WHL
Ed Chynoweth Cup champion	2016	
WHL East Second All-Star Team	2018	
U Sports – OUA West
All-Rookie Team	2019	
First All-Star Team	2019	
Goaltender of the Year	2019	
Rookie of the Year	2019	
AHL
AHL All-Rookie Team	2021	
AHL Pacific Division All-Star Team	2021	
Aldege "Baz" Bastien Memorial Award	2021	
NHL
Second All-Star team	2026	
NHL All-Star Game	2023	
Stanley Cup champion	2023	

Awards and achievements
Preceded by Kaapo Kähkönen	Aldege "Baz" Bastien Memorial Award; 2020–21	Succeeded by Dustin Wolf
