= Adin Hill =

Canadian ice hockey player (born 1996)

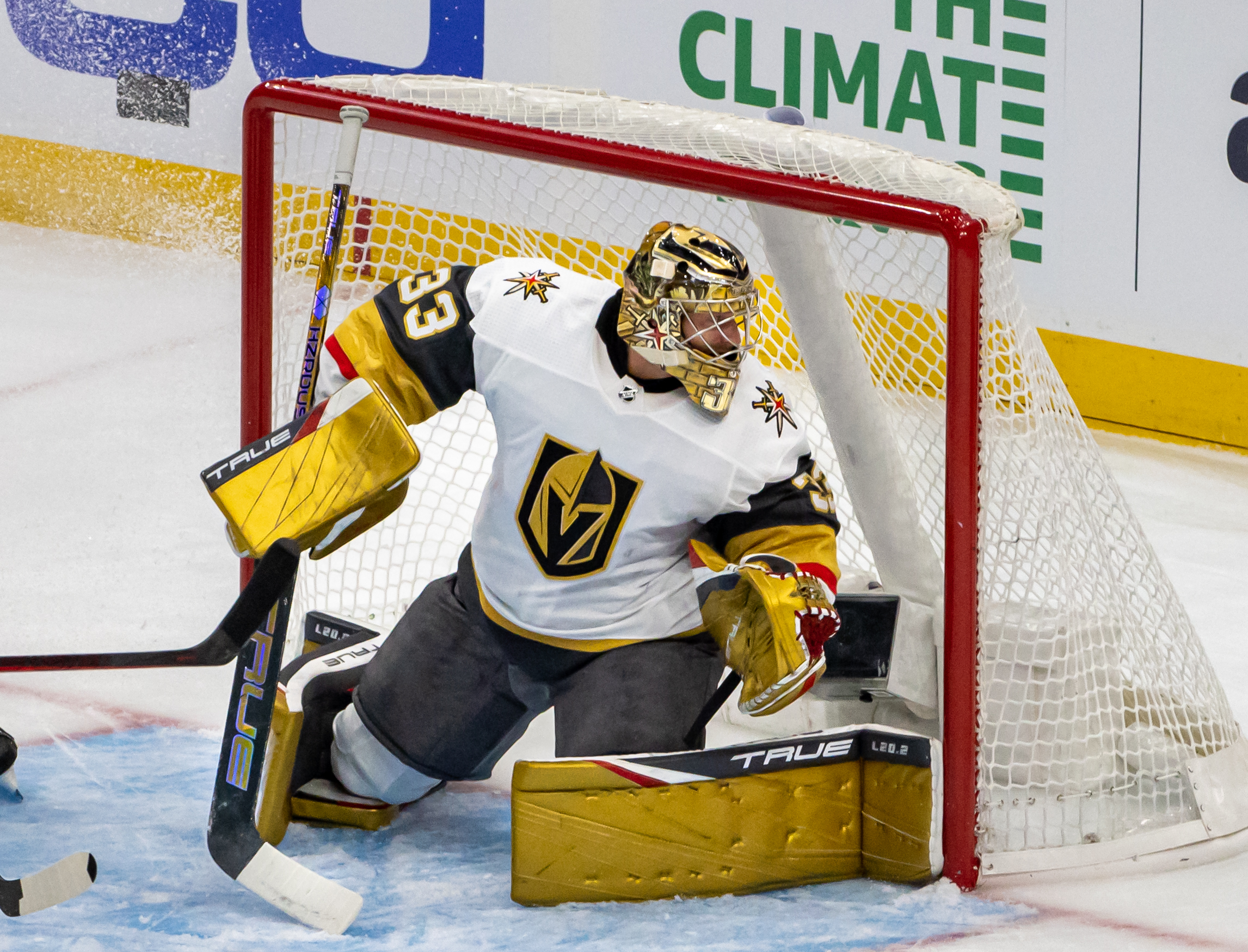
- Hill with the Vegas Golden Knights in 2022
- Born: May 11, 1996 (age 30) Comox, British Columbia, Canada
- Height: 6 ft 4 in (193 cm)
- Weight: 222 lb (101 kg; 15 st 12 lb)
- Position: Goaltender
- Catches: Left
- NHL team Former teams: Vegas Golden Knights; Arizona Coyotes; San Jose Sharks
- National team: Canada
- NHL draft: 76th overall, 2015; Arizona Coyotes
- Playing career: 2016–present

Adin Hill (born May 11, 1996) is a Canadian professional ice hockey player who is a goaltender for the Vegas Golden Knights of the National Hockey League (NHL). Hill was selected by the Arizona Coyotes, 76th overall, in the 2015 NHL entry draft. He has also played with the San Jose Sharks. As their starting goaltender, Hill won the Stanley Cup with the Golden Knights in 2023.

== Playing career ==
=== Junior ===
Hill played bantam junior hockey with the Calgary Bisons before later developing at the midget level with the Calgary Buffaloes in the Alberta Midget Hockey League. He spent the duration of the 2013–14 season with the Calgary Canucks in the Alberta Junior Hockey League before ending the season playing four games of major junior hockey with the Portland Winterhawks of the Western Hockey League.

He spent the entirety of the 2014–15 season with the Winterhawks, where he had a 31–11–1 record and a league-best .921 save percentage. At season's end, he was selected in the third round, 76th overall, by the Arizona Coyotes in the 2015 NHL entry draft.

=== Arizona Coyotes (2016–2021) ===
On April 6, 2016, the Coyotes signed Hill to a three-year, entry-level contract. He played for two of the Coyotes' affiliates during the 2016–17 season (the Tucson Roadrunners of the American Hockey League (AHL) and the Rapid City Rush of the ECHL).

Hill began the 2017–18 season with the Roadrunners. However, he was recalled by the Coyotes on October 16, 2017. On October 17, he made his NHL debut, stopping 31 shots in a 3–1 loss to the Dallas Stars. The debut also made him the first goaltender selected in the 2015 draft to appear in an NHL game. On March 13, 2018, Hill recorded his first career win in a 4–3 shootout victory over the Los Angeles Kings. He finished the season with four appearances for the club.

Hill once again began the 2018–19 season with the Roadrunners. He was recalled by the Coyotes on November 24. Hill was named the NHL Second Star of the week for the week of December 3 after posting a 3–0–0 record.

On August 3, 2019, the Coyotes re-signed Hill to a one-year, two-way contract extension. He made 13 appearances during the 2019–20 season, going 2–4–3.

On September 15, 2020, Hill signed a one-year extension with the Coyotes. In the pandemic-delayed 2020–21 season, with injuries to veteran netminders Darcy Kuemper and Antti Raanta, Hill appeared in 19 games for Arizona, earning a 9–9–1 record with a .913 save percentage (SV%) and 2.74 goals-against average (GAA) along with two shutouts. Hill co-led Arizona goaltenders in shutouts and led in save percentage and set a career-high in games played.

=== San Jose Sharks (2021–2022) ===
On July 17, 2021, due to expansion draft considerations, Hill was traded by the Coyotes, along with a seventh-round pick to the Sharks in exchange for Josef Kořenář and a second-round pick in the 2022 NHL entry draft. He signed a two-year contract with the Sharks on August 4, 2021. On November 9, 2021, he recorded a two-assist game in a 4–1 win over the Calgary Flames.

=== Vegas Golden Knights (2023–present) ===
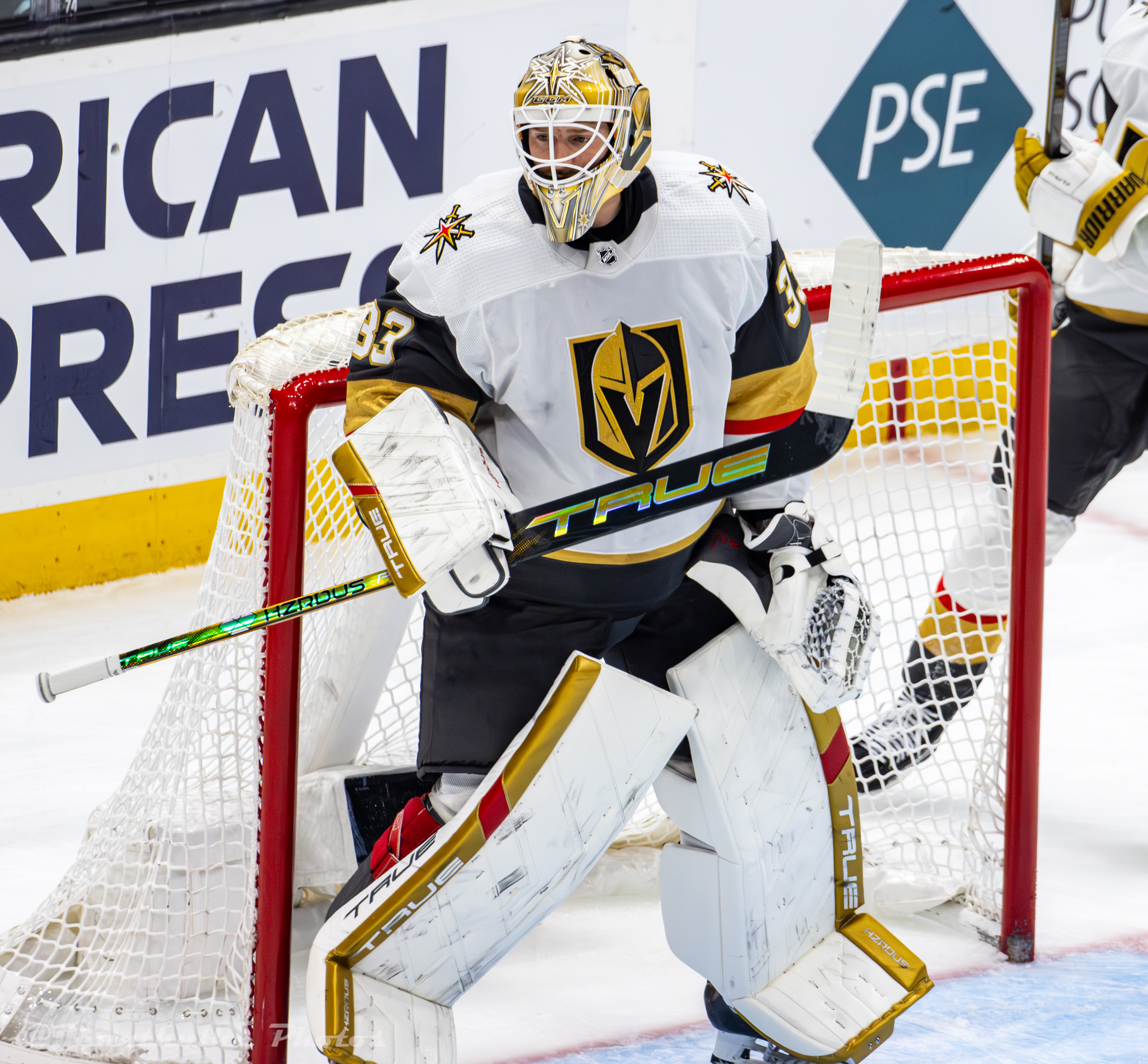
Hill with the Vegas Golden Knights in 2024.

Hill was traded to the Vegas Golden Knights on August 29, 2022, in exchange for a fourth-round pick in 2024. The Golden Knights initially acquired Hill to serve as a backup to Logan Thompson, after the team's established starting goaltender Robin Lehner would miss the entire season and backup Laurent Brossoit required hip surgery that would see him miss the opening months of the 2022–23 season. The team's goaltending situation continued to be complicated by injuries over the course of the season, with Thompson departing the lineup as a result, and Hill himself also missing time toward the end of the season, while Brossoit returned to the roster and the Golden Knights also acquired former Los Angeles Kings starter Jonathan Quick for additional depth at the position. Hill finished the regular season with a 16–7–1 record and a .915 save percentage.

The Golden Knights entered the 2023 Stanley Cup playoffs as the top seed in the Western Conference, with Brossoit the team's starting goaltender and Hill as backup. However, in game three of the Knights' second round series against the Edmonton Oilers, Brossoit injured himself while making a save, necessitating Hill taking over the net. He proceeded to lead the team to victory over the Oilers, reaching the Western Conference final against the Dallas Stars. Hill allowed only twelve goals in the six-game series against Dallas, including two shutouts. The Golden Knights reached the 2023 Stanley Cup Final against the Florida Panthers, with Hill drawing notice for a paddle save in the series opener that was dubbed "the save of the playoffs" by the Associated Press. The Golden Knights defeated the Panthers in five games, winning the Stanley Cup, with Hill observing "you dream about it every day growing up as a child." Hill finished third in voting for the Conn Smythe Trophy as playoff MVP, behind teammates Jonathan Marchessault and Jack Eichel.

Following the season, Hill elected to avoid free agency and signed a two-year, $9.8 million extension to stay with the Golden Knights. Hill signed a further six-year extension with Vegas on March 14, 2025, keeping him in Vegas through the 2030–31 season. In his fifth game of the 2025–26 season, on October 18, 2025, Hill suffered a lower-body injury midway through a game against the Calgary Flames, and subsequently missed the next three months of the season. He returned on January 15, 2026, stopping 23 of 28 shots in a 6–5 overtime victory over the Toronto Maple Leafs.

== International play ==
Medal record

Representing Canada

Ice hockey

World Championships
Gold medal – first place	2021 Latvia	

4 Nations Face-Off
Winner	2025 Canada/United States	

Hill represented Canada at the 2021 IIHF World Championship where he appeared in three games and recorded one win and one loss, with a 1.73 GAA and won a gold medal.

== Career statistics ==
=== Regular season and playoffs ===
			Regular season									Playoffs
Season	Team	League	GP	W	L	OT	MIN	GA	SO	GAA	SV%	GP	W	L	MIN	GA	SO	GAA	SV%
2013–14	Calgary Canucks	AJHL	19	2	14	1	1,041	68	0	3.92	.897	—	—	—	—	—	—	—	—
2013–14	Portland Winterhawks	WHL	4	4	0	0	218	6	0	1.65	.934	—	—	—	—	—	—	—	—
2014–15	Portland Winterhawks	WHL	46	31	11	1	2,604	122	2	2.81	.921	17	10	7	1,074	53	1	2.96	.911
2015–16	Portland Winterhawks	WHL	65	32	27	6	3,897	192	3	2.96	.917	4	0	4	234	14	0	3.58	.904
2015–16	Springfield Falcons	AHL	4	1	3	0	236	12	0	3.05	.905	—	—	—	—	—	—	—	—
2016–17	Rapid City Rush	ECHL	5	1	3	1	301	18	1	3.59	.890	—	—	—	—	—	—	—	—
2016–17	Tucson Roadrunners	AHL	40	16	14	6	2,243	118	1	3.16	.906	—	—	—	—	—	—	—	—
2017–18	Tucson Roadrunners	AHL	36	19	11	4	1,950	74	5	2.28	.914	9	4	5	566	20	2	2.12	.922
2017–18	Arizona Coyotes	NHL	4	1	3	0	241	14	0	3.49	.891	—	—	—	—	—	—	—	—
2018–19	Tucson Roadrunners	AHL	36	16	15	4	2,043	89	2	2.61	.906	—	—	—	—	—	—	—	—
2018–19	Arizona Coyotes	NHL	13	7	5	0	697	32	1	2.76	.901	—	—	—	—	—	—	—	—
2019–20	Tucson Roadrunners	AHL	20	15	5	0	1,199	48	2	2.40	.918	—	—	—	—	—	—	—	—
2019–20	Arizona Coyotes	NHL	13	2	4	3	641	28	0	2.62	.918	—	—	—	—	—	—	—	—
2020–21	Arizona Coyotes	NHL	19	9	9	1	1,006	46	2	2.74	.913	—	—	—	—	—	—	—	—
2020–21	Tucson Roadrunners	AHL	2	0	2	0	116	8	0	4.13	.864	—	—	—	—	—	—	—	—
2021–22	San Jose Sharks	NHL	25	10	11	1	1,376	61	2	2.66	.906	—	—	—	—	—	—	—	—
2021–22	San Jose Barracuda	AHL	1	0	1	0	59	3	0	3.06	.917	—	—	—	—	—	—	—	—
2022–23	Henderson Silver Knights	AHL	1	1	0	0	40	3	0	4.50	.857	—	—	—	—	—	—	—	—
2022–23	Vegas Golden Knights	NHL	27	16	7	1	1,491	62	0	2.50	.915	16	11	4	914	33	2	2.17	.932
2023–24	Vegas Golden Knights	NHL	35	19	12	2	1,969	89	2	2.71	.909	3	1	2	176	5	1	1.70	.931
2024–25	Vegas Golden Knights	NHL	50	32	13	5	2,940	121	4	2.47	.906	11	5	6	677	33	0	2.93	.887
2025–26	Vegas Golden Knights	NHL	27	10	9	6	1,498	76	1	3.04	.871	—	—	—	—	—	—	—	—
NHL totals			213	106	73	19	11,857	528	12	2.68	.905	30	17	12	1,766	71	3	2.41	.917

=== International ===
Year	Team	Event	Result	GP	W	L	OT	MIN	GA	SO	GAA	SV%
2021	Canada	WC	1st place, gold medalist(s)	3	1	1	0	138	4	0	1.73	.909
2025	Canada	4NF	1st place, gold medalist(s)	—	—	—	—	—	—	—	—	—
Senior totals				3	1	1	0	138	4	0	1.73	.909

== Awards and honours ==
Award	Year	Ref
NHL
Stanley Cup champion	2023	
