= Jonathan Marchessault =

Canadian ice hockey player (born 1990)

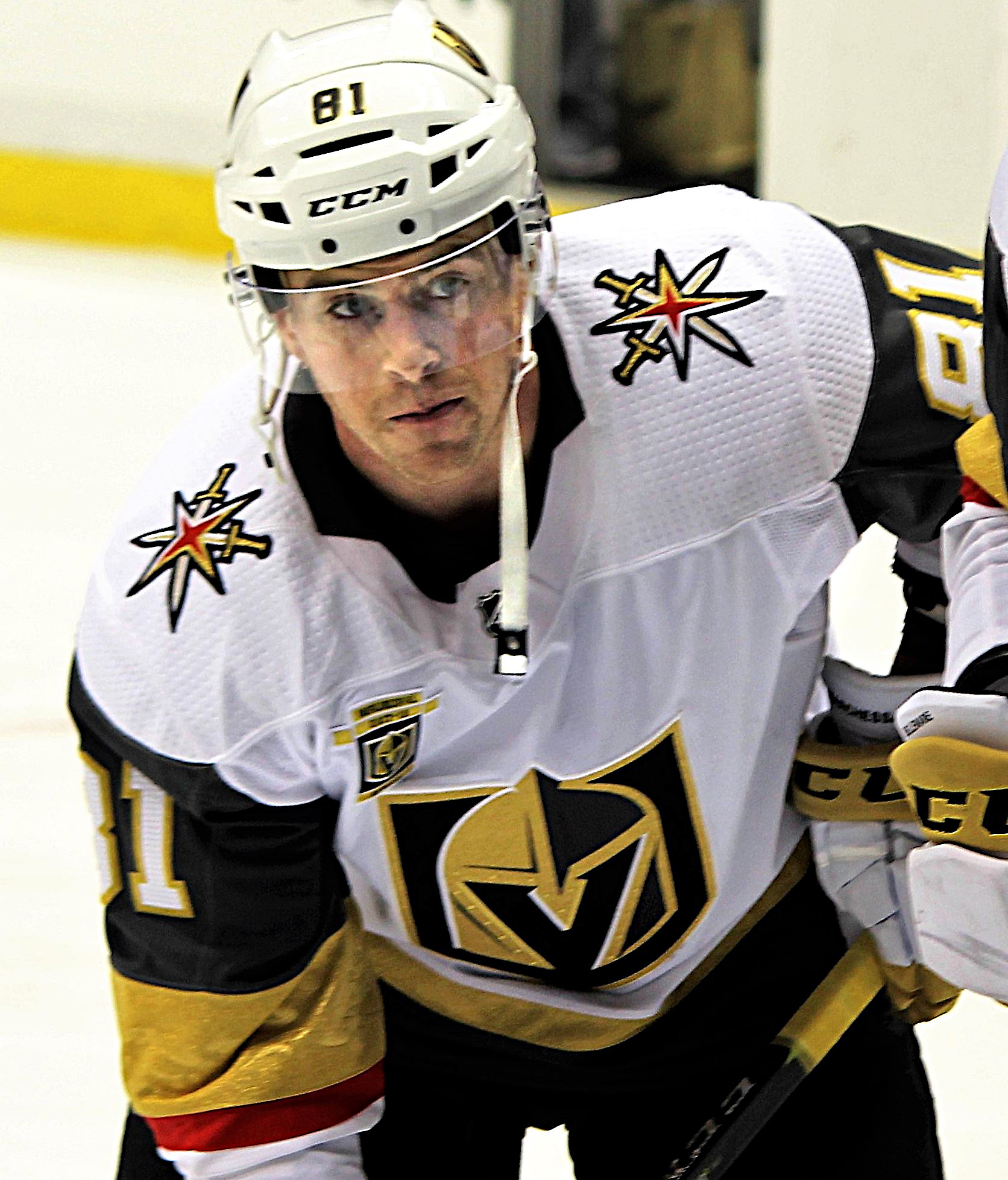
- Marchessault with the Vegas Golden Knights in 2018
- Born: December 27, 1990 (age 35) Cap-Rouge, Quebec, Canada
- Height: 5 ft 9 in (175 cm)
- Weight: 185 lb (84 kg; 13 st 3 lb)
- Position: Forward
- Shoots: Right
- NHL team Former teams: Nashville Predators; Columbus Blue Jackets; Tampa Bay Lightning; Florida Panthers; Vegas Golden Knights
- National team: Canada
- NHL draft: Undrafted
- Playing career: 2011–present

Jonathan Marchessault (English: /ˈmɑːrʃəsoʊ/; né Audy-Marchessault; born December 27, 1990) is a Canadian professional ice hockey player who is a forward for the Nashville Predators of the National Hockey League (NHL). He has previously played for the Columbus Blue Jackets, Tampa Bay Lightning, Florida Panthers, and the Vegas Golden Knights.

Undrafted and regarded as an undersized player, Marchessault began his career as a professional player in the American Hockey League (AHL) in 2011. He signed his first NHL contract with the Blue Jackets the following year, though he remained mostly with their AHL affiliates. He became a more regular fixture with the Lightning in the 2015–16 season, and departed to the in-state rival Panthers that off-season, where he had a 30-goal breakout season.

After being selected by the Golden Knights in the 2017 NHL expansion draft, Marchessault became one of the core pieces of the team's offense, and helped Vegas become the first expansion team to reach the Stanley Cup Final in their inaugural season since the St. Louis Blues in 1968. He was selected as the Golden Knights' All-Star representative in 2022, and led his team to a Stanley Cup victory in 2023. He was elected winner of the Conn Smythe Trophy as the most valuable player of the 2023 playoffs, becoming the first undrafted player to win the award since Wayne Gretzky in 1988.

== Playing career ==
As a youth, Marchessault played in the 2003 and 2004 Quebec International Pee-Wee Hockey Tournaments with a minor ice hockey team from Rive-Nord, Quebec.

=== Junior ===
Marchessault played his entire junior ice hockey career with the Quebec Remparts of the Quebec Major Junior Hockey League (QMJHL). He originally joined the team as a 16-year-old for the 2007–08 season after being drafted by them in the 12th round.

In the 2009–10 season, Marchessault won the Gaétan Duchesne Trophy as the QMJHL's best defensive player. He was also named Player of the Week in both the QMJHL and Canadian Hockey League (CHL) for the week ending December 13, 2010.

As Quebec's alternate captain in his final junior level season, Marchessault finished sixth in the QMJHL in scoring during the 2010–11 regular season. He also led the league in game-winning goals with 11. In the 2011 playoffs, he led the QMJHL in scoring despite Quebec having been eliminated in the semi-finals; he became the first player to lead the QMJHL in playoff scoring despite not playing in the final round.

Marchessault was named the QMJHL Top Star of the Week for the week ending September 19, 2010. He was also named CHL Player of the Week for the week ending April 3, 2011, during the QMJHL playoffs. At the end of the season, Marchessault was awarded the Bud Light Cup as Quebec's player of the year. Moreover, he was named a QMJHL First Team All-Star.

=== Professional ===
==== Connecticut Whale ====
Not having been selected in any NHL entry draft, on June 23, 2011, Marchessault signed his first professional contract with the New York Rangers' American Hockey League (AHL) affiliate, the Connecticut Whale, on a recommendation by Dean Stork, coach of the ECHL's Greenville Road Warriors. Upon signing, Marchessault joined former Remparts teammates Ryan Bourque and Kelsey Tessier within the Rangers organization. Marchessault began his professional career in 2011–12 with the Whale.

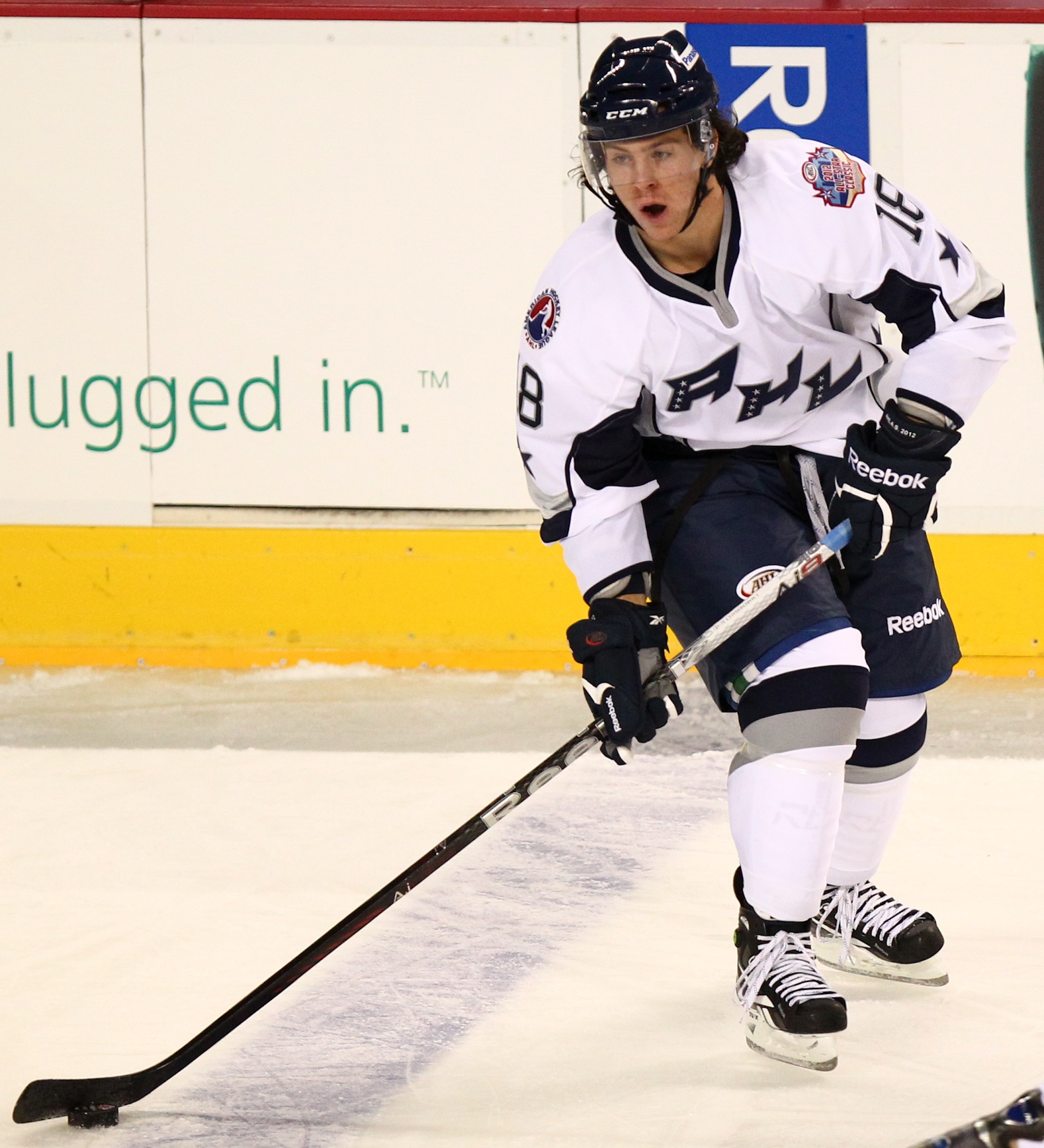
Marchessault in 2013

On October 9, 2011, in his second professional game, Marchessault scored the game-winning shootout goal against the Wilkes-Barre/Scranton Penguins. He scored his first professional non-shootout goal on October 22, in a game against the Springfield Falcons. In his first professional season, Marchessault tied for the Whale team lead with 64 points, leading the team with 40 assists and adding 24 goals.

==== Columbus Blue Jackets (2012–2013) ====
After the 2011–12 season, Marchessault did not re-sign with the Whale, instead signing a three-year, entry-level contract as a free agent with the Columbus Blue Jackets. He played the following season for Columbus' AHL affiliate, the Springfield Falcons, leading the team in scoring and being named a First Team AHL All-Star.

In his second season with Columbus, on March 5, 2014, that season's trade deadline, he was traded with Dalton Smith to the Tampa Bay Lightning in exchange for Dana Tyrell and Matt Taormina.

==== Tampa Bay Lightning (2014–2016) ====
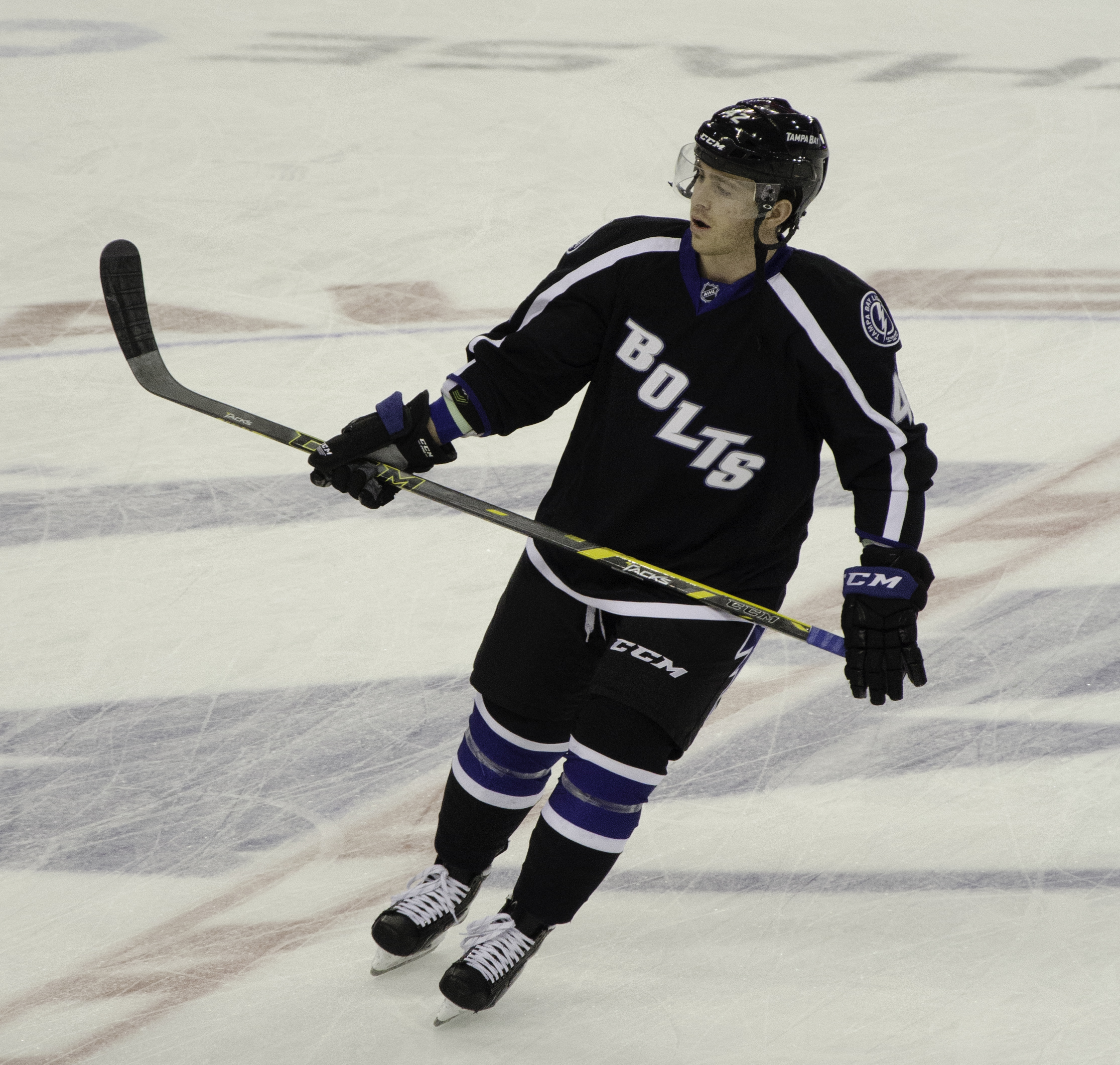
Marchessault during the warmup to the Boston Bruins at Tampa Bay Lightning game on April 11, 2015

On April 11, 2015, the Lightning called Marchessault up from the AHL's Syracuse Crunch to replace an ill Jonathan Drouin in the final game of the regular season. Upon his call-up to the NHL, Marchessault had played in 64 games with Syracuse, leading the team with 41 assists and 64 points. He was also second on the team in goals (23) and tied for second in power play goals (6). On April 11, he scored his first career NHL goal and point in a Tampa Bay's 3–2 shootout victory over the visiting Boston Bruins; he was also named the game's first star by the attending media. The next day, on April 12, the Lightning reassigned Marchessault to Syracuse to join them for the remainder of the regular season and the playoffs. After the Crunch were eliminated from the 2015 AHL playoffs, Marchessault was recalled to practice with the team as one of the "Black Aces," an extra player to fill in for possible injuries on the roster. As a result of Ryan Callahan's emergency appendectomy, Marchessault made his Stanley Cup playoff debut in a 4–1 Lightning's win over the Montreal Canadiens, eliminating the latter from the playoffs.

On June 28, 2015, the Lightning re-signed Marchessault to a one-year, two-way contract. Marchessault appeared in two Stanley Cup playoffs games with the Lightning. He also appeared in two games during the 2014–15 regular season, recording one goal. This was his first career goal, which was scored on April 11, 2015. In addition, Marchessault played in 68 AHL games with the Syracuse Crunch, ranking sixth in the league in assists (43).

==== Florida Panthers (2016–2017) ====
After three seasons within the Lightning organization, Marchessault left as a free agent and signed a two-year, one-way contract with the Florida Panthers on July 1, 2016. In the 2016–17 season, Marchessault got off to a quick start offensively with the Panthers, and enjoyed a break-out season. In becoming one of the best value signings from the previous summer, Marchessault in his first full NHL season led the Panthers with 30 goals in recording 51 points in 75 games. He was the first Panthers player to reach 30 goals since David Booth in 2008–09.

==== Vegas Golden Knights (2017–2024) ====
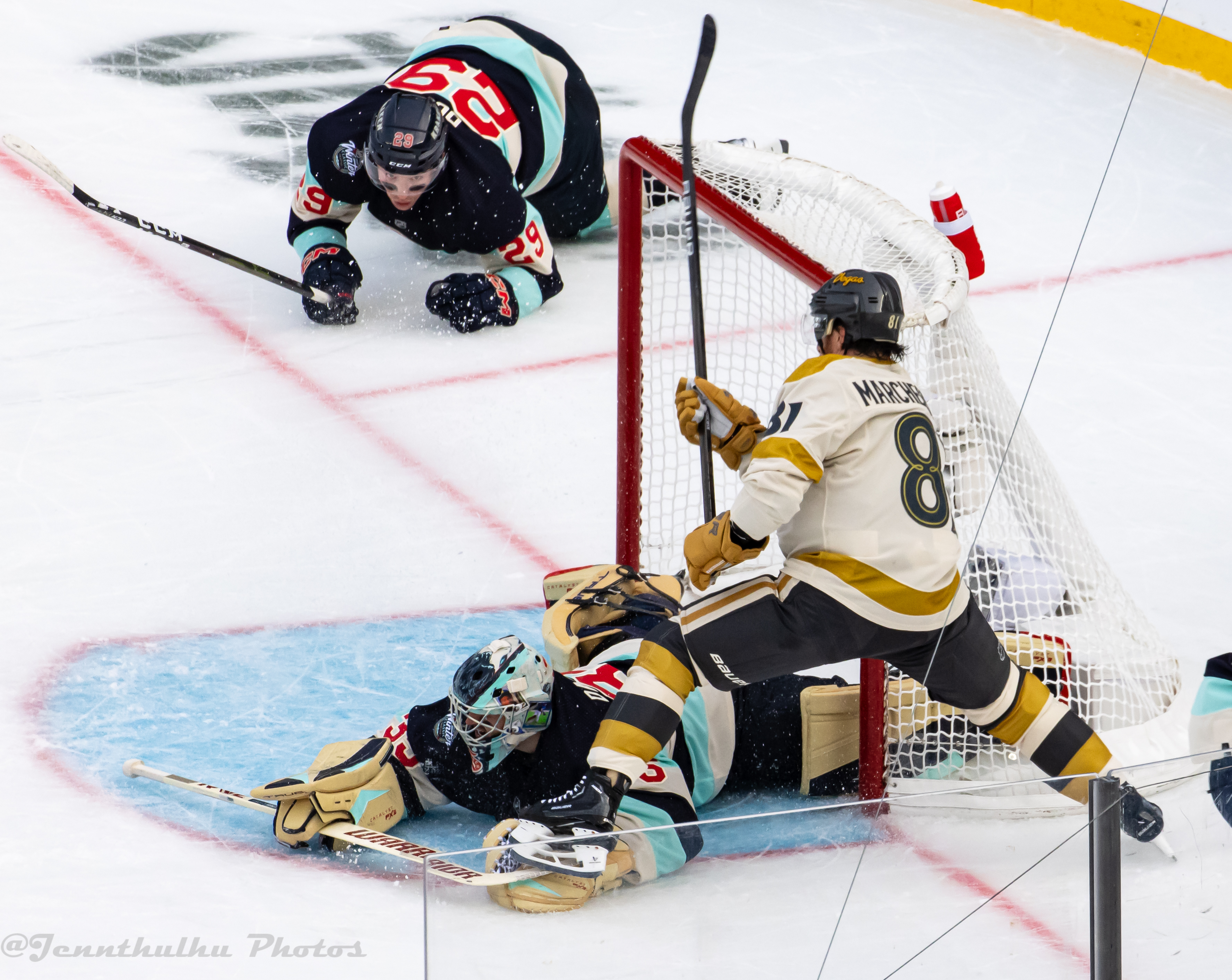
Marchessault making a play in front of Joey Daccord of the Seattle Kraken during the 2024 Winter Classic.

On June 21, 2017, having been exposed by the Panthers, Marchessault was selected by the Vegas Golden Knights in the 2017 NHL expansion draft. On January 3, 2018, Marchessault signed a six-year, $30 million extension with the Golden Knights. With 75 points in the regular season and 21 points in the 2018 Stanley Cup playoffs, Marchessault established himself as one of the league's elite wingers. He led the team in postseason scoring with eight goals as the Golden Knights reached the Stanley Cup Final in their inaugural season.

He scored 25 goals to go with 34 assists during the 2018–19 season, as the Golden Knights once again battled the San Jose Sharks in the 2019 Stanley Cup playoffs. Marchessault scored the game-tying goal in game seven of the first round in the final minute of the game, though the Sharks eventually won in overtime. Afterwards, he was very outspoken about the major penalty call in the third period to teammate Cody Eakin, who cross-checked Sharks forward Joe Pavelski who fell to the ice awkwardly and subsequently began bleeding from his head. The penalty resulted in the Sharks scoring four power-play goals to take a 4–3 lead.

Marchessault scored his first career playoff hat-trick for the Golden Knights against the Colorado Avalanche on June 6, 2021, in game four of their second round Stanley Cup playoffs matchup, helping Vegas to tie the series at 2–2. The Golden Knights reached the Stanley Cup semifinals, but were defeated by the Montreal Canadiens in six games.

The 2021–22 season proved a disappointment for the Golden Knights, plagued by injuries to key players, ultimately missing the playoffs for the first time in franchise history. However, Marchessault enjoyed a strong campaign, equalling his career high in goals and leading the team in points. He was the Golden Knights' representative in the 2022 NHL All-Star Game.

The Golden Knights' results rebounded in the following 2022–23 season, finishing first in the Western Conference to qualify for the 2023 Stanley Cup playoffs. Marchessault managed 28 goals and 57 points in the regular season, but was offensively stymied in the early going in the playoffs, managing only two assists over the course of the team's first seven postseason games. However, his output markedly increased beginning with game three of their second-round series against the Edmonton Oilers. He scored his second career playoff hat-trick, this time a natural one, in game six of the second round to eliminate the Oilers. In the conference final rematch against the Dallas Stars, Marchessault managed a late tying goal in game two, sending it to overtime where the Golden Knights emerged victorious. The Knights reached the Stanley Cup Final for the second time in franchise history, this time facing Marchessault's former team, the Panthers.

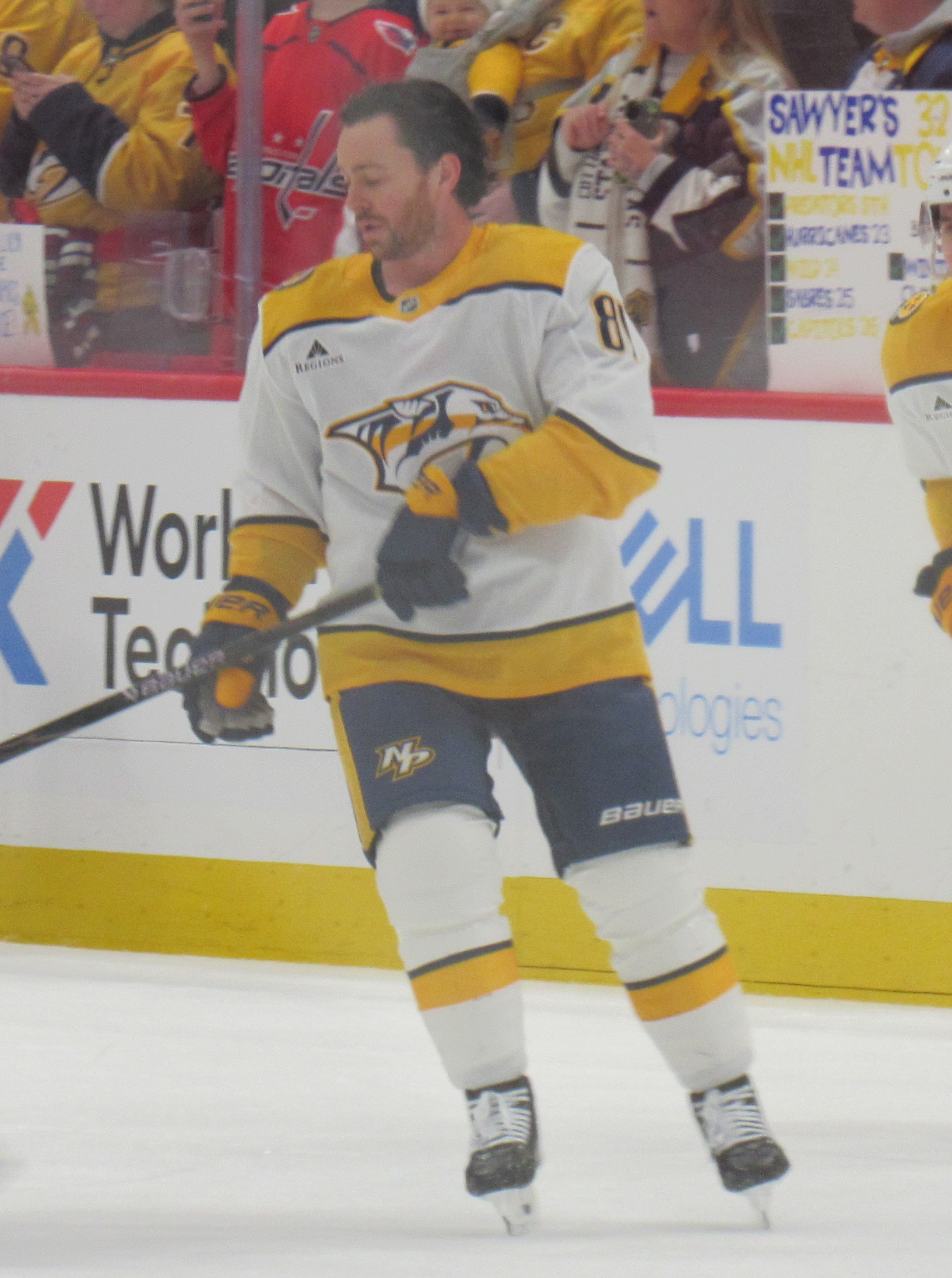
Marchessault with the Predators in 2026

Continuing to score prolifically, many in the media began to suggest that Marchessault would be the favorite for the Conn Smythe Trophy as the most valuable player of the postseason were the Golden Knights to win. Ultimately, the Golden Knights won the Cup in a five-game series. Marchessault tied the Oilers' Leon Draisaitl for first place in goal-scoring in the playoffs (13) and was second in points (25), one behind teammate Jack Eichel, earning as a result the Conn Smythe Trophy.

He was the 10th undrafted player to win the Conn Smythe Trophy, and the first to do so since Wayne Gretzky in 1988, though The Athletic called him "the first true undrafted player ever to win the award" as the previous nine were either players from the World Hockey Association (WHA) merger or from an era when teams could sign young players to protected lists: "Unlike the Bobby Orrs and Jean Béliveaus, Marchessault was simply overlooked." He was one of six original members of the Golden Knights to still be with the team for their first Stanley Cup win six years later, alongside William Karlsson, Reilly Smith, Brayden McNabb, Shea Theodore and William Carrier.

==== Nashville Predators (2024–present) ====
Following the 2023–24 season that saw him record a career-high 42 goals, Marchessault left the Golden Knights as a free agent and signed a five-year, $27.5 million contract with the Nashville Predators on July 1, 2024.

== International play ==
Medal record

Men's ice hockey

Representing Canada

World Championships
Silver medal – second place	2019 Slovakia	

On April 29, 2019, Marchessault was selected to his maiden international tournament after he was named to the Canada national team roster for the 2019 World Championship. Placed on Canada's first line he helped Canada progress through to the playoff rounds before losing the final to Finland national team to finish with the silver medal on May 26, 2019. Marchessault finished the tournament contributing with three goals and seven assists in 10 games.

== Personal life ==
Marchessault was known as Jonathan Audy-Marchessault early in his career. He dropped Audy from his legal surname in 2013, in order to shorten it for his child. Marchessault and his wife have four children. The family resides in Summerlin, Nevada.

== Career statistics ==
=== Regular season and playoffs ===
Bold indicates led league

			Regular season					Playoffs
Season	Team	League	GP	G	A	Pts	PIM	GP	G	A	Pts	PIM
2007–08	Quebec Remparts	QMJHL	56	10	10	20	18	11	1	0	1	6
2008–09	Quebec Remparts	QMJHL	62	18	35	53	75	14	2	4	6	10
2009–10	Quebec Remparts	QMJHL	68	30	41	71	54	9	3	11	14	14
2010–11	Quebec Remparts	QMJHL	68	40	55	95	41	18	11	22	33	12
2011–12	Connecticut Whale	AHL	76	24	40	64	50	9	4	0	4	26
2012–13	Springfield Falcons	AHL	74	21	46	67	65	8	0	3	3	8
2012–13	Columbus Blue Jackets	NHL	2	0	0	0	0	—	—	—	—	—
2013–14	Springfield Falcons	AHL	56	14	27	41	51	—	—	—	—	—
2013–14	Syracuse Crunch	AHL	21	9	6	15	8	—	—	—	—	—
2014–15	Syracuse Crunch	AHL	68	24	43	67	38	3	0	0	0	0
2014–15	Tampa Bay Lightning	NHL	2	1	0	1	0	2	0	0	0	0
2015–16	Syracuse Crunch	AHL	11	6	3	9	6	—	—	—	—	—
2015–16	Tampa Bay Lightning	NHL	45	7	11	18	17	5	0	1	1	6
2016–17	Florida Panthers	NHL	75	30	21	51	38	—	—	—	—	—
2017–18	Vegas Golden Knights	NHL	77	27	48	75	40	20	8	13	21	10
2018–19	Vegas Golden Knights	NHL	82	25	34	59	52	7	4	2	6	6
2019–20	Vegas Golden Knights	NHL	66	22	25	47	28	20	3	7	10	16
2020–21	Vegas Golden Knights	NHL	55	18	26	44	39	19	6	3	9	12
2021–22	Vegas Golden Knights	NHL	76	30	36	66	36	—	—	—	—	—
2022–23	Vegas Golden Knights	NHL	76	28	29	57	21	22	**13**	12	25	14
2023–24	Vegas Golden Knights	NHL	82	42	27	69	40	7	2	2	4	2
2024–25	Nashville Predators	NHL	78	21	35	56	37	—	—	—	—	—
2025–26	Nashville Predators	NHL	62	12	19	31	30	—	—	—	—	—
NHL totals			778	263	311	574	378	102	36	40	76	66

=== International ===
Year	Team	Event	Result	GP	G	A	Pts	PIM
2019	Canada	WC	2nd place, silver medalist(s)	10	3	7	10	8
Senior totals				10	3	7	10	8

== Awards and honours ==
Award	Year	Ref
QMJHL
First All-Star Team	2011	
AHL
AHL All-Star Game	2012, 2013, 2015	
AHL First All-Star Team	2013	
NHL
NHL All-Star Game	2022	
Conn Smythe Trophy	2023	
Stanley Cup champion	2023	

Awards and achievements
Preceded by Cale Makar	Conn Smythe Trophy; 2023	Succeeded by Connor McDavid
