= List of 2023–24 NHL Three Star Awards =

The 2023–24 NHL Three Star Awards are the way the National Hockey League denotes its players of the week and players of the month of the 2023–24 season.

== Weekly ==
Weekly
| Week | First Star | Second Star | Third Star |
|---|---|---|---|
| October 15, 2023 | Auston Matthews (Toronto Maple Leafs) | Elias Pettersson (Vancouver Canucks) | Evgeni Malkin (Pittsburgh Penguins) |
| October 22, 2023 | Alex DeBrincat (Detroit Red Wings) | Alexandar Georgiev (Colorado Avalanche) | Sam Reinhart (Florida Panthers) |
| October 29, 2023 | Tyler Toffoli (New Jersey Devils) | Jonas Johansson (Tampa Bay Lightning) | Ryan Hartman (Minnesota Wild) |
| November 5, 2023 | Quinn Hughes (Vancouver Canucks) | Cam Talbot (Los Angeles Kings) | Mason McTavish (Anaheim Ducks) |
| November 12, 2023 | Sam Reinhart (Florida Panthers) | Kyle Connor (Winnipeg Jets) | William Nylander (Toronto Maple Leafs) |
| November 19, 2023 | Cale Makar (Colorado Avalanche) | William Nylander (Toronto Maple Leafs) | Sidney Crosby (Pittsburgh Penguins) |
| November 26, 2023 | Connor McDavid (Edmonton Oilers) | Nikita Kucherov (Tampa Bay Lightning) | Juuse Saros (Nashville Predators) |
| December 3, 2023 | Connor Ingram (Arizona Coyotes) | Mathew Barzal (New York Islanders) | Jack Hughes (New Jersey Devils) |
| December 10, 2023 | Nikita Kucherov (Tampa Bay Lightning) | Tomas Hertl (San Jose Sharks) | Sam Reinhart (Florida Panthers) |
| December 17, 2023 | Nathan MacKinnon (Colorado Avalanche) | Thatcher Demko (Vancouver Canucks) | Noah Dobson (New York Islanders) |
| December 24, 2023 | Kirill Kaprizov (Minnesota Wild) | Mika Zibanejad (New York Rangers) | Patrick Kane (Detroit Red Wings) |
| December 31, 2023 | Sebastian Aho (Carolina Hurricanes) | Artemi Panarin (New York Rangers) | Luke Hughes (New Jersey Devils) |
| January 7, 2024 | Sam Reinhart (Florida Panthers) | Martin Jones (Toronto Maple Leafs) | Connor Hellebuyck (Winnipeg Jets) |
| January 14, 2024 | Elias Pettersson (Vancouver Canucks) | Blake Coleman (Calgary Flames) | Alexandar Georgiev (Colorado Avalanche) |
| January 21, 2024 | Kirill Kaprizov (Minnesota Wild) | David Pastrnak (Boston Bruins) | Logan Thompson (Vegas Golden Knights) |
| January 28, 2023 | Nikita Kucherov (Tampa Bay Lightning) | Connor McDavid (Edmonton Oilers) | Matthew Tkachuk (Florida Panthers) |
| February 4, 2024 (Note: For performances in the All-Star Game.) | Auston Matthews (Toronto Maple Leafs) | Connor McDavid (Edmonton Oilers) | Alex DeBrincat (Detroit Red Wings) |
| February 11, 2024 | Jacob Markstrom (Calgary Flames) | Sergei Bobrovsky (Florida Panthers) | Nick Suzuki (Montreal Canadiens) |
| February 18, 2024 | Auston Matthews (Toronto Maple Leafs) | Connor McDavid (Edmonton Oilers) | Matthew Tkachuk (Florida Panthers) |
| February 25, 2024 | Kirill Kaprizov (Minnesota Wild) | Mitch Marner (Toronto Maple Leafs) | Igor Shesterkin (New York Rangers) |
| March 3, 2024 | Roman Josi (Nashville Predators) | Brandon Montour (Florida Panthers) | Josh Morrissey (Winnipeg Jets) |
| March 10, 2024 | Nathan MacKinnon (Colorado Avalanche) | Pavel Zacha (Boston Bruins) | Thatcher Demko (Vancouver Canucks) |
| March 17, 2024 | Nikita Kucherov (Tampa Bay Lightning) | Connor Bedard (Chicago Blackhawks) | Marc-Andre Fleury (Minnesota Wild) |
| March 24, 2024 | Alexander Ovechkin (Washington Capitals) | Auston Matthews (Toronto Maple Leafs) | Connor McDavid (Edmonton Oilers) |
| March 31, 2024 | Connor McDavid (Edmonton Oilers) | Logan Thompson (Vegas Golden Knights) | Alexis Lafreniere (New York Rangers) |
| April 7, 2024 | Nikita Kucherov (Tampa Bay Lightning) | Sidney Crosby (Pittsburgh Penguins) | Artemi Panarin (New York Rangers) |
| April 14, 2024 | Auston Matthews (Toronto Maple Leafs) | Roman Josi (Nashville Predators) | Nazem Kadri (Calgary Flames) |

== Monthly ==
Monthly
| Month | First Star | Second Star | Third Star |
|---|---|---|---|
| October | Jack Hughes (New Jersey Devils) | Elias Pettersson (Vancouver Canucks) | David Pastrnak (Boston Bruins) |
| November | Nikita Kucherov (Tampa Bay Lightning) | Cale Makar (Colorado Avalanche) | Quinn Hughes (Vancouver Canucks) |
| December | Nathan MacKinnon (Colorado Avalanche) | Auston Matthews (Toronto Maple Leafs) | Connor Hellebuyck (Winnipeg Jets) |
| January | Nathan MacKinnon (Colorado Avalanche) | Stuart Skinner (Edmonton Oilers) | Elias Pettersson (Vancouver Canucks) |
| February | Auston Matthews (Toronto Maple Leafs) | Connor McDavid (Edmonton Oilers) | Igor Shesterkin (New York Rangers) |
| March | Connor McDavid (Edmonton Oilers) | Nathan MacKinnon (Colorado Avalanche) | Filip Forsberg (Nashville Predators) |

== Rookie of the Month ==
Rookie of the Month
| Month | Player |
|---|---|
| October | Lukas Dostal (Anaheim Ducks) |
| November | Connor Bedard (Chicago Blackhawks) |
| December | Connor Bedard (Chicago Blackhawks) |
| January | Brock Faber (Minnesota Wild) |
| February | Pyotr Kochetkov (Carolina Hurricanes) |
| March | Connor Bedard (Chicago Blackhawks) |
