= 2023–24 Nashville Predators season =

National Hockey League season

2023–24 Nashville Predators
- Division: 4th Central
- Conference: 6th Western
- 2023–24 record: 47–30–5
- Home record: 23–16–2
- Road record: 24–14–3
- Goals for: 269
- Goals against: 248

Team information
- General manager: Barry Trotz
- Coach: Andrew Brunette
- Captain: Roman Josi
- Alternate captains: Ryan McDonagh; Ryan O'Reilly
- Arena: Bridgestone Arena
- Average attendance: 17,306
- Minor league affiliates: Milwaukee Admirals (AHL); Atlanta Gladiators (ECHL)

Team leaders
- Goals: Filip Forsberg (48)
- Assists: Roman Josi (62)
- Points: Filip Forsberg (94)
- Penalty minutes: Michael McCarron (100)
- Plus/minus: Ryan McDonagh (+19)
- Wins: Juuse Saros (35)
- Goals against average: Yaroslav Askarov (1.47)

The 2023–24 Nashville Predators season was the 26th season for the National Hockey League (NHL) franchise that was established on June 25, 1997. The Predators made the playoffs for the ninth time in 10 years after having missed the playoffs last season.

This was the team's first season without David Poile as general manager, following his retirement on June 30, 2023, although he still currently remains with the organization as a creative consultant. Poile was previously the only general manager in team history and retired as both the longest tenured and winningest general manager in team history. On April 9, 2024, the Predators clinched a playoff berth following a 4–3 overtime loss to the Winnipeg Jets. In the Playoffs, the Predators faced the Vancouver Canucks, losing in six games.

== Standings ==
=== Divisional standings ===
Central Division
Pos	Team	GP	W	L	OTL	RW	GF	GA	GD	Pts
1	z – Dallas Stars	82	52	21	9	40	298	234	+64	113
2	x – Winnipeg Jets	82	52	24	6	46	259	199	+60	110
3	x – Colorado Avalanche	82	50	25	7	42	304	254	+50	107
4	x – Nashville Predators	82	47	30	5	38	269	248	+21	99
5	St. Louis Blues	82	43	33	6	31	239	250	−11	92
6	Minnesota Wild	82	39	34	9	32	251	263	−12	87
7	Arizona Coyotes	82	36	41	5	28	256	274	−18	77
8	Chicago Blackhawks	82	23	53	6	17	179	290	−111	52

Source: National Hockey League
Rules for classification: 1) Fewer number of games played (GP, only during regular season); 2) Greater number of regulation wins (RW); 3) Greater number of wins in regulation and overtime, excluding shootout wins (ROW); 4) Greater number of total wins, including shootouts (W); 5) Greater number of points earned in head-to-head play; if teams played an uneven number of head-to-head games, the result of the first game on the home ice of the team with the extra home game is discarded; 6) Greater goal differential (GD); 7) Greater number of goals scored (GF)
x – Clinched playoff spot; z – Clinched conference

=== Conference standings ===
Western Conference Wild Card
Pos	Div	Team	GP	W	L	OTL	RW	GF	GA	GD	Pts
1	CE	x – Nashville Predators	82	47	30	5	38	269	248	+21	99
2	PA	x – Vegas Golden Knights	82	45	29	8	34	267	245	+22	98
3	CE	St. Louis Blues	82	43	33	6	31	239	250	−11	92
4	CE	Minnesota Wild	82	39	34	9	32	251	263	−12	87
5	PA	Calgary Flames	82	38	39	5	32	253	271	−18	81
6	PA	Seattle Kraken	82	34	35	13	28	217	236	−19	81
7	CE	Arizona Coyotes	82	36	41	5	28	256	274	−18	77
8	PA	Anaheim Ducks	82	27	50	5	21	204	295	−91	59
9	CE	Chicago Blackhawks	82	23	53	6	17	179	290	−111	52
10	PA	San Jose Sharks	82	19	54	9	14	181	331	−150	47

Source: National Hockey League
Rules for classification: 1) Fewer number of games played (GP, only during regular season); 2) Greater number of regulation wins (RW); 3) Greater number of wins in regulation and overtime, excluding shootout wins (ROW); 4) Greater number of total wins, including shootouts (W); 5) Greater number of points earned in head-to-head play; if teams played an uneven number of head-to-head games, the result of the first game on the home ice of the team with the extra home game is discarded; 6) Greater goal differential (GD); 7) Greater number of goals scored (GF)
x – Clinched playoff spot

== Schedule and results ==
=== Preseason ===
The preseason schedule was published on June 23, 2023.

2023 preseason game log: 1–4–1 (home: 1–0–1; road: 0–4–0)
#	Date	Visitor	Score	Home	OT	Decision	Location	Attendance	Record	Recap
1	September 25^{[A]}	Nashville	0–5	Florida		Lankinen	Amerant Bank Arena	6,160	0–1–0
2	September 25^{[A]}	Nashville	2–5	Florida		Saros	Amerant Bank Arena	6,365	0–2–0
3	September 27	Tampa Bay	2–1	Nashville	OT	Askarov	Bridgestone Arena	17,159	0–2–1
4	September 30	Nashville	4–5	Tampa Bay		Askarov	Amalie Arena	14,197	0–3–1
5	October 5	Carolina	1–5	Nashville		Saros	Bridgestone Arena	17,159	1–3–1
6	October 6	Nashville	1–4	Carolina		Lankinen	PNC Arena	14,886	1–4–1
Notes:^{A} Indicates split-squad.

=== Regular season ===
The regular season schedule was released on June 27, 2023.

2023–24 game log

October: 4–5–0 (home: 3–2–0; road: 1–3–0)
#	Date	Visitor	Score	Home	OT	Decision	Location	Attendance	Record	Pts	Recap
1	October 10	Nashville	3–5	Tampa Bay		Saros	Amalie Arena	19,092	0–1–0	0
2	October 12	Seattle	0–3	Nashville		Saros	Bridgestone Arena	17,629	1–1–0	2
3	October 14	Nashville	2–3	Boston		Saros	TD Garden	17,850	1–2–0	2
4	October 17	Edmonton	6–1	Nashville		Lankinen	Bridgestone Arena	17,216	1–3–0	2
5	October 19	Nashville	4–1	NY Rangers		Saros	Madison Square Garden	18,006	2–3–0	4
6	October 21	San Jose	1–5	Nashville		Saros	Bridgestone Arena	17,222	3–3–0	6
7	October 24	Vancouver	3–2	Nashville		Saros	Bridgestone Arena	17,159	3–4–0	6
8	October 28	Toronto	2–3	Nashville	OT	Saros	Bridgestone Arena	17,537	4–4–0	8
9	October 31	Nashville	2–5	Vancouver		Lankinen	Rogers Arena	18,413	4–5–0	8

November: 7–6–0 (home: 5–3–0; road: 2–3–0)
#	Date	Visitor	Score	Home	OT	Decision	Location	Attendance	Record	Pts	Recap
10	November 2	Nashville	2–4	Seattle		Saros	Climate Pledge Arena	17,151	4–6–0	8
11	November 4	Nashville	5–2	Edmonton		Lankinen	Rogers Place	18,354	5–6–0	10
12	November 7	Nashville	2–4	Calgary		Saros	Scotiabank Saddledome	16,975	5–7–0	10
13	November 9	Nashville	3–6	Winnipeg		Saros	Canada Life Centre	12,199	5–8–0	10
14	November 11	Arizona	7–5	Nashville		Saros	Bridgestone Arena	17,303	5–9–0	10
15	November 14	Anaheim	3–2	Nashville		Saros	Bridgestone Arena	17,159	5–10–0	10
16	November 18	Chicago	2–4	Nashville		Lankinen	Bridgestone Arena	17,397	6–10–0	12
17	November 20	Colorado	3–4	Nashville		Saros	Bridgestone Arena	17,159	7–10–0	14
18	November 22	Calgary	2–4	Nashville		Saros	Bridgestone Arena	17,252	8–10–0	16
19	November 24	Nashville	8–3	St. Louis		Lankinen	Enterprise Center	18,096	9–10–0	18
20	November 26	Winnipeg	2–3	Nashville		Saros	Bridgestone Arena	17,159	10–10–0	20
21	November 28	Pittsburgh	2–3	Nashville	OT	Saros	Bridgestone Arena	17,159	11–10–0	22
22	November 30	Minnesota	6–1	Nashville		Saros	Bridgestone Arena	17,159	11–11–0	22

December: 9–5–1 (home: 3–4–0; road: 6–1–1)
#	Date	Visitor	Score	Home	OT	Decision	Location	Attendance	Record	Pts	Recap
23	December 2	NY Rangers	4–3	Nashville		Lankinen	Bridgestone Arena	17,341	11–12–0	22
24	December 3	Nashville	2–1	Buffalo		Saros	KeyBank Center	14,644	12–12–0	24
25	December 5	Nashville	4–3	Chicago	SO	Saros	United Center	16,521	13–12–0	26
26	December 7	Tampa Bay	1–5	Nashville		Saros	Bridgestone Arena	17,159	14–12–0	28
27	December 9	Nashville	0–4	Toronto		Lankinen	Scotiabank Arena	18,611	14–13–0	28
28	December 10	Nashville	2–1	Montreal		Saros	Bell Centre	20,864	15–13–0	30
29	December 12	Philadelphia	2–3	Nashville	OT	Saros	Bridgestone Arena	17,159	16–13–0	32
30	December 15	Nashville	6–5	Carolina	OT	Lankinen	PNC Arena	18,770	17–13–0	34
31	December 16	Washington	1–3	Nashville		Saros	Bridgestone Arena	17,267	18–13–0	36
32	December 19	Vancouver	5–2	Nashville		Saros	Bridgestone Arena	17,159	18–14–0	36
33	December 21	Nashville	4–2	Philadelphia		Saros	Wells Fargo Center	19,313	19–14–0	38
34	December 23	Dallas	3–2	Nashville		Saros	Bridgestone Arena	17,159	19–15–0	38
35	December 27	Carolina	5–2	Nashville		Saros	Bridgestone Arena	17,846	19–16–0	38
36	December 29	Nashville	4–5	Detroit	OT	Saros	Little Caesars Arena	19,515	19–16–1	39
37	December 30	Nashville	3–2	Washington	OT	Askarov	Capital One Arena	18,573	20–16–1	41

January: 6–7–1 (home: 2–4–0; road: 4–3–1)
#	Date	Visitor	Score	Home	OT	Decision	Location	Attendance	Record	Pts	Recap
38	January 2	Chicago	0–3	Nashville		Saros	Bridgestone Arena	17,363	21–16–1	43
39	January 4	Calgary	6–3	Nashville		Saros	Bridgestone Arena	17,203	21–17–1	43
40	January 6	Nashville	4–3	Dallas		Lankinen	American Airlines Center	18,532	22–17–1	45
41	January 9	Anaheim	5–3	Nashville		Saros	Bridgestone Arena	17,159	22–18–1	45
42	January 12	Nashville	6–3	Dallas		Lankinen	American Airlines Center	18,532	23–18–1	47
43	January 13	NY Islanders	1–3	Nashville		Saros	Bridgestone Arena	17,474	24–18–1	49
44	January 15	Nashville	1–4	Vegas		Saros	T-Mobile Arena	17,719	24–19–1	49
45	January 18	Nashville	2–1	Los Angeles		Saros	Crypto.com Arena	18,145	25–19–1	51
46	January 20	Nashville	2–3	Arizona		Saros	Mullett Arena	4,600	25–20–1	51
47	January 22	Florida	4–1	Nashville		Saros	Bridgestone Arena	17,159	25–21–1	51
48	January 25	Nashville	3–2	Minnesota		Saros	Xcel Energy Center	18,254	26–21–1	53
49	January 27	Nashville	1–4	Edmonton		Lankinen	Rogers Place	18,347	26–22–1	53
50	January 29	Nashville	3–4	Ottawa	OT	Saros	Canadian Tire Centre	16,284	26–22–2	54
51	January 31	Los Angeles	4–2	Nashville		Saros	Bridgestone Arena	17,453	26–23–2	54

February: 8–2–0 (home: 3–2–0; road: 5–0–0)
#	Date	Visitor	Score	Home	OT	Decision	Location	Attendance	Record	Pts	Recap
52	February 10	Arizona	4–5	Nashville	OT	Saros	Bridgestone Arena	17,507	27–23–2	56
53	February 13	New Jersey	4–2	Nashville		Saros	Bridgestone Arena	17,159	27–24–2	56
54	February 15	Dallas	9–2	Nashville		Saros	Bridgestone Arena	17,159	27–25–2	56
55	February 17	Nashville	5–2	St. Louis		Saros	Enterprise Center	18,096	28–25–2	58
56	February 20	Nashville	5–3	Vegas		Lankinen	T-Mobile Arena	17,727	29–25–2	60
57	February 22	Nashville	4–1	Los Angeles		Saros	Crypto.com Arena	17,415	30–25–2	62
58	February 24	Nashville	4–2	San Jose		Saros	SAP Center	15,919	31–25–2	64
59	February 25	Nashville	4–2	Anaheim		Lankinen	Honda Center	16,370	32–25–2	66
60	February 27	Ottawa	1–4	Nashville		Saros	Bridgestone Arena	17,159	33–25–2	68
61	February 29	Minnesota	1–6	Nashville		Saros	Bridgestone Arena	17,159	34–25–2	70

March: 9–2–2 (home: 5–0–1; road: 4–2–1)
#	Date	Visitor	Score	Home	OT	Decision	Location	Attendance	Record	Pts	Recap
62	March 2	Colorado	1–5	Nashville		Saros	Bridgestone Arena	17,474	35–25–2	72
63	March 5	Montreal	4–3	Nashville	OT	Saros	Bridgestone Arena	17,159	35–25–3	73
64	March 7	Buffalo	2–4	Nashville		Saros	Bridgestone Arena	17,159	36–25–3	75
65	March 9	Nashville	2–1	Columbus		Lankinen	Nationwide Arena	17,602	37–25–3	77
66	March 10	Nashville	3–4	Minnesota	OT	Saros	Xcel Energy Center	18,800	37–25–4	78
67	March 13	Nashville	4–2	Winnipeg		Saros	Canada Life Centre	13,331	38–25–4	80
68	March 16	Nashville	4–1	Seattle		Saros	Climate Pledge Arena	17,151	39–25–4	82
69	March 19	San Jose	2–8	Nashville		Saros	Bridgestone Arena	17,159	40–25–4	84
70	March 21	Nashville	3–0	Florida		Lankinen	Amerant Bank Arena	19,780	41–25–4	86
71	March 23	Detroit	0–1	Nashville		Saros	Bridgestone Arena	17,836	42–25–4	88
72	March 26	Vegas	4–5	Nashville	OT	Saros	Bridgestone Arena	17,778	43–25–4	90
73	March 28	Nashville	4–8	Arizona		Saros	Mullett Arena	4,600	43–26–4	90
74	March 30	Nashville	4–7	Colorado		Lankinen	Ball Arena	18,121	43–27–4	90

April: 4–3–1 (home: 2–1–1; road: 2–2–0)
#	Date	Visitor	Score	Home	OT	Decision	Location	Attendance	Record	Pts	Recap
75	April 2	Boston	3–0	Nashville		Saros	Bridgestone Arena	17,476	43–28–4	90
76	April 4	St. Louis	3–6	Nashville		Saros	Bridgestone Arena	17,420	44–28–4	92
77	April 6	Nashville	0–2	NY Islanders		Lankinen	UBS Arena	17,255	44–29–4	92
78	April 7	Nashville	3–2	New Jersey	SO	Saros	Prudential Center	15,409	45–29–4	94
79	April 9	Winnipeg	4–3	Nashville	OT	Saros	Bridgestone Arena	17,262	45–29–5	95
80	April 12	Nashville	5–1	Chicago		Lankinen	United Center	19,449	46–29–5	97
81	April 13	Columbus	4–6	Nashville		Saros	Bridgestone Arena	17,282	47–29–5	99
82	April 15	Nashville	2–4	Pittsburgh		Saros	PPG Paints Arena	18,198	47–30–5	99

Legend: Win (2 points) Loss (0 points) Overtime/shootout loss (1 point)

=== Playoffs ===
2024 Stanley Cup playoffs

Western Conference first round vs. (P1) Vancouver Canucks: Vancouver won 4–2
#	Date	Visitor	Score	Home	OT	Decision	Attendance	Series	Recap
1	April 21	Nashville	2–4	Vancouver		Saros	18,967	0–1
2	April 23	Nashville	4–1	Vancouver		Saros	18,960	1–1
3	April 26	Vancouver	2–1	Nashville		Saros	17,474	1–2
4	April 28	Vancouver	4–3	Nashville	OT	Saros	17,590	1–3
5	April 30	Nashville	2–1	Vancouver		Saros	19,036	2–3
6	May 3	Vancouver	1–0	Nashville		Saros	17,682	2–4

Legend: Win Loss

== Player statistics ==
=== Skaters ===
Regular season
Player	GP	G	A	Pts	+/−	PIM
Filip Forsberg	82	48	46	94	+16	43
Roman Josi	82	23	62	85	+12	45
Gustav Nyquist	81	23	52	75	+7	8
Ryan O'Reilly	82	26	43	69	+6	18
Tommy Novak	71	18	27	45	−3	8
Luke Evangelista	80	16	23	39	0	18
Colton Sissons	81	15	20	35	−6	38
Ryan McDonagh	74	3	29	32	+19	31
Kiefer Sherwood	68	10	17	27	+17	41
Cole Smith	80	9	14	23	+5	63
Michael McCarron	70	12	10	22	+4	100
Philip Tomasino	41	7	13	20	−6	25
Alexandre Carrier	73	4	16	20	+7	44
Mark Jankowski	32	7	8	15	+11	8
Tyson Barrie	41	1	14	15	−10	16
Yakov Trenin^{‡}	60	10	4	14	+12	38
Jeremy Lauzon	79	6	8	14	−3	98
Cody Glass	41	6	7	13	−9	20
Dante Fabbro	56	3	10	13	+9	24
Juuso Parssinen	44	8	4	12	−6	12
Jason Zucker^{†}	18	5	2	7	−4	23
Luke Schenn	63	1	6	7	+1	43
Spencer Stastney	20	2	2	4	+9	4
Anthony Beauvillier^{†}	15	1	2	3	−6	2
Marc Del Gaizo	9	0	3	3	+2	2
Liam Foudy^{†}	12	0	3	3	−2	2
Denis Gurianov^{‡}	14	1	1	2	+4	0
Samuel Fagemo^{‡}	4	1	0	1	0	0
Egor Afanasyev	2	0	0	0	−1	0

Playoffs
Player	GP	G	A	Pts	+/−	PIM
Filip Forsberg	6	2	4	6	0	2
Gustav Nyquist	6	1	3	4	−3	2
Alexandre Carrier	6	1	2	3	−1	0
Roman Josi	6	1	2	3	+1	2
Jason Zucker	6	1	2	3	+4	2
Anthony Beauvillier	6	1	1	2	0	2
Mark Jankowski	6	1	1	2	−1	2
Ryan O'Reilly	6	1	1	2	−1	0
Luke Evangelista	6	1	0	1	0	2
Kiefer Sherwood	6	1	0	1	−2	0
Colton Sissons	6	1	0	1	+2	6
Tyson Barrie	1	0	1	1	−1	0
Jeremy Lauzon	6	0	1	1	−2	4
Ryan McDonagh	6	0	1	1	−1	6
Juuso Parssinen	1	0	0	0	0	0
Dante Fabbro	3	0	0	0	0	0
Spencer Stastney	3	0	0	0	+1	0
Luke Schenn	5	0	0	0	+1	0
Cole Smith	5	0	0	0	−1	0
Michael McCarron	6	0	0	0	−3	2
Tommy Novak	6	0	0	0	−1	0

=== Goaltenders ===
Regular season
Player	GP	GS	TOI	W	L	OT	GA	GAA	SA	SV%	SO	G	A	PIM
Juuse Saros	64	64	3,266:28	35	24	5	173	2.86	1,845	.906	3	0	2	2
Kevin Lankinen	24	17	1,191:25	11	6	0	56	2.82	610	.908	1	0	0	0
Yaroslav Askarov	2	1	81:40	1	0	0	2	1.47	35	.943	0	0	0	0

Playoffs
Player	GP	GS	TOI	W	L	GA	GAA	SA	SV%	SO	G	A	PIM
Juuse Saros	6	6	357:18	2	4	12	2.02	120	.900	0	0	0	0

^{†}Denotes player spent time with another team before joining the Predators. Stats reflect time with the Predators only.
^{‡}Denotes player was traded mid-season. Stats reflect time with the Predators only.
Bold/italics denotes franchise record.

== Transactions ==
The Predators have been involved in the following transactions during the 2023–24 season.

=== Key ===
† Contract is entry-level.
‡ Contract initially takes effect in the 2024–25 season.

=== Trades ===
Date	Details		Ref
June 29, 2023	To Detroit Red Wings 2nd-round pick in 2023; TBL 5th-round pick in 2023	To Nashville Predators VAN 2nd-round pick in 2023	
June 29, 2023	To Dallas Stars 3rd-round pick in 2023	To Nashville Predators 3rd-round pick in 2024; 6th-round pick in 2024	
June 29, 2023	To Tampa Bay Lightning TBL 4th-round pick in 2023	To Nashville Predators CHI 4th-round pick in 2024	
June 29, 2023	To New Jersey Devils 7th-round pick in 2024	To Nashville Predators 7th-round pick in 2023	
March 7, 2024	To Chicago Blackhawks 5th-round pick in 2024	To Nashville Predators Anthony Beauvillier	
March 7, 2024	To Colorado Avalanche Graham Sward; Yakov Trenin	To Nashville Predators Jeremy Hanzel; 3rd-round pick in 2025	
March 8, 2024	To Arizona Coyotes DAL 6th-round pick in 2024	To Nashville Predators Jason Zucker	
March 8, 2024	To Philadelphia Flyers Denis Gurianov	To Nashville Predators Wade Allison	
May 21, 2024	To Tampa Bay Lightning Ryan McDonagh; EDM 4th-round pick in 2024	To Nashville Predators 7th-round pick in 2024; 2nd-round pick in 2025	
June 23, 2024	To San Jose Sharks Egor Afanasyev	To Nashville Predators Ozzy Wiesblatt	
June 25, 2024	To Detroit Red Wings Jesse Kiiskinen; TBL 2nd-round pick in 2024	To Nashville Predators Andrew Gibson	

=== Players acquired ===
Date	Player	Former team	Term	Via	Ref
July 1, 2023	Troy Grosenick	Philadelphia Flyers	1-year	Free agency	
July 1, 2023	Gustav Nyquist	Minnesota Wild	2-year	Free agency	
July 1, 2023	Ryan O'Reilly	Toronto Maple Leafs	4-year	Free agency	
July 1, 2023	Luke Schenn	Toronto Maple Leafs	3-year	Free agency	
July 3, 2023	Jasper Weatherby	Detroit Red Wings	1-year	Free agency	
July 11, 2023	Denis Gurianov	Montreal Canadiens	1-year	Free agency	
October 2, 2023	Samuel Fagemo	Los Angeles Kings		Waivers	
October 21, 2023	Liam Foudy	Columbus Blue Jackets		Waivers	
March 7, 2024	Jaret Anderson-Dolan	Los Angeles Kings		Los Angeles Kings	

=== Players lost ===
Date	Player	New team	Term	Via	Ref
July 1, 2023	Devin Cooley	Buffalo Sabres	1-year	Free agency	
July 1, 2023	Matt Duchene	Dallas Stars	1-year	Free agency	
July 3, 2023	John Leonard	Arizona Coyotes	1-year	Free agency	
July 5, 2023	Rasmus Asplund	Florida Panthers	1-year	Free agency	
July 11, 2023	Aidan Rueschhoff	Wilkes-Barre/Scranton Penguins (AHL)	1-year	Free agency	
July 14, 2023	Zach Sanford	Arizona Coyotes	1-year	Free agency	
July 18, 2023	Jimmy Huntington	Hershey Bears (AHL)	1-year	Free agency	
July 18, 2023	Isaac Ratcliffe	Chicago Wolves (AHL)	1-year	Free agency	
August 9, 2023	Cal Foote	New Jersey Devils	1-year	Free agency	
November 11, 2023	Samuel Fagemo	Los Angeles Kings		Waivers	

=== Signings ===
Date	Player	Term	Ref
July 1, 2023	Anthony Angello	2-year	
July 1, 2023	Alexandre Carrier	1-year	
July 1, 2023	Cody Glass	2-year	
July 6, 2023	Kalan Lind	3-year†	
July 6, 2023	Tanner Molendyk	3-year†	
January 24, 2024	Cole Smith	2-year‡	
March 8, 2024	Dante Fabbro	1-year‡	
March 8, 2024	Gustavs Grigals	1-year	
March 8, 2024	Mark Jankowski	2-year‡	

== Draft picks ==
Below are the Nashville Predators' selections at the 2023 NHL entry draft, which was held on June 28 to 29, 2023, at Bridgestone Arena in Nashville.

Round	#	Player	Pos.	Nationality	Team (League)
1	15	Matthew Wood	RW	Canada	Connecticut Huskies (HE)
1	24	Tanner Molendyk	D	Canada	Saskatoon Blades (WHL)
2	43	Felix Nilsson	C	Sweden	Rögle BK (J20 Nationell)
2	46	Kalan Lind	LW	Canada	Red Deer Rebels (WHL)
3	68	Jesse Kiiskinen	RW	Finland	Lahti Pelicans (U20 SM-sarja)
3	83	Dylan MacKinnon	D	Canada	Halifax Mooseheads (QMJHL)
4	111	Joey Willis	C	United States	Saginaw Spirit (OHL)
4	121	Juha Jatkola	G	Finland	KalPa (Liiga)
5	143	Sutter Muzzatti	C	United States	RPI Engineers (ECAC)
6	175	Austin Roest	C	Canada	Everett Silvertips (WHL)
7	218	Aiden Fink	RW	Canada	Brooks Bandits (AJHL)
