= 2023–24 Colorado Avalanche season =

National Hockey League season

2023–24 Colorado Avalanche
- Division: 3rd Central
- Conference: 4th Western
- 2023–24 record: 50–25–7
- Home record: 31–9–1
- Road record: 19–16–6
- Goals for: 304
- Goals against: 254

Team information
- General manager: Chris MacFarland
- Coach: Jared Bednar
- Captain: Gabriel Landeskog
- Alternate captains: Nathan MacKinnon; Cale Makar; Mikko Rantanen
- Arena: Ball Arena
- Average attendance: 18,102
- Minor league affiliates: Colorado Eagles (AHL); Utah Grizzlies (ECHL)

Team leaders
- Goals: Nathan MacKinnon (51)
- Assists: Nathan MacKinnon (89)
- Points: Nathan MacKinnon (140)
- Penalty minutes: Josh Manson (87)
- Plus/minus: Nathan MacKinnon (+35)
- Wins: Alexandar Georgiev (38)
- Goals against average: Justus Annunen (2.25)

The 2023–24 Colorado Avalanche season was the 45th season for the Avalanche as the National Hockey League (NHL) franchise that joined the league in 1979, and their 28th playing season since the franchise relocated from Quebec City prior to the start of the 1995–96 NHL season.

On March 30, 2024, the Avalanche clinched a playoff berth for the seventh consecutive season after a 7–4 win against the Nashville Predators. On April 18, Nathan MacKinnon broke the single season point record, across both the Nordiques and Avalanche, with 140 points. In the playoffs, the Avalanche defeated the Winnipeg Jets in five games in the first round, before losing to the Dallas Stars in the second round in six games.

On June 27, MacKinnon became the first Avalanche player to win the Hart Memorial Trophy since Peter Forsberg in the 2002–03 season.

== Standings ==
=== Divisional standings ===
Central Division
Pos	Team	GP	W	L	OTL	RW	GF	GA	GD	Pts
1	z – Dallas Stars	82	52	21	9	40	298	234	+64	113
2	x – Winnipeg Jets	82	52	24	6	46	259	199	+60	110
3	x – Colorado Avalanche	82	50	25	7	42	304	254	+50	107
4	x – Nashville Predators	82	47	30	5	38	269	248	+21	99
5	St. Louis Blues	82	43	33	6	31	239	250	−11	92
6	Minnesota Wild	82	39	34	9	32	251	263	−12	87
7	Arizona Coyotes	82	36	41	5	28	256	274	−18	77
8	Chicago Blackhawks	82	23	53	6	17	179	290	−111	52

Source: National Hockey League
Rules for classification: 1) Fewer number of games played (GP, only during regular season); 2) Greater number of regulation wins (RW); 3) Greater number of wins in regulation and overtime, excluding shootout wins (ROW); 4) Greater number of total wins, including shootouts (W); 5) Greater number of points earned in head-to-head play; if teams played an uneven number of head-to-head games, the result of the first game on the home ice of the team with the extra home game is discarded; 6) Greater goal differential (GD); 7) Greater number of goals scored (GF)
x – Clinched playoff spot; z – Clinched conference

=== Conference standings ===
Western Conference Wild Card
Pos	Div	Team	GP	W	L	OTL	RW	GF	GA	GD	Pts
1	CE	x – Nashville Predators	82	47	30	5	38	269	248	+21	99
2	PA	x – Vegas Golden Knights	82	45	29	8	34	267	245	+22	98
3	CE	St. Louis Blues	82	43	33	6	31	239	250	−11	92
4	CE	Minnesota Wild	82	39	34	9	32	251	263	−12	87
5	PA	Calgary Flames	82	38	39	5	32	253	271	−18	81
6	PA	Seattle Kraken	82	34	35	13	28	217	236	−19	81
7	CE	Arizona Coyotes	82	36	41	5	28	256	274	−18	77
8	PA	Anaheim Ducks	82	27	50	5	21	204	295	−91	59
9	CE	Chicago Blackhawks	82	23	53	6	17	179	290	−111	52
10	PA	San Jose Sharks	82	19	54	9	14	181	331	−150	47

Source: National Hockey League
Rules for classification: 1) Fewer number of games played (GP, only during regular season); 2) Greater number of regulation wins (RW); 3) Greater number of wins in regulation and overtime, excluding shootout wins (ROW); 4) Greater number of total wins, including shootouts (W); 5) Greater number of points earned in head-to-head play; if teams played an uneven number of head-to-head games, the result of the first game on the home ice of the team with the extra home game is discarded; 6) Greater goal differential (GD); 7) Greater number of goals scored (GF)
x – Clinched playoff spot

== Schedule and results ==
=== Preseason ===
The Avalanche pre-season schedule was released on June 23, 2023.

2023 preseason game log: 2–4–0 (home: 2–1–0; road: 0–3–0)
#	Date	Away	Score	Home	OT	Decision	Attendance	Record	Recap
1	September 24	Minnesota	4–3	Colorado		Holm	14,501	0–1–0
2	September 25	Vegas	2–3	Colorado		Annunen	13,294	1–1–0
3	September 28	Colorado	2–4	Minnesota		Annunen	16,215	1–2–0
4	October 1	Dallas	3–4	Colorado	OT	Georgiev	15,207	2–2–0
5	October 3	Colorado	1–3	Dallas		Annunen	14,523	2–3–0
6	October 5	Colorado	3–4	Vegas		Georgiev	17,539	2–4–0
Legend: Win Loss OT/SO loss

=== Regular season ===
The Avalanche regular season schedule was released on June 27, 2023.

2023–24 game log

October: 6–2–0 (home: 2–0–0; road: 4–2–0)
#	Date	Opponent	Score	OT	Decision	Attendance	Record	Pts	Recap
1	October 11	@ Los Angeles	5–2		Georgiev	18,145	1–0–0	2
2	October 14	@ San Jose	2–1	SO	Georgiev	17,435	2–0–0	4
3	October 17	@ Seattle	4–1		Georgiev	17,151	3–0–0	6
4	October 19	Chicago	4–0		Georgiev	18,140	4–0–0	8
5	October 21	Carolina	6–4		Georgiev	18,131	5–0–0	10
6	October 24	@ NY Islanders	7–4		Georgiev	14,856	6–0–0	12
7	October 26	@ Pittsburgh	0–4		Georgiev	17,154	6–1–0	12
8	October 29	@ Buffalo	0–4		Georgiev	15,717	6–2–0	12

November: 9–4–1 (home: 6–2–0; road: 3–2–1)
#	Date	Opponent	Score	OT	Decision	Attendance	Record	Pts	Recap
9	November 1	St. Louis	4–1		Prosvetov	18,091	7–2–0	14
10	November 4	@ Vegas	0–7		Georgiev	18,512	7–3–0	14
11	November 7	New Jersey	6–3		Georgiev	18,087	8–3–0	16
12	November 9	Seattle	3–4		Prosvetov	18,124	8–4–0	16
13	November 11	St. Louis	2–8		Georgiev	18,132	8–5–0	16
14	November 13	@ Seattle	5–1		Georgiev	17,151	9–5–0	18
15	November 15	Anaheim	8-2		Georgiev	18,029	10–5–0	20
16	November 18	@ Dallas	6–3		Georgiev	18,532	11–5–0	22
17	November 20	@ Nashville	3–4		Georgiev	17,159	11–6–0	22
18	November 22	Vancouver	5–2		Georgiev	18,133	12–6–0	24
19	November 24	@ Minnesota	3–2		Georgiev	19,057	13–6–0	26
20	November 25	Calgary	3–1		Prosvetov	18,139	14–6–0	28
21	November 27	Tampa Bay	4–1		Georgiev	18,009	15–6–0	30
22	November 30	@ Arizona	3–4	OT	Georgiev	4,600	15–6–1	31

December: 8–5–2 (home: 7–2–0; road: 1–3–2)
#	Date	Opponent	Score	OT	Decision	Attendance	Record	Pts	Recap
23	December 2	@ Anaheim	3–4	SO	Prosvetov	14,000	15–6–2	32
24	December 3	@ Los Angeles	1–4		Georgiev	18,145	15–7–2	32
25	December 5	Anaheim	3–2		Georgiev	18,021	16–7–2	34
26	December 7	Winnipeg	2–4		Georgiev	18,008	16–8–2	34
27	December 9	Philadelphia	2–5		Prosvetov	18,119	16–9–2	34
28	December 11	Calgary	6–5		Prosvetov	17,967	17–9–2	36
29	December 13	Buffalo	5–1		Prosvetov	18,034	18–9–2	38
30	December 16	@ Winnipeg	2–6		Prosvetov	13,515	18–10–2	38
31	December 17	San Jose	6–2		Georgiev	18,093	19–10–2	40
32	December 19	@ Chicago	2–3		Georgiev	19,719	19–11–2	40
33	December 21	Ottawa	6–4		Georgiev	18,107	20–11–2	42
34	December 23	Arizona	4–1		Georgiev	18,117	21–11–2	44
35	December 27	@ Arizona	4–5	OT	Georgiev	4,600	21–11–3	45
36	December 29	@ St. Louis	2–1		Georgiev	18,096	22–11–3	47
37	December 31	San Jose	3–1		Georgiev	18,140	23–11–3	49

January: 9–3–0 (home: 5–1–0; road: 4–2–0)
#	Date	Opponent	Score	OT	Decision	Attendance	Record	Pts	Recap
38	January 2	NY Islanders	5–4	OT	Georgiev	18,121	24–11–3	51
39	January 4	@ Dallas	5–4	OT	Georgiev	18,532	25–11–3	53
40	January 6	Florida	4–8		Georgiev	18,132	25–12–3	53
41	January 8	Boston	4–3	SO	Georgiev	18,050	26–12–3	55
42	January 10	Vegas	3–0		Georgiev	18,039	27–12–3	57
43	January 13	@ Toronto	5–3		Georgiev	19,298	28–12–3	59
44	January 15	@ Montreal	3–4		Georgiev	21,105	28–13–3	59
45	January 16	@ Ottawa	7–4		Annunen	16,242	29–13–3	61
46	January 18	@ Boston	2–5		Georgiev	17,850	29–14–3	61
47	January 20	@ Philadelphia	7–4		Georgiev	19,078	30–14–3	63
48	January 24	Washington	6–2		Georgiev	18,136	31–14–3	65
49	January 26	Los Angeles	5–1		Georgiev	18,131	32–14–3	67

February: 5–5–2 (home: 3–1–0; road: 2–4–2)
#	Date	Opponent	Score	OT	Decision	Attendance	Record	Pts	Recap
50	February 5	@ NY Rangers	1–2	OT	Georgiev	18,006	32–14–4	68
51	February 6	@ New Jersey	3–5		Annunen	16,326	32–15–4	68
52	February 8	@ Carolina	2–5		Georgiev	18,720	32–16–4	68
53	February 10	@ Florida	0–4		Georgiev	19,304	32–17–4	68
54	February 13	@ Washington	6–3		Georgiev	17,878	33–17–4	70
55	February 15	@ Tampa Bay	3–6		Annunen	19,092	33–18–4	70
56	February 18	Arizona	4–3		Georgiev	18,133	34–18–4	72
57	February 20	Vancouver	3–1		Georgiev	18,121	35–18–4	74
58	February 22	@ Detroit	1–2	OT	Annunen	19,515	35–18–5	75
59	February 24	Toronto	3–4		Georgiev	18,135	35–19–5	75
60	February 27	Dallas	5–1		Georgiev	18,117	36–19–5	77
61	February 29	@ Chicago	5–0		Annunen	18,096	37–19–5	79

March: 10–2–1 (home: 6–1–1; road: 4–1–0)
#	Date	Opponent	Score	OT	Decision	Attendance	Record	Pts	Recap
62	March 2	@ Nashville	1–5		Georgiev	17,474	37–20–5	79
63	March 4	Chicago	5–0		Annunen	18,125	38–20–5	81
64	March 6	Detroit	7–2		Georgiev	18,132	39–20–5	83
65	March 8	Minnesota	2–1	OT	Georgiev	18,134	40–20–5	85
66	March 12	@ Calgary	6–2		Annunen	17,185	41–20–5	87
67	March 13	@ Vancouver	4–3	OT	Georgiev	18,880	42–20–5	89
68	March 16	@ Edmonton	3–2	OT	Georgiev	18,347	43–20–5	91
69	March 19	@ St. Louis	4–3		Annunen	18,096	44–20–5	93
70	March 22	Columbus	6–1		Georgiev	18,117	45–20–5	95
71	March 24	Pittsburgh	5–4	OT	Georgiev	18,129	46–20–5	97
72	March 26	Montreal	1–2		Annunen	18,119	46–21–5	97
73	March 28	NY Rangers	2–3	SO	Georgiev	18,130	46–21–6	98
74	March 30	Nashville	7–4		Annunen	18,121	47–21–6	100

April: 3–4–1 (home: 2–2–0; road: 1–2–1)
#	Date	Opponent	Score	OT	Decision	Attendance	Record	Pts	Recap
75	April 1	@ Columbus	1–4		Annunen	16,731	47–22–6	100
76	April 4	@ Minnesota	5–2		Annunen	18,803	48–22–6	102
77	April 5	@ Edmonton	2–6		Georgiev	18,347	48–23–6	102
78	April 7	Dallas	4–7		Georgiev	18,116	48–24–6	102
79	April 9	Minnesota	5–2		Georgiev	18,097	49–24–6	104
80	April 13	Winnipeg	0–7		Georgiev	18,121	49–25–6	104
81	April 14	@ Vegas	3–4	OT	Georgiev	18,239	49–25–7	105
82	April 18	Edmonton	5–1		Annunen	18,129	50–25–7	107

Legend: Win (2 points) Loss (0 points) OT/SO loss (1 point)

=== Playoffs ===
2024 Stanley Cup playoffs

Western Conference first round vs. (C2) Winnipeg Jets: Colorado won 4–1
#	Date	Opponent	Score	OT	Decision	Attendance	Series	Recap
1	April 21	@ Winnipeg	6–7		Georgiev	15,225	0–1
2	April 23	@ Winnipeg	5–2		Georgiev	15,225	1–1
3	April 26	Winnipeg	6–2		Georgiev	18,124	2–1
4	April 28	Winnipeg	5–1		Georgiev	18,129	3–1
5	April 30	@ Winnipeg	6–3		Georgiev	15,225	4–1

Western Conference second round vs. (C1) Dallas Stars: Dallas won 4–2
#	Date	Opponent	Score	OT	Decision	Attendance	Series	Recap
1	May 7	@ Dallas	4–3	OT	Georgiev	18,532	1–0
2	May 9	@ Dallas	3–5		Georgiev	18,532	1–1
3	May 11	Dallas	1–4		Georgiev	18,131	1–2
4	May 13	Dallas	1–5		Georgiev	18,123	1–3
5	May 15	@ Dallas	5–3		Georgiev	18,532	2–3
6	May 17	Dallas	1–2	2OT	Georgiev	18,126	2–4

Legend: Win Loss

== Player statistics ==
=== Skaters ===
Regular season
Player	GP	G	A	Pts	+/–	PIM
Nathan MacKinnon	82	51	89	140	+35	42
Mikko Rantanen	80	42	62	104	+19	50
Cale Makar	77	21	69	90	+15	16
Jonathan Drouin	79	19	37	56	+12	28
Valeri Nichushkin	54	28	25	53	+5	22
Devon Toews	82	12	38	50	+28	18
Ross Colton	80	17	23	40	−8	61
Artturi Lehkonen	45	16	18	34	+11	14
Miles Wood	74	9	17	26	−5	75
Logan O'Connor	57	13	12	25	+13	34
Josh Manson	76	8	17	25	+13	87
Ryan Johansen^{‡}	63	13	10	23	−6	34
Bowen Byram^{‡}	55	8	12	20	+1	40
Andrew Cogliano	75	6	13	19	+11	16
Sam Girard	59	3	15	18	0	10
Jack Johnson	80	3	13	16	+15	38
Zach Parise	30	5	5	10	–7	8
Casey Mittelstadt^{†}	18	4	6	10	–2	4
Sam Malinski	23	3	7	10	+3	6
Joel Kiviranta	56	3	6	9	–1	12
Fredrik Olofsson	57	3	6	9	–5	8
Tomas Tatar^{‡}	27	1	8	9	0	10
Sean Walker^{†}	18	4	3	7	+2	16
Brandon Duhaime^{†}	18	1	5	5	+2	4
Caleb Jones	25	0	5	5	+4	8
Yakov Trenin^{†}	16	2	1	3	+3	2
Kurtis MacDermid^{‡}	29	2	0	2	+3	23
Riley Tufte	5	1	1	2	−2	2
Chris Wagner	13	1	1	2	+3	9
Jean-Luc Foudy	4	1	0	1	+1	0
Jason Polin	7	1	0	1	+1	2
Ben Meyers^{‡}	9	1	0	1	−2	0
Oskar Olausson	1	0	0	0	0	0
Ondrej Pavel	2	0	0	0	−1	2

Playoffs
Player	GP	G	A	Pts	+/–	PIM
Cale Makar	11	5	10	15	−3	0
Nathan MacKinnon	11	4	10	14	−1	4
Mikko Rantanen	11	4	10	14	−1	8
Artturi Lehkonen	11	6	5	11	−2	4
Valeri Nichushkin	8	9	1	10	+1	2
Casey Mittelstadt	11	3	6	9	0	2
Josh Manson	11	2	5	7	+7	12
Devon Toews	10	1	5	6	+4	2
Andrew Cogliano	11	0	5	5	+2	2
Ross Colton	11	1	3	4	+2	2
Miles Wood	11	3	0	3	+1	13
Zach Parise	11	2	1	3	−1	0
Jonathan Drouin	3	0	3	3	−1	2
Sam Girard	9	0	3	3	+3	0
Joel Kiviranta	8	1	1	2	+3	4
Yakov Trenin	10	1	0	1	+1	4
Brandon Duhaime	11	1	0	1	−2	8
Nikolai Kovalenko	2	0	0	0	–1	0
Chris Wagner	2	0	0	0	0	0
Caleb Jones	3	0	0	0	+1	6
Jack Johnson	11	0	0	0	+4	2
Sean Walker	11	0	0	0	−5	6

=== Goaltenders ===
Regular season
Player	GP	GS	TOI	W	L	OT	GA	GAA	SA	SV%	SO	G	A	PIM
Alexandar Georgiev	63	62	3,637:57	38	18	5	183	3.02	1,770	.897	2	0	2	4
Justus Annunen	14	12	801:05	8	4	1	30	2.25	414	.928	2	0	0	0
Ivan Prosvetov	11	8	494:11	4	3	1	26	3.16	248	.895	0	0	0	0

Playoffs
Player	GP	GS	TOI	W	L	GA	GAA	SA	SV%	SO	G	A	PIM
Alexandar Georgiev	11	11	425:23	6	5	33	2.85	311	.897	0	0	0	0

^{†}Denotes player spent time with another team before joining the Avalanche. Stats reflect time with the Avalanche only.
^{‡}Denotes player was traded mid-season. Stats reflect time with the Avalanche only.
Bold/italics denotes franchise record.

== Transactions ==
The Avalanche have been involved in the following transactions during the 2023–24 season.

Key:

† Contract is entry-level.
‡ Contract initially takes effect in the 2024–25 season.

=== Trades ===
Date	Details		Ref
June 28, 2023	To Tampa Bay Lightning MTL 2nd-round pick in 2023	To Colorado Avalanche Ross Colton	
October 10, 2023	To Carolina Hurricanes Callahan Burke	To Colorado Avalanche Caleb Jones	
December 16, 2023	To Seattle Kraken Tomas Tatar	To Colorado Avalanche 5th-round pick in 2024	
March 1, 2024	To New Jersey Devils Kurtis MacDermid	To Colorado Avalanche Zakhar Bardakov; 7th-round pick in 2024	
March 6, 2024	To Buffalo Sabres Bowen Byram	To Colorado Avalanche Casey Mittelstadt	
March 6, 2024	To Philadelphia Flyers Ryan Johansen; Conditional 1st-round pick in 2025	To Colorado Avalanche Sean Walker; 5th-round pick in 2026	

=== Players acquired ===
Date	Player	Former team	Term	Via	Ref
July 1, 2023	Jack Ahcan	Boston Bruins	2-year	Free agency	
July 1, 2023	Jonathan Drouin	Montreal Canadiens	1-year	Free agency	
July 1, 2023	Arvid Holm	Winnipeg Jets	1-year	Free agency	
July 1, 2023	Corey Schueneman	Montreal Canadiens	1-year	Free agency	
July 1, 2023	Riley Tufte	Dallas Stars	1-year	Free agency	
July 1, 2023	Chris Wagner	Boston Bruins	1-year	Free agency	
July 1, 2023	Miles Wood	New Jersey Devils	6-year	Free agency	
September 12, 2023	Tomas Tatar	New Jersey Devils	1-year	Free agency	
October 9, 2023	Ivan Prosvetov	Arizona Coyotes		Waivers	

=== Players lost ===
Date	Player	New team	Term	Via	Ref
July 1, 2023	J. T. Compher	Detroit Red Wings	5-year	Free agency	
July 1, 2023	Lars Eller	Pittsburgh Penguins	2-year	Free agency	
July 1, 2023	Josh Jacobs	St. Louis Blues	1-year	Free agency	
July 1, 2023	Jonas Johansson	Tampa Bay Lightning	2-year	Free agency	
July 1, 2023	Erik Johnson	Buffalo Sabres	1-year	Free agency	
July 1, 2023	Mikhail Maltsev	Los Angeles Kings	1-year	Free agency	
July 1, 2023	Matt Nieto	Pittsburgh Penguins	2-year	Free agency	
July 2, 2023	Evan Rodrigues	Florida Panthers	4-year	Free agency	
July 3, 2023	Charles Hudon	Ontario Reign (AHL)	2-year	Free agency	
July 18, 2023	Denis Malgin	ZSC Lions (NL)	5-year	Free agency	
August 18, 2023	Ryan Merkley	Kunlun Red Star (KHL)	1-year	Free agency	
September 13, 2023	Keith Kinkaid	New Jersey Devils	1-year	Free agency	
June 21, 2024	Andrew Cogliano			Retirement	

=== Signings ===
Date	Player	Term	Ref
July 1, 2023	Bowen Byram	2-year	
July 1, 2023	Andrew Cogliano	1-year	
July 2, 2023	Justus Annunen	1-year	
July 2, 2023	Jack Johnson	1-year	
July 17, 2023	Ross Colton	4-year	
July 25, 2023	Nikolai Kovalenko	2-year†	
July 26, 2023	Ben Meyers	1-year	
August 18, 2023	Matt Stienburg	2-year†	
October 6, 2023	Saige Weinstein	3-year†	
October 13, 2023	Devon Toews	7-year‡	
November 12, 2023	Joel Kiviranta	1-year	
March 5, 2024	Ivan Ivan	2-year‡	
March 7, 2024	Jeremy Hanzel	3-year†	
March 26, 2024	Justus Annunen	2-year	
June 13, 2024	Jere Innala	1-year†	
June 25, 2024	Casey Mittelstadt	3-year	

== Draft picks ==
Below are the Avalanche's selections at the 2023 NHL entry draft, which was held on June 28 to 29, 2023, at Bridgestone Arena in Nashville.

Round	#	Player	Pos.	Nationality	Team (League)
1	27	Calum Ritchie	C	Canada	Oshawa Generals (OHL)
1	31	Mikhail Gulyayev	D	Russia	Avangard Omsk (KHL)
5	155	Nikita Ishimnikov	D	Russia	JHC Avto (MHL)
6	187	Jeremy Hanzel	D	Canada	Seattle Thunderbirds (WHL)
7	219	Maros Jedlicka	C	Slovakia	HKM Zvolen (Slovak Extraliga)
