= 2023–24 Edmonton Oilers season =

National Hockey League season

2023–24 Edmonton Oilers
- Western Conference champions
- Division: 2nd Pacific
- Conference: 5th Western
- 2023–24 record: 49–27–6
- Home record: 28–9–4
- Road record: 21–18–2
- Goals for: 294
- Goals against: 237

Team information
- General manager: Ken Holland
- Coach: Jay Woodcroft (Oct. 11 – Nov. 12); Kris Knoblauch (Nov. 12 – Jun. 24)
- Captain: Connor McDavid
- Alternate captains: Leon Draisaitl; Ryan Nugent-Hopkins; Darnell Nurse
- Arena: Rogers Place
- Average attendance: 18,267
- Minor league affiliates: Bakersfield Condors (AHL); Fort Wayne Komets (ECHL)

Team leaders
- Goals: Zach Hyman (54)
- Assists: Connor McDavid (100)
- Points: Connor McDavid (132)
- Penalty minutes: Evander Kane (85)
- Plus/minus: Mattias Ekholm (+44)
- Wins: Stuart Skinner (36)
- Goals against average: Calvin Pickard (2.45)

The 2023–24 Edmonton Oilers season was the 45th season for the National Hockey League (NHL) franchise that was established on June 22, 1979, and 52nd season for the organization overall, including their play in the World Hockey Association (WHA).

During the off-season, the Oilers acquired forward Connor Brown and defenceman Ben Gleason via free agency. They also re-signed forward Mattias Janmark. The team started the season poorly, going 3–9–1 the worst start since 1993–94 season before firing head coach Jay Woodcroft and replacing him with Kris Knoblauch. The team's fortunes soon experienced an eventual rejuvenation in their performance, leading to a significant rebound and ultimately achieving a record of 46 wins, 18 losses, and 5 overtime losses under the leadership of Knoblauch. Edmonton then signed free agent Corey Perry during the season, after Perry's existing contract with the Chicago Blackhawks was terminated for misconduct. Nearing the trade deadline, the team acquired centres Sam Carrick and Adam Henrique via a three-way trade; they also acquired defenceman Troy Stecher.

Throughout the duration of the regular season, the Oilers only managed to tally an abysmal 3–9–1 record in their opening games, resulting in them being in joint last place in the league standings alongside the San Jose Sharks. Consequently, the decision was made to terminate the contract of head coach Jay Woodcroft. A high point during this time was hosting and winning the 2023 Heritage Classic, the first outdoor NHL game in Edmonton since they hosted the 2003 Heritage Classic. Nevertheless, their lackluster beginning was soon eclipsed by the Oilers' remarkable achievement of a 16-game winning streak, setting a new Canadian and franchise record, which started on December 21, 2023, and ended on February 6, 2024. The Oilers eventually finished the regular season with 104 points via a 49–27–6 record, which gave them second place in the Pacific Division. Moreover, team captain Connor McDavid led the team in scoring with 132 points. 100 of those points were assists, making him the first NHL player in over three decades and the fourth player (alongside Wayne Gretzky, Mario Lemieux and Bobby Orr) in NHL history to record at least 100 assists in a single NHL season, with the most recent being Wayne Gretzky dating back to the 1990–91 NHL season. Fellow Oilers teammate Zach Hyman would net a personal-best of 54 goals and 77 points for the first time in his career.

On April 5, the Oilers clinched their fifth consecutive playoff spot after a 6–2 win over the Colorado Avalanche. In the first round, they eliminated the Los Angeles Kings for the third consecutive season, this time in five games. In the second round, they dispatched the Vancouver Canucks in seven games. In the Western Conference finals, they ousted the Dallas Stars in six games, advancing to the Stanley Cup Final for the first time since 2006, where they faced the Florida Panthers. During the 2024 Stanley Cup Final, the Oilers found themselves trailing 3-0 in the series before staging an unforeseen comeback by winning the following three games to push the series to force a seventh game. This dramatic turn of events could have potentially marked the first reverse sweep in recent memory, a feat not witnessed in the NHL since 2014 and the Stanley Cup Final since 1942. However, despite the team's valiant efforts, the Oilers were unable to sustain their momentum and ultimately succumbed to the Panthers in the crucial final game seven of the series.

Although the Oilers fell short in the Stanley Cup Final, they did not come away empty-handed; for his outstanding performance throughout the entire playoff and Final run, team captain Connor McDavid was awarded the Conn Smythe Trophy as the most valuable player (MVP) of the playoffs. McDavid became the first player since Jean-Sebastien Giguere in 2003 and the sixth overall in NHL history to be bestowed with the Conn Smythe as a member of the losing team.

== Standings ==
=== Divisional standings ===
Pacific Division
Pos	Team	GP	W	L	OTL	RW	GF	GA	GD	Pts
1	y – Vancouver Canucks	82	50	23	9	44	279	223	+56	109
2	x – Edmonton Oilers	82	49	27	6	39	294	237	+57	104
3	x – Los Angeles Kings	82	44	27	11	37	256	215	+41	99
4	x – Vegas Golden Knights	82	45	29	8	34	267	245	+22	98
5	Calgary Flames	82	38	39	5	32	253	271	−18	81
6	Seattle Kraken	82	34	35	13	28	217	236	−19	81
7	Anaheim Ducks	82	27	50	5	21	204	295	−91	59
8	San Jose Sharks	82	19	54	9	14	181	331	−150	47

Source: National Hockey League
Rules for classification: 1) Fewer number of games played (GP, only during regular season); 2) Greater number of regulation wins (RW); 3) Greater number of wins in regulation and overtime, excluding shootout wins (ROW); 4) Greater number of total wins, including shootouts (W); 5) Greater number of points earned in head-to-head play; if teams played an uneven number of head-to-head games, the result of the first game on the home ice of the team with the extra home game is discarded; 6) Greater goal differential (GD); 7) Greater number of goals scored (GF)
x – Clinched playoff spot; y – Clinched division

=== Conference standings ===
Western Conference Wild Card
Pos	Div	Team	GP	W	L	OTL	RW	GF	GA	GD	Pts
1	CE	x – Nashville Predators	82	47	30	5	38	269	248	+21	99
2	PA	x – Vegas Golden Knights	82	45	29	8	34	267	245	+22	98
3	CE	St. Louis Blues	82	43	33	6	31	239	250	−11	92
4	CE	Minnesota Wild	82	39	34	9	32	251	263	−12	87
5	PA	Calgary Flames	82	38	39	5	32	253	271	−18	81
6	PA	Seattle Kraken	82	34	35	13	28	217	236	−19	81
7	CE	Arizona Coyotes	82	36	41	5	28	256	274	−18	77
8	PA	Anaheim Ducks	82	27	50	5	21	204	295	−91	59
9	CE	Chicago Blackhawks	82	23	53	6	17	179	290	−111	52
10	PA	San Jose Sharks	82	19	54	9	14	181	331	−150	47

Source: National Hockey League
Rules for classification: 1) Fewer number of games played (GP, only during regular season); 2) Greater number of regulation wins (RW); 3) Greater number of wins in regulation and overtime, excluding shootout wins (ROW); 4) Greater number of total wins, including shootouts (W); 5) Greater number of points earned in head-to-head play; if teams played an uneven number of head-to-head games, the result of the first game on the home ice of the team with the extra home game is discarded; 6) Greater goal differential (GD); 7) Greater number of goals scored (GF)
x – Clinched playoff spot

== Schedule and results ==
=== Preseason ===
The preseason schedule was published on June 23, 2023.

2023 preseason game log: 5–2–1 (Home: 3–0–1; Road: 2–2–0)
#	Date	Visitor	Score	Home	OT	Decision	Attendance	Record	Recap
1	September 24	Winnipeg	2–1	Edmonton	SO	Rodrigue	17,419	0–0–1
2	September 25	Edmonton	0–5	Winnipeg		Pickard	11,629	0–1–1
3	September 27	Vancouver	1–2	Edmonton	OT	Skinner	16,700	1–1–1
4	September 29	Edmonton	2–1	Calgary	OT	Campbell	17,965	2–1–1
5	September 30	Edmonton	2–5	Vancouver		Skinner	18,488	2–2–1
6	October 2	Edmonton	4–1	Seattle		Campbell	17,151	3–2–1
7	October 4	Calgary	2–7	Edmonton		Skinner	18,197	4–2–1
8	October 6	Seattle	1–3	Edmonton		Campbell	18,141	5–2–1

=== Regular season ===
The Edmonton Oilers regular season schedule was released on June 27, 2023.

2023–24 game log

October: 2–5–1 (Home: 1–2–1; Road: 1–3–0)
#	Date	Visitor	Score	Home	OT	Decision	Attendance	Record	Points	Recap
1	October 11	Edmonton	1–8	Vancouver		Campbell	18,706	0–1–0	0
2	October 14	Vancouver	4–3	Edmonton		Skinner	18,347	0–2–0	0
3	October 17	Edmonton	6–1	Nashville		Campbell	17,216	1–2–0	2
4	October 19	Edmonton	1–4	Philadelphia		Campbell	17,590	1–3–0	2
5	October 21	Winnipeg	3–2	Edmonton	OT	Skinner	18,347	1–3–1	3
6	October 24	Edmonton	4–7	Minnesota		Campbell	17,064	1–4–1	3
7	October 26	NY Rangers	3–0	Edmonton		Skinner	17,939	1–5–1	3
8	October 29	Calgary	2–5	Edmonton		Skinner	55,411 (outdoors)	2–5–1	5

November: 7–7–0 (Home: 4–2–0; Road: 3–5–0)
#	Date	Visitor	Score	Home	OT	Decision	Attendance	Record	Points	Recap
9	November 2	Dallas	4–3	Edmonton		Skinner	17,290	2–6–1	5
10	November 4	Nashville	5–2	Edmonton		Campbell	18,354	2–7–1	5
11	November 6	Edmonton	2–6	Vancouver		Skinner	18,857	2–8–1	5
12	November 9	Edmonton	2–3	San Jose		Skinner	12,206	2–9–1	5
13	November 11	Edmonton	4–1	Seattle		Skinner	17,151	3–9–1	7
14	November 13	NY Islanders	1–4	Edmonton		Skinner	17,881	4–9–1	9
15	November 15	Seattle	3–4	Edmonton	OT	Skinner	18,347	5–9–1	11
16	November 18	Edmonton	4–6	Tampa Bay		Skinner	19,092	5–10–1	11
17	November 20	Edmonton	3–5	Florida		Pickard	19,628	5–11–1	11
18	November 22	Edmonton	3–6	Carolina		Skinner	18,805	5–12–1	11
19	November 24	Edmonton	5–0	Washington		Skinner	18,573	6–12–1	13
20	November 26	Anaheim	2–8	Edmonton		Skinner	17,781	7–12–1	15
21	November 28	Vegas	4–5	Edmonton	SO	Skinner	18,098	8–12–1	17
22	November 30	Edmonton	3–1	Winnipeg		Skinner	13,611	9–12–1	19

December: 9–3–0 (Home: 4–2–0; Road: 5–1–0)
#	Date	Visitor	Score	Home	OT	Decision	Attendance	Record	Points	Recap
23	December 6	Carolina	1–6	Edmonton		Skinner	18,347	10–12–1	21
24	December 8	Minnesota	3–4	Edmonton		Skinner	18,173	11–12–1	23
25	December 10	New Jersey	1–4	Edmonton		Pickard	18,347	12–12–1	25
26	December 12	Chicago	1–4	Edmonton		Skinner	18,347	13–12–1	27
27	December 14	Tampa Bay	7–4	Edmonton		Skinner	18,060	13–13–1	27
28	December 16	Florida	5–1	Edmonton		Pickard	18,347	13–14–1	27
29	December 19	Edmonton	1–3	NY Islanders		Skinner	16,523	13–15–1	27
30	December 21	Edmonton	6–3	New Jersey		Pickard	16,514	14–15–1	29
31	December 22	Edmonton	4–3	NY Rangers		Skinner	18,006	15–15–1	31
32	December 28	Edmonton	5–0	San Jose		Skinner	17,435	16–15–1	33
33	December 30	Edmonton	3–2	Los Angeles	SO	Skinner	18,145	17–15–1	35
34	December 31	Edmonton	7–2	Anaheim		Pickard	16,041	18–15–1	37

January: 11–0–0 (Home: 7–0–0; Road: 4–0–0)
#	Date	Visitor	Score	Home	OT	Decision	Attendance	Record	Points	Recap
35	January 2	Philadelphia	2–5	Edmonton		Skinner	18,347	19–15–1	39
36	January 6	Ottawa	1–3	Edmonton		Skinner	18,347	20–15–1	41
37	January 9	Edmonton	2–1	Chicago		Skinner	19,756	21–15–1	43
38	January 11	Edmonton	3–2	Detroit	OT	Pickard	19,515	22–15–1	45
39	January 13	Edmonton	2–1	Montreal	OT	Skinner	21,105	23–15–1	47
40	January 16	Toronto	2–4	Edmonton		Skinner	18,347	24–15–1	49
41	January 18	Seattle	2–4	Edmonton		Skinner	18,347	25–15–1	51
42	January 20	Edmonton	3–1	Calgary		Skinner	19,289	26–15–1	53
43	January 23	Columbus	1–4	Edmonton		Skinner	18,347	27–15–1	55
44	January 25	Chicago	0–3	Edmonton		Pickard	18,347	28–15–1	57
45	January 27	Nashville	1–4	Edmonton		Skinner	18,347	29–15–1	59

February: 6–5–1 (Home: 3–2–1; Road: 3–3–0)
#	Date	Visitor	Score	Home	OT	Decision	Attendance	Record	Points	Recap
46	February 6	Edmonton	1–3	Vegas		Skinner	18,433	29–16–1	59
47	February 9	Edmonton	5–3	Anaheim		Pickard	17,489	30–16–1	61
48	February 10	Edmonton	0–4	Los Angeles		Skinner	18,145	30–17–1	61
49	February 13	Detroit	4–8	Edmonton		Skinner	18,347	31–17–1	63
50	February 15	Edmonton	3–6	St. Louis		Skinner	18,096	31–18–1	63
51	February 17	Edmonton	4–3	Dallas	OT	Pickard	18,532	32–18–1	65
52	February 19	Edmonton	6–3	Arizona		Skinner	4,600	33–18–1	67
53	February 21	Boston	6–5	Edmonton	OT	Skinner	18,347	33–18–2	68
54	February 23	Minnesota	4–2	Edmonton		Pickard	18,347	33–19–2	68
55	February 24	Calgary	6–3	Edmonton		Skinner	18,347	33–20–2	68
56	February 26	Los Angeles	2–4	Edmonton		Skinner	18,347	34–20–2	70
57	February 28	St. Louis	2–3	Edmonton	OT	Skinner	18,347	35–20–2	72

March: 10–3–2 (Home: 6–0–1; Road: 4–3–1)
#	Date	Visitor	Score	Home	OT	Decision	Attendance	Record	Points	Recap
58	March 2	Edmonton	2–1	Seattle		Skinner	17,151	36–20–2	74
59	March 3	Pittsburgh	1–6	Edmonton		Pickard	18,347	37–20–2	76
60	March 5	Edmonton	2–1	Boston	OT	Skinner	17,850	38–20–2	78
61	March 7	Edmonton	2–4	Columbus		Pickard	17,718	38–21–2	78
62	March 9	Edmonton	2–3	Buffalo	SO	Skinner	19,070	38–21–3	79
63	March 10	Edmonton	4–0	Pittsburgh		Pickard	17,753	39–21–3	81
64	March 13	Washington	2–7	Edmonton		Skinner	18,347	40–21–3	83
65	March 16	Colorado	3–2	Edmonton	OT	Skinner	18,347	40–21–4	84
66	March 19	Montreal	2–3	Edmonton	OT	Pickard	18,347	41–21–4	86
67	March 21	Buffalo	3–8	Edmonton		Skinner	18,347	42–21–4	88
68	March 23	Edmonton	3–6	Toronto		Skinner	19,342	42–22–4	88
69	March 24	Edmonton	3–5	Ottawa		Pickard	19,344	42–23–4	88
70	March 26	Edmonton	4–3	Winnipeg	OT	Skinner	15,225	43–23–4	90
71	March 28	Los Angeles	1–4	Edmonton		Skinner	18,347	44–23–4	92
72	March 30	Anaheim	1–6	Edmonton		Pickard	18,347	45–23–4	94

April: 4–4–2 (Home: 3–1–1; Road: 1–3–1)
#	Date	Visitor	Score	Home	OT	Decision	Attendance	Record	Points	Recap
73	April 1	Edmonton	2–3	St. Louis	OT	Skinner	18,096	45–23–5	95
74	April 3	Edmonton	0–5	Dallas		Pickard	18,532	45–24–5	95
75	April 5	Colorado	2–6	Edmonton		Skinner	18,347	46–24–5	97
76	April 6	Edmonton	4–2	Calgary		Pickard	19,289	47–24–5	99
77	April 10	Vegas	1–5	Edmonton		Skinner	18,347	48–24–5	101
78	April 12	Arizona	3–2	Edmonton	OT	Pickard	18,347	48–24–6	102
79	April 13	Vancouver	3–1	Edmonton		Skinner	18,347	48–25–6	102
80	April 15	San Jose	2–9	Edmonton		Skinner	18,347	49–25–6	104
81	April 17	Edmonton	2–5	Arizona		Pickard	4,600	49–26–6	104
82	April 18	Edmonton	1–5	Colorado		Skinner	18,129	49–27–6	104

Legend: Win (2 points) Loss (0 points) Overtime/shootout loss (1 point)

=== Playoffs ===
2024 Stanley Cup Playoffs

Western Conference first round vs. (P3) Los Angeles Kings: Edmonton won 4–1
#	Date	Visitor	Score	Home	OT	Decision	Attendance	Series	Recap
1	April 22	Los Angeles	4–7	Edmonton		Skinner	18,347	1–0
2	April 24	Los Angeles	5–4	Edmonton	OT	Skinner	18,347	1–1
3	April 26	Edmonton	6–1	Los Angeles		Skinner	18,145	2–1
4	April 28	Edmonton	1–0	Los Angeles		Skinner	18,145	3–1
5	May 1	Los Angeles	3–4	Edmonton		Skinner	18,347	4–1

Western Conference second round vs. (P1) Vancouver Canucks: Edmonton won 4–3
#	Date	Visitor	Score	Home	OT	Decision	Attendance	Series	Recap
1	May 8	Edmonton	4–5	Vancouver		Skinner	18,823	0–1
2	May 10	Edmonton	4–3	Vancouver	OT	Skinner	18,985	1–1
3	May 12	Vancouver	4–3	Edmonton		Skinner	18,347	1–2
4	May 14	Vancouver	2–3	Edmonton		Pickard	18,347	2–2
5	May 16	Edmonton	2–3	Vancouver		Pickard	19,052	2–3
6	May 18	Vancouver	1–5	Edmonton		Skinner	18,347	3–3
7	May 20	Edmonton	3–2	Vancouver		Skinner	19,016	4–3

Western Conference final vs. (C1) Dallas Stars: Edmonton won 4–2
#	Date	Visitor	Score	Home	OT	Decision	Attendance	Series	Recap
1	May 23	Edmonton	3–2	Dallas	2OT	Skinner	18,532	1–0
2	May 25	Edmonton	1–3	Dallas		Skinner	18,532	1–1
3	May 27	Dallas	5–3	Edmonton		Skinner	18,347	1–2
4	May 29	Dallas	2–5	Edmonton		Skinner	18,347	2–2
5	May 31	Edmonton	3–1	Dallas		Skinner	18,532	3–2
6	June 2	Dallas	1–2	Edmonton		Skinner	18,347	4–2

Stanley Cup Final vs. (A1) Florida Panthers: Florida won 4–3
#	Date	Visitor	Score	Home	OT	Decision	Attendance	Series	Recap
1	June 8	Edmonton	0–3	Florida		Skinner	19,543	0–1
2	June 10	Edmonton	1–4	Florida		Skinner	19,673	0–2
3	June 13	Florida	4–3	Edmonton		Skinner	18,347	0–3
4	June 15	Florida	1–8	Edmonton		Skinner	18,347	1–3
5	June 18	Edmonton	5–3	Florida		Skinner	19,956	2–3
6	June 21	Florida	1–5	Edmonton		Skinner	18,347	3–3
7	June 24	Edmonton	1–2	Florida		Skinner	19,939	3–4

Legend: Win Loss

== Player statistics ==
=== Skaters ===
Regular season
Player	GP	G	A	Pts	+/−	PIM
Connor McDavid	76	32	100	132	+35	30
Leon Draisaitl	81	41	65	106	+26	76
Evan Bouchard	81	18	64	82	+34	32
Zach Hyman	80	54	23	77	+36	48
Ryan Nugent-Hopkins	80	18	49	67	+10	36
Mattias Ekholm	79	11	34	45	+44	47
Evander Kane	77	24	20	44	−4	85
Warren Foegele	82	20	21	41	+3	47
Darnell Nurse	81	10	22	32	+3	79
Ryan McLeod	81	12	18	30	+10	10
Cody Ceci	79	5	20	25	+12	14
Brett Kulak	82	3	13	16	0	30
Corey Perry^{†}	38	8	5	13	–1	34
Derek Ryan	70	5	7	12	−3	8
Mattias Janmark	71	4	8	12	0	46
Connor Brown	71	4	8	12	−8	10
Vincent Desharnais	78	1	10	11	+3	54
Sam Gagner	28	5	5	10	–2	10
Dylan Holloway	38	6	3	9	–1	29
Adam Henrique^{†}	22	6	3	9	+6	4
Sam Carrick^{†}	16	2	3	5	0	12
James Hamblin	31	2	1	3	+3	0
Adam Erne	24	1	1	2	0	9
Philip Broberg	12	0	2	2	−3	0
Troy Stecher^{†}	7	0	2	2	+4	8
Raphael Lavoie	7	0	0	0	−2	2
Philip Kemp	1	0	0	0	0	0

Playoffs
Player	GP	G	A	Pts	+/−	PIM
Connor McDavid	25	8	34	42	+12	10
Evan Bouchard	25	6	26	32	+14	22
Leon Draisaitl	25	10	21	31	0	14
Zach Hyman	25	16	6	22	+12	12
Ryan Nugent-Hopkins	25	7	15	22	−2	8
Mattias Ekholm	25	5	5	10	+9	6
Mattias Janmark	25	4	4	8	+6	12
Evander Kane	20	4	4	8	−7	37
Warren Foegele	22	3	5	8	−7	25
Brett Kulak	25	1	7	8	−3	14
Dylan Holloway	25	5	2	7	+4	8
Adam Henrique	17	4	3	7	+3	2
Darnell Nurse	25	2	4	6	−9	12
Connor Brown	19	2	4	6	+4	6
Cody Ceci	24	2	3	5	−5	0
Ryan McLeod	24	4	0	4	−7	16
Philip Broberg	10	2	1	3	+8	0
Corey Perry	19	1	2	3	−3	12
Vincent Desharnais	16	0	1	1	−9	22
Derek Ryan	19	0	1	1	−9	8
Sam Carrick	10	0	1	1	−1	12

=== Goaltenders ===
Regular season
Player	GP	GS	TOI	W	L	OT	GA	GAA	SA	SV%	SO	G	A	PIM
Stuart Skinner	59	57	3,361:21	36	16	5	147	2.62	1,553	.905	2	0	0	0
Calvin Pickard	23	20	1,296:21	12	7	1	53	2.45	581	.909	1	0	0	2
Jack Campbell	5	5	266:47	1	4	0	20	4.50	157	.873	0	0	0	0

Playoffs
Player	GP	GS	TOI	W	L	GA	GAA	SA	SV%	SO	G	A	PIM
Stuart Skinner	23	23	1,373:20	14	9	56	2.45	564	.901	1	0	1	2
Calvin Pickard	3	2	135:55	1	1	5	2.21	59	.915	0	0	0	0

^{†}Denotes player spent time with another team before joining the Oilers. Stats reflect time with the Oilers only.
^{‡}Denotes player was traded mid-season. Stats reflect time with the Oilers only.

== Awards and honours ==
=== Awards ===
Player	Award	Awarded	Ref.
Connor McDavid	NHL 1st Star of the Week (Nov. 20 – Nov. 26)	November 27, 2023	
Connor McDavid	NHL All-Star game selection	January 4, 2024	
Leon Draisaitl	NHL All-Star game selection	January 13, 2024	
Connor McDavid	NHL 2nd Star of the Week (Jan. 22 – Jan. 28)	January 29, 2024	
Connor McDavid	NHL 2nd Star of the Week (Jan. 29 – Feb. 5)	February 5, 2024	
Connor McDavid	NHL 2nd Star of the Week (Feb. 12 – Feb. 18)	February 19, 2024	
Connor McDavid	NHL 2nd Star of the Month (February)	March 1, 2024	
Connor McDavid	NHL 3rd Star of the Week (Mar. 18 – Mar. 24)	March 25, 2024	
Connor McDavid	NHL 1st Star of the Week (Mar. 25 – Mar. 31)	April 1, 2024	
Connor McDavid	NHL 1st Star of the Month (March)	April 2, 2024	

=== Milestones ===
Regular season
Player	Milestone	Reached
Ryan Nugent-Hopkins	400th NHL assist	October 14, 2023
Vincent Desharnais	1st NHL goal	October 29, 2023
Raphael Lavoie	1st NHL game	November 4, 2023
Evan Bouchard	100th NHL point	November 11, 2023
Zach Hyman	2nd NHL hat-trick	November 11, 2023
Evander Kane	7th NHL hat-trick	November 15, 2023
James Hamblin	1st NHL goal 1st NHL point	November 18, 2023
Stuart Skinner	3rd NHL shutout	November 24, 2023
James Hamblin	1st NHL assist	November 28, 2023
Zach Hyman	3rd NHL hat-trick	December 6, 2023
Mattias Janmark	500th NHL game	December 8, 2023
Stuart Skinner	4th NHL shutout	December 28, 2023
Connor McDavid	600th NHL game	December 30, 2023
Connor McDavid	900th NHL point	January 2, 2024
Zach Hyman	4th NHL hat-trick	January 6, 2024
Philip Kemp	1st NHL game	January 13, 2024
Mattias Ekholm	300th NHL point	January 16, 2024
Derek Ryan	200th NHL point	January 16, 2024
Darnell Nurse	600th NHL game	January 18, 2024
Evander Kane	600th NHL point	January 18, 2024
Calvin Pickard	5th NHL shutout	January 25, 2024
Leon Draisaitl	800th NHL point	January 27, 2024
Evander Kane	8th NHL hat-trick	February 9, 2024
Evander Kane	900th NHL game	February 10, 2024
Stuart Skinner	100th NHL game	February 10, 2024
Cody Ceci	200th NHL point	February 13, 2024
Connor McDavid	600th NHL assist	February 13, 2024
Evan Bouchard	100th NHL assist	February 13, 2024
Warren Foegele	400th NHL game	February 17, 2024
Connor Brown	500th NHL game	March 5, 2024
Mattias Ekholm	800th NHL game	March 7, 2024
Leon Draisaitl	700th NHL game	March 9, 2024
Ryan McLeod	200th NHL game	March 10, 2024
Zach Hyman	5th NHL hat-trick	March 13, 2024
Corey Perry	900th NHL point	March 16, 2024
Vincent Desharnais	100th NHL game	March 23, 2024
Adam Henrique	900th NHL game	March 26, 2024
Zach Hyman	200th NHL goal	March 26, 2024
Corey Perry	1,300th NHL game	March 28, 2024
Leon Draisaitl	500th NHL assist	April 5, 2024
Brett Kulak	100th NHL point	April 18, 2024

Playoffs
Player	Milestone	Reached
Sam Carrick	1st NHL playoff game	April 22, 2024
Zach Hyman	1st NHL playoff hat-trick	April 22, 2024
Dylan Holloway	1st NHL playoff goal 1st NHL playoff point	April 24, 2024
Sam Carrick	1st NHL playoff assist 1st NHL playoff point	April 24, 2024
Corey Perry	200th NHL playoff game	April 28, 2024
Stuart Skinner	1st NHL playoff shutout	April 28, 2024
Calvin Pickard	1st NHL playoff game	May 12, 2024
Calvin Pickard	1st NHL playoff win	May 14, 2024
Leon Draisaitl	100th NHL playoff point	May 18, 2024
Dylan Holloway	1st NHL playoff assist	May 20, 2024
Mattias Ekholm	100th NHL playoff game	May 23, 2024
Connor McDavid	100th NHL playoff point	May 27, 2024
Philip Broberg	1st NHL playoff goal 1st NHL playoff point	May 31, 2024
Stuart Skinner	1st NHL playoff assist	June 21, 2024
Philip Broberg	1st NHL playoff assist	June 21, 2024

== Transactions ==
The Oilers have been involved in the following transactions during the 2023–24 season.

Key:

† Contract is entry-level.
‡ Contract initially takes effect in the 2024–25 season.

=== Trades ===
Date	Details		Ref
March 6, 2024	To Anaheim Ducks 1st-round pick in 2024 conditional 4th-round pick in 2025	To Edmonton Oilers Ty Taylor; Sam Carrick; 7th-round pick in 2024	
March 6, 2024	To Tampa Bay Lightning conditional 5th-round pick in 2025	To Edmonton Oilers Adam Henrique	
March 7, 2024	To Arizona Coyotes 4th-round pick in 2027	To Edmonton Oilers Troy Stecher; 7th-round pick in 2024	

=== Players acquired ===
Date	Player	Former team	Term	Via	Ref
July 1, 2023	Connor Brown	Washington Capitals	1-year	Free agency	
July 1, 2023	Drake Caggiula	Pittsburgh Penguins	2-year	Free agency	
July 1, 2023	Noel Hoefenmayer	Toronto Marlies (AHL)	1-year†	Free agency	
July 1, 2023	Lane Pederson	Columbus Blue Jackets	2-year	Free agency	
July 2, 2023	Ben Gleason	Dallas Stars	2-year	Free agency	
October 13, 2023	Adam Erne	Detroit Red Wings	1-year	Free agency	
October 31, 2023	Sam Gagner	Bakersfield Condors (AHL)	1-year	Free agency	
January 22, 2024	Corey Perry	Chicago Blackhawks	1-year	Free agency	
March 18, 2024	Connor Ungar	Brock Badgers (U Sports)	2-year†‡	Free agency	
March 21, 2024	James Stefan	Portland Winterhawks (WHL)	3-year†‡	Free agency	

=== Players lost ===
Date	Player	New team	Term	Via	Ref
July 1, 2023	Nick Bjugstad	Arizona Coyotes	2-year	Free agency	
July 10, 2023	Tyler Benson	Henderson Silver Knights (AHL)	1-year	Free agency	
August 31, 2023	Devin Shore	Seattle Kraken	1-year	Free agency	
November 27, 2023	Justin Bailey	San Jose Sharks	1-year	Free agency	
April 27, 2024	Brad Malone			Retirement	
May 22, 2024	Seth Griffith	Bakersfield Condors (AHL)	2-year	Free agency	
June 30, 2024	Jack Campbell			Buyout	

=== Signings ===
Date	Player	Term	Ref
July 4, 2023	Olivier Rodrigue	1-year	
July 15, 2023	Raphael Lavoie	1-year	
August 2, 2023	Ryan McLeod	2-year	
August 24, 2023	Evan Bouchard	2-year	
October 5, 2023	Brady Stonehouse	3-year†	
October 10, 2023	Beau Akey	3-year†	
March 30, 2024	Olivier Rodrigue	1-year‡	
June 28, 2024	Cam Dineen	2-year‡	
June 28, 2024	Calvin Pickard	2-year‡	

== Draft picks ==
Below are the Edmonton Oilers' selections at the 2023 NHL entry draft, which were held on June 28 to 29, 2023. It was held at the Bridgestone Arena in Nashville, Tennessee.

Round	#	Player	Pos	Nationality	College/Junior/Club team (League)
2	56	Beau Akey	D	Canada	Barrie Colts (OHL)
6	184	Nathaniel Day	G	Canada	Flint Firebirds (OHL)
7	216	Matt Copponi	C	United States	Merrimack Warriors (HE)
