= 2023–24 Seattle Kraken season =

National Hockey League season

2023–24 Seattle Kraken
- Division: 6th Pacific
- Conference: 12th Western
- 2023–24 record: 34–35–13
- Home record: 17–18–6
- Road record: 17–17–7
- Goals for: 217
- Goals against: 236

Team information
- General manager: Ron Francis
- Coach: Dave Hakstol
- Captain: Vacant
- Alternate captains: Jordan Eberle; Yanni Gourde; Adam Larsson; Jaden Schwartz
- Arena: Climate Pledge Arena
- Average attendance: 17,151
- Minor league affiliates: Coachella Valley Firebirds (AHL); Kansas City Mavericks (ECHL)

Team leaders
- Goals: Jared McCann (29)
- Assists: Oliver Bjorkstrand (39)
- Points: Jared McCann (62)
- Penalty minutes: Vince Dunn (78)
- Plus/minus: Vince Dunn; Tomas Tatar (+8)
- Wins: Joey Daccord (19)
- Goals against average: Joey Daccord (2.46)

The 2023–24 Seattle Kraken season was the third season for the National Hockey League (NHL) franchise. They played their home games at Climate Pledge Arena.

During the season, the Kraken played in the 2024 Winter Classic, winning 3–0 against the Vegas Golden Knights at T-Mobile Park on January 1, 2024, achieving the first shutout in Winter Classic history.

On April 3, the Kraken were eliminated from playoff contention after a 5–2 loss to the Los Angeles Kings.

On April 29, following the season, Kraken head coach Dave Hakstol was fired, being replaced by Coachella Valley Firebirds head coach Dan Bylsma on May 28.

== Standings ==
=== Divisional standings ===
Pacific Division
Pos	Team	GP	W	L	OTL	RW	GF	GA	GD	Pts
1	y – Vancouver Canucks	82	50	23	9	44	279	223	+56	109
2	x – Edmonton Oilers	82	49	27	6	39	294	237	+57	104
3	x – Los Angeles Kings	82	44	27	11	37	256	215	+41	99
4	x – Vegas Golden Knights	82	45	29	8	34	267	245	+22	98
5	Calgary Flames	82	38	39	5	32	253	271	−18	81
6	Seattle Kraken	82	34	35	13	28	217	236	−19	81
7	Anaheim Ducks	82	27	50	5	21	204	295	−91	59
8	San Jose Sharks	82	19	54	9	14	181	331	−150	47

Source: National Hockey League
Rules for classification: 1) Fewer number of games played (GP, only during regular season); 2) Greater number of regulation wins (RW); 3) Greater number of wins in regulation and overtime, excluding shootout wins (ROW); 4) Greater number of total wins, including shootouts (W); 5) Greater number of points earned in head-to-head play; if teams played an uneven number of head-to-head games, the result of the first game on the home ice of the team with the extra home game is discarded; 6) Greater goal differential (GD); 7) Greater number of goals scored (GF)
x – Clinched playoff spot; y – Clinched division

=== Conference standings ===
Western Conference Wild Card
Pos	Div	Team	GP	W	L	OTL	RW	GF	GA	GD	Pts
1	CE	x – Nashville Predators	82	47	30	5	38	269	248	+21	99
2	PA	x – Vegas Golden Knights	82	45	29	8	34	267	245	+22	98
3	CE	St. Louis Blues	82	43	33	6	31	239	250	−11	92
4	CE	Minnesota Wild	82	39	34	9	32	251	263	−12	87
5	PA	Calgary Flames	82	38	39	5	32	253	271	−18	81
6	PA	Seattle Kraken	82	34	35	13	28	217	236	−19	81
7	CE	Arizona Coyotes	82	36	41	5	28	256	274	−18	77
8	PA	Anaheim Ducks	82	27	50	5	21	204	295	−91	59
9	CE	Chicago Blackhawks	82	23	53	6	17	179	290	−111	52
10	PA	San Jose Sharks	82	19	54	9	14	181	331	−150	47

Source: National Hockey League
Rules for classification: 1) Fewer number of games played (GP, only during regular season); 2) Greater number of regulation wins (RW); 3) Greater number of wins in regulation and overtime, excluding shootout wins (ROW); 4) Greater number of total wins, including shootouts (W); 5) Greater number of points earned in head-to-head play; if teams played an uneven number of head-to-head games, the result of the first game on the home ice of the team with the extra home game is discarded; 6) Greater goal differential (GD); 7) Greater number of goals scored (GF)
x – Clinched playoff spot

== Schedule and results ==
=== Preseason ===
The preseason schedule was released on June 23, 2023.

2023 preseason game log: 3–2–1 (home: 1–1–1; road: 2–1–0)
#	Date	Visitor	Score	Home	OT	Decision	Attendance	Record	Recap
1	September 25^{[A]}	Seattle	5–3	Calgary		Stezka	15,205	1–0–0
2	September 25^{[A]}	Calgary	3–2	Seattle	SO	Daccord	10,000	1–0–1
3	September 28	Vancouver	1–3	Seattle		Daccord	17,151	2–0–1
4	October 2	Edmonton	4–1	Seattle		Grubauer	17,151	2–1–1
5	October 4	Seattle	2–1	Vancouver		Driedger	6,563	3–1–1
6	October 6	Seattle	1–3	Edmonton		Grubauer	18,141	3–2–1
Notes:^{A} Indicates split-squad.

=== Regular season ===
The regular season schedule was released on June 27, 2023.

2023–24 game log

October: 3–5–2 (home: 1–2–0; road: 2–3–2)
#	Date	Visitor	Score	Home	OT	Decision	Attendance	Record	Pts	Recap
1	October 10	Seattle	1–4	Vegas		Grubauer	18,724	0–1–0	0
2	October 12	Seattle	0–3	Nashville		Grubauer	17,629	0–2–0	0
3	October 14	Seattle	1–2	St. Louis	SO	Daccord	18,096	0–2–1	1
4	October 17	Colorado	4–1	Seattle		Grubauer	17,151	0–3–1	1
5	October 19	Carolina	4–7	Seattle		Daccord	17,151	1–3–1	3
6	October 21	NY Rangers	4–1	Seattle		Grubauer	17,151	1–4–1	3
7	October 24	Seattle	5–4	Detroit	OT	Daccord	16,894	2–4–1	5
8	October 26	Seattle	2–3	Carolina	OT	Daccord	18,780	2–4–2	6
9	October 28	Seattle	2–3	Florida		Daccord	16,780	2–5–2	6
10	October 30	Seattle	4–3	Tampa Bay	OT	Grubauer	19,092	3–5–2	8

November: 5–5–4 (home: 3–4–1; road: 2–1–3)
#	Date	Visitor	Score	Home	OT	Decision	Attendance	Record	Pts	Recap
11	November 2	Nashville	2–4	Seattle		Grubauer	17,151	4–5–2	10
12	November 4	Calgary	6–3	Seattle		Grubauer	17,151	4–6–2	10
13	November 7	Seattle	3–4	Arizona	SO	Daccord	4,600	4–6–3	11
14	November 9	Seattle	4–3	Colorado		Grubauer	18,124	5–6–3	13
15	November 11	Edmonton	4–1	Seattle		Grubauer	17,151	5–7–3	13
16	November 13	Colorado	5–1	Seattle		Daccord	17,151	5–8–3	13
17	November 15	Seattle	3–4	Edmonton	OT	Daccord	18,347	5–8–4	14
18	November 16	NY Islanders	3–4	Seattle	SO	Grubauer	17,151	6–8–4	16
19	November 18	Seattle	4–3	Vancouver		Grubauer	18,857	7–8–4	18
20	November 20	Calgary	4–3	Seattle	OT	Daccord	17,151	7–8–5	19
21	November 22	San Jose	1–7	Seattle		Daccord	17,151	8–8–5	21
22	November 24	Vancouver	5–1	Seattle		Daccord	17,151	8–9–5	21
23	November 28	Seattle	3–4	Chicago		Grubauer	17,070	8–10–5	21
24	November 30	Seattle	3–4	Toronto	SO	Grubauer	18,366	8–10–6	22

December: 6–4–3 (home: 3–2–2; road: 3–2–1)
#	Date	Visitor	Score	Home	OT	Decision	Attendance	Record	Pts	Recap
25	December 2	Seattle	0–2	Ottawa		Daccord	18,159	8–11–6	22
26	December 4	Seattle	2–4	Montreal		Grubauer	20,915	8–12–6	22
27	December 7	New Jersey	2–1	Seattle		Grubauer	17,151	8–13–6	22
28	December 9	Tampa Bay	4–3	Seattle	OT	Grubauer	17,151	8–13–7	23
29	December 10	Minnesota	3–0	Seattle		Daccord	17,151	8–14–7	23
30	December 12	Florida	0–4	Seattle		Daccord	17,151	9–14–7	25
31	December 14	Chicago	1–7	Seattle		Daccord	17,151	10–14–7	27
32	December 16	Los Angeles	3–2	Seattle	SO	Daccord	17,151	10–14–8	28
33	December 18	Seattle	3–4	Dallas	OT	Daccord	18,532	10–14–9	29
34	December 20	Seattle	2–1	Los Angeles		Daccord	18,145	11–14–9	31
35	December 23	Seattle	3–2	Anaheim		Daccord	14,608	12–14–9	33
36	December 27	Seattle	2–1	Calgary		Driedger	18,881	13–14–9	35
37	December 29	Philadelphia	1–2	Seattle	OT	Daccord	17,151	14–14–9	37

January: 7–5–1 (home: 4–1–1; road: 3–4–0)
#	Date	Visitor	Score	Home	OT	Decision	Attendance	Record	Pts	Recap
38	January 1	Vegas	0–3	Seattle		Daccord	47,313 (outdoors)	15–14–9	39
39	January 4	Ottawa	1–4	Seattle		Daccord	17,151	16–14–9	41
40	January 9	Seattle	5–2	Buffalo		Daccord	14,628	17–14–9	43
41	January 11	Seattle	4–1	Washington		Daccord	17,935	18–14–9	45
42	January 13	Seattle	7–4	Columbus		Daccord	18,588	19–14–9	47
43	January 15	Seattle	0–3	Pittsburgh		Daccord	18,202	19–15–9	47
44	January 16	Seattle	2–5	NY Rangers		Driedger	18,006	19–16–9	47
45	January 18	Seattle	2–4	Edmonton		Daccord	18,347	19–17–9	47
46	January 21	Toronto	3–1	Seattle		Daccord	17,151	19–18–9	47
47	January 24	Chicago	2–6	Seattle		Daccord	17,151	20–18–9	49
48	January 26	St. Louis	4–3	Seattle	OT	Daccord	17,151	20–18–10	50
49	January 28	Columbus	2–4	Seattle		Daccord	17,151	21–18–10	52
50	January 30	Seattle	0–2	San Jose		Daccord	10,988	21–19–10	52

February: 5–3–1 (home: 3–1–1; road: 2–2–0)
#	Date	Visitor	Score	Home	OT	Decision	Attendance	Record	Pts	Recap
51	February 10	Seattle	2–3	Philadelphia		Daccord	18,926	21–20–10	52
52	February 12	Seattle	1–3	New Jersey		Daccord	14,511	21–21–10	52
53	February 13	Seattle	2–1	NY Islanders	SO	Grubauer	17,255	22–21–10	54
54	February 15	Seattle	4–1	Boston		Daccord	17,850	23–21–10	56
55	February 19	Detroit	4–3	Seattle	OT	Daccord	17,151	23–21–11	57
56	February 22	Vancouver	2–5	Seattle		Grubauer	17,151	24–21–11	59
57	February 24	Minnesota	5–2	Seattle		Daccord	17,151	24–22–11	59
58	February 26	Boston	3–4	Seattle	SO	Grubauer	17,151	25–22–11	61
59	February 29	Pittsburgh	0–2	Seattle		Grubauer	17,151	26–22–11	63

March: 4–8–2 (home: 2–7–1; road: 2–1–1)
#	Date	Visitor	Score	Home	OT	Decision	Attendance	Record	Pts	Recap
60	March 2	Edmonton	2–1	Seattle		Grubauer	17,151	26–23–11	63
61	March 4	Seattle	4–2	Calgary		Grubauer	16,516	27–23–11	65
62	March 5	Seattle	4–3	Winnipeg		Daccord	13,125	28–23–11	67
63	March 8	Winnipeg	3–0	Seattle		Daccord	17,151	28–24–11	67
64	March 12	Vegas	5–4	Seattle	OT	Grubauer	17,151	28–24–12	68
65	March 14	Washington	2–1	Seattle		Daccord	17,151	28–25–12	68
66	March 16	Nashville	4–1	Seattle		Grubauer	17,151	28–26–12	68
67	March 18	Buffalo	6–2	Seattle		Daccord	17,151	28–27–12	68
68	March 21	Seattle	1–3	Vegas		Grubauer	18,033	28–28–12	68
69	March 22	Seattle	1–2	Arizona	OT	Daccord	4,600	28–28–13	69
70	March 24	Montreal	5–1	Seattle		Grubauer	17,151	28–29–13	69
71	March 26	Anaheim	0–4	Seattle		Daccord	17,151	29–29–13	71
72	March 28	Anaheim	2–4	Seattle		Grubauer	17,151	30–29–13	73
73	March 30	Dallas	3–0	Seattle		Daccord	17,151	30–30–13	73

April: 4–5–0 (home: 1–1–0; road: 3–4–0)
#	Date	Visitor	Score	Home	OT	Decision	Attendance	Record	Pts	Recap
74	April 1	Seattle	4–2	San Jose		Grubauer	11,559	31–30–13	75
75	April 3	Seattle	2–5	Los Angeles		Grubauer	18,145	31–31–13	75
76	April 5	Seattle	3–1	Anaheim		Grubauer	17,174	32–31–13	77
77	April 9	Arizona	0–5	Seattle		Grubauer	17,151	33–31–13	79
78	April 11	San Jose	3–1	Seattle		Daccord	17,151	33–32–13	79
79	April 13	Seattle	1–3	Dallas		Grubauer	18,532	33–33–13	79
80	April 14	Seattle	1–4	St. Louis		Daccord	18,096	33–34–13	79
81	April 16	Seattle	3–4	Winnipeg		Grubauer	15,225	33–35–13	79
82	April 18	Seattle	4–3	Minnesota		Daccord	19,138	34–35–13	81

Legend: Win (2 points) Loss (0 points) Overtime/shootout loss (1 point)

== Player statistics ==
=== Skaters ===
Regular season
Player	GP	G	A	Pts	+/−	PIM
Jared McCann	80	29	33	62	−10	31
Oliver Bjorkstrand	82	20	39	59	−20	12
Vince Dunn	59	11	35	46	+8	78
Jordan Eberle	78	17	27	44	+1	17
Eeli Tolvanen	81	16	25	41	−15	24
Matty Beniers	77	15	22	37	−11	20
Yanni Gourde	80	11	22	33	−11	62
Jaden Schwartz	62	13	17	30	−15	24
Justin Schultz	70	7	19	26	−23	22
Alexander Wennberg^{‡}	60	9	16	25	+1	14
Will Borgen	82	3	22	25	−5	65
Tye Kartye	77	11	9	20	−1	37
Adam Larsson	81	4	14	18	+6	55
Kailer Yamamoto	59	8	8	16	−9	18
Brandon Tanev	66	7	9	16	+2	51
Andre Burakovsky	49	7	9	16	−15	14
Brian Dumoulin	80	6	10	16	+3	20
Tomas Tatar^{†}	43	8	7	15	+8	10
Jamie Oleksiak	82	2	13	15	−2	37
Ryker Evans	36	1	8	9	−5	20
Pierre-Edouard Bellemare	40	4	3	7	+4	6
Shane Wright	8	4	1	5	+1	0
Devin Shore	21	1	3	4	+3	4
Logan Morrison	4	0	0	0	−1	0
Ryan Winterton	9	0	0	0	−1	0
Marian Studenic	2	0	0	0	−1	2
Kole Lind	1	0	0	0	0	0
Cale Fleury	1	0	0	0	+1	0
Andrew Poturalski	2	0	0	0	−1	0
Gustav Olofsson	1	0	0	0	0	0
John Hayden	2	0	0	0	−1	0
Max McCormick	1	0	0	0	0	0

=== Goaltenders ===
Regular season
Player	GP	GS	TOI	W	L	OT	GA	GAA	SA	SV%	SO	G	A	PIM
Joey Daccord	50	46	2,832:47	19	18	11	116	2.46	1,374	.916	3	0	0	0
Philipp Grubauer	36	34	1,996:36	14	16	2	95	2.85	941	.899	2	0	1	4
Chris Driedger	2	2	119:35	1	1	0	5	2.51	60	.917	0	0	0	0

^{†}Denotes player spent time with another team before joining the Kraken. Stats reflect time with the Kraken only.
^{‡}Denotes player was traded mid-season. Stats reflect time with the Kraken only.

== Transactions ==
The Kraken have been involved in the following transactions during the 2023–24 season.

Key:

† Contract is entry-level.
‡ Contract initially takes effect in the 2024–25 season.

=== Trades ===
Date	Details		Ref
December 16, 2023	To Colorado Avalanche 5th-round pick in 2024	To Seattle Kraken Tomas Tatar	
March 6, 2024	To New York Rangers Alexander Wennberg^{[a]}	To Seattle Kraken 2nd-round pick in 2024; 4th-round pick in 2025	
June 29, 2024	To Florida Panthers 6th-round pick in 2024; 7th-round pick in 2024	To Seattle Kraken 5th-round pick in 2024	

Notes:

- ^{a} Seattle retains 50% of Wennberg's remaining contract.

=== Free agents acquired ===
Date	Player	Former team	Term	Ref
July 1, 2023	Brian Dumoulin	Pittsburgh Penguins	2-year	
July 1, 2023	Marian Studenic	Dallas Stars	1-year	
July 2, 2023	Kailer Yamamoto	Detroit Red Wings	1-year	
July 8, 2023	Pierre-Edouard Bellemare	Tampa Bay Lightning	1-year	

=== Free agents lost ===
Date	Player	New team	Ref
July 1, 2023	Ryan Donato	Chicago Blackhawks	
July 1, 2023	Daniel Sprong	Detroit Red Wings	
July 1, 2023	Carson Soucy	Vancouver Canucks	
August 9, 2023	Martin Jones	Toronto Maple Leafs	

=== Lost via waivers ===
Date	Player	New team	Ref
January 3, 2024	Jaycob Megna	Chicago Blackhawks	

=== Lost via retirement ===
Date	Player	Ref
August 27, 2023	Joonas Donskoi	

=== Other signings ===
Date	Player	Term	Ref
July 1, 2023	John Hayden	1-year	
July 1, 2023	Jimmy Schuldt	1-year	
July 3, 2023	Connor Carrick	1-year	
July 6, 2023	Tucker Robertson	3-year†	
July 8, 2023	Will Borgen	2-year	
July 8, 2023	Kole Lind	1-year	
July 9, 2023	Cale Fleury	2-year	
July 17, 2023	Eduard Sale	3-year†	
July 21, 2023	Vince Dunn	4-year	
March 8, 2024	Jordan Eberle	2-year	
March 26, 2024	Lleyton Roed	3-year†	
March 27, 2024	Lukas Dragicevic	3-year†	
April 3, 2024	Victor Ostman	2-year†‡	
April 21, 2024	Carson Rehkopf	3-year†	
April 24, 2024	Caden Price	3-year†	
June 14, 2024	Oscar Fisker Molgaard	3-year†	
June 30, 2024	John Hayden	1-year	
June 30, 2024	Luke Henman	1-year†	
June 30, 2024	Ales Stezka	1-year†	
June 30, 2024	Max McCormick	2-year†	

== Draft picks ==
Below are the Seattle Krakens' selections at the 2023 NHL entry draft, which was held on June 28 and 29, 2023, in Nashville, Tennessee.

Round	#	Player	Pos	Nationality	College/Junior/Club (League)
1	20	Eduard Sale	LW	Czechia	HC Kometa Brno (ELH)
2	50 (Note: The Winnipeg Jets' second-round pick will go to the Seattle Kraken as the result of a trade on July 28, 2021, that sent Vitek Vanecek to Washington in exchange for this pick. Washington previously acquired this pick as the result of a trade on July 26, 2021, that sent Brenden Dillon to Winnipeg in exchange for a second-round pick in 2022 and this pick.)	Carson Rehkopf	LW	Canada	Kitchener Rangers (OHL)
2	52	Oscar Fisker Molgaard	C	Denmark	HV71 (SHL)
2	57 (Note: The Toronto Maple Leafs' second-round pick will go to the Seattle Kraken as the result of a trade on March 20, 2022, that sent Mark Giordano and Colin Blackwell to Toronto in exchange for a second-round pick in 2022, a third-round pick in 2024 and this pick.)	Lukas Dragicevic	D	Canada	Tri-City Americans (WHL)
3	84	Caden Price	D	Canada	Kelowna Rockets (WHL)
4	116	Andrei Loshko	C	Belarus	Chicoutimi Saguenéens (QMJHL)
5	148	Kaden Hammell	D	Canada	Everett Silvertips (WHL)
6	168 (Note: The Washington Capitals' sixth-round pick will go to the Seattle Kraken as the result of a trade on March 21, 2022, that sent Marcus Johansson to Washington in exchange for Daniel Sprong, a fourth-round pick in 2022 and this pick.)	Visa Vedenpaa	G	Finland	Oulun Kärpät (U20 SM-sarja)
6	180	Zeb Forsfjall	C	Sweden	Skellefteå AIK (J20 Nationell)
7	212	Zaccharya Wisdom	RW	Canada	Cedar Rapids RoughRiders (USHL)
