= 2023–24 Arizona Coyotes season =

National Hockey League season

2023–24 Arizona Coyotes
- Division: 7th Central
- Conference: 13th Western
- 2023–24 record: 36–41–5
- Home record: 22–19–0
- Road record: 14–22–5
- Goals for: 256
- Goals against: 274

Team information
- General manager: Bill Armstrong
- Coach: Andre Tourigny
- Captain: Vacant
- Alternate captains: Lawson Crouse; Clayton Keller; Nick Schmaltz
- Arena: Mullett Arena
- Average attendance: 4,600
- Minor league affiliate: Tucson Roadrunners (AHL)

Team leaders
- Goals: Clayton Keller (33)
- Assists: Clayton Keller (43)
- Points: Clayton Keller (76)
- Penalty minutes: Liam O'Brien (153)
- Plus/minus: Juuso Valimaki (+12)
- Wins: Connor Ingram (23)
- Goals against average: Connor Ingram (2.91)

The 2023–24 Arizona Coyotes season was the 28th season for the National Hockey League (NHL) franchise that was established in 1996 and final overall season for the original Coyotes organization. It was also their second and final season playing their home games at Mullett Arena, which held the distinction of being the smallest venue in the National Hockey League based on seating capacity in the modern 21st century era, accommodating just 4,600 spectators at maximum capacity.

On March 26, 2024, the Coyotes were eliminated from playoff contention following a 5–4 overtime win by the Nashville Predators against the Vegas Golden Knights. In the closing days of the season, it was reported in numerous sources that the Coyotes organization would be transferred to an expansion franchise the league was planning to award to Utah-based businessman Ryan Smith, with the intention of relocating the Coyotes' hockey assets (but not the actual Coyotes franchise itself) to Salt Lake City.

The transaction was finalized on April 18, 2024, the day after Arizona's season-ending 5–2 win over the eventual Western Conference champion Edmonton Oilers, with the Coyotes franchise having officially been recognized as having suspended hockey operations since that day. Under the terms of the agreement with then-current owner Alex Meruelo, if a new arena that is considered suitable for the NHL is built within five years, the franchise is expected to be reactivated, thus retaining the names, rights, and trademarks to the Coyotes logo, name, and brand in the process of it all. However, two months later in June, the auction was canceled, and Meruelo left ownership, thus making the franchise inactive.

== Standings ==
=== Divisional standings ===
Central Division
| Pos | Team | GP | W | L | OTL | RW | GF | GA | GD | Pts |
|---|---|---|---|---|---|---|---|---|---|---|
| 1 | z – Dallas Stars | 82 | 52 | 21 | 9 | 40 | 298 | 234 | +64 | 113 |
| 2 | x – Winnipeg Jets | 82 | 52 | 24 | 6 | 46 | 259 | 199 | +60 | 110 |
| 3 | x – Colorado Avalanche | 82 | 50 | 25 | 7 | 42 | 304 | 254 | +50 | 107 |
| 4 | x – Nashville Predators | 82 | 47 | 30 | 5 | 38 | 269 | 248 | +21 | 99 |
| 5 | St. Louis Blues | 82 | 43 | 33 | 6 | 31 | 239 | 250 | −11 | 92 |
| 6 | Minnesota Wild | 82 | 39 | 34 | 9 | 32 | 251 | 263 | −12 | 87 |
| 7 | Arizona Coyotes | 82 | 36 | 41 | 5 | 28 | 256 | 274 | −18 | 77 |
| 8 | Chicago Blackhawks | 82 | 23 | 53 | 6 | 17 | 179 | 290 | −111 | 52 |

Source: National Hockey League
Rules for classification: 1) Fewer number of games played (GP, only during regular season); 2) Greater number of regulation wins (RW); 3) Greater number of wins in regulation and overtime, excluding shootout wins (ROW); 4) Greater number of total wins, including shootouts (W); 5) Greater number of points earned in head-to-head play; if teams played an uneven number of head-to-head games, the result of the first game on the home ice of the team with the extra home game is discarded; 6) Greater goal differential (GD); 7) Greater number of goals scored (GF)
x – Clinched playoff spot; z – Clinched conference

=== Conference standings ===
Western Conference Wild Card
| Pos | Div | Team | GP | W | L | OTL | RW | GF | GA | GD | Pts |
|---|---|---|---|---|---|---|---|---|---|---|---|
| 1 | CE | x – Nashville Predators | 82 | 47 | 30 | 5 | 38 | 269 | 248 | +21 | 99 |
| 2 | PA | x – Vegas Golden Knights | 82 | 45 | 29 | 8 | 34 | 267 | 245 | +22 | 98 |
| 3 | CE | St. Louis Blues | 82 | 43 | 33 | 6 | 31 | 239 | 250 | −11 | 92 |
| 4 | CE | Minnesota Wild | 82 | 39 | 34 | 9 | 32 | 251 | 263 | −12 | 87 |
| 5 | PA | Calgary Flames | 82 | 38 | 39 | 5 | 32 | 253 | 271 | −18 | 81 |
| 6 | PA | Seattle Kraken | 82 | 34 | 35 | 13 | 28 | 217 | 236 | −19 | 81 |
| 7 | CE | Arizona Coyotes | 82 | 36 | 41 | 5 | 28 | 256 | 274 | −18 | 77 |
| 8 | PA | Anaheim Ducks | 82 | 27 | 50 | 5 | 21 | 204 | 295 | −91 | 59 |
| 9 | CE | Chicago Blackhawks | 82 | 23 | 53 | 6 | 17 | 179 | 290 | −111 | 52 |
| 10 | PA | San Jose Sharks | 82 | 19 | 54 | 9 | 14 | 181 | 331 | −150 | 47 |

Source: National Hockey League
Rules for classification: 1) Fewer number of games played (GP, only during regular season); 2) Greater number of regulation wins (RW); 3) Greater number of wins in regulation and overtime, excluding shootout wins (ROW); 4) Greater number of total wins, including shootouts (W); 5) Greater number of points earned in head-to-head play; if teams played an uneven number of head-to-head games, the result of the first game on the home ice of the team with the extra home game is discarded; 6) Greater goal differential (GD); 7) Greater number of goals scored (GF)
x – Clinched playoff spot

== Schedule and results ==
=== Preseason ===
The team's preseason schedule was released on June 20, 2023.

2023 preseason game log: 4–5–0 (Home: 3–1–0; Road: 1–4–0)

| # | Date | Visitor | Score | Home | Decision | Location | Attendance | Record |
|---|---|---|---|---|---|---|---|---|
| 1^{A} | September 23 | Los Angeles | 3–5 | Arizona | Ingram | Rod Laver Arena | 13,097 | 1–0–0 |
| 2^{F} | September 23 | Arizona | 2–3 | St. Louis | Villalta | Enterprise Center | 16,314 | 1–1–0 |
| 3^{B} ^{F} | September 23 | St. Louis | 1–5 | Arizona | Prosvetov | Intrust Bank Arena | 6,324 | 2–1–0 |
| 4^{A} | September 24 | Arizona | 2–3 | Los Angeles | Vejmelka | Rod Laver Arena | 13,118 | 2–2–0 |
| 5^{C} | September 24 | Arizona | 0–7 | Dallas | Prosvetov | H-E-B Center at Cedar Park | — | 2–3–0 |
| 6 | September 29 | Arizona | 1–3 | Vegas | Ingram | T-Mobile Arena | 17,501 | 2–4–0 |
| 7^{D} | October 1 | Anaheim | 5–4 | Arizona | Vejmelka | Acrisure Arena | 7,545 | 2–5–0 |
| 8 | October 5 | Arizona | 4–2 | Anaheim | Ingram | Honda Center | 10,878 | 3–5–0 |
| 9^{E} | October 7 | Anaheim | 1–7 | Arizona | Vejmelka | TCC Arena | 5,180 | 4–5–0 |

Legend: Win Loss OT/SO Loss ^{A} – game in Melbourne, Australia ^{B} - game in Wichita, Kansas ^{C} - game in Cedar Park, Texas ^{D} - game in Palm Springs, California ^{E} - game in Tucson, Arizona ^{F} - split squad

=== Regular season ===
The Arizona Coyotes regular season schedule was released on June 27, 2023.

2023–24 game log
October: 4–4–0 (Home: 2–1–0; Road: 2–3–0)

| # | Date | Visitor | Score | Home | OT | Decision | Location | Attendance | Record | Points | Recap |
|---|---|---|---|---|---|---|---|---|---|---|---|
| 1 | October 13 | Arizona | 4–3 | New Jersey | SO | Vejmelka | Prudential Center | 16,514 | 1–0–0 | 2 | |
| 2 | October 16 | Arizona | 1–2 | NY Rangers | | Ingram | Madison Square Garden | 18,006 | 1–1–0 | 2 | |
| 3 | October 17 | Arizona | 0–1 | NY Islanders | | Vejmelka | UBS Arena | 14,456 | 1–2–0 | 2 | |
| 4 | October 19 | Arizona | 6–2 | St. Louis | | Ingram | Enterprise Center | 18,096 | 2–2–0 | 4 | |
| 5 | October 21 | Anaheim | 1–2 | Arizona | | Vejmelka | Mullett Arena | 4,600 | 3–2–0 | 6 | |
| 6 | October 24 | Arizona | 3–6 | Los Angeles | | Vejmelka | Crypto.com Arena | 17,668 | 3–3–0 | 6 | |
| 7 | October 27 | Los Angeles | 5–4 | Arizona | | Vejmelka | Mullett Arena | 4,600 | 3–4–0 | 6 | |
| 8 | October 30 | Chicago | 1–8 | Arizona | | Ingram | Mullett Arena | 4,600 | 4–4–0 | 8 | |

November: 7–5–2 (Home: 4–3–0; Road: 3–2–2)

| # | Date | Visitor | Score | Home | OT | Decision | Location | Attendance | Record | Points | Recap |
|---|---|---|---|---|---|---|---|---|---|---|---|
| 9 | November 1 | Arizona | 3–4 | Anaheim | OT | Vejmelka | Honda Center | 14,894 | 4–4–1 | 9 | |
| 10 | November 2 | Montreal | 2–3 | Arizona | | Ingram | Mullett Arena | 4,600 | 5–4–1 | 11 | |
| 11 | November 4 | Winnipeg | 5–3 | Arizona | | Vejmelka | Mullett Arena | 4,600 | 5–5–1 | 11 | |
| 12 | November 7 | Seattle | 3–4 | Arizona | SO | Ingram | Mullett Arena | 4,600 | 6–5–1 | 13 | |
| 13 | November 9 | Arizona | 1–2 | St. Louis | | Vejmelka | Enterprise Center | 18,096 | 6–6–1 | 13 | |
| 14 | November 11 | Arizona | 7–5 | Nashville | | Ingram | Bridgestone Arena | 17,303 | 7–6–1 | 15 | |
| 15 | November 14 | Arizona | 3–4 | Dallas | OT | Vejmelka | American Airlines Center | 18,532 | 7–6–2 | 16 | |
| 16 | November 16 | Arizona | 3–2 | Columbus | | Ingram | Nationwide Arena | 15,909 | 8–6–2 | 18 | |
| 17 | November 18 | Arizona | 2–5 | Winnipeg | | Vejmelka | Canada Life Centre | 12,103 | 8–7–2 | 18 | |
| 18 | November 20 | Los Angeles | 4–1 | Arizona | | Ingram | Mullett Arena | 4,600 | 8–8–2 | 18 | |
| 19 | November 22 | St. Louis | 6–5 | Arizona | | Vejmelka | Mullett Arena | 4,600 | 8–9–2 | 18 | |
| 20 | November 25 | Arizona | 2–0 | Vegas | | Ingram | T-Mobile Arena | 18,591 | 9–9–2 | 20 | |
| 21 | November 28 | Tampa Bay | 1–3 | Arizona | | Ingram | Mullett Arena | 4,600 | 10–9–2 | 22 | |
| 22 | November 30 | Colorado | 3–4 | Arizona | OT | Ingram | Mullett Arena | 4,600 | 11–9–2 | 24 | |

December: 8–5–0 (Home: 6–1–0; Road: 2–4–0)

| # | Date | Visitor | Score | Home | OT | Decision | Location | Attendance | Record | Points | Recap |
|---|---|---|---|---|---|---|---|---|---|---|---|
| 23 | December 2 | St. Louis | 1–4 | Arizona | | Ingram | Mullett Arena | 4,600 | 12–9–2 | 26 | |
| 24 | December 4 | Washington | 0–6 | Arizona | | Ingram | Mullett Arena | 4,600 | 13–9–2 | 28 | |
| 25 | December 7 | Philadelphia | 4–1 | Arizona | | Ingram | Mullett Arena | 4,600 | 13–10–2 | 28 | |
| 26 | December 9 | Arizona | 3–5 | Boston | | Ingram | TD Garden | 17,850 | 13–11–2 | 28 | |
| 27 | December 11 | Arizona | 2–5 | Buffalo | | Vejmelka | KeyBank Center | 14,083 | 13–12–2 | 28 | |
| 28 | December 12 | Arizona | 2–4 | Pittsburgh | | Ingram | PPG Paints Arena | 17,068 | 13–13–2 | 28 | |
| 29 | December 15 | San Jose | 0–1 | Arizona | | Ingram | Mullett Arena | 4,600 | 14–13–2 | 30 | |
| 30 | December 16 | Buffalo | 0–2 | Arizona | | Vejmelka | Mullett Arena | 4,600 | 15–13–2 | 32 | |
| 31 | December 19 | Ottawa | 3–4 | Arizona | | Vejmelka | Mullett Arena | 4,600 | 16–13–2 | 34 | |
| 32 | December 21 | Arizona | 5–2 | San Jose | | Vejmelka | SAP Center | 17,435 | 17–13–2 | 36 | |
| 33 | December 23 | Arizona | 1–4 | Colorado | | Ingram | Ball Arena | 18,117 | 17–14–2 | 36 | |
| 34 | December 27 | Colorado | 4–5 | Arizona | OT | Vejmelka | Mullett Arena | 4,600 | 18–14–2 | 38 | |
| 35 | December 29 | Arizona | 2–0 | Anaheim | | Ingram | Honda Center | 16,052 | 19–14–2 | 40 | |

January: 4–8–1 (Home: 3–4–0; Road: 1–4–1)

| # | Date | Visitor | Score | Home | OT | Decision | Location | Attendance | Record | Points | Recap |
|---|---|---|---|---|---|---|---|---|---|---|---|
| 36 | January 2 | Florida | 4–1 | Arizona | | Vejmelka | Mullett Arena | 4,600 | 19–15–2 | 40 | |
| 37 | January 4 | NY Islanders | 5–1 | Arizona | | Ingram | Mullett Arena | 4,600 | 19–16–2 | 40 | |
| 38 | January 7 | Winnipeg | 6–2 | Arizona | | Vejmelka | Mullett Arena | 4,600 | 19–17–2 | 40 | |
| 39 | January 9 | Boston | 3–4 | Arizona | OT | Ingram | Mullett Arena | 4,600 | 20–17–2 | 42 | |
| 40 | January 11 | Calgary | 6–2 | Arizona | | Vejmelka | Mullett Arena | 4,600 | 20–18–2 | 42 | |
| 41 | January 13 | Arizona | 6–0 | Minnesota | | Ingram | Xcel Energy Center | 18,812 | 21–18–2 | 44 | |
| 42 | January 16 | Arizona | 2–3 | Calgary | OT | Ingram | Scotiabank Saddledome | 17,407 | 21–18–3 | 45 | |
| 43 | January 18 | Arizona | 1–2 | Vancouver | | Ingram | Rogers Arena | 19,005 | 21–19–3 | 45 | |
| 44 | January 20 | Nashville | 2–3 | Arizona | | Ingram | Mullett Arena | 4,600 | 22–19–3 | 47 | |
| 45 | January 22 | Pittsburgh | 2–5 | Arizona | | Ingram | Mullett Arena | 4,600 | 23–19–3 | 49 | |
| 46 | January 24 | Arizona | 2–6 | Florida | | Vejmelka | Amerant Bank Arena | 17,020 | 23–20–3 | 49 | |
| 47 | January 25 | Arizona | 3–6 | Tampa Bay | | Ingram | Amalie Arena | 19,092 | 23–21–3 | 49 | |
| 48 | January 27 | Arizona | 1–3 | Carolina | | Ingram | PNC Arena | 18,718 | 23–22–3 | 49 | |

February: 0–9–2 (Home: 0–5–0; Road: 0–4–2)

| # | Date | Visitor | Score | Home | OT | Decision | Location | Attendance | Record | Points | Recap |
|---|---|---|---|---|---|---|---|---|---|---|---|
| 49 | February 8 | Vegas | 3–2 | Arizona | | Ingram | Mullett Arena | 4,600 | 23–23–3 | 49 | |
| 50 | February 10 | Arizona | 4–5 | Nashville | OT | Ingram | Bridgestone Arena | 17,507 | 23–23–4 | 50 | |
| 51 | February 12 | Arizona | 3–5 | Philadelphia | | Vejmelka | Wells Fargo Center | 18,094 | 23–24–4 | 50 | |
| 52 | February 14 | Minnesota | 3–1 | Arizona | | Ingram | Mullett Arena | 4,600 | 23–25–4 | 50 | |
| 53 | February 16 | Carolina | 5–1 | Arizona | | Vejmelka | Mullett Arena | 4,600 | 23–26–4 | 50 | |
| 54 | February 18 | Arizona | 3–4 | Colorado | | Vejmelka | Ball Arena | 18,133 | 23–27–4 | 50 | |
| 55 | February 19 | Edmonton | 6–3 | Arizona | | Villalta | Mullett Arena | 4,600 | 23–28–4 | 50 | |
| 56 | February 21 | Toronto | 6–3 | Arizona | | Vejmelka | Mullett Arena | 4,600 | 23–29–4 | 50 | |
| 57 | February 25 | Arizona | 3–4 | Winnipeg | OT | Ingram | Canada Life Centre | 14,324 | 23–29–5 | 51 | |
| 58 | February 27 | Arizona | 2–4 | Montreal | | Ingram | Bell Centre | 21,105 | 23–30–5 | 51 | |
| 59 | February 29 | Arizona | 2–4 | Toronto | | Ingram | Scotiabank Arena | 18,662 | 23–31–5 | 51 | |

March: 8–7–0 (Home: 5–4–0; Road: 3–3–0)

| # | Date | Visitor | Score | Home | OT | Decision | Location | Attendance | Record | Points | Recap |
|---|---|---|---|---|---|---|---|---|---|---|---|
| 60 | March 1 | Arizona | 5–3 | Ottawa | | Vejmelka | Canadian Tire Centre | 17,734 | 24–31–5 | 53 | |
| 61 | March 3 | Arizona | 5–2 | Washington | | Vejmelka | Capital One Arena | 18,573 | 25–31–5 | 55 | |
| 62 | March 5 | Chicago | 5–2 | Arizona | | Ingram | Mullett Arena | 4,600 | 25–32–5 | 55 | |
| 63 | March 7 | Minnesota | 5–2 | Arizona | | Vejmelka | Mullett Arena | 4,600 | 25–33–5 | 55 | |
| 64 | March 8 | Detroit | 0–4 | Arizona | | Ingram | Mullett Arena | 4,600 | 26–33–5 | 57 | |
| 65 | March 10 | Arizona | 4–7 | Chicago | | Ingram | United Center | 18,666 | 26–34–5 | 57 | |
| 66 | March 12 | Arizona | 1–4 | Minnesota | | Vejmelka | Xcel Energy Center | 18,231 | 26–35–5 | 57 | |
| 67 | March 14 | Arizona | 4–1 | Detroit | | Ingram | Little Caesars Arena | 18,580 | 27–35–5 | 59 | |
| 68 | March 16 | New Jersey | 1–4 | Arizona | | Vejmelka | Mullett Arena | 4,600 | 28–35–5 | 61 | |
| 69 | March 20 | Arizona | 2–5 | Dallas | | Ingram | American Airlines Center | 18,532 | 28–36–5 | 61 | |
| 70 | March 22 | Seattle | 1–2 | Arizona | OT | Vejmelka | Mullett Arena | 4,600 | 29–36–5 | 63 | |
| 71 | March 24 | Dallas | 4–2 | Arizona | | Ingram | Mullett Arena | 4,600 | 29–37–5 | 63 | |
| 72 | March 26 | Columbus | 2–6 | Arizona | | Vejmelka | Mullett Arena | 4,600 | 30–37–5 | 65 | |
| 73 | March 28 | Nashville | 4–8 | Arizona | | Ingram | Mullett Arena | 4,600 | 31–37–5 | 67 | |
| 74 | March 30 | NY Rangers | 8–5 | Arizona | | Vejmelka | Mullett Arena | 4,600 | 31–38–5 | 67 | |

April: 5–3–0 (Home: 2–1–0; Road: 3–2–0)

| # | Date | Visitor | Score | Home | OT | Decision | Location | Attendance | Record | Points | Recap |
|---|---|---|---|---|---|---|---|---|---|---|---|
| 75 | April 3 | Vancouver | 2–1 | Arizona | | Ingram | Mullett Arena | 4,600 | 31–39–5 | 67 | |
| 76 | April 5 | Vegas | 4–7 | Arizona | | Vejmelka | Mullett Arena | 4,600 | 32–39–5 | 69 | |
| 77 | April 7 | Arizona | 5–2 | San Jose | | Ingram | SAP Center | 11,938 | 33–39–5 | 71 | |
| 78 | April 9 | Arizona | 0–5 | Seattle | | Vejmelka | Climate Pledge Arena | 17,151 | 33–40–5 | 71 | |
| 79 | April 10 | Arizona | 4–3 | Vancouver | OT | Ingram | Rogers Arena | 18,856 | 34–40–5 | 73 | |
| 80 | April 12 | Arizona | 3–2 | Edmonton | OT | Vejmelka | Rogers Place | 18,347 | 35–40–5 | 75 | |
| 81 | April 14 | Arizona | 5–6 | Calgary | | Ingram | Scotiabank Saddledome | 17,247 | 35–41–5 | 75 | |
| 82 | April 17 | Edmonton | 2–5 | Arizona | | Ingram | Mullett Arena | 4,600 | 36–41–5 | 77 | |

Win (2 points) Loss (0 points) Overtime/shootout loss (1 point)

== Player stats ==
Updated to game played April 17, 2024

=== Skaters ===
Regular season
| Player | GP | G | A | Pts | +/− | PIM |
|---|---|---|---|---|---|---|
| Clayton Keller | 78 | 33 | 43 | 76 | −20 | 32 |
| Nick Schmaltz | 79 | 22 | 39 | 61 | −16 | 10 |
| Matias Maccelli | 82 | 17 | 40 | 57 | −4 | 8 |
| Nick Bjugstad | 76 | 22 | 23 | 45 | +11 | 59 |
| Alexander Kerfoot | 82 | 13 | 32 | 45 | −15 | 26 |
| Logan Cooley | 82 | 20 | 24 | 44 | −13 | 18 |
| Lawson Crouse | 81 | 23 | 19 | 42 | −7 | 36 |
| Sean Durzi | 76 | 9 | 32 | 41 | −1 | 63 |
| Dylan Guenther | 45 | 18 | 17 | 35 | −1 | 14 |
| Michael Carcone | 74 | 21 | 8 | 29 | −2 | 35 |
| Jack McBain | 67 | 8 | 18 | 26 | +8 | 50 |
| J.J. Moser | 80 | 5 | 21 | 26 | −5 | 35 |
| Jason Zucker^{‡} | 51 | 9 | 16 | 25 | −5 | 58 |
| Michael Kesselring | 65 | 5 | 16 | 21 | +11 | 66 |
| Juuso Valimaki | 68 | 2 | 15 | 17 | +12 | 12 |
| Liam O'Brien | 75 | 5 | 9 | 14 | 0 | 153 |
| Matt Dumba^{‡} | 58 | 4 | 6 | 10 | −13 | 55 |
| Barrett Hayton | 33 | 3 | 7 | 10 | −13 | 26 |
| Josh Brown | 51 | 3 | 7 | 10 | +2 | 75 |
| Josh Doan | 11 | 5 | 4 | 9 | +6 | 0 |
| Travis Boyd | 16 | 2 | 6 | 8 | +3 | 2 |
| Travis Dermott | 50 | 2 | 5 | 7 | −14 | 26 |
| Troy Stecher^{‡} | 47 | 1 | 4 | 5 | +5 | 24 |
| Vladislav Kolyachonok | 5 | 1 | 3 | 4 | +5 | 2 |
| Zach Sanford^{‡} | 11 | 0 | 2 | 2 | +3 | 4 |
| John Leonard | 6 | 1 | 0 | 1 | −1 | 0 |
| Aku Raty | 1 | 0 | 1 | 1 | 0 | 0 |
| Jan Jenik | 5 | 0 | 1 | 1 | −1 | 5 |
| Milos Kelemen | 10 | 0 | 1 | 1 | −2 | 0 |
| Patrik Koch | 1 | 0 | 0 | 0 | 0 | 10 |
| Maksymilian Szuber | 1 | 0 | 0 | 0 | −1 | 2 |
| Victor Soderstrom | 3 | 0 | 0 | 0 | −1 | 0 |
| Cameron Crotty | 1 | 0 | 0 | 0 | −1 | 0 |
| Justin Kirkland | 2 | 0 | 0 | 0 | 0 | 0 |
| Adam Ruzicka^{†} | 3 | 0 | 0 | 0 | −1 | 6 |

=== Goaltenders ===
Regular season
| Player | GP | GS | TOI | W | L | OT | GA | GAA | SA | SV% | SO | G | A | PIM |
|---|---|---|---|---|---|---|---|---|---|---|---|---|---|---|
| Connor Ingram | 50 | 48 | 2,802:56 | 23 | 21 | 3 | 136 | 2.91 | 1,461 | .907 | 6 | 0 | 3 | 0 |
| Karel Vejmelka | 38 | 33 | 2,040:08 | 13 | 19 | 2 | 114 | 3.35 | 1,089 | .897 | 1 | 0 | 2 | 2 |
| Matt Villalta | 2 | 1 | 71:58 | 0 | 1 | 0 | 5 | 4.17 | 29 | .828 | 0 | 0 | 0 | 0 |

^{†}Denotes player spent time with another team before joining the Coyotes. Stats reflect time with the Coyotes only.
^{‡}Denotes player was traded mid-season. Stats reflect time with the Coyotes only.
Bold/italics denotes franchise record.

== Transactions ==
The Coyotes have been involved in the following transactions during the 2023–24 season.

=== Key ===
† Contract is entry-level.
‡ Contract initially takes effect in the 2024–25 season.

=== Trades ===
| Date | Details | | Ref |
|---|---|---|---|
| March 8, 2024 | To Nashville Predators Jason Zucker | To Arizona Coyotes 6th-round pick in 2024 | |
| March 8, 2024 | To Calgary Flames Troy Stecher 7th-round pick in 2024 | To Arizona Coyotes 4th-round pick in 2027 | |
| March 8, 2024 | To Tampa Bay Lightning Matt Dumba 7th-round pick in 2025 | To Arizona Coyotes 5th-round pick in 2027 | |

=== Players acquired ===
| Date | Player | Former team | Term | Via | Ref |
|---|---|---|---|---|---|
| July 1, 2023 | Nick Bjugstad | Edmonton Oilers | 2-year | Free agency | |
| July 1, 2023 | Alex Galchenyuk | Nashville Predators | 1-year | Free agency | |
| July 1, 2023 | Alexander Kerfoot | Toronto Maple Leafs | 2-year | Free agency | |
| July 1, 2023 | Troy Stecher | Calgary Flames | 1-year | Free agency | |
| July 1, 2023 | Matt Villalta | Los Angeles Kings | 1-year | Free agency | |
| July 1, 2023 | Jason Zucker | Pittsburgh Penguins | 1-year | Free agency | |
| July 2, 2023 | Travis Barron | Tucson Roadrunners (AHL) | 1-year | Free agency | |
| July 3, 2023 | John Leonard | Nashville Predators | 1-year | Free agency | |
| July 11, 2023 | Montana Onyebuchi | San Jose Barracuda (AHL) | 2-year† | Free agency | |
| July 12, 2023 | Travis Dermott | Vancouver Canucks | 1-year | Free agency | |
| July 14, 2023 | Zach Sanford | Nashville Predators | 1-year | Free agency | |
| July 15, 2023 | Justin Kirkland | Anaheim Ducks | 1-year | Free agency | |
| August 7, 2023 | Matt Dumba | Minnesota Wild | 1-year | Free agency | |
| January 25, 2024 | Adam Ruzicka | Calgary Flames | | Waivers | |

=== Players lost ===
| Date | Player | New team | Term | Via | Ref |
|---|---|---|---|---|---|
| July 1, 2023 | Bokondji Imama | Ottawa Senators | 1-year | Free agency | |
| July 1, 2023 | Emil Lilleberg | Tampa Bay Lightning | 2-year | Free agency | |
| July 1, 2023 | Connor Mackey | New York Rangers | 1-year | Free agency | |
| July 2, 2023 | Christian Fischer | Detroit Red Wings | 1-year | Free agency | |
| July 13, 2023 | Alex Galchenyuk | | | Contract termination | |
| July 28, 2023 | Patrik Nemeth | SC Bern (NL) | 2-year | Free agency | |
| August 6, 2023 | Jean-Sebastien Dea | | | Contract termination | |
| August 9, 2023 | Jean-Sebastien Dea | Metallurg Magnitogorsk (KHL) | 1-year | Free agency | |
| September 26, 2023 | David Tendeck | Wheeling Nailers (ECHL) | 1-year | Free agency | |
| October 9, 2023 | Ivan Prosvetov | Colorado Avalanche | | Waivers | |
| January 6, 2024 | Zach Sanford | Chicago Blackhawks | | Waivers | |
| February 25, 2024 | Adam Ruzicka | | | Contract termination | |

=== Signings ===
| Date | Player | Term | Ref |
|---|---|---|---|
| June 30, 2023 | Cameron Crotty | 1-year | |
| July 8, 2023 | Nathan Smith | 1-year | |
| July 16, 2023 | Ivan Prosvetov | 1-year | |
| July 17, 2023 | Matias Maccelli | 3-year | |
| July 27, 2023 | Logan Cooley | 3-year† | |
| July 30, 2023 | Jack McBain | 2-year | |
| September 20, 2023 | Jan Jenik | 1-year | |

== Draft picks ==
Below are the Arizona Coyotes selections at the 2023 NHL entry draft, which will be held on June 28 and 29, 2023, at Bridgestone Arena in Nashville, Tennessee.

| Round | # | Player | Pos | Nationality | College/Junior/Club team (League) |
|---|---|---|---|---|---|
| 1 | 6 | Dmitriy Simashev | D | Russia | Lokomotiv Yaroslavl (KHL) |
| 1 | 12 | Daniil But | LW | Russia | Lokomotiv Yaroslavl (KHL) |
| 2 | 38 | Michael Hrabal | G | Czechia | Omaha Lancers (USHL) |
| 3 | 70 | Jonathan Castagna | C | Canada | St. Andrew's Saints (CAHS) |
| 3 | 72 | Noel Nordh | LW | Sweden | Brynäs IF (J20 Nationell) |
| 3 | 81 | Tanner Ludtke | C | United States | Lincoln Stars (USHL) |
| 3 | 88 | Vadim Moroz | RW | Belarus | Dinamo Minsk (KHL) |
| 4 | 102 | Terrell Goldsmith | D | Canada | Prince Albert Raiders (WHL) |
| 5 | 134 | Melker Thelin | G | Sweden | Tegs SK (HockeyEttan) |
| 5 | 160 | Justin Kipkie | D | Canada | Victoria Royals (WHL) |
| 6 | 162 | Samu Bau | C | Finland | Ilves (Liiga) |
| 6 | 166 | Carsen Musser | G | United States | U.S. NTDP (USHL) |
