= Yakov Trenin =

Russian ice hockey player (born 1997)

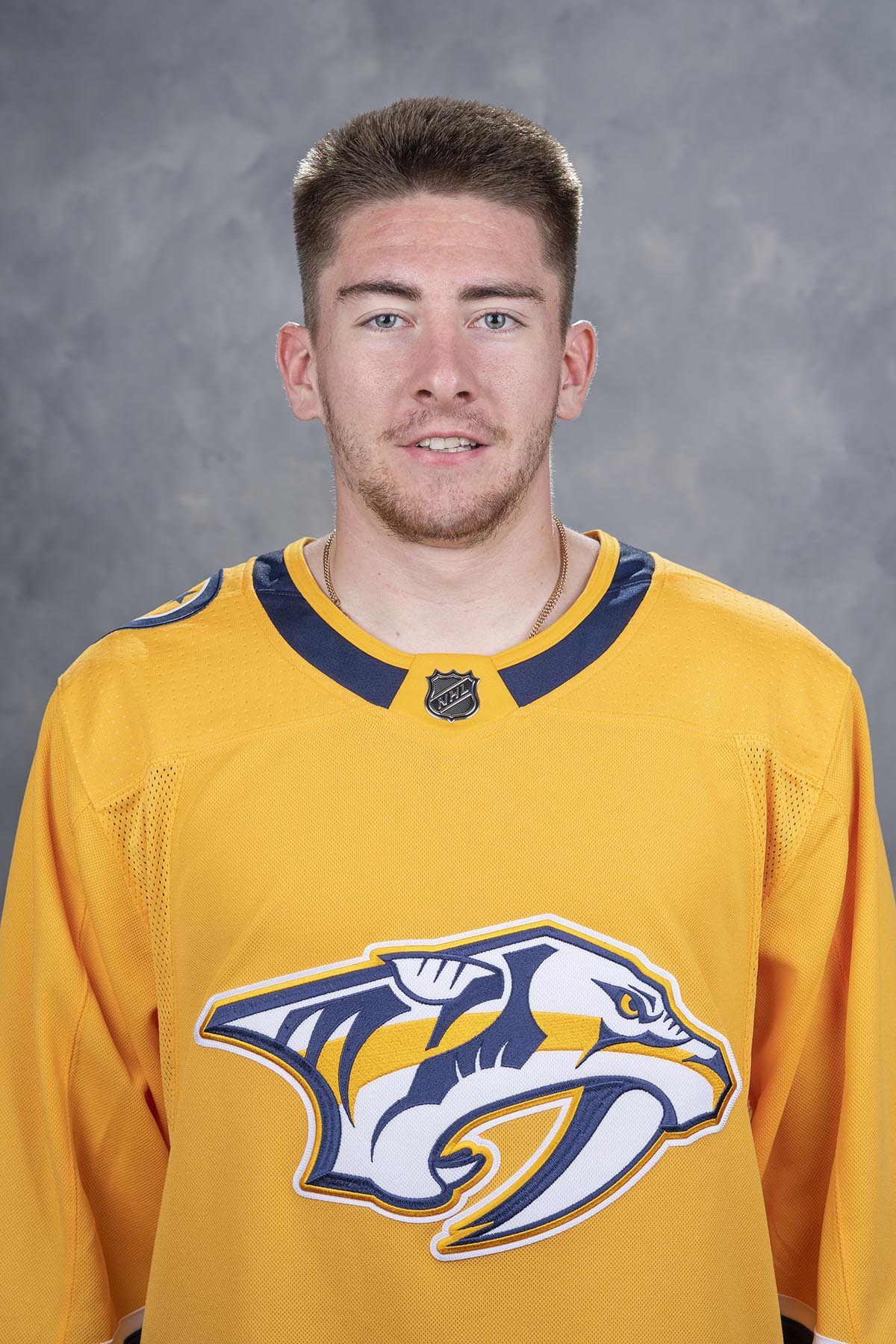
- Trenin with the Nashville Predators in 2019
- Born: 13 January 1997 (age 29) Chelyabinsk, Russia
- Height: 6 ft 2 in (188 cm)
- Weight: 201 lb (91 kg; 14 st 5 lb)
- Position: Forward
- Shoots: Right
- NHL team Former teams: Minnesota Wild; Nashville Predators; SKA Saint Petersburg; Colorado Avalanche
- NHL draft: 55th overall, 2015; Nashville Predators
- Playing career: 2016–present

Yakov Vyacheslavovich Trenin (Russian: Яков Вячеславович Тренин; born 13 January 1997) is a Russian professional ice hockey player who is a forward for the Minnesota Wild of the National Hockey League (NHL).

== Playing career ==
Trenin was drafted 55th overall by the Nashville Predators in the 2015 NHL entry draft and attended their development camp that summer. After the draft, Predators' North American amateur scout Jean-Philippe Glaude said: "He's a big center, who plays a solid two-way game...I see him as a complete, top-two center that can put points on the board and the coaches will love to have because he can play in any situation." In July 2015, Trenin signed a three-year, entry-level contract with the Predators. After signing the contract, Trenin was re-assigned to the Gatineau Olympiques of the Quebec Major Junior Hockey League (QMJHL) out of training camp.

Trenin recorded his first career NHL goal on 7 December 2019, in a 6–4 win over the New Jersey Devils, becoming the 184th player in franchise history to score a goal.

On 7 March 2024, Trenin was traded from Nashville to the Colorado Avalanche in exchange for Jeremy Hanzel and a third-round pick in the 2024 NHL entry draft. Trenin played out the remainder of the regular season by centering the Avalanche's fourth-line and contributing with 3 points through 16 games. He helped the Avalanche reach the second round of the playoffs, adding 1 goal through 10 appearances, before suffering elimination by the Dallas Stars.

As a free agent after his contract with the Avalanche, Trenin was signed to a four-year, $14 million contract in joining his third Central Division club, the Minnesota Wild, on 1 July 2024. During the 2025-26 NHL season, Trenin led the league in hits, setting a Wild franchise record of 413 in a single season.

== Career statistics ==
=== Regular season and playoffs ===
			Regular season					Playoffs
Season	Team	League	GP	G	A	Pts	PIM	GP	G	A	Pts	PIM
2013–14	Chelyabinsk Polar Bears	MHL	22	7	7	14	12	4	0	1	1	2
2014–15	Gatineau Olympiques	QMJHL	58	18	49	67	34	11	3	8	11	10
2015–16	Gatineau Olympiques	QMJHL	57	26	35	61	56	5	0	2	2	4
2015–16	Milwaukee Admirals	AHL	—	—	—	—	—	2	0	1	1	2
2016–17	Gatineau Olympiques	QMJHL	54	30	37	67	84	7	3	7	10	24
2016–17	Milwaukee Admirals	AHL	5	1	2	3	2	1	0	0	0	0
2017–18	Milwaukee Admirals	AHL	44	5	11	16	16	—	—	—	—	—
2018–19	Milwaukee Admirals	AHL	74	14	19	33	39	5	0	3	3	4
2019–20	Milwaukee Admirals	AHL	32	20	15	35	29	—	—	—	—	—
2019–20	Nashville Predators	NHL	21	2	4	6	9	—	—	—	—	—
2020–21	SKA Saint Petersburg	KHL	21	4	3	7	10	—	—	—	—	—
2020–21	Nashville Predators	NHL	45	5	6	11	22	6	2	0	2	0
2021–22	Nashville Predators	NHL	80	17	7	24	46	4	3	0	3	4
2022–23	Nashville Predators	NHL	77	12	12	24	47	—	—	—	—	—
2023–24	Nashville Predators	NHL	60	10	4	14	38	—	—	—	—	—
2023–24	Colorado Avalanche	NHL	16	2	1	3	2	10	1	0	1	4
2024–25	Minnesota Wild	NHL	76	7	8	15	54	6	0	2	2	0
2025–26	Minnesota Wild	NHL	82	6	17	23	38	9	0	2	2	6
NHL totals			457	61	59	120	256	35	6	4	10	14
KHL totals			21	4	3	7	10	—	—	—	—	—

Medal record

Representing Russia

Ice hockey

World Junior Championships
Bronze medal – third place	2017 Canada	

=== International ===
Year	Team	Event	Result	GP	G	A	Pts	PIM
2017	Russia	WJC	3rd place, bronze medalist(s)	7	2	2	4	4
Junior totals				7	2	2	4	4
