= 2023–24 Minnesota Wild season =

National Hockey League season

2023–24 Minnesota Wild
- Division: 6th Central
- Conference: 10th Western
- 2023–24 record: 39–34–9
- Home record: 20–16–5
- Road record: 19–18–4
- Goals for: 251
- Goals against: 263

Team information
- General manager: Bill Guerin
- Coach: Dean Evason (Oct. 11 – Nov. 27); John Hynes (Nov. 27 – Apr. 18)
- Captain: Jared Spurgeon
- Alternate captains: Marcus Foligno; Kirill Kaprizov
- Arena: Xcel Energy Center
- Average attendance: 18,643
- Minor league affiliates: Iowa Wild (AHL); Iowa Heartlanders (ECHL)

Team leaders
- Goals: Kirill Kaprizov (46)
- Assists: Mats Zuccarello (51)
- Points: Kirill Kaprizov (96)
- Penalty minutes: Jacob Middleton (77)
- Plus/minus: Jonas Brodin (+22)
- Wins: Filip Gustavsson (20)
- Goals against average: Marc-Andre Fleury (2.98)

The 2023–24 Minnesota Wild season was the 24th season of operation (23rd season of play) of the National Hockey League (NHL) franchise that was established on June 25, 1997. The Wild played two games in Stockholm at the Avicii Arena on November 18 and 19 as part of the NHL Global Series.

On April 9, 2024, the Wild were eliminated from playoff contention for the first time since the 2018–19 season (and only the second time since 2011–12) after a 5–2 loss to the Colorado Avalanche.

== Standings ==
=== Divisional standings ===
Central Division
Pos	Team	GP	W	L	OTL	RW	GF	GA	GD	Pts
1	z – Dallas Stars	82	52	21	9	40	298	234	+64	113
2	x – Winnipeg Jets	82	52	24	6	46	259	199	+60	110
3	x – Colorado Avalanche	82	50	25	7	42	304	254	+50	107
4	x – Nashville Predators	82	47	30	5	38	269	248	+21	99
5	St. Louis Blues	82	43	33	6	31	239	250	−11	92
6	Minnesota Wild	82	39	34	9	32	251	263	−12	87
7	Arizona Coyotes	82	36	41	5	28	256	274	−18	77
8	Chicago Blackhawks	82	23	53	6	17	179	290	−111	52

Source: National Hockey League
Rules for classification: 1) Fewer number of games played (GP, only during regular season); 2) Greater number of regulation wins (RW); 3) Greater number of wins in regulation and overtime, excluding shootout wins (ROW); 4) Greater number of total wins, including shootouts (W); 5) Greater number of points earned in head-to-head play; if teams played an uneven number of head-to-head games, the result of the first game on the home ice of the team with the extra home game is discarded; 6) Greater goal differential (GD); 7) Greater number of goals scored (GF)
x – Clinched playoff spot; z – Clinched conference

=== Conference standings ===
Western Conference Wild Card
Pos	Div	Team	GP	W	L	OTL	RW	GF	GA	GD	Pts
1	CE	x – Nashville Predators	82	47	30	5	38	269	248	+21	99
2	PA	x – Vegas Golden Knights	82	45	29	8	34	267	245	+22	98
3	CE	St. Louis Blues	82	43	33	6	31	239	250	−11	92
4	CE	Minnesota Wild	82	39	34	9	32	251	263	−12	87
5	PA	Calgary Flames	82	38	39	5	32	253	271	−18	81
6	PA	Seattle Kraken	82	34	35	13	28	217	236	−19	81
7	CE	Arizona Coyotes	82	36	41	5	28	256	274	−18	77
8	PA	Anaheim Ducks	82	27	50	5	21	204	295	−91	59
9	CE	Chicago Blackhawks	82	23	53	6	17	179	290	−111	52
10	PA	San Jose Sharks	82	19	54	9	14	181	331	−150	47

Source: National Hockey League
Rules for classification: 1) Fewer number of games played (GP, only during regular season); 2) Greater number of regulation wins (RW); 3) Greater number of wins in regulation and overtime, excluding shootout wins (ROW); 4) Greater number of total wins, including shootouts (W); 5) Greater number of points earned in head-to-head play; if teams played an uneven number of head-to-head games, the result of the first game on the home ice of the team with the extra home game is discarded; 6) Greater goal differential (GD); 7) Greater number of goals scored (GF)
x – Clinched playoff spot

== Schedule and results ==
=== Preseason ===
The Minnesota Wild preseason schedule was released on June 23, 2023.

2023 preseason game log: 5–1–0 (Home: 3–0–0; Road: 2–1–0)

#	Date	Visitor	Score	Home	Location	Attendance	Record
1	September 24	Minnesota	4–3	Colorado	Ball Arena	14,501	1–0–0
2	September 26	Minnesota	1–6	Dallas	American Airlines Center	14,114	1–1–0
3	September 28	Colorado	3–4	Minnesota	Xcel Energy Center	16,215	2–1–0
4	September 30	Chicago	2–3 OT	Minnesota	Xcel Energy Center	18,199	3–1–0
5	October 5	Minnesota	3–2 SO	Chicago	United Center	12,766	4–1–0
6	October 7	Dallas	0–4	Minnesota	Xcel Energy Center	18,205	5–1–0

Legend: = Win = Loss = OT/SO Loss

=== Regular season ===
The regular season schedule was released on June 27, 2023.

2023–24 game log

October: 3–4–2 (Home: 2–1–1; Road: 1–3–1)
#	Date	Visitor	Score	Home	OT	Decision	Attendance	Record	Pts	Recap
1	October 12	Florida	0–2	Minnesota		Gustavsson	18,976	1–0–0	2
2	October 14	Minnesota	4–7	Toronto		Gustavsson	18,903	1–1–0	2
3	October 17	Minnesota	5–2	Montreal		Fleury	21,105	2–1–0	4
4	October 19	Los Angeles	7–3	Minnesota		Fleury	18,689	2–2–0	4
5	October 21	Columbus	5–4	Minnesota	OT	Gustavsson	18,479	2–2–1	5
6	October 24	Edmonton	4–7	Minnesota		Gustavsson	17,064	3–2–1	7
7	October 26	Minnesota	2–6	Philadelphia		Gustavsson	17,144	3–3–1	7
8	October 27	Minnesota	2–3	Washington	SO	Fleury	16,602	3–3–2	8
9	October 29	Minnesota	3–4	New Jersey		Fleury	16,514	3–4–2	8

November: 4–6–2 (Home: 2–3–1; Road: 2–3–1)
#	Date	Visitor	Score	Home	OT	Decision	Attendance	Record	Pts	Recap
10	November 2	New Jersey	5–3	Minnesota		Gustavsson	18,399	3–5–2	8
11	November 4	NY Rangers	4–5	Minnesota	SO	Fleury	18,678	4–5–2	10
12	November 7	Minnesota	4–2	NY Islanders		Fleury	13,527	5–5–2	12
13	November 9	Minnesota	1–4	NY Rangers		Fleury	18,006	5–6–2	12
14	November 10	Minnesota	2–3	Buffalo		Gustavsson	17,031	5–7–2	12
15	November 12	Dallas	8–3	Minnesota		Fleury	18,509	5–8–2	12
16	November 18^{[a]}	Minnesota	1–2	Ottawa	SO	Gustavsson	13,213	5–8–3	13
17	November 19^{[a]}	Toronto	4–3	Minnesota	OT	Fleury	13,356	5–8–4	14
18	November 24	Colorado	3–2	Minnesota		Gustavsson	19,057	5–9–4	14
19	November 26	Minnesota	1–4	Detroit		Gustavsson	18,833	5–10–4	14
20	November 28	St. Louis	1–3	Minnesota		Gustavsson	17,563	6–10–4	16
21	November 30	Minnesota	6–1	Nashville		Gustavsson	17,159	7–10–4	18

December: 9–5–0 (Home: 6–1–0; Road: 3–4–0)
#	Date	Visitor	Score	Home	OT	Decision	Attendance	Record	Pts	Recap
22	December 3	Chicago	1–4	Minnesota		Fleury	19,301	8–10–4	20
23	December 5	Minnesota	5–2	Calgary		Gustavsson	16,661	9–10–4	22
24	December 7	Minnesota	0–2	Vancouver		Gustavsson	18,667	9–11–4	22
25	December 8	Minnesota	3–4	Edmonton		Fleury	18,173	9–12–4	22
26	December 10	Minnesota	3–0	Seattle		Gustavsson	17,151	10–12–4	24
27	December 14	Calgary	2–3	Minnesota	SO	Gustavsson	18,167	11–12–4	26
28	December 16	Vancouver	1–2	Minnesota	SO	Gustavsson	18,519	12–12–4	28
29	December 18	Minnesota	3–4	Pittsburgh		Gustavsson	18,200	12–13–4	28
30	December 19	Minnesota	4–3	Boston	OT	Fleury	17,850	13–13–4	30
31	December 21	Montreal	3–4	Minnesota	OT	Gustavsson	18,387	14–13–4	32
32	December 23	Boston	2–3	Minnesota		Fleury	19,183	15–13–4	34
33	December 27	Detroit	3–6	Minnesota		Gustavsson	19,105	16–13–4	36
34	December 30	Minnesota	2–4	Winnipeg		Gustavsson	15,225	16–14–4	36
35	December 31	Winnipeg	3–2	Minnesota		Fleury	19,129	16–15–4	36

January: 5–8–1 (Home: 2–6–1; Road: 3–2–0)
#	Date	Visitor	Score	Home	OT	Decision	Attendance	Record	Pts	Recap
36	January 2	Calgary	3–1	Minnesota		Fleury	18,456	16–16–4	36
37	January 4	Tampa Bay	4–1	Minnesota		Fleury	18,689	16–17–4	36
38	January 6	Minnesota	4–3	Columbus	OT	Fleury	18,771	17–17–4	38
39	January 8	Dallas	4–0	Minnesota		Fleury	18,087	17–18–4	38
40	January 10	Minnesota	2–7	Dallas		Wallstedt	18,532	17–19–4	38
41	January 12	Philadelphia	4–3	Minnesota	OT	Fleury	18,473	17–19–5	39
42	January 13	Arizona	6–0	Minnesota		Gustavsson	18,812	17–20–5	39
43	January 15	NY Islanders	0–5	Minnesota		Fleury	18,231	18–20–5	41
44	January 18	Minnesota	3–7	Tampa Bay		Gustavsson	19,092	18–21–5	41
45	January 19	Minnesota	6–4	Florida		Gustavsson	19,595	19–21–5	43
46	January 21	Minnesota	5–2	Carolina		Gustavsson	18,749	20–21–5	45
47	January 23	Washington	3–5	Minnesota		Gustavsson	18,437	21–21–5	47
48	January 25	Nashville	3–2	Minnesota		Gustavsson	18,254	21–22–5	47
49	January 27	Anaheim	3–2	Minnesota		Gustavsson	19,053	21–23–5	47

February: 7–3–1 (Home: 2–1–1; Road: 5–2–0)
#	Date	Visitor	Score	Home	OT	Decision	Attendance	Record	Pts	Recap
50	February 7	Minnesota	2–1	Chicago		Gustavsson	17,230	22–23–5	49
51	February 9	Pittsburgh	2–3	Minnesota		Fleury	19,329	23–23–5	51
52	February 12	Minnesota	5–3	Vegas		Gustavsson	18,207	24–23–5	53
53	February 14	Minnesota	3–1	Arizona		Fleury	4,600	25–23–5	55
54	February 17	Buffalo	3–2	Minnesota	OT	Gustavsson	19,276	25–23–6	56
55	February 19	Vancouver	7–10	Minnesota		Fleury	19,024	26–23–6	58
56	February 20	Minnesota	3–6	Winnipeg		Fleury	14,707	26–24–6	58
57	February 23	Minnesota	4–2	Edmonton		Gustavsson	18,347	27–24–6	60
58	February 24	Minnesota	5–2	Seattle		Fleury	17,151	28–24–6	62
59	February 27	Carolina	3–2	Minnesota		Gustavsson	18,775	28–25–6	62
60	February 29	Minnesota	1–6	Nashville		Gustavsson	17,159	28–26–6	62

March: 7–3–3 (Home: 5–1–1; Road: 2–2–2)
#	Date	Visitor	Score	Home	OT	Decision	Attendance	Record	Pts	Recap
61	March 2	Minnesota	1–3	St. Louis		Fleury	18,096	28–27–6	62
62	March 3	San Jose	3–4	Minnesota		Gustavsson	18,879	29–27–6	64
63	March 7	Minnesota	5–2	Arizona		Fleury	4,600	30–27–6	66
64	March 8	Minnesota	1–2	Colorado	OT	Gustavsson	18,134	30–27–7	67
65	March 10	Nashville	3–4	Minnesota	OT	Fleury	18,800	31–27–7	69
66	March 12	Arizona	1–4	Minnesota		Fleury	18,231	32–27–7	71
67	March 14	Anaheim	0–2	Minnesota		Fleury	18,376	33–27–7	73
68	March 16	Minnesota	2–3	St. Louis	SO	Fleury	18,096	33–27–8	74
69	March 19	Minnesota	4–0	Anaheim		Gustavsson	16,239	34–27–8	76
70	March 20	Minnesota	0–6	Los Angeles		Gustavsson	17,086	34–28–8	76
71	March 23	St. Louis	5–4	Minnesota	OT	Fleury	19,090	34–28–9	77
72	March 28	San Jose	1–3	Minnesota		Gustavsson	18,589	35–28–9	79
73	March 30	Vegas	2–1	Minnesota	OT (Note: Rule 84.2 of the NHL rulebook states "A team shall be allowed to pull its goalkeeper in favor of an additional skater in the overtime period. However, should that team lose the game during the time in which the goalkeeper has been removed, it would forfeit the automatic point gained in the tie at the end of regulation play, except if the goalkeeper has been removed at the call of a delayed penalty against the other team." As the Wild pulled Gustavsson in overtime and subsequently lost the game on an empty-net goal, they were charged with a regulation loss and forfeited the 1 point normally gained in an overtime loss.)	Gustavsson	19,178	35–29–9	79

April: 4–5–0 (Home: 1–3–0; Road: 3–2–0)
#	Date	Visitor	Score	Home	OT	Decision	Attendance	Record	Pts	Recap
74	April 2	Ottawa	2–3	Minnesota		Fleury	18,056	36–29–9	81
75	April 4	Colorado	5–2	Minnesota		Gustavsson	18,803	36–30–9	81
76	April 6	Winnipeg	4–2	Minnesota		Fleury	18,989	36–31–9	81
77	April 7	Minnesota	4–0	Chicago		Wallstedt	19,636	37–31–9	83
78	April 9	Minnesota	2–5	Colorado		Gustavsson	18,097	37–32–9	83
79	April 12	Minnesota	2–7	Vegas		Fleury	18,415	37–33–9	83
80	April 13	Minnesota	6–2	San Jose		Wallstedt	17,435	38–33–9	85
81	April 15	Minnesota	3–1	Los Angeles		Gustavsson	17,654	39–33–9	87
82	April 18	Seattle	4–3	Minnesota		Fleury	19,138	39–34–9	87

Legend: Win (2 points) Loss (0 points) Overtime/shootout loss (1 point)
Notes:
^{a} Game was played at Avicii Arena in Stockholm, Sweden.

== Player statistics ==
As of April 18, 2024

=== Skaters ===
Regular season
Player	GP	G	A	Pts	+/−	PIM
Kirill Kaprizov	75	46	50	96	+11	36
Matt Boldy	75	29	40	69	+5	48
Joel Eriksson Ek	77	30	34	64	+18	60
Mats Zuccarello	69	12	51	63	–5	30
Brock Faber	82	8	39	47	–1	26
Ryan Hartman	74	21	24	45	+4	72
Marco Rossi	82	21	19	40	–4	47
Marcus Johansson	78	11	19	30	–15	22
Jonas Brodin	62	7	20	27	+22	16
Jacob Middleton	80	7	18	25	–15	77
Marcus Foligno	55	10	12	22	+10	59
Patrick Maroon^{‡}	49	4	12	16	–11	60
Frederick Gaudreau	67	5	10	15	–23	12
Connor Dewar^{‡}	57	10	4	14	–6	20
Zach Bogosian^{†}	61	3	11	14	+11	63
Jon Merrill	65	4	7	11	0	30
Alex Goligoski	36	0	10	10	–8	18
Vinni Lettieri	46	5	4	9	–7	24
Brandon Duhaime^{‡}	62	4	4	8	–7	66
Declan Chisholm^{†}	29	3	5	8	−8	18
Dakota Mermis	47	3	5	8	−2	33
Jake Lucchini	40	2	3	5	–3	23
Calen Addison^{‡}	12	0	5	5	−3	6
Jared Spurgeon	16	0	5	5	+5	2
Marat Khusnutdinov	16	1	3	4	−3	6
Mason Shaw	20	1	2	3	0	34
Liam Ohgren	4	1	1	2	0	0
Adam Beckman	11	0	2	2	–2	12
Nic Petan^{‡}	6	0	2	2	–2	2
Daemon Hunt	12	0	1	1	–1	0
Adam Raska	5	0	0	0	0	0
Sammy Walker	4	0	0	0	–3	0
Jujhar Khaira	1	0	0	0	0	0

=== Goaltenders ===
Regular season
Player	GP	GS	TOI	W	L	OT	GA	GAA	SA	SV%	SO	G	A	PIM
Filip Gustavsson	45	43	2,526:33	20	18	4	129	3.06	1,283	.899	3	0	1	0
Marc-Andre Fleury	40	36	2,232:40	17	15	5	111	2.98	1,056	.895	2	0	1	4
Jesper Wallstedt	3	3	179:17	2	1	0	9	3.01	87	.897	1	0	0	0

^{†}Denotes player spent time with another team before joining the Wild. Stats reflect time with the Wild only.
^{‡}Denotes player was traded mid-season. Stats reflect time with the Wild only.
Bold/italics denotes franchise record.

== Transactions ==
The Wild have been involved in the following transactions during the 2023–24 season.

Key:

† Contract is entry-level.
‡ Contract initially takes effect in the 2023–24 season.

=== Trades ===
Date	Details		Ref
July 2, 2023	To Tampa Bay Lightning 7th-round pick in 2024	To Minnesota Wild Maxim Cajkovic; Patrick Maroon (20% retained)	
November 8, 2023	To San Jose Sharks Calen Addison	To Minnesota Wild Adam Raska; 5th-round pick in 2026	
November 8, 2023	To Tampa Bay Lightning 7th-round pick in 2025	To Minnesota Wild Zach Bogosian	
January 25, 2024	To Pittsburgh Penguins Maxim Cajkovic	To Minnesota Wild Will Butcher	
March 7, 2024	To Colorado Avalanche Brandon Duhaime	To Minnesota Wild 3rd-round pick in 2026	
March 8, 2024	To Boston Bruins Patrick Maroon	To Minnesota Wild Luke Toporowski; Conditional 6th-round pick in 2026	
March 8, 2024	To New York Rangers Nic Petan	To Minnesota Wild Turner Elson	
March 8, 2024	To Toronto Maple Leafs Connor Dewar	To Minnesota Wild Dmitri Ovchinnikov; 4th-round pick in 2026	
June 21, 2024	To New Jersey Devils Adam Beckman	To Minnesota Wild Graeme Clarke	

=== Players acquired ===
Date	Player	Former team	Term	Via	Ref
July 1, 2023	Vinni Lettieri	Boston Bruins	2-year	Free agency	
July 1, 2023	Jake Lucchini	Ottawa Senators	1-year	Free agency	
September 17, 2023	Jujhar Khaira	Chicago Blackhawks	1-year	Free agency	
January 29, 2024	Declan Chisholm	Winnipeg Jets		Waivers	

=== Players lost ===
Date	Player	New team	Term	Via	Ref
July 1, 2023	Mitchell Chaffee	Tampa Bay Lightning	1-year	Free agency	
July 1, 2023	John Klingberg	Toronto Maple Leafs	1-year	Free agency	
July 1, 2023	Gustav Nyquist	Nashville Predators	2-year	Free agency	
July 1, 2023	Ryan Reaves	Toronto Maple Leafs	3-year	Free agency	
July 1, 2023	Sam Steel	Dallas Stars	1-year	Free agency	
July 2, 2023	Joe Hicketts	Los Angeles Kings	1-year	Free agency	
July 11, 2023	Damien Giroux	Rochester Americans (AHL)	1-year	Free agency	
July 12, 2023	Oskar Sundqvist	St. Louis Blues	1-year	Free agency	
August 7, 2023	Matt Dumba	Arizona Coyotes	1-year	Free agency	

=== Signings ===
Date	Player	Term	Ref
June 30, 2023	Zane McIntyre	1-year	
June 30, 2023	Dakota Mermis	1-year	
June 30, 2023	Nick Swaney	1-year	
July 16, 2023	Brandon Duhaime	1-year	
July 16, 2023	Filip Gustavsson	3-year	
September 29, 2023	Marcus Foligno	4-year‡	
September 29, 2023	Mats Zuccarello	2-year‡	
October 7, 2023	Ryan Hartman	3-year‡	
March 6, 2024	Zach Bogosian	2-year	
March 18, 2024	Rasmus Kumpulainen	3-year†	

== Draft picks ==
Below are the Minnesota Wild selections at the 2023 NHL entry draft, which was held on June 28 and 29, 2023, at Bridgestone Arena in Nashville, Tennessee.

Round	#	Player	Pos	Nationality	College/Junior/Club team (League)
1	21	Charlie Stramel	C	United States	Wisconsin Badgers (B1G)
2	53	Rasmus Kumpulainen	C	Finland	Lahti Pelicans (U20 SM-sarja)
2	64	Riley Heidt	C	Canada	Prince George Cougars (WHL)
5	149	Aaron Pionk	D	United States	Waterloo Black Hawks (USHL)
6	181	Kalem Parker	D	Canada	Victoria Royals (WHL)
7	213	James Clark	LW	United States	Green Bay Gamblers (USHL)
