= 2023–24 Winnipeg Jets season =

National Hockey League season

2023–24 Winnipeg Jets
- Division: 2nd Central
- Conference: 2nd Western
- 2023–24 record: 52–24–6
- Home record: 27–11–3
- Road record: 25–13–3
- Goals for: 259
- Goals against: 199

Team information
- General manager: Kevin Cheveldayoff
- Coach: Rick Bowness (Oct. 11 – Oct. 23, Nov. 24 – Apr. 30); Scott Arniel (interim, Oct. 23 – Nov. 24)
- Captain: Adam Lowry
- Alternate captains: Josh Morrissey; Mark Scheifele
- Arena: Canada Life Centre
- Average attendance: 13,447
- Minor league affiliates: Manitoba Moose (AHL); Norfolk Admirals (ECHL)

Team leaders
- Goals: Kyle Connor (34)
- Assists: Josh Morrissey (59)
- Points: Mark Scheifele (72)
- Penalty minutes: Brenden Dillon (92)
- Plus/minus: Dylan DeMelo (+46)
- Wins: Connor Hellebuyck (37)
- Goals against average: Laurent Brossoit (2.00)

The 2023–24 Winnipeg Jets season was the 41st season of play for the National Hockey League (NHL) franchise that was established on June 22, 1979, 49th season for the organization overall, and the 13th in Winnipeg, since the franchise relocated from Atlanta prior to the start of the 2011–12 NHL season.

During the regular season the Jets were on an eight-game win streak, setting a franchise record for most consecutive wins.

On April 4, 2024, the Jets clinched their second consecutive playoff berth, and their sixth in the past seven seasons, following a 5–2 win over the Calgary Flames. They faced the Colorado Avalanche in the first round, and repeated their same fate from the previous season, losing in five games after going up 1-0.

== Standings ==
=== Divisional standings ===
Central Division
Pos	Team	GP	W	L	OTL	RW	GF	GA	GD	Pts
1	z – Dallas Stars	82	52	21	9	40	298	234	+64	113
2	x – Winnipeg Jets	82	52	24	6	46	259	199	+60	110
3	x – Colorado Avalanche	82	50	25	7	42	304	254	+50	107
4	x – Nashville Predators	82	47	30	5	38	269	248	+21	99
5	St. Louis Blues	82	43	33	6	31	239	250	−11	92
6	Minnesota Wild	82	39	34	9	32	251	263	−12	87
7	Arizona Coyotes	82	36	41	5	28	256	274	−18	77
8	Chicago Blackhawks	82	23	53	6	17	179	290	−111	52

Source: National Hockey League
Rules for classification: 1) Fewer number of games played (GP, only during regular season); 2) Greater number of regulation wins (RW); 3) Greater number of wins in regulation and overtime, excluding shootout wins (ROW); 4) Greater number of total wins, including shootouts (W); 5) Greater number of points earned in head-to-head play; if teams played an uneven number of head-to-head games, the result of the first game on the home ice of the team with the extra home game is discarded; 6) Greater goal differential (GD); 7) Greater number of goals scored (GF)
x – Clinched playoff spot; z – Clinched conference

=== Conference standings ===
Western Conference Wild Card
Pos	Div	Team	GP	W	L	OTL	RW	GF	GA	GD	Pts
1	CE	x – Nashville Predators	82	47	30	5	38	269	248	+21	99
2	PA	x – Vegas Golden Knights	82	45	29	8	34	267	245	+22	98
3	CE	St. Louis Blues	82	43	33	6	31	239	250	−11	92
4	CE	Minnesota Wild	82	39	34	9	32	251	263	−12	87
5	PA	Calgary Flames	82	38	39	5	32	253	271	−18	81
6	PA	Seattle Kraken	82	34	35	13	28	217	236	−19	81
7	CE	Arizona Coyotes	82	36	41	5	28	256	274	−18	77
8	PA	Anaheim Ducks	82	27	50	5	21	204	295	−91	59
9	CE	Chicago Blackhawks	82	23	53	6	17	179	290	−111	52
10	PA	San Jose Sharks	82	19	54	9	14	181	331	−150	47

Source: National Hockey League
Rules for classification: 1) Fewer number of games played (GP, only during regular season); 2) Greater number of regulation wins (RW); 3) Greater number of wins in regulation and overtime, excluding shootout wins (ROW); 4) Greater number of total wins, including shootouts (W); 5) Greater number of points earned in head-to-head play; if teams played an uneven number of head-to-head games, the result of the first game on the home ice of the team with the extra home game is discarded; 6) Greater goal differential (GD); 7) Greater number of goals scored (GF)
x – Clinched playoff spot

== Schedule and results ==
=== Preseason ===
The Winnipeg Jets 2023 Preseason was released on June 23, 2023.

2023 preseason: 2–3–1 (home: 1–1–1; road: 1–2–0)

Game	Date	Visitor	Score	Home	OT	Decision	Location	Attendance	Record	Recap
1	September 24	Winnipeg	2–1	Edmonton	SO	Delia	Rogers Place	17,419	1–0–0	
2	September 25	Edmonton	0–5	Winnipeg		Brossoit	Canada Life Centre	11,629	2–0–0	
3	September 27	Calgary	3–2	Winnipeg	SO	Salminen	Canada Life Centre	11,673	2–0–1	
4	September 29	Winnipeg	1–3	Ottawa		Brossoit	Canadian Tire Centre	12,276	2–1–1	
5	October 2	Winnipeg	4–5	Calgary		Hellebuyck	Scotiabank Saddledome	16,697	2–2–1	
6	October 5	Ottawa	3–0	Winnipeg		Hellebuyck	Canada Life Centre	13,601	2–3–1	

=== Regular season ===
The regular season schedule was released on June 27, 2023.

2023–24 game log
October: 4–3–2 (home: 2–2–1; road: 2–1–1)

Game	Date	Visitor	Score	Home	OT	Decision	Location	Attendance	Record	Points	Recap
1	October 11	Winnipeg	3–5	Calgary		Hellebuyck	Scotiabank Saddledome	17,414	0–1–0	0	
2	October 14	Florida	4–6	Winnipeg		Hellebuyck	Canada Life Centre	13,410	1–1–0	2	
3	October 17	Los Angeles	5–1	Winnipeg		Hellebuyck	Canada Life Centre	11,226	1–2–0	2	
4	October 19	Vegas	5–3	Winnipeg		Brossoit	Canada Life Centre	11,521	1–3–0	2	
5	October 21	Winnipeg	3–2	Edmonton	OT	Hellebuyck	Rogers Place	18,347	2–3–0	4	
6	October 24	St. Louis	2–4	Winnipeg		Hellebuyck	Canada Life Centre	11,136	3–3–0	6	
7	October 26	Winnipeg	4–1	Detroit		Hellebuyck	Little Caesars Arena	17,857	4–3–0	8	
8	October 28	Winnipeg	3–4	Montreal	SO	Brossoit	Bell Centre	21,105	4–3–1	9	
9	October 30	NY Rangers	3–2	Winnipeg	OT	Hellebuyck	Canada Life Centre	11,898	4–3–2	10	

November: 8–5–0 (home: 4–3–0; road: 4–2–0)

Game	Date	Visitor	Score	OT	Home	Decision	Location	Attendance	Record	Points	Recap
10	November 2	Winnipeg	2–5		Vegas	Hellebuyck	T-Mobile Arena	17,878	4–4–2	10	
11	November 4	Winnipeg	5–3		Arizona	Hellebuyck	Mullett Arena	4,600	5–4–2	12	
12	November 7	Winnipeg	5–2		St. Louis	Hellebuyck	Enterprise Center	18,096	6–4–2	14	
13	November 9	Nashville	3–6		Winnipeg	Brossoit	Canada Life Centre	12,199	7–4–2	16	
14	November 11	Dallas	3–2		Winnipeg	Hellebuyck	Canada Life Centre	12,420	7–5–2	16	
15	November 14	New Jersey	3–6		Winnipeg	Hellebuyck	Canada Life Centre	11,717	8–5–2	18	
16	November 17	Buffalo	2–3		Winnipeg	Hellebuyck	Canada Life Centre	11,340	9–5–2	20	
17	November 18	Arizona	2–5		Winnipeg	Brossoit	Canada Life Centre	12,103	10–5–2	22	
18	November 22	Winnipeg	3–2	OT	Tampa Bay	Hellebuyck	Amalie Arena	19,092	11–5–2	24	
19	November 24	Winnipeg	3–0		Florida	Hellebuyck	Amerant Bank Arena	18,801	12–5–2	26	
20	November 26	Winnipeg	2–3		Nashville	Brossoit	Bridgestone Arena	17,159	12–6–2	26	
21	November 28	Dallas	2–0		Winnipeg	Hellebuyck	Canada Life Centre	11,439	12–7–2	26	
22	November 30	Edmonton	3–1		Winnipeg	Hellebuyck	Canada Life Centre	13,611	12–8–2	26	

December: 10–1–2 (home: 6–0–1; road: 4–1–1)

Game	Date	Visitor	Score	OT	Home	Decision	Location	Attendance	Record	Points	Recap
23	December 2	Chicago	1–3		Winnipeg	Hellebuyck	Canada Life Centre	14,189	13–8–2	28	
24	December 4	Carolina	1–2		Winnipeg	Brossoit	Canada Life Centre	11,468	14–8–2	30	
25	December 7	Winnipeg	4–2		Colorado	Hellebuyck	Ball Arena	18,008	15–8–2	32	
26	December 10	Winnipeg	4–2		Anaheim	Hellebuyck	Honda Center	13,626	16–8–2	34	
27	December 12	Winnipeg	1–2		San Jose	Brossoit	SAP Center	13,142	16–9–2	34	
28	December 13	Winnipeg	5–2		Los Angeles	Hellebuyck	Crypto.com Arena	18,145	17–9–2	36	
29	December 16	Colorado	2–6		Winnipeg	Hellebuyck	Canada Life Centre	13,515	18–9–2	38	
30	December 18	Montreal	3–2	OT	Winnipeg	Hellebuyck	Canada Life Centre	13,363	18–9–3	39	
31	December 20	Detroit	2–5		Winnipeg	Brossoit	Canada Life Centre	12,571	19–9–3	41	
32	December 22	Boston	1–5		Winnipeg	Hellebuyck	Canada Life Centre	14,405	20–9–3	43	
33	December 27	Winnipeg	1–2	OT	Chicago	Hellebuyck	United Center	20,540	20–9–4	44	
34	December 30	Minnesota	2–4		Winnipeg	Hellebuyck	Canada Life Centre	15,225	21–9–4	46	
35	December 31	Winnipeg	3–2		Minnesota	Brossoit	Xcel Energy Center	19,129	22–9–4	48	

January: 8–3–1 (home: 4–2–0; road: 4–1–1)

Game	Date	Visitor	Score	OT	Home	Decision	Location	Attendance	Record	Points	Recap
36	January 2	Tampa Bay	2–4		Winnipeg	Hellebuyck	Canada Life Centre	14,157	23–9–4	50	
37	January 4	Winnipeg	2–1		San Jose	Hellebuyck	SAP Center	10,521	24–9–4	52	
38	January 5	Winnipeg	3–1		Anaheim	Brossoit	Honda Center	13,883	25–9–4	54	
39	January 7	Winnipeg	6–2		Arizona	Hellebuyck	Mullett Arena	4,600	26–9–4	56	
40	January 9	Columbus	0–5		Winnipeg	Hellebuyck	Canada Life Centre	12,512	27–9–4	58	
41	January 11	Chicago	1–2		Winnipeg	Brossoit	Canada Life Centre	15,225	28–9–4	60	
42	January 13	Philadelphia	2–0		Winnipeg	Hellebuyck	Canada Life Centre	14,540	28–10–4	60	
43	January 16	NY Islanders	2–4		Winnipeg	Hellebuyck	Canada Life Centre	12,600	29–10–4	62	
44	January 20	Winnipeg	2–1	OT	Ottawa	Hellebuyck	Canadian Tire Centre	19,388	30–10–4	64	
45	January 22	Winnipeg	1–4		Boston	Hellebuyck	TD Garden	17,850	30–11–4	64	
46	January 24	Winnipeg	0–1	OT	Toronto	Brossoit	Scotiabank Arena	18,972	30–11–5	65	
47	January 27	Toronto	4–2		Winnipeg	Hellebuyck	Canada Life Centre	15,225	30–12–5	65	

February: 7–4–0 (home: 5–0–0; road: 2–4–0)

Game	Date	Visitor	Score	OT	Home	Decision	Location	Attendance	Record	Points	Recap
48	February 6	Winnipeg	0–3		Pittsburgh	Hellebuyck	PPG Paints	17,086	30–13–5	65	
49	February 8	Winnipeg	1–4		Philadelphia	Brossoit	Wells Fargo Center	18,049	30–14–5	65	
50	February 10	Pittsburgh	1–2		Winnipeg	Hellebuyck	Canada Life Centre	15,225	31–14–5	67	
51	February 14	San Jose	0–1		Winnipeg	Hellebuyck	Canada Life Centre	13,786	32–14–5	69	
52	February 17	Winnipeg	4–2		Vancouver	Hellebuyck	Rogers Arena	18,992	33–14–5	71	
53	February 19	Winnipeg	3–6		Calgary	Hellebuyck	Scotiabank Saddledome	18,037	33–15–5	71	
54	February 20	Minnesota	3–6		Winnipeg	Brossoit	Canada Life Centre	14,707	34–15–5	73	
55	February 23	Winnipeg	3–2	OT	Chicago	Hellebuyck	United Center	18,891	35–15–5	75	
56	February 25	Arizona	3–4	OT	Winnipeg	Hellebuyck	Canada Life Centre	14,324	36–15–5	77	
57	February 27	St. Louis	2–4		Winnipeg	Brossoit	Canada Life Centre	13,139	37–15–5	79	
58	February 29	Winnipeg	1–4		Dallas	Hellebuyck	American Airlines Center	18,532	37–16–5	79	

March: 7–8–1 (home: 2–4–1; road: 5–4–0)

Game	Date	Visitor	Score	OT	Home	Decision	Location	Attendance	Record	Points	Recap
59	March 2	Winnipeg	5–3		Carolina	Hellebuyck	PNC Arena	18,876	38–16–5	81	
60	March 3	Winnipeg	5–2		Buffalo	Brossoit	KeyBank Center	14,171	39–16–5	83	
61	March 5	Seattle	4–3		Winnipeg	Hellebuyck	Canada Life Centre	13,125	39–17–5	83	
62	March 8	Winnipeg	3–0		Seattle	Brossoit	Climate Pledge Arena	17,151	40–17–5	85	
63	March 9	Winnipeg	0–5		Vancouver	Hellebuyck	Rogers Arena	18,948	40–18–5	85	
64	March 11	Washington	0–3		Winnipeg	Hellebuyck	Canada Life Centre	13,716	41–18–5	87	
65	March 13	Nashville	4–2		Winnipeg	Hellebuyck	Canada Life Centre	13,331	41–19–5	87	
66	March 15	Anaheim	0–6		Winnipeg	Brossoit	Canada Life Centre	15,225	42–19–5	89	
67	March 17	Winnipeg	6–1		Columbus	Hellebuyck	Nationwide Arena	16,193	43–19–5	91	
68	March 19	Winnipeg	4–2		NY Rangers	Hellebuyck	Madison Square Garden	18,006	44–19–5	93	
69	March 21	Winnipeg	1–4		New Jersey	Brossoit	Prudential Center	15,570	44–20–5	93	
70	March 23	Winnipeg	3–6		NY Islanders	Hellebuyck	UBS Arena	17,255	44–21–5	93	
71	March 24	Winnipeg	0–3		Washington	Hellebuyck	Capital One Arena	18,573	44–22–5	93	
72	March 26	Edmonton	4–3	OT	Winnipeg	Hellebuyck	Canada Life Centre	15,225	44–22–6	94	
73	March 28	Vegas	4–1		Winnipeg	Hellebuyck	Canada Life Centre	15,225	44–23–6	94	
74	March 30	Ottawa	3–2		Winnipeg	Hellebuyck	Canada Life Centre	15,225	44–24–6	94	

April: 8–0–0 (home: 4–0–0; road: 4–0–0)

Game	Date	Visitor	Score	OT	Home	Decision	Location	Attendance	Record	Points	Recap
75	April 1	Los Angeles	3–4		Winnipeg	Brossoit	Canada Life Centre	13,334	45–24–6	96	
76	April 4	Calgary	2–5		Winnipeg	Hellebuyck	Canada Life Centre	14,055	46–24–6	98	
77	April 6	Winnipeg	4–2		Minnesota	Hellebuyck	Xcel Energy Center	18,989	47–24–6	100	
78	April 9	Winnipeg	4–3	OT	Nashville	Hellebuyck	Bridgestone Arena	17,262	48–24–6	102	
79	April 11	Winnipeg	3–0		Dallas	Brossoit	American Airlines Center	18,532	49–24–6	104	
80	April 13	Winnipeg	7–0		Colorado	Hellebuyck	Ball Arena	18,121	50–24–6	106	
81	April 16	Seattle	3–4		Winnipeg	Hellebuyck	Canada Life Centre	15,225	51–24–6	108	
82	April 18	Vancouver	2–4		Winnipeg	Brossoit	Canada Life Centre	15,225	52–24–6	110	

2023–24 schedule

Win (2 Points) Loss (0 points) Overtime/shootout loss (1 point)

=== Playoffs ===
2024 Stanley Cup Playoffs
Western Conference first round vs. (C3) Colorado Avalanche: Colorado won 4–1

Game	Date	Visitor	Score	Home	OT	Decision	Attendance	Series	Recap
1	April 21	Colorado	6–7	Winnipeg		Hellebuyck	15,225	1–0	
2	April 23	Colorado	5–2	Winnipeg		Hellebuyck	15,225	1–1	
3	April 26	Winnipeg	2–6	Colorado		Hellebuyck	18,124	1–2	
4	April 28	Winnipeg	1–5	Colorado		Hellebuyck	18,129	1–3	
5	April 30	Colorado	6–3	Winnipeg		Hellebuyck	15,225	1–4	

Win Loss

== Player statistics ==
Key:

† Denotes player spent time with another team before joining the Jets. Stats reflect time with the Jets only.
‡ Denotes player was traded mid-season. Stats reflect time with the Jets only.

=== Skaters ===
Regular season
Player	GP	G	A	Pts	+/−	PIM
Mark Scheifele	74	25	47	72	19	57
Josh Morrissey	81	10	59	69	34	44
Kyle Connor	65	34	27	61	–6	6
Nikolaj Ehlers	82	25	36	61	27	29
Cole Perfetti	71	19	19	38	13	12
Vladislav Namestnikov	78	11	26	37	17	37
Gabriel Vilardi	47	22	14	36	11	14
Mason Appleton	82	14	22	36	16	26
Adam Lowry	81	12	23	35	17	57
Nino Niederreiter	77	18	16	34	12	34
Neal Pionk	82	5	28	33	9	63
Dylan DeMelo	82	3	28	31	46	36
Alex Iafallo	82	11	16	27	14	6
Sean Monahan^{†}	34	13	11	24	9	2
Brenden Dillon	77	8	12	20	20	92
Morgan Barron	80	11	7	18	10	23
Dylan Samberg	78	1	17	18	16	43
Nate Schmidt	63	2	12	14	10	16
Tyler Toffoli^{†}	18	7	4	11	9	2
David Gustafsson	39	3	4	7	+1	0
Axel Jonsson-Fjallby	26	2	3	5	6	0
Dominic Toninato	15	1	4	5	7	6
Logan Stanley	25	1	1	2	4	36
Nikita Chibrikov	1	1	0	1	0	0
Brad Lambert	1	0	1	1	+1	0
Declan Chisholm^{‡}	2	0	1	1	1	0
Rasmus Kupari	28	0	1	1	–5	4
Colin Miller^{†}	5	0	1	1	–2	2

Playoffs
Player	GP	G	A	Pts	+/−	PIM
Mark Scheifele	5	2	4	6	–6	0
Kyle Connor	5	3	2	5	–2	4
Josh Morrissey	5	3	1	4	–3	2
Gabriel Vilardi	5	0	4	4	–4	6
Brenden Dillon	3	0	3	3	+1	4
Adam Lowry	5	2	0	2	–3	7
Tyler Toffoli	5	2	0	2	–2	0
Mason Appleton	5	0	2	2	–4	6
Nikolaj Ehlers	5	0	2	2	–4	0
Nino Niederreiter	5	0	2	2	–5	4
David Gustafsson	4	1	0	1	–1	2
Nate Schmidt	3	1	0	1	–5	0
Vladislav Namestnikov	4	1	0	1	–3	2
Neal Pionk	5	0	1	1	–2	4
Alex Iafallo	5	0	1	1	–1	0
Logan Stanley	3	0	1	1	–1	6
Sean Monahan	5	0	1	1	–1	0
Colin Miller	1	0	1	1	+1	0
Dylan DeMelo	5	0	1	1	–1	2
Cole Perfetti	1	0	0	0	0	0
Dylan Samberg	5	0	0	0	–7	0
Axel Jonsson-Fjallby	1	0	0	0	–1	0

=== Goaltenders ===
Regular season
Player	GP	GS	TOI	W	L	OT	GA	GAA	SA	SV%	SO	G	A	PIM
Connor Hellebuyck	60	55	3,567:20	37	19	4	142	2.39	1,798	.921	5	0	0	2
Laurent Brossoit	23	22	1,351:02	15	5	2	45	2.00	620	.927	3	0	0	2

Playoffs
Player	GP	GS	TOI	W	L	GA	GAA	SA	SV%	SO	G	A	PIM
Connor Hellebuyck	5	5	275:17	1	4	24	5.23	177	.870	0	0	0	0
Laurent Brossoit	1	0	18:00	0	0	0	0.00	4	1.000	0	0	0	0

== Transactions ==
The Jets have been involved in the following transactions during the 2023–24 season.

Key:

† Contract is entry-level.
‡ Contract initially takes effect in the 2024-25 season.

=== Trades ===
Date	Details		Ref
July 2, 2023	To San Jose Sharks Leon Gawanke	To Winnipeg Jets Artemi Kniazev	
February 2, 2024	To Montreal Canadiens 1st-round pick in 2024; Conditional 3rd-round pick in 2027^{1}	To Winnipeg Jets Sean Monahan	
March 8, 2024	To New Jersey Devils 3rd-round pick in 2024; 2nd-round pick in 2025	To Winnipeg Jets Tyler Toffoli^{2}	
March 8, 2024	To New Jersey Devils 4th-round pick in 2026	To Winnipeg Jets Colin Miller	

^{1}Montreal will receive pick if Winnipeg wins Stanley Cup in 2024.
^{2}New Jersey retains 50% of Toffoli’s salary through the 2023–24 season.

=== Players acquired ===
Date	Player	Former team	Term	Via	Ref
July 1, 2023	Laurent Brossoit	Vegas Golden Knights	1-year	Free agency	
July 1, 2023	Collin Delia	Vancouver Canucks	1-year	Free agency	
July 1, 2023	Jeffrey Viel	San Jose Sharks	1-year	Free agency	

=== Players lost ===
Date	Player	New team	Term	Via	Ref
July 1, 2023	Arvid Holm	Colorado Avalanche	1-year	Free agency	
July 3, 2023	Alex Limoges	Washington Capitals	1-year	Free agency	
July 5, 2023	Karson Kuhlman	New York Islanders	1-year	Free agency	
July 26, 2023	Evan Cormier	Charlotte Checkers (AHL)	1-year	Free agency	
October 2, 2023	Jansen Harkins	Wilkes-Barre/Scranton Penguins (AHL)		Waivers	
October 23, 2023	Sam Gagner	Bakersfield Condors (AHL)	1-year	Free agency	
January 29, 2024	Declan Chisholm	Minnesota Wild		Waivers	

=== Signings ===
Date	Player	Term	Ref
July 1, 2023	Vladislav Namestnikov	2-year	
July 3, 2023	Axel Jonsson-Fjallby	2-year	
July 5, 2023	Dominic DiVincentiis	3-year†	
July 5, 2023	Dylan Samberg	2-year	
July 17, 2023	Morgan Barron	2-year	
July 19, 2023	Gabriel Vilardi	2-year	
August 2, 2023	Rasmus Kupari	2-year	
September 21, 2023	Colby Barlow	3-year†	
October 9, 2023	Connor Hellebuyck	7-year‡	
October 9, 2023	Mark Scheifele	7-year‡	
December 4, 2023	Nino Neiderreiter	3-year‡	
May 3, 2024	Thomas Milic	3-year†	
June 25, 2024	Dylan DeMelo	4-year	

== Draft picks ==
Below are the Winnipeg Jets' selections at the 2023 NHL entry draft, which was held on June 28 to 29, 2023, at Bridgestone Arena in Nashville.

Round	#	Player	Pos.	Nationality	Team (League)
1	18	Colby Barlow	LW	Canada	Owen Sound Attack (OHL)
3	82	Zach Nehring	RW	United States	Shattuck-St. Mary's Sabres (USHS-Prep)
5	146	Jacob Julien	C	Canada	London Knights (OHL)
5	151	Thomas Milic	G	Canada	Seattle Thunderbirds (WHL)
7	210	Connor Levis	RW	Canada	Kamloops Blazers (WHL)
