= 2023–24 Columbus Blue Jackets season =

National Hockey League season

2023–24 Columbus Blue Jackets
- Division: 8th Metropolitan
- Conference: 16th Eastern
- 2023–24 record: 27–43–12
- Home record: 17–19–5
- Road record: 10–24–7
- Goals for: 237
- Goals against: 300

Team information
- General manager: Jarmo Kekäläinen (Oct. 12 – Feb. 15); John Davidson (interim, Feb. 15 – Apr. 16)
- Coach: Pascal Vincent
- Captain: Boone Jenner
- Alternate captains: Erik Gudbranson; Sean Kuraly; Zach Werenski
- Arena: Nationwide Arena
- Average attendance: 17,009
- Minor league affiliate: Cleveland Monsters (AHL)

Team leaders
- Goals: Kirill Marchenko (23)
- Assists: Johnny Gaudreau (48)
- Points: Johnny Gaudreau (60)
- Penalty minutes: Erik Gudbranson (74)
- Plus/minus: Nick Blankenburg; Luca Del Bel Belluz (+1)
- Wins: Elvis Merzlikins (13)
- Goals against average: Malcolm Subban (3.00)

The 2023–24 Columbus Blue Jackets season was the 24th season for the National Hockey League (NHL) franchise that was established on June 25, 1997.

In the off-season, on July 1, 2023, the Blue Jackets hired Mike Babcock as head coach. However, Babcock resigned after the conclusion of an investigation about improper behavior with players on September 17, and was replaced by Pascal Vincent.

On March 24, 2024, the Blue Jackets were eliminated from playoff contention for the fourth consecutive season for the first time since the 2009–10 season and the 2012–13 season following the Washington Capitals' 3–0 win against the Winnipeg Jets. for the first time in franchise history they finshied last in the confernce for the second year in a row.

== Standings ==
=== Divisional standings ===
Metropolitan Division
Pos	Team	GP	W	L	OTL	RW	GF	GA	GD	Pts
1	p – New York Rangers	82	55	23	4	43	282	229	+53	114
2	x – Carolina Hurricanes	82	52	23	7	44	279	216	+63	111
3	x – New York Islanders	82	39	27	16	29	246	263	−17	94
4	x – Washington Capitals	82	40	31	11	32	220	257	−37	91
5	Pittsburgh Penguins	82	38	32	12	32	255	251	+4	88
6	Philadelphia Flyers	82	38	33	11	30	235	261	−26	87
7	New Jersey Devils	82	38	39	5	33	264	283	−19	81
8	Columbus Blue Jackets	82	27	43	12	21	237	300	−63	66

Source: National Hockey League
Rules for classification: 1) Fewer number of games played (GP, only during regular season); 2) Greater number of regulation wins (RW); 3) Greater number of wins in regulation and overtime, excluding shootout wins (ROW); 4) Greater number of total wins, including shootouts (W); 5) Greater number of points earned in head-to-head play; if teams played an uneven number of head-to-head games, the result of the first game on the home ice of the team with the extra home game is discarded; 6) Greater goal differential (GD); 7) Greater number of goals scored (GF)
p – Clinched Presidents' Trophy; x – Clinched playoff spot

=== Conference standings ===
Eastern Conference Wild Card
Pos	Div	Team	GP	W	L	OTL	RW	GF	GA	GD	Pts
1	AT	x – Tampa Bay Lightning	82	45	29	8	37	291	268	+23	98
2	ME	x – Washington Capitals	82	40	31	11	32	220	257	−37	91
3	AT	Detroit Red Wings	82	41	32	9	27	278	274	+4	91
4	ME	Pittsburgh Penguins	82	38	32	12	32	255	251	+4	88
5	ME	Philadelphia Flyers	82	38	33	11	30	235	261	−26	87
6	AT	Buffalo Sabres	82	39	37	6	33	246	244	+2	84
7	ME	New Jersey Devils	82	38	39	5	33	264	283	−19	81
8	AT	Ottawa Senators	82	37	41	4	25	255	281	−26	78
9	AT	Montreal Canadiens	82	30	36	16	20	236	289	−53	76
10	ME	Columbus Blue Jackets	82	27	43	12	21	237	300	−63	66

Source: National Hockey League
Rules for classification: 1) Fewer number of games played (GP, only during regular season); 2) Greater number of regulation wins (RW); 3) Greater number of wins in regulation and overtime, excluding shootout wins (ROW); 4) Greater number of total wins, including shootouts (W); 5) Greater number of points earned in head-to-head play; if teams played an uneven number of head-to-head games, the result of the first game on the home ice of the team with the extra home game is discarded; 6) Greater goal differential (GD); 7) Greater number of goals scored (GF)
x – Clinched playoff spot

== Schedule and results ==
=== Preseason ===
The Columbus Blue Jackets preseason schedule was released on June 22, 2023.

2023 preseason game log: 4–3–1 (home: 3–1–0; road: 1–2–1)
#	Date	Visitor	Score	Home	OT	Decision	Attendance	Record	Recap
1^{[A]}	September 24	Columbus	2–3	Pittsburgh	SO	Dell	13,341	0–0–1	Recap
2^{[A]}	September 24	Pittsburgh	3–4	Columbus	OT	Cajan	13,255	1–0–1	Recap
3	September 26	Columbus	2–3	St. Louis		Dell	15,417	1–1–1	Recap
4	September 30	Columbus	3–4	Buffalo		Merzlikins	12,209	1–2–1	Recap
5	October 2	St. Louis	3–5	Columbus		Greaves	10,239	2–2–1	Recap
6	October 4	Buffalo	3–5	Columbus		Merzlikins	10,169	3–2–1	Recap
7	October 5	Washington	4–2	Columbus		Martin	11,491	3–3–1	Recap
8	October 7	Columbus	4–2	Washington		Merzlikins	12,961	4–3–1	Recap
Notes:^{A} Indicates split-squad.

=== Regular season ===
The Columbus Blue Jackets regular season schedule was released on June 27, 2023.

2023–24 game log

October: 3–4–2 (home: 2–3–1; road: 1–1–1)
#	Date	Visitor	Score	Home	OT	Decision	Attendance	Record	Pts	Recap
1	October 12	Philadelphia	4–2	Columbus		Merzlikins	18,614	0–1–0	0
2	October 14	NY Rangers	3–5	Columbus		Merzlikins	16,520	1–1–0	2
3	October 16	Detroit	4–0	Columbus		Martin	14,959	1–2–0	2
4	October 20	Calgary	1–3	Columbus		Martin	16,276	2–2–0	4
5	October 21	Columbus	5–4	Minnesota	OT	Merzlikins	18,479	3–2–0	6
6	October 24	Anaheim	3–2	Columbus	OT	Merzlikins	16,432	3–2–1	7
7	October 26	Columbus	3–4	Montreal	OT	Merzlikins	21,105	3–2–2	8
8	October 28	NY Islanders	2–0	Columbus		Martin	15,424	3–3–2	8
9	October 30	Columbus	3–5	Dallas		Merzlikins	18,532	3–4–2	8

November: 4–9–2 (home: 3–4–0; road: 1–5–2)
#	Date	Visitor	Score	Home	OT	Decision	Attendance	Record	Pts	Recap
10	November 2	Tampa Bay	2–4	Columbus		Merzlikins	14,276	4–4–2	10
11	November 4	Columbus	1–2	Washington		Merzlikins	18,573	4–5–2	10
12	November 6	Columbus	4–5	Florida	OT	Martin	17,103	4–5–3	11
13	November 9	Dallas	5–2	Columbus		Martin	15,253	4–6–3	11
14	November 11	Columbus	4–5	Detroit		Martin	19,156	4–7–3	11
15	November 12	Columbus	3–4	NY Rangers	SO	Merzlikins	18,006	4–7–4	12
16	November 14	Pittsburgh	5–3	Columbus		Merzlikins	16,596	4–8–4	12
17	November 16	Arizona	3–2	Columbus		Merzlikins	15,909	4–9–4	12
18	November 18	Columbus	3–4	Washington		Merzlikins	18,573	4–10–4	12
19	November 19	Columbus	2–5	Philadelphia		Martin	17,416	4–11–4	12
20	November 22	Chicago	3–7	Columbus		Merzlikins	18,158	5–11–4	14
21	November 24	Columbus	2–1	New Jersey		Merzlikins	16,514	6–11–4	16
22	November 26	Columbus	2–3	Carolina		Merzlikins	18,700	6–12–4	16
23	November 27	Boston	2–5	Columbus		Martin	14,357	7–12–4	18
24	November 29	Montreal	4–2	Columbus		Merzlikins	14,316	7–13–4	18

December: 5–5–4 (home: 3–3–2; road: 2–2–2)
#	Date	Visitor	Score	Home	OT	Decision	Attendance	Record	Pts	Recap
25	December 1	Ottawa	2–4	Columbus		Merzlikins	15,552	8–13–4	20
26	December 3	Columbus	1–3	Boston		Martin	17,850	8–14–4	20
27	December 5	Los Angeles	4–3	Columbus	OT	Merzlikins	15,088	8–14–5	21
28	December 7	Columbus	3–7	NY Islanders		Martin	13,510	8–15–5	21
29	December 8	St. Louis	2–5	Columbus		Greaves	15,713	9–15–5	23
30	December 10	Florida	5–2	Columbus		Greaves	16,269	9–16–5	23
31	December 14	Columbus	6–5	Toronto	OT	Merzlikins	18,338	10–16–5	25
32	December 16	New Jersey	6–3	Columbus		Tarasov	18,172	10–17–5	25
33	December 19	Columbus	9–4	Buffalo		Tarasov	14,888	11–17–5	27
34	December 21	Washington	3–2	Columbus	OT	Merzlikins	18,172	11–17–6	28
35	December 23	Toronto	4–1	Columbus		Tarasov	17,806	11–18–6	28
36	December 27	Columbus	3–4	New Jersey	OT	Merzlikins	16,514	11–18–7	29
37	December 29	Toronto	5–6	Columbus	OT	Martin	18,516	12–18–7	31
38	December 30	Columbus	2–3	Buffalo	OT	Tarasov	19,070	12–18–8	32

January: 4–6–2 (home: 1–3–1; road: 3–3–1)
#	Date	Visitor	Score	Home	OT	Decision	Attendance	Record	Pts	Recap
39	January 2	Boston	4–1	Columbus		Martin	18,262	12–19–8	32
40	January 4	Columbus	3–2	Philadelphia	SO	Tarasov	17,510	13–19–8	34
41	January 6	Minnesota	4–3	Columbus	OT	Tarasov	18,771	13–19–9	35
42	January 9	Columbus	0–5	Winnipeg		Tarasov	12,512	13–20–9	35
43	January 13	Seattle	7–4	Columbus		Tarasov	18,588	13–21–9	35
44	January 15	Vancouver	3–4	Columbus	SO	Merzlikins	17,622	14–21–9	37
45	January 19	New Jersey	4–1	Columbus		Merzlikins	18,630	14–22–9	37
46	January 23	Columbus	1–4	Edmonton		Merzlikins	18,347	14–23–9	37
47	January 25	Columbus	5–2	Calgary		Tarasov	16,889	15–23–9	39
48	January 27	Columbus	4–5	Vancouver	OT	Merzlikins	19,002	15–23–10	40
49	January 28	Columbus	2–4	Seattle		Tarasov	17,151	15–24–10	40
50	January 30	Columbus	1–0	St. Louis		Merzlikins	18,096	16–24–10	42

February: 3–6–0 (home: 1–3–0; road: 2–3–0)
#	Date	Visitor	Score	Home	OT	Decision	Attendance	Record	Pts	Recap
51	February 10	Tampa Bay	4–2	Columbus		Merzlikins	18,876	16–25–10	42
52	February 13	Columbus	3–6	Ottawa		Tarasov	15,203	16–26–10	42
53	February 17	Columbus	4–3	San Jose		Merzlikins	17,435	17–26–10	44
54	February 20	Columbus	1–5	Los Angeles		Merzlikins	16,980	17–27–10	44
55	February 21	Columbus	7–4	Anaheim		Tarasov	14,518	18–27–10	46
56	February 23	Buffalo	2–1	Columbus		Tarasov	18,943	18–28–10	46
57	February 25	NY Rangers	2–4	Columbus		Merzlikins	18,293	19–28–10	48
58	February 28	Columbus	1–4	NY Rangers		Merzlikins	18,006	19–29–10	48
59	February 29	Carolina	4–2	Columbus		Tarasov	18,390	19–30–10	48

March: 5–8–2 (home: 4–2–1; road: 1–6–1)
#	Date	Visitor	Score	Home	OT	Decision	Attendance	Record	Pts	Recap
60	March 2	Columbus	5–2	Chicago		Merzlikins	18,782	20–30–10	50
61	March 4	Vegas	3–6	Columbus		Tarasov	17,338	21–30–10	52
62	March 5	Columbus	3–5	Pittsburgh		Greaves	17,072	21–31–10	52
63	March 7	Edmonton	2–4	Columbus		Tarasov	17,718	22–31–10	54
64	March 9	Nashville	2–1	Columbus		Tarasov	17,602	22–32–10	54
65	March 12	Columbus	0–3	Montreal		Tarasov	21,105	22–33–10	54
66	March 14	Ottawa	3–2	Columbus	SO	Merzlikins	15,667	22–33–11	55
67	March 16	San Jose	2–4	Columbus		Tarasov	16,967	23–33–11	57
68	March 17	Winnipeg	6–1	Columbus		Merzlikins	16,193	23–34–11	57
69	March 19	Columbus	3–4	Detroit	OT	Tarasov	17,707	23–34–12	58
70	March 22	Columbus	1–6	Colorado		Merzlikins	18,117	23–35–12	58
71	March 23	Columbus	2–4	Vegas		Tarasov	18,225	23–36–12	58
72	March 26	Columbus	2–6	Arizona		Merzlikins	4,600	23–37–12	58
73	March 28	Columbus	2–3	Pittsburgh		Tarasov	18,191	23–38–12	58
74	March 30	Pittsburgh	3–4	Columbus	SO	Merzlikins	18,873	24–38–12	60

April: 3–5–0 (home: 3–1–0; road: 0–4–0)
#	Date	Visitor	Score	Home	OT	Decision	Attendance	Record	Pts	Recap
75	April 1	Colorado	1–4	Columbus		Tarasov	16,731	25–38–12	62
76	April 4	NY Islanders	4–2	Columbus		Greaves	16,213	25–39–12	62
77	April 6	Philadelphia	2–6	Columbus		Greaves	18,323	26–39–12	64
78	April 7	Columbus	0–3	Carolina		Subban	18,837	26–40–12	64
79	April 9	Columbus	2–5	Tampa Bay		Greaves	19,092	26–41–12	64
80	April 11	Columbus	0–4	Florida		Greaves	18,451	26–42–12	64
81	April 13	Columbus	4–6	Nashville		Greaves	17,282	26–43–12	64
82	April 16	Carolina	3-6	Columbus		Greaves	17,289	27–43–12	66

Legend: Win (2 points) Loss (0 points) Overtime/shootout loss (1 point)

== Player statistics ==
As of April 16, 2024

=== Skaters ===
Regular season
Player	GP	G	A	Pts	+/−	PIM
Johnny Gaudreau	81	12	48	60	–27	22
Zach Werenski	70	11	46	57	0	22
Kirill Marchenko	78	23	19	42	−5	14
Boone Jenner	58	22	13	35	−8	28
Dmitri Voronkov	75	18	16	34	−6	52
Cole Sillinger	77	13	19	32	−4	46
Ivan Provorov	82	5	27	32	−11	20
Alexandre Texier	78	12	18	30	−5	38
Egor Chinakhov	53	16	13	29	−3	6
Damon Severson	67	9	19	28	–10	51
Adam Fantilli	49	12	15	27	−21	16
Justin Danforth	71	10	16	26	–10	26
Erik Gudbranson	78	6	20	26	−14	74
Jack Roslovic^{‡}	40	6	17	23	−9	14
Sean Kuraly	62	9	9	18	−5	40
Kent Johnson	42	6	10	16	−2	10
Alexander Nylander^{†}	23	11	3	14	−1	6
Jake Bean	72	4	9	13	−10	32
Mathieu Olivier	54	5	7	12	−4	70
Emil Bemstrom^{‡}	32	5	6	11	−5	10
David Jiricek	43	1	9	10	–4	22
Adam Boqvist	35	1	9	10	–8	0
Patrik Laine	18	6	3	9	−10	6
Andrew Peeke^{‡}	23	1	7	8	−2	6
James Malatesta	11	2	1	3	–1	4
Brendan Gaunce	24	2	2	4	–1	6
Trey Fix-Wolansky	11	2	1	3	0	2
Carson Meyer	14	1	1	2	−2	2
Mikael Pyyhtia	17	0	2	2	−5	0
Jake Christiansen	12	0	2	2	−5	2
Nick Blankenburg	12	1	0	1	+1	4
Luca Del Bel Belluz	1	1	0	1	+1	0
Eric Robinson^{‡}	7	1	0	1	−3	0
Gavin Brindley	1	0	0	0	0	0
Cameron Butler	1	0	0	0	0	0
Tyler Angle	2	0	0	0	−1	0
Liam Foudy^{‡}	1	0	0	0	0	0

=== Goaltenders ===
Regular season
Player	GP	GS	TOI	W	L	OT	GA	GAA	SA	SV%	SO	G	A	PIM
Elvis Merzlikins	41	40	2,258:40	13	17	8	121	3.45	1,266	.897	1	0	0	4
Daniil Tarasov	24	23	1,376:28	8	11	3	63	3.18	796	.908	0	0	0	0
Jet Greaves	9	8	515:52	3	6	0	30	3.49	327	.908	0	0	0	0
Spencer Martin^{‡}	13	10	707:13	3	8	1	43	3.65	379	.887	0	0	0	0
Malcolm Subban	1	1	60:00	0	1	0	3	3.00	35	.914	0	0	0	0

^{†}Denotes player spent time with another team before joining the Blue Jackets. Stats reflect time with the Blue Jackets only.
^{‡}Denotes player was traded mid-season. Stats reflect time with the Blue Jackets only.
Bold/italics denotes franchise record.

== Transactions ==
The Blue Jackets have been involved in the following transactions during the 2023–24 season.

=== Key ===
† Contract is entry-level.
‡ Contract initially takes effect in the 2024–25 season.

=== Trades ===
Date	Details		Ref
June 29, 2023	To Vegas Golden Knights 7th-round pick in 2023	To Columbus Blue Jackets 7th-round pick in 2024	
December 6, 2023	To Buffalo Sabres Eric Robinson	To Columbus Blue Jackets conditional NSH 7th-round pick in 2025	
February 22, 2024	To Pittsburgh Penguins Emil Bemstrom	To Columbus Blue Jackets Alexander Nylander conditional 6th-round pick in 2026	
March 8, 2024	To New York Rangers Jack Roslovic (50% retained)	To Columbus Blue Jackets Conditional 4th-round pick in 2026	
March 8, 2024	To Boston Bruins Andrew Peeke	To Columbus Blue Jackets Jakub Zboril; 3rd-round pick in 2027	
March 8, 2024	To St. Louis Blues Future considerations	To Columbus Blue Jackets Malcolm Subban	

=== Players acquired ===
Date	Player	Former team	Term	Via	Ref
September 29, 2023	Spencer Martin	Vancouver Canucks		Waivers	
March 1, 2024	Max McCue	London Knights (OHL)	3-year†‡	Free agency	

=== Players lost ===
Date	Player	New team	Term	Via	Ref
July 1, 2023	Lane Pederson	Edmonton Oilers	2-year	Free agency	
July 1, 2023	Justin Richards	Buffalo Sabres	1-year	Free agency	
July 2, 2023	Gavin Bayreuther	Dallas Stars	1-year	Free agency	
September 12, 2023	Joona Luoto	SC Bern (NL)	1-year	Free agency	
October 6, 2023	Michael Hutchinson	Grand Rapids Griffins (AHL)	1-year	Free agency	
October 11, 2023	Tim Berni	Genève-Servette HC (NL)	4-year	Free agency	
October 21, 2023	Liam Foudy	Nashville Predators		Waivers	
January 19, 2024	Spencer Martin	Carolina Hurricanes		Waivers	

=== Signings ===
Date	Player	Term	Ref
June 30, 2023	Marcus Bjork	1-year	
July 1, 2023	Adam Fantilli	3-year†	
October 11, 2023	Justin Danforth	1-year‡	
April 15, 2024	Gavin Brindley	3-year†	

== Draft picks ==
Below are the Columbus Blue Jackets' selections at the 2023 NHL entry draft, which was held on June 28 to 29, 2023, at Bridgestone Arena in Nashville.

Round	#	Player	Pos.	Nationality	Team (League)
1	3	Adam Fantilli	C	Canada	Michigan Wolverines (B1G)
2	34	Gavin Brindley	C	United States	Michigan Wolverines (B1G)
3	66	William Whitelaw	RW	United States	Youngstown Phantoms (USHL)
4	98	Andrew Strathmann	D	United States	Youngstown Phantoms (USHL)
4	114	Luca Pinelli	C	Canada	Ottawa 67's (OHL)
5	156	Melvin Strahl	G	Sweden	Modo Hockey (J20 Nationell)
7	194	Oiva Keskinen	C	Finland	Tappara (U20 SM-sarja)
7	224	Tyler Peddle	LW	Canada	Drummondville Voltigeurs (QMJHL)
