= 2023–24 St. Louis Blues season =

National Hockey League season

2023–24 St. Louis Blues
- Division: 5th Central
- Conference: 9th Western
- 2023–24 record: 43–33–6
- Home record: 25–14–2
- Road record: 18–19–4
- Goals for: 239
- Goals against: 250

Team information
- General manager: Doug Armstrong
- Coach: Craig Berube (Oct. 12 – Dec. 12); Drew Bannister (interim, Dec. 12 – Apr. 17)
- Captain: Brayden Schenn
- Alternate captains: Justin Faulk; Colton Parayko; Robert Thomas
- Average attendance: 18,084
- Minor league affiliate: Springfield Thunderbirds (AHL)

Team leaders
- Goals: Jordan Kyrou (31)
- Assists: Robert Thomas (60)
- Points: Robert Thomas (86)
- Penalty minutes: Brayden Schenn (56)
- Plus/minus: Nick Leddy (+14)
- Wins: Jordan Binnington (28)
- Goals against average: Joel Hofer (2.65)

The 2023–24 St. Louis Blues season was the 57th season for the National Hockey League (NHL) franchise that was established in 1967.

Following a 6–4 home loss to the Detroit Red Wings on December 12, 2023, head coach Craig Berube was fired. Drew Bannister, head coach of the Blues' AHL affiliate Springfield Thunderbirds, was named interim head coach.

On April 12, 2024, the Blues were eliminated from playoff contention for the second straight season for the first time since the 2009–10 season and the 2010–11 season following a 5–2 loss to the Carolina Hurricanes and a 7–2 win by the Vegas Golden Knights over the Minnesota Wild.

== Standings ==
=== Divisional standings ===
Central Division
Pos	Team	GP	W	L	OTL	RW	GF	GA	GD	Pts
1	z – Dallas Stars	82	52	21	9	40	298	234	+64	113
2	x – Winnipeg Jets	82	52	24	6	46	259	199	+60	110
3	x – Colorado Avalanche	82	50	25	7	42	304	254	+50	107
4	x – Nashville Predators	82	47	30	5	38	269	248	+21	99
5	St. Louis Blues	82	43	33	6	31	239	250	−11	92
6	Minnesota Wild	82	39	34	9	32	251	263	−12	87
7	Arizona Coyotes	82	36	41	5	28	256	274	−18	77
8	Chicago Blackhawks	82	23	53	6	17	179	290	−111	52

Source: National Hockey League
Rules for classification: 1) Fewer number of games played (GP, only during regular season); 2) Greater number of regulation wins (RW); 3) Greater number of wins in regulation and overtime, excluding shootout wins (ROW); 4) Greater number of total wins, including shootouts (W); 5) Greater number of points earned in head-to-head play; if teams played an uneven number of head-to-head games, the result of the first game on the home ice of the team with the extra home game is discarded; 6) Greater goal differential (GD); 7) Greater number of goals scored (GF)
x – Clinched playoff spot; z – Clinched conference

=== Conference standings ===
Western Conference Wild Card
Pos	Div	Team	GP	W	L	OTL	RW	GF	GA	GD	Pts
1	CE	x – Nashville Predators	82	47	30	5	38	269	248	+21	99
2	PA	x – Vegas Golden Knights	82	45	29	8	34	267	245	+22	98
3	CE	St. Louis Blues	82	43	33	6	31	239	250	−11	92
4	CE	Minnesota Wild	82	39	34	9	32	251	263	−12	87
5	PA	Calgary Flames	82	38	39	5	32	253	271	−18	81
6	PA	Seattle Kraken	82	34	35	13	28	217	236	−19	81
7	CE	Arizona Coyotes	82	36	41	5	28	256	274	−18	77
8	PA	Anaheim Ducks	82	27	50	5	21	204	295	−91	59
9	CE	Chicago Blackhawks	82	23	53	6	17	179	290	−111	52
10	PA	San Jose Sharks	82	19	54	9	14	181	331	−150	47

Source: National Hockey League
Rules for classification: 1) Fewer number of games played (GP, only during regular season); 2) Greater number of regulation wins (RW); 3) Greater number of wins in regulation and overtime, excluding shootout wins (ROW); 4) Greater number of total wins, including shootouts (W); 5) Greater number of points earned in head-to-head play; if teams played an uneven number of head-to-head games, the result of the first game on the home ice of the team with the extra home game is discarded; 6) Greater goal differential (GD); 7) Greater number of goals scored (GF)
x – Clinched playoff spot

== Schedule and results ==
=== Preseason ===
The Blues preseason schedule was released on June 23, 2023.

2023 preseason game log: 4–2–2 (home: 3–0–1; road: 1–2–1)
#	Date	Visitor	Score	Home	Decision	Location	Attendance	Record	Recap
1	September 23	Arizona	2–3	St. Louis	Hofer	Enterprise Center	16,314	1–0–0	Recap
2	September 23	St. Louis	1–5	Arizona	Subban	Intrust Bank Arena	6,324	1–1–0	Recap
3	September 26	Columbus	2–3	St. Louis	Subban	Enterprise Center	15,417	2–1–0	Recap
4	September 28	St. Louis	1–2	Chicago	Hofer	United Center	9,947	2–1–1	Recap
5	September 30	Dallas	4–3	St. Louis	Binnington	Cable Dahmer Arena	5,800	2–1–2	Recap
6	October 2	St. Louis	3–5	Columbus	Hofer	Nationwide Arena	10,239	2–2–2	Recap
7	October 5	St. Louis	4–0	Dallas	Binnington	American Airlines Center	15,365	3–2–2	Recap
8	October 7	Chicago	3–5	St. Louis	Binnington	Enterprise Center	17,154	4–2–2	Recap
Legend: Win Loss OT/SO Loss

=== Regular season ===
The regular season schedule was published on June 27, 2023.

2023–24 game log

October: 3–3–1 (home: 2–1–0; road: 1–2–1)
#	Date	Visitor	Score	Home	OT	Decision	Attendance	Record	Pts	Recap
1	October 12	St. Louis	1–2	Dallas	SO	Binnington	18,532	0–0–1	1
2	October 14	Seattle	1–2	St. Louis	SO	Binnington	18,096	1–0–1	3
3	October 19	Arizona	6–2	St. Louis		Hofer	18,096	1–1–1	3
4	October 21	Pittsburgh	2–4	St. Louis		Binnington	18,096	2–1–1	5
5	October 24	St. Louis	2–4	Winnipeg		Binnington	11,136	2–2–1	5
6	October 26	St. Louis	3–0	Calgary		Hofer	16,897	3–2–1	7
7	October 27	St. Louis	0–5	Vancouver		Binnington	18,548	3–3–1	7

November: 9–6–0 (home: 5–2–0; road: 4–4–0)
#	Date	Visitor	Score	Home	OT	Decision	Attendance	Record	Pts	Recap
8	November 1	St. Louis	1–4	Colorado		Binnington	18,091	3–4–1	7
9	November 3	New Jersey	1–4	St. Louis		Binnington	18,096	4–4–1	9
10	November 4	Montreal	3–6	St. Louis		Hofer	18,096	5–4–1	11
11	November 7	Winnipeg	5–2	St. Louis		Binnington	18,096	5–5–1	11
12	November 9	Arizona	1–2	St. Louis		Hofer	18,096	6–5–1	13
13	November 11	St. Louis	8–2	Colorado		Binnington	18,132	7–5–1	15
14	November 14	Tampa Bay	0–5	St. Louis		Binnington	17,621	8–5–1	17
15	November 16	St. Louis	1–5	San Jose		Hofer	10,452	8–6–1	17
16	November 18	St. Louis	1–5	Los Angeles		Binnington	18,145	8–7–1	17
17	November 19	St. Louis	3–1	Anaheim		Hofer	15,243	9–7–1	19
18	November 22	St. Louis	6–5	Arizona		Hofer	4,600	10–7–1	21
19	November 24	Nashville	8–3	St. Louis		Hofer	18,096	10–8–1	21
20	November 26	St. Louis	4–2	Chicago		Binnington	18,223	11–8–1	23
21	November 28	St. Louis	1–3	Minnesota		Binnington	17,563	11–9–1	23
22	November 30	Buffalo	4–6	St. Louis		Binnington	18,096	12–9–1	25

December: 6–8–0 (home: 4–3–0; road: 2–5–0)
#	Date	Visitor	Score	Home	OT	Decision	Attendance	Record	Pts	Recap
23	December 2	St. Louis	1–4	Arizona		Hofer	4,600	12–10–1	25
24	December 4	St. Louis	2–1	Vegas	OT	Binnington	17,826	13–10–1	27
25	December 6	Vegas	6–3	St. Louis		Binnington	18,096	13–11–1	27
26	December 8	St. Louis	2–5	Columbus		Hofer	15,713	13–12–1	27
27	December 9	St. Louis	1–3	Chicago		Binnington	18,892	13–13–1	27
28	December 12	Detroit	6–4	St. Louis		Binnington	18,096	13–14–1	27
29	December 14	Ottawa	2–4	St. Louis		Binnington	18,096	14–14–1	29
30	December 16	Dallas	3–4	St. Louis	OT	Binnington	18,096	15–14–1	31
31	December 19	St. Louis	1–6	Tampa Bay		Binnington	19,092	15–15–1	31
32	December 21	St. Louis	4–1	Florida		Hofer	18,753	16–15–1	33
33	December 23	Chicago	5–7	St. Louis		Binnington	18,096	17–15–1	35
34	December 27	Dallas	1–2	St. Louis		Hofer	18,096	18–15–1	37
35	December 29	Colorado	2–1	St. Louis		Binnington	18,096	18–16–1	37
36	December 30	St. Louis	2–4	Pittsburgh		Hofer	18,321	18–17–1	37

January: 8–4–1 (home: 4–3–1; road: 4–1–0)
#	Date	Visitor	Score	Home	OT	Decision	Attendance	Record	Pts	Recap
37	January 4	Vancouver	1–2	St. Louis		Binnington	18,096	19–17–1	39
38	January 6	St. Louis	2–1	Carolina	SO	Binnington	18,903	20–17–1	41
39	January 9	Florida	5–1	St. Louis		Hofer	18,096	20–18–1	41
40	January 11	NY Rangers	2–5	St. Louis		Binnington	18,096	21–18–1	43
41	January 13	Boston	4–3	St. Louis	OT	Binnington	18,096	21–18–2	44
42	January 15	Philadelphia	4–2	St. Louis		Hofer	18,096	21–19–2	44
43	January 18	St. Louis	2–5	Washington		Binnington	17,909	21–20–2	44
44	January 20	Washington	0–3	St. Louis		Binnington	18,096	22–20–2	46
45	January 23	St. Louis	4–3	Calgary		Binnington	16,813	23–20–2	48
46	January 24	St. Louis	4–3	Vancouver	OT	Hofer	19,003	24–20–2	50
47	January 26	St. Louis	4–3	Seattle	OT	Binnington	17,151	25–20–2	52
48	January 28	Los Angeles	3–4	St. Louis	OT	Hofer	18,096	26–20–2	54
49	January 30	Columbus	1–0	St. Louis		Binnington	18,096	26–21–2	54

February: 4–5–1 (home: 2–2–0; road: 2–3–1)
#	Date	Visitor	Score	Home	OT	Decision	Attendance	Record	Pts	Recap
50	February 10	St. Louis	3–1	Buffalo		Hofer	16,726	27–21–2	56
51	February 11	St. Louis	7–2	Montreal		Binnington	21,105	28–21–2	58
52	February 13	St. Louis	1–4	Toronto		Binnington	18,307	28–22–2	58
53	February 15	Edmonton	3–6	St. Louis		Binnington	18,096	29–22–2	60
54	February 17	Nashville	5–2	St. Louis		Binnington	18,096	29–23–2	60
55	February 19	Toronto	4–2	St. Louis		Hofer	18,096	29–24–2	60
56	February 22	NY Islanders	0–4	St. Louis		Binnington	18,096	30–24–2	62
57	February 24	St. Louis	1–6	Detroit		Binnington	19,525	30–25–2	62
58	February 27	St. Louis	2–4	Winnipeg		Hofer	13,139	30–26–2	62
59	February 28	St. Louis	2–3	Edmonton	OT	Binnington	18,347	30–26–3	63

March: 9–5–1 (home: 5–2–1; road: 4–3–0)
#	Date	Visitor	Score	Home	OT	Decision	Attendance	Record	Pts	Recap
60	March 2	Minnesota	1–3	St. Louis		Binnington	18,096	31–26–3	65
61	March 4	St. Louis	2–1	Philadelphia	SO	Binnington	18,728	32–26–3	67
62	March 5	St. Louis	2–4	NY Islanders		Hofer	16,540	32–27–3	67
63	March 7	St. Louis	1–4	New Jersey		Binnington	16,259	32–28–3	67
64	March 9	St. Louis	0–4	NY Rangers		Binnington	18,006	32–29–3	67
65	March 11	St. Louis	5–1	Boston		Hofer	17,850	33–29–3	69
66	March 13	Los Angeles	1–3	St. Louis		Binnington	18,096	34–29–3	71
67	March 16	Minnesota	2–3	St. Louis	SO	Binnington	18,096	35–29–3	73
68	March 17	Anaheim	2–4	St. Louis		Hofer	18,096	36–29–3	75
69	March 19	Colorado	4–3	St. Louis		Binnington	18,096	36–30–3	75
70	March 21	St. Louis	5–2	Ottawa		Hofer	16,040	37–30–3	77
71	March 23	St. Louis	5–4	Minnesota	OT	Binnington	19,090	38–30–3	79
72	March 25	Vegas	2–1	St. Louis	OT	Binnington	18,096	38–30–4	80
73	March 28	Calgary	3–5	St. Louis		Binnington	18,096	39–30–4	82
74	March 30	San Jose	4–0	St. Louis		Hofer	18,096	39–31–4	82

April: 4–2–2 (home: 3–1–0; road: 1–1–2)
#	Date	Visitor	Score	Home	OT	Decision	Attendance	Record	Pts	Recap
75	April 1	Edmonton	2–3	St. Louis	OT	Binnington	18,096	40–31–4	84
76	April 4	St. Louis	3–6	Nashville		Binnington	17,420	40–32–4	84
77	April 6	St. Louis	2–3	San Jose	OT	Hofer	15,603	40–32–5	85
78	April 7	St. Louis	6–5	Anaheim	SO	Binnington	16,421	41–32–5	87
79	April 10	Chicago	2–5	St. Louis		Hofer	18,096	42–32–5	89
80	April 12	Carolina	5–2	St. Louis		Binnington	18,096	42–33–5	89
81	April 14	Seattle	1–4	St. Louis		Hofer	18,096	43–33–5	91
82	April 17	St. Louis	1–2	Dallas	SO	Binnington	18,532	43–33–6	92

Legend: Win (2 points) Loss (0 points) Overtime/shootout loss (1 point)

== Player statistics ==
Final stats

=== Skaters ===
Regular season
Player	GP	G	A	Pts	+/−	PIM
Robert Thomas	82	26	60	86	+9	48
Jordan Kyrou	82	31	36	67	−12	22
Pavel Buchnevich	80	27	36	63	+3	48
Brayden Schenn	82	20	26	46	−22	56
Brandon Saad	82	26	16	42	−4	20
Torey Krug	77	4	35	39	−31	32
Jake Neighbours	77	27	11	38	−16	21
Justin Faulk	60	2	28	30	−2	39
Kevin Hayes	79	13	16	29	0	12
Nick Leddy	82	3	25	28	+14	14
Colton Parayko	82	10	16	26	+4	23
Kasperi Kapanen	73	6	16	22	−5	14
Alexey Toropchenko	82	14	7	21	−3	30
Oskar Sundqvist	71	6	15	21	−6	32
Scott Perunovich	54	0	17	17	+1	12
Nathan Walker	45	7	6	13	−1	18
Zachary Bolduc	25	5	4	9	0	6
Marco Scandella	65	2	6	8	+2	15
Matthew Kessel	39	1	6	7	0	12
Samuel Blais	53	1	6	7	−11	31
Jakub Vrana	21	2	4	6	−7	8
Tyler Tucker	26	1	1	2	+1	42
Nikita Alexandrov	23	0	2	2	−4	4
Calle Rosen	6	0	1	1	−1	2
Mackenzie MacEachern	8	0	1	1	−1	0
Zach Dean	9	0	0	0	−4	6
Hugh McGing	5	0	0	0	−5	0
Adam Gaudette	2	0	0	0	0	4
Robert Bortuzzo^{‡}	4	0	0	0	+2	7

=== Goaltenders ===
Regular season
Player	GP	GS	TOI	W	L	OT	GA	GAA	SA	SV%	SO	G	A	PIM
Jordan Binnington	57	55	3,291:29	28	21	5	156	2.84	1,786	.913	3	0	3	8
Joel Hofer	30	27	1,628:39	15	12	1	72	2.65	830	.914	1	0	1	4

^{†}Denotes player spent time with another team before joining the Blues. Stats reflect time with the Blues only.
^{‡}Denotes player was traded mid-season. Stats reflect time with the Blues only.

== Transactions ==
The Blues have been involved in the following transactions during the 2023–24 season.

Key:

† Contract is entry-level.
‡ Contract initially takes effect in the 2024–25 season.

=== Trades ===
Date	Details		Ref
December 8, 2023	To New York Islanders Robert Bortuzzo	To St. Louis Blues 7th-round pick in 2024	
March 8, 2024	To Columbus Blue Jackets Malcolm Subban	To St. Louis Blues Future considerations	

=== Players acquired ===
Date	Player	Former team	Term	Via	Ref
July 1, 2023	Josh Jacobs	Colorado Avalanche	1-year	Free agency	
July 1, 2023	Wyatt Kalynuk	Vancouver Canucks	1-year	Free agency	
July 1, 2023	Mackenzie MacEachern	Carolina Hurricanes	2-year	Free agency	
July 1, 2023	Malcolm Subban	Buffalo Sabres	1-year	Free agency	
July 12, 2023	Oskar Sundqvist	Minnesota Wild	1-year	Free agency	
July 19, 2023	Jeremie Biakabutuka	Charlottetown Islanders (QMJHL)	3-year†	Free agency	

=== Players lost ===
Date	Player	New team	Term	Via	Ref
July 1, 2023	Logan Brown	Tampa Bay Lightning	1-year	Free agency	
July 1, 2023	Matthew Highmore	Ottawa Senators	1-year	Free agency	
July 1, 2023	Tyler Pitlick	New York Rangers	1-year	Free agency	
July 1, 2023	Steven Santini	Los Angeles Kings	1-year	Free agency	
July 3, 2023	Brady Lyle	Calgary Flames	1-year	Free agency	
July 3, 2023	Nathan Todd	San Jose Sharks	2-year	Free agency	
July 12, 2023	Thomas Greiss			Retirement	
July 31, 2023	Dmitri Samorukov	Wilkes-Barre/Scranton Penguins (AHL)	1-year	Free agency	

=== Signings ===
Date	Player	Term	Ref
June 30, 2023	Tyler Tucker	2-year	
July 5, 2023	Hugh McGing	1-year	
July 16, 2023	Alexey Toropchenko	2-year	
January 9, 2024	Nathan Walker	2-year‡	
March 7, 2024	Oskar Sundqvist	2-year	
March 13, 2024	Matthew Kessel	2-year	

== Draft Picks ==
Below are the St. Louis Blues' selections at the 2023 NHL entry draft, which was held on June 28 and 29, 2023, at Bridgestone Arena in Nashville.

Round	#	Player	Pos	Nationality	College/Junior/Club team (League)
1	10	Dalibor Dvorsky	C	Slovakia	AIK IF (HockeyAllsvenskan)
1	25	Otto Stenberg	C	Sweden	Frölunda HC (SHL)
1	29	Theo Lindstein	D	Sweden	Brynäs IF (SHL)
3	74	Quinton Burns	D	Canada	Kingston Frontenacs (OHL)
3	76	Juraj Pekarcik	LW	Slovakia	HK Nitra (Slovak Extraliga)
4	106	Jakub Stancl	C	Czechia	Växjö Lakers (J20 Nationell)
5	138	Paul Fischer	D	United States	Notre Dame Fighting Irish (B1G)
6	170	Matthew Mayich	D	Canada	Ottawa 67's (OHL)
7	202	Nikita Susuyev	RW	Russia	JHC Spartak (MHL)
