= 2023–24 Dallas Stars season =

National Hockey League season

2023–24 Dallas Stars
- Central Division champions
- Division: 1st Central
- Conference: 1st Western
- 2023–24 record: 52–21–9
- Home record: 26–11–4
- Road record: 26–10–5
- Goals for: 298
- Goals against: 234

Team information
- General manager: Jim Nill
- Coach: Peter DeBoer
- Captain: Jamie Benn
- Alternate captains: Miro Heiskanen; Esa Lindell; Joe Pavelski; Tyler Seguin
- Arena: American Airlines Center
- Average attendance: 18,532
- Minor league affiliates: Texas Stars (AHL); Idaho Steelheads (ECHL)

Team leaders
- Goals: Wyatt Johnston (32)
- Assists: Jason Robertson (51)
- Points: Jason Robertson (80)
- Penalty minutes: Mason Marchment (54)
- Plus/minus: Thomas Harley (+28)
- Wins: Jake Oettinger (35)
- Goals against average: Matt Murray (0.00)

The 2023–24 Dallas Stars season was the 57th season for the National Hockey League (NHL) franchise that was established on June 5, 1967, and the 31st season since the franchise relocated from Minnesota prior to the start of the 1993–94 season.

On March 28, 2024, the Stars clinched a playoff berth for the third straight season and fifth in the last six seasons after a 3–1 win over the Vancouver Canucks.

On April 13, the Stars clinched the Central Division title with a 3–1 win over the Seattle Kraken, and four days later, they clinched the best regular season record in the Western Conference, both of which for the first time since the 2015–16 season with a 2–1 shootout win over the St. Louis Blues. In the playoffs, the Stars overcame a 2–0 series deficit and eliminated the defending Stanley Cup champions Vegas Golden Knights in seven games in the first round, the Colorado Avalanche in six games in the second round, and lost to the Edmonton Oilers in six games in conference finals.

== Standings ==
=== Divisional standings ===
Central Division
Pos	Team	GP	W	L	OTL	RW	GF	GA	GD	Pts
1	z – Dallas Stars	82	52	21	9	40	298	234	+64	113
2	x – Winnipeg Jets	82	52	24	6	46	259	199	+60	110
3	x – Colorado Avalanche	82	50	25	7	42	304	254	+50	107
4	x – Nashville Predators	82	47	30	5	38	269	248	+21	99
5	St. Louis Blues	82	43	33	6	31	239	250	−11	92
6	Minnesota Wild	82	39	34	9	32	251	263	−12	87
7	Arizona Coyotes	82	36	41	5	28	256	274	−18	77
8	Chicago Blackhawks	82	23	53	6	17	179	290	−111	52

Source: National Hockey League
Rules for classification: 1) Fewer number of games played (GP, only during regular season); 2) Greater number of regulation wins (RW); 3) Greater number of wins in regulation and overtime, excluding shootout wins (ROW); 4) Greater number of total wins, including shootouts (W); 5) Greater number of points earned in head-to-head play; if teams played an uneven number of head-to-head games, the result of the first game on the home ice of the team with the extra home game is discarded; 6) Greater goal differential (GD); 7) Greater number of goals scored (GF)
x – Clinched playoff spot; z – Clinched conference

=== Conference standings ===
Western Conference Wild Card
Pos	Div	Team	GP	W	L	OTL	RW	GF	GA	GD	Pts
1	CE	x – Nashville Predators	82	47	30	5	38	269	248	+21	99
2	PA	x – Vegas Golden Knights	82	45	29	8	34	267	245	+22	98
3	CE	St. Louis Blues	82	43	33	6	31	239	250	−11	92
4	CE	Minnesota Wild	82	39	34	9	32	251	263	−12	87
5	PA	Calgary Flames	82	38	39	5	32	253	271	−18	81
6	PA	Seattle Kraken	82	34	35	13	28	217	236	−19	81
7	CE	Arizona Coyotes	82	36	41	5	28	256	274	−18	77
8	PA	Anaheim Ducks	82	27	50	5	21	204	295	−91	59
9	CE	Chicago Blackhawks	82	23	53	6	17	179	290	−111	52
10	PA	San Jose Sharks	82	19	54	9	14	181	331	−150	47

Source: National Hockey League
Rules for classification: 1) Fewer number of games played (GP, only during regular season); 2) Greater number of regulation wins (RW); 3) Greater number of wins in regulation and overtime, excluding shootout wins (ROW); 4) Greater number of total wins, including shootouts (W); 5) Greater number of points earned in head-to-head play; if teams played an uneven number of head-to-head games, the result of the first game on the home ice of the team with the extra home game is discarded; 6) Greater goal differential (GD); 7) Greater number of goals scored (GF)
x – Clinched playoff spot

== Schedule and results ==
=== Preseason ===
The Dallas Stars preseason schedule was released on June 23, 2023.

2023 preseason game log: 4–2–1 (Home: 3–1–0; Road: 1–1–1)

#	Date	Visitor	Score	Home	Decision	Location	Attendance	Record
1^{A}	September 24	Arizona	0–7	Dallas	Gibson	H-E-B Center at Cedar Park	—	1–0–0
2	September 26	Minnesota	1–6	Dallas	Wedgewood	American Airlines Center	14,114	2–0–0
3^{B}	September 30	Dallas	4–3 OT	St. Louis	Poirier	Cable Dahmer Arena	5,800	3–0–0
4	October 1	Dallas	3–4 OT	Colorado	Gibson	Ball Arena	15,207	3–0–1
5	October 3	Colorado	1–3	Dallas	Wedgewood	American Airlines Center	14,523	4–0–1
6	October 5	St. Louis	4–0	Dallas	Oettinger	American Airlines Center	15,365	4–1–1
7	October 7	Dallas	0–4	Minnesota	Oettinger	Xcel Energy Center	18,205	4–2–1

Legend: = Win = Loss = OT/SO Loss

^{A} – Game played in Cedar Park, TX ^{B} – Game played in Independence, MO

=== Regular season ===
The Dallas Stars regular season schedule was released on June 27, 2023.

2023–24 game log
October: 5–1–1 (Home: 3–1–0; Road: 2–0–1)

#	Date	Visitor	Score	Home	OT	Decision	Location	Attendance	Record	Points	Recap
1	October 12	St. Louis	1–2	Dallas	SO	Oettinger	American Airlines Center	18,532	1–0–0	2	
2	October 17	Dallas	2–3	Vegas	SO	Oettinger	T-Mobile Arena	17,612	1–0–1	3	
3	October 19	Dallas	3–2	Anaheim		Oettinger	Honda Center	14,274	2–0–1	5	
4	October 21	Philadelphia	4–5	Dallas	OT	Wedgewood	American Airlines Center	18,532	3–0–1	7	
5	October 24	Dallas	4–1	Pittsburgh		Oettinger	PPG Paints Arena	17,209	4–0–1	9	
6	October 26	Toronto	4–1	Dallas		Wedgewood	American Airlines Center	18,532	4–1–1	9	
7	October 30	Columbus	3–5	Dallas		Oettinger	American Airlines Center	18,532	5–1–1	11	

November: 8–4–2 (Home: 2–3–1; Road: 6–1–1)

#	Date	Visitor	Score	Home	OT	Decision	Location	Attendance	Record	Points	Recap
8	November 1	Dallas	4–3	Calgary		Oettinger	Scotiabank Saddledome	16,786	6–1–1	13	
9	November 2	Dallas	4–3	Edmonton		Wedgewood	Rogers Place	17,290	7–1–1	15	
10	November 4	Dallas	0–2	Vancouver		Oettinger	Rogers Arena	18,895	7–2–1	15	
11	November 6	Boston	3–2	Dallas		Oettinger	American Airlines Center	18,532	7–3–1	15	
12	November 9	Dallas	5–2	Columbus		Oettinger	Nationwide Arena	15,253	8–3–1	17	
13	November 11	Dallas	3–2	Winnipeg		Wedgewood	Canada Life Centre	12,420	9–3–1	19	
14	November 12	Dallas	8–3	Minnesota		Oettinger	Xcel Energy Center	18,509	10–3–1	21	
15	November 14	Arizona	3–4	Dallas	OT	Oettinger	American Airlines Center	18,532	11–3–1	23	
16	November 18	Colorado	6–3	Dallas		Oettinger	American Airlines Center	18,532	11–4–1	23	
17	November 20	NY Rangers	3–6	Dallas		Wedgewood	American Airlines Center	18,532	12–4–1	25	
18	November 22	Vegas	2–1	Dallas	OT	Oettinger	American Airlines Center	18,532	12–4–2	26	
19	November 24	Calgary	7–4	Dallas		Oettinger	American Airlines Center	18,532	12–5–2	26	
20	November 28	Dallas	2–0	Winnipeg		Oettinger	Canada Life Centre	11,439	13–5–2	28	
21	November 30	Dallas	3–4	Calgary	OT	Wedgewood	Scotiabank Saddledome	16,941	13–5–3	29	

December: 9–4–1 (Home: 7–1–0; Road: 2–3–1)

#	Date	Visitor	Score	Home	Location	OT	Decision	Attendance	Record	Points	Recap
22	December 2	Tampa Bay	1–8	Dallas	American Airlines Center		Oettinger	18,532	14–5–3	31	
23	December 4	Dallas	0–4	Tampa Bay	Amalie Arena		Oettinger	19,092	14–6–3	31	
24	December 6	Dallas	4–5	Florida	Amerant Bank Arena		Oettinger	18,376	14–7–3	31	
25	December 7	Dallas	5–4	Washington	Capital One Arena	SO	Wedgewood	15,850	15–7–3	33	
26	December 9	Vegas	6–1	Dallas	American Airlines Center		Oettinger	18,532	15–8–3	33	
27	December 11	Detroit	3–6	Dallas	American Airlines Center		Oettinger	18,532	16–8–3	35	
28	December 15	Ottawa	4–5	Dallas	American Airlines Center		Wedgewood	18,532	17–8–3	37	
29	December 16	Dallas	3–4	St. Louis	Enterprise Center	OT	Wedgewood	18,096	17–8–4	38	
30	December 18	Seattle	3–4	Dallas	American Airlines Center	OT	Wedgewood	18,532	18–8–4	40	
31	December 21	Vancouver	3–4	Dallas	American Airlines Center	OT	Wedgewood	18,532	19–8–4	42	
32	December 23	Dallas	3–2	Nashville	Bridgestone Arena		Wedgewood	17,159	20–8–4	44	
33	December 27	Dallas	1–2	St. Louis	Enterprise Center		Wedgewood	18,096	20–9–4	44	
34	December 29	Chicago	4–5	Dallas	American Airlines Center	OT	Wedgewood	18,532	21–9–4	46	
35	December 31	Chicago	1–8	Dallas	American Airlines Center		Wedgewood	18,532	22–9–4	48	

January: 8–4–2 (Home: 4–3–1; Road: 4–1–1)

#	Date	Visitor	Score	Home	Location	OT	Decision	Attendance	Record	Points	Recap
36	January 2	Montreal	4–3	Dallas	American Airlines Center		Wedgewood	18,532	22–10–4	48	
37	January 4	Colorado	5–4	Dallas	American Airlines Center	OT	Wedgewood	18,532	22–10–5	49	
38	January 6	Nashville	4–3	Dallas	American Airlines Center		Wedgewood	18,532	22–11–5	49	
39	January 8	Dallas	4–0	Minnesota	Xcel Energy Center		Murray	18,087	23–11–5	51	
40	January 10	Minnesota	2–7	Dallas	American Airlines Center		Wedgewood	18,532	24–11–5	53	
41	January 12	Nashville	6–3	Dallas	American Airlines Center		Oettinger	18,532	24–12–5	53	
42	January 13	Dallas	3–1	Chicago	United Center		Oettinger	18,889	25–12–5	55	
43	January 16	Los Angeles	1–5	Dallas	American Airlines Center		Oettinger	18,532	26–12–5	57	
44	January 18	Dallas	1–5	Philadelphia	Wells Fargo Center		Oettinger	18,024	26–13–5	57	
45	January 20	Dallas	6–2	New Jersey	Prudential Center		Wedgewood	16,514	27–13–5	59	
46	January 21	Dallas	2–3	NY Islanders	UBS Arena	OT	Wedgewood	17,255	27–13–6	60	
47	January 23	Dallas	5–4	Detroit	Little Caesars Arena		Oettinger	18,923	28–13–6	62	
48	January 25	Anaheim	3–4	Dallas	American Airlines Center	OT	Oettinger	18,532	29–13–6	64	
49	January 27	Washington	4–5	Dallas	American Airlines Center	OT	Oettinger	18,532	30–13–6	66	

February: 6–4–3 (Home: 2–0–2; Road: 4–4–1)

#	Date	Visitor	Score	Home	Location	OT	Decision	Attendance	Record	Points	Recap
50	February 6	Dallas	2–1	Buffalo	KeyBank Center		Oettinger	13,221	31–13–6	68	
51	February 7	Dallas	4–5	Toronto	Scotiabank Arena		Wedgewood	18,517	31–14–6	68	
52	February 10	Dallas	3–2	Montreal	Bell Centre		Oettinger	21,105	32–14–6	70	
53	February 13	Carolina	2–4	Dallas	American Airlines Center		Oettinger	18,532	33–14–6	72	
54	February 15	Dallas	9–2	Nashville	Bridgestone Arena		Oettinger	17,159	34–14–6	74	
55	February 17	Edmonton	4–3	Dallas	American Airlines Center	OT	Oettinger	18,532	34–14–7	75	
56	February 19	Dallas	3–4	Boston	TD Garden	SO	Oettinger	17,850	34–14–8	76	
57	February 20	Dallas	1–3	NY Rangers	Madison Square Garden		Wedgewood	18,006	34–15–8	76	
58	February 22	Dallas	1–4	Ottawa	Canadian Tire Centre		Oettinger	16,118	34–16–8	76	
59	February 24	Dallas	2–1	Carolina	PNC Arena		Oettinger	18,952	35–16–8	78	
60	February 26	NY Islanders	3–2	Dallas	American Airlines Center	OT	Wedgewood	18,532	35–16–9	79	
61	February 27	Dallas	1–5	Colorado	Ball Arena		Oettinger	18,117	35–17–9	79	
62	February 29	Winnipeg	1–4	Dallas	American Airlines Center		Oettinger	18,532	36–17–9	81	

March: 11–2–0 (Home: 4–2–0; Road: 7–0–0)

#	Date	Visitor	Score	Home	Location	OT	Decision	Attendance	Record	Points	Recap
63	March 2	San Jose	2–3	Dallas	American Airlines Center	SO	Oettinger	18,532	37–17–9	83	
64	March 5	Dallas	7–6	San Jose	SAP Center	OT	Oettinger	10,070	38–17–9	85	
65	March 8	Dallas	6–2	Anaheim	Honda Center		Oettinger	16,000	39–17–9	87	
66	March 9	Dallas	4–1	Los Angeles	Crypto.com Arena		Wedgewood	18,145	40–17–9	89	
67	March 12	Florida	4–3	Dallas	American Airlines Center		Oettinger	18,532	40–18–9	89	
68	March 14	New Jersey	6–2	Dallas	American Airlines Center		Wedgewood	18,532	40–19–9	89	
69	March 16	Los Angeles	1–4	Dallas	American Airlines Center		Wedgewood	18,532	41–19–9	91	
70	March 20	Arizona	2–5	Dallas	American Airlines Center		Oettinger	18,532	42–19–9	93	
71	March 22	Pittsburgh	2–4	Dallas	American Airlines Center		Oettinger	18,532	43–19–9	95	
72	March 24	Dallas	4–2	Arizona	Mullett Arena		Oettinger	4,600	44–19–9	97	
73	March 26	Dallas	6–3	San Jose	SAP Center		Wedgewood	12,208	45–19–9	99	
74	March 28	Dallas	3–1	Vancouver	Rogers Arena		Oettinger	18,987	46–19–9	101	
75	March 30	Dallas	3–0	Seattle	Climate Pledge Arena		Oettinger	17,151	47–19–9	103	

April: 5–2–0 (Home: 4–1–0; Road: 1–1–0)

#	Date	Visitor	Score	Home	Location	OT	Decision	Attendance	Record	Points	Recap
76	April 3	Edmonton	0–5	Dallas	American Airlines Center		Oettinger	18,532	48–19–9	105	
77	April 6	Dallas	2–3	Chicago	United Center		Wedgewood	19,294	48–20–9	105	
78	April 7	Dallas	7–4	Colorado	Ball Arena		Oettinger	18,116	49–20–9	107	
79	April 9	Buffalo	2–3	Dallas	American Airlines Center		Oettinger	18,532	50–20–9	109	
80	April 11	Winnipeg	3–0	Dallas	American Airlines Center		Oettinger	18,532	50–21–9	109	
81	April 13	Seattle	1–3	Dallas	American Airlines Center		Oettinger	18,532	51–21–9	111	
82	April 17	St. Louis	1–2	Dallas	American Airlines Center	SO	Oettinger	18,532	52–21–9	113	

Win (2 points) Loss (0 points) Overtime/shootout loss (1 point)

=== Playoffs ===
2024 Stanley Cup playoffs
Western Conference first round vs. (WC2) Vegas Golden Knights: Dallas won 4–3

#	Date	Visitor	Score	Home	OT	Decision	Attendance	Series	Recap
1	April 22	Vegas	4–3	Dallas		Oettinger	18,532	0–1	
2	April 24	Vegas	3–1	Dallas		Oettinger	18,532	0–2	
3	April 27	Dallas	3–2	Vegas	OT	Oettinger	18,536	1–2	
4	April 29	Dallas	4–2	Vegas		Oettinger	18,333	2–2	
5	May 1	Vegas	2–3	Dallas		Oettinger	18,532	3–2	
6	May 3	Dallas	0–2	Vegas		Oettinger	18,432	3–3	
7	May 5	Vegas	1–2	Dallas		Oettinger	19,046	4–3	

Western Conference second round vs. (C3) Colorado Avalanche: Dallas won 4–2

#	Date	Visitor	Score	Home	OT	Decision	Attendance	Series	Recap
1	May 7	Colorado	4–3	Dallas	OT	Oettinger	18,532	0–1	
2	May 9	Colorado	3–5	Dallas		Oettinger	18,532	1–1	
3	May 11	Dallas	4–1	Colorado		Oettinger	18,131	2–1	
4	May 13	Dallas	5–1	Colorado		Oettinger	18,123	3–1	
5	May 15	Colorado	5–3	Dallas		Oettinger	18,532	3–2	
6	May 17	Dallas	2–1	Colorado	2OT	Oettinger	18,126	4–2	

Western Conference final vs. (P2) Edmonton Oilers: Edmonton won 4–2

#	Date	Visitor	Score	Home	OT	Decision	Attendance	Series	Recap
1	May 23	Edmonton	3–2	Dallas	2OT	Oettinger	18,532	0–1	
2	May 25	Edmonton	1–3	Dallas		Oettinger	18,532	1–1	
3	May 27	Dallas	5–3	Edmonton		Oettinger	18,347	2–1	
4	May 29	Dallas	2–5	Edmonton		Oettinger	18,347	2–2	
5	May 31	Edmonton	3–1	Dallas		Oettinger	18,532	2–3	
6	June 2	Dallas	1–2	Edmonton		Oettinger	18,347	2–4	

Legend: Win Loss

== Player statistics ==
Updated as of June 2, 2024

=== Skaters ===
Regular season
Player	GP	G	A	Pts	+/–	PIM
Jason Robertson	82	29	51	80	+19	22
Joe Pavelski	82	27	40	67	+12	20
Wyatt Johnston	82	32	33	65	+14	38
Roope Hintz	80	30	35	65	+26	22
Matt Duchene	80	25	40	65	+15	20
Jamie Benn	82	21	39	60	+8	41
Miro Heiskanen	71	9	45	54	+8	36
Mason Marchment	81	22	31	53	+22	54
Tyler Seguin	68	25	27	52	+10	26
Thomas Harley	79	15	32	47	+28	18
Esa Lindell	82	5	21	26	+17	12
Sam Steel	77	9	15	24	0	29
Evgenii Dadonov	51	12	11	23	−6	8
Craig Smith	75	11	9	20	+2	33
Radek Faksa	74	7	12	19	0	20
Nils Lundkvist	59	2	17	19	+13	16
Ryan Suter	82	2	15	17	+14	28
Logan Stankoven	24	6	8	14	+10	4
Jani Hakanpaa	64	2	10	12	+10	33
Ty Dellandrea	42	2	7	9	–10	23
Christopher Tanev^{†}	19	1	4	5	+6	10
Joel Hanley^{‡}	32	0	3	3	+3	23
Mavrik Bourque	1	0	0	0	0	0
Derrick Pouliot	5	0	0	0	–1	0
Alex Petrovic	1	0	0	0	–1	0

Playoffs
Player	GP	G	A	Pts	+/–	PIM
Wyatt Johnston	19	10	6	16	+4	2
Miro Heiskanen	19	6	10	16	0	8
Jason Robertson	19	6	10	16	–2	0
Jamie Benn	19	4	11	15	+5	6
Tyler Seguin	19	5	8	13	+9	2
Logan Stankoven	19	3	5	8	+6	2
Roope Hintz	15	2	6	8	0	6
Evgenii Dadonov	19	3	4	7	0	2
Matt Duchene	19	2	4	6	0	6
Mason Marchment	13	3	2	5	–3	10
Esa Lindell	19	3	2	5	+2	4
Sam Steel	19	1	4	5	+1	2
Joe Pavelski	19	1	3	4	–5	2
Ryan Suter	19	1	3	4	+1	16
Thomas Harley	19	0	4	4	+8	0
Christopher Tanev	19	0	2	2	+7	6
Craig Smith	14	0	2	2	–2	2
Ty Dellandrea	6	1	0	1	0	2
Radek Faksa	8	1	0	1	–1	2
Nils Lundkvist	12	0	1	1	0	2
Mavrik Bourque	1	0	0	0	0	0
Alex Petrovic	7	0	0	0	+1	2

=== Goaltenders ===
Regular season
Player	GP	GS	TOI	W	L	OT	GA	GAA	SA	SV%	SO	G	A	PIM
Jake Oettinger	54	53	3,084:35	35	14	4	140	2.72	1,476	.905	3	0	0	2
Scott Wedgewood	32	28	1,789:08	16	7	5	85	2.85	844	.899	0	0	0	0
Matt Murray	1	1	60:00	1	0	0	0	0.00	23	1.000	1	0	0	0

Playoffs
Player	GP	GS	TOI	W	L	GA	GAA	SA	SV%	SO	G	A	PIM
Jake Oettinger	19	19	1,206:47	10	9	45	2.24	516	.915	0	0	1	2

^{†}Denotes player spent time with another team before joining the Stars. Stats reflect time with the Stars only.
^{‡}Denotes player was traded mid-season. Stats reflect time with the Stars only.
Bold/italics denotes franchise record.

== Transactions ==
The Stars have been involved in the following transactions during the 2023–24 season.

Key:

† Contract is entry-level.
‡ Contract initially takes effect in the 2024–25 season.

=== Trades ===
Date	Details		Ref
June 29, 2023	To Nashville Predators 3rd-round pick in 2024; 6th-round pick in 2024	To Dallas Stars 3rd-round pick in 2023	
July 1, 2023	To New Jersey Devils Colin Miller	To Dallas Stars 5th-round pick in 2025	
March 7, 2024	To Calgary Flames Riley Damiani	To Dallas Stars Mathias Emilio Pettersen	
June 19, 2024	To San Jose Sharks Ty Dellandrea	To Dallas Stars WPG 4th-round pick in 2025	

=== Players acquired ===
Date	Player	Former team	Term	Via	Ref
July 1, 2023	Matt Duchene	Nashville Predators	1-year	Free agency	
July 1, 2023	Craig Smith	Washington Capitals	1-year	Free agency	
July 1, 2023	Sam Steel	Minnesota Wild	1-year	Free agency	
July 2, 2023	Gavin Bayreuther	Columbus Blue Jackets	1-year	Free agency	
July 4, 2023	Derrick Pouliot	San Jose Sharks	1-year	Free agency	

=== Players lost ===
Date	Player	New team	Term	Via	Ref
July 1, 2023	Rhett Gardner	Philadelphia Flyers	2-year	Free agency	
July 1, 2023	Luke Glendening	Tampa Bay Lightning	2-year	Free agency	
July 1, 2023	Ryan Shea	Pittsburgh Penguins	1-year	Free agency	
July 1, 2023	Marian Studenic	Seattle Kraken	1-year	Free agency	
July 2, 2023	Ben Gleason	Edmonton Oilers	2-year	Free agency	
July 2, 2023	Riley Tufte	Colorado Avalanche	1-year	Free agency	
July 3, 2023	Max Domi	Toronto Maple Leafs	1-year	Free agency	
July 4, 2023	Will Butcher	Pittsburgh Penguins	1-year	Free agency	
July 10, 2023	Adam Scheel	Chicago Wolves (AHL)	1-year	Free agency	
July 18, 2023	Dawson Barteaux	Manitoba Moose (AHL)	1-year	Free agency	
July 18, 2023	Tanner Kero	Colorado Eagles (AHL)	1-year	Free agency	
August 3, 2023	Riley Barber	Barys Astana (KHL)	1-year	Free agency	
October 11, 2023	Joel Kiviranta	Colorado Eagles (AHL)	1-year	Free agency	
October 18, 2023	Dylan Wells	Idaho Steelheads (ECHL)	1-year	Free agency	

=== Signings ===
Date	Player	Term	Ref
June 30, 2023	Jerad Rosburg	1-year	
July 1, 2023	Joel Hanley	2-year	
July 3, 2023	Nick Caamano	1-year	
July 3, 2023	Scott Reedy	1-year	
July 13, 2023	Ty Dellandrea	1-year	
July 14, 2023	Riley Damiani	1-year	
March 7, 2024	Connor Punnett	3-year†‡	
March 11, 2024	Justin Ertel	3-year†‡	
March 15, 2024	Tristan Bertucci	3-year†‡	
March 18, 2024	Luke Krys	2-year†‡	
March 20, 2024	Justin Hryckowian	2-year†‡	
March 25, 2024	Ben Kraws	1-year†‡	

== Draft picks ==
Below are the Dallas Stars' selections at the 2023 NHL entry draft, which was held on June 28 and 29, 2023, in Nashville, Tennessee.

Round	#	Player	Pos	Nationality	College/Junior/Club (League)
2	61	Tristan Bertucci	D	Canada	Flint Firebirds (OHL)
3	79	Brad Gardiner	C	Canada	Ottawa 67's (OHL)
4	125	Aram Minnetian	D	United States	U.S. NTDP (USHL)
5	157	Arno Tiefensee	G	Germany	Adler Mannheim (DEL)
6	189	Angus MacDonell	C	Canada	Mississauga Steelheads (OHL)
7	221	Sebastian Bradshaw	LW	Canada	Elite Hockey Academy (18U AAA)
