= 2023–24 Buffalo Sabres season =

National Hockey League season

2023–24 Buffalo Sabres
- Division: 6th Atlantic
- Conference: 12th Eastern
- 2023–24 record: 39–37–6
- Home record: 21–19–1
- Road record: 18–18–5
- Goals for: 246
- Goals against: 244

Team information
- General manager: Kevyn Adams
- Coach: Don Granato
- Captain: Kyle Okposo (Oct. 12 – Mar. 8); Vacant (Mar. 8 – Apr. 15)
- Alternate captains: Rasmus Dahlin; Zemgus Girgensons; Rotating (Mar. 8 – Apr. 15)
- Arena: KeyBank Center
- Average attendance: 15,981
- Minor league affiliates: Rochester Americans (AHL); Jacksonville Icemen (ECHL)

Team leaders
- Goals: Tage Thompson (29)
- Assists: Rasmus Dahlin (39)
- Points: Rasmus Dahlin; Alex Tuch (59)
- Penalty minutes: Connor Clifton (88)
- Plus/minus: Henri Jokiharju (+14)
- Wins: Ukko-Pekka Luukkonen (27)
- Goals against average: Ukko-Pekka Luukkonen (2.57)

The 2023–24 Buffalo Sabres season was the 54th season of play for the Sabres in the National Hockey League (NHL).

The Sabres failed to improve on a strong 2022–23 season (42–33–7; 91 points). After the 2022 Seattle Mariners of Major League Baseball (MLB) clinched a playoff spot for the first time since 2001 and the 2022–23 Sacramento Kings of National Basketball Association (NBA) clinched a playoff spot for the first time since 2006, the Sabres and New York Jets of the National Football League (NFL) are tied for the longest active playoff drought in American sports, missing them for 12 consecutive years. They attempted to return to the playoffs for the first time since 2011 (the current longest, and the longest playoff drought in NHL history and professional sports only behind the New York Jets who also missed the playoffs), but were eliminated from playoff contention for the 13th consecutive season after a 3–2 loss to the Dallas Stars on April 9, 2024.

== Standings ==
=== Divisional standings ===
Atlantic Division
Pos	Team	GP	W	L	OTL	RW	GF	GA	GD	Pts
1	y – Florida Panthers	82	52	24	6	42	268	200	+68	110
2	x – Boston Bruins	82	47	20	15	36	267	224	+43	109
3	x – Toronto Maple Leafs	82	46	26	10	33	303	263	+40	102
4	x – Tampa Bay Lightning	82	45	29	8	37	291	268	+23	98
5	Detroit Red Wings	82	41	32	9	27	278	274	+4	91
6	Buffalo Sabres	82	39	37	6	33	246	244	+2	84
7	Ottawa Senators	82	37	41	4	25	255	281	−26	78
8	Montreal Canadiens	82	30	36	16	20	236	289	−53	76

Source: National Hockey League
Rules for classification: 1) Fewer number of games played (GP, only during regular season); 2) Greater number of regulation wins (RW); 3) Greater number of wins in regulation and overtime, excluding shootout wins (ROW); 4) Greater number of total wins, including shootouts (W); 5) Greater number of points earned in head-to-head play; if teams played an uneven number of head-to-head games, the result of the first game on the home ice of the team with the extra home game is discarded; 6) Greater goal differential (GD); 7) Greater number of goals scored (GF)
x – Clinched playoff spot; y – Clinched division

=== Conference standings ===
Eastern Conference Wild Card
Pos	Div	Team	GP	W	L	OTL	RW	GF	GA	GD	Pts
1	AT	x – Tampa Bay Lightning	82	45	29	8	37	291	268	+23	98
2	ME	x – Washington Capitals	82	40	31	11	32	220	257	−37	91
3	AT	Detroit Red Wings	82	41	32	9	27	278	274	+4	91
4	ME	Pittsburgh Penguins	82	38	32	12	32	255	251	+4	88
5	ME	Philadelphia Flyers	82	38	33	11	30	235	261	−26	87
6	AT	Buffalo Sabres	82	39	37	6	33	246	244	+2	84
7	ME	New Jersey Devils	82	38	39	5	33	264	283	−19	81
8	AT	Ottawa Senators	82	37	41	4	25	255	281	−26	78
9	AT	Montreal Canadiens	82	30	36	16	20	236	289	−53	76
10	ME	Columbus Blue Jackets	82	27	43	12	21	237	300	−63	66

Source: National Hockey League
Rules for classification: 1) Fewer number of games played (GP, only during regular season); 2) Greater number of regulation wins (RW); 3) Greater number of wins in regulation and overtime, excluding shootout wins (ROW); 4) Greater number of total wins, including shootouts (W); 5) Greater number of points earned in head-to-head play; if teams played an uneven number of head-to-head games, the result of the first game on the home ice of the team with the extra home game is discarded; 6) Greater goal differential (GD); 7) Greater number of goals scored (GF)
x – Clinched playoff spot

== Schedule and results ==
=== Preseason ===
The preseason schedule was published on June 21, 2023.

2023 preseason game log: 3–4–0 (Home: 2–1–0; Road: 1–3–0)
#	Date	Visitor	Score	Home	OT	Decision	Attendance	Record	Recap
1	September 24	Buffalo	4–3	Washington	SO	Tokarski	12,638	1–0–0
2	September 26	Boston	1–4	Buffalo		Levi	11,153	2–0–0
3	September 27	Buffalo	2–5	Toronto		Luukkonen	3,000	2–1–0
4	September 28	Buffalo	1–3	Pittsburgh		Comrie	13,939	2–2–0
5	September 30	Columbus	3–4	Buffalo		Levi	12,209	3–2–0
6	October 4	Buffalo	3–5	Columbus		Luukkonen	10,169	3–3–0
7	October 6	Pittsburgh	7–4	Buffalo		Levi	14,875	3–4–0

=== Regular season ===
The regular season schedule was published on June 27, 2023.

2023–24 game log

October: 4–5–0 (Home: 3–3–0; Road: 1–2–0)
#	Date	Visitor	Score	Home	OT	Decision	Attendance	Record	Pts	Recap
1	October 12	NY Rangers	5–1	Buffalo		Levi	19,070	0–1–0	0
2	October 14	Buffalo	2–3	NY Islanders		Levi	17,255	0–2–0	0
3	October 17	Tampa Bay	2–3	Buffalo	OT	Levi	12,598	1–2–0	2
4	October 19	Calgary	4–3	Buffalo		Levi	13,025	1–3–0	2
5	October 21	NY Islanders	1–3	Buffalo		Comrie	16,179	2–3–0	4
6	October 23	Montreal	3–1	Buffalo		Comrie	13,507	2–4–0	4
7	October 24	Buffalo	6–4	Ottawa		Luukkonen	14,278	3–4–0	6
8	October 27	Buffalo	4–5	New Jersey		Luukkonen	16,514	3–5–0	6
9	October 29	Colorado	0–4	Buffalo		Luukkonen	15,717	4–5–0	8

November: 6–6–2 (home: 2–2–0; road: 4–4–2)
#	Date	Visitor	Score	Home	OT	Decision	Attendance	Record	Pts	Recap
10	November 1	Buffalo	5–2	Philadelphia		Luukkonen	17,279	5–5–0	10
11	November 3	Philadelphia	5–1	Buffalo		Luukkonen	16,612	5–6–0	10
12	November 4	Buffalo	6–4	Toronto		Levi	18,902	6–6–0	12
13	November 7	Buffalo	2–3	Carolina	OT	Luukkonen	18,700	6–6–1	13
14	November 10	Minnesota	2–3	Buffalo		Levi	17,031	7–6–1	15
15	November 11	Buffalo	0–4	Pittsburgh		Luukkonen	18,429	7–7–1	15
16	November 14	Boston	5–2	Buffalo		Levi	14,840	7–8–1	15
17	November 17	Buffalo	2–3	Winnipeg		Comrie	11,340	7–9–1	15
18	November 19	Buffalo	3–2	Chicago		Luukkonen	19,027	8–9–1	17
19	November 22	Buffalo	3–4	Washington	OT	Levi	18,573	8–9–2	18
20	November 24	Pittsburgh	2–3	Buffalo		Luukkonen	19,070	9–9–2	20
21	November 25	Buffalo	2–7	New Jersey		Comrie	16,514	9–10–2	20
22	November 27	Buffalo	5–1	NY Rangers		Luukkonen	18,006	10–10–2	22
23	November 30	Buffalo	4–6	St. Louis		Luukkonen	18,096	10–11–2	22

December: 5–8–2 (home: 3–4–1; road: 2–4–1)
#	Date	Visitor	Score	Home	OT	Decision	Attendance	Record	Pts	Recap
24	December 2	Buffalo	2–6	Carolina		Comrie	18,797	10–12–2	22
25	December 3	Nashville	2–1	Buffalo		Luukkonen	14,644	10–13–2	22
26	December 5	Detroit	5–3	Buffalo		Comrie	14,800	10–14–2	22
27	December 7	Buffalo	3–1	Boston		Levi	17,850	11–14–2	24
28	December 9	Montreal	3–2	Buffalo	SO	Levi	17,123	11–14–3	25
29	December 11	Arizona	2–5	Buffalo		Levi	14,083	12–14–3	27
30	December 13	Buffalo	1–5	Colorado		Luukkonen	18,034	12–15–3	27
31	December 15	Buffalo	5–2	Vegas		Levi	18,008	13–15–3	29
32	December 16	Buffalo	0–2	Arizona		Luukkonen	4,600	13–16–3	29
33	December 19	Columbus	9–4	Buffalo		Luukkonen	14,888	13–17–3	29
34	December 21	Toronto	3–9	Buffalo		Levi	19,070	14–17–3	31
35	December 23	Buffalo	3–4	NY Rangers	OT	Luukkonen	18,006	14–17–4	32
36	December 27	Boston	4–1	Buffalo		Levi	19,070	14–18–4	32
37	December 30	Columbus	2–3	Buffalo	OT	Luukkonen	19,070	15–18–4	34
38	December 31	Buffalo	1–5	Ottawa		Levi	19,421	15–19–4	34

January: 7–4–0 (home: 3–3–0; road: 4–1–0)
#	Date	Visitor	Score	Home	OT	Decision	Attendance	Record	Pts	Recap
39	January 4	Buffalo	6–1	Montreal		Levi	21,105	16–19–4	36
40	January 6	Buffalo	3–1	Pittsburgh		Luukkonen	18,256	17–19–4	38
41	January 9	Seattle	5–2	Buffalo		Levi	14,628	17–20–4	38
42	January 11	Ottawa	3–5	Buffalo		Luukkonen	16,083	18–20–4	40
43	January 13	Vancouver	1–0	Buffalo		Luukkonen	17,662	18–21–4	40
44	January 15	San Jose	0–3	Buffalo		Luukkonen	16,186	19–21–4	42
—	January 17	Chicago	—	Buffalo	Postponed due to travel restrictions in Buffalo; moved to January 18. The game was flexed out of TNT's first game and was replaced with Red Wings-Panthers. The game aired on MSG Western New York on the rescheduled date.
45	January 18	Chicago	0–3	Buffalo		Luukkonen	15,465	20–21–4	44
46	January 20	Tampa Bay	3–1	Buffalo		Luukkonen	18,246	20–22–4	44
47	January 23	Buffalo	2–4	Anaheim		Luukkonen	16,302	20–23–4	44
48	January 24	Buffalo	5–3	Los Angeles		Levi	18,145	21–23–4	46
49	January 27	Buffalo	5–2	San Jose		Luukkonen	17,435	22–23–4	48

February: 6–5–0 (home: 2–4–0; road: 4–1–0)
#	Date	Visitor	Score	Home	OT	Decision	Attendance	Record	Pts	Recap
50	February 6	Dallas	2–1	Buffalo		Luukkonen	13,221	22–24–4	48
51	February 10	St. Louis	3–1	Buffalo		Luukkonen	16,726	22–25–4	48
52	February 13	Los Angeles	0–7	Buffalo		Luukkonen	13,292	23–25–4	50
53	February 15	Florida	4–0	Buffalo		Comrie	14,277	23–26–4	50
54	February 17	Buffalo	3–2	Minnesota	OT	Luukkonen	19,276	24–26–4	52
55	February 19	Anaheim	4–3	Buffalo		Luukkonen	17,229	24–27–4	52
56	February 21	Buffalo	3–2	Montreal		Luukkonen	21,105	25–27–4	54
57	February 23	Buffalo	2–1	Columbus		Luukkonen	18,943	26–27–4	56
58	February 25	Carolina	2–3	Buffalo	SO	Luukkonen	15,690	27–27–4	58
59	February 27	Buffalo	2–3	Florida		Luukkonen	18,243	27–28–4	58
60	February 29	Buffalo	3–2	Tampa Bay	OT	Luukkonen	19,092	28–28–4	60

March: 7–7–1 (home: 5–3–0; road: 2–4–1)
#	Date	Visitor	Score	Home	OT	Decision	Attendance	Record	Pts	Recap
61	March 2	Vegas	2–7	Buffalo		Luukkonen	16,693	29–28–4	62
62	March 3	Winnipeg	5–2	Buffalo		Luukkonen	14,171	29–29–4	62
63	March 6	Buffalo	1–2	Toronto	OT	Luukkonen	18,624	29–29–5	63
64	March 7	Buffalo	2–4	Nashville		Comrie	17,159	29–30–5	63
65	March 9	Edmonton	2–3	Buffalo	SO	Luukkonen	19,070	30–30–5	65
66	March 12	Detroit	3–7	Buffalo		Luukkonen	15,529	31–30–5	67
67	March 14	NY Islanders	0–4	Buffalo		Luukkonen	15,637	32–30–5	69
68	March 16	Buffalo	1–4	Detroit		Luukkonen	19,515	32–31–5	69
69	March 18	Buffalo	6–2	Seattle		Luukkonen	17,151	33–31–5	71
70	March 19	Buffalo	2–3	Vancouver		Levi	18,733	33–32–5	71
71	March 21	Buffalo	3–8	Edmonton		Luukkonen	18,347	33–33–5	71
72	March 24	Buffalo	4–1	Calgary		Luukkonen	16,497	34–33–5	73
73	March 27	Ottawa	6–2	Buffalo		Luukkonen	14,583	34–34–5	73
74	March 29	New Jersey	2–5	Buffalo		Levi	15,721	35–34–5	75
75	March 30	Toronto	3–0	Buffalo		Luukkonen	19,070	35–35–5	75

April: 4–2–1 (home: 3–0–0; road: 1–2–1)
#	Date	Visitor	Score	Home	OT	Decision	Attendance	Record	Pts	Recap
76	April 2	Washington	2–6	Buffalo		Luukkonen	14,390	36–35–5	77
77	April 5	Philadelphia	2–4	Buffalo		Luukkonen	15,783	37–35–5	79
78	April 7	Buffalo	1–3	Detroit		Luukkonen	19,515	37–36–5	79
79	April 9	Buffalo	2–3	Dallas		Luukkonen	18,532	37–37–5	79
80	April 11	Washington	2–4	Buffalo		Luukkonen	15,454	38–37–5	81
81	April 13	Buffalo	2–3	Florida	OT	Luukkonen	19,319	38–37–6	82
82	April 15	Buffalo	4–2	Tampa Bay		Comrie	19,092	39–37–6	84

Legend: Win (2 points) Loss (0 points) Overtime/shootout loss (1 point)

== Player statistics ==
=== Skaters ===
Regular season
Player	GP	G	A	Pts	+/−	PIM
Alex Tuch	75	22	37	59	+9	54
Rasmus Dahlin	81	20	39	59	−3	66
Tage Thompson	71	29	27	56	−1	43
JJ Peterka	82	28	22	50	+10	28
Dylan Cozens	79	18	29	47	−4	42
Casey Mittelstadt^{‡}	62	14	33	47	+12	28
Jeff Skinner	74	24	22	46	−2	34
Owen Power	76	6	27	33	+8	28
Zach Benson	71	11	19	30	−3	36
Jordan Greenway	67	10	18	28	+11	64
Kyle Okposo^{‡}	61	12	10	22	+1	32
Henri Jokiharju	74	3	17	20	+14	24
Jack Quinn	27	9	10	19	−1	8
Connor Clifton	79	4	14	18	+12	88
Peyton Krebs	80	4	13	17	+2	67
Victor Olofsson	51	7	8	15	−1	4
Zemgus Girgensons	63	8	6	14	−1	21
Bowen Byram^{†}	18	3	6	9	−1	13
Eric Robinson^{†}	40	2	7	9	0	19
Jacob Bryson	36	1	7	8	+5	8
Mattias Samuelsson	41	1	6	7	+4	26
Ryan Johnson	41	0	7	7	+3	12
Tyson Jost	43	3	3	6	−11	10
Erik Johnson^{‡}	50	3	0	3	−5	24
Brandon Biro	5	2	0	2	0	0
Lukas Rousek	15	0	2	2	−1	0
Kale Clague	3	0	1	1	0	2
Jiri Kulich	1	0	0	0	−1	0
Matthew Savoie	1	0	0	0	0	0
Brett Murray	2	0	0	0	−1	2
Isak Rosen	7	0	0	0	−3	0

=== Goaltenders ===
Regular season
Player	GP	GS	TOI	W	L	OT	GA	GAA	SA	SV%	SO	G	A	PIM
Ukko-Pekka Luukkonen	54	51	3,081:14	27	22	4	132	2.57	1,470	.910	5	0	1	8
Devon Levi	23	21	1,294:54	10	8	2	67	3.10	666	.899	0	0	0	0
Eric Comrie	10	10	519:54	2	7	0	32	3.69	254	.874	0	0	0	0

^{†}Denotes player spent time with another team before joining the Sabres. Stats reflect time with the Sabres only.
^{‡}Denotes player was traded mid-season. Stats reflect time with the Sabres only.
Bold/italics denotes franchise record.

== Transactions ==
The Sabres have been involved in the following transactions during the 2023–24 season.

Key: † Contract is entry-level.
‡ Contract initially takes effect in the 2024–25 season.

=== Trades ===
Date	Details		Ref
August 18, 2023	To Anaheim Ducks Ilya Lyubushkin	To Buffalo Sabres 4th-round pick in the 2025	
December 6, 2023	To Columbus Blue Jackets conditional NSH 7th-round pick in 2025	To Buffalo Sabres Eric Robinson	
January 11, 2024	To Montreal Canadiens Filip Cederqvist	To Buffalo Sabres Future considerations	
March 6, 2024	To Colorado Avalanche Casey Mittelstadt	To Buffalo Sabres Bowen Byram	
March 8, 2024	To Florida Panthers Kyle Okposo	To Buffalo Sabres Calle Sjalin; Conditional 7th-round pick in 2024*	
March 8, 2024	To Philadelphia Flyers Erik Johnson	To Buffalo Sabres 4th-round pick in 2024	
March 8, 2024	To San Jose Sharks Devin Cooley	To Buffalo Sabres WSH 7th-round pick in 2025	

Notes:

- The pick will become a 5th-round pick if Florida wins the Stanley Cup.

=== Players acquired ===
Date	Player	Former team	Term	Via	Ref
July 1, 2023	Connor Clifton	Boston Bruins	3-year	Free agency	
July 1, 2023	Devin Cooley	Nashville Predators	1-year	Free agency	
July 1, 2023	Erik Johnson	Colorado Avalanche	1-year	Free agency	
July 1, 2023	Justin Richards	Columbus Blue Jackets	1-year	Free agency	
July 1, 2023	Dustin Tokarski	Pittsburgh Penguins	1-year	Free agency	

=== Players lost ===
Date	Player	New team	Term	Via	Ref
July 1, 2023	Malcolm Subban	St. Louis Blues	1-year	Free agency	
July 7, 2023	Vinnie Hinostroza	Pittsburgh Penguins	1-year	Free agency	
July 7, 2023	Michael Houser	Rochester Americans (AHL)	1-year	Free agency	
July 18, 2023	Austin Strand	Chicago Wolves (AHL)	1-year	Free agency	
August 2, 2023	Sean Malone	SCL Tigers (NL)	2-year	Free agency	
August 7, 2023	Matej Pekar	Hartford Wolf Pack (AHL)	1-year	Free agency	

=== Signings ===
Date	Player	Term	Ref
July 1, 2023	Tyson Jost	1-year	
July 4, 2023	Kale Clague	1-year	
July 14, 2023	Brett Murray	1-year	
July 14, 2023	Anton Wahlberg	3-year†	
July 17, 2023	Linus Weissbach	1-year	
July 28, 2023	Zach Benson	3-year†	
October 9, 2023	Rasmus Dahlin	8-year‡	
October 11, 2023	Owen Power	7-year‡	

== Draft picks ==
Below are the Buffalo Sabres selections at the 2023 NHL entry draft, which will be held on June 28 and 29, 2023, at Bridgestone Arena in Nashville, Tennessee. With their first selection, the Sabres selected Zach Benson from the Winnipeg Ice of the WHL.

Round	#	Player	Pos	Nationality	College/Junior/Club team (League)
1	13	Zach Benson	LW	Canada	Winnipeg Ice (WHL)
2	39	Anton Wahlberg	C	Sweden	Malmö Redhawks (SHL)
2	45	Maxim Strbak	D	Slovakia	Sioux Falls Stampede (USHL)
3	86	Gavin McCarthy	D	United States	Muskegon Lumberjacks (USHL)
4	109	Ethan Miedema	LW	Canada	Kingston Frontenacs (OHL)
5	141	Scott Ratzlaff	G	Canada	Seattle Thunderbirds (WHL)
6	173	Sean Keohane	D	United States	Dexter Dex (USHS-MA)
7	205	Norwin Panocha	D	Germany	Eisbären Berlin (DNL U20)
