= Declan Chisholm =

Canadian ice hockey player (born 2000)

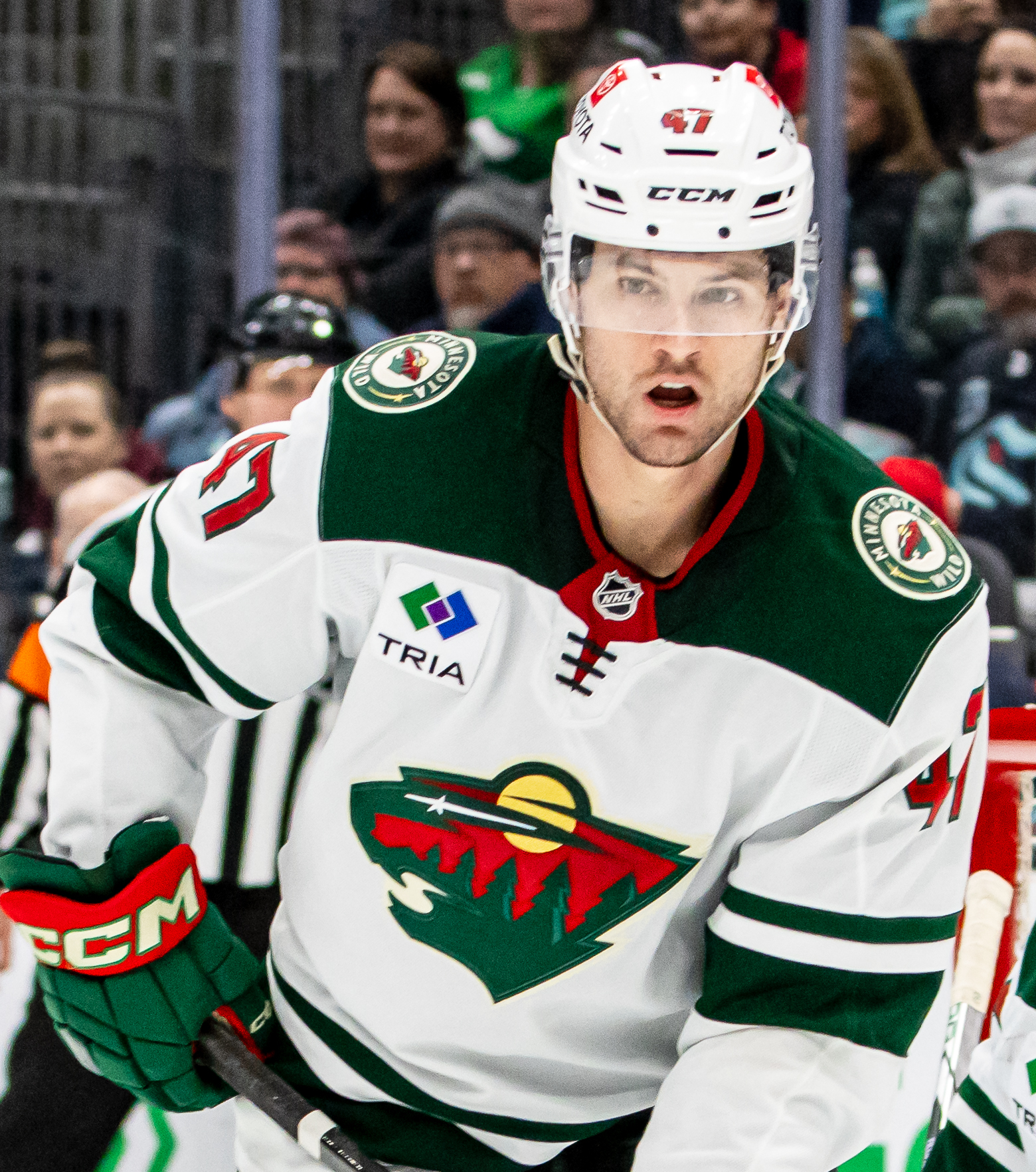
- Declan Chisholm in 2025
- Born: January 12, 2000 (age 26) Bowmanville, Ontario, Canada
- Height: 6 ft 1 in (185 cm)
- Weight: 185 lb (84 kg; 13 st 3 lb)
- Position: Defence
- Shoots: Left
- NHL team Former teams: New Jersey Devils; Winnipeg Jets; Minnesota Wild; Washington Capitals
- NHL draft: 150th overall, 2018; Winnipeg Jets
- Playing career: 2021–present

Declan Chisholm (born January 12, 2000) is a Canadian professional ice hockey player who is a defenceman for the New Jersey Devils of the National Hockey League (NHL). He was selected by the Winnipeg Jets in the fifth round, 150th overall, of the 2018 NHL entry draft.

== Early life ==
Chisholm was born on January 12, 2000, in Bowmanville, Ontario, to Paul Chisholm and Erin Fagan. As a young child, he battled a staphylococcal infection in his knee that required surgery; after spending some time using a walker, Chisholm joined a local youth ice hockey team, where he was placed on defence.

== Playing career ==
=== Junior ===
The Peterborough Petes of the Ontario Hockey League (OHL) selected Chisholm in the second round, 24th overall, of the 2016 OHL Priority Selection. He spent four years in the OHL; during his final season, he set career highs with 13 goals, 56 assists, and 69 points, the most of any Peterborough defenceman.

=== Professional ===
The Winnipeg Jets of the National Hockey League (NHL) selected Chisholm in the fifth round, 150th overall, of the 2018 NHL entry draft, and he signed a three-year, entry-level contract with the team on June 1, 2020. He made his professional hockey debut on February 22, 2021, playing for the Manitoba Moose, Winnipeg's American Hockey League (AHL) affiliate. With the Jets' roster depleted by COVID-19 issues throughout the team, Chisholm was called up to make his NHL debut on January 13, 2022, the day after his 22nd birthday. Chisholm, who had six goals and 14 points with Manitoba at the time of his call-up, was partnered with Nate Schmidt for Winnipeg's 3–0 shutout win over the Detroit Red Wings.

During the 2023–24 season, following just two games with the Jets serving primarily as a healthy scratch, Chisholm was claimed off waivers by the Minnesota Wild on January 29, 2024.

On June 28, 2025, at the 2025 NHL entry draft, Chisholm as a pending restricted free agent was traded by the Wild alongside a sixth-round draft pick to the Washington Capitals, in exchange for Chase Priskie and a fourth-round pick. He was promptly signed to a two-year, $3.2 million contract extension with the Capitals on July 1, 2025. In the 2025–26 season, Chisholm made his debut with the Capitals in his 100th career NHL appearance on October 12, 2025. Unable to cement himself as a regular amongst the Capitals blueline, Chisholm in a depth role posted 1 goal and 7 points in 26 games.

After a lone season with the Capitals, Chisholm was traded to the New Jersey Devils in exchange for a fourth-round pick in 2027 on June 25, 2026.

== Personal life ==
Chisholm is the grandson of Paddy Fagan, a lifelong hurling player in Ireland before he immigrated to Canada.

== Career statistics ==
			Regular season					Playoffs
Season	Team	League	GP	G	A	Pts	PIM	GP	G	A	Pts	PIM
2016–17	Peterborough Petes	OHL	41	1	4	5	6	12	0	1	1	0
2017–18	Peterborough Petes	OHL	47	3	17	20	16	—	—	—	—	—
2018–19	Peterborough Petes	OHL	67	5	43	48	32	5	2	2	4	2
2019–20	Peterborough Petes	OHL	59	13	56	69	33	—	—	—	—	—
2020–21	Manitoba Moose	AHL	28	2	11	13	18	—	—	—	—	—
2021–22	Manitoba Moose	AHL	53	9	21	30	20	5	2	5	7	0
2021–22	Winnipeg Jets	NHL	2	0	0	0	0	—	—	—	—	—
2022–23	Manitoba Moose	AHL	59	5	38	43	21	5	0	4	4	2
2023–24	Manitoba Moose	AHL	6	0	5	5	6	—	—	—	—	—
2023–24	Winnipeg Jets	NHL	2	0	1	1	0	—	—	—	—	—
2023–24	Minnesota Wild	NHL	29	3	5	8	18	—	—	—	—	—
2024–25	Minnesota Wild	NHL	66	2	10	12	10	—	—	—	—	—
2025–26	Washington Capitals	NHL	26	1	6	7	4	—	—	—	—	—
NHL totals			125	6	22	28	32	—	—	—	—	—
