= Adam Boqvist =

Swedish ice hockey player (born 2000)

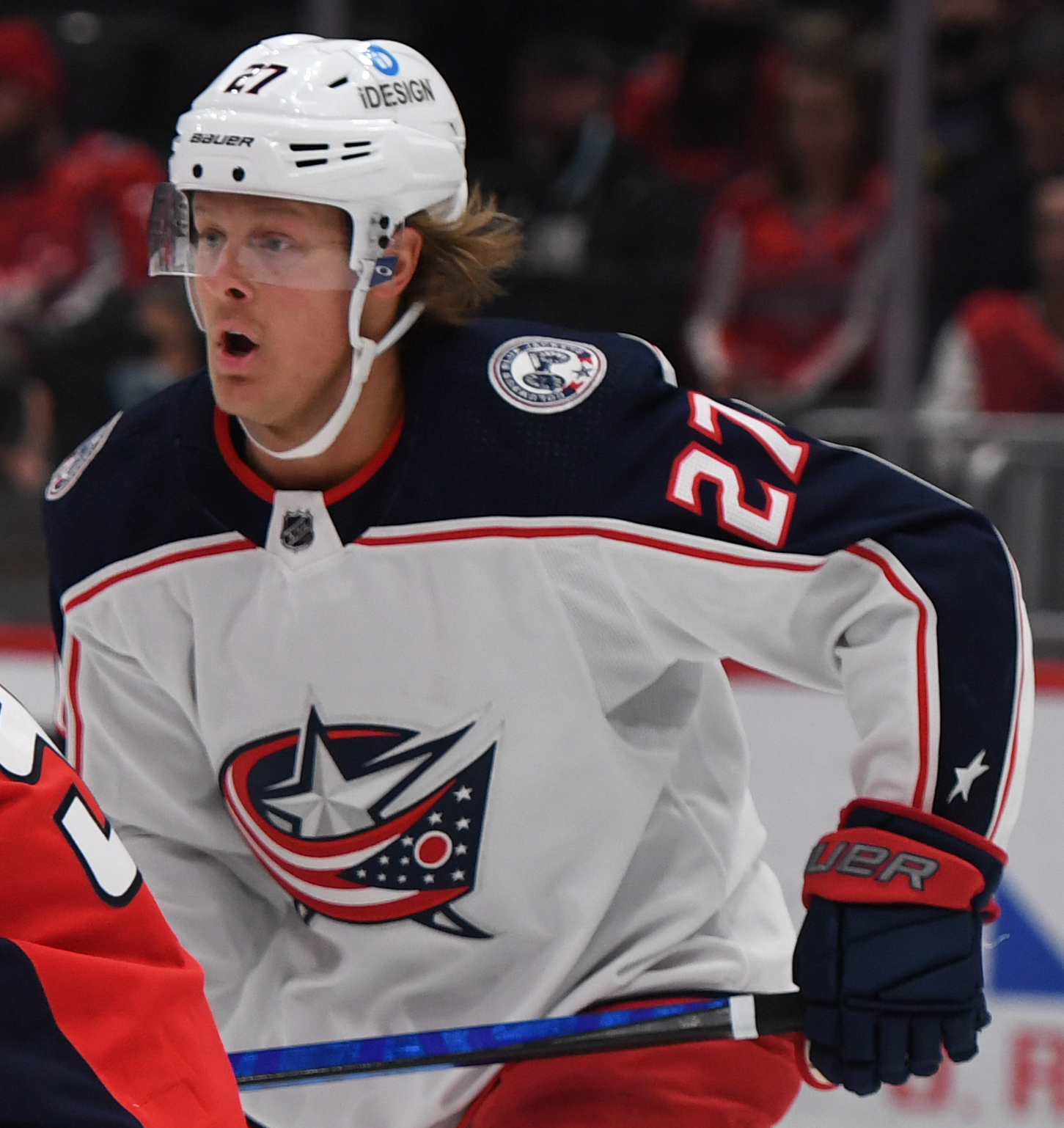
- Boqvist with the Columbus Blue Jackets in 2022
- Born: 15 August 2000 (age 26) Falun, Sweden
- Height: 6 ft 0 in (183 cm)
- Weight: 195 lb (88 kg; 13 st 13 lb)
- Position: Defence
- Shoots: Right
- NL team Former teams: Genève-Servette HC; Brynäs IF; Chicago Blackhawks; Columbus Blue Jackets; Florida Panthers; New York Islanders
- NHL draft: 8th overall, 2018; Chicago Blackhawks
- Playing career: 2017–present

Adam Boqvist (born 15 August 2000) is a Swedish professional ice hockey player who is a defenceman for Genève-Servette HC of the National League (NL). He was selected eighth overall by the Chicago Blackhawks in the 2018 NHL entry draft.

== Playing career ==
Boqvist made his Swedish Hockey League (SHL) debut with Brynäs IF on 21 September 2017.

Following the 2018 NHL entry draft, where he was selected eight overall, Boqvist signed a three-year, entry-level contract with the Chicago Blackhawks. On 5 July 2018, the London Knights of the Ontario Hockey League (OHL) announced that Boqvist would join the team for the 2018–19 season. Boqvist scored his first NHL career goal in a 3–2 win over the Anaheim Ducks on 3 November 2019.

On 23 July 2021, Boqvist, along with multiple draft picks, was traded to the Columbus Blue Jackets in exchange for Seth Jones and multiple draft picks. On 6 July 2022, Boqvist signed a three-year, $7.8 million contract extension with the Blue Jackets.

On 30 June 2024, the Blue Jackets placed Boqvist on unconditional waivers for a buyout; he successfully cleared and had the final year of his contract bought out, making him an unrestricted free agent. Boqvist had struggled with injuries during his three seasons with the Blue Jackets.

On 9 July 2024, Boqvist signed a one-year, $775,000 contract with the Florida Panthers, joining his older brother, Jesper who had also signed with the Panthers. Adam skated in 18 games for Florida during the 2024–25 season, recording six points.

On 31 January 2025, the New York Islanders claimed Boqvist off waivers from the Panthers. He played the remainder of the season for the Islanders, appearing in 17 games. On 30 May, the Islanders re-signed Boqvist to a one-year, $850,000 contract extension.

On 11 October 2026, Boqvist signed a one-year contract with Genève-Servette HC of the National League (NL).

== Personal life ==
Adam's older brother Jesper Boqvist is a centre for the New Jersey Devils.

== Career statistics ==
=== Regular season and playoffs ===
			Regular season					Playoffs
Season	Team	League	GP	G	A	Pts	PIM	GP	G	A	Pts	PIM
2015–16	Brynäs IF	J18	17	3	6	9	2	—	—	—	—	—
2016–17	Brynäs IF	J18	8	8	6	14	2	—	—	—	—	—
2016–17	Brynäs IF	J20	18	4	12	16	10	2	0	0	0	0
2017–18	Brynäs IF	J20	25	14	10	24	18	3	3	2	5	29
2017–18	Brynäs IF	SHL	15	0	1	1	4	3	0	0	0	0
2017–18	Almtuna IS	Allsv	7	0	2	2	2	—	—	—	—	—
2018–19	London Knights	OHL	54	20	40	60	12	11	10	3	13	6
2019–20	Rockford IceHogs	AHL	15	1	5	6	10	—	—	—	—	—
2019–20	Chicago Blackhawks	NHL	41	4	9	13	6	8	0	0	0	4
2020–21	Chicago Blackhawks	NHL	35	2	14	16	14	—	—	—	—	—
2021–22	Columbus Blue Jackets	NHL	52	11	11	22	12	—	—	—	—	—
2022–23	Columbus Blue Jackets	NHL	46	5	19	24	8	—	—	—	—	—
2023–24	Columbus Blue Jackets	NHL	35	1	9	10	0	—	—	—	—	—
2024–25	Florida Panthers	NHL	18	2	4	6	6	—	—	—	—	—
2024–25	New York Islanders	NHL	17	2	6	8	4	—	—	—	—	—
2025–26	New York Islanders	NHL	28	0	4	4	8	—	—	—	—	—
SHL totals			15	0	1	1	4	3	0	0	0	0
NHL totals			272	27	76	103	58	8	0	0	0	4

=== International ===
Medal record

Men's ice hockey

Representing Sweden

World U18 Championships
Bronze medal – third place	2018 Russia	

Year	Team	Event	Result	GP	G	A	Pts	PIM
2016	Sweden	U17	1st place, gold medalist(s)	6	4	0	4	6
2017	Sweden	U18	4th	6	0	0	0	0
2017	Sweden	IH18	3rd place, bronze medalist(s)	5	1	7	8	0
2018	Sweden	U18	3rd place, bronze medalist(s)	6	3	3	6	2
2019	Sweden	WJC	5th	5	1	3	4	0
Junior totals				28	9	13	22	8

Awards and achievements
Preceded by Henri Jokiharju	Chicago Blackhawks first-round draft pick 2018	Succeeded by Nicolas Beaudin
