= Luca Hollenstein =

Swiss ice hockey player

- Born: 5 March 2000 (age 25); Chur, Switzerland
- Height: 5 ft 11 in (180 cm)
- Weight: 175 lb (79 kg; 12 st 7 lb)
- Position: Goaltender
- Catches: Left
- NL team Former teams: HC Davos; EV Zug
- NHL draft: Undrafted
- Playing career: 2017–present

Luca Hollenstein is a Swiss professional ice hockey goaltender who is currently playing with HC Davos of the National League (NL). He previously played with EV Zug.

== Playing career ==
Hollenstein made his professional debut during the 2017-18 season, appearing in 2 games with the EVZ Academy of the Swiss League (SL). However, he played the majority of the season with EV Zug U20 in the Elite Junior League. Hollenstein officially turned pro when he signed his first contract with EV Zug on 24 October 2019, agreeing to a two-year deal. He went on to make his National League (NL) debut with EV Zug during the 2019–20 season but mostly assumed back-up duties behind Leonardo Genoni.

== International play ==
Hollenstein was named to Switzerland's U20 national team for the 2019 World Junior Championships in Canada. He led Switzerland to a fourth place finish, falling to Finland in the semi-finals. Hollenstein was again part of the team for the 2020 World Junior Championships in the Czech Republic.

== Personal life ==
Hollenstein was born in Chur, Grisons, Switzerland. He has played with EHC Chur's junior teams since he was 6 years old. At age 15, he moved to Zug to join EV Zug U17 team.
