= 2019 World Junior Ice Hockey Championships =

2020 edition of the World Junior Ice Hockey Championships

2019 IIHF World Junior Championships

Tournament details
- Host country: Canada
- Venue(s): Rogers Arena; Save-On-Foods Memorial Centre (in 2 host cities)
- Dates: December 26, 2018 – January 5, 2019
- Teams: 10

Final positions
- Champions: Finland (5th title)
- Runners-up: United States
- Third place: Russia
- Fourth place: Switzerland

Tournament statistics
- Games played: 30
- Goals scored: 176 (5.87 per game)
- Attendance: 304,393 (10,146 per game)
- Scoring leader: (Russia) Grigori Denisenko (9 points)

Awards
- MVP: (United States) Ryan Poehling

The 2019 World Junior Ice Hockey Championships (2019 WJC) was the 43rd edition of the Ice Hockey World Junior Championship. It began on December 26, 2018, and ended with the gold medal game being played on January 5, 2019. This marked the 15th time that Canada hosted the WJC.

On December 1, 2016, it was announced that Vancouver and Victoria, British Columbia had won the bid to host the 2019 World Juniors. This was the second time that Vancouver served as the primary host of the tournament, and the first time that Victoria had hosted in any capacity.

== Top Division ==
=== Venues ===
Vancouver	2019 World Junior Ice Hockey Championships is located in Canada	Victoria
Rogers Arena Capacity: 18,910	2019 World Junior Ice Hockey Championships is located in Canada	Save-On-Foods Memorial Centre Capacity: 7,006

=== Match officials ===
The following officials were assigned by the International Ice Hockey Federation to officiate the 2019 World Junior Championships.

Referees

- (Canada) Jonathan Alarie
- (United States) Kenneth Anderson
- (Latvia) Andris Ansons
- (Sweden) Tobias Björk
- (United States) Andrew Bruggeman
- (Finland) Lassi Heikkinen
- (Canada) Jeff Ingram
- (Czech Republic) Daniel Pražák
- (Russia) Yevgeni Romasko
- (Belarus) Maxim Sidorenko
- (Sweden) Mikael Sjöqvist
- (Slovakia) Peter Stano

Linesmen

- (Canada) Maxime Chaput
- (Belarus) Dmitri Golyak
- (Canada) Michael Harrington
- (Czech Republic) Daniel Hynek
- (Switzerland) Balazs Kovacs
- (Finland) Lauri Nikulainen
- (United States) Brian Oliver
- (Slovakia) Peter Šefčík
- (Russia) Dmitri Shishlo
- (Sweden) Emil Yletyinen

=== Seeding ===
The seedings in the preliminary round were based on the 2018 tournament's final standings using the serpentine system. On 6 Jan 2018, the IIHF announced the groups. With Kazakhstan being promoted from Division I A after winning the 2018 Division I A Tournament.

Group A (Vancouver)

- Canada (1)
- Czech Republic (4)
- Russia (5)
- Switzerland (8)
- Denmark (9)

Group B (Victoria)

- Sweden (2)
- United States (3)
- Finland (6)
- Slovakia (7)
- Kazakhstan (11-Promoted)

=== Format ===
The preliminary round saw teams play in two groups of five teams each, using the round-robin format. The playoff consisted of three rounds. In the round-robin, three points were allotted for a regulation win, and two points for an overtime or shootout win. One point was allotted for an overtime or shootout loss.

The four highest-ranked teams from each group of the preliminary round advanced to the quarterfinals, while the last-placed team from each group played a best-of-three series, with the loser being relegated to Division IA for 2020 and replaced by the winner of Division IA. All other teams retained their Top Division status for the 2020 edition.

=== Preliminary round ===
All times are local. (Pacific Standard Time – UTC-8)

==== Group A ====
Pos	Team	Pld	W	OTW	OTL	L	GF	GA	GD	Pts	Qualification
1	Russia	4	4	0	0	0	15	6	+9	12	Quarterfinals
2	Canada (H)	4	3	0	0	1	23	5	+18	9	Quarterfinals
3	Czech Republic	4	1	1	0	2	8	8	0	5	Quarterfinals
4	Switzerland	4	1	0	1	2	11	12	−1	4	Quarterfinals
5	Denmark	4	0	0	0	4	0	26	−26	0	Relegation round

Source: IIHF
(H) Host

26 December 2018; 13:00	Czech Republic	2–1 OT (0–0, 1–1, 0–0) (OT: 1–0)	Switzerland	Rogers Arena, Vancouver; Attendance: 9,266

Game reference

Lukáš Dostál
Goalies
Luca Hollenstein
Referees:
(United States) Kenneth Anderson
(United States) Andrew Bruggeman
Linesmen:
(Belarus) Dmitri Golyak
(Slovakia) Peter Šefčík

	0–1	27:45 – Eggenberger (Leuenberger, Kurashev) (PP)
Kaut (Nečas, Galvas) – 29:02	1–1
Kvasnička (Kaut, Lauko) – 60:52	2–1

16 min
Penalties
18 min
27
Shots
27

26 December 2018; 17:00	Canada	14–0 (3–0, 5–0, 6–0)	Denmark	Rogers Arena, Vancouver; Attendance: 16,417

Game reference

Michael DiPietro
Goalies
Mads Søgaard
William Rørth
Referees:
(Sweden) Tobias Björk
(Belarus) Maxim Sidorenko
Linesmen:
(Finland) Lauri Nikulainen
(United States) Brian Oliver

Frost (Leason, Hayton) – 4:52	1–0
Tippett (Frost, Glass) – 8:32	2–0
Frost (Phillips, Bouchard) – 19:17	3–0
Comtois (Glass, Mitchell) – 20:45	4–0
Frost (Suzuki, DiPietro) – 21:50	5–0
Studnicka (Glass, Bouchard) (PP) – 27:46	6–0
Tippett (Bouchard) – 33:42	7–0
Anderson-Dolan – 39:08	8–0
Comtois (Smith, Mitchell) (EA) – 42:52	9–0
Comtois (Glass, Phillips) – 47:01	10–0
Leason (Veleno, Bowers) – 49:02	11–0
Leason (Frost, Brook) – 52:47	12–0
Comtois (Leason, Hayton) – 53:27	13–0
Entwistle (Studnicka, McIssac) – 56:47	14–0

6 min
Penalties
8 min
45
Shots
14

27 December 2018; 13:00	Russia	4–0 (1–0, 1–0, 2–0)	Denmark	Rogers Arena, Vancouver; Attendance: 9,939

Game reference

Daniil Tarasov
Goalies
William Rørth
Referees:
(United States) Ken Anderson
(Finland) Lassi Hekkinen
Linesmen:
(Finland) Lauri Nikulainen
(Slovakia) Peter Šefčík

Kravtsov (Denisenko, Kostin) (PP) – 06:28	1–0
Romanov (Kostin, Kravtsov) – 37:49	2–0
Shen (Romanov, Alexeyev) – 53:54	3–0
Iv. Morozov (Slepets, Romanov) (ENG) – 58:34	4–0

26 min
Penalties
8 min
18
Shots
20

27 December 2018; 17:00	Switzerland	2–3 (0–1, 1–2, 1–0)	Canada	Rogers Arena, Vancouver; Attendance: 17,102

Game reference

Akira Schmid
Goalies
Ian Scott
Referees:
(United States) Andrew Bruggeman
(Slovakia) Peter Stano
Linesmen:
(Belarus) Dmitri Golyak
(Sweden) Emil Yletyinen

	0–1	00:36 – Glass (Suzuki, Comtois)
Kurashev (Müller, Eggenberger) (PP) – 20:46	1–1
	1–2	25:55 – Entwistle (Bowers)
	1–3	32:08 – Dobson (Hayton)
Kurashev (Müller, Eggenberger) (PP, EA) – 58:11	2–3

12 min
Penalties
12 min
17
Shots
32

28 December 2018; 17:00	Czech Republic	1–2 (0–1, 1–1, 0–0)	Russia	Rogers Arena, Vancouver; Attendance: 14,523

Game reference

Lukáš Dostál
Goalies
Pyotr Kochetkov
Referees:
(Sweden) Tobias Björk
(Slovakia) Peter Stano
Linesmen:
(United States) Brian Oliver
(Sweden) Emil Yletyinen

	0–1	17:05 – Galimov (Slepets) (SH)
	0–2	35:03 – Kovalenko (Shen, Alexeyev) (SH)
Kondelík (Kvasnička, Plášek) (PP) – 35:50	1–2

14 min
Penalties
10 min
25
Shots
28

29 December 2018; 13:00	Denmark	0–4 (0–2, 0–1, 0–1)	Switzerland	Rogers Arena, Vancouver; Attendance: 10,279

Game reference

Mads Søgaard
Goalies
Luca Hollenstein
Referees:
(Sweden) Tobias Björk
(Belarus) Maxim Sidorenko
Linesmen:
(United States) Brian Oliver
(Slovakia) Peter Šefčík

0–1	08:51 – Kurashev (Müller, Berni) (PP)
0–2	19:08 – Kurashev (Eggenberger, Moser)
0–3	33:29 – Le Coultre (Sigrist, Müller)
0–4	41:38 – Kurashev (Gross, Berni)

4 min
Penalties
8 min
21
Shots
26

29 December 2018; 17:00	Canada	5–1 (3–1, 1–0, 1–0)	Czech Republic	Rogers Arena, Vancouver; Attendance: 17,012

Game reference

Michael DiPietro
Goalies
Jiri Patera
Jakub Škarek
Referees:
(United States) Kenneth Anderson
(Finland) Lassi Hekkinen
Linesmen:
(Belarus) Dmitri Golyak
(Finland) Lauri Nikulainen

Comtois (Tippett, Phillips) – 06:03	1–0
	1–1	06:40 – Machala (Jeník)
Leason (Smith, Frost) (PP) – 11:32	2–1
Lafrenière (Studnicka, Brook) – 16:39	3–1
Entwistle (Veleno, Studnicka) – 34:41	4–1
Frost (Suzuki, Smith) (PP) – 49:01	5–1

6 min
Penalties
30 min
30
Shots
24

30 December 2018; 17:00	Switzerland	4–7 (2–1, 1–2, 1–4)	Russia	Rogers Arena, Vancouver; Attendance: 13,724

Game reference

Akira Schmid
Goalies
Daniil Tarasov
Referees:
(Finland) Lassi Heikkinen
(Belarus) Maxim Sidorenko
Linesmen:
(Slovakia) Peter Šefčík
(Sweden) Emil Yletyinen

Lehmann (Tanner, Leuenberger) – 00:49	1–0
Nussbaumer (Bruschweiler, Moser) – 09:06	2–0
	2–1	14:27 – Marchenko (Podkolzin, Alexeyev)
Lehmann (Leuenberger) – 25:46	3–1
	3–2	26:07 – Samorukov
	3–3	31:58 – Denisenko (Kravtsov, Samorukov) (PP)
	3–4	42:04 – Slepets (SH)
	3–5	46:36 – Alexeyev (Romanov, Shashkov) (PP)
Bruschweiler (Nussbaumer, Abeischer) – 47:13	4–5
	4–6	51:42 – Shen (Shashkov, Olshansky)
	4–7	52:50 – Kravtsov (Denisenko, Kostin)

6 min
Penalties
29 min
31
Shots
41

31 December 2018; 13:00	Denmark	0–4 (0–2, 0–1, 0–1)	Czech Republic	Rogers Arena, Vancouver; Attendance: 10,204

Game reference

Mads Søgaard
Goalies
Lukáš Dostál
Referees:
(Slovakia) Peter Stano
(Canada) Jeff Ingram
Linesmen:
(United States) Brian Oliver
(Canada) Maxime Chaput

0–1	08:10 – Lauko (Hrabik)
0–2	11:59 – Nečas (Zadina, Kvasnička) (PP)
0–3	28:03 – Kaut (Kondelík, Nečas) (PP)
0–4	57:46 – Král (Bukač, Kern) (SH, ENG)

10 min
Penalties
14 min
20
Shots
34

31 December 2018; 17:00	Russia	2–1 (1–1, 0–0, 1–0)	Canada	Rogers Arena, Vancouver; Attendance: 17,556

Game reference

Pyotr Kochetkov
Goalies
Michael DiPietro
Referees:
(United States) Andrew Bruggeman
(Sweden) Mikael Sjöqvist
Linesmen:
(Switzerland) Balazs Kovacs
(Sweden) Emil Yletyinen

	0–1	02:20 – Glass (Tippett)
Denisenko (Kravtsov, Samorukov) (PP) – 05:21	1–1
Shen (Romanov) – 51:00	2–1

10 min
Penalties
18 min
31
Shots
31

==== Group B ====
Pos	Team	Pld	W	OTW	OTL	L	GF	GA	GD	Pts	Qualification
1	Sweden	4	3	1	0	0	16	8	+8	11	Quarterfinals
2	United States	4	3	0	1	0	18	9	+9	10	Quarterfinals
3	Finland	4	2	0	0	2	12	7	+5	6	Quarterfinals
4	Slovakia	4	1	0	0	3	15	14	+1	3	Quarterfinals
5	Kazakhstan	4	0	0	0	4	5	28	−23	0	Relegation round

Source: IIHF

26 December 2018; 15:30	United States	2–1 (0–0, 0–1, 2–0)	Slovakia	Save-On-Foods Memorial Centre, Victoria; Attendance: 6,208

Game reference

Kyle Keyser
Goalies
Samuel Hlavaj
Referees:
(Canada) Jeff Ingram
(Sweden) Mikael Sjöqvist
Linesmen:
(Canada) Maxime Chaput
(Russia) Dmitri Shishlo

	0–1	37:17 – Korenčik (Liška)
Anderson (J. Hughes) (PP) – 41:10	1–1
Baratt (Madden, Samberg) – 45:42	2–1

4 min
Penalties
6 min
34
Shots
14

26 December 2018; 19:30	Finland	1–2 (0–1, 0–1, 1–0)	Sweden	Save-On-Foods Memorial Centre, Victoria; Attendance: 6,319

Game reference

Ukko-Pekka Luukkonen
Goalies
Samuel Ersson
Referees:
(Canada) Jonathan Alarie
(Russia) Yevgeni Romasko
Linesmen:
(Canada) Michael Harrington
(Switzerland) Balazs Kovacs

	0–1	13:14 – Brännström (Lundeström, Boqvist) (PP)
	0–2	23:55 – Brännström (Bemström, Boqvist) (PP2)
Talvitie (Kakko, Ylönen) (PP) – 56:26	1–2

14 min
Penalties
6 min
30
Shots
30

27 December 2018; 15:30	Slovakia	2–5 (1–2, 0–1, 1–2)	Sweden	Save-On-Foods Memorial Centre, Victoria; Attendance: 5,896

Game reference

Juraj Sklenár
Goalies
Samuel Ersson
Referees:
(Canada) Jeff Ingram
(Czech Republic) Daniel Pražák
Linesmen:
(Canada) Michael Harrington
(Czech Republic) Daniel Hynek

	0–1	11:42 – Elvenes
Liška (Hrehorčák, Fehérváry) (PP) – 13:43	1–1
	1–2	16:12 – Bemström (Hugg, Lundkvist)
	1–3	26:40 – Bemström (Elvenes, Sandin) (PP)
	1–4	45:09 – Brännström (Lundeström, Boqvist) (PP)
Fafrák – 48:57	2–4
	2–5	52:37 – Lundeström

8 min
Penalties
12 min
22
Shots
26

27 December 2018; 19:30	Finland	5–0 (2–0, 1–0, 2–0)	Kazakhstan	Save-On-Foods Memorial Centre, Victoria; Attendance: 5,863

Game reference

Filip Lindberg
Goalies
Demid Yeremeyev
Referees:
(Latvia) Andris Ansons
(Sweden) Mikael Sjöqvist
Linesmen:
(Canada) Maxime Chaput
(Switzerland) Balazs Kovacs

Latvala (Virtanen, Ylönen) – 12:52	1–0
Talvitie – 15:08	2–0
Vainionpää (Puustinen) – 32:49	3–0
Kakko (Lundell, Ylönen) – 47:17	4–0
Heponiemi (Kupari, Jokiharju) – 49:13	5–0

2 min
Penalties
10 min
56
Shots
18

28 December 2018; 19:30	Kazakhstan	2–8 (1–4, 0–3, 1–1)	United States	Save-On-Foods Memorial Centre, Victoria; Attendance: 6,185

Game reference

Vladislav Nurek
Demid Yeremeyev
Goalies
Cayden Primeau
Referees:
(Canada) Jonathan Alarie
(Czech Republic) Daniel Pražák
Linesmen:
(Czech Republic) Daniel Hynek
(Russia) Dmitri Shishlo

	0–1	01:37 – Wahlstrom (Poehling)
Buyalsky (Orekhov) – 01:55	1–1
	1–2	05:13 – Farabee (Robertson, Q. Hughes) (PP)
	1–3	08:53 – Farabee (Robertson, Norris)
	1–4	12:05 – Farabee (Robertson)
	1–5	25:45 – Chmelevski (Poehling, Anderson) (PP)
	1–6	30:50 – Poehling
	1–7	32:11 – Madden (Miller)
	1–8	40:23 – Norris (Robertson)
Mitenkov (Orekhov, Gatiyatov) – 49:56	2–8

14 min
Penalties
10 min
13
Shots
66

29 December 2018; 15:30	Slovakia	1–5 (0–2, 1–2, 0–1)	Finland	Save-On-Foods Memorial Centre, Victoria; Attendance: 6,045

Game reference

Samuel Hlavaj
Goalies
Ukko-Pekka Luukkonen
Referees:
(Latvia) Andris Ansons
(Sweden) Mikael Sjöqvist
Linesmen:
(Canada) Michael Harrington
(Czech Republic) Daniel Hynek

	0–1	12:24 – Jokiharju (Heponiemi, Tolvanen) (PP2)
	0–2	16:43 – Virtanen (Vaakanainen, Talvitie)
	0–3	22:02 – Heinola (Kakko, Jokiharju)
	0–4	33:53 – Lundell (Heinola)
Roman (Fehérváry, Ivan) (PP2) – 36:24	1–4
	1–5	53:01 – Laaksonen (Tolvanen, Luukonen)

12 min
Penalties
12 min
23
Shots
36

29 December 2018; 19:30	Sweden	5–4 OT (1–0, 2–0, 1–4) (OT: 1–0)	United States	Save-On-Foods Memorial Centre, Victoria; Attendance: 6,602

Game reference

Samuel Ersson
Goalies
Kyle Keyser
Referees:
(Canada) Jeff Ingram
(Russia) Yevgeni Romasko
Linesmen:
(Canada) Maxime Chaput
(Switzerland) Balazs Kovacs

Westerlund (Fagemo, Elvenes) – 04:47	1–0
Hugg (Bemström, Broberg) – 29:21	2–0
Bemström (Gustafsson) – 32:39	3–0
Brännström (Gustafsson, Westerlund) – 42:33	4–0
	4–1	49:34 – Anderson (Chmelevski, Poehling) (PP)
	4–2	53:25 – Poehling (Wahlstrom, Chmelevski)
	4–3	59:23 – Poehling (Wahlstrom, Q. Hughes) (EA)
	4–4	59:36 – Poehling (Farabee) (EA)
Boqvist (Elvenes) – 63:51	5–4

6 min
Penalties
4 min
33
Shots
29

30 December 2018; 19:30	Kazakhstan	2–11 (0–6, 1–3, 1–2)	Slovakia	Save-On-Foods Memorial Centre, Victoria; Attendance: 5,685

Game reference

Demid Yeremeyev
Vladislav Nurek
Goalies
Samuel Hlavaj
Referees:
(Czech Republic) Daniel Pražák
(Russia) Yevgeni Romasko
Linesmen:
(Canada) Michael Harrington
(Russia) Dmitri Shishlo

	0–1	00:22 – Liška (Hrehorčák, Roman)
	0–2	00:32 – Ružička (Pospíšil, Korenčík)
	0–3	05:26 – Ružička (Korenčík, Krivošík) (PP)
	0–4	08:21 – Kollár (Kelemen)
	0–5	11:20 – Krivošík (Ružička)
	0–6	14:17 – Dlugoš (Baláž, Regenda)
	0–7	22:27 – Kollár
	0–8	27:41 – Roman (Hrehorčák, Liška) (PP)
Gatiyatov (Sam. Daniyar, Orekhov) (PP2) – 30:13	1–8
	1–9	33:36 – Regenda (Demo)
Gatiyatov (Muratov, Sam. Daniyar) (PP) – 46:25	2–9
	2–10	54:13 – Dlugoš (Balaž, Regenda)
	2–11	59:47 – Kollár (Kelemen, Demo)

10 min
Penalties
14 min
18
Shots
46

31 December 2018; 15:30	Sweden	4–1 (3–0, 0–0, 1–1)	Kazakhstan	Save-On-Foods Memorial Centre, Victoria; Attendance: 5,362

Game reference

Olle Eriksson Ek
Goalies
Denis Karatayev
Referees:
(United States) Ken Anderson
(Latvia) Andris Ansons
Linesmen:
(Finland) Lauri Nikulainen
(Russia) Dmitri Shishlo

Bemström (Bäck, Sandin) – 07:10	1–0
Sandin (Lundeström) – 12:13	2–0
Lundkvist – 16:49	3–0
	3–1	49:46 – Muratov (Orekhov, Sam. Daniyar) (PP)
Sandin (Gustafsson) – 59:21	4–1

10 min
Penalties
2 min
56
Shots
11

31 December 2018; 19:30	United States	4–1 (1–0, 2–0, 1–1)	Finland	Save-On-Foods Memorial Centre, Victoria; Attendance: 6,556

Game reference

Cayden Primeau
Goalies
Ukko-Pekka Luukkonen
Referees:
(Canada) Jonathan Alarie
(Sweden) Tobias Björk
Linesmen:
(Belarus) Dmitri Golyak
(Czech Republic) Daniel Hynek

Robertson (Farabee) – 19:51	1–0
Madden (Norris) – 31:40	2–0
Poehling (Kemp) – 36:42	3–0
Madden (Norris, Robertson) (PP) – 42:02	4–0
	4–1	Ylönen (Vaakanainen, Talvitie) – 53:16

6 min
Penalties
30 min
39
Shots
28

=== Relegation round ===
2 January 2019; 11:00	Kazakhstan	4–3 (2–1, 1–0, 1–2)	Denmark	Rogers Arena, Vancouver; Attendance: 5,975

Game reference

Demid Yeremeyev
Goalies
Mads Søgaard
Referees:
(United States) Andrew Bruggeman
(Sweden) Mikael Sjöqvist
Linesmen:
(Switzerland) Balazs Kovacs
(Slovakia) Peter Šefčík

Boiko (Shinkaretski, Buyalski) - 01:36	1–0
	1–1	09:00 – Røndbjerg (Schultz, Setkov)
Musabayev (Korolyov, Dyomin) – 11:16	2–1
Say. Daniyar (Gatiyatov, Sam. Daniyar) (PP) – 33:00	3–1
	3–2	41:29 – Grundtvig (Andersen, Kubars)
Gatiyatov – 48:06	4–2
	4–3	57:40 – Setkov (Røndbjerg) (PP)

10 min
Penalties
14 min
19
Shots
43

4 January 2019; 09:00	Denmark	0–4 (0–2, 0–0, 0–2)	Kazakhstan	Rogers Arena, Vancouver; Attendance: 3,502

Game reference

Mads Søgaard
William Rørth
Goalies
Demid Yeremeyev
Referees:
(Latvia) Andris Ansons
(Slovakia) Peter Stano
Linesmen:
(Switzerland) Balazs Kovacs
(Slovakia) Peter Šefčík

0–1	00:35 – Say. Daniyar (Gatiyatov)
0–2	04:47 – Makutski (Zhorabek, Shinkaretski)
0–3	58:27 – Gatiyatov (Muratov, Orekhov) (ENG)
0–4	59:05 – Gatiyatov (Muratov, Sam. Daniyar) (ENG)

6 min
Penalties
18 min
25
Shots
16

Note: Denmark was relegated to the 2020 Division I A

=== Playoff round ===
==== Bracket ====
Quarterfinals
1A	Russia	8
4B	Slovakia	3
2B	United States	3
3A	Czech Republic	1
1B	Sweden	0
4A	Switzerland	2
2A	Canada	1
3B	Finland (OT)	2

Semifinals
1A	Russia	1
2B	United States	2
4A	Switzerland	1
3B	Finland	6

Final
2B	United States	2
3B	Finland	3
Third place
1A	Russia	5
4A	Switzerland	2

==== Quarterfinals ====
2 January 2019; 13:00	Sweden	0–2 (0–1, 0–1, 0–0)	Switzerland	Save-On-Foods Memorial Centre, Victoria; Attendance: 5,946

Game reference
Samuel Ersson	Goalies	Luca Hollenstein	Referees: (United States) Kenneth Anderson (Finland) Lassi Heikkinen; Linesmen: (Czech Republic) Daniel Hynek (Finland) Lauri Nikulainen
0–1 / 15:23 – Bruschweiler (Burger); 0–2 / 33:59 – Wyss (S. Schmid, Verboon)			Referees: (United States) Kenneth Anderson (Finland) Lassi Heikkinen; Linesmen: (Czech Republic) Daniel Hynek (Finland) Lauri Nikulainen
32 min	Penalties	20 min	Referees: (United States) Kenneth Anderson (Finland) Lassi Heikkinen; Linesmen: (Czech Republic) Daniel Hynek (Finland) Lauri Nikulainen
41	Shots	35	Referees: (United States) Kenneth Anderson (Finland) Lassi Heikkinen; Linesmen: (Czech Republic) Daniel Hynek (Finland) Lauri Nikulainen

2 January 2019; 15:30	Canada	1–2 OT (0–0, 1–0, 0–1) (OT: 0–1)	Finland	Rogers Arena, Vancouver; Attendance: 17,047

Game reference

Michael DiPietro
Goalies
Ukko-Pekka Luukkonen
Referees:
(Czech Republic) Daniel Pražák
(Russia) Yevgeni Romasko
Linesmen:
(United States) Brian Oliver
(Sweden) Emil Yletyinen

Mitchell (Hayton, Frost) – 21:30	1–0
	1–1	59:13 – Heponiemi (Tolvanen, Vaakanainen) (EA)
	1–2	65:17 – Utunen (Talvitie, Heponiemi)

4 min
Penalties
6 min
25
Shots
34

2 January 2019; 17:00	United States	3–1 (1–0, 1–0, 1–1)	Czech Republic	Save-On-Foods Memorial Centre, Victoria; Attendance: 6,263

Game reference

Cayden Primeau
Goalies
Lukáš Dostál
Referees:
(Canada) Jonathan Alarie
(Sweden) Tobias Björk
Linesmen:
(Belarus) Dmitri Golyak
(Russia) Dmitri Shishlo

Cates (J. Hughes) – 12:12	1–0
Norris (Robertson) – 26:10	2–0
	2–1	51:29 – Kaut (Nečas, Jeník) (PP)
Chmelevski (Anderson) (ENG) – 59:21	3–1

2 min
Penalties
6 min
41
Shots
19

2 January 2019; 19:30	Russia	8–3 (4–0, 3–0, 1–3)	Slovakia	Rogers Arena, Vancouver; Attendance: 11,317

Game reference

Pyotr Kochetkov
Daniil Tarasov
Goalies
Samuel Hlavaj
Juraj Sklenár
Referees:
(Canada) Jeff Ingram
(Belarus) Maxim Sidorenko
Linesmen:
(Canada) Maxime Chaput
(Canada) Michael Harrington

Denisenko (Samorukov, Kravtsov) – 05:36	1–0
Starkov (Kovalenko, Romanov) – 06:07	2–0
Alexeyev (Kovalenko, Starkov) – 07:49	3–0
Shashkov (Romanov, Podkolzin) – 10:56	4–0
Kostin (Denisenko, Zhuravlyov) – 31:40	5–0
Kostin (Denisenko, Alexeyev) (PP) – 38:20	6–0
Slepets (Galimov, Muranov) – 39:38	7–0
	7–1	43:35 – Fehérváry (Ivan, Pospíšil)
Il. Morozov (Shashkov, Olshansky) – 52:03	8–1
	8–2	58:58 – Roman (Ivan, Fehérváry)
	8–3	59:51 – Ivan (Fehérváry, Liška) (PP)

12 min
Penalties
8 min
30
Shots
35

==== Semifinals ====
4 January 2019; 13:00	Russia	1–2 (0–1, 1–1, 0–0)	United States	Rogers Arena, Vancouver; Attendance: 14,355

Game reference

Pyotr Kochetkov
Goalies
Cayden Primeau
Referees:
(Canada) Jeff Ingram
(Sweden) Mikael Sjöqvist
Linesmen:
(Canada) Michael Harrington
(Finland) Lauri Nikulainen

	0–1	14:29 – Wahlstrom (Cockerill, Samberg)
	0–2	24:20 – Chmelevski (J. Hughes) (PP)
Denisenko – 33:36	1–2

6 min
Penalties
6 min
35
Shots
27

4 January 2019; 17:00	Finland	6–1 (4–1, 2–0, 0–0)	Switzerland	Rogers Arena, Vancouver; Attendance: 14,014

Game reference

Ukko-Pekka Luukkonen
Goalies
Luca Hollenstein
Akira Schmid
Referees:
(United States) Andrew Bruggeman
(Belarus) Maxim Sidorenko
Linesmen:
(Belarus) Dmitri Golyak
(Russia) Dmitri Shishlo

Ylönen (Virtanen) – 00:40	1–0
Talvitie (Kupari, Vaakanainen) (EA) – 02:55	2–0
Talvitie (Kupari, Heponiemi) – 05:53	3–0
Jokiharju (Heponiemi, Puustinen (PP) – 07:43	4–0
	4–1	16:40 – Kurashev (Leuenberger, Müller)
Heponiemi (Tolvanen, Lundell) (EA) – 27:56	5–1
Kupari (Kakko, Heponiemi) (PP) – 34:57	6–1

6 min
Penalties
12 min
33
Shots
17

==== Bronze medal game ====
5 January 2019; 13:00	Russia	5–2 (2–0, 1–2, 2–0)	Switzerland	Rogers Arena, Vancouver; Attendance: 12,025

Game reference

Pyotr Kochetkov
Goalies
Luca Hollenstein
Referees:
(Canada) Jonathan Alaire
(Sweden) Tobias Björk
Linesmen:
(Czech Republic) Daniel Hynek
(United States) Brian Oliver

Slepets (Iv. Morozov, Il. Morozov) – 04:25	1–0
Shashkov (Podkolzin) – 13:44	2–0
	2–1	24:54 – Nussbaumer (Le Coultre, Sigrist)
Kostin (Denisenko, Romanov) – 32:53	3–1
	3–2	35:36 – Bruschweiler (Sigrist, Gross)
Slepets – 46:33	4–2
Slepets (Galimov, Kochetkov) (SH, ENG) – 57:59	5–2

14 min
Penalties
6 min
24
Shots
36

==== Final ====
5 January 2019; 17:00	United States	2–3 (0–0, 0–1, 2–2)	Finland	Rogers Arena, Vancouver; Attendance: 17,206

Game reference

Cayden Primeau
Goalies
Ukko-Pekka Luukkonen
Referees:
(Czech Republic) Daniel Pražák
(Russia) Yevgeni Romasko
Linesmen:
(Canada) Maxime Chaput
(Sweden) Emil Yletyinen

	0–1	31:31 – Ylönen (Laaksonen, Puustinen) (PP)
	0–2	46:00 – Latvala (Heponiemi, Kupari)
Chmelevski (J. Hughes, Cates) – 47:01	1–2
Norris (Chmelevski, Cates) – 48:47	2–2
	2–3	58:34 – Kakko (Lundell, Jokiharju)

6 min
Penalties
10 min
28
Shots
31

=== Statistics ===
==== Scoring leaders ====
Pos	Player	Country	GP	G	A	Pts	+/−	PIM
1	Grigori Denisenko	Russia	7	4	5	9	+3	4
2	Aleksi Heponiemi	Finland	7	3	6	9	+7	4
3	Artur Gatiyatov	Kazakhstan	6	5	3	8	0	0
4	Ryan Poehling	United States	7	5	3	8	+5	2
5	Morgan Frost	Canada	5	4	4	8	+8	12
6	Alexander Romanov	Russia	7	1	7	8	+12	0
7	Philipp Kurashev	Switzerland	7	6	1	7	-5	4
8	Kirill Slepets	Russia	7	5	2	7	+7	4
9	Alexander Chmelevski	United States	7	4	3	7	0	2
9	Aarne Talvitie	Finland	7	4	3	7	+9	14

GP = Games played; G = Goals; A = Assists; Pts = Points; +/− = Plus–minus; PIM = Penalties In Minutes
Source: IIHF

==== Goaltending leaders ====
(minimum 40% team's total ice time)

Pos	Player	Country	TOI	GA	GAA	SA	Sv%	SO
1	Lukáš Dostál	Czech Republic	239:10	5	1.25	115	95.65	1
2	Pyotr Kochetkov	Russia	290:31	7	1.45	149	95.30	0
3	Michael DiPietro	Canada	243:16	5	1.23	103	95.15	1
4	Cayden Primeau	United States	298:55	8	1.61	126	93.65	0
5	Ukko-Pekka Luukkonen	Finland	367:16	11	1.80	162	93.21	0

TOI = Time On Ice (minutes:seconds); GA = Goals against; GAA = Goals against average; SA = Shots against; Sv% = Save percentage; SO = Shutouts
Source: IIHF

=== Awards ===
- Best players selected by the directorate:
  - Best Goaltender: (Russia) Pyotr Kochetkov
  - Best Defenceman: (Russia) Alexander Romanov
  - Best Forward: (United States) Ryan Poehling

Source: IIHF

- Media All-Stars:
  - MVP: (United States) Ryan Poehling
  - Goaltender: (Finland) Ukko-Pekka Luukkonen
  - Defencemen: (Russia) Alexander Romanov / (Sweden) Erik Brännström
  - Forwards: (Russia) Grigori Denisenko / (Switzerland) Philipp Kurashev / (United States) Ryan Poehling

Source: IIHF

=== Final standings ===
Pos	Grp	Team	Pld	W	OTW	OTL	L	GF	GA	GD	Pts	Final result
1	B	Finland	7	4	1	0	2	23	11	+12	14	Champions
2	B	United States	7	5	0	1	1	25	14	+11	16	Runners-up
3	A	Russia	7	6	0	0	1	29	13	+16	18	Third place
4	A	Switzerland	7	2	0	1	4	16	23	−7	7	Fourth place
5	B	Sweden	5	3	1	0	1	16	10	+6	11	Eliminated in Quarter-finals
6	A	Canada (H)	5	3	0	1	1	24	7	+17	10	Eliminated in Quarter-finals
7	A	Czech Republic	5	1	1	0	3	9	11	−2	5	Eliminated in Quarter-finals
8	B	Slovakia	5	1	0	0	4	18	22	−4	3	Eliminated in Quarter-finals
9	B	Kazakhstan	6	2	0	0	4	13	31	−18	6	Avoided relegation
10	A	Denmark	6	0	0	0	6	3	34	−31	0	Relegated to the 2020 Division I A

Updated to match(es) played on completed. Source: IIHF
(H) Host

== Division I ==
=== Group A ===
The Division I Group A tournament was played in Füssen, Germany, from December 9 to 15, 2018.

Pos	Team	Pld	W	OTW	OTL	L	GF	GA	GD	Pts	Promotion or relegation
1	Germany (H)	5	4	1	0	0	22	5	+17	14	Promoted to the 2020 Top Division
2	Belarus	5	3	0	0	2	18	13	+5	9	
3	Norway	5	2	1	0	2	15	13	+2	8	
4	Latvia	5	2	0	0	3	11	13	−2	6	
5	Austria	5	1	0	2	2	9	17	−8	5	
6	France	5	1	0	0	4	8	22	−14	3	Relegated to the 2020 Division I B

Source: IIHF
Rules for classification: 1) points; 2) head-to-head points; 3) head-to-head goal difference; 4) head-to-head number of goals scored; 5) result against closest best-ranked team outside tied teams; 6) result against second-best ranked team outside tied teams; 7) seeding before tournament.
(H) Host

=== Group B ===
The Division I Group B tournament was played in Tychy, Poland, from December 8 to 14, 2018.

Pos	Team	Pld	W	OTW	OTL	L	GF	GA	GD	Pts	Promotion or relegation
1	Slovenia	5	3	2	0	0	21	11	+10	13	Promoted to the 2020 Division I A
2	Poland (H)	5	3	0	1	1	19	15	+4	10 (Note: Hungary 2–4 Poland)	
3	Hungary	5	3	0	1	1	24	15	+9	10	
4	Italy	5	1	1	1	2	10	15	−5	6	
5	Ukraine	5	1	1	0	3	14	20	−6	5	
6	Japan	5	0	0	1	4	13	25	−12	1	Relegated to the 2020 Division II A

Source: IIHF
Rules for classification: 1) points; 2) head-to-head points; 3) head-to-head goal difference; 4) head-to-head number of goals scored; 5) result against closest best-ranked team outside tied teams; 6) result against second-best ranked team outside tied teams; 7) seeding before tournament.
(H) Host

== Division II ==
=== Group A ===
The Division II Group A tournament was played in Tallinn, Estonia, from January 13 to 19, 2019.

Pos	Team	Pld	W	OTW	OTL	L	GF	GA	GD	Pts	Promotion or relegation
1	Estonia (H)	5	4	1	0	0	25	7	+18	14	Promoted to the 2020 Division I B
2	Lithuania	5	3	0	2	0	22	12	+10	11	
3	Great Britain	5	3	0	0	2	30	16	+14	9	
4	Romania	5	1	2	0	2	13	20	−7	7	
5	Spain	5	1	0	0	4	8	18	−10	3	
6	South Korea	5	0	0	1	4	7	32	−25	1	Relegated to the 2020 Division II B

Source: IIHF
Rules for classification: 1) points; 2) head-to-head points; 3) head-to-head goal difference; 4) head-to-head number of goals scored; 5) result against closest best-ranked team outside tied teams; 6) result against second-best ranked team outside tied teams; 7) seeding before tournament.
(H) Host

=== Group B ===
The Division II Group B tournament was played in Zagreb, Croatia, from January 15 to 21, 2019.

Pos	Team	Pld	W	OTW	OTL	L	GF	GA	GD	Pts	Promotion or relegation
1	Serbia	5	5	0	0	0	26	5	+21	15	Promoted to the 2020 Division II A
2	Croatia (H)	5	4	0	0	1	18	9	+9	12	
3	Netherlands	5	3	0	0	2	25	22	+3	9	
4	Belgium	5	2	0	0	3	22	24	−2	6	
5	Israel	5	1	0	0	4	12	21	−9	3	
6	Mexico	5	0	0	0	5	6	28	−22	0	Relegated to the 2020 Division III

Source: IIHF
Rules for classification: 1) points; 2) head-to-head points; 3) head-to-head goal difference; 4) head-to-head number of goals scored; 5) result against closest best-ranked team outside tied teams; 6) result against second-best ranked team outside tied teams; 7) seeding before tournament.
(H) Host

== Division III ==
The Division III tournament was played in Reykjavík, Iceland, from January 14 to 20, 2019.

=== Playoffs ===
Semifinals
1A	Australia	7
2B	Bulgaria	4
1B	China	12
2A	Turkey	1

Final
1A	Australia	1
1B	China	5
3rd place game
2B	Bulgaria	0
2A	Turkey	6

5th–8th place semifinals
3A	Iceland	11
4B	New Zealand	1
3B	South Africa	1
4A	Chinese Taipei	7

5th place game
3A	Iceland	5
4A	Chinese Taipei	3
7th place game
3B	South Africa	5
4B	New Zealand	3
