= Tyler Madden =

American ice hockey player (born 1999)

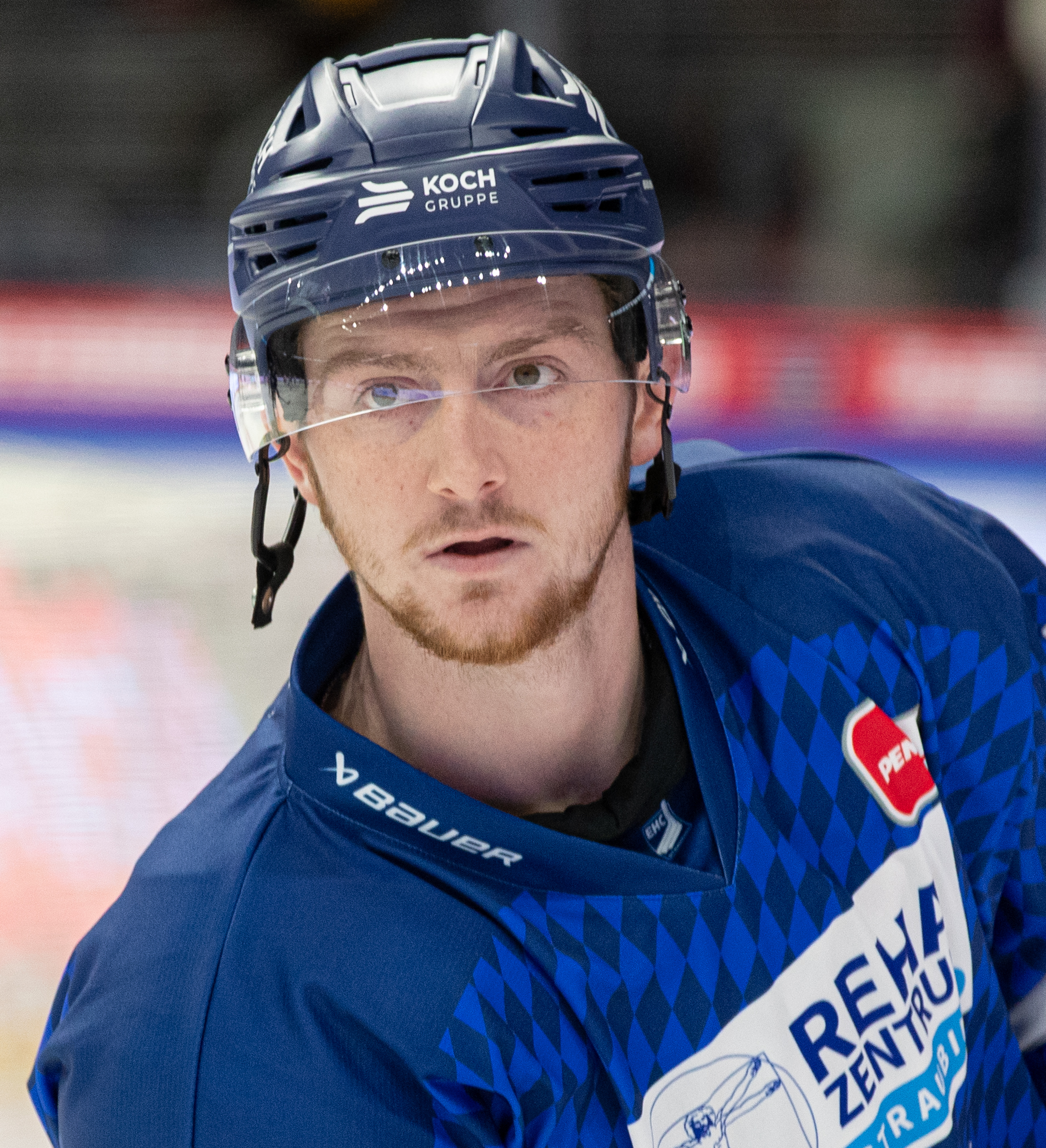
- Madden with Straubing in 2025
- Born: November 9, 1999 (age 26) Albany, New York, U.S.
- Height: 5 ft 11 in (180 cm)
- Weight: 170 lb (77 kg; 12 st 2 lb)
- Position: Center
- Shoots: Right
- DEL team Former teams: Straubing Tigers; Ontario Reign; Iowa Wild
- NHL draft: 68th overall, 2018; Vancouver Canucks
- Playing career: 2021–present

John Tyler Madden (born November 9, 1999) is an American professional ice hockey center who currently plays for the Straubing Tigers in the Deutsche Eishockey Liga (DEL). He was originally drafted 68th overall by the Vancouver Canucks in the 2018 NHL entry draft.

== Playing career ==
On February 17, 2020, the Vancouver Canucks traded Madden's rights to the Los Angeles Kings, along with Tim Schaller, a second-round pick in 2020, and a conditional fourth-round pick in 2022, in exchange for Tyler Toffoli. Shortly after, on March 30, 2020, Madden signed a three-year entry-level contract with the Kings, choosing to forgo his remaining two years of college eligibility.

Due to the delayed start of the 2020–21 North American hockey season caused by the COVID-19 pandemic, many NHL and AHL teams arranged for their prospects to gain playing time overseas. As part of this strategy, Madden was temporarily loaned to Eisbären Berlin, a prominent team in Germany's Deutsche Eishockey Liga (DEL), to continue his development and stay in game shape. However, before Madden could suit up for a game with Berlin, he was recalled by his NHL organization after sustaining an injury.

In his fifth season with the Ontario Reign during the 2024–25 campaign, Madden's time with the Los Angeles Kings organization came to an end when he was traded to the Minnesota Wild in exchange for Joseph Cecconi on February 26, 2025.

As a free agent at the conclusion of his contract with the Wild, Madden left North America and was signed to a one-year contract with German club, Straubing Tigers of the DEL, on July 11, 2025.

== Personal life ==
Madden is the son of former NHL player John Madden, who spent 13 seasons in the league, primarily with the New Jersey Devils. He was born in Albany during the time his father played for the Albany River Rats in the American Hockey League.

== Career statistics ==
=== Regular season and playoffs ===
			Regular season					Playoffs
Season	Team	League	GP	G	A	Pts	PIM	GP	G	A	Pts	PIM
2017–18	Central Illinois Flying Aces	USHL	18	6	8	14	20	—	—	—	—	—
2017–18	Tri-City Storm	USHL	32	9	11	20	24	—	—	—	—	—
2018–19	Northeastern University	HE	36	12	16	28	8	—	—	—	—	—
2019–20	Northeastern University	HE	27	19	18	37	34	—	—	—	—	—
2020–21	Ontario Reign	AHL	14	1	4	5	2	1	0	0	0	0
2021–22	Ontario Reign	AHL	48	14	17	31	12	3	0	0	0	0
2022–23	Ontario Reign	AHL	71	20	13	33	12	2	0	0	0	0
2023–24	Ontario Reign	AHL	71	15	19	34	16	8	5	2	7	0
2024–25	Ontario Reign	AHL	47	8	17	25	12	—	—	—	—	—
2024–25	Iowa Wild	AHL	20	2	8	10	4	—	—	—	—	—
2025–26	Straubing Tigers	DEL	39	20	18	38	4	6	2	1	3	2
AHL totals			271	60	78	138	58	14	5	2	7	0

Medal record

Representing United States

Ice hockey

World Junior Championships
Silver medal – second place	2019 Canada	

=== International ===
Year	Team	Event	Result	GP	G	A	Pts	PIM
2019	United States	WJC	2nd place, silver medalist(s)	7	3	1	4	2
Junior totals				7	3	1	4	2

== Awards and honors ==
Award	Year	Ref
College
HE All-Rookie Team	2018–19	
AHCA Second Team All-American	2019–20	
HE First All-Star Team	2019–20	
