= Henri Jokiharju =

Finnish ice hockey player (born 1999)

- Born: 17 June 1999 (age 27) Oulu, Finland
- Height: 6 ft 0 in (183 cm)
- Weight: 205 lb (93 kg; 14 st 9 lb)
- Position: Defence
- Shoots: Right
- NHL team (P) Cur. team Former teams: Boston Bruins; Providence Bruins (AHL); Chicago Blackhawks; Buffalo Sabres
- National team: Finland
- NHL draft: 29th overall, 2017; Chicago Blackhawks
- Playing career: 2018–present

Henri Jokiharju (born 17 June 1999) is a Finnish professional ice hockey player who is a defenceman for the Providence Bruins in the American Hockey League (AHL) while under contract to the Boston Bruins of the National Hockey League (NHL). Jokiharju was selected 29th overall by the Chicago Blackhawks in the first round of the 2017 NHL entry draft.

== Playing career ==
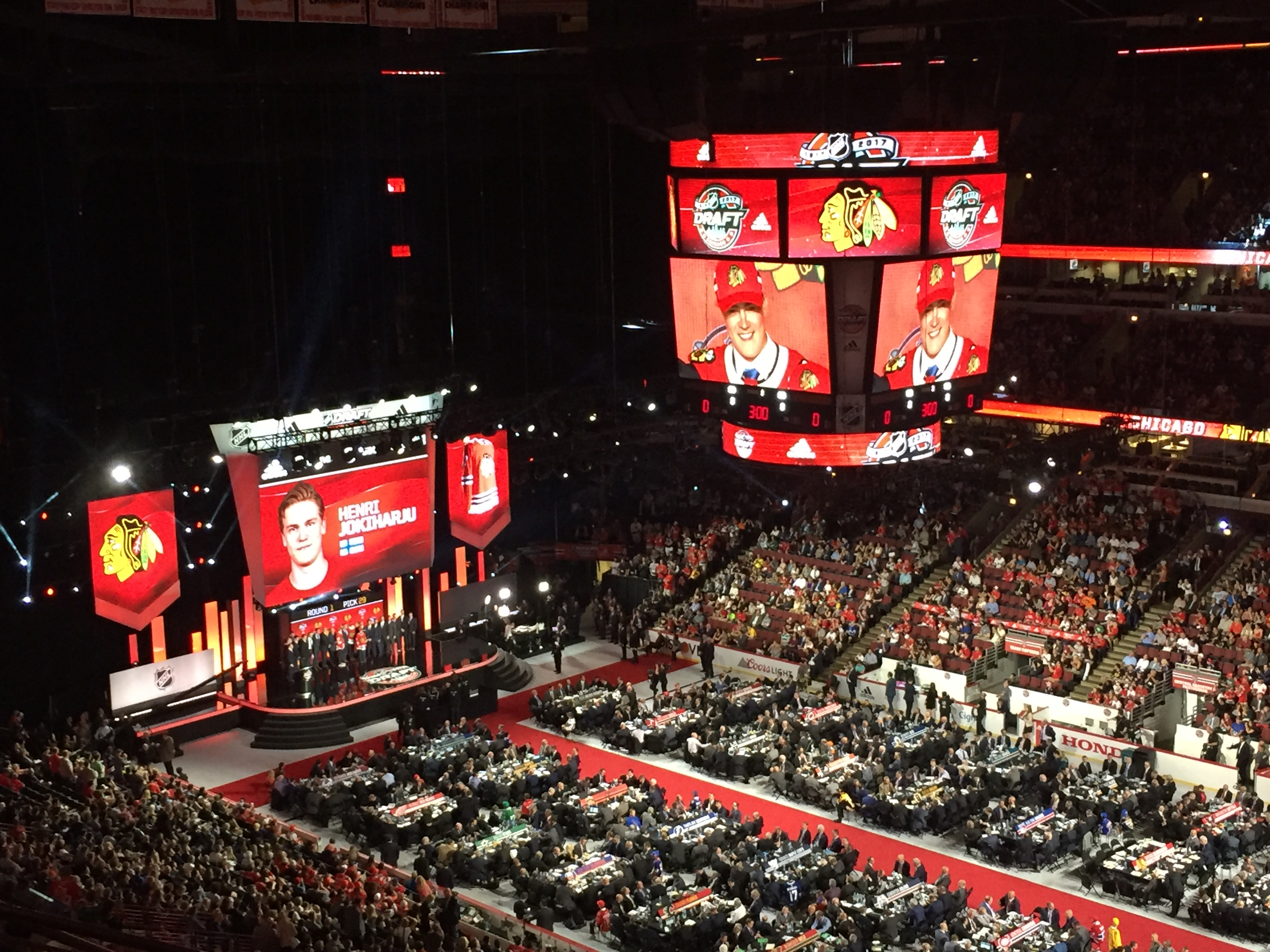
Selected by the Blackhawks at the 2017 NHL entry draft

Jokiharju was brought up first in the Jokerit youth program, playing for their under-16 and under-18 teams in 2013–14 and 2014–15, respectively, before joining the under-18 and under-20 teams of Tappara in 2015–16. In his draft eligible year, 2016–17, Jokiharju went to play for the Portland Winterhawks of the Western Hockey League (WHL). He posted nine goals and 39 assists in 71 games for a total of 48 points. In the playoffs, the Winterhawks defeated the Prince George Cougars in six games before dropping out in five to the Kelowna Rockets, with Jokiharju adding three assists in 11 games during the playoff run. Jokiharju was named to the Western Conference Second-Team All-Star during the 2017–18 season.

On 12 June 2018, Jokiharju signed a three-year contract with the Chicago Blackhawks. After participating at the Blackhawks training camp, Jokiharju made his NHL debut on 4 October in the Blackhawks' season opener against the Ottawa Senators. In his second game, Jokiharju recorded his first NHL point with an assist on captain Jonathan Toews' goal in a 5–4 overtime win over the St. Louis Blues.

On 9 July 2019, Jokiharju was traded by the Blackhawks to the Buffalo Sabres in exchange for fellow first-rounder, Alexander Nylander. On 1 November 2019, Jokiharju scored his first career goal against the Washington Capitals. On 2 September 2021, Jokiharju was re-signed a three-year, $7.5 million contract with the Sabres.

During the 2024–25 season, with the Sabres familiarly out of playoff contention and as a pending free agent, Jokiharju was dealt at the NHL trade deadline to the Boston Bruins in exchange for a fourth-round pick in 2026 on 7 March 2025.

== Personal life ==
Both his father and brother also play ice hockey. His father Juha, played professionally, mainly in the Finnish SM-liiga, while his older brother Juho, played college ice hockey at Clarkson University from 2015 to 2019.

== Career statistics ==
=== Regular season and playoffs ===
			Regular season					Playoffs
Season	Team	League	GP	G	A	Pts	PIM	GP	G	A	Pts	PIM
2014–15	Jokerit	FIN U18	37	8	22	30	6	10	4	2	6	2
2015–16	Tappara	FIN U18	—	—	—	—	—	3	0	2	2	10
2015–16	Tappara	FIN U20	47	9	20	29	20	3	1	2	3	4
2016–17	Portland Winterhawks	WHL	71	9	39	48	38	11	0	3	3	4
2017–18	Portland Winterhawks	WHL	63	12	59	71	14	12	3	5	8	2
2018–19	Chicago Blackhawks	NHL	38	0	12	12	16	—	—	—	—	—
2018–19	Rockford IceHogs	AHL	30	2	15	17	14	—	—	—	—	—
2019–20	Buffalo Sabres	NHL	69	4	11	15	32	—	—	—	—	—
2020–21	Buffalo Sabres	NHL	46	3	5	8	4	—	—	—	—	—
2021–22	Buffalo Sabres	NHL	60	3	16	19	20	—	—	—	—	—
2022–23	Buffalo Sabres	NHL	60	3	10	13	30	—	—	—	—	—
2023–24	Buffalo Sabres	NHL	74	3	17	20	24	—	—	—	—	—
2024–25	Buffalo Sabres	NHL	42	3	3	6	12	—	—	—	—	—
2024–25	Boston Bruins	NHL	18	0	4	4	2	—	—	—	—	—
2025–26	Boston Bruins	NHL	41	2	13	15	14	2	0	0	0	0
NHL totals			448	21	91	112	154	2	0	0	0	0

=== International ===
Medal record

Men's ice hockey

Representing Finland

Winter Olympics
Bronze medal – third place	2026 Milano Cortina	

World Championships
Gold medal – first place	2019 Slovakia	
Gold medal – first place	2026 Switzerland	

World Junior Championships
Gold medal – first place	2019 Canada	

IIHF World U18 Championship
Gold medal – first place	2016 United States	

Year	Team	Event	Result	GP	G	A	Pts	PIM
2015	Finland	IH18	4th	5	0	2	2	0
2015	Finland	U17	5th	5	1	0	1	2
2016	Finland	WJC18	1st place, gold medalist(s)	7	0	3	3	10
2018	Finland	WJC	6th	5	2	2	4	2
2019	Finland	WJC	1st place, gold medalist(s)	7	2	3	5	2
2019	Finland	WC	1st place, gold medalist(s)	10	0	3	3	2
2025	Finland	4NF	4th	3	1	0	1	0
2026	Finland	OG	3rd place, bronze medalist(s)	6	0	1	1	0
2026	Finland	WC	1st place, gold medalist(s)	10	2	6	8	6
Junior totals				29	5	10	15	16
Senior totals				29	3	10	13	8

== Awards and honours ==
Award	Year	Ref
WHL
WHL West Second All-Star Team	2018	
International
World Championship All-Star Team	2026	
World Championship Top 3 Player on Team	2026	

Awards and achievements
Preceded by Nick Schmaltz	Chicago Blackhawks first-round draft pick 2017	Succeeded by Adam Boqvist
