= Pyotr Kochetkov =

Russian ice hockey player (born 1999)

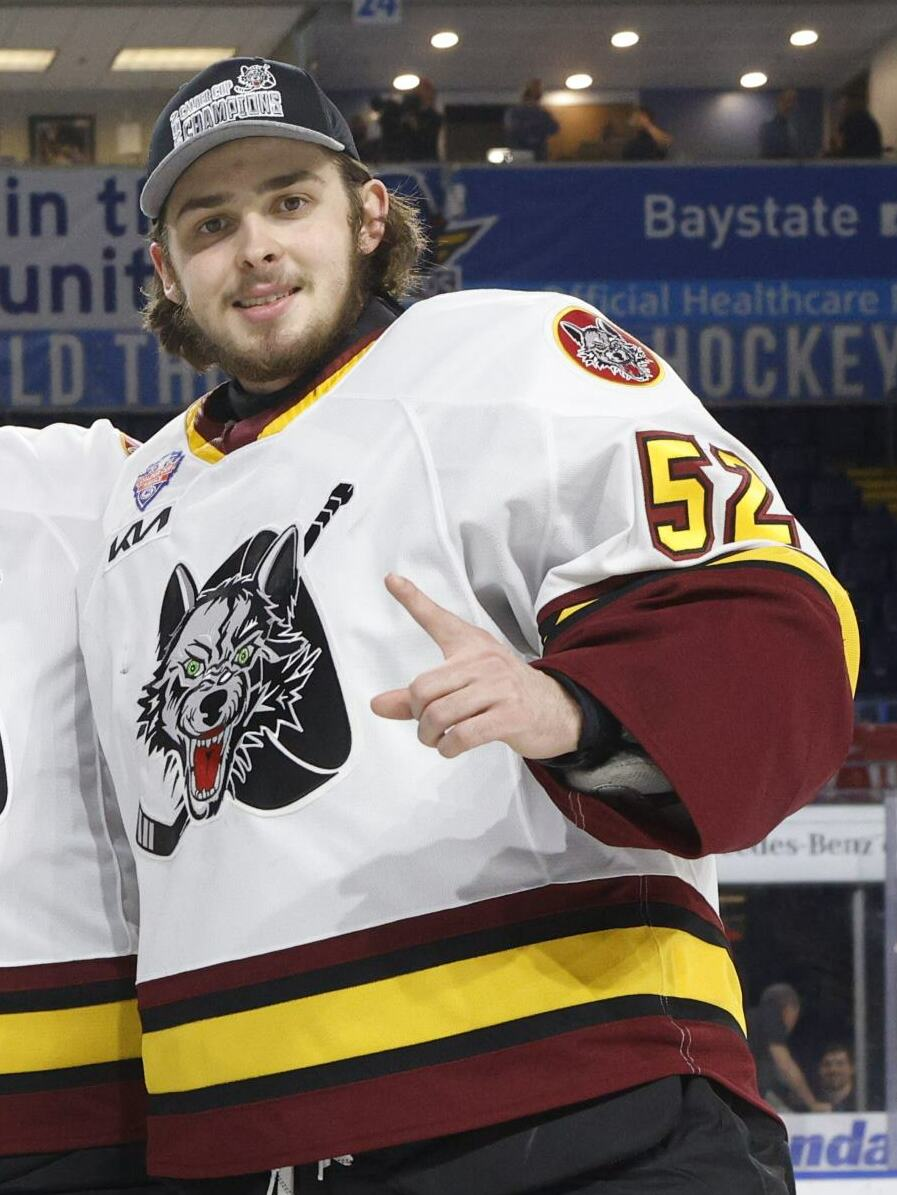
- Kochetkov with the Chicago Wolves in 2022
- Born: 25 June 1999 (age 27) Penza, Russia
- Height: 6 ft 3 in (191 cm)
- Weight: 196 lb (89 kg; 14 st 0 lb)
- Position: Goaltender
- Catches: Left
- NHL team Former teams: Carolina Hurricanes; HC Sochi; SKA Saint Petersburg; HC Vityaz; Torpedo Nizhny Novgorod
- NHL draft: 36th overall, 2019; Carolina Hurricanes
- Playing career: 2016–present

Pyotr Anatolevich Kochetkov (Russian: Пётр Анато́льевич Кочетко́в; born 25 June 1999) is a Russian professional ice hockey player who is a goaltender for the Carolina Hurricanes of the National Hockey League (NHL). He was ranked as the top eligible international goaltender for the 2019 NHL entry draft, and was drafted in the second round (36th overall) by the Hurricanes. He debuted in 2022 with the Hurricanes and won the Stanley Cup in 2026 with them.

== Playing career ==
Kochetkov first played as a youth within hometown club Dizel Penza. While with the Dizel Sports Academy, Kochetkov helped the claim the Volga region championship in 2011. With the ambition to play in the MHL, Kochetkov joined Ak Bars Kazan under-18 junior program for the 2015–16 season, however received sparse playing time, resulting in his return to Dizel Penza of the Supreme Hockey League (VHL) prior to the 2016–17 season as a 17-year old.

He played with junior affiliate, the Dizelist Penza of the National Junior Hockey League (NMHL), before making his professional debut with Penza, playing in relief and registering five saves in a 6–1 victory over Yermak Angarsk on 7 November 2016. Kochetkov made 8 appearances over the course of the season, earning his first victory in his third and final start, in a 4–2 decision over Ariada Volzhsk on 11 January 2017.

On 8 July 2017, Kochetkov agreed to his first KHL contract, signing a two-year deal with HC Sochi. He was assigned for the duration of the 2017–18 season to play with junior farm club, Kapitan Stupino. With Kapitan lacking in depth, Kochetkov posted just six wins in 31 games, while still posting a .917 save percentage.

In the 2018–19 season, Kochetkov returned to the VHL, joining Sochi's affiliate HC Ryazan. He was elevated to practice with Sochi throughout the season, and made his KHL debut as a 19-year old for Sochi in a 4–2 defeat to Jokerit on 1 October 2018. He made one other appearance with Sochi throughout the season, returning to the VHL to help lead Ryazan in the postseason.

On 21 May 2019, Kochetkov was traded by Sochi to contending club, SKA Saint Petersburg, in exchange for fellow goaltender Nikita Bogdanov. In the 2019–20 season, Kochetkov remained on the opening night roster and started in the opening 5 games. After an assignment to SKA-Neva in the VHL, Kochetkov returned to SKA and having collected 3 wins in 6 games was traded to his third KHL club, HC Vityaz, along with Alexei Byvaltsev in exchange for Alexander Samonov and Artyom Shvets-Rogovoy on 18 October 2019. He made his debut with Vityaz in a 4–1 defeat to Sibir Novosibirsk on 22 October 2019. In 8 games with Vityaz, as the club's third choice goaltender, Kochetkov collected 1 win while posting a .917 save percentage.

In the following 2020–21 season, Kochetkov made two starts in four winless appearances with Vityaz, before he was assigned to VHL affiliate club and former team, HC Ryazan. Registering one win through five games with Ryazan, Kochetkov was traded at the deadline by Vityaz to Torpdeo Nizhny Novgorod on 27 December 2020.

On 2 May 2021, Kochetkov was signed by his draft club, the Carolina Hurricanes, to a two-year, entry-level contract. He made his NHL debut on 23 April 2022, starting for the Hurricanes and earning two wins in two victories in a row over the New Jersey Devils and New York Islanders.

On 4 May 2022, Kochetkov made his NHL playoff debut for the Hurricanes coming on in relief of an injured Antti Raanta in game two of the first round series between the Hurricanes and the Boston Bruins. Kochetkov had 30 saves and recorded a 5–2 win. On 25 June 2022, he won the Calder Cup with the Chicago Wolves.

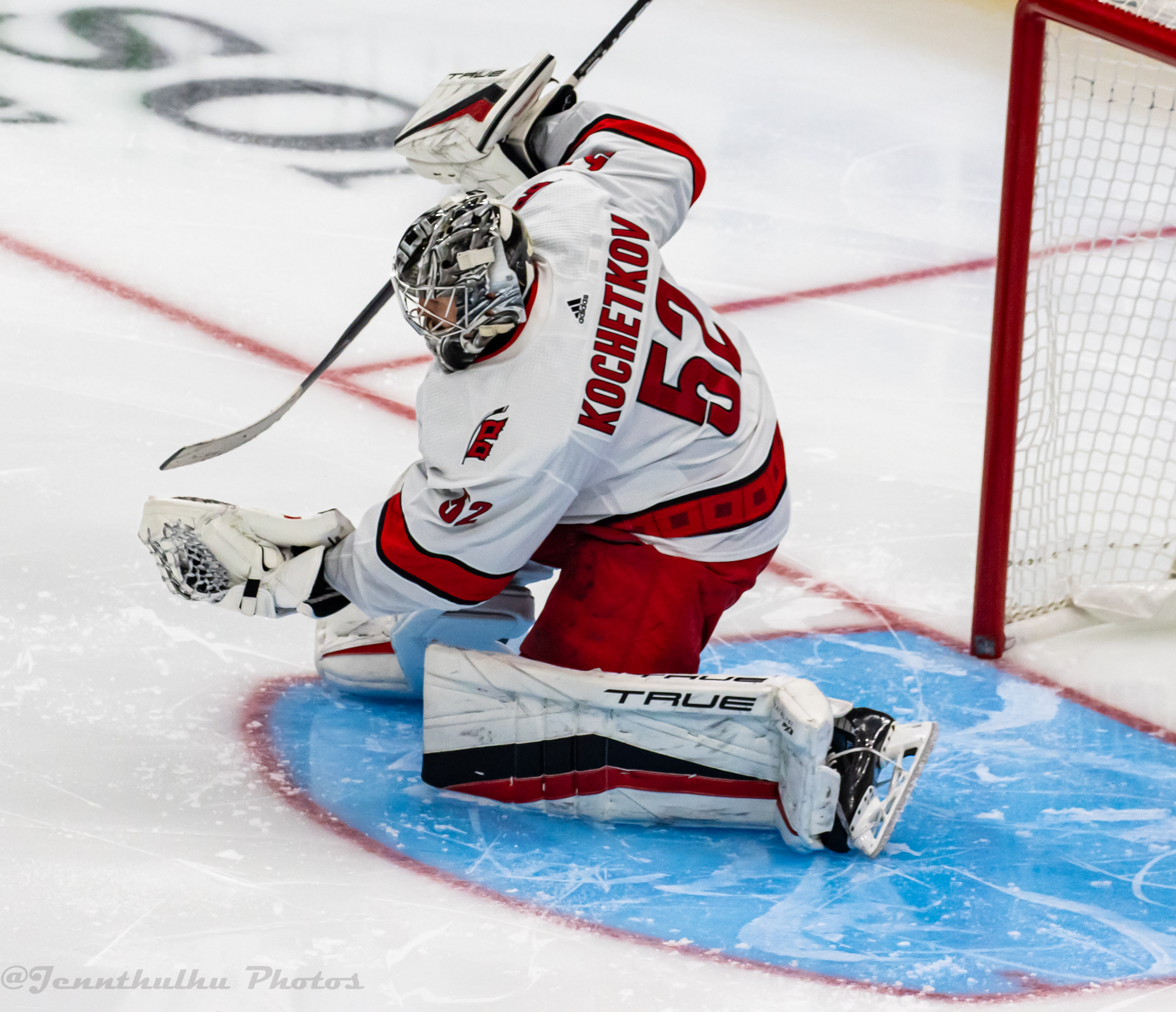
Kochetkov in action for the Hurricanes in October 2023

On 14 November 2022, Kochetkov recorded his first NHL shutout in 3–0 win over the Chicago Blackhawks. On 23 November, Kochetkov was signed to a four-year extension until 2026–27. On 3 March 2023, playing for the AHL's Chicago Wolves, Kochetkov scored a long-distance goal against the Manitoba Moose in Winnipeg. Played from behind the net, the high-arching puck flew across the ice, sliding into the opposite goal.

After spending the 2024–25 NHL season as Carolina's primary back-up goaltender, Kochetkov spent the beginning of the 2025–26 NHL season as the third goaltender in a three goalie rotation behind Brandon Bussi and Frederik Andersen until an injury which required surgery in December 2025 caused him to miss the second half of the season. Kochetkov returned from surgery near the end of the regular season and played a few conditioning games with the Chicago Wolves, before returning the Hurricanes for the 2026 Stanley Cup playoffs; Kotchetkov was meant to start the final game of the Hurricanes' regular season, but roster technicalities prevented him from playing and forced the Hurricanes to activate an emergency back-up goaltender. Kotchetkov then served again as Carolina's #3 goaltender for their 2026 playoff run, briefly returning to the #2 spot to back up Bussi during the 2026 Stanley Cup Finals after an injury to Andersen; Kochetkov did not play during the playoffs but won a Stanley Cup with the Hurricanes.

In the 2026–27 NHL season, Kochetkov started the season with 10 consecutive wins, setting a Hurricanes franchise record for most consecutive wins and only the third NHL goaltender to start a season 10-0.

== International play ==
Medal record

Representing Russia

Ice hockey

World Junior Championships
Bronze medal – third place	2019 Canada	

Kochetkov first represented Russia at the junior level for the 2019 World Junior Championships in Vancouver, Canada. Earning the starting goaltender role, he collected 4 wins in 5 games, helping Russia claim the Bronze medal against Switzerland on 6 January 2019. As the standout goaltender of the Tournament, Kochetkov was recognized with the Best Goaltender award.

== Career statistics ==
=== Regular season and playoffs ===
			Regular season									Playoffs
Season	Team	League	GP	W	L	OTL	MIN	GA	SO	GAA	SV%	GP	W	L	MIN	GA	SO	GAA	SV%
2016–17	Dizelist Penza	NMHL	6	4	2	0	326	9	1	1.66	.915	8	4	4	419	16	1	2.29	.923
2016–17	Dizel Penza	VHL	8	1	2	0	212	8	0	2.27	.918	—	—	—	—	—	—	—	—
2017–18	Kapitan Stupino	MHL	31	6	21	3	1830	100	0	3.28	.917	—	—	—	—	—	—	—	—
2018–19	HC Ryazan	VHL	18	8	7	3	985	35	2	2.13	.930	3	0	3	187	5	0	1.61	.955
2018–19	HC Sochi	KHL	2	0	2	0	117	5	0	2.57	.911	—	—	—	—	—	—	—	—
2019–20	SKA Saint Petersburg	KHL	6	3	3	0	344	15	0	2.62	.887	—	—	—	—	—	—	—	—
2019–20	SKA-Neva	VHL	2	1	1	0	123	4	0	1.95	.940	—	—	—	—	—	—	—	—
2019–20	HC Vityaz	KHL	8	1	5	0	330	17	0	3.09	.917	—	—	—	—	—	—	—	—
2019–20	Russkie Vityazi	MHL	2	1	1	0	120	7	0	3.50	.908	—	—	—	—	—	—	—	—
2020–21	HC Vityaz	KHL	4	0	3	0	179	8	0	2.69	.909	—	—	—	—	—	—	—	—
2020–21	HC Ryazan	VHL	5	1	3	1	268	11	0	2.46	.904	—	—	—	—	—	—	—	—
2020–21	Torpedo Nizhny Novgorod	KHL	6	2	2	1	342	15	1	2.63	.961	2	0	1	97	4	0	2.48	.932
2021–22	Torpedo Nizhny Novgorod	KHL	23	10	10	2	1321	49	2	2.23	.926	—	—	—	—	—	—	—	—
2021–22	Chicago Wolves	AHL	15	13	1	1	890	31	0	2.09	.921	6	5	1	364	10	2	1.65	.950
2021–22	Carolina Hurricanes	NHL	3	3	0	0	149	6	0	2.42	.902	4	1	2	170	11	0	3.89	.869
2022–23	Chicago Wolves	AHL	26	17	6	3	1571	69	2	2.64	.903	—	—	—	—	—	—	—	—
2022–23	Carolina Hurricanes	NHL	24	12	7	5	1404	57	4	2.44	.909	1	0	1	39	4	0	6.14	.818
2023–24	Syracuse Crunch	AHL	3	3	0	0	185	5	1	1.63	.932	—	—	—	—	—	—	—	—
2023–24	Carolina Hurricanes	NHL	42	23	13	4	2371	92	4	2.33	.911	1	0	1	61	3	0	2.96	.880
2024–25	Carolina Hurricanes	NHL	47	27	16	3	2791	121	2	2.60	.897	4	1	1	200	12	0	3.60	.855
2025–26	Carolina Hurricanes	NHL	9	6	2	0	490	19	1	2.33	.899	—	—	—	—	—	—	—	—
2025–26	Chicago Wolves	AHL	3	1	0	0	120	3	0	1.50	.940	—	—	—	—	—	—	—	—
KHL totals			49	16	25	3	2,632	109	3	2.48	.920	2	0	1	97	4	0	2.48	.932
NHL totals			125	71	38	12	7,205	295	11	2.45	.904	10	2	5	470	30	0	3.83	.860

=== International ===
Year	Team	Event	Result	GP	W	L	T	MIN	GA	SO	GAA	SV%
2019	Russia	WJC	3rd place, bronze medalist(s)	5	4	1	0	291	7	0	1.45	.953
Junior totals				5	4	1	0	291	7	0	1.45	.953

== Awards and honours ==
Award	Year	Ref
AHL
Rookie of the Month (March 2022)	2022	
Calder Cup champion	2022	
NHL
NHL All-Rookie Team	2024	
Stanley Cup champion	2026	
International
WJC Best Goaltender (Directorate)	2019	
