= Alexander Romanov (ice hockey, born 2000) =

Russian ice hockey player (born 2000)

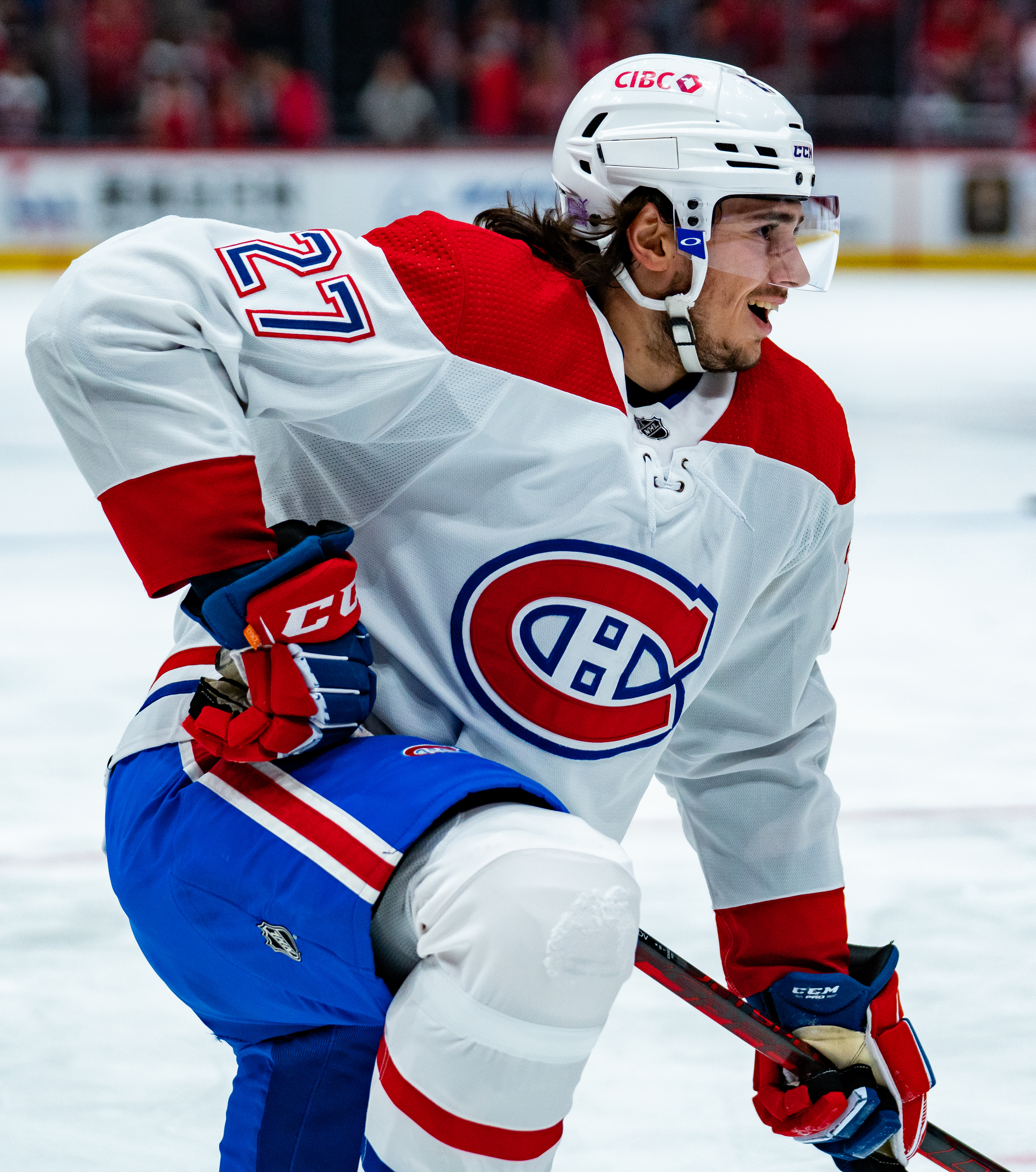
- Romanov with the Montreal Canadiens in 2021
- Born: 6 January 2000 (age 26) Moscow, Russia
- Height: 6 ft 0 in (183 cm)
- Weight: 208 lb (94 kg; 14 st 12 lb)
- Position: Defence
- Shoots: Left
- NHL team Former teams: New York Islanders; CSKA Moscow; Montreal Canadiens
- NHL draft: 38th overall, 2018; Montreal Canadiens
- Playing career: 2018–present

Alexander Stanislavovich Romanov (Russian: Александр Станиславович Романов; born 6 January 2000) is a Russian professional ice hockey player who is a defenceman for the New York Islanders of the National Hockey League (NHL). He was selected in the second round, 38th overall, by the Montreal Canadiens in the 2018 NHL entry draft.

== Playing career ==
After two seasons playing in the Kontinental Hockey League (KHL), Romanov was signed to a three-year, entry-level contract by the Montreal Canadiens on 13 July 2020. Making his debut with the team for the COVID-shortened 2020–21 season, Romanov played in 54 of 56 regular season games. However, he took to the ice in only four of the 22 games in the Canadiens' deep playoff run to the 2021 Stanley Cup Final. On 5 July 2021, he became the youngest defenceman in Canadiens history to score a goal in the Stanley Cup Final.

On 7 July 2022, during the 2022 NHL entry draft, Romanov was traded by the Canadiens, along with a fourth-round pick, to the New York Islanders in exchange for a first-round pick (13th overall). Canadiens general manager Kent Hughes said it was "very difficult" to trade Romanov, but that it was a necessary step in a series of trades to acquire centreman Kirby Dach from the Chicago Blackhawks.

On 1 July 2025, Romanov signed an eight-year, $50 million contract with the Islanders.

During the third period of a 5–2 loss to the New York Rangers on 6 October 2026, Romanov and Mika Zibanejad collided, and Romanov left the game with an apparent injury. The next day it was announced Romanov would be out from six to eight months with a torn ACL.

== International play ==
Medal record

Men's ice hockey

Representing Russia

World Junior Championships
Silver medal – second place	2020 Czech Republic	
Bronze medal – third place	2019 Canada	

Romanov represented Russia junior team at the 2019 World Junior Championships. He finished with one goal and seven assists, anchoring the Russian defence en route to a bronze medal. Romanov was named the best defenceman of the tournament by the IIHF Directorate and was voted to the All-Star team.

== Personal life ==
Romanov's maternal grandfather is Zinetula Bilyaletdinov, who played for the Soviet Union national team from 1974 to 1987 and coached the Russia men's team from 2011 to 2014. His father is former KHL player Stanislav Romanov.

In October 2020, Romanov married longtime girlfriend and former rhythmic gymnast Sofia Krasovskaya. Romanov and his wife have one daughter.

== Career statistics ==
=== Regular season and playoffs ===
			Regular season					Playoffs
Season	Team	League	GP	G	A	Pts	PIM	GP	G	A	Pts	PIM
2016–17	MHC Krylya Sovetov	MHL	15	1	2	3	2	—	—	—	—	—
2017–18	Krasnaya Armiya	MHL	37	7	7	14	37	—	—	—	—	—
2018–19	CSKA Moscow	KHL	43	1	3	4	12	4	0	0	0	2
2019–20	CSKA Moscow	KHL	43	0	7	7	14	4	0	0	0	0
2020–21	Montreal Canadiens	NHL	54	1	5	6	21	4	1	0	1	0
2021–22	Montreal Canadiens	NHL	79	3	10	13	53	—	—	—	—	—
2022–23	New York Islanders	NHL	76	2	20	22	43	4	0	0	0	2
2023–24	New York Islanders	NHL	81	7	15	22	20	5	0	1	1	0
2024–25	New York Islanders	NHL	64	4	16	20	20	—	—	—	—	—
2025–26	New York Islanders	NHL	15	0	1	1	6	—	—	—	—	—
KHL totals			86	1	10	11	26	8	0	0	0	2
NHL totals			369	17	67	84	163	13	1	1	2	2

=== International ===
Year	Team	Event	Result	GP	G	A	Pts	PIM
2018	Russia	U18	6th	5	1	2	3	0
2019	Russia	WJC	3rd place, bronze medalist(s)	7	1	7	8	0
2020	Russia	WJC	2nd place, silver medalist(s)	7	1	5	6	2
Junior totals				19	3	14	17	2

== Awards and honours ==
Award	Year	Ref
KHL
Gagarin Cup champion	2019	
International
WJC Best Defenceman (Directorate)	2019	
WJC Best Defenceman (Media All-Stars)	2019	
