= Alexander Alexeyev (ice hockey) =

Russian ice hockey player (born 1999)

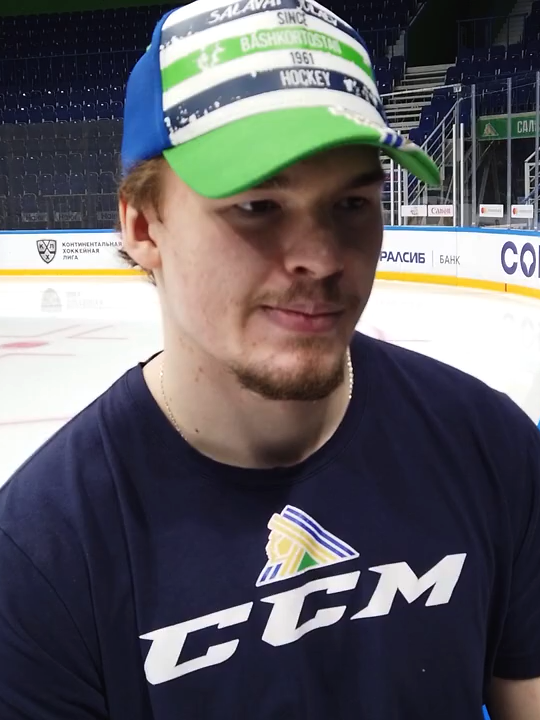
- Alexeyev in 2021
- Born: 15 November 1999 (age 27) Saint Petersburg, Russia
- Height: 6 ft 4 in (193 cm)
- Weight: 230 lb (104 kg; 16 st 6 lb)
- Position: Defence
- Shoots: Left
- KHL team Former teams: Salavat Yulaev Ufa; Washington Capitals
- NHL draft: 31st overall, 2018; Washington Capitals
- Playing career: 2019–present

Alexander Alexandrovich Alexeyev (Russian: Александр Александрович Алексеев; born 15 November 1999) is a Russian professional ice hockey defenceman for Salavat Yulaev Ufa of the Kontinental Hockey League (KHL). He was drafted 31st overall by the Washington Capitals in the 2018 NHL entry draft.

== Early life ==
Alexeyev was born on 15 November 1999 in Saint Petersburg, Russia.

== Playing career ==
=== Junior ===
Alexeyev was drafted in the first round, third overall, by the Metallurg Novokuznetsk in the 2016 Kontinental Hockey League draft. He was later selected by the Red Deer Rebels in the Canadian Hockey League Import Draft and chose to move to North America to play hockey.

Upon joining the Red Deer Rebels for the 2016–17 season, Alexeyev quickly began playing top minutes for the team. He was identified as a B prospect by Central Scouting in October and named as a prospect to watch for the 2018 NHL entry draft. Alexeyev was the most productive rookie on the team before he suffered an upper body injury in October. He subsequently missed nearly an entire month of games before returning on 22 November. He then suffered another injury in January and missed the remainder of the season while recovering from the surgery. During his time recovering, he also graduated from high school and worked on his English language skills. Prior to the injury, Alexeyev had tallied nine points through 10 games and ended with a total of 21 points in 41 games.

Alexeyev returned to the Rebels lineup for the 2017–18 season but missed significant time due to personal matters and a shoulder injury. He suffered the shoulder injury early in October and was quickly listed as week-to-week following an MRI. He returned to the Rebels lineup and broke out offensively, quickly surpassing his previous season's totals. However, his output slowed down when he missed three weeks of games due to his mother's death. As a result of another injury, Alexeyev was limited to three post-season games during the WHL playoffs but he tallied two goals and three assists during this time against the Lethbridge Hurricanes. Alexeyev finished the season with seven goals and 30 assists through 45 games but was wary of his draft position due to his missed time.

Leading up to the 2018 NHL Entry Draft, Alexeyev was ranked 30th amongst all eligible players by The Sports Network. He earned a higher ranking from the NHL Central Scouting Bureau, who listed him as 22nd overall after originally ranking him as 26th. Alexeyev drew comparisons to Jonas Brodin and was praised by Craig Button for being a "smart, effective defenceman who moves the puck, plays with a calm and doesn't make things complicated for himself." Alexeyev was eventually drafted by the Washington Capitals 31st overall, the final selection of the first round. Following the draft, Alexeyev signed a three-year, entry-level contract with the Capitals on 24 September.

Following the NHL Entry Draft, Alexeyev attended the Capitals training camp but was returned to the Rebels for the 2018–19 season. Upon re-joining the team, Alexeyev recorded eight points through four games and was named the WHL On the Run Player of the Week for the week ending on 28 October. His continued output help the team earn early success and placed first in the Central Division and second in the Eastern Conference. He was subsequently selected to play for Team Russia in the 2018 CHL Canada/Russia Series after he tallied 20 points through 15 games, including two power-play goals and two game-winning goals. Following the series, Alexeyev continued his breakout season by accumulating 10 goals and 43 points through 49 games before suffering another injury. The injury was a result of a knee-on-knee collision during a game and resulted in Alexeyev being stretchered off the ice. This subsequently concluded his major junior career as he missed the final four games of the regular season and four more in the playoffs. Alexeyev finished his Rebels career with 21 goals and 80 assists for 101 points through 135 games in three WHL seasons.

=== Professional ===
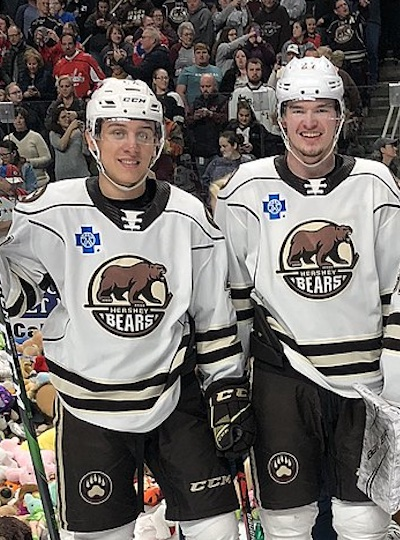
Martin Fehérváry (left) and Alexeyev (right) following the Hershey Bears' Teddy Bear Toss Game in 2019

Following his major junior season, Alexeyev rehabbed his knee off the ice with the Capitals American Hockey League (AHL) affiliate, the Hershey Bears. He then returned to his home in Russia before joining the Washington Capitals for their 2019 development camp. It was originally suggested that Alexeyev could replace Michal Kempný in the Capitals lineup before he suffered an injury during the NHL's Prospect Showcase. He was subsequently assigned to the Bears for the 2019–20 season where he scored his first professional goal in his AHL debut. Alexeyev then tallied a goal and nine assists through 23 games to start the season with Hershey. Making developmental strides he completed his rookie season with 3 goals and 21 points in 58 games with the Hershey Bears. Alexeyev ranked third among Hershey defensemen and 12th among all AHL rookie defensemen in points. Alexeyev led Hershey defensemen in games played and ranked third in plus/minus with +8.

With the following 2020–21 season set to be delayed due to the ongoing pandemic, Alexeyev remained in Russia and was loaned by the Capitals to KHL club, Salavat Yulaev Ufa, on 4 September 2020. Alexeyev made his NHL debut on 29 December 2021 in a 5–3 win over the Nashville Predators.

As a free agent following six seasons within the Capitals organization, Alexeyev was signed to a one-year, $775,000 contract with the Pittsburgh Penguins for the 2025–26 season on 2 July 2025.

== Career statistics ==
=== Regular season and playoffs ===
			Regular season					Playoffs
Season	Team	League	GP	G	A	Pts	PIM	GP	G	A	Pts	PIM
2015–16	SKA-Serebryanye Lvy	MHL	20	1	1	2	8	—	—	—	—	—
2016–17	Red Deer Rebels	WHL	41	4	17	21	24	—	—	—	—	—
2017–18	Red Deer Rebels	WHL	45	7	30	37	29	3	2	3	5	2
2018–19	Red Deer Rebels	WHL	49	10	33	43	34	—	—	—	—	—
2019–20	Hershey Bears	AHL	58	3	18	21	16	—	—	—	—	—
2020–21	Salavat Yulaev Ufa	KHL	55	8	8	16	10	9	0	1	1	4
2020–21	Hershey Bears	AHL	12	2	7	9	4	—	—	—	—	—
2021–22	Hershey Bears	AHL	68	1	18	19	51	3	0	1	1	0
2021–22	Washington Capitals	NHL	1	0	0	0	2	—	—	—	—	—
2022–23	Hershey Bears	AHL	4	0	1	1	0	—	—	—	—	—
2022–23	Washington Capitals	NHL	32	0	5	5	4	—	—	—	—	—
2023–24	Washington Capitals	NHL	39	1	2	3	6	4	0	1	1	4
2024–25	Hershey Bears	AHL	3	0	2	2	0	—	—	—	—	—
2024–25	Washington Capitals	NHL	8	0	0	0	0	10	0	0	0	4
2025–26	Wilkes-Barre/Scranton Penguins	AHL	38	3	9	12	21	11	1	4	5	2
KHL totals			55	8	8	16	10	9	0	1	1	4
NHL totals			80	1	7	8	12	14	0	1	1	8

Medal record

Representing Russia

Ice hockey

World Junior Championships
Bronze medal – third place	2019 Canada	

=== International ===
Year	Team	Event	Result	GP	G	A	Pts	PIM
2015	Russia	U17	2nd place, silver medalist(s)	6	0	4	4	2
2016	Russia	U18	6th	5	0	2	2	4
2016	Russia	IH18	3rd place, bronze medalist(s)	5	0	0	0	2
2019	Russia	WJC	3rd place, bronze medalist(s)	7	2	4	6	10
Junior totals				23	2	10	12	18

Awards and achievements
Preceded by Lucas Johansen	Washington Capitals first-round draft pick 2018	Succeeded by Connor McMichael
