= Artyom Galimov =

Russian ice hockey player (born 1999)

- Born: 8 September 1999 (age 27) Samara, Russia
- Height: 5 ft 11 in (180 cm)
- Weight: 176 lb (80 kg; 12 st 8 lb)
- Position: Centre
- Shoots: Left
- KHL team: Ak Bars Kazan
- NHL draft: 129th overall, 2020; Anaheim Ducks
- Playing career: 2016–present

Artyom Albertovich Galimov (Russian: Артём Альбертович Галимов; born 8 September 1999) is a Russian ice hockey centre who plays for Ak Bars Kazan in the KHL. He was drafted by the Anaheim Ducks in the 5th round of the 2020 NHL entry draft with the 129th overall pick.

== International play ==
Medal record

Representing Russia

Ice hockey

World Junior Championships
Bronze medal – third place	2019 Canada	

Galimov first represented Russia after he was selected to the Russian team for the 2019 World Junior Championships in Vancouver, Canada. He ended the tournament with 3 points in 7 games, helping Russia claim the Bronze medal against Switzerland on 6 January 2019.

== Career statistics ==
=== Regular season and playoffs ===
			Regular season					Playoffs
Season	Team	League	GP	G	A	Pts	PIM	GP	G	A	Pts	PIM
2016–17	Irbis Kazan	MHL	48	5	5	10	42	10	2	1	3	0
2017–18	Irbis Kazan	MHL	32	9	18	27	47	4	0	0	0	25
2017–18	Bars Kazan	VHL	28	4	4	8	33	—	—	—	—	—
2018–19	Bars Kazan	VHL	40	9	15	24	22	—	—	—	—	—
2018–19	Irbis Kazan	MHL	5	2	1	3	29	—	—	—	—	—
2018–19	Ak Bars Kazan	KHL	1	0	0	0	0	—	—	—	—	—
2019–20	Ak Bars Kazan	KHL	55	13	10	23	10	4	0	3	3	4
2020–21	Ak Bars Kazan	KHL	41	6	10	16	18	15	2	5	7	4
2021–22	Ak Bars Kazan	KHL	47	7	15	22	18	6	1	0	1	4
2021–22	Bars Kazan	VHL	1	1	0	1	4	—	—	—	—	—
2022–23	Ak Bars Kazan	KHL	63	7	6	13	24	24	1	3	4	2
2023–24	Ak Bars Kazan	KHL	51	5	6	11	10	2	0	0	0	2
2024–25	Ak Bars Kazan	KHL	68	35	24	59	24	13	2	5	7	2
2025–26	Ak Bars Kazan	KHL	61	11	22	33	2	20	8	7	15	10
KHL totals			387	84	93	177	106	84	14	23	37	28

=== International ===
Year	Team	Event	GP	G	A	Pts	PIM
2019	Russia	WJC	7	1	2	3	0
Junior totals			7	1	2	3	0
