= Kirill Slepets =

Russian ice hockey player (born 1999)

- Born: 6 April 1999 (age 27) Khabarovsk, Russia
- Height: 5 ft 10 in (178 cm)
- Weight: 165 lb (75 kg; 11 st 11 lb)
- Position: Right wing
- Shoots: Left
- KHL team Former teams: HC Sochi; Lokomotiv Yaroslavl; Dinamo Riga; Oulun Kärpät; Amur Khabarovsk
- NHL draft: 152nd overall, 2019; Carolina Hurricanes
- Playing career: 2018–present

Kirill Olegovich Slepets (Russian: Кирилл Олегович Слепец; born 6 April 1999) is a Russian professional ice hockey winger currently playing for HC Sochi in the Kontinental Hockey League (KHL). He was selected 152nd overall by the Carolina Hurricanes in the 2019 NHL entry draft.

== Playing career ==
As a youth, Slepets played within the junior ranks of Lokomotiv Yaroslavl. He made his full professional debut in the 2018–19 season, appearing in 10 games with Lokomotiv Yaroslavl, scoring 1 goal. While showing a high offensive potential at the junior levels, Slepets was selected in the fifth round, 152nd overall in the 2019 NHL entry draft by the Carolina Hurricanes.

Slepets continued his development in Russia, playing in the second tier Supreme Hockey League with Buran Voronezh before he was traded by Lokomotiv to the Latvian KHL club, Dinamo Riga, on 13 November 2019. In the 2019–20 season, Slepets made 33 appearances with Riga, posting 3 goals and 7 points.

On 5 May 2020, Slepets was returned by Riga to Lokomotiv Yaroslavl in a trade for the rights to Brock Trotter. Slepets began the 2020–21 season with Buran Voronezh, regisitering 6 points through 17 games, before leaving the club. On 23 December 2020, Slepets continued in the VHL, signing with Neftyanik Almetievsk.

Following an offensively productive tenure with Neftyanik, Slepets returned to the KHL in the off-season, securing a one-year contract with HC Spartak Moscow on 9 August 2021. After attending the pre-season with Spartak, Slepets tenure with the club was short lived as he was traded before the 2021–22 season to hometown club, Amur Khabarovsk, in exchange for the rights to Andrei Loktionov on 25 August 2021.

In the 2023–24 season, Slepets returned for his third season with Amur Khabarovsk, recorded career bests with 8 goals and 11 assists for 19 points through 53 regular season games. On the eve of the post-season, Slepets' NHL rights were included in a trade by the Hurricanes to the Toronto Maple Leafs alongside the acquisition of Ilya Lyubushkin on 29 February 2024.

On 2 June 2026, Slepets was traded by Amur Khabarovsk to HC Sochi in exchange for Vasily Machulin prior to the 2026–27 season.

== Career statistics ==
=== Regular season and playoffs ===
			Regular season					Playoffs
Season	Team	League	GP	G	A	Pts	PIM	GP	G	A	Pts	PIM
2015–16	Team Russia	MHL	26	12	4	16	10	3	0	0	0	0
2016–17	Loko Yaroslavl	MHL	41	8	10	18	16	4	0	3	3	2
2017–18	Loko Yaroslavl	MHL	49	19	14	33	22	16	2	6	8	2
2017–18	Loko-Junior Yaroslavl	NMHL	1	0	0	0	2	—	—	—	—	—
2017–18	HC Ryazan	VHL	4	0	0	0	2	—	—	—	—	—
2018–19	Loko Yaroslavl	MHL	17	12	6	18	6	17	4	6	10	10
2018–19	Lokomotiv Yaroslavl	KHL	10	1	0	1	2	—	—	—	—	—
2018–19	HC Lada Togliatti	VHL	6	0	3	3	0	—	—	—	—	—
2019–20	Buran Voronezh	VHL	21	8	7	15	6	—	—	—	—	—
2019–20	Dinamo Riga	KHL	33	4	3	7	6	—	—	—	—	—
2020–21	Buran Voronezh	VHL	17	3	3	6	2	—	—	—	—	—
2020–21	Neftyanik Almetievsk	VHL	17	2	4	6	8	13	4	6	10	2
2021–22	Amur Khabarovsk	KHL	14	0	0	0	2	—	—	—	—	—
2021–22	Sokol Krasnoyarsk	VHL	5	2	1	3	2	—	—	—	—	—
2021–22	Oulun Kärpät	Liiga	15	1	3	4	2	1	0	0	0	0
2022–23	Amur Khabarovsk	KHL	17	0	3	3	6	—	—	—	—	—
2022–23	Sokol Krasnoyarsk	VHL	19	6	9	15	4	20	6	1	7	8
2023–24	Amur Khabarovsk	KHL	53	8	11	19	8	6	0	1	1	2
2024–25	Amur Khabarovsk	KHL	54	7	8	15	12	—	—	—	—	—
2025–26	Amur Khabarovsk	KHL	60	11	12	23	6	—	—	—	—	—
KHL totals			241	31	37	68	42	6	0	1	1	2

Medal record

Representing Russia

Ice hockey

World Junior Championships
Bronze medal – third place	2019 Canada	

=== International ===
Year	Team	Event	Result	GP	G	A	Pts	PIM
2015	Russia	U17	2nd place, silver medalist(s)	6	2	0	2	2
2017	Russia	U18	3rd place, bronze medalist(s)	7	4	2	6	0
2019	Russia	WJC	3rd place, bronze medalist(s)	7	5	2	7	4
Junior totals				20	11	4	15	6

== Awards and honours ==
Award	Year
MHL
Kharlamov Cup (Loko Yaroslavl)	2018, 2019
