= Mikey Anderson =

American ice hockey player (born 1999)

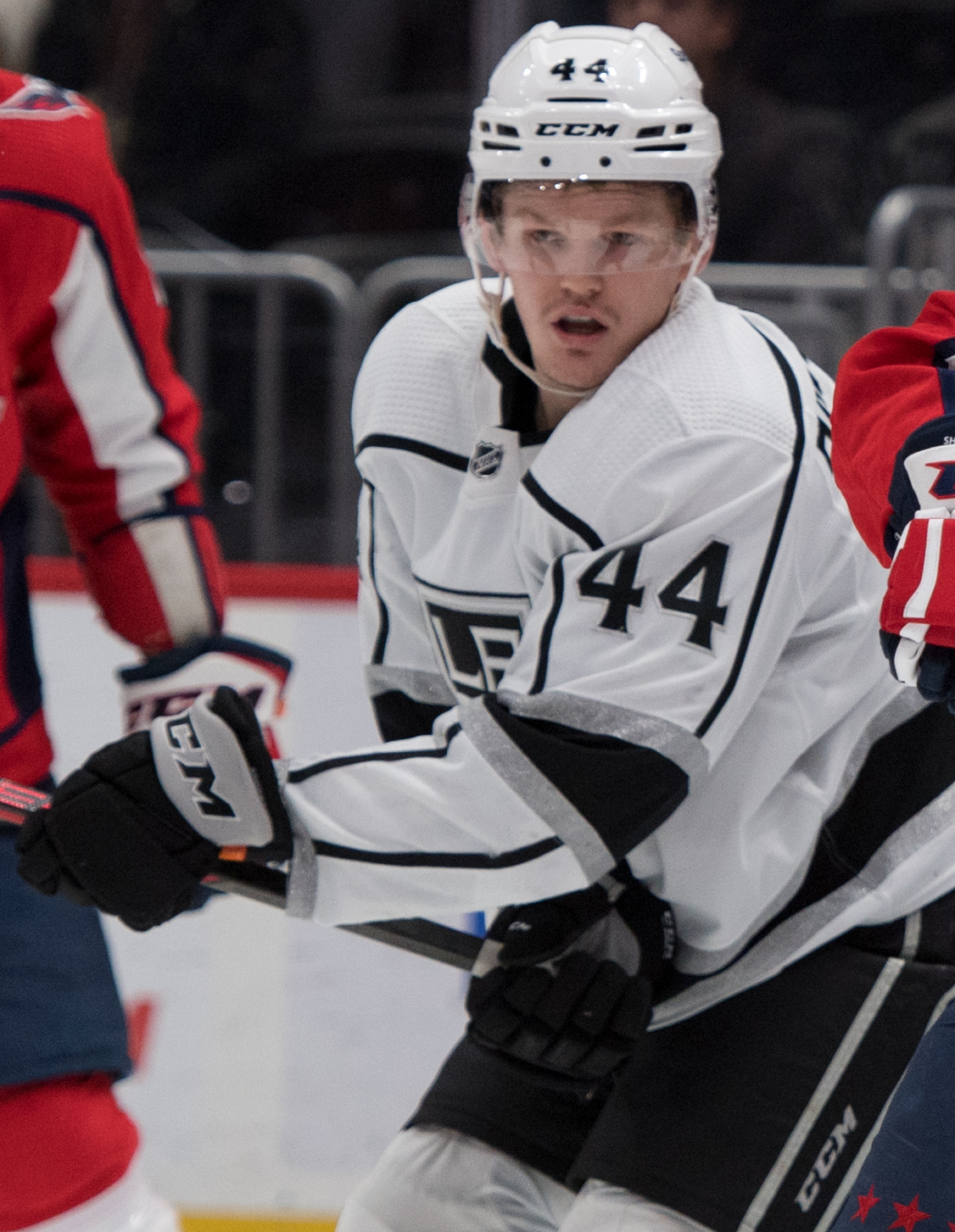
- Anderson with the Los Angeles Kings in 2021
- Born: May 25, 1999 (age 27) Fridley, Minnesota, U.S.
- Height: 6 ft 0 in (183 cm)
- Weight: 195 lb (88 kg; 13 st 13 lb)
- Position: Defense
- Shoots: Left
- NHL team: Los Angeles Kings
- NHL draft: 103rd overall, 2017; Los Angeles Kings
- Playing career: 2019–present

Michael Lyle Anderson (born May 25, 1999) is an American professional ice hockey player who is a defenseman and alternate captain for the Los Angeles Kings of the National Hockey League (NHL).

== Playing career ==
Anderson was drafted 103rd overall in the 2017 NHL entry draft by the Los Angeles Kings. On April 23, 2019, he signed a three-year, entry-level contract with the Kings. Anderson was called up to the Kings on February 28, 2020 and made his NHL debut the following day against the New Jersey Devils. Anderson scored his first NHL goal on March 9, 2020, against the Colorado Avalanche in a 3–1 win.

On September 10, 2022, Anderson signed a one-year $1 million contract with the Kings. During the following 2022–23 season, Anderson was signed to an eight-year, $33 million extension with the Kings on February 15, 2023.

== Personal life ==
Anderson's older brother Joey also plays in the NHL and the brothers skated against each other in Mikey's NHL debut. His sister Sami and father Gerry both played hockey for the College of St. Scholastica, while his grandfather played for the Minnesota–Duluth Bulldogs. His mother, Dana, was a professional racquetball player.

== Career statistics ==
=== Regular season and playoffs ===
			Regular season					Playoffs
Season	Team	League	GP	G	A	Pts	PIM	GP	G	A	Pts	PIM
2015–16	Waterloo Black Hawks	USHL	57	1	15	16	30	9	3	2	5	4
2016–17	Waterloo Black Hawks	USHL	54	5	29	34	52	8	2	1	3	10
2017–18	Minnesota–Duluth Bulldogs	NCHC	39	5	18	23	18	—	—	—	—	—
2018–19	Minnesota–Duluth Bulldogs	NCHC	40	6	21	27	18	—	—	—	—	—
2019–20	Ontario Reign	AHL	53	3	12	15	18	—	—	—	—	—
2019–20	Los Angeles Kings	NHL	6	1	0	1	0	—	—	—	—	—
2020–21	Los Angeles Kings	NHL	54	1	10	11	30	—	—	—	—	—
2021–22	Los Angeles Kings	NHL	57	2	6	8	8	7	0	1	1	4
2022–23	Los Angeles Kings	NHL	77	5	15	20	40	6	0	1	1	2
2023–24	Los Angeles Kings	NHL	74	2	16	18	18	5	1	2	3	2
2024–25	Los Angeles Kings	NHL	77	6	18	24	28	6	0	1	1	2
2025–26	Los Angeles Kings	NHL	80	4	16	20	22	4	0	0	0	2
NHL totals			425	21	81	102	146	28	1	5	6	12

=== International ===
Year	Team	Event	Result	GP	G	A	Pts	PIM
2018	United States	WJC	3rd place, bronze medalist(s)	7	0	1	1	2
2019	United States	WJC	2nd place, silver medalist(s)	7	2	3	5	6
Junior totals				14	2	4	6	8
