= Isac Lundeström =

Swedish ice hockey player (born 1999)

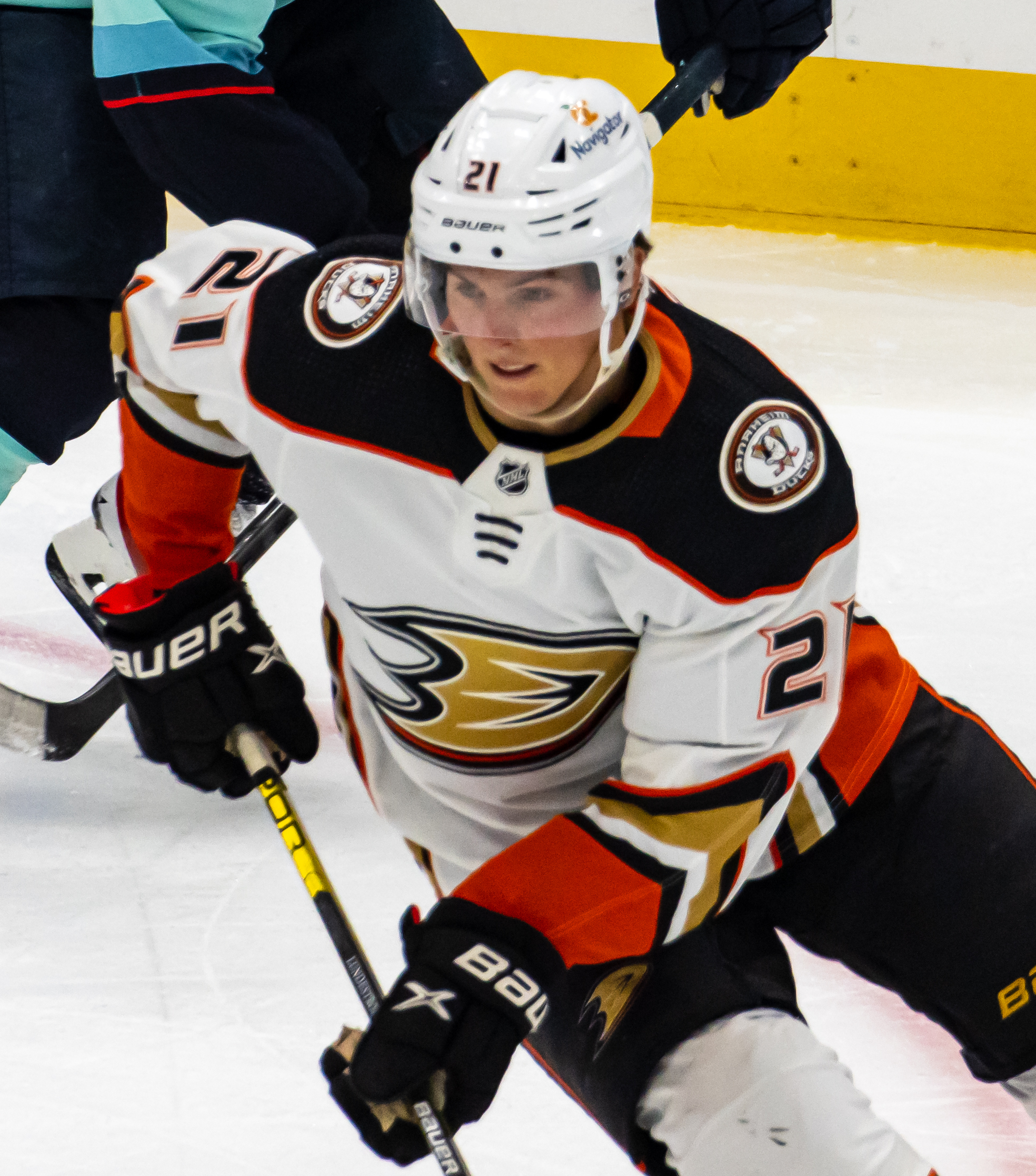
- Lundeström with the Anaheim Ducks in 2023
- Born: 6 November 1999 (age 26) Gällivare, Sweden
- Height: 6 ft 0 in (183 cm)
- Weight: 192 lb (87 kg; 13 st 10 lb)
- Position: Forward
- Shoots: Left
- NHL team Former teams: Columbus Blue Jackets; Luleå HF; Anaheim Ducks
- National team: Sweden
- NHL draft: 23rd overall, 2018; Anaheim Ducks
- Playing career: 2016–present

Isac Lundeström (born 6 November 1999) is a Swedish professional ice hockey player who is a forward for the Columbus Blue Jackets of the National Hockey League (NHL).

== Playing career ==
Lundeström played with Luleå HF of the Swedish Hockey League (SHL). He became the team's youngest ever scorer when he scored his first goal for the team at the age of 16. In his final year with Luleå HF before being drafted, he scored six goals and 15 points in 42 games.

=== Anaheim Ducks ===
Lundeström was selected by the Anaheim Ducks of the National Hockey League (NHL) in the first round, 23rd overall, of the 2018 NHL entry draft. On 7 August 2018, Lundeström signed a three-year, entry-level contract with the Ducks. Lundeström made the Ducks out of training camp for the 2018–19 season and made his NHL debut on 8 October 2018 in a 3–2 win over the Detroit Red Wings. He played in 15 games with the Ducks before being assigned to Anaheim's American Hockey League (AHL) affiliate, the San Diego Gulls. He played 12 games with the Gulls, collecting six points before departing to play for the Swedish national team. After returning from the national team, Lundeström was reassigned back to Luleå HF. He played ten games in Sweden, collecting two goals and ten points before the team's season ended. He returned to North America to participate in the Gulls' playoff run which led to San Diego's first appearance in the AHL's conference finals.

He returned to the Gulls for the 2019–20 season, playing the majority of the season in the AHL, except for 15 games with the Ducks. With the 2020–21 North American season delayed due to the COVID-19 pandemic, Lundeström in order to recommence playing signed on loan with Allsvenskan club, Timrå IK, on 5 October 2020. He made 12 appearances with Timrå IK, recording 5 goals and 11 points before he was recalled from his loan spell by the Ducks on 16 November 2020. He scored his first NHL goal on 6 February 2021 in a 2–1 shootout victory over the San Jose Sharks. On 1 March 2021, Lundeström recorded his first NHL hat-trick with three goals in the Ducks' 5–4 loss against the St. Louis Blues. He signed a one-year contract extension on 6 August 2021.

Lundeström established himself with the Ducks in the 2021–22 season, appearing in 80 games, scoring 16 goals and 29 points. A restricted free agent, he signed a two-year contract extension on 25 July 2022 with the Ducks just before going to salary arbitration. In the 2022–23 season, Lundeström appeared in 61 games, scoring four goals and fourteen points. He blocked a shot that broke his finger in a 5–0 loss to the Dallas Stars on 1 December 2022 which caused him to miss 21 games. In the offseason, Lundeström suffered an injury to his Achilles tendon while training that caused him to miss the first half of the season. He returned to the lineup on 3 January 2024 in a 2–1 loss to the Toronto Maple Leafs.

Following his seventh season with the Ducks in 2024–25, Lundeström as a pending restricted free agent was not tendered a qualifying offer, ending his tenure in Anaheim.

=== Columbus Blue Jackets ===
On 1 July 2025, the opening day of free agency, Lundeström was signed to a two-year, $2.6 million contract with the Columbus Blue Jackets.

== International play ==
Medal record

Representing Sweden

Ice hockey

World Championships
Bronze medal – third place	2024 Czechia	
Bronze medal – third place	2025 Sweden/Denmark	

Lundeström represented Sweden, centering the team's third line at the 2024 IIHF World Championship. Sweden won the bronze medal, defeating Canada 4–2.

== Career statistics ==
=== Regular season and playoffs ===
			Regular season					Playoffs
Season	Team	League	GP	G	A	Pts	PIM	GP	G	A	Pts	PIM
2014–15	Luleå HF	J20	3	1	0	1	0	3	0	0	0	0
2015–16	Luleå HF	J20	34	4	13	17	12	—	—	—	—	—
2015–16	Luleå HF	SHL	4	0	0	0	0	—	—	—	—	—
2016–17	Luleå HF	J20	10	3	4	7	4	3	1	2	3	0
2016–17	Luleå HF	SHL	45	3	3	6	0	1	0	0	0	0
2017–18	Luleå HF	SHL	42	6	9	15	14	3	0	0	0	0
2017–18	Luleå HF	J20	—	—	—	—	—	6	0	5	5	0
2018–19	Anaheim Ducks	NHL	15	0	2	2	2	—	—	—	—	—
2018–19	San Diego Gulls	AHL	12	0	6	6	2	7	1	2	3	0
2018–19	Luleå HF	SHL	17	2	7	9	2	10	2	6	8	0
2019–20	San Diego Gulls	AHL	43	6	15	21	4	—	—	—	—	—
2019–20	Anaheim Ducks	NHL	15	0	4	4	0	—	—	—	—	—
2020–21	Timrå IK	Allsv	12	5	6	11	6	—	—	—	—	—
2020–21	Anaheim Ducks	NHL	41	6	3	9	14	—	—	—	—	—
2021–22	Anaheim Ducks	NHL	80	16	13	29	8	—	—	—	—	—
2022–23	Anaheim Ducks	NHL	61	4	10	14	2	—	—	—	—	—
2023–24	Anaheim Ducks	NHL	46	5	6	11	2	—	—	—	—	—
2024–25	Anaheim Ducks	NHL	79	4	11	15	10	—	—	—	—	—
2025–26	Columbus Blue Jackets	NHL	68	4	8	12	4	—	—	—	—	—
SHL totals			108	11	19	30	16	14	2	6	8	0
NHL totals			405	39	57	96	42	—	—	—	—	—

=== International ===
Year	Team	Event	Result	GP	G	A	Pts	PIM
2015	Sweden	U17	3rd place, bronze medalist(s)	6	0	2	2	0
2016	Sweden	U18	2nd place, silver medalist(s)	7	0	0	0	0
2016	Sweden	IH18	4th	5	0	2	2	2
2017	Sweden	U18	4th	7	1	4	5	2
2018	Sweden	WJC	2nd place, silver medalist(s)	7	2	0	2	2
2019	Sweden	WJC	5th	5	1	3	4	4
2021	Sweden	WC	9th	7	1	1	2	0
2024	Sweden	WC	3rd place, bronze medalist(s)	10	2	3	5	0
2025	Sweden	WC	3rd place, bronze medalist(s)	10	1	3	4	4
Junior totals				30	4	11	15	10
Senior totals				27	4	7	11	4

Awards and achievements
Preceded by Sam Steel	Anaheim Ducks first-round draft pick 2018	Succeeded by Trevor Zegras
