= Samuel Hlavaj =

Slovak ice hockey player (born 2001)

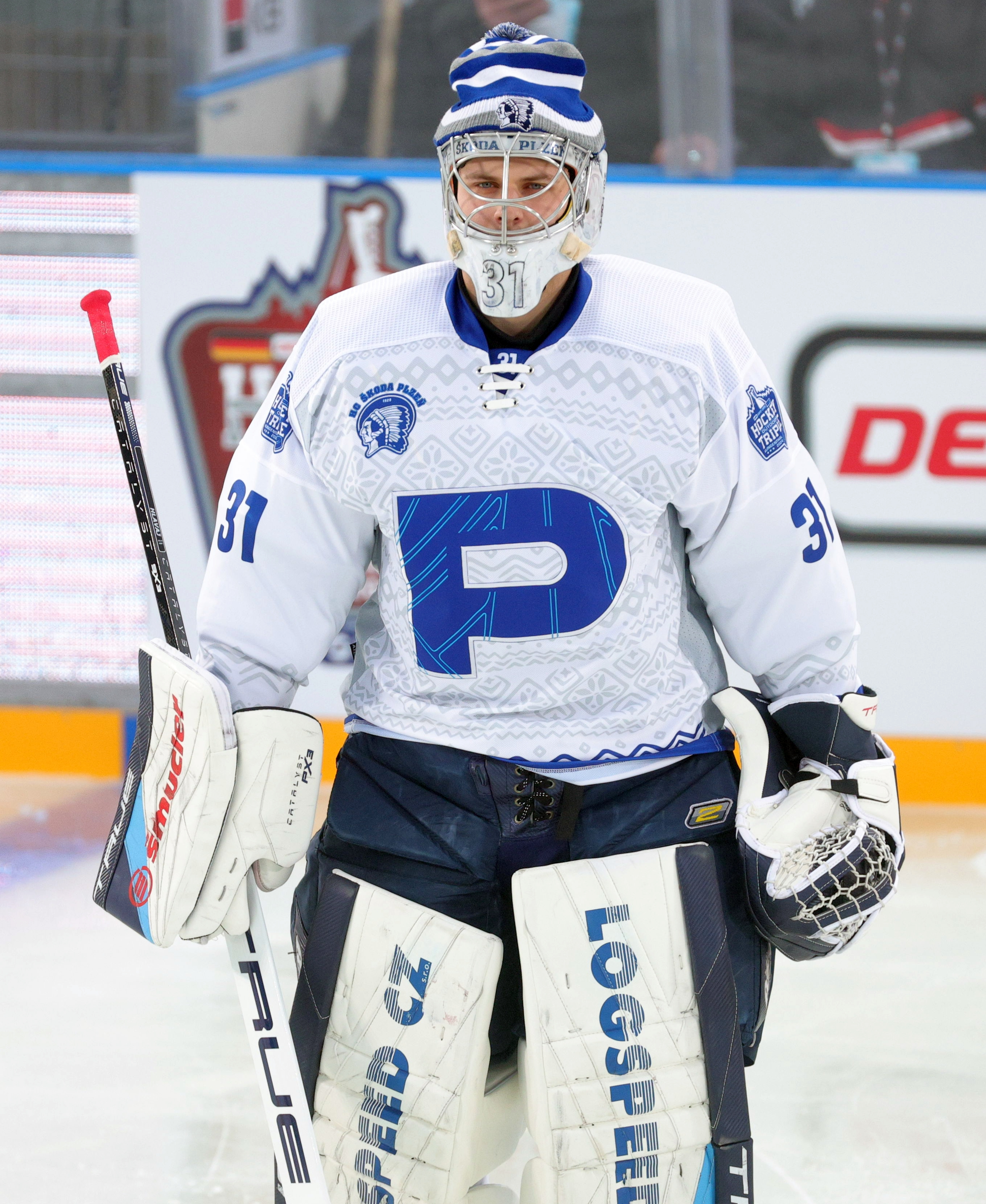
- Hlavaj with HC Škoda Plzeň in 2024
- Born: 29 May 2001 (age 25) Martin, Slovakia
- Height: 6 ft 4 in (193 cm)
- Weight: 218 lb (99 kg; 15 st 8 lb)
- Position: Goaltender
- Catches: Left
- NHL team (P) Cur. team Former teams: Toronto Maple Leafs; Toronto Marlies (AHL); HC Slovan Bratislava; HC Škoda Plzeň; Iowa Wild
- National team: Slovakia
- NHL draft: Undrafted
- Playing career: 2017–present

Samuel Hlavaj (born 29 May 2001) is a Slovak professional ice hockey player who is a goaltender for the Toronto Marlies of the American Hockey League (AHL). Hlavaj has played for Slovakia senior team in the World Championships of 2023, 2024, 2025 and 2026. He also played in the 2026 Winter Olympics.

== Playing career ==
=== Junior ===
Hlavaj signed for Lincoln Stars of the United States Hockey League (USHL) during the 2018–19 season. The following season, 2019–20, Hlavaj played for Canadian side Sherbrooke Phoenix, during which time he won the Jacques Plante Memorial Trophy.

=== Professional ===
Back in Europe, he played for Slovak team HC Slovan Bratislava for two seasons, before joining Czech side HC Škoda Plzeň in May 2023, signing a two-year contract.

On 5 April 2024, after completing his first season with Plzeň, Hlavaj enacted his NHL out clause after agreeing to terms with the Minnesota Wild on a two-year, entry-level contract starting with the 2024–25 NHL season.

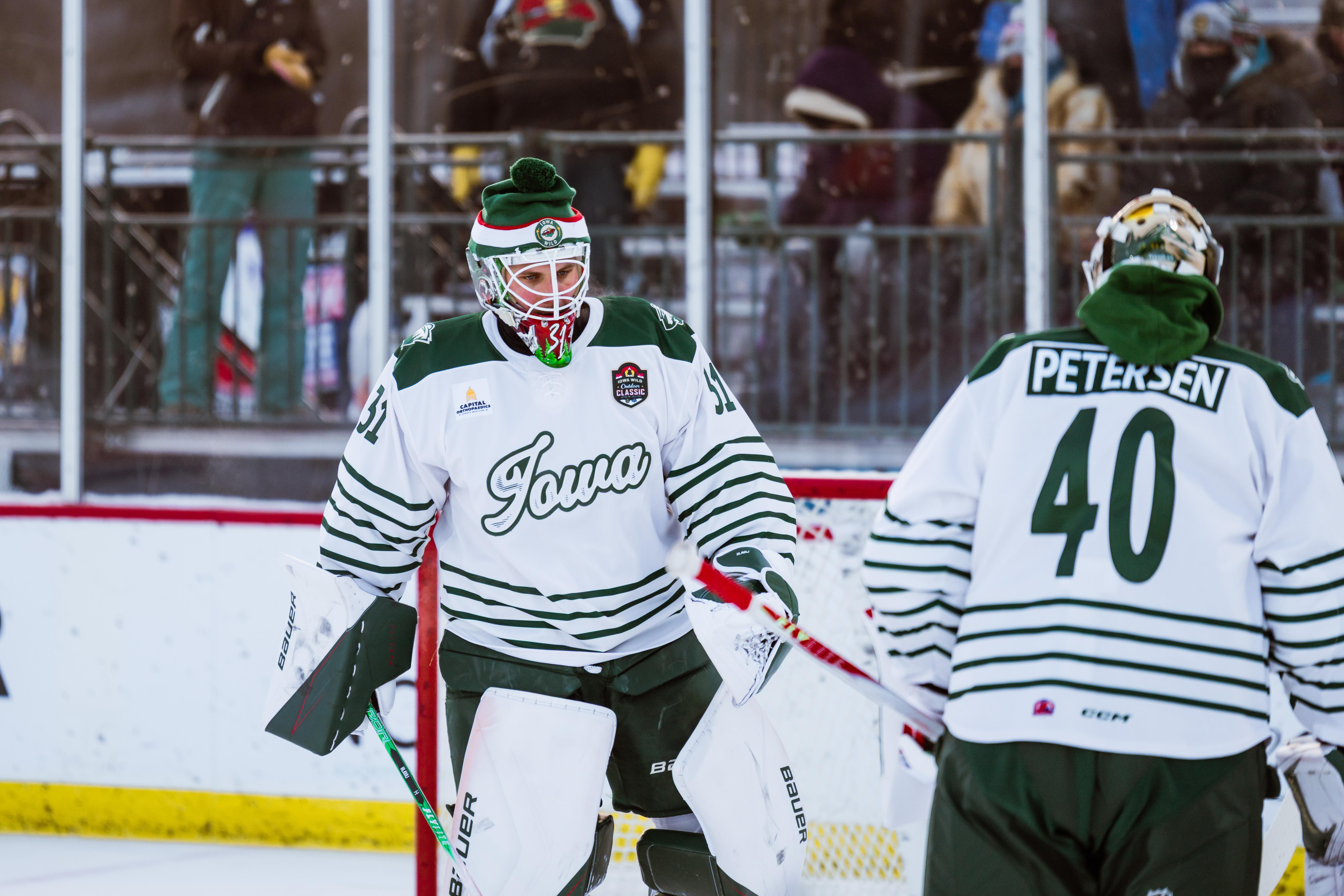
Hlavaj with Iowa Wild

Having completed his two year tenure with the Wild, Hlavaj was released by the Wild as a free agent. On 3 July 2026, Hlavaj continued his career in North America, signing a one-year, two-way contract with the Toronto Maple Leafs for the 2026–27 season.

== International play ==
Hlavaj played for the Slovakia men's national junior ice hockey team at the 2019 World Junior Ice Hockey Championships. Hlavaj started three games for Slovakia at the 2023 IIHF World Championship. At the 2024 IIHF World Championship he didn't play in Slovakia's opening game, but made five appearances, including a 4–0 win against Poland in which he completed a shutout. At the tournament Hlavaj wore a mask with an image of Juraj Jánošík on it.

In August 2024 he was included in the Slovakia squad for the qualification tournament for the 2026 Winter Olympics, in which he played, and resulted in Slovakia, as well as Denmark and Latvia, qualifying.

== Career statistics ==
=== Regular season and playoffs ===
			Regular season									Playoffs
Season	Team	League	GP	W	L	OT	MIN	GA	SO	GAA	SV%	GP	W	L	MIN	GA	SO	GAA	SV%
2017–18	MHA Martin	Slovak.20	8	3	5	0	419	22	0	3.15	.917	—	—	—	—	—	—	—	—
2017–18	HK Orange 20	Slovak	1	0	0	1	14	2	0	8.67	.714	—	—	—	—	—	—	—	—
2017–18	HK Orange 20	Slovak.1	5	1	3	1	283	17	0	3.61	.877	—	—	—	—	—	—	—	—
2018–19	HK Orange 20	Slovak	4	0	3	1	212	21	0	5.95	.861	—	—	—	—	—	—	—	—
2018–19	HK Orange 20	Slovak.1	3	2	0	1	119	2	1	1.01	.957	—	—	—	—	—	—	—	—
2018–19	Lincoln Stars	USHL	22	3	18	1	1178	90	0	4.58	.862	—	—	—	—	—	—	—	—
2019–20	Sherbrooke Phoenix	QMJHL	39	33	3	2	2295	86	3	2.25	.915	—	—	—	—	—	—	—	—
2020–21	Sherbrooke Phoenix	QMJHL	20	7	11	2	1175	62	1	3.17	.895	3	0	3	176	15	0	5.10	.857
2021–22	HC Slovan Bratislava	Slovak	9	5	3	1	476	19	2	2.39	.908	—	—	—	—	—	—	—	—
2021–22	HC Modré Krídla Slovan	Slovak.1	15	6	7	2	913	49	2	3.22	.909	8	3	5	476	21	0	2.65	.920
2022–23	HC Slovan Bratislava	Slovak	18	9	6	3	1060	45	1	2.55	.916	1	0	1	58	3	0	3.10	.900
2022–23	HC Modré Krídla Slovan	Slovak.1	6	4	1	1	370	20	1	3.25	.913	1	1	0	61	3	0	2.96	.923
2023–24	HC Plzeň	ELH	28	8	20	0	1511	78	0	3.10	.903	2	0	2	118	8	0	4.07	.877
2024–25	Iowa Wild	AHL	36	14	14	3	1958	93	1	2.85	.904	—	—	—	—	—	—	—	—
2024–25	Iowa Heartlanders	ECHL	5	2	2	1	297	15	0	3.02	.885	—	—	—	—	—	—	—	—
2025–26	Iowa Wild	AHL	22	7	11	4	1316	72	2	3.28	.887	—	—	—	—	—	—	—	—
2025–26	Iowa Heartlanders	ECHL	1	0	1	0	58	4	0	4.14	.886	—	—	—	—	—	—	—	—
ELH totals			28	8	20	0	1,511	78	0	3.10	.903	2	0	2	118	8	0	4.07	.877

=== International ===
Year	Team	Event	Result	GP	W	L	OT	MIN	GA	SO	GAA	SV%
2018	Slovakia	U18	7th	1	0	1	0	58	4	0	4.11	.889
2019	Slovakia	WJC	8th	4	1	2	0	188	12	0	3.83	.872
2019	Slovakia	U18	10th	4	0	4	0	201	15	0	4.49	.894
2020	Slovakia	WJC	8th	5	1	3	0	201	18	0	5.37	.851
2021	Slovakia	WJC	8th	2	0	2	0	119	8	0	4.03	.889
2023	Slovakia	WC	9th	3	0	3	0	189	7	0	2.22	.932
2024	Slovakia	WC	7th	5	3	2	0	307	13	1	2.54	.925
2024	Slovakia	OGQ	Q	3	3	0	0	180	5	0	1.67	.929
2025	Slovakia	WC	11th	5	2	2	1	302	10	0	1.99	.912
2026	Slovakia	OG	4th	5	2	3	0	270	16	0	3.56	.908
2026	Slovakia	WC	9th	5	2	3	0	296	13	0	2.63	.873
Junior totals				16	2	12	0	767	57	0	4.46	.886
Senior totals				26	12	13	1	1544	64	1	2.49	.913
