= Philipp Kurashev =

Swiss ice hockey player (born 1999)

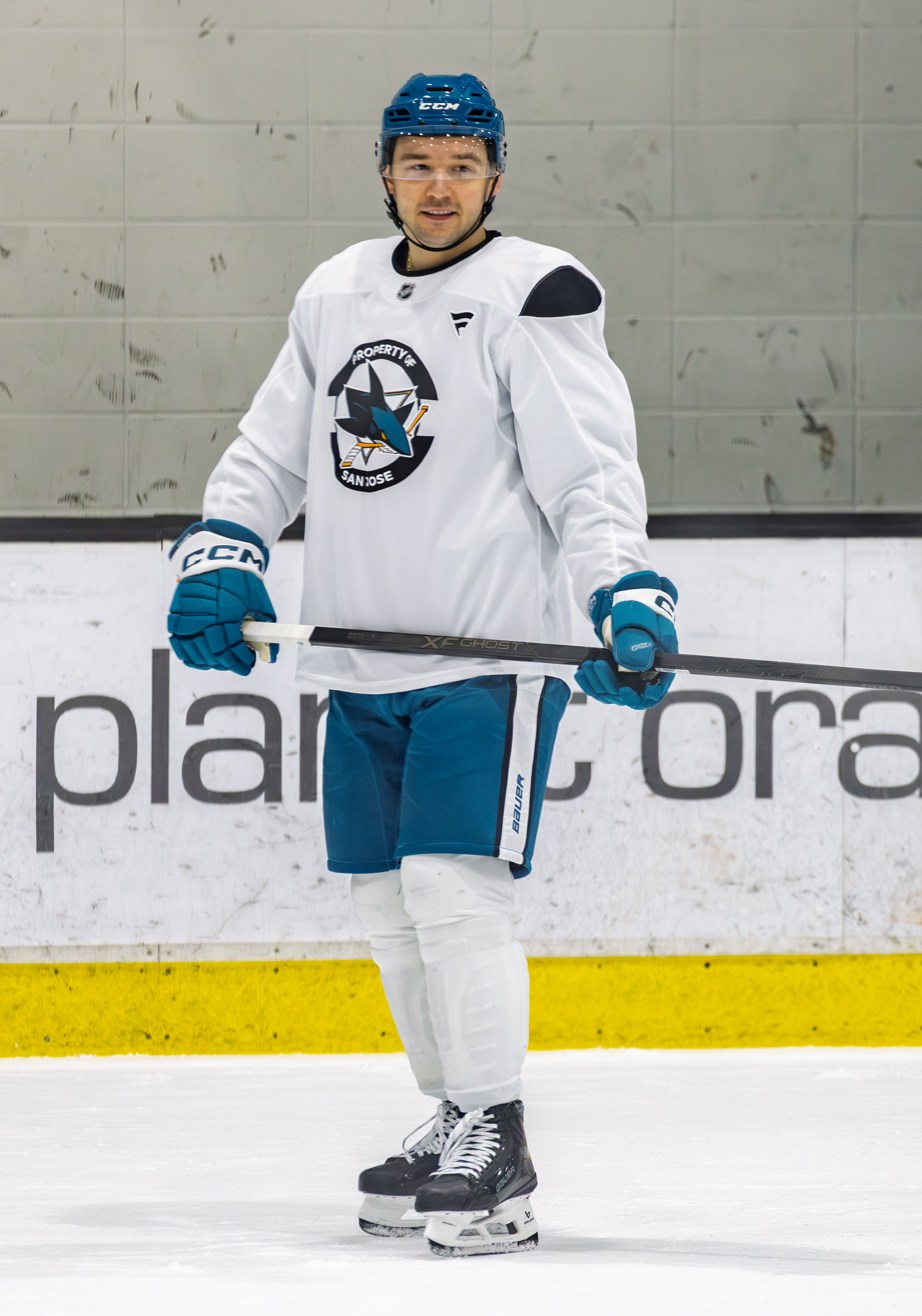
- Kurashev with the San Jose Sharks in April 2026
- Born: 12 October 1999 (age 27) Davos, Switzerland
- Height: 6 ft 0 in (183 cm)
- Weight: 190 lb (86 kg; 13 st 8 lb)
- Position: Forward
- Shoots: Left
- NL team Former teams: Lausanne HC; HC Lugano; Chicago Blackhawks; San Jose Sharks
- National team: Switzerland
- NHL draft: 120th overall, 2018; Chicago Blackhawks
- Playing career: 2019–present

Philipp Kurashev (Russian: Филипп Курашев; born 12 October 1999) is a Swiss–Russian professional ice hockey forward for the Lausanne HC of the National League (NL) . He most recently played in the National Hockey League (NHL) for the San Jose Sharks. Kurashev was drafted 120th overall by the Chicago Blackhawks in the 2018 NHL entry draft.

== Playing career ==
Kurashev played his junior hockey in the Quebec Major Junior Hockey League (QMJHL) for the Quebec Remparts. He played 183 regular season games and put up 179 points (69 goals) over three seasons. He also played 17 playoff games, putting up 13 points (3 goals).

On 12 March 2019, Kurashev signed a three-year, entry-level contract with the Chicago Blackhawks. He reported to the Rockford IceHogs at the end of his junior season and made his professional debut on 5 April 2019.

Prior to the 2020–21 season, with the North America season delayed due to the COVID-19 pandemic, Kurashev remained in Switzerland as he was loaned to the National League (NL) club, HC Lugano, on 6 September 2020. Kurashev made his NHL debut with the Blackhawks on 15 January 2021 against the Tampa Bay Lightning. Four days later, on 19 January, Kurashev scored his first NHL goal against Sergei Bobrovsky of the Florida Panthers.

Kurashev became a restricted free agent before the 2023–24 NHL season and requested an arbitration hearing for a new contract. An arbitrator awarded Kurashev a two-year contract with an average annual value of $2.25 million on 23 July 2023. He enjoyed his most productive NHL season, recording a career-high 18 goals and 36 assists. He finished second-best on the Blackhawks in goals, assists, and points behind his line mate, Connor Bedard.

In the following 2024–25 season, Kurashev struggled to replicate his previous seasons scoring output, recording a career low 14 points through 51 regular season games.

In the 2025 offseason, Kurashev was released by the Blackhawks as a free agent after he was not tendered a qualifying offer. On 1 July 2025, he was immediately signed to a one-year, $1.2 million contract by the San Jose Sharks for the 2025–26 season.

He signed a one year contract with Lausanne HC in October 2026. This deal contains an exit clause if he were to rejoin the NHL as well as an option for an additional year in Lausanne.

== International play ==
Medal record

Representing Switzerland

Ice hockey

World Championships
| Silver medal – second place | 2024 Czechia | |

Kurashev was named to Switzerland men's national team for the 2019 IIHF World Championship in Slovakia.

He represented Switzerland at the 2024 IIHF World Championship and won a silver medal.

He did not play in the 2025 IIHF World Championship as he was recovering from wrist surgery.

Kurashev represented Switzerland at the 2026 Olympic Games where he scored 1 goal and 2 assists before being eliminated in the quarterfinals against Finland.

He was not able to play in the 2026 IIHF World Championship due to illness.

== Personal life ==
Kurashev is the son of Russian former professional hockey player Konstantin Kurashev. He holds Swiss and Russian dual citizenship, and is fluent in English, German, and Russian.

== Career statistics ==
=== Regular season and playoffs ===
| | | | Regular season | | | | | Playoffs |
| Season | Team | League | GP | G | A | Pts | PIM | GP | G | A | Pts | PIM |
|---|---|---|---|---|---|---|---|---|---|---|---|---|
| 2014–15 | SC Bern | Elite Jr. A | 3 | 1 | 1 | 2 | 0 | — | — | — | — | — |
| 2015–16 | GCK Lions | Elite Jr. A | 34 | 9 | 9 | 18 | 8 | 12 | 4 | 4 | 8 | 8 |
| 2016–17 | Quebec Remparts | QMJHL | 65 | 21 | 33 | 54 | 10 | 4 | 1 | 2 | 3 | 2 |
| 2017–18 | Quebec Remparts | QMJHL | 59 | 19 | 41 | 60 | 24 | 6 | 1 | 4 | 5 | 6 |
| 2018–19 | Quebec Remparts | QMJHL | 59 | 29 | 36 | 65 | 33 | 7 | 1 | 4 | 5 | 8 |
| 2018–19 | Rockford IceHogs | AHL | 3 | 0 | 0 | 0 | 0 | — | — | — | — | — |
| 2019–20 | Rockford IceHogs | AHL | 36 | 7 | 12 | 19 | 8 | — | — | — | — | — |
| 2020–21 | HC Lugano | NL | 13 | 0 | 9 | 9 | 0 | — | — | — | — | — |
| 2020–21 | Chicago Blackhawks | NHL | 54 | 8 | 8 | 16 | 12 | — | — | — | — | — |
| 2021–22 | Chicago Blackhawks | NHL | 67 | 6 | 15 | 21 | 12 | — | — | — | — | — |
| 2021–22 | Rockford IceHogs | AHL | 3 | 2 | 1 | 3 | 0 | — | — | — | — | — |
| 2022–23 | Chicago Blackhawks | NHL | 70 | 9 | 16 | 25 | 14 | — | — | — | — | — |
| 2023–24 | Chicago Blackhawks | NHL | 75 | 18 | 36 | 54 | 23 | — | — | — | — | — |
| 2024–25 | Chicago Blackhawks | NHL | 51 | 7 | 7 | 14 | 14 | — | — | — | — | — |
| 2025–26 | San Jose Sharks | NHL | 43 | 7 | 13 | 20 | 16 | — | — | — | — | — |
| NL totals | | | 13 | 0 | 9 | 9 | 0 | — | — | — | — | — |
| NHL totals | | | 360 | 55 | 95 | 150 | 91 | — | — | — | — | — |

=== International ===
| Year | Team | Event | Result | GP | G | A | Pts | PIM |
|---|---|---|---|---|---|---|---|---|
| 2016 | Switzerland | U18 | 8th | 5 | 1 | 1 | 2 | 4 |
| 2016 | Switzerland | IH18 | 8th | 4 | 0 | 0 | 0 | 2 |
| 2017 | Switzerland | U18 | 8th | 5 | 3 | 1 | 4 | 2 |
| 2018 | Switzerland | WJC | 8th | 5 | 1 | 2 | 3 | 2 |
| 2019 | Switzerland | WJC | 4th | 7 | 6 | 1 | 7 | 4 |
| 2019 | Switzerland | WC | 8th | 8 | 1 | 3 | 4 | 4 |
| 2021 | Switzerland | WC | 6th | 8 | 1 | 4 | 5 | 14 |
| 2022 | Switzerland | WC | 5th | 8 | 1 | 3 | 4 | 0 |
| 2024 | Switzerland | WC | 2nd place, silver medalist(s) | 8 | 0 | 2 | 2 | 6 |
| 2026 | Switzerland | OG | 5th | 5 | 1 | 2 | 3 | 2 |
| Junior totals | | | | 26 | 11 | 5 | 16 | 14 |
| Senior totals | | | | 37 | 4 | 14 | 18 | 26 |
