= 2017 IIHF World U18 Championships =

2017 IIHF U18 World Championship

Tournament details
- Host country: Slovakia
- Venue(s): 2 (in 2 host cities)
- Dates: 13–23 April 2017
- Teams: 10

Final positions
- Champions: United States (10th title)
- Runners-up: Finland
- Third place: Russia
- Fourth place: Sweden

Tournament statistics
- Games played: 31
- Goals scored: 196 (6.32 per game)
- Attendance: 73,690 (2,377 per game)
- Scoring leader(s): (Finland) Kristian Vesalainen (13 points)

Awards
- MVP: (Finland) Kristian Vesalainen

The 2017 IIHF U18 World Championship was the 19th IIHF World U18 Championship and was hosted by Poprad and Spišská Nová Ves, Slovakia. The tournament was played from 13 to 23 April 2017. Finland entered the tournament as the defending champions and once again advanced to the final, but this time they lost to the United States.

== Top Division ==
All times are local. (Central European Summer Time – UTC+02:00)

=== Preliminary round ===
The four best ranked teams from each group of the preliminary round advance to the quarterfinals, while the last placed team from both groups plays a relegation round in a best of three format to determine the relegated team.

==== Group A ====
Pos	Team	Pld	W	OTW	OTL	L	GF	GA	GD	Pts	Qualification
1	Finland	4	4	0	0	0	23	10	+13	12	Advance to Quarterfinals
2	Canada	4	2	1	0	1	18	13	+5	8	Advance to Quarterfinals
3	Slovakia	4	2	0	1	1	13	10	+3	7	Advance to Quarterfinals
4	Switzerland	4	1	0	0	3	9	14	−5	3	Advance to Quarterfinals
5	Latvia	4	0	0	0	4	3	19	−16	0	Advance to Relegation round

Source: IIHF

13 April 2017; 15:30	Latvia	1–4 (1–1, 0–2, 0–1)	Canada	Poprad Ice Stadium, Poprad; Attendance: 1,435

Game reference

Niklavs Rauza
Goalies
Ian Scott
Referees:
(Switzerland) Alex Dipietro
(Sweden) Mikael Holm
Linesmen:
(France) Thomas Caillot
(South Korea) Park Jun-soo

	0–1	11:50 – Mattheos (PS)
Paskausks – 18:08	1–1
	1–2	23:36 – Comtois (Entwistle) (PP)
	1–3	28:26 – Ratcliffe (Schnarr)
	1–4	50:48 – Entwistle (Smith, Mitchell)

16 min
Penalties
32 min
19
Shots
54

13 April 2017; 19:30	Slovakia	4–5 (0–1, 4–3, 0–1)	Finland	Poprad Ice Stadium, Poprad; Attendance: 3,935

Game reference

Juraj Sklenár
Goalies
Ukko-Pekka Luukkonen
Referees:
(Canada) Alexandre Garon
(United Kingdom) Liam Sewell
Linesmen:
(United States) William Hancock II
(Czech Republic) Jiří Ondráček

	0–1	09:55 – Vesalainen (Ikonen)
	0–2	23:46 – Talvitie (Teräväinen)
	0–3	28:59 – Vesalainen (Heiskanen, Ylönen) (PP)
Hrehorčák – 29:18	1–3
Hrehorčák (Žiak) (PP) – 31:20	2–3
Kupec (Žiak) – 35:53	3–3
Stacho (Fehérváry) – 36:57	4–3
	4–4	38:40 – Ylönen (Virtanen, Talvitie)
	4–5	52:17 – Talvitie (Heiskanen, Utunen)

4 min
Penalties
6 min
31
Shots
29

14 April 2017; 19:30	Switzerland	4–0 (2–0, 1–0, 1–0)	Latvia	Poprad Ice Stadium, Poprad; Attendance: 1,210

Game reference

Gianluca Zaetta
Goalies
Jānis Voris
Niklavs Rauza
Referees:
(Russia) Artur Kulev
(Croatia) Trpimir Piragić
Linesmen:
(Czech Republic) Jiří Ondráček
(Sweden) Emil Yletyinen

Eggenberger (Müller, Hischier) – 02:57	1–0
Kurashev (Matewa, Sigrist) – 13:12	2–0
Sigrist (Le Coultre) (PP) – 27:40	3–0
Eggenberger – 43:50	4–0

8 min
Penalties
10 min
44
Shots
27

15 April 2017; 15:30	Finland	5–1 (2–0, 2–0, 1–1)	Switzerland	Poprad Ice Stadium, Poprad; Attendance: 1,962

Game reference

Ukko-Pekka Luukkonen
Goalies
Gianluca Zaetta
Beat Trudel
Referees:
(Sweden) Mikael Holm
(Austria) Manuel Nikolic
Linesmen:
(United States) William Hancock II
(Czech Republic) Jiří Ondráček

Nyman (Talvitie, Ikonen) (PP) – 07:28	1–0
Nyman (Vesalainen, Ikonen) – 16:14	2–0
Kotkaniemi (Kupari) – 32:14	3–0
Ikonen (Nyman, Vesalainen) – 33:19	4–0
	4–1	47:40 – Müller (Matewa, Hischier)
Latvala (Kotkaniemi, Koskenkorva) – 47:53	5–1

6 min
Penalties
4 min
33
Shots
26

15 April 2017; 19:30	Canada	4–3 OT (3–1, 0–1, 0–1); OT: (1–0)	Slovakia	Poprad Ice Stadium, Poprad; Attendance: 4,318

Game reference

Ian Scott
Goalies
Juraj Sklenár
Jakub Kostelný
Referees:
(Czech Republic) Oldřich Hejduk
(Croatia) Trpimir Piragić
Linesmen:
(South Korea) Park Jun-soo
(Sweden) Emil Yletyinen

	0–1	08:37 – Liška (Ružička) (PP)
Olson (Entwistle) – 18:18	1–1
Mattheos (Chainey) – 18:36	2–1
Ratcliffe – 19:49	3–1
	3–2	36:34 – Hrehorčák (Roman)
	3–3	42:38 – Liška (Fafrák) (SH)
Mattheos (McIsaac) – 62:38	4–3

28 min
Penalties
10 min
36
Shots
29

16 April 2017; 19:30	Latvia	2–7 (1–2, 1–3, 0–2)	Finland	Poprad Ice Stadium, Poprad; Attendance: 1,116

Game reference

Niklavs Rauza
Jānis Voris
Goalies
Lassi Lehtinen
Referees:
(Norway) Robert Hallin
(United States) Stephen Thomson
Linesmen:
(France) Thomas Caillot
(Slovakia) Lukáš Kacej

Petrovs (Udris) – 11:59	1–0
	1–1	12:44 – Vaakanainen (Heiskanen, Vesalainen)
	1–2	13:51 – Ikonen (Heiskanen) (PP)
Paškausks (Smirnovs) – 28:51	2–2
	2–3	31:09 – Ikonen (Vesalainen, Heiskanen) (PP2)
	2–4	31:52 – Ylönen (Kotkaniemi, Kupari) (PP)
	2–5	39:14 – Ikonen (Vesalainen, Nyman)
	2–6	42:58 – Vesalainen (Vaakanainen, Heiskanen)
	2–7	55:45 – Ylönen (Talvitie, Virtanen)

12 min
Penalties
6 min
16
Shots
44

17 April 2017; 15:30	Canada	7–3 (2–0, 1–2, 4–1)	Switzerland	Poprad Ice Stadium, Poprad; Attendance: 1,562

Game reference

Jake McGrath
Goalies
Gianluca Zaetta
Akira Schmid
Referees:
(Norway) Robert Hallin
(United Kingdom) Liam Sewell
Linesmen:
(South Korea) Park Jun-soo
(Sweden) Emil Yletyinen

Studnicka (Olson) – 09:44	1–0
Glass (Chainey) – 12:29	2–0
Studnicka (Strome) – 23:31	3–0
	3–1	32:33 – Weibel (SH)
	3–2	38:35 – Kurashev (Le Coultre, Hischier) (PP2)
Glass (Chainey, Woo) – 41:15	4–2
Olson (Glass, Chainey) – 49:47	5–2
	5–3	56:07 – Eggenberger (Kurashev, Hischier)
Mattheos (ENG) – 57:35	6–3
Entwistle (McIsaac, Mitchell) – 59:19	7–3

12 min
Penalties
6 min
34
Shots
30

17 April 2017; 19:30	Slovakia	4–0 (1–0, 2–0, 1–0)	Latvia	Poprad Ice Stadium, Poprad; Attendance: 4,496

Game reference

Jakub Kostelný
Goalies
Jānis Voris
Referees:
(Finland) Lassi Heikkinen
(Germany) Marc Iwert
Linesmen:
(France) Thomas Caillot
(United States) William Hancock II

Havrila (Regenda, Hrehorčák) – 17:05	1–0
Ružička (Liška, Žiak) (PP) – 26:47	2–0
Roman (Krivošík, Ivan) – 31:06	3–0
Fehérváry (Ružička, Fafrák) (PP) – 42:56	4–0

16 min
Penalties
43 min
36
Shots
15

18 April 2017; 15:30	Finland	6–3 (1–1, 3–1, 2–1)	Canada	Poprad Ice Stadium, Poprad; Attendance: 2,201

Game reference

Ukko-Pekka Luukkonen
Goalies
Ian Scott
Jake McGrath
Referees:
(Germany) Marc Iwert
(Russia) Artur Kulev
Linesmen:
(United States) William Hancock II
(Sweden) Emil Yletyinen

Vesalainen (PP) – 00:56	1–0
	1–1	03:55 – Studnicka (Brook)
Vesalainen (Vaakanainen, Heiskanen) – 20:30	2–1
Heiskanen (Ylönen) – 26:56	3–1
Virtanen (SH) – 32:37	4–1
	4–2	38:38 – Woo (Entwistle, Strome)
Engberg (Kotkaniemi) – 41:24	5–2
	5–3	51:18 – Entwistle (PP)
Vesalainen (Engberg) (ENG) – 58:22	6–3

8 min
Penalties
12 min
34
Shots
20

18 April 2017; 19:30	Switzerland	1–2 (0–0, 1–1, 0–1)	Slovakia	Poprad Ice Stadium, Poprad; Attendance: 4,496

Game reference

Akira Schmid
Goalies
Juraj Sklenár
Referees:
(Sweden) Mikael Holm
(United States) Stephen Thomson
Linesmen:
(France) Thomas Caillot
(Czech Republic) Jiří Ondráček

	0–1	31:20 – Fafrák (Ružička, Liška)
Kurashev (Hischier) – 32:04	1–1
	1–2	41:40 – Baláž (Korenčík)

2 min
Penalties
2 min
26
Shots
23

==== Group B ====
Pos	Team	Pld	W	OTW	OTL	L	GF	GA	GD	Pts	Qualification
1	United States	4	4	0	0	0	22	7	+15	12	Advance to Quarterfinals
2	Russia	4	2	1	0	1	16	11	+5	8	Advance to Quarterfinals
3	Sweden	4	2	0	0	2	8	12	−4	6	Advance to Quarterfinals
4	Czech Republic	4	1	0	1	2	15	17	−2	4	Advance to Quarterfinals
5	Belarus	4	0	0	0	4	7	21	−14	0	Advance to Relegation round

Source: IIHF

13 April 2017; 15:30	Belarus	0–7 (0–0, 0–5, 0–2)	United States	Spiš Aréna, Spišská Nová Ves; Attendance: 567

Game reference

Andrei Grischenko
Goalies
Dylan St. Cyr
Referees:
(Norway) Robert Hallin
(Czech Republic) Oldřich Hejduk
Linesmen:
(Latvia) Kriss Kupcus
(Slovakia) Lukáš Kacej

0–1	21:44 – Pastujov (Barratt, Gildon)
0–2	22:26 – Reedy (Farabee, Knoepke)
0–3	27:50 – Wahlstrom (Tkachuk, Barratt)
0–4	33:00 – Dhooghe (Farabee, Knoepke) (SH)
0–5	36:33 – Wahlstrom (Norris, Mismash)
0–6	42:34 – Mismash (Barratt, Pastujov)
0–7	44:55 – Farrance (Poehling, Reedy)

0 min
Penalties
8 min
17
Shots
51

13 April 2017; 19:30	Russia	3–1 (0–1, 0–0, 3–0)	Sweden	Spiš Aréna, Spišská Nová Ves; Attendance: 2,350

Game reference

Maxim Zhukov
Goalies
Olle Eriksson Ek
Referees:
(Germany) Marc Iwert
(United States) Stephen Thomson
Linesmen:
(Finland) Markus Hägerström
(Slovakia) Roman Výleta

	0–1	09:05 – Brännström (Lundeström, Hugg) (PP)
Maximov (Slepets) – 42:13	1–1
Svechnikov (Chekhovich) – 51:02	2–1
Svechnikov (Chekhovich) (ENG) – 59:58	3–1

12 min
Penalties
8 min
23
Shots
44

14 April 2017; 19:30	Czech Republic	7–4 (2–1, 4–1, 1–2)	Belarus	Spiš Aréna, Spišská Nová Ves; Attendance: 2,231

Game reference

Jakub Škarek
Goalies
Andrei Grischenko
Nikita Tolopilo
Referees:
(Finland) Lassi Heikkinen
(Austria) Manuel Nikolic
Linesmen:
(Canada) Michael Harrington
(South Korea) Park Jun-soo

Hrabík (Kvasnička, Nečas) (PP) – 02:13	1–0
Hladonik (Chytil, Bukač) (SH) – 05:41	2–0
	2–1	19:59 – Martynov (Savritski) (SH)
Kondelík (Škvrně, Šalda) – 30:25	3–1
Král (Zadina, Chytil) – 30:49	4–1
Kaut (Zadina) (PP) – 33:38	5–1
Kern (Galvas) – 34:01	6–1
	6–2	36:18 – Kot (Martynov)
Chytil (Nečas, Kondelík) – 50:17	7–2
	7–3	58:26 – Martynov (PS)
	7–4	59:51 – Baltruk

28 min
Penalties
32 min
45
Shots
33

15 April 2017; 15:30	United States	5–4 (0–1, 3–0, 2–3)	Russia	Spiš Aréna, Spišská Nová Ves; Attendance: 3,503

Game reference

Dylan St. Cyr
Goalies
Maxim Zhukov
Referees:
(Canada) Alexandre Garon
(Finland) Lassi Heikkinen
Linesmen:
(Canada) Michael Harrington
(Slovakia) Roman Výleta

	0–1	10:59 – Koltygin (Rubinchik, Toropchenko) (SH)
Mismash (Barratt, Pastujov) – 33:57	1–1
Poehling (Dhooghe, Farabee) – 36:28	2–1
Poehling (Miller, Knoepke) (SH) – 39:30	3–1
Norris (Tkachuk, Dhooghe) – 41:16	4–1
	4–2	45:19 – Bitsadze (Samorukov, Perelyayev)
Barratt (Mismash, Dhooghe) – 49:59	5–2
	5–3	56:33 – Slepets (Rubinchik, Lipanov) (PP)
	5–4	57:09 – Chekhovich (Svechnikov, Koltygin)

10 min
Penalties
10 min
32
Shots
28

15 April 2017; 19:30	Sweden	3–2 (1–0, 1–1, 1–1)	Czech Republic	Spiš Aréna, Spišská Nová Ves; Attendance: 3,126

Game reference

Adam Åhman
Goalies
Jakub Škarek
Referees:
(Switzerland) Alex Dipietro
(Russia) Artur Kulev
Linesmen:
(Finland) Markus Hägerström
(Slovakia) Lukáš Kacej

Peterson (Elvenes, Westerlund) – 03:40	1–0
Zetterlund – 20:35	2–0
	2–1	37:30 – Zadina (Kvasnička, Kondelík) (PP)
	2–2	46:08 – Kern (Safin)
Gustafsson (Ginning) – 47:30	3–2

14 min
Penalties
24 min
38
Shots
34

16 April 2017; 19:30	Belarus	2–3 (1–2, 1–0, 0–1)	Sweden	Spiš Aréna, Spišská Nová Ves; Attendance: 1,503

Game reference

Andrei Grischenko
Goalies
Olle Eriksson Ek
Referees:
(Germany) Marc Iwert
(United Kingdom) Liam Sewell
Linesmen:
(Finland) Markus Hägerström
(Latvia) Kriss Kupcus

	0–1	01:12 – Gustafsson (Zetterlund)
	0–2	04:09 – Miketinac (Peterson)
Yeryomenko (Kot, Martynov) – 12:38	1–2
Baltruk (Pavlenko, Drozdov) – 33:11	2–2
	2–3	59:48 – Bemström (Hugg, Lundeström) (PP)

8 min
Penalties
8 min
14
Shots
52

17 April 2017; 15:30	United States	5–2 (2–1, 2–1, 1–0)	Czech Republic	Spiš Aréna, Spišská Nová Ves; Attendance: 3,856

Game reference

Dylan St. Cyr
Goalies
Jakub Škarek
Jiri Patera
Referees:
(Sweden) Mikael Holm
(Croatia) Trpimir Piragić
Linesmen:
(Canada) Michael Harrington
(Slovakia) Lukáš Kacej

	0–1	01:51 – Machala (Kern)
Tkachuck (Kemp) (SH) – 12:24	1–1
Gildon (Mismash) – 13:46	2–1
Tortora (Farrance) – 23:43	3–1
Gildon (Cockerill, Tortora) – 31:22	4–1
	4–2	31:50 – Safin (Kern, Machala)
Gildon (Hughes, Wahlstrom) (PP) – 58:00	5–2

20 min
Penalties
18 min
23
Shots
26

17 April 2017; 19:30	Russia	4–1 (0–0, 2–1, 2–0)	Belarus	Spiš Aréna, Spišská Nová Ves; Attendance: 1,123

Game reference

Kirill Ustimenko
Goalies
Andrei Grischenko
Referees:
(Switzerland) Alex Dipietro
(Czech Republic) Oldřich Hejduk
Linesmen:
(Latvia) Kriss Kupcus
(Slovakia) Roman Výleta

	0–1	26:12 – Anosov (Azhgirei)
Chekhovich (Lipanov, Svechnikov) (PP) – 28:11	1–1
Slepets – 29:28	2–1
Svechnikov (Rubinchik) – 50:11	3–1
Chekhovich (Samorukov) (PP) – 55:01	4–1

16 min
Penalties
12 min
34
Shots
32

18 April 2017; 15:30	Sweden	1–5 (0–2, 1–1, 0–2)	United States	Spiš Aréna, Spišská Nová Ves; Attendance: 2,354

Game reference

Adam Åhman
Goalies
Dylan St. Cyr
Referees:
(Finland) Lassi Heikkinen
(Austria) Manuel Nikolic
Linesmen:
(Finland) Markus Hägerström
(Slovakia) Roman Výleta

	0–1	08:40 – Dhooghe (Pastujov, Cockerill)
	0–2	19:37 – Wahlstrom (Mismash, Gildon)
	0–3	22:40 – Farabee (PS)
Westerlund (Brännström, Elvenes) (PP) – 39:01	1–3
	1–4	50:45 – Poehling (Dhooghe) (SH)
	1–5	58:05 – Wahlstrom (Hughes) (PP)

8 min
Penalties
14 min
36
Shots
29

18 April 2017; 19:30	Czech Republic	4–5 OT (1–1, 1–1, 2–2); OT: (0–1)	Russia	Spiš Aréna, Spišská Nová Ves; Attendance: 2,764

Game reference

Jiri Patera
Goalies
Maxim Zhukov
Referees:
(Canada) Alexandre Garon
(Norway) Robert Hallin
Linesmen:
(Canada) Michael Harrington
(Latvia) Kriss Kupcus

	0–1	10:48 – Rubinchik (Galenyuk, Bitsadze) (PP)
Kvasnička (Kondelík, Safin) (EA) – 17:21	1–1
	1–2	29:31 – Shashkov (Baranov)
Zadina (Chytil) (PP) – 33:43	2–2
	2–3	43:23 – Svechnikov (Lipanov, Chekhovich)
Hrabík (Král, Kaut) (EA) – 44:43	3–3
Kern (Kvasnička, Kondelík) – 48:40	4–3
	4–4	57:55 – Maximov (Slepets, Rubinchik)
	4–5	64:06 – Rubinchik (Muranov, Koltygin)

18 min
Penalties
10 min
38
Shots
32

=== Relegation round ===
20 April 2017; 11:30	Belarus	2–0 (0–0, 1–0, 1–0)	Latvia	Spiš Aréna, Spišská Nová Ves; Attendance: 356

Game reference
Andrei Grischenko	Goalies	Niklavs Rauza	Referees: (Canada) Alexandre Garon (Norway) Robert Hallin; Linesmen: (Canada) Michael Harrington (Slovakia) Lukáš Kacej
Martynov (Yeryomenko, Gabrus) – 38:53 / 1–0; Yeryomenko (Baltruk) (SH, ENG) – 59:23 / 2–0			Referees: (Canada) Alexandre Garon (Norway) Robert Hallin; Linesmen: (Canada) Michael Harrington (Slovakia) Lukáš Kacej
16 min	Penalties	6 min	Referees: (Canada) Alexandre Garon (Norway) Robert Hallin; Linesmen: (Canada) Michael Harrington (Slovakia) Lukáš Kacej
31	Shots	17	Referees: (Canada) Alexandre Garon (Norway) Robert Hallin; Linesmen: (Canada) Michael Harrington (Slovakia) Lukáš Kacej

21 April 2017; 17:30	Latvia	3–2 (1–0, 1–1, 1–1)	Belarus	Spiš Aréna, Spišská Nová Ves; Attendance: 309

Game reference

Niklavs Rauza
Goalies
Andrei Grischenko
Referees:
(Canada) Alexandre Garon
(Croatia) Trpimir Piragić
Linesmen:
(Slovakia) Lukáš Kacej
(South Korea) Park Jun-soo

Egle (Bērziņš, Krollis) (PP) – 08:23	1–0
	1–1	30:19 – Sapego (Drozdov, Yeryomenko)
Smirnovs (Paškausks, Egle) – 37:06	2–1
	2–2	49:58 – Pavlenko (Sapego, Baltruk) (PP)
Egle (Jašunovs, Bērziņš) – 55:07	3–2

20 min
Penalties
10 min
25
Shots
33

23 April 2017; 13:30	Belarus	3–1 (2–0, 0–0, 1–1)	Latvia	Spiš Aréna, Spišská Nová Ves; Attendance: 131

Game reference

Andrei Grischenko
Goalies
Niklavs Rauza
Referees:
(Germany) Marc Iwert
(United Kingdom) Liam Sewell
Linesmen:
(France) Thomas Caillot
(Czech Republic) Jiří Ondráček

Drozdov (Martynov, Borshov) – 06:27	1–0
Deryabin (Martynov) – 19:25	2–0
Pavlenko (Borshov, Savritski) – 44:00	3–0
	3–1	50:33 – Jašunovs (Kārkls, Smirnovs) (PP2)

20 min
Penalties
2 min
25
Shots
24

- Latvia is relegated to the 2018 Division I A.

=== Playoff round ===
Quarterfinals
1A	Finland	6
4B	Czech Republic	5
2B	Russia	3
3A	Slovakia	2
1B	United States	4
4A	Switzerland	2
2A	Canada	3
3B	Sweden	7

Semifinals
1A	Finland	2
2B	Russia	1
1B	United States	4
3B	Sweden	3

Finals
1A	Finland	2
1B	United States	4
Bronze medal game
2B	Russia	3
3B	Sweden	0

==== Quarterfinals ====
20 April 2017; 13:30	Finland	6–5 OT (4–1, 1–3, 0–1); OT: (1–0)	Czech Republic	Poprad Ice Stadium Poprad; Attendance: 1,194

Game reference

Ukko-Pekka Luukkonen
Goalies
Jakub Škarek
Jiri Patera
Referees:
(Russia) Artur Kulev
(Austria) Manuel Nikolic
Linesmen:
(Latvia) Kriss Kupcus
(Sweden) Emil Yletyinen

Heiskanen (Vaakanainen, Vesalainen) – 02:19	1–0
	1–1	07:11 – Mikyska (Hrabík, Dvořák)
Nyman (Vesalainen) – 14:09	2–1
Vaakanainen (Ikonen, Heiskanen) (PP) – 18:26	3–1
Talvitie (Heiskanen, Ylönen) – 19:14	4–1
Talvitie (Virtanen, Ylönen) – 25:24	5–1
	5–2	27:02 – Chytil (Zadina, Safin) (PP)
	5–3	32:00 – Škvrně (Kondelík, Mikyska)
	5–4	38:35 – Machala (Nečas, Kvasnička) (PP)
	5–5	57:23 – Zadina (Hladonik, Hrabík)
Virtanen (Heiskanen, Ylönen) – 69:02	6–5

12 min
Penalties
12 min
38
Shots
47

20 April 2017; 15:30	Canada	3–7 (0–1, 2–3, 1–3)	Sweden	Spiš Aréna, Spišská Nová Ves; Attendance: 2,259

Game reference

Ian Scott
Goalies
Adam Åhman
Referees:
(Switzerland) Alex Dipietro
(United States) Stephen Thomson
Linesmen:
(Finland) Markus Hägerström
(Slovakia) Roman Výleta

	0–1	19:57 – Zetterlund
Strome – 21:58	1–1
	1–2	30:36 – Back (Hugg, Zetterlund)
	1–3	33:33 – Olofsson (Lundeström)
Entwistle (Brook) – 34:38	2–3
	2–4	39:38 – Hugg (Liljegren, Brännström) (PP)
	2–5	44:20 – Olofsson
	2–6	48:30 – Brännström (Elvenes, Fjellström)
Comtois – 54:07	3–6
	3–7	57:53 – Lundeström (ENG)

8 min
Penalties
2 min
28
Shots
34

20 April 2017; 17:30	Russia	3–2 OT (1–0, 0–2, 1–0); OT: (1–0)	Slovakia	Poprad Ice Stadium Poprad; Attendance: 4,496

Game reference

Maxim Zhukov
Goalies
Juraj Sklenár
Referees:
(Sweden) Mikael Holm
(Croatia) Trpimir Piragić
Linesmen:
(France) Thomas Caillot
(United States) William Hancock II

Chekhovich (Svechnikov) – 05:36	1–0
	1–1	30:35 – Ružička (Liška, Baláž)
	1–2	34:02 – Fafrák (Liška)
Chekhovich (Svechnikov, Samorukov) (PP) – 41:14	2–2
Slepets (Koltygin, Samorukov) – 68:42	3–2

6 min
Penalties
2 min
42
Shots
41

20 April 2017; 19:30	United States	4–2 (1–0, 1–2, 2–0)	Switzerland	Spiš Aréna, Spišská Nová Ves; Attendance: 2,342

Game reference

Dylan St. Cyr
Goalies
Akira Schmid
Referees:
(Czech Republic) Oldřich Hejduk
(United Kingdom) Liam Sewell
Linesmen:
(Czech Republic) Jiří Ondráček
(South Korea) Park Jun-soo

Pastujov (Tkachuk, Norris) – 00:51	1–0
	1–1	23:51 – Hischier (Gross)
	1–2	30:49 – Müller (Patry, Sigrist) (PP)
Farrance (Barratt, Tkachuk) – 34:02	2–2
Norris (Pastujov, Tkachuk) – 56:43	3–2
Tortora (Dhooghe, Kemp) – 57:10	4–2

6 min
Penalties
20 min
47
Shots
17

==== Semifinals ====
22 April 2017; 15:30	Finland	2–1 OT (0–0, 1–0, 0–1); OT: (1–0)	Russia	Poprad Ice Stadium Poprad; Attendance: 2,936

Game reference

Ukko-Pekka Luukkonen
Goalies
Maxim Zhukov
Referees:
(Switzerland) Alex Dipietro
(Austria) Manuel Nikolic
Linesmen:
(United States) William Hancock II
(Slovakia) Roman Výleta

Ylönen (Virtanen, Kotkaniemi) (PP) – 25:14	1–0
	1–1	41:37 – Slepets (Toropchenko)
Utunen (Anttalainen, Kupari) – 67:01	2–1

6 min
Penalties
10 min
34
Shots
29

22 April 2017; 19:30	United States	4–3 OT (1–0, 1–1, 1–2); OT: (1–0)	Sweden	Poprad Ice Stadium Poprad; Attendance: 2,732

Game reference

Dylan St. Cyr
Goalies
Adam Åhman
Referees:
(Finland) Lassi Heikkinen
(Russia) Artur Kulev
Linesmen:
(Latvia) Kriss Kupcus
(Czech Republic) Jiří Ondráček

Pastujov (Dhooghe, Miller) – 10:28	1–0
	1–1	20:39 – Olofsson (Bemström, Lundeström)
Gildon (Mismash, Hughes) (PP) – 26:29	2–1
	2–2	44:11 – Zetterlund (Brännström, Liljegren) (PP)
	2–3	46:46 – Sylvegård (Johansson)
Hughes (Norris) – 47:50	3–3
Dhooghe (Poehling) – 69:39	4–3

10 min
Penalties
8 min
44
Shots
29

==== Bronze medal game ====
23 April 2017; 15:30	Russia	3–0 (1–0, 1–0, 1–0)	Sweden	Poprad Ice Stadium Poprad; Attendance: 2,923

Game reference

Kirill Ustimenko
Goalies
Adam Åhman
Referees:
(Czech Republic) Oldřich Hejduk
(United States) Stephen Thomson
Linesmen:
(Finland) Markus Hägerström
(United States) William Hancock II

Galenyuk (Chekhovich, Svechnikov) (PP) – 16:27	1–0
Samorukov – 24:21	2–0
Maximov (ENG) – 59:45	3–0

4 min
Penalties
4 min
24
Shots
30

==== Final ====
23 April 2017; 19:30	United States	4–2 (2–0, 2–1, 0–1)	Finland	Poprad Ice Stadium Poprad; Attendance: 3,904

Game reference

Dylan St. Cyr
Goalies
Ukko-Pekka Luukkonen
Referees:
(Canada) Alexandre Garon
(Croatia) Trpimir Piragić
Linesmen:
(Canada) Michael Harrington
(Sweden) Emil Yletyinen

Norris (Tkachuk) – 03:51	1–0
Farabee (Tortora) – 16:47	2–0
Farabee (Cockerill, St. Cyr) (SH) – 21:03	3–0
	3–1	27:05 – Räsänen (Koskenkorva, Kotkaniemi)
Mismash (Hughes, Norris) (PP) – 31:03	4–1
	4–2	56:44 – Vaakanainen (EA)

24 min
Penalties
10 min
25
Shots
24

=== Scoring leaders ===
List shows the top ten skaters sorted by points, then goals.

Player	GP	G	A	Pts	+/−	PIM
(Finland) Kristian Vesalainen	7	6	7	13	+5	8
(Finland) Miro Heiskanen	7	2	10	12	+8	0
(Russia) Ivan Chekhovich	7	5	4	9	+3	4
(Russia) Andrei Svechnikov	7	4	5	9	+3	10
(Finland) Jesse Ylönen	7	4	5	9	+6	0
(United States) Sean Dhooghe	7	3	6	9	+8	2
(Finland) Joni Ikonen	7	4	4	8	+4	8
(United States) Grant Mismash	7	3	5	8	+4	10
(Canada) MacKenzie Entwistle	5	4	3	7	+1	6
(Finland) Aarne Talvitie	7	4	3	7	+1	6

GP = Games played; G = Goals; A = Assists; Pts = Points; +/− = Plus–minus; PIM = Penalties In Minutes
Source: IIHF.com

=== Leading goaltenders ===
Only the top five goaltenders, based on save percentage, who have played 40% of their team's minutes are included in this list.

Player	TOI	SA	GA	GAA	Sv%	SO
(Russia) Maxim Zhukov	319:19	189	14	2.63	92.59	0
(United States) Dylan St. Cyr	429:39	177	14	1.96	92.09	1
(Latvia) Niklavs Rauza	316:49	193	17	3.22	91.19	0
(Belarus) Andrei Grischenko	416:38	243	23	3.31	90.53	1
(Switzerland) Akira Schmid	153:16	92	9	3.52	90.22	0

TOI = Time On Ice (minutes:seconds); SA = Shots against; GA = Goals against; GAA = Goals against average; Sv% = Save percentage; SO = Shutouts
Source: IIHF.com

=== Tournament awards ===
Most Valuable Player

- Forward: (Finland) Kristian Vesalainen

All-star team

- Goaltender: (United States) Dylan St. Cyr
- Defencemen: (Finland) Miro Heiskanen, (United States) Max Gildon
- Forwards: (Finland) Kristian Vesalainen, (United States) Sean Dhooghe, (Russia) Ivan Chekhovich

Source: IIHF.com

IIHF best player awards

- Goaltender: (Russia) Maxim Zhukov
- Defenceman: (Finland) Miro Heiskanen
- Forward: (Finland) Kristian Vesalainen

Source: IIHF.com

=== Final standings ===
Rank	Team
1st place, gold medalist(s)	United States
2nd place, silver medalist(s)	Finland
3rd place, bronze medalist(s)	Russia
4th	Sweden
5th	Canada
6th	Slovakia
7th	Czech Republic
8th	Switzerland
9th	Belarus
10th	Latvia

Relegated to the 2018 Division I A

== Division I ==
=== Division I A ===
The Division I A tournament was played in Bled, Slovenia, from 7 to 13 April 2017.

Pos	Team	Pld	W	OTW	OTL	L	GF	GA	GD	Pts	Promotion or relegation
1	France	5	4	0	0	1	17	14	+3	12	Promoted to the 2018 Top Division
2	Kazakhstan	5	3	1	0	1	18	8	+10	11	
3	Denmark	5	3	0	1	1	17	15	+2	10	
4	Norway	5	2	1	0	2	22	13	+9	8	
5	Germany	5	1	0	1	3	23	21	+2	4	
6	Hungary	5	0	0	0	5	6	32	−26	0	Relegated to the 2018 Division I B

Source: IIHF
Rules for classification: 1) points; 2) head-to-head points; 3) head-to-head goal difference; 4) head-to-head number of goals scored; 5) result against closest best-ranked team outside tied teams; 6) result against second-best ranked team outside tied teams; 7) seeding before tournament.

=== Division I B ===
The Division I B tournament was played in Bled, Slovenia, from 15 to 21 April 2017.

Pos	Team	Pld	W	OTW	OTL	L	GF	GA	GD	Pts	Promotion or relegation
1	Slovenia (H)	5	4	0	0	1	22	8	+14	12	Promoted to the 2018 Division I A
2	Austria	5	2	2	0	1	14	13	+1	10	
3	Japan	5	1	2	1	1	15	23	−8	8	
4	Italy	5	2	0	1	2	17	17	0	7	
5	Ukraine	5	1	1	1	2	15	15	0	6	
6	Poland	5	0	0	2	3	9	16	−7	2	Relegated to the 2018 Division II A

Source: IIHF
Rules for classification: 1) points; 2) head-to-head points; 3) head-to-head goal difference; 4) head-to-head number of goals scored; 5) result against closest best-ranked team outside tied teams; 6) result against second-best ranked team outside tied teams; 7) seeding before tournament.
(H) Host

== Division II ==
=== Division II A ===
The Division II A tournament was played in Gangneung, South Korea, from 2 to 8 April 2017.

Pos	Team	Pld	W	OTW	OTL	L	GF	GA	GD	Pts	Promotion or relegation
1	Romania	5	4	0	1	0	20	8	+12	13	Promoted to the 2018 Division I B
2	Estonia	5	1	3	0	1	17	16	+1	9	
3	Lithuania	5	2	1	0	2	15	12	+3	8	
4	South Korea (H)	5	2	0	1	2	13	13	0	7 (Note: South Korea 3–2 Great Britain)	
5	Great Britain	5	2	0	1	2	18	17	+1	7	
6	Croatia	5	0	0	1	4	9	26	−17	1	Relegated to the 2018 Division II B

Source: IIHF
Rules for classification: 1) points; 2) head-to-head points; 3) head-to-head goal difference; 4) head-to-head number of goals scored; 5) result against closest best-ranked team outside tied teams; 6) result against second-best-ranked team outside tied teams; 7) seeding before tournament.
(H) Host

=== Division II B ===
The Division II B tournament was played in Belgrade, Serbia, from 13 to 19 March 2017.

Pos	Team	Pld	W	OTW	OTL	L	GF	GA	GD	Pts	Promotion or relegation
1	Australia	5	4	0	0	1	19	7	+12	12 (Note: Spain 1–4 Australia)	Promoted to the 2018 Division II A
2	Spain	5	4	0	0	1	24	10	+14	12	
3	Serbia (H)	5	3	0	0	2	14	13	+1	9 (Note: Serbia 3–2 Netherlands)	
4	Netherlands	5	3	0	0	2	16	12	+4	9	
5	Iceland	5	1	0	0	4	8	23	−15	3	
6	Belgium	5	0	0	0	5	7	23	−16	0	Relegated to the 2018 Division III A

Source: IIHF
Rules for classification: 1) points; 2) head-to-head points; 3) head-to-head goal difference; 4) head-to-head number of goals scored; 5) result against closest best-ranked team outside tied teams; 6) result against second-best ranked team outside tied teams; 7) seeding before tournament.
(H) Host

== Division III ==
=== Division III A ===
The Division III A tournament was played in Taipei, Taiwan, from 21 to 27 March 2017.

Pos	Team	Pld	W	OTW	OTL	L	GF	GA	GD	Pts	Promotion or relegation
1	China	5	5	0	0	0	36	1	+35	15	Promoted to the 2018 Division II B
2	Israel	5	4	0	0	1	21	8	+13	12	
3	Chinese Taipei (H)	5	2	1	0	2	16	13	+3	8	
4	Bulgaria	5	2	0	0	3	18	18	0	6	
5	Turkey	5	1	0	0	4	19	39	−20	3	
6	New Zealand	5	0	0	1	4	11	42	−31	1	Relegated to the 2018 Division III B

Source: IIHF
Rules for classification: 1) points; 2) head-to-head points; 3) head-to-head goal difference; 4) head-to-head number of goals scored; 5) result against closest best-ranked team outside tied teams; 6) result against second-best ranked team outside tied teams; 7) seeding before tournament.
(H) Host

=== Division III B ===
The Division III B tournament was played in Mexico City, Mexico, from 17 to 19 March 2017.

Pos	Team	Pld	W	OTW	OTL	L	GF	GA	GD	Pts	Promotion
1	Mexico (H)	2	2	0	0	0	18	3	+15	6	Promoted to the 2018 Division III A
2	Hong Kong	2	1	0	0	1	4	13	−9	3	
3	South Africa	2	0	0	0	2	4	10	−6	0	

Source: IIHF
Rules for classification: 1) points; 2) head-to-head points; 3) head-to-head goal difference; 4) head-to-head number of goals scored; 5) result against closest best-ranked team outside tied teams; 6) result against second-best ranked team outside tied teams; 7) seeding before tournament.
(H) Host
