= Joni Ikonen =

Finnish ice hockey player

- Born: 14 April 1999 (age 27) Espoo, Finland
- Height: 5 ft 11 in (180 cm)
- Weight: 172 lb (78 kg; 12 st 4 lb)
- Position: Centre
- Shoots: Right
- Liiga team Former teams: Kiekko-Espoo; Frölunda HC; KalPa; Ilves; Lahti Pelicans; HIFK
- NHL draft: 58th overall, 2017; Montreal Canadiens
- Playing career: 2016–present

Joni Ikonen (born 14 April 1999) is a Finnish professional ice hockey forward currently playing for Kiekko-Espoo of Liiga. He was selected in the second round, 58th overall, by the Montreal Canadiens in the 2017 NHL entry draft.

== Playing career ==
Ikonen originally played as a youth in his native Finland, appearing at the Junior C and Junior B levels with the Blues before opting to continue his development in Sweden with Frölunda for the 2015–16 season, alongside fellow countryman Kristian Vesalainen. Ikonen made his professional debut at the senior level with Frölunda in the Swedish Hockey League during the 2016–17 season. After the season, he left the team due to contract disputes, and on 19 July 2017, signed with KalPa of the Finnish Liiga.

After two seasons with Ilves, Ikonen left to sign a one-year contract with fellow Liiga outfit, Lahti Pelicans, on 29 April 2022.

Having left HIFK as a free agent, on 8 May 2024, Ikonen joined his third Liiga club in as many seasons, signing a one-year contract with newly promoted Kiekko-Espoo for the 2024–25 campaign.

== Personal ==
Ikonen's older brother, Juuso, most recently played for Porin Ässät in the Liiga.

== Career statistics ==
=== Regular season and playoffs ===
			Regular season					Playoffs
Season	Team	League	GP	G	A	Pts	PIM	GP	G	A	Pts	PIM
2015–16	Frölunda HC	J18	21	17	10	27	4	—	—	—	—	—
2016–17	Frölunda HC	J20	40	22	19	41	42	5	3	0	3	2
2016–17	Frölunda HC	SHL	10	0	0	0	0	—	—	—	—	—
2017–18	KalPa	Liiga	52	4	10	14	8	6	0	1	1	4
2018–19	KalPa	Liiga	13	5	5	10	6	—	—	—	—	—
2020–21	Ilves	Liiga	23	2	3	5	8	5	0	0	0	0
2021–22	Ilves	Liiga	59	9	19	28	14	11	1	1	2	0
2022–23	Lahti Pelicans	Liiga	56	19	14	33	12	18	2	7	9	6
2023–24	HIFK	Liiga	45	2	15	17	10	1	0	0	0	0
SHL totals			10	0	0	0	0	—	—	—	—	—
Liiga totals			245	41	66	107	58	41	3	9	12	10

Medal record

Representing Finland

Ice hockey

IIHF World U18 Championship
Silver medal – second place	2017 Slovakia	

=== International ===
Year	Team	Event	Result	GP	G	A	Pts	PIM
2015	Finland	U17	5th	5	1	5	6	20
2017	Finland	U18	2nd place, silver medalist(s)	7	4	4	8	8
2018	Finland	WJC	6th	5	1	1	2	0
Junior totals				17	6	10	16	28
