= Jett Woo =

Canadian ice hockey player (born 2000)

- Born: July 27, 2000 (age 26) Winnipeg, Manitoba, Canada
- Height: 6 ft 0 in (183 cm)
- Weight: 205 lb (93 kg; 14 st 9 lb)
- Position: Defence
- Shoots: Right
- NHL team (P) Cur. team: Anaheim Ducks; San Diego Gulls (AHL)
- NHL draft: 37th overall, 2018; Vancouver Canucks
- Playing career: 2021–present

Jett Woo (born July 27, 2000) is a Canadian professional ice hockey defenceman who currently plays for the San Diego Gulls of the American Hockey League (AHL), while under contract to the Anaheim Ducks of the National Hockey League (NHL). He was selected 37th overall in the 2018 NHL entry draft by the Vancouver Canucks, in whose organization he spent the first several seasons of his career. He won the Calder Cup with the Abbotsford Canucks in 2025.

== Playing career ==
During the 2018–19 season, his fourth season with the Moose Jaw Warriors, Woo was signed to a three-year, entry-level contract with the Vancouver Canucks on March 17, 2019.

At the 2019 WHL Bantam Draft on May 2, 2019, Woo was traded from Moose Jaw to the Calgary Hitmen in exchange for defenceman Vladislav Yeryomenko, forward Ryder Korczak, the 11th overall selection in the 2019 WHL Bantam Draft, and a second-round pick in 2021.

On June 23, 2025, Woo won the Calder Cup as a member of the Abbotsford Canucks.

On March 5, 2026, Woo was traded by the Canucks to the San Jose Sharks in exchange for Jack Thompson. He played out the remainder of the 2025–26 season with the Sharks' AHL affiliate, the San Jose Barracuda, posting 2 points through 17 regular season games.

Woo left the Sharks having concluded his contract as a free agent and was signed to a two-year, two-way contract with the Anaheim Ducks on July 1, 2026.

== Personal life ==
He is of Chinese and German descent.

== Career statistics ==
=== Regular season and playoffs ===
			Regular season					Playoffs
Season	Team	League	GP	G	A	Pts	PIM	GP	G	A	Pts	PIM
2015–16	Moose Jaw Warriors	WHL	7	0	1	1	2	5	0	1	1	0
2016–17	Moose Jaw Warriors	WHL	65	5	17	22	37	7	0	3	3	4
2017–18	Moose Jaw Warriors	WHL	44	9	16	25	33	14	2	1	3	6
2018–19	Moose Jaw Warriors	WHL	62	12	54	66	70	4	0	1	1	4
2019–20	Calgary Hitmen	WHL	64	7	39	46	88	—	—	—	—	—
2020–21	Utica Comets	AHL	28	3	2	5	18	—	—	—	—	—
2021–22	Abbotsford Canucks	AHL	42	2	6	8	35	2	0	0	0	0
2022–23	Abbotsford Canucks	AHL	68	7	14	21	96	6	0	0	0	6
2023–24	Abbotsford Canucks	AHL	62	7	24	31	93	—	—	—	—	—
2024–25	Abbotsford Canucks	AHL	67	2	16	18	90	22	1	5	6	12
2025–26	Abbotsford Canucks	AHL	26	1	7	8	78	—	—	—	—	—
2025–26	San Jose Barracuda	AHL	17	1	1	2	14	2	0	1	1	4
AHL totals			310	23	70	93	424	32	1	6	7	22

Medal record

Representing Canada

Ice hockey

Ivan Hlinka Memorial Tournament
Gold medal – first place	2017 Czech Republic/Slovakia	

=== International ===
Year	Team	Event	Result	GP	G	A	Pts	PIM
2016	Canada White	U17	4th	6	1	3	4	4
2017	Canada	IH18	1st place, gold medalist(s)	5	0	0	0	6
2017	Canada	U18	5th	5	1	1	2	2
Junior totals				16	2	4	6	12

== Awards and honours ==
Award	Year	Ref
AHL
Calder Cup Champion	2025	
