= Adam Liška =

Slovak ice hockey player (born 1999)

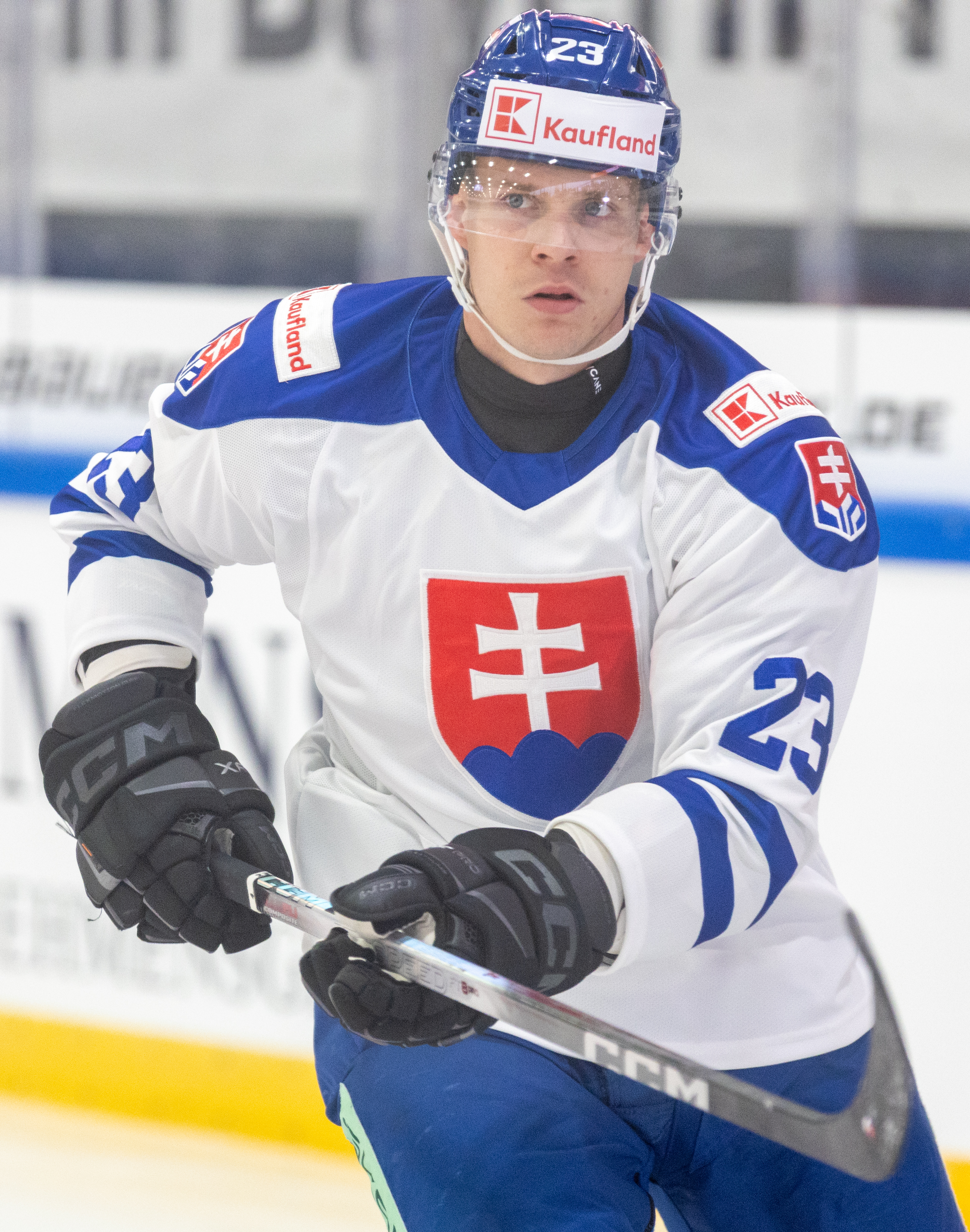
- Liška in 2026
- Born: 14 October 1999 (age 26) Bratislava, Slovakia
- Height: 5 ft 10 in (178 cm)
- Weight: 183 lb (83 kg; 13 st 1 lb)
- Position: Left wing
- Shoots: Left
- KHL team Former teams: Severstal Cherepovets; HC Slovan Bratislava
- National team: Slovakia
- NHL draft: Undrafted
- Playing career: 2016–present

Adam Liška (born 14 October 1999) is a Slovak professional ice hockey player who is a left winger for Severstal Cherepovets of the Kontinental Hockey League (KHL).

== Playing career ==
Liška played as a youth in his native Slovakia, playing within HC Slovan Bratislava junior teams. Selected by the Kitchener Rangers of the Ontario Hockey League, 34th overall, in the 2017 CHL Import Draft, Liška opted to continue his development in North America during the 2017–18 season.

After posting 31 points in 62 games with the Rangers, Liška went undrafted in the 2018 NHL entry draft and opted to return to Slovakia with Slovan Bratislava. Liška made his KHL debut in the 2018–19 season, appearing in 52 games as a rookie to contribute with 4 goals and 10 points.

With Bratislava's return to the Slovak Extraliga, Liška decided to continue in the KHL, signing a one-year contract with Russian club, Severstal Cherepovets, on 1 July 2019.

== International play ==
On 9 February 2019, Liška made his senior national team debut in Slovakia Cup match against Russia B. He was selected to participate in 2019 IIHF World Championship.

== Career statistics ==
=== Regular season and playoffs ===
			Regular season					Playoffs
Season	Team	League	GP	G	A	Pts	PIM	GP	G	A	Pts	PIM
2015–16	Team Slovakia U18	Slovak-Jr.	43	13	15	28	8	—	—	—	—	—
2015–16	HC Slovan Bratislava	Slovak-Jr.	0	0	0	0	0	12	5	5	10	4
2016–17	Team Slovakia U18	Slovak-Jr.	23	13	16	29	4	—	—	—	—	—
2016–17	HK Orange 20	Slovak	14	1	1	2	4	—	—	—	—	—
2016–17	HK Orange 20	Slovak.1	4	0	2	2	2	—	—	—	—	—
2016–17	HC Slovan Bratislava	Slovak-Jr.	2	1	1	2	0	11	6	12	18	4
2017–18	Kitchener Rangers	OHL	62	12	19	31	6	19	0	3	3	4
2018–19	HC Slovan Bratislava	Slovak-Jr.	1	0	0	0	0	—	—	—	—	—
2018–19	HC Slovan Bratislava	KHL	52	4	6	10	8	—	—	—	—	—
2019–20	Severstal Cherepovets	KHL	51	8	3	11	8	—	—	—	—	—
2020–21	Severstal Cherepovets	KHL	48	6	10	16	6	5	0	3	3	2
2021–22	Severstal Cherepovets	KHL	47	8	11	19	6	7	1	1	2	6
2022–23	Severstal Cherepovets	KHL	64	11	14	25	12	5	1	1	2	0
2023–24	Severstal Cherepovets	KHL	67	13	23	36	15	5	1	0	1	4
2024–25	Severstal Cherepovets	KHL	58	8	12	20	4	—	—	—	—	—
2025–26	Severstal Cherepovets	KHL	45	19	16	35	6	5	3	0	3	0
KHL totals			432	77	95	172	65	27	6	5	11	12

=== International ===
Year	Team	Event	Result	GP	G	A	Pts	PIM
2016	Slovakia	U18	5th	5	1	0	1	0
2016	Slovakia	IH18	7th	4	1	3	4	0
2017	Slovakia	U18	6th	5	2	4	6	0
2018	Slovakia	WJC	7th	5	1	0	1	0
2019	Slovakia	WJC	8th	5	2	3	5	0
2019	Slovakia	WC	9th	7	2	1	3	2
2021	Slovakia	WC	8th	8	0	0	0	2
2022	Slovakia	WC	8th	8	1	3	4	0
2024	Slovakia	OGQ	Q	3	1	1	2	0
2026	Slovakia	OG	4th	6	0	2	2	0
2026	Slovakia	WC	9th	7	2	3	5	0
Junior totals				24	7	10	17	0
Senior totals				39	6	10	16	4
