= Ostap Safin =

Czech-born Russian ice hockey player

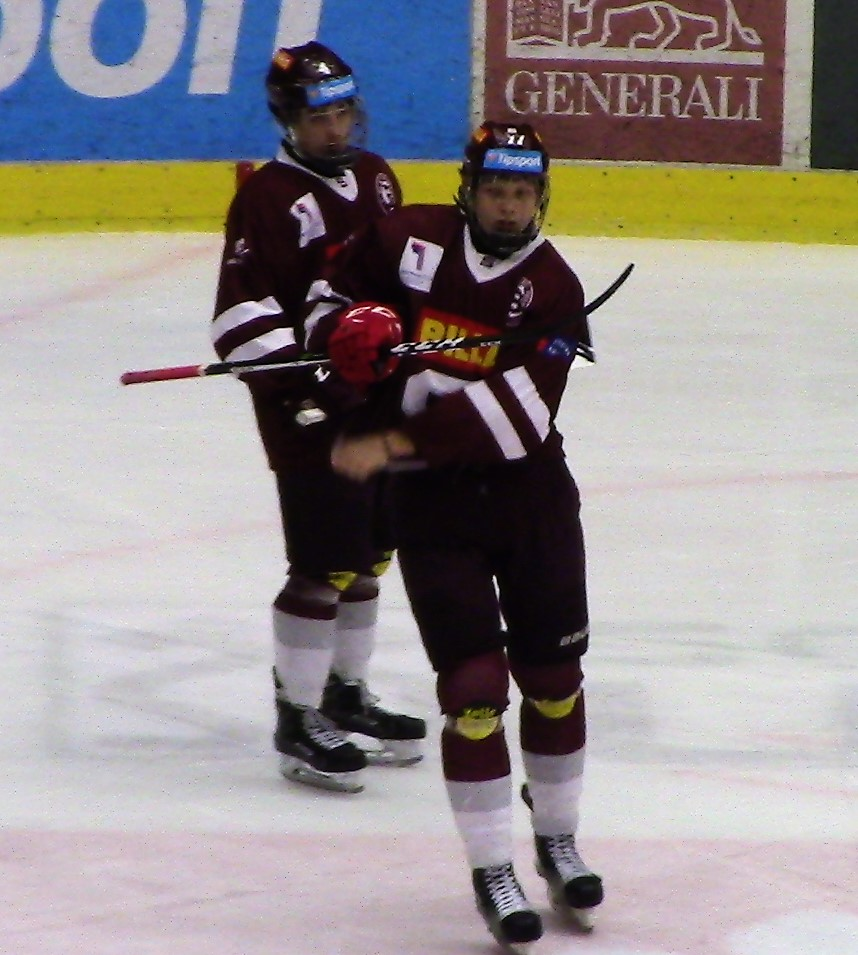
- Safin with Sparta Praha in 2017
- Born: 11 February 1999 (age 27) Prague, Czech Republic
- Height: 6 ft 5 in (196 cm)
- Weight: 204 lb (93 kg; 14 st 8 lb)
- Position: Right wing
- Shoots: Left
- KHL team Former teams: Lada Togliatti; HC Sparta Praha; Bakersfield Condors; Traktor Chelyabinsk; Admiral Vladivostok; Shanghai Dragons; HK Dukla Trenčín
- NHL draft: 115th overall, 2017; Edmonton Oilers
- Playing career: 2016–present

Ostap Safin (born 11 February 1999) is a Czech professional ice hockey forward who plays for HC Lada Togliatti of the Kontinental Hockey League (KHL).

== Playing career ==
Safin made his Czech Extraliga debut playing with Sparta Prague during the 2015–16 Czech Extraliga season.

Safin was drafted by the Edmonton Oilers in the 4th round, 115th overall, in the 2017 NHL entry draft. Shortly after this, he was picked 53rd overall by the Saint John Sea Dogs of the QMJHL in the 2017 CHL Import Draft. After this, he made the move to North America to play for the Sea Dogs during the 2017–18 season.

During a productive rookie season with the Sea Dogs, Safin agreed to a three-year, entry-level contract with the Oilers on March 6, 2018. Safin played out the regular season with the Sea Dogs, leading the club in scoring with 26 goals and 32 assists for 58 points to be named the club's rookie of the year. With the Dogs finishing out of playoff contention, Safin embarked on his North American professional career to was assigned to the Oilers AHL affiliate, the Bakersfield Condors, on March 20, 2018.

After his entry-level contract with the Oilers, Safin as an impending restricted free agent, opted to return to the Czech Republic and re-join his original club, HC Sparta Praha, by agreeing to a two-year contract on 26 May 2022.

Approaching the 2023–24 season, Safin left Sparta and moved to the KHL on an initial tryout basis with HC Lada Togliatti. On 16 August 2023, Safin successfully secured a one-year contract with Lada. In the midst of the 2024–25 season, Safin transferred to eventual Gagarin Cup finalists, Traktor Chelyabinsk, registering 2 goals through 17 playoff appearances.

== Career statistics ==
=== Regular season and playoffs ===
			Regular season					Playoffs
Season	Team	League	GP	G	A	Pts	PIM	GP	G	A	Pts	PIM
2015–16	HC Sparta Praha	Czech.20	2	0	0	0	2	—	—	—	—	—
2015–16	HC Sparta Praha	ELH	1	0	0	0	0	—	—	—	—	—
2016–17	HC Sparta Praha	Czech.20	24	6	12	18	66	6	4	5	9	2
2016–17	HC Sparta Praha	ELH	8	1	1	2	2	—	—	—	—	—
2016–17	HC Litoměřice	Czech.1	3	0	0	0	0	—	—	—	—	—
2017–18	Saint John Sea Dogs	QMJHL	61	26	32	58	31	—	—	—	—	—
2017–18	Bakersfield Condors	AHL	9	1	0	1	2	—	—	—	—	—
2018–19	Halifax Mooseheads	QMJHL	15	3	8	11	14	23	0	2	2	10
2019–20	Wichita Thunder	ECHL	54	16	19	35	27	—	—	—	—	—
2020–21	Bakersfield Condors	AHL	22	4	2	6	2	6	1	1	2	0
2021–22	Bakersfield Condors	AHL	27	2	3	5	10	—	—	—	—	—
2021–22	Wichita Thunder	ECHL	8	0	1	1	7	—	—	—	—	—
2022–23	HC Sparta Praha	ELH	41	8	5	13	18	2	1	0	1	4
2022–23	HC Baník Sokolov	Czech.1	5	0	8	8	4	—	—	—	—	—
2023–24	Lada Togliatti	KHL	67	13	23	36	32	5	0	0	0	0
2024–25	Lada Togliatti	KHL	25	5	10	15	10	—	—	—	—	—
2024–25	Traktor Chelyabinsk	KHL	15	2	1	3	4	17	2	0	2	4
2025–26	Admiral Vladivostok	KHL	4	0	0	0	0	—	—	—	—	—
2025–26	Shanghai Dragons	KHL	2	0	0	0	0	—	—	—	—	—
2025–26	HK Dukla Trenčín	Slovak	11	1	2	3	2	—	—	—	—	—
ELH totals			50	9	6	15	20	2	1	0	1	4
KHL totals			113	20	34	54	46	22	2	0	2	4

=== International ===
Year	Team	Event	Result	GP	G	A	Pts	PIM
2016	Czech Republic	U17	7th	5	1	0	1	0
2016	Czech Republic	IH18	1st place, gold medalist(s)	5	3	1	4	2
2017	Czech Republic	U18	7th	5	1	3	4	2
2018	Czech Republic	WJC	4th	7	1	2	3	6
Junior totals				22	6	6	12	10
