= Jozef Baláž =

Slovak ice hockey forward

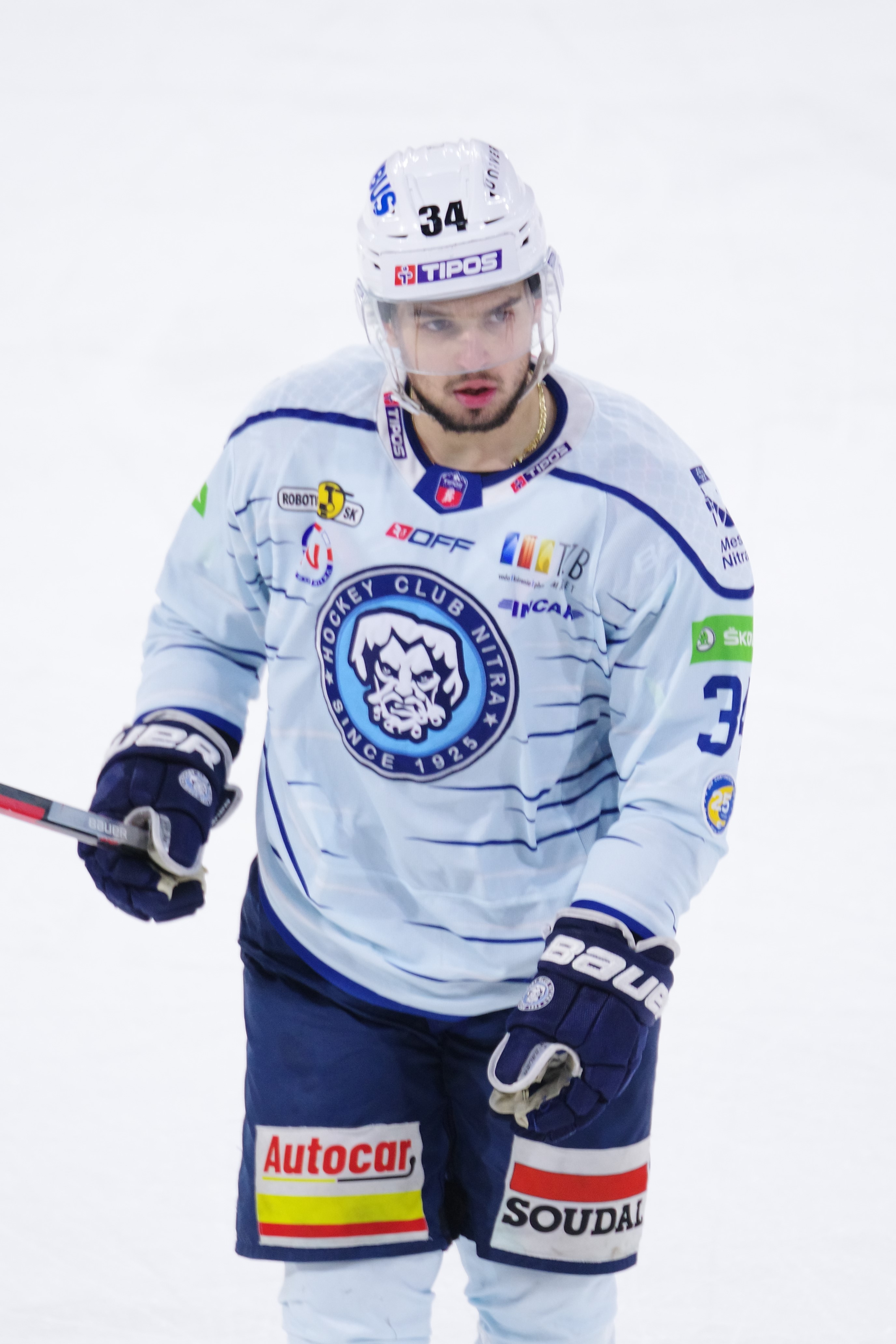
- Jozef Baláž during 2023 IIHF Continental Cup final round
- Born: 18 June 1999 (age 26) Liptovský Mikuláš, Slovakia
- Height: 5 ft 8 in (173 cm)
- Weight: 163 lb (74 kg; 11 st 9 lb)
- Position: Forward
- Shoots: Left
- Slovak team Former teams: HK Dukla Trenčín; HC Vítkovice; AZ Havířov; HC RT Torax Poruba; Draci Šumperk; HK Nitra; HC Energie Karlovy Vary
- Playing career: 2017–present

Jozef Baláž (born 18 June 1999) is a Slovak professional ice hockey forward. He is currently playing for HK Dukla Trenčín of the Slovak Extraliga.

Baláž made his senior debut for Vítkovice during the 2017–18 Czech Extraliga season and to date he has played 43 regular season games for the team, scoring two goals and two assists. He also had loan spells in the Change Liga for HC RT Torax Poruba and AZ Havířov. On August 25, 2020, Baláž joined Draci Šumperk on loan.

== International play ==
Baláž played for Slovakia in the 2017 IIHF World U18 Championships and the 2019 World Junior Ice Hockey Championships.

== Career statistics ==
=== Regular season and playoffs ===
| | | | Regular season | | | | | Playoffs |
| Season | Team | League | GP | G | A | Pts | PIM | GP | G | A | Pts | PIM |

=== International ===
| Year | Team | Event | Result | GP | G | A | Pts | PIM |
|---|---|---|---|---|---|---|---|---|
| 2017 | Slovakia | WJC18 | 6th | 3 | 0 | 2 | 2 | 0 |
| 2019 | Slovakia | WJC | 8th | 5 | 0 | 2 | 2 | 0 |
| Junior totals | | | | 8 | 0 | 4 | 4 | 0 |
