= MacKenzie Entwistle =

Canadian ice hockey player (born 1999)

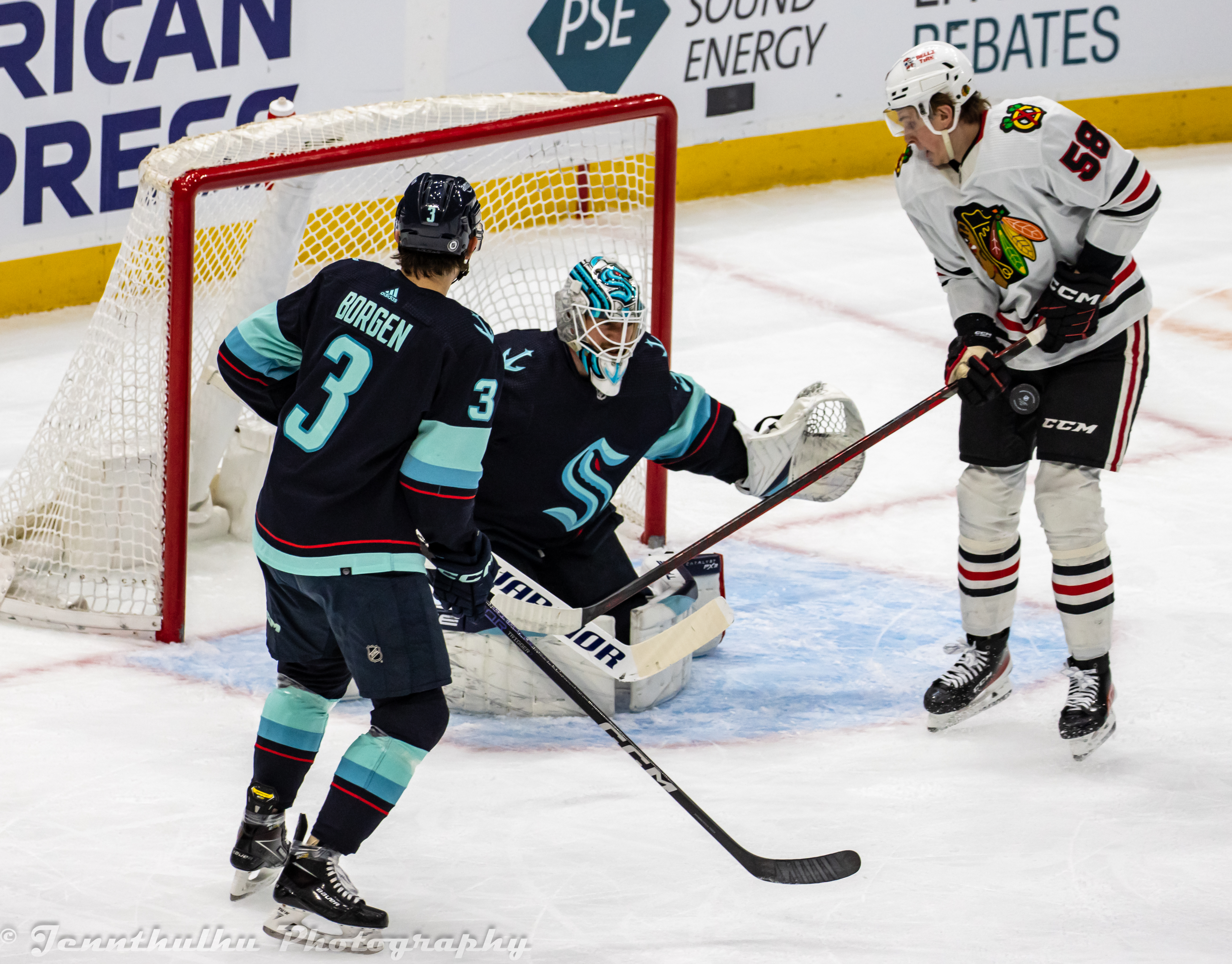
- Entwistle (right) in a game against the Seattle Kraken in 2023.
- Born: July 14, 1999 (age 27) Georgetown, Ontario, Canada
- Height: 6 ft 3 in (191 cm)
- Weight: 203 lb (92 kg; 14 st 7 lb)
- Position: Right wing
- Shoots: Right
- NHL team (P) Cur. team Former teams: Florida Panthers; Charlotte Checkers (AHL); Chicago Blackhawks
- NHL draft: 69th overall, 2017; Arizona Coyotes
- Playing career: 2019–present

MacKenzie Entwistle (born July 14, 1999) is a Canadian professional ice hockey player for the Charlotte Checkers in the American Hockey League (AHL) while under contract to the Florida Panthers of the National Hockey League (NHL). He was selected by the Arizona Coyotes in the third round, 69th overall, of the 2017 NHL entry draft.

== Early life ==
Entwistle was born on July 14, 1999, in Georgetown, Ontario, to Margeret and Dave Entwistle. Both parents were active in sports during their youth, his mother played volleyball, and his father played rugby at the provincial level for Ontario. With his father's English heritage, Entwistle also participated in soccer, along with lacrosse and ice hockey, during his upbringing.

== Playing career ==
Entwistle spent his major junior career in the Ontario Hockey League, suiting up for both the Guelph Storm and the Hamilton Bulldogs.

Selected by the Arizona Coyotes in the 2017 NHL Draft, Entwistle was traded to the Chicago Blackhawks on July 12, 2018, as part of a multi-player deal that included Marcus Kruger, Jordan Maletta, Andrew Campbell, and a 2019 fifth-round pick going to Chicago in exchange for Marian Hossa, Vinnie Hinostroza, Jordan Oesterle, and a third-round pick. A few months later, on October 17, 2018, the Blackhawks signed him to a three-year entry-level contract.

After spending five seasons with the Blackhawks organization, Entwistle departed as a free agent and signed a one-year, two-way deal with the defending Stanley Cup champions, the Florida Panthers, on July 2, 2024.

On July 3, 2025, Entwistle signed a two-year, two-way contract extension with the Panthers.

== Career statistics ==
=== Regular season and playoffs ===
			Regular season					Playoffs
Season	Team	League	GP	G	A	Pts	PIM	GP	G	A	Pts	PIM
2013–14	Toronto Marlboros U16	GTHL	—	—	—	—	—	1	0	0	0	0
2014–15	Toronto Marlboros U16	GTHL	66	22	27	49	24	—	—	—	—	—
2015–16	Hamilton Bulldogs	OHL	60	6	8	14	27	—	—	—	—	—
2016–17	Hamilton Bulldogs	OHL	54	12	13	25	25	7	1	1	2	0
2017–18	Hamilton Bulldogs	OHL	49	13	25	38	35	21	10	7	17	14
2018–19	Hamilton Bulldogs	OHL	29	15	12	27	25	—	—	—	—	—
2018–19	Guelph Storm	OHL	28	15	15	30	23	24	7	14	21	14
2019–20	Rockford IceHogs	AHL	56	11	15	26	38	—	—	—	—	—
2020–21	Chicago Blackhawks	NHL	5	1	1	2	2	—	—	—	—	—
2020–21	Rockford IceHogs	AHL	22	4	8	12	8	—	—	—	—	—
2021–22	Chicago Blackhawks	NHL	55	5	7	12	23	—	—	—	—	—
2021–22	Rockford IceHogs	AHL	2	0	1	1	6	—	—	—	—	—
2022–23	Chicago Blackhawks	NHL	66	4	6	10	14	—	—	—	—	—
2023–24	Chicago Blackhawks	NHL	67	5	6	11	47	—	—	—	—	—
2024–25	Charlotte Checkers	AHL	7	1	1	2	10	8	2	1	3	20
2025–26	Charlotte Checkers	AHL	49	5	6	11	41	2	0	0	0	10
NHL totals			193	15	20	35	86	—	—	—	—	—

=== International ===
Year	Team	Event	GP	G	A	Pts	PIM
2015	Canada Red	U17	6	1	0	1	6
2016	Canada	IH18	4	0	1	1	4
2017	Canada	U18	5	4	3	7	6
2019	Canada	WJC	5	3	0	3	0
Junior totals			20	8	4	12	16
