= Ivan Chekhovich =

Russian ice hockey player (born 1999)

- Born: 4 January 1999 (age 27) Yekaterinburg, Russia
- Height: 5 ft 11 in (180 cm)
- Weight: 187 lb (85 kg; 13 st 5 lb)
- Position: Left winger
- Shoots: Left
- KHL team Former teams: Amur Khabarovsk; Torpedo Nizhny Novgorod; San Jose Sharks; Lokomotiv Yaroslavl; HC Vityaz; Shanghai Dragons; Sibir Novosibirsk
- NHL draft: 212th overall, 2017; San Jose Sharks
- Playing career: 2018–present

Ivan Chekhovich (born 4 January 1999) is a Russian professional ice hockey winger who is currently playing under contract with Amur Khabarovsk of the Kontinental Hockey League (KHL). He was drafted by the San Jose Sharks in the seventh round of the 2017 NHL entry draft with the 212th pick overall.

== Early life ==
Chekhovich was born in Yekaterinburg. He played major junior hockey in North America with Baie-Comeau Drakkar in the Quebec Major Junior Hockey League.

== Playing career ==
On 21 April 2018, Chekhovich was signed by the San Jose Sharks in the last round of the 2017 NHL entry draft to a three-year, entry-level contract.

With the 2020–21 North American season set to be delayed by the COVID-19 pandemic, Chekhovich was loaned by the Sharks to remain in his native Russia, on a season-long agreement with Torpedo Nizhny Novgorod of the Kontinental Hockey League (KHL). Chekhovich made his KHL debut during the 2020–21 KHL season and was among the leading rookie scorers in the league, placing fourth in team scoring with 17 goals and 34 points through 43 regular season games. Chekhovich was re-assigned by the Sharks to continue his season with AHL affiliate, the San Jose Barracuda, on 12 March 2021. He made his NHL debut on 30 April 2021, in a 0–3 loss to the Colorado Avalanche and finished the season with four appearances with the Sharks, registering one assist.

On 31 August 2021, with a contract offer to return to Torpedo, Chekhovich opted to mutually terminate the remaining year of his entry-level contract with the Sharks and was placed on unconditional waivers on 31 August 2021. Unclaimed and as a free agent, Chekhovich returned to Torpedo on a one-year contract on the opening day of the 2021–22 season on 1 September 2021.

On 23 May 2022, Chekhovich left Torpedo as he was traded to fellow KHL club Lokomotiv Yaroslavl, in exchange for prospects and financial compensation. He was immediately signed to a three-year contract extension to remain with Lokomotiv until 2025.

With one year remaining on his contract, Chekhovich was traded by Lokomotiv at the commencement of the 2024–25 season, to HC Vityaz, on 6 September 2024. He played out the season with Vityaz, registering 36 points through 47 regular season games.

With Vityaz withdrawing from the KHL, Chekhovich as a free agent was signed to a two-year contract to continue in the KHL with newly rebranded club, Shanghai Dragons, on 19 August 2025.

== Career statistics ==
=== Regular season and playoffs ===
			Regular season					Playoffs
Season	Team	League	GP	G	A	Pts	PIM	GP	G	A	Pts	PIM
2015–16	HK MVD Balashikha	MHL	19	3	4	7	4	—	—	—	—	—
2016–17	Baie-Comeau Drakkar	QMJHL	60	26	33	59	14	4	1	2	3	2
2017–18	Baie-Comeau Drakkar	QMJHL	65	29	31	60	28	5	3	1	4	2
2017–18	San Jose Barracuda	AHL	6	3	6	9	6	4	0	2	2	0
2018–19	Baie-Comeau Drakkar	QMJHL	66	43	62	105	38	7	3	1	4	2
2018–19	San Jose Barracuda	AHL	5	1	3	4	4	4	2	1	3	6
2019–20	San Jose Barracuda	AHL	42	4	8	12	6	—	—	—	—	—
2020–21	Torpedo Nizhny Novgorod	KHL	43	17	17	34	16	4	2	0	2	2
2020–21	San Jose Barracuda	AHL	17	2	5	7	8	4	0	0	0	0
2020–21	San Jose Sharks	NHL	4	0	1	1	0	—	—	—	—	—
2021–22	Torpedo Nizhny Novgorod	KHL	46	14	8	22	20	—	—	—	—	—
2022–23	Lokomotiv Yaroslavl	KHL	57	13	10	23	18	6	3	0	3	2
2023–24	Lokomotiv Yaroslavl	KHL	59	4	7	11	18	12	2	2	4	4
2024–25	HC Vityaz	KHL	47	12	24	36	14	—	—	—	—	—
2025–26	Shanghai Dragons	KHL	5	0	2	2	2	—	—	—	—	—
2025–26	Sibir Novosibirsk	KHL	21	7	5	12	8	—	—	—	—	—
2025–26	Amur Khabarovsk	KHL	7	0	0	0	0	—	—	—	—	—
KHL totals			285	67	73	140	96	22	7	2	9	8
NHL totals			4	0	1	1	0	—	—	—	—	—

Medal record

Representing Russia

Ice hockey

World U18 Championships
Bronze medal – third place	2017 Slovakia	

=== International ===
Year	Team	Event	Result	GP	G	A	Pts	PIM
2015	Russia	U17	2nd place, silver medalist(s)	6	4	3	7	2
2016	Russia	U18	6th	5	0	1	1	2
2016	Russia	IH18	3rd place, bronze medalist(s)	5	2	2	4	2
2017	Russia	U18	3rd place, bronze medalist(s)	7	4	5	9	4
Junior totals				23	10	11	21	10
