= David Kvasnička =

Czech professional ice hockey defenseman (born 1999)

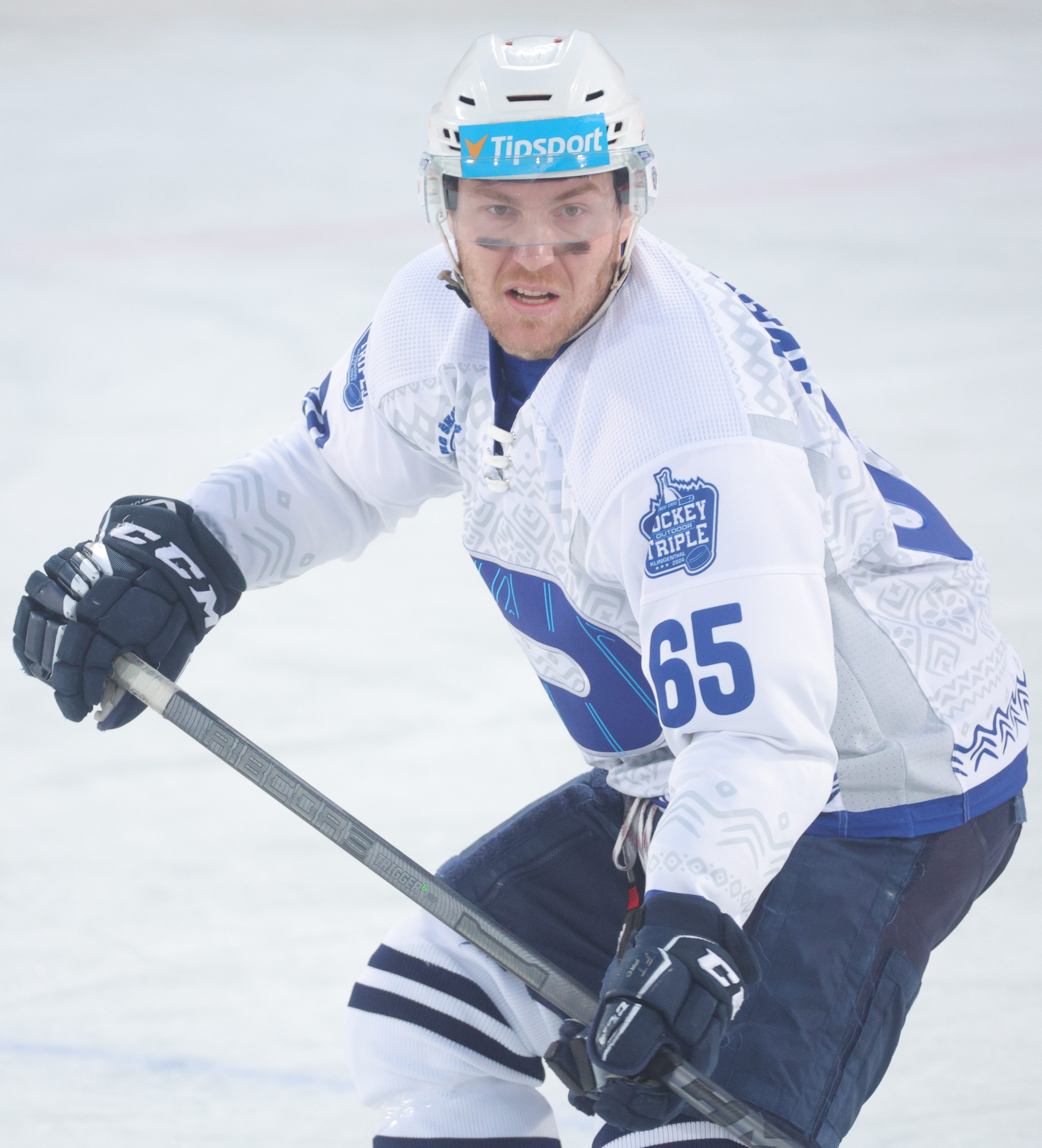
- Kvasnička in 2024
- Born: 14 April 1999 (age 27) Rokycany, Czech Republic
- Height: 5 ft 10 in (178 cm)
- Weight: 185 lb (84 kg; 13 st 3 lb)
- Position: Defence
- Shoots: Left
- ELH team Former teams: HC Škoda Plzeň; HC Plzeň
- Playing career: 2015–present

David Kvasnička (born 14 April 1999) is a Czech professional ice hockey defenceman. He is currently playing for HC Škoda Plzeň of the Czech Extraliga (ELH).

== Playing career ==
Kvasnička made his Czech Extraliga debut playing with HC Plzeň during the 2015–16 Czech Extraliga season. He was later loaned to HC Stadion Litoměřice in the Czech 1. Liga.

== International play ==
Medal record

Representing Czech Republic

Ice hockey

Ivan Hlinka Memorial Tournament
Gold medal – first place	2016 Czech Republic/Slovakia	

Kvasnička first represented the Czech Republic at the 2016 IIHF World U18 Championships. He had two assists in four games as a member of his country's first gold-medal at the 2016 Ivan Hlinka Memorial Tournament.

Kvasnička appeared in a solitary game on the blueline at the 2017 World Junior Championships. He later returned for the 2019 World Junior Championships in Vancouver, British Columbia. Kvasnička contributed with 3 points in 5 games, helping the Czech's advance to the knockout rounds, before a 3-1 elimination defeat to the United States on 2 January 2019. He was selected among the top 3 players for the Czech team in a 7th-place finish.

== Career statistics ==
=== Regular season and playoffs ===
			Regular season					Playoffs
Season	Team	League	GP	G	A	Pts	PIM	GP	G	A	Pts	PIM
2015–16	HC Plzeň	Czech.20	28	1	13	14	6	11	1	11	12	2
2015–16	HC Plzeň	ELH	4	0	0	0	0	—	—	—	—	—
2016–17	HC Plzeň	Czech.20	17	4	17	21	8	4	1	4	5	0
2016–17	HC Plzeň	ELH	23	0	3	3	2	5	0	1	1	0
2017–18	HC Plzeň	Czech.20	9	1	5	6	0	7	0	4	4	4
2017–18	HC Plzeň	ELH	24	0	2	2	10	—	—	—	—	—
2017–18	HC Stadion Litoměřice	Czech.1	12	0	4	4	2	—	—	—	—	—
2017–18	SHC Klatovy	Czech.2	3	1	2	3	0	—	—	—	—	—
2018–19	HC Plzeň	ELH	17	0	2	2	12	—	—	—	—	—
2018–19	HC Stadion Litoměřice	Czech.1	16	1	4	5	4	—	—	—	—	—
ELH totals			68	0	7	7	24	5	0	1	1	0

=== International ===
Year	Team	Event	Result	GP	G	A	Pts	PIM
2016	Czech Republic	WJC18	7th	5	0	2	2	4
2016	Czech Republic	IH18	1st place, gold medalist(s)	4	0	2	2	2
2017	Czech Republic	WJC18	7th	5	1	4	5	6
2017	Czech Republic	WJC	6th	1	0	0	0	0
2019	Czech Republic	WJC	7th	5	1	2	3	0
Junior totals				20	2	10	12	12
