= Jesse Ylönen =

Finnish ice hockey player (born 1999)

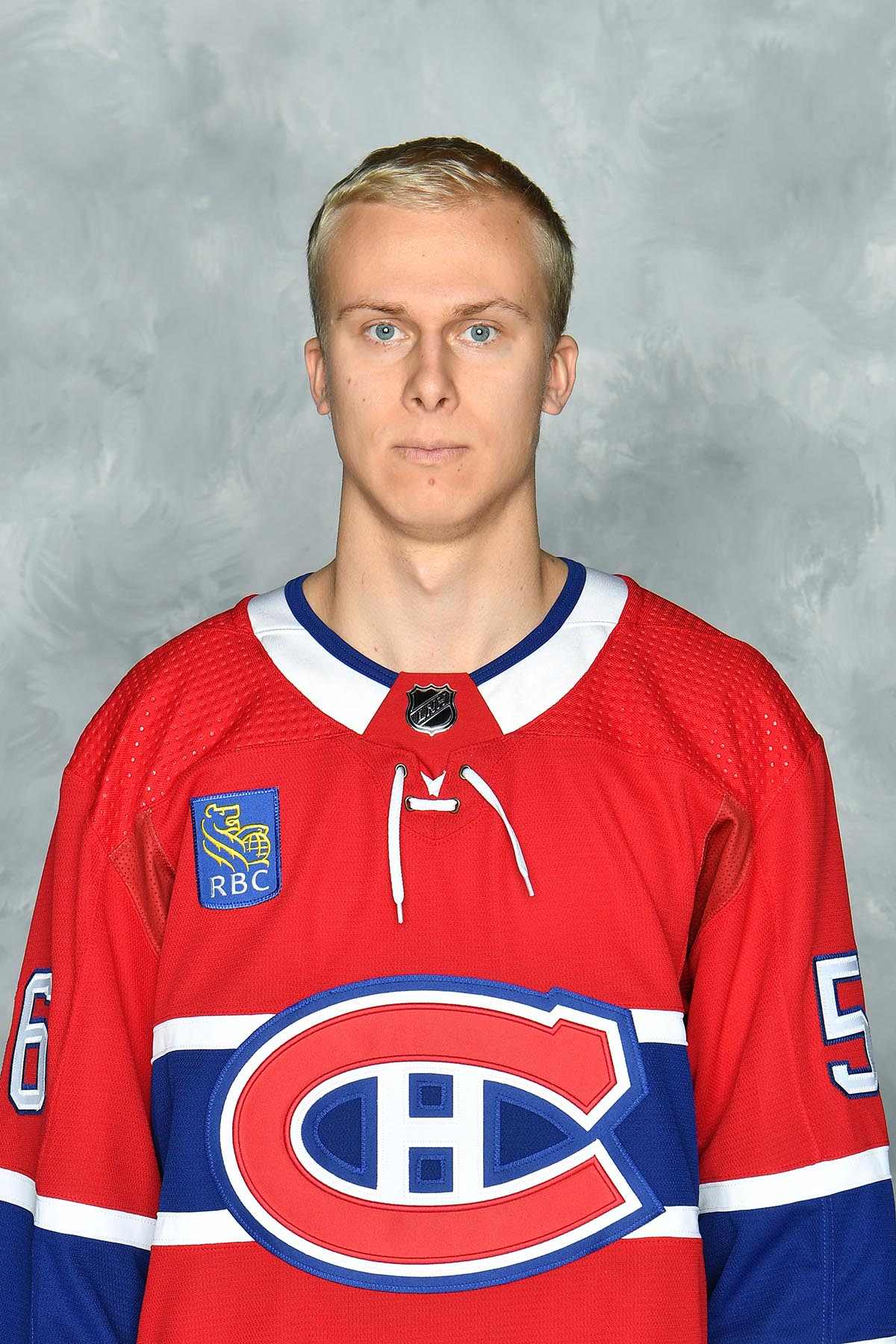
- Ylönen with the Montreal Canadiens in 2022
- Born: 3 October 1999 (age 26) Scottsdale, Arizona, U.S.
- Height: 6 ft 0 in (183 cm)
- Weight: 167 lb (76 kg; 11 st 13 lb)
- Position: Right wing
- Shoots: Right
- SHL team Former teams: Djurgårdens IF; Lahti Pelicans; Montreal Canadiens
- NHL draft: 35th overall, 2018; Montreal Canadiens
- Playing career: 2016–present

Jesse Ylönen (born 3 October 1999) is a Finnish professional ice hockey player who is a winger for Djurgårdens IF of the Swedish Hockey League (SHL). He was selected in the second round, 35th overall, by the Montreal Canadiens in the 2018 NHL entry draft. Ylönen holds dual citizenship of Finland and the United States.

== Playing career ==
Ylönen played as a youth with his hometown club, the Espoo Blues, through to the under-18 level. After a stint within the Jokerit junior program, Ylönen returned to the Blues making his professional debut with Espoo United of the Mestis during the 2016–17 season. In his first full season with Espoo United in 2017–18, Ylönen posted an impressive 27 points in 48 games as a rookie.

Opting to remain in Finland to continue his development, Ylönen joined the top tier Liiga club, the Lahti Pelicans, on a two-year contract in April 2018. Ylönen was then selected by the Montreal Canadiens of the National Hockey League (NHL) in the second round, 35th overall, of the 2018 NHL entry draft.

In his final year under contract with the Pelicans in the 2019–20 season, Ylönen was unable to surpass his rookie season production, registering 12 goals and 22 points through 53 games. On 1 March 2020, with the Pelicans out of playoff contention, Ylönen opted to sign his first professional contract abroad, agreeing to play the remainder of the season with the Canadiens' American Hockey League (AHL) affiliate, the Laval Rocket. However, due to the COVID-19 pandemic, his debut with the team would be postponed. On 26 March, Ylönen was signed to a three-year entry-level contract with the Canadiens. With the pandemic delaying the beginning of the 2020–21 NHL season, Ylönen was loaned back to the Pelicans to start the 2020–21 campaign, subsequently returning to Montreal with the opening of their respective training camp. Ylönen would eventually make his North American debut during the 2020–21 AHL season. After scoring nine goals and 17 points with the Rocket, Ylönen would be recalled by Montreal on 12 May 2021. He made his NHL debut in a 4–3 overtime loss to the Edmonton Oilers that same day, being the final game of the season.

During the 2021–22 season, Ylönen was recalled by Montreal on 8 December 2021 after Christian Dvorak suffered an injury. He made his season debut with the Canadiens in a 2–0 loss to the Chicago Blackhawks the following day. Ylönen initially played on the fourth line alongside Cédric Paquette and Michael Pezzetta, before being promoted to the first line with Nick Suzuki and Mike Hoffman in his second game of the season versus the St. Louis Blues. He was then placed on a line with Jonathan Drouin and Laurent Dauphin. Ylönen scored his first NHL goal on a pass from linemate Drouin on 15 December 2021 in a 5–2 loss to the Pittsburgh Penguins. He was sent back to Laval on 11 April 2022.

During the 2022–23 season, Ylönen was recalled by the Canadiens on 11 January 2023 after posting eight goals and 27 points in 34 games with Laval. He scored his first goal of the season and likewise had his first multi-point game in the NHL during a 5–2 win over the Philadelphia Flyers on 24 February 2023. Ylönen was then assigned to Laval on 9 April having played in 37 games with Montreal, scoring six goals and 16 points.

On 31 July 2023, Ylönen signed a one-year two-way contract extension with the Canadiens. He played in 59 games with Montreal in the 2023–24 season, scoring four goals and eight points.

Prior to the beginning of the NHL free agency period, Ylönen was not tendered a qualifying offer by the Canadiens before the deadline on 30 June 2024, making him an unrestricted free agent. He signed a one-year contract with the Tampa Bay Lightning the following day. He was assigned to the Lightning's AHL affiliate, the Syracuse Crunch, to start the 2024–25 season. He appeared in 47 games with Syracuse, scoring eight goals and 25 points before being recalled by Tampa Bay on 21 February 2025. However, he never appeared for the club and was returned to Syracuse the following day.

On 26 February, Ylönen was traded to the Nashville Predators with Anthony Angello moving to Tampa Bay. Ylönen was assigned to the Predators' AHL affiliate, Milwaukee Admirals. With Milwaukee he appeared in 19 games, recording four goals and ten points. The Admirals qualified for the 2025 Calder Cup playoffs, and Ylönen tallied three goals and four points in nine playoff games.

On 28 May, he signed a two-year deal with Djurgårdens IF of the Swedish Hockey League (SHL).

== Personal life ==
A second-generation NHLer, Ylönen was born on 3 October 1999 in Scottsdale, Arizona. His father Juha, a former professional ice hockey centre, won a bronze medal with the Finnish national team at the 1998 Winter Olympics and played a total of six NHL seasons with the Phoenix Coyotes, Tampa Bay Lightning, and Ottawa Senators, being a member of the Coyotes at the time of Jesse's birth.

== Career statistics ==
=== Regular season and playoffs ===
			Regular season					Playoffs
Season	Team	League	GP	G	A	Pts	PIM	GP	G	A	Pts	PIM
2015–16	Jokerit	Jr. A	1	0	0	0	0	—	—	—	—	—
2016–17	Espoo Blues	Jr. A	37	15	16	31	14	4	0	0	0	4
2016–17	Espoo United	Mestis	3	0	0	0	2	3	0	0	0	0
2017–18	Espoo United	Mestis	48	14	13	27	20	—	—	—	—	—
2017–18	Espoo Blues	Jr. A	—	—	—	—	—	4	3	0	3	0
2018–19	Lahti Pelicans	Liiga	53	13	14	27	8	3	0	1	1	0
2019–20	Lahti Pelicans	Liiga	53	12	10	22	14	—	—	—	—	—
2020–21	Lahti Pelicans	Liiga	21	5	2	7	8	—	—	—	—	—
2020–21	Laval Rocket	AHL	29	9	8	17	6	—	—	—	—	—
2020–21	Montreal Canadiens	NHL	1	0	0	0	0	—	—	—	—	—
2021–22	Laval Rocket	AHL	52	14	22	36	12	14	3	3	6	2
2021–22	Montreal Canadiens	NHL	14	2	3	5	2	—	—	—	—	—
2022–23	Laval Rocket	AHL	39	11	21	32	16	2	0	0	0	0
2022–23	Montreal Canadiens	NHL	37	6	10	16	0	—	—	—	—	—
2023–24	Montreal Canadiens	NHL	59	4	4	8	12	—	—	—	—	—
2024–25	Syracuse Crunch	AHL	47	8	17	25	18	—	—	—	—	—
2024–25	Milwaukee Admirals	AHL	19	4	6	10	4	9	3	1	4	0
Liiga totals			127	30	26	56	30	3	0	1	1	0
NHL totals			111	12	17	29	14	—	—	—	—	—

Medal record

Representing Finland

Men's ice hockey

World Junior Championships
Gold medal – first place	2019 Canada	

World U18 Championships
Silver medal – second place	2017 Slovakia	

=== International ===
Year	Team	Event	Result	GP	G	A	Pts	PIM
2017	Finland	U18	2nd place, silver medalist(s)	7	4	5	9	0
2019	Finland	WJC	1st place, gold medalist(s)	7	3	3	6	0
Junior totals				14	7	8	15	0
