= Poprad Ice Stadium =

Arena in Poprad, Slovakia

Zimný štadión mesta Poprad
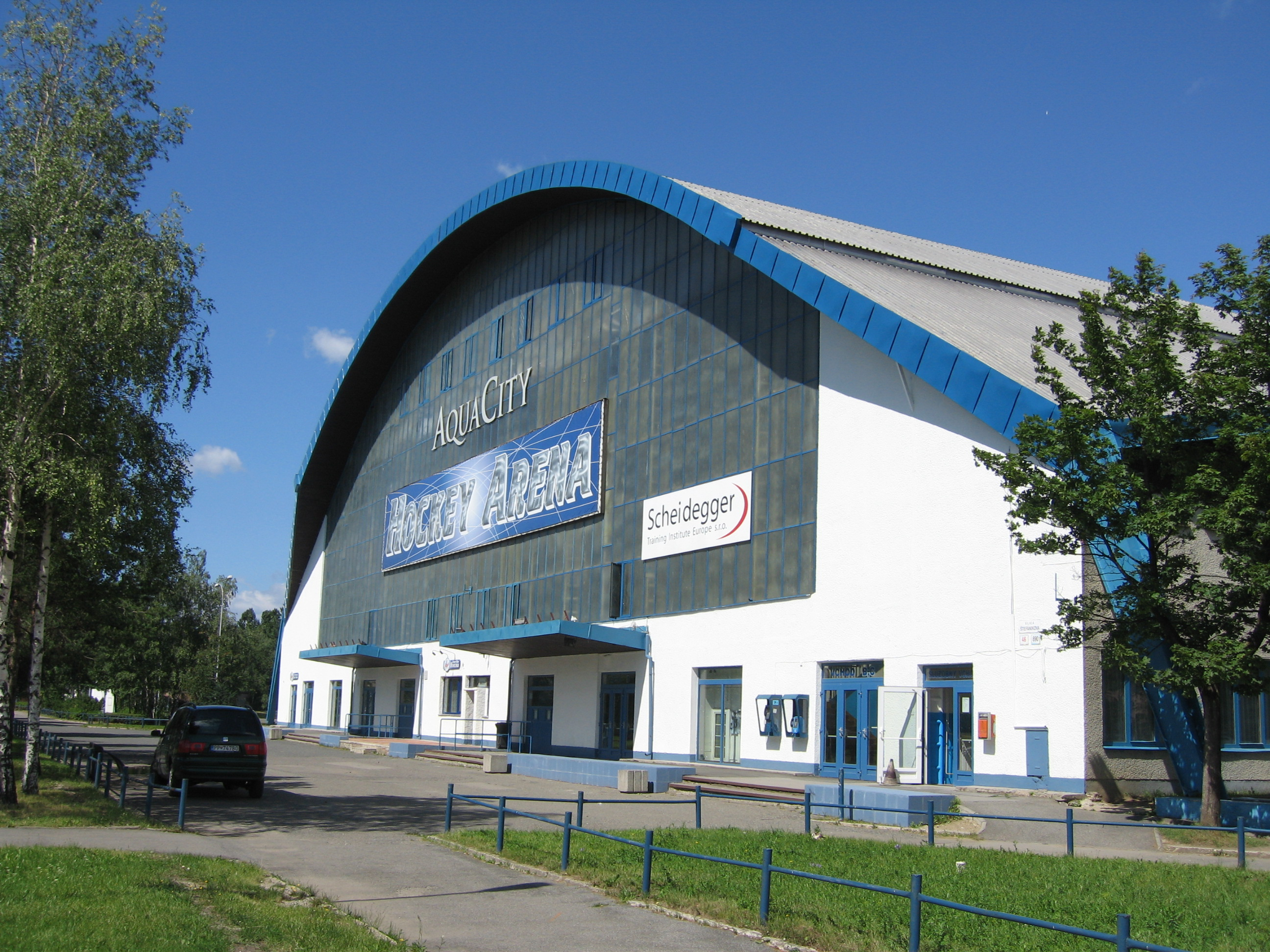
- Interactive map of Zimný štadión mesta Poprad
- Location: Poprad, Slovakia
- Coordinates: 49°03′38″N 20°18′40″E
- Capacity: 4,233 (3,933 seating, 300 standing)

Construction
- Opened: 1973
- Renovated: 2006–2008

Tenants
- HK Poprad 1973–present Lev Poprad 2011–2012; 2017 IIHF World U18 Championships

Poprad Ice Stadium (Slovak: Zimný štadión mesta Poprad) is an arena in Poprad, Slovakia. It is primarily used for ice hockey and is the home ice of HK Poprad (playing in the Slovak Extraliga). It has a capacity of 4,500 people and was built in 1973 and renovated in 2011. During the 2011–12 KHL season, it was also the home arena of Lev Poprad, which was playing in the Kontinental Hockey League.

== Notable events ==
An overview of some sport events:

1987

- 1987 Winter Universiade

1994

- 1994 IIHF World Championship Group C1

1999

- 1999 Winter Universiade

2017

- 2017 IIHF World Under-18 Championship
