= Jacob Peterson (ice hockey) =

Swedish professional ice hockey player

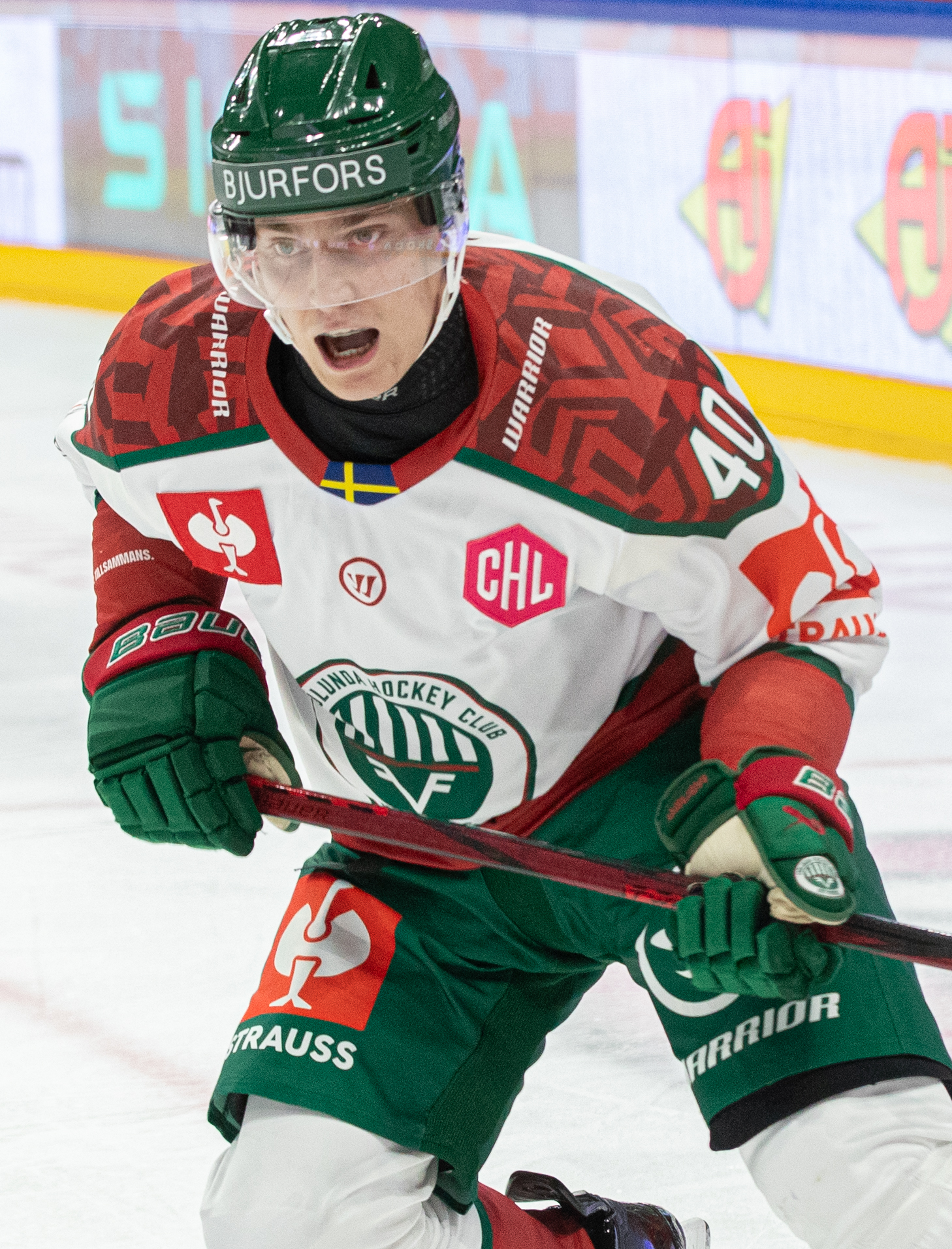
- Peterson in 2025
- Born: 19 July 1999 (age 27) Lidköping, Sweden
- Height: 185 cm (6 ft 1 in)
- Weight: 82 kg (181 lb; 12 st 13 lb)
- Position: Centre/Winger
- Shoots: Left
- SHL team Former teams: Frölunda HC; Färjestad BK; Dallas Stars; San Jose Sharks; Rögle BK
- National team: Sweden
- NHL draft: 132nd overall, 2017; Dallas Stars
- Playing career: 2017–present

Jacob Peterson (born 19 July 1999) is a Swedish ice hockey forward currently playing for Frölunda HC in the Swedish Hockey League (SHL). He was selected by the Dallas Stars in the fifth round, 132nd overall, of the 2017 NHL entry draft.

== Playing career ==
Peterson made his first appearance in the SHL during the 2017–18 season, suiting up for Frölunda HC. As a young prospect making the transition from junior hockey to the professional level, he played in nine games with the senior squad.

During his fourth season with Frölunda HC in 2019–20, Peterson completed his first full campaign in the SHL, setting personal highs with five goals and 16 points across 43 games before the season was cut short by the COVID-19 pandemic. On April 1, 2020, he chose to part ways with Frölunda HC and signed a two-year deal with another SHL team, Färjestad BK.

On April 28, 2021, Peterson agreed to a two-year entry-level deal with the Dallas Stars, the team that had selected him in the draft.

At the NHL trade deadline in the 2022–23 season, on March 3, 2023, the Stars traded Peterson to the San Jose Sharks in exchange for Scott Reedy. A few months later, in June 2023, Peterson agreed to a one-year contract extension with the Sharks.

After spending two seasons with the Sharks organization, Peterson became a pending restricted free agent but was not extended a qualifying offer to remain with the team. As a result, he entered free agency and returned to Sweden, signing a three-year contract (with an option) with Rögle BK of the SHL on July 14, 2024.

== Career statistics ==
=== Regular season and playoffs ===
			Regular season					Playoffs
Season	Team	League	GP	G	A	Pts	PIM	GP	G	A	Pts	PIM
2014–15	HC Lidköping	Div.3	13	9	12	21	6	—	—	—	—	—
2016–17	Frölunda HC	J20	44	15	12	27	8	5	0	0	0	0
2017–18	Frölunda HC	J20	33	13	21	34	26	2	1	2	3	0
2017–18	Frölunda HC	SHL	9	0	0	0	0	—	—	—	—	—
2017–18	IF Björklöven	Allsv	10	3	2	5	2	5	1	1	2	4
2018–19	IF Björklöven	Allsv	49	14	13	27	16	—	—	—	—	—
2018–19	Frölunda HC	SHL	2	0	2	2	2	16	4	4	8	10
2019–20	Frölunda HC	SHL	43	5	11	16	12	—	—	—	—	—
2020–21	Färjestad BK	SHL	46	14	19	33	14	6	1	1	2	0
2021–22	Dallas Stars	NHL	65	12	5	17	12	3	0	0	0	0
2021–22	Texas Stars	AHL	6	2	3	5	6	—	—	—	—	—
2022–23	Dallas Stars	NHL	1	0	0	0	0	—	—	—	—	—
2022–23	Texas Stars	AHL	44	13	13	26	22	—	—	—	—	—
2022–23	San Jose Barracuda	AHL	8	1	5	6	4	—	—	—	—	—
2022–23	San Jose Sharks	NHL	11	2	6	8	4	—	—	—	—	—
2023–24	San Jose Barracuda	AHL	40	9	13	22	10	—	—	—	—	—
2023–24	San Jose Sharks	NHL	6	0	0	0	2	—	—	—	—	—
2024–25	Rögle BK	SHL	32	6	2	8	6	—	—	—	—	—
2024–25	Frölunda HC	SHL	19	3	5	8	6	6	1	1	2	0
SHL totals			151	28	39	67	40	28	6	6	12	10
NHL totals			83	14	11	25	18	3	0	0	0	0

=== International ===
Year	Team	Event	Result	GP	G	A	Pts	PIM
2017	Sweden	U18	4th	7	1	1	2	2
2022	Sweden	WC	6th	5	2	3	5	0
Junior totals				7	1	1	2	2
Senior totals				5	2	3	5	0

== Awards and honours ==
Award	Year
SHL
Le Mat Trophy champion	2019
