= Scott Reedy =

American ice hockey player (born 1999)

- Born: April 4, 1999 (age 27) Prior Lake, Minnesota, U.S.
- Height: 6 ft 2 in (188 cm)
- Weight: 204 lb (93 kg; 14 st 8 lb)
- Position: Center
- Shoots: Right
- AHL team Former teams: Free agent San Jose Sharks
- NHL draft: 102nd overall, 2017; San Jose Sharks
- Playing career: 2021–present

Scott Reedy (born April 4, 1999) is an American professional ice hockey forward who is currently an unrestricted free agent. He most recently played on a professional tryout with the Bridgeport Islanders of the American Hockey League (AHL). He was selected by the San Jose Sharks in the 2017 NHL entry draft, and made his NHL debut in 2021.

== Early life ==
Reedy was born on April 4, 1999, in Prior Lake, Minnesota, to parents Dan and Christina Reedy. Growing up in Minnesota, Reedy started skating when he was 2 1/2 years old in an effort to emulate his elder brother. As a youth, he played peewee hockey in Minnesota District 6 and helped them win the state championship in Alexandria. He also looked up to players on the Minnesota Golden Gophers men's ice hockey team, especially Blake Wheeler and Phil Kessel.

== Playing career ==
=== Amateur ===
After winning the PeeWee tournament, Reedy enrolled at Shattuck St. Mary's in Faribault, Minnesota at the age of 14. During his first year at the school, Reedy helped lead the team to the 2014 Toyota-USA Hockey Tier I Youth National Championships title by scoring seven goals in the tournament. Following the tournament, Reedy was chosen as one of 20 Minnesota players to the USA Hockey National Development Camp in New York and he committed to play collegiate hockey at the University of Minnesota. Reedy returned to St. Mary's in the Fall of 2014 and was chosen to play for the Prep team. In his first year playing for the prep team, Reedy helped them qualify for the USA Hockey Minnesota District 18U Tier I championship.

Following his sophomore year, Reedy impressed at the USA Hockey National Team Development Program (NTDP) tryouts and subsequently committed to play with the team in the United States Hockey League. He had concluded his time at St. Mary's with 180 points in 119 games. Upon joining the team, NTDP's Director of Player Personnel described Reedy as "a versatile, playmaking forward who has a very mature, professional approach to the game." In his rookie season, Reedy scored four points in four games at the U17 Five Nations tournament and nine points in five games at the World U-17 Hockey Challenge. He also competed at the 2016 USA Hockey/CCM All-American Prospects Game after scoring 22 points in 21 USHL games during the 2015–16 season. His play in the USHL earned him attention from hockey scouts and he was ranked 92nd overall leading up to the 2017 NHL entry draft.

=== Collegiate ===
Reedy played for the Golden Gophers at the University of Minnesota from 2017 to 2021. During his rookie season, he recorded seven goals and eight assists for 15 points through 35 games. He made his NCAA debut in the Gophers season opener on October 6, 2017, where he also tallied his first career goal and point in an overtime loss against Minnesota Duluth. Reedy was quickly placed on a line with Casey Mittelstadt and Rem Pitlick and by early-November they combined for seven goals and 10 assists. As the Gophers were swept from the 2018 Big Ten tournament, Reedy's line with Mittelstadt and Pitlick combined for five goals.

Reedy returned to the Golden Gophers for his sophomore season during the 2018–19 season where he recorded seven goals and four assists through 34 games. He began the season strong by tallying two assists in three games before suffering a lower-body injury which caused him to miss four games. Upon returning to the lineup, Reedy recorded his first three goals of the season by tallying his first collegiate hat-trick in a 5–3 win over Ferris State. He was subsequently honored with the Big Ten Third Star of the Week. Reedy picked up his second Big Ten weekly honor of the season in mid-February after he snapped his 13-game point drought with two goals in a 4–3 win over Ohio State. At the time of the honor, he had recorded five goals and two assists in 27 games while the Gophers went 3–0–0 when he scores a goal and 4–0–0 when he picks up a point. Reedy finished his sophomore season with a selection to the Academic All-B1G team for maintaining a cumulative GPA of 3.0 or higher.

Following his sophomore season, Reedy participated in the San Jose Sharks' Prospects Development Camp before returning to the Golden Gophers for his junior year. Due to the COVID-19 pandemic, the 2019–20 season was shortened but Reedy still recorded career highs with 23 points and 15 goals while tying his career high with eight assists. During his junior year, Reedy played on Minnesota's top line with Sammy Walker and Blake McLaughlin. In their series against the Michigan Spartans, the line accounted for 13 of the team's 18 points.

=== Professional ===
Reedy concluded his collegiate career on April 2, 2021, by signing a two-year entry-level contract with the Sharks. Following the signing, he joined their American Hockey League (AHL) team, the San Jose Barracuda, on an Amateur Tryout for the remainder of the 2020–21 season. Upon joining the Barracuda, Reedy tallied three goals and one assist through his first 10 games. He finished the regular season with eight points and he tallied one assist during the 2021 Calder Cup playoffs.

Reedy remained with the Barracuda to begin the 2021–22 AHL season. He recorded a team-high 12 points through their first 12 games before being recalled to the NHL level on November 22, 2021. His first goal came on February 27, 2022, in a 3–1 victory over the Seattle Kraken.

On March 3, 2023, the Sharks traded Reedy to the Dallas Stars in exchange for Jacob Peterson. Reedy closed out the season with the Texas Stars of the AHL, scoring 6 goals and 4 assists for 10 points in 18 games.

On July 3, 2023, Reedy signed a one-year, two-way deal as a restricted free agent to return to the Stars. Injuries limited Reedy to just 12 games in the 2023–24 season, where he scored 5 goals and 2 assists for 7 points. Reedy became a Group 6 unrestricted free agent on July 1, 2024.

Un-signed into the 2024–25 season, Reedy belatedly signed a professional tryout with the Milwaukee Admirals of the AHL, affiliate to the Nashville Predators, on December 12, 2024.

On February 12, 2026, Reedy signed a professional tryout with the Bridgeport Islanders of the AHL.

== Career statistics ==
=== Regular season and playoffs ===
| | | | Regular season | | | | | Playoffs |
| Season | Team | League | GP | G | A | Pts | PIM | GP | G | A | Pts | PIM |
|---|---|---|---|---|---|---|---|---|---|---|---|---|
| 2014–15 | Shattuck-Saint Mary's | USHS | 54 | 23 | 32 | 55 | 24 | — | — | — | — | — |
| 2015–16 | U.S. National Development Team | USHL | 33 | 9 | 19 | 28 | 10 | — | — | — | — | — |
| 2016–17 | U.S. National Development Team | USHL | 21 | 10 | 4 | 14 | 39 | — | — | — | — | — |
| 2017–18 | U. of Minnesota | B1G | 35 | 7 | 8 | 15 | 43 | — | — | — | — | — |
| 2018–19 | U. of Minnesota | B1G | 34 | 7 | 4 | 11 | 10 | — | — | — | — | — |
| 2019–20 | U. of Minnesota | B1G | 35 | 15 | 8 | 23 | 12 | — | — | — | — | — |
| 2020–21 | U. of Minnesota | B1G | 28 | 11 | 17 | 28 | 6 | — | — | — | — | — |
| 2020–21 | San Jose Barracuda | AHL | 17 | 5 | 3 | 8 | 6 | 4 | 0 | 1 | 1 | 6 |
| 2021–22 | San Jose Barracuda | AHL | 38 | 18 | 9 | 27 | 4 | — | — | — | — | — |
| 2021–22 | San Jose Sharks | NHL | 35 | 7 | 2 | 9 | 10 | — | — | — | — | — |
| 2022–23 | San Jose Barracuda | AHL | 38 | 5 | 8 | 13 | 12 | — | — | — | — | — |
| 2022–23 | Texas Stars | AHL | 18 | 6 | 4 | 10 | 9 | 8 | 1 | 1 | 2 | 0 |
| 2023–24 | Texas Stars | AHL | 12 | 5 | 2 | 7 | 0 | — | — | — | — | — |
| 2024–25 | Milwaukee Admirals | AHL | 25 | 4 | 5 | 9 | 8 | — | — | — | — | — |
| 2025–26 | Bridgeport Islanders | AHL | 6 | 0 | 0 | 0 | 0 | — | — | — | — | — |
| NHL totals | | | 35 | 7 | 2 | 9 | 10 | — | — | — | — | — |

=== International ===
| Year | Team | Event | Result | GP | G | A | Pts | PIM |
|---|---|---|---|---|---|---|---|---|
| 2015 | United States | U17 | 6th | 5 | 6 | 3 | 9 | 2 |
| 2017 | United States | U18 | 1st place, gold medalist(s) | 7 | 1 | 1 | 2 | 2 |
| Junior totals | | | | 12 | 7 | 4 | 11 | 4 |

== Awards and honours ==
| Award | Year |
College
| B1G Honorable Mention All-Star Team | 2021 |
