= David Farrance =

American ice hockey player

- Born: June 23, 1999 (age 27) Victor, New York, U.S.
- Height: 5 ft 11 in (180 cm)
- Weight: 189 lb (86 kg; 13 st 7 lb)
- Position: Defense
- Shoots: Left
- ICE team Former teams: HC Pustertal Wölfe; Nashville Predators; Milwaukee Admirals; Chicago Wolves; Colorado Eagles; Toronto Marlies; Newfoundland Growlers; ERC Ingolstadt; KooKoo; Sibir Novosibirsk; Augsburger Panther
- NHL draft: 92nd overall, 2017; Nashville Predators
- Playing career: 2021–present

David Farrance (born June 23, 1999) is an American professional ice hockey defenseman. Farrance was selected by the Nashville Predators in the third-round, 92nd overall, of the 2017 NHL entry draft.

== Early life ==
Farrance was born on June 23, 1999, in Victor, New York, U.S. to parents Pam and David Farrance. He is the middle child with one older sister, Sydney Farrance and one younger sister, Julia Farrance . Farrance grew up playing baseball but was ultimately drawn to ice hockey because of its speed and action. He worked on his skating ability alongside his friend Jake Tortora with power-skating instructor Erika Stone at Paul Louis Arena.

== Playing career ==
=== Amateur ===
Farrance chose to play high school hockey with the Victor Blue Devils high school team in 2014 while practicing with the Syracuse Nationals 16-under AAA team twice a week. During the 2013–14 season, Farrance was the Syracuse Stars under-16's leading scorer with 20 goals and 12 assists for 32 in 28 United States Premier Hockey League (USPHL) games. He also played for Victor in the Section V high school league, gathering 46 points in 21 games. While playing for the Syracuse Stars under-16 team as a sophomore in high school, Farrance made a verbal commitment to join Boston University for his freshman season in 2017–18. By making the commitment, he announced his decision to forgo his Ontario Hockey League (OHL) eligibility.

As a sophomore, Farrance split the 2014–15 season with the Blue Devils in the Monroe County league and the Syracuse Stars under-16. He was named USPHL MVP and Defenseman of the Year after accumulating up 52 points for the Stars and also was a first-team All-State selection with Victor. Due to his offensive success, Farrance accepted an invitation to play for USA Hockey National Team Development Program (USNTDP). Farrance played two seasons with the USNTDP in the United States Hockey League (USHL) before joining Boston University. During the 2016–17 USHL season, Farrance recorded 37 points in 64 games and helped Team USA earn a gold medal at 2017 IIHF World U18 Championships.

Following the conclusion of his USHL career, Farrance was selected 92nd overall by the Nashville Predators of the National Hockey League (NHL) in the 2017 NHL entry draft. Leading up to the draft, Farrance was ranked 46th amongst all North American skaters by the NHL Central Scouting Bureau.

=== Collegiate ===
Farrance played four seasons for the Boston University Terriers at Boston University while enrolled in the Boston University College of Arts and Sciences, majoring in psychology. During his rookie season, Farrance played in 31 games where he recorded three goals and six assists. He made his NCAA tournament debut on March 24, 2018, where he scored the game-winning goal against Cornell University. As a result, he was named to the NCAA Northeast Regional All-Tournament Team. The Terriers were eventually eliminated in the following round against Michigan. As a sophomore, Farrance picked up offensively and tied for fifth on the team in points with 20 on four goals and 16 assists.

During his junior season, Farrance led all NCAA defensemen in scoring, recording 43 points across 35 games. Following the season, he was selected to the Hockey East First All-Star Team and was named one of the finalists for the Hobey Baker Award.

=== Professional ===
On March 28, 2021, having completed his four-year collegiate career, Farrance was signed a two-year, entry-level contract with the Nashville Predators. Upon joining the Predators organization, Farrance was assigned to their taxi squad. He eventually made his NHL debut on April 8, 2021, against the Detroit Red Wings, where he logged 12:46 of ice time with one shot, one hit, one blocked shot and a plus-1 rating. He spent the 2021–22 season with Nashville's American Hockey League (AHL) affiliate, the Milwaukee Admirals, playing in 50 games, scoring one goal and 14 points.

At the conclusion of his entry-level contract and as an impending restricted free agent, Farrance was not tendered a qualifying offer by the Predators and was released to free agency. On July 26, 2022, Farrance continued his tenure in the AHL, agreeing to a one-year contract with the Chicago Wolves, primary affiliate to the Carolina Hurricanes, for the 2022–23 season. Farrance got off to a positive start with the Wolves, registering 1 goal and 5 points through 14 games from the blueline. On December 2, 2022, Farrance was traded by the Wolves to the Colorado Eagles, primary affiliate of the Colorado Avalanche, in exchange for future considerations. Farrance made an immediate impact on the blueline with the Eagles, finding his scoring touch in posting 17 assists and 19 points through 31 regular season games.

Having concluded the season with the Eagles, on August 22, 2023, Farrance was signed as a free agent to a one-year AHL contract with the Toronto Marlies. In the 2023–24 season, Farrance was unable to establish himself amongst the depth of the Marlies blueline, making just 3 appearances with the team before he was re-assigned to ECHL affiliate, the Newfoundland Growlers. On January 25, 2024, Farrance opted for a release from his contract with the Marlies in order to sign his first contract abroad with German club, ERC Ingolstadt of the DEL.

For the 2024–25 season, Farrance signed a one-year contract with KooKoo in the Liiga. He scored 37 (2+35) points in 53 regular season games and no points in 4 playoff games, and after a first-round elimination by Vaasan Sport he left the team.

For the 2025–26 season, Farrance signed a one-year contract with Sibir Novosibirsk of the Kontinental Hockey League with the salary of 35 million rubles a year. On December 1, 2025 Sibir Novosibirsk reported that Farrance's contract was terminated by mutual consent, he has played 10 regular season games and scored 3 (0+3) points in KHL.

On January 22, 2026 Farrance joined Augsburger Panther for the rest of the season.

== Career statistics ==
=== Regular season and playoffs ===
			Regular season					Playoffs
Season	Team	League	GP	G	A	Pts	PIM	GP	G	A	Pts	PIM
2015–16	U.S. National Development Team	USHL	31	4	9	13	14	—	—	—	—	—
2016–17	U.S. National Development Team	USHL	25	1	16	17	22	—	—	—	—	—
2017–18	Boston University	HE	31	3	6	9	12	—	—	—	—	—
2018–19	Boston University	HE	37	4	16	20	19	—	—	—	—	—
2019–20	Boston University	HE	34	14	29	43	20	—	—	—	—	—
2020–21	Boston University	HE	11	5	11	16	4	—	—	—	—	—
2020–21	Nashville Predators	NHL	2	0	0	0	0	—	—	—	—	—
2021–22	Milwaukee Admirals	AHL	50	1	13	14	15	—	—	—	—	—
2022–23	Chicago Wolves	AHL	14	1	4	5	2	—	—	—	—	—
2022–23	Colorado Eagles	AHL	31	2	17	19	14	—	—	—	—	—
2023–24	Toronto Marlies	AHL	3	0	0	0	0	—	—	—	—	—
2023–24	Newfoundland Growlers	ECHL	12	0	2	2	6	—	—	—	—	—
2023–24	ERC Ingolstadt	DEL	9	0	1	1	0	7	0	2	2	4
2024–25	KooKoo	Liiga	53	2	35	37	55	4	0	0	0	0
2025–26	Sibir Novosibirsk	KHL	10	0	3	3	4	—	—	—	—	—
2025–26	Augsburger Panther	DEL	9	1	1	2	0	—	—	—	—	—
NHL totals			2	0	0	0	0	—	—	—	—	—

=== International ===
Year	Team	Event	Result	GP	G	A	Pts	PIM
2015	United States	U17	6th	5	1	3	4	0
2017	United States	U18	1st place, gold medalist(s)	7	2	1	3	0
Junior totals				12	3	4	7	0

== Awards and honors ==
Award	Year	Ref
College
Hockey East First All-Star Team	2019–20, 2020–21	
AHCA East First Team All-American	2019–20, 2020–21	
