= Filip Král =

Czech professional ice hockey player (born 1999)

- Born: 20 October 1999 (age 26) Blansko, Czech Republic
- Height: 6 ft 1 in (185 cm)
- Weight: 172 lb (78 kg; 12 st 4 lb)
- Position: Defence
- Shoots: Left
- ELH team Former teams: HC Kometa Brno; Toronto Maple Leafs; Lahti Pelicans
- NHL draft: 149th overall, 2018; Toronto Maple Leafs
- Playing career: 2016–present

Filip Král (born 20 October 1999) is a Czech professional ice hockey player for HC Kometa Brno of the Czech Extraliga (ELH). He was drafted 149th overall by the Toronto Maple Leafs in the 2018 NHL entry draft.

== Playing career ==
Král began playing hockey in his hometown of Blansko at the age of three. In the Czech Republic, Král has played within the system of HC Kometa Brno, and played 27 games with the professional club across two seasons, recording two assists. In 2017, Král was drafted in the second round, 78th overall, during the CHL Import Draft by the Spokane Chiefs. He started the 2017–18 season with HC Kometa Brno, but opted out of his contract four games into the season to play in the Western Hockey League (WHL). He was signed by the Chiefs on 6 October 2017, and committed to play for the team during the 2017–18 season, marking the first time he would play outside of his native country. During his first season in North America, Král put up 35 points in 54 games, second on team scoring for defencemen (behind only Ty Smith, who was also selected during the 2018 NHL entry draft).

On 2 April 2020, Král was signed to a three-year, entry-level contract by the Toronto Maple Leafs. On 12 August, Král was assigned by the Maple Leafs to Czech second-tier club, HC ZUBR Přerov, on loan until the commencement of the delayed 2020–21 North American season.

Having appeared in two games with the Maple Leafs during the 2022–23 season, Král, as a pending restricted free agent, was not tendered a qualifying offer by the club and was released as a free agent in the summer of 2023. Král left North America and was signed to a one-year contract with Finnish club, Lahti Pelicans of the Liiga, on 14 July 2023.

Following a one-year return to North America within the Pittsburgh Penguins organization, Král returned to his original club, Kometa Brno of the Czech ELH, in signing a three-year contract on 6 May 2025.

== Career statistics ==
=== Regular season and playoffs ===
			Regular season					Playoffs
Season	Team	League	GP	G	A	Pts	PIM	GP	G	A	Pts	PIM
2016–17	HC Kometa Brno	Czech.20	13	4	6	10	10	6	3	7	10	2
2016–17	HC Kometa Brno	ELH	23	0	2	2	2	5	0	0	0	0
2016–17	SK Horácká Slavia Třebíč	Czech.1	12	1	1	2	6	—	—	—	—	—
2017–18	HC Kometa Brno	ELH	4	0	0	0	0	—	—	—	—	—
2017–18	SK Horácká Slavia Třebíč	Czech.1	3	0	0	0	2	—	—	—	—	—
2017–18	Spokane Chiefs	WHL	54	9	26	35	24	5	0	0	0	0
2018–19	Spokane Chiefs	WHL	47	10	26	36	14	12	0	2	2	4
2019–20	Spokane Chiefs	WHL	53	12	37	49	8	—	—	—	—	—
2020–21	HC ZUBR Přerov	Czech.1	7	2	8	10	4	—	—	—	—	—
2020–21	HC Kometa Brno	ELH	48	6	15	21	12	9	1	5	6	4
2020–21	Toronto Marlies	AHL	10	2	0	2	0	—	—	—	—	—
2021–22	Toronto Marlies	AHL	58	3	18	21	24	—	—	—	—	—
2022–23	Toronto Marlies	AHL	24	2	4	6	6	—	—	—	—	—
2022–23	Toronto Maple Leafs	NHL	2	0	0	0	2	—	—	—	—	—
2023–24	Lahti Pelicans	Liiga	46	5	32	37	10	17	1	7	8	8
2024–25	Wilkes-Barre/Scranton Penguins	AHL	61	7	22	29	30	2	0	1	1	0
ELH totals			75	6	17	23	14	14	1	5	6	4
NHL totals			2	0	0	0	2	—	—	—	—	—

=== International ===
Medal record

Representing Czech Republic

Ice hockey

Ivan Hlinka Memorial Tournament
Gold medal – first place	2016 Czech Republic/Slovakia	

Year	Team	Event	Result	GP	G	A	Pts	PIM
2015	Czech Republic	U17	7th	5	0	0	0	0
2016	Czech Republic	IH18	1st place, gold medalist(s)	5	0	0	0	2
2017	Czech Republic	U18	7th	5	1	1	2	0
2018	Czech Republic	WJC	4th	7	1	0	1	2
2019	Czech Republic	WJC	7th	5	1	0	1	2
Junior totals				27	3	1	4	6
