= Spiš Aréna =

Ice hockey arena in Spišská Nová Ves, Slovakia

- Interactive map of Spiš Aréna
- Location: Terézie Vansovej 10; 052 01 Spišská Nová Ves, Slovakia
- Coordinates: 48°56′35″N 20°33′34″E
- Owner: Spišská Nová Ves
- Capacity: 5,503

Construction
- Opened: 1982

Tenant
- HK Spišská Nová Ves

Spiš Arena is a sports arena in Spišská Nová Ves, Slovakia. It is primarily used for ice hockey, and is the home arena of HK Spišská Nová Ves. Spiš Arena was opened in 1982 as Zimný Štadión SNV and has a seating capacity for 5,503 people for Ice hockey games. The arena has one of only two real-time biometry and facial recognition systems in the world. It was implemented by Colosseo EAS, a Slovak company that also built the arena's game presentation system.

== Notable events ==
An overview of some sport events:

1987

- 1987 Winter Universiade

1994

- IIHF World Championship Group C1

1999

- 1999 Winter Universiade

2017

- 2017 IIHF World Under-18 Championship
