= Vladislav Yeryomenko =

Belarusian ice hockey player (born 1999)

- Born: April 24, 1999 (age 27) Vitebsk, Belarus
- Height: 6 ft 0 in (183 cm)
- Weight: 187 lb (85 kg; 13 st 5 lb)
- Position: Defence
- Shoots: Right
- KHL team Former teams: Neftekhimik Nizhnekamsk; Dinamo Minsk; Metallurg Magnitogorsk; CSKA Moscow
- National team: Belarus
- NHL draft: 151st overall, 2018; Nashville Predators
- Playing career: 2019–present

Vladislav Vitalevich Yeryomenko (Russian: Владислав Витальевич Ерёменко; born April 24, 1999) is a Belarusian professional ice hockey defenceman currently playing for HC Neftekhimik Nizhnekamsk of the Kontinental Hockey League (KHL).

== Playing career ==
Yeryomenko spent two seasons in North America playing major junior hockey for the Calgary Hitmen of the Western Hockey League (WHL). He was drafted 151st overall by the Nashville Predators in the 2018 NHL entry draft. He attended the Predators prospect and training camp but was cut from the team in September 2018 and did not sign a contract with the team, he returned for a third and final junior season with the Hitmen.

He signed his first professional contract in his native Belarus, agreeing to a deal with HC Dinamo Minsk of the Kontinental Hockey League on 19 August 2019.

Following three seasons within Dinamo Minsk, Yeryomenko left the club as a free agent and signed a two-year contract with Russian-based club, Metallurg Magnitogorsk on 17 May 2022.

After a three-year tenure on the blueline with Metallurg, Yeryomenko continued his career in the KHL by signing a one-year contract as a free agent with HC CSKA Moscow on 18 June 2025.

Yeryomenko played a lone season within CSKA, and was traded in the following off-season to HC Dynamo Moscow before immediately moving to Neftekhimik Nizhnekamsk in an exchange of player rights. He was signed to a two-year contract with Nizhnekamsk on 25 August 2026.

== Career statistics ==
=== Regular season and playoffs ===
			Regular season					Playoffs
Season	Team	League	GP	G	A	Pts	PIM	GP	G	A	Pts	PIM
2015–16	Dinamo-Raubichi	MHL	1	0	0	0	0	—	—	—	—	—
2016–17	Calgary Hitmen	WHL	62	6	19	25	28	4	0	1	1	0
2017–18	Calgary Hitmen	WHL	63	13	28	41	30	—	—	—	—	—
2018–19	Calgary Hitmen	WHL	63	7	26	33	32	11	2	3	5	15
2019–20	Dinamo Minsk	KHL	53	3	7	10	14	—	—	—	—	—
2019–20	Yunost Minsk	BHL	—	—	—	—	—	14	3	8	11	4
2020–21	Dinamo Minsk	KHL	44	4	5	9	16	—	—	—	—	—
2021–22	Dinamo Minsk	KHL	40	3	3	6	14	4	0	0	0	6
2021–22	Dinamo-Molodechno	BHL	—	—	—	—	—	2	0	1	1	2
2022–23	Metallurg Magnitogorsk	KHL	39	3	4	7	4	—	—	—	—	—
2023–24	Metallurg Magnitogorsk	KHL	31	3	5	8	2	21	0	3	3	0
2024–25	Metallurg Magnitogorsk	KHL	34	3	5	8	14	—	—	—	—	—
2025–26	CSKA Moscow	KHL	45	1	2	3	12	2	0	0	0	0
KHL totals			286	20	31	51	76	27	0	3	3	6

=== International ===
Year	Team	Event	Result	GP	G	A	Pts	PIM
2016	Belarus	WJC18-D1	11th	5	0	4	4	2
2017	Belarus	WJC18	9th	7	2	2	4	12
2017	Belarus	WJC-D1	11th	5	1	2	3	4
2018	Belarus	WJC	10th	6	1	3	4	8
2019	Belarus	WJC-D1	12th	5	0	2	2	4
2021	Belarus	WC	15th	5	1	0	1	0
2021	Belarus	OGQ	DNQ	3	0	0	0	0
Junior totals				28	4	13	17	30
Senior totals				8	1	0	1	0

== Awards and honors ==
Award	Year
KHL
Gagarin Cup (Metallurg Magnitogorsk)	2024
