= Kristian Vesalainen =

Finnish ice hockey player (born 1999)

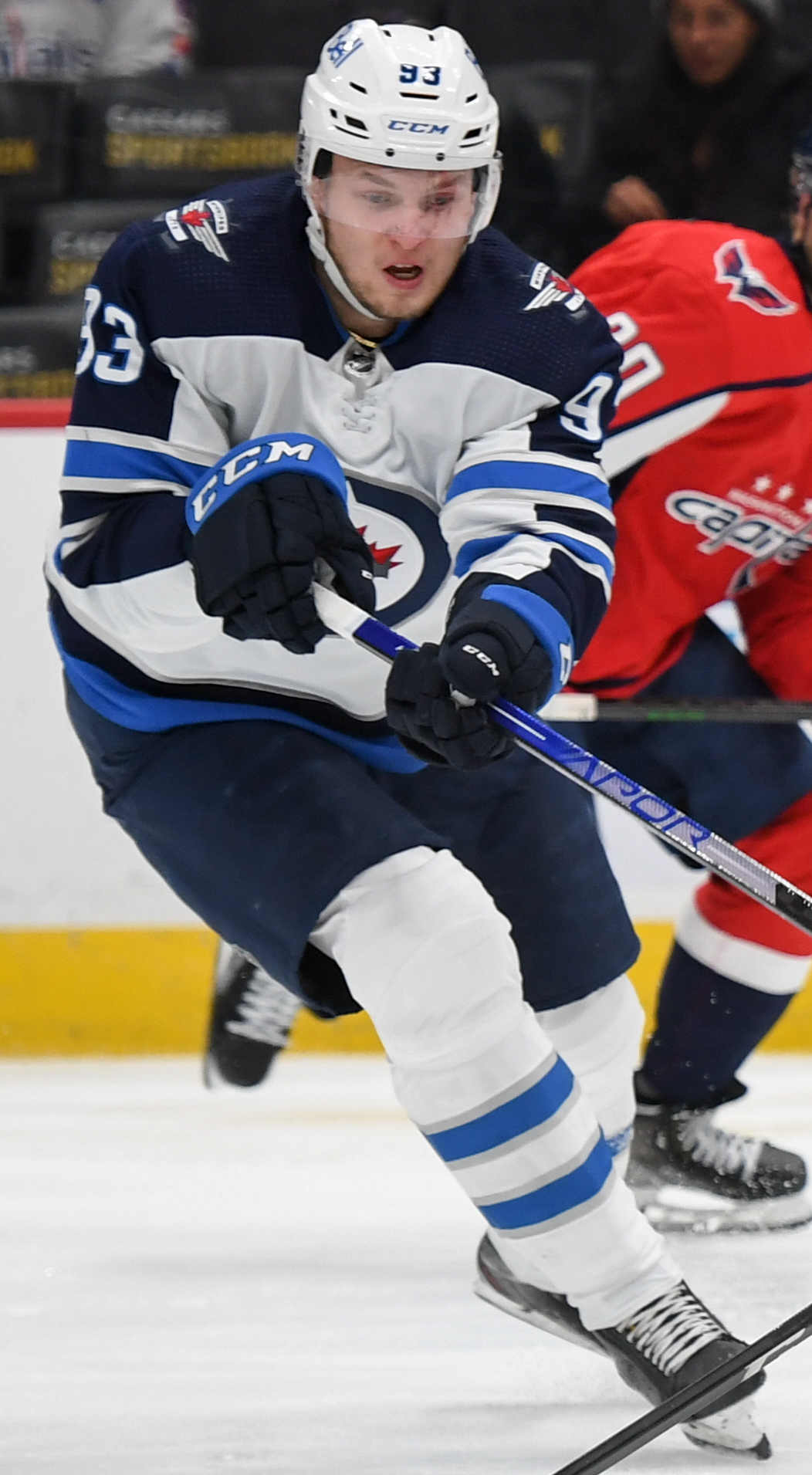
- Vesalainen with the Winnipeg Jets in 2022
- Born: 1 June 1999 (age 27) Helsinki, Finland
- Height: 6 ft 3 in (191 cm)
- Weight: 207 lb (94 kg; 14 st 11 lb)
- Position: Left wing
- Shoots: Left
- ELH team Former teams: HC Sparta Praha; Frölunda HC; Oulun Kärpät; Winnipeg Jets; Jokerit; Malmö Redhawks; HIFK; HPK
- NHL draft: 24th overall, 2017; Winnipeg Jets
- Playing career: 2015–present

Kristian Vesalainen (born 1 June 1999) is a Finnish professional ice hockey forward for HC Sparta Praha of the Czech Extraliga (ELH). Vesalainen was drafted by the Winnipeg Jets in the first round, 24th overall, in the 2017 NHL entry draft.

== Playing career ==
Vesalainen originally played as a youth in his native Finland, appearing up to the Junior A level with HIFK before opting to continue his development in Sweden with Frölunda HC on 27 August 2015. Vesalainen made his professional debut at the senior level with Frölunda in the Swedish Hockey League during the 2015–16 season. After an initial loan period to return to Finland during the 2016–17 season with HPK of the Liiga, Vesalainen made his move permanent in agreeing to a one-year deal with HPK on 28 April 2017. In his first year of eligibility, Vesalainen was selected in the first round, 24th overall, by the Winnipeg Jets at the 2017 NHL entry draft on 23 June 2017.

In the 2017–18 season, despite his age Vesalainen impressively secured a top-line role with HPK. With the club out of playoff contention and while leading the HPK in scoring with 19 goals and 39 points, Vesalainen was loaned for the remainder of the season to league leaders Oulun Kärpät on 21 February 2018. Kärpät would eventually win the Liiga championship, with Vesalainen scoring 8 points in 18 playoff games. On 26 August 2018, Vesalainen signed a three-year, $4.476 million entry-level contract with the Jets, which included an out clause that would permit him to play in Europe during the 2018–19 season if he did not make the team's roster during the training camp.

Vesalainen made his NHL debut on 4 October 2018 in a 5–1 win over the St. Louis Blues. He played 8:12 minutes of ice time and earned one assist. On 22 November, the Jets assigned Vesalainen to Jokerit of the Kontinental Hockey League (KHL).

On 21 October 2020, Vesalainen returned to HPK on loan from the Winnipeg Jets, until the commencement of the delayed North American 2020–21 season. In the following 2021–22 season, Vesalainen scored his first NHL goal against the Nashville Predators on 23 October 2021. He appeared in a career best 53 regular season games with the Jets, totalling just 3 points, before he was reassigned to close out the season with the Manitoba Moose in the AHL.

As an impending restricted free agent with the Jets, Vesalainen chose to return to Europe by signing a one-year contract with Swedish club, Malmö Redhawks of the SHL, on 23 May 2022. He opted to return to his home country in November that same year.

== Personal life ==
He is in a relationship with Finnish footballer Amanda Rantanen. In January 2025, they revealed she was expecting their first child.

== Career statistics ==
=== Regular season and playoffs ===
			Regular season					Playoffs
Season	Team	League	GP	G	A	Pts	PIM	GP	G	A	Pts	PIM
2014–15	HIFK	Jr. A	17	1	1	2	0	1	0	0	0	0
2015–16	Frölunda HC	J20	37	15	19	34	0	1	0	1	1	0
2015–16	Frölunda HC	SHL	19	1	1	2	0	5	0	0	0	2
2016–17	Frölunda HC	J20	10	4	0	4	14	5	2	1	3	0
2016–17	Frölunda HC	SHL	26	1	5	6	2	1	0	0	0	0
2016–17	HPK	Liiga	9	1	0	1	0	—	—	—	—	—
2017–18	HPK	Liiga	44	19	20	39	6	—	—	—	—	—
2017–18	Oulun Kärpät	Liiga	5	3	1	4	0	18	4	4	8	14
2018–19	Winnipeg Jets	NHL	5	0	1	1	0	—	—	—	—	—
2018–19	Manitoba Moose	AHL	22	4	9	13	10	—	—	—	—	—
2018–19	Jokerit	KHL	31	6	11	17	0	6	1	0	1	4
2019–20	Manitoba Moose	AHL	60	12	18	30	10	—	—	—	—	—
2020–21	HPK	Liiga	10	4	4	8	4	—	—	—	—	—
2020–21	Manitoba Moose	AHL	6	1	4	5	0	—	—	—	—	—
2020–21	Winnipeg Jets	NHL	12	0	1	1	0	4	0	0	0	0
2021–22	Winnipeg Jets	NHL	53	2	1	3	6	—	—	—	—	—
2021–22	Manitoba Moose	AHL	17	3	3	6	6	2	0	0	0	0
2022–23	Malmö Redhawks	SHL	15	1	2	3	0	—	—	—	—	—
2022–23	HIFK	Liiga	40	16	21	37	8	12	2	3	5	6
2023–24	HIFK	Liiga	58	14	23	37	10	7	1	1	2	0
2024–25	HIFK	Liiga	40	17	19	36	12	4	0	0	0	0
2025–26	HPK	Liiga	30	2	14	16	6	—	—	—	—	—
2025–26	HC Sparta Praha	ELH	16	3	1	4	4	12	1	0	1	0
SHL totals			60	3	8	11	2	6	0	0	0	2
Liiga totals			236	76	102	178	46	41	7	8	15	20
NHL totals			70	2	3	5	6	4	0	0	0	0

=== International ===
Medal record

Representing Finland

Ice hockey

IIHF World U18 Championship
Gold medal – first place	2016 United States	
Silver medal – second place	2017 Slovakia	

Year	Team	Event	Result	GP	G	A	Pts	PIM
2014	Finland	U17	4th	6	3	2	5	4
2015	Finland	IH18	4th	5	0	0	0	0
2015	Finland	U17	5th	5	4	4	8	4
2016	Finland	U18	1st place, gold medalist(s)	7	2	4	6	6
2017	Finland	U18	2nd place, silver medalist(s)	7	6	7	13	8
2017	Finland	WJC	9th	6	1	1	2	0
2018	Finland	WJC	6th	5	2	4	6	2
Junior totals				41	18	22	40	24

Awards and achievements
Preceded by Logan Stanley	Winnipeg Jets first-round draft pick 2017	Succeeded by Ville Heinola
