= Anton Björkman =

Swedish ice hockey player

- Born: May 13, 1999 (age 26); Linköping, Sweden
- Height: 5 ft 11 in (180 cm)
- Weight: 170 lb (77 kg; 12 st 2 lb)
- Position: Defence
- Shoots: Left
- SHL team: Linköpings HC
- Playing career: 2016–present

Anton Björkman (born May 13, 1999) is a Swedish professional ice hockey defenseman. He is currently playing with Linköpings HC of the Swedish Hockey League (SHL).

== Playing career ==
Born in Linköping, Sweden, Björkman played junior hockey, with local team Linköpings HC. In 2013–14, he debuted at the under-16 level, in the J16 SM. He also competed with a regional all-star team from Östergötland in the annual TV-pucken, an under-15 national tournament. The following season he dressed for 9 U-18 games recording 2 points. After impressive seasons in the J20 SuperElit; Björkman logged his first minutes in the Swedish Hockey League, against the Malmö Redhawks.

== Career statistics ==
=== Regular season and playoffs ===
			Regular season					Playoffs
Season	Team	League	GP	G	A	Pts	PIM	GP	G	A	Pts	PIM
2015–16	Linköpings HC	J20	13	0	0	0	4	3	0	0	0	0
2016–17	Linköpings HC	J20	27	2	2	4	18	—	—	—	—	—
2016–17	Linköpings HC	SHL	28	0	2	2	0	1	0	0	0	0
2017–18	Linköpings HC	J20	3	0	0	0	0	—	—	—	—	—
2017–18	Linköpings HC	SHL	13	0	0	0	2	—	—	—	—	—
2018–19	IK Oskarshamn	Allsv	33	0	4	4	8	12	0	2	2	6
SHL totals			41	0	2	2	2	1	0	0	0	0

=== International ===
Year	Team	Event	Result	GP	G	A	Pts	PIM
2015	Sweden	U17	3rd place, bronze medalist(s)	6	0	0	0	2
2016	Sweden	IH18	4th	5	0	1	1	4
Junior totals				11	0	1	1	6
