= Jakub Škarek =

Czech ice hockey player (born 1999)

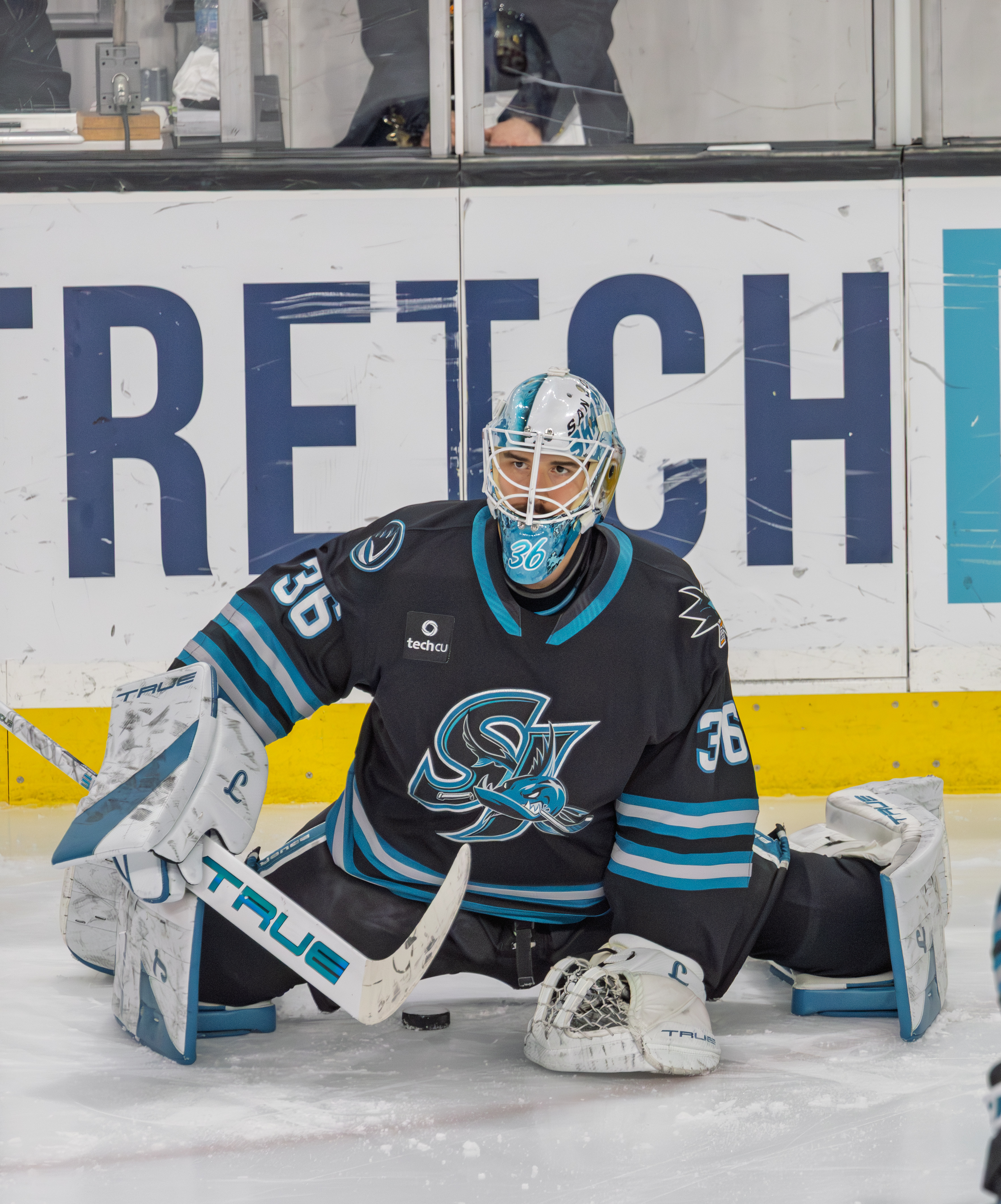
- Škarek with San Jose Barracuda in 2026
- Born: 10 November 1999 (age 26) Jihlava, Czech Republic
- Height: 6 ft 3 in (191 cm)
- Weight: 211 lb (96 kg; 15 st 1 lb)
- Position: Goaltender
- Catches: Left
- DEL team Former teams: Straubing Tigers; Sparta Praha; Dukla Jihlava; Lahti Pelicans; New York Islanders
- NHL draft: 72nd overall, 2018; New York Islanders
- Playing career: 2016–present

Jakub Škarek (born 10 November 1999) is a Czech professional ice hockey goaltender for the Straubing Tigers of the Deutsche Eishockey Liga (DEL). He was selected 72nd overall by the New York Islanders in the 2018 NHL entry draft.

== Playing career ==
Škarek originally began his playing career as a forward, however, he switched to goaltender when he was 10 years old because his team's goaltender missed a practice and the team needed a replacement.

Škarek made his professional debut with his youth club, Dukla Jihlava, before making his Czech Extraliga debut on loan with Sparta Praha during the 2016–17 season as an 18-year-old.

Returning to Dukla Jihlava after backstopping the club to promotion to the Czech Extraliga for the 2017–18 season, Škarek made 21 top flight appearances in posting a .913 save percentage.

In order to continue his development, he left Dukla Jihlava for a higher level of competition, joining the Lahti Pelicans of the Finnish Liiga for the 2018–19 season on 2 May 2018.

Škarek's potential was noticed and he was selected in the third round, 72nd overall, by the New York Islanders in the 2018 NHL entry draft. On 4 July 2018, Škarek was signed to a three-year, entry-level contract by the Islanders, with the agreement to continue his contract with the Lahti Pelicans.

On 16 November 2020, the Islanders loaned Škarek to Peliitat Heinola of Finnish Mestis until the commencement of the training camp for the pandemic delayed 2020–21 season.

On 9 May 2025, Škarek returned to Finland, signing a one-year contract that included an option for a second year with HIFK. Two months later, he was signed by the San Jose Sharks. In the 2025–26 season, Škarek played exclusively with the Sharks AHL affiliate, the San Jose Barracuda, collecting 12 wins through 20 appearances.

As a free agent from the Sharks, Škarek returned to Europe in signing a one-year contract with top tier German club, Straubing Tigers of the DEL, on 16 July 2026.

== Personal life ==
Škarek was born into a family of athletes, with his mother, Eva, competing in basketball and high jump, his father, Josef, competing in football, volleyball, triathlons, and mountain climbing, and his sister, Tereza, throwing javelin. His girlfriend Sarah Barrett is a marathon runner and a retired NFL cheerleader. In addition to his native Czech, Škarek can speak English, as well as some Russian, Slovak, Swedish, and Finnish.

== Career statistics ==
=== Regular season and playoffs ===
			Regular season									Playoffs
Season	Team	League	GP	W	L	OT	MIN	GA	SO	GAA	SV%	GP	W	L	MIN	GA	SO	GAA	SV%
2014–15	HC Dukla Jihlava	Czech.20	1	0	0	0	20	0	0	0.00	1.000	—	—	—	—	—	—	—	—
2015–16	HC Dukla Jihlava	Czech.20	9	5	4	0	540	19	3	2.11	.939	—	—	—	—	—	—	—	—
2015–16	HC Dukla Jihlava	Czech.1	20	11	9	0	1219	46	2	2.26	.931	4	4	0	248	8	1	1.94	.941
2016–17	HC Dukla Jihlava	Czech.20	1	1	0	0	60	1	0	1.00	.950	—	—	—	—	—	—	—	—
2016–17	HC Dukla Jihlava	Czech.1	28	21	7	0	1674	59	1	2.11	.924	5	3	2	306	10	1	1.96	.916
2016–17	HC Sparta Praha	ELH	4	4	0	0	245	6	1	1.47	.946	—	—	—	—	—	—	—	—
2017–18	HC Dukla Jihlava	ELH	21	9	12	0	1218	49	1	2.41	.913	—	—	—	—	—	—	—	—
2017–18	HC Stadion Litoměřice	Czech.1	10	5	5	0	600	19	0	1.90	.942	—	—	—	—	—	—	—	—
2018–19	Lahti Pelicans	Liiga	22	6	8	7	1312	54	1	2.47	.906	—	—	—	—	—	—	—	—
2018–19	Peliitat	Mestis	7	1	4	2	426	20	0	2.86	.896	—	—	—	—	—	—	—	—
2019–20	Worcester Railers	ECHL	14	3	9	2	756	47	0	3.73	.879	—	—	—	—	—	—	—	—
2019–20	Bridgeport Sound Tigers	AHL	16	3	10	1	863	47	1	3.27	.888	—	—	—	—	—	—	—	—
2020–21	Peliitat	Mestis	4	0	3	1	243	18	0	4.44	.833	—	—	—	—	—	—	—	—
2020–21	Bridgeport Sound Tigers	AHL	12	3	8	1	721	42	0	3.50	.887	—	—	—	—	—	—	—	—
2021–22	Bridgeport Islanders	AHL	37	16	15	4	2110	116	1	3.30	.896	1	0	1	71	3	0	2.54	.912
2022–23	Bridgeport Islanders	AHL	38	15	16	3	2157	121	2	3.37	.892	—	—	—	—	—	—	—	—
2023–24	Bridgeport Islanders	AHL	36	7	22	6	2116	114	0	3.23	.888	—	—	—	—	—	—	—	—
2024–25	Bridgeport Islanders	AHL	22	5	13	1	1159	68	1	3.52	.884	—	—	—	—	—	—	—	—
2024–25	New York Islanders	NHL	2	0	1	0	76	5	0	3.94	.872	—	—	—	—	—	—	—	—
2025–26	San Jose Barracuda	AHL	20	12	7	0	1154	60	1	3.12	.888	—	—	—	—	—	—	—	—
ELH totals			25	13	12	0	1,463	55	2	2.25	.919	—	—	—	—	—	—	—	—
Liiga totals			22	6	8	7	1,312	54	1	2.47	.906	—	—	—	—	—	—	—	—
NHL totals			2	0	1	0	76	5	0	3.94	.872	—	—	—	—	—	—	—	—

=== International ===
Year	Team	Event	Result	GP	W	L	OT	MIN	GA	SO	GAA	SV%
2015	Czech Republic	U17	7th	3	1	2	0	180	4	0	4.67	.863
2016	Czech Republic	IH18	1st place, gold medalist(s)	4	4	0	0	250	8	0	1.92	.930
2017	Czech Republic	WJC	6th	3	1	2	0	180	10	0	3.34	.884
2017	Czech Republic	U18	7th	4	1	2	0	170	15	0	5.29	.853
2018	Czech Republic	WJC	4th	5	1	2	0	162	14	0	5.19	.848
2019	Czech Republic	WJC	7th	1	0	0	0	20	1	0	3.00	.900
Junior totals				20	8	8	0	962	52	0	3.24	.875
