= Sasha Chmelevski =

American ice hockey player (born 1999)

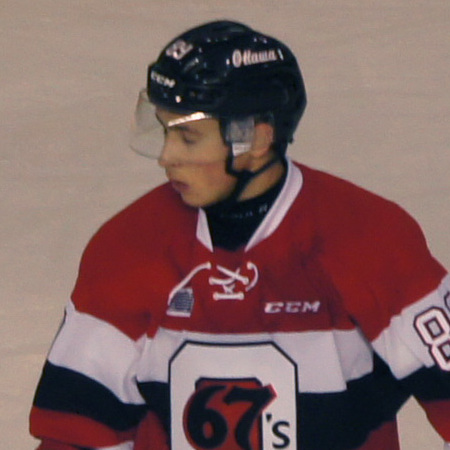
- Chmelevski with the Ottawa 67's in 2016
- Born: June 9, 1999 (age 27) Huntington Beach, California, U.S.
- Height: 6 ft 0 in (183 cm)
- Weight: 188 lb (85 kg; 13 st 6 lb)
- Position: Center
- Shoots: Right
- KHL team Former teams: Ak Bars Kazan; San Jose Sharks; Salavat Yulaev Ufa
- National team: United States
- NHL draft: 185th overall, 2017; San Jose Sharks
- Playing career: 2018–present

Alexander "Sasha" Chmelevski (born June 9, 1999) is an American professional ice hockey forward for Ak Bars Kazan of the Kontinental Hockey League (KHL). He was selected by the San Jose Sharks in the 2017 NHL entry draft, and made his NHL debut with the team in 2021.

== Playing career ==
Chmelevski played major junior in the Ontario Hockey League for four seasons. In 2015 the Sarnia Sting selected him 10th overall in the OHL Priority Selection. He joined the Sting, but was traded midway through his first season to the Ottawa 67's. He played three and a half seasons with Ottawa. At the 2017 NHL entry draft Chmelevski was selected 185th overall by the San Jose Sharks. He signed an entry-level contract with the Sharks on April 3, 2018.

In 2018 Chmelevski made his professional debut, playing six regular season games and a further four in the playoffs with the Sharks' American Hockey League affiliate, the San Jose Barracuda. He played one season with the Barracuda in 2019–20 season, cut short due to COVID-19.

He made his NHL debut on February 5, 2021, in a 5–4 shootout win over the Anaheim Ducks, recording an assist.

As a restricted free agent from the Sharks following the 2021–22 season, Chmelevski opted to sign abroad in agreeing to a one-year contract with Russian club, Salavat Yulaev Ufa of the KHL, on July 26, 2022.

== Personal life ==
Chmelevski is of Ukrainian ancestry and his family resides in Northville, Michigan since he was aged 12. Until then, he grew up in California, practicing at the KHS Ice Arena in Anaheim.

== Career statistics ==
=== Regular season and playoffs ===
			Regular season					Playoffs
Season	Team	League	GP	G	A	Pts	PIM	GP	G	A	Pts	PIM
2014–15	Honeybaked U18	HPHL	1	0	0	0	0	—	—	—	—	—
2015–16	Sarnia Sting	OHL	29	9	8	17	2	—	—	—	—	—
2015–16	Ottawa 67's	OHL	5	2	0	2	2	—	—	—	—	—
2016–17	Ottawa 67's	OHL	58	21	22	43	20	6	2	2	4	2
2017–18	Ottawa 67's	OHL	68	35	41	76	24	5	1	4	5	4
2017–18	San Jose Barracuda	AHL	6	3	1	4	0	4	1	1	2	0
2018–19	Ottawa 67's	OHL	56	35	40	75	36	18	12	19	31	10
2019–20	San Jose Barracuda	AHL	42	11	16	27	22	—	—	—	—	—
2020–21	San Jose Sharks	NHL	5	0	2	2	2	—	—	—	—	—
2020–21	San Jose Barracuda	AHL	27	9	11	20	32	—	—	—	—	—
2021–22	San Jose Barracuda	AHL	47	12	25	37	23	—	—	—	—	—
2021–22	San Jose Sharks	NHL	19	0	8	8	4	—	—	—	—	—
2022–23	Salavat Yulaev Ufa	KHL	67	26	22	48	43	6	4	1	5	4
2023–24	Salavat Yulaev Ufa	KHL	67	27	29	56	48	6	2	5	7	0
2024–25	Salavat Yulaev Ufa	KHL	68	25	32	57	49	19	8	7	15	2
2025–26	Salavat Yulaev Ufa	KHL	6	1	2	3	2	—	—	—	—	—
2025–26	Ak Bars Kazan	KHL	60	18	25	43	16	20	5	6	11	2
NHL totals			24	0	10	10	6	—	—	—	—	—
KHL totals			268	97	110	207	158	51	19	19	38	8

Medal record

Representing United States

Ice hockey

World Championships
Bronze medal – third place	2021 Latvia	

World Junior Championships
Silver medal – second place	2019 Canada	

=== International ===
Year	Team	Event	Result	GP	G	A	Pts	PIM
2015	United States	U17	6th	5	2	2	4	0
2016	United States	IH18	2nd place, silver medalist(s)	4	4	5	9	2
2019	United States	WJC	2nd place, silver medalist(s)	7	4	3	7	2
2021	United States	WC	3rd place, bronze medalist(s)	8	2	2	4	27
Junior totals				16	10	10	20	4
Senior totals				8	2	2	4	27

== Awards and honors ==
Award	Year
OHL
Bobby Smith Trophy	2017
CHL Scholastic Players of the Year	2017
Roger Neilson Memorial Award	2019
