= Robert Thomas (ice hockey) =

Canadian ice hockey player (born 1999)

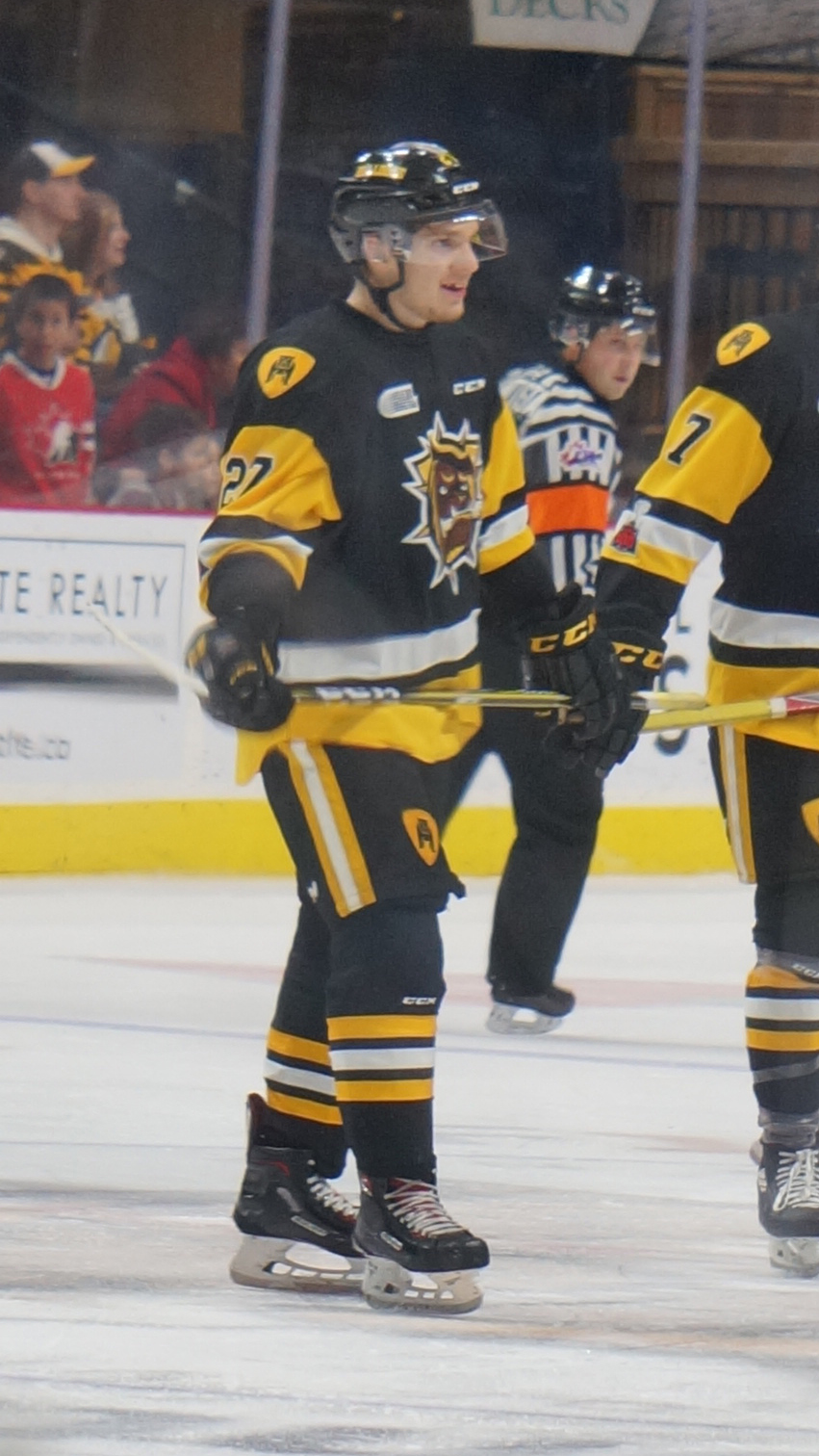
- Thomas with the Hamilton Bulldogs in 2018
- Born: July 2, 1999 (age 27) Aurora, Ontario, Canada
- Height: 6 ft 0 in (183 cm)
- Weight: 207 lb (94 kg; 14 st 11 lb)
- Position: Centre
- Shoots: Right
- NHL team: St. Louis Blues
- National team: Canada
- NHL draft: 20th overall, 2017; St. Louis Blues
- Playing career: 2018–present

Robert Thomas (born July 2, 1999) is a Canadian professional ice hockey player who is a centre and captain for the St. Louis Blues of the National Hockey League (NHL).

A native of Aurora, Ontario, Thomas played Bantam and AAA ice hockey with the York Simcoe Express before beginning his major junior ice hockey career in the Ontario Hockey League (OHL). He spent three seasons in the OHL with the London Knights and Hamilton Bulldogs. While with the Knights, Thomas won the 2016 Memorial Cup as a rookie and was drafted in the first round, 20th overall, by the Blues in the 2017 NHL entry draft. As the youngest player on the Blues' roster, Thomas won the Stanley Cup in 2019.

Internationally, Thomas has competed for the Canadian national junior team in various tournaments since 2015. He won a gold medal for his home country during the 2015 World U-17 Hockey Challenge and 2018 World Junior Championships.

== Early life ==
Thomas was born on July 2, 1999, in Aurora, Ontario. His father Scott, a chef by trade, trained Thomas for the first five years of his hockey career. His grandfather Bruce Waechter also helped by building a backyard rink out of plywood for him to train on.

== Playing career ==
=== Youth ===
Growing up in Aurora, Thomas played Bantam and AAA ice hockey with the York Simcoe Express of the Eastern AAA Minor Midget Hockey League. During the 2014–15 season, Thomas recorded 45 points in 34 games for the Express. As he grew out of Bantam hockey, Thomas played for the St. Andrew's College Saints under-16 team for two years while also attending the private school. His younger brother would also attend and graduate from the school in 2019.

=== Major junior ===
Thomas was selected by the London Knights of the OHL in the second round, 26th overall, in the 2015 Ontario Hockey League (OHL) Priority Selection. Knights coach Dale Hunter praised Thomas for his "vision, speed, hockey sense and ability to pass the puck" and considered him a replacement for former Knight Bo Horvat. In his rookie season with the Knights, Thomas recorded 15 points in 40 games as they qualified for the 2016 OHL Playoffs. He played with the team as they reached the J. Ross Robertson Cup and won the 2016 Memorial Cup. Thomas played his rookie season as a defensive forward, which he developed into a more offensive role prior to his sophomore season.

Thomas developed into a more offensive role with the Knights during the 2016–17 season and recorded a career high 66 points in 66 games. As a result, he was named to the 2017 CHL/NHL Top Prospects Game alongside teammate Alex Formenton and was the recipient of the OHL's Most Sportsmanlike Player of the Year Award. His offensive play also earned him a boost in ranking from 28th to 22nd amongst North American skaters by the NHL Central Scouting Bureau. Thomas shared his surprise at his jump in ranking by saying, "I actually was expecting, from talking to people, to go in the third round...I was talking to a lot of (U.S. schools) at the time, and when I jumped to the second, I was pretty shocked." He was eventually chosen in the first round, 20th overall, by the St. Louis Blues and invited to their rookie camp over the summer.

Following an impressive training camp and pre-season with the Blues, Thomas was signed to a three-year, entry-level contract on September 28, 2017, before he was returned to continue his development with the London Knights for the 2017–18 season. As the Knights were waiting on key players to return from their respective NHL clubs, the Knights began the season with a rocky start and a 1-4-0 record. On November 3, 2017, Thomas was named captain of the Knights, alongside alternate captains Sam Miletic, Max Jones, Cliff Pu, and Evan Bouchard. Shortly thereafter, he recorded the game-winning goal to clinch coach Dale Hunter his 700th regular season win. His run as captain was short-lived, however, as on January 8, 2018, Thomas was traded to the Hamilton Bulldogs in exchange for Connor McMichael and five draft picks. While with the Bulldogs, Thomas was suspended five games for slashing Peterborough Petes forward Zach Gallant in the mouth, though he still finished the regular season tied for 20th around the league in scoring. He continued his scoring success during the 2018 OHL Playoffs and recorded 32 points in 21 games to help the team clinch the J. Ross Robertson Cup. As a result of his success, Thomas was awarded the Wayne Gretzky 99 Award as MVP of the playoffs.

=== Professional ===
Upon the conclusion of the 2018 Memorial Cup Semifinal game, Thomas revealed he suffered an ankle injury during the Bulldogs series against the Sault Ste. Marie Greyhounds. As a result, Thomas was unable to attend the Blues' development camp, but was medically cleared to play during the Blues' Rookie Camp on September 5, 2018. Thomas eventually made the Blues' opening night roster for the 2018–19 season, and subsequently made his NHL debut on October 4 against the Winnipeg Jets. However, during the following six games, Thomas was a healthy scratch in the Blues' lineup for two of them. Working his way back into the lineup, Thomas recorded his first NHL point on October 12 in a 5–3 win over the Calgary Flames, and his first NHL goal on November 21 in a 4–1 loss to the Nashville Predators. Thomas remained on the team's roster for the entirety of the season and finished with 33 points in 70 games as the Blues qualified for the 2019 Stanley Cup playoffs.

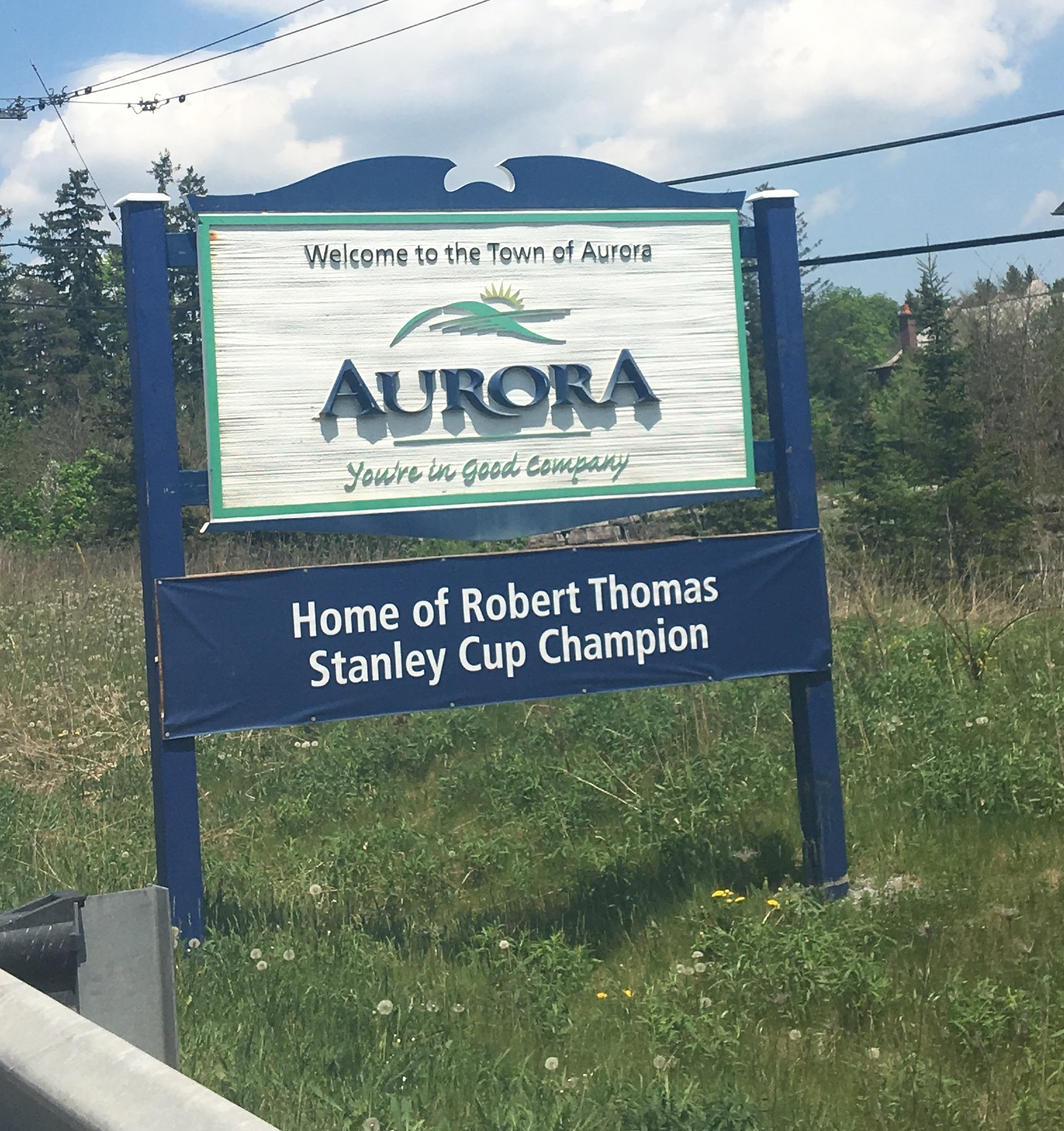
"Home of Robert Thomas" city sign in Aurora

At the age of 19, Thomas helped the Blues advance to the conference finals by assisting on both goals during game seven of the Western Conference Second Round against the Dallas Stars. Afterwards, former Blues player Keith Tkachuk said, "For someone that young, to clearly stand out in a game seven from start to finish, was one of the best performances you have ever seen in the National Hockey League, in my opinion." As the youngest player competing during the Western Conference Final against the San Jose Sharks, he suffered a wrist injury during game six as the Blues beat the Sharks. He returned to the lineup for game one of the 2019 Stanley Cup Final against the Boston Bruins, but suffered another injury and was out of the lineup until game six. His efforts during the postseason helped the Blues win their first Stanley Cup in franchise history. Upon winning the Cup, Thomas' hometown of Aurora added a sign underneath their city's welcome sign stating "Home of Robert Thomas, Stanley Cup champion."

Prior to the 2019–20 season, Thomas underwent surgery to repair a tendon in his left wrist. He was eventually medically cleared to play and was once again named to the Blues' opening night roster. Leading up to opening night, Thomas was expected to have a breakout season and a "Smooth sophomore season" in the top six. Although the NHL suspended play due to COVID-19, Thomas placed fifth on the team in goals per game and first with primary assists. During the pause in play, Thomas captained a league-wide Fortnite tournament for charity with teammates Vince Dunn and Jordan Kyrou. Together, they finished in second place and donated $50,000 to the St. Louis Children's Hospital, $25,000 to the St. Louis Area Foodbank, and $25,000 to muscular dystrophy research.

Thomas began the shortened 2020–21 season strong by tallying one goal and five assists for six points through the first 12 games of the season. However, he suffered a thumb injury on February 6, 2021, and was expected to be sidelined for 4–6 weeks. Thomas returned to the Blues' lineup for their game against the Golden Knights on March 22, 2021, over a month after his initial injury. He was a minus-1 in 13:26 minutes of ice time as the Blues fell 5–1. However, his return was shortlived as he suffered a lower body injury during a game against the Minnesota Wild on April 10. He subsequently missed four games before rejoining the Blues on April 23. Thomas signed a two-year, $5.6 million contract extension with the Blues on September 21, 2021.

On July 13, 2022, Thomas signed an eight-year, $65 million extension with the Blues.

Ahead of the 2026–27 season, on September 2, 2026, Thomas was named the Blues' captain, succeeding Brayden Schenn.

== International play ==
Medal record

Representing Canada

Ice hockey

World Junior Championships
Gold medal – first place	2018 USA	

Representing Canada White

World U-17 Hockey Challenge
Gold medal – first place	2015 British Columbia	

As a citizen of Canada, Thomas has competed for the Canadian national junior team in various tournaments since 2015. During his rookie season with the London Knights, Thomas was released by the team to allow him to compete with the Canadian national junior team at the 2015 World U-17 Hockey Challenge. He played in six games and recorded one point for Team Canada White as they clinched a gold medal.

On June 20, 2017, Thomas was selected to attend the Canada men's national junior ice hockey team U20 Team Summer Development Camp prior to the 2018 World Junior Ice Hockey Championships. Playing alongside fellow Blues prospect Jordan Kyrou, Thomas helped Canada clinch a gold medal after a 3–1 win against the Sweden men's national junior ice hockey team.

== Player profile ==
Thomas has drawn comparisons to Patrice Bergeron, with Blues' Development Coach Tim Taylor saying:

Not to throw names out there, but we believe he's like a Jonathan Toews for our team, a Patrice Bergeron, a guy that can go out and do everything. Right now, we don't want to put that pressure on him. We just want him to be the player that he is. But I think that we believe he has those leadership qualities. His structure on the ice is impeccable. His two-way game, two-way faceoffs were really good this year. We have high expectations for him and he has them for himself, too.

== Career statistics ==
=== Regular season and playoffs ===
			Regular season					Playoffs
Season	Team	League	GP	G	A	Pts	PIM	GP	G	A	Pts	PIM
2014–15	York Simcoe Express	ETAMMHL	34	18	27	45	22	—	—	—	—	—
2015–16	London Knights	OHL	40	3	12	15	0	15	1	4	5	2
2016–17	London Knights	OHL	66	16	50	66	26	14	3	9	12	6
2017–18	London Knights	OHL	27	20	26	46	18	—	—	—	—	—
2017–18	Hamilton Bulldogs	OHL	22	4	25	29	19	21	12	20	32	14
2018–19	St. Louis Blues	NHL	70	9	24	33	14	21	1	5	6	10
2019–20	St. Louis Blues	NHL	66	10	32	42	18	8	1	2	3	2
2020–21	St. Louis Blues	NHL	33	3	9	12	10	4	0	3	3	2
2021–22	St. Louis Blues	NHL	72	20	57	77	16	12	2	4	6	10
2022–23	St. Louis Blues	NHL	73	18	47	65	22	—	—	—	—	—
2023–24	St. Louis Blues	NHL	82	26	60	86	48	—	—	—	—	—
2024–25	St. Louis Blues	NHL	70	21	60	81	20	7	2	6	8	4
2025–26	St. Louis Blues	NHL	64	25	39	64	24	—	—	—	—	—
NHL totals			530	132	328	460	172	52	6	20	26	28

=== International ===
Year	Team	Event	Result	GP	G	A	Pts	PIM
2015	Canada White	U17	1st place, gold medalist(s)	6	0	1	1	0
2018	Canada	WJC	1st place, gold medalist(s)	7	1	5	6	0
2026	Canada	WC	4th	10	3	3	6	4
Junior totals				13	1	6	7	0
Senior totals				10	3	3	6	4

== Awards and honours ==
Award	Year	Ref
OHL
J. Ross Robertson Cup champion	2016, 2018	
Memorial Cup champion	2016	
Wayne Gretzky 99 Award	2018	
NHL
Stanley Cup champion	2019	
NHL All-Star	2024	

Awards and achievements
Preceded by Tage Thompson	St. Louis Blues first-round draft pick 2017	Succeeded by Klim Kostin
Sporting positions
Preceded by Brayden Schenn	St. Louis Blues captain 2026–present	Incumbent
