= Klim Kostin =

Russian ice hockey player (born 1999)

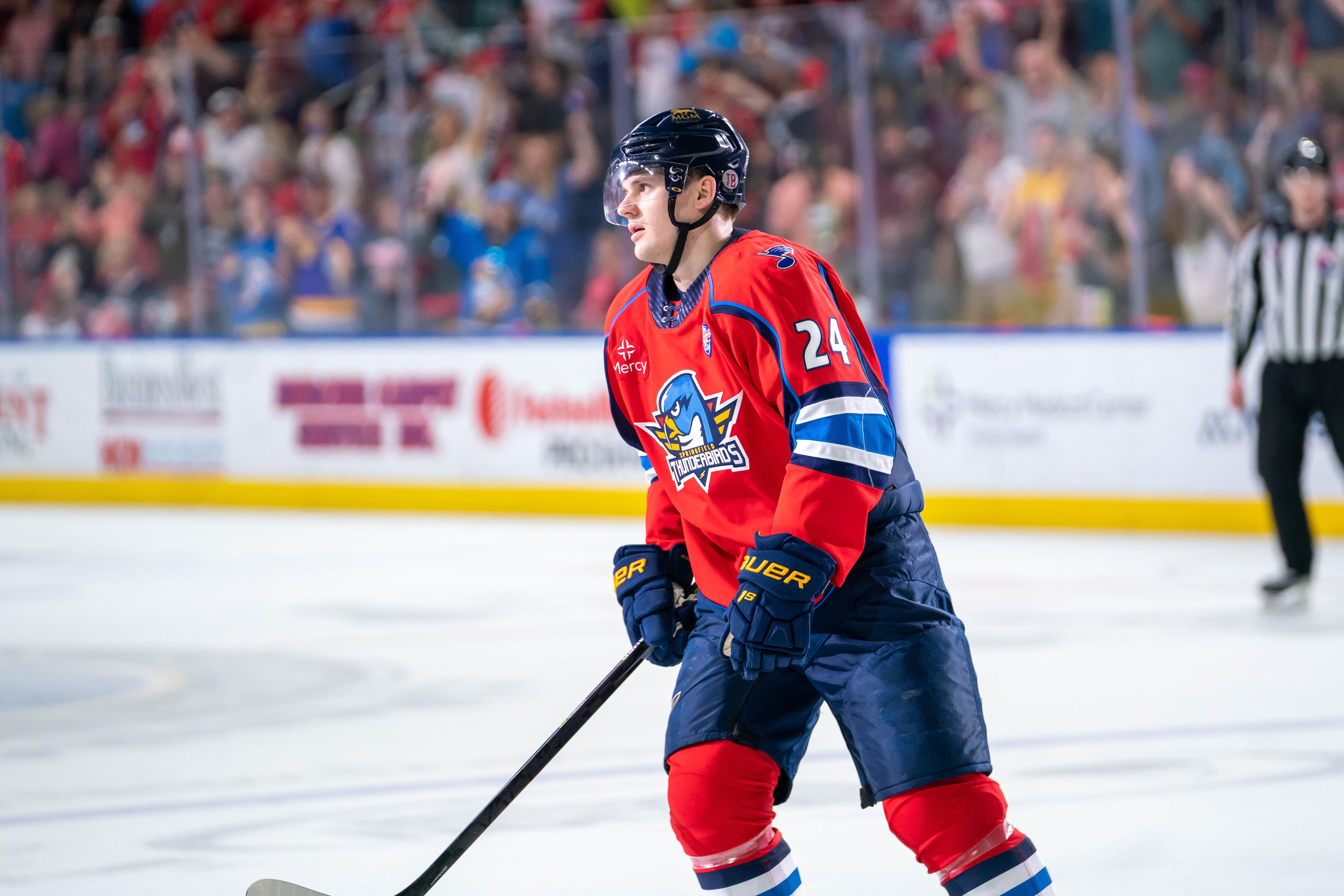
- Kostin with the Springfield Thunderbirds in 2022
- Born: 5 May 1999 (age 27) Penza, Russia
- Height: 6 ft 4 in (193 cm)
- Weight: 232 lb (105 kg; 16 st 8 lb)
- Position: Winger
- Shoots: Left
- KHL team Former teams: CSKA Moscow; Dynamo Moscow; St. Louis Blues; Avangard Omsk; Edmonton Oilers; Detroit Red Wings; San Jose Sharks
- NHL draft: 31st overall, 2017; St. Louis Blues
- Playing career: 2017–present

Klim Sergeyevich Kostin (Russian: Клим Сергеевич Костин; born 5 May 1999) is a Russian professional ice hockey winger who currently plays for HC CSKA Moscow of the Kontinental Hockey League (KHL). Considered a top prospect for the 2017 NHL entry draft, Kostin was selected 31st overall by the St. Louis Blues, and made his NHL debut with them in 2019. Kostin previously played for Dynamo Moscow and Avangard Omsk of the KHL. Internationally, Kostin has played for the Russian national junior team at several tournaments.

== Playing career ==
Kostin debuted for HC MVD in the Junior Hockey League (MHL) during the 2015–16 season. In 30 games for the team he scored 8 goals and 13 assists.

Kostin was selected first overall in the 2016 CHL Import Draft by the Kootenay Ice of the Western Hockey League (WHL), a major junior league in Canada, but he decided to stay in Russia with Dynamo Moscow for the 2016–17 season. He was reluctant to play on a junior team in North America, instead preferring to play for a senior team, either in the NHL or American Hockey League (AHL), the top minor league affiliate for the NHL.

Kostin only played 18 games in the 2016–17 season, split between Dynamo Moscow and their junior league affiliate Dynamo Balashikha, scoring one goal before he had to end his season due to shoulder surgery in January. Despite this, he was ranked the No. 1 European skater by NHL Central Scouting, stating he has proved in earlier viewings that he has the necessary tools to excel at the next level. He was described as close to a complete package with a good combination of size and mobility. Kostin was also described as a power forward, one who was both able to score and help others score.

Through playing a limited number of games, Kostin was taken with the last pick in the first round of the 2017 NHL entry draft by the St. Louis Blues. Initially thought to continue developing in Russia, Kostin was made a free agent after Dynamo Moscow were forced to release all of their players through a violation of KHL rules on 4 July 2017. The following day, Kostin agreed to a three-year entry-level contract with the St. Louis Blues. Kostin has said that he would prefer to play in the NHL for the 2017–18 season, though would not oppose going to the American Hockey League (AHL), the top minor league affiliate for the NHL; however he had no interest in playing in the WHL, or any junior league.

Kostin scored his first career NHL goal with the St. Louis Blues during the 2019–20 season on 23 November 2019, in a 4–2 loss to the Nashville Predators.

Approaching the 2022–23 season, his sixth year within the Blues organization, Kostin was unable to clinch a role on the opening night roster and was placed on waivers before he was re-assigned to AHL affiliate, the Springfield Thunderbirds. On 9 October 2022, Kostin was traded by the Blues to the Edmonton Oilers in exchange for fellow Russian, Dmitri Samorukov. He was immediately re-assigned by the Oilers to continue in the AHL with affiliate, the Bakersfield Condors. On 9 November, Kostin was called up to the Oilers after left winger Evander Kane was injured.

On 29 June 2023, Kostin, as a pending restricted free agent, was traded to the Detroit Red Wings, along with Kailer Yamamoto, in exchange for future considerations. While initially not tendered to a qualifying offer by the Red Wings, Kostin was signed to a two-year, $4 million contract with the Red Wings on the opening day of free agency on 1 July.

On 8 March 2024, Kostin was traded to the San Jose Sharks in exchange for Radim Šimek and a 2024 seventh-round pick.

He achieved a Gordie Howe hat trick in an 8–5 win over the Seattle Kraken on 29 November 2024. He scored a goal in the first period, assisted on one by Mikael Granlund in the second, and fought Will Borgen in the third.

On 3 November 2025, Kostin returned to play for Avangard Omsk in the Kontinental Hockey League, signing a contract for the remainder of the 2025-26 season. Kostin registered just 2 assists through 21 appearances with Avangard before he was traded to CSKA Moscow in exchange for Kirill Dolzhenkov on 25 January 2026. After settling with CSKA, Kostin opted to extend his tenure in Moscow, agreeing to a three-year contract extension on 30 April 2026.

== International play ==
Medal record

Representing Russia

Ice hockey

World Junior Championships
Bronze medal – third place	2019 Canada	

Ivan Hlinka Memorial Tournament
Bronze medal – third place	2016 Czech Republic/Slovakia	

Kostin made his international debut at the 2016 IIHF World U18 Championships, serving as captain of the Russian U-18 team. He recorded four assists in five games as the team finished sixth. Later that year he participated in the 2016 Ivan Hlinka Memorial Tournament, an under-18 tournament not sanctioned by the International Ice Hockey Federation but considered a top tournament for the age group. Again captain of the team, he had four goals and three assists in five games as the team won a bronze medal. He also played in the CHL Canada/Russia Series, an annual tournament between CHL All-Star teams and the Russian national junior team, scoring two points in five games.

== Personal life ==
Kostin was born and raised in Penza. His family owns a butcher shop in the city. At the age of 12 Kostin moved to Moscow, living with his grandmother, in order to further his hockey career, and enrolled in the Dynamo Moscow program.

== Career statistics ==
=== Regular season and playoffs ===
			Regular season					Playoffs
Season	Team	League	GP	G	A	Pts	PIM	GP	G	A	Pts	PIM
2015–16	HK MVD Balashikha	MHL	30	8	13	21	74	—	—	—	—	—
2016–17	Dynamo Moscow	KHL	8	0	0	0	27	—	—	—	—	—
2016–17	Dynamo Balashikha	VHL	9	1	0	1	4	—	—	—	—	—
2016–17	HK MVD Balashikha	MHL	1	0	1	1	2	—	—	—	—	—
2017–18	San Antonio Rampage	AHL	67	6	22	28	72	—	—	—	—	—
2018–19	San Antonio Rampage	AHL	66	10	14	24	102	—	—	—	—	—
2019–20	San Antonio Rampage	AHL	48	13	17	30	59	—	—	—	—	—
2019–20	St. Louis Blues	NHL	4	1	0	1	0	—	—	—	—	—
2020–21	Avangard Omsk	KHL	43	7	11	18	50	24	5	4	9	44
2020–21	St. Louis Blues	NHL	2	0	1	1	0	—	—	—	—	—
2021–22	St. Louis Blues	NHL	40	4	5	9	23	—	—	—	—	—
2021–22	Springfield Thunderbirds	AHL	17	3	3	6	15	18	4	4	8	32
2022–23	Bakersfield Condors	AHL	9	2	2	4	15	—	—	—	—	—
2022–23	Edmonton Oilers	NHL	57	11	10	21	66	12	3	2	5	9
2023–24	Detroit Red Wings	NHL	33	3	1	4	38	—	—	—	—	—
2023–24	San Jose Sharks	NHL	19	5	5	10	15	—	—	—	—	—
2024–25	San Jose Sharks	NHL	35	1	6	7	27	—	—	—	—	—
2025–26	Avangard Omsk	KHL	21	0	2	2	16	—	—	—	—	—
2025–26	CSKA Moscow	KHL	10	2	1	3	2	10	0	0	0	6
KHL totals			82	9	14	23	95	34	5	4	9	50
NHL totals			190	25	28	53	169	12	3	2	5	9

=== International ===
Year	Team	Event	Result	GP	G	A	Pts	PIM
2015	Russia	U17	2nd place, silver medalist(s)	6	2	3	5	16
2016	Russia	U18	6th	5	0	4	4	4
2016	Russia	IH18	3rd place, bronze medalist(s)	5	4	3	7	29
2018	Russia	WJC	5th	5	5	3	8	2
2019	Russia	WJC	3rd place, bronze medalist(s)	7	3	3	6	10
Junior totals				28	14	16	30	61

== Awards and honors ==
Award	Year	Ref
KHL
Gagarin Cup champion	2021	

Awards and achievements
Preceded by Robert Thomas	St. Louis Blues first-round draft pick 2017	Succeeded by Dominik Bokk
