= Lucas Elvenes =

Swedish ice hockey player (born 1999)

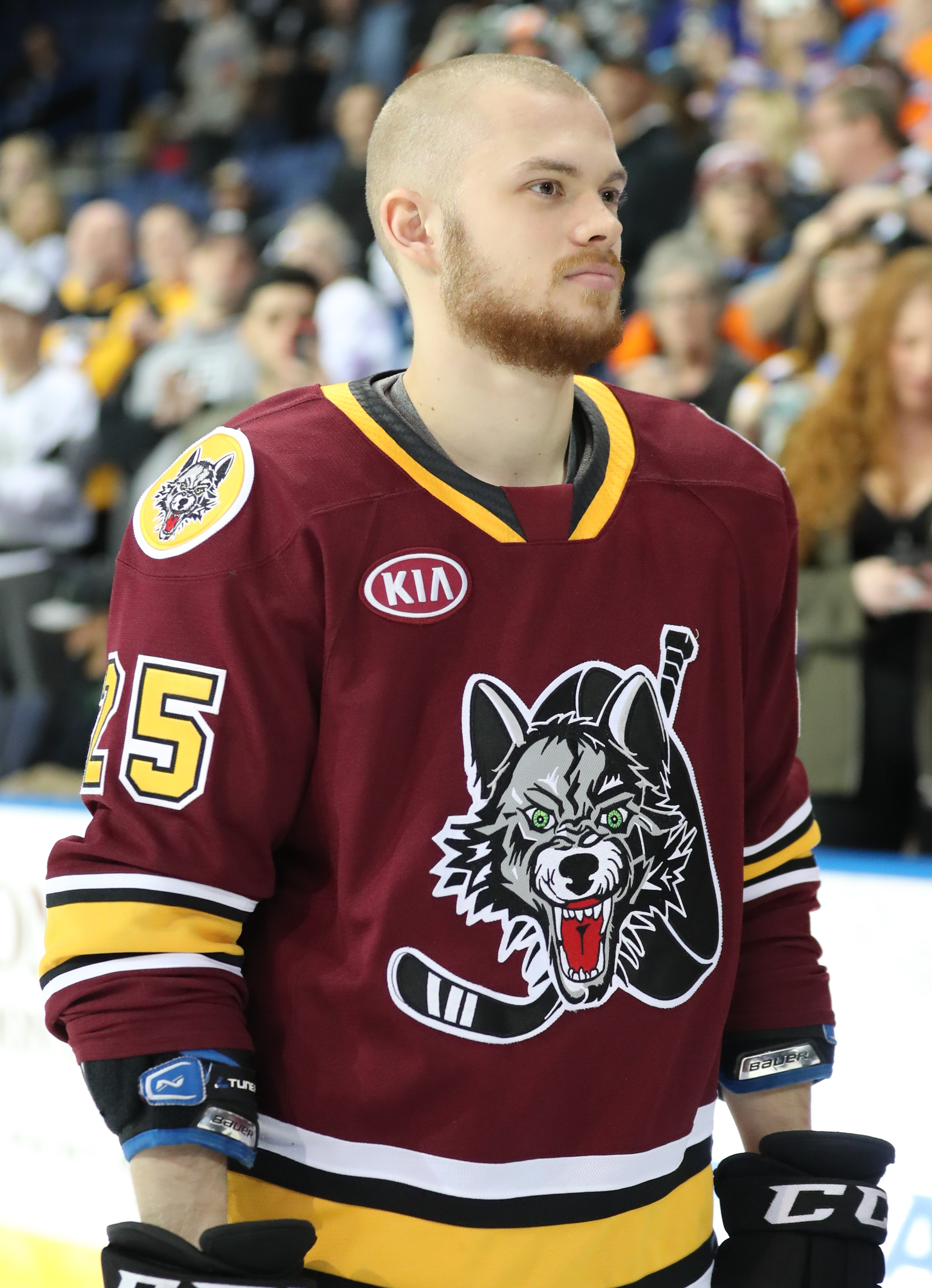
- Elvenes with the Chicago Wolves in 2020
- Born: 18 August 1999 (age 26) Ängelholm, Sweden
- Height: 183 cm (6 ft 0 in)
- Weight: 78.5 kg (173 lb; 12 st 5 lb)
- Position: Centre
- Shoots: Left
- SHL team Former teams: Växjö Lakers; Rögle BK; HV71; Leksands IF
- NHL draft: 127th overall, 2017; Vegas Golden Knights
- Playing career: 2016–present

Lucas Elvenes (born 18 August 1999), is a Swedish professional ice hockey forward currently playing for Växjö Lakers of the Swedish Hockey League (SHL). At the 2017 NHL entry draft, Elvenes was selected 127th overall by the Vegas Golden Knights.

== Personal life ==
Lucas' father, Stefan Elvenes, was drafted in the fourth round of the 1988 NHL entry draft by the Chicago Blackhawks. He never played in North America, but played in the Swedish Hockey League and for Sweden's national team. Lucas' grandfather Björn emigrated from Norway in 1965.

== Playing career ==
On June 16, 2018, Elvenes was signed to a three-year, entry-level contract with the Vegas Golden Knights. After attending the Golden Knights 2018 training camp, Elvenes was returned on loan to continue his development with Rögle BK of the SHL for the duration of the 2018–19 season on September 19, 2018.

Elvenes, while on loan with Rögle BK, established new career bests with 17 assists and 20 points through 42 regular-season games. After an early post-season exit, Elvenes was re-assigned by the Golden Knights to join AHL affiliate, the Chicago Wolves, during their playoff run.

During the 2021–22 season, on January 10, 2022, Elvenes was placed on unconditional waivers for contract termination by the Golden Knights. The Anaheim Ducks claimed him off waivers the next day. Elvenes remained in North America, accepting an assignment to the Ducks AHL affiliate, the San Diego Gulls. In regaining his scoring touch with the Gulls, Elvenes collected 9 goals and 33 points through 43 regular-season games.

As an impending restricted free agent with the Ducks, Elvenes opted to return to his native Sweden after signing a two-year contract with newly promoted club HV71 of the SHL, on 24 May 2022. Elvenes made just 3 appearances with HV71 to open the 2022–23 season before opting to end his contract and transfer to fellow SHL outfit, Leksands IF, on a three-year contract on 3 October 2022.

Following his third season with Leksands, Elvenes left the club to sign a two-year contract with fellow SHL club, Växjö Lakers, on 13 April 2025.

== Career statistics ==
=== Regular season and playoffs ===
			Regular season					Playoffs
Season	Team	League	GP	G	A	Pts	PIM	GP	G	A	Pts	PIM
2015–16	Rögle BK	J20	21	4	10	14	14	7	2	3	5	0
2016–17	Rögle BK	J20	41	15	30	45	22	3	1	1	2	2
2016–17	Rögle BK	SHL	12	0	0	0	0	—	—	—	—	—
2017–18	IK Oskarshamn	Allsv	22	4	17	21	10	7	2	5	7	8
2017–18	Rögle BK	SHL	28	5	11	16	10	—	—	—	—	—
2018–19	Rögle BK	SHL	42	3	17	20	4	2	0	1	1	0
2019–20	Chicago Wolves	AHL	59	12	36	48	18	—	—	—	—	—
2020–21	Henderson Silver Knights	AHL	37	6	18	24	21	3	0	1	1	0
2021–22	Henderson Silver Knights	AHL	20	2	8	10	4	—	—	—	—	—
2021–22	San Diego Gulls	AHL	43	9	24	33	16	2	0	1	1	2
2022–23	HV71	SHL	3	0	0	0	0	—	—	—	—	—
2022–23	Leksands IF	SHL	41	8	14	22	8	3	0	1	1	0
2023–24	Leksands IF	SHL	52	12	25	37	14	7	0	4	4	2
2024–25	Leksands IF	SHL	38	3	27	30	39	—	—	—	—	—
SHL totals			216	31	94	125	75	12	0	6	6	2

=== International ===
Year	Team	Event	Result	GP	G	A	Pts	PIM
2015	Sweden	U17	3rd place, bronze medalist(s)	6	2	3	5	6
2016	Sweden	IH18	4th	5	1	2	3	2
2017	Sweden	U18	4th	7	0	3	3	2
2019	Sweden	WJC	5th	5	1	3	4	2
Junior totals				23	4	11	15	12

== Awards and honors ==
Awards	Year
AHL
All-Star Game	2020
