= Shane Bowers (ice hockey) =

Canadian ice hockey player (born 1999)

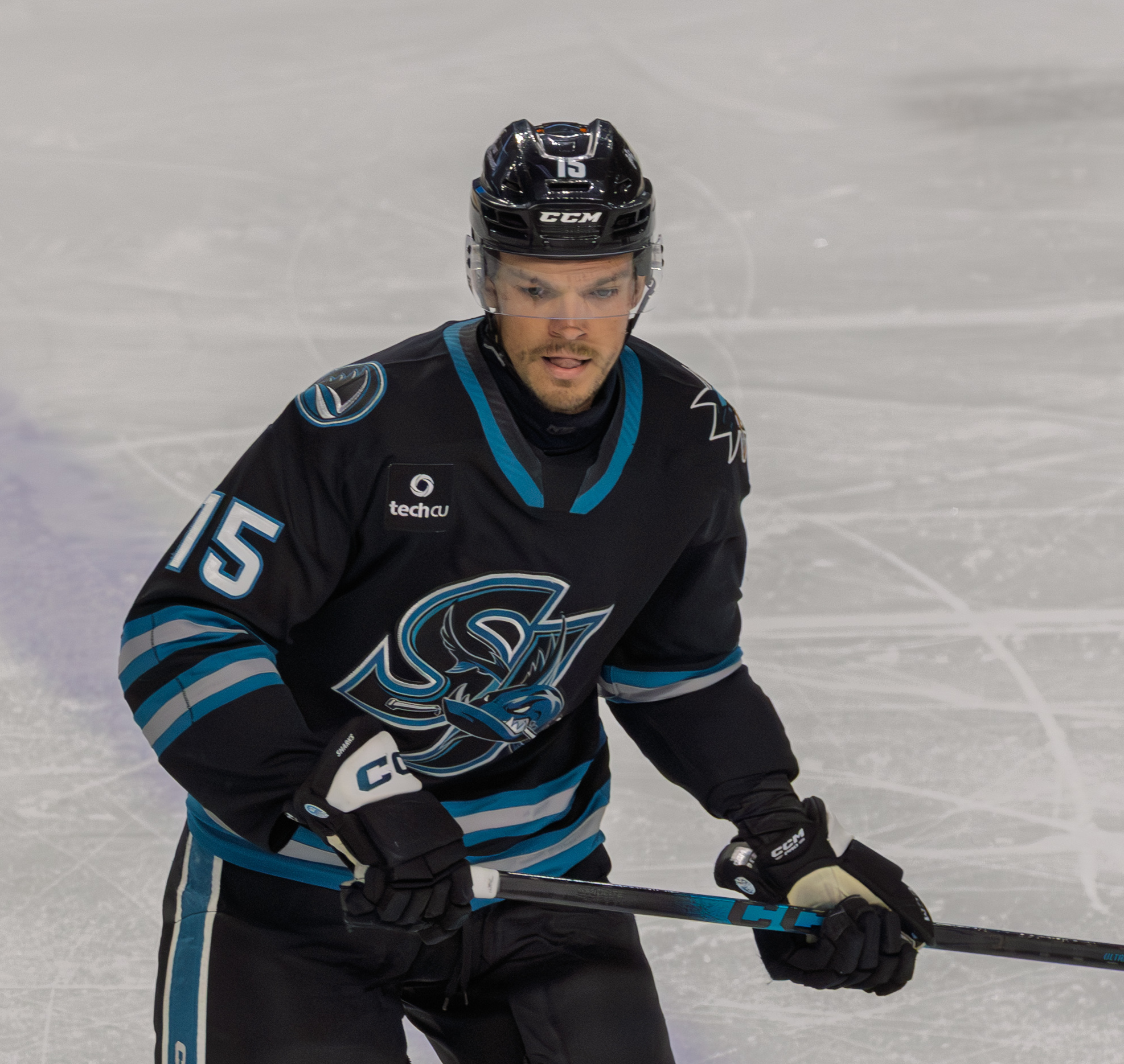
- Bowers with the San Jose Barracuda in 2026
- Born: July 30, 1999 (age 27) Halifax, Nova Scotia, Canada
- Height: 6 ft 2 in (188 cm)
- Weight: 186 lb (84 kg; 13 st 4 lb)
- Position: Centre
- Shoots: Left
- AHL team Former teams: Belleville Senators; Colorado Avalanche; New Jersey Devils
- NHL draft: 28th overall, 2017; Ottawa Senators
- Playing career: 2019–present

Shane Bowers (born July 30, 1999) is a Canadian professional ice hockey forward who is currently playing with the Belleville Senators in the American Hockey League (AHL). Bowers was drafted in the first round, 28th overall, of the 2017 NHL entry draft by the Ottawa Senators. He never played for the Senators, but he has previously played for the Colorado Avalanche and New Jersey Devils.

== Playing career ==
=== Amateur ===
Bowers, a Herring Cove native, first played in Halifax, Nova Scotia as a standout at the Bantam level for the Bubba Ray's Gulls before playing in the Nova Scotia Major Midget Hockey League with the Halifax McDonald's.

In the 2014–15 season, Bowers was selected as the NSMMHL's MVP, registering most goals and points in both the regular and post-season. Bowers twice turned down opportunities to play in the Canadian Hockey League (CHL) for a major junior ice hockey team in his native Canada after he was selected in consecutive Quebec Major Junior Hockey League Entry Drafts by the Cape Breton Screaming Eagles and Saint John Sea Dogs. He opted to instead play in the United States, after he was selected 38th overall by the Waterloo Black Hawks in the 2015 United States Hockey League Futures Draft.

Joining the Black Hawks for the 2015–16 season, Bowers showed his two-way potential in contributing with 15 goals and 33 points, leading all in 56 games, leading all Waterloo rookies to earn a selection to the All-Rookie Second Team. In returning for his second season with Waterloo in 2016–17, Bowers announced his intention on pursuing a collegiate career, committing to Boston University of the Hockey East. In playing on the Black Hawks' top line, Bowers improved his season totals finishing 10th in the league scoring in producing 22 goals, 29 assists for 51 points in 60 games. He earned the USHL Third All-Star Team honors, however Waterloo was unable to advance past the Western Conference finals in a 3–2 series defeat against the Sioux City Musketeers.

Approaching the 2017 NHL entry draft, Bowers was the 16th-ranked North American skater by the NHL Central Scouting Bureau before being selected 28th overall in the first round by the Ottawa Senators. In joining the Boston Terriers as a freshman for the 2017–18 season, Bowers made his collegiate debut, scoring a goal against Union College on September 30, 2017. He scored in his first three NCAA games, including his first multi-goal game against Minnesota State University on October 14, 2017.

On November 5, 2017, Bowers' NHL rights were included by the Senators in a blockbuster three-way deal, heading to Colorado Avalanche in exchange for Matt Duchene. In continuing with the Terriers, Bowers appeared in all 40 games and finished third on the team with 32 points and second in goals with 17. Bowers had a team-best plus-16 rating and on March 14, 2018, Bowers and teammate Brady Tkachuk were selected to the Hockey East Rookie Team. Bowers also received an honourable mention for the Hockey East all-star squads, but was not selected for those teams.

In the 2018–19 season, Bowers returned for his sophomore season with the Terriers. Under the reign of new head coach Albie O'Connell, Boston struggled to replicate their previous seasons success, failing to qualify for the NCAA Tournament. Bowers playing in a second-line role finished third on the team with 11 goals and fourth in scoring with 21 points in 37 games.

=== Professional ===
After two seasons with Boston University, Bowers opted to conclude his collegiate career, turning pro in signing a three-year, entry-level contract with the Colorado Avalanche on March 29, 2019. He was immediately signed by the Avalanche's American Hockey League (AHL) affiliate, the Colorado Eagles, on an amateur try-out contract in their bid for a playoff berth.

During the 2022–23 season, Bowers made his NHL debut with the Avalanche on November 10, 2022, against the Nashville Predators. However, he suffered an injury and had to leave the game after less than two minutes of ice time. On December 14, 2022, in returning from injury he was re-assigned to continue with the Colorado Eagles. Bowers added 14 points through 37 games with the Eagles before he was traded by the Avalanche to the Boston Bruins in exchange for Keith Kinkaid on February 25, 2023. Assigned directly to their AHL affiliate, the Providence Bruins, Bowers played out the remainder of the season in posting 3 goals and 7 points through 20 regular season games.

As an impending restricted free agent, Bowers brief tenure with the Bruins ended after he was traded to the New Jersey Devils in exchange for Reilly Walsh on June 26, 2023. He was signed to a one-year, two-way contract with the Devils for the 2023–24 season on June 29, 2023. Bowers failed to make the Devils out of training camp and was placed on waivers for the purposes of being assigned to the Devils AHL affiliate, the Utica Comets. On January 9, 2024, Bowers was recalled from Utica, playing in three games with the Devils before being returned to the AHL after Timo Meier returned from injury. After his return to Utica, Bowers missed most of February and March with an injury. In his second game after returning to the Comets' lineup, on March 30, 2024, Bowers registered two goals and four points in a 4–3 win over the Springfield Thunderbirds. He was recalled again by New Jersey on April 7 and played in five games with the Devils before being returned to Utica on April 16 to finish the season. In 36 games with Utica, Bowers scored six goals and eight points in 38 games.

On April 30, 2024, Bowers was re-signed by the Devils to a two-year, two-way contract extension. Approaching his final season under contract with the Devils, on July 2, 2025, he was traded by the Devils to the San Jose Sharks in exchange for Thomas Bordeleau.

As a free at the conlusion of his contract with the Sharks, Bowers remained un-signed over the summer leading into the 2026–27 season. On October 2, 2026, Bowers was signed to a professional tryout contract to join the Belleville Senators of the AHL, affiliate to his original draft club the Ottawa Senators.

== International play ==
Bowers made his international debut, captaining Canada Black at the 2015 World U-17 Hockey Challenge before playing at the 2016 Ivan Hlinka Memorial Tournament, scoring one goal in four appearances for Canada junior team.

During his sophomore season with the Terriers, Bowers was selected to participate for Canada at the 2019 World Junior Championships. Chosen for his responsible two-way game, Bowers played as centre on the third line registering two assists in five games before suffering a shock elimination in a 2–1 overtime loss to Finland junior team in the quarterfinals on January 2, 2019, to place sixth.

== Career statistics ==
=== Regular season and playoffs ===
			Regular season					Playoffs
Season	Team	League	GP	G	A	Pts	PIM	GP	G	A	Pts	PIM
2014–15	Halifax McDonald's	NSMMHL	34	23	29	52	24	17	15	18	33	14
2015–16	Waterloo Black Hawks	USHL	56	15	18	33	16	9	0	2	2	0
2016–17	Waterloo Black Hawks	USHL	60	22	29	51	20	6	2	1	3	2
2017–18	Boston University	HE	40	17	15	32	14	—	—	—	—	—
2018–19	Boston University	HE	37	11	10	21	25	—	—	—	—	—
2018–19	Colorado Eagles	AHL	4	0	0	0	2	4	0	1	1	0
2019–20	Colorado Eagles	AHL	48	10	17	27	14	—	—	—	—	—
2020–21	Colorado Eagles	AHL	28	7	2	9	10	—	—	—	—	—
2021–22	Colorado Eagles	AHL	37	6	3	9	12	4	1	3	4	0
2022–23	Colorado Eagles	AHL	37	4	10	14	12	—	—	—	—	—
2022–23	Colorado Avalanche	NHL	1	0	0	0	0	—	—	—	—	—
2022–23	Providence Bruins	AHL	20	4	3	7	4	3	0	0	0	4
2023–24	Utica Comets	AHL	43	10	4	14	8	—	—	—	—	—
2023–24	New Jersey Devils	NHL	8	0	0	0	0	—	—	—	—	—
2024–25	Utica Comets	AHL	65	3	14	17	27	—	—	—	—	—
2024–25	New Jersey Devils	NHL	4	0	0	0	0	—	—	—	—	—
2025–26	San Jose Barracuda	AHL	25	1	4	5	32	—	—	—	—	—
NHL totals			13	0	0	0	0	—	—	—	—	—

=== International ===
Year	Team	Event	Result	GP	G	A	Pts	PIM
2015	Canada Black	U17	8th	5	0	0	0	0
2016	Canada	IH18	5th	4	1	0	1	0
2019	Canada	WJC	6th	5	0	2	2	2
Junior totals				14	1	2	3	2

== Awards and honours ==
Award	Year	Ref
NSMMHL
MVP	2015	
USHL
All-Rookie Second Team	2016	
Third All-Star Team	2017	
College
HE All-Rookie Team	2018	

Awards and achievements
Preceded by Logan Brown	Ottawa Senators first-round draft pick 2017	Succeeded by Brady Tkachuk
