= Fabian Zetterlund =

Swedish ice hockey player (born 1999)

- Born: 25 August 1999 (age 27) Karlstad, Sweden
- Height: 5 ft 11 in (180 cm)
- Weight: 220 lb (100 kg; 15 st 10 lb)
- Position: Winger
- Shoots: Right
- NHL team Former teams: Ottawa Senators; Färjestad BK; New Jersey Devils; San Jose Sharks
- National team: Sweden
- NHL draft: 63rd overall, 2017; New Jersey Devils
- Playing career: 2015–present

Fabian Zetterlund (born 25 August 1999) is a Swedish professional ice hockey player who is a winger for the Ottawa Senators of the National Hockey League (NHL). He was selected by the New Jersey Devils in the third round, 63rd overall, of the 2017 NHL entry draft. He has also played for the San Jose Sharks.

== Playing career ==
=== Sweden ===
Zetterlund played his youth hockey within the program of Färjestad BK. He made his Swedish Hockey League (SHL) debut with the club in the 2015–16 season. In the 2016–17 season, Zetterlund scored 16 goals and 26 points at the J20 Superelit level. In 14 SHL games, in which he averaged less than four minutes played per game, he did not have any points.

Zetterlund earned a more permanent SHL spot in the 2017–18 season, posting three goals and seven points in 35 games, as well as five points in eighn games loaned to Timrå IK of the second-tier Allsvenskan. During the 2018–19 season with Färjestad, Zetterlund suffered an ACL injury, for which he underwent season-ending surgery. In his stunted 16-game season, he had two goals and four points.

=== New Jersey Devils ===
Zetterlund was selected by the New Jersey Devils of the National Hockey League (NHL) in the third round, 63rd overall, of the 2017 NHL entry draft. On 13 May 2019, Zetterlund was signed by the Devils to a three-year, entry-level contract. In his first North American season, the COVID-shortened 2019–20 season, Zetterlund played for the Devils' American Hockey League (AHL) affiliate, the Binghamton Devils, where he scored eight goals and 19 points in 46 games. Although his playing time was limited to start the year as he recovered from the previous season's injury, he worked his way into a larger role and was a consistent scorer by the end of the year.

On 24 October 2020, with North American hockey still paused by the pandemic, the Devils loaned Zetterlund to AIK of the Allsvenskan. In 21 games, he recorded four goals and ten points. He returned to the AHL for the start of its season. In 34 games with Binghamton, he tallied seven goals and 19 points.

In the 2021–22 season, Zetterlund began the season with New Jersey's new AHL affiliate, the Utica Comets, which had moved from Binghamton over the summer. He was recalled by the Devils on 17 November 2021 and made his NHL debut the next day on 18 November against the Florida Panthers. He made three appearances, going scoreless, before being returned to Utica on 27 November. He spent the majority of the season with Utica and in 58 regular season games with Utica, he put up 24 goals and 52 points. He was recalled again on 6 April 2022 with the Devils dealing with a number of injuries to their forwards. Zetterlund scored his first NHL goal in a 6–2 victory over the Arizona Coyotes on 13 April. He made 11 more appearances with the Devils and recorded three goals and eight points. He was returned to Utica for the 2022 AHL playoffs and Zetterlund and the Comets were eliminated in the first round by the Rochester Americans. Zetterlund had two goals and six points in the series, including the opening goal of the decisive game five loss.

In the offseason, Zetterlund was a restricted free agent and re-signed with the team on a one-year contract in August. Entering the 2022–23 season, Zetterlund was named to the Devils' season-opening roster. Early in the season, the Devils were leading the league, with forwards like Zetterlund providing key secondary scoring to supplement the team's superstars. Establishing new offensive highs with the Devils, he collected six goals and 20 points through 45 regular season games.

=== San Jose Sharks ===
Six days prior to the NHL trade deadline, on 26 February 2023, Zetterlund was traded to the San Jose Sharks in a massive nine-player trade that sent Timo Meier to the Devils. He made his Sharks' debut on 28 February in a 3–1 loss to the Montreal Canadiens. He marked his first point in his eighth game with the Sharks, assisting on Kevin Labanc's goal in the third period of a 6–5 overtime loss to the Columbus Blue Jackets on 14 March, in which the Sharks were eliminated from playoff contention. He struggled for the remainder of the season with the rebuilding Sharks, recording only three assists in 22 games. He signed a two-year, $2.9 million contract with the Sharks on 1 July 2023.

Going into his first full season with the rebuilding Sharks in 2023–24, Zetterlund was placed on the top line alongside William Eklund and Mikael Granlund. He tallied his first goal with San Jose on 18 October in a 6–3 loss to the Carolina Hurricanes. He recorded a three-point game twice in March 2024, the first on 5 March, scoring one goal and adding assists on two goals by Anthony Duclair in a 7–6 loss to the Dallas Stars. His second three-point game came on 24 March in which he scored two goals and assisted on another by Thomas Bordeleau in a 5–4 loss to the Chicago Blackhawks. He established new career highs in goals with 24, leading the team in goalscoring, and points with 44 while appearing in all 82 games. With the arrival of highly touted prospects Macklin Celebrini and Will Smith for the 2024–25 season, Zetterlund was placed on the second line alongside Alexander Wennberg. He recorded 17 goals and 36 points in 64 games with San Jose.

=== Ottawa Senators ===
On 7 March 2025, he was traded to the Ottawa Senators alongside Tristen Robins and a 2025 fourth-round pick in exchange for Zack Ostapchuk, Noah Gregor, and a second-round pick in 2025. He made his Senators debut on 10 March against the Detroit Red Wings. He began his time in Ottawa playing on the fourth line alongside Adam Gaudette and Matthew Highmore, before eventually making it to the top line with Tim Stützle. He recorded his first point with the Senators on 27 March, assisting on Thomas Chabot's opening goal in a 4–3 win over the Red Wings. He marked his first goal for Ottawa on 8 April, in a 5–2 loss to the Columbus Blue Jackets. In 20 games with Ottawa, he finished with two goals and five points. The Senators qualified for the playoffs, and faced the Toronto Maple Leafs in the first round. Ottawa was eliminated in six games in their best-of-seven series. Zetterlund went scoreless in the series.

On 19 June 2025, Zetterlund re-signed with the Senators on a three-year contract worth $12.825 million. In 82 games he scored 17 goals and 33 points. The Senators made the playoffs again, but were swept in the first round by the Carolina Hurricanes. Zetterlund went scoreless in the four games.

== International play ==
Medal record

Representing Sweden

Ice hockey

World Championships
Bronze medal – third place	2024 Czech Republic	

World Junior Championships
Silver medal – second place	2018 United States	

Zetterlund has represented Sweden at the Under-17, Under-18, Under-20, and World Championship levels. He represented the country twice at the World Junior Championships. He was invited to join the Swedish junior team for the 2018 World Junior Championships. Sweden advanced to the gold medal game but ultimately finished with the silver medal after losing the match to Canada. He was selected again for the team for the 2019 World Junior Championships as an alternate captain for the Swedish team. However, the team was eliminated in the quarterfinal round by Switzerland.

He represented Sweden at the 2024 IIHF World Championship and won a bronze medal.

== Personal life ==
Zetterlund is a cousin of Andre Lee, a left wing who currently plays for the Ontario Reign.

== Career statistics ==
=== Regular season and playoffs ===
			Regular season					Playoffs
Season	Team	League	GP	G	A	Pts	PIM	GP	G	A	Pts	PIM
2015–16	Färjestad BK	J20	18	0	9	9	16	4	1	0	1	0
2015–16	Färjestad BK	SHL	1	0	0	0	0	—	—	—	—	—
2016–17	Färjestad BK	J20	40	16	20	36	18	2	0	1	1	0
2016–17	Färjestad BK	SHL	14	0	0	0	2	—	—	—	—	—
2017–18	Färjestad BK	J20	5	5	1	6	4	1	0	1	1	0
2017–18	Färjestad BK	SHL	35	3	4	7	6	6	1	1	2	2
2017–18	Timrå IK	Allsv	8	2	3	5	0	—	—	—	—	—
2018–19	Färjestad BK	SHL	16	2	2	4	8	—	—	—	—	—
2019–20	Binghamton Devils	AHL	46	8	11	19	8	—	—	—	—	—
2020–21	AIK	Allsv	21	4	6	10	14	—	—	—	—	—
2020–21	Binghamton Devils	AHL	34	7	12	19	8	—	—	—	—	—
2021–22	Utica Comets	AHL	58	24	28	52	8	5	2	6	8	0
2021–22	New Jersey Devils	NHL	14	3	5	8	0	—	—	—	—	—
2022–23	New Jersey Devils	NHL	45	6	14	20	6	—	—	—	—	—
2022–23	San Jose Sharks	NHL	22	0	3	3	8	—	—	—	—	—
2023–24	San Jose Sharks	NHL	82	24	20	44	33	—	—	—	—	—
2024–25	San Jose Sharks	NHL	64	17	19	36	10	—	—	—	—	—
2024–25	Ottawa Senators	NHL	20	2	3	5	4	6	0	0	0	0
2025–26	Ottawa Senators	NHL	82	17	16	33	16	4	0	0	0	2
SHL totals			66	5	6	11	16	6	1	1	2	2
NHL totals			329	69	80	149	77	10	0	0	0	2

=== International ===
Year	Team	Event	Result	GP	G	A	Pts	PIM
2015	Sweden	U17	3rd place, bronze medalist(s)	6	2	2	4	0
2016	Sweden	IH18	4th	5	1	2	3	27
2017	Sweden	U18	4th	7	3	2	5	0
2018	Sweden	WJC	2nd place, silver medalist(s)	7	2	0	2	4
2019	Sweden	WJC	5th	5	0	0	0	6
2023	Sweden	WC	6th	4	2	1	3	2
2024	Sweden	WC	3rd place, bronze medalist(s)	10	3	1	4	2
Junior totals				30	8	6	14	37
Senior totals				14	5	2	7	4
