= Ukko-Pekka Luukkonen =

Finnish ice hockey player (born 1999)

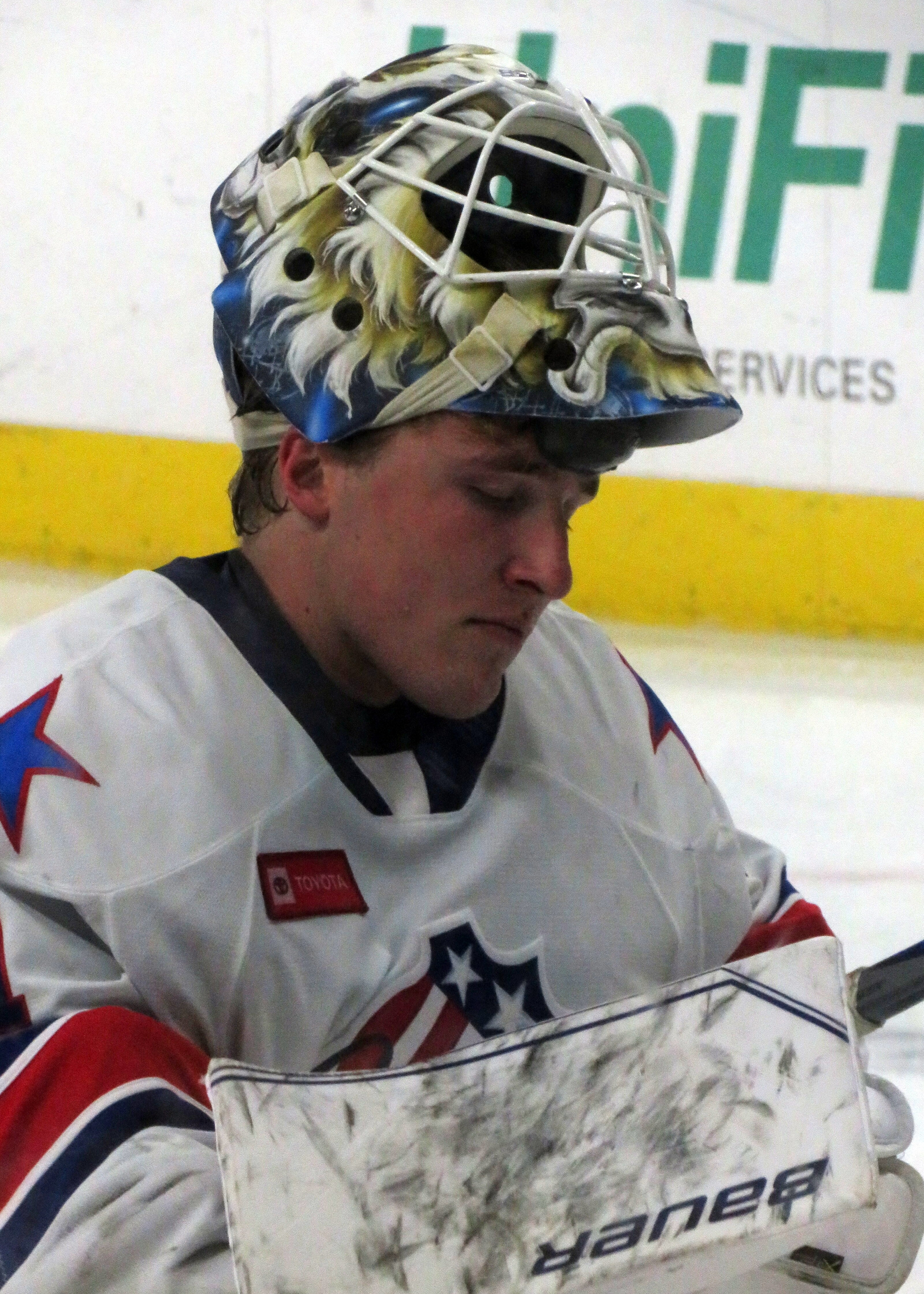
- Luukkonen with the Rochester Americans in 2022
- Born: 9 March 1999 (age 27) Espoo, Finland
- Height: 6 ft 5 in (196 cm)
- Weight: 223 lb (101 kg; 15 st 13 lb)
- Position: Goaltender
- Catches: Left
- NHL team Former teams: Buffalo Sabres; HPK; TPS
- NHL draft: 54th overall, 2017; Buffalo Sabres
- Playing career: 2017–present

Ukko-Pekka Luukkonen (born 9 March 1999), known colloquially as UPL, is a Finnish professional ice hockey player who is a goaltender for the Buffalo Sabres of the National Hockey League (NHL). He was selected in the second round, 54th overall, by the Sabres in the 2017 NHL entry draft.

== Early life ==
Luukkonen was born in Espoo and he grew up in Hyvinkää. Luukkonen's father, Jari, is the Secretary General at the World Wildlife Fund-Finland. Luukkonen was named after former Finnish president Pehr Evind Svinhufvud's nickname. As a child, Luukkonen played football, floorball, and flute. He also played for the Hyvinkään Jää-Ahmat junior squad. Luukkonen grew up idolizing Finnish goaltenders Miikka Kiprusoff and Tuukka Rask. Luukkonen has a twin brother, Jaakko, who played football before becoming an engineer. Luukkonen's older brother, Nuutti, was also a goaltender at the junior level, and went on to become a pilot.

== Playing career ==
=== Junior ===
Luukkonen has formerly played for HPK of Liiga, as well as HPK's under-16, under-18, and under-20 teams, and for LeKi of Mestis on loan. After playing for HPK's under-20 team, he was drafted by the Buffalo Sabres, 54th overall, in the 2017 NHL entry draft. He has also been drafted in the 2016 KHL Junior Draft by Severstal Cherepovets of the Kontinental Hockey League (KHL) with the 122nd overall pick.

On 15 June 2018, Luukkonen agreed to a three-year, entry-level contract with the Sabres. Luukkonen was selected third overall by the Sudbury Wolves in the 2018 CHL Import Draft.

In the 2018–19 season, his first in North America playing major junior ice hockey, Luukkonen set the Sudbury Wolves franchise record for most wins in a regular season, and led the Ontario Hockey League (OHL) in wins, save percentage, and shutouts. Luukkonen was the first European import player to win the Red Tilson Trophy as the league's most outstanding player. Rob Papineau, the Wolves' general manager, said that Luukkonen told him he played much better once he felt like the Wolves were "[his] team. I'm the starter. This is my team". Luukkonen later said his time in Sudbury was "one of the best years of my hockey career" and "a special time for me", and he would later present Quentin Musty with a Wolves jersey when the latter was selected first overall in the 2021 OHL draft.

=== Professional ===
On 12 April 2019, Luukkonen signed an amateur tryout contract with the Sabres' American Hockey League (AHL) affiliate, the Rochester Americans. On 14 April, Luukkonen made his debut with Rochester, earning a victory in a 4–2 win over the Belleville Senators. Following the conclusion of the 2018–19 season, Luukkonen underwent successful hip surgery.

Following his return from hip surgery, Luukkonen spent the majority of the 2019–20 season with the Cincinnati Cyclones of the ECHL to return to form. Luukkonen played successfully with the Cyclones, being named ECHL Goaltender of the Month for November 2019, and represented the team at the ECHL All-Star Game.

On 18 August 2020, Luukkonen agreed to return to the Finnish Liiga on loan from the Sabres with TPS for a period of four-to-six weeks due to the delayed 2020–21 North American season. He played 13 games with TPS between October 2020 and January 2021 before returning to North America. On 23 April 2021, Luukkonen made his NHL debut and recorded his first NHL win in a 6–4 win over the Boston Bruins. Luukkonen played four games for the Sabres in 2021.

Luukkonen spent most of the 2021–22 season with the Americans, but he was one of six goaltenders to play for the Sabres in the 2021–22 season. He played well in limited ice time, but suffered an injury against the Boston Bruins.

Luukkonen began the 2022–23 season with the Americans to ensure he could get ice time, before being called up due to an injury to Eric Comrie. During a road trip in December 2023, Luukkonen had "two stellar showings out west...he was decisive and showed off his athletic ability", including a 41-save performance against the Vegas Golden Knights where Tage Thompson said Luukkonen "won the game for us. He stood on his head all night." In January 2023, Luukkonen was named NHL Rookie of the Month with six wins in nine starts and a .907 save percentage for the month. Luukkonen remained with the Sabres even after Comrie's return from injury, becoming part of a difficult three goaltender rotation with Comrie and veteran Craig Anderson. The Sabres' defence struggled for most of the season, and by the time the defence began to improve at the end of the season, Luukkonen was the fourth goaltender behind the newly arrived rookie Devon Levi.

After the season, Luukkonen had surgery on his ankle. During the off-season in the spring of 2023, Sabres general manager Kevyn Adams invited Luukkonen to his house to have dinner and watch the Stanley Cup playoffs. During the dinner, Adams discussed Luukkonen's progress, and expressed confidence in Luukkonen's future with the team. During the 2023 off-season, Luukkonen worked on his technique, including work on his stance and positioning – focusing on being less aggressive and sliding around less in the crease – as well as working with a mental coach.

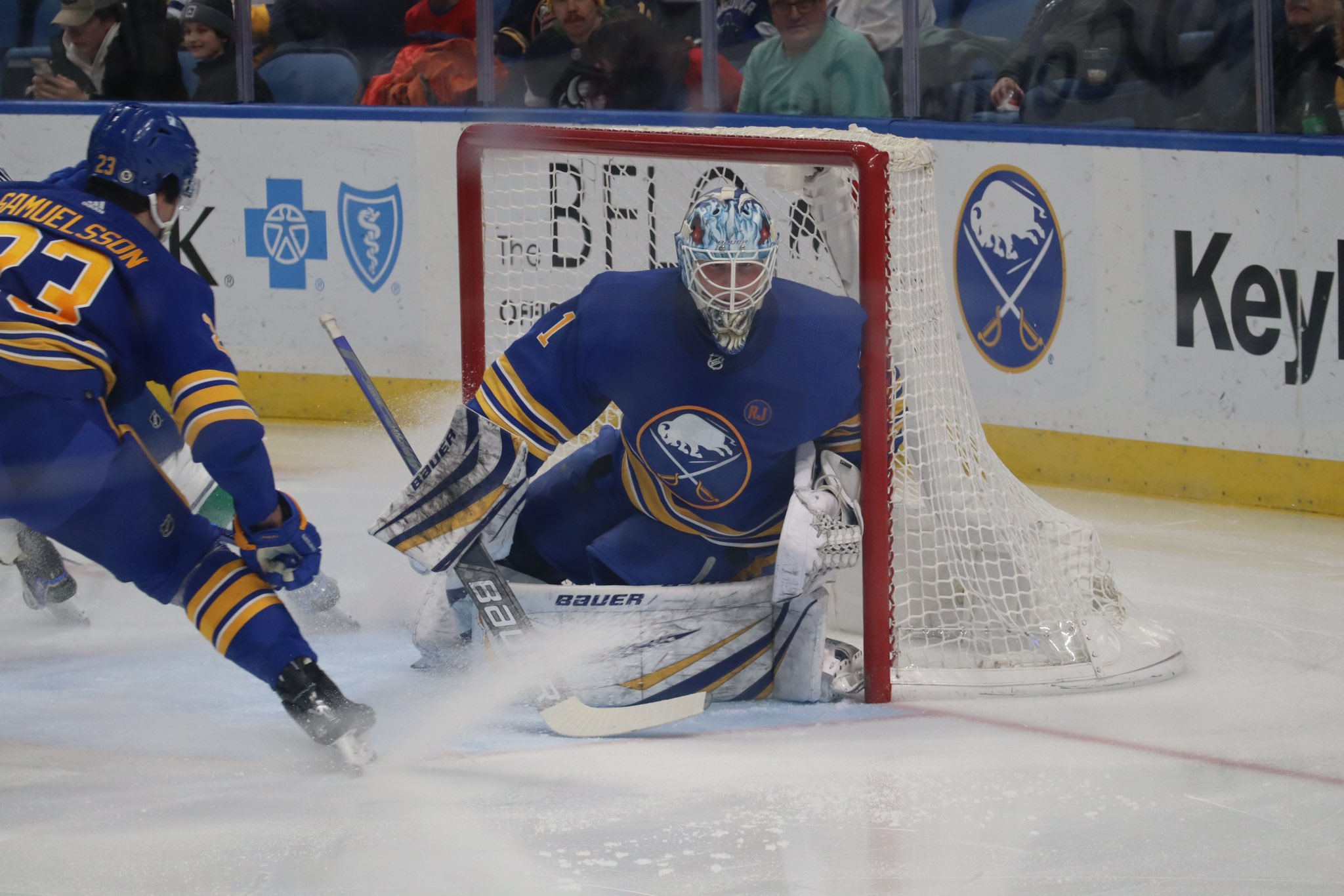
Luukkonen and Mattias Samuelsson during a game against the Vancouver Canucks on 13 January 2024

Luukkonen started the 2023–24 season as the third goaltender on the Sabres roster, behind Comrie and Levi. Levi started the first four games of the season for the Sabres, but suffered a lower-body injury after the final start in that run. Luukkonen's first start of the season came on the second half of a back-to-back series on 24 October 2023, a 6–4 win against the Ottawa Senators. His next ice time would come in relief in the next game after Comrie was injured against the New Jersey Devils. Luukkonen started five out of the next seven games, with three wins, including his first NHL shutout in a 4–0 win over the Colorado Avalanche on 29 October. Luukkonen missed three games in December due to an illness severe enough to cause him to lose weight, and struggled on his return, losing his next three starts. However, Luukkonen entered the new year on a hot streak, including two consecutive shutouts on 15 and 18 January 2024, against the San Jose Sharks and Chicago Blackhawks, becoming the first Sabres goaltender to accomplish that feat since Carter Hutton in 2019. Luukkonen recorded a 33-save shutout against the Los Angeles Kings on 13 February, becoming the first Sabres goaltender since Ryan Miller in 2011–12 to record four or more shutouts in one season. He led the league in save percentage and goals against average from 1 January until 15 February, where he missed a game due to a lower-body injury. On 25 February, in a 3–2 shootout victory against the Carolina Hurricanes, Luukkonen would become the first Sabres goaltender since Jhonas Enroth to make four saves and allow no goals in a shootout. Luukkonen notched a fifth shutout on 14 March, against the New York Islanders. He was considered "arguably the best goalie in the league for the last while" by teammates and media. Luukkonen was nominated by the Professional Hockey Writers' Association (PHWA) for the 2024 Bill Masterton Memorial Trophy. Luukkonen's breakout season was widely considered to be a bright spot in an otherwise disappointing Sabres season, in which the Sabres' playoff drought hit an NHL-longest 13 seasons. Luukkonen ascribed his improvement to a positive mindset as well as the positivity of fellow goaltender Comrie, while former Sabres coach Don Granato credited Luukkonen's work with Anderson as well as competing with Levi.

Luukkonen received two third-place All-Star votes from the PWHA, but was not selected to the NHL All-Star team. After the season, Luukkonen filed for salary arbitration, however prior to the hearing, he and the Sabres agreed to terms on a five-year, $23.75 million contract extension, including a five-team no trade clause after two years.

== International play ==
Medal record

Representing Finland

Ice hockey

World Junior Championships
| Gold medal – first place | 2019 Canada | |

World U18 Championships
| Gold medal – first place | 2016 USA | |
| Silver medal – second place | 2017 Slovakia | |

Luukkonen played for Finland national teams in the under-18 and junior world championships. He was first selected as the third goaltender for the 2016 World U18 Championships, and although he was such a late selection that team items were not customized with his name, he would step in as starter when Leevi Laakso got sick and led the team to a gold medal. Luukkonen would lead Finland to the silver medal in the 2017 World U18 Championships. He won the gold again at the 2019 World Junior Championships in a 3–2 victory over the United States junior team and was named the media's pick for best goaltender of the tournament.

== Personal life ==
Luukkonen's favorite goaltender is Pekka Rinne, and his 2023–24 "Buffalo Rage" mask was designed after Rinne's.

== Career statistics ==
=== Regular season and playoffs ===
| | | | Regular season | | | | | | | | | Playoffs |
| Season | Team | League | GP | W | L | OTL | MIN | GA | SO | GAA | SV% | GP | W | L | MIN | GA | SO | GAA | SV% |
|---|---|---|---|---|---|---|---|---|---|---|---|---|---|---|---|---|---|---|---|
| 2015–16 | HPK | Jr. A | 15 | — | — | — | — | — | — | 1.98 | .924 | 8 | — | — | — | — | — | 1.94 | .920 |
| 2016–17 | HPK | Jr. A | 35 | — | — | — | — | — | — | 1.78 | .917 | 9 | — | — | — | — | — | 2.01 | .915 |
| 2017–18 | HPK | Jr. A | 2 | — | — | — | — | — | — | 2.50 | .924 | — | — | — | — | — | — | — | — |
| 2017–18 | LeKi | Mestis | 24 | — | — | — | — | 70 | — | 2.92 | .908 | — | — | — | — | — | — | — | — |
| 2017–18 | HPK | Liiga | 1 | 0 | 1 | 0 | 34 | 2 | 0 | 3.55 | .750 | — | — | — | — | — | — | — | — |
| 2018–19 | Sudbury Wolves | OHL | 53 | 38 | 11 | 2 | 3,078 | 128 | 6 | 2.50 | .920 | 8 | 4 | 3 | 514 | 28 | 0 | 3.27 | .906 |
| 2018–19 | Rochester Americans | AHL | 1 | 1 | 0 | 0 | 60 | 2 | 0 | 2.00 | .941 | — | — | — | — | — | — | — | — |
| 2019–20 | Cincinnati Cyclones | ECHL | 23 | 12 | 7 | 3 | 1,338 | 50 | 3 | 2.24 | .912 | — | — | — | — | — | — | — | — |
| 2019–20 | Rochester Americans | AHL | 10 | 3 | 4 | 3 | 610 | 32 | 0 | 3.15 | .874 | — | — | — | — | — | — | — | — |
| 2020–21 | TPS | Liiga | 13 | 6 | 3 | 4 | 787 | 33 | 1 | 2.52 | .908 | — | — | — | — | — | — | — | — |
| 2020–21 | Rochester Americans | AHL | 14 | 7 | 5 | 2 | 817 | 49 | 0 | 3.60 | .888 | — | — | — | — | — | — | — | — |
| 2020–21 | Buffalo Sabres | NHL | 4 | 1 | 3 | 0 | 217 | 14 | 0 | 3.88 | .906 | — | — | — | — | — | — | — | — |
| 2021–22 | Rochester Americans | AHL | 35 | 15 | 14 | 6 | 2,032 | 111 | 1 | 3.28 | .900 | — | — | — | — | — | — | — | — |
| 2021–22 | Buffalo Sabres | NHL | 9 | 2 | 5 | 2 | 504 | 23 | 0 | 2.74 | .917 | — | — | — | — | — | — | — | — |
| 2022–23 | Rochester Americans | AHL | 9 | 6 | 3 | 0 | 527 | 27 | 0 | 3.07 | .898 | — | — | — | — | — | — | — | — |
| 2022–23 | Buffalo Sabres | NHL | 33 | 17 | 11 | 4 | 1,911 | 115 | 0 | 3.61 | .892 | — | — | — | — | — | — | — | — |
| 2023–24 | Buffalo Sabres | NHL | 54 | 27 | 22 | 4 | 3,081 | 132 | 5 | 2.57 | .910 | — | — | — | — | — | — | — | — |
| 2024–25 | Buffalo Sabres | NHL | 55 | 24 | 24 | 5 | 3,172 | 169 | 2 | 3.20 | .887 | — | — | — | — | — | — | — | — |
| 2025–26 | Rochester Americans | AHL | 1 | 1 | 0 | 0 | 60 | 2 | 0 | 2.01 | .913 | — | — | — | — | — | — | — | — |
| 2025–26 | Buffalo Sabres | NHL | 35 | 22 | 9 | 3 | 2,028 | 85 | 1 | 2.52 | .910 | 6 | 3 | 3 | 321 | 17 | 0 | 3.18 | .876 |
| Liiga totals | | | 14 | 6 | 4 | 4 | 821 | 35 | 1 | 2.56 | .905 | — | — | — | — | — | — | — | — |
| NHL totals | | | 190 | 93 | 74 | 18 | 10,911 | 538 | 8 | 2.96 | .900 | 6 | 3 | 3 | 321 | 17 | 0 | 3.18 | .876 |

=== International ===
| Year | Team | Event | Result | GP | W | L | T | MIN | GA | SO | GAA | SV% |
|---|---|---|---|---|---|---|---|---|---|---|---|---|
| 2015 | Finland | U17 | 5th | 1 | 0 | 1 | 0 | 60 | 3 | 0 | 3.00 | .903 |
| 2016 | Finland | U18 | 1st place, gold medalist(s) | 3 | 3 | 0 | 0 | 180 | 6 | 0 | 2.00 | .917 |
| 2016 | Finland | IH18 | 6th | 2 | 0 | 2 | 0 | 118 | 9 | 0 | 4.58 | .850 |
| 2017 | Finland | U18 | 2nd place, silver medalist(s) | 6 | 5 | 1 | 0 | 373 | 18 | 0 | 2.90 | .899 |
| 2018 | Finland | WJC | 6th | 5 | 2 | 2 | 1 | 307 | 16 | 0 | 3.13 | .879 |
| 2019 | Finland | WJC | 1st place, gold medalist(s) | 6 | 4 | 2 | 0 | 367 | 11 | 0 | 1.80 | .932 |
| Junior totals | | | | 23 | 14 | 8 | 1 | 1,405 | 63 | 0 | 2.69 | — |

== Awards and honours ==
| Award | Year | Ref |
Jr. A
| Champion | 2017 | |
OHL
| OHL First All-Star Team | 2019 | |
| Goaltender of the Year | 2019 | |
| Red Tilson Trophy | 2019 | |
ECHL
| All-Star Game | 2020 | |
