= Aleksi Anttalainen =

Finnish ice hockey defenceman

- Born: March 28, 1999 (age 27) Turku, Finland
- Height: 5 ft 9 in (175 cm)
- Weight: 201 lb (91 kg; 14 st 5 lb)
- Position: Defence
- Shoots: Left
- Liiga team Former teams: HC Ässät Pori; HC TPS; SaiPa
- Playing career: 2019–present

Aleksi Anttalainen (born March 28, 1999) is a Finnish professional ice hockey defenceman currently playing for HC Ässät of the Finnish Liiga.

== Career ==
=== Junior ===
Anttalainen began playing ice hockey at Kiekko-67 in 2004 at the age of five. He played in TuTo juniors before moving to HC TPS in 2012. In the 2013–14 season he played 22 games with HC TPS U16 scoring 22 points. The following season he joined TPS U18 where he played 33 games and scored 18 points while also making his first international junior appearances at the U16 and U17 levels.

Anttalainen was promoted to the HC TPS U20 team for the 2015–16 season where he scored eight points in 31 games. Anttalainen represented TPS at the Junior Club World Cup. The following season he scored 13 points in 42 games and represented Finland in the World U18 Championship and the Ivan Hlinka Memorial Tournament.

Anttalainen moved to the QMJHL club Blainville-Boisbriand Armada where he played 61 regular season games scoring 22 points and 22 playoff games with seven points. He joined the Montreal Canadiens rookie camp in 2018 but was returned to his junior club. The following season Anttalainen scored 11 points in 31 games as Armada's assistant captain before being traded to the Moncton Wildcats in the same league. He played 23 games scoring 11 points with the Wildcats.

=== Professional ===
For the 2019–20 season he returned to his youth club HC TPS on a two-year contract and made his professional Liiga debut on 14 September 2019. Anttalainen won silver with the club in 2021 and 2022. For the 2023–24 season Anttalainen moved to SaiPa where he scored two points in 20 games before being loaned to TuTo in the Mestis for the rest of the season.

In the following season Anttalainen was signed by HC Ässät Pori in the Liiga. He played 57 games scoring seven points and made a one-year contract extension with the club. In January 2026 his two-year extension until 2028 with HC Ässät was announced.
