= 2016 Ivan Hlinka Memorial Tournament =

Tournament details
- Host countries: Slovakia; Czech Republic
- Venue(s): 2 (in 2 host cities)
- Dates: 8–13 August 2016
- Teams: 8

Final positions
- Champions: Czech Republic
- Runner-up: United States
- Third place: Russia
- Fourth place: Sweden

Tournament statistics
- Games played: 18
- Goals scored: 117 (6.5 per game)
- Scoring leader(s): (United States) Sasha Chmelevski (5 goals, 5 assists)

Official website
- hlinkamemorial.com

The 2016 Ivan Hlinka Memorial Tournament was an under-18 international ice hockey tournament held in Břeclav, Czech Republic and Bratislava, Slovakia from 8 to 13 August 2016.

== Preliminary round ==
All times are Central European Summer Time (UTC+2).

=== Group A ===
Pos	Team	Pld	W	OTW	OTL	L	GF	GA	GD	Pts	Qualification
1	United States	3	2	1	0	0	12	8	+4	8	Semifinals
2	Czech Republic	3	2	0	0	1	13	8	+5	6	Semifinals
3	Finland	3	1	0	1	1	10	12	−2	4	Fifth place game
4	Switzerland	3	0	0	0	3	7	14	−7	0	Seventh place game

8 August 2016; 15:30	United States	4–3 OT (1–1, 1–0, 1–2); OT (1–0)	Finland	Ice BORS Arena, Břeclav; Attendance: 239

Game reference

Keith Petruzzelli
Goalies
Lassi Lehtinen
Referees:
(Czech Republic) Robert Čech
(Czech Republic) Oldřich Hejduk
Linesmen:
(Czech Republic) Jiří Gebauer
(Czech Republic) Vít Lederer

Lodina (Chmelevski, Pastujov) – 15:31	1–0
	1–1	18:52 – Teräväinen (Virtanen, Koskenkorva) (PP)
Chmelevski (Lodina, McManus) (PP) – 30:37	2–1
	2–2	42:54 – Moilanen (Nyman) (PP)
Pastujov – 51:09	3–2
	3–3	57:48 –Teräväinen (Vesterinen) (PP)
Poehling (Miller) – 64:36	4–3

12 min
Penalties
4 min
37
Shots
25

8 August 2016; 19:00	Czech Republic	6–1 (4–1, 1–0, 1–0)	Switzerland	Ice BORS Arena, Břeclav; Attendance: 1,522

Game reference

Jakub Škarek
Goalies
Gianluca Zaetta
Referees:
(Czech Republic) Robert Čech
(Czech Republic) Jan Hribik
Linesmen:
(Czech Republic) Jiří Ondráček
(Czech Republic) Roman Svoboda

	0–1	01:19 – Sigrist (Müller)
Svoboda (Šalda) – 08:32	1–1
Zadina (Galvas) (PP) – 14:51	2–1
Svoboda (Nečas, Kvasnička) (PP2) – 17:27	3–1
Safin (Machala, Galvas) – 18:24	4–1
Nečas (Kaut) – 23:07	5–1
Chytil – 43:45	6–1

6 min
Penalties
37 min
39
Shots
16

9 August 2016; 15:30	Switzerland	3–4 (2–2, 1–1, 0–1)	United States	Ice BORS Arena, Břeclav; Attendance: 296

Game reference

Joel Messerli
Goalies
Cayden Primeau
Referees:
(Czech Republic) Jan Hribik
(Czech Republic) Robin Šír
Linesmen:
(Czech Republic) Jiří Ondráček
(Czech Republic) Roman Svoboda

Tanner (Müller) – 07:22	1–0
Eggenberger (Leuenberger) – 08:08	2–0
	2–1	08:52 – Pastujov (Chmelevski)
	2–2	18:24 – Chmelevski (Pratt, Pastujov)
Leuenberger (Döpfner) – 31:20	3–2
	3–3	37:49 – Messner
	3–4	52:34 – Chmelevski (PP)

2 min
Penalties
6 min
21
Shots
39

9 August 2016; 19:00	Czech Republic	5–3 (1–1, 2–1, 2–1)	Finland	Ice BORS Arena, Břeclav; Attendance: 1,794

Game reference

Jakub Škarek
Goalies
Ukko-Pekka Luukkonen
Referees:
(Czech Republic) Daniel Pražák
(Czech Republic) Vladimír Pešina
Linesmen:
(Czech Republic) Radek Brejcha
(Czech Republic) Libor Suchánek

Safin (Nečas, Kaut) – 14:30	1–0
	1–1	15:03 – Moilanen (Nyman)
	1–2	24:11 – Moilanen (Heponiemi, Talvitie) (PP)
Zadina (Kern, Hladoník) – 29:11	2–2
Galvas (Machala, Kondelík) – 30:34	3–2
Kaut (Chytil, Kern) – 41:02	4–2
	4–3	54:51 – Anttalainen (Nyman) (SH)
Nečas (Zadina) (ENG) – 59:59	5–3

8 min
Penalties
16 min
34
Shots
30

10 August 2016; 15:30	Finland	4–3 (0–1, 2–0, 2–2)	Switzerland	Ice BORS Arena, Břeclav; Attendance: 284

Game reference

Lassi Lehtinen
Goalies
Gianluca Zaetta
Referees:
(Czech Republic) Vladimír Pešina
(Czech Republic) Daniel Pražák
Linesmen:
(Czech Republic) Radek Brejcha
(Czech Republic) Libor Suchánek

	0–1	07:48 – Reymondin (Zbinden, Kobler)
Anttalainen – 23:16	1–1
Nyman (Moilanen, Heponiemi) – 30:42	2–1
	2–2	40:05 – Müller (Hischier) (PP)
Pajuniemi (Engberg) – 44:33	3–2
Nyman (Heponiemi, Moilanen) – 45:55	4–2
	4–3	50:59 – Hischier (Eggenberger, Geisser) (PP2)

34 min
Penalties
14 min
24
Shots
24

10 August 2016; 19:00	Czech Republic	2–4 (1–1, 1–3, 0–0)	United States	Ice BORS Arena, Břeclav; Attendance: 2,103

Game reference

Tomáš Vomáčka
Goalies
Cayden Primeau
Referees:
(Czech Republic) Oldřich Hejduk
(Czech Republic) René Hradil
Linesmen:
(Czech Republic) Rudolf Tošenovjan
(Czech Republic) Marek Hlavatý

	0–1	08:50 – Lodina (Chmelevski) (PP)
Chytil (Safin, Bukač) – 11:12	1–1
	1–2	28:47 – Poehling (Pastujov)
Safin (Nečas, Kaut) (PP) – 34:38	2–2
	2–3	38:46 – Poehling (Chmelevski, Pastujov) (PP)
	2–4	39:49 – Poehling (Pastujov)

12 min
Penalties
14 min
25
Shots
42

=== Group B ===
Pos	Team	Pld	W	OTW	OTL	L	GF	GA	GD	Pts	Qualification
1	Sweden	3	2	0	0	1	10	8	+2	6	Semifinals
2	Russia	3	2	0	0	1	8	6	+2	6	Semifinals
3	Canada	3	1	1	0	1	8	5	+3	5	Fifth place game
4	Slovakia	3	0	0	1	2	7	14	−7	1	Seventh place game

8 August 2016; 14:00	Sweden	3–1 (1–0, 1–0, 1–1)	Russia	Ondrej Nepela Arena, Bratislava; Attendance: 512

Game reference

Olle Eriksson Ek
Goalies
Dmitri Raiko
Referees:
(Slovakia) Vladimír Goga
(Slovakia) Jozef Kubuš
Linesmen:
(Slovakia) Roman Výleta
(Slovakia) Peter Tvrdoň

Zetterlund (Miketinac, Björkman) – 14:00	1–0
Sylvegård (Hedberg) (PP) – 32:03	2–0
	2–1	44:33 – Anokhovsky (Rubinchik, Muranov)
Hugg (Elvenes, Liljegren) – 47:12	3–1

6 min
Penalties
6 min
28
Shots
35

8 August 2016; 17:30	Slovakia	2–3 OT (0–2, 0–0, 2–0); OT (0–1)	Canada	Ondrej Nepela Arena, Bratislava; Attendance: 1,479

Game reference

Juraj Sklenár
Goalies
Ian Scott
Referees:
(Slovakia) Juraj Konc
(Slovakia) Róbert Müllner
Linesmen:
(Slovakia) Michal Orolín
(Slovakia) Lukáš Kacej

	0–1	01:09 – Tippett (Rasmussen, Veleno)
	0–2	06:25 – Comtois (Suzuki, Entwistle)
Ivan (Krivošík, Roman) (PP) – 50:52	1–2
Krivošík (Ivan) (EA) – 58:58	2–2
	2–3	64:32 – Comtois

2 min
Penalties
6 min
23
Shots
43

9 August 2016; 11:30	Slovakia	3–6 (0–1, 1–4, 2–1)	Sweden	Ondrej Nepela Arena, Bratislava; Attendance: 979

Game reference

Juraj Ovečka
Juraj Sklenár
Goalies
Arvid Söderblom
Referees:
(Slovakia) Vladimír Goga
(Slovakia) Milan Novák
Linesmen:
(Slovakia) Lukáš Kacej
(Slovakia) Matúš Stanzel

	0–1	15:23 – Brännström (Walfridsson)
Krivošík (Roman) (PP) – 20:31	1–1
	1–2	26:03 – Liljegren (Elvenes) (PP)
	1–3	28:29 – Elvenes (Lundeström)
	1–4	28:50 – Johansson (Walfridsson, Sylvegård)
	1–5	37:30 – Miketinac (Liljegren)
Hrehorčák (Liška) – 41:00	2–5
	2–6	44:45 –Wernblom (Miketinac, Dahlin)
Havrila (Žiak, Liška) (PP) – 55:13	3–6

8 min
Penalties
24 min
33
Shots
27

9 August 2016; 15:00	Russia	2–1 (0–0, 0–1, 2–0)	Canada	Ondrej Nepela Arena, Bratislava; Attendance: 764

Game reference

Artyom Melnikov
Goalies
Michael DiPietro
Referees:
(Slovakia) Juraj Konc
(Slovakia) Daniel Konc
Linesmen:
(Slovakia) Peter Tvrdoň
(Slovakia) Roman Výleta

	0–1	21:18 – Mattheos (Rasmussen, Crête-Belzile)
Chekhovich (Rubinchik, Lipanov) (PP) – 58:16	1–1
Kostin (Y.Alexeyev, Bitsadze) – 58:52	2–1

12 min
Penalties
14 min
26
Shots
43

10 August 2016; 14:00	Canada	4–1 (3–1, 0–0, 1–0)	Sweden	Ondrej Nepela Arena, Bratislava; Attendance: 645

Game reference

Michael DiPietro
Goalies
Olle Eriksson Ek
Referees:
(Slovakia) Daniel Konc
(Slovakia) Milan Novák
Linesmen:
(Slovakia) Lukáš Kacej
(Slovakia) Peter Tvrdoň

Bowers (Roberts) – 05:35	1–0
	1–1	16:35 – Brännström (Zetterlund) (PP2)
Comtois (SH) – 18:05	2–1
Comtois (SH2) – 19:09	3–1
Strome (Rasmussen, Phillips) (PP) – 44:07	4–1

16 min
Penalties
12 min
31
Shots
23

10 August 2016; 17:30	Slovakia	2–5 (0–0, 1–1, 1–4)	Russia	Ondrej Nepela Arena, Bratislava; Attendance: 1,524

Game reference

Juraj Sklenár
Goalies
Artyom Melnikov
Referees:
(Slovakia) Vladimír Baluška
(Slovakia) Peter Stano
Linesmen:
(Slovakia) Matúš Stanzel
(Slovakia) Roman Výleta

	0–1	21:47 – Galenyuk (Rubinchik, Kostin) (PP)
Köver – 36:49	1–1
	1–2	44:01 – Svechnikov (Chekhovich, Lipanov)
	1–3	51:37 – Svechnikov (Chekhovich, Lipanov)
Krivošík (Roman) – 57:19	2–3
	2–4	58:47 – Kostin (Y.Alexeyev, Bitsadze)
	2–5	59:59 – Y.Alexeyev (Kostin) (ENG)

8 min
Penalties
14 min
30
Shots
34

== Final round ==
=== Seventh place game ===
12 August 2016; 14:00	Slovakia	6–3 (1–2, 3–1, 2–0)	Switzerland	Ondrej Nepela Arena, Bratislava; Attendance: 745

Game reference

Juraj Sklenár
Goalies
Joakim Da Silva
Referees:
(Slovakia) Vladimír Baluška
(Slovakia) Milan Novák
Linesmen:
(Slovakia) Michal Orolín
(Slovakia) Lukáš Kacej

Ružička (Liška) – 03:52	1–0
	1–1	04:57 – Nyffeler (Müller, Reymondin)
	1–2	09:00 – Gross (Döpfner)
Hrehorčák (Roman, Köver) – 20:52	2–2
	2–3	21:02 – Sigrist (Müller)
Krivošík (Ružička, Ivan) – 24:00	3–3
Liška (Roman) (SH) – 28:30	4–3
Köver (Ružička) – 40:05	5–3
Ružička (Žiak) (ENG) – 57:39	6–3

6 min
Penalties
8 min
35
Shots
30

=== Fifth place game ===
12 August 2016; 15:30	Canada	4–3 (1–1, 2–1, 1–1)	Finland	Ice BORS Arena, Břeclav; Attendance: 425

Game reference

Michael DiPietro
Goalies
Ukko-Pekka Luukkonen
Referees:
(Czech Republic) René Hradil
(Czech Republic) Roman Mrkva
Linesmen:
(Czech Republic) Marek Hlavatý
(Czech Republic) Rudolf Tošenovjan

	0–1	05:04 – Moilanen (Nyman, Räsänen) (PP2)
Mitchell (Veleno, Smart) – 19:36	1–1
Mitchell (Veleno, Comtois) (PP) – 22:44	2–1
Suzuki (Veleno, Mitchell) (PP) – 29:26	3–1
	3–2	35:02 – Nyman (Heponiemi, Vaakanainen)
	3–3	45:52 – Virtanen (Heponiemi, Teräväinen) (PP)
Rasmussen (Tippett, Suzuki) (PP2) – 51:24	4–3

8 min
Penalties
12 min
26
Shots
26

=== Semifinals ===
12 August 2016; 17:30	United States	4–3 OT (0–0, 2–2, 1–1); OT (1–0)	Russia	Ondrej Nepela Arena, Bratislava; Attendance: 328

Game reference

Cayden Primeau
Goalies
Dmitri Raiko
Referees:
(Slovakia) Juraj Konc
(Slovakia) Daniel Konc
Linesmen:
(Slovakia) Peter Tvrdoň
(Slovakia) Roman Výleta

	0–1	20:59 – Kostin (Y.Alexeyev)
Messner (Poehling, Pastujov) – 22:30	1–1
	1–2	36:42 – Lyakhov (SH)
Lodina (Poehling, Chmelevski) (PP) – 38:47	2–2
	2–3	41:44 – Bitsadze (Kostin)
Chmelevski (Phillips) (PP) – 51:30	3–3
Pastujov – 65:15	4–3

20 min
Penalties
8 min
37
Shots
32

12 August 2016; 19:00	Sweden	1–2 OT (0–0, 1–1, 0–0); OT (0–1)	Czech Republic	Ice BORS Arena, Břeclav; Attendance: 1,962

Game reference

Olle Eriksson Ek
Goalies
Jakub Škarek
Referees:
(Czech Republic) Robert Čech
(Czech Republic) Jan Hribik
Linesmen:
(Czech Republic) Jiří Gebauer
(Czech Republic) Josef Špůr

	0–1	23:53 – Zadina (Nečas)
Dahlin (Bemström) – 30:29	1–1
	1–2	69:38 – Galvas (Zadina)

35 min
Penalties
4 min
42
Shots
36

=== Bronze medal game ===
13 August 2016; 15:00	Sweden	3–6 (0–4, 2–1, 1–1)	Russia	Ondrej Nepela Arena, Bratislava; Attendance: 412

Game reference

Olle Eriksson Ek
Arvid Söderblom
Goalies
Dmitri Raiko
Referees:
(Slovakia) Jozef Kubuš
(Slovakia) Juraj Konc
Linesmen:
(Slovakia) Roman Výleta
(Slovakia) Matúš Stanzel

	0–1	03:50 – Svechnikov (Lipanov)
	0–2	05:23 – Chekhovich (Svechnikov, Baranov) (PP)
	0–3	10:53 – Lobanov (Shashkov, Marushev)
	0–4	14:50 – Svechnikov (Lipanov, Samorukov)
	0–5	25:56 – Marushev (Samorukov, Lobanov)
Aterius (Sylvegård) – 27:53	1–5
Bemström (Zetterlund, Brännström) – 38:10	2–5
	2–6	47:31 – Kostin (Bitsadze, Y.Alexeyev)
Hugg (Lundeström, Liljegren) (PP) – 53:41	3–6

60 min
Penalties
64 min
23
Shots
36

=== Gold medal game ===
13 August 2016; 17:30	United States	3–4 (1–1, 2–2, 0–1)	Czech Republic	Ice BORS Arena, Břeclav; Attendance: 2,325

Game reference

Cayden Primeau
Goalies
Jakub Škarek
Referees:
(Czech Republic) Jan Hribik
(Czech Republic) Antonín Jeřábek
Linesmen:
(Czech Republic) Jiří Gebauer
(Czech Republic) Josef Špůr

	0–1	09:14 – Zadina (Hladoník, Kern)
Chmelevski (Phillips) (PP) – 17:09	1–1
Messner (Walsh, Poehling) – 21:08	2–1
	2–2	30:34 – Chytil (Kvasnička)
Miller (Messner) – 31:01	3–2
	3–3	35:41 – Zadina (Kern, Hladoník)
	3–4	52:23 – Machala (Galvas) (PP)

31 min
Penalties
2 min
26
Shots
33

== Final standings ==
Rk.	Team
1st place, gold medalist(s)	Czech Republic
2nd place, silver medalist(s)	United States
3rd place, bronze medalist(s)	Russia
4.	Sweden
5.	Canada
6.	Finland
7.	Slovakia
8.	Switzerland

== See also ==
- 2016 IIHF World U18 Championships
- 2016 World Junior Championships
