= Reilly Walsh =

American ice hockey player

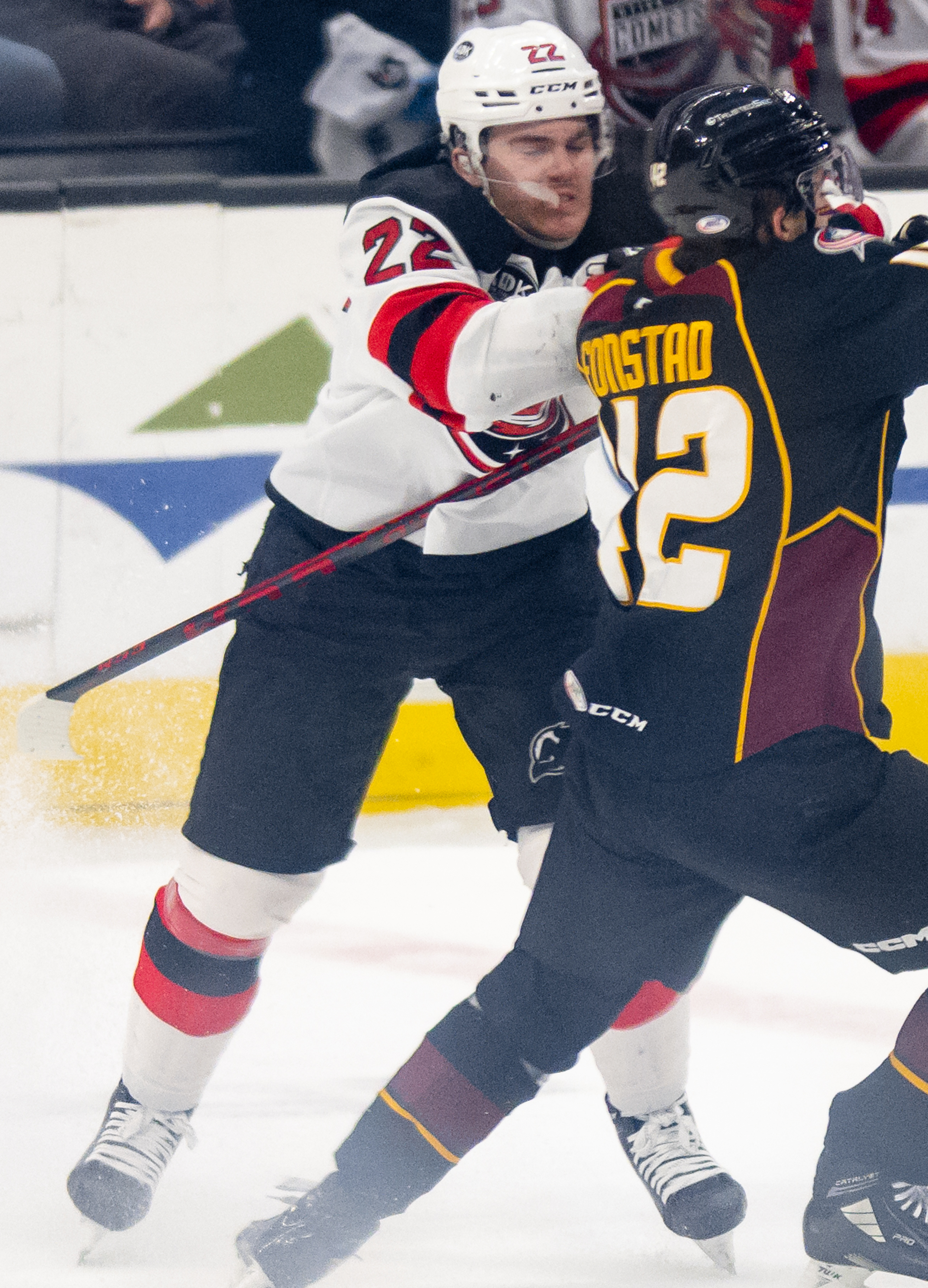
- Walsh with the Utica Comets in 2023
- Born: April 21, 1999 (age 27) Framingham, Massachusetts, U.S.
- Height: 5 ft 11 in (180 cm)
- Weight: 192 lb (87 kg; 13 st 10 lb)
- Position: Defense
- Shoots: Right
- NHL team (P) Cur. team Former teams: Montreal Canadiens; Laval Rocket (AHL); New Jersey Devils; Barys Astana
- NHL draft: 81st overall, 2017; New Jersey Devils
- Playing career: 2021–present

Reilly Walsh (born April 21, 1999) is an American professional ice hockey player who is a defenseman for the Laval Rocket of the American Hockey League (AHL) while under contract to the Montreal Canadiens of the National Hockey League (NHL). He was selected in the third round, 81st overall, by the New Jersey Devils in the 2017 NHL entry draft. Walsh has also previously played for Barys Astana in the Kontinental Hockey League (KHL).

== Playing career ==
=== Professional ===
Originally selected by the New Jersey Devils in the third round (81st overall) of the 2017 NHL entry draft, Walsh was signed to a three-year, entry-level contract by the team on August 10, 2020. During the 2021–22 season, he made his NHL debut for the Devils on April 26, 2022, recording his first NHL assist against the Ottawa Senators.

On June 26, 2023, Walsh was traded by the Devils to the Boston Bruins in exchange for Shane Bowers. After a lone season within the Bruins organization, he left as an unrestricted free agent to join the Los Angeles Kings on a one-year, two-way contract in July 2024.

Over the course of the 2024–25 season, Walsh played exclusively with the Kings' American Hockey League (AHL) affiliate, the Ontario Reign, posting 32 points through 70 regular season games.

Again a free agent at season's end, Walsh opted to sign his first contract abroad, agreeing to a one-year deal with Kazakhstani-based club Barys Astana of the Kontinental Hockey League (KHL) on August 18, 2025.

Despite inking a one-year extension with Barys in May 2026, Walsh ultimately had his contract terminated by the team on July 6. Thereafter, he signed with the Montreal Canadiens for the 2026–27 season on July 8.

== International play ==
Medal record

Ice hockey

Representing United States

Ivan Hlinka Memorial Tournament
Silver medal – second place	2016 Slovakia/Czech Republic	

Internationally, Walsh represented USA Hockey as part of their national under-18 team at the 2016 Ivan Hlinka Memorial Tournament, earning a silver medal.

== Personal life ==
He is the son of Mike Walsh who played a total of 14 NHL games with the New York Islanders from 1987 to 1989.

== Career statistics ==
=== Regular season and playoffs ===
			Regular season					Playoffs
Season	Team	League	GP	G	A	Pts	PIM	GP	G	A	Pts	PIM
2013–14	Proctor Academy	USHS	31	7	20	27	18	—	—	—	—	—
2014–15	Proctor Academy	USHS	35	13	32	45	38	—	—	—	—	—
2015–16	Proctor Academy	USHS	26	14	26	40	26	—	—	—	—	—
2015–16	Tri-City Storm	USHL	2	1	1	2	0	—	—	—	—	—
2016–17	Proctor Academy	USHS	30	30	39	69	32	—	—	—	—	—
2016–17	Chicago Steel	USHL	24	2	8	10	12	—	—	—	—	—
2017–18	Harvard University	ECAC	33	7	13	20	16	—	—	—	—	—
2018–19	Harvard University	ECAC	33	12	19	31	12	—	—	—	—	—
2019–20	Harvard University	ECAC	30	8	19	27	8	—	—	—	—	—
2020–21	Binghamton Devils	AHL	33	5	10	15	12	—	—	—	—	—
2021–22	Utica Comets	AHL	70	9	34	43	16	1	0	2	2	0
2021–22	New Jersey Devils	NHL	1	0	1	1	0	—	—	—	—	—
2022–23	Utica Comets	AHL	71	9	32	41	40	6	4	1	5	0
2023–24	Providence Bruins	AHL	60	9	19	28	14	4	0	2	2	0
2024–25	Ontario Reign	AHL	70	6	26	32	39	2	0	0	0	0
2025–26	Barys Astana	KHL	68	16	30	46	24	—	—	—	—	—
NHL totals			1	0	1	1	0	—	—	—	—	—
KHL totals			68	16	30	46	24	—	—	—	—	—

=== International ===
Year	Team	Event	Result	GP	G	A	Pts	PIM
2016	United States	IH18	2nd place, silver medalist(s)	5	0	1	1	4
Junior totals				5	0	1	1	4

== Awards and honors ==
Award	Year	Ref
USHL
CCM/USA Hockey All-American Prospects Game	2016	
Clark Cup champion	2017	
College
ECAC All-Rookie Team	2018	
ECAC Third All-Star Team	2019	
All-Ivy League Honorable Mention Team	2019, 2020	
