= Filip Chytil =

Czech ice hockey player (born 1999)

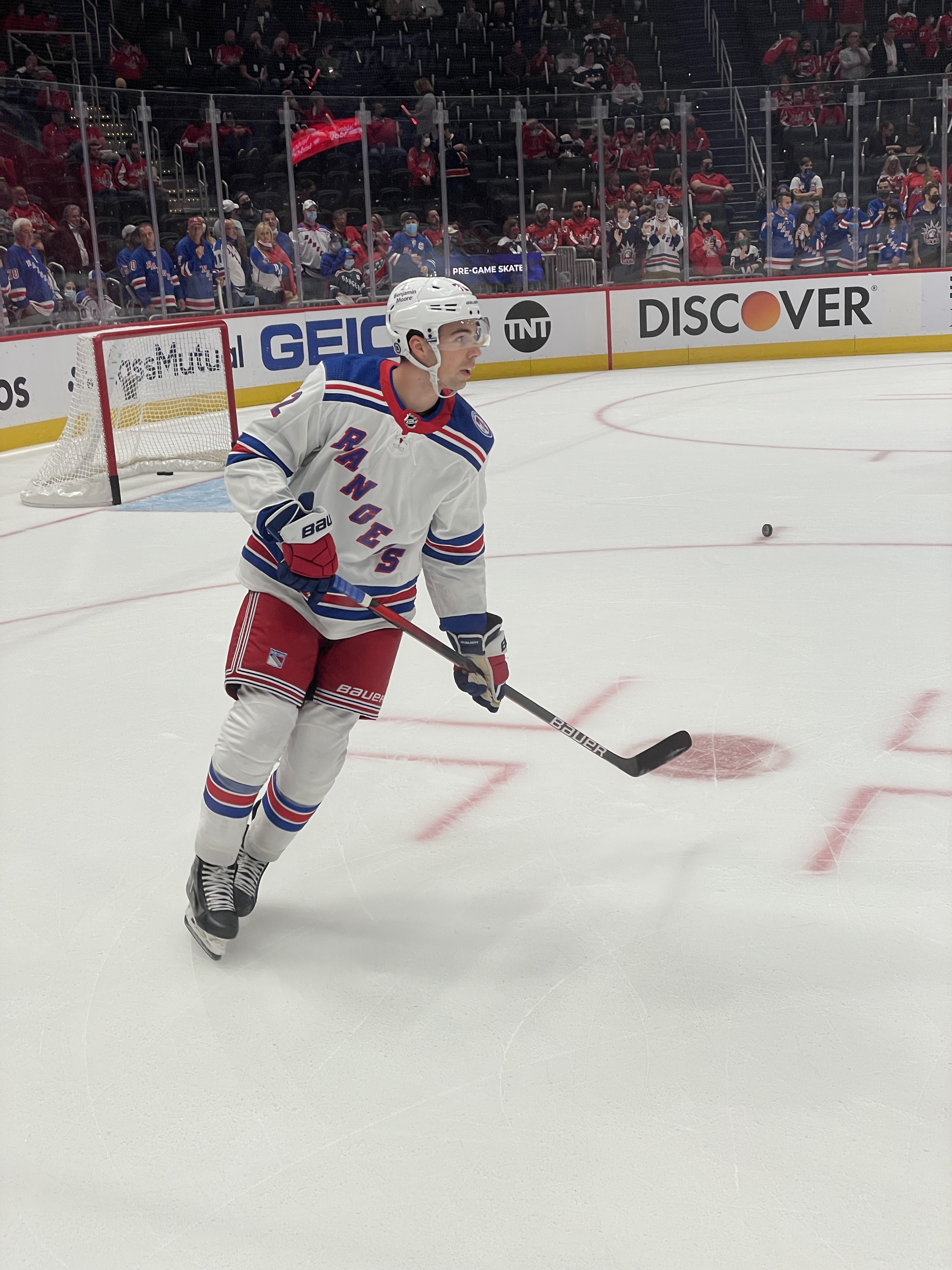
- Chytil with the New York Rangers in 2021
- Born: 5 September 1999 (age 27) Kroměříž, Czech Republic
- Height: 6 ft 2 in (188 cm)
- Weight: 210 lb (95 kg; 15 st 0 lb)
- Position: Centre
- Shoots: Left
- NHL team Former teams: Vancouver Canucks; PSG Zlín; New York Rangers
- National team: Czech Republic
- NHL draft: 21st overall, 2017; New York Rangers
- Playing career: 2016–present

Filip Chytil (FIHL-ihp HEE-tuhl; born 5 September 1999) is a Czech professional ice hockey player who is a centre for the Vancouver Canucks of the National Hockey League (NHL). He was drafted by the New York Rangers in the first round, 21st overall, in the 2017 NHL entry draft. Internationally, Chytil played for the Czech Republic national team in several tournaments.

== Playing career ==
Chytil played for PSG Zlín of the Czech Extraliga during the 2016–17 season. He recorded four goals and four assists in 38 games, which was the second highest total of games played, goals, assists and points among all players under age 18 in the league. He also played two games for Zlín's junior affiliate. A top prospect for the 2017 NHL entry draft, he was selected 21st overall by the New York Rangers. Shortly after the NHL Draft, Chytil was selected seventh overall in the CHL Import Draft by the North Bay Battalion. On 14 July 2017, Chytil signed a three-year, entry-level contract with the New York Rangers.

After participating in the Rangers' training camp, Chytil impressed and was selected by the local media with the Lars-Erik Sjöberg Award as top rookie in camp. He made it through the pre-season to earn a spot on the Rangers opening-night roster for the 2017–18 season. He secured a scoring role playing between Mats Zuccarello and Rick Nash. However, after playing two games at the NHL level, he was reassigned to the Rangers' American Hockey League (AHL) affiliate, the Hartford Wolf Pack. Chytil and fellow first-round pick Lias Andersson were called up by the Rangers on 25 March 2018. Chytil recorded his first NHL goal on 30 March, in a 7–3 loss to the Tampa Bay Lightning. On 29 July 2021, Chytil was re-signed to a two-year contract by the Rangers. On 29 March 2023, he signed a four-year contract extension with the team.

On 2 November 2023, during a 2–1 victory against the Carolina Hurricanes, Chytil suffered the fourth concussion of his career and was placed on injured reserve. On 28 January 2024, he was ruled out for the rest of the 2023–24 regular season after suffering a setback during practice two days earlier. Chytil returned to play on 9 May, in game 3 of the second round of the 2024 Stanley Cup playoffs in a 3–2 overtime win over the Carolina Hurricanes.

On 31 January 2025, Chytil, defenceman Victor Mancini and a conditional 2025 first-round pick were traded to the Vancouver Canucks in exchange for forward J. T. Miller, defenceman Erik Brännström and the rights to defenceman Jackson Dorrington. On 15 March, Chytil suffered another concussion, the fifth of his career, after being hit into the boards by Jason Dickinson during a 6–2 win over the Chicago Blackhawks. The hit was not penalized and Chytil missed the remainder of the regular season.

Chytil missed eight games to start the 2026–27 NHL season; after playing seven games, Chytil was placed on injured reserve on 30 October 2026 after taking a hit from Darnell Nurse during a game against the San Jose Sharks on 29 October 2026.

== International play ==
Chytil was a member of the Czech Republic under-18 team that won gold at the 2016 Ivan Hlinka Memorial Tournament.

== Career statistics ==
=== Regular season and playoffs ===
| | | | Regular season | | | | | Playoffs |
| Season | Team | League | GP | G | A | Pts | PIM | GP | G | A | Pts | PIM |
|---|---|---|---|---|---|---|---|---|---|---|---|---|
| 2014–15 | PSG Zlín | CZE U18 | 19 | 6 | 3 | 9 | 10 | — | — | — | — | — |
| 2015–16 | PSG Zlín | CZE U18 | 30 | 28 | 22 | 50 | 8 | — | — | — | — | — |
| 2016–17 | PSG Zlín | CZE U20 | 2 | 0 | 0 | 0 | 0 | 1 | 0 | 0 | 0 | 0 |
| 2016–17 | PSG Zlín | ELH | 38 | 4 | 4 | 8 | 16 | — | — | — | — | — |
| 2017–18 | New York Rangers | NHL | 9 | 1 | 2 | 3 | 4 | — | — | — | — | — |
| 2017–18 | Hartford Wolf Pack | AHL | 46 | 11 | 20 | 31 | 6 | — | — | — | — | — |
| 2018–19 | New York Rangers | NHL | 75 | 11 | 12 | 23 | 8 | — | — | — | — | — |
| 2019–20 | Hartford Wolf Pack | AHL | 9 | 3 | 6 | 9 | 2 | — | — | — | — | — |
| 2019–20 | New York Rangers | NHL | 60 | 14 | 9 | 23 | 10 | 3 | 0 | 0 | 0 | 2 |
| 2020–21 | New York Rangers | NHL | 42 | 8 | 14 | 22 | 10 | — | — | — | — | — |
| 2021–22 | New York Rangers | NHL | 67 | 8 | 14 | 22 | 14 | 20 | 7 | 2 | 9 | 4 |
| 2022–23 | New York Rangers | NHL | 74 | 22 | 23 | 45 | 30 | 7 | 1 | 3 | 4 | 0 |
| 2023–24 | New York Rangers | NHL | 10 | 0 | 6 | 6 | 4 | 6 | 0 | 0 | 0 | 2 |
| 2024–25 | New York Rangers | NHL | 41 | 11 | 9 | 20 | 14 | — | — | — | — | — |
| 2024–25 | Vancouver Canucks | NHL | 15 | 2 | 4 | 6 | 4 | — | — | — | — | — |
| 2025–26 | Vancouver Canucks | NHL | 12 | 3 | 0 | 3 | 6 | — | — | — | — | — |
| ELH totals | | | 38 | 4 | 4 | 8 | 16 | — | — | — | — | — |
| NHL totals | | | 405 | 80 | 93 | 173 | 104 | 36 | 8 | 5 | 13 | 8 |

=== International ===
| Year | Team | Event | Result | GP | G | A | Pts | PIM |
|---|---|---|---|---|---|---|---|---|
| 2015 | Czech Republic | U17 | 7th | 5 | 0 | 1 | 1 | 0 |
| 2016 | Czech Republic | IH18 | 1st place, gold medalist(s) | 4 | 2 | 1 | 3 | 0 |
| 2017 | Czech Republic | U18 | 7th | 5 | 2 | 3 | 5 | 2 |
| 2018 | Czech Republic | WJC | 4th | 7 | 2 | 2 | 4 | 0 |
| 2018 | Czech Republic | WC | 7th | 7 | 1 | 1 | 2 | 2 |
| 2021 | Czech Republic | WC | 7th | 8 | 2 | 2 | 4 | 2 |
| 2023 | Czech Republic | WC | 8th | 2 | 0 | 1 | 1 | 2 |
| Junior totals | | | | 21 | 6 | 7 | 13 | 2 |
| Senior totals | | | | 17 | 3 | 4 | 7 | 6 |

Awards and achievements
| Preceded by Lias Andersson | New York Rangers first-round draft pick 2017 | Succeeded by Vitali Kravtsov |
