= Filip Krivošík =

Slovak ice hockey player (born 1999)

- Born: 27 March 1999 (age 27) Bratislava, Slovakia
- Height: 6 ft 4 in (193 cm)
- Weight: 207 lb (94 kg; 14 st 11 lb)
- Position: Centre
- Shoots: Right
- Slovak team Former teams: HK Dukla Trenčin; HC Košice; Pirati Chomutov; HPK; LeKi; SaiPa; HK Nitra; BK Mladá Boleslav
- Playing career: 2017–present

Filip Krivošík (born 27 March 1999) is a Slovak professional ice hockey forward who is currently playing for HC Košice in the Slovak Extraliga.

== Career ==
Krivošík spent most of his career in Finland, where he played for the Liiga teams HPK, where he made his professional debut in 2017 and SaiPa as well as the second-tier Mestis team Lempäälän Kisa. In 2021 he joined the Slovak Extraliga team HK Nitra.

== Career statistics ==
=== Regular season and playoffs ===
			Regular season					Playoffs
Season	Team	League	GP	G	A	Pts	PIM	GP	G	A	Pts	PIM
2017–18	HPK	Liiga	6	1	0	1	2	—	—	—	—	—
2018–19	HPK	Liiga	24	1	2	3	8	8	1	0	1	6
2019–20	HPK	Liiga	57	11	12	23	18	—	—	—	—	—
2020–21	SaiPa	Liiga	14	2	2	4	2	—	—	—	—	—
2021–22	HK Nitra	SVK	26	9	19	28	51	19	4	8	12	22
2022–23	HK Nitra	SVK	42	8	18	26	34	5	1	5	6	8
2023–24	HC Košice	SVK	22	9	9	18	6	—	—	—	—	—
Liiga totals			101	15	16	31	30	8	1	0	1	6
SVK totals			90	26	46	72	91	27	5	13	18	30

=== International ===
Year	Team	Event	Result	GP	G	A	Pts	PIM
2016	Slovakia	WJC18	5th	5	0	0	0	0
2016	Slovakia	IH18	7th	4	4	1	5	2
2017	Slovakia	WJC18	6th	5	0	1	1	10
2018	Slovakia	WJC	7th	5	2	1	3	2
2019	Slovakia	WJC	8th	5	1	1	2	2
Junior totals				24	7	4	11	16
