= 2015 World U-17 Hockey Challenge =

Youth tournament

Tournament details
- Host country: Canada
- Dates: November 5 – November 11
- Teams: 8

The 2015 World Under-17 Hockey Challenge was an ice hockey tournament held in Dawson Creek and Fort St. John, British Columbia, Canada between November 5 and 11. The World Under-17 Hockey Challenge is held by Hockey Canada annually to showcase young hockey talent from across Canada and other strong hockey countries.

== Challenge results ==
=== Preliminary round ===
==== Group A ====
Team	Pld	W	OTW	OTL	L	GF	GA	GD	Pts
United States	3	3	0	0	0	19	7	+12	9
Czech Republic	3	1	0	1	1	7	12	−5	4
Canada White	3	1	0	0	2	12	13	−1	3
Canada Black	3	0	1	0	2	8	14	−6	2

===== Results =====
November 1, 2015	Canada Black	3 – 5	Canada White	Encana Events Centre, Dawson Creek

November 2, 2015	United States	6 – 1	Czech Republic	Encana Events Centre, Dawson Creek

November 2, 2015	Canada White	5 – 7	United States	Encana Events Centre, Dawson Creek

November 3, 2015	Czech Republic	3 – 4 SO	Canada Black	Encana Events Centre, Dawson Creek

November 3, 2015	Czech Republic	3 – 2	Canada White	Encana Events Centre, Dawson Creek

November 4, 2015	United States	6 – 1	Canada Black	Encana Events Centre, Dawson Creek

==== Group B ====
Team	Pld	W	OTW	OTL	L	GF	GA	GD	Pts
Canada Red	3	2	1	0	0	11	5	+6	8
Finland	3	2	0	0	1	13	9	+4	6
Russia	3	1	0	1	1	11	12	−1	4
Sweden	3	0	0	0	3	6	15	−9	0

November 1, 2015	Russia	5 – 2	Sweden	North Peace Arena, Fort St. John

November 2, 2015	Canada Red	3 – 1	Finland	North Peace Arena, Fort St. John

November 2, 2015	Finland	6 – 3	Russia	North Peace Arena, Fort St. John

November 3, 2015	Sweden	1 – 4	Canada Red	North Peace Arena, Fort St. John

November 3, 2015	Sweden	3 – 6	Finland	North Peace Arena, Fort St. John

November 4, 2015	Russia	3 – 4 OT	Canada Red	North Peace Arena, Fort St. John

=== Play Offs ===
Quarterfinals
5 November
United States	4
Sweden	5
6 November
Finland	2
Canada White	4
5 November
Canada Red	3
Canada Black	2
6 November
Czech Republic	1
Russia	6

Semifinals
7 November
Sweden	1
Canada White	2
7 November
Canada Red	2
Russia	3 SO

Final
8 November
Canada White	6
Russia	2
Third place
8 November
Sweden	3
Canada Red	0

== Final standings ==
	Team
1st place, gold medalist(s)	Canada White
2nd place, silver medalist(s)	Russia
3rd place, bronze medalist(s)	Sweden
4	Canada Red
5	Finland
6	United States
7	Czech Republic
8	Canada Black
