= Jørgen =

Jørgen is a Danish, Norwegian, and Faroese male given name cognate to George. Notable people with the name include:

== A ==
- Jørgen Aabye (1868–1959), Danish painter
- Jørgen Aall (1771–1833), Norwegian ship-owner and politician
- Jørgen Andersen (1886–1973), Norwegian gymnast
- Jørgen von Ansbach (1510–1591), German-Norwegian merchant and mayor
- Jørgen Arboe-Rasmussen (1925–1945), Danish resistance member
- Jørgen Arenholt (1876–1953), Danish tennis player
- Jørgen Åsland (born 1946), Norwegian politician
- Jørgen Aukland (born 1975), Norwegian cross-country skier

== B ==
- Jørgen Baklid (born 1999), Norwegian orienteer
- Jørgen Barth-Jørgensen (1932–2021), Norwegian weightlifter
- Jørgen Thomsen Bech (1731–1816), Danish businessman
- Jørgen Beck (1914–1991), Danish film actor
- Jørgen Bender (1938–1999), Danish fashion designer
- Jørgen Bentzon (1897–1951), Danish composer
- Jørg Berge (1854–1916), Norwegian politician
- Vilhelm Bergsøe (1835–1911), Danish author and scientist
- Jørgen Bjelke (1621–1696), Norwegian officer and nobleman
- Johnny Bjerregaard (born 1943), Danish footballer and coach
- Jørgen Bjørn (1652–1704), Danish Governor of Tranquebar from 1702 to 1704
- Jørgen Bjørnstad (1894–1942), Norwegian gymnast
- Jørgen Blydt (1868–1938), Norwegian politician
- Jørgen Boassen (born 1974), Danish-Greenlandic political figure
- Jørgen Boberg (1940–2009), Danish painter and illustrator
- Jørgen Bojsen-Møller (born 1954), Danish sailor and Olympic Champion
- Jørgen Ditleff Bondesen (1855–1939), Danish composer and music theorist
- Jørgen Thygesen Brahe (1515–1565), Danish nobleman
- Jørgen Otto Brockenhuus (1664–1728), Danish-Norwegian military officer
- Jørgen Brønlund (1877–1907), Greenlandic polar explorer, educator, and catechist
- Jørgen Bru (1881–1974) was a Norwegian sports shooter
- Jørgen Brunchorst (1862–1917), Norwegian natural scientist, politician and diplomat
- Jørgen Buckhøj (1935–1994), Danish actor
- Jørgen Hansen Burchart (born c. 1630), Danish-Norwegian politician

== C ==
- Jørgen Cappelen (born 1959), Norwegian rower
- Jørgen Wright Cappelen (1805–1878), Norwegian bookseller and publisher
- Jørgen Carling (born 1974), Norwegian migration researcher
- Jørgen Christensen-Dalsgaard (born 1950), Danish astronomer
- Jørgen Mads Clausen (born 1948), Danish businessman
- Jørgen Conradt (1771–1851), Danish coppersmith

== D ==
- Jørgen Balthasar Dalhoff (1800–1890), Danish goldsmith and industrialist
- Jørgen Dam (born 1941), Danish long-distance runner
- Jørgen Dobloug (1945–2018), Norwegian artist
- Jørgen Dybvad (1545–1612), Danish theologian and mathematician
- Jørgen Iversen Dyppel (1638–1683), Governor of the Danish West Indies

== E ==
- Jørgen Tandberg Ebbesen (1812–1887), Norwegian politician
- Jørgen Emborg (born 1953), Danish jazz pianist and composer
- Jørgen Engelbrecht (born 1946), Danish rower

== F ==
- Jørgen Conrad de Falsen (1785–1849), Danish-Norwegian naval officer
- Jørgen Breder Faye (1823–1908), Norwegian banker and politician
- Jørgen Finne-Grønn (1905–1998), Norwegian diplomat
- Jørgen Leonard Firing (1894–1977), Norwegian politician
- Jørgen Aall Flood (1820–1892), Norwegian businessman and politician
- Jørgen Flood (1792–1867), Norwegian merchant and politician
- Jørgen Fogh (1631–1685), Danish Supreme Court justice and mayor of Copenhagen
- Jørgen Frandsen (born 1944), Danish handball player
- Jørgen Frantzen (1935–2020), Danish rower
- Jørgen Fredsøe (born 1947), Danish hydraulic engineer
- Jørgen Friis (died 1616), Danish statesman
- Jørgen Friis (bishop) (1495–1547), Danish Catholic priest
- Jacob Wilhelm Frohne (1832–1909), Danish master mason, architect and art collector
- Peter Jørgen Frydendahl (1766–1830), Danish stage actor
- Jørgen Watne Frydnes (born 1984), Norwegian political scientist

== G ==
- Jørgen Gabrielsen (born 1935), Danish sports shooter
- Jørgen Gammelgaard (1938–1991), Danish furniture designer
- Jørgen Garde (1939–1996), Danish Royal Navy admiral
- Jørgen Gluver (born 1960), Danish handball player
- Jørgen Graabak (born 1991), Norwegian Nordic combined skier
- Jørgen Pedersen Gram (1850–1916), Danish actuary and mathematician
- Jørgen Grave (1909–1988), Norwegian politician
- Jørgen Gry (1915–1993), Danish field hockey player
- Jørgen Gudmundsen-Holmgreen (1895–1966), Danish sculptor
- Jørgen Guldborg-Rasmussen, President of the Danish Scout Council
- Jørgen Gunnerud (1948–2025), Norwegian crime fiction writer

== H ==
- Jørgen Haave (born 1971), Norwegian literary scholar
- Jørgen Hammeken (1918-2007), Danish footballer
- Jørgen Hammer (born 1991), Norwegian footballer
- Jørgen Frantz Hammershaimb (1767–1820), Prime Minister of the Faroe Islands
- Jørgen Christian Hansen (1890–1953), Danish rower
- Jørgen Hansen (boxer) (1943–2018), Danish boxer
- Jørgen Hansen (cyclist) (born 1942), Danish cyclist
- Jørgen Hansen (footballer) (1931-1986), Danish footballer
- Jørgen Hansen (skier) (1885–1971), Norwegian Nordic skier
- Jørgen Hammergaard Hansen (1930–2013), Danish badminton player
- Jørgen Peder Hansen (1923–1994), Danish politician
- Jørgen Robert Hansen (1911–1991), Danish field hockey player
- Jørgen W. Hansen (1925–1969), Danish footballer
- Jørgen Hare (1923–2007), Danish sports shooter
- Jørgen Hatlehol (born 1997), Norwegian footballer
- Jørgen Haugan (born 1941), Norwegian author and lecturer
- Jørgen Johannes Havig (1808–1883), Norwegian politician
- Jørgen Heide (fl. 1542–1556), Danish composer
- Jørgen Heidemann (born 1946), Danish handball player
- Jørgen Henriksen (born 1942), Danish footballer
- Jørgen Herlufsen (born 1964), Danish sports shooter
- Jørgen Holmboe (1902–1979), Norwegian-American meteorologist
- Jørgen Holte (born 1944), Norwegian politician
- Jørgen Horn (born 1987), Norwegian footballer
- Jørgen Hustad (1896–1978), Norwegian newspaper editor and politician
- Jørgen Hval (1911–1992), Norwegian footballer
- Jørgen Hvidemose (born 1940), Danish football manager
- Jørgen Hviid (1916–2001), Danish athlete and naval officer

== I ==
- Jørgen Ingmann (1925–2015), Danish jazz and pop guitarist
- Jørgen Isnes (born 1979), Norwegian footballer and manager
- Jørgen Iversen (1918–1993), Danish footballer

== J ==
- Jørgen Jacobsen (1933-2010), Danish footballer
- Jørgen-Frantz Jacobsen (1900–1938), Faroese writer
- Jørgen Jahre (1907–1998), Norwegian shipowner and sports official
- Jørgen Jalland (born 1977), Norwegian footballer
- Jørgen Jensen (cyclist) (1947–2015), Danish cyclist
- Jørgen Jensen (politician) (1920–1987), Danish trade unionist and politician
- Jørgen Jensen (runner) (1944–2009), Danish runner
- Jørgen Jensen (soldier) (1891–1922), Australian Victoria Cross recipient
- Jørgen Jensen (wrestler) (1939–1995), Danish wrestler
- Jørgen Juul Jensen (born 1965), Danish footballer
- Jørgen Martinius Jensen, Norwegian historian and sports official
- Jørgen Jersild (1913–2004), Danish composer and music educator
- Jørgen Johansen (1928-1994), Danish footballer
- Jørgen Jørgensen (1780–1841), Danish adventurer
- Jørgen Jørgensen (cyclist) (1936–2016), Danish cyclist
- Jørgen Jørgensen (footballer) (1943–2019), Danish footballer
- Jørgen Jørgensen (philatelist) (born 1944), Danish philatelist
- Jørgen Jørgensen (politician) (1888–1974), Danish politician
- Jørgen Jørgensen (swimmer) (1914–1961), Danish swimmer
- Jørgen Juve (1906–1983), Norwegian footballer, jurist, and writer

== K ==
- Jørgen Kaas (1618–1658), Danish military officer
- Jørgen Karterud (born 1994), Norwegian ice hockey player
- Jørgen Kastholm (1931–2007), Danish furniture designer
- Jørgen Kieler (1919–2017), Danish physician and resistance member
- Jørgen Kiil (1931–2003), Danish actor
- Jørgen Christopher von Klenow (died 1723), Danish-Norwegian military officer
- Jørgen Klubien (born 1958), Danish animator, storyboard artist, and writer
- Jørgen Christian Knudsen (1843–1922), Norwegian politician
- Jørgen Vig Knudstorp (born 1968), Danish businessman
- Jørgen Alexander Knudtzon (1854–1917), Norwegian linguist and historian
- Jørgen von Cappelen Knudtzon (1784–1854), Norwegian businessman and patron of the arts
- Jørgen Hansen Koch (1787–1860), Danish architect
- Jørgen Kolstad (born 1995), Norwegian footballer
- Jørgen Kosmo (1947–2017), Norwegian politician
- Jørgen Kristensen (born 1946), Danish footballer
- Jørgen H. Kristiansen (born 1976), Norwegian politician
- Jørgen Kvist (born 1965), Danish politician

== L ==
- Jørgen Læssøe (1924–1993), Danish Assyriologist
- Jørgen Landt (c. 1751–1804), Danish priest, botanist and author
- Jørgen Langhelle (1965–2021), Norwegian actor
- Jørgen E. Larsen (1945–2020), Danish footballer and coach
- Jørgen Strand Larsen (born 2000), Norwegian footballer
- Jørgen Vase Larsen, the birthname of Marcel de Sade (1934–2025), Danish imposter
- Jörgen Lehmann (1898–1989), Danish-born Swedish physician and chemist
- Jørgen Leth (1937–2025), Danish poet and film director
- Jørgen Sigurd Lien, Norwegian software businessman
- Jørgen Adolf Lier (1906–1994), Norwegian politician
- Jørgen Lindegaard (born 1948), Danish businessman
- Jørgen Lindhardtsen (born 1945), Danish sailor
- Jørgen Lorentzen (born 1956), Norwegian literary scholar
- Jørgen Løvland (1848–1922), Prime Minister of Norway from 1907 to 1908
- Jørgen Løvset (1986–1981), Norwegian gynaecologist
- Jørgen Lunge (1577–1619), Danish nobleman and Rigsmarsk 1616–1619
- Jørgen Lykke (1515–1583), Danish nobleman, diplomat and politician
- Jørgen Lyng (born 1934), Danish Army general
- Jørgen B. Lysholm (1796–1843), Norwegian businessman

== M ==
- Jørgen Mandix (1759–1835), Norwegian judge
- Jørgen Marcussen (born 1950), Danish cyclist
- Jørgen Markussen (born 1943), Danish footballer
- Jørgen Mathiesen (1901–1993), Norwegian landowner and businessperson
- Jørgen Mathisen (born 1984), Norwegian jazz musician
- Jørgen Herman Meinich (1868–1948), Norwegian government official
- Jørgen Meinich (1820–1911), Norwegian jurist and industrialist
- Jørgen Ernst Meyer (1802–1873), Danish industrialist
- Jørgen Michelet (1742–1818), Norwegian military officer
- Jørgen Moe (1813–1882), Norwegian folklorist, poet and bishop
- Jørgen Mohrendal, the birthname of Georg Mohr (1640–1697), Danish mathematician
- Jørgen Mohus (born 1991), Norwegian footballer
- Jørgen Møller (1873–1944), Danish chess player
- Jørgen Nielsen Møller (1801–1862), Danish merchant and Inspector of South Greenland
- Jørgen Moritzen (1918–2002), Danish weightlifter
- Jørgen Müller (1648–1695), Dano-Norwegian government official
- Jørgen Peter Müller (1866–1938), Danish gymnastics educator
- Jørgen Munkeby (born 1980), Norwegian musician
- Jørgen de Mylius (born 1946), Danish radio and TV personality
- Jørgen Myran (born 1998), Norwegian curler

== N ==
- Jørgen Nash (1920–2004), Danish artist, writer, and Situationist theoretician
- Jørgen Neumann (born 1966), Norwegian footballer and manager
- Jørgen Niclasen (born 1969), Faroese politician
- Jørgen Nielsen (footballer, born 1971), Danish footballer
- Jørgen Boye Nielsen (1925–2000), Danish hockey player
- Jørgen Erik Nielsen (1933–2007), University of Copenhagen associate professor
- Jørgen S. Nielsen (born 1946), Danish Islamic studies scholar
- Jørgen Nordhagen (born 2005), Norwegian cyclist
- Jørgen Nordvik (1895–1977), Norwegian jurist
- Jørgen Nørredam (died 1965), Danish aid worker

== O ==
- Jørgen Olesen (1924-1999), Danish footballer
- Ib Olsen (1929–2009), Danish rower
- Jørgen Olufsen, Danish politician
- Jørgen Østergaard (born 1944), Danish engineer
- Jørgen Olsen Øveraas (born 1989), Norwegian footballer

== P ==
- Jørgen Pedersen (1914–1978), Danish epidemiologist
- Jørgen V. Pedersen (born 1959), Danish cyclist
- Jørgen Bo Petersen (born 1970), Danish cyclist
- Jørgen Fryd Petersen (1925–1988), Danish weightlifter
- Jörgen Philip-Sörensen (1938–2010), Swedish businessman
- Jørgen Plaetner (1930–2002), Danish composer
- Jørgen Munk Plum (1925–2011), Danish discus thrower

== R ==
- Jørgen Randers (born 1945), Norwegian professor of climate strategy
- Jørgen Rantzau (1652–1713), Danish military officer
- Jørgen Rasmussen (footballer, born 1937), Danish footballer
- Jørgen Rasmussen (footballer, born 1945), Danish footballer
- Jørgen Buhl Rasmussen (born 1955), Danish businessman
- Jørgen Frank Rasmussen (1930–2009), Danish cyclist
- Jørgen Skafte Rasmussen (1878–1964), Danish engineer and industrialist
- Jørgen Ravn (1940–2015), Danish footballer
- Jørgen Ravn (gymnast) (1884–1962), Danish gymnast
- Jørgen Henrich Rawert (1751–1823), Danish architect
- Jørgen Reedtz (c. 1625–1682), County governor, diplomat and landowner
- Jørgen Reenberg (1927–2023), Danish actor
- Jørgen Ringnis (died 1652), Danish woodcarver
- Jørgen Rischel (1934–2007), Danish linguist
- Jørgen Roed (1808–1888), Danish painter
- Jørgen Rømer (1923–2007), Danish art historian, graphic artist and painter
- Jørgen Rosenkrantz (1607–1675), Danish county governor and headmaster
- Jørgen Rostrup (born 1978), Norwegian orienteering competitor
- Jørgen Wilhelm Rudolph (1881–1968), Norwegian businessperson
- Jørgen Rydder (1923–1944), Danish resistance member
- Jørgen Ryg (1927–1981), Danish actor
- Jørgen Rytterager (1809–1899), Norwegian farmer

== S ==
- Jørgen Sadolin (c. 1490–1559), Danish bishop
- Jørgen Salsten (born 1963), Norwegian ice hockey player
- Jørgen Jacob Scheel (1916–1989), Danish ichthyologist
- Jørgen Matthias Christian Schiødte (1815–1884), Danish entomologist
- Jørgen Haagen Schmith (1910–1944), Danish resistance member
- Jørgen Erik Skeel (1737–1795), Danish prime minister
- Jørgen Skjelvik (born 1991), Norwegian footballer
- Jørgen Skov (1925–2001), Danish cinematographer
- Jørgen Slots, Danish periodontist and professor of dentistry and microbiology
- Jørgen Smit (1916–1991), Norwegian educator and anthroposophist
- Jørgen Sonne (painter) (1801–1890), Danish painter
- Jørgen Sonne (writer) (1925–2015), Danish lyricist and writer
- Jørgen Sønstebø (1922–2013), Norwegian politician
- Jørgen Haugen Sørensen (1934–2021), Danish sculptor
- Jørgen Leschly Sørensen (1922–1999), Danish footballer
- Jørgen Sørlie (born 1956), Norwegian footballer
- Jørgen Fredrik Spørck (1787–1866), Norwegian politician and military officer
- Jørgen Strickert (born 1980), Norwegian satirist, comedian, broadcaster
- Jørgen Stubberud (1883–1980), Norwegian polar explorer

== T ==
- Jørgen Tandberg (1816–1884), Norwegian bishop and politician
- Jørgen Tengesdal (born 1979), Norwegian footballer and coach
- Jørgen Olsen Thon (1866–1937), Norwegian politician
- Jørgen Thormøhlen (1640–1708), German-born Norwegian industrialist
- Jens Jørgen Thorsen (1932–2000), Danish artist, director, and jazz musician
- Jørgen Thorup (born 1950), Danish fencer
- Jørgen Berner Thrap (1898–1990), Norwegian judge
- Jørgen Træen (born 1973), Norwegian musician
- Jørgen Tramm (born 1965), Danish rower
- Jørgen Ditlev Trampe (1807–1868), Danish nobleman and civil servant

== U ==
- Jørgen Ulrich (1935–2010), Danish tennis player
- Jørgen Knudsen Urne (1598–1642), Danish noble

== V ==
- Jørgen Vik (born 1990), Norwegian football coach
- Jørgen Vodsgaard (born 1942), Danish handball player
- Jørgen Vogt (1900–1972), Norwegian newspaper editor and politician
- Jørgen Herman Vogt (1784–1862), Norwegian politician
- Jørgen Voilås (born 1998), Norwegian footballer

== W ==
- Jörgen Wålemark (born 1972), Swedish footballer and manager
- Jørgen Weel (1922–1993), Danish actor
- Jørgen Wichfeld (1729–1797), Danish judge
- Jørgen Balthazar Winterfeldt (1732–1821), Danish naval officer
- Jørgen Peter Frederik Wulff (1808–1881), Danish naval officer

== Y ==
- Jørgen Young (1781–1837), Norwegian politician

== See also ==
- Jörgen (disambiguation)
- Jurgen (disambiguation)
- Jørn
- Göran
