= Jörgen (name) =

Jörgen is a village in Austria.

Jörgen, a Scandinavian male given name for George, may refer to:

- Jörgen Andersen (born 1941), Danish canoeist
- Jörgen Andersson (born 1951), Swedish actor, dramaturge and pedagog
- Jörgen Augustsson (born 1952), Swedish footballer
- Jörgen Bemström (born 1974), Swedish ice hockey player
- Jörgen Berglund (born 1974), Swedish politician
- Jörgen Brink (born 1974), Swedish cross-country skier and biathlete
- Jörgen Brunchorst (1862–1917), Norwegian naturalist and politician
- Jörgen Dafgård (born 1964), Swedish composer
- Jörgen Düberg (born 1956), Swedish actor
- Jörgen Elofsson (born 1962), Swedish songwriter
- Jørgen Engelbrecht (born 1946), Danish rower
- Jörgen Ericsson (born 1953), Swedish rear admiral and commander of the navy
- Jörgen Eriksson (born 1973), Swedish footballer
- Jörgen Grubb (born 1962), Swedish politician
- Jörgen Häggqvist (born 1962), Swedish judoka
- Jörgen Hammergaard Hansen (1930–2013), Danish badminton player
- Jörgen Hellman (born 1963), Swedish politician
- Jörgen Hellman (born 1963), Swedish politician
- Jörgen Holmberg (born 1962), Swedish ice hockey player
- Jörgen Holmquist (1947–2014), Swedish diplomat
- Jörgen Huitfeldt (born 1970), Swedish journalist
- Jörgen Johansson (1947–2010), Swedish politician
- Jörgen Jönsson (born 1972), Swedish ice hockey player
- Jörgen Kolni (born 1946), Swedish sailor
- Jörgen Krabbe (1633–1678), Danish–Swedish lawyer and nobleman
- Jörgen Kruth (born 1974), Swedish kickboxer and MMA fighter
- Jörgen Lantz (born 1943), Swedish actor
- Jörgen Lehmann (1898–1989), Danish-born Swedish physician and chemist
- Jörgen Lennartsson (born 1965), Swedish footballer and manager
- Jörgen Liik (1990–2025), Estonian theatre, film, and television actor
- Jörgen Lindegaard (born 1948), Danish businessman
- Jörgen Lindman (born 1952), Swedish footballer
- Jörgen Lindström (born 1951), Swedish actor
- Jörgen Ljungberg (born 1967), Swedish powerlifter and strongman
- Jörgen Lundgren (born 1969), Swedish footballer
- Jörgen Mårtensson (born 1959), Swedish orienteer
- Jörgen Moberg (born 1971), Swedish footballer
- Jörgen Möller (1873–1944), Danish chess player
- Jörgen Ohlin (1937–2013), Swedish footballer
- Jörgen Ohlsson (born 1972), Swedish footballer
- Jörgen Olsson (badminton) (born 1976), Swedish badminton player
- Jörgen Olsson (orienteer) (born 1971), Swedish orienteering competitor
- Jörgen Olsson (wrestler) (born 1968), Swedish wrestler
- Jörgen Pääjärvi (born 1969), Swedish freestyle skier
- Jörgen Persson (born 1966), Swedish table tennis player
- Jörgen Persson (cinematographer) (born 1936), Swedish cinematographer
- Jörgen Persson (footballer), Swedish footballer
- Jörgen Pettersson (footballer) (born 1975), Swedish footballer
- Jörgen Pettersson (ice hockey) (born 1956), Swedish ice hockey player
- Jörgen Philip-Sörensen (1938–2010), Swedish businessman
- Jörgen Ragnarsson (born 1954), Swedish sailor
- Jörgen Skafte Rasmussen (1878–1964), Danish engineer
- Jörgen Raymann (born 1966), Dutch-Surinamese comedian and presenter
- Jörgen van Rijen (born 1975), Dutch classical trombonist
- Jörgen Sandström (born 1971), Swedish musician and singer
- Jörgen Nielsen Schaumann (1879–1953), Swedish dermatologist
- Jörgen Smit (1916–1991), Norwegian educator and anthroposophist
- Jörgen Strand (born 1963), Finnish politician
- Jörgen Sundelin (born 1945), Swedish sailor
- Jörgen Sundeqvist (born 1962), Swedish accordionist
- Jörgen Sundqvist (alpine skier) (born 1962), Swedish alpine skier
- Jörgen Sundqvist (ice hockey) (born 1982), Swedish ice hockey player
- Jörgen Wålemark (born 1972), Swedish footballer and manager
- Jörgen Wännström (born 1969), Swedish ice hockey player
- Jörgen Warborn (born 1969), Swedish politician
- Jörgen Windahl (born 1963), Swedish tennis player
- Jörgen Zoega (1755–1809), Danish archaeologist, numismatist and anthropologist

== See also ==
- Jørgen
- Jürgen
