= Fragola =

Fragola may refer to:

- Fragola, one of almost 50 aliases of the Isabella grape, also known as "fragola" (strawberry) in Italy
- Fragola, horse winning Critérium International horse race in 1894
- Lorenzo Fragola, Italian singer-songwriter

See also

- Fragolino, an Italian sparkling red wine produced in Veneto with Isabella grape
