= Modulation (disambiguation) =

Modulation is the process of varying one or more properties of a high-frequency periodic waveform.

Modulation, Modulations, Modulate, and Modulator may also refer to:

== Science ==
- Signal modulation
- Immunomodulation therapy
- Neuromodulation (disambiguation)
- Receptor modulator

== Music ==
- Modulation (music), a change of key
- Modulating subject, a fugue subject which modulates
- Ring modulation, a signal processing function use by synthesizers or effects units
- Modulate (band), UK electronic band
- The Modulations, 1970s American band
- Modulations A History of Electronic Music by Peter Shapiro, 2000 accompanying book to 1998 documentary

=== Albums ===
- Modulations (film), 1998 film and soundtrack album, with 2000 book about the history of electronic music
- Modulate (album), a rock/electronica album by Bob Mould
- Modulator (EP), an electronica EP by Information Society

=== Classical compositions ===
- Modulation, Johannes Fritsch
- Modulationes for 6 voices, Zarlino
- Modulations, Jørgen Plaetner

== Other ==
- Federal Signal Modulator, a civil defense siren
- Modulation (European Union), an authorized reduction in direct aid to producers
