= Jorgen =

Jorgen may refer to:

- Jørgen, a Scandinavian male given name
- Jörgen, an Austrian village
- Jörgen (name), a Scandinavian male given name
