= Holmquist =

Holmquist is a surname of Swedish origin (see Holmqvist). Holmquist may refer to:

- Bengt Holmquist (1926–1993), Swedish diplomat
- Claire Holmquist (1906–1972), American politician from Nebraska
- Doug Holmquist (1941–1988), American minor league baseball player and manager
- Ivar Holmquist (1879–1954), Swedish lieutenant general
- John Holmquist, American television animation director
- Joakim Holmquist (born 1969), Swedish Olympic freestyle swimmer
- Jörgen Holmquist (1947–2014), Swedish economist, Director-General of Internal Market and Services at the European Commission
- Ole Holmquist (1936–2020), Swedish trombonist

== See also ==
- Holmquist, South Dakota
