= Noah (grape) =

Variety of grape

- Grape (Vitis)
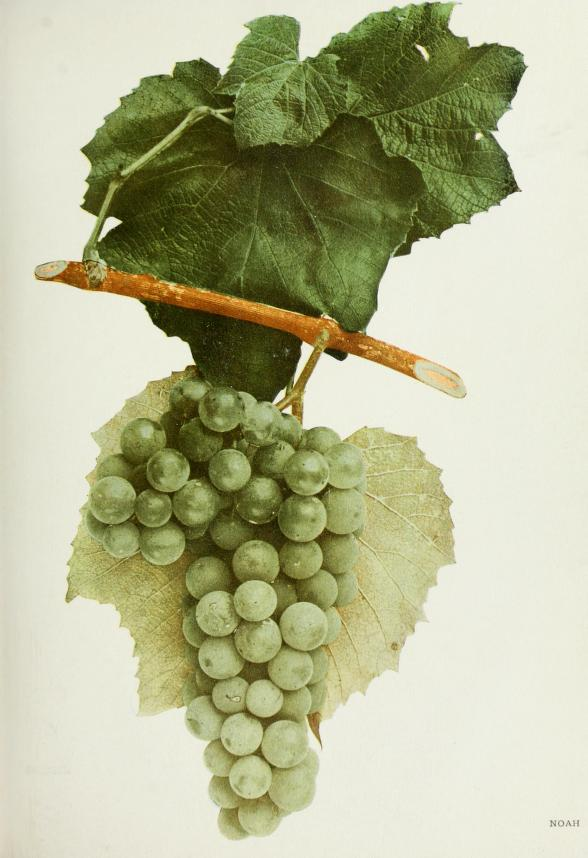
- Photographic plate of Noah grape from the book The Grapes of New York, 1908 by Ulysses Prentiss Hedrick
- Species: Vitis × labruscana
- Also called: Belo Otelo, Charvat and Tatar Rizling
- Origin: United States
- Notable regions: United States, France, Romania, Croatia and Italy
- Notable wines: Uhudler and Fragolino
- VIVC number: 8573

The Noah grape is a cultivar derived from the grape species Vitis labrusca or 'fox grape' which is used for table, juice and wine production. Noah has berries of a light green/yellow and has medium-sized, cylindrical-conical, well formed fruit clusters with thick bloom similar to those of Elvira.

Although popularly classified as Vitis labrusca, Noah is the result of a 50/50 cross between Taylor (Vitis riparia) and an unknown Vitis labrusca with other reports claiming the labrusca to be Hartford. The vines are moderately vigorous and moderately cold hardy. It buds late with secondary buds being fruitful and ripens approximately at the same time as Concord. Noah is very disease resistant and shows resistance to mildew, black rot and phylloxera – it is used as a rootstock. This cultivar has been falsely described as full of methanol, with high percentage, but actual percentage of methanol in Noha is between white and red vines(white cultivars around 98 mg/l, red cultivars around 131 mg/l, Noha 123 mg/l).

== Use ==
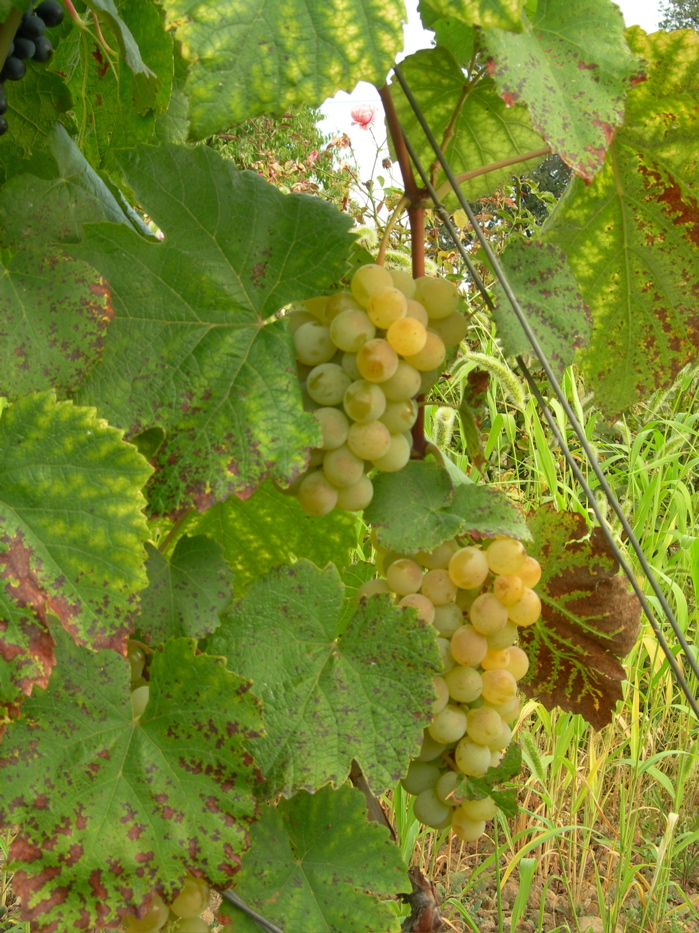
Noah grape

It is a slip skin variety, meaning that the skin separates easily from the fruit. The grapes are used to make wine, most notably Uhudler and to a lesser extent Fragolino. Noah being Vitis x labruscana imparts a 'foxiness' to the wine and because of this is thought to be objectionable, therefore it is not seen as a grape capable of making wines of good quality though does have its admirers.

Noah is not a commercially important grape variety with small plantations in United States, France, Romania, Croatia, Serbia and Italy. The grapes do not keep well and thus do not transport well therefore they can only be found within close distance of the source.

== Synonyms ==
Noah has a number of aliases including: Belo Otelo, Charvat, Hondarrabi Zuri, Tudum, Direktor, Noja, Noha and Tatar Rizling.
