= Jorgens =

Jorgens is a surname. Notable people with the name include:

- Arndt Jorgens (1905–1980), Norwegian-American baseball player
- Konrad Jörgens (1926–1974), German mathematician
- Orville Jorgens (1908–1992), American baseball player

== See also ==
- Jorgen (disambiguation)
