= Clinton (grape) =

Variety of grape

- Grape (Vitis)
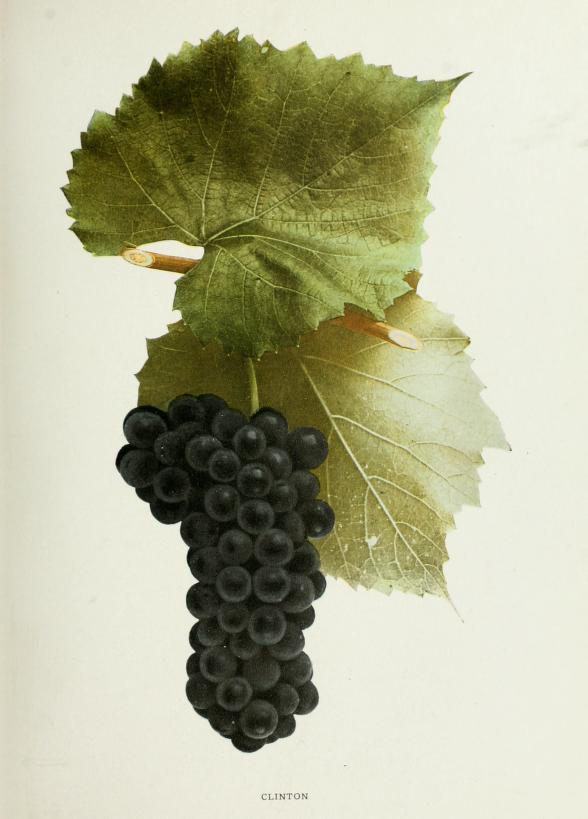
- Photographic plate of Clinton grape from the book The Grapes of New York, 1908 by Ulysses Prentiss Hedrick
- Species: Vitis riparia × Vitis labrusca
- Also called: Clinto (more)
- Origin: New York, USA
- Notable regions: Austria, Italy
- VIVC number: 2711

Clinton is a red variety of hybrid grape. Its strong resistance to phylloxera and mildews led to its being planted in several European countries (Austria, France, Italy, and Switzerland among them), as well as Brazil. Wines made from Clinton can have fruity flavors sometimes associated with raspberry or strawberry (similar to the world's most planted grape) and dark red color.

== History ==
Clinton is a spontaneous cross between the North American species Vitis riparia and Vitis labrusca. The first seedling was found in New York State by Hugh White in 1835. After phylloxera arrived in Europe, it was planted in northern Italy, Switzerland and Austria.

== Distribution and wines ==
It is grown in Brazil, France, and Italian Switzerland. In Austria it is one of the hybrid grapes used in Uhudler wines. In France it is illegal to sell commercially. In Italy it is known as Clinton, and is sometimes confused with the vitis x labruscana variety Isabella, known as "Fragola" (strawberry) in Italy. Ubriaco al Fragola Clinto is a Veneto cheese rubbed with the must of Fragola and Clinton.

== Vine and viticulture ==
It is a vigorous and early-maturing variety with small, black berries. It is very resistant to most mildews that affect grapevines as well as phylloxera.

== Synonyms ==
Bacchus Black (though unrelated to Bacchus,) Clinton Rose, Plant Des Carmes, Plant Pouzin, Red Ciliano, Vorthington, Worthington, Zephirin, Clinto, Fragola, Erdbeerer (German translation of Fragola).
