= EDGE (telecommunication) =

Mobile data technology for GSM networks

EDGE sign shown in notification bar on an Android-based smartphone

Enhanced Data rates for GSM Evolution (EDGE), also known as 2.75G and under various other names, is a 2G digital mobile phone technology for packet switched data transmission. It is part of the GSM family and represents an upgrade to General Packet Radio Service (GPRS), also known as "2.5G". EDGE is standardized by the 3GPP and offers speeds close to 3G technology, hence the name "2.75G".

EDGE was deployed on GSM networks beginning in 2003 – initially by Cingular (now AT&T) in the United States. It could be readily deployed on existing GSM and GPRS cellular equipment, making it an easier upgrade for cellular companies compared to the UMTS 3G technology that required significant changes. Through the introduction of sophisticated methods of coding and transmitting data, EDGE delivers higher bit-rates per radio channel, resulting in a threefold increase in capacity and performance compared with an ordinary GSM/GPRS connection - originally a max speed of 384 kbit/s. Later, Evolved EDGE was developed as an enhanced standard providing even more reduced latency and more than double performance, with a peak bit-rate of up to 1 Mbit/s.

== Name and definition ==
Enhanced Data rates for GSM Evolution is the common full name of the EDGE standard. Other names include: Enhanced GPRS (EGPRS), IMT Single Carrier (IMT-SC), and Enhanced Data rates for Global Evolution.

Although described as "2.75G" by the 3GPP body, EDGE is part of International Telecommunication Union (ITU)'s 3G definition. It is also recognized as part of the International Mobile Telecommunications - 2000 (IMT-2000) standard for 3G.

== Technology ==
Cellular network standards and generation timeline

EDGE/EGPRS is implemented as a bolt-on enhancement for 2.5G GSM/GPRS networks, making it easier for existing GSM carriers to upgrade to it. EDGE is a superset to GPRS and can function on any network with GPRS deployed on it, provided the carrier implements the necessary upgrade. EDGE requires no hardware or software changes to be made in GSM core networks. EDGE-compatible transceiver units must be installed and the base station subsystem needs to be upgraded to support EDGE. If the operator already has this in place, which is often the case today, the network can be upgraded to EDGE by activating an optional software feature. Today EDGE is supported by all major chip vendors for both GSM and WCDMA/HSPA.

=== Transmission techniques ===
In addition to Gaussian minimum-shift keying (GMSK), EDGE uses higher-order PSK/8 phase-shift keying (8PSK) for the upper five of its nine modulation and coding schemes. EDGE produces a 3-bit word for every change in carrier phase. This effectively triples the gross data rate offered by GSM. EDGE, like GPRS, uses a rate adaptation algorithm that adapts the modulation and coding scheme (MCS) according to the quality of the radio channel, and thus the bit rate and robustness of data transmission. It introduces a new technology not found in GPRS, incremental redundancy, which, instead of retransmitting disturbed packets, sends more redundancy information to be combined in the receiver. This increases the probability of correct decoding.

EDGE can carry a bandwidth up to 236 kbit/s (with end-to-end latency of less than 150 ms) for 4 timeslots (theoretical maximum is 473.6 kbit/s for 8 timeslots) in packet mode. This means it can handle four times as much traffic as standard GPRS. EDGE meets the International Telecommunication Union's requirement for a 3G network, and has been accepted by the ITU as part of the IMT-2000 family of 3G standards. It also enhances the circuit data mode called HSCSD, increasing the data rate of this service.

=== EDGE modulation and coding scheme (MCS) ===
The channel encoding process in GPRS as well as EGPRS/EDGE consists of two steps: first, a cyclic code is used to add parity bits, which are also referred to as the Block Check Sequence, followed by coding with a possibly punctured convolutional code. In GPRS, the Coding Schemes CS-1 to CS-4 specify the number of parity bits generated by the cyclic code and the puncturing rate of the convolutional code. In GPRS Coding Schemes CS-1 through CS-3, the convolutional code is of rate 1/2, i.e. each input bit is converted into two coded bits. In Coding Schemes CS-2 and CS-3, the output of the convolutional code is punctured to achieve the desired code rate. In GPRS Coding Scheme CS-4, no convolutional coding is applied.

In EGPRS/EDGE, the modulation and coding schemes MCS-1 to MCS-9 take the place of the coding schemes of GPRS, and additionally specify which modulation scheme is used, GMSK or 8PSK. MCS-1 through MCS-4 use GMSK and have performance similar (but not equal) to GPRS, while MCS-5 through MCS-9 use 8PSK. In all EGPRS modulation and coding schemes, a convolutional code of rate 1/3 is used, and puncturing is used to achieve the desired code rate. In contrast to GPRS, the Radio Link Control (RLC) and medium access control (MAC) headers and the payload data are coded separately in EGPRS. The headers are coded more robustly than the data.

GPRS coding scheme	Bitrate including RLC/MAC overhead (Note: This is rate at which the RLC/MAC layer protocol data unit (PDU) (called a radio block) is transmitted. As shown in TS 44.060 section 10.0a.1, a radio block consists of MAC header, RLC header, RLC data unit and spare bits. The RLC data unit represents the payload, the rest is overhead. The radio block is coded by the convolutional code specified for a particular Coding Scheme, which yields the same PHY layer data rate for all Coding Schemes.) (Note: Cited in various sources, e.g. in TS 45.001 table 1. is the bitrate including the RLC/MAC headers, but excluding the uplink state flag (USF), which is part of the MAC header, yielding a bitrate that is 0.15 kbit/s lower.) (kbit/s/slot)	Bitrate excluding RLC/MAC overhead (Note: The net bitrate here is the rate at which the RLC/MAC layer payload (the RLC data unit) is transmitted. As such, this bit rate excludes the header overhead from the RLC/MAC layers.) (kbit/s/slot)	Modulation	Code rate
CS-1	9.20	8.00	GMSK	1/2
CS-2	13.55	12.00	GMSK	≈2/3
CS-3	15.75	14.40	GMSK	≈3/4
CS-4	21.55	20.00	GMSK	1

EDGE modulation and coding scheme (MCS)	Bitrate including RLC/MAC overhead (kbit/s/slot)	Bitrate excluding RLC/MAC overhead (kbit/s/slot)	Modulation	Data code rate	Header code rate
MCS-1	9.20	8.00	GMSK	≈0.53	≈0.53
MCS-2	11.60	10.40	GMSK	≈0.66	≈0.53
MCS-3	15.20	14.80	GMSK	≈0.85	≈0.53
MCS-4	18.00	16.80	GMSK	1	≈0.53
MCS-5	22.80	21.60	8PSK	≈0.37	1/3
MCS-6	30.00	28.80	8PSK	≈0.49	1/3
MCS-7	45.20	44.00	8PSK	≈0.76	≈0.39
MCS-8	54.80	53.60	8PSK	≈0.92	≈0.39
MCS-9	59.60	58.40	8PSK	1	≈0.39

== Deployment ==
The first EDGE network was deployed by Cingular (now AT&T) in the United States on June 30, 2003, initially covering Indianapolis. T-Mobile US deployed their EDGE network in September 2005. In Canada, Rogers Wireless deployed their EDGE network in 2004. In Malaysia, DiGi launched EDGE beginning in May 2004 initially only in the Klang Valley.

In Europe, TeliaSonera in Finland rolled out EDGE in April 2004. Orange began trialling EDGE in France in April 2005 before a consumer rollout later that year. Bouygues Telecom completed its national deployment of EDGE in the country in 2005, strategically focusing on EDGE which is cheaper to deploy compared to 3G networks. Telfort was the first network in the Netherlands to roll out EDGE having done so by May 2005. Orange launched the UK's first EDGE network in February 2006.

The Global Mobile Suppliers Association reported in 2008 that EDGE networks have been launched in 147 countries around the world.

== Evolved EDGE ==
Evolved EDGE, also called EDGE Evolution and 2.875G, is a bolt-on extension to the GSM mobile telephony standard, which improves on EDGE in a number of ways. Latencies are reduced by lowering the Transmission Time Interval by half (from 20 ms to 10 ms). Bit rates are increased up to 1 Mbit/s peak bandwidth and latencies down to 80 ms using dual carrier, higher symbol rate and higher-order modulation (32QAM and 16QAM instead of 8PSK), and turbo codes to improve error correction. This results in real world downlink speeds of up to 600 kbit/s. Further the signal quality is improved using dual antennas improving average bit-rates and spectrum efficiency.

The main intention of increasing the existing EDGE throughput is that many operators would like to upgrade their existing infrastructure rather than invest on new network infrastructure. Mobile operators have invested billions in GSM networks, many of which are already capable of supporting EDGE data speeds up to 236.8 kbit/s. With a software upgrade and a new device compliant with Evolved EDGE (like an Evolved EDGE smartphone) for the user, these data rates can be boosted to speeds approaching 1 Mbit/s (i.e. 98.6 kbit/s per timeslot for 32QAM). Many service providers may not invest in a completely new technology like 3G networks.

Considerable research and development happened throughout the world for this new technology. A successful trial by Nokia Siemens and "one of China's leading operators" was achieved in a live environment. However, Evolved EDGE was introduced much later than its predecessor, EDGE, coinciding with the widespread adoption of 3G technologies such as HSPA and just before the emergence of 4G networks. This timing significantly limited its relevance and practical application, as operators prioritized investment in more advanced wireless technologies like UMTS and LTE.

Moreover, these newer technologies also targeted network coverage layers on low frequencies, further diminishing the potential advantages of Evolved EDGE. Coupled with the upcoming phase-out and shutdown of 2G mobile networks, it became very unlikely that Evolved EDGE would ever see deployment on live networks. As of 2016, no commercial networks supported the Evolved EDGE standard (3GPP Rel-7).

=== Technology ===
==== Reduced Latency ====
With Evolved EDGE come three major features designed to reduce latency over the air interface.

In EDGE, a single RLC data block (ranging from 23 to 148 bytes of data) is transmitted over four frames, using a single time slot. On average, this requires 20 ms for one way transmission. Under the RTTI scheme, one data block is transmitted over two frames in two timeslots, reducing the latency of the air interface to 10 ms.

In addition, Reduced Latency also implies support of Piggy-backed ACK/NACK (PAN), in which a bitmap of blocks not received is included in normal data blocks. Using the PAN field, the receiver may report missing data blocks immediately, rather than waiting to send a dedicated PAN message.

A final enhancement is RLC-non persistent mode. With EDGE, the RLC interface could operate in either acknowledged mode, or unacknowledged mode. In unacknowledged mode, there is no retransmission of missing data blocks, so a single corrupt block would cause an entire upper-layer IP packet to be lost. With non-persistent mode, an RLC data block may be retransmitted if it is less than a certain age. Once this time expires, it is considered lost, and subsequent data blocks may then be forwarded to upper layers.

==== Higher modulation schemes ====
Both uplink and downlink throughput is improved by using 16 or 32 QAM (quadrature amplitude modulation), along with turbo codes and higher symbol rates.

== Enhanced CSD ==
A lesser-known version of the EDGE standard is Enhanced Circuit Switched Data (ECSD), which is circuit switched.

== Compact-EDGE ==
A variant, so called Compact-EDGE, was developed for use in a portion of Digital AMPS network spectrum.

== Networks ==
The Global mobile Suppliers Association (GSA) states that, as of May 2013, there were 604 GSM/EDGE networks in 213 countries, from a total of 606 mobile network operator commitments in 213 countries.

== See also ==
- Broadband Internet access
- CDMA2000
- Evolution-Data Optimized
- List of device bandwidths
- Mobile broadband
- Spectral efficiency comparison table
- UMTS
- WiDEN
- Wi-Fi
- Comparison of mobile phone standards including LTE
- Comparison of wireless data standards including WiMAX and HSPA+
