= Tynæs =

Tynæs is a surname. Notable people with the surname include:

- Egil Tynæs (1941–2004), Norwegian anthroposophical doctor
- Martha Tynæs (1870–1930), Norwegian feminist
