= Jørgen Jørgensen (disambiguation) =

Jørgen Jørgensen (1780–1841) was a Danish adventurer during the Age of Revolution

Jørgen Jørgensen may also refer to:

- Jørgen Jørgensen (politician) (1888–1974), Danish politician
- Jørgen Jørgensen (philosopher) (1894–1969)
- Jørgen Jørgensen (swimmer) (1914–1961), Danish swimmer
- Jørgen Jørgensen (cyclist) (born 1936), Danish cyclist
- Jørgen Jørgensen (philatelist) (born 1944), Danish philatelist
- Jørgen Jørgensen (footballer)
