= Jørgen Fredsøe =

Danish hydraulic engineer (born 1947)

Jørgen Fredsøe (1947) is a Danish hydraulic engineer who is recognized for his contributions within bed form dynamics in rivers and the marine environment and coastal morphology including bars and beach undulations. Together with professor B. Mutlu Sumer he initiated the research on scour (erosion) in the seabed around coastal structures (such as offshore windturbines) applying detailed hydrodynamic interpretations. He was born in Randers, Denmark.

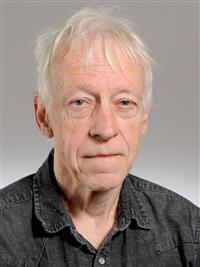
Jørgen Fredsøe

== Academic life ==
Fredsøe has a M.Sc. in 1971 and a Ph.D. in Civil Engineering in 1974, Technical University of Denmark. In 1984 he got the Dr. Tech. title with the Thesis: Sediment Transport in Currents and Waves (see e.g.), also at the Technical University of Denmark. He joined the faculty in Civil Engineering from 1974, and became a full professor in 1985. In 1979 he was visiting researcher at Iowa Institute of Hydraulic Research, University of Iowa, USA.

== Awards ==
Coastal Dynamic Award, 2005. Best paper awards, ASCE: American Society Civil Engineers), 1992 and 2005 (named Karl Emil Hilgard Prize). ISOPE Award 1992.

== Research ==
The research covers six main topics:

- River Morphology (bed forms, meandering/braiding) and sedimentation of navigation channels.
- Sediment transport i flowing water and in combined waves and current (the coastal zone).
- Coastal morphology: Dynamics of bars, longshore undulations; long- and cross shore sediment transport in coastal zones.
- Wave boundary layers.
- Erosion around offshore structures.
- Forces on and vibration of offshore structures such as pipelines and wind turbine towers.

Invited review papers. Research papers.

== Books ==
- The Mechanics of Scour in the Marin Environment
- Hydrodynamics Around Cylindrical Structures
- Mechanics of Coastal Sediment Transport
- Hydrodynamics

== Other research activities ==
- Coordinator of SASME-Surf and swash zone mechanics (EU-funded) and several frame research programs financed by Danish Technical Research Council.
- Chairman (with prof. Seminara) for Euromech 215 "Sediment transport in the Marin and Fluvial Environment" and (with Prof. Foti) Euromech 251 "Sea Wave Boundary Layer".

== Other ==
- Member of the council, the Danish Academy of Technical Sciences (ATV) 1996–2000.
- Institute Director ISVA (Institute of Hydrodynamics and Hydraulic Engineering), DTU (Technical University of Denmark) 1996–2000.
- Next to his university job, he worked as a consultant for many Danish Consulting companies, especially DHI and LICengineering Ltd both specialized in Hydraulic Engineering. In addition he has worked for the Danish Coastal Authority, for the World Bank (China and Bangladesh) and for public authorities in US, Ireland and Iceland. Latest he had a two-year employment 2017–2020 in India (related to Indus, Ganges and Brahmaputra rivers).
