= Tieschen =

- Municipality
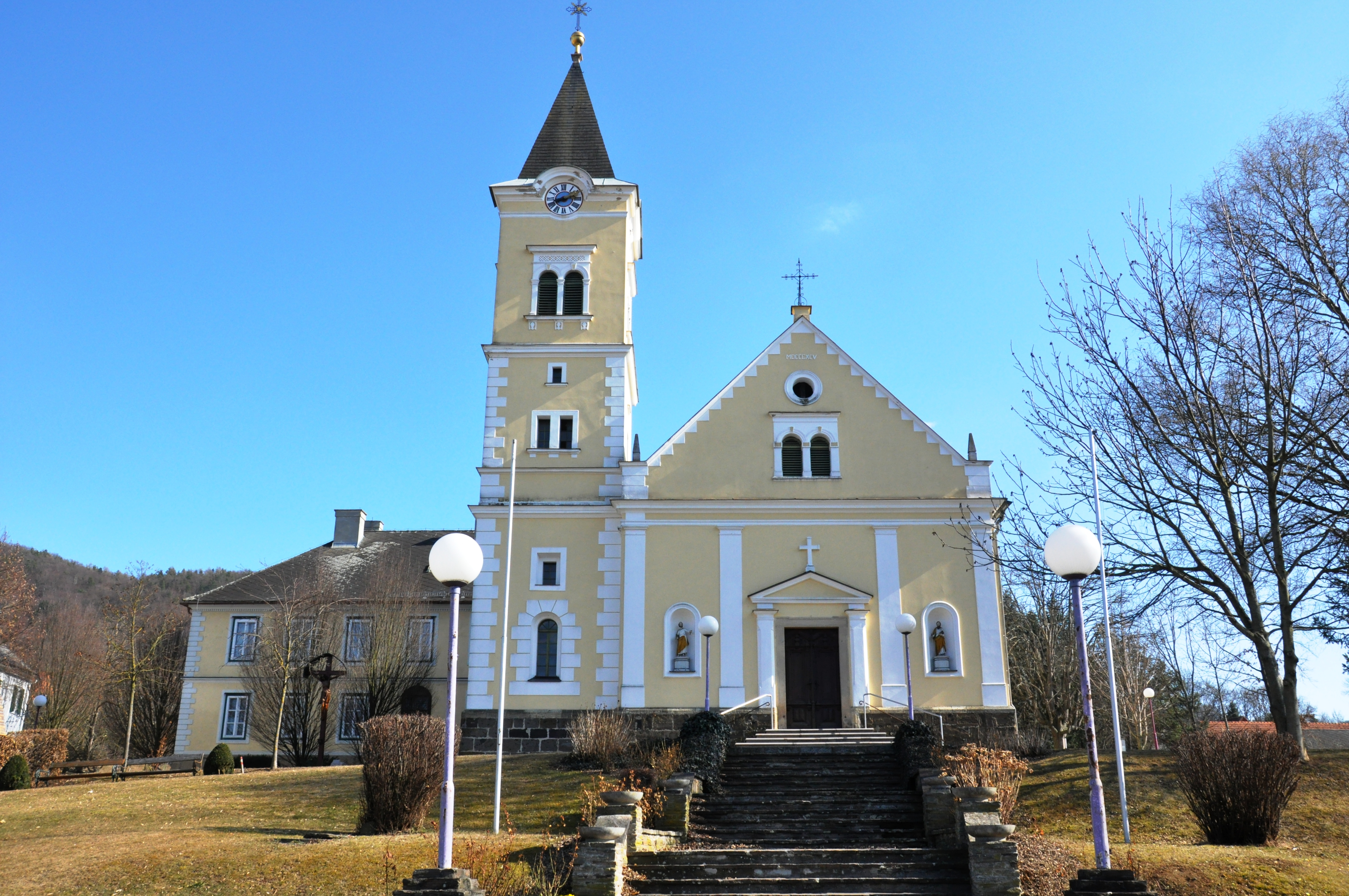
- Tieschen parish church

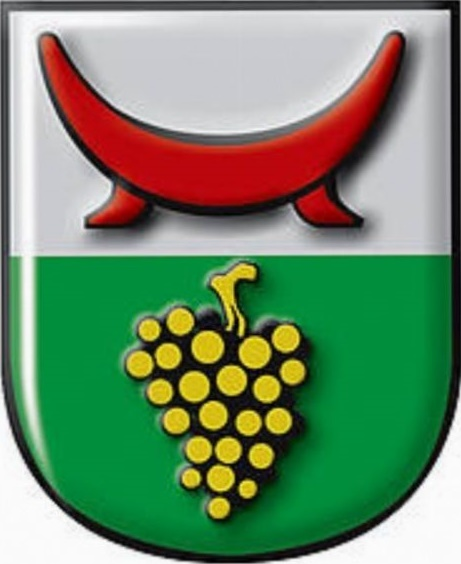
- Coat of arms

- Location within Austria
- Coordinates: 46°47′11″N 15°56′41″E
- Country: Austria
- State: Styria
- District: Südoststeiermark

Government
  - Mayor: Martin Weber (SPÖ)

Area
  - Total: 18.09 km^{2} (6.98 sq mi)
- Elevation: 260 m (850 ft)

Population (2018-01-01)
  - Total: 1,260
  - Density: 69.7/km^{2} (180/sq mi)
- Time zone: UTC+1 (CET)
  - Summer (DST): UTC+2 (CEST)
- Postal code: 8355
- Area code: 03475
- Vehicle registration: RA
- Website: www.tieschen.gv.at

Tieschen is a municipality in the district of Südoststeiermark in the Austrian state of Styria.

== Population ==
Historical population
Year	Pop.	±%
1869	1,611	—
1880	1,582	−1.8%
1890	1,655	+4.6%
1900	1,618	−2.2%
1910	1,654	+2.2%
1923	1,656	+0.1%
1934	1,641	−0.9%
1939	1,584	−3.5%
1951	1,589	+0.3%
1961	1,478	−7.0%
1971	1,461	−1.2%
1981	1,480	+1.3%
1991	1,381	−6.7%
2001	1,369	−0.9%
2012	1,317	−3.8%

== See also ==
- Jörgen
