= Emil Bemström =

Swedish ice hockey player (born 1999)

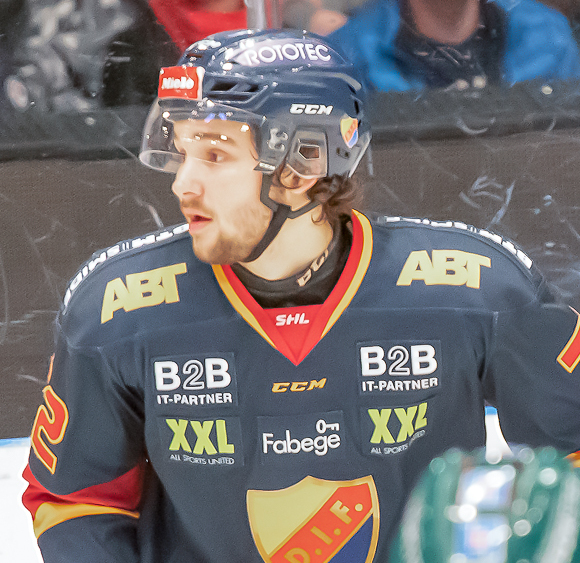
- Bemström with Djurgårdens IF in 2019
- Born: 1 June 1999 (age 27) Luleå, Sweden
- Height: 6 ft 0 in (183 cm)
- Weight: 190 lb (86 kg; 13 st 8 lb)
- Position: Forward
- Shoots: Right
- NL team Former teams: SC Bern; Leksands IF; Djurgårdens IF; HIFK; Columbus Blue Jackets; Pittsburgh Penguins
- National team: Sweden
- NHL draft: 117th overall, 2017; Columbus Blue Jackets
- Playing career: 2017–present

Emil Bemström (born 1 June 1999) is a Swedish professional ice hockey forward who is currently playing for SC Bern of the Swiss National League (NL). He previously played for the Columbus Blue Jackets and Pittsburgh Penguins of the National Hockey League (NHL). He was selected in the fourth round, 117th overall, in the 2017 NHL entry draft by the Columbus Blue Jackets.

== Playing career ==
=== Sweden ===
Bemström grew up in Trosa and started playing ice hockey in Järna SK. Bemström played as a youth within the Leksands IF organization. He made his professional debut in the 2016–17 season, appearing scoreless in five Swedish Hockey League (SHL) games. However, during the season he suffered an inflammation of the pericardium and was forced out of the lineup for two months. Following relegation to the HockeyAllsvenskan for the 2017–18 season, Bemström notched 8 goals and 15 points in 33 games for Leksands IF. He scored his first goal in the Allsvenskan in a 3–1 win over IK Oskarshamn in October 2017. Bemström left the club in the off-season and returned to the SHL by agreeing to a two-year contract with Djurgårdens IF on 2 May 2018.

In the 2018–19 season, Bemström scored his first SHL goal in the first game of the season against Frölunda HC on 15 September 2018. In a breakout season with Djurgården, he led the league in goals and power play goals and captured Rookie of the Year honours and also won the scoring title for the 2018–19 regular season with 23 goals. At the conclusion of the 2018–19 season, Bemström was also named junior player of the year by the Swedish ice hockey journalist association. Djurgården also made it to the championship round in the playoffs, led by Bemstrom who had five goals and ten points.

=== North America ===
Bemström was selected by the Columbus Blue Jackets of the National Hockey League (NHL) in the fourth round, 117th overall, of the 2017 NHL entry draft. On 15 May 2019, Bemström was signed by the Blue Jackets to a three-year, entry-level contract. Bemström made the Blue Jackets out of training camp and was expected to help cover for the loss of Artemi Panarin in the offseason. He finished his rookie season scoring ten goals and 20 points in 56 games.

With the following 2020–21 season delayed due to the COVID-19 pandemic, Bemström opted to continue playing in Europe after accepting a loan assignment from the Blue Jackets to play with Finnish club, HIFK of the Liiga, on 8 September 2020. In 16 games with HIFK, Bemström displayed his offensive acumen in compiling 8 goals and 17 points before returning to the Blue Jackets organization for training camp. Upon his return, his play struggled and he scored only three goals that season. All three goals came in Bemström's first career NHL hat trick against Juuse Saros and the Nashville Predators on 3 May 2021.

During the 2021–22 season, Bemström suffered an oblique strain in training camp and continued to struggle upon his return. He finished the season with six goals and 11 points in 41 games in the shortened season. In the offseason, Bemström signed a two-year contract extension with the Blue Jackets on 3 August 2022. He began the 2022–23 season assigned to Columbus' American Hockey League (AHL) affiliate, the Cleveland Monsters. He led the league in scoring before being recalled by the Blue Jackets on 7 November. Despite playing on the top two lines, he continued to struggle and was eventually shifted down the lineup to the bottom lines before being sent back to Cleveland on 25 November. He was recalled again on 28 December on an emergency basis replacing an ill Patrick Laine. He remained with the team and scored a career-high 22 points in 55 games with the Blue Jackets. Bemström began the 2023–24 season with the Blue Jackets, appearing in 12 games, scoring three goals and four points. However, on 15 November 2023, he was placed on waivers. He went unclaimed and on 16 November, he was assigned to Cleveland.

Unable to cement a full-time role within the Blue Jackets forward group, Bemström was traded to the Pittsburgh Penguins in exchange for forward Alexander Nylander and a conditional 2026 sixth-round pick on 23 February 2024. Bemström scored on his debut with the Penguins, notching a power play marker in a 7–6 victory over the Philadelphia Flyers on 25 February 2024. He appeared in 24 games with Pittsburgh, scoring three goals and five points. He failed to make Pittsburgh's roster for the 2024–25 season and after going unclaimed on waivers, was assigned to their AHL affiliate, the Wilkes-Barre/Scranton Penguins. He appeared in 48 games with Wilkes-Barre/Scranton, scoring 23 goals and 48 points. On 25 January 2025, Bemström was selected to play in the 2025 AHL All-Star Classic representing Wilkes-Barre/Scranton. He was recalled by Pittsburgh on 7 February to replace the injured Sidney Crosby and appeared in two games, going scoreless before being returned to the AHL on 22 February. He was recalled later that month on 27 February to replace the injured Michael Bunting. He was placed on waivers on 31 March and after clearing, was assigned to the AHL. He was recalled once more in April before being returned to Wilkes-Barre/Scranton for the final time on 12 April. He finished the NHL season with one assist in 14 games with Pittsburgh. Following the season, Bemström did not receive a qualifying offer from the Penguins and became an unrestricted free agent.

=== Return to Europe ===
It was announced on 12 August 2025 that Bemström had signed a one-year contract with SC Bern of the Swiss National League ahead of the 2025–26 season.

== International play ==
Bemström played for Sweden's junior team at the Ivan Hlinka Memorial Tournament in August 2016. He was again invited to Sweden's junior team at the 2019 World Juniors. He played for the senior team at the 2022 IIHF World Championship.

== Personal life ==
Emil's father, Jörgen Bemström, played 517 SHL (then Elitserien) games and five games for Sweden men's national ice hockey team.

== Career statistics ==
=== Regular season and playoffs ===
			Regular season					Playoffs
Season	Team	League	GP	G	A	Pts	PIM	GP	G	A	Pts	PIM
2015–16	Leksands IF	J20	5	0	0	0	2	—	—	—	—	—
2016–17	Leksands IF	J20	28	21	12	33	35	3	0	0	0	0
2016–17	Leksands IF	SHL	5	0	0	0	0	—	—	—	—	—
2017–18	Leksands IF	Allsv	33	8	7	15	33	—	—	—	—	—
2017–18	Leksands IF	J20	18	12	13	25	12	—	—	—	—	—
2018–19	Djurgårdens IF	SHL	47	23	12	35	8	19	5	5	10	2
2019–20	Columbus Blue Jackets	NHL	56	10	10	20	8	5	0	0	0	2
2020–21	HIFK	Liiga	16	8	9	17	2	—	—	—	—	—
2020–21	Columbus Blue Jackets	NHL	20	3	2	5	0	—	—	—	—	—
2021–22	Cleveland Monsters	AHL	4	2	0	2	2	—	—	—	—	—
2021–22	Columbus Blue Jackets	NHL	41	6	5	11	4	—	—	—	—	—
2022–23	Cleveland Monsters	AHL	21	14	17	31	4	—	—	—	—	—
2022–23	Columbus Blue Jackets	NHL	55	7	15	22	6	—	—	—	—	—
2023–24	Columbus Blue Jackets	NHL	32	5	6	11	10	—	—	—	—	—
2023–24	Cleveland Monsters	AHL	8	10	4	14	6	—	—	—	—	—
2023–24	Pittsburgh Penguins	NHL	24	3	2	5	2	—	—	—	—	—
2024–25	Wilkes-Barre/Scranton Penguins	AHL	48	23	25	48	38	—	—	—	—	—
2024–25	Pittsburgh Penguins	NHL	14	0	1	1	0	—	—	—	—	—
SHL totals			52	23	12	35	8	19	5	5	10	2
NHL totals			242	34	41	75	30	5	0	0	0	2

=== International ===
Year	Team	Event	Result	GP	G	A	Pts	PIM
2016	Sweden	IH18	4th	5	1	1	2	0
2017	Sweden	U18	4th	7	1	1	2	2
2019	Sweden	WJC	5th	5	4	2	6	20
2022	Sweden	WC	6th	8	1	4	5	0
Junior totals				17	6	4	10	22
Senior totals				8	1	4	5	0

== Awards and honours ==
Award	Year
SHL
Rookie of the Year	2019
Swedish junior player of the year	2019
Håkan Loob Trophy	2019

Awards and achievements
Preceded by Elias Pettersson	Winner of the SHL Rookie of the Year award 2019	Succeeded by Jesper Frödén
