= Egil Tynæs =

Norwegian doctor and activist (1941–2004)

Egil Kristian Tynæs (12 August 1941 – 2 June 2004) was a Norwegian anthroposophical doctor, senior physician at the Municipal Clinic in Bergen and a humanitarian aid worker. On 2 June 2004, in Badghis, Afghanistan Tynæs and four others (Afghans Fasil Ahmad and Besmillah, Belgian Helene de Beir, and Dutchman Willem Kwint) were killed in an ambush whilst working for the humanitarian organization Médecins Sans Frontières.

Tynæs worked in his everyday life as a senior doctor at the Municipal Polyclinic in Bergen, Norway. He undertook two assignments for Médecins Sans Frontières. He worked for MSF-Switzerland in 2002 in Baharak, Afghanistan and in 2004 for MSF-Netherlands in Badghis. There, he worked on a tuberculosis project and trained local medical staff. He was killed on the final date of his assignment.

== Early years and study ==
Egil was born in Lillehammer in 1941. His parents had fled Germany when the conditions for anthroposophical activity and its medical education became worse and worse and eventually ended by being forbidden altogether. As his father came from Germany, he was forced into military service on the Eastern Front where he met his death in Ukraine in 1943. He abstained from fleeing to Sweden for of fear of reprisals against his remaining family in Germany.

After the war Egil and his mother, Sissi Tynæs, moved from Lillehammer to Bergen, where she became one of the pillars and pioneers of Rudolf Steiner work in the town. Jörgen Smit was both Egil's godfather and class teacher at the Rudolf Steiner School in Bergen.

Egil went to high school in Bergen. He had decided early in life to become a physician and studied, in Münster, Germany, where he qualified as a doctor in 1970. During the time of his studies he also gained experience working on a biodynamic farm and a Camphill community in Wales. Thereafter he did his housemanship in the anaesthesiology department at Aarhus University Hospital and at Amtssygehus in Skanderborg, Denmark. It was in Denmark that he met his wife Kirsten and started a family of three children together with her in addition to becoming stepfather to her two oldest daughters.

His interest in anthroposophical medicine, however, led him to the surgical department of the Gemeinnützige Gemeinschaftskrankenhaus, Herdecke, a hospital that had been founded and developed to create an academic university environment where the contributions of spiritual science to the art of healing should be integrated and developed. The central force in this work was MD. Dr Gerhard Kienle. Here Egil fell ill with tuberculosis which forced him to resign after two years of work.

== His work in Norway ==
The family moved to Bergen, where Egil set up a practice as a GP in 1978, practicing anthroposophic medicine. At the beginning of the 1980s, this was extended to include a therapeuticum in which anthroposophical therapists were active. In addition, he was the school physician at the Waldorf School in Bergen and was connected also to Rostadheimen, an educational institution for Special Needs.

In the early 90s he and Kirsten traveled for a year to Georgia to assist Georgian colleagues in the development of a therapeutic centre. Here again he fell ill with tuberculosis, which caused him to close his general practice in Bergen, qualify as a specialist in internal medicine and take up a post as senior doctor at Bergen's municipal outdoor clinic, where he ran its emergency department.

Egil and Kirsten kept an open house where they also organized study groups in anthroposophic medicine. He was one of the initiators of the foundation of the Norwegian Association for anthroposophic medicine (NLFAM), supporting the younger generation of doctors in understanding anthroposophic medicine.

== Mission and death in Afghanistan ==
As a 62-year-old grandfather, Egil Tynæs chose to work in Afghanistan twice in two years. The report of Médecins Sans Frontières (MSF) in 2003, with whom he volunteered, states “Afghanistan is neither safe nor stable”; humanitarian agencies' cars have been “held up and shot at.” In March 2003, Red Cross engineer Ricardo Munguia was murdered by gunmen after they stopped the car he was travelling in.

However, MSF identified Afghanistan as the place with the greatest need for Dr Tynæs's skills, especially in treating tuberculosis. He felt it was the right thing to do and wrote: “those of us who live in the wealthy part of the world have a certain responsibility to people who live in poverty and are disadvantaged." He understood the situation having spent five months in Baharak in Afghanistan in 2002 with the Swiss branch of MSF.

There was a sense of trust that Egil was able to build with patients and the local population in spite of the cultural and linguistic differences. He was double the age of any other member of the team, his grey hair and beard familiar and reassuring in meetings with village elders.

After serving with MSF Switzerland's mission in Baharak, a town in northern Afghanistan, he returned in 2003 and helped build MSF in Norway while awaiting his next assignment. It came nearly a year later. It was Afghanistan again, this time the Badghis region in the North-west. The Dutch branch of MSF needed him to lead a local tuberculosis programme, carry out general medical duties and to train local medical staff in basic primary health clinics. By June 2004 the MSF team in Badghis had built up the polyclinic to deal with more than 1000 consultations a month. The TB programme was treating 45 patients and expanding and a mother and baby clinic had opened.

The mission having come to an end, Dr Tynæs and his team appeared happy at having achieved their goal. The next day, on a road near the polyclinic in Khairkhana, the land cruiser in which they were travelling was ambushed with gunfire and grenades killing Dr Tynæs and four other MSF staff.
