= Fragolino =

Italian sparkling red wine

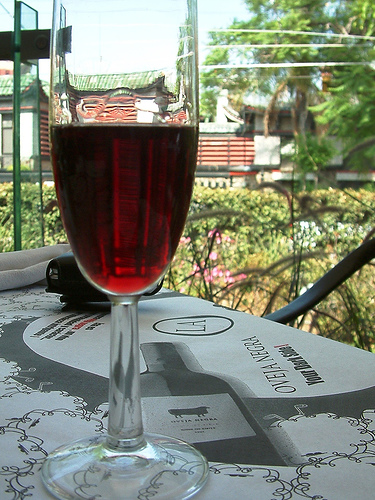
A chalice of fragolino

Fragolino is an alcoholic beverage obtained by the fermentation of Vitis labrusca grapes and its hybrids.

The name fragolino literally means "small strawberry", a term used because the wine has a distinctive musky, grapey aroma often described as "foxy" caused by the presence of methyl anthranilate.

The term is used almost exclusively in Italy, typically referring to drinks made by fermenting grapes of the Isabella variety, but it is also locally used to refer to other wines made with labrusca, such as uhudler or certain american wines.

In Italy, fragolino is mainly produced in the regions of veneto and friuli, but it is not uncommon to find in other regions. In the region Campania, the name fragolino is used to refer to a liquor infused with strawberries.

== European legislation and commercialization ==
According to European legislation, fragolino is illegal to sell, but personal consumption remains completely legal. It is possible to find products labeled as "fragolino" in Italian markets, those are generally perfectly legal beverages obtained by flavoring fermented European grape varieties with artificial or natural flavors to emulate the taste of fragolino. Legally, such beverages cannot be classified as wine.

Outside of Italy, uhudler wine has a protected status in Austria and is thus fully legal to sell.

== Cultural status of fragolino ==
Despite the legal hurdles, fragolino wine is widely consumed and appreciated in Italy because of its sweet, refreshing taste and its aroma. The wine remains generally unpopular amongst wine connoseurs.
