= Neuromodulation (disambiguation) =

Neuromodulation is the physiological process by which a given neuron uses one or more chemicals to regulate diverse populations of neurons.

Neuromodulation may also refer to:

- Neuromodulation (medicine), the alteration of nerve activity through targeted delivery of a stimulus to specific neurological sites in the body
- Neuromodulation (journal), a medical journal
