= Jørgen Carling =

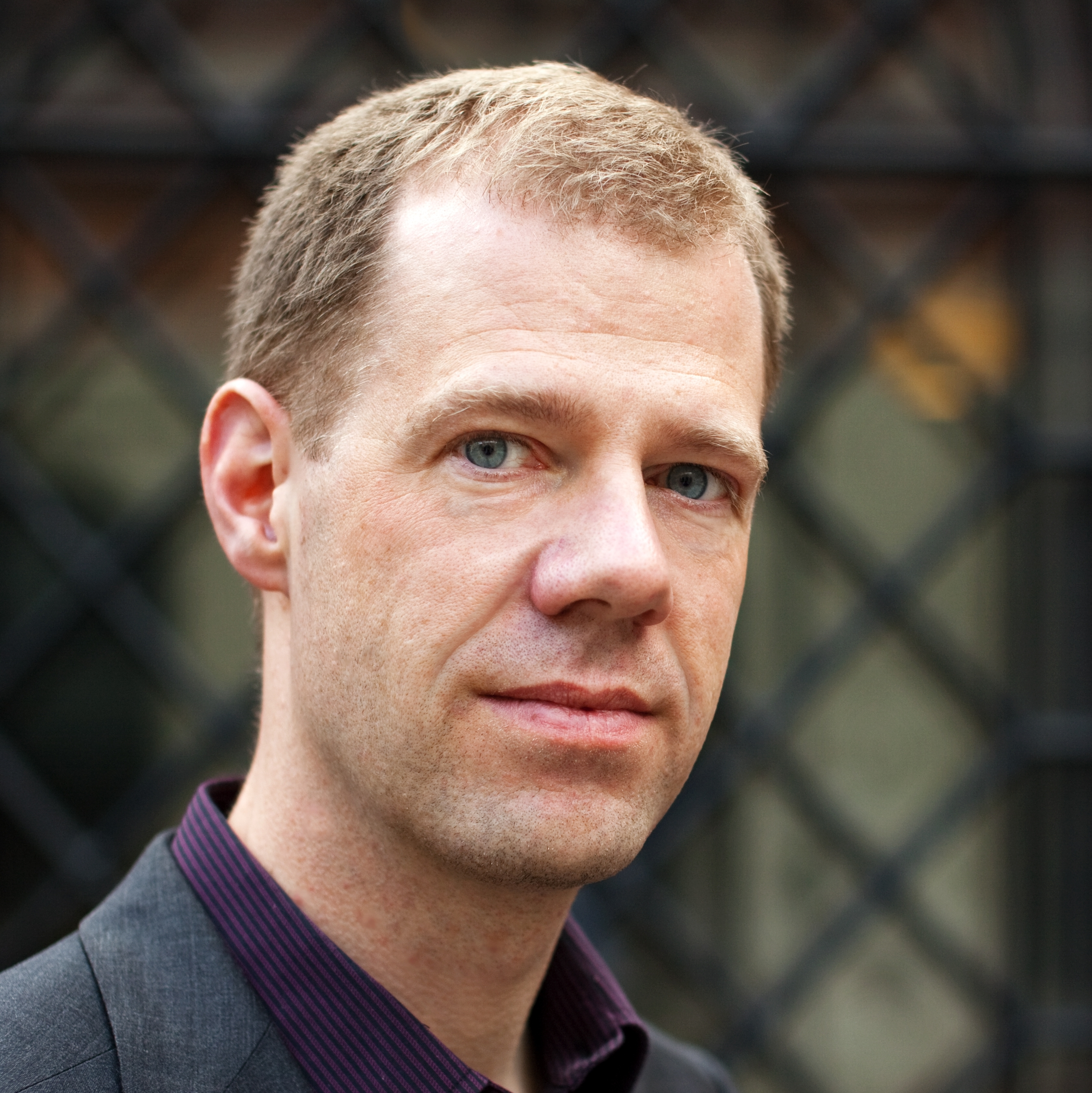
Jørgen Carling (Peace Research Institute Oslo, 2010)

Jørgen Carling (born 11 November 1974, in Oslo) is a Norwegian researcher specializing on international migration. He holds a PhD in Human Geography from the University of Oslo and is research professor of Migration and Transnationalism Studies. Carling has worked at the Peace Research Institute Oslo (PRIO) since 2002, where he has been Research Director since 2012.

== Biography ==
Jørgen Carling grew up in Oslo where he attended Oslo Waldorf School (1981–1990) and Oslo Cathedral School (1990–1991). He obtained the International Baccalaureate from the United World College of the Atlantic (1991–1993) and pursued undergraduate studies in Japanese, Human Geography, Demography and Economics at the University of Oslo (1994–1999) before obtaining a master's degree (2001) and PhD (2007) in Human Geography at the same university. His doctoral research was carried out at the Peace Research Institute Oslo (PRIO), under the supervision of Nicholas Van Hear (University of Oxford) and Stein Tønnesson (PRIO). Carling has been a visiting scholar at the Netherlands Interdisciplinary Demographic Institute (2003), the Centre on Migration, Policy and Society at the University of Oxford (2005) and the Asia Research Institute at the National University of Singapore.

Jørgen Carling is the son of Finn Carling and Anne Carling and the grandson of Petter Mørch Koren. He is married to Heidi Østbø Haugen and lives in Oslo.

== Research ==
Carling's research covers migration aspirations, migration processes and migrants’ transnational connections with their countries of origin. He has done extensive research on migrant remittances, both academic and policy oriented. Carling is known for coining the term “involuntary immobility” to describe the situation of people who wish to migrate to another country but are prevented from doing so by restrictive immigration policies. He has done fieldwork on migration and transnationalism in Cape Verde and among Cape Verdeans in the Netherlands and Italy. Carling's work on Cape Verde has sought to use a society infused with migration experiences to learn about more general migration processes. The New York Times described it in the following terms: “If Cape Verde is the Galapagos of migration, Jorgen Carling, a Norwegian geographer, is its Darwin.” His study on Chinese migration to Cape Verde, conducted together with his wife Heidi Østbø Haugen, was an early and widely cited contribution to the study of China's renewed presence across Africa.

== Select Bibliography ==
- Batalha, Luís & Jørgen Carling, eds, 2008. Transnational Archipelago. Perspectives on Cape Verdean Migration and Diaspora. Amsterdam. ISBN 978-90-5356-994-8
- Carling, Jørgen, 2008. 'The Determinants of Migrant Remittances', Oxford Review of Economic Policy 24(3): 582–599.
- Carling, Jørgen, 2008. 'The Human Dynamics of Migrant Transnationalism', Ethnic and Racial Studies 31(8): 1452–1477.
- Carling, Jørgen, 2007. 'Migration Control and Migrant Fatalities at the Spanish-African Borders', International Migration Review 41(2): 316–343.
- Haugen, Heidi Østbø & Jørgen Carling, 2005. 'On the Edge of the Chinese Diaspora: The Surge of Baihuo Business in an African City', Ethnic and Racial Studies 28(4): 639–662.
- Carling, Jørgen, 2002. 'Migration in the age of involuntary immobility: Theoretical reflections and Cape Verdean experiences', Journal of Ethnic and Migration Studies 28(1): 5–42.
