= Modulation (European Union) =

As part of its Agenda 2000 reforms, and effective 1 January 2000, EU member-countries may reduce (or modulate) direct aid to producers (by a maximum of 20%) in cases where:

- the labour employed in a farm falls below a threshold set by national authorities;
- the overall prosperity of the holding is above a certain limit;
- and, the total payments granted under support programs exceed a limit set by national authorities.

The savings that result and those from cross-compliance or econ-conditionality (observance of environmental criteria) may be used by the member countries to supplement EU funding for early retirement measures, payments for less favoured areas and areas subject to environmental restrictions, agri-environmental provisions, afforestation and rural development.

Modulation is an essential element of the EU Commission's Mid-term Review (MTR) proposals. Funds acquired from the reduction of payments to farms will be allocated to rural development under the MTR.
