= Jørgen Berner Thrap =

Norwegian judge (1898–1990)

Jørgen Berner Thrap (1898 – 1990) was a Norwegian judge.

He was born in Kristiania as the son of a civil servant. He finished his secondary education in 1916, and graduated with the cand.jur. degree in 1921. After two years as a deputy judge he was hired as a secretary in the Norwegian Ministry of Justice and the Police. He was then a police superintendent in Oslo from 1927 to 1936 and district stipendiary magistrate in Lofoten from 1936 to 1945. Then, after one year working with the legal purge in Norway after World War II he was named as a Supreme Court Justice in 1946. He stood in this position until his retirement in 1968.

From 1954 to 1956 he chaired the public price council. In 1962 he was decorated as a Knight, First Class of the Royal Norwegian Order of St. Olav. He resided at Hvalstad, and died in 1990.
