= Jörgen Düberg =

Swedish actor (born 1956)

- Born: Carl Adam Jörgen Düberg; July 9, 1956 (age 69)
- Occupation: Actor
- Father: Axel Düberg

Carl Adam Jörgen Düberg, born 9 July 1956 in Limhamn, Malmö, is a Swedish actor. He is the son of Axel Düberg, also an actor.

Düberg graduated from the Swedish National Academy of Mime and Acting in Stockholm in 1980. He has been with the Helsingborg City Theatre's permanent ensemble since 1992.

== Filmography ==
=== Films ===
Year	Title	Notes
1967	The Jungle Book	voice
1986	The Great Mouse Detective	voice
1988	The New Adventures of Pippi Longstocking	
1990	The Little Mermaid	voice
1998	Beck – The Money Man	TV-film as Gavling (young)
2004	Fjorton suger	as father

=== Television ===
Year	Title	Notes
1972	Stora skälvan	as Johan
1985	Lösa förbindelser	as Hasse
1986	Sammansvärjningen	as Järta
2002	Den 5:e kvinnan	1 episode "Unge Holger Eriksson" as himself
2009	The Protectors	1 episode "Del 10" (part 10) as Smidt MI5

== Theater ==
=== Selected roles ===
- 2015 – Den stressade by Ludvig Holberg, directed by Jan Hertz, Fredriksdalsteatern
