= B. Mutlu Sumer =

Turkish scientist and engineer (born 1945)

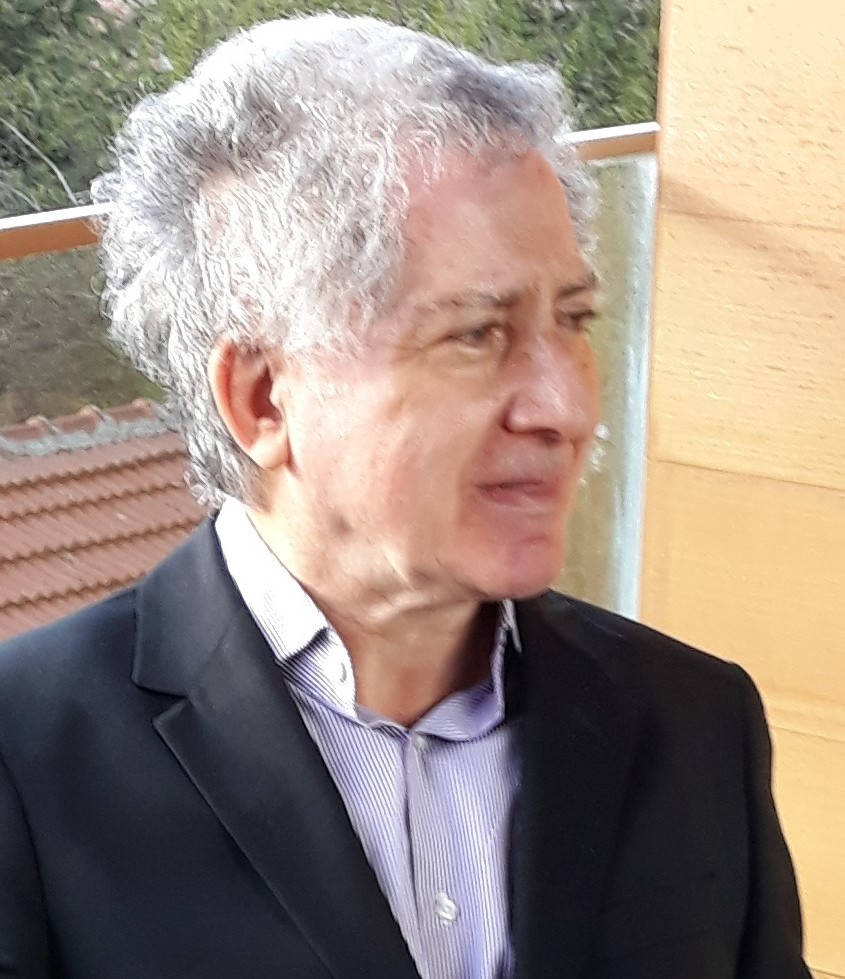
- Born: November 15, 1945 (age 80); Malatya, Turkey
- Education: Istanbul Technical University (Masters and PhD), University of Cambridge (Postdoc)
- Known for: Hydrodynamic forces on and hydroelastic vibrations of marine structures including pipelines and wind turbine towers; Scour and scour protection around marine structures including offshore wind farms; Liquefaction (wave-induced and seismic-induced) around marine structures; Turbulence in coastal and civil engineering including wave boundary layers
- Spouse: Tijen Sumer
- Awards: BEETECH Awards (2019); ASCE COPRI Certificate of Appreciation (2018); ICCE Award (2016); ICSE Best Paper Award (2014); ASCE JWPCOE Outstanding Paper Designation (2013); ASCE COPRI Certificate of Appreciation (2008); Karl Emil Hilgard Hydraulic Prize (2005); ISOPE Best Paper Award (1992); TUBITAK Science Award (1991); TUBITAK Support Award (1976); NATO Post-Doctoral Fellowship (1971-72); IMO Hydraulic Structure Award (1971)
- Scientific career
- Fields: Coastal engineering; Offshore engineering; Hydraulics; Marine Hydro-geomechanics
- Workplaces: Istanbul Technical University; University of Cambridge; Technical University of Denmark

B. Mutlu Sumer (born 15 November 1945) is a Turkish scientist and engineer known for his studies on seabed and structure interaction including scour and soil liquefaction, as well as turbulence in coastal and civil engineering. He was previously Professor at the Technical University of Denmark (Department of Mechanical Engineering, Section for Fluid Mechanics, Coastal and Maritime Engineering) until he retired in 2015. He held a Professor-Emeritus position between June 2015 and June 2017 at the same university. He was Professor of Hydraulics at Istanbul Technical University before he moved to Denmark in 1984. B. Mutlu Sumer relocated to Turkey, his native country, in 2016 and, together with Professor Özgür Kirca, founded a consultancy and research company, BM SUMER Consultancy & Research, affiliated with Istanbul Technical University.

== Education ==
He graduated with MSc (1967) and PhD (1970) from Istanbul Technical University. He was a post-doctoral research fellow at University of Cambridge, UK (1971-1973).

== Research ==
His main fields of research are flow around marine structures –scour, liquefaction, hydrodynamic forces, and hydroelastic vibrations– turbulence and sediment transport, and hydrodynamics of sea straits (flow through the Bosphorus and the Golden Horn).

== Academic life ==
He has coordinated SCARCOST (Scour Around Coastal Structures) (1997-2000) and LIMAS (Liquefaction Around Marine Structures) (2001-2004), two European research programmes financed by the European Community under MAST III, and FP5 programmes, respectively. He has also coordinated EPCOAST (Exploitation and Protection of Coastal Zones), a frame research program financed by Danish Technical Research Council (2005-2008); and Seabed Wind Farm Interaction, another frame research program financed by Danish Council for Strategic Research (DSF)/Energy and Environment (2008-2012). Further to his role as coordinators of the aforementioned research programmes, he has also participated in many international (EU) and national (Danish) research programmes.

During his tenure at Technical University of Denmark (1984-2015), B. Mutlu Sumer developed courses such as Marine Structures I (forces on and vibrations of marine structures such as marine pipelines), Marine Structures II (scour around marine structures, and wave-induced liquefaction of marine soils and its impact on marine structures), and Turbulence Theory, among others, supported by his books on these subjects. He supervised 22 Ph.D. students (at Technical University of Denmark), 65 Master's students (at Technical University of Denmark), 6 Master's students (at Istanbul Technical University) and 22 visiting research associates/postdocs (at Technical University of Denmark).

Professor Sumer has published over 220 scientific papers.

He delivered many keynote addresses and invited lectures in scientific meetings, and gave lectures and seminars at universities and other academic institutions in different countries.

Professor Sumer has been acting as an Expert in a 4-year (2022-2026) research project funded by NSFC (Natural Science Funding of China) with the title “Full Scale Investigation on Pipeline Scour and Span Shoulder Migration in Seashell and Sand Mixture Seabed”. Project’s Principal Investigator is Professor Titi Sui of Hohai University, College of Harbour, Coastal and Offshore Engineering. Professor David R. Fuhrman of Technical University of Denmark is also involved as an Expert in the project. Professors Sumer’s and Fuhrman’s participations in the project have also been supported by a 2-year (2022-2024) Research Collaboration Agreement, awarded under the scheme “Foreign Talent Introduction Project from The Foreign Experts Bureau of the Ministry of Science and Technology of China.

Professor Sumer is a member of Board of Trustees of the Istanbul Technical University Development Foundation (2019-date).

== Awards and recognition ==
- BEETECH 2019 Awards. BM SUMER Consultancy & Research, the firm of which Professor Sumer is the co-founder, has been awarded by ITU ARI Teknokent with two prizes, the prize for the highest R&D turnover, and that for the highest R&D export,
- Certificate of Appreciation (2018) by the Board of Governors of the Coasts, Oceans, Ports and Rivers Institute, American Society of Civil Engineering, in Recognition of Dedication and Service as an Associate Editor of the Journal of Waterway, Port, Ocean and Coastal Engineering (2001-2018),
- ICCE 2016 Award. In recognition of contribution and dedication to Coastal Engineering and commitment to excellence, on the occasion of the 35th International Conference on Coastal Engineering (ICCE 2016),
- ICSE 2014 Best Paper Award. For the paper: T.U. Petersen, B.M. Sumer, J. Fredsøe: “Edge scour at scour protections around offshore wind turbine foundations”, presented at 7th International Conference on Scour and Erosion (ICSE), 2-4 December, 2014, Perth, Western Australia.
- 2013 Outstanding Paper designation of American Society of Civil Engineers, the Journal of Waterway, Port, Coastal and Ocean Engineering. For the paper: B.M. Sumer, T.U. Petersen, L. Locatelli, J. Fredsøe, R.E. Musumeci and E. Foti: ”Backfilling of a Scour Hole around a Pile in Waves and Current.” J. Waterway, Port, Coastal, Ocean Eng. ASCE, 139(1), 9–23, 2013.
- Certificate of Appreciation (2008). Coasts, Oceans, Ports, and Rivers Institute (COPRI), American Society of Civil Engineers.
- 2005 Karl Emil Hilgard Hydraulic Prize of American Society of Civil Engineers
- The International Society of Offshore and Polar Engineers Best Paper ISOPE Award, presented on June 17, 1992. For the paper: J. Fredsøe, B.M. Sumer and M.M. Arnskov: "Time scale for wave/current scour below pipelines", presented at the 1991 ISOPE Conference, Edinburgh, Scotland, August 1991 (also published in International J. Offshore and Polar Engineering. Vol. 2, No. 1, pp. 13-17, 1992).
- 1991 Science Award, Scientific and Technical Research Council of Turkey (TUBITAK)
- 1976 Support Award, Scientific and Technical Research Council of Turkey (TUBITAK)
- NATO Post-Doctoral Fellowship (1972-1972), University of Cambridge, UK.
- Hydraulic Structures Award (1971), Turkish Society of Civil Engineering.

== Books ==
- Hydrodynamics Around Cylindrical Structures
- The Mechanics of Scour in the Marine Environment
- Liquefaction Around Marine Structures
- Turbulence in Coastal and Civil Engineering
