= Uhudler =

Unique wine from Austria

Uhudler is a wine from Südburgenland, Austria (see Burgenland). In appearance it is often a rosé colour, but is also made as a white wine. It has intense flavours of strawberry and black currants, a characteristic taste often called "foxy" in wine parlance. The grape varieties used are highly resistant to phylloxera and other diseases; as a result they do not often have to be sprayed with pesticides. Requiring only little fertilization.

== Oenology ==
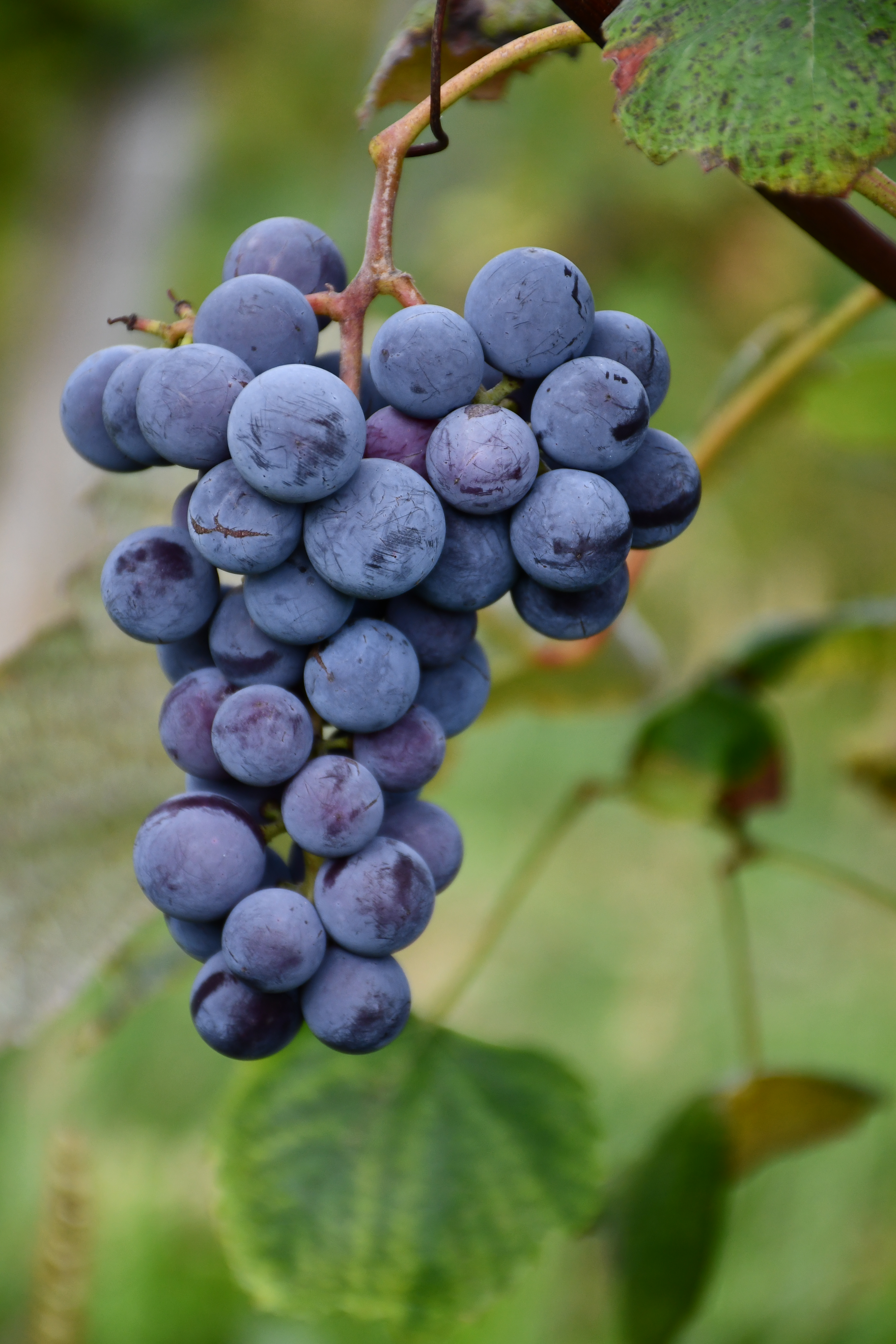
Ripatella grapes in Heiligenbrunn

The grapes/clusters are usually red, but also (less commonly) white. The varieties used are inter-specific hybrids, which were developed from crossings between the European species Vitis vinifera with the native North American Vitis labrusca and Vitis riparia. It is Vitis labrusca which lends the wine its characteristic "strawberry" flavouring.

"Uhudler" can refer to several varieties and today it is disputed which varieties rank in the "Uhudlergruppe" (Uhudler group) and which do not. Some of the varieties used include the grapes Concord, Isabella, Elvira, Clinto, Ripatella and Noah.

Some of the grapes can only be legally produced in selected towns in southern Burgenland and on an area of 40 hectares in neighbouring Styria, however the wine made from them in Styria must have a different name. But since it is essentially the same wine, similar names like Suhudler or Juhudler are used.

== History ==
Uhudler originates from the time of the large phylloxera infestations around 1860. The phylloxera aphid reached Europe in 1860 and Austria in around 1900. After the losses of the European grape varieties through phylloxera, many attempts were made to either exterminate the pest or use alternative, non-traditional viticultural practices which would prevail against infestation.

In time, disease resistant North American vines (including some used in Uhudler wines) were imported to Europe and used to produce wine. Many crossings between native North American and European varietals were created at this time. The wine produced did not correspond well to the established taste trends in Europe. During the early 20th century, however, some fruit from North American vines were blended with that from Vitis vinifera to enhance the "fruitiness" of the wine.

Map of municipalities in Burgenland which are legally allowed to produce Uhudler wine.

After the discovery that grafting Vitis Vinifera onto native North American rootstocks prevent the infestations in Europe – and in order to allow European wine to regain its place in the first half of the 20th century – North American vines (like those used in "Uhudler") were forbidden under wine regulations across the European continent. In order to damage the reputations of wines produced from native North American varietals, it was also maintained that these wines contained a high content of methanol, and therefore were injurious to the health of the drinker. By the 1970s in Austria, private drinking of the Uhudler was thus quite limited, but production for private consumption was permitted. However, prohibition led to the rising popularity of the beverage.

On the basis of the Austrian Wine Law, Uhudler can be marketed in 8 communities of Burgenland. Uhudler is made from the varieties of Concord, Delaware, Elvira und Ripatella.

Because of much stricter Austrian wine laws due to the 1985 wine scandal, Uhudler was forbidden until the early 1990s. During this time, thousand of litres of Uhudler (particularly in south Burgenland) were destroyed by wine cellar supervisors.

== See also ==
- Jörgen
- Heiligenbrunn
