= Isabella (grape) =

Variety of grape

- Grape (Vitis)
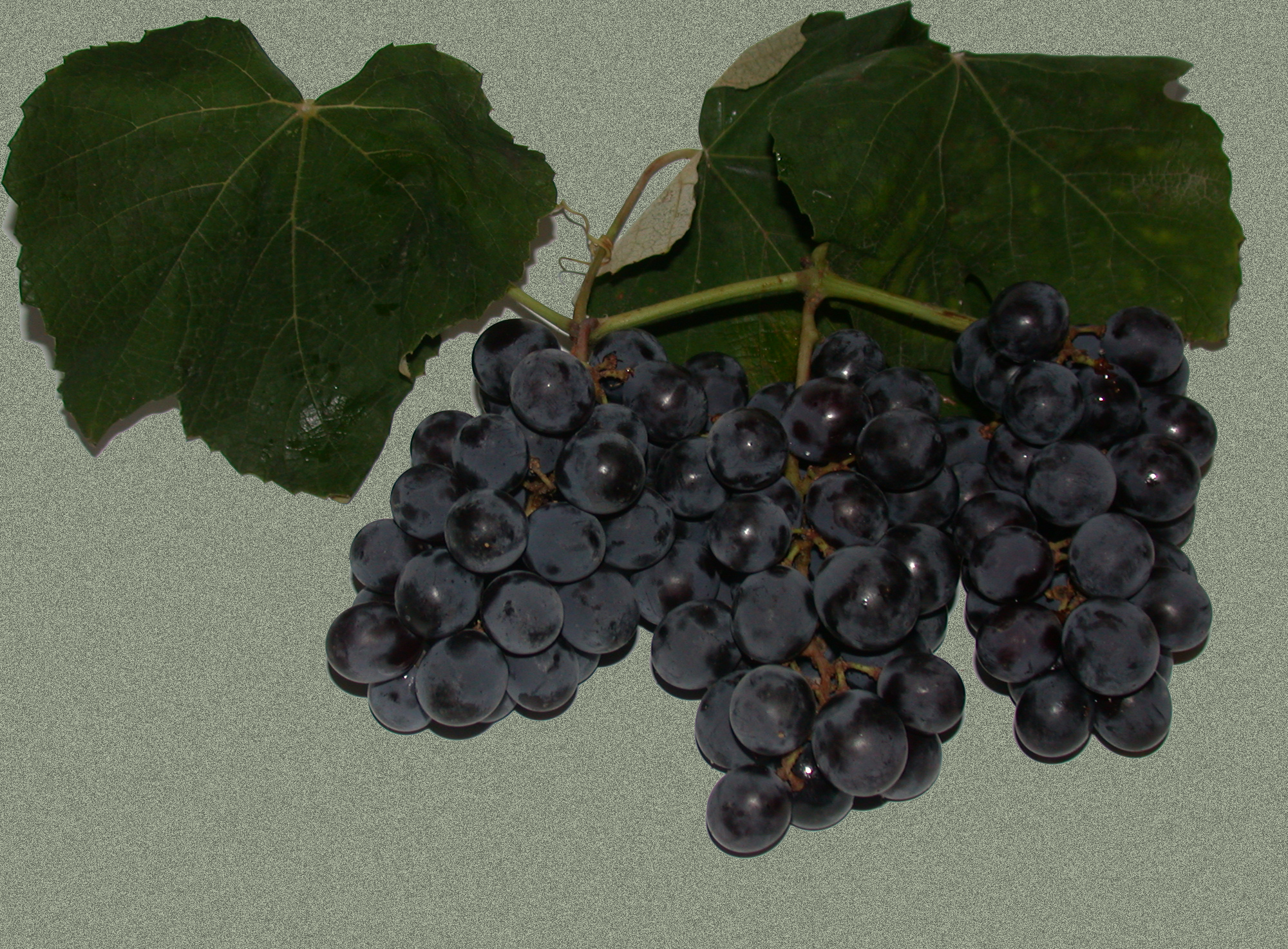
- Isabella grapes
- Color of berry skin: Noir
- Species: Vitis × labruscana
- Also called: Over 50 including; Alexander, Fragola & Izabella
- Origin: Italy
- Notable regions: former USSR, Turkey, Latin America, eastern European Union.
- Notable wines: Fragolino and Uhudler
- VIVC number: 5560

The Isabella grape is a cultivar derived from the grape species Vitis labrusca or 'fox grape,' which is used for table, juice and wine production.

== Appearance and use ==
The skin of Isabella, when ripe, is a dark purple, almost black, with a tender green-yellow flesh. It has large, well-formed fruit clusters with thick bloom. It is a slip-skin variety, meaning that the skin separates easily from the fruit. The grapes are used to make wine, most notably Uhudler and Fragolino.

== History ==
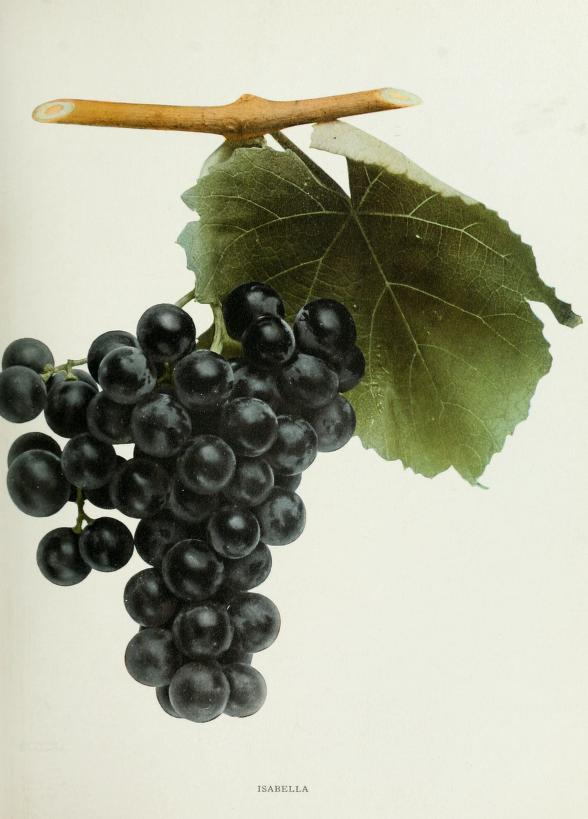
Photographic plate of Isabella grape from the book The Grapes of New York, 1908 by Ulysses Prentiss Hedrick

Isabella has long been assumed to be a hybrid of a wild Vitis labrusca x Vitis vinifera. A vinifera parentage was inferred largely because of Isabella's susceptibility to mildew and black rot. Just recently, using microsatellite DNA analysis Dr. Erika Maul's group in the Julius Kühn-Institut (JKI), Germany, confirmed the vinifera involvement in Isabella's pedigree which revealed that the vinifera parent is the very rare French (white) cultivar, Meslier petit (a.k.a. Petit Meslier). It is thought that it resulted from random pollination when European Vitis vinifera grapes were attempted to be established in America. It was popularly thought to have been discovered by a Mrs Isabella Gibbs of South Carolina in 1816. Recent microsatellite DNA evidence from Dr. Jeronimo Rodrigues' laboratory has established that the Vitis labrusca parent of the Isabella hybrid cultivar is the American-born Ives' Seedling (a.k.a. Ives or Bordô in Brazil). This surprising discovery was revealed by DNA analysis which suggested that Ives carries a null VVMD5 allele which was subsequently inherited by the Isabella hybrid, its offspring. There has been, however, conflicting information with other sources stating that it was found in Virginia, Delaware and even in Europe.

=== Modern history ===
In the western part of the European Union, Isabella is no longer a commercially important grape as it produces wines with a noticeable labrusca flavor, which is considered undesirable by many Western European connoisseurs. New plantings were banned in France after 1934. As a high yielding grape capable of withstanding tropical and semi-tropical conditions, it has been planted in Portugal, Bali, Japan, and various locations in the southern hemisphere such as in Colombia and Brazil, where it is a leading grape variety. In the U.S. it is sparsely grown in New York State. due to its phylloxera resistance and its cold hardiness. In Peru, where is locally known as "Borgoña", is widely popular as a table grape and as the source of sweet table wine.

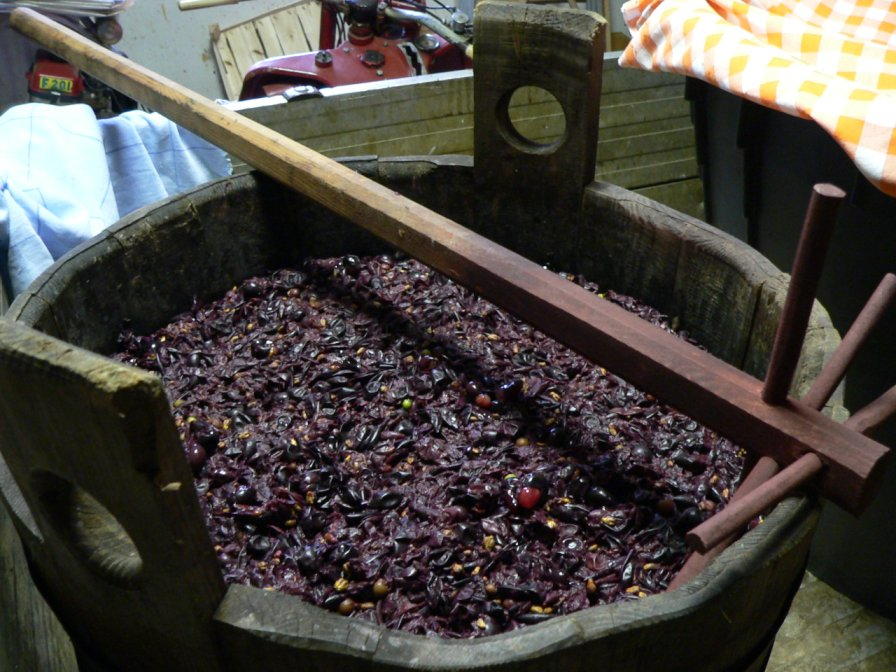
Isabella grapes must

One of the most popular grapes in the former USSR, Isabella was brought to the former Soviet nations of Georgia, Azerbaijan and Moldova from France through Odessa. For this reason this variety is also called Odessa among Georgians. Russian poet Osip Mandelstam had described Isabella as "fleshy and heavy like a cluster of night itself". Radeda, a dry red Abkhazian wine, is made from Isabella.

Isabella is also found on the south shore of the Black Sea in Turkey. The Pontic Greeks from Trabzon have used it for wine production named "zamura". The berries are known to be used for the production of Pekmez and the leaves for preparing Sarma.

The grape is also grown in Australia around Port Macquarie, from which a distinctive dessert wine style is made, and in Switzerland, in Ticino, where it is used to make grappa.

== Aliases ==
Isabella has over 100 aliases including: Albany Surprise, Alexander, Black Cape, Borgoña, Champania, Constantia, Dorchester, Fragola, Framboisier, Glippertjie, Glipdruif, Isabelle, Izabella, Odessa, Pierce, Raisin de Cassis, Moschostaphylo, Kerkyraios, Tudum and Tzortzidika., Căpșunică (Romania).
