= Holmqvist =

Holmqvist is a Swedish surname. Notable people with this surname include:

== Athletes ==
- Andreas Holmqvist (born 1981), Swedish ice hockey defenseman
- Birger Ivar Holmqvist (1900–1989), former Swedish ice hockey player who competed at the 1928 Winter Olympics
- Hans Holmqvist (born 1960), Swedish footballer
- Johan Holmqvist (born 1978), Swedish ice hockey goaltender
- Leif Holmqvist (born 1942), former Swedish ice hockey goaltender
- Michael Holmqvist (born 1979), Swedish ice hockey forward
- Hasse Holmqvist (born 1945), Swedish motorcycle speedway rider

== Arts and literature ==
- Ninni Holmqvist (born 1958), Swedish author and translator
- Stig Holmqvist (1936–2020), Swedish author and photographer

== Other fields ==
- Nils-Göran Holmqvist (born 1943), Swedish politician
- Wilhelm Holmqvist (1905–1989), Swedish archaeologist
