= Jörgen Bemström =

Swedish ice hockey player

- Born: 6 April 1974 (age 50); Södertälje, SWE
- Height: 5 ft 10 in (178 cm)
- Weight: 194 lb (88 kg; 13 st 12 lb)
- Position: Left wing
- Shot: Left
- Played for: Luleå HF; Modo Hockey; Södertälje SK
- Playing career: 1996–2009

Jörgen Bemström (born 6 April 1974) is a Swedish retired professional ice hockey player. In Elitserien Bemström played in Luleå HF, Modo Hockey and Södertälje SK. He ended his playing career in Södertälje SK in 2009, and was named the assistant coach of that team prior to the 2010–11 season. However, after Södertälje's relegation to HockeyAllsvenskan that season, he was forced to leave the club.

His son Emil currently plays for the Columbus Blue Jackets of the National Hockey League.
