= Jørgen Plaetner =

Danish composer (1930–2002)

Jørgen Plaetner (1930-2002) was a Danish electronic composer. His works were performed at the Statens Museum for Kunst in 1963.

== Works ==
Album Electronic Music on Da Capo Records

- Beta
- Modulations
- Nocturne
- The Lovers
- Figures in Water
- Hieronymus Bosch
- Sonata for Tape Recorder
- Alpha
