= Jörgen Holmquist =

Swedish diplomat (1947–2014)

Director-General Internal Market and Services, European Commission
- In office 2007–2010
- Preceded by: Alexander Schaub

Director-General Fisheries and Maritime Affairs, European Commission
- In office 2002–2006
- Succeeded by: Fokion Fotiadis

Personal details
- Born: 1 May 1947 Stockholm, Sweden
- Died: 28 March 2014 (aged 66) United States
- Spouse: Gail Rubenstein
- Education: Stockholm University

Jörgen Holmquist (1 May 1947 – 28 March 2014) was a Swedish public administrator who was the Director-General of Internal Market and Services at the European Commission, a position he held until 2010. Before his appointment to DG Internal Market and Services, he served as the Director-General of Fisheries and Maritime Affairs. He was chair of the International Ethics Standards Board for Accountants and the European Corporate Governance Institute from 2012 until his death.

== Career ==
Prior to his appointment as Director-General (DG) of Internal Market and Services, Holmquist served as the DG of Fisheries and Maritime Affair (2005–2006), DG of Fisheries (2002–2004), Deputy DG of Budget (2001–2002) and Director in DG Agriculture (1997–2001), all within the European Commission. Before joining the Commission, Holmquist served in the Swedish government. He spent most of his career in the Swedish Ministry of Finance where he dealt with economic policy and particularly public sector budgeting. His last position at the Ministry of Finance prior to leaving for the European Commission was as Budget Director (2003–2007). He also spent 7 years in Washington DC on behalf of the Ministry of Finance.
