= Jørgen Jørgensen (philatelist) =

Danish philatelist (born 1944)

Jørgen Jørgensen (born 1944) is a Danish philatelist who was appointed to the Roll of Distinguished Philatelists in 2015. Jørgensen specialises in postal history and thematic philately and is an internationally accredited philatelic judge. His display of "Mail to Foreign Destinations during the Skilling period" won a Large Gold medal at the BRASILIANA 2013 stamp exhibition.
