= Jörgen =

- Village of Tieschen
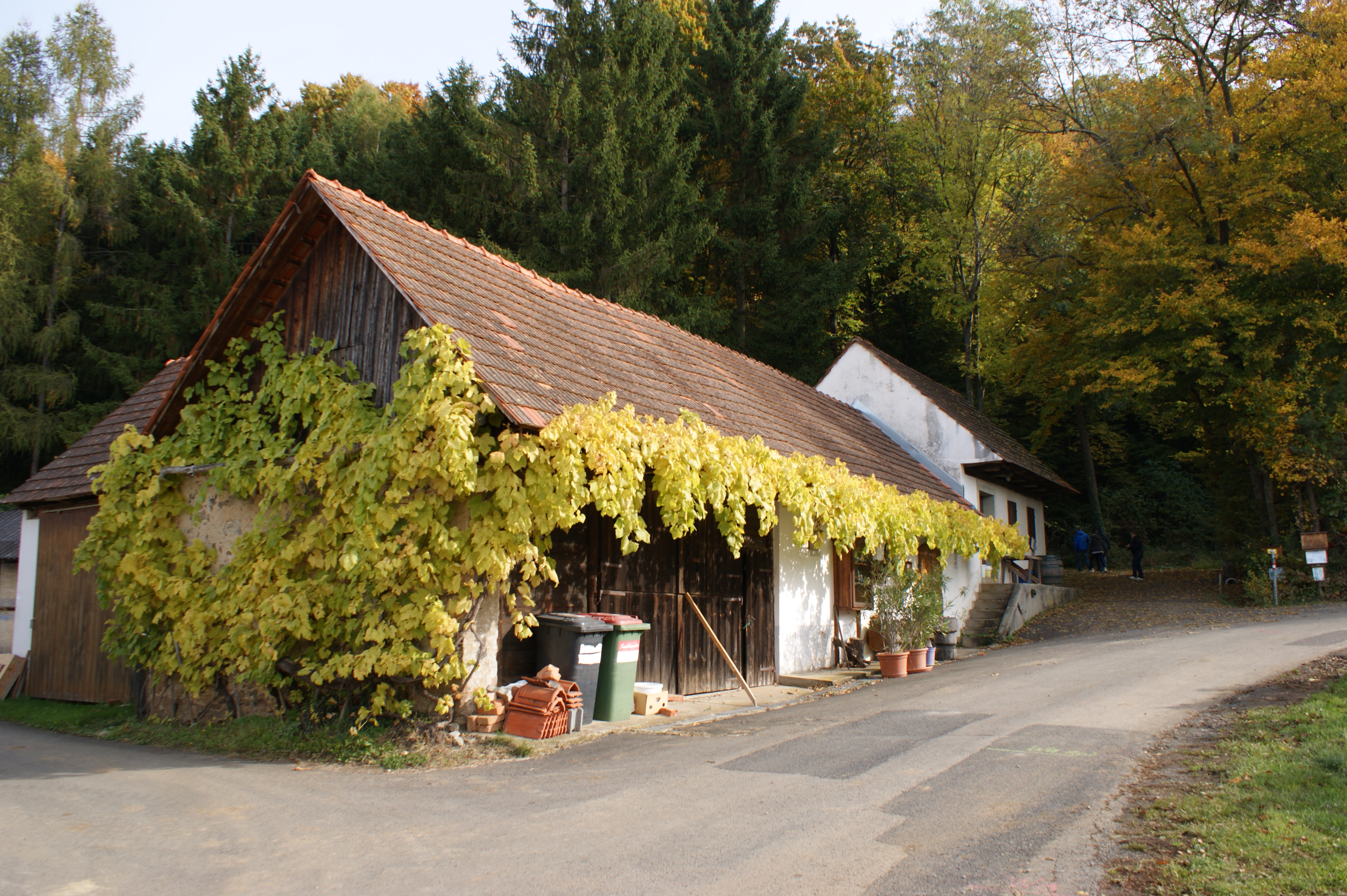

- Location within Austria
- Coordinates: 46°46′30″N 15°56′40″E
- Country: Austria
- State: Styria
- District: Südoststeiermark
- Elevation: 260 m (850 ft)

Population (2016)
  - Total: 159
- Time zone: UTC+1 (CET)
  - Summer (DST): UTC+2 (CEST)
- Postal code: 8355
- Area code: 03475

Jörgen is a village in the municipality of Tieschen in the Bezirk of Südoststeiermark in the Federal State of Styria in Austria. Its population was 159 in 2016.

Jörgen is known for its fine white wines. Next to the more common white wines, it also produces Uhudler wines in small quantities. Uhudler is a unique wine from Austria, which originates in the Burgenland region. In Jörgen the white version may often be found, whereas is in Burgenland, its appearance is often a rosé colour. It has intense flavours of strawberry and black currants, a characteristic taste often called "foxy" in wine parlance. The grape varieties used are highly resistant to phylloxera and other diseases; as a result they do not often have to be sprayed with pesticides. They also require little fertilization because of their vigorous growth.
