= Vitis × labruscana =

Scientific classification
- Kingdom: Plantae
- Clade: Tracheophytes
- Clade: Angiosperms
- Clade: Eudicots
- Clade: Rosids
- Order: Vitales
- Family: Vitaceae
- Genus: Vitis
- Species: V. × labruscana

Binomial name
- Vitis × labruscana L.H.Bailey

Variety of grape

Vitis × labruscana is a subgroup of grapes originating from a hybridization of Vitis labrusca and Vitis vinifera. Popular examples include Concord and Niagara grapes, which comprise nearly all grapes processed for juice or jelly in the United States. Such cultivars are frequently referred to as "labrusca", however many are as little as half Vitis labrusca in their pedigree. Another common term, arguably more accurate, is "labrusca-type". These varieties do in fact possess many of the traits of Vitis labrusca, frequently including slipskin fruit, strong "foxy" flavor/odor, and large leaves with lighter colored and pubescent undersides. Most are self-fertile, unlike wild Vitis labrusca.

For much of the history of American viticulture, such varieties made up the bulk of production, particularly outside of California. In more recent years, however, the introduction of chemical pesticides and the development of rootstocks able to tolerate phylloxera have reduced their importance considerably in favor of Vitis vinifera. Nonetheless, such cultivars, particularly Concord, remain a significant and vital part of the North American and Japanese grape industries.
