= Jörgen Smit =

Norwegian educator and anthroposophist (1916–1991)

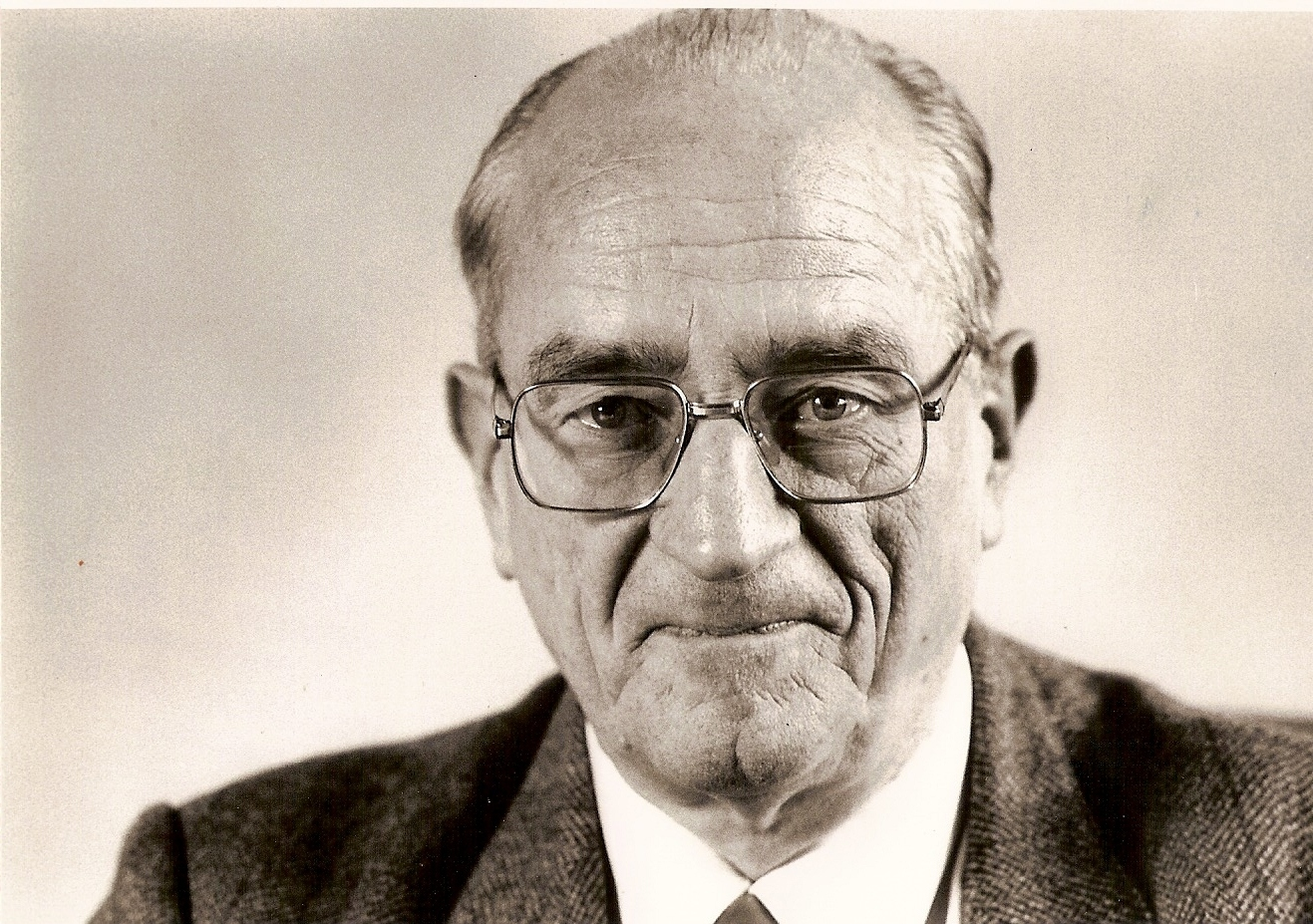
Jörgen Smit around 1983

Jörgen Smit (July 21, 1916 in Bergen – May 10, 1991 in Arlesheim) was a Norwegian teacher, teachers teacher, speaker and writer, mainly in the context of the Anthroposophical Society and the Waldorfschool Movement. He was the general secretary of the Norwegian Anthroposophical Society, co-founder of the Rudolf Steiner Seminar in Järna, Sweden and member of the Executive Council of the General Anthroposophical Society at the Goetheanum in Dornach, Switzerland.

== Life ==
Jörgen Smit grew up as second of seven sons in Bergen later in Oslo. he studied Classical Philology in Oslo and Basel with Ancient greek as main subject. He worked from 1941 to 1965 as a teacher at the Bergen Rudolf Steiner (Waldorf) School. Next to being a teacher he started at early age as a lecturer and spoke to a wide range of subjects most of the time however in the context of Anthroposophy and Waldorf education. From 1966 to 1975 he built up the teachers' seminary for Waldorf teachers in Järna, an adult training center which was co-founded by Jörgen Smit already 1961. In cooperation with the painter Arne Klingborg, the architect Erik Asmussen and the entrepreneur Åke Kumlander, amongst many others, a bigger center with a campus at the Baltic seashore devoted to anthroposophical inspired activities emerged.

1975 he was appointed on the Executive counsel of the General Anthroposophical Society in Dornach, Switzerland. Next to his duties as an executive member of the counsel he also headed the youth section and later the pedagogical section of the Goetheanum. More than half of the 4889 lectures he gave during his lifetime were held during the 16 years in Dornach. He travelled as a lecturer on all continents lecturing in Norwegian German and English, Europe remained his main working area. Most of the printed works by Jörgen Smit derive from the lectures he gave.

== Writings (in English) ==
- Meditation, Transforming our lives for the Encounter with Christ, Rudolf Steiner Press, London, 2007, ISBN 978-1-85584-149-9
- How to transform thinking, feeling and willing: practical exercises for the training of thinking, feeling, willing. Hawthhorn Press, Stroud, 1998, ISBN 1-869890-17-5;
- Spiritual Development: Meditation in Daily Life. Floris Books, 1996, ISBN 978-0-86315-096-8
- Lighting fires, Deepening Education through Meditation. Hawthhorn Press, Stroud, 1992, ISBN 1-869890-45-0
- Personal & Social Transformation: How to Develop Freedom, Equality, and Fraternity in Everyday Life. Howthorn Press, Stroud, 1992, ISBN 978-1-869890-39-1
- The Child, the teachers and the community. Pedagogical Section Council of North America, 1992
- For Waldorf teachers: the steps toward knowledge which the seeker for the spirit must take. Association of Waldorf Schools of North America, 1991, ISBN 978-0-9623978-3-7
- 'Tasks, Seeds and Qualities – concerning the School of Spiritual Science', annotated talks in 'The Deed of Rudolf Steiner', Christopher Houghton Budd. https://aebookstore.com/publications/chb-collected-works/full-chb-list/the-deed-of-rudolf-steiner/

== Literature ==
- Antroposofien i Norden. Fem land i samarbeide. Antropos, Oslo, 2008, ISBN 978-82-7940-071-4 (In Norwegian)
- What is happening in the Anthroposophical Society Vol. 12, No. 5, Sept./Oct. 1991 (Biography)
